= 2016 Malaysia Super Series Premier =

Tournament details
- Dates: 5–10 April 2016
- Level: Super Series Premier
- Total prize money: US$550,000
- Venue: Stadium Malawati
- Location: Shah Alam, Malaysia

Champions
- Men's singles: (Malaysia) Lee Chong Wei
- Women's singles: (Thailand) Ratchanok Intanon
- Men's doubles: (South Korea) Kim Gi-jung (South Korea) Kim Sa-rang
- Women's doubles: (China) Tang Yuanting (China) Yu Yang
- Mixed doubles: (Indonesia) Tontowi Ahmad (Indonesia) Liliyana Natsir

The 2016 Malaysia Super Series Premier was the third super series tournament of the 2016 BWF Super Series. The tournament took place in Shah Alam, Malaysia from April 5–April 10, 2016 and had a total purse of $550,000.

== Men's singles ==
=== Seeds ===
1. (China) Chen Long (final)
2. (Malaysia) Lee Chong Wei (champion)
3. (Japan) Kento Momota (second round)
4. (China) Lin Dan (quarter-finals)
5. (Denmark) Jan Ø. Jørgensen (semi-finals)
6. (Denmark) Viktor Axelsen (quarter-finals)
7. (Chinese Taipei) Chou Tien-chen (first round)
8. (China) Tian Houwei (quarter-finals)

=== Top half ===
First Round
1	(China) Chen L	21	21
(Germany) M Zwiebler	19	15
(Indonesia) T Sugiarto	21	16	11
(Hong Kong) Wong W K	8	21	21
8	(China) Tian HW	21	11	21
(Denmark) H-K Vittinghus	10	21	10
(Chinese Taipei) Hsu J-h	21	18	21
(Hong Kong) Ng K L	10	21	15
3	(Japan) K Momota	21	22
(India) H.S. Prannoy	19	20
(China) Wang ZM	19	18
(England) R Ouseph	21	21
7	(Chinese Taipei) Chou T-c	13	21	8
Q3	(Indonesia) J Christie	21	12	21
(India) A Jayaram	17	14
(Hong Kong) Hu Y	21	21

Second Round
1	(China) Chen L	21	21
(Hong Kong) Wong W K	17	12
8	(China) Tian HW	23	21
(Chinese Taipei) Hsu J-h	21	18
3	(Japan) K Momota
(England) R Ouseph	w	/	o
Q3	(Indonesia) J Christie	21	21
(Hong Kong) Hu Y	13	11

Quarterfinals
1	(China) Chen L	21	21
8	(China) Tian HW	16	16
(England) R Ouseph	19	19
Q3	(Indonesia) J Christie	21	21

Semifinals
1	(China) Chen L	8	21	21
Q3	(Indonesia) J Christie	21	19	14

=== Bottom half ===
First Round
PFQ	(Indonesia) A Ginting	16	19
Q2	(Malaysia) I Z Zainuddin	21	21
(Indonesia) I M Mustofa	12	17
5	(Denmark) J Ø Jørgensen	21	21
(Thailand) B Ponsana	23	9	21
(India) S Kidambi	21	21	10
Q4	(Malaysia) Chong Y H	10	15
4	(China) Lin D	21	21
PFQ	(Thailand) T Saensomboonsuk	21	23
(South Korea) Lee D-k	15	21
(Japan) S Sasaki	9	21	12
6	(Denmark) V Axelsen	21	15	21
Q1	(Malaysia) Goh S H	16	21	13
(South Korea) Son W-h	21	5	21
PFQ	(Japan) T Ueda	11	8
2	(Malaysia) Lee C W	21	21

Second Round
Q2	(Malaysia) I Z Zainuddin	7	16
5	(Denmark) J Ø Jørgensen	21	21
(Thailand) B Ponsana	15	9
4	(China) Lin D	21	21
PFQ	(Thailand) T Saensomboonsuk	15	11
6	(Denmark) V Axelsen	21	21
(South Korea) Son W-h	18	12
2	(Malaysia) Lee C W	21	21

Quarterfinals
5	(Denmark) J Ø Jørgensen	21	21
4	(China) Lin D	17	4
6	(Denmark) V Axelsen	14	13
2	(Malaysia) Lee C W	21	21

Semifinals
5	(Denmark) J Ø Jørgensen	7	14
2	(Malaysia) Lee C W	21	21

=== Finals ===
Semifinals
1	(China) Chen Long	8	21	21
Q3	(Indonesia) Jonatan Christie	21	19	14
5	(Denmark) Jan Ø. Jørgensen	7	14
2	(Malaysia) Lee Chong Wei	21	21

Final
1	(China) Chen Long	13	8
2	(Malaysia) Lee Chong Wei	21	21

== Women's singles ==
=== Seeds ===
1. (Spain) Carolina Marín (quarter-finals)
2. (China) Li Xuerui (second round)
3. (India) Saina Nehwal (semi-finals)
4. (Thailand) Ratchanok Intanon (champion)
5. (China) Wang Shixian (quarter-finals)
6. (China) Wang Yihan (semi-finals)
7. (South Korea) Sung Ji-hyun (second round)
8. (Japan) Nozomi Okuhara (second round)

=== Top half ===
First Round
1	(Spain) C Marín	21	21
(Hong Kong) Yip P Y	13	15
Q3	(Indonesia) J F Sugiarto	8	13
(Malaysia) Tee J Y	21	21
6	(China) Wang YH	21	21
(United States) Zhang BW	8	14
(Indonesia) M F Kusumastuti	18	21	9
(Hong Kong) Cheung N Y	21	19	21
4	(Thailand) R Intanon	21	21
(United States) I Wang	12	16
Q2	(Bulgaria) P Nedelcheva	21	15
(Chinese Taipei) Hsu Y-c	23	21
7	(South Korea) Sung J-h	23	21
(Japan) S Sato	21	16
(India) P.V. Sindhu	21	21
(China) He BJ	16	17

Second Round
1	(Spain) C Marín	21	22
(Malaysia) Tee J Y	13	20
6	(China) Wang YH	21	21
(Hong Kong) Cheung N Y	14	13
4	(Thailand) R Intanon	21	21
(Chinese Taipei) Hsu Y-c	15	12
7	(South Korea) Sung J-h	20	17
(India) P.V. Sindhu	22	21

Quarterfinals
1	(Spain) C Marín	13	15
6	(China) Wang YH	21	21
4	(Thailand) R Intanon	21	21
(India) P.V. Sindhu	7	8

Semifinals
6	(China) Wang YH	11	19
4	(Thailand) R Intanon	21	21

=== Bottom half ===
First Round
(Thailand) P Buranaprasertsuk	21	21
(Indonesia) L Fanetri	16	10
(Thailand) B Ongbumrungpan	21	17	17
8	(Japan) N Okuhara	18	21	21
Q4	(Bulgaria) L Zetchiri	13	12
(South Korea) Bae Y-j	21	21
(Thailand) N Jindapol	16	7
3	(India) S Nehwal	21	21
(Chinese Taipei) Pai Y-p	12	21	21
(Scotland) K Gilmour	21	15	18
(Japan) M Mitani	14	18
5	(China) Wang SX	21	21
Q1	(United States) R Schafer	7	15
(Chinese Taipei) Tai T-y	21	21
(Japan) A Yamaguchi	11	11
2	(China) Li XR	21	21

Second Round
(Thailand) P Buranaprasertsuk	21	22
8	(Japan) N Okuhara	12	20
(South Korea) Bae Y-j	10	16
3	(India) S Nehwal	21	21
(Chinese Taipei) Pai Y-p	12	15
5	(China) Wang SX	21	21
(Chinese Taipei) Tai T-y	14	21	21
2	(China) Li XR	21	18	16

Quarterfinals
(Thailand) P Buranaprasertsuk	21	14	14
3	(India) S Nehwal	19	21	21
5	(China) Wang SX	14	14
(Chinese Taipei) Tai T-y	21	21

Semifinals
3	(India) S Nehwal	19	13
(Chinese Taipei) Tai T-y	21	21

=== Finals ===
Semifinals
6	(China) Wang Yihan	11	19
4	(Thailand) Ratchanok Intanon	21	21
3	(India) Saina Nehwal	19	13
(Chinese Taipei) Tai Tzu-ying	21	21

Final
4	(Thailand) Ratchanok Intanon	21	21
(Chinese Taipei) Tai Tzu-ying	14	15

== Men's doubles ==
=== Seeds ===
1. (South Korea) Lee Yong-dae / Yoo Yeon-seong (semi-finals)
2. (Indonesia) Mohammad Ahsan / Hendra Setiawan (quarter-finals)
3. (China) Fu Haifeng / Zhang Nan (quarter-finals)
4. (China) Chai Biao / Hong Wei (final)
5. (South Korea) Kim Gi-jung / Kim Sa-rang (champions)
6. (Japan) Hiroyuki Endo / Kenichi Hayakawa (quarter-finals)
7. (South Korea) Ko Sung-hyun / Shin Baek-cheol (quarter-finals)
8. (Denmark) Mads Conrad-Petersen / Mads Pieler Kolding (semi-finals)

=== Top half ===
First Round
1	(South Korea) Lee Y-d (South Korea) Yoo Y-s	21	21
(Chinese Taipei) Lee S-m (Chinese Taipei) Tsai C-h	8	19
(Malaysia) Goh V S (Malaysia) Tan W K	21	21
(Chinese Taipei) Chen H-l (Chinese Taipei) Wang C-l	10	16
6	(Japan) H Endo (Japan) K Hayakawa	21	21
Q3	(Philippines) R Estanislao (Philippines) P J Vivas	7	8
Q2	(Malaysia) Hoon T H (Malaysia) Teo K S	21	19	21
(Thailand) D Puavaranukroh (Thailand) K Kedren	16	21	15
3	(China) Fu HF (China) Zhang N	21	21
PFQ	(Indonesia) H A Gunawan (Indonesia) M Kido	17	17
(China) Wang YL (China) Zhang W	21	21
(Denmark) K Astrup (Denmark) A S Rasmussen	19	19
5	(South Korea) Kim G-j (South Korea) Kim S-r	21	21
Q1	(Malaysia) D I Devadass (Malaysia) Tan J H	10	9
Q4	(Malaysia) M R Abdul Latif (Malaysia) M H Hashim	13	10
(Indonesia) B Angriawan (Indonesia) R A Saputro	21	21

Second Round
1	(South Korea) Lee Y-d (South Korea) Yoo Y-s	21	21
(Malaysia) Goh V S (Malaysia) Tan W K	13	11
6	(Japan) H Endo (Japan) K Hayakawa	18	24	21
Q2	(Malaysia) Hoon T H (Malaysia) Teo K S	21	22	15
3	(China) Fu HF (China) Zhang N	21	21
(China) Wang YL (China) Zhang W	17	9
5	(South Korea) Kim G-j (South Korea) Kim S-r	27	21
(Indonesia) B Angriawan (Indonesia) R A Saputro	25	15

Quarterfinals
1	(South Korea) Lee Y-d (South Korea) Yoo Y-s	18	21	22
6	(Japan) H Endo (Japan) K Hayakawa	21	14	20
3	(China) Fu HF (China) Zhang N	21	19	17
5	(South Korea) Kim G-j (South Korea) Kim S-r	15	21	21

Semifinals
1	(South Korea) Lee Y-d (South Korea) Yoo Y-s	16	12
5	(South Korea) Kim G-j (South Korea) Kim S-r	21	21

=== Bottom half ===
First Round
(Malaysia) Koo K K (Malaysia) Tan B H	21	24	21
(Japan) T Kamura (Japan) K Sonoda	19	26	17
PFQ	(Chinese Taipei) Liao M-c (Chinese Taipei) Tseng M-h	13	13
7	(South Korea) Ko S-h (South Korea) Shin B-c	21	21
(Indonesia) A Pratama (Indonesia) R K Suwardi	21	21
(Germany) M Fuchs (Germany) J Schöttler	18	10
(Thailand) B Issara (Thailand) N Puangpuapech
4	(China) Chai B (China) Hong W	w	/	o
(India) M Attri (India) B. S Reddy	11	10
(Russia) V Ivanov (Russia) I Sozonov	21	21
(United States) P Chew (United States) S Pongnairat	14	11
8	(Denmark) M Conrad-Petersen (Denmark) M Pieler Kolding	21	21
(Indonesia) M F Gideon (Indonesia) K S Sukamuljo	21	20	21
(England) M Ellis (England) C Langridge	16	22	19
(China) Li JH (China) Liu YC	17	17
2	(Indonesia) M Ahsan (Indonesia) H Setiawan	21	21

Second Round
(Malaysia) Koo K K (Malaysia) Tan B H	22	11	20
7	(South Korea) Ko S-h (South Korea) Shin B-c	20	21	22
(Indonesia) A Pratama (Indonesia) R K Suwardi	21	29	18
4	(China) Chai B (China) Hong W	18	30	21
(Russia) V Ivanov (Russia) I Sozonov	12	8
8	(Denmark) M Conrad-Petersen (Denmark) M Pieler Kolding	21	21
(Indonesia) M F Gideon (Indonesia) K S Sukamuljo	14	19
2	(Indonesia) M Ahsan (Indonesia) H Setiawan	21	21

Quarterfinals
7	(South Korea) Ko S-h (South Korea) Shin B-c	16	19
4	(China) Chai B (China) Hong W	21	21
8	(Denmark) M Conrad-Petersen (Denmark) M Pieler Kolding	21	17	21
2	(Indonesia) M Ahsan (Indonesia) H Setiawan	8	21	17

Semifinals
4	(China) Chai B (China) Hong W	26	21
8	(Denmark) M Conrad-Petersen (Denmark) M Pieler Kolding	24	19

=== Finals ===
Semifinals
1	(South Korea) Lee Yong-dae (South Korea) Yoo Yeon-seong	16	12
5	(South Korea) Kim Gi-jung (South Korea) Kim Sa-rang	21	21
4	(China) Chai Biao (China) Hong Wei	26	21
8	(Denmark) Mads Conrad-Petersen (Denmark) Mads Pieler Kolding	24	19

Final
5	(South Korea) Kim Gi-jung (South Korea) Kim Sa-rang	21	21
4	(China) Chai Biao (China) Hong Wei	19	15

== Women's doubles ==
=== Seeds ===
1. (China) Luo Ying / Luo Yu (first round)
2. (Indonesia) Nitya Krishinda Maheswari / Greysia Polii (semi-finals)
3. (Japan) Misaki Matsutomo / Ayaka Takahashi (quarter-finals)
4. (Denmark) Christinna Pedersen / Kamilla Rytter Juhl (first round)
5. (China) Tang Yuanting / Yu Yang (champions)
6. (China) Tian Qing / Zhao Yunlei (quarter-finals)
7. (South Korea) Jung Kyung-eun / Shin Seung-chan (final)
8. (South Korea) Chang Ye-na / Lee So-hee (quarter-finals)

=== Top half ===
First Round
1	(China) Luo Y (China) Luo Y	13	14
(Japan) S Matsuo (Japan) M Naito	21	21
(Chinese Taipei) Hsieh P-c (Chinese Taipei) Wu T-j	21	21
PFQ	(Malaysia) Cheah Y S (Malaysia) Chin K M	15	8
6	(China) Tian Q (China) Zhao YL	21	21
PFQ	(Indonesia) A Rahayu (Indonesia) J F Sugiarto	13	16
(Indonesia) A S Awanda (Indonesia) N K Mahadewi Istirani	21	21
(Thailand) J Kititharakul (Thailand) R Prajongjai	12	14
3	(Japan) M Matsutomo (Japan) A Takahashi	21	21
(Chinese Taipei) Hsu Y-c (Chinese Taipei) Pai Y-p	8	11
(Malaysia) Vivian Hoo K M (Malaysia) Woon K W	21	21
(Germany) I Herttrich (Germany) B Michels	17	14
5	(China) Tang YT (China) Yu Y	21	21
Q4	(Malaysia) Goh Y C (Malaysia) Peck Y W	10	8
(Netherlands) E Muskens (Netherlands) S Piek	21	21
(United States) E Lee (United States) P L Obanana	14	12

Second Round
(Japan) S Matsuo (Japan) M Naito	21	21
(Chinese Taipei) Hsieh P-c (Chinese Taipei) Wu T-j	18	11
6	(China) Tian Q (China) Zhao YL	22	21	21
(Indonesia) A S Awanda (Indonesia) N K Mahadewi Istirani	24	13	17
3	(Japan) M Matsutomo (Japan) A Takahashi	21	25
(Malaysia) Vivian Hoo K M (Malaysia) Woon K W	19	23
5	(China) Tang YT (China) Yu Y	21	23
(Netherlands) E Muskens (Netherlands) S Piek	17	21

Quarterfinals
(Japan) S Matsuo (Japan) M Naito	21	18	21
6	(China) Tian Q (China) Zhao YL	19	21	10
3	(Japan) M Matsutomo (Japan) A Takahashi	21	17	18
5	(China) Tang YT (China) Yu Y	14	21	21

Semifinals
(Japan) S Matsuo (Japan) M Naito	15	18
5	(China) Tang YT (China) Yu Y	21	21

=== Bottom half ===
First Round
(Egypt) N Ashraf (Egypt) M Eltanany	6	8
(South Korea) Go A-r (South Korea) Yoo H-w	21	21
(Bulgaria) G Stoeva (Bulgaria) S Stoeva	8	22
7	(South Korea) Jung K-e (South Korea) Shin S-c	21	24
(China) Huang YQ (China) Tang JH	21	21
PFQ	(Malaysia) Payee Lim P Y (Malaysia) Lim P Z	9	9
(China) Chen QC (China) Jia YF	21	22
4	(Denmark) C Pedersen (Denmark) K Rytter Juhl	16	20
(England) H Olver (England) L Smith	21	21
Q3	(Indonesia) N Herloardjo (Indonesia) R S Putri	12	9
(Thailand) P Supajirakul (Thailand) S Taerattanachai	15	24	16
8	(South Korea) Chang Y-n (South Korea) Lee S-h	21	22	21
Q1	BYE
Q2	BYE
(Japan) N Fukuman (Japan) K Yonao	18	6
2	(Indonesia) N K Maheswari (Indonesia) G Polii	21	21

Second Round
(South Korea) Go A-r (South Korea) Yoo H-w	14	17
7	(South Korea) Jung K-e (South Korea) Shin S-c	21	21
(China) Huang YQ (China) Tang JH	22	11
(China) Chen QC (China) Jia YF	24	21
(England) H Olver (England) L Smith	16	18
8	(South Korea) Chang Y-n (South Korea) Lee S-h	21	21
BYE
2	(Indonesia) N K Maheswari (Indonesia) G Polii

Quarterfinals
7	(South Korea) Jung K-e (South Korea) Shin S-c	21	21
(China) Chen QC (China) Jia YF	17	17
8	(South Korea) Chang Y-n (South Korea) Lee S-h	16	21	18
2	(Indonesia) N K Maheswari (Indonesia) G Polii	21	18	21

Semifinals
7	(South Korea) Jung K-e (South Korea) Shin S-c	21	21
2	(Indonesia) N K Maheswari (Indonesia) G Polii	16	14

=== Finals ===
Semifinals
(Japan) Shizuka Matsuo (Japan) Mami Naito	15	18
5	(China) Tang Yuanting (China) Yu Yang	21	21
7	(South Korea) Jung Kyung-eun (South Korea) Shin Seung-chan	21	21
2	(Indonesia) Nitya Krishinda Maheswari (Indonesia) Greysia Polii	16	14

Final
5	(China) Tang Yuanting (China) Yu Yang	21	21
7	(South Korea) Jung Kyung-eun (South Korea) Shin Seung-chan	11	17

== Mixed doubles ==
=== Seeds ===
1. (China) Zhang Nan / Zhao Yunlei (semi-finals)
2. (Indonesia) Tontowi Ahmad / Liliyana Natsir (champions)
3. (China) Liu Cheng / Bao Yixin (second round)
4. (South Korea) Ko Sung-hyun / Kim Ha-na (quarter-finals)
5. (China) Xu Chen / Ma Jin (second round)
6. (Denmark) Joachim Fischer Nielsen / Christinna Pedersen (semi-finals)
7. (England) Chris Adcock / Gabrielle Adcock (quarter-finals)
8. (Indonesia) Praveen Jordan / Debby Susanto (second round)

=== Top half ===
First Round
1	(China) Zhang N (China) Zhao YL	21	21
(Netherlands) J Arends (Netherlands) S Piek	17	19
(Russia) V Durkin (Russia) N Vislova	24	19
(South Korea) Shin B-c (South Korea) Chae Y-j	26	21
8	(Indonesia) P Jordan (Indonesia) D Susanto	21	21
(Japan) K Kazuno (Japan) A Kurihara	14	15
(South Korea) Kim G-j (South Korea) Shin S-c	17	18
(Singapore) D B Chrisnanta (Singapore) Vanessa Neo Y Y	21	21
3	(China) Liu C (China) Bao YX	21	23
(South Korea) Choi S-g (South Korea) Eom H-w	15	21
(Indonesia) M Kido (Indonesia) P Z Bernadeth	16	17
(Thailand) D Puavaranukroh (Thailand) S Taerattanachai	21	21
5	(China) Xu C (China) Ma J	21	21
(Hong Kong) Chan Y L (Hong Kong) Tse Y S	10	12
(Indonesia) R Widianto (Indonesia) R P Dili	15	18
(Malaysia) Chan P S (Malaysia) Goh L Y	21	21

Second Round
1	(China) Zhang N (China) Zhao YL	21	21
(South Korea) Shin B-c (South Korea) Chae Y-j	14	15
8	(Indonesia) P Jordan (Indonesia) D Susanto	19	14
(Singapore) D B Chrisnanta (Singapore) Vanessa Neo Y Y	21	21
3	(China) Liu C (China) Bao YX	20	21	17
(Thailand) D Puavaranukroh (Thailand) S Taerattanachai	22	18	21
5	(China) Xu C (China) Ma J	21	6
(Malaysia) Chan P S (Malaysia) Goh L Y	23	21

Quarterfinals
1	(China) Zhang N (China) Zhao YL	21	21
(Singapore) D B Chrisnanta (Singapore) Vanessa Neo Y Y	15	12
(Thailand) D Puavaranukroh (Thailand) S Taerattanachai	18	22	17
(Malaysia) Chan P S (Malaysia) Goh L Y	21	20	21

Semifinals
1	(China) Zhang N (China) Zhao YL	26	15	13
(Malaysia) Chan P S (Malaysia) Goh L Y	24	21	21

=== Bottom half ===
First Round
(China) Lu K (China) Huang YQ	9	21	11
Q4	(South Korea) Yoo Y-s (South Korea) Chang Y-n	21	9	21
(Japan) K Sonoda (Japan) N Fukuman	22	11	15
6	(Denmark) J Fischer Nielsen (Denmark) C Pedersen	20	21	21
Q3	(Singapore) Terry Hee Y K (Singapore) Tan W T	9	21	15
Q1	(China) Liu YC (China) Tang JH	21	12	21
PFQ	(Chinese Taipei) Liao M-c (Chinese Taipei) Chen H-h	16	16
4	(South Korea) Ko S-h (South Korea) Kim H-n	21	21
(Indonesia) R Alexander (Indonesia) M D Oktaviani	21	16	21
(Hong Kong) Lee C H (Hong Kong) Chau H W	19	21	16
Q2	(Indonesia) A Firmansyah (Indonesia) N Herloardjo	11	16
7	(England) C Adcock (England) G Adcock	21	21
(United States) P Chew (United States) J Subandhi	12	10
(Germany) M Fuchs (Germany) B Michels	21	21
PFQ	(China) Wang YL (China) Chen QC	18	14
2	(Indonesia) T Ahmad (Indonesia) L Natsir	21	21

Second Round
Q4	(South Korea) Yoo Y-s (South Korea) Chang Y-n	17	20
6	(Denmark) J Fischer Nielsen (Denmark) C Pedersen	21	22
Q1	(China) Liu YC (China) Tang JH	19	16
4	(South Korea) Ko S-h (South Korea) Kim H-n	21	21
(Indonesia) R Alexander (Indonesia) M D Oktaviani	24	7
7	(England) C Adcock (England) G Adcock	26	21
(Germany) M Fuchs (Germany) B Michels	10	15
2	(Indonesia) T Ahmad (Indonesia) L Natsir	21	21

Quarterfinals
6	(Denmark) J Fischer Nielsen (Denmark) C Pedersen	14	21	21
4	(South Korea) Ko S-h (South Korea) Kim H-n	21	18	7
7	(England) C Adcock (England) G Adcock	17	14
2	(Indonesia) T Ahmad (Indonesia) L Natsir	21	21

Semifinals
6	(Denmark) J Fischer Nielsen (Denmark) C Pedersen	18	17
2	(Indonesia) T Ahmad (Indonesia) L Natsir	21	21

=== Finals ===
Semifinals
1	(China) Zhang Nan (China) Zhao Yunlei	26	15	13
(Malaysia) Chan Peng Soon (Malaysia) Goh Liu Ying	24	21	21
6	(Denmark) Joachim Fischer Nielsen (Denmark) Christinna Pedersen	18	17
2	(Indonesia) Tontowi Ahmad (Indonesia) Liliyana Natsir	21	21

Final
(Malaysia) Chan Peng Soon (Malaysia) Goh Liu Ying	21	21	16
2	(Indonesia) Tontowi Ahmad (Indonesia) Liliyana Natsir	23	13	21

Preceded by 2015 Malaysia Super Series Premier	Malaysia Open	Succeeded by 2017 Malaysia Super Series Premier
Preceded by 2016 India Super Series	BWF Super Series; 2016 BWF Season	Succeeded by 2016 Singapore Super Series
