= 2015 BWF World Championships – Women's doubles =

Women's doubles at the 2015 BWF World Championships
- Venue: Istora Senayan
- Location: Jakarta, Indonesia
- Dates: August 10, 2015 – August 16, 2015

Medalists
gold medal	Tian Qing; Zhao Yunlei	China
silver medal	Christinna Pedersen; Kamilla Rytter Juhl	Denmark
bronze medal	Nitya Krishinda Maheswari; Greysia Polii	Indonesia
bronze medal	Naoko Fukuman; Kurumi Yonao	Japan

The women's doubles tournament of the 2015 BWF World Championships (World Badminton Championships) took place from August 10 to 16. Tian Qing and Zhao Yunlei enter the competition as the current champions.

== Seeds ==
1. (Japan) Misaki Matsutomo / Ayaka Takahashi (third round)
2. (China) Luo Ying / Luo Yu (third round)
3. (China) Wang Xiaoli / Yu Yang (quarterfinals)
4. (Denmark) Christinna Pedersen / Kamilla Rytter Juhl (final)
5. (China) Tian Qing / Zhao Yunlei (champion)
6. (China) Ma Jin / Tang Yuanting (third round)
7. (Indonesia) Nitya Krishinda Maheswari / Greysia Polii (semifinals)
8. (Japan) Reika Kakiiwa / Miyuki Maeda (third round)

9. (Netherlands) Eefje Muskens / Selena Piek (third round)
10. (South Korea) Chang Ye-na / Jung Kyung-eun (third round)
11. (South Korea) Lee So-hee / Shin Seung-chan (third round)
12. (Malaysia) Vivian Hoo Kah Mun / Woon Khe Wei (second round)
13. (India) Jwala Gutta / Ashwini Ponnappa (quarterfinals)
14. (Japan) Shizuka Matsuo / Mami Naito (third round)
15. (Thailand) Puttita Supajirakul / Sapsiree Taerattanachai (second round)
16. (Bulgaria) Gabriela Stoeva / Stefani Stoeva (second round)

Click on the seed number of a player to go to their draw section.

== Draw ==
=== Finals ===
Quarterfinals
(Malaysia) Amelia Alicia Anscelly (Malaysia) Soong Fie Cho	11	11
7	(Indonesia) Nitya Krishinda Maheswari (Indonesia) Greysia Polii	21	21
3	(China) Wang Xiaoli (China) Yu Yang	17	13
5	(China) Tian Qing (China) Zhao Yunlei	21	21
(South Korea) Go Ah-ra (South Korea) Yoo Hae-won	8	10
4	(Denmark) Christinna Pedersen (Denmark) Kamilla Rytter Juhl	21	21
13	(India) Jwala Gutta (India) Ashwini Ponnappa	23	14
(Japan) Naoko Fukuman (Japan) Kurumi Yonao	25	21

Semifinals
7	(Indonesia) Nitya Krishinda Maheswari (Indonesia) Greysia Polii	8	16
5	(China) Tian Qing (China) Zhao Yunlei	21	21
4	(Denmark) Christinna Pedersen (Denmark) Kamilla Rytter Juhl	21	21
(Japan) Naoko Fukuman (Japan) Kurumi Yonao	12	15

Final
5	(China) Tian Qing (China) Zhao Yunlei	23	21	21
4	(Denmark) Christinna Pedersen (Denmark) Kamilla Rytter Juhl	25	8	15

=== Section 1 ===
First Round
(Russia) Victoria Dergunova (Russia) Olga Morozova	18	12
(Malaysia) Joyce Choong Wai Chi (Malaysia) Yap Cheng Wen	21	21
(Malaysia) Amelia Alicia Anscelly (Malaysia) Soong Fie Cho	21	21
(Czech Republic) Sarka Krizkova (Czech Republic) Katerina Tomalova	8	9
(Malaysia) Lim Yin Loo (Malaysia) Lee Meng Yean	19	22	21
(Singapore) Vanessa Neo Yu Yan (Singapore) Shinta Mulia Sari	21	20	19
(India) Pradnya Gadre (India) N. Sikki Reddy	16	21	21
(Germany) Isabel Herttrich (Germany) Birgit Michels	21	15	14

Second Round
1	(Japan) Misaki Matsutomo (Japan) Ayaka Takahashi	21	21
(Malaysia) Joyce Choong Wai Chi (Malaysia) Yap Cheng Wen	10	9
16	(Bulgaria) Gabriela Stoeva (Bulgaria) Stefani Stoeva	17	14
(Malaysia) Amelia Alicia Anscelly (Malaysia) Soong Fie Cho	21	21
7	(Indonesia) Nitya Krishinda Maheswari (Indonesia) Greysia Polii	17	21	21
(Malaysia) Lim Yin Loo (Malaysia) Lee Meng Yean	21	13	11
14	(Japan) Shizuka Matsuo (Japan) Mami Naito	21	21
(India) Pradnya Gadre (India) N. Sikki Reddy	17	19

Third Round
1	(Japan) Misaki Matsutomo (Japan) Ayaka Takahashi	15	21	14
(Malaysia) Amelia Alicia Anscelly (Malaysia) Soong Fie Cho	21	12	21
7	(Indonesia) Nitya Krishinda Maheswari (Indonesia) Greysia Polii	21	16	21
14	(Japan) Shizuka Matsuo (Japan) Mami Naito	11	21	13

Quarterfinals
(Malaysia) Amelia Alicia Anscelly (Malaysia) Soong Fie Cho	11	11
7	(Indonesia) Nitya Krishinda Maheswari (Indonesia) Greysia Polii	21	21

=== Section 2 ===
First Round
(England) Heather Olver (England) Lauren Smith	21	21
(Egypt) Nadine Ashraf (Egypt) Menna Eltanany	5	1
(Finland) Mathilda Lindholm (Finland) Jenny Nyström	w	/	o
(Chinese Taipei) Hsu Ya-ching (Chinese Taipei) Pai Yu-po
(Thailand) Jongkonphan Kittiharakul (Thailand) Rawinda Prajongjai	21	21
(Peru) Katherine Winder (Peru) Luz María Zornoza	5	12
(Chinese Taipei) Chiang Kai-hsin (Chinese Taipei) Wu Fang-chien	21	21
(Argentina) Florencia Bernatene (Argentina) Daiana Garmendia	3	4

Second Round
3	(China) Wang Xiaoli (China) Yu Yang	21	21
(England) Heather Olver (England) Lauren Smith	9	12
10	(South Korea) Chang Ye-na (South Korea) Jung Kyung-eun	18	21	21
(Chinese Taipei) Hsu Ya-ching (Chinese Taipei) Pai Yu-po	21	12	6
5	(China) Tian Qing (China) Zhao Yunlei	21	21
(Thailand) Jongkonphan Kittiharakul (Thailand) Rawinda Prajongjai	12	7
9	(Netherlands) Eefje Muskens (Netherlands) Selena Piek	21	21
(Chinese Taipei) Chiang Kai-hsin (Chinese Taipei) Wu Fang-chien	10	10

Third Round
3	(China) Wang Xiaoli (China) Yu Yang	21	22
10	(South Korea) Chang Ye-na (South Korea) Jung Kyung-eun	17	20
5	(China) Tian Qing (China) Zhao Yunlei	21	21
9	(Netherlands) Eefje Muskens (Netherlands) Selena Piek	12	18

Quarterfinals
3	(China) Wang Xiaoli (China) Yu Yang	17	13
5	(China) Tian Qing (China) Zhao Yunlei	21	21

=== Section 3 ===
First Round
(South Korea) Go Ah-ra (South Korea) Yoo Hae-won	21	21
(England) Sophie Brown (England) Kate Robertshaw	11	15
(Germany) Johanna Goliszewski (Germany) Carla Nelte	23	14	18
(Indonesia) Keshya Nurvita Hanadia (Indonesia) Devi Tika Permatasari	21	21	21
(Indonesia) Pia Zebadiah Bernadeth (Indonesia) Rizki Amelia Pradipta	21	15	21
(Netherlands) Samantha Barning (Netherlands) Iris Tabeling	17	21	16
(Chinese Taipei) Chang Hsin-tien (Chinese Taipei) Chang Ching-hui	16	21	21
(Turkey) Ozge Bayrak (Turkey) Neslihan Yigit	21	16	13

Second Round
(South Korea) Go Ah-ra (South Korea) Yoo Hae-won	21	18	21
15	(Thailand) Puttita Supajirakul (Thailand) Sapsiree Taerattanachai	12	21	13
(Indonesia) Keshya Nurvita Hanadia (Indonesia) Devi Tika Permatasari	11	8
6	(China) Ma Jin (China) Tang Yuanting	21	21
(Indonesia) Pia Zebadiah Bernadeth (Indonesia) Rizki Amelia Pradipta	9	18
11	(South Korea) Lee So-hee (South Korea) Shin Seung-chan	21	21
(Chinese Taipei) Chang Hsin-tien (Chinese Taipei) Chang Ching-hui	15	15
4	(Denmark) Christinna Pedersen (Denmark) Kamilla Rytter Juhl	21	21

Third Round
(South Korea) Go Ah-ra (South Korea) Yoo Hae-won	16	21	21
6	(China) Ma Jin (China) Tang Yuanting	21	17	14
11	(South Korea) Lee So-hee (South Korea) Shin Seung-chan	11	17
4	(Denmark) Christinna Pedersen (Denmark) Kamilla Rytter Juhl	21	21

Quarterfinals
(South Korea) Go Ah-ra (South Korea) Yoo Hae-won	8	10
4	(Denmark) Christinna Pedersen (Denmark) Kamilla Rytter Juhl	21	21

=== Section 4 ===
First Round
(Canada) Alex Bruce (Canada) Phyllis Chan	14	8
(Chinese Taipei) Hsieh Pei-chen (Chinese Taipei) Wu Ti-jung	21	21
(India) Dhanya Nair (India) Mohita Sahdev	18	16
(France) Delphine Lansac (France) Emilie Lefel	21	21
(Japan) Naoko Fukuman (Japan) Kurumi Yonao
(Russia) Ekaterina Bolotova (Russia) Evgeniya Kosetskaya	w	/	o
(Indonesia) Shendy Puspa Irawati (Indonesia) Vita Marissa	20	21	21
(United States) Eva Lee (United States) Paula Lynn Obanana	22	17	16

Second Round
(Chinese Taipei) Hsieh Pei-chen (Chinese Taipei) Wu Ti-jung	10	18
13	(India) Jwala Gutta (India) Ashwini Ponnappa	21	21
(France) Delphine Lansac (France) Emilie Lefel	21	11	13
8	(Japan) Reika Kakiiwa (Japan) Miyuki Maeda	17	21	21
(Japan) Naoko Fukuman (Japan) Kurumi Yonao	21	21
12	(Malaysia) Vivian Hoo Kah Mun (Malaysia) Woon Khe Wei	13	11
(Indonesia) Shendy Puspa Irawati (Indonesia) Vita Marissa	10	9
2	(China) Luo Ying (China) Luo Yu	21	21

Third Round
13	(India) Jwala Gutta (India) Ashwini Ponnappa	21	18	21
8	(Japan) Reika Kakiiwa (Japan) Miyuki Maeda	15	21	19
(Japan) Naoko Fukuman (Japan) Kurumi Yonao	18	22	21
2	(China) Luo Ying (China) Luo Yu	21	20	19

Quarterfinals
13	(India) Jwala Gutta (India) Ashwini Ponnappa	23	14
(Japan) Naoko Fukuman (Japan) Kurumi Yonao	25	21
