= 2016 India Super Series =

Tournament details
- Dates: 29 March–3 April 2016
- Level: Super Series
- Total prize money: US$300,000
- Venue: Siri Fort Indoor Stadium
- Location: New Delhi, India

Champions
- Men's singles: (Japan) Kento Momota
- Women's singles: (Thailand) Ratchanok Intanon
- Men's doubles: (Indonesia) Markus Fernaldi Gideon (Indonesia) Kevin Sanjaya Sukamuljo
- Women's doubles: (Japan) Misaki Matsutomo (Japan) Ayaka Takahashi
- Mixed doubles: (China) Lu Kai (China) Huang Yaqiong

The 2016 India Super Series was the second super series tournament of the 2016 BWF Super Series. The tournament took place in Siri Fort Sports Complex, New Delhi, India from 29 March – 3 April 2016 and had a total purse of $300,000.

== Men's singles ==
=== Seeds ===
1. (Malaysia) Lee Chong Wei (second round)
2. (Japan) Kento Momota (champion)
3. (Denmark) Jan Ø. Jørgensen (second round)
4. (China) Lin Dan (second round)
5. (Denmark) Viktor Axelsen (final)
6. (Chinese Taipei) Chou Tien-chen (second round)
7. (China) Tian Houwei (second round)
8. (Indonesia) Tommy Sugiarto (quarterfinals)

=== Top half ===
First Round
1	(Malaysia) Lee C W	21	21
Q4	(Japan) K Sakai	11	17
(Thailand) B Ponsana	21	15	18
(Hong Kong) Wei N	16	21	21
5	(Denmark) V Axelsen	21	21	21
(Hong Kong) Hu Y	23	14	5
PFQ	(India) B S Praneeth	20	13
Q2	(Indonesia) S D Kuncoro	22	21
4	(China) Lin D	21	21
Q3	(India) S Varma	18	9
(South Korea) Son W-h	21	21
(China) Wang ZM	15	12
8	(Indonesia) T Sugiarto	21	18	21
(South Korea) Lee D-k	18	21	18
(Thailand) T Saensomboonsuk	23	18	21
(India) H. S. Prannoy	21	21	13

Second Round
1	(Malaysia) Lee C W	19	19
(Hong Kong) Wei N	21	21
5	(Denmark) V Axelsen	21	18	21
Q2	(Indonesia) S D Kuncoro	18	21	16
4	(China) Lin D	13	20
(South Korea) Son W-h	21	22
8	(Indonesia) T Sugiarto	24	21
(Thailand) T Saensomboonsuk	22	19

Quarterfinals
(Hong Kong) Wei N	17	12
5	(Denmark) V Axelsen	21	21
(South Korea) Son W-h	21	13	21
8	(Indonesia) T Sugiarto	11	21	8

Semifinals
5	(Denmark) V Axelsen	21	21
(South Korea) Son W-h	11	11

=== Bottom half ===
First Round
(India) A Jayaram	12	21	19
(Germany) M Zwiebler	21	13	21
(India) S Kidambi	13	21	22
7	(China) Tian HW	21	17	24
(China) Xue S	21	21
(Chinese Taipei) Hsu J-h	10	8
Q1	(Japan) K Nishimoto	15	21	16
3	(Denmark) J Ø. Jørgensen	21	15	21
(Denmark) H-K Vittinghus	21	21
(Japan) S Sasaki	17	16
(Hong Kong) Wong W K	21	18	19
6	(Chinese Taipei) Chou T-c	12	21	21
(Hong Kong) Ng K L	23	21
(Japan) T Ueda	21	17
(England) R Ouseph	21	16	15
2	(Japan) K Momota	15	21	21

Second Round
(Germany) M Zwiebler	18	21	23
7	(China) Tian HW	21	19	21
(China) Xue S	21	15	21
3	(Denmark) J Ø. Jørgensen	18	21	14
(Denmark) H-K Vittinghus	21	21
6	(Chinese Taipei) Chou T-c	12	12
(Hong Kong) Ng K L	16	11
2	(Japan) K Momota	21	21

Quarterfinals
(Germany) M Zwiebler	21	13	14
(China) Xue S	16	21	21
(Denmark) H-K Vittinghus	8	9
2	(Japan) K Momota	21	21

Semifinals
(China) Xue S	21	6^{r}
2	(Japan) K Momota	17	3

=== Finals ===
Semifinals
5	(Denmark) Viktor Axelsen	21	21
(South Korea) Son Wan-ho	11	11
(China) Xue Song	21	6^{r}
2	(Japan) Kento Momota	17	3

Final
5	(Denmark) Viktor Axelsen	15	18
2	(Japan) Kento Momota	21	21

== Women's singles ==
=== Seeds ===
1. (Spain) Carolina Marín (withdrew)
2. (India) Saina Nehwal (semifinals)
3. (China) Li Xuerui (final)
4. (Thailand) Ratchanok Intanon (champion)
5. (South Korea) Sung Ji-Hyun (quarterfinals)
6. (China) Wang Shixian (quarterfinals)
7. (Japan) Nozomi Okuhara (withdrew)
8. (Chinese Taipei) Tai Tzu-Ying (quarterfinals)

=== Top half ===
First Round
PFQ	(Italy) J Cicognini	8	8
(India) P. V. Sindhu	21	21
(Japan) M Mitani	10	12
(Thailand) B Ongbumrungpan	21	21
PFQ	(Mauritius) K Foo Kune	6	8
(South Korea) Bae Y-j	21	21
(Indonesia) L Fanetri	21	11	20
(Japan) Y Hashimoto	18	21	22
4	(Thailand) R Intanon	21	21
(Scotland) K Gilmour	13	10
Q1	(India) A Prabhudesai	18	15
Q4	(India) R Das	21	21
8	(Chinese Taipei) Tai T-y	22	21
(Hong Kong) Yip P Y	20	15
(Japan) A Yamaguchi	12	21	21
(United States) I Wang	21	5	19

Second Round
(India) P. V. Sindhu	17	21	21
(Thailand) B Ongbumrungpan	21	19	16
(South Korea) Bae Y-j	21	21
(Japan) Y Hashimoto	16	10
4	(Thailand) R Intanon	21	21
Q4	(India) R Das	9	4
8	(Chinese Taipei) Tai T-y	21	21
(Japan) A Yamaguchi	16	19

Quarterfinals
(India) P. V. Sindhu	21	15	15
(South Korea) Bae Y-j	15	21	21
4	(Thailand) R Intanon	12	21	22
8	(Chinese Taipei) Tai T-y	21	14	20

Semifinals
(South Korea) Bae Y-j	8	11
4	(Thailand) R Intanon	21	21

=== Bottom half ===
First Round
(Japan) S Sato	21	21
(Hong Kong) Cheung N Y	11	16
Q2	(India) R S Gadde	10	14
6	(China) Wang SX	21	21
(Thailand) P Buranapresertsuk	21	21
(Indonesia) M F Kusumastuti	18	7
(Japan) A Ohori	8	8
3	(China) Li XR	21	21
(Chinese Taipei) Pai Y-p	21	21
(United States) R Schafer	12	11
(Chinese Taipei) Hsu Y-c	8	16
5	(South Korea) Sung J-h	21	21
(Russia) N Perminova	13	15
(Thailand) N Jindapol	21	21
Q3	(India) T Lad	7	13
2	(India) S Nehwal	21	21

Second Round
(Japan) S Sato	21	11	14
6	(China) Wang SX	19	21	21
(Thailand) P Buranapresertsuk	21	13	21
3	(China) Li XR	17	21	23
(Chinese Taipei) Pai Y-p	16	11
5	(South Korea) Sung J-h	21	21
(Thailand) N Jindapol	19	14
2	(India) S Nehwal	21	21

Quarterfinals
6	(China) Wang SX	20	21	17
3	(China) Li XR	22	12	21
5	(South Korea) Sung J-h	21	14	19
2	(India) S Nehwal	19	21	21

Semifinals
3	(China) Li XR	22	17	21
2	(India) S Nehwal	20	21	19

=== Finals ===
Semifinals
(South Korea) Bae Yeon-ju	8	11
4	(Thailand) Ratchanok Intanon	21	21
3	(China) Li Xuerui	22	17	21
2	(India) Saina Nehwal	20	21	19

Final
4	(Thailand) Ratchanok Intanon	21	21
3	(China) Li Xuerui	17	18

== Men's doubles ==
=== Seeds ===
1. (China) Chai Biao / Hong Wei (second round)
2. (South Korea) Kim Gi-jung / Kim Sa-rang (quarterfinals)
3. (Japan) Hiroyuki Endo / Kenichi Hayakawa (withdrew)
4. (Denmark) Mads Conrad-Petersen / Mads Pieler Kolding (quarterfinals)
5. (South Korea) Ko Sung-hyun / Shin Baek-cheol (semifinals)
6. (China) Liu Xiaolong / Qiu Zihan (withdrew)
7. (Indonesia) Angga Pratama / Ricky Karanda Suwardi (final)
8. (China) Li Junhui / Liu Yuchen (first round)

=== Top half ===
First Round
1	(China) Chai B (China) Hong W	21	18	21
(Denmark) K Astrup (Denmark) A S Rasmussen	19	21	18
(Germany) M Fuchs (Germany) J Schöttler	7	21	19
(Indonesia) M F Gideon (Indonesia) K S Sukamuljo	21	16	21
PFQ	(India) V Manuel (India) S. Sanjeeth	13	13
(India) M Attri (India) B S Reddy	21	21
(Chinese Taipei) Chen H-l (Chinese Taipei) Wang C-l	21	21
(United States) P Chew (United States) S Pongnairat	11	11
4	(Denmark) M Conrad-Petersen (Denmark) M Pieler Kolding	21	21
Q3	(India) R K Chander (India) L Kumar	9	12
PFQ	(India) U Arora (India) S V Kumar	7	16
(Thailand) B Issara (Thailand) N Puangpuapech	21	21
8	(China) Li JH (China) Liu YC	19	18
(Malaysia) Goh V S (Malaysia) Tan W K	21	21
Q4	(India) D C Kumar (India) B Yadav	5	5
(China) Wang YL (China) Zhang W	21	21

Second Round
1	(China) Chai B (China) Hong W	20	21	18
(Indonesia) M F Gideon (Indonesia) K S Sukamuljo	22	19	21
(India) M Attri (India) B S Reddy	19	12
(Chinese Taipei) Chen H-l (Chinese Taipei) Wang C-l	21	21
4	(Denmark) M Conrad-Petersen (Denmark) M Pieler Kolding	21	21
(Thailand) B Issara (Thailand) N Puangpuapech	14	17
(Malaysia) Goh V S (Malaysia) Tan W K	21	21
(China) Wang YL (China) Zhang W	18	16

Quarterfinals
(Indonesia) M F Gideon (Indonesia) K S Sukamuljo	21	21
(Chinese Taipei) Chen H-l (Chinese Taipei) Wang C-l	11	17
4	(Denmark) M Conrad-Petersen (Denmark) M Pieler Kolding	21	16	13
(Malaysia) Goh V S (Malaysia) Tan W K	19	21	21

Semifinals
(Indonesia) M F Gideon (Indonesia) K S Sukamuljo	21	21
(Malaysia) Goh V S (Malaysia) Tan W K	15	17

=== Bottom half ===
First Round
(Malaysia) Hoon T H (Malaysia) Teo K S	21	15	21
(China) Liu C (China) Lu K	14	21	18
Q2	(India) K Chahal (India) D Khatri	9	4
5	(South Korea) Ko S-h (South Korea) Shin B-c	21	21
(India) A Francis (India) T Kona	12	9
(Chinese Taipei) Lee S-m (Chinese Taipei) Tsai C-h	21	21
(Egypt) A A El Khateeb (Egypt) A Kashkal	6	11
PFQ	(India) J Sanyal (India) S Sharma	21	21
(Japan) T Kamura (Japan) K Sonoda	21	21
(India) M A Raju (India) V G Prasad	9	14
(India) K Nandagopal (India) S Ramchandran	10	13
7	(Indonesia) A Pratama (Indonesia) R K Suwardi	21	21
(India) P J Chopra (India) A Dewalkar	21	21
Q1	(India) A K R Malgari (India) S Ravuri	17	16
(Malaysia) Koo K K (Malaysia) Tan B H	12	21
2	(South Korea) Kim G-j (South Korea) Kim S-r	21	23

Second Round
(Malaysia) Hoon T H (Malaysia) Teo K S	19	13
5	(South Korea) Ko S-h (South Korea) Shin B-c	21	21
(Chinese Taipei) Lee S-m (Chinese Taipei) Tsai C-h	21	21
PFQ	(India) J Sanyal (India) S Sharma	17	15
(Japan) T Kamura (Japan) K Sonoda	21	8	18
7	(Indonesia) A Pratama (Indonesia) R K Suwardi	10	21	21
(India) P J Chopra (India) A Dewalkar	18	15
2	(South Korea) Kim G-j (South Korea) Kim S-r	21	21

Quarterfinals
5	(South Korea) Ko S-h (South Korea) Shin B-c	18	21	21
(Chinese Taipei) Lee S-m (Chinese Taipei) Tsai C-h	21	15	19
7	(Indonesia) A Pratama (Indonesia) R K Suwardi	15	21	21
2	(South Korea) Kim G-j (South Korea) Kim S-r	21	17	19

Semifinals
5	(South Korea) Ko S-h (South Korea) Shin B-c	18	21	19
7	(Indonesia) A Pratama (Indonesia) R K Suwardi	21	6	21

=== Finals ===
Semifinals
(Indonesia) Markus Fernaldi Gideon (Indonesia) Kevin Sanjaya Sukamuljo	21	21
(Malaysia) Goh V Shem (Malaysia) Tan Wee Kiong	15	17
5	(South Korea) Ko Sung-hyun (South Korea) Shin Baek-cheol	18	21	19
7	(Indonesia) Angga Pratama (Indonesia) Ricky Karanda Suwardi	21	6	21

Final
(Indonesia) Markus Fernaldi Gideon (Indonesia) Kevin Sanjaya Sukamuljo	21	21
7	(Indonesia) Angga Pratama (Indonesia) Ricky Karanda Suwardi	17	13

== Women's doubles ==
=== Seeds ===
1. (Indonesia) Nitya Krishinda Maheswari / Greysia Polii (semifinals)
2. (Denmark) Christinna Pedersen / Kamilla Rytter Juhl (semifinals)
3. (Japan) Misaki Matsutomo / Ayaka Takahashi (champion)
4. (China) Tian Qing / Zhao Yunlei (withdrew)
5. (China) Tang Yuanting / Yu Yang (quarterfinals)
6. (South Korea) Jung Kyung-eun / Shin Seung-chan (second round)
7. (South Korea) Chang Ye-na / Lee So-hee (first round)
8. (Netherlands) Eefje Muskens / Selena Piek (quarterfinals)

=== Top half ===
First Round
1	(Indonesia) N K Maheswari (Indonesia) G Polii	21	21
(Egypt) N Ashraf (Egypt) M Eltanany	3	3
(India) G Asaji (India) K Wadkar	27	21
Q2	(India) N Patel (India) S Sharma	25	18
5	(China) Tang YT (China) Yu Y	21	18	21
(Japan) S Matsuo (Japan) M Naito	17	21	15
(Japan) Y Fukushima (Japan) S Hirota	14	13
(China) Huang YQ (China) Tang JH	21	21
3	(Japan) M Matsutomo (Japan) A Takahashi	21	21
(Chinese Taipei) Hsieh P-c (Chinese Taipei) Wu T-j	16	12
(Bulgaria) G Stoeva (Bulgaria) S Stoeva	21	21
(Germany) I Herttrich (Germany) B Michels	16	19
8	(Netherlands) E Muskens (Netherlands) S Piek	21	21
Q4	(India) R Anand (India) P Kour	3	2
(South Korea) Go A-r (South Korea) Yoo H-w	17	21	21
(India) J Gutta (India) A Ponnappa	21	14	17

Second Round
1	(Indonesia) N K Maheswari (Indonesia) G Polii	21	21
(India) G Asaji (India) K Wadkar	5	7
5	(China) Tang YT (China) Yu Y	21	21
(China) Huang YQ (China) Tang JH	10	17
3	(Japan) M Matsutomo (Japan) A Takahashi	21	21
(Bulgaria) G Stoeva (Bulgaria) S Stoeva	12	19
8	(Netherlands) E Muskens (Netherlands) S Piek	21	21
(South Korea) Go A-r (South Korea) Yoo H-w	17	19

Quarterfinals
1	(Indonesia) N K Maheswari (Indonesia) G Polii	21	21
5	(China) Tang YT (China) Yu Y	19	12
3	(Japan) M Matsutomo (Japan) A Takahashi	21	21
8	(Netherlands) E Muskens (Netherlands) S Piek	16	17

Semifinals
1	(Indonesia) N K Maheswari (Indonesia) G Polii	18	21	21
3	(Japan) M Matsutomo (Japan) A Takahashi	21	19	23

=== Bottom half ===
First Round
(Japan) N Fukuman (Japan) K Yonao	21	21
(India) P Gadre (India) N S Reddy	12	17
PFQ	(India) R Pillai (India) S Sanyal	4	4
6	(South Korea) Jung K-e (South Korea) Shin S-c	21	21
(India) Ch. Poornima (India) R Sahdev
Q1	BYE
Q3	(India) S Nagarkoti (India) P Naqvi	19	7
PFQ	(India) M Sahdev (India) S Santosh	21	21
(India) A Balan (India) P Sawant	14	10
(Thailand) J Kititharakul (Thailand) R Prajongjai	21	21
(China) Chen QC (China) Jia YF	14	25	21
7	(South Korea) Chang Y-n (South Korea) Lee S-h	21	23	13
PFQ	(India) K Antil (India) L Dahiya	7	3
(Indonesia) A S Awanda (Indonesia) N K Mahadewi Istirani	21	21
(Chinese Taipei) Hsu Y-c (Chinese Taipei) Pai Y-p	13	21	13
2	(Denmark) C Pedersen (Denmark) K Rytter Juhl	21	10	21

Second Round
(Japan) N Fukuman (Japan) K Yonao	21	23
6	(South Korea) Jung K-e (South Korea) Shin S-c	16	21
(India) Ch. Poornima (India) R Sahdev	16	7
PFQ	(India) M Sahdev (India) S Santosh	21	21
(Thailand) J Kititharakul (Thailand) R Prajongjai	19	17
(China) Chen QC (China) Jia YF	21	21
(Indonesia) A S Awanda (Indonesia) N K Mahadewi Istirani	8	18
2	(Denmark) C Pedersen (Denmark) K Rytter Juhl	21	21

Quarterfinals
(Japan) N Fukuman (Japan) K Yonao	21	21
PFQ	(India) M Sahdev (India) S Santosh	8	2
(China) Chen QC (China) Jia YF	15	15
2	(Denmark) C Pedersen (Denmark) K Rytter Juhl	21	21

Semifinals
(Japan) N Fukuman (Japan) K Yonao	14	22	21
2	(Denmark) C Pedersen (Denmark) K Rytter Juhl	21	20	17

=== Finals ===
Semifinals
1	(Indonesia) Nitya Krishinda Maheswari (Indonesia) Greysia Polii	18	21	21
3	(Japan) Misaki Matsutomo (Japan) Ayaka Takahashi	21	19	23
(Japan) Naoko Fukuman (Japan) Kurumi Yonao	14	22	21
2	(Denmark) Christinna Pedersen (Denmark) Kamilla Rytter Juhl	21	20	17

Final
3	(Japan) Misaki Matsutomo (Japan) Ayaka Takahashi	21	21
(Japan) Naoko Fukuman (Japan) Kurumi Yonao	18	18

== Mixed doubles ==
=== Seeds ===
1. (Indonesia) Tantowi Ahmad / Lilyana Natsir (withdrew)
2. (South Korea) Ko Sung-hyun / Kim Ha-na (semifinals)
3. (Denmark) Joachim Fischer Nielsen / Christinna Pedersen (quarterfinals)
4. (England) Chris Adcock / Gabrielle Adcock (first round)
5. (Indonesia) Praveen Jordan / Debby Susanto (withdrew)
6. (Hong Kong) Lee Chun Hei / Chau Hoi Wah (second round)
7. (China) Lu Kai / Huang Yaqiong (champion)
8. (South Korea) Shin Baek-cheol / Chae Yoo-jung (second round)

=== Top half ===
First Round
PFQ	(India) K Sharma (India) J Nashier	11	17
(India) V G Prasad (India) J Dewangan	21	21
PFQ	(Malaysia) Y Khrishnan (India) P Sawant	16	16
(China) Liu YC (China) Tang JH	21	21
8	(South Korea) Shin B-c (South Korea) Chae Y-j	21	23
(Netherlands) J Arends (Netherlands) S Piek	15	21
(Thailand) B Issara (Thailand) S Amitrapai	21	21
(France) R Labar (France) E Lefel	16	15
3	(Denmark) J Fischer Nielsen (Denmark) C Pedersen	21	21
Q4	(India) M R Raju (India) J. A Kowsar	8	18
(India) A Vishnu (India) A Balan	18	18
(Japan) K Sonoda (Japan) N Fukuman	21	21
6	(Hong Kong) Lee C H (Hong Kong) Chau H W	21	21
Q1	(India) S V Kumar (India) G Asaji	12	14
(Germany) M Fuchs (Germany) B Michels	13	16
(Indonesia) R Widianto (Indonesia) P R Dili	21	21

Second Round
(India) V G Prasad (India) J Dewangan	9	12
(China) Liu YC (China) Tang JH	21	21
8	(South Korea) Shin B-c (South Korea) Chae Y-j	20	19
(Thailand) B Issara (Thailand) S Amitrapai	22	21
3	(Denmark) J Fischer Nielsen (Denmark) C Pedersen	21	21
(Japan) K Sonoda (Japan) N Fukuman	13	14
6	(Hong Kong) Lee C H (Hong Kong) Chau H W	19	15
(Indonesia) R Widianto (Indonesia) P R Dili	21	21

Quarterfinals
(China) Liu YC (China) Tang JH	21	18	18
(Thailand) B Issara (Thailand) S Amitrapai	15	21	21
3	(Denmark) J Fischer Nielsen (Denmark) C Pedersen	25	19	21
(Indonesia) R Widianto (Indonesia) P R Dili	23	21	23

Semifinals
(Thailand) B Issara (Thailand) S Amitrapai	18	21	7
(Indonesia) R Widianto (Indonesia) P R Dili	21	13	21

=== Bottom half ===
First Round
Q3	(India) V Thakran (India) S Panchal	8	1
(United States) P Chew (United States) J Subandhi	21	21
(India) K Singh (India) R Sahdev	6	5
7	(China) Lu K (China) Huang YQ	21	21
(South Korea) Choi S-g (South Korea) Eom H-w	17	21	14
(India) P J Chopra (India) N S Reddy	21	17	21
(China) Wang YL (China) Chen QC	11	21	21
4	(England) C Adcock (England) G Adcock	21	17	13
Q2	(India) M Attri (India) A Ponnappa	21	21
(India) K Chaudhary (India) S Nagarkoti	7	3
(South Korea) Kim G-j (South Korea) Shin S-c	20	21	15
PFQ	(China) Zhang W (China) Jia YF	22	13	21
(Egypt) A Kashkal (Egypt) H Hosny	10	10
(Japan) K Kazuno (Japan) A Kurihara	21	21
(India) D Chaudhry (India) L Dahiya	6	6
2	(South Korea) Ko S-h (South Korea) Kim H-n	21	21

Second Round
(United States) P Chew (United States) J Subandhi	13	13
7	(China) Lu K (China) Huang YQ	21	21
(India) P J Chopra (India) N S Reddy	13	9
(China) Wang YL (China) Chen QC	21	21
Q2	(India) M Attri (India) A Ponnappa	10	17
PFQ	(China) Zhang W (China) Jia YF	21	21
(Japan) K Kazuno (Japan) A Kurihara	18	17
2	(South Korea) Ko S-h (South Korea) Kim H-n	21	21

Quarterfinals
7	(China) Lu K (China) Huang YQ	21	21
(China) Wang YL (China) Chen QC	18	16
PFQ	(China) Zhang W (China) Jia YF	8	11
2	(South Korea) Ko S-h (South Korea) Kim H-n	21	21

Semifinals
7	(China) Lu K (China) Huang YQ	21	17	21
2	(South Korea) Ko S-h (South Korea) Kim H-n	17	21	18

=== Finals ===
Semifinals
(Thailand) Bodin Issara (Thailand) Savitree Amitrapai	18	21	7
(Indonesia) Riky Widianto (Indonesia) Puspita Richi Dili	21	13	21
7	(China) Lu Kai (China) Huang Yaqiong	21	17	21
2	(South Korea) Ko Sung-hyun (South Korea) Kim Ha-na	17	21	18

Final
(Indonesia) Riky Widianto (Indonesia) Puspita Richi Dili	13	16
7	(China) Lu Kai (China) Huang Yaqiong	21	21

Preceded by 2015 India Super Series	India Open	Succeeded by 2017 India Super Series
Preceded by 2016 All England Super Series Premier	BWF Super Series; 2016 BWF Season	Succeeded by 2016 Malaysia Super Series Premier
