= Badminton at the 2014 Asian Games – Women's doubles =

Women's doubles at the 2014 Asian Games
- Venue: Gyeyang Gymnasium
- Dates: 24–27 September
- Competitors: 52 from 15 nations

Medalists
gold medal	Nitya Krishinda Maheswari; Greysia Polii	Indonesia
silver medal	Misaki Matsutomo; Ayaka Takahashi	Japan
bronze medal	Vivian Hoo; Woon Khe Wei	Malaysia
bronze medal	Tian Qing; Zhao Yunlei	China

The badminton women's doubles tournament at the 2014 Asian Games in Incheon took place from 24 September to 27 September at Gyeyang Gymnasium.

== Schedule ==
All times are Korea Standard Time (UTC+09:00)

Date	Time	Event
Wednesday, 24 September 2014	09:00	Round of 32
Wednesday, 24 September 2014	15:00	Round of 16
Thursday, 25 September 2014	13:50	Quarterfinals
Friday, 26 September 2014	18:30	Semifinals
Saturday, 27 September 2014	19:00	Gold medal match

== Results ==
Legend

- WO — Won by walkover

=== Final ===
Gold medal match
1	Misaki Matsutomo (JPN); Ayaka Takahashi (JPN)	15	9
7	Nitya Krishinda Maheswari (INA); Greysia Polii (INA)	21	21

=== Top half ===
Round of 32
Nangsal Tamang (NEP); Sara Devi Tamang (NEP)	4	13
Suci Rizky Andini (INA); Tiara Rosalia Nuraidah (INA)	21	21
Maisa Fathuhulla Ismail (MDV); Aminath Shahurunaaz Moosa (MDV)
Baataryn Khulangoo (MGL); Mönkhbayaryn Dulamsüren (MGL)	W	O
Wang Rong (MAC); Zhang Zhibo (MAC)	13	21	21
Shinta Mulia Sari (SIN); Yao Lei (SIN)	21	15	17
5	Wang Xiaoli (CHN); Yu Yang (CHN)	21	21
Chan Tsz Ka (HKG); Tse Ying Suet (HKG)	14	6
Vivian Hoo (MAS); Woon Khe Wei (MAS)	21	21
Chen Hsiao-huan (TPE); Lai Chia-wen (TPE)	15	6

Round of 16
1	Misaki Matsutomo (JPN); Ayaka Takahashi (JPN)	20	21	21
Suci Rizky Andini (INA); Tiara Rosalia Nuraidah (INA)	22	16	6
8	Duanganong Aroonkesorn (THA); Kunchala Voravichitchaikul (THA)	21	21
Baataryn Khulangoo (MGL); Mönkhbayaryn Dulamsüren (MGL)	3	2
4	Chang Ye-na (KOR); Kim So-yeong (KOR)	17	18
Wang Rong (MAC); Zhang Zhibo (MAC)	21	21
5	Wang Xiaoli (CHN); Yu Yang (CHN)	21	11	20
Vivian Hoo (MAS); Woon Khe Wei (MAS)	17	21	22

Quarterfinals
1	Misaki Matsutomo (JPN); Ayaka Takahashi (JPN)	21	21
8	Duanganong Aroonkesorn (THA); Kunchala Voravichitchaikul (THA)	14	12
Wang Rong (MAC); Zhang Zhibo (MAC)	15	21	19
Vivian Hoo (MAS); Woon Khe Wei (MAS)	21	19	21

Semifinals
1	Misaki Matsutomo (JPN); Ayaka Takahashi (JPN)	21	21
Vivian Hoo (MAS); Woon Khe Wei (MAS)	16	17

=== Bottom half ===
Round of 32
Cheng Wen-hsing (TPE); Hsieh Pei-chen (TPE)	18	21	25
Chau Hoi Wah (HKG); Poon Lok Yan (HKG)	21	17	23
Aminath Nabeeha Abdul Razzaq (MDV); Aishath Afnaan Rasheed (MDV)	8	5
7	Nitya Krishinda Maheswari (INA); Greysia Polii (INA)	21	21
Punam Gurung (NEP); Sichhya Shrestha (NEP)	6	4
Pradnya Gadre (IND); N. Sikki Reddy (IND)	21	21
Amelia Alicia Anscelly (MAS); Soong Fie Cho (MAS)	27	16
Puttita Supajirakul (THA); Sapsiree Taerattanachai (THA)	29	21
Palwasha Bashir (PAK); Mahoor Shahzad (PAK)	11	8
U Teng Iok (MAC); Wong Kit Ieng (MAC)	21	21

Round of 16
Cheng Wen-hsing (TPE); Hsieh Pei-chen (TPE)	17	21	22
7	Nitya Krishinda Maheswari (INA); Greysia Polii (INA)	21	16	24
Pradnya Gadre (IND); N. Sikki Reddy (IND)	16	21	14
3	Reika Kakiiwa (JPN); Miyuki Maeda (JPN)	21	19	21
Puttita Supajirakul (THA); Sapsiree Taerattanachai (THA)	17	19
6	Jung Kyung-eun (KOR); Kim Ha-na (KOR)	21	21
U Teng Iok (MAC); Wong Kit Ieng (MAC)	7	10
2	Tian Qing (CHN); Zhao Yunlei (CHN)	21	21

Quarterfinals
7	Nitya Krishinda Maheswari (INA); Greysia Polii (INA)	22	21
3	Reika Kakiiwa (JPN); Miyuki Maeda (JPN)	20	17
6	Jung Kyung-eun (KOR); Kim Ha-na (KOR)	13	21	19
2	Tian Qing (CHN); Zhao Yunlei (CHN)	21	19	21

Semifinals
7	Nitya Krishinda Maheswari (INA); Greysia Polii (INA)	21	19	21
2	Tian Qing (CHN); Zhao Yunlei (CHN)	17	21	17
