= Nitya Krishinda Maheswari =

Indonesian badminton player (born 1988)

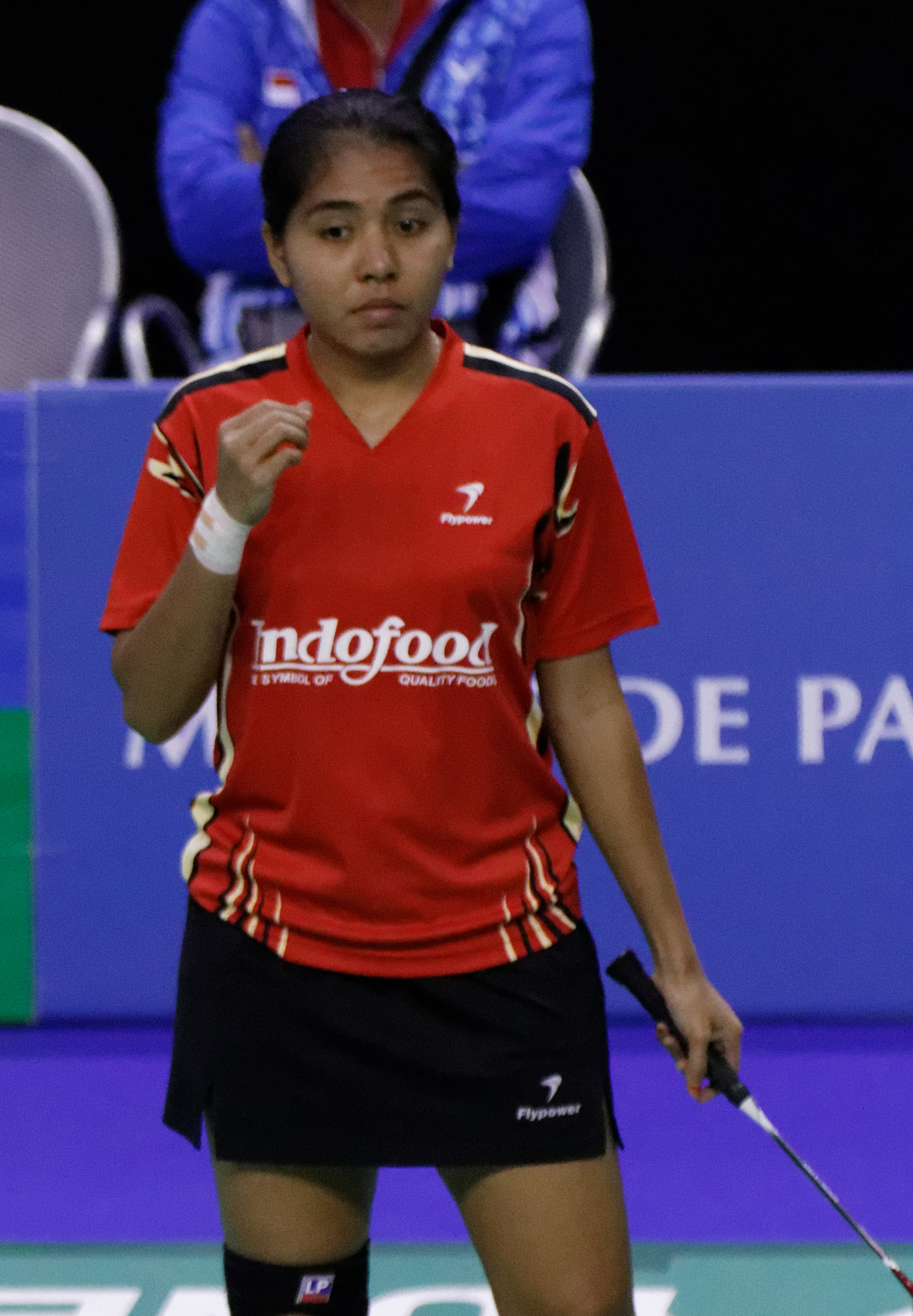
- Nitya Krishinda Maheswari at the 2013 French Open Superseries

Personal information
- Born: Nitya Krishinda Maheswari Korwa; 16 December 1988 (age 37) Blitar, East Java, Indonesia
- Height: 1.68 m (5 ft 6 in)

Sport
- Country: Indonesia
- Sport: Badminton
- Handedness: Right
- Retired: 2018

Women's doubles
- Highest ranking: 2 with Greysia Polii (10 March 2016)
- BWF profile
Medal record
Women's badminton
Representing Indonesia
World Championships
Bronze medal – third place	2015 Jakarta	Women's doubles
Sudirman Cup
Bronze medal – third place	2009 Guangzhou	Mixed team
Bronze medal – third place	2011 Qingdao	Mixed team
Bronze medal – third place	2015 Dongguan	Mixed team
Uber Cup
Bronze medal – third place	2010 Kuala Lumpur	Women's team
Asian Games
Gold medal – first place	2014 Incheon	Women's doubles
Bronze medal – third place	2010 Guangzhou	Women's team
Asian Championships
Bronze medal – third place	2016 Wuhan	Women's doubles
SEA Games
Gold medal – first place	2011 Jakarta–Palembang	Women's doubles
Silver medal – second place	2009 Vientiane	Women's team
Silver medal – second place	2011 Jakarta–Palembang	Women's team
Silver medal – second place	2013 Naypyidaw	Women's doubles
Summer Universiade
Bronze medal – third place	2007 Bangkok	Mixed team
World Junior Championships
Bronze medal – third place	2004 Richmond	Mixed team
Bronze medal – third place	2006 Incheon	Girls' doubles
Asian Junior Championships
Bronze medal – third place	2004 Hwacheon	Girls' team
Bronze medal – third place	2005 Jakarta	Girls' doubles
Bronze medal – third place	2005 Jakarta	Girls' team

Nitya Krishinda Maheswari Korwa (born 16 December 1988) is an Indonesian badminton player affiliated with Jaya Raya Jakarta and current coach in Indonesia national badminton team, specializing in doubles event. She won the women's doubles gold medals at the 2011 SEA Games and at the 2014 Asian Games.

== Career ==
Maheswari participated at the 2009 World Championships, where she reached rank 9 in the women's doubles together with Greysia Polii. In 2011, she won the gold medal at the SEA Games with Anneke Feinya Agustin. She also won the women's doubles gold medal at the 2014 Asian Games with Polii.

She won her first Superseries title paired with Greysia Polii at 2015 Korea Open.

In 2016, she and her partner Greysia Polii were qualified for the BWF Superseries Finals. However, they withdrew from the tournament due to Maheswari's scheduled knee surgery, and their position was replaced by Vivian Hoo and Woon Khe Wei.

== Personal life ==
Maheswari was born to a Papuan father and a Javanese mother. Her father Panus Korwa is a former national footballer who played for Arema Malang. Her cousin Lisa Rumbewas was a weightlifter and two-time Olympic silver medalist. Her uncle Levi, Lisa's father, was a bodybuilder.

== Achievements ==
=== BWF World Championships ===
Women's doubles
Year	Venue	Partner	Opponent	Score	Result
2015	Istora Senayan, Jakarta, Indonesia	(Indonesia) Greysia Polii	(China) Tian Qing (China) Zhao Yunlei	8–21, 16–21	Bronze

=== Asian Games ===
Women's doubles
Year	Venue	Partner	Opponent	Score	Result
2014	Gyeyang Gymnasium, Incheon, South Korea	(Indonesia) Greysia Polii	(Japan) Misaki Matsutomo (Japan) Ayaka Takahashi	21–15, 21–9	Gold

=== Asian Championships ===
Women's doubles
Year	Venue	Partner	Opponent	Score	Result
2016	Wuhan Sports Center Gymnasium, Wuhan, China	(Indonesia) Greysia Polii	(Japan) Naoko Fukuman (Japan) Kurumi Yonao	21–13, 19–21, 22–24	Bronze

=== SEA Games ===
Women's doubles
Year	Venue	Partner	Opponent	Score	Result
2011	Istora Senayan, Jakarta, Indonesia	(Indonesia) Anneke Feinya Agustin	(Indonesia) Vita Marissa (Indonesia) Nadya Melati	21–19, 21–17	Gold
2013	Wunna Theikdi Indoor Stadium, Naypyidaw, Myanmar	(Indonesia) Greysia Polii	(Malaysia) Vivian Hoo (Malaysia) Woon Khe Wei	17–21, 21–18, 17–21	Silver

=== ASEAN University Games ===
Women's doubles
Year	Venue	Partner	Opponent	Score	Result	Ref.
2008	Kuala Lumpur Badminton Stadium, Kuala Lumpur, Malaysia	(Indonesia) Nadya Melati	(Malaysia) Amelia Alicia Anscelly (Malaysia) Woon Khe Wei	21–23, 18–21	Bronze	

=== World Junior Championships ===
Girls' doubles
Year	Venue	Partner	Opponent	Score	Result
2006	Samsan World Gymnasium, Incheon, South Korea	(Indonesia) Pia Zebadiah Bernadet	(China) Ma Jin (China) Wang Xiaoli	14–21, 17–21	Bronze

=== Asian Junior Championships ===
Girls' doubles
Year	Venue	Partner	Opponent	Score	Result
2005	Tennis Indoor Senayan, Jakarta, Indonesia	(Indonesia) Greysia Polii	(China) Cheng Shu (China) Liao Jingmei	15–7, 15–17, 13–15	Bronze

=== BWF Superseries (2 titles, 3 runners-up) ===
The BWF Superseries, which was launched on 14 December 2006 and implemented in 2007, was a series of elite badminton tournaments, sanctioned by the Badminton World Federation (BWF). BWF Superseries levels were Superseries and Superseries Premier. A season of Superseries consisted of twelve tournaments around the world that had been introduced since 2011. Successful players were invited to the Superseries Finals, which were held at the end of each year.

Women's doubles
Year	Tournament	Partner	Opponent	Score	Result
2009	Singapore Open	(Indonesia) Greysia Polii	(China) Zhang Yawen (China) Zhao Tingting	14–21, 13–21	(silver) Runner-up
2015	Indonesia Open	(Indonesia) Greysia Polii	(China) Tang Jinhua (China) Tian Qing	11–21, 10–21	(silver) Runner-up
2015	Korea Open	(Indonesia) Greysia Polii	(South Korea) Chang Ye-na (South Korea) Lee So-hee	21–15, 21–18	(gold) Winner
2016	Singapore Open	(Indonesia) Greysia Polii	(Japan) Misaki Matsutomo (Japan) Ayaka Takahashi	Walkover	(gold) Winner
2016	Australian Open	(Indonesia) Greysia Polii	(China) Bao Yixin (China) Chen Qingchen	21–23, 17–21	(silver) Runner-up

BWF Super Series Finals tournament
BWF Super Series Premier tournament
BWF Super Series tournament

=== BWF Grand Prix (4 titles, 2 runners-up) ===
The BWF Grand Prix had two levels, the Grand Prix and Grand Prix Gold. It was a series of badminton tournaments sanctioned by the Badminton World Federation (BWF) and played between 2007 and 2017.

Women's doubles
Year	Tournament	Partner	Opponent	Score	Result
2011	Vietnam Open	(Indonesia) Anneke Feinya Agustin	(Singapore) Shinta Mulia Sari (Singapore) Yao Lei	23–21, 26–24	(gold) Winner
2013	Thailand Open	(Indonesia) Greysia Polii	(Japan) Yuriko Miki (Japan) Koharu Yonemoto	21–7, 21–13	(gold) Winner
2014	Swiss Open	(Indonesia) Greysia Polii	(China) Bao Yixin (China) Tang Jinhua	21–19, 16–21, 13–21	(silver) Runner-up
2014	Chinese Taipei Open	(Indonesia) Greysia Polii	(China) Wang Xiaoli (China) Yu Yang	21–18, 21–11	(gold) Winner
2015	Chinese Taipei Open	(Indonesia) Greysia Polii	(China) Luo Ying (China) Luo Yu	21–17, 21–17	(gold) Winner
2015	Indonesian Masters	(Indonesia) Greysia Polii	(China) Tang Yuanting (China) Yu Yang	18–21, 11–21	(silver) Runner-up

Mixed doubles
Year	Tournament	Partner	Opponent	Score	Result
2007	New Zealand Open	(Indonesia) Anggun Nugroho	(Indonesia) Devin Lahardi Fitriawan (Indonesia) Lita Nurlita	16–21, 15–21	(silver) Runner-up

BWF Grand Prix Gold tournament
BWF Grand Prix tournament

=== BWF International Challenge/Series/Satellite (3 titles, 2 runners-up) ===
Women's doubles
Year	Tournament	Partner	Opponent	Score	Result
2005	Surabaya Satellite	(Indonesia) Nadya Melati	(South Korea) Ha Jung-eun (South Korea) Kim Min-jung	13–15, 0–15	(silver) Runner-up
2005	India Satellite	(Indonesia) Nadya Melati	(Iran) Negin Amiripour (Iran) Behnaz Perzamanbin	15–1, 15–3	(gold) Winner
2006	Jakarta Satellite	(Indonesia) Nadya Melati	(Indonesia) Meiliana Jauhari (Indonesia) Purwati	21–14, 21–17	(gold) Winner
2006	Cheers Asian Satellite	(Indonesia) Nadya Melati	(Indonesia) Shendy Puspa Irawati (Indonesia) Devi Tika Permatasari	15–21, 21–17, 21–17	(gold) Winner
2006	Surabaya Satellite	(Indonesia) Nadya Melati	(Indonesia) Meiliana Jauhari (Indonesia) Purwati	16–21, 18–21	(silver) Runner-up

== Performance timeline ==
Key

W	Won	F	Finalist	SF	Semi-finalist
QF	Quarter-finalist	#R	Rounds 4, 3, 2, 1	RR	Round-robin stage
Q#	Qualification round	A	Absent	w/d	Withdrew
G	Gold	S	Silver	B	Bronze
NH	Not held	N/A	Not applicable	DNQ	Did not qualify

=== National team ===
- Junior level

Team events	2004	2005
Asian Junior Championships	B	B
World Junior Championships	B	NH

- Senior level

Team events	2007	2008	2009	2010	2011	2012	2013	2014	2015	2016	2017	2018
Summer Universiade	B	NH			A	NH	A	NH	A	NH	A	NH
Southeast Asian Games	A	NH	S	NH	S	NH			A	NH	A	NH
Asia Team Championships	NH									QF	NH	A
Asian Games	NH			B	NH			QF	NH			A
Uber Cup	NH	A	NH	B	NH	QF	NH	QF	NH	A	NH	QF
Sudirman Cup	A	NH	B	NH	B	NH	QF	NH	B	NH	A	NH

=== Individual competitions ===
- Junior level

Events	2005	
Asian Junior Championships	B	
World Junior Championships		B

- Senior level

Events	2009	2010	2011	2012	2013	2014	2015	2016
Southeast Asian Games	QF	NH	G	NH	S	NH	A	NH
Asian Championships							2R	B
Asian Games	NH	2R	NH			G	NH	
World Championships	3R			NH		QF	B	NH
Olympic Games	NH			DNQ	NH			QF

Tournament	BWF World Tour	Best
Tournament	2018	Best
Thailand Masters	2R	2R ('18)
Malaysia Masters	1R	QF ('15)
Indonesia Masters	2R	F ('15)
Lingshui China Masters	2R	2R ('18)
New Zealand Open	2R	F ('07)
Indonesia Open	1R	F ('15)
Thailand Open	QF	W ('13)

Tournament	BWF Superseries										Best
Tournament	2008	2009	2010	2011	2012	2013	2014	2015	2016	2017	Best
Singapore Open		F	QF	A	QF	SF	QF	A	W	A	W ('16)
Australian Open	N/A						A	QF	F	A	F ('16)
Indonesia Open		2R	2R	2R	1R	QF	2R	F	2R	A	F ('15)
Korea Open	1R	A		1R	1R	A	SF	W	A		W ('15)
Superseries Finals	DNQ						w/d	SF	w/d	DNQ	SF ('15)

Tournament	BWF Grand Prix and Grand Prix Gold											Best
Tournament	2007	2008	2009	2010	2011	2012	2013	2014	2015	2016	2017	Best
Malaysia Masters	NH		A						QF	A		QF ('15)
Swiss Open	N/A				A	1R	1R	F	A			F ('14)
New Zealand Open	F			NH	N/A	NH	A					F ('07)
Chinese Taipei Open				w/d	2R	A		W	W	A		W ('14, '15)
Vietnam Open	A			SF	W	A						W ('11)
Thailand Open				NH		A	W	NH	w/d	A		W ('13)
Indonesian Masters	NH			2R	SF	QF	QF	A	F	A	NH	F ('15)

== Record against selected opponents ==
Women's doubles results against World Superseries finalists, World Superseries Finals semifinalists, World Championships semifinalists, and Olympic quarterfinalists paired with:

=== Greysia Polii ===
- (China) Bao Yixin & Chen Qingchen 0–1
- (China) Bao Yixin & Cheng Shu 0–1
- (China) Bao Yixin & Tang Jinhua 0–5
- (China) Cheng Shu & Zhao Yunlei 1–2
- (China) Luo Ying & Luo Yu 4–2
- (China) Tang Jinhua & Tian Qing 0–2
- (China) Tang Yuanting & Ma Jin 1–2
- (China) Tang Yuanting & Yu Yang (F) 2–5
- (China) Tian Qing & Zhao Yunlei 2–4
- (China) Wang Xiaoli & Ma Jin 0–3
- (China) Yu Yang (F) & Du Jing 0–2
- (China) Yu Yang (F) & Wang Xiaoli 3–3
- (China) Yu Yang (F) & Zhong Qianxin 1–0
- (China) Zhao Tingting & Zhang Yawen 0–2
- (Chinese Taipei) Chien Yu-chin & Cheng Wen-hsing 0–1
- (Denmark) Christinna Pedersen & Kamilla Rytter Juhl 5–2
- (Denmark) Kamilla Rytter Juhl & Lena Frier Kristiansen 2–1
- (India) Jwala Gutta & Ashwini Ponnappa 2–1
- (Japan) Misaki Matsutomo & Ayaka Takahashi 2–3
- (Japan) Miyuki Maeda & Satoko Suetsuna 2–1
- (Japan) Naoko Fukuman & Kurumi Yonao 5–1
- (Japan) Reika Kakiiwa & Miyuki Maeda 2–3
- (Japan) Shizuka Matsuo & Mami Naito 6–0
- (South Korea) Chang Ye-na & Lee So-hee 3–1
- (South Korea) Jung Kyung-eun & Kim Ha-na 1–0
- (South Korea) Jung Kyung-eun & Shin Seung-chan 1–1
- (South Korea) Lee So-hee & Shin Seung-chan 2–0
- (Malaysia) Chin Eei Hui & Wong Pei Tty 1–1
- (Singapore) Shinta Mulia Sari & Yao Lei 3–0
- (Thailand) Kunchala Voravichitchaikul & Duanganong Aroonkesorn 2–0

=== Anneke Feinya Agustin ===
- (China) Bao Yixin & Zhong Qianxin 0–3
- (China) Luo Ying & Luo Yu 0–1
- (China) Tang Jinhua & Xia Huan 0–1
- (China) Yu Yang (F) & Wang Xiaoli 0–2
- (China) Zhao Yunlei & Tian Qing 0–2
- (Chinese Taipei) Chien Yu-chin & Cheng Wen-hsing 1–0
- (Denmark) Christinna Pedersen & Kamilla Rytter Juhl 1–0
- (Hong Kong) Tse Ying Suet & Poon Lok Yan 0–1
- (Indonesia) Nadya Melati & Vita Marissa 1–0
- (India) Jwala Gutta & Ashwini Ponnappa 0–1
- (Japan) Misaki Matsutomo & Ayaka Takahashi 0–1
- (Japan) Miyuki Maeda & Satoko Suetsuna 0–3
- (Japan) Mizuki Fujii & Reika Kakiiwa 0–3
- (South Korea) Eom Hye-won & Chang Ye-na 1–0
- (South Korea) Ha Jung-eun & Kim Min-jung 1–0
- (South Korea) Jung Kyung-eun & Kim Ha-na 1–2
- (South Korea) Lee So-hee & Shin Seung-chan 1–0
- (Singapore) Shinta Mulia Sari & Yao Lei 3–1
