= Marylen Ng =

Malaysian badminton player (born 1987)

Marylen Ng 吴嘉欣
Personal information
- Born: Ng Poau Leng; 19 December 1987 (age 38) Sabah, Malaysia

Sport
- Country: Malaysia
- Sport: Badminton

Women's & mixed doubles
- Highest ranking: 50 (WD 19 April 2012)
- BWF profile
Medal record
Women's badminton
Representing Malaysia
Southeast Asian Games
Bronze medal – third place	2011 Jakarta	Women's team

Marylen Ng Poau Leng (born 19 December 1987) is a badminton player from Malaysia. She was the women's doubles champion at the 2010 National Circuit Grand Prix Finals with Woon Khe Wei. Partnered with Lim Yin Loo, she became the semi-finalist at the 2008 Vietnam Open a BWF Grand Prix tournament. She represented her country at the 2010 Asian Games and 2011 Southeast Asian Games, and helped the team win the bronze medal in 2011 Southeast Asian Games.

== Achievements ==
=== BWF International Challenge/Series ===
Women's doubles

Year	Tournament	Partner	Opponent	Score	Result
2011	Malaysia International	(Malaysia) Lim Yin Loo	(Japan) Naoko Fukuman (Japan) Kurumi Yonao	16–21, 13–21	(silver) Runner-up

BWF International Challenge tournament
BWF International Series tournament
BWF Future Series tournament
