= 2016 Swiss Open Grand Prix Gold =

Tournament details
- Dates: 15 – 20 March 2016
- Level: Grand Prix Gold
- Total prize money: US$120,000
- Venue: St. Jakobshalle
- Location: Basel, Switzerland

Champions
- Men's singles: (India) H. S. Prannoy
- Women's singles: (China) He Bingjiao
- Men's doubles: (Denmark) Kim Astrup (Denmark) A S Rasmussen
- Women's doubles: (Japan) Shizuka Matsuo (Japan) Mami Naito
- Mixed doubles: (China) Wang Yilyu (China) Chen Qingchen

The 2016 Swiss Open Grand Prix Gold was the fifth Grand Prix's badminton tournament of the 2016 BWF Grand Prix and Grand Prix Gold. The tournament was held at the St. Jakobshalle in Basel, Switzerland on 15–20 March 2016 and had a total purse of $120,000.

== Men's singles ==
=== Seeds ===
1. (Malaysia) Lee Chong Wei (withdrawn)
2. (Chinese Taipei) Chou Tien-chen (quarterfinals)
3. (India) Srikanth Kidambi (withdrawn)
4. (China) Wang Zhengming (second round)
5. (India) Kashyap Parupalli (withdrawn)
6. (England) Rajiv Ouseph (third round)
7. (Germany) Marc Zwiebler (final)
8. (Japan) Sho Sasaki (first round)
9. (Chinese Taipei) Hsu Jen-hao (quarterfinals)
10. (Thailand) Boonsak Ponsana (second round)
11. (India) Ajay Jayaram (second round)
12. (Denmark) Hans-Kristian Vittinghus (withdrawn)
13. (India) H. S. Prannoy (champion)
14. (China) Xue Song (quarterfinals)
15. (Japan) Takuma Ueda (first round)
16. (Thailand) Tanongsak Saensomboonsuk (quarterfinals)

=== Finals ===
Quarterfinals
9	(Chinese Taipei) Hsu Jen-hao	10	17
(Chinese Taipei) Wang Tzu-wei	21	21
16	(Thailand) Tanongsak Saensomboonsuk	18	24	9
13	(India) H. S. Prannoy	21	22	21
(Sweden) Henri Hurskainen	w	/	o
14	(China) Xue Song
7	(Germany) Marc Zwiebler	21	21	21
2	(Chinese Taipei) Chou Tien-chen	23	14	19

Semifinals
(Chinese Taipei) Wang Tzu-wei	21	14	21
13	(India) H. S. Prannoy	12	21	23
(Sweden) Henri Hurskainen	11	21	15
7	(Germany) Marc Zwiebler	21	10	21

Final
13	(India) H. S. Prannoy	21	21
7	(Germany) Marc Zwiebler	18	15

=== Top half ===
==== Section 1 ====
First Round
PFR	(Switzerland) C Kirchmayr	17	15
(Denmark) R Fladberg	21	21
PFR	(Switzerland) K Schaffluetzel	8	8
(Germany) D Domke	21	21
9	(Chinese Taipei) Hsu J-h	15	29	21
(Israel) M Zilberman	21	27	17
(Brazil) Y C de Oliveira	13	15
(Spain) P Abián	21	21

Second Round
(Denmark) R Fladberg	21	16	12
(Germany) D Domke	12	21	21
9	(Chinese Taipei) Hsu J-h	21	21
(Spain) P Abián	14	18

Third Round
(Germany) D Domke	21	14	9
9	(Chinese Taipei) Hsu J-h	17	21	21

==== Section 2 ====
First Round
PFR	(Bulgaria) S Makarski	19	5
(Chinese Taipei) Wang T-w	21	21
(Malaysia) Soon J V	21	21
PFR	(Switzerland) A Dumartheray	10	16
15	(Japan) T Ueda	15	18
(Denmark) A Antonsen	21	21
(Republic of Ireland) J Magee	12	13
(Bulgaria) B Kisyov	21	21

Second Round
(Chinese Taipei) Wang T-w	21	19	21
(Malaysia) Soon J V	19	21	13
(Denmark) A Antonsen	21	21
(Bulgaria) B Kisyov	18	10

Third Round
(Chinese Taipei) Wang T-w	21	21
(Denmark) A Antonsen	18	14

==== Section 3 ====
First Round
4	(China) Wang ZM	21	21
PFR	(Uzbekistan) O Savatugin	8	6
(India) S Verma	21	24
(Denmark) E Holst	17	22
16	(Thailand) T Saensomboonsuk	21	21
(Denmark) K Bruun	12	10
(Indonesia) F A Kholik	21	21
(Ukraine) A Pochtarev	15	9

Second Round
4	(China) Wang ZM	19	20
(India) S Verma	21	22
16	(Thailand) T Saensomboonsuk	17	21	21
(Indonesia) F A Kholik	21	16	4

Third Round
(India) S Verma	15	19
16	(Thailand) T Saensomboonsuk	21	21

==== Section 4 ====
First Round
6	(England) R Ouseph	21	21
(Czech Republic) J Frohlich	13	10
PFR	(France) G-U Samson	12	6
(Sweden) M Borg	21	21
13	(India) H. S. Prannoy	21	21
(Finland) K Koljonen	19	19
(Germany) L Schaenzler	21	21
(Uzbekistan) A Bakhshullaev	18	13

Second Round
6	(England) R Ouseph	21	21
(Sweden) M Borg	14	12
13	(India) H. S. Prannoy	21	21
(Germany) L Schaenzler	16	13

Third Round
6	(England) R Ouseph	13	18
13	(India) H. S. Prannoy	21	21

=== Bottom half ===
==== Section 5 ====
First Round
(Czech Republic) P Koukal	21	21
PFR	(England) M Spencer-Smith	8	11
(Denmark) C L Thomsen	19	21	14
10	(Thailand) B Ponsana	21	11	21
PFR	(Germany) P Discher	12	11
(Italy) I B Ade Chandra	21	21
(Sweden) H Hurskainen	21	21
8	(Japan) S Sasaki	17	14

Second Round
(Czech Republic) P Koukal	17	21	21
10	(Thailand) B Ponsana	21	14	19
(Italy) I B Ade Chandra	21	11	14
(Sweden) H Hurskainen	10	21	21

Third Round
(Czech Republic) P Koukal	16	18
(Sweden) H Hurskainen	21	21

==== Section 6 ====
First Round
(Norway) M Myhre	21	15	21
(Slovenia) I Utrosa	12	21	16
(Netherlands) E Meijs	17	8
14	(China) Xue S	21	21
(Republic of Ireland) S Evans	21	21	11
(Malaysia) I Z Zainuddin	18	23	21
(Indonesia) M B Pangisthu	21	21
PFR	(Luxembourg) R Mann	18	16

Second Round
(Norway) M Myhre	17	15
14	(China) Xue S	21	21
(Malaysia) I Z Zainuddin	17	9^{r}
(Indonesia) M B Pangisthu	21	17

Third Round
14	(China) Xue S	21	21
(Indonesia) M B Pangisthu	16	11

==== Section 7 ====
First Round
PFR	(Algeria) M A Belarbi	8	4
(Japan) K Tago	21	21
(Malaysia) Chiang J S	8	17
11	(India) A Jayaram	21	21
(Finland) K Lehikoinen	21	21
(Brazil) D Paiola	15	15
PFR	(Switzerland) J Koenig	8	13
7	(Germany) M Zwiebler	21	21

Second Round
(Japan) K Tago	23	21
11	(India) A Jayaram	21	18
(Finland) K Lehikoinen	16	18
7	(Germany) M Zwiebler	21	21

Third Round
(Japan) K Tago	13	21	9
7	(Germany) M Zwiebler	21	12	21

==== Section 8 ====
First Round
PFR	(Switzerland) M Bonny	14	21	6
(India) B S Praneeth	21	13	21
(Uzbekistan) A Savatyugin	21	21
PFR	(Switzerland) S Manjaly	12	9
PFR	(Algeria) A Hamek	11	9
(Malaysia) Z Zulkiffli	21	21
(Brazil) A Y Tjong	18	18
2	(Chinese Taipei) Chou T-c	21	21

Second Round
(India) B S Praneeth	21	21
(Uzbekistan) A Savatyugin	7	10
(Malaysia) Z Zulkiffli	21	12	12
2	(Chinese Taipei) Chou T-c	17	21	21

Third Round
(India) B S Praneeth	19	6
2	(Chinese Taipei) Chou T-c	21	21

== Women's singles ==
=== Seeds ===
1. (India) Saina Nehwal (semifinals)
2. (Thailand) Ratchanok Intanon (second round)
3. (China) Wang Yihan (final)
4. (Japan) Akane Yamaguchi (first round)
5. (China) Sun Yu (semifinals)
6. (India) P. V. Sindhu (quarterfinals)
7. (Japan) Sayaka Sato (quarterfinals)
8. (Thailand) Busanan Ongbumrungpan (quarterfinals)

=== Finals ===
Semifinals
1	(India) Saina Nehwal	11	19
3	(China) Wang Yihan	21	21
5	(China) Sun Yu	15	19
(China) He Bingjiao	21	21

Final
3	(China) Wang Yihan	16	10
(China) He Bingjiao	21	21

=== Top half ===
==== Section 1 ====
First Round
1	(India) S Nehwal	21	21
(Germany) K Schnasse	7	15
(Bulgaria) P Nedelcheva	21	9	8
(Czech Republic) K Gavnholt	12	21	21
7	(Japan) S Sato	21	21
(Russia) K Polikarpova	18	16
(Chinese Taipei) Hsu Y-c	21	21
(Denmark) N K Rohde	16	13

Second Round
1	(India) S Nehwal	21	21
(Czech Republic) K Gavnholt	18	17
7	(Japan) S Sato	21	21
(Chinese Taipei) Hsu Y-c	8	13

Quarterfinals
1	(India) S Nehwal	13	21	21
7	(Japan) S Sato	21	15	14

==== Section 2 ====
First Round
3	(China) Wang YH	21	21
(Switzerland) S Jaquet	16	12
(Denmark) L Kjaersfeldt	14	19
PFQ	(Turkey) N Yigit	21	21
8	(Thailand) B Ongbumrungpan	21	21
Q1	(Denmark) M Poulsen	15	15
Q2	(Denmark) M Blichfeldt	16	21	21
Q4	(England) F M Chapman	21	15	10

Second Round
3	(China) Wang YH	21	21
PFQ	(Turkey) N Yigit	10	9
8	(Thailand) B Ongbumrungpan	21	21
Q2	(Denmark) M Blichfeldt	18	15

Quarterfinals
3	(China) Wang YH	21	21
8	(Thailand) B Ongbumrungpan	13	10

=== Bottom half ===
==== Section 3 ====
First Round
Q3	(Chinese Taipei) Chen H-h	21	9	11
(United States) R Schafer	15	21	21
(Japan) M Mitani	12	7
5	(China) Sun Y	21	21
(Bulgaria) L Zetchiri	21	10	16
(Thailand) P Buranaprasertsuk	18	21	21
PFQ	(Ukraine) M Ulitina	21	22
4	(Japan) A Yamaguchi	19	20

Second Round
(United States) R Schafer	7	8
5	(China) Sun Y	21	21
(Thailand) P Buranaprasertsuk	21	21
PFQ	(Ukraine) M Ulitina	13	14

Quarterfinals
5	(China) Sun Y	21	21
(Thailand) P Buranaprasertsuk	13	15

==== Section 4 ====
First Round
(Chinese Taipei) Pai Y-p	15	21	21
(Malaysia) Tee J Y	21	18	10
PFQ	(Republic of Ireland) C Magee	19	10
6	(India) P. V. Sindhu	21	21
(China) He BJ	21	18	21
(Thailand) N Jindapol	14	21	9
(Germany) O Konon	18	11
2	(Thailand) R Intanon	21	21

Second Round
(Chinese Taipei) Pai Y-p	16	16
6	(India) P. V. Sindhu	21	21
(China) He BJ	14	21	21
2	(Thailand) R Intanon	21	18	13

Quarterfinals
6	(India) P. V. Sindhu	13	15
(China) He BJ	21	21

== Men's doubles ==
=== Seeds ===
1. (Indonesia) Mohammad Ahsan / Hendra Setiawan (withdrawn)
2. (China) Chai Biao / Hong Wei (withdrawn)
3. (China) Liu Xiaolong / Qiu Zihan (second round)
4. (Chinese Taipei) Lee Sheng-mu / Tsai Chia-hsin (final)
5. (Malaysia) Goh V Shem / Tan Wee Kiong (second round)
6. (Malaysia) Koo Kien Keat / Tan Boon Heong (semifinals)
7. (Japan) Takeshi Kamura / Keigo Sonoda (first round)
8. (China) Wang Yilyu / Zhang Wen (quarterfinals)

=== Finals ===
Semifinals
(Denmark) Mathias Christiansen (Denmark) David Daugaard	18	12
(Denmark) Kim Astrup (Denmark) Anders Skaarup Rasmussen	21	21
4	(Chinese Taipei) Lee Sheng-mu (Chinese Taipei) Tsai Chia-hsin	21	21	21
6	(Malaysia) Koo Kien Keat (Malaysia) Tan Boon Heong	23	17	10

Final
(Denmark) Kim Astrup (Denmark) Anders Skaarup Rasmussen	21	21
4	(Chinese Taipei) Lee Sheng-mu (Chinese Taipei) Tsai Chia-hsin	8	15

=== Top half ===
==== Section 1 ====
First Round
PFQ	(Japan) T Shimada (Japan) Y Takeuchi	16	21	18
(Thailand) B Issara (Thailand) N Puangpuapech	21	15	21
PFQ	(Germany) F Holzer (Germany) J Pistorius	21	21
Q3	(Indonesia) T Gustaman (Switzerland) Y Hogianto	11	10
5	(Malaysia) Goh V S (Malaysia) Tan W K	21	21
Q1	(Switzerland) M Bonny (Switzerland) C Kirchmayr	6	14
PFQ	(Switzerland) C Debetaz (Switzerland) A Dumartheray	11	9
(Denmark) M Christiansen (Denmark) D Daugaard	21	21

Second Round
(Thailand) B Issara (Thailand) N Puangpuapech	21	23
PFQ	(Germany) F Holzer (Germany) J Pistorius	8	21
5	(Malaysia) Goh V S (Malaysia) Tan W K	17	14
(Denmark) M Christiansen (Denmark) D Daugaard	21	21

Quarterfinals
(Thailand) B Issara (Thailand) N Puangpuapech	9	19
(Denmark) M Christiansen (Denmark) D Daugaard	21	21

==== Section 2 ====
First Round
3	(China) Liu XL (China) Qiu ZH	21	21	21
(England) M Nottingham (England) H Towler	18	23	13
(Germany) M Lamsfuss (Germany) M E Seidel	21	21
PFQ	(Uzbekistan) A Bakhshullaev (Uzbekistan) A Savatyugin	11	9
7	(Japan) T Kamura (Japan) K Sonoda	15	19
(Denmark) K Astrup (Denmark) A S Rasmussen	21	21
Q2	(Switzerland) A Ruhanda (Indonesia) K S Darma	19	9
(Chinese Taipei) Chen H-l (Chinese Taipei) Wang C-l	21	21

Second Round
3	(China) Liu XL (China) Qiu ZH	18	22	16
(Germany) M Lamsfuss (Germany) M E Seidel	21	20	21
(Denmark) K Astrup (Denmark) A S Rasmussen	21	21
(Chinese Taipei) Chen H-l (Chinese Taipei) Wang C-l	19	18

Quarterfinals
(Germany) M Lamsfuss (Germany) M E Seidel	17	15
(Denmark) K Astrup (Denmark) A S Rasmussen	21	21

=== Bottom half ===
==== Section 3 ====
First Round
(Republic of Ireland) J Magee (Republic of Ireland) S Magee	12	13
(Chinese Taipei) Lee J-h (Chinese Taipei) Lee Y	21	21
Q4	(Bulgaria) S Makarski (Switzerland) G Tripet	8	8
8	(China) Wang YY (China) Zhang W	21	21
(Scotland) M Campbell (Scotland) P Machugh	21	21
PFQ	(Algeria) M A Belarbi (Algeria) A Hamek	11	9
PFQ	(England) C Coles (Scotland) A Hall	15	8
4	(Chinese Taipei) Lee S-m (Chinese Taipei) Tsai C-h	21	21

Second Round
(Chinese Taipei) Lee J-h (Chinese Taipei) Lee Y	18	21	16
8	(China) Wang YY (China) Zhang W	21	16	21
(Scotland) M Campbell (Scotland) P Machugh	14	11
4	(Chinese Taipei) Lee S-m (Chinese Taipei) Tsai C-h	21	21

Quarterfinals
8	(China) Wang YY (China) Zhang W	18	16
4	(Chinese Taipei) Lee S-m (Chinese Taipei) Tsai C-h	21	21

==== Section 4 ====
First Round
(Thailand) D Puavaranukroh (Thailand) K Kittinupong	20	21	21
(Germany) R Beck (Germany) P Kaesbauer	22	15	16
(France) B Kersaudy (France) G Mittelheisser	17	8
6	(Malaysia) Koo K K (Malaysia) Tan B H	21	21
(England) M Ellis (England) C Langridge	21	21
(Indonesia) B Angriawan (Indonesia) R A Saputra	16	19
(Chinese Taipei) Liao M-c (Chinese Taipei) Tseng M-h	21	21
PFQ	(Germany) D Benz (Germany) A Heinz	10	16

Second Round
(Thailand) D Puavaranukroh (Thailand) K Kittinupong	10	16
6	(Malaysia) Koo K K (Malaysia) Tan B H	21	21
(England) M Ellis (England) C Langridge	21	21
(Chinese Taipei) Liao M-c (Chinese Taipei) Tseng M-h	18	13

Quarterfinals
6	(Malaysia) Koo K K (Malaysia) Tan B H	21	19	21
(England) M Ellis (England) C Langridge	16	21	15

== Women's doubles ==
=== Seeds ===
1. (China) Tian Qing / Zhao Yunlei (quarterfinals)
2. (Netherlands) Eefje Muskens / Selena Piek (second round)
3. (Japan) Naoko Fukuman / Kurumi Yonao (final)
4. (Malaysia) Vivian Hoo Kah Mun / Woon Khe Wei (quarterfinals)
5. (Japan) Shizuka Matsuo / Mami Naito (champion)
6. (Bulgaria) Gabriela Stoeva / Stefani Stoeva (second round)
7. (China) Chen Qingchen / Jia Yifan (quarterfinals)
8. (Thailand) Jongkonphan Kittiharakul / Rawinda Prajongjai (semifinals)

=== Finals ===
Semifinals
5	(Japan) Shizuka Matsuo (Japan) Mami Naito	21	21
8	(Thailand) Jongkonphan Kittiharakul (Thailand) Rawinda Prajongjai	12	14
3	(Japan) Naoko Fukuman (Japan) Kurumi Yonao	21	21
(China) Huang Yaqiong (China) Tang Jinhua	17	14

Final
5	(Japan) Shizuka Matsuo (Japan) Mami Naito	21	12	21
3	(Japan) Naoko Fukuman (Japan) Kurumi Yonao	16	21	12

=== Top half ===
==== Section 1 ====
First Round
1	(China) Tian Q (China) Zhao YL	21	21
(Chinese Taipei) Chen H-h (Chinese Taipei) Huang M-c	9	17
(Sweden) C Nistad (Sweden) E Wengberg
Q2	BYE
5	(Japan) S Matsuo (Japan) M Naito	21	21
(Turkey) O Bayrak (Turkey) N Yigit	6	17
(Chinese Taipei) Hsu Y-c (Chinese Taipei) Pai Y-p	w	/	o
PFQ	(Germany) J Karnott (Germany) F Volkmann

Second Round
1	(China) Tian Q (China) Zhao YL	21	21
(Sweden) C Nistad (Sweden) E Wengberg	9	14
5	(Japan) S Matsuo (Japan) M Naito	21	21
(Chinese Taipei) Hsu Y-c (Chinese Taipei) Pai Y-p	14	17

Quarterfinals
1	(China) Tian Q (China) Zhao YL	25	16
5	(Japan) S Matsuo (Japan) M Naito	27	21

==== Section 2 ====
First Round
4	(Malaysia) Vivian Hoo K M (Malaysia) Woon K W	21	21
PFQ	(Switzerland) N Fankhauser (Malaysia) S Saniru	11	11
(England) H Olver (England) L Smith	21	21
(Brazil) Lo Vicente (Brazil) Lu Vicente	12	14
8	(Thailand) J Kittiharakul (Thailand) R Prajongjai	21	21
(Netherlands) S Barning (Netherlands) I Tabeling	4	8
PFQ	(Czech Republic) K Gavnholt (Switzerland) S Mattle	w	/	o
(Germany) I Herttrich (Germany) B Michels

Second Round
4	(Malaysia) Vivian Hoo K M (Malaysia) Woon K W	21	19	21
(England) H Olver (England) L Smith	14	21	16
8	(Thailand) J Kittiharakul (Thailand) R Prajongjai	21	21
PFQ	(Czech Republic) K Gavnholt (Switzerland) S Mattle	14	11

Quarterfinals
4	(Malaysia) Vivian Hoo K M (Malaysia) Woon K W	16	16
8	(Thailand) J Kittiharakul (Thailand) R Prajongjai	21	21

=== Bottom half ===
==== Section 3 ====
First Round
Q1	BYE
Q4	BYE
PFQ	(Switzerland) S Keller (Switzerland) Y Keller	8	8
7	(China) Chen QC (China) Jia YF	21	21
(Germany) B Bellenberg (Germany) E Janssens
(Denmark) M Fruergaard (Denmark) S Thygesen	w	/	o
Q3	BYE
3	(Japan) N Fukuman (Japan) K Yonao

Second Round
BYE
7	(China) Chen QC (China) Jia YF
(Denmark) M Fruergaard (Denmark) S Thygesen	12	18
3	(Japan) N Fukuman (Japan) K Yonao	21	21

Quarterfinals
7	(China) Chen QC (China) Jia YF	15	19
3	(Japan) N Fukuman (Japan) K Yonao	21	21

==== Section 4 ====
First Round
PFQ	(Switzerland) C Burkart (Switzerland) T Girona	7	8
(Thailand) P Supajirakul (Thailand) S Taerattanachai	21	21
(Germany) J Goliszewski (Germany) C Nelte	16	16
6	(Bulgaria) G Stoeva (Bulgaria) S Stoeva	21	21
(Germany) L Efler (Germany) L Kaepplein
(China) Huang YQ (China) Tang JH	w	/	o
(Chinese Taipei) Hsieh P-c (Chinese Taipei) Wu T-j	18	21	24
2	(Netherlands) E Muskens (Netherlands) S Piek	21	17	26

Second Round
(Thailand) P Supajirakul (Thailand) S Taerattanachai	21	21
6	(Bulgaria) G Stoeva (Bulgaria) S Stoeva	19	14
(China) Huang YQ (China) Tang JH	19	21	21
2	(Netherlands) E Muskens (Netherlands) S Piek	21	18	17

Quarterfinals
(Thailand) P Supajirakul (Thailand) S Taerattanachai	21	19	12
(China) Huang YQ (China) Tang JH	19	21	21

== Mixed doubles ==
=== Seeds ===
1. (Indonesia) Tontowi Ahmad / Liliyana Natsir (withdrawn)
2. (China) Liu Cheng / Bao Yixin (second round)
3. (China) Xu Chen / Ma Jin (second round)
4. (England) Chris Adcock / Gabrielle Adcock (withdrawn)
5. (Indonesia) Praveen Jordan / Debby Susanto (withdrawn)
6. (Malaysia) Chan Peng Soon / Goh Liu Ying (withdrawn)
7. (Netherlands) Jacco Arends / Selena Piek (first round)
8. (Indonesia) Edi Subaktiar / Gloria Emanuelle Widjaja (second round)

=== Finals ===
Semifinals
(Thailand) Bodin Issara (Thailand) Savitree Amitrapai	21	20	21
(Chinese Taipei) Liao Min-chun (Chinese Taipei) Chen Hsiao-huan	19	22	18
(Japan) Keigo Sonoda (Japan) Naoko Fukuman	21	16	17
(China) Wang Yilyu (China) Chen Qingchen	19	21	21

Final
(Thailand) Bodin Issara (Thailand) Savitree Amitrapai	21	16	15
(China) Wang Yilyu (China) Chen Qingchen	19	21	21

=== Top half ===
==== Section 1 ====
First Round
PFQ	(Switzerland) A Dumartheray (Switzerland) S Jaquet	21	21
Q1	(Germany) D Benz (Germany) T Wurm	13	18
(Russia) V Durkin (Russia) N Vislova	18	22
(England) M Nottingham (England) E Westwood	21	24
PFQ	(Chinese Taipei) Lee Y (Chinese Taipei) Hsieh P-c	13	15
(Thailand) B Issara (Thailand) S Amitrapai	21	21
PFQ	(Switzerland) P Deschenaux (Switzerland) T Girona	9	10
(France) B Kersaudy (France) L Palermo	21	21

Second Round
PFQ	(Switzerland) A Dumartheray (Switzerland) S Jaquet	20	10
(England) M Nottingham (England) E Westwood	22	21
(Thailand) B Issara (Thailand) S Amitrapai	21	21
(France) B Kersaudy (France) L Palermo	16	13

Quarterfinals
(England) M Nottingham (England) E Westwood	15	13
(Thailand) B Issara (Thailand) S Amitrapai	21	21

==== Section 2 ====
First Round
3	(China) Xu C (China) Ma J	19	21	21
(Japan) K Kazuno (Japan) A Kurihara	21	19	12
(Indonesia) R Alexander (Indonesia) M D Oktaviani	21	14
(France) G Mittelheisser (France) A Fontaine	23	21
8	(Indonesia) E Subaktiar (Indonesia) G E Widjaja	21	21
PFQ	(Germany) J Pistorius (Germany) R Janssens	15	15
(Chinese Taipei) Liao M-c (Chinese Taipei) Chen H-h	21	21
Q4	(Switzerland) K Schaffluetzel (Switzerland) S Angehrn	4	5

Second Round
3	(China) Xu C (China) Ma J	21	15	17
(France) G Mittelheisser (France) A Fontaine	7	21	21
8	(Indonesia) E Subaktiar (Indonesia) G E Widjaja	24	21	19
(Chinese Taipei) Liao M-c (Chinese Taipei) Chen H-h	26	14	21

Quarterfinals
(France) G Mittelheisser (France) A Fontaine	23	18	17
(Chinese Taipei) Liao M-c (Chinese Taipei) Chen H-h	21	21	21

=== Bottom half ===
==== Section 3 ====
First Round
(Denmark) M Christiansen (Denmark) L Grebak	13	15
(Japan) K Sonoda (Japan) N Fukuman	21	21
(Republic of Ireland) S Magee (Republic of Ireland) C Magee	21	21
PFQ	(Germany) P Kaesbauer (Germany) F Volkmann	12	7
Q2	(Germany) F Holzer (Germany) B Bellenberg	8	11
(Germany) M Lamsfuss (Germany) I Herttrich	21	21
(Chinese Taipei) Lee J-h (Chinese Taipei) Wu T-j	21	21
PFQ	(Germany) R Domke (Germany) L Kaepplein	16	13

Second Round
(Japan) K Sonoda (Japan) N Fukuman	20	21	21
(Republic of Ireland) S Magee (Republic of Ireland) C Magee	22	18	16
(Germany) M Lamsfuss (Germany) I Herttrich	20	21	21
(Chinese Taipei) Lee J-h (Chinese Taipei) Wu T-j	22	15	19

Quarterfinals
(Japan) K Sonoda (Japan) N Fukuman	21	21
(Germany) M Lamsfuss (Germany) I Herttrich	16	14

==== Section 4 ====
First Round
Q3	(Sweden) J Nordh (Sweden) C Nistad	5	5
PFQ	(Germany) R Beck (Germany) J Karnott	21	21
(China) Wang YY (China) Chen QC	21	21
7	(Netherlands) J Arends (Netherlands) S Piek	17	11
PFQ	(Switzerland) O Schaller (Switzerland) C Burkart	9	12
(Thailand) D Puavaranukroh (Thailand) S Taerattanachai	21	21
(Germany) M E Seidel (Germany) L Efler	11	16
2	(China) Liu C (China) Bao YX	21	21

Second Round
PFQ	(Germany) R Beck (Germany) J Karnott	3	11
(China) Wang YY (China) Chen QC	21	21
(Thailand) D Puavaranukroh (Thailand) S Taerattanachai	23	14	21
2	(China) Liu C (China) Bao YX	21	21	17

Quarterfinals
(China) Wang YY (China) Chen QC	19	21	21
(Thailand) D Puavaranukroh (Thailand) S Taerattanachai	21	11	15

Preceded by 2016 German Open Grand Prix Gold	BWF Grand Prix and Grand Prix Gold; 2016 BWF Season	Succeeded by 2016 New Zealand Open Grand Prix Gold
