= Badminton at the 2013 SEA Games – Women's doubles =

These are the results of the Women's doubles competition in badminton at the 2013 SEA Games in Myanmar.

== Medal winners ==
| (gold) Gold | (silver) Silver | (bronze) Bronze |
|---|---|---|
| (Malaysia) Vivian Hoo (Malaysia) Woon Khe Wei | (Indonesia) Nitya Krishinda Maheswari (Indonesia) Greysia Polii | (Singapore) Shinta Mulia Sari (Singapore) Yao Lei (Thailand) Puttita Supajirakul (Thailand) Sapsiree Taerattanachai |

== Draw ==
First round
1 | (Indonesia) Nitya Krishinda Maheswari (Indonesia) Greysia Polii
Bye
(Myanmar) Chaw Ei Ei (Myanmar) Yee Le Le | 6 | 8
(Vietnam) Lê Thu Huyền (Vietnam) Phạm Như Thảo | 21 | 21
(Singapore) Fu Mingtian (Singapore) Vanessa Neo | 15 | 15
(Thailand) Sapsiree Taerattanachai (Thailand) Puttita Supajirakul | 21 | 21
(Laos) Bouphakesone Lomany (Laos) Phonephan Vatthanavong | 13 | 14
(Malaysia) Lim Yin Loo (Malaysia) Lee Meng Yean | 21 | 21
(Thailand) Savitree Amitrapai (Thailand) Narissapat Lam | 10 | 15
(Malaysia) Vivian Hoo (Malaysia) Woon Khe Wei | 21 | 21
(Laos) Manivone Merngchalern (Laos) Phetmany Keophiachanh | 17 | 15
(Myanmar) Ya Htoo Htoo (Myanmar) Mon Kyu Hlaing | 21 | 21
(Vietnam) Nguyễn Thị Sen (Vietnam) Vũ Thị Trang | 15 | 14
(Indonesia) Gebby Ristiyani Imawan (Indonesia) Tiara Rosalia Nuraidah | 21 | 21
Bye
2 | (Singapore) Shinta Mulia Sari (Singapore) Yao Lei

Quarterfintaals
1 | (Indonesia) Nitya Krishinda Maheswari (Indonesia) Greysia Polii | 21 | 21
(Vietnam) Lê Thu Huyền (Vietnam) Phạm Như Thảo | 15 | 11
(Thailand) Sapsiree Taerattanachai (Thailand) Puttita Supajirakul | 21 | 20 | 21
(Malaysia) Lim Yin Loo (Malaysia) Lee Meng Yean | 10 | 22 | 14
(Malaysia) Vivian Hoo (Malaysia) Woon Khe Wei | 21 | 21
(Myanmar) Ya Htoo Htoo (Myanmar) Mon Kyu Hlaing | 8 | 8
(Indonesia) Gebby Ristiyani Imawan (Indonesia) Tiara Rosalia Nuraidah | 16 | 22 | 24
2 | (Singapore) Shinta Mulia Sari (Singapore) Yao Lei | 21 | 20 | 26

Semifinals
1 | (Indonesia) Nitya Krishinda Maheswari (Indonesia) Greysia Polii | 21 | 21
(Thailand) Sapsiree Taerattanachai (Thailand) Puttita Supajirakul | 7 | 11
(Malaysia) Vivian Hoo (Malaysia) Woon Khe Wei | 23 | 17 | 21
2 | (Singapore) Shinta Mulia Sari (Singapore) Yao Lei | 21 | 21 | 17

Finals
1 | (Indonesia) Nitya Krishinda Maheswari (Indonesia) Greysia Polii | 17 | 21 | 17
(Malaysia) Vivian Hoo (Malaysia) Woon Khe Wei | 21 | 18 | 21
