= 2015 BWF World Championships =

Tournament details
- Dates: 10–16 August
- Edition: 22nd
- Level: International
- Venue: Istora Senayan
- Location: Jakarta, Indonesia

The 2015 BWF World Championships was a badminton tournament which was held from 10 to 16 August 2015 in Jakarta, Indonesia.

== Host city selection ==
Jakarta and Kunshan submitted bids to host the championships. Jakarta was awarded the right to host the event by Badminton World Federation after reportedly winning by 1 vote difference.

== Draw ==
The draw was held on 28 July 2015 at 11:00 local time at the Museum Bank Indonesia in Jakarta, Indonesia.

== Schedule ==
All five events started on the first day and concluded with the final on the last day.

All times are local (UTC+7).

Date	Time	Round
10 August 2015	09:00	Round of 64
10 August 2015	09:00	Round of 48
11 August 2015	09:00	Round of 64
11 August 2015	09:00	Round of 32
11 August 2015	09:00	Round of 48
12 August 2015	09:00	Round of 32
13 August 2015	11:00	Round of 16
14 August 2015	11:00	Quarterfinals
15 August 2015	11:00	Semifinals
16 August 2015	13:00	Finals

== Medalists ==
Event	Gold	Silver	Bronze
Men's singles	Chen Long; China	Lee Chong Wei; Malaysia	Kento Momota; Japan
Men's singles	Chen Long; China	Lee Chong Wei; Malaysia	Jan Ø. Jørgensen; Denmark
Women's singles	Carolina Marín; Spain	Saina Nehwal; India	Sung Ji-hyun; South Korea
Women's singles	Carolina Marín; Spain	Saina Nehwal; India	Lindaweni Fanetri; Indonesia
Men's doubles	Indonesia; Mohammad Ahsan; Hendra Setiawan	China; Liu Xiaolong; Qiu Zihan	South Korea; Lee Yong-dae; Yoo Yeon-seong
Men's doubles	Indonesia; Mohammad Ahsan; Hendra Setiawan	China; Liu Xiaolong; Qiu Zihan	Japan; Hiroyuki Endo; Kenichi Hayakawa
Women's doubles	China; Tian Qing; Zhao Yunlei	Denmark; Christinna Pedersen; Kamilla Rytter Juhl	Indonesia; Nitya Krishinda Maheswari; Greysia Polii
Women's doubles	China; Tian Qing; Zhao Yunlei	Denmark; Christinna Pedersen; Kamilla Rytter Juhl	Japan; Naoko Fukuman; Kurumi Yonao
Mixed doubles	China; Zhang Nan; Zhao Yunlei	China; Liu Cheng; Bao Yixin	Indonesia; Tontowi Ahmad; Liliyana Natsir
Mixed doubles	China; Zhang Nan; Zhao Yunlei	China; Liu Cheng; Bao Yixin	China; Xu Chen; Ma Jin

== Medal table ==
* Host nation (Indonesia)

Rank	Nation	Gold	Silver	Bronze	Total
1	China (CHN)	3	2	1	6
2	Indonesia (INA)*	1	0	3	4
3	Spain (ESP)	1	0	0	1
4	Denmark (DEN)	0	1	1	2
5	India (IND)	0	1	0	1
5	Malaysia (MAS)	0	1	0	1
7	Japan (JPN)	0	0	3	3
8	South Korea (KOR)	0	0	2	2
Totals (8 entries)		5	5	10	20
