= Naoko Fukuman =

Japanese badminton player

Naoko Fukuman 福万尚子
Personal information
- Born: 3 March 1992 (age 34) Osaka, Osaka Prefecture, Japan
- Height: 1.57 m (5 ft 2 in)

Sport
- Country: Japan
- Sport: Badminton
- Handedness: Right

Women's & mixed doubles
- Highest ranking: 7 (WD 23 March 2017); 19 (XD 31 March 2016)
- Current ranking: 15 (WD 8 January 2019)
- BWF profile
Medal record
Women's badminton
Representing Japan
World Championships
Bronze medal – third place	2015 Jakarta	Women's doubles
Sudirman Cup
Silver medal – second place	2015 Dongguan	Mixed team
Uber Cup
Bronze medal – third place	2016 Kunshan	Women's team
Asian Championships
Silver medal – second place	2016 Wuhan	Women's doubles
Asia Team Championships
Silver medal – second place	2016 Hyderabad	Women's team
East Asian Games
Bronze medal – third place	2013 Tianjin	Women's team
World Junior Championships
Bronze medal – third place	2010 Guadalajara	Girls' singles
Asian Junior Championships
Bronze medal – third place	2009 Kuala Lumpur	Mixed team

Naoko Fukuman (福万尚子, Fukuman Naoko; born 3 March 1992) is a Japanese badminton player.

== Career ==
In 2009 and 2010 she became the semifinalist of the Osaka International tournament in women's doubles event. In 2010, she became the runner-up of the Austrian International tournament partnered with Minatsu Mitani. She also became the semifinalist at the Russian Open tournament in women's singles and doubles event. In 2011, she became the semifinalist at the New Zealand International Challenge tournament in women's doubles event partnered with Kurumi Yonao, then in November, they won Malaysia International tournament after beat Lim Yin Loo and Marylen Ng of Malaysia in straight games 21-16, 21-13.

In 2012, she became the runner-up of the Osaka International tournament in women's doubles event partnered with Kurumi Yonao after defeated by their compatriot Rie Eto and Yu Wakita with the score 21-18, 21-12. They also won Maldives and Scottish International tournaments. At Scotland, they beat Koharu Yonemoto and Yuriko Miki with the score 23-21, 21-18.

In 2014, she won the Singapore and USA International tournaments. At Singapore, they defeat Pacharapun Chochuwong and Chanisa Teachavorasinskun of Thailand with the score 21-16, 21–11; and at United States, they beat Eva Lee and Paula Lynn Obañana of United States with the score 21-10, 25-23.

In 2015, she became the runner-up of the Malaysia Masters Grand Prix Gold tournament in women's doubles event after defeated by the Danish pair Christinna Pedersen and Kamilla Rytter Juhl in straight games 21–14, 21–14. She also won the bronze medal at the 2015 BWF World Championships in women's doubles event after defeated by Perdersen and Juhl in semifinal round with the score 21-12, 21-15. She and Yonao also the semifinalist of the 2015 U.S. Open Grand Prix Gold and Hong Kong Super Series tournaments.

In 2016, she won the silver medal at the Badminton Asia Championships in women's doubles event with Yonao. They went through the final after creating a new record of the longest badminton match in two hours and forty-one minutes in the semifinal match against Greysia Polii and Nitya Krishinda Maheswari of Indonesia. In the final match, they were defeated by their teammate, Misaki Matsutomo and Ayaka Takahashi, with the score of 21–13, 21–15. She also became the runner-up of the 2016 Swiss Open Grand Prix Gold and India Super Series tournaments in women's doubles event.

In 2019, she intended to retire from the national tournament in the end of 2019 season. The farewell hold alongside the others players at the 2019 S/J League on 20 December. Fukuman will join the Synergy Badminton Academy in the United States as a head coach and for a while, she will be pairing with athletes at the academy to compete in international competitions.

== Achievements ==
=== World Championships ===
Women's doubles
Year	Venue	Partner	Opponent	Score	Result	Ref.
2015	Istora Senayan; Jakarta, Indonesia	(Japan) Kurumi Yonao	(Denmark) Christinna Pedersen (Denmark) Kamilla Rytter Juhl	12–21, 15–21	Bronze	

=== Asian Championships ===
Women's doubles
Year	Venue	Partner	Opponent	Score	Result	Ref.
2016	Wuhan Sports Center Gymnasium; Wuhan, China	(Japan) Kurumi Yonao	(Japan) Misaki Matsutomo (Japan) Ayaka Takahashi	13–21, 15–21	Silver	

=== World Junior Championships ===
Girls' singles
Year	enue	Opponent	Score	Result
2010	Domo del Code Jalisco, Guadalajara, Mexico	(Thailand) Ratchanok Intanon	9–21, 16–21	Bronze

=== BWF Superseries ===
The BWF Superseries, which was launched on 14 December 2006 and implemented in 2007, was a series of elite badminton tournaments, sanctioned by the Badminton World Federation (BWF). BWF Superseries levels were Superseries and Superseries Premier. A season of Superseries consisted of twelve tournaments around the world that had been introduced since 2011. Successful players were invited to the Superseries Finals, which were held at the end of each year.

Women's doubles
Year	Tournament	Partner	Opponent	Score	Result	Ref.
2016	India Open	(Japan) Kurumi Yonao	(Japan) Misaki Matsutomo (Japan) Ayaka Takahashi	18–21, 18–21	(silver) Runner-up	
2017	India Open	(Japan) Kurumi Yonao	(Japan) Shiho Tanaka (Japan) Koharu Yonemoto	21–16, 19–21, 10–21	(silver) Runner-up	

BWF Super Series Finals tournament
BWF Super Series Premier tournament
BWF Super Series tournament

=== BWF Grand Prix ===
The BWF Grand Prix had two levels, the Grand Prix and Grand Prix Gold. It was a series of badminton tournaments sanctioned by the Badminton World Federation (BWF) and played between 2007 and 2017.

Women's doubles
Year	Tournament	Partner	Opponent	Score	Result	Ref.
2015	Malaysia Masters	(Japan) Kurumi Yonao	(Denmark) Christinna Pedersen (Denmark) Kamilla Rytter Juhl	14–21, 14–21	(silver) Runner-up	
2016	Swiss Open	(Japan) Kurumi Yonao	(Japan) Shizuka Matsuo (Japan) Mami Naito	16–21, 21–12, 12–21	(silver) Runner-up	

BWF Grand Prix Gold tournament
BWF Grand Prix tournament

=== BWF International Challenge/Series ===
Women's doubles
Year	Tournament	Partner	Opponent	Score	Result	Ref.
2010	Austrian International	(Japan) Minatsu Mitani	(Japan) Rie Eto (Japan) Yu Wakita	14–21, 10–21	(silver) Runner-up	
2011	Malaysia International	(Japan) Kurumi Yonao	(Malaysia) Lim Yin Loo (Malaysia) Marylen Ng	21–16, 21–13	(gold) Winner	
2012	Osaka International	(Japan) Kurumi Yonao	(Japan) Rie Eto (Japan) Yu Wakita	18–21, 12–21	(silver) Runner-up	
2012	Maldives International	(Japan) Kurumi Yonao	(Japan) Rie Eto (Japan) Yu Wakita	21–18, 13–21, 23–21	(gold) Winner	
2012	Scottish International	(Japan) Kurumi Yonao	(Japan) Koharu Yonemoto (Japan) Yuriko Miki	23–21, 21–18	(gold) Winner	
2014	Singapore International	(Japan) Kurumi Yonao	(Thailand) Pacharapun Chochuwong (Thailand) Chanisa Teachavorasinskun	21–16, 21–11	(gold) Winner	
2014	USA International	(Japan) Kurumi Yonao	(United States) Eva Lee (United States) Paula Lynn Obañana	21–10, 25–23	(gold) Winner	
2018	Osaka International	(Japan) Kurumi Yonao	(Japan) Ayako Sakuramoto (Japan) Yukiko Takahata	17–21, 21–19, 21–16	(gold) Winner	

BWF International Challenge tournament
BWF International Series tournament
