= Kurumi Yonao =

Japanese badminton player

Personal information
- Born: 1 December 1992 (age 33) Toyoake, Aichi, Japan
- Height: 1.67 m (5 ft 6 in)

Sport
- Country: Japan
- Sport: Badminton
- Handedness: Right
- Retired: 28 February 2021

Women's singles and doubles
- Highest ranking: 192 (WS, 14 March 2013); 7 (WD with Naoko Fukuman, 23 March 2017)
- BWF profile
Medal record
Women's badminton
Representing Japan
World Championships
Bronze medal – third place	2015 Jakarta	Women's doubles
Sudirman Cup
Silver medal – second place	2015 Dongguan	Mixed team
Uber Cup
Bronze medal – third place	2016 Kunshan	Women's team
Asian Championships
Silver medal – second place	2016 Wuhan	Women's doubles
Asia Team Championships
Silver medal – second place	2016 Hyderabad	Women's team
East Asian Games
Bronze medal – third place	2013 Tianjin	Women's team

Kurumi Yonao (與猶くるみ, Yonao Kurumi; born 1 December 1992) is a Japanese badminton player. She won a bronze medal in 2015 BWF World Championships in Jakarta with Naoko Fukuman.

== Achievements ==
=== World Championships ===
Women's doubles
Year	Venue	Partner	Opponent	Score	Result	Ref.
2015	Istora Senayan; Jakarta, Indonesia	(Japan) Naoko Fukuman	(Denmark) Christinna Pedersen (Denmark) Kamilla Rytter Juhl	12–21, 15–21	Bronze	

=== Asian Championships ===
Women's doubles
Year	Venue	Partner	Opponent	Score	Result	Ref.
2016	Wuhan Sports Center Gymnasium; Wuhan, China	(Japan) Naoko Fukuman	(Japan) Misaki Matsutomo (Japan) Ayaka Takahashi	13–21, 15–21	Silver	

=== BWF Superseries ===
The BWF Superseries, which was launched on 14 December 2006 and implemented in 2007, was a series of elite badminton tournaments, sanctioned by the Badminton World Federation (BWF). BWF Superseries levels were Superseries and Superseries Premier. A season of Superseries consisted of twelve tournaments around the world that had been introduced since 2011. Successful players were invited to the Superseries Finals, which were held at the end of each year.

Women's doubles
Year	Tournament	Partner	Opponent	Score	Result	Ref.
2016	India Open	(Japan) Naoko Fukuman	(Japan) Misaki Matsutomo (Japan) Ayaka Takahashi	18–21, 18–21	(silver) Runner-up	
2017	India Open	(Japan) Naoko Fukuman	(Japan) Shiho Tanaka (Japan) Koharu Yonemoto	21–16, 19–21, 10–21	(silver) Runner-up	

BWF Super Series tournament

=== BWF Grand Prix ===
The BWF Grand Prix had two levels, the Grand Prix and Grand Prix Gold. It was a series of badminton tournaments sanctioned by the Badminton World Federation (BWF) and played between 2007 and 2017.

Women's doubles
Year	Tournament	Partner	Opponent	Score	Result	Ref.
2015	Malaysia Masters	(Japan) Naoko Fukuman	(Denmark) Christinna Pedersen (Denmark) Kamilla Rytter Juhl	14–21, 14–21	(silver) Runner-up	
2016	Swiss Open	(Japan) Naoko Fukuman	(Japan) Shizuka Matsuo (Japan) Mami Naito	16–21, 21–12, 12–21	(silver) Runner-up	

BWF Grand Prix Gold tournament

=== BWF International Challenge/Series ===
Women's doubles
Year	Tournament	Partner	Opponent	Score	Result	Ref.
2011	Malaysia International	(Japan) Naoko Fukuman	(Malaysia) Lim Yin Loo (Malaysia) Marylen Ng	21–16, 21–13	(gold) Winner	
2012	Osaka International	(Japan) Naoko Fukuman	(Japan) Rie Eto (Japan) Yu Wakita	18–21, 12–21	(silver) Runner-up	
2012	Maldives International	(Japan) Naoko Fukuman	(Japan) Rie Eto (Japan) Yu Wakita	21–18, 13–21, 23–21	(gold) Winner	
2012	Scottish International	(Japan) Naoko Fukuman	(Japan) Koharu Yonemoto (Japan) Yuriko Miki	23–21, 21–18	(gold) Winner	
2014	Singapore International	(Japan) Naoko Fukuman	(Thailand) Pacharapun Chochuwong (Thailand) Chanisa Teachavorasinskun	21–16, 21–11	(gold) Winner	
2014	USA International	(Japan) Naoko Fukuman	(United States) Eva Lee (United States) Paula Lynn Obañana	21–10, 25–23	(gold) Winner	
2018	Osaka International	(Japan) Naoko Fukuman	(Japan) Ayako Sakuramoto (Japan) Yukiko Takahata	17–21, 21–19, 21–16	(gold) Winner	

BWF International Challenge tournament
BWF International Series tournament
