= Mami Naito =

Japanese badminton player (born 1986)

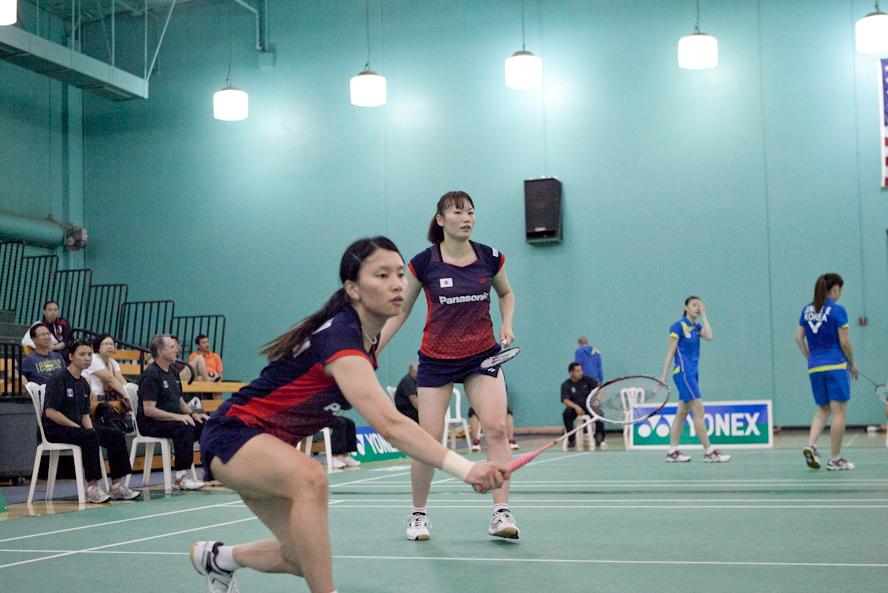

Personal information
- Born: 内藤 真実; 25 December 1986 (age 39) Kanagawa Prefecture, Japan
- Height: 1.72 m (5 ft 8 in)
- Weight: 67 kg (148 lb)
- Spouse: Yoshinori Takeuchi (m. 2018)

Sport
- Country: Japan
- Sport: Badminton
- Handedness: Left

Women's & mixed doubles
- Highest ranking: 3 (WD 25 April 2013); 86 (XD 22 October 2009)
- BWF profile
Medal record
Women's badminton
Representing Japan
Sudirman Cup
| Silver medal – second place | 2015 Dongguan | Mixed team |
Uber Cup
| Silver medal – second place | 2014 New Delhi | Women's team |
| Bronze medal – third place | 2010 Kuala Lumpur | Women's team |
| Bronze medal – third place | 2012 Wuhan | Women's team |
| Bronze medal – third place | 2016 Kunshan | Women's team |
Asian Games
| Bronze medal – third place | 2014 Incheon | Women's team |
Asian Championships
| Bronze medal – third place | 2012 Qingdao | Women's doubles |
Asia Team Championships
| Silver medal – second place | 2016 Hyderabad | Women's team |

Mami Naito (内藤 真実, Naitō Mami; born 25 December 1986) is a Japanese badminton player from the Yonex team, who competed at the 2014 Asian Games. She educated physical education at the Nippon Sport Science University, Tokyo. Her older brother, Yusuke Naito is a badminton coach. Naito and her women's doubles partner Shizuka Matsuo have reached the career high as world number 3 in the BWF World ranking.

== Achievements ==
=== Asian Championships ===
Women's doubles
| Year | Venue | Partner | Opponent | Score | Result |
|---|---|---|---|---|---|
| 2012 | Qingdao Sports Centre Conson Stadium, Qingdao, China | (Japan) Shizuka Matsuo | (China) Bao Yixin (China) Zhong Qianxin | 16–21, 19–21 | Bronze |

=== BWF Superseries ===
The BWF Superseries, which was launched on 14 December 2006 and implemented in 2007, is a series of elite badminton tournaments, sanctioned by the Badminton World Federation (BWF). BWF Superseries levels are Superseries and Superseries Premier. A season of Superseries consists of twelve tournaments around the world that have been introduced since 2011. Successful players are invited to the Superseries Finals, which are held at the end of each year.

Women's doubles
| Year | Tournament | Partner | Opponent | Score | Result | Ref. |
|---|---|---|---|---|---|---|
| 2010 | Denmark Open | (Japan) Shizuka Matsuo | (Japan) Miyuki Maeda (Japan) Satoko Suetsuna | 17–21, 14–21 | (silver) Runner-up | |
| 2012 | Japan Open | (Japan) Shizuka Matsuo | (Hong Kong) Poon Lok Yan (Hong Kong) Tse Ying Suet | 17–21, 20–22 | (silver) Runner-up | |

BWF Super Series tournament

=== BWF Grand Prix ===
The BWF Grand Prix had two levels, the BWF Grand Prix and Grand Prix Gold. It was a series of badminton tournaments sanctioned by the Badminton World Federation (BWF) which was held from 2007 to 2017.

Women's doubles
| Year | Tournament | Partner | Opponent | Score | Result | Ref. |
|---|---|---|---|---|---|---|
| 2011 | Australian Open | (Japan) Shizuka Matsuo | (Malaysia) Chin Eei Hui (Malaysia) Wong Pei Tty | 21–18, 21–11 | (gold) Winner | |
| 2011 | Malaysia Grand Prix Gold | (Japan) Shizuka Matsuo | (Japan) Miyuki Maeda (Japan) Satoko Suetsuna | 18–21, 13–21 | (silver) Runner-up | |
| 2014 | New Zealand Open | (Japan) Shizuka Matsuo | (Australia) Tang Hetian (Australia) Renuga Veeran | 13–21, 21–10, 18–21 | (silver) Runner-up | |
| 2015 | Mexico City Grand Prix | (Japan) Shizuka Matsuo | (Thailand) Puttita Supajirakul (Thailand) Sapsiree Taerattanachai | 21–17, 16–21, 21–10 | (gold) Winner | |
| 2016 | Swiss Open | (Japan) Shizuka Matsuo | (Japan) Naoko Fukuman (Japan) Kurumi Yonao | 21–16, 12–21, 21–12 | (gold) Winner | |

BWF Grand Prix Gold tournament
BWF Grand Prix tournament

=== BWF International Challenge/Series ===
Women's doubles
| Year | Tournament | Partner | Opponent | Score | Result | Ref. |
|---|---|---|---|---|---|---|
| 2009 | Austrian International | (Japan) Shizuka Matsuo | (Japan) Mizuki Fujii (Japan) Reika Kakiiwa | 21–15, 21–18 | (gold) Winner | |
| 2014 | Osaka International | (Japan) Shizuka Matsuo | (Japan) Asumi Kugo (Japan) Yui Miyauchi | 24–22, 21–6 | (gold) Winner | |

BWF International Challenge tournament

== Record against selected opponents ==
Record against year-end Finals finalists, World Championships semi-finalists, and Olympic quarter-finalists.

=== Shizuka Matsuo ===
- (Australia) Leanne Choo / Renuga Veeran 1–0
- (Bulgaria) / (Russia) Petya Nedelcheva / Anastasia Russkikh 2–1
- (Canada) Alex Bruce / Michelle Li 1–0
- (China) Cheng Shu / Zhao Yunlei 0–1
- (China) Du Jing / Yu Yang 0–2
- (China) Pan Pan / Zhang Yawen 0–1
- (China) Tian Qing / Zhao Yunlei 1–7
- (China) Wang Xiaoli / Yu Yang 0–7
- (China) Xia Huan / Tang Jinhua 0–1
- (China) Bao Yixin / Zhong Qianxin 0–5
- (China) Bao Yixin / Tang Jinhua 0–1
- (China) Luo Ying / Luo Yu 2–2
- (Chinese Taipei) Cheng Wen-hsing / Chien Yu-chin 2–3
- (Denmark) Christinna Pedersen / Kamilla Rytter Juhl 2–2
- (Hong Kong) Poon Lok Yan / Tse Ying Suet 3–2
- (India) Jwala Gutta / Ashwini Ponnappa 2–0
- (Indonesia) Nitya Krishinda Maheswari / Greysia Polii 0–6
- (Indonesia) Vita Marissa / Nadya Melati 1–0
- (Japan) Mizuki Fujii / Reika Kakiiwa 3–4
- (Japan) Miyuki Maeda / Satoko Suetsuna 1–2
- (Japan) Misaki Matsutomo / Ayaka Takahashi 3–2
- (Japan) Reika Kakiiwa / Miyuki Maeda 1–0
- (South Korea) Ha Jung-eun / Kim Min-jung 0–6
- (South Korea) Jung Kyung-eun / Kim Ha-na 2–3
- (Malaysia) Chin Eei Hui / Wong Pei Tty 1–0
- (Russia) Valeria Sorokina / Nina Vislova 2–1
- (Singapore) Shinta Mulia Sari / Yao Lei 1–0
- (Thailand) Duanganong Aroonkesorn / Kunchala Voravichitchaikul 4–0
