= Shizuka Matsuo =

Japanese badminton player (born 1986)

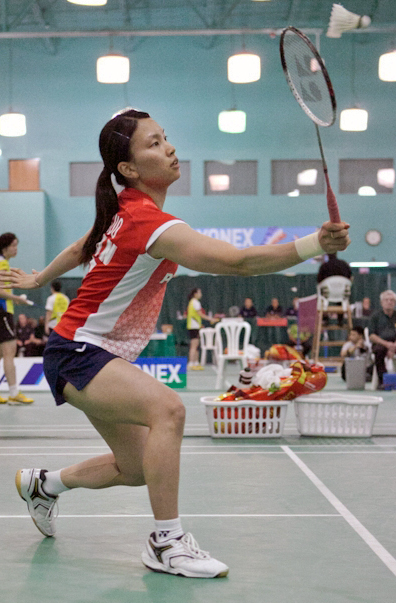

Personal information
- Born: 松尾 静香; 24 November 1986 (age 39) Osaka Prefecture, Japan
- Height: 1.57 m (5 ft 2 in)
- Weight: 54 kg (119 lb)

Sport
- Country: Japan
- Sport: Badminton
- Handedness: Right

Women's & mixed doubles
- Highest ranking: 3 (WD 25 April 2013); 13 (XD 20 September 2012)
- BWF profile
Medal record
Women's badminton
Representing Japan
Uber Cup
Silver medal – second place	2014 New Delhi	Women's team
Bronze medal – third place	2010 Kuala Lumpur	Women's team
Bronze medal – third place	2012 Wuhan	Women's team
Bronze medal – third place	2016 Kunshan	Women's team
Asian Games
Bronze medal – third place	2014 Incheon	Women's team
Asian Championships
Bronze medal – third place	2012 Qingdao	Women's doubles
Asia Team Championships
Silver medal – second place	2016 Hyderabad	Women's team

Shizuka Matsuo (松尾 静香, Matsuo Shizuka; born 24 November 1986) is a Japanese badminton player. Born in Osaka, Matsuo once affiliated with Sanyo Electric and Panasonic badminton team, and after that joined the NTT East team in 2013. She currently works as a doubles coach in NTT East. Matsuo was a part of the Japanese women's bronze medalist team at the 2014 Asian Games.

== Achievements ==
=== Asian Championships ===
Women's doubles
Year	Venue	Partner	Opponent	Score	Result	Ref.
2012	Qingdao Sports Centre Conson Stadium, Qingdao, China	(Japan) Mami Naito	(China) Bao Yixin (China) Zhong Qianxin	16–21, 19–21	Bronze	

=== BWF Superseries ===
The BWF Superseries, which was launched on 14 December 2006 and implemented in 2007, is a series of elite badminton tournaments, sanctioned by the Badminton World Federation (BWF). BWF Superseries levels are Superseries and Superseries Premier. A season of Superseries consists of twelve tournaments around the world that have been introduced since 2011. Successful players are invited to the Superseries Finals, which are held at the end of each year.

Women's doubles
Year	Tournament	Partner	Opponent	Score	Result	Ref.
2010	Denmark Open	(Japan) Mami Naito	(Japan) Miyuki Maeda (Japan) Satoko Suetsuna	17–21, 14–21	(silver) Runner-up	
2012	Japan Open	(Japan) Mami Naito	(Hong Kong) Poon Lok Yan (Hong Kong) Tse Ying Suet	17–21, 20–22	(silver) Runner-up	

BWF Super Series tournament

=== BWF Grand Prix ===
The BWF Grand Prix had two levels, the BWF Grand Prix and Grand Prix Gold. It was a series of badminton tournaments sanctioned by the Badminton World Federation (BWF) which was held from 2007 to 2017.

Women's doubles
Year	Tournament	Partner	Opponent	Score	Result	Ref.
2011	Australian Open	(Japan) Mami Naito	(Malaysia) Chin Eei Hui (Malaysia) Wong Pei Tty	21–18, 21–11	(gold) Winner	
2011	Malaysia Grand Prix Gold	(Japan) Mami Naito	(Japan) Miyuki Maeda (Japan) Satoko Suetsuna	18–21, 13–21	(silver) Runner-up	
2014	New Zealand Open	(Japan) Mami Naito	(Australia) Tang Hetian (Australia) Renuga Veeran	13–21, 21–10, 18–21	(silver) Runner-up	
2015	Mexico City Grand Prix	(Japan) Mami Naito	(Thailand) Puttita Supajirakul (Thailand) Sapsiree Taerattanachai	21–17, 16–21, 21–10	(gold) Winner	
2016	Swiss Open	(Japan) Mami Naito	(Japan) Naoko Fukuman (Japan) Kurumi Yonao	21–16, 12–21, 21–12	(gold) Winner	

BWF Grand Prix Gold tournament
BWF Grand Prix tournament

=== BWF International Challenge/Series ===
Women's doubles
Year	Tournament	Partner	Opponent	Score	Result	Ref.
2007	Indonesia International	(Japan) Yasuyo Imabeppu	(Indonesia) Shendy Puspa Irawati (Indonesia) Meiliana Jauhari	21–15, 15–21, 17–21	(silver) Runner-up	
2008	Australian International	(Japan) Yasuyo Imabeppu	(Chinese Taipei) Hsieh Pei-chen (Chinese Taipei) Lee Tai-an	21–17, 21–10	(gold) Winner	
2009	Austrian International	(Japan) Mami Naito	(Japan) Mizuki Fujii (Japan) Reika Kakiiwa	21–15, 21–18	(gold) Winner	
2014	Osaka International	(Japan) Mami Naito	(Japan) Kugo Asumi (Japan) Yui Miyauchi	24–22, 21–6	(gold) Winner	

Mixed doubles
Year	Tournament	Partner	Opponent	Score	Result	Ref.
2008	Osaka International	(Japan) Noriyasu Hirata	(South Korea) Kwon Yi-goo (South Korea) Ha Jung-eun	22–24, 13–21	(silver) Runner-up	
2008	Australian International	(Japan) Noriyasu Hirata	(Chinese Taipei) Chen Hung-ling (Chinese Taipei) Chou Chia-chi	16–21, 4–21	(silver) Runner-up	
2009	Osaka International	(Japan) Noriyasu Hirata	(Chinese Taipei) Hsieh Yu-hsing (Chinese Taipei) Chien Yu-chin	18–21, 15–21	(silver) Runner-up	
2010	Osaka International	(Japan) Kenichi Hayakawa	(Japan) Hirokatsu Hashimoto (Japan) Mizuki Fujii	21–14, 21–11	(gold) Winner	

BWF International Challenge tournament

== Record against selected opponents ==
Record against year-end Finals finalists, World Championships semi-finalists, and Olympic quarter-finalists.

=== Mami Naito ===
Players	M	W	L	Diff.
(Australia) Leanne Choo & Renuga Veeran	1	1	0	+1
(Bulgaria) / (Russia) Petya Nedelcheva & Anastasia Russkikh	3	2	1	+1
(Canada) Alex Bruce & Michelle Li	1	1	0	+1
(China) Cheng Shu & Zhao Yunlei	1	0	1	–1
(China) Du Jing & Yu Yang	2	0	2	–2
(China) Pan Pan & Zhang Yawen	1	0	1	–1
(China) Tian Qing & Zhao Yunlei	8	1	7	–6
(China) Wang Xiaoli & Yu Yang	7	0	7	–7
(China) Xia Huan & Tang Jinhua	1	0	1	–1
(China) Bao Yixin & Zhong Qianxin	5	0	5	–5
(China) Bao Yixin & Tang Jinhua	1	0	1	–1
(China) Luo Ying & Luo Yu	4	2	2	0
(Chinese Taipei) Cheng Wen-hsing & Chien Yu-chin	5	2	3	–1
(Denmark) Christinna Pedersen & Kamilla Rytter Juhl	4	2	2	0

Players	M	W	L	Diff.
(Hong Kong) Poon Lok Yan & Tse Ying Suet	5	3	2	+1
(India) Jwala Gutta & Ashwini Ponnappa	2	2	0	+2
(Indonesia) Vita Marissa & Nadya Melati	1	1	0	+1
(Japan) Mizuki Fujii & Reika Kakiiwa	7	3	4	–1
(Japan) Miyuki Maeda & Satoko Suetsuna	3	1	2	–1
(Japan) Misaki Matsutomo & Ayaka Takahashi	5	3	2	+1
(Japan) Reika Kakiiwa & Miyuki Maeda	1	1	0	+1
(South Korea) Ha Jung-eun & Kim Min-jung	6	0	6	–6
(South Korea) Jung Kyung-eun & Kim Ha-na	5	2	3	–1
(Malaysia) Chin Eei Hui & Wong Pei Tty	1	1	0	+1
(Russia) Valeria Sorokina & Nina Vislova	3	2	1	+1
(Singapore) Shinta Mulia Sari & Yao Lei	1	1	0	+1
(Thailand) Duanganong Aroonkesorn & Kunchala Voravichitchaikul	4	4	0	+4
