= 2011 BWF Grand Prix Gold and Grand Prix =

The 2011 BWF Grand Prix Gold and Grand Prix was the fifth season of BWF Grand Prix Gold and Grand Prix.

== Schedule ==
Below is the schedule released by Badminton World Federation:

Tour	Official title	Venue	City	Date		Report
Tour	Official title	Venue	City	Start	Finish	Report
1	(Germany) German Open Grand Prix Gold	RWE-Sporthalle	Mülheim	March 1	March 6	Report
2	(Switzerland) Swiss Open Grand Prix Gold	St. Jakobshalle	Basel	March 15	March 20	Report
3	(Australia) Australian Open Grand Prix Gold	Melbourne Sports and Aquatic Centre	Melbourne	April 5	April 10	Report
4	Malaysia Open Grand Prix Gold	Sultan Abdul Halim Stadium	Alor Setar	May 3	May 8	Report
5	Thailand Open Grand Prix Gold	CU Sport Complex	Bangkok	June 7	June 12	Report
6	Russia Open Grand Prix	Sports Hall Olympic	Vladivostok	June 28	July 3	Report
7	(United States) U.S. Open Grand Prix Gold	Orange County Badminton Club	Orange	July 11	July 16	Report
8	Canada Open Grand Prix	Richmond Oval	Richmond	July 19	July 24	Report
9	Vietnam Open Grand Prix	Phan Dinh Phung Stadium	Ho Chi Minh City	August 22	August 28	Report
10	Chinese Taipei Open Grand Prix Gold	Taipei County Shinjuang Stadium	Taipei	September 6	September 11	Report
11	Indonesia Masters Grand Prix Gold	GOR Bulutangkis Palaran	Samarinda	September 27	October 2	Report
12	(Netherlands) Dutch Open Grand Prix	Topsportcentrum	Almere	October 11	October 16	Report
13	(Germany) Bitburger Open Grand Prix Gold	Saarlandhalle	Saarbrücken	November 1	November 6	Report
14	Macau Open Grand Prix Gold	Cotai Arena	Macau	November 29	December 4	Report
15	(South Korea) Korea Grand Prix Gold	Hanium Culture Sports Center	Hwasun	December 6	December 11	Report
16	India Open Grand Prix Gold	Babu Banarasi Das Indoor Stadium	Lucknow	December 20	December 25	Report

Grand Prix Gold

== Results ==
=== Winners ===
Tour	Men's singles	Women's singles	Men's doubles	Women's doubles	Mixed doubles
Germany	(China) Lin Dan	(China) Liu Xin	(South Korea) Jung Jae-sung (South Korea) Lee Yong-dae	(Japan) Mizuki Fujii (Japan) Reika Kakiiwa	(Scotland) Robert Blair (England) Gabrielle White
Swiss	(South Korea) Park Sung-hwan	(India) Saina Nehwal	(South Korea) Ko Sung-hyun (South Korea) Yoo Yeon-seong	(South Korea) Ha Jung-eun (South Korea) Kim Min-jung	(Denmark) Joachim Fischer Nielsen (Denmark) Christinna Pedersen
Australia	(Japan) Sho Sasaki	(China) Liu Xin	(Japan) Hiroyuki Endo (Japan) Kenichi Hayakawa	(Japan) Shizuka Matsuo (Japan) Mami Naito	(Thailand) Songphon Anugritayawon (Thailand) Kunchala Voravichitchaikul
Malaysia	(Malaysia) Lee Chong Wei	(China) Wang Xin	(Malaysia) Koo Kien Keat (Malaysia) Tan Boon Heong	(Japan) Miyuki Maeda (Japan) Satoko Suetsuna	(Indonesia) Tontowi Ahmad (Indonesia) Liliyana Natsir
Thailand	(China) Chen Long	(China) Li Xuerui	(South Korea) Jung Jae-sung (South Korea) Lee Yong-dae	(China) Tian Qing (China) Zhao Yunlei	(Chinese Taipei) Lee Sheng-mu (Chinese Taipei) Chien Yu-chin
Russia	(China) Zhou Wenlong	(China) Lu Lan	(Japan) Naoki Kawamae (Japan) Shoji Sato	(Russia) Valeria Sorokina (Russia) Nina Vislova	(Russia) Alexandr Nikolaenko (Russia) Valeria Sorokina
U.S.	(Japan) Sho Sasaki	(Chinese Taipei) Tai Tzu-ying	(South Korea) Ko Sung-hyun (South Korea) Lee Yong-dae	(South Korea) Ha Jung-eun (South Korea) Kim Min-jung	(South Korea) Lee Yong-dae (South Korea) Ha Jung-eun
Canada	(Germany) Marc Zwiebler	(Chinese Taipei) Cheng Shao-chieh	(South Korea) Ko Sung-hyun (South Korea) Lee Yong-dae	(China) Cheng Shu (China) Bao Yixin	(Germany) Michael Fuchs (Germany) Birgit Michels
Vietnam	(Vietnam) Nguyen Tien Minh	(Singapore) Fu Mingtian	(Indonesia) Angga Pratama (Indonesia) Rian Agung Saputro	(Indonesia) Anneke Feinya Agustin (Indonesia) Nitya Krishinda Maheswari	(Russia) Vitalij Durkin (Russia) Nina Vislova
Chinese Taipei	(Indonesia) Tommy Sugiarto	(South Korea) Sung Ji-hyun	(South Korea) Ko Sung-hyun (South Korea) Yoo Yeon-seong	(South Korea) Ha Jung-eun (South Korea) Kim Min-jung	(South Korea) Ko Sung-hyun (South Korea) Eom Hye-won
Indonesia	(Indonesia) Dionysius Hayom Rumbaka	(China) Chen Xiaojia	(Indonesia) Mohammad Ahsan (Indonesia) Bona Septano	(Malaysia) Vivian Hoo Kah Mun (Malaysia) Woon Khe Wei	(China) He Hanbin (China) Bao Yixin
Netherlands	(Chinese Taipei) Hsueh Hsuan-yi	(Netherlands) Yao Jie	(Poland) Adam Cwalina (Poland) Michał Łogosz	(Thailand) Duanganong Aroonkesorn (Thailand) Kunchala Voravichitchaikul	(Thailand) Songphon Anugritayawon (Thailand) Kunchala Voravichitchaikul
Bitburger	(Denmark) Hans-Kristian Vittinghus	(China) Li Xuerui	(Thailand) Bodin Issara (Thailand) Maneepong Jongjit	(Japan) Mizuki Fujii (Japan) Reika Kakiiwa	(Malaysia) Chan Peng Soon (Malaysia) Goh Liu Ying
Macau	(South Korea) Lee Hyun-il	(China) Wang Shixian	(China) Chai Biao (China) Guo Zhendong	(South Korea) Jung Kyung-eun (South Korea) Kim Ha-na	(Indonesia) Tontowi Ahmad (Indonesia) Liliyana Natsir
Korea	(South Korea) Lee Hyun-il	(South Korea) Sung Ji-hyun	(South Korea) Ko Sung-hyun (South Korea) Yoo Yeon-seong	(South Korea) Eom Hye-won (South Korea) Jang Ye-na	(South Korea) Yoo Yeon-seong (South Korea) Jang Ye-na
India	(Indonesia) Taufik Hidayat	(Thailand) Ratchanok Inthanon	(Japan) Naoki Kawamae (Japan) Shōji Satō	(Singapore) Shinta Mulia Sari (Singapore) Yao Lei	(Thailand) Sudket Prapakamol (Thailand) Saralee Thungthongkam

=== Performance by countries ===
Tabulated below are the Grand Prix performances based on countries. Only countries who have won a title are listed:

Team	GER	SUI	AUS	MAS	THA	RUS	USA	CAN	VIE	TPE	INA	NED	GER	MAC	KOR	IND	Total
South Korea	1	3			1		3	1		4				2	5		20
China	2		1	1	3	2		1			2		1	2			15
Japan	1		3	1		1	1						1			1	9
Indonesia				1					2	1	2			1		1	8
Thailand			1									2	1			2	6
Chinese Taipei					1		1	1				1					4
Malaysia				2							1		1				4
Russia						2			1								3
Denmark		1											1				2
Germany								2									2
Singapore									1							1	2
India		1															1
Netherlands												1					1
Poland												1					1
Vietnam									1								1
England	0.5																0.5
Scotland	0.5																0.5

== Grand Prix Gold ==
German Open

- RWE-Sporthalle, Mülheim, Germany, March 1–6, 2011.

Category	Winners	Runners-up	Score
Men's singles	(China) Lin Dan	(China) Chen Jin	21–19, 21–11
Women's singles	(China) Liu Xin	(Japan) Ayane Kurihara	21–13, 15–21, 21–9
Men's doubles	(South Korea) Jung Jae-sung / Lee Yong-dae	(South Korea) Kim Ki-jung / Kim Sa-rang	21–19, 18–21, 21–11
Women's doubles	(Japan) Mizuki Fujii / Reika Kakiiwa	(South Korea) Ha Jung-eun / Kim Min-jung	21–16, 21–14
Mixed doubles	(Scotland) Robert Blair / (England) Gabrielle White	(Japan) Shintaro Ikeda / Reiko Shiota	16–21, 21–16, 21–15

Swiss Open

- St. Jakobshalle, Basel, Switzerland, March 15–20, 2011.

Category	Winners	Runners-up	Score
Men's singles	(South Korea) Park Sung-hwan	(South Korea) Lee Hyun-il	17–21, 21–9, 21–17
Women's singles	(India) Saina Nehwal	(South Korea) Sung Ji-hyun	21–13, 21–14
Men's doubles	(South Korea) Ko Sung-hyun / Yoo Yeon-seong	(South Korea) Jung Jae-sung / Lee Yong-dae	21–17, 21–16
Women's doubles	(South Korea) Ha Jung-eun / Kim Min-jung	(South Korea) Jung Kyung-eun / Kim Ha-na	21–12, 21–13
Mixed doubles	(Denmark) Joachim Fischer Nielsen / Christinna Pedersen	(England) Nathan Robertson / Jenny Wallwork	23–21, 21–14

Australian Open

- Melbourne Sports and Aquatic Centre, Melbourne, Australia, April 5–10, 2011.

Category	Winners	Runners-up	Score
Men's singles	(Japan) Sho Sasaki	(Malaysia) Wong Choong Hann	21–11, 12–21, 21–19
Women's singles	(China) Liu Xin	(Thailand) Porntip Buranaprasertsuk	21–14, 21–9
Men's doubles	(Japan) Hiroyuki Endo / Kenichi Hayakawa	(Japan) Naoki Kawamae / Shoji Sato	21–17, 21–18
Women's doubles	(Japan) Shizuka Matsuo / Mami Naito	(Malaysia) Chin Eei Hui / Wong Pei Tty	21–18, 21–11
Mixed doubles	(Thailand) Songphon Anugritayawon / Kunchala Voravichitchaikul	(Japan) Hirokatsu Hashimoto / Mizuki Fujii	21–15, 21–9

Malaysia Open

- Sultan Abdul Halim Stadium, Alor Setar, Malaysia, May 3–8, 2011.

Category	Winners	Runners-up	Score
Men's singles	(Malaysia) Lee Chong Wei	(China) Bao Chunlai	21–9, 21–19
Women's singles	(China) Wang Xin	(India) Saina Nehwal	13–21, 21–8, 21–14
Men's doubles	(Malaysia) Koo Kien Keat / Tan Boon Heong	(Indonesia) Alvent Yulianto / Hendra Aprida Gunawan	21–16, 21–7
Women's doubles	(Japan) Miyuki Maeda / Satoko Suetsuna	(Japan) Shizuka Matsuo / Mami Naito	21–18, 21–13
Mixed doubles	(Indonesia) Tantowi Ahmad / Lilyana Natsir	(Malaysia) Chan Peng Soon / Goh Liu Ying	18–21, 21–15, 21–19

Thailand Open

- CU Sport Complex, Bangkok, Thailand, June 7–12, 2011.

Category	Winners	Runners-up	Score
Men's singles	(China) Chen Long	(South Korea) Lee Hyun-il	21–8, 21–19
Women's singles	(China) Li Xuerui	(China) Jiang Yanjiao	14–21, 21–14, 21–14
Men's doubles	(South Korea) Jung Jae-sung / Lee Yong-dae	(Indonesia) Alvent Yulianto Chandra / Hendra Aprida Gunawan	24–22, 21–14
Women's doubles	(China) Tian Qing / Zhao Yunlei	(China) Cheng Shu / Bao Yixin	21–7, 21–8
Mixed doubles	(Chinese Taipei) Lee Sheng-mu / Chien Yu-chin	(Indonesia) Nova Widianto / Vita Marissa	21–10, 23–21

U.S. Open

- Orange County Badminton Club, Orange, California, United States, July 11–16, 2011.

Category	Winners	Runners-up	Score
Men's singles	(Japan) Sho Sasaki	(Vietnam) Nguyễn Tiến Minh	21–17, 21–18
Women's singles	(Chinese Taipei) Tai Tzu-ying	(Japan) Sayaka Sato	21–16, 19–21, 21–6
Men's doubles	(South Korea) Ko Sung-hyun / Lee Yong-dae	(United States) Howard Bach / Tony Gunawan	21–9, 21–19
Women's doubles	(South Korea) Ha Jung-eun / Kim Min-jung	(South Korea) Jung Kyung-eun / Kim Ha-na	14–21, 22–20, 21–18
Mixed doubles	(South Korea) Lee Yong-dae / Ha Jung-eun	(Chinese Taipei) Chen Hung-ling / Cheng Wen-hsing	21–19, 21–13

Chinese Taipei Open

- Taipei County Shinjuang Stadium, Taipei, Republic of China, September 6–11, 2011.

Category	Winners	Runners-up	Score
Men's singles	(Indonesia) Tommy Sugiarto	(Thailand) Tanongsak Saensomboonsuk	21–15, 15–21, 21–17
Women's singles	(South Korea) Sung Ji-hyun	(Thailand) Ratchanok Inthanon	22–20, 21–14
Men's doubles	(South Korea) Ko Sung-hyun / Yoo Yeon-seong	(South Korea) Jung Jae-sung / Lee Yong-dae	23–21, 21–17
Women's doubles	(South Korea) Ha Jung-eun / Kim Min-jung	(Indonesia) Greysia Polii / Meiliana Jauhari	17–21, 21–18, 2–0 Retired
Mixed doubles	(South Korea) Ko Sung-hyun / Eom Hye-won	(Indonesia) Tontowi Ahmad / Lilyana Natsir	24–22, 16–21, 21–17

Indonesia Open

- Gor Bulutangkis Palaran Samarinda, Samarinda, Indonesia, September 27–October 2, 2011.

Category	Winners	Runners-up	Score
Men's singles	(Indonesia) Dionysius Hayom Rumbaka	(Indonesia) Tommy Sugiarto	21–16, 21–17
Women's singles	(China) Chen Xiaojia	(France) Pi Hongyan	19–21, 21–15, 21–17
Men's doubles	(Indonesia) Mohammad Ahsan / Bona Septano	(Japan) Hiroyuki Endo / Kenichi Hayakawa	21–13, 21–14
Women's doubles	(Malaysia) Vivian Hoo Kah Mun / Woon Khe Wei	(China) Bao Yixin / Zhong Qianxin	19–21, 21–19, 21–18
Mixed doubles	(China) He Hanbin / Bao Yixin	(China) Xu Chen / Ma Jin	21–19, 1–4 Retired

Bitburger Open

- Saarlandhalle, Saarbrücken, Germany, November 1–6, 2011.

Category	Winners	Runners-up	Score
Men's singles	(Denmark) Hans-Kristian Vittinghus	(China) Wang Zhengming	21–18, 21–10
Women's singles	(China) Li Xuerui	(Netherlands) Yao Jie	21–8, 21–9
Men's doubles	(Thailand) Bodin Issara / Maneepong Jongjit	(China) Liu Xiaolong / Qiu Zihan	21–14, 21–16
Women's doubles	(Japan) Mizuki Fujii / Reika Kakiiwa	(Sweden) Emelie Lennartsson / Emma Wengberg	21–8, 21–11
Mixed doubles	(Malaysia) Chan Peng Soon / Goh Liu Ying	(Denmark) Thomas Laybourn / Kamilla Rytter Juhl	21–18, 14–21, 27–25

Macau Open

- Cotai Arena, The Venetian, Macau, November 29–December 4, 2011.

Category	Winners	Runners-up	Score
Men's singles	(South Korea) Lee Hyun-il	(China) Du Pengyu	17–21, 21–11, 21–18
Women's singles	(China) Wang Shixian	(China) Han Li	21–14, 21–14
Men's doubles	(China) Chai Biao / Guo Zhendong	(South Korea) Ko Sung-hyun / Yoo Yeon-seong	21–19, 21–19
Women's doubles	(South Korea) Jung Kyung-eun / Kim Ha-na	(South Korea) Eom Hye-won / Jang Ye-na	8–4 Retired
Mixed doubles	(Indonesia) Tontowi Ahmad / Lilyana Natsir	(Chinese Taipei) Chen Hung-ling / Cheng Wen-hsing	Walkover

Korea Open

- Hwasun Indoor Stadium, Hwasun, South Korea, December 6–11, 2011.

Category	Winners	Runners-up	Score
Men's singles	(South Korea) Lee Hyun-il	(South Korea) Shon Wan-ho	21–18, 21–16
Women's singles	(South Korea) Sung Ji-hyun	(China) Han Li	21–18, 21–16
Men's doubles	(South Korea) Ko Sung-hyun / Yoo Yeon-seong	(South Korea) Jung Jae-sung / Lee Yong-dae	21–15, 24–22
Women's doubles	(South Korea) Eom Hye-won / Jang Ye-na	(Singapore) Shinta Mulia Sari / Yao Lei	21–15, 21–16
Mixed doubles	(South Korea) Yoo Yeon-seong / Jang Ye-na	(South Korea) Kim Ki-jung / Jung Kyung-eun	21–17, 21–19

India Open

- Babu Banarasi Das Indoor Stadium, Lucknow, India, December 20–25, 2011.

Category	Winners	Runners-up	Score
Men's singles	(Indonesia) Taufik Hidayat	(India) Sourabh Varma	21–15, 21–18
Women's singles	(Thailand) Ratchanok Inthanon	(Thailand) Porntip Buranaprasertsuk	Walkover
Men's doubles	(Japan) Naoki Kawamae / Shōji Satō	(Indonesia) Andrei Adistia / Christopher Rusdianto	21–17, 12–21, 23–21
Women's doubles	(Singapore) Shinta Mulia Sari / Yao Lei	(Japan) Miyuki Maeda / Satoko Suetsuna	21–17, 21–18
Mixed doubles	(Thailand) Sudket Prapakamol / Saralee Thungthongkam	(Indonesia) Muhammad Rizal / Debby Susanto	16–21, 21–18, 21–11

== Grand Prix ==
Russian Open

- Sports Hall Olympic, Vladivostok, Russia, June 28–July 3, 2011.

Category	Winners	Runners-up	Score
Men's singles	(China) Zhou Wenlong	(China) Tian Houwei	21–18, 21–15
Women's singles	(China) Lu Lan	(China) Chen Xiaojia	20–22, 21–15, 23–21
Men's doubles	(Japan) Naoki Kawamae / Shoji Sato	(Japan) Hiroyuki Endo / Kenichi Hayakawa	21–18, 21–17
Women's doubles	(Russia) Valeria Sorokina / Nina Vislova	(Japan) Misaki Matsutomo / Ayaka Takahashi	22–20, 21–18
Mixed doubles	(Russia) Alexandr Nikolaenko / Valeria Sorokina	(Japan) Shintaro Ikeda / Reiko Shiota	21–18, 21–14

Canada Open

- Richmond Oval, Richmond, Vancouver, British Columbia, Canada, July 19–24, 2011.

Category	Winners	Runners-up	Score
Men's singles	(Germany) Marc Zwiebler	(Indonesia) Taufik Hidayat	21–13, 25–23
Women's singles	(Chinese Taipei) Cheng Shao-chieh	(France) Pi Hongyan	21–15, 21–11
Men's doubles	(South Korea) Ko Sung-hyun / Lee Yong-dae	(China) Liu Xiaolong / Qiu Zihan	21–18, 21–16
Women's doubles	(China) Cheng Shu / Bao Yixin	(Chinese Taipei) Cheng Wen-hsing / Chien Yu-chin	21–13, 23–21
Mixed doubles	(Germany) Michael Fuchs / Birgit Michels	(Chinese Taipei) Chen Hung-ling / Cheng Wen-hsing	21–10, 23–21

Vietnam Open

- Phan Dinh Phung Stadium, Ho Chi Minh City, Vietnam, August 22–28, 2011.

Category	Winners	Runners-up	Score
Men's singles	(Vietnam) Nguyen Tien Minh	(Japan) Sho Sasaki	21–13, 21–17
Women's singles	(Singapore) Fu Mingtian	(Japan) Kaori Imabeppu	21–18, 16–21, 21–8
Men's doubles	(Indonesia) Angga Pratama / Rian Agung Saputro	(Singapore) Danny Bawa Chrisnanta / Chayut Triyachart	21–12, 16–21, 21–19
Women's doubles	(Indonesia) Anneke Feinya Agustin / Nitya Krishinda Maheswari	(Singapore) Shinta Mulia Sari / Yao Lei	23–21, 26–24
Mixed doubles	(Russia) Vitalij Durkin / Nina Vislova	(South Korea) Chung Eui-seok / Yoo Hyun-young	21–16, 21–13

Dutch Open

- Topsportcentrum Almere, Almere, Netherlands, October 11–16, 2011.

Category	Winners	Runners-up	Score
Men's singles	(Chinese Taipei) Hsueh Hsuan-yi	(Chinese Taipei) Chou Tien-chen	18–21, 21–15, 21–16
Women's singles	(Netherlands) Yao Jie	(India) Pusarla Venkata Sindhu	21–16, 21–17
Men's doubles	(Poland) Adam Cwalina / Michał Łogosz	(Germany) Ingo Kindervater / Johannes Schoettler	21–19, 19–21, 21–14
Women's doubles	(Thailand) Duanganong Aroonkesorn / Kunchala Voravichitchaikul	(Singapore) Shinta Mulia Sari / Yao Lei	21–10, 21–16
Mixed doubles	(Thailand) Songphon Anugritayawon / Kunchala Voravichitchaikul	(Thailand) Sudket Prapakamol / Saralee Thungthongkam	21–17, 24–22
