= 2011 Malaysia Open Grand Prix Gold =

Tournament details
- Dates: 3 – 8 May 2011
- Level: Grand Prix Gold
- Total prize money: US$120,000
- Venue: Stadium Sultan Abdul Halim
- Location: Alor Setar, Malaysia

Champions
- Men's singles: (Malaysia) Lee Chong Wei
- Women's singles: (China) Wang Xin
- Men's doubles: (Malaysia) Koo Kien Keat (Malaysia) Tan Boon Heong
- Women's doubles: (Japan) Miyuki Maeda (Japan) Satoko Suetsuna
- Mixed doubles: (Indonesia) Tontowi Ahmad (Indonesia) Liliyana Natsir

The 2011 Malaysia Open Grand Prix Gold was the fifth Grand Prix's badminton tournament of the 2011 BWF Grand Prix Gold and Grand Prix. The tournament was held in Alor Setar, Malaysia on 3–8 May 2011 and had a total purse of $120,000. The tournament has moved from Johor Bahru, where its first two editions had been held.

== Men's singles ==
=== Seeds ===
1. (Malaysia) Lee Chong Wei (champion)
2. (Indonesia) Taufik Hidayat (withdrew)
3. (Vietnam) Nguyen Tien Minh (semi-finals)
4. (China) Chen Jin (third round)
5. (Indonesia) Simon Santoso (withdrew)
6. (South Korea) Park Sung-hwan (quarter-finals)
7. (China) Bao Chunlai (final)
8. (Malaysia) Wong Choong Hann (first round)
9. (South Korea) Lee Hyun-il (quarter-finals)
10. (Indonesia) Alamsyah Yunus (withdrew)
11. (Japan) Sho Sasaki (semi-finals)
12. (India) Parupalli Kashyap (second round)
13. (Indonesia) Dionysius Hayom Rumbaka (first round)
14. (South Korea) Son Wan-ho (third round)
15. (Indonesia) Tommy Sugiarto (third round)
16. (Japan) Kazushi Yamada (third round)

=== Finals ===
Quarterfinals
1	(Malaysia) Lee Chong Wei	21	21
(France) Brice Leverdez	17	8
11	(Japan) Sho Sasaki	12	21	21
6	(South Korea) Park Sung-hwan	21	8	16
(Indonesia) Sony Dwi Kuncoro	18	1^{r}
3	(Vietnam) Nguyen Tien Minh	21	5
7	(China) Bao Chunlai	21	13	21
9	(South Korea) Lee Hyun-il	18	21	9

Semifinals
1	(Malaysia) Lee Chong Wei	21	21
11	(Japan) Sho Sasaki	13	14
3	(Vietnam) Nguyen Tien Minh	12	21	14
7	(China) Bao Chunlai	21	19	21

Final
1	(Malaysia) Lee Chong Wei	21	21
7	(China) Bao Chunlai	9	19

=== Top half ===
==== Section 1 ====
First Round
1	(Malaysia) Lee C W	21	21
(Singapore) R Gonansa	7	16
(Japan) T Ueda	21	21
(Malaysia) Lim F Y	17	11
15	(Indonesia) T Sugiarto	21	21
(United States) S Pongnairat	12	12
(Thailand) S Avihingsanon	21	21
Q4	(Malaysia) Soong J V	10	14

Second Round
1	(Malaysia) Lee C W	21	21
(Japan) T Ueda	8	12
15	(Indonesia) T Sugiarto	21	21
(Thailand) S Avihingsanon	12	9

Third Round
1	(Malaysia) Lee C W	21	21
15	(Indonesia) T Sugiarto	19	19

==== Section 2 ====
First Round
PFQ	(Hong Kong) Tam C H	21	20	21
Q6	(Malaysia) Goh G C	18	22	14
(India) R. M. V. Gurusaidutt	21	21	18
(Malaysia) B Wong	19	23	21
12	(India) P Kashyap	22	21
(Malaysia) Lok C C	20	17
(France) B Leverdez	21	12	21
(Singapore) A Chen	17	21	16

Second Round
PFQ	(Hong Kong) Tam C H	21	14	13
(Malaysia) B Wong	18	21	21
12	(India) P Kashyap	21	15	18
(France) B Leverdez	17	21	21

Third Round
(Malaysia) B Wong	21	9	15
(France) B Leverdez	14	21	21

==== Section 3 ====
First Round
4	(China) Chen J	21	21
(Brazil) D Paiola	7	8
PFQ	(Malaysia) Kuan K C	19	21	11
(Malaysia) M A Abdul Latif	21	19	21
11	(Japan) S Sasaki	22	21
Q3	(Malaysia) Kuan B H	20	17
(Hong Kong) Chan Y L	14	19
(India) A Bhat	21	21

Second Round
4	(China) Chen J	21	21
(Malaysia) M A Abdul Latif	18	14
11	(Japan) S Sasaki	13	22	21
(India) A Bhat	21	20	15

Third Round
4	(China) Chen J	21	19	13
11	(Japan) S Sasaki	17	21	21

==== Section 4 ====
First Round
6	(South Korea) Park S-h	15	21	21
(Malaysia) Goh S H	21	11	11
(Malaysia) Y Krishnan	21	21
PFQ	(Australia) N Oon	13	15
14	(South Korea) Son W-h	21	21
(Hong Kong) Wei N	8	9
(Malaysia) M R Misbun	21	13	16
(Hong Kong) Chan Y K	14	21	21

Second Round
6	(South Korea) Park S-h	21	19	21
(Malaysia) Y Krishnan	13	21	17
14	(South Korea) Son W-h	23	21	21
(Hong Kong) Chan Y K	25	10	18

Third Round
6	(South Korea) Park S-h	21	21
14	(South Korea) Son W-h	17	15

=== Bottom half ===
==== Section 5 ====
First Round
PFQ	(Mexico) A López	16	12
Q2	(Malaysia) Saw W J	21	21
(Singapore) D Wong	21	21
PFQ	(Malaysia) Yeoh K B	11	18
Q1	(Vietnam) Nguyen H n	12	18
(Indonesia) S D Kuncoro	21	21
(India) A Sridhar	21	21
8	(Malaysia) Wong C H	15	15

Second Round
Q2	(Malaysia) Saw W J	15	10
(Singapore) D Wong	21	21
(Indonesia) S D Kuncoro	21	21
(India) A Sridhar	18	7

Third Round
(Singapore) D Wong	18	18
(Indonesia) S D Kuncoro	21	21

==== Section 6 ====
First Round
(Thailand) P Vilailak	21	21
(Malaysia) Tan C S	18	12
(Malaysia) M H Hashim	21	21
13	(Indonesia) D H Rumbaka	17	14
(China) Chen Y K	21	18	21
(Malaysia) Chan K B	18	21	9
(India) A Pawar	21	7	16
3	(Vietnam) Nguyen T M	10	21	21

Second Round
(Thailand) P Vilailak	13	12
(Malaysia) M H Hashim	21	21
(China) Chen Y K	12	13
3	(Vietnam) Nguyen T M	21	21

Third Round
(Malaysia) M H Hashim	21	18	6
3	(Vietnam) Nguyen T M	19	21	21

==== Section 7 ====
First Round
(United States) B Seguin	16	16
(Singapore) Huang C	21	21
Q5	(Malaysia) J S Chiang	11	13
16	(Japan) K Yamada	21	21
(Mexico) L Muñoz	13	13
(Malaysia) I Z Zainuddin	21	21
(Malaysia) Chong W F	8	11
7	(China) Bao C L	21	21

Second Round
(Singapore) Huang C	22	17
16	(Japan) K Yamada	24	21
(Malaysia) I Z Zainuddin	11	15
7	(China) Bao C L	21	21

Third Round
16	(Japan) K Yamada	21	15	7
7	(China) Bao C L	18	21	21

==== Section 8 ====
First Round
Q7	(Malaysia) Loh W S	12	13
(Hong Kong) Wong W K	21	21
(India) A Jayaram	12	21	18
9	(South Korea) Lee H-i	21	12	21
Q8	(Malaysia) N M A Ayub	14	3
(Malaysia) M S Ismail	21	21
(Malaysia) Liew D	10	21	21
PFQ	(Malaysia) Z Zulkiffli	21	17	11

Second Round
(Hong Kong) Wong W K	20	10
9	(South Korea) Lee H-i	22	21
(Malaysia) M S Ismail	12	12
(Malaysia) Liew D	21	21

Third Round
9	(South Korea) Lee H-i	21	21
(Malaysia) Liew D	14	12

== Women's singles ==
=== Seeds ===
1. (India) Saina Nehwal (final)
2. (China) Wang Xin (champion)
3. (China) Jiang Yanjiao (quarter-finals)
4. (South Korea) Bae Yeon-ju (semi-finals)
5. (Hong Kong) Yip Pui Yin (withdrew)
6. (Japan) Eriko Hirose (second round)
7. (South Korea) Sung Ji-hyun (semi-finals)
8. (Netherlands) Yao Jie (first round)

=== Finals ===
Semifinals
1	(India) Saina Nehwal	21	21
7	(South Korea) Sung Ji-hyun	14	13
4	(South Korea) Bae Yeon-ju	6	19
2	(China) Wang Xin	21	21

Final
1	(India) Saina Nehwal	21	8	14
2	(China) Wang Xin	13	21	21

=== Top half ===
==== Section 1 ====
First Round
1	(India) Saina Nehwal	21	21
(Singapore) Chen Jiayuan	16	12
(Japan) Ayane Kurihara	21	21
(Singapore) Fu Mingtian	18	17
6	(Japan) Eriko Hirose	21	21
Q2	(Indonesia) Hera Desi	10	17
(Austria) Simone Prutsch	11	11
Q1	(China) Wang Lin	21	21

Second Round
1	(India) Saina Nehwal	21	21
(Japan) Ayane Kurihara	14	17
6	(Japan) Eriko Hirose	11	15
Q2	(China) Wang Lin	21	21

Quarterfinals
1	(India) Saina Nehwal	14	21	21
Q2	(China) Wang Lin	21	19	19

==== Section 2 ====
First Round
3	(China) Jiang Yanjiao	21	21
(United States) Rena Wang	12	13
(Indonesia) Maria Febe Kusumastuti	21	21
(Thailand) Salakjit Ponsana	8	16
7	(South Korea) Sung Ji-hyun	21	21
(Indonesia) Adrianti Firdasari	18	15
(Slovenia) Maja Tvrdy	0^{r}
(Hong Kong) Chan Tsz Ka	3

Second Round
3	(China) Jiang Yanjiao	21	21
(Indonesia) Maria Febe Kusumastuti	12	16
7	(South Korea) Sung Ji-hyun	21	21
(Hong Kong) Chan Tsz Ka	18	9

Quarterfinals
3	(China) Jiang Yanjiao	23	21	18
7	(South Korea) Sung Ji-hyun	25	13	21

=== Bottom half ===
==== Section 3 ====
First Round
(United States) Cee Nantana Ketpura	21	15	13
Q3	(Thailand) Sapsiree Taerattanachai	16	21	21
(Indonesia) Aprilla Yuswandari	21	21
PFQ	(Thailand) Nitchaon Jindapon	19	12
(Indonesia) Lindaweni Fanetri	13	15
(Singapore) Gu Juan	21	21
(Japan) Kaori Imabeppu	19	12
4	(South Korea) Bae Yeon-ju	21	21

Second Round
Q3	(Thailand) Sapsiree Taerattanachai	17	19
(Indonesia) Aprilla Yuswandari	21	21
(Singapore) Gu Juan	16	16
4	(South Korea) Bae Yeon-ju	21	21

Quarterfinals
(Indonesia) Aprilla Yuswandari	16	10
4	(South Korea) Bae Yeon-ju	21	21

==== Section 4 ====
First Round
(Singapore) Xing Aiying	21	7	19
(Thailand) Porntip Buranaprasertsuk	19	21	21
(Japan) Ai Goto	22	19	21
8	(Netherlands) Yao Jie	20	21	13
(Japan) Sayaka Sato	7	11
(Thailand) Ratchanok Intanon	21	21
Q4	(Hong Kong) Poon Lok Yan	16	11
2	(China) Wang Xin	21	21

Second Round
(Thailand) Porntip Buranaprasertsuk	18	13
(Japan) Ai Goto	21	21
(Thailand) Ratchanok Intanon	15	20
2	(China) Wang Xin	21	22

Quarterfinals
(Japan) Ai Goto	21	16
2	(China) Wang Xin	23	21

== Men's doubles ==
=== Seeds ===
1. (Malaysia) Koo Kien Keat / Tan Boon Heong (champions)
2. (Indonesia) Markis Kido / Hendra Setiawan (second round)
3. (Indonesia) Mohammad Ahsan / Bona Septano (quarter-finals)
4. (Indonesia) Alvent Yulianto Chandra / Hendra Aprida Gunawan (final)
5. (Japan) Hirokatsu Hashimoto / Noriyasu Hirata (quarter-finals)
6. (Japan) Hiroyuki Endo / Kenichi Hayakawa (quarter-finals)
7. (Japan) Naoki Kawamae / Shoji Sato (second round)
8. (South Korea) Cho Gun-woo / Kwon Yi-goo (semi-finals)

=== Finals ===
Semifinals
1	(Malaysia) Koo Kien Keat (Malaysia) Tan Boon Heong	21	18	21
(Netherlands) Ruud Bosch (Netherlands) Koen Ridder	17	21	10
4	(Indonesia) Alvent Yulianto Chandra (Indonesia) Hendra Aprida Gunawan	21	19	21
8	(South Korea) Cho Gun-woo (South Korea) Kwon Yi-goo	16	21	18

Final
1	(Malaysia) Koo Kien Keat (Malaysia) Tan Boon Heong	21	21
4	(Indonesia) Alvent Yulianto Chandra (Indonesia) Hendra Aprida Gunawan	16	7

=== Top half ===
==== Section 1 ====
First Round
1	(Malaysia) Koo Kien Keat (Malaysia) Tan Boon Heong	21	21
(Japan) Yoshiteru Hirobe (Japan) Kenta Kazuno	18	13
(Malaysia) Chooi Kah Ming (Malaysia) Ow Yao Han	21	23
(Thailand) Songphon Anugritayawon (Thailand) Sudket Prapakamol	18	21
6	(Japan) Hiroyuki Endo (Japan) Kenichi Hayakawa	21	21
(Malaysia) Yogendran Krishnan (Malaysia) Yeoh Kay Bin	17	10
PFQ	(Hong Kong) Leung Chun Yiu (Hong Kong) Tam Chun Hei	10	21	16
(South Korea) Kim Gi-jung (South Korea) Kim Sa-rang	21	17	21

Second Round
1	(Malaysia) Koo Kien Keat (Malaysia) Tan Boon Heong	21	21
(Malaysia) Chooi Kah Ming (Malaysia) Ow Yao Han	9	13
6	(Japan) Hiroyuki Endo (Japan) Kenichi Hayakawa	21
(South Korea) Kim Gi-jung (South Korea) Kim Sa-rang	16^{r}

Quarterfinals
1	(Malaysia) Koo Kien Keat (Malaysia) Tan Boon Heong	15	21	21
6	(Japan) Hiroyuki Endo (Japan) Kenichi Hayakawa	21	14	17

==== Section 2 ====
First Round
3	(Indonesia) Mohammad Ahsan (Indonesia) Bona Septano	21	9	21
(Malaysia) Goh V Shem (Malaysia) Lim Khim Wah	16	21	14
(Indonesia) Fernando Kurniawan (Indonesia) Wifqi Windarto	21	22
(China) Hong Wei (China) Shen Ye	14	20
7	(Japan) Naoki Kawamae (Japan) Shoji Sato	13	21	21
(Malaysia) Zakry Latif (Malaysia) Hoon Thien How	21	16	9
Q4	(Malaysia) Sant Enos Jani (Malaysia) Tai An Kang	14	16
(Netherlands) Ruud Bosch (Netherlands) Koen Ridder	21	21

Second Round
3	(Indonesia) Mohammad Ahsan (Indonesia) Bona Septano	21	14	21
(Indonesia) Fernando Kurniawan (Indonesia) Wifqi Windarto	19	21	16
7	(Japan) Naoki Kawamae (Japan) Shoji Sato	12	21	17
(Netherlands) Ruud Bosch (Netherlands) Koen Ridder	21	13	21

Quarterfinals
3	(Indonesia) Mohammad Ahsan (Indonesia) Bona Septano	20	18
(Netherlands) Ruud Bosch (Netherlands) Koen Ridder	22	21

=== Bottom half ===
==== Section 3 ====
First Round
(Malaysia) Fairuzizuan Tazari (Malaysia) Ong Soon Hock	16	21	21
Q3	(Malaysia) Nelson Heg (Malaysia) Teo Ee Yi	21	12	19
(Singapore) Danny Bawa Chrisnanta (Singapore) Terry Yeo	11	16
5	(Japan) Hirokatsu Hashimoto (Japan) Noriyasu Hirata	21	21
(Malaysia) Gan Teik Chai (Malaysia) Tan Bin Shen	21	21
(Mexico) Andres Lopez (Mexico) Lino Munoz	8	9
Q1	(Malaysia) Tan Wee Tat (Malaysia) Tan Yip Jiun	15	13
4	(Indonesia) Alvent Yulianto Chandra (Indonesia) Hendra Aprida Gunawan	21	21

Second Round
(Malaysia) Fairuzizuan Tazari (Malaysia) Ong Soon Hock	17	18
5	(Japan) Hirokatsu Hashimoto (Japan) Noriyasu Hirata	21	21
(Malaysia) Gan Teik Chai (Malaysia) Tan Bin Shen	21	16	17
4	(Indonesia) Alvent Yulianto Chandra (Indonesia) Hendra Aprida Gunawan	14	21	21

Quarterfinals
5	(Japan) Hirokatsu Hashimoto (Japan) Noriyasu Hirata	15	21	20
4	(Indonesia) Alvent Yulianto Chandra (Indonesia) Hendra Aprida Gunawan	21	17	22

==== Section 4 ====
First Round
(Thailand) Patipat Chalardchaleam (Thailand) Nipitphon Puangpuapech	21	21
(Malaysia) Zheng Lin Pang (Malaysia) Yew Hong Kheng	18	18
Q2	(Indonesia) Albert Saputra (Indonesia) Rizky Yanu Kresnayadi	10	21	12
8	(South Korea) Cho Gun-woo (South Korea) Kwon Yi-goo	21	16	21
(Malaysia) Lutfi Zaim (Malaysia) Vountus Indra Mawan	21	21
(Indonesia) Angga Pratama (Indonesia) Rian Agung Saputro	18	17
PFQ	(Indonesia) Jones Rafli Jansen (Indonesia) Dandi Prabudita	10	13
2	(Indonesia) Markis Kido (Indonesia) Hendra Setiawan	21	21

Second Round
(Thailand) Patipat Chalardchaleam (Thailand) Nipitphon Puangpuapech	17	16
8	(South Korea) Cho Gun-woo (South Korea) Kwon Yi-goo	21	21
(Malaysia) Lutfi Zaim (Malaysia) Vountus Indra Mawan	21	18	21
2	(Indonesia) Markis Kido (Indonesia) Hendra Setiawan	13	21	13

Quarterfinals
8	(South Korea) Cho Gun-woo (South Korea) Kwon Yi-goo	21	21
(Malaysia) Lutfi Zaim (Malaysia) Vountus Indra Mawan	13	17

== Women's doubles ==
=== Seeds ===
1. (Japan) Miyuki Maeda / Satoko Suetsuna (champions)
2. (Japan) Mizuki Fujii / Reika Kakiiwa (second round)
3. (Thailand) Duanganong Aroonkesorn / Kunchala Voravichitchaikul (second round)
4. (Indonesia) Meiliana Jauhari / Greysia Polii (semi-finals)
5. (Japan) Shizuka Matsuo / Mami Naito (final)
6. (Singapore) Shinta Mulia Sari / Yao Lei (first round)
7. (Malaysia) Chin Eei Hui / Wong Pei Tty (second round)
8. (Netherlands) Lotte Jonathans / Paulien van Dooremalen (quarter-finals)

=== Finals ===
Semifinals
1	(Japan) Miyuki Maeda (Japan) Satoko Suetsuna	21	21
4	(Indonesia) Meiliana Jauhari (Indonesia) Greysia Polii	19	16
5	(Japan) Shizuka Matsuo (Japan) Mami Naito	21	21
(China) Luo Ying (China) Luo Yu	10	9

Final
1	(Japan) Miyuki Maeda (Japan) Satoko Suetsuna	21	21
5	(Japan) Shizuka Matsuo (Japan) Mami Naito	18	13

=== Top half ===
==== Section 1 ====
First Round
1	(Japan) Miyuki Maeda (Japan) Satoko Suetsuna	21	21
(Malaysia) Ng Hui Ern (Malaysia) Ng Hui Lin	12	10
Q4	(Singapore) Fu Mingtian (Singapore) Gu Juan	21	12	19
(Australia) Leanne Choo (Australia) Renuga Veeran	16	21	21
8	(Netherlands) Lotte Jonathans (Netherlands) Paulien Van Dooremalen	21	21
(Malaysia) Vivian Hoo Kah Mun (Malaysia) Lim Yin Loo	15	15
(Singapore) Chen Jiayuan (Singapore) Xing Aiying	21	21
Q3	(Malaysia) Shevon Jamie Lai (Malaysia) Lim Chiew Sien	16	16

Second Round
1	(Japan) Miyuki Maeda (Japan) Satoko Suetsuna	21	21
(Australia) Leanne Choo (Australia) Renuga Veeran	3	10
8	(Netherlands) Lotte Jonathans (Netherlands) Paulien Van Dooremalen	21	13	21
(Singapore) Chen Jiayuan (Singapore) Xing Aiying	10	21	18

Quarterfinals
1	(Japan) Miyuki Maeda (Japan) Satoko Suetsuna	21	21
8	(Netherlands) Lotte Jonathans (Netherlands) Paulien van Dooremalen	12	9

==== Section 2 ====
First Round
4	(Indonesia) Meiliana Jauhari (Indonesia) Greysia Polii	21	21
(South Korea) Chang Ye-na (South Korea) Kim Min-seo	11	16
(Macau) Wang Rong (Macau) Zhang Zhibo	13	21	21
(Indonesia) Della Destiara Haris (Indonesia) Suci Rizky Andini	21	16	18
6	(Singapore) Shinta Mulia Sari (Singapore) Yao Lei	19	10
Q1	(Indonesia) Anneke Feinya Agustin (Indonesia) Nitya Krishinda Maheswari	21	21
(Hong Kong) Chan Hung Yung (Hong Kong) Ng Ka Shun	6	23
(Thailand) Savitree Amitrapai (Thailand) Nessara Somsri	21	25

Second Round
4	(Indonesia) Meiliana Jauhari (Indonesia) Greysia Polii	20	21	21
(Macau) Wang Rong (Macau) Zhang Zhibo	21	12	18
Q1	(Indonesia) Anneke Feinya Agustin (Indonesia) Nitya Krishinda Maheswari	17	21	21
(Thailand) Savitree Amitrapai (Thailand) Nessara Somsri	21	16	16

Quarterfinals
4	(Indonesia) Meiliana Jauhari (Indonesia) Greysia Polii	21	22
Q1	(Indonesia) Anneke Feinya Agustin (Indonesia) Nitya Krishinda Maheswari	15	20

=== Bottom half ===
==== Section 3 ====
First Round
(Malaysia) Sonia Su Ya Cheah (Malaysia) Yang Li Lian	21	12	20
(United States) Iris Wang (United States) Rena Wang	10	21	22
(Malaysia) Chong Sook Chin (Malaysia) Goh Liu Ying	11	20
5	(Japan) Shizuka Matsuo (Japan) Mami Naito	21	22
(Indonesia) Lita Nurlita (Thailand) Saralee Thoungthongkam	21	21
(Singapore) Vanessa Neo Yu Yan (Singapore) Thng Ting Ting	7	4
(Japan) Misaki Matsutomo (Japan) Ayaka Takahashi	17	17
3	(Thailand) Duanganong Aroonkesorn (Thailand) Kunchala Voravichitchaikul	21	21

Second Round
(United States) Iris Wang (United States) Rena Wang	12	7
5	(Japan) Shizuka Matsuo (Japan) Mami Naito	21	21
(Indonesia) Lita Nurlita (Thailand) Saralee Thoungthongkam	21	21
3	(Thailand) Duanganong Aroonkesorn (Thailand) Kunchala Voravichitchaikul	19	19

Quarterfinals
5	(Japan) Shizuka Matsuo (Japan) Mami Naito	21	21
(Indonesia) Lita Nurlita (Thailand) Saralee Thoungthongkam	8	13

==== Section 4 ====
First Round
(China) Luo Ying (China) Luo Yu	21	21
(Indonesia) Vita Marissa (Indonesia) Nadya Melati	18	13
(Hong Kong) Poon Lok Yan (Hong Kong) Tse Ying Suet	21	21	15
7	(Malaysia) Chin Eei Hui (Malaysia) Wong Pei Tty	18	23	21
(Indonesia) Gebby Ristiyani Imawan (Indonesia) Tiara Rosalia Nuraidah	18	18
(South Korea) Jung Kyung-eun (South Korea) Kim Ha-na	21	21
Q2	(Malaysia) Marylen Ng (Malaysia) Woon Khe Wei	17	14
2	(Japan) Mizuki Fujii (Japan) Reika Kakiiwa	21	21

Second Round
(China) Luo Ying (China) Luo Yu	22	20	21
7	(Malaysia) Chin Eei Hui (Malaysia) Wong Pei Tty	20	22	9
(South Korea) Jung Kyung-eun (South Korea) Kim Ha-na	21	21
2	(Japan) Mizuki Fujii (Japan) Reika Kakiiwa	11	19

Quarterfinals
(China) Luo Ying (China) Luo Yu	17	21	21
(South Korea) Jung Kyung-eun (South Korea) Kim Ha-na	21	12	16

== Mixed doubles ==
=== Seeds ===
1. (Thailand) Sudket Prapakamol / Saralee Thoungthongkam (quarter-finals)
2. (Thailand) Songphon Anugritayawon / Kunchala Voravichitchaikul (semi-finals)
3. (Indonesia) Fran Kurniawan / Pia Zebadiah (semi-finals)
4. (Indonesia) Tontowi Ahmad / Liliyana Natsir (champions)
5. (Japan) Shintaro Ikeda / Reiko Shiota (quarter-finals)
6. (Malaysia) Chan Peng Soon / Goh Liu Ying (final)
7. (China) Xu Chen / Ma Jin (first round)
8. (Indonesia) Muhammad Rijal / Debby Susanto (withdrew)

=== Finals ===
Semifinals
6	(Malaysia) Chan Peng Soon (Malaysia) Goh Liu Ying	21	21
3	(Indonesia) Fran Kurniawan (Indonesia) Pia Zebadiah	14	10
4	(Indonesia) Tontowi Ahmad (Indonesia) Liliyana Natsir	21	14	21
2	(Thailand) Songphon Anugritayawon (Thailand) Kunchala Voravichitchaikul	13	21	12

Final
6	(Malaysia) Chan Peng Soon (Malaysia) Goh Liu Ying	21	15	19
4	(Indonesia) Tontowi Ahmad (Indonesia) Liliyana Natsir	18	21	21

=== Top half ===
==== Section 1 ====
First Round
1	(Thailand) Sudket Prapakamol (Thailand) Saralee Thoungthongkam	21	21
(Japan) Hirokatsu Hashimoto (Japan) Mizuki Fujii	19	14
(Hong Kong) Leung Chin Yiu (Hong Kong) Ng Ka Shun	20	20
(Netherlands) Ruud Bosch (Netherlands) Lotte Jonathans	22	22
6	(Malaysia) Chan Peng Soon (Malaysia) Goh Liu Ying	21	21	21
(Japan) Noriyasu Hirata (Japan) Miyuki Maeda	15	23	13
(South Korea) Kim Gi-jung (South Korea) Jung Kyung-eun	21	17	21
(Malaysia) Lim Khim Wah (Malaysia) Lim Yin Loo	13	21	9

Second Round
1	(Thailand) Sudket Prapakamol (Thailand) Saralee Thoungthongkam	21	21
(Netherlands) Ruud Bosch (Netherlands) Lotte Jonathans	13	16
6	(Malaysia) Chan Peng Soon (Malaysia) Goh Liu Ying	21	21
(South Korea) Kim Gi-jung (South Korea) Jung Kyung-eun	7	18

Quarterfinals
1	(Thailand) Sudket Prapakamol (Thailand) Saralee Thoungthongkam	27	17	14
6	(Malaysia) Chan Peng Soon (Malaysia) Goh Liu Ying	25	21	21

==== Section 2 ====
First Round
3	(Indonesia) Fran Kurniawan (Indonesia) Pia Zebadiah	15	21	21
(Thailand) Nipitphon Puangpuapech (Thailand) Nessara Somsri	21	12	16
(Indonesia) Markis Kido (Indonesia) Lita Nurlita	21	21
Q4	(Malaysia) Lutfi Zaim (Malaysia) Vivian Hoo Kah Mun	18	15
PFQ	(Malaysia) Razif Abdul Latif (Malaysia) Amelia Alicia Anscelly	11	16
PFQ	(Malaysia) Fairuzizuan Tazari (Malaysia) Ng Hui Lin	21	21
Q3	(Japan) Shoji Sato (Japan) Shizuka Matsuo	19	21	16
(Malaysia) Tan Wee Kiong (Malaysia) Woon Khe Wei	21	11	21

Second Round
3	(Indonesia) Fran Kurniawan (Indonesia) Pia Zebadiah	21	25
(Indonesia) Markis Kido (Indonesia) Lita Nurlita	10	23
PFQ	(Malaysia) Fairuzizuan Tazari (Malaysia) Ng Hui Lin	21	16	21
(Malaysia) Tan Wee Kiong (Malaysia) Woon Khe Wei	15	21	17

Quarterfinals
3	(Indonesia) Fran Kurniawan (Indonesia) Pia Zebadiah	21	21
PFQ	(Malaysia) Fairuzizuan Tazari (Malaysia) Ng Hui Lin	6	18

=== Bottom half ===
==== Section 3 ====
First Round
(Indonesia) Nova Widianto (Indonesia) Vita Marissa	20	21	23
Q2	(Japan) Kenichi Hayakawa (Japan) Misaki Matsutomo	22	10	21
(Switzerland) Anthony Dumartheray (Switzerland) Sabrina Jaquet	18	8
5	(Japan) Shintaro Ikeda (Japan) Reiko Shiota	21	21
(Hong Kong) Wong Wai Hong (Hong Kong) Chau Hoi Wah	18	20
Q1	(Malaysia) Tan Aik Quan (Malaysia) Lai Pei Jing	21	22
(Singapore) Danny Bawa Chrisnanta (Singapore) Vanessa Neo Yu Yan	15	21	5
4	(Indonesia) Tontowi Ahmad (Indonesia) Liliyana Natsir	21	18	21

Second Round
(Indonesia) Nova Widianto (Indonesia) Vita Marissa	16	21	19
5	(Japan) Shintaro Ikeda (Japan) Reiko Shiota	21	17	21
Q1	(Malaysia) Tan Aik Quan (Malaysia) Lai Pei Jing	13	13
4	(Indonesia) Tontowi Ahmad (Indonesia) Liliyana Natsir	21	21

Quarterfinals
5	(Japan) Shintaro Ikeda (Japan) Reiko Shiota	15	18
4	(Indonesia) Tontowi Ahmad (Indonesia) Liliyana Natsir	21	21

==== Section 4 ====
First Round
(Thailand) Maneepong Jongjit (Thailand) Savitree Amitrapai	21	21
(Hong Kong) Lo Lok Kei (Hong Kong) Chan Hung Yung	12	18
(Indonesia) Riky Widianto (Indonesia) Shendy Puspa Irawati	21	21
7	(China) Xu Chen (China) Ma Jin	18	18
(Indonesia) Tri Kusmawardana (Indonesia) Nadya Melati	21	17	21
(Malaysia) Ong Jian Guo (Malaysia) Chong Sook Chin	17	21	23
(South Korea) Kwon Yi-goo (South Korea) Kim Ha-na	21	20	10
2	(Thailand) Songphon Anugritayawon (Thailand) Kunchala Voravichitchaikul	18	22	21

Second Round
(Thailand) Maneepong Jongjit (Thailand) Savitree Amitrapai	21	21
(Indonesia) Riky Widianto (Indonesia) Shendy Puspa Irawati	18	18
(Malaysia) Ong Jian Guo (Malaysia) Chong Sook Chin	13	15
2	(Thailand) Songphon Anugritayawon (Thailand) Kunchala Voravichitchaikul	21	21

Quarterfinals
(Thailand) Maneepong Jongjit (Thailand) Savitree Amitrapai	11	15
2	(Thailand) Songphon Anugritayawon (Thailand) Kunchala Voravichitchaikul	21	21

Preceded by Australian Open	BWF Grand Prix Gold and Grand Prix; 2011 season	Succeeded by Thailand Open
