= 2011 German Open Grand Prix Gold =

Tournament details
- Dates: 2–6 March
- Level: Grand Prix Gold
- Total prize money: US$120,000
- Venue: RWE-Sporthalle
- Location: Mulheim an der Ruhr, Germany

Champions
- Men's singles: (China) Lin Dan
- Women's singles: (China) Liu Xin
- Men's doubles: (South Korea) Jung Jae-sung (South Korea) Lee Yong-dae
- Women's doubles: (Japan) Mizuki Fujii (Japan) Reika Kakiiwa
- Mixed doubles: (Scotland) Robert Blair (England) Gabrielle White

The 2011 German Open Grand Prix Gold was a badminton tournament which took place at the RWE-Sporthalle in Mulheim an der Ruhr, Germany on 2–6 March 2011 and had a total purse of $120,000. This is for the first time this tournament was graded as a Grand Prix Gold event, where before rate as Grand Prix event with a total pursue of $80,000.

== Men's singles ==
=== Seeds ===
1. (China) Lin Dan (champion)
2. (China) Chen Jin (final)
3. (Thailand) Boonsak Ponsana (semi-finals)
4. (South Korea) Park Sung-hwan (semi-finals)
5. (Hong Kong) Hu Yun (first round)
6. (Germany) Marc Zwiebler (second round)
7. (South Korea) Son Wan-ho (quarter-finals)
8. (China) Wang Zhengming (third round)
9. (Netherlands) Dicky Palyama (third round)
10. (Japan) Kazushi Yamada (third round)
11. (Japan) Sho Sasaki (withdrew)
12. (France) Brice Leverdez (third round)
13. (Hong Kong) Wong Wing Ki (third round)
14. (Denmark) Hans-Kristian Vittinghus (third round)
15. (Thailand) Tanongsak Saensomboonsuk (second round)
16. (England) Carl Baxter (first round)

=== Finals ===
Quarterfinals
1	(China) Lin Dan	21	21
7	(South Korea) Son Wan-ho	14	15
3	(Thailand) Boonsak Ponsana	22	21
Q	(Japan) Keigo Sonoda	20	8
(Chinese Taipei) Hsu Jen-hao	16	12
4	(South Korea) Park Sung-hwan	21	21
(South Korea) Lee Hyun-il	21	11	14
2	(China) Chen Jin	18	21	21

Semifinals
1	(China) Lin Dan	21	21
3	(Thailand) Boonsak Ponsana	11	11
4	(South Korea) Park Sung-hwan	14	7
2	(China) Chen Jin	21	21

Final
1	(China) Lin Dan	21	21
2	(China) Chen Jin	19	11

=== Top half ===
==== Section 1 ====
First Round
1	(China) Lin D	21	21
(Canada) S Wojcikiewicz	17	17
(Republic of Ireland) S Evans	21	19
(Denmark) K Midtgaard	19	11^{r}
14	(Denmark) H Vittinghus	21	21
(Germany) L Schmidt	17	14
(India) A Sridhar	12	17
(Germany) D Domke	21	21

Second Round
1	(China) Lin D	21	21
(Republic of Ireland) S Evans	11	18
14	(Denmark) H Vittinghus	21	21
(Germany) D Domke	10	15

Third Round
1	(China) Lin D	21	21
14	(Denmark) H Vittinghus	9	11

==== Section 2 ====
First Round
7	(South Korea) Son W-h	21	21
Q	(Germany) H Käsbauer	14	16
Q	(Italy) T H Akbar	21	16	21
(Portugal) P Martins	18	21	11
9	(Netherlands) D Palyama	21	21
PFQ	(Bulgaria) S Makarski	15	11
(Israel) M Zilberman	21	15	21
Q	(Bulgaria) P Boichinov	14	21	15

Second Round
7	(South Korea) Son W-h	21	21
Q	(Italy) T H Akbar	19	15
9	(Netherlands) D Palyama	16	21	21
(Israel) M Zilberman	21	18	6

Third Round
7	(South Korea) Son W-h	21	21
9	(Netherlands) D Palyama	17	17

==== Section 3 ====
First Round
3	(Thailand) B Ponsana	21	20	21
(France) M L Y Ping	19	22	8
(Ukraine) D Zavadskyi	18	21	18
(Japan) T Ueda	21	15	21
10	(Japan) K Yamada	23	23
(Finland) V Lång	21	21
(Germany) S E Kastens	21	21
Q	(Germany) F Hammes	7	12

Second Round
3	(Thailand) B Ponsana	21	21
(Japan) T Ueda	16	17
10	(Japan) K Yamada	21	21
(Germany) S E Kastens	15	17

Third Round
3	(Thailand) B Ponsana	21	21
10	(Japan) K Yamada	13	12

==== Section 4 ====
First Round
5	(Hong Kong) Hu Y	14	18
(Russia) S Pukhov	21	21
(Sweden) M Sahlberg	14	22	21
(Lithuania) K Navickas	21	20	13
16	(England) C Baxter	11	9
Q	(Japan) K Sonoda	21	21
(India) A Jayaram	15	21	21
(Malaysia) Liew D	21	18	18

Second Round
(Russia) S Pukhov	21	21
(Sweden) M Sahlberg	19	14
Q	(Japan) K Sonoda	17	21	21
(India) A Jayaram	21	7	14

Third Round
(Russia) S Pukhov	17	12
Q	(Japan) K Sonoda	21	21

=== Bottom half ===
==== Section 1 ====
First Round
PFQ	(Malaysia) Chan K B	11	21	21
(England) H Wright	21	15	18
(Hong Kong) Wei N	21	21
PFQ	(United States) B Seguin	17	12
(Chinese Taipei) Hsu J-h	21	21
(India) A Elango	9	15
(Russia) V Ivanov	17	8
6	(Germany) M Zwiebler	21	21

Second Round
PFQ	(Malaysia) Chan K B	17	18
(Hong Kong) Wei N	21	21
(Chinese Taipei) Hsu J-h	21	21
6	(Germany) M Zwiebler	15	13

Third Round
(Hong Kong) Wei N	17	15
(Chinese Taipei) Hsu J-h	21	21

==== Section 2 ====
First Round
(Italy) W H Putro	21	21
(Belgium) Y Tan	15	16
(Iran) K Mehrabi	18	6
12	(France) B Leverdez	21	21
(Czech Republic) P Koukal	17	21	14
(Netherlands) E Pang	21	17	21
Q	(Sweden) G Ulldahl	9	12
4	(South Korea) Park S-h	21	21

Second Round
(Italy) P H Putro	18	15
12	(France) B Leverdez	21	21
(Netherlands) E Pang	18	17
4	(South Korea) Park S-h	21	21

Third Round
12	(France) B Leverdez	13	15
4	(South Korea) Park S-h	21	21

==== Section 3 ====
First Round
(Sweden) M Wigardt	21	18
(South Korea) Lee H-i	23	21
Q	(Germany) N Persson	18	19
15	(Thailand) T Saensomboonsuk	21	21
(India) A Pawar	21	21
(Russia) I Sozonov	18	17
(Denmark) R Ulsing	15	15
8	(China) Wang ZM	21	21

Second Round
(South Korea) Lee H-i	21	21
15	(Thailand) T Saensomboonsuk	13	11
(India) A Pawar	17	18
8	(China) Wang ZM	21	21

Third Round
(South Korea) Lee H-i	6	21	21
8	(China) Wang ZM	21	17	10

==== Section 4 ====
First Round
(Denmark) C L Thomsen	21	21
(Finland) E Heino	19	17
PFQ	(Hong Kong) Chan Y L	20	21	18
13	(Hong Kong) Wong W K	22	12	21
(Sweden) H Hurskainen	21	16	8
(Hong Kong) Chan Y K	18	21	21
Q	(Malaysia) K Lim	5	5
2	(China) Chen J	21	21

Second Round
(Denmark) C L Thomsen	16	16
13	(Hong Kong) Wong W K	21	21
(Hong Kong) Chan Y K	12	17
2	(China) Chen J	21	21

Third Round
13	(Hong Kong) Wong W K	16	9
2	(China) Chen J	21	21

== Women's singles ==
=== Seeds ===
1. (Germany) Juliane Schenk (quarter-finals)
2. (South Korea) Bae Yeon-ju (first round)
3. (Hong Kong) Yip Pui Yin (first round)
4. (Russia) Ella Diehl (first round)
5. (China) Liu Xin (champion)
6. (Netherlands) Yao Jie (first round)
7. (Bulgaria) Petya Nedelcheva (first round)
8. (Japan) Eriko Hirose (first round)

=== Finals ===
Semifinals
5	(China) Liu Xin	21	21
(South Korea) Sung Ji-hyun	19	16
(Japan) Ayane Kurihara	21	21
(Malaysia) Wong Mew Choo	18	15

Final
5	(China) Liu Xin	21	15	21
(Japan) Ayane Kurihara	13	21	9

=== Top half ===
==== Section 1 ====
First Round
1	(Germany) J Schenk	21	21
Q	(Czech Republic) K Gavnholt	5	12
(South Korea) Kim M-h	20	11
(Thailand) R Intanon	22	21
5	(China) Liu X	21	21
(Hong Kong) Chan T K	5	13
(Japan) S Sato	20	10
Q	(Japan) K Imabeppu	22	21

Second Round
1	(Germany) J Schenk	21	21
(Thailand) R Intanon	17	12
5	(China) Liu X	21	21
Q	(Japan) K Imabeppu	11	13

Quarterfinals
1	(Germany) J Schenk	16	17
5	(China) Liu X	21	21

==== Section 2 ====
First Round
4	(Russia) E Diehl	22	8	6
(Singapore) Fu MT	20	21	21
(Thailand) P Buranaprasertsuk	21	18	17
(Singapore) Chen JY	10	21	21
8	(Japan) E Hirose	17	14
(South Korea) Sung J-h	21	21
Q	(Denmark) K Jørgensen	21	19	21
(Netherlands) J Meulendijks	17	21	19

Second Round
(Singapore) Fu MT	21	21
(Singapore) Chen JY	11	17
(South Korea) Sung J-h	21	21
Q	(Denmark) K Jørgensen	9	11

Quarterfinals
(Singapore) Fu MT	8	21	13
(South Korea) Sung J-h	21	9	21

=== Bottom half ===
==== Section 3 ====
First Round
(Russia) T Bibik	21	23
Q	(Hong Kong) Mong K Y	16	21
(Japan) A Goto	23	21
7	(Bulgaria) P Nedelcheva	21	13
PFQ	(United States) R Wang	13	20
(Japan) A Kurihara	21	22
(Germany) O Konon	21	22
3	(Hong Kong) Yip P Y	18	20

Second Round
(Russia) T Bibik	14	19
(Japan) A Goto	21	21
(Japan) A Kurihara	15	21	21
(Germany) O Konon	21	12	16

Quarterfinals
(Japan) A Goto	11	7
(Japan) A Kurihara	21	21

==== Section 4 ====
First Round
(Thailand) S Ponsana	14	18
(Malaysia) Wong M C	21	21
(South Korea) Bae S-h	21	21
6	(Netherlands) Yao J	11	15
(Switzerland) J Cicognini	16	21	12
(Russia) A Prokopenko	21	19	21
(Singapore) Gu J	16	21	21
2	(South Korea) Bae Y-j	21	12	17

Second Round
(Malaysia) Wong M C	21	13	21
(South Korea) Bae S-h	19	21	10
(Russia) A Prokopenko	16	21	21
(Singapore) Gu J	21	19	7

Quarterfinals
(Malaysia) Wong M C	21	21
(Russia) A Prokopenko	11	9

== Men's doubles ==
=== Seeds ===
1. (South Korea) Ko Sung-hyun / Yoo Yeon-seong (semi-finals)
2. (South Korea) Jung Jae-sung / Lee Yong-dae (champions)
3. (Malaysia) Koo Kien Keat / Tan Boon Heong (semi-finals)
4. (Japan) Hirokatsu Hashimoto / Noriyasu Hirata (second round)
5. (Malaysia) Mohd Fairuzizuan Mohd Tazari / Ong Soon Hock (second round)
6. (Germany) Ingo Kindervater / Johannes Schöttler (first round)
7. (Malaysia) Gan Teik Chai / Tan Bin Shen (second round)
8. (England) Chris Adcock / Andrew Ellis (first round)

=== Finals ===
Semifinals
1	(South Korea) Ko Sung-hyun (South Korea) Yoo Yeon-seong	21	15	15
Q	(South Korea) Kim Gi-jung (South Korea) Kim Sa-rang	18	21	21
3	(Malaysia) Koo Kien Keat (Malaysia) Tan Boon Heong	9	11
1	(South Korea) Jung Jae-sung (South Korea) Lee Yong-dae	21	21

Final
Q	(South Korea) Kim Gi-jung (South Korea) Kim Sa-rang	19	21	11
1	(South Korea) Jung Jae-sung (South Korea) Lee Yong-dae	21	18	21

=== Top half ===
==== Section 1 ====
First Round
1	(South Korea) Ko Sung-hyun (South Korea) Yoo Yeon-seong	21	21
(Thailand) Patipat Chalardchaleam (Thailand) Nipitphon Puangpuapech	11	16
(Netherlands) Ruud Bosch (Netherlands) Koen Ridder	22	21
Q	(England) Anthony Clark (England) Chris Langridge	20	19
8	(England) Chris Adcock (England) Andrew Ellis	21	15	12
(Russia) Vladimir Ivanov (Russia) Ivan Sozonov	15	21	21
(Malaysia) Mohd Zakry Abdul Latif (Malaysia) Hoon Thien How	14	11
(Denmark) Rasmus Bonde (Denmark) Anders Kristiansen	21	21

Second Round
1	(South Korea) Ko Sung-hyun (South Korea) Yoo Yeon-seong	21	21
(Netherlands) Ruud Bosch (Netherlands) Koen Ridder	18	10
(Russia) Vladimir Ivanov (Russia) Ivan Sozonov	24	21	21
(Denmark) Rasmus Bonde (Denmark) Anders Kristiansen	26	14	17

Quarterfinals
1	(South Korea) Ko Sung-hyun (South Korea) Yoo Yeon-seong	21	21
(Russia) Vladimir Ivanov (Russia) Ivan Sozonov	19	13

==== Section 2 ====
First Round
4	(Japan) Hirokatsu Hashimoto (Japan) Noriyasu Hirata	21	21
(Poland) Adam Cwalina (Poland) Michal Logosz	10	19
(Germany) Michael Fuchs (Germany) Oliver Roth	21	21
Q	(Germany) Maurice Niesner (Germany) Till Zander	14	8
5	(Malaysia) Fairuzizuan Tazari (Malaysia) Ong Soon Hock	21	16	21
(France) Baptiste Careme (France) Sylvain Grosjean	10	21	10
(Japan) Yoshiteru Hirobe (Japan) Kenta Kazuno	16	17
Q	(South Korea) Kim Gi-jung (South Korea) Kim Sa-rang	21	21

Second Round
4	(Japan) Hirokatsu Hashimoto (Japan) Noriyasu Hirata	18	21	20
(Germany) Michael Fuchs (Germany) Oliver Roth	21	18	22
5	(Malaysia) Fairuzizuan Tazari (Malaysia) Ong Soon Hock	14	18
Q	(South Korea) Kim Gi-jung (South Korea) Kim Sa-rang	21	21

Quarterfinals
(Germany) Michael Fuchs (Germany) Oliver Roth	21	11
Q	(South Korea) Kim Gi-jung (South Korea) Kim Sa-rang	23	21

=== Bottom half ===
==== Section 3 ====
First Round
(Russia) Vitalij Durkin (Russia) Alexandr Nikolaenko	20	21	21
(Thailand) Songphon Anugritayawon (Thailand) Sudket Prapakamol	22	17	18
(Poland) Lukasz Moren (Poland) Wojciech Szkudlarczyk	12	20
7	(Malaysia) Gan Teik Chai (Malaysia) Tan Bin Shen	21	22
(Scotland) Robert Blair (Indonesia) Flandy Limpele	11	10
(China) Liu Xiaolong (China) Qiu Zihan	21	21
(Japan) Hiroyuki Endo (Japan) Kenichi Hayakawa	14	16
3	(Malaysia) Koo Kien Keat (Malaysia) Tan Boon Heong	21	21

Second Round
(Russia) Vitalij Durkin (Russia) Alexandr Nikolaenko	23	21	21
7	(Malaysia) Gan Teik Chai (Malaysia) Tan Bin Shen	25	16	12
(China) Liu Xiaolong (China) Qiu Zihan	17	13
3	(Malaysia) Koo Kien Keat (Malaysia) Tan Boon Heong	21	21

Quarterfinals
(Russia) Vitalij Durkin (Russia) Alexandr Nikolaenko	16	14
3	(Malaysia) Koo Kien Keat (Malaysia) Tan Boon Heong	21	21

==== Section 4 ====
First Round
Q	(Germany) Steffen Hohenberg (Germany) Gregory Schneider	13	14
(Japan) Naoki Kawamae (Japan) Shoji Sato	21	21
(South Korea) Kwon Yi-goo (South Korea) Shin Baek-cheol	21	21
6	(Germany) Ingo Kindervater (Germany) Johannes Schoettler	17	19
PFQ	(Germany) Peter Kaesbauer (Germany) Josche Zurwonne	21	13	13
PFQ	(Denmark) Mats Bue (Denmark) Anders Skaarup Rasmussen	19	21	21
(Netherlands) Jorrit de Ruiter (Netherlands) Dave Khodabux	17	10
1	(South Korea) Jung Jae-sung (South Korea) Lee Yong-dae	21	21

Second Round
(Japan) Naoki Kawamae (Japan) Shoji Sato	21	13	21
(South Korea) Kwon Yi-goo (South Korea) Shin Baek-cheol	7	21	10
PFQ	(Denmark) Mats Bue (Denmark) Anders Skaarup Rasmussen	10	10
1	(South Korea) Jung Jae-sung (South Korea) Lee Yong-dae	21	21

Quarterfinals
(Japan) Naoki Kawamae (Japan) Shoji Sato	10	13
1	(South Korea) Jung Jae-sung (South Korea) Lee Yong-dae	21	21

== Women's doubles ==
=== Seeds ===
1. (Japan) Miyuki Maeda / Satoko Suetsuna (quarter-finals)
2. (Thailand) Duanganong Aroonkesorn / Kunchala Voravichitchaikul (quarter-finals)
3. (Bulgaria) Petya Nedelcheva / (Russia) Anastasia Russkikh (withdrew)
4. (Russia) Valeri Sorokina / Nina Vislova (quarter-finals)
5. (Japan) Mizuki Fujii / Reika Kakiiwa (champions)
6. (Netherlands) Lotte Jonathans / Paulien van Dooremalen (second round)
7. (Japan) Shizuka Matsuo / Mami Naito (semi-finals)
8. (Germany) Sandra Marinello / Birgit Michels (second round)

=== Finals ===
Semifinals
7	(Japan) Shizuka Matsuo (Japan) Mami Naito	17	24
(South Korea) Ha Jung-eun (South Korea) Kim Min-jung	21	26
5	(Japan) Mizuki Fujii (Japan) Reika Kakiiwa	21	21
(South Korea) Kim Ha-na (South Korea) Kim Min-seo	14	13

Final
(South Korea) Ha Jung-eun (South Korea) Kim Min-jung	6	14
5	(Japan) Mizuki Fujii (Japan) Reika Kakiiwa	21	21

=== Top half ===
==== Section 1 ====
First Round
1	(Japan) Miyuki Maeda (Japan) Satoko Suetsuna	21	21
(Sweden) Emelie Lennartsson (Sweden) Emma Wengberg	11	19
(Hong Kong) Poon Lok Yan (Hong Kong) Tse Ying Suet	21	17	21
(South Korea) Jang Ye-na (South Korea) Jung Kyung-eun	14	21	15
7	(Japan) Shizuka Matsuo (Japan) Mami Naito	21	21
(Netherlands) Selena Piek (Netherlands) Iris Tabeling	13	11
(France) Emilie Lefel (France) Marion Luttmann	15	10
(Japan) Misaki Matsutomo (Japan) Ayaka Takahashi	21	21

Second Round
1	(Japan) Miyuki Maeda (Japan) Satoko Suetsuna	21	21
(Hong Kong) Poon Lok Yan (Hong Kong) Tse Ying Suet	11	18
7	(Japan) Shizuka Matsuo (Japan) Mami Naito	23	21
(Japan) Misaki Matsutomo (Japan) Ayaka Takahashi	21	17

Quarterfinals
1	(Japan) Miyuki Maeda (Japan) Satoko Suetsuna	19	12
7	(Japan) Shizuka Matsuo (Japan) Mami Naito	21	21

==== Section 2 ====
First Round
4	(Russia) Valeri Sorokina (Russia) Nina Vislova	14	21	21
(Malaysia) Marylen Ng (Malaysia) Woon Khe Wei	21	13	19
Q	(Hong Kong) Chan Hung Yung (Hong Kong) Mong Kwan Yi	21	21
Q	(France) Julie Delaune (France) Teshana Vignes Waran	13	15
8	(Germany) Sandra Marinello (Germany) Birgit Michels	21	21
(Thailand) Savitree Amitapai (Thailand) Nessara Somsri	17	17
(Singapore) Fu Mingtian (Singapore) Gu Juan	6	10
(South Korea) Ha Jung-eun (South Korea) Kim Min-jung	21	21

Second Round
4	(Russia) Valeri Sorokina (Russia) Nina Vislova	21	21
Q	(Hong Kong) Chan Hung Yung (Hong Kong) Mong Kwan Yi	4	14
8	(Germany) Sandra Marinello (Germany) Birgit Michels	15	17
(South Korea) Ha Jung-eun (South Korea) Kim Min-jung	21	21

Quarterfinals
4	(Russia) Valeri Sorokina (Russia) Nina Vislova	21	19	20
(South Korea) Ha Jung-eun (South Korea) Kim Min-jung	18	21	22

=== Bottom half ===
==== Section 3 ====
First Round
(Denmark) Maria Helsbol (Denmark) Anne Skelbaek	21	21
Q	(Netherlands) Samantha Barning (Netherlands) Ilse Vaessen	15	19
(United States) Iris Wang (United States) Rena Wang	9	6
5	(Japan) Mizuki Fujii (Japan) Reika Kakiiwa	21	21
(England) Mariana Agathangelou (England) Heather Olver	21	19	21
(Germany) Johanna Goliszewski (Germany) Carla Nelte	19	21	17
Q	(Germany) Kim Buss (Germany) Claudia Vogelgsang	12	14
PFQ	(Indonesia) Vita Marissa (Switzerland) Cynthia Tuwankotta	21	21

Second Round
(Denmark) Maria Helsbol (Denmark) Anne Skelbaek	15	16
5	(Japan) Mizuki Fujii (Japan) Reika Kakiiwa	21	21
(England) Mariana Agathangelou (England) Heather Olver	19	18
PFQ	(Indonesia) Vita Marissa (Switzerland) Cynthia Tuwankotta	21	21

Quarterfinals
5	(Japan) Mizuki Fujii (Japan) Reika Kakiiwa	22	21
PFQ	(Indonesia) Vita Marissa (Switzerland) Cynthia Tuwankotta	20	13

==== Section 4 ====
First Round
(Germany) Carola Bott (Germany) Karin Schnaase	10	11
(South Korea) Kim Ha-na (South Korea) Kim Min-seo	21	21
(Australia) Leanne Choo (Australia) Renuga Veeran	18	21	17
6	(Netherlands) Lotte Jonathans (Netherlands) Paulien van Dooremalen	21	18	21
(Sweden) Sanne Ekberg (Sweden) Amanda Hogstrom	16	21	19
(Malaysia) Vivian Hoo Kah Mun (Malaysia) Lim Yin Loo	21	17	21
(Belgium) Steffi Annys (Belgium) Severine Corvilain	13	11
2	(Thailand) Duanganong Aroonkesorn (Thailand) Kunchala Voravichitchaikul	21	21

Second Round
(South Korea) Kim Ha-na (South Korea) Kim Min-seo	21	21
6	(Netherlands) Lotte Jonathans (Netherlands) Paulien van Dooremalen	17	13
(Malaysia) Vivian Hoo Kah Mun (Malaysia) Lim Yin Loo	10	17
2	(Thailand) Duanganong Aroonkesorn (Thailand) Kunchala Voravichitchaikul	21	21

Quarterfinals
(South Korea) Kim Ha-na (South Korea) Kim Min-seo	21	21
2	(Thailand) Duanganong Aroonkesorn (Thailand) Kunchala Voravichitchaikul	19	10

== Mixed doubles ==
=== Seeds ===
1. (Thailand) Sudket Prapakamol / Saralee Thungthongkam (first round)
2. (Poland) Robert Mateusiak / Nadieżda Zięba (quarter-finals)
3. (Thailand) Songphon Anugritayawon / Kunchala Voravichitchaikul (semi-finals)
4. (Germany) Michael Fuchs / Birgit Michels (first round)
5. (South Korea) Yoo Yeon-seong / Kim Min-jung (first round)
6. (Scotland) Robert Blair / (England) Gabrielle White (champions)
7. (England) Chris Adcock / (Scotland) Imogen Bankier (semi-finals)
8. (Ukraine) Valeriy Atrashchenkov / Elena Prus (withdrew)

=== Finals ===
Semifinals
6	(Scotland) Robert Blair (England) Gabrielle White	21	21
7	(England) Chris Adcock (Scotland) Imogen Bankier	17	17
3	(Thailand) Songphon Anugritayawon (Thailand) Kunchala Voravichitchaikul	19	17
(Japan) Shintaro Ikeda (Japan) Reiko Shiota	21	21

Final
6	(Scotland) Robert Blair (England) Gabrielle White	16	21	21
(Japan) Shintaro Ikeda (Japan) Reiko Shiota	21	16	15

=== Top half ===
==== Section 1 ====
First Round
1	(Thailand) Sudket Prapakamol (Thailand) Saralee Thoungthongkam	21	16	15
(Russia) Alexandr Nikolaenko (Russia) Valeri Sorokina	19	21	21
(Netherlands) Dave Khodabux (Netherlands) Samantha Barning	21	21
PFQ	(France) Sebastien Bourbon (France) Julie Delaune	10	13
6	(Scotland) Robert Blair (England) Gabrielle White	21	21
(Japan) Hirokatsu Hashimoto (Japan) Mizuki Fujii	13	17
(Thailand) Nipitphon Puangpuapech (Thailand) Nessara Somsri	21	15	16
Q	(Denmark) Niclas Nohr (Denmark) Lena Grebak	16	21	21

Second Round
(Russia) Alexandr Nikolaenko (Russia) Valeri Sorokina	21	24
(Netherlands) Dave Khodabux (Netherlands) Samantha Barning	10	22
6	(Scotland) Robert Blair (England) Gabrielle White	21	21
Q	(Denmark) Niclas Nohr (Denmark) Lena Grebak	17	16

Quarterfinals
(Russia) Alexandr Nikolaenko (Russia) Valeri Sorokina	17	16
6	(Scotland) Robert Blair (England) Gabrielle White	21	21

==== Section 2 ====
First Round
4	(Germany) Michael Fuchs (Germany) Birgit Michels	17	15
(South Korea) Lee Yong-dae (South Korea) Kim Ha-na	21	21
(Netherlands) Jelle Maas (Netherlands) Iris Tabeling	18	21	19
(Japan) Kenta Kazuno (Japan) Ayaka Takahashi	21	18	21
7	(England) Chris Adcock (Scotland) Imogen Bankier	21	21
(Poland) Wojciech Szkudlarczyk (Poland) Agnieszka Wojtkowska	15	11
(Hong Kong) Wong Wai Hong (Hong Kong) Chau Hoi Wah	18	21	17
Q	(Japan) Kenichi Hayakawa (Japan) Misaki Matsutomo	21	17	21

Second Round
(South Korea) Lee Yong-dae (South Korea) Kim Ha-na	21	21
(Japan) Kenta Kazuno (Japan) Ayaka Takahashi	16	16
7	(England) Chris Adcock (Scotland) Imogen Bankier	21	21
Q	(Japan) Kenichi Hayakawa (Japan) Misaki Matsutomo	17	15

Quarterfinals
(South Korea) Lee Yong-dae (South Korea) Kim Ha-na	19	19
7	(England) Chris Adcock (Scotland) Imogen Bankier	21	21

=== Bottom half ===
==== Section 3 ====
First Round
Q	(Indonesia) Nova Widianto (Indonesia) Vita Marissa	21	21
(Netherlands) Jacco Arends (Netherlands) Selena Piek	19	19
(France) Baptiste Careme (France) Laura Choinet	18	17
PFQ	(England) Robin Middleton (England) Heather Olver	21	21
(Denmark) Anders Skaarup Rasmussen (Denmark) Anne Skelbaek	21	21
(Switzerland) Anthony Dumartheray (Switzerland) Sabrina Jaquet	15	19
(Estonia) Gert Kunka (Sweden) Amanda Hogstrom	22	11	14
3	(Thailand) Songphon Anugritayawon (Thailand) Kunchala Voravichitchaikul	20	21	21

Second Round
Q	(Indonesia) Nova Widianto (Indonesia) Vita Marissa	21	21
PFQ	(England) Robin Middleton (England) Heather Olver	14	18
(Denmark) Anders Skaarup Rasmussen (Denmark) Anne Skelbaek	19	16
3	(Thailand) Songphon Anugritayawon (Thailand) Kunchala Voravichitchaikul	21	21

Quarterfinals
Q	(Indonesia) Nova Widianto (Indonesia) Vita Marissa	19	19
3	(Thailand) Songphon Anugritayawon (Thailand) Kunchala Voravichitchaikul	21	21

==== Section 4 ====
First Round
(Germany) Johannes Schoettler (Germany) Sandra Marinello	21	21
(Bulgaria) Stilian Makarski (Bulgaria) Diana Dimova	16	17
(Japan) Shintaro Ikeda (Japan) Reiko Shiota	21	21
5	(South Korea) Yoo Yeon-seong (South Korea) Kim Min-jung	19	17
(Russia) Vitalij Durkin (Russia) Nina Vislova	9	20
Q	(Japan) Shoji Sato (Japan) Shizuka Matsuo	21	22
(Thailand) Patiphat Chalardchaleam (Thailand) Savitree Amitapai	13	12
2	(Poland) Robert Mateusiak (Poland) Nadiezda Zieba	21	21

Second Round
(Germany) Johannes Schoettler (Germany) Sandra Marinello	14	16
(Japan) Shintaro Ikeda (Japan) Reiko Shiota	21	21
Q	(Japan) Shoji Sato (Japan) Shizuka Matsuo	17	21	10
2	(Poland) Robert Mateusiak (Poland) Nadiezda Zieba	21	9	21

Quarterfinals
(Japan) Shintaro Ikeda (Japan) Reiko Shiota	21	9	21
2	(Poland) Robert Mateusiak (Poland) Nadiezda Zieba	18	21	19

Preceded by India Grand Prix	BWF Grand Prix Gold and Grand Prix; 2011 season	Succeeded by Swiss Open
