= 2011 Swiss Open Grand Prix Gold =

Tournament details
- Dates: 15 – 20 March 2011
- Level: Grand Prix Gold
- Total prize money: US$125,000
- Venue: St. Jakobshalle
- Location: Basel, Switzerland

Champions
- Men's singles: (South Korea) Park Sung-hwan
- Women's singles: (India) Saina Nehwal
- Men's doubles: (South Korea) Ko Sung-hyun (South Korea) Yoo Yeon-seong
- Women's doubles: (South Korea) Ha Jung-eun (South Korea) Kim Min-jung
- Mixed doubles: (Denmark) Joachim Fischer Nielsen (Denmark) Christinna Pedersen

The 2011 Swiss Open Grand Prix Gold was a badminton tournament which took place at the St. Jakobshalle in Basel, Switzerland on 15–20 March 2011 and had a total purse of $125,000. This is the 49th edition of the Swiss Open tournament, rated as a Grand Prix Gold event, where before in 2007–2010 was part of the highest grade tournament BWF Superseries.

== Men's singles ==
=== Seeds ===
1. (Denmark) Jan Ø. Jørgensen (quarter-finals)
2. (Indonesia) Simon Santoso (semi-finals)
3. (England) Rajiv Ouseph (withdrew)
4. (South Korea) Park Sung-hwan (champion)
5. (South Korea) Son Wan-ho (third round)
6. (India) Parupalli Kashyap (first round)
7. (Indonesia) Dionysius Hayom Rumbaka (withdrew)
8. (Netherlands) Dicky Palyama (third round)
9. (Malaysia) Muhammad Hafiz Hashim (third round)
10. (Japan) Kazushi Yamada (third round)
11. (Denmark) Joachim Persson (second round)
12. (Malaysia) Wong Choong Hann (semi-finals)
13. (Japan) Sho Sasaki (quarter-finals)
14. (Poland) Przemyslaw Wacha (withdrew)
15. (France) Brice Leverdez (withdrew)
16. (Denmark) Hans-Kristian Vittinghus (third round)

=== Finals ===
Quarterfinals
1	(Denmark) Jan Ø. Jørgensen	11	15
12	(Malaysia) Wong Choong Hann	21	21
4	(South Korea) Park Sung-hwan	21	21
(India) Ajay Jayaram	19	19
(South Korea) Lee Hyun-il	21	21
(Spain) Pablo Abián	14	12
13	(Japan) Sho Sasaki	17	18
2	(Indonesia) Simon Santoso	21	21

Semifinals
12	(Malaysia) Wong Choong Hann	22	13
4	(South Korea) Park Sung-hwan	24	21
(South Korea) Lee Hyun-il	17	21	21
2	(Indonesia) Simon Santoso	21	10	10

Final
4	(South Korea) Park Sung-hwan	17	21	21
(South Korea) Lee Hyun-il	21	9	17

=== Top half ===
==== Section 1 ====
First Round
1	(Denmark) Jan Ø. Jørgensen	21	21
(Finland) Ville Lang	19	12
Q	(Italy) Taufiq Hidayat Akbar	14	19
(Denmark) Christian Lind Thomsen	21	21
10	(Japan) Kazushi Yamada	21	21
(Italy) Wisnu Haryo Putro	15	14
(Germany) Marcel Reuter	21	21
PFQ	(Bulgaria) Stilian Makarski	10	19

Second Round
1	(Denmark) Jan Ø. Jørgensen	21	21
(Denmark) Christian Lind Thomsen	14	12
10	(Japan) Kazushi Yamada	21	21
(Germany) Marcel Reuter	18	7

Third Round
1	(Denmark) Jan Ø. Jørgensen	20	21	21
14	(Japan) Kazushi Yamada	22	15	9

==== Section 2 ====
First Round
8	(Netherlands) Dicky Palyama	21	21
(Portugal) Pedro Martins	17	10
(France) Mathieu Lo Ying Ping	16	17
(Indonesia) Indra Bagus Ade Chandra	21	21
12	(Malaysia) Wong Choong Hann	21	21
PFQ	(Czech Republic) Jakub Bitman	19	13
(Sweden) Magnus Sahlberg	15	17
(Denmark) Rune Ulsing	21	21

Second Round
8	(Netherlands) Dicky Palyama	17	22	21
(Indonesia) Indra Bagus Ade Chandra	21	20	19
12	(Malaysia) Wong Choong Hann	22	18	21
(Denmark) Rune Ulsing	20	21	6

Third Round
8	(Netherlands) Dicky Palyama	17	7
12	(Malaysia) Wong Choong Hann	21	21

==== Section 3 ====
First Round
4	(South Korea) Park Sung-hwan	21	21
(Spain) Ernesto Velázquez	14	9
(Austria) Michael Lahnsteiner	15	21	21
(Israel) Misha Zilberman	21	16	15
PFQ	(Sweden) Gabriel Ulldahl	18	11
(Malaysia) Tan Chun Seang	21	21
(Russia) Ivan Sozonov	10	23	16
(Chinese Taipei) Hsueh Hsuan-yi	21	21	21

Second Round
4	(South Korea) Park Sung-hwan	21	21
(Austria) Michael Lahnsteiner	16	17
(Malaysia) Tan Chun Seang	21	18	21
(Chinese Taipei) Hsueh Hsuan-yi	17	21	23

Third Round
4	(South Korea) Park Sung-hwan	21	21
(Chinese Taipei) Hsueh Hsuan-yi	18	8

==== Section 4 ====
First Round
PFQ	(Japan) Keigo Sonoda	19	21	10
(India) Ajay Jayaram	21	10	21
(Belgium) Yuhan Tan	22	22
(Indonesia) Sony Dwi Kuncoro	20	20
16	(Denmark) Hans-Kristian Vittinghus	21	21
(Guatemala) Kevin Cordon	11	9
(Denmark) Viktor Axelsen	21	21
(England) Carl Baxter	18	13

Second Round
(India) Ajay Jayaram	21	21
(Belgium) Yuhan Tan	15	13
16	(Denmark) Hans-Kristian Vittinghus	21	16	21
(Denmark) Viktor Axelsen	17	21	16

Third Round
(India) Ajay Jayaram	15	23	21
16	(Denmark) Hans-Kristian Vittinghus	21	21	19

=== Bottom half ===
==== Section 1 ====
First Round
(South Korea) Lee Hyun-il	21	21
(Netherlands) Eric Pang	13	16
Q	(Denmark) Thomas Fynbo	14	17
11	(Denmark) Joachim Persson	21	21
(India) Anand Pawar	21	21
(Finland) Eetu Heino	14	11
Q	(Switzerland) Nicolas Blondel	9	14
5	(South Korea) Son Wan-ho	21	21

Second Round
(South Korea) Lee Hyun-il	21	21
11	(Denmark) Joachim Persson	10	9
(India) Anand Pawar	21	15	18
5	(South Korea) Son Wan-ho	17	21	21

Third Round
(South Korea) Lee Hyun-il	21	16	21
5	(South Korea) Son Wan-ho	12	21	11

==== Section 2 ====
First Round
(Germany) Dieter Domke	21	17	11
(Republic of Ireland) Scott Evans	15	21	21
PFQ	(Czech Republic) Pavel Florián	10	16
9	(Malaysia) Muhammad Hafiz Hashim	21	21
(Spain) Pablo Abián	21	21
(Czech Republic) Petr Koukal	16	12
Q	(Switzerland) Yohannes Hogianto	14	15
PFQ	(Malaysia) Chong Wei Feng	21	21

Second Round
(Republic of Ireland) Scott Evans	21	13	13
9	(Malaysia) Muhammad Hafiz Hashim	19	21	21
(Spain) Pablo Abián	21	21
PFQ	(Malaysia) Chong Wei Feng	19	11

Third Round
9	(Malaysia) Muhammad Hafiz Hashim	11	14
(Spain) Pablo Abián	21	21

==== Section 3 ====
First Round
(Denmark) Peter Mikkelsen	21	21
Q	(Switzerland) Rohanda Agung	9	18
(Sweden) Mattias Wigardt	18	13
13	(Japan) Sho Sasaki	21	21
(Ukraine) Valeriy Atrashchenkov	8^{r}
(Germany) Lukas Schmidt	17
(Germany) Sven Eric Kastens	10	21	21
6	(India) Parupalli Kashyap	21	19	19

Second Round
(Denmark) Peter Mikkelsen	19	14
13	(Japan) Sho Sasaki	21	21
(Germany) Lukas Schmidt
(Germany) Sven Eric Kastens	w	/	o

Third Round
13	(Japan) Sho Sasaki	21	21
(Germany) Sven Eric Kastens	10	16

==== Section 4 ====
First Round
Q	(Switzerland) Hafiz Shaharudin	24	21
Q	(France) Lucas Corvee	22	19
(Sweden) Henri Hurskainen	16	18
PFQ	(Russia) Sergey Ivlev	21	21
(Canada) Stefan Wojcikiewicz	21	21
Q	(Switzerland) Lukas Nussbaumer	11	14
(Denmark) Kristian Midtgaard	9	10
2	(Indonesia) Simon Santoso	21	21

Second Round
Q	(Switzerland) Hafiz Shaharudin	16	18
PFQ	(Russia) Sergey Ivlev	21	21
(Canada) Stefan Wojcikiewicz	8	15
2	(Indonesia) Simon Santoso	21	21

Third Round
PFQ	(Russia) Sergey Ivlev	17	21
2	(Indonesia) Simon Santoso	21	23

== Women's singles ==
=== Seeds ===
1. (Denmark) Tine Baun (withdrew)
2. (India) Saina Nehwal (champion)
3. (Germany) Juliane Schenk (semi-finals)
4. (South Korea) Bae Yeon-ju (semi-finals)
5. (Russia) Ella Diehl (first round)
6. (Bulgaria) Petya Nedelcheva (quarter-finals)
7. (Netherlands) Yao Jie (second round)
8. (Chinese Taipei) Cheng Shao-chieh (first round)

=== Finals ===
Semifinals
(South Korea) Sung Ji-hyun	21	21
3	(Germany) Juliane Schenk	19	12
4	(South Korea) Bae Yeon-ju	19	21	14
2	(India) Saina Nehwal	21	13	21

Final
(South Korea) Sung Ji-hyun	13	14
2	(India) Saina Nehwal	21	21

=== Top half ===
==== Section 1 ====
First Round
PFQ	(Chinese Taipei) Pai Hsiao-ma	21	18	17
(Indonesia) Adrianti Firdasari	16	21	21
(Thailand) Ratchanok Intanon	20	8
(South Korea) Sung Ji-hyun	22	21
5	(Russia) Ella Diehl	9	19
(Chinese Taipei) Tai Tzu-ying	21	21
Q	(Japan) Kaori Imabeppu	21	21
(Russia) Tatjana Bibik	9	14

Second Round
(Indonesia) Adrianti Firdasari	13	12
(South Korea) Sung Ji-hyun	21	21
(Chinese Taipei) Tai Tzu-ying	21	21
Q	(Japan) Kaori Imabeppu	18	13

Quarterfinals
(South Korea) Sung Ji-hyun	21	17	21
(Chinese Taipei) Tai Tzu-ying	11	21	10

==== Section 2 ====
First Round
3	(Germany) Juliane Schenk	21	21
(Indonesia) Aprilla Yuswandari	12	14
(South Korea) Bae Seung-hee	21	19	21
(Japan) Ai Goto	12	21	13
7	(Netherlands) Yao Jie	21	14	21
(England) Elizabeth Cann	13	21	13
(Bulgaria) Linda Zechiri	14	13
(South Korea) Kim Moon-hi	21	21

Second Round
3	(Germany) Juliane Schenk	21	21
(South Korea) Bae Seung-hee	11	12
7	(Netherlands) Yao Jie	19	21	15
(South Korea) Kim Moon-hi	21	16	21

Quarterfinals
3	(Germany) Juliane Schenk	21	21
(South Korea) Kim Moon-hi	14	17

=== Bottom half ===
==== Section 3 ====
First Round
(Canada) Nicole Grether	13	19
Q	(Spain) Carolina Marin	21	21
(Indonesia) Lindaweni Fanetri	21	16	22
8	(Chinese Taipei) Cheng Shao-chieh	17	21	20
(Switzerland) Jeanine Cicognini	16	14
(Japan) Sayaka Sato	21	21
(Scotland) Susan Egelstaff	21	16	16
4	(South Korea) Bae Yeon-ju	15	21	21

Second Round
Q	(Spain) Carolina Marin	20	20
(Indonesia) Lindaweni Fanetri	22	22
(Japan) Sayaka Sato	12	14
4	(South Korea) Bae Yeon-ju	21	21

Quarterfinals
(Indonesia) Lindaweni Fanetri	13	14
(South Korea) Bae Yeon-ju	21	21

==== Section 4 ====
First Round
(Russia) Anastasia Prokopenko	18	7
Q	(Germany) Karin Schnaase	21	21
(United States) Cee Nantana Ketpura	11	16
6	(Bulgaria) Petya Nedelcheva	21	21
(Japan) Eriko Hirose	21	21
(Netherlands) Judith Meulendijks	17	16
Q	(France) Sashina Vignes Waran	21	9
2	(India) Saina Nehwal	23	21

Second Round
Q	(Germany) Karin Schnaase	12	11
6	(Bulgaria) Petya Nedelcheva	21	21
(Japan) Eriko Hirose	15	21	11
2	(India) Saina Nehwal	21	17	21

Quarterfinals
6	(Bulgaria) Petya Nedelcheva	20	17
2	(India) Saina Nehwal	22	21

== Men's doubles ==
=== Seeds ===
1. (Denmark) Mathias Boe / Carsten Mogensen (second round)
2. (South Korea) Ko Sung-hyun / Yoo Yeon-seong (champions)
3. (South Korea) Jung Jae-sung / Lee Yong-dae (final)
4. (Chinese Taipei) Fang Chieh-min / Lee Sheng-mu (semi-finals)
5. (Indonesia) Mohammad Ahsan / Bona Septano (quarter-finals)
6. (Denmark) Mads Conrad-Petersen / Jonas Rasmussen (second round)
7. (Indonesia) Alvent Yulianto Chandra / Hendra Aprida Gunawan (semi-finals)
8. (Germany) Ingo Kindervater / Johannes Schöttler (quarter-finals)

=== Finals ===
Semifinals
7	(Indonesia) Alvent Yulianto Chandra (Indonesia) Hendra Aprida Gunawan	12	15
3	(South Korea) Jung Jae-sung (South Korea) Lee Yong-dae	21	21
4	(Chinese Taipei) Fang Chieh-min (Chinese Taipei) Lee Sheng-mu	21	24	17
2	(South Korea) Ko Sung-hyun (South Korea) Yoo Yeon-seong	15	26	21

Final
3	(South Korea) Jung Jae-sung (South Korea) Lee Yong-dae	17	16
2	(South Korea) Ko Sung-hyun (South Korea) Yoo Yeon-seong	21	21

=== Top half ===
==== Section 1 ====
First Round
1	(Denmark) Mathias Boe (Denmark) Carsten Mogensen	21	21
(Poland) Lukasz Moren (Poland) Wojciech Szkudlarczyk	16	13
(Netherlands) Ruud Bosch (Netherlands) Koen Ridder	16	21	21
PFQ	(Germany) Peter Kaesbauer (Germany) Josche Zurwonne	21	16	19
7	(Indonesia) Alvent Yulianto Chandra (Indonesia) Hendra Aprida Gunawan	21	21
(Chinese Taipei) Chen Hung-ling (Chinese Taipei) Lin Yu-lang	15	16
(Singapore) Hendri Kurniawan Saputra (Singapore) Chayut Triyachart	17	21	21
Q	(Russia) Evgenij Dremin (Russia) Sergey Lunev	21	13	16

Second Round
1	(Denmark) Mathias Boe (Denmark) Carsten Mogensen	21	15	19
(Netherlands) Ruud Bosch (Netherlands) Koen Ridder	17	21	21
7	(Indonesia) Alvent Yulianto Chandra (Indonesia) Hendra Aprida Gunawan	21	21
(Singapore) Hendri Kurniawan Saputra (Singapore) Chayut Triyachart	12	14

Quarterfinals
(Netherlands) Ruud Bosch (Netherlands) Koen Ridder	21	15	17
7	(Indonesia) Alvent Yulianto Chandra (Indonesia) Hendra Aprida Gunawan	16	21	21

==== Section 2 ====
First Round
3	(South Korea) Jung Jae-sung (South Korea) Lee Yong-dae	23	21	21
(Japan) Hiroyuki Endo (Japan) Kenichi Hayakawa	25	15	16
Q	(Switzerland) Rohanda Agung (Indonesia) Titon Gustaman	16	21	17
PFQ	(Denmark) Christian John Skovgaard (Denmark) Mads Pieler Kolding	21	12	21
8	(Germany) Ingo Kindervater (Germany) Johannes Schoettler	21	21
Q	(Netherlands) Jacco Arends (Netherlands) Jelle Maas	15	8
(England) Marcus Ellis (England) Peter Mills	10	12
(Malaysia) Chan Peng Soon (Malaysia) Lim Khim Wah	21	21

Second Round
3	(South Korea) Jung Jae-sung (South Korea) Lee Yong-dae	21	21
PFQ	(Denmark) Christian John Skovgaard (Denmark) Mads Pieler Kolding	16	10
8	(Germany) Ingo Kindervater (Germany) Johannes Schoettler	21	21
(Malaysia) Chan Peng Soon (Malaysia) Lim Khim Wah	16	11

Quarterfinals
3	(South Korea) Jung Jae-sung (South Korea) Lee Yong-dae	21	21
8	(Germany) Ingo Kindervater (Germany) Johannes Schoettler	19	14

=== Bottom half ===
==== Section 3 ====
First Round
(Germany) Michael Fuchs (Germany) Oliver Roth	19	16
(India) Rupesh Kumar K. T. (India) Sanave Thomas	21	21
(Malaysia) Mak Hee Chun (Malaysia) Tan Wee Kiong	21	20	14
6	(Denmark) Mads Conrad-Petersen (Denmark) Jonas Rasmussen	19	22	21
(Netherlands) Jorrit de Ruiter (Netherlands) Dave Khodabux	17	14
(France) Baptiste Careme (France) Sylvain Grosjean	21	21
(England) Chris Adcock (England) Andrew Ellis	14	17
4	(Chinese Taipei) Fang Chieh-min (Chinese Taipei) Lee Sheng-mu	21	21

Second Round
(India) Rupesh Kumar K. T. (India) Sanave Thomas	17	21	21
6	(Denmark) Mads Conrad-Petersen (Denmark) Jonas Rasmussen	21	15	15
(France) Baptiste Careme (France) Sylvain Grosjean	15	16
4	(Chinese Taipei) Fang Chieh-min (Chinese Taipei) Lee Sheng-mu	21	21

Quarterfinals
(India) Rupesh Kumar K. T. (India) Sanave Thomas	17	13
4	(Chinese Taipei) Fang Chieh-min (Chinese Taipei) Lee Sheng-mu	21	21

==== Section 4 ====
First Round
(Japan) Yoshiteru Hirobe (Japan) Kenta Kazuno	21'	23'
(Chinese Taipei) Liao Min-chun (Chinese Taipei) Wu Chun-wei	'15	21
(Poland) Adam Cwalina (Poland) Michal Logosz	19	10
5	(Indonesia) Mohammad Ahsan (Indonesia) Bona Septano	21	21
(South Korea) Kwon Yi-goo (South Korea) Shin Baek-cheol	21	5^{r}
(Japan) Naoki Kawamae (Japan) Shoji Sato	16	6
Q	(South Korea) Kim Gi-jung (South Korea) Kim Sa-rang	12	18
2	(South Korea) Ko Sung-hyun (South Korea) Yoo Yeon-seong	21	21

Second Round
(Japan) Yoshiteru Hirobe (Japan) Kenta Kazuno	22	16	14
5	(Indonesia) Mohammad Ahsan (Indonesia) Bona Septano	20	21	21
(Japan) Naoki Kawamae (Japan) Shoji Sato	21	14	19
2	(South Korea) Ko Sung-hyun (South Korea) Yoo Yeon-seong	19	21	21

Quarterfinals
5	(Indonesia) Mohammad Ahsan (Indonesia) Bona Septano	13	18
2	(South Korea) Ko Sung-hyun (South Korea) Yoo Yeon-seong	21	21

== Women's doubles ==
=== Seeds ===
1. (Chinese Taipei) Cheng Wen-hsing / Chien Yu-chin (quarter-finals)
2. (Indonesia) Meiliana Jauhari / Greysia Polii (semi-finals)
3. (Singapore) Shinta Mulia Sari / Yao Lei (second round)
4. (Netherlands) Lotte Jonathans / Paulien van Dooremalen (first round)
5. (Denmark) Christinna Pedersen / Kamilla Rytter Juhl (semi-finals)
6. (Germany) Sandra Marinello / Birgit Michels (second round)
7. (Japan) Shizuka Matsuo / Mami Naito (quarter-finals)
8. (Japan) Rie Eto / Yu Wakita (second round)

=== Finals ===
Semifinals
5	(Denmark) Christinna Pedersen (Denmark) Kamilla Rytter Juhl	13	19
(South Korea) Ha Jung-eun (South Korea) Kim Min-jung	21	21
(South Korea) Jung Kyung-eun (South Korea) Kim Ha-na	21	10	21
2	(Indonesia) Meiliana Jauhari (Indonesia) Greysia Polii	14	21	13

Final
(South Korea) Ha Jung-eun (South Korea) Kim Min-jung	21	21
(South Korea) Jung Kyung-eun (South Korea) Kim Ha-na	12	13

=== Top half ===
==== Section 1 ====
First Round
1	(Chinese Taipei) Cheng Wen-hsing (Chinese Taipei) Chien Yu-chin	21	21
(France) Emilie Lefel (France) Marion Luttmann	13	11
(Japan) Misaki Matsutomo (Japan) Ayaka Takahashi	21	21
(Canada) Nicole Grether (Canada) Charmaine Reid	7	18
5	(Denmark) Christinna Pedersen (Denmark) Kamilla Rytter Juhl	21	21
(Indonesia) Pia Zebadiah Bernadeth (Indonesia) Liliyana Natsir	14	16
(United States) Iris Wang (United States) Rena Wang	21	21
(Switzerland) Sabrina Angehrn (Switzerland) Adeline Kilchenmann	11	6

Second Round
1	(Chinese Taipei) Cheng Wen-hsing (Chinese Taipei) Chien Yu-chin	21	17	21
(Japan) Misaki Matsutomo (Japan) Ayaka Takahashi	15	21	12
5	(Denmark) Christinna Pedersen (Denmark) Kamilla Rytter Juhl	21	21
(United States) Iris Wang (United States) Rena Wang	9	14

Quarterfinals
1	(Chinese Taipei) Cheng Wen-hsing (Chinese Taipei) Chien Yu-chin	17	19
5	(Denmark) Christinna Pedersen (Denmark) Kamilla Rytter Juhl	21	21

==== Section 2 ====
First Round
3	(Singapore) Shinta Mulia Sari (Singapore) Yao Lei	21	21
(France) Julie Delaune (France) Teshana Vignes Waran	6	5
(Netherlands) Selena Piek (Netherlands) Iris Tabeling	21	10	11
(South Korea) Ha Jung-eun (South Korea) Kim Min-jung	19	21	21
7	(Japan) Shizuka Matsuo (Japan) Mami Naito	21	21
(Switzerland) Ornella Dumartheray (Switzerland) Maria Uvarova	2	10
(Germany) Johanna Goliszewski (Germany) Carla Nelte	15	13
(India) Jwala Gutta (India) Ashwini Ponnappa	21	21

Second Round
3	(Singapore) Shinta Mulia Sari (Singapore) Yao Lei	17	12
(South Korea) Ha Jung-eun (South Korea) Kim Min-jung	21	21
7	(Japan) Shizuka Matsuo (Japan) Mami Naito	21	21
(India) Jwala Gutta (India) Ashwini Ponnappa	16	12

Quarterfinals
(South Korea) Ha Jung-eun (South Korea) Kim Min-jung	26	21
(Japan) Shizuka Matsuo (Japan) Mami Naito	24	13

=== Bottom half ===
==== Section 3 ====
First Round
(France) Audrey Fontaine (France) Lea Palermo	12	19
(Chinese Taipei) Hsieh Pei-chen (Chinese Taipei) Wang Pei-rong	21	21
(Switzerland) Marion Gruber (Switzerland) Sanya Herzig	20	18
6	(Germany) Sandra Marinello (Germany) Birgit Michels	22	21
(Chinese Taipei) Chang Hsin-yun (Chinese Taipei) Lai Chia-wen	21	12	16
(Sweden) Emelie Lennartsson (Sweden) Emma Wengberg	18	21	21
(South Korea) Jung Kyung-eun (South Korea) Kim Ha-na	21	21
4	(Netherlands) Lotte Jonathans (Netherlands) Paulien van Dooremalen	15	12

Second Round
(Chinese Taipei) Hsieh Pei-chen (Chinese Taipei) Wang Pei-rong	21	21
6	(Germany) Sandra Marinello (Germany) Birgit Michels	18	15
(Sweden) Emelie Lennartsson (Sweden) Emma Wengberg	12	11
(South Korea) Jung Kyung-eun (South Korea) Kim Ha-na	21	21

Quarterfinals
(Chinese Taipei) Hsieh Pei-chen (Chinese Taipei) Wang Pei-rong	11	21	18
(South Korea) Jung Kyung-eun (South Korea) Kim Ha-na	21	17	21

==== Section 4 ====
First Round
(Germany) Carola Bott (Germany) Karin Schnaase	9	9
(South Korea) Jang Ye-na (South Korea) Kim Min-seo	21	21
(Denmark) Line Damkjær Kruse (Denmark) Marie Roepke	15	14
8	(Japan) Rie Eto (Japan) Yu Wakita	21	21
(Netherlands) Samantha Barning (Netherlands) Ilse Vaessen	16	21	9
(England) Jenny Wallwork (England) Gabrielle White	21	15	21
(Switzerland) Ennia Biedermann (Switzerland) Severine Corvilain	9	11
2	(Indonesia) Meiliana Jauhari (Indonesia) Greysia Polii	21	21

Second Round
(South Korea) Jang Ye-na (South Korea) Kim Min-seo	20	21	21
8	(Japan) Rie Eto (Japan) Yu Wakita	22	18	6
(England) Jenny Wallwork (England) Gabrielle White	14	21	22
2	(Indonesia) Meiliana Jauhari (Indonesia) Greysia Polii	21	19	24

Quarterfinals
(South Korea) Jang Ye-na (South Korea) Kim Min-seo	9	7
2	(Indonesia) Meiliana Jauhari (Indonesia) Greysia Polii	21	21

== Mixed doubles ==
=== Seeds ===
1. (Chinese Taipei) Chen Hung-ling / Cheng Wen-hsing (quarter-finals)
2. (England) Nathan Robertson / Jenny Wallwork (final)
3. (Chinese Taipei) Lee Sheng-mu / Chien Yu-chin (first round)
4. (Denmark) Joachim Fischer Nielsen / Christinna Pedersen (champions)
5. (Indonesia) Tontowi Ahmad / Liliyana Natsir (semi-finals)
6. (Germany) Michael Fuchs / Birgit Michels (second round)
7. (Indonesia) Fran Kurniawan / Pia Zebadiah Bernadeth (first round)
8. (South Korea) Lee Yong-dae / Ha Jung-eun (semi-finals)

=== Finals ===
Semifinals
8	(South Korea) Lee Yong-dae (South Korea) Ha Jung-eun	21	17	20
4	(Denmark) Joachim Fischer Nielsen (Denmark) Christinna Pedersen	15	21	22
5	(Indonesia) Tontowi Ahmad (Indonesia) Liliyana Natsir	12	20
2	(England) Nathan Robertson (England) Jenny Wallwork	21	22

Final
4	(Denmark) Joachim Fischer Nielsen (Denmark) Christinna Pedersen	23	21
2	(England) Nathan Robertson (England) Jenny Wallwork	21	14

=== Top half ===
==== Section 1 ====
First Round
1	(Chinese Taipei) Chen Hung-ling (Chinese Taipei) Cheng Wen-hsing	21	21
(Bulgaria) Stilian Makarski (Bulgaria) Diana Dimova	10	15
(Japan) Shintaro Ikeda (Japan) Reiko Shiota	21	21
Q	(Japan) Kenichi Hayakawa (Japan) Misaki Matsutomo	17	18
8	(South Korea) Lee Yong-dae (South Korea) Ha Jung-eun	21	21
(Poland) Wojciech Szkudlarczyk (Poland) Agnieszka Wojtkowska	10	8
(India) Diju Valiyaveetil (India) Jwala Gutta	21	14	21
(Germany) Johannes Schoettler (Germany) Sandra Marinello	15	21	19

Second Round
1	(Chinese Taipei) Chen Hung-ling (Chinese Taipei) Cheng Wen-hsing	21	20	21
(Japan) Shintaro Ikeda (Japan) Reiko Shiota	12	22	14
8	(South Korea) Lee Yong-dae (South Korea) Ha Jung-eun	21	21
(India) Diju Valiyaveetil (India) Jwala Gutta	14	9

Quarterfinals
1	(Chinese Taipei) Chen Hung-ling (Chinese Taipei) Cheng Wen-hsing	9	5
8	(South Korea) Lee Yong-dae (South Korea) Ha Jung-eun	21	21

==== Section 2 ====
First Round
4	(Denmark) Joachim Fischer Nielsen (Denmark) Christinna Pedersen	21	23
(Chinese Taipei) Fang Chieh-min (Chinese Taipei) Wang Pei-rong	11	21
(Netherlands) Jacco Arends (Netherlands) Selena Piek	13	17
(Scotland) Robert Blair (England) Gabrielle White	21	21
7	(Indonesia) Fran Kurniawan (Indonesia) Pia Zebadiah Bernadeth	16	10
(Malaysia) Ong Jian Guo (Malaysia) Chong Sook Chin	21	21
(England) Chris Adcock (Scotland) Imogen Bankier	21	21
Q	(South Korea) Shin Baek-cheol (South Korea) Kim Ha-na	17	17

Second Round
4	(Denmark) Joachim Fischer Nielsen (Denmark) Christinna Pedersen	23	21
(Scotland) Robert Blair (England) Gabrielle White	21	12
(Malaysia) Ong Jian Guo (Malaysia) Chong Sook Chin	22	21
(England) Chris Adcock (Scotland) Imogen Bankier	20	14

Quarterfinals
4	(Denmark) Joachim Fischer Nielsen (Denmark) Christinna Pedersen	21	13	21
7	(Malaysia) Ong Jian Guo (Malaysia) Chong Sook Chin	16	21	11

=== Bottom half ===
==== Section 3 ====
First Round
(Switzerland) Anthony Dumartheray (Switzerland) Sabrina Jaquet	15	18
(South Korea) Yoo Yeon-seong (South Korea) Kim Min-jung	21	21
(France) Baptiste Careme (France) Laura Choinet	11	12
5	(Indonesia) Tontowi Ahmad (Indonesia) Liliyana Natsir	21	21
(Denmark) Mikkel Delbo Larsen (Denmark) Mie Schjoett-Kristensen	21	22
(Netherlands) Jelle Maas (Netherlands) Iris Tabeling	16	20
(Denmark) Mads Pieler Kolding (Denmark) Julie Houmann	21	22	21
3	(Chinese Taipei) Lee Sheng-mu (Chinese Taipei) Chien Yu-chin	18	24	17

Second Round
(South Korea) Yoo Yeon-seong (South Korea) Kim Min-jung	15	14
5	(Indonesia) Tontowi Ahmad (Indonesia) Liliyana Natsir	21	21
(Denmark) Mikkel Delbo Larsen (Denmark) Mie Schjoett-Kristensen	21	19	18
(Denmark) Mads Pieler Kolding (Denmark) Julie Houmann	16	21	21

Quarterfinals
5	(Indonesia) Tontowi Ahmad (Indonesia) Liliyana Natsir	21	21
(Denmark) Mads Pieler Kolding (Denmark) Julie Houmann	12	11

==== Section 4 ====
First Round
(Malaysia) Chan Peng Soon (Malaysia) Goh Liu Ying	21	21
Q	(Chinese Taipei) Lin Yu-lang (Chinese Taipei) Hsieh Pie-chen	16	11
(Chinese Taipei) Liao Min-chun (Chinese Taipei) Chen Hsiao-huan	21	21	23
6	(Germany) Michael Fuchs (Germany) Birgit Michels	16	23	25
(Singapore) Chayut Triyachart (Singapore) Yao Lei	21	21
(Ukraine) Valeriy Atrashchenkov (Ukraine) Elena Prus	18	5
Q	(Japan) Kenta Kazuno (Japan) Ayaka Takahashi	9	19
2	(England) Nathan Robertson (England) Jenny Wallwork	21	21

Second Round
(Malaysia) Chan Peng Soon (Malaysia) Goh Liu Ying	18	21	21
6	(Germany) Michael Fuchs (Germany) Birgit Michels	21	16	16
(Singapore) Chayut Triyachart (Singapore) Yao Lei	19	16
2	(England) Nathan Robertson (England) Jenny Wallwork	21	21

Quarterfinals
(Malaysia) Chan Peng Soon (Malaysia) Goh Liu Ying	7	21	16
2	(England) Nathan Robertson (England) Jenny Wallwork	21	18	21

Preceded by German Open	BWF Grand Prix Gold and Grand Prix; 2011 season	Succeeded by Australian Open
