= 2011 Thailand Open Grand Prix Gold =

Tournament details
- Dates: 7 – 12 June 2011
- Level: Grand Prix Gold
- Total prize money: US$120,000
- Venue: CU Sport Complex
- Location: Bangkok, Thailand

Champions
- Men's singles: (China) Chen Long
- Women's singles: (China) Li Xuerui
- Men's doubles: (South Korea) Jung Jae-sung (South Korea) Lee Yong-dae
- Women's doubles: (China) Tian Qing (China) Zhao Yunlei
- Mixed doubles: (Chinese Taipei) Lee Sheng-mu (Chinese Taipei) Chien Yu-chin

The 2011 Thailand Open Grand Prix Gold was a badminton tournament which took place at the Chulalongkorn University Sport Complex in Bangkok, Thailand on 7–12 June 2011 and had a total purse of $120,000.

== Men's singles ==
=== Seeds ===
1. (China) Chen Long (champion)
2. (Thailand) Boonsak Ponsana (third round)
3. (South Korea) Park Sung-hwan (semi-finals)
4. (China) Chen Jin (semi-finals)
5. (Germany) Marc Zwiebler (first round)
6. (South Korea) Lee Hyun-il (final)
7. (Hong Kong) Hu Yun (second round)
8. (England) Rajiv Ouseph (first round)
9. (South Korea) Son Wan-ho (first round)
10. (China) Wang Zhengming (quarter-finals)
11. (Indonesia) Tommy Sugiarto (third round)
12. (Hong Kong) Wong Wing Ki (first round)
13. (France) Brice Leverdez (third round)
14. (India) Parupalli Kashyap (quarter-finals)
15. (Netherlands) Dicky Palyama (first round)
16. (Malaysia) Wong Choong Hann (quarter-finals)

=== Finals ===
Quarterfinals
1	(China) Chen Long	21	21
14	(India) Parupalli Kashyap	18	5
3	(South Korea) Park Sung-hwan	16	21	21
(India) Sourabh Verma	21	16	11
16	(Malaysia) Wong Choong Hann	9	7
4	(China) Chen Jin	21	21
6	(South Korea) Lee Hyun-il	18	21	21
10	(China) Wang Zhengming	21	9	9

Semifinals
1	(China) Chen Long	21	21
3	(South Korea) Park Sung-hwan	15	13
4	(China) Chen Jin	21	18	20
6	(South Korea) Lee Hyun-il	18	21	22

Final
1	(China) Chen Long	21	21
6	(South Korea) Lee Hyun-il	8	19

== Women's singles ==
=== Seeds ===
1. (India) Saina Nehwal (quarter-finals)
2. (China) Jiang Yanjiao (final)
3. (South Korea) Bae Yeon-ju (quarter-finals)
4. (Thailand) Porntip Buranaprasertsuk (semi-finals)
5. (Germany) Juliane Schenk (quarter-finals)
6. (Chinese Taipei) Cheng Shao-chieh (semi-finals)
7. (China) Li Xuerui (champion)
8. (South Korea) Sung Ji-hyun (quarter-finals)

=== Finals ===
Semifinals
7	(China) Li Xuerui	21	17	21
4	(Thailand) Porntip Buranaprasertsuk	17	21	13
6	(Chinese Taipei) Cheng Shao-chieh	21	12	14
2	(China) Jiang Yanjiao	10	21	21

Final
7	(China) Li Xuerui	14	21	21
2	(China) Jiang Yanjiao	21	14	14

== Men's doubles ==
=== Seeds ===
1. (South Korea) Jung Jae-sung / Lee Yong-dae (champions)
2. (South Korea) Ko Sung-hyun / Yoo Yeon-seong (semi-finals)
3. (Chinese Taipei) Fang Chieh-min / Lee Sheng-mu (quarter-finals)
4. (Indonesia) Alvent Yulianto Chandra / Hendra Aprida Gunawan (final)
5. (China) Chai Biao / Guo Zhendong (quarter-finals)
6. (South Korea) Cho Gun-woo / Kwon Yi-goo (first round)
7. (Germany) Ingo Kindervater / Johannes Schoettler (quarter-finals)
8. (United States) Howard Bach / Tony Gunawan (semi-finals)

=== Finals ===
Semifinals
1	(South Korea) Jung Jae-sung (South Korea) Lee Yong-dae	21	21
8	(United States) Howard Bach (United States) Tony Gunawan	18	11
4	(Indonesia) Alvent Yulianto Chandra (Indonesia) Hendra Aprida Gunawan	21	21
2	(South Korea) Ko Sung-hyun (South Korea) Yoo Yeon-seong	14	17

Final
1	(South Korea) Jung Jae-sung (South Korea) Lee Yong-dae	24	21
4	(Indonesia) Alvent Yulianto Chandra (Indonesia) Hendra Aprida Gunawan	22	14

== Women's doubles ==
=== Seeds ===
1. (Thailand) Duanganong Aroonkesorn / Kunchala Voravichitchaikul (first round)
2. (Singapore) Shinta Mulia Sari / Yao Lei (first round)
3. (Netherlands) Lotte Jonathans / Paulien van Dooremalen (first round)
4. (Germany) Sandra Marinello / Birgit Michels (second round)
5. (China) Tian Qing / Zhao Yunlei (champions)
6. (South Korea) Ha Jung-eun / Kim Min-jung (second round)
7. (China) Cheng Shu / Bao Yixin (final)
8. (India) Jwala Gutta / Ashwini Ponnappa (first round)

=== Finals ===
Semifinals
(Malaysia) Vivian Hoo (Malaysia) Woon Khe Wei	17	14
7	(China) Cheng Shu (China) Bao Yixin	21	21
(Hong Kong) Poon Lok Yan (Hong Kong) Tse Ying Suet	23	12	15
5	(China) Tian Qing (China) Zhao Yunlei	21	21	21

Final
7	(China) Cheng Shu (China) Bao Yixin	7	8
5	(China) Tian Qing (China) Zhao Yunlei	21	21

== Mixed doubles ==
=== Seeds ===
1. (Thailand) Sudket Prapakamol / Saralee Thoungthongkam (quarter-finals)
2. (Thailand) Songphon Anugritayawon / Kunchala Voravichitchaikul (quarter-finals)
3. (Germany) Michael Fuchs / Birgit Michels (second round)
4. (Chinese Taipei) Lee Sheng-mu / Chien Yu-chin (champions)
5. (China) Xu Chen / Ma Jin (semi-finals)
6. (Malaysia) Chan Peng Soon / Goh Liu Ying (withdrew)
7. (South Korea) Lee Yong-dae / Ha Jung-eun (quarter-finals)
8. (Indonesia) Nova Widianto / Vita Marissa (final)

=== Finals ===
Semifinals
8	(Indonesia) Nova Widianto (Indonesia) Vita Marissa	21	20	21
(South Korea) Shin Baek-cheol (South Korea) Kim Min-jung	17	22	18
4	(Chinese Taipei) Lee Sheng-mu (Chinese Taipei) Chien Yu-chin	17	21	21
5	(China) Xu Chen (China) Ma Jin	21	19	15

Final
8	(Indonesia) Nova Widianto (Indonesia) Vita Marissa	10	21
4	(Chinese Taipei) Lee Sheng-mu (Chinese Taipei) Chien Yu-chin	21	23

Preceded by Malaysia Open	BWF Grand Prix Gold and Grand Prix; 2011 season	Succeeded by Russian Open
