= 2011 Russian Open Grand Prix =

Tournament details
- Dates: 28 June – 3 July 2011
- Level: Grand Prix
- Total prize money: US$50,000
- Venue: Sport Hall Olympic
- Location: Vladivostok, Russia

Champions
- Men's singles: (China) Zhou Wenlong
- Women's singles: (China) Lu Lan
- Men's doubles: (Japan) Naoki Kawamae (Japan) Shoji Sato
- Women's doubles: (Russia) Valeria Sorokina (Russia) Nina Vislova
- Mixed doubles: (Russia) Alexandr Nikolaenko (Russia) Valeria Sorokina

The 2011 Russian Open Grand Prix was a badminton tournament which took place at the Sport Hall Olympic in Vladivostok, Russia on 28 June to 3 July 2011 and had a total purse of $50,000.

== Men's singles ==
=== Seeds ===
1. (Finland) Ville Lång (second round)
2. (Lithuania) Kestutis Navickas (semi-finals)
3. (Chinese Taipei) Hsu Jen-hao (third round)
4. (Singapore) Derek Wong (semi-finals)
5. (Ukraine) Dmytro Zavadsky (third round)
6. (Singapore) Ashton Chen (second round)
7. (Russia) Stanislav Pukhov (quarter-finals)
8. (Austria) Michael Lahnsteiner (withdrew)

=== Finals ===
Quarterfinals
(Singapore) Robin Gonansa	9	12
(China) Zhou Wenlong	21	21
4	(Singapore) Derek Wong	16	21	21
(China) Qiao Bin	21	15	15
(Russia) Vladimir Malkov	17	21	9
(China) Tian Houwei	21	17	21
7	(Russia) Stanislav Pukhov	14	17
2	(Lithuania) Kestutis Navickas	21	21

Semifinals
(China) Zhou Wenlong	21	21
4	(Singapore) Derek Wong	18	18
(China) Tian Houwei	21	17	21
2	(Lithuania) Kestutis Navickas	16	21	12

Final
(China) Zhou Wenlong	21	21
(China) Tian Houwei	18	15

== Women's singles ==
=== Seeds ===
1. (Japan) Sayaka Sato (semi-finals)
2. (Japan) Ai Goto (semi-finals)
3. (China) Lu Lan (champion)
4. (Japan) Ayane Kurihara (quarter-finals)
5. (Russia) Anastasia Prokopenko (second round)
6. (Scotland) Susan Egelstaff (withdrew)
7. (Switzerland) Jeanine Cicognini (quarter-finals)
8. (Russia) Tatjana Bibik (first round)

=== Finals ===
Semifinals
1	(Japan) Sayaka Sato	14	17
3	(China) Lu Lan	21	21
(China) Chen Xiaojia	21	21
2	(Japan) Ai Goto	10	10

Final
3	(China) Lu Lan	20	21	23
(China) Chen Xiaojia	22	15	21

== Men's doubles ==
=== Seeds ===
1. (Japan) Naoki Kawamae / Shoji Sato (champions)
2. (Japan) Hiroyuki Endo / Kenichi Hayakawa (final)
3. (Russia) Vladimir Ivanov / Ivan Sozonov (semi-finals)
4. (Russia) Vitalij Durkin / Alexandr Nikolaenko (semi-finals)

=== Finals ===
Semifinals
1	(Japan) Naoki Kawamae (Japan) Shoji Sato	27	21
3	(Russia) Vladimir Ivanov (Russia) Ivan Sozonov	25	17
4	(Russia) Vitalij Durkin (Russia) Alexandr Nikolaenko	15	15
2	(Japan) Hiroyuki Endo (Japan) Kenichi Hayakawa	21	21

Final
1	(Japan) Naoki Kawamae (Japan) Shoji Sato	21	21
2	(Japan) Hiroyuki Endo (Japan) Kenichi Hayakawa	18	17

== Women's doubles ==
=== Seeds ===
1. (Russia) Valeria Sorokina / Nina Vislova (champions)
2. (Japan) Misaki Matsutomo / Ayaka Takahashi (final)

=== Finals ===
Semifinals
1	(Russia) Valeria Sorokina (Russia) Nina Vislova	24	21	21
(China) Xie Jing (China) Zhong Qianxin	26	16	17
(United States) Iris Wang (United States) Rena Wang	18	14
2	(Japan) Misaki Matsutomo (Japan) Ayaka Takahashi	21	21

Final
1	(Russia) Valeria Sorokina (Russia) Nina Vislova	22	21
2	(Japan) Misaki Matsutomo (Japan) Ayaka Takahashi	20	18

== Mixed doubles ==
=== Seeds ===
1. (Japan) Shintaro Ikeda / Reiko Shiota (final)
2. (Russia) Alexandr Nikolaenko / Valeria Sorokina (champions)
3. (Switzerland) Anthony Dumartheray / Sabrina Jaquet (second round)
4. (Russia) Vitalij Durkin / Nina Vislova (second round)

=== Finals ===
Semifinals
1	(Japan) Shintaro Ikeda (Japan) Reiko Shiota	24	21
(China) Lu Kai (China) Zhong Qianxin	22	12
(Japan) Kenichi Hayakawa (Japan) Misaki Matsutomo	21	18	10
2	(Russia) Alexandr Nikolaenko (Russia) Valeria Sorokina	15	21	21

Final
1	(Japan) Shintaro Ikeda (Japan) Reiko Shiota	18	14
2	(Russia) Alexandr Nikolaenko (Russia) Valeria Sorokina	21	21

Preceded by Thailand Open	BWF Grand Prix Gold and Grand Prix; 2011 season	Succeeded by U.S. Open
