= Naoki Kawamae =

Japanese badminton player

Personal information
- Born: 6 November 1982 (age 44) Nara Prefecture, Japan
- Height: 1.68 m (5 ft 6 in)
- Weight: 62 kg (137 lb)

Sport
- Country: Japan
- Sport: Badminton
- Handedness: Right

Men's doubles
- Highest ranking: 9 (5 April 2012)
- BWF profile
Medal record
Men's badminton
Representing Japan
Thomas Cup
Bronze medal – third place	2010 Kuala Lumpur	Men's team
Bronze medal – third place	2012 Wuhan	Men's team

Naoki Kawamae (川前 直樹, Kawamae Naoki; born 6 November 1982) is a Japanese badminton player from the NTT East team. In 2012, he competed at the London Olympics, but did not advance to the knock-out stage after placing third in the group stage.

== Achievements ==
=== BWF Grand Prix (3 titles, 1 runner-up) ===
The BWF Grand Prix had two levels, the BWF Grand Prix and Grand Prix Gold. It was a series of badminton tournaments sanctioned by the Badminton World Federation (BWF) which was held from 2007 to 2017.

Men's doubles
Year	Tournament	Partner	Opponent	Score	Result	Ref.
2011	Australian Open	(Japan) Shoji Sato	(Japan) Hiroyuki Endo (Japan) Kenichi Hayakawa	17–21, 18–21	(silver) Runner-up	
2011	Russian Open	(Japan) Shoji Sato	(Japan) Hiroyuki Endo (Japan) Kenichi Hayakawa	21–18, 21–17	(gold) Winner	
2011	India Grand Prix Gold	(Japan) Shoji Sato	(Indonesia) Andrei Adistia (Indonesia) Christopher Rusdianto	21–17, 12–21, 23–21	(gold) Winner	
2012	Swiss Open	(Japan) Shoji Sato	(Chinese Taipei) Fang Chieh-min (Chinese Taipei) Lee Sheng-mu	21–13, 21–14	(gold) Winner	

BWF Grand Prix Gold tournament
BWF Grand Prix tournament

=== BWF International Challenge/Series (7 titles, 3 runners-up) ===
Men's singles
Year	Tournament	Opponent	Score	Result
2005	Southern PanAm International	(Japan) Keishi Kawaguchi	9–15, 15–9, 9–15	(silver) Runner-up

Men's doubles
Year	Tournament	Partner	Opponent	Score	Result	Ref.
2004	Canterbury International	(Japan) Yusuke Shinkai	(Japan) Keishi Kawaguchi (Japan) Toru Matsumoto	15–11, 15–4	(gold) Winner	
2004	Western Australia International	(Japan) Yusuke Shinkai	(Japan) Keishi Kawaguchi (Japan) Toru Matsumoto	15–8, 15–12	(gold) Winner	
2008	Osaka International	(Japan) Keishi Kawaguchi	(South Korea) Ko Sung-hyun (South Korea) Kwon Yi-goo	11–21, 16–21	(silver) Runner-up	
2008	Canadian International	(Japan) Keishi Kawaguchi	(United States) Howard Bach (United States) Khankham Malaythong	21–15, 21–15	(gold) Winner	
2009	Estonian International	(Japan) Shoji Sato	(Russia) Andrey Ashmarin (Russia) Anton Ivanov	21–13, 21–9	(gold) Winner	
2009	Swedish International	(Japan) Shoji Sato	(England) Chris Langridge (England) David Lindley	15–21, 21–14, 21–17	(gold) Winner	
2009	Austrian International	(Japan) Shoji Sato	(Japan) Yoshiteru Hirobe (Japan) Hajime Komiyama	21–19, 21–17	(gold) Winner	
2009	Croatian International	(Japan) Shoji Sato	(Denmark) Mads Conrad-Petersen (Denmark) Mads Pieler Kolding	15–21, 19–21	(silver) Runner-up	
2009	Canadian International	(Japan) Shoji Sato	(Canada) Alvin Lau (Canada) Li Chi-Lin	21–15, 21–12	(gold) Winner	

BWF International Challenge tournament
BWF International Series tournament
