= Sho Sasaki =

Japanese badminton player (born 1982)

Shō Sasaki
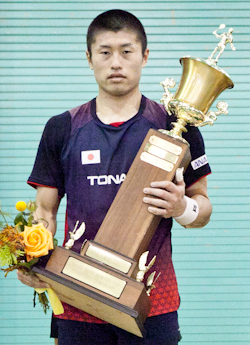

Personal information
- Born: 30 June 1982 (age 44) Hokkaido, Japan
- Height: 1.72 m (5 ft 8 in)
- Weight: 75 kg (165 lb)

Sport
- Country: Japan
- Sport: Badminton
- Handedness: Left
- Coached by: Keita Masuda

Men's singles
- Highest ranking: 6 (3 November 2011)
- BWF profile
Medal record
Men's badminton
Representing Japan
Sudirman Cup
Silver medal – second place	2015 Dongguan	Mixed team
Thomas Cup
Gold medal – first place	2014 New Delhi	Men's team
Bronze medal – third place	2012 Wuhan	Men's team
Bronze medal – third place	2010 Kuala Lumpur	Men's team
Asia Championships
Silver medal – second place	2014 Gimcheon	Men's singles
Bronze medal – third place	2009 Suwon	Men's singles
Asia Team Championships
Silver medal – second place	2016 Hyderabad	Men's team
East Asian Games
Bronze medal – third place	2009 Hong Kong	Men's team

Sho Sasaki (佐々木 翔, Sasaki Shō; born 30 June 1982) is a retired Japanese badminton player from the Tonami Transportation team. He competed in the 2012 London Olympics and the 2016 Rio Olympics. He also participated in four Asian Games from 2002 to 2014.

== Career ==
In 2007, he won the All Japan Badminton Championships in men's singles and 7 international tournaments: the Bahrain Satellite, the Banuinvest International, the Osaka International, the Israel International, the Mauritius International, the Victorian International, and the Italian International. At the 2012 Summer Olympics, he reached the quarter-finals in the men's singles, losing to Lin Dan. In 2016, he did not advance to the knock-out stage after finishing second in the group stage. He beat Petr Koukal of the Czech Republic, but was defeated by Rajiv Ouseph of Great Britain.

In 2017, he announced his retirement from the international badminton. He was ranked as high as No.6 in his career.

== Awards ==
In May 2012 he received the People's Honor Award from Hokuto City, and in 2013, he received a Sports Award at the Toyama Shinbun Culture, Performing Arts and Sports Awards Ceremony.

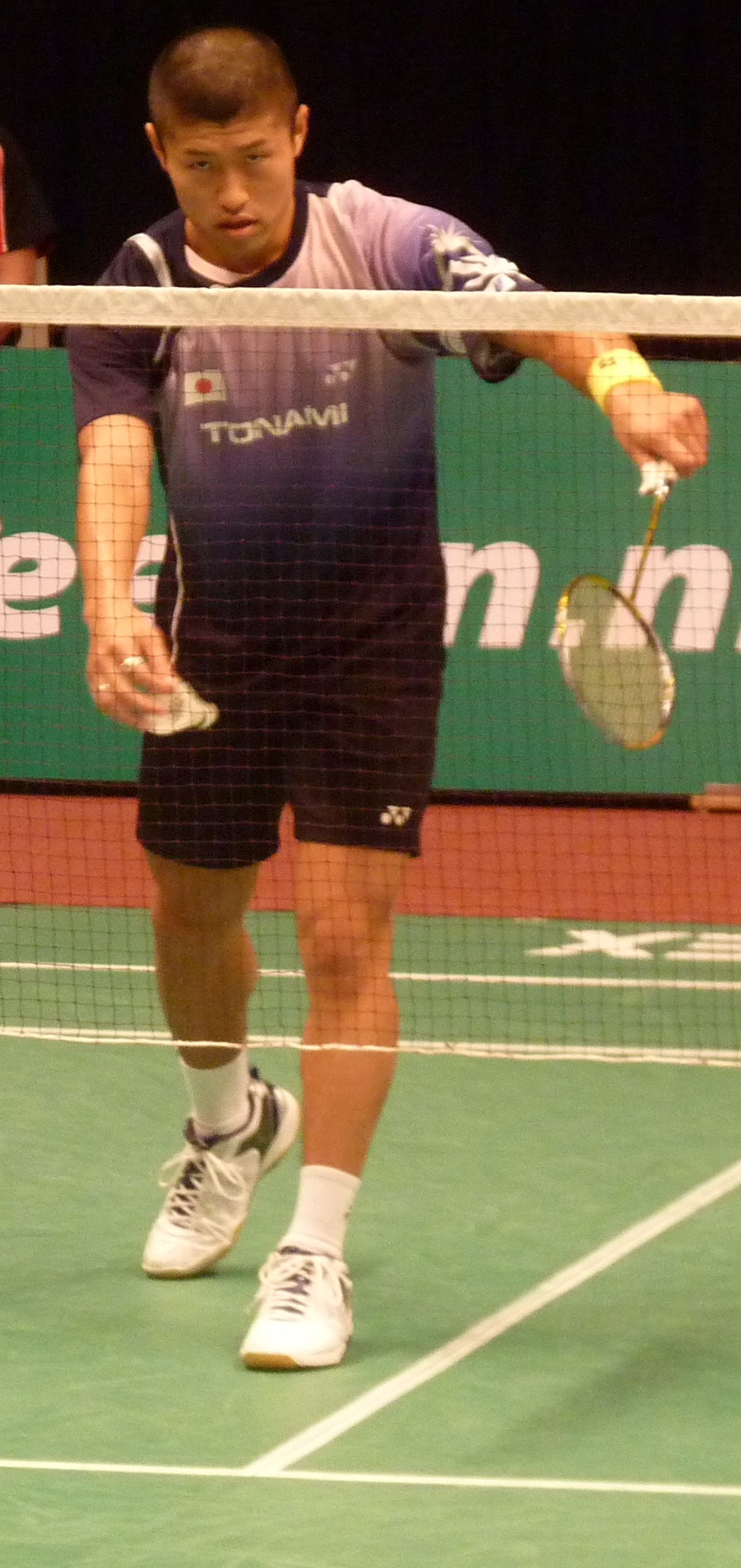
Sho Sasaki at 2010 Dutch Open

== Achievements ==
=== Asia Championships ===
Men's Singles
Year	Venue	Opponent	Score	Result	Ref.
2009	Suwon Indoor Stadium; Suwon, South Korea	(China) Bao Chunlai	20–22, 10–21	Bronze	
2014	Gimcheon Indoor Stadium; Gimcheon, South Korea	(China) Lin Dan	21–14, 9–21, 15–21	Silver	

=== BWF Grand Prix ===
The BWF Grand Prix has two level such as Grand Prix and Grand Prix Gold. It is a series of badminton tournaments, sanctioned by Badminton World Federation (BWF) since 2007.

Men's Singles
Year	Tournament	Opponent	Score	Result	Ref.
2008	German Open	(South Korea) Lee Hyun-il	20–22, 5–21	(silver) Runner-up	
2010	Dutch Open	(India) Ajay Jayaram	21–16, 21–19	(gold) Winner	
2011	Australian Open	(Malaysia) Wong Choong Hann	21–11, 12–21. 21–19	(gold) Winner	
2011	U.S. Open	(Vietnam) Nguyen Tien Minh	21–17, 21–18	(gold) Winner	
2011	Vietnam Open	(Vietnam) Nguyen Tien Minh	13–21, 17–21	(silver) Runner-up	

BWF Grand Prix Gold tournament
BWF Grand Prix tournament

=== BWF International Challenge/Series ===
Men's singles
Year	Tournament	Opponent	Score	Result	Ref.
2001	Cuba International	(Japan) Shōji Satō	10–15, 5–15	(silver) Runner-up	
2002	Nigeria International	(Japan) Shōji Satō	15–7, 15–10	(gold) Winner	
2003	Giraldilla International	(Wales) Richard Vaughan	11–15, 15–6, 15–12	(gold) Winner	
2003	Slovak International	(Japan) Hidetaka Yamada	15–10, 15–13	(gold) Winner	
2007	Bahrain Satellite	(Spain) Pablo Abián	21–10, 21–11	(gold) Winner	
2007	Banuinvest International	(Indonesia) Andre Kurniawan Tedjono	21–8, 21–12	(gold) Winner	
2007	Osaka International	(Japan) Shōji Satō	19–21, 21–14, 21–19	(gold) Winner	
2007	Hatzor International	(Czech Republic) Petr Koukal	21–15, 21–16	(gold) Winner	
2007	Mauritius International	(Denmark) Niels Christian Kaldau	21–10, 21–13	(gold) Winner	
2007	Victorian International	(Japan) Yousuke Nakanishi	21–10, 21–9	(gold) Winner	
2007	Italian International	(Canada) Andrew Dabeka	21–6, 16–21, 21–17	(gold) Winner	
2010	Osaka International	(Japan) Kazushi Yamada	21–14, 21–17	(gold) Winner	

Men's doubles
Year	Tournament	Partner	Opponent	Score	Result
2001	Ten Days of Dawn	(Japan) Shōji Satō	(Iran) Afshin Bozorgzadeh (Iran) Ali Shahhoseini	15–9, 15–12	(gold) Winner
2001	Cuba International	(Japan) Shōji Satō	(Cuba) Reizel Acosta (Cuba) Lázaro Jerez		(gold) Winner

BWF International Challenge tournament
BWF International Series tournament
