= Shōji Satō =

Japanese badminton player (born 1982)

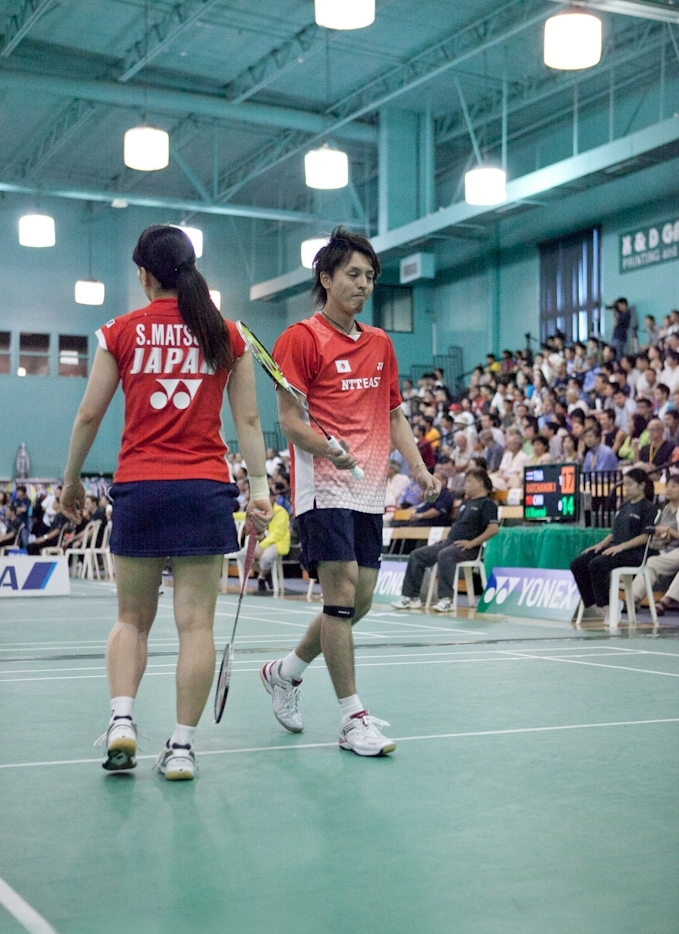
- Shizuka Matsuo and Shoji Sato

Personal information
- Born: 佐藤翔冶; 19 September 1982 (age 44) Higashimurayama, Tokyo, Japan
- Height: 1.68 m (5 ft 6 in)
- Weight: 60 kg (132 lb)

Sport
- Country: Japan
- Sport: Badminton
- Handedness: Right
- Retired: 2012

Men's singles & doubles
- Highest ranking: 9 (MD with Naoki Kawamae 22 March 2012); 12 (XD with Shizuka Matsuo 20 September 2012)
- BWF profile
Medal record
Men's badminton
Representing Japan
Thomas Cup
Bronze medal – third place	2010 Kuala Lumpur	Men's team
Bronze medal – third place	2012 Wuhan	Men's team

Shōji Satō (佐藤 翔冶, Satō Shōji; born 19 September 1982) is a retired Japanese badminton player from NTT East team. He now works as a NTT East singles coach.

== Career ==
Sato started to playing badminton when he was a kid, influenced by his parents who used to playing badminton as a hobby. He then joined Kodaira club when he was in the third grade of elementary school. He won four Japanese National Championships in a row between 2003 and 2006.

Sato made his first appearance at the Olympic Games in 2004 Athens, competed in the men's singles, losing in the round of 32 to Bao Chunlai of China. He also played at the 2008 Beijing Olympics and won the men's singles round of 32 and lost in the round of 16.

Sato also represented Japan as the third singles in the 2010 Thomas Cup held in Kuala Lumpur, Malaysia. He played as the third singles and against Malaysia in the group stage, he shocked the hosts after defeating Muhammad Hafiz Hashim, after the team staged a huge comeback from 0–2 down to win 3–2 over the hosts.

At the 2012 London Olympics, he competed with Naoki Kawamae in the men's doubles.

== Achievements ==
=== BWF Grand Prix ===
The BWF Grand Prix had two levels, the BWF Grand Prix and Grand Prix Gold. It was a series of badminton tournaments sanctioned by the Badminton World Federation (BWF) which was held from 2007 to 2017. The World Badminton Grand Prix has been sanctioned by International Badminton Federation (IBF) from 1983 to 2006.

Men's singles
Year	Tournament	Opponent	Score	Result
2005	Dutch Open	(Malaysia) Muhammad Hafiz Hashim	21–18, 21–17	(silver) Runner-up

Men's doubles
Year	Tournament	Partner	Opponent	Score	Result	Ref.
2011	Australian Open	(Japan) Naoki Kawamae	(Japan) Hiroyuki Endo (Japan) Kenichi Hayakawa	17–21, 18–21	(silver) Runner-up	
2011	Russian Open	(Japan) Naoki Kawamae	(Japan) Hiroyuki Endo (Japan) Kenichi Hayakawa	21–18, 21–17	(gold) Winner	
2011	India Grand Prix Gold	(Japan) Naoki Kawamae	(Indonesia) Andrei Adistia (Indonesia) Christopher Rusdianto	21–17, 12–21, 23–21	(gold) Winner	
2012	Swiss Open	(Japan) Naoki Kawamae	(Chinese Taipei) Fang Chieh-min (Chinese Taipei) Lee Sheng-mu	21–13, 21–14	(gold) Winner	

BWF Grand Prix Gold tournament
BWF Grand Prix tournament

=== BWF International Challenge/Series ===
Men's singles
Year	Tournament	Opponent	Score	Result	Ref.
2001	Ten Days of Dawn	(Iran) Afshin Bozorgzadeh	17–14, 15–2	(gold) Winner	
2001	Cuba International	(Japan) Sho Sasaki	15–10, 15–5	(gold) Winner	
2001	Nigeria International	(Japan) Sho Sasaki	7–15, 10–15	(silver) Runner-up	
2003	Luxembourge Memorial Thierry Theis	(France) Arif Rasidi	15–13, 15–13	(gold) Winner	
2003	Iran Fajr International	(Japan) Yousuke Nakanishi	15–4, 17–14	(gold) Winner	
2003	South Africa International	(Japan) Hidetaka Yamada	11–15, 15–12, 15–7	(gold) Winner	
2003	Wellington International	(Japan) Sho Sasaki	15–4, 17–14	(gold) Winner	
2003	New Zealand International	(Japan) Hidetaka Yamada	3–15, 15–4, 15–1	(gold) Winner	
2003	Australian International	(Japan) Yuichi Ikeda	15–13, 15–9	(gold) Winner	
2003	Bulgarian International	(Germany) Conrad Hückstädt	Walkover	(gold) Winner	
2003	Brazil International	(Japan) Tōru Matsumoto	15–13, 15–4	(gold) Winner	
2003	Slovenian International	(Poland) Przemyslaw Wacha	15–7, 7–15, 15–6	(gold) Winner	
2004	Swedish International	(Germany) Bjorn Joppien	15–9, 15–4	(gold) Winner	
2004	Iran Fajr International	(Chinese Taipei) Chien Yu-hsiu	15–11, 15–11	(gold) Winner	
2004	Peru International	(Japan) Sho Sasaki	Walkover	(silver) Runner-up	
2007	Osaka International	(Japan) Sho Sasaki	21–19, 14–21, 19–21	(silver) Runner-up	
2008	Canadian International	(England) Andrew Smith	21–18, 21–16	(gold) Winner	

Men's doubles
Year	Tournament	Partner	Opponent	Score	Result
2001	Ten Days of Dawn	(Japan) Sho Sasaki	(Iran) Afshin Bozorgzadeh (Iran) Ali Shahhoseini	15–9, 15–12	(gold) Winner
2001	Cuba International	(Japan) Sho Sasaki	(Cuba) Reizel Acosta (Cuba) Lázaro Jerez		(gold) Winner
2002	Nigeria International	(Japan) Yuichi Ikeda	(Nigeria) Dotun Akinsanya (Nigeria) Ocholi Edicha	15–3, 15–1	(gold) Winner
2003	Iran Fajr International	(Japan) Yuichi Ikeda	(Japan) Shuichi Nakao (Japan) Shuichi Sakamoto	4–15, 15–13, 15–5	(gold) Winner
2003	Wellington International	(Japan) Yuichi Ikeda	(New Zealand) John Gordon (New Zealand) Daniel Shirley	5–15, 17–16, 10–15	(silver) Runner-up
2003	New Zealand International	(Japan) Yuichi Ikeda	(Australia) Ashley Brehaut (Australia) Travis Denney	Walkover	(silver) Runner-up
2009	Estonian International	(Japan) Naoki Kawamae	(Russia) Andrey Ashmarin (Russia) Anton Ivanov	21–13, 21–9	(gold) Winner
2009	Swedish International	(Japan) Naoki Kawamae	(England) Chris Langridge (England) David Lindley	15–21, 21–14, 21–17	(gold) Winner
2009	Austrian International	(Japan) Naoki Kawamae	(Japan) Yoshiteru Hirobe (Japan) Hajime Komiyama	21–19, 21–17	(gold) Winner
2009	Croatian International	(Japan) Naoki Kawamae	(Denmark) Mads Conrad-Petersen (Denmark) Mads Pieler Kolding	15–21, 19–21	(silver) Runner-up
2009	Canadian International	(Japan) Naoki Kawamae	(Canada) Alvin Lau (Canada) Li Chi-Lin	21–15, 21–12	(gold) Winner

BWF International Challenge tournament
BWF International Series tournament
