= 2011 Indonesia Super Series Premier =

Tournament details
- Dates: 21–26 June
- Edition: 30th
- Total prize money: US$600,000
- Venue: Istora Gelora Bung Karno
- Location: Jakarta, Indonesia

Champions
- Men's singles: (Malaysia) Lee Chong Wei
- Women's singles: (China) Wang Yihan
- Men's doubles: (China) Cai Yun (China) Fu Haifeng
- Women's doubles: (China) Wang Xiaoli (China) Yu Yang
- Mixed doubles: (China) Zhang Nan (China) Zhao Yunlei

The 2011 Indonesia Open Superseries Premier was the sixth super series tournament of the 2011 BWF Superseries. The tournament was held in Jakarta, Indonesia from 21 to 26 June 2011 and had a total purse of $600,000.

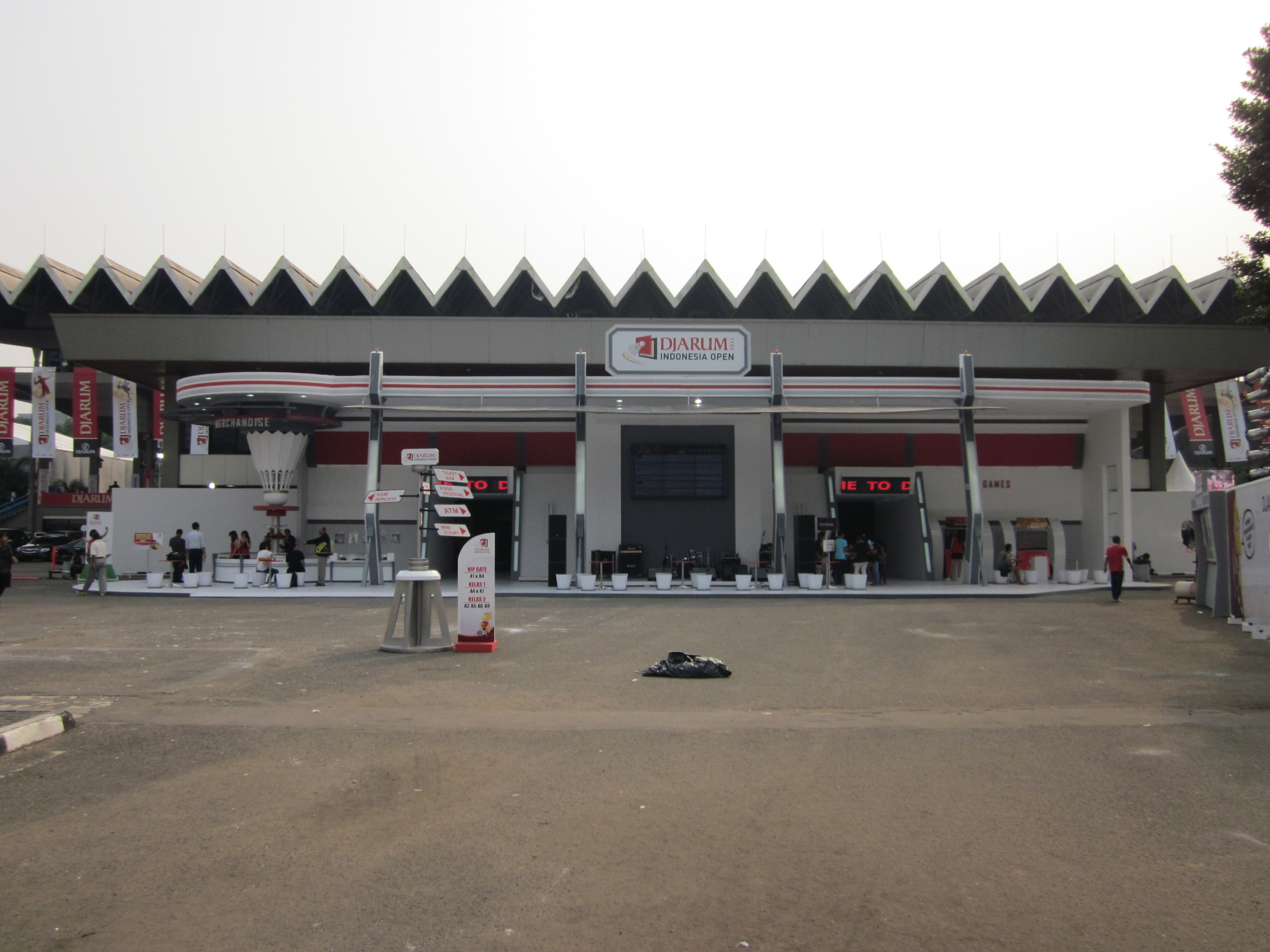
Istora as a venue

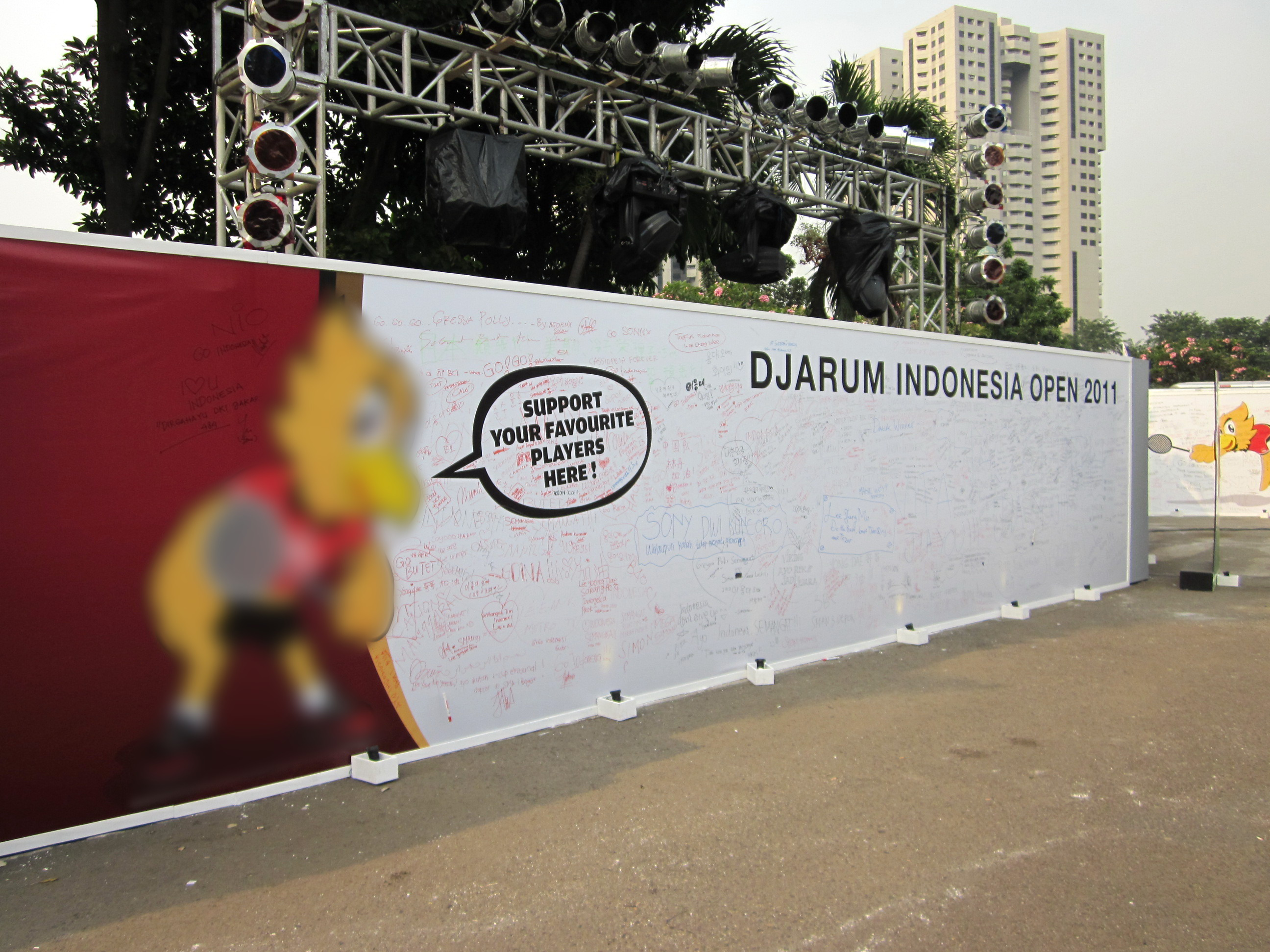
Supporters Wall of Fame

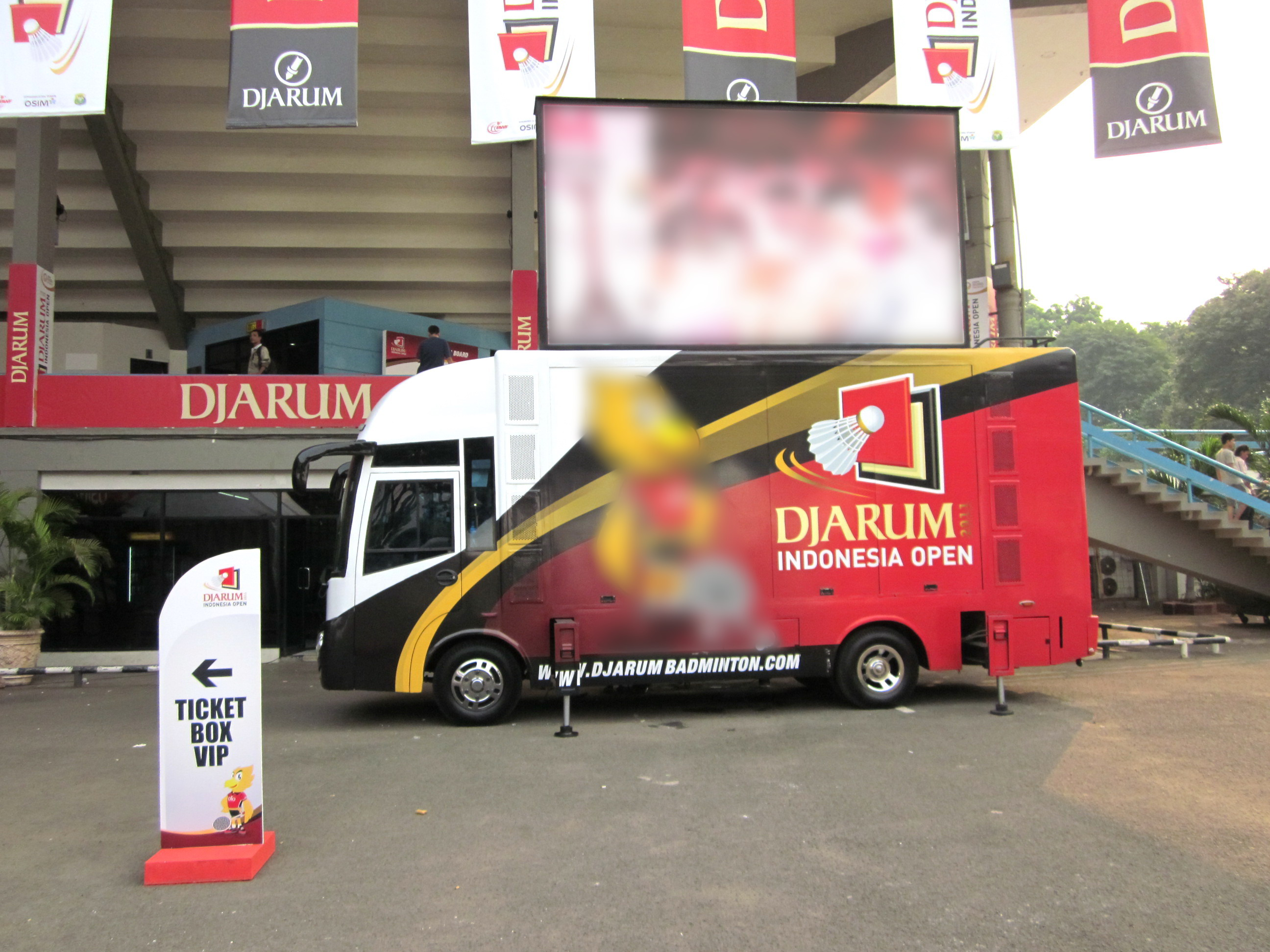
Event mobile mini Jumbotron

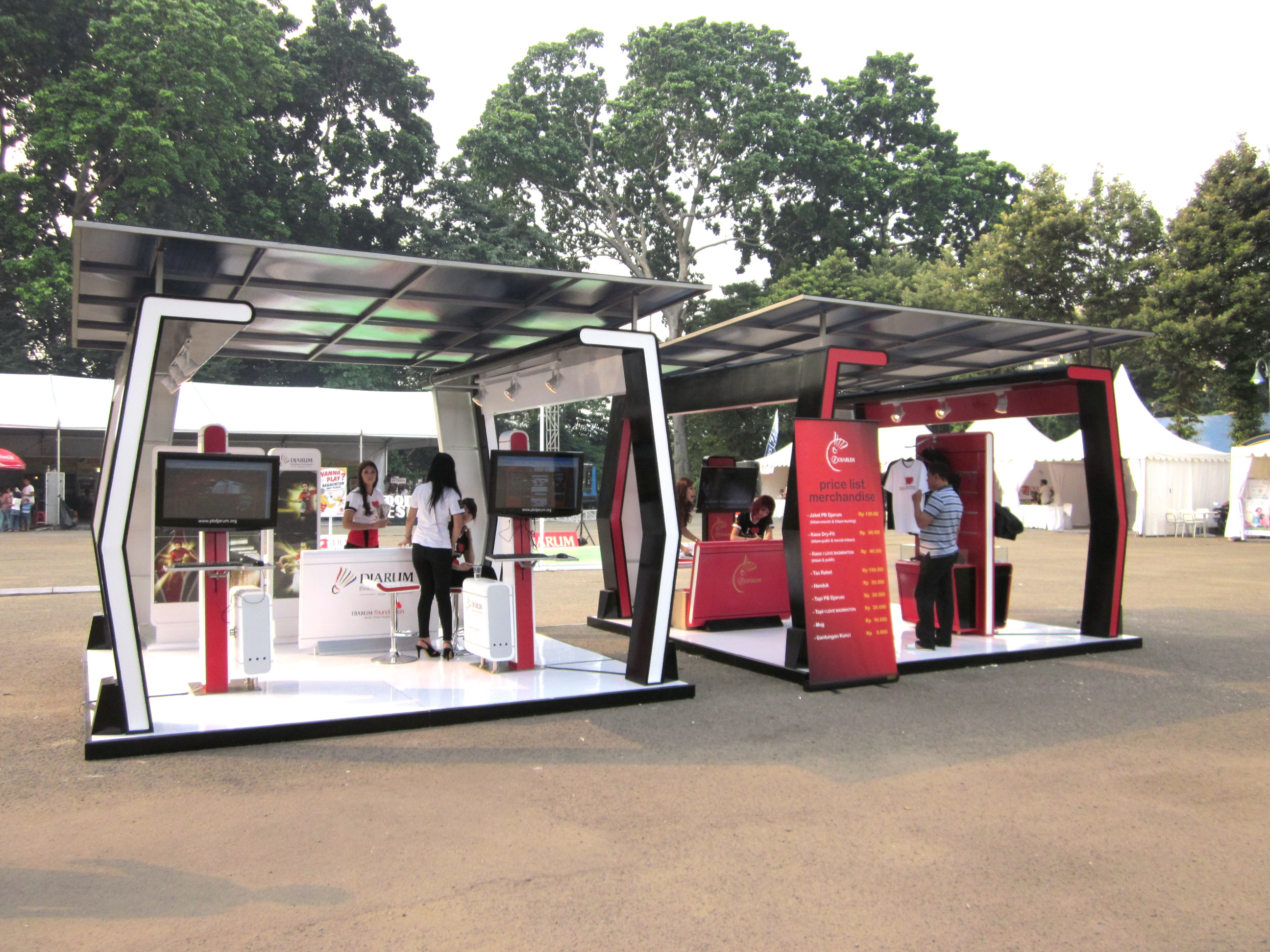
Souvenir & Merchandise booth

== Men's singles ==
=== Seeds ===
1. (Malaysia) Lee Chong Wei (champion)
2. (China) Lin Dan (second round)
3. (Indonesia) Taufik Hidayat (quarter-finals)
4. (China) Chen Long (semi-finals)
5. (Denmark) Peter Gade (final)
6. (Thailand) Boonsak Ponsana (first round)
7. (Vietnam) Nguyễn Tiến Minh (quarter-finals)
8. (South Korea) Park Sung-hwan (second round)

=== Top half ===
First Round
1	(Malaysia) Lee CW	21	21
(Indonesia) T Sugiarto	16	8
(Hong Kong) Wong WK	21	21
(France) B Leverdez	13	8
7	(Vietnam) Nguyễn TM	21	15	21
(South Korea) Lee H-i	15	21	13
(China) Wang ZM	18	21	21
(Germany) M Zwiebler	21	14	17
4	(China) Chen L	21	23
(Denmark) J Ø. Jørgensen	15	21
(Japan) K Tago	19	21	21
Q2	(Thailand) T Saensomboonsuk	21	12	14
6	(Thailand) B Ponsana	8^{r}
(China) Du PY	11
Q3	(Chinese Taipei) Hsueh H-y	16	12
(Japan) K Yamada	21	21

Second Round
1	(Malaysia) Lee CW	21	21
(Hong Kong) Wong WK	17	12
7	(Vietnam) Nguyễn TM	21	25	22
(China) Wang ZM	9	27	20
4	(China) Chen L	21	21
(Japan) K Tago	11	14
(China) Du PY	21	21
(Japan) K Yamada	14	13

Quarterfinals
1	(Malaysia) Lee CW	21	21
7	(Vietnam) Nguyễn TM	10	14
4	(China) Chen L	21	21
(China) Du PY	14	15

Semifinals
1	(Malaysia) Lee CW	21	21
4	(China) Chen L	17	18

=== Bottom half ===
First Round
(South Korea) Shon W-h	17	21	21
(Indonesia) DH Rumbaka	21	14	19
Q4	(India) A Jayaram	22	12
5	(Denmark) P Gade	24	21
(China) Bao CL	21	21
(England) R Ouseph	17	15
Q1	(Malaysia) D Liew	28	23	12
3	(Indonesia) T Hidayat	30	21	21
(China) Chen J	21	21
(Indonesia) S Santoso	9	14
(Hong Kong) Hu Y	19	10
8	(South Korea) Park S-h	21	21
(Japan) S Sasaki	11	21	21
(Denmark) H-K Vittinghus	21	17	18
PFQ	(Indonesia) A Yunus	12	15
2	(China) Lin D	21	21

Second Round
(South Korea) Shon W-h	15	19
5	(Denmark) P Gade	21	21
(China) Bao CL	19	23
3	(Indonesia) T Hidayat	21	25
(China) Chen J	21	21
8	(South Korea) Park S-h	11	18
(Japan) S Sasaki	21	21
2	(China) Lin D	12	18

Quarterfinals
5	(Denmark) P Gade	21	21
3	(Indonesia) T Hidayat	17	15
(China) Chen J	21	12	15
(Japan) S Sasaki	18	21	21

Semifinals
5	(Denmark) P Gade	21	21
(Japan) S Sasaki	11	14

=== Finals ===
Semifinals
1	(Malaysia) Lee Chong Wei	21	21
4	(China) Chen Long	17	18
5	(Denmark) Peter Gade	21	21
(Japan) Sho Sasaki	11	14

Final
1	(Malaysia) Lee Chong Wei	21	21
5	(Denmark) Peter Gade	11	7

== Women's singles ==
=== Seeds ===
1. (China) Wang Shixian (second round)
2. (China) Wang Xin (first round)
3. (China) Wang Yihan (champion)
4. (India) Saina Nehwal (final)
5. (South Korea) Bae Yeon-ju (first round)
6. (China) Jiang Yanjiao (semi-finals)
7. (China) Liu Xin (quarter-finals)
8. (Denmark) Tine Baun (quarter-finals)

=== Top half ===
First Round
1	(China) Wang SX	21	21
(Japan) A Goto	9	17
(France) Pi HY	16	10
(Chinese Taipei) Cheng S-c	21	21
7	(China) Liu X	21	23
(Thailand) P Buranaprasertsuk	16	21
(China) Li XR	21	21
Q1	(Hong Kong) Chan TK	17	13
4	(India) S Nehwal	21	21
(Bulgaria) L Zechiri	12	10
(Ukraine) L Griga	21	19	9
(Bulgaria) P Nedelcheva	17	21	21
8	(Denmark) T Baun	21	19	21
(South Korea) Sung J-h	18	21	12
(Indonesia) MF Kusumastuti	13	19
(Japan) A Kurihara	21	21

Second Round
1	(China) Wang SX	15	17
(Chinese Taipei) Cheng S-c	21	21
7	(China) Liu X	17	21	21
(China) Li XR	21	19	17
4	(India) S Nehwal	21	21
(Bulgaria) P Nedelcheva	18	9
8	(Denmark) T Baun	21	21
(Japan) A Kurihara	12	16

Quarterfinals
(Chinese Taipei) Cheng S-c	21	21
7	(China) Liu X	17	15
4	(India) S Nehwal	21	21
8	(Denmark) T Baun	19	19

Semifinals
(Chinese Taipei) Cheng S-c	14	21	17
4	(India) S Nehwal	21	14	21

=== Bottom half ===
First Round
(Thailand) S Ponsana	19	21	18
(Japan) S Sato	21	16	21
(Germany) J Schenk	15	22	21
5	(South Korea) Bae Y-j	21	20	14
(Hong Kong) Yip PY	21	21
(Netherlands) Yao J	15	16
Q3	(Chinese Taipei) Pai H-m	20	13
3	(China) Wang YH	22	21
Q2	(Indonesia) F Ratnasari	18	21	18
(Thailand) R Inthanon	21	9	21
(Japan) E Hirose	11	11
6	(China) Jiang YJ	21	21
(Singapore) Gu J	21	16	19
Q4	(Indonesia) A Firdasari	19	21	21
(Chinese Taipei) Tai T-y	15	21	21
2	(China) Wang X	21	15	19

Second Round
(Japan) S Sato	11	11
(Germany) J Schenk	21	21
(Hong Kong) Yip PY	21	11
3	(China) Wang YH	23	21
(Thailand) R Inthanon	10	21	17
6	(China) Jiang YJ	21	14	21
Q4	(Indonesia) A Firdasari	19	21	21
(Chinese Taipei) Tai T-y	21	14	14

Quarterfinals
(Germany) Juliane Schenk	21	17
3	(China) Wang YH	23	21
6	(China) Jiang YJ	25	21
Q4	(Indonesia) A Firdasari	23	14

Semifinals
3	(China) Wang YH	21	21
6	(China) Jiang YJ	13	12

=== Finals ===
Semifinals
(Chinese Taipei) Cheng Shao-chieh	14	21	17
4	(India) Saina Nehwal	21	14	21
3	(China) Wang Yihan	21	21
6	(China) Jiang Yanjiao	13	12

Final
4	(India) Saina Nehwal	21	21	14
3	(China) Wang Yihan	12	23	21

== Men's doubles ==
=== Seeds ===
1. (Denmark) Mathias Boe / Carsten Mogensen (quarter-finals)
2. (South Korea) Jung Jae-sung / Lee Yong-dae (second round)
3. (China) Cai Yun / Fu Haifeng (champions)
4. (Malaysia) Koo Kien Keat / Tan Boon Heong (quarter-finals)
5. (South Korea) Ko Sung-hyun / Yoo Yeon-seong (quarter-finals)
6. (Chinese Taipei) Fang Chieh-min / Lee Sheng-mu (second round)
7. (Indonesia) Markis Kido / Hendra Setiawan (semi-finals)
8. (China) Chai Biao / Guo Zhendong (final)

=== Top half ===
First Round
1	(Denmark) M Boe (Denmark) C Mogensen	21	22
(Japan) H Hashimoto (Japan) N Hirata	11	20
Q1	(England) A Clark (England) C Langridge	18	21	21
(India) R Kumar (India) S Thomas	21	17	16
7	(Indonesia) M Kido (Indonesia) H Setiawan	21	21
(Poland) A Cwalina (Poland) M Logosz	10	19
(Japan) Y Hirobe (Japan) K Kazuno	21	19	22
Q4	(China) Hong W (China) Shen Y	16	21	20
3	(China) Cai Y (China) Fu HF	21	15	21
(Indonesia) AY Chandra (Indonesia) HA Gunawan	12	21	14
(South Korea) Cho G-w (South Korea) Kwon Y-g	21	18	24
(Japan) H Endo (Japan) K Hayakawa	17	21	22
5	(South Korea) Ko S-h (South Korea) Yoo Y-s	21	21
(Netherlands) R Bosch (Netherlands) K Ridder	10	11
(Chinese Taipei) Chen H-l (Chinese Taipei) Lin Y-l	21	17	21
(England) C Adcock (England) A Ellis	14	21	18

Second Round
1	(Denmark) M Boe (Denmark) C Mogensen	30	21
Q1	(England) A Clark (England) C Langridge	28	15
7	(Indonesia) M Kido (Indonesia) H Setiawan	21	23
(Japan) Y Hirobe (Japan) K Kazuno	17	21
3	(China) Cai Y (China) Fu HF	21	21
(South Korea) Cho G-w (South Korea) Kwon Y-g	19	9
5	(South Korea) Ko S-h (South Korea) Yoo Y-s	21	21
(Chinese Taipei) Chen H-l (Chinese Taipei) Lin Y-l	12	13

Quarterfinals
1	(Denmark) M Boe (Denmark) C Mogensen	13	20
7	(Indonesia) M Kido (Indonesia) H Setiawan	21	22
3	(China) Cai Y (China) Fu HF	21	21
5	(South Korea) Ko S-h (South Korea) Yoo Y-s	16	19

Semifinals
7	(Indonesia) M Kido (Indonesia) H Setiawan	18	15
3	(China) Cai Y (China) Fu HF	21	21

=== Bottom half ===
First Round
(Indonesia) M Ahsan (Indonesia) B Septano	21	21
(Malaysia) MZ Abdul Latif (Malaysia) Hoon TH	15	17
(Malaysia) MF Mohd Tazari (Malaysia) Ong SH	10	18
6	(Chinese Taipei) Fang C-m (Chinese Taipei) Lee S-m	21	21
(Malaysia) Gan TC (Malaysia) Tan BS	10	19
(Japan) N Kawamae (Japan) S Sato	21	21
(Thailand) S Anugritayawon (Thailand) S Prapakamol	10	7
4	(Malaysia) Koo KK (Malaysia) Tan BH	21	21
(Germany) I Kindervater (Germany) J Schöttler	22	21
(United States) H Bach (United States) T Gunawan	20	15
(Denmark) M Conrad-Petersen (Denmark) J Rasmussen	17	15
8	(China) Chai B (China) Guo ZD	21	21
Q2	(Indonesia) A Pratama (Indonesia) RA Saputro	21	21
Q3	(Indonesia) YR Sugiarto (Indonesia) AY Wirawan	15	15
(China) Liu XL (China) Qiu ZH	19	10
2	(South Korea) Jung J-s (South Korea) Lee Y-d	21	21

Second Round
(Indonesia) M Ahsan (Indonesia) B Septano	21	16	21
6	(Chinese Taipei) Fang C-m (Chinese Taipei) Lee S-m	19	21	12
(Japan) N Kawamae (Japan) S Sato	22	19	18
4	(Malaysia) Koo KK (Malaysia) Tan BH	20	21	21
(Germany) I Kindervater (Germany) J Schöttler	13	13
8	(China) Chai B (China) Guo ZD	21	21
Q2	(Indonesia) A Pratama (Indonesia) RA Saputro	21	21
2	(South Korea) Jung J-s (South Korea) Lee Y-d	17	17

Quarterfinals
(Indonesia) M Ahsan (Indonesia) B Septano	21	21
4	(Malaysia) Koo KK (Malaysia) Tan BH	19	14
8	(China) Chai B (China) Guo ZD	21	21
Q2	(Indonesia) A Pratama (Indonesia) RA Saputro	14	7

Semifinals
(Indonesia) M Ahsan (Indonesia) B Septano	21	11	18
8	(China) Chai B (China) Guo ZD	18	21	21

=== Finals ===
Semifinals
7	(Indonesia) Markis Kido (Indonesia) Hendra Setiawan	18	15
3	(China) Cai Yun (China) Fu Haifeng	21	21
(Indonesia) Mohammad Ahsan (Indonesia) Bona Septano	21	11	18
8	(China) Chai Biao (China) Guo Zhendong	18	21	21

Final
3	(China) Cai Yun (China) Fu Haifeng	21	21
8	(China) Chai Biao (China) Guo Zhendong	13	12

== Women's doubles ==
=== Seeds ===
1. (China) Wang Xiaoli / Yu Yang (champions)
2. (Chinese Taipei) Cheng Wen-hsing / Chien Yu-chin (second round)
3. (Japan) Miyuki Maeda / Satoko Suetsuna (first round)
4. (Japan) Mizuki Fujii / Reika Kakiiwa (semi-finals)
5. (South Korea) Ha Jung-eun / Kim Min-jung (quarter-finals)
6. (Indonesia) Meiliana Jauhari / Greysia Polii (quarter-finals)
7. (Japan) Shizuka Matsuo / Mami Naito (quarter-finals)
8. (Thailand) Duanganong Aroonkesorn / Kunchala Voravichitchaikul (first round)

=== Top half ===
First Round
1	(China) Wang XL (China) Yu Y	21	21
Q3	(Indonesia) K Dewi (Indonesia) J Gozali	11	8
(United States) I Wang (United States) R Wang	21	11	15
Q1	(Indonesia) R Amelia (Indonesia) MD Oktavianti	14	21	21
5	(South Korea) Ha J-e (South Korea) Kim M-j	21	12	21
(Japan) M Matsutomo (Japan) A Takahashi	8	21	12
(Chinese Taipei) Hsieh P-c (Chinese Taipei) Wang P-r	4	14
Q4	(Indonesia) AF Agustin (Indonesia) NK Maheswari	21	21
3	(Japan) M Maeda (Japan) S Suetsuna	13	12
(South Korea) Jung K-e (South Korea) Kim H-n	21	21
(Denmark) C Pedersen (Denmark) K Rytter Juhl	27	21
(South Korea) Jang Y-n (South Korea) Kim M-s	25	18
6	(Indonesia) M Jauhari (Indonesia) G Polii	21	23
(China) Ma J (China) Pan P	15	21
(Netherlands) L Jonathans (Netherlands) P van Dooremalen	17	17
(India) J Gutta (India) A Ponnappa	21	21

Second Round
1	(China) Wang XL (China) Yu Y	21	21
Q1	(Indonesia) R Amelia (Indonesia) M D Oktavianti	7	7
5	(South Korea) Ha J-e (South Korea) Kim M-j	21	21
Q4	(Indonesia) AF Agustin (Indonesia) NK Maheswari	14	12
(South Korea) Jung K-e (South Korea) Kim H-n	16	19
(Denmark) C Pedersen (Denmark) K Rytter Juhl	21	21
6	(Indonesia) M Jauhari (Indonesia) G Polii	22	18	21
(India) J Gutta (India) A Ponnappa	20	21	18

Quarterfinals
1	(China) Wang XL (China) Yu Y	13	21	21
5	(South Korea) Ha J-e (South Korea) Kim M-j	21	10	11
(Denmark) C Pedersen (Denmark) K Rytter Juhl	21	24
6	(Indonesia) M Jauhari (Indonesia) G Polii	15	22

Semifinals
1	(China) Wang XL (China) Yu Y	21	21
(Denmark) C Pedersen (Denmark) K Rytter Juhl	10	12

=== Bottom half ===
First Round
Q2	(Indonesia) G R Imawan (Indonesia) T R Nuraidah	17	8
(Russia) V Sorokina (Russia) N Vislova	21	21
(England) J Wallwork (England) G White	14	17
7	(Japan) S Matsuo (Japan) M Naito	21	21
(Hong Kong) Poon LY (Hong Kong) Tse YS	21	21
(Indonesia) L Nurlita (Thailand) S Thoungthongkam	13	13
PFQ	(Australia) L Choo (Australia) R Veeran	8	12
4	(Japan) M Fujii (Japan) R Kakiiwa	21	21
(Denmark) LD Kruse (Denmark) M Røpke	18	22
(Malaysia) Chin EH (Malaysia) Wong PT	21	24
(Canada) N Grether (Canada) C Reid	w	/	o
8	(Thailand) D Aroonkesorn (Thailand) K Voravichitchaikul
(Indonesia) V Marissa (Indonesia) N Melati	21	21
(Germany) S Marinello (Germany) B Michels	19	19
(Singapore) SM Sari (Singapore) Yao L	14	14
2	(Chinese Taipei) Cheng W-h (Chinese Taipei) Chien Y-c	21	21

Second Round
(Russia) V Sorokina (Russia) N Vislova	13	15
7	(Japan) S Matsuo (Japan) M Naito	21	21
(Hong Kong) Poon LY (Hong Kong) Tse YS	21	12	17
4	(Japan) M Fujii (Japan) R Kakiiwa	13	21	21
(Malaysia) Chin EH (Malaysia) Wong PT	17	21	21
(Canada) N Grether (Canada) C Reid	21	18	13
(Indonesia) V Marissa (Indonesia) N Melati	21	23
2	(Chinese Taipei) Cheng W-h (Chinese Taipei) Chien Y-c	19	21

Quarterfinals
7	(Japan) S Matsuo (Japan) M Naito	21	12	15
4	(Japan) M Fujii (Japan) R Kakiiwa	15	21	21
(Malaysia) Chin EH (Malaysia) Wong PT	17	21	17
(Indonesia) V Marissa (Indonesia) N Melati	21	17	21

Semifinals
4	(Japan) M Fujii (Japan) R Kakiiwa	12	12
(Indonesia) V Marissa (Indonesia) N Melati	21	21

=== Finals ===
Semifinals
1	(China) Wang Xiaoli (China) Yu Yang	21	21
(Denmark) Christinna Pedersen (Denmark) Kamilla Rytter Juhl	10	12
4	(Japan) Mizuki Fujii (Japan) Reika Kakiiwa	12	12
(Indonesia) Vita Marissa (Indonesia) Nadya Melati	21	21

Final
1	(China) Wang Xiaoli (China) Yu Yang	21	21
(Indonesia) Vita Marissa (Indonesia) Nadya Melati	12	10

== Mixed doubles ==
=== Seeds ===
1. (China) Zhang Nan / Zhao Yunlei (champions)
2. (Thailand) Sudket Prapakamol / Saralee Thoungthongkam (quarter-finals)
3. (Denmark) Joachim Fischer Nielsen / Christinna Pedersen (second round)
4. (Indonesia) Tontowi Ahmad / Liliyana Natsir (final)
5. (China) Tao Jiaming / Tian Qing (quarter-finals)
6. (Poland) Robert Mateusiak / Nadieżda Zięba (first round)
7. (Thailand) Songphon Anugritayawon / Kunchala Voravichitchaikul (first round)
8. (Denmark) Thomas Laybourn / Kamilla Rytter Juhl (semi-finals)

=== Top half ===
First Round
1	(China) Zhang N (China) Zhao YL	21	21
(Indonesia) N Widianto (Indonesia) V Marissa	13	15
(Japan) H Hashimoto (Japan) M Fujii	21	13
(England) N Robertson (England) J Wallwork	23	21
5	(China) Tao JM (China) Tian Q	21	21
(Chinese Taipei) Lee S-m (Chinese Taipei) Chien Y-c	19	19
(Russia) A Nikolaenko (Russia) V Sorokina	21	21
(Indonesia) M Kido (Indonesia) L Nurlita	18	12
3	(Denmark) JF Nielsen (Denmark) C Pedersen	21	21
(Hong Kong) Wong WH (Hong Kong) Chau HW	14	16
(Scotland) R Blair (England) G White	14	17
(Chinese Taipei) Chen H-l (Chinese Taipei) Cheng W-h	21	21
7	(Thailand) S Anugritayawon (Thailand) K Voravichitchaikul	3^{r}
(Indonesia) M Rijal (Indonesia) D Susanto	11
PFQ	(South Korea) Kim K-j (South Korea) Jung K-e	13	18
(Indonesia) F Kurniawan (Indonesia) PZ Bernadeth	21	21

Second Round
1	(China) Zhang N (China) Zhao YL	21	21
(England) N Robertson (England) J Wallwork	16	15
5	(China) Tao JM (China) Tian Q	21	21
(Russia) A Nikolaenko (Russia) V Sorokina	12	9
3	(Denmark) J F Nielsen (Denmark) C Pedersen	19	17
(Chinese Taipei) Chen H-l (Chinese Taipei) Cheng W-h	21	21
(Indonesia) M Rijal (Indonesia) D Susanto	14	21	15
(Indonesia) F Kurniawan (Indonesia) PZ Bernadeth	21	19	21

Quarterfinals
1	(China) Zhang N (China) Zhao YL	21	21
5	(China) Tao JM (China) Tian Q	11	16
(Chinese Taipei) Chen H-l (Chinese Taipei) Cheng W-h	21	21
(Indonesia) F Kurniawan (Indonesia) PZ Bernadeth	17	14

Semifinals
1	(China) Zhang N (China) Zhao YL	21	21
(Chinese Taipei) Chen H-l (Chinese Taipei) Cheng W-h	17	17

=== Bottom half ===
First Round
(China) He HB (China) Yu Y	21	21
(Canada) T Ng (Canada) G Gao	12	15
(Japan) S Ikeda (Japan) R Shiota	24	13	21
6	(Poland) R Mateusiak (Poland) N Zięba	22	21	14
(Japan) S Sato (Japan) S Matsuo	24	22
Q1	(Japan) K Kazuno (Japan) A Takahashi	22	20
(South Korea) Lee Y-d (South Korea) Ha J-e	17	14
4	(Indonesia) T Ahmad (Indonesia) L Natsir	21	21
Q3	(Japan) K Hayakawa (Japan) M Matsutomo	21	21
(England) C Adcock (Scotland) I Bankier	19	19
(Germany) J Schöttler (Germany) S Marinello	14	16
8	(Denmark) T Laybourn (Denmark) K Rytter Juhl	21	21
Q4	(Indonesia) I Fadhilah (Indonesia) W Anggraini	18	13
Q2	(South Korea) Cho G-w (South Korea) Kim M-s	21	21
(Germany) M Fuchs (Germany) B Michels	21	19	9
2	(Thailand) S Prapakamol (Thailand) S Thoungthongkam	10	21	21

Second Round
(China) He HB (China) Yu Y	26	16	21
(Japan) S Ikeda (Japan) R Shiota	24	21	12
(Japan) S Sato (Japan) S Matsuo	8	12
4	(Indonesia) T Ahmad (Indonesia) L Natsir	21	21
Q3	(Japan) K Hayakawa (Japan) M Matsutomo	12	10
8	(Denmark) T Laybourn (Denmark) K Rytter Juhl	21	21
Q2	(South Korea) Cho G-w (South Korea) Kim M-s	20	7
2	(Thailand) S Prapakamol (Thailand) S Thoungthongkam	22	21

Quarterfinals
(China) He HB (China) Yu Y	19	22
4	(Indonesia) T Ahmad (Indonesia) L Natsir	21	24
8	(Denmark) T Laybourn (Denmark) K Rytter Juhl	21	16	22
2	(Thailand) S Prapakamol (Thailand) S Thoungthongkam	13	21	20

Semifinals
4	(Indonesia) T Ahmad (Indonesia) L Natsir	21	21
8	(Denmark) T Laybourn (Denmark) K Rytter Juhl	15	14

=== Finals ===
Semifinals
1	(China) Zhang Nan (China) Zhao Yunlei	21	21
(Chinese Taipei) Chen Hung-ling (Chinese Taipei) Cheng Wen-hsing	17	17
4	(Indonesia) Tontowi Ahmad (Indonesia) Liliyana Natsir	21	21
(Denmark) Thomas Laybourn (Denmark) Kamilla Rytter Juhl	15	14

Final
1	(China) Zhang Nan (China) Zhao Yunlei	20	21	21
4	(Indonesia) Tontowi Ahmad (Indonesia) Liliyana Natsir	22	14	9

Preceded by 2010 Indonesia Super Series	Indonesia Super Series	Succeeded by 2012 Indonesia Super Series Premier
Preceded by 2011 Singapore Super Series	BWF Super Series; 2011 season	Succeeded by 2011 China Masters Super Series
