= 2012 Singapore Super Series =

Tournament details
- Dates: 19 June 2012– 24 June 2012
- Edition: 63rd
- Level: Super Series
- Total prize money: US$200,000
- Venue: Singapore Indoor Stadium
- Location: Kallang, Singapore

Champions
- Men's singles: (Thailand) Boonsak Ponsana
- Women's singles: (Germany) Juliane Schenk
- Men's doubles: (Indonesia) Markis Kido (Indonesia) Hendra Setiawan
- Women's doubles: (China) Bao Yixin (China) Zhong Qianxin
- Mixed doubles: (Chinese Taipei) Chen Hung-ling (Chinese Taipei) Cheng Wen-hsing

The 2012 Singapore Super Series is the sixth super series tournament of the 2012 BWF Super Series. The tournament was held in Singapore from 19 to 24 June 2012 and had a total purse of $200,000.

== Men's singles ==
=== Seeds ===
1. (Japan) Sho Sasaki (First round)
2. (South Korea) Lee Hyun-il (Second round)
3. (Japan) Kenichi Tago (Second round)
4. (Indonesia) Simon Santoso (not participated)
5. (China) Du Pengyu (First round)
6. (Vietnam) Nguyen Tien Minh (Semifinal)
7. (Indonesia) Taufik Hidayat (First round)
8. (South Korea) Shon Wan-ho (First round)

=== Top half ===
First Round
1	(Japan) S Sasaki	10	21	12
(Denmark) V Axelsen	21	15	21
Q1	(India) A Pawar	12	21	21
(Guatemala) K Cordón	21	11	19
(Spain) P Abian	21	15	13
(Thailand) T Saensomboonsuk	12	21	21
Q2	(Indonesia) S D Kuncoro	21	21
5	(China) Du PY	9	17
7	(Indonesia) T Hidayat	17	19
(Malaysia) Chong W F	21	21
(India) S Varma	24	12	10
(Hong Kong) Hu Y	22	21	21
(China) Wang ZM	21	29	21
Q3	(Indonesia) A K Tedjono	13	30	15
(Hong Kong) Wong W K	19	14
3	(Japan) K Tago	21	21

Second Round
(Denmark) V Axelsen	21	21
Q1	(India) A Pawar	19	17
(Thailand) T Saensomboonsuk	11	17
Q2	(Indonesia) S D Kuncoro	21	21
(Malaysia) Chong W F	21	21
(Hong Kong) Hu Y	17	14
(China) Wang ZM	17	21	21
3	(Japan) K Tago	21	17	16

Quarterfinals
(Denmark) V Axelsen	21	26
Q2	(Indonesia) S D Kuncoro	17	24
(Malaysia) Chong W F	12	20
(China) Wang ZM	21	22

Semifinals
(Denmark) V Axelsen	13	14
(China) Wang ZM	21	21

=== Bottom half ===
First Round
PFQ	(Singapore) Z L D Wong	12	13
Q4	(India) G Datt	21	21
(Thailand) B Ponsana	10	21	21
(Malaysia) M H Hashim	21	14	18
(Indonesia) D H Rumbaka	23	21
(Chinese Taipei) Hsu J-h	21	16
(Indonesia) T Sugiarto	21	19	21
8	(South Korea) Shon W-h	16	21	15
6	(Vietnam) Nguyen T M	21	21
PFQ	(Netherlands) E Pang	15	18
(France) B Leverdez	12	14
(India) A Jayaram	21	21
(Indonesia) A Yunus	9	22
(Malaysia) Liew DR	21	24
(India) K Parupalli	18	12
2	(South Korea) Lee H-i	21	21

Second Round
Q4	(India) G Datt	12	8
(Thailand) B Ponsana	21	21
(Indonesia) D H Rumbaka	21	21
(Indonesia) T Sugiarto	19	17
6	(Vietnam) Nguyen T M	21	21
(India) A Jayaram	15	14
(Malaysia) Liew DR	21	12	21
2	(South Korea) Lee H-i	18	21	13

Quarterfinals
(Thailand) B Ponsana	21	21	21
(Indonesia) D H Rumbaka	23	7	18
6	(Vietnam) Nguyen T M	14	21	21
(Malaysia) Liew DR	21	11	13

Semifinals
(Thailand) B Ponsana	21	18	21
6	(Vietnam) Nguyen T M	12	21	19

=== Finals ===
Semifinals
(Denmark) Viktor Axelsen	13	14
(China) Wang Zhengming	21	21
(Thailand) Boonsak Ponsana	21	18	21
6	(Vietnam) Nguyen Tien Minh	12	21	19

Final
(China) Wang Zhengming	18	19
(Thailand) Boonsak Ponsana	21	21

== Women's singles ==
=== Seeds ===
1. (China) Jiang Yanjiao
2. (Germany) Juliane Schenk
3. (South Korea) Sung Ji-hyun
4. (Chinese Taipei) Cheng Shao-chieh
5. (Chinese Taipei) Tai Tzu-ying
6. (South Korea) Bae Youn-joo
7. (Japan) Sayaka Sato
8. (Singapore) Gu Juan (First Round)

=== Top half ===
First Round
PFQ	(Malaysia) S Saniru	11	21
Q4	(Singapore) Liang XY	21	21
(Singapore) Xing AY	21	21
(Belgium) L Tan	11	14
PFQ	(France) S V Waran	10
(Italy) A Allegrini	9^{r}
(Hong Kong) Yip P Y	21	21
(Indonesia) M F Kusumastuti	16	17
4	(Chinese Taipei) Cheng S-c	22	21
(China) Han L	20	10
Q2	(Singapore) Chen JY	24	16	21
(Netherlands) Yao J	22	21	15
7	(Japan) S Sato	21	21
Q3	(Russia) A Astrakhantseva	4	3
(Bulgaria) P Nedelcheva	21	14	22
(Indonesia) L Fanetri	11	21	20

Second Round
Q4	(Singapore) Liang XY	19	10
(Singapore) Xing AY	21	21
PFQ	(France) S V Waran	16	9
(Hong Kong) Yip P Y	21	21
4	(Chinese Taipei) Cheng S-c	13	21	21
Q2	(Singapore) Chen JY	21	17	11
7	(Japan) S Sato	21	21
(Bulgaria) P Nedelcheva	13	15

Quarterfinals
(Singapore) Xing AY	21	23
(Hong Kong) Yip P Y	9	21
4	(Chinese Taipei) Cheng S-c	21	21
7	(Japan) S Sato	15	8

Semifinals
(Singapore) Xing AY	21	7
4	(Chinese Taipei) Cheng S-c	23	21

=== Bottom half ===
First Round
PFQ	(Malaysia) Cheah L L Y	11	16
(Japan) E Hirose	21	21
(Indonesia) A Yuswandari	19	15
5	(Chinese Taipei) Tai T-y	21	21
(Japan) M Mitani	17	13
3	(South Korea) Sung J-h	21	21
PFQ	(Thailand) B Ongbumrungpan	15	21	21
(Malaysia) Tee J Y	21	10	19
(Thailand) P Buranaprasertsuk	21	22
8	(Singapore) Gu J	18	20
(China) Chen XJ	21	21
(India) P.V. Sindhu	16	12
(Thailand) S Ponsana	15	15
2	(Germany) J Schenk	21	21

Second Round
(Japan) E Hirose	21	21
5	(Chinese Taipei) Tai T-y	15	18
(Singapore) Fu MT	17	18
3	(South Korea) Sung J-h	21	21
PFQ	(Thailand) B Ongbumrungpan	15	19
(Thailand) P Buranaprasertsuk	21	21
(China) Chen XJ	12	21	16
2	(Germany) J Schenk	21	10	21

Quarterfinals
(Japan) E Hirose	14	21	13
3	(South Korea) Sung J-h	21	10	21
(Thailand) P Buranaprasertsuk	12	21	19
2	(Germany) J Schenk	21	9	21

Semifinals
3	(South Korea) Sung J-h	11	22	12
2	(Germany) J Schenk	21	20	21

=== Finals ===
Semifinals
(Singapore) Xing Aiying	21	7
4	(Chinese Taipei) Cheng Shao-chieh	23	21
3	(South Korea) Sung Ji-hyun	11	22	12
2	(Germany) Juliane Schenk	21	20	21

Final
4	(Chinese Taipei) Cheng Shao-chieh	11	24
2	(Germany) Juliane Schenk	21	26

== Men's doubles ==
=== Seeds ===
1. (South Korea) Jung Jae-sung / Lee Yong-dae
2. (South Korea) Ko Sung-hyun / Yoo Yeon-seong
3. (Indonesia) Mohammad Ahsan / Bona Septano
4. (Indonesia) Markis Kido / Hendra Setiawan
5. (Chinese Taipei) Fang Chieh-min / Lee Sheng-mu
6. (China) Hong Wei / Shen Ye
7. (Japan) Naoki Kawamae / Shoji Sato
8. (Japan) Hirokatsu Hashimoto / Noriyasu Hirata

=== Top half ===
First Round
PFQ	(Malaysia) Chooi K M (Malaysia) Ow Y H	21	10	21
(Germany) I Kindervater (Germany) J Schöttler	14	21	13
(Malaysia) Heg N W K (Malaysia) Teo E Y	16	15
(Japan) H Endo (Japan) K Hayakawa	21	21
5	(Chinese Taipei) Fang C-m (Chinese Taipei) Lee S-m	21	21
(Malaysia) M Z A Latif (Malaysia) M F M Tazari	8	13
(Indonesia) Y S Dasuki (Indonesia) H A Gunawan	14	16
(Denmark) C J Skovgård (Denmark) M Pieler Koldking	21	21
4	(Indonesia) M Kido (Indonesia) H Setiawan	21	21
(Austria) J Koch (Austria) P Zauner	15	10
(Malaysia) Hoon T H (Malaysia) Tan W K	21	21
(India) K Tarun (India) A Vishnu	9	13
7	(Japan) N Kawamae (Japan) S Sato	21	21
Q3	(Singapore) P S Atmaja (Singapore) H C J Wong	12	19
(Malaysia) Goh V S (Malaysia) Lim K W	21	21
Q1	(Russia) A Ashmarin (Russia) S Shumilkin	18	11

Second Round
PFQ	(Malaysia) Chooi K M (Malaysia) Ow Y H	16	10
(Japan) H Endo (Japan) K Hayakawa	21	21
5	(Chinese Taipei) Fang C-m (Chinese Taipei) Lee S-m	18	26	13
(Denmark) C J Skovgård (Denmark) M Pieler Kolding	21	24	21
4	(Indonesia) M Kido (Indonesia) H Setiawan	10	21	21
(Malaysia) Hoon T H (Malaysia) Tan W K	21	14	18
7	(Japan) N Kawamae (Japan) S Sato	15	21	16
(Malaysia) Goh V S (Malaysia) Lim K W	21	17	21

Quarterfinals
(Japan) H Endo (Japan) K Hayakawa	20	21	21
(Denmark) C J Skovgård (Denmark) M Pieler Kolding	22	12	9
4	(Indonesia) M Kido (Indonesia) H Setiawan	21	21
(Malaysia) Goh V S (Malaysia) Lim K W	18	17

Semifinals
(Japan) H Endo (Japan) K Hayakawa	21	11	15
4	(Indonesia) M Kido (Indonesia) H Setiawan	16	21	21

=== Bottom half ===
First Round
(Indonesia) A Pratama (Indonesia) R A Saputro	21	21
(Malaysia) Chan P S (Malaysia) Ong J G	15	12
(Singapore) Yong Z A C (Singapore) Zi L D W	15	11
8	(Japan) H Hashimoto (Japan) N Hirata	21	21
(China) Liu XL (China) Qiu ZH	18	21	19
(Denmark) M Conrad-Petersen (Denmark) J Rasmussen	21	7	21
(Singapore) Zhao J T Y (Singapore) Liu Y	10	13
3	(Indonesia) M Ahsan (Indonesia) B Septano	21	21
(Malaysia) Mak H C (Malaysia) Teo K S	21	12	21
Q2	(Singapore) R Susilo (Indonesia) C Wijaya	15	21	17
(Malaysia) Gan T C (Malaysia) Ong S H	15	18
6	(China) Hong W (China) Shen Y	21	21
Q4	(Malaysia) Kok Z Y (Malaysia) Kong K Z	15	16
(Singapore) D B Chrisnanta (Singapore) C Triyachart	21	21
(Australia) R Smith (Australia) G Warfe	14	20
2	(South Korea) Ko S-h (South Korea) Yoo Y-s	21	22

Second Round
(Indonesia) A Pratama (Indonesia) R A Saputro	11	10
8	(Japan) H Hashimoto (Japan) N Hirata	21	21
(Denmark) M Conrad-Petersen (Denmark) J Rasmussen	15	18
3	(Indonesia) M Ahsan (Indonesia) B Septano	21	21
(Malaysia) Mak H C (Malaysia) Teo K S	18	15
6	(China) Hong W (China) Shen Y	21	21
(Singapore) D B Chrisnanta (Singapore) C Triyachart	14	17
2	(South Korea) Ko S-h (South Korea) Yoo Y-s	21	21

Quarterfinals
8	(Japan) H Hashimoto (Japan) N Hirata	21	12	20
3	(Indonesia) M Ahsan (Indonesia) B Septano	19	21	22
6	(China) Hong W (China) Shen Y	17	12
2	(South Korea) Ko S-h (South Korea) Yoo Y-s	21	21

Semifinals
3	(Indonesia) M Ahsan (Indonesia) B Septano	21	19	14
2	(South Korea) Ko S-h (South Korea) Yoo Y-s	19	21	21

=== Finals ===
Semifinals
(Japan) Hiroyuki Endo (Japan) Kenichi Hayakawa	21	11	15
4	(Indonesia) Markis Kido (Indonesia) Hendra Setiawan	16	21	21
3	(Indonesia) Mohammad Ahsan (Indonesia) Bona Septano	21	19	14
2	(South Korea) Ko Sung-hyun (South Korea) Yoo Yeon-seong	19	21	21

Final
4	(Indonesia) Markis Kido (Indonesia) Hendra Setiawan	22	11	21
2	(South Korea) Ko Sung-hyun (South Korea) Yoo Yeon-seong	20	21	6

== Women's doubles ==
=== Seeds ===
1. (Japan) Mizuki Fujii / Reika Kakiiwa
2. (South Korea) Jung Kyung-eun / Kim Ha-na
3. (Japan) Shizuka Matsuo / Mami Naito
4. (Japan) Miyuki Maeda / Satoko Suetsuna
5. (China) Bao Yixin / Zhong Qianxin
6. (Chinese Taipei) Cheng Wen-hsing / Chien Yu-chin
7. (Singapore) Shinta Mulia Sari / Lei Yao
8. (Indonesia) Meiliana Jauhari / Greysia Polii

=== Top half ===
First Round
(Singapore) Y Y V Neo (Singapore) T T Thng	18	22	17
(Malaysia) Chow M K (Malaysia) Lee M Y	21	20	21
(Indonesia) P Z Bernadeth (Indonesia) R A Pradipta	21	21
(Singapore) Fu MT (Singapore) Xing AY	11	15
(Indonesia) V Marissa (Indonesia) N Melati	10	21	21
(Thailand) D Aroonkesorn (Thailand) K Voravichitchaikul	21	15	16
7	(Singapore) S M Sari (Singapore) Yao L	21	18	21
(Malaysia) Hoo V K M (Malaysia) Woon K W	18	21	18
(Malaysia) Goh L Y (Malaysia) Lim Y L	21	10	17
(Hong Kong) Poon L Y (Hong Kong) Tse Y S	15	21	21

Second Round
1	(Japan) M Fujii (Japan) R Kakiiwa	21	21
(Malaysia) Chow M K (Malaysia) Lee M Y	14	13
5	(China) Bao YX (China) Zhong QX	21	17
(Indonesia) P Z Bernadeth (Indonesia) R A Pradipta	19	9^{r}
4	(Japan) M Maeda (Japan) S Suetsuna	21	21
(Indonesia) V Marissa (Indonesia) N Melati	14	12
7	(Singapore) S M Sari (Singapore) Yao L	21	12	21
(Hong Kong) Poon L Y (Hong Kong) Tse Y S	9	21	5

Quarterfinals
1	(Japan) M Fujii (Japan) R Kakiiwa	18	19
5	(China) Bao YX (China) Zhong QX	21	21
4	(Japan) M Maeda (Japan) S Suetsuna	21	17	27
7	(Singapore) S M Sari (Singapore) Yao L	19	21	25

Semifinals
5	(China) Bao YX (China) Zhong QX	21	21
4	(Japan) M Maeda (Japan) S Suetsuna	15	8

=== Bottom half ===
First Round
(Japan) M Matsutomo (Japan) A Takahashi	21	22
(Australia) L Choo (Australia) R Veeran	12	20
(Thailand) S Ekmongkolpaisarn (Thailand) P Munkitamorn	18	10
6	(Chinese Taipei) Cheng W-h (Chinese Taipei) Chien Y-c	21	21
(India) P Gadre (India) P Sawant
(China) Cheng S (China) Pan P	w	d	n
(Singapore) Chen JY (Singapore) Gu J	9	8
(India) J Gutta (India) A Ponnappa	21	21
(Indonesia) A F Agustin (Indonesia) N K Maheswari	21	21
(South Korea) Eom H-w (South Korea) Jang Y-n	17	14

Second Round
(Japan) M Matsutomo (Japan) A Takahashi	21	14	18
6	(Chinese Taipei) Cheng W-h (Chinese Taipei) Chien Y-c	9	21	21
(India) P Gadre (India) P Sawant	18	15
3	(Japan) S Matsuo (Japan) M Naito	21	21
(India) J Gutta (India) A Ponnappa	15	20
8	(Indonesia) M Jauhari (Indonesia) G Polii	21	22
(Indonesia) A F Agustin (Indonesia) N K Maheswari	14	21	23
2	(South Korea) Jung K-e (South Korea) Kim H-n	21	15	21

Quarterfinals
6	(Chinese Taipei) Cheng W-h (Chinese Taipei) Chien Y-c	21	16	21
3	(Japan) S Matsuo (Japan) M Naito	18	21	14
8	(Indonesia) M Jauhari (Indonesia) G Polii	21	21
(Indonesia) A F Agustin (Indonesia) N K Maheswari	10	12

Semifinals
6	(Chinese Taipei) Cheng W-h (Chinese Taipei) Chien Y-c	21	19	21
8	(Indonesia) M Jauhari (Indonesia) G Polii	13	21	16

=== Finals ===
Semifinals
5	(China) Bao Yixin (China) Zhong Qianxin	21	21
4	(Japan) Miyuki Maeda (Japan) Satoko Suetsuna	15	8
6	(Chinese Taipei) Cheng Wen-hsing (Chinese Taipei) Chien Yu-chin	21	19	21
8	(Indonesia) Meiliana Jauhari (Indonesia) Greysia Polii	13	21	16

Final
5	(China) Bao Yixin (China) Zhong Qianxin	21	21
6	(Chinese Taipei) Cheng Wen-hsing (Chinese Taipei) Chien Yu-chin	12	17

== Mixed doubles ==
=== Seeds ===
1. (Indonesia) Tontowi Ahmad / Lilyana Natsir
2. (Chinese Taipei) Chen Hung-ling / Cheng Wen-hsing
3. (Malaysia) Chan Peng Soon / Goh Liu Ying
4. (Japan) Shintaro Ikeda / Reiko Shiota
5. (China) He Hanbin / Bao Yixin
6. (India) Diju V. / Jwala Gutta
7. (Japan) Shoji Sato / Shizuka Matsuo
8. (Indonesia) Muhammad Rijal / Debby Susanto

=== Top half ===
First Round
(Indonesia) F Kurniawan (Indonesia) S P Irawati	17	21	21
(Singapore) Z J T Yeo (Singapore) Y Dellis	21	10	8
(Denmark) M Pieler Kolding (Denmark) J Houmann	14	21
(Poland) R Mateusiak (Poland) N Zieba	21	23
(Singapore) Liu Y (Singapore) Ting T T	11	18
(Thailand) T Lapoe (Thailand) P Munkitamorn	21	21
5	(China) He HB (China) Bao YX	w	/	o
(Indonesia) A Pratama (Indonesia) N Melati
(Thailand) S Anugritayawon (Thailand) K Voravichitchaikul	21	11	18
(Indonesia) H Setiawan (Indonesia) V Marissa	15	21	21

Second Round
1	(Indonesia) T Ahmad (Indonesia) L Natsir
(Indonesia) F Kurniawan (Indonesia) S P Irawati	w	/	o
7	(Japan) S Sato (Japan) S Matsuo	21	21
(Poland) R Mateusiak (Poland) N Zieba	19	16
4	(Japan) S Ikeda (Japan) R Shiota	21	21
(Thailand) T Lapoe (Thailand) P Munkitamorn	13	16
5	(China) He HB (China) Bao YX	17	21	15
(Indonesia) H Setiawan (Indonesia) V Marissa	21	17	21

Quarterfinals
(Indonesia) F Kurniawan (Indonesia) S P Irawati	21	14	19
7	(Japan) S Sato (Japan) S Matsuo	19	21	21
4	(Japan) S Ikeda (Japan) R Shiota	21	22
(Indonesia) H Setiawan (Indonesia) V Marissa	17	20

Semifinals
7	(Japan) S Sato (Japan) S Matsuo	18	16
4	(Japan) S Ikeda (Japan) R Shiota	21	21

=== Bottom half ===
First Round
(South Korea) Ko S-h (South Korea) Eom H-w
(Malaysia) M R A Latif (Malaysia) A A Anscelly	w	d	n
(South Korea) Yoo Y-s (South Korea) Jang Y-n	21	17	21
8	(Indonesia) M Rijal (Indonesia) D Susanto	17	21	15
(India) K Tarun (India) A Ponnappa	15	17
(Japan) N Hirata (Japan) M Maeda	21	21
(Malaysia) Tan A Q (Malaysia) Lai P J	21	13	21
(Singapore) D B Chrisnanta (Singapore) Y Y V Neo	17	21	13
(Indonesia) M Kido (Indonesia) P Z Bernadeth	18	12
6	(India) Diju V. (India) J Gutta	21	21
(Malaysia) Ong J G (Malaysia) Lim Y L	18	18
(Japan) K Hayakawa (Japan) M Matsutomo	21	21

Second Round
(South Korea) Ko S-h (South Korea) Eom H-w	21	17	16
(South Korea) Yoo Y-s (South Korea) Jang Y-n	19	21	21
(Japan) N Hirata (Japan) M Maeda	20	21	14
3	(Malaysia) Chan P S (Malaysia) Goh L Y	22	18	21
(Malaysia) Tan A Q (Malaysia) Lai P J	15	15
6	(India) Diju V. (India) J Gutta	21	21
(Japan) K Hayakawa (Japan) M Matsutomo	13	24	13
2	(Chinese Taipei) Chen H-l (Chinese Taipei) Cheng W-h	21	22	21

Quarterfinals
(South Korea) Yoo Y-s (South Korea) Jang Y-n	13	20
3	(Malaysia) Chan P S (Malaysia) Goh L Y	21	22
6	(India) Diju V. (India) J Gutta	21	14	17
2	(Chinese Taipei) Chen H-l (Chinese Taipei) Cheng W-h	13	21	21

Semifinals
3	(Malaysia) Chan P S (Malaysia) Goh L Y	16	13
2	(Chinese Taipei) Chen H-l (Chinese Taipei) Cheng W-h	21	21

=== Finals ===
Semifinals
7	(Japan) Shoji Sato (Japan) Shizuka Matsuo	18	16
4	(Japan) Shintaro Ikeda (Japan) Reiko Shiota	21	21
3	(Malaysia) Chan Peng Soon (Malaysia) Goh Liu Ying	16	13
2	(Chinese Taipei) Chen Hung-ling (Chinese Taipei) Cheng Wen-hsing	21	21

Final
4	(Japan) Shintaro Ikeda (Japan) Reiko Shiota	17	11
2	(Chinese Taipei) Chen Hung-ling (Chinese Taipei) Cheng Wen-hsing	21	21

Preceded by 2011 Singapore Super Series	Singapore Super Series	Succeeded by 2013 Singapore Super Series
Preceded by 2012 Indonesia Super Series Premier	BWF Super Series; 2012 season	Succeeded by 2012 China Masters
