= 2012 Indonesia Super Series Premier =

Tournament details
- Dates: 12–16 June
- Edition: 31st
- Level: Super Series Premier
- Total prize money: US$650,000
- Venue: Istora Gelora Bung Karno
- Location: Jakarta, Indonesia

Champions
- Men's singles: (Indonesia) Simon Santoso
- Women's singles: (India) Saina Nehwal
- Men's doubles: (South Korea) Jung Jae-sung (South Korea) Lee Yong-dae
- Women's doubles: (China) Wang Xiaoli (China) Yu Yang
- Mixed doubles: (Thailand) Sudket Prapakamol (Thailand) Saralee Thungthongkam

The 2012 Indonesia Open Super Series Premier was the fifth super series tournament of the 2012 BWF Super Series. The tournament was held in Jakarta, Indonesia, from 12 to 17 June 2012 and had a total purse of $650,000.

== Men's singles ==
=== Seeds ===
1. (China) Chen Long (second round)
2. (China) Chen Jin (first round)
3. (Denmark) Peter Gade (first round)
4. (Japan) Sho Sasaki (first round)
5. (South Korea) Lee Hyun-il (second round)
6. (Japan) Kenichi Tago (first round)
7. (Indonesia) Simon Santoso (winner)
8. (China) Du Pengyu (runner-up)

=== Top half ===
First Round
1	(China) Chen L	16	21	21
(Malaysia) M H Hashim	21	11	19
(Guatemala) K Cordón	19	21	16
(India) K Parupalli	21	19	21
5	(South Korea) Lee H-i	21	11	22
Q3	(India) Gurusaidutt R.M.V.	13	21	20
PFQ	(Malaysia) D Liew	14	25	14
(Denmark) H-K Vittinghus	21	23	21
4	(Japan) S Sasaki	21	17	22
(Indonesia) D H Rumbaka	11	21	24
(Denmark) V Axelsen	16	14
(India) A Jayaram	21	21
7	(Indonesia) S Santoso	21	21
Q2	(India) S Varma	18	14
(South Korea) Shon W-h	18	18
(Hong Kong) Wong W K	21	21

Second Round
1	(China) Chen L	17	14
(India) K Parupalli	21	21
5	(South Korea) Lee H-i	20	11
(Denmark) H-K Vittinghus	22	21
(Indonesia) D H Rumbaka	21	21
(India) A Jayaram	15	14
7	(Indonesia) S Santoso	15	21	21
(Hong Kong) Wong W K	21	16	19

Quarterfinals
(India) K Parupalli	21	21
(Denmark) H-K Vittinghus	15	14
(Indonesia) D H Rumbaka	17	7
7	(Indonesia) S Santoso	21	21

Semifinals
(India) K Parupalli	15	12
7	(Indonesia) S Santoso	21	21

=== Bottom half ===
First Round
(England) R Ouseph	21	11	11
(Chinese Taipei) Hsu J-h	16	21	21
(Spain) P Abian	8	11
8	(China) Du PY	21	21
Q1	(Indonesia) A K Tedjono	18	19
(Indonesia) T Hidayat	21	21
Q4	(Indonesia) S D Kuncoro	14	21	21
3	(Denmark) P Gade	21	7	18
(Thailand) B Ponsana	15	14
(Indonesia) A Yunus	21	21
(Hong Kong) Hu Y	21	23
6	(Japan) K Tago	17	21
(Indonesia) T Sugiarto	21	18	20
(Vietnam) Nguyen T M	13	21	22
(Denmark) J Ø Jørgensen	21	10
2	(China) Chen J	16	7^{r}

Second Round
(Chinese Taipei) Hsu J-h	19	14
8	(China) Du PY	21	21
(Indonesia) T Hidayat	14	18
Q4	(Indonesia) S D Kuncoro	21	21
(Indonesia) A Yunus	21	20	10
(Hong Kong) Hu Y	11	22	21
(Vietnam) Nguyen T M	21	21
(Denmark) J Ø Jørgensen	19	16

Quarterfinals
8	(China) Du PY	21	21
Q4	(Indonesia) S D Kuncoro	14	15
(Hong Kong) Hu Y	21	8	21
(Vietnam) Nguyen T M	19	21	9

Semifinals
8	(China) Du PY	21	21
(Hong Kong) Hu Y	16	12

=== Finals ===
Semifinals
(India) Kashyap Parupalli	15	12
7	(Indonesia) Simon Santoso	21	21
8	(China) Du Pengyu	21	21
(Hong Kong) Hu Yun	16	12

Final
7	(Indonesia) Simon Santoso	21	13	21
8	(China) Du Pengyu	18	21	11

== Women's singles ==
=== Seeds ===
1. (China) Wang Yihan (semifinal)
2. (China) Wang Xin (quarterfinal)
3. (China) Wang Shixian (quarterfinal)
4. (China) Li Xuerui (Runner up)
5. (India) Saina Nehwal (winner)
6. (China) Jiang Yanjiao (second round)
7. (Denmark) Tine Baun (quarterfinal)
8. (Germany) Juliane Schenk (quarterfinal)

=== Top half ===
First Round
1	(China) Wang YH	7
PFQ	(Indonesia) A Firdasari	7^{r}
(Hong Kong) Chan T K	21	10	17
(Japan) E Hirose	14	21	21
7	(Denmark) T Baun	21	7	21
(Chinese Taipei) Tai T-y	12	21	16
(Netherlands) Yao J	18	9
(Bulgaria) P Nedelcheva	21	21
4	(China) Li XR	21	21
(Singapore) Fu MT	5	12
(Thailand) P Buranaprasertsuk	21	21
(Italy) A Allegrini	15	13
8	(Germany) J Schenk	24	21
(Thailand) S Taerattanachai	22	18
(India) P. V. Sindhu	13	21	21
(Indonesia) M F Kusumastuti	21	18	19

Second Round
1	(China) Wang YH	23	21
(Japan) E Hirose	21	19
7	(Denmark) T Baun	21	21
(Bulgaria) P Nedelcheva	15	12
4	(China) Li XR	23	14	21
(Thailand) P Buranaprasertsuk	21	21	16
8	(Germany) J Schenk	21	21
(India) P. V. Sindhu	14	14

Quarterfinals
1	(China) Wang YH	21	26
7	(Denmark) T Baun	19	24
4	(China) Li XR	21	13	21
8	(Germany) J Schenk	16	21	16

Semifinals
1	(China) Wang YH	17	14
4	(China) Li XR	21	21

=== Bottom half ===
First Round
Q2	(Indonesia) D Hera	15	21	6
Q4	(Indonesia) A Yuswandari	21	16	21
(Japan) S Sato	12	21	17
5	(India) S Nehwal	21	14	21
(Singapore) Gu J	22	21
Q1	(Indonesia) A Rovita	20	17
Q3	(Thailand) B Ongbumrungpan	15	21	14
3	(China) Wang SX	21	17	21
(South Korea) Sung J-h	21	21
(Thailand) R Intanon	18	13
(South Korea) Bae Y-j	0^{r}
6	(China) Jiang YJ	4
(Spain) C Marín	21	22
(Hong Kong) Yip P Y	17	20
(Chinese Taipei) Cheng S-c	21	19	8
2	(China) Wang X	19	21	21

Second Round
Q4	(Indonesia) A Yuswandari	17	21	13
5	(India) S Nehwal	21	14	21
(Singapore) Gu J	12	11
3	(China) Wang SX	21	21
(South Korea) Sung J-h	18	21	21
6	(China) Jiang YJ	21	11	18
(Spain) C Marín	7	16
2	(China) Wang X	21	21

Quarterfinals
5	(India) S Nehwal	21	21	21
3	(China) Wang SX	17	23	19
(South Korea) Sung J-h	21	21
2	(China) Wang X	16	17

Semifinals
5	(India) S Nehwal	22	21
(South Korea) Sung J-h	20	18

=== Finals ===
Semifinals
1	(China) Wang Yihan	17	14
4	(China) Li Xuerui	21	21
5	(India) Saina Nehwal	22	21
(South Korea) Sung Ji-hyun	20	18

Final
4	(China) Li Xuerui	21	20	19
5	(India) Saina Nehwal	13	22	21

== Men's doubles ==
=== Seeds ===
1. (China) Cai Yun / Fu Haifeng (withdrew)
2. (South Korea) Jung Jae-sung / Lee Yong-dae (winner)
3. (Denmark) Mathias Boe / Carsten Mogensen (Runner up)
4. (South Korea) Ko Sung-hyun / Yoo Yeon-seong (second round)
5. (China) Chai Biao / Guo Zhendong (quarterfinal)
6. (Indonesia) Mohammad Ahsan / Bona Septano (first round)
7. (Chinese Taipei) Fang Chieh-min / Lee Sheng-mu (first round)
8. (Malaysia) Koo Kien Keat / Tan Boon Heong (semifinal)

=== Top half ===
First Round
PFQ	(Thailand) P Chalardchaleam (Thailand) N Phuangphuapet	21	19	21
PFQ	(Denmark) C John Skovgård (Denmark) M Pieler Kolding	18	21	11
(Indonesia) Y S Dasuki (Indonesia) H A Gunawan	19	13
Q4	(Indonesia) R Alexander (Indonesia) S Geh	21	21
8	(Malaysia) Koo K K (Malaysia) Tan B H	21	21
(Indonesia) A Pratama (Indonesia) R A Saputro	14	17
(Malaysia) M Z A Latif (Malaysia) M F M Tazari	21	21	21
(Germany) I Kindervater (Germany) J Schöttler	12	23	13
3	(Denmark) M Boe (Denmark) C Mogensen	21	21
(India) T Kona (India) A Vishnu	14	13
(Denmark) M Conrad-Petersen (Denmark) J Rasmussen	21	17
(Indonesia) R K Suwardi (Indonesia) M Ulinnuha	23	21
5	(China) Chai B (China) Guo ZD	21	21
Q3	(Indonesia) A M Adiartama (Indonesia) E Subaktiar	16	19
(Austria) J Koch (Austria) P Zauner	9	17
(Japan) H Hashimoto (Japan) N Hirata	21	21

Second Round
PFQ	(Thailand) P Chalardchaleam (Thailand) N Phuangphuapet	15	23	21
Q4	(Indonesia) R Alexander (Indonesia) S Geh	21	21	19
8	(Malaysia) Koo K K (Malaysia) Tan B H	21	21
(Malaysia) M Z A Latif (Malaysia) M F M Tazari	17	14
3	(Denmark) M Boe (Denmark) C Mogensen	21	21
(Indonesia) R K Suwardi (Indonesia) M Ulinnuha	18	19
5	(China) Chai B (China) Guo ZD	21	22	21
(Japan) H Hashimoto (Japan) N Hirata	12	24	14

Quarterfinals
PFQ	(Thailand) P Chalardchaleam (Thailand) N Phuangphuapet	11	15
(Malaysia) Koo K K (Malaysia) Tan B H	21	21
3	(Denmark) M Boe (Denmark) C Mogensen	21	21
5	(China) Chai B (China) Guo ZD	13	15

Semifinals
8	(Malaysia) Koo K K (Malaysia) Tan B H	15	11
3	(Denmark) M Boe (Denmark) C Mogensen	21	21

=== Bottom half ===
First Round
(Malaysia) Goh V S (Malaysia) Lim K W	21	18	17
(Indonesia) Y R Sugiarto (Indonesia) A Y Wirawan	14	21	21
(Indonesia) M Kido (Indonesia) H Setiawan	17	21	21
7	(Chinese Taipei) Fang C-m (Chinese Taipei) Lee S-m	21	18	18
Q2	(Philippines) P J Escueta (Philippines) P G Magnaye	20	16
(Indonesia) R Wijaya (Indonesia) R Sukmawan	22	21
Q1	(Indonesia) W Nayaka (Indonesia) A Yusuf	18	17
4	(South Korea) Ko S-h (South Korea) Yoo Y-s	21	21
(China) Liu XL (China) Qiu ZH	19	23
(Indonesia) A Adistia (Indonesia) C Rusdianto	21	25
(Malaysia) Hoon T H (Malaysia) Tan W K	21	19	21
6	(Indonesia) M Ahsan (Indonesia) B Septano	16	21	17
(China) Hong W (China) Shen Y	17	20
(Indonesia) M F Gideon (Indonesia) A P R Putra	21	22
(Japan) N Kawamae (Japan) S Sato	19	18
2	(South Korea) Jung J-s (South Korea) Lee Y-d	21	21

Second Round
(Indonesia) Y R Sugiarto (Indonesia) A Y Wirawan	19	11
(Indonesia) M Kido (Indonesia) H Setiawan	21	21
(Indonesia) R Wijaya (Indonesia) R Sukmawan	22	21
4	(South Korea) Ko S-h (South Korea) Yoo Y-s	20	18
(Indonesia) A Adistia (Indonesia) C Rusdianto	17	13
(Malaysia) Hoon T H (Malaysia) Tan W K	21	21
(Indonesia) M F Gideon (Indonesia) A P R Putra	21	12	14
2	(South Korea) Jung J-s (South Korea) Lee Y-d	13	21	21

Quarterfinals
(Indonesia) M Kido (Indonesia) H Setiawan	21	21
(Indonesia) R Wijaya (Indonesia) R Sukmawan	18	9
(Malaysia) Hoon T H (Malaysia) Tan W K	17	14
2	(South Korea) Jung J-s (South Korea) Lee Y-d	21	21

Semifinals
(Indonesia) M Kido (Indonesia) H Setiawan	21	17	15
2	(South Korea) Jung J-s (South Korea) Lee Y-d	14	21	21

=== Finals ===
Semifinals
8	(Malaysia) Koo Kien Keat (Malaysia) Tan Boon Heong	15	11
3	(Denmark) Mathias Boe (Denmark) Carsten Mogensen	21	21
(Indonesia) Markis Kido (Indonesia) Hendra Setiawan	21	17	15
2	(South Korea) Jung Jae-sung (South Korea) Lee Yong-dae	14	21	21

Final
3	(Denmark) Mathias Boe (Denmark) Carsten Mogensen	21	21	11
2	(South Korea) Jung Jae-sung (South Korea) Lee Yong-dae	23	19	21

== Women's doubles ==
=== Seeds ===
1. (China) Wang Xiaoli / Yu Yang (champions)
2. (China) Tian Qing / Zhao Yunlei (final)
3. (South Korea) Ha Jung-eun / Kim Min-jung (withdrew)
4. (Japan) Mizuki Fujii / Reika Kakiiwa (second round)
5. (Denmark) Christinna Pedersen / Kamilla Rytter Juhl (first round)
6. (Japan) Shizuka Matsuo / Mami Naito (quarterfinals)
7. (South Korea) Jung Kyung-eun / Kim Ha-na (quarterfinals)
8. (Japan) Miyuki Maeda / Satoko Suetsuna (quarterfinals)

=== Top half ===
First Round
1	(China) Wang XL (China) Yu Y	21	21
Q2	(Indonesia) F E Kusumawati (Indonesia) N R Ayu	3	7
(South Korea) Eom H-w (South Korea) Jang Y-n	21	19	21
Q3	(Indonesia) M D Oktavianti (Indonesia) R E Putri Sari	10	21	17
6	(Japan) S Matsuo (Japan) M Naito	23	23
(Thailand) D Aroonkesorn (Thailand) K Voravichitchaikul	21	21
(Indonesia) K Dewi (Indonesia) J Gozali	21	21
(Malaysia) V Hoo (Malaysia) Woon K W	18	19
4	(Japan) M Fujii (Japan) R Kakiiwa	16	21	21
(Hong Kong) Poon L Y (Hong Kong) Tse Y S	21	11	18
(China) Bao YX (China) Zhong QX	21	18	21
(Indonesia) A F Agustin (Indonesia) N K Maheswari	14	21	16
7	(South Korea) Jung K-e (South Korea) Kim H-n	21	21	21
(Thailand) S Amitrapai (Thailand) S Taerattanachai	11	23	17
(Malaysia) Chin E H (Malaysia) Wong P T	21	21
(Thailand) S Ekmongkolpaisarn (Thailand) P Munkitamorn	14	14

Second Round
1	(China) Wang XL (China) Yu Y	21	21
(South Korea) Eom H-w (South Korea) Jang Y-n	7	18
6	(Japan) S Matsuo (Japan) M Naito	21	21
(Indonesia) K Dewi (Indonesia) J Gozali	16	5
4	(Japan) M Fujii (Japan) R Kakiiwa	19	10
(China) Bao YX (China) Zhong QX	21	21
7	(South Korea) Jung K-e (South Korea) Kim H-n	18	22	21
(Malaysia) Chin E H (Malaysia) Wong P T	21	20	10

Quarterfinals
1	(China) Wang XL (China) Yu Y	w	/	o
6	(Japan) S Matsuo (Japan) M Naito
(China) Bao YX (China) Zhong QX	21	21
7	(South Korea) Jung K-e (South Korea) Kim H-n	18	11

Semifinals
1	(China) Wang XL (China) Yu Y	21	21
(China) Bao YX (China) Zhong QX	10	13

=== Bottom half ===
First Round
Q1	(Indonesia) M Oklamona (Indonesia) K Rosmini	21	21	21
(India) P Gadre (India) P Sawant	23	19	19
(Indonesia) S R Andini (Indonesia) D D Haris	18	15
8	(Japan) M Maeda (Japan) S Suetsuna	21	21
(Indonesia) M Jauhiari (Indonesia) G Polii	21	21
(Singapore) Fu MT (Singapore) Xing AY	10	13
(Indonesia) G R Imawan (Indonesia) T R Nuraidah	21	21
PFQ	(Indonesia) R Amelia (Indonesia) D P Medita	16	14
(Indonesia) V Marissa (Indonesia) N Melati	14	14
(China) Xia H (China) Tang JH	21	21
Q4	(Indonesia) P Z Bernadet (Indonesia) R A Pradipta	21	21
5	(Denmark) C Pedersen (Denmark) K Rytter Juhl	17	18
(Indonesia) S D Aulia (Indonesia) A S Awanda	21	18	18
(Chinese Taipei) Cheng W-h (Chinese Taipei) Chien Y-c	19	21	21
(India) J Gutta (India) A Ponnappa	13	17
2	(China) Tian Q (China) Zhao YL	21	21

Second Round
Q1	(Indonesia) M Oklamona (Indonesia) K Rosmini	15	15
8	(Japan) M Maeda (Japan) S Suetsuna	21	21
(Indonesia) M Jauhari (Indonesia) G Polii	21	15	21
(Indonesia) G R Imawan (Indonesia) T R Nuraidah	15	21	12
(China) Xia H (China) Tang JH	21	21
Q4	(Indonesia) P Z Bernadet (Indonesia) R A Pradipta	9	12
(Chinese Taipei) Cheng W-h (Chinese Taipei) Chien Y-c	10	16
2	(China) Tian Q (China) Zhao YL	21	21

Quarterfinals
8	(Japan) M Maeda (Japan) S Suetsuna	13	16
(Indonesia) M Jauhari (Indonesia) G Polii	21	21
(China) Xia H (China) Tang JH	11	15
2	(China) Tian Q (China) Zhao YL	21	21

Semifinals
(Indonesia) M Jauhari (Indonesia) G Polii	16	21	19
2	(China) Tian Q (China) Zhao YL	21	17	21

=== Finals ===
Semifinals
1	(China) Wang Xiaoli (China) Yu Yang	21	21
(China) Bao Yixin (China) Zhong Qianxin	10	13
(Indonesia) Meiliana Jauhari (Indonesia) Greysia Polii	16	21	19
2	(China) Tian Qing (China) Zhao Yunlei	21	17	21

Final
1	(China) Wang Xiaoli (China) Yu Yang	17	21	21
2	(China) Tian Qing (China) Zhao Yunlei	21	9	16

== Mixed doubles ==
=== Seeds ===
1. (China) Zhang Nan / Zhao Yunlei (quarterfinal)
2. (China) Xu Chen / Ma Jin (semifinal)
3. (Indonesia) Tontowi Ahmad / Liliyana Natsir (runner-up)
4. (Denmark) Joachim Fischer Nielsen / Christinna Pedersen (quarterfinal)
5. (Chinese Taipei) Chen Hung-ling / Cheng Wen-hsing (first round)
6. (Denmark) Thomas Laybourn / Kamilla Rytter Juhl (first round)
7. (South Korea) Lee Yong-dae / Ha Jung-eun (withdrew)
8. (Malaysia) Chan Peng Soon / Goh Liu Ying (second round)

=== Top half ===
First Round
1	(China) Zhang N (China) Zhao YL	21	21
(England) C Adcock (Scotland) I Bankier	16	19
(Indonesia) H Setiawan (Indonesia) V Marissa	21	21
Q4	(Indonesia) L A Nugroho (Indonesia) A Saufika	16	18
8	(Malaysia) Chan P S (Malaysia) Goh L Y	21	22	21
(Indonesia) M Rijal (Indonesia) D Susanto	16	24	16
PFQ	(Indonesia) E Subaktiar (Indonesia) M D Oktavianti	22	13
(Thailand) S Prapakamol (Thailand) S Thungthongkam	24	21
4	(Denmark) J Fischer Nielsen (Denmark) C Pedersen	18	21	21
(Japan) S Sato (Japan) S Matsuo	21	12	14
Q3	(Indonesia) A E Prasetya (Indonesia) G E Widjaja	16	16
(Indonesia) F Kurniawan (Indonesia) S P Irawati	21	21
6	(Denmark) T Laybourn (Denmark) K Rytter Juhl	18	16
(South Korea) Ko S-h (South Korea) Eom H-w	21	21
(Indonesia) R Widianto (Indonesia) R P Dili	21	21
(India) T Kona (India) A Ponnappa	16	10

Second Round
1	(China) Zhang N (China) Zhao YL	21	21
(Indonesia) H Setiawan (Indonesia) V Marissa	15	13
8	(Malaysia) Chan P S (Malaysia) Goh L Y	15	17
(Thailand) S Prapakamol (Thailand) S Thungthongkam	21	21
4	(Denmark) J Fischer Nielsen (Denmark) C Pedersen	21	21
(Indonesia) F Kurniawan (Indonesia) S P Irawati	8	11
(South Korea) Ko S-h (South Korea) Eom H-w	18	21	21
(Indonesia) R Widianto (Indonesia) R P Dili	21	17	18

Quarterfinals
1	(China) Zhang N (China) Zhao YL	21	18	17
(Thailand) S Prapakamol (Thailand) S Thungthongkam	18	21	21
4	(Denmark) J Fischer Nielsen (Denmark) C Pedersen	15	21	16
(South Korea) Ko S-h (South Korea) Eom H-w	21	14	21

Semifinals
(Thailand) S Prapakamol (Thailand) S Thungthongkam	21	21
(South Korea) Ko S-h (South Korea) Eom H-w	14	15

=== Bottom half ===
First Round
(Indonesia) I Fadhilah (Indonesia) W Anggraini	18	21	21
(Malaysia) M R A Latif (Malaysia) A A Anscelly	21	14	18
Q2	(Indonesia) M Kido (Indonesia) P Z Bernadet	21	21
5	(Chinese Taipei) Chen H-l (Chinese Taipei) Cheng W-h	17	18
(Thailand) M Jongjit (Thailand) S Amitrapai	21	21
Q1	(Indonesia) A Pratama (Indonesia) N Melati	13	17
(Japan) N Hirata (Japan) M Maeda	13	18
3	(Indonesia) T Ahmad (Indonesia) L Natsir	21	21
(South Korea) Yoo Y-s (South Korea) Jang Y-n	21	11	16
(India) V Diju (India) J Gutta	14	21	21
(China) Tao JM (China) Xia H	21	21
PFQ	(Thailand) T Lapoe (Thailand) P Munkitamorn	12	16
(Japan) S Ikeda (Japan) R Shiota	16	21	11
(China) He HB (China) Bao YX	21	9	21
(Denmark) M Pieler Kolding (Denmark) J Houmann	15	21	20
2	(China) Xu C (China) Ma J	21	19	22

Second Round
(Indonesia) I Fadhilah (Indonesia) W Anggraini	11	19
Q	(Indonesia) M Kido (Indonesia) P Z Bernadet	21	21
(Thailand) M Jongjit (Thailand) S Amitrapai	20	17
3	(Indonesia) T Ahmad (Indonesia) L Natsir	22	21
(India) V Diju (India) J Gutta	13	21	18
(China) Tao JM (China) Xia H	21	14	21
(China) He HB (China) Bao YX	8	8
2	(China) Xu C (China) Ma J	21	21

Quarterfinals
Q	(Indonesia) M Kido (Indonesia) P Z Bernadet	15	21	11
3	(Indonesia) T Ahmad (Indonesia) L Natsir	21	15	21
(China) Tao JM (China) Xia H	11	12
2	(China) Xu C (China) Ma J	21	21

Semifinals
3	(Indonesia) T Ahmad (Indonesia) L Natsir	21	15	21
2	(China) Xu C (China) Ma J	16	21	16

=== Finals ===
Semifinals
(Thailand) Sudket Prapakamol (Thailand) Saralee Thungthongkam	21	21
(South Korea) Ko Sung-hyun (South Korea) Eom Hye-won	14	15
3	(Indonesia) Tontowi Ahmad (Indonesia) Liliyana Natsir	21	15	21
2	(China) Xu Chen (China) Ma Jin	16	21	16

Final
(Thailand) Sudket Prapakamol (Thailand) Saralee Thungthongkam	21	17	21
3	(Indonesia) Tontowi Ahmad (Indonesia) Liliyana Natsir	17	21	13

Preceded by 2011 Indonesia Super Series	Indonesia Super Series	Succeeded by 2013 Indonesia Super Series Premier
Preceded by 2012 India Super Series	BWF Super Series; 2012 season	Succeeded by 2012 Singapore Super Series
