= Badminton at the 2011 SEA Games – Women's doubles =

These are the results of the women's doubles competition in badminton at the 2011 SEA Games in Jakarta.

== Medal winners ==
Gold	Silver	Bronze
Anneke Feinya Agustin (INA); Nitya Krishinda Maheswari (INA)	Vita Marissa (INA); Nadya Melati (INA)	Duanganong Aroonkesorn (THA); Kunchala Voravichitchaikul (THA) Shinta Mulia Sari (SIN); Yao Lei (SIN)

== Draw ==
First round
1	(Thailand) Duanganong Aroonkesorn (Thailand) Kunchala Voravichitchaikul
Bye
(Singapore) Chen Jiayuan (Singapore) Vanessa Neo	21	21
(Myanmar) Chaw Ei Ei (Myanmar) Nang Mo Hom	2	4
4	(Indonesia) Anneke Feinya Agustin (Indonesia) Nitya Krishinda Maheswari
Bye
(Malaysia) Vivian Hoo (Malaysia) Woon Khe Wei	21	21
(Vietnam) Nguyễn Thị Sen (Vietnam) Vũ Thị Trang	14	11
(Thailand) Sapsiree Taerattanachai (Thailand) Savitree Amitrapai	21	21
(Vietnam) Phùng Nguyễn Phương Nhi (Vietnam) Thái Thị Hồng Gấm	10	12
(Malaysia) Marylen Ng (Malaysia) Lim Yin Loo	15	21	17
3	(Singapore) Yao Lei (Singapore) Shinta Mulia Sari	21	15	21
(Philippines) Gelita Castilo (Philippines) Dia Nicole Magno	21	21
(Myanmar) Khine Zar Lin (Myanmar) Yee Le Le	13	14
Bye
2	(Indonesia) Nadya Melati (Indonesia) Vita Marissa

Quarterfinals
1	(Thailand) Duanganong Aroonkesorn (Thailand) Kunchala Voravichitchaikul	21	21
(Singapore) Chen Jiayuan (Singapore) Vanessa Neo	18	13
4	(Indonesia) Anneke Feinya Agustin (Indonesia) Nitya Krishinda Maheswari	24	21
(Malaysia) Vivian Hoo (Malaysia) Woon Khe Wei	22	15
(Thailand) Sapsiree Taerattanachai (Thailand) Savitree Amitrapai	17	18
3	(Singapore) Yao Lei (Singapore) Shinta Mulia Sari	21	21
(Philippines) Gelita Castilo (Philippines) Dia Nicole Magno	16	15
2	(Indonesia) Nadya Melati (Indonesia) Vita Marissa	21	21

Semifinals
1	(Thailand) Duanganong Aroonkesorn (Thailand) Kunchala Voravichitchaikul	13	10
4	(Indonesia) Anneke Feinya Agustin (Indonesia) Nitya Krishinda Maheswari	21	21
3	(Singapore) Yao Lei (Singapore) Shinta Mulia Sari	18	17
2	(Indonesia) Nadya Melati (Indonesia) Vita Marissa	21	21

Finals
4	(Indonesia) Anneke Feinya Agustin (Indonesia) Nitya Krishinda Maheswari	21	21
2	(Indonesia) Nadya Melati (Indonesia) Vita Marissa	19	17
