= Nadya Melati =

Indonesian badminton player

Personal information
- Born: 3 December 1986 (age 39) Jakarta, Indonesia

Sport
- Country: Indonesia
- Sport: Badminton
- Handedness: Right

Women's doubles
- Highest ranking: 10 (WD with Vita Marissa 17 November 2011)
- BWF profile
Medal record
Women's badminton
Representing Indonesia
SEA Games
Silver medal – second place	2011 Jakarta–Palembang	Women's doubles
Silver medal – second place	2011 Jakarta–Palembang	Women's team
Summer Universiade
Bronze medal – third place	2007 Bangkok	Mixed team

Nadya Melati (born 3 December 1986) is an Indonesian badminton player specializing in doubles. With her partner Vita Marissa, she became the runner-up in 2011 Indonesia Open after losing to Wang Xiaoli and Yu Yang.

== Achievements ==
=== SEA Games ===
Women's doubles
Year	Venue	Partner	Opponent	Score	Result
2011	Istora Senayan; Jakarta, Indonesia	(Indonesia) Vita Marissa	(Indonesia) Anneke Feinya Agustin (Indonesia) Nitya Krishinda Maheswari	19–21, 17–21	Silver

=== World University Championships ===
Women's doubles
Year	Venue	Partner	Opponent	Score	Result
2008	University of Minho, Campus de Gualtar; Braga, Portugal	(Indonesia) Devi Tika Permatasari	(Japan) Yui Nakahara (Japan) Mayu Sekiya	17–21, 21–10, 19–21	Bronze

=== ASEAN University Games ===
Women's doubles
Year	Venue	Partner	Opponent	Score	Result	Ref.
2008	Kuala Lumpur Badminton Stadium; Kuala Lumpur, Malaysia	(Indonesia) Nitya Krishinda Maheswari	(Malaysia) Amelia Alicia Anscelly (Malaysia) Woon Khe Wei	21–23, 18–21	Bronze	

=== BWF Superseries (1 runner-up) ===
The BWF Superseries, which was launched on 14 December 2006 and implemented in 2007, was a series of elite badminton tournaments, sanctioned by the Badminton World Federation (BWF). BWF Superseries levels were Superseries and Superseries Premier. A season of Superseries consisted of twelve tournaments around the world that had been introduced since 2011. Successful players were invited to the Superseries Finals, which were held at the end of each year.

Women's doubles
Year	Tournament	Partner	Opponent	Score	Result
2011	Indonesia Open	(Indonesia) Vita Marissa	(China) Wang Xiaoli (China) Yu Yang	12–21, 10–21	(silver) Runner-up

BWF Super Series Finals tournament
BWF Super Series Premier tournament
BWF Super Series tournament

=== BWF Grand Prix (2 runners-up) ===
The BWF Grand Prix had two levels, the Grand Prix and Grand Prix Gold. It was a series of badminton tournaments sanctioned by the Badminton World Federation (BWF) and played between 2007 and 2017.

Women's doubles
Year	Tournament	Partner	Opponent	Score	Result
2009	India Open	(Indonesia) Vita Marissa	(China) Ma Jin (China) Wang Xiaoli	14–21, 13–21	(silver) Runner-up
2009	India Grand Prix	(Indonesia) Devi Tika Permatasari	(Japan) Misaki Matsutomo (Japan) Ayaka Takahashi	14–21, 21–15, 15–21	(silver) Runner-up

BWF Grand Prix Gold tournament
BWF Grand Prix tournament

=== BWF International Challenge/Series ===
Women's doubles
Year	Tournament	Partner	Opponent	Score	Result
2005	India Satellite	(Indonesia) Nitya Krishinda Maheswari	(Iran) Nigin Amirpour (Iran) Behnaz Perzamanbin	15–1, 15–3	(gold) Winner
2005	Surabaya Satellite	(Indonesia) Nitya Krishinda Maheswari	(South Korea) Ha Jung-eun (South Korea) Kim Min-jung	13–15, 0–15	(silver) Runner-up
2006	Jakarta Satellite	(Indonesia) Nitya Krishinda Maheswari	(Indonesia) Meiliana Jauhari (Indonesia) Purwati	21–14, 21–17	(gold) Winner
2006	Cheers Asian Satellite	(Indonesia) Nitya Krishinda Maheswari	(Indonesia) Shendy Puspa Irawati (Indonesia) Devi Tika Permatasari	15–21, 21–17, 21–17	(gold) Winner
2006	Surabaya Satellite	(Indonesia) Nitya Krishinda Maheswari	(Indonesia) Meiliana Jauhari (Indonesia) Purwati	16–21, 18–21	(silver) Runner-up
2008	Singapore International	(Indonesia) Devi Tika Permatasari	(Singapore) Shinta Mulia Sari (Singapore) Yao Lei	21–14, 14–21, 13–21	(silver) Runner-up
2009	Indonesia International	(Indonesia) Vita Marissa	(Indonesia) Della Destiara Haris (Indonesia) Ni Made Claudia Ayu Wijaya	22–20, 21–16	(gold) Winner
2014	USM Indonesia International	(Indonesia) Dian Fitriani	(Indonesia) Komala Dewi (Indonesia) Meiliana Jauhari	14–21, 21–12, 21–17	(gold) Winner
2016	Indonesia International	(Indonesia) Dian Fitriani	(Indonesia) Apriyani Rahayu (Indonesia) Jauza Fadhila Sugiarto	21–12, 18–21, 20–22	(silver) Runner-up
2017	Indonesia International	(Indonesia) Dian Fitriani	(Malaysia) Soong Fie Cho (Malaysia) Tee Jing Yi	16–21, 21–16, 19–21	(silver) Runner-up

Mixed doubles
Year	Tournament	Partner	Opponent	Score	Result
2010	Indonesia International	(Indonesia) Trikusuma Wardhana	(Indonesia) Hendra Mulyono (Indonesia) Ayu Rahmasari	18–21, 21–14, 18–21	(silver) Runner-up

BWF International Challenge tournament
BWF International Series tournament

== Performance timeline ==
=== National team ===
- Senior level

Team event	2011
SEA Games	Silver

Team event	2007
Universiade	Bronze

=== Individual competitions ===
- Senior level

Event	2011	2012
SEA Games	Silver	—N/a
Asian Championships	A	R2
World Championships	QF	—N/a

Tournament	BWF World Tour		Best
Tournament	2018	2019	Best
Indonesia Masters	R1	R1	SF (2010)
Indonesia Open	R2	R2	F (2011)
Indonesia Masters Super 100	R1 (WD); QF (XD)	R2	QF (2018)
Year-end Ranking	131 (WD); 331 (XD)	149	10 (WD)

Tournament	BWF Superseries											Best
Tournament	2007	2008	2009	2010	2011	2012	2013	2014	2015	2016	2017	Best
All England Open	A					R1 (WD)	A		R1 (WD)	A		R1 (2012, 2015)
India Open	—N/a	GPG			A	R2 (WD)	A					F (2009)
Indonesia Open	R2 (WD)	A	R2 (WD)	R1 (WD)	F (WD)	R1 (WD); R1 (XD)	A		R1 (WD)	A	R2 (WD)	F (2011)
Malaysia Open	A				R1 (WD)	R1 (WD)	A	R1 (WD)	R1 (WD)	A	R1 (WD)	R1 (2011, 2012, 2014, 2015, 2017)
Singapore Open	A				QF (WD)	R2 (WD)	A	R1 (WD)	R1 (WD)	A	R1 (WD)	QF (2011)
China Masters	A				R2 (WD)	A		GPG				R2 (2011)
Japan Open	A			R2 (WD)	R1 (WD)	A						R2 (2010)
Korea Open	A				R2 (WD)	R2 (WD)	A					R2 (2011, 2012)
Denmark Open	A			R2 (WD); R1 (XD)	R2 (WD)	A						R2 (2010, 2011)
French Open	A			R1 (WD); R1 (XD)	QF (WD)	A		QF (WD)	A			QF (2011, 2014)
China Open	A				R1 (WD)	A						R1 (2011)
Hong Kong Open	A			R2 (WD)	A							R2 (2010)
Tournament	2007	2008	2009	2010	2011	2012	2013	2014	2015	2016	2017	Best

Tournament	BWF Grand Prix and Grand Prix Gold											Best
Tournament	2007	2008	2009	2010	2011	2012	2013	2014	2015	2016	2017	Best
India Open	—N/a	A	F (WD)	A	SS							F (2009)
Syed Modi International	—N/a		F (WD); QF (XD)	A	QF (WD)	A	—N/a	A				F (2009)
Malaysia Masters	—N/a		QF (WD)	SF (WD); R1 (XD)	R1 (WD); R1 (XD)	A			R2 (WD); R2 (XD)	A	R2 (WD); R1 (XD)	SF (2010)
Thailand Masters	—N/a									A	R2 (WD); QF (XD)	QF (2017)
German Open	R1	A				R1 (WD)	A					R1 (2007, 2012)
Swiss Open	SS				A	R2 (WD)	A		R1 (WD)	A		R2 (2012)
Australian Open	IS		A			QF (WD)	A	SS				QF (2012)
Chinese Taipei Open	A	QF (WD)	A		QF (WD)	A		SF (WD)	A			SF (2014)
Vietnam Open	QF (WD)	A	QF (WD); R1 (XD)	A				QF (WD); R1 (XD)	A			QF (2007, 2009, 2014)
Thailand Open	A	R2 (WD)	A	—N/a	R2 (WD); R1 (XD)	QF (WD); R2 (XD)	A	—N/a	A	R2 (WD)	R2 (WD)	QF (2012)
Dutch Open	A			R2 (WD)	A							R2 (2010)
Bitburger Open	A							QF (WD); R1 (XD)	A			QF (2014)
Macau Open	A	QF (WD)	A		R1 (WD)	A						QF (2008)
Indonesian Masters	—N/a			SF (WD); R2 (XD)	QF (WD)	R2 (WD)	R1 (WD)	R2 (WD)	R2 (WD); R1 (XD)	R1 (WD); R2 (XD)	—N/a	SF (2010)
Year-end Ranking			59 (WD); 193 (XD)	44 (WD); 82 (XD)	12 (WD); 204 (XD)	33 (WD); 162 (XD)	252 (WD); 328 (XD)	38 (WD); 551 (XD)	67 (WD); 318 (XD)	148 (WD); 316 (XD)	61 (WD); 175 (XD)	10 (WD)
Tournament	2007	2008	2009	2010	2011	2012	2013	2014	2015	2016	2017	Best
