= Badminton at the 2011 SEA Games =

- Venue: Istora Senayan
- Dates: 12–19 November 2011

Badminton at the 2011 SEA Games were held in Istora Senayan, Jakarta, Indonesia. A total of 7 events were contested at the Senayan Sport Complex.

== Medal summary ==
=== Medal table ===
* Host nation (Indonesia)

Rank	Nation	Gold	Silver	Bronze	Total
1	Indonesia*	5	4	2	11
2	Thailand	1	2	6	9
3	Singapore	1	0	4	5
4	Malaysia	0	1	2	3
Totals (4 entries)		7	7	14	28

=== Medalists ===
Event	Gold	Silver	Bronze
Men's singles	Simon Santoso; Indonesia	Tanongsak Saensomboonsuk; Thailand	Derek Wong; Singapore
Men's singles	Simon Santoso; Indonesia	Tanongsak Saensomboonsuk; Thailand	Taufik Hidayat; Indonesia
Women's singles	Fu Mingtian; Singapore	Adriyanti Firdasari; Indonesia	Porntip Buranaprasertsuk; Thailand
Women's singles	Fu Mingtian; Singapore	Adriyanti Firdasari; Indonesia	Ratchanok Intanon; Thailand
Men's doubles	Indonesia; Mohammad Ahsan; Bona Septano	Indonesia; Markis Kido; Hendra Setiawan	Malaysia; Goh V Shem; Lim Khim Wah
Men's doubles	Indonesia; Mohammad Ahsan; Bona Septano	Indonesia; Markis Kido; Hendra Setiawan	Thailand; Patiphat Chalardchaleam; Nipitphon Phuangphuapet
Women's doubles	Indonesia; Anneke Feinya Agustin; Nitya Krishinda Maheswari	Indonesia; Nadya Melati; Vita Marissa	Thailand; Duanganong Aroonkesorn; Kunchala Voravichitchaikul
Women's doubles	Indonesia; Anneke Feinya Agustin; Nitya Krishinda Maheswari	Indonesia; Nadya Melati; Vita Marissa	Singapore; Yao Lei; Shinta Mulia Sari
Mixed doubles	Indonesia; Tontowi Ahmad; Liliyana Natsir	Thailand; Sudket Prapakamol; Saralee Thungthongkam	Thailand; Songphon Anugritayawon; Kunchala Voravichitchaikul
Mixed doubles	Indonesia; Tontowi Ahmad; Liliyana Natsir	Thailand; Sudket Prapakamol; Saralee Thungthongkam	Indonesia; Muhammad Rijal; Debby Susanto
Men's team	Indonesia; Simon Santoso; Bona Septano; Mohammad Ahsan; Tommy Sugiarto; Hendra Setiawan; Markis Kido; Dionysius Hayom Rumbaka; Taufik Hidayat; Muhammad Rijal; Tontowi Ahmad	Malaysia; Liew Daren; Lim Khim Wah; Goh V Shem; Mohamad Arif Abdul Latif; Mak Hee Chun; Ong Soon Hock; Chong Wei Feng; Mohd Lutfi Zaim Abdul Khalid; Ong Jian Guo; Goh Soon Huat	Thailand; Tanongsak Saensomboonsuk; Sudket Prapakamol; Songphon Anugritayawon; Suppanyu Avihingsanon; Maneepong Jongjit; Bodin Isara; Pakkawat Vilailak; Pisit Poodchalat; Patiphat Chalardchaleam; Nipitphon Phuangphuapet
Men's team	Indonesia; Simon Santoso; Bona Septano; Mohammad Ahsan; Tommy Sugiarto; Hendra Setiawan; Markis Kido; Dionysius Hayom Rumbaka; Taufik Hidayat; Muhammad Rijal; Tontowi Ahmad	Malaysia; Liew Daren; Lim Khim Wah; Goh V Shem; Mohamad Arif Abdul Latif; Mak Hee Chun; Ong Soon Hock; Chong Wei Feng; Mohd Lutfi Zaim Abdul Khalid; Ong Jian Guo; Goh Soon Huat	Singapore; Derek Wong; Liu Yi; Terry Yeo; Ashton Chen; Chayut Triyachart; Huang Chao; Ngo Yi Chye; Johnathan Tang; Gerald Ong; Jeffrey Wong
Women's team	Thailand; Porntip Buranaprasertsuk; Duanganong Aroonkesorn; Kunchala Voravichitchaikul; Ratchanok Intanon; Savitree Amitrapai; Saralee Thungthongkam; Sapsiree Taerattanachai; Salakjit Ponsana; Nitchaon Jindapol; Nessara Somsri	Indonesia; Lindaweni Fanetri; Anneke Feinya Agustin; Nitya Krishinda Maheswari; Adriyanti Firdasari; Vita Marissa; Liliyana Natsir; Bellaetrix Manuputty; Maria Febe Kusumastuti; Nadya Melati; Debby Susanto	Malaysia; Tee Jing Yi; Vivian Hoo; Woon Khe Wei; Lyddia Cheah; Marylen Ng; Lim Yin Loo; Soniia Cheah Su Ya; Lai Pei Jing; Chong Sook Chin; Yang Li Lian
Women's team	Thailand; Porntip Buranaprasertsuk; Duanganong Aroonkesorn; Kunchala Voravichitchaikul; Ratchanok Intanon; Savitree Amitrapai; Saralee Thungthongkam; Sapsiree Taerattanachai; Salakjit Ponsana; Nitchaon Jindapol; Nessara Somsri	Indonesia; Lindaweni Fanetri; Anneke Feinya Agustin; Nitya Krishinda Maheswari; Adriyanti Firdasari; Vita Marissa; Liliyana Natsir; Bellaetrix Manuputty; Maria Febe Kusumastuti; Nadya Melati; Debby Susanto	Singapore; Gu Juan; Yao Lei; Shinta Mulia Sari; Fu Mingtian; Chen Jiayuan; Vanessa Neo; Xing Aiying; Liang Xiaoyu; Thng Ting Ting
