= Duanganong Aroonkesorn =

Thai badminton player (born 1984)

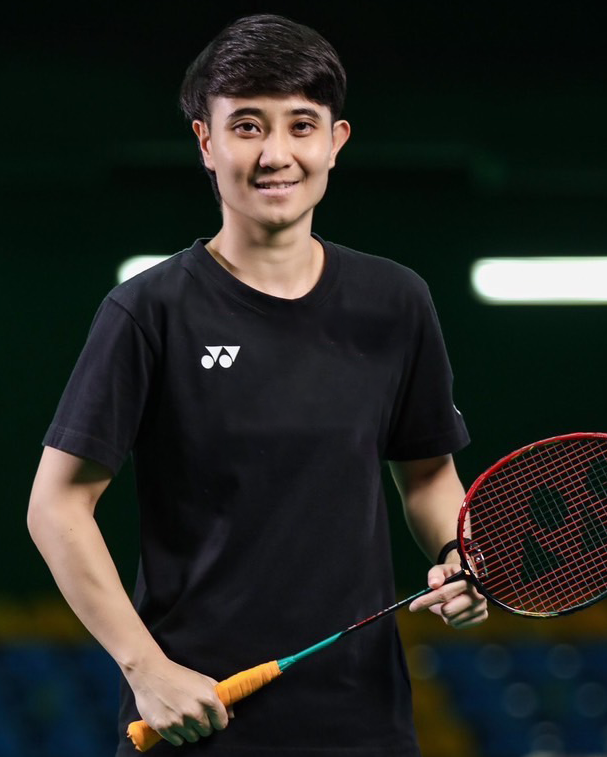

Personal information
- Born: 6 February 1984 (age 42) Bangkok, Thailand
- Height: 1.63 m (5 ft 4 in)
- Weight: 53 kg (117 lb)

Sport
- Country: Thailand
- Sport: Badminton
- Handedness: Right

Women's doubles
- Highest ranking: 4 (10 March 2011)
- BWF profile
Medal record
Women's badminton
Representing Thailand
Sudirman Cup
Bronze medal – third place	2013 Kuala Lumpur	Mixed team
Uber Cup
Bronze medal – third place	2012 Wuhan	Women's team
Asian Games
Silver medal – second place	2010 Guangzhou	Women's team
Asian Championships
Bronze medal – third place	2007 Johor Bahru	Women's doubles
Southeast Asian Games
Gold medal – first place	2005 Manila	Women's team
Gold medal – first place	2011 Jakarta–Palembang	Women's team
Gold medal – first place	2015 Singapore	Women's team
Silver medal – second place	2001 Kuala Lumpur	Women's team
Silver medal – second place	2003 Vietnam	Women's team
Bronze medal – third place	2001 Kuala Lumpur	Women's doubles
Bronze medal – third place	2007 Nakhon Ratchasima	Women's doubles
Bronze medal – third place	2007 Nakhon Ratchasima	Women's team
Bronze medal – third place	2009 Vientiane	Women's team
Bronze medal – third place	2011 Jakarta–Palembang	Women's doubles
Summer Universiade
Gold medal – first place	2007 Bangkok	Mixed team
Bronze medal – third place	2007 Bangkok	Women's doubles
World Junior Championships
Bronze medal – third place	2002 Pretoria	Women's doubles
Asian Junior Championships
Bronze medal – third place	2001 Taipei	Girls' doubles
Bronze medal – third place	2001 Taipei	Girls' team
Bronze medal – third place	2002 Kuala Lumpur	Girls' doubles

Duanganong Aroonkesorn (Thai: ดวงอนงค์ อรุณเกษร; born 6 February 1984) is an internationally elite badminton player from Thailand. She competed at the 2006, 2010 and 2014 Asian Games. Aroonkesorn is a women's doubles specialist who is paired with Kunchala Voravichitchaikul. Her best results with Voravichitchaikul have come in 2010 including a Superseries tournament victory at the 2010 French Open.

== Achievements ==
=== Asian Championships ===
Women's doubles
Year	Venue	Partner	Opponent	Score	Result
2007	Stadium Bandaraya; Johor Bahru, Malaysia	(Thailand) Kunchala Voravichitchaikul	(China) Cheng Shu (China) Zhao Yunlei	14–21, 6–21	Bronze

=== Southeast Asian Games ===
Women's doubles
Year	Venue	Partner	Opponent	Score	Result
2001	Malawati Stadium; Selangor, Malaysia	(Thailand) Kunchala Voravichitchaikul	(Malaysia) Ang Li Peng (Malaysia) Lim Pek Siah	4–15, 15–10, 6–15	Bronze
2007	Wongchawalitkul University; Nakhon Ratchasima, Thailand	(Thailand) Kunchala Voravichitchaikul	(Indonesia) Jo Novita (Indonesia) Greysia Polii	14–21, 21–18, 15–21	Bronze
2011	Istora Senayan; Jakarta, Indonesia	(Thailand) Kunchala Voravichitchaikul	(Indonesia) Anneke Feinya Agustin (Indonesia) Nitya Krishinda Maheswari	13–21, 10–21	Bronze

=== Summer Universiade ===
Women's doubles
Year	Venue	Partner	Opponent	Score	Result
2007	Thammasat University; Pathum Thani, Thailand	(Thailand) Kunchala Voravichitchaikul	(China) Pan Pan (China) Tian Qing	12–21, 18–21	Bronze

=== World Junior Championships ===
Girls' doubles
Year	Venue	Partner	Opponent	Score	Result
2002	Pretoria Showgrounds; Pretoria, South Africa	(Thailand) Kunchala Voravichitchaikul	(China) Chen Lanting (China) Yu Yang	2–11, 2–11	Bronze

=== Asian Junior Championships ===
Girls' doubles
Year	Venue	Partner	Opponent	Score	Result
2001	Taipei Gymnasium; Taipei, Taiwan	(Thailand) Kunchala Voravichitchaikul	(South Korea) Cho A-ra (South Korea) Hwang Yu-mi		Bronze
2002	Kuala Lumpur Badminton Stadium; Kuala Lumpur, Malaysia	(Thailand) Kunchala Voravichitchaikul	(China) Du Jing (China) Rong Lu	1–11, 4–11	Bronze

=== BWF Superseries ===
The BWF Superseries, which was launched on 14 December 2006 and implemented in 2007, is a series of elite badminton tournaments, sanctioned by the Badminton World Federation (BWF). BWF Superseries levels are Superseries and Superseries Premier. A season of Superseries consists of twelve tournaments around the world that have been introduced since 2011. Successful players are invited to the Superseries Finals, which are held at the end of each year.

Women's doubles
Year	Tournament	Partner	Opponent	Score	Result
2010	French Open	(Thailand) Kunchala Voravichitchaikul	(Bulgaria) Petya Nedelcheva (Russia) Anastasia Russkikh	21–16, 11–2 retired	(gold) Winner

BWF Super Series Finals tournament
BWF Super Series Premier tournament
BWF Super Series tournament

=== BWF Grand Prix ===
The BWF Grand Prix had two levels, the BWF Grand Prix and Grand Prix Gold. It was a series of badminton tournaments sanctioned by the Badminton World Federation (BWF) which was held from 2007 to 2017.

Women's doubles
Year	Tournament	Partner	Opponent	Score	Result
2010	Malaysia Grand Prix Gold	(Thailand) Kunchala Voravichitchaikul	(Malaysia) Ng Hui Ern (Malaysia) Ng Hui Lin	12–21, 21–17, 21–13	(gold) Winner
2011	Dutch Open	(Thailand) Kunchala Voravichitchaikul	(Singapore) Shinta Mulia Sari (Singapore) Yao Lei	21–10, 21–16	(gold) Winner

BWF Grand Prix Gold tournament
BWF Grand Prix tournament

=== BWF International Challenge/Series ===
Women's doubles
Year	Tournament	Partner	Opponent	Score	Result
2006	Vietnam Satellite	(Thailand) Kunchala Voravichitchaikul	(South Korea) Kim Min-jung (South Korea) Oh Seul-ki	21–23, 21–12, 9–21	(silver) Runner-up
2006	Thailand Asian Satellite	(Thailand) Kunchala Voravichitchaikul	(Japan) Yuko Matsuura (Japan) Nao Miyoshi	21–14, 21–15	(gold) Winner
2015	Thailand International	(Thailand) Kunchala Voravichitchaikul	(South Korea) Chae Yoo-jung (South Korea) Kim Ji-won	21–17, 21–19	(gold) Winner

BWF International Challenge tournament
BWF International Series tournament

== Record against selected opponents ==
Women's doubles results with Kunchala Voravichitchaikul against Superseries Final finalists, World Championships Semi-finalists, and Olympic quarterfinalists.

- (Australia) Leanne Choo & Renuga Veeran 1–0
- (Bulgaria) / (Russia) Petya Nedelcheva & Anastasia Russkikh 1–0
- (China) Cheng Shu & Zhao Yunlei 0–5
- (China) Du Jing & Yu Yang 0–4
- (China) Gao Ling & Huang Sui 0–1
- (China) Wang Xiaoli & Yu Yang 0–5
- (China) Wei Yili & Zhang Yawen 0–3
- (China) Bao Yixin & Zhong Qianxin 0–3
- (China) Xia Huan & Tang Jinhua 0–1
- (China) Tian Qing & Zhao Yunlei 0–1
- (China) Luo Ying & Luo Yu 0–1
- (China) Ma Jin & Tang Yuanting 0–1
- (Chinese Taipei) Cheng Wen-hsing & Chien Yu-chin 0–4
- (Denmark) Rikke Olsen & Mette Schjoldager 0–2
- (Denmark) Christinna Pedersen & Kamilla Rytter Juhl 0–4
- (England) Gail Emms & Donna Kellogg 0–3
- (Hong Kong) Poon Lok Yan & Tse Ying Suet 1–3
- (India) Jwala Gutta & Ashwini Ponnappa 0–1
- (Indonesia) Vita Marissa & Nadya Melati 1–2
- (Japan) Mizuki Fujii & Reika Kakiiwa 1–2
- (Japan) Miyuki Maeda & Satoko Suetsuna 2–10
- (Japan) Kumiko Ogura & Reiko Shiota 0–2
- (Japan) Shizuka Matsuo & Mami Naito 0–4
- (Japan) Misaki Matsutomo & Ayaka Takahashi 1–2
- (Japan) Reika Kakiiwa & Miyuki Maeda 0–3
- (South Korea) Lee Hyo-jung & Hwang Yu-mi 0–1
- (South Korea) Lee Hyo-jung & Lee Kyung-won 0–9
- (South Korea) Ha Jung-eun & Kim Min-jung 1–1
- (South Korea) Jung Kyung-eun & Kim Ha-na 0–2
- (Malaysia) Chin Eei Hui & Wong Pei Tty 0–5
- (Russia) Valeria Sorokina & Nina Vislova 1–2
- (Singapore) Jiang Yanmei & Li Yujia 1–2
- (Singapore) Shinta Mulia Sari & Yao Lei 2–0
