= Shinta Mulia Sari =

Indonesian badminton player (born 1988)

Personal information
- Born: 14 June 1988 (age 38) Jakarta, Indonesia
- Height: 1.64 m (5 ft 5 in)
- Weight: 58 kg (128 lb)

Sport
- Country: Singapore
- Sport: Badminton
- Handedness: Right
- Coached by: Eng Hian

Women's doubles
- Highest ranking: 8 (WD with Yao Lei 29 July 2010)
- BWF profile
Medal record
Women's badminton
Representing Singapore
Asian Games
Bronze medal – third place	2006 Doha	Women's team
Commonwealth Games
Silver medal – second place	2010 Delhi	Women's doubles
Bronze medal – third place	2014 Glasgow	Mixed team
SEA Games
Silver medal – second place	2005 Manila	Women's team
Silver medal – second place	2007 Nakhon Ratchasima	Women's team
Silver medal – second place	2009 Vientiane	Women's doubles
Bronze medal – third place	2009 Vientiane	Women's team
Bronze medal – third place	2011 Jakarta–Palembang	Women's doubles
Bronze medal – third place	2011 Jakarta–Palembang	Women's team
Bronze medal – third place	2013 Naypyidaw	Women's doubles
Bronze medal – third place	2015 Singapore	Women's team
Bronze medal – third place	2019 Philippines	Women's team

Shinta Mulia Sari (born 14 June 1988) is an Indonesian-born Singaporean former badminton player. She represented Singapore in the 2012 Summer Olympics, in the women's doubles with Yao Lei. She and Yao reached the quarter-finals of the 2014 Commonwealth Games, and were part of the Singaporean mixed team that won the bronze medal.

== Achievements ==
=== Commonwealth Games ===
Women's doubles
Year	Venue	Partner	Opponent	Score	Result
2010	Siri Fort Sports Complex; Delhi, India	(Singapore) Yao Lei	(India) Jwala Gutta (India) Ashwini Ponnappa	16–21, 19–21	Silver

=== SEA Games ===
Women's doubles
Year	Venue	Partner	Opponent	Score	Result
2009	Gym Hall 1, National Sports Complex; Vientiane, Laos	(Singapore) Yao Lei	(Malaysia) Chin Eei Hui (Malaysia) Wong Pei Tty	12–21, 11–21	Silver
2011	Istora Gelora Bung Karno; Jakarta, Indonesia	(Singapore) Yao Lei	(Indonesia) Nadya Melati (Indonesia) Vita Marissa	18–21, 17–21	Bronze
2013	Wunna Theikdi Indoor Stadium; Naypyidaw, Myanmar	(Singapore) Yao Lei	(Malaysia) Vivian Hoo (Malaysia) Woon Khe Wei	21–23, 21–17, 17–21	Bronze

=== BWF Superseries ===
The BWF Superseries, which was launched on 14 December 2006 and implemented in 2007, was a series of elite badminton tournaments, sanctioned by the Badminton World Federation (BWF). BWF Superseries levels were Superseries and Superseries Premier. A season of Superseries consisted of twelve tournaments around the world that had been introduced since 2011. Successful players were invited to the Superseries Finals, which were held at the end of each year.

Women's doubles
Year	Tournament	Partner	Opponent	Score	Result
2010	Singapore Open	(Singapore) Yao Lei	(South Korea) Kim Min-jung (South Korea) Lee Hyo-jung	21–17, 22–20	(gold) Winner

BWF Super Series Finals tournament
BWF Super Series Premier tournament
BWF Super Series tournament

=== BWF Grand Prix ===
The BWF Grand Prix had two levels, the Grand Prix and Grand Prix Gold. It was a series of badminton tournaments sanctioned by the Badminton World Federation (BWF) and played between 2007 and 2017.

Women's doubles
Year	Tournament	Partner	Opponent	Score	Result
2008	Vietnam Open	(Singapore) Yao Lei	(Indonesia) Shendy Puspa Irawati (Indonesia) Meiliana Jauhari	16–21, 21–19, 11–21	(silver) Runner-up
2010	India Open	(Singapore) Yao Lei	(India) Jwala Gutta (India) Ashwini Ponnappa	21–11, 9–21, 21–15	(gold) Winner
2011	Vietnam Open	(Singapore) Yao Lei	(Indonesia) Anneke Feinya Agustin (Indonesia) Nitya Krishinda Maheswari	21–23, 24–26	(silver) Runner-up
2011	Dutch Open	(Singapore) Yao Lei	(Thailand) Duanganong Aroonkesorn (Thailand) Kunchala Voravichitchaikul	10–21, 16–21	(silver) Runner-up
2011	Korea Grand Prix Gold	(Singapore) Yao Lei	(South Korea) Eom Hye-won (South Korea) Jang Ye-na	15–21, 16–21	(silver) Runner-up
2011	India Grand Prix Gold	(Singapore) Yao Lei	(Japan) Miyuki Maeda (Japan) Satoko Suetsuna	21–17, 21–18	(gold) Winner
2012	Malaysia Grand Prix Gold	(Singapore) Yao Lei	(Malaysia) Chin Eei Hui (Malaysia) Wong Pei Tty	18–21, 18–21	(silver) Runner-up

BWF Grand Prix Gold tournament
BWF Grand Prix tournament

=== BWF International Challenge/Series ===
Women's singles
Year	Tournament	Opponent	Score	Result
2005	Iran Fajr International	(Singapore) Li Li	9–11, 0–11	(silver) Runner-up

Women's doubles
Year	Tournament	Partner	Opponent	Score	Result
2004	Croatian International	(Singapore) Xing Aiying	(Singapore) Jiang Yanmei (Singapore) Li Yujia	4–15, 1–15	(silver) Runner-up
2005	Iran Fajr International	(Singapore) Frances Liu	(Iran) Golnaz Faezi (Iran) Behnaz Perzamanbin	15–8, 15–0	(gold) Winner
2005	Croatian International	(Singapore) Frances Liu	(Singapore) Fu Mingtian (Singapore) Zhang Beiwen	Walkover	(gold) Winner
2007	Ballarat International	(Singapore) Vanessa Neo	(Singapore) Yao Lei (Singapore) Frances Liu	14–21, 21–17, 21–15	(gold) Winner
2007	Waikato International	(Singapore) Vanessa Neo	(Singapore) Yao Lei (Singapore) Frances Liu	11–21, 21–18, 17–21	(silver) Runner-up
2008	Singapore International	(Singapore) Yao Lei	(Indonesia) Devi Tika Permatasari (Indonesia) Nadya Melati	14–21, 21–14, 21–13	(gold) Winner
2008	Vietnam International	(Singapore) Yao Lei	(Singapore) Frances Liu (Singapore) Vanessa Neo	15–21, 21–18, 16–21	(silver) Runner-up
2008	Indonesia International	(Singapore) Yao Lei	(Indonesia) Shendy Puspa Irawati (Indonesia) Meiliana Jauhari	14–21, 18–21	(silver) Runner-up
2009	Singapore International	(Singapore) Yao Lei	(South Korea) Jung Kyung-eun (South Korea) Kim Jin-ock	20–22, 21–18, 20–22	(silver) Runner-up
2010	Banuinvest International	(Singapore) Yao Lei	(Scotland) Jillie Cooper (Scotland) Emma Mason	21–8, 21–10	(gold) Winner
2010	Polish International	(Singapore) Yao Lei	(Hong Kong) Chan Tsz Ka (Hong Kong) Chau Hoi Wah	18–21, 21–16, 21–10	(gold) Winner
2011	Kharkiv International	(Singapore) Yao Lei	(Germany) Sandra Marinello (Germany) Birgit Michels	21–17, 18–21, 21–15	(gold) Winner
2011	Belgian International	(Singapore) Yao Lei	(England) Mariana Agathangelou (England) Heather Olver	21–12, 21–18	(gold) Winner
2013	Singapore International	(Singapore) Yao Lei	(Singapore) Fu Mingtian (Singapore) Vanessa Neo	19–21, 21–15, 21–13	(gold) Winner
2019	Mongolia International	(Singapore) Crystal Wong	(South Korea) Jang Eun-seo (South Korea) Jeong Na-eun	15–21, 21–19, 21–18	(gold) Winner

Mixed doubles
Year	Tournament	Partner	Opponent	Score	Result
2007	Ballarat International	(Singapore) Chayut Triyachart	(Singapore) Riky Widianto (Singapore) Vanessa Neo	19–21, 16–21	(silver) Runner-up
2007	Waikato International	(Singapore) Chayut Triyachart	(Singapore) Riky Widianto (Singapore) Vanessa Neo	21–16, 21–19	(gold) Winner
2008	Singapore International	(Singapore) Chayut Triyachart	(Singapore) Riky Widianto (Singapore) Yao Lei	17–21, 18–21	(silver) Runner-up

BWF International Challenge tournament
BWF International Series tournament
