= Yao Lei =

Singaporean badminton player (born 1990)

Yao Lei 姚蕾
Personal information
- Born: 24 February 1990 (age 36) Nantong, Jiangsu, China
- Height: 1.69 m (5 ft 7 in)
- Weight: 60 kg (132 lb)

Sport
- Country: Singapore
- Sport: Badminton
- Handedness: Right

Women's & mixed doubles
- Highest ranking: 8 (WD with Shinta Mulia Sari 29 July 2010); 16 (XD with Chayut Triyachart 23 September 2010)
- BWF profile
Medal record
Women's badminton
Representing Singapore
Commonwealth Games
Silver medal – second place	2010 Delhi	Women's doubles
Bronze medal – third place	2010 Delhi	Mixed doubles
Bronze medal – third place	2014 Glasgow	Mixed team
Southeast Asian Games
Silver medal – second place	2007 Nakhon Ratchasima	Women's team
Silver medal – second place	2009 Vientiane	Women's doubles
Bronze medal – third place	2009 Vientiane	Women's team
Bronze medal – third place	2011 Jakarta–Palembang	Women's doubles
Bronze medal – third place	2011 Jakarta–Palembang	Women's team
Bronze medal – third place	2013 Naypyidaw	Women's doubles
World Junior Championships
Gold medal – first place	2008 Pune	Girls' doubles
Bronze medal – third place	2007 Waitakere City	Mixed team
Asian Junior Championships
Bronze medal – third place	2007 Kuala Lumpur	Girls' doubles

Yao Lei (born 24 February 1990) is a Singaporean former badminton player.

== Early life ==
In 2003, as a 13-year-old Yao emigrated to Singapore under the Foreign Sports Talent Scheme. Her parents Yao Yiping and Gu Xiaojing were both former international badminton players.

== Career ==
Yao won the women's doubles silver and mixed doubles bronze at the 2010 Delhi Commonwealth Games. She also represented Singapore in the 2012 Summer Olympics in London with Shinta Mulia Sari.

Yao retired from competitive badminton in 2014, citing a lack of passion and drive. Yao had enrolled at Soochow University in China for a degree in sports training.

In 2018, Yao finished her studies. She participated in the 2018 Singapore Open, pairing with Lim Ming Hui in the women's doubles and Malaysian Tan Boon Heong in the mixed doubles.

== Achievements ==
=== Commonwealth Games ===
Women's doubles
Year	Venue	Partner	Opponent	Score	Result
2010	Siri Fort Sports Complex; Delhi, India	(Singapore) Shinta Mulia Sari	(India) Jwala Gutta (India) Ashwini Ponnappa	16–21, 19–21	Silver

Mixed doubles
Year	Venue	Partner	Opponent	Score	Result
2010	Siri Fort Sports Complex; Delhi, India	(Singapore) Chayut Triyachart	(Malaysia) Chan Peng Soon (Malaysia) Goh Liu Ying	21–14, 17–21, 21–17	Bronze

=== Southeast Asian Games ===
Women's doubles
Year	Venue	Partner	Opponent	Score	Result
2009	Gym Hall 1, National Sports Complex; Vientiane, Laos	(Singapore) Shinta Mulia Sari	(Malaysia) Chin Eei Hui (Malaysia) Wong Pei Tty	12–21, 11–21	Silver
2011	Istora Senayan; Jakarta, Indonesia	(Singapore) Shinta Mulia Sari	(Indonesia) Vita Marissa (Indonesia) Nadya Melati	18–21, 17–21	Bronze
2013	Wunna Theikdi Indoor Stadium; Naypyidaw, Myanmar	(Singapore) Shinta Mulia Sari	(Malaysia) Vivian Hoo (Malaysia) Woon Khe Wei	21–23, 21–17, 17–21	Bronze

=== BWF World Junior Championships ===
Girls' doubles
Year	Venue	Partner	Opponent	Score	Result
2008	Shree Shiv Chhatrapati Badminton Hall; Pune, India	(Singapore) Fu Mingtian	(China) Xie Jing (China) Zhong Qianxin	21–19, 21–17	Gold

=== Asian Junior Championships ===
Girls' doubles
Year	Venue	Partner	Opponent	Score	Result
2007	Stadium Juara, Kuala Lumpur, Malaysia	(Singapore) Fu Mingtian	(Indonesia) Richi Puspita Dili (Indonesia) Debby Susanto	10–21, 17–21	Bronze

=== BWF Superseries ===
The BWF Superseries, which was launched on 14 December 2006 and implemented in 2007, was a series of elite badminton tournaments, sanctioned by the Badminton World Federation (BWF). BWF Superseries levels were Superseries and Superseries Premier. A season of Superseries consisted of twelve tournaments around the world that had been introduced since 2011. Successful players were invited to the Superseries Finals, which were held at the end of each year.

Women's doubles
Year	Tournament	Partner	Opponent	Score	Result
2010	Singapore Open	(Singapore) Shinta Mulia Sari	(South Korea) Kim Min-jung (South Korea) Lee Hyo-jung	21–17, 22–20	(gold) Winner

BWF Super Series Finals tournament
BWF Super Series Premier tournament
BWF Super Series tournament

=== BWF Grand Prix ===
The BWF Grand Prix had two levels, the Grand Prix and Grand Prix Gold. It was a series of badminton tournaments sanctioned by the Badminton World Federation (BWF) and played between 2007 and 2017.

Women's doubles
Year	Tournament	Partner	Opponent	Score	Result
2008	Vietnam Open	(Singapore) Shinta Mulia Sari	(Indonesia) Shendy Puspa Irawati (Indonesia) Meiliana Jauhari	16–21, 21–19, 11–21	(silver) Runner-up
2010	India Open	(Singapore) Shinta Mulia Sari	(India) Jwala Gutta (India) Ashwini Ponnappa	21–11, 9–21, 21–15	(gold) Winner
2011	Vietnam Open	(Singapore) Shinta Mulia Sari	(Indonesia) Anneke Feinya Agustin (Indonesia) Nitya Krishinda Maheswari	21–23, 24–26	(silver) Runner-up
2011	Dutch Open	(Singapore) Shinta Mulia Sari	(Thailand) Duanganong Aroonkesorn (Thailand) Kunchala Voravichitchaikul	10–21, 16–21	(silver) Runner-up
2011	Korea Grand Prix Gold	(Singapore) Shinta Mulia Sari	(South Korea) Eom Hye-won (South Korea) Jang Ye-na	15–21, 16–21	(silver) Runner-up
2011	India Grand Prix Gold	(Singapore) Shinta Mulia Sari	(Japan) Miyuki Maeda (Japan) Satoko Suetsuna	21–17, 21–18	(gold) Winner
2012	Malaysia Grand Prix Gold	(Singapore) Shinta Mulia Sari	(Malaysia) Chin Eei Hui (Malaysia) Wong Pei Tty	18–21, 18–21	(silver) Runner-up

Mixed doubles
Year	Tournament	Partner	Opponent	Score	Result
2010	India Open	(Singapore) Chayut Triyachart	(India) Valiyaveetil Diju (India) Jwala Gutta	21–23, 22–20, 7–21	(silver) Runner-up

BWF Grand Prix Gold tournament
BWF Grand Prix tournament

=== BWF International Challenge/Series ===
Women's doubles
Year	Tournament	Partner	Opponent	Score	Result
2007	Ballarat International	(Singapore) Frances Liu	(Singapore) Shinta Mulia Sari (Singapore) Vanessa Neo	21–14, 17–21, 15–21	(silver) Runner-up
2007	Waikato International	(Singapore) Frances Liu	(Singapore) Shinta Mulia Sari (Singapore) Vanessa Neo	21–11, 18–21, 21–17	(gold) Winner
2008	Singapore International	(Singapore) Shinta Mulia Sari	(Indonesia) Nadya Melati (Indonesia) Devi Tika Permatasari	14–21, 21–14, 21–13	(gold) Winner
2008	Vietnam International	(Singapore) Shinta Mulia Sari	(Singapore) Frances Liu (Singapore) Vanessa Neo	15–21, 21–18, 16–21	(silver) Runner-up
2008	Indonesia International	(Singapore) Shinta Mulia Sari	(Indonesia) Shendy Puspa Irawati (Indonesia) Meiliana Jauhari	14–21, 18–21	(silver) Runner-up
2009	Singapore International	(Singapore) Shinta Mulia Sari	(South Korea) Jung Kyung-eun (South Korea) Kim Jin-ock	20–22, 21–18, 20–22	(silver) Runner-up
2010	Banuinvest International	(Singapore) Shinta Mulia Sari	(Scotland) Jillie Cooper (Scotland) Emma Mason	21–8, 21–10	(gold) Winner
2010	Polish International	(Singapore) Shinta Mulia Sari	(Hong Kong) Chan Tsz Ka (Hong Kong) Chau Hoi Wah	18–21, 21–16, 21–10	(gold) Winner
2011	Kharkiv International	(Singapore) Shinta Mulia Sari	(Germany) Sandra Marinello (Germany) Birgit Michels	21–17, 18–21, 21–15	(gold) Winner
2011	Belgian International	(Singapore) Shinta Mulia Sari	(England) Mariana Agathangelou (England) Heather Olver	21–12, 21–18	(gold) Winner
2013	Singapore International	(Singapore) Shinta Mulia Sari	(Singapore) Fu Mingtian (Singapore) Vanessa Neo	19–21, 21–15, 21–13	(gold) Winner

Mixed doubles
Year	Tournament	Partner	Opponent	Score	Result
2008	Singapore International	(Singapore) Riky Widianto	(Singapore) Chayut Triyachart (Singapore) Shinta Mulia Sari	21–17, 21–18	(gold) Winner
2008	Indonesia International	(Singapore) Chayut Triyachart	(Indonesia) Fran Kurniawan (Indonesia) Shendy Puspa Irawati	19–21, 13–21	(silver) Runner-up
2010	Banuinvest International	(Singapore) Chayut Triyachart	(Belgium) Wouter Claes (Belgium) Nathalie Descamps	21–13, 23–21	(gold) Winner
2010	Polish International	(Singapore) Chayut Triyachart	(Russia) Andrey Ashmarin (Russia) Anastasia Prokopenko	12–21, 17–21	(silver) Runner-up
2011	Kharkiv International	(Singapore) Chayut Triyachart	(Germany) Michael Fuchs (Germany) Birgit Michels	18–21, 14–21	(silver) Runner-up
2011	Belgian International	(Singapore) Chayut Triyachart	(Netherlands) Jorrit de Ruiter (Netherlands) Selena Piek	23–25, 21–16, 21–14	(gold) Winner

BWF International Challenge tournament
BWF International Series tournament
