= Kunchala Voravichitchaikul =

Thai badminton player (born 1984)

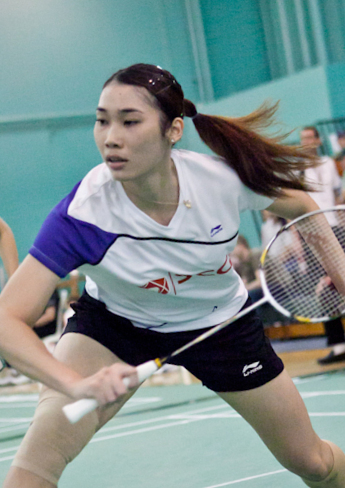

Personal information
- Born: 14 November 1984 (age 41) Bangkok, Thailand
- Height: 1.63 m (5 ft 4 in)
- Weight: 58 kg (128 lb)

Sport
- Country: Thailand
- Sport: Badminton
- Handedness: Right

Women's & mixed doubles
- Highest ranking: 4 (WD, 10 March 2011); 6 (XD, 5 May 2011)
- BWF profile
Medal record
Women's badminton
Representing Thailand
Sudirman Cup
Bronze medal – third place	2013 Kuala Lumpur	Mixed team
Uber Cup
Bronze medal – third place	2012 Wuhan	Women's team
Asian Games
Silver medal – second place	2010 Guangzhou	Women's team
Asian Championships
Bronze medal – third place	2007 Johor Bahru	Women's doubles
Southeast Asian Games
Gold medal – first place	2005 Manila	Women's team
Gold medal – first place	2011 Jakarta–Palembang	Women's team
Gold medal – first place	2015 Singapore	Women's team
Silver medal – second place	2001 Kuala Lumpur	Women's team
Silver medal – second place	2003 Vietnam	Women's team
Silver medal – second place	2009 Vientiane	Mixed doubles
Bronze medal – third place	2001 Kuala Lumpur	Women's doubles
Bronze medal – third place	2007 Nakhon Ratchasima	Women's doubles
Bronze medal – third place	2007 Nakhon Ratchasima	Women's team
Bronze medal – third place	2009 Vientiane	Women's team
Bronze medal – third place	2011 Jakarta–Palembang	Women's doubles
Bronze medal – third place	2011 Jakarta–Palembang	Mixed doubles
Summer Universiade
Gold medal – first place	2007 Bangkok	Mixed team
Bronze medal – third place	2007 Bangkok	Women's doubles
World Junior Championships
Bronze medal – third place	2002 Pretoria	Women's doubles
Asian Junior Championships
Bronze medal – third place	2001 Taipei	Girls' doubles
Bronze medal – third place	2001 Taipei	Girls' team
Bronze medal – third place	2002 Kuala Lumpur	Girls' doubles

Kunchala Voravichitchaikul (Thai: กุลชลา วรวิจิตรชัยกุล; born 14 November 1984) is an internationally elite badminton player from Thailand. She competed at the 2006, 2010 and 2014 Asian Games.

Kunchala Voravichitchaikul is a doubles specialist who is paired with Duanganong Aroonkesorn in women's doubles and Songphon Anugritayawon in mixed doubles. She is a veteran of one World Championship, the 2010 Paris Worlds where she failed to make the quarter-finals in both events. (She also entered the 2009 Hyderabad Worlds with Anugritayawon, but withdrew before competition began.) Her best tournament results so far are at the 2010 French Open where she won the women's doubles title with Aroonkesorn, and the 2009 Japan Open, where she and Anugritayawon won the mixed doubles title. She announced her retirement in 2015.

== Achievements ==
=== Asian Championships ===
Women's doubles
Year	Venue	Partner	Opponent	Score	Result
2007	Stadium Bandaraya; Johor Bahru, Malaysia	(Thailand) Duanganong Aroonkesorn	(China) Cheng Shu (China) Zhao Yunlei	14–21, 6–21	Bronze

=== Southeast Asian Games ===
Women's doubles
Year	Venue	Partner	Opponent	Score	Result
2001	Malawati Stadium; Selangor, Malaysia	(Thailand) Duanganong Aroonkesorn	(Malaysia) Ang Li Peng (Malaysia) Lim Pek Siah	4–15, 15–10, 6–15	Bronze
2007	Wongchawalitkul University; Nakhon Ratchasima, Thailand	(Thailand) Duanganong Aroonkesorn	(Indonesia) Jo Novita (Indonesia) Greysia Polii	14–21, 21–18, 15–21	Bronze
2011	Istora Senayan; Jakarta, Indonesia	(Thailand) Duanganong Aroonkesorn	(Indonesia) Anneke Feinya Agustin (Indonesia) Nitya Krishinda Maheswari	13–21, 10–21	Bronze

Mixed doubles
Year	Venue	Partner	Opponent	Score	Result
2009	Gym Hall 1, National Sports Complex; Vientiane, Laos	(Thailand) Songphon Anugritayawon	(Indonesia) Nova Widianto (Indonesia) Lilyana Natsir	10–21, 22–20, 9–21	Silver
2011	Istora Senayan; Jakarta, Indonesia	(Thailand) Songphon Anugritayawon	(Indonesia) Tontowi Ahmad (Indonesia) Lilyana Natsir	19–21, 14–21	Bronze

=== Summer Universiade ===
Women's doubles
Year	Venue	Partner	Opponent	Score	Result
2007	Thammasat University; Pathum Thani, Thailand	(Thailand) Duanganong Aroonkesorn	(China) Pan Pan (China) Tian Qing	12–21, 18–21	Bronze

=== World Junior Championships ===
Girls' doubles
Year	Venue	Partner	Opponent	Score	Result
2002	Pretoria Showgrounds; Pretoria, South Africa	(Thailand) Duanganong Aroonkesorn	(China) Chen Lanting (China) Yu Yang	2–11, 2–11	Bronze

=== Asian Junior Championships ===
Girls' doubles
Year	Venue	Partner	Opponent	Score	Result
2001	Taipei Gymnasium; Taipei, Taiwan	(Thailand) Duanganong Aroonkesorn	(South Korea) Cho A-ra (South Korea) Hwang Yu-mi		Bronze
2002	Kuala Lumpur Badminton Stadium; Kuala Lumpur, Malaysia	(Thailand) Duanganong Aroonkesorn	(China) Du Jing (China) Rong Lu	1–11, 4–11	Bronze

=== BWF Superseries ===
The BWF Superseries, which was launched on 14 December 2006 and implemented in 2007, is a series of elite badminton tournaments, sanctioned by the Badminton World Federation (BWF). BWF Superseries levels are Superseries and Superseries Premier. A season of Superseries consists of twelve tournaments around the world that have been introduced since 2011. Successful players are invited to the Superseries Finals, which are held at the end of each year.

Women's doubles
Year	Tournament	Partner	Opponent	Score	Result
2010	French Open	(Thailand) Duanganong Aroonkesorn	(Bulgaria) Petya Nedelcheva (Russia) Anastasia Russkikh	21–16, 11–2 retired	(gold) Winner

Mixed doubles
Year	Tournament	Partner	Opponent	Score	Result
2009	Korea Open	(Thailand) Songphon Anugritayawon	(South Korea) Lee Yong-dae (South Korea) Lee Hyo-jung	8–21, 7–21	(silver) Runner-up
2009	Japan Open	(Thailand) Songphon Anugritayawon	(Denmark) Joachim Fischer Nielsen (Denmark) Christinna Pedersen	13–21, 21–16, 22–20	(gold) Winner

BWF Super Series Finals tournament
BWF Super Series Premier tournament
BWF Super Series tournament

=== BWF Grand Prix ===
The BWF Grand Prix had two levels, the BWF Grand Prix and Grand Prix Gold. It was a series of badminton tournaments sanctioned by the Badminton World Federation (BWF) which was held from 2007 to 2017.

Women's doubles
Year	Tournament	Partner	Opponent	Score	Result
2010	Malaysia Grand Prix Gold	(Thailand) Duanganong Aroonkesorn	(Malaysia) Ng Hui Ern (Malaysia) Ng Hui Lin	12–21, 21–17, 21–13	(gold) Winner
2011	Dutch Open	(Thailand) Duanganong Aroonkesorn	(Singapore) Shinta Mulia Sari (Singapore) Yao Lei	21–10, 21–16	(gold) Winner

Mixed doubles
Year	Tournament	Partner	Opponent	Score	Result
2009	Thailand Open	(Thailand) Songphon Anugritayawon	(Thailand) Sudket Prapakamol (Thailand) Saralee Thoungthongkam	11–21, 21–17, 21–14	(gold) Winner
2011	Australian Open	(Thailand) Songphon Anugritayawon	(Japan) Hirokatsu Hashimoto (Japan) Mizuki Fujii	21–15, 21–9	(gold) Winner
2011	Dutch Open	(Thailand) Songphon Anugritayawon	(Thailand) Sudket Prapakamol (Thailand) Saralee Thoungthongkam	21–17, 24–22	(gold) Winner

BWF Grand Prix Gold tournament
BWF Grand Prix tournament

=== BWF International Challenge/Series ===
Women's doubles
Year	Tournament	Partner	Opponent	Score	Result
2006	Vietnam Satellite	(Thailand) Duanganong Aroonkesorn	(South Korea) Kim Min-jung (South Korea) Oh Seul-ki	21–23, 21–12, 9–21	(silver) Runner-up
2006	Thailand Asian Satellite	(Thailand) Duanganong Aroonkesorn	(Japan) Yuko Matsuura (Japan) Nao Miyoshi	21–14, 21–15	(gold) Winner
2015	Thailand International	(Thailand) Duanganong Aroonkesorn	(South Korea) Chae Yoo-jung (South Korea) Kim Ji-won	21–17, 21–19	(gold) Winner

Mixed doubles
Year	Tournament	Partner	Opponent	Score	Result
2003	Singapore Satellite	(Thailand) Nuttaphon Narkthong	(Singapore) Hendri Kurniawan Saputra (Singapore) Li Yujia	14–17, 2–15	(silver) Runner-up
2006	Vietnam Satellite	(Thailand) Songphon Anugritayawon	(Malaysia) Mohammed Razif Abdul Latif (Malaysia) Norshahliza Baharum	21–13, 21–10	(gold) Winner
2006	Thailand Asian Satellite	(Thailand) Songphon Anugritayawon	(Indonesia) Lingga Lie (Indonesia) Yulianti	21–16, 10–21, 17–21	(silver) Runner-up

BWF International Challenge tournament
BWF International Series tournament

== Record against selected opponents ==
Mixed doubles results with Songphon Anugritayawon against Superseries Final finalists, World Championships semi-finalists, and Olympic quarterfinalists.

- (China) He Hanbin & Yu Yang 0–3
- (China) Tao Jiaming & Ma Jin 0–1
- (China) Tao Jiaming & Tian Qing 0–1
- (China) Xu Chen & Yu Yang 0–2
- (China) Zhang Nan & Zhao Yunlei 1–0
- (China) Zheng Bo & Gao Ling 0–1
- (China) Zhang Jun & Gao Ling 1–1
- (China) Xu Chen & Ma Jin 0–3
- (China) Xie Zhongbo & Zhang Yawen 0–3
- (Chinese Taipei) Lee Sheng-mu & Chien Yu-chin 0–1
- (Chinese Taipei) Chen Hung-ling & Cheng Wen-hsing 0–3
- (Denmark) Joachim Fischer Nielsen & Christinna Pedersen 2–2
- (Denmark) Thomas Laybourn & Kamilla Rytter Juhl 0–2
- (Denmark) Lars Paaske & Mette Schjoldager 0–1
- (England) Anthony Clark & Donna Kellogg 1–2
- (England) Nathan Robertson & Jenny Wallwork 1–1
- (England) Nathan Robertson & Gail Emms 0–1
- (England) / (Scotland) Chris Adcock & Imogen Bankier 1–1
- (Germany) Michael Fuchs & Birgit Michels 1–0
- (Indonesia) Flandy Limpele & Vita Marissa 1–0
- (Indonesia) Nova Widianto & Liliyana Natsir 0–5
- (Indonesia) / (Russia) Hendra Setiawan & Anastasia Russkikh 0–1
- (Indonesia) Tontowi Ahmad & Liliyana Natsir 0–2
- (Indonesia) Fran Kurniawan & Pia Zebadiah Bernadet 0–1
- (South Korea) Lee Yong-dae & Lee Hyo-jung 0–5
- (South Korea) Ko Sung-hyun & Ha Jung-eun 0–1
- (Malaysia) Koo Kien Keat & Wong Pei Tty 0–1
- (Malaysia) Chan Peng Soon & Goh Liu Ying 2–1
- (Poland) Robert Mateusiak & Nadieżda Zięba 1–0
- (Thailand) Sudket Prapakamol & Saralee Thungthongkam 3–1
