= Anneke Feinya Agustin =

Indonesian badminton player (born 1991)

Personal information
- Born: 11 August 1991 (age 35) Yogyakarta, Indonesia

Sport
- Country: Indonesia
- Sport: Badminton
- Handedness: Right

Women's & mixed doubles
- Highest ranking: 17 (WD with Nitya Krishinda Maheswari 19 January 2012)
- BWF profile
Medal record
Women's badminton
Representing Indonesia
Sudirman Cup
Bronze medal – third place	2011 Qingdao	Mixed team
Uber Cup
Bronze medal – third place	2010 Kuala Lumpur	Women's team
SEA Games
Gold medal – first place	2011 Jakarta–Palembang	Women's doubles
Silver medal – second place	2011 Jakarta–Palembang	Women's team
World Junior Championships
Bronze medal – third place	2008 Pune	Girls' doubles

Anneke Feinya Agustin (born 11 August 1991) is an Indonesian former badminton player specializing in doubles. She had shown her achievements in badminton together with Nitya Krishinda Maheswari. The duo seize the women's doubles gold medal at the 2011 SEA Games. She decided to stop from national training camp since 2014 due to injury.

== Achievements ==
=== SEA Games ===
Women's doubles
Year	Venue	Partner	Opponent	Score	Result
2011	Istora Senayan; Jakarta, Indonesia	(Indonesia) Nitya Krishinda Maheswari	(Indonesia) Vita Marissa (Indonesia) Nadya Melati	21–19, 21–17	Gold

=== BWF World Junior Championships ===
Girls' doubles
Year	Venue	Partner	Opponent	Score	Result
2008	Shree Shiv Chhatrapati Badminton Hall; Pune, India	(Indonesia) Annisa Wahyuni	(China) Xie Jing (China) Zhong Qianxin	19–21, 20–22	Bronze

=== BWF Grand Prix (3 titles) ===
The BWF Grand Prix had two levels, the Grand Prix and Grand Prix Gold. It was a series of badminton tournaments sanctioned by the Badminton World Federation (BWF) and played between 2007 and 2017.

Women's doubles
Year	Tournament	Partner	Opponent	Score	Result
2009	New Zealand Open	(Indonesia) Annisa Wahyuni	(Hong Kong) Chan Tsz Ka (Hong Kong) Tse Ying Suet	21–19, 21–17	(gold) Winner
2009	Vietnam Open	(Indonesia) Annisa Wahyuni	(Thailand) Savitree Amitrapai (Thailand) Vacharaporn Munkit	21–14, 21–13	(gold) Winner
2011	Vietnam Open	(Indonesia) Nitya Krishinda Maheswari	(Singapore) Shinta Mulia Sari (Singapore) Yao Lei	23–21, 26–24	(gold) Winner

BWF Grand Prix Gold tournament
BWF Grand Prix tournament
