= 2012 All England Super Series Premier =

Badminton championships

2012 All England Super Series
Tournament details
- Dates: March 6, 2012 - March 11, 2012
- Level: Super Series Premier
- Total prize money: US$350,000
- Location: Birmingham, England

Champions
- Men's singles: (China) Lin Dan
- Women's singles: (China) Li Xuerui
- Men's doubles: (South Korea) Jung Jae-sung (South Korea) Lee Yong-dae
- Women's doubles: (China) Tian Qing (China) Zhao Yunlei
- Mixed doubles: (Indonesia) Tontowi Ahmad (Indonesia) Liliyana Natsir

The 2012 All England Super Series Premier was the third super series tournament of the 2012 BWF Super Series. The tournament was held in Birmingham, England from 6–11 March 2012 and had a total purse of $350,000.

== Men's singles ==
=== Seeds ===
1. (Malaysia) Lee Chong Wei (Final)
2. (China) Lin Dan (Winner)
3. (China) Chen Long (Quarter-finals)
4. (Denmark) Peter Gade (First round)
5. (China) Chen Jin (Second round)
6. (Japan) Sho Sasaki (Second round)
7. (Japan) Kenichi Tago (Semi-finals)
8. (South Korea) Lee Hyun-il (Semi-finals)

=== Top half ===
First round
1	(Malaysia) Lee C W	21	21
(China) Wang ZM	16	11
(Indonesia) S Santoso	14	21	7
(Denmark) H-K Vittinghus	21	8	21
6	(Japan) S Sasaki	21	21
(Denmark) J Ø Jørgensen	18	19
(Indonesia) D H Rumbaka	21	15	21
(China) Du PY	16	21	19
4	(Denmark) P Gade	21	16	14
(England) R Ouseph	17	21	21
(Thailand) B Ponsana	19	21
Q3	(Malaysia) D Liew	21	23
8	(South Korea) Lee H-i	21	21
Q2	(Chinese Taipei) Chou T-c	11	13
(India) K Parupalli	13	21	9
(Germany) M Zwiebler	21	15	21

Second round
1	(Malaysia) Lee C W	23	21
(Denmark) H-K Vittinghus	21	18
6	(Japan) S Sasaki	17	17
(Indonesia) D H Rumbaka	21	21
(England) R Ouseph	15	10
Q3	(Malaysia) D Liew	21	21
8	(South Korea) Lee H-i	21	21
(Germany) M Zwiebler	17	6

Quarterfinals
1	(Malaysia) Lee C W	21	21
(Indonesia) D H Rumbaka	9	11
Q3	(Malaysia) D Liew	15	13
8	(South Korea) Lee H-i	21	21

Semifinals
1	(Malaysia) Lee C W	21	21
8	(South Korea) Lee H-i	19	18

=== Bottom half ===
First round
(Japan) K Yamada	14	21	21
(South Korea) Son W-h	21	12	15
Q1	(Denmark) V Axelsen	12	22
7	(Japan) K Tago	21	24
(Hong Kong) Hu Y	12	18
(Vietnam) Nguyen T M	21	21
(Indonesia) T Sugiarto	21	16	0^{r}
3	(China) Chen L	18	21	0
(Indonesia) T Hidayat	25	21
(Guatemala) K Cordón	23	17
(Hong Kong) Wong W K	13	11
5	(China) Chen J	21	21
(Spain) P Abian	14	18
Q4	(Malaysia) Chong W F	21	21
(India) A Jayaram	18	15
2	(China) Lin D	21	21

Second round
(Japan) K Yamada	17	14
7	(Japan) K Tago	21	21
(Vietnam) Nguyen T M	21	9	16
3	(China) Chen L	19	21	21
(Indonesia) T Hidayat	21	21
5	(China) Chen J	19	19
Q4	(Malaysia) Chong W F	13	16
2	(China) Lin D	21	21

Quarterfinals
7	(Japan) K Tago	22	21	21
3	(China) Chen L	24	12	14
(Indonesia) T Hidayat	18	8
2	(China) Lin D	21	21

Semifinals
7	(Japan) K Tago	18	17
2	(China) Lin D	21	21

=== Finals ===
Semifinals
1	(Malaysia) Lee Chong Wei	21	21
8	(South Korea) Lee Hyun-il	19	18
7	(Japan) Kenichi Tago	18	17
2	(China) Lin Dan	21	21

Final
1	(Malaysia) Lee Chong Wei	19	2^{r}
2	(China) Lin Dan	21	6

== Women's singles ==
=== Seeds ===
1. (China) Wang Yihan (Finals)
2. (China) Wang Xin (First round)
3. (China) Wang Shixian (Semi-finals)
4. (India) Saina Nehwal (Quarter-finals)
5. (Denmark) Tine Baun (Quarter-finals)
6. (China) Jiang Yanjiao (Quarter-finals)
7. (China) Li Xuerui (Winner)
8. (Germany) Juliane Schenk (Second round)

=== Top half ===
First round
1	(China) Wang YH	21	21
(Chinese Taipei) Pai H-m	10	8
(China) Liu X	24	19	21
(Canada) M Li	22	21	11
5	(Denmark) T Baun	21	21
(Singapore) Fu MT	15	15
(Japan) A Goto	21	21
(Netherlands) Yao J	11	19
3	(China) Wang SX	21	21
(Chinese Taipei) Cheng S-c	9	15
(Japan) E Hirose	17	21	21
Q2	(Indonesia) A Firdasari	21	8	19
6	(China) Jiang YJ	21	21
(Thailand) P Buranaprasertsuk	10	10
(Bulgaria) P Nedelcheva	17	8
(Japan) S Sato	21	21

Second round
1	(China) Wang YH	21	21
(China) Liu X	13	12
5	(Denmark) T Baun	21	21
(Japan) A Goto	9	17
3	(China) Wang SX	21	21
(Japan) E Hirose	10	19
6	(China) Jiang JY	21	21
(Japan) S Sato	17	17

Quarterfinals
1	(China) Wang YH	19	25	21
5	(Denmark) T Baun	21	23	9
3	(China) Wang SX	21	21
6	(China) Jiang JY	18	10

Semifinals
1	(China) Wang YH	20	21	21
3	(China) Wang SX	22	18	18

=== Bottom half ===
First round
(Singapore) Gu J	19	9
Q4	(Indonesia) MF Kusumastuti	21	21
(Bulgaria) L Zechiri	21	4	10
7	(China) Li XR	8	21	21
(France) Pi HY	21	21
(Spain) C Marín	16	16
Q3	(Thailand) S Taerattanachai	11	21	13
4	(India) S Nehwal	21	13	21
Q1	(India) P. V. Sindhu	21	16	19
(Chinese Taipei) Tai T-y	14	21	21
(South Korea) Bae Y-j	21	13	14
8	(Germany) J Schenk	18	21	21
(Hong Kong) Yip P Y	15	13
(Thailand) R Inthanon	21	21
(South Korea) Sung J-h	21	21
2	(China) Wang X	8	13

Second round
Q4	(Indonesia) MF Kusumastuti	11	19
7	(China) Li XR	21	21
(France) Pi HY	10	17
4	(India) S Nehwal	21	21
(Chinese Taipei) Tai T-y	21	21
8	(Germany) J Schenk	12	11
(Thailand) R Inthanon	21	22	15
(South Korea) Sung J-h	17	24	21

Quarterfinals
7	(China) Li XR	21	23
4	(India) S Nehwal	13	21
(Chinese Taipei) Tai T-y	20	21	21
(South Korea) Sung J-h	22	14	14

Semifinals
7	(China) Li XR	19	21	21
(Chinese Taipei) Tai T-y	21	16	10

=== Finals ===
Semifinals
1	(China) Wang Yihan	20	21	21
3	(China) Wang Shixian	22	18	18
7	(China) Li Xuerui	19	21	21
(Chinese Taipei) Tai Tzu-ying	21	16	10

Final
1	(China) Wang Yihan	13	19
7	(China) Li Xuerui	21	21

== Men's doubles ==
=== Seeds ===
1. (China) Cai Yun / Fu Haifeng (Final)
2. (South Korea) Jung Jae-sung / Lee Yong-dae (Champions)
3. (Denmark) Mathias Boe / Carsten Mogensen (Semi-finals)
4. (South Korea) Ko Sung-hyun / Yoo Yeon-seong (First round)
5. (China) Chai Biao / Guo Zhendong (Quarter-finals)
6. (Malaysia) Koo Kien Keat / Tan Boon Heong (Second round)
7. (Indonesia) Mohammad Ahsan / Bona Septano (Quarter-finals)
8. (Japan) Hirokatsu Hashimoto / Noriyasu Hirata (Semi-finals)

=== Top half ===
First round
1	(China) Cai Y (China) Fu HF	21	21
(Canada) A Liu (Canada) D Ng	9	15
(Indonesia) A Pratama (Indonesia) R A Saputro	12	21	14
(Japan) H Endo (Japan) K Hayakawa	21	17	21
7	(Indonesia) M Ahsan (Indonesia) B Septano	21	17	21
(United States) H Bach (United States) T Gunawan	19	21	14
(Germany) M Fuchs (Germany) O Roth	19	11
Q2	(Malaysia) M Z A Latif (Malaysia) M F M Tazari	21	21
4	(South Korea) Ko S-h (South Korea) Yoo Y-s	18	16
(Chinese Taipei) Fang C-m (Chinese Taipei) Lee S-m	21	21
Q1	(Thailand) B Issara (Thailand) M Jongjit	14	11
(Denmark) M Conrad-Petersen (Denmark) J Rasmussen	21	21
8	(Japan) H Hashimoto (Japan) N Hirata	21	21
Q4	(Russia) V Durkin (Russia) A Nikolaenko	9	17
(Germany) I Kindervater (Germany) J Schöttler	24	21
(India) KT R Kumar (India) S Thomas	22	17

Second round
1	(China) Cai Y (China) Fu HF	22	21
(Japan) H Endo (Japan) K Hayakawa	20	17
7	(Indonesia) M Ahsan (Indonesia) B Septano	24	21
Q2	(Malaysia) M Z A Latif (Malaysia) M F M Tazari	22	13
(Chinese Taipei) Fang C-m (Chinese Taipei) Lee S-m	21	17	21
(Denmark) M Conrad-Petersen (Denmark) J Rasmussen	15	21	11
8	(Japan) H Hashimoto (Japan) N Hirata	21	13	21
(Germany) I Kindervater (Germany) J Schöttler	13	21	7

Quarterfinals
1	(China) Cai Y (China) Fu HF	21	21
7	(Indonesia) M Ahsan (Indonesia) B Septano	19	8
(Chinese Taipei) Fang C-m (Chinese Taipei) Lee S-m	15	21	12
8	(Japan) H Hashimoto (Japan) N Hirata	21	17	21

Semifinals
1	(China) Cai Y (China) Fu HF	21	21
8	(Japan) H Hashimoto (Japan) N Hirata	10	15

=== Bottom half ===
First round
(Russia) V Ivanov (Russia) I Sozonov	17	13
(China) Liu XL (China) Qiu ZH	21	21
(South Korea) Kim K-j (South Korea) Kim S-r	18	21	24
5	(China) Chai B (China) Guo ZD	21	18	26
(Netherlands) R Bosch (Netherlands) K Ridder	16	15
(Indonesia) M Kido (Indonesia) H Setiawan	21	21
(Chinese Taipei) Chen H-l (Chinese Taipei) Lin Y-l	11	14
3	(Denmark) M Boe (Denmark) C Mogensen	21	21
(China) Hong W (China) Shen Y	21	21
(Poland) A Cwalina (Poland) M Logosz	6	11
(Japan) N Kawamae (Japan) S Sato	11	18
6	(Malaysia) Koo K K (Malaysia) Tan B H	21	21
(England) C Adcock (England) A Ellis	13	21	21
(Indonesia) A Y Chandra (Indonesia) H A Gunawan	21	17	13
Q3	(Malaysia) Goh V S (Malaysia) Teo K S	10	11
2	(South Korea) Jung J-s (South Korea) Lee Y-d	21	21

Second round
(China) Liu XL (China) Qiu ZH	16	19
5	(China) Chai B (China) Guo ZD	21	21
(Indonesia) M Kido (Indonesia) H Setiawan	18	17
3	(Denmark) M Boe (Denmark) C Mogensen	21	21
(China) Hong W (China) Shen Y	12	21	22
6	(Malaysia) Koo K K (Malaysia) Tan B H	21	17	21
(England) C Adcock (England) A Ellis	13	15
2	(South Korea) Jung J-s (South Korea) Lee Y-d	21	21

Quarterfinals
5	(China) Chai B (China) Guo ZD	12	19
3	(Denmark) M Boe (Denmark) C Mogensen	21	21
(China) Hong W (China) Shen Y	15	15
2	(South Korea) Jung J-s (South Korea) Lee Y-d	21	21

Semifinals
3	(Denmark) M Boe (Denmark) C Mogensen	14	13
2	(South Korea) Jung J-s (South Korea) Lee Y-d	21	21

=== Finals ===
Semifinals
1	(China) Cai Yun (China) Fu Haifeng	21	21
8	(Japan) Hirokatsu Hashimoto (Japan) Noriyasu Hirata	10	15
3	(Denmark) Mathias Boe (Denmark) Carsten Mogensen	14	3
2	(South Korea) Jung Jae-sung (South Korea) Lee Yong-dae	21	21

Final
1	(China) Cai Yun (China) Fu Haifeng	23	9	14
2	(South Korea) Jung Jae-sung (South Korea) Lee Yong-dae	21	21	21

== Women's doubles ==
=== Seeds ===
1. (China) Wang Xiaoli / Yu Yang (Finals)
2. (China) Tian Qing / Zhao Yunlei (Winner)
3. (South Korea) Ha Jung-eun / Kim Min-jung (Semi-finals)
4. (Japan) Mizuki Fujii / Reika Kakiiwa (First round)
5. (Japan) Miyuki Maeda / Satoko Suetsuna (Second round)
6. (Japan) Shizuka Matsuo / Mami Naito (Second round)
7. (Denmark) Christinna Pedersen / Kamilla Rytter Juhl (Quarter-finals)
8. (Chinese Taipei) Cheng Wen-hsing / Chien Yu-chin (Second round)

=== Top half ===
First round
1	(China) Wang XL (China) Yu Y	21	21
Q1	(England) J Wallwork (England) G White	16	10
(Netherlands) L Jonathans (Netherlands) P van Dooremalen	11	10
(Indonesia) M Jauhari (Indonesia) G Polii	21	21
5	(Japan) M Maeda (Japan) S Suetsuna	22	21
(Denmark) L Damkæjr Kruse (Denmark) M Rœpke	20	11
(Russia) V Sorokina (Russia) N Vislova	11	6
(South Korea) Eom H-w (South Korea) Jang Y-n	21	21
4	(Japan) M Fujii (Japan) R Kakiiwa	17	21	20
(China) Ma J (China) Zhong QX	21	19	22
(Japan) M Matsutomo (Japan) A Takahashi	19	23	21
Q4	(Malaysia) Ng H E (Malaysia) Ng H L	21	21	15
8	(Chinese Taipei) Cheng W-h (Chinese Taipei) Chien Y-c	21	21	21
Q2	(Chinese Taipei) Hsieh P-c (Chinese Taipei) Wang P-r	23	14	11
(China) Huan X (China) Tang JH	21	9	21
(Thailand) D Aroonkesorn (Thailand) K Voravichitchaikul	18	21	16

Second round
1	(China) Wang XL (China) Yu Y	21	21
(Indonesia) M Jauhari (Indonesia) G Polii	16	12
5	(Japan) M Maeda (Japan) S Suetsuna	20	18
(South Korea) Eom H-w (South Korea) Jang Y-n	22	21
(China) Ma J (China) Zhong QX	21	16	21
(Japan) M Matsutomo (Japan) A Takahashi	18	21	17
8	(Chinese Taipei) Cheng W-h (Chinese Taipei) Chien Y-c	17	18
(China) Huan X (China) Tang JH	21	21

Quarterfinals
1	(China) Wang XL (China) Yu Y	21	21
(South Korea) Eom H-w (South Korea) Jang Y-n	14	16
(China) Ma J (China) Zhong QX	12	4
(China) Huan X (China) Tang JH	21	21

Semifinals
1	(China) Wang XL (China) Yu Y	21	21
(China) Huan X (China) Tang JH	13	18

=== Bottom half ===
First round
(Hong Kong) Poon L Y (Hong Kong) Tse Y S	16	21	21
(Malaysia) Hoo V K M (Malaysia) Woon K W	21	19	18
(England) M Agathangelou (England) H Olver	10	10
6	(Japan) S Matsuo (Japan) M Naito	21	21
(Germany) S Marinello (Germany) B Michels	21	21
(Indonesia) V Marissa (Indonesia) N Melati	17	13
(Singapore) S M Sari (Singapore) Lei Y	21	19	16
3	(South Korea) Ha J-e (South Korea) Kim M-j	17	21	21
(South Korea) Jung K-e (South Korea) Kim H-n	21	21
(China) Cheng S (China) Pan P	15	14
Q3	(Malaysia) Goh L Y (Malaysia) Lim Y L	16	16
7	(Denmark) C Pedersen (Denmark) K Rytter Juhl	21	21
(India) J Gutta (India) A Ponnappa	21	21
(Indonesia) A F Agustin (Indonesia) N K Maheswari	16	16
(Malaysia) Chin E H (Malaysia) Wong P T	17	14
2	(China) Tian Q (China) Zhao YL	21	21

Second round
(Hong Kong) Poon L Y (Hong Kong) Tse Y S	22	22
6	(Japan) S Matsuo (Japan) M Naito	20	20
(Germany) S Marinello (Germany) B Michels	13	7^{r}
3	(South Korea) Ha J-e (South Korea) Kim M-j	21	13
(South Korea) Jung K-e (South Korea) Kim H-n	13	10
7	(Denmark) C Pedersen (Denmark) K Rytter Juhl	21	21
(India) J Gutta (India) A Ponnappa	10	15
2	(China) Tian Q (China) Zhao YL	21	21

Quarterfinals
(Hong Kong) Poon L Y (Hong Kong) Tse Y S	16	21
3	(South Korea) Ha J-e (South Korea) Kim M-j	21	23
7	(Denmark) C Pedersen (Denmark) K Rytter Juhl	17	13
2	(China) Tian Q (China) Zhao YL	21	21

Semifinals
3	(South Korea) Ha J-e (South Korea) Kim M-j	19	19
2	(China) Tian Q (China) Zhao YL	21	21

=== Finals ===
Semifinals
1	(China) Wang Xiaoli (China) Yu Yang	21	21
(China) Huan Xia (China) Tang Jinhua	13	18
3	(South Korea) Ha Jung-eun (South Korea) Kim Min-jung	19	19
2	(China) Tian Qing (China) Zhao Yunlei	21	21

Final
1	(China) Wang Xiaoli (China) Yu Yang	17	12
2	(China) Tian Qing (China) Zhao Yunlei	21	21

== Mixed doubles ==
=== Seeds ===
1. (China) Zhang Nan / Zhao Yunlei (First round)
2. (China) Xu Chen / Ma Jin (Semi-finals)
3. (Denmark) Joachim Fischer Nielsen / Christinna Pedersen (Quarter-finals)
4. (Indonesia) Tantowi Ahmad / Lilyana Natsir (Winner)
5. (Chinese Taipei) Chen Hung-ling / Cheng Wen-hsing (Second round)
6. (Thailand) Sudket Prapakamol / Saralee Thoungthongkam (First round)
7. (South Korea) Lee Yong-dae / Ha Jung-eun (First round)
8. (Denmark) Thomas Laybourn / Kamilla Rytter Juhl (Finals)

=== Top half ===
First round
1	(China) Zhang N (China) Zhao YL	21	19	19
(England) C Adcock (Scotland) I Bankier	16	21	21
(Singapore) D B Chrisnanta (Singapore) Y Y V Neo	21	17
(South Korea) Yoo Y-s (South Korea) Jang Y-n	23	21
7	(South Korea) Lee Y-d (South Korea) Ha J-e	20	16
(Japan) S Sato (Japan) S Matsuo	22	21
(Malaysia) Chan P S (Malaysia) Goh L Y	21	21
(India) Diju V. (India) J Gutta	14	12
4	(Indonesia) T Ahmad (Indonesia) L Natsir	18	21	21
Q1	(Malaysia) Ong J G (Malaysia) Lim Y L	21	8	19
(Germany) M Fuchs (Germany) B Michels	21	19	12
(China) He HB (China) Bao YX	14	21	21
5	(Chinese Taipei) Chen H-l (Chinese Taipei) Cheng W-h	2
(Poland) R Mateusiak (Poland) N Zieba	0^{r}
(Thailand) S Anugritayawon (Thailand) K Voravichitchaikul	18	18
(England) N Robertson (England) J Wallwork	21	21

Second round
(England) C Adcock (Scotland) I Bankier	15	21	21
(South Korea) Yoo Y-s (South Korea) Jang Y-n	21	19	19
(Japan) S Sato (Japan) S Matsuo	18	9
(Malaysia) Chan P S (Malaysia) Goh L Y	21	21
4	(Indonesia) T Ahmad (Indonesia) L Natsir	21	21
(China) He HB (China) Bao YX	11	18
5	(Chinese Taipei) Chen H-l (Chinese Taipei) Cheng W-h	13	13
(England) N Robertson (England) J Wallwork	21	21

Quarterfinals
(England) C Adcock (Scotland) I Bankier	16	21	17
(Malaysia) Chan P S (Malaysia) Goh L Y	21	15	21
4	(Indonesia) T Ahmad (Indonesia) L Natsir	21	14	21
(England) N Robertson (England) J Wallwork	19	21	6

Semifinals
(Malaysia) Chan P S (Malaysia) Goh L Y	25	16
4	(Indonesia) T Ahmad (Indonesia) L Natsir	27	21

=== Bottom half ===
First round
(Indonesia) M Rijal (Indonesia) D Susanto	21	21
Q4	(Scotland) R Blair (Scotland) J Cooper	15	17
Q2	(Japan) N Hirata (Japan) M Maeda	11	16
8	(Denmark) T Laybourn (Denmark) K Rytter Juhl	21	21
Q3	(Indonesia) H Setiawan (Indonesia) V Marissa	21	14	21
(Canada) T Ng (Canada) G Gao	15	21	13
(China) Tao JM (China) Xia H	19	16
3	(Denmark) J Fischer Nielsen (Denmark) C Pedersen	21	21
(Thailand) M Jongjit (Thailand) S Amitapai	13	9
(Russia) A Nikolaenko (Russia) V Sorokina	21	21
(South Korea) Ko S-h (South Korea) Eom H-w	21	21
6	(Thailand) S Prapakamol (Thailand) S Thoungthongkam	16	16
PFQ	(Singapore) C Triyachart (Singapore) Yao L	17	21	21
(Japan) S Ikeda (Japan) R Shiota	21	15	16
(South Korea) Kim K-j (South Korea) Jung K-e	13	4
2	(China) Xu C (China) Ma J	21	21

Second round
(Indonesia) M Rijal (Indonesia) D Susanto	18	17
8	(Denmark) T Laybourn (Denmark) K Rytter Juhl	21	21
Q3	(Indonesia) H Setiawan (Indonesia) V Marissa	7	9
3	(Denmark) J Fischer Nielsen (Denmark) C Pedersen	21	21
(Russia) A Nikolaenko (Russia) V Sorokina	16	21	21
(South Korea) Ko S-h (South Korea) Eom H-w	21	15	13
PFQ	(Singapore) C Triyachart (Singapore) Y Lei	22	15	11
2	(China) Xu C (China) Ma J	20	21	21

Quarterfinals
8	(Denmark) T Laybourn (Denmark) K Rytter Juhl	21	21
3	(Denmark) J Fischer Nielsen (Denmark) C Pedersen	15	16
(Russia) A Nikolaenko (Russia) V Sorokina	18	19
2	(China) Xu C (China) Ma J	21	21

Semifinals
8	(Denmark) T Laybourn (Denmark) K Rytter Juhl	21	21
2	(China) Xu C (China) Ma J	16	18

=== Finals ===
Semifinals
(Malaysia) Chan Peng Soon (Malaysia) Goh Liu Ying	25	16
4	(Indonesia) Tantowi Ahmad (Indonesia) Lilyana Natsir	27	21
8	(Denmark) Thomas Laybourn (Denmark) Kamilla Rytter Juhl	21	21
2	(China) Xu Chen (China) Ma Jin	16	18

Final
4	(Indonesia) Tantowi Ahmad (Indonesia) Lilyana Natsir	21	21
8	(Denmark) Thomas Laybourn (Denmark) Kamilla Rytter Juhl	17	19

Preceded by 2012 Malaysia Super Series	BWF Super Series; 2012 season	Succeeded by 2012 India Super Series
