= 2012 Malaysia Super Series =

Tournament details
- Dates: 10–15 January 2012
- Edition: 57th
- Total prize money: US$400,000
- Location: Kuala Lumpur, Malaysia

Champions
- Men's singles: (Malaysia) Lee Chong Wei
- Women's singles: (China) Wang Yihan
- Men's doubles: (Chinese Taipei) Fang Chieh-min (Chinese Taipei) Lee Sheng-mu
- Women's doubles: (Denmark) Christinna Pedersen (Denmark) Kamilla Rytter Juhl
- Mixed doubles: (China) Zhang Nan (China) Zhao Yunlei

The Malaysia Super Series was the second Super Series tournament of the 2012 BWF Super Series. The tournament was held in Kuala Lumpur, Malaysia from 10 to 15 January 2012 and had a total purse of $400,000.

== Men's singles ==
=== Seeds ===
1. (Malaysia) Lee Chong Wei (champion)
2. (China) Lin Dan (second round)
3. (China) Chen Long (semi-finals)
4. (Denmark) Peter Gade (second round)
5. (China) Chen Jin (semi-finals)
6. (Japan) Sho Sasaki (quarter-finals)
7. (Indonesia) Simon Santoso (quarter-finals)
8. (Vietnam) Nguyễn Tiến Minh (second round)

=== Top half ===
First Round
1 | (Malaysia) Lee C W | 21 | 21
Q4 | (Malaysia) D Liew | 8 | 11
(Poland) P Wacha | 9 | 13
(Japan) K Yamada | 21 | 21
8 | (Vietnam) Nguyễn T M | 18 | 21 | 21
(China) Wang ZM | 21 | 15 | 15
(Indonesia) T Hidayat | 21 | 21
Q1 | (Chinese Taipei) Chou T-c | 14 | 9
3 | (China) Chen L | 21 | 21
(England) R Ouseph | 12 | 14
(Denmark) H-K Vittinghus | 17 | 21 | 21
(South Korea) Lee H-i | 21 | 12 | 13
6 | (Japan) S Sasaki | 12 | 21 | 21
(Germany) M Zwiebler | 21 | 12 | 14
Q2 | (Malaysia) Wong C H | 22 | 18
(Spain) P Abián | 24 | 21

Second Round
1 | (Malaysia) Lee C W | 21 | 21
(Japan) K Yamada | 8 | 18
8 | (Vietnam) Nguyễn T M | 11 | 14
(Indonesia) T Hidayat | 21 | 21
3 | (China) Chen L | 21 | 21
(Denmark) H-K Vittinghus | 15 | 17
6 | (Japan) S Sasaki | 21 | 21
(Spain) P Abián | 14 | 17

Quarterfinals
1 | (Malaysia) Lee C W | 21 | 21
(Indonesia) T Hidayat | 9 | 18
3 | (China) Chen L | 21 | 21
6 | (Japan) S Sasaki | 19 | 17

Semifinals
1 | (Malaysia) Lee C W | 21 | 17 | 21
3 | (China) Chen L | 18 | 21 | 13

=== Bottom half ===
First Round
(South Korea) Son W-h | 14 | 16
(Indonesia) T Sugiarto | 21 | 21
(India) A Jayaram | 21 | 18 | 16
7 | (Indonesia) S Santoso | 9 | 21 | 21
(Japan) K Tago | 21 | 11
(Thailand) B Ponsana | 11 | 6^{r}
(Hong Kong) Wong W K | 19 | 18
4 | (Denmark) P Gade | 21 | 21
(Indonesia) D H Rumbaka | 17 | 21 | 21
PFQ | (Malaysia) M H Hashim | 21 | 13 | 11
(Hong Kong) Hu Y | 16 | 27
5 | (China) Chen J | 21 | 29
(Denmark) J Ø Jørgensen | 12 | 21 | 26
(China) Du PY | 21 | 11 | 24
Q3 | (Denmark) V Axelsen | 14 | 13
2 | (China) Lin D | 21 | 21

Second Round
(Indonesia) T Sugiarto | 18 | 15
7 | (Indonesia) S Santoso | 21 | 21
(Japan) K Tago | 19 | 21 | 21
4 | (Denmark) P Gade | 21 | 11 | 16
(Indonesia) D H Rumbaka | 11^{r}
5 | (China) Chen J | 21
(Denmark) J Ø Jørgensen | 14 | 21 | 21
2 | (China) Lin D | 21 | 15 | 15

Quarterfinals
7 | (Indonesia) S Santoso | 15 | 9
(Japan) K Tago | 21 | 21
5 | (China) Chen J | 21 | 20 | 21
(Denmark) J Ø Jørgensen | 16 | 22 | 6

Semifinals
(Japan) K Tago | 3
5 | (China) Chen J | 2^{r}

=== Finals ===
Semifinals
1 | (Malaysia) Lee Chong Wei | 21 | 17 | 21
3 | (China) Chen Long | 18 | 21 | 13
(Japan) Kenichi Tago | 3
5 | (China) Chen Jin | 2^{r}

Final
1 | (Malaysia) Lee Chong Wei | 21 | 21
(Japan) Kenichi Tago | 6 | 13

== Women's singles ==
=== Seeds ===
1. (China) Wang Yihan (champion)
2. (China) Wang Xin (final)
3. (China) Wang Shixian (semi-finals)
4. (India) Saina Nehwal (semi-finals)
5. (Denmark) Tine Baun (quarter-finals)
6. (China) Jiang Yanjiao (quarter-finals)
7. (South Korea) Sung Ji-hyun (second round)
8. (Germany) Juliane Schenk (quarter-finals)

=== Top half ===
First Round
1 | (China) Wang YH | 21 | 21
Q4 | (Indonesia) A Firdasari | 13 | 15
(South Korea) Bae Y-j | 21 | 21
Q2 | (Indonesia) M F Kusumastuti | 16 | 10
7 | (South Korea) Sung J-h | 21 | 18 | 21
(Germany) O Konon | 17 | 21 | 12
(Thailand) R Intanon | 18 | 19
(China) Li XR | 21 | 21
4 | (India) S Nehwal | 19 | 21 | 21
(Singapore) Gu J | 21 | 14 | 15
(Chinese Taipei) Cheng S-c | 21 | 21
Q3 | (Hong Kong) Chan T K | 19 | 16
5 | (Denmark) T Baun | 21
(Netherlands) Yao J | 10^{r}
(China) Liu X | 21 | 21
(Bulgaria) P Nedelcheva | 9 | 18

Second Round
1 | (China) Wang YH | 21 | 21
(South Korea) Bae Y-j | 12 | 8
7 | (South Korea) Sung J-h | 13 | 15
(China) Li XR | 21 | 21
4 | (India) S Nehwal | 21 | 21
(Chinese Taipei) Cheng S-c | 19 | 8
5 | (Denmark) T Baun | 21 | 21
(China) Liu X | 16 | 15

Quarterfinals
1 | (China) Wang YH | 21 | 21
(China) Li XR | 13 | 15
4 | (India) S Nehwal | 21 | 21 | 21
5 | (Denmark) T Baun | 13 | 23 | 13

Semifinals
1 | (China) Wang YH | 21 | 21
4 | (India) S Nehwal | 15 | 16

=== Bottom half ===
First Round
Q1 | (Malaysia) Tee J Y | 16 | 25 | 21
(Thailand) P Buranaprasertsuk | 21 | 23 | 10
(Bulgaria) L Zetchiri | 12 | 9
8 | (Germany) J Schenk | 21 | 21
(Spain) C Marín | 15 | 21 | 11
(Chinese Taipei) Pai H-m | 21 | 17 | 21
(Canada) M Li | 15 | 14
3 | (China) Wang SX | 21 | 21
(France) Pi HY | 21 | 21
(Japan) S Sato | 13 | 13
(Singapore) Fu MT | 12 | 15
6 | (China) Jiang YJ | 21 | 21
(Chinese Taipei) Tai T-y | 16 | 17
(Japan) E Hirose | 21 | 21
(Hong Kong) Yip P Y | 17 | 10
2 | (China) Wang X | 21 | 21

Second Round
Q1 | (Malaysia) Tee J Y | 18 | 6
8 | (Germany) J Schenk | 21 | 21
(Chinese Taipei) Pai H-m | 22 | 11
3 | (China) Wang SX | 24 | 21
(France) Pi HY | 16 | 8
6 | (China) Jiang YJ | 21 | 21
(Japan) E Hirose | 21 | 22 | 16
2 | (China) Wang X | 23 | 20 | 21

Quarterfinals
8 | (Germany) J Schenk | 15 | 19
3 | (China) Wang SX | 21 | 21
6 | (China) Jiang YJ | 15 | 19
2 | (China) Wang X | 21 | 21

Semifinals
3 | (China) Wang SX | 12 | 23
2 | (China) Wang X | 21 | 25

=== Finals ===
Semifinals
1 | (China) Wang Yihan | 21 | 21
4 | (India) Saina Nehwal | 15 | 16
3 | (China) Wang Shixian | 12 | 23
2 | (China) Wang Xin | 21 | 25

Final
1 | (China) Wang Yihan | 21 | 21
2 | (China) Wang Xin | 19 | 11

== Men's doubles ==
=== Seeds ===
1. (South Korea) Jung Jae-sung / Lee Yong-dae (withdrew)
2. (South Korea) Ko Sung-hyun / Yoo Yeon-seong (first round)
3. (China) Chai Biao / Guo Zhendong (semi-finals)
4. (Malaysia) Koo Kien Keat / Tan Boon Heong (second round)
5. (Indonesia) Mohammad Ahsan / Bona Septano (second round)
6. (Japan) Hirokatsu Hashimoto / Noriyasu Hirata (semi-finals)
7. (Indonesia) Alvent Yulianto Chandra / Hendra Aprida Gunawan (second round)
8. (Indonesia) Markis Kido / Hendra Setiawan (quarter-finals)

=== Top half ===
First Round
PFQ | (Austria) J Koch (Austria) P Zauner | 13 | 16
(United States) H Bach (United States) T Gunawan | 21 | 21
(South Korea) Cho G-w (South Korea) Shin B-c | 21 | 21
(Poland) A Cwalina (Poland) M Łogosz | 11 | 16
7 | (Indonesia) H A Gunawan (Indonesia) A Yulianto | 21 | 21
(Denmark) M Conrad-Petersen (Denmark) J Rasmussen | 15 | 14
(Germany) I Kindervater (Germany) J Schöttler | 14 | 21 | 10
(Japan) N Kawamae (Japan) S Sato | 21 | 19 | 21
3 | (China) Chai B (China) Guo ZD | 12 | 21 | 21
(England) C Adcock (England) A Ellis | 21 | 13 | 13
(Russia) V Durkin (Russia) A Nikolaenko | 14 | 17
(Indonesia) A Pratama (Indonesia) R A Saputro | 21 | 21
8 | (Indonesia) M Kido (Indonesia) H Setiawan | 21 | 21
Q1 | (Malaysia) M Z Abdul Latif (Malaysia) M F Mohd Tazari | 19 | 12
Q4 | (Malaysia) Mak H C (Malaysia) Ong S H | 14 | 21 | 21
(Netherlands) R Bosch (Netherlands) K Ridder | 21 | 12 | 16

Second Round
(United States) H Bach (United States) T Gunawan | 13 | 16
(South Korea) Cho G-w (South Korea) Shin B-c | 21 | 21
7 | (Indonesia) H A Gunawan (Indonesia) A Yulianto | 21 | 18 | 15
(Japan) N Kawamae (Japan) S Sato | 9 | 21 | 21
3 | (China) Chai B (China) Guo ZD | 21 | 19 | 21
(Indonesia) A Pratama (Indonesia) R A Saputro | 16 | 21 | 13
8 | (Indonesia) M Kido (Indonesia) H Setiawan | 21 | 21
Q4 | (Malaysia) Mak H C (Malaysia) Ong S H | 16 | 13

Quarterfinals
(South Korea) Cho G-w (South Korea) Shin B-c | 17 | 21 | 21
(Japan) N Kawamae (Japan) S Sato | 21 | 9 | 14
3 | (China) Chai B (China) Guo ZD | 21 | 18 | 21
8 | (Indonesia) M Kido (Indonesia) H Setiawan | 16 | 21 | 17

Semifinals
(South Korea) Cho G-w (South Korea) Shin B-c | 26 | 23
3 | (China) Chai B (China) Guo ZD | 24 | 21

=== Bottom half ===
First Round
(Malaysia) Gan T C (Malaysia) Tan B S | 19 | 13
(Germany) M Fuchs (Germany) O Roth | 21 | 21
(Chinese Taipei) Chen H-l (Chinese Taipei) Lin Y-l | 16 | 8
6 | (Japan) H Hashimoto (Japan) N Hirata | 21 | 21
Q3 | (Malaysia) Ong J G (Malaysia) Teo K S | 21 | 13 | 10
(South Korea) Kim K-j (South Korea) Kim S-r | 19 | 21 | 21
(India) R Kumar K.T. (India) S Thomas | 14 | 13
4 | (Malaysia) Koo K K (Malaysia) Tan B H | 21 | 21
(China) Liu XL (China) Qiu ZH | 12 | 18
(Chinese Taipei) Fang C-m (Chinese Taipei) Lee S-m | 21 | 21
Q2 | (Chinese Taipei) Liao M-c (Chinese Taipei) Wu C-w | 16 | 18
5 | (Indonesia) M Ahsan (Indonesia) B Septano | 21 | 21
(Malaysia) Goh W S (Malaysia) Lim K W | 7 | 21 | 19
(China) Hong W (China) Shen Y | 21 | 17 | 21
(Japan) H Endo (Japan) K Hayakawa | 19 | 21 | 21
2 | (South Korea) Ko S-h (South Korea) Yoo Y-s | 21 | 18 | 19

Second Round
(Germany) M Fuchs (Germany) O Roth | 15 | 15
6 | (Japan) H Hashimoto (Japan) N Hirata | 21 | 21
(South Korea) Kim K-j (South Korea) Kim S-r | 21 | 18 | 21
4 | (Malaysia) Koo K K (Malaysia) Tan B H | 16 | 21 | 16
(Chinese Taipei) Fang C-m (Chinese Taipei) Lee S-m | 15 | 21 | 21
5 | (Indonesia) M Ahsan (Indonesia) B Septano | 21 | 11 | 16
(China) Hong W (China) Shen Y | 21 | 21
(Japan) H Endo (Japan) K Hayakawa | 8 | 16

Quarterfinals
6 | (Japan) H Hashimoto (Japan) N Hirata | 15 | 24 | 21
(South Korea) Kim K-j (South Korea) Kim S-r | 21 | 22 | 19
(Chinese Taipei) Fang C-m (Chinese Taipei) Lee S-m | 23 | 21
(China) Hong W (China) Shen Y | 21 | 14

Semifinals
6 | (Japan) H Hashimoto (Japan) N Hirata | 19 | 21 | 12
(Chinese Taipei) Fang C-m (Chinese Taipei) Lee S-m | 21 | 18 | 21

=== Finals ===
Semifinals
(South Korea) Cho Gun-woo (South Korea) Shin Baek-cheol | 26 | 23
3 | (China) Chai Biao (China) Guo Zhendong | 24 | 21
6 | (Japan) Hirokatsu Hashimoto (Japan) Noriyasu Hirata | 19 | 21 | 12
(Chinese Taipei) Fang Chieh-min (Chinese Taipei) Lee Sheng-mu | 21 | 18 | 21

Final
(South Korea) Cho Gun-woo (South Korea) Shin Baek-cheol | 21 | 16 | 16
(Chinese Taipei) Fang Chieh-min (Chinese Taipei) Lee Sheng-mu | 16 | 21 | 21

== Women's doubles ==
=== Seeds ===
1. (Japan) Mizuki Fujii / Reika Kakiiwa (quarter-finals)
2. (South Korea) Ha Jung-eun / Kim Min-jung (final)
3. (Japan) Miyuki Maeda / Satoko Suetsuna (first round)
4. (Japan) Shizuka Matsuo / Mami Naito (semi-finals)
5. (Chinese Taipei) Cheng Wen-hsing / Chien Yu-chin (quarter-finals)
6. (Indonesia) Meiliana Jauhari / Greysia Polii (first round)
7. (Denmark) Christinna Pedersen / Kamilla Rytter Juhl (champions)
8. (Hong Kong) Poon Lok Yan / Tse Ying Suet (first round)

=== Top half ===
First Round
1 | (Japan) M Fujii (Japan) R Kakiiwa | 21 | 19 | 21
(China) Xia H (China) Tang JH | 18 | 21 | 17
(Australia) L Choo (Australia) R Veeran | 7 | 17
(Singapore) S M Sari (Singapore) Lei Y | 21 | 21
7 | (Denmark) C Pedersen (Denmark) K Rytter Juhl | 21 | 15 | 21
(India) J Gutta (India) A Ponnappa | 13 | 21 | 17
Q2 | (Malaysia) Chow M K (Malaysia) Lee M Y | 18 | 13
(Russia) V Sorokina (Russia) N Vislova | 21 | 21
3 | (Japan) M Maeda (Japan) S Suetsuna | 21 | 19 | 17
(Malaysia) V Hoo (Malaysia) Woon K W | 15 | 21 | 21
Q1 | (South Korea) Lee S-h (South Korea) Shin S-c | 22 | 18
(Indonesia) A F Agustin (Indonesia) N K Maheswari | 24 | 21
8 | (Hong Kong) Poon L Y (Hong Kong) Tse Y S | 8 | 20
(China) Yao YX (China) Zhong QX | 21 | 22
(South Korea) Jung K-e (South Korea) Kim H-n | 16 | 21 | 21
Q4 | (Malaysia) Goh L Y (Malaysia) Lim Y L | 21 | 8 | 9

Second Round
1 | (Japan) M Fujii (Japan) R Kakiiwa | 22 | 9 | 21
(Singapore) S M Sari (Singapore) Yao L | 20 | 21 | 10
7 | (Denmark) C Pedersen (Denmark) K Rytter Juhl | 21 | 21
(Russia) V Sorokina (Russia) N Vislova | 6 | 10
(Malaysia) V Hoo (Malaysia) Woon K W | w | / | o
(Indonesia) A F Agustin (Indonesia) N K Maheswari
(China) Bao YX (China) Zhong QX | 21 | 21
(South Korea) Jung K-e (South Korea) Kim H-n | 18 | 12

Quarterfinals
1 | (Japan) M Fujii (Japan) R Kakiiwa | 19 | 9
7 | (Denmark) C Pedersen (Denmark) K Rytter Juhl | 21 | 21
(Malaysia) V Hoo (Malaysia) Woon K W | 14 | 4^{r}
(China) Bao YX (China) Zhong QX | 21 | 9

Semifinals
7 | (Denmark) C Pedersen (Denmark) K Rytter Juhl | 21 | 21
(China) Bao YX (China) Zhong QX | 14 | 13

=== Bottom half ===
First Round
(United States) I Wang (United States) R Wang | 11 | 13
(Canada) A Bruce (Canada) M Li | 21 | 21
(Indonesia) V Marissa (Indonesia) N Melati | 21 | 17 | 13
5 | (Chinese Taipei) Cheng W-h (Chinese Taipei) Chien Y-c | 17 | 21 | 21
Q3 | (China) Cheng S (China) Pan P | 21 | 21
(Canada) N Grether (Canada) C Reid | 10 | 11
(Denmark) L Damkæjr Kruse (Denmark) M Rœpke | 9 | 21 | 15
4 | (Japan) S Matsuo (Japan) M Naito | 21 | 19 | 21
(Malaysia) Chin E H (Malaysia) Wong P T | 22 | 21
(Sweden) E Lennartsson (Sweden) E Wenberg | 20 | 14
(South Korea) Eom H-w (South Korea) Jang Y-n | 21 | 21
6 | (Indonesia) M Jauhari (Indonesia) G Polii | 11 | 8
(Thailand) D Aroonkesorn (Thailand) K Voravichitchaikul | 20 | 21 | 14
(Germany) S Marinello (Germany) B Michels | 22 | 19 | 21
PFQ | (England) J Wallwork (England) G White | 9 | 18
2 | (South Korea) Ha J-e (South Korea) Kim M-j | 21 | 21

Second Round
(Canada) A Bruce (Canada) M Li | 15 | 13
5 | (Chinese Taipei) Cheng W-h (Chinese Taipei) Chien Y-c | 21 | 21
Q3 | (China) Cheng S (China) Pan P | 18 | 14
4 | (Japan) S Matsuo (Japan) M Naito | 21 | 21
(Malaysia) Chin E H (Malaysia) Wong P T | 21 | 21
(South Korea) Eom H-w (South Korea) Jang Y-n | 18 | 14
(Germany) S Marinello (Germany) B Michels | 15 | 22 | 18
2 | (South Korea) Ha J-e (South Korea) Kim M-j | 21 | 20 | 21

Quarterfinals
5 | (Chinese Taipei) Cheng W-h (Chinese Taipei) Chien Y-c | 21 | 12 | 19
4 | (Japan) S Matsuo (Japan) M Naito | 17 | 21 | 21
(Malaysia) Chin E H (Malaysia) Wong P T | 19 | 10
2 | (South Korea) Ha J-e (South Korea) Kim M-j | 21 | 21

Semifinals
4 | (Japan) S Matsuo (Japan) M Naito | 21 | 15 | 12
2 | (South Korea) Ha J-e (South Korea) Kim M-j | 17 | 21 | 21

=== Finals ===
Semifinals
7 | (Denmark) Christinna Pedersen (Denmark) Kamilla Rytter Juhl | 21 | 21
(China) Bao Yixin (China) Zhong Qianxin | 14 | 13
4 | (Japan) Shizuka Matsuo (Japan) Mami Naito | 21 | 15 | 12
2 | (South Korea) Ha Jung-eun (South Korea) Kim Min-jung | 17 | 21 | 21

Final
7 | (Denmark) Christinna Pedersen (Denmark) Kamilla Rytter Juhl | 21 | 21
2 | (South Korea) Ha Jung-eun (South Korea) Kim Min-jung | 19 | 18

== Mixed doubles ==
=== Seeds ===
1. (China) Zhang Nan / Zhao Yunlei (champions)
2. (China) Xu Chen / Ma Jin (final)
3. (Denmark) Joachim Fischer Nielsen / Christinna Pedersen (withdrew)
4. (Indonesia) Tontowi Ahmad / Liliyana Natsir (semi-finals)
5. (Chinese Taipei) Chen Hung-ling / Cheng Wen-hsing (first round)
6. (Thailand) Sudket Prapakamol / Saralee Thungthongkam (first round)
7. (Thailand) Songphon Anugritayawon / Kunchala Voravichitchaikul (first round)
8. (Japan) Shintaro Ikeda / Reiko Shiota (first round)

=== Top half ===
First Round
1 | (China) Zhang N (China) Zhao YL | 21 | 21
(Chinese Taipei) Lee S-m (Chinese Taipei) Chien Y-c | 19 | 14
(Indonesia) M Rijal (Indonesia) D Susanto | 21 | 21
(Germany) M Fuchs (Germany) B Michels | 16 | 16
6 | (Thailand) S Prapakamol (Thailand) S Thungthongkam | 18 | 19
(Russia) A Nikolaenko (Russia) V Sorokina | 21 | 21
(Indonesia) N Widianto (Indonesia) V Marissa | 17 | 15
(Denmark) T Laybourn (Denmark) K Rytter Juhl | 21 | 21
PFQ | (China) Hong W (China) Pan P | 21 | 18 | 16
(Singapore) D B Chrisnanta (Singapore) V Neo | 12 | 21 | 21
(England) N Robertson (England) J Wallwork | 14 | 21 | 21
(England) C Adcock (Scotland) I Bankier | 21 | 17 | 8
5 | (Chinese Taipei) Chen H-l (Chinese Taipei) Cheng W-h | 17 | 21 | 22
(Malaysia) Chan P S (Malaysia) Goh L Y | 21 | 12 | 24
(India) V Diju (India) J Gutta | 21 | 19 | 21
(Singapore) C Triyachart (Singapore) Yao L | 13 | 21 | 16

Second Round
1 | (China) Zhang N (China) Zhao YL | 21 | 21
(Indonesia) M Rijal (Indonesia) D Susanto | 16 | 14
(Russia) A Nikolaenko (Russia) V Sorokina | 22 | 21
(Denmark) T Laybourn (Denmark) K Rytter Juhl | 20 | 19
(Singapore) D B Chrisnanta (Singapore) V Neo | 21 | 21
(England) N Robertson (England) J Wallwork | 13 | 17
(Malaysia) Chan P S (Malaysia) Goh L Y | 21 | 21 | 21
(India) V Diju (India) J Gutta | 19 | 23 | 19

Quarterfinals
1 | (China) Zhang N (China) Zhao YL | 21 | 21
(Russia) A Nikolaenko (Russia) V Sorokina | 17 | 19
(Singapore) D B Chrisnanta (Singapore) V Neo | 13 | 21 | 25
(Malaysia) Chan P S (Malaysia) Goh L Y | 21 | 14 | 27

Semifinals
1 | (China) Zhang N (China) Zhao YL | 21 | 21
(Malaysia) Chan P S (Malaysia) Goh L Y | 13 | 16

=== Bottom half ===
First Round
(Poland) R Mateusiak (Poland) N Zięba | 21 | 19 | 21
(South Korea) Kim K-j (South Korea) Jung K-e | 12 | 21 | 17
(Thailand) M Jongjit (Thailand) S Amitrapai | 21 | 22 | 21
8 | (Japan) S Ikeda (Japan) R Shiota | 18 | 24 | 19
(Japan) S Sato (Japan) S Matsuo | 18 | 11
Q4 | (Russia) V Durkin (Russia) N Vislova | 21 | 21
(Scotland) R Blair (England) G White | 13 | 17
4 | (Indonesia) T Ahmad (Indonesia) L Natsir | 21 | 21
Q2 | (Malaysia) Tan A Q (Malaysia) Lai P J | 17 | 16
Q1 | (China) Tao JM (China) Xia H | 21 | 21
(South Korea) Lee Y-d (South Korea) Ha J-e | 19 | 21 | 21
7 | (Thailand) S Anugritayawon (Thailand) K Voravichitchaikul | 21 | 19 | 15
(Canada) T Ng (Canada) G Gao | 8 | 19
(China) He HB (China) Bao YX | 21 | 21
Q3 | (South Korea) Yoo Y-s (South Korea) Jang Y-n | 17 | 11
2 | (China) Xu C (China) Ma J | 21 | 21

Second Round
(Poland) R Mateusiak (Poland) N Zięba | 21 | 16 | 22
(Thailand) M Jongjit (Thailand) S Amitrapai | 13 | 21 | 21
Q4 | (Russia) V Durkin (Russia) N Vislova | 11 | 20
4 | (Indonesia) T Ahmad (Indonesia) L Natsir | 21 | 22
Q1 | (China) Tao JM (China) Xia H | 12 | 14
(South Korea) Lee Y-d (South Korea) Ha J-e | 21 | 21
(China) He HB (China) Bao YX | 10 | 21 | 16
2 | (China) Xu C (China) Ma J | 21 | 17 | 21

Quarterfinals
(Thailand) M Jongjit (Thailand) S Amitrapai | 20 | 9
4 | (Indonesia) T Ahmad (Indonesia) L Natsir | 22 | 21
(South Korea) Lee Y-d (South Korea) Ha J-e | 18 | 12
2 | (China) Xu C (China) Ma J | 21 | 21

Semifinals
4 | (Indonesia) T Ahmad (Indonesia) L Natsir | 17 | 14
2 | (China) Xu C (China) Ma J | 21 | 21

=== Finals ===
Semifinals
1 | (China) Zhang Nan (China) Zhao Yunlei | 21 | 21
(Malaysia) Chan Peng Soon (Malaysia) Goh Liu Ying | 13 | 16
4 | (Indonesia) Tontowi Ahmad (Indonesia) Liliyana Natsir | 17 | 14
2 | (China) Xu Chen (China) Ma Jin | 21 | 21

Final
1 | (China) Zhang Nan (China) Zhao Yunlei | 21 | 21
2 | (China) Xu Chen (China) Ma Jin | 12 | 9

| Preceded by 2011 Malaysia Super Series | Malaysia Super Series | Succeeded by 2013 Malaysia Super Series |
| Preceded by 2012 Korea Open | BWF Super Series; 2012 season | Succeeded by 2012 All England Super Series Premier |
