= 2011 All England Super Series Premier =

Badminton championships

Tournament details
- Dates: 8–13 March
- Edition: 10th
- Total prize money: US$350,000
- Venue: National Indoor Arena
- Location: Birmingham, England

Champions
- Men's singles: (Malaysia) Lee Chong Wei
- Women's singles: (China) Wang Shixian
- Men's doubles: (Denmark) Mathias Boe (Denmark) Carsten Mogensen
- Women's doubles: (China) Wang Xiaoli (China) Yu Yang
- Mixed doubles: (China) Xu Chen (China) Ma Jin

The 2011 All England Open Badminton Championships was the third super series tournament of the 2011 BWF Super Series. It was the second competition under the new format where a select group of Super Series events were elevated to premier status. The tournament was held in Birmingham, England from 8–13 March 2011 and had a total purse of $350,000.

== Men's singles ==
=== Seeds ===
1. (Malaysia) Lee Chong Wei (champion)
2. (Indonesia) Taufik Hidayat (first round)
3. (China) Lin Dan (final)
4. (Denmark) Peter Gade (quarter-finals)
5. (China) Chen Long (semi-finals)
6. (China) Chen Jin (second round)
7. (Vietnam) Nguyễn Tiến Minh (quarter-finals)
8. (Thailand) Boonsak Ponsana (quarter-finals)

=== Top half ===
First Round
1	(Malaysia) Lee C W	21	21
PFQ	(France) B Leverdez	9	11
(Indonesia) S D Kuncoro	10	6
(China) Bao CL	21	21
8	(Thailand) B Ponsana	21	21
(Indonesia) S Santoso	19	15
(Denmark) J Persson	13	13
Q1	(South Korea) Lee H-i	21	21
4	(Denmark) P Gade	21	21
(Hong Kong) Hu Y	14	15
(Japan) K Tago	21	21
(Poland) P Wacha	12	19
5	(China) Chen L	21	21
(South Korea) Son W-h	10	10
Q2	(Thailand) T Saensomboonsuk	21	21
Q4	(India) A Pawar	16	18

Second Round
1	(Malaysia) Lee C W	21	21
(China) Bao CL	16	16
8	(Thailand) B Ponsana	22	21
Q1	(South Korea) Lee H-i	20	12
4	(Denmark) P Gade	21	22
(Japan) K Tago	9	20
5	(China) Chen L	w	/	o
Q2	(Thailand) T Saensomboonsuk

Quarterfinals
1	(Malaysia) Lee C W	21	21
8	(Thailand) B Ponsana	15	7
4	(Denmark) P Gade	12	12
5	(China) Chen L	21	21

Semifinals
1	(Malaysia) Lee C W	21	21
5	(China) Chen L	17	13

=== Bottom half ===
First Round
(China) Du PY	13	21	21
(Denmark) J Ø. Jørgensen	21	11	14
(Netherlands) D Palyama	21	16	15
7	(Vietnam) Nguyễn T M	14	21	21
Q3	(India) A Jayaram	17	19
(Indonesia) D H Rumbaka	21	21
(Malaysia) Wong C H	14	17
3	(China) Lin D	21	21
(India) P Kashyap	11	21	17
(Germany) M Zwiebler	21	8	21
(England) R Ouseph	21	12
6	(China) Chen J	23	21
(South Korea) Park S-h	17	17
(China) Wang ZM	21	21
(Japan) K Yamada	21	21
2	(Indonesia) T Hidayat	10	14

Second Round
(China) Du PY	18	15
7	(Vietnam) Nguyễn T M	21	21
(Indonesia) D H Rumbaka	11	17
3	(China) Lin D	21	21
(Germany) M Zwiebler	21	22
6	(China) Chen J	18	20
(China) Wang ZM	15	21	16
(Japan) K Yamada	21	19	21

Quarterfinals
7	(Vietnam) Nguyễn T M	17	11
3	(China) Lin D	21	21
(Germany) M Zwiebler	21	17	21
(Japan) K Yamada	18	21	15

Semifinals
3	(China) Lin D	21	16	21
(Germany) M Zwiebler	9	21	11

=== Finals ===
Semifinals
1	(Malaysia) Lee Chong Wei	21	21
5	(China) Chen Long	17	13
3	(China) Lin Dan	21	16	21
(Germany) Marc Zwiebler	9	21	11

Final
1	(Malaysia) Lee Chong Wei	21	21
3	(China) Lin Dan	17	17

== Women's singles ==
=== Seeds ===
1. (China) Wang Shixian (champion)
2. (China) Wang Yihan (withdrew)
3. (China) Wang Xin (semi-finals)
4. (Denmark) Tine Baun (withdrew)
5. (India) Saina Nehwal (quarter-finals)
6. (China) Jiang Yanjiao (quarter-finals)
7. (Germany) Juliane Schenk (quarter-finals)
8. (South Korea) Bae Yeon-ju (second round)

=== Top half ===
First Round
1	(China) Wang SX	21	21
(Thailand) P Buranaprasertsuk	15	17
(China) Liu X	21	21
(Scotland) S Egelstaff	8	11
7	(Germany) J Schenk	22	21
(Hong Kong) Yip P Y	20	18
(Chinese Taipei) Cheng S-c	21	17	21
Q1	(Chinese Taipei) Pai H-m	14	21	8
3	(China) Wang X	21	21
(Malaysia) Wong M C	16	16
Q3	(Chinese Taipei) Chen H-h	8	21	12
(China) Li XR	21	16	21
6	(China) Jiang YJ	21	21
(Netherlands) Yao J	4	14
(Japan) S Sato	14	16
(China) Lu L	21	21

Second Round
1	(China) Wang SX	w	/	o
(China) Liu X
7	(Germany) J Schenk	21	21
(Chinese Taipei) Cheng S-c	13	14
3	(China) Wang X	w	/	o
(China) Li XR
6	(China) Jiang YJ	21	15	21
(China) Lu L	11	21	17

Quarterfinals
1	(China) Wang SX	17	21	21
7	(Germany) J Schenk	21	17	11
3	(China) Wang X	21	21
6	(China) Jiang YJ	12	15

Semifinals
1	(China) Wang SX	21	21
3	(China) Wang X	19	17

=== Bottom half ===
First Round
Q2	(Singapore) Gu J	8	21	21
Q4	(Hong Kong) Chan T K	21	10	18
(Thailand) R Intanon	21	18	12
8	(South Korea) Bae Y-j	8	21	21
(Japan) A Goto	16	21	20
(South Korea) Sung J-h	21	8	22
(Bulgaria) P Nedelcheva	21	21
PFQ	(England) E Cann	7	10
(Bulgaria) L Zetchiri	17	13
(Chinese Taipei) Tai T-y	21	21
(South Korea) Bae S-h	13	16
5	(India) S Nehwal	21	21
(Russia) E Diehl	14	11
(Japan) E Hirose	21	21
(Thailand) S Ponsana	21	21
PFQ	(Ukraine) L Griga	16	18

Second Round
Q2	(Singapore) Gu J	21	12	21
8	(South Korea) Bae Y-j	16	21	15
(South Korea) Sung J-h	9	20
(Bulgaria) P Nedelcheva	21	22
(Chinese Taipei) Tai T-y	17	17
5	(India) S Nehwal	21	21
(Japan) E Hirose	21	18	21
(Thailand) S Ponsana	13	21	13

Quarterfinals
Q2	(Singapore) Gu J	16	19
(Bulgaria) P Nedelcheva	21	21
5	(India) S Nehwal	11	20
(Japan) E Hirose	21	22

Semifinals
(Bulgaria) P Nedelcheva	15	20
(Japan) E Hirose	21	22

=== Finals ===
Semifinals
1	(China) Wang Shixian	21	21
3	(China) Wang Xin	19	17
(Bulgaria) Petya Nedelcheva	15	20
(Japan) Eriko Hirose	21	22

Final
1	(China) Wang Shixian	24	21
(Japan) Eriko Hirose	22	18

== Men's doubles ==
=== Seeds ===
1. (Denmark) Mathias Boe / Carsten Mogensen (champions)
2. (South Korea) Ko Sung-hyun / Yoo Yeon-seong (quarter-finals)
3. (South Korea) Jung Jae-sung / Lee Yong-dae (second round)
4. (Indonesia) Markis Kido / Hendra Setiawan (quarter-finals)
5. (Malaysia) Koo Kien Keat / Tan Boon Heong (final)
6. (China) Cai Yun / Fu Haifeng (semi-finals)
7. (Chinese Taipei) Fang Chieh-min / Lee Sheng-mu (first round)
8. (Indonesia) Mohammad Ahsan / Bona Septano (quarter-finals)

=== Top half ===
First Round
1	(Denmark) M Boe (Denmark) C Mogensen	18	21	21
(China) Hong W (China) Shen Y	21	9	12
(Denmark) M Conrad-Petersen (Denmark) J Rasmussen	21	21
(England) M Ellis (England) P Mills	6	10
7	(Chinese Taipei) Fang C-m (Chinese Taipei) Lee S-m	14	19
Q1	(Malaysia) M Z A Latif (Malaysia) Hoon T H	21	21
(Japan) H Endo (Japan) K Hayakawa	21	21
(Malaysia) Mak H C (Malaysia) Tan W K	16	18
3	(South Korea) Jung J-s (South Korea) Lee Y-d	24	13	21
(England) C Adcock (England) A Ellis	22	21	13
(South Korea) Kwon Y-g (South Korea) Shin B-c	21	19	15
(China) Chai B (China) Guo ZD	19	21	21
8	(Indonesia) M Ahsan (Indonesia) B Septano	21	19	21
(Malaysia) M F M Tazari (Malaysia) Ong S H	10	21	14
(India) R Kumar K. T. (India) S Thomas	21	21
(Malaysia) Gan T C (Malaysia) Tan B S	13	18

Second Round
1	(Denmark) M Boe (Denmark) C Mogensen	21	21
(Denmark) M Conrad-Petersen (Denmark) J Rasmussen	11	7
Q1	(Malaysia) M Z A Latif (Malaysia) Hoon T H	12	21	21
(Japan) H Endo (Japan) K Hayakawa	21	14	19
3	(South Korea) Jung J-s (South Korea) Lee Y-d	21	17	8
(China) Chai B (China) Guo ZD	13	21	21
8	(Indonesia) M Ahsan (Indonesia) B Septano	21	21
(India) R Kumar K. T. (India) S Thomas	16	16

Quarterfinals
1	(Denmark) M Boe (Denmark) C Mogensen	21	21
Q1	(Malaysia) M Z A Latif (Malaysia) Hoon T H	19	18
(China) Chai B (China) Guo ZD	21	21
8	(Indonesia) M Ahsan (Indonesia) B Septano	18	17

Semifinals
1	(Denmark) M Boe (Denmark) C Mogensen	26	21
(China) Chai B (China) Guo ZD	24	12

=== Bottom half ===
First Round
(Chinese Taipei) Chen H-l (Chinese Taipei) Lin Y-l	21	21
(Germany) I Kindervater (Germany) J Schöttler	17	19
Q2	(Russia) V Durkin (Russia) A Nikolaenko	13	13
5	(Malaysia) Koo K K (Malaysia) Tan B H	21	21
(Japan) H Hashimoto (Japan) N Hirata	21	21
(Thailand) S Anugritayawon (Thailand) S Prapakamol	11	16
Q3	(Malaysia) Chan P S (Malaysia) Lim K W	10	23
4	(Indonesia) M Kido (Indonesia) H Setiawan	21	25
(Poland) A Cwalina (Poland) M Łogosz	21	21
(Indonesia) A Yulianto (Indonesia) H A Gunawan	16	17
(United States) H Bach (United States) T Gunawan	21	17	17
6	(China) Cai Y (China) Fu HF	12	21	21
(Singapore) H Saputra (Singapore) C Triyachart	17	11
(Japan) N Kawamae (Japan) S Satō	21	21
Q4	(South Korea) Kim G-j (South Korea) Kim S-r	5	12
2	(South Korea) Ko S-h (South Korea) Yoo Y-s	21	21

Second Round
(Chinese Taipei) Chen H-l (Chinese Taipei) Lin Y-l	10	20
5	(Malaysia) Koo K K (Malaysia) Tan B H	21	22
(Japan) H Hashimoto (Japan) N Hirata	14	13
4	(Indonesia) M Kido (Indonesia) H Setiawan	21	21
(Poland) A Cwalina (Poland) M Łogosz	18	11
6	(China) Cai Y (China) Fu HF	21	21
(Japan) N Kawamae (Japan) S Satō	21	10	19
2	(South Korea) Ko S-h (South Korea) Yoo Y-s	16	21	21

Quarterfinals
5	(Malaysia) Koo K K (Malaysia) Tan B H	21	23	21
4	(Indonesia) M Kido (Indonesia) H Setiawan	19	25	11
6	(China) Cai Y (China) Fu HF	21	18	21
2	(South Korea) Ko S-h (South Korea) Yoo Y-s	17	21	17

Semifinals
5	(Malaysia) Koo K K (Malaysia) Tan B H	21	23
6	(China) Cai Y (China) Fu HF	11	21

=== Finals ===
Semifinals
1	(Denmark) Mathias Boe (Denmark) Carsten Mogensen	26	21
(China) Chai Biao (China) Guo Zhendong	24	12
5	(Malaysia) Koo Kien Keat (Malaysia) Tan Boon Heong	21	23
6	(China) Cai Yun (China) Fu Haifeng	11	21

Final
1	(Denmark) Mathias Boe (Denmark) Carsten Mogensen	15	21	21
5	(Malaysia) Koo Kien Keat (Malaysia) Tan Boon Heong	21	18	18

== Women's doubles ==
=== Seeds ===
1. (Chinese Taipei) Cheng Wen-hsing / Chien Yu-chin (quarter-finals)
2. (Japan) Miyuki Maeda / Satoko Suetsuna (first round)
3. (China) Wang Xiaoli / Yu Yang (champions)
4. (Thailand) Duanganong Aroonkesorn / Kunchala Voravichitchaikul (first round)
5. (Bulgaria) Petya Nedelcheva / (Russia) Anastasia Russkikh (quarter-finals)
6. (Russia) Valeria Sorokina / Nina Vislova (first round)
7. (Indonesia) Meiliana Jauhari / Greysia Polii (first round)
8. (Singapore) Shinta Mulia Sari / Yao Lei (first round)

=== Top half ===
First Round
1	(Chinese Taipei) Cheng W-h (Chinese Taipei) Chien Y-c	13	21	21
(England) J Wallwork (England) G White	21	13	16
Q4	(China) Cheng S (China) Ma J	21	21
(Germany) S Marinello (Germany) B Michels	5	6
7	(Indonesia) M Jauhari (Indonesia) G Polii	20	16
Q1	(Denmark) L Damkjær Kruse (Denmark) M Røpke	22	21
(Denmark) M Helsbøl (Denmark) A Skelbæk	11	18
(India) J Gutta (India) A Ponnappa	21	21
3	(China) Wang XL (China) Yu Y	21	21
(Sweden) E Lennartsson (Sweden) W Wengberg	6	10
Q2	(Thailand) S Amitrapai (Thailand) S Nessara	21	17	21
(England) M Agathangelou (England) H Olver	15	21	14
8	(Singapore) S M Sari (Singapore) Yao L	22	18	20
(South Korea) Ha J-e (South Korea) Kim M-j	20	21	22
(Chinese Taipei) Hsieh P-c (Chinese Taipei) Wang P-r	10	13
(Japan) M Matsutomo (Japan) A Takahashi	21	21

Second Round
1	(Chinese Taipei) Cheng W-h (Chinese Taipei) Chien Y-c	14	21	21
Q4	(China) Cheng S (China) Ma J	21	14	19
Q1	(Denmark) L Damkjær Kruse (Denmark) M Røpke	17	21	21
(India) J Gutta (India) A Ponnappa	21	19	18
3	(China) Wang XL (China) Yu Y	21	21
Q2	(Thailand) S Amitrapai (Thailand) S Nessara	16	13
(South Korea) Ha J-e (South Korea) Kim M-j	21	23	21
(Japan) M Matsutomo (Japan) A Takahashi	10	25	11

Quarterfinals
1	(Chinese Taipei) Cheng W-h (Chinese Taipei) Chien Y-c	18	25
Q1	(Denmark) L Damkjær Kruse (Denmark) M Røpke	21	27
3	(China) Wang XL (China) Yu Y	21	21
(South Korea) Ha J-e (South Korea) Kim M-j	11	10

Semifinals
Q1	(Denmark) L Damkjær Kruse (Denmark) M Røpke	10	21	9
3	(China) Wang XL (China) Yu Y	21	18	21

=== Bottom half ===
First Round
(South Korea) Kim H-n (South Korea) Kim M-s	21	21
(United States) I Wang (United States) R Wang	10	10
(China) Tian Q (China) Zhao YL	21	15	21
6	(Russia) V Sorokina (Russia) N Vislova	13	21	13
(Hong Kong) Poon L Y (Hong Kong) Tse Y S	21	18	17
(Japan) S Matsuo (Japan) M Naito	16	21	21
(China) Du J (China) Pan P	21	21
4	(Thailand) D Aroonkesorn (Thailand) K Voravichitchaikul	16	16
Q3	(Indonesia) L Nurlita (Thailand) S Thungthongkam	21	14	9
(South Korea) Chang Y-n (South Korea) Jung K-e	10	21	21
(Netherlands) L Jonathans (Netherlands) P van Dooremalen	13	15
5	(Bulgaria) P Nedelcheva (Russia) A Russkikh	21	21
(Canada) N Grether (Canada) C Reid	17	11
(Japan) M Fujii (Japan) R Kakiiwa	21	21
(Denmark) C Pedersen (Denmark) K Rytter Juhl	14	23	21
2	(Japan) M Maeda (Japan) S Suetsuna	21	21	13

Second Round
(South Korea) Kim H-n (South Korea) Kim M-s	18	18
(China) Tian Q (China) Zhao YL	21	21
(Japan) S Matsuo (Japan) M Naito	21	21
(China) Du J (China) Pan P	17	19
(South Korea) Chang Y-n (South Korea) Jung K-e	18	15
5	(Bulgaria) P Nedelcheva (Russia) A Russkikh	21	21
(Japan) M Fujii (Japan) R Kakiiwa	21	17	21
(Denmark) C Pedersen (Denmark) K Rytter Juhl	12	21	15

Quarterfinals
(China) Tian Q (China) Zhao YL	19	21	22
(Japan) S Matsuo (Japan) M Naito	21	15	24
5	(Bulgaria) P Nedelcheva (Russia) A Russkikh	15	19
(Japan) M Fujii (Japan) R Kakiiwa	21	21

Semifinals
(Japan) S Matsuo (Japan) M Naito	19	17
(Japan) M Fujii (Japan) R Kakiiwa	21	21

=== Finals ===
Semifinals
Q1	(Denmark) Line Damkjær Kruse (Denmark) Marie Røpke	10	21	9
3	(China) Wang Xiaoli (China) Yu Yang	21	18	21
(Japan) Shizuka Matsuo (Japan) Mami Naito	19	17
(Japan) Mizuki Fujii (Japan) Reika Kakiiwa	21	21

Final
3	(China) Wang Xiaoli (China) Yu Yang	21	21
(Japan) Mizuki Fujii (Japan) Reika Kakiiwa	2	9

== Mixed doubles ==
=== Seeds ===
1. (China) Zhang Nan / Zhao Yunlei (quarter-finals)
2. (Denmark) Thomas Laybourn / Kamilla Rytter Juhl (withdrew)
3. (Thailand) Sudket Prapakamol / Saralee Thungthongkam (final)
4. (Poland) Robert Mateusiak / Nadieżda Zięba (quarter-finals)
5. (China) Tao Jiaming / Tian Qing (quarter-finals)
6. (South Korea) Ko Sung-hyun / Ha Jung-eun (first round)
7. (Indonesia) Tontowi Ahmad / Liliyana Natsir (second round)
8. (Chinese Taipei) Chen Hung-ling / Cheng Wen-hsing (second round)

=== Top half ===
First Round
1	(China) Zhang N (China) Zhao YL	9	21	21
Q4	(Russia) A Nikolaenko (Russia) V Sorokina	21	14	18
(Indonesia) F Kurniawan (Indonesia) P Z Bernadet	11	15
(China) He HB (China) Yu Y	21	21
6	(South Korea) Ko S-h (South Korea) Ha J-e	12	15
(China) Xu C (China) Ma J	21	21
(Japan) S Ikeda (Japan) R Shiota	12	19
(England) C Adcock (Scotland) I Bankier	21	21
4	(Poland) R Mateusiak (Poland) N Zięba	21	21
Q1	(Indonesia) N Widianto (Indonesia) V Marissa	14	19
(Indonesia) M Rijal (Indonesia) D Susanto	16	19
(England) N Robertson (England) J Wallwork	21	21
7	(Indonesia) T Ahmad (Indonesia) L Natsir	21	7	21
(Malaysia) Chan P S (Malaysia) Goh L Y	12	21	19
(Germany) M Fuchs (Germany) B Michels	21	21
(Denmark) M Pieler Kolding (Denmark) J Houmann	11	19

Second Round
1	(China) Zhang N (China) Zhao YL	21	21
(China) He HB (China) Yu Y	16	13
(China) Xu C (China) Ma J	14	21	21
(England) C Adcock (Scotland) I Bankier	21	14	13
4	(Poland) R Mateusiak (Poland) N Zięba	21	21
(England) N Robertson (England) J Wallwork	19	15
7	(Indonesia) T Ahmad (Indonesia) L Natsir	14	21	14
(Germany) M Fuchs (Germany) B Michels	21	19	21

Quarterfinals
1	(China) Zhang N (China) Zhao YL	21	23	15
(China) Xu C (China) Ma J	12	25	21
4	(Poland) R Mateusiak (Poland) N Zięba	21	18	18
(Germany) M Fuchs (Germany) B Michels	17	21	21

Semifinals
(China) Xu C (China) Ma J	21	21
(Germany) M Fuchs (Germany) B Michels	19	17

=== Bottom half ===
First Round
(India) V. Diju (India) J Gutta	21	21	25
(South Korea) Yoo Y-s (South Korea) Kim M-j	23	13	23
Q2	(Denmark) M Delbo Larsen (Denmark) M Schjøtt-Kristensen	18	13
5	(China) Tao JM (China) Tian Q	21	21
(Thailand) P Chalardchaleam (Thailand) S Amitrapai	19	13
(Scotland) R Blair (England) G White	21	21
(Singapore) C Triyachart (Singapore) Yao L	12	21	16
3	(Thailand) S Prapakamol (Thailand) S Thungthongkam	21	17	21
(Indonesia) H Setiawan (Russia) A Russkikh	21	21
(Ukraine) V Atrashchenkov (Ukraine) E Prus	10	10
(Thailand) S Anugritayawon (Thailand) K Voravichitchaikul	17	15
8	(Chinese Taipei) Chen H-l (Chinese Taipei) Cheng W-h	21	21
Q3	(Japan) N Hirata (Japan) M Maeda	10	20
(Denmark) J Fischer Nielsen (Denmark) C Pedersen	21	22
(Chinese Taipei) Lee S-m (Chinese Taipei) Chien Y-c	24	21
PFQ	(Japan) H Hashimoto (Japan) M Fujii	22	12

Second Round
(India) V. Diju (India) J Gutta	11	12
5	(China) Tao JM (China) Tian Q	21	21
(Scotland) R Blair (England) G White	15	21	16
3	(Thailand) S Prapakamol (Thailand) S Thungthongkam	21	16	21
(Indonesia) H Setiawan (Russia) A Russkikh	21	21
8	(Chinese Taipei) Chen H-l (Chinese Taipei) Cheng W-h	15	13
(Denmark) J Fischer Nielsen (Denmark) C Pedersen	21	21
(Chinese Taipei) Lee S-m (Chinese Taipei) Chien Y-c	7	12

Quarterfinals
5	(China) Tao JM (China) Tian Q	21	18	14
3	(Thailand) S Prapakamol (Thailand) S Thungthongkam	4	21	21
(Indonesia) H Setiawan (Russia) A Russkikh	21	12	21
(Denmark) J Fischer Nielsen (Denmark) C Pedersen	16	21	14

Semifinals
3	(Thailand) S Prapakamol (Thailand) S Thungthongkam	21	21
(Indonesia) H Setiawan (Russia) A Russkikh	15	17

=== Finals ===
Semifinals
(China) Xu Chen (China) Ma Jin	21	21
(Germany) Michael Fuchs (Germany) Birgit Michels	19	17
3	(Thailand) Sudket Prapakamol (Thailand) Saralee Thungthongkam	21	21
(Indonesia) Hendra Setiawan (Russia) Anastasia Russkikh	15	17

Final
(China) Xu Chen (China) Ma Jin	21	21
3	(Thailand) Sudket Prapakamol (Thailand) Saralee Thungthongkam	13	9

Preceded by 2011 Korea Open Super Series Premier	BWF Super Series; 2011 season	Succeeded by 2011 India Super Series
