= Badminton at the 2012 Summer Olympics – Women's doubles =

Badminton women's doubles at the Games of the XXX Olympiad
- Venue: Wembley Arena
- Date: 28 July to 4 August 2012
- Competitors: 32 from 13 nations

Medalists
1st place, gold medalist(s)		Tian Qing; Zhao Yunlei	China
2nd place, silver medalist(s)		Mizuki Fujii; Reika Kakiiwa	Japan
3rd place, bronze medalist(s)		Valeria Sorokina; Nina Vislova	Russia

The badminton women's doubles tournament at the 2012 Olympic Games in London took place from 28 July to 4 August at Wembley Arena.

The draw for the tournament was made on 23 July 2012. Thirty-two players from 13 nations competed in the event.

China's Tian Qing and Zhao Yunlei defeated Japan's Mizuki Fujii and Reika Kakiiwa 21–10, 25–23, to win the gold medal in women's doubles badminton at the 2012 Summer Olympics. Zhao became the first badminton player to win two Olympic gold medals at the same Olympics, having also won the mixed doubles event with Zhang Nan. In the bronze-medal match, Russia's Valeria Sorokina and Nina Vislova defeated Alexandra Bruce and Michelle Li of Canada, 21–9, 21–10, to win Russia's first Olympic medal in badminton.

Chinese pair Du Jing and Yu Yang were the defending Olympic champions, but Du chose not to participate due to injury. Yu partnered with Wang Xiaoli, but the pair and six other players (Note: South Korea: Jung Kyung-eun Kim Ha-na Ha Jung-eun Kim Min-jung Indonesia: Meiliana Jauhari Greysia Polii) were disqualified from the event due to a match throwing scandal.

== Competition format ==
The tournament started with a group phase round-robin followed by a knockout stage.

== Seeds ==
1. Wang Xiaoli / Yu Yang (CHN) (group stage, disqualified)
2. Tian Qing / Zhao Yunlei (CHN) (gold medalists)
3. Ha Jung-eun / Kim Min-jung (KOR) (group stage, disqualified)
4. Mizuki Fujii / Reika Kakiiwa (JPN) (silver medalists)

== Results ==
=== Group stage ===
==== Group A ====
Team	Pld	W	L	SW	SL	Pts
Jung Kyung-eun / Kim Ha-na (KOR)	3	3	0	6	0	DQ
Wang Xiaoli / Yu Yang (CHN)	3	2	1	4	2	DQ
Valeria Sorokina / Nina Vislova (RUS)	3	1	2	2	4	1
Alexandra Bruce / Michelle Li (CAN)	3	0	3	0	6	0

Team 1	Score	Team 2
28 July, 19:05
Wang X / Yu Y (CHN)	21–11; 21–7	Bruce / Li (CAN)
29 July, 09:40
Jung K-e / Kim H-n (KOR)	21–5; 21–11	Bruce / Li (CAN)
29 July, 18:30
Wang X / Yu Y (CHN)	21–6; 21–9	Sorokina / Vislova (RUS)
30 July, 09:40
Jung K-e / Kim H-n (KOR)	23–21; 21–18	Sorokina / Vislova (RUS)
31 July, 08:30
Sorokina / Vislova (RUS)	21–8; 21–10	Bruce / Li (CAN)
31 July, 19:07
Wang X / Yu Y (CHN)	14–21; 11–21	Jung K-e / Kim H-n (KOR)

==== Group B ====
Team	Pld	W	L	SW	SL	Pts
Cheng Wen-hsing / Chien Yu-chin (TPE)	3	2	1	5	3	2
Mizuki Fujii / Reika Kakiiwa (JPN)	3	2	1	4	3	2
Jwala Gutta / Ashwini Ponnappa (IND)	3	2	1	4	3	2
Shinta Mulia Sari / Yao Lei (SIN)	3	0	3	2	6	0

Team 1	Score	Team 2
28 July, 15:20
Fujii / Kakiiwa (JPN)	21–16; 21–18	Gutta / Ponnappa (IND)
28 July, 20:15
Cheng W-h / Chien Y-c (TPE)	18–21; 21–15; 21–15	Sari / Yao L (SIN)
29 July, 14:17
Fujii / Kakiiwa (JPN)	16–21; 21–10; 21–19	Sari / Yao L (SIN)
30 July, 19:05
Cheng W-h / Chien Y-c (TPE)	23–25; 21–16; 18–21	Gutta / Ponnappa (IND)
31 July, 13:09
Fujii / Kakiiwa (JPN)	19–21; 11–21	Cheng W-h / Chien Y-c (TPE)
31 July, 18:30
Sari / Yao L (SIN)	16–21; 15–21	Gutta / Ponnappa (IND)

==== Group C ====
Team	Pld	W	L	SW	SL	Pts
Ha Jung-eun / Kim Min-jung (KOR)	3	3	0	6	1	DQ
Meiliana Jauhari / Greysia Polii (INA)	3	2	1	5	3	DQ
Leanne Choo / Renuga Veeran (AUS)	3	1	2	3	4	1
Michelle Edwards / Annari Viljoen (RSA)	3	0	3	0	6	0

Team 1	Score	Team 2
28 July, 14:17
Ha J-e / Kim M-j (KOR)	21–8; 21–7	Edwards / Viljoen (RSA)
28 July, 19:42
Jauhari / Polii (INA)	21–13; 20–22; 21–11	Choo / Veeran (AUS)
29 July, 20:52
Choo / Veeran (AUS)	21–9; 21–7	Edwards / Viljoen (RSA)
30 July, 15:20
Jauhari / Polii (INA)	21–18; 21–10	Edwards / Viljoen (RSA)
30 July, 19:09
Ha J-e / Kim M-j (KOR)	21–7; 21–19	Choo / Veeran (AUS)
31 July, 20:19
Ha J-e / Kim M-j (KOR)	18–21; 21–14; 21–12	Jauhari / Polii (INA)

==== Group D ====
Team	Pld	W	L	SW	SL	Pts
Kamilla Rytter Juhl / Christinna Pedersen (DEN)	3	2	1	5	3	2
Tian Qing / Zhao Yunlei (CHN)	3	2	1	4	2	2
Miyuki Maeda / Satoko Suetsuna (JPN)	3	2	1	4	3	2
Poon Lok Yan / Tse Ying Suet (HKG)	3	0	3	1	6	0

Team 1	Score	Team 2
28 July, 09:07
Juhl / Pedersen (DEN)	21–18; 14–21; 17–21	Maeda / Suetsuna (JPN)
28 July, 09:44
Tian Q / Zhao Y (CHN)	21–11; 21–12	Poon / Tse (HKG)
29 July, 09:44
Juhl / Pedersen (DEN)	21–13; 14–21; 21–18	Poon / Tse (HKG)
30 July, 09:44
Tian Q / Zhao Y (CHN)	21–16; 21–17	Maeda / Suetsuna (JPN)
31 July, 09:40
Tian Q / Zhao Y (CHN)	20–22; 12–21	Juhl / Pedersen (DEN)
31 July, 14:15
Maeda / Suetsuna (JPN)	21–15; 21–19	Poon / Tse (HKG)

=== Finals ===
Quarter-finals
A1	Valeria Sorokina (RUS); Nina Vislova (RUS)	21	21
C2	Michelle Edwards (RSA); Annari Viljoen (RSA)	9	7
B1	Cheng Wen-hsing (TPE); Chien Yu-chin (TPE)	10	14
D2	Tian Qing (CHN); Zhao Yunlei (CHN)	21	21
A2	Alex Bruce (CAN); Michelle Li (CAN)	21	18	21
C1	Leanne Choo (AUS); Renuga Veeran (AUS)	9	21	18
B2	Mizuki Fujii (JPN); Reika Kakiiwa (JPN)	22	21
D1	Christinna Pedersen (DEN); Kamilla Rytter Juhl (DEN)	20	10

Semi-finals
A1	Valeria Sorokina (RUS); Nina Vislova (RUS)	19	6
D2	Tian Qing (CHN); Zhao Yunlei (CHN)	21	21
A2	Alex Bruce (CAN); Michelle Li (CAN)	12	21	13
B2	Mizuki Fujii (JPN); Reika Kakiiwa (JPN)	21	19	21

Final
D2	Tian Qing (CHN); Zhao Yunlei (CHN)	21	25
B2	Mizuki Fujii (JPN); Reika Kakiiwa (JPN)	10	23
Bronze-medal match
A1	Valeria Sorokina (RUS); Nina Vislova (RUS)	21	21
A2	Alex Bruce (CAN); Michelle Li (CAN)	9	10

== Group stage disqualifications ==
A review into two matches in the badminton women's doubles competition played on 31 July was conducted after it appeared that, having already qualified for the knockout stages, players on both sides in each match had been attempting to lose their last group stage matches in order to gain a more favourable draw in the quarter-finals.

The matches in question were between China's Wang Xiaoli / Yu Yang and South Korea's Jung Kyung-eun / Kim Ha-na in Group A, and South Korea's Ha Jung-eun / Kim Min-jung versus Indonesia's Meiliana Jauhari / Greysia Polii in Group C. After errors began occurring during routine shots in both matches, including shots going long and serves hitting the net, the crowd reacted angrily, and the first game in the match between Yu Yang and Wang Xiaoli of China and Jung Kyung-eun and Kim Ha-na of South Korea featured no rallies of more than four shots.

South Korean head coach Sung Han-kook said his pairs had emulated the Chinese tactics so as to avoid playing against another South Korean team in the knockout stages before the final: "Because they don't want to play the semi-final against each other, so we did the same. We didn't want to play the South Korean team again".

In the second match, the tournament referee, Torsten Berg, initially issued a black card to disqualify the players, but this was rescinded after the teams' coaches and officials came onto the court and remonstrated with him. Play was allowed to continue while he monitored proceedings, and both the earlier match and this later match were ultimately played to a conclusion, completing the draw for the quarter-finals (groups B and D having concluded earlier in the day).

Technical delegate Paisan Rangsikitpho said after the Group A match, "If it's true what I hear, this is a shame and I don't like it. And I'm not going to accept anything that I don't like at all. It's not in a good spirit....I apologise to the public, I apologise for everyone and I am not happy."

On 1 August 2012, following a Badminton World Federation review, all eight players were found guilty of "not using one's best efforts to win a match" and "conducting oneself in a manner that is clearly abusive or detrimental to the sport" and were ejected from the tournament. The quarter-finals then continued with the ejected teams being replaced by the other teams from their groups.

The decision was highly debated; some argued that while the teams had not been performing their best effort to win the game at hand, they had been in fact doing their best to win the tournament, and that conserving resources in early matches is a common practice in every competitive sport.

To prevent any repeat of these events, the competition format for the next Olympics was changed: all pairs finishing second in their groups would be placed into another draw to determine who they faced in the quarter-finals, while the top pair in each group would have a fixed position matched to its designated seed in the knockout phase.
