= Canadian International =

Canadian International may refer to:

- Canadian International (badminton), a badminton tournament
- Canadian International Stakes, a stakes race
