= Mizuki Fujii =

Japanese badminton player (born 1988)

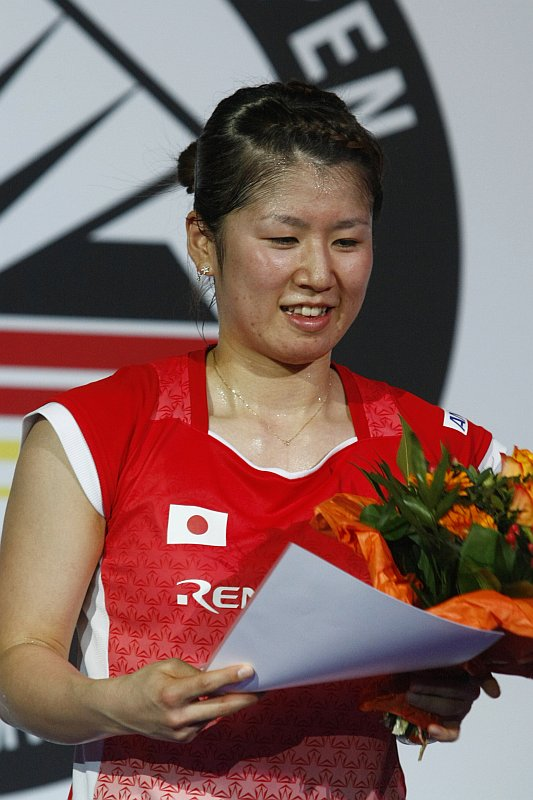

Personal information
- Born: 5 August 1988 (age 38) Ashikita, Kumamoto, Japan
- Height: 1.60 m (5 ft 3 in)
- Weight: 60 kg (132 lb)

Sport
- Country: Japan
- Sport: Badminton
- Handedness: Right
- Retired: 28 February 2019

Women's & mixed doubles
- Highest ranking: 3 (WD 5 January 2012); 15 (XD 16 September 2010)
- BWF profile
Medal record
Women's badminton
Representing Japan
Olympic Games
Silver medal – second place	2012 London	Women's doubles
Uber Cup
Bronze medal – third place	2012 Wuhan	Women's team
Bronze medal – third place	2010 Kuala Lumpur	Women's team
Asian Junior Championships
Bronze medal – third place	2006 Kuala Lumpur	Girls' doubles

Mizuki Fujii (藤井 瑞希, Fujii Mizuki; born 5 August 1988) is a Japanese badminton player. She is from Ashikita, Kumamoto and plays for the Renesas badminton club. Fujii concentrates on doubles badminton. Most of her success has come with women's doubles partner Reika Kakiiwa. Together they reached the final of the 2010 Korea Open Super Series, their first major final as a pair. She also assisted her team in winning the bronze medal at the 2010 Uber Cup. In the mixed doubles she pairs with Hirokatsu Hashimoto. Her career highest achievement was the silver medal in the women's doubles at the 2012 London Summer Olympics with Kakiiwa. She retired from professional badminton after the win at London.

== Achievements ==
=== Olympic Games ===
Women's doubles
Year	Venue	Partner	Opponent	Score	Result
2012	Wembley Arena; London, Great Britain	(Japan) Reika Kakiiwa	(China) Tian Qing (China) Zhao Yunlei	10–21, 23–25	Silver

=== Asian Junior Championships ===
Girls' doubles
Year	Venue	Partner	Opponent	Score	Result
2006	Kuala Lumpur Badminton Stadium; Kuala Lumpur, Malaysia	(Japan) Yuriko Miki	(China) Ma Jin (China) Wang Xiaoli	10–21, 12–21	Bronze

=== BWF Superseries ===
The BWF Superseries, launched on 14 December 2006 and implemented in 2007, is a series of elite badminton tournaments, sanctioned by Badminton World Federation (BWF). BWF Superseries has two level such as Superseries and Superseries Premier. A season of Superseries features twelve tournaments around the world, which introduced since 2011, with successful players invited to the Superseries Finals held at the year end.

Women's doubles
Year	Tournament	Partner	Opponent	Score	Result	Ref.
2010	Korea Open	(Japan) Reika Kakiiwa	(China) Cheng Shu (China) Zhao Yunlei	16–21, 15–21	(silver) Runner-up	
2011	All England Open	(Japan) Reika Kakiiwa	(China) Wang Xiaoli (China) Yu Yang	2–21, 9–21	(silver) Runner-up	
2011	India Open	(Japan) Reika Kakiiwa	(Japan) Miyuki Maeda (Japan) Satoko Suetsuna	24–26, 15–21	(silver) Runner-up	

BWF Super Series Finals tournament
BWF Super Series Premier tournament
BWF Super Series tournament

=== BWF Grand Prix ===
The BWF Grand Prix had two levels, the BWF Grand Prix and Grand Prix Gold. It was a series of badminton tournaments sanctioned by the Badminton World Federation (BWF) which was held from 2007 to 2017.

Women's doubles
Year	Tournament	Partner	Opponent	Score	Result	Ref.
2010	Dutch Open	(Japan) Reika Kakiiwa	(Russia) Valeria Sorokina (Russia) Nina Vislova	19-21, 19–21	(silver) Runner-up	
2011	German Open	(Japan) Reika Kakiiwa	(South Korea) Ha Jung-eun (South Korea) Kim Min-jung	21-6, 21–14	(gold) Winner	
2011	Bitburger Open	(Japan) Reika Kakiiwa	(Sweden) Emelie Lennartsson (Sweden) Emma Wengberg	21-8, 21–11	(gold) Winner	

Mixed doubles
Year	Tournament	Partner	Opponent	Score	Result	Ref.
2011	Australian Open	(Japan) Hirokatsu Hashimoto	(Thailand) Songphon Anugritayawon (Thailand) Kunchala Voravichitchaikul	15–21, 9–21	(silver) Runner-up	

BWF Grand Prix Gold tournament
BWF Grand Prix tournament

=== BWF International Challenge/Series ===
Women's singles
Year	Tournament	Opponent	Score	Result	Ref.
2008	Australian International	(Japan) Megumi Taruno	21–16, 21–17	(gold) Winner	

Women's doubles
Year	Tournament	Partner	Opponent	Score	Result	Ref.
2008	Canadian International	(Japan) Reika Kakiiwa	(Japan) Aki Akao (Japan) Tomomi Matsuda	21–15, 21–15	(gold) Winner	
2009	Austrian International	(Japan) Reika Kakiiwa	(Japan) Shizuka Matsuo (Japan) Mami Naito	15–21, 18–21	(silver) Runner-up	
2010	Osaka International	(Japan) Reika Kakiiwa	(Japan) Misaki Matsutomo (Japan) Ayaka Takahashi	21–19, 21–16	(gold) Winner	
2018	Belgian International	(Japan) Nao Ono	(France) Delphine Delrue (France) Léa Palermo	19–21, 14–21	(silver) Runner-up	

Mixed doubles
Year	Tournament	Partner	Opponent	Score	Result	Ref.
2010	Osaka International	(Japan) Hirokatsu Hashimoto	(Japan) Kenichi Hayakawa (Japan) Shizuka Matsuo	14–21, 11–21	(silver) Runner-up	

BWF International Challenge tournament
BWF International Series tournament

== Record against selected opponents ==
Women's doubles results with Reika Kakiiwa against Super Series finalists, Worlds Semi-finalists, and Olympic quarterfinalists.

- (Australia) Leanne Choo & Renuga Veeran 2–0
- (Bulgaria) / (Russia) Petya Nedelcheva & Anastasia Russkikh 1–0
- (Canada) Alex Bruce & Michelle Li 1–0
- (China) Du Jing & Yu Yang 0–1
- (China) Xia Huan & Tang Jinhua 1–2
- (China) Cheng Shu & Zhao Yunlei 0–4
- (China) Wang Xiaoli & Yu Yang 0–4
- (China) Bao Yixin & Zhong Qianxin 0–4
- (China) Tian Qing & Zhao Yunlei 1–3
- (Chinese Taipei) Cheng Wen-hsing & Chien Yu-chin 2–4
- (Denmark) Christinna Pedersen & Kamilla Rytter Juhl 2–3
- (Hong Kong) Poon Lok Yan & Tse Ying Suet 4–0
- (India) Jwala Gutta & Ashwini Ponnappa 3–1
- (Indonesia) Vita Marissa & Nadya Melati 1–2
- (Japan) Miyuki Maeda & Satoko Suetsuna 0–2
- (Japan) Shizuka Matsuo & Mami Naito 4–3
- (South Korea) Ha Jung-eun & Kim Min-jung 3–3
- (South Korea) Jung Kyung-eun & Kim Ha-na 1–3
- (Malaysia) Chin Eei Hui & Wong Pei Tty 4–2
- (Russia) Valeria Sorokina & Nina Vislova 4–2
- (Singapore) Jiang Yanmei & Li Yujia 0–1
- (Singapore) Shinta Mulia Sari & Yao Lei 3–1
- (Thailand) Duanganong Aroonkesorn & Kunchala Voravichitchaikul 2–1
