= Reika Kakiiwa =

Japanese badminton player (born 1989)

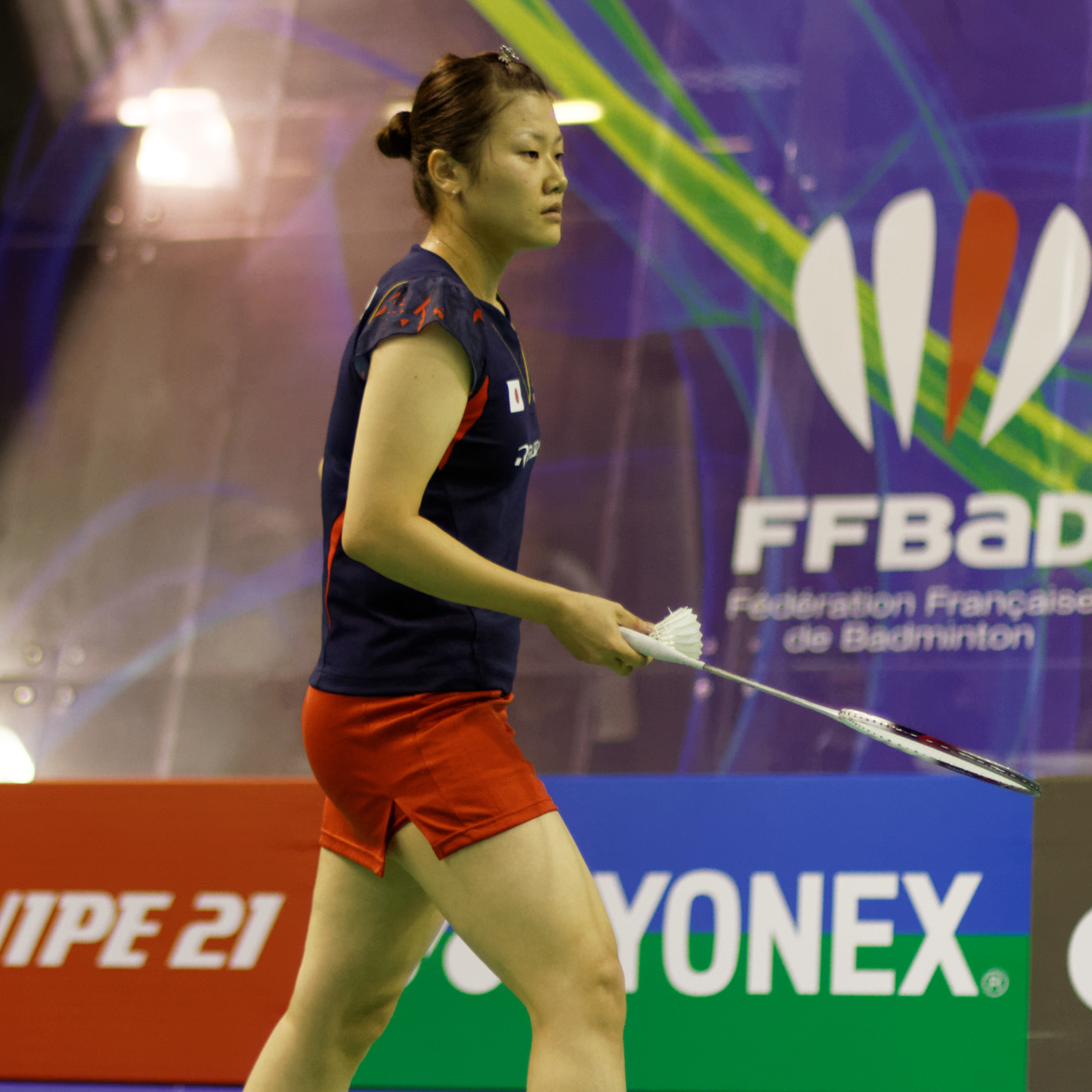
- Reika Kakiiwa at the 2013 French Super Series.

Personal information
- Born: July 19, 1989 (age 37) Kami-Amakusa, Kumamoto, Japan
- Height: 1.66 m (5 ft 5 in)
- Weight: 64 kg (141 lb)

Sport
- Country: Japan
- Sport: Badminton
- Handedness: Right
- Retired: 31 March 2019

Women's doubles
- Highest ranking: 3 (5 January 2012)
- BWF profile
Medal record
Women's badminton
Representing Japan
Olympic Games
Silver medal – second place	2012 London	Women's doubles
World Championships
Bronze medal – third place	2014 Copenhagen	Women's doubles
Sudirman Cup
Silver medal – second place	2015 Dongguan	Mixed team
Uber Cup
Silver medal – second place	2014 New Delhi	Women's team
Bronze medal – third place	2012 Wuhan	Women's team
Bronze medal – third place	2010 Kuala Lumpur	Women's team
Asian Games
Bronze medal – third place	2014 Incheon	Women's team
Asian Junior Championships
Bronze medal – third place	2007 Kuala Lumpur	Mixed team

Reika Kakiiwa (垣岩 令佳, Kakiiwa Reika; born 19 July 1989) is a Japanese badminton player affiliated with Renesas badminton club. Reika Kakiiwa has gained prominence in the badminton community because of her success in women's doubles. She has reached a career high ranking of third in the world with her partner Mizuki Fujii. She has also competed in mixed doubles reaching a peak ranking of 51st with her partner Kenta Kazuno.

== Awards ==
In 2012, she and her partner Mizuki Fujii received the Kumamoto Prefecture Citizen Honour's Award. She also received the Sports Special Award by Otsu City.

== Achievements ==
=== Olympic Games ===
Women's doubles
Year	Venue	Partner	Opponent	Score	Result
2012	Wembley Arena; London, Great Britain	(Japan) Mizuki Fujii	(China) Tian Qing (China) Zhao Yunlei	10–21, 23–25	Silver

=== World Championships ===
Women's doubles
Year	Venue	Partner	Opponent	Score	Result	Ref.
2014	Ballerup Super Arena; Copenhagen, Denmark	(Japan) Miyuki Maeda	(China) Wang Xiaoli (China) Yu Yang	8–21, 13–21	Bronze	

=== BWF Superseries ===
The BWF Superseries, which was launched on 14 December 2006 and implemented in 2007, is a series of elite badminton tournaments, sanctioned by the Badminton World Federation (BWF). BWF Superseries levels are Superseries and Superseries Premier. A season of Superseries consists of twelve tournaments around the world that have been introduced since 2011. Successful players are invited to the Superseries Finals, which are held at the end of each year.

Women's doubles
Year	Tournament	Partner	Opponent	Score	Result	Ref.
2010	Korea Open	(Japan) Mizuki Fujii	(China) Cheng Shu (China) Zhao Yunlei	16–21, 15–21	(silver) Runner-up	
2011	All England Open	(Japan) Mizuki Fujii	(China) Wang Xiaoli (China) Yu Yang	2–21, 9–21	(silver) Runner-up	
2011	India Open	(Japan) Mizuki Fujii	(Japan) Miyuki Maeda (Japan) Satoko Suetsuna	24–26, 15–21	(silver) Runner-up	
2014	Japan Open	(Japan) Miyuki Maeda	(Japan) Misaki Matsutomo (Japan) Ayaka Takahashi	13–21, 17–21	(silver) Runner-up	

BWF Super Series Finals tournament
BWF Super Series Premier tournament
BWF Super Series tournament

=== BWF Grand Prix ===
The BWF Grand Prix had two levels, the BWF Grand Prix and Grand Prix Gold. It was a series of badminton tournaments sanctioned by the Badminton World Federation (BWF) which was held from 2007 to 2017.

Women's doubles
Year	Tournament	Partner	Opponent	Score	Result	Ref.
2010	Dutch Open	(Japan) Mizuki Fujii	(Russia) Valeria Sorokina (Russia) Nina Vislova	19–21, 19–21	(silver) Runner-up	
2011	German Open	(Japan) Mizuki Fujii	(South Korea) Ha Jung-eun (South Korea) Kim Min-jung	21–6, 21–14	(gold) Winner	
2011	Bitburger Open	(Japan) Mizuki Fujii	(Sweden) Emelie Lennartsson (Sweden) Emma Wengberg	21–8, 21–11	(gold) Winner	

BWF Grand Prix Gold tournament
BWF Grand Prix tournament

=== BWF International Challenge/Series ===
Women's doubles
Year	Tournament	Partner	Opponent	Score	Result	Ref.
2008	Canadian International	(Japan) Mizuki Fujii	(Japan) Aki Akao (Japan) Tomomi Matsuda	21–15, 21–15	(gold) Winner	
2009	Austrian International	(Japan) Mizuki Fujii	(Japan) Shizuka Matsuo (Japan) Mami Naito	15–21, 18–21	(silver) Runner-up	
2010	Osaka International	(Japan) Mizuki Fujii	(Japan) Misaki Matsutomo (Japan) Ayaka Takahashi	21–19, 21–16	(gold) Winner	

BWF International Challenge tournament
BWF International Series tournament

== Record against selected opponents ==
Women's doubles results with Mizuki Fujii against Super Series finalists, Worlds Semi-finalists, and Olympic quarterfinalists.

- (Australia) Leanne Choo & Renuga Veeran 2–0
- (Bulgaria) / (Russia) Petya Nedelcheva & Anastasia Russkikh 1–0
- (Canada) Alex Bruce & Michelle Li 1–0
- (China) Du Jing & Yu Yang 0–1
- (China) Xia Huan & Tang Jinhua 1–2
- (China) Cheng Shu & Zhao Yunlei 0–4
- (China) Wang Xiaoli & Yu Yang 0–4
- (China) Bao Yixin & Zhong Qianxin 0–4
- (China) Tian Qing & Zhao Yunlei 1–3
- (Chinese Taipei) Cheng Wen-hsing & Chien Yu-chin 2–4
- (Denmark) Christinna Pedersen & Kamilla Rytter Juhl 2–3
- (Hong Kong) Poon Lok Yan & Tse Ying Suet 4–0
- (India) Jwala Gutta & Ashwini Ponnappa 3–1
- (Indonesia) Vita Marissa & Nadya Melati 1–2
- (Japan) Miyuki Maeda & Satoko Suetsuna 0–2
- (Japan) Shizuka Matsuo & Mami Naito 4–3
- (South Korea) Ha Jung-eun & Kim Min-jung 3–3
- (South Korea) Jung Kyung-eun & Kim Ha-na 1–3
- (Malaysia) Chin Eei Hui & Wong Pei Tty 4–2
- (Russia) Valeria Sorokina & Nina Vislova 4–2
- (Singapore) Jiang Yanmei & Li Yujia 0–1
- (Singapore) Shinta Mulia Sari & Yao Lei 3–1
- (Thailand) Duanganong Aroonkesorn & Kunchala Voravichitchaikul 2–1
