= Poon Lok Yan =

Chinese badminton player (born 1991)

Poon Lok Yan 潘樂恩
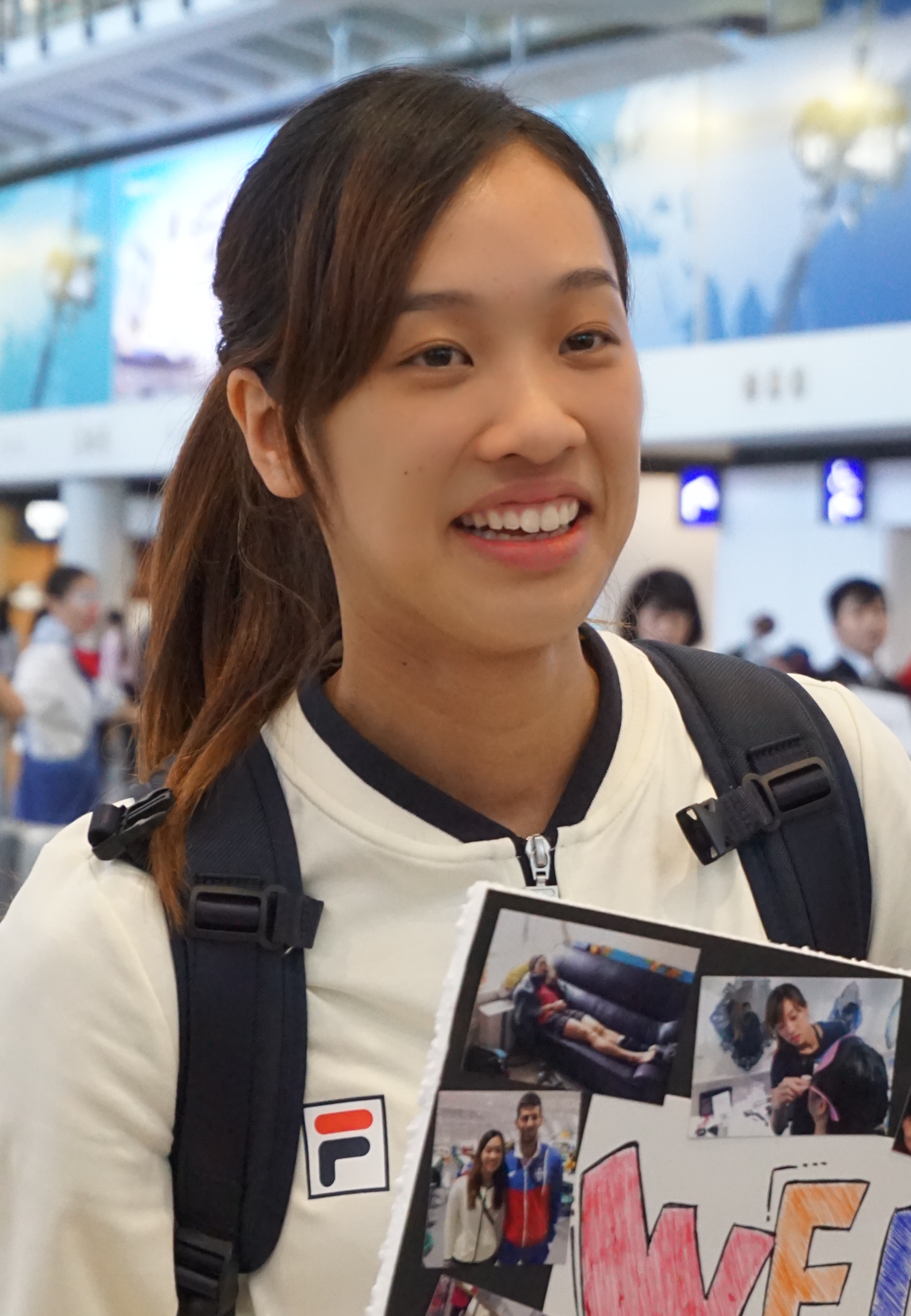
- Poon in 2016

Personal information
- Born: 22 August 1991 (age 35) Hong Kong
- Height: 1.69 m (5 ft 7 in)
- Weight: 61 kg (134 lb)

Sport
- Country: Hong Kong (until 2022); Australia (2022–present)
- Sport: Badminton
- Handedness: Right

Women's singles & doubles
- Highest ranking: 65 (WS 23 February 2012); 9 (WD 7 August 2013); 53 (XD 27 November 2014)
- BWF profile
Medal record
Women's badminton
Representing Hong Kong
East Asian Games
| Bronze medal – third place | 2009 Hong Kong | Women's team |
| Bronze medal – third place | 2013 Tianjin | Women's team |
World Junior Championships
| Bronze medal – third place | 2009 Alor Setar | Girls' doubles |
Asian Junior Championships
| Bronze medal – third place | 2008 Kuala Lumpur | Mixed team |

Poon Lok Yan (Chinese: 潘樂恩; Jyutping: pun^{1} lok^{6} jan^{1}, born 22 August 1991) is a badminton player from Hong Kong, now representing Australia. She competed at the 2012 and 2016 Summer Olympics in women's doubles event.

Together with Tse Ying Suet, she has received her best competitive results in Women's Doubles. Their breakout performance was at the 2011 India Super Series where they reached the semifinals. They matched that result at the 2011 Japan Super Series and qualified for the 2012 London Olympics. At 2012 Japan Super Series, she together with Tse Ying Suet won the champion of women's doubles by beating 4 Japan pairs consecutively.

== Achievements ==
=== BWF World Junior Championships ===
Girls' doubles
| Year | Venue | Partner | Opponent | Score | Result |
|---|---|---|---|---|---|
| 2009 | Stadium Sultan Abdul Halim; Alor Setar, Malaysia | (Hong Kong) Tse Ying Suet | (Indonesia) Suci Rizki Andini (Indonesia) Tiara Rosalia Nuraidah | 21–18, 9–21, 18–21 | Bronze |

=== BWF Superseries ===
The BWF Superseries, launched on 14 December 2006 and implemented in 2007, is a series of elite badminton tournaments, sanctioned by Badminton World Federation (BWF). BWF Superseries has two level such as Superseries and Superseries Premier. A season of Superseries features twelve tournaments around the world, which introduced since 2011, with successful players invited to the BWF Superseries Finals held at the year end.

Women's doubles
| Year | Tournament | Partner | Opponent | Score | Result |
|---|---|---|---|---|---|
| 2012 | Japan Open | (Hong Kong) Tse Ying Suet | (Japan) Shizuka Matsuo (Japan) Mami Naito | 21–17, 22–20 | (gold) Winner |

BWF Super Series Premier tournament
BWF Super Series tournament

=== BWF Grand Prix ===
The BWF Grand Prix has two levels, the Grand Prix and Grand Prix Gold. It is a series of badminton tournaments sanctioned by the Badminton World Federation (BWF) since 2007.

Women's doubles
| Year | Tournament | Partner | Opponent | Score | Result |
|---|---|---|---|---|---|
| 2015 | Bitburger Open | (Hong Kong) Tse Ying Suet | (China) Tang Yuanting (China) Yu Yang | 10–21, 18–21 | (silver) Runner-up |
| 2015 | Macau Open | (Hong Kong) Tse Ying Suet | (South Korea) Jung Kyung-eun (South Korea) Shin Seung-chan | 21–18, 15–15 retired | (silver) Runner-up |
| 2017 | Malaysia Masters | (Hong Kong) Tse Ying Suet | (Thailand) Jongkolphan Kititharakul (Thailand) Rawinda Prajongjai | 17–21, 9–21 | (silver) Runner-up |

BWF Grand Prix Gold tournament
BWF Grand Prix tournament

=== BWF International Challenge/Series (4 runners-up) ===
Women's doubles
| Year | Tournament | Partner | Opponent | Score | Result |
|---|---|---|---|---|---|
| 2011 | New Zealand International | (Hong Kong) Tse Ying Suet | (Japan) Yuriko Miki (Japan) Koharu Yonemoto | 21–16, 16–21, 20–22 | (silver) Runner-up |
| 2013 | Vietnam International | (Hong Kong) Tse Ying Suet | (Thailand) Narissapat Lam (Thailand) Puttita Supajirakul | 18–21, 21–17, 11–21 | (silver) Runner-up |
| 2023 | Sydney International | (Australia) Sylvina Kurniawan | (Australia) Setyana Mapasa (Australia) Angela Yu | 16–21, 18–21 | (silver) Runner-up |

Mixed doubles
| Year | Tournament | Partner | Opponent | Score | Result |
|---|---|---|---|---|---|
| 2014 | Vietnam International | (Hong Kong) Fernando Kurniawan | (Indonesia) Alfian Eko Prasetya (Indonesia) Annisa Saufika | 14–21, 17–21 | (silver) Runner-up |

BWF International Challenge tournament
BWF International Series tournament

== Record against selected opponents ==
Record against year-end Finals finalists, World Championships semi-finalists, and Olympic quarter-finalists.

Tse Ying Suet

| Players | M | W | L | Diff. |
|---|---|---|---|---|
| (Australia) Leanne Choo & Renuga Veeran | 1 | 0 | 1 | –1 |
| (Canada) Alex Bruce & Michelle Li | 1 | 1 | 0 | +1 |
| (China) Chen Qingchen & Jia Yifan | 1 | 0 | 1 | –1 |
| (China) Luo Ying & Luo Yu | 4 | 0 | 4 | –4 |
| (China) Ma Jin & Tang Jinhua | 1 | 0 | 1 | –1 |
| (China) Tang Yuanting & Yu Yang | 1 | 0 | 1 | –1 |
| (China) Tian Qing & Zhao Yunlei | 3 | 0 | 3 | –3 |
| (China) Wang Xiaoli & Yu Yang | 8 | 0 | 8 | –8 |
| (Chinese Taipei) Cheng Wen-hsing & Chien Yu-chin | 4 | 0 | 4 | –4 |
| (Denmark) Christinna Pedersen & Kamilla Rytter Juhl | 7 | 1 | 6 | –5 |
| (India) Jwala Gutta & Ashwini Ponnappa | 3 | 1 | 2 | –1 |
| (Indonesia) Nitya Krishinda Maheswari & Greysia Polii | 1 | 0 | 1 | –1 |
| (Japan) Mizuki Fujii & Reika Kakiiwa | 4 | 0 | 4 | –4 |
| (Japan) Naoko Fukuman & Kurumi Yonao | 6 | 3 | 3 | 0 |
| (Japan) Yuki Fukushima & Sayaka Hirota | 1 | 1 | 0 | +1 |
| (Japan) Reika Kakiiwa & Miyuki Maeda | 2 | 0 | 2 | –2 |
| (Japan) Miyuki Maeda & Satoko Suetsuna | 4 | 2 | 2 | 0 |
| (Japan) Mayu Matsumoto & Wakana Nagahara | 2 | 1 | 1 | 0 |
| (Japan) Misaki Matsutomo & Ayaka Takahashi | 4 | 1 | 3 | –2 |
| (Malaysia) Vivian Hoo Kah Mun & Woon Khe Wei | 4 | 3 | 1 | +2 |
| (Malaysia) Chin Eei Hui & Wong Pei Tty | 3 | 0 | 3 | –3 |
| (Netherlands) Eefje Muskens & Selena Piek | 3 | 2 | 1 | +1 |
| (South Korea) Chang Ye-na & Lee So-hee | 1 | 0 | 1 | –1 |
| (South Korea) Eom Hye-won & Chang Ye-na | 1 | 0 | 1 | –1 |
| (South Korea) Ha Jung-eun & Kim Min-jung | 3 | 1 | 2 | –1 |
| (South Korea) Jung Kyung-eun & Shin Seung-chan | 1 | 0 | 1 | –1 |
| (South Korea) Lee So-hee & Shin Seung-chan | 1 | 1 | 0 | +1 |
