= Kim Min-jung (badminton) =

South Korean badminton player (born 1986)

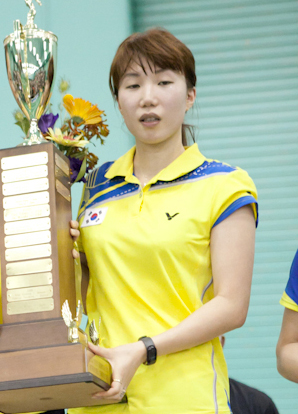

Personal information
- Born: 29 July 1986 (age 40) Jeju, South Korea
- Height: 1.68 m (5 ft 6 in)
- Weight: 63 kg (139 lb)

Sport
- Country: South Korea
- Sport: Badminton
- Handedness: Right

Women's & mixed doubles
- Highest ranking: 2 (WD with Ha Jung-eun); 11 (XD with Yoo Yeon-seong)
- BWF profile
Medal record
Women's badminton
Representing South Korea
World Cup
Bronze medal – third place	2005 Yiyang	Women's doubles
Sudirman Cup
Silver medal – second place	2009 Guangzhou	Mixed team
Bronze medal – third place	2011 Qingdao	Mixed team
Uber Cup
Gold medal – first place	2010 Kuala Lumpur	Women's team
Silver medal – second place	2012 Wuhan	Women's team
Bronze medal – third place	2008 Jakarta	Women's team
Asian Games
Bronze medal – third place	2010 Guangzhou	Women's doubles
Bronze medal – third place	2010 Guangzhou	Women's team
Asian Championships
Silver medal – second place	2009 Suwon	Mixed doubles
Silver medal – second place	2010 New Delhi	Mixed doubles
Bronze medal – third place	2011 Chengdu	Women's doubles
Summer Universiade
Gold medal – first place	2007 Bangkok	Mixed doubles
Asian Junior Championships
Silver medal – second place	2004 Hwacheon	Girls' team
Bronze medal – third place	2004 Hwacheon	Girls' doubles

- Kim Min-jung
- Hangul: 김민정
- Hanja: 金旼貞
- RR: Gim Minjeong
- MR: Kim Minjŏng

Kim Min-jung (born 29 July 1986) is a badminton player representing South Korea. Her name is sometimes spelled Kim Min-jeong. As a badminton player, Kim has focused on doubles with Ha Jung-eun; together they competed at the 2008 Beijing Olympics. In the past she has been paired with Hwang Ji-man and Yoo Yeon-seong in mixed doubles.

== Career ==
At the 2012 Summer Olympics, Kim and her partner Ha Jung-eun, along with Jung Kyung-eun and Kim Ha-na of South Korea, Wang Xiaoli and Yu Yang of China, and Meiliana Jauhari and Greysia Polii of Indonesia were disqualified from the competition for "not using one's best efforts to win a match" and "conducting oneself in a manner that is clearly abusive or detrimental to the sport" following matches the previous evening during which they were accused of trying to lose in order to manipulate the draw. Kim and her partner Ha Jung-eun played against Indonesia's Meiliana Jauhari and Greysia Polii. It is suspected that the Koreans emulated China so to avoid playing against another Korean team in the semi-finals; the Korean head coach Sung Han-kook said "Because they don't want to play the semi-final against each other, so we did the same. We didn't want to play the South Korean team again". South Korea filed an appeal to the case, but it was rejected by the Badminton World Federation.

== Achievements ==
=== World Cup ===
Women's doubles
Year	Venue	Partner	Opponent	Score	Result
2005	Olympic Park, Yiyang, China	(South Korea) Ha Jung-eun	(China) Wei Yili (China) Zhang Yawen	11–21, 13–21	Bronze

=== Asian Games ===
Women's doubles
Year	Venue	Partner	Opponent	Score	Result
2010	Tianhe Gymnasium, Guangzhou, China	(South Korea) Lee Hyo-jung	(China) Tian Qing (China) Zhao Yunlei	9–21, 12–21	Bronze

=== Asian Championships ===
Women's doubles
Year	Venue	Partner	Opponent	Score	Result
2011	Sichuan Gymnasium, Chengdu, China	(South Korea) Ha Jung-eun	(China) Tian Qing (China) Zhao Yunlei	15–21, 21–19, 17–21	Bronze

Mixed doubles
Year	Venue	Partner	Opponent	Score	Result
2009	Suwon Indoor Stadium, Suwon, South Korea	(South Korea) Yoo Yeon-seong	(South Korea) Lee Yong-dae (South Korea) Lee Hyo-jung	12–21, 15–21	Silver
2010	Siri Fort Indoor Stadium, New Delhi, India	(South Korea) Yoo Yeon-seong	(Malaysia) Chan Peng Soon (Malaysia) Goh Liu Ying	17–21, 22–20, 19–21	Silver

=== Summer Universiade ===
Mixed doubles
Year	Venue	Partner	Opponent	Score	Result
2007	Thammasat University, Pathum Thani, Thailand	(South Korea) Yoo Yeon-seong	(Chinese Taipei) Fang Chieh-min (Chinese Taipei) Cheng Wen-hsing	21–19, 13–21, 21–17	Gold

=== Asian Junior Championships ===
Girls' doubles
Year	Venue	Partner	Opponent	Score	Result
2004	Hwacheon Indoor Stadium, Hwacheon, South Korea	(South Korea) Ahn Jung-ha	(China) Feng Chen (China) Pan Pan	9–15, 11–15	Bronze

=== BWF Superseries ===
The BWF Superseries, launched on 14 December 2006 and implemented in 2007, is a series of elite badminton tournaments, sanctioned by Badminton World Federation (BWF). BWF Superseries has two level such as Superseries and Superseries Premier. A season of Superseries features twelve tournaments around the world, which introduced since 2011, with successful players invited to the Superseries Finals held at the year end.

Women's doubles
Year	Tournament	Partner	Opponent	Score	Result
2010	Singapore Open	(South Korea) Lee Hyo-jung	(Singapore) Shinta Mulia Sari (Singapore) Yao Lei	17–21, 20–22	(silver) Runner-up
2010	Indonesia Open	(South Korea) Lee Hyo-jung	(Chinese Taipei) Cheng Wen-hsing (Chinese Taipei) Chien Yu-chin	21–12, 12–21, 21–11	(gold) Winner
2011	Singapore Open	(South Korea) Ha Jung-eun	(China) Tian Qing (China) Zhao Yunlei	13–21, 16–21	(silver) Runner-up
2011	World Superseries Finals	(South Korea) Ha Jung-eun	(China) Wang Xiaoli (China) Yu Yang	8–21, 12–21	(silver) Runner-up
2012	Korea Open	(South Korea) Ha Jung-eun	(China) Tian Qing (China) Zhao Yunlei	18–21, 13–21	(silver) Runner-up
2012	Malaysia Open	(South Korea) Ha Jung-eun	(Denmark) Christinna Pedersen (Denmark) Kamilla Rytter Juhl	19–21, 18–21	(silver) Runner-up

BWF Super Series Finals tournament
BWF Super Series Premier tournament
BWF Super Series tournament

=== BWF Grand Prix ===
The BWF Grand Prix has two levels, the Grand Prix Gold and Grand Prix. It is a series of badminton tournaments, sanctioned by the Badminton World Federation (BWF) since 2007.

Women's doubles
Year	Tournament	Partner	Opponent	Score	Result
2010	Chinese Taipei Open	(South Korea) Lee Hyo-jung	(South Korea) Yoo Hyun-young (South Korea) Lee Kyung-won	21–14, 22–20	(gold) Winner
2011	German Open	(South Korea) Ha Jung-eun	(Japan) Mizuki Fujii (Japan) Reika Kakiiwa	6–21, 14–21	(silver) Runner-up
2011	Swiss Open	(South Korea) Ha Jung-eun	(South Korea) Jung Kyung-eun (South Korea) Kim Ha-na	21–12, 21–13	(gold) Winner
2011	U.S. Open	(South Korea) Ha Jung-eun	(South Korea) Jung Kyung-eun (South Korea) Kim Ha-na	14–21, 22–20, 21–18	(gold) Winner
2011	Chinese Taipei Open	(South Korea) Ha Jung-eun	(Indonesia) Meiliana Jauhari (Indonesia) Greysia Polii	17–21, 21–18, 2–0 retired	(gold) Winner

Mixed doubles
Year	Tournament	Partner	Opponent	Score	Result
2010	Korea Grand Prix	(South Korea) Yoo Yeon-seong	(South Korea) Choi Young-woo (South Korea) Eom Hye-won	21–15, 21–13	(gold) Winner

BWF Grand Prix Gold tournament
BWF Grand Prix tournament

=== BWF International Challenge/Series/Satellite ===
Women's doubles
Year	Tournament	Partner	Opponent	Score	Result
2005	Vietnam Satellite	(South Korea) Kang Hae-won	(South Korea) Ha Jung-eun (South Korea) Oh Seul-ki	6–15, 15–7, 5–15	(silver) Runner-up
2005	Surabaya Satellite	(South Korea) Ha Jung-eun	(Indonesia) Nitya Krishinda Maheswari (Indonesia) Nadya Melati	15–13, 15–0	(gold) Winner
2005	Cheers Asian Satellite	(South Korea) Ha Jung-eun	(Singapore) Jiang Yanmei (Singapore) Li Yujia	3–15, 1–15	(silver) Runner-up
2006	Vietnam Satellite	(South Korea) Oh Seul-ki	(Thailand) Duanganong Aroonkesorn (Thailand) Kunchala Voravichitchaikul	23–21, 12–21, 21–9	(gold) Winner
2006	Mongolian Satellite	(South Korea) Sun In-jang	(South Korea) Jung Kyung-eun (South Korea) Yoo Hyun-young	21–15, 21–18	(gold) Winner
2006	India Satellite	(South Korea) Jung Youn-kyung	(India) Jwala Gutta (India) Shruti Kurien	21–18, 21–19	(gold) Winner
2006	Malaysia Satellite	(South Korea) Jung Youn-kyung	(South Korea) Jung Kyung-eun (South Korea) Yoo Hyun-young	21–14, 21–17	(gold) Winner
2007	Vietnam International	(South Korea) Ha Jung-eun	(Indonesia) Richi Puspita Dili (Indonesia) Yulianti	17–21, 21–9, 16–21	(silver) Runner-up
2007	Cheers Asian Satellite	(South Korea) Ha Jung-eun	(Indonesia) Richi Puspita Dili (Indonesia) Yulianti	21–18, 21–12	(gold) Winner
2008	Osaka International	(South Korea) Ha Jung-eun	(Japan) Kumiko Ogura (Japan) Reiko Shiota	22–20, 8–21, 13–21	(silver) Runner-up
2008	Korea International	(South Korea) Ha Jung-eun	(South Korea) Jang Ye-na (South Korea) Kim Mi-young	21–15, 21–14	(gold) Winner

Mixed doubles
Year	Tournament	Partner	Opponent	Score	Result
2005	Thailand Satellite	(South Korea) Han Sang-hoon	(Thailand) Songphon Anugritayawon (Thailand) Kunchala Voravichitchaikul	12–15, 8–15	(silver) Runner-up
2006	Mongolian Satellite	(South Korea) Yoo Yeon-seong	(South Korea) Lee Jung-hwan (South Korea) Yoo Hyun-young	21–13, 21–15	(gold) Winner
2006	Malaysia Satellite	(South Korea) Shin Baek-cheol	(Indonesia) Tontowi Ahmad (Indonesia) Yulianti	21–16, 21–14	(gold) Winner
2007	Cheers Asian Satellite	(South Korea) Cho Gun-woo	(South Korea) Yoo Yeon-seong (South Korea) Ha Jung-eun	21–19, 21–15	(gold) Winner
2007	Indonesia International	(South Korea) Yoo Yeon-seong	(Indonesia) Tontowi Ahmad (Indonesia) Yulianti	16–21, 21–15, 9–21	(silver) Runner-up

BWF International Challenge tournament
BWF International Series tournament

== Record against selected opponents ==
Women's doubles results with Ha Jung-eun against Super Series finalists, Worlds semifinalists, and Olympic quarterfinalists.

- (Australia) Leanne Choo & Renuga Veeran 2–0
- (Bulgaria) / (Russia) Petya Nedelcheva & Anastasia Russkikh 1–0
- (Canada) Alex Bruce & Michelle Li 1–0
- (China) Du Jing & Yu Yang (badminton) 0–3
- (China) Cheng Shu & Zhao Yunlei 0–4
- (China) Gao Ling & Huang Sui 0–1
- (China) Ma Jin & Wang Xiaoli 0–2
- (China) Tang Jinhua & Xia Huan 0–1
- (China) Tian Qing & Zhao Yunlei 0–4
- (China) Wang Xiaoli & Yu Yang 1–7
- (China) Zhang Yawen & Wei Yili 0–3
- (China) Yang Wei & Zhang Jiewen 0–2
- (Chinese Taipei) Cheng Wen-hsing & Chien Yu-chin 3–3
- (Denmark) Christinna Pedersen & Kamilla Rytter Juhl 4–1
- (Hong Kong) Poon Lok Yan & Tse Ying Suet 2–1
- (India) Jwala Gutta & Ashwini Ponnappa 3–0
- (Indonesia) Vita Marissa & Nadya Melati 1–0
- (Indonesia) Meiliana Jauhari & Greysia Polii 3–1
- (Japan) Mizuki Fujii & Reika Kakiiwa 3–3
- (Japan) Miyuki Maeda & Satoko Suetsuna 3–1
- (Japan) Kumiko Ogura & Reiko Shiota 1–2
- (Japan) Shizuka Matsuo & Mami Naito 6–0
- (Japan) Misaki Matsutomo & Ayaka Takahashi 3–0
- (South Korea) Lee Hyo-jung & Lee Kyung-won 0–2
- (South Korea) Jung Kyung-eun & Kim Ha-na 3–1
- (Malaysia) Chin Eei Hui & Wong Pei Tty 3–1
- (Russia) Valeria Sorokina & Nina Vislova 1–0
- (Singapore) Jiang Yanmei & Li Yujia 1–2
- (Singapore) Shinta Mulia Sari & Yao Lei 6–1
- (South Africa) Michelle Edwards & Annari Viljoen 1–0
- (Thailand) Duanganong Aroonkesorn & Kunchala Voravichitchaikul 1–1
