= Chien Yu-chin =

Taiwanese badminton player

Chien Yu-chin 簡毓瑾
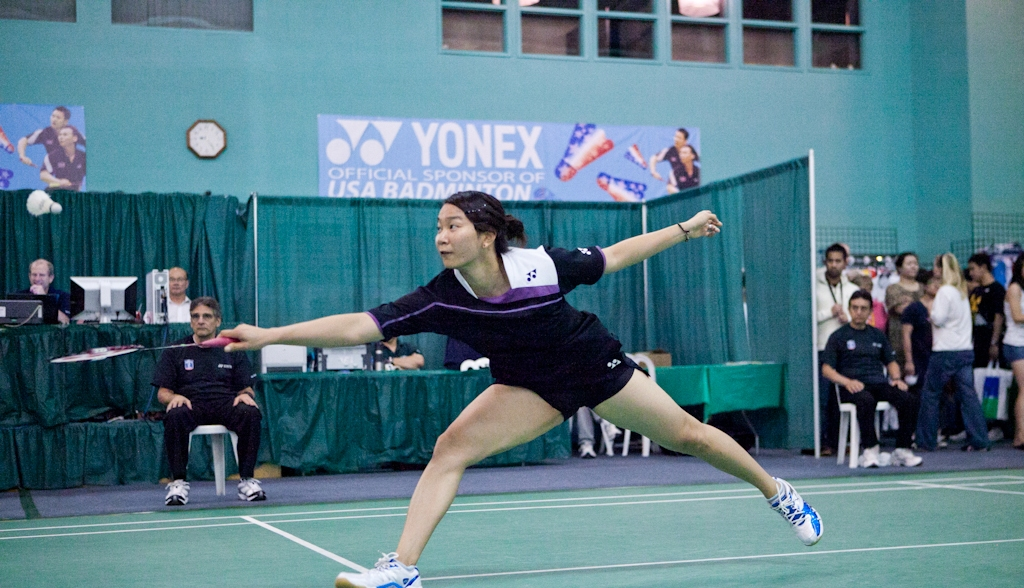

Personal information
- Born: 24 October 1982 (age 44) Kaohsiung, Taiwan
- Height: 1.74 m (5 ft 9 in)
- Weight: 72 kg (159 lb)

Sport
- Country: Republic of China (Taiwan)
- Sport: Badminton
- Handedness: Right

Women's & mixed doubles
- Highest ranking: 1 (WD with Cheng Wen-hsing 1 October 2010); 6 (XD with Lee Sheng-mu 17 December 2010)
Medal record
Women's badminton
Representing Chinese Taipei
World Championships
Bronze medal – third place	2010 Paris	Women's doubles
Bronze medal – third place	2010 Paris	Mixed doubles
World Cup
Bronze medal – third place	2006 Yiyang	Women's doubles
Uber Cup
Bronze medal – third place	2006 Sendai–Tokyo	Women's team
Asian Championships
Silver medal – second place	2006 Johor Bahru	Women's doubles
Silver medal – second place	2008 Johor Bahru	Women's doubles
Bronze medal – third place	2009 Suwon	Women's doubles
Bronze medal – third place	2010 New Delhi	Women's doubles
East Asian Games
Silver medal – second place	2009 Hong Kong	Women's team
Bronze medal – third place	2009 Hong Kong	Women's doubles
Summer Universiade
Gold medal – first place	2007 Bangkok	Women's doubles
Bronze medal – third place	2007 Bangkok	Mixed team
World Junior Championships
Bronze medal – third place	2000 Guangzhou	Girls' singles
Asian Junior Championships
Bronze medal – third place	1999 Yangon	Girls' team
Bronze medal – third place	2000 Kyoto	Girls' team

Chien Yu-chin (traditional Chinese: 簡毓瑾; simplified Chinese: 简毓瑾; pinyin: Jiǎn Yùjǐn; Wade–Giles: Chien Yü-chin; born 24 October 1982) is a Taiwanese former badminton player.

== Summer Olympics ==
Chien competed for Chinese Taipei in the 2004 Olympics in the women's doubles with partner Cheng Wen-hsing. They defeated Helen Nichol and Charmaine Reid of Canada in the first round but were defeated by Hwang Yu-mi and Lee Hyo-jung of South Korea in the round of 16. At the 2008 Summer Olympics, again with Cheng, they lost to Wei Yili and Zhang Yawen of China in the quarter-finals. At the 2012 Summer Olympics, she teamed up with Cheng again, but they lost to Tian Qing and Zhao Yunlei, the eventual winners, in the quarterfinal.

== Achievements ==
=== BWF World Championships ===
Women's doubles
Year	Venue	Partner	Opponent	Score	Result
2010	Stade Pierre de Coubertin, Paris, France	(Chinese Taipei) Cheng Wen-hsing	(China) Du Jing (China) Yu Yang	16–21, 15–21	Bronze

Mixed doubles
Year	Venue	Partner	Opponent	Score	Result
2010	Stade Pierre de Coubertin, Paris, France	(Chinese Taipei) Lee Sheng-mu	(China) He Hanbin (China) Yu Yang	13–21, 8–21	Bronze

=== World Cup ===
Women's doubles
Year	Venue	Partner	Opponent	Score	Result
2006	Olympic Park, Yiyang, China	(Chinese Taipei) Cheng Wen-hsing	(China) Gao Ling (China) Huang Sui	19–21, 13–21	Bronze

=== Asian Championships ===
Women's doubles
Year	Venue	Partner	Opponent	Score	Result
2006	Bandaraya Stadium, Johor Bahru, Malaysia	(Chinese Taipei) Cheng Wen-hsing	(China) Du Jing (China) Yu Yang	11–21, 16–21	Silver
2008	Bandaraya Stadium, Johor Bahru, Malaysia	(Chinese Taipei) Cheng Wen-hsing	(China) Yang Wei (China) Zhang Jiewen	20–22, 16–21	Silver
2009	Suwon Indoor Stadium, Suwon, South Korea	(Chinese Taipei) Cheng Wen-hsing	(South Korea) Lee Hyo-jung (South Korea) Lee Kyung-won	19–21, 18–21	Bronze
2010	Siri Fort Indoor Stadium, New Delhi, India	(Chinese Taipei) Cheng Wen-hsing	(China) Pan Pan (China) Tian Qing	24–22, 16–21, 18–21	Bronze

=== East Asian Games ===
Women's doubles
Year	Venue	Partner	Opponent	Score	Result
2009	Queen Elizabeth Stadium, Hong Kong	(Chinese Taipei) Wang Pei-rong	(China) Ma Jin (China) Wang Xiaoli	24–22, 15–21, 18–21	Bronze

=== Summer Universiade ===
Women's doubles
Year	Venue	Partner	Opponent	Score	Result
2007	Thammasat University, Pathum Thani, Thailand	(Chinese Taipei) Cheng Wen-hsing	(China) Pan Pan (China) Tian Qing	21–9, 21–13	Gold

=== World Junior Championships ===
Girls' singles
Year	Venue	Opponent	Score	Result
2000	Tianhe Gymnasium, Guangzhou, China	(China) Wang Rong	3–7, 0–7, 0–7	Bronze

=== BWF Superseries ===
The BWF Superseries, which was launched on 14 December 2006 and implemented in 2007, is a series of elite badminton tournaments, sanctioned by the Badminton World Federation (BWF). BWF Superseries levels are Superseries and Superseries Premier. A season of Superseries consists of twelve tournaments around the world that have been introduced since 2011. Successful players are invited to the Superseries Finals, which are held at the end of each year.

Women's doubles
Year	Tournament	Partner	Opponent	Score	Result
2008	Singapore Open	(Chinese Taipei) Cheng Wen-hsing	(China) Du Jing (China) Yu Yang	16–21, 19–21	(silver) Runner-up
2009	Korea Open	(Chinese Taipei) Cheng Wen-hsing	(South Korea) Lee Hyo-jung (South Korea) Lee Kyung-won	21–19, 21–8	(gold) Winner
2010	Indonesia Open	(Chinese Taipei) Cheng Wen-hsing	(South Korea) Kim Min-jung (South Korea) Lee Hyo-jung	12–21, 21–12, 11–21	(silver) Runner-up
2010	Hong Kong Open	(Chinese Taipei) Cheng Wen-hsing	(China) Wang Xiaoli (China) Yu Yang	11–21, 12–21	(silver) Runner-up
2011	Japan Open	(Chinese Taipei) Cheng Wen-hsing	(China) Bao Yixin (China) Zhong Qianxin	21–13, 23–25, 12–21	(silver) Runner-up
2012	Singapore Open	(Chinese Taipei) Cheng Wen-hsing	(China) Bao Yixin (China) Zhong Qianxin	12–21, 17–21	(silver) Runner-up

BWF Super Series Finals tournament
BWF Super Series Premier tournament
BWF Super Series tournament

=== BWF Grand Prix ===
The BWF Grand Prix had two levels, the BWF Grand Prix and Grand Prix Gold. It was a series of badminton tournaments sanctioned by the Badminton World Federation (BWF) which was held from 2007 to 2017. The World Badminton Grand Prix sanctioned by International Badminton Federation (IBF) from 1983 to 2006.

Women's doubles
Year	Tournament	Partner	Opponent	Score	Result
2004	U.S. Open	(Chinese Taipei) Cheng Wen-hsing	(Chinese Taipei) Chou Chia-chi (Chinese Taipei) Ku Pei-ting	15–12, 15–2	(gold) Winner
2004	Chinese Taipei Open	(Chinese Taipei) Cheng Wen-hsing	(Indonesia) Jo Novita (Indonesia) Lita Nurlita	15–4, 15–6	(gold) Winner
2005	Swiss Open	(Chinese Taipei) Cheng Wen-hsing	(South Korea) Lee Hyo-jung (South Korea) Lee Kyung-won	8–15, 12–15	(silver) Runner-up
2005	Chinese Taipei Open	(Chinese Taipei) Cheng Wen-hsing	(Australia) Kellie Lucas (Australia) Kate Wilson-Smith	15–8, 17–14	(gold) Winner
2007	Philippines Open	(Chinese Taipei) Cheng Wen-hsing	(China) Pan Pan (China) Tian Qing	22–20, 21–14	(gold) Winner
2007	Chinese Taipei Open	(Chinese Taipei) Cheng Wen-hsing	(Indonesia) Vita Marissa (Indonesia) Liliyana Natsir	21–15, 17–21, 21–18	(gold) Winner
2007	Russian Open	(Chinese Taipei) Cheng Wen-hsing	(China) Du Jing (China) Yu Yang	14–21, 14–21	(silver) Runner-up
2008	India Open	(Chinese Taipei) Cheng Wen-hsing	(Japan) Miyuki Maeda (Japan) Satoko Suetsuna	21–17, 21–16	(gold) Winner
2008	Chinese Taipei Open	(Chinese Taipei) Cheng Wen-hsing	(Indonesia) Rani Mundiasti (Indonesia) Jo Novita	21–16, 21–17	(gold) Winner
2008	New Zealand Open	(Chinese Taipei) Chou Chia-chi	(Malaysia) Haw Chiou Hwee (Malaysia) Lim Pek Siah	21–8, 21–15	(gold) Winner
2010	Canada Open	(Chinese Taipei) Cheng Wen-hsing	(Germany) Sandra Marinello (Germany) Birgit Overzier	21–16, 18–21, 21–17	(gold) Winner
2010	U.S. Open	(Chinese Taipei) Cheng Wen-hsing	(Japan) Rie Eto (Japan) Yu Wakita	21–8, 22–20	(gold) Winner
2010	Macau Open	(Chinese Taipei) Cheng Wen-hsing	(Indonesia) Meiliana Jauhari (Indonesia) Greysia Polii	16–21, 21–18, 21–16	(gold) Winner
2011	Canada Open	(Chinese Taipei) Cheng Wen-hsing	(China) Bao Yixin (China) Cheng Shu	13–21, 21–23	(silver) Runner-up
2012	Australian Open	(Chinese Taipei) Cheng Wen-hsing	(China) Luo Ying (China) Luo Yu	21–12, 18–21, 17–21	(silver) Runner-up

Mixed doubles
Year	Tournament	Partner	Opponent	Score	Result
2008	New Zealand Open	(Chinese Taipei) Hsieh Yu-hsin	(Chinese Taipei) Chen Hung-ling (Chinese Taipei) Chou Chia-chi	18–21, 20–22	(silver) Runner-up
2010	Canada Open	(Chinese Taipei) Lee Sheng-mu	(Chinese Taipei) Chen Hung-ling (Chinese Taipei) Cheng Wen-hsing	21–16, 11–21, 21–15	(gold) Winner
2010	U.S. Open	(Chinese Taipei) Lee Sheng-mu	(Germany) Michael Fuchs (Germany) Birgit Overzier	19–21, 14–21	(silver) Runner-up
2011	Thailand Open	(Chinese Taipei) Lee Sheng-mu	(Indonesia) Nova Widianto (Indonesia) Vita Marissa	21–10, 23–21	(gold) Winner

BWF Grand Prix Gold tournament
BWF Grand Prix tournament

=== BWF International Challenge/Series/Satellite ===
Women's singles
Year	Tournament	Opponent	Score	Result
2000	Vietnam Satellite	(Chinese Taipei) Lin Chiu-yin	11–4, 11–9, 11–2	(gold) Winner

Women's doubles
Year	Tournament	Partner	Opponent	Score	Result
2000	Vietnam Satellite	(Chinese Taipei) Lin Chiu-yin	(Chinese Taipei) Chen Yueh-ying (Chinese Taipei) Tsai Chia-chun	9–15, 14–17	(silver) Runner-up

Mixed doubles
Year	Tournament	Partner	Opponent	Score	Result
2009	Osaka International	(Chinese Taipei) Hsieh Yu-hsing	(Japan) Noriyasu Hirata (Japan) Shizuka Matsuo	21–18, 21–15	(gold) Winner

BWF International Challenge tournament
BWF International Series tournament

== Record against selected opponents ==
Mixed doubles results with Lee Sheng-mu against Super Series finalists, World's semi-finalists, and Olympic quarterfinalists:

- (China) He Hanbin & Yu Yang 0–1
- (China) He Hanbin & Ma Jin 0–1
- (China) Xu Chen & Ma Jin 1–1
- (China) Tao Jiaming & Tian Qing 0–1
- (China) Zhang Nan & Zhao Yunlei 0–3
- (China) Zheng Bo & Ma Jin 0–1
- (Chinese Taipei) Chen Hung-ling & Cheng Wen-hsing 1–1
- (Denmark) Joachim Fischer Nielsen & Christinna Pedersen 0–3
- (Germany) Michael Fuchs & Birgit Michels 0–2
- (Indonesia) Tontowi Ahmad & Liliyana Natsir 0–1
- (Indonesia) Fran Kurniawan & Pia Zebadiah Bernadet 1–1
- (South Korea) Ko Sung-hyun & Ha Jung-eun 0–2
- (South Korea) Lee Yong-dae & Lee Hyo-jung 1–0
- (Malaysia) Chan Peng Soon & Goh Liu Ying 0–1
- (Poland) Robert Mateusiak & Nadieżda Zięba 1–1
- (Thailand) Sudket Prapakamol & Saralee Thungthongkam 0–2
