= 2009 Indonesia Super Series =

Badminton championships

Tournament details
- Dates: 16–21 June
- Edition: 28th
- Venue: Istora Gelora Bung Karno
- Location: Jakarta, Indonesia

Champions
- Men's singles: (Malaysia) Lee Chong Wei
- Women's singles: (India) Saina Nehwal
- Men's doubles: (South Korea) Jung Jae-sung (South Korea) Lee Yong-dae
- Women's doubles: (Malaysia) Chin Eei Hui (Malaysia) Wong Pei Tty
- Mixed doubles: (China) Zheng Bo (China) Ma Jin

The 2009 Indonesia Open Superseries was the sixth tournament of 2009 BWF Superseries badminton tournament. It was held from 16 to 21 June 2009 in Jakarta, Indonesia. Bolded names below indicate champions.

== Men's singles ==
=== Seeds ===
1. **(Malaysia) Lee Chong Wei (champion)**
2. (Denmark) Peter Gade (second round)
3. (China) Lin Dan (quarter-finals)
4. (Indonesia) Sony Dwi Kuncoro (semi-finals)
5. (Indonesia) Taufik Hidayat (final)
6. (China) Chen Jin (semi-finals)
7. (Denmark) Joachim Persson (second round)
8. (Indonesia) Simon Santoso (second round)

=== Finals ===
Semi-finals
1	**(Malaysia) Lee Chong Wei**	**21**	**22**
6	(China) Chen Jin	15	20
4	(Indonesia) Sony Dwi Kuncoro	17	14
5	**(Indonesia) Taufik Hidayat**	**21**	**21**

Final
1	**(Malaysia) Lee Chong Wei**	**21**	**21**
5	(Indonesia) Taufik Hidayat	9	14

=== Top half ===
==== Section 1 ====
First Round
1	**(Malaysia) Lee C W**	**21**	**21**
(Germany) M Zwiebler	17	13
Q1	(Denmark) H-K Vittinghus	15	**22**	16
**(Malaysia) M H Hashim**	**21**	20	**21**
8	**(Indonesia) S Santoso**	16	**21**	**21**
(Denmark) J Ø. Jørgensen	**21**	8	19
PFQ	(China) Lü Y	17	16
**(South Korea) Park S-h**	**21**	**21**

Second Round
1	**(Malaysia) Lee C W**	**21**	19	**21**
(Malaysia) M H Hashim	7	**21**	7
8	(Indonesia) S Santoso	16	17
**(South Korea) Park S-h**	**21**	**21**

Quarter-finals
1	**(Malaysia) Lee C W**	**21**	**21**
(South Korea) Park S-h	9	13

==== Section 2 ====
First Round
3	**(China) Lin D**	**21**	**22**
(Indonesia) A K Tedjono	13	20
(India) A Bhat	20	12
**(Chinese Taipei) Hsieh Y-h**	**22**	**21**
6	**(China) Chen J**	**21**	**21**
Q4	(Malaysia) Kuan B H	11	11
**(Netherlands) D Palyama**	**21**	**21**
(England) R Ouseph	14	18

Second Round
3	**(China) Lin D**	**21**	**21**
(Chinese Taipei) Hsieh Y-h	12	12
6	**(China) Chen J**	**23**	**22**
(Netherlands) D Palyama	21	20

Quarter-finals
3	(China) Lin D	**21**	17	4
6	**(China) Chen J**	18	**21**	**21**

=== Bottom half ===
==== Section 3 ====
First Round
**(Hong Kong) Chan Y K**	**21**	**21**
(Hong Kong) Ng W	8	9
(India) C Anand	19	16
7	**(Denmark) J Persson**	**21**	**21**
Q2	(Thailand) T Saensomboonsuk	17	14
**(Malaysia) Wong C H**	**21**	**21**
Q3	(India) A Pawar	15	**21**	18
4	**(Indonesia) S D Kuncoro**	**21**	13	**21**

Second Round
**(Hong Kong) Chan Y K**	**24**	**21**
7	(Denmark) J Persson	22	13
(Malaysia) Wong C H	8	12
4	**(Indonesia) S D Kuncoro**	**21**	**21**

Quarter-finals
(Hong Kong) Chan Y K	**21**	17	10
4	**(Indonesia) S D Kuncoro**	18	**21**	**21**

==== Section 4 ====
First Round
(Netherlands) E Pang	10	15
**(Thailand) B Ponsana**	**21**	**21**
(England) A Smith	10	15
5	**(Indonesia) T Hidayat**	**21**	**21**
(Poland) P Wacha	18	14
**(Vietnam) Nguyễn T M**	**21**	**21**
(India) P Kashyap	18	12
2	**(Denmark) P Gade**	**21**	**21**

Second Round
(Thailand) B Ponsana	17	**21**	10
5	**(Indonesia) T Hidayat**	**21**	19	**21**
(Vietnam) Nguyễn T M	**21**	19	14
2	**(Denmark) P Gade**	13	**21**	**21**

Quarter-finals
5	**(Indonesia) T Hidayat**	**21**	8	**22**
2	(Denmark) P Gade	19	**21**	20

== Women's singles ==
=== Seeds ===
1. (Hong Kong) Zhou Mi (first round)
2. (China) Wang Yihan (quarter-finals)
3. (China) Wang Lin (final)
4. (Hong Kong) Wang Chen (second round)
5. (France) Pi Hongyan (first round)
6. **(India) Saina Nehwal (champions)**
7. (China) Lu Lan (semi-finals)
8. (China) Xie Xingfang (semi-finals)

=== Finals ===
Semi-finals
8	(China) Xie Xingfang	19	13
3	**(China) Wang Lin**	**21**	**21**
6	**(India) Saina Nehwal**	**25**	**21**
7	(China) Lu Lan	23	19

Final
3	(China) Wang Lin	**21**	18	9
6	**(India) Saina Nehwal**	12	**21**	**21**

=== Top half ===
==== Section 1 ====
First Round
1	(Hong Kong) Zhou M	11	**21**	19
Q2	**(Japan) S Sato**	**21**	16	**21**
(Malaysia) Wong M C	18	17
Q3	**(South Korea) Kim M-h**	**21**	**21**
8	**(China) Xie XF**	**21**	**23**
(Indonesia) M K Yulianti	17	21
**(Netherlands) R Van Cutsen**	**21**	**21**
Q1	(Indonesia) R A Pradipta	16	18

Second Round
Q2	**(Japan) S Sato**	**21**	**21**
Q3	(South Korea) Kim M-h	15	18
8	**(China) Xie XF**	**21**	**21**
(Netherlands) R Van Cutsen	6	15

Quarter-finals
Q2	(Japan) S Sato	20	13
8	**(China) Xie XF**	**22**	**21**

==== Section 2 ====
First Round
3	**(China) Wang Lin**	**21**	**21**
(Thailand) S Ponsana	15	17
**(Indonesia) A Firdasari**	**21**	**21**
(Netherlands) Yao J	14	16
5	(France) Pi HY	22	**21**	15
**(Indonesia) M F Kusumastuti**	**24**	6	**21**
(Germany) N Grether	19	**21**	7
**(India) A Mutatkar**	**21**	19	**21**

Second Round
3	**(China) Wang Lin**	**21**
(Indonesia) A Firdasari	13^{r}
**(Indonesia) M F Kusumastuti**	**21**	**21**
(India) A Mutatkar	8	5

Quarter-finals
3	**(China) Wang Lin**	**21**	**21**
(Indonesia) M F Kusumastuti	11	10

=== Bottom half ===
==== Section 3 ====
First Round
(Hong Kong) Yip P Y	14	16
**(Germany) J Schenk**	**21**	**21**
(Bulgaria) P Nedelcheva	18	12
6	**(India) S Nehwal**	**21**	**21**
(Canada) C Reid	12	7
**(South Korea) Hwang H-y**	**21**	**21**
(Indonesia) M E Christina	12	15
4	**(Hong Kong) Wang C**	**21**	**21**

Second Round
(Germany) J Schenk	**21**	7	19
6	**(India) S Nehwal**	18	**21**	**21**
**(South Korea) Hwang H-y**	**21**	14	**21**
4	(Hong Kong) Wang C	19	**21**	14

Quarter-finals
6	**(India) S Nehwal**	**21**	13	**21**
(South Korea) Hwang H-y	7	**21**	15

==== Section 4 ====
First Round
**(China) Zhu L**	**21**	**21**
Q4	(Singapore) Fu M T	12	13
PFQ	(Slovenia) M Tvrdy	12	15
7	**(China) Lu L**	**21**	**21**
(Singapore) Xing A Y	13	16
**(Thailand) P Buranaprasertsuk**	**21**	**21**
(Netherlands) J Meulendijks	14	15
2	**(China) Wang YH**	**21**	**21**

Second Round
(China) Zhu L	13	11
7	**(China) Lu L**	**21**	**21**
(Thailand) P Buranaprasertsuk	16	5
2	**(China) Wang YH**	**21**	**21**

Quarter-finals
7	**(China) Lu L**	**21**	11	**22**
2	(China) Wang YH	10	**21**	20

== Men's doubles ==
=== Seeds ===
1. (Indonesia) Markis Kido / Hendra Setiawan (semi-finals)
2. (Denmark) Mathias Boe / Carsten Mogensen (withdrew)
3. (Malaysia) Koo Kien Keat / Tan Boon Heong (semi-finals)
4. (Malaysia) Mohd Zakry Abdul Latif / Mohd Fairuzizuan Mohd Tazari (quarter-finals)
5. (China) Fu Haifeng / Cai Yun (final)
6. (South Korea) **Jung Jae Sung / Lee Yong-dae (champions)**
7. (Indonesia) Mohammad Ahsan / Bona Septano (first round)
8. (Malaysia) Choong Tan Fook / Lee Wan Wah (first round)

=== Finals ===
Semi-finals
1	(Indonesia) Markis Kido (Indonesia) Hendra Setiawan	19	17
6	**(South Korea) Jung Jae Sung** **(South Korea) Lee Yong-dae**	**21**	**21**
3	(Malaysia) Koo Kien Keat (Malaysia) Tan Boon Heong	**21**	11	15
5	**(China) Fu Haifeng** **(China) Cai Yun**	18	**21**	**22**

Final
6	**(South Korea) Jung Jae Sung** **(South Korea) Lee Yong-dae**	**21**	**21**
5	(China) Fu Haifeng (China) Cai Yun	15	18

=== Top half ===
==== Section 1 ====
First Round
1	**(Indonesia) M Kido** **(Indonesia) H Setiawan**	**21**	**21**
(Germany) M Fuchs (Germany) I Kindervater	10	14
**(Singapore) H K Saputra** **(Singapore) H Wijaya**	**21**	16	**21**
(Indonesia) W Windarto (Indonesia) A Y Wirawan	14	**21**	13
8	(Malaysia) Choong T F (Malaysia) Lee W W	**21**	18	17
**(Indonesia) H A Gunawan** **(Indonesia) A Yulianto**	16	**21**	**21**
(South Korea) Ko S-h (South Korea) Yoo Y-s	**28**	16	19
**(South Korea) Hwang J-m** **(South Korea) Shin B-c**	26	**21**	**21**

Second Round
1	**(Indonesia) M Kido** **(Indonesia) H Setiawan**	**21**	18	**21**
(Singapore) H K Saputra (Singapore) H Wijaya	11	**21**	18
**(Indonesia) H A Gunawan** **(Indonesia) A Yulianto**	20	**21**	**21**
(South Korea) Hwang J-m (South Korea) Shin B-c	**22**	17	11

Quarter-finals
1	**(Indonesia) M Kido** **(Indonesia) H Setiawan**	**21**	**21**
(Indonesia) H A Gunawan (Indonesia) A Yulianto	19	11

==== Section 2 ====
First Round
4	**(Malaysia) M Zakry A L** **(Malaysia) M Fairuzizuan M T**	**21**	**21**
Q3	(South Korea) Kim G-j (South Korea) Kwon Y-g	8	17
(England) C Adcock (England) R Blair	17	22
**(Malaysia) Chan C M** **(Malaysia) Chew C E**	**21**	**24**
6	**(South Korea) Jung J-s** **(South Korea) Lee Y-d**	**21**	**21**
(South Korea) Cho G-w (South Korea) Han S-h	14	14
(Poland) M Łogosz (Poland) R Mateusiak	17	**21**	15
**(China) Chai B** **(China) Liu XL**	**21**	15	**21**

Second Round
4	**(Malaysia) M Zakry A L** **(Malaysia) M Fairuzizuan M T**	**21**	**21**
(Malaysia) Chan C M (Malaysia) Chew C E	16	13
6	**(South Korea) Jung J-s** **(South Korea) Lee Y-d**	**21**	**21**
(China) Chai B (China) Liu XL	18	13

Quarter-finals
4	(Malaysia) M Zakry A L (Malaysia) M Fairuzizuan M T	10	15
6	**(South Korea) Jung J-s** **(South Korea) Lee Y-d**	**21**	**21**

=== Bottom half ===
==== Section 3 ====
First Round
**(Indonesia) L Hadiyanto** **(Indonesia) J Riyadi**	**21**	**21**
(Chinese Taipei) Chen H-l (Chinese Taipei) Lin Y-l	11	18
**(England) A Clark** **(England) N Robertson**	15	**21**	**21**
7	(Indonesia) M Ahsan (Indonesia) B Septano	**21**	16	10
(Chinese Taipei) Fang C-m (Chinese Taipei) Lee S-m	15	**21**	12
**(China) Guo ZD** **(China) Xu C**	**21**	12	**21**
(Netherlands) J de Ruiter (Netherlands) J Wouters	16	12
3	**(Malaysia) Koo K K** **(Malaysia) Tan B H**	**21**	**21**

Second Round
**(Indonesia) L Hadiyanto** **(Indonesia) J Riyadi**	**21**	**24**
(England) A Clark (England) N Robertson	16	22
(China) Guo ZD (China) Xu C	**21**	14	20
3	**(Malaysia) Koo K K** **(Malaysia) Tan B H**	16	**21**	**22**

Quarter-finals
(Indonesia) L Hadiyanto (Indonesia) J Riyadi	11	**21**	11
3	**(Malaysia) Koo K K** **(Malaysia) Tan B H**	**21**	17	**21**

==== Section 4 ====
First Round
**(Indonesia) Y S Dasuki** **(Indonesia) R Sukmawan**	**21**	**21**
Q1	(Germany) K Hopp (Germany) J Schöttler	17	19
(Indonesia) F Kurniawan (Indonesia) L Lie	14	6
5	**(China) Cai Y** **(China) Fu HF**	**21**	**21**
(Netherlands) R Bosch (Netherlands) K Ridder	13	15
Q4	**(Indonesia) A Nugroho** **(Indonesia) R Wijaya**	**21**	**21**
Q2	**(United States) H Bach** **(United States) T Gunawan**	**21**	**21**
PFQ	(India) R Kumar (India) S Thomas	15	19

Second Round
(Indonesia) Y S Dasuki (Indonesia) R Sukmawan	14	11
5	**(China) Cai Y** **(China) Fu HF**	**21**	**21**
Q4	(Indonesia) A Nugroho (Indonesia) R Wijaya	8	**22**	15
Q2	**(United States) H Bach** **(United States) T Gunawan**	**21**	20	**21**

Quarter-finals
5	**(China) Cai Y** **(China) Fu HF**	**21**	**21**
Q2	(United States) H Bach (United States) T Gunawan	14	14

== Women's doubles ==
=== Seeds ===
1. (Malaysia) **Chin Eei Hui / Wong Pei Tty (champions)**
2. (China) Cheng Shu / Zhao Yunlei (final)
3. (Chinese Taipei) Cheng Wen Hsing / Chien Yu Chin (semifinals)
4. (South Korea) Ha Jung-eun / Kim Min-jung (semifinals)
5. Blank
6. (China) Zhang Yawen / Zhao Tingting (quarterfinals)
7. (South Korea) Lee Kyung-won / Lee Hyo-jung (quarterfinals)
8. (Indonesia) Shendy Puspa Irawati / Meiliana Jauhari (withdrew)

=== Finals ===
Semi-finals
1	**(Malaysia) Chin Eei Hui** **(Malaysia) Wong Pei Tty**	**21**	**21**
3	(Chinese Taipei) Cheng Wen Hsing (Chinese Taipei) Chien Yu Chin	17	17
4	(South Korea) Ha Jung-eun (South Korea) Kim Min-jung	13	12
2	**(China) Cheng Shu** **(China) Zhao Yunlei**	**21**	**21**

Final
1	**(Malaysia) Chin Eei Hui** **(Malaysia) Wong Pei Tty**	**21**	**21**
2	(China) Cheng Shu (China) Zhao Yunlei	16	16

=== Top half ===
==== Section 1 ====
First Round
1	**(Malaysia) Chin E H** **(Malaysia) Wong P T**
BYE
**(India) J Gutta** **(India) A Ponnappa**	**21**	21	**21**
(United States) M Santoso (United States) C Tuwankotta	19	**23**	16
7	**(South Korea) Lee H-j** **(South Korea) Lee K-w**	**21**	**21**
(Thailand) D Aroonkesorn (Thailand) K Voravichitchaikul	14	12
(Denmark) L F Kristiansen (Denmark) K R Juhl
**(China) Pan P** **(China) Tian Q**	w	/	o

Second Round
1	**(Malaysia) Chin E H** **(Malaysia) Wong P T**	**21**	19	**21**
(India) J Gutta (India) A Ponnappa	9	**21**	15
7	**(South Korea) Lee H-j** **(South Korea) Lee K-w**	**21**	16	**21**
(China) Pan P (China) Tian Q	19	**21**	16

Quarter-finals
1	**(Malaysia) Chin E H** **(Malaysia) Wong P T**	**21**	9	**21**
7	(South Korea) Lee H-j (South Korea) Lee K-w	14	**21**	18

==== Section 2 ====
First Round
3	**(Chinese Taipei) Cheng W-h** **(Chinese Taipei) Chien Y-c**	w	/	o
(Singapore) F Liu (Singapore) V Neo
**(Indonesia) A F Agustin** **(Indonesia) A Wahyuni**	**21**	**21**
(Malaysia) Ng H L (Malaysia) Woon K W	14	15
(China) Du J (China) Yu Y
**(South Korea) Chang Y-n** **(South Korea) Kim M-y**	w	/	o
(Singapore) S M Sari (Singapore) Yao L	23	16
**(Chinese Taipei) Chang H-y** **(Chinese Taipei) Chou C-c**	**25**	**21**

Second Round
3	**(Chinese Taipei) Cheng W-h** **(Chinese Taipei) Chien Y-c**	**21**	**21**
(Indonesia) A F Agustin (Indonesia) A Wahyuni	12	18
(South Korea) Chang Y-n (South Korea) Kim M-y	19	**21**	21
**(Chinese Taipei) Chang H-y** **(Chinese Taipei) Chou C-c**	**21**	18	**23**

Quarter-finals
3	**(Chinese Taipei) Cheng W-h** **(Chinese Taipei) Chien Y-c**	**21**	19	**21**
(Chinese Taipei) Chang H-y (Chinese Taipei) Chou C-c	11	**21**	12

=== Bottom half ===
==== Section 3 ====
First Round
(England) J Wallwork (England) G White	13	**21**	18
**(Indonesia) N Melati** **(Indonesia) N Poluakan**	**21**	18	**21**
**(Bulgaria) P Nedelcheva** **(Russia) A Russkikh**	w	/	o
8	(Indonesia) S P Irawati (Indonesia) M Jauhari
(Denmark) H Nielsen (Denmark) M Røpke
**(Germany) N Grether** **(Canada) C Reid**	w	/	o
(Indonesia) K Dewi (Indonesia) K N Hanadia	**21**	4	10
4	**(South Korea) Ha J-e** **(South Korea) Kim M-j**	14	**21**	**21**

Second Round
(Indonesia) N Melati (Indonesia) N Poluakan	17	20
**(Bulgaria) P Nedelcheva** **(Russia) A Russkikh**	**21**	**22**
(Germany) N Grether (Canada) C Reid	19	9
4	**(South Korea) Ha J-e** **(South Korea) Kim M-j**	**21**	**21**

Quarter-finals
(Bulgaria) P Nedelcheva (Russia) A Russkikh	19	19
4	**(South Korea) Ha J-e** **(South Korea) Kim M-j**	**21**	**21**

==== Section 4 ====
First Round
**(Scotland) I Bankier** **(England) D Kellogg**	**21**	**21**
(Indonesia) R Mundiasti (Indonesia) J Novita	12	18
(Netherlands) R van Cutsen (Netherlands) P van Dooremalen	13	19
6	**(China) Zhang YW** **(China) Zhao TT**	**21**	**21**
(Indonesia) P Z Bernadet (Indonesia) D Susanto	14	15
**(Indonesia) N K Maheswari** **(Indonesia) G Polii**	**21**	**21**
BYE
2	**(China) Cheng S** **(China) Zhao YL**

Second Round
(Scotland) I Bankier (England) D Kellogg	11	10
6	**(China) Zhang YW** **(China) Zhao TT**	**21**	**21**
(Indonesia) N K Maheswari (Indonesia) G Polii	**23**	11	8
2	**(China) Cheng S** **(China) Zhao YL**	21	**21**	**21**

Quarter-finals
6	(China) Zhang YW (China) Zhao TT	17	**21**	13
2	**(China) Cheng S** **(China) Zhao YL**	**21**	10	**21**

== Mixed doubles ==
=== Seeds ===
1. (Indonesia) Nova Widianto / Liliyana Natsir (quarterfinals)
2. (South Korea) Lee Yong-dae / Lee Hyo-jung (final)
3. (China) He Hanbin / Yu Yang (withdrew)
4. (Denmark) Thomas Laybourn / Kamilla Rytter Juhl (semifinals)
5. (China) **Zheng Bo / Ma Jin (champion)**
6. (China) Xie Zhongbo / Zhang Yawen (quarterfinals)
7. (Denmark) Joachim Fischer Nielsen / Christinna Pedersen (semifinals)
8. (Thailand) Sudket Prapakamol / Saralee Thungthongkam (withdrew)

=== Finals ===
Semi-finals
5	**(China) Zheng Bo** **(China) Ma Jin**	18	**21**	**21**
4	(Denmark) Thomas Laybourn (Denmark) Kamilla Rytter Juhl	**21**	17	11
7	(Denmark) Joachim Fischer Nielsen (Denmark) Christinna Pedersen	13	13
2	**(South Korea) Lee Yong-dae** **(South Korea) Lee Hyo-jung**	**21**	**21**

Final
5	**(China) Zheng Bo** **(China) Ma Jin**	**21**	8	**21**
2	(South Korea) Lee Yong-dae (South Korea) Lee Hyo-jung	17	**21**	16

=== Top half ===
==== Section 1 ====
First Round
1	**(Indonesia) N Widianto** **(Indonesia) L Natsir**	**22**	**21**
(Chinese Taipei) Wang C-m (Chinese Taipei) Wang P-r	20	13
(Indonesia) F Limpele (Russia) A Russkikh	**21**	18	16
**(South Korea) Yoo Y-s** **(South Korea) Kim M-j**	18	**21**	**21**
5	**(China) Zheng B** **(China) Ma J**	**21**	**21**
Q1	(Germany) T Dettmann (Germany) N Grether	14	9
Q3	(Malaysia) M Fairuzizuan M Tazari (Malaysia) Wong P T	19	16
**(Indonesia) H A Gunawan** **(Indonesia) V Marissa**	**21**	**21**

Second Round
1	**(Indonesia) N Widianto** **(Indonesia) L Natsir**	**21**	**21**
(South Korea) Yoo Y-s (South Korea) Kim M-j	17	17
5	**(China) Zheng B** **(China) Ma J**	**21**	**21**
(Indonesia) H A Gunawan (Indonesia) V Marissa	16	12

Quarter-finals
1	(Indonesia) N Widianto (Indonesia) L Natsir	17	18
5	**(China) Zheng B** **(China) Ma J**	**21**	**21**

==== Section 2 ====
First Round
4	**(Denmark) T Laybourn** **(Denmark) K R Juhl**	14	**21**	**21**
(Indonesia) D Lahardi (Indonesia) L Nurlita	**21**	9	10
**(Malaysia) M Razif A L** **(Malaysia) Woon K W**	22	**21**	**22**
(Thailand) S Anugritayawon (Thailand) K Voravichitchaikul	**24**	18	20
6	**(China) Xie ZB** **(China) Zhang YW**	**21**	**24**
(England) A Clark (England) D Kellogg	16	22
(Netherlands) R Bosch (Netherlands) P van Dooremalen	8	15
Q2	**(Indonesia) F Kurniawan** **(Indonesia) P Z Bernadet**	**21**	**21**

Second Round
4	**(Denmark) T Laybourn** **(Denmark) K R Juhl**	**21**	**21**
(Malaysia) M Razif A L (Malaysia) Woon K W	13	19
6	**(China) Xie ZB** **(China) Zhang YW**	**21**	**21**
Q2	(Indonesia) F Kurniawan (Indonesia) P Z Bernadet	16	15

Quarter-finals
4	**(Denmark) T Laybourn** **(Denmark) K R Juhl**	**21**	**21**
6	(China) Xie ZB (China) Zhang YW	11	16

=== Bottom half ===
==== Section 3 ====
First Round
**(South Korea) Ko S-h** **(South Korea) Ha J-e**	18	**23**	**21**
Q4	(Indonesia) M Rijal (Indonesia) D Susanto	**21**	21	16
(Chinese Taipei) Chen H-l (Chinese Taipei) Chou C-c	14	19
7	**(Denmark) J F Nielsen** **(Denmark) C Pedersen**	**21**	**21**
(Hong Kong) Chau H W (Hong Kong) Y H Wiratama	9	**21**	17
**(England) N Robertson** **(England) J Wallwork**	**21**	19	**21**
(Poland) R Mateusiak (Poland) N Kostiuczyk	**25**	18	15
PFQ	**(South Korea) Han S-h** **(South Korea) Jang Y-na**	23	**21**	**21**

Second Round
(South Korea) Ko S-h (South Korea) Ha J-e	13	16
7	**(Denmark) J F Nielsen** **(Denmark) C Pedersen**	**21**	**21**
(England) N Robertson (England) J Wallwork	15	16
PFQ	**(South Korea) Han S-h** **(South Korea) Jang Y-na**	**21**	**21**

Quarter-finals
7	**(Denmark) J F Nielsen** **(Denmark) C Pedersen**	20	**21**	**21**
PFQ	(South Korea) Han S-h (South Korea) Jang Y-na	**22**	17	16

==== Section 4 ====
First Round
(Netherlands) J de Ruiter (Netherlands) I Vaessen	**21**	19	10
**(England) R Blair** **(Scotland) I Bankier**	16	**21**	**21**
(Chinese Taipei) Fang C-m (Chinese Taipei) Cheng W-h	13	16
8	**(Thailand) S Prapakamol** **(Thailand) S Thungthongkam**	**21**	**21**
**(Malaysia) Koo K K** **(Malaysia) Ng H L**	13	**21**	**21**
(India) D Valiyaveetil (India) J Gutta	**21**	16	19
(England) C Adcock (England) G White	9	6
2	**(South Korea) Lee Y-d** **(South Korea) Lee H-j**	**21**	**21**

Second Round
**(England) R Blair** **(Scotland) I Bankier**	**21**	11	**21**
8	(Thailand) S Prapakamol (Thailand) S Thungthongkam	19	**21**	11
(Malaysia) Koo K K (Malaysia) Ng H L	16	17
2	**(South Korea) Lee Y-d** **(South Korea) Lee H-j**	**21**	**21**

Quarter-finals
(England) R Blair (Scotland) I Bankier	12	18
2	**(South Korea) Lee Y-d** **(South Korea) Lee H-j**	**21**	**21**
