= 2008 Korea Open Super Series =

Tournament details
- Dates: January 22, 2008 - January 27, 2008
- Edition: 17th
- Total prize money: US$300,000
- Venue: Jangchung Gymnasium
- Location: Seoul, South Korea

The 2008 Korea Open Super Series is the second tournament of the 2008 BWF Super Series in badminton. It was held in Seoul, South Korea from January 22 to January 27, 2008.

The men's singles final marred by the incident between Lin Dan and Korea coach Li Mao.

== Men's singles ==
=== Seeds ===
1. (China) Lin Dan
2. (Malaysia) Lee Chong Wei
3. (China) Bao Chunlai
4. (China) Chen Hong
5. (Denmark) Peter Gade
6. (Indonesia) Sony Dwi Kuncoro
7. (Indonesia) Taufik Hidayat
8. (Denmark) Kenneth Jonassen

=== Results ===
1st round
1	(China) Lin Dan	21	21
(Thailand) Boonsak Ponsana	17	18
(Malaysia) Sairul Amar Ayob	13	17
(Hong Kong) Chan Yan Kit	21	21
6	(Indonesia) Sony Dwi Kuncoro	21	21
(Malaysia) Yeoh Kay Bin	14	13
Q1	(South Korea) Shon Seung-mo	21	18	21
(Singapore) Lee Yen Hui Kendrick	9	21	15
3	(China) Bao Chunlai	21	21
(Netherlands) Dicky Palyama	11	16
(Malaysia) Lee Tsuen Seng	19	21	10
(Malaysia) Wong Choong Hann	21	16	21
5	(Denmark) Peter Gade	21	21
(China) Chen Yu	15	18
(Poland) Przemyslaw Wacha	19	21	19
(Hong Kong) Ng Wei	21	16	21
(England) Andrew Smith PFQ	9	21	21
Q2	(South Korea) Hong Ji-hoon	21	16	18
Q3	(South Korea) Jang Young-soo	16	10
8	(Denmark) Kenneth Jonassen	21	21
(Malaysia) Roslin Hashim	16	17
(Japan) Shoji Sato	21	21
Q4	(South Korea) Lee Cheol-ho	17	9
4	(China) Chen Jin	21	21
(Malaysia) Hafiz Hashim	12	10
(Indonesia) Simon Santoso	21	21
(South Korea) Park Sung-hwan	21	21
(Wales) Richard Vaughan PFQ	10	8
(South Korea) Lee Hyun-il	21	21
(Japan) Sho Sasaki	14	19
(Canada) Andrew Dabeka	9	9
2	(Malaysia) Lee Chong Wei	21	21

2nd round
(China) Lin Dan	21	21
(Hong Kong) Chan Yan Kit	12	14
(Indonesia) Sony Dwi Kuncoro	21	21
(South Korea) Shon Seung-mo	19	10
(China) Bao Chunlai	21	14	21
(Malaysia) Wong Choong Hann	19	21	19
(Denmark) Peter Gade	21	21
(Hong Kong) Ng Wei	13	14
(England) Andrew Smith	19	21	11
(Denmark) Kenneth Jonassen	21	13	21
(Japan) Shoji Sato	12	10
(China) Chen Jin	21	21
(Indonesia) Simon Santoso	10	21	18
(South Korea) Park Sung-hwan	21	17	21
(South Korea) Lee Hyun-il	19	21
(Malaysia) Lee Chong Wei	21	17	R

Quarterfinals
(China) Lin Dan	13	21	21
(Indonesia) Sony Dwi Kuncoro	21	11	19
(China) Bao Chunlai	21	21	21
(Denmark) Peter Gade	17	23	23
(Denmark) Kenneth Jonassen	21	21
(China) Chen Jin	11	19
(South Korea) Park Sung-hwan	17	18
(South Korea) Lee Hyun-il	21	21

Semifinals
(China) Lin Dan	21	21
(Denmark) Peter Gade	12	14
Finals
(China) Lin Dan	21	21	23
(South Korea) Lee Hyun-il	4	23	25
(Denmark) Kenneth Jonassen	20	17
(South Korea) Lee Hyun-il	22	21

== Women's singles ==
=== Seeds ===
1. (China) Xie Xingfang
2. (China) Zhang Ning
3. (China) Lu Lan
4. (France) Pi Hongyan
5. (Hong Kong) Wang Chen
6. (Germany) Xu Huaiwen
7. (Malaysia) Wong Mew Choo
8. (Hong Kong) Yip Pui Yin

=== Results ===
1st round
(Ukraine) Larisa Griga PFQ	12	21	16
Q1	(South Korea) Bae Youn-joo	21	19	21
(Germany) Juliane Schenk	21	21
(South Korea) Hwang Hye-youn	18	19
7	(Malaysia) Wong Mew Choo	11	16
Q2	(South Korea) Lee Yun-hwa	21	21
(Chinese Taipei) Cheng Shao-chieh	21	21
(Singapore) Li Li	13	12
3	(China) Lu Lan	21	19	21
(Netherlands) Yao Jie	15	21	11
(Netherlands) Judith Meulendijks	24	12	21
Q3	(Scotland) Susan Hughes	22	21	18
5	(Hong Kong) Wang Chen	14	21	21
Q4	(South Korea) Lee Hyun-jin	21	7	9
(Japan) Eriko Hirose	15	21	19
(Japan) Kaori Mori	21	16	21
(Japan) Yu Hirayama	11	21	21
(Indonesia) Adriyanti Firdasari PFQ	21	12	15
(Canada) Anna Rice	21	18	11
6	(Germany) Xu Huaiwen	19	21	21
(England) Elizabeth Cann PFQ	15	22	21
(Japan) Kanako Yonekura	21	20	15
(South Korea) Jun Jae-youn	21	21
4	(France) Pi Hongyan	19	18
(Hong Kong) Zhou Mi	21	21
(Russia) Ella Diehl	13	12
(England) Tracey Hallam	19	13
(Hong Kong) Yip Pui Yin	21	21
(Thailand) Salakjit Ponsana	16	15
(Malaysia) Julia Wong Pei Xian	21	21
(Bulgaria) Petya Nedelcheva	19	23
2	(China) Zhang Ning	21	21

2nd round
(South Korea) Bae Youn-joo	16	8
(Germany) Juliane Schenk	21	21
(South Korea) Lee Yun-hwa	17	21	18
(Chinese Taipei) Cheng Shao-chieh	21	16	21
(China) Lu Lan	21	20	21
(Netherlands) Judith Meulendijks	15	22	17
(Hong Kong) Wang Chen	17	21	21
(Japan) Kaori Mori	21	12	7
(Japan) Yu Hirayama	15	11
(Germany) Xu Huaiwen	21	21
(England) Elizabeth Cann	17	18
(South Korea) Jun Jae-youn	21	21
(Hong Kong) Zhou Mi	21	21
(Hong Kong) Yip Pui Yin	15	18
(Malaysia) Julia Wong Pei Xian	17	21	12
(China) Zhang Ning	21	19	21

Quarterfinals
(Germany) Juliane Schenk	21	8	17
(Chinese Taipei) Cheng Shao-chieh	17	21	21
(China) Lu Lan	21	11	21
(Hong Kong) Wang Chen	18	21	18
(Germany) Xu Huaiwen	7	7
(South Korea) Jun Jae-youn	21	21
(Hong Kong) Zhou Mi	21	23
(China) Zhang Ning	19	21

Semifinals
(Chinese Taipei) Cheng Shao-chieh	12	13
(China) Lu Lan	21	21
Finals
(China) Lu Lan	18	21	15
(Hong Kong) Zhou Mi	21	15	21
(South Korea) Jun Jae-youn	16	12
(Hong Kong) Zhou Mi	21	21

== Men's doubles ==
=== Seeds ===
1. (Indonesia) Markis Kido / Hendra Setiawan
2. (China) Cai Yun / Fu Haifeng
3. (South Korea) Jung Jae-sung / Lee Yong-dae
4. (Denmark) Jens Eriksen / Martin Lundgaard Hansen
5. (South Korea) Lee Jae-jin / Hwang Ji-man
6. (Indonesia) Luluk Hadiyanto / Alvent Yulianto
7. (China) Guo Zhendong / Xie Zhongbo
8. (Japan) Tadashi Ohtsuka / Keita Masuda

=== Results ===
1st round
1	(Indonesia) Markis Kido (Indonesia) Hendra Setiawan	21	21
PFQ	(England) Robert Adcock (England) Robin Middleton	19	10
Q2	(Netherlands) Dicky Palyama (Netherlands) Eric Pang	11	12
(Denmark) Lars Paaske (Denmark) Jonas Rasmussen	21	21
7	(China) Guo Zhendong (China) Xie Zhongbo	22	10	17
(Indonesia) Hendra Gunawan (Indonesia) Joko Riyadi	20	21	21
(Chinese Taipei) Fang Chieh-min (Chinese Taipei) Lee Sheng-mu	21	21
Q1	(South Korea) Kang Myeong-won (South Korea) Shin Baek-cheol	16	17
(South Korea) Jung Jae-sung (South Korea) Lee Yong-dae	21	21
(Chinese Taipei) Chien Yu-hsun (Chinese Taipei) Lin Yu-lang	10	16
(Malaysia) Chew Choon Eng (Malaysia) Chan Chong Ming	24	21	21
Q4	(South Korea) Cho Gun-woo (South Korea) Yoo Yeon-seong	26	18	19
6	(Indonesia) Luluk Hadiyanto (Indonesia) Alvent Yulianto	21	21
(Thailand) Sudket Prapakamol (Thailand) Patapol Ngernsrisuk	14	17
(Russia) Vitali Durkin (Russia) Aleksandr Nikolaenko	5	13
(Malaysia) Zakry Latif (Malaysia) Fairuzizuan Tazari	21	21
(Germany) Kristof Hopp (Germany) Ingo Kindervater	19	17
(Poland) Michał Łogosz (Poland) Robert Mateusiak	21	21
(England) Robert Blair (England) David Lindley	21	16	11
5	(South Korea) Lee Jae-jin (South Korea) Hwang Ji-man	17	21	21
(Denmark) Mathias Boe (Denmark) Carsten Mogensen	21	21
Q3	(England) Anthony Clark (England) Chris Adcock	14	17
(Japan) Shuichi Sakamoto (Japan) Shintaro Ikeda	21	21
4	(Denmark) Jens Eriksen (Denmark) Martin Lundgaard	19	14
(Canada) Mike Beres (Canada) William Milroy	17	16
(Hong Kong) Albertus Susanto (Hong Kong) Yohan Hadikusumo	21	21
(South Korea) Kwon Yi-goo (South Korea) Ko Sung-hyun	20	19
8	(Japan) Tadashi Ohtsuka (Japan) Keita Masuda	21	21
(Chinese Taipei) Tsai Chia-Hsin (Chinese Taipei) Hu Chung-Shien	21	21
(United States) Howard Bach (United States) Khan Bob Malaythong	14	14
(Denmark) Simon Mollyhus (Denmark) Anders Kristiansen	21	11
2	(China) Fu Haifeng (China) Cai Yun	23	21

2nd round
(Indonesia) Markis Kido (Indonesia) Hendra Setiawan	18	12
(Denmark) Lars Paaske (Denmark) Jonas Rasmussen	21	21
(Indonesia) Hendra Gunawan (Indonesia) Joko Riyadi	16	21	16
(Chinese Taipei) Fang Chieh-min (Chinese Taipei) Lee Sheng-mu	21	19	21
(South Korea) Jung Jae-sung (South Korea) Lee Yong-dae	21	21	11
R	(Malaysia) Chew Choon Eng (Malaysia) Chan Chong Ming	13	23	3
(Indonesia) Luluk Hadiyanto (Indonesia) Alvent Yulianto	21	19	21
(Malaysia) Zakry Latif (Malaysia) Fairuzizuan Tazari	19	21	12
(Poland) Michał Łogosz (Poland) Robert Mateusiak	10	10
(South Korea) Lee Jae-jin (South Korea) Hwang Ji-man	21	21
(Denmark) Mathias Boe (Denmark) Carsten Mogensen	21	21
(Japan) Shuichi Sakamoto (Japan) Shintaro Ikeda	17	16
(Hong Kong) Albertus Susanto (Hong Kong) Yohan Hadikusumo	22	21
(Japan) Tadashi Ohtsuka (Japan) Keita Masuda	20	14
(Chinese Taipei) Tsai Chia-Hsin (Chinese Taipei) Hu Chung-Shien	21	11	18
(China) Fu Haifeng (China) Cai Yun	17	21	21

Quarterfinals
(Denmark) Lars Paaske (Denmark) Jonas Rasmussen	21	21
(Chinese Taipei) Fang Chieh-min (Chinese Taipei) Lee Sheng-mu	18	12
(South Korea) Jung Jae-sung (South Korea) Lee Yong-dae	21	15	17
(Indonesia) Luluk Hadiyanto (Indonesia) Alvent Yulianto	11	21	21
(South Korea) Lee Jae-jin (South Korea) Hwang Ji-man	17	16
(Denmark) Mathias Boe (Denmark) Carsten Mogensen	21	21
(Hong Kong) Albertus Susanto (Hong Kong) Yohan Hadikusumo	15	15
(China) Fu Haifeng (China) Cai Yun	21	21

Semifinals
(Denmark) Lars Paaske (Denmark) Jonas Rasmussen	16	13
(Indonesia) Luluk Hadiyanto (Indonesia) Alvent Yulianto	21	21
Finals
(Indonesia) Luluk Hadiyanto (Indonesia) Alvent Yulianto	7	22	17
(China) Fu Haifeng (China) Cai Yun	21	20	21
(Denmark) Mathias Boe (Denmark) Carsten Mogensen	22	18
(China) Fu Haifeng (China) Cai Yun	24	21

== Women's doubles ==
=== Seeds ===
1. (China) Zhang Yawen / Wei Yili
2. (China) Yang Wei / Zhang Jiewen
3. (South Korea) Lee Kyung-won / Lee Hyo-jung
4. (China) Du Jing / Yu Yang
5. (Chinese Taipei) Chien Yu-chin / Cheng Wen-hsing
6. (Japan) Kumiko Ogura / Reiko Shiota
7. (England) Gail Emms / Donna Kellogg
8. (Indonesia) Lilyana Natsir / Vita Marissa

=== Results ===
1st round
1	(China) Zhang Yawen (China) Wei Yili	21	21
PFQ	(United States) Eva Lee (United States) Mesinee Mangkalakiri	9	10
(South Korea) Ha Jung-eun (South Korea) Kim Min-jung	21	21
PFQ	(Hong Kong) Koon Wai Chee (Hong Kong) Chau Hoi Wah	16	19
8	(Indonesia) Lilyana Natsir (Indonesia) Vita Marissa	21	21
(Singapore) Jiang Yanmei (Singapore) Li Yujia	18	14
(Japan) Miyuki Maeda (Japan) Satoko Suetsuna	17	11
(Poland) Kamila Augustyn (Poland) Nadieżda Kostiuczyk	21	21
4	(China) Du Jing (China) Yu Yang	21	21
(Thailand) Duanganong Aroonkesorn (Thailand) Kunchala Voravichitchaikul	10	8
Q3	(South Korea) Hong Soo-jung (South Korea) Sun In-jang	11	16
(Sweden) Johanna Persson (Sweden) Elin Bergblom	21	21
5	(Chinese Taipei) Chien Yu-chin (Chinese Taipei) Cheng Wen-hsing	21	22
(Russia) Nina Vislova (Russia) Valeria Sorokina	14	20
(England) Suzanne Rayappan (England) Jenny Wallwork	18	21	21
(Canada) Fiona McKee (Canada) Charmaine Reid	21	17	19
(Japan) Aki Akao (Japan) Tomomi Matsuda	21	17	21
Q4	(Malaysia) Fong Chew Yen (Malaysia) Mooi Hing Yau	18	21	13
(Malaysia) Wong Pei Tty (Malaysia) Chin Eei Hui	WO
7	(England) Donna Kellogg (England) Gail Emms
(England) Joanne Nicholas (England) Natalie Munt	15	12
(Russia) Anastasia Russkikh (Russia) Ekaterina Ananina	21	21
Q1	(Indonesia) Nitya Krishinda Maheswari (Indonesia) Lita Nurlita	14	10
3	(South Korea) Lee Kyung-won (South Korea) Lee Hyo-jung	21	21
(Indonesia) Jo Novita (Indonesia) Greysia Polii	21	20	17
(Indonesia) Endang Nursugianti (Indonesia) Rani Mundiasti	12	22	21
Q2	(Netherlands) Judith Meulendijks (Netherlands) Yao Jie	14	18
6	(Japan) Kumiko Ogura (Japan) Reiko Shiota	21	21
(Malaysia) Lim Pek Siah (Malaysia) Haw Chiou Hwee	21	12	21
(France) Elodie Eymard (France) Weny Rahmawati	14	21	14
(China) Gao Ling (China) Zhao Tingting	WO
2	(China) Yang Wei (China) Zhang Jiewen

2nd round
(China) Zhang Yawen (China) Wei Yili	21	21
(South Korea) Ha Jung-eun (South Korea) Kim Min-jung	11	14
(Indonesia) Lilyana Natsir (Indonesia) Vita Marissa	21	21
(Poland) Kamila Augustyn (Poland) Nadieżda Kostiuczyk	10	16
(China) Du Jing (China) Yu Yang	21	21
(Sweden) Johanna Persson (Sweden) Elin Bergblom	11	10
(Chinese Taipei) Chien Yu-chin (Chinese Taipei) Cheng Wen-hsing	21	21
(England) Suzanne Rayappan (England) Jenny Wallwork	12	7
(Japan) Aki Akao (Japan) Tomomi Matsuda	12	13
(Malaysia) Wong Pei Tty (Malaysia) Chin Eei Hui	21	21
(Russia) Anastasia Russkikh (Russia) Ekaterina Ananina	14	10
(South Korea) Lee Kyung-won (South Korea) Lee Hyo-jung	21	21
(Indonesia) Endang Nursugianti (Indonesia) Rani Mundiasti	10	20
(Japan) Kumiko Ogura (Japan) Reiko Shiota	21	22
(Malaysia) Lim Pek Siah (Malaysia) Haw Chiou Hwee	15	7
(China) Gao Ling (China) Zhao Tingting	21	21

Quarterfinals
(China) Zhang Yawen (China) Wei Yili	21	7	21
(Indonesia) Lilyana Natsir (Indonesia) Vita Marissa	9	21	19
(China) Du Jing (China) Yu Yang	21	17	21
(Chinese Taipei) Chien Yu-chin (Chinese Taipei) Cheng Wen-hsing	7	21	11
(Malaysia) Wong Pei Tty (Malaysia) Chin Eei Hui	14	10
(South Korea) Lee Kyung-won (South Korea) Lee Hyo-jung	21	21
(Japan) Kumiko Ogura (Japan) Reiko Shiota	18	17
(China) Gao Ling (China) Zhao Tingting	21	21

Semifinals
(China) Zhang Yawen (China) Wei Yili	21	18	17
(China) Du Jing (China) Yu Yang	17	21	21
Finals
(China) Du Jing (China) Yu Yang	21	21
(China) Gao Ling (China) Zhao Tingting	15	13
(South Korea) Lee Kyung-won (South Korea) Lee Hyo-jung	16	9
(China) Gao Ling (China) Zhao Tingting	21	21

== Mixed doubles ==
=== Seeds ===
1. (China) Zheng Bo / Gao Ling
2. (Indonesia) Nova Widianto / Lilyana Natsir
3. (China) Xie Zhongbo / Zhang Yawen
4. (Indonesia) Flandy Limpele / Vita Marissa
5. (England) Nathan Robertson / Gail Emms
6. (China) He Hanbin / Yu Yang
7. (Denmark) Thomas Laybourn / Kamilla Rytter Juhl
8. (Thailand) Sudket Prapakamol / Saralee Thungthongkam

=== Results ===
1st round
PFQ	(Chinese Taipei) Chen Hung-ling (Chinese Taipei) Chou Chia-Chi	21	21
(Russia) Aleksandr Nikolaenko (Russia) Nina Vislova	11	12
(England) Anthony Clark (England) Donna Kellogg	21	21
PFQ	(Thailand) Songphon Anugritayawon (Thailand) Kunchala Voravichitchaikul	11	8
5	(England) Nathan Robertson (England) Gail Emms
(Philippines) Kennevic Asuncion (Philippines) Kennie Asuncion	WO
Q	(Denmark) Jens Eriksen (Denmark) Helle Nielsen	21	21
(England) David Lindley (England) Suzanne Rayappan	17	11
4	(Indonesia) Flandy Limpele (Indonesia) Vita Marissa	21	21
(Chinese Taipei) Fang Chieh-min (Chinese Taipei) Cheng Wen-hsing	10	17
(Poland) Robert Mateusiak (Poland) Nadieżda Kostiuczyk	17	21	20
(Indonesia) Devin Fitriawan (Indonesia) Lita Nurlita	21	15	22
6	(China) He Hanbin (China) Yu Yang	21	16	16
(Denmark) Joachim Fischer Nielsen (Denmark) Britta Andersen	13	21	21
(Japan) Keita Masuda (Japan) Miyuki Maeda	16	21	18
(Indonesia) Muhammad Rijal (Indonesia) Greysia Polii	21	14	21
(Germany) Kristof Hopp (Germany) Birgit Overzier	15	17
(China) Xu Chen (China) Zhao Tingting	21	21
(South Korea) Han Sang-hoon (South Korea) Hwang Yu-mi	18	21	21
8	(Thailand) Sudket Prapakamol (Thailand) Saralee Thoungthongkam	21	11	23
(United States) Howard Bach (United States) Eva Lee	21	19	19
Q	(South Korea) Ko Sung-hyun (South Korea) Ha Jung-eun	13	21	21
Q	(South Korea) Yoo Yeon-seong (South Korea) Kim Min-jung	15	18
(China) Xie Zhongbo (China) Zhang Yawen	21	21
Q	(Poland) Michał Łogosz (England) Natalie Munt	21	21
(Chinese Taipei) Hsieh Yu-hsin (Chinese Taipei) Chien Yu-chin	17	8
PFQ	(Malaysia) Tan Wee Kiong (Malaysia) Woon Khe Wei	21	19	11
(Denmark) Thomas Laybourn (Denmark) Kamilla Rytter Juhl	19	21	21
(Germany) Ingo Kindervater (Germany) Kathrin Piotrowski	14	21	25
(Russia) Vitali Durkin (Russia) Valeria Sorokina	21	16	27
(South Korea) Lee Yong-dae (South Korea) Lee Hyo-jung	16	21	21
(Indonesia) Nova Widianto (Indonesia) Lilyana Natsir	21	12	14

2nd round
(Chinese Taipei) Chen Hung-ling (Chinese Taipei) Chou Chia-Chi	8	21	21
(England) Anthony Clark (England) Donna Kellogg	21	17	17
(Philippines) Kennevic Asuncion (Philippines) Kennie Asuncion	11	15
(Denmark) Jens Eriksen (Denmark) Helle Nielsen	21	21
(Indonesia) Flandy Limpele (Indonesia) Vita Marissa	21
(Indonesia) Devin Fitriawan (Indonesia) Lita Nurlita	12	R
(Denmark) Joachim Fischer Nielsen (Denmark) Britta Andersen	21	6	R
(Indonesia) Muhammad Rijal (Indonesia) Greysia Polii	17	10
(China) Xu Chen (China) Zhao Tingting	13	19
(Thailand) Sudket Prapakamol (Thailand) Saralee Thoungthongkam	21	21
(South Korea) Ko Sung-hyun (South Korea) Ha Jung-eun	13	22	11
(China) Xie Zhongbo (China) Zhang Yawen	21	20	21
(Poland) Michał Łogosz (England) Natalie Munt	13	10
(Denmark) Thomas Laybourn (Denmark) Kamilla Rytter Juhl	21	21
(Russia) Vitali Durkin (Russia) Valeria Sorokina	16	14
(South Korea) Lee Yong-dae (South Korea) Lee Hyo-jung	21	21

Quarterfinals
(Chinese Taipei) Chen Hung-ling (Chinese Taipei) Chou Chia-Chi	21	21
(Denmark) Jens Eriksen (Denmark) Helle Nielsen	17	18
(Indonesia) Flandy Limpele (Indonesia) Vita Marissa	21	21
(Indonesia) Muhammad Rijal (Indonesia) Greysia Polii	15	16
(Thailand) Sudket Prapakamol (Thailand) Saralee Thoungthongkam	18	11
(China) Xie Zhongbo (China) Zhang Yawen	21	21
(Denmark) Thomas Laybourn (Denmark) Kamilla Rytter Juhl	16	17
(South Korea) Lee Yong-dae (South Korea) Lee Hyo-jung	21	21

Semifinals
(Chinese Taipei) Chen Hung-ling (Chinese Taipei) Chou Chia-Chi	13	8
(Indonesia) Flandy Limpele (Indonesia) Vita Marissa	21	21
Finals
(Indonesia) Flandy Limpele (Indonesia) Vita Marissa	21	14	18
(South Korea) Lee Yong-dae (South Korea) Lee Hyo-jung	15	21	21
(China) Xie Zhongbo (China) Zhang Yawen	21	15	20
(South Korea) Lee Yong-dae (South Korea) Lee Hyo-jung	16	21	22
