= 2008 BWF Grand Prix Gold and Grand Prix =

The 2008 BWF Grand Prix Gold and Grand Prix was the second season of BWF Grand Prix Gold and Grand Prix with fourteen tournaments in contested. The season started with German Open in February and ended with Vietnam Open in December.

== Schedule ==
Below is the schedule released by Badminton World Federation:

Tour	Official title	Venue	City	Date	
Tour	Official title	Venue	City	Start	Finish
1	(Germany) German Open Grand Prix	RWE-Sporthalle	Mülheim	February 26	March 2
2	India Open Grand Prix Gold	Kotla Vijay Bhaskar Reddy Indoor Stadium	Hyderabad	April 1	April 6
3	Thailand Open Grand Prix Gold	Nimibutr Stadium	Bangkok	June 24	June 29
4	(United States) U.S. Open Grand Prix	Orange County Badminton Club	Orange	July 8	July 13
5	Chinese Taipei Open Grand Prix Gold	Taipei County Shinjuang Stadium	Taipei	September 9	September 14
6	Macau Open Grand Prix Gold	Tap Seac Multi-sports Pavilion	Macau	September 30	October 5
7	(Germany) Bitburger Open Grand Prix	Saarlandhalle Saarbrücken	Saarbrücken	September 30	October 5
8	Bulgaria Open Grand Prix	Sofia Sports Hall	Sofia	October 7	October 12
9	(Netherlands) Dutch Open Grand Prix	Topsportcentrum	Almere	October 14	October 19
10	Russia Open Grand Prix	Druzhba Multipurpose Arena	Moscow	November 4	November 9
11	New Zealand Open Grand Prix	North Shore Events Centre	Auckland	November 11	November 16
12	Vietnam Open Grand Prix	Phan Dinh Phung Stadium	Ho Chi Minh City	December 2	December 7

Grand Prix Gold

== Results ==
=== Winners ===
Tour	Men's singles	Women's singles	Men's doubles	Women's doubles	Mixed doubles
Germany	(South Korea) Lee Hyun-il	(South Korea) Jun Jae-youn	(South Korea) Lee Jae-jin (South Korea) Hwang Ji-man	(South Korea) Lee Kyung-won (South Korea) Lee Hyo-jung	(South Korea) Lee Yong-dae (South Korea) Lee Hyo-jung
India	(Thailand) Boonsak Ponsana	(Hong Kong) Zhou Mi	(China) Guo Zhendong (China) Xie Zhongbo	(Chinese Taipei) Chien Yu-chin (Chinese Taipei) Cheng Wen-hsing	(China) He Hanbin (China) Yu Yang
Thailand	(China) Lin Dan	(China) Xie Xingfang	(China) Cai Yun (China) Fu Haifeng	(China) Yang Wei (China) Zhang Jiewen	(China) Xie Zhongbo (China) Zhang Yawen
United States	(Canada) Andrew Dabeka	(United States) Lili Zhou	(United States) Howard Bach (United States) Khan Malaythong	(Chinese Taipei) Chang Li-ying (Chinese Taipei) Hung Shih-chieh	(United States) Halim Heryanto (United States) Peng Yun
Chinese Taipei	(Indonesia) Simon Santoso	(India) Saina Nehwal	(Denmark) Mathias Boe (Denmark) Carsten Mogensen	(Chinese Taipei) Chien Yu-chin (Chinese Taipei) Cheng Wen-hsing	(Indonesia) Devin Lahardi Fitriawan (Indonesia) Lita Nurlita
Macau	(Indonesia) Taufik Hidayat	(Hong Kong) Zhou Mi	(Malaysia) Koo Kien Keat (Malaysia) Tan Boon Heong	(China) Cheng Shu (China) Zhao Yunlei	(China) Xu Chen (China) Zhao Yunlei
(Germany) Bitburger	(India) Chetan Anand	(Indonesia) Maria Febe Kusumastuti	(Denmark) Mathias Boe (Denmark) Carsten Mogensen	(Denmark) Helle Nielsen (Denmark) Marie Roepke	(India) Valiyaveetil Diju (India) Jwala Gutta
Bulgaria	(Denmark) Joachim Persson	(Bulgaria) Petya Nedelcheva	(Denmark) Mathias Boe (Denmark) Carsten Mogensen	(India) Jwala Gutta (India) Shruti Kurian	(India) Valiyaveetil Diju (India) Jwala Gutta
(Netherlands) Dutch	(Indonesia) Andre Kurniawan Tedjono	(Netherlands) Yao Jie	(Indonesia) Fran Kurniawan (Indonesia) Rendra Wijaya	(Denmark) Lena Frier Kristiansen (Denmark) Kamilla Rytter Juhl	(Denmark) Joachim Fischer Nielsen (Denmark) Christinna Pedersen
Russia	(Netherlands) Dicky Palyama	(Russia) Ella Diehl	(Russia) Vitalij Durkin (Russia) Alexandr Nikolaenko	(Russia) Valeria Sorokina (Russia) Nina Vislova	(Russia) Alexandr Nikolaenko (Russia) Valeria Sorokina
New Zealand	(Malaysia) Lee Tsuen Seng	(Hong Kong) Zhou Mi	(Chinese Taipei) Chen Hung-ling (Chinese Taipei) Lin Yu-Lang	(Chinese Taipei) Chien Yu-chin (Chinese Taipei) Chou Chia-Chi	(Chinese Taipei) Chen Hung-ling (Chinese Taipei) Chou Chia-Chi
Vietnam	(Vietnam) Nguyen Tien Minh	(Singapore) Zhang Beiwen	(Malaysia) Choong Tan Fook (Malaysia) Lee Wan Wah	(Singapore) Shinta Mulia Sari (Singapore) Yao Lei	(Indonesia) Tontowi Ahmad (Indonesia) Shendy Puspa Irawati

=== Performance by country ===
Tabulated below are the Grand Prix performances based on countries. Only countries who have won a title are listed:

Team	GER	IND	THA	USA	TPE	MAC	GER	BUL	NED	RUS	NZL	VIE	Total
China		2	5			2							9
Denmark					1		2	2	2				7
Indonesia					2	1	1		2			1	7
Chinese Taipei		1		1	1						3		6
India					1		2	2					5
South Korea	5												5
Russia										4			4
Hong Kong		1				1					1		3
Malaysia						1					1	1	3
United States				3									3
Netherlands									1	1			2
Singapore												2	2
Bulgaria								1					1
Canada				1									1
Thailand		1											1
Vietnam												1	1

== Grand Prix Gold ==
India Open

- April 1–6, Kotla Vijay Bhaskar Reddy Indoor Stadium, Hyderabad, India.

Category	Winners	Runners-up	Score
Men's singles	(Thailand) Boonsak Ponsana	(India) Chetan Anand	21–16, 21–12
Women's singles	(Hong Kong) Zhou Mi	(China) Lu Lan	21–14, 21–14
Men's doubles	(China) Guo Zhendong / Xie Zhongbo	(Malaysia) Chan Chong Ming / Chew Choon Eng	19–21, 21–14, 21–12
Women's doubles	(Chinese Taipei) Chien Yu-chin / Cheng Wen-hsing	(Japan) Miyuki Maeda / Satoko Suetsuna	21–17, 21–16
Mixed doubles	(China) He Hanbin / Yu Yang	(Germany) Kristof Hopp / Birgit Overzier	21–18, 21–9

Thailand Open

- June 24–29, Nimibutr Stadium, Bangkok, Thailand.

Category	Winners	Runners-up	Score
Men's singles	(China) Lin Dan	(Thailand) Boonsak Ponsana	17–21, 21–15, 21–13
Women's singles	(China) Xie Xingfang	(China) Lu Lan	26–24, 21–7
Men's doubles	(China) Cai Yun / Fu Haifeng	(China) Guo Zhendong / Xie Zhongbo	21–17, Retired
Women's doubles	(China) Yang Wei / Zhang Jiewen	(Malaysia) Chin Eei Hui / Wong Pei Tty	15–21, 21–13, 21–13
Mixed doubles	(China) Xie Zhongbo / Zhang Yawen	(China) He Hanbin / Yu Yang	23–25, 21–10, 23–21

Chinese Taipei Open

- September 9–14, Taipei County Shinjuang Stadium, Taipei, Republic of China (Taiwan)

Category	Winners	Runners-up	Score
Men's singles	(Indonesia) Simon Santoso	(Malaysia) Roslin Hashim	21–18, 13–21, 21–10
Women's singles	(India) Saina Nehwal	(Malaysia) Lydia Cheah	21–8, 21–19
Men's doubles	(Denmark) Mathias Boe / Carsten Mogensen	(Indonesia) Candra Wijaya / (United States) Tony Gunawan	22–20, 21–14
Women's doubles	(Chinese Taipei) Chien Yu Chin / Cheng Wen-hsing	(Indonesia) Rani Mundiasti / Jo Novita	21–16, 21–17
Mixed doubles	(Indonesia) Devin Lahardi / Lita Nurlita	(Chinese Taipei) Fang Chieh-min / Cheng Wen-hsing	14–21, 21–11, 21–19

Macau Open

- September 30–October 5, Tap Seac Multi-sports Pavilion, Macau.

Category	Winners	Runners-up	Score
Men's singles	(Indonesia) Taufik Hidayat	(Malaysia) Lee Chong Wei	21–19, 21–15
Women's singles	(Hong Kong) Zhou Mi	(Malaysia) Julia Wong Pei Xian	21–13, 21–19
Men's doubles	(Malaysia) Koo Kien Keat / Tan Boon Heong	(Chinese Taipei) Fang Chieh-min / Lee Sheng-mu	21–16, 21–18
Women's doubles	(China) Cheng Shu / Zhao Yunlei	(China) Ma Jin / Wang Xiaoli	21–15, 21–18
Mixed doubles	(China) Xu Chen / Zhao Yunlei	(Hong Kong) Yohan Hadikusumo Wiratama / Chau Hoi Wah	21–15, 21–16

== Grand Prix ==
German Open

- February 26–March 2, RWE Rhein-Ruhr Sporthalle, Mülheim, Germany.

Category	Winners	Runners-up	Score
Men's singles	(South Korea) Lee Hyun-il	(Japan) Sho Sasaki	22–20, 21–5
Women's singles	(South Korea) Jun Jae-youn	(China) Wang Yihan	25–23, 21–10
Men's doubles	(South Korea) Lee Jae-jin / Hwang Ji-man	(South Korea) Jung Jae-sung / Lee Yong-dae	21–13, 21–19
Women's doubles	(South Korea) Lee Kyung-won / Lee Hyo-jung	(Japan) Miyuki Maeda / Satoko Suetsuna	21–17, 21–16
Mixed doubles	(South Korea) Lee Yong-dae / Lee Hyo-jung	(China) He Hanbin / Yu Yang	9–21, 27–25, 21–18

U.S. Open

- July 8–13, Orange County Badminton Club, Orange, California, United States.

Category	Winners	Runners-up	Score
Men's singles	(Canada) Andrew Dabeka	(Denmark) Martin Bille Larsen	21–14, 21–9
Women's singles	(United States) Lili Zhou	(Republic of Ireland) Chloe Magee	23–21, 21–16
Men's doubles	(United States) Howard Bach / Khan Malaythong	(United States) Halim Heryanto / Raju Rai	21–14, 21–19
Women's doubles	(Chinese Taipei) Chang Li-ying / Hung Shih-chieh	(Chinese Taipei) Tsai Pei-ling / Yang Chia-chen	21–19, 21–14
Mixed doubles	(United States) Halim Heryanto / Peng Yun	(Canada) Mike Beres / Valerie Loker	21–13, 21–16

Bitburger Open

- September 30–October 5, Saarlandhalle, Saarbrücken, Germany.

Category	Winners	Runners-up	Score
Men's singles	(India) Chetan Anand	(India) Arvind Bhat	23–25, 24–22, 23–21
Women's singles	(Indonesia) Maria Febe Kusumastuti	(India) Aditi Mutatkar	22–24, 21–8, 23–21
Men's doubles	(Denmark) Mathias Boe / Carsten Mogensen	(Germany) Kristof Hopp / Johannes Schöttler	21–11, 21–15
Women's doubles	(Denmark) Helle Nielsen / Marie Roepke	(Indonesia) Shendy Puspa Irawati / Meiliana Jauhari	21–15, 21–18
Mixed doubles	(India) Diju Valiyaveetil / Jwala Gutta	(Denmark) Joachim Fischer Nielsen / Christinna Pedersen	8–21, 21–17, 22–20

Bulgaria Open

- October 7–12, Sofia Hall, Sofia, Bulgaria.

Category	Winners	Runners-up	Score
Men's singles	(Denmark) Joachim Persson	(Chinese Taipei) Hsieh Yu-hsing	17–21, 21–19, 21–19
Women's singles	(Bulgaria) Petya Nedelcheva	(Indonesia) Rosaria Yusfin Pungkasari	21–14, 21–12
Men's doubles	(Denmark) Mathias Boe / Carsten Mogensen	(Indonesia) Fran Kurniawan / Wijaya Rendra	25–23, 21–16
Women's doubles	(India) Jwala Gutta / Shruti Kurian	(Indonesia) Shendy Puspa Irawati / Meiliana Jauhari	21–11, 21–19
Mixed doubles	(India) Diju V. / Jwala Gutta	(Indonesia) Fran Kurniawan / Shendy Puspa Irawati	15–21, 21–18, 21–19

Dutch Open

- October 14–19, Topsportcentrum, Almere, Netherlands.

Category	Winners	Runners-up	Score
Men's singles	(Indonesia) Andre Kurniawan Tedjono	(India) Chetan Anand	21–15, 11–21, 21–19
Women's singles	(Netherlands) Yao Jie	(Bulgaria) Linda Zechiri	21–14, 21–13
Men's doubles	(Indonesia) Fran Kurniawan / Rendra Wijaya	(India) Rupesh Kumar / Sanave Thomas	21–18, 21–18
Women's doubles	(Denmark) Lena Frier Kristiansen / Kamilla Rytter Juhl	(Indonesia) Shendy Puspa Irawati / Meiliana Jauhari	21–16, 25–23
Mixed doubles	(Denmark) Joachim Fischer Nielsen / Christinna Pedersen	(Indonesia) Fran Kurniawan / Shendy Puspa Irawati	21–17, 21–9

Russian Open

- November 4–9, Druzhba Multipurpose Arena, Moscow, Russia.

Category	Winners	Runners-up	Score
Men's singles	(Netherlands) Dicky Palyama	(Russia) Stanislav Pukhov	21–12, 21–18
Women's singles	(Russia) Ella Diehl	(Ukraine) Larisa Griga	21–10, 17–21, 21–12
Men's doubles	(Russia) Vitalij Durkin / Alexandr Nikolaenko	(Russia) Vladimir Ivanov / Ivan Sozonov	21–11, 21–15
Women's doubles	(Russia) Valeria Sorokina / Nina Vislova	(Bulgaria) Petya Nedelcheva / Dimitria Popstoykova	21–18, 21–8
Mixed doubles	(Russia) Aleksandr Nikolaenko / Valeria Sorokina	(Russia) Vitalij Durkin / Nina Vislova	21–19, 21–19

New Zealand Open

- November 11–16, North Shore Events Centre, Auckland, New Zealand.

Category	Winners	Runners-up	Score
Men's singles	(Malaysia) Lee Tsuen Seng	(Malaysia) Sairul Amar Ayob	24–22, 21–17
Women's singles	(Hong Kong) Zhou Mi	(New Zealand) Rachel Hindley	21–10, 21–15
Men's doubles	(Chinese Taipei) Chen Hung-ling / Lin Yu-Lang	(Indonesia) Fernando Kurniawan / Lingga Lie	22–20, 21–10
Women's doubles	(Chinese Taipei) Chien Yu-chin / Chou Chia-Chi	(Malaysia) Haw Chiou Hwee / Lim Pek Siah	21–8, 21–15
Mixed doubles	(Chinese Taipei) Chen Hung-ling / Chou Chia-Chi	(Chinese Taipei) Hsieh Yu-hsing / Chien Yu-chin	21–18, 22–20

Vietnam Open

- December 2–7, Phan Dinh Phung Stadium, Ho Chi Minh City, Vietnam

Category	Winners	Runners-up	Score
Men's singles	(Vietnam) Nguyen Tien Minh	(Hong Kong) Chan Yan Kit	24–22, 21–18
Women's singles	(Singapore) Zhang Beiwen	(Singapore) Xing Aiying	11–21, 21–19, 22–20
Men's doubles	(Malaysia) Choong Tan Fook / Lee Wan Wah	(Indonesia) Fran Kurniawan / Wijaya Rendra	21–14, 21–10
Women's doubles	(Singapore) Shinta Mulia Sari / Yao Lei	(Indonesia) Shendy Puspa Irawati / Meiliana Jauhari	16–21, 21–19, 21–11
Mixed doubles	(Indonesia) Tontowi Ahmad / Shendy Puspa Irawati	(Singapore) Riky Widianto / Vanessa Neo Yu Yan	21–17, 21–9
