= 2008 India Open Grand Prix Gold =

Tournament details
- Dates: 1–6 April
- Level: Grand Prix Gold
- Total prize money: US$120,000
- Venue: Kotla Vijay Bhaskar Reddy Indoor Stadium
- Location: Hyderabad, India

Champions
- Men's singles: (Thailand) Boonsak Ponsana
- Women's singles: (Hong Kong) Zhou Mi
- Men's doubles: (China) Guo Zhendong (China) Xie Zhongbo
- Women's doubles: (Chinese Taipei) Cheng Wen-hsing (Chinese Taipei) Chien Yu-chin
- Mixed doubles: (China) He Hanbin (China) Yu Yang

The 2008 India Open Grand Prix Gold was a badminton tournament that took place at Kotla Vijay Bhaskar Reddy Indoor Stadium in Hyderabad, India, from 1 to 6 April 2008, and had a total purse of $120,000.

== Men's singles ==
=== Seeds ===
1. (China) Bao Chunlai (withdrew)
2. (China) Chen Jin (second round)
3. (China) Chen Yu (quarter-finals)
4. (South Korea) Park Sung-hwan (third round)
5. (Thailand) Boonsak Ponsana (champion)
6. (Malaysia) Wong Choong Hann (third round)
7. (Japan) Shōji Satō (second round)
8. (Malaysia) Lee Tsuen Seng (second round)

=== Finals ===
Quarter-finals
(Chinese Taipei) Liao Sheng-shiun	22	14	14
5	(Thailand) Boonsak Ponsana	20	21	21
(Japan) Sho Sasaki	21	13	21
(China) Lü Yi	17	21	14
(India) Chetan Anand	21	22
3	(China) Chen Yu	16	20
(India) Anand Pawar	18	19
(England) Andrew Smith	21	21

Semi-finals
5	(Thailand) Boonsak Ponsana	19	21	21
(Japan) Sho Sasaki	21	14	15
(India) Chetan Anand	21	21
(England) Andrew Smith	6	9

Final
5	(Thailand) Boonsak Ponsana	21	21
(India) Chetan Anand	16	12

== Women's singles ==
=== Seeds ===
1. (China) Xie Xingfang (withdrew)
2. (China) Lu Lan (final)
3. (China) Zhu Lin (semi-finals)
4. (Germany) Xu Huaiwen (withdrew)
5. (Malaysia) Wong Mew Choo (withdrew)
6. (Hong Kong) Zhou Mi (champion)
7. (Hong Kong) Yip Pui Yin (quarter-finals)
8. (Japan) Eriko Hirose (semi-finals)

=== Finals ===
Semi-finals
8	(Japan) Eriko Hirose	21	12	12
6	(Hong Kong) Zhou Mi	18	21	21
3	(China) Zhu Lin	21	7	10
2	(China) Lu Lan	17	21	21

Final
6	(Hong Kong) Zhou Mi	21	21
2	(China) Lu Lan	14	14

== Men's doubles ==
=== Seeds ===
1. (South Korea) Jung Jae-sung / Lee Yong-dae (semi-finals)
2. (United States) Tony Gunawan / (Indonesia) Candra Wijaya (semi-finals)
3. (South Korea) Hwang Ji-man / Lee Jae-jin (first round)
4. (Japan) Shintaro Ikeda / Shuichi Sakamoto (withdrew)
5. (China) Guo Zhendong / Xie Zhongbo (champion)
6. (Japan) Keita Masuda / Tadashi Ōtsuka (quarter-finals)
7. (Indonesia) Hendra Aprida Gunawan / Joko Riyadi (withdrew)
8. (Hong Kong) Albertus Susanto Njoto / Yohan Hadikusumo Wiratama (quarter-finals)

=== Finals ===
Semi-finals
1	(South Korea) Jung Jae-sung (South Korea) Lee Yong-dae	21	9	18
5	(China) Guo Zhendong (China) Xie Zhongbo	19	21	21
(Malaysia) Chan Chong Ming (Malaysia) Chew Choon Eng	21	9	21
2	(United States) Tony Gunawan (Indonesia) Candra Wijaya	18	21	19

Final
5	(China) Guo Zhendong (China) Xie Zhongbo	19	21	21
(Malaysia) Chan Chong Ming (Malaysia) Chew Choon Eng	21	14	12

== Women's doubles ==
=== Seeds ===
1. (Chinese Taipei) Cheng Wen-hsing / Chien Yu-chin (champion)
2. (Japan) Miyuki Maeda / Satoko Suetsuna (final)
3. (Singapore) Jiang Yanmei / Li Yujia (quarter-finals)
4. (Japan) Aki Akao / Tomomi Matsuda (second round)

=== Finals ===
Semi-finals
1	(Chinese Taipei) Cheng Wen-hsing (Chinese Taipei) Chien Yu-chin	21	21
(Singapore) Shinta Mulia Sari (Singapore) Yao Lei	13	17
(Poland) Kamila Augustyn (Poland) Nadieżda Kostiuczyk	18	17
2	(Japan) Miyuki Maeda (Japan) Satoko Suetsuna	21	21

Final
1	(Chinese Taipei) Cheng Wen-hsing (Chinese Taipei) Chien Yu-chin	21	21
2	(Japan) Miyuki Maeda (Japan) Satoko Suetsuna	17	16

== Mixed doubles ==
=== Seeds ===
1. (China) He Hanbin / Yu Yang (champion)
2. (Thailand) Sudket Prapakamol / Saralee Thungthongkam (quarter-finals)
3. (Poland) Robert Mateusiak / Nadieżda Kostiuczyk (semi-finals)
4. (Germany) Kristof Hopp / Birgit Overzier (finals)
5. (Indonesia) Devin Lahardi Fitriawan / Lita Nurlita (second round)
6. (Germany) Ingo Kindervater / Kathrin Piotrowski (first round)

=== Finals ===
Semi-finals
1	(China) He Hanbin (China) Yu Yang	21	21
4	(Poland) Robert Mateusiak (Poland) Nadieżda Kostiuczyk	14	19
6	(Germany) Kristof Hopp (Germany) Birgit Overzier	21	22
(Chinese Taipei) Fang Chieh-min (Chinese Taipei) Cheng Wen-hsing	19	20

Final
1	(China) He Hanbin (China) Yu Yang	21	21
6	(Germany) Kristof Hopp (Germany) Birgit Overzier	18	9
