= Xiao Luxi =

Singaporean badminton player

Xiao Luxi 肖露茜
Personal information
- Born: 19 July 1982 (age 44) Fujian, China
- Height: 1.78 m (5 ft 10 in)

Sport
- Country: Singapore
- Sport: Badminton
- Handedness: Right
- BWF profile
Medal record
Women's badminton
Representing Singapore
Asian Championships
| Bronze medal – third place | 2002 Bangkok | Women's singles |
Southeast Asian Games
| Gold medal – first place | 2003 Ho Chi Minh | Women's team |
| Bronze medal – third place | 2003 Ho Chi Minh | Women's doubles |

Xiao Luxi (born 19 July 1982) is a Singaporean former badminton player.

== Early life ==
In 1997, she came from China as a 14-year-old, and together with Li Li, Frances Liu and Rong Muxi, were Singapore badminton's pioneer batch of foreign talent.

== Career ==
Xiao was the first of the quartet to make a mark internationally, partnering Liu Zhen to victory at the 2001 Hong Kong Open. That was Singapore's first win on the Grand Prix circuit, and the duo once climbed as high as 11th in the world. Her best result in singles was third place at the 2002 Asian Badminton Championships, when she scalped China's then-world No 20 Hu Ting. In 2003, she won Singapore first ever women's badminton team gold at the 2003 Southeast Asian Games that was held in Vietnam's Ho Chi Minh City.

She quit the national team in 2004 and returned to Fujian Province, China.

== Achievements ==
=== Asian Championships ===
Women's doubles
| Year | Venue | Opponent | Score | Result |
|---|---|---|---|---|
| 2002 | Nimibutr Stadium; Bangkok, Thailand | (China) Zhou Mi | 0–11, 1–11 | Bronze |

=== Southeast Asian Games ===
Women's doubles
| Year | Venue | Partner | Opponent | Score | Result |
|---|---|---|---|---|---|
| 2003 | Tan Binh Sport Center; Ho Chi Minh City, Vietnam | (Singapore) Jiang Yanmei | (Indonesia) Eny Erlangga (Indonesia) Liliyana Natsir | 0–2 | Bronze |

=== IBF Grand Prix ===
The World Badminton Grand Prix was sanctioned by the International Badminton Federation from 1983 to 2006.

Women's doubles
| Year | Tournament | Partner | Opponent | Score | Result |
|---|---|---|---|---|---|
| 2006 | Hong Kong Open | (Singapore) Liu Zhen | (Thailand) Sathinee Chankrachangwong (Thailand) Saralee Thungthongkam | 8–6, 3–7, 2–7, 8–7, 7–3 | (gold) Winner |

=== IBF International ===
Women's singles
| Year | Tournament | Opponent | Score | Result |
|---|---|---|---|---|
| 2001 | Smiling Fish Satellite | (Singapore) Liu Zhen | 3–11, 4–11 | (silver) Runner-up |
| 2002 | Singapore Satellite | (Singapore) Li Li | 7–11, 11–9, 9–11 | (silver) Runner-up |
