= Frances Liu =

Singaporean badminton player

Liu Fan 刘帆
Personal information
- Born: 1 April 1984 (age 42) Liaoning, China
- Height: 1.71 m (5 ft 7 in)
- Weight: 61 kg (134 lb)

Sport
- Country: Singapore
- Sport: Badminton
- Handedness: Right
- BWF profile
Medal record
Women's badminton
Representing Singapore
Asian Games
Bronze medal – third place	2006 Doha	Women's team
Southeast Asian Games
Gold medal – first place	2003 Ho Chi Minh	Women's team
Silver medal – second place	2007 Nakhon Ratchasima	Women's team
Silver medal – second place	2005 Manila	Women's team
Bronze medal – third place	2009 Vientiane	Women's team

Frances Liu Fan (born 1 April 1984) is a Singaporean badminton player. Together with Li Li, Xiao Luxi and Rong Muxi, they were Singapore badminton's pioneer batch of foreign talents under the Foreign Sports Talent Scheme.

== Career ==
Liu won Singapore first ever women's badminton team gold at the 2003 Southeast Asian Games that was held in Vietnam's Ho Chi Minh City. She retired from her playing career in 2011 and in 2014, became Singapore national badminton (singles) coach. As of 2025, she has been the senior coach of the Badminton Junior Performance Programme at Singapore Sports School.

== Achievements ==
=== IBF Grand Prix ===
The World Badminton Grand Prix was sanctioned by the International Badminton Federation from 1983 to 2006.

Mixed doubles
Year	Tournament	Partner	Opponent	Score	Result
2006	New Zealand Open	(Singapore) Hendra Wijaya	(Singapore) Hendri Saputra (Singapore) Li Yujia	11–21, 12–21	(silver) Runner-up

=== BWF International Challenge/Series ===
Women's singles
Year	Tournament	Opponent	Score	Result
2001	Malaysia Satellite	(Malaysia) Woon Sze Mei	7–0, 7–4, 6–8	(gold) Winner

Women's doubles
Year	Tournament	Partner	Opponent	Score	Result
2005	Iran Fajr International	(Singapore) Shinta Mulia Sari	(Iran) Golnaz Faezi (Iran) Behnaz Perzamanbin	15–8, 15–0	(gold) Winner
2005	Croatian International	(Singapore) Shinta Mulia Sari	(Singapore) Zhang Beiwen (Singapore) Fu Mingtian	Walkover	(gold) Winner
2007	Ballarat International	(Singapore) Yao Lei	(Singapore) Shinta Mulia Sari (Singapore) Vanessa Neo	21–14, 17–21, 15–21	(silver) Runner-up
2007	Waikato International	(Singapore) Yao Lei	(Singapore) Shinta Mulia Sari (Singapore) Vanessa Neo	21–11, 18–21, 21–17	(gold) Winner
2008	Vietnam International	(Singapore) Vanessa Neo	(Singapore) Shinta Mulia Sari (Singapore) Yao Lei	21–15, 18–21, 21–16	(gold) Winner

Mixed doubles
Year	Tournament	Partner	Opponent	Score	Result
2004	Mauritius International	(Singapore) Denny Setiawan	(Singapore) Kendrick Lee (Singapore) Li Yujia	6–15, 5–15	(silver) Runner-up
2005	Croatian International	(Singapore) Hendra Wijaya	(Slovenia) Andrej Pohar (Slovenia) Maja Pohar	15–11, 13–15, 15–7	(gold) Winner

BWF International Challenge tournament
BWF International Series tournament
