= Chang Kim Wai =

Malaysian badminton player and coach

Chang Kim Wai 郑锦威
Personal information
- Born: 17 August 1976 (age 50) Perak, Malaysia
- Years active: 1996-2003
- Height: 1.76 m (5 ft 9 in)

Sport
- Country: Malaysia
- Sport: Badminton
- Handedness: Left
- Event: Men's doubles

Men's doubles
- BWF profile
Medal record
Men's badminton
Representing Malaysia
Thomas Cup
Silver medal – second place	2002 Guangzhou	Men's team
Commonwealth Games
Silver medal – second place	2002 Manchester	Men's doubles
Asian Games
Bronze medal – third place	2002 Busan	Men's team
Southeast Asian Games
Silver medal – second place	2003 Ho Chi Minh	Men's doubles
Bronze medal – third place	2003 Ho Chi Minh	Men's team

Chang Kim Wai (born 17 August 1976) is a former badminton player from Malaysia and coach.

== Achievements ==
=== Southeast Asian Games ===
Men's Doubles
Year	Venue	Partner	Opponent	Score	Result
2003	Tan Binh Sport Center, Ho Chi Minh City, Vietnam	(Malaysia) Chew Choon Eng	(Malaysia) Choong Tan Fook (Malaysia) Lee Wan Wah	5–15, 6–15	Silver

=== Commonwealth Games ===
Men's doubles
Year	Venue	Partner	Opponent	Score	Result
2002	Bolton Arena, Manchester, England	(Malaysia) Choong Tan Fook	(Malaysia) Chan Chong Ming (Malaysia) Chew Choon Eng	5–7, 7–4, 7–2, 5–7, 3–7	Silver

=== IBF World Grand Prix ===
The World Badminton Grand Prix sanctioned by International Badminton Federation (IBF) from 1983 to 2006.

Men's doubles
Year	Tournament	Partner	Opponent	Score	Result
2000	Polish Open	(Malaysia) Hong Chieng Hun	(Bulgaria) Mihail Popov (Bulgaria) Svetoslav Stoyanov	13–15, 15–5, 15–5	(gold) Winner
2002	Malaysia Open	(Malaysia) Choong Tan Fook	(China) Liu Yong (China) Chen Qiqiu	14–17, 3–15	(silver) Runner-up
