= Badminton at the 2002 Commonwealth Games =

- Venue: Bolton Arena
- Location: Bolton, England
- Dates: 25 July – 4 August 2002

Badminton at the 2002 Commonwealth Games was the tenth appearance of Badminton at the Commonwealth Games, Competition took place in Bolton, England, from 25 July to 4 August 2002.

The badminton events took place at the Bolton Arena. There were no bronze medal play off matches because both losing semi-finalists were awarded a bronze medal. This was the only time that the scoring system of 7 points / 5 sets was used for a Commonwealth Games badminton event.

Malaysia topped the badminton medal table by virtue of winning three gold medals.

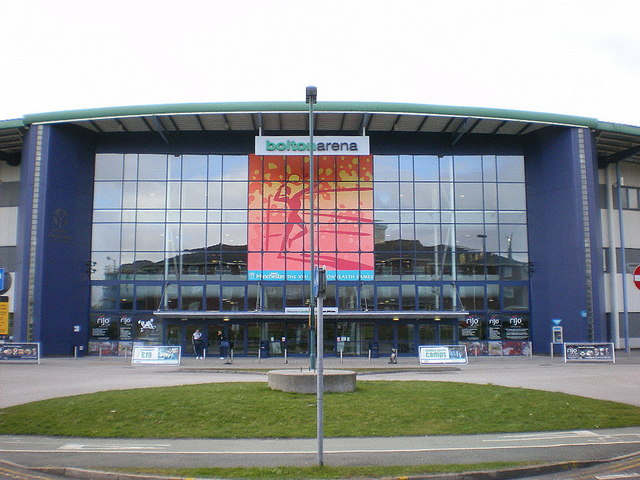
Bolton Arena

== Medal table ==
Rank	Nation	Gold	Silver	Bronze	Total
1	Malaysia (MAS)	3	3	3	9
2	England (ENG)*	2	1	4	7
3	Singapore (SIN)	1	1	0	2
4	New Zealand (NZL)	0	1	2	3
5	India (IND)	0	0	1	1
5	Scotland (SCO)	0	0	1	1
5	Wales (WAL)	0	0	1	1
Totals (7 entries)		6	6	12	24

== Medallists ==
Category	Gold	Silver	Bronze	
Men's singles	(Malaysia) Muhammad Hafiz Hashim	(Malaysia) Lee Tsuen Seng	(Malaysia) Wong Choong Hann	(Wales) Richard Vaughan
Women's singles	(Singapore) Li Li	(England) Tracey Hallam	(Malaysia) Ng Mee Fen	(India) Aparna Popat
Men's doubles	(Malaysia) Chan Chong Ming; Chew Choon Eng	(Malaysia) Chang Kim Wai; Choong Tan Fook	(England) Nathan Robertson; Anthony Clark	(England) Simon Archer; James Anderson
Women's doubles	(Malaysia) Ang Li Peng; Lim Pek Siah	(New Zealand) Nicole Gordon; Sara Petersen	(England) Gail Emms; Joanne Goode	(Malaysia) Chin Eei Hui; Wong Pei Tty
Mixed doubles	(England) Simon Archer; Joanne Goode	(Malaysia) Chew Choon Eng; Chin Eei Hui	(New Zealand) Daniel Shirley; Sara Petersen	(England) Anthony Clark; Sara Sankey
Mixed team	England	Singapore	New Zealand	Scotland

== Final results ==
Category	Gold	Silver	Score
Men's singles	(Malaysia) Muhammad Hafiz Hashim	(Malaysia) Lee Tsuen Seng	7-3, 7-1, 3-7, 7-8 7-4
Women's singles	(Singapore) Li Li	(England) Tracey Hallam	7-5, 5-7, 8-7, 7-0
Men's doubles	(Malaysia) Chan Chong Ming & Chew Choon Eng	(Malaysia) Chang Kim Wai & Choong Tan Fook	7-5, 4-7, 2-7, 7-5, 7-3
Women's doubles	(Malaysia) Ang Li Peng & Lim Pek Siah	(New Zealand) Nicole Gordon & Sara Petersen	7-8, 7-4, 2-7, 7-5, 7-0
Mixed doubles	(England) Simon Archer & Joanne Goode	(Malaysia) Chew Choon Eng & Chin Eei Hui	0-7, 7-5 7-3, 7-3
Mixed team	England	Singapore	3-0

== Results ==
=== Men's singles ===
Round of 16
(Malaysia) Muhammad Hafiz Hashim	7	7	7
(Australia) Stuart Brehaut	0	0	1
(New Zealand) Nick Hall	8	4	8	7
(England) Mark Constable	6	7	6	1
(Malaysia) Wong Choong Hann	7	7	7
(New Zealand) John Gordon	0	2	2
(India) Pullela Gopichand	7	7	7
(Canada) Stephan Wojcikiewicz	0	1	1
(Malaysia) Lee Tsuen Seng	7	4	7	4	7
(India) Nikhil Kanetkar	3	7	4	7	5
(New Zealand) Geoffrey Bellingham	7	7	7
(Sri Lanka) Dinuka Karunaratne	3	3	1
(Wales) Richard Vaughan	6	7	8	3	7
(Singapore) Ronald Susilo	8	2	6	7	1
(India) Abhinn Shyam Gupta	8	7	7
(England) Colin Haughton	6	5	3

Quarter-finals
(Malaysia) Hafiz	8	7	7
(New Zealand) Hall	6	4	4
(Malaysia) Hann	7	7	7
(India) Pullela	1	1	4
(Malaysia) Seng	7	7	7
(New Zealand) Bellingham	4	0	2
(Wales) Vaughan	7	7	3	7
(India) Gupta	4	1	7	3

Semi-finals
(Malaysia) Hafiz	6	8	7	7	7
(Malaysia) Hann	8	6	0	8	3
(Malaysia) Seng	7	7	7
(Wales) Vaughan	4	0	1

Final
(Malaysia) Hafiz	7	7	3	7	7
(Malaysia) Seng	3	1	7	8	4

=== Women's singles ===
Round of 16
(Singapore) Li Li	7	7	7
(Canada) Kara Solmundson	1	1	3
(Wales) Kelly Morgan	7	7	7
(India) B. R. Meenakshi	3	3	1
(Malaysia) Ng Mee Fen	5	7	7	4	7
(India) Trupti Murgunde	7	2	3	7	2
(England) Julia Mann	7	7	7
(Scotland) Fiona Sneddon	1	3	1
(England) Tracey Hallam	7	7	7
(Northern Ireland) Lisa Lynas	1	1	1
(Scotland) Susan Hughes	7	8	7
(Sri Lanka) R. C. Hettiarachchige	0	7	0
(India) Aparna Popat	7	7	7
(Mauritius) Amrita Sawaram	0	1	0
(Canada) Denyse Julien	5	7	7	7
(New Zealand) Nicole Gordon	7	4	3	4

Quarter-finals
(Singapore) Li	7	7	4	7
(Wales) Morgan	4	4	7	4
(Malaysia) Ng	2	7	7	7
(England) Mann	7	2	2	5
(England) Hallam	2	5	7	7	8
(Scotland) Hughes	7	7	5	0	6
(India) Popat	7	7	7
(Canada) Julien	1	0	0

Semi-finals
(Singapore) Li	7	7	7
(Malaysia) Ng	3	0	1
(England) Hallam	7	7	7
(India) Popat	3	3	1

Final
(Singapore) Li	7	5	8	7
(England) Hallam	5	7	7	0

=== Men's doubles ===
Quarterfinals
(Malaysia) Chan Chong Ming (Malaysia) Chew Choon Eng	7	7	7
(Canada) Keith Chan (Canada) William Milroy	4	1	1
(Australia) Peter Blackburn (Australia) Murray Hocking	7	5	6	1
(England) James Anderson (England) Simon Archer	3	7	8	7
(India) Sanave Thomas (India) Valiyaveetil Diju	1	4	6
(England) Anthony Clark (England) Nathan Robertson	7	7	8
(Malaysia) Chang Kim Wai (Malaysia) Choong Tan Fook	8	7	7	7
(New Zealand) John Gordon (New Zealand) Daniel Shirley	7	8	3	2

Semifinals
(Malaysia) Chan (Malaysia) Chew	7	7	7
(England) Anderson (England) Archer	4	5	2
(England) Clark (England) Robertson	5	3	4
(Malaysia) Chang (Malaysia) Choong	8	7	7

Final
(Malaysia) Chan (Malaysia) Chew	7	4	2	7	7
(Malaysia) Chang (Malaysia) Choong	5	7	7	5	3

=== Women's doubles ===
Quarterfinals
(Malaysia) Ang Li Peng (Malaysia) Lim Pek Siah	7	7	7
(Canada) Denyse Julien (Canada) Tammy Sun	0	1	4
(England) Gail Emms (England) Joanne Goode	7	7	4	7
(Singapore) Fatimah Kumin Lim (Singapore) Jiang Yanmei	4	5	7	1
(New Zealand) Nicole Gordon (New Zealand) Sara Petersen	6	7	7	3	7
(Scotland) Elinor Middlemiss (Scotland) Kirsteen McEwan	8	3	5	7	4
(Malaysia) Chin Eei Hui (Malaysia) Wong Pei Tty	4	1	7	7	7
(Wales) Felicity Gallup (Wales) Jo Muggeridge	7	7	1	0	4

Semifinals
(Malaysia) Peng (Malaysia) Siah	7	6	8	7
(England) Emms (England) Goode	4	8	6	4
(New Zealand) Gordon (New Zealand) Petersen	7	7	7
(Malaysia) Chin (Malaysia) Wong	3	3	3

Final
(Malaysia) Peng (Malaysia) Siah	7	7	2	7	7
(New Zealand) Gordon (New Zealand) Petersen	8	4	7	5	0

=== Mixed doubles ===
Quarterfinals
(England) Simon Archer (England) Joanne Goode	7	7	7
(Singapore) Patrick Lau Kim Pong (Singapore) Jiang Yanmei	2	0	3
(New Zealand) Daniel Shirley (New Zealand) Sara Petersen	7	4	7	7
(Scotland) Russell Hogg (Scotland) Kirsteen McEwan	2	7	3	1
(Malaysia) Chew Choon Eng (Malaysia) Chin Eei Hui	7	8	1	7
(England) Nathan Robertson (England) Gail Emms	5	6	7	4
(England) Anthony Clark (England) Sara Sankey	7	7	7
(Canada) William Milroy (Canada) Denyse Julien	4	4	1

Semifinals
(England) Archer (England) Goode	7	5	8	4	7
(New Zealand) Shirley (New Zealand) Petersen	1	7	6	7	2
(Malaysia) Eng (Malaysia) Hui	4	3	7	7	7
(England) Clark (England) Sankey	7	7	4	4	0

Final
(England) Archer (England) Goode	0	7	7	7
(Malaysia) Eng (Malaysia) Hui	7	5	3	3

=== Mixed Team ===
==== Semi finals ====
Team One	Team Two	Score
Singapore	New Zealand	3-1

Team One	Team Two	Score
England	Scotland	3-0
Colin Haughton	Gaham Simpson	7–1, 4–7, 7–0, 7–1
Joanne Goode & Gail Emms	Yuan Wemyss & Sandra Watt	7–4, 7–2, 7–5
Tracey Hallam	Susan Hughes	7–3, 8–6, 7–2

==== Final ====
Team One	Team Two	Score
England	Singapore	3-0
Nathan Robertson & Gail Emms	Patrick Lau Kim Pong & Jiang Yanmei	7-0, 7-4, 7-4
Colin Haughton	Ronald Susilo	5-7, 7-4, 7-0, 0-7, 7-3
Tracey Hallam	Li Li	6-8, 7-4, 1-7, 7-1, 7-1
