= Badminton at the 2003 SEA Games =

- Venue: Tan Binh Sport Center
- Date: 6–12 December 2003
- Nations: 8

The badminton tournament at the 2003 SEA Games was held from December 6 to December 12 in Tan Binh Sport Center, Ho Chi Minh City of Vietnam.

== Medalists ==
Event	Gold	Silver	Bronze
Men's singles	Sony Dwi Kuncoro; Indonesia	Wong Choong Hann; Malaysia	Roslin Hashim; Malaysia
Men's singles	Sony Dwi Kuncoro; Indonesia	Wong Choong Hann; Malaysia	Ronald Susilo; Singapore
Women's singles	Wong Mew Choo; Malaysia	Salakjit Ponsana; Thailand	Li Li; Singapore
Women's singles	Wong Mew Choo; Malaysia	Salakjit Ponsana; Thailand	Jiang Yanmei; Singapore
Men's doubles	Malaysia; Choong Tan Fook; Lee Wan Wah	Malaysia; Chew Choon Eng; Chang Kim Wai	Thailand; Sudket Prapakamol; Patapol Ngernsrisuk
Men's doubles	Malaysia; Choong Tan Fook; Lee Wan Wah	Malaysia; Chew Choon Eng; Chang Kim Wai	Indonesia; Luluk Hadiyanto; Alvent Yulianto
Women's doubles	Indonesia; Lita Nurlita; Jo Novita	Indonesia; Eny Erlangga; Liliyana Natsir	Malaysia; Chin Eei Hui; Wong Pei Tty
Women's doubles	Indonesia; Lita Nurlita; Jo Novita	Indonesia; Eny Erlangga; Liliyana Natsir	Singapore; Jiang Yanmei; Xiao Luxi
Mixed doubles	Thailand; Sudket Prapakamol; Saralee Thungthongkam	Indonesia; Anggun Nugroho; Eny Widiowati	Philippines; Kennevic Asuncion; Kennie Asuncion
Mixed doubles	Thailand; Sudket Prapakamol; Saralee Thungthongkam	Indonesia; Anggun Nugroho; Eny Widiowati	Malaysia; Chew Choon Eng; Chin Eei Hui
Men's teams	Indonesia; Sony Dwi Kuncoro; Simon Santoso; Wimpie Mahardi; Luluk Hadiyanto; Alvent Yulianto; Markis Kido; Hendra Setiawan; Anggun Nugroho	Thailand; Boonsak Ponsana; Anuphap Theeraratsakul; Patapol Ngernsrisuk; Sudket Prapakamol; Pramote Teerawiwatana; Tesana Panvisvas; Adisak Wirayapadongpong	Singapore; Ronald Susilo; Kendrick Lee; Gerard Ho; Alvin Fu; Khoo Kian Teck; Chua Yong Joo; Philip Phua; Aaron Tan
Men's teams	Indonesia; Sony Dwi Kuncoro; Simon Santoso; Wimpie Mahardi; Luluk Hadiyanto; Alvent Yulianto; Markis Kido; Hendra Setiawan; Anggun Nugroho	Thailand; Boonsak Ponsana; Anuphap Theeraratsakul; Patapol Ngernsrisuk; Sudket Prapakamol; Pramote Teerawiwatana; Tesana Panvisvas; Adisak Wirayapadongpong	Malaysia; Wong Choong Hann; Roslin Hashim; Lee Chong Wei; Choong Tan Fook; Lee Wan Wah; Chew Choon Eng; Chang Kim Wai
Women's team	Singapore; Li Li; Jiang Yanmei; Xiao Luxi; Frances Liu; Tan Li Si	Thailand; Salakjit Ponsana; Monthila Meemek; Saralee Thungthongkam; Duanganong Aroonkesorn; Kunchala Voravichitchaikul; Soratja Chansrisukot; Sitee Prucksapaisarnsilp	Indonesia; Maria Kristin Yulianti; Silvi Antarini; Fransisca Ratnasari; Jo Novita; Lita Nurlita; Eny Erlangga; Liliyana Natsir; Eny Widiowati
Women's team	Singapore; Li Li; Jiang Yanmei; Xiao Luxi; Frances Liu; Tan Li Si	Thailand; Salakjit Ponsana; Monthila Meemek; Saralee Thungthongkam; Duanganong Aroonkesorn; Kunchala Voravichitchaikul; Soratja Chansrisukot; Sitee Prucksapaisarnsilp	Vietnam; Lê Ngọc Nguyên Nhung; Hà Thị Kim Nhân; Nguyễn Thị Thanh Tâm; Vũ Thị Thảo; Trần Thị Thanh Thảo; Nguyễn Thị Phương Thảo; Thái Thị Hồng Gấm; Nguyen Thi Thu Thao; Nguyễn Thị Phương Thảo

=== Final results ===
Category	Winners	Runners-up	Score
Men's singles	(Indonesia) Sony Dwi Kuncoro	(Malaysia) Wong Choong Hann	15–8, 15–5
Women's singles	(Malaysia) Wong Mew Choo	(Thailand) Salakjit Ponsana	11–5, 11–5
Men's doubles	(Malaysia) Choong Tan Fook & Lee Wan Wah	(Malaysia) Chew Choon Eng & Chang Kim Wai	15–6, 15–5
Women's doubles	(Indonesia) Lita Nurlita & Jo Novita	(Indonesia) Eny Erlangga & Liliyana Natsir	15–13, 11–15, 15–7
Mixed doubles	(Thailand) Sudket Prapakamol & Saralee Thungthongkam	(Indonesia) Anggun Nugroho & Eny Widiowati	15–12, 15–7

== Results ==
=== Men's team ===
Quarter-final; 6 December
Indonesia (INA)	5
Laos (LAO)	0
Vietnam (VIE)	2
Singapore (SIN)	3
Philippines (PHI)	1
Thailand (THA)	4

Semi-Final; 7 December
Malaysia (MAS)	2
Indonesia (INA)	3
Singapore (SIN)	1
Thailand (THA)	4

Final; 8 December
Indonesia (INA)	3
Thailand (THA)	1

==== Quarter-final ====
6 December	Indonesia (INA)	5–0	Laos (LAO)

Sony Dwi Kuncoro	2–0	Bounhadet Donuong	15-2, 15-5
Simon Santoso	2–0	Lhou Thamazy	15-0, 15-0
Wimpie Mahardi	2–0	Khamsy Sirimok	15-0, 15-0
Luluk Hadiyanto / Alvent Yulianto	2–0	Ekkasay Meongoha / Yothin Rassavaong	15-4, 15-1
Markis Kido / Hendra Setiawan	2–0	Khamsy Sirimok / Bouangeon Sengdara	15-1, 15-7

6 December	Vietnam (VIE)	2–3	Singapore (SIN)

6 December	Philippines (PHI)	1–4	Thailand (THA)

==== Semi-final ====
7 December	Malaysia (MAS)	2–3	Indonesia (INA)

Wong Choong Hann	0–2	Sony Dwi Kuncoro	10-15, 7-15
Lee Wan Wah / Choong Tan Fook	0–2	Luluk Hadiyanto / Alvent Yulianto	12-15, 5-15
Roslin Hashim	1–2	Simon Santoso	8-15, 17-14, 11-15
Chew Choon Eng / Chang Kim Wai	2–1	Markis Kido / Hendra Setiawan	10-15, 15-8, 15-9
Lee Chong Wei	2–0	Wimpie Mahardi	15-10, 15-7

7 December	Singapore (SIN)	1–4	Thailand (THA)

Ronald Susilo	2–1	Boonsak Ponsana	14-17, 15-4, 15-10

==== Final ====
8 December	Indonesia (INA)	3–1	Thailand (THA)

Sony Dwi Kuncoro	0–2	Boonsak Ponsana	13-15, 2-15
Luluk Hadiyanto / Alvent Yulianto	2–0	Patapol Ngernsrisuk / Sudket Prapakamol	15-9, 15-13
Simon Santoso	2–0	Anuphap Theeraratsakul	15-7, 15-3
Markis Kido / Hendra Setiawan	2–0	Pramote Teerawiwatana / Boonsak Ponsana	15-5, 15-5

=== Women's team ===
Quarter-final; 6 December
Vietnam (VIE)	3
Philippines (PHI)	2

Semi-Final; 7 December
Singapore (SIN)	5
Vietnam (VIE)	0
Indonesia (INA)	2
Thailand (THA)	3

Final; 8 December
Singapore (SIN)	3
Thailand (THA)	2

==== Quarter-final ====
6 December	Vietnam (VIE)	3–2	Philippines (PHI)

==== Semi-final ====
7 December	Singapore (SIN)	5–0	Vietnam (VIE)

7 December	Indonesia (INA)	2–3	Thailand (THA)

Maria Kristin Yulianti	1–2	Salakjit Ponsana	4-11, 11-9, 12-13
Silvi Antarini	2–0	Monthila Meemek	11-6, 11-1
Fransisca Ratnasari	1–2	Saralee Thungthongkam	13-10, 6-11, 0-11
Jo Novita / Lita Nurlita	2–0	Salakjit Ponsana / Duanganong Aroonkesorn	15-7, 15-10
Eny Erlangga / Liliyana Natsir	0–2	Saralee Thungthongkam / Kunchala Voravichitchaikul	14-17, 8-15

==== Final ====
8 December	Singapore (SIN)	3–2	Thailand (THA)

Li Li	2–1	Salakjit Ponsana	8-11, 11-8, 11-5
Xiao Luxi	1–2	Saralee Thungthongkam	8-11, 11-6, 3-11
Jiang Yanmei	2–0	Kunchala Voravichitchaikul	11-1, 11-2
Li Li / Xiao Luxi	0–2	Salakjit Ponsana / Saralee Thungthongkam	10-15, 7-15
Jiang Yanmei / Frances Liu	2–0	Duanganong Aroonkesorn / Kunchala Voravichitchaikul	15-10, 15-7

=== Men's singles ===
Round of 16; 10 December
Sony Dwi Kuncoro (INA)	15	15
Gerald Ho (SIN)	7	3
Nguyễn Tiến Minh (VIE)	9	3
Boonsak Ponsana (THA)	15	15
Roslin Hashim (MAS)	15	15
Kennevic Asuncion (PHI)	7	5
Deng Titrasmey (CAM)	15	15
Panyasiri Somsanit (LAO)	7	9
Mcuanevongsa Sathin (LAO)	2	2
Lloyd Escoses (PHI)	15	15
Sam Bunnarith (CAM)	1	1
Ronald Susilo (SIN)	15	15
Simon Santoso (INA)	11	15	15
Anuphap Theeraratsakul (THA)	15	6	0
Nguyễn Quang Minh (VIE)	3	7
Wong Choong Hann (MAS)	15	15

Quarterfinal; 11 December
Sony Dwi Kuncoro (INA)	15	15
Boonsak Ponsana (THA)	8	9
Roslin Hashim (MAS)	15	15
Deng Titrasmey (CAM)	0	1
Lloyd Escoses (PHI)	8	5
Ronald Susilo (SIN)	15	15
Simon Santoso (INA)	6	12
Wong Choong Hann (MAS)	15	15

Semifinal; 11 December
Sony Dwi Kuncoro (INA)	15	15
Roslin Hashim (MAS)	8	1
Ronald Susilo (SIN)	3	15	9
Wong Choong Hann (MAS)	15	7	15

Final; 12 December
Sony Dwi Kuncoro (INA)	15	15
Wong Choong Hann (MAS)	8	5

=== Women's singles ===
Round of 16; 10 December
Monthila Meemek (THA)	11	11
Hà Thị Kim Nhân (VIE)	4	3
Kennie Asuncion (PHI)	9	5
Silvi Antarini (INA)	11	11
Lê Ngọc Nguyên Nhung (VIE)	4	4
Fransisca Ratnasari (INA)	11	11

Quarterfinal; 11 December
Li Li (SIN)	11	11
Monthila Meemek (THA)	4	7
Wong Mew Choo (MAS)	11	11
Silvi Antarini (INA)	5	5
Fransisca Ratnasari (INA)	4	7
Jiang Yanmei (SIN)	11	11
Paula Lynn Obañana (PHI)	6	12
Salakjit Ponsana (THA)	11	11

Semifinal; 11 December
Li Li (SIN)	9	4
Wong Mew Choo (MAS)	11	11
Jiang Yanmei (SIN)	7	1
Salakjit Ponsana (THA)	11	11

Final; 12 December
Wong Mew Choo (MAS)	11	11
Salakjit Ponsana (THA)	5	5

=== Men's doubles ===
Round of 16; 10 December
Chew Choon Eng (MAS); Chang Kim Wai (MAS)	15	15
Sengdara Bouangeun (LAO); Sirimouk Khamsey (LAO)	9	5
Luluk Hadiyanto (INA); Alvent Yulianto (INA)	15	15
Trần Thanh Hải (VIE); Bùi Quang Sơn (VIE)	7	8
Philip Phua (SIN); Aaron Tan (SIN)	5	7
Kennevic Asuncion (PHI); Melvin Llanes (PHI)	15	15
Deng Titrasmey (CAM); Sam Bunnarith (CAM)	1	1
Chua Yong Joo (SIN); Khoo Kian Teck (SIN)	15	15
Ian Gil Piencennaves (PHI); Arolas Amahit (PHI)	8	5
Patapol Ngernsrisuk (THA); Sudket Prapakamol (THA)	15	15
Meungchaileun Ekkasay (LAO); Rathsavong Yothin (LAO)	1	0
Markis Kido (INA); Hendra Setiawan (INA)	15	15
Nguyễn Quang Minh (VIE); Nguyễn Tiến Minh (VIE)	4	1
Lee Wan Wah (MAS); Choong Tan Fook (MAS)	15	15

Quarterfinal; 11 December
Pramote Teerawiwatana (THA); Tesana Panvisvas (THA)	9	9
Chew Choon Eng (MAS); Chang Kim Wai (MAS)	15	15
Luluk Hadiyanto (INA); Alvent Yulianto (INA)	15	15
Kennevic Asuncion (PHI); Melvin Llanes (PHI)	6	5
Chua Yong Joo (SIN); Khoo Kian Teck (SIN)	1	12
Patapol Ngernsrisuk (THA); Sudket Prapakamol (THA)	15	15
Markis Kido (INA); Hendra Setiawan (INA)	5	7
Lee Wan Wah (MAS); Choong Tan Fook (MAS)	15	15

Semifinal; 11 December
Chew Choon Eng (MAS); Chang Kim Wai (MAS)	11	15	15
Luluk Hadiyanto (INA); Alvent Yulianto (INA)	15	13	9
Patapol Ngernsrisuk (THA); Sudket Prapakamol (THA)	5	2
Lee Wan Wah (MAS); Choong Tan Fook (MAS)	15	15

Final; 12 December
Chew Choon Eng (MAS); Chang Kim Wai (MAS)	5	6
Lee Wan Wah (MAS); Choong Tan Fook (MAS)	15	15

=== Women's doubles ===
Round of 16; 10 December
Kunchala Voravichitchaikul (THA); Duanganong Aroonkesorn (THA)	2
Nguyễn Thị Thanh Tâm (VIE); Nguyen Thi Thu Thao (VIE)	0
Li Li (SIN); Frances Liu (SIN)	2
Raquel Guerrero (PHI); Rachel Guerrero (PHI)	0
Lê Ngọc Nguyên Nhung (VIE); Vũ Thị Thảo (VIE)	0
Kennie Asuncion (PHI); Paula Lynn Obañana (PHI)	2

Quarterfinal; 11 December
Jo Novita (INA); Lita Nurlita (INA)	13	17	15
Kunchala Voravichitchaikul (THA); Duanganong Aroonkesorn (THA)	15	16	5
Chin Eei Hui (MAS); Wong Pei Tty (MAS)	15	15
Li Li (SIN); Frances Liu (SIN)	5	8
Kennie Asuncion (PHI); Paula Lynn Obañana (PHI)	7	6
Eny Erlangga (INA); Liliyana Natsir (INA)	15	15
Jiang Yanmei (SIN); Xiao Luxi (SIN)	15	15
Soratja Chansrisukot (THA); Sitee Prucksapaisarnsilp (THA)	8	2

Semifinal; 11 December
Jo Novita (INA); Lita Nurlita (INA)	2
Chin Eei Hui (MAS); Wong Pei Tty (MAS)	1
Eny Erlangga (INA); Liliyana Natsir (INA)	2
Jiang Yanmei (SIN); Xiao Luxi (SIN)	0

Final; 12 December
Jo Novita (INA); Lita Nurlita (INA)	15	11	15
Eny Erlangga (INA); Liliyana Natsir (INA)	13	15	7

=== Mixed doubles ===
Round of 16; 10 December
Nguyễn Huy Giang (VIE); Nguyen Thi Thu Thao (VIE)	7	3
Alvent Yulianto (INA); Liliyana Natsir (INA)	15	15
Alvin Fu (SIN); Tan Li Si (SIN)	2	2
Lee Wan Wah (MAS); Wong Pei Tty (MAS)	15	15
Kendrick Lee (SIN); Frances Liu (SIN)	10	15	15
Adisak Wirayapadongpong (THA); Soratja Chansrisukot (THA)	15	3	6
Melvin Llanes (PHI); Paula Lynn Obañana (PHI)	6	3
Trần Thanh Hải (VIE); Nguyễn Thị Thanh Tâm (VIE)	15	15

Quarterfinal; 11 December
Sudket Prapakamol (THA); Saralee Thungthongkam (THA)	15	10	15
Alvent Yulianto (INA); Liliyana Natsir (INA)	5	15	10
Kennevic Asuncion (PHI); Kennie Asuncion (PHI)	15	15
Lee Wan Wah (MAS); Wong Pei Tty (MAS)	11	10
Kendrick Lee (SIN); Frances Liu (SIN)	7	1
Chew Choon Eng (MAS); Chin Eei Hui (MAS)	15	15
Trần Thanh Hải (VIE); Nguyễn Thị Thanh Tâm (VIE)	1	14
Anggun Nugroho (INA); Eny Widyowati (INA)	15	17

Semifinal; 11 December
Sudket Prapakamol (THA); Saralee Thungthongkam (THA)	2
Kennevic Asuncion (PHI); Kennie Asuncion (PHI)	0
Chew Choon Eng (MAS); Chin Eei Hui (MAS)	0(r)
Anggun Nugroho (INA); Eny Widyowati (INA)	2

Final; 12 December
Sudket Prapakamol (THA); Saralee Thungthongkam (THA)	15	15
Anggun Nugroho (INA); Eny Widyowati (INA)	12	7

== Medal table ==
(Host nation in bold.)

* Host nation (Vietnam)

Rank	Nation	Gold	Silver	Bronze	Total
1	Indonesia	3	2	2	7
2	Malaysia	2	2	4	8
3	Thailand	1	3	1	5
4	Singapore	1	0	5	6
5	Philippines	0	0	1	1
5	**Vietnam**	0	0	1	1
Totals (6 entries)		7	7	14	28

Preceded by 2001	Badminton at the SEA Games; 2003 SEA Games	Succeeded by 2005
