= Jo Novita =

Indonesian badminton player (born 1981)

Personal information
- Born: 19 November 1981 (age 44) Jakarta, Indonesia
- Height: 1.58 m (5 ft 2 in)
- Weight: 56 kg (123 lb)

Sport
- Country: Indonesia
- Sport: Badminton

Women's doubles
- Highest ranking: 9 with Greysia Polii (2006)
Medal record
Women's badminton
Representing Indonesia
Sudirman Cup
Silver medal – second place	2005 Beijing	Mixed team
Uber Cup
Silver medal – second place	2008 Jakarta	Women's team
Asian Championships
Bronze medal – third place	2001 Manila	Women's doubles
Bronze medal – third place	2003 Jakarta	Women's doubles
Bronze medal – third place	2005 Hyderabad	Women's doubles
SEA Games
Gold medal – first place	2001 Kuala Lumpur	Women's team
Gold medal – first place	2003 Ho Chi Minh	Women's doubles
Gold medal – first place	2007 Nakhon Ratchasima	Women's team
Silver medal – second place	2005 Manila	Women's doubles
Silver medal – second place	2007 Nakhon Ratchasima	Women's doubles
Bronze medal – third place	2003 Ho Chi Minh	Women's team
Bronze medal – third place	2005 Manila	Women's team
Asian Junior Championships
Silver medal – second place	1999 Yangon	Girls' team

Jo Novita (born 19 November 1981) is an Indonesian former badminton player. She won gold medals in the women's doubles at the Southeast Asian Games in 2003, and in the team event in 2001 and 2007. She won the World Grand Prix tournament title in Thailand and Philippines Open. Novita also competed at the 2004 Summer Olympics and 2006 Asian Games.

== Career ==
At the 2004 Summer Olympics, she was partnered with partner Lita Nurlita in the women's doubles. They had a bye in the first round and were defeated by Yang Wei and Zhang Jiewen of China in the round of 16. She was a partner with Greysia Polii on the Indonesian Uber Cup (women's international) team which finished second to China in the 2008 series. In October 2008, she teamed with Rani Mundiasti in women's doubles to become runner-up at the Denmark Super Series after losing to the Malaysian pair of Chin Eei Hui and Wong Pei Tty in the final.

== Personal life ==
Novita married her teammate from Tangkas club Ronne Maykel Runtulalo, in Jakarta, 2 August 2009. She later moved to Canada, and joined her husband who had already been a coach at Flying badminton Centre in Vancouver, British Columbia.

== Achievements ==
=== Asian Championships ===
Women's doubles
Year	Venue	Partner	Opponent	Score	Result
2001	PhilSports Arena; Manila, Philippines	(Indonesia) Eny Erlangga	(China) Gao Ling (China) Huang Sui	5–15, 3–15	Bronze
2003	Tennis Indoor Gelora Bung Karno; Jakarta, Indonesia	(Indonesia) Lita Nurlita	(South Korea) Hwang Yu-mi (South Korea) Lee Hyo-jung	3–15, 8–15	Bronze
2005	Gachibowli Indoor Stadium; Hyderabad, India	(Indonesia) Greysia Polii	(Japan) Kumiko Ogura (Japan) Reiko Shiota	10–15, 4–15	Bronze

=== SEA Games ===
Women's doubles
Year	Venue	Partner	Opponent	Score	Result
2003	Tan Binh Sport Center; Ho Chi Minh City, Vietnam	(Indonesia) Lita Nurlita	(Indonesia) Eny Erlangga (Indonesia) Liliyana Natsir	15–13, 11–15, 15–7	Gold
2005	PhilSports Arena; Metro Manila, Philippines	(Indonesia) Greysia Polii	(Malaysia) Chin Eei Hui (Malaysia) Wong Pei Tty	12–15, 15–9, 13–15	Silver
2007	Wongchawalitkul University; Nakhon Ratchasima, Thailand	(Indonesia) Greysia Polii	(Indonesia) Vita Marissa (Indonesia) Liliyana Natsir	15–21, 14–21	Silver

=== BWF Superseries (1 runner-up) ===
The BWF Superseries, which was launched on 14 December 2006 and implemented in 2007, was a series of elite badminton tournaments, sanctioned by the Badminton World Federation (BWF). BWF Superseries levels were Superseries and Superseries Premier. A season of Superseries consisted of twelve tournaments around the world that had been introduced since 2011. Successful players were invited to the Superseries Finals, which were held at the end of each year.

Women's doubles
Year	Tournament	Partner	Opponent	Score	Result
2008	Denmark Open	(Indonesia) Rani Mundiasti	(Malaysia) Chin Eei Hui (Malaysia) Wong Pei Tty	21–23, 12–21	(silver) Runner-up

BWF Super Series tournament

=== BWF Grand Prix (3 titles, 3 runners-up) ===
The BWF Grand Prix had two levels, the Grand Prix and Grand Prix Gold. It was a series of badminton tournaments sanctioned by the Badminton World Federation (BWF) and played between 2007 and 2017. The World Badminton Grand Prix was sanctioned by the International Badminton Federation from 1983 to 2006.

Women's doubles
Year	Tournament	Partner	Opponent	Score	Result
2001	Thailand Open	(Indonesia) Eny Erlangga	(Malaysia) Norhasikin Amin (Malaysia) Wong Pei Tty	7–4, 5–7, 7–0, 7–2	(gold) Winner
2004	Chinese Taipei Open	(Indonesia) Lita Nurlita	(Chinese Taipei) Cheng Wen-hsing (Chinese Taipei) Chien Yu-chin	4–15, 6–15	(silver) Runner-up
2006	Philippines Open	(Indonesia) Greysia Polii	(Indonesia) Rani Mundiasti (Indonesia) Endang Nursugianti	21–16, 21–13	(gold) Winner
2006	Korea Open	(Indonesia) Greysia Polii	(China) Yang Wei (China) Zhang Jiewen	10–21, 11–21	(silver) Runner-up
2008	Chinese Taipei Open	(Indonesia) Rani Mundiasti	(Chinese Taipei) Cheng Wen-hsing (Chinese Taipei) Chien Yu-chin	16–21, 17–21	(silver) Runner-up

Mixed doubles
Year	Tournament	Partner	Opponent	Score	Result
2001	Thailand Open	(Indonesia) Candra Wijaya	(Indonesia) Ronne Maykel Runtolalu (Indonesia) Eny Widiowati	8–6, 7–1, 8–7	(gold) Winner

BWF Grand Prix Gold tournament
BWF Grand Prix tournament

== Performance timeline ==
=== Indonesian team ===
- Junior level

Team event	1999
Asian Junior Championships	Silver

- Senior level

Team event	2001	2003	2005	2007
Southeast Asian Games	Gold	Bronze	Bronze	Gold

Team event	2008
Uber Cup	Silver

Team event	2005
Sudirman Cup	Silver

=== Individual competitions ===
- Senior level

Event	2003	2005	2007
Southeast Asian Games	Gold	Silver	Silver

Event	2001	2003	2005
Asian Championships	Bronze	Bronze	Bronze

Tournament	BWF Superseries		Best
Tournament	2007	2008	Best
Korea Open		R1	F (2006)
Denmark Open		F	F (2008)
Super Series Finals	—N/a	SF	SF (2008)

Tournament	IBF Grand Prix						BWF Grand Prix and Grand Prix Gold		Best
Tournament	2001	2002	2003	2004	2005	2006	2007	2008	Best
Chinese Taipei Open	—N/a			F			A	F	F (2004, 2008)
Korea Open						F	SS		F (2006)
Philippines Open	—N/a					W		—N/a	W (2006)
Thailand Open	W (WD); W (XD)	—N/a							W (2001 WD, XD)
