= Jiang Yanmei =

Jiang Yanmei 江彦媚
Personal information
- Born: 26 February 1981 (age 45) Guangdong, China
- Height: 1.71 m (5 ft 7 in)
- Weight: 55 kg (121 lb)

Sport
- Country: Singapore
- Sport: Badminton
- Handedness: Right

Women's singles & doubles
- Highest ranking: 7 (WD)
- BWF profile
Medal record
Women's badminton
Representing Singapore
Commonwealth Games
Silver medal – second place	2002 Manchester	Mixed team
Silver medal – second place	2006 Melbourne	Women's doubles
Asian Games
Bronze medal – third place	2006 Doha	Women's team
SEA Games
Gold medal – first place	2003 Vietnam	Women's team
Silver medal – second place	2005 Manila	Women's team
Silver medal – second place	2007 Nakhon Ratchasima	Women's team
Bronze medal – third place	2003 Vietnam	Women's singles
Bronze medal – third place	2003 Vietnam	Women's doubles
Bronze medal – third place	2005 Manila	Women's doubles
Bronze medal – third place	2007 Nakhon Ratchasima	Women's doubles

Jiang Yanmei (Chinese: 江彦媚; born 28 February 1981) is a Chinese-born Singaporean badminton player. She competed at the 2004 and 2008 Summer Olympics; 2002 and 2006 Commonwealth Games; and also 2006 Asian Games.

== Early life ==
Born in Guangdong, China, Jiang moved to Singapore in 1999, and joining the national squad shortly after under the Foreign Sports Talent Scheme.

== Career ==
Jiang was part of Singapore women's team that won the gold medal at the 2003 SEA Games, and bronze medal at 2006 Asian Games. She also helps the Singapore mixed team to win bronze at the 2002 Manchester Commonwealth Games. Teamed-up with Li Yujia, they won the women's doubles silver medal at the 2006 Melbourne Commonwealth Games, losing the final to Malaysian pair Chin Eei Hui and Wong Pei Tty.

After her playing career, Jiang became a coach with the Singapore Badminton Association. In 2017, she was appointed as the principal of the SBA Badminton Academy at Pasir Ris Sports Hall, which was established to help enhance the abilities of local players in Singapore.

== Awards ==
Jiang received the 2005 Meritorious Award from the Singapore National Olympic Committee.

== Achievements ==
=== Commonwealth Games ===
Women's doubles
Year	Venue	Partner	Opponent	Score	Result
2006	Melbourne Convention and Exhibition Centre; Melbourne, Australia	(Singapore) Li Yujia	(Malaysia) Chin Eei Hui (Malaysia) Wong Pei Tty	17–21, 19–21	Silver

=== Southeast Asian Games ===
Women's singles
Year	Venue	Opponent	Score	Result
2003	Tan Binh Sport Center; Ho Chi Minh City, Vietnam	(Thailand) Salakjit Ponsana	7–11, 1–11	Bronze

Women's doubles
Year	Venue	Partner	Opponent	Score	Result
2003	Tan Binh Sport Center; Ho Chi Minh City, Vietnam	(Singapore) Xiao Luxi	(Indonesia) Eny Erlangga (Indonesia) Liliyana Natsir	0–2	Bronze
2005	PhilSports Arena; Metro Manila, Philippines	(Singapore) Li Yujia	(Malaysia) Chin Eei Hui (Malaysia) Wong Pei Tty	8–15, 12–15	Bronze
2007	Wongchawalitkul University; Nakhon Ratchasima, Thailand	(Singapore) Li Yujia	(Indonesia) Vita Marissa (Indonesia) Liliyana Natsir	21–17, 13–21, 13–21	Bronze

=== BWF Grand Prix ===
The BWF Grand Prix had two levels, the Grand Prix and Grand Prix Gold. It was a series of badminton tournaments sanctioned by the Badminton World Federation (BWF) and played between 2007 and 2017. The World Badminton Grand Prix was sanctioned by the International Badminton Federation from 1983 to 2006.

Women's doubles
Year	Tournament	Partner	Opponent	Score	Result
2006	Bitburger Open	(Singapore) Li Yujia	(Indonesia) Rani Mundiasti (Indonesia) Endang Nursugianti	21–11, 21–19	(gold) Winner
2006	New Zealand Open	(Singapore) Li Yujia	(Malaysia) Lim Pek Siah (Malaysia) Joanne Quay	21–11, 19–21, 21–15	(gold) Winner

=== International Series/Satellite ===
Women's singles
Year	Tournament	Opponent	Score	Result
2000	Smiling Fish Satellite	(Singapore) Fatimah Kumin Lim	11–5, 11–6	(gold) Winner
2003	Singapore Satellite	(Singapore) Li Li	1–11, 5–11	(silver) Runner-up
2004	Iran Fajr International	(Singapore) Li Li	9–11, 8–11	(silver) Runner-up
2004	Finnish International	(Singapore) Li Li	11–4, 11–4	(gold) Winner
2004	Croatian International	(Singapore) Li Li	1–11, 12–13	(silver) Runner-up
2004	Mauritius International	(Hong Kong) Ling Wan Ting	10–13, 4–11	(silver) Runner-up

Women's doubles
Year	Tournament	Partner	Opponent	Score	Result
2000	Smiling Fish Satellite	(Singapore) Fatimah Kumin Lim	(Thailand) Sathinee Chankrachangwong (Thailand) Thitikan Duangsiri	15–10, 16–17, 13–15	(silver) Runner-up
2003	Singapore Satellite	(Singapore) Li Yujia	(Malaysia) Norhasikin Amin (Malaysia) Fong Chew Yen	15–8, 15–1	(gold) Winner
2003	India Satellite	(Singapore) Li Yujia	(Thailand) Duanganong Aroonkesorn (Thailand) Kunchala Voravichitchaikul	15–9, 15–11	(gold) Winner
2004	Iran Fajr International	(Singapore) Li Yujia	(Japan) Yoshiko Iwata (Japan) Miyuki Tai	15–4, 15–12	(gold) Winner
2004	Croatian International	(Singapore) Li Yujia	(Singapore) Shinta Mulia Sari (Singapore) Xing Aiying	15–4, 15–1	(gold) Winner
2004	Mauritius International	(Singapore) Li Yujia	(Hong Kong) Koon Wai Chee (Hong Kong) Li Wing Mui	12–15, 15–5, 15–9	(gold) Winner
2005	Cheers Asian Satellite	(Singapore) Li Yujia	(South Korea) Ha Jung-eun (South Korea) Kim Min-jung	15–3, 15–1	(gold) Winner

Mixed doubles
Year	Tournament	Partner	Opponent	Score	Result
2000	Smiling Fish Satellite	(Singapore) Hendri Kurniawan Saputra	(China) Tao Xiaoqiang (China) Tao Xiaolan	8–15, 15–17	(silver) Runner-up
