= Li Li (badminton) =

Chinese-born Singaporean badminton player (born 1983)

Li Li 李理
Personal information
- Born: 7 July 1983 (age 43) Wuhan, China
- Height: 1.60 m (5 ft 3 in)
- Weight: 51 kg (112 lb)

Sport
- Country: Singapore
- Sport: Badminton
- Handedness: Right
- BWF profile
Medal record
Women's badminton
Representing Singapore
Commonwealth Games
Gold medal – first place	2002 Manchester	Women's singles
Silver medal – second place	2002 Manchester	Mixed team
Asian Games
Bronze medal – third place	2006 Doha	Women's team
SEA Games
Gold medal – first place	2003 Vietnam	Women's team
Silver medal – second place	2005 Manila	Women's team
Silver medal – second place	2007 Nakhon Ratchasima	Women's team
Bronze medal – third place	2003 Vietnam	Women's singles
Bronze medal – third place	2005 Manila	Women's singles

Li Li (Chinese: 李理; pinyin: Lǐ Lǐ; born 7 July 1983) is a Chinese-born Singaporean badminton player.

== Early life ==
Li was born in Wuhan, China and moved to Singapore in 1997. She became a Singapore citizen in 2002.

== Career ==
Li won the 2002 Commonwealth Games women's singles gold medal by beating favourite Tracey Hallam of England in four sets, causing a major upset for the home team. It was the first Commonwealth Games badminton gold for Singapore.

Li was part of the women's team at the 2003 Southeast Asian Games which won the gold medal. Li also played at the 2004 Summer Olympics, losing to Gong Ruina of China in the round of 32. At the 2006 Asian Games, she was part of the women's team which took the bronze medal.

Li resigned from the Singapore Badminton Association in January 2008 and returned to Wuhan.

== Awards ==
Li received the 2003 and 2005 Meritorious Award from the Singapore National Olympic Committee.

== Achievements ==
=== Commonwealth Games ===
Women's singles
Year	Venue	Opponent	Score	Result
2002	Bolton Arena; Manchester, England	(England) Tracey Hallam	7–5, 5–7, 8–7, 7–0	Gold

=== SEA Games ===
Women's singles
Year	Venue	Opponent	Score	Result
2003	Tan Binh Sport Center; Ho Chi Minh City, Vietnam	(Malaysia) Wong Mew Choo	9–11, 4–11	Bronze
2005	PhilSports Arena, Metro Manila, Philippines	(Malaysia) Wong Mew Choo	2–11, 8–11	Bronze

=== BWF International Challenge/Series ===
Women's singles
Year	Tournament	Opponent	Score	Result
1997	Spanish International	(Slovenia) Maja Pohar	7–11, 7–11	(silver) Runner-up
1999	Myanmar International	(Singapore) Fatimah Kumin Lim	11–9, 11–1	(gold) Winner
2001	Singapore International	(China) Huang Lipei	11–3, 9–11, 11–5	(gold) Winner
2002	Singapore Satellite	(Singapore) Xiao Luxi	11–7, 9–11, 11–9	(gold) Winner
2003	Singapore Satellite	(Singapore) Jiang Yanmei	11—1, 11–5	(gold) Winner
2004	Iran Fajr International	(Singapore) Jiang Yanmei	11–9, 11–8	(gold) Winner
2004	Finnish International	(Singapore) Jiang Yanmei	4–11, 4–11	(silver) Runner-up
2004	Croatian International	(Singapore) Jiang Yanmei	11–1, 13–12	(gold) Winner
2004	Singapore Satellite	(Thailand) Salakjit Ponsana	6—11, 11–6, 11–9	(gold) Winner
2005	Iran Fajr International	(Singapore) Shinta Mulia Sari	11–9, 11–0	(gold) Winner
2005	Cheers Asian Satellite	(Singapore) Xing Aiying	11–7, 9–11, 11–5	(gold) Winner

Women's doubles
Year	Tournament	Partner	Opponent	Score	Result
1999	Myanmar International	(Singapore) Fatimah Kumin Lim	(Myanmar) Thida Zan Moe (Myanmar) Mar Oo Swee	15–7, 15–10	(gold) Winner

Mixed doubles
Year	Tournament	Partner	Opponent	Score	Result
1999	Myanmar International	(Singapore) Aman Santosa	(Myanmar) Thida Zan Moe (Myanmar) Win Zaw	12–15, 15–7, 15–6	(gold) Winner
