= Eny Erlangga =

Indonesian badminton player (born 1981)

Personal information
- Born: 2 April 1981 (age 45)

Sport
- Country: Indonesia
- Sport: Badminton
- Handedness: Right
- Event: Women's & mixed doubles

Women's & mixed doubles
- BWF profile
Medal record
Women's badminton
Representing Indonesia
Asian Championships
| Bronze medal – third place | 2001 Manila | Women's doubles |
Southeast Asian Games
| Gold medal – first place | 2001 Kuala Lumpur | Women's team |
| Silver medal – second place | 2003 Ho Chi Minh | Women's doubles |
| Bronze medal – third place | 2003 Ho Chi Minh | Women's team |
Asian Junior Championships
| Gold medal – first place | 1999 Yangon | Mixed doubles |
| Silver medal – second place | 1999 Yangon | Girls' team |

Eny Erlangga (born 2 April 1981) is a former Indonesian badminton player. She was the gold medalist at the 1999 Asian Junior Championships in the mixed doubles event partnered with Hendri Kurniawan Saputra, also clinched the silver medal in the girls' team event. She was part of the Indonesia women's team that won the gold medal at the 2001 Southeast Asian Games. She won a Grand Prix title at the 2001 Thailand Open in the women's doubles event with Jo Novita.

== Achievements ==
=== Asian Championships ===
Women's doubles
| Year | Venue | Partner | Opponent | Score | Result |
|---|---|---|---|---|---|
| 2001 | PhilSports Arena; Manila, Philippines | (Indonesia) Jo Novita | (China) Gao Ling (China) Huang Sui | 5–15, 3–15 | Bronze |

=== Southeast Asian Games ===
Women's doubles
| Year | Venue | Partner | Opponent | Score | Result |
|---|---|---|---|---|---|
| 2003 | Tan Binh Sport Center; Ho Chi Minh City, Vietnam | (Indonesia) Liliyana Natsir | (Indonesia) Jo Novita (Indonesia) Lita Nurlita | 13–15, 15–11, 7–15 | Silver |

=== Asian Junior Championships ===
Mixed doubles
| Year | Venue | Partner | Opponent | Score | Result |
|---|---|---|---|---|---|
| 1999 | National Indoor Stadium – 1 Yangon, Myanmar | (Indonesia) Hendri Kurniawan Saputra | (China) Zheng Bo (China) Wei Yili | 15–12, 17–16 | Gold |

=== IBF World Grand Prix ===
The World Badminton Grand Prix has been sanctioned by the International Badminton Federation from 1983 to 2006.

Women's doubles
| Year | Tournament | Partner | Opponent | Score | Result |
|---|---|---|---|---|---|
| 2001 | Thailand Open | (Indonesia) Jo Novita | (Malaysia) Norhasikin Amin (Malaysia) Wong Pei Tty | 7–4, 5–7, 7–0, 7–2 | (gold) Winner |
