= Chou Chia-chi =

Taiwanese badminton player

Chou Chia-chi 周佳琦
Personal information
- Born: 21 August 1983 (age 43)
- Height: 1.64 m (5 ft 5 in)
- Weight: 58 kg (128 lb)

Sport
- Country: Taiwan
- Sport: Badminton
- Handedness: Right

Women's & mixed doubles
- Highest ranking: 33 (WD November 2009); 16 (XD November 2008)
- BWF profile
Medal record
Women's badminton
Representing Chinese Taipei
Uber Cup
Bronze medal – third place	2006 Sendai & Tokyo	Women's team
Asian Junior Championships
Bronze medal – third place	2000 Kyoto	Girls' team
Bronze medal – third place	1999 Yangon	Girls' team

Chou Chia-chi (Chinese: 周佳琦; pinyin: Zhōu Jiāqí; Wade–Giles: Chou Chia-ch'i; born 21 August 1983) is a Taiwanese badminton player. Chou was part of the Taiwan national women's team that won the bronze medal at the 2006 Uber Cup in Japan. At the same year she participated at the Asian Games in Doha, Qatar. She competed at the 2007 World Championships in the women's doubles event partnered with Ku Pei-ting, and finished in the quarterfinals round. In 2008, she won double title in the women's and mixed doubles event at the New Zealand Open.

== Personal life ==
In January 2011, Chou married to a former Taiwan national badminton player, Hu Chung-shien.

== Achievements ==
=== BWF Grand Prix ===
The BWF Grand Prix has two levels: Grand Prix and Grand Prix Gold. This series of badminton tournaments has been sanctioned by the Badminton World Federation (BWF) since 2007.

Women's doubles
Year	Tournament	Partner	Opponent	Score	Result
2008	New Zealand Open	(Chinese Taipei) Chien Yu-chin	(Malaysia) Haw Chiou Hwee (Malaysia) Lim Pek Siah	21–8, 21–15	(gold) Winner

Mixed doubles
Year	Tournament	Partner	Opponent	Score	Result
2008	New Zealand Open	(Chinese Taipei) Chen Hung-ling	(Chinese Taipei) Hsieh Yu-hsin (Chinese Taipei) Chien Yu-chin	21–18, 22–20	(gold) Winner

BWF Grand Prix Gold tournament
BWF Grand Prix tournament

=== BWF International Challenge/Series ===
Women's doubles
Year	Tournament	Partner	Opponent	Score	Result
2010	Kaohsiung International	(Chinese Taipei) Tsai Pei-ling	(Thailand) Rodjana Chuthabunditkul (Thailand) Wiranpatch Hongchookeat	21–11, 21–12	(gold) Winner

Mixed doubles
Year	Tournament	Partner	Opponent	Score	Result
2008	Australian International	(Chinese Taipei) Chen Hung-ling	(Japan) Noriyasu Hirata (Japan) Shizuka Matsuo	21–16, 21–4	(gold) Winner
2008	Canadian International	(Chinese Taipei) Chen Hung-ling	(China) Zhang Lei (China) Hu Minyu	21–8, 21–11	(gold) Winner

BWF International Challenge tournament
BWF International Series tournament
