= Chew Choon Eng =

Malaysian badminton player (born 1976)

Chew Choon Eng 邹俊英
Personal information
- Born: 28 May 1976 (age 50) Penang, Malaysia
- Years active: 1994–2010
- Height: 1.74 m (5 ft 9 in)
- Weight: 70 kg (154 lb)

Sport
- Country: Malaysia
- Sport: Badminton
- Handedness: Right

Men's & mixed doubles
- Highest ranking: 1 (11 April 2002)
Medal record
Men's badminton
Representing Malaysia
World Championships
| Bronze medal – third place | 2001 Seville | Men's doubles |
Thomas Cup
| Silver medal – second place | 2002 Guangzhou | Men's team |
| Bronze medal – third place | 2006 Sendai/Tokyo | Men's team |
Commonwealth Games
| Gold medal – first place | 2002 Manchester | Men's doubles |
| Silver medal – second place | 2002 Manchester | Mixed doubles |
Asian Games
| Bronze medal – third place | 2002 Busan | Men's doubles |
| Bronze medal – third place | 2002 Busan | Men's team |
Asian Championships
| Bronze medal – third place | 1997 Kuala Lumpur | Men's doubles |
| Bronze medal – third place | 2004 Kuala Lumpur | Men's doubles |
Asia Cup
| Silver medal – second place | 1999 Ho Chi Minh | Men's team |
SEA Games
| Gold medal – first place | 1999 Bandar Seri Begawan | Mixed doubles |
| Gold medal – first place | 2001 Kuala Lumpur | Men's team |
| Silver medal – second place | 1997 Jakarta | Men's team |
| Silver medal – second place | 1999 Bandar Seri Begawan | Men's team |
| Silver medal – second place | 2003 Vietnam | Men's doubles |
| Bronze medal – third place | 1997 Jakarta | Mixed doubles |
| Bronze medal – third place | 2001 Kuala Lumpur | Men's doubles |
| Bronze medal – third place | 2001 Kuala Lumpur | Mixed doubles |
| Bronze medal – third place | 2003 Vietnam | Mixed doubles |
| Bronze medal – third place | 2003 Vietnam | Men's team |

Chew Choon Eng
- Traditional Chinese: 鄒俊英
- Simplified Chinese: 邹俊英
Transcriptions
Standard Mandarin
- Hanyu Pinyin: Cháo Zūnyīng
Yue: Cantonese
- Jyutping: Zau1 Zeon3 Jing1
Southern Min
- Hokkien POJ: Chau Chùn-eng
- Tâi-lô: Tsau Tsùn-ing

Chew Choon Eng (born 28 May 1976) is a Malaysian former badminton player. He was a gold medalists at the 2002 Commonwealth Games in the men's doubles event, also at the 1999 and 2001 SEA Games in the mixed doubles and men's team events respectively. Chew also won the bronze medal at the World Championships in 2001. He reached a career high as world number 1 in the men's doubles on 11 April 2002.

== Career ==
Chew won the World Grand Prix tournament in 2002 Japan Open. He competed in badminton at the 2004 Summer Olympics in men's doubles with a partner Chan Chong Ming. They defeated Theodoros Velkos and George Patis of Greece in the first round, then were defeated in the round of 16 by Zheng Bo and Sang Yang of China.

Chew was coaching Malaysian professional pair consist of 2016 Olympic Games silver medallist, Chan Peng Soon and Goh Liu Ying and Goh V Shem and Tan Wee Kiong.

== Achievements ==
=== World Championships ===
Men's doubles
| Year | Venue | Partner | Opponent | Score | Result |
|---|---|---|---|---|---|
| 2001 | Palacio de Deportes de San Pablo; Seville, Spain | (Malaysia) Chan Chong Ming | (Indonesia) Tony Gunawan (Indonesia) Halim Haryanto | 15–12, 5–15, 3–15 | Bronze |

=== Commonwealth Games ===
Men's doubles
| Year | Venue | Partner | Opponent | Score | Result |
|---|---|---|---|---|---|
| 2002 | Bolton Arena; Manchester, England | (Malaysia) Chan Chong Ming | (Malaysia) Chang Kim Wai (Malaysia) Choong Tan Fook | 7–5, 4–7, 2–7, 7–5, 7–3 | Gold |

Mixed doubles
| Year | Venue | Partner | Opponent | Score | Result |
|---|---|---|---|---|---|
| 2002 | Bolton Arena; Manchester, England | (Malaysia) Chin Eei Hui | (England) Simon Archer (England) Joanne Goode | 7–0, 5–7, 3–7, 3–7 | Silver |

=== Asian Games ===
Men's doubles
| Year | Venue | Partner | Opponent | Score | Result |
|---|---|---|---|---|---|
| 2002 | Gangseo Gymnasium; Busan, South Korea | (Malaysia) Chan Chong Ming | (South Korea) Lee Dong-soo (South Korea) Yoo Yong-sung | 16–17, 12–15 | Bronze |

=== Asian Championships ===
Men's doubles
| Year | Venue | Partner | Opponent | Score | Result |
|---|---|---|---|---|---|
| 1997 | Stadium Negara; Kuala Lumpur, Malaysia | (Malaysia) Lee Chee Leong | (Malaysia) Choong Tan Fook (Malaysia) Lee Wan Wah | 13–15, 12–15 | Bronze |
| 2004 | Kuala Lumpur Badminton Stadium; Kuala Lumpur, Malaysia | (Malaysia) Chan Chong Ming | (Indonesia) Sigit Budiarto (Indonesia) Tri Kusharjanto | 8–15, 9–15 | Bronze |

=== SEA Games ===
Men's doubles
| Year | Venue | Partner | Opponent | Score | Result |
|---|---|---|---|---|---|
| 2001 | Malawati Stadium; Selangor, Malaysia | (Malaysia) Chan Chong Ming | (Indonesia) Tony Gunawan (Indonesia) Bambang Suprianto | 15–9, 3–15, 4–15 | Bronze |
| 2003 | Tan Binh Sport Center; Ho Chi Minh City, Vietnam | (Malaysia) Chang Kim Wai | (Malaysia) Choong Tan Fook (Malaysia) Lee Wan Wah | 5–15, 6–15 | Silver |

Mixed doubles
| Year | Venue | Partner | Opponent | Score | Result |
|---|---|---|---|---|---|
| 1997 | Asia-Africa hall, Gelora Bung Karno Sports Complex; Jakarta, Indonesia | (Malaysia) Ang Li Peng | (Malaysia) Cheah Soon Kit (Malaysia) Norhasikin Amin | 15–8, 17–14 | Bronze |
| 1999 | Hassanal Bolkiah Sports Complex; Bandar Seri Begawan, Brunei | (Malaysia) Chor Hooi Yee | (Malaysia) Rosman Razak (Malaysia) Norhasikin Amin | 12–15, 15–6, 15–7 | Gold |
| 2001 | Malawati Stadium; Selangor, Malaysia | (Malaysia) Wong Pei Tty | (Indonesia) Nova Widianto (Indonesia) Vita Marissa | 2–15, 8–15 | Bronze |
| 2003 | Tan Binh Sport Center; Ho Chi Minh City, Vietnam | (Malaysia) Chin Eei Hui | (Indonesia) Anggun Nugroho (Indonesia) Eny Widyowati | 0–2, retired | Bronze |

=== IBF World Grand Prix ===
The World Badminton Grand Prix sanctioned by International Badminton Federation (IBF) since 1983 to 2006. The BWF Grand Prix has two levels, the Grand Prix Gold and Grand Prix. It is a series of badminton tournaments, sanctioned by the Badminton World Federation (BWF) from 2007 to 2017.

Men's doubles
| Year | Tournament | Partner | Opponent | Score | Result |
|---|---|---|---|---|---|
| 2002 | Japan Open | (Malaysia) Chan Chong Ming | (Malaysia) Choong Tan Fook (Malaysia) Lee Wan Wah | Walkover | (gold) Winner |
| 2002 | Denmark Open | (Malaysia) Chan Chong Ming | (South Korea) Ha Tae-kwon (South Korea) Kim Dong-moon | 4–15, 8–15 | (silver) Runner-up |
| 2002 | China Open | (Malaysia) Chan Chong Ming | (Thailand) Pramote Teerawiwatana (Thailand) Tesana Panvisvas | 8–15, 8–15 | (silver) Runner-up |
| 2004 | China Open | (Malaysia) Choong Tan Fook | (Indonesia) Sigit Budiarto (Indonesia) Candra Wijaya | Walkover | (silver) Runner-up |
| 2006 | Vietnam Open | (Malaysia) Hong Chieng Hun | (South Korea) Jeon Jun-bum (South Korea) Yoo Yeon-seong | 19–21, 19–21 | (silver) Runner-up |
| 2008 | India Open | (Malaysia) Chan Chong Ming | (China) Guo Zhendong (China) Xie Zhongbo | 21–19, 14–21, 12–21 | (silver) Runner-up |

BWF Grand Prix Gold tournament
BWF Grand Prix tournament
