= Lita Nurlita =

Indonesian badminton player

Personal information
- Born: 1 November 1983 (age 43) Bandung, West Java, Indonesia
- Height: 1.64 m (5 ft 5 in)
- Weight: 58 kg (128 lb; 9.1 st)

Sport
- Country: Indonesia
- Sport: Badminton
- Handedness: Right
- Coached by: Richard Mainaky
- Event: Women's & mixed doubles

Women's & mixed doubles
- BWF profile
Medal record
Women's badminton
Representing Indonesia
Sudirman Cup
Silver medal – second place	2005 Beijing	Mixed team
Silver medal – second place	2007 Glasgow	Mixed team
Bronze medal – third place	2009 Guangzhou	Mixed team
Asian Championships
Bronze medal – third place	2003 Jakarta	Women's doubles
Bronze medal – third place	2005 Hyderabad	Women's doubles
Bronze medal – third place	2007 Johor Bahru	Mixed doubles
Southeast Asian Games
Gold medal – first place	2003 Vietnam	Women's doubles
Gold medal – first place	2007 Nakhon Ratchasima	Women's team
Silver medal – second place	2009 Vientiane	Women's team
Bronze medal – third place	2003 Vietnam	Women's team
Bronze medal – third place	2005 Manila	Women's team
World Junior Championships
Bronze medal – third place	2000 Guangzhou	Mixed doubles
Bronze medal – third place	2000 Guangzhou	Mixed team
Asian Junior Championships
Silver medal – second place	2001 Taipei	Girls' doubles
Bronze medal – third place	2001 Taipei	Girls' team

Lita Nurlita (born 1 November 1983) is an Indonesian former badminton player affiliated with SGS PLN Bandung club. She won the women's doubles title at the 2003 Southeast Asian Games, and was part of the Indonesian women's team that won the 2007 Southeast Asian Games. She also won bronze medals at the Asian Championships in 2003, 2005, and 2007.

== Career ==
Nurlita competed in badminton at the 2004 Summer Olympics in women's doubles with partner Jo Novita. They had a bye in the first round and were defeated by Yang Wei and Zhang Jiewen of China in the round of 16.

== Achievements ==
=== Asian Championships ===
Women's doubles
Year	Venue	Partner	Opponent	Score	Result
2003	Tennis Indoor Gelora Bung Karno; Jakarta, Indonesia	(Indonesia) Jo Novita	(South Korea) Hwang Yu-mi (South Korea) Lee Hyo-jung	3–15, 8–15	Bronze
2005	Gachibowli Indoor Stadium; Hyderabad, India	(Indonesia) Natalia Christine Poluakan	(South Korea) Lee Hyo-jung (South Korea) Lee Kyung-won	5–15, 12–15	Bronze

Mixed doubles
Year	Venue	Partner	Opponent	Score	Result
2007	Stadium Bandaraya; Johor Bahru, Malaysia	(Indonesia) Devin Lahardi Fitriawan	(China) He Hanbin (China) Yu Yang	16–21, 12–21	Bronze

=== Southeast Asian Games ===
Women's doubles
Year	Venue	Partner	Opponent	Score	Result
2003	Tan Binh Sport Center; Ho Chi Minh City, Vietnam	(Indonesia) Jo Novita	(Indonesia) Eny Erlangga (Indonesia) Liliyana Natsir	15–13, 11–15, 15–7	Gold

=== World Junior Championships ===
Mixed doubles
Year	Venue	Partner	Opponent	Score	Result
2000	Tianhe Gymnasium; Guangzhou, China	(Indonesia) Hendra Aprida Gunawan	(China) Sang Yang (China) Zhang Yawen	8–7, 3–7, 0–7, 4–7	Bronze

=== Asian Junior Championships ===
Girls' doubles
Year	Venue	Partner	Opponent	Score	Result
2001	Taipei Gymnasium; Taipei, Taiwan	(Indonesia) Endang Nursugianti	(South Korea) Cho A-ra (South Korea) Hwang Yu-mi	13–15, 11–15	Silver

=== BWF Grand Prix (2 titles, 2 runners-up) ===
The BWF Grand Prix had two levels, the Grand Prix and Grand Prix Gold. It was a series of badminton tournaments sanctioned by the Badminton World Federation (BWF) and played between 2007 and 2017. The World Badminton Grand Prix was sanctioned by the International Badminton Federation from 1983 to 2006.

Women's doubles
Year	Tournament	Partner	Opponent	Score	Result
2004	Chinese Taipei Open	(Indonesia) Jo Novita	(Chinese Taipei) Cheng Wen-hsing (Chinese Taipei) Chien Yu-chin	4–15, 6–15	(silver) Runner-up

Mixed doubles
Year	Tournament	Partner	Opponent	Score	Result
2007	New Zealand Open	(Indonesia) Devin Lahardi Fitriawan	(Indonesia) Anggun Nugroho (Indonesia) Nitya Krishinda Maheswari	21–16, 21–15	(gold) Winner
2008	Chinese Taipei Open	(Indonesia) Devin Lahardi Fitriawan	(Chinese Taipei) Fang Chieh-min (Chinese Taipei) Cheng Wen-hsing	14–21, 21–11, 21–19	(gold) Winner
2010	Indonesian Grand Prix Gold	(Indonesia) Markis Kido	(Indonesia) Tontowi Ahmad (Indonesia) Liliyana Natsir	11–21, 13–21	(silver) Runner-up

BWF Grand Prix Gold tournament
BWF Grand Prix tournament

=== IBF International (1 title) ===
Mixed doubles
Year	Tournament	Partner	Opponent	Score	Result
2001	Jakarta Satellite	(Indonesia) Hendra Aprida Gunawan	(Indonesia) Alvent Yulianto (Indonesia) Yunita Tetty	15–11, 17–14	(gold) Winner

== Performance timeline ==
=== National team ===
- Junior level

Team event	2001
Asian Junior Championships	Bronze

Team event	2000
World Junior Championships	Bronze

- Senior level

Team event	2003	2005	2007	2009
Southeast Asian Games	Bronze	Bronze	Gold	Silver

=== Individual competitions ===
- Junior level

Event	2001
Asian Junior Championships	Silver (GD)

Event	2000
World Junior Championships	Bronze (XD)

- Senior level

Event	2003
Southeast Asian Games	Gold (WD)

Event	2003	2005	2007
Asian Championships	Bronze (WD)	Bronze (WD)	Bronze (XD)

Event	2009	2010	2011
World Championships	3R (XD)	A	1R (XD)

Tournament	IBF Grand Prix			BWF Grand Prix and Grand Prix Gold						Best
Tournament	2004	2005	2006	2007	2008	2009	2010	2011	2012	Best
New Zealand Open				W (XD)			—N/a		—N/a	W ('07)
Chinese Taipei Open	F (WD)			2R (WD); 2R (XD)	W (XD)	A				W ('08)
Indonesian Masters	—N/a						F (WD)	2R (WD)	1R (WD); 1R (XD)	F ('10)
