= 2007 China Open Super Series =

Tournament details
- Dates: November 20, 2007 - November 25, 2007
- Total prize money: US$250,000
- Venue: Tianhe Gymnasium
- Location: Guangzhou, China

The 2007 China Open Super Series is the eleventh tournament of the 2007 BWF Super Series in badminton. It was held in Guangzhou, China from November 20 to November 25, 2007.

== Men's singles ==
=== Seeds ===
1. (China) Lin Dan
2. (Malaysia) Lee Chong Wei
3. (China) Bao Chunlai
4. (China) Chen Jin
5. (Denmark) Peter Gade
6. (China) Chen Yu
7. (Indonesia) Sony Dwi Kuncoro
8. (Denmark) Kenneth Jonassen

=== Results ===
1st round
1	(China) Lin Dan	21	20	17
(South Korea) Park Sung-hwan	19	22	21
Q3	(China) Gong Weijie	16	17
(Malaysia) Muhammad Hafiz Hashim	21	21
8	(Denmark) Kenneth Jonassen	22	21
PFQ	(China) Lü Yi	20	14
(Netherlands) Eric Pang	7	22	22
(Japan) Sho Sasaki	21	20	20
3	(China) Bao Chunlai	21	21
PFQ	(Thailand) Poompat Sapkulchananart	17	18
(Chinese Taipei) Hsieh Yu-Hsin	17	12
Q4	(China) Li Yu	21	21
6	(China) Chen Yu	19	14
(China) Chen Hong	21	21
(Malaysia) Yeoh Kay Bin	9	21	21
(Poland) Przemysław Wacha	21	19	13
(Hong Kong) Ng Wei	18	21	22
(Hong Kong) Chan Yan Kit	21	14	24
(Indonesia) Simon Santoso	19	16
5	(Denmark) Peter Gade	21	21
Q1	(China) Zhou Wenlong	19	15
(Japan) Shoji Sato	21	21
Q2	(China) Du Pengyu	21	5	9
4	(China) Chen Jin	9	21	21
(Malaysia) Roslin Hashim	18	18
(South Korea) Lee Hyun-il	21	21
(Malaysia) Wong Choong Hann	11	21	12
7	(Indonesia) Sony Dwi Kuncoro	21	12	21
(England) Andrew Smith	19	21	21
(Netherlands) Dicky Palyama	21	12	17
(Thailand) Boonsak Ponsana	18	12
2	(Malaysia) Lee Chong Wei	21	21

2nd round
(South Korea) Park Sung-hwan	18	21	21
(Malaysia) Hafiz Hashim	21	13	17
8	(Denmark) Kenneth Jonassen	21	21
(Netherlands) Eric Pang	12	12
3	(China) Bao Chunlai	21	21
Q4	(China) Li Yu	9	13
(China) Chen Hong	21	21
(Malaysia) Yeoh Kay Bin	19	10
(Hong Kong) Chan Yan Kit	12	13
5	(Denmark) Peter Gade	21	21
(Japan) Shoji Sato	10	15
4	(China) Chen Jin	21	21
(South Korea) Lee Hyun-il	11	19
7	(Indonesia) Sony Dwi Kuncoro	21	21
(England) Andrew Smith	13	9
2	(Malaysia) Lee Chong Wei	21	21

Quarterfinals
(South Korea) Park Sung-hwan	21	19	21
8	(Denmark) Kenneth Jonassen	14	21	16
3	(China) Bao Chunlai	WO
(China) Chen Hong
5	(Denmark) Peter Gade	17	17
4	(China) Chen Jin	21	21
7	(Indonesia) Sony Dwi Kuncoro	10	21	14
2	(Malaysia) Lee Chong Wei	21	19	21

Semifinals
(South Korea) Park Sung-hwan	13	16
(China) Bao Chunlai	21	21
Finals
(China) Bao Chunlai	21	21
(Malaysia) Lee Chong Wei	12	13
(China) Chen Jin	22	15	17
(Malaysia) Lee Chong Wei	20	21	21

== Women's singles ==
=== Seeds ===
1. (China) Xie Xingfang
2. (China) Zhang Ning
3. (China) Lu Lan
4. (China) Zhu Lin
5. (Hong Kong) Wang Chen
6. (France) Pi Hongyan
7. (Germany) Xu Huaiwen
8. (Bulgaria) Petya Nedelcheva

=== Results ===
1st round
1	(China) Xie Xingfang	21	21
(Chinese Taipei) Pai Min-Jie	7	7
Q3	(China) Cheng Wen	6	14
(Denmark) Tine Rasmussen	21	21
8	(Bulgaria) Petya Nedelcheva	19	20
(Japan) Kaori Mori	21	22
(Hong Kong) Yip Pui Yin	21	18	20
(Canada) Anna Rice	18	21	22
3	(China) Lu Lan	21	21
Q2	(China) Wang Yihan	12	12
(Chinese Taipei) Cheng Shao-chieh	16	13
(England) Tracey Hallam	21	21
5	(Hong Kong) Wang Chen	17	21	21
(India) Saina Nehwal	21	11	8
(South Korea) Hwang Hye-youn	13	3
(South Korea) Jun Jae-youn	21	21
(Malaysia) Wong Mew Choo	21	21
Q1	(China) Zhu Jingjing	19	11
PFQ	(Thailand) Molthila Meemeak	24	2	6
6	(France) Pi Hongyan	22	21	21
(Hong Kong) Zhou Mi	21	21
(Canada) Charmaine Reid	13	10
(Netherlands) Judith Meulendijks	21	20	17
4	(China) Zhu Lin	18	22	21
(Netherlands) Yao Jie	13	19
Q4	(China) Liu Jie	21	21
(China) Wang Lin	7	21	21
7	(Germany) Xu Huaiwen	21	9	18
(China) Jiang Yanjiao	21	21
PFQ	(Thailand) Soratja Chansrisukot	6	19
(Thailand) Salakjit Ponsana	18	4
2	(China) Zhang Ning	21	21

2nd round
1	(China) Xie Xingfang	21	21
(Denmark) Tine Rasmussen	15	14
(Japan) Kaori Mori	21	21
(Canada) Anna Rice	8	15
3	(China) Lu Lan	21	21
(England) Tracey Hallam	16	9
(Hong Kong) Wang Chen	11	17
(South Korea) Jun Jae-youn	21	21
(Malaysia) Wong Mew Choo	21	16	21
6	(France) Pi Hongyan	17	21	11
(Hong Kong) Zhou Mi	12	21	19
4	(China) Zhu Lin	21	19	21
Q4	(China) Liu Jie	16	19
(China) Wang Lin	21	21
(China) Jiang Yanjiao	13	13
2	(China) Zhang Ning	21	21

Quarterfinals
1	(China) Xie Xingfang	21	21
(Japan) Kaori Mori	11	12
3	(China) Lu Lan	21	21
(South Korea) Jun Jae-youn	13	15
(Malaysia) Wong Mew Choo	18	21	21
4	(China) Zhu Lin	21	9	13
(China) Wang Lin	20	19
2	(China) Zhang Ning	22	21

Semifinals
1	(China) Xie Xingfang	21	21
3	(China) Lu Lan	15	11
Finals
1	(China) Xie Xingfang	16	21	17
(Malaysia) Wong Mew Choo	21	8	21
(Malaysia) Wong Mew Choo	21	21
2	(China) Zhang Ning	16	19

== Men's doubles ==
=== Seeds ===
1. (Malaysia) Koo Kien Keat / Tan Boon Heong
2. (China) Fu Haifeng / Cai Yun
3. (Indonesia) Markis Kido / Hendra Setiawan
4. (Indonesia) Candra Wijaya / (United States) Tony Gunawan
5. (South Korea) Jung Jae-sung / Lee Yong-dae
6. (Malaysia) Choong Tan Fook / Lee Wan Wah
7. (Denmark) Jens Eriksen / Martin Lundgaard Hansen
8. (South Korea) Lee Jae-jin / Hwang Ji-man

=== Results ===
Quarterfinals
(Chinese Taipei) Tsai Chia-Hsin (Chinese Taipei) Hu Chung-hsien	22	12
(Malaysia) Choong Tan Fook (Malaysia) Lee Wan Wah	24	21
(China) Guo Zhendong (China) Xie Zhongbo	21	18	19
(South Korea) Jung Jae-sung (South Korea) Lee Yong-dae	16	21	16
(Denmark) Jens Eriksen (Denmark) Martin Lundgaard Hansen	21	16	16
(Indonesia) Markis Kido (Indonesia) Hendra Setiawan	18	21	21
(Chinese Taipei) Fang Chieh-Min (Chinese Taipei) Lee Sheng-Mu	21	12	21
(Malaysia) Mohd Zakry Abdul Latif (Malaysia) Mohd Fairulzizuan	11	21	15

Semifinals
(Malaysia) Choong Tan Fook (Malaysia) Lee Wan Wah	12	17
(China) Guo Zhendong (China) Xie Zhongbo	21	21
(Indonesia) Markis Kido (Indonesia) Hendra Setiawan	21	21
(Chinese Taipei) Fang Chieh-Min (Chinese Taipei) Lee Sheng-Mu	7	16

Finals
(China) Guo Zhendong (China) Xie Zhongbo	12	19
(Indonesia) Markis Kido (Indonesia) Hendra Setiawan	21	21

== Women's doubles ==
=== Seeds ===
1. (China) Zhang Yawen / Wei Yili
2. (China) Yang Wei / Zhang Jiewen
3. (South Korea) Lee Kyung-won / Lee Hyo-jung
4. (Chinese Taipei) Chien Yu Chin / Cheng Wen-Hsing
5. (China) Gao Ling / Zhao Tingting
6. (Indonesia) Lilyana Natsir / Vita Marissa
7. (England) Gail Emms / Donna Kellogg
8. (Japan) Kumiko Ogura / Reiko Shiota

=== Results ===
Quarterfinals
(China) Zhang Yawen (China) Wei Yili	21	21
(Japan) Miyuki Maeda (Japan) Satoko Suetsuna	11	19
(China) Du Jing (China) Yu Yang	21	21
(Japan) Kumiko Ogura (Japan) Reiko Shiota	5	12
(Indonesia) Lilyana Natsir (Indonesia) Vita Marissa	11	21
(China) Pan Pan (China) Tian Qing	21	23
(China) Gao Ling (China) Zhao Tingting	21	21
(China) Yang Wei (China) Zhang Jiewen	12	17

Semifinals
(China) Zhang Yawen (China) Wei Yili	14	20
(China) Du Jing (China) Yu Yang	21	22
(China) Pan Pan (China) Tian Qing	18	19
(China) Gao Ling (China) Zhao Tingting	21	21

Finals
(China) Du Jing (China) Yu Yang	21	15	8
(China) Gao Ling (China) Zhao Tingting	17	21	21

== Mixed doubles ==
=== Seeds ===
1. (China) Gao Ling / Zheng Bo
2. (Indonesia) Lilyana Natsir / Nova Widianto
3. (England) Gail Emms / Nathan Robertson
4. (China) Zhang Yawen / Xie Zhongbo
5. (Indonesia) Vita Marissa / Flandy Limpele
6. (England) Donna Kellogg / Anthony Clark
7. (Denmark) Kamilla Rytter Juhl / Thomas Laybourn
8. (China) Yu Yang / He Hanbin

=== Results ===
Quarterfinals
(China) Zheng Bo (China) Gao Ling	22	21	22
(Thailand) Sudket Prapakamol (Thailand) Saralee Thungthongkam	24	8	24
(China) Xie Zhongbo (China) Zhang Yawen	WO
(China) Xu Chen (China) Zhao Tingting
(China) He Hanbin (China) Yu Yang	17	18
(England) Nathan Robertson (England) Gail Emms	21	21
(Indonesia) Flandy Limpele (Indonesia) Vita Marissa	21	13	7
(Indonesia) Nova Widianto (Indonesia) Lilyana Natsir	14	21	21

Semifinals
(Thailand) Sudket Prapakamol (Thailand) Saralee Thungthongkam	21	21
(China) Xie Zhongbo (China) Zhang Yawen	16	17
(England) Nathan Robertson (England) Gail Emms	19	15
(Indonesia) Nova Widianto (Indonesia) Lilyana Natsir	21	21

Finals
(Thailand) Sudket Prapakamol (Thailand) Saralee Thungthongkam	21	18	11
(Indonesia) Nova Widianto (Indonesia) Lilyana Natsir	15	21	21

Preceded by 2006 China Open	China Open	Succeeded by 2008 China Open Super Series
Preceded by 2007 French Super Series	BWF Super Series; 2007 BWF Super Series	Succeeded by 2007 Hong Kong Super Series
