= 2007 Denmark Super Series =

Tournament details
- Dates: October 23, 2007 - October 28, 2007
- Total prize money: US$200,000
- Venue: Arena Fyn
- Location: Odense, Denmark

The 2007 Denmark Super Series is the ninth tournament of the 2007 BWF Super Series in badminton. It was held in Odense, Denmark from October 23 to October 28, 2007.

== Men's singles ==
=== Seeds ===
1. (China) Lin Dan
2. (Malaysia) Lee Chong Wei
3. (China) Chen Yu
4. (China) Bao Chunlai
5. (China) Chen Hong
6. (Denmark) Peter Gade
7. (China) Chen Jin
8. (Indonesia) Sony Dwi Kuncoro

=== Results ===
1st Round
1	(China) Lin Dan	21	21
Q2	(Republic of Ireland) Scott Evans	13	10
(Malaysia) Sairul Amar Ayob	21	18	15
(England) Andrew Smith	19	21	21
6	(Denmark) Peter Gade	21	21
PFQ	(Netherlands) Eric Pang	16	12
(Hong Kong) Ng Wei	21	13
(Indonesia) Simon Santoso	23	21
PFQ	(Denmark) Kasper Odum	12	21
Q4	(Thailand) Poompat Sapkulchananart	21	23
(Malaysia) Yeoh Kay Bin	17	12
(Denmark) Kenneth Jonassen	21	21
PFQ	(Denmark) Joachim Persson	21	21
(India) Anup Sridhar	18	13
(Malaysia) Roslin Hashim	20	15
(Malaysia) Hafiz Hashim	22	21
(Japan) Shoji Sato	21	21
(Malaysia) Lee Tsuen Seng	17	14
(Canada) Andrew Dabeka	13	12
7	(China) Chen Jin	21	21
(Indonesia) Taufik Hidayat	21	10	21
(Singapore) Lee Yen Hui Kendrick	13	21	17
(Singapore) Ronald Susilo	6	18
4	(China) Bao Chunlai	21	21
Q3	(Indonesia) Taufiq Hidayat Akbar	21	14	21
(South Korea) Park Sung-hwan	15	21	15
(Hong Kong) Chan Yan Kit	15	15
8	(Indonesia) Sony Dwi Kuncoro	21	21
(Thailand) Boonsak Ponsana	19	13
(Poland) Przemysław Wacha	21	21
Q1	(Denmark) Peter Mikkelsen	15	13
2	(Malaysia) Lee Chong Wei	21	21

2nd Round
(China) Lin Dan	21	21
(England) Andrew Smith	18	11
(Denmark) Peter Gade	17	18
(Indonesia) Simon Santoso	21	21
(Thailand) P. Sapkulchananart	8	17
(Denmark) Kenneth Jonassen	21	21
(Denmark) Joachim Persson	21	21
(Malaysia) Hafiz Hashim	17	15
(Japan) Shoji Sato	17	14
(China) Chen Jin	21	21
(Indonesia) Taufik Hidayat	21	6	15
(China) Bao Chunlai	19	21	21
(Indonesia) Taufiq Hidayat Akbar	21	19
(Indonesia) Sony Dwi Kuncoro	23	21
(Poland) Przemysław Wacha	12	13
(Malaysia) Lee Chong Wei	21	21

Quarterfinals
(China) Lin Dan	21	21
(Indonesia) Simon Santoso	14	12
(Denmark) Kenneth Jonassen	21	15	21
(Denmark) Joachim Persson	15	21	14
(China) Chen Jin	17	21	18
(China) Bao Chunlai	21	13	21
(Indonesia) Sony Dwi Kuncoro	18	10
(Malaysia) Lee Chong Wei	21	21

Semifinals
(China) Lin Dan	21	20	21
(Denmark) Kenneth Jonassen	13	22	13
(China) Bao Chunlai	11	21	21
(Malaysia) Lee Chong Wei	21	18	16

Finals
(China) Lin Dan	21	21
(China) Bao Chunlai	15	12

== Women's singles ==
=== Seeds ===
1. (China) Zhang Ning
2. (China) Xie Xingfang
3. (China) Zhu Lin
4. (Hong Kong) Wang Chen
5. (China) Lu Lan
6. (France) Pi Hongyan
7. (Germany) Xu Huaiwen
8. (Netherlands) Yao Jie

=== Results ===
1st round
1	(China) Zhang Ning	19	21	21
(Sweden) Sara Persson	21	16	18
(Japan) Kaori Mori	21	21
(Indonesia) Adriyanti Firdasari	13	17
PFQ	(Scotland) Susan Hughes	22	16	12
(Hong Kong) Zhou Mi	20	21	21
Q2	(South Korea) Jun Jae-youn	21	18	21
Q4	(South Korea) Lee Yun-hwa	19	21	12
4	(Hong Kong) Wang Chen	21	21
Q1	(Bulgaria) Linda Zechiri	3	6
(Russia) Ella Karachkova	21	12	12
(Germany) Juliane Schenk	12	21	21
6	(France) Pi Hongyan	21	21
(Canada) Anna Rice	10	12
(Indonesia) Maria Kristin Yulianti	12	21	18
(Hong Kong) Yip Pui Yin	21	17	21
(Denmark) Tine Rasmussen	21	21
(Finland) Anu Nieminen	9	18
(Netherlands) Judith Meulendijks	15	11
7	(Germany) Xu Huaiwen	21	21
(China) Jiang Yanjiao	21	21
(Malaysia) Wong Mew Choo	14	17
(India) Saina Nehwal	21	12	6
3	(China) Zhu Lin	17	21	21
(Japan) Eriko Hirose	12	12
(Bulgaria) Petya Nedelcheva	21	21
Q3	(Russia) Ekaterina Ananina	9	17
5	(China) Lu Lan	21	21
(England) Tracey Hallam	21	21
(Singapore) Li Li	13	18
(South Korea) Hwang Hye-youn	16	19
2	(China) Xie Xingfang	21	21

2nd round
(China) Zhang Ning	21	15	21
(Japan) Kaori Mori	15	21	17
(Hong Kong) Zhou Mi	21	21
(South Korea) Jun Jae-youn	12	14
(Hong Kong) Wang Chen	21	21
(Germany) Juliane Schenk	12	7
(France) Pi Hongyan	19	22	21
(Hong Kong) Yip Pui Yin	21	20	10
(Denmark) Tine Rasmussen	10	14
(Germany) Xu Huaiwen	21	21
(China) Jiang Yanjiao	18	12
(China) Zhu Lin	21	21
(Bulgaria) Petya Nedelcheva	21	16	3
(China) Lu Lan	19	21	21
(England) Tracey Hallam	7	8
(China) Xie Xingfang	21	21

Quarterfinals
(China) Zhang Ning	21	15	21
(Hong Kong) Zhou Mi	19	21	17
(Hong Kong) Wang Chen	21	21
(France) Pi Hongyan	15	11
(Germany) Xu Huaiwen	22	19
(China) Zhu Lin	24	21
(China) Lu Lan	22	15	21
(China) Xie Xingfang	20	21	17

Semifinals
(China) Zhang Ning	18	21	21
(Hong Kong) Wang Chen	21	17	18
Finals
(China) Zhang Ning	17	14
(China) Lu Lan	21	21
(China) Zhu Lin	12	10
(China) Lu Lan	21	21

== Men's doubles ==
=== Seeds ===
1. (Indonesia) Markis Kido / Hendra Setiawan
2. (China) Fu Haifeng / Cai Yun
3. (Malaysia) Koo Kien Keat / Tan Boon Heong (Champion)
4. (Denmark) Jens Eriksen / Martin Lundgaard Hansen
5. (Malaysia) Choong Tan Fook / Lee Wan Wah
6. (South Korea) Jung Jae-sung / Lee Yong-dae
7. (Indonesia) Luluk Hadiyanto / Alvent Yulianto
8. (Denmark) Lars Paaske / Jonas Rasmussen

=== Results ===
1st round
1	(Indonesia) Markis Kido (Indonesia) Hendra Setiawan	23	21
(Denmark) Simon Mollyhus (Denmark) Anders Kristiansen	21	15
(China) Guo Zhendong (China) Xie Zhongbo	21	18	24
(Thailand) Sudket Prapakamol (Thailand) Phattapol Ngensrisuk	17	21	22
7	(Indonesia) Luluk Hadiyanto (Indonesia) Alvent Yulianto	21	22
(Hong Kong) Albertus Susanto Njoto (Hong Kong) Yohan Hadikusumo Wiratama	19	20
(Indonesia) Rian Sukmawan (Indonesia) Yohan Dasuki	21	21
Q3	(Denmark) Jacob Chemnitz (Denmark) Mikkel Delbo Larsen	15	15
3	(Malaysia) Koo Kien Keat (Malaysia) Tan Boon Heong	21	21
(Singapore) Hendri Kurniawan Saputra (Singapore) Hendra Wijaya	14	15
(Indonesia) Hendra A Gunawan (Indonesia) Joko Riyadi	21	21
(Germany) Roman Spitko (Germany) Michael Fuchs	12	13
8	(Denmark) Lars Paaske (Denmark) Jonas Rasmussen	19	22
(Denmark) Mathias Boe (Denmark) Carsten Mogensen	21	24
(Poland) Michal Logosz (Poland) Robert Mateusiak	21	20	21
(Canada) Mike Beres (Canada) William Milroy	18	22	15
(South Korea) Lee Jae-jin (South Korea) Yoo Yeon-seong	21	21
(Germany) Kristof Hopp (Germany) Ingo Kindervater	16	17
(United States) Howard Bach (United States) Khan Bob Malaythong	23	13	21
5	(Malaysia) Choong Tan Fook (Malaysia) Lee Wan Wah	21	21	17
(Germany) Johannes Schoettler (Germany) Tim Dettmann	20	21	21
Q2	(Denmark) Martin Kragh (Denmark) Tore Vilhelmsen	22	13	17
(Japan) Tadashi Ohtsuka (Japan) Keita Masuda	14	18
4	(Denmark) Jens Eriksen (Denmark) Martin Lundgaard Hansen	21	21
(Japan) Shuichi Sakamoto (Japan) Shintaro Ikeda	18	21	24
(England) Robert Adcock (England) Robin Middleton	21	15	22
Q1	(England) Robert Blair (England) David Lindley	19	14
6	(South Korea) Jung Jae-sung (South Korea) Lee Yong-dae	21	21
PFQ	(China) Sun Junjie (China) Xu Chen	21	21
(Japan) Naoki Kawamae (Japan) Keishi Kawaguchi	17	17
Q4	(Denmark) Rasmus Mangor Andersen (Denmark) Peter Buur Steffensen	12	15
2	(China) Fu Haifeng (China) Cai Yun	21	21

2nd round
(Indonesia) Markis Kido (Indonesia) Hendra Setiawan	22	17	21
(China) Guo Zhendong (China) Xie Zhongbo	20	21	19
(Indonesia) Luluk Hadiyanto (Indonesia) Alvent Yulianto	17	21	10
(Indonesia) Rian Sukmawan (Indonesia) Yohan Dasuki	21	15	21
(Malaysia) Koo Kien Keat (Malaysia) Tan Boon Heong	21	21
(Indonesia) Hendra A Gunawan (Indonesia) Joko Riyadi	18	18
(Denmark) Mathias Boe (Denmark) Carsten Mogensen	21	13	21
(Poland) Michal Logosz (Poland) Robert Mateusiak	10	21	13
(South Korea) Lee Jae-jin (South Korea) Yoo Yeon-seong	21	21
(United States) Howard Bach (United States) Khan Bob Malaythong	13	15
(Germany) Johannes Schoettler (Germany) Tim Dettmann	9	14
(Denmark) Jens Eriksen (Denmark) Martin Lundgaard Hansen	21	21
(Japan) Shuichi Sakamoto (Japan) Shintaro Ikeda	21	17	16
(South Korea) Jung Jae-sung (South Korea) Lee Yong-dae	16	21	21
(China) Sun Junjie (China) Xu Chen	21	15	14
(China) Fu Haifeng (China) Cai Yun	18	21	21

Quarterfinals
(Indonesia) Markis Kido (Indonesia) Hendra Setiawan	19	21	21
(Indonesia) Rian Sukmawan (Indonesia) Yohan Dasuki	21	14	19
(Malaysia) Koo Kien Keat (Malaysia) Tan Boon Heong	21	21
(Denmark) Mathias Boe (Denmark) Carsten Mogensen	14	19
(South Korea) Lee Jae-jin (South Korea) Yoo Yeon-seong	16	21	18
(Denmark) Jens Eriksen (Denmark) Martin Lundgaard Hansen	21	15	21
(South Korea) Jung Jae-sung (South Korea) Lee Yong-dae	19	18
(China) Fu Haifeng (China) Cai Yun	21	21

Semifinals
(Indonesia) Markis Kido (Indonesia) Hendra Setiawan	18	10
(Malaysia) Koo Kien Keat (Malaysia) Tan Boon Heong	21	21
Finals
(Malaysia) Koo Kien Keat (Malaysia) Tan Boon Heong	14	21	21
(Denmark) Jens Eriksen (Denmark) Martin Lundgaard Hansen	21	14	12
(Denmark) Jens Eriksen (Denmark) Martin Lundgaard Hansen	21	21	21
(China) Fu Haifeng (China) Cai Yun	16	23	19

== Women's doubles ==
=== Seeds ===
1. (China) Zhang Yawen / Wei Yili
2. (China) Yang Wei / Zhang Jiewen
3. (South Korea) Lee Kyung-won / Lee Hyo-jung
4. (China) Gao Ling / Huang Sui
5. (China) Zhao Tingting / Yu Yang
6. (Japan) Kumiko Ogura / Reiko Shiota
7. (Singapore) Jiang Yanmei / Li Yujia
8. (England) Gail Emms / Donna Kellogg

=== Results ===
Quarterfinals
(Malaysia) Wong Pei Tty (Malaysia) Chin Eei Hui	6	0
(China) Zhao Tingting (China) Yu Yang	21	6
(South Korea) Lee Kyung-won (South Korea) Lee Hyo-jung	21	21
(Japan) Kumiko Ogura (Japan) Reiko Shiota	12	11
(England) Gail Emms (England) Donna Kellogg	21	21
(Sweden) Johanna Persson (Sweden) Elin Bergblom	16	18
(South Korea) Ha Jung-eun (South Korea) Kim Min-jung	16	14
(China) Yang Wei (China) Zhang Jiewen	21	21

Semifinals
(China) Zhao Tingting (China) Yu Yang	19	13
(South Korea) Lee Kyung-won (South Korea) Lee Hyo-jung	21	21
(England) Gail Emms (England) Donna Kellogg	14	13
(China) Yang Wei (China) Zhang Jiewen	21	21

Finals
(South Korea) Lee Kyung-won (South Korea) Lee Hyo-jung	21	19	19
(China) Yang Wei (China) Zhang Jiewen	12	21	21

== Mixed doubles ==
=== Seeds ===
1. (Indonesia) Nova Widianto / Lilyana Natsir
2. (Indonesia) Flandy Limpele / Vita Marissa
3. (England) Nathan Robertson / Gail Emms
4. (China) Xie Zhongbo / Zhang Yawen
5. (Denmark) Thomas Laybourn / Kamilla Rytter Juhl
6. (England) Anthony Clark / Donna Kellogg
7. (China) He Hanbin / Yu Yang
8. (China) Xu Chen / Zhao Tingting

=== Results ===
Quarterfinals
(Thailand) Sudket Prapakamol (Thailand) Saralee Thungthongkam	21	21
(England) Anthony Clark (England) Donna Kellogg	6	18
(England) Nathan Robertson (England) Gail Emms	19	21	21
(Denmark) Jens Eriksen (Denmark) Helle Nielsen	21	14	19
(Denmark) Thomas Laybourn (Denmark) Kamilla Rytter Juhl	16	17
(China) Xie Zhongbo (China) Zhang Yawen	21	21
(China) He Hanbin (China) Yu Yang	21	21
(Indonesia) Flandy Limpele (Indonesia) Vita Marissa	17	16

Semifinals
(Thailand) Sudket Prapakamol (Thailand) Saralee Thungthongkam	19	17
(England) Nathan Robertson (England) Gail Emms	21	21
(China) Xie Zhongbo (China) Zhang Yawen	12	15
(China) He Hanbin (China) Yu Yang	21	21

Finals
(England) Nathan Robertson (England) Gail Emms	17	21	17
(China) He Hanbin (China) Yu Yang	21	19	21
