= 2007 Malaysia Super Series =

2007 Malaysia Open Super Series
Tournament details
- Dates: 16 January 2007 – 21 January 2007
- Edition: 52nd
- Level: Super Series Premier
- Total prize money: US$200,000
- Venue: Kuala Lumpur Badminton Stadium
- Location: Kuala Lumpur, Malaysia

Champions
- Men's singles: (Denmark) Peter Gade
- Women's singles: (China) Zhu Lin
- Men's doubles: (Malaysia) Koo Kien Keat (Malaysia) Tan Boon Heong
- Women's doubles: (China) Gao Ling (China) Huang Sui
- Mixed doubles: (China) Zheng Bo (China) Gao Ling

The 2007 Malaysia Open Super Series (officially known as the Proton Malaysia Super Series 2007 for sponsorship reasons) was a badminton tournament which took place at Kuala Lumpur Badminton Stadium in Kuala Lumpur, Malaysia, from 16 to 21 January 2007 and had a total purse of $200,000.

== Tournament ==
The 2007 Malaysia Open Super Series was the inaugural tournament of the 2007 BWF Super Series and also part of the Malaysia Open championships, which had been held since 1937.

=== Venue ===
This international tournament was held at Kuala Lumpur Badminton Stadium in Kuala Lumpur, Malaysia.

=== Point distribution ===
Below is the point distribution for each phase of the tournament based on the BWF points system for the BWF Super Series event.

Winner	Runner-up	3/4	5/8	9/16	17/32	33/64	65/128	129/256
9,200	7,800	6,420	5,040	3,600	2,220	880	430	170

=== Prize money ===
The total prize money for this tournament was US$200,000. Distribution of prize money was in accordance with BWF regulations.

Event	Winner	Finalist	Semi-finals	Quarter-finals	Last 16
Men's singles	$16,000	$8,000	$4,000	$2,000	$800
Women's singles	$13,800	$6,600	$3,600	$1,800	—N/a
Men's doubles	$14,400	$8,000	$4,800	$2,800	—N/a
Women's doubles	$12,200	$8,000	$4,400	$2,200	—N/a
Mixed doubles	$12,200	$8,000	$4,400	$2,200	—N/a

== Men's singles ==
=== Seeds ===
1. (China) Lin Dan (second round)
2. (Malaysia) Lee Chong Wei (quarter-finals)
3. (Denmark) Peter Gade (champion)
4. (China) Chen Hong (semi-finals)
5. (China) Chen Jin (quarter-finals)
6. (China) Bao Chunlai (final)
7. (Denmark) Kenneth Jonassen (semi-finals)
8. (China) Chen Yu (quarter-finals)

=== Finals ===
Semi-finals
7	(Denmark) Kenneth Jonassen	15	21	11
3	(Denmark) Peter Gade	21	16	21
4	(China) Chen Hong
6	(China) Bao Chunlai	w	/	o

Final
3	(Denmark) Peter Gade	21	17	21
6	(China) Bao Chunlai	15	21	14

=== Top half ===
==== Section 1 ====
First Round
1	(China) Lin D	21	23
(Indonesia) T Hidayat	19	21
Q4	(Japan) Y Nakanishi	14	21	10
(South Korea) Park S-h	21	17	21
7	(Denmark) K Jonassen	21	21
(Singapore) K Lee Y H	11	11
Q3	(India) A Sridhar	21	19	12
(India) C Anand	12	21	21

Second Round
1	(China) Lin D	14	17
(South Korea) Park S-h	21	21
7	(Denmark) K Jonassen	21	21
(India) C Anand	12	14

Quarter-finals
(South Korea) Park S-h	19	15
7	(Denmark) K Jonassen	21	21

==== Section 2 ====
First Round
3	(Denmark) P Gade	22	21
(Netherlands) E Pang	20	11
(Thailand) B Ponsana	21	10	19
PFQ	(Singapore) R Susilo	15	21	21
8	(China) Chen Y	20	21	22
(Netherlands) D Palyama	21	10	19
(Malaysia) Yeoh K B	21	12	21
(England) A Smith	16	21	17

Second Round
3	(Denmark) P Gade	21	21
(Singapore) R Susilo	13	10
8	(China) Chen Y	13	21	21
(Malaysia) Yeoh K B	21	15	13

Quarter-finals
3	(Denmark) P Gade	21	21
8	(China) Chen Y	14	13

=== Bottom half ===
==== Section 3 ====
First Round
Q2	(Malaysia) Wong C H	21	21
(New Zealand) J Moody	13	12
(Hong Kong) Chan Y K	5	9
5	(China) Chen J	21	21
Q1	(Indonesia) S D Kuncoro	21	19	21
(Malaysia) Lee T S	18	21	17
(Malaysia) M H Hashim	21	13	18
4	(China) Chen H	9	21	21

Second Round
Q2	(Malaysia) Wong C H	21	18	20
5	(China) Chen J	15	21	21
Q1	(Indonesia) S D Kuncoro	14	21	13
4	(China) Chen H	21	16	21

Quarter-finals
5	(China) Chen J	21	20	16
4	(China) Chen H	19	22	21

==== Section 4 ====
First Round
(Hong Kong) Ng W	19	17
(Malaysia) Kuan B H	21	21
(Denmark) K Ødum	18	14
4	(China) Bao CL	21	21
(Poland) P Wacha	21	14	21
(Japan) S Satō	17	21	18
(Germany) B Joppien	14	9
2	(Malaysia) Lee C W	21	21

Second Round
(Malaysia) Kuan B H	10	13
4	(China) Bao CL	21	21
(Poland) P Wacha	14	17
2	(Malaysia) Lee C W	21	21

Quarter-finals
4	(China) Bao CL	21	21
2	(Malaysia) Lee C W	14	18

== Women's singles ==
=== Seeds ===
1. (China) Zhang Ning (withdrew)
2. (China) Xie Xingfang (withdrew)
3. (Germany) Huaiwen Xu (quarter-finals)
4. (Hong Kong) Wang Chen (withdrew)
5. (China) Lu Lan (second round)
6. (China) Zhu Lin (champion)
7. (France) Pi Hongyan (first round)
8. (Netherlands) Yao Jie (semi-finals)

=== Finals ===
Semi-finals
6	(China) Zhu Lin	21	21
8	(Netherlands) Yao Jie	8	11
(Malaysia) Wong Mew Choo	21	21
(Japan) Eriko Hirose	18	19

Final
6	(China) Zhu Lin	21	21
(Malaysia) Wong Mew Choo	15	12

=== Top half ===
==== Section 1 ====
First Round
PFQ	(Canada) A Rice	18	3
(South Korea) Hwang H-y	21	21
(Singapore) Li L	21	21
Q2	(Poland) K Augustyn	10	14
6	(China) Zhu L	21	21
(Finland) A Nieminen	13	13
(Japan) K Mori	19	8
(Malaysia) J Wong P X	21	21

Second Round
(South Korea) Hwang H-y	21	21
(Singapore) Li L	8	13
6	(China) Zhu L	21	21
(Malaysia) J Wong P X	8	16

Quarter-finals
(South Korea) Hwang H-y	10	10
6	(China) Zhu L	21	21

==== Section 2 ====
First Round
PFQ	(Indonesia) M K Yulianti	19	21	23
(Russia) E Karachkova	21	6	21
(Bulgaria) P Nedelcheva	21	21
Q3	(South Korea) Kang H-w	14	9
8	(Netherlands) Yao J	21	21
(Sweden) S Persson	18	12
(Denmark) T Rasmussen	16	21	21
(New Zealand) R Hindley	21	7	14

Second Round
PFQ	(Indonesia) M K Yulianti	21	19	17
(Bulgaria) P Nedelcheva	17	21	21
8	(Netherlands) Yao J	16	21	21
(Denmark) T Rasmussen	21	18	13

Quarter-finals
(Bulgaria) P Nedelcheva	21	13	14
8	(Netherlands) Yao J	15	21	21

=== Bottom half ===
==== Section 3 ====
First Round
(Netherlands) J Meulendijks	10	21	18
(India) S Nehwal	21	17	21
(Malaysia) Wong M C	21	21
7	(France) Pi HY	18	10
(Germany) J Schenk	21	22
Q4	(South Korea) Kim M-h	12	20
(China) Wang L	21	17	5
3	(Germany) HW Xu	15	21	21

Second Round
(India) S Nehwal	17	12
(Malaysia) Wong M C	21	21
(Germany) J Schenk	17	6
3	(Germany) HW Xu	21	21

Quarter-finals
(Malaysia) Wong M C	15	21	22
3	(Germany) HW Xu	21	15	20

==== Section 4 ====
First Round
(Japan) Y Hirayama	21	17	19
(Hong Kong) Yip P Y	19	21	21
(Scotland) S Hughes	10	13
5	(China) Lu L	21	21
PFQ	(Singapore) Xing AY	16	15
Q1	(South Korea) Lee H-j	21	21
(Japan) E Hirose	21	21
PFQ	(Malaysia) S Mudukasan	10	16

Second Round
(Hong Kong) Yip P Y	19	21	21
5	(China) Lu L	21	12	14
Q1	(South Korea) Lee H-j	13	16
(Japan) E Hirose	21	21

Quarter-finals
(Hong Kong) Yip P Y	21	12	10
(Japan) E Hirose	15	21	21

== Men's doubles ==
=== Seeds ===
1. (China) Cai Yun / Fu Haifeng (second round)
2. (Denmark) Jens Eriksen / Martin Lundgaard Hansen (quarter-finals)
3. (Malaysia) Choong Tan Fook / Lee Wan Wah (first round)
4. (South Korea) Jung Jae-sung / Lee Yong-dae (semi-finals)
5. (England) Robert Blair / Anthony Clark (quarter-finals)
6. (United States) Tony Gunawan / (Indonesia) Candra Wijaya (final)
7. (Indonesia) Markis Kido / Hendra Setiawan (semi-finals)
8. (Malaysia) Robert Lin Woon Fui / Mohd Fairuzizuan Mohd Tazari (second round)

=== Finals ===
Semi-finals
5	(United States) Tony Gunawan (Indonesia) Candra Wijaya	w	/	o
4	(South Korea) Jung Jae-sung (South Korea) Lee Yong-dae
Q3	(Malaysia) Koo Kien Keat (Malaysia) Tan Boon Heong	21	21
6	(Indonesia) Markis Kido (Indonesia) Hendra Setiawan	19	16

Final
5	(United States) Tony Gunawan (Indonesia) Candra Wijaya	15	18
Q3	(Malaysia) Koo Kien Keat (Malaysia) Tan Boon Heong	21	21

=== Top half ===
==== Section 1 ====
First Round
1	(China) Cai Y (China) Fu HF	21	12	21
(Denmark) M Boe (Denmark) J Fischer Nielsen	15	21	10
Q2	(Malaysia) Ong S H (Malaysia) Tan B S	26	21
(Japan) K Masuda (Japan) T Ōtsuka	24	10
5	(United States) T Gunawan (Indonesia) C Wijaya	21	21
(Germany) K Hopp (Germany) I Kindervater	9	12
Q4	(Australia) R Smith (Australia) G Warfe	18	16
(Australia) A Brehaut (Australia) A B Sindoro	21	21

Second Round
1	(China) Cai Y (China) Fu HF	23	17
Q2	(Malaysia) Ong S H (Malaysia) Tan B S	25	21
5	(United States) T Gunawan (Indonesia) C Wijaya	21	21
(Australia) A Brehaut (Australia) A B Sindoro	16	15

Quarter-finals
Q2	(Malaysia) Ong S H (Malaysia) Tan B S	18	11
5	(United States) T Gunawan (Indonesia) C Wijaya	21	21

==== Section 2 ====
First Round
3	(South Korea) Jung J-s (South Korea) Lee Y-d	21	21
(France) M Popov (France) S Stoyanov	12	16
(Indonesia) E Hian (Indonesia) R Sukmawan	17	21	13
(Denmark) L Paaske (Denmark) J Rasmussen	21	18	21
7	(England) R Blair (England) A Clark	21	21
(Hong Kong) A S Njoto (Hong Kong) Y H Wiratama	14	19
(Indonesia) H A Gunawan (Indonesia) J Riyadi	21	14	20
(Germany) M Fuchs (Germany) R Spitko	7	21	22

Second Round
3	(South Korea) Jung J-s (South Korea) Lee Y-d	21	21
(Denmark) L Paaske (Denmark) J Rasmussen	13	19
7	(England) R Blair (England) A Clark	21	16	21
(Germany) M Fuchs (Germany) R Spitko	18	21	11

Quarter-finals
3	(South Korea) Jung J-s (South Korea) Lee Y-d	14	21	21
7	(England) R Blair (England) A Clark	21	19	18

=== Bottom half ===
==== Section 3 ====
First Round
(Japan) S Ikeda (Japan) S Sakamoto	18	21	21
(Singapore) H Saputra (Singapore) H Wijaya	21	19	13
(China) Guo ZD (China) Xie ZB
8	(Malaysia) R Lin W F (Malaysia) M F Mohd Tazari	w	/	o
Q3	(Malaysia) Koo K K (Malaysia) Tan B H	21	21
(Malaysia) Chan C M (Malaysia) Hoon T H	12	19
(Denmark) A Kristiansen (Denmark) S Mollyhus	18	21	21
4	(Malaysia) Choong T F (Malaysia) Lee W W	21	15	17

Second Round
(Japan) S Ikeda (Japan) S Sakamoto	21	21
8	(Malaysia) R Lin W F (Malaysia) M F Mohd Tazari	12	11
Q3	(Malaysia) Koo K K (Malaysia) Tan B H	21	21
(Denmark) A Kristiansen (Denmark) S Mollyhus	18	19

Quarter-finals
(Japan) S Ikeda (Japan) S Sakamoto	13	17
Q3	(Malaysia) Koo K K (Malaysia) Tan B H	21	21

==== Section 4 ====
First Round
Q1	(South Korea) Cho G-w (South Korea) Hwang J-m	13	17
(Indonesia) L Hadiyanto (Indonesia) A Yulianto	21	21
(China) He HB (China) Shen Y	15	17
6	(Indonesia) M Kido (Indonesia) H Setiawan	21	21
(Malaysia) M Z Abdul Latif (Malaysia) Gan T C	21	17	18
(Thailand) P Ngernsrisuk (Thailand) S Prapalamol	9	21	21
(Poland) M Łogosz (Poland) R Mateusiak	21	17	10
2	(Denmark) J Eriksen (Denmark) M Lundgaard Hansen	19	21	21

Second Round
(Indonesia) L Hadiyanto (Indonesia) A Yulianto	11	13
6	(Indonesia) M Kido (Indonesia) H Setiawan	21	21
(Thailand) P Ngernsrisuk (Thailand) S Prapalamol	17	21	17
2	(Denmark) J Eriksen (Denmark) M Lundgaard Hansen	21	13	21

Quarter-finals
6	(Indonesia) M Kido (Indonesia) H Setiawan	17	21	30
2	(Denmark) J Eriksen (Denmark) M Lundgaard Hansen	21	16	28

== Women's doubles ==
=== Seeds ===
1. (China) Gao Ling / Huang Sui (champions)
2. (China) Yang Wei / Zhang Jiewen (quarter-finals)
3. (Malaysia) Wong Pei Tty / Chin Eei Hui (first round)
4. (China) Zhang Yawen / Wei Yili (withdrew)
5. (China) Du Jing / Zhao Tingting (quarter-finals)
6. (England) Gail Emms / Donna Kellogg (first round)
7. (Singapore) Jiang Yanmei / Li Yujia (quarter-finals)
8. (Indonesia) Endang Nursugianti / Rani Mundiasti (quarter-finals)

=== Finals ===
Semi-finals
1	(China) Gao Ling (China) Huang Sui	21	21
(South Korea) Hwang Yu-mi (South Korea) Kim Min-jung	19	10
(Indonesia) Greysia Polii (Indonesia) Vita Marissa	20	21	21
(Japan) Kumiko Ogura (Japan) Reiko Shiota	22	17	13

Final
1	(China) Gao Ling (China) Huang Sui	19	21	21
(Indonesia) Greysia Polii (Indonesia) Vita Marissa	21	12	11

=== Top half ===
==== Section 1 ====
First Round
1	(China) Gao L (China) Huang S	16	21	21
(Japan) A Akao (Japan) T Matsuda	21	6	14
(France) É Eymard (France) W Rahmawati	w	/	o
(Sweden) J Persson (Sweden) E Bergblom
5/8	(China) Du J (China) Zhao TT	21	21
(Canada) F McKee (Canada) C Reid	5	7
(Bulgaria) P Nedelcheva (Bulgaria) D Dimova	21	21
(Malaysia) Mooi H Y (Malaysia) Ooi Y H	16	19

Second Round
1	(China) Gao L (China) Huang S	21	21
(France) É Eymard (France) W Rahmawati	8	8
5/8	(China) Du J (China) Zhao TT	21	21
(Bulgaria) P Nedelcheva (Bulgaria) D Dimova	11	11

Quarter-finals
1	(China) Gao L (China) Huang S	21	21
5/8	(China) Du J (China) Zhao TT	15	9

==== Section 2 ====
First Round
3/4	(China) Zhang YW (China) Wei YL
(South Korea) Hwang Y-m (South Korea) Kim M-j	w	/	o
(India) S Kurien (India) J Gutta	21	21	21
(Russia) N Vislova (Russia) V Sorokina	14	23	13
5/8	(Indonesia) E Nursugianti (Indonesia) R Mundiasti	23	21
(England) S Rayappan (England) J Wallwork	21	14
(Malaysia) Fong C Y (Malaysia) See P L	12	23
(Indonesia) L Nurlita (Indonesia) N C Poluakan	21	25

Second Round
(South Korea) Hwang Y-m (South Korea) Kim M-j	21	21
(India) S Kurien (India) J Gutta	19	5
5/8	(Indonesia) E Nursugianti (Indonesia) R Mundiasti	15	21	21
(Indonesia) L Nurlita (Indonesia) N C Poluakan	21	7	17

Quarter-finals
(South Korea) Hwang Y-m (South Korea) Kim M-j	15	21	21
5/8	(Indonesia) E Nursugianti (Indonesia) R Mundiasti	21	12	18

=== Bottom half ===
==== Section 3 ====
First Round
(Malaysia) Lim P S (Malaysia) J Quay	22	21
(England) J Nicholas (England) N Munt	20	13
(Malaysia) Haw C H (Malaysia) Lim Y L	14	12
5/8	(Singapore) Jiang YM (Singapore) Li YJ	21	21
(Denmark) L Frier Kistiansen (Denmark) K Rytter Juhl	21	23	21
(Germany) N Grether (Germany) J Schenk	10	25	14
(Indonesia) G Polii (Indonesia) V Marissa	19	21	21
3/4	(Malaysia) Wong P T (Malaysia) Chin E H	21	14	15

Second Round
(Malaysia) Lim P S (Malaysia) J Quay	9	19
5/8	(Singapore) Jiang YM (Singapore) Li YJ	21	21
(Denmark) L Frier Kistiansen (Denmark) K Rytter Juhl	21	12	18
(Indonesia) G Polii (Indonesia) V Marissa	15	21	21

Quarter-finals
5/8	(Singapore) Jiang YM (Singapore) Li YJ	18	17
(Indonesia) G Polii (Indonesia) V Marissa	21	21

==== Section 4 ====
First Round
(Russia) A Russkikh (Russia) E Ananina	16	21	21
(Poland) K Augustyn (Poland) N Kostiuczyk	21	12	11
(Japan) K Ogura (Japan) R Shiota	21	21
5/8	(England) G Emms (England) D Kellogg	15	10
(Hong Kong) Wong M C (Hong Kong) Chau H W	7	13
(Japan) M Maeda (Japan) S Suetsuna	21	21
(Germany) C Mette (Germany) B Overzier	6	2
2	(China) Yang W (China) Zhang JW	21	21

Second Round
(Russia) A Russkikh (Russia) E Ananina	15	16
(Japan) K Ogura (Japan) R Shiota	21	21
(Japan) M Maeda (Japan) S Suetsuna	22	21	16
2	(China) Yang W (China) Zhang JW	20	23	21

Quarter-finals
(Japan) K Ogura (Japan) R Shiota	21	18	24
2	(China) Yang W (China) Zhang JW	15	21	22

== Mixed doubles ==
=== Seeds ===
1. (Indonesia) Nova Widianto / Liliyana Natsir (semi-finals)
2. (Thailand) Sudket Prapakamol / Saralee Thungthongkam (second round)
3. (England) Anthony Clark / Donna Kellogg (second round)
4. (China) Xie Zhongbo / Zhang Yawen (withdrew)
5. (England) Nathan Robertson / Gail Emms (final)
6. (China) Zheng Bo / Gao Ling (champions)
7. (Denmark) Thomas Laybourn / Kamilla Rytter Juhl (quarter-finals)
8. (China) Zhang Jun / Zhao Tingting (quarter-finals)

=== Finals ===
Semi-finals
1	(Indonesia) Nova Widianto (Indonesia) Liliyana Natsir	8	9
5/8	(China) Zheng Bo (China) Gao Ling	21	21
Q3	(Denmark) Joachim Fischer Nielsen (Denmark) Britta Andersen	17	16
5/8	(England) Nathan Robertson (England) Gail Emms	21	21

Final
5/8	(China) Zheng Bo (China) Gao Ling	21	14	21
5/8	(England) Nathan Robertson (England) Gail Emms	12	21	15

=== Top half ===
==== Section 1 ====
First Round
1	(Indonesia) N Widianto (Indonesia) L Natsir	21	21
(Malaysia) Chan P S (Malaysia) Haw C H	13	9
Q2	(Malaysia) M F Mohd Tazari (Malaysia) Ooi S A	14	16
(Denmark) L Paaske (Denmark) M Schjoldager	21	21
5/8	(Denmark) T Laybourn (Denmark) K Rytter Juhl	21	21
(England) D Lindley (England) S Rayappan	13	16
(Malaysia) Koo K K (Malaysia) Wong P T	21	21
(Russia) A Nikolaenko (Russia) N Vislova	18	18

Second Round
1	(Indonesia) N Widianto (Indonesia) L Natsir	21	21
(Denmark) L Paaske (Denmark) M Schjoldager	12	12
5/8	(Denmark) T Laybourn (Denmark) K Rytter Juhl	24	21
(Malaysia) Koo K K (Malaysia) Wong P T	22	11

Quarter-finals
1	(Indonesia) N Widianto (Indonesia) L Natsir	21	24
5/8	(Denmark) T Laybourn (Denmark) K Rytter Juhl	16	22

==== Section 2 ====
First Round
PFQ	(Poland) M Łogosz (England) N Munt	21	16	21
(Malaysia) Tan B S (Malaysia) Ooi Y H	17	21	5
Q4	(South Korea) Jeon J-b (South Korea) Kim M-j	20	17
(Poland) R Mateusiak (Poland) N Kostiuczyk	22	21
5/8	(China) Zheng B (China) Gao L	21	21
(Germany) I Kindervater (Germany) K Piotrowski	10	5
(Germany) K Hopp (Germany) B Overzier	18	26	21
(Hong Kong) A T Putra (Hong Kong) Koon W C	21	24	23

Second Round
PFQ	(Poland) M Łogosz (England) N Munt	15	9
(Poland) R Mateusiak (Poland) N Kostiuczyk	21	21
5/8	(China) Zheng B (China) Gao L	21	21
(Hong Kong) A T Putra (Hong Kong) Koon W C	14	12

Quarter-finals
(Poland) R Mateusiak (Poland) N Kostiuczyk	9	12
(China) Zheng B (China) Gao L	21	21

=== Bottom half ===
==== Section 3 ====
First Round
(Singapore) H Saputra (Singapore) Li YJ	13	19
(Denmark) J Rasmussen (Denmark) L Frier Kristiansen	21	21
(Russia) V Durkin (Russia) V Sorokina	19	13
5/8	(China) Zhang J (China) Zhao TT	21	21
Q3	(Denmark) J Fischer Nielsen (Denmark) B Andersen	21	21
(Philippines) Kennevic Asuncion (Philippines) Kennie Asuncion	18	14
(Indonesia) M Rijal (Indonesia) G Polii	17	18
3/4	(England) A Clark (England) D Kellogg	21	21

Second Round
(Denmark) J Rasmussen (Denmark) L Frier Kristiansen	17	17
5/8	(China) Zhang J (China) Zhao TT	21	21
Q3	(Denmark) J Fischer Nielsen (Denmark) B Andersen	7	21	21
3/4	(England) A Clark (England) D Kellogg	21	16	8

Quarter-finals
5/8	(China) Zhang J (China) Zhao TT	12	21	21
Q3	(Denmark) J Fischer Nielsen (Denmark) B Andersen	21	10	23

==== Section 4 ====
First Round
Q1	(Japan) K Masuda (Japan) M Maeda	21	15	15
(England) R Blair (England) J Wallwork	17	21	21
(Australia) D Shirley (Malaysia) J Quay	21	13	11
5/8	(England) N Robertson (England) G Emms	15	21	21
(South Korea) Lee Y-d (South Korea) Hwang Y-m	21	21	14
(Indonesia) F Limpele (Indonesia) V Marissa	23	17	21
(France) S Stoyanov (France) É Eymard	9	18
2	(Thailand) S Prapakamol (Thailand) S Thungthongkam	21	21

Second Round
(England) R Blair (England) J Wallwork	13	21	13
5/8	(England) N Robertson (England) G Emms	21	16	21
(Indonesia) F Limpele (Indonesia) V Marissa	23	21
2	(Thailand) S Prapakamol (Thailand) S Thungthongkam	21	19

Quarter-finals
5/8	(England) N Robertson (England) G Emms	16	21	21
(Indonesia) F Limpele (Indonesia) V Marissa	21	10	13
