= 2007 Swiss Open Super Series =

Tournament details
- Dates: 12 March 2007 – 18 March 2007
- Edition: 46th
- Level: Super Series
- Total prize money: US$200,000
- Venue: St. Jakobshalle
- Location: Basel, Switzerland

Champions
- Men's singles: (China) Chen Jin
- Women's singles: (China) Zhang Ning
- Men's doubles: (Malaysia) Koo Kien Keat (Malaysia) Tan Boon Heong
- Women's doubles: (China) Zhao Tingting (China) Yang Wei
- Mixed doubles: (South Korea) Lee Yong-dae (South Korea) Lee Hyo-jung

The 2007 Swiss Open Super Series (officially known as the Wilson Badminton Swiss Open 2007 for sponsorship reasons) was a badminton tournament which took place at St. Jakobshalle in Basel, Switzerland, from 12 to 18 March 2007 and had a total purse of $200,000.

== Tournament ==
The 2007 Swiss Open Super Series was the fourth tournament of the 2007 BWF Super Series and also part of the Swiss Open championships, which had been held since 1955.

=== Venue ===
This international tournament was held at St. Jakobshalle in Basel, Switzerland.

=== Point distribution ===
Below is the point distribution for each phase of the tournament based on the BWF points system for the BWF Super Series event.

Winner	Runner-up	3/4	5/8	9/16	17/32	33/64	65/128	129/256
9,200	7,800	6,420	5,040	3,600	2,220	880	430	170

=== Prize money ===
The total prize money for this tournament was US$200,000. Distribution of prize money was in accordance with BWF regulations.

Event	Winner	Finalist	Semi-finals	Quarter-finals	Last 16
Men's singles	$16,000	$8,000	$4,000	$2,000	$800
Women's singles	$13,800	$6,600	$3,600	$1,800	—
Men's doubles	$14,400	$8,000	$4,800	$2,800	—
Women's doubles	$12,200	$8,000	$4,400	$2,200	—
Mixed doubles	$12,200	$8,000	$4,400	$2,200	—

== Men's singles ==
=== Seeds ===
1. (China) Lin Dan (semi-finals)
2. (China) Chen Jin (champion)
3. (Denmark) Peter Gade (semi-finals)
4. (Malaysia) Lee Chong Wei (first round)
5. (China) Bao Chunlai (second round)
6. (China) Chen Yu (quarter-finals)
7. (Malaysia) Muhammad Hafiz Hashim (withdrew)
8. (Denmark) Kenneth Jonassen (quarter-finals)

=== Finals ===
Semi-finals
1	(China) Lin Dan	25	0^{r}
Q4	(Indonesia) Simon Santoso	27	5
3/4	(Denmark) Peter Gade	16	19
2	(China) Chen Jin	21	21

Final
Q4	(Indonesia) Simon Santoso	16	10
2	(China) Chen Jin	21	21

=== Top half ===
==== Section 1 ====
First Round
1	(China) Lin D	21	21
Q1	(Finland) V Lång	15	16
(England) A Smith	21	21
(New Zealand) J Moody	14	14
5/8	(China) Bao CL	13	21	21
(Thailand) B Ponsana	21	19	18
(South Korea) Park S-h	12	21	17
(Indonesia) S D Kuncoro	21	16	21

Second Round
1	(China) Lin D	22	21
(England) A Smith	20	14
5/8	(China) Bao CL	5	19
(Indonesia) S D Kuncoro	21	21

Quarter-finals
1	(China) Lin D	21	21
(Indonesia) S D Kuncoro	15	14

==== Section 2 ====
First Round
3/4	(Malaysia) Lee C W	19	21	19
(Singapore) R Susilo	21	12	21
Q4	(Indonesia) S Santoso	21	21
Q2	(Malaysia) Wong C H	16	12
5/8	(China) Chen Y	21	21
(Netherlands) E Pang	18	17
(Denmark) J Persson	21	21
(Malaysia) Yeoh K B	14	18

Second Round
(Singapore) R Susilo	10	16
Q4	(Indonesia) S Santoso	21	21
5/8	(China) Chen Y	21	21
(Denmark) J Persson	10	16

Quarter-finals
Q4	(Indonesia) S Santoso	21	21
5/8	(China) Chen Y	10	12

=== Bottom half ===
==== Section 3 ====
First Round
(Malaysia) Lee T S	21	18	21
(Netherlands) D Palyama	13	21	7
(Malaysia) S A Ayob	22	20
5/8	(Denmark) K Jonassen	24	22
(Malaysia) R Hashim	21	20	21
(Singapore) K Lee Y H	13	22	12
PFQ	(Denmark) K Ødum	12	14
3/4	(Denmark) P Gade	21	21

Second Round
(Malaysia) Lee T S	15	18
5/8	(Denmark) K Jonassen	21	21
(Malaysia) R Hashim	13	11
3/4	(Denmark) P Gade	21	21

Quarter-finals
5/8	(Denmark) K Jonassen	21	13	13
3/4	(Denmark) P Gade	18	21	21

==== Section 4 ====
First Round
Q3	(Austria) J Koch	11	13
(India) C Anand	21	21
(Switzerland) C Bösiger	18	15
PFQ	(Japan) S Satō	21	21
(Wales) R Vaughan	27	13	15
(Poland) P Wacha	25	21	21
(Germany) B Joppien	6	10
2	(China) Chen J	21	21

Second Round
(India) C Anand	14	14
PFQ	(Japan) S Satō	21	21
(Poland) P Wacha	15	21	12
2	(China) Chen J	21	19	21

Quarter-finals
PFQ	(Japan) S Satō	21	17	10
2	(China) Chen J	19	21	21

== Women's singles ==
=== Seeds ===
1. (China) Zhang Ning (champion)
2. (Hong Kong) Wang Chen (first round)
3. (Germany) Xu Huaiwen (semi-finals)
4. (China) Zhu Lin (first round)
5. (China) Lu Lan (final)
6. (Bulgaria) Petya Nedelcheva (first round)
7. (France) Pi Hongyan (quarter-finals)
8. (Netherlands) Yao Jie (quarter-finals)

=== Finals ===
Semi-finals
1	(China) Zhang Ning	21	21
3/4	(Germany) Xu Huaiwen	19	11
5/8	(China) Lu Lan	21	21
(China) Jiang Yanjiao	16	15

Final
1	(China) Zhang Ning	21	21
5/8	(China) Lu Lan	16	18

=== Top half ===
==== Section 1 ====
First Round
1	(China) Zhang N	21	21
(Sweden) S Persson	17	18
(Russia) E Karachkova	16	8
(Australia) Huang C-c	21	21
5/8	(France) Pi HY	21	21	21
(Germany) J Schenk	12	23	13
(Japan) K Mori	19	21	21
(India) A Mutatkar	21	10	15

Second Round
1	(China) Zhang N	21	21
(Australia) Huang C-c	7	14
5/8	(France) Pi HY	21	21
(Japan) K Mori	16	6

Quarter-finals
1	(China) Zhang N	21	10	21
5/8	(France) Pi HY	17	21	15

==== Section 2 ====
First Round
3/4	(Germany) Xu HW	21	21
Q4	(Singapore) Xing AY	14	16
(Japan) E Hirose	21	21
(Netherlands) J Meulendijks	10	7
5/8	(Netherlands) Yao J	21	10	21
(Japan) Y Hirayama	18	21	15
(Hong Kong) Yip P Y	21	21
(India) S Nehwal	19	18

Second Round
3/4	(Germany) Xu HW	21	21
(Japan) E Hirose	16	16
5/8	(Netherlands) Yao J	21	21
(Hong Kong) Yip P Y	16	12

Quarter-finals
3/4	(Germany) Xu HW	22	21
5/8	(Netherlands) Yao J	20	13

=== Bottom half ===
==== Section 3 ====
First Round
(Canada) A Rice	17	7
Q2	(Thailand) S Chansrisukot	21	21
PFQ	(Italy) A Allegrini	16	7
5/8	(China) Lu L	21	21
(Finland) A Nieminen	18	17
(Scotland) S Hughes	21	21
(Singapore) Li L	21	19	21
3/4	(China) Zhu L	17	21	15

Second Round
Q2	(Thailand) S Chansrisukot	13	10
5/8	(China) Lu L	21	21
(Scotland) S Hughes	10	17
(Singapore) Li L	21	21

Quarter-finals
5/8	(China) Lu L	21	24
(Singapore) Li L	11	22

==== Section 4 ====
First Round
(Switzerland) J Cicognini	21	21
(Thailand) M Meemeak	18	16
(China) Jiang YJ	21	21
5/8	(Bulgaria) P Nedelcheva	16	14
Q3	(Thailand) S Ponsana	18	9
(South Korea) Hwang H-y	21	21
(Malaysia) Wong M C	15	24	25
2	(Hong Kong) Wang C	21	22	23

Second Round
(Switzerland) J Cicognini	21	7	15
(China) Jiang YJ	17	21	21
(South Korea) Hwang H-y	21	12	21
(Malaysia) Wong M C	15	21	17

Quarter-finals
(China) Jiang YJ	21	21
(South Korea) Hwang H-y	14	18

== Men's doubles ==
=== Seeds ===
1. (China) Fu Haifeng / Cai Yun (quarter-finals)
2. (Denmark) Jens Eriksen / Martin Lundgaard Hansen (final)
3. (Malaysia) Choong Tan Fook / Lee Wan Wah (first round)
4. (South Korea) Jung Jae-sung / Lee Yong-dae (second round)
5. (England) Anthony Clark / Robert Blair (first round)
6. (Malaysia) Koo Kien Keat / Tan Boon Heong (champions)
7. (South Korea) Lee Jae-jin / Hwang Ji-man (quarter-finals)
8. (Indonesia) Candra Wijaya / (United States) Tony Gunawan (semi-finals)

=== Finals ===
Semi-finals
5/8	(Malaysia) Koo Kien Keat (Malaysia) Tan Boon Heong	23	13	21
5/8	(Indonesia) Candra Wijaya (United States) Tony Gunawan	21	21	7
(Indonesia) Rian Sukmawan (Indonesia) Eng Hian	21	15	18
2	(Denmark) Jens Eriksen (Denmark) Martin Lundgaard Hansen	18	21	21

Final
5/8	(Malaysia) Koo Kien Keat (Malaysia) Tan Boon Heong	17	21	21
2	(Denmark) Jens Eriksen (Denmark) Martin Lundgaard Hansen	21	16	12

=== Top half ===
==== Section 1 ====
First Round
1	(China) Fu HF (China) Cai Y	21	21
(Sweden) I Hirschfeldt (Indonesia) I Sodikin Irawan	14	9
(Poland) M Łogosz (Poland) R Mateusiak	22	21
(France) S Stoyanov (France) M Popov	20	18
5/8	(Malaysia) Koo K K (Malaysia) Tan B H	21	21
PFQ	(Thailand) S Anugritayawon (Thailand) S Prapakamol	9	10
(Chinese Taipei) Chein Y-h (Chinese Taipei) Lin Y-l	21	19	21
Q3	(Germany) K Hopp (Germany) I Kindervater	17	21	16

Second Round
1	(China) Fu HF (China) Cai Y	21	21
(Poland) M Łogosz (Poland) R Mateusiak	12	16
5/8	(Malaysia) Koo K K (Malaysia) Tan B H	21	14	21
Q3	(Chinese Taipei) Chein Y-h (Chinese Taipei) Lin Y-l	15	21	7

Quarter-finals
1	(China) Fu HF (China) Cai Y	16	21	13
5/8	(Malaysia) Koo K K (Malaysia) Tan B H	21	11	21

==== Section 2 ====
First Round
3/4	(South Korea) Jung J-s (South Korea) Lee Y-d	21	21
(Germany) R Spitko (Germany) M Fuchs	15	14
PFQ	(Thailand) N Narkthong (Thailand) P Ngernsrisuk	18	17
(Indonesia) H A Gunawan (Indonesia) J Riyadi	21	21
5/8	(Indonesia) C Wijaya (United States) T Gunawan	21	21
(Japan) T Ōtsuka (Japan) K Masuda	11	10
(Malaysia) Gan T C (Malaysia) M Z Abdul Latif	19	17
(Denmark) L Paaske (Denmark) J Rasmussen	21	21

Second Round
3/4	(South Korea) Jung J-s (South Korea) Lee Y-d	19	17
(Indonesia) H A Gunawan (Indonesia) J Riyadi	21	21
5/8	(Indonesia) C Wijaya (United States) T Gunawan	21	17	21
(Denmark) L Paaske (Denmark) J Rasmussen	16	21	18

Quarter-finals
(Indonesia) H A Gunawan (Indonesia) J Riyadi	19	8
5/8	(Indonesia) C Wijaya (United States) T Gunawan	21	21

=== Bottom half ===
==== Section 3 ====
First Round
Q1	(England) D Lindley (England) C Langridge	18	22
(Denmark) S Mollyhus (Denmark) A Kristiansen	21	24
Q4	(India) R Kumar K. T. (India) S Thomas	16	21	13
5/8	(South Korea) Lee J-j (South Korea) Hwang J-m	21	17	21
PFQ	(Russia) V Durkin (Russia) A Nikolaenko	21	15	21
(Malaysia) Tan B S (Malaysia) Ong S H	17	21	17
(Indonesia) R Sukmawan (Indonesia) E Hian	22	21
3/4	(Malaysia) Choong T F (Malaysia) Lee W W	20	17

Second Round
(Denmark) S Mollyhus (Denmark) A Kristiansen	14	14
5/8	(South Korea) Lee J-j (South Korea) Hwang J-m	21	21
PFQ	(Russia) V Durkin (Russia) A Nikolaenko	21	13	8
(Indonesia) R Sukmawan (Indonesia) E Hian	19	21	21

Quarter-finals
5/8	(South Korea) Lee J-j (South Korea) Hwang J-m	18	17
(Indonesia) R Sukmawan (Indonesia) E Hian	21	21

==== Section 4 ====
First Round
(Japan) N Kawamae (Japan) K Kawaguchi	14	14
(South Korea) Yoo Y-s (South Korea) Han S-h	21	21
Q2	(Malaysia) Chan C M (Malaysia) Hoon T H	21	21
5/8	(England) A Clark (England) R Blair	14	11
(Australia) G Warfe (Australia) R Smith	21	13	13
(Singapore) H Saputra (Singapore) H Wijaya	16	21	21
(Wales) M Hughes (Wales) M Lewis	16	18
2	(Denmark) J Eriksen (Denmark) M Lundgaard Hansen	21	21

Second Round
(South Korea) Yoo Y-s (South Korea) Han S-h	13	21	21
Q2	(Malaysia) Chan C M (Malaysia) Hoon T H	21	18	23
(Singapore) H Saputra (Singapore) H Wijaya	12	18
2	(Denmark) J Eriksen (Denmark) M Lundgaard Hansen	21	21

Quarter-finals
Q2	(Malaysia) Chan C M (Malaysia) Hoon T H	20	17
2	(Denmark) J Eriksen (Denmark) M Lundgaard Hansen	22	21

== Women's doubles ==
=== Seeds ===
1. (China) Gao Ling / Huang Sui (withdrew)
2. (China) Zhang Yawen / Wei Yili (second round)
3. (Chinese Taipei) Chien Yu-chin / Cheng Wen-hsing (semi-finals)
4. (Malaysia) Wong Pei Tty / Chin Eei Hui (withdrew)
5. (England) Gail Emms / Donna Kellogg (second round)
6. (Singapore) Jiang Yanmei / Li Yujia (quarter-finals)
7. (South Korea) Lee Kyung-won / Lee Hyo-jung (final)
8. (China) Zhao Tingting / Yang Wei (champions)

=== Finals ===
Semi-finals
5/8	(China) Zhao Tingting (China) Yang Wei	21	21
3/4	(Chinese Taipei) Chien Yu-chin (Chinese Taipei) Cheng Wen-hsing	14	19
(Indonesia) Greysia Polii (Indonesia) Vita Marissa	14	21	13
5/8	(South Korea) Lee Kyung-won (South Korea) Lee Hyo-jung	21	14	21

Final
5/8	(China) Zhao Tingting (China) Yang Wei	21	21
5/8	(South Korea) Lee Kyung-won (South Korea) Lee Hyo-jung	15	10

=== Top half ===
==== Section 1 ====
First Round
PFQ	(South Korea) Hoon S-j (South Korea) Jung Y-k	21	21
(Malaysia) Mooi H Y (Malaysia) Ooi Y H	4	10
(Japan) A Akao (Japan) T Matsuda	21	21
(Malaysia) Lim P S (Malaysia) J Quay	9	12
5/8	(China) Zhao TT (China) Yang W	21	21
Q3	(Netherlands) R van Cutsen (Netherlands) P van Dooremalen	10	14
PFQ	(Germany) C Mette (Germany) B Overzier	21	19	11
(South Korea) Hwang Y-m (South Korea) Kim M-j	17	21	21

Second Round
PFQ	(South Korea) Hoon S-j (South Korea) Jung Y-k	12	21	7
(Japan) A Akao (Japan) T Matsuda	21	17	21
5/8	(China) Zhao TT (China) Yang W	21	21
(South Korea) Hwang Y-m (South Korea) Kim M-j	9	10

Quarter-finals
(Japan) A Akao (Japan) T Matsuda	21	15	13
5/8	(China) Zhao TT (China) Yang W	18	21	21

==== Section 2 ====
First Round
3/4	(Chinese Taipei) Chien Y-c (Chinese Taipei) Chen W-h	17	21	21
(Japan) M Maeda (Japan) S Suetsuna	21	16	12
(Russia) N Vislova (Russia) V Sorokina	24	21
(England) J Nicholas (England) N Munt	22	8
5/8	(Singapore) Jiang YM (Singapore) Li YJ	21	22
(Russia) A Russkikh (Russia) E Ananina	19	20
(Indonesia) E Nursugianti (Indonesia) R Mundiasti	21	21
(India) S Kurien (India) J Gutta	14	18

Second Round
3/4	(Chinese Taipei) Chien Y-c (Chinese Taipei) Chen W-h	21	21
(Russia) N Vislova (Russia) V Sorokina	17	8
5/8	(Singapore) Jiang YM (Singapore) Li YJ	21	21
(Indonesia) E Nursugianti (Indonesia) R Mundiasti	16	15

Quarter-finals
3/4	(Chinese Taipei) Chien Y-c (Chinese Taipei) Chen W-h	21	21
5/8	(Singapore) Jiang YM (Singapore) Li YJ	16	17

=== Bottom half ===
==== Section 3 ====
First Round
(Indonesia) G Polii (Indonesia) V Marissa	w	/	o
Q4	(Malaysia) Fong C Y (Malaysia) See P L
(France) É Eymard (France) W Rahmawati	10	16
5/8	(England) G Emms (England) D Kellogg	21	21
Q1	(Switzerland) S Jaquet (Switzerland) C Jörg	20	16
(Germany) N Grether (Germany) J Schenk	22	21
PFQ	(Sweden) E Bergblom (Sweden) H Persson	w	/	o
3/4	(Malaysia) Wong P T (Malaysia) Chin E H

Second Round
(Indonesia) G Polii (Indonesia) V Marissa	21	21
5/8	(England) G Emms (England) D Kellogg	15	15
(Germany) N Grether (Germany) J Schenk	21	21
PFQ	(Sweden) E Bergblom (Sweden) H Persson	16	14

Quarter-finals
(Indonesia) G Polii (Indonesia) V Marissa	21	21
(Germany) N Grether (Germany) J Schenk	11	10

==== Section 4 ====
First Round
(Bulgaria) P Nedelcheva (Bulgaria) D Dimova	19	21	21
(Canada) F McKee (Canada) C Reid	21	6	8
Q3	(Australia) S Dobson (Australia) T Luiz	12	11
5/8	(South Korea) Lee K-w (South Korea) Lee H-j	21	21
(Scotland) I Bankier (Scotland) E Mason	13	17
(Thailand) D Aroonkesorn (Thailand) K Voravichitchaikul	21	21
(Poland) K Augustyn (Poland) N Kostiuczyk	13	18
2	(China) Zhang YW (China) Wei YL	21	21

Second Round
(Bulgaria) P Nedelcheva (Bulgaria) D Dimova	10	14
5/8	(South Korea) Lee K-w (South Korea) Lee H-j	21	21
(Thailand) D Aroonkesorn (Thailand) K Voravichitchaikul	w	/	o
2	(China) Zhang YW (China) Wei YL

Quarter-finals
5/8	(South Korea) Lee K-w (South Korea) Lee H-j	21	21
(Thailand) D Aroonkesorn (Thailand) K Voravichitchaikul	13	15

== Mixed doubles ==
=== Seeds ===
1. (Indonesia) Nova Widianto / Liliyana Natsir (withdrew)
2. (China) Xie Zhongbo / Zhang Yawen (quarter-finals)
3. (England) Nathan Robertson / Gail Emms (withdrew)
4. (Denmark) Thomas Laybourn / Kamilla Rytter Juhl (withdrew)
5. (England) Anthony Clark / Donna Kellogg (first round)
6. (Poland) Robert Mateusiak / Nadieżda Kostiuczyk (semi-finals)
7. (South Korea) Lee Yong-dae / Lee Hyo-jung (champions)
8. (Singapore) Hendri Saputra / Li Yujia (quarter-finals)

=== Finals ===
Semi-finals
PFQ	(Singapore) Hendra Wijaya (Singapore) Jiang Yanmei	12	12
(Indonesia) Muhammad Rijal (Indonesia) Greysia Polii	21	21
5/8	(Poland) Robert Mateusiak (Poland) Nadieżda Kostiuczyk	18	21	17
5/8	(South Korea) Lee Yong-dae (South Korea) Lee Hyo-jung	21	11	21

Final
(Indonesia) Muhammad Rijal (Indonesia) Greysia Polii	21	16	18
5/8	(South Korea) Lee Yong-dae (South Korea) Lee Hyo-jung	14	21	21

=== Top half ===
==== Section 1 ====
First Round
PFQ	(Singapore) H Wijaya (Singapore) Jiang YM	21	13	21
Q2	(Japan) K Masuda (Japan) M Maeda	16	21	17
(Thailand) S Anugritayawon (Thailand) K Voravichitchaikul	16	21	21
(New Zealand) D Shirley (Malaysia) J Quay	21	16	12
5/8	(Singapore) H Saputra (Singapore) Li YJ	21	21
(France) S Stoyanov (France) É Eymard	16	12
(Australia) G Warfe (Australia) S Dobson	8	11
(Russia) A Nikolaenko (Russia) N Vislova	21	21

Second Round
PFQ	(Singapore) H Wijaya (Singapore) Jiang YM	21	21
(Thailand) S Anugritayawon (Thailand) K Voravichitchaikul	17	16
5/8	(Singapore) H Saputra (Singapore) Li YJ	21	21
(Russia) A Nikolaenko (Russia) N Vislova	14	15

Quarter-finals
PFQ	(Singapore) H Wijaya (Singapore) Jiang YM	w	/	o
5/8	(Singapore) H Saputra (Singapore) Li YJ

==== Section 2 ====
First Round
PFQ	(Poland) M Łogosz (England) N Munt	17	18
(Indonesia) M Rijal (Indonesia) G Polii	21	21
(Germany) K Hopp (Germany) B Overzier	21	25
(South Korea) Hwang J-m (South Korea) Jung Y-k	17	23
5/8	(England) A Clark (England) D Kellogg	19	21	15
(South Korea) Han S-h (South Korea) Hwang Y-m	21	17	21
Q3	(South Korea) Yoo Y-s (South Korea) Kim M-j	8	21	21
(Denmark) J Rasmussen (Denmark) L Frier Kristiansen	21	12	18

Second Round
(Indonesia) M Rijal (Indonesia) G Polii	21	21
(Germany) K Hopp (Germany) B Overzier	11	13
(South Korea) Han S-h (South Korea) Hwang Y-m	21	21
Q3	(South Korea) Yoo Y-s (South Korea) Kim M-j	12	16

Quarter-finals
(Indonesia) M Rijal (Indonesia) G Polii	21	21
(South Korea) Han S-h (South Korea) Hwang Y-m	13	13

=== Bottom half ===
==== Section 3 ====
First Round
(Germany) I Kindervater (Germany) K Piotrowski	21	14	18
(Denmark) J Houmann (Denmark) J Chemnitz	17	21	21
PFQ	(Australia) R Smith (Australia) T Luiz	10	16
5/8	(Poland) R Mateusiak (Poland) N Kostiuczyk	21	21
(Denmark) J Eriksen (Denmark) H Nielsen	22	21
(Germany) T Dettmann (Germany) A Lillie	20	11
Q1	(Malaysia) M Z Abdul Latif (Malaysia) Woon K W	9	8
PFQ	(Denmark) L Paaske (Denmark) M Schjoldager	21	21

Second Round
(Denmark) J Houmann (Denmark) J Chemnitz	12	10
5/8	(Poland) R Mateusiak (Poland) N Kostiuczyk	21	21
(Denmark) J Eriksen (Denmark) H Nielsen	21	14	21
PFQ	(Denmark) L Paaske (Denmark) M Schjoldager	17	21	17

Quarter-finals
5/8	(Poland) R Mateusiak (Poland) N Kostiuczyk	21	21
(Denmark) J Eriksen (Denmark) H Nielsen	12	17

==== Section 4 ====
First Round
(Russia) V Durkin (Russia) V Sorokina	21	21
(China) Zhang J (China) Zhao TT	19	16
(Malaysia) Koo K K (Malaysia) Wong P T	17	21	15
5/8	(South Korea) Lee Y-d (South Korea) Lee H-j	21	18	21
(Scotland) W Briggs (Scotland) I Bankier	21	18	8
(Chinese Taipei) Hsieh Y-h (Chinese Taipei) Chien Y-c	19	21	21
Q4	(England) C Langridge (England) J Nicholas	11	12
2	(China) Xie ZB (China) Zhang YW	21	21

Second Round
(Russia) V Durkin (Russia) V Sorokina	6	11
5/8	(South Korea) Lee Y-d (South Korea) Lee H-j	21	21
(Chinese Taipei) Hsieh Y-h (Chinese Taipei) Chien Y-c	14	15
2	(China) Xie ZB (China) Zhang YW	21	21

Quarter-finals
5/8	(South Korea) Lee Y-d (South Korea) Lee H-j	13	21	21
2	(China) Xie ZB (China) Zhang YW	21	17	12
