= 2007 French Super Series =

Tournament details
- Dates: October 30, 2007 - November 4, 2007
- Total prize money: US$200,000
- Venue: Stade Pierre de Coubertin
- Location: Paris, France

The 2007 French Super Series is the tenth tournament of the 2007 BWF Super Series in badminton. It was held in Paris, France from October 30 to November 4, 2007.

== Men's singles ==
=== Seeds ===
1. (China) Lin Dan
2. (Malaysia) Lee Chong Wei
3. (China) Chen Jin
4. (China) Bao Chunlai
5. (China) Chen Yu
6. (China) Chen Hong
7. (Denmark) Peter Gade
8. (Indonesia) Taufik Hidayat

=== Results ===
1st Round
1	(China) Lin Dan	21	17	21
(Indonesia) Sony Dwi Kuncoro	18	21	7
(South Korea) Park Sung-hwan	21	21
(Malaysia) Wong Choong Hann	12	16
8	(Indonesia) Taufik Hidayat	21	13	21
PFQ	(Canada) Andrew Dabeka	17	21	19
(Malaysia) Yeoh Kay Bin	11	25
(Poland) Przemysław Wacha	21	27
4	(China) Bao Chunlai	21	21
Q1	(Thailand) Poompat Sapkulchananart	10	17
(Malaysia) Roslin Hashim	10	15
(Japan) Shoji Sato	21	21
6	(China) Chen Hong	22	21	12
(Thailand) Boonsak Ponsana	24	13	21
PFQ	(Netherlands) Eric Pang	21	20	16
(Malaysia) Sairul Amar Ayob	19	22	21
(Singapore) Lee Yen Hui Kendrick	21	21
Q3	(Germany) Bjoern Joppien	9	15
(Singapore) Ronald Susilo	13	18
7	(Denmark) Peter Gade	21	21
(Hong Kong) Ng Wei	21	21
(England) Andrew Smith	13	13
Q2	(England) Rajiv Ouseph	5	8
3	(China) Chen Jin	21	21
PFQ	(Denmark) Joachim Persson	8	11
(Malaysia) Muhammad Hafiz Hashim	21	21
(Hong Kong) Chan Yan Kit	21	21
PFQ	(New Zealand) John Moody	11	11
(Indonesia) Simon Santoso	21	15	21
Q4	(South Korea) Lee Hyun-il	18	21	15
(Denmark) Kenneth Jonassen	14	11
2	(Malaysia) Lee Chong Wei	21	21

2nd Round
(China) Lin Dan	21	21
(South Korea) Park Sung-hwan	18	10
(Indonesia) Taufik Hidayat	22	21
(Poland) Przemysław Wacha	20	16
(China) Bao Chunlai	21	21
(Japan) Shoji Sato	16	10
(Thailand) Boonsak Ponsana	21	21
(Malaysia) Sairul Amar Ayob	10	11
(Singapore) Lee Yen Hui Kendrick	16	17
(Denmark) Peter Gade	21	21
(Hong Kong) Ng Wei	14	21	12
(China) Chen Jin	21	18	21
(Malaysia) Muhammad Hafiz Hashim	22	19
(Hong Kong) Chan Yan Kit	24	21
(Indonesia) Simon Santoso	12	16
(Malaysia) Lee Chong Wei	21	21

Quarterfinals
(China) Lin Dan	21	22
(Indonesia) Taufik Hidayat	14	20
(China) Bao Chunlai	21	21
(Thailand) Boonsak Ponsana	17	12
(Denmark) Peter Gade	15	21	19
(China) Chen Jin	21	15	21
(Hong Kong) Chan Yan Kit	10	12
(Malaysia) Lee Chong Wei	21	21

Semifinals
(China) Lin Dan	14	21	17
(China) Bao Chunlai	21	7	21
(China) Chen Jin	8	8
(Malaysia) Lee Chong Wei	21	21

Finals
(China) Bao Chunlai	11	14
(Malaysia) Lee Chong Wei	21	21

== Women's singles ==
=== Seeds ===
1. (China) Xie Xingfang
2. (China) Zhang Ning
3. (China) Zhu Lin
4. (China) Lu Lan
5. (Hong Kong) Wang Chen
6. (France) Pi Hongyan
7. (Germany) Xu Huaiwen
8. (Netherlands) Yao Jie

=== Results ===
1st round
1	(China) Xie Xingfang	21	21
Q2	(Thailand) Salakjit Ponsana	11	16
(Denmark) Tine Rasmussen	21	21
(Indonesia) Adriyanti Firdasari	17	18
7	(Germany) Xu Huaiwen	21	21
(Chinese Taipei) Cheng Shao-chieh	12	7
(England) Tracey Hallam	15	21	13
(Japan) Eriko Hirose	21	18	21
3	(China) Zhu Lin	21	15	17
(Russia) Ella Diehl	19	21	21
(Finland) Anu Nieminen	20	21	17
(Netherlands) Judith Meulendijks	22	17	21
5	(Hong Kong) Wang Chen	14	8
(Malaysia) Wong Mew Choo	21	21
(Bulgaria) Petya Nedelcheva	14	15
(Canada) Anna Rice	21	21
(Japan) Kaori Mori	11	21	20
(Germany) Juliane Schenk	21	18	22
(Indonesia) Maria Kristin Yulianti	21	13	12
6	(France) Pi Hongyan	17	21	21
(Sweden) Sara Persson	6	16
Q1	(South Korea) Lee Yun-hwa	21	21
(South Korea) Hwang Hye-youn	17	12
4	(China) Lu Lan	21	21
Q3	(Ukraine) Larisa Griga	14	22	21
(Singapore) Li Li	21	20	18
(Hong Kong) Yip Pui Yin	21	21
8	(Netherlands) Yao Jie	12	19
(China) Jiang Yanjiao	17	12
(Hong Kong) Zhou Mi	21	21
Q4	(Scotland) Susan Hughes	10	7
2	(China) Zhang Ning	21	21

2nd round
(China) Xie Xingfang	23	10	21
(Denmark) Tine Rasmussen	21	21	5
(Germany) Xu Huaiwen	21	21
(Japan) Eriko Hirose	16	7
(Russia) Ella Diehl	21	21
(Netherlands) Judith Meulendijks	13	13
(Malaysia) Wong Mew Choo	16	21	21
(Canada) Anna Rice	21	9	16
(Germany) Juliane Schenk	8	14
(France) Pi Hongyan	21	21
(South Korea) Lee Yun-hwa	15	19
(China) Lu Lan	21	21
(Ukraine) Larisa Griga	13	20
(Hong Kong) Yip Pui Yin	21	22
(Hong Kong) Zhou Mi	13	21	19
(China) Zhang Ning	21	10	21

Quarterfinals
(China) Xie Xingfang	21	21
(Germany) Xu Huaiwen	16	12
(Russia) Ella Diehl	19	23	19
(Malaysia) Wong Mew Choo	21	21	21
(France) Pi Hongyan	9	22	21
(China) Lu Lan	21	20	12
(Hong Kong) Yip Pui Yin	11	12
(China) Zhang Ning	21	21

Semifinals
(China) Xie Xingfang	21	21
(Malaysia) Wong Mew Choo	11	19
Finals
(China) Xie Xingfang	21	21
(France) Pi Hongyan	13	13
(France) Pi Hongyan	21	21
(China) Zhang Ning	19	19

== Men's doubles ==
=== Seeds ===
1. (Malaysia) Koo Kien Keat / Tan Boon Heong
2. (China) Fu Haifeng / Cai Yun
3. (Indonesia) Markis Kido / Hendra Setiawan
4. (South Korea) Jung Jae-sung / Lee Yong-dae
5. (Malaysia) Choong Tan Fook / Lee Wan Wah
6. (Denmark) Jens Eriksen / Martin Lundgaard Hansen
7. (Indonesia) Luluk Hadiyanto / Alvent Yulianto
8. (Denmark) Lars Paaske / Jonas Rasmussen

=== Results ===
Quarterfinals
(Malaysia) Koo Kien Keat (Malaysia) Tan Boon Heong	21	18	18
(Japan) Tadashi Ohtsuka (Japan) Keita Masuda	16	21	21
(Indonesia) Markis Kido (Indonesia) Hendra Setiawan	21	13
(Malaysia) Choong Tan Fook (Malaysia) Lee Wan Wah	23	21
(Thailand) Sudket Prapakamol (Thailand) Phattapol Ngensrisuk	16	16
(South Korea) Jung Jae-sung (South Korea) Lee Yong-dae	21	21
(Indonesia) Luluk Hadiyanto (Indonesia) Alvent Yulianto	21	18	16
(China) Fu Haifeng (China) Cai Yun	18	21	21

Semifinals
(Japan) Tadashi Ohtsuka (Japan) Keita Masuda	17	11
(Malaysia) Choong Tan Fook (Malaysia) Lee Wan Wah	21	21
(South Korea) Jung Jae-sung (South Korea) Lee Yong-dae	17	13
(China) Fu Haifeng (China) Cai Yun	21	21

Finals
(Malaysia) Choong Tan Fook (Malaysia) Lee Wan Wah	14	19
(China) Fu Haifeng (China) Cai Yun	21	21

== Women's doubles ==
=== Seeds ===
1. (China) Zhang Yawen / Wei Yili
2. (China) Yang Wei / Zhang Jiewen
3. (South Korea) Lee Kyung-won / Lee Hyo-jung
4. (Chinese Taipei) Chien Yu Chin / Cheng Wen-Hsing
5. (China) Zhao Tingting / Yu Yang
6. (Japan) Kumiko Ogura / Reiko Shiota
7. (Singapore) Jiang Yanmei / Li Yujia
8. (England) Gail Emms / Donna Kellogg

=== Results ===
Quarterfinals
(China) Zhang Yawen (China) Wei Yili	21	21
(Singapore) Jiang Yanmei (Singapore) Li Yujia	12	11
(Chinese Taipei) Chien Yu Chin (Chinese Taipei) Cheng Wen-Hsing	16	23	21
(Japan) Kumiko Ogura (Japan) Reiko Shiota	21	21	18
(Indonesia) Jo Novita (Indonesia) Greysia Polii	18	21	21
(Japan) Aki Akao (Japan) Tomomi Matsuda	21	19	14
(China) Zhao Tingting (China) Yu Yang	WO
(China) Yang Wei (China) Zhang Jiewen

Semifinals
(China) Zhang Yawen (China) Wei Yili	21	19	21
(Chinese Taipei) Chien Yu Chin (Chinese Taipei) Cheng Wen-Hsing	17	21	12
(Indonesia) Jo Novita (Indonesia) Greysia Polii	14	9
(China) Zhao Tingting (China) Yu Yang	21	21

Finals
(China) Zhang Yawen (China) Wei Yili	21	21
(China) Zhao Tingting (China) Yu Yang	10	15

== Mixed doubles ==
=== Seeds ===
1. (China) Gao Ling / Zheng Bo
2. (Indonesia) Lilyana Natsir / Nova Widianto
3. (China) Zhang Yawen / Xie Zhongbo
4. (Indonesia) Vita Marissa / Flandy Limpele
5. (England) Gail Emms / Nathan Robertson
6. (Denmark) Kamilla Rytter Juhl / Thomas Laybourn
7. (England) Donna Kellogg / Anthony Clark
8. (China) Yu Yang / He Hanbin

=== Results ===
Quarterfinals
(China) Zheng Bo (China) Gao Ling	21	21
(Poland) Robert Mateusiak (Poland) Nadieżda Kostiuczyk	16	19
(China) Xie Zhongbo (China) Zhang Yawen	21	21
(England) Nathan Robertson (England) Gail Emms	12	11
(South Korea) Lee Jae-jin (South Korea) Hwang Ji-man	15	9
(Indonesia) Flandy Limpele (Indonesia) Vita Marissa	21	21
(Denmark) Thomas Laybourn (Denmark) Kamilla Rytter Juhl	22	21
(Indonesia) Nova Widianto (Indonesia) Lilyana Natsir	20	17

Semifinals
(China) Zheng Bo (China) Gao Ling	7	0
(China) Xie Zhongbo (China) Zhang Yawen	21	3
(Indonesia) Flandy Limpele (Indonesia) Vita Marissa	21	21
(Denmark) Thomas Laybourn (Denmark) Kamilla Rytter Juhl	19	8

Finals
(China) Xie Zhongbo (China) Zhang Yawen	11	15
(Indonesia) Flandy Limpele (Indonesia) Vita Marissa	21	21
