= 2007 Singapore Super Series =

2007 Singapore Open Super Series
Tournament details
- Dates: 1 May 2007– 6 May 2007
- Edition: 58th
- Level: Super Series
- Total prize money: US$200,000
- Venue: Singapore Indoor Stadium
- Location: Kallang, Singapore

Champions
- Men's singles: (Thailand) Boonsak Ponsana
- Women's singles: (China) Zhang Ning
- Men's doubles: (China) Cai Yun (China) Fu Haifeng
- Women's doubles: (China) Wei Yili (China) Zhang Yawen
- Mixed doubles: (Indonesia) Flandy Limpele (Indonesia) Vita Marissa

The 2007 Singapore Open Super Series (officially known as the Aviva Open Singapore Super Series 2007 for sponsorship reasons) was a badminton tournament which took place at Singapore Indoor Stadium in Singapore, from 1 to 6 May 2007 and had a total purse of $200,000.

== Tournament ==
The 2007 Singapore Open Super Series was the fifth tournament of the 2007 BWF Super Series and also part of the Singapore Open championships, which had been held since 1929. This was also the first tournament that offered valuable ranking points for the qualification to the 2008 Summer Olympic Games.

=== Venue ===
This international tournament was held at Singapore Indoor Stadium in Singapore.

=== Point distribution ===
Below is the point distribution for each phase of the tournament based on the BWF points system for the BWF Super Series event.

Winner	Runner-up	3/4	5/8	9/16	17/32	33/64	65/128	129/256
9,200	7,800	6,420	5,040	3,600	2,220	880	430	170

=== Prize money ===
The total prize money for this tournament was US$200,000. Distribution of prize money was in accordance with BWF regulations.

Event	Winner	Finalist	Semi-finals	Quarter-finals	Last 16
Men's singles	$16,000	$8,000	$4,000	$2,000	$800
Women's singles	$13,800	$6,600	$3,600	$1,800	—
Men's doubles	$14,400	$8,000	$4,800	$2,800	—
Women's doubles	$12,200	$8,000	$4,400	$2,200	—
Mixed doubles	$12,200	$8,000	$4,400	$2,200	—

== Men's singles ==
=== Seeds ===
1. (China) Lin Dan (quarter-finals)
2. (China) Bao Chunlai (withdrew)
3. (China) Chen Jin (second round)
4. (Denmark) Peter Gade (semi-finals)
5. (China) Chen Hong (first round)
6. (Malaysia) Lee Chong Wei (first round)
7. (China) Chen Yu (final)
8. (Denmark) Kenneth Jonassen (quarter-finals)

=== Finals ===
Semi-finals
(Thailand) Boonsak Ponsana	21	21
(Singapore) Ronald Susilo	13	15
4	(Denmark) Peter Gade	15	25	17
7	(China) Chen Yu	21	23	21

Final
(Thailand) Boonsak Ponsana	21	21
7	(China) Chen Yu	17	14

=== Top half ===
==== Section 1 ====
First Round
1	(China) Lin D	21	13	21
(Hong Kong) Chan Y K	18	21	15
(Indonesia) S Santoso	23	21
(New Zealand) J Moody	21	11
6	(Malaysia) Lee C W	21	18	20
(Malaysia) M H Hashim	16	21	22
(Thailand) B Ponsana	21	21
Q2	(Indonesia) A Yunus	19	17

Second Round
1	(China) Lin D	21	22
(Indonesia) S Santoso	14	20
(Malaysia) M H Hashim	14	13
(Thailand) B Ponsana	21	21

Quarter-finals
1	(China) Lin D	17	21	21
(Thailand) B Ponsana	21	7	23

==== Section 2 ====
First Round
3	(China) Chen J	21	21
(Germany) B Joppien	11	19
Q1	(Malaysia) Tan C S	13	12
(Singapore) K Lee Y H	21	21
5	(China) Chen H	11	21	17
(Indonesia) S D Kuncoro	21	9	21
(Malaysia) Lee T S	16	15
(Singapore) R Susilo	21	21

Second Round
3	(China) Chen J	21	16	21
(Singapore) K Lee Y H	16	21	23
(Indonesia) S D Kuncoro	13	10
(Singapore) R Susilo	21	21

Quarter-finals
(Singapore) K Lee Y H	13	21	10
(Singapore) R Susilo	21	16	21

=== Bottom half ===
==== Section 3 ====
First Round
(Hong Kong) Ng W	21	21
(Netherlands) D Palyama	14	10
(Netherlands) E Pang	21	8	5
8	(Denmark) K Jonassen	16	21	21
Q2	(Malaysia) M A Abdul Latif	15	21	12
(Indonesia) T Hidayat	21	16	21
PFQ	(Malaysia) I Saman	14	12
4	(Denmark) P Gade	21	21

Second Round
(Hong Kong) Ng W	21	3	9
8	(Denmark) K Jonassen	10	21	21
(Indonesia) T Hidayat	18	12
4	(Denmark) P Gade	21	21

Quarter-finals
8	(Denmark) K Jonassen	21	17	19
4	(Denmark) P Gade	13	21	21

==== Section 4 ====
First Round
PFQ	(Malaysia) Kuan B H	23	21
(England) A Smith	21	9
(Malaysia) S A Ayob	8	10
7	(China) Chen Y	21	21
(Wales) R Vaughan	18	16
Q4	(Malaysia) Wong C H	21	21
(Japan) S Satō	21	21
PFQ	(Czech Republic) J Fröhlich	13	7

Second Round
PFQ	(Malaysia) Kuan B H	20	15
7	(China) Chen Y	22	21
Q4	(Malaysia) Wong C H	21	21
PFQ	(Japan) S Satō	16	18

Quarter-finals
7	(China) Chen Y	21	21
Q4	(Malaysia) Wong C H	17	15

== Women's singles ==
=== Seeds ===
1. (China) Xie Xingfang (final)
2. (China) Zhang Ning (champion)
3. (China) Zhu Lin (first round)
4. (Germany) Huaiwen Xu (semi-finals)
5. (China) Lu Lan (first round)
6. (France) Pi Hongyan (quarter-finals)
7. (Netherlands) Yao Jie (first round)
8. (Hong Kong) Wang Chen (quarter-finals)

=== Finals ===
Semi-finals
1	(China) Xie Xingfang	21	21
4	(Germany) Huaiwen Xu	10	4
(Japan) Eriko Hirose	11	12
2	(China) Zhang Ning	21	21

Final
1	(China) Xie Xingfang	18	21	3
2	(China) Zhang Ning	21	19	21

=== Top half ===
==== Section 1 ====
First Round
1	(China) Xie XF	21	18	21
(Finland) A Nieminen	16	21	8
Q4	(Malaysia) L Cheah	10	21	18
(Sweden) S Persson	21	14	21
5	(China) Lu L	16	14
(Malaysia) Wong M C	21	21
PFQ	(Canada) A Rice	12	15
(Denmark) T Rasmussen	21	21

Second Round
1	(China) Xie XF	21	21
(Sweden) S Persson	9	13
(Malaysia) Wong M C	16	19
(Denmark) T Rasmussen	21	21

Quarter-finals
1	(China) Xie XF	21	18	21
(Denmark) T Rasmussen	12	21	11

==== Section 2 ====
First Round
4	(Germany) HW Xu	21	21
(Singapore) Xing AY	13	15
(Australia) Huang C-c	17	21	21
(Japan) Y Hirayama	21	10	18
7	(Netherlands) Yao J	19	18
(Hong Kong) Yip P Y	21	21
(Germany) J Schenk	21	15	16
Q1	(Chinese Taipei) Cheng S-c	19	21	21

Second Round
4	(Germany) HW Xu	21	21
(Australia) Huang C-c	10	13
(Hong Kong) Yip P Y	11	11
Q1	(Chinese Taipei) Cheng S-c	21	21

Quarter-finals
4	(Germany) HW Xu	19	22	21
Q1	(Chinese Taipei) Cheng S-c	21	20	18

=== Bottom half ===
==== Section 3 ====
First Round
(Indonesia) M K Yulianti	18	21	21
(Russia) E Karachkova	21	17	17
(Malaysia) J Wong P X	21	15	15
8	(Hong Kong) Wang C	18	21	21
Q3	(South Korea) Lee Y-h	20	21	16
(South Korea) Hwang H-y	22	15	21
(Japan) E Hirose	21	21
3	(China) Zhu L	17	14

Second Round
(Indonesia) M K Yulianti	9	9
8	(Hong Kong) Wang C	21	21
(South Korea) Hwang H-y	14	23	13
(Japan) E Hirose	21	21	21

Quarter-finals
8	(Hong Kong) Wang C	17	21	14
(Japan) E Hirose	21	12	21

==== Section 4 ====
First Round
(Singapore) Li L	15	23
(Netherlands) J Meulendijks	21	25
Q2	(Hong Kong) Zhou M	21	17	20
6	(France) Pi HY	19	21	22
(Scotland) S Hughes	16	14
(Japan) K Mori	21	21
(Bulgaria) P Nedelcheva	19	11
2	(China) Zhang N	21	21

Second Round
(Netherlands) J Meulendijks	23	12	11
6	(France) Pi HY	21	21	21
(Japan) K Mori	5	9
2	(China) Zhang N	21	21

Quarter-finals
6	(France) Pi HY	11	14
2	(China) Zhang N	21	21

== Men's doubles ==
=== Seeds ===
1. (China) Fu Haifeng / Cai Yun (champions)
2. (Denmark) Jens Eriksen / Martin Lundgaard Hansen (second round)
3. (Indonesia) Markis Kido / Hendra Setiawan (semi-finals)
4. (Indonesia) Candra Wijaya / (United States) Tony Gunawan (semi-finals)
5. (Malaysia) Koo Kien Keat / Tan Boon Heong (first round)
6. (Malaysia) Choong Tan Fook / Lee Wan Wah (final)
7. (England) Anthony Clark / Robert Blair (second round)
8. (South Korea) Jung Jae-sung / Lee Jae-jin (quarter-finals)

=== Finals ===
Semi-finals
1	(China) Fu Haifeng (China) Cai Yun	18	23	21
4	(Indonesia) Candra Wijaya (United States) Tony Gunawan	21	21	11
3	(Indonesia) Markis Kido (Indonesia) Hendra Setiawan	18	13
6	(Malaysia) Choong Tan Fook (Malaysia) Lee Wan Wah	21	21

Final
1	(China) Fu Haifeng (China) Cai Yun	16	24	21
6	(Malaysia) Choong Tan Fook (Malaysia) Lee Wan Wah	21	22	18

=== Top half ===
==== Section 1 ====
First Round
1	(China) Fu HF (China) Cai Y	21	21
(Russia) V Durkin (Russia) A Nikolaenko	13	9
(Denmark) L Paaske (Denmark) J Rasmussen	21	17	18
(Malaysia) Tan B S (Malaysia) Ong S H	18	21	21
8	(South Korea) Jung J-s (South Korea) Lee J-j	22	21
(Indonesia) L Hadiyanto (Indonesia) A Yulianto	20	16
(France) S Stoyanov (France) M Popov	21	21
(Germany) R Spitko (Germany) M Fuchs	11	10

Second Round
1	(China) Fu HF (China) Cai Y	21	16	21
(Malaysia) Tan B S (Malaysia) Ong S H	16	21	15
8	(South Korea) Jung J-s (South Korea) Lee J-j	21	21
(France) S Stoyanov (France) M Popov	16	12

Quarter-finals
1	(China) Fu HF (China) Cai Y	21	23
8	(South Korea) Jung J-s (South Korea) Lee J-j	12	21

==== Section 2 ====
First Round
4	(Indonesia) C Wijaya (United States) T Gunawan	21	21
(Singapore) H Saputra (Singapore) H Wijaya	7	16
(Denmark) S Mollyhus (Denmark) A Kristiansen	12	21	14
Q3	(China) Guo ZD (China) Xie ZB	21	15	21
7	(England) A Clark (England) R Blair	21	21
(Malaysia) Gna T C (Malaysia) R Lin W F	13	15
Q2	(South Korea) Hwang J-m (South Korea) Han S-h	21	21
(Germany) K Hopp (Germany) I Kindervater	17	15

Second Round
4	(Indonesia) C Wijaya (United States) T Gunawan	21	21
Q3	(China) Guo ZD (China) Xie ZB	14	7
7	(England) A Clark (England) R Blair	16	13
Q2	(South Korea) Hwang J-m (South Korea) Han S-h	21	21

Quarter-finals
4	(Indonesia) C Wijaya (United States) T Gunawan	21	21
Q2	(South Korea) Hwang J-m (South Korea) Han S-h	14	18

=== Bottom half ===
==== Section 3 ====
First Round
Q1	(China) Shen Y (China) He HB	18	12
(Indonesia) R Sukmawan (Indonesia) E Hian	21	21
(Malaysia) M Z Abdul Latif (Malaysia) M F Mohd Tazari	15	21	21
5	(Malaysia) Koo K K (Malaysia) Tan B H	21	13	15
(Malaysia) Khoo C C (Malaysia) M R Abdul Latif	16	21	12
(Poland) M Łogosz (Poland) R Mateusiak	21	14	21
(Australia) A Brehaut (Australia) A B Sindoro	11	18
3	(Indonesia) M Kido (Indonesia) H Setiawan	21	21

Second Round
(Indonesia) R Sukmawan (Indonesia) E Hian	9	13
(Malaysia) M Z Abdul Latif (Malaysia) M F Mohd Tazari	21	21
(Poland) M Łogosz (Poland) R Mateusiak	16	10
3	(Indonesia) M Kido (Indonesia) H Setiawan	21	21

Quarter-finals
(Malaysia) M Z Abdul Latif (Malaysia) M F Mohd Tazari	19	14
3	(Indonesia) M Kido (Indonesia) H Setiawan	21	21

==== Section 4 ====
First Round
(Japan) S Sakamoto (Japan) S Ikeda	19	9
(Japan) T Ōtsuka (Japan) K Masuda	21	21
(Malaysia) Chan C M (Malaysia) Hoon T H	16	17
6	(Malaysia) Choong T F (Malaysia) Lee W W	21	21
(Indonesia) H A Gunawan (Indonesia) J Riyadi	15	21	21
(Wales) M Hughes (Wales) M Lewis	21	7	12
(Hong Kong) A S Njoto (Hong Kong) Y H Wiratama	16	27	15
2	(Denmark) J Eriksen (Denmark) M Lundgaard Hansen	21	25	21

Second Round
(Japan) T Ōtsuka (Japan) K Masuda	17	16
6	(Malaysia) Choong T F (Malaysia) Lee W W	21	21
(Indonesia) H A Gunawan (Indonesia) J Riyadi	21	21
2	(Denmark) J Eriksen (Denmark) M Lundgaard Hansen	15	17

Quarter-finals
6	(Malaysia) Choong T F (Malaysia) Lee W W	21	21
(Indonesia) H A Gunawan (Indonesia) J Riyadi	19	12

== Women's doubles ==
=== Seeds ===
1. (China) Zhang Yawen / Wei Yili (champions)
2. (Chinese Taipei) Chien Yu-chin / Cheng Wen-hsing (quarter-finals)
3. (South Korea) Lee Kyung-won / Lee Hyo-jung (semi-finals)
4. (Malaysia) Wong Pei Tty / Chin Eei Hui (second round)
5. (China) Gao Ling / Zhang Jiewen (semi-finals)
6. (China) Zhao Tingting / Yang Wei (final)
7. (Indonesia) Greysia Polii / Vita Marissa (quarter-finals)
8. (Singapore) Jiang Yanmei / Li Yujia (quarter-finals)

=== Finals ===
Semi-finals
1	(China) Zhang Yawen (China) Wei Yili	21	21
3	(South Korea) Lee Kyung-won (South Korea) Lee Hyo-jung	12	12
6	(China) Zhao Tingting (China) Yang Wei	w	/	o
5	(China) Gao Ling (China) Zhang Jiewen

Final
1	(China) Zhang Yawen (China) Wei Yili	10	21	21
6	(China) Zhao Tingting (China) Yang Wei	21	19	18

=== Top half ===
==== Section 1 ====
First Round
1	(China) Zhang YW (China) Wei YL	21	21
(Russia) N Vislova (Russia) V Sorokina	12	9
(England) G Emms (England) D Kellogg	12	21	21
(Poland) K Augustyn (Poland) N Kostiuczyk	21	8	15
7	(Indonesia) G Polii (Indonesia) V Marissa	21	21
(Russia) A Russkikh (Russia) E Ananina	18	19
(Bulgaria) P Nedelcheva (Bulgaria) D Dimova	8	10
(Japan) K Ogura (Japan) R Shiota	21	21

Second Round
1	(China) Zhang YW (China) Wei YL	21	21
(England) G Emms (England) D Kellogg	12	9
7	(Indonesia) G Polii (Indonesia) V Marissa	21	21
(Japan) K Ogura (Japan) R Shiota	18	14

Quarter-finals
1	(China) Zhang YW (China) Wei YL	21	27
7	(Indonesia) G Polii (Indonesia) V Marissa	7	25

==== Section 2 ====
First Round
3	(South Korea) Lee K-w (South Korea) Lee H-j	21	21
(Japan) A Akao (Japan) T Matsuda	17	15
Q3	(Chinese Taipei) Chou C-c (Chinese Taipei) Ku P-t	21	21
(Sweden) J Persson (Sweden) E Bergblom	18	18
8	(Singapore) Jiang YM (Singapore) Li YJ	21	21
Q1	(Singapore) V Neo (Singapore) S M Sari	10	10
(Indonesia) E Nursugianti (Indonesia) R Mundiasti	22	15	21
(Thailand) D Aroonkesorn (Thailand) K Voravichitchaikul	20	21	10

Second Round
3	(South Korea) Lee K-w (South Korea) Lee H-j	21	21
Q3	(Chinese Taipei) Chou C-c (Chinese Taipei) Ku P-t	7	19
8	(Singapore) Jiang YM (Singapore) Li YJ	21	13	21
(Indonesia) E Nursugianti (Indonesia) R Mundiasti	13	21	18

Quarter-finals
3	(South Korea) Lee K-w (South Korea) Lee H-j	21	21
8	(Singapore) Jiang YM (Singapore) Li YJ	11	11

=== Bottom half ===
==== Section 3 ====
First Round
Q2	(Malaysia) Mooi H Y (Malaysia) Ooi Y H	10	14
(Japan) M Maeda (Japan) S Suetsuna	21	21
(Scotland) I Bankier (Scotland) E Mason	10	16
6	(China) Zhao TT (China) Yang W	21	21
(China) Du J (China) Yu Y	21	21
(England) J Nicholas (England) N Munt	9	8
(Germany) N Grether (Germany) J Schenk	11	13
4	(Malaysia) Wong P T (Malaysia) Chin E H	21	21

Second Round
(Japan) M Maeda (Japan) S Suetsuna	14	14
6	(China) Zhao TT (China) Yang W	21	21
(China) Du J (China) Yu Y	24	21
4	(Malaysia) Wong P T (Malaysia) Chin E H	22	9

Quarter-finals
6	(China) Zhao TT (China) Yang W	21	21
(China) Du J (China) Yu Y	18	12

==== Section 4 ====
First Round
(France) É Eymard (France) W Rahmawati	18	12
PFQ	(Germany) C Mette (Germany) B Overzier	21	21
PFQ	(Sweden) E Lennartsson (Sweden) S Hansson	8	9
5	(China) Gao L (China) Zhang JW	21	21
PFQ	(Canada) F McKee (Canada) C Reid	15	5
Q4	(South Korea) Ha J-e (South Korea) Kim M-j	21	21
(Malaysia) Lim P S (Malaysia) J Quay	21	20	15
2	(Chinese Taipei) Chien Y-c (Chinese Taipei) Chen W-h	13	22	21

Second Round
PFQ	(Germany) C Mette (Germany) B Overzier	8	13
5	(China) Gao L (China) Zhang JW	21	21
Q4	(South Korea) Ha J-e (South Korea) Kim M-j	11	12
2	(Chinese Taipei) Chien Y-c (Chinese Taipei) Chen W-h	21	21

Quarter-finals
5	(China) Gao L (China) Zhang JW	21	21
2	(Chinese Taipei) Chien Y-c (Chinese Taipei) Chen W-h	15	14

== Mixed doubles ==
=== Seeds ===
1. (Indonesia) Nova Widianto / Liliyana Natsir (semi-finals)
2. (China) Xie Zhongbo / Zhang Yawen (semi-finals)
3. (Thailand) Sudket Prapakamol / Saralee Thungthongkam (final)
4. (Denmark) Thomas Laybourn / Kamilla Rytter Juhl (withdrew)
5. (China) Zheng Bo / Gao Ling (quarter-finals)
6. (England) Anthony Clark / Donna Kellogg (first round)
7. (England) Nathan Robertson / Gail Emms (quarter-finals)
8. (Indonesia) Flandy Limpele / Vita Marissa (champions)

=== Finals ===
Semi-finals
1	(Indonesia) Nova Widianto (Indonesia) Liliyana Natsir	16	21	17
8	(Indonesia) Flandy Limpele (Indonesia) Vita Marissa	21	16	21
3	(Thailand) Sudket Prapakamol (Thailand) Saralee Thungthongkam	16	22	21
2	(China) Xie Zhongbo (China) Zhang Yawen	21	20	18

Final
8	(Indonesia) Flandy Limpele (Indonesia) Vita Marissa	21	21
3	(Thailand) Sudket Prapakamol (Thailand) Saralee Thungthongkam	14	13

=== Top half ===
==== Section 1 ====
First Round
1	(Indonesia) N Widianto (Indonesia) L Natsir	22	21
(Russia) V Durkin (Russia) V Sorokina	20	15
(Germany) K Hopp (Germany) B Overzier	14	13
(Denmark) L Paaske (Denmark) M Schjoldager	21	21
5	(China) Zheng B (China) Gao L	22	21
Q4	(Malaysia) Tan W K (Malaysia) Woon K W	20	18
(New Zealand) D Shirley (Malaysia) J Quay	18	18
(Indonesia) M Rijal (Indonesia) G Polii	21	21

Second Round
1	(Indonesia) N Widianto (Indonesia) L Natsir	21	21
(Denmark) L Paaske (Denmark) M Schjoldager	17	13
5	(China) Zheng B (China) Gao L	21	21
(Indonesia) M Rijal (Indonesia) G Polii	15	19

Quarter-finals
1	(Indonesia) N Widianto (Indonesia) L Natsir	21	21
5	(China) Zheng B (China) Gao L	9	15

==== Section 2 ====
First Round
PFQ	(Japan) K Masuda (Japan) M Maeda	18	19
(Poland) R Mateusiak (Poland) N Kostiuczyk	21	21
(France) S Stoyanov (France) É Eymard	18	11
(China) Zhang J (China) Zhao TT	21	21
8	(Indonesia) F Limpele (Indonesia) V Marissa	21	21
Q1	(Denmark) J Eriksen (Denmark) H Nielsen	19	18
(Singapore) H Wijaya (Singapore) Jiang YM	17	16
(England) R Blair (Scotland) I Bankier	21	21

Second Round
(Poland) R Mateusiak (Poland) N Kostiuczyk	21	14	10
(China) Zhang J (China) Zhao TT	14	21	21
8	(Indonesia) F Limpele (Indonesia) V Marissa	21	21
(England) R Blair (Scotland) I Bankier	11	18

Quarter-finals
(China) Zhang J (China) Zhao TT	15	15
8	(Indonesia) F Limpele (Indonesia) V Marissa	21	21

=== Bottom half ===
==== Section 3 ====
First Round
Q2	(South Korea) Han S-h (South Korea) Hwang Y-m	21	21
(Denmark) J Rasmussen (Denmark) L Frier Kristiansen	16	11
(China) He HB (China) Yu Y	21	22
6	(England) A Clark (England) D Kellogg	19	20
PFQ	(Germany) T Dettmann (Germany) A Lillie	8	10
(South Korea) Lee J-j (South Korea) Lee H-j	21	21
(Russia) A Nikolaenko (Russia) N Vislova	21	14	20
3	(Thailand) S Prapakamol (Thailand) S Thungthongkam	13	21	22

Second Round
Q2	(South Korea) Han S-h (South Korea) Hwang Y-m	21	14	22
(China) He HB (China) Yu Y	18	21	20
(South Korea) Lee J-j (South Korea) Lee H-j	19	21	18
3	(Thailand) S Prapakamol (Thailand) S Thungthongkam	21	15	21

Quarter-finals
Q2	(South Korea) Han S-h (South Korea) Hwang Y-m	21	15	9
3	(Thailand) S Prapakamol (Thailand) S Thungthongkam	15	21	21

==== Section 4 ====
First Round
(Germany) I Kindervater (Germany) K Piotrowski	14	17
(Malaysia) M F Mohd Tazari (Malaysia) Wong P T	21	21
Q3	(Poland) M Łogosz (England) N Munt	16	18
7	(England) N Robertson (England) G Emms	21	21
(Philippines) Kennevic Asuncion (Philippines) Kennie Asuncion	21	22	14
(Thailand) S Anugritayawon (Thailand) K Voravichitchaikul	16	24	21
(Singapore) H Saputra (Singapore) Li YJ	19	16
2	(China) Xie ZB (China) Zhang YW	21	21

Second Round
(Malaysia) M F Mohd Tazari (Malaysia) Wong P T	21	14	9
7	(England) N Robertson (England) G Emms	16	21	21
(Thailand) S Anugritayawon (Thailand) K Voravichitchaikul	8	13
2	(China) Xie ZB (China) Zhang YW	21	21

Quarter-finals
7	(England) N Robertson (England) G Emms	17	21	12
2	(China) Xie ZB (China) Zhang YW	21	10	21
