= 2007 BWF Super Series =

Badminton championships

Tournament details
- Dates: 16 January – 2 December 2007
- Edition: 1st

The 2007 BWF Super Series was the inaugural season of the BWF Super Series. It was held from January 16 with Malaysia Open and end on December 2, 2007. It was expected to end on December 23, 2007 with Super Series Finals; this event was postponed and later cancelled due to an uncertain circumstance.

== Schedule ==
Tour	Official title	Venue	City	Date		Prize money USD	Report
Tour	Official title	Venue	City	Start	Finish	Prize money USD	Report
1	Malaysia Open Super Series	Stadium Badminton Kuala Lumpur	Kuala Lumpur	January 16	January 21	200,000	Report
2	(South Korea) Korea Open Super Series	2nd Olympic Gymnasium	Seoul	January 23	January 28	300,000	Report
3	All England Open Super Series	National Indoor Arena	Birmingham	March 6	March 11	200,000	Report
4	(Switzerland) Swiss Open Super Series	St. Jakobshalle	Basel	March 12	March 18	200,000	Report
5	Singapore Open Super Series	Singapore Indoor Stadium	Singapore	May 1	May 6	200,000	Report
6	Indonesia Super Series	Istora Senayan	Jakarta	May 7	May 13	250,000	Report
7	China Masters Super Series	Sichuan Provincial Gymnasium	Chengdu	July 10	July 15	250,000	Report
8	Japan Open Super Series	Tokyo Metropolitan Gymnasium	Tokyo	September 11	September 16	200,000	Report
9	Denmark Super Series	Arena Fyn	Odense	October 23	October 28	200,000	Report
10	(France) French Super Series	Stade Pierre de Coubertin	Paris	October 30	November 4	200,000	Report
11	China Open Super Series	Tianhe Gymnasium	Guangzhou	November 20	November 25	250,000	Report
12	Hong Kong Super Series	Ma On Shan Sports Centre; Queen Elizabeth Stadium	Ma On Shan; Wan Chai	November 26	December 2	200,000	Report
13	Super Series Finals	Cancelled				500,000	~~Report~~

Venue and date for the Super Series Final still uncertain after Qatar failed to get enough sponsorship to support the event. It supposed to be held on January 2, to January 6, 2008, however once again it was delayed by Badminton World Federation to an uncertain date. The tournament was eventually canceled.

== Results ==
=== Winners ===
Tour	Men's singles	Women's singles	Men's doubles	Women's doubles	Mixed doubles
Malaysia	(Denmark) Peter Gade	(China) Zhu Lin	(Malaysia) Koo Kien Keat (Malaysia) Tan Boon Heong	(China) Gao Ling (China) Huang Sui	(China) Zheng Bo (China) Gao Ling
(South Korea) Korea	(China) Lin Dan	(China) Xie Xingfang	(South Korea) Jung Jae-sung (South Korea) Lee Yong-dae	(China) Gao Ling (China) Huang Sui	(China) Zheng Bo (China) Gao Ling
England	(China) Lin Dan	(China) Xie Xingfang	(Malaysia) Koo Kien Keat (Malaysia) Tan Boon Heong	(China) Wei Yili (China) Zhang Yawen	(China) Zheng Bo (China) Gao Ling
(Switzerland) Swiss	(China) Chen Jin	(China) Zhang Ning	(Malaysia) Koo Kien Keat (Malaysia) Tan Boon Heong	(China) Yang Wei (China) Zhao Tingting	(South Korea) Lee Yong-dae (South Korea) Lee Hyo-jung
Singapore	(Thailand) Boonsak Ponsana	(China) Zhang Ning	(China) Cai Yun (China) Fu Haifeng	(China) Wei Yili (China) Zhang Yawen	(Indonesia) Flandy Limpele (Indonesia) Vita Marissa
Indonesia	(Malaysia) Lee Chong Wei	(Hong Kong) Wang Chen	(China) Cai Yun (China) Fu Haifeng	(China) Du Jing (China) Yu Yang	(China) Zheng Bo (China) Gao Ling
China Masters	(China) Lin Dan	(China) Xie Xingfang	(China) Cai Yun (China) Fu Haifeng	(Indonesia) Vita Marissa (Indonesia) Liliyana Natsir	(China) Zheng Bo (China) Gao Ling
Japan	(Malaysia) Lee Chong Wei	(Denmark) Tine Rasmussen	(United States) Tony Gunawan (Indonesia) Candra Wijaya	(China) Yang Wei (China) Zhang Jiewen	(China) Zheng Bo (China) Gao Ling
Denmark	(China) Lin Dan	(China) Lu Lan	(Malaysia) Koo Kien Keat (Malaysia) Tan Boon Heong	(China) Yang Wei (China) Zhang Jiewen	(China) He Hanbin (China) Yu Yang
(France) French	(Malaysia) Lee Chong Wei	(China) Xie Xingfang	(China) Cai Yun (China) Fu Haifeng	(China) Wei Yili (China) Zhang Yawen	(Indonesia) Flandy Limpele (Indonesia) Vita Marissa
China Open	(China) Bao Chunlai	(Malaysia) Wong Mew Choo	(Indonesia) Markis Kido (Indonesia) Hendra Setiawan	(China) Gao Ling (China) Zhao Tingting	(Indonesia) Nova Widianto (Indonesia) Liliyana Natsir
Hong Kong	(China) Lin Dan	(China) Xie Xingfang	(Indonesia) Markis Kido (Indonesia) Hendra Setiawan	(China) Du Jing (China) Yu Yang	(Indonesia) Nova Widianto (Indonesia) Liliyana Natsir

=== Performances by countries ===
Tabulated below are the Super Series performances based on countries. Only countries who have won a title are listed:

Rank	Team	MAS	KOR	ENG	SUI	SIN	INA	CHN	JPN	DEN	FRA	CHN	HKG	Total
1	China	3	4	4	3	3	3	4	2	4	3	2	3	38
2	Malaysia	1		1	1		1		1	1	1	1		8
3	Indonesia					1		1	0.5		1	2	2	7.5
4	South Korea		1		1									2
4	Denmark	1							1					2
6	Thailand					1								1
6	Hong Kong						1							1
8	United States								0.5					0.5

== Super Series Rankings ==
After Hong Kong Open Super Series

=== Leader progress ===
Tabulated below are the leader progress in Super Series ranking towards the Super Series Final in December:

Category	Players	MAS	KOR	ENG	SUI	SIN	INA	CHN	JPN	DEN	FRA	CHN	HKG
Men's singles	(Denmark) Peter Gade	✓											
Men's singles	(China) Bao Chunlai		✓										
Men's singles	(China) Lin Dan			✓		✓		✓	✓	✓	✓	✓	✓
Men's singles	(China) Chen Jin				✓		✓						
Women's singles	(China) Zhu Lin	✓	✓	✓	✓		✓						
Women's singles	(Germany) Xu Huaiwen					✓							
Women's singles	(China) Xie Xingfang							✓	✓	✓	✓	✓	✓
Men's doubles	(Malaysia) Koo Kien Keat (Malaysia) Tan Boon Heong	✓		✓	✓	✓	✓						
Men's doubles	(South Korea) Jung Jae-sung (South Korea) Lee Yong-dae		✓										
Men's doubles	(China) Fu Haifeng (China) Cai Yun							✓	✓	✓	✓	✓	✓
Women's doubles	(China) Gao Ling (China) Huang Sui	✓	✓	✓	✓								
Women's doubles	(China) Zhang Yawen (China) Wei Yili					✓	✓	✓	✓	✓	✓	✓	✓
Mixed doubles	(China) Zheng Bo (China) Gao Ling	✓	✓	✓	✓	✓	✓	✓	✓	✓	✓	✓	✓

=== Men's singles ===
Legend
1	Winner(s)
2	Runners-up
SF	Semi-finalists
QF	Quarter-finalists
R2	Last 16
R1	Last 32
Q	Qualification
DNP	Did not play

Rank	Player	MAS	KOR	ENG	SUI	SIN	INA	CHN	JPN	DEN	FRA	CHN	HKG	Points
1	(China) Lin Dan	R2	1	1	SF	QF	DNP	1	SF	1	SF	R1	1	73,900
2	(Malaysia) Lee Chong Wei	QF	QF	QF	R1	R1	1	SF	1	SF	1	2	2	71,160
3	(China) Bao Chunlai	2	SF	SF	R2	DNP	2	QF	R1	2	2	1	R2	65,480
4	(China) Chen Jin	QF	2	SF	1	R2	R1	R1	QF	QF	SF	SF	SF	61,400
5	(Denmark) Peter Gade	1	DNP	R1	SF	SF	QF	R2	QF	R2	QF	QF	QF	54,440
6	(Denmark) Kenneth Jonassen	SF	R1	QF	QF	QF	R2	QF	R2	SF	R1	QF	SF	51,660
7	(Indonesia) Sony Dwi Kuncoro	R2	QF	QF	QF	R2	QF	R2	R1	QF	R1	QF	QF	46,080
8	(Indonesia) Simon Santoso	DNP	DNP	R2	2	R2	R2	R2	SF	QF	R2	R1	R1	41,700
9	(Thailand) Boonsak Ponsana	R1	R1	R2	R1	1	R2	QF	R2	R1	QF	R1	DNP	38,960
10	(China) Chen Yu	QF	QF	2	QF	2	DNP	R1	R2	DNP	DNP	R1	DNP	38,760

=== Women's singles ===
Rank	Player	MAS	KOR	ENG	SUI	SIN	INA	CHN	JPN	DEN	FRA	CHN	HKG	Points
1	(China) Xie Xingfang	DNP	1	1	DNP	2	R2	1	2	QF	1	2	1	78,040
2	(China) Zhang Ning	DNP	DNP	SF	1	1	QF	2	QF	2	SF	SF	R2	66,940
3	(China) Lu Lan	R2	SF	R1	2	R1	R2	QF	SF	1	QF	SF	SF	59,960
4	(China) Zhu Lin	1	2	SF	R1	R1	2	R1	R1	SF	R1	QF	2	57,140
5	(France) Pi Hongyan	R1	R1	2	QF	QF	SF	SF	QF	QF	2	R2	R2	55,800
6	(Germany) Xu Huaiwen	QF	QF	QF	SF	SF	QF	QF	R1	QF	QF	DNP	DNP	50,340
7	(Hong Kong) Wang Chen	DNP	R2	QF	R2	QF	1	R2	QF	SF	R1	R2	DNP	47,360
8	(Malaysia) Wong Mew Choo	2	R2	QF	R1	R2	R1	R1	R2	R1	SF	1	R1	45,920
9	(Denmark) Tine Rasmussen	R2	R2	R1	DNP	QF	R2	R1	1	R2	R2	R2	QF	43,100
10	(Hong Kong) Yip Pui Yin	QF	R1	R1	R2	R2	R2	SF	QF	R2	QF	DNP	R2	41,760

=== Men's doubles ===
Rank	Players	MAS	KOR	ENG	SUI	SIN	INA	CHN	JPN	DEN	FRA	CHN	HKG	Points
1	(China) Fu Haifeng (China) Cai Yun	R2	QF	2	QF	1	1	1	R2	SF	1	R1	SF	71,120
2	(Indonesia) Markis Kido (Indonesia) Hendra Setiawan	SF	QF	R2	DNP	SF	QF	2	SF	SF	QF	1	1	67,000
3	(Malaysia) Koo Kien Keat (Malaysia) Tan Boon Heong	1	SF	1	1	R1	SF	DNP	R2	1	QF	R2	QF	66,920
4	(Indonesia) Candra Wijaya (United States) Tony Gunawan	2	SF	SF	SF	SF	SF	DNP	1	DNP	DNP	R1	2	59,120
5	(Denmark) Jens Eriksen (Denmark) Martin Lundgaard Hansen	QF	QF	SF	2	R2	R2	DNP	R2	2	R1	QF	R2	51,540
6	(Malaysia) Choong Tan Fook (Malaysia) Lee Wan Wah	R1	QF	QF	R1	2	QF	R2	R2	R1	2	SF	R1	48,780
7	(South Korea) Jung Jae-sung (South Korea) Lee Yong-dae	SF	1	QF	R2	DNP	DNP	DNP	R2	QF	SF	QF	R1	46,580
8	(Indonesia) Luluk Hadiyanto (Indonesia) Alvent Yulianto	R2	DNP	R2	DNP	R1	R2	SF	2	R2	QF	R1	SF	44,520
9	(Indonesia) Hendra Gunawan (Indonesia) Joko Riyadi	R1	R2	R1	QF	QF	R2	QF	R1	R2	R2	R2	R1	37,560
10	(Japan) Tadashi Ohtsuka (Japan) Keita Masuda	R1	R1	R1	R1	R2	R1	R2	QF	R1	SF	R2	QF	36,180

=== Women's doubles ===
Rank	Players	MAS	KOR	ENG	SUI	SIN	INA	CHN	JPN	DEN	FRA	CHN	HKG	Points
1	(China) Zhang Yawen (China) Wei Yili	DNP	SF	1	R2	1	QF	QF	SF	R1	1	SF	2	68,340
2	(China) Yang Wei (China) Zhang Jiewen	QF	2	2	DNP	DNP	DNP	DNP	1	1	QF	QF	QF	54,160
3	(South Korea) Lee Kyung-won (South Korea) Lee Hyo-jung	DNP	SF	R1	2	SF	QF	DNP	QF	2	R2	DNP	QF	49,380
4	(England) Gail Emms (England) Donna Kellogg	R1	R1	R2	R2	R2	SF	SF	R2	SF	R2	R2	QF	45,900
5	(Japan) Kumiko Ogura (Japan) Reiko Shiota	SF	R2	DNP	DNP	R2	R2	QF	R2	QF	QF	QF	R2	44,580
6	(China) Du Jing (China) Yu Yang	DNP	DNP	QF	DNP	QF	1	SF	2	SF	2	2	1	42,700
7	(Chinese Taipei) Chien Yu Chin (Chinese Taipei) Cheng Wen-Hsing	DNP	DNP	QF	SF	QF	R1	R2	QF	DNP	SF	R1	SF	42,420
8	(China) Gao Ling (China) Huang Sui	1	1	SF	DNP	DNP	DNP	QF	SF	DNP	DNP	DNP	DNP	36,280
9	(Japan) Aki Akao (Japan) Tomomi Matsuda	R1	QF	R1	QF	R1	R1	DNP	QF	R2	QF	R2	R1	36,240
10	(Malaysia) Wong Pei Tty (Malaysia) Chin Eei Hui	R1	R1	SF	DNP	R2	QF	R2	R1	QF	R1	R2	R2	36,180

=== Mixed doubles ===
Rank	Players	MAS	KOR	ENG	SUI	SIN	INA	CHN	JPN	DEN	FRA	CHN	HKG	Points
1	(China) Zheng Bo (China) Gao Ling	1	1	1	DNP	QF	1	1	1	DNP	SF	QF	2	79,500
2	(Indonesia) Nova Widianto (Indonesia) Liliyana Natsir	SF	R2	QF	DNP	SF	2	SF	2	R1	QF	1	1	66,940
3	(China) Xie Zhongbo (China) Zhang Yawen	DNP	SF	SF	QF	SF	QF	QF	R2	SF	2	SF	SF	61,440
4	(England) Nathan Robertson (England) Gail Emms	2	SF	QF	DNP	QF	R2	SF	R2	2	QF	SF	R2	57,180
5	(Indonesia) Flandy Limpele (Indonesia) Vita Marissa	QF	R1	R1	DNP	1	R1	R2	QF	QF	1	QF	SF	55,780
6	(Thailand) Sudket Prapakamol (Thailand) Saralee Thungthongkam	R2	QF	DNP	DNP	2	R2	QF	QF	SF	R1	2	QF	51,600
7	(Denmark) Thomas Laybourn (Denmark) Kamilla Rytter Juhl	QF	2	R2	DNP	DNP	DNP	QF	SF	QF	SF	R1	QF	46,620
8	(England) Anthony Clark (England) Donna Kellogg	R2	R2	2	R1	R1	QF	2	QF	QF	R1	R1	R1	44,580
8	(China) He Hanbin (China) Yu Yang	DNP	DNP	SF	DNP	R2	SF	QF	R2	1	R2	QF	DNP	42,920
10	(Poland) Robert Mateusiak (Poland) Nadieżda Kostiuczyk	QF	R1	R1	SF	R2	R1	R2	DNP	R2	QF	R1	R1	36,180
