= Wong Mew Choo =

Malaysian badminton player (born 1983)

Datin Seri Wong Mew Choo 黄妙珠
Personal information
- Born: 1 May 1983 (age 43) Ipoh, Perak, Malaysia
- Years active: 2003–2011
- Height: 1.64 m (5 ft 5 in)
- Weight: 51 kg (112 lb; 8.0 st)
- Spouse: Dato Seri Lee Chong Wei (m. 2012)

Sport
- Country: Malaysia
- Sport: Badminton
- Handedness: Right
- Coached by: Misbun Sidek
- Retired: 2011

Women's singles
- Highest ranking: 7 (30 October 2008)
- BWF profile
Medal record
Women's badminton
Representing Malaysia
Sudirman Cup
Bronze medal – third place	2009 Guangzhou	Mixed team
Commonwealth Games
Gold medal – first place	2006 Melbourne	Mixed team
Gold medal – first place	2010 Delhi	Mixed team
Silver medal – second place	2006 Melbourne	Women's singles
Silver medal – second place	2010 Delhi	Women's singles
Asian Championships
Bronze medal – third place	2007 Johor Bahru	Women's singles
SEA Games
Gold medal – first place	2003 Vietnam	Women's singles
Gold medal – first place	2009 Vientiane	Women's team
Silver medal – second place	2005 Manila	Women's singles
Bronze medal – third place	2005 Manila	Women's team
Bronze medal – third place	2009 Vientiane	Women's singles

Wong Mew Choo
- Traditional Chinese: 黃妙珠
- Simplified Chinese: 黄妙珠
Transcriptions
Standard Mandarin
- Hanyu Pinyin: Huáng Miàozhū

Datin Seri Wong Mew Choo (born 1 May 1983) is a Malaysian former badminton singles player.

== Career ==
She first came to prominence in the 2003 SEA Games badminton women's singles, where she won the gold medal, along the way beating Singapore's Li Li, the then reigning Commonwealth Games Champion.

=== 2005 ===
She competed at the 2005 World Championships in Anaheim and reached the second round. She managed two quarterfinal appearances, in the Denmark Open and 2005 Asian Championships.

She managed to reach the semifinal of Indonesia Open, losing a tough encounter with Mia Audina. Later that year, she qualified again for the 2005 SEA Games women's singles badminton final, but had to settle for silver, losing to Adriyanti Firdasari from Indonesia.

=== 2006 ===
In the 2006 Commonwealth Games in Melbourne, she helped Malaysia clinch the gold medal in the mixed team event, taking the crucial point against England's Tracey Hallam that gave Malaysia the lead 2–1. Eventually the team won 3–1 over against England for the first time in the games history. However, Hallam exacted revenge in the women's singles final.

In the World Championships, she reached the third round before losing to Zhang Ning.

Her best achievement of the year was in the Korea Open semifinals, losing to eventual winner Zhu Lin. She also reached the China Open quarterfinals.

=== 2007 ===
The year 2007 was Wong's best year. She started by reaching the finals of the Malaysia Superseries, defeating big names like Pi Hongyan and Xu Huaiwen on her way. At the All England Superseries, she beat Chinese Lu Lan to become the first Malaysian women's singles player to qualify to the women's singles quarterfinal. Lu claimed revenge in the 2007 Asian Championships.

Her biggest win was at the 2007 BWF World Championships third round, where she shocked China's Xie Xingfang in straight sets to become the first Malaysian women's singles player to reach the quarter-finals of the World Championships in Kuala Lumpur. However, her progress was stopped by Zhu Lin, who went on to take the title.

She was beaten in the first round of the Denmark Superseries, but quickly rebounded a week later, at the French Superseries. Wong defeated higher ranked players like Wang Chen. However, Wong lost to Xie Xingfang in the semifinal.

Wong, who was unseeded at the China Open Superseries and had not won any major championship since the 2003 SEA Games, delivered a brilliant performance in Guangzhou, China by beating all the top three female shuttlers from China in succession, starting with world champion Zhu Lin, two-time Olympic Champion Zhang Ning, and finally world number one Xie Xingfang in three sets in the final. She became the one of only a few non-Chinese (overseas Chinese) winners of the China Open. She also became the first Malaysian woman to lift an international title outside the country.

=== 2008 ===
Wong started the year by reaching the semifinal of Malaysia Superseries before losing to Zhu Lin once again.

She played in the Beijing 2008 Olympic Games, becoming the quarter-finalist after her defeat from Lu Lan of China.

=== 2009 ===
After getting injured at the beginning of this season, Wong returned in Swiss Open Superseries and India Open. But her achievements were not yet satisfactory.

She was also chosen as the Malaysia's top women's singles player to play in Sudirman Cup. In the semi-finals, Malaysia lost 0–3 to China.

In the China Open Superseries in November, Wong beat China's Wang Yihan, the world number one, in two sets, 21–18 and 21–17. However, she was beaten by Wang's compatriot Wang Shixian in the quarter-finals.

In December, Wong clinched her first title of the year in World Superseries Masters Finals - downing Juliane Schenk, 21–15, 21–7. Many top players did not play in women's singles of Superseries Finals, allowing Wong, who was ranked 20th in Superseries rankings at that time, to participate.

Wong led Malaysia women's team in 2009 SEA Games in Laos. She and her teammates won the gold medal by beating Indonesia 3–1. However, Wong failed to reach individual final as she was defeated by Thailand's Salakjit Ponsana 18–21, 14–21. As a result, Wong only claimed bronze.

In 2010 Commonwealth Games, Delhi, she won silver in a closely contested final with Saina Nehwal of India, ranked No 3 in the world.

=== 2011 ===
In April, Wong retired from competition, citing injuries that had taken a toll on her body. Due to her experience and service to the national team, BJSS offered her a coaching contract to become one of the women coaches.

== Achievements ==
=== Commonwealth Games ===
Women's singles
Year	Venue	Opponent	Score	Result
2006	Melbourne Convention and Exhibition Centre, Melbourne, Australia	(England) Tracey Hallam	12–21, 15–21	Silver
2010	Siri Fort Sports Complex, New Delhi, India	(India) Saina Nehwal	21–19, 21–23, 13–21	Silver

=== Asian Championships ===
Women's singles
Year	Venue	Opponent	Score	Result
2007	Stadium Bandaraya, Johor Bahru, Malaysia	(China) Lu Lan	17–21, 18–21	Bronze

=== SEA Games ===
Women's singles
Year	Venue	Opponent	Score	Result
2003	Tan Binh Sport Center, Ho Chi Minh City, Vietnam	(Thailand) Salakjit Ponsana	11–5, 11–5	Gold
2005	PhilSports Arena, Metro Manila, Philippines	(Indonesia) Adriyanti Firdasari	8–11, 7–11	Silver
2009	Gym Hall 1, National Sports Complex, Vientiane, Laos	(Thailand) Salakjit Ponsana	18–21, 14–21	Bronze

=== BWF Superseries ===
The BWF Superseries, launched on 14 December 2006 and implemented in 2007, is a series of elite badminton tournaments, sanctioned by Badminton World Federation (BWF). BWF Superseries has two level such as Superseries and Superseries Premier. A season of Superseries features twelve tournaments around the world, which introduced since 2011, with successful players invited to the Superseries Finals held at the year end.

Women's singles
Year	Tournament	Opponent	Score	Result
2007	Malaysia Open	(China) Zhu Lin	15–21, 12–21	(silver) Runner-up
2007	China Open	(China) Xie Xingfang	21–16, 8–21, 21–17	(gold) Winner
2009	World Superseries Masters Finals	(Germany) Juliane Schenk	21–15, 21–7	(gold) Winner

BWF Super Series Finals tournament
BWF Super Series tournament

=== BWF Grand Prix ===
The BWF Grand Prix has two levels: Grand Prix and Grand Prix Gold. It is a series of badminton tournaments, sanctioned by Badminton World Federation (BWF) since 2007. The World Badminton Grand Prix sanctioned by International Badminton Federation (IBF) since 1983.

Women's singles
Year	Tournament	Opponent	Score	Result
2010	India Open	(India) Saina Nehwal	22–20, 14–21, 12–21	(silver) Runner-up

== Career Overview ==
Year	Tournament	Achievement
2011	All England Super Series	First round
2011	German Grand Prix Gold	Semi-finalist
2011	Victor Korea Super Series Premier	Second round
2011	Proton Malaysia Super Series	First round
2010	2010 Commonwealth Games	Runner-Up
2010	2010 Commonwealth Games – Mixed team	Winner
2009	BWF Super Series Masters Finals	Winner
2009	Malaysia Grand Prix Gold	Semi-finalist
2009	Djarum Indonesia Super Series	First round
2009	Aviva Singapore Super Series	First round
2008
2008	Aviva Singapore Super Series	Semi-finalist
2008	Swiss Open Super Series	Second round
2008	All England Super Series	Quarter-finalist
2008	Korea Super Series	First round
2008	Proton Malaysia Super Series	Semi-finalist
2007
2007	Hong Kong Super Series	First round
2007	China Open Super Series	Winner
2007	French Super Series	Semi-finalist
2007	Denmark Super Series	First round
2007	Chinese Taipei Grand Prix Gold	Quarter-finalist
2007	Japan Super Series	Second round
2007	BWF World Championships	Quarter-finalist
2007	China Masters Super Series	First round
2007	Djarum Indonesia Super Series	First round
2007	Singapore Super Series	Second round
2007	2007 Asian Badminton Championships	Semi-finalist
2007	Swiss Super Series	First round
2007	Yonex All England Super Series	Quarter-finalist
2007	Proton Malaysia Super Series	Runner-Up
2006
2006	China Open	Quarter-finalist
2006	Japan Open	First round
2006	IBF World Championships	Second round
2006	Hong Kong Open	Second round
2006	Korea Open	Second round
2006	Thailand Open	Second round
2006	Djarum Indonesia Open	First round
2006	2006 Asian Badminton Championships	First round
2006	XVIII Commonwealth Games	Runner-Up
2006	Yonex All England Open	Second round
2006	Swiss Open	Second round
2005
2005	Denmark Open	Quarter-finalist
2005	Indonesia Open	Semi-finalist
2005	2005 Asian Badminton Championships	Quarter-finalist
2005	XXIII SEA Games	Runner-Up
2004
2004	2004 Asian Badminton Championships	Quarter-finalist
2004	Japan Open	First round
2004	Korea Open	Second round
2004	Yonex All England Open	Second round
2004	Swiss Open	First round
2004	Syed Modi Memorials	Runner-Up
2004	Thailand Open	Second round
2003	XXII SEA Games	Winner

== Record against selected opponents ==
Record against year-end Finals finalists, World Championships semi-finalists, and Olympic quarter-finalists.

Players	Matches	Results		Difference
Players	Matches	Won	Lost	Difference
(Australia) / (Chinese Taipei) Huang Chia-chi	2	1	1	0
(Bulgaria) Petya Nedelcheva	1	1	0	+1
(China) Dai Yun	1	0	1	–1
(China) Gong Ruina	1	0	1	–1
(China) Lu Lan	6	3	3	0
(China) Wang Lin	7	2	5	–3
(China) Wang Shixian	1	0	1	–1
(China) Wang Xin	5	0	5	–5
(China) Wang Yihan	1	1	0	+1
(China) Xie Xingfang	8	2	6	–4
(China) Zhang Ning	8	1	7	–6
(China) Zhu Lin	6	1	5	–4
(Chinese Taipei) Cheng Shao-chieh	4	2	2	0
(Denmark) Tine Baun	6	1	5	–4
(England) Tracey Hallam	1	1	0	+1

Players	Matches	Results		Difference
Players	Matches	Won	Lost	Difference
(France) Pi Hongyan	5	2	3	–1
(Germany) Petra Overzier	1	1	0	+1
(Germany) Juliane Schenk	2	2	0	+2
(Germany) Xu Huaiwen	3	1	2	–1
(Hong Kong) Wang Chen	5	2	3	–1
(Hong Kong) Yip Pui Yin	1	1	0	+1
(Hong Kong) Zhou Mi	3	0	3	–3
(India) Saina Nehwal	8	3	5	–2
(Indonesia) Lindaweni Fanetri	2	2	0	+2
(Indonesia) Maria Kristin Yulianti	2	1	1	0
(Netherlands) Mia Audina	2	0	2	–2
(South Korea) Bae Yeon-ju	1	0	1	–1
(South Korea) Sung Ji-hyun	1	0	1	–1
(Thailand) Porntip Buranaprasertsuk	3	3	0	+3

== Personal life ==
She has an elder sister, Wong Miew Kheng who was a former Malaysian national badminton player.

Mew Choo dated the Malaysian badminton star Lee Chong Wei. They met in 2001 at a public badminton camp when they were both back-up shuttlers for the Malaysian crew. In year 2009, Lee and Wong announced they are no longer together during the 2009 World Championships in Hyderabad, India.

However, Lee Chong Wei announced his reconciliation with Mew Choo after winning a silver medal in 2012 London Olympics. The duo were planning to settle down after 11 years of courtship, after the London Olympics. They got married on 9 November 2012. The couple had their first child, Kingston on 12 April 2013 and their second child, Terrance on 9 July 2015. They had their third son, Anson Lee, on 28 November, 2022.
