= Yeoh Kay Bin =

Malaysian badminton coach and former player

Yeoh Kay Bin 杨佳傧
Personal information
- Born: 19 July 1980 (age 46) Perak, Malaysia
- Height: 1.80 m (5 ft 11 in)

Sport
- Country: Malaysia
- Sport: Badminton
- Handedness: Right

Men's singles
- Career title: 2
- BWF profile
Medal record
Men's badminton
Representing Malaysia
Asian Championships
Bronze medal – third place	2007 Johor Bahru	Men's doubles
Southeast Asian Games
Bronze medal – third place	2007 Nakhon Ratchasima	Men's team
World Junior Championships
Silver medal – second place	1998 Melbourne	Boys' singles
Asian Junior Championships
Bronze medal – third place	1997 Manila	Boys' team

Yeoh Kay Bin (born 19 July 1980) is a Malaysian badminton coach and former player. He served as a coach of the Olympic bronze medalist Lee Zii Jia from 2024 to 2025, a year marked by Lee's injuries and limited competitiveness.

== Career ==
Yeoh was the champion at the 2003 India Satellite and 2010 Romanian International. In 2007, he won a bronze medal in the Asian Championships, beaten by Chen Hong in the semifinals.

== Achievements ==
=== Asian Championships ===
Men's singles
Year	Venue	Opponent	Score	Result
2007	Stadium Bandaraya Johor Bahru; Johor Bahru, Malaysia	(China) Chen Hong	14–21, 21–17, 17–21	Bronze

=== Finals: 4 (2 titles, 2 runners-up) ===
Outcome	Year	Tournament	Opponent	Score
Runner-up	1998	World Junior Championships	(China) Zhang Yang	10–15, 14–17
Runner-up	1998	India Satellite	(Malaysia) Lee Tsuen Seng	15–12, 8–15, 6–15
Winner	2003	India Satellite	(Malaysia) Lee Chong Wei	15–5, 15–13
Winner	2010	Romanian International	(Republic of Ireland) Scott Evans	21–19, 21–11
