= Hwang Hye-youn =

South Korean badminton player (born 1985)

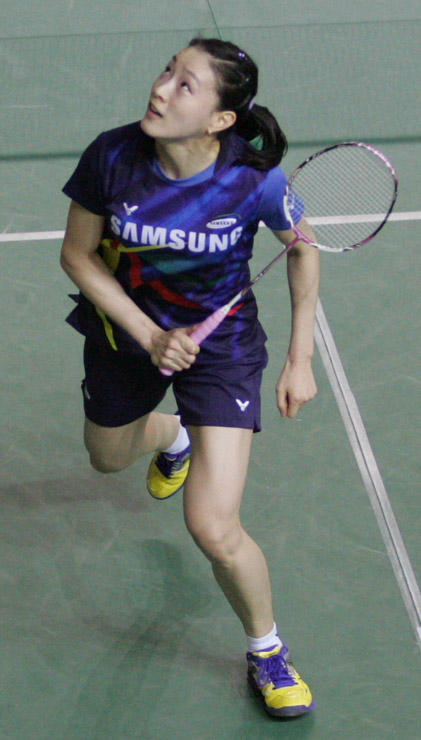

Personal information
- Born: April 3, 1985 (age 41) Pocheon, Gyeonggi Province, South Korea
- Height: 1.65 m (5 ft 5 in)

Sport
- Country: South Korea
- Sport: Badminton
- Handedness: Right

Women's singles
- Highest ranking: 14 (February, 2009)
- BWF profile
Medal record
Representing South Korea
Women's badminton
Sudirman Cup
Silver medal – second place	2009 Guangzhou	Mixed team
Bronze medal – third place	2007 Glasgow	Mixed team
Uber Cup
Silver medal – second place	2012 Wuhan	Women's team
Bronze medal – third place	2008 Jakarta	Women's team
Asian Games
Bronze medal – third place	2010 Guangzhou	Women's team
Bronze medal – third place	2006 Doha	Women's team
Bronze medal – third place	2006 Doha	Women's singles
Asian Junior Championships
Silver medal – second place	2002 Kuala Lumpur	Girls' team

Hwang Hye-youn (Korean: 황혜연; Hanja: 黃慧淵; born April 3, 1985, in Pocheon, Gyeonggi Province) is a retired female badminton player from South Korea.

Hwang started playing badminton at 7, at her local elementary school. Hwang who educated at the Pocheon High School, competed at the 2002 Asian Junior Championships, and won the silver medal in the girls' team event. She entered the South Korea national team in 2004. Although she won national championships in 2005 and 2006, she was not known internationally until she beat reigning World Champion Xie Xingfang en route to the final of the 2006 Thailand Open. Later that year, Hwang won the bronze medal at the Doha Asian Games. Her best Superseries result came when she reached the semi-final of the 2008 All England but that year, she suffered major disappointment when she was unable to make the top 16 to become the second Korean women's singles representative at the Beijing Olympics.

In late 2009, Hwang suffered a foot injury at a domestic event and by the time she returned to competition, her teammates Bae Seung-hee, Bae Yeon-ju, and Sung Ji-hyun had begun producing results and Hwang was not a member of Korea's Uber Cup-winning team in 2010. She remained on the national team for several more years before retiring from international competition. She continued to play for the Samsung Electromechanics pro team and became coach of their women's team in 2016.

== Achievements ==
=== Asian Games ===
Women's singles
Year	Venue	Opponent	Score	Result
2006	Aspire Hall 3, Doha, Qatar	(Hong Kong) Yip Pui Yin	14–21, 19–21	Bronze

=== IBF World Grand Prix ===
The World Badminton Grand Prix sanctioned by International Badminton Federation (IBF) since 1983.

Women's singles
Year	Tournament	Opponent	Score	Result
2006	Thailand Open	(China) Zhu Lin	13–21, 21–18, 15–21	(silver) Runner-up

=== BWF International Challenge/Series ===
Women's singles
Year	Tournament	Opponent	Score	Result
2008	Banuinvest International	(Russia) Olga Golovanova	21–13, 21–7	(gold) Winner

BWF International Challenge tournament
BWF International Series tournament
