= Greysia Polii =

Indonesian badminton player (born 1987)

- Polii when she announced her retirement from badminton in 2022

Personal information
- Born: 11 August 1987 (age 39) Jakarta, Indonesia
- Height: 1.64 m (5 ft 5 in)
- Weight: 57 kg (126 lb)

Sport
- Country: Indonesia
- Sport: Badminton
- Handedness: Right
- Coached by: Eng Hian; Chafidz Yusuf
- Retired: 12 June 2022

Women's & mixed doubles
- Career record: WD: 449 wins, 230 losses XD: 58 wins, 37 losses
- Highest ranking: 2 (with Nitya Krishinda Maheswari 28 January 2016); 3 (with Apriyani Rahayu 20 September 2018); 5 (with Meiliana Jauhari 12 May 2011); 9 (with Jo Novita 2006)
- BWF profile
Medal record
Women's badminton
Representing Indonesia
Olympic Games
Gold medal – first place	2020 Tokyo	Women's doubles
World Championships
Bronze medal – third place	2015 Jakarta	Women's doubles
Bronze medal – third place	2018 Nanjing	Women's doubles
Bronze medal – third place	2019 Basel	Women's doubles
Sudirman Cup
Silver medal – second place	2005 Beijing	Mixed team
Silver medal – second place	2007 Glasgow	Mixed team
Bronze medal – third place	2009 Guangzhou	Mixed team
Bronze medal – third place	2011 Qingdao	Mixed team
Bronze medal – third place	2015 Dongguan	Mixed team
Bronze medal – third place	2019 Nanning	Mixed team
Uber Cup
Silver medal – second place	2008 Jakarta	Women's team
Bronze medal – third place	2010 Kuala Lumpur	Women's team
Asian Games
Gold medal – first place	2014 Incheon	Women's doubles
Bronze medal – third place	2010 Guangzhou	Women's team
Bronze medal – third place	2018 Jakarta–Palembang	Women's doubles
Bronze medal – third place	2018 Jakarta–Palembang	Women's team
Asian Championships
Bronze medal – third place	2005 Hyderabad	Women's doubles
Bronze medal – third place	2016 Wuhan	Women's doubles
Asia Team Championships
Bronze medal – third place	2018 Alor Setar	Women's team
SEA Games
Gold medal – first place	2007 Nakhon Ratchasima	Women's team
Gold medal – first place	2019 Philippines	Women's doubles
Silver medal – second place	2005 Manila	Women's doubles
Silver medal – second place	2007 Nakhon Ratchasima	Women's doubles
Silver medal – second place	2009 Vientiane	Women's team
Silver medal – second place	2013 Naypyidaw	Women's doubles
Silver medal – second place	2019 Philippines	Women's team
Bronze medal – third place	2005 Manila	Women's team
Bronze medal – third place	2017 Kuala Lumpur	Women's team
World Junior Championships
Silver medal – second place	2004 Richmond	Mixed doubles
Bronze medal – third place	2004 Richmond	Girls' doubles
Bronze medal – third place	2004 Richmond	Mixed team
Asian Junior Championships
Bronze medal – third place	2004 Hwacheon	Girls' team
Bronze medal – third place	2005 Jakarta	Girls' doubles
Bronze medal – third place	2005 Jakarta	Girls' team

Greysia Polii (Indonesian pronunciation: [ˈgrɛjsi̯a poˈliʔi]; born 11 August 1987) is an Indonesian badminton player specializing in doubles. She won gold medals in the women's doubles at the 2014 Asian Games, at the 2019 SEA Games and at the 2020 Summer Olympics. She also won three bronze medals at the World Championships in 2015, 2018, and 2019. Polii is a member of BWF Athletes' Commission to represent the needs and views of athletes to the BWF council and committees from 2013 to 2017 and 2021 to 2025.

Having started her career at the Jaya Raya in Jakarta, she later was selected to join the national team in 2003. Polii represented her country in the 2012, 2016 and at the 2020 Summer Olympics. She also featured in the Indonesian women's winning team at the 2007 SEA Games. She reached a career high of world number 2 in the BWF women's doubles rankings alongside Nitya Krishinda Maheswari.

Polii's achievements began when she was paired with Jo Novita, winning a Grand Prix title, two silver medals at the SEA Games in 2005 and 2007, and a bronze in the 2005 Asian Championships. Together with Maheswari, she collected 2 Superseries titles, 3 Grand Prix titles, a gold at the 2014 Asian Games, a silver at the 2013 SEA Games, and bronze medals at the 2015 World and 2016 Asian Championships. She made a new partnership with the youngster Apriyani Rahayu in 2017. Together with Rahayu, she won her first women's doubles gold at the SEA Games in 2019, her first title on home soil at the 2020 Indonesia Masters, and Indonesia's first ever women's doubles gold at the 2020 Summer Olympics.

== Early life ==
Greysia Polii was born in Jakarta to Willy Polii and Evie Pakasi, both of Minahasa descent native to North Sulawesi. She is the third of five siblings. She lived in Jakarta until her dad died when she was only 2, and moved to Manado, where she spent her childhood. She was influenced to play badminton by her sister, and by former national player Deyana Lomban. She also idolized Susi Susanti and Zhang Ning. Her talent was already apparent by the time she was six years old. Recognizing her talent, she and her mother moved back to Jakarta in 1995 for better training and a chance to develop her career as a badminton player. Polii decided to join the Jaya Raya Jakarta club.

At the club, her coach Retno Kustijah noticed her talent as a doubles player, and thus, when Polii was 14, she made the decision to switch from singles to doubles. She made it to the national team in 2003.

Polii's given name, Greysia, was created by combining the word "grey," referencing her father's grey hair at the time of her birth, with the last syllable of "Indonesia."

Her late older brother was named Rickettsia Polii, presumably inspired by the genus of bacteria Rickettsia. Combined with the surname Polii, the full name bears resemblance to a scientific Latin binomial name.

== Career ==
=== 2003–2005: Early career and National Championships title ===
Starting her career as a women's and mixed doubles player, Polii began to show her abilities at the age of 16. Partnered with Heni Budiman, she reached the semi-final stage in the 2003's Malaysia Satellite tournament. As a national team player, she won her first National Championships title with Budiman. The duo defeated East Kalimantan pair Indarti Issolina and Angeline de Pauw 8–15, 15–8, 15–7.

In 2004, Polii helped the national junior team win the girls' team bronze at the Asian Junior Badminton Championships and mixed team bronze at the World Junior Championships. She also claimed the World Junior silver in the mixed doubles with Muhammad Rijal, and the bronze medal in the girls' doubles with Budiman. She made her debut with the national team at the Uber Cup in 2004, where the team made the quarter-finals. Her best achievements in individual events during the year were reaching the quarter-finals at the Chinese Taipei Open and the Malaysia Open.

In 2005, Polii won bronze medals at the Asian Junior Championships in the girls' team and doubles (with Heni Budiman). In March, she and Budiman finished as the semi-finalists in the Swiss Open. Due to the hip injury suffered by Budiman at the Swiss Open, Polii made a new partnership with her senior Jo Novita in the beginning of 2005, and the duo won the bronze at the Asian Championships, as well as silver at the SEA Games. At the World Grand Prix event, the Polii-Novita partnership were semi-finalists at the Singapore and Hong Kong Open. Polii helped Indonesia reach the final stage of the Sudirman Cup, but the team lost 0–3 to China.

=== 2006–2008: World Grand Prix title ===
In 2006, Polii began her season competing at the All England Open. Together with Jo Novita, she lost in the second round to the third seeds from China, Yang Wei and Zhang Jiewen, in straight games. In May, Polii won her first IBF World Grand Prix title at the 2006 Philippines Open partnered with Novita. In the final they beat their compatriots Endang Nursugianti and Rani Mundiasti in straight games 21–16, 21–13. She also paired with Muhammad Rijal in the mixed doubles, losing in the semi-finals to the eventual champions from Thailand, Sudket Prapakamol and Saralee Thungthongkam. At the Indonesia Open held in Surabaya, Polii's run was ended by a partnership featuring Zhao Tingting in both the women's and mixed doubles. In June, Polii reached the semi-finals in the mixed doubles and quarter-finals in the women's doubles at the Singapore Open. On the East Asian tour held in July–August, her best achievement was being a finalist at the Korea Open – she and Novita were defeated by Yang Wei and Zhang Jiewen by a score of 10–21, 11–21. Together with Novita, she qualified to compete at the World Championships held in Madrid. The duo were defeated in the third round to first seeds and eventual champions from China Gao Ling and Huang Sui. Ranked as world number 10 in the women's doubles with Novita, Polii was ousted in the second round of the Japan Open both in the women's and mixed doubles. In the mixed doubles with Rijal, they lost to two-times Olympic champion Zhang Jun and Gao Ling in a rubber game 16–21, 22–20, 7–21. In November, the second seeded Polii-Novita reached the semi-finals of the Denmark Open before being defeated by Polish pair Kamila Augustyn and Nadieżda Kostiuczyk in a close rubber game 13–21, 21–19, 19–21. In December, she represented her country at the 2006 Doha Asian Games, but failed to contribute any points to the team, where Indonesia women's team fell in the repechage to the semi-finals stage. Due to an injury suffered by Novita during the matches against Malaysia in the group stage, Polii was paired with Pia Zebadiah Bernadet in the individual event, but they were upset in the second round by Japanese pair Miyuki Maeda and Satoko Suetsuna. She ended the 2006 season standing as world number 9 in the women's doubles.

Polii opened the 2007 season by playing at the Malaysia Open with new partner Vita Marissa. The duo advanced to the final, but were unable to defeat the three times World Champion Gao Ling and Huang Sui, although they forced the Chinese pair to play a deciding game. Seeing that this new couple had good prospects, the women's doubles coach Aryono Miranat continued their partnership. In the following tournaments, although they did not win a title, the pair managed to become semi-finalists at the Swiss Open and quarter-finalists at the All England and Singapore Open. In Switzerland, Polii also finished as the finalist in the mixed doubles with Muhammad Rijal. In June, she helped Indonesia finish second to China in the Sudirman Cup. In July, after Jo Novita recovered from an injury, the duo teamed up again and participated in the Thailand Open, China Masters, and Philippines Open. Their best results were when she and Novita reached the semi-finals in the Philippines. In the quarter-finals, they were able to beat the third seeds from China, Yang Wei and Zhao Tingting, in two close games 25–23, 24–22.

In August, Polii played at the World Championships in the women's and mixed doubles. In the second round of the women's doubles, she had to retire from the tournament due to an injury to her right knee ligament. On the European tour in October–November, her best result was a semi-final appearance in the French Open. At the National Championships held in Solo, teamed up with Novita, Polii successfully defended the title she won two years ago with Heni Budiman. In December, she featured in the Indonesian women's winning team at the SEA Games in Nakhon Ratchasima, Thailand, and won her second women's doubles silver at the Games.

In the first half of the 2008 season, together with her partners Jo Novita and Muhammad Rijal, Polii did not have satisfactory results, as her best achievements were being a women's doubles quarter-finalist in the German, All England, Indonesia, and Asian Championships. She was also a mixed doubles quarter-finalist in Korea, Germany, and India. In May, Polii helped Indonesia reach the final of the Uber Cup held in Jakarta, where the team finished as the runner-up. Polii later teamed up with Nitya Krishinda Maheswari in the women's doubles and with Flandy Limpele in the mixed doubles. Her best results with her new partner was as a women's doubles semi-finalist in the Denmark Open, defeating the 7th seeds Cheng Shu and Zhao Yunlei in the second round, and finishing as a mixed doubles quarter-finalist in the Japan Open and China Masters. Despite not being paired-up with Novita in the remaining 2008 tournaments, they were qualified to compete at the inaugural Superseries Masters Finals held in Kota Kinabalu, Malaysia. The duo reached the semi-finals, where they were defeated by their compatriots Liliyana Natsir and Vita Marissa in straight games 19–21, 17–21.

=== 2009–2012: National Championships double crowned, Olympic Games black card ===
In 2009, Polii focused on one discipline, playing only in the women's doubles with Nitya Krishinda Maheswari. Even though she fell in the early stages of two Europe tour events, the All England and Swiss Open, she reached the finals of Singapore Open. She and her partner beat the world number one Chin Eei Hui and Wong Pei Tty from Malaysia in the quarter-finals, followed by ninth-placed Lena Frier Kristiansen and Kamilla Rytter Juhl from Denmark in the semi-finals. In May, she was part of the Indonesia team who finished as semi-finalists in Sudirman Cup held in Guangzhou. Polii and Maheswari played at the World Championships in Hyderabad, India, as 13th seeds. Their journey at the championships stopped in the third round with defeat to the 2008 Olympic gold medalists, the 5th seeded Du Jing and Yu Yang in straight games 20–22, 12–21. She later managed to reach the semi-finals in the Japan and French Open, but was beaten by Chinese pair Ma Jin and Wang Xiaoli in both tournaments. In December, Polii participated at the SEA Games in Vientiane, Laos. She won the silver medal in the women's team, and as second seeds in the individual women's doubles event, she and Maheswari had a bye in the first round, but their progress was stopped by young Thai pair Savitree Amitrapai and Vacharaporn Munkit in the quarter-finals. As a pair with Maheswari, she spent time inside the top 10 of the BWF rankings.

In January 2010, Polii was crowned a double champion at the 2009 National Championships, winning the women's doubles with Meiliana Jauhari, and the mixed doubles with Tontowi Ahmad. As a new pair, the Polii–Jauhari partnership were considered successful at the Super Series stage, they were the semi-finalists in the Singapore Open; quarter-finalists in All England, Indonesia Open, and China Masters. The pair were also the finalists in the Macau and Indonesia Grand Prix Gold. She also was a quarter-finalist at the Asian Championships both in the women's doubles with Jauhari and the mixed doubles with Ahmad, and part of the national team that won the bronze medal at the Uber Cup and Asian Games. At the end of the season, she was ranked as women's doubles world number 9 in the BWF World ranking, and number 8 in the Super Series ranking, made her able to compete at the Super Series Finals in Taipei, though she did not advance to the semi-final, after placed third in the group stage.

In 2011, Polii alongside Meiliana Jauhari was not able to win a title. Her best results at the Super Series event was the semi-finals in the India Open; she was also a quarter-finalist in Singapore and Indonesia Open. In the second round of the Indonesia Open, a Super Series Premier event, Polii received a yellow card from the umpire, for taking too much time during a close match against Ma Jin and Pan Pan. At the Grand Prix event, she was a finalist in the Chinese Taipei Open; semi-finalist in Malaysia and Swiss Open. In the final of the Chinese Taipei Open against Korean pair Ha Jung-eun and Kim Min-jung, Polii had to retire in the third game, and undergo treatment at the hospital, after sustaining a right shoulder injury in the second game. The injury then made Polii often struggled with the backhand serve.

In August, Polii and Jauhari competed at the World Championships in London. The duo lost in the quarter-finals to Miyuki Maeda and Satoko Suetsuna, worsening their head-to-head record against that pair to 0–4. Polii was part of the national team that won the bronze medal at the Sudirman Cup, where Indonesia lost in the semi-finals to Denmark by a score of 1–3.

In 2012, Polii started the season by making the quarter-finals in the Korea Open Super Series Premier with her partner Meiliana Jauhari. She later was defeated in the early rounds of some tournaments, including the Super Series event of Malaysia, All England, and the India Open. In June, she reached the semi-finals of Indonesia and the Singapore Open. She managed to reduce her head-to-head deficit against the Japanese pair Miyuki Maeda and Satoko Suetsuna to 1–4, after she and Jauhari beat them in quarter-finals of the Indonesia Open.

At the 2012 Summer Olympics, Polii and her partner Meiliana Jauhari, along with Jung Kyung-eun and Kim Ha-na, Ha Jung-eun and Kim Min-jung of South Korea, and Wang Xiaoli and Yu Yang of China were disqualified from the competition for "not using one's best efforts to win a match" and "conducting oneself in a manner that is clearly abusive or detrimental to the sport" following matches the previous evening during which they threw the match. Greysia Polii and her partner Meiliana Jauhari played against South Korea's Ha Jung-eun and Kim Min-jung. Indonesia filed an appeal to the case, but it was withdrawn.

=== 2013–2015: First Grand Prix Gold, Super Series, and Asian Games champion ===
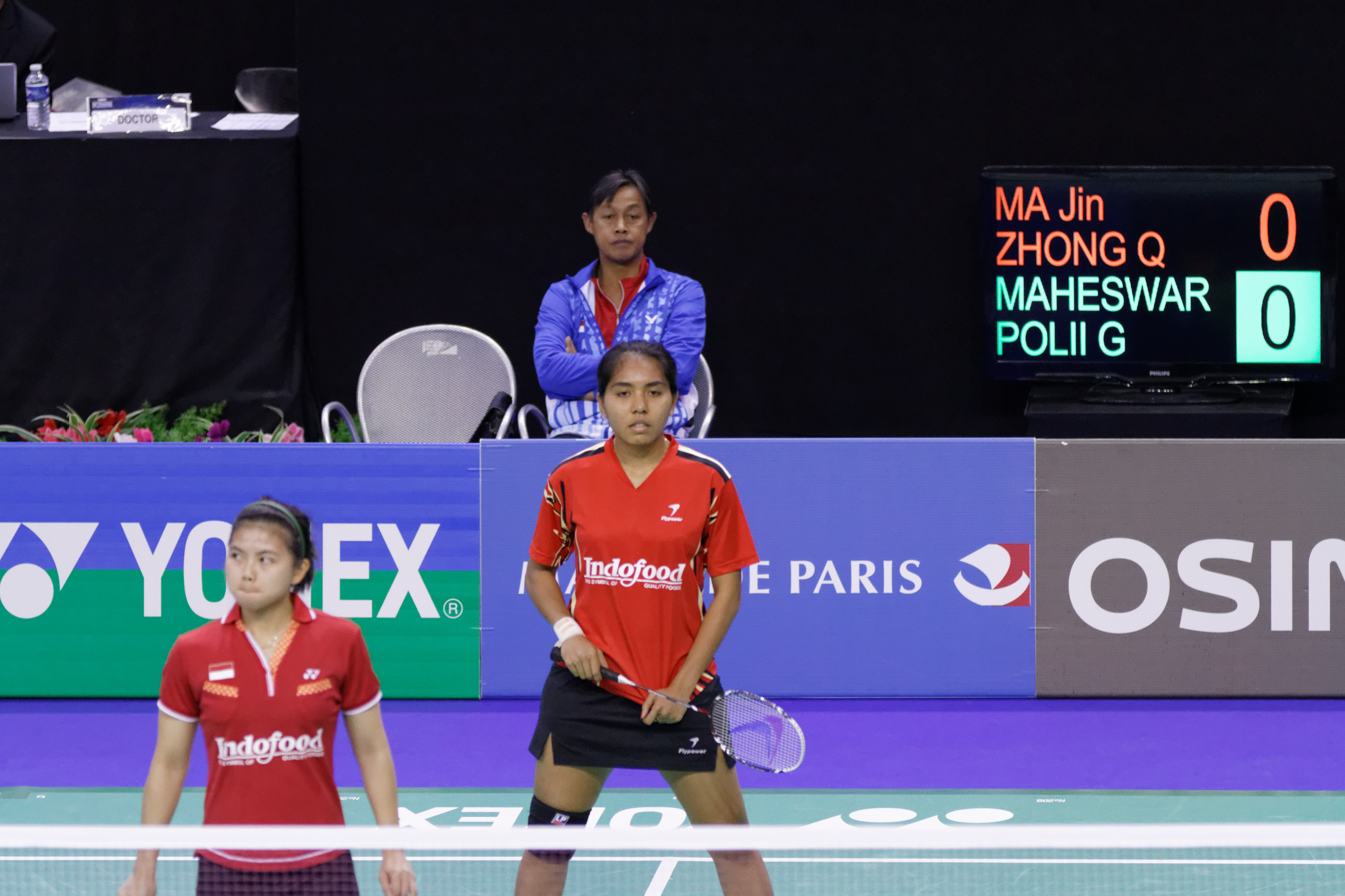
Polii and her partner Nitya Krishinda Maheswari in 2013 French Super Series

In 2013, Polii started the season with Meiliana Jauhari, but was defeated in the initial round of Korea and Malaysia Open. Polii later paired with youngster Anggia Shitta Awanda, a silver medalist at the 2011 World Junior Championships. The Polii-Awanda partnership did not last long, with their best result in four tournaments being the quarter-finals of the New Zealand Open. In March, Polii was elected to serve a four-year term as a member of BWF Athletes' Commission to represent the needs and views of athletes to the BWF council and committees.

In preparation for Indonesia's participation in the Sudirman Cup in Kuala Lumpur, Polii resumed her partnership with Nitya Krishinda Maheswari. In their first game back together in Kuala Lumpur, the pair managed to contribute one point for Indonesia against India. At the second tournament for Polii and Maheswari after four years separated, she finally won her first Grand Prix Gold title in the Thailand Open. She and Maheswari beat Japanese pair Yuriko Miki and Koharu Yonemoto in the final with the score of 21–7, 21–13. At the Super Series event, they later finished as semi-finalists in Singapore and the French Open; also quarter-finalists in Indonesia Open and China Masters. In the French Open, she and Maheswari beat the world number one and first seeded pairing from China, Wang Xiaoli and Yu Yang in a close rubber game, 21–17, 14–21, 23–21. In December, she won her third women's doubles silver medal at the SEA Games held in Myanmar.

In 2014, Polii began the season as a semi-finalist in the Korea Open and quarter-finalist in the Malaysia Open with Nitya Krishinda Maheswari. In March, she became a finalist in the Swiss Open Grand Prix Gold after beating the first seeded Christinna Pedersen and Kamilla Rytter Juhl in the quarter-finals and the 7th seeded Luo Ying and Luo Yu in the semi-finals. Later she and Maheswari were defeated by the 2nd seeded Bao Yixin and Tang Jinhua 21–19, 16–21, 13–21. In four meetings against Bao and Tang, each match had ended with a rubber game, and after the loss in Switzerland, the head-to-head record between the pairs stood at 0–4. At the quarter-finals of the Singapore Open, she and Maheswari were defeated for fifth time by Bao and Tang, this time losing in two close games 20–22, 20–22. In May, she participated at the Uber Cup held in New Delhi, but the team were eliminated in the quarter-finals. In June, she competed in the Indonesia Open in the women's doubles with Maheswari and mixed doubles with Kevin Sanjaya Sukamuljo. In both events, she lost in the second round, but in the mixed doubles, she and Sukamuljo were able to upset the defending champions and world number one Zhang Nan and Zhao Yunlei in the first round with the score of 15–21, 21–18, 23–21.

In July 2014, Polii claimed her second BWF Grand Prix Gold title with Nitya Krishinda Maheswari in the Chinese Taipei Open, beating Wang Xiaoli and Yu Yang in the final. She qualified to compete in the World Championships in Copenhagen, but lost to Reika Kakiiwa and Miyuki Maeda in the quarter-finals. In September, Polii won the women's doubles gold medal at the Asian Games in Incheon, South Korea, partnered with Maheswari. En route to the gold medal, she and Maheswari beat 3rd seeds Kakiiwa and Maeda in the quarter-finals, 2nd seeds Tian Qing and Zhao Yunlei in the semi-finals, and 1st seeds Misaki Matsutomo and Ayaka Takahashi in the final. After finishing as quarter-finalists in the China Open, and semi-finalists in the Hong Kong Open, she and Maheswari played in the Dubai World Superseries Finals, but had to retire from the competition due to an injury suffered by Maheswari in the opening match against Kakiiwa and Maeda.

In 2015, Polii opened the season as a quarter-finalist in the Malaysia Masters partnered with Nitya Krishinda Maheswari. She and her partner were also eliminated in the quarter-finals of All England, Malaysia, and Australia Open. In May, she was part of the Indonesia team that won the bronze medal of Sudirman Cup in Dongguan, China. In June, she and Maheswari made it to the final of the Indonesia Open, but they were not able to win the title after losing to Tian Qing and Tang Jinhua in the final. Polii and Maheswari managed to retain their title in the Chinese Taipei Open after beating world number one Misaki Matsutomo and Ayaka Takahashi in the semi-finals, and the second seeded world number 3 Luo Ying and Luo Yu in the final.

In August, Polii and Maheswari won a bronze medal in the World Championships in Jakarta. A month later, they then captured their first Super Series title in the Korea Open. At several Super Series tournaments at the end of 2015, she finished as a semi-finalist in French, Hong Kong, and Dubai World Superseries Finals, and as a finalist in a Grand Prix Gold event, the Indonesian Masters. She and Maheswari ended the season as world number 3 in the BWF World rankings.

=== 2016: World number 2, and Rio Olympics ===
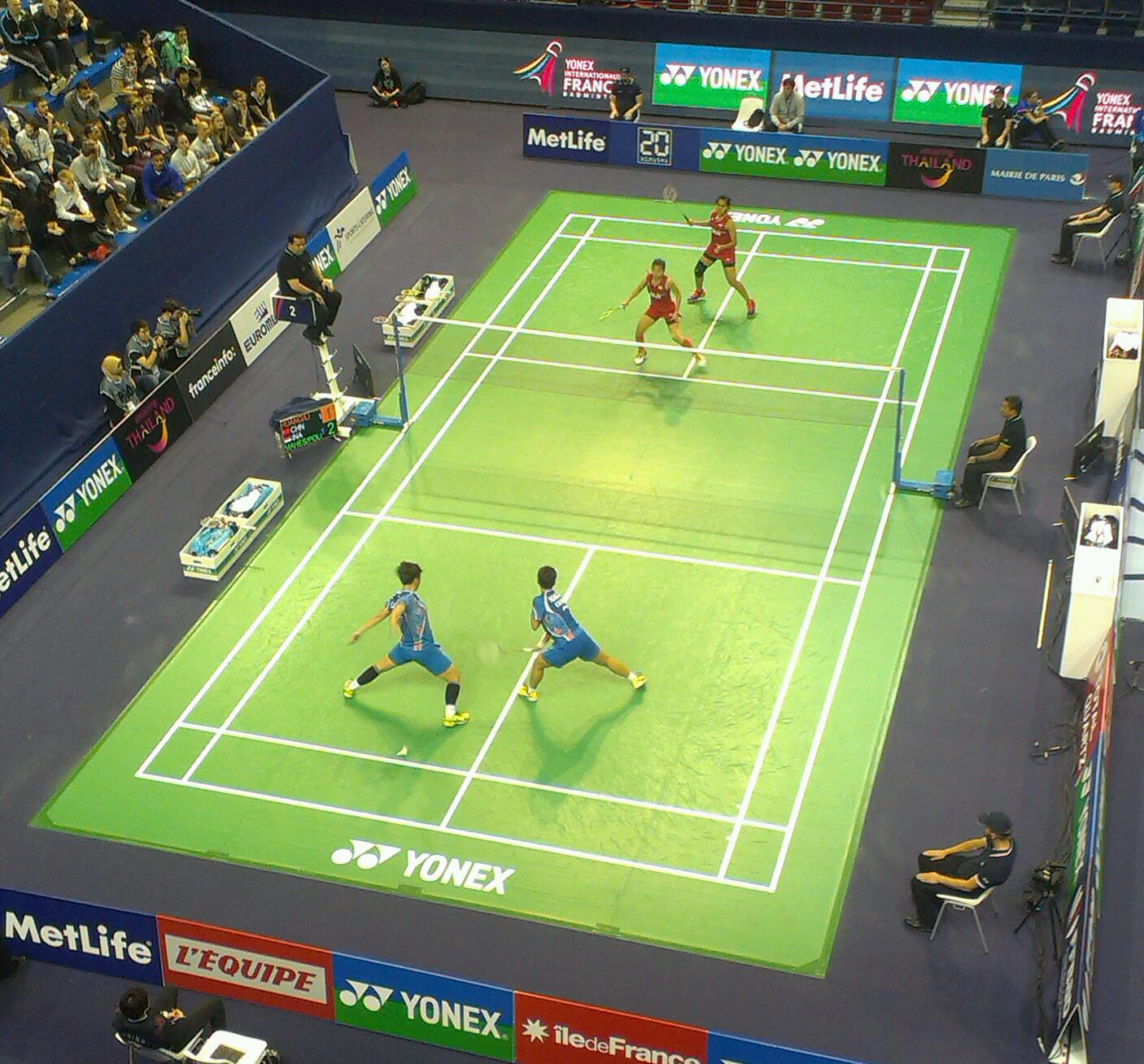
Polii and Maheswari at the quarter-finals of 2016 French Open against Li Yinhui and Huang Dongping

In January, Polii and Nitya Krishinda Maheswari reached a career high as world number 2 in the women's doubles. She and Maheswari started the season in March, and finished as semi finalists in the German Open, losing in the final to Thai pair Puttita Supajirakul and Sapsiree Taerattanachai in a close rubber game. In April, the duo also reached the semi-finals in India and the Malaysia Open, and then they won their second Super Series title together in the Singapore Open without stepping on court, after their opponents Misaki Matsutomo and Ayaka Takahashi withdrew from the final match due to an injury suffered by Matsutomo in the semi-finals. Polii and Maheswasi won the bronze medal in Asian Championships held in Wuhan, losing in the semi-finals to Naoko Fukuman and Kurumi Yonao in a close rubber game by the score of 21–13, 19–21, 22–24. The match lasted two hours, 41 minutes, setting a record for the longest badminton match ever. In May, she alongside the Indonesian women's team competed in the Uber Cup in Kunshan, China, but the team lost in the quarter-finals to South Korea. In June, Polii and Maheswari finished as runners-up in the Australian Open, defeated by Bao Yixin and Chen Qingchen.

She made her second appearance at the Summer Olympics in Rio de Janeiro, Brazil, this time with Maheswari. The duo won three matches in the group stage and advanced to the knocked-out stage. In the quarter-finals, they lost to Chinese pair Tang Yuanting and Yu Yang in straight games 11–21, 14–21. At the European tour in October, she and her partner reached the semi-finals in Denmark and quarter-finals in the French Open. The duo were qualified for the BWF Superseries Finals. However, they withdrew from the tournament due to Maheswari's scheduled knee surgery and their position was taken by Vivian Hoo and Woon Khe Wei.

=== 2017: New partner, French Open and second Thailand Open title ===
Due to an injury suffered by Maheswari, Polii tried partnerships with Rosyita Eka Putri Sari and Rizki Amelia Pradipta. Together with Putri Sari, she reached the semi-finals in the Thailand Masters, losing to Chen Qingchen and Jia Yifan, while with Pradipta, the duo lost in the second round of the European tour in the German, All England and Swiss Open. In May, Polii partnered with Apriyani Rahayu, and they competed as a new pair at the Sudirman Cup in Gold Coast, Australia. Even though they had only been paired for about a month, the duo won their first title in the Thailand Open after defeating the home pair Chayanit Chaladchalam and Phataimas Muenwong in straight games 21–12, 21–12 in the final. They also won the Superseries title at the French Open, just five months into their partnership. Other achievements by Polii and Rahayu in 2017 were runner-up in Hong Kong, semi-finalists in New Zealand, and quarter-finalists in Korea Open. Polii also helped the Indonesia women's team win the bronze medal at the SEA Games held in Kuala Lumpur, unfortunately, in the individual women's doubles event, she and Rahayu lost in the first round to eventual champion Jongkolphan Kititharakul and Rawinda Prajongjai of Thailand. The Polii and Rahayu partnership, first paired in May, reached a career high as world number 10 in the BWF World rankings in November.

=== 2018: India Open and third Thailand Open title ===
In January, Polii and Apriyani Rahayu began the season by finishing as runners-up in the Indonesia Masters, losing to second seeded Misaki Matsutomo and Ayaka Takahashi in the final. A month later, the duo played as the third seeds in the India Open and won the title after beating the first-seeded Christinna Pedersen and Kamilla Rytter Juhl in the semi-finals, and the second-seeded Jongkolphan Kititharakul and Rawinda Prajongjai in the final. She featured in the Indonesian women's team that won bronze at the Asia Team Championships held in Alor Setar and were quarter-finalists in the Uber Cup in Bangkok. In July, she and her partner lost in the quarter-finals of the Indonesia Open to Yuki Fukushima and Sayaka Hirota, but a week later, she won her third Thailand Open title, as she and Rahayu defended the title they had won in Thailand the previous year, when the event was known as the Grand Prix. In August, the duo won the bronze medal at the World Championships in Nanjing, and further bronze medals at the Asian Games in the women's doubles and team events. In the remainder of the 2018 tour, she and Rahayu only reached the semi-finals in Japan, China, Denmark, French, Hong Kong, and quarter-finals in the Fuzhou China Open. The duo achieved their career high as world number 3 in the BWF rankings in September.

=== 2019–2022: Second India Open, first SEA Games, home soil title and Olympic Games gold medal ===
Polii opened the 2019 season as a finalist in the Malaysia Masters with Apriyani Rahayu. In the semi-finals, they beat their arch-rivals Misaki Matsutomo and Ayaka Takahashi in a close rubber game, improving their head-to-head record against the Japanese pair to 2–8. A week later, they again lost to Matsutomo and Takahashi in the Indonesia Masters. They led 18–10 in the first game, but lost it 20–22, eventually losing the match in a close rubber game. In March, she and Rahayu lost in the quarter-finals of both the German and All England Open. Polii and Rahayu then clinched their second India Open title defeating Chow Mei Kuan and Lee Meng Yean in the final. In May, she alongside the Indonesia team finished as semi-finalists in the Sudirman Cup in Nanning, settling for the bronze medal. In June, she and Rahayu advanced to the semi-finals of the Australian Open after beating the first seeded, world number one Mayu Matsumoto and Wakana Nagahara in the quarter-finals, but the duo were beaten by Chinese pair Chen Qingchen and Jia Yifan, the fifth defeat in seven meetings between them. At the World Championships in Basel, Switzerland, she and her partner won the bronze medal, after defeat in the semi-finals to eventual champions Matsumoto and Nagahara. After the World Championships, her coach, Eng Hian, evaluated that she and Rahayu had fallen short of their previous standard. In the end of 2019 season, their best results were only the semi-finalists in Chinese Taipei Open, after that, they often lost in the initial stage. She finally won her first women's doubles gold medal at the SEA Games, having made her debut at the Games 14 years ago. She and Rahayu defeated Chayanit Chaladchalam and Phataimas Muenwong of Thailand 21–3, 21–18.

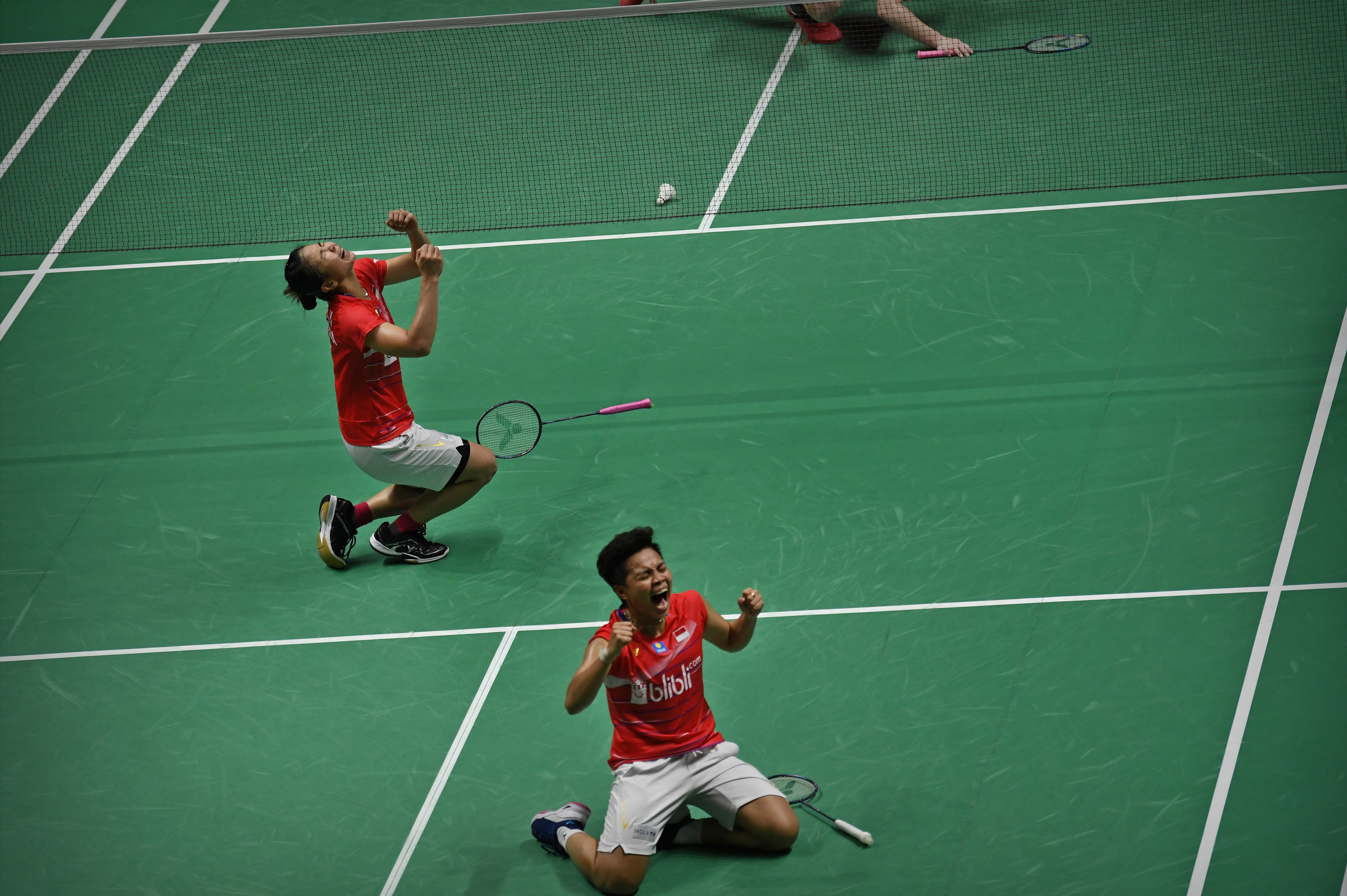
Polii and Apriyani Rahayu celebrates after winning 2020 Indonesia Masters

In 2020, Polii and Apriyani Rahayu who ranked as world number eight started their tour in the Malaysia Masters. At that tournament, they finished as semi-finalists defeated by Chinese pair Li Wenmei and Zheng Yu in a rubber game. A week later in the Indonesia Masters, Polii won her first ever international title in Indonesia, after she and Rahayu triumphed in a thrilling match against Maiken Fruergaard and Sara Thygesen of Denmark. In February, she won her second title of the year by winning the Barcelona Spain Masters. In the final, she and Rahayu defeated Gabriela and Stefani Stoeva of Bulgaria in a rubber game. In March All England Open, she and her partner lost in the first round to Korean pair Chang Ye-na and Kim Hye-rin in straight games. Due to the COVID-19 pandemic, numerous tournaments on the 2020 BWF World Tour were either cancelled or rescheduled for later in the year. In June, Polii then took part at the PBSI home tournament partnered with Febby Valencia Dwijayanti Gani. The duo finished third at that tournament. Polii returned in the international competitions at the 2020 Asian Leg tournament in January 2021. Together with Rahayu, she won her first ever BWF Super 1000 tournament, the Yonex Thailand Open. She dedicated the title to her elder brother, Rickettsia, a father-figure to her ever since their father's death when she was a child, who died after Polii's wedding in December 2020. A week later in the semi-finals of the Toyota Thailand Open, Polii and Rahayu fell in two games to Lee So-hee and Shin Seung-chan of South Korea. The duo then played at the World Tour Finals, but was eliminated in the group stage.

In 2021, Polii scheduled to participating at the All England Open, but later Indonesia team were forced to withdraw from the competition by BWF after the team members will self-isolate for 10 days from the date of their inbound flight after an anonym person traveling onboard tested positive for COVID-19.

Polii qualified to compete in the women's doubles event at the 2020 Tokyo Summer Olympics. She competed in her third straight Summer Olympics with debutant Apriyani Rahayu. In the final, they defeated the 2017 World Champions Chen Qingchen and Jia Yifan in two straight games, 21–19, and 21–15. Polii and Rahayu became the first unseeded pair to win the gold medal in women's doubles. This was Indonesia's first Olympic Games gold in women's doubles. At 33 years and 356 days, Polii is the oldest female badminton player to win a gold medal at the Olympics. With this win, Indonesia became just the second country after China to have won gold medals in all five disciplines of badminton at the Summer Olympics. After her Olympic success, the Student Sports Training Center in Jakarta was named after Polii and fellow olympian Apriyani Rahayu.

In December 2021, Polii was elected as BWF Athletes' Commission, and has been appointed as the chair of the commission in February 2022. Polii officially announced her retirement from the international badminton tournament at the Istora Senayan on 12 June 2022.

== Awards and nominations ==
Award	Year	Category	Result	Ref.
Badzine Fair Play Trophy	2009	Fair Play Athlete	Won	
AORI	2014	Favourite Athlete	Won	
Indonesian Sport Awards	2018	Favorite Women's Doubles Athlete with Apriyani Rahayu	Won	
Indonesian Sport Awards	2018	Favorite Women's Team Athlete with 2018 Asian Games women's badminton team	Won	
BWF Awards	2020/2021	Pair of the Year with Apriyani Rahayu	Won	
Gatra Awards	2021	Sports Category with Apriyani Rahayu	Won	
Line Today Choice	2021	Most Favorite Indonesian Athlete with Apriyani Rahayu	Won	

== Achievements ==
=== Olympic Games ===
Women's doubles
Year	Venue	Partner	Opponent	Score	Result	Ref.
2020	Musashino Forest Sports Plaza; Tokyo, Japan	(Indonesia) Apriyani Rahayu	(China) Chen Qingchen (China) Jia Yifan	21–19, 21–15	Gold	

=== BWF World Championships ===
Women's doubles
Year	Venue	Partner	Opponent	Score	Result	Ref.
2015	Istora Senayan; Jakarta, Indonesia	(Indonesia) Nitya Krishinda Maheswari	(China) Tian Qing (China) Zhao Yunlei	8–21, 16–21	Bronze	
2018	Nanjing Youth Olympic Sports Park; Nanjing, China	(Indonesia) Apriyani Rahayu	(Japan) Mayu Matsumoto (Japan) Wakana Nagahara	12–21, 21–23	Bronze	
2019	St. Jakobshalle; Basel, Switzerland	(Indonesia) Apriyani Rahayu	(Japan) Mayu Matsumoto (Japan) Wakana Nagahara	12–21, 19–21	Bronze	

=== Asian Games ===
Women's doubles
Year	Venue	Partner	Opponent	Score	Result	Ref.
2014	Gyeyang Gymnasium; Incheon, South Korea	(Indonesia) Nitya Krishinda Maheswari	(Japan) Misaki Matsutomo (Japan) Ayaka Takahashi	21–15, 21–9	Gold	
2018	Istora Gelora Bung Karno; Jakarta, Indonesia	(Indonesia) Apriyani Rahayu	(Japan) Misaki Matsutomo (Japan) Ayaka Takahashi	15–21, 17–21	Bronze	

=== Asian Championships ===
Women's doubles
Year	Venue	Partner	Opponent	Score	Result	Ref.
2005	Gachibowli Indoor Stadium, Hyderabad, India	(Indonesia) Jo Novita	(Japan) Kumiko Ogura (Japan) Reiko Shiota	10–15, 4–15	Bronze	
2016	Wuhan Sports Center Gymnasium, Wuhan, China	(Indonesia) Nitya Krishinda Maheswari	(Japan) Naoko Fukuman (Japan) Kurumi Yonao	21–13, 19–21, 22–24	Bronze	

=== SEA Games ===
Women's doubles
Year	Venue	Partner	Opponent	Score	Result	Ref.
2005	PhilSports Arena; Metro Manila, Philippines	(Indonesia) Jo Novita	(Malaysia) Chin Eei Hui (Malaysia) Wong Pei Tty	12–15, 15–9, 13–15	Silver	
2007	Wongchawalitkul University; Nakhon Ratchasima, Thailand	(Indonesia) Jo Novita	(Indonesia) Vita Marissa (Indonesia) Liliyana Natsir	15–21, 14–21	Silver	
2013	Wunna Theikdi Indoor Stadium; Naypyidaw, Myanmar	(Indonesia) Nitya Krishinda Maheswari	(Malaysia) Vivian Hoo (Malaysia) Woon Khe Wei	17–21, 21–18, 17–21	Silver	
2019	Muntinlupa Sports Complex; Metro Manila, Philippines	(Indonesia) Apriyani Rahayu	(Thailand) Chayanit Chaladchalam (Thailand) Phataimas Muenwong	21–3, 21–18	Gold	

=== IBF World Junior Championships ===
Girls' doubles
Year	Venue	Partner	Opponent	Score	Result	Ref.
2004	Minoru Arena; Richmond, Canada	(Indonesia) Heni Budiman	(China) Tian Qing (China) Yu Yang	1–15, 2–15	Bronze	

Mixed doubles
Year	Venue	Partner	Opponent	Score	Result	Ref.
2004	Minoru Arena; Richmond, Canada	(Indonesia) Muhammad Rijal	(China) He Hanbin (China) Yu Yang	12–15, 12–15	Silver	

=== Asian Junior Championships ===
Girls' doubles
Year	Venue	Partner	Opponent	Score	Result	Ref.
2005	Tennis Indoor Senayan, Jakarta, Indonesia	(Indonesia) Nitya Krishinda Maheswari	(China) Cheng Shu (China) Liao Jingmei	15–7, 15–17, 13–15	Bronze	

=== BWF World Tour (6 titles, 3 runners-up) ===
The BWF World Tour, which was announced on 19 March 2017 and implemented in 2018, is a series of elite badminton tournaments sanctioned by the Badminton World Federation (BWF). The BWF World Tour is divided into levels of World Tour Finals, Super 1000, Super 750, Super 500, Super 300 (part of the HSBC World Tour), and the BWF Tour Super 100.

Women's doubles
Year	Tournament	Level	Partner	Opponent	Score	Result	Ref.
2018	Indonesia Masters	Super 500	(Indonesia) Apriyani Rahayu	(Japan) Misaki Matsutomo (Japan) Ayaka Takahashi	17–21, 12–21	(silver) Runner-up	
2018	India Open	Super 500	(Indonesia) Apriyani Rahayu	(Thailand) Jongkolphan Kititharakul (Thailand) Rawinda Prajongjai	21–18, 21–15	(gold) Winner	
2018	Thailand Open	Super 500	(Indonesia) Apriyani Rahayu	(Japan) Misaki Matsutomo (Japan) Ayaka Takahashi	21–13, 21–10	(gold) Winner	
2019	Malaysia Masters	Super 500	(Indonesia) Apriyani Rahayu	(Japan) Yuki Fukushima (Japan) Sayaka Hirota	21–18, 16–21, 16–21	(silver) Runner-up	
2019	India Open	Super 500	(Indonesia) Apriyani Rahayu	(Malaysia) Chow Mei Kuan (Malaysia) Lee Meng Yean	21–11, 25–23	(gold) Winner	
2020	Indonesia Masters	Super 500	(Indonesia) Apriyani Rahayu	(Denmark) Maiken Fruergaard (Denmark) Sara Thygesen	18–21, 21–11, 23–21	(gold) Winner	
2020	Spain Masters	Super 300	(Indonesia) Apriyani Rahayu	(Bulgaria) Gabriela Stoeva (Bulgaria) Stefani Stoeva	18–21, 22–20, 21–17	(gold) Winner	
2020 (I)	Thailand Open	Super 1000	(Indonesia) Apriyani Rahayu	(Thailand) Jongkolphan Kititharakul (Thailand) Rawinda Prajongjai	21–15, 21–12	(gold) Winner	
2021	Indonesia Open	Super 1000	(Indonesia) Apriyani Rahayu	(Japan) Nami Matsuyama (Japan) Chiharu Shida	19–21, 19–21	(silver) Runner-up	

=== BWF Superseries (3 titles, 6 runners-up) ===
The BWF Superseries, which was launched on 14 December 2006 and implemented in 2007, was a series of elite badminton tournaments, sanctioned by the Badminton World Federation (BWF). BWF Superseries levels were Superseries and Superseries Premier. A season of Superseries consisted of twelve tournaments around the world that had been introduced since 2011. Successful players were invited to the Superseries Finals, which were held at the end of each year.

Women's doubles
Year	Tournament	Partner	Opponent	Score	Result	Ref.
2007	Malaysia Open	(Indonesia) Vita Marissa	(China) Gao Ling (China) Huang Sui	21–19, 12–21, 11–21	(silver) Runner-up	
2009	Singapore Open	(Indonesia) Nitya Krishinda Maheswari	(China) Zhang Yawen (China) Zhao Tingting	14–21, 13–21	(silver) Runner-up	
2015	Indonesia Open	(Indonesia) Nitya Krishinda Maheswari	(China) Tang Jinhua (China) Tian Qing	11–21, 10–21	(silver) Runner-up	
2015	Korea Open	(Indonesia) Nitya Krishinda Maheswari	(South Korea) Chang Ye-na (South Korea) Lee So-hee	21–15, 21–18	(gold) Winner	
2016	Singapore Open	(Indonesia) Nitya Krishinda Maheswari	(Japan) Misaki Matsutomo (Japan) Ayaka Takahashi	Walkover	(gold) Winner	
2016	Australian Open	(Indonesia) Nitya Krishinda Maheswari	(China) Bao Yixin (China) Chen Qingchen	21–23, 17–21	(silver) Runner-up	
2017	French Open	(Indonesia) Apriyani Rahayu	(South Korea) Lee So-hee (South Korea) Shin Seung-chan	21–17, 21–15	(gold) Winner	
2017	Hong Kong Open	(Indonesia) Apriyani Rahayu	(China) Chen Qingchen (China) Jia Yifan	21–14, 16–21, 15–21	(silver) Runner-up	

Mixed doubles
Year	Tournament	Partner	Opponent	Score	Result	Ref.
2007	Swiss Open	(Indonesia) Muhammad Rijal	(South Korea) Lee Yong-dae (South Korea) Lee Hyo-jung	21–14, 16–21, 18–21	(silver) Runner-up	

BWF Super Series Finals tournament
BWF Super Series Premier tournament
BWF Super Series tournament

=== BWF Grand Prix (5 titles, 6 runners-up) ===
The BWF Grand Prix had two levels, the Grand Prix and Grand Prix Gold. It was a series of badminton tournaments sanctioned by the Badminton World Federation (BWF) and played between 2007 and 2017. The World Badminton Grand Prix was sanctioned by the International Badminton Federation from 1983 to 2006.

Women's doubles
Year	Tournament	Partner	Opponent	Score	Result	Ref.
2006	Korea Open	(Indonesia) Jo Novita	(China) Yang Wei (China) Zhang Jiewen	10–21, 11–21	(silver) Runner-up	
2006	Philippines Open	(Indonesia) Jo Novita	(Indonesia) Rani Mundiasti (Indonesia) Endang Nursugianti	21–16, 21–13	(gold) Winner	
2010	Macau Open	(Indonesia) Meiliana Jauhari	(Chinese Taipei) Cheng Wen-hsing (Chinese Taipei) Chien Yu-chin	21–16, 18–21, 16–21	(silver) Runner-up	
2010	Indonesia Grand Prix Gold	(Indonesia) Meiliana Jauhari	(China) Luo Ying (China) Luo Yu	21–11, 18–21, 11–21	(silver) Runner-up	
2011	Chinese Taipei Open	(Indonesia) Meiliana Jauhari	(South Korea) Ha Jung-eun (South Korea) Kim Min-jung	21–14, 18–21, 0–2 retired	(silver) Runner-up	
2013	Thailand Open	(Indonesia) Nitya Krishinda Maheswari	(Japan) Yuriko Miki (Japan) Koharu Yonemoto	21–7, 21–13	(gold) Winner	
2014	Swiss Open	(Indonesia) Nitya Krishinda Maheswari	(China) Bao Yixin (China) Tang Jinhua	21–19, 16–21, 13–21	(silver) Runner-up	
2014	Chinese Taipei Open	(Indonesia) Nitya Krishinda Maheswari	(China) Wang Xiaoli (China) Yu Yang	21–18, 21–11	(gold) Winner	
2015	Chinese Taipei Open	(Indonesia) Nitya Krishinda Maheswari	(China) Luo Ying (China) Luo Yu	21–17, 21–17	(gold) Winner	
2015	Indonesian Masters	(Indonesia) Nitya Krishinda Maheswari	(China) Tang Yuanting (China) Yu Yang	18–21, 11–21	(silver) Runner-up	
2017	Thailand Open	(Indonesia) Apriyani Rahayu	(Thailand) Chayanit Chaladchalam (Thailand) Phataimas Muenwong	21–12, 21–12	(gold) Winner	

BWF Grand Prix Gold tournament
BWF Grand Prix tournament

== Performance timeline ==
Key

W	Won	F	Finalist	SF	Semi-finalist
QF	Quarter-finalist	#R	Rounds 4, 3, 2, 1	RR	Round-robin stage
Q#	Qualification round	A	Absent	w/d	Withdrew
G	Gold	S	Silver	B	Bronze
NH	Not held	N/A	Not applicable	DNQ	Did not qualify

=== National team ===
- Junior level

Team events	2004	2005	Ref
Asian Junior Championships	B	B	
World Junior Championships	B	NH	

- Senior level

Team events	2004	2005	2006	2007	2008	2009	2010	2011	2012	2013	2014	2015	2016	2017	2018	2019	2020	2021	Ref
SEA Games	NH	B	NH	G	NH	S	NH	A	NH			A	NH	B	NH	S	NH		
Asia Team Championships	NH												QF	NH	B	NH	QF	NH	
Asian Games	NH		R	NH			B	NH			QF	NH			B	NH			
Uber Cup	DF	NH	A	NH	S	NH	B	NH	QF	NH	QF	NH	QF	NH	QF	NH	QF	NH	
Sudirman Cup	NH	S	NH	S	NH	B	NH	B	NH	QF	NH	B	NH	RR	NH	B	NH	QF	

=== Individual competitions ===
==== Junior level ====
In the junior international tournament, Polii won bronze medals in the girls' doubles at the 2004 World, 2005 Asian Junior Championships and also a silver medal in the mixed at the 2004 World Junior Championships.

Girls' doubles

Tournament	2004	2005	Ref
Asian Junior Championships	QF	B	
World Junior Championships	B	NH	

Mixed doubles

Tournament	2004	2005	Ref
Asian Junior Championships	2R	A	
World Junior Championships	S	NH	

==== Senior level ====
In the senior level tournament, Polii won gold medals in the 2014 Asian Games, 2019 SEA Games, and at the 2020 Summer Olympics. She also won 14 individual titles in the BWF tour equivalent events.

===== Women's doubles =====
Tournament	2004	2005	2006	2007	2008	2009	2010	2011	2012	2013	2014	2015	2016	2017	2018	2019	2020	2021	2022	Ref
SEA Games	NH	S	NH	S	NH	QF	NH	A	NH	S	NH	A	NH	1R	NH	G	NH	A	NH	
Asian Championships	2R	B	A		QF	A	QF	A	1R	A		2R	B	A	QF	1R	NH		A	
Asian Games	NH		2R	NH			2R	NH			G	NH			B	NH			A	
World Championships	NH	A	3R	2R	NH	3R	A	QF	NH	A	QF	B	NH	A	B	B	NH	w/d	A	
Olympic Games	DNQ	NH			DNQ	NH			DSQ	NH			QF	NH			G	NH		

Tournament	IBF Grand Prix						BWF Superseries / Grand Prix											BWF World Tour					Best	Ref
Tournament	2001	2002	2003	2004	2005	2006	2007	2008	2009	2010	2011	2012	2013	2014	2015	2016	2017	2018	2019	2020	2021	2022	Best	Ref
India Open	NH							2R	A		SF	2R	A	1R	A	SF	A	W	W	NH		A	W ('18, '19)	
Spain Masters	NH																	A		W	A	NH	W ('20)	
German Open	A				1R	A		QF	A			2R	1R	A	2R	SF	2R	A	QF	NH		A	SF ('16)	
All England Open	A					2R	QF	QF	1R	QF	1R	2R	2R	1R	QF	1R	2R	1R	QF	1R	2R	2R	QF ('07, '08, '10, '15, '19)	
Swiss Open	A				SF	A	SF	2R	2R	A	SF	2R	A	F	A		2R	A		NH	A		F ('14)	
Korea Open	A					F	2R	1R	A		1R	QF	2R	SF	W	A	QF	w/d	2R	NH		A	W ('15)	
Thailand Open	A	NH	A	R2	A		2R	A		NH	A		W	NH	w/d	A	W	W	QF	W	NH	A	W ('13, '17, '18, '20)	
Thailand Open	A	NH	A	R2	A		2R	A		NH	A		W	NH	w/d	A	W	W	QF	SF	NH	A	W ('13, '17, '18, '20)	
Indonesia Masters	NH									F	w/d	A	QF	A	F	A	NH	F	SF	W	QF	A	W ('20)	
Indonesia Open	1R	2R	Q3	2R	1R	QF	2R	QF	2R	QF	QF	SF	QF	2R	F	2R	2R	QF	2R	NH	F	A	F ('15, '21)	
Malaysia Open	A			QF	A		F	2R	A		w/d	1R	1R	QF	QF	SF	A		2R	NH		Ret.	F ('07)	
Malaysia Masters	NH								A		SF	A			QF	A			F	SF	NH	Ret.	F ('19)	
Singapore Open	A			w/d	SF	QF	QF	2R	F	SF	QF	SF	SF	QF	W	A			NH		A	Ret.	W ('16)	
Chinese Taipei Open	NH	A		QF	A			2R	A	QF	F	A		W	W	A			SF	NH		Ret.	W ('14, '15)	
Japan Open	A				R2	R2	A	QF	SF	2R	2R	A	2R	A	QF	A	2R	SF	QF	NH		Ret.	SF ('09, '18)	
Denmark Open	A					SF	1R	SF	2R	A	1R	A	1R	A	1R	SF	1R	SF	2R	A	QF	Ret.	SF ('06, '08, '16, '18)	
French Open	A					NH	SF	2R	SF	A	1R	A	SF	A	SF	QF	W	SF	2R	NH	A	Ret.	W ('17)	
Macau Open	NH	N/A	NH			QF	A			F	QF	1R	A							NH		Ret.	F ('10)	
Hong Kong Open	A	NH	A	NH	SF	2R	2R	A		2R	A	2R	A	SF	SF	w/d	F	SF	w/d	NH		Ret.	F ('17)	
Australian Open	A						N/A		A			R2	R2	A	QF	F	A		SF	NH		Ret.	F ('16)	
China Open	A				QF	A	1R	A			1R	A	2R	QF	2R	w/d	1R	SF	QF	NH		Ret.	SF ('18)	
China Masters	NH				A		1R	1R	A	QF	A		QF	A				QF	1R	NH		Ret.	QF ('10, '13, '18)	
Thailand Masters	NH															A	SF	A			NH		SF ('17)	
New Zealand Open	NH	A								NH	N/A	NH	QF	A			SF	A		NH			SF ('17)	
Philippines Open	NH					W	SF	NH	2R	NH													W ('06)	
Dutch Open	A						QF	A												NH	N/A		QF ('07)	
Superseries / World Tour Finals	NH							SF	DNQ	RR	DNQ			w/d	SF	w/d	DNQ	RR	RR	RR	SF	Ret.	SF ('08, '15, '21)	
Year-end ranking									12	9	8	14	12	8	3	5	11	4	8	8	6	—	2	
Tournament	2001	2002	2003	2004	2005	2006	2007	2008	2009	2010	2011	2012	2013	2014	2015	2016	2017	2018	2019	2020	2021	2022	Best	Ref

===== Mixed doubles =====
Tournament	2007	2008	2009	2010	Ref
Asian Championships	A	2R	A	QF	
World Championships	3R	A			

Tournament	IBF Grand Prix						BWF Superseries / Grand Prix									Best	Ref
Tournament	2001	2002	2003	2004	2005	2006	2007	2008	2009	2010	2011	2012	2013	2014	2015	Best	Ref
Swiss Open	A						F	A								F ('07)	
German Open	A							QF	A							QF ('08)	
All England Open	A						1R	1R	A						2R	2R ('15)	
India Open	NH							QF	A							QF ('08)	
Malaysia Open	A						1R	1R	A							1R ('07, '08)	
Singapore Open	A					SF	2R	2R	A	2R	A					SF ('06)	
Korea Open	A					2R	2R	QF	A							QF ('08)	
Chinese Taipei Open	NH	A												1R	A	1R ('14)	
Japan Open	A					R2	A	QF	A							QF ('08)	
Denmark Open	A							2R	A							2R ('08)	
French Open	A					NH	A	1R	A							1R ('08)	
Macau Open	NH	N/A	NH			2R	A									2R ('06)	
China Masters	NH				A		1R	QF	A							QF ('08)	
Hong Kong Open	A	NH	A	NH	A	1R	A									1R ('06)	
Indonesia Open	Q1	1R	1R	A		2R	1R	2R	A	2R	A			2R	A	2R ('06, '08, '10, '14)	
Philippines Open	NH					SF	2R	NH	A	NH						SF ('06)	
Year-end ranking										93				183	238	82	
Tournament	2001	2002	2003	2004	2005	2006	2007	2008	2009	2010	2011	2012	2013	2014	2015	Best	Ref

== Record against selected opponents ==
Record against year-end Finals finalists, World Championships semi-finalists, and Olympic quarter-finalists.

=== Nitya Krishinda Maheswari ===
Players	M	W	L	Diff.
(China) Chen Qingchen & Jia Yifan	1	1	0	+1
(China) Cheng Shu & Zhao Yunlei	3	1	2	–1
(China) Du Jing & Yu Yang	1	0	1	–1
(China) Luo Ying & Luo Yu	6	4	2	+2
(China) Ma Jin & Wang Xiaoli	3	0	3	–3
(China) Tang Yuanting & Yu Yang	8	2	6	–4
(China) Tian Qing & Zhao Yunlei	6	2	4	–2
(China) Wang Xiaoli & Yu Yang	6	3	3	0
(China) Zhang Yawen & Zhao Tingting	2	0	2	–2
(Chinese Taipei) Cheng Wen-hsing & Chien Yu-chin	1	0	1	–1
(Denmark) Kamilla Rytter Juhl & Lena Frier Kristiansen	3	2	1	+1
(Denmark) Christinna Pedersen & Kamilla Rytter Juhl	7	5	2	+3
(India) Jwala Gutta & Ashwini Ponnappa	3	2	1	+1
(Japan) Naoko Fukuman & Kurumi Yonao	7	5	2	+3
(Japan) Reika Kakiiwa & Miyuki Maeda	5	2	3	–1
(Japan) Miyuki Maeda & Satoko Suetsuna	3	2	1	+1
(Japan) Misaki Matsutomo & Ayaka Takahashi	5	2	3	–1
(Malaysia) Vivian Hoo & Woon Khe Wei	4	2	2	0
(Malaysia) Chin Eei Hui & Wong Pei Tty	2	1	1	0
(Netherlands) Eefje Muskens & Selena Piek	1	1	0	+1
(South Korea) Chang Ye-na & Lee So-hee	4	3	1	+2
(South Korea) Jung Kyung-eun & Shin Seung-chan	4	2	2	0
(South Korea) Lee So-hee & Shin Seung-chan	2	2	0	+2
(Thailand) Puttita Supajirakul & Sapsiree Taerattanachai	3	2	1	+1

=== Meiliana Jauhari ===
Players	M	W	L	Diff.
(Australia) Leanne Choo & Renuga Veeran	1	1	0	+1
(China) Luo Ying & Luo Yu	2	0	2	–2
(China) Ma Jin & Wang Xiaoli	1	0	1	–1
(China) Tian Qing & Zhao Yunlei	2	0	2	–2
(China) Wang Xiaoli & Yu Yang	1	0	1	–1
(Chinese Taipei) Cheng Wen-hsing & Chien Yu-chin	5	1	4	–3
(Denmark) Christinna Pedersen & Kamilla Rytter Juhl	2	0	2	–2
(India) Jwala Gutta & Ashwini Ponnappa	3	3	0	+3
(Japan) Mizuki Fujii & Reika Kakiiwa	2	1	1	0
(Japan) Miyuki Maeda & Satoko Suetsuna	5	1	4	–3
(Japan) Misaki Matsutomo & Ayaka Takahashi	1	0	1	–1
(Malaysia) Vivian Hoo & Woon Khe Wei	3	1	2	–1
(Malaysia) Chin Eei Hui & Wong Pei Tty	5	5	0	+5
(Russia) Valeria Sorokina & Nina Vislova	1	1	0	+1
(South Africa) Michelle Edwards & Annari Viljoen	2	2	0	+2
(South Korea) Eom Hye-won & Chang Ye-na	1	0	1	–1
(South Korea) Ha Jung-eun & Kim Min-jung	5	1	4	–3

=== Apriyani Rahayu ===
Players	M	W	L	Diff.
(Bulgaria) Gabriela Stoeva & Stefani Stoeva	5	4	1	+3
(China) Chen Qingchen & Jia Yifan	10	4	6	–2
(China) Du Yue & Li Yinhui	7	4	3	+1
(Denmark) Maiken Fruergaard & Sara Thygesen	9	9	0	+9
(Denmark) Christinna Pedersen & Kamilla Rytter Juhl	2	1	1	0
(Japan) Yuki Fukushima & Sayaka Hirota	11	3	8	–5
(Japan) Mayu Matsumoto & Wakana Nagahara	5	1	4	–3
(Japan) Misaki Matsutomo & Ayaka Takahashi	12	2	10	–8
(Japan) Nami Matsuyama & Chiharu Shida	4	2	2	0
(Japan) Shiho Tanaka & Koharu Yonemoto	4	3	1	+2
(Malaysia) Vivian Hoo & Woon Khe Wei	1	0	1	–1
(Malaysia) Pearly Tan & Thinaah Muralitharan	5	5	0	+5
(Netherlands) Selena Piek & Cheryl Seinen	1	1	0	+1
(South Korea) Chang Ye-na & Lee So-hee	1	0	1	–1
(South Korea) Kim So-yeong & Kong Hee-yong	4	1	3	–2
(South Korea) Lee So-hee & Shin Seung-chan	8	6	2	+4
(Thailand) Puttita Supajirakul & Sapsiree Taerattanachai	4	3	1	+2
