= 2006 Korea Open =

The 2006 Korea Open in badminton was held in Seoul, from August 21 to August 27, 2006.

The prize money was US$300,000.

== Venue ==
Jangchung Gymnasium

== Results ==
=== Men's singles ===
Quarterfinals
1	(Malaysia) Roslin Hashim	21	21
8	(China) Chen Yu	8	17
4	(South Korea) Shon Seung-mo	21	21
5	(Thailand) Boonsak Ponsana	18	13
3	(South Korea) Jang Young-soo	12	17
6	(China) Bao Chunlai	21	21
2	(South Korea) Lee Hyun-il	21	21
7	(Malaysia) Sairul Amar Ayob	14	14

Semifinals
(Malaysia) Roslin Hashim	17	21	21
(South Korea) Shon Seung-mo	21	19	11
(China) Bao Chunlai	21	21
(South Korea) Lee Hyun-il	19	7

Finals
(Malaysia) Roslin Hashim	18	16
(China) Bao Chunlai	21	21

=== Women's singles ===
Semifinals
(Germany) Xu Huaiwen	18	14
(China) Lu Lan	21	21
(China) Zhu Lin	21	21
(Malaysia) Wong Mew Choo	13	16

Final
(China) Lu Lan	21	21
(China) Zhu Lin	18	11

=== Men's doubles ===
Semifinals
(China) He Hanbin (China) Shen Ye	17	11
(South Korea) Hwang Ji-man (South Korea) Lee Jae-jin	21	21
(Indonesia) Markis Kido (Indonesia) Hendra Setiawan	21	19	13
(United States) Tony Gunawan (Indonesia) Candra Wijaya	14	21	21

Final
(South Korea) Hwang Ji-man (South Korea) Lee Jae-jin	18	18
(United States) Tony Gunawan (Indonesia) Candra Wijaya	21	21

=== Women's doubles ===
Semifinals
(China) Yang Wei (China) Zhang Jiewen	21	21
(Indonesia) Lita Nurlita (Indonesia) Natalia Christine Poluakan	15	9
(Indonesia) Jo Novita (Indonesia) Greysia Polii	9
(South Korea) Lee Hyo-jung (South Korea) Lee Kyung-won	11

Final
(China) Yang Wei (China) Zhang Jiewen	21	21
(Indonesia) Jo Novita (Indonesia) Greysia Polii	10	11

=== Mixed doubles ===
Semifinals
(Indonesia) Nova Widianto (Indonesia) Liliyana Natsir	21	21
(Denmark) Thomas Laybourn (Denmark) Kamilla Rytter Juhl	14	17
(Denmark) Jens Eriksen (Denmark) Mette Schjoldager	w	/	o
(South Korea) Lee Jae-jin (South Korea) Lee Hyo-jung

Final
(Indonesia) Nova Widianto (Indonesia) Liliyana Natsir	23	21
(Denmark) Jens Eriksen (Denmark) Mette Schjoldager	21	18
