= 2007 BWF World Championships – Women's doubles =

Women's doubles at the 2007 BWF World Championships
- Venue: Putra Indoor Stadium
- Location: Kuala Lumpur, Malaysia
- Dates: August 13, 2007 – August 19, 2007

Medalists
gold medal	Yang Wei; Zhang Jiewen	China
silver medal	Gao Ling; Huang Sui	China
bronze medal	Zhang Yawen; Wei Yili	China
bronze medal	Kumiko Ogura; Reiko Shiota	Japan

This article list the results of women's doubles category in the 2007 BWF World Championships (World Badminton Championships).

== Seeds ==
1. (China) Zhang Yawen / Wei Yili (semi-finals)
2. (China) Gao Ling / Huang Sui (final)
3. (China) Yang Wei / Zhang Jiewen (world champions)
4. (China) Du Jing / Yu Yang (withdrew)
5. (England) Gail Emms / Donna Kellogg (quarter-finals)
6. (Japan) Kumiko Ogura / Reiko Shiota (semi-finals)
7. (Singapore) Jiang Yanmei / Li Yujia (quarter-finals)
8. (Malaysia) Wong Pei Tty / Chin Eei Hui (quarter-finals)

9. (South Korea) Lee Kyung-won / Lee Hyo-jung (third round)
10. (Indonesia) Endang Nursugianti / Rani Mundiasti (third round)
11. (Poland) Kamila Augustyn / Nadieżda Kostiuczyk (first round)
12. (Japan) Aki Akao / Tomomi Matsuda (third round)
13. (Japan) Miyuki Maeda / Satoko Suetsuna (third round)
14. (Germany) Nicole Grether / Juliane Schenk (third round)
15. (Denmark) Lena Frier Kristiansen / Kamilla Rytter Juhl (third round)
16. (Bulgaria) Petya Nedelcheva / Diana Dimova (second round)

Click on the seed number of a player to go to their draw section.

== Draw ==
=== Finals ===
Semi-finals
1	(China) Zhang Yawen (China) Wei Yili	21	18	16
3	(China) Yang Wei (China) Zhang Jiewen	19	21	21
6	(Japan) Kumiko Ogura (Japan) Reiko Shiota	16	25	6
2	(China) Gao Ling (China) Huang Sui	21	23	21

Final
3	(China) Yang Wei (China) Zhang Jiewen	21	21
2	(China) Gao Ling (China) Huang Sui	16	19

=== Top half ===
==== Section 1 ====
First Round
9	(South Korea) Lee K-w (South Korea) Lee H-j	21	21
(Republic of Ireland) C Magee (Republic of Ireland) H Bing	8	15
(England) J Nicholas (England) N Munt	21	14	22
(Russia) A Russkikh (Russia) E Ananina	19	21	24
14	(Germany) N Grether (Germany) J Schenk	21	21
(Philippines) P Chan (Philippines) T T Chan	5	7
(United States) E Lee (United States) M Mangkalakiri	21	21
(Canada) V Loker (Canada) S MacMaster	12	16

Second Round
1	(China) Zhang YW (China) Wai YL	21	21
(Scotland) I Bankier (Scotland) E Mason	15	13
9	(South Korea) Lee K-w (South Korea) Lee H-j	21	21
(Russia) A Russkikh (Russia) E Ananina	14	10
7	(Singapore) Jiang YM (Singapore) Li YJ	18	21	20
(Indonesia) J Novita (Indonesia) G Polii	21	16	15^{r}
14	(Germany) N Grether (Germany) J Schenk	21	21
(United States) E Lee (United States) M Mangkalakiri	5	8

Third Round
1	(China) Zhang YW (China) Wai YL	21	21
9	(South Korea) Lee K-w (South Korea) Lee H-j	14	19
7	(Singapore) Jiang YM (Singapore) Li YJ	18	21	21
14	(Germany) N Grether (Germany) J Schenk	21	10	13

Quarter-finals
1	(China) Zhang YW (China) Wai YL	21	21
7	(Singapore) Jiang YM (Singapore) Li YJ	13	7

==== Section 2 ====
First Round
12	(Japan) A Akao (Japan) T Matsuda	21	21
(Switzerland) S Jaquet (Switzerland) C Jörg	18	18
(Slovenia) M Kersnik (Slovenia) M Tvrdy	11	9
(England) S Rayappan (England) J Wallwork	21	21
13	(Japan) M Maeda (Japan) S Suetsuna	21	21
(France) É Eymard (France) W Rahmawati	14	17
(Sweden) J Persson (Sweden) E Bergblom	20	21	21
(India) S Kurien (India) J Gutta	22	15	18

Second Round
3	(China) Yang W (China) Zhang JW	21	21
(Romania) A Milon (Romania) F Petra	10	4
12	(Japan) A Akao (Japan) T Matsuda	21	9	21
(England) S Rayappan (England) J Wallwork	14	21	12
8	(Malaysia) Wong P T (Malaysia) Chin E H	21	21
(Bulgaria) M Dobreva (Bulgaria) A Spasova	9	7
13	(Japan) M Maeda (Japan) S Suetsuna	21	21
(Sweden) J Persson (Sweden) E Bergblom	13	16

Third Round
3	(China) Yang W (China) Zhang JW	21	21
12	(Japan) A Akao (Japan) T Matsuda	14	17
8	(Malaysia) Wong P T (Malaysia) Chin E H	21	14	21
13	(Japan) M Maeda (Japan) S Suetsuna	15	21	14

Quarter-finals
3	(China) Yang W (China) Zhang JW	22	21
8	(Malaysia) Wong P T (Malaysia) Chin E H	20	12

=== Bottom half ===
==== Section 3 ====
First Round
(Sri Lanka) T Jayasinghe (Sri Lanka) N Gayanthi	9	9
(Germany) C Mette (Germany) B Overzier	21	21
(Peru) V Rivero (Peru) J Meng	16	8
10	(Indonesia) E Nursugianti (Indonesia) R Mundiasti	21	21
(Chinese Taipei) Chou C-c (Chinese Taipei) Ku P-t	19	21	21
(Netherlands) R van Cutsen (Netherlands) P van Dooremalen	21	14	7
(Canada) F McKee (Canada) C Reid	16	16
16	(Bulgaria) P Nedelcheva (Bulgaria) D Dimova	21	21

Second Round
(Germany) C Mette (Germany) B Overzier	15	21	15
10	(Indonesia) E Nursugianti (Indonesia) R Mundiasti	21	14	21
(Malaysia) Fong C Y (Malaysia) Mooi H Y	21	13	11
6	(Japan) K Ogura (Japan) R Shiota	15	21	21
(Chinese Taipei) Chou C-c (Chinese Taipei) Ku P-t	21	21
16	(Bulgaria) P Nedelcheva (Bulgaria) D Dimova	6	14
(France) L Choinet (France) E Chanteur	w	/	o
4	(China) Yu Y (China) Du J

Third Round
10	(Indonesia) E Nursugianti (Indonesia) R Mundiasti	16	10
6	(Japan) K Ogura (Japan) R Shiota	21	21
(Chinese Taipei) Chou C-c (Chinese Taipei) Ku P-t	21	21
(France) L Choinet (France) E Chanteur	8	15

Quarter-finals
6	(Japan) K Ogura (Japan) R Shiota	21	21
(Chinese Taipei) Chou C-c (Chinese Taipei) Ku P-t	19	15

==== Section 4 ====
First Round
(Egypt) A Youssef (Egypt) H Hosny	9	12
(New Zealand) R Flavell (New Zealand) D Cranston	21	21
(South Korea) Ha J-e (South Korea) Hwang Y-m	22	21
11	(Poland) K Augustyn (Poland) N Kostiuczyk	20	11
(United States) Chen K-y (United States) J Subandhi	16	21	10
(Malaysia) Lim P S (Malaysia) J Quay	21	19	21
(Russia) N Vislova (Russia) V Sorokina	14	7
15	(Denmark) L Frier Kristiansen (Denmark) K R Juhl	21	21

Second Round
(New Zealand) R Flavell (New Zealand) D Cranston	10	7
(South Korea) Ha J-e (South Korea) Hwang Y-m	21	21
(Finland) A Nieminen (Finland) N Weckström	7	6
5	(England) G Emms (England) D Kellogg	21	21
(Malaysia) Lim P S (Malaysia) J Quay	21	13	17
15	(Denmark) L Frier Kristiansen (Denmark) K R Juhl	10	21	21
(Singapore) V Neo (Singapore) S M Sari	9	17
2	(China) Gao L (China) Huang S	21	21

Third Round
(South Korea) Ha J-e (South Korea) Hwang Y-m	17	15
5	(England) G Emms (England) D Kellogg	21	21
(Denmark) L Frier Kristiansen (Denmark) K R Juhl	5	15
2	(China) Gao L (China) Huang S	21	21

Quarter-finals
(England) G Emms (England) D Kellogg	15	21	17
2	(China) Gao L (China) Huang S	21	12	21

== Source ==
- Tournamentsoftware.com: 2007 World Championships - Women's doubles
