= List of Denmark Open men's doubles champions =

Below is the list of the winners at the Denmark Open in badminton in men's doubles.

Year	Champion	Runner-up	Score
1935-1936	(Denmark) Aksel Hansen/Svenn Strømann		
1936-1937	(England) T. H. Boyle/ K. Woods		
1937-1938	(Denmark) Carl Frøhlke/ Tage Madsen		
1938-1939	(England) Ralph Nichols/ R. M. White,		
1939; 1944	No competition		
1945-1946	(Denmark) Preben Dabelsteen/ Jørn Skaarup		
1946-1947	(Denmark) Preben Dabelsteen/ Jørn Skaarup		
1947-1948	(Denmark) Børge Frederiksen/ Tage Madsen		
1948-1949	(Federation of Malaya) Ooi Teik Hock/ Teoh Seng Khoon		
1949-1950	(Denmark) Arve Lossmann/ John Nygaard		
1950-1951	(Federation of Malaya) Ong Poh Lim/ Ismail Bin Marjan		
1951-1952	(Federation of Malaya) Ong Poh Lim/ Ismail Bin Marjan		
1952-1953	(Federation of Malaya) David E. L. Choong/ Eddie Choong		
1953-1954	No competition		
1954-1955	(Denmark) Jorgen Hammergaard Hansen/Finn Kobberø		
1955; 1964	No competition		
1965-1966	(Malaysia) Ng Boon Bee/ Tan Yee Khan		
1966-1967	(Malaysia) Ng Boon Bee/ Tan Yee Khan		
1967-1968	(Japan) Ippei Kojima/ Kazumasa Nichino		
1968-1969	(Japan) Ippei Kojima/ (Denmark) Bjarne Andersen		
1969-1970	(Denmark) Henning Borch/Erland Kops		
1970-1971	(Malaysia) Ng Boon Bee/Punch Gunalan		
1971-1972	(Malaysia) Ng Boon Bee/P. Gunalan		
1972-1973	(Indonesia) Tjun Tjun/Johan Wahjudi		
1974-1975	(Indonesia) Tjun Tjun/Johan Wahjudi		
1975-1976	(England) David Eddy/Eddie Sutton		
1976-1977	(Sweden) Bengt Froman/Thomas Kihlström		
1977-1978	(Denmark) Flemming Delfs/Steen Skovgaard		
1978-1979	(Japan) Masao Tsuchida/Yoshitaka Iino		
1979-1980	(Denmark) Flemming Delfs/Steen Skovgaard		
1980-1981	(Indonesia) Ade Chandra/Christian Hadinata		
1981-1982	(South Korea) Park Joo-bong/Lee Eun-ku		
1982-1983	(Sweden) Thomas Kihlström/Stefan Karlsson		
1983-1984	(South Korea) Park Joo-bong/Kim Moon-soo		
1984-1985	(China) Li Yongbo/Tian Bingyi		
1985-1986	(Denmark) Steen Fladberg/Jesper Helledie		
1986-1987	(China) Li Yongbo/Tian Bingyi		
1987-1988	(Malaysia) Razif Sidek/Jalani Sidek		
1988-1989	(China) Li Yongbo/Tian Bingyi		
1989-1990	(China) Li Yongbo/Tian Bingyi		
1990-1991	(China) Li Yongbo/Tian Bingyi		
1991-1992	(China) Yumin Zheng/Zhanzhong Huang		
1992-1993	(Denmark) Thomas Lund/Jon Holst-Christensen		
1993-1994	(Denmark) Thomas Lund/Jon Holst-Christensen		
1994-1995	(Indonesia) Denny Kantono/S. Antonius		
1995-1996	(Denmark) Thomas Lund/Jon Holst-Christensen		
1996-1997	(Denmark) Thomas Stavngaard/ Jim Laugesen		
1997-1998	(Denmark) Jon Holst-Christensen/Michael Søgaard		
1998-1999	(Indonesia) Ricky Subagja/Rexy Mainaky		
1999-2000	(Denmark) Martin Lundgaard Hansen/ Lars Paaske		
2000-2001	(Indonesia) Eng Hian/Flandy Limpele		
2001-2002	(Denmark) Martin Lundgaard Hansen/ Lars Paaske		
2002-2003	(South Korea) Kim Dong-moon/ Ha Tae-kwon		
2003-2004	(South Korea) Kim Dong-moon/ Ha Tae-kwon		
2004-2005	(Denmark) Lars Paaske/ Jonas Rasmussen		
2005-2006	(Malaysia) Chan Chong Ming/ Koo Kien Keat	(Denmark) Lars Paaske/ Jonas Rasmussen	15-6, 15-7
2006-2007	(Denmark) Lars Paaske/ Jonas Rasmussen	(Denmark) Mathias Boe/ Joachim Fischer	18-21, 21-10, 21-17
2007-2008	(Denmark) Koo Kien Keat/ Tan Boon Heong	(Denmark) Jens Eriksen/ Martin Lundgaard Hansen	14-21, 21-14, 21-12
2008	(Indonesia) Markis Kido/ Hendra Setiawan	(China) Fu Haifeng/ Shen Ye	21-18, 21-19
2009	(Malaysia) Koo Kien Keat/ Tan Boon Heong	(Denmark) Mathias Boe/ Carsten Mogensen	20-22, 21-14, 21-17
