= Kumiko Ogura =

Japanese badminton player

Personal information
- Born: 5 July 1983 (age 43) Kawagoe, Mie, Japan
- Height: 1.70 m (5 ft 7 in)
- Weight: 64 kg (141 lb)

Sport
- Country: Japan
- Sport: Badminton
- Handedness: Right

Women's doubles
- Highest ranking: 6
- BWF profile
Medal record
Women's badminton
Representing Japan
World Championships
Bronze medal – third place	2007 Kuala Lumpur	Women's doubles
Uber Cup
Bronze medal – third place	2004 Jakarta	Women's team
Asian Games
Silver medal – second place	2006 Doha	Women's team
Bronze medal – third place	2006 Doha	Women's doubles
Asian Championships
Silver medal – second place	2005 Hyderabad	Women's doubles
Bronze medal – third place	2007 Johor Bahru	Women's doubles
Asian Junior Championships
Bronze medal – third place	2000 Kyoto	Girls' team

Kumiko Ogura (小椋 久美子, Ogura Kumiko; born 5 July 1983) is a Japanese badminton player, affiliated with the Sanyo Electric team.

Born in Kawagoe, Mie, Ogura started playing badminton at the age of eight. During her first year at Shitennoji Senior High School, she joined the Japanese junior team. After graduating from high school in 2002, she joined the Sanyo Electric team.

Partnered with Reiko Shiota, Ogura finished second in the women's doubles at the 2005 Asian Championships. The pair then won their first World Grand Prix title at the 2005 Denmark Open. In 2006, they won a bronze medal at the Doha 2006 Asian Games after losing to Yang Wei and Zhang Jiewen in the semifinals. They also won bronze at the 2007 World Championships in Kuala Lumpur, Malaysia. In May 2008, Ogura and Shiota were ranked 6th in the BWF World Ranking and qualified for the Beijing 2008 Summer Olympics. At the Olympics, they won their first round match against the Danish pair of Lena Frier Kristiansen and Kamilla Rytter Juhl in a rubber match, but lost in straight games to Du Jing and Yu Yang of China in the second round.

In March 2010, she retired from the Sanyo team and joined Kay Enterprises as a coach.

In March 2011, she married Japanese rugby union player Daisuke Yamamoto, but in September 2012, she filed for divorce.

== Achievements ==
=== BWF World Championships ===
Women's doubles
Year	Venue	Partner	Opponent	Score	Result
2007	Putra Indoor Stadium; Kuala Lumpur, Malaysia	(Japan) Reiko Shiota	(China) Gao Ling (China) Huang Sui	16–21, 25–23, 6–21	Bronze

=== Asian Games ===
Women's doubles
Year	Venue	Partner	Opponent	Score	Result
2006	Aspire Hall 3 Doha, Qatar	(Japan) Reiko Shiota	(China) Yang Wei (China) Zhang Jiewen	22–20, 16–21, 9–21	Bronze

=== Asian Championships ===
Women's doubles
Year	Venue	Partner	Opponent	Score	Result
2005	Gachibowli Indoor Stadium; Hyderabad, India	(Japan) Reiko Shiota	(South Korea) Lee Hyo-jung (South Korea) Lee Kyung-won	13–15, 15–8, 5–15	Silver
2007	Bandaraya Stadium; Johor Bahru, Malaysia	(Japan) Reiko Shiota	(China) Yang Wei (China) Zhao Tingting	15–21, 9–21	Bronze

=== IBF Grand Prix ===
The World Badminton Grand Prix has been sanctioned by the International Badminton Federation from 1983 to 2006.

Women's doubles
Year	Tournament	Partner	Opponent	Score	Result
2005	Denmark Open	(Japan) Reiko Shiota	(England) Gail Emms (England) Donna Kellogg	15–6, 15–9	(gold) Winner

=== BWF International Challenge/Series/Satellite ===
Women's doubles
Year	Tournament	Partner	Opponent	Score	Result	Ref.
2003	Scottish International	(Japan) Reiko Shiota	(Germany) Nicole Grether (Germany) Juliane Schenk	8–15, 15–11, 15–12	(gold) Winner	
2003	Smiling Fish Satellite	(Japan) Reiko Shiota	(Thailand) Duanganong Aroonkesorn (Thailand) Salakjit Ponsana	10–15, 15–11, 7–15	(silver) Runner-up	
2007	Osaka International	(Japan) Reiko Shiota	(Japan) Aki Akao (Japan) Tomomi Matsuda	21–12, 21–23, 14–21	(silver) Runner-up	
2008	Osaka International	(Japan) Reiko Shiota	(South Korea) Ha Jung-eun (South Korea) Kim Min-jung	20–22, 21–8, 21–13	(gold) Winner	

BWF International Challenge tournament
BWF International Series tournament
