= Reiko Shiota =

Japanese badminton player

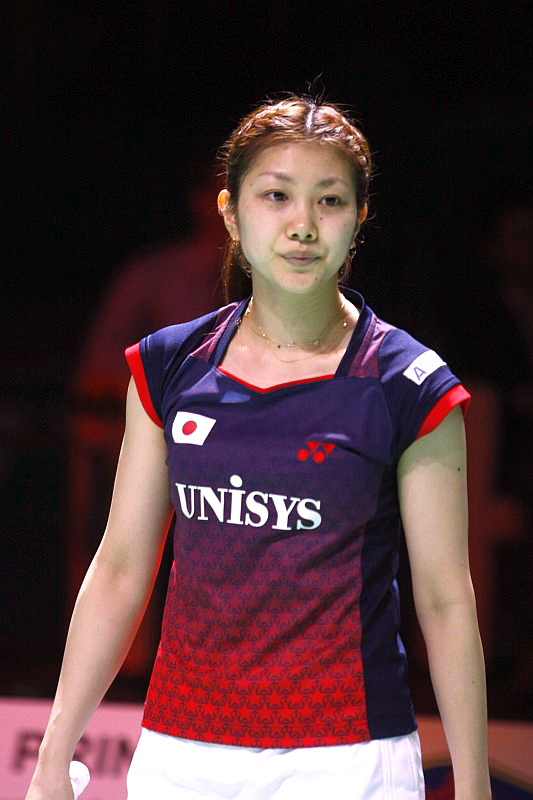

Personal information
- Born: 30 September 1983 (age 43) Kanda, Fukuoka, Japan
- Height: 1.67 m (5 ft 6 in)
- Weight: 57 kg (126 lb)

Sport
- Country: Japan
- Sport: Badminton
- Handedness: Right

Women's & mixed doubles
- Highest ranking: 6 (WD with Kumiko Ogura, 17 January 2006); 8 (XD with Shintaro Ikeda, 2 October 2012)
- BWF profile
Medal record
Women's badminton
Representing Japan
World Championships
Bronze medal – third place	2007 Kuala Lumpur	Women's doubles
Asian Games
Silver medal – second place	2006 Doha	Women's team
Bronze medal – third place	2006 Doha	Women's doubles
Asian Championships
Silver medal – second place	2005 Hyderabad	Women's doubles
Bronze medal – third place	2007 Johor Bahru	Women's doubles
Asian Junior Championships
Bronze medal – third place	2000 Kyoto	Girls' team

Reiko Shiota (潮田 玲子, Shiota Reiko; born 30 September 1983) is a Japanese badminton player, affiliated with the Sanyo electric team. Shiota was the bronze medallist at the 2007 World Championships in the women's doubles event partnered with Kumiko Ogura. She also won the silver and bronze medals at the 2006 Asian Games in the women's team and doubles respectively. Shiota competed at the Olympic Games two times, in 2008 Beijing in the women's doubles event with Ogura, and in 2012 London in the mixed doubles event partnered with Shintaro Ikeda.

== Career ==
Shiota was born in Kanda, Fukuoka, and after graduating from the Kyushu International University High School in 2002, she joined the Sanyo Electric team. Partnered with Kumiko Ogura, they were popularly known as "Ogushio" and became the women's doubles runner-up at the 2005 Asian Championships. She and Ogura won their first world grand prix title at the 2005 Denmark Open. In 2006, they won the women's doubles bronze medal at the Doha 2006 Asian Games, after being defeated by Yang Wei and Zhang Jiewen in the semi-finals. Shiota also helped the Japanese women's team win the silver medal in the women's team event.

Shiota won the women's doubles bronze medal in the 2007 World Championships in Kuala Lumpur, Malaysia. Ogushio were defeated in the semifinals by Gao Ling and Huang Sui of China, 16–21, 25–23, 6–21. In May 2008, she and Ogura ranked 6 in BWF World Ranking, and qualified to compete at the Beijing 2008 Summer Olympics. In the first round they beat the Danish pair Lena Frier Kristiansen and Kamilla Rytter Juhl in the rubber games, but were defeated by Du Jing and Yu Yang of China in the second round in straight games.

In 2009, she started to team up with Shintaro Ikeda from Unisys, and in May 2010, Shiota also joined the Unisys team. In November 2010, she served as the flag bearer for the Japanese delegation at the Asian Games in Guangzhou. Shiota and Ikeda popularly known as "Ikeshio", reached the final round at the 2010 Dutch Open, 2011 German and Russian Open, and also in the BWF Superseries tournament at the 2012 Singapore Open, but they only finished as the runner-up. The Ikeshio-combi participated in the 2012 Olympic Games in London, but the duo did not advance to the knock-out stage, after placing third in the group stage. In the competition, they won a match against the Canadian pair Toby Ng and Grace Gao in the rubber game with the score 21–10, 11–21, 21–15, and lost in straight games to Joachim Fischer Nielsen and Christinna Pedersen of Denmark, and Robert Mateusiak and Nadieżda Kostiuczyk of Poland in group B stage.

== Personal life ==
On September 30, 2012 she married the footballer Tatsuya Masushima.

== Achievements ==
=== BWF World Championships ===
Women's doubles
Year	Venue	Partner	Opponent	Score	Result
2007	Putra Indoor Stadium; Kuala Lumpur, Malaysia	(Japan) Kumiko Ogura	(China) Gao Ling (China) Huang Sui	16–21, 25–23, 6–21	Bronze

=== Asian Games ===
Women's doubles
Year	Venue	Partner	Opponent	Score	Result
2006	Aspire Hall 3 Doha, Qatar	(Japan) Kumiko Ogura	(China) Yang Wei (China) Zhang Jiewen	22–20, 16–21, 9–21	Bronze

=== Asian Championships ===
Women's doubles
Year	Venue	Partner	Opponent	Score	Result
2005	Gachibowli Indoor Stadium; Hyderabad, India	(Japan) Kumiko Ogura	(South Korea) Lee Hyo-jung (South Korea) Lee Kyung-won	13–15, 15–8, 5–15	Silver
2007	Bandaraya Stadium; Johor Bahru, Malaysia	(Japan) Kumiko Ogura	(China) Yang Wei (China) Zhao Tingting	15–21, 9–21	Bronze

=== BWF Superseries ===
The BWF Superseries, launched on 14 December 2006 and implemented in 2007, is a series of elite badminton tournaments, sanctioned by Badminton World Federation (BWF). BWF Superseries has two level such as Superseries and Superseries Premier. A season of Superseries features twelve tournaments around the world, which introduced since 2011, with successful players invited to the Superseries Finals held at the year end.

Mixed doubles
Year	Tournament	Partner	Opponent	Score	Result
2012	Singapore Open	(Japan) Shintaro Ikeda	(Chinese Taipei) Chen Hung-ling (Chinese Taipei) Cheng Wen-hsing	17–21, 11–21	(silver) Runner-up

BWF Super Series tournament

=== BWF Grand Prix ===
The BWF Grand Prix has two levels, the Grand Prix and Grand Prix Gold. It is a series of badminton tournaments, sanctioned by the Badminton World Federation (BWF) since 2007. The World Badminton Grand Prix sanctioned by International Badminton Federation since 1983.

Women's doubles
Year	Tournament	Partner	Opponent	Score	Result
2005	Denmark Open	(Japan) Kumiko Ogura	(England) Gail Emms (England) Donna Kellogg	15–6, 15–9	(gold) Winner

Mixed doubles
Year	Tournament	Partner	Opponent	Score	Result	Ref.
2010	Dutch Open	(Japan) Shintaro Ikeda	(Russia) Alexandr Nikolaenko (Russia) Valeri Sorokina	20–22, 9–21	(silver) Runner-up	
2011	German Open	(Japan) Shintaro Ikeda	(Scotland) Robert Blair (England) Gabrielle White	21–16, 16–21, 15–21	(silver) Runner-up	
2011	Russian Open	(Japan) Shintaro Ikeda	(Russia) Alexandr Nikolaenko (Russia) Valeri Sorokina	18–21, 14–21	(silver) Runner-up	

BWF Grand Prix Gold tournament
BWF Grand Prix tournament

=== BWF International Challenge/Series/Satellite ===
Women's doubles
Year	Tournament	Partner	Opponent	Score	Result	Ref.
2003	Scottish International	(Japan) Kumiko Ogura	(Germany) Nicole Grether (Germany) Juliane Schenk	8–15, 15–11, 15–12	(gold) Winner	
2003	Smiling Fish Satellite	(Japan) Kumiko Ogura	(Thailand) Duanganong Aroonkesorn (Thailand) Salakjit Ponsana	10–15, 15–11, 7–15	(silver) Runner-up	
2007	Osaka International	(Japan) Kumiko Ogura	(Japan) Aki Akao (Japan) Tomomi Matsuda	21–12, 21–23, 14–21	(silver) Runner-up	
2008	Osaka International	(Japan) Kumiko Ogura	(South Korea) Ha Jung-eun (South Korea) Kim Min-jung	20–22, 21–8, 21–13	(gold) Winner	

BWF International Challenge tournament
BWF International Series tournament

== Record against selected opponents ==
Mixed doubles results with Shintaro Ikeda against Super Series finalists, Worlds Semi-finalists, and Olympic quarterfinalists:

- (China) Zhang Nan & Zhao Yunlei 0–1
- (China) He Hanbin & Yu Yang
- (China) Tao Jiaming & Tian Qing 0–3
- (Chinese Taipei) Chen Hung-ling & Cheng Wen-hsing 0–3
- (England) Chris Adcock & (Scotland) Imogen Bankier 0–2
- (England) Anthony Clark & Donna Kellogg 0–2
- (Indonesia) Tontowi Ahmad & Liliyana Natsir 0–2
- (Indonesia) Nova Widianto & Liliyana Natsir 0–2
- (South Korea) Lee Yong-dae & Ha Jung-eun 0–2
- (Poland) Robert Mateusiak & Nadieżda Zięba 2–0
- (Thailand) Songphon Anugritayawon & Kunchala Voravichitchaikul 1–2
- (Thailand) Sudket Prapakamol & Saralee Thungthongkam 1–1
