= 2005 Asian Badminton Championships =

Badminton championships

Tournament details
- Country: India
- City: Hyderabad
- Venue: Gachibowli Indoor Stadium
- Dates: 6–11 September 2005

The 2005 Asian Badminton Championships was the 24th edition of the Asian Badminton Championships. It was held in Hyderabad, India from 6–11 September 2005 as a four-star tournament.

== Medalists ==
Event	Gold	Silver	Bronze
Men's singles	(Indonesia) Sony Dwi Kuncoro	(Malaysia) Kuan Beng Hong	(Hong Kong) Ng Wei
Men's singles	(Indonesia) Sony Dwi Kuncoro	(Malaysia) Kuan Beng Hong	(South Korea) Lee Hyun-il
Women's singles	(Hong Kong) Wang Chen	(Japan) Kaori Mori	(Chinese Taipei) Cheng Shao-chieh
Women's singles	(Hong Kong) Wang Chen	(Japan) Kaori Mori	(Japan) Eriko Hirose
Men's doubles	(Indonesia) Markis Kido and Hendra Setiawan	(South Korea) Lee Jae-jin and Jung Jae-sung	(Malaysia) Tan Bin Shen and Ong Soon Hock
Men's doubles	(Indonesia) Markis Kido and Hendra Setiawan	(South Korea) Lee Jae-jin and Jung Jae-sung	(Indonesia) Hendra Aprida Gunawan and Joko Riyadi
Women's doubles	(South Korea) Lee Hyo-jung and Lee Kyung-won	(Japan) Kumiko Ogura and Reiko Shiota	(Indonesia) Lita Nurlita and Natalia Poluakan
Women's doubles	(South Korea) Lee Hyo-jung and Lee Kyung-won	(Japan) Kumiko Ogura and Reiko Shiota	(Indonesia) Jo Novita and Greysia Polii
Mixed doubles	(Thailand) Sudket Prapakamol and Saralee Thungthongkam	(South Korea) Lee Jae-jin and Lee Hyo-jung	(Hong Kong) Albertus Susanto Njoto and Li Wing Mui
Mixed doubles	(Thailand) Sudket Prapakamol and Saralee Thungthongkam	(South Korea) Lee Jae-jin and Lee Hyo-jung	(Indonesia) Muhammad Rijal and Endang Nursugianti

== Medal table ==
Rank	Nation	Gold	Silver	Bronze	Total
1	Indonesia (INA)	2	0	4	6
2	South Korea (KOR)	1	2	1	4
3	Hong Kong (HKG)	1	0	2	3
4	Thailand (THA)	1	0	0	1
5	Japan (JPN)	0	2	1	3
6	Malaysia (MAS)	0	1	1	2
7	Chinese Taipei (TPE)	0	0	1	1
Totals (7 entries)		5	5	10	20

== Results ==
=== Finals ===
Category	Winners	Runners-up	Score
Men's singles	(Indonesia) Sony Dwi Kuncoro	(Malaysia) Kuan Beng Hong	15-10, 15-5
Women's singles	(Hong Kong) Wang Chen	(Japan) Kaori Mori	11-8, 11-4
Men's doubles	(Indonesia) Markis Kido (Indonesia) Hendra Setiawan	(South Korea) Lee Jae-jin (South Korea) Jung Jae-sung	15-11, 15-7
Women's doubles	(South Korea) Lee Hyo-jung (South Korea) Lee Kyung-won	(Japan) Kumiko Ogura (Japan) Reiko Shiota	15-13, 8–15, 15-5
Mixed doubles	(Thailand) Sudket Prapakamol (Thailand) Saralee Thungthongkam	(South Korea) Lee Jae-jin (South Korea) Lee Hyo-jung	15-11, 14–17, 15-10

=== Semi-finals ===
Category	Winner	Runner-up	Score
Men's singles	(Indonesia) Sony Dwi Kuncoro	(Hong Kong) Ng Wei	15–3, 15–11
Men's singles	(Malaysia) Kuan Beng Hong	(South Korea) Lee Hyun-il	15–11, 15–4
Women's singles	(Hong Kong) Wang Chen	(Chinese Taipei) Cheng Shao-chieh	11–8, 11–2
Women's singles	(Japan) Kaori Mori	(Japan) Eriko Hirose	11–5, 5–11, 13–10
Men's doubles	(South Korea) Jung Jae-sung (South Korea) Lee Jae-jin	(Indonesia) Hendra Aprida Gunawan (Indonesia) Joko Riyadi	8–15, 15–8, 15–6
Men's doubles	(Indonesia) Hendra Setiawan (Indonesia) Markis Kido	(Malaysia) Ong Soon Hock (Malaysia) Tan Bin Shen	15–13, 15–13
Women's doubles	(South Korea) Lee Kyung-won (South Korea) Lee Hyo-jung	(Indonesia) Lita Nurlita (Indonesia) Natalia Poluakan	15–5, 15–12
Women's doubles	(Japan) Kumiko Ogura (Japan) Reiko Shiota	(Indonesia) Greysia Polii (Indonesia) Jo Novita	15–10, 15–4
Mixed doubles	(South Korea) Lee Jae-jin (South Korea) Lee Hyo-jung	(Indonesia) Muhammad Rijal (Indonesia) Endang Nursugianti	15–8, 15–2
Mixed doubles	(Thailand) Sudket Prapakamol (Thailand) Saralee Thungthongkam	(Hong Kong) Albertus Susanto Njoto (Hong Kong) Li Wing Mui	15–4, 15–8
