= Badminton at the 2006 Asian Games – Women's doubles =

Women's doubles at the 2006 Asian Games
- Venue: Aspire Hall 3
- Dates: 5–9 December
- Competitors: 40 from 11 nations

Medalists
| gold medal | Gao Ling; Huang Sui | China |
| silver medal | Zhang Jiewen; Yang Wei | China |
| bronze medal | Lee Kyung-won; Lee Hyo-jung | South Korea |
| bronze medal | Kumiko Ogura; Reiko Shiota | Japan |

The badminton women's doubles tournament at the 2006 Asian Games in Doha took place from 5 December to 9 December at Aspire Hall 3.

== Schedule ==
All times are Arabia Standard Time (UTC+03:00)

| Date | Time | Event |
|---|---|---|
| Tuesday, 5 December 2006 | 13:00 | Round of 32 |
| Wednesday, 6 December 2006 | 16:00 | Round of 32 |
| Thursday, 7 December 2006 | 09:00 | Round of 16 |
| Thursday, 7 December 2006 | 22:00 | Quarterfinals |
| Friday, 8 December 2006 | 18:00 | Semifinals |
| Saturday, 9 December 2006 | 18:00 | Final |

== Results ==
Legend

- r — Retired

=== Final ===
| Final |
| 1 | Gao Ling (CHN); Huang Sui (CHN) | 18 | 23 | 21 |
| 2 | Zhang Jiewen (CHN); Yang Wei (CHN) | 21 | 21 | 14 |

=== Top half ===
Round of 32
Chou Chia-chi (TPE); Ku Pei-ting (TPE) | 18 | 12
Satoko Suetsuna (JPN); Miyuki Maeda (JPN) | 21 | 21
Koon Wai Chee (HKG); Wong Man Ching (HKG) | 21 | 21
Nadeesha Gayanthi (SRI); Thilini Jayasinghe (SRI) | 7 | 18

Round of 16
1 | Gao Ling (CHN); Huang Sui (CHN) | 21 | 21
Joanne Quay (MAS); Lim Pek Siah (MAS) | 8 | 11
6 | Pia Zebadiah Bernadet (INA); Greysia Polii (INA) | 19 | 21 | 13
Satoko Suetsuna (JPN); Miyuki Maeda (JPN) | 21 | 12 | 21
3 | Lee Kyung-won (KOR); Lee Hyo-jung (KOR) | 23 | 21
Kunchala Voravichitchaikul (THA); Duanganong Aroonkesorn (THA) | 21 | 18
8 | Jiang Yanmei (SIN); Li Yujia (SIN) | 17 | 21 | 21
Koon Wai Chee (HKG); Wong Man Ching (HKG) | 21 | 7 | 18

Quarterfinals
1 | Gao Ling (CHN); Huang Sui (CHN) | 21 | 21
Satoko Suetsuna (JPN); Miyuki Maeda (JPN) | 6 | 13
3 | Lee Kyung-won (KOR); Lee Hyo-jung (KOR) | 21 | 21
8 | Jiang Yanmei (SIN); Li Yujia (SIN) | 17 | 11

Semifinals
1 | Gao Ling (CHN); Huang Sui (CHN) | 21 | 21
3 | Lee Kyung-won (KOR); Lee Hyo-jung (KOR) | 16 | 12

=== Bottom half ===
Round of 32
Yip Pui Yin (HKG); Chau Hoi Wah (HKG) | 11 | 12
Hwang Yu-mi (KOR); Ha Jung-eun (KOR) | 21 | 21
Lita Nurlita (INA); Vita Marissa (INA) | 21 | 21
Shinta Mulia Sari (SIN); Vanessa Neo (SIN) | 12 | 6

Round of 16
Hwang Yu-mi (KOR); Ha Jung-eun (KOR) | 12 | 22 | 12
7 | Wong Pei Tty (MAS); Chin Eei Hui (MAS) | 21 | 20 | 21
Kumiko Ogura (JPN); Reiko Shiota (JPN) | 21 | 21
4 | Chien Yu-chin (TPE); Cheng Wen-hsing (TPE) | 17 | 19
Lita Nurlita (INA); Vita Marissa (INA) | 22 | 21
5 | Saralee Thungthongkam (THA); Sathinee Chankrachangwong (THA) | 20 | 12
Behnaz Pirzamanbin (IRI); Nakisa Soltani (IRI) | 2 | r
2 | Zhang Jiewen (CHN); Yang Wei (CHN) | 21

Quarterfinals
7 | Wong Pei Tty (MAS); Chin Eei Hui (MAS) | 14 | 12
Kumiko Ogura (JPN); Reiko Shiota (JPN) | 21 | 21
Lita Nurlita (INA); Vita Marissa (INA) | 5 | 23 | 17
2 | Zhang Jiewen (CHN); Yang Wei (CHN) | 21 | 21 | 21

Semifinals
Kumiko Ogura (JPN); Reiko Shiota (JPN) | 22 | 16 | 9
2 | Zhang Jiewen (CHN); Yang Wei (CHN) | 20 | 21 | 21
