= 2007 Badminton Asia Championships =

Tournament details
- Dates: 10–15 April 2007
- Venue: Bandaraya Stadium
- Location: Johor Bahru, Malaysia

Champions
- Men's singles: (Indonesia) Taufik Hidayat
- Women's singles: (China) Jiang Yanjiao
- Men's doubles: (Malaysia) Choong Tan Fook (Malaysia) Lee Wan Wah
- Women's doubles: (China) Yang Wei (China) Zhao Tingting
- Mixed doubles: (China) He Hanbin (China) Yu Yang

The 2007 Badminton Asia Championships is the 26th tournament of the Badminton Asia Championships. It was held in Johor Bahru, Malaysia from April 10 to April 15, 2007 with the total prize money of US$125,000.

== Venue ==
- Stadium Bandaraya Johor Bahru

== Medalists ==
Event	Gold	Silver	Bronze
Men's singles	(Indonesia) Taufik Hidayat	(China) Chen Hong	(India) Anup Sridhar
Men's singles	(Indonesia) Taufik Hidayat	(China) Chen Hong	(Malaysia) Yeoh Kay Bin
Women's singles	(China) Jiang Yanjiao	(China) Lu Lan	(Hong Kong) Wang Chen
Women's singles	(China) Jiang Yanjiao	(China) Lu Lan	(Malaysia) Wong Mew Choo
Men's doubles	(Malaysia) Choong Tan Fook and Lee Wan Wah	(Malaysia) Koo Kien Keat and Tan Boon Heong	(Malaysia) Mohd Zakry Abdul Latif and Mohd Fairuzizuan Mohd Tazari
Men's doubles	(Malaysia) Choong Tan Fook and Lee Wan Wah	(Malaysia) Koo Kien Keat and Tan Boon Heong	(Chinese Taipei) Tsai Chia-Hsin and Hu Chung Hsien
Women's doubles	(China) Yang Wei and Zhao Tingting	(China) Cheng Shu and Zhao Yunlei	(Thailand) Duanganong Aroonkesorn and Kunchala Voravichitchaikul
Women's doubles	(China) Yang Wei and Zhao Tingting	(China) Cheng Shu and Zhao Yunlei	(Japan) Kumiko Ogura and Reiko Shiota
Mixed doubles	(China) He Hanbin and Yu Yang	(China) Xu Chen and Zhao Tingting	(Malaysia) Mohd Fairuzizuan Mohd Tazari and Wong Pei Tty
Mixed doubles	(China) He Hanbin and Yu Yang	(China) Xu Chen and Zhao Tingting	(Indonesia) Devin Lahardi and Lita Nurlita

== Medal count ==
Pos	Country	Gold	Silver	Bronze	Total
1	China	3	4	0	7
2	Malaysia	1	1	3	5
3	Indonesia	1	0	1	2
4	India	0	0	1	1
4	Hong Kong	0	0	1	1
4	Chinese Taipei	0	0	1	1
4	Thailand	0	0	1	1
4	Japan	0	0	1	1

== Final results ==
=== Men's singles ===
Semi-finals
(Indonesia) Taufik Hidayat	21	21
(India) Anup Sridhar	19	14
(Malaysia) Yeoh Kay Bin	14	21	17
(China) Chen Hong	21	17	21

Final
(Indonesia) Taufik Hidayat	21	21
(China) Chen Hong	18	19

=== Women's singles ===
Semi-finals
(Hong Kong) Wang Chen	13	17
(China) Jiang Yanjiao	21	21
(Malaysia) Wong Mew Choo	17	18
(China) Lu Lan	21	21

Final
(China) Jiang Yanjiao	25	23
(China) Lu Lan	23	21

=== Men's doubles ===
Semi-finals
(Malaysia) Choong Tan Fook (Malaysia) Lee Wan Wah	11	21	21
(Malaysia) Mohd Fairuzizuan Mohd Tazari (Malaysia) Mohd Zakry Abdul Latif	21	13	15
(Chinese Taipei) Hu Chung-hsien (Chinese Taipei) Tsai Chia-hsin	21	16	10
(Malaysia) Koo Kien Keat (Malaysia) Tan Boon Heong	18	21	21

Final
(Malaysia) Choong Tan Fook (Malaysia) Lee Wan Wah	21	11	21
(Malaysia) Koo Kien Keat (Malaysia) Tan Boon Heong	14	21	12

=== Women's doubles ===
Semi-finals
(China) Cheng Shu (China) Zhao Yunlei	21	21
(Thailand) Duanganong Aroonkesorn (Thailand) Kunchala Voravichitchaikul	14	6
(Japan) Kumiko Ogura (Japan) Reiko Shiota	15	9
(China) Yang Wei (China) Zhao Tingting	21	21

Final
(China) Cheng Shu (China) Zhao Yunlei	10	11
(China) Yang Wei (China) Zhao Tingting	21	21

=== Mixed doubles ===
Semi-finals
(China) Xu Chen (China) Zhao Tingting	21	23
(Malaysia) Mohd Fairuzizuan Mohd Tazari (Malaysia) Wong Pei Tty	19	21
(Indonesia) Devin Lahardi (Indonesia) Lita Nurlita	16	12
(China) He Hanbin (China) Yu Yang	21	21

Final
(China) Xu Chen (China) Zhao Tingting	20	15
(China) He Hanbin (China) Yu Yang	22	21
