= 2005 Denmark Open =

Badminton competition

The 2005 Denmark Open in badminton was held in Aarhus, Denmark, from October 18 to October 23, 2005.

== Venue ==
- Aarhus Atletion, The Arena

== Results ==
=== Men's singles ===
Quarterfinals
(Netherlands) Eric Pang	6	15	5
(Denmark) Niels Christian Kaldau	15	11	15
(Malaysia) Muhd Hafiz Hashim	11	15	15
(India) Chetan Anand	15	10	9
(Malaysia) Wong Choong Hann	15	3	15
(China) Chen Jin	13	15	13
(Netherlands) Dicky Palyama	12	0
(Malaysia) Lee Chong Wei	15	15

Semifinals
(Denmark) Niels Christian Kaldau	5	2
(Malaysia) Muhd Hafiz Hashim	15	15
(Malaysia) Wong Choong Hann	14	4
(Malaysia) Lee Chong Wei	17	15

Finals
(Malaysia) Muhd Hafiz Hashim	14	8
(Malaysia) Lee Chong Wei	17	15

=== Others ===
Category	Winners	Runners-up	Score
Women's singles	(France) Pi Hongyan	(Germany) Xu Huaiwen	7–11, 11–4, 11–5
Men's doubles	(Malaysia) Chan Chong Ming & Koo Kien Keat	(Denmark) Lars Paaske & Jonas Rasmussen	15–6, 15–7
Women's doubles	(Japan) Kumiko Ogura & Reiko Shiota	(England) Gail Emms & Donna Kellogg	15–6, 15–9
Mixed doubles	(Denmark) Thomas Laybourn & Kamilla Rytter Juhl	(Denmark) Lars Paaske & Helle Nielsen	15–8, 15–9
