= 2006 Macau Open (badminton) =

The 2006 Macau Open Badminton Championships was the first edition of the Macau Open Badminton Championships. It was held in the Tap Seac Multi-sports Pavilion from July 19 to July 23, 2006, and the prize money was US$120,000.

== Medalists ==
Event	Champion	Runner up	Third place	Third place
Men's singles	(China) Lin Dan	(Malaysia) Lee Chong Wei	(South Korea) Lee Hyun-il	(China) Chen Hong
Women's singles	(Netherlands) Judith Meulendijks	(Hong Kong) Yip Pui Yin	(Hong Kong) Wang Chen	(Netherlands) Yao Jie
Men's doubles	(China) Fu Haifeng (China) Cai Yun	(China) Guo Zhendong (China) Zheng Bo	(South Korea) Hwang Ji-man (South Korea) Lee Jae-jin	(Denmark) Lars Paaske (Denmark) Mathias Boe
Women's doubles	(China) Huang Sui (China) Gao Ling	(South Korea) Lee Kyung-won (South Korea) Lee Hyo-jung	(China) Wei Yili (China) Zhang Yawen	(Denmark) Lena Frier Kristiansen (Denmark) Kamilla Rytter Juhl
Mixed doubles	(Denmark) Thomas Laybourn (Denmark) Kamilla Rytter Juhl	(China) Zhang Jun (China) Gao Ling	(Denmark) Lars Paaske (Denmark) Helle Nielsen	(China) Zheng Bo (China) Yu Yang
