= Lee Kyung-won =

South Korean badminton player (born 1980)

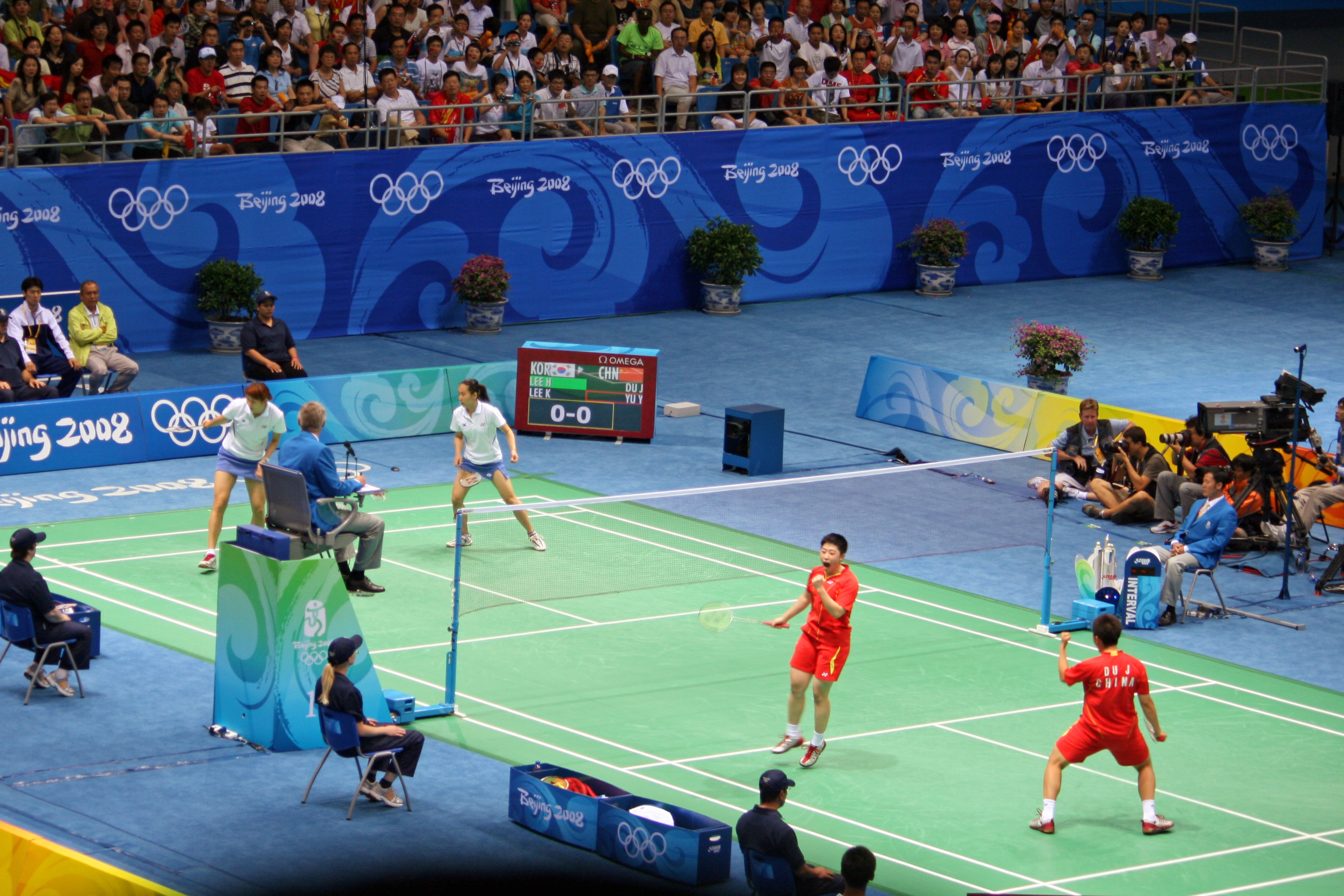
- Lee Kyung-won at the 2008 Summer Olympics Women's Doubles Final

Personal information
- Born: 이경원; 21 January 1980 (age 46) Andong, North Gyeongsang Province, South Korea
- Height: 1.60 m (5 ft 3 in)
- Weight: 58 kg (128 lb)

Sport
- Country: South Korea
- Sport: Badminton
- Handedness: Right

Women's & mixed doubles
- Highest ranking: 4 (WD 14 January 2010)
- BWF profile
Medal record
Women's badminton
Representing South Korea
Olympic Games
Silver medal – second place	2008 Beijing	Women's doubles
Bronze medal – third place	2004 Athens	Women's doubles
World Championships
Bronze medal – third place	2001 Sevilla	Women's doubles
Bronze medal – third place	2005 Anaheim	Women's doubles
Sudirman Cup
Gold medal – first place	2003 Eindhoven	Mixed team
Silver medal – second place	2009 Guangzhou	Mixed team
Bronze medal – third place	1999 Copenhagen	Mixed team
Bronze medal – third place	2001 Sevilla	Mixed team
Bronze medal – third place	2005 Beijing	Mixed team
Bronze medal – third place	2007 Glasgow	Mixed team
Uber Cup
Gold medal – first place	2010 Kuala Lumpur	Women's team
Silver medal – second place	2002 Guangzhou	Women's team
Silver medal – second place	2004 Jakarta	Women's team
Bronze medal – third place	1998 Hong Kong	Women's team
Bronze medal – third place	2000 Kuala Lumpur	Women's team
Bronze medal – third place	2008 Jakarta	Women's team
Asian Games
Gold medal – first place	2002 Busan	Women's doubles
Silver medal – second place	1998 Bangkok	Women's team
Silver medal – second place	2002 Busan	Women's team
Bronze medal – third place	2006 Doha	Women's doubles
Bronze medal – third place	2006 Doha	Women's team
Bronze medal – third place	2010 Guangzhou	Women's doubles
Bronze medal – third place	2010 Guangzhou	Women's team
Asian Championships
Gold medal – first place	2003 Jakarta	Women's doubles
Gold medal – first place	2004 Kuala Lumpur	Women's doubles
Gold medal – first place	2005 Hyderabad	Women's doubles
Silver medal – second place	2009 Suwon	Women's doubles
Bronze medal – third place	2000 Jakarta	Women's doubles
Bronze medal – third place	2000 Jakarta	Women's singles
Bronze medal – third place	2008 Johor Bahru	Women's doubles
East Asian Games
Silver medal – second place	1997 Busan	Women's team
Bronze medal – third place	1997 Busan	Mixed doubles
World Junior Championships
Bronze medal – third place	1996 Silkeborg	Girls' singles
Asian Junior Championships
Bronze medal – third place	1997 Manila	Girls' team

- Lee Kyung-won
- Hangul: 이경원
- Hanja: 李敬元
- RR: I Gyeongwon
- MR: I Kyŏngwŏn

Lee Kyung-won (Korean: 이경원; Hanja: 李敬元; Korean pronunciation: [i.ɡjʌŋ.wʌn]; born 21 January 1980 in Andong, North Gyeongsang Province) is a badminton player from South Korea. Lee was the women's doubles gold medallist at the 2002 Asian Games. She competed at the Olympic Games in 2000, 2004, and 2008, winning women's doubles bronze in 2004, and silver in 2008. She captured the women's doubles gold at the Asian Championships in 2003, 2004 and 2005. Lee educated at the Sungji Girls' Middle School, Sungji Girls' High School, and graduated from the Yong In University.

== Achievements ==
=== Olympic Games ===
Women's doubles
Year	Venue	Partner	Opponent	Score	Result
2004	Goudi Olympic Hall; Athens, Greece	(South Korea) Ra Kyung-min	(China) Wei Yili (China) Zhao Tingting	10–15, 15–9, 15–7	Bronze
2008	Beijing University of Technology Gymnasium; Beijing, China	(South Korea) Lee Hyo-jung	(China) Du Jing (China) Yu Yang	15–21, 13–21	Silver

=== BWF World Championships ===
Women's doubles
Year	Venue	Partner	Opponent	Score	Result
2001	Palacio de Deportes de San Pablo; Seville, Spain	(South Korea) Ra Kyung-min	(China) Wei Yili (China) Zhang Jiewen	11–15, 3–15	Bronze
2005	Arrowhead Pond; Anaheim, United States	(South Korea) Lee Hyo-jung	(China) Yang Wei (China) Zhang Jiewen	4–15, 3–15	Bronze

=== Asian Games ===
Women's doubles
Year	Venue	Partner	Opponent	Score	Result
2002	Gangseo Gymnasium; Busan, South Korea	(South Korea) Ra Kyung-min	(China) Gao Ling (China) Huang Sui	11–8, 11–7	Gold
2006	Aspire Hall 3 Doha, Qatar	(South Korea) Lee Hyo-jung	(China) Gao Ling (China) Huang Sui	16–21, 12–21	Bronze
2010	Tianhe Gymnasium; Guangzhou, China	(South Korea) Ha Jung-eun	(China) Wang Xiaoli (China) Yu Yang	17–21, 14–21	Bronze

=== Asian Championships ===
Women's singles
Year	Venue	Opponent	Score	Result
2000	Istora Senayan, Jakarta, Indonesia	(Indonesia) Ellen Angelina	0–11, 4–11	Bronze

Women's doubles
Year	Venue	Partner	Opponent	Score	Result
2000	Istora Senayan; Jakarta, Indonesia	(South Korea) Chung Jae-hee	(Indonesia) Eti Tantri (Indonesia) Minarti Timur	12–15, 15–9, 13–15	Bronze
2003	Tennis Indoor Gelora Bung Karno; Jakarta, Indonesia	(South Korea) Ra Kyung-min	(South Korea) Hwang Yu-mi (South Korea) Lee Hyo-jung	15–9, 15–7	Gold
2004	Kuala Lumpur Badminton Stadium; Kuala Lumpur, Malaysia	(South Korea) Lee Hyo-jung	(China) Du Jing (China) Yu Yang	6–15, 15–11, 15–7	Gold
2005	Gachibowli Indoor Stadium; Hyderabad, India	(South Korea) Lee Hyo-jung	(Japan) Kumiko Ogura (Japan) Reiko Shiota	15–13, 8–15, 15–5	Gold
2008	Bandaraya Stadium; Johor Bahru, Malaysia	(South Korea) Lee Hyo-jung	(Chinese Taipei) Cheng Wen-hsing (Chinese Taipei) Chien Yu-chin	18–21, 5–21	Bronze
2009	Suwon Indoor Stadium; Suwon, South Korea	(South Korea) Lee Hyo-jung	(China) Ma Jin (China) Wang Xiaoli	11–21, 18–21	Silver

=== East Asian Games ===
Mixed doubles
Year	Venue	Partner	Opponent	Score	Result
1997	Pukyong National University Gymnasium; Busan, South Korea	(South Korea) Yoo Yong-sung			Bronze

=== World Junior Championships ===
Girls' singles
Year	Venue	Opponent	Score	Result
1996	Silkeborg Hallerne, Silkeborg, Denmark	(India) Aparna Popat	11–4, 5–11, 3–11	Bronze

=== BWF Superseries ===
The BWF Superseries, which was launched on 14 December 2006 and implemented in 2007, is a series of elite badminton tournaments, sanctioned by the Badminton World Federation (BWF). BWF Superseries levels are Superseries and Superseries Premier. A season of Superseries consists of twelve tournaments around the world that have been introduced since 2011. Successful players are invited to the Superseries Finals, which are held at the end of each year.

Women's doubles
Year	Tournament	Partner	Opponent	Score	Result
2007	Swiss Open	(South Korea) Lee Hyo-jung	(China) Yang Wei (China) Zhao Tingting	15–21, 10–21	(silver) Runner-up
2007	Denmark Open	(South Korea) Lee Hyo-jung	(China) Yang Wei (China) Zhang Jiewen	21–12, 19–21, 19–21	(silver) Runner-up
2008	All England Open	(South Korea) Lee Hyo-jung	(China) Du Jing (China) Yu Yang	12–21, 21–18, 21–14	(gold) Winner
2009	Malaysia Open	(South Korea) Lee Hyo-jung	(China) Yang Wei (China) Zhang Jiewen	21–15, 21–12	(gold) Winner
2009	Korea Open	(South Korea) Lee Hyo-jung	(Chinese Taipei) Cheng Wen-hsing (Chinese Taipei) Chien Yu-chin	19–21, 8–21	(silver) Runner-up
2009	Swiss Open	(South Korea) Lee Hyo-jung	(China) Du Jing (China) Yu Yang	11–21, 12–21	(silver) Runner-up

BWF Super Series Finals tournament
BWF Super Series Premier tournament
BWF Super Series tournament

=== BWF Grand Prix ===
The BWF Grand Prix had two levels, the BWF Grand Prix and Grand Prix Gold. It was a series of badminton tournaments sanctioned by the Badminton World Federation (BWF) which was held from 2007 to 2017. The World Badminton Grand Prix has been sanctioned by the International Badminton Federation from 1983 to 2006.

Women's doubles
Year	Tournament	Partner	Opponent	Score	Result
2001	Swiss Open	(South Korea) Ra Kyung-min	(Denmark) Helene Kirkegaard (Denmark) Rikke Olsen	7–3, 8–6, 2–7, 7–4	(gold) Winner
2002	Swiss Open	(South Korea) Ra Kyung-min	(England) Gail Emms (Netherlands) Lotte Jonathans	7–1, 7–1, 7–1	(gold) Winner
2002	Japan Open	(South Korea) Ra Kyung-min	(China) Gao Ling (China) Huang Sui	7–5, 1–7, 7–2, 6–8, 7–1	(gold) Winner
2003	Korea Open	(South Korea) Ra Kyung-min	(Denmark) Ann-Lou Jørgensen (Denmark) Rikke Olsen	11–5, 11–5	(gold) Winner
2003	Dutch Open	(South Korea) Ra Kyung-min	(South Korea) Hwang Yu-mi (South Korea) Lee Hyo-jung	15–4, 15–9	(gold) Winner
2003	German Open	(South Korea) Ra Kyung-min	(China) Yang Wei (China) Zhang Jiewen	15–6, 15–17, 15–8	(gold) Winner
2003	Chinese Taipei Open	(South Korea) Ra Kyung-min	(South Korea) Hwang Yu-mi (South Korea) Lee Hyo-jung	15–9, 15–8	(gold) Winner
2004	Korea Open	(South Korea) Ra Kyung-min	(China) Yang Wei (China) Zhang Jiewen	8–15, 15–9, 6–15	(silver) Runner-up
2004	Japan Open	(South Korea) Ra Kyung-min	(China) Wei Yili (China) Zhao Tingting	15–6, 5–15, 15–1	(gold) Winner
2005	Korea Open	(South Korea) Lee Hyo-jung	(England) Gail Emms (England) Donna Kellogg	Walkover	(gold) Winner
2005	Swiss Open	(South Korea) Lee Hyo-jung	(Chinese Taipei) Cheng Wen-hsing (Chinese Taipei) Chien Yu-chin	15–8, 15–12	(gold) Winner
2005	Thailand Open	(South Korea) Lee Hyo-jung	(China) Zhang Dan (China) Zhang Yawen	9–15, 15–11, 15–13	(gold) Winner
2005	Indonesia Open	(South Korea) Lee Hyo-jung	(Malaysia) Chin Eei Hui (Malaysia) Wong Pei Tty	15–4, 15–5	(gold) Winner
2006	Chinese Taipei Open	(South Korea) Lee Hyo-jung	(China) Gao Ling (China) Huang Sui	21–18, 9–21, 21–17	(gold) Winner
2006	Macau Open	(South Korea) Lee Hyo-jung	(China) Gao Ling (China) Huang Sui	21–17, 14–21, 14–21	(silver) Runner-up
2006	Thailand Open	(South Korea) Lee Hyo-jung	(Thailand) Sathinee Chankrachangwong (Thailand) Saralee Thungthongkam	21–18, 21–9	(gold) Winner
2007	Macau Open	(South Korea) Lee Hyo-jung	(China) Gao Ling (China) Huang Sui	15–21, 7–21	(silver) Runner-up
2008	German Open	(South Korea) Lee Hyo-jung	(Japan) Miyuki Maeda (Japan) Satoko Suetsuna	21–17, 21–16	(gold) Winner
2010	Australian Open	(South Korea) Kim Min-seo	(South Korea) Kang Hae-won (South Korea) Seo Yoon-hee	21–17, 21–17	(gold) Winner
2010	Chinese Taipei Open	(South Korea) Yoo Hyun-young	(South Korea) Kim Min-jung (South Korea) Lee Hyo-jung	14–21, 20–22	(silver) Runner-up

Mixed doubles
Year	Tournament	Partner	Opponent	Score	Result
2002	Dutch Open	(South Korea) Kim Dong-moon	(South Korea) Ha Tae-kwon (South Korea) Hwang Yu-mi	11–9, 11–2	(gold) Winner

BWF Grand Prix Gold tournament
BWF Grand Prix tournament

=== BWF International Challenge/Series/Satellite ===
Women's singles
Year	Tournament	Opponent	Score	Result
1996	French Open	(Sweden) Marina Andrievskaya	6–11, 3–11	(silver) Runner-up

Women's doubles
Year	Tournament	Partner	Opponent	Score	Result
2002	Malaysia Satellite	(South Korea) Jung Yeon-kyung	(South Korea) Chung Jae-hee (South Korea) Yim Kyung-jin	2–11, 11–3, 8–11	(silver) Runner-up
2009	Korea International	(South Korea) Lee Hyo-jung	(South Korea) Jung Kyung-eun (South Korea) Yoo Hyun-young	19–21, 10–21	(silver) Runner-up

Mixed doubles
Year	Tournament	Partner	Opponent	Score	Result
2002	Malaysia Satellite	(South Korea) Ha Tae-kwon	(Indonesia) Robby Istanta (Indonesia) Yunita Tetty	11–6, 11–0	(gold) Winner

BWF International Challenge tournament
BWF International Series tournament
