= Yang Wei (badminton) =

Chinese badminton player

Yang Wei 杨维
Personal information
- Born: 13 January 1979 (age 47) Wuhan, Hubei, China
- Height: 1.72 m (5 ft 8 in)
- Weight: 65 kg (143 lb)

Sport
- Country: China
- Sport: Badminton
- Handedness: Right

Women's doubles
- Highest ranking: 1 (with Huang Nanyan June 1999); 1 (with Zhang Jiewen October 2003)
- BWF profile
Medal record
Women's badminton
Representing China
Olympic Games
Gold medal – first place	2004 Athens	Women's doubles
Silver medal – second place	2000 Sydney	Women's doubles
World Championships
Gold medal – first place	2005 Anaheim	Women's doubles
Gold medal – first place	2007 Kuala Lumpur	Women's doubles
Bronze medal – third place	2006 Madrid	Women's doubles
World Cup
Gold medal – first place	2005 Yiyang	Women's doubles
Silver medal – second place	2006 Yiyang	Women's doubles
Sudirman Cup
Gold medal – first place	1999 Copenhagen	Mixed team
Gold medal – first place	2001 Seville	Mixed team
Gold medal – first place	2005 Beijing	Mixed team
Gold medal – first place	2007 Glasgow	Mixed team
Uber Cup
Gold medal – first place	2000 Kuala Lumpur	Women's team
Gold medal – first place	2002 Guangzhou	Women's team
Gold medal – first place	2004 Jakarta	Women's team
Gold medal – first place	2006 Sendai & Tokyo	Women's team
Gold medal – first place	2008 Jakarta	Women's team
Asian Games
Gold medal – first place	2002 Busan	Women's team
Gold medal – first place	2006 Doha	Women's team
Silver medal – second place	2006 Doha	Women's doubles
Bronze medal – third place	2002 Busan	Women's doubles
Asian Championships
Gold medal – first place	2002 Bangkok	Women's doubles
Gold medal – first place	2007 Johor Bahru	Women's doubles
Gold medal – first place	2008 Johor Bahru	Women's doubles
Bronze medal – third place	2009 Suwon	Women's doubles
World Junior Championships
Gold medal – first place	1996 Silkeborg	Girls' doubles
Asia Junior Championships
Gold medal – first place	1997 Manila	Girls' team
Gold medal – first place	1997 Manila	Girls' doubles

Yang Wei (simplified Chinese: 杨维; traditional Chinese: 楊維; pinyin: Yáng Wéi; Cantonese Yale: Yeung Wai; born 13 January 1979) is a Chinese former badminton player who affiliate with Guangdong provincial team.

== Career ==
A woman's doubles specialist, Yang has won some forty international titles, most of them in the sport's top tier events, since 1998. Prior to 2003 she partnered Huang Nanyan with whom she earned a silver medal at the 2000 Sydney Olympics and gained the winning point against South Korea in the 2002 Uber Cup (women's world team championship) final. Her subsequent partnership with Zhang Jiewen has been even more successful as they have shared international domination with compatriot rivals Gao Ling and Huang Sui. Yang and Zhang captured gold at the 2004 Athens Olympics by defeating Gao and Huang in the final. They bested the same team in winning both the 2005 and 2007 BWF World Championships. On the other hand, Gao and Huang have been an obstacle for them at the prestigious All-England Championships, defeating Yang and Zhang in the 2003, 2004, and 2006 finals. Curiously, this is the one major tournament that neither Yang nor Zhang has ever won.

In 2008 Yang helped China to secure its sixth consecutive Uber Cup title and won women's doubles at the Swiss, Thailand, and Malaysia Opens with Zhang Jiewen. At the Beijing Olympics where they were first seeded, however, Yang and Zhang were upset in the quarterfinals by Japan's Miyuki Maeda and Satoko Suetsuna. The event was eventually won by a younger Chinese pair, Du Jing and Yu Yang, perhaps signaling a changing of the guard in the Chinese dynasty. Yang Wei received an award during a ceremony to mark her retirement with five other teammates from the Chinese national badminton team on the sidelines of the China Open badminton event in Shanghai, 23 November 2008.

== Achievements ==
=== Olympic Games ===
Women's doubles
Year	Venue	Partner	Opponent	Score	Result
2000	The Dome, Sydney, Australia	(China) Huang Nanyan	(China) Ge Fei (China) Gu Jun	5–15, 5–15	Silver
2004	Goudi Olympic Hall, Athens, Greece	(China) Zhang Jiewen	(China) Gao Ling (China) Huang Sui	7–15, 15–4, 15–8	Gold

=== BWF World Championships ===
Women's doubles
Year	Venue	Partner	Opponent	Score	Result
2005	Arrowhead Pond, Anaheim, United States	(China) Zhang Jiewen	(China) Gao Ling (China) Huang Sui	17–16, 15–7	Gold
2006	Palacio de Deportes de la Comunidad, Madrid, Spain	(China) Zhang Jiewen	(China) Wei Yili (China) Zhang Yawen	14–21, 19–21	Bronze
2007	Putra Indoor Stadium, Kuala Lumpur, Malaysia	(China) Zhang Jiewen	(China) Gao Ling (China) Huang Sui	21–16, 21–19	Gold

=== World Cup ===
Women's doubles
Year	Venue	Partner	Opponent	Score	Result
2005	Olympic Park, Yiyang, China	(China) Zhang Jiewen	(China) Wei Yili (China) Zhang Yawen	21–18, 21–15	Gold
2006	Olympic Park, Yiyang, China	(China) Zhang Jiewen	(China) Gao Ling (China) Huang Sui	19–21, 6–21	Silver

=== Asian Games ===
Women's doubles
Year	Venue	Partner	Opponent	Score	Result
2002	Gangseo Gymnasium, Busan, South Korea	(China) Huang Nanyan	(South Korea) Lee Kyung-won (South Korea) Ra Kyung-min	7–11, 9–11	Bronze
2006	Aspire Hall 3, Doha, Qatar	(China) Zhang Jiewen	(China) Gao Ling (China) Huang Sui	21–18, 21–23, 14–21	Silver

=== Asian Championships ===
Women's doubles
Year	Venue	Partner	Opponent	Score	Result
2002	Nimibutr Stadium, Bangkok, Thailand	(China) Zhang Jiewen	(China) Gao Ling (China) Huang Sui	11–8, 11–6	Gold
2007	Bandaraya Stadium, Johor Bahru, Malaysia	(China) Zhao Tingting	(China) Cheng Shu (China) Zhao Yunlei	21–10, 21–11	Gold
2008	Bandaraya Stadium, Johor Bahru, Malaysia	(China) Zhang Jiewen	(Chinese Taipei) Cheng Wen-hsing (Chinese Taipei) Chien Yu-chin	22–20, 21–16	Gold
2009	Suwon Indoor Stadium, Suwon, South Korea	(China) Zhang Jiewen	(China) Ma Jin (China) Wang Xiaoli	16–21, 20–22	Bronze

=== World Junior Championships ===
Girls' doubles
Year	Venue	Partner	Opponent	Score	Result
1996	Silkeborg Hallerne, Silkeborg, Denmark	(China) Gao Ling	(China) Lu Ying (China) Zhan Xubin	15–12, 15–8	Gold

=== Asian Junior Championships ===
Girls' doubles
Year	Venue	Partner	Opponent	Score	Result
1997	Ninoy Aquino Stadium, Manila, Philippines	(China) Gao Ling	(Malaysia) Chor Hooi Yee (Malaysia) Lim Pek Siah	15–10, 15–8	Gold

=== BWF Superseries (5 titles, 6 runners-up) ===
The BWF Superseries, which was launched on 14 December 2006 and implemented in 2007, is a series of elite badminton tournaments, sanctioned by the Badminton World Federation (BWF). BWF Superseries levels are Superseries and Superseries Premier. A season of Superseries consists of twelve tournaments around the world that have been introduced since 2011. Successful players are invited to the Superseries Finals, which are held at the end of each year.

Women's doubles
Year	Tournament	Partner	Opponent	Score	Result
2007	Korea Open	(China) Zhang Jiewen	(China) Gao Ling (China) Huang Sui	21–12, 14–21, 16–21	(silver) Runner-up
2007	All England Open	(China) Zhang Jiewen	(China) Wei Yili (China) Zhang Yawen	16–21, 21–8, 22–24	(silver) Runner-up
2007	Swiss Open	(China) Zhao Tingting	(South Korea) Lee Hyo-jung (South Korea) Lee Kyung-won	21–15, 21–10	(gold) Winner
2007	Singapore Open	(China) Zhao Tingting	(China) Wei Yili (China) Zhang Yawen	21–10, 19–21, 18–21	(silver) Runner-up
2007	Indonesia Open	(China) Zhao Tingting	(China) Du Jing (China) Yu Yang	8–21, 21–16, 20–22	(silver) Runner-up
2007	China Masters	(China) Zhao Tingting	(Indonesia) Vita Marissa (Indonesia) Liliyana Natsir	21–12, 15–21, 16–21	(silver) Runner-up
2007	Japan Open	(China) Zhang Jiewen	(China) Yu Yang (China) Zhao Tingting	21–17, 21–5	(gold) Winner
2007	Denmark Open	(China) Zhang Jiewen	(South Korea) Lee Hyo-jung (South Korea) Lee Kyung-won	12–21, 21–19, 21–19	(gold) Winner
2008	Malaysia Open	(China) Zhang Jiewen	(China) Gao Ling (China) Zhao Tingting	21–13, 16–21, 24–22	(gold) Winner
2008	Swiss Open	(China) Zhang Jiewen	(China) Wei Yili (China) Zhang Yawen	21–18, 22–24, 21–8	(gold) Winner
2009	Malaysia Open	(China) Zhang Jiewen	(South Korea) Lee Hyo-jung (South Korea) Lee Kyung-won	15–21, 12–21	(silver) Runner-up

BWF Super Series Finals tournament
BWF Super Series Premier tournament
BWF Super Series tournament

=== BWF Grand Prix (33 titles, 20 runners-up) ===
The BWF Grand Prix had two levels, the BWF Grand Prix and Grand Prix Gold. It was a series of badminton tournaments sanctioned by the Badminton World Federation (BWF) which was held from 2007 to 2017. The World Badminton Grand Prix has been sanctioned by the International Badminton Federation from 1983 to 2006.

Women's doubles
Year	Tournament	Partner	Opponent	Score	Result
1998	Brunei Open	(China) Huang Nanyan	(Denmark) Rikke Olsen (Denmark) Marlene Thomsen	15–11, 17–14	(gold) Winner
1998	Dutch Open	(China) Huang Nanyan	(Japan) Naomi Murakami (Japan) Hiromi Yamada	15–7, 15–4	(gold) Winner
1998	Denmark Open	(China) Huang Nanyan	(China) Qin Yiyuan (China) Tang Yongshu	17–15, 10–15, 11–15	(silver) Runner-up
1999	Korea Open	(China) Huang Nanyan	(China) Ge Fei (China) Zhang Ning	15–10, 15–1	(gold) Winner
1999	Chinese Taipei Open	(China) Huang Nanyan	(Denmark) Helene Kirkegaard (Denmark) Rikke Olsen	13–15, 4–15	(silver) Runner-up
1999	Japan Open	(China) Huang Nanyan	(China) Ge Fei (China) Gu Jun	15–12, 16–17, 5–15	(silver) Runner-up
1999	Singapore Open	(China) Huang Nanyan	(Indonesia) Carmelita (Indonesia) Indarti Issolina	15–3, 15–8	(gold) Winner
2000	Korea Open	(China) Huang Nanyan	(South Korea) Chung Jae-hee (South Korea) Ra Kyung-min	6–15, 15–8, 5–15	(silver) Runner-up
2000	Swiss Open	(China) Huang Nanyan	(China) Gao Ling (China) Qin Yiyuan	5–15, 15–8, 9–15	(silver) Runner-up
2000	Japan Open	(China) Huang Nanyan	(China) Ge Fei (China) Gu Jun	13–15, 15–4, 15–11	(gold) Winner
2000	Thailand Open	(China) Huang Nanyan	(China) Ge Fei (China) Gu Jun	8–15, 11–15	(silver) Runner-up
2000	Malaysia Open	(China) Huang Nanyan	(China) Ge Fei (China) Gu Jun	17–15, 6–15, 8–15	(silver) Runner-up
2000	World Grand Prix Finals	(China) Huang Nanyan	(China) Chen Lin (China) Jiang Xuelian	8–6, 7–3, 3–7, 7–3	(gold) Winner
2001	Korea Open	(China) Huang Nanyan	(South Korea) Kim Kyeung-ran (South Korea) Ra Kyung-min	15–13, 15–10	(gold) Winner
2001	Japan Open	(China) Huang Nanyan	(China) Gao Ling (China) Huang Sui	13–15, 10–15	(silver) Runner-up
2001	Malaysia Open	(China) Huang Nanyan	(China) Gao Ling (China) Huang Sui	7–1, 4–7, 7–3, 7–0	(gold) Winner
2001	China Open	(China) Huang Nanyan	(China) Wei Yili (China) Zhang Jiewen	6–8, 3–7, 8–6, 7–8	(silver) Runner-up
2002	Malaysia Open	(China) Huang Nanyan	(China) Zhang Yawen (China) Zhao Tingting	11–5, 11–5	(gold) Winner
2002	Singapore Open	(China) Huang Nanyan	(South Korea) Hwang Yu-mi (South Korea) Lee Hyo-jung	11–1, 11–8	(gold) Winner
2003	All England Open	(China) Zhang Jiewen	(China) Gao Ling (China) Huang Sui	9–11, 7–11	(silver) Runner-up
2003	Swiss Open	(China) Zhang Jiewen	(China) Wei Yili (China) Zhao Tingting	11–7, 6–11, 11–4	(gold) Winner
2003	Singapore Open	(China) Zhang Jiewen	(China) Gao Ling (China) Huang Sui	17–16, 15–7	(gold) Winner
2003	Indonesia Open	(China) Zhang Jiewen	(China) Gao Ling (China) Huang Sui	Walkover	(silver) Runner-up
2003	Malaysia Open	(China) Zhang Jiewen	(China) Gao Ling (China) Huang Sui	15–5, 1–15, 17–15	(gold) Winner
2003	Denmark Open	(China) Zhang Jiewen	(China) Zhang Dan (China) Zhang Yawen	15–2, 15–1	(gold) Winner
2003	German Open	(China) Zhang Jiewen	(South Korea) Lee Kyung-won (South Korea) Ra Kyung-min	6–15, 17–15, 8–15	(silver) Runner-up
2003	Hong Kong Open	(China) Zhang Jiewen	(China) Gao Ling (China) Huang Sui	14–17, 5–15	(silver) Runner-up
2003	China Open	(China) Zhang Jiewen	(China) Gao Ling (China) Huang Sui	8–15, 12–15	(silver) Runner-up
2004	Swiss Open	(China) Zhang Jiewen	(China) Gao Ling (China) Huang Sui	Walkover	(silver) Runner-up
2004	All England Open	(China) Zhang Jiewen	(China) Gao Ling (China) Huang Sui	Walkover	(silver) Runner-up
2004	Korea Open	(China) Zhang Jiewen	(South Korea) Lee Kyung-won (South Korea) Ra Kyung-min	15–8, 9–15, 15–6	(gold) Winner
2004	Malaysia Open	(China) Zhang Jiewen	(China) Gao Ling (China) Huang Sui	15–7, 15–6	(gold) Winner
2004	China Open	(China) Zhang Jiewen	(China) Wei Yili (China) Zhao Tingting	15–14, 15–12	(gold) Winner
2004	Singapore Open	(China) Zhang Jiewen	(Thailand) Sathinee Chankrachangwong (Thailand) Saralee Thungthongkam	15–5, 9–15, 15–11	(gold) Winner
2004	Indonesia Open	(China) Zhang Jiewen	(China) Zhang Dan (China) Zhang Yawen	15–10, 15–5	(gold) Winner
2005	Japan Open	(China) Zhang Jiewen	(China) Wei Yili (China) Zhao Tingting	15–12, 15–2	(gold) Winner
2005	Malaysia Open	(China) Zhang Jiewen	(China) Gao Ling (China) Huang Sui	15–6, 15–8	(gold) Winner
2005	Hong Kong Open	(China) Zhang Jiewen	(China) Gao Ling (China) Huang Sui	15–13, 8–15, 15–6	(gold) Winner
2005	China Open	(China) Zhang Jiewen	(China) Gao Ling (China) Huang Sui	15–10, 15–4	(gold) Winner
2006	German Open	(China) Zhang Jiewen	(China) Gao Ling (China) Huang Sui	3–15, 15–11, 15–10	(gold) Winner
2006	All England Open	(China) Zhang Jiewen	(China) Gao Ling (China) Huang Sui	15–6, 11–15, 2–15	(silver) Runner-up
2006	Indonesia Open	(China) Zhang Jiewen	(China) Wei Yili (China) Zhang Yawen	13–21, 13–21	(silver) Runner-up
2006	Singapore Open	(China) Zhang Jiewen	(China) Zhang Dan (China) Zhao Tingting	21–18, 21–18	(gold) Winner
2006	Korea Open	(China) Zhang Jiewen	(Indonesia) Jo Novita (Indonesia) Greysia Polii	21–10, 21–11	(gold) Winner
2006	Hong Kong Open	(China) Zhang Jiewen	(China) Gao Ling (China) Huang Sui	21–19, 15–21, 21–19	(gold) Winner
2006	China Open	(China) Zhang Jiewen	(China) Wei Yili (China) Zhang Yawen	21–17, 21–7	(gold) Winner
2007	German Open	(China) Zhang Jiewen	(China) Du Jing (China) Yu Yang	21–8, 21–7	(gold) Winner
2007	Bitburger Open	(China) Zhang Jiewen	(England) Natalie Munt (England) Joanne Nicholas	21–11, 21–10	(gold) Winner
2008	Thailand Open	(China) Zhang Jiewen	(Malaysia) Chin Eei Hui (Malaysia) Wong Pei Tty	15–21, 21–13, 21–13	(gold) Winner
2009	Thailand Open	(China) Zhang Jiewen	(China) Gao Ling (China) Wei Yili	22–24, 21–17, 21–15	(gold) Winner
2009	Macau Open	(China) Zhang Jiewen	(China) Du Jing (China) Yu Yang	16–21, 11–21	(silver) Runner-up
2009	Chinese Taipei Open	(China) Zhang Jiewen	(Indonesia) Vita Marissa (United States) Mona Santoso	21–14, 21–9	(gold) Winner

Mixed doubles
Year	Tournament	Partner	Opponent	Score	Result
1998	Dutch Open	(China) Chen Qiqiu	(Denmark) Jon Holst-Christensen (Denmark) Ann Jorgensen	7–15, 6–15	(silver) Runner-up

BWF Grand Prix Gold tournament
BWF Grand Prix tournament
