= 2006 IBF World Grand Prix =

Tournament details
- Dates: January 3, 2006 – December 17, 2006
- Edition: 24th

The 2006 IBF World Grand Prix was the twenty-fourth, and the last edition of the IBF World Grand Prix of badminton. It was replaced by the BWF Super Series & BWF Grand Prix Gold and Grand Prix for the 2007 season.

== Results ==
Below is the schedule released by International Badminton Federation:

=== Key ===
6-stars
5-stars
4-stars
3-stars
2-stars
1-star

=== Winners ===
Tour	Report	Men's singles	Women's singles	Men's doubles	Women's doubles	Mixed doubles
6-stars
China Masters	Report	(China) Chen Jin	(China) Wang Lin	(Denmark) Jens Eriksen (Denmark) Martin Lundgaard Hansen	(China) Gao Ling (China) Huang Sui	(China) Xie Zhongbo (China) Zhang Yawen
Indonesia Open	Report	(Indonesia) Taufik Hidayat	(China) Zhu Lin	(United States) Tony Gunawan (Indonesia) Candra Wijaya	(China) Wei Yili (China) Zhang Yawen	(China) Xie Zhongbo (China) Zhang Yawen
Korea Open	Report	(China) Bao Chunlai	(China) Lu Lan	(United States) Tony Gunawan (Indonesia) Candra Wijaya	(China) Yang Wei (China) Zhang Jiewen	(Indonesia) Nova Widianto (Indonesia) Liliyana Natsir
Hong Kong Open	Report	(China) Lin Dan	(China) Xie Xingfang	(Indonesia) Markis Kido (Indonesia) Hendra Setiawan	(China) Yang Wei (China) Zhang Jiewen	(China) Zheng Bo (China) Zhao Tingting
China Open	Report	(China) Chen Hong	(China) Zhang Ning	(Indonesia) Markis Kido (Indonesia) Hendra Setiawan	(China) Yang Wei (China) Zhang Jiewen	(China) Xie Zhongbo (China) Zhang Yawen
5-stars
Singapore Open	Report	(Denmark) Peter Gade	(France) Pi Hongyan	(Indonesia) Sigit Budiarto (Indonesia) Flandy Limpele	(China) Yang Wei (China) Zhang Jiewen	(Indonesia) Nova Widianto (Indonesia) Liliyana Natsir
Chinese Taipei Open	Report	(China) Lin Dan	(China) Zhang Ning	(China) Cai Yun (China) Fu Haifeng	(South Korea) Lee Hyo-jung (South Korea) Lee Kyung-won	(Indonesia) Nova Widianto (Indonesia) Liliyana Natsir
Japan Open	Report	(China) Lin Dan	(China) Zhang Ning	(United States) Tony Gunawan (Indonesia) Candra Wijaya	(China) Gao Ling (China) Huang Sui	(Indonesia) Flandy Limpele (Indonesia) Vita Marissa
Denmark Open	Report	(China) Chen Hong	(China) Jiang Yanjiao	(Denmark) Lars Paaske (Denmark) Jonas Rasmussen	(Poland) Kamila Augustyn (Poland) Nadieżda Kostiuczyk	(England) Anthony Clark (England) Donna Kellogg
4-stars
Swiss Open	Report	(Malaysia) Lee Chong Wei	(Germany) Huaiwen Xu	(Malaysia) Chan Chong Ming (Malaysia) Koo Kien Keat	(China) Du Jing (China) Yu Yang	(England) Nathan Robertson (England) Gail Emms
All England Open	Report	(China) Lin Dan	(China) Xie Xingfang	(Denmark) Jens Eriksen (Denmark) Martin Lundgaard Hansen	(China) Gao Ling (China) Huang Sui	(China) Zhang Jun (China) Gao Ling
Philippines Open	Report	(Malaysia) Muhammad Hafiz Hashim	(India) Saina Nehwal	(Hong Kong) Albertus Susanto Njoto (Hong Kong) Yohan Hadikusumo Wiratama	(Indonesia) Jo Novita (Indonesia) Greysia Polii	(Thailand) Sudket Prapakamol (Thailand) Saralee Thungthongkam
Malaysia Open	Report	(Malaysia) Lee Chong Wei	(China) Zhang Ning	(Malaysia) Chan Chong Ming (Malaysia) Koo Kien Keat	(China) Gao Ling (China) Huang Sui	(China) Zhang Jun (China) Gao Ling
Macau Open	Report	(China) Lin Dan	(Netherlands) Judith Meulendijks	(China) Cai Yun (China) Fu Haifeng	(China) Gao Ling (China) Huang Sui	(Denmark) Thomas Laybourn (Denmark) Kamilla Rytter Juhl
3-stars
German Open	Report	(China) Chen Jin	(China) Zhang Ning	(South Korea) Jung Jae-sung (South Korea) Lee Yong-dae	(China) Yang Wei (China) Zhang Jiewen	(China) Zhang Jun (China) Gao Ling
Thailand Open	Report	(China) Chen Yu	(China) Zhu Lin	(South Korea) Jung Jae-sung (South Korea) Lee Yong-dae	(South Korea) Lee Hyo-jung (South Korea) Lee Kyung-won	(South Korea) Lee Yong-dae (South Korea) Hwang Yu-mi
2-stars
New Zealand Open	Report	(Malaysia) Lee Tsuen Seng	(Australia) Huang Chia-chi	(Indonesia) Eng Hian (Indonesia) Rian Sukmawan	(Singapore) Jiang Yanmei (Singapore) Li Yujia	(Singapore) Hendri Saputra (Singapore) Li Yujia
Bitburger Open	Report	(Singapore) Ronald Susilo	(Germany) Huaiwen Xu	(Poland) Michał Łogosz (Poland) Robert Mateusiak	(Singapore) Jiang Yanmei (Singapore) Li Yujia	(Poland) Robert Mateusiak (Poland) Nadieżda Kostiuczyk
Dutch Open	Report	(Malaysia) Sairul Amar Ayob	(Indonesia) Adriyanti Firdasari	(Indonesia) Eng Hian (Indonesia) Rian Sukmawan	(Indonesia) Rani Mundiasti (Indonesia) Endang Nursugianti	(England) Robert Blair (England) Jenny Wallwork
1-star
U.S. Open	Report	(Japan) Yousuke Nakanishi	(Russia) Ella Karachkova	(United States) Tony Gunawan (United States) Halim Haryanto	(Russia) Valeria Sorokina (Russia) Nina Vislova	(Russia) Sergey Ivlev (Russia) Nina Vislova
Vietnam Open	Report	(England) Andrew Smith	(South Korea) Bae Seung-hee	(South Korea) Jeon Jun-bum (South Korea) Yoo Yeon-seong	(South Korea) Kim Jin-ock (South Korea) Lee Jung-mi	(South Korea) Yoo Yeon-seong (South Korea) Lee Jung-mi
Bulgarian Open	Report	(Denmark) Kasper Ødum	(Bulgaria) Petya Nedelcheva	(Denmark) Mathias Boe (Denmark) Joachim Fischer Nielsen	(Indonesia) Meiliana Jauhari (Indonesia) Purwati	(Russia) Aleksandr Nikolaenko (Russia) Nina Vislova
Syed Modi International	Cancelled					

== Finals ==
=== January ===
Date	Tournament	Champions	Runners-up
3 – 8 January	Swiss Open (Draw): Host: Basel, Switzerland; Venue: St. Jakobshalle; Level: 4-stars; Prize: $120,000; Format: 56MS/32WS/32MD/32WD/32XD	(Malaysia) Lee Chong Wei	(China) Xia Xuanze
3 – 8 January	Swiss Open (Draw): Host: Basel, Switzerland; Venue: St. Jakobshalle; Level: 4-stars; Prize: $120,000; Format: 56MS/32WS/32MD/32WD/32XD	Score: 15–8, 15–0	
3 – 8 January	Swiss Open (Draw): Host: Basel, Switzerland; Venue: St. Jakobshalle; Level: 4-stars; Prize: $120,000; Format: 56MS/32WS/32MD/32WD/32XD	(Germany) Huaiwen Xu	(China) Zhu Lin
3 – 8 January	Swiss Open (Draw): Host: Basel, Switzerland; Venue: St. Jakobshalle; Level: 4-stars; Prize: $120,000; Format: 56MS/32WS/32MD/32WD/32XD	Score: 11–9, 11–4	
3 – 8 January	Swiss Open (Draw): Host: Basel, Switzerland; Venue: St. Jakobshalle; Level: 4-stars; Prize: $120,000; Format: 56MS/32WS/32MD/32WD/32XD	(Malaysia) Chan Chong Ming (Malaysia) Koo Kien Keat	(Denmark) Mathias Boe (Denmark) Carsten Mogensen
3 – 8 January	Swiss Open (Draw): Host: Basel, Switzerland; Venue: St. Jakobshalle; Level: 4-stars; Prize: $120,000; Format: 56MS/32WS/32MD/32WD/32XD	Score: 17–14, 8–15, 17–14	
3 – 8 January	Swiss Open (Draw): Host: Basel, Switzerland; Venue: St. Jakobshalle; Level: 4-stars; Prize: $120,000; Format: 56MS/32WS/32MD/32WD/32XD	(China) Du Jing (China) Yu Yang	(China) Zhang Dan (China) Zhao Tingting
3 – 8 January	Swiss Open (Draw): Host: Basel, Switzerland; Venue: St. Jakobshalle; Level: 4-stars; Prize: $120,000; Format: 56MS/32WS/32MD/32WD/32XD	Score: 15–5, 10–15, 15–11	
3 – 8 January	Swiss Open (Draw): Host: Basel, Switzerland; Venue: St. Jakobshalle; Level: 4-stars; Prize: $120,000; Format: 56MS/32WS/32MD/32WD/32XD	(England) Nathan Robertson (England) Gail Emms	(England) Robert Blair (England) Natalie Munt
3 – 8 January	Swiss Open (Draw): Host: Basel, Switzerland; Venue: St. Jakobshalle; Level: 4-stars; Prize: $120,000; Format: 56MS/32WS/32MD/32WD/32XD	Score: 14–17, 15–7, 15–2	
10 – 15 January	German Open (Draw): Host: Mülheim, Germany; Venue: RWE Rhein-Ruhr Sporthalle; Level: 3-stars; Prize: $80,000; Format: 64MS/32WS/32MD/32WD/32XD	(China) Chen Jin	(China) Chen Hong
10 – 15 January	German Open (Draw): Host: Mülheim, Germany; Venue: RWE Rhein-Ruhr Sporthalle; Level: 3-stars; Prize: $80,000; Format: 64MS/32WS/32MD/32WD/32XD	Score: 15–3, 15–7	
10 – 15 January	German Open (Draw): Host: Mülheim, Germany; Venue: RWE Rhein-Ruhr Sporthalle; Level: 3-stars; Prize: $80,000; Format: 64MS/32WS/32MD/32WD/32XD	(China) Zhang Ning	(China) Lu Lan
10 – 15 January	German Open (Draw): Host: Mülheim, Germany; Venue: RWE Rhein-Ruhr Sporthalle; Level: 3-stars; Prize: $80,000; Format: 64MS/32WS/32MD/32WD/32XD	Score: 11–8, 11–3	
10 – 15 January	German Open (Draw): Host: Mülheim, Germany; Venue: RWE Rhein-Ruhr Sporthalle; Level: 3-stars; Prize: $80,000; Format: 64MS/32WS/32MD/32WD/32XD	(South Korea) Jung Jae-sung (South Korea) Lee Yong-dae	(England) Robert Blair (England) Anthony Clark
10 – 15 January	German Open (Draw): Host: Mülheim, Germany; Venue: RWE Rhein-Ruhr Sporthalle; Level: 3-stars; Prize: $80,000; Format: 64MS/32WS/32MD/32WD/32XD	Score: 15–11, 15–6	
10 – 15 January	German Open (Draw): Host: Mülheim, Germany; Venue: RWE Rhein-Ruhr Sporthalle; Level: 3-stars; Prize: $80,000; Format: 64MS/32WS/32MD/32WD/32XD	(China) Yang Wei (China) Zhang Jiewen	(China) Gao Ling (China) Huang Sui
10 – 15 January	German Open (Draw): Host: Mülheim, Germany; Venue: RWE Rhein-Ruhr Sporthalle; Level: 3-stars; Prize: $80,000; Format: 64MS/32WS/32MD/32WD/32XD	Score: 3–15, 15–11, 15–10	
10 – 15 January	German Open (Draw): Host: Mülheim, Germany; Venue: RWE Rhein-Ruhr Sporthalle; Level: 3-stars; Prize: $80,000; Format: 64MS/32WS/32MD/32WD/32XD	(China) Zhang Jun (China) Gao Ling	(China) Xie Zhongbo (China) Zhang Yawen
10 – 15 January	German Open (Draw): Host: Mülheim, Germany; Venue: RWE Rhein-Ruhr Sporthalle; Level: 3-stars; Prize: $80,000; Format: 64MS/32WS/32MD/32WD/32XD	Score: 15–11, 15–12	
17 – 22 January	All England Open (Draw): Host: Birmingham, England; Venue: National Indoor Arena; Level: 4-stars; Prize: $125,000; Format: 64MS/48WS/48MD/32WD/32XD	(China) Lin Dan	(South Korea) Lee Hyun-il
17 – 22 January	All England Open (Draw): Host: Birmingham, England; Venue: National Indoor Arena; Level: 4-stars; Prize: $125,000; Format: 64MS/48WS/48MD/32WD/32XD	Score: 15–7, 15–7	
17 – 22 January	All England Open (Draw): Host: Birmingham, England; Venue: National Indoor Arena; Level: 4-stars; Prize: $125,000; Format: 64MS/48WS/48MD/32WD/32XD	(China) Xie Xingfang	(China) Zhang Ning
17 – 22 January	All England Open (Draw): Host: Birmingham, England; Venue: National Indoor Arena; Level: 4-stars; Prize: $125,000; Format: 64MS/48WS/48MD/32WD/32XD	Score: 11–6, 4–11, 11–2	
17 – 22 January	All England Open (Draw): Host: Birmingham, England; Venue: National Indoor Arena; Level: 4-stars; Prize: $125,000; Format: 64MS/48WS/48MD/32WD/32XD	(Denmark) Jens Eriksen (Denmark) Martin Lundgaard Hansen	(Malaysia) Choong Tan Fook (Malaysia) Lee Wan Wah
17 – 22 January	All England Open (Draw): Host: Birmingham, England; Venue: National Indoor Arena; Level: 4-stars; Prize: $125,000; Format: 64MS/48WS/48MD/32WD/32XD	Score: 15–6, 14–17, 15–2	
17 – 22 January	All England Open (Draw): Host: Birmingham, England; Venue: National Indoor Arena; Level: 4-stars; Prize: $125,000; Format: 64MS/48WS/48MD/32WD/32XD	(China) Gao Ling (China) Huang Sui	(China) Yang Wei (China) Zhang Jiewen
17 – 22 January	All England Open (Draw): Host: Birmingham, England; Venue: National Indoor Arena; Level: 4-stars; Prize: $125,000; Format: 64MS/48WS/48MD/32WD/32XD	Score: 15–11, 15–2	
17 – 22 January	All England Open (Draw): Host: Birmingham, England; Venue: National Indoor Arena; Level: 4-stars; Prize: $125,000; Format: 64MS/48WS/48MD/32WD/32XD	(China) Zhang Jun (China) Gao Ling	(England) Nathan Robertson (England) Gail Emms
17 – 22 January	All England Open (Draw): Host: Birmingham, England; Venue: National Indoor Arena; Level: 4-stars; Prize: $125,000; Format: 64MS/48WS/48MD/32WD/32XD	Score: 12–15, 17–14, 15–1	

=== March ===
Date	Tournament	Champions	Runners-up
8 - 12 March	China Masters (Draw): Host: Chengdu, China; Venue: Sichuan Gymnasium; Level: 6-stars; Prize: $250,000; Format: 32MS/32WS/24MD/16WD/24XD	(China) Chen Jin	(Denmark) Peter Gade
8 - 12 March	China Masters (Draw): Host: Chengdu, China; Venue: Sichuan Gymnasium; Level: 6-stars; Prize: $250,000; Format: 32MS/32WS/24MD/16WD/24XD	Score: 21–19, 21–14	
8 - 12 March	China Masters (Draw): Host: Chengdu, China; Venue: Sichuan Gymnasium; Level: 6-stars; Prize: $250,000; Format: 32MS/32WS/24MD/16WD/24XD	(China) Wang Lin	(China) Xie Xingfang
8 - 12 March	China Masters (Draw): Host: Chengdu, China; Venue: Sichuan Gymnasium; Level: 6-stars; Prize: $250,000; Format: 32MS/32WS/24MD/16WD/24XD	Score: 15–21, 21–13, 21–15	
8 - 12 March	China Masters (Draw): Host: Chengdu, China; Venue: Sichuan Gymnasium; Level: 6-stars; Prize: $250,000; Format: 32MS/32WS/24MD/16WD/24XD	(Denmark) Jens Eriksen (Denmark) Martin Lundgaard Hansen	(China) Cai Yun (China) Fu Haifeng
8 - 12 March	China Masters (Draw): Host: Chengdu, China; Venue: Sichuan Gymnasium; Level: 6-stars; Prize: $250,000; Format: 32MS/32WS/24MD/16WD/24XD	Score: 21–17, 21–17	
8 - 12 March	China Masters (Draw): Host: Chengdu, China; Venue: Sichuan Gymnasium; Level: 6-stars; Prize: $250,000; Format: 32MS/32WS/24MD/16WD/24XD	(China) Gao Ling (China) Huang Sui	(China) Wei Yili (China) Zhang Yawen
8 - 12 March	China Masters (Draw): Host: Chengdu, China; Venue: Sichuan Gymnasium; Level: 6-stars; Prize: $250,000; Format: 32MS/32WS/24MD/16WD/24XD	Score: 21–12, 18–21, 21–14	
8 - 12 March	China Masters (Draw): Host: Chengdu, China; Venue: Sichuan Gymnasium; Level: 6-stars; Prize: $250,000; Format: 32MS/32WS/24MD/16WD/24XD	(China) Xie Zhongbo (China) Zhang Yawen	(China) Zhang Jun (China) Gao Ling
8 - 12 March	China Masters (Draw): Host: Chengdu, China; Venue: Sichuan Gymnasium; Level: 6-stars; Prize: $250,000; Format: 32MS/32WS/24MD/16WD/24XD	Score: 21–16, 10–21, 22–20	

=== May ===
Date	Tournament	Champions	Runners-up
24 – 28 May	Philippines Open (Draw): Host: Manila, Philippines; Venue: PhilSports Arena; Level: 4-stars; Prize: $120,000; Format: 64MS/32WS/32MD/32WD/32XD	(Malaysia) Muhammad Hafiz Hashim	(Malaysia) Roslin Hashim
24 – 28 May	Philippines Open (Draw): Host: Manila, Philippines; Venue: PhilSports Arena; Level: 4-stars; Prize: $120,000; Format: 64MS/32WS/32MD/32WD/32XD	Score: 21–19, 21–7	
24 – 28 May	Philippines Open (Draw): Host: Manila, Philippines; Venue: PhilSports Arena; Level: 4-stars; Prize: $120,000; Format: 64MS/32WS/32MD/32WD/32XD	(India) Saina Nehwal	(Malaysia) Julia Wong Pei Xian
24 – 28 May	Philippines Open (Draw): Host: Manila, Philippines; Venue: PhilSports Arena; Level: 4-stars; Prize: $120,000; Format: 64MS/32WS/32MD/32WD/32XD	Score: 21–15, 22–20	
24 – 28 May	Philippines Open (Draw): Host: Manila, Philippines; Venue: PhilSports Arena; Level: 4-stars; Prize: $120,000; Format: 64MS/32WS/32MD/32WD/32XD	(Hong Kong) Albertus Susanto Njoto (Hong Kong) Yohan Hadikusumo Wiratama	(Indonesia) Hendra Aprida Gunawan (Indonesia) Joko Riyadi
24 – 28 May	Philippines Open (Draw): Host: Manila, Philippines; Venue: PhilSports Arena; Level: 4-stars; Prize: $120,000; Format: 64MS/32WS/32MD/32WD/32XD	Score: 18–21, 21–12, 21–19	
24 – 28 May	Philippines Open (Draw): Host: Manila, Philippines; Venue: PhilSports Arena; Level: 4-stars; Prize: $120,000; Format: 64MS/32WS/32MD/32WD/32XD	(Indonesia) Jo Novita (Indonesia) Greysia Polii	(Indonesia) Rani Mundiasti (Indonesia) Endang Nursugianti
24 – 28 May	Philippines Open (Draw): Host: Manila, Philippines; Venue: PhilSports Arena; Level: 4-stars; Prize: $120,000; Format: 64MS/32WS/32MD/32WD/32XD	Score: 21–16, 21–13	
24 – 28 May	Philippines Open (Draw): Host: Manila, Philippines; Venue: PhilSports Arena; Level: 4-stars; Prize: $120,000; Format: 64MS/32WS/32MD/32WD/32XD	(Thailand) Sudket Prapakamol (Thailand) Saralee Thungthongkam	(Philippines) Kennevic Asuncion (Philippines) Kennie Asuncion
24 – 28 May	Philippines Open (Draw): Host: Manila, Philippines; Venue: PhilSports Arena; Level: 4-stars; Prize: $120,000; Format: 64MS/32WS/32MD/32WD/32XD	Score: 21–18, 21–16	
29 May – 4 June	Indonesia Open (Draw): Host: Surabaya, Indonesia; Venue: GOR Kertajaya; Level: 6-stars; Prize: $250,000; Format: 64MS/32WS/32MD/32WD/32XD	(Indonesia) Taufik Hidayat	(China) Bao Chunlai
29 May – 4 June	Indonesia Open (Draw): Host: Surabaya, Indonesia; Venue: GOR Kertajaya; Level: 6-stars; Prize: $250,000; Format: 64MS/32WS/32MD/32WD/32XD	Score: 21–18, 21–19	
29 May – 4 June	Indonesia Open (Draw): Host: Surabaya, Indonesia; Venue: GOR Kertajaya; Level: 6-stars; Prize: $250,000; Format: 64MS/32WS/32MD/32WD/32XD	(China) Zhu Lin	(China) Lu Lan
29 May – 4 June	Indonesia Open (Draw): Host: Surabaya, Indonesia; Venue: GOR Kertajaya; Level: 6-stars; Prize: $250,000; Format: 64MS/32WS/32MD/32WD/32XD	Score: 21–11, 21–16	
29 May – 4 June	Indonesia Open (Draw): Host: Surabaya, Indonesia; Venue: GOR Kertajaya; Level: 6-stars; Prize: $250,000; Format: 64MS/32WS/32MD/32WD/32XD	(United States) Tony Gunawan (Indonesia) Candra Wijaya	(Indonesia) Markis Kido (Indonesia) Hendra Setiawan
29 May – 4 June	Indonesia Open (Draw): Host: Surabaya, Indonesia; Venue: GOR Kertajaya; Level: 6-stars; Prize: $250,000; Format: 64MS/32WS/32MD/32WD/32XD	Score: 21–17, 21–16	
29 May – 4 June	Indonesia Open (Draw): Host: Surabaya, Indonesia; Venue: GOR Kertajaya; Level: 6-stars; Prize: $250,000; Format: 64MS/32WS/32MD/32WD/32XD	(China) Wei Yili (China) Zhang Yawen	(China) Yang Wei (China) Zhang Jiewen
29 May – 4 June	Indonesia Open (Draw): Host: Surabaya, Indonesia; Venue: GOR Kertajaya; Level: 6-stars; Prize: $250,000; Format: 64MS/32WS/32MD/32WD/32XD	Score: 21–11, 21–16	
29 May – 4 June	Indonesia Open (Draw): Host: Surabaya, Indonesia; Venue: GOR Kertajaya; Level: 6-stars; Prize: $250,000; Format: 64MS/32WS/32MD/32WD/32XD	(China) Xie Zhongbo (China) Zhang Yawen	(Indonesia) Nova Widianto (Indonesia) Liliyana Natsir
29 May – 4 June	Indonesia Open (Draw): Host: Surabaya, Indonesia; Venue: GOR Kertajaya; Level: 6-stars; Prize: $250,000; Format: 64MS/32WS/32MD/32WD/32XD	Score: 21–19, 21–15	

=== June ===
Date	Tournament	Champions	Runners-up
6 – 11 June	Singapore Open (Draw): Host: Singapore; Venue: Singapore Indoor Stadium; Level: 5-stars; Prize: $170,000; Format: 64MS/32WS/32MD/32WD/32XD	(Denmark) Peter Gade	(Denmark) Kenneth Jonassen
6 – 11 June	Singapore Open (Draw): Host: Singapore; Venue: Singapore Indoor Stadium; Level: 5-stars; Prize: $170,000; Format: 64MS/32WS/32MD/32WD/32XD	Score: 21–10, 21–14	
6 – 11 June	Singapore Open (Draw): Host: Singapore; Venue: Singapore Indoor Stadium; Level: 5-stars; Prize: $170,000; Format: 64MS/32WS/32MD/32WD/32XD	(France) Pi Hongyan	(Netherlands) Mia Audina
6 – 11 June	Singapore Open (Draw): Host: Singapore; Venue: Singapore Indoor Stadium; Level: 5-stars; Prize: $170,000; Format: 64MS/32WS/32MD/32WD/32XD	Score: 22–20, 22–20	
6 – 11 June	Singapore Open (Draw): Host: Singapore; Venue: Singapore Indoor Stadium; Level: 5-stars; Prize: $170,000; Format: 64MS/32WS/32MD/32WD/32XD	(Indonesia) Sigit Budiarto (Indonesia) Flandy Limpele	(Denmark) Thomas Laybourn (Denmark) Lars Paaske
6 – 11 June	Singapore Open (Draw): Host: Singapore; Venue: Singapore Indoor Stadium; Level: 5-stars; Prize: $170,000; Format: 64MS/32WS/32MD/32WD/32XD	Score: 21–8, 21–16	
6 – 11 June	Singapore Open (Draw): Host: Singapore; Venue: Singapore Indoor Stadium; Level: 5-stars; Prize: $170,000; Format: 64MS/32WS/32MD/32WD/32XD	(China) Yang Wei (China) Zhang Jiewen	(China) Zhang Dan (China) Zhao Tingting
6 – 11 June	Singapore Open (Draw): Host: Singapore; Venue: Singapore Indoor Stadium; Level: 5-stars; Prize: $170,000; Format: 64MS/32WS/32MD/32WD/32XD	Score: 21–18, 21–18	
6 – 11 June	Singapore Open (Draw): Host: Singapore; Venue: Singapore Indoor Stadium; Level: 5-stars; Prize: $170,000; Format: 64MS/32WS/32MD/32WD/32XD	(Indonesia) Nova Widianto (Indonesia) Liliyana Natsir	(England) Nathan Robertson (England) Gail Emms
6 – 11 June	Singapore Open (Draw): Host: Singapore; Venue: Singapore Indoor Stadium; Level: 5-stars; Prize: $170,000; Format: 64MS/32WS/32MD/32WD/32XD	Score: 21–16, 20–22, 23–21	
13 – 18 June	Malaysia Open (Draw): Host: Kuching, Malaysia; Venue: Stadium Perpaduan; Level: 4-stars; Prize: $125,000; Format: 64MS/32WS/32MD/32WD/32XD	(Malaysia) Lee Chong Wei	(China) Lin Dan
13 – 18 June	Malaysia Open (Draw): Host: Kuching, Malaysia; Venue: Stadium Perpaduan; Level: 4-stars; Prize: $125,000; Format: 64MS/32WS/32MD/32WD/32XD	Score: 21–18, 18–21, 23–21	
13 – 18 June	Malaysia Open (Draw): Host: Kuching, Malaysia; Venue: Stadium Perpaduan; Level: 4-stars; Prize: $125,000; Format: 64MS/32WS/32MD/32WD/32XD	(China) Zhang Ning	(England) Tracey Hallam
13 – 18 June	Malaysia Open (Draw): Host: Kuching, Malaysia; Venue: Stadium Perpaduan; Level: 4-stars; Prize: $125,000; Format: 64MS/32WS/32MD/32WD/32XD	Score: 21–12, 21–13	
13 – 18 June	Malaysia Open (Draw): Host: Kuching, Malaysia; Venue: Stadium Perpaduan; Level: 4-stars; Prize: $125,000; Format: 64MS/32WS/32MD/32WD/32XD	(Malaysia) Chan Chong Ming (Malaysia) Koo Kien Keat	(Malaysia) Robert Lin Woon Fui (Malaysia) Mohd Fairuzizuan Mohd Tazari
13 – 18 June	Malaysia Open (Draw): Host: Kuching, Malaysia; Venue: Stadium Perpaduan; Level: 4-stars; Prize: $125,000; Format: 64MS/32WS/32MD/32WD/32XD	Score: 14–21, 21–11, 21–17	
13 – 18 June	Malaysia Open (Draw): Host: Kuching, Malaysia; Venue: Stadium Perpaduan; Level: 4-stars; Prize: $125,000; Format: 64MS/32WS/32MD/32WD/32XD	(China) Gao Ling (China) Huang Sui	(China) Du Jing (China) Yu Yang
13 – 18 June	Malaysia Open (Draw): Host: Kuching, Malaysia; Venue: Stadium Perpaduan; Level: 4-stars; Prize: $125,000; Format: 64MS/32WS/32MD/32WD/32XD	Score: 9–21, 21–16, 21–17	
13 – 18 June	Malaysia Open (Draw): Host: Kuching, Malaysia; Venue: Stadium Perpaduan; Level: 4-stars; Prize: $125,000; Format: 64MS/32WS/32MD/32WD/32XD	(China) Zhang Jun (China) Gao Ling	(Denmark) Jonas Rasmussen (Denmark) Britta Andersen
13 – 18 June	Malaysia Open (Draw): Host: Kuching, Malaysia; Venue: Stadium Perpaduan; Level: 4-stars; Prize: $125,000; Format: 64MS/32WS/32MD/32WD/32XD	Score: 19–21, 21–14, 21–15	
20 – 25 June	Chinese Taipei Open (Draw): Host: Taipei, Taiwan; Venue: Taipei Physical Education Indoor Stadium; Level: 5-stars; Prize: $170,000; Format: 64MS/32WS/32MD/32WD/32XD	(China) Lin Dan	(Malaysia) Lee Chong Wei
20 – 25 June	Chinese Taipei Open (Draw): Host: Taipei, Taiwan; Venue: Taipei Physical Education Indoor Stadium; Level: 5-stars; Prize: $170,000; Format: 64MS/32WS/32MD/32WD/32XD	Score: 21–18, 12–21, 21–11	
20 – 25 June	Chinese Taipei Open (Draw): Host: Taipei, Taiwan; Venue: Taipei Physical Education Indoor Stadium; Level: 5-stars; Prize: $170,000; Format: 64MS/32WS/32MD/32WD/32XD	(China) Zhang Ning	(China) Xie Xingfang
20 – 25 June	Chinese Taipei Open (Draw): Host: Taipei, Taiwan; Venue: Taipei Physical Education Indoor Stadium; Level: 5-stars; Prize: $170,000; Format: 64MS/32WS/32MD/32WD/32XD	Score: 21–15, 21–15	
20 – 25 June	Chinese Taipei Open (Draw): Host: Taipei, Taiwan; Venue: Taipei Physical Education Indoor Stadium; Level: 5-stars; Prize: $170,000; Format: 64MS/32WS/32MD/32WD/32XD	(China) Cai Yun (China) Fu Haifeng	(South Korea) Jung Jae-sung (South Korea) Lee Yong-dae
20 – 25 June	Chinese Taipei Open (Draw): Host: Taipei, Taiwan; Venue: Taipei Physical Education Indoor Stadium; Level: 5-stars; Prize: $170,000; Format: 64MS/32WS/32MD/32WD/32XD	Score: 21–14, 21–18	
20 – 25 June	Chinese Taipei Open (Draw): Host: Taipei, Taiwan; Venue: Taipei Physical Education Indoor Stadium; Level: 5-stars; Prize: $170,000; Format: 64MS/32WS/32MD/32WD/32XD	(South Korea) Lee Hyo-jung (South Korea) Lee Kyung-won	(China) Gao Ling (China) Huang Sui
20 – 25 June	Chinese Taipei Open (Draw): Host: Taipei, Taiwan; Venue: Taipei Physical Education Indoor Stadium; Level: 5-stars; Prize: $170,000; Format: 64MS/32WS/32MD/32WD/32XD	Score: 21–18, 9–21, 21–17	
20 – 25 June	Chinese Taipei Open (Draw): Host: Taipei, Taiwan; Venue: Taipei Physical Education Indoor Stadium; Level: 5-stars; Prize: $170,000; Format: 64MS/32WS/32MD/32WD/32XD	(Indonesia) Nova Widianto (Indonesia) Liliyana Natsir	(South Korea) Lee Jae-jin (South Korea) Lee Hyo-jung
20 – 25 June	Chinese Taipei Open (Draw): Host: Taipei, Taiwan; Venue: Taipei Physical Education Indoor Stadium; Level: 5-stars; Prize: $170,000; Format: 64MS/32WS/32MD/32WD/32XD	Score: 17–21, 23–21, 21–13	

=== July ===
Date	Tournament	Champions	Runners-up
19 – 23 July	Macau Open (Draw): Host: Macau; Venue: Tap Seac Multi-sports Pavilion; Level: 4-stars; Prize: $120,000; Format: 64MS/32WS/32MD/32WD/32XD	(China) Lin Dan	(Malaysia) Lee Chong Wei
19 – 23 July	Macau Open (Draw): Host: Macau; Venue: Tap Seac Multi-sports Pavilion; Level: 4-stars; Prize: $120,000; Format: 64MS/32WS/32MD/32WD/32XD	Score: 21–18, 18–21, 21–18	
19 – 23 July	Macau Open (Draw): Host: Macau; Venue: Tap Seac Multi-sports Pavilion; Level: 4-stars; Prize: $120,000; Format: 64MS/32WS/32MD/32WD/32XD	(Netherlands) Judith Meulendijks	(Hong Kong) Yip Pui Yin
19 – 23 July	Macau Open (Draw): Host: Macau; Venue: Tap Seac Multi-sports Pavilion; Level: 4-stars; Prize: $120,000; Format: 64MS/32WS/32MD/32WD/32XD	Score: 19–21, 21–16, 21–19	
19 – 23 July	Macau Open (Draw): Host: Macau; Venue: Tap Seac Multi-sports Pavilion; Level: 4-stars; Prize: $120,000; Format: 64MS/32WS/32MD/32WD/32XD	(China) Cai Yun (China) Fu Haifeng	(China) Guo Zhendong (China) Zheng Bo
19 – 23 July	Macau Open (Draw): Host: Macau; Venue: Tap Seac Multi-sports Pavilion; Level: 4-stars; Prize: $120,000; Format: 64MS/32WS/32MD/32WD/32XD	Score: 21–12, 9–21, 21–19	
19 – 23 July	Macau Open (Draw): Host: Macau; Venue: Tap Seac Multi-sports Pavilion; Level: 4-stars; Prize: $120,000; Format: 64MS/32WS/32MD/32WD/32XD	(China) Gao Ling (China) Huang Sui	(South Korea) Lee Hyo-jung (South Korea) Lee Kyung-won
19 – 23 July	Macau Open (Draw): Host: Macau; Venue: Tap Seac Multi-sports Pavilion; Level: 4-stars; Prize: $120,000; Format: 64MS/32WS/32MD/32WD/32XD	Score: 17–21, 21–14, 21–14	
19 – 23 July	Macau Open (Draw): Host: Macau; Venue: Tap Seac Multi-sports Pavilion; Level: 4-stars; Prize: $120,000; Format: 64MS/32WS/32MD/32WD/32XD	(Denmark) Thomas Laybourn (Denmark) Kamilla Rytter Juhl	(China) Zhang Jun (China) Gao Ling
19 – 23 July	Macau Open (Draw): Host: Macau; Venue: Tap Seac Multi-sports Pavilion; Level: 4-stars; Prize: $120,000; Format: 64MS/32WS/32MD/32WD/32XD	Score: 21–19, 22–20	
25 – 30 July	Thailand Open (Draw): Host: Bangkok, Thailand; Venue: Indoor Stadium Huamark; Level: 3-stars; Prize: $80,000; Format: 64MS/32WS/32MD/32WD/32XD	(China) Chen Yu	(China) Chen Jin
25 – 30 July	Thailand Open (Draw): Host: Bangkok, Thailand; Venue: Indoor Stadium Huamark; Level: 3-stars; Prize: $80,000; Format: 64MS/32WS/32MD/32WD/32XD	Score: 21–17, 21–23, 22–20	
25 – 30 July	Thailand Open (Draw): Host: Bangkok, Thailand; Venue: Indoor Stadium Huamark; Level: 3-stars; Prize: $80,000; Format: 64MS/32WS/32MD/32WD/32XD	(China) Zhu Lin	(South Korea) Hwang Hye-youn
25 – 30 July	Thailand Open (Draw): Host: Bangkok, Thailand; Venue: Indoor Stadium Huamark; Level: 3-stars; Prize: $80,000; Format: 64MS/32WS/32MD/32WD/32XD	Score: 21–13, 18–21, 21–15	
25 – 30 July	Thailand Open (Draw): Host: Bangkok, Thailand; Venue: Indoor Stadium Huamark; Level: 3-stars; Prize: $80,000; Format: 64MS/32WS/32MD/32WD/32XD	(South Korea) Jung Jae-sung (South Korea) Lee Yong-dae	(South Korea) Lee Jae-jin (South Korea) Hwang Ji-man
25 – 30 July	Thailand Open (Draw): Host: Bangkok, Thailand; Venue: Indoor Stadium Huamark; Level: 3-stars; Prize: $80,000; Format: 64MS/32WS/32MD/32WD/32XD	Score: Walkover	
25 – 30 July	Thailand Open (Draw): Host: Bangkok, Thailand; Venue: Indoor Stadium Huamark; Level: 3-stars; Prize: $80,000; Format: 64MS/32WS/32MD/32WD/32XD	(South Korea) Lee Hyo-jung (South Korea) Lee Kyung-won	(Thailand) Sathinee Chankrachangwong (Thailand) Saralee Thungthongkam
25 – 30 July	Thailand Open (Draw): Host: Bangkok, Thailand; Venue: Indoor Stadium Huamark; Level: 3-stars; Prize: $80,000; Format: 64MS/32WS/32MD/32WD/32XD	Score: 21–18, 21–9	
25 – 30 July	Thailand Open (Draw): Host: Bangkok, Thailand; Venue: Indoor Stadium Huamark; Level: 3-stars; Prize: $80,000; Format: 64MS/32WS/32MD/32WD/32XD	(South Korea) Lee Yong-dae (South Korea) Hwang Yu-mi	(Thailand) Sudket Prapakamol (Thailand) Saralee Thungthongkam
25 – 30 July	Thailand Open (Draw): Host: Bangkok, Thailand; Venue: Indoor Stadium Huamark; Level: 3-stars; Prize: $80,000; Format: 64MS/32WS/32MD/32WD/32XD	Score: 21–11, 18–21, 22–20	

=== August ===
Date	Tournament	Champions	Runners-up
1 – 6 August	New Zealand Open (Draw): Host: Auckland, New Zealand; Venue: Auckland Badminton Hall; Level: 2-stars; Prize: $50,000; Format: 48MS/48WS/32MD/32WD/32XD	(Malaysia) Lee Tsuen Seng	(Singapore) Ronald Susilo
1 – 6 August	New Zealand Open (Draw): Host: Auckland, New Zealand; Venue: Auckland Badminton Hall; Level: 2-stars; Prize: $50,000; Format: 48MS/48WS/32MD/32WD/32XD	Score: 21–18, 21–13	
1 – 6 August	New Zealand Open (Draw): Host: Auckland, New Zealand; Venue: Auckland Badminton Hall; Level: 2-stars; Prize: $50,000; Format: 48MS/48WS/32MD/32WD/32XD	(Australia) Huang Chia-chi	(Singapore) Xing Aiying
1 – 6 August	New Zealand Open (Draw): Host: Auckland, New Zealand; Venue: Auckland Badminton Hall; Level: 2-stars; Prize: $50,000; Format: 48MS/48WS/32MD/32WD/32XD	Score: 21–18, 22–24, 21–15	
1 – 6 August	New Zealand Open (Draw): Host: Auckland, New Zealand; Venue: Auckland Badminton Hall; Level: 2-stars; Prize: $50,000; Format: 48MS/48WS/32MD/32WD/32XD	(Indonesia) Eng Hian (Indonesia) Rian Sukmawan	(Singapore) Hendri Saputra (Singapore) Hendra Wijaya
1 – 6 August	New Zealand Open (Draw): Host: Auckland, New Zealand; Venue: Auckland Badminton Hall; Level: 2-stars; Prize: $50,000; Format: 48MS/48WS/32MD/32WD/32XD	Score: 21–13, 11–9 Retired	
1 – 6 August	New Zealand Open (Draw): Host: Auckland, New Zealand; Venue: Auckland Badminton Hall; Level: 2-stars; Prize: $50,000; Format: 48MS/48WS/32MD/32WD/32XD	(Singapore) Jiang Yanmei (Singapore) Li Yujia	(Malaysia) Lim Pek Siah (Malaysia) Joanne Quay
1 – 6 August	New Zealand Open (Draw): Host: Auckland, New Zealand; Venue: Auckland Badminton Hall; Level: 2-stars; Prize: $50,000; Format: 48MS/48WS/32MD/32WD/32XD	Score: 21–11, 19–21, 21–15	
1 – 6 August	New Zealand Open (Draw): Host: Auckland, New Zealand; Venue: Auckland Badminton Hall; Level: 2-stars; Prize: $50,000; Format: 48MS/48WS/32MD/32WD/32XD	(Singapore) Hendri Saputra (Singapore) Li Yujia	(Singapore) Hendra Wijaya (Singapore) Frances Liu
1 – 6 August	New Zealand Open (Draw): Host: Auckland, New Zealand; Venue: Auckland Badminton Hall; Level: 2-stars; Prize: $50,000; Format: 48MS/48WS/32MD/32WD/32XD	Score: 21–11, 21–12	
8 – 13 August	U.S. Open (Draw): Host: Orange, California, United States; Venue: Orange County Badminton Club; Level: 1-star; Prize: $30,000; Format: 32MS/32WS/32MD/32WD/32XD	(Japan) Yousuke Nakanishi	(Canada) Andrew Dabeka
8 – 13 August	U.S. Open (Draw): Host: Orange, California, United States; Venue: Orange County Badminton Club; Level: 1-star; Prize: $30,000; Format: 32MS/32WS/32MD/32WD/32XD	Score: 21–16, 21–13	
8 – 13 August	U.S. Open (Draw): Host: Orange, California, United States; Venue: Orange County Badminton Club; Level: 1-star; Prize: $30,000; Format: 32MS/32WS/32MD/32WD/32XD	(Russia) Ella Karachkova	(United States) Lee Joo-hyun
8 – 13 August	U.S. Open (Draw): Host: Orange, California, United States; Venue: Orange County Badminton Club; Level: 1-star; Prize: $30,000; Format: 32MS/32WS/32MD/32WD/32XD	Score: 11–6 Retired	
8 – 13 August	U.S. Open (Draw): Host: Orange, California, United States; Venue: Orange County Badminton Club; Level: 1-star; Prize: $30,000; Format: 32MS/32WS/32MD/32WD/32XD	(United States) Tony Gunawan (United States) Halim Haryanto	(Russia) Vitalij Durkin (Russia) Aleksandr Nikolaenko
8 – 13 August	U.S. Open (Draw): Host: Orange, California, United States; Venue: Orange County Badminton Club; Level: 1-star; Prize: $30,000; Format: 32MS/32WS/32MD/32WD/32XD	Score: 21–10, 21–19	
8 – 13 August	U.S. Open (Draw): Host: Orange, California, United States; Venue: Orange County Badminton Club; Level: 1-star; Prize: $30,000; Format: 32MS/32WS/32MD/32WD/32XD	(Russia) Valeria Sorokina (Russia) Nina Vislova	(Russia) Ella Karachkova (Russia) Marina Yakusheva
8 – 13 August	U.S. Open (Draw): Host: Orange, California, United States; Venue: Orange County Badminton Club; Level: 1-star; Prize: $30,000; Format: 32MS/32WS/32MD/32WD/32XD	Score: 21–15, 21–18	
8 – 13 August	U.S. Open (Draw): Host: Orange, California, United States; Venue: Orange County Badminton Club; Level: 1-star; Prize: $30,000; Format: 32MS/32WS/32MD/32WD/32XD	(Russia) Sergey Ivlev (Russia) Nina Vislova	(Russia) Vitalij Durkin (Russia) Valeria Sorokina
8 – 13 August	U.S. Open (Draw): Host: Orange, California, United States; Venue: Orange County Badminton Club; Level: 1-star; Prize: $30,000; Format: 32MS/32WS/32MD/32WD/32XD	Score: 15–21, 21–15, 21–13	
21 – 27 August	Korea Open (Draw): Host: Seoul, South Korea; Venue: Jangchung Gymnasium; Level: 6-star; Prize: $300,000; Format: 64MS/64WS/32MD/32WD/32XD	(China) Bao Chunlai	(Malaysia) Roslin Hashim
21 – 27 August	Korea Open (Draw): Host: Seoul, South Korea; Venue: Jangchung Gymnasium; Level: 6-star; Prize: $300,000; Format: 64MS/64WS/32MD/32WD/32XD	Score: 21–18, 21–16	
21 – 27 August	Korea Open (Draw): Host: Seoul, South Korea; Venue: Jangchung Gymnasium; Level: 6-star; Prize: $300,000; Format: 64MS/64WS/32MD/32WD/32XD	(China) Lu Lan	(China) Zhu Lin
21 – 27 August	Korea Open (Draw): Host: Seoul, South Korea; Venue: Jangchung Gymnasium; Level: 6-star; Prize: $300,000; Format: 64MS/64WS/32MD/32WD/32XD	Score: 21–18, 21–11	
21 – 27 August	Korea Open (Draw): Host: Seoul, South Korea; Venue: Jangchung Gymnasium; Level: 6-star; Prize: $300,000; Format: 64MS/64WS/32MD/32WD/32XD	(United States) Tony Gunawan (Indonesia) Candra Wijaya	(South Korea) Lee Jae-jin (South Korea) Hwang Ji-man
21 – 27 August	Korea Open (Draw): Host: Seoul, South Korea; Venue: Jangchung Gymnasium; Level: 6-star; Prize: $300,000; Format: 64MS/64WS/32MD/32WD/32XD	Score: 21–18, 21–18	
21 – 27 August	Korea Open (Draw): Host: Seoul, South Korea; Venue: Jangchung Gymnasium; Level: 6-star; Prize: $300,000; Format: 64MS/64WS/32MD/32WD/32XD	(China) Yang Wei (China) Zhang Jiewen	(Indonesia) Jo Novita (Indonesia) Greysia Polii
21 – 27 August	Korea Open (Draw): Host: Seoul, South Korea; Venue: Jangchung Gymnasium; Level: 6-star; Prize: $300,000; Format: 64MS/64WS/32MD/32WD/32XD	Score: 21–10, 21–11	
21 – 27 August	Korea Open (Draw): Host: Seoul, South Korea; Venue: Jangchung Gymnasium; Level: 6-star; Prize: $300,000; Format: 64MS/64WS/32MD/32WD/32XD	(Indonesia) Nova Widianto (Indonesia) Liliyana Natsir	(Denmark) Jens Eriksen (Denmark) Mette Schjoldager
21 – 27 August	Korea Open (Draw): Host: Seoul, South Korea; Venue: Jangchung Gymnasium; Level: 6-star; Prize: $300,000; Format: 64MS/64WS/32MD/32WD/32XD	Score: 23–21, 21–18	
28 August – 2 September	Hong Kong Open (Draw): Host: Hong Kong; Venue: Queen Elizabeth Stadium; Level: 6-star; Prize: $250,000; Format: 64MS/32WS/32MD/32WD/32XD	(China) Lin Dan	(Malaysia) Lee Chong Wei
28 August – 2 September	Hong Kong Open (Draw): Host: Hong Kong; Venue: Queen Elizabeth Stadium; Level: 6-star; Prize: $250,000; Format: 64MS/32WS/32MD/32WD/32XD	Score: 21–19, 8–21, 21–16	
28 August – 2 September	Hong Kong Open (Draw): Host: Hong Kong; Venue: Queen Elizabeth Stadium; Level: 6-star; Prize: $250,000; Format: 64MS/32WS/32MD/32WD/32XD	(China) Xie Xingfang	(China) Zhang Ning
28 August – 2 September	Hong Kong Open (Draw): Host: Hong Kong; Venue: Queen Elizabeth Stadium; Level: 6-star; Prize: $250,000; Format: 64MS/32WS/32MD/32WD/32XD	Score: Walkover	
28 August – 2 September	Hong Kong Open (Draw): Host: Hong Kong; Venue: Queen Elizabeth Stadium; Level: 6-star; Prize: $250,000; Format: 64MS/32WS/32MD/32WD/32XD	(Indonesia) Markis Kido (Indonesia) Hendra Setiawan	(Malaysia) Choong Tan Fook (Malaysia) Lee Wan Wah
28 August – 2 September	Hong Kong Open (Draw): Host: Hong Kong; Venue: Queen Elizabeth Stadium; Level: 6-star; Prize: $250,000; Format: 64MS/32WS/32MD/32WD/32XD	Score: 22–24, 21–16, 22–20	
28 August – 2 September	Hong Kong Open (Draw): Host: Hong Kong; Venue: Queen Elizabeth Stadium; Level: 6-star; Prize: $250,000; Format: 64MS/32WS/32MD/32WD/32XD	(China) Yang Wei (China) Zhang Jiewen	(China) Gao Ling (China) Huang Sui
28 August – 2 September	Hong Kong Open (Draw): Host: Hong Kong; Venue: Queen Elizabeth Stadium; Level: 6-star; Prize: $250,000; Format: 64MS/32WS/32MD/32WD/32XD	Score: 21–19, 15–21, 21–19	
28 August – 2 September	Hong Kong Open (Draw): Host: Hong Kong; Venue: Queen Elizabeth Stadium; Level: 6-star; Prize: $250,000; Format: 64MS/32WS/32MD/32WD/32XD	(China) Zheng Bo (China) Zhao Tingting	(Indonesia) Nova Widianto (Indonesia) Liliyana Natsir
28 August – 2 September	Hong Kong Open (Draw): Host: Hong Kong; Venue: Queen Elizabeth Stadium; Level: 6-star; Prize: $250,000; Format: 64MS/32WS/32MD/32WD/32XD	Score: 22–20, 21–19	

=== October ===
Date	Tournament	Champions	Runners-up
10 – 15 October	Japan Open (Draw): Host: Tokyo, Japan; Venue: Yoyogi National Gymnasium; Level: 5-stars; Prize: $180,000; Format: 48MS/48WS/32MD/32WD/32XD	(China) Lin Dan	(Indonesia) Taufik Hidayat
10 – 15 October	Japan Open (Draw): Host: Tokyo, Japan; Venue: Yoyogi National Gymnasium; Level: 5-stars; Prize: $180,000; Format: 48MS/48WS/32MD/32WD/32XD	Score: 16–21, 21–16, 21–3	
10 – 15 October	Japan Open (Draw): Host: Tokyo, Japan; Venue: Yoyogi National Gymnasium; Level: 5-stars; Prize: $180,000; Format: 48MS/48WS/32MD/32WD/32XD	(China) Zhang Ning	(China) Xie Xingfang
10 – 15 October	Japan Open (Draw): Host: Tokyo, Japan; Venue: Yoyogi National Gymnasium; Level: 5-stars; Prize: $180,000; Format: 48MS/48WS/32MD/32WD/32XD	Score: 21–11, 16–21, 30–29	
10 – 15 October	Japan Open (Draw): Host: Tokyo, Japan; Venue: Yoyogi National Gymnasium; Level: 5-stars; Prize: $180,000; Format: 48MS/48WS/32MD/32WD/32XD	(United States) Tony Gunawan (Indonesia) Candra Wijaya	(Malaysia) Koo Kien Keat (Malaysia) Tan Boon Heong
10 – 15 October	Japan Open (Draw): Host: Tokyo, Japan; Venue: Yoyogi National Gymnasium; Level: 5-stars; Prize: $180,000; Format: 48MS/48WS/32MD/32WD/32XD	Score: 21–15, 21–14	
10 – 15 October	Japan Open (Draw): Host: Tokyo, Japan; Venue: Yoyogi National Gymnasium; Level: 5-stars; Prize: $180,000; Format: 48MS/48WS/32MD/32WD/32XD	(China) Gao Ling (China) Huang Sui	(China) Wei Yili (China) Zhang Yawen
10 – 15 October	Japan Open (Draw): Host: Tokyo, Japan; Venue: Yoyogi National Gymnasium; Level: 5-stars; Prize: $180,000; Format: 48MS/48WS/32MD/32WD/32XD	Score: 21–15, 21–17	
10 – 15 October	Japan Open (Draw): Host: Tokyo, Japan; Venue: Yoyogi National Gymnasium; Level: 5-stars; Prize: $180,000; Format: 48MS/48WS/32MD/32WD/32XD	(Indonesia) Flandy Limpele (Indonesia) Vita Marissa	(Indonesia) Nova Widianto (Indonesia) Liliyana Natsir
10 – 15 October	Japan Open (Draw): Host: Tokyo, Japan; Venue: Yoyogi National Gymnasium; Level: 5-stars; Prize: $180,000; Format: 48MS/48WS/32MD/32WD/32XD	Score: 11–21, 21–18, 21–17	
17 – 22 October	China Open (Draw): Host: Guangzhou, China; Venue: Tianhe Gymnasium; Level: 6-star; Prize: $250,000; Format: 48MS/48WS/32MD/32WD/32XD	(China) Chen Hong	(China) Bao Chunlai
17 – 22 October	China Open (Draw): Host: Guangzhou, China; Venue: Tianhe Gymnasium; Level: 6-star; Prize: $250,000; Format: 48MS/48WS/32MD/32WD/32XD	Score: 21–17, 21–19	
17 – 22 October	China Open (Draw): Host: Guangzhou, China; Venue: Tianhe Gymnasium; Level: 6-star; Prize: $250,000; Format: 48MS/48WS/32MD/32WD/32XD	(China) Zhang Ning	(Netherlands) Yao Jie
17 – 22 October	China Open (Draw): Host: Guangzhou, China; Venue: Tianhe Gymnasium; Level: 6-star; Prize: $250,000; Format: 48MS/48WS/32MD/32WD/32XD	Score: 21–14, 21–5	
17 – 22 October	China Open (Draw): Host: Guangzhou, China; Venue: Tianhe Gymnasium; Level: 6-star; Prize: $250,000; Format: 48MS/48WS/32MD/32WD/32XD	(Indonesia) Markis Kido (Indonesia) Hendra Setiawan	(China) Cai Yun (China) Fu Haifeng
17 – 22 October	China Open (Draw): Host: Guangzhou, China; Venue: Tianhe Gymnasium; Level: 6-star; Prize: $250,000; Format: 48MS/48WS/32MD/32WD/32XD	Score: 21–16, 21–16	
17 – 22 October	China Open (Draw): Host: Guangzhou, China; Venue: Tianhe Gymnasium; Level: 6-star; Prize: $250,000; Format: 48MS/48WS/32MD/32WD/32XD	(China) Yang Wei (China) Zhang Jiewen	(China) Wei Yili (China) Zhang Yawen
17 – 22 October	China Open (Draw): Host: Guangzhou, China; Venue: Tianhe Gymnasium; Level: 6-star; Prize: $250,000; Format: 48MS/48WS/32MD/32WD/32XD	Score: 21–17, 21–7	
17 – 22 October	China Open (Draw): Host: Guangzhou, China; Venue: Tianhe Gymnasium; Level: 6-star; Prize: $250,000; Format: 48MS/48WS/32MD/32WD/32XD	(China) Xie Zhongbo (China) Zhang Yawen	(China) Xu Chen (China) Zhao Tingting
17 – 22 October	China Open (Draw): Host: Guangzhou, China; Venue: Tianhe Gymnasium; Level: 6-star; Prize: $250,000; Format: 48MS/48WS/32MD/32WD/32XD	Score: 21–19, 21–5	
24 – 29 October	Bitburger Open (Draw): Host: Saarbrücken, Germany; Venue: Saarlandhalle; Level: 2-star; Prize: $50,000; Format: 64MS/64WS/32MD/32WD/32XD	(Singapore) Ronald Susilo	(Singapore) Kendrick Lee
24 – 29 October	Bitburger Open (Draw): Host: Saarbrücken, Germany; Venue: Saarlandhalle; Level: 2-star; Prize: $50,000; Format: 64MS/64WS/32MD/32WD/32XD	Score: 21–11, 21–16	
24 – 29 October	Bitburger Open (Draw): Host: Saarbrücken, Germany; Venue: Saarlandhalle; Level: 2-star; Prize: $50,000; Format: 64MS/64WS/32MD/32WD/32XD	(Germany) Huaiwen Xu	(Indonesia) Maria Kristin Yulianti
24 – 29 October	Bitburger Open (Draw): Host: Saarbrücken, Germany; Venue: Saarlandhalle; Level: 2-star; Prize: $50,000; Format: 64MS/64WS/32MD/32WD/32XD	Score: 21–17, 21–17	
24 – 29 October	Bitburger Open (Draw): Host: Saarbrücken, Germany; Venue: Saarlandhalle; Level: 2-star; Prize: $50,000; Format: 64MS/64WS/32MD/32WD/32XD	(Poland) Michał Łogosz (Poland) Robert Mateusiak	(Indonesia) Hendra Aprida Gunawan (Indonesia) Joko Riyadi
24 – 29 October	Bitburger Open (Draw): Host: Saarbrücken, Germany; Venue: Saarlandhalle; Level: 2-star; Prize: $50,000; Format: 64MS/64WS/32MD/32WD/32XD	Score: 21–13, 21–13	
24 – 29 October	Bitburger Open (Draw): Host: Saarbrücken, Germany; Venue: Saarlandhalle; Level: 2-star; Prize: $50,000; Format: 64MS/64WS/32MD/32WD/32XD	(Singapore) Jiang Yanmei (Singapore) Li Yujia	(Indonesia) Endang Nursugianti (Indonesia) Rani Mundiasti
24 – 29 October	Bitburger Open (Draw): Host: Saarbrücken, Germany; Venue: Saarlandhalle; Level: 2-star; Prize: $50,000; Format: 64MS/64WS/32MD/32WD/32XD	Score: 21–12, 21–15	
24 – 29 October	Bitburger Open (Draw): Host: Saarbrücken, Germany; Venue: Saarlandhalle; Level: 2-star; Prize: $50,000; Format: 64MS/64WS/32MD/32WD/32XD	(Poland) Robert Mateusiak (Poland) Nadieżda Kostiuczyk	(Singapore) Hendri Saputra (Singapore) Li Yujia
24 – 29 October	Bitburger Open (Draw): Host: Saarbrücken, Germany; Venue: Saarlandhalle; Level: 2-star; Prize: $50,000; Format: 64MS/64WS/32MD/32WD/32XD	Score: 22–24, 21–16, 21–8	
31 October – 5 November	Denmark Open (Draw): Host: Aarhus, Denmark; Venue: Atletion NRGi Arena; Level: 5-star; Prize: $170,000; Format: 64MS/32WS/32MD/32WD/32XD	(China) Chen Hong	(China) Chen Yu
31 October – 5 November	Denmark Open (Draw): Host: Aarhus, Denmark; Venue: Atletion NRGi Arena; Level: 5-star; Prize: $170,000; Format: 64MS/32WS/32MD/32WD/32XD	Score: 21–18, 21–18	
31 October – 5 November	Denmark Open (Draw): Host: Aarhus, Denmark; Venue: Atletion NRGi Arena; Level: 5-star; Prize: $170,000; Format: 64MS/32WS/32MD/32WD/32XD	(China) Jiang Yanjiao	(China) Lu Lan
31 October – 5 November	Denmark Open (Draw): Host: Aarhus, Denmark; Venue: Atletion NRGi Arena; Level: 5-star; Prize: $170,000; Format: 64MS/32WS/32MD/32WD/32XD	Score: 21–14, 21–14	
31 October – 5 November	Denmark Open (Draw): Host: Aarhus, Denmark; Venue: Atletion NRGi Arena; Level: 5-star; Prize: $170,000; Format: 64MS/32WS/32MD/32WD/32XD	(Denmark) Lars Paaske (Denmark) Jonas Rasmussen	(Denmark) Mathias Boe (Denmark) Joachim Fischer Nielsen
31 October – 5 November	Denmark Open (Draw): Host: Aarhus, Denmark; Venue: Atletion NRGi Arena; Level: 5-star; Prize: $170,000; Format: 64MS/32WS/32MD/32WD/32XD	Score: 18–21, 21–10, 21–17	
31 October – 5 November	Denmark Open (Draw): Host: Aarhus, Denmark; Venue: Atletion NRGi Arena; Level: 5-star; Prize: $170,000; Format: 64MS/32WS/32MD/32WD/32XD	(Poland) Kamila Augustyn (Poland) Nadieżda Kostiuczyk	(England) Gail Emms (England) Donna Kellogg
31 October – 5 November	Denmark Open (Draw): Host: Aarhus, Denmark; Venue: Atletion NRGi Arena; Level: 5-star; Prize: $170,000; Format: 64MS/32WS/32MD/32WD/32XD	Score: 22–20, 21–10	
31 October – 5 November	Denmark Open (Draw): Host: Aarhus, Denmark; Venue: Atletion NRGi Arena; Level: 5-star; Prize: $170,000; Format: 64MS/32WS/32MD/32WD/32XD	(England) Anthony Clark (England) Donna Kellogg	(Denmark) Thomas Laybourn (Denmark) Kamilla Rytter Juhl
31 October – 5 November	Denmark Open (Draw): Host: Aarhus, Denmark; Venue: Atletion NRGi Arena; Level: 5-star; Prize: $170,000; Format: 64MS/32WS/32MD/32WD/32XD	Score: 14–21, 21–14, 22–20	

=== November ===
Date	Tournament	Champions	Runners-up
7 – 12 November	Dutch Open (Draw): Host: 's-Hertogenbosch, Netherlands; Venue: Maaspoort; Level: 2-stars; Prize: $50,000; Format: 48MS/48WS/32MD/32WD/32XD	(Malaysia) Sairul Amar Ayob	(China) Wu Yunyong
7 – 12 November	Dutch Open (Draw): Host: 's-Hertogenbosch, Netherlands; Venue: Maaspoort; Level: 2-stars; Prize: $50,000; Format: 48MS/48WS/32MD/32WD/32XD	Score: 22–20, 14–21, 21–9	
7 – 12 November	Dutch Open (Draw): Host: 's-Hertogenbosch, Netherlands; Venue: Maaspoort; Level: 2-stars; Prize: $50,000; Format: 48MS/48WS/32MD/32WD/32XD	(Indonesia) Adriyanti Firdasari	(China) Li Wenyan
7 – 12 November	Dutch Open (Draw): Host: 's-Hertogenbosch, Netherlands; Venue: Maaspoort; Level: 2-stars; Prize: $50,000; Format: 48MS/48WS/32MD/32WD/32XD	Score: 21–16, 21–19	
7 – 12 November	Dutch Open (Draw): Host: 's-Hertogenbosch, Netherlands; Venue: Maaspoort; Level: 2-stars; Prize: $50,000; Format: 48MS/48WS/32MD/32WD/32XD	(Indonesia) Eng Hian (Indonesia) Rian Sukmawan	(Indonesia) Hendra Aprida Gunawan (Indonesia) Joko Riyadi
7 – 12 November	Dutch Open (Draw): Host: 's-Hertogenbosch, Netherlands; Venue: Maaspoort; Level: 2-stars; Prize: $50,000; Format: 48MS/48WS/32MD/32WD/32XD	Score: 21–15, 21–10	
7 – 12 November	Dutch Open (Draw): Host: 's-Hertogenbosch, Netherlands; Venue: Maaspoort; Level: 2-stars; Prize: $50,000; Format: 48MS/48WS/32MD/32WD/32XD	(Indonesia) Rani Mundiasti (Indonesia) Endang Nursugianti	(Germany) Michaela Peiffer (Germany) Kathrin Piotrowski
7 – 12 November	Dutch Open (Draw): Host: 's-Hertogenbosch, Netherlands; Venue: Maaspoort; Level: 2-stars; Prize: $50,000; Format: 48MS/48WS/32MD/32WD/32XD	Score: 21–16, 21–16	
7 – 12 November	Dutch Open (Draw): Host: 's-Hertogenbosch, Netherlands; Venue: Maaspoort; Level: 2-stars; Prize: $50,000; Format: 48MS/48WS/32MD/32WD/32XD	(England) Robert Blair (England) Jenny Wallwork	(Indonesia) Flandy Limpele (Indonesia) Vita Marissa
7 – 12 November	Dutch Open (Draw): Host: 's-Hertogenbosch, Netherlands; Venue: Maaspoort; Level: 2-stars; Prize: $50,000; Format: 48MS/48WS/32MD/32WD/32XD	Score: 21–18, 21–18	
14 – 19 November	Vietnam Open (Draw): Host: Ho Chi Minh City, Vietnam; Venue: Phan Dinh Phung Indoor Stadium; Level: 1-star; Prize: $30,000; Format: 48MS/48WS/32MD/32WD/32XD	(England) Andrew Smith	(Malaysia) Ismail Saman
14 – 19 November	Vietnam Open (Draw): Host: Ho Chi Minh City, Vietnam; Venue: Phan Dinh Phung Indoor Stadium; Level: 1-star; Prize: $30,000; Format: 48MS/48WS/32MD/32WD/32XD	Score: 21–14, 12–21, 21–19	
14 – 19 November	Vietnam Open (Draw): Host: Ho Chi Minh City, Vietnam; Venue: Phan Dinh Phung Indoor Stadium; Level: 1-star; Prize: $30,000; Format: 48MS/48WS/32MD/32WD/32XD	(South Korea) Bae Seung-hee	(Malaysia) Anita Raj Kaur
14 – 19 November	Vietnam Open (Draw): Host: Ho Chi Minh City, Vietnam; Venue: Phan Dinh Phung Indoor Stadium; Level: 1-star; Prize: $30,000; Format: 48MS/48WS/32MD/32WD/32XD	Score: 21–8, 21–18	
14 – 19 November	Vietnam Open (Draw): Host: Ho Chi Minh City, Vietnam; Venue: Phan Dinh Phung Indoor Stadium; Level: 1-star; Prize: $30,000; Format: 48MS/48WS/32MD/32WD/32XD	(South Korea) Jeon Jun-bum (South Korea) Yoo Yeon-seong	(Malaysia) Chew Choon Eng (Malaysia) Hong Chieng Hun
14 – 19 November	Vietnam Open (Draw): Host: Ho Chi Minh City, Vietnam; Venue: Phan Dinh Phung Indoor Stadium; Level: 1-star; Prize: $30,000; Format: 48MS/48WS/32MD/32WD/32XD	Score: 21–19, 21–19	
14 – 19 November	Vietnam Open (Draw): Host: Ho Chi Minh City, Vietnam; Venue: Phan Dinh Phung Indoor Stadium; Level: 1-star; Prize: $30,000; Format: 48MS/48WS/32MD/32WD/32XD	(South Korea) Kim Jin-ock (South Korea) Lee Jung-mi	(South Korea) Bae Seung-hee (South Korea) Kang Joo-young
14 – 19 November	Vietnam Open (Draw): Host: Ho Chi Minh City, Vietnam; Venue: Phan Dinh Phung Indoor Stadium; Level: 1-star; Prize: $30,000; Format: 48MS/48WS/32MD/32WD/32XD	Score: 22–20, 21–14	
14 – 19 November	Vietnam Open (Draw): Host: Ho Chi Minh City, Vietnam; Venue: Phan Dinh Phung Indoor Stadium; Level: 1-star; Prize: $30,000; Format: 48MS/48WS/32MD/32WD/32XD	(South Korea) Yoo Yeon-seong (South Korea) Lee Jung-mi	(South Korea) Kang Myeong-won (South Korea) Kang Joo-yong
14 – 19 November	Vietnam Open (Draw): Host: Ho Chi Minh City, Vietnam; Venue: Phan Dinh Phung Indoor Stadium; Level: 1-star; Prize: $30,000; Format: 48MS/48WS/32MD/32WD/32XD	Score: 21–17, 17–21, 21–18	

=== December ===
Date	Tournament	Champions	Runners-up
6 – 10 December	Bulgarian Open (Draw): Host: Sofia, Bulgaria; Venue: Sports Hall Sofia; Level: 1-stars; Prize: $30,000; Format: 64MS/32WS/32MD/32WD/32XD	(Denmark) Kasper Ødum	(Malaysia) Lee Tsuen Seng
6 – 10 December	Bulgarian Open (Draw): Host: Sofia, Bulgaria; Venue: Sports Hall Sofia; Level: 1-stars; Prize: $30,000; Format: 64MS/32WS/32MD/32WD/32XD	Score: 17–21, 23–21, 21–19	
6 – 10 December	Bulgarian Open (Draw): Host: Sofia, Bulgaria; Venue: Sports Hall Sofia; Level: 1-stars; Prize: $30,000; Format: 64MS/32WS/32MD/32WD/32XD	(Bulgaria) Petya Nedelcheva	(Russia) Ella Karachkova
6 – 10 December	Bulgarian Open (Draw): Host: Sofia, Bulgaria; Venue: Sports Hall Sofia; Level: 1-stars; Prize: $30,000; Format: 64MS/32WS/32MD/32WD/32XD	Score: 19–21, 21–19, 21–16	
6 – 10 December	Bulgarian Open (Draw): Host: Sofia, Bulgaria; Venue: Sports Hall Sofia; Level: 1-stars; Prize: $30,000; Format: 64MS/32WS/32MD/32WD/32XD	(Denmark) Mathias Boe (Denmark) Joachim Fischer Nielsen	(Denmark) Simon Mollyhus (Denmark) Anders Kristiansen
6 – 10 December	Bulgarian Open (Draw): Host: Sofia, Bulgaria; Venue: Sports Hall Sofia; Level: 1-stars; Prize: $30,000; Format: 64MS/32WS/32MD/32WD/32XD	Score: 18–21, 21–18, 25–23	
6 – 10 December	Bulgarian Open (Draw): Host: Sofia, Bulgaria; Venue: Sports Hall Sofia; Level: 1-stars; Prize: $30,000; Format: 64MS/32WS/32MD/32WD/32XD	(Indonesia) Meiliana Jauhari (Indonesia) Purwati	(Russia) Valeria Sorokina (Russia) Nina Vislova
6 – 10 December	Bulgarian Open (Draw): Host: Sofia, Bulgaria; Venue: Sports Hall Sofia; Level: 1-stars; Prize: $30,000; Format: 64MS/32WS/32MD/32WD/32XD	Score: 21–10, 21–9	
6 – 10 December	Bulgarian Open (Draw): Host: Sofia, Bulgaria; Venue: Sports Hall Sofia; Level: 1-stars; Prize: $30,000; Format: 64MS/32WS/32MD/32WD/32XD	(Russia) Aleksandr Nikolaenko (Russia) Nina Vislova	(Denmark) Mikkel Delbo Larsen (Denmark) Mie Schjøtt-Kristensen
6 – 10 December	Bulgarian Open (Draw): Host: Sofia, Bulgaria; Venue: Sports Hall Sofia; Level: 1-stars; Prize: $30,000; Format: 64MS/32WS/32MD/32WD/32XD	Score: 22–20, 22–20	

== Statistics ==
=== Performance by countries ===
Below are the 2006 IBF World Grand Prix performances by countries. Only countries who have won a title are listed:

Rank	Team	6*					5*				4*					3*		2*			1*			Total
Rank	Team	CHN	INA	KOR	HKG	CHN	SIN	TPE	JPN	DEN	SUI	ENG	PHI	MAS	MAC	GER	THA	NZL	GER	NED	USA	VIE	BUL	Total
1	China	4	3	3	4	4	1	3	3	2	1	4		3	3	4	2							44
2	Indonesia		1.5	1.5	1	1	2	1	1.5				1					1		3			1	15.5
3	South Korea							1								1	3					4		9
4	Denmark	1					1			1		1			1								2	7
5	Malaysia										2		1	2				1		1				7
6	England									1	1									1		1		4
7	Singapore																	2	2					4
8	Russia																				3		1	4
9	Poland									1									2					3
10	United States		0.5	0.5					0.5												1			2.5
11	Germany										1								1					2
12	France						1																	1
13	Hong Kong												1											1
13	India												1											1
13	Netherlands														1									1
13	Thailand												1											1
17	Australia																	1						1
18	Bulgaria																						1	1
18	Japan																				1			1

=== Performance by categories ===
==== Men's singles ====
Rank	Players	6*	5*	4*	3*	2*	1*	Total
1	(China) Lin Dan	1	2	2				5
2	(China) Chen Hong	1	1					2
3	(China) Chen Jin	1			1			2
4	(Malaysia) Lee Chong Wei			2				2
5	(China) Bao Chunlai	1						1
5	(Indonesia) Taufik Hidayat	1						1
7	(Denmark) Peter Gade		1					1
8	(Malaysia) Muhammad Hafiz Hashim			1				1
9	(China) Chen Yu				1			1
10	(Malaysia) Lee Tsuen Seng					1		1
10	(Malaysia) Sairul Amar Ayob					1		1
10	(Singapore) Ronald Susilo					1		1
13	(Denmark) Kasper Ødum						1	1
13	(England) Andrew Smith						1	1
13	(Japan) Yousuke Nakanishi						1	1

==== Women's singles ====
Rank	Players	6*	5*	4*	3*	2*	1*	Total
1	(China) Zhang Ning	1	2	1	1			4
2	(China) Xie Xingfang	1		1				2
3	(China) Zhu Lin	1			1			2
4	(Germany) Huaiwen Xu			1		1		2
5	(China) Lu Lan	1						1
5	(China) Wang Lin	1						1
7	(China) Jiang Yanjiao		1					1
7	(France) Pi Hongyan		1					1
9	(India) Saina Nehwal			1				1
9	(Netherlands) Judith Meulendijks			1				1
11	(Australia) Huang Chia-chi					1		1
11	(Indonesia) Adriyanti Firdasari					1		1
13	(Bulgaria) Petya Nedelcheva						1	1
13	(Russia) Ella Karachkova						1	1
13	(South Korea) Bae Seung-hee						1	1

==== Men's doubles ====
Rank	Players	6*	5*	4*	3*	2*	1*	Total
1	(United States) Tony Gunawan	2	1				1	4
2	(Indonesia) Candra Wijaya	2	1					3
3	(Indonesia) Hendra Setiawan	2						2
3	(Indonesia) Markis Kido	2						2
5	(Denmark) Jens Eriksen	1		1				2
5	(Denmark) Martin Lundgaard Hansen	1		1				2
7	(China) Cai Yun		1	1				2
7	(China) Fu Haifeng		1	1				2
9	(Malaysia) Chan Chong Ming			2				2
9	(Malaysia) Koo Kien Keat			2				2
11	(South Korea) Jung Jae-sung				2			2
11	(South Korea) Lee Yong-dae				2			2
13	(Indonesia) Eng Hian					2		2
13	(Indonesia) Rian Sukmawan					2		2
15	(Denmark) Jonas Rasmussen		1					1
15	(Denmark) Lars Paaske		1					1
15	(Indonesia) Flandy Limpele		1					1
15	(Indonesia) Sigit Budiarto		1					1
19	(Hong Kong) Albertus Susanto Njoto			1				1
19	(Hong Kong) Yohan Hadikusumo Wiratama			1				1
21	(Poland) Michał Łogosz					1		1
21	(Poland) Robert Mateusiak					1		1
23	(Denmark) Mathias Boe						1	1
23	(Denmark) Joachim Fischer Nielsen						1	1
23	(South Korea) Jeon Jun-bum						1	1
23	(South Korea) Yoo Yeon-seong						1	1
23	(United States) Halim Haryanto						1	1

==== Women's doubles ====
Rank	Players	6*	5*	4*	3*	2*	1*	Total
1	(China) Yang Wei	3	1		1			5
1	(China) Zhang Jiewen	3	1		1			5
3	(China) Gao Ling	1	1	3				5
3	(China) Huang Sui	1	1	3				5
5	(South Korea) Lee Hyo-jung		1		1			2
5	(South Korea) Lee Kyung-won		1		1			2
7	(Singapore) Jiang Yanmei					2		2
7	(Singapore) Li Yujia					2		2
9	(China) Wei Yili	1						1
9	(China) Zhang Yawen	1						1
11	(Poland) Kamila Augustyn		1					1
11	(Poland) Nadieżda Kostiuczyk		1					1
13	(China) Du Jing			1				1
13	(China) Yu Yang			1				1
13	(Indonesia) Jo Novita			1				1
13	(Indonesia) Greysia Polii			1				1
17	(Indonesia) Endang Nursugianti					1		1
17	(Indonesia) Rani Mundiasti					1		1
19	(Indonesia) Meiliana Jauhari						1	1
19	(Indonesia) Purwati						1	1
19	(Russia) Nina Vislova						1	1
19	(Russia) Valeria Sorokina						1	1
19	(South Korea) Kim Jin-ock						1	1
19	(South Korea) Lee Jung-mi						1	1

==== Mixed doubles ====
Rank	Players	6*	5*	4*	3*	2*	1*	Total
1	(China) Xie Zhongbo	3						3
1	(China) Zhang Yawen	3						3
3	(Indonesia) Nova Widianto	1	2					3
3	(Indonesia) Liliyana Natsir	1	2					3
5	(China) Gao Ling			2	1			3
5	(China) Zhang Jun			2	1			3
7	(Russia) Nina Vislova						2	2
8	(China) Zhao Tingting	1						1
8	(China) Zheng Bo	1						1
10	(Indonesia) Flandy Limpele		1					1
10	(Indonesia) Vita Marissa		1					1
10	(England) Anthony Clark		1					1
10	(England) Donna Kellogg		1					1
14	(Denmark) Kamilla Rytter Juhl			1				1
14	(Denmark) Thomas Laybourn			1				1
14	(England) Nathan Robertson			1				1
14	(England) Gail Emms			1				1
14	(Thailand) Saralee Thungthongkam			1				1
14	(Thailand) Sudket Prapakamol			1				1
20	(South Korea) Hwang Yu-mi				1			1
20	(South Korea) Lee Yong-dae				1			1
22	(England) Robert Blair					1		1
22	(England) Jenny Wallwork					1		1
22	(Singapore) Hendri Saputra					1		1
22	(Singapore) Li Yujia					1		1
22	(Poland) Nadieżda Kostiuczyk					1		1
22	(Poland) Robert Mateusiak					1		1
28	(Russia) Aleksandr Nikolaenko						1	1
28	(Russia) Sergey Ivlev						1	1
28	(South Korea) Lee Jung-mi						1	1
28	(South Korea) Yoo Yeon-seong						1	1
