= 2006 Philippines Open =

Tournament details
- Dates: 24 May 2006 – 28 May 2006
- Edition: 1st
- Level: World Grand Prix 4 Stars
- Total prize money: US$120,000
- Venue: PhilSports Arena
- Location: Manila, Philippines

Champions
- Men's singles: (Malaysia) Muhammad Hafiz Hashim
- Women's singles: (India) Saina Nehwal
- Men's doubles: (Hong Kong) Albertus Susanto Njoto (Hong Kong) Yohan Hadikusumo Wiratama
- Women's doubles: (Indonesia) Jo Novita (Indonesia) Greysia Polii
- Mixed doubles: (Thailand) Sudket Prapakamol (Thailand) Saralee Thungthongkam

The 2006 Philippines Open (officially known as the Bingo Bonanza Philippines Open 2006 for sponsorship reasons) was badminton tournament which took place at the PhilSports Arena in Manila, Philippines, on from 24 to 28 May 2006 and had a total purse of $120,000.

== Tournament ==
The 2006 All England Open was the fifth tournament of the 2006 IBF World Grand Prix and also the inaugural tournament of the Philippines Open championships. The tournament was originally scheduled from 1 to 5 March, changed to May due to the state of emergency in the Philippines.

=== Venue ===
This international tournament was held at PhilSports Arena in Manila, Philippines.

=== Point distribution ===
Below is the point distribution table for each phase of the tournament based on the IBF points system for the IBF World Grand Prix 4-star event.

Winner	Runner-up	3/4	5/8	9/16	17/32	33/64
4,200	3,570	2,940	2,310	1,680	1,050	420

=== Prize pool ===
The total prize money for this tournament was US$120,000. The distribution of the prize money was in accordance with IBF regulations.

Event	Winner	Finalist	Semi-finals	Quarter-finals	Last 16
Men's singles	$9,600	$4,800	$2,400	$1,200	$480
Women's singles	$8,280	$3,960	$2,160	$1,080	—N/a
Men's doubles	$8,640	$4,800	$2,880	$1,680	—N/a
Women's doubles	$7,320	$4,800	$2,640	$1,320	—N/a
Mixed doubles	$7,320	$4,800	$2,640	$1,320	—N/a

== Men’s singles ==
=== Seeds ===
1. (Malaysia) Muhammad Hafiz Hashim (champion)
2. (Hong Kong) Ng Wei (semi-finals)
3. (Thailand) Boonsak Ponsana (semi-finals)
4. (Malaysia) Kuan Beng Hong (third round)
5. (Hong Kong) Chan Yan Kit (quarter-finals)
6. (England) Andrew Smith (quarter-finals)
7. (India) Chetan Anand (third round)
8. (Malaysia) Sairul Amar Ayob (quarter-finals)
9. (Singapore) Kendrick Lee Yen Hui (third round)
10. (Malaysia) Lee Tsuen Seng (third round)
11. (Indonesia) Jeffer Rosobin (second round)
12. (Malaysia) Yogendran Khrishnan (third round)
13. (Hong Kong) Agus Hariyanto (first round)
14. (Vietnam) Nguyễn Tiến Minh (quarter-finals)
15. (Thailand) Poompat Sapkulchananart (second round)
16. (Malaysia) Pei Wei Chung (first round)

=== Finals ===
Semi-finals
1	(Malaysia) Muhammad Hafiz Hashim	21	21
3/4	(Thailand) Boonsak Ponsana	19	13
(Malaysia) Roslin Hashim	21	21
2	(Hong Kong) Ng Wei	15	19

Final
1	(Malaysia) Muhammad Hafiz Hashim	21	21
(Malaysia) Roslin Hashim	19	7

=== Top half ===
==== Section 1 ====
First Round
(Philippines) O Lopez	8	4
(Vietnam) Nguyễn Q M	21	21
9/16	(Singapore) K Lee Y H	21	21
(Hong Kong) Hung Y W	18	13
(India) A Sridhar	14	21	22
(Philippines) R Bartolome	21	8	20
(Philippines) K Asuncion	21	21
(Macau) Lo I W	8	13
9/16	(Malaysia) Lee T S	21	21
(Philippines) W Frias	2	5
(Japan) Y Shinkai	16	16
(United States) R Rai	21	21

Second Round
1	(Malaysia) M H Hashim	16	21	21
(Vietnam) Nguyễn Q M	21	17	11
9/16	(Singapore) K Lee Y H	20	21	21
(India) A Sridhar	22	19	19
5/8	(Hong Kong) Chan Y K	21	21
(Philippines) K Asuncion	18	15
9/16	(Malaysia) Lee T S	21	22
(United States) R Rai	11	20

Third Round
1	(Malaysia) M H Hashim	21	21
9/16	(Singapore) K Lee Y H	14	13
5/8	(Hong Kong) Chan Y K	8	21	21
9/16	(Malaysia) Lee T S	21	18	10

Quarter-finals
1	(Malaysia) M H Hashim	21	21
5/8	(Hong Kong) Chan Y K	9	10

==== Section 2 ====
First Round
(Philippines) A Amahit Jr.	25	14	8
(India) A Pawar	23	21	21
9/16	(Indonesia) J Rosobin	21	21
(Philippines) B J Garcia	10	12
(Malaysia) J Chua	21	21
(Canada) K Holoboff	6	8
5/8	(England) A Smith	21	21
(Philippines) M A Narividad	8	12
(Hong Kong) Wong W H	21	21
(Malaysia) Z Abdullah	7	16
9/16	(Malaysia) Y Khrishnan	21	21
(Macau) Chan I C	10	15
(Philippines) W Fernandez	11	22	11
(Denmark) B Rafn	21	20	21

Second Round
3/4	(Thailand) B Ponsana	21	22
(India) A Pawar	15	20
9/16	(Indonesia) J Rosobin	17	16
(Malaysia) J Chua	21	21
5/8	(England) A Smith	21	21
(Hong Kong) Wong W H	9	16
9/16	(Malaysia) Y Khrishnan	21	21
(Denmark) B Rafn	19	11

Third Round
3/4	(Thailand) B Ponsana	21	21
(Malaysia) J Chua	8	12
5/8	(England) A Smith	21	21
9/16	(Malaysia) Y Khrishnan	11	13

Quarter-finals
3/4	(Thailand) B Ponsana	21	21
5/8	(England) A Smith	12	10

=== Bottom half ===
==== Section 3 ====
First Round
(Malaysia) R Hashim	21	21
(Philippines) K Ang	3	13
(Macau) Ho C L	7	8
9/16	(Hong Kong) A Hariyanto	21	21
(Malaysia) S Ismail	22	21	21
(Philippines) L Escoses	24	7	12
(Japan) J Takemura	19	13
5/8	(India) C Anand	21	21
(United States) E Go	21	14	14
(Indonesia) M Wijanu	14	21	21
(Malaysia) L Hew	9	2
9/16	(Vietnam) Nguyễn T M	21	21
(Philippines) A Mailon	13	12
(India) Parupalli K	21	21

Second Round
(Malaysia) R Hashim	21	18	21
9/16	(Hong Kong) A Hariyanto	9	21	15
(Malaysia) S Ismail	21	8	19
5/8	(India) C Anand	19	21	21
(Indonesia) M Wijanu	10	16
9/16	(Vietnam) Nguyễn T M	21	21
(India) Parupalli K	11	16
3/4	(Malaysia) Kuan B H	21	21

Third Round
(Malaysia) R Hashim	21	22	21
5/8	(India) C Anand	18	24	8
9/16	(Vietnam) Nguyễn T M	21	20	22
3/4	(Malaysia) Kuan B H	17	22	20

Quarter-finals
(Malaysia) R Hashim	21	21
9/16	(Vietnam) Nguyễn T M	9	15

==== Section 4 ====
First Round
(Japan) S Ōtsuka	21	21
(Philippines) M Villrin	10	9
(India) R Castelino	5	14
9/16	(Thailand) P Sapkulchananart	21	21
(United States) R Sou	16	16
(Canada) R Liang	21	21
(Macau) Kou K S	3	4
(Philippines) J Junio	21	21
(India) A Bhat	22	21
9/16	(Malaysia) Pei W C	20	17
(Philippines) C Flores	14	11
(Italy) K Raffeiner	21	21

Second Round
(Japan) S Ōtsuka	13	15
9/16	(Thailand) P Sapkulchananart	21	21
(Canada) R Liang	4	7
5/8	(Malaysia) S A Ayob	21	21
(Philippines) J Junio	16	13
(India) A Bhat	21	21
(Italy) K Raffeiner	14	21	7
2	(Hong Kong) Ng W	21	16	2

Third Round
9/16	(Thailand) P Sapkulchananart	23	10	18
5/8	(Malaysia) S A Ayob	21	21	21
(India) A Bhat	13	11
2	(Hong Kong) Ng W	21	21

Quarter-finals
9/16	(Malaysia) S A Ayob	21	12	13
2	(Hong Kong) Ng W	16	21	21

== Women’s singles ==
=== Seeds ===
1. (Germany) Huaiwen Xu (quarter-finals)
2. (Hong Kong) Yip Pui Yin (quarter-finals)
3. (Thailand) Salakjit Ponsana (second round)
4. (Finland) Anu Nieminen (quarter-finals)
5. (Malaysia) Sutheaswari Mudukasan (first round)
6. (Canada) Anna Rice (first round)
7. (Italy) Agnese Allegrini (first round)
8. (Malaysia) Julia Wong Pei Xian (final)

=== Finals ===
Semi-finals
(India) Saina Nehwal	21	20	21
(Japan) Ai Goto	19	22	14
(Japan) Chie Umezu	17	14
5/8	(Malaysia) Julia Wong Pei Xian	21	21

Final
(India) Saina Nehwal	21	22
5/8	(Malaysia) Julia Wong Pei Xian	15	20

=== Top half ===
==== Section 1 ====
First Round
(Philippines) I Chiu	21	21
(Macau) Pun S P	5	4
5/8	(Malaysia) S Mudukasan	16	19
(India) S Nehwal	21	21
(Hong Kong) Wong S Y	6	11
(Japan) S Imai	21	21

Second Round
1	(Germany) HW Xu	21	21
(Philippines) I Chiu	13	11
(India) S Nehwal	21	21
(Japan) S Imai	15	14

Quarter-finals
(Germany) HW Xu	21	17	17
(India) S Nehwal	12	21	21

==== Section 2 ====
First Round
3/4	(Thailand) S Ponsana	21	21
(Hong Kong) Ng K S	12	13
(Malaysia) N Baharum	16	18
(Indonesia) F Ratnasari	21	21
5/8	(Canada) A Rice	21	20	16
(India) S Gokhale	16	22	21
(Japan) A Goto	21	21
(United States) J Coleman	7	6

Second Round
3/4	(Thailand) S Ponsana	11	18
(Indonesia) F Ratnasari	21	21
(India) S Gokhale	14	13
(Japan) A Goto	21	21

Quarter-finals
(Indonesia) F Ratnasari	12	21	17
(Japan) A Goto	21	18	21

=== Bottom half ===
==== Section 3 ====
First Round
(India) R Missha	15	14
(Malaysia) A R Kaur	21	21
(Japan) C Umezu	21	21
5/8	(Italy) A Allegrini	8	13
(Philippines) K Velez	21	21
(Macau) Lao I M	12	9
(United States) E Lee	21	17	3
3/4	(Finland) A Nieminen	19	21	21

Second Round
(Malaysia) A R Kaur	16	19
(Japan) C Umezu	21	21
(Philippines) K Velez	14	3
3/4	(Finland) A Nieminen	21	21

Quarter-finals
(Japan) C Umezu	21	21
3/4	(Finland) A Nieminen	19	14

==== Section 4 ====
First Round
(Thailand) S Chansrisukot	21	15	10
(Indonesia) A Firdasari	14	21	21
(India) A Mutatkar	13	11
5/8	(Malaysia) J Wong P X	21	21
(Japan) K Imabeppu	21	21
(Malaysia) Wong M K	16	9
(Vietnam) Lê Ngọc N N	6	6
2	(Hong Kong) Yip P Y	21	21

Second Round
(Indonesia) A Firdasari	13	12
5/8	(Malaysia) J Wong P X	21	21
(Japan) K Imabeppu	14	21	11
2	(Hong Kong) Yip P Y	21	12	21

Quarter-finals
5/8	(Malaysia) J Wong P X	17	21	21
2	(Hong Kong) Yip P Y	21	13	14

== Men’s doubles ==
=== Seeds ===
1. (Malaysia) Robert Lin Woon Fui / Mohd Fairuzizuan Mohd Tazari (semi-finals)
2. (Thailand) Patapol Ngernsrisuk / Sudket Prapakamol (quarter-finals)
3. (Indonesia) Hendra Aprida Gunawan / Joko Riyadi (final)
4. (Indonesia) Uki Kasah Yoga / Suryatama Yonathan (semi-finals)
5. (Indonesia) Eng Hian / Rian Sukmawan (quarter-finals)
6. (India) Rupesh Kumar K. T. / Sanave Thomas (quarter-finals)
7. (Vietnam) Nguyễn Quang Minh / Trần Thanh Hải (quarter-finals)
8. (Hong Kong) Albertus Susanto Njoto / Yohan Hadikusumo Wiratama (champions)

=== Finals ===
Semi-finals
1	(Malaysia) Robert Lin Woon Fui (Malaysia) Mohd Fairuzizuan Mohd Tazari	21	12	19
3/4	(Indonesia) Hendra Aprida Gunawan (Indonesia) Joko Riyadi	18	21	21
3/4	(Indonesia) Uki Kasah Yoga (Indonesia) Suryatama Yonathan	12	19
5/8	(Hong Kong) Albertus Susanto Njoto (Hong Kong) Yohan Hadikusumo Wiratama	21	21

Final
3/4	(Indonesia) Hendra Aprida Gunawan (Indonesia) Joko Riyadi	21	19	18
5/8	(Hong Kong) Albertus Susanto Njoto (Hong Kong) Yohan Hadikusumo Wiratama	15	21	21

=== Top half ===
==== Section 1 ====
First Round
(Philippines) W Frias (Philippines) A Mailon	9	16
(Hong Kong) A T Putra (Hong Kong) Hui W H	21	21

Second Round
1	(Malaysia) R Lin W F (Malaysia) M F Mohd Tazari	23	20	21
(Philippines) K Asuncion (United States) R Raju	21	22	10
5/8	(Indonesia) E Hian (Indonesia) R Sukmawan	21	21
(Hong Kong) A T Putra (Hong Kong) Hui W H	17	18

Quarter-finals
1	(Malaysia) Lin W F (Malaysia) M F Mohd Tazari	21	21
5/8	(Indonesia) E Hian (Indonesia) R Sukmawan	19	18

==== Section 2 ====
First Round
(Thailand) S Anugritayawon (Thailand) N Narkthong	21	21
(Philippines) A Amahit Jr. (Philippines) L Escoses	19	11

Second Round
3/4	(Indonesia) H A Gunawan (Indonesia) J Riyadi	21	21
(Philippines) O Lopez (Philippines) R Bartolome	6	10
5/8	(India) R Kumar K. T. (India) S Thomas	21	21
(Thailand) S Anugritayawon (Thailand) N Narkthong	17	18

Quarter-finals
3/4	(Indonesia) H A Gunawan (Indonesia) J Riyadi	21	12	21
5/8	(India) R Kumar K. T. (India) S Thomas	9	21	11

=== Bottom half ===
==== Section 3 ====
First Round
(Macau) Chan I C (Macau) Lo I W	9	14
(Philippines) B J Garcia (Philippines) M Villarin	21	21
(Macau) Ho C L (Macau) Kou K S	6	9
(United States) E Go (United States) R Sou	21	21

Second Round
(Philippines) B J Garcia (Philippines) M Villarin	15	9
5/8	(Vietnam) Nguyễn Q M (Vietnam) Trần T H	21	21
(United States) E Go (United States) R Sou	11	10
3/4	(Indonesia) U K Yoga (Indonesia) S Yonathan	21	21

Quarter-finals
5/8	(Vietnam) Nguyễn Q M (Vietnam) Trần T H	14	14
3/4	(Indonesia) U K Yoga (Indonesia) S Yonathan	21	21

==== Section 4 ====
First Round
(Indonesia) F Kurniawan (Indonesia) R Wijaya	21	21
(Philippines) J Junio Jr. (Philippines) M A Natividad	14	14

Second Round
(Indonesia) F Kurniawan (Indonesia) R Wijaya	13	21	17
5/8	(Hong Kong) A S Njoto (Hong Kong) Y H Wiratama	21	15	21
(Canada) K Holoboff (Canada) R Liang	13	4
2	(Thailand) P Ngersrisuk (Thailand) S Prapakamol	21	21

Quarter-finals
5/8	(Hong Kong) A S Njoto (Hong Kong) Y H Wiratama	22	21	21
2	(Thailand) P Ngersrisuk (Thailand) S Prapakamol	24	11	15

== Women's doubles ==
=== Seeds ===
1. (Malaysia) Chin Eei Hui / Wong Pei Tty (semi-finals)
2. (Thailand) Sathinee Chankrachangwong / Saralee Thungthongkam (semi-finals)
3. (Thailand) Duanganong Aroonkesorn / Kunchala Voravichitchaikul (quarter-finals)
4. (Indonesia) Jo Novita / Greysia Polii (champions)
5. (Indonesia) Lita Nurlita / Natalia Christine Poluakan (quarter-finals)
6. (Malaysia) Fong Chew Yen / Ooi Sock Ai (second round)
7. (Hong Kong) Koon Wai Chee / Wong Man Ching (second round)
8. (Malaysia) Mooi Hing Yau / See Phui Leng (second round)

=== Finals ===
Semi-finals
1	(Malaysia) Chin Eei Hui (Malaysia) Wong Pei Tty	17	21	18
(Indonesia) Rani Mundiasti (Indonesia) Endang Nursugianti	21	19	21
3/4	(Indonesia) Jo Novita (Indonesia) Greysia Polii	21	21
2	(Thailand) Sathinee Chankrachangwong (Thailand) Saralee Thungthongkam	15	18

Final
(Indonesia) Rani Mundiasti (Indonesia) Endang Nursugianti	16	13
3/4	(Indonesia) Jo Novita (Indonesia) Greysia Polii	21	21

=== Top half ===
==== Section 1 ====
First Round
(Japan) Y Imabeppu (Japan) S Imai	21	21
(India) S Gokhale (India) A Mutatkar	8	9

Second Round
1	(Malaysia) Chin E H (Malaysia) Wong P T	21	21
(Philippines) K Asuncion (Indonesia) LL Wang	9	11
5/8	(Indonesia) L Nurlita (Indonesia) N C Poluakan	21	21
(Japan) Y Imabeppu (Japan) S Imai	12	13

Quarter-finals
1	(Malaysia) Chin E H (Malaysia) Wong P T	21	15	21
5/8	(Indonesia) L Nurlita (Indonesia) N C Poluakan	19	21	19

==== Section 2 ====
First Round
(Philippines) Rachel Guerrero (Philippines) Raquel Guerrero	9	8
(Indonesia) R Mundiasti (Indonesia) E Nursugianti	21	21

Second Round
3/4	(Thailand) D Aroonkesorn (Thailand) K Voravichitchaikul	21	21
(Hong Kong) Ng K S (Hong Kong) Wong S Y	12	7
5/8	(Malaysia) Fong C Y (Malaysia) Ooi S A	21	18	13
(Indonesia) R Mundiasti (Indonesia) E Nursugianti	18	21	21

Quarter-finals
3/4	(Thailand) D Aroonkesorn (Thailand) K Voravichitchaikul	13	7
(Indonesia) R Mundiasti (Indonesia) E Nursugianti	21	21

=== Bottom half ===
==== Section 3 ====
First Round
(India) R Misha (India) S Nehwal	17	12
(Malaysia) Lim P S (Malaysia) J Quay	21	21

Second Round
(Malaysia) Lim P S (Malaysia) J Quay	23	21
5/8	(Hong Kong) Koon W C (Hong Kong) Wong M C	21	11
(United States) J Coleman (United States) E Lee	13	13
3/4	(Indonesia) J Novita (Indonesia) G Polii	21	21

Quarter-finals
(Malaysia) Lim P S (Malaysia) J Quay	18	7
3/4	(Indonesia) J Novita (Indonesia) G Polii	21	21

==== Section 4 ====
First Round
(Japan) S Matsuo (Japan) I Tatani	21	21
(Philippines) P Chan (Philippines) T T Chan	3	7

Second Round
(Japan) S Matsuo (Japan) I Tatani	21	21
5/8	(Malaysia) Mooi H Y (Malaysia) See P L	13	8
(Macau) Lao I M (Macau) Pun S P	5	2
2	(Thailand) S Chankrachangwong (Thailand) S Thungthongkam	21	21

Quarter-finals
(Japan) S Matsuo (Japan) I Tatani	21	9
2	(Thailand) S Chankrachangwong (Thailand) S Thungthongkam	23	21

== Mixed doubles ==
=== Seeds ===
1. (Thailand) Songphon Anugritayawon / Kunchala Voravichitchaikul (quarter-finals)
2. (Thailand) Sudket Prapakamol / Saralee Thungthongkam (champions)
3. (Philippines) Kennevic Asuncion / Kennie Asuncion (final)
4. (Vietnam) Trần Thanh Hải / Lê Ngọc Nguyên Nhung (quarter-finals)
5. (Indonesia) Tri Kusharjanto / Minarti Timur (semi-finals)
6. (Thailand) Nuttaphon Narkthong / Duanganong Aroonkesorn (second round)
7. (Indonesia) Muhammad Rijal / Greysia Polii (semi-finals)
8. (Italy) Klaus Raffeiner / Agnese Allegrini (quarter-finals)

=== Finals ===
Semi-finals
5/8	(Indonesia) Tri Kusharjanto (Indonesia) Minarti Timur	15	18
3/4	(Philippines) Kennevic Asuncion (Philippines) Kennie Asuncion	21	21
5/8	(Indonesia) Muhammad Rijal (Indonesia) Greysia Polii	16	16
2	(Thailand) Sudket Prapakamol (Thailand) Saralee Thungthongkam	21	21

Final
3/4	(Philippines) Kennevic Asuncion (Philippines) Kennie Asuncion	18	16
2	(Thailand) Sudket Prapakamol (Thailand) Saralee Thungthongkam	21	21

=== Top half ===
==== Section 1 ====
First Round

Second Round
1	(Thailand) S Anugritayawan (Thailand) K Voravichitchaikul	21	21
(Philippines) J Junio Jr. (Philippines) I Chiu	15	4
5/8	(Indonesia) T Kusharjanto (Indonesia) M Timur	21	21
(United States) E Go (United States) E Lee	11	9

Quarter-finals
1	(Thailand) S Anugritayawan (Thailand) K Voravichitchaikul	18	18
5/8	(Indonesia) T Kusharjanto (Indonesia) M Timur	21	21

==== Section 2 ====
First Round
(Indonesia) P Setyo (Indonesia) LL Wang	21	21
(Macau) Lao I M (Macau) Lo I W	5	11

Second Round
3/4	(Philippines) Kennevic Asuncion (Philippines) Kennie Asuncion	21	21
(Japan) J Takemura (Japan) Y Imabeppu	13	19
5/8	(Thailand) N Narkthong (Thailand) D Aroonkesorn	15	21	14
(Indonesia) P Setyo (Indonesia) LL Wang	21	18	21

Quarter-finals
3/4	(Philippines) Kennevic Asuncion (Philippines) Kennie Asuncion	21	21
(Indonesia) P Setyo (Indonesia) LL Wang	12	19

=== Bottom half ===
==== Section 3 ====
First Round
(Philippines) A Mailon (Philippines) T Thristie	9	12
(Japan) I Tatani (Japan) Y Shinkai	21	21

Second Round
(Japan) I Tatani (Japan) Y Shinkai	16	16
5/8	(Indonesia) M Rijal (Indonesia) G Polii	21	21
(Macau) Chan I C (Macau) Pun S P	11	8
3/4	(Vietnam) Trần T H (Vietnam) Lê Ngọc N N	21	21

Quarter-finals
5/8	(Indonesia) M Rijal (Indonesia) G Polii	21	21
3/4	(Vietnam) Trần T H (Vietnam) Lê Ngọc N N	8	9

==== Section 4 ====
First Round

Second Round
(Philippines) W Frias (Philippines) P Chan	15	11
5/8	(Italy) K Raffeiner (Italy) A Allegrini	21	21
(Denmark) B Rafn (Canada) A Rice	9	6
2	(Thailand) S Prapakamol (Thailand) S Thungthongkam	21	21

Quarter-finals
5/8	(Italy) K Raffeiner (Italy) A Allegrini	7	12
2	(Thailand) S Prapakamol (Thailand) S Thungthongkam	21	21

Preceded by 2006 China Masters	IBF World Grand Prix; 2006 BWF season	Succeeded by 2006 Indonesia Open
