= 2006 Dutch Open (badminton) =

Badminton tournament

Official Logo

The 2006 Dutch Open in badminton was held in Den Bosch, Netherlands, from November 8, 2006 to November 12, 2006.

== Men's singles ==
=== Seeds ===
| Seed | Country/Player | Seed | Country/Player |
|---|---|---|---|
| 1 | (Netherlands) Eric Pang | 9/16 | (Canada) Bobby Milroy |
| 2 | (Netherlands) Dicky Palyama | 9/16 | (Malaysia) Lee Tsuen Seng |
| 3/4 | (Malaysia) Ayob Sairul Amar | 9/16 | (Denmark) Niels Christian Kaldau |
| 3/4 | withdrawn position | 9/16 | (Austria) Jurgen Koch |
| 5/8 | (Germany) Björn Joppien | 9/16 | (Czech Republic) Petr Koukal |
| 5/8 | (India) Anup Sridhar | 9/16 | (England) Nicolas Kidd |
| 5/8 | withdrawn position | 9/16 | withdrawn position |
| 5/8 | withdrawn position | 9/16 | withdrawn position |

=== Results ===
Quarterfinals
9/16 | (Canada) Bobby Milroy | 9 | 19
9/16 | (Malaysia) Lee Tsuen Seng | 21 | 21
3/4 | (Malaysia) Ayob Sairul Amar | 21 | 21 | 21
(Denmark) Rune Ulsing | 8 | 23 | 17
(China) Wu Yun Yong | 21 | 21
(India) Ajay Jayaram | 15 | 11
(Malaysia) Wong Choong Hann | 17 | 21 | 20
2 | (Netherlands) Dicky Palyama | 21 | 16 | 22

Semifinals
9/16 | (Malaysia) Lee Tsuen Seng | 17 | 18
3/4 | (Malaysia) Ayob Sairul Amar | 21 | 21
(China) Wu Yun Yong | 21 | 21
2 | (Netherlands) Dicky Palyama | 16 | 18

Finals
3/4 | (Malaysia) Ayob Sairul Amar | 22 | 14 | 21
(China) Wu Yun Yong | 20 | 21 | 9

== Men's doubles ==
=== Seeds ===
| Seed | Country/Players |
|---|---|
| 1 | withdrawn position |
| 2 | withdrawn position |
| 3/4 | (France) Mihail Popov / Svetoslav Stoyanov |
| 3/4 | withdrawn position |
| 5/8 | (Indonesia) Rian Sukmawan / Eng Hian |
| 5/8 | (Wales) Matthew Hughes / Martyn Lewis |
| 5/8 | (Denmark) Simon Mollyhus / Anders Kristiansen |
| 5/8 | (Germany) Kristof Hopp / Ingo Kindervater |

=== Results ===
Quarterfinals
(Denmark) Rasmus Mangor Andersen (Denmark) Peter Steffensen | 14 | 12
5/8 | (Indonesia) Rian Sukmawan (Indonesia) Eng Hian | 21 | 21
(Germany) Thomas Tesche (Germany) Michael Fuchs | 11 | 14
(Malaysia) Tan Bin Shen (Malaysia) Ong Soon Hock | 21 | 21
(Russia) Vitalij Durkin (Russia) Alexandr Nikolaenko | 18 | 21 | 12
(Indonesia) Hendra Gunawan (Indonesia) Joko Riyadi | 21 | 19 | 21
(England) Robert Adcock (England) Robin Middleton | 21 | 21
(Australia) Ashley Brehaut (Australia) Aji Sindoro Basuki | 14 | 15

Semifinals
5/8 | (Indonesia) Rian Sukmawan (Indonesia) Eng Hian | 21 | 21
(Malaysia) Tan Bin Shen (Malaysia) Ong Soon Hock | 16 | 15
(Indonesia) Hendra Gunawan (Indonesia) Joko Riyadi | 21 | 21
(England) Robert Adcock (England) Robin Middleton | 8 | 14

Finals
5/8 | (Indonesia) Rian Sukmawan (Indonesia) Eng Hian | 21 | 21
(Indonesia) Hendra Gunawan (Indonesia) Joko Riyadi | 15 | 10

== Women's singles ==
=== Seeds ===
| Seed | Country/Player |
|---|---|
| 1 | withdraw position |
| 2 | withdrawn position |
| 3/4 | (Netherlands) Yao Jie |
| 3/4 | (Bulgaria) Petya Nedelcheva |
| 5/8 | (Canada) Anna Rice |
| 5/8 | (Russia) Ella Karachkova |
| 5/8 | (Netherlands) Judith Meulendijks |
| 5/8 | (Germany) Petra Overzier |

=== Results ===
Quarterfinals
(China) Li Wenyan | 21 | 21
(Indonesia) Maria Kristin Yulianti | 16 | 19
3/4 | (Netherlands) Yao Jie | 23 | 17 | 14
(Australia) Chia Chi Huang | 21 | 21 | 21
(China) Wang Linling | 21 | 16 | 21
(Chinese Taipei) Pai Min-jie | 13 | 21 | 19
5/8 | (Germany) Petra Overzier | 21 | 14 | 14
(Indonesia) Adriyanti Firdasari | 16 | 21 | 21

Semifinals
(China) Li Wenyan | 21 | 21
(Australia) Chia Chi Huang | 16 | 10
(China) Wang Linling | AF
(Indonesia) Adriyanti Firdasari | wo

Finals
(China) Li Wenyan | 16 | 19
(Indonesia) Adriyanti Firdasari | 21 | 21

== Women's doubles ==
=== Seeds ===
| Seed | Country/Players |
|---|---|
| 1 | (Bulgaria) Petya Nedelcheva / Diana Dimova |
| 2 | (Malaysia) Pek Siah Lim / Swee Ling Joanne Quay |
| 3/4 | (Russia) Nina Vislova / Valeria Sorokina |
| 3/4 | withdrawn position |
| 5/8 | withdrawn position |
| 5/8 | withdrawn position |
| 5/8 | withdrawn position |
| 5/8 | withdrawn position |

=== Results ===
Quarterfinals
1 | (Bulgaria) Petya Nedelcheva (Bulgaria) Diana Dimova | 22 | 21
(France) Laura Choinet (France) Elisa Chanteur | 20 | 12
(Denmark) Mie Schjott-Kristensen (Denmark) Christinna Pedersen | 17 | 11
(Indonesia) Rani Mundiasti (Indonesia) Endang Nursugianti | 21 | 21
(Germany) Kathrin Piotrowski (Germany) Michaela Peiffer | 21 | 21
(Netherlands) Karina de Wit (Netherlands) Betty Krab | 16 | 15
(Russia) Marina Yakusheva (Russia) Elena Shimko | 21 | 19 | 19
2 | (Malaysia) Pek Siah Lim (Malaysia) Swee Ling Joanne Quay | 16 | 21 | 21

Semifinals
1 | (Bulgaria) Petya Nedelcheva (Bulgaria) Diana Dimova | 13 | 11
(Indonesia) Rani Mundiasti (Indonesia) Endang Nursugianti | 21 | 21
(Germany) Kathrin Piotrowski (Germany) Michaela Peiffer | 10 | 24 | 21
2 | (Malaysia) Pek Siah Lim (Malaysia) Swee Ling Joanne Quay | 21 | 22 | 11

Finals
(Indonesia) Rani Mundiasti (Indonesia) Endang Nursugianti | 21 | 21
(Germany) Kathrin Piotrowski (Germany) Michaela Peiffer | 16 | 16

== Mixed doubles ==
=== Seeds ===
| Seed | Country/Players |
|---|---|
| 1 | (Germany) Kristof Hopp / Birgit Overzier |
| 2 | (Germany) Ingo Kindervater / Kathrin Piotrowski |
| 3/4 | (France) Svetoslav Stoyanov / Elodie Eymard |
| 3/4 | (England) David Lindley / Suzanne Rayappan |
| 5/8 | (Indonesia) Flandy Limpele / Vita Marissa |
| 5/8 | (England) Kristian Roebuck / Natalie Munt |
| 5/8 | (Malaysia) Tan Bin Shen / Yu Hang Ooi |
| 5/8 | (England) Robert Blair / Jenny Wallwork |

=== Results ===
Quarterfinals
(Belgium) Wouter Claes (Belgium) Nathalie Descamps | 11 | 9
5/8 | (Indonesia) Flandy Limpele (Indonesia) Vita Marissa | 21 | 21
3/4 | (France) Svetoslav Stoyanov (France) Elodie Eymard | 21 | 21
5/8 | (England) Kristian Roebuck (England) Natalie Munt | 14 | 12
(England) Robert Adcock (England) Sarah Bok | 16 | 9
(Indonesia) Devin Lahardi (Indonesia) Yunita Tetty | 21 | 21
5/8 | (England) Robert Blair (England) Jenny Wallwork | 21 | 21
(France) Sebastien Vincent (France) Julie Delaune | 13 | 16

Semifinals
5/8 | (Indonesia) Flandy Limpele (Indonesia) Vita Marissa | 21 | 21
3/4 | (France) Svetoslav Stoyanov (France) Elodie Eymard | 18 | 15
(Indonesia) Devin Lahardi (Indonesia) Yunita Tetty | 19 | 16
5/8 | (England) Robert Blair (England) Jenny Wallwork | 21 | 21

Finals
5/8 | (Indonesia) Flandy Limpele (Indonesia) Vita Marissa | 18 | 18
5/8 | (England) Robert Blair (England) Jenny Wallwork | 21 | 21
