= 2006 China Masters =

Tournament details
- Dates: 8 March 2006 – 12 March 2006
- Edition: 2nd
- Level: World Grand Prix 6 Stars
- Total prize money: US$250,000
- Venue: Sichuan Gymnasium
- Location: Chengdu, China

Champions
- Men's singles: (China) Chen Jin
- Women's singles: (China) Wang Lin
- Men's doubles: (Denmark) Jens Eriksen (Denmark) Martin Lundgaard Hansen
- Women's doubles: (China) Gao Ling (China) Huang Sui
- Mixed doubles: (China) Xie Zhongbo (China) Zhang Yawen

The 2006 China Masters (officially known as the Aviva-Cofco China Masters Badminton Championships 2006 for sponsorship reasons) was badminton tournament which took place at the Sichuan Gymnasium in Chengdu, China, on from 8 to 12 March 2006 and had a total purse of $250,000. This is the first Grand Prix tournament to use 21-points system.

== Tournament ==
The 2006 China Masters was the fourth tournament of the 2006 IBF World Grand Prix and also part of the China Masters championships, which had been held since 2005.

=== Venue ===
This international tournament was held at Sichuan Gymnasium in Chengdu, China.

=== Point distribution ===
Below is the point distribution table for each phase of the tournament based on the IBF points system for the IBF World Grand Prix 4-star event.

Winner	Runner-up	3/4	5/8	9/16	17/32
5,400	4,590	3,780	2,970	2,160	1,350

=== Prize pool ===
The total prize money for this tournament was US$250,000. The distribution of the prize money was in accordance with IBF regulations.

Event	Winner	Finalist	Semi-finals	Quarter-finals	Last 16
Men's singles	$20,000	$10,000	$5,000	$2,500	$1,000
Women's singles	$17,250	$8,250	$4,500	$2,250	—N/a
Men's doubles	$18,000	$10,000	$6,000	$3,500	—N/a
Women's doubles	$15,250	$10,000	$5,500	$2,750	—N/a
Mixed doubles	$15,250	$10,000	$5,500	$2,750	—N/a

== Men's singles ==
=== Finals ===
Semi-finals
(China) Lin Dan	18	21	19
(Denmark) Peter Gade	21	19	21
(China) Chen Jin	21	21
(Denmark) Kenneth Jonassen	16	18

Final
(Denmark) Peter Gade	19	14
(China) Chen Jin	21	21

=== Top half ===
==== Section 1 ====
First Round
(Netherlands) Dicky Palyama	21	21
(Japan) Yousuke Nakanishi	15	10
(Malaysia) Yeoh Kay Bin	21	15	21
(China) Qiu Yanbo	15	21	9

Second Round
(China) Lin Dan	21	21
(Netherlands) Dicky Palyama	17	10
(Denmark) Niels Christian Kaldau	13	19
(Malaysia) Yeoh Kay Bin	21	21

Quarter-finals
(China) Lin Dan	21	21
(Malaysia) Yeoh Kay Bin	18	17

==== Section 2 ====
First Round
(Thailand) Poompat Sapkulchananart	14	21	21
(South Korea) Jang Young-soo	21	15	19
(China) Chen Yu	21	21
(Malaysia) Yogendran Khrishnan	12	17

Second Round
(Denmark) Peter Gade	21	21
(Thailand) Poompat Sapkulchananart	17	12
(Malaysia) Kuan Beng Hong	21	15
(China) Chen Yu	23	21

Quarter-finals
(Denmark) Peter Gade	21	20	21
(China) Chen Yu	16	22	15

=== Bottom half ===
==== Section 3 ====
First Round
(Malaysia) Pei Wee Chung	12	7
(Thailand) Boonsak Ponsana	21	21
(South Korea) Ahn Hyun-suk	23	21	13
(China) Xia Xuanze	25	17	21

Second Round
(Thailand) Boonsak Ponsana	18	18
(China) Chen Jin	21	21
(China) Xia Xuanze	21	19	11
(Malaysia) Muhammad Hafiz Hashim	17	21	21

Quarter-finals
(China) Chen Jin	21	21
(Malaysia) Muhammad Hafiz Hashim	17	17

==== Section 4 ====
First Round
(China) Lü Yi	21	21
(Hong Kong) Yohan Hadikusumo Wiratama	5	8
(China) Li Yu	20	10
(Malaysia) Lee Tsuen Seng	22	21

Second Round
(China) Lü Yi	19	8
(Denmark) Kenneth Jonassen	21	21
(Malaysia) Lee Tsuen Seng	12	14
(China) Chen Hong	21	21

Quarter-finals
(Denmark) Kenneth Jonassen	11	21	21
(China) Chen Hong	21	10	16

== Women's singles ==
=== Finals ===
Semi-finals
(China) Wang Lin	19	21	21
(Hong Kong) Wang Chen	21	18	17
(Netherlands) Mia Audina	15	21	11
(China) Xie Xingfang	21	12	21

Final
(China) Wang Lin	15	21	21
(China) Xie Xingfang	21	13	15

=== Top half ===
==== Section 1 ====
First Round
(Germany) Nicole Grether	13	12
(China) Wang Lin	21	21

Second Round
(China) Zhang Ning	21	21
(Finland) Anu Nieminen	5	17
(Netherlands) Yao Jie	12	16
(China) Wang Lin	21	21

Quarter-finals
(China) Zhang Ning	21	17	19
(China) Wang Lin	18	21	21

==== Section 2 ====
First Round
(China) Wang Yihan	21	21
(South Korea) Kim Moon-hi	17	12
(Chinese Taipei) Cheng Shao-chieh	8	16
(China) Zhu Lin	21	21

Second Round
(Hong Kong) Wang Chen	21	21
(China) Wang Yihan	11	11
(Germany) Xu Huaiwen	21	21
(China) Zhu Lin	16	19

Quarter-finals
(Hong Kong) Wang Chen	21	11	21
(Germany) Xu Huaiwen	17	21	17

=== Bottom half ===
==== Section 3 ====
First Round
(Thailand) Salakjit Ponsana	10	21	8
(China) Chen Li	21	17	21
(China) Jiang Yanjiao	21	21
(South Korea) Jang Soo-young	14	6

Second Round
(China) Chen Li	17	17
(Netherlands) Mia Audina	21	21
(China) Jiang Yanjiao	21	19	21
(France) Pi Hongyan	19	21	16

Quarter-finals
(Netherlands) Mia Audina	21	16	21
(China) Jiang Yanjiao	17	21	18

==== Section 4 ====
First Round
(Poland) Kamila Augustyn	7	12
(China) Lu Lan	21	21

Second Round
(China) Lu Lan	21	16	21
(Japan) Eriko Hirose	16	21	15
(Germany) Juliane Schenk	15	20
(China) Xie Xingfang	21	22

Quarter-finals
(China) Lu Lan
(China) Xie Xingfang	w	/	o

== Men's doubles ==
=== Finals ===
Semi-finals
(Denmark) Jens Eriksen (Denmark) Martin Lundgaard Hansen	21	10	21
(Poland) Michał Łogosz (Poland) Robert Mateusiak	13	21	17
(United States) Howard Bach (United States) Tony Gunawan	8	15
(China) Cai Yun (China) Fu Haifeng	21	21

Final
(Denmark) Jens Eriksen (Denmark) Martin Lundgaard Hansen	21	21
(China) Cai Yun (China) Fu Haifeng	17	17

=== Top half ===
==== Section 1 ====
First Round

Second Round
(Denmark) Jens Eriksen (Denmark) Martin Lundgaard Hansen	22	18	21
(Malaysia) Chew Choon Eng (Malaysia) Tan Bin Shen	20	21	19
(Hong Kong) Liu Kwok Wa (Hong Kong) Albertus Susanto Njoto	18	21	19
(China) He Hanbin (China) Shen Ye	21	8	21

Quarter-finals
(Denmark) Jens Eriksen (Denmark) Martin Lundgaard Hansen	21	21
(China) He Hanbin (China) Shen Ye	14	18

==== Section 2 ====
First Round

Second Round
(Poland) Michał Łogosz (Poland) Robert Mateusiak	21	21
(China) Gong Weijie (China) Xia Xuanze	13	18
(China) Guo Zhendong (China) Xie Zhongbo	21	20	21
(Germany) Kristof Hopp (Germany) Ingo Kindervater	13	22	12

Quarter-finals
(Poland) Michał Łogosz (Poland) Robert Mateusiak	21	22	21
(China) Guo Zhendong (China) Xie Zhongbo	18	24	14

=== Bottom half ===
==== Section 3 ====
First Round
(China) Sun Junjie (China) Xu Chen	w	/	o
(Denmark) Thomas Laybourn (Denmark) Lars Paaske

Second Round
(China) Sun Junjie (China) Xu Chen	10	10
(United States) Howard Bach (United States) Tony Gunawan	21	21
(China) Sang Yang (China) Zheng Bo	20	15
(Malaysia) Mohd Zakry Abdul Latif (Malaysia) Gan Teik Chai	22	21

Quarter-finals
(United States) Howard Bach (United States) Tony Gunawan	21	21
(Malaysia) Mohd Zakry Abdul Latif (Malaysia) Gan Teik Chai	18	15

==== Section 4 ====
First Round

Second Round
(Malaysia) Hoon Thien How (Malaysia) Tan Boon Heong	21	21
(Japan) Shintaro Ikeda (Japan) Shuichi Sakamoto	13	16
(France) Mihail Popov (France) Svetoslav Stoyanov	12	16
(China) Cai Yun (China) Fu Haifeng	21	21

Quarter-finals
(Malaysia) Hoon Thien How (Malaysia) Tan Boon Heong	14	18
(China) Cai Yun (China) Fu Haifeng	21	21

== Women's doubles ==
=== Finals ===
Semi-finals
(China) Wei Yili (China) Zhang Yawen	21	21
(Chinese Taipei) Cheng Wen-hsing (Chinese Taipei) Chien Yu-chin	9	14
(China) Du Jing (China) Yu Yang	9	16
(China) Gao Ling (China) Huang Sui	21	21

Final
(China) Wei Yili (China) Zhang Yawen	12	21	14
(China) Gao Ling (China) Huang Sui	21	18	21

=== Top half ===
First Round
(Japan) Kumiko Ogura (Japan) Reiko Shiota	10	11
(China) Wei Yili (China) Zhang Yawen	21	21
(Germany) Nicole Grether (Germany) Juliane Schenk	18	21	19
(China) Pan Pan (China) Zhang Dan	21	16	21

Quarter-finals
(China) Yang Wei (China) Zhang Jiewen
(China) Wei Yili (China) Zhang Yawen	w	/	o
(Chinese Taipei) Cheng Wen-hsing (Chinese Taipei) Chien Yu-chin	18	21	21
(China) Pan Pan (China) Zhang Dan	21	13	5

Semi-finals
(China) Wei Yili (China) Zhang Yawen	21	21
(Chinese Taipei) Cheng Wen-hsing (Chinese Taipei) Chien Yu-chin	9	14

=== Bottom half ===
First Round
(Hong Kong) Chau Hoi Wah (Hong Kong) Wong Man Ching	5	9
(China) Du Jing (China) Yu Yang	21	21
(China) Liao Jingmei (China) Wang Xiaoli	17	21	21
(Poland) Kamila Augustyn (Poland) Nadieżda Kostiuczyk	21	10	19

Quarter-finals
(China) Du Jing (China) Yu Yang	21	23	14
(Thailand) Sathinee Chankrachangwong (Thailand) Saralee Thungthongkam	13	21
(China) Liao Jingmei (China) Wang Xiaoli	13	10
(China) Gao Ling (China) Huang Sui	21	21

Semi-finals
(China) Du Jing (China) Yu Yang	9	16
(China) Gao Ling (China) Huang Sui	21	21

== Mixed doubles ==
=== Finals ===
Semi-finals
(China) Zhang Jun (China) Gao Ling	21	21
(Poland) Robert Mateusiak (Poland) Nadieżda Kostiuczyk	19	14
(Denmark) Jens Eriksen (Denmark) Mette Schjoldager	20	19
(China) Xie Zhongbo (China) Zhang Yawen	22	21

Final
(China) Zhang Jun (China) Gao Ling	16	21	20
(China) Xie Zhongbo (China) Zhang Yawen	21	10	22

=== Top half ===
First Round
(China) He Hanbin (China) Liao Jingmei	21	21
(France) Svetoslav Stoyanov (France) Pi Hongyan	7	19

Quarter-finals
(China) Zhang Jun (China) Gao Ling	22	21
(Chinese Taipei) Tsai Chia-hsin (Chinese Taipei) Chien Yu-chin	20	9
(Poland) Robert Mateusiak (Poland) Nadieżda Kostiuczyk	21	19	21
(China) He Hanbin (China) Liao Jingmei	15	21	18

Semi-finals
(China) Zhang Jun (China) Gao Ling	21	21
(Poland) Robert Mateusiak (Poland) Nadieżda Kostiuczyk	19	14

=== Bottom half ===
First Round
(United States) Tony Gunawan (Chinese Taipei) Cheng Wen-hsing	21	23	19
(China) Xu Chen (China) Yu Yang	17	25	21
(China) Shen Ye (China) Wang Xiaoli	18	13
(Germany) Ingo Kindervater (Germany) Kathrin Piotrowski	21	21

Quarter-finals
(China) Xu Chen (China) Yu Yang	17	26
(Denmark) Jens Eriksen (Denmark) Mette Schjoldager	21	28
(Germany) Ingo Kindervater (Germany) Kathrin Piotrowski	21	8	14
(China) Xie Zhongbo (China) Zhang Yawen	17	21	21

Semi-finals
(Denmark) Jens Eriksen (Denmark) Mette Schjoldager	20	19
(China) Xie Zhongbo (China) Zhang Yawen	22	21

Preceded by 2006 All England Open	IBF World Grand Prix; 2006 BWF season	Succeeded by 2006 Philippines Open
