= 2006 Denmark Open =

The 2006 Denmark Open in badminton was held in Aarhus, Denmark, from October 31 to November 5, 2006.

The prize money was US$170,000.

== Venue ==
- Aarhus Atletion, The Arena

== Results ==
=== Men's singles ===
1st round
(Denmark) Gade | 21 | 21
(Malaysia) Wong | 17 | 12
(Netherlands) Palyama | 21 | 12 | 21
(Canada) Dabeka | 12 | 21 | 14
(China) Chen | 21 | 21
(Wales) Vaughan | 13 | 7
(Denmark) Persson | 21 | 22
(Singapore) Kendrick | 18 | 20
(Indonesia) Kanetkar | 9 | 11
(Malaysia) Ayob | 21 | 21
(Poland) Wacha | 10 | 21 | 23
(Denmark) Jonassen | 21 | 18 | 25
(Malaysia) Hashim | 16 | 21 | 17
(Malaysia) Seng | 21 | 14 | 21
(India) Anand | 16 | 15
(China) Chen | 21 | 21

2nd round
(Denmark) Gade | 21 | 21
(Netherlands) Palyama | 14 | 18
(China) Chen | 21 | 21
(Denmark) Persson | 15 | 13
(Malaysia) Ayob | 9 | 11
(Denmark) Jonassen | 21 | 21
(Malaysia) Seng | 15 | 9
(China) Chen | 21 | 21

Semifinals
(Denmark) Gade | 22 | 15
(China) Chen | 24 | 21
(Denmark) Jonassen | 21 | 19 | 16
(China) Chen | 18 | 21 | 21

Finals
(China) Chen | 18 | 18
(China) Chen | 21 | 21

=== Others ===
| Category | Winners | Runners-up | Score |
|---|---|---|---|
| Women's singles | (China) Jiang Yanjiao | (China) Lu Lan | 21–14, 21–14 |
| Men's doubles | (Denmark) Lars Paaske & Jonas Rasmussen | (Denmark) Mathias Boe & Joachim Fischer | 18–21, 21–10, 21–17 |
| Women doubles | (Poland) Kamila Augustyn & Nadieżda Kostiuczyk | (England) Gail Emms & Donna Kellogg | 22–20, 21–10 |
| Mixed doubles | (England) Anthony Clark & Donna Kellogg | (Denmark) Thomas Laybourn & Kamilla Rytter Juhl | 14–21, 21–14, 22–20 |
