= Andrew Smith (badminton) =

English badminton player

Personal information
- Born: Andrew Michael Smith; 3 June 1984 (age 42) Portsmouth, England
- Height: 1.78 m (5 ft 10 in)

Sport
- Country: England
- Sport: Badminton
- Handedness: Right
- Coached by: David Hunt

Men's singles
- Highest ranking: 12 (5 April 2007)
- BWF profile
Medal record
Men's badminton
Representing England
Sudirman Cup
Bronze medal – third place	2007 Glasgow	Mixed team
European Mixed Team Championships
Silver medal – second place	2009 Liverpool	Mixed team
European Men's Team Championships
Silver medal – second place	2008 Almere	Men's team
Bronze medal – third place	2006 Thessalonica	Men's team

Andrew Michael Smith (born 3 June 1984) is an English badminton player.

== Career ==
He had won the New Zealand International in 2004, the Australian International in 2004 and 2005, and also the Croatian International and the Vietnam Open in 2006. In 2008, he made it into the quarter finals of India Open and semifinals of Singapore Super Series.

Smith competed at the 2006 IBF World Championships. He defeated Pablo Abián of Spain 21–15, 21–13 in the first round. Then was defeated by Sony Dwi Kuncoro of Indonesia 21–19, 21–13.

Although possessing a World ranking of 17, he did not attend the English National Championships in Manchester in 2007. He represented Great Britain in the badminton men's singles at the 2008 Beijing Olympic Games.

== Achievements ==
=== IBF World Grand Prix (1 title) ===
The World Badminton Grand Prix sanctioned by International Badminton Federation (IBF) since 1983.

Men's singles
Year	Tournament	Opponent	Score	Result
2006	Vietnam Open	(Malaysia) Ismail Saman	21–14, 12–21, 21–19	(gold) Winner

=== BWF International Challenge/Series (6 titles, 7 runners-up) ===
Men's singles
Year	Tournament	Opponent	Score	Result
2013	Cyprus International	(Republic of Ireland) Scott Evans	17–21, 11–21	(silver) Runner-up
2012	Victorian International	(India) Anup Sridhar	13–21, 11–21	(silver) Runner-up
2012	Slovenian International	(India) Mohit Kamat	21–18, 21–17	(gold) Winner
2008	Canadian International	(Japan) Shoji Sato	18–21, 16–21	(silver) Runner-up
2006	Dutch International	(Germany) Björn Joppien	19–21, 15–21	(silver) Runner-up
2006	Croatian International	(Canada) Andrew Dabeka	21–7, 22–24, 21–19	(gold) Winner
2005	Australian International	(New Zealand) Geoffrey Bellingham	15–8, 15–10	(gold) Winner
2004	Australian International	(Sri Lanka) Niluka Karunaratne	15–7, 15–8	(gold) Winner
2004	New Zealand International	(Japan) Yuichi Ikeda	15–0, 15–8	(gold) Winner
2004	Western Australia International	(Malaysia) Sairul Amar Ayob	12–15, 4–15	(silver) Runner-up
2004	Auckland International	(Malaysia) Sairul Amar Ayob	6–15, 11–15	(silver) Runner-up
2004	Ballarat International	(Malaysia) Sairul Amar Ayob	7–15, 13–15	(silver) Runner-up

Men's doubles
Year	Tournament	Partner	Opponent	Score	Result
2011	Counties Manukau International	(New Zealand) Daniel Shirley	(Australia) Wesley Caulkett (Australia) Raymond Tam	21–12, 21–10	(gold) Winner

BWF International Challenge tournament
BWF International Series tournament
BWF Future Series tournament
