= Yousuke Nakanishi =

Japanese badminton player (born 1979)

Yōsuke Nakanishi
Personal information
- Born: 30 August 1979 (age 47) Takamatsu, Kagawa Prefecture, Japan
- Height: 1.74 m (5 ft 9 in)

Sport
- Country: Japan
- Sport: Badminton
- Handedness: Right

Men's singles & doubles
- Highest ranking: 29 (MS, 17 October 2006); 33 (MD with Shinya Ohtsuka, 12 March 2002)
- BWF profile

Yousuke Nakanishi (中西 洋介, Nakanishi Yōsuke; born 30 August 1979) is a former badminton player from Japan.

== Career ==
Nakanishi played the 2007 BWF World Championships in men's singles, and was defeated in the second round by Sony Dwi Kuncoro, of Indonesia, 21–15, 21–16.

== Achievements ==
=== World University Championships ===
Men's singles
Year	Venue	Opponent	Score	Result	Ref.
2000	Sofia, Bulgaria	(Poland) Jacek Niedźwiedzki	11–15, 8–15	Bronze	

=== IBF World Grand Prix ===
The World Badminton Grand Prix sanctioned by International Badminton Federation (IBF) from 1983 to 2006.

Men's singles
Year	Tournament	Opponent	Score	Result	Ref.
2002	Puerto Rico Open	(Denmark) Peter Rasmussen	4–15, 5–15	(silver) Runner-up	
2006	U.S. Open	(Canada) Andrew Dabeka	21–16, 21–13	(gold) Winner	
2007	U.S. Open	(Malaysia) Lee Tsuen Seng	14–21, 10–21	(silver) Runner-up	

Men's doubles
Year	Tournament	Partner	Opponent	Score	Result	Ref.
2001	U.S. Open	(Japan) Shinya Ohtsuka	(South Korea) Kang Kyung-jin (South Korea) Park Young-duk	0–7, 3–7, 3–7	(silver) Runner-up	

=== BWF International Challenge/Series ===
Men's singles
Year	Tournament	Opponent	Score	Result	Ref.
2002	Western Australia International	(Japan) Hidetaka Yamada	0–7, 7–5, 7–4, 7–6	(gold) Winner	
2003	Iran Fajr International	(Japan) Shōji Satō	4–15, 14–17	(silver) Runner-up	
2003	Sri Lanka International	(India) Utsav Mishra	9–15, 15–1, 15–13	(gold) Winner	
2005	Waikato International	(New Zealand) John Moody	15–17, 8–15	(silver) Runner-up	
2007	Victorian International	(Japan) Sho Sasaki	10–21, 9–21	(silver) Runner-up	

Men's doubles
Year	Tournament	Partner	Opponent	Score	Result	Ref.
2000	Scottish International	(Japan) Shinya Ohtsuka	(England) Peter Jeffrey (England) David Lindley	7–15, 15–12, 12–15	(silver) Runner-up	

BWF International Series tournament
