= Joko Riyadi =

Indonesian badminton player (born 1985)

Personal information
- Born: 30 June 1985 (age 41) Sukoharjo, Central Java, Indonesia
- Height: 1.78 m (5 ft 10 in)
- Weight: 72 kg (159 lb)

Sport
- Country: Indonesia
- Sport: Badminton
- Handedness: Right
- Event: Men's doubles

Men's doubles
- BWF profile
Medal record
Men's badminton
Representing Indonesia
Sudirman Cup
Silver medal – second place	2007 Glasgow	Mixed team
Thomas Cup
Bronze medal – third place	2008 Jakarta	Men's team
Asian Championships
Bronze medal – third place	2005 Hyderabad	Men's doubles
Southeast Asian Games
Gold medal – first place	2007 Nakhon Ratchasima	Men's team
Bronze medal – third place	2007 Nakhon Ratchasima	Men's doubles
World Junior Championships
Bronze medal – third place	2002 Pretoria	Mixed team
Asian Junior Championships
Gold medal – first place	2002 Kuala Lumpur	Boys' team
Bronze medal – third place	2002 Kuala Lumpur	Boys' doubles

Joko Riyadi (born 30 June 1985) is an Indonesian badminton player affiliated with Jaya Raya Jakarta club.

== Career ==
Riyadi played men's doubles with Hendra Aprida Gunawan. They were bronze medalists at the 2005 Asian Badminton Championships, runners-up at the 2006 Dutch Open, and bronze medalists at the 2007 Southeast Asian Games. At the 2007 BWF World Championships they were seeded #14 and were defeated in the third round by Guo Zhendong and Xie Zhongbo, of China, 22–20, 16–21, 21–16. With new partner Luluk Hadiyanto he won the 2009 Vietnam Open.

== Post-playing career ==
After resigning from the national team and being an independent player for a while, Riyadi retired from international tournament and is now a member of the coaching staff of his former club Jaya Raya and coaching some independent players like Pia Zebadiah Bernadet, Rizki Amelia Pradipta, and Markis Kido.

== Personal life ==
When he was young, he joined the Jaya Raya Jakarta club. His parents' names are Joko Suseno (father) and Ari Wahyuni (mother). His hobby is football. Normally people call him Joko.

== Achievements ==
=== Asian Championships ===
Men's doubles
Year	Venue	Partner	Opponent	Score	Result
2005	Gachibowli Indoor Stadium; Hyderabad, India	(Indonesia) Hendra Aprida Gunawan	(South Korea) Jung Jae-sung (South Korea) Lee Jae-jin	15–8, 8–15, 6–15	Bronze

=== Southeast Asian Games ===
Men's doubles
Year	Venue	Partner	Opponent	Score	Result
2007	Wongchawalitkul University; Nakhon Ratchasima, Thailand	(Indonesia) Hendra Aprida Gunawan	(Singapore) Hendri Saputra (Singapore) Hendra Wijaya	19–21, 19–21	Bronze

=== Asian Junior Championships ===
Boys' doubles
Year	Venue	Partner	Opponent	Score	Result
2002	Kuala Lumpur Badminton Stadium; Kuala Lumpur, Malaysia	(Indonesia) Hendra Setiawan	(South Korea) Han Sang-hoon (South Korea) Kim Dae-sung		Bronze

=== BWF Grand Prix ===
The BWF Grand Prix had two levels, the Grand Prix and Grand Prix Gold. It was a series of badminton tournaments sanctioned by the Badminton World Federation (BWF) and played between 2007 and 2017. The World Badminton Grand Prix was sanctioned by the International Badminton Federation from 1983 to 2006.

Men's doubles
Year	Tournament	Partner	Opponent	Score	Result
2004	Chinese Taipei Open	(Indonesia) Hendra Aprida Gunawan	(Malaysia) Chan Chong Ming (Malaysia) Koo Kien Keat	15–6, 13–15, 6–15	(silver) Runner-up
2006	Philippines Open	(Indonesia) Hendra Aprida Gunawan	(Hong Kong) Albertus Susanto Njoto (Hong Kong) Yohan Hadikusumo Wiratama	21–18, 12–21, 19–21	(silver) Runner-up
2006	Bitburger Open	(Indonesia) Hendra Aprida Gunawan	(Poland) Michał Łogosz (Poland) Robert Mateusiak	13–21, 13–21	(silver) Runner-up
2006	Dutch Open	(Indonesia) Hendra Aprida Gunawan	(Indonesia) Eng Hian (Indonesia) Rian Sukmawan	15–21, 10–21	(silver) Runner-up
2009	Vietnam Open	(Indonesia) Luluk Hadiyanto	(Malaysia) Hoon Thien How (Malaysia) Ong Soon Hock	21–19, 22–20	(gold) Winner

BWF Grand Prix Gold tournament
BWF Grand Prix tournament

=== BWF International Challenge/Series/Satellite ===
Men's doubles
Year	Tournament	Partner	Opponent	Score	Result
2002	Singapore Satellite	(Indonesia) Hendra Setiawan	(Indonesia) Donny Prasetyo (Indonesia) Denny Setiawan	5–15, 7–15	(silver) Runner-up
2004	Malaysia Satellite	(Indonesia) Hendra Aprida Gunawan	(Malaysia) Chew Choon Eng (Malaysia) Choong Tan Fook	11–15, 4–15	(silver) Runner-up
2006	Jakarta Satellite	(Indonesia) Hendra Aprida Gunawan	(Indonesia) Tri Kusharjanto (Indonesia) Bambang Suprianto	21–12, 21–19	(gold) Winner
2006	Thailand Asian Satellite	(Indonesia) Hendra Aprida Gunawan	(Thailand) Patapol Ngernsrisuk (Thailand) Sudket Prapakamol	21–14, 16–21, 15–21	(silver) Runner-up
2010	India International	(Indonesia) Yoga Ukikasah	(India) Akshay Dewalkar (India) Arun Vishnu	24–22, 21–16	(gold) Winner

BWF International Challenge tournament
BWF International Series tournament

== Participation at Indonesian Team ==
- 1 time at Sudirman Cup (2007)
- 1 time at Thomas Cup (2008)
