= Philippines Open (badminton) =

- Founded: 2006; 20 years ago
- Editions: 3
- Location: Philippines

Last completed
- 2009 Philippines Open

The Philippines Open Grand Prix Gold also known as the Philippine Open Badminton Championships in 2006 or simply as the Philippines Open, was an international badminton open held in the Philippines from 2006 to 2009.

== History ==
It was the top tournament of the Philippine Badminton Association (PBA) and was backed by title sponsor Bingo Bonanza of ABLE Inc.. The 2006 edition marked the first time that an International Badminton Federation (IBF) tournament was held in the Philippines.

It was not held in 2008, due to scheduling conflict with the 2008 Summer Olympics in Beijing which could have potentially affected the availability of top badminton players.

The 2009 edition was held amidst a leadership dispute within the PBA. It was the last year the international tournament was held.

== Winners ==
Year	Men's singles	Women's singles	Men's doubles	Women's doubles	Mixed doubles	Ref.
2006	(Malaysia) Muhammad Hafiz Hashim	(India) Saina Nehwal	(Hong Kong) Albertus Susanto Njoto (Hong Kong) Yohan Hadikusumo Wiratama	(Indonesia) Jo Novita (Indonesia) Greysia Polii	(Thailand) Sudket Prapakamol (Thailand) Saralee Thungthongkam	
2007	(Malaysia) Lee Chong Wei	(Hong Kong) Zhou Mi	(Malaysia) Koo Kien Keat (Malaysia) Tan Boon Heong	(Chinese Taipei) Cheng Wen-hsing (Chinese Taipei) Chien Yu-chin	(Indonesia) Nova Widianto (Indonesia) Liliyana Natsir	
2008	Not held due to the 2008 Summer Olympics					
2009	(China) Chen Long	(China) Wang Xin	(Indonesia) Mohammad Ahsan (Indonesia) Bona Septano	(China) Gao Ling (China) Wei Yili	(China) Zhang Nan (China) Lu Lu	

== Performances by nation ==
No	Nation	MS	WS	MD	WD	XD	Total
1	China	1	1		1	1	4
2	Indonesia			1	1	1	3
2	Malaysia	2		1			3
3	Hong Kong		1	1			2
4	Thailand					1	1
4	Chinese Taipei				1		1
4	India		1				1
Total		3	3	3	3	3	15
