= Sairul Amar Ayob =

Malaysian badminton player and coach (born 1980)

Personal information
- Born: Sairul Amar bin Ayob; 10 September 1980 (age 46) Kangar, Perlis, Malaysia
- Years active: 1998-2010
- Height: 1.88 m (6 ft 2 in)

Sport
- Country: Malaysia
- Sport: Badminton
- Handedness: Right

Men's singles
- Highest ranking: 52 (17 December 2009)
- BWF profile
Medal record
Men's badminton
Representing Malaysia
Asian Junior Championships
Silver medal – second place	1998 Kuala Lumpur	Boys' team

Sairul Amar bin Ayob (born 10 September 1980) is a former male badminton player and subsequent coach from Malaysia. He won the 2005 New Zealand Open after defeating Hong Kong's Chan Yan Kit in the final.

== Achievements ==
=== BWF Grand Prix (2 titles, 1 runner-up) ===
The BWF Grand Prix had two levels, the BWF Grand Prix and Grand Prix Gold. It was a series of badminton tournaments sanctioned by the Badminton World Federation (BWF) which was held from 2007 to 2017.

Men's singles
Year	Tournament	Opponent	Score	Result
2005	New Zealand Open	(Hong Kong) Chan Yan Kit	15–8, 17–16	(gold) Winner
2006	Dutch Open	(China) Wu Yunyong	22–20, 14–21, 21–9	(gold) Winner
2008	New Zealand Open	(Malaysia) Lee Tsuen Seng	22–24, 17–21	(silver) Runner-up

IBF World Grand Prix tournament
Grand Prix Tournament
