= Lee Tsuen Seng =

Malaysian badminton player (born 1979)

Lee Tsuen Seng 李传成
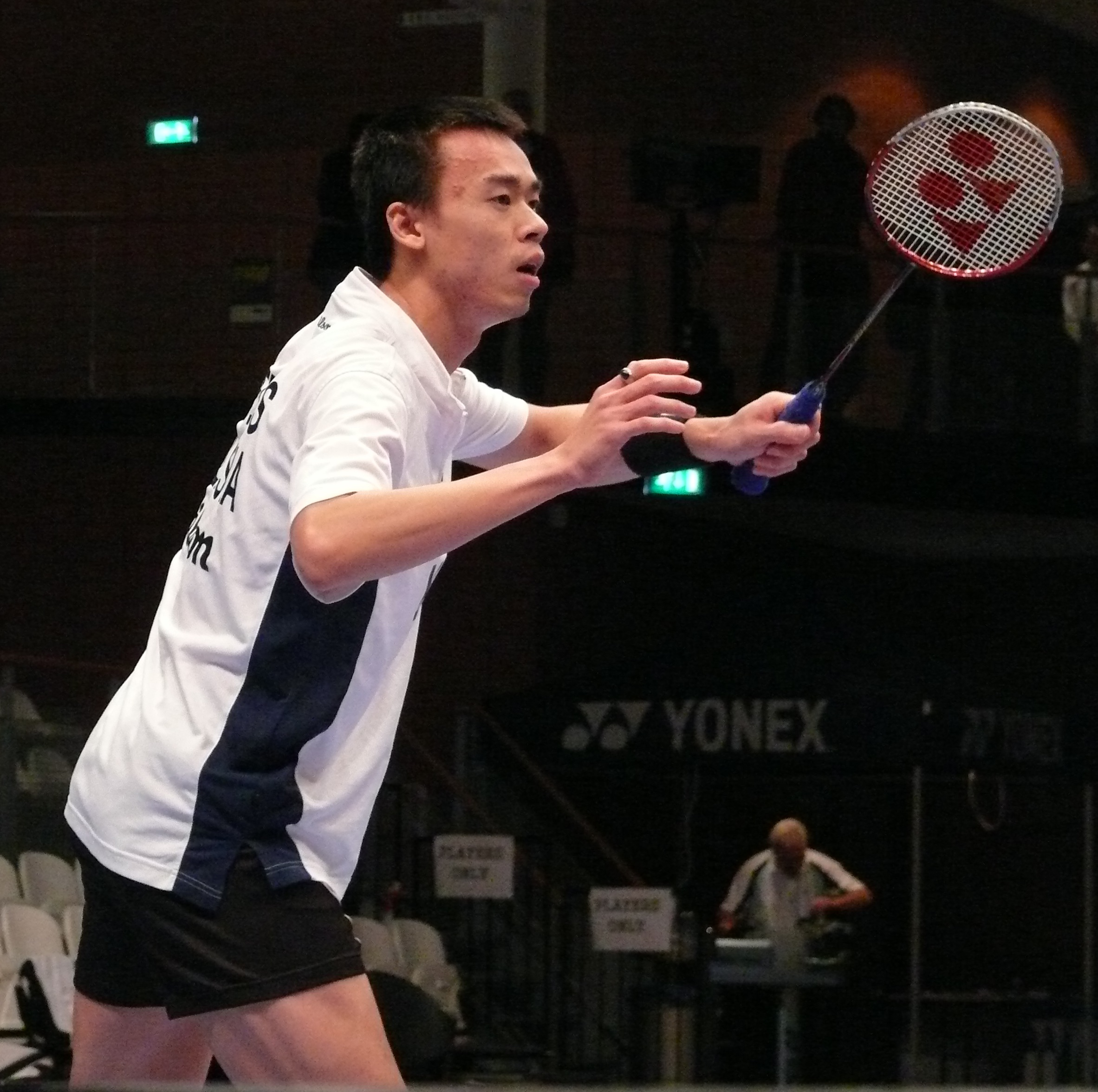

Personal information
- Born: 26 April 1979 (age 47) Ipoh, Perak, Malaysia
- Years active: 1997–2010
- Height: 1.80 m (5 ft 11 in)
- Weight: 71 kg (157 lb)

Sport
- Country: Malaysia
- Sport: Badminton
- Handedness: Left

Men's singles
- Career title: 9
- BWF profile
Medal record
Men's badminton
Representing Malaysia
Thomas Cup
Silver medal – second place	2002 Guangzhou	Team
Commonwealth Games
Silver medal – second place	2002 Manchester	Men's singles
Asian Games
Bronze medal – third place	2002 Busan	Men's team
Southeast Asian Games
Gold medal – first place	2001 Kuala Lumpur	Men's team

Lee Tsuen Seng
- Traditional Chinese: 李荃生
- Simplified Chinese: 李荃生
Transcriptions
Standard Mandarin
- Hanyu Pinyin: Lǐ Quánshēng

Lee Tsuen Seng (born 26 April 1979) is a former badminton player from Malaysia. He was part of the Malaysian team that won silver in the 2002 Thomas & Uber Cup. He also won a silver medal in men's singles at the 2002 Commonwealth Games.

== Achievements ==
=== Commonwealth Games ===
Men's singles
Year	Venue	Opponent	Score	Result
2002	Bolton Arena; Manchester, England	(Malaysia) Muhd Hafiz Hashim	3–7, 1–7, 7–3, 8–7, 4–7	Silver

=== BWF Grand Prix ===
The BWF Grand Prix has two levels, the BWF Grand Prix and Grand Prix Gold. It is a series of badminton tournaments sanctioned by the Badminton World Federation (BWF) since 2007. The World Badminton Grand Prix sanctioned by International Badminton Federation (IBF) from 1983 to 2006.

Men's singles
Year	Tournament	Opponent	Score	Result
2001	Swiss Open	(Malaysia) Roslin Hashim	11–15, 6–15	(silver) Runner-up
2001	Indonesia Open	(Indonesia) Marleve Mainaky	8–6, 5–7, 3–7, 3–7	(silver) Runner-up
2001	Dutch Open	(China) Bao Chunlai	7–1, 1–7, 7–5, 7–4	(gold) Winner
2002	Dutch Open	(Malaysia) Wong Choong Hann	6–15, 6–15	(silver) Runner-up
2006	New Zealand Open	(Singapore) Ronald Susilo	21–18, 21–13	(gold) Winner
2006	Bulgaria Open	(Denmark) Kasper Ødum	21–17, 21–23, 19–21	(silver) Runner-up
2007	US Open	(Japan) Yousuke Nakanishi	21–14, 21–10	(gold) Winner
2007	Bitburger Open	(China) Lü Yi	21–23, 21–19, 15–21	(silver) Runner-up
2008	New Zealand Open	(Malaysia) Sairul Amar Ayob	24–22, 21–17	(gold) Winner

BWF Grand Prix Gold tournament
BWF Grand Prix tournament
