= 2009 India Open Grand Prix Gold =

Tournament details
- Dates: 24–29 March
- Level: Grand Prix Gold
- Venue: G.M.C. Balayogi SATS Indoor Stadium
- Location: Hyderabad, Andhra Pradesh, India

Champions
- Men's singles: (Indonesia) Taufik Hidayat
- Women's singles: (France) Pi Hongyan
- Men's doubles: (Malaysia) Choong Tan Fook (Malaysia) Lee Wan Wah
- Women's doubles: (China) Ma Jin (China) Wang Xiaoli
- Mixed doubles: (Indonesia) Flandy Limpele (Indonesia) Vita Marissa

The 2009 India Open Grand Prix Gold (officially known as the Yonex-Sunrise India Open 2009 for sponsorship reasons) was a badminton tournament which took place at G.M.C. Balayogi SATS Indoor Stadium in Hyderabad, Andhra Pradesh, India from 24 to 29 March 2009.

== Men's singles ==
=== Seeds ===
1. (Malaysia) Lee Chong Wei (first round)
2. (Indonesia) Taufik Hidayat (champion)
3. (India) Chetan Anand (second round)
4. (Vietnam) Nguyễn Tiến Minh (second round)
5. (Indonesia) Andre Kurniawan Tedjono (quarter-finals)
6. (England) Andrew Smith (withdrew)
7. (Malaysia) Sairul Amar Ayob (third round)
8. (Malaysia) Lee Tsuen Seng (quarter-finals)
9. (India) Arvind Bhat (third round)
10. (Malaysia) Muhammad Hafiz Hashim (final)
11. (England) Carl Baxter (withdrew)
12. (England) Rajiv Ouseph (withdrew)
13. (India) Anup Sridhar (third round)
14. (Malaysia) Chong Wei Feng (second round)
15. (India) Parupalli Kashyap (first round)
16. (India) Anand Pawar (third round)

=== Finals ===
Quarter-finals
(China) Chen Long | 21 | 21
8 | (Malaysia) Lee Tsuen Seng | 15 | 8
10 | (Malaysia) Muhammad Hafiz Hashim | 21 | 14 | 21
5 | (Indonesia) Andre Kurniawan Tedjono | 18 | 21 | 16
(Indonesia) Tommy Sugiarto | 13 | 21 | 21
(Malaysia) Tan Chun Seang | 21 | 18 | 9
(Malaysia) Kuan Beng Hong | 21 | 17 | 19
2 | (Indonesia) Taufik Hidayat | 17 | 21 | 21

Semi-finals
(China) Chen Long | 18 | 21 | 15
10 | (Malaysia) Muhammad Hafiz Hashim | 21 | 19 | 21
(Indonesia) Tommy Sugiarto | 13 | 11
2 | (Indonesia) Taufik Hidayat | 21 | 21

Final
10 | (Malaysia) Muhammad Hafiz Hashim | 18 | 19
2 | (Indonesia) Taufik Hidayat | 21 | 21

== Women's singles ==
=== Seeds ===
1. (France) Pi Hongyan (champion)
2. (India) Saina Nehwal (quarter-finals)
3. (Malaysia) Wong Mew Choo (quarter-finals)
4. (Indonesia) Maria Kristin Yulianti (first round)
5. (Malaysia) Julia Wong Pei Xian (final)
6. (Japan) Yu Hirayama (semi-finals)
7. (Singapore) Xing Aiying (first round)
8. (Malaysia) Lydia Cheah Li Ya (quarter-finals)

=== Finals ===
Semi-finals
1 | (France) Pi Hongyan | 21 | 21
6 | (Japan) Yu Hirayama | 7 | 14
(Singapore) Zhang Beiwen | 21 | 13 | 15
5 | (Malaysia) Julia Wong Pei Xian | 19 | 21 | 21

Final
1 | (France) Pi Hongyan | 17 | 21 | 21
5 | (Malaysia) Julia Wong Pei Xian | 21 | 15 | 14

== Men's doubles ==
=== Seeds ===
1. (Malaysia) Choong Tan Fook / Lee Wan Wah (champion)
2. (Malaysia) Chan Chong Ming / Chew Choon Eng (second round)
3. (Indonesia) Fernando Kurniawan / Lingga Lie (second round)
4. (India) Rupesh Kumar / Sanave Thomas (second round)
5. (Indonesia) Joko Riyadi / Candra Wijaya (semi-finals)
6. (Malaysia) Hoon Thien How / Lin Woon Fui (quarter-finals)
7. (Malaysia) Khoo Chung Chiat / Ong Soon Hock (quarter-finals)
8. (Japan) Naoki Kawamae / Shōji Satō (second round)

=== Finals ===
Semi-finals
1 | (Malaysia) Choong Tan Fook (Malaysia) Lee Wan Wah | 21 | 22
5 | (Indonesia) Joko Riyadi (Indonesia) Candra Wijaya | 6 | 20
(Indonesia) Hendra Aprida Gunawan (Indonesia) Alvent Yulianto | 13 | 15
(Singapore) Hendri Kurniawan Saputra (Singapore) Hendra Wijaya | 21 | 21

Final
1 | (Malaysia) Choong Tan Fook (Malaysia) Lee Wan Wah | 21 | 21
(Singapore) Hendri Kurniawan Saputra (Singapore) Hendra Wijaya | 9 | 11

== Women's doubles ==
=== Seeds ===
1. (Singapore) Shinta Mulia Sari / Yao Lei (quarter-finals)
2. (Singapore) Frances Liu / Vanessa Neo (second round)
3. (India) Jwala Gutta / Shruti Kurien (semi-finals)
4. (France) Laura Choinet / Weny Rahmawati (quarter-finals)

=== Finals ===
Semi-finals
(Indonesia) Vita Marissa (Indonesia) Nadya Melati | 21 | 21
3 | (India) Jwala Gutta (India) Shruti Kurien | 17 | 9
(Indonesia) Jo Novita (Indonesia) Endang Nursugianti | 9 | 6
(China) Ma Jin (China) Wang Xiaoli | 21 | 21

Final
(Indonesia) Vita Marissa (Indonesia) Nadya Melati | 14 | 13
(China) Ma Jin (China) Wang Xiaoli | 21 | 21

== Mixed doubles ==
=== Seeds ===
1. (Hong Kong) Yohan Hadikusumo Wiratama / Chau Hoi Wah (quarter-finals)
2. (India) Valiyaveetil Diju / Jwala Gutta (final)
3. (Indonesia) Flandy Limpele / Vita Marissa (champion)
4. (France) Baptiste Carême / Laura Choinet (second round)

=== Finals ===
Semi-finals
(Indonesia) Tontowi Ahmad (Indonesia) Richi Puspita Dili | 10 | 19
3 | (Indonesia) Flandy Limpele (Indonesia) Vita Marissa | 21 | 21
(Malaysia) Ong Jian Guo (Malaysia) Chong Sook Chin | 11 | 12
2 | (India) Valiyaveetil Diju (India) Jwala Gutta | 21 | 21

Final
3 | (Indonesia) Flandy Limpele (Indonesia) Vita Marissa | 21 | 21
2 | (India) Valiyaveetil Diju (India) Jwala Gutta | 14 | 17
