= 2015 Vietnam Open Grand Prix =

Tournament details
- Dates: 24 – 30 August 2015
- Level: Grand Prix
- Total prize money: US$50,000
- Venue: Nguyen Du Stadium
- Location: Ho Chi Minh City, Vietnam

Champions
- Men's singles: (Indonesia) Tommy Sugiarto
- Women's singles: (Japan) Saena Kawakami
- Men's doubles: (China) Li Junhui (China) Liu Yuchen
- Women's doubles: (Thailand) Jongkongphan Kittiharakul (Thailand) Rawinda Prajongjai
- Mixed doubles: (China) Huang Kaixiang (China) Huang Dongping

The 2015 Vietnam Open Grand Prix was the eleventh grand prix gold and grand prix tournament of the 2015 BWF Grand Prix and Grand Prix Gold. The tournament was held at the Nguyen Du Stadium in Ho Chi Minh City, Vietnam on 24–30 August 2015 and had a total purse of $50,000.

== Men's singles ==
=== Seeds ===
1. (Indonesia) Tommy Sugiarto (champion)
2. (South Korea) Lee Hyun-il (final)
3. (China) Xue Song (first round)
4. (India) Ajay Jayaram (second round)
5. (India) B. Sai Praneeth (second round)
6. (South Korea) Lee Dong-keun (third round)
7. (Vietnam) Nguyễn Tiến Minh (third round)
8. (Indonesia) Jonatan Christie (second round)
9. (Indonesia) Andre Kurniawan Tedjono (first round)
10. (Malaysia) Chong Wei Feng (Semi final)
11. (Malaysia) Zulfadli Zulkiffli (second round)
12. (Russia) Vladimir Malkov (first round)
13. (India) R. M. V. Gurusaidutt (second round)
14. (Singapore) Derek Wong Zi Liang (first round)
15. (Czech Republic) Petr Koukal (second round)
16. (Chinese Taipei) Wang Tzu-wei (third round)

=== Finals ===
Quarterfinals
1	(Indonesia) Tommy Sugiarto	21	21
(Indonesia) Alamsyah Yunus	13	19
(South Korea) Jeon Hyeok-jin	17	21	19
(Indonesia) Anthony Sinisuka Ginting	21	13	21
10	(Malaysia) Chong Wei Feng	22	21
(Japan) Kenta Nishimoto	20	15
(India) Sameer Verma	15	22
2	(South Korea) Lee Hyun-il	21	24

Semifinals
1	(Indonesia) Tommy Sugiarto	21	21
(Indonesia) Anthony Sinisuka Ginting	14	19
10	(Malaysia) Chong Wei Feng	22	15
2	(South Korea) Lee Hyun-il	24	21

Final
1	(Indonesia) Tommy Sugiarto	21	21
2	(South Korea) Lee Hyun-il	19	19

=== Top half ===
==== Section 1 ====
First Round
1	(Indonesia) Tommy Sugiarto	21	21
(Malaysia) Ai Wei Jian	12	13
(Thailand) Sitthikom Thammasin	21	12	21
(Chinese Taipei) Hsueh Hsuan-yi	12	21	8
13	(India) R. M. V. Gurusaidutt	23	21
(Thailand) Khosit Phetpradab	21	19
(Malaysia) Goh Soon Huat	11	21
(Indonesia) Wisnu Yuli Prasetyo	21	23

Second Round
1	(Indonesia) Tommy Sugiarto	21	21
(Thailand) Sitthikom Thammasin	9	10
13	(India) R. M. V. Gurusaidutt	16	21	13
(Indonesia) Wisnu Yuli Prasetyo	21	15	21

Third Round
1	(Indonesia) Tommy Sugiarto	21	21
(Indonesia) Wisnu Yuli Prasetyo	9	16

==== Section 2 ====
First Round
6	(South Korea) Lee Dong-keun	15	22	21
(Indonesia) Evert Sukamta	21	20	14
(Indonesia) Reksy Aureza Megananda	21	15	21
(United States) Howard Shu	15	21	12
12	(Russia) Vladimir Malkov	18	10
PFQ	(Thailand) Kantaphon Wangcharoen	21	21
(Indonesia) Alamsyah Yunus	19	21	21
(Hong Kong) Tam Chun Hei	21	19	11

Second Round
6	(South Korea) Lee Dong-keun	21	21
(Indonesia) Reksy Aureza Megananda	18	13
PFQ	(Thailand) Kantaphon Wangcharoen	21	16	18
(Indonesia) Alamsyah Yunus	16	21	21

Third Round
6	(South Korea) Lee Dong-keun	19	15
(Indonesia) Alamsyah Yunus	21	21

==== Section 3 ====
First Round
3	(China) Xue Song	13	18
(South Korea) Jeon Hyeok-jin	21	21
(Chinese Taipei) Lu Chia-hung	16	21	16
(South Korea) Kim Dong-hoon	21	15	21
15	(Czech Republic) Petr Koukal	21	21
Q5	(Malaysia) Zulhelmi Zulkiffli	15	14
(Indonesia) Shesar Hiren Rhustavito	24	21
Q3	(Malaysia) Lim Zhen Ting	22	5

Second Round
(South Korea) Jeon Hyeok-jin	19	21	21
(South Korea) Kim Dong-hoon	21	15	15
15	(Czech Republic) Petr Koukal	23	21	20
(Indonesia) Shesar Hiren Rhustavito	25	14	22

Third Round
(South Korea) Jeon Hyeok-jin	21	21
(Indonesia) Shesar Hiren Rhustavito	19	11

==== Section 4 ====
First Round
5	(India) B. Sai Praneeth	21	21
Q1	(Vietnam) Nguyễn Hoàng Nam	10	18
(India) Anand Pawar	14	21	16
(Indonesia) Muhammad Bayu Pangisthu	21	18	21
11	(Malaysia) Zulfadli Zulkiffli	21	21
(Chinese Taipei) Lin Chia-hsuan	4	18
(Indonesia) Anthony Sinisuka Ginting	16	21	21
(Malaysia) Soong Joo Ven	21	14	13

Second Round
5	(India) B. Sai Praneeth	19	21	16
(Indonesia) Muhammad Bayu Pangisthu	21	19	21
11	(Malaysia) Zulfadli Zulkiffli	16	12
(Indonesia) Anthony Sinisuka Ginting	21	21

Third Round
(Indonesia) Muhammad Bayu Pangisthu	21	11	14
(Indonesia) Anthony Sinisuka Ginting	15	21	21

=== Bottom half ===
==== Section 5 ====
First Round
(South Korea) Heo Kwang-hee	21	21
Q4	(South Korea) Seo Seung-jae	19	15
(Hong Kong) Chan Yan Kit	17	5
10	(Malaysia) Chong Wei Feng	21	21
(Thailand) Kantawat Leelavechabutr	21	24
Q8	(Chinese Taipei) Chen Chun-wei	19	22
(Malaysia) Liew Daren	10	21	11
7	(Vietnam) Nguyễn Tiến Minh	21	13	21

Second Round
(South Korea) Heo Kwang-hee	21	16	18
10	(Malaysia) Chong Wei Feng	19	21	21
(Thailand) Kantawat Leelavechabutr	20	15
7	(Vietnam) Nguyễn Tiến Minh	22	21

Third Round
10	(Malaysia) Chong Wei Feng	21	9	21
7	(Vietnam) Nguyễn Tiến Minh	15	21	14

==== Section 6 ====
First Round
(Thailand) Suppanyu Avihingsanon	17	21	21
(Indonesia) Ihsan Maulana Mustofa	21	15	19
(Indonesia) Thomi Azizan Mahbub	21	19	22
14	(Singapore) Derek Wong Zi Liang	18	21	20
(Japan) Kenta Nishimoto	21	21
(Chinese Taipei) Shih Kuei-chun	12	17
(Indonesia) Firman Abdul Kholik	18	21	17
4	(India) Ajay Jayaram	21	14	21

Second Round
(Thailand) Suppanyu Avihingsanon	21	13	19
(Indonesia) Thomi Azizan Mahbub	18	21	21
(Japan) Kenta Nishimoto	21	13	21
4	(India) Ajay Jayaram	15	21	18

Third Round
(Indonesia) Thomi Azizan Mahbub	13	16
(Japan) Kenta Nishimoto	21	21

==== Section 7 ====
First Round
(Malaysia) Mohd Arif Abdul Latif
(India) Subhankar Dey	w	/	o
Q6	(India) Shreyansh Jaiswal	21	21
9	(Indonesia) Andre Kurniawan Tedjono	15	13
(India) Sameer Verma	21	21
Q2	(Malaysia) Muhammad Hafiz Hashim	16	18
(Malaysia) Chiang Jiann Shiarng	13	14
8	(Indonesia) Jonatan Christie	21	21

Second Round
(Malaysia) Mohd Arif Abdul Latif	16	21	15
Q6	(India) Shreyansh Jaiswal	21	19	21
(India) Sameer Verma	16	21	22
8	(Indonesia) Jonatan Christie	21	19	20

Third Round
Q6	(India) Shreyansh Jaiswal	22	24	17
(India) Sameer Verma	20	26	21

==== Section 8 ====
First Round
PFQ	(South Korea) Lee Hong-je	13	21	21
(Malaysia) Tan Chun Seang	21	16	18
(China) Qiao Bin	17	18
16	(Chinese Taipei) Wang Tzu-wei	21	21
Q7	(Thailand) Adulrach Namkul	21	15	21
(China) Huang Yuxiang	19	21	14
(China) Guo Kai	15	11
2	(South Korea) Lee Hyun-il	21	21

Second Round
PFQ	(South Korea) Lee Hong-je	18	21	9
16	(Chinese Taipei) Wang Tzu-wei	21	12	21
Q7	(Thailand) Adulrach Namkul	11	9
2	(South Korea) Lee Hyun-il	21	21

Third Round
16	(Chinese Taipei) Wang Tzu-wei	11	14
2	(South Korea) Lee Hyun-il	21	21

== Women's singles ==
=== Seeds ===
1. (Thailand) Busanan Ongbumrungpan (second round)
2. (Spain) Beatriz Corrales (Walkover)
3. (Thailand) Porntip Buranaprasertsuk (quarter-final)
4. (South Korea) Kim Hyo-min (first round)
5. (Indonesia) Lindaweni Fanetri (withdrew)
6. (United States) Iris Wang (withdrew)
7. (Chinese Taipei) Hsu Ya-ching (first round)
8. (United States) Rong Schafer (first round)

=== Finals ===
Semifinals
(Indonesia) Fitriani	21	21
(Chinese Taipei) Cheng Chi-ya	19	19
Q4	(Japan) Saena Kawakami	21	21
(Thailand) Supanida Katethong	14	10

Final
(Indonesia) Fitriani	24	21	10
Q4	(Japan) Saena Kawakami	26	18	21

=== Top half ===
==== Section 1 ====
First Round
1	(Thailand) Busanan Ongbumrungpan	21	14	21
(Vietnam) Vu Thi Trang	9	21	18
Q1	(South Korea) Ko Eun-byeol	16	21	21
(Indonesia) Fitriani	21	15	23
PFQ	(Chinese Taipei) Lee Chia-hsin	21	21
(Malaysia) Lydia Cheah Li Ya	17	13
Q2	(South Korea) Lee Jang-mi	21	14	11
(Thailand) Nichaon Jindapon	19	21	21

Second Round
1	(Thailand) Busanan Ongbumrungpan	21	19	16
(Indonesia) Fitriani	19	21	21
PFQ	(Chinese Taipei) Lee Chia-hsin	21	13	21
(Thailand) Nichaon Jindapon	16	21	15

Quarterfinals
(Indonesia) Fitriani	21	14	21
PFQ	(Chinese Taipei) Lee Chia-hsin	11	21	12

==== Section 2 ====
First Round
4	(South Korea) Kim Hyo-min	14	16
(Singapore) Liang Xiaoyu	21	21
PFQ	(Malaysia) Ho Yen Mei	15	15
(Chinese Taipei) Cheng Chi-ya	21	21
PFQ	(Iran) Sorayya Aghaei	15	12
(Indonesia) Ruselli Hartawan	21	21
(China) Yao Xue	21	21
Q3	(Japan) Natsuki Nidaira	15	13

Second Round
(Singapore) Liang Xiaoyu	21	13	10
(Chinese Taipei) Cheng Chi-ya	19	21	21
(Indonesia) Ruselli Hartawan	18	13
(China) Yao Xue	21	21

Quarterfinals
(Chinese Taipei) Cheng Chi-ya	11	21	24
(China) Yao Xue	21	8	22

=== Bottom half ===
==== Section 3 ====
First Round
(Singapore) Chen Jiayuan	27	21
(China) Shen Yaying	25	18
Q4	(Japan) Saena Kawakami	22	21	23
7	(Chinese Taipei) Hsu Ya-ching	24	10	21
(Malaysia) Tee Jing Yi	21	21
(Chinese Taipei) Hung Shih-han	18	12
(Malaysia) Sannatasah Saniru	9	10
3	(Thailand) Porntip Buranaprasertsuk	21	21

Second Round
(Singapore) Chen Jiayuan	12	11
Q4	(Japan) Saena Kawakami	21	21
(Malaysia) Tee Jing Yi	16	13
3	(Thailand) Porntip Buranaprasertsuk	21	21

Quarterfinals
Q4	(Japan) Saena Kawakami	16	21	23
3	(Thailand) Porntip Buranaprasertsuk	21	16	21

==== Section 4 ====
First Round
(Thailand) Supanida Katethong	23	21
(Australia) Wendy Chen Hsuan-yu	21	6
(Indonesia) Dinar Dyah Ayustine	21	21
8	(United States) Rong Schafer	14	14
(Thailand) Pornpawee Chochuwong
(India) Saili Rane	w	/	o
(Indonesia) Hanna Ramadini
2	(Spain) Beatriz Corrales	w	/	o

Second Round
(Thailand) Supanida Katethong	21	21
(Indonesia) Dinar Dyah Ayustine	14	17
(Thailand) Pornpawee Chochuwong	20	21	16
(Indonesia) Hanna Ramadini	22	18	21

Quarterfinals
(Thailand) Supanida Katethong	21	22
(Indonesia) Hanna Ramadini	19	20

== Men's doubles ==
=== Seeds ===
1. (China) Li Junhui / Liu Yuchen (champion)
2. (Indonesia) Andrei Adistia / Hendra Aprida Gunawan (Semi final)
3. (India) P. J. Chopra / Akshay Dewalkar (second round)
4. (Indonesia) Markus Fernaldi Gideon / Kevin Sanjaya Sukamuljo (Semi final)
5. (Malaysia) Koo Kien Keat / Tan Boon Heong (quarter-final)
6. (Malaysia) Hoon Thien How / Lim Khim Wah (first round)
7. (Indonesia) Berry Angriawan / Rian Agung Saputro (second round)
8. (Indonesia) Fajar Alfian / Muhammad Rian Ardianto (quarter-final)

=== Finals ===
Semifinals
1	(China) Li Junhui (China) Liu Yuchen	15	23	21
4	(Indonesia) Markus Fernaldi Gideon (Indonesia) Kevin Sanjaya Sukamuljo	21	21	18
(China) Huang Kaixiang (China) Wang Sijie	21	18	21
2	(Indonesia) Andrei Adistia (Indonesia) Hendra Aprida Gunawan	16	21	16

Final
1	(China) Li Junhui (China) Liu Yuchen	21	21
(China) Huang Kaixiang (China) Wang Sijie	8	16

=== Top half ===
==== Section 1 ====
First Round
1	(China) Li Junhui (China) Liu Yuchen	21	21
(South Korea) Jun Bong-chan (South Korea) Kim Dae-eun	18	15
(Indonesia) Eka Fajar Kusuma (Indonesia) Setyaldi Putra Wibowo	11	17
(Philippines) Peter Gabriel Magnaye (Philippines) Paul Jefferson Vivas	21	21
7	(Indonesia) Berry Angriawan (Indonesia) Rian Agung Saputro	21	21
(Malaysia) Jagdish Singh (Malaysia) Roni Tan Wee Long	14	14
(Malaysia) Darren Isaac Devadass (Malaysia) Vountus Indra Mawan	11	23
Q3	(Singapore) Terry Hee Yong Kai (Singapore) Loh Kean Hean	21	25

Second Round
1	(China) Li Junhui (China) Liu Yuchen	21	21
(Philippines) Peter Gabriel Magnaye (Philippines) Paul Jefferson Vivas	11	15
7	(Indonesia) Berry Angriawan (Indonesia) Rian Agung Saputro	19	21	16
Q3	(Singapore) Terry Hee Yong Kai (Singapore) Loh Kean Hean	21	13	21

Quarterfinals
1	(China) Li Junhui (China) Liu Yuchen
Q3	(Singapore) Terry Hee Yong Kai (Singapore) Loh Kean Hean	w	/	o

==== Section 2 ====
First Round
4	(Indonesia) Markus Fernaldi Gideon (Indonesia) Kevin Sanjaya Sukamuljo	21	21
PFQ	(Malaysia) Zulfaiz Zulkiffli (Malaysia) Zulhelmi Zulkiffli	17	14
(Chinese Taipei) Lee Jhe-huei (Chinese Taipei) Lee Yang	21	21
Q1	(Thailand) Wannawat Ampunsuwan (Thailand) Tinn Isriyanate	14	19
5	(Malaysia) Koo Kien Keat (Malaysia) Tan Boon Heong	21	21
(India) Alwin Francis (India) Arun Vishnu	17	14
Q4	(Japan) Akira Koga (Japan) Taichi Saito	13	21	15
(Chinese Taipei) Lin Chia-yu (Chinese Taipei) Wu Hsiao-lin	21	16	21

Second Round
4	(Indonesia) Markus Fernaldi Gideon (Indonesia) Kevin Sanjaya Sukamuljo	21	21
(Chinese Taipei) Lee Jhe-huei (Chinese Taipei) Lee Yang	14	18
5	(Malaysia) Koo Kien Keat (Malaysia) Tan Boon Heong	25	21
(Chinese Taipei) Lin Chia-yu (Chinese Taipei) Wu Hsiao-lin	23	16

Quarterfinals
4	(Indonesia) Markus Fernaldi Gideon (Indonesia) Kevin Sanjaya Sukamuljo	21	21
5	(Malaysia) Koo Kien Keat (Malaysia) Tan Boon Heong	15	19

=== Bottom half ===
==== Section 3 ====
First Round
(Chinese Taipei) Liao Min-chun (Chinese Taipei) Tseng Min-hao	19	21	15
(Thailand) Bodin Issara (Thailand) Nipitphon Puangpuapech	21	19	21
(South Korea) Chung Eui-seok (South Korea) Kim Duk-young	21	21
6	(Malaysia) Hoon Thien How (Malaysia) Lim Khim Wah	15	16
(China) Huang Kaixiang (China) Wang Sijie	21	21
(Indonesia) Hardianto (Indonesia) Kenas Adi Haryanto	16	19
(Canada) Adrian Liu (Canada) Derrick Ng	13	9
3	(India) Pranav Chopra (India) Akshay Dewalkar	21	21

Second Round
(Thailand) Bodin Issara (Thailand) Nipitphon Puangpuapech	14	14
(South Korea) Chung Eui-seok (South Korea) Kim Duk-young	21	21
(China) Huang Kaixiang (China) Wang Sijie	21	21
3	(India) Pranav Chopra (India) Akshay Dewalkar	12	14

Quarterfinals
(South Korea) Chung Eui-seok (South Korea) Kim Duk-young	21	21	21
(China) Huang Kaixiang (China) Wang Sijie	23	16	23

==== Section 4 ====
First Round
(Chinese Taipei) Liu Wei-chen (Chinese Taipei) Yang Po-han	19	21	21
Q2	(Philippines) Christian Bernardo (Philippines) Alvin Morada	21	16	12
(Malaysia) Chooi Kah Ming (Malaysia) Ow Yao Han	17	28	14
8	(Indonesia) Fajar Alfian (Indonesia) Muhammad Rian Ardianto	21	26	21
(Hong Kong) Or Chin Chung (Hong Kong) Tang Chun Man	18	21	18
(Philippines) Philip Joper Escueta (Philippines) Ronel Estanislao	21	13	21
(Malaysia) Tan Wee Gieen (Malaysia) Teo Ee Yi	21	21	8
2	(Indonesia) Andrei Adistia (Indonesia) Hendra Aprida Gunawan	15	23	21

Second Round
(Chinese Taipei) Liu Wei-chen (Chinese Taipei) Yang Po-han	25	18
8	(Indonesia) Fajar Alfian (Indonesia) Muhammad Rian Ardianto	27	21
(Philippines) Philip Joper Escueta (Philippines) Ronel Estanislao	15	14
2	(Indonesia) Andrei Adistia (Indonesia) Hendra Aprida Gunawan	21	21

Quarterfinals
8	(Indonesia) Fajar Alfian (Indonesia) Muhammad Rian Ardianto	17	21	11
2	(Indonesia) Andrei Adistia (Indonesia) Hendra Aprida Gunawan	21	17	21

== Women's doubles ==
=== Seeds ===
1. (India) Jwala Gutta / Ashwini Ponnappa (withdrew)
2. (Russia) Ekaterina Bolotova / Evgeniya Kosetskaya (withdrew)
3. (Malaysia) Amelia Alicia Anscelly / Soong Fie Cho (second round)
4. (Thailand) Jongkongphan Kittiharakul / Rawinda Prajongjai (champion)
5. (Singapore) Vanessa Neo Yu Yan / Shinta Mulia Sari (withdrew)
6. (Japan) Shiho Tanaka / Koharu Yonemoto (first round)
7. (India) Pradnya Gadre / N. Sikki Reddy (withdrew)
8. (Indonesia) Suci Rizky Andini / Maretha Dea Giovani (final)

=== Finals ===
Semifinals
8	(Indonesia) Suci Rizky Andini (Indonesia) Maretha Dea Giovani	21	21
(Chinese Taipei) Chen Hsiao-huan (Chinese Taipei) Huang Mei-ching	15	17
4	(Thailand) Jongkonphan Kittiharakul (Thailand) Rawinda Prajongjai	18	21	21
PFQ	(Indonesia) Della Destiara Haris (Indonesia) Rizki Amelia Pradipta	21	17	16

Final
8	(Indonesia) Suci Rizky Andini (Indonesia) Maretha Dea Giovani	14	12
4	(Thailand) Jongkonphan Kittiharakul (Thailand) Rawinda Prajongjai	21	21

=== Top half ===
==== Section 1 ====
First Round
PFQ	(Singapore) Elaine Chua Yi Ling (Singapore) Citra Putri Sari Dewi
Q2	BYE
(Chinese Taipei) Cheng Chi-ya (Chinese Taipei) Lee Chia-hsin	21	21
(Indonesia) Weni Anggraini (Indonesia) Pia Zebadiah	16	19
8	(Indonesia) Suci Rizky Andini (Indonesia) Maretha Dea Giovani
Q4	BYE
(Hong Kong) Chan Hung Yung (Hong Kong) Poon Lok Yan	21	21
Q3	(Macau) Gong Xue Xin (Macau) Ng Weng Chi	8	9

Second Round
PFQ	(Singapore) Elaine Chua Yi Ling (Singapore) Citra Putri Sari Dewi	16	15
(Chinese Taipei) Cheng Chi-ya (Chinese Taipei) Lee Chia-hsin	21	21
8	(Indonesia) Suci Rizky Andini (Indonesia) Maretha Dea Giovani	21	21
(Hong Kong) Chan Hung Yung (Hong Kong) Poon Lok Yan	11	18

Quarterfinals
(Chinese Taipei) Cheng Chi-ya (Chinese Taipei) Lee Chia-hsin	14	20
8	(Indonesia) Suci Rizky Andini (Indonesia) Maretha Dea Giovani	21	22

==== Section 2 ====
First Round
3	(Malaysia) Amelia Alicia Anscelly (Malaysia) Soong Fie Cho	21	21
(Thailand) Panjarat Pransopon (Thailand) Sarita Suwannakitborihan	12	19
(Chinese Taipei) Chen Hsiao-huan (Chinese Taipei) Huang Mei-ching
Q1	BYE
PFQ	(South Korea) Chae Yoo-jung (South Korea) Kim Hye-rin	21	22
(Vietnam) Nguyen Thi Sen (Vietnam) Vu Thi Trang	12	20
(Thailand) Chayanit Chaladchalam (Thailand) Phataimas Muenwong	21	21
(Chinese Taipei) Yang Ching-tun (Chinese Taipei) Ye Jing-ya	18	13

Second Round
3	(Malaysia) Amelia Alicia Anscelly (Malaysia) Soong Fie Cho	15	13
(Chinese Taipei) Chen Hsiao-huan (Chinese Taipei) Huang Mei-ching	21	21
PFQ	(South Korea) Chae Yoo-jung (South Korea) Kim Hye-rin	16	21	21
(Thailand) Chayanit Chaladchalam (Thailand) Phataimas Muenwong	21	17	13

Quarterfinals
(Chinese Taipei) Chen Hsiao-huan (Chinese Taipei) Huang Mei-ching	18	21	21
PFQ	(South Korea) Chae Yoo-jung (South Korea) Kim Hye-rin	21	18	15

=== Bottom half ===
==== Section 3 ====
First Round
(Indonesia) Komala Dewi (Indonesia) Vita Marissa	21	22
(Iran) Negin Amiripour (Iran) Sorayya Aghaei	9	20
(Malaysia) Lim Yin Loo (Malaysia) Lee Meng Yean	15	9
PFQ	(Thailand) Savitree Amitrapai (Thailand) Pacharapun Chochuwong	21	21
(Chinese Taipei) Chiang Kai-hsin (Chinese Taipei) Wu Fang-chien	21	17
(Malaysia) Erica Khoo Pei Shan (Malaysia) Ti Wei Chyi	19	13^{r}
(Hong Kong) Chan Tsz Ka (Hong Kong) Yuen Sin Ying	21	14	18
4	(Thailand) Jongkonphan Kittiharakul (Thailand) Rawinda Prajongjai	17	21	21

Second Round
(Indonesia) Komala Dewi (Indonesia) Vita Marissa	21	21
PFQ	(Thailand) Savitree Amitrapai (Thailand) Pacharapun Chochuwong	16	18
(Chinese Taipei) Chiang Kai-hsin (Chinese Taipei) Wu Fang-chien	7	14
4	(Thailand) Jongkonphan Kittiharakul (Thailand) Rawinda Prajongjai	21	21

Quarterfinals
(Indonesia) Komala Dewi (Indonesia) Vita Marissa	8	16
4	(Thailand) Jongkonphan Kittiharakul (Thailand) Rawinda Prajongjai	21	21

==== Section 4 ====
First Round
(Hong Kong) Cheung Ying Mei (Hong Kong) Ng Wing Yung	11	13
(South Korea) Kim So-young (South Korea) Kong Hee-yong	21	21
(Indonesia) Gebby Ristiyani Imawan (Indonesia) Tiara Rosalia Nuraidah	21	17	21
6	(Japan) Shiho Tanaka (Japan) Koharu Yonemoto	8	21	13
(Chinese Taipei) Hsieh Pei-chen (Chinese Taipei) Wu Ti-jung	21	21
(India) Aparna Balan (India) Prajakta Sawant	14	16
PFQ	(Macau) Chan Kit Lei (Macau) Kuan Chi Leng	6	5
PFQ	(Indonesia) Della Destiara Haris (Indonesia) Rizki Amelia Pradipta	21	21

Second Round
(South Korea) Kim So-young (South Korea) Kong Hee-yong	16	17
(Indonesia) Gebby Ristiyani Imawan (Indonesia) Tiara Rosalia Nuraidah	21	21
(Chinese Taipei) Hsieh Pei-chen (Chinese Taipei) Wu Ti-jung	9	10
PFQ	(Indonesia) Della Destiara Haris (Indonesia) Rizki Amelia Pradipta	21	21

Quarterfinals
(Indonesia) Gebby Ristiyani Imawan (Indonesia) Tiara Rosalia Nuraidah	15	21	14
PFQ	(Indonesia) Della Destiara Haris (Indonesia) Rizki Amelia Pradipta	21	12	21

== Mixed doubles ==
=== Seeds ===
1. (Indonesia) Riky Widianto / Richi Puspita Dili (second round)
2. (Indonesia) Praveen Jordan / Debby Susanto (second round)
3. (Singapore) Danny Bawa Chrisnanta / Vanessa Neo Yu Yan (withdrew)
4. (Indonesia) Ronald Alexander / Melati Daeva Oktaviani (second round)
5. (China) Huang Kaixiang / Huang Dongping (champion)
6. (Indonesia) Andrei Adistia / Vita Marissa (quarter-final)
7. (Indonesia) Alfian Eko Prasetya / Annisa Saufika (quarter-final)
8. (Russia) Vitalij Durkin / Nina Vislova (withdrew)

=== Finals ===
Semifinals
Q2	(Thailand) Bodin Issara (Thailand) Savitree Amitrapai	22	18
(South Korea) Choi Sol-gyu (South Korea) Chae Yoo-jung	24	21
5	(China) Huang Kaixiang (China) Huang Dongping	21	21
(Malaysia) Chan Peng Soon (Malaysia) Goh Liu Ying	9	17

Final
(South Korea) Choi Sol-gyu (South Korea) Chae Yoo-jung	19	12
5	(China) Huang Kaixiang (China) Huang Dongping	21	21

=== Top half ===
==== Section 1 ====
First Round
1	(Indonesia) Riky Widianto (Indonesia) Richi Puspita Dili	21	21
(Chinese Taipei) Tseng Min-hao (Chinese Taipei) Ye Jing-ya	15	7
Q2	(Thailand) Bodin Issara (Thailand) Savitree Amitrapai	21	21
(Malaysia) Tan Chee Tean (Malaysia) Lai Shevon Jemie	14	8
7	(Indonesia) Alfian Eko Prasetya (Indonesia) Annisa Saufika	15	21	21
PFQ	(Chinese Taipei) Liu Wei-chen (Chinese Taipei) Huang Mei-ching	21	16	18
(India) Arun Vishnu (India) Aparna Balan	21	16	21
(Indonesia) Hendra Aprida Gunawan (Indonesia) Shendy Puspa Irawati	19	21	14

Second Round
1	(Indonesia) Riky Widianto (Indonesia) Richi Puspita Dili	17	17
Q2	(Thailand) Bodin Issara (Thailand) Savitree Amitrapai	21	21
7	(Indonesia) Alfian Eko Prasetya (Indonesia) Annisa Saufika	21	22
(India) Arun Vishnu (India) Aparna Balan	9	20

Quarterfinals
Q2	(Thailand) Bodin Issara (Thailand) Savitree Amitrapai	13	21	24
7	(Indonesia) Alfian Eko Prasetya (Indonesia) Annisa Saufika	21	12	22

==== Section 2 ====
First Round
PFQ	(New Zealand) Shane Thomas Masinipeni (New Zealand) Maria Mata Masinipeni	5	14
(Chinese Taipei) Lin Chia-yu (Chinese Taipei) Wu Ti-jung	21	21
(Indonesia) Fran Kurniawan (Indonesia) Komala Dewi	21	15	12
(South Korea) Choi Sol-gyu (South Korea) Chae Yoo-jung	15	21	21
PFQ	(Chinese Taipei) Wu Hsiao-lin (Chinese Taipei) Hsieh Pei-chen	18	19
Q4	(Singapore) Loh Kean Hean (Singapore) Elaine Chua Yi Ling	21	21
(Chinese Taipei) Yang Po-han (Chinese Taipei) Yang Ching-tun	20	12
(Indonesia) Hafiz Faisal (Indonesia) Shella Devi Aulia	22	21

Second Round
(Chinese Taipei) Lin Chia-yu (Chinese Taipei) Wu Ti-jung	21	16	13
(South Korea) Choi Sol-gyu (South Korea) Chae Yoo-jung	17	21	21
Q4	(Singapore) Loh Kean Hean (Singapore) Elaine Chua Yi Ling	19	15
(Indonesia) Hafiz Faisal (Indonesia) Shella Devi Aulia	21	21

Quarterfinals
(South Korea) Choi Sol-gyu (South Korea) Chae Yoo-jung	21	21
(Indonesia) Hafiz Faisal (Indonesia) Shella Devi Aulia	11	13

=== Bottom half ===
==== Section 3 ====
First Round
(Japan) Akira Koga (Japan) Koharu Yonemoto	21	21
PFQ	(Hong Kong) Tang Chun Man (Hong Kong) Poon Lok Yan	7	13
(South Korea) Kim Duk-young (South Korea) Kim Hye-rin	19	11
5	(China) Huang Kaixiang (China) Huang Dongping	21	21
(India) Akshay Dewalkar (India) Prajakta Sawant	19	12
(Indonesia) Markis Kido (Indonesia) Pia Zebadiah	21	21
(Chinese Taipei) Liao Min-chun (Chinese Taipei) Chen Hsiao-huan	17	14
4	(Indonesia) Ronald Alexander (Indonesia) Melati Daeva Oktaviani	21	21

Second Round
(Japan) Akira Koga (Japan) Koharu Yonemoto	17	16
5	(China) Huang Kaixiang (China) Huang Dongping	21	21
(Indonesia) Markis Kido (Indonesia) Pia Zebadiah	22	21
4	(Indonesia) Ronald Alexander (Indonesia) Melati Daeva Oktaviani	20	18

Quarterfinals
5	(China) Huang Kaixiang (China) Huang Dongping	14	21	6
(Indonesia) Markis Kido (Indonesia) Pia Zebadiah	21	11	5^{r}

==== Section 4 ====
First Round
PFQ	(China) Wang Sijie (China) Ou Dongni	22	16	21
Q3	(South Korea) Chung Eui-seok (South Korea) Kong Hee-yong	20	21	13
(South Korea) Kim Jae-hwan (South Korea) Kim So-young	20	18
6	(Indonesia) Andrei Adistia (Indonesia) Vita Marissa	22	21
(Malaysia) Chan Peng Soon (Malaysia) Goh Liu Ying	21	10	21
(Indonesia) Irfan Fadhilah (Indonesia) Weni Anggraini	17	21	13
Q1	(Thailand) Parinyawat Thongnuam (Thailand) Phataimas Muenwong	21	18	24
2	(Indonesia) Praveen Jordan (Indonesia) Debby Susanto	19	21	26

Second Round
PFQ	(China) Wang Sijie (China) Ou Dongni	13	21	19
6	(Indonesia) Andrei Adistia (Indonesia) Vita Marissa	21	19	21
(Malaysia) Chan Peng Soon (Malaysia) Goh Liu Ying	21	21
2	(Indonesia) Praveen Jordan (Indonesia) Debby Susanto	16	12

Quarterfinals
6	(Indonesia) Andrei Adistia (Indonesia) Vita Marissa	19	19
(Malaysia) Chan Peng Soon (Malaysia) Goh Liu Ying	21	21

Preceded by 2015 Russia Open Grand Prix	BWF Grand Prix and Grand Prix Gold; 2015 BWF Season	Succeeded by 2015 Thailand Open Grand Prix Gold
