= 2009 Malaysia Open Grand Prix Gold =

Tournament details
- Dates: 23 – 28 June
- Edition: 1st
- Level: Grand Prix Gold
- Total prize money: US$120,000
- Venue: Bandaraya Stadium
- Location: Johor Bahru, Johor, Malaysia

Champions
- Men's singles: (Malaysia) Lee Chong Wei
- Women's singles: (China) Wang Shixian
- Men's doubles: (Malaysia) Koo Kien Keat (Malaysia) Tan Boon Heong
- Women's doubles: (China) Ma Jin (China) Wang Xiaoli
- Mixed doubles: (China) Zheng Bo (China) Ma Jin

The 2009 Malaysia Open Grand Prix Gold was the inaugural edition of the Malaysia Open Grand Prix Gold and fourth grand prix's badminton tournament of the 2009 BWF Grand Prix Gold and Grand Prix. The tournament was held at the Bandaraya Stadium in Johor Bahru, Malaysia from 23 to 28 June 2009 and had a total purse of $120,000.

== Men's singles ==
=== Seeds ===
1. (Malaysia) Lee Chong Wei (champion)
2. (Indonesia) Taufik Hidayat (first round)
3. (India) Chetan Anand (first round)
4. (Malaysia) Lee Tsuen Seng (third round)
5. (Japan) Kenichi Tago (quarter-finals)
6. (Indonesia) Andre Kurniawan Tedjono (quarter-finals)
7. (England) Andrew Smith (second round)
8. (Malaysia) Wong Choong Hann (semi-finals)
9. (India) Arvind Bhat (third round)
10. (Malaysia) Sairul Amar Ayob (first round)
11. (England) Rajiv Ouseph (third round)
12. (India) Kashyap Parupalli (second round)
13. (Malaysia) Muhammad Hafiz Hashim (first round)
14. (Malaysia) Kuan Beng Hong (third round)
15. (England) Carl Baxter (second round)
16. (India) Anup Sridhar (first round)

=== Finals ===
Quarter-finals
1	(Malaysia) Lee Chong Wei	21	21
5	(Japan) Kenichi Tago	9	15
(Hong Kong) Hu Yun	21	21
6	(Indonesia) Andre Kurniawan Tedjono	6	12
8	(Malaysia) Wong Choong Hann	21	21
Q	(China) Gao Huan	15	10
(Malaysia) Tan Chun Seang	14	21	16
(China) Chen Long	21	12	21

Semi-finals
1	(Malaysia) Lee Chong Wei	21	21
(Hong Kong) Hu Yun	9	8
8	(Malaysia) Wong Choong Hann	10	16
(China) Chen Long	21	21

Final
1	(Malaysia) Lee Chong Wei	21	21
(China) Chen Long	16	9

== Women's singles ==
=== Seeds ===
1. (France) Pi Hongyan (semi-finals)
2. (India) Saina Nehwal (quarter-finals)
3. (China) Zhu Lin (second round)
4. (Malaysia) Wong Mew Choo (semi-finals)
5. (Germany) Juliane Schenk (quarter-finals)
6. (Japan) Ai Goto (second round)
7. (Singapore) Xing Aiying (quarter-finals)
8. (Malaysia) Lydia Cheah Li Ya (second round)

=== Finals ===
Semi-finals
1	(France) Pi Hongyan	14	15
Q	(China) Wang Shixian	21	21
4	(Malaysia) Wong Mew Choo	18	14
Q	(China) Wang Xin	21	21

Final
Q	(China) Wang Shixian	21	18	21
Q	(China) Wang Xin	16	21	10

== Men's doubles ==
=== Seeds ===
1. (Indonesia) Markis Kido / Hendra Setiawan (withdrew)
2. (Malaysia) Koo Kien Keat / Tan Boon Heong (champion)
3. (Malaysia) Mohd Zakry Abdul Latif / Mohd Fairuzizuan Mohd Tazari (quarter-finals)
4. (England) Chris Adcock / Robert Blair (second round)
5. (Indonesia) Hendra Aprida Gunawan / Alvent Yulianto (semi-finals)
6. (China) Chen Zhiben / Shen Ye (first round)
7. (China) Sun Junjie / Tao Jiaming (quarter-finals)
8. (Singapore) Hendri Kurniawan Saputra / Hendra Wijaya (second round)

=== Finals ===
Semi-finals
(Malaysia) Gan Teik Chai (Malaysia) Tan Bin Shen	21	21
(Malaysia) Mak Hee Chun (Malaysia) Tan Wee Kiong	11	15
5	(Indonesia) Hendra Aprida Gunawan (Indonesia) Alvent Yulianto	13	21	11
2	(Malaysia) Koo Kien Keat (Malaysia) Tan Boon Heong	21	17	21

Final
(Malaysia) Gan Teik Chai (Malaysia) Tan Bin Shen	11	13
2	(Malaysia) Koo Kien Keat (Malaysia) Tan Boon Heong	21	21

== Women's doubles ==
=== Seeds ===
1. (Malaysia) Chin Eei Hui / Wong Pei Tty (final)
2. (Singapore) Shinta Mulia Sari / Yao Lei (second round)
3. (China) Pan Pan / Tian Qing (second round)
4. (Germany) Nicole Grether / (Canada) Charmaine Reid (second round)

=== Finals ===
Semi-finals
1	(Malaysia) Chin Eei Hui (Malaysia) Wong Pei Tty	21	21
(Singapore) Frances Liu (Singapore) Vanessa Neo	10	9
(China) Gao Ling (China) Wei Yili	13	14
(China) Ma Jin (China) Wang Xiaoli	21	21

Final
1	(Malaysia) Chin Eei Hui (Malaysia) Wong Pei Tty	9	11
(China) Ma Jin (China) Wang Xiaoli	21	21

== Mixed doubles ==
=== Seeds ===
1. (India) Valiyaveetil Diju / Jwala Gutta (quarter-finals)
2. (China) Zheng Bo / Ma Jin (champion)
3. (China) Xu Chen / Zhao Yunlei (final)
4. (England) Chris Adcock / Gabrielle White (second round)
5. (Malaysia) Koo Kien Keat / Ng Hui Lin (second round)
6. (Indonesia) Flandy Limpele / (Russia) Anastasia Russkikh (quarter-finals)
7. (Malaysia) Lim Khim Wah / Amelia Alicia Anscelly (second round)
8. (Malaysia) Chan Peng Soon / Goh Liu Ying (first round)

=== Finals ===
Semi-finals
(Indonesia) Hendra Aprida Gunawan (Indonesia) Vita Marissa	12	15
3	(China) Xu Chen (China) Zhao Yunlei	21	21
(China) Zhang Nan (China) Pan Pan	10	22	20
2	(China) Zheng Bo (China) Ma Jin	21	20	22

Final
3	(China) Xu Chen (China) Zhao Yunlei	5^{r}
2	(China) Zheng Bo (China) Ma Jin	5
