= 2009 Macau Open Grand Prix Gold =

Tournament details
- Dates: 18–23 August 2009
- Edition: 4
- Level: Grand Prix Gold
- Total prize money: US$120,000
- Venue: Tap Seac Multi-sports Pavilion
- Location: Macau

Champions
- Men's singles: (Malaysia) Lee Chong Wei
- Women's singles: (China) Wang Yihan
- Men's doubles: (Malaysia) Koo Kien Keat (Malaysia) Tan Boon Heong
- Women's doubles: (China) Du Jing (China) Yu Yang
- Mixed doubles: (China) He Hanbin (China) Yu Yang

The 2009 Macau Open Grand Prix Gold was a badminton tournament which took place at the Tap Seac Multi-sports Pavilion, Macau on 18 to 23 August 2009 and had a total purse of $120,000.

== Men's singles ==
=== Seeds ===
1. (Malaysia) Lee Chong Wei (champion)
2. (China) Chen Jin (semifinals)
3. (Indonesia) Taufik Hidayat (semifinals)
4. (Malaysia) Wong Choong Hann (final)
5. (Hong Kong) Chan Yan Kit (withdrew)
6. (Chinese Taipei) Hsieh Yu-hsing (quarterfinals)
7. (India) Chetan Anand (quarterfinals)
8. (Denmark) Jan Ø. Jørgensen (third round)
9. (Malaysia) Lee Tsuen Seng (first round)
10. (India) Arvind Bhat (quarterfinals)
11. (China) Chen Long (second round)
12. (England) Andrew Smith (first round)
13. (Germany) Marc Zwiebler (withdrew)
14. (India) Parupalli Kashyap (second round)
15. (China) Gong Weijie (third round)
16. (Malaysia) Sairul Amar Ayob (second round)

=== Finals ===
Quarterfinals
1	(Malaysia) Lee Chong Wei	21	21
7	(India) Chetan Anand	10	14
3	(Indonesia) Taufik Hidayat	21	21
6	(Chinese Taipei) Hsieh Yu-hsing	16	14
10	(India) Arvind Bhat	19	21	6
4	(Malaysia) Wong Choong Hann	21	18	21
(Hong Kong) Hu Yun	10	19
2	(China) Chen Jin	21	21

Semifinals
1	(Malaysia) Lee Chong Wei	21	22
3	(Indonesia) Taufik Hidayat	18	20
4	(Malaysia) Wong Choong Hann	21	6	21
2	(China) Chen Jin	13	21	11

Final
1	(Malaysia) Lee Chong Wei	21	21
4	(Malaysia) Wong Choong Hann	15	19

== Women's singles ==
=== Seeds ===
1. (Hong Kong) Zhou Mi (second round)
2. (China) Wang Lin (quarterfinals)
3. (China) Wang Yihan (champion)
4. (France) Pi Hongyan (withdrew)
5. (Hong Kong) Wang Chen (semifinals)
6. (China) Jiang Yanjiao (final)
7. (Germany) Juliane Schenk (semifinals)
8. (Hong Kong) Yip Pui Yin (quarterfinals)

=== Finals ===
Semifinals
7	(Germany) Juliane Schenk	21	7
3	(China) Wang Yihan	23	21
6	(China) Jiang Yanjiao	21	21
5	(Hong Kong) Wang Chen	9	14

Final
3	(China) Wang Yihan	16	22	21
6	(China) Jiang Yanjiao	21	20	12

== Men's doubles ==
=== Seeds ===
1. (Malaysia) Koo Kien Keat / Tan Boon Heong (champion)
2. (Malaysia) Choong Tan Fook / Lee Wan Wah (final)
3. (Indonesia) Hendra Aprida Gunawan / Alvent Yulianto (second round)
4. (Chinese Taipei) Chen Hung-ling / Lin Yu-lang (second round)
5. (China) Sun Junjie / Tao Jiaming (quarterfinals)
6. (Indonesia) Candra Wijaya / Rendra Wijaya (second round)
7. (Chinese Taipei) Fang Chieh-min / Lee Sheng-mu (second round)
8. (Malaysia) Chan Chong Ming / Chew Choon Eng (quarterfinals)

=== Finals ===
Semifinals
1	(Malaysia) Koo Kien Keat (Malaysia) Tan Boon Heong	21	21
(China) Chai Biao (China) Zhang Nan	14	16
(Indonesia) Wifqi Windarto (Indonesia) Afiat Yuris Wirawan	13	15
2	(Malaysia) Choong Tan Fook (Malaysia) Lee Wan Wah	21	21

Final
1	(Malaysia) Koo Kien Keat (Malaysia) Tan Boon Heong	21	17	21
2	(Malaysia) Choong Tan Fook (Malaysia) Lee Wan Wah	14	21	12

== Women's doubles ==
=== Seeds ===
1. (China) Du Jing / Yu Yang (champion)
2. (Singapore) Shinta Mulia Sari / Yao Lei (quarterfinals)
3. (China) Yang Wei / Zhang Jiewen (final)
4. (China) Ma Jin / Wang Xiaoli (quarterfinals)
5. (China) Gao Ling / Wei Yili (semifinals)
6. (Denmark) Helle Nielsen / Marie Røpke (quarterfinals)
7. (China) Wang Siyun / Zhang Jinkang (quarterfinals)
8. (Macau) Zhang Dan / Zhang Zhibo (semifinals)

=== Finals ===
Semifinals
1	(China) Du Jing (China) Yu Yang	21	21
8	(Macau) Zhang Dan (Macau) Zhang Zhibo	10	17
3	(China) Yang Wei (China) Zhang Jiewen	21	21
5	(China) Gao Ling (China) Wei Yili	13	18

Final
1	(China) Du Jing (China) Yu Yang	21	21
3	(China) Yang Wei (China) Zhang Jiewen	16	11

== Mixed doubles ==
=== Seeds ===
1. (China) He Hanbin / Yu Yang (champion)
2. (India) Valiyaveetil Diju / Jwala Gutta (withdrew)
3. (Hong Kong) Yohan Hadikusumo Wiratama / Chau Hoi Wah (quarterfinals)
4. (Denmark) Mikkel Delbo Larsen / Mie Schjøtt-Kristensen (semifinals)
5. (China) Chen Zhiben / Zhang Jinkang (semifinals)
6. (Chinese Taipei) Wang Chia-min / Wang Pei-rong (first round)
7. (Malaysia) Ong Jian Guo / Chong Sook Chin (second round)
8. (United States) Halim Haryanto / Peng Yun (first round)

=== Finals ===
Semifinals
1	(China) He Hanbin (China) Yu Yang	21	21
4	(Denmark) Mikkel Delbo Larsen (Denmark) Mie Schjøtt-Kristensen	14	10
5	(China) Chen Zhiben (China) Zhang Jinkang	22	21	13
(Indonesia) Hendra Aprida Gunawan (Indonesia) Vita Marissa	24	17	21

Final
1	(China) He Hanbin (China) Yu Yang	21	21
(Indonesia) Hendra Aprida Gunawan (Indonesia) Vita Marissa	14	9

Preceded by New Zealand Open	BWF Grand Prix Gold and Grand Prix; 2009 season	Succeeded by Chinese Taipei Open
