= 2010 Chinese Taipei Open Grand Prix Gold =

2010 badminton tournament

2010 Chinese Taipei Open
Tournament details
- Dates: 3–8 August
- Level: Grand Prix Gold
- Total prize money: US$200,000
- Venue: Xinzhuang Gymnasium
- Location: Xinzhuang, New Taipei City, Taiwan

Champions
- Men's singles: (Indonesia) Simon Santoso
- Women's singles: (Chinese Taipei) Cheng Shao-chieh
- Men's doubles: (South Korea) Jung Jae-sung (South Korea) Lee Yong-dae
- Women's doubles: (South Korea) Kim Min-jung (South Korea) Lee Hyo-jung
- Mixed doubles: (Indonesia) Hendra Aprida Gunawan (Indonesia) Vita Marissa

The 2010 Chinese Taipei Open Grand Prix Gold was a badminton tournament that took place at the Xinzhuang Gymnasium in Xinzhuang, New Taipei City, Taiwan, from 3 to 8 August 2010 and had a total prize of $200,000.

== Tournament ==
The 2010 Chinese Taipei Open was the ninth tournament of the BWF Grand Prix Gold and Grand Prix and also part of the Chinese Taipei Open championships, which had been held annually since 1980. This tournament was organized by the Chinese Taipei Badminton Association and sanctioned by the BWF.

=== Venue ===
This tournament was held at the Xinzhuang Gymnasium in Xinzhuang, New Taipei City, Taiwan.

=== Point distribution ===
Below is the point distribution table for each phase of the tournament based on the BWF points system for the BWF Grand Prix Gold event.

Winner	Runner-up	3/4	5/8	9/16	17/32	33/64	65/128
7,000	5,950	4,900	3,850	2,750	1,670	660	320

=== Prize money ===
The total prize money for this tournament was US$200,000. The prize money of the 2010 Chinese Taipei Open equivalent to Superseries event, but BWF still categorized this tournament as Grand Prix Gold event.

== Men's singles ==
=== Seeds ===
1. (Vietnam) Nguyễn Tiến Minh (semi-finals)
2. (Indonesia) Sony Dwi Kuncoro (quarter-finals)
3. (Indonesia) Simon Santoso (champion)
4. (Thailand) Boonsak Ponsana (second round)
5. (Malaysia) Wong Choong Hann (third round)
6. (Hong Kong) Hu Yun (third round)
7. (Malaysia) Muhammad Hafiz Hashim (quarter-finals)
8. (Hong Kong) Chan Yan Kit (second round)

=== Finals ===
Semi-finals
1	(Vietnam) Nguyễn Tiến Minh	16	18
3	(Indonesia) Simon Santoso	21	21
(Indonesia) Dionysius Hayom Rumbaka	17	19
(South Korea) Son Wan-ho	21	21

Final
3	(Indonesia) Simon Santoso	21	21
(South Korea) Son Wan-ho	14	11

== Women's singles ==
=== Seeds ===
1. (Netherlands) Yao Jie (withdrew)
2. (Hong Kong) Yip Pui Yin (withdrew)
3. (South Korea) Bae Seung-hee (final)
4. (South Korea) Bae Yeon-ju (semi-finals)
5. (Thailand) Salakjit Ponsana (second round)
6. (Japan) Sayaka Sato (second round)
7. (South Korea) Sung Ji-hyun (second round)
8. (Scotland) Susan Egelstaff (first round)

=== Finals ===
Semi-finals
(Chinese Taipei) Cheng Shao-chieh	21	21
4	(South Korea) Bae Yeon-ju	14	14
3	(South Korea) Bae Seung-hee	21	15	21
(Indonesia) Aprilia Yuswandari	19	21	18

Final
(Chinese Taipei) Cheng Shao-chieh	21	24	21
3	(South Korea) Bae Seung-hee	11	26	17

== Men's doubles ==
=== Seeds ===
1. (Malaysia) Koo Kien Keat / Tan Boon Heong (semi-finals)
2. (Indonesia) Hendra Aprida Gunawan / Alvent Yulianto (first round)
3. (South Korea) Jung Jae-sung / Lee Yong-dae (champions)
4. (Chinese Taipei) Fang Chieh-min / Lee Sheng-mu (semi-finals)
5. (Malaysia) Choong Tan Fook / Lee Wan Wah (quarter-finals)
6. (South Korea) Cho Gun-woo / Kwon Yi-goo (Final)
7. (Chinese Taipei) Chen Hung-ling / Lin Yu-lang (quarter-finals)
8. (South Korea) Ko Sung-hyun / Yoo Yeon-seong (second round)

=== Finals ===
Semi-finals
1	(Malaysia) Koo Kien Keat (Malaysia) Tan Boon Heong	23	18	17
3	(South Korea) Jung Jae-sung (South Korea) Lee Yong-dae	21	21	21
4	(Chinese Taipei) Fang Chieh-min (Chinese Taipei) Lee Sheng-mu	19	14
6	(South Korea) Cho Gun-woo (South Korea) Kwon Yi-goo	21	21

Final
3	(South Korea) Jung Jae-sung (South Korea) Lee Yong-dae	22	21
6	(South Korea) Cho Gun-woo (South Korea) Kwon Yi-goo	10	16

== Women's doubles ==
=== Seeds ===
1. (Malaysia) Chin Eei Hui / Wong Pei Tty (quarter-finals)
2. (Chinese Taipei) Cheng Wen-hsing / Chien Yu-chin (semi-finals)
3. (Thailand) Savitree Amitrapai / Vacharaporn Munkit (second round)
4. (Thailand) Duanganong Aroonkesorn / Kunchala Voravichitchaikul (second round)

=== Finals ===
Semi-finals
(Japan) Rie Eto (Japan) Yu Wakita	11	10
(South Korea) Lee Kyung-won (South Korea) Yoo Hyun-young	21	21
(South Korea) Kim Min-jung (South Korea) Lee Hyo-jung	24	18	25
2	(Chinese Taipei) Cheng Wen-hsing (Chinese Taipei) Chien Yu-chin	22	21	23

Final
(South Korea) Lee Kyung-won (South Korea) Yoo Hyun-young	14	20
(South Korea) Kim Min-jung (South Korea) Lee Hyo-jung	21	22

== Mixed doubles ==
=== Seeds ===
1. (Indonesia) Hendra Aprida Gunawan / Vita Marissa (champions)
2. (South Korea) Lee Yong-dae / Lee Hyo-jung (quarter-finals)
3. (Thailand) Songphon Anugritayawon / Kunchala Voravichitchaikul (quarter-finals)
4. (South Korea) Ko Sung-hyun / Ha Jung-eun (second round)
5. (Indonesia) Tontowi Ahmad / Liliyana Natsir (final)
6. (Thailand) Sudket Prapakamol / Saralee Thungthongkam (quarter-finals)
7. (Malaysia) Chan Peng Soon / Goh Liu Ying (second round)
8. (Indonesia) Fran Kurniawan / Pia Zebadiah Bernadet (semi-finals)

=== Finals ===
Semi-finals
1	(Indonesia) Hendra Aprida Gunawan (Indonesia) Vita Marissa	11	21	21
8	(Indonesia) Fran Kurniawan (Indonesia) Pia Zebadiah Bernadet	21	19	16
(Chinese Taipei) Chen Hung-ling (Chinese Taipei) Cheng Wen-hsing	17	13
5	(Indonesia) Tontowi Ahmad (Indonesia) Liliyana Natsir	21	21

Final
1	(Indonesia) Hendra Aprida Gunawan (Indonesia) Vita Marissa	22	14	22
5	(Indonesia) Tontowi Ahmad (Indonesia) Liliyana Natsir	20	21	20
