= Vita Marissa =

Indonesian badminton player (born 1981)

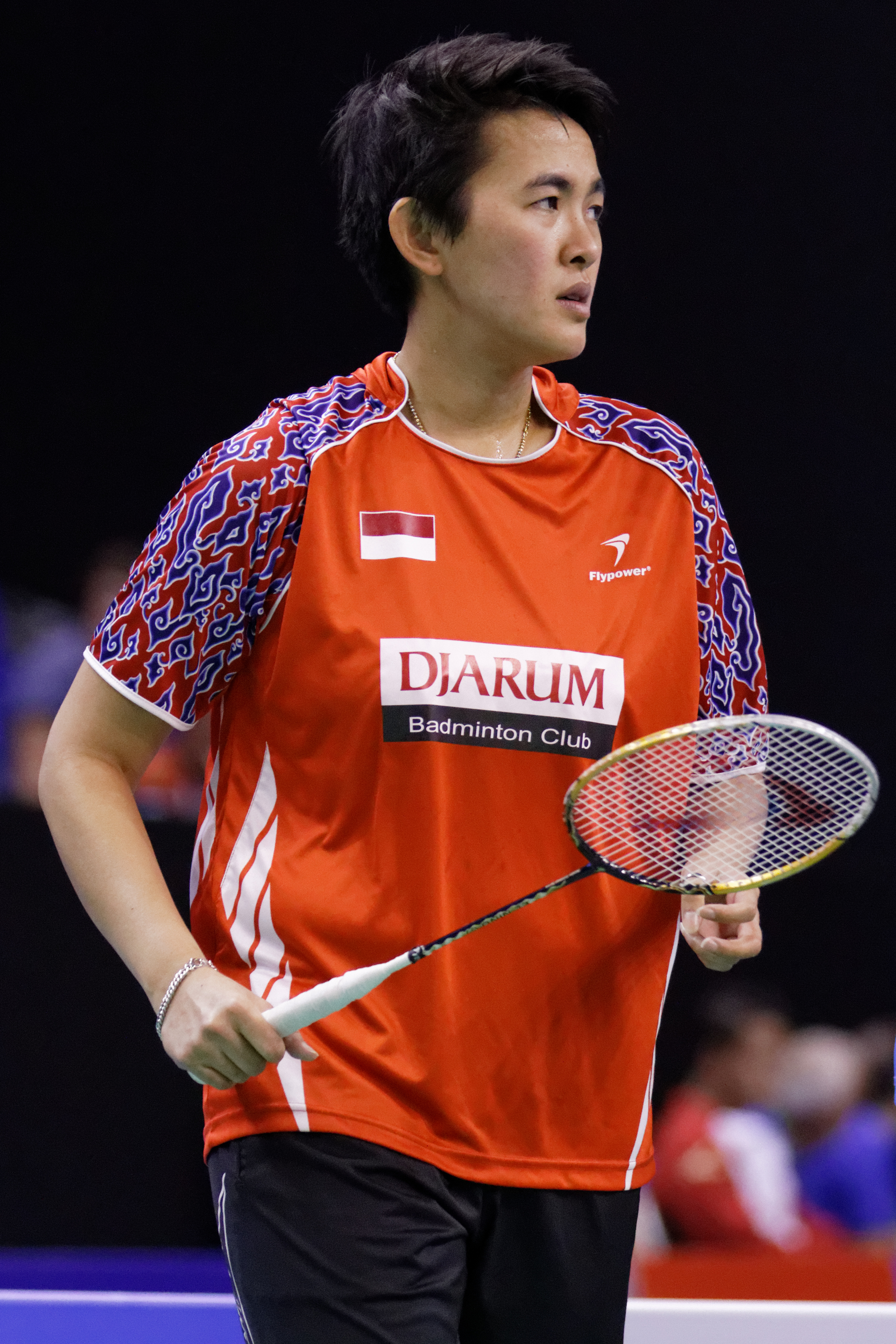
- Vita Marissa at the 2013 French Open Superseries

Personal information
- Born: Vita Marissa; 4 January 1981 (age 45) Jakarta, Indonesia
- Height: 1.71 m (5 ft 7 in)
- Weight: 66 kg (146 lb; 10.4 st)

Sport
- Country: Indonesia
- Sport: Badminton
- Handedness: Right
- Event: Women's & mixed doubles

Women's & mixed doubles
- BWF profile
Medal record
Women's badminton
Representing Indonesia
World Championships
| Bronze medal – third place | 2007 Kuala Lumpur | Mixed doubles |
Sudirman Cup
| Silver medal – second place | 2007 Glasgow | Mixed team |
Uber Cup
| Silver medal – second place | 2008 Jakarta | Women's team |
Asian Games
| Bronze medal – third place | 2002 Busan | Mixed doubles |
Asian Championships
| Gold medal – first place | 2003 Jakarta | Mixed doubles |
| Gold medal – first place | 2008 Johor Bahru | Mixed doubles |
| Silver medal – second place | 2001 Manila | Women's doubles |
| Bronze medal – third place | 2000 Jakarta | Mixed doubles |
| Bronze medal – third place | 2001 Manila | Mixed doubles |
| Bronze medal – third place | 2004 Kuala Lumpur | Mixed doubles |
| Bronze medal – third place | 2008 Johor Bahru | Women's doubles |
SEA Games
| Gold medal – first place | 2001 Kuala Lumpur | Women's doubles |
| Gold medal – first place | 2001 Kuala Lumpur | Mixed doubles |
| Gold medal – first place | 2001 Kuala Lumpur | Women's team |
| Gold medal – first place | 2007 Nakhon Ratchasima | Women's doubles |
| Gold medal – first place | 2007 Nakhon Ratchasima | Mixed doubles |
| Gold medal – first place | 2007 Nakhon Ratchasima | Women's team |
| Silver medal – second place | 2011 Jakarta–Palembang | Women's doubles |
| Silver medal – second place | 2011 Jakarta–Palembang | Women's team |
World Junior Championships
| Bronze medal – third place | 1998 Melbourne | Girls' doubles |
Asian Junior Championships
| Silver medal – second place | 1997 Manila | Girls' team |
| Bronze medal – third place | 1997 Manila | Girls' doubles |
| Bronze medal – third place | 1998 Kuala Lumpur | Girls' doubles |
| Bronze medal – third place | 1998 Kuala Lumpur | Girls' team |

Vita Marissa (born 4 January 1981) is an Indonesian retired badminton player.

== Career ==
Marissa competed in badminton at the 2004 Summer Olympics in mixed doubles with partner Nova Widianto. They had a bye in the first round and defeated Robert Blair and Natalie Munt of Great Britain in the second. In the quarterfinals, Marissa and Widianto lost to Jens Eriksen and Mette Schjoldager of Denmark 15–12, 15–8. In September 2008 Marissa and her new partner Muhammad Rijal won in mixed doubles at the Japan Super Series after beating Nova Widianto/Liliyana Natsir 14–21, 21–15, 21–19 in the all Indonesian final.

In early 2009, she resigned from the Indonesia National Team and is no longer a PBSI player.

She continues her career as independent professional with her partner Flandy Limpele and her friend Nadya Melati, also a former national team player in women's doubles.

=== Olympic Games ===
- 2008 Summer Olympics at the Beijing University of Technology Gymnasium, Beijing, China

2008 Summer Olympics – Mixed doubles
| Round | Partner | Opponent | Score | Result |
|---|---|---|---|---|
| First Round | (Indonesia) Flandy Limpele [3] | (Germany) Kristof Hopp (Germany) Birgit Overzier | 21–12, 21–12 | Win |
| Quarterfinal | (Indonesia) Flandy Limpele [3] | (Denmark) Thomas Laybourn (Denmark) Kamilla Rytter Juhl | 21–17, 15–21, 21–17 | Win |
| Semifinal | (Indonesia) Flandy Limpele [3] | (South Korea) Lee Yong-dae (South Korea) Lee Hyo-jung | 9-21, 21–12, 17–21 | Lost |
| Bronze-final | (Indonesia) Flandy Limpele [3] | (China) He Hanbin [4] (China) Yu Yang | 21–19, 17–21, 21–23 | Lost (4th) |

2008 Summer Olympics – Women's doubles
| Round | Partner | Opponent | Score | Result |
|---|---|---|---|---|
| First round | (Indonesia) Liliyana Natsir | (China) Yang Wei [1] (China) Zhang Jiewen | 19–21, 15–21 | Lost |

- 2004 Summer Olympics at the Goudi Olympic Hall, Athens, Greece

2004 Summer Olympics – Mixed doubles
| Round | Partner | Opponent | Score | Result |
|---|---|---|---|---|
| First round | (Indonesia) Nova Widianto [8] | - | Bye | Win |
| Second Round | (Indonesia) Nova Widianto [8] | (United Kingdom) Robert Blair (United Kingdom) Natalie Munt | 15–8, 15–12 | Win |
| Quarterfinal | (Indonesia) Nova Widianto [8] | (Denmark) Jens Eriksen (Denmark) Mette Schjoldager | 12–15, 8–15 | Lost |

=== Participation with Indonesian team ===
- 4 times at Sudirman Cup (1999, 2003, 2005, 2007)

== Achievements ==
=== BWF World Championships ===
Mixed doubles
| Year | Venue | Partner | Opponent | Score | Result |
|---|---|---|---|---|---|
| 2007 | Putra Indoor Stadium, Kuala Lumpur, Malaysia | (Indonesia) Flandy Limpele | (China) Zheng Bo (China) Gao Ling | 21–17, 19–21, 19–21 | Bronze |

=== Asian Games ===
Mixed doubles
| Year | Venue | Partner | Opponent | Score | Result |
|---|---|---|---|---|---|
| 2002 | Gangseo Gymnasium; Busan, South Korea | (Indonesia) Nova Widianto | (Thailand) Khunakorn Sudhisodhi (Thailand) Saralee Thungthongkam | 11–5, 5–11, 5–11 | Bronze |

=== Asian Championships ===
Women's doubles
| Year | Venue | Partner | Opponent | Score | Result |
|---|---|---|---|---|---|
| 2001 | PhilSports Arena; Manila, Philippines | (Indonesia) Deyana Lomban | (China) Gao Ling (China) Huang Sui | 15–12, 4–15, 6–15 | Silver |
| 2008 | Bandaraya Stadium; Johor Bahru, Malaysia | (Indonesia) Liliyana Natsir | (China) Yang Wei (China) Zhang Jiewen | 10–21, 10–21 | Bronze |

Mixed doubles
| Year | Venue | Partner | Opponent | Score | Result |
|---|---|---|---|---|---|
| 2000 | Istora Senayan; Jakarta, Indonesia | (Indonesia) Tri Kusharjanto | (Indonesia) Wahyu Agung (Indonesia) Emma Ermawati | 14–17, 3–15 | Bronze |
| 2001 | PhilSports Arena; Manila, Philippines | (Indonesia) Tony Gunawan | (South Korea) Kim Dong-moon (South Korea) Ra Kyung-min | 15–12, 13–15, 9–15 | Bronze |
| 2003 | Tennis Indoor Gelora Bung Karno; Jakarta, Indonesia | (Indonesia) Nova Widianto | (Indonesia) Anggun Nugroho (Indonesia) Eny Widiowati | 15–2, 15–11 | Gold |
| 2004 | Kuala Lumpur Badminton Stadium; Kuala Lumpur, Malaysia | (Indonesia) Nova Widianto | (South Korea) Kim Dong-moon (South Korea) Ra Kyung-min | 15–13, 7–15, 3–15 | Bronze |
| 2008 | Bandaraya Stadium; Johor Bahru, Malaysia | (Indonesia) Flandy Limpele | (Indonesia) Nova Widianto (Indonesia) Liliyana Natsir | 21–17, 21–17 | Gold |

=== SEA Games ===
Women's doubles
| Year | Venue | Partner | Opponent | Score | Result |
|---|---|---|---|---|---|
| 2001 | Malawati Stadium; Selangor, Malaysia | (Indonesia) Deyana Lomban | (Malaysia) Ang Li Peng (Malaysia) Lim Pek Siah | 15–5, 4–15, 15–9 | Gold |
| 2007 | Wongchawalitkul University; Nakhon Ratchasima, Thailand | (Indonesia) Liliyana Natsir | (Indonesia) Jo Novita (Indonesia) Greysia Polii | 21–15, 21–14 | Gold |
| 2011 | Istora Senayan; Jakarta, Indonesia | (Indonesia) Nadya Melati | (Indonesia) Anneke Feinya Agustin (Indonesia) Nitya Krishinda Maheswari | 19–21, 17–21 | Silver |

Mixed doubles
| Year | Venue | Partner | Opponent | Score | Result |
|---|---|---|---|---|---|
| 2001 | Malawati Stadium; Selangor, Malaysia | (Indonesia) Nova Widianto | (Indonesia) Bambang Suprianto (Indonesia) Emma Ermawati | 3–15, 15–7, 17–15 | Gold |
| 2007 | Wongchawalitkul University; Nakhon Ratchasima, Thailand | (Indonesia) Flandy Limpele | (Thailand) Sudket Prapakamol (Thailand) Saralee Thungthongkam | 21–14, 21–15 | Gold |

=== World Junior Championships ===
Girls' doubles
| Year | Venue | Partner | Opponent | Score | Result |
|---|---|---|---|---|---|
| 1998 | Sports and Aquatic Centre; Melbourne, Australia | (Indonesia) Eny Widiowati | (China) Gong Ruina (China) Huang Sui | 15–17, 13–15 | Bronze |

=== Asian Junior Championships ===
Girls' doubles
| Year | Venue | Partner | Opponent | Score | Result |
|---|---|---|---|---|---|
| 1997 | Ninoy Aquino Stadium; Manila, Philippines | (Indonesia) Eny Widiowati | (China) Gao Ling (China) Yang Wei | 10–15, 12–15 | Bronze |
| 1998 | Kuala Lumpur Badminton Stadium; Kuala Lumpur, Malaysia | (Indonesia) Eny Widiowati | (China) Gong Ruina (China) Huang Sui | 16–17, 15–17 | Bronze |

=== BWF Superseries (5 titles, 5 runners-up) ===
The BWF Superseries, which was launched on 14 December 2006 and implemented in 2007, was a series of elite badminton tournaments, sanctioned by the Badminton World Federation (BWF). BWF Superseries levels were Superseries and Superseries Premier. A season of Superseries consisted of twelve tournaments around the world that had been introduced since 2011. Successful players were invited to the Superseries Finals, which were held at the end of each year.

Marissa played with many partners such as Nova Widianto, Liliyana Natsir, Muhammad Rijal and Flandy Limpele.

Women's doubles
| Year | Tournament | Partner | Opponent | Score | Result |
|---|---|---|---|---|---|
| 2007 | Malaysia Open | (Indonesia) Greysia Polii | (China) Gao Ling (China) Huang Sui | 21–19, 12–21, 11–21 | (silver) Runner-up |
| 2007 | China Masters | (Indonesia) Liliyana Natsir | (China) Yang Wei (China) Zhao Tingting | 12–21, 21–15, 21–16 | (gold) Winner |
| 2008 | Indonesia Open | (Indonesia) Liliyana Natsir | (Japan) Miyuki Maeda (Japan) Satoko Suetsuna | 21–15, 21–14 | (gold) Winner |
| 2008 | World Superseries Masters Finals | (Indonesia) Liliyana Natsir | (Malaysia) Chin Eei Hui (Malaysia) Wong Pei Tty | 15–21, 20–22 | (silver) Runner-up |
| 2011 | Indonesia Open | (Indonesia) Nadya Melati | (China) Wang Xiaoli (China) Yu Yang | 12–21, 10–21 | (silver) Runner-up |

Mixed doubles
| Year | Tournament | Partner | Opponent | Score | Result |
|---|---|---|---|---|---|
| 2007 | Singapore Open | (Indonesia) Flandy Limpele | (Thailand) Sudket Prapakamol (Thailand) Saralee Thungthongkam | 21–14, 21–13 | (gold) Winner |
| 2007 | French Open | (Indonesia) Flandy Limpele | (China) Xie Zhongbo (China) Zhang Yawen | 21–11, 21–15 | (gold) Winner |
| 2008 | Korea Open | (Indonesia) Flandy Limpele | (South Korea) Lee Yong-dae (South Korea) Lee Hyo-jung | 21–15, 14–21, 18–21 | (silver) Runner-up |
| 2008 | Japan Open | (Indonesia) Muhammad Rijal | (Indonesia) Nova Widianto (Indonesia) Liliyana Natsir | 14–21, 21–15, 21–19 | (gold) Winner |
| 2009 | French Open | (Indonesia) Hendra Aprida Gunawan | (Indonesia) Nova Widianto (Indonesia) Liliyana Natsir | 7–21, 7–21 | (silver) Runner-up |

BWF Super Series Finals tournament
BWF Super Series Premier tournament
BWF Super Series tournament

=== BWF Grand Prix (15 titles, 20 runners-up) ===
The BWF Grand Prix had two levels, the Grand Prix and Grand Prix Gold. It was a series of badminton tournaments sanctioned by the Badminton World Federation (BWF) and played between 2007 and 2017. The World Badminton Grand Prix was sanctioned by the International Badminton Federation from 1983 to 2006.

Women's doubles
| Year | Tournament | Partner | Opponent | Score | Result |
|---|---|---|---|---|---|
| 1999 | Thailand Open | (Indonesia) Emma Ermawati | (China) Gao Ling (China) Qin Yiyuan | 8–15, 2–15 | (silver) Runner-up |
| 2001 | Indonesia Open | (Indonesia) Deyana Lomban | (Denmark) Jane F. Bramsen (Denmark) Ann-Lou Jørgensen | 7–5, 7–5, 7–3 | (gold) Winner |
| 2007 | Chinese Taipei Open | (Indonesia) Liliyana Natsir | (Chinese Taipei) Cheng Wen-hsing (Chinese Taipei) Chien Yu-chin | 15–21, 21–17, 18–21 | (silver) Runner-up |
| 2009 | India Open | (Indonesia) Nadya Melati | (China) Ma Jin (China) Wang Xiaoli | 14–21, 13–21 | (silver) Runner-up |
| 2009 | Chinese Taipei Open | (United States) Mona Santoso | (China) Yang Wei (China) Zhang Jiewen | 14–21, 9–21 | (silver) Runner-up |
| 2013 | Australia Open | (Indonesia) Aprilsasi Putri Lejarsar Variella | (Thailand) Savitree Amitrapai (Thailand) Sapsiree Taerattanachai | 21–19, 21–15 | (gold) Winner |
| 2013 | Malaysia Grand Prix Gold | (Indonesia) Aprilsasi Putri Lejarsar Variella | (Indonesia) Pia Zebadiah Bernadet (Indonesia) Rizki Amelia Pradipta | 17–21, 21–16, 17–21 | (silver) Runner-up |
| 2014 | U.S. Open | (Indonesia) Shendy Puspa Irawati | (Thailand) Puttita Supajirakul (Thailand) Sapsiree Taerattanachai | 21–15, 21–10 | (gold) Winner |
| 2014 | Indonesian Masters | (Indonesia) Shendy Puspa Irawati | (Indonesia) Keshya Nurvita Hanadia (Indonesia) Devi Tika Permatasari | 23–21, 21–13 | (gold) Winner |
| 2014 | Dutch Open | (Indonesia) Shendy Puspa Irawati | (Netherlands) Eefje Muskens (Netherlands) Selena Piek | 8–11, 11–4, 9–11, 10–11 | (silver) Runner-up |

Mixed doubles
| Year | Tournament | Partner | Opponent | Score | Result |
|---|---|---|---|---|---|
| 2001 | Indonesia Open | (Indonesia) Nova Widianto | (Indonesia) Tri Kusharjanto (Indonesia) Emma Ermawati | 5–7, 1–7, 2–7 | (silver) Runner-up |
| 2002 | Indonesia Open | (Indonesia) Nova Widianto | (Indonesia) Bambang Suprianto (Indonesia) Minarti Timur | 7–11, 3–11 | (silver) Runner-up |
| 2002 | Chinese Taipei Open | (Indonesia) Nova Widianto | (Indonesia) Tri Kusharjanto (Indonesia) Emma Ermawati | 11–8, 11–13, 7–11 | (silver) Runner-up |
| 2002 | Japan Open | (Indonesia) Nova Widianto | (South Korea) Kim Dong-moon (South Korea) Ra Kyung-min | 3–7, 2–7, 2–7 | (silver) Runner-up |
| 2002 | Denmark Open | (Indonesia) Nova Widianto | (South Korea) Kim Dong-moon (South Korea) Hwang Yu-mi | 6–11, 11–4, 7–11 | (silver) Runner-up |
| 2003 | Chinese Taipei Open | (Indonesia) Nova Widianto | (South Korea) Kim Dong-moon (South Korea) Ra Kyung-min | 7–15, 5–15 | (silver) Runner-up |
| 2004 | Japan Open | (Indonesia) Nova Widianto | (Thailand) Sudket Prapakamol (Thailand) Saralee Thungthongkam | 15–10, 15–13 | (gold) Winner |
| 2005 | Chinese Taipei Open | (Indonesia) Devin Lahardi Fitriawan | (United States) Tony Gunawan (Chinese Taipei) Cheng Wen-hsing | 15–17, 6–15 | (silver) Runner-up |
| 2006 | Japan Open | (Indonesia) Flandy Limpele | (Indonesia) Nova Widianto (Indonesia) Liliyana Natsir | 11–21, 21–18, 21–17 | (gold) Winner |
| 2006 | Dutch Open | (Indonesia) Flandy Limpele | (England) Robert Blair (England) Jenny Wallwork | 18–21 18–21 | (silver) Runner-up |
| 2007 | Chinese Taipei Open | (Indonesia) Flandy Limpele | (Denmark) Thomas Laybourn (Denmark) Kamilla Rytter Juhl | 21–18, 25–23 | (gold) Winner |
| 2009 | Chinese Taipei Open | (Indonesia) Hendra Aprida Gunawan | (India) Valiyaveetil Diju (India) Jwala Gutta | 21–23, 18–21 | (silver) Runner-up |
| 2009 | Macau Open | (Indonesia) Hendra Aprida Gunawan | (China) He Hanbin (China) Yu Yang | 14–21, 9–21 | (silver) Runner-up |
| 2009 | India Open | (Indonesia) Flandy Limpele | (India) Valiyaveetil Diju (India) Jwala Gutta | 21–14, 21–17 | (gold) Winner |
| 2010 | Macau Open | (Indonesia) Hendra Aprida Gunawan | (Indonesia) Tontowi Ahmad (Indonesia) Liliyana Natsir | 14–21, 18–21 | (silver) Runner-up |
| 2010 | Chinese Taipei Open | (Indonesia) Hendra Aprida Gunawan | (Indonesia) Tontowi Ahmad (Indonesia) Liliyana Natsir | 22–20, 14–21, 22–20 | (gold) Winner |
| 2011 | Thailand Open | (Indonesia) Nova Widianto | (Chinese Taipei) Lee Sheng-mu (Chinese Taipei) Chien Yu-chin | 10–21, 21–23 | (silver) Runner-up |
| 2012 | U.S. Open | (United States) Tony Gunawan | (Japan) Kenichi Hayakawa (Japan) Misaki Matsutomo | 21–13, 21–10 | (gold) Winner |
| 2013 | Malaysia Grand Prix Gold | (Indonesia) Praveen Jordan | (Malaysia) Tan Aik Quan (Malaysia) Lai Pei Jing | 20–22, 21–13, 21–17 | (gold) Winner |
| 2013 | New Zealand Open | (Indonesia) Praveen Jordan | (Indonesia) Riky Widianto (Indonesia) Richi Puspita Dili | 21–18, 21–8 | (gold) Winner |
| 2013 | Indonesia Grand Prix Gold | (Indonesia) Praveen Jordan | (Indonesia) Tontowi Ahmad (Indonesia) Liliyana Natsir | 22–20, 9–21, 21–14 | (gold) Winner |
| 2014 | U.S. Open | (Indonesia) Muhammad Rijal | (Thailand) Maneepong Jongjit (Thailand) Sapsiree Taerattanachai | 21–16, 21–19 | (gold) Winner |
| 2014 | Vietnam Open | (Indonesia) Muhammad Rijal | (Indonesia) Irfan Fadhilah (Indonesia) Weni Anggraini | 21–18, 21–10 | (gold) Winner |
| 2014 | Indonesian Masters | (Indonesia) Muhammad Rijal | (Indonesia) Riky Widianto (Indonesia) Richi Puspita Dili | 18–21, 19–21 | (silver) Runner-up |
| 2015 | Canada Open | (Indonesia) Andrei Adistia | (Hong Kong) Lee Chun Hei (Hong Kong) Chau Hoi Wah | 16–21, 18–21 | (silver) Runner-up |

BWF Grand Prix Gold tournament
BWF Grand Prix tournament

=== BWF International Challenge/Series (2 titles, 1 runner-up) ===
Women's doubles
| Year | Tournament | Partner | Opponent | Score | Result |
|---|---|---|---|---|---|
| 1997 | Indonesia International | (Indonesia) Angeline de Pauw | (Indonesia) Anita (Indonesia) Eny Widiowati | 15–12, 15–6 | (gold) Winner |

Mixed doubles
| Year | Tournament | Partner | Opponent | Score | Result |
|---|---|---|---|---|---|
| 2014 | Osaka International | (Indonesia) Muhammad Rijal | (South Korea) Choi Sol-gyu (South Korea) Chae Yoo-jung | 21–18, 17–21, 21–18 | (gold) Winner |
| 2014 | Indonesia International | (Indonesia) Muhammad Rijal | (Indonesia) Ronald Alexander (Indonesia) Melati Daeva Oktavianti | 11–7, 4–11, 6–11, 7–11 | (silver) Runner-up |

BWF International Challenge tournament
BWF International Series tournament

== Performance timeline ==
=== National team ===
- Junior level

| Team event | 1997 | 1998 |
|---|---|---|
| Asian Junior Championships | Silver | Bronze |

- Senior level

| Team event | 2001 | 2007 | 2011 |
|---|---|---|---|
| SEA Games | Gold | Gold | Silver |

| Team event | 2008 |
|---|---|
| Uber Cup | Silver |

| Team event | 2007 |
|---|---|
| Sudirman Cup | Silver |

=== Individual competitions ===
- Junior level

| Event | 1997 | 1998 |
|---|---|---|
| Asian Junior Championships | Bronze (GD) | Bronze (GD) |

| Event | 1998 |
|---|---|
| World Junior Championships | Bronze (GD) |

- Senior level

| Event | 2001 | 2007 | 2011 |
|---|---|---|---|
| SEA Games | Gold (WD); Gold (XD) | Gold (WD); Gold (XD) | Silver (XD) |

| Event | 2000 | 2001 | 2003 | 2004 | 2008 |
|---|---|---|---|---|---|
| Asian Championships | Bronze (XD) | Silver (WD); Bronze (XD) | Gold (XD) | Bronze (XD) | Bronze (WD); Gold (XD) |

| Event | 2002 | 2006 |
|---|---|---|
| Asian Games | QF (WD); Bronze (XD) | QF (WD); R16 (XD) |

| Event | 2001 | 2003 | 2005 | 2006 | 2007 | 2009 | 2010 | 2011 | 2013 | 2014 | 2015 |
|---|---|---|---|---|---|---|---|---|---|---|---|
| World Championships | R3 (WD); QF (XD) | R2 (XD) | A | | R3 (WD); Bronze (XD) | A | R3 (XD) | QF (WD) | A | | R2 (WD) |

| Event | 2004 | 2008 |
|---|---|---|
| Olympic Games | QF (XD) | R1 (WD); 4th (XD) |

| Tournament | BWF Superseries | | | | | | | | | Best |
| Tournament | 2007 | 2008 | 2009 | 2010 | 2011 | 2012 | 2013 | 2014 | 2015 | Best |
|---|---|---|---|---|---|---|---|---|---|---|
| Korea Open | R2 (XD) | QF (WD); F (XD) | A | | R2 (WD); R2 (XD) | R2 (WD); R1 (XD) | R2 (WD); R1 (XD) | R2 (WD); R1 (XD) | R1 (XD) | F (2008) |
| Malaysia Open | F (WD); QF (XD) | R2 (WD); R1 (XD) | QF (WD); R2 (XD) | R1 (WD); QF (XD) | R1 (WD); R1 (XD) | R1 (WD); R1 (XD) | SF (WD); SF (XD) | R2 (WD); R1 (XD) | R1 (XD) | F (2007) |
| All England Open | QF (WD); R2 (XD) | R2 (WD); R1 (XD) | A | QF (XD) | R1 (XD) | R1 (WD); R2 (XD) | R2 (XD) | A | | SF (2003, 2004) |
| Swiss Open | SF (WD) | QF (XD) | A | | GPG | | | | | SF (2007) |
| India Open | —N/a | GPG | | | QF (XD) | R2 (WD) | A | | | W (2009) |
| Indonesia Open | R1 (XD) | W (WD); SF (XD) | R2 (XD) | SF (WD) | F (WD); R1 (XD) | R1 (WD); R2 (XD) | R2 (WD); R1 (XD) | R2 (WD); R1 (XD) | R2 (XD) | W (2001, 2008) |
| Singapore Open | QF (WD); W (XD) | SF (WD); R1 (XD) | A | R2 (WD); SF (XD) | QF (WD); R1 (XD) | R2 (WD); QF (XD) | R1 (WD); SF (XD) | R2 (WD); R1 (XD) | R1 (XD) | W (2007) |
| China Masters | W (WD); R2 (XD) | SF (XD) | A | | R2 (WD); R2 (XD) | A | QF (XD) | GPG | | W (2007) |
| Japan Open | R2 (WD); QF (XD) | SF (WD); W (XD) | SF (XD) | R2 (WD); QF (XD) | R1 (WD); R2 (XD) | A | R1 (WD); QF (XD) | R1 (WD); QF (XD) | R1 (XD) | W (2004, 2006, 2008) |
| Australian Open | IS | | GP | | GPG | | | A | | W (2013) |
| Denmark Open | QF (XD) | A | R2 (XD) | R2 (WD); SF (XD) | R2 (WD); R1 (XD) | R1 (XD) | R1 (XD) | R1 (WD); R1 (XD) | A | F (2002) |
| French Open | W (XD) | QF (WD); R1 (XD) | R2 (WD); F (XD) | R1 (WD); QF (XD) | QF (WD); QF (XD) | R2 (XD) | R1 (WD); QF (XD) | R2 (WD); R1 (XD) | A | W (2007) |
| China Open | QF (WD); QF (XD) | A | w/d | A | R1 (WD); R1 (XD) | A | R1 (WD); R1 (XD) | A | | QF (2007) |
| Hong Kong Open | SF (XD) | QF (WD); R1 (XD) | R1 (WD); SF (XD) | R2 (WD); R1 (XD) | A | | QF (WD); QF (XD) | R1 (WD) | A | SF (2007, 2009) |
| BWF Superseries Finals | —N/a | F (WD); GS (XD) | GS (XD) | GS (XD) | DNQ | | | | | F (2008) |
| Tournament | 2007 | 2008 | 2009 | 2010 | 2011 | 2012 | 2013 | 2014 | 2015 | Best |

| Tournament | BWF Grand Prix and Grand Prix Gold | | | | | | | | | Best |
| Tournament | 2007 | 2008 | 2009 | 2010 | 2011 | 2012 | 2013 | 2014 | 2015 | Best |
|---|---|---|---|---|---|---|---|---|---|---|
| Malaysia Masters | —N/a | | QF (WD); SF (XD) | SF (WD); QF (XD) | R1 (WD); R2 (XD) | A | F (WD); W (XD) | R2 (WD); QF (XD) | R2 (WD); QF (XD) | W (2013) |
| India Open | —N/a | A | F (WD); W (XD) | A | SS | | | | | W (2009) |
| Swiss Open | SS | | | | A | R2 (WD); R1 (XD) | A | R2 (XD) | A | SF (2007) |
| Australian Open | | | | | QF (XD) | QF (WD); R1 (XD) | W (WD); R1 (XD) | SS | | W (2013) |
| New Zealand Open | | | | —N/a | IC | —N/a | SF (WD); W (XD) | A | SF (WD); QF (XD) | W (2013) |
| U.S. Open | | | A | | | SF (WD); W (XD) | A | W (WD); W (XD) | A | W (2012, 2014 WD, 2014 XD) |
| Canada Open | | —N/a | | | | A | | | R2 (WD); F (XD) | F (2015) |
| Chinese Taipei Open | F (WD); W (XD) | | F (WD); F (XD) | R2 (WD); W (XD) | QF (WD); R2 (XD) | A | | | R2 (XD) | W (2007, 2010) |
| Vietnam Open | A | | | | | | | R2 (WD); W (XD) | QF (WD); QF (XD) | W (2014) |
| Thailand Open | | | | —N/a | R2 (WD); F (XD) | QF (WD); R2 (XD) | A | —N/a | R2 (WD); R1 (XD) | F (1999, 2011) |
| Dutch Open | | | A | R2 (WD) | A | | | F (WD); R2 (XD) | A | F (2006, 2014) |
| Macau Open | | | R2 (WD); F (XD) | R2 (WD); F (XD) | R1 (WD); R2 (XD) | A | | | | F (2009, 2010) |
| Indonesian Masters | —N/a | | | SF (WD); QF (XD) | QF (WD); SF (XD) | R2 (WD); R1 (XD) | SF (WD); W (XD) | W (WD); F (XD) | SF (WD); QF (XD) | W (2013, 2014) |
| Tournament | 2007 | 2008 | 2009 | 2010 | 2011 | 2012 | 2013 | 2014 | 2015 | Best |

| Tournament | IBF World Grand Prix | | | | | | | | Best |
| Tournament | 1999 | 2000 | 2001 | 2002 | 2003 | 2004 | 2005 | 2006 | Best |
|---|---|---|---|---|---|---|---|---|---|
| All England Open | | | | | SF (XD) | SF (XD) | A | | SF (2003, 2004) |
| Chinese Taipei Open | | | —N/a | F (XD) | F (XD) | | F (XD) | | F (2002, 2003, 2005) |
| Denmark Open | | SF (XD) | SF (WD); SF (XD) | F (XD) | | | A | R1 (WD); QF (XD) | F (2002) |
| Dutch Open | | R2 (WD); SF (XD) | A | | | | | F (XD) | F (2006) |
| Indonesia Open | SF (WD); QF (XD) | QF (WD) | W (WD); F (XD) | R1 (WD); F (XD) | | A | | R2 (XD) | W (2001) |
| Japan Open | | | | F (XD) | | W (XD) | | W (XD) | W (2004, 2006) |
| Thailand Open | F | | | —N/a | | | | | F (1999) |

== Personal life ==
When Marissa was young, she joined the Tangkas Jakarta badminton club. Her parents were Aris Harsono (father) and Yulianawati (mother). Her hobbies are billiards, swimming, and watching movies. Generally people call her Vita. After she has finished all competitions, no matter what the result were, she always makes a symbol of the Spirit of Jesus Christ. In 2008, as the oldest player in Uber Cup team, she was appointed as the team captain.
