= 2011 Singapore Super Series =

Badminton championships

Tournament details
- Dates: 14 June 2011– 19 June 2011
- Edition: 62nd
- Level: Super Series
- Total prize money: US$200,000
- Venue: Singapore Indoor Stadium
- Location: Kallang, Singapore

Champions
- Men's singles: (China) Chen Jin
- Women's singles: (China) Wang Xin
- Men's doubles: (China) Cai Yun (China) Fu Haifeng
- Women's doubles: (China) Tian Qing (China) Zhao Yunlei
- Mixed doubles: (Indonesia) Tontowi Ahmad (Indonesia) Liliyana Natsir

The 2011 Singapore Super Series was the fifth super series tournament of the 2011 BWF Super Series. The tournament was held in Singapore from 14 to 19 June 2011 and had a total purse of $200,000.

== Men's singles ==
=== Seeds ===
1. (Indonesia) Taufik Hidayat (second round)
2. (China) Lin Dan (final)
3. (China) Chen Long (second round)
4. (Denmark) Peter Gade (semi-finals)
5. (Thailand) Boonsak Ponsana (first round)
6. (Vietnam) Nguyễn Tiến Minh (first round)
7. (China) Bao Chunlai (second round)
8. (South Korea) Park Sung-hwan (second round)

=== Top half ===
First Round
1	(Indonesia) T Hidayat	22	21	21
Q4	(Malaysia) D Liew	24	12	18
(China) Wang ZM	21	21
Q2	(Thailand) T Saensomboonsuk	18	15
7	(China) Bao CL	21	21
(Indonesia) SD Kuncoro	19	13
(Malaysia) Wong CH	23	19
Q1	(Denmark) V Axelsen	25	21
3	(China) Chen L	21	21
(Indonesia) A Yunus	15	7
(Japan) K Yamada	14	13
(South Korea) Lee H-i	21	21
8	(South Korea) Park S-h	21	21
(India) P Kashyap	15	14
(Denmark) H-K Vittinghus	23	9	10
(China) Chen J	21	21	21

Second Round
1	(Indonesia) T Hidayat	16	22	13
(China) Wang ZM	21	20	21
7	(China) Bao CL	21	15
Q1	(Denmark) V Axelsen	23	21
3	(China) Chen L	18	23	18
(South Korea) Lee H-i	21	21	21
8	(South Korea) Park S-h	15	16
(China) Chen J	21	21

Quarterfinals
(China) Wang ZM	21	21
Q1	(Denmark) V Axelsen	15	10
(South Korea) Lee H-i	14	9
(China) Chen J	21	21

Semifinals
(China) Wang ZM	17	11
(China) Chen J	21	21

=== Bottom half ===
First Round
(Germany) M Zwiebler	14	21	21
Q3	(Chinese Taipei) Chou T-c	21	18	19
(China) Du PY	15	21	21
5	(Thailand) B Ponsana	21	13	8
(France) B Leverdez	21	14	17
(England) R Ouseph	19	21	21
(Indonesia) T Sugiarto	11	16
4	(Denmark) P Gade	21	21
(Indonesia) DH Rumbaka	17	21	18
(Japan) S Sasaki	21	17	21
(Indonesia) S Santoso	15	24	21
6	(Vietnam) N Tiến Minh	21	22	17
(Japan) K Tago	19	14
(Denmark) J Ø. Jørgensen	21	21
(South Korea) Shon W-h	14	15
2	(China) Lin D	21	21

Second Round
(Germany) M Zwiebler	16	12
(China) Du PY	21	21
(England) R Ouseph	11	13
4	(Denmark) P Gade	21	21
(Japan) S Sasaki	11	12
(Indonesia) S Santoso	21	21
(Denmark) J Ø. Jørgensen	17	11
2	(China) Lin D	21	21

Quarterfinals
(China) Du PY	15	15
4	(Denmark) P Gade	21	21
(Indonesia) S Santoso	21	13	20
2	(China) Lin D	14	21	22

Semifinals
4	(Denmark) P Gade	22	17	15
2	(China) Lin D	20	21	21

=== Finals ===
Semifinals
(China) Wang Zhengming	17	11
(China) Chen Jin	21	21
4	(Denmark) Peter Gade	22	17	15
2	(China) Lin Dan	20	21	21

Final
(China) Chen Jin	w	/	o
2	(China) Lin Dan

== Women's singles ==
=== Seeds ===
1. (China) Wang Shixian (semi-finals)
2. (China) Wang Yihan (quarter-finals)
3. (China) Wang Xin (champion)
4. (India) Saina Nehwal (second round)
5. (South Korea) Bae Yeon-ju (second round)
6. (Denmark) Tine Baun (final)
7. (Thailand) Porntip Buranaprasertsuk (first round)
8. (Germany) Juliane Schenk (quarter-finals)

=== Top half ===
First Round
1	(China) Wang SX	21	21
Q4	(Singapore) F Mingtian	10	15
(Russia) A Prokopenko	15	8
Q1	(China) Wang L	21	21
8	(Germany) J Schenk	21	21
(Indonesia) L Fanetri	18	16
Q3	(Singapore) C Jiayuan	13	12
(Thailand) R Inthanon	21	21
4	(India) S Nehwal	21	13	21
(China) Lu L	18	21	16
(Bulgaria) P Nedelcheva	17	21	9
(Chinese Taipei) Cheng S-C	21	18	21
6	(Denmark) T Baun	21	21
(Bulgaria) L Zechiri	11	10
(Indonesia) MF Kusumastuti	12	21	16
(Japan) S Sato	21	18	21

Second Round
1	(China) Wang SX	12
Q1	(China) Wang L	8^{r}
8	(Germany) J Schenk	17	21	21
(Thailand) R Inthanon	21	16	18
4	(India) S Nehwal	21	10	19
(Chinese Taipei) Cheng S-c	8	21	21
6	(Denmark) T Baun	21	21
(Japan) S Sato	16	14

Quarterfinals
1	(China) Wang SX	17	21	22
8	(Germany) J Schenk	21	15	20
(Chinese Taipei) Cheng S-c	24	17	13
6	(Denmark) T Baun	22	21	21

Semifinals
1	(China) Wang SX	15	16
6	(Denmark) T Baun	21	21

=== Bottom half ===
First Round
(Singapore) J Gu	14	21	21
(Japan) A Kurihara	21	19	13
(Japan) A Goto	21	21
7	(Thailand) P Buranaprasertsuk	11	7
(Indonesia) A Yuswandari	21	21
(Japan) E Hirose	18	19
(France) Pi H	11	8
3	(China) Wang X	21	21
(Netherlands) Yao J	23	21
(South Korea) Sung J-h	21	15
(Thailand) S Ponsana	15	11
5	(South Korea) Bae Y-j	21	21
Q2	(India) A Pantawane	16	13
(Chinese Taipei) Tai T-y	21	21
(Indonesia) A Firdasari	17	17
2	(China) Wang YH	21	21

Second Round
(Singapore) J Gu	16	21	21
(Japan) A Goto	21	16	15
(Indonesia) A Yuswandari	21	11	14
3	(China) Wang X	18	21	21
(Netherlands) Yao J	21	22
5	(South Korea) Bae Y-j	19	20
(Chinese Taipei) Tai T-y	16	14
2	(China) Wang YH	21	21

Quarterfinals
(Singapore) J Gu	17	12
3	(China) Wang X	21	21
(Netherlands) Yao J	21	15	21
2	(China) Wang YH	17	21	16

Semifinals
3	(China) Wang X	21	21
(Netherlands) Yao J	13	11

=== Finals ===
Semifinals
1	(China) Wang Shixian	15	16
6	(Denmark) Tine Baun	21	21
3	(China) Wang Xin	21	21
(Netherlands) Yao Jie	13	11

Final
6	(Denmark) Tine Baun	19	17
3	(China) Wang Xin	21	21

== Men's doubles ==
=== Seeds ===
1. (Denmark) Mathias Boe / Carsten Mogensen (withdrew)
2. (South Korea) Jung Jae-sung / Lee Yong-dae (semi-finals)
3. (South Korea) Ko Sung-hyun / Yoo Yeon-seong (first round)
4. (China) Cai Yun / Fu Haifeng (champions)
5. (Chinese Taipei) Fang Chieh-min / Lee Sheng-mu (first round)
6. (Indonesia) Markis Kido / Hendra Setiawan (second round)
7. (China) Chai Biao / Guo Zhendong (semi-finals)
8. (Indonesia) Mohammad Ahsan / Bona Septano (second round)

=== Top half ===
First Round
PFQ	(Malaysia) Mak H C (Malaysia) Tan W K	21	16	21
(Thailand) S Anugritayawon (Thailand) S Prapakamol	16	21	12
Q4	(Denmark) R Bonde (Denmark) A Kristiansen	19	21	11
(Japan) H Hashimoto (Japan) N Hirata	21	18	21
5	(Chinese Taipei) Fang C-m (Chinese Taipei) Lee S-m	13	16
(Indonesia) A Y Chandra (Indonesia) H A Gunawan	21	21
(England) A Clark (England) A Langridge	21	17	16
(Chinese Taipei) Chen H-l (Chinese Taipei) Lin Y-l	18	21	21
3	(South Korea) Ko S-h (South Korea) Yoo Y-s	21	16	14
(Germany) I Kindervater (Germany) J Schöttler	13	21	21
(Denmark) M Conrad-Petersen (Denmark) J Rasmussen	21	21
(England) C Adcock (England) A Ellis	15	13
7	(China) Chai B (China) Guo ZD	14	21	21
(South Korea) Kim K-j (South Korea) Shin B-c	21	12	17
(Poland) A Cwalina (Poland) M Łogosz	15	21	27
(Malaysia) Gan T C (Malaysia) Tan B S	21	15	29

Second Round
PFQ	(Malaysia) Mak H C (Malaysia) Tan W K	16	14
(Japan) H Hashimoto (Japan) N Hirata	21	21
(Indonesia) A Y Chandra (Indonesia) H A Gunawan	21	21
(Chinese Taipei) Chen H-l (Chinese Taipei) Lin Y-l	11	19
(Germany) I Kindervater (Germany) J Schöttler	20	21	21
(Denmark) M Conrad-Petersen (Denmark) J Rasmussen	22	19	15
7	(China) Chai B (China) Guo ZD	21	21
(Malaysia) Gan T C (Malaysia) Tan B S	17	18

Quarterfinals
(Japan) H Hashimoto (Japan) N Hirata	17	18
(Indonesia) A Y Chandra (Indonesia) H A Gunawan	21	21
(Germany) I Kindervater (Germany) J Schöttler	15	10
7	(China) Chai B (China) Guo ZD	21	21

Semifinals
(Indonesia) A Y Chandra (Indonesia) H A Gunawan	21	24	21
7	(China) Chai B (China) Guo ZD	19	26	14

=== Bottom half ===
First Round
Q1	(China) Hong W (China) Shen Y	14	21	21
(Japan) Y Hirobe (Japan) K Kazuno	21	19	17
(China) Liu X (China) Qiu Z	15	17
8	(Indonesia) M Ahsan (Indonesia) B Septano	21	21
Q2	(Chinese Taipei) Liao M-c (Chinese Taipei) Wu C-w	21	21
(South Korea) Cho G-w (South Korea) Kwon Y-g	13	15
(Japan) N Kawamae (Japan) S Sato	19	15
4	(China) Cai Y (China) Fu HF	21	21
(Japan) H Endo (Japan) K Hayakawa	21	21
(India) R Kumar K.T. (India) S Thomas	17	16
(United States) H Bach (United States) T Gunawan	18	17
6	(Indonesia) M Kido (Indonesia) H Setiawan	21	21
(Malaysia) M F M Tazari (Malaysia) Ong S H	21	21
Q3	(Malaysia) Goh W S (Malaysia) Lim K W	18	12
(Netherlands) R Bosch (Netherlands) K Ridder	15	12
2	(South Korea) Jung J-s (South Korea) Lee Y-d	21	21

Second Round
Q1	(China) Hong W (China) Shen Y	22	13	21
8	(Indonesia) M Ahsan (Indonesia) B Septano	20	21	18
Q2	(Chinese Taipei) Liao M-c (Chinese Taipei) Wu C-w	14	15
4	(China) Cai Y (China) Fu FH	21	21
(Japan) H Endo (Japan) K Hayakawa	21	21
6	(Indonesia) M Kido (Indonesia) H Setiawan	17	19
(Malaysia) M F M Tazari (Malaysia) Ong S H	17	8
2	(South Korea) Jung J-s (South Korea) Lee Y-d	21	21

Quarterfinals
Q1	(China) Hong W (China) Shen Y	11	16
4	(China) Cai Y (China) Fu HF	21	21
(Japan) H Endo (Japan) K Hayakawa	14	14
2	(South Korea) Jung J-s (South Korea) Lee Y-d	21	21

Semifinals
4	(China) Cai Y (China) Fu HF	21	23
2	(South Korea) Jung J-s (South Korea) Lee Y-d	16	21

=== Finals ===
Semifinals
(Indonesia) Alvent Yulianto Chandra (Indonesia) Hendra Aprida Gunawan	21	24	21
7	(China) Chai Biao (China) Guo Zhendong	19	26	14
4	(China) Cai Yun (China) Fu Haifeng	21	23
2	(South Korea) Jung Jae-sung (South Korea) Lee Yong-dae	16	21

Final
(Indonesia) Alvent Yulianto Chandra (Indonesia) Hendra Aprida Gunawan	17	13
4	(China) Cai Yun (China) Fu Haifeng	21	21

== Women's doubles ==
=== Seeds ===
1. (Japan) Miyuki Maeda / Satoko Suetsuna (quarter-finals)
2. (Japan) Mizuki Fujii / Reika Kakiiwa (semi-finals)
3. (Indonesia) Meiliana Jauhari / Greysia Polii (quarter-finals)
4. (Japan) Shizuka Matsuo / Mami Naito (semi-finals)
5. (China) Tian Qing / Zhao Yunlei (champions)
6. (South Korea) Ha Jung-eun / Kim Min-jung (final)
7. (Thailand) Duanganong Aroonkesorn / Kunchala Voravichitchaikul (withdrew)
8. (Russia) Valeria Sorokina / Nina Vislova (quarter-finals)

=== Top half ===
First Round
1	(Japan) M Maeda (Japan) S Suetsuna	21	17	21
(China) Ma J (China) Pan P	19	21	17
(Australia) L Choo (Australia) R Veeran	21	21
(Singapore) Liang XY (Singapore) Tan WH	14	14
5	(China) Tian Q (China) Zhao YL	21	21
(South Korea) Jang Y-n (South Korea) Kim M-s	17	14
(Singapore) Y Y V Neo (Singapore) Thng TT	21	16	21
(Denmark) L Damkjær Kruse (Denmark) M Røpke	19	21	23
4	(Japan) S Matsuo (Japan) M Naito	21	21
(Canada) A Bruce (Canada) M Li	11	16
(Singapore) Chen JY (Singapore) Xing AY	21	21
(England) J Wallwork (England) G White	16	9
7	(Thailand) D Aroonkesorn (Thailand) K Voravichitchaikul
(Indonesia) V Marissa (Indonesia) N Melati	w	/	o
(Malaysia) Chin E H (Malaysia) Wong P T	21	21
(Netherlands) L Jonathans (Netherlands) P van Dooremalen	14	17

Second Round
1	(Japan) M Maeda (Japan) S Suetsuna	21	21
(Australia) L Choo (Australia) R Veeran	14	8
5	(China) Tian Q (China) Zhao YL	21	21
(Denmark) L Damkjær Kruse (Denmark) M Røpke	13	14
4	(Japan) S Matsuo (Japan) M Naito	21	21
(Singapore) Chen JY (Singapore) Xing AY	12	15
(Indonesia) V Marissa (Indonesia) N Melati	21	21
(Malaysia) Chin E H (Malaysia) Wong P T	12	17

Quarterfinals
1	(Japan) M Maeda (Japan) S Suetsuna	8	12
5	(China) Tian Q (China) Zhao YL	21	21
4	(Japan) S Matsuo (Japan) M Naito	21	21
(Indonesia) V Marissa (Indonesia) N Melati	15	8

Semifinals
5	(China) Tian Q (China) Zhao YL	23	21
4	(Japan) S Matsuo (Japan) M Naito	21	17

=== Bottom half ===
First Round
(South Korea) Jung K-e (South Korea) Kim H-n	21	21
(India) J Gutta (India) A Ponnappa	17	14
(Denmark) C Pedersen (Denmark) K Rytter Juhl	17	13
6	(South Korea) Ha J-e (South Korea) Kim M-j	21	21
(Chinese Taipei) Chang H-y (Chinese Taipei) Lai C-w	15	17
(Germany) S Marinello (Germany) B Michels	21	21
(China) Cheng S (China) Bao Y	18	11
3	(Indonesia) M Jauhari (Indonesia) G Polii	21	21
(Singapore) S Mulia Sari (Singapore) Yao L	19	21	21
(England) M Agathangelou (England) H Olver	21	8	16
(Canada) G Gao (Canada) J Ko	17	7
8	(Russia) V Sorokina (Russia) N Vislova	21	21
(Japan) M Matsutomo (Japan) A Takahashi	21	21
(United States) I Wang (United States) R Wang	9	13
(Chinese Taipei) Hsieh P-c (Chinese Taipei) Wang P-r	12	14
2	(Japan) M Fujii (Japan) R Kakiiwa	21	21

Second Round
(South Korea) Jung K-e (South Korea) Kim H-n	15	21	14
6	(South Korea) Ha J-e (South Korea) Kim M-j	21	17	21
(Germany) S Marinello (Germany) B Michels	15	16
3	(Indonesia) M Jauhari (Indonesia) G Polii	21	21
(Singapore) S Mulia Sari (Singapore) L Yao	21	20	17
8	(Russia) V Sorokina (Russia) N Vislova	14	22	21
(Japan) M Matsutomo (Japan) A Takahashi	21	15	18
2	(Japan) M Fujii (Japan) R Kakiiwa	19	21	21

Quarterfinals
6	(South Korea) Ha J-e (South Korea) Kim M-j	21	21	21
3	(Indonesia) M Jauhari (Indonesia) G Polii	10	23	14
8	(Russia) V Sorokina (Russia) N Vislova	20	13
2	(Japan) M Fujii (Japan) R Kakiiwa	22	21

Semifinals
6	(South Korea) Ha J-e (South Korea) Kim M-j	21	21
2	(Japan) M Fujii (Japan) R Kakiiwa	16	18

=== Finals ===
Semifinals
5	(China) Tian Qing (China) Zhao Yunlei	23	21
4	(Japan) Shizuka Matsuo (Japan) Mami Naito	21	17
6	(South Korea) Ha Jung-eun (South Korea) Kim Min-jung	21	21
2	(Japan) Mizuki Fujii (Japan) Reika Kakiiwa	16	18

Final
5	(China) Tian Qing (China) Zhao Yunlei	21	21
6	(South Korea) Ha Jung-eun (South Korea) Kim Min-jung	13	16

== Mixed doubles ==
=== Seeds ===
1. (China) Zhang Nan / Zhao Yunlei (semi-finals)
2. (Thailand) Sudket Prapakamol / Saralee Thoungthongkam (quarter-finals)
3. (Denmark) Joachim Fischer Nielsen / Christinna Pedersen (first round)
4. (Indonesia) Tontowi Ahmad / Liliyana Natsir (champions)
5. (Denmark) Thomas Laybourn / Kamilla Rytter Juhl (first round)
6. (China) Tao Jiaming / Tian Qing (first round)
7. (Poland) Robert Mateusiak / Nadiezda Zieba (second round)
8. (Thailand) Songphon Anugritayawon / Kunchala Voravichitchaikul (first round)

=== Top half ===
First Round
1	(China) Zhang N (China) Zhao YL	21	15	21
Q3	(Japan) K Hayakawa (Japan) M Matsutomo	13	21	18
(Indonesia) M Rijal (Indonesia) D Susanto	16	21	21
(Japan) H Hashimoto (Japan) M Fujii	21	17	17
8	(Thailand) S Anugritayawon (Thailand) K Voravichitchaikul	18	10
(China) He HB (China) Yu Y	21	21
(South Korea) Kim K-j (South Korea) Jung K-e	16	17
Q4	(South Korea) Yoo Y-s (South Korea) Jang Y-n	21	21
4	(Indonesia) T Ahmad (Indonesia) L Natsir	21	21
Q2	(China) Qiu Z (China) Bao Y	13	12
(China) Xu C (China) Ma J	21	21
(Russia) A Nikolaenko (Russia) V Sorokina	15	18
7	(Poland) R Mateusiak (Poland) N Zieba	12	21	21
(Indonesia) N Widianto (Indonesia) V Marissa	21	15	12
(Germany) M Fuchs (Germany) B Michels	16	16
(South Korea) Lee Y-d (South Korea) Ha J-e	21	21

Second Round
1	(China) Zhang N (China) Zhao YL	21	21
(Indonesia) M Rijal (Indonesia) D Susanto	14	18
(China) He HB (China) Yu Y	21	21
Q4	(South Korea) Yoo Y-s (South Korea) Jang Y-n	18	16
4	(Indonesia) T Ahmad (Indonesia) L Natsir	21	21
(China) Xu C (China) Ma J	14	10
7	(Poland) R Mateusiak (Poland) N Zieba	12	13
(South Korea) Lee Y-d (South Korea) Ha J-e	21	21

Quarterfinals
1	(China) Zhang N (China) Zhao YL	11	21	22
(China) He HB (China) Yu Y	21	19	20
4	(Indonesia) T Ahmad (Indonesia) L Natsir	21	21
(South Korea) Lee Y-d (South Korea) Ha J-e	14	16

Semifinals
1	(China) Zhang N (China) Zhao YL	21	16
4	(Indonesia) T Ahmad (Indonesia) L Natsir	23	21

=== Bottom half ===
First Round
(Chinese Taipei) Lee S-m (Chinese Taipei) Chien Y-c	21	21
Q1	(South Korea) Shin B-c (South Korea) Kim M-j	14	8
(Japan) S Sato (Japan) S Matsuo	21	21
5	(Denmark) T Laybourn (Denmark) K Rytter Juhl	18	19
(Japan) S Ikeda (Japan) R Shiota	21	18	21
(Denmark) MP Kolding (Denmark) J Houmann	16	21	19
(Chinese Taipei) Chen H-l (Chinese Taipei) Cheng W-h	21	21
3	(Denmark) J Fischer Nielsen (Denmark) C Pedersen	15	15
(England) N Robertson (England) J Wallwork	21	21
(Germany) J Schöttler (Germany) S Marinello	17	10
(Indonesia) F Kurniawan (Indonesia) P Z Bernadeth	21	22
6	(China) Tao JM (China) Tian Q	18	20
(Canada) T Ng (Canada) G Gao	13	13
(Scotland) R Blair (England) G White	21	21
(England) C Adcock (Scotland) I Bankier	15	19
2	(Thailand) S Prapakamol (Thailand) S Thoungthongkam	21	21

Second Round
(Chinese Taipei) Lee S-m (Chinese Taipei) Chien Y-c	21	17	11
(Japan) S Sato (Japan) S Matsuo	17	21	21
(Japan) S Ikeda (Japan) R Shiota	14	10
(Chinese Taipei) Chen H-l (Chinese Taipei) Cheng W-h	21	21
(England) N Robertson (England) J Wallwork	21	21
(Indonesia) F Kurniawan (Indonesia) P Z Bernadeth	18	15
(Scotland) R Blair (England) G White	17	13
2	(Thailand) S Prapakamol (Thailand) S Thoungthongkam	21	21

Quarterfinals
(Japan) S Sato (Japan) S Matsuo	21	14	17
(Chinese Taipei) Chen H-l (Chinese Taipei) Cheng W-h	10	21	21
(England) N Robertson (England) J Wallwork	21	21
2	(Thailand) S Prapakamol (Thailand) S Thoungthongkam	15	14

Semifinals
(Chinese Taipei) Chen H-l (Chinese Taipei) Cheng W-h	21	21
(England) N Robertson (England) J Wallwork	12	15

=== Finals ===
Semifinals
1	(China) Zhang Nan (China) Zhao Yunlei	21	16
4	(Indonesia) Tontowi Ahmad (Indonesia) Liliyana Natsir	23	21
(Chinese Taipei) Chen Hung-ling (Chinese Taipei) Cheng Wen-hsing	21	21
(England) Nathan Robertson (England) Jenny Wallwork	12	15

Final
4	(Indonesia) Tontowi Ahmad (Indonesia) Liliyana Natsir	21	27
(Chinese Taipei) Chen Hung-ling (Chinese Taipei) Cheng Wen-hsing	14	25

Preceded by 2010 Singapore Super Series	Singapore Super Series	Succeeded by 2012 Singapore Super Series
Preceded by 2011 India Super Series	BWF Super Series; 2011 season	Succeeded by 2011 Indonesia Super Series Premier
