= 2010 Macau Open Grand Prix Gold =

Tournament details
- Dates: 27 July–1 August 2010
- Edition: 5
- Level: Grand Prix Gold
- Total prize money: US$120,000
- Venue: Cotai Arena in the Venetian
- Location: Macau

Champions
- Men's singles: (Malaysia) Lee Chong Wei
- Women's singles: (China) Li Xuerui
- Men's doubles: (South Korea) Ko Sung-hyun (South Korea) Yoo Yeon-seong
- Women's doubles: (Chinese Taipei) Cheng Wen-hsing (Chinese Taipei) Chien Yu-chin
- Mixed doubles: (Indonesia) Tontowi Ahmad (Indonesia) Liliyana Natsir

The 2010 Macau Open Grand Prix Gold was a badminton tournament which took place at the Cotai Arena in the Venetian, Macau on 27 July to 1 August 2010 and had a total purse of $120,000.

== Men's singles ==
=== Seeds ===
1. (Malaysia) Lee Chong Wei (champion)
2. (Denmark) Peter Gade (withdrew)
3. (Indonesia) Sony Dwi Kuncoro (quarterfinals)
4. (Indonesia) Simon Santoso (semifinals)
5. (Thailand) Boonsak Ponsana (semifinals)
6. (Japan) Kenichi Tago (withdrew)
7. (Malaysia) Wong Choong Hann (third round)
8. (Hong Kong) Hu Yun (third round)
9. (Malaysia) Muhammad Hafiz Hashim (withdrew)
10. (Indonesia) Dionysius Hayom Rumbaka (third round)
11. (Hong Kong) Chan Yan Kit (third round)
12. (India) Parupalli Kashyap (second round)
13. (Chinese Taipei) Hsieh Yu-hsing (quarterfinals)
14. (Thailand) Tanongsak Saensomboonsuk (third round)
15. (South Korea) Son Wan-ho (quarterfinals)
16. (Japan) Kazushi Yamada (third round)

=== Finals ===
Quarterfinals
1 | (Malaysia) Lee Chong Wei | 21 | 21
15 | (South Korea) Son Wan-ho | 16 | 12
4 | (Indonesia) Simon Santoso | 21 | 21
(Hong Kong) Wong Wing Ki | 6 | 5
5 | (Thailand) Boonsak Ponsana | 21 | 16 | 25
3 | (Indonesia) Sony Dwi Kuncoro | 17 | 21 | 23
13 | (Chinese Taipei) Hsieh Yu-hsing | 16 | 15
(South Korea) Lee Hyun-il | 21 | 21

Semifinals
1 | (Malaysia) Lee Chong Wei | 21 | 18 | 21
4 | (Indonesia) Simon Santoso | 12 | 21 | 12
5 | (Thailand) Boonsak Ponsana | 18 | 17
(South Korea) Lee Hyun-il | 21 | 21

Final
1 | (Malaysia) Lee Chong Wei | w | / | o
(South Korea) Lee Hyun-il

== Women's singles ==
=== Seeds ===
1. (China) Lu Lan (withdrew)
2. (Netherlands) Yao Jie (second round)
3. (Japan) Eriko Hirose (quarterfinals)
4. (Hong Kong) Zhou Mi (semifinals)
5. (Hong Kong) Yip Pui Yin (withdrew)
6. (South Korea) Bae Seung-hee (first round)
7. (South Korea) Bae Yeon-ju (first round)
8. (Thailand) Salakjit Ponsana (first round)

=== Finals ===
Semifinals
(Chinese Taipei) Cheng Shao-chieh | 14 | 11
(Indonesia) Adriyanti Firdasari | 21 | 21
4 | (Hong Kong) Zhou Mi | 8 | 21 | 10
(China) Li Xuerui | 21 | 19 | 21

Final
(Indonesia) Adriyanti Firdasari | 18 | 15
(China) Li Xuerui | 21 | 21

== Men's doubles ==
=== Seeds ===
1. (Denmark) Mathias Boe / Carsten Mogensen (withdrew)
2. (Indonesia) Markis Kido / Hendra Setiawan (semifinals)
3. (Indonesia) Hendra Aprida Gunawan / Alvent Yulianto (final)
4. (South Korea) Jung Jae-sung / Lee Yong-dae (first round)
5. (Chinese Taipei) Fang Chieh-min / Lee Sheng-mu (second round)
6. (Malaysia) Choong Tan Fook / Lee Wan Wah (second round)
7. (Japan) Hirokatsu Hashimoto / Noriyasu Hirata (first round)
8. (Chinese Taipei) Chen Hung-ling / Lin Yu-lang (first round)

=== Finals ===
Semifinals
(South Korea) Cho Gun-woo (South Korea) Kwon Yi-goo | 18 | 19
3 | (Indonesia) Hendra Aprida Gunawan (Indonesia) Alvent Yulianto | 21 | 21
(South Korea) Ko Sung-hyun (South Korea) Yoo Yeon-seong | 18 | 21 | 21
2 | (Indonesia) Markis Kido (Indonesia) Hendra Setiawan | 21 | 18 | 11

Final
3 | (Indonesia) Hendra Aprida Gunawan (Indonesia) Alvent Yulianto | 17 | 15
(South Korea) Ko Sung-hyun (South Korea) Yoo Yeon-seong | 21 | 21

== Women's doubles ==
=== Seeds ===
1. (Japan) Miyuki Maeda / Satoko Suetsuna (semifinals)
2. (Malaysia) Chin Eei Hui / Wong Pei Tty (quarterfinals)
3. (Chinese Taipei) Cheng Wen-hsing / Chien Yu-chin (champion)
4. (Japan) Mizuki Fujii / Reika Kakiiwa (first round)
5. (Indonesia) Meiliana Jauhari / Greysia Polii (final)
6. (Macau) Zhang Dan / Zhang Zhibo (semifinals)
7. (Thailand) Savitree Amitrapai / Vacharaporn Munkit (second round)
8. (South Korea) Lee Kyung-won / Yoo Hyun-young (quarterfinals)

=== Finals ===
Semifinals
1 | (Japan) Miyuki Maeda (Japan) Satoko Suetsuna | 11 | 11
3 | (Chinese Taipei) Cheng Wen-hsing (Chinese Taipei) Chien Yu-chin | 21 | 21
6 | (Macau) Zhang Dan (Macau) Zhang Zhibo | 21 | 18 | 18
5 | (Indonesia) Meiliana Jauhari (Indonesia) Greysia Polii | 17 | 21 | 21

Final
3 | (Chinese Taipei) Cheng Wen-hsing (Chinese Taipei) Chien Yu-chin | 16 | 21 | 21
5 | (Indonesia) Meiliana Jauhari (Indonesia) Greysia Polii | 21 | 18 | 16

== Mixed doubles ==
=== Seeds ===
1. (Indonesia) Hendra Aprida Gunawan / Vita Marissa (final)
2. (South Korea) Lee Yong-dae / Lee Hyo-jung (first round)
3. (Thailand) Songphon Anugritayawon / Kunchala Voravichitchaikul (quarterfinals)
4. (Chinese Taipei) Ko Sung-hyun / Ha Jung-eun (quarterfinals)
5. (Denmark) Joachim Fischer Nielsen / Christinna Pedersen (withdrew)
6. (Indonesia) Tontowi Ahmad / Liliyana Natsir (champion)
7. (South Korea) Shin Baek-cheol / Yoo Hyun-young (second round)
8. (Thailand) Sudket Prapakamol / Saralee Thoungthongkam (semifinals)

=== Finals ===
Semifinals
1 | (Indonesia) Hendra Aprida Gunawan (Indonesia) Vita Marissa | 21 | 19 | 21
8 | (Thailand) Sudket Prapakamol (Thailand) Saralee Thoungthongkam | 12 | 21 | 12
(Indonesia) Fran Kurniawan (Indonesia) Pia Zebadiah Bernadeth | 13 | 11
6 | (Indonesia) Tontowi Ahmad (Indonesia) Liliyana Natsir | 21 | 21

Final
1 | (Indonesia) Hendra Aprida Gunawan (Indonesia) Vita Marissa | 14 | 18
6 | (Indonesia) Tontowi Ahmad (Indonesia) Liliyana Natsir | 21 | 21

| Preceded by U.S. Open | BWF Grand Prix Gold and Grand Prix; 2010 season | Succeeded by Chinese Taipei Open |
