= Hendra Aprida Gunawan =

Indonesian badminton player (born 1982)

Personal information
- Born: 6 April 1982 (age 44) Majalengka, West Java, Indonesia
- Height: 1.78 m (5 ft 10 in)
- Weight: 73 kg (161 lb)

Sport
- Country: Indonesia
- Sport: Badminton
- Handedness: Right

Men's & mixed doubles
- Highest ranking: 5 (MD 22 July 2010); 2 (XD 2 December 2010)
- BWF profile
Medal record
Representing Indonesia
Sudirman Cup
Silver medal – second place	2007 Glasgow	Mixed team
Bronze medal – third place	2011 Qingdao	Mixed team
Thomas Cup
Silver medal – second place	2010 Kuala Lumpur	Men's team
Bronze medal – third place	2008 Jakarta	Men's team
Asian Championships
Bronze medal – third place	2001 Manila	Men's doubles
Bronze medal – third place	2005 Hyderabad	Men's doubles
Southeast Asian Games
Gold medal – first place	2007 Nakhon Ratchasima	Men's team
Bronze medal – third place	2007 Nakhon Ratchasima	Men's doubles
World Junior Championships
Bronze medal – third place	2000 Guangzhou	Boys' doubles
Bronze medal – third place	2000 Guangzhou	Mixed doubles
Bronze medal – third place	2000 Guangzhou	Mixed team
Asian Junior Championships
Silver medal – second place	2000 Kyoto	Boys' team
Bronze medal – third place	2000 Kyoto	Boys' doubles

Hendra Aprida Gunawan (born 6 April 1982) is a badminton player from Indonesia who affiliated with the SGS PLN Bandung.

== Career ==
Gunawan competes in men's doubles with Joko Riyadi. They were bronze medalists at the 2005 Asian Badminton Championships, runners-up at the 2006 Dutch Open, and bronze medalists at the 2007 Badminton at the Southeast Asian Games. At the 2007 BWF World Championships they were seeded #14 and were defeated in the third round by Guo Zhendong and Xie Zhongbo, of China, 22–20, 16–21, 21–16.

== Achievements ==
=== Asian Championships ===
Men's doubles
Year	Venue	Partner	Opponent	Score	Result
2001	PhilSports Arena; Manila, Philippines	(Indonesia) Alvent Yulianto	(Indonesia) Tri Kusharyanto (Indonesia) Bambang Suprianto	4–15, 9–15	Bronze
2005	Gachibowli Indoor Stadium; Hyderabad, India	(Indonesia) Joko Riyadi	(South Korea) Jung Jae-sung (South Korea) Lee Jae-jin	15–8, 8–15, 6–15	Bronze

=== SEA Games ===
Men's doubles
Year	Venue	Partner	Opponent	Score	Result
2007	Wongchawalitkul University; Nakhon Ratchasima, Thailand	(Indonesia) Joko Riyadi	(Singapore) Hendri Kurniawan Saputra (Singapore) Hendra Wijaya	19–21, 19–21	Bronze

=== World Junior Championships ===
Boys' doubles
Year	Venue	Partner	Opponent	Score	Result
2000	Tianhe Gymnasium; Guangzhou, China	(Indonesia) Markis Kido	(China) Sang Yang (China) Zheng Bo	4–7, 3–7, 0–7	Bronze

Mixed doubles
Year	Venue	Partner	Opponent	Score	Result
2000	Tianhe Gymnasium; Guangzhou, China	(Indonesia) Lita Nurlita	(China) Sang Yang (China) Zhang Yawen	8–7, 3–7, 0–7, 4–7	Bronze

=== Asian Junior Championships ===
Boys' doubles
Year	Venue	Partner	Opponent	Score	Result
2000	Nishiyama Park Gymnasium; Kyoto, Japan	(Indonesia) Bambang Saifulloh	(China) Sang Yang (China) Zheng Bo	15–7, 2–15, 12–15	Bronze

=== BWF Superseries (3 Runners-up) ===
The BWF Superseries, which was launched on 14 December 2006 and implemented in 2007, is a series of elite badminton tournaments, sanctioned by the Badminton World Federation (BWF). BWF Superseries levels are Superseries and Superseries Premier. A season of Superseries consists of twelve tournaments around the world that have been introduced since 2011. Successful players are invited to the Superseries Finals, which are held at the end of each year.

Men's doubles
Year	Tournament	Partner	Opponent	Score	Result
2009	Malaysia Open	(Indonesia) Alvent Yulianto	(South Korea) Jung Jae-sung (South Korea) Lee Yong-dae	21–18, 14–21, 14–21	(silver) Runner-up
2011	Singapore Open	(Indonesia) Alvent Yulianto	(China) Cai Yun (China) Fu Haifeng	17–21, 13–21	(silver) Runner-up

Mixed doubles
Year	Tournament	Partner	Opponent	Score	Result
2009	French Open	(Indonesia) Vita Marissa	(Indonesia) Nova Widianto (Indonesia) Liliyana Natsir	7–21, 7–21	(silver) Runner-up

BWF Super Series Finals tournament
BWF Super Series Premier tournament
BWF Super Series tournament

=== BWF Grand Prix (3 title, 12 runners-up) ===
The BWF Grand Prix had two levels, the BWF Grand Prix and Grand Prix Gold. It was a series of badminton tournaments sanctioned by the Badminton World Federation (BWF) which was held from 2007 to 2017. The World Badminton Grand Prix sanctioned by International Badminton Federation (IBF) from 1983 to 2006.

Men's doubles
Year	Tournament	Partner	Opponent	Score	Result
2004	Chinese Taipei Open	(Indonesia) Joko Riyadi	(Malaysia) Chan Chong Ming (Malaysia) Koo Kien Keat	15–6, 13–15, 6–15	(silver) Runner-up
2006	Philippines Open	(Indonesia) Joko Riyadi	(Hong Kong) Albertus Susanto Njoto (Hong Kong) Yohan Hadikusumo Wiratama	21–18, 12–21, 19–21	(silver) Runner-up
2006	Bitburger Open	(Indonesia) Joko Riyadi	(Poland) Michał Łogosz (Poland) Robert Mateusiak	13–21, 13–21	(silver) Runner-up
2006	Dutch Open	(Indonesia) Joko Riyadi	(Indonesia) Eng Hian (Indonesia) Rian Sukmawan	15–21, 10–21	(silver) Runner-up
2009	Philippines Open	(Indonesia) Alvent Yulianto	(Indonesia) Mohammad Ahsan (Indonesia) Bona Septano	21–10, 14–21, 17–21	(silver) Runner-up
2010	Malaysia Grand Prix Gold	(Indonesia) Alvent Yulianto	(Indonesia) Markis Kido (Indonesia) Hendra Setiawan	21–8, 17–21, 12–21	(silver) Runner-up
2010	Macau Open	(Indonesia) Alvent Yulianto	(South Korea) Ko Sung-hyun (South Korea) Yoo Yeon-seong	17–21, 15–21	(silver) Runner-up
2011	Malaysia Grand Prix Gold	(Indonesia) Alvent Yulianto	(Malaysia) Koo Kien Keat (Malaysia) Tan Boon Heong	16–21, 7–21	(silver) Runner-up
2011	Thailand Open	(Indonesia) Alvent Yulianto	(South Korea) Jung Jae-sung (South Korea) Lee Yong-dae	22–24, 14–21	(silver) Runner-up
2014	Chinese Taipei Open	(Indonesia) Andrei Adistia	(China) Li Junhui (China) Liu Yuchen	21–14, 16–21, 21–16	(gold) Winner
2014	Vietnam Open	(Indonesia) Andrei Adistia	(Japan) Kenta Kazuno (Japan) Kazushi Yamada	15–21, 23–21, 21–17	(gold) Winner

Mixed doubles
Year	Tournament	Partner	Opponent	Score	Result
2009	Macau Open	(Indonesia) Vita Marissa	(China) He Hanbin (China) Yu Yang	14–21, 9–21	(silver) Runner-up
2009	Chinese Taipei Open	(Indonesia) Vita Marissa	(India) Valiyaveetil Diju (India) Jwala Gutta	21–23, 18–21	(silver) Runner-up
2010	Macau Open	(Indonesia) Vita Marissa	(Indonesia) Tontowi Ahmad (Indonesia) Liliyana Natsir	14–21, 18–21	(silver) Runner-up
2010	Chinese Taipei Open	(Indonesia) Vita Marissa	(Indonesia) Tontowi Ahmad (Indonesia) Liliyana Natsir	22–20, 14–21, 22–20	(gold) Winner

BWF Grand Prix Gold tournament
BWF Grand Prix tournament

=== BWF International Challenge/Series ===
Men's doubles
Year	Tournament	Partner	Opponent	Score	Result
2004	Malaysia Satellite	(Indonesia) Joko Riyadi	(Malaysia) Chew Choon Eng (Malaysia) Choong Tan Fook	11–15, 4–15	(silver) Runner-up
2006	Jakarta Satellite	(Indonesia) Joko Riyadi	(Indonesia) Tri Kusharyanto (Indonesia) Bambang Suprianto	21–12, 21–19	(gold) Winner
2006	Thailand Satellite	(Indonesia) Joko Riyadi	(Thailand) Patapol Ngernsrisuk (Thailand) Sudket Prapakamol	21–14, 16–21, 15–21	(silver) Runner-up
2009	Indonesia International	(Indonesia) Alvent Yulianto	(Indonesia) Angga Pratama (Indonesia) Rian Agung Saputra	21–17, 21–12	(gold) Winner
2012	Indonesia International	(Indonesia) Yonathan Suryatama Dasuki	(Indonesia) Ricky Karanda Suwardi (Indonesia) Muhammad Ulinnuha	12–21, 21–12, 16–21	(silver) Runner-up

Mixed doubles
Year	Tournament	Partner	Opponent	Score	Result
2001	Indonesia International	(Indonesia) Lita Nurlita	(Indonesia) Alvent Yulianto (Indonesia) Yunita Tetty	15–11, 17–14	(gold) Winner

BWF International Challenge tournament
BWF International Series tournament

== Performance timeline ==
=== National team ===
- Junior level

Team events	2000
Asian Junior Championships	Silver
World Junior Championships	Bronze

- Senior level

Team events	2007	2008	2009	2010
Southeast Asian Games	Gold	—N/a	A	—N/a
Thomas Cup	—N/a	Bronze	—N/a	Silver
Sudirman Cup	Silver	—N/a	A	—N/a

=== Individual competitions ===
- Junior level

Events	2000
Asian Junior Championships	Bronze
World Junior Championships	Bronze (BD); Bronze (XD)

- Senior level

Events	2001	2002	2003	2004	2005	2006	2007
Southeast Asian Games	A	—N/a	A	—N/a	A	—N/a	Bronze
Asian Championships	Bronze	A		A	Bronze	R1	A

Event	2010	2011	2013	2014	2015
World Championships	R2 (MD); R3 (XD)	R3	R1	A	R2

Tournament	2018	Best
BWF World Tour
Malaysia Masters	R1	F (2010, 2011)
Indonesia Masters	R1	SF (2012, 2015)
Indonesia Masters Super 100	R2	R2 (2018)

Tournament	2007	2008	2009	2010	2011	2012	2013	2014	2015	2016	2017	Best
BWF Superseries
Malaysia Open		R1	F	SF (MD); QF (XD)	QF	R2	R1	A	R2	R1	A	F (2009)
Singapore Open	QF		A	R2 (MD); SF (XD)	F	R1	R2	A	R1	R1	R1	F (2011)
French Open		w/d	F (XD)	R1 (MD); QF (XD)	R1	R2	A	SF	A	A	A	F (2009)
BWF Superseries Finals	—N/a	DNQ	GS (MD); GS (XD)	GS (XD)	DNQ							GS (2009, 2010)

Tournament	2004	2005	2006	2007	2008	2009	2010	2011	2012	2013	2014	2015	2016	2017	Best
BWF Grand Prix and Grand Prix Gold
Philippines Open	—N/a		F		—N/a	F	—N/a								F (2006, 2009)
Malaysia Masters	—N/a					SF (MD); SF (XD)	F (MD); QF (XD)	F	A	R1	SF	R1 (MD); R2 (XD)	R2	SF	F (2010, 2011)
Chinese Taipei Open	F			SF		F (XD)	R1 (MD); W (XD)	SF	A		W	R1	R1	A	W (2010, 2014)
Vietnam Open	—N/a		A							w/d	W	SF	R2	R2	W (2014)
Thailand Open							—N/a	F	A		—N/a	R1	R2	R1	F (2011)
Dutch Open	A		F			A			QF	A					F (2006)
Bitburger Open			F						QF	A	R2	A			F (2006)
Macau Open	—N/a		A			R2 (MD); F (XD)	F (MD); F (XD)		R2	A		QF	R2	A	F (2009, 2010 (MD), 2010 (XD))
Indonesian Masters	—N/a						QF (MD); QF (XD)	QF	SF	R2	R1	SF	QF	—N/a	SF (2012, 2015)

== Personal life ==
When he was young, he joined the SGS Bandung badminton club. His parents' names are Dedi Rustandi (father) and Siti Aminah (mother). His hobbies are football and listening music. Normally people called him Hendra.

== Participation at Indonesian Team ==
- 2 times at Sudirman Cup (2007, 2011)
- 2 times at Thomas Cup (2008, 2010)

== Record against selected opponents ==
Men's doubles results against World Superseries finalists, World Superseries Finals semifinalists, World Championships semifinalists, and Olympic quarterfinalists paired with:

=== Andrei Adistia ===
- (China) Cai Yun & Lu Kai 0–1
- (China) Chai Biao & Hong Wei 0–1
- (Chinese Taipei) Lee Sheng-mu & Tsai Chia-hsin 0–1
- (Denmark) Mads Pieler Kolding & Mads Conrad-Petersen 0–2
- (Denmark) Mathias Boe & Carsten Mogensen 0–2
- (Indonesia) Mohammad Ahsan & Hendra Setiawan 0–1
- (Indonesia) Markis Kido & Marcus Fernaldi Gideon 1–0
- (Malaysia) Mohd Zakry Abdul Latif & Mohd Fairuzizuan Mohd Tazari 1–0

=== Alvent Yulianto ===
- (China) Chai Biao & Guo Zhendong 2–1
- (China) Chai Biao & Zhang Nan 0–3
- (China) Fu Haifeng & Cai Yun 0–3
- (China) Guo Zhendong & Xu Chen 0–1
- (China) Hong Wei & Shen Ye 1–0
- (Chinese Taipei) Fang Chieh-min & Lee Sheng-mu 1–1
- (Denmark) Jens Eriksen & Martin Lundgaard Hansen 0–1
- (Denmark) Mathias Boe & Carsten Mogensen 1–1
- (Germany) Johannes Schöttler & Ingo Kindervater 2–1
- (Indonesia) Angga Pratama & Rian Agung Saputro 1–1
- (Indonesia) Bona Septano & Mohammad Ahsan 1–2
- (Indonesia) Candra Wijaya & Sigit Budiarto 0–1
- (Indonesia) Yonathan Suryatama Dasuki & Rian Sukmawan 1–0
- (Japan) Hirokatsu Hashimoto & Noriyasu Hirata 3–1
- (Japan) Kenichi Hayakawa & Hiroyuki Endo 1–2
- (South Korea) Jung Jae-sung & Lee Yong-dae 0–5
- (South Korea) Kim Gi-jung & Kim Sa-rang 0–1
- (South Korea) Ko Sung-hyun & Yoo Yeon-seong 1–4
- (Malaysia) Chan Chong Ming & Chew Choon Eng 1–1
- (Malaysia) Choong Tan Fook & Lee Wan Wah 1–2
- (Malaysia) Goh V Shem & Lim Khim Wah 1–0
- (Malaysia) Hoon Thien How & Tan Wee Kiong 1–1
- (Malaysia) Koo Kien Keat & Tan Boon Heong 0–2
- (Poland) Robert Mateusiak & Michał Łogosz 1–0
- (United States) Howard Bach & Tony Gunawan 1–0
