= Andre Kurniawan Tedjono =

Indonesian badminton player (born 1986)

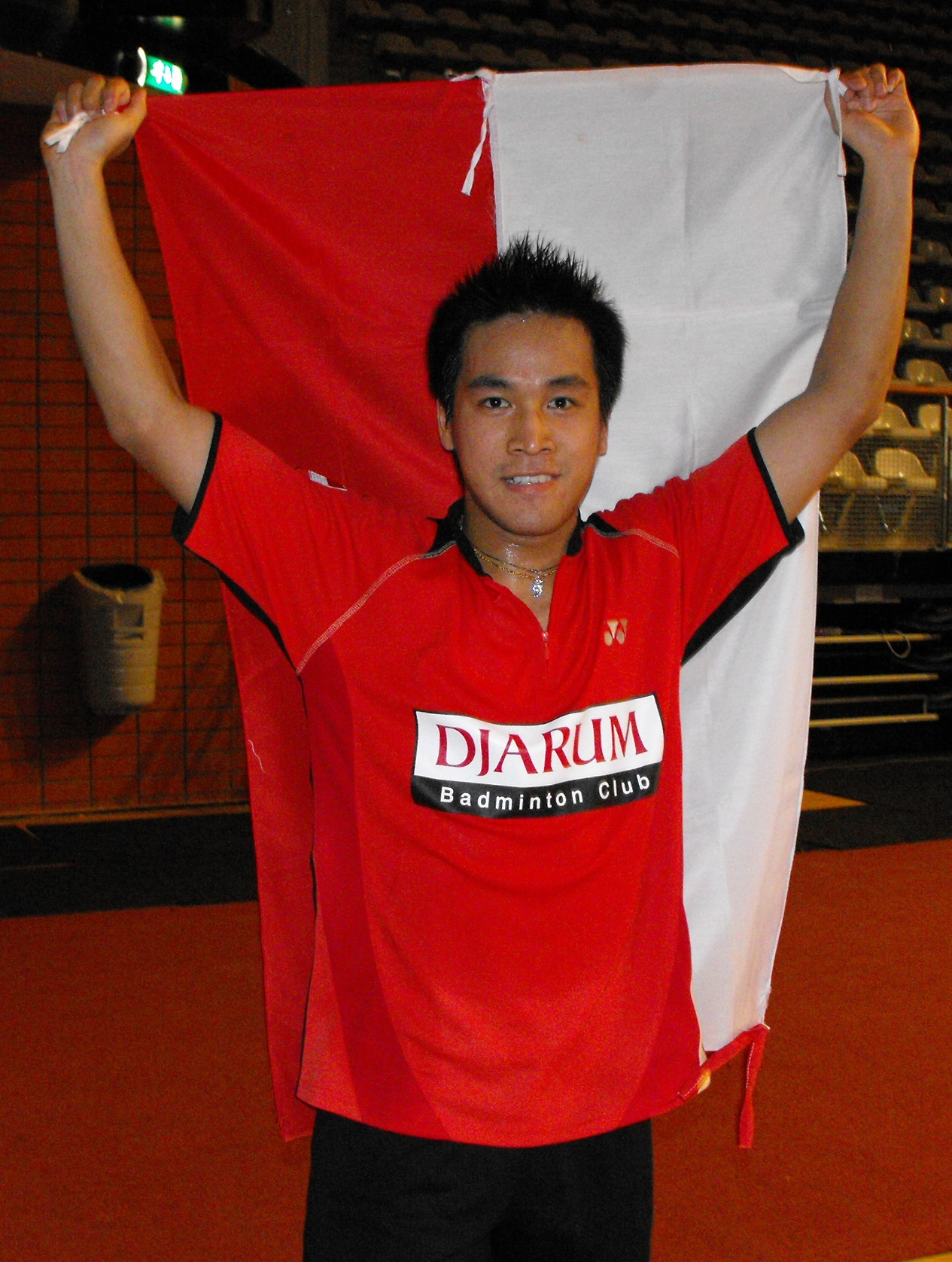

Personal information
- Born: 7 December 1986 (age 39) Magelang, Central Java, Indonesia
- Height: 1.76 m (5 ft 9 in)
- Weight: 69 kg (152 lb)

Sport
- Country: Indonesia
- Sport: Badminton
- Handedness: Right
- Coached by: Agus Dwi Santoso (Djarum)

Men's singles
- Highest ranking: 18 (8 October 2009)
- BWF profile
Medal record
Men's badminton
Representing Indonesia
Asian Junior Championships
| Bronze medal – third place | 2004 Hwacheon | Boys' team |

Andre Kurniawan Tedjono (born 7 December 1986) is an Indonesian badminton player who specializes in singles. Tedjono joined the PB Djarum club in 1998.

== Career ==
While still in his teens Tedjono won the Indonesian (closed) national men's singles title in 2003 and 2005. His best international results thus far are victories in the 2007 New Zealand Open and the 2008 Dutch Open. 2008 Tedjono won the Indonesia International.

== Achievements ==
=== BWF Grand Prix (2 titles, 2 runners-up) ===
The BWF Grand Prix had two levels, the BWF Grand Prix and Grand Prix Gold. It was a series of badminton tournaments sanctioned by the Badminton World Federation (BWF) which was held from 2007 to 2017.

Men's singles
| Year | Tournament | Opponent | Score | Result | Ref. |
|---|---|---|---|---|---|
| 2007 | New Zealand Open | (Malaysia) Wong Choong Hann | 13–21, 21–18, 21–14 | (gold) Winner | |
| 2007 | Vietnam Open | (Malaysia) Roslin Hashim | 12–21, 21–23 | (silver) Runner-up | |
| 2007 | Russian Open | (China) Lü Yi | 19–21, 21–11, 10–21 | (silver) Runner-up | |
| 2008 | Dutch Open | (India) Chetan Anand | 21–15, 11–21, 21–19 | (gold) Winner | |

BWF Grand Prix Gold tournament
BWF Grand Prix tournament

=== BWF International Challenge/Series (9 titles, 6 runners-up) ===
Men's singles
| Year | Tournament | Opponent | Score | Result | Ref. |
|---|---|---|---|---|---|
| 2006 | Brazil International | (Indonesia) Ari Yuli Wahyu Hartanto | 21–13, 19–21, 21–17 | (gold) Winner | |
| 2007 | Banuinvest International | (Japan) Sho Sasaki | 8–21, 12–21 | (silver) Runner-up | |
| 2008 | Le Volant d'Or de Toulouse | (Indonesia) Ari Yuli Wahyu Hartanto | 21–16, 22–20 | (gold) Winner | |
| 2008 | Indonesia International | (Indonesia) Ari Yuli Wahyu Hartanto | 21–13, 21–16 | (gold) Winner | |
| 2010 | Austrian Open | (France) Mathieu Lo Ying Ping | 21–12, 21–11 | (gold) Winner | |
| 2010 | Indonesia International | (Indonesia) Alamsyah Yunus | 18–21, 10–21 | (silver) Runner-up | |
| 2011 | Belgian International | (France) Brice Leverdez | 7–21, 21–13, 11–21 | (silver) Runner-up | |
| 2011 | Swiss International | (Ukraine) Valeriy Atrashchenkov | 21–16, 21–12 | (gold) Winner | |
| 2012 | Belgian International | (Netherlands) Dicky Palyama | 17–21, 21–8, 21–13 | (gold) Winner | |
| 2012 | Dutch International | (India) Anand Pawar | Walkover | (gold) Winner | |
| 2013 | Belgian International | (Netherlands) Eric Pang | 21–17, 21–11 | (gold) Winner | |
| 2013 | Italian International | (Italy) Indra Bagus Ade Chandra | 21–19, 15–21, 12–21 | (silver) Runner-up | |
| 2014 | Austrian Open | (India) Sourabh Varma | 11–21, 23–21, 18–21 | (silver) Runner-up | |
| 2014 | Italian International | (Italy) Indra Bagus Ade Chandra | 15–21, 21–18, 21–18 | (gold) Winner | |
| 2015 | Orleans International | (Ukraine) Dmytro Zavadsky | 22–24, 17–21 | (silver) Runner-up | |

BWF International Challenge tournament
BWF International Series tournament
