= 1999 Asian Junior Badminton Championships – Girls' team =

Badminton championship in Yangon, Myanmar

Girls' team at the 1999 Asian Junior Badminton Championships
- Venue: Thuwunna National Indoor Stadium (1)
- Location: Yangon, Myanmar
- Dates: 11–13 July 1999

The girls' team tournament at the 1999 Asian Junior Badminton Championships took place from 11 to 13 July 1999 at the Thuwunna National Indoor Stadium (1) in Yangon, Myanmar. A total of 9 countries competed in this event.

== Results ==
=== Bracket ===
Round of 16
Singapore	4
Malaysia	1

Quarter-finals
China	5
Sri Lanka	0
Japan	2
Chinese Taipei	3
Indonesia	3
Singapore	2
Thailand	2
South Korea	3

Semi-finals
China	3
Chinese Taipei	2
Indonesia	3
South Korea	2

Final
China	3
Indonesia	0

=== Semi-finals ===
China
3
Thuwunna National Indoor Stadium – 1
12 July 1999

Chinese Taipei
2

			1	2	3
1	(China) (Chinese Taipei)	Hu Ting; Chien Yu-chin	11; 5	11; 9
2	(China) (Chinese Taipei)	Xie Xingfang; Huang Chia-hsin	11; 3	11; 9
3	(China) (Chinese Taipei)	Wei Yan; Chiu Yi-ju	11; 1	11; 5
4	(China) (Chinese Taipei)	Xie Xingfang / Zhang Jiewen; Cheng Wen-hsing / Chien Hsiu-en				w/o
5	(China) (Chinese Taipei)	Wei Yili / Zhang Yawen; Chou Chia-chi / Ku Pei-ting				w/o

South Korea
3
Thuwunna National Indoor Stadium – 1
12 July 1999

Indonesia
2

			1	2	3
1	(South Korea) (Indonesia)	Jun Jae-youn; Atu Rosalina	11; 4	6; 11	7; 11
2	(South Korea) (Indonesia)	Lee Kyung-ok; Mona Santoso	5; 11	11; 7	3; 11
3	(South Korea) (Indonesia)	Si Jin-sun; Siang Chiung	2; 11	11; 7	9; 11
4	(South Korea) (Indonesia)	Hwang Yu-mi / Kim Hee-jung; Enny Erlangga / Dian Novita Sari				w/o
5	(South Korea) (Indonesia)	Joo Hyun-hee / Si Jin-sun; Atu Rosalina / Mona Santoso				w/o

=== Final ===
China
5
Thuwunna National Indoor Stadium – 1
13 July 1999

Indonesia
0

			1	2	3
1	(China) (Indonesia)	Hu Ting; Atu Rosalina	11; 0	13; 10
2	(China) (Indonesia)	Xie Xingfang; Mona Santoso	11; 5	11; 8
3	(China) (Indonesia)	Wei Yan; Siang Chiung	11; 1	11; 3
4	(China) (Indonesia)	Xie Xingfang / Zhang Jiewen; Enny Erlangga / Dian Novita Sari	15; 6	15; 9
5	(China) (Indonesia)	Wei Yili / Zhang Yawen; Chou Chia-chi / Ku Pei-ting	15; 2	15; 5
