= 2009 BWF World Championships – Mixed doubles =

Mixed doubles at the 2009 BWF World Championships
- Venue: Gachibowli Indoor Stadium
- Location: Hyderabad, India
- Dates: August 10, 2009 – August 16, 2009

Medalists
gold medal	Thomas Laybourn; Kamilla Rytter Juhl	Denmark
silver medal	Nova Widianto; Liliyana Natsir	Indonesia
bronze medal	Lee Yong-dae; Lee Hyo-jung	South Korea
bronze medal	Joachim Fischer Nielsen; Christinna Pedersen	Denmark

The 2009 BWF World Championships was the 17th tournament of the World Badminton Championships. It was held at the Gachibowli Indoor Stadium in Hyderabad, Andhra Pradesh, India, from 10 to 16 August 2009. Following the results of the mixed doubles.

== Seeds ==
1. (South Korea) Lee Yong-dae / Lee Hyo-jung (semi-final)
2. (Indonesia) Nova Widianto / Liliyana Natsir (final)
3. (China) Zheng Bo / Ma Jin (quarter-final)
4. (China) He Hanbin / Yu Yang (quarter-final)
5. (China) Xie Zhongbo / Zhang Yawen (quarter-final)
6. (Denmark) Joachim Fischer Nielsen / Christinna Pedersen (semi-final)
7. (Denmark) Thomas Laybourn / Kamilla Rytter Juhl (champion)
8. (India) Valiyaveetil Diju / Jwala Gutta (quarter-final)
9. (Thailand) Sudket Prapakamol / Saralee Thungthongkam (withdrew)
10. (Hong Kong) Yohan Hadikusumo Wiratama / Chau Hoi Wah (third round)
11. (England) Anthony Clark / Donna Kellogg (withdrew)
12. (Poland) Robert Mateusiak / Nadieżda Kostiuczyk (third round)
13. (Thailand) Songphon Anugritayawon / Kunchala Voravichitchaikul (withdrew)
14. (China) Xu Chen / Zhao Yunlei (third round)
15. (South Korea) Yoo Yeon-seong / Kim Min-jung (third round)
16. (Indonesia) Devin Lahardi Fitriawan / Lita Nurlita (third round)

== Main stage ==
=== Section 1 ===
First round
(Bulgaria) S Makarski (Bulgaria) D Dimova	21	8	10
(Hong Kong) Wong WH (Hong Kong) Koon WC	18	21	21
11	(England) A Clark (England) D Kellogg	wo
(Israel) M Zilberman (Israel) S Zilberman
(India) A Vishnu (India) A Balan	14	20
(Japan) N Hirata (Japan) S Matsuo	21	22

Second round
1	(South Korea) Lee Y-d (South Korea) Lee H-j
(Slovenia) A Murn (Slovenia) Š Silvester	wo
14	(China) Xu C (China) Zhao YL	21	21
(Hong Kong) Wong WH (Hong Kong) Koon WC	15	17
5	(China) Xie ZB (China) Zhang YW	17	21	21
(Chinese Taipei) Fang C-m (Chinese Taipei) Cheng W-h	21	11	8
(Israel) M Zilberman (Israel) S Zilberman	11	10
(Japan) N Hirata (Japan) S Matsuo	21	21

Third round
1	(South Korea) Lee Y-d (South Korea) Lee H-j	21	21
14	(China) Xu C (China) Zhao YL	11	17
5	(China) Xie ZB (China) Zhang YW	21	21
(Japan) N Hirata (Japan) S Matsuo	8	14

Quarterfinals
1	(South Korea) Lee Y-d (South Korea) Lee H-j	21	21
5	(China) Xie ZB (China) Zhang YW	16	16

=== Section 2 ===
First round
9	(Thailand) S Prapakamol (Thailand) S Thungthongkam	wo
(Chinese Taipei) Chen H-l (Chinese Taipei) Chou C-c
(France) B Carême (France) L Choinet	21	21
(New Zealand) J Wu (New Zealand) D Barry	9	19
16	(Indonesia) DL Fitriawan (Indonesia) L Nurlita	18	21	21
(Belgium) W Claes (Belgium) N Descamps	21	11	14
(Netherlands) J de Ruiter (Netherlands) I Vaessen	wo
(Russia) I Sozonov (Russia) A Prokopenko

Second round
3	(China) Zheng B (China) Ma J	21	21
(Malaysia) Chan PS (Malaysia) Goh LY	16	12
(Chinese Taipei) Chen H-l (Chinese Taipei) Chou C-c	11	21	21
(France) B Carême (France) L Choinet	21	9	10
7	(Denmark) T Laybourn (Denmark) K Rytter Juhl	21	21
(Wales) R Vaughan (Wales) S Thomas	15	12
16	(Indonesia) DL Fitriawan (Indonesia) L Nurlita	22	21
(Russia) I Sozonov (Russia) A Prokopenko	20	13

Third round
3	(China) Zheng B (China) Ma J	21	21	21
(Chinese Taipei) Chen H-l (Chinese Taipei) Chou Chia-chi	13	23	15
7	(Denmark) T Laybourn (Denmark) K Rytter Juhl	21	21
16	(Indonesia) DL Fitriawan (Indonesia) L Nurlita	9	9

Quarterfinals
3	(China) Zheng B (China) Ma J	20	21	20
7	(Denmark) T Laybourn (Denmark) K Rytter Juhl	22	11	22

=== Section 3 ===
First round
(Germany) J Schöttler (Germany) B Overzier	21	21
(New Zealand) H Tam (New Zealand) D Haliday	15	8
(Switzerland) A Dumartheray (Switzerland) S Jaquet	10	8
10	(Hong Kong) YH Wiratama (Hong Kong) Chau HW	21	21
(Slovenia) I Utroša (Slovenia) M Tvrdy	16	14
(Canada) W Milroy (Canada) F McKee	21	21
(England) C Adcock (England) G White	wo
15	(South Korea) Yoo Y-s (South Korea) Kim M-j

Second round
(Germany) J Schöttler (Germany) B Overzier	19	24
10	(Hong Kong) YH Wiratama (Hong Kong) Chau HW	21	26
(Russia) V Durkin (Russia) N Vislova	wo
6	(Denmark) J Fischer Nielsen (Denmark) C Pedersen
(Canada) W Milroy (Canada) F McKee	13	19
15	(South Korea) Yoo Y-s (South Korea) Kim M-j	21	21
(Malaysia) Ong JG (Malaysia) Chong SC	11	20
4	(China) He HB (China) Yu Y	21	22

Third round
10	(Hong Kong) YH Wiratama (Hong Kong) Chau HW	19	21	15
6	(Denmark) J Fischer Nielsen (Denmark) C Pedersen	21	15	21
15	(South Korea) Yoo Y-s (South Korea) Kim M-j	8	9
4	(China) He HB (China) Yu Y	21	21

Quarterfinals
6	(Denmark) J Fischer Nielsen (Denmark) C Pedersen	21	21
4	(China) He HB (China) Yu Y	10	17

=== Section 4 ===
First round
(Malaysia) MR Abdul Latif (Malaysia) Woon KW	17	21	17
(Ukraine) V Atrashchenkov (Ukraine) E Prus	21	9	21
(Russia) A Nikolaenko (Russia) V Sorokina	11	17
12	(Poland) R Mateusiak (Poland) N Kostiuczyk	21	21
(Chinese Taipei) Hsieh Y-h (Chinese Taipei) Chien Y-c	15	14
(Malaysia) Koo KK (Malaysia) Ng HL	21	21
(Netherlands) R Bosch (Netherlands) P van Dooremalen
13	(Thailand) S Anugritayawon (Thailand) K Voravichitchaikul	wo

Second round
(Ukraine) V Atrashchenkov (Ukraine) E Prus	13	9
12	(Poland) R Mateusiak (Poland) N Kostiuczyk	21	21
(England) N Robertson (England) J Wallwork	wo
8	(India) V Diju (India) J Gutta
(Malaysia) Koo KK (Malaysia) Ng HL	21	21
(Netherlands) R Bosch (Netherlands) P van Dooremalen	19	14
(Belarus) A Konakh (Belarus) A Zaitsava	12	9
2	(Indonesia) N Widianto (Indonesia) L Natsir	21	21

Third round
12	(Poland) R Mateusiak (Poland) N Kostiuczyk	11	20
8	(India) V Diju (India) J Gutta	21	22
(Malaysia) Koo KK (Malaysia) Ng HL	15	19
2	(Indonesia) N Widianto (Indonesia) L Natsir	21	21

Quarterfinals
8	(India) V Diju (India) J Gutta	16	14
2	(Indonesia) N Widianto (Indonesia) L Natsir	21	21

== Final stage ==
Quarter-finals
1	(South Korea) Lee Yong-dae (South Korea) Lee Hyo-jung	21	21
5	(China) Xie Zhongbo (China) Zhang Yawen	16	16
3	(China) Zheng Bo (China) Ma Jin	20	21	20
7	(Denmark) Thomas Laybourn (Denmark) Kamilla Rytter Juhl	22	11	22
6	(Denmark) Joachim Fischer Nielsen (Denmark) Christinna Pedersen	21	21
4	(China) He Hanbin (China) Yu Yang	10	17
8	(India) Valiyaveetil Diju (India) Jwala Gutta	16	14
2	(Indonesia) Nova Widianto (Indonesia) Liliyana Natsir	21	21

Semi-finals
1	(South Korea) Lee Yong-dae (South Korea) Lee Hyo-jung	21	9	18
7	(Denmark) Thomas Laybourn (Denmark) Kamilla Rytter Juhl	18	21	21
6	(Denmark) Joachim Fischer Nielsen (Denmark) Christinna Pedersen	18	21	18
2	(Indonesia) Nova Widianto (Indonesia) Liliyana Natsir	21	14	21

Final
7	(Denmark) Thomas Laybourn (Denmark) Kamilla Rytter Juhl	21	21
2	(Indonesia) Nova Widianto (Indonesia) Liliyana Natsir	13	17
