= Daniel Shirley =

New Zealand badminton player (born 1979)

Daniel A. Shirley
Personal information
- Born: 13 April 1979 (age 47) Waitakere City, New Zealand
- Height: 1.82 m (6 ft 0 in)

Sport
- Country: New Zealand
- Sport: Badminton
- Handedness: Left
- Event: Doubles

Doubles
- BWF profile
Medal record
Men's badminton
Representing New Zealand
World Championships
Bronze medal – third place	2005 Anaheim	Mixed Doubles
Commonwealth Games
Silver medal – second place	2006 Melbourne	Mixed doubles
Bronze medal – third place	1998 Kuala Lumpur	Men's team
Bronze medal – third place	2002 Manchester	Mixed doubles
Bronze medal – third place	2002 Manchester	Mixed team

Daniel A. Shirley (born 13 April 1979) is a male badminton player from New Zealand.

== Career ==
Shirley competed in badminton at the 2004 Summer Olympics in mixed doubles with partner Sara Petersen. They defeated Philippe Bourret and Denyse Julien of Canada in the first round but lost to Jonas Rasmussen and Rikke Olsen of Denmark in the round of 16.

They also won a bronze medal at the 2002 Commonwealth Games, and the 2005 IBF World Championships, along with a silver metal at the 2006 Commonwealth Games.

== Achievements ==
=== World Championships ===
Mixed doubles
Year	Venue	Partner	Opponent	Score	Result
2005	Arrowhead Pond; Anaheim, United States	(New Zealand) Sara Runesten-Petersen	(China) Xie Zhongbo (China) Zhang Yawen	8–15, 8–15	Bronze

=== Commonwealth Games ===
Mixed doubles
Year	Venue	Partner	Opponent	Score	Result
2002	Bolton Arena; Manchester, England	(New Zealand) Sara Runesten-Petersen	(England) Simon Archer (England) Joanne Goode	1–7, 7–5, 6–8, 7–4, 2–7	Bronze
2006	Melbourne Convention and Exhibition Centre; Melbourne, Australia	(New Zealand) Sara Runesten-Petersen	(England) Nathan Robertson (England) Gail Emms	17–21, 10–21	Silver

=== Oceania Championships ===
Men's doubles
Year	Venue	Partner	Opponent	Score	Result
2002	Suva, Fiji	(New Zealand) John Gordon	(Australia) Peter Blackburn (Australia) Murray Hocking	7–4, 5–7, 6–8	Bronze
2004	Waitakere City, New Zealand	(New Zealand) John Gordon	(New Zealand) Geoffrey Bellingham (New Zealand) Craig Cooper	15–11, 17–15	Gold
2006	Auckland, New Zealand	(New Zealand) John Gordon	(New Zealand) Geoffrey Bellingham (New Zealand) Craig Cooper	21–19, 15–13 Retired	Silver

Mixed doubles
Year	Venue	Partner	Opponent	Score	Result
2002	Suva, Fiji	(New Zealand) Sara Runesten-Petersen	(Australia) Travis Denney (Australia) Kate Wilson-Smith		Gold
2004	Waitakere City, New Zealand	(New Zealand) Sara Runesten-Petersen	(Australia) Travis Denney (Australia) Kate Wilson-Smith		Gold
2006	Auckland, New Zealand	(New Zealand) Sara Runesten-Petersen	(Australia) Travis Denney (Australia) Kate Wilson-Smith		Gold

=== IBF World Grand Prix ===
Men's doubles
Year	Tournament	Partner	Opponent	Score	Result
2005	New Zealand Open	(New Zealand) John Gordon	(Australia) Boyd Cooper (Australia) Travis Denney	11–15, 9–15	(silver) Runner-up

Mixed doubles
Year	Tournament	Partner	Opponent	Score	Result
2005	New Zealand Open	(New Zealand) Sara Runesten-Petersen	(Australia) Travis Denney (Australia) Kate Wilson-Smith	15–8, 15–4	(gold) Winner
2005	Bitburger Open	(New Zealand) Sara Runesten-Petersen	(Ukraine) Vladislav Druzchenko (Sweden) Johanna Persson	11–15, 15–11, 6–15	(silver) Runner-up

=== IBF International Challenge/Series ===
Men's doubles
Year	Tournament	Partner	Opponent	Score	Result
1999	Fiji International	(New Zealand) Geoffrey Bellingham	(Australia) Peter Blackburn (Mauritius) Denis Constantin	13–15, 12–15	(silver) Runner-up
2000	New Zealand International	(New Zealand) John Gordon	(Scotland) Robert Blair (Scotland) Russell Hogg	17–16, 15–7	(gold) Winner
2001	Canberra International	(New Zealand) John Gordon	(Australia) Peter Blackburn (Australia) Murray Hocking	8–6, 7–5, 7–3	(gold) Winner
2002	Dutch International	(New Zealand) John Gordon	(England) Peter Jeffrey (England) Ian Palethorpe		(gold) Winner
2002	Western Australia International	(New Zealand) John Gordon	(Japan) Shuichi Nakao (Japan) Shuichi Sakamoto	7–4, 7–4, 7–4	(gold) Winner
2003	Wellington International	(New Zealand) John Gordon	(Japan) Yuichi Ikeda (Japan) Shoji Sato	15–5, 16–17, 15–10	(gold) Winner
2006	Australian International	(New Zealand) John Gordon	(Indonesia) Aji Basuki Sindoro (Australia) Ashley Brehaut	21–19, 13–21, 21–18	(gold) Winner
2007	Australian International	(New Zealand) John Gordon	(Australia) Aji Basuki Sindoro (Australia) Ashley Brehaut	19–21, 19–21	(silver) Runner-up
2011	Counties Manukau International	(England) Andrew Smith	(Australia) Wesley Caulkett (Australia) Raymond Tam		(gold) Winner

Mixed doubles
Year	Tournament	Partner	Opponent	Score	Result
2000	Auckland International	(New Zealand) Tammy Jenkins	(New Zealand) Geoffrey Bellingham (New Zealand) Rhona Robertson		(gold) Winner
2002	New Zealand International	(New Zealand) Sara Runesten-Petersen	(New Zealand) Chris Blair (New Zealand) Tammy Jenkins		(gold) Winner
2003	Waikato International	(New Zealand) Sara Runesten-Petersen	(Japan) Tadashi Ohtsuka (Japan) Shizuka Yamamoto		(gold) Winner
2003	Western Australia International	(New Zealand) Sara Runesten-Petersen	(Japan) Norio Imai (Japan) Chikako Nakayama		(gold) Winner
2004	Auckland International	(New Zealand) Sara Runesten-Petersen	(Malaysia) Ong Ewe Hock (Malaysia) Sutheaswari Mudukasan		(gold) Winner
2004	Malaysia International	(New Zealand) Sara Runesten-Petersen	(England) Kristian Roebuck (England) Liza Parker		(gold) Winner
2005	Waikato International	(New Zealand) Sara Runesten-Petersen	(New Zealand) Craig Cooper (New Zealand) Lianne Shirley		(gold) Winner
2006	North Harbour International	(New Zealand) Gabby Shirley	(Philippines) Kennevic Asuncion (Philippines) Kennie Asuncion	21–17, 17–21, 13–21	(silver) Runner-up
2006	Australian International	(Malaysia) Joanne Quay	(Australia) Craig Cooper (Australia) Renee Flavell	21–10, 21–19	(gold) Winner
2011	Counties Manukau International	(New Zealand) Gabby Aves	(New Zealand) Oliver Leydon-Davis (New Zealand) Susannah Leydon-Davis	21–11, 21–17	(gold) Winner
