= 2006 Indonesia Open (badminton) =

Tournament details
- Dates: 31 May 2006 – 4 June 2006
- Edition: 25th
- Level: World Grand Prix 6 Stars
- Total prize money: US$250,000
- Venue: GOR Kertajaya Surabaya and GOR Sudirman
- Location: Surabaya, Indonesia

Champions
- Men's singles: (Indonesia) Taufik Hidayat
- Women's singles: (China) Zhu Lin
- Men's doubles: (United States) Tony Gunawan (Indonesia) Candra Wijaya
- Women's doubles: (China) Wei Yili (China) Zhang Yawen
- Mixed doubles: (China) Xie Zhongbo (China) Zhang Yawen

The 2006 Indonesia Open (officially known as the Djarum Indonesia Open 2006 for sponsorship reasons) in badminton was held in Jakarta, from May 31 to June 4, 2006. It was a six-star tournament and the prize money was US$250,000.

== Final results ==
Category	Winners	Runners-up	Score
Men's singles	(Indonesia) Taufik Hidayat	(China) Bao Chunlai	21–18, 21–17
Women's singles	(China) Zhu Lin	(China) Lu Lan	21–11, 21–16
Men's doubles	(United States) Tony Gunawan & (Indonesia) Candra Wijaya	(Indonesia) Markis Kido & Hendra Setiawan	21–11, 21–16
Women's doubles	(China) Wei Yili & Zhang Yawen	(China) Yang Wei & Zhang Jiewen	21–13, 21–13
Mixed doubles	(China) Xie Zhongbo & Zhang Yawen	(Indonesia) Nova Widianto & Liliyana Natsir	21–19, 21–15

== Results ==
=== Men's singles ===
Quarterfinals
9/16	(China) Chen Yu	21	19	21
9/16	(Netherlands) Eric Pang	11	21	15
3/4	(Denmark) Kenneth Jonassen	19	19
5/8	(Indonesia) Taufik Hidayat	21	21
9/16	(Indonesia) Simon Santoso	11	21	20
3/4	(China) Bao Chunlai	21	13	22
(China) Qiu Yanbo	wo	wo
2	(South Korea) Lee Hyun-il

Semifinals
(China) Chen Yu	21	17	16
(Indonesia) Taufik Hidayat	19	21	21
(China) Bao Chunlai	21	21
(China) Qiu Yanbo	16	13

Finals
(Indonesia) Taufik Hidayat	21	21
(China) Bao Chunlai	18	19
