= Badminton at the 2006 Asian Games – Mixed doubles =

Mixed doubles at the 2006 Asian Games
- Venue: Aspire Hall 3
- Dates: 6–8 December
- Competitors: 38 from 11 nations

Medalists
gold medal	Zheng Bo; Gao Ling	China
silver medal	Xie Zhongbo; Zhang Yawen	China
bronze medal	Mohd Fairuzizuan Tazari; Wong Pei Tty	Malaysia
bronze medal	Sudket Prapakamol; Saralee Thungthongkam	Thailand

The badminton mixed doubles tournament at the 2006 Asian Games in Doha took place from 6 December to 8 December at Aspire Hall 3.

== Schedule ==
All times are Arabia Standard Time (UTC+03:00)

Date	Time	Event
Wednesday, 6 December 2006	13:30	Round of 32
Wednesday, 6 December 2006	17:00	Round of 16
Thursday, 7 December 2006	16:00	Quarterfinals
Friday, 8 December 2006	18:00	Semifinals
Friday, 8 December 2006	21:00	Final

== Results ==
=== Final ===
Final
	Zheng Bo (CHN); Gao Ling (CHN)	21	25
3	Xie Zhongbo (CHN); Zhang Yawen (CHN)	16	23

=== Top half ===
Round of 32
Tadashi Otsuka (JPN); Satoko Suetsuna (JPN)	20	22	22
Mohd Fairuzizuan Tazari (MAS); Wong Pei Tty (MAS)	22	20	24

Round of 16
1	Nova Widianto (INA); Liliyana Natsir (INA)	21	21
Wong Wai Hong (HKG); Assunta Ng (HKG)	6	14
7	Songphon Anugritayawon (THA); Kunchala Voravichitchaikul (THA)	16	13
Zheng Bo (CHN); Gao Ling (CHN)	21	21
4	Lee Jae-jin (KOR); Lee Hyo-jung (KOR)	21	23
Tsai Chia-hsin (TPE); Cheng Wen-hsing (TPE)	16	21
6	Hendri Saputra (SIN); Li Yujia (SIN)	19	13
Mohd Fairuzizuan Tazari (MAS); Wong Pei Tty (MAS)	21	21

Quarterfinals
1	Nova Widianto (INA); Liliyana Natsir (INA)	19	10
Zheng Bo (CHN); Gao Ling (CHN)	21	21
4	Lee Jae-jin (KOR); Lee Hyo-jung (KOR)	20	21	13
Mohd Fairuzizuan Tazari (MAS); Wong Pei Tty (MAS)	22	11	21

Semifinals
Zheng Bo (CHN); Gao Ling (CHN)	21	21
Mohd Fairuzizuan Tazari (MAS); Wong Pei Tty (MAS)	11	13

=== Bottom half ===
Round of 32
Koo Kien Keat (MAS); Joanne Quay (MAS)	21	21
Kennevic Asuncion (PHI); Kennie Asuncion (PHI)	13	15
Alvent Yulianto (INA); Vita Marissa (INA)	21	21
Keita Masuda (JPN); Kanako Yonekura (JPN)	12	15

Round of 16
Koo Kien Keat (MAS); Joanne Quay (MAS)	21	21
8	Hendra Wijaya (SIN); Frances Liu (SIN)	9	16
Hui Wai Ho (HKG); Olivia Wong (HKG)	11	16
3	Xie Zhongbo (CHN); Zhang Yawen (CHN)	21	21
Alvent Yulianto (INA); Vita Marissa (INA)	15	17
5	Lee Yong-dae (KOR); Hwang Yu-mi (KOR)	21	21
Tarek Shalhoum (SYR); Roula Matar (SYR)	11	8
2	Sudket Prapakamol (THA); Saralee Thungthongkam (THA)	21	21

Quarterfinals
Koo Kien Keat (MAS); Joanne Quay (MAS)	9	5
3	Xie Zhongbo (CHN); Zhang Yawen (CHN)	21	21
5	Lee Yong-dae (KOR); Hwang Yu-mi (KOR)	20	18
2	Sudket Prapakamol (THA); Saralee Thungthongkam (THA)	22	21

Semifinals
3	Xie Zhongbo (CHN); Zhang Yawen (CHN)	21	21
2	Sudket Prapakamol (THA); Saralee Thungthongkam (THA)	11	19
