= 2005 IBF World Championships – Mixed doubles =

Mixed doubles at the 2005 IBF World Championships
- Venue: Arrowhead Pond
- Location: Anaheim, United States
- Dates: August 15, 2005 – August 21, 2005

Medalists
| gold medal | Nova Widianto; Liliyana Natsir | Indonesia |
| silver medal | Xie Zhongbo; Zhang Yawen | China |
| bronze medal | Daniel Shirley; Sara Runesten-Petersen | New Zealand |
| bronze medal | Sudket Prapakamol; Saralee Thungthongkam | Thailand |

The 2005 IBF World Championships (World Badminton Championships) took place in Arrowhead Pond in Anaheim, United States, between August 15 and August 21, 2005. Following the results in the mixed doubles.

== Seeds ==
1. (England) Nathan Robertson / Gail Emms, Second round
2. (China) Zhang Jun / Gao Ling, Quarter-final
3. (China) Chen Qiqiu / Zhao Tingting, Quarter-final
4. (Indonesia) Nova Widianto / Liliyana Natsir, Champions
5. (Denmark) Jens Eriksen / Mette Schjoldager, Third round
6. (South Korea) Lee Jae-jin / Lee Hyo-jung, Quarter-final
7. (Thailand) Sudket Prapakamol / Saralee Thungthongkam, Semi-final
8. (England) Robert Blair / Natalie Munt, Third round
9. (Denmark) Thomas Laybourn / Kamilla Rytter Juhl, Third round
10. (Malaysia) Koo Kien Keat / Wong Pei Tty, Third round
11. (China) Xie Zhongbo / Zhang Yawen, Runners-up
12. (Singapore) Hendri Saputra / Li Yujia, Third round
13. (England) Anthony Clark / Donna Kellogg, Third round
14. (Sweden) Fredrik Bergström / Johanna Persson, Quarter-final
15. (New Zealand) Daniel Shirley / Sara Runesten-Petersen, Semi-final
16. (Canada) Philippe Bourret / Helen Nichol, First round

== Main stage ==
=== Section 1 ===
Round 1
(Indonesia) Nova Widianto (Indonesia) Liliyana Natsir
bye
(Slovenia) Marko Kroflič (Slovenia) Mateja Fink
bye
(Denmark) Thomas Laybourn (Denmark) Kamilla Rytter Juhl | 15 | 15
(Hong Kong) Liu Kwok Wa (Hong Kong) Koon Wai Chee | 11 | 10
(Belgium) Wouter Claes (Belgium) Nathalie Descamps | 15 | 15
(France) Thomas Quéré (France) Élodie Eymard | 7 | 8
(Sweden) Fredrik Bergström (Sweden) Johanna Persson | 4 | 15 | 15
(South Korea) Lee Yong-dae (South Korea) Ha Jung-eun | 15 | 8 | 6
(Chinese Taipei) Hu Chung-shyan (Chinese Taipei) Chien Yu-chin | 15 | 15
(Peru) Juan José Espinosa (Peru) Cristina Aicardi | 3 | 4
(England) Robert Blair (England) Natalie Munt
bye
(United States) Khan Malaythong (United States) Mesinee Mangkalakiri | 15 | 15
(New Zealand) Craig Cooper (New Zealand) Lianne Shirley | 6 | 8

Round 2
(Indonesia) Nova Widianto (Indonesia) Liliyana Natsir | 15 | 15
(Slovenia) Marko Kroflič (Slovenia) Mateja Fink | 1 | 0
(Denmark) Thomas Laybourn (Denmark) Kamilla Rytter Juhl | 15 | 15
(Belgium) Wouter Claes (Belgium) Nathalie Descamps | 10 | 4
(Sweden) Fredrik Bergström (Sweden) Johanna Persson | 13 | 15 | 15
(Chinese Taipei) Hu Chung-shyan (Chinese Taipei) Chien Yu-chin | 15 | 11 | 3
(England) Robert Blair (England) Natalie Munt | 15 | 15
(United States) Khan Malaythong (United States) Mesinee Mangkalakiri | 6 | 3

Round 3
(Indonesia) Nova Widianto (Indonesia) Liliyana Natsir | 15 | 15
(Denmark) Thomas Laybourn (Denmark) Kamilla Rytter Juhl | 12 | 12
(Sweden) Fredrik Bergström (Sweden) Johanna Persson | w.o.
(England) Robert Blair (England) Natalie Munt

Quarterfinals
(Indonesia) Nova Widianto (Indonesia) Liliyana Natsir | 15 | 15
(Sweden) Fredrik Bergström (Sweden) Johanna Persson | 6 | 6

=== Section 2 ===
Round 1
(Thailand) Sudket Prapakamol (Thailand) Saralee Thungthongkam
bye
(Czech Republic) Jiří Provazník (Czech Republic) Markéta Koudelková | w.o.
(Spain) Carlos Longo (Spain) Laura Molina
(Singapore) Hendri Saputra (Singapore) Li Yujia | 15 | 15
(Denmark) Peter Steffensen (Denmark) Lena Frier Kristiansen | 11 | 10
(Poland) Robert Mateusiak (Poland) Nadieżda Kostiuczyk | 15 | 15
(United States) Howard Bach (United States) Cindy Shi | 13 | 6
(China) Zhang Jun (China) Gao Ling
bye
(Canada) Mike Beres (Canada) Jody Patrick
bye
(Malaysia) Koo Kien Keat (Malaysia) Wong Pei Tty | 15 | 15
(England) Kristian Roebuck (England) Liza Parker | 4 | 5
(Japan) Hiroshi Shimizu (Japan) Miyuki Tai | 15 | 15
(Canada) William Milroy (Canada) Tammy Sun | 3 | 8

Round 2
(Thailand) Sudket Prapakamol (Thailand) Saralee Thungthongkam | 15 | 15
(Czech Republic) Jiří Provazník (Czech Republic) Markéta Koudelková | 4 | 2
(Singapore) Hendri Saputra (Singapore) Li Yujia | 14 | 15 | 15
(Poland) Robert Mateusiak (Poland) Nadieżda Kostiuczyk | 17 | 11 | 4
(China) Zhang Jun (China) Gao Ling | 15 | 15
(Canada) Mike Beres (Canada) Jody Patrick | 2 | 2
(Malaysia) Koo Kien Keat (Malaysia) Wong Pei Tty | 15 | 15
(Japan) Hiroshi Shimizu (Japan) Miyuki Tai | 1 | 2

Round 3
(Thailand) Sudket Prapakamol (Thailand) Saralee Thungthongkam | 17 | 15
(Singapore) Hendri Saputra (Singapore) Li Yujia | 14 | 7
(China) Zhang Jun (China) Gao Ling | 15 | 15
(Malaysia) Koo Kien Keat (Malaysia) Wong Pei Tty | 11 | 6

Quarterfinals
(Thailand) Sudket Prapakamol (Thailand) Saralee Thungthongkam | 10 | 15 | 15
(China) Zhang Jun (China) Gao Ling | 15 | 7 | 11

=== Section 3 ===
Round 1
(China) Xie Zhongbo (China) Zhang Yawen | 15 | 15
(Malaysia) Mohd Fairuzizi Mohd Tazari (Malaysia) Ooi Sock Ai | 1 | 0
(Japan) Shintaro Ikeda (Japan) Satoko Suetsuna | w.o.
(Spain) José Antonio Crespo (Spain) Yoana Martinez
(Denmark) Jens Eriksen (Denmark) Mette Schjoldager
bye
(Scotland) Andrew Bowman (Scotland) Kirsteen McEwan-Miller | 15 | 15
(Republic of Ireland) Brian Smyth (Republic of Ireland) Caitriona Farrell | 3 | 2
(China) Chen Qiqiu (China) Zhao Tingting
bye
(Singapore) Hendra Wijaya (Singapore) Liu Fan Frances
bye
(Philippines) Kennevic Asuncion (Philippines) Kennie Asuncion | 15 | 9 | 15
(Canada) Philippe Bourret (Canada) Helen Nichol | 13 | 15 | 9
(Netherlands) Jürgen Wouters (Netherlands) Paulien van Dooremalen | 17 | 15
(Slovenia) Gasper Plestenjak (Slovenia) Maja Kersnik | 16 | 7

Round 2
(China) Xie Zhongbo (China) Zhang Yawen | 15 | 15
(Japan) Shintaro Ikeda (Japan) Satoko Suetsuna | 6 | 5
(Denmark) Jens Eriksen (Denmark) Mette Schjoldager | 15 | 15
(Scotland) Andrew Bowman (Scotland) Kirsteen McEwan-Miller | 2 | 2
(China) Chen Qiqiu (China) Zhao Tingting | 15 | 15
(Singapore) Hendra Wijaya (Singapore) Liu Fan Frances | 6 | 5
(Philippines) Kennevic Asuncion (Philippines) Kennie Asuncion | 15 | 15
(Netherlands) Jürgen Wouters (Netherlands) Paulien van Dooremalen | 13 | 9

Round 3
(China) Xie Zhongbo (China) Zhang Yawen | 7 | 15 | 15
(Denmark) Jens Eriksen (Denmark) Mette Schjoldager | 15 | 10 | 7
(China) Chen Qiqiu (China) Zhao Tingting | 15 | 15
(Philippines) Kennevic Asuncion (Philippines) Kennie Asuncion | 7 | 5

Quarterfinals
(China) Xie Zhongbo (China) Zhang Yawen | 6 | 17 | 15
(China) Chen Qiqiu (China) Zhao Tingting | 15 | 14 | 2

=== Section 4 ===
Round 1
(New Zealand) Daniel Shirley (New Zealand) Sara Runesten-Petersen | 16 | 15 | 15
(Germany) Ingo Kindervater (Germany) Kathrin Piotrowski | 17 | 9 | 8
(Ukraine) Vladislav Druzchenko (Ukraine) Elena Nozdran | 15 | 12 | 15
(France) Jean-Michel Lefort (France) Weny Rahmawati | 10 | 15 | 7
(Thailand) Songphon Anugritayawon (Thailand) Kunchala Voravichitchaikul
bye
(England) Nathan Robertson (England) Gail Emms
bye
(South Korea) Lee Jae-jin (South Korea) Lee Hyo-jung
bye
(Chinese Taipei) Tsai Chia-hsin (Chinese Taipei) Cheng Wen-hsing | 15 | 15
(United States) Marc Lai (United States) Melinda Keszthelyi | 4 | 1
(England) Anthony Clark (England) Donna Kellogg | 15 | 15
(Nigeria) Orobosa Okuonghae (Nigeria) Grace Daniel | 1 | 1
(Hong Kong) Albertus Susanto Njoto (Hong Kong) Li Wing Mui | 17 | 15
(Poland) Michał Łogosz (Poland) Kamila Augustyn | 15 | 6

Round 2
(New Zealand) Daniel Shirley (New Zealand) Sara Runesten-Petersen | 15 | 15
(Ukraine) Vladislav Druzchenko (Ukraine) Elena Nozdran | 1 | 2
(Thailand) Songphon Anugritayawon (Thailand) Kunchala Voravichitchaikul | w.o.
(England) Nathan Robertson (England) Gail Emms
(South Korea) Lee Jae-jin (South Korea) Lee Hyo-jung | 15 | 15
(Chinese Taipei) Tsai Chia-hsin (Chinese Taipei) Cheng Wen-hsing | 7 | 7
(England) Anthony Clark (England) Donna Kellogg | 15 | 10 | 15
(Hong Kong) Albertus Susanto Njoto (Hong Kong) Li Wing Mui | 4 | 15 | 3

Round 3
(New Zealand) Daniel Shirley (New Zealand) Sara Runesten-Petersen | 15 | 15
(Thailand) Songphon Anugritayawon (Thailand) Kunchala Voravichitchaikul | 4 | 8
(South Korea) Lee Jae-jin (South Korea) Lee Hyo-jung | 15 | 15
(England) Anthony Clark (England) Donna Kellogg | 8 | 10

Quarterfinals
(New Zealand) Daniel Shirley (New Zealand) Sara Runesten-Petersen | 15 | 15
(South Korea) Lee Jae-jin (South Korea) Lee Hyo-jung | 11 | 13

== Final stage ==
Quarterfinals
(Indonesia) Nova Widianto (Indonesia) Liliyana Natsir | 15 | 15
(Sweden) Fredrik Bergström (Sweden) Johanna Persson | 6 | 6
(Thailand) Sudket Prapakamol (Thailand) Saralee Thungthongkam | 10 | 15 | 15
(China) Zhang Jun (China) Gao Ling | 15 | 7 | 11
(China) Xie Zhongbo (China) Zhang Yawen | 6 | 17 | 15
(China) Chen Qiqiu (China) Zhao Tingting | 15 | 14 | 2
(New Zealand) Daniel Shirley (New Zealand) Sara Runesten-Petersen | 15 | 15
(South Korea) Lee Jae-jin (South Korea) Lee Hyo-jung | 11 | 13

Semifinals
(Indonesia) Nova Widianto (Indonesia) Liliyana Natsir | 15 | 3 | 15
(Thailand) Sudket Prapakamol (Thailand) Saralee Thungthongkam | 9 | 15 | 10
(China) Xie Zhongbo (China) Zhang Yawen | 15 | 15
(New Zealand) Daniel Shirley (New Zealand) Sara Runesten-Petersen | 8 | 8

Finals
(Indonesia) Nova Widianto (Indonesia) Liliyana Natsir | 13 | 15 | 15
(China) Xie Zhongbo (China) Zhang Yawen | 15 | 8 | 2
