= Sang Yang =

Chinese badminton player

Sang Yang 桑洋
Personal information
- Born: 17 July 1982 (age 44) Zhejiang, China
- Height: 1.79 m (5 ft 10 in)
- Weight: 78 kg (172 lb)

Sport
- Country: China
- Sport: Badminton
- Handedness: Right
- Retired: 22 March 2007
- Event: Men's & mixed doubles

Men's & mixed doubles
- BWF profile
Medal record
Men's badminton
Representing China
World Championships
Bronze medal – third place	2003 Birmingham	Men's doubles
Thomas Cup
Gold medal – first place	2004 Jakarta	Men's team
World Junior Championships
Gold medal – first place	2000 Guangzhou	Boys' doubles
Gold medal – first place	2000 Guangzhou	Mixed doubles
Gold medal – first place	2000 Guangzhou	Mixed team
Asian Junior Championships
Gold medal – first place	1998 Kuala Lumpur	Boys' team
Gold medal – first place	1999 Yangon	Boys' doubles
Gold medal – first place	2000 Kyoto	Boys' doubles
Gold medal – first place	2000 Kyoto	Boys' team
Silver medal – second place	1999 Yangon	Boys' singles
Silver medal – second place	1999 Yangon	Boys' team
Silver medal – second place	2000 Kyoto	Mixed doubles

Sang Yang (Chinese: 桑洋; pinyin: Sāng Yáng; born: 17 July 1982) is a retired Chinese badminton player and former Olympian from Zhejiang.

== Career ==
Sang started representing China in the junior tournament, and at the 1998 and 2000 Asian Junior Championships, he helped the boys' team clinch the gold medal. He won the individual medals captured the boys' doubles gold and boys' singles silver in 1999, and also boys' doubles gold and mixed doubles silver in 2000. At the 2000 World Junior Championships, he won three gold medals in the boys' doubles, mixed doubles and team event.

Sang won the 2003 Indonesia Open in the men's doubles with partner Zheng Bo. In 2004 they defeated Denmark's Jens Eriksen and Martin Lundgaard in the Thomas Cup final to clinch the deciding third point for the Chinese team.

Sang competed for China in badminton at the 2004 Summer Olympics also in men's doubles with Zheng Bo. They had a bye in the first round and defeated Chan Chong Ming and Chew Choon Eng of Malaysia in the second. In the quarterfinals, Sang and Zheng lost 7–15, 11–15 to Korea's Kim Dong-moon and Ha Tae-kwon who went on to win the gold medal.

Sang retired on 22 March 2007, because of an injury.

== Achievements ==
=== World Championships ===
Men's doubles
Year	Venue	Partner	Opponent	Score	Result
2003	National Indoor Arena, Birmingham, England	(China) Zheng Bo	(Denmark) Lars Paaske (Denmark) Jonas Rasmussen	6–15, 8–15	Bronze

=== World Junior Championships ===
Boys' doubles
Year	Venue	Partner	Opponent	Score	Result
2000	Tianhe Gymnasium, Guangzhou, China	(China) Zheng Bo	(China) Cao Chen (China) Xie Zhongbo	7–5, 7–5, 2–7, 7–5	Gold

Mixed doubles
Year	Venue	Partner	Opponent	Score	Result
2000	Tianhe Gymnasium, Guangzhou, China	(China) Zhang Yawen	(China) Zheng Bo (China) Wei Yili	7–3, 7–0, 8–6	Gold

=== Asian Junior Championships ===
Boys' singles
Year	Venue	Opponent	Score	Result
1999	National Indoor Stadium – 1, Yangon, Myanmar	(China) Xiao Li	15–9, 13–15, 6–15	Silver

Boys' doubles
Year	Venue	Partner	Opponent	Score	Result
1999	National Indoor Stadium – 1, Yangon, Myanmar	(China) Chen Yu	(Indonesia) Hendri Kurniawan Saputra (Indonesia) Wandri Kurniawan Saputra	15–6, 15–2	Gold
2000	Nishiyama Park Gymnasium, Kyoto, Japan	(China) Zheng Bo	(South Korea) Jung Jae-sung (South Korea) Lee Jae-jin	17–16, 11–15, 15–12	Gold

Mixed doubles
Year	Venue	Partner	Opponent	Score	Result
2000	Nishiyama Park Gymnasium, Kyoto, Japan	(China) Zhang Yawen	(China) Zheng Bo (China) Wei Yili	Walkover	Silver

=== IBF World Grand Prix ===
The World Badminton Grand Prix sanctioned by International Badminton Federation (IBF) since 1983.

Men's doubles
Year	Tournament	Partner	Opponent	Score	Result
2003	Indonesia Open	(China) Zheng Bo	(Thailand) Tesana Panvisvas (Thailand) Pramote Teerawiwatana	16–17, 17–15, 15–5	(gold) Winner
2004	Korea Open	(China) Zheng Bo	(Indonesia) Luluk Hadiyanto (Indonesia) Alven Yulianto	12–15, 12–15	(silver) Runner-up

=== IBF International ===
Men's doubles
Year	Tournament	Partner	Opponent	Score	Result
2002	French International	(China) Zheng Bo	(China) Cheng Rui (China) Wang Wei	7–8, 1–7, 3–7	(silver) Runner-up

Mixed doubles
Year	Tournament	Partner	Opponent	Score	Result
2002	French International	(China) Zhao Tingting	(China) Zheng Bo (China) Zhang Yawen	0–7, 4–7, 8–7, 7–3, 6–8	(silver) Runner-up
