= 2009 BWF World Championships =

Tournament details
- Dates: 10 – 16 August
- Edition: 17th
- Level: International
- Venue: Gachibowli Indoor Stadium
- Location: Hyderabad, India

The 2009 BWF World Championships was the 17th tournament of the World Badminton Championships, a global tournament in the sport of badminton. It was held at the Gachibowli Indoor Stadium in Hyderabad, Andhra Pradesh, India, from 10–16 August 2009. It was the first World Championships tournament to be hosted by India.

Badminton England withdrew before the first round due to a perceived threat of terror against the team. They were later joined by two Austrian doubles players. Lin Dan won the men's singles event, thus becoming the only player in badminton history to have won three men's singles world championship titles having done so consecutively in 2006, 2007, and 2009. Lu Lan won the World Championship title in the women's singles event. Cai Yun and Fu Haifeng of China won the World Championship title in the men's doubles event in a match which was later dubbed a "classic". Zhang Yawen and Zhao Tingting won the World Championship title in the women's doubles event, whilst Thomas Laybourn and Kamilla Rytter Juhl of Denmark won the World Championship title in the mixed doubles event.

== Host city selection ==
Denmark, India, and Macau submitted bids to host the championships. India won the right to host the championships after the remaining candidates withdrew their bids.

== Venue ==
The 2009 BWF World Championships were held at the Gachibowli Indoor Stadium in Gachibowli, Hyderabad.

== Draw ==
The draw took place on 22 July 2009, featuring Chief Guest and Indian Sports Minister, Dr. M.S. Gill.

== Participating nations ==
=== Austria ===
Due to security worries Austrian doubles pair Peter Zauner and Jürgen Koch decided against participation in the 2009 BWF World Championships. The BWF issued a special statement calling the withdrawals "an individual decision on the part of the players". COO BWF Thomas Lund said: "I believe it is a matter of concern that teams haven’t been consulting us before pulling out, because all the necessary information is available with us which will allay fears". Lund declined to blame the Indian media for their part in the withdrawals: "I can’t say India as hosts have any reason to be blamed for a false newspaper report with threat perceptions which triggered these reactions."

=== Denmark ===
Denmark, who had not achieved a BWF World Championship singles win since 1999, and a men's title since 1997, took part. The country last won the men's doubles title in 2003.

=== England ===
The English badminton team decided against participation in the 2009 BWF World Championships, citing fears of a "terrorist threat", although, according to Hyderabad's police commission "there's no real threat, only a perception". Badminton England chief executive Adrian Christy called it "an incredibly tough decision and one we didn't take lightly". Christy said: "We were not prepared to risk the safety of our players, coaches and staff in what we felt could have been a very volatile environment".

== Medalists ==
=== Medal table ===
* Host nation (India)

Rank	Nation	Gold	Silver	Bronze	Total
1	China (CHN)	4	3	3	10
2	Denmark (DEN)	1	0	1	2
3	Indonesia (IDN)	0	1	2	3
4	South Korea (KOR)	0	1	1	2
5	Malaysia (MAS)	0	0	2	2
6	France (FRA)	0	0	1	1
Totals (6 entries)		5	5	10	20

=== Events ===
Event	Gold	Silver	Bronze
Men's singles	(China) Lin Dan	(China) Chen Jin	(Indonesia) Taufik Hidayat
Men's singles	(China) Lin Dan	(China) Chen Jin	(Indonesia) Sony Dwi Kuncoro
Women's singles	(China) Lu Lan	(China) Xie Xingfang	(China) Wang Lin
Women's singles	(China) Lu Lan	(China) Xie Xingfang	(France) Pi Hongyan
Men's doubles	(China) Fu Haifeng (China) Cai Yun	(South Korea) Jung Jae-sung (South Korea) Lee Yong-dae	(Malaysia) Mohd Zakry Abdul Latif (Malaysia) Mohd Fairuzizuan Tazari
Men's doubles	(China) Fu Haifeng (China) Cai Yun	(South Korea) Jung Jae-sung (South Korea) Lee Yong-dae	(Malaysia) Koo Kien Keat (Malaysia) Tan Boon Heong
Women's doubles	(China) Zhang Yawen (China) Zhao Tingting	(China) Cheng Shu (China) Zhao Yunlei	(China) Du Jing (China) Yu Yang
Women's doubles	(China) Zhang Yawen (China) Zhao Tingting	(China) Cheng Shu (China) Zhao Yunlei	(China) Ma Jin (China) Wang Xiaoli
Mixed doubles	(Denmark) Thomas Laybourn (Denmark) Kamilla Rytter Juhl	(Indonesia) Nova Widianto (Indonesia) Lilyana Natsir	(South Korea) Lee Yong-dae (South Korea) Lee Hyo-jung
Mixed doubles	(Denmark) Thomas Laybourn (Denmark) Kamilla Rytter Juhl	(Indonesia) Nova Widianto (Indonesia) Lilyana Natsir	(Denmark) Joachim Fischer Nielsen (Denmark) Christinna Pedersen

== See also ==
- Badminton at the Summer Olympics
