= 2005 Badminton World Cup =

Badminton championships

Tournament details
- Dates: 14–18 December 2005
- Edition: 20th
- Total prize money: US$250,000
- Venue: Olympic Park
- Location: Yiyang, Hunan, China

The 2005 Badminton World Cup was the twentieth edition of an international tournament Badminton World Cup. The event was held at the Olympic Sports Park in Yiyang, Hunan, China from 14 to 18 December 2005. It was sanctioned by the International Badminton Federation and Table Tennis and Badminton Administration Center under China's State General Administration of Sport, with a total prize money of US$250,000. This was the first time after 1997, this tournament was being conducted. Between 1997 and 2005, this tournament was halted due to various problems. In the end of the competitions, China won the titles in all 5 disciplines.

== Medallists ==
Event	Gold	Silver	Bronze
Men's singles	(China) Lin Dan	(Thailand) Boonsak Ponsana	(South Korea) Shon Seung-mo
Men's singles	(China) Lin Dan	(Thailand) Boonsak Ponsana	(China) Chen Hong
Women's singles	(China) Xie Xingfang	(China) Zhang Ning	(Netherlands) Yao Jie
Women's singles	(China) Xie Xingfang	(China) Zhang Ning	(China) Lu Lan
Men's doubles	(China) Cai Yun (China) Fu Haifeng	(Indonesia) Sigit Budiarto (Indonesia) Candra Wijaya	(Denmark) Jens Eriksen (Denmark) Martin Lundgaard Hansen
Men's doubles	(China) Cai Yun (China) Fu Haifeng	(Indonesia) Sigit Budiarto (Indonesia) Candra Wijaya	(United States) Howard Bach (United States) Tony Gunawan
Women's doubles	(China) Yang Wei (China) Zhang Jiewen	(China) Wei Yili (China) Zhang Yawen	(China) Zhang Dan (China) Zhao Tingting
Women's doubles	(China) Yang Wei (China) Zhang Jiewen	(China) Wei Yili (China) Zhang Yawen	(South Korea) Ha Jung-eun (South Korea) Kim Min-jung
Mixed doubles	(China) Xie Zhongbo (China) Zhang Yawen	(Indonesia) Nova Widianto (Indonesia) Liliyana Natsir	(Denmark) Jens Eriksen (Denmark) Mette Schjoldager
Mixed doubles	(China) Xie Zhongbo (China) Zhang Yawen	(Indonesia) Nova Widianto (Indonesia) Liliyana Natsir	(Thailand) Sudket Prapakamol (Thailand) Saralee Thungthongkam

== Men's singles ==
=== Finals ===
Semi-finals
(China) Lin Dan	21	6	21
(China) Chen Hong	14	21	6
(Thailand) Boonsak Ponsana	23	21
(South Korea) Shon Seung-mo	21	15

Final
(China) Lin Dan	21	21
(Thailand) Boonsak Ponsana	14	11

== Women's singles ==
=== Finals ===
Semi-finals
(China) Zhang Ning	w	/	o
(Netherlands) Yao Jie
(China) Lu Lan	11	19
(China) Xie Xingfang	21	21

Final
(China) Zhang Ning	19	16
(China) Xie Xingfang	21	21

== Men's doubles ==
=== Finals ===
Semi-finals
(China) Cai Yun (China) Fu Haifeng	21	21
(Denmark) Jens Eriksen (Denmark) Martin Lundgaard Hansen	14	12
(Indonesia) Sigit Budiarto (Indonesia) Candra Wijaya	21	21
(United States) Howard Bach (United States) Tony Gunawan	18	9

Final
(China) Cai Yun (China) Fu Haifeng	21	21
(Indonesia) Sigit Budiarto (Indonesia) Candra Wijaya	11	18

== Women's doubles ==
=== Finals ===
Semi-finals
(China) Yang Wei (China) Zhang Jiewen	15	21	21
(China) Zhang Dan (China) Zhao Tingting	21	9	10
(China) Wei Yili (China) Zhang Yawen	21	21
(South Korea) Ha Jung-eun (South Korea) Kim Min-jung	11	13

Final
(China) Yang Wei (China) Zhang Jiewen	21	21
(China) Wei Yili (China) Zhang Yawen	18	15

== Mixed doubles ==
=== Finals ===
Semi-finals
(China) Xie Zhongbo (China) Zhang Yawen	21	21
(Thailand) Sudket Prapakamol (Thailand) Saralee Thungthongkam	12	19
(Indonesia) Nova Widianto (Indonesia) Liliyana Natsir	21	21
(Denmark) Jens Eriksen (Denmark) Mette Schjoldager	15	18

Final
(China) Xie Zhongbo (China) Zhang Yawen	21	21
(Indonesia) Nova Widianto (Indonesia) Liliyana Natsir	19	9
