= 2004 Asian Badminton Championships =

Badminton championships

Tournament details
- Country: Malaysia
- City: Kuala Lumpur
- Venue(s): Kuala Lumpur Badminton Stadium
- Dates: April 20–25, 2004

The 2004 Asian Badminton Championships was the 23rd edition of the Asian Badminton Championships. It was held in Kuala Lumpur, Malaysia from April 20 to April 25, 2004.

== Medalists ==
Event	Gold	Silver	Bronze
Men's singles	(Indonesia) Taufik Hidayat	(Indonesia) Sony Dwi Kuncoro	(South Korea) Shon Seung-mo
Men's singles	(Indonesia) Taufik Hidayat	(Indonesia) Sony Dwi Kuncoro	(South Korea) Park Tae-sang
Women's singles	(South Korea) Jun Jae-youn	(Hong Kong) Wang Chen	(Japan) Kanako Yonekura
Women's singles	(South Korea) Jun Jae-youn	(Hong Kong) Wang Chen	(Japan) Kaori Mori
Men's doubles	(Indonesia) Sigit Budiarto and Tri Kusharyanto	(Indonesia) Candra Wijaya and Halim Haryanto	(Malaysia) Chan Chong Ming and Chew Choon Eng
Men's doubles	(Indonesia) Sigit Budiarto and Tri Kusharyanto	(Indonesia) Candra Wijaya and Halim Haryanto	(Indonesia) Flandy Limpele and Eng Hian
Women's doubles	(South Korea) Lee Hyo-jung and Lee Kyung-won	(China) Du Jing and Yu Yang	(Malaysia) Wong Pei Tty and Chin Eei Hui
Women's doubles	(South Korea) Lee Hyo-jung and Lee Kyung-won	(China) Du Jing and Yu Yang	(Thailand) Saralee Thungthongkam and Sathinee Chankrachangwong
Mixed doubles	(South Korea) Kim Dong-moon and Ra Kyung-min	(Thailand) Sudket Prapakamol and Saralee Thungthongkam	(Indonesia) Nova Widianto and Vita Marissa
Mixed doubles	(South Korea) Kim Dong-moon and Ra Kyung-min	(Thailand) Sudket Prapakamol and Saralee Thungthongkam	(China) Xie Zhongbo and Yu Yang

== Medal table ==
Rank	Nation	Gold	Silver	Bronze	Total
1	South Korea (KOR)	3	0	2	5
2	Indonesia (INA)	2	2	2	6
3	China (CHN)	0	1	1	2
3	Thailand (THA)	0	1	1	2
5	Hong Kong (HKG)	0	1	0	1
6	Japan (JPN)	0	0	2	2
6	Malaysia (MAS)	0	0	2	2
Totals (7 entries)		5	5	10	20

== Final results ==
=== Men's singles ===
Semi-finals
(Indonesia) Sony Dwi Kuncoro	15	15
(South Korea) Park Tae-sang	13	2
(Indonesia) Taufik Hidayat	15	15
(South Korea) Shon Seung-mo	9	6

Final
(Indonesia) Sony Dwi Kuncoro	12	15	6
(Indonesia) Taufik Hidayat	15	7	15

=== Women's singles ===
Semi-finals
(Hong Kong) Wang Chen	11	11
(Japan) Kaori Mori	4	2
(Japan) Kanako Yonekura	2	5
(South Korea) Jun Jae-youn	11	11

Final
(Hong Kong) Wang Chen	9	7
(South Korea) Jun Jae-youn	11	11

=== Men's doubles ===
Semi-finals
(Indonesia) Candra Wijaya (Indonesia) Halim Haryanto	15	15
(Indonesia) Eng Hian (Indonesia) Flandy Limpele	7	11
(Indonesia) Sigit Budiarto (Indonesia) Tri Kusharjanto	15	15
(Malaysia) Chan Chong Ming (Malaysia) Chew Choon Eng	8	9

Final
(Indonesia) Candra Wijaya (Indonesia) Halim Haryanto	13	5
(Indonesia) Sigit Budiarto (Indonesia) Tri Kusharjanto	15	15

=== Women's doubles ===
Semi-finals
(South Korea) Lee Hyo-jung (South Korea) Lee Kyung-won	17	4	15
(Malaysia) Chin Eei Hui (Malaysia) Wong Pei Tty	14	15	6
(China) Du Jing (China) Yu Yang	15	15
(Thailand) Sathinee Chankrachangwong (Thailand) Saralee Thungthongkam	10	7

Final
(South Korea) Lee Hyo-jung (South Korea) Lee Kyung-won	6	15	15
(China) Du Jing (China) Yu Yang	15	11	7

=== Mixed doubles ===
Semi-finals
(South Korea) Kim Dong-moon (South Korea) Ra Kyung-min	13	15	15
(Indonesia) Nova Widianto (Indonesia) Vita Marissa	15	7	3
(China) Xie Zhongbo (China) Yu Yang	3	11
(Thailand) Sudket Prapakamol (Thailand) Saralee Thungthongkam	15	15

Final
(South Korea) Kim Dong-moon (South Korea) Ra Kyung-min	15	17
(Thailand) Sudket Prapakamol (Thailand) Saralee Thungthongkam	10	16
