= Atu Rosalina =

Indonesian badminton player

Personal information
- Born: Atu Rosalina Sagita; 16 June 1981 (age 45) Bandung, West Java, Indonesia
- Height: 1.52 m (5 ft 0 in)

Sport
- Country: England
- Sport: Badminton
- Handedness: Right
- Event: Women's singles & doubles

Women's singles & doubles
- BWF profile
Medal record
Women's badminton
Representing Indonesia
Asian Junior Championships
Silver medal – second place	1999 Yangon	Girls' team
Bronze medal – third place	1999 Yangon	Girls' singles

Atu Rosalina Sagita (born 16 June 1981) is a former Indonesian badminton player, and now lived and playing badminton in England. Rosalina was part of the Indonesia junior team that won the girls' team silver at the 1999 Asian Junior Championships, and also won the bronze medal in the girls' singles event. She won the women's singles title at the 2001 Indonesian National Championships. Rosalina retired from the Indonesia national team in 2003, and moved to Brunei to work as sparing partner for the Royal Family. She then moved to Denmark and played at the Skælskør Badmintonklub in 2005, after that in France for the Chambly. Rosalina married to Agung Mandala, and lived in Colchester, England. As an English player, she was the semi-finalist at the 2016 National Championships, and reaching in to the final round in 2017.

== Achievements ==
=== Asian Junior Championships ===
Girls' singles
Year	Venue	Opponent	Score	Result
1999	National Indoor Stadium – 1 Yangon, Myanmar	(China) Hu Ting	8–11, 5–11	Bronze

=== BWF International Challenge/Series ===
Women's singles
Year	Tournament	Opponent	Score	Result
2001	Indonesia International	(Malaysia) Ng Mee Fen	11–5, 11–1	(gold) Winner
2005	Hungarian International	(Bulgaria) Petya Nedelcheva	11–6, 11–6	(gold) Winner
2006	Polish International	(Ukraine) Elena Nozdran	21–17, 21–13	(gold) Winner
2006	Hellas International	(Italy) Hui Ding		(silver) Runner-up
2010	Welsh International	(Malaysia) Anita Raj Kaur	21–23, 15–21	(silver) Runner-up
2011	Portugal International	(France) Sashina Vignes Waran	11–21, 15–21	(silver) Runner-up

Women's doubles
Year	Tournament	Partner	Opponent	Score	Result
2006	Austrian International	(Switzerland) Cynthia Tuwankotta	(Germany) Sandra Marinello (Germany) Kathrin Piotrowski	11–21, 21–19, 21–17	(gold) Winner
2006	Hellas International	(Germany) Claudia Vogelgsang	(Cyprus) Dometia Ioannou (Cyprus) Maria Ioannou		(gold) Winner
