= Nova Widianto =

Indonesian badminton player and coach

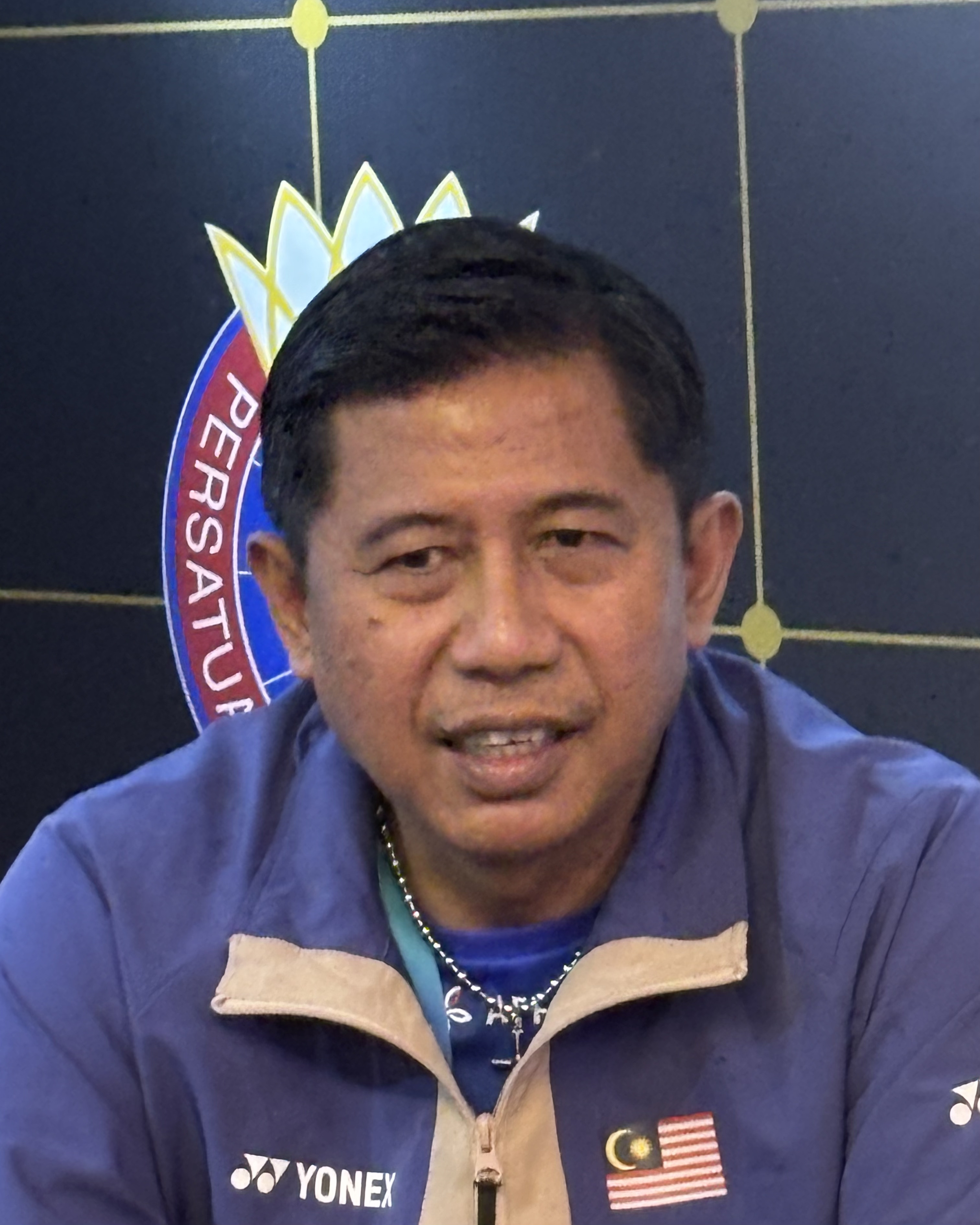
- Widianto during the 2026 Malaysia Open

Personal information
- Born: 10 October 1977 (age 49) Klaten, Central Java, Indonesia
- Height: 1.79 m (5 ft 10 in)
- Weight: 73 kg (161 lb)
- Spouse: Eny Widiowati

Sport
- Country: Indonesia
- Sport: Badminton
- Handedness: Right
- Coached by: Richard Mainaky
- Retired: September 2010
- Highest ranking: 1 (XD with Liliyana Natsir 15 May 2008)
Medal record
Men's badminton
Representing Indonesia
Olympic Games
Silver medal – second place	2008 Beijing	Mixed doubles
World Championships
Gold medal – first place	2005 Anaheim	Mixed doubles
Gold medal – first place	2007 Kuala Lumpur	Mixed doubles
Silver medal – second place	2009 Hyderabad	Mixed doubles
World Cup
Gold medal – first place	2006 Yiyang	Mixed doubles
Silver medal – second place	2005 Yiyang	Mixed doubles
Sudirman Cup
Silver medal – second place	2005 Beijing	Mixed team
Silver medal – second place	2007 Glasgow	Mixed team
Bronze medal – third place	2009 Guangzhou	Mixed team
Thomas Cup
Silver medal – second place	2010 Kuala Lumpur	Men's team
Bronze medal – third place	2008 Jakarta	Men's team
Asian Games
Silver medal – second place	2002 Busan	Men's team
Bronze medal – third place	2002 Busan	Mixed doubles
Bronze medal – third place	2006 Doha	Men's team
Asian Championships
Gold medal – first place	2003 Jakarta	Mixed doubles
Gold medal – first place	2006 Johor Bahru	Mixed doubles
Silver medal – second place	2008 Johor Bahru	Men's doubles
Silver medal – second place	2008 Johor Bahru	Mixed doubles
Bronze medal – third place	2004 Kuala Lumpur	Mixed doubles
SEA Games
Gold medal – first place	2001 Kuala Lumpur	Mixed doubles
Gold medal – first place	2005 Manila	Mixed doubles
Gold medal – first place	2007 Nakhon Ratchasima	Men's team
Gold medal – first place	2009 Vientiane	Mixed doubles
Gold medal – first place	2009 Vientiane	Men's team
Silver medal – second place	2001 Kuala Lumpur	Men's team
Silver medal – second place	2005 Manila	Men's team
Bronze medal – third place	2007 Nakhon Ratchasima	Mixed doubles

Andreas Nova Widianto (born 10 October 1977) is an Indonesian former badminton player, and now works as a mixed doubles badminton coach in Malaysia. After ended his duty as an Indonesian mixed doubles national coach, he moved to Malaysia joining the Badminton Association of Malaysia as a mixed doubles national coach on 1 January 2023.

== Career ==
Widianto specialized in mixed doubles. He enjoyed some international success with Vita Marissa, winning the SEA Games in 2001, the Asian Badminton Championships in 2003, and the Japan Open in 2004. However, his greatest success came from a partnership with Liliyana Natsir. In 2005, they won the World Championships in 2005, beating Xie Zhongbo and Zhang Yawen in the final. The pair won the gold medal at the 2007, by beating Zheng Bo and Gao Ling. They claimed the silver medals at the 2008 Olympic Games, lossing to the world number 10, Lee Yong Dae and Lee Hyo-jung. At the 2009 BWF World Championships, they also earned the silver medal, losing to the Danish pair. He was the runner up three times in a row, from 2006 to 2008, at the Japan open. They have been runner up at the All England Championships twice, including 2010 when they were beaten by future Olympic champion, Zhang Nan and Zhao Yunlei, 18-21 25-23 18–21 in an hour and 31 minutes. Widianto has represented Indonesia in the Sudirman Cup (combined men's and women's world team championships) five times: 2001, 2003, 2005, 2007 and 2009.

=== 2004 Summer Olympics ===
He competed in badminton at the 2004 Summer Olympics at the Goudi Olympic Hall, Athens, Greece, in the mixed doubles with partner Vita Marissa and reached the quarterfinal, where they were defeated by the Danish pair.

2004 Summer Olympics – Mixed doubles
Round	Partner	Opponent	Score	Result
First round	(Indonesia) Vita Marissa [8]	-	Bye	Win
Second Round	(Indonesia) Vita Marissa [8]	(United Kingdom) Robert Blair (United Kingdom) Natalie Munt	15–8, 15–12	Win
Quarterfinal	(Indonesia) Vita Marissa [8]	(Denmark) Jens Eriksen (Denmark) Mette Schjoldager	12–15, 8–15	Lost

=== 2008 Summer Olympics ===
He competed in badminton at the 2008 Summer Olympics as the 1st seed in the mixed doubles with partner Liliyana Natsir and reached the final by beating He Hanbin and Yu Yang in the semifinal with thrilling scores, 15–21 21–11 23–21. In the final, they were defeated by gold medalists, Lee Yong-dae and Lee Hyo-jung of South Korea in straight sets, 21–11 and 21–17.

2008 Summer Olympics – Mixed doubles
Round	Partner	Opponent	Score	Result
First round	(Indonesia) Liliyana Natsir [1]	(South Korea) Han Sang-hoon (South Korea) Hwang Yu-mi	23–21, 21–19	Win
Quarterfinal	(Indonesia) Liliyana Natsir [1]	(Thailand) Sudket Prapakamol (Thailand) Saralee Thungthongkam	21–13, 21–19	Win
Semifinal	(Indonesia) Liliyana Natsir [1]	(China) He Hanbin [4] (China) Yu Yang	15–21, 21–11, 23–21	Win
Final	(Indonesia) Liliyana Natsir [1]	(South Korea) Lee Yong-dae (South Korea) Lee Hyo-jung	11–21, 17–21	Silver

== Men's doubles ==
He also followed some tournaments in men's doubles. He played with Candra Wijaya for a few months, preparing for Thomas Cup event and succeeded to be the runner up of Asian Badminton Championships, lost to Jung Jae Sung and Lee Yong-dae in the final, 21–16 21–18. He also helped Indonesia to claim gold medal in men's team in Southeast Asian Games, partnering with Mohammad Ahsan and beat Mohd Zakry Abdul Latif and Mohd Fairuzizuan Mohd Tazari, 21–18 21–17 to give 3–1 win against Malaysia .

== Achievements ==
=== Olympic Games ===
Mixed doubles
Year	Venue	Partner	Opponent	Score	Result
2008	Beijing University of Technology Gymnasium, Beijing, China	(Indonesia) Liliyana Natsir	(South Korea) Lee Yong-dae (South Korea) Lee Hyo-jung	11–21, 17–21	Silver

=== BWF World Championships ===
Mixed doubles
Year	Venue	Partner	Opponent	Score	Result
2005	Arrowhead Pond, Anaheim, United States	(Indonesia) Liliyana Natsir	(China) Xie Zhongbo (China) Zhang Yawen	13–15, 15–8, 15–2	Gold
2007	Putra Indoor Stadium, Kuala Lumpur, Malaysia	(Indonesia) Liliyana Natsir	(China) Zheng Bo (China) Gao Ling	21–16, 21–14	Gold
2009	Gachibowli Indoor Stadium, Hyderabad, India	(Indonesia) Liliyana Natsir	(Denmark) Thomas Laybourn (Denmark) Kamilla Rytter Juhl	13–21, 17–21	Silver

=== World Cup ===
Mixed doubles
Year	Venue	Partner	Opponent	Score	Result
2005	Olympic Park, Yiyang, China	(Indonesia) Liliyana Natsir	(China) Xie Zhongbo (China) Zhang Yawen	19–21, 10–21	Silver
2006	Olympic Park, Yiyang, China	(Indonesia) Liliyana Natsir	(China) Xie Zhongbo (China) Zhang Yawen	21–16, 21–18	Gold

=== Asian Games ===
Mixed doubles
Year	Venue	Partner	Opponent	Score	Result
2002	Gangseo Gymnasium; Busan, South Korea	(Indonesia) Vita Marissa	(Thailand) Khunakorn Sudhisodhi (Thailand) Saralee Thungthongkam	11–5, 5–11, 5–11	Bronze

=== Asian Championships ===
Men's doubles
Year	Venue	Partner	Opponent	Score	Result
2008	Bandaraya Stadium; Johor Bahru, Malaysia	(Indonesia) Candra Wijaya	(South Korea) Jung Jae-sung (South Korea) Lee Yong-dae	16–21, 18–21	Silver

Mixed doubles
Year	Venue	Partner	Opponent	Score	Result
2003	Tennis Indoor Gelora Bung Karno; Jakarta, Indonesia	(Indonesia) Vita Marissa	(Indonesia) Anggun Nugroho (Indonesia) Eny Widiowati	15–2, 15–11	Gold
2004	Kuala Lumpur Badminton Stadium; Kuala Lumpur, Malaysia	(Indonesia) Vita Marissa	(South Korea) Kim Dong-moon (South Korea) Ra Kyung-min	15–13, 7–15, 3–15	Bronze
2006	Bandaraya Stadium; Johor Bahru, Malaysia	(Indonesia) Liliyana Natsir	(Thailand) Sudket Prapakamol (Thailand) Saralee Thungthongkam	21–16, 21–23, 21–14	Gold
2008	Bandaraya Stadium; Johor Bahru, Malaysia	(Indonesia) Liliyana Natsir	(Indonesia) Flandy Limpele (Indonesia) Vita Marissa	17–21, 17–21	Silver

=== SEA Games ===
Mixed doubles
Year	Venue	Partner	Opponent	Score	Result
2001	Malawati Stadium; Selangor, Malaysia	(Indonesia) Vita Marissa	(Indonesia) Bambang Suprianto (Indonesia) Emma Ermawati	3–15, 15–7, 17–15	Gold
2005	PhilSports Arena; Metro Manila, Philippines	(Indonesia) Liliyana Natsir	(Indonesia) Anggun Nugroho (Indonesia) Yunita Tetty	15–6, 15–2	Gold
2007	Wongchawalitkul University; Nakhon Ratchasima, Thailand	(Indonesia) Liliyana Natsir	(Thailand) Sudket Prapakamol (Thailand) Saralee Thungthongkam	21–13, 22–24, 16–21	Bronze
2009	Gym Hall 1, National Sports Complex; Vientiane, Laos	(Indonesia) Liliyana Natsir	(Thailand) Songphon Anugritayawon (Thailand) Kunchala Voravichitchaikul	21–10, 20–22, 21–9	Gold

=== BWF Superseries (5 titles, 9 runners-up) ===
The BWF Superseries, which was launched on 14 December 2006 and implemented in 2007, was a series of elite badminton tournaments, sanctioned by the Badminton World Federation (BWF). BWF Superseries levels were Superseries and Superseries Premier. A season of Superseries consisted of twelve tournaments around the world that had been introduced since 2011. Successful players were invited to the Superseries Finals, which were held at the end of each year.

Mixed doubles
Year	Tournament	Partner	Opponent	Score	Result
2007	Indonesia Open	(Indonesia) Liliyana Natsir	(China) Zheng Bo (China) Gao Ling	16–21, 11–21	(silver) Runner-up
2007	Japan Open	(Indonesia) Liliyana Natsir	(China) Zheng Bo (China) Gao Ling	19–21, 14–21	(silver) Runner-up
2007	China Open	(Indonesia) Liliyana Natsir	(Thailand) Sudket Prapakamol (Thailand) Saralee Thungthongkam	15–21, 21–18, 21–11	(gold) Winner
2007	Hong Kong Open	(Indonesia) Liliyana Natsir	(China) Zheng Bo (China) Gao Ling	21–23, 21–18, 21–19	(gold) Winner
2008	All England Open	(Indonesia) Liliyana Natsir	(China) Zheng Bo (China) Gao Ling	21–18, 14–21, 9–21	(silver) Runner-up
2008	Singapore Open	(Indonesia) Liliyana Natsir	(England) Anthony Clark (England) Donna Kellogg	17–21, 21–14, 21–9	(gold) Winner
2008	Japan Open	(Indonesia) Liliyana Natsir	(Indonesia) Muhammad Rijal (Indonesia) Vita Marissa	21–14, 15–21, 19–21	(silver) Runner-up
2008	China Masters	(Indonesia) Liliyana Natsir	(China) Xie Zhongbo (China) Zhang Yawen	17–21, 17–21	(silver) Runner-up
2008	Superseries Finals	(Indonesia) Liliyana Natsir	(Denmark) Thomas Laybourn (Denmark) Kamilla Rytter Juhl	19–21, 21–18, 20–22	(silver) Runner-up
2009	Malaysia Open	(Indonesia) Liliyana Natsir	(South Korea) Lee Yong-dae (South Korea) Lee Hyo-jung	21–14, 21–19	(gold) Winner
2009	French Open	(Indonesia) Liliyana Natsir	(Indonesia) Hendra Aprida Gunawan (Indonesia) Vita Marissa	21–7, 21–7	(gold) Winner
2009	Hong Kong Open	(Indonesia) Liliyana Natsir	(Poland) Robert Mateusiak (Poland) Nadieżda Kostiuczyk	20–22, 16–21	(silver) Runner-up
2010	All England Open	(Indonesia) Liliyana Natsir	(China) Zhang Nan (China) Zhao Yunlei	18–21, 25–23, 18–21	(silver) Runner-up
2010	Singapore Open	(Indonesia) Liliyana Natsir	(Denmark) Thomas Laybourn (Denmark) Kamilla Rytter Juhl	12–21, 15–21	(silver) Runner-up

BWF Super Series Finals tournament
BWF Super Series Premier tournament
BWF Super Series tournament

=== BWF/IBF Grand Prix (7 titles, 11 runners-up) ===
The BWF Grand Prix had two levels, the Grand Prix and Grand Prix Gold. It was a series of badminton tournaments sanctioned by the Badminton World Federation (BWF) and played between 2007 and 2017. The World Badminton Grand Prix was sanctioned by the International Badminton Federation from 1983 to 2006.

Mixed doubles
Year	Tournament	Partner	Opponent	Score	Result
2011	Thailand Open	(Indonesia) Vita Marissa	(Chinese Taipei) Lee Sheng-mu (Chinese Taipei) Chien Yu-chin	10–21, 21–23	(silver) Runner-up
2007	Philippines Open	(Indonesia) Liliyana Natsir	(South Korea) Han Sang-hoon (South Korea) Hwang Yu-mi	21–17, 21–13	(gold) Winner
2006	Japan Open	(Indonesia) Liliyana Natsir	(Indonesia) Flandy Limpele (Indonesia) Vita Marissa	21–11, 18–21, 17–21	(silver) Runner-up
2006	Hong Kong Open	(Indonesia) Liliyana Natsir	(China) Zheng Bo (China) Zhao Tingting	20–22, 19–21	(silver) Runner-up
2006	Korea Open	(Indonesia) Liliyana Natsir	(Denmark) Jens Eriksen (Denmark) Mette Schjoldager	23–21, 21–18	(gold) Winner
2006	Chinese Taipei Open	(Indonesia) Liliyana Natsir	(South Korea) Lee Jae-jin (South Korea) Lee Hyo-jung	17–21, 23–21, 21–13	(gold) Winner
2006	Singapore Open	(Indonesia) Liliyana Natsir	(England) Nathan Robertson (England) Gail Emms	21–16, 20–22, 23–21	(gold) Winner
2006	Indonesia Open	(Indonesia) Liliyana Natsir	(China) Xie Zhongbo (China) Zhang Yawen	19–21, 15–21	(silver) Runner-up
2005	Indonesia Open	(Indonesia) Liliyana Natsir	(Indonesia) Anggun Nugroho (Indonesia) Yunita Tetty	15–13, 15–1	(gold) Winner
2005	Swiss Open	(Indonesia) Liliyana Natsir	(England) Nathan Robertson (England) Gail Emms	14–17, 6–15	(silver) Runner-up
2004	Singapore Open	(Indonesia) Liliyana Natsir	(Malaysia) Koo Kien Keat (Malaysia) Wong Pei Tty	15–1, 15–4	(gold) Winner
2004	Japan Open	(Indonesia) Vita Marissa	(Thailand) Sudket Prapakamol (Thailand) Saralee Thungthongkam	15–10, 15–13	(gold) Winner
2003	Chinese Taipei Open	(Indonesia) Vita Marissa	(South Korea) Kim Dong-moon (South Korea) Ra Kyung-min	7–15, 5–15	(silver) Runner-up
2002	Japan Open	(Indonesia) Vita Marissa	(South Korea) Kim Dong-moon (South Korea) Ra Kyung-min	3–7, 2–7, 2–7	(silver) Runner-up
2002	Indonesia Open	(Indonesia) Vita Marissa	(Indonesia) Bambang Suprianto (Indonesia) Minarti Timur	7–11, 3–11	(silver) Runner-up
2002	Denmark Open	(Indonesia) Vita Marissa	(South Korea) Kim Dong-moon (South Korea) Hwang Yu-mi	6–11, 11–4, 7–11	(silver) Runner-up
2002	Chinese Taipei Open	(Indonesia) Vita Marissa	(Indonesia) Tri Kusharjanto (Indonesia) Emma Ermawati	11–8, 11–13, 7–11	(silver) Runner-up
2001	Indonesia Open	(Indonesia) Vita Marissa	(Indonesia) Tri Kusharjanto (Indonesia) Emma Ermawati	5–7, 1–7, 7–2, 1–7	(silver) Runner-up

BWF Grand Prix Gold tournament
BWF Grand Prix tournament

=== IBF International (1 title, 1 runner-up) ===
Men's doubles
Year	Tournament	Partner	Opponent	Score	Result
1998	Jakarta International	(Indonesia) Karel Mainaky	(Indonesia) Luluk Hadiyanto (Indonesia) Aras Razak	15–11, 11–15, 15–11	(gold) Winner

Mixed doubles
Year	Tournament	Partner	Opponent	Score	Result
1998	Jakarta International	(Indonesia) Eny Widiowati	(Indonesia) Endra Mulyana Mulyajaya (Indonesia) Angeline de Pauw	4–15, 7–15	(silver) Runner-up

== Performance timeline ==
=== Indonesian team ===
- Senior level

Team event	2001	2005	2007	2009
SEA Games	Silver	Silver	Gold	Gold

Team event	2002	2006
Asian Games	Silver	Bronze

Team events	2008	2010
Thomas Cup	Bronze	Silver

Team event	2005	2007	2009
Sudirman Cup	Silver	Silver	Bronze

=== Individual competitions ===
- Senior level

Event	2001	2005	2007	2009
SEA Games	Gold	Gold	Bronze	Gold

Event	2003	2004	2006	2008
Asian Championships	Gold (XD)	Bronze (XD)	Gold (XD)	Silver (MD); Silver (XD)

Event	2002	2006
Asian Games	Bronze	QF

Event	2005	2006
World Cup	Silver	Gold

Event	2001	2003	2005	2006	2007	2009	2010
BWF World Championships	QF	R2	Gold	R3	Gold	Silver	QF

Event	2004	2008
Olympics	QF	Silver

Tournament	2007	2008	2009	2010	2011	2012	Best
BWF Super Series
All England Open	QF	F	QF	F	R1	A	F (2008, 2010)
(Switzerland) Swiss Open	A	SF	QF	A	GPG		SF (2008)
India Open	—N/a	GPG			QF	A	QF (2011)
Malaysia Open	SF	QF	W	R1	R1	R1	W (2009)
Singapore Open	SF	W	SF	F	R1	A	W (2004, 2006, 2008)
China Masters	SF	F	A	SF	R2	A	F (2008)
Indonesia Open	F	SF	QF	SF	R1	A	W (2005)
Japan Open	F	F	SF	R2	R2	A	W (2004)
(South Korea) Korea Open	R2	R1	R2	A	R2	R1	W (2006)
Denmark Open	R1	A	QF	A	R1	A	F (2002)
(France) French Open	QF	SF	W	A	QF	A	W (2009)
China Open	W	A			R1	A	W (2007)
Hong Kong Open	W	QF	F	A			W (2007)
BWF Superseries Finals	—N/a	F	NQ				F (2008)

Tournament	2001	2002	2003	2004	2005	2006	2007	2008	2009	2010	2011	Best
BWF Grand Prix and Grand Prix Gold
Chinese Taipei Open	—N/a	F	F			W	SF			A	R2	W (2006)
Denmark Open	SF	F			A		SS					F (2002)
Hong Kong Open		—N/a		—N/a		F	SS					F (2006)
Indonesia Open	F	F		QF	W	F	SS					W (2005)
Japan Open		F		W		F	SS					W (2004)
(South Korea) Korea Open						W	SS					W (2006)
Philippines Open	—N/a						W	—N/a	A	—N/a		W (2007)
Singapore Open	QF			W		W	SS					W (2004, 2006)
(Switzerland) Swiss Open					F		SS					F (2005)
Thailand Open		—N/a								—N/a	F	F (2011)
