= Badminton at the 2002 Asian Games – Mixed doubles =

Mixed doubles at the 2002 Asian Games
- Venue: Gangseo Gymnasium
- Dates: 10–13 October
- Competitors: 30 from 8 nations

Medalists
gold medal	Kim Dong-moon; Ra Kyung-min	South Korea
silver medal	Khunakorn Sudhisodhi; Saralee Thungthongkam	Thailand
bronze medal	Chen Qiqiu; Zhang Jiewen	China
bronze medal	Nova Widianto; Vita Marissa	Indonesia

The badminton mixed doubles tournament at the 2002 Asian Games in Busan took place from 10 November to 13 November at Gangseo Gymnasium.

15 teams from 8 nations entered for the tournament, and the Korean duo of Ra Kyung-min and Kim Dong-moon won the gold in this tournament with a two-set victory over Thailand's Khunakorn Sudhisodhi and Saralee Thungthongkam. China and Indonesia shared the bronze medal.

== Schedule ==
All times are Korea Standard Time (UTC+09:00)

Date	Time	Event
Thursday, 10 October 2002	17:00	Preliminaries 1st
Friday, 11 October 2002	14:00	Quarterfinals
Saturday, 12 October 2002	14:00	Semifinals
Sunday, 13 October 2002	14:00	Final

== Results ==
Preliminaries 1st
Sudket Prapakamol (THA); Sathinee Chankrachangwong (THA)	13	11
Liu Kwok Wa (HKG); Wang Chen (HKG)	10	4
3	Tri Kusharjanto (INA); Emma Ermawati (INA)	11	9	11
Tadashi Otsuka (JPN); Shizuka Yamamoto (JPN)	5	11	0
Chen Qiqiu (CHN); Zhang Jiewen (CHN)	11	11
Chang Kim Wai (MAS); Wong Pei Tty (MAS)	5	2
Hosemari Fujimoto (JPN); Seiko Yamada (JPN)	6	6
Lee Jae-jin (KOR); Hwang Yu-mi (KOR)	11	11
Chew Choon Eng (MAS); Chin Eei Hui (MAS)	5	6
4	Khunakorn Sudhisodhi (THA); Saralee Thungthongkam (THA)	11	11
O Man Tong (MAC); Long Ying (MAC)	1	2
Zhang Jun (CHN); Gao Ling (CHN)	11	11
Yau Tsz Yuk (HKG); Koon Wai Chee (HKG)	5	5
2	Nova Widianto (INA); Vita Marissa (INA)	11	11

Quarterfinals
1	Kim Dong-moon (KOR); Ra Kyung-min (KOR)	11	11
Sudket Prapakamol (THA); Sathinee Chankrachangwong (THA)	4	4
3	Tri Kusharjanto (INA); Emma Ermawati (INA)	11	6	9
Chen Qiqiu (CHN); Zhang Jiewen (CHN)	6	11	11
Lee Jae-jin (KOR); Hwang Yu-mi (KOR)	9	13	9
4	Khunakorn Sudhisodhi (THA); Saralee Thungthongkam (THA)	11	10	11
Zhang Jun (CHN); Gao Ling (CHN)	7	4
2	Nova Widianto (INA); Vita Marissa (INA)	11	11

Semifinals
1	Kim Dong-moon (KOR); Ra Kyung-min (KOR)	11	11
Chen Qiqiu (CHN); Zhang Jiewen (CHN)	6	0
4	Khunakorn Sudhisodhi (THA); Saralee Thungthongkam (THA)	5	11	11
2	Nova Widianto (INA); Vita Marissa (INA)	11	5	5

Finals
1	Kim Dong-moon (KOR); Ra Kyung-min (KOR)	11	11
4	Khunakorn Sudhisodhi (THA); Saralee Thungthongkam (THA)	4	0
