= Kennevic Asuncion =

Filipino badminton player (born 1980)

Personal information
- Born: 21 March 1980 (age 46) Barbaza, Antique, Philippines

Sport
- Country: Philippines
- Sport: Badminton
- Handedness: Right

Men's and mixed doubles
- Highest ranking: 117 (MD with Antonio Benjamin Gadi 10 June 2010); 11 (XD with Kennie Asuncion)
- BWF profile
Medal record
Men's badminton
Representing Philippines
Southeast Asian Games
| Bronze medal – third place | 2003 Vietnam | Mixed doubles |

Kennevic Asuncion (Chinese: 洪育雄; born March 21, 1980) is a male badminton player from the Philippines. He was born in Barbaza, Antique and is the son of former Philippine Badminton Team Coach Nelson Asuncion. He plays doubles with his sister Kennie Asuncion.

The brother-sister team used to host a now defunct local badminton TV show, Badminton Extreme along with their father. The show was canceled due to the siblings' training for the 2008 Beijing Olympics. In its steed a magazine called Badminton Extreme was released.

He won several international tournaments including the Peru Open.

== Career ==
Asuncion played at the 2006 Philippine Open Grand Prix Gold in mixed doubles. He beat Indonesia's Tri Kusharjanto and Minarti Timur 21–15, 21–10 before losing to Sudket Prapakamol and Saralee Thungthongkam of Thailand in the finals.

He played for the 2009 Sudirman Cup in Guangzhou, China; with the other Filipino players, including his sister Kennie. They showed good results in the said mixed team championships where they beat South Africa with a 1–4 score, before losing to Switzerland 4–1.

He is currently coaching the University of the Philippines and in the International School Manila' Badminton Team.

== Achievements ==
=== BWF Grand Prix ===
The BWF Grand Prix had two levels, the BWF Grand Prix and Grand Prix Gold. It was a series of badminton tournaments sanctioned by the Badminton World Federation (BWF) which was held from 2007 to 2017. The World Badminton Grand Prix sanctioned by International Badminton Federation (IBF) from 1983 to 2006.

Mixed doubles
| Year | Tournament | Partner | Opponent | Score | Result |
|---|---|---|---|---|---|
| 2006 | Philippines Open | (Philippines) Kennie Asuncion | (Thailand) Sudket Prapakamol (Thailand) Saralee Thungthongkam | 18–21, 16–21 | (silver) Runner-up |

BWF Grand Prix Gold tournament
BWF Grand Prix tournament

=== BWF International Challenge/Series (5 titles) ===
Mixed Doubles
| Year | Tournament | Partner | Opponent | Score | Result |
|---|---|---|---|---|---|
| 2005 | Peru International | (Philippines) Kennie Asuncion | (Spain) José Antonio Crespo (Spain) Yoana Martinez | 15-11, 12–15, 15–12 | (gold) Winner |
| 2006 | Ballarat International | (Philippines) Kennie Asuncion | (Australia) Renuga Veeran (Australia) Raj Veeran | 18-21, 21–14, 21–17 | (gold) Winner |
| 2006 | North Harbour International | (Philippines) Kennie Asuncion | (New Zealand) Daniel Shirley (New Zealand) Gabby Shirley | 17-21, 21–17, 21–13 | (gold) Winner |
| 2010 | Maldives International | (United States) Karyn Velez | (Sri Lanka) Udara Nayanajith (Sri Lanka) Chandrika de Silva | 24-22, 17–21, 21–13 | (gold) Winner |
| 2010 | Lao International | (Philippines) Kennie Asuncion | (Thailand) Siriwat Matayanumati (Thailand) Pattaraporn Jindapol | 11-21, 21–16, 21–17 | (gold) Winner |

BWF International Challenge tournament
BWF International Series tournament
BWF Future Series tournament
