= 1999 Asian Junior Badminton Championships =

Tournament details
- Dates: 11-17 July 1999
- Venue: National Indoor Stadium – 1
- Location: Yangon, Myanmar

The 1999 Asian Junior Badminton Championships were held in Yangon, Myanmar from 11–17 July. This tournament organized by the Asian Badminton Confederation, and there were 24 countries and regions with more than 350 players and officials participated in the Championships.

== Venue ==
The tournament was held at the National Indoor Stadium – 1 in Thuwunna, Yangon, Myanmar.

== Medalists ==
China and Indonesia captured a team gold and silver medal in the girls' and boys' team respectively. Korea and Malaysia shared third place in the boys' team event. In the girls' team event, Taiwan and Korea were co-bronze medalists. In the girls' team final, China beat Indonesia with the score 5–0, and Indonesia beat the China boys' team with the score 3–2. In the individuals event, Chinese squad took four of the five titles. Only the mixed doubles crown eluded the Chinese team when Indonesians Hendri Kurniawan Saputra and Enny Erlangga defeated China's Zheng Bo and Wei Yili in straight game 15–12 and 17–16.

Event	Gold	Silver	Bronze
Boys' teams	Indonesia; Endra Feriyanto; Wiempie Mahardi; Bobby Santoso; Hendri Kurniawan Saputra; Wandry Kurniawan Saputra	China; Chen Yu; Lin Dan; Lin Guangyun; Sang Yang; Xiao Li; Xie Zhongbo; Zhang Weihong; Zheng Bo; Zhu Weilun	South Korea; Cho Han-sung; Heo Hoon-hoi; Jang Young-soo; Jung Jae-sung; Lee Jae-jin; Lee Seung-yoon
Boys' teams	Indonesia; Endra Feriyanto; Wiempie Mahardi; Bobby Santoso; Hendri Kurniawan Saputra; Wandry Kurniawan Saputra	China; Chen Yu; Lin Dan; Lin Guangyun; Sang Yang; Xiao Li; Xie Zhongbo; Zhang Weihong; Zheng Bo; Zhu Weilun	Malaysia; Alvin Chew; Gan Teik Chai; Charles Khoo; Yogendran Khrishnan; Kuan Beng Hong; Nazri Latifi; Gavin Liew; Teo Kok Seng
Girls' teams	China; Hu Ting; Li Yujia; Wei Yan; Wei Yili; Xie Xingfang; Zhang Jiewen; Zhang Yawen; Zhao Tingting	Indonesia; Siang Chiung; Enny Erlangga; Atu Rosalina; Mona Santoso; Dian Novita Sari	Chinese Taipei; Cheng Wen-hsing; Chien Hsiu-un; Chien Yu-chin; Chiu Yi-ju; Chou Chia-chi; Huang Chia-hsin; Ku Pei-ting; Kung Ya-tzu; Lin Hsiao-hui
Girls' teams	China; Hu Ting; Li Yujia; Wei Yan; Wei Yili; Xie Xingfang; Zhang Jiewen; Zhang Yawen; Zhao Tingting	Indonesia; Siang Chiung; Enny Erlangga; Atu Rosalina; Mona Santoso; Dian Novita Sari	South Korea; Hwang Yu-mi; Joo Hyun-hee; Jun Jae-youn; Lee Kyung-ok; Kim Hee-jung; Si Jin-sun
Boys' singles	(China) Xiao Li	(China) Sang Yang	(Malaysia) Alvin Chew
Boys' singles	(China) Xiao Li	(China) Sang Yang	(Hong Kong) Ng Wei
Girls' singles	(China) Hu Ting	(China) Wei Yan	(Indonesia) Atu Rosalina
Girls' singles	(China) Hu Ting	(China) Wei Yan	(China) Zhang Yawen
Boys' doubles	(China) Sang Yang (China) Chen Yu	(Indonesia) Hendri Kurniawan Saputra (Indonesia) Wandry Kurniawan Saputra	(China) Lin Dan (China) Zheng Bo
Boys' doubles	(China) Sang Yang (China) Chen Yu	(Indonesia) Hendri Kurniawan Saputra (Indonesia) Wandry Kurniawan Saputra	(China) Xie Zhongbo (China) Zhang Weihong
Girls' doubles	(China) Xie Xingfang (China) Zhang Jiewen	(China) Wei Yili (China) Li Yujia	(South Korea) Joo Hyun-hee (South Korea) Si Jin-sun
Girls' doubles	(China) Xie Xingfang (China) Zhang Jiewen	(China) Wei Yili (China) Li Yujia	(China) Zhao Tingting (China) Zhang Yawen
Mixed doubles	(Indonesia) Hendri Kurniawan Saputra (Indonesia) Enny Erlangga	(China) Zheng Bo (China) Wei Yili	(China) Xie Zhongbo (China) Zhang Jiewen
Mixed doubles	(Indonesia) Hendri Kurniawan Saputra (Indonesia) Enny Erlangga	(China) Zheng Bo (China) Wei Yili	(South Korea) Heo Hoon-hoi (South Korea) Hwang Yu-mi

== Results ==
=== Semifinals ===
Category	Winner	Runner-up	Score
Boys' singles	(China) Sang Yang	(Hong Kong) Ng Wei	15–10, 10–15, 15–11
Boys' singles	(China) Xiao Li	(Malaysia) Alvin Chew	15–10, 15–4
Girls' singles	(China) Hu Ting	(Indonesia) Atu Rosalina	11–8, 11–5
Girls' singles	(China) Wei Yan	(China) Zhang Yawen	11–4, 11–1
Boys' doubles	(Indonesia) Hendri Kurniawan Saputra (Indonesia) Wandry Kurniawan Saputra	(China) Xie Zhongbo (China) Zhang Weihong	17–16, 15–8
Boys' doubles	(China) Sang Yang (China) Chen Yu	(China) Lin Dan (China) Zheng Bo	10–15, 15–3, 15–10
Girls' doubles	(China) Li Yujia (China) Wei Yili	(China) Zhang Yawen (China) Zhao Tingting	15–7, 15–10
Girls' doubles	(China) Xie Xingfang (China) Zhang Jiewen	(South Korea) Joo Hyun-hee (South Korea) Si Jin-sun	16–17, 15–4, 15–11
Mixed doubles	(Indonesia) Hendri Kurniawan Saputra (Indonesia) Enny Erlangga	(China) Xie Zhongbo (China) Zhang Jiewen	17–14, 15–12
Mixed doubles	(China) Zheng Bo (China) Wei Yili	(South Korea) Heo Hoon-hoi (South Korea) Hwang Yu-mi	15–5, 15–5

=== Finals ===
Category	Winners	Runners-up	Score
Boys' singles	(China) Xiao Li	(China) Sang Yang	9–15, 15–13, 15–6
Girls' singles	(China) Hu Ting	(China) Wei Yan	2–11, 13–11, 11–7
Boys' doubles	(China) Chen Yu (China) Sang Yang	(Indonesia) Hendri Kurniawan Saputra (Indonesia) Wandry Kurniawan Saputra	15–6, 15–2
Girls' doubles	(China) Xie Xingfang (China) Zhang Jiewen	(China) Li Yujia (China) Wei Yili	15–9, 15–6
Mixed doubles	(Indonesia) Hendri Kurniawan Saputra (Indonesia) Enny Erlangga	(China) Zheng Bo (China) Wei Yili	15–12, 17–16

== Medal table ==
Rank	Nation	Gold	Silver	Bronze	Total
1	China (CHN)	5	5	5	15
2	Indonesia (INA)	2	2	1	5
3	South Korea (KOR)	0	0	4	4
4	Malaysia (MAS)	0	0	2	2
5	Chinese Taipei (TPE)	0	0	1	1
5	Hong Kong (HKG)	0	0	1	1
Totals (6 entries)		7	7	14	28
