= Saralee Thungthongkam =

Thai badminton player (born 1979)

Saralee Thungthongkam สราลีย์ ทุ่งทองคำ
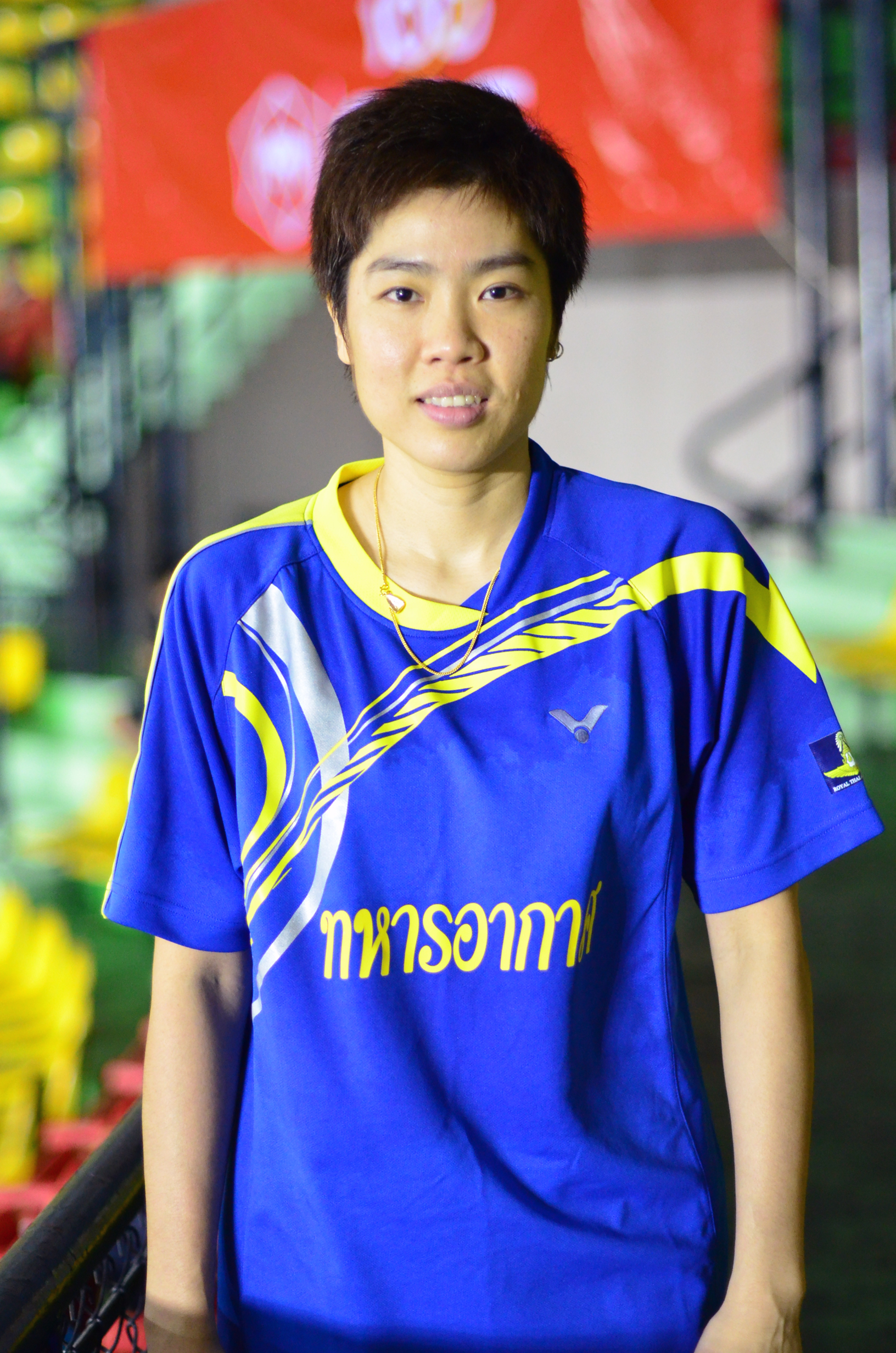

Personal information
- Nickname: Som
- Born: 13 June 1979 (age 47) Bangkok, Thailand
- Height: 1.63 m (5 ft 4 in)
- Weight: 58 kg (128 lb)

Sport
- Country: Thailand
- Sport: Badminton
- Handedness: Right
- Retired: February 2016

Women's & mixed doubles
- Highest ranking: 21 (WD 19 September 2013); 2 (XD 11 August 2011)
- BWF profile
Medal record
Women's badminton
Representing Thailand
World Championships
Bronze medal – third place	2005 Anaheim	Mixed doubles
Bronze medal – third place	2006 Madrid	Mixed doubles
World Cup
Bronze medal – third place	2005 Yiyang	Mixed doubles
Sudirman Cup
Bronze medal – third place	2013 Kuala Lumpur	Mixed team
Uber Cup
Bronze medal – third place	2012 Wuhan	Women's team
Asian Games
Silver medal – second place	2002 Busan	Mixed doubles
Silver medal – second place	2010 Guangzhou	Women's team
Bronze medal – third place	2002 Busan	Women's team
Bronze medal – third place	2006 Doha	Mixed doubles
Asian Championships
Gold medal – first place	2005 Hyderabad	Mixed doubles
Silver medal – second place	2002 Bangkok	Mixed doubles
Silver medal – second place	2004 Kuala Lumpur	Mixed doubles
Silver medal – second place	2006 Johor Bahru	Mixed doubles
Bronze medal – third place	1999 Kuala Lumpur	Women's doubles
Bronze medal – third place	2002 Bangkok	Women's doubles
Bronze medal – third place	2004 Kuala Lumpur	Women's doubles
Bronze medal – third place	2011 Chengdu	Mixed doubles
Bronze medal – third place	2014 Gimcheon	Mixed doubles
Southeast Asian Games
Gold medal – first place	2003 Vietnam	Mixed doubles
Gold medal – first place	2005 Manila	Women's team
Gold medal – first place	2011 Jakarta–Palembang	Women's team
Silver medal – second place	1997 Jakarta	Women's team
Silver medal – second place	1999 Bandar Seri Begawan	Women's team
Silver medal – second place	2001 Kuala Lumpur	Women's team
Silver medal – second place	2003 Vietnam	Women's team
Silver medal – second place	2007 Nakhon Ratchasima	Mixed doubles
Silver medal – second place	2011 Jakarta–Palembang	Mixed doubles
Bronze medal – third place	1999 Bandar Seri Begawan	Women's doubles
Bronze medal – third place	1999 Bandar Seri Begawan	Mixed doubles
Bronze medal – third place	2001 Kuala Lumpur	Mixed doubles
Bronze medal – third place	2005 Manila	Women's doubles
Bronze medal – third place	2007 Nakhon Ratchasima	Women's team
Bronze medal – third place	2009 Vientiane	Women's team

Captain Saralee Thungthongkam (Thai: สราลีย์ ทุ่งทองคำ; RTGS: Sarali Thungthongkham; born 13 June 1979) is a Thai retired badminton player. She graduated with a master's degree in Communication Arts from Bangkok University.

== Career ==
Thungthongkam made her debut at the Olympic Games in 2000 Sydney. She reached the second round in both the women's and mixed doubles with partners Sujitra Ekmongkolpaisarn and Khunakorn Sudhisodhi.

Thungthongkam competed in 2004 Athens Olympics in the women's doubles with partner Sathinee Chankrachangwong. They defeated Denyse Julien and Anna Rice of Canada in the first round and Chikako Nakayama and Keiko Yoshimoti of Japan in the second. In the quarter finals, Thungthongkam and Chankrachangwong lost to Yang Wei and Zhang Jiewen of China 2–15, 4–15. She also competed in the mixed doubles with partner Sudket Prapakamol. They had a bye in the first run and were defeated by Fredrik Bergström and Johanna Persson of Sweden in the 16th round.

At the 2008 Beijing Olympics, she only competed in the mixed doubles, again with Prapakamol. They reached the quarter finals, losing to the Indonesian pair of Nova Widianto and Liliyana Natsir, who went on to win the silver medal.

Thungthongkam made her fourth appearance Olympic Games in 2012 London, where she again reached the quarter finals with Prapakamol. This time they lost to Christinna Pedersen and Joachim Fischer Nielsen of Denmark.

Thungthongkam ended her career in the international tournaments after got injured at the Thailand Masters in February 2016. She spent 19 years at the Thailand national team.

== Achievements ==
=== World Championships ===
Mixed doubles
Year	Venue	Partner	Opponent	Score	Result
2005	Arrowhead Pond, Anaheim, United States	(Thailand) Sudket Prapakamol	(Indonesia) Nova Widianto (Indonesia) Liliyana Natsir	9–15, 15–3, 10–15	Bronze
2006	Palacio de Deportes de la Comunidad; Madrid, Spain	(Thailand) Sudket Prapakamol	(England) Nathan Robertson (England) Gail Emms	18–21, 21–17, 23–25	Bronze

=== World Cup ===
Mixed doubles
Year	Venue	Partner	Opponent	Score	Result
2005	Olympic Park, Yiyang, China	(Thailand) Sudket Prapakamol	(China) Xie Zhongbo (China) Zhang Yawen	12–21, 19–21	Bronze

=== Asian Games ===
Mixed doubles
Year	Venue	Partner	Opponent	Score	Result
2002	Gangseo Gymnasium, Busan, South Korea	(Thailand) Khunakorn Sudhisodhi	(South Korea) Kim Dong-moon (South Korea) Ra Kyung-min	4–11, 0–11	Silver
2006	Aspire Hall 3, Doha, Qatar	(Thailand) Sudket Prapakamol	(China) Xie Zhongbo (China) Zhang Yawen	11–21, 19–21	Bronze

=== Asian Championships ===
Women's doubles
Year	Venue	Partner	Opponent	Score	Result
1999	Kuala Lumpur Badminton Stadium; Kuala Lumpur, Malaysia	(Thailand) Sujitra Ekmongkolpaisarn	(South Korea) Chung Jae-hee (South Korea) Ra Kyung-min	1–15, 8–15	Bronze
2002	Nimibutr Stadium; Bangkok, Thailand	(Thailand) Sathinee Chankrachangwong	(China) Yang Wei (China) Zhang Jiewen	6–11, 2–11	Bronze
2004	Kuala Lumpur Badminton Stadium; Kuala Lumpur, Malaysia	(Thailand) Sathinee Chankrachangwong	(China) Du Jing (China) Yu Yang	10–15, 7–15	Bronze

Mixed doubles
Year	Venue	Partner	Opponent	Score	Result
2002	Nimibutr Stadium; Bangkok, Thailand	(Thailand) Khunakorn Sudhisodhi	(China) Zhang Jun (China) Gao Ling	7–11, 8–11	Silver
2004	Kuala Lumpur Badminton Stadium; Kuala Lumpur, Malaysia	(Thailand) Sudket Prapakamol	(South Korea) Kim Dong-moon (South Korea) Ra Kyung-min	10–15, 16–17	Silver
2005	Gachibowli Indoor Stadium; Hyderabad, India	(Thailand) Sudket Prapakamol	(South Korea) Lee Jae-jin (South Korea) Lee Hyo-jung	15–11, 14–17, 15–10	Gold
2006	Bandaraya Stadium; Johor Bahru, Malaysia	(Thailand) Sudket Prapakamol	(Indonesia) Nova Widianto (Indonesia) Liliyana Natsir	16–21, 23–21, 14–21	Silver
2011	Sichuan Gymnasium; Chengdu, China	(Thailand) Sudket Prapakamol	(China) Xu Chen (China) Ma Jin	17–21, 15–21	Bronze
2014	Gimcheon Indoor Stadium; Gimcheon, South Korea	(Thailand) Sudket Prapakamol	(South Korea) Shin Baek-choel (South Korea) Jang Ye-na	11–21, 12–21	Bronze

=== Southeast Asian Games ===
Women's doubles
Year	Venue	Partner	Opponent	Score	Result
1999	Hassanal Bolkiah Sports Complex; Bandar Seri Begawan, Brunei	(Thailand) Sujitra Ekmongkolpaisarn	(Indonesia) Emma Ermawati (Indonesia) Indarti Isolina	10–15, 11–15	Bronze
2005	PhilSports Arena; Metro Manila, Philippines	(Thailand) Satinee Jankrajangwong	(Indonesia) Jo Novita (Indonesia) Greysia Polii	8–15, 15–17	Bronze

Mixed doubles
Year	Venue	Partner	Opponent	Score	Result
1999	Hassanal Bolkiah Sports Complex; Bandar Seri Begawan, Brunei	(Thailand) Khunakorn Sudhisodhi	(Malaysia) Rosman Razak (Malaysia) Norashikin Amin	16–17, 12–15	Bronze
2001	Malawati Stadium; Selangor, Malaysia	(Thailand) Khunakorn Sudhisodhi	(Indonesia) Bambang Suprianto (Indonesia) Emma Ermawati	11–15, 3–15	Bronze
2003	Tan Binh Sport Center; Ho Chi Minh City, Vietnam	(Thailand) Sudket Prapakamol	(Indonesia) Anggun Nugroho (Indonesia) Eny Widiowati	15–12, 15–7	Gold
2007	Wongchawalitkul University; Nakhon Ratchasima, Thailand	(Thailand) Sudket Prapakamol	(Indonesia) Flandy Limpele (Indonesia) Vita Marissa	14–21, 15–21	Silver
2011	Istora Senayan; Jakarta, Indonesia	(Thailand) Sudket Prapakamol	(Indonesia) Tontowi Ahmad (Indonesia) Liliyana Natsir	7–21, 14–21	Silver

=== BWF Superseries ===
The BWF Superseries, which was launched on 14 December 2006 and implemented in 2007, was a series of elite badminton tournaments, sanctioned by the Badminton World Federation (BWF). BWF Superseries levels were Superseries and Superseries Premier. A season of Superseries consisted of twelve tournaments around the world that had been introduced since 2011. Successful players were invited to the Superseries Finals, which were held at the end of each year.

Mixed doubles
Year	Tournament	Partner	Opponent	Score	Result
2007	Singapore Open	(Thailand) Sudket Prapakamol	(Indonesia) Flandy Limpele (Indonesia) Vita Marissa	14–21, 13–21	(silver) Runner-up
2007	China Open	(Thailand) Sudket Prapakamol	(Indonesia) Nova Widianto (Indonesia) Liliyana Natsir	21–15, 18–21, 11–21	(silver) Runner-up
2010	French Open	(Thailand) Sudket Prapakamol	(Germany) Michael Fuchs (Germany) Birgit Overzier	21–15, 21–15	(gold) Winner
2010	World Superseries Finals	(Thailand) Sudket Prapakamol	(China) Zhang Nan (China) Zhao Yunlei	17–21, 12–21	(silver) Runner-up
2011	All England Open	(Thailand) Sudket Prapakamol	(China) Xu Chen (China) Ma Jin	13–21, 9–21	(silver) Runner-up
2012	India Open	(Thailand) Sudket Prapakamol	(Indonesia) Tontowi Ahmad (Indonesia) Liliyana Natsir	16–21, 21–12, 14–21	(silver) Runner-up
2012	Indonesia Open	(Thailand) Sudket Prapakamol	(Indonesia) Tontowi Ahmad (Indonesia) Liliyana Natsir	21–17, 17–21, 21–13	(gold) Winner

BWF Super Series Finals tournament
BWF Super Series Premier tournament
BWF Super Series tournament

=== BWF Grand Prix ===
The BWF Grand Prix had two levels, the Grand Prix and Grand Prix Gold. It was a series of badminton tournaments sanctioned by the Badminton World Federation (BWF) and played between 2007 and 2017. The World Badminton Grand Prix was sanctioned by the International Badminton Federation from 1983 to 2006.

Women's doubles
Year	Tournament	Partner	Opponent	Score	Result
2001	Hong Kong Open	(Thailand) Sathinee Chankrachangwong	(Singapore) Liu Zhen (Singapore) Xiao Luxi	6–8, 7–3, 7–2, 7–8, 3–7	(silver) Runner-up
2002	Chinese Taipei Open	(Thailand) Sathinee Chankrachangwong	(South Korea) Hwang Yu-mi (South Korea) Lee Hyo-jung	4–11, 13–12, 11–8	(gold) Winner
2002	Indonesia Open	(Thailand) Sathinee Chankrachangwong	(China) Gao Ling (China) Huang Sui	5–11, 4–11	(silver) Runner-up
2002	Dutch Open	(Thailand) Sathinee Chankrachangwong	(Denmark) Ann-Lou Jorgensen (Denmark) Rikke Olsen	3–11, 5–11	(silver) Runner-up
2004	Singapore Open	(Thailand) Sathinee Chankrachangwong	(China) Yang Wei (China) Zhang Jiewen	5–15, 15–9, 11–15	(silver) Runner-up
2006	Thailand Open	(Thailand) Sathinee Chankrachangwong	(South Korea) Lee Hyo-jung (South Korea) Lee Kyung-won	18–21, 9–21	(silver) Runner-up
2012	Thailand Open	(Thailand) Narissapat Lam	(China) Cheng Shu (China) Pan Pan	21–15, 10–21, 21–13	(gold) Winner

Mixed doubles
Year	Tournament	Partner	Opponent	Score	Result
2001	Hong Kong Open	(Thailand) Khunakorn Sudhisodhi	(South Korea) Kim Dong-moon (South Korea) Ra Kyung-min	7–3, 0–7, 2–7, 2–7	(silver) Runner-up
2004	Thailand Open	(Thailand) Sudket Prapakamol	(England) Nathan Robertson (England) Gail Emms	15–8, 12–15, 11–15	(silver) Runner-up
2004	Japan Open	(Thailand) Sudket Prapakamol	(Indonesia) Nova Widianto (Indonesia) Vita Marissa	10–15, 13–15	(silver) Runner-up
2005	Japan Open	(Thailand) Sudket Prapakamol	(Denmark) Jens Eriksen (Denmark) Mette Schjoldager	15–13, 14–17, 15–7	(gold) Winner
2005	Singapore Open	(Thailand) Sudket Prapakamol	(China) Zhang Jun (China) Gao Ling	15–10, 7–15, 5–15	(silver) Runner-up
2006	Thailand Open	(Thailand) Sudket Prapakamol	(South Korea) Lee Yong-dae (South Korea) Hwang Yu-mi	11–21, 21–18, 20–22	(silver) Runner-up
2009	Thailand Open	(Thailand) Sudket Prapakamol	(Thailand) Songphon Anugritayawon (Thailand) Kunchala Voravichitchaikul	21–11, 17–21, 14–21	(silver) Runner-up
2010	Malaysia Masters	(Thailand) Sudket Prapakamol	(Indonesia) Devin Lahardi Fitriawan (Indonesia) Liliyana Natsir	21–13, 16–21, 17–21	(silver) Runner-up
2011	Dutch Open	(Thailand) Sudket Prapakamol	(Thailand) Songphon Anugritayawon (Thailand) Kunchala Voravichitchaikul	17–21, 22–24	(silver) Runner-up
2011	India Grand Prix Gold	(Thailand) Sudket Prapakamol	(Indonesia) Muhammad Rijal (Indonesia) Debby Susanto	16–21, 21–18, 21–11	(gold) Winner
2012	Swiss Open	(Thailand) Sudket Prapakamol	(Indonesia) Tontowi Ahmad (Indonesia) Liliyana Natsir	16–21, 14–21	(silver) Runner-up
2012	Thailand Open	(Thailand) Sudket Prapakamol	(China) Tao Jiaming (China) Tang Jinhua	14–21, 16–21	(silver) Runner-up
2015	Dutch Open	(Thailand) Sudket Prapakamol	(France) Ronan Labar (France) Emilie Lefel	10–21, 18–21	(silver) Runner-up

BWF Grand Prix Gold tournament
BWF Grand Prix tournament

=== IBF International ===
Mixed doubles
Year	Tournament	Partner	Opponent	Score	Result
1998	Thailand Satellite	(Thailand) Tesana Panvisvas	(China) Chen Tao (China) Liang Liyi	15–3, 15–7	(gold) Winner
