= Hu Ting =

Chinese badminton player

Hu Ting 胡婷
Personal information
- Born: 12 February 1981 (age 45) Hubei, China
- Height: 1.63 m (5 ft 4 in)

Sport
- Country: China
- Sport: Badminton
- Handedness: Right
- Event: Women's singles

Women's singles
- BWF profile
Medal record
Women's badminton
Representing China
World Junior Championships
| Silver medal – second place | 1998 Melbourne | Girls' singles |
Asian Junior Championships
| Gold medal – first place | 1999 Yangon | Girls' singles |
| Gold medal – first place | 1999 Yangon | Girls' team |
| Gold medal – first place | 1998 Kuala Lumpur | Girls' singles |
| Gold medal – first place | 1998 Kuala Lumpur | Girls' team |

Hu Ting (Chinese: 胡婷, born 12 February 1981) is a former Chinese badminton player. Born in Hubei, Hu was joined the provincial team in 1994. She then selected to join the national junior team in 1997, after that in the senior team in 1998. Hu was two times Asian Junior Champion in 1998 and 1999, also the runner-up in 1998 World Junior Championships. She won the senior title at the 2002 Malaysia Open, defeating the World No.1 women's singles player Camilla Martin.

== Achievements ==
=== World Junior Championships ===
Girls' singles
| Year | Venue | Opponent | Score | Result |
|---|---|---|---|---|
| 1998 | Sports and Aquatic Centre; Melbourne, Australia | (China) Gong Ruina | 11–3, 10–13, 7–11 | Silver |

=== Asian Junior Championships ===
Girls' singles
| Year | Venue | Opponent | Score | Result |
|---|---|---|---|---|
| 1999 | National Indoor Stadium – 1 Yangon, Myanmar | (China) Wei Yan | 2–11, 13–11, 11–7 | Gold |
| 1998 | Kuala Lumpur Badminton Stadium; Kuala Lumpur, Malaysia | (China) Gong Ruina | 11–6, 11–2 | Gold |

=== IBF World Grand Prix ===
The World Badminton Grand Prix sanctioned by International Badminton Federation (IBF) since 1983.

Women's singles
| Year | Tournament | Opponent | Score | Result |
|---|---|---|---|---|
| 2002 | Malaysia Open | (Denmark) Camilla Martin | 11–8, 11–6 | (gold) Winner |
| 2000 | German Open | (China) Dong Fang | 6–11, 3–11 | (silver) Runner-up |
