= Xie Zhongbo =

Chinese badminton player (born 1983)

Xie Zhongbo 谢中博
Personal information
- Born: 22 May 1983 (age 43) Hunan, China
- Height: 1.88 m (6 ft 2 in)
- Weight: 86 kg (190 lb)

Sport
- Country: China
- Sport: Badminton
- Handedness: Right
- Retired: January 2010
- Event: Men's & mixed doubles

Men's & mixed doubles
- BWF profile
Medal record
Men's badminton
Representing China
World Championships
| Silver medal – second place | 2005 Anaheim | Mixed doubles |
| Bronze medal – third place | 2007 Kuala Lumpur | Mixed doubles |
World Cup
| Gold medal – first place | 2005 Yiyang | Mixed doubles |
| Silver medal – second place | 2006 Yiyang | Mixed doubles |
| Bronze medal – third place | 2006 Yiyang | Men's doubles |
Thomas Cup
| Gold medal – first place | 2006 Sendai & Tokyo | Men's team |
| Gold medal – first place | 2008 Jakarta | Men's team |
Asian Games
| Gold medal – first place | 2006 Doha | Men's team |
| Silver medal – second place | 2006 Doha | Mixed doubles |
Asian Championships
| Bronze medal – third place | 2004 Kuala Lumpur | Mixed doubles |
World Junior Championships
| Gold medal – first place | 2000 Guangzhou | Mixed team |
| Silver medal – second place | 2000 Guangzhou | Boys' doubles |
Asian Junior Championships
| Gold medal – first place | 2000 Kyoto | Boys' team |
| Silver medal – second place | 1999 Yangon | Boys' team |
| Bronze medal – third place | 1999 Yangon | Boys' doubles |
| Bronze medal – third place | 1999 Yangon | Mixed doubles |
| Bronze medal – third place | 2000 Kyoto | Boys' doubles |

Xie Zhongbo (Chinese: 谢中博; born 22 May 1983) is a former Chinese badminton player from Hunan and raised in Sichuan. After retiring from the international tournament, he works as badminton coach in Sichuan.

== Career ==
A doubles specialist on the world circuit, Xie has regularly partnered Guo Zhendong in men's doubles and Zhang Yawen in mixed doubles during his career. Xie and Guo have won the Polish International (2004), the China Masters (2005), and the India Open (2008) together. They were quarter-finalists at the 2007 BWF World Championships, and at the 2008 Beijing Olympics narrowly lost to the eventual gold medalists, Indonesia's Markis Kido and Hendra Setiawan, in the round of sixteen.

Xie has had greater success in mixed doubles. He and Zhang have captured eight titles internationally since the beginning of 2005. They were silver medalists at the 2005 IBF World Championships, losing the gold to Indonesia's Nova Widianto and Lilyana Natsir, and were bronze medalists at the 2007 edition of the tournament.

Xie was a member of China's world champion Thomas Cup (men's international) team. At 1.88 meters and solidly built, he was one of the tallest and most physically players on the world circuit.

He retired from competitive international badminton in January 2010.

== Achievements ==
=== BWF World Championships ===
Mixed doubles
| Year | Venue | Partner | Opponent | Score | Result |
|---|---|---|---|---|---|
| 2005 | Arrowhead Pond, Anaheim, United States | (China) Zhang Yawen | (Indonesia) Nova Widianto (Indonesia) Lilyana Natsir | 15–13, 8–15, 2–15 | Silver |
| 2007 | Putra Indoor Stadium, Kuala Lumpur, Malaysia | (China) Zhang Yawen | (Indonesia) Nova Widianto (Indonesia) Lilyana Natsir | 15–21, 21–15, 20–22 | Bronze |

=== World Cup ===
Men's doubles
| Year | Venue | Partner | Opponent | Score | Result |
|---|---|---|---|---|---|
| 2006 | Olympic Park, Yiyang, China | (China) Guo Zhendong | (Indonesia) Markis Kido (Indonesia) Hendra Setiawan | 19–21, 13–21 | Bronze |

Mixed doubles
| Year | Venue | Partner | Opponent | Score | Result |
|---|---|---|---|---|---|
| 2005 | Olympic Park, Yiyang, China | (China) Zhang Yawen | (Indonesia) Nova Widianto (Indonesia) Liliyana Natsir | 21–19, 21–10 | Gold |
| 2006 | Olympic Park, Yiyang, China | (China) Zhang Yawen | (Indonesia) Nova Widianto (Indonesia) Liliyana Natsir | 16–21, 18–21 | Silver |

=== Asian Games ===
Mixed doubles
| Year | Venue | Partner | Opponent | Score | Result |
|---|---|---|---|---|---|
| 2006 | Aspire Hall 3, Doha, Qatar | (China) Zhang Yawen | (China) Zheng Bo (China) Gao Ling | 16–21, 23–25 | Silver |

=== Asian Championships ===
Mixed doubles
| Year | Venue | Partner | Opponent | Score | Result |
|---|---|---|---|---|---|
| 2004 | Kuala Lumpur Badminton Stadium, Kuala Lumpur, Malaysia | (China) Yu Yang | (Thailand) Sudket Prapakamol (Thailand) Saralee Thungthongkam | 3–15, 11–15 | Bronze |

=== World Junior Championships ===
Boys' doubles
| Year | Venue | Partner | Opponent | Score | Result |
|---|---|---|---|---|---|
| 2000 | Tianhe Gymnasium, Guangzhou, China | (China) Cao Chen | (China) Sang Yang (China) Zheng Bo | 5–7, 5–7, 7–2, 5–7 | Silver |

=== Asian Junior Championships ===
Boys' doubles
| Year | Venue | Partner | Opponent | Score | Result |
|---|---|---|---|---|---|
| 1999 | National Indoor Stadium – 1, Yangon, Myanmar | (China) Zhang Weihong | (Indonesia) Hendri Kurniawan Saputra (Indonesia) Wandri Kurniawan Saputra | 16–17, 8–15 | Bronze |
| 2000 | Nishiyama Park Gymnasium, Kyoto, Japan | (China) Cao Chen | (South Korea) Lee Jae-jin (South Korea) Jung Jae-sung | 1–15, 16–17 | Bronze |

Mixed doubles
| Year | Venue | Partner | Opponent | Score | Result |
|---|---|---|---|---|---|
| 1999 | National Indoor Stadium – 1, Yangon, Myanmar | (China) Zhang Jiewen | (Indonesia) Hendri Kurniawan Saputra (Indonesia) Enny Erlangga | 14–17, 12–15 | Bronze |

=== BWF Superseries ===
The BWF Superseries, launched on 14 December 2006 and implemented in 2007, is a series of elite badminton tournaments, sanctioned by Badminton World Federation (BWF). BWF Superseries has two level such as Superseries and Superseries Premier. A season of Superseries features twelve tournaments around the world, which introduced since 2011, with successful players invited to the Superseries Finals held at the year end.

Men's doubles
| Year | Tournament | Partner | Opponent | Score | Result |
|---|---|---|---|---|---|
| 2007 | China Open | (China) Guo Zhendong | (Indonesia) Markis Kido (Indonesia) Hendra Setiawan | 12–21, 19–21 | (silver) Runner-up |

Mixed doubles
| Year | Tournament | Partner | Opponent | Score | Result |
|---|---|---|---|---|---|
| 2007 | French Open | (China) Zhang Yawen | (Indonesia) Flandy Limpele (Indonesia) Vita Marissa | 11–21, 15–21 | (silver) Runner-up |
| 2008 | China Masters | (China) Zhang Yawen | (Indonesia) Nova Widianto (Indonesia) Liliyana Natsir | 21–17, 21–17 | (gold) Winner |
| 2008 | Hong Kong Open | (China) Zhang Yawen | (South Korea) Lee Yong-dae (South Korea) Lee Hyo-jung | 21–14, 21–16 | (gold) Winner |
| 2009 | Singapore Open | (China) Zhang Yawen | (China) Zheng Bo (China) Ma Jin | 21–19, 19–21, 11–21 | (silver) Runner-up |
| 2009 | China Masters | (China) Zhang Yawen | (China) Tao Jiaming (China) Wang Xiaoli | 21–13, 19–21, 4–8 Retired | (silver) Runner-up |

BWF Super Series Finals tournament
BWF Super Series Premier tournament
BWF Super Series tournament

=== BWF Grand Prix ===
The BWF Grand Prix has two levels, the Grand Prix Gold and Grand Prix. It is a series of badminton tournaments, sanctioned by the Badminton World Federation (BWF) since 2007. The World Badminton Grand Prix has been sanctioned by the International Badminton Federation since 1983.

Men's doubles
| Year | Tournament | Partner | Opponent | Score | Result |
|---|---|---|---|---|---|
| 2005 | China Masters | (China) Guo Zhendong | (Malaysia) Choong Tan Fook (Malaysia) Lee Wan Wah | 15–10, 15–4 | (gold) Winner |
| 2007 | Philippines Open | (China) Guo Zhendong | (Malaysia) Koo Kien Keat (Malaysia) Tan Boon Heong | 8–21, 24–26 | (silver) Runner-up |
| 2008 | India Open | (China) Guo Zhendong | (Malaysia) Chan Chong Ming (Malaysia) Chew Choon Eng | 19–21, 21–14, 21–12 | (gold) Winner |
| 2008 | Thailand Open | (China) Guo Zhendong | (China) Cai Yun (China) Fu Haifeng | 17–21, Retired | (silver) Runner-up |

Mixed doubles
| Year | Tournament | Partner | Opponent | Score | Result |
|---|---|---|---|---|---|
| 2005 | Hong Kong Open | (China) Zhang Yawen | (England) Nathan Robertson (England) Gail Emms | 15–8, 15–5 | (gold) Winner |
| 2006 | German Open | (China) Zhang Yawen | (China) Zhang Jun (China) Gao Ling | 11–15, 12–15 | (silver) Runner-up |
| 2006 | China Masters | (China) Zhang Yawen | (China) Zhang Jun (China) Gao Ling | 21–16, 10–21, 22–20 | (gold) Winner |
| 2006 | Indonesia Open | (China) Zhang Yawen | (Indonesia) Nova Widianto (Indonesia) Liliyana Natsir | 21–19, 21–15 | (gold) Winner |
| 2006 | China Open | (China) Zhang Yawen | (China) Xu Chen (China) Zhao Tingting | 21–19, 21–5 | (gold) Winner |
| 2007 | Macau Open | (China) Zhang Yawen | (Chinese Taipei) Fang Chieh-min (Chinese Taipei) Cheng Wen-hsing | 21–14, 21–16 | (gold) Winner |
| 2008 | Thailand Open | (China) Zhang Yawen | (China) He Hanbin (China) Yu Yang | 23–25, 21–10, 23–21 | (gold) Winner |

BWF Grand Prix Gold tournament
BWF Grand Prix tournament

=== IBF International ===
Men's doubles
| Year | Tournament | Partner | Opponent | Score | Result |
|---|---|---|---|---|---|
| 2004 | Polish International | (China) Guo Zhendong | (Poland) Michał Łogosz (Poland) Robert Mateusiak | 8–15, 17–14, 17–14 | (gold) Winner |

Mixed doubles
| Year | Tournament | Partner | Opponent | Score | Result |
|---|---|---|---|---|---|
| 2004 | French International | (China) Yu Yang | (Russia) Nikolai Zuyev (Russia) Marina Yakusheva | 17–16, 15–9 | (gold) Winner |
