= Zhang Yawen =

Chinese badminton player (born 1985)

Zhang Yawen 张亚雯
Personal information
- Born: 9 March 1983 (age 43) Chongqing, China
- Height: 1.62 m (5 ft 4 in)
- Weight: 58 kg (128 lb)

Sport
- Country: China
- Sport: Badminton
- Handedness: Right

Women's & mixed doubles
- Highest ranking: 3 (WD with Zhang Dan December 2005); 1 (WD with Wei Yili August 2007); 1 (WD with Zhao Tingting 8 October 2009); 1 (XD with Xie Zhongbo June 2006)
- BWF profile
Medal record
Women's badminton
Representing China
Olympic Games
Bronze medal – third place	2008 Beijing	Women's doubles
World Championships
Gold medal – first place	2009 Hyderabad	Women's doubles
Silver medal – second place	2005 Anaheim	Mixed doubles
Silver medal – second place	2006 Madrid	Women's doubles
Bronze medal – third place	2005 Anaheim	Women's doubles
Bronze medal – third place	2007 Kuala Lumpur	Women's doubles
Bronze medal – third place	2007 Kuala Lumpur	Mixed doubles
World Cup
Gold medal – first place	2005 Yiyang	Mixed doubles
Silver medal – second place	2005 Yiyang	Women's doubles
Silver medal – second place	2006 Yiyang	Mixed doubles
Sudirman Cup
Gold medal – first place	2007 Glasgow	Mixed team
Gold medal – first place	2009 Guangzhou	Mixed team
Uber Cup
Gold medal – first place	2008 Jakarta	Women's team
Asian Games
Gold medal – first place	2006 Doha	Women's team
Silver medal – second place	2006 Doha	Mixed doubles
Asian Championships
Bronze medal – third place	2001 Manila	Women's doubles
East Asian Games
Gold medal – first place	2009 Hong Kong	Mixed doubles
Gold medal – first place	2009 Hong Kong	Women's team
World Junior Championships
Gold medal – first place	2000 Guangzhou	Girls' doubles
Gold medal – first place	2000 Guangzhou	Mixed doubles
Gold medal – first place	2000 Guangzhou	Mixed team
Asian Junior Championships
Gold medal – first place	1999 Yangon	Girls' team
Gold medal – first place	2000 Kyoto	Girls' doubles
Gold medal – first place	2000 Kyoto	Girls' team
Silver medal – second place	2000 Kyoto	Mixed doubles
Bronze medal – third place	1999 Yangon	Girls' singles
Bronze medal – third place	1999 Yangon	Girls' doubles

Zhang Yawen (simplified Chinese: 张亚雯; traditional Chinese: 張亞雯; pinyin: Zhāng Yàwén; born 9 March 1983) is a Chinese badminton player.

== Career ==
Zhang has specialized in women's doubles and mixed doubles, earning numerous international titles in both events. At various times she has partnered either Zhang Dan, or Zhao Tingting, or Wei Yili to women's doubles victories at the French (2002, 2007), German (2004), Thailand (2004), Singapore (2005, 2007), Indonesia (2006), China (2008), and Hong Kong (2008) Opens. Prior to 2009 her biggest triumph came with Wei Yili at the prestigious All-England Championships in 2007 where they defeated compatriots Gao Ling and Huang Sui, and Yang Wei and Zhang Jiewen, the two dominant teams of the era, respectively in the semifinals and finals. All of her mixed doubles titles have been earned in partnership with Xie Zhongbo and they include the Badminton World Cup (2005), the China Masters (2006, 2008), and the Hong Kong (2005, 2008), Indonesia (2006), Macau (2007), and Thailand (2008) Opens.

Before 2009 Zhang had earned five medals, without yet "striking gold", at the BWF World Championships. At the 2005 tournament she took a bronze in women's doubles with Zhang Dan, and a silver with Xie Zhongbo in mixed doubles behind Indonesia's Nova Widianto and Liliyana Natsir. At the 2006 tournament Zhang and Wei Yili upset Yang Wei and Zhang Jiewen in the semi-finals but were beaten in the final by Gao Ling and Huang Sui. Zhang was eliminated in the semi-finals of both doubles events at the 2007 edition in Kuala Lumpur.

At the 2008 Beijing Olympics Zhang and Wei Yili were ousted from women's doubles gold medal contention in the semi-finals by the eventual champions, compatriots Du Jing and Yu Yang. In the playoff for third place they salvaged a bronze medal by defeating Japan's Miyuki Maeda and Satoko Suetsuna.

2009 proved to be Zhang's most successful season. With Zhao Tingting she captured women's doubles titles at the two most prestigious events for individual players outside of the Olympics, the All-England Championships and the BWF World Championships, defeating compatriots Cheng Shu and Zhao Yunlei in the final of each.

== Achievements ==
=== Olympic Games ===
Women's doubles
Year	Venue	Partner	Opponent	Score	Result
2008	Beijing University of Technology Gymnasium, Beijing, China	(China) Wei Yili	(Japan) Miyuki Maeda (Japan) Satoko Suetsuna	21–17, 21–10	Bronze

=== BWF World Championships ===
Women's doubles
Year	Venue	Partner	Opponent	Score	Result
2005	Arrowhead Pond, Anaheim, United States	(China) Zhang Dan	(China) Gao Ling (China) Huang Sui	5–15, 8–15	Bronze
2006	Palacio de Deportes de la Comunidad, Madrid, Spain	(China) Wei Yili	(China) Gao Ling (China) Huang Sui	21–23, 9–21	Silver
2007	Putra Indoor Stadium, Kuala Lumpur, Malaysia	(China) Wei Yili	(China) Yang Wei (China) Zhang Jiewen	21–19, 18–21, 16–21	Bronze
2009	Gachibowli Indoor Stadium, Hyderabad, India	(China) Zhao Tingting	(China) Cheng Shu (China) Zhao Yunlei	17–21, 21–17, 21–16	Gold

Mixed doubles
Year	Venue	Partner	Opponent	Score	Result
2005	Arrowhead Pond, Anaheim, United States	(China) Xie Zhongbo	(Indonesia) Nova Widianto (Indonesia) Liliyana Natsir	15–13, 8–15, 2–15	Silver
2007	Putra Indoor Stadium, Kuala Lumpur, Malaysia	(China) Xie Zhongbo	(Indonesia) Nova Widianto (Indonesia) Liliyana Natsir	15–21, 21–15, 20–22	Bronze

=== World Cup ===
Women's doubles
Year	Venue	Partner	Opponent	Score	Result
2005	Olympic Park, Yiyang, China	(China) Wei Yili	(China) Yang Wei (China) Zhang Jiewen	18–21, 15–21	Silver

Mixed doubles
Year	Venue	Partner	Opponent	Score	Result
2005	Olympic Park, Yiyang, China	(China) Xie Zhongbo	(Indonesia) Nova Widianto (Indonesia) Liliyana Natsir	21–19, 21–10	Gold
2006	Olympic Park, Yiyang, China	(China) Xie Zhongbo	(Indonesia) Nova Widianto (Indonesia) Liliyana Natsir	16–21, 18–21	Silver

=== Asian Games ===
Mixed doubles
Year	Venue	Partner	Opponent	Score	Result
2006	Aspire Hall 3, Doha, Qatar	(China) Xie Zhongbo	(China) Zheng Bo (China) Gao Ling	16–21, 23–25	Silver

=== Asian Championships ===
Women's doubles
Year	Venue	Partner	Opponent	Score	Result
2001	PhilSports Arena, Manila, Philippines	(China) Zhao Tingting	(Indonesia) Deyana Lomban (Indonesia) Vita Marissa	12–15, 15–11, 12–15	Bronze

=== East Asian Games ===
Mixed doubles
Year	Venue	Partner	Opponent	Score	Result
2009	Queen Elizabeth Stadium, Hong Kong	(China) Tao Jiaming	(China) Zhang Nan (China) Ma Jin	21–15, 21–14	Gold

=== World Junior Championships ===
Girls' doubles
Year	Venue	Partner	Opponent	Score	Result
2000	Tianhe Gymnasium, Guangzhou, China	(China) Wei Yili	(China) Li Yujia (China) Zhao Tingting	4–7, 7–2, 7–0, 7–1	Gold

Mixed doubles
Year	Venue	Partner	Opponent	Score	Result
2000	Tianhe Gymnasium, Guangzhou, China	(China) Sang Yang	(China) Zheng Bo (China) Wei Yili	7–3, 7–0, 8–6	Gold

=== Asian Junior Championships ===
Girls' singles
Year	Venue	Opponent	Score	Result
1999	National Indoor Stadium – 1, Yangon, Myanmar	(China) Wei Yan	4–11, 1–11	Bronze

Girls' doubles
Year	Venue	Partner	Opponent	Score	Result
1999	National Indoor Stadium – 1, Yangon, Myanmar	(China) Zhao Tingting	(China) Li Yujia (China) Wei Yili	7–15, 10–15	Bronze
2000	Nishiyama Park Gymnasium, Kyoto, Japan	(China) Wei Yili	(China) Li Yujia (China) Zhao Tingting	15–12, 15–5	Gold

Mixed doubles
Year	Venue	Partner	Opponent	Score	Result
2000	Nishiyama Park Gymnasium, Kyoto, Japan	(China) Sang Yang	(China) Zheng Bo (China) Wei Yili	Walkover	Silver

=== BWF Superseries ===
The BWF Superseries, which was launched on 14 December 2006 and implemented in 2007, is a series of elite badminton tournaments, sanctioned by the Badminton World Federation (BWF). BWF Superseries levels are Superseries and Superseries Premier. A season of Superseries consists of twelve tournaments around the world that have been introduced since 2011. Successful players are invited to the Superseries Finals, which are held at the end of each year.

Women's doubles
Year	Tournament	Partner	Opponent	Score	Result
2007	All England Open	(China) Wei Yili	(China) Yang Wei (China) Zhang Jiewen	21–16, 8–21, 24–22	(gold) Winner
2007	Singapore Open	(China) Wei Yili	(China) Yang Wei (China) Zhao Tingting	10–21, 21–19, 21–18	(gold) Winner
2007	French Open	(China) Wei Yili	(China) Yu Yang (China) Zhao Tingting	21–10, 21–15	(gold) Winner
2007	Hong Kong Open	(China) Wei Yili	(China) Du Jing (China) Yu Yang	20–22, 21–13, 17–21	(silver) Runner-up
2008	Swiss Open	(China) Wei Yili	(China) Yang Wei (China) Zhang Jiewen	18–21, 24–22, 8–21	(silver) Runner-up
2008	China Open	(China) Zhao Tingting	(Malaysia) Chin Eei Hui (Malaysia) Wong Pei Tty	21–14, 21–19	(gold) Winner
2008	Hong Kong Open	(China) Zhao Tingting	(China) Cheng Shu (China) Zhao Yunlei	21–14, 21–13	(gold) Winner
2009	All England Open	(China) Zhao Tingting	(China) Cheng Shu (China) Zhao Yunlei	21–13, 21–15	(gold) Winner
2009	Singapore Open	(China) Zhao Tingting	(Indonesia) Nitya Krishinda Maheswari (Indonesia) Greysia Polii	21–14, 21–13	(gold) Winner
2009	Denmark Open	(China) Pan Pan	(Denmark) Lena Frier Kristiansen (Denmark) Kamilla Rytter Juhl	22–20, 18–21, 21–12	(gold) Winner
2009	China Open	(China) Tian Qing	(China) Du Jing (China) Yu Yang	21–14, 21–14	(gold) Winner

Mixed doubles
Year	Tournament	Partner	Opponent	Score	Result
2007	French Open	(China) Xie Zhongbo	(Indonesia) Flandy Limpele (Indonesia) Vita Marissa	11–21, 15–21	(silver) Runner-up
2008	China Masters	(China) Xie Zhongbo	(Indonesia) Nova Widianto (Indonesia) Liliyana Natsir	21–17, 21–17	(gold) Winner
2008	Hong Kong Open	(China) Xie Zhongbo	(South Korea) Lee Yong-dae (South Korea) Lee Hyo-jung	21–14, 21–16	(gold) Winner
2009	Singapore Open	(China) Xie Zhongbo	(China) Zheng Bo (China) Ma Jin	21–19, 19–21, 11–21	(silver) Runner-up
2009	China Masters	(China) Xie Zhongbo	(China) Tao Jiaming (China) Wang Xiaoli	21–13, 19–21, 4–8 retired	(silver) Runner-up
2010	Korea Open	(China) Tao Jiaming	(China) He Hanbin (China) Yu Yang	15–21, 16–21	(silver) Runner-up
2010	Malaysia Open	(China) Tao Jiaming	(Denmark) Thomas Laybourn (Denmark) Kamilla Rytter Juhl	19–21, 21–18, 21–15	(gold) Winner

BWF Super Series Finals tournament
BWF Super Series Premier tournament
BWF Super Series tournament

=== BWF Grand Prix ===
The BWF Grand Prix had two levels, the BWF Grand Prix and Grand Prix Gold. It was a series of badminton tournaments sanctioned by the Badminton World Federation (BWF) which was held from 2007 to 2017. The World Badminton Grand Prix has been sanctioned by the International Badminton Federation from 1983 to 2006.

Women's doubles
Year	Tournament	Partner	Opponent	Score	Result
2001	Singapore Open	(China) Zhao Tingting	(China) Wei Yili (China) Zhang Jiewen	6–8, 3–7, 4–7	(silver) Runner-up
2002	Malaysia Open	(China) Zhao Tingting	(China) Huang Nanyan (China) Yang Wei	5–11, 5–11	(silver) Runner-up
2003	Denmark Open	(China) Zhang Dan	(China) Yang Wei (China) Zhang Jiewen	2–15, 1–15	(silver) Runner-up
2004	Thailand Open	(China) Zhang Dan	(China) Du Jing (China) Yu Yang	15–5, 15–7	(gold) Winner
2004	Denmark Open	(China) Zhang Dan	(China) Wei Yili (China) Zhao Tingting	13–15, 15–12, 7–15	(silver) Runner-up
2004	German Open	(China) Zhang Dan	(China) Wei Yili (China) Zhao Tingting	15–8, 15–12	(gold) Winner
2004	Indonesia Open	(China) Zhang Dan	(China) Yang Wei (China) Zhang Jiewen	10–15, 5–15	(silver) Runner-up
2005	Thailand Open	(China) Zhang Dan	(South Korea) Lee Hyo-jung (South Korea) Lee Kyung-won	15–9, 11–15, 13–15	(silver) Runner-up
2005	Singapore Open	(China) Zhang Dan	(China) Gao Ling (China) Huang Sui	15–13, 15–10	(gold) Winner
2006	China Masters	(China) Wei Yili	(China) Gao Ling (China) Huang Sui	12–21, 21–18, 14–21	(silver) Runner-up
2006	Indonesia Open	(China) Wei Yili	(China) Yang Wei (China) Zhang Jiewen	21–13, 21–13	(gold) Winner
2006	Japan Open	(China) Wei Yili	(China) Gao Ling (China) Huang Sui	15–21, 17–21	(silver) Runner-up
2006	China Open	(China) Wei Yili	(China) Yang Wei (China) Zhang Jiewen	17–21, 7–21	(silver) Runner-up

Mixed doubles
Year	Tournament	Partner	Opponent	Score	Result
2002	Malaysia Open	(China) Wang Wei	(England) Nathan Robertson (England) Gail Emms	9–11, 4–11	(silver) Runner-up
2005	Hong Kong Open	(China) Xie Zhongbo	(England) Nathan Robertson (England) Gail Emms	15–8, 15–5	(gold) Winner
2006	German Open	(China) Xie Zhongbo	(China) Zhang Jun (China) Gao Ling	11–15, 12–15	(silver) Runner-up
2006	China Masters	(China) Xie Zhongbo	(China) Zhang Jun (China) Gao Ling	21–16, 10–21, 22–20	(gold) Winner
2006	Indonesia Open	(China) Xie Zhongbo	(Indonesia) Nova Widianto (Indonesia) Liliyana Natsir	21–19, 21–15	(gold) Winner
2006	China Open	(China) Xie Zhongbo	(China) Xu Chen (China) Zhao Tingting	21–19, 21–5	(gold) Winner
2007	Macau Open	(China) Xie Zhongbo	(Chinese Taipei) Fang Chieh-min (Chinese Taipei) Cheng Wen-hsing	21–14, 21–16	(gold) Winner
2008	Thailand Open	(China) Xie Zhongbo	(China) He Hanbin (China) Yu Yang	23–25, 21–10, 23–21	(gold) Winner

BWF Grand Prix Gold tournament
BWF Grand Prix tournament

=== IBF International ===
Women's doubles
Year	Tournament	Partner	Opponent	Score	Result
2001	China Satellite	(China) Chen Xiaoli	(China) Han Jie (China) Long Ying	15–1, 15–10	(gold) Winner
2002	French International	(China) Zhao Tingting	(China) Wei Yili (China) Zhang Jiewen	1–7, 2–7, 7–5, 7–5, 7–2	(gold) Winner

Mixed doubles
Year	Tournament	Partner	Opponent	Score	Result
2002	French International	(China) Zheng Bo	(China) Sang Yang (China) Zhao Tingting	7–0, 7–4, 7–8, 3–7, 8–6	(gold) Winner
