= 2009 All England Super Series – Mixed doubles =

This article list the results of mixed doubles category in the 2009 All England Super Series.

== Seeds ==
1. (Indonesia) Nova Widianto and Lilyana Natsir
2. (South Korea) Lee Yong-dae and Lee Hyo-jung
3. (China) He Hanbin and Yu Yang
4. (England) Anthony Clark and Donna Kellogg
5. (Denmark) Thomas Laybourn and Kamilla Rytter Juhl
6. (Denmark) Joachim Fischer Nielsen and Christinna Pedersen
7. (England) Robert Blair and (Scotland) Imogen Bankier
8. (Thailand) Sudket Prapakamol and Saralee Thoungthongkam

== Draws ==
=== Finals ===
Semifinals
(Indonesia) Flandy Limpele (Russia) Anastasia Russkikh	12	14
3	(China) He Hanbin (China) Yu Yang	21	21
Q	(South Korea) Ko Sung-hyun (South Korea) Ha Jung-eun	20	24	21
(China) Zheng Bo (China) Ma Jin	22	22	12

Final
3	(China) He Hanbin (China) Yu Yang	13	21	21
Q	(South Korea) Ko Sung-hyun (South Korea) Ha Jung-eun	21	15	9

=== Top Half ===
First Round
1	(Indonesia) Nova Widianto (Indonesia) Lilyana Natsir	21	21
(Chinese Taipei) Hsieh Yu-Hsin (Chinese Taipei) Chien Yu Chin	9	15
(France) Baptiste Careme (France) Laura Choinet	16	15
(Thailand) Songphon Anugritayawon (Thailand) Kunchala Voravichitchaikul	21	21
7	(England) Robert Blair (Scotland) Imogen Bankier	19	21	21
(England) David Lindley (England) Suzanne Rayappan	21	19	15
(Indonesia) Flandy Limpele (Russia) Anastasia Russkikh	16	21	21
(China) Xie Zhongbo (China) Zhang Yawen	21	18	17
3	(China) He Hanbin (China) Yu Yang	21	21
(Bulgaria) Stilian Makarski (Bulgaria) Diana Dimova	16	14
(Denmark) Mikkel Delbo Larsen (Denmark) Mie Schjött-Kristensen	10
(Poland) Robert Mateusiak (Poland) Nadieżda Kostiuczyk Ret.	11
PFQ	(Singapore) Chayut Triyachart (Singapore) Shinta Mulia Sari	21	16	15
(Denmark) Rasmus Bonde (Denmark) Helle Nielsen	11	21	21
(Malaysia) Koo Kien Keat (Malaysia) Ng Hui Lin	21	14	11
(Indonesia) Devin Lahardi Fitriawan (Indonesia) Lita Nurlita	16	21	21

Second Round
1	(Indonesia) Nova Widianto (Indonesia) Lilyana Natsir	21	21
(Thailand) Songphon Anugritayawon (Thailand) Kunchala Voravichitchaikul	10	17
7	(England) Robert Blair (Scotland) Imogen Bankier	24	19
(Indonesia) Flandy Limpele (Russia) Anastasia Russkikh	26	21
3	(China) He Hanbin (China) Yu Yang	21	21
(Denmark) Mikkel Delbo Larsen (Denmark) Mie Schjött-Kristensen	12	13
(Denmark) Rasmus Bonde (Denmark) Helle Nielsen	17	20
(Indonesia) Devin Lahardi Fitriawan (Indonesia) Lita Nurlita	21	22

Quarterfinals
1	(Indonesia) Nova Widianto (Indonesia) Lilyana Natsir	13	23	16
(Indonesia) Flandy Limpele (Russia) Anastasia Russkikh	21	21	21
3	(China) He Hanbin (China) Yu Yang	21	21
(Indonesia) Devin Lahardi Fitriawan (Indonesia) Lita Nurlita	14	8

Semifinals
(Indonesia) Flandy Limpele (Russia) Anastasia Russkikh	12	14
3	(China) He Hanbin (China) Yu Yang	21	21

=== Bottom Half ===
First Round
Q	(England) Andrew Ellis (England) Sarah Bok Ret.
Q	(South Korea) Ko Sung-hyun (South Korea) Ha Jung-eun
(United States) Halim Haryanto Ho (United States) Peng Yun	18	14
8	(Thailand) Sudket Prapakamol (Thailand) Saralee Thoungthongkam	21	21
Q	(Malaysia) Mohd Razif Abdul Latif (Malaysia) Woon Khe Wei	14	25	16
(England) Chris Adcock (England) Gabrielle White	21	23	21
WDN	(England) Nathan Robertson (England) Jenny Wallwork Ret.
4	(England) Anthony Clark (England) Donna Kellogg
(China) Zheng Bo (China) Ma Jin	21	21
(China) Xu Chen (China) Zhao Yunlei	14	13
(South Korea) Han Sang-hoon (South Korea) Kim Min-jung	17	19
5	(Denmark) Thomas Laybourn (Denmark) Kamilla Rytter Juhl	21	21
(India) Diju Valiyaveetil (India) Jwala Gutta	16	21	21
Q	(Germany) Johannes Schöttler (Germany) Birgit Overzier	21	18	12
(Chinese Taipei) Fang Chieh-Min (Chinese Taipei) Cheng Wen-Hsing	12	21	18
2	(South Korea) Lee Yong-dae (South Korea) Lee Hyo-jung	21	15	21

Second Round
Q	(South Korea) Ko Sung-hyun (South Korea) Ha Jung-eun	21	21
8	(Thailand) Sudket Prapakamol (Thailand) Saralee Thoungthongkam	18	12
(England) Chris Adcock (England) Gabrielle White	14	16
4	(England) Anthony Clark (England) Donna Kellogg	21	21
(China) Zheng Bo (China) Ma Jin	16	21	21
5	(Denmark) Thomas Laybourn (Denmark) Kamilla Rytter Juhl	21	12	18
(India) Diju Valiyaveetil (India) Jwala Gutta	23	20	14
2	(South Korea) Lee Yong-dae (South Korea) Lee Hyo-jung	21	22	21

Quarterfinals
Q	(South Korea) Ko Sung-hyun (South Korea) Ha Jung-eun	21	15	21
4	(England) Anthony Clark (England) Donna Kellogg	16	21	11
(China) Zheng Bo (China) Ma Jin	13	21	21
2	(South Korea) Lee Yong-dae (South Korea) Lee Hyo-jung	21	18	18

Semifinals
Q	(South Korea) Ko Sung-hyun (South Korea) Ha Jung-eun	20	24	21
(China) Zheng Bo (China) Ma Jin	22	22	12

== Sources ==
Yonex All England Open Super Series 2009 - Mixed doubles
