= 2008 Badminton Asia Championships =

Badminton championships

Tournament information
- Location: Bandaraya Stadium, Johor Bahru, Malaysia
- Dates: April 15–April 20

The 2008 Badminton Asia Championships is the 27th tournament of the Badminton Asia Championships. It was held in Johor Bahru, Malaysia from April 15 to April 20, 2008.

== Medalists ==
Event	Gold	Silver	Bronze
Men's singles	(South Korea) Park Sung-hwan	(China) Chen Jin	(China) Lin Dan
Men's singles	(South Korea) Park Sung-hwan	(China) Chen Jin	(Indonesia) Sony Dwi Kuncoro
Women's singles	(China) Jiang Yanjiao	(China) Wang Lin	(Hong Kong) Wang Chen
Women's singles	(China) Jiang Yanjiao	(China) Wang Lin	(Hong Kong) Yip Pui Yin
Men's doubles	(South Korea) Jung Jae-sung (South Korea) Lee Yong-dae	(Indonesia) Candra Wijaya (Indonesia) Nova Widianto	(South Korea) Lee Jae-jin (South Korea) Hwang Ji-man
Men's doubles	(South Korea) Jung Jae-sung (South Korea) Lee Yong-dae	(Indonesia) Candra Wijaya (Indonesia) Nova Widianto	(Malaysia) Koo Kien Keat (Malaysia) Tan Boon Heong
Women's doubles	(China) Yang Wei (China) Zhang Jiewen	(Chinese Taipei) Cheng Wen-hsing (Chinese Taipei) Chien Yu-chin	(Indonesia) Lilyana Natsir (Indonesia) Vita Marissa
Women's doubles	(China) Yang Wei (China) Zhang Jiewen	(Chinese Taipei) Cheng Wen-hsing (Chinese Taipei) Chien Yu-chin	(South Korea) Lee Hyo-jung (South Korea) Lee Kyung-won
Mixed doubles	(Indonesia) Flandy Limpele (Indonesia) Vita Marissa	(Indonesia) Nova Widianto (Indonesia) Lilyana Natsir	(China) He Hanbin (China) Yu Yang
Mixed doubles	(Indonesia) Flandy Limpele (Indonesia) Vita Marissa	(Indonesia) Nova Widianto (Indonesia) Lilyana Natsir	(Chinese Taipei) Fang Chieh-min (Chinese Taipei) Cheng Wen-hsing

== Medal count ==
Pos	Country	Gold	Silver	Bronze	Total
1	China	2	2	2	6
2	South Korea	2	0	2	4
3	Indonesia	1	2	2	5
4	Chinese Taipei	0	1	1	2
5	Hong Kong	0	0	2	2
6	Malaysia	0	0	1	1

== Results ==
=== Finals ===
Category	Winners	Runners-up	Score
Men's singles	(South Korea) Park Sung-hwan	(China) Chen Jin	21-18, 21-18
Women's singles	(China) Jiang Yanjiao	(China) Wang Lin	18-21, 21–18, 21-13
Men's doubles	(South Korea) Jung Jae-sung (South Korea) Lee Yong-dae	(Indonesia) Candra Wijaya (Indonesia) Nova Widianto	21-16, 21-18
Women's doubles	(China) Yang Wei (China) Zhang Jiewen	(Chinese Taipei) Cheng Wen-hsing (Chinese Taipei) Chien Yu-chin	22–20, 21–16
Mixed doubles	(Indonesia) Flandy Limpele (Indonesia) Vita Marissa	(Indonesia) Nova Widianto (Indonesia) Lilyana Natsir	21-17, 21-17

=== Semi-finals ===
Category	Winner	Runner-up	Score
Men's singles	(China) Chen Jin	(China) Lin Dan	21–13, 21–14
Men's singles	(South Korea) Park Sung-hwan	(Indonesia) Sony Dwi Kuncoro	14–21, 21–16, 21–19
Women's singles	(China) Jiang Yanjiao	(Hong Kong) Wang Chen	21–17, 21–16
Women's singles	(China) Wang Lin	(Hong Kong) Yip Pui Yin	21–14, 21–18
Men's doubles	(Indonesia) Candra Wijaya (Indonesia) Nova Widianto	(South Korea) Hwang Ji-man (South Korea) Lee Jae-jin	21–15, 19–21, 21–17
Men's doubles	(South Korea) Jung Jae-sung (South Korea) Lee Yong-dae	(Malaysia) Koo Kien Keat (Malaysia) Tan Boon Heong	16–21, 21–16, 21–18
Women's doubles	(Chinese Taipei) Cheng Wen-hsing (Chinese Taipei) Chien Yu-chin	(South Korea) Lee Hyo-jung (South Korea) Lee Kyung-won	21–18, 21–5
Women's doubles	(China) Yang Wei (China) Zhang Jiewen	(Indonesia) Liliyana Natsir (Indonesia) Vita Marissa	21–10, 21–16
Mixed doubles	(Indonesia) Flandy Limpele (Indonesia) Vita Marissa	(Chinese Taipei) Fang Chieh-min (Chinese Taipei) Cheng Wen-hsing	21–17, 21–16
Mixed doubles	(Indonesia) Nova Widianto (Indonesia) Liliyana Natsir	(China) He Hanbin (China) Yu Yang	21–14, 21–17
