= 1995 Denmark Open =

The 1995 Denmark Open in badminton was held in Odense, from October 12 to October 15, 1995.

== Final results ==
Category	Winners	Runners-up	Score
Men's singles	(Denmark) Poul-Erik Høyer Larsen	(Indonesia) Hendrawan	17–18, 17–14, 17–16
Women's singles	(Sweden) Lim Xiaoqing	(Hong Kong) Wang Chen	11–6, 11–3
Men's doubles	(Denmark) Thomas Lund & Jon Holst-Christensen	(Indonesia) Rudy Wijaya & Tony Gunawan	16–17, 15–5, 15–6
Women's doubles	(Denmark) Lisbet Stuer-Lauridsen & Marlene Thomsen	(Denmark) Rikke Olsen & Helene Kirkegaard	15–11, 15–11
Mixed doubles	(China) Chen Xingdong & Peng Xinyong	(Indonesia) Flandy Limpele & Rosalina Riseu	3–15, 15–10, 15–12

Preceded by 1994 Denmark Open	Denmark Open	Succeeded by 1996 Denmark Open
