= 2007 BWF World Championships – Mixed doubles =

Mixed doubles at the 2007 BWF World Championships
- Venue: Putra Indoor Stadium
- Location: Kuala Lumpur, Malaysia
- Dates: August 13, 2007 – August 19, 2007

Medalists
gold medal	Nova Widianto; Liliyana Natsir	Indonesia
silver medal	Zheng Bo; Gao Ling	China
bronze medal	Flandy Limpele; Vita Marissa	Indonesia
bronze medal	Xie Zhongbo; Zhang Yawen	China

This article list the results of mixed doubles category in the 2007 BWF World Championships (World Badminton Championships).

== Seeds ==
1. (China) Zheng Bo / Gao Ling (final)
2. (Indonesia) Nova Widianto / Liliyana Natsir (world champions)
3. (China) Xie Zhongbo / Zhang Yawen (semi-finals)
4. (England) Nathan Robertson / Gail Emms (quarter-finals)
5. (England) Anthony Clark / Donna Kellogg (quarter-finals)
6. (Indonesia) Flandy Limpele / Vita Marissa (semi-finals)
7. (China) He Hanbin / Yu Yang (third round)
8. (Denmark) Thomas Laybourn / Kamilla Rytter Juhl (third round)
9. (South Korea) Han Sang-hoon / Hwang Yu-mi (quarter-finals)
10. (Poland) Robert Mateusiak / Nadieżda Kostiuczyk (quarter-finals)
11. (Denmark) Joachim Fischer Nielsen / Britta Andersen (first round)
12. (China) Xu Chen / Zhao Tingting (third round)
13. (Singapore) Hendri Saputra / Li Yujia (third round)
14. (Indonesia) Muhammad Rijal / Greysia Polii (third round)
15. (Germany) Ingo Kindervater / Kathrin Piotrowski (second round)
16. (Germany) Kristof Hopp / Birgit Overzier (first round)

Click on the seed number of a player to go to their draw section.

== Draw ==
=== Finals ===
Semi-finals
1	(China) Zheng Bo (China) Gao Ling	17	21	21
6	(Indonesia) Flandy Limpele (Indonesia) Vita Marissa	21	19	19
3	(China) Xie Zhongbo (China) Zhang Yawen	15	21	20
2	(Indonesia) Nova Widianto (Indonesia) Liliyana Natsir	21	15	22

Final
1	(China) Zheng Bo (China) Gao Ling	16	14
2	(Indonesia) Nova Widianto (Indonesia) Liliyana Natsir	21	21

=== Section 1 ===
First Round
15	(Germany) I Kindervater (Germany) K Piotrowski	21	21
(Hong Kong) Hui W H (Hong Kong) Chau H W	14	11
(Malaysia) Chan P S (Malaysia) Haw C H	21	21
(Belgium) W Claes (Belgium) N Descamps	18	7
(Japan) K Masuda (Japan) M Maeda	21	20	21
(Netherlands) R Bosch (Netherlands) P van Dooremalen	13	22	17
10	(Poland) R Mateusiak (Poland) N Kostiuczyk	21	21
(Canada) W Milroy (Canada) T Sun	12	12
(New Zealand) C Cooper (New Zealand) R Flavell	21	12	21
(Germany) T Dettmann (Germany) A Lillie	13	21	16

Second Round
1	(China) Zheng B (China) Gao L	21	21
(Russia) A Nikolaenko (Russia) N Vislova	15	18
(Germany) I Kindervater (Germany) K Piotrowski	21	17	20
(Malaysia) Chan P S (Malaysia) Haw C H	14	21	22
7	(China) He HB (China) Yu Y	21	21
(Japan) K Masuda (Japan) M Maeda	17	18
(Poland) R Mateusiak (Poland) N Kostiuczyk	21	21
(New Zealand) C Cooper (New Zealand) R Flavell	11	13

Third Round
1	(China) Zheng B (China) Gao L	21	21
(Malaysia) Chan P S (Malaysia) Haw C H	14	13
7	(China) He HB (China) Yu Y	21	17	13
(Poland) R Mateusiak (Poland) N Kostiuczyk	19	21	21

Quarter-finals
1	(China) Zheng B (China) Gao L	21	21
(Poland) R Mateusiak (Poland) N Kostiuczyk	16	17

=== Section 2 ===
First Round
11	(Denmark) J Fischer Nielsen (Denmark) B Andersen	13	20
(South Korea) Lee Y-d (South Korea) Lee H-j	21	22
(Slovenia) L Petrič (Slovenia) M Tvrdy	15	10
(Chinese Taipei) Chen H-l (Chinese Taipei) Chou C-c	21	21
(South Africa) D James (South Africa) M C Edwards	12	12
(England) R Middleton (England) L Parker	21	21
13	(Singapore) H Saputra (Singapore) Li YJ	21	21
(New Zealand) D Shirley (Malaysia) J Quay	9	14
(France) S Stoyanov (France) É Eymard	19	21	21
(Scotland) W Briggs (Scotland) I Bankier	21	19	16

Second Round
4	(England) N Robertson (England) G Emms	21	21
(United States) H Bach (United States) E Lee	15	13
(South Korea) Lee Y-d (South Korea) Lee H-j	21	21
(Chinese Taipei) Chen H-l (Chinese Taipei) Chou C-c	9	4
6	(Indonesia) F Limpele (Indonesia) V Marissa	21	19	21
(England) R Middleton (England) L Parker	11	21	15
13	(Singapore) H Saputra (Singapore) Li YJ	21	21
(France) S Stoyanov (France) É Eymard	18	9

Third Round
4	(England) N Robertson (England) G Emms	21	8	21
(South Korea) Lee Y-d (South Korea) Lee H-j	18	21	16
6	(Indonesia) F Limpele (Indonesia) V Marissa	14	21	21
13	(Singapore) H Saputra (Singapore) Li YJ	21	10	13

Quarter-finals
4	(England) N Robertson (England) G Emms	13	16
6	(Indonesia) F Limpele (Indonesia) V Marissa	21	21

=== Bottom half ===
==== Section 3 ====
First Round
(Seychelles) G Cupidon (Seychelles) J Ah-Wan	17	8
(Philippines) Kennevic Asuncion (Philippines) Kennie Asuncion	21	21
(Singapore) H Wijaya (Singapore) Jiang YM	21	21
16	(Germany) K Hopp (Germany) B Overzier	13	16
(Malaysia) Tan W K (Malaysia) Woon K W	18	21	21
(Canada) M Beres (Canada) V Loker	21	13	19
(Netherlands) J de Ruiter (Netherlands) I Vaessen	21	21
(Romania) A Milon (Romania) R Ciobotaru	14	12
(Ukraine) V Atrashchenkov (Ukraine) E Prus	9	10
12	(China) Xu C (China) Zhao TT	21	21

Second Round
(Philippines) Kennevic Asuncion (Philippines) Kennie Asuncion	21	10	12
(Singapore) H Wijaya (Singapore) Jiang YM	9	21	21
(Malaysia) Tan W K (Malaysia) Woon K W	11	15
5	(England) A Clark (England) Donna Kellogg	21	21
(Netherlands) J de Ruiter (Netherlands) I Vaessen	19	10
12	(China) Xu C (China) Zhao TT	21	21
(Bulgaria) K Dobrev (Bulgaria) M Dobreva	9	6
3	(China) Xie ZB (China) Zhang YW	21	21

Third Round
(Singapore) H Wijaya (Singapore) Jiang YM	18	21	15
5	(England) A Clark (England) Donna Kellogg	21	11	21
12	(China) Xu C (China) Zhao TT	21	22
(China) Xie ZB (China) Zhang YW	23	24

Quarter-finals
5	(England) A Clark (England) Donna Kellogg	13	10
3	(China) Xie Zhongbo (China) Zhang Yawen	21	21

==== Section 4 ====
First Round
(Slovenia) M Horvat (Slovenia) M Kersnik	15	17
(Hong Kong) Koon W C (Hong Kong) A T Putra	21	21
(Russia) V Durkin (Russia) V Sorokina	18	10
9	(South Korea) Han S-h (South Korea) Hwang Y-m	21	21
(England) D Lindley (England) S Rayappan	21	21
(Japan) T Ōtsuka (Japan) S Suetsuna	12	19
(United States) K Malaythong (United States) M Mangkalakiri	7	21	18
(Malaysia) Tan B S (Malaysia) Ooi Y H	21	16	21
(Italy) K Raffeiner (Italy) A Allegrin	8	8
14	(Indonesia) M Rijal (Indonesia) G Polii	21	21

Second Round
(Hong Kong) Koon W C (Hong Kong) A T Putra	11	17
9	(South Korea) Han S-h (South Korea) Hwang Y-m	21	21
(England) D Lindley (England) S Rayappan	18	11
8	(Denmark) T Laybourn (Denmark) K R Juhl	21	21
(Malaysia) Tan B S (Malaysia) Ooi Y H	11	13
14	(Indonesia) M Rijal (Indonesia) G Polii	21	21
(United States) N Jinadasa (United States) S Jinadasa	12	11
2	(Indonesia) N Widianto (Indonesia) L Natsir	21	21

Third Round
9	(South Korea) Han S-h (South Korea) Hwang Y-m	21	21
8	(Denmark) T Laybourn (Denmark) K R Juhl	12	10
14	(Indonesia) M Rijal (Indonesia) G Polii
2	(Indonesia) Nova Widianto (Indonesia) L Natsir	w	/	o

Quarter-finals
9	(South Korea) Han S-h (South Korea) Hwang Y-m	19	15
2	(Indonesia) N Widianto (Indonesia) L Natsir	21	21

== Sources ==
- Tournamentsoftware.com: 2007 World Championships - Mixed doubles
