= 2009 All England Super Series – Men's singles =

This article list the results of men's singles category in the 2009 All England Super Series.

== Seeds ==
1. (Malaysia) Lee Chong Wei
2. (China) Lin Dan
3. (China) Chen Jin
4. (Denmark) Peter Gade
5. (Indonesia) Sony Dwi Kuncoro
6. (Denmark) Joachim Persson
7. (Indonesia) Taufik Hidayat
8. (Poland) Przemysław Wacha

== Draws ==
=== Finals ===
Semifinals
1	(Malaysia) Lee Chong Wei	21	21
7	(Indonesia) Taufik Hidayat	8	13
3	(China) Chen Jin Ret.	12	6
2	(China) Lin Dan	21	11

Final
1	(Malaysia) Lee Chong Wei	19	12
2	(China) Lin Dan	21	21

=== Top Half ===
First Round
1	(Malaysia) Lee Chong Wei	19	21	21
(China) Lü Yi	21	16	11
(Germany) Marc Zwiebler	14	21	22
(Thailand) Boonsak Ponsana	21	15	20
5	(Indonesia) Sony Dwi Kuncoro	22	21
Q	(India) Anand Pawar	20	15
(Netherlands) Dicky Palyama	21	10	18
(Finland) Ville Lang	14	21	21
4	(Denmark) Peter Gade	21	21
(Indonesia) Simon Santoso	14	13
(Malaysia) Sairul Amar Ayob	20	15
(Hong Kong) Ng Wei	22	21
7	(Indonesia) Taufik Hidayat	21	15	21
(Chinese Taipei) Hsieh Yu-Hsing	19	21	14
(India) Chetan Anand	21	17	12
(England) Andrew Smith	6	21	21

Second Round
1	(Malaysia) Lee Chong Wei	21	21
(Germany) Marc Zwiebler	18	16
5	(Indonesia) Sony Dwi Kuncoro Ret.
(Finland) Ville Lang
4	(Denmark) Peter Gade	21	21
(Hong Kong) Ng Wei	11	16
7	(Indonesia) Taufik Hidayat	15	21	21
(England) Andrew Smith	21	15	16

Quarterfinals
1	(Malaysia) Lee Chong Wei	21	21
(Finland) Ville Lang	9	9
4	(Denmark) Peter Gade	17	18
7	(Indonesia) Taufik Hidayat	21	21

Semifinals
1	(Malaysia) Lee Chong Wei	21	21
7	(Indonesia) Taufik Hidayat	8	13

=== Bottom Half ===
First Round
Q	(France) Brice Leverdez	21	12	16
(Malaysia) Lee Tsuen Seng	10	21	21
(Japan) Sho Sasaki	21	22
8	(Poland) Przemysław Wacha	15	20
Q	(China) Gong Weijie	21	22
(India) Arvind Bhat	19	20
(Japan) Kenichi Tago	7	21	14
3	(China) Chen Jin	21	15	21
(Denmark) Jan Ø. Jørgensen	21	21
(Malaysia) Wong Choong Hann	13	15
(Hong Kong) Chan Yan Kit	16	9
6	(Denmark) Joachim Persson	21	21
(Netherlands) Eric Pang	17	19
(China) Bao Chunlai	21	21
(India) Anup Sridhar	13	14
2	(China) Lin Dan	21	21

Second Round
(Malaysia) Lee Tsuen Seng	11	12
(Japan) Sho Sasaki	21	21
Q	(China) Gong Weijie	10	10
3	(China) Chen Jin	21	21
(Denmark) Jan Ø. Jørgensen	15	18
6	(Denmark) Joachim Persson	21	21
(China) Bao Chunlai	14	13
2	(China) Lin Dan	21	21

Quarterfinals
(Japan) Sho Sasaki	21	13	19
3	(China) Chen Jin	14	21	21
6	(Denmark) Joachim Persson	13	6
2	(China) Lin Dan	21	21

Semifinals
3	(China) Chen Jin Ret.	12	6
2	(China) Lin Dan	21	11

== Sources ==
- Yonex All England Open Super Series 2009 - Men's singles
