= Flandy Limpele =

Indonesian badminton player (born 1974)

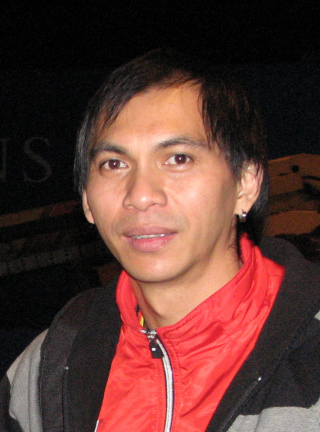

Personal information
- Born: Flandy Limpele; 9 February 1974 (age 52) Manado, North Sulawesi, Indonesia
- Height: 1.81 m (5 ft 11 1/2 in)
- Weight: 74 kg (163 lb; 11.7 st)

Sport
- Country: Indonesia (1992–2001, 2003–present); England (2001–2003)
- Sport: Badminton
- Handedness: Left
- Coached by: Richard Mainaky; Christian Hadinata; Herry Iman Pierngadi

Men's & mixed doubles
- Highest ranking: 1
- BWF profile
Medal record
Men's badminton
Representing Indonesia
Olympic Games
Bronze medal – third place	2004 Athens	Men's doubles
World Championships
Bronze medal – third place	2007 Kuala Lumpur	Mixed doubles
World Cup
Silver medal – second place	1996 Jakarta	Mixed doubles
Bronze medal – third place	1995 Jakarta	Mixed doubles
Bronze medal – third place	1997 Yogyakarta	Mixed doubles
World Senior Championships
Gold medal – first place	2015 Helsingborg	Men's doubles 35+
Sudirman Cup
Silver medal – second place	2001 Seville	Mixed team
Silver medal – second place	2005 Beijing	Mixed team
Silver medal – second place	2007 Glasgow	Mixed team
Bronze medal – third place	1997 Glasgow	Mixed team
Bronze medal – third place	1999 Copenhagen	Mixed team
Thomas Cup
Bronze medal – third place	2004 Jakarta	Men's team
Asian Championships
Gold medal – first place	2008 Johor Bahru	Mixed doubles
Bronze medal – third place	1996 Surabaya	Mixed doubles
Bronze medal – third place	1998 Bangkok	Men's doubles
Bronze medal – third place	2003 Jakarta	Men's doubles
Bronze medal – third place	2004 Kuala Lumpur	Men's doubles
SEA Games
Gold medal – first place	1999 Bandar Seri Begawan	Men's team
Gold medal – first place	2007 Nakhon Ratchasima	Mixed doubles
Gold medal – first place	2007 Nakhon Ratchasima	Men's team
Silver medal – second place	1999 Bandar Seri Begawan	Men's doubles

Flandy Limpele (born 9 February 1974) is an Indonesian badminton player and coach. He competed in four Summer Olympic Games: Atlanta 1996, Sydney 2000, Athens 2004, and Beijing 2008.

== Career ==
=== Player ===
A doubles specialist, at various times Limpele has focused on either men's doubles or mixed doubles during his career in international badminton. His earliest appearances in the final rounds of major events came in mixed doubles in the mid-1990s. However, he first broke through internationally in men's doubles at the 1999 Korea Open with Eng Hian. His subsequent men's doubles titles, most of them with Hian, have included the Denmark (2000), Singapore (2002, 2006), Japan (2002), Bitburger (2002), German (2003) Opens, and the Copenhagen Masters (2000, 2004). Hian and Limpele briefly represented England from 2001 until 2003. They later returned to represent Indonesia for 2004 Summer Olympics. Limpele and Hian were runners-up at the All-England Championships in 2002, and bronze medalists at the 2004 Athens Olympics.

After 2004, Limpele gravitated back to mixed doubles. In 2006, he teamed with Vita Marissa to win a number of top tier events including the Singapore, Japan, French, and Chinese Taipei Opens, as well as the SEA Games title. They were bronze medalists at the 2007 World Championships in Kuala Lumpur, and won the Badminton Asia Championships together in 2008.

Limpele's strengths have been his racket-work, tactical astuteness, and anticipation.

=== Coaching ===
Limpele was appointed as Malaysian men's doubles coach in 2020, replacing Paulus Firman.

=== Participation at Indonesian Team ===
- 5 times at Sudirman Cup (1997, 1999, 2001, 2005, 2007)
- 1 time at Thomas Cup (2004)

== Achievements ==
=== Olympic Games ===
Men's doubles
Year	Venue	Partner	Opponent	Score	Result	Ref.
2004	Goudi Olympic Hall, Athens, Greece	(Indonesia) Eng Hian	(Denmark) Jens Eriksen (Denmark) Martin Lundgaard Hansen	15–13, 15–7	Bronze	

=== BWF World Championships ===
Mixed doubles
Year	Venue	Partner	Opponent	Score	Result	Ref.
2007	Putra Indoor Stadium, Kuala Lumpur, Malaysia	(Indonesia) Vita Marissa	(China) Zheng Bo (China) Gao Ling	21–17, 19–21, 19–21	Bronze	

=== World Cup ===
Mixed doubles
Year	Venue	Partner	Opponent	Score	Result	Ref.
1995	Istora Senayan; Jakarta, Indonesia	(Indonesia) Rosalina Riseu	(South Korea) Kim Dong-moon (South Korea) Kim Shin-young	15–9, 9–15, 14–17	Bronze	
1996	Istora Senayan; Jakarta, Indonesia	(Indonesia) Rosalina Riseu	(Indonesia) Sandiarto (Indonesia) Minarti Timur	14–17, 7–15	Silver	
1997	Among Rogo Sports Hall; Yogyakarta, Indonesia	(Indonesia) Rosalina Riseu	(China) Liu Yong (China) Ge Fei	15–12, 7–15, 2–15	Bronze	

=== World Senior Championships ===
Men's doubles
Year	Age	Venue	Partner	Opponent	Score	Result	Ref.
2015	35+	Helsingborg Arena; Helsingborg, Sweden	(United States) Tony Gunawan	(Thailand) Naruenart Chuaymak (Thailand) Apichai Thiraratsakul	21–13, 21–9	Gold	

=== Asian Championships ===
Men's doubles
Year	Venue	Partner	Opponent	Score	Result	Ref.
1998	Nimibutr Stadium; Bangkok, Thailand	(Indonesia) Eng Hian	(China) Zhang Jun (China) Zhang Wei	15–17, 15–9, 12–15	Bronze	
2003	Tennis Indoor Gelora Bung Karno; Jakarta, Indonesia	(Indonesia) Eng Hian	(Indonesia) Markis Kido (Indonesia) Hendra Setiawan	13–15, 15–11, 7–15	Bronze	
2004	Kuala Lumpur Badminton Stadium; Kuala Lumpur, Malaysia	(Indonesia) Eng Hian	(Indonesia) Halim Haryanto (Indonesia) Candra Wijaya	7–15, 11–15	Bronze	

Mixed doubles
Year	Venue	Partner	Opponent	Score	Result	Ref.
1996	Pancasila Hall; Surabaya, Indonesia	(Indonesia) Rosalina Riseu	(South Korea) Kang Kyung-jin (South Korea) Kim Mee-hyang	15–2, 7–15, 10–15	Bronze	
2008	Bandaraya Stadium; Johor Bahru, Malaysia	(Indonesia) Vita Marissa	(Indonesia) Nova Widianto (Indonesia) Liliyana Natsir	21–17, 21–17	Gold	

=== SEA Games ===
Men's doubles
Year	Venue	Partner	Opponent	Score	Result	Ref.
1999	Hassanal Bolkiah Sports Complex; Bandar Seri Begawan, Brunei	(Indonesia) Eng Hian	(Thailand) Tesana Panvisvas (Thailand) Pramote Teerawiwatana	8–15, 15–8, 13–15	Silver	

Mixed doubles
Year	Venue	Partner	Opponent	Score	Result	Ref.
2007	Wongchawalitkul University; Nakhon Ratchasima, Thailand	(Indonesia) Vita Marissa	(Thailand) Sudket Prapakamol (Thailand) Saralee Thungthongkam	21–14, 21–15	Gold	

=== BWF Superseries (2 titles, 1 runner-up) ===
The BWF Superseries, which was launched on 14 December 2006 and implemented in 2007, was a series of elite badminton tournaments, sanctioned by the Badminton World Federation (BWF). BWF Superseries levels were Superseries and Superseries Premier. A season of Superseries consisted of twelve tournaments around the world that had been introduced since 2011. Successful players were invited to the Superseries Finals, which were held at the end of each year.

Mixed doubles
Year	Tournament	Partner	Opponent	Score	Result	Ref.
2007	Singapore Open	(Indonesia) Vita Marissa	(Thailand) Sudket Prapakamol (Thailand) Saralee Thungthongkam	21–14, 21–13	(gold) Winner	
2007	French Open	(Indonesia) Vita Marissa	(China) Xie Zhongbo (China) Zhang Yawen	21–11, 21–15	(gold) Winner	
2008	Korea Open	(Indonesia) Vita Marissa	(South Korea) Lee Yong-dae (South Korea) Lee Hyo-jung	21–15, 14–21, 18–21	(silver) Runner-up	

BWF Super Series tournament

=== BWF Grand Prix (13 titles, 16 runners-up) ===
The BWF Grand Prix had two levels, the Grand Prix and Grand Prix Gold. It was a series of badminton tournaments sanctioned by the Badminton World Federation (BWF) and played between 2007 and 2017. The World Badminton Grand Prix was sanctioned by the International Badminton Federation from 1983 to 2006.

Men's doubles
Year	Tournament	Partner	Opponent	Score	Result	Ref.
1998	Indonesia Open	(Indonesia) Eng Hian	(Indonesia) Rexy Mainaky (Indonesia) Ricky Subagja	5–15, 4–15	(silver) Runner-up	
1998	Denmark Open	(Indonesia) Eng Hian	(Indonesia) Rexy Mainaky (Indonesia) Ricky Subagja	11–15, 6–15	(silver) Runner-up	
1999	Korea Open	(Indonesia) Eng Hian	(Denmark) Jens Eriksen (Denmark) Jesper Larsen	15–6, 15–7	(gold) Winner	
1999	Malaysia Open	(Indonesia) Eng Hian	(Indonesia) Tony Gunawan (Indonesia) Candra Wijaya	6–15, 11–15	(silver) Runner-up	
2000	Indonesia Open	(Indonesia) Eng Hian	(Indonesia) Tony Gunawan (Indonesia) Candra Wijaya	17–14, 6–15, 8–15	(silver) Runner-up	
2000	Denmark Open	(Indonesia) Eng Hian	(Denmark) Jens Eriksen (Denmark) Jesper Larsen	15–13, 15–10	(gold) Winner	
2000	Malaysia Open	(Indonesia) Eng Hian	(South Korea) Lee Dong-soo (South Korea) Yoo Yong-sung	15–9, 15–9	(gold) Winner	
2002	Singapore Open	(England) Eng Hian	(South Korea) Ha Tae-kwon (South Korea) Kim Dong-moon	15–8, 11–15, 17–14	(gold) Winner	
2002	Indonesia Open	(England) Eng Hian	(South Korea) Lee Dong-soo (South Korea) Yoo Yong-sung	10–15, 11–15	(silver) Runner-up	
2002	All England Open	(England) Eng Hian	(South Korea) Ha Tae-kwon (South Korea) Kim Dong-moon	2–7, 2–7, 7–1, 3–7	(silver) Runner-up	
2003	Swiss Open	(England) Eng Hian	(China) Cheng Rui (China) Chen Qiqiu	10–15, 15–5, 15–1	(gold) Winner	
2003	Japan Open	(England) Eng Hian	(China) Cheng Rui (China) Chen Qiqiu	15–5, 15–12	(gold) Winner	
2003	German Open	(Indonesia) Eng Hian	(China) Cai Yun (China) Fu Haifeng	9–15, 15–8, 15–4	(gold) Winner	
2003	Chinese Taipei Open	(Indonesia) Eng Hian	(South Korea) Ha Tae-kwon (South Korea) Kim Dong-moon	4–15, 1–15	(silver) Runner-up	
2005	Swiss Open	(Indonesia) Eng Hian	(Indonesia) Sigit Budiarto (Indonesia) Candra Wijaya	15–8, 11–15, 11–15	(silver) Runner-up	
2006	Singapore Open	(Indonesia) Sigit Budiarto	(Denmark) Thomas Laybourn (Denmark) Lars Paaske	21–8, 21–16	(gold) Winner	

Mixed doubles
Year	Tournament	Partner	Opponent	Score	Result	Ref.
1994	Indonesia Open	(Indonesia) Dede Hasanah	(China) Jiang Xin (China) Zhang Jin	3–15, 11–15	(silver) Runner-up	
1994	Dutch Open	(Indonesia) Dede Hasanah	(England) Chris Hunt (England) Gillian Gowers	5–15, 4–15	(silver) Runner-up	
1995	Indonesia Open	(Indonesia) Rosalina Riseu	(Indonesia) Tri Kusharjanto (Indonesia) Minarti Timur	10–15, 5–15	(silver) Runner-up	
1995	Denmark Open	(Indonesia) Rosalina Riseu	(China) Chen Xingdong (China) Peng Xinyong	15–3, 10–15, 12–15	(silver) Runner-up	
1996	Indonesia Open	(Indonesia) Rosalina Riseu	(Indonesia) Tri Kusharjanto (Indonesia) Minarti Timur	8–15, 1–15	(silver) Runner-up	
1996	Thailand Open	(Indonesia) Rosalina Riseu	(Indonesia) Tri Kusharjanto (Indonesia) Minarti Timur	5–15, 7–15	(silver) Runner-up	
1997	Polish Open	(Indonesia) Etty Tantri	(Indonesia) Imam Tohari (Indonesia) Emma Ermawati	15–7, 15–6	(gold) Winner	
1997	Swiss Open	(Indonesia) Minarti Timur	(China) Liu Yong (China) Ge Fei	9–15, 9–15	(silver) Runner-up	
2006	Dutch Open	(Indonesia) Vita Marissa	(England) Robert Blair (England) Jenny Wallwork	18–21, 18–21	(silver) Runner-up	
2006	Japan Open	(Indonesia) Vita Marissa	(Indonesia) Nova Widianto (Indonesia) Liliyana Natsir	11–21, 21–18, 21–17	(gold) Winner	
2007	Chinese Taipei Open	(Indonesia) Vita Marissa	(Denmark) Thomas Laybourn (Denmark) Kamilla Rytter Juhl	21–18, 25–23	(gold) Winner	
2009	India Open	(Indonesia) Vita Marissa	(India) V. Diju (India) Jwala Gutta	21–14, 21–17	(gold) Winner	
2009	Vietnam Open	(Chinese Taipei) Cheng Wen-hsing	(Malaysia) Chan Peng Soon (Malaysia) Goh Liu Ying	25–23, 21–19	(gold) Winner	

BWF Grand Prix Gold tournament
BWF Grand Prix tournament

=== BWF International Challenge/Series/Satellite (3 titles) ===
Men's doubles
Year	Tournament	Partner	Opponent	Score	Result	Ref.
2002	BMW Open International	(England) Simon Archer	(England) Anthony Clark (England) Nathan Robertson	15–5, 17–14	(gold) Winner	

Mixed doubles
Year	Tournament	Partner	Opponent	Score	Result	Ref.
1994	Polish Open	(Indonesia) Dede Hasanah	Vitaliy Shmakov; Svetlana Szumska	15–3, 15–3	(gold) Winner	
2009	White Nights	(Russia) Anastasia Russkikh	(Russia) Vitalij Durkin (Russia) Nina Vislova	21–14, 25–23	(gold) Winner	

BWF International Challenge tournament
BWF International Series tournament

=== Invitational tournaments ===
Men's doubles
Year	Tournament	Partner	Opponent	Score	Result	Ref.
1999	Ipoh Masters	(Indonesia) Eng Hian	(Indonesia) Candra Wijaya (Indonesia) Tony Gunawan	11–15, 9–15	(silver) Runner-up	
2000	Copenhagen Masters	(Indonesia) Eng Hian	(Indonesia) Tony Gunawan (Indonesia) Halim Haryanto	8–7, 5–7, 7–4, 5–7, 7–5	(gold) Winner	
2004	Copenhagen Masters	(Indonesia) Eng Hian	(China) Sang Yang (China) Zheng Bo	15–13, 15–5	(gold) Winner	

== Performance timeline ==
=== Indonesian team ===
- Senior level

Team Events	1999	2007
SEA Games	Gold	Gold

Team Events	2004
Thomas Cup	Bronze

Team Events	1997	2005	2007
Sudirman Cup	Bronze	Silver	Silver

=== Individual competitions ===
- Senior level

Event	1999	2007
SEA Games	Silver (MD)	Gold (XD)

Event	1996	1998	2003	2004	2008
Asia Championships	Bronze (XD)	Bronze (MD)	Bronze (MD)	Bronze (MD)	Gold (XD)

Event	1996
World Cup	Silver (XD)

Event	1995	1997	1999	2001	2003	2005	2006	2007
World Championships	R3 (XD)	R2 (XD)	QF (MD)	R1 (MD)	A	QF (MD)	A	Bronze (XD)

Event	1996	2000	2004	2008
Olympics	QF (XD)	QF (MD)	Bronze (MD)	4th (XD)

Tournament	2007	2008	2009	2010	2011	Best
BWF Super Series
All England Open	R2 (XD)	R1 (XD)	SF (XD)	A		F (2002)
(Switzerland) Swiss Open		QF (XD)	R1 (XD)	A	GPG	W (2003)
Malaysia Open	QF (XD)	R1 (XD)	A	QF (XD)	R1 (MD)	F (1999, 2000)
Singapore Open	W (XD)		A			W (2002, 2006, 2007)
Indonesia Open	R1 (XD)	SF (XD)	R1 (XD)	R1 (XD)	A	F (1994, 1995, 1996, 1998, 2000, 2002)
(South Korea) Korea Open		F (XD)	R1 (XD)	SF (XD)	R2 (MD)	W (1999)
Japan Open	QF (XD)	QF (XD)	R2 (MD)	R1 (XD)	A	W (2003, 2006)
Denmark Open	QF (XD)	A		R1 (MD)	A	W (2000)
(France) French Open	W (XD)	R1 (XD)	A	QF (MD)	A	W (2007)
BWF Superseries Finals	—N/a	GS (XD)	NQ			GS (2008)

Tournament	1994	1995	1996	1997	1998	1999	2000	2001	2002	2003	2004	2005	2006	2007	2008	2009	2010	2011	Best
BWF Grand Prix and Grand Prix Gold
All England Open								SF (MD)	F (MD)	QF (MD); R2 (XD)	SF (MD)	QF (MD)	A	SS					F (2002)
Chinese Taipei Open					—N/a			—N/a		F (MD)				W (XD)			A		W (2007)
Denmark Open		F (XD)			F (MD)	QF (MD)	W (MD)	SF (MD)				A	QF (XD)	SS					W (2000)
(Netherlands) Dutch Open	F (XD)	—N/a	A										F (XD)			A			F (1994, 2006)
(Germany) German Open	—N/a									W (MD)				A		QF (MD); SF (XD)	A	R1 (MD)	W (2003)
India Open	—N/a														A	W (XD)	A	SS	W (2009)
Indonesia Open	R2 (MD); F (XD)	F (XD)	F (XD)		F (MD)	QF (MD)	F (MD)		F (MD)		SF (MD)		R2 (MD)	SS					F (1994, 1995, 1996, 1998, 2000, 2002)
Japan Open										W (MD)			W (XD)	SS					W (2003, 2006)
(South Korea) Korea Open					—N/a	W (MD)								SS					W (1999)
Malaysia Open						F (MD)	F (MD)							SS					F (1999, 2000)
(Poland) Polish Open	W (XD)			W (XD)				—N/a											W (1994, 1997)
Singapore Open			—N/a				—N/a		W (MD)				W (MD)	SS					W (2002, 2006)
(Switzerland) Swiss Open				F (XD)						W (MD)		F (MD)		SS				A	W (2003)
Thailand Open			F (XD)		—N/a				—N/a								—N/a		F (1996)
Vietnam Open	—N/a				—N/a											W (XD)			W (2009)
Tournament	1994	1995	1996	1997	1998	1999	2000	2001	2002	2003	2004	2005	2006	2007	2008	2009	2010	2011	Best
