= 2006 Singapore Open =

Tournament details
- Dates: 5 June 2006– 11 June 2006
- Edition: 57th
- Level: World Grand Prix 5 Stars
- Total prize money: US$170,000
- Venue: Singapore Indoor Stadium
- Location: Kallang, Singapore

Champions
- Men's singles: (Denmark) Peter Gade
- Women's singles: (France) Pi Hongyan
- Men's doubles: (Indonesia) Sigit Budiarto (Indonesia) Flandy Limpele
- Women's doubles: (China) Yang Wei (China) Zhang Jiewen
- Mixed doubles: (Indonesia) Nova Widianto (Indonesia) Liliyana Natsir

The 2006 Singapore Open (officially known as the Aviva Open Singapore 2006 for sponsorship reasons) was a five-star badminton tournament that took place at Singapore Indoor Stadium in Singapore, from June 5 to June 11, 2006. The total prize money on offer was US$170,000.

== Final results ==
Category	Champion	Runners-up	Score	Match duration
Men's Singles	(Denmark) Peter Gade	(Denmark) Kenneth Jonassen	21–10, 21–14	0:35
Women's Singles	(France) Pi Hongyan	(Netherlands) Mia Audina	22–20, 22–20	0:45
Men's Doubles	(Indonesia) Flandy Limpele / Sigit Budiarto	(Denmark) Thomas Laybourn / Lars Paaske	21–8, 21–16	0:35
Women's Doubles	(China) Yang Wei / Zhang Jiewen	(China) Zhang Dan / Zhao Tingting	21–18, 21–18	0:32
Mixed Doubles	(Indonesia) Nova Widianto / Lilyana Natsir	(England) Nathan Robertson / Gail Emms	21–16, 20–22, 23–21	1:07

== Men's singles ==
Quarterfinals
1	(Denmark) Peter Gade	21	21
8	(Singapore) Ronald Susilo	19	16
4	(China) Bao Chunlai	21	21
5	(Malaysia) Saman Ismail	11	11
3	(Malaysia) Muhd Hafiz B Hashim	21	14	15
6	(China) Chen Hong	13	21	21
2	(India) Anup Sridhar	15	15
7	(Denmark) Kenneth Jonassen	21	21

Semifinals
(Denmark) Peter Gade	21	16	21
(China) Bao Chunlai	15	21	17
(China) Chen Hong	23	21	16
(Denmark) Kenneth Jonassen	25	19	21

Finals
(Denmark) Peter Gade	21	21
(Denmark) Kenneth Jonassen	10	14

== Women's singles ==
Semifinals
(Netherlands) Mia Audina	21	19	23
(China) Lu Lan	8	21	21
(Bulgaria) Petya Nedelcheva	18	11
(France) Pi Hongyan	21	21

Final
(Netherlands) Mia Audina	20	20
(France) Pi Hongyan	22	22

== Men's doubles ==
Semifinals
(England) Anthony Clark (England) Robert Blair	18	13
(Indonesia) Flandy Limpele (Indonesia) Sigit Budiarto	21	21
(Denmark) Jonas Rasmussen (Denmark) Peter Steffensen	21	14	15
(Denmark) Thomas Laybourn (Denmark) Lars Paaske	17	21	21

Final
(Indonesia) Flandy Limpele (Indonesia) Sigit Budiarto	21	21
(Denmark) Thomas Laybourn (Denmark) Lars Paaske	8	16

== Women's doubles ==
Semifinals
(China) Yang Wei (China) Zhang Jiewen	21	21
(Chinese Taipei) Cheng Wen-Hsing (Chinese Taipei) Chien Yu Chin	11	19
(China) Wei Yili (China) Zhang Yawen	18	22	14
(China) Zhang Dan (China) Zhao Tingting	21	20	21

Final
(China) Yang Wei (China) Zhang Jiewen	21	21
(China) Zhang Dan (China) Zhao Tingting	18	18

== Mixed doubles ==
Semifinals
(England) Nathan Robertson (England) Gail Emms	21	21
(China) He Hanbin (China) Zhang Dan	9	13
(Indonesia) Nova Widianto (Indonesia) Lilyana Natsir	21	21
(Indonesia) Muhammad Rijal (Indonesia) Greysia Polii	13	10

Final
(England) Nathan Robertson (England) Gail Emms	16	22	21
(Indonesia) Nova Widianto (Indonesia) Lilyana Natsir	21	20	23
