= Liliyana Natsir =

Indonesian badminton player (born 1985)

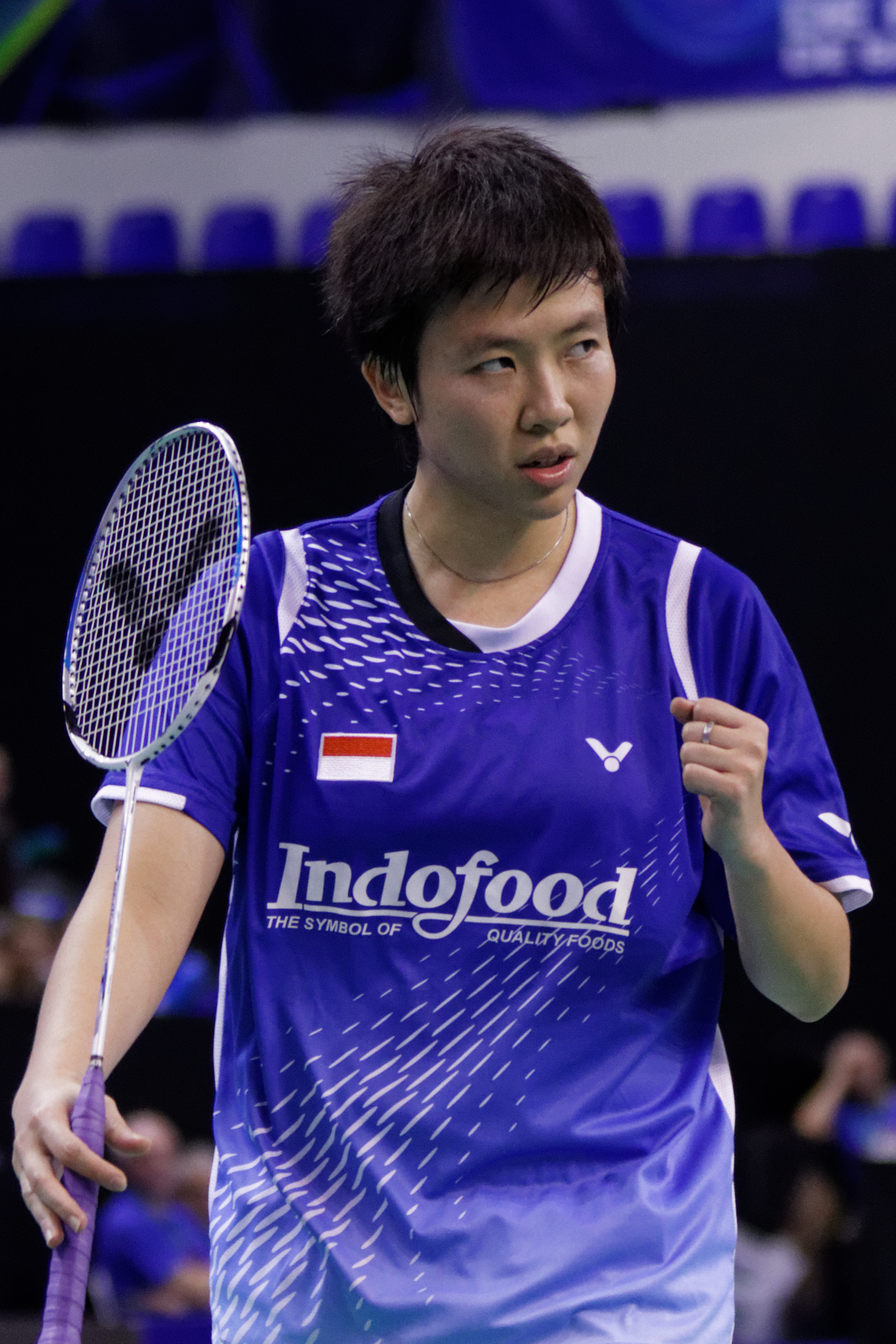
- Natsir at the 2013 French Open

Personal information
- Nickname: Butet
- Born: 9 September 1985 (age 41) Manado, North Sulawesi, Indonesia
- Years active: 2001–2019
- Height: 1.68 m (5 ft 6 in)
- Weight: 59 kg (130 lb)

Sport
- Country: Indonesia
- Sport: Badminton
- Handedness: Right
- Coached by: Richard Mainaky

Mixed doubles
- Highest ranking: 5 (WD with Vita Marissa 2 October 2008); 1 (XD with Nova Widianto 25 August 2005); 1 (XD with Tontowi Ahmad 3 May 2018)
- BWF profile
Medal record
Women's badminton
Representing Indonesia
Olympic Games
Gold medal – first place	2016 Rio de Janeiro	Mixed doubles
Silver medal – second place	2008 Beijing	Mixed doubles
World Championships
Gold medal – first place	2005 Anaheim	Mixed doubles
Gold medal – first place	2007 Kuala Lumpur	Mixed doubles
Gold medal – first place	2013 Guangzhou	Mixed doubles
Gold medal – first place	2017 Glasgow	Mixed doubles
Silver medal – second place	2009 Hyderabad	Mixed doubles
Bronze medal – third place	2011 London	Mixed doubles
Bronze medal – third place	2015 Jakarta	Mixed doubles
World Cup
Gold medal – first place	2006 Yiyang	Mixed doubles
Silver medal – second place	2005 Yiyang	Mixed doubles
Sudirman Cup
Silver medal – second place	2005 Beijing	Mixed team
Silver medal – second place	2007 Glasgow	Mixed team
Bronze medal – third place	2003 Eindhoven	Mixed team
Bronze medal – third place	2009 Guangzhou	Mixed team
Bronze medal – third place	2011 Qingdao	Mixed team
Bronze medal – third place	2015 Dongguan	Mixed team
Uber Cup
Silver medal – second place	2008 Jakarta	Women's team
Bronze medal – third place	2010 Kuala Lumpur	Women's team
Asian Games
Silver medal – second place	2014 Incheon	Mixed doubles
Bronze medal – third place	2010 Guangzhou	Women's team
Bronze medal – third place	2018 Jakarta–Palembang	Mixed doubles
Bronze medal – third place	2018 Jakarta–Palembang	Women's team
Asian Championships
Gold medal – first place	2006 Johor Bahru	Mixed doubles
Gold medal – first place	2015 Wuhan	Mixed doubles
Silver medal – second place	2008 Johor Bahru	Mixed doubles
Silver medal – second place	2016 Wuhan	Mixed doubles
Silver medal – second place	2018 Wuhan	Mixed doubles
Bronze medal – third place	2008 Johor Bahru	Women's doubles
Bronze medal – third place	2010 New Delhi	Mixed doubles
SEA Games
Gold medal – first place	2005 Manila	Mixed doubles
Gold medal – first place	2007 Nakhon Ratchasima	Women's doubles
Gold medal – first place	2007 Nakhon Ratchasima	Women's team
Gold medal – first place	2009 Vientiane	Mixed doubles
Gold medal – first place	2011 Jakarta–Palembang	Mixed doubles
Silver medal – second place	2003 Vietnam	Women's doubles
Silver medal – second place	2009 Vientiane	Women's team
Silver medal – second place	2011 Jakarta–Palembang	Women's team
Bronze medal – third place	2003 Vietnam	Women's team
Bronze medal – third place	2005 Manila	Women's team
Bronze medal – third place	2007 Nakhon Ratchasima	Mixed doubles
World Junior Championships
Bronze medal – third place	2002 Pretoria	Girls' doubles
Bronze medal – third place	2002 Pretoria	Mixed doubles
Bronze medal – third place	2002 Pretoria	Mixed team
Asian Junior Championships
Gold medal – first place	2002 Kuala Lumpur	Mixed doubles
Bronze medal – third place	2001 Taipei	Girls' team

Liliyana Natsir (born 9 September 1985) is an Indonesian badminton player who specialized in doubles. Natsir has won a gold and a silver at the Olympic Games, and four gold medals at the BWF World Championships. She was inducted in the BWF Hall of Fame in 2022.

Natsir was ranked world number 1 in the mixed doubles with two different partners. Together with Nova Widianto, she won the gold medal at the 2005 and 2007 World Championships; 2006 World Cup; 2006 Asian Championships; and a silver medal at the 2008 Beijing Olympics. Natsir was then paired with Tontowi Ahmad and the duo clinched the BWF World Championships title in 2013 and 2017; won the 2015 Asian Championships; and also the gold medal at the 2016 Rio Olympics. Natsir and Ahmad topped the mixed doubles world ranking on 3 May 2018.

Natsir was the second Indonesian woman Olympic gold medalist, after Susi Susanti in 1992, and was later succeeded by Greysia Polii and Apriyani Rahayu in 2021. Among her achievements is her three back-to-back titles from the 2012–2014 All England Open; and in 2016, she and Ahmad became the first Indonesian mixed doubles pair to win a gold medal at the Olympics. She holds the highest number of BWF World Championship titles for mixed doubles.

== Early life ==
Natsir is the youngest child of the couple Beno Natsir and Olly Maramis (Auw Jin Chen). She started playing badminton at the age of nine at her local badminton club, PB Pisok, in Manado. Three years later, she decided to move to Jakarta and entered her youth club, Tangkas Alfamart. She joined the national badminton team of Indonesia in 2002 together with Natalia Christine Poluakan, her longtime friend from Manado. When she and Poluakan won the women's doubles title in Pekan Olahraga Nasional (National Games), Richard Mainaky noticed her game and invited her to play in mixed doubles with Nova Widianto.

== Career ==
=== 2000–2002: Early career, Asian Junior champion ===
As a Tangkas player, Natsir started to rise in the women's doubles when she and her partner Natalia Christine Poluakan won some several national tournaments in 2000. She first entered the international stage at the 2001 Asian Junior Championships in Taipei Taiwan, where she and her teammates won the bronze medal in the girls' team event. She played at her first Indonesia Open with Poluakan, but the duo was stopped in the first round. Natsir and Poluakan then took the victory at the Indonesian Junior National Championships, led her to join the national training center. Partnered with Markis Kido, she won the mixed doubles title at the 2002 Asian Junior Championships. She also claimed three bronze medals in the mixed team, girls' doubles and mixed doubles at the World Junior Championships.

=== 2003–2005: Southeast Asian gold, World Champion ===
In 2003, Natsir focused on playing in the women's doubles. She started her journey in the IBF Grand Prix event with partner Eny Erlangga. Natsir also made her debut at the World Championships with Devi Sukma Wijaya, but was stopped in the second round. In December, Natsir took part at the 2003 SEA Games in Vietnam, and won a silver in the women's doubles and a bronze in the team event. From January to October 2004, Natsir competed in the women's doubles with different partners; Poluakan, Erlangga, Rintan Apriliana, and Greysia Polii. She was able to go further when paired with Polii, when the duo finished as quarter-finalist in the Malaysia Open. Natsir then competed in the Pekan Olahraga Nasional, where she and her partner, Poluakan, won a gold medal for their hometown of North Sulawesi. Indonesia mixed doubles coach, Richard Mainaky invited Natsir to play in the mixed doubles. and made her debut with Nova Widianto, reaching the semi-finals in the China Open. A week later, Natsir claimed her first Grand Prix title in the Singapore Open, beating the Malaysian pair Koo Kien Keat and Wong Pei Tty with a score of 15–1 and 15–4.

Natsir and Widianto reached the finals in the Swiss Open; semi-finals in the Korea and All England Opens; and quarter-finals in the Japan, Singapore, and the Malaysia Opens. She also took part in the Sudirman Cup, where Indonesia team finished as finalists against China. In August, Natsir and Widianto secured the gold at the World Championships over China's up and coming Xie Zhongbo and Zhang Yawen. They ended a 12-year title drought in the mixed doubles and becoming the second Indonesia pair to win the title, after Christian Hadinata and Imelda Wiguna in 1980. After the victory, Natsir and Widianto topped the mixed doubles's ranking on 25 August 2005 for the first time. A month later, they cliched home soil title, the Indonesia Open. In December, Natsir and Widianto won the gold medal in the SEA Games, and ended the 2005 season by winning a silver medal in the World Cup.

=== 2006: Asian champions and World Cup title ===
In 2006, Natsir and her partner, Widianto won the Asian Championships and three World Grand Prix titles. They started the year as the semi-finalist in the All England Open, lost to last year champion Nathan Robertson and Gail Emms. She played for Indonesia women's team squad in the qualification for the Uber Cup, but the team did not advance to the women's team championships. In April, Natsir claimed her first Asian Championships title by defeating Thai pair Sudket Prapakamol and Saralee Thungthongkam in the final. At the Indonesia Open in June, Natsir and Widianto lost to Xie Zhongbo and Zhang Yawen. A week later, they won their first Grand Prix title of the year in the Singapore Open after defeating Robertson and Emms in the final. They then went on to win the Chinese Taipei and Korea Opens. They were stopped by Zheng Bo and Zhao Tingting in the final of the Hong Kong Open.

As the top seeds in the IBF World Championships, Natsir and Widianto suffered a defeat in the third round to Koo Kien Keat and Wong Pei Tty. They then reached the Japan Open finals, but lost to their compatriot Flandy Limpele and Vita Marissa. At the World Cup in Yiyang, China, Natsir and Widianto convert their last year silver to gold medal by defeating Xie Zhongbo and Zhang Yawen. She competed in the Asian Games in Doha, Qatar, but unable to contribute medals to her country.

=== 2007: Second World Championships title ===
Natsir and Widianto partnership started half of the 2007 season without holding any titles. They had reached the final round in the Indonesia Open, but were defeated by Zheng Bo and Gao Ling. She then made her third appearance at the Sudirman Cup, but Indonesia team still unable to lifted the trophy from the defending champion China. While Natsir has been focused on mixed doubles with partner Nova Widianto, she returned to the women's doubles competitive stage with Vita Marissa and together they won the China Masters. In July, Natsir and Widianto captured their first title of the year in the Philippines Open. They then clinched their second World Championships title beating top seed Zheng Bo and Gao Ling in the final. In September Japan Open, Natsir and her partner were defeated in the second round in the women's doubles and in the final in the mixed doubles both by Gao Ling and her partner. The defeat suffered by Natsir–Widianto at the final of the Japan Open made their head to head record against Gao–Zheng deficit to 2–3. They then won two tournaments in a row, in the China and Hong Kong Open. In the SEA Games in Thailand, Natsir and Marissa won the gold medal in the women's doubles, defeating their Indonesian teammates Jo Novita and Greysia Polii in straight game. They also helped the Indonesian women's team win the team gold medal at the games.

=== 2008–2009: Beijing Olympics and World Championships silver medalists ===
Natsir began the 2008 season playing at the Malaysia and Korea Open in January. In the mixed doubles with her partner Widianto, they were stopped in the quarter-finals in Malaysia and in the first round in Korea both by South Korean pair Lee Yong-dae and Lee Hyo jung. Also along with Marissa in the women's doubles, they were beaten in the second round in Malaysia and in the quarter-finals in Korea. On a European tour, Natsir and Widianto reached the final in the All England Open and in the semi-finals in the Swiss Open. Meanwhile, in the women's doubles, Natsir and Marissa were stopped in the second round in both tournaments. At the Asian Championships in Johor Bahru, Malaysia, Natsir clinched a silver in the mixed doubles and a bronze in the women's doubles. Together with Indonesia women's team squad, Natsir helped the team reach the final of the Uber Cup. Natsir and her partner, Widianto, won their first title of the year in the Singapore Open. She then won the women's doubles title with Marissa at the Indonesia Open.

Natsir competed in badminton at the 2008 Summer Olympics in mixed doubles with partner Nova Widianto and earned a silver medal. They were defeated in the final by the gold medalists Lee Yong-dae and Lee Hyo-jung of South Korea in straight game 21–11 and 21–17. She also competed in the women's doubles event with Vita Marissa but lost to Yang Wei and Zhang Jiewen of China in the first round. After the Olympics, Natsir and Widianto reached the final in the Japan Open and China Masters. They also finished as semi-finalists in the French Open, and quarter-finalists in the Hong Kong Open. While with Marissa, she reached the semi-finals in the Japan Open; and also in the quarter-finals in the China Masters, French and Hong Kong Opens. Natsir qualified to compete at the Super Series Masters Finals in both mixed and women's doubles. She and her partner progressed to the finals, but lost the match to Chin Eei Hui and Wong Pei Tty of Malaysia in the women's doubles in straight game and also to Thomas Laybourn and Kamilla Rytter Juhl of Denmark in the mixed doubles in a close three games.

Natsir opened the 2009 season by winning the Malaysia Open in the mixed doubles event with Nova Widianto. The duo beating reigning Olympic champion Lee Yong-dae and Lee Hyo-jung in straight game in the final. Her women's doubles partner, Vita Marissa, resigned from the national team in early 2009. When this decision came out, Marissa and Natsir had to split up and each focus on their own careers. They play their last tournament together in the Malaysia Open reaching in to the quarter-finals. Competing as the top seed, Natsir and Widianto had to suffered an early exit in the Korea Open; and later reached the semi-finals in the Singapore Open; and also in the quarter-finals in the All England, Swiss and Indonesia Opens. Throughout half of the 2009 season, they suffered two defeats by Zheng Bo with his new partner Ma Jin in the Swiss and Indonesia Opens. In August, Natsir and Widianto progressed to the final of the World Championships, but was defeated by Thomas Laybourn and Kamilla Rytter Juhl. They then won the title in the French Open, and also finished as finalist in the Hong Kong Open. Natsir then participated in her fourth Southeast Asian Games, winning a gold medal in the mixed doubles with Widianto and a silver in the women's team. Natsir and Widianto ended the 2009 season ranked as world number 2.

=== 2010: Three different partners ===
Natsir started the 2010 season in the Malaysia Open with her partner Nova Widianto. Unfortunately, they suffered a defeat in the first round to Ko Sung-hyun and Ha Jung-eun. They were later able to improve their performance by reaching the final in the All England Open. Faced Zhang Nan and Zhao Yunlei, they lost the match in three games. Natsir tried partnership with Devin Lahardi Fitriawan, which according to national coach, Richard Mainaky, Fitriawan was able to equal Natsir's abilities. They reached the semi-finals in the Asian Championships. Back in pairs with Widianto, they progressed to the Singapore Open final, but were defeated by Thomas Laybourn and Kamilla Rytter Juhl. This was for the third time in a row they were beaten by this Danish pair. At the Indonesia Open, Natsir and Widianto lost the semi-finals match to Robert Mateusiak and Nadieżda Zięba of Poland. Together with Fitriawan, she won the Malaysia Grand Prix Gold title beating Thai veterans Sudket Prapakamol and Saralee Thungthongkam in the final.

In July 2010 Mainaky tried to pair Natsir with youngster Tontowi Ahmad. Their debut produced positive results as they won the Macau Open, beating Hendra Aprida Gunawan and Vita Marissa in the final. A week later, Natsir and Ahmad lost to Gunawan and Marissa in the final of the Chinese Taipei Open in a close rubber games. Competing as the top seeds in the BWF World Championships, Natsir and Widianto were stopped in the quarter-finals to Zheng Bo and Ma Jin. This was the third consecutive defeat experienced by the pair to Zheng and Ma. In their last two tournaments, Natsir and Widianto were defeated by Chinese pairs Xu Chen and Yu Yang in the quarter-finals of the China Masters and to Zhang Nan and Zhao Yunlei in the second round of the Japan Open. Natsir and Widianto partnership split in September 2010. In total, Widianto and Natsir had clinched two World Championship gold medals and 14 titles all together, and were still at world #1 when the decision was announced. In October, Natsir and Ahmad won a Grand Prix Gold title in Samarinda, Indonesia, over an independent pair Markis Kido and Lita Nurlita. Unfortunately, in their debut at the Asian Games, they were beaten by 5th seeds from Chinese Taipei Chen Hung-ling and Cheng Wen-hsing in the second round in straight games.

=== 2011–2012: Fifth SEA Games gold, World Championships bronze, first All England title, and London Olympics ===
Natsir opened the 2011 season with Tontowi Ahmad with unsatisfactory results. They were beaten in the early rounds at the Malaysia Open, in the quarter-finals at the Korea Open, and in the second round at the All England Open. At the Swiss Open, she played in two events. In the mixed doubles with Ahmad, they finished as semi-finalists, while in the women's doubles with Pia Zebadiah Bernadet, they were defeated in the first round. Natsir and Ahmad then increased their performance, by winning three titles in a row, the India Open, Malaysia Grand Prix Gold, and the Singapore Open. After back-to-back titles in May to June they reached a career high as world number 2 in the world, and then able to reach the final at the Indonesia Open losing to current world number 1 Zhang Nan and Zhao Yunlei. The duo also won a bronze medal at the World Championships in London.

In September, Natsir and Ahmad reached the final of the Chinese Taipei Open, lose to Ko Sung-hyun and Eom Hye-won. She competed at the 2011 SEA Games, won a gold medal in the mixed doubles with Ahmad, and also a silver with Indonesia women's team. Natsir and Ahmad then won the title at the Macau Open, after received a walkover by Chen Hung-ling and Cheng Wen-hsing in the final. The duo then qualified to compete at the World Super Series Finals, but they were eliminated in the group stage.

Kicked off the 2012 season, Natsir and her partner, Ahmad, unable go further in the Korea and Malaysia Open being stopped in the quarter-finals and semi-finals respectively. In March, Natsir and Ahmad clinched their first All England Open title together, and made this victory as the first ever Indonesia mixed doubles title after 33 years.

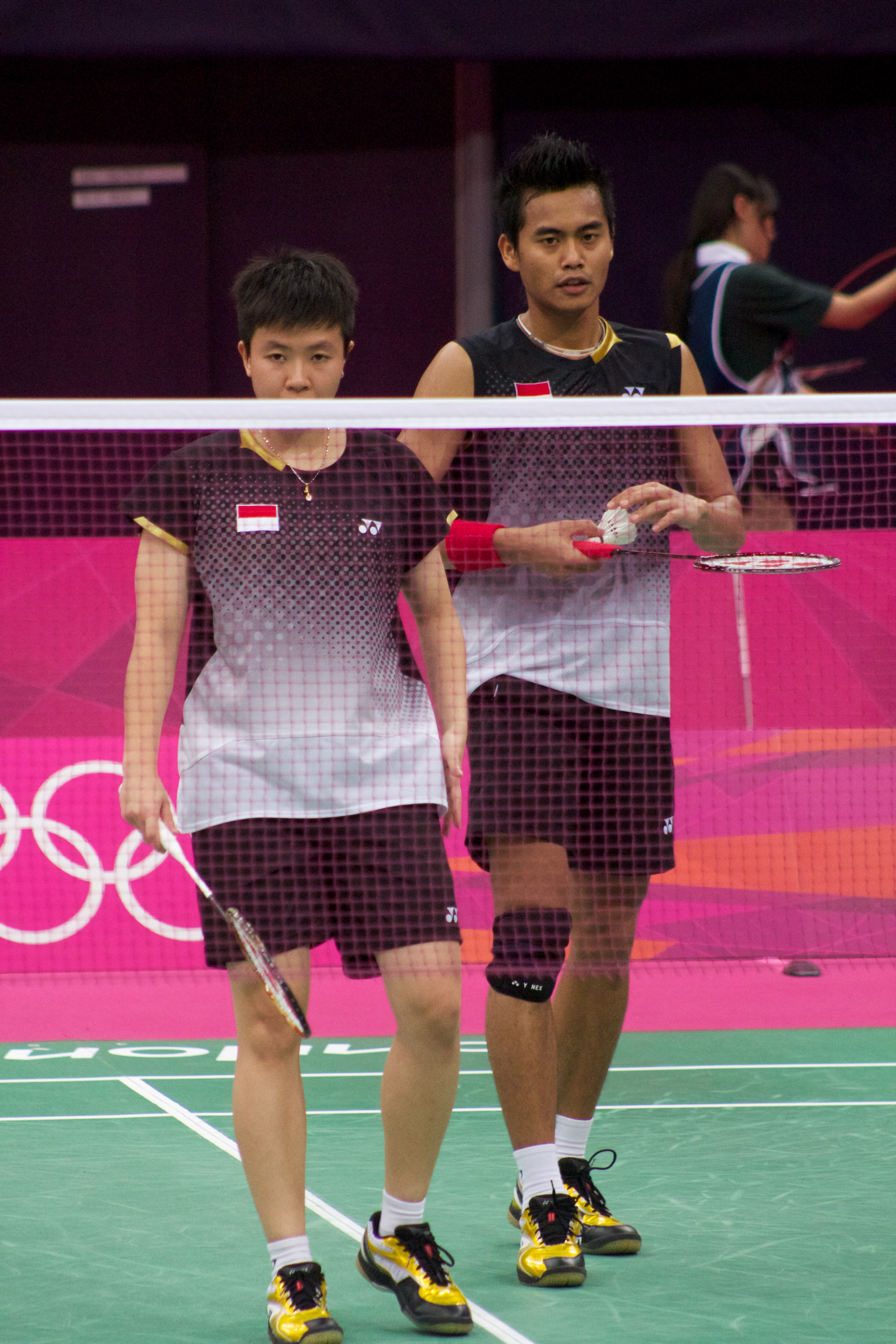
Natsir and Ahmad at 2012 Summer Olympics

Natsir competed in the mixed doubles at the 2012 Summer Olympics with partner Tontowi Ahmad as fourth seed. The duo topped the group C standings without dropping a game. In the quarter-finals, they beat German pair Michael Fuchs and Birgit Michels, but they had to admit the toughness of the second seeds Xu Chen and Ma Jin in the semi-finals. They finally could not present a medal for Indonesia after losing the bronze medal match to Joachim Fischer Nielsen and Christinna Pedersen.

=== 2013: Third World Championships title ===
Natsir won the 2013 BWF World Championships in Guangzhou together with her partner Tontowi Ahmad, after beating then-No.1 world ranked Zhang Nan and Zhao Yunlei in the semifinal and the top seed Xu Chen and Ma Jin in the final.

=== 2014: Third All England Open title ===
Natsir won the All England Open for three consecutive times from 2012 to 2014. Natsir participated at the 2014 Asian Games in Incheon, South Korea, and won a silver medal in mixed doubles with Ahmad.

=== 2015: Second Asian Championships title ===
In 2015, she won a gold medal in the 2015 Asian Championships. In the final, she and Ahmad ousted Lee Chun Hei and Chau Hoi Wah of Hong Kong with a score of 21–16, 21–15, and lead the head-to-head against those pair to 3–0.

=== 2016: Rio Olympics gold medal ===
Natsir has made three Olympics appearances. Natsir competed in mixed doubles in 2016 with partner Tontowi Ahmad and won the gold medal in the end.

2016 Summer Olympics – Mixed doubles
Round	Partner	Opponent	Score	Result
Group stage	(Indonesia) Tontowi Ahmad [3]	(Australia) Robin Middleton (Australia) Leanne Choo	21–7, 21–8	Win
Group stage	(Indonesia) Tontowi Ahmad [3]	(Thailand) Bodin Issara (Thailand) Savitree Amitrapai	21–11, 21–13	Win
Group stage	(Indonesia) Tontowi Ahmad [3]	(Malaysia) Chan Peng Soon (Malaysia) Goh Liu Ying	21–15, 21–11	Win
Quarterfinal	(Indonesia) Tontowi Ahmad [3]	(Indonesia) Praveen Jordan (Indonesia) Debby Susanto	21–16, 21–11	Win
Semifinal	(Indonesia) Tontowi Ahmad [3]	(China) Zhang Nan [1] (China) Zhao Yunlei	21–16, 21–15	Win
Final	(Indonesia) Tontowi Ahmad [3]	(Malaysia) Chan Peng Soon (Malaysia) Goh Liu Ying	21–14, 21–12	Gold

=== 2017: Fourth World Championships title ===
In 2017 BWF World Championships in Glasgow, Natsir and Ahmad again defeated the current world no.1 from China Zheng Siwei and Chen Qingchen to win her fourth World Championships title.

=== 2018: World ranking number 1 with Ahmad ===
Natsir and Ahmad achieved the World No. 1 in May 2018.

== Awards and nominations ==
Award	Year	Category	Result	Ref.
Badminton World Federation Awards	2022	Badminton Hall of Fame	Honored	
BWF Awards	2016	Golden Shuttle Award with Tontowi Ahmad	Won	
Golden Award SIWO PWI	2017	Best of the Best with Tontowi Ahmad	Won	
Indonesian Sport Awards	2018	Favorite Mixed Pair with Tontowi Ahmad	Won	
Indonesian Sport Awards	2018	Favorite Women's Team (2018 Asian Games women's badminton team)	Won	
iNews Maker Award	2017	Best Athlete with Tontowi Ahmad	Won	
KONI Award	2013	Best Athlete with Tontowi Ahmad	Won	
Nickelodeon Indonesia Kids' Choice Awards	2014	Favorite Athlete with Tontowi Ahmad	Won	
Nickelodeon Indonesia Kids' Choice Awards	2016	Favorite Athlete with Tontowi Ahmad	Nominated	
Seputar Indonesia Awards	2012	Arena Star with Tontowi Ahmad	Nominated	
Seputar Indonesia Awards	2013	Arena Star with Tontowi Ahmad	Nominated	
Seputar Indonesia Awards	2014	Arena Star with Tontowi Ahmad	Won	
Seputar Indonesia Awards	2016	Arena Star with Tontowi Ahmad	Nominated	
Sindo People of the Year	2013	People of the Year (Sports)	Won	

== Achievements ==
=== Olympic Games ===
Mixed doubles
Year	Venue	Partner	Opponent	Score	Result
2008	Beijing University of Technology Gymnasium, Beijing, China	(Indonesia) Nova Widianto	(South Korea) Lee Yong-dae (South Korea) Lee Hyo-jung	11–21, 17–21	Silver
2016	Riocentro - Pavilion 4, Rio de Janeiro, Brazil	(Indonesia) Tontowi Ahmad	(Malaysia) Chan Peng Soon (Malaysia) Goh Liu Ying	21–14, 21–12	Gold

=== BWF World Championships ===
Mixed doubles
Year	Venue	Partner	Opponent	Score	Result	Ref.
2005	Arrowhead Pond, Anaheim, United States	(Indonesia) Nova Widianto	(China) Xie Zhongbo (China) Zhang Yawen	13–15, 15–8, 15–2	Gold	
2007	Putra Indoor Stadium, Kuala Lumpur, Malaysia	(Indonesia) Nova Widianto	(China) Zheng Bo (China) Gao Ling	21–16, 21–14	Gold	
2009	Gachibowli Indoor Stadium, Hyderabad, India	(Indonesia) Nova Widianto	(Denmark) Thomas Laybourn (Denmark) Kamilla Rytter Juhl	13–21, 17–21	Silver	
2011	Wembley Arena, London, England	(Indonesia) Tontowi Ahmad	(England) Chris Adcock (Scotland) Imogen Bankier	16–21, 19–21	Bronze	
2013	Tianhe Sports Center, Guangzhou, China	(Indonesia) Tontowi Ahmad	(China) Xu Chen (China) Ma Jin	21–13, 16–21, 22–20	Gold	
2015	Istora Gelora Bung Karno, Jakarta, Indonesia	(Indonesia) Tontowi Ahmad	(China) Zhang Nan (China) Zhao Yunlei	22–20, 21–23, 12–21	Bronze	
2017	Emirates Arena, Glasgow, Scotland	(Indonesia) Tontowi Ahmad	(China) Zheng Siwei (China) Chen Qingchen	15–21, 21–16, 21–15	Gold	

=== World Cup ===
Mixed doubles
Year	Venue	Partner	Opponent	Score	Result
2005	Olympic Park, Yiyang, China	(Indonesia) Nova Widianto	(China) Xie Zhongbo (China) Zhang Yawen	19–21, 10–21	Silver
2006	Olympic Park, Yiyang, China	(Indonesia) Nova Widianto	(China) Xie Zhongbo (China) Zhang Yawen	21–16, 21–18	Gold

=== Asian Games ===
Mixed doubles
Year	Venue	Partner	Opponent	Score	Result
2014	Gyeyang Gymnasium, Incheon, South Korea	(Indonesia) Tontowi Ahmad	(China) Zhang Nan (China) Zhao Yunlei	16–21, 14–21	Silver
2018	Istora Gelora Bung Karno, Jakarta, Indonesia	(Indonesia) Tontowi Ahmad	(China) Zheng Siwei (China) Huang Yaqiong	13–21, 18–21	Bronze

=== Asian Championships ===
Women's doubles
Year	Venue	Partner	Opponent	Score	Result
2008	Bandaraya Stadium, Johor Bahru, Malaysia	(Indonesia) Vita Marissa	(China) Yang Wei (China) Zhang Jiewen	10–21, 10–21	Bronze

Mixed doubles
Year	Venue	Partner	Opponent	Score	Result
2006	Bandaraya Stadium, Johor Bahru, Malaysia	(Indonesia) Nova Widianto	(Thailand) Sudket Prapakamol (Thailand) Saralee Thungthongkam	21–16, 21–23, 21–14	Gold
2008	Bandaraya Stadium, Johor Bahru, Malaysia	(Indonesia) Nova Widianto	(Indonesia) Flandy Limpele (Indonesia) Vita Marissa	17–21, 17–21	Silver
2010	Siri Fort Indoor Stadium, New Delhi, India	(Indonesia) Devin Lahardi Fitriawan	(Malaysia) Chan Peng Soon (Malaysia) Goh Liu Ying	21–12, 19–21, 15–21	Bronze
2015	Wuhan Sports Center Gymnasium, Wuhan, China	(Indonesia) Tontowi Ahmad	(Hong Kong) Lee Chun Hei (Hong Kong) Chau Hoi Wah	21–16, 21–15	Gold
2016	Wuhan Sports Center Gymnasium, Wuhan, China	(Indonesia) Tontowi Ahmad	(China) Zhang Nan (China) Zhao Yunlei	21–16, 9–21, 17–21	Silver
2018	Wuhan Sports Center Gymnasium, Wuhan, China	(Indonesia) Tontowi Ahmad	(China) Wang Yilyu (China) Huang Dongping	17–21, 17–21	Silver

=== SEA Games ===
Women's doubles
Year	Venue	Partner	Opponent	Score	Result
2003	Tan Binh Sport Center, Ho Chi Minh City, Vietnam	(Indonesia) Eny Erlangga	(Indonesia) Jo Novita (Indonesia) Lita Nurlita	13–15, 15–11, 7–15	Silver
2007	Wongchawalitkul University, Nakhon Ratchasima, Thailand	(Indonesia) Vita Marissa	(Indonesia) Jo Novita (Indonesia) Greysia Polii	21–15, 21–14	Gold

Mixed doubles
Year	Venue	Partner	Opponent	Score	Result
2005	PhilSports Arena, Pasig, Philippines	(Indonesia) Nova Widianto	(Indonesia) Anggun Nugroho (Indonesia) Yunita Tetty	15–6, 15–2	Gold
2007	Wongchawalitkul University, Nakhon Ratchasima, Thailand	(Indonesia) Nova Widianto	(Thailand) Sudket Prapakamol (Thailand) Saralee Thungthongkam	21–13, 22–24, 16–21	Bronze
2009	Gym Hall 1, National Sports Complex, Vientiane, Laos	(Indonesia) Nova Widianto	(Thailand) Songphon Anugritayawon (Thailand) Kunchala Voravichitchaikul	21–10, 20–22, 21–9	Gold
2011	Istora Gelora Bung Karno, Jakarta, Indonesia	(Indonesia) Tontowi Ahmad	(Thailand) Sudket Prapakamol (Thailand) Saralee Thungthongkam	21–7, 21–14	Gold

=== World Junior Championships ===
Girls' doubles
Year	Venue	Partner	Opponent	Score	Result
2002	Pretoria Showgrounds, Pretoria, South Africa	(Indonesia) Devi Sukma Wijaya	(China) Du Jing (China) Rong Lu	4–11, 5–11	Bronze

Mixed doubles
Year	Venue	Partner	Opponent	Score	Result
2002	Pretoria Showgrounds, Pretoria, South Africa	(Indonesia) Markis Kido	(China) Cao Chen (China) Rong Lu	4–11, 1–11	Bronze

=== Asian Junior Championships ===
Mixed doubles
Year	Venue	Partner	Opponent	Score	Result
2002	Kuala Lumpur Badminton Stadium, Kuala Lumpur, Malaysia	(Indonesia) Markis Kido	(China) Cao Chen (China) Rong Lu	11–4, 11–3	Gold

=== BWF World Tour (1 title, 3 runners-up) ===
The BWF World Tour, which was announced on 19 March 2017 and implemented in 2018, is a series of elite badminton tournaments sanctioned by the Badminton World Federation (BWF). The BWF World Tour is divided into levels of World Tour Finals, Super 1000, Super 750, Super 500, Super 300 (part of the HSBC World Tour), and the BWF Tour Super 100.

Mixed doubles
Year	Tournament	Level	Partner	Opponent	Score	Result
2018	Indonesia Masters	Super 500	(Indonesia) Tontowi Ahmad	(China) Zheng Siwei (China) Huang Yaqiong	14–21, 11–21	(silver) Runner-up
2018	Indonesia Open	Super 1000	(Indonesia) Tontowi Ahmad	(Malaysia) Chan Peng Soon (Malaysia) Goh Liu Ying	21–17, 21–8	(gold) Winner
2018	Singapore Open	Super 500	(Indonesia) Tontowi Ahmad	(Malaysia) Goh Soon Huat (Malaysia) Shevon Jemie Lai	19–21, 18–21	(silver) Runner-up
2019	Indonesia Masters	Super 500	(Indonesia) Tontowi Ahmad	(China) Zheng Siwei (China) Huang Yaqiong	21–19, 19–21, 16–21	(silver) Runner-up

=== BWF Superseries (23 titles, 19 runners-up) ===
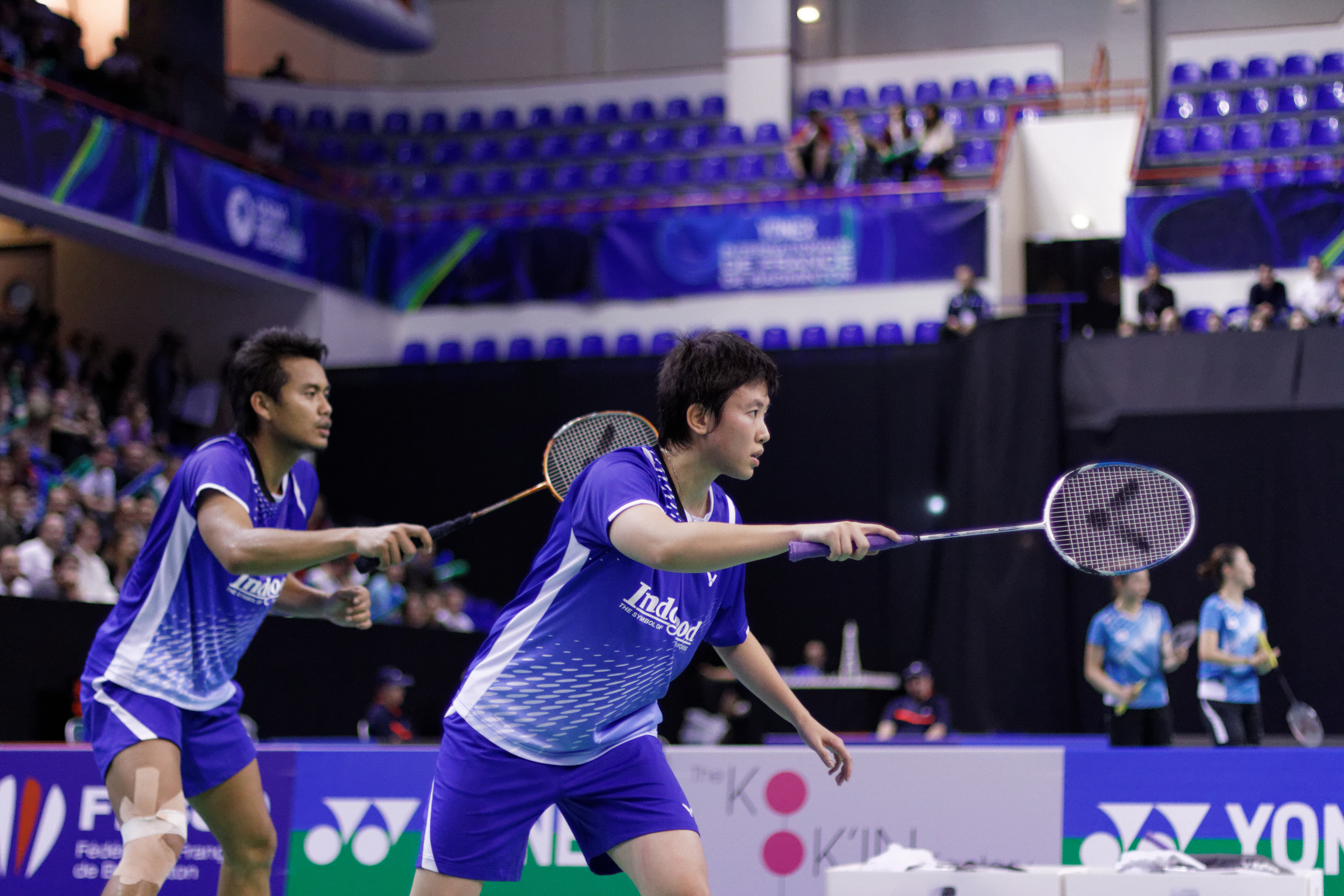
Lilyana Natsir and Tontowi Ahmad at the 2013 French Open Superseries

The BWF Superseries, which was launched on 14 December 2006 and implemented in 2007, was a series of elite badminton tournaments, sanctioned by the Badminton World Federation (BWF). BWF Superseries levels were Superseries and Superseries Premier. A season of Superseries consisted of twelve tournaments around the world that had been introduced since 2011. Successful players were invited to the Superseries Finals, which were held at the end of each year.

Natsir has won many Superseries titles with some partners such as Nova Widianto, Vita Marissa, and Tontowi Ahmad.

Women's doubles
Year	Tournament	Partner	Opponent	Score	Result
2007	China Masters	(Indonesia) Vita Marissa	(China) Yang Wei (China) Zhao Tingting	12–21, 21–15, 21–16	(gold) Winner
2008	Indonesia Open	(Indonesia) Vita Marissa	(Japan) Miyuki Maeda (Japan) Satoko Suetsuna	21–15, 21–14	(gold) Winner
2008	World Superseries Masters Finals	(Indonesia) Vita Marissa	(Malaysia) Chin Eei Hui (Malaysia) Wong Pei Tty	15–21, 20–22	(silver) Runner-up

Mixed doubles
Year	Tournament	Partner	Opponent	Score	Result
2007	Indonesia Open	(Indonesia) Nova Widianto	(China) Zheng Bo (China) Gao Ling	16–21, 11–21	(silver) Runner-up
2007	Japan Open	(Indonesia) Nova Widianto	(China) Zheng Bo (China) Gao Ling	19–21, 14–21	(silver) Runner-up
2007	China Open	(Indonesia) Nova Widianto	(Thailand) Sudket Prapakamol (Thailand) Saralee Thungthongkam	15–21, 21–18, 21–11	(gold) Winner
2007	Hong Kong Open	(Indonesia) Nova Widianto	(China) Zheng Bo (China) Gao Ling	21–23, 21–18, 21–19	(gold) Winner
2008	All England Open	(Indonesia) Nova Widianto	(China) Zheng Bo (China) Gao Ling	21–18, 14–21, 9–21	(silver) Runner-up
2008	Singapore Open	(Indonesia) Nova Widianto	(England) Anthony Clark (England) Donna Kellogg	17–21, 21–14, 21–9	(gold) Winner
2008	Japan Open	(Indonesia) Nova Widianto	(Indonesia) Muhammad Rijal (Indonesia) Vita Marissa	21–14, 15–21, 19–21	(silver) Runner-up
2008	China Masters	(Indonesia) Nova Widianto	(China) Xie Zhongbo (China) Zhang Yawen	17–21, 17–21	(silver) Runner-up
2008	World Superseries Masters Finals	(Indonesia) Nova Widianto	(Denmark) Thomas Laybourn (Denmark) Kamilla Rytter Juhl	19–21, 21–18, 20–22	(silver) Runner-up
2009	Malaysia Open	(Indonesia) Nova Widianto	(South Korea) Lee Yong-dae (South Korea) Lee Hyo-jung	21–14, 21–19	(gold) Winner
2009	French Open	(Indonesia) Nova Widianto	(Indonesia) Hendra Aprida Gunawan (Indonesia) Vita Marissa	21–7, 21–7	(gold) Winner
2009	Hong Kong Open	(Indonesia) Nova Widianto	(Poland) Robert Mateusiak (Poland) Nadieżda Kostiuczyk	20–22, 16–21	(silver) Runner-up
2010	All England Open	(Indonesia) Nova Widianto	(China) Zhang Nan (China) Zhao Yunlei	18–16, 25–23, 18–21	(silver) Runner-Up
2010	Singapore Open	(Indonesia) Nova Widianto	(Denmark) Thomas Laybourn (Denmark) Kamilla Rytter Juhl	12–21, 15–21	(silver) Runner-up
2011	India Open	(Indonesia) Tontowi Ahmad	(Indonesia) Fran Kurniawan (Indonesia) Pia Zebadiah Bernadet	21–18, 23–21	(gold) Winner
2011	Singapore Open	(Indonesia) Tontowi Ahmad	(Chinese Taipei) Chen Hung-ling (Chinese Taipei) Cheng Wen-hsing	21–14, 27–25	(gold) Winner
2011	Indonesia Open	(Indonesia) Tontowi Ahmad	(China) Zhang Nan (China) Zhao Yunlei	22–20, 14–21, 9–21	(silver) Runner-up
2012	All England Open	(Indonesia) Tontowi Ahmad	(Denmark) Thomas Laybourn (Denmark) Kamilla Rytter Juhl	21–17, 21–19	(gold) Winner
2012	India Open	(Indonesia) Tontowi Ahmad	(Thailand) Sudket Prapakamol (Thailand) Saralee Thungthongkam	21–16, 12–21, 21–14	(gold) Winner
2012	Indonesia Open	(Indonesia) Tontowi Ahmad	(Thailand) Sudket Prapakamol (Thailand) Saralee Thungthongkam	17–21, 21–17, 13–21	(silver) Runner-up
2012	Japan Open	(Indonesia) Muhammad Rijal	(Malaysia) Chan Peng Soon (Malaysia) Goh Liu Ying	12–21, 19–21	(silver) Runner-up
2012	Denmark Open	(Indonesia) Tontowi Ahmad	(China) Xu Chen (China) Ma Jin	21–23, 26–24, 11–21	(silver) Runner-up
2013	All England Open	(Indonesia) Tontowi Ahmad	(China) Zhang Nan (China) Zhao Yunlei	21–13, 21–17	(gold) Winner
2013	India Open	(Indonesia) Tontowi Ahmad	(South Korea) Ko Sung-hyun (South Korea) Kim Ha-na	21–16, 21–13	(gold) Winner
2013	Singapore Open	(Indonesia) Tontowi Ahmad	(South Korea) Yoo Yeon-seong (South Korea) Eom Hye-won	21–12, 21–12	(gold) Winner
2013	Denmark Open	(Indonesia) Tontowi Ahmad	(China) Zhang Nan (China) Zhao Yunlei	11–21, 20–22	(silver) Runner-up
2013	China Open	(Indonesia) Tontowi Ahmad	(Denmark) Joachim Fischer Nielsen (Denmark) Christinna Pedersen	21–10, 5–21, 21–17	(gold) Winner
2014	All England Open	(Indonesia) Tontowi Ahmad	(China) Zhang Nan (China) Zhao Yunlei	21–13, 21–17	(gold) Winner
2014	Singapore Open	(Indonesia) Tontowi Ahmad	(Indonesia) Riky Widianto (Indonesia) Puspita Richi Dili	21–15, 22–20	(gold) Winner
2014	Denmark Open	(Indonesia) Tontowi Ahmad	(China) Xu Chen (China) Ma Jin	20–22, 15–21	(silver) Runner-up
2014	French Open	(Indonesia) Tontowi Ahmad	(England) Chris Adcock (England) Gabby Adcock	21–9, 21–16	(gold) Winner
2015	All England Open	(Indonesia) Tontowi Ahmad	(China) Zhang Nan (China) Zhao Yunlei	10–21, 10–21	(silver) Runner-up
2015	Korea Open	(Indonesia) Tontowi Ahmad	(China) Zhang Nan (China) Zhao Yunlei	16–21, 15–21	(silver) Runner-up
2015	Denmark Open	(Indonesia) Tontowi Ahmad	(South Korea) Ko Sung-hyun (South Korea) Kim Ha-na	22–20, 18–21, 9–21	(silver) Runner-up
2016	Malaysia Open	(Indonesia) Tontowi Ahmad	(Malaysia) Chan Peng Soon (Malaysia) Goh Liu Ying	23–21, 13–21, 21–16	(gold) Winner
2016	China Open	(Indonesia) Tontowi Ahmad	(China) Zhang Nan (China) Li Yinhui	21–13, 22–24, 21–16	(gold) Winner
2016	Hong Kong Open	(Indonesia) Tontowi Ahmad	(Indonesia) Praveen Jordan (Indonesia) Debby Susanto	21–19, 21–17	(gold) Winner
2017	Indonesia Open	(Indonesia) Tontowi Ahmad	(China) Zheng Siwei (China) Chen Qingchen	22–20, 21–15	(gold) Winner
2017	French Open	(Indonesia) Tontowi Ahmad	(China) Zheng Siwei (China) Chen Qingchen	22–20, 21–15	(gold) Winner

BWF Super Series Finals tournament
BWF Super Series Premier tournament
BWF Super Series tournament

=== BWF Grand Prix (15 titles, 8 runners-up) ===
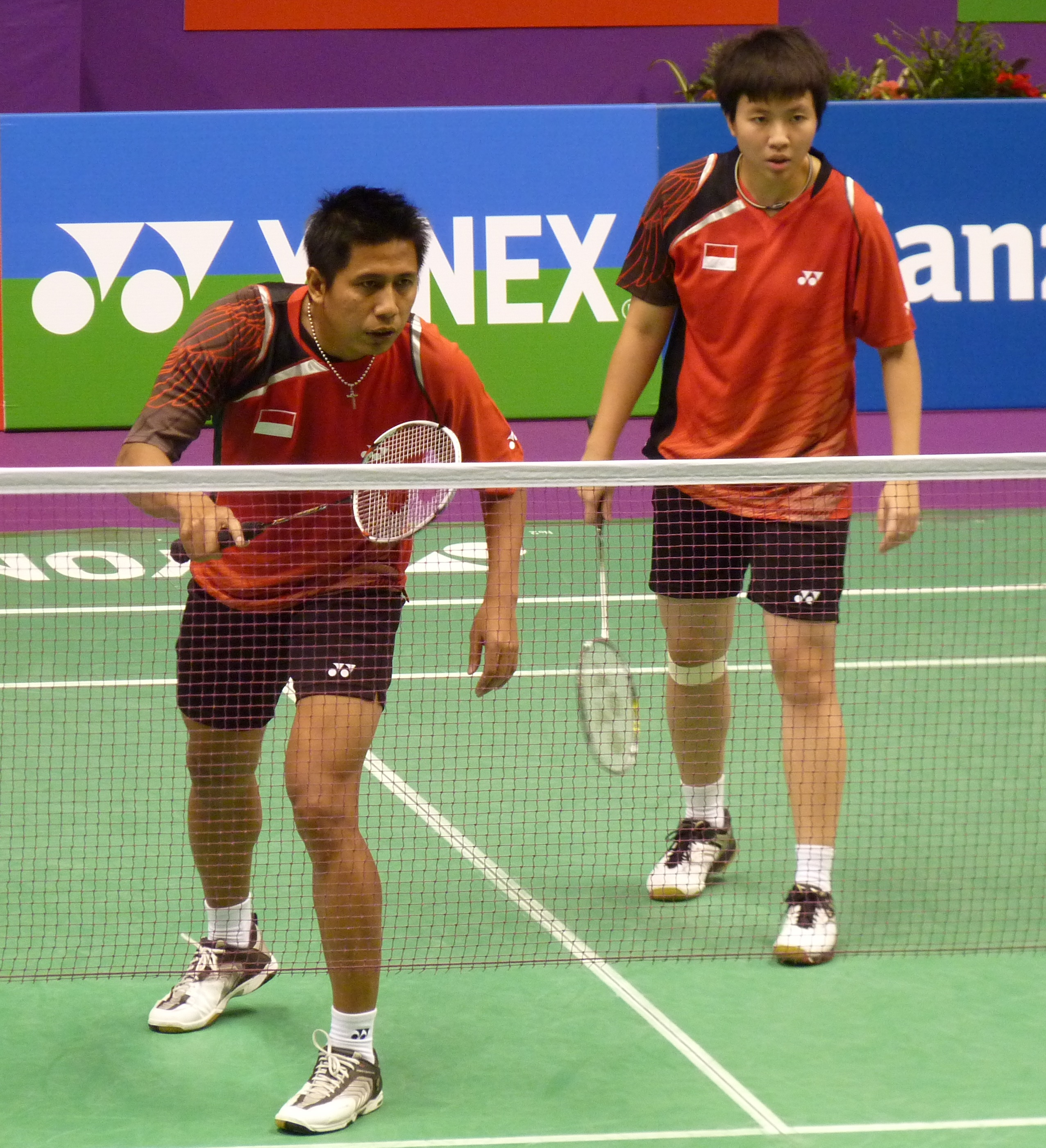
Nova Widianto & Lilyana Natsir

The BWF Grand Prix had two levels, the Grand Prix and Grand Prix Gold. It was a series of badminton tournaments sanctioned by the Badminton World Federation (BWF) and played between 2007 and 2017. The World Badminton Grand Prix was sanctioned by the International Badminton Federation from 1983 to 2006.

Women's doubles
Year	Tournament	Partner	Opponent	Score	Result
2007	Chinese Taipei Open	(Indonesia) Vita Marissa	(Chinese Taipei) Cheng Wen-hsing (Chinese Taipei) Chien Yu-chin	15–21, 21–17, 18–21	(silver) Runner-up

Mixed doubles
Year	Tournament	Partner	Opponent	Score	Result
2004	Singapore Open	(Indonesia) Nova Widianto	(Malaysia) Koo Kien Keat (Malaysia) Wong Pei Tty	15–1, 15–4	(gold) Winner
2005	Swiss Open	(Indonesia) Nova Widianto	(England) Nathan Robertson (England) Gail Emms	14–17, 6–15	(silver) Runner-up
2005	Indonesia Open	(Indonesia) Nova Widianto	(Indonesia) Anggun Nugroho (Indonesia) Yunita Tetty	15–13, 15–1	(gold) Winner
2006	Indonesia Open	(Indonesia) Nova Widianto	(China) Xie Zhongbo (China) Zhang Yawen	19–21, 15–21	(silver) Runner-up
2006	Singapore Open	(Indonesia) Nova Widianto	(England) Nathan Robertson (England) Gail Emms	21–16, 20–22, 23–21	(gold) Winner
2006	Chinese Taipei Open	(Indonesia) Nova Widianto	(South Korea) Lee Jae-jin (South Korea) Lee Hyo-jung	17–21, 23–21, 21–13	(gold) Winner
2006	Korea Open	(Indonesia) Nova Widianto	(Denmark) Jens Eriksen (Denmark) Mette Schjoldager	23–21, 21–18	(gold) Winner
2006	Hong Kong Open	(Indonesia) Nova Widianto	(China) Zheng Bo (China) Zhao Tingting	20–22, 19–21	(silver) Runner-up
2006	Japan Open	(Indonesia) Nova Widianto	(Indonesia) Flandy Limpele (Indonesia) Vita Marissa	21–11, 18–21, 17–21	(silver) Runner-up
2007	Philippines Open	(Indonesia) Nova Widianto	(South Korea) Han Sang-hoon (South Korea) Hwang Yu-mi	21–17, 21–13	(gold) Winner
2010	Malaysia Grand Prix Gold	(Indonesia) Devin Lahardi Fitriawan	(Thailand) Sudket Prapakamol (Thailand) Saralee Thungthongkam	13–21, 21–16, 21–17	(gold) Winner
2010	Macau Open	(Indonesia) Tontowi Ahmad	(Indonesia) Hendra Aprida Gunawan (Indonesia) Vita Marissa	21–14, 21–18	(gold) Winner
2010	Chinese Taipei Open	(Indonesia) Tontowi Ahmad	(Indonesia) Hendra Aprida Gunawan (Indonesia) Vita Marissa	20–22, 21–14, 20–22	(silver) Runner-up
2010	Indonesia Grand Prix Gold	(Indonesia) Tontowi Ahmad	(Indonesia) Markis Kido (Indonesia) Lita Nurlita	21–11, 21–13	(gold) Winner
2011	Malaysia Grand Prix Gold	(Indonesia) Tontowi Ahmad	(Malaysia) Chan Peng Soon (Malaysia) Goh Liu Ying	18–21, 21–15, 21–19	(gold) Winner
2011	Chinese Taipei Open	(Indonesia) Tontowi Ahmad	(South Korea) Ko Sung-hyun (South Korea) Eom Hye-won	22–24, 21–16, 17–21	(silver) Runner-up
2011	Macau Open	(Indonesia) Tontowi Ahmad	(Chinese Taipei) Chen Hung-ling (Chinese Taipei) Cheng Wen-hsing	Walkover	(gold) Winner
2012	Swiss Open	(Indonesia) Tontowi Ahmad	(Thailand) Sudket Prapakamol (Thailand) Saralee Thungthongkam	21–16, 21–14	(gold) Winner
2012	Indonesia Grand Prix Gold	(Indonesia) Tontowi Ahmad	(Indonesia) Muhammad Rijal (Indonesia) Debby Susanto	21–19, 21–14	(gold) Winner
2012	Macau Open	(Indonesia) Tontowi Ahmad	(Indonesia) Muhammad Rijal (Indonesia) Debby Susanto	21–16, 14–21, 21–16	(gold) Winner
2013	Indonesia Grand Prix Gold	(Indonesia) Tontowi Ahmad	(Indonesia) Praveen Jordan (Indonesia) Vita Marissa	20–22, 21–9, 14–21	(silver) Runner-up
2015	Indonesian Masters	(Indonesia) Tontowi Ahmad	(Indonesia) Praveen Jordan (Indonesia) Debby Susanto	21–18, 21–13	(gold) Winner

BWF Grand Prix Gold tournament
BWF Grand Prix tournament

=== Invitational tournament ===
Mixed doubles
Year	Tournament	Partner	Opponent	Score	Result	Ref.
2014	Glory to the King	(Indonesia) Tontowi Ahmad	(Thailand) Songphon Anugritayawon (Thailand) Kunchala Voravichitchaikul	21–13, 17–21, 21–17	(gold) Winner	

== Participation on Indonesian team ==
- 5 times at Sudirman Cup (2003, 2005, 2007, 2009, 2011, 2013)
- 3 times at Uber Cup (2004, 2008, 2010)

== Performance timeline ==
Key

W	Won	F	Finalist	SF	Semi-finalist
QF	Quarter-finalist	#R	Rounds 4, 3, 2, 1	RR	Round-robin stage
Q#	Qualification round	A	Absent	w/d	Withdrew
G	Gold	S	Silver	B	Bronze
NH	Not held	N/A	Not applicable	DNQ	Did not qualify

=== National team ===
- Junior level

Team events	2001	2002
Asian Junior Championships	B	w/d
World Junior Championships	N/A	B

- Senior level

Team events	2003	2004	2005	2006	2007	2008	2009	2010	2011	2012	2013	2014	2015	2016	2017	2018
SEA Games	B	NH	B	NH	G	NH	S	NH	S	NH			A	NH	A	NH
Asian Games	NH			R	NH			B	NH			QF	NH			B
Uber Cup	NH	DF	NH	DNQ	NH	S	NH	B	NH	A	NH	A	NH	A	NH	A
Sudirman Cup	B	NH	S	NH	S	NH	B	NH	B	NH	QF	NH	B	NH	A	NH

=== Individual competitions ===
==== Junior level ====
In the junior international tournaments, Natsir won a gold in the mixed doubles at the Asian Junior Championships, and two bronze medals in the girls' doubles and mixed doubles at the World Junior Championships.

Girls' doubles

Events	2001	2002	Ref
Asian Junior Championships			
World Junior Championships	NH	B	

Mixed doubles

Events	2001	2002	Ref
Asian Junior Championships		G	
World Junior Championships	NH	B	

==== Senior level ====
Women's doubles

Events	2003	2004	2005	2006	2007	2008
SEA Games	S	NH	A	NH	G	NH
Asian Championships		2R	A			B
World Championships	2R	NH	A			NH
Olympic Games	NH	DNQ	NH			1R

Tournament	IBF Grand Prix						BWF Superseries / Grand Prix			Best
Tournament	2001	2002	2003	2004	2005	2006	2007	2008	2009	Best
All England Open	A		2R	2R	A			2R	A	2R ('03, '04, '08)
Malaysia Open	A		1R	QF	A			2R	QF	QF ('04, '09)
Indonesia Open	1R	1R	2R	A				W	A	W ('08)
Singapore Open	A		1R	A				SF	A	SF ('08)
Thailand Open	A		NH	1R	A					1R ('04)
China Open	A						QF	A		QF ('07)
Denmark Open	A		1R	w/d	A		2R	A		2R ('07)
French Open	N/A					NH	2R	QF	A	QF ('08)
China Masters	NH				A		W	2R	A	W ('07)
Swiss Open	A			1R	A			2R	A	2R ('08)
German Open	A		1R	A						1R ('03)
Korea Open	A		2R	1R	A			QF	A	QF ('08)
Chinese Taipei Open	NH	A	1R	A			F	A		F ('07)
Japan Open	A		1R	2R	A		2R	SF	A	SF ('08)
Macau Open	NH	N/A	NH			A	w/d	A		–
Hong Kong Open	A	NH	1R	NH	A			QF	A	QF ('08)
Superseries Finals	NH							F	DNQ	F ('08)
Year-end ranking									72	4
Tournament	2001	2002	2003	2004	2005	2006	2007	2008	2009	Best

Mixed doubles

Events	2003	2004	2005	2006	2007	2008	2009	2010	2011	2012	2013	2014	2015	2016	2017	2018
SEA Games	QF	NH	G	NH	B	NH	G	NH	G	NH	A	NH	A	NH	A	NH
Asian Championships		A		G	A	S	A	B	A				G	S	w/d	S
Asian Games	NH			QF	NH			2R	NH			S	NH			B
World Cup	NH				S	G	NH									
World Championships	A	NH	G	3R	G	NH	S	QF	B	NH	G	A	B	NH	G	A
Olympic Games	NH	DNQ	NH			S	NH			4th	NH			G	NH	

Tournament	IBF Grand Prix					BWF Superseries / Grand Prix											BWF World Tour		Best
Tournament	2002	2003	2004	2005	2006	2007	2008	2009	2010	2011	2012	2013	2014	2015	2016	2017	2018	2019	Best
Indonesia Masters	NH								W	2R	W	F	A	W	A	NH	F	F	W ('10, '12, '15)
All England Open	A			SF	SF	QF	F	QF	F	2R	W	W	W	F	QF	QF	2R	Ret.	W ('12, '13, '14)
Malaysia Open	A			QF	A	SF	QF	W	1R	1R	SF	A	SF	SF	W	SF	QF	Ret.	W ('09, '16)
Indonesia Open	1R	A		W	F	F	SF	QF	SF	F	F	SF	SF	SF	2R	W	W	Ret.	W ('05, '08, '17, '18)
Singapore Open	A		W	QF	W	SF	W	SF	F	W	w/d	W	W	SF	SF	1R	F	Ret.	W ('04, '06, '08, '11, '13, '14)
China Open	A		SF	QF	A	W	A	QF	A	2R	SF	W	QF	1R	W	QF	2R	Ret.	W ('07, '13, '16)
Denmark Open	A					1R	A	QF	A	1R	F	F	F	F	2R	SF	SF	Ret.	F ('12, '13, '14, '15)
French Open	N/A				NH	QF	SF	W	A	SF	QF	QF	W	1R	A	W	QF	Ret.	W ('09, '14, '17)
China Masters	NH			A		SF	F	A	SF	A							QF	Ret.	F ('08)
Malaysia Masters	NH							A	W	W	A				1R	SF	A	Ret.	W ('10, '11)
Australian Open	N/A							A					w/d	SF	1R	1R	A	Ret.	SF ('15)
India Open	NH						A			W	W	W	SF	A				Ret.	W ('11, '12, '13)
Swiss Open	A			F	A		SF	QF	A	SF	W	SF	A	SF	A	2R	A	Ret.	W ('12)
Korea Open	A			SF	W	2R	1R	2R	A	QF	QF	QF	A	F	A			Ret.	W ('06)
Chinese Taipei Open	A				W	SF	A	QF	F	F	A							Ret.	W ('06)
Japan Open	A			QF	F	F	F	SF	2R	2R	F	A		QF	A	w/d	A	Ret.	F ('06, '07, '08, '12)
Macau Open	N/A	NH			A				W	W	W	A						Ret.	W ('10, '11, '12)
Hong Kong Open	NH	A	NH	QF	F	W	QF	F	2R	A			2R	w/d	W	w/d	A	Ret.	W ('07, '16)
Philippines Open	NH				A	W	NH	A	NH									Ret.	W ('07)
Superseries / World Tour Finals	NH						F	DNQ		RR	RR	RR	RR	RR	w/d	SF	DNQ	Ret.	F ('08)
Year-end ranking							1	2	13	4	2	2	3	2	3	3	4	—N/a	1
Tournament	2002	2003	2004	2005	2006	2007	2008	2009	2010	2011	2012	2013	2014	2015	2016	2017	2018	2019	Best

|}

== Personal life ==
Natsir is a daughter of Beno Natsir (father) and Olly Maramis (mother).
