= 2009 All England Super Series – Women's doubles =

This article list the results of women's doubles category in the 2009 All England Super Series of badminton.

== Seeds ==
1. (Chinese Taipei) Cheng Wen-Hsing and Chien Yu-chin
2. (Malaysia) Chin Eei Hui and Wong Pei Tty
3. (South Korea) Lee Hyo-jung and Lee Kyung-won
4. (China) Du Jing and Yu Yang
5. (South Korea) Ha Jung-eun and Kim Min-jung
6. (Denmark) Lena Frier Kristiansen and Kamilla Rytter Juhl
7. (China) Zhang Yawen and Zhao Tingting
8. (Indonesia) Shendy Puspa Irawati and Meiliana Jauhari

== Draws ==
=== Finals ===
Semifinals
(China) Cheng Shu (China) Zhao Yunlei	21	21	21
5	(South Korea) Ha Jung-eun (South Korea) Kim Min-jung	23	15	17
4	(China) Du Jing (China) Yu Yang	21	16	16
7	(China) Zhang Yawen (China) Zhao Tingting	16	21	21

Final
(China) Cheng Shu (China) Zhao Yunlei	13	15
7	(China) Zhang Yawen (China) Zhao Tingting	21	21

=== Top Half ===
First Round
1	(Chinese Taipei) Cheng Wen-Hsing (Chinese Taipei) Chien Yu-chin	19	21	21
(Indonesia) Nitya Krishinda Maheswari (Indonesia) Greysia Polii	21	16	15
(England) Heather Olver (England) Samantha Ward	12	8
(Japan) Mizuki Fujii (Japan) Reika Kakiiwa	21	21
8	(Indonesia) Shendy Puspa Irawati (Indonesia) Meiliana Jauhari	15	18
(China) Cheng Shu (China) Zhao Yunlei	21	21
(Sweden) Emelie Lennartsson (Sweden) Emma Wengberg	15	19
(Thailand) Duanganong Aroonkesorn (Thailand) Kunchala Voravichitchaikul	21	21
3	(South Korea) Lee Hyo-jung (South Korea) Lee Kyung-won	21	21
(Macau) Zhang Dan (Macau) Zhang Zhibo	18	11
PFQ	(Malaysia) Ang Li Peng (England) Suzanne Rayappan	10	14
(Russia) Ekaterina Ananina (Russia) Anastasia Russkikh	21	21
5	(South Korea) Ha Jung-eun (South Korea) Kim Min-jung	22	21
(Singapore) Frances Liu (Singapore) Vanessa Neo	20	19
(India) Jwala Gutta (India) Shruti Kurian	9	21	18
(Malaysia) Haw Chiou Hwee (Malaysia) Lim Pek Siah	21	19	21

Second Round
1	(Chinese Taipei) Cheng Wen-Hsing (Chinese Taipei) Chien Yu-chin	21	21
(Japan) Mizuki Fujii (Japan) Reika Kakiiwa	18	16
(China) Cheng Shu (China) Zhao Yunlei	21	21
(Thailand) Duanganong Aroonkesorn (Thailand) Kunchala Voravichitchaikul	10	6
3	(South Korea) Lee Hyo-jung (South Korea) Lee Kyung-won	21	21
(Russia) Ekaterina Ananina (Russia) Anastasia Russkikh	18	9
5	(South Korea) Ha Jung-eun (South Korea) Kim Min-jung	21	21
(Malaysia) Haw Chiou Hwee (Malaysia) Lim Pek Siah	4	13

Quarterfinals
1	(Chinese Taipei) Cheng Wen-Hsing (Chinese Taipei) Chien Yu Chin	21	15	18
(China) Cheng Shu (China) Zhao Yunlei	19	21	21
3	(South Korea) Lee Hyo-jung (South Korea) Lee Kyung-won Ret.
5	(South Korea) Ha Jung-eun (South Korea) Kim Min-jung

Semifinals
(China) Cheng Shu (China) Zhao Yunlei	21	21	21
5	(South Korea) Ha Jung-eun (South Korea) Kim Min-jung	23	15	17

=== Bottom Half ===
First Round
(Malaysia) Goh Liu Ying (Malaysia) Ng Hui Lin	21	17	20
(England) Jenny Wallwork (England) Gabrielle White	19	21	22
(Singapore) Shinta Mulia Sari (Singapore) Yao Lei	21	18	19
6	(Denmark) Lena Frier Kristiansen (Denmark) Kamilla Rytter Juhl	16	21	21
PFQ	(England) Sarah Bok (Scotland) Jillie Cooper	17	16
(France) Laura Choinet (France) Weny Rahmawati	21	21
Q	(England) Nicola Cerfontyne (England) Rachel Howard	7	7
4	(China) Du Jing (China) Yu Yang	21	21
Q	(Chinese Taipei) Chen Hsiao-Huan (Chinese Taipei) Cheng Shao-chieh	18	21	13
PFQ	(South Korea) Jang Ye-na (South Korea) Kim Mi-young	21	19	21
Q	(Germany) Annekatrin Lillie (Germany) Birgit Overzier	9	17
7	(China) Zhang Yawen (China) Zhao Tingting	21	21
(China) Pan Pan (China) Tian Qing	21	21
PFQ	(England) Mariana Agathangelou (Scotland) Imogen Bankier	17	16
Q	(Denmark) Line Damkjær Kruse (Denmark) Mie Schjött-Kristensen	9	13
2	(Malaysia) Chin Eei Hui (Malaysia) Wong Pei Tty	21	21

Second Round
(England) Jenny Wallwork (England) Gabrielle White	21	21
6	(Denmark) Lena Frier Kristiansen (Denmark) Kamilla Rytter Juhl	12	8
(France) Laura Choinet (France) Weny Rahmawati	11	13
4	(China) Du Jing (China) Yu Yang	21	21
PFQ	(South Korea) Jang Ye-na (South Korea) Kim Mi-young	15	12
7	(China) Zhang Yawen (China) Zhao Tingting	21	21
(China) Pan Pan (China) Tian Qing	21	21
2	(Malaysia) Chin Eei Hui (Malaysia) Wong Pei Tty	16	9

Quarterfinals
(England) Jenny Wallwork (England) Gabrielle White	6	8
4	(China) Du Jing (China) Yu Yang	21	21
7	(China) Zhang Yawen (China) Zhao Tingting	21	21
(China) Pan Pan (China) Tian Qing	17	18

Semifinals
4	(China) Du Jing (China) Yu Yang	21	16	16
7	(China) Zhang Yawen (China) Zhao Tingting	16	21	21

== Sources ==
Yonex All England Open Super Series 2009 - Women's doubles
