= 1994 Indonesia Open (badminton) =

Tournament details
- Dates: 8–14 August
- Edition: 13th
- Total prize money: US$166,000
- Venue: GOR Among Rogo
- Location: Yogyakarta, Indonesia

Champions
- Men's singles: (Indonesia) Ardy Wiranata
- Women's singles: (Indonesia) Susi Susanti
- Men's doubles: (Indonesia) Ricky Subagja (Indonesia) Rexy Mainaky
- Women's doubles: (Indonesia) Finarsih (Indonesia) Lili Tampi
- Mixed doubles: (China) Jiang Xin (China) Zhang Jin

The 1994 Indonesia Open in badminton was held in Yogyakarta, from August 8 to August 14, 1994. It was a five-star tournament and the prize money was US$166,000.

== Venue ==
- GOR Among Rogo

== Final results ==
Category	Winners	Runners-up	Score
Men's singles	(Indonesia) Ardy Wiranata	(Indonesia) Joko Suprianto	15–9, 15–8
Women's singles	(Indonesia) Susi Susanti	(South Korea) Bang Soo-hyun	2–11, 11–0, 11–7
Men's doubles	(Indonesia) Ricky Subagja & Rexy Mainaky	(Indonesia) Rudy Gunawan & Bambang Suprianto	10–15, 15–4, 18–17
Women's doubles	(Indonesia) Finarsih & Lili Tampi	(South Korea) Chung So-young & Gil Young-ah	15–10, 9–15, 17–15
Mixed doubles	(China) Jiang Xin & Zhang Jin	(Indonesia) Flandy Limpele & Dede Hasanah	15–3, 15–11

=== Men's singles ===
Quarterfinals
(Indonesia) Ardy Wiranata	15	15
(South Korea) Kim Hak-kyun	12	1
(Indonesia) Heryanto Arbi	15	15
(Indonesia) Hendrawan	9	2
(Indonesia) Allan Budi Kusuma	15	4	14
(Indonesia) Joko Suprianto	9	15	18
(Chinese Taipei) Fung Permadi	15	15
(Thailand) Sompol Kukasemkij	4	4

Semifinals
(Indonesia) Ardy Wiranata	4	15	15
(Indonesia) Heryanto Arbi	15	4	5
(Indonesia) Joko Suprianto	15	15
(Chinese Taipei) Fung Permadi	12	4

Finals
(Indonesia) Ardy Wiranata	15	15
(Indonesia) Joko Suprianto	9	8

=== Women's singles ===
Quarterfinals
(Indonesia) Susi Susanti	11	11
(Indonesia) Ika Heny	6	6
(China) Tang Jiuhong	11	5	8
(Indonesia) Yuni Kartika	6	11	11
(Indonesia) Yuliani Santosa	11	11
(Sweden) Lim Xiaoqing	7	8
(South Korea) Bang Soo-hyun	11	11
(Indonesia) Mia Audina	8	8

Semifinals
(Indonesia) Susi Susanti	11	11
(Indonesia) Yuni Kartika	8	2
(Indonesia) Yuliani Santosa	2	7
(South Korea) Bang Soo-hyun	11	11

Finals
(Indonesia) Susi Susanti	2	11	11
(South Korea) Bang Soo-hyun	11	0	7

Preceded by 1993 Indonesia Open	Indonesia Open	Succeeded by 1995 Indonesia Open
