= 2009 All England Super Series =

Badminton championships

Tournament details
- Dates: 3 March 2009– 8 March 2009
- Edition: 99th
- Total prize money: US$200,000
- Venue: National Indoor Arena
- Location: Birmingham, England

The 2009 All England Super Series is the 99th edition of the All England Open Badminton Championships and also the third tournament of the 2009 BWF Super Series. It was held from 3–8 March 2009 in Birmingham, England.

== Final results ==
Category	Winners	Runners-up	Score
Men's singles	(China) Lin Dan	(Malaysia) Lee Chong Wei	21–19, 21–12
Women's singles	(China) Wang Yihan	(Denmark) Tine Rasmussen	21–19, 21–23, 21–11
Men's doubles	(China) Cai Yun & Fu Haifeng	(South Korea) Han Sang-hoon & Hwang Ji-man	21–17, 21–15
Women's doubles	(China) Zhang Yawen & Zhao Tingting	(China) Cheng Shu & Zhao Yunlei	21–13, 21–15
Mixed doubles	(China) He Hanbin & Yu Yang	(South Korea) Ko Sung-hyun & Ha Jung-eun	13–21, 21–15, 21–9
