= Ko Sung-hyun =

South Korean badminton player (born 1987)

고성현 Ko Sung-hyun
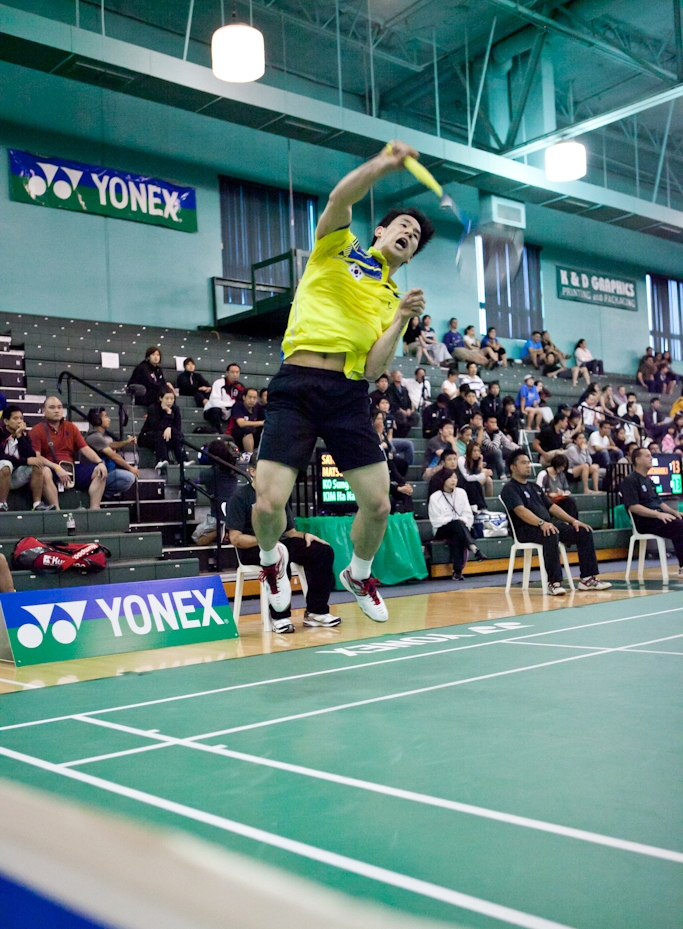

Personal information
- Born: 21 May 1987 (age 39) Goesan-gun, Chungbuk, South Korea
- Height: 1.82 m (6 ft 0 in)
- Weight: 85 kg (187 lb)

Sport
- Country: South Korea
- Sport: Badminton
- Handedness: Right

Men's & mixed doubles
- Highest ranking: 1 (MD with Lee Yong-dae 30 May 2013); 1 (XD with Kim Ha-na 22 September 2016)
- Current ranking: 76 (MD with Shin Baek-cheol), 16 (XD with Eom Hye-won) (29 November 2022)
- BWF profile
Medal record
Men's badminton
Representing South Korea
World Championships
Gold medal – first place	2014 Copenhagen	Men's doubles
Silver medal – second place	2011 London	Men's doubles
Bronze medal – third place	2010 Paris	Mixed doubles
Sudirman Cup
Silver medal – second place	2013 Kuala Lumpur	Mixed team
Bronze medal – third place	2011 Qingdao	Mixed team
Bronze medal – third place	2015 Dongguan	Mixed team
Thomas Cup
Silver medal – second place	2012 Wuhan	Men's team
Bronze medal – third place	2016 Kunshan	Men's team
Asian Games
Gold medal – first place	2014 Incheon	Men's team
Silver medal – second place	2010 Guangzhou	Men's team
Asian Championships
Gold medal – first place	2013 Taipei	Men's doubles
Gold medal – first place	2013 Taipei	Mixed doubles
Silver medal – second place	2009 Suwon	Men's doubles
Bronze medal – third place	2016 Wuhan	Mixed doubles
Asia Team Championships
Bronze medal – third place	2016 Hyderabad	Men's team
Summer Universiade
Gold medal – first place	2013 Kazan	Men's doubles
Gold medal – first place	2013 Kazan	Mixed team
Gold medal – first place	2015 Gwangju	Mixed team

- Ko Sung-hyun
- Hangul: 고성현
- Hanja: 高成炫
- RR: Go Seonghyeon
- MR: Ko Sŏnghyŏn

Ko Sung-hyun (Korean: 고성현; Korean pronunciation: [ko.sʌŋ.ɦjʌŋ]; born 21 May 1987) is a South Korean badminton player affiliated with Gimcheon City Hall. He is a former world number 1 both in the men's and mixed doubles. Ko is a BWF World Champion, two time Badminton Asian Champion, and Asian Games gold medalist.

Ko started to get the attention of the World and Korean badminton when he won the bronze medal at the 2010 World Championships partnered with Ha Jung-eun. Competed in the men's doubles with Yoo Yeon-seong, Ko have achieved several milestones, including won the silver medals at the 2009 Asian and 2011 World Championships, reached a career high as world number 2 at the BWF world ranking. Ko and Yoo ended their partnerships after participating in 2012 London Olympics. Ko then topped the men's doubles BWF world ranking partnered with Lee Yong-dae in May 2013. Ko and Lee were a gold medalists at the 2013 Asian Championships and Summer Universiade.

Teamed-up with Shin Baek-cheol, Ko won the gold medal at the 2014 World Championships. Together with Kim Ha-na, Ko clinched the 2013 Asian Championships title and won his first Superseries title in the mixed doubles at the 2014 Australian Open. Ko and Kim participated at the 2016 Rio Olympics, reaching in to the quarter finals stage, and occupied the mixed doubles world number 1 in September 2016.

== Achievements ==
=== BWF World Championships ===
Men's doubles
Year	Venue	Partner	Opponent	Score	Result
2011	Wembley Arena, London, England	(South Korea) Yoo Yeon-seong	(China) Cai Yun (China) Fu Haifeng	22–24, 16–21	Silver
2014	Ballerup Super Arena, Copenhagen, Denmark	(South Korea) Shin Baek-cheol	(South Korea) Lee Yong-dae (South Korea) Yoo Yeon-seong	22–20, 21–23, 21–18	Gold

Mixed doubles
Year	Venue	Partner	Opponent	Score	Result
2010	Stade Pierre de Coubertin, Paris, France	(South Korea) Ha Jung-eun	(China) Zheng Bo (China) Ma Jin	21–15, 11–21, 16–21	Bronze

=== Asian Championships ===
Men's doubles
Year	Venue	Partner	Opponent	Score	Result
2009	Suwon Indoor Stadium, Suwon, South Korea	(South Korea) Yoo Yeon-seong	(Indonesia) Markis Kido (Indonesia) Hendra Setiawan	18–21, 24–26	Silver
2013	Taipei Arena, Taipei, Taiwan	(South Korea) Lee Yong-dae	(South Korea) Kim Gi-jung (South Korea) Kim Sa-rang	21–13, 22–20	Gold

Mixed doubles
Year	Venue	Partner	Opponent	Score	Result
2013	Taipei Arena, Taipei, Taiwan	(South Korea) Kim Ha-na	(China) Zhang Nan (China) Zhao Yunlei	22–20, 21–17	Gold
2016	Wuhan Sports Center Gymnasium, Wuhan, China	(South Korea) Kim Ha-na	(China) Zhang Nan (China) Zhao Yunlei	19–21, 11–21	Bronze

=== Summer Universiade ===
Men's doubles
Year	Venue	Partner	Opponent	Score	Result
2013	Tennis Academy, Kazan, Russia	(South Korea) Lee Yong-dae	(Russia) Vladimir Ivanov (Russia) Ivan Sozonov	13–21, 21–13, 21–13	Gold

=== BWF World Tour (7 titles, 3 runners-up) ===
The BWF World Tour, which was announced on 19 March 2017 and implemented in 2018, is a series of elite badminton tournaments sanctioned by the Badminton World Federation (BWF). The BWF World Tour is divided into levels of World Tour Finals, Super 1000, Super 750, Super 500, Super 300 (part of the HSBC World Tour), and the BWF Tour Super 100.

Men's doubles
Year	Tournament	Level	Partner	Opponent	Score	Result
2018	Vietnam Open	Super 100	(South Korea) Shin Baek-cheol	(Chinese Taipei) Lee Sheng-mu (Chinese Taipei) Yang Po-hsuan	22–20, 21–18	(gold) Winner
2018	Indonesia Masters	Super 100	(South Korea) Shin Baek-cheol	(Chinese Taipei) Chang Ko-chi (Chinese Taipei) Lu Chia-pin	21–23, 13–21	(silver) Runner-up
2018	Macau Open	Super 300	(South Korea) Shin Baek-cheol	(South Korea) Kim Gi-jung (South Korea) Lee Yong-dae	21–17, 13–21, 19–21	(silver) Runner-up
2019	Australian Open	Super 300	(South Korea) Shin Baek-cheol	(Japan) Takeshi Kamura (Japan) Keigo Sonoda	21–11, 21–17	(gold) Winner
2019	U.S. Open	Super 300	(South Korea) Shin Baek-cheol	(Chinese Taipei) Lee Yang (Chinese Taipei) Wang Chi-lin	21–13, 17–21, 6–3 retired	(gold) Winner
2021	French Open	Super 750	(South Korea) Shin Baek-cheol	(Indonesia) Marcus Fernaldi Gideon (Indonesia) Kevin Sanjaya Sukamuljo	21–17, 22–20	(gold) Winner

Mixed doubles
Year	Tournament	Level	Partner	Opponent	Score	Result
2018	Korea Masters	Super 300	(South Korea) Eom Hye-won	(South Korea) Choi Sol-gyu (South Korea) Shin Seung-chan	21–12, 15–21, 21–18	(gold) Winner
2019	Canada Open	Super 100	(South Korea) Eom Hye-won	(China) Guo Xinwa (China) Zhang Shuxian	21–19, 21–19	(gold) Winner
2019	Akita Masters	Super 100	(South Korea) Eom Hye-won	(Japan) Kyohei Yamashita (Japan) Naru Shinoya	21–10, 21–17	(gold) Winner
2022	Korea Open	Super 500	(South Korea) Eom Hye-won	(Malaysia) Tan Kian Meng (Malaysia) Lai Pei Jing	15–21, 18–21	(silver) Runner-up

=== BWF Superseries (11 titles, 16 runners-up) ===
The BWF Superseries, which was launched on 14 December 2006 and implemented in 2007, was a series of elite badminton tournaments, sanctioned by the Badminton World Federation (BWF). BWF Superseries levels were Superseries and Superseries Premier. A season of Superseries consisted of twelve tournaments around the world that had been introduced since 2011. Successful players were invited to the Superseries Finals, which were held at the end of each year.

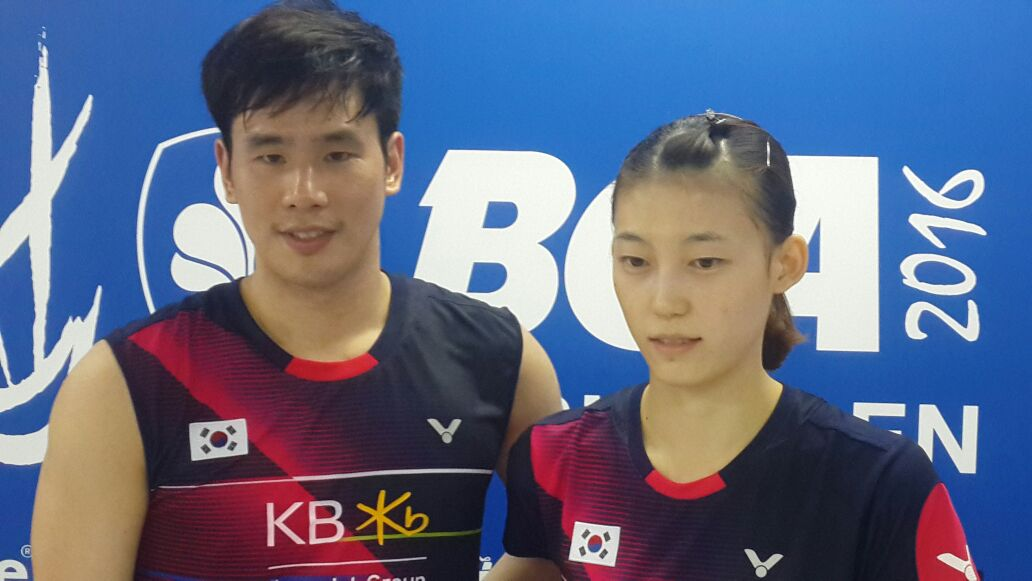
Ko (left) with his partner in the mixed doubles Kim Ha-na.

Men's doubles
Year	Tournament	Partner	Opponent	Score	Result
2010	Swiss Open	(South Korea) Yoo Yeon-seong	(Malaysia) Koo Kien Keat (Malaysia) Tan Boon Heong	21–18, 21–16	(gold) Winner
2010	China Masters	(South Korea) Yoo Yeon-seong	(China) Cai Yun (China) Fu Haifeng	14–21, 19–21	(silver) Runner-up
2010	Hong Kong Open	(South Korea) Yoo Yeon-seong	(Indonesia) Markis Kido (Indonesia) Hendra Setiawan	21–19, 14–21, 23–21	(gold) Winner
2011	China Open	(South Korea) Yoo Yeon-seong	(Denmark) Mathias Boe (Denmark) Carsten Mogensen	17–21, 13–21	(silver) Runner-up
2012	India Open	(South Korea) Yoo Yeon-seong	(Thailand) Bodin Isara (Thailand) Maneepong Jongjit	17–21, 21–14, 14–21	(silver) Runner-up
2012	Singapore Open	(South Korea) Yoo Yeon-seong	(Indonesia) Markis Kido (Indonesia) Hendra Setiawan	20–22, 21–11, 6–21	(silver) Runner-up
2012	French Open	(South Korea) Lee Yong-dae	(Thailand) Bodin Isara (Thailand) Maneepong Jongjit	22–24, 21–17, 21–11	(gold) Winner
2012	China Open	(South Korea) Lee Yong-dae	(Denmark) Mathias Boe (Denmark) Carsten Mogensen	15–21, 14–21	(silver) Runner-up
2013	Korea Open	(South Korea) Lee Yong-dae	(Denmark) Mathias Boe (Denmark) Carsten Mogensen	19–21, 21–13, 21–10	(gold) Winner
2013	India Open	(South Korea) Lee Yong-dae	(China) Liu Xiaolong (China) Qiu Zihan	20–22, 18–21	(silver) Runner-up
2013	Indonesia Open	(South Korea) Lee Yong-dae	(Indonesia) Mohammad Ahsan (Indonesia) Hendra Setiawan	14–21, 18–21	(silver) Runner-up
2013	Singapore Open	(South Korea) Lee Yong-dae	(Indonesia) Mohammad Ahsan (Indonesia) Hendra Setiawan	15–21, 18–21	(silver) Runner-up
2013	China Masters	(South Korea) Lee Yong-dae	(Japan) Hiroyuki Endo (Japan) Kenichi Hayakawa	25–23, 21–19	(gold) Winner
2015	Indonesia Open	(South Korea) Shin Baek-cheol	(China) Fu Haifeng (China) Zhang Nan	21–16, 16–21, 21–19	(gold) Winner
2016	Japan Open	(South Korea) Kim Gi-jung	(China) Li Junhui (China) Liu Yuchen	12–21, 12–21	(silver) Runner-up

Mixed doubles
Year	Tournament	Partner	Opponent	Score	Result
2009	All England Open	(South Korea) Ha Jung-eun	(China) He Hanbin (China) Yu Yang	21–13, 15–21, 9–21	(silver) Runner-up
2013	India Open	(South Korea) Kim Ha-na	(Indonesia) Tontowi Ahmad (Indonesia) Liliyana Natsir	16–21, 13–21	(silver) Runner-up
2014	India Open	(South Korea) Kim Ha-na	(Denmark) Joachim Fischer Nielsen (Denmark) Christinna Pedersen	16–21, 21–18, 18–21	(silver) Runner-up
2014	Australian Open	(South Korea) Kim Ha-na	(Germany) Michael Fuchs (Germany) Birgit Michels	21–16, 21–17	(gold) Winner
2015	Denmark Open	(South Korea) Kim Ha-na	(Indonesia) Tontowi Ahmad (Indonesia) Liliyana Natsir	20–22, 21–18, 21–9	(gold) Winner
2015	French Open	(South Korea) Kim Ha-na	(Indonesia) Praveen Jordan (Indonesia) Debby Susanto	21–10, 15–21, 21–19	(gold) Winner
2015	Dubai World Superseries Finals	(South Korea) Kim Ha-na	(England) Chris Adcock (England) Gabby Adcock	14–21, 17–21	(silver) Runner-up
2016	Singapore Open	(South Korea) Kim Ha-na	(China) Xu Chen (China) Ma Jin	21–17, 21–14	(gold) Winner
2016	Indonesia Open	(South Korea) Kim Ha-na	(China) Xu Chen (China) Ma Jin	15–21, 21–16, 13–21	(silver) Runner-up
2016	Japan Open	(South Korea) Kim Ha-na	(China) Zheng Siwei (China) Chen Qingchen	10–21, 15–21	(silver) Runner-up
2016	Korea Open	(South Korea) Kim Ha-na	(China) Zheng Siwei (China) Chen Qingchen	21–14, 21–19	(gold) Winner
2016	French Open	(South Korea) Kim Ha-na	(China) Zheng Siwei (China) Chen Qingchen	16–21, 15–21	(silver) Runner-up

BWF Super Series Finals tournament
BWF Super Series Premier tournament
BWF Super Series tournament

=== BWF Grand Prix (18 titles, 7 runners-up) ===
The BWF Grand Prix had two levels, the Grand Prix and Grand Prix Gold. It was a series of badminton tournaments sanctioned by the Badminton World Federation (BWF) and played between 2007 and 2017.

Men's doubles
Year	Tournament	Partner	Opponent	Score	Result
2007	Vietnam Open	(South Korea) Kwon Yi-goo	(South Korea) Cho Gun-woo (South Korea) Kang Myeong-won	21–17, 21–12	(gold) Winner
2010	Macau Open	(South Korea) Yoo Yeon-seong	(Indonesia) Hendra Aprida Gunawan (Indonesia) Alvent Yulianto	21–17, 21–15	(gold) Winner
2010	Korea Grand Prix	(South Korea) Yoo Yeon-seong	(South Korea) Jung Jae-sung (South Korea) Lee Yong-dae	21–18, 18–21, 25–27	(silver) Runner-up
2011	Swiss Open	(South Korea) Yoo Yeon-seong	(South Korea) Jung Jae-sung (South Korea) Lee Yong-dae	21–17, 21–16	(gold) Winner
2011	U.S. Open	(South Korea) Lee Yong-dae	(United States) Howard Bach (United States) Tony Gunawan	21–9, 21–19	(gold) Winner
2011	Canada Open	(South Korea) Lee Yong-dae	(China) Liu Xiaolong (China) Qiu Zihan	21–18, 21–16	(gold) Winner
2011	Chinese Taipei Open	(South Korea) Yoo Yeon-seong	(South Korea) Jung Jae-sung (South Korea) Lee Yong-dae	23–21, 21–17	(gold) Winner
2011	Macau Open	(South Korea) Yoo Yeon-seong	(China) Chai Biao (China) Guo Zhendong	19–21, 19–21	(silver) Runner-up
2011	Korea Grand Prix Gold	(South Korea) Yoo Yeon-seong	(South Korea) Jung Jae-sung (South Korea) Lee Yong-dae	21–15, 24–22	(gold) Winner
2012	Korea Grand Prix Gold	(South Korea) Lee Yong-dae	(South Korea) Kim Gi-jung (South Korea) Kim Sa-rang	21–12, 21–11	(gold) Winner
2012	India Grand Prix Gold	(South Korea) Lee Yong-dae	(South Korea) Kang Ji-wook (South Korea) Lee Sang-joon	21–13, 21–19	(gold) Winner
2013	Swiss Open	(South Korea) Lee Yong-dae	(China) Chai Biao (China) Hong Wei	14–21, 21–18, 14–21	(silver) Runner-up
2013	Korea Grand Prix Gold	(South Korea) Shin Baek-cheol	(South Korea) Kim Gi-jung (South Korea) Kim Sa-rang	15–21, 21–18, 23–25	(silver) Runner-up
2014	Korea Grand Prix	(South Korea) Shin Baek-cheol	(South Korea) Lee Yong-dae (South Korea) Yoo Yeon-seong	18–21, 19–21	(silver) Runner-up
2015	Korea Masters	(South Korea) Shin Baek-cheol	(South Korea) Kim Gi-jung (South Korea) Kim Sa-rang	21–16, 18–21, 19–21	(silver) Runner-up
2015	Macau Open	(South Korea) Shin Baek-cheol	(Indonesia) Berry Angriawan (Indonesia) Rian Agung Saputro	22–20, 21–14	(gold) Winner
2016	German Open	(South Korea) Shin Baek-cheol	(South Korea) Lee Yong-dae (South Korea) Yoo Yeon-seong	20–22, 21–18, 21–17	(gold) Winner
2016	New Zealand Open	(South Korea) Shin Baek-cheol	(Indonesia) Angga Pratama (Indonesia) Ricky Karanda Suwardi	21–18, 21–14	(gold) Winner
2016	Korea Masters	(South Korea) Kim Jae-hwan	(Chinese Taipei) Lee Jhe-huei (Chinese Taipei) Lee Yang	21–19, 21–18	(gold) Winner

Mixed doubles
Year	Tournament	Partner	Opponent	Score	Result
2011	Chinese Taipei Open	(South Korea) Eom Hye-won	(Indonesia) Tontowi Ahmad (Indonesia) Liliyana Natsir	24–22, 16–21, 21–17	(gold) Winner
2014	German Open	(South Korea) Kim Ha-na	(Scotland) Robert Blair (Scotland) Imogen Bankier	15–21, 18–21	(silver) Runner-up
2015	Chinese Taipei Open	(South Korea) Kim Ha-na	(South Korea) Shin Baek-cheol (South Korea) Chae Yoo-jung	21–16, 21–18	(gold) Winner
2015	Korea Masters	(South Korea) Kim Ha-na	(South Korea) Shin Baek-cheol (South Korea) Chae Yoo-jung	19–21, 21–17, 21–19	(gold) Winner
2016	German Open	(South Korea) Kim Ha-na	(South Korea) Shin Baek-cheol (South Korea) Chae Yoo-jung	21–19, 21–12	(gold) Winner
2016	Korea Masters	(South Korea) Kim Ha-na	(Thailand) Dechapol Puavaranukroh (Thailand) Sapsiree Taerattanachai	21–19, 21–16	(gold) Winner

BWF Grand Prix Gold tournament
BWF Grand Prix tournament

=== BWF International Challenge/Series (5 titles, 2 runners-up) ===
Men's doubles
Year	Tournament	Partner	Opponent	Score	Result
2007	Korea International	(South Korea) Kwon Yi-goo	(South Korea) Hong In-pyo (South Korea) Choi Min-ho	21–10, 21–13	(gold) Winner
2008	Osaka International	(South Korea) Kwon Yi-goo	(Japan) Keishi Kawaguchi (Japan) Naoki Kawamae	21–11, 21–16	(gold) Winner
2009	Korea International	(South Korea) Yoo Yeon-seong	(South Korea) Lee Yong-dae (South Korea) Jung Jae-sung	19–21, 21–15, 15–21	(silver) Runner-up
2012	India International	(South Korea) Lee Yong-dae	(South Korea) Cho Gun-woo (South Korea) Kim Dae-eun	21–11, 21–10	(gold) Winner
2018	Malaysia International	(South Korea) Shin Baek-cheol	(Chinese Taipei) Lin Shang-kai (Chinese Taipei) Tseng Min-hao	21–18, 30–29	(gold) Winner
2019	Osaka International	(South Korea) Shin Baek-cheol	(South Korea) Kang Min-hyuk (South Korea) Kim Jae-hwan	21–13, 21–16	(gold) Winner

Mixed doubles
Year	Tournament	Partner	Opponent	Score	Result
2009	Korea International	(South Korea) Ha Jung-eun	(South Korea) Lee Yong-dae (South Korea) Lee Hyo-jung	14–21, 21–15, 9–21	(silver) Runner-up

BWF International Challenge tournament
BWF International Series tournament
