= 2008 BWF Super Series =

Tournament details
- Dates: 15 January – 21 December 2008
- Edition: 2nd

The 2008 BWF Super Series was the second season of the BWF Super Series. The season spanned between the continental of Asia and Europe and was starting with Malaysia Open from January 15 and ended with Hong Kong Open on November 30, 2008. The top eight ranked players competed in the Masters Finals in Kota Kinabalu, Sabah, Malaysia from December 18 to December 21, 2008.

== Schedule ==
Below is the schedule released by the Badminton World Federation:

Tour	Official title	Venue	City	Date		Prize money USD	Report
Tour	Official title	Venue	City	Start	Finish	Prize money USD	Report
1	Malaysia Open Super Series	Putra Indoor Stadium	Kuala Lumpur	January 15	January 20	200,000	Report
2	(South Korea) Korea Open Super Series	Jangchung Gymnasium	Seoul	January 22	January 27	300,000	Report
3	All England Super Series	National Indoor Arena	Birmingham	March 4	March 9	200,000	Report
4	(Switzerland) Swiss Open Super Series	St. Jakobshalle	Basel	March 11	March 16	200,000	Report
5	Singapore Super Series	Singapore Indoor Stadium	Singapore	June 10	June 15	200,000	Report
6	Indonesia Super Series	Istora Senayan	Jakarta	June 17	June 22	250,000	Report
7	Japan Super Series	Tokyo Metropolitan Gymnasium	Tokyo	September 16	September 21	200,000	Report
8	China Masters Super Series	Changzhou Olympic Sports Center	Changzhou	September 23	September 28	200,000	Report
9	Denmark Super Series	Arena Fyn	Odense	October 21	October 26	200,000	Report
10	(France) French Super Series	Stade Pierre de Coubertin	Paris	October 28	November 2	200,000	Report
11	China Open Super Series	Yuanshen Sports Development Center	Pudong, Shanghai	November 18	November 23	250,000	Report
12	Hong Kong Super Series	Queen Elizabeth Stadium	Wan Chai, Hong Kong	November 25	November 30	200,000	Report
13	(Malaysia) Super Series Masters Finals	Likas Indoor Stadium	Kota Kinabalu, Sabah	December 18	December 21	500,000	Report

== Results ==
=== Winners ===
Tour	Men's singles	Women's singles	Men's doubles	Women's doubles	Mixed doubles
Malaysia	(Malaysia) Lee Chong Wei	(Denmark) Tine Rasmussen	(Indonesia) Markis Kido (Indonesia) Hendra Setiawan	(China) Yang Wei (China) Zhang Jiewen	(China) He Hanbin (China) Yu Yang
(South Korea) Korea	(South Korea) Lee Hyun-il	(Hong Kong) Zhou Mi	(China) Fu Haifeng (China) Cai Yun	(China) Du Jing (China) Yu Yang	(South Korea) Lee Yong-dae (South Korea) Lee Hyo-jung
England	(China) Chen Jin	(Denmark) Tine Rasmussen	(South Korea) Jung Jae-sung (South Korea) Lee Yong-dae	(South Korea) Lee Hyo-jung (South Korea) Lee Kyung-won	(China) Zheng Bo (China) Gao Ling
(Switzerland) Swiss	(China) Lin Dan	(China) Xie Xingfang	(South Korea) Jung Jae-sung (South Korea) Lee Yong-dae	(China) Yang Wei (China) Zhang Jiewen	(China) He Hanbin (China) Yu Yang
Singapore	(Malaysia) Lee Chong Wei	(Denmark) Tine Rasmussen	(Malaysia) Zakry Abdul Latif (Malaysia) Fairuzizuan Mohd Tazari	(China) Du Jing (China) Yu Yang	(Indonesia) Nova Widianto (Indonesia) Lilyana Natsir
Indonesia	(Indonesia) Sony Dwi Kuncoro	(China) Zhu Lin	(Malaysia) Zakry Abdul Latif (Malaysia) Fairuzizuan Mohd Tazari	(Indonesia) Vita Marissa (Indonesia) Lilyana Natsir	(China) Zheng Bo (China) Gao Ling
Japan	(Indonesia) Sony Dwi Kuncoro	(China) Wang Yihan	(Denmark) Lars Paaske (Denmark) Jonas Rasmussen	(China) Cheng Shu (China) Zhao Yunlei	(Indonesia) Muhammad Rijal (Indonesia) Vita Marissa
China Masters	(Indonesia) Sony Dwi Kuncoro	(Hong Kong) Zhou Mi	(Indonesia) Markis Kido (Indonesia) Hendra Setiawan	(China) Cheng Shu (China) Zhao Yunlei	(China) Xie Zhongbo (China) Zhang Yawen
Denmark	(Denmark) Peter Gade	(China) Wang Lin	(Indonesia) Markis Kido (Indonesia) Hendra Setiawan	(Malaysia) Wong Pei Tty (Malaysia) Chin Eei Hui	(Denmark) Joachim Fischer Nielsen (Denmark) Christinna Pedersen
(France) French	(Denmark) Peter Gade	(China) Wang Lin	(Indonesia) Markis Kido (Indonesia) Hendra Setiawan	(China) Du Jing (China) Yu Yang	(China) He Hanbin (China) Yu Yang
China Open	(China) Lin Dan	(China) Jiang Yanjiao	(South Korea) Jung Jae-sung (South Korea) Lee Yong-dae	(China) Zhang Yawen (China) Zhao Tingting	(South Korea) Lee Yong-dae (South Korea) Lee Hyo-jung
Hong Kong	(China) Chen Jin	(Hong Kong) Wang Chen	(South Korea) Jung Jae-sung (South Korea) Lee Yong-dae	(China) Zhang Yawen (China) Zhao Tingting	(China) Xie Zhongbo (China) Zhang Yawen
(Malaysia) Masters Finals	(Malaysia) Lee Chong Wei	(Hong Kong) Zhou Mi	(Malaysia) Koo Kien Keat (Malaysia) Tan Boon Heong	(Malaysia) Chin Eei Hui (Malaysia) Wong Pei Tty	(Denmark) Thomas Laybourn (Denmark) Kamilla Rytter Juhl

=== Performances by countries ===
Tabulated below are the Super Series performances based on countries. Only countries who have won a title are listed:

Team	MAS	KOR	ENG	SUI	SIN	INA	JPN	CHN	DEN	FRA	CHN	HKG	SSF	Total
China	2	2	2	4	1	2	2	2	1	3	3	3		27
Indonesia	1				1	2	2	2	1	1				10
Malaysia	1				2	1			1				3	8
Denmark	1		1		1		1		2	1			1	8
Korea		2	2	1							2	1		8
Hong Kong		1						1				1	1	4

== Super Series Rankings ==
All the progress and points below are carry forward from the tournament for past 52 weeks as state by BWF's world ranking system.

=== Leader progress ===
Tabulated below are the leader progress in Super Series ranking towards the Super Series Final:

Category	Players	MAS	KOR	ENG	SUI	SIN	INA	JPN	CHN	DEN	FRA	CHN	HKG
Men's singles	(Malaysia) Lee Chong Wei	✓	✓	✓	✓	✓	✓	✓	✓	✓	✓	✓	✓
Women's singles	(China) Xie Xingfang	✓	✓		✓								
Women's singles	(China) Lu Lan			✓		✓	✓	✓	✓				
Women's singles	(Hong Kong) Zhou Mi									✓	✓	✓	✓
Men's doubles	(China) Fu Haifeng (China) Cai Yun	✓	✓	✓									
Men's doubles	(Indonesia) Markis Kido (Indonesia) Hendra Setiawan				✓	✓	✓	✓	✓	✓	✓	✓	✓
Women's doubles	(China) Zhang Yawen (China) Wei Yili	✓	✓	✓	✓		✓						
Women's doubles	(China) Du Jing (China) Yu Yang					✓		✓	✓	✓			
Women's doubles	(Malaysia) Wong Pei Tty (Malaysia) Chin Eei Hui										✓	✓	✓
Mixed doubles	(China) Zheng Bo (China) Gao Ling	✓											
Mixed doubles	(Indonesia) Nova Widianto (Indonesia) Lilyana Natsir		✓	✓	✓	✓	✓	✓	✓	✓	✓	✓	✓

=== Men's singles ===
Legend
1	Winner(s)
2	Runners-up
SF	Semi-finalists
QF	Quarter-finalists
R2	Last 16
R1	Last 32
Q	Qualification
DNP	Did not play

Rank	Players	MAS	KOR	ENG	SUI	SIN	INA	JPN	CHN	DEN	FRA	CHN	HKG	Points
1	(Malaysia) Lee Chong Wei	1	R2	SF	2	1	DNP	2	DNP	DNP	SF	2	DNP	58,240
2	(China) Chen Jin	R2	QF	1	R1	DNP	DNP	DNP	2	QF	QF	QF	1	52,180
3	(Indonesia) Sony Dwi Kuncoro	R1	QF	QF	R1	DNP	1	1	1	R2	R2	DNP	DNP	49,320
4	(Denmark) Joachim Persson	DNP	DNP	QF	R2	QF	R2	DNP	QF	2	QF	R2		45,180
5	(Denmark) Peter Gade	DNP	SF	DNP	DNP	SF	R2	R1	DNP	1	1	R2	R2	44,260
6	(China) Lin Dan	DNP	2	2	1	DNP	DNP	DNP	DNP	DNP	DNP	1	2	41,800
7	(Indonesia) Taufik Hidayat	R2	DNP	QF	QF	DNP	DNP	QF	QF	DNP	2	R2	SF	41,580
8	(China) Bao Chunlai	QF	QF	SF	SF	DNP	SF	DNP	SF	DNP	DNP	DNP	DNP	35,760
8	(Denmark) Kenneth Jonassen	SF	SF	QF	QF	DNP	DNP	DNP	DNP	SF	SF	DNP	DNP	35,760
10	(Hong Kong) Chan Yan Kit	R1	R2	R1	R1	R1	R1	R1	R2	R1	R2	R1	R2	29,520

=== Women's singles ===
Rank	Players	MAS	KOR	ENG	SUI	SIN	INA	JPN	CHN	DEN	FRA	CHN	HKG	Points
1	(Hong Kong) Zhou Mi	R2	1	R1	QF	2	QF	2	1	2	R2	QF	SF	72,760
2	(Denmark) Tine Rasmussen	1	DNP	1	DNP	1	R1	SF	QF	SF	SF	R2	R2	61,320
3	(Hong Kong) Wang Chen	QF	QF	QF	QF	QF	QF	QF	R2	R1	R1	SF	1	54,740
4	(China) Zhu Lin	2	DNP	R2	QF	DNP	1	R1	QF	QF	R1	SF	SF	53,000
5	(China) Lu Lan	QF	2	2	QF	DNP	DNP	SF	QF	SF	SF	DNP	DNP	49,980
6	(China) Wang Lin	DNP	DNP	DNP	DNP	R2	DNP	R2	2	1	1	SF	R1	42,040
7	(France) Pi Hongyan	SF	R1	QF	SF	R2	SF	DNP	DNP	DNP	QF	R1	R1	39,600
8	(Germany) Xu Huaiwen	R1	QF	SF	SF	DNP	DNP	R2	DNP	R1	R2	R2	R2	36,720
9	(South Korea) Hwang Hye-youn	R2	R1	SF	R1	QF	R2	QF	DNP	DNP	DNP	R1	QF	35,400
10	(Malaysia) Wong Mew Choo	SF	R1	QF	R2	SF	DNP	R2	DNP	DNP	R1	R2	R1	35,340

=== Men's doubles ===
Rank	Players	MAS	KOR	ENG	SUI	SIN	INA	JPN	CHN	DEN	FRA	CHN	HKG	Points
1	(Indonesia) Markis Kido (Indonesia) Hendra Setiawan	1	R2	R1	2	DNP	QF	QF	1	1	1	DNP	QF	65,540
2	(Malaysia) Mohd Zakry Abdul Latif (Malaysia) Mohd Fairuzizuan Mohd Tazari	R2	R2	R1	SF	1	1	R2	R2	QF	QF	QF	2	61,600
3	(Denmark) Lars Paaske (Denmark) Jonas Rasmussen	2	SF	QF	R2	R1	DNP	1	DNP	SF	SF	QF	DNP	52,160
4	(South Korea) Jung Jae-sung (South Korea) Lee Yong-dae	R1	QF	1	1	DNP	DNP	DNP	DNP	DNP	DNP	1	1	45,440
5	(Denmark) Mathias Boe (Denmark) Carsten Mogensen	R2	SF	R2	QF	DNP	QF	DNP	DNP	R2	R2	2	R1	40,920
6	(Indonesia) Candra Wijaya (United States) Tony Gunawan	SF	DNP	R2	QF	DNP	2	QF	DNP	DNP	DNP	SF	R1	36,540
7	(Malaysia) Koo Kien Keat (Malaysia) Tan Boon Heong	R2	DNP	R1	R2	DNP	DNP	DNP	R2	QF	SF	SF	SF	35,940
8	(China) Fu Haifeng (China) Cai Yun	SF	1	R2	R2	DNP	DNP	DNP	SF	DNP	DNP	QF	DNP	34,280
9	(Indonesia) Rian Sukmawan (Indonesia) Yonatan Suryatama Dasuki	DNP	DNP	R1	DNP	R2	R1	SF	QF	QF	QF	DNP	R1	31,800
10	(Japan) Shuichi Sakamoto (Japan) Shintaro Ikeda	R1	R2	SF	R2	R2	R2	QF	DNP	DNP	DNP	DNP	R2	31,680

=== Women's doubles ===
Rank	Players	MAS	KOR	ENG	SUI	SIN	INA	JPN	CHN	DEN	FRA	CHN	HKG	Points
1	(Malaysia) Wong Pei Tty (Malaysia) Chin Eei Hui	R2	QF	R2	R1	R1	QF	2	QF	1	2	2	SF	64,340
2	(China) Du Jing (China) Yu Yang	SF	1	2	SF	1	DNP	DNP	DNP	DNP	1	SF	DNP	54,660
3	(Indonesia) Lilyana Natsir (Indonesia) Vita Marissa	R2	QF	R2	R2	SF	1	SF	QF	DNP	QF	DNP	QF	51,560
4	(China) Zhao Yunlei (China) Cheng Shu	DNP	DNP	DNP	DNP	DNP	DNP	1	1	R2	SF	QF	2	39,880
5	(Denmark) Lena Frier Kristiansen (Denmark) Kamilla Rytter Juhl	R2	DNP	R2	R2	QF	R2	DNP	DNP	QF	QF	QF	QF	39,660
6	(South Korea) Ha Jung-eun (South Korea) Kim Min-jung	R1	R2	R2	R2	SF	QF	R2	DNP	DNP	DNP	SF	SF	39,540
7	(Japan) Miyuki Maeda (Japan) Satoko Suetsuna	QF	R1	R1	DNP	QF	2	SF	DNP	DNP	DNP	DNP	DNP	30,960
8	(South Korea) Lee Kyung-won (South Korea) Lee Hyo-jung	SF	SF	1	SF	DNP	DNP	DNP	DNP	DNP	DNP	DNP	DNP	28,460
9	(China) Zhang Yawen (China) Wei Yili	DNP	SF	SF	2	DNP	SF	DNP	DNP	DNP	DNP	DNP	DNP	27,060
10	(China) Gao Ling (China) Zhao Tingting	2	2	QF	QF	DN	DNP	DNP	DNP	DNP	DNP	DNP	DNP	25,680

=== Mixed doubles ===
Rank	Players	MAS	KOR	ENG	SUI	SIN	INA	JPN	CHN	DEN	FRA	CHN	HKG	Points
1	(Indonesia) Nova Widianto (Indonesia) Lilyana Natsir	QF	R1	2	SF	1	SF	2	2	DNP	SF	DNP	QF	64,160
2	(China) He Hanbin (China) Yu Yang	1	R1	QF	1	DNP	DNP	DNP	SF	DNP	SF	QF	QF	51,360
3	(Denmark) Thomas Laybourn (Denmark) Kamilla Rytter Juhl	R2	QF	R2	R2	R1	2	DNP	DNP	2	R2	SF	SF	48,720
4	(South Korea) Lee Yong-dae (South Korea) Lee Hyo-jung	2	1	QF	SF	DNP	DNP	DNP	DNP	DNP	DNP	1	2	45,460
5	(England) Anthony Clark (England) Donna Kellogg	DNP	R2	QF	2	2	DNP	DNP	DNP	QF	2	R1	R2	41,520
6	(China) Xie Zhongbo (China) Zhang Yawen	DNP	SF	SF	QF	DNP	DNP	DNP	1	DNP	DNP	R2	1	39,880
7	(England) Robert Blair (Scotland) Imogen Bankier	R2	Q	QF	R2	DNP	QF	R2	DNP	SF	R2	QF	R2	37,210
8	(Thailand) Sudket Prapakamol (Thailand) Saralee Thungthongkam	SF	QF	R2	QF	QF	DNP	R2	QF	DNP	DNP	R1	R1	36,840
9	(Thailand) Songphon Anugritayawon (Thailand) Kunchala Voravichitchaikul	R2	R1	DNP	DNP	SF	R2	SF	R2	DNP	DNP	R2	R2	33,060
10	(China) Zheng Bo (China) Gao Ling	DNP	DNP	1	QF	QF	1	DNP	DNP	DNP	DNP	DNP	DNP	28,480
