= 2008 BWF Super Series Masters Finals =

2008 Super Series Masters Finals
Tournament details
- Dates: December 18, 2008 - December 21, 2008
- Total prize money: US$500,000
- Venue: Likas Indoor Stadium
- Location: Kota Kinabalu, Sabah, Malaysia

Champions
- Men's singles: (Malaysia) Lee Chong Wei
- Women's singles: (Hong Kong) Zhou Mi
- Men's doubles: (Malaysia) Koo Kien Keat (Malaysia) Tan Boon Heong
- Women's doubles: (Malaysia) Wong Pei Tty (Malaysia) Chin Eei Hui
- Mixed doubles: (Denmark) Thomas Laybourn (Denmark) Kamilla Rytter Juhl

The 2008 BWF Super Series Masters Finals is the season ending tournament for 2008 BWF Super Series in badminton. It is held in Kota Kinabalu, Sabah, Malaysia from December 18 to December 21, 2008.

The tournament was marred with the withdrawal of China, citing tiredness and injuries to their players.

== Representatives by nation ==
Top Nations
Rank	Nation	MS	WS	MD	WD	XD	Total	Players
1	Indonesia	2	0	1.5	2	2	7.5	11^{§}
2	Denmark	2	1	2	1	1	7	10^{§}
2	Malaysia	2	1	2	1	1	7	10^{§}
4	England	1	0	1	0	1.5	3.5	5^{§}
5	Thailand	0	0	0	1	2	3	5^{§}
6	Hong Kong	1	2	0	0	0	3	3
7	South Korea	0	0	1	1	0	2	4
8	Germany	0	1	0	0.5	0	1.5	2
9	Netherlands	0	0	0	1	0	1	2
10	France	0	1	0	0	0	1	1
10	India	0	1	0	0	0	1	1
10	Japan	0	1	0	0	0	1	1
13	Canada	0	0	0	0.5	0	0.5	1
13	Scotland	0	0	0	0	0.5	0.5	1
13	United States	0	0	0.5	0	0	0.5	1
Total		8	8	8	8	8	40	58

§: Robert Blair from England was the only player who played in two categories (men's doubles and mixed doubles), while Kamilla Rytter Juhl from Denmark, Wong Pei Tty from Malaysia, Kunchala Voravichitchaikul from Thailand, Lilyana Natsir and Vita Marissa from Indonesia were the players who played in two categories (women's doubles and mixed doubles).

== Performance by nation ==
Nation	Group Phase	Semifinal	Final	Winner
Indonesia	7.5	6	2	
Malaysia	7	4	3	3
Thailand	3	1		
Hong Kong	3	2	2	1
Denmark	7	3	2	1
South Korea	2	2	1	
Germany	1.5			
India	1	1		
Netherlands	1			
England	3.5	1		
France	1			
Japan	1			
Canada	0.5			
United States	0.5			
Scotland	0.5			

== Men's singles ==
=== Seeds ===
1. (Malaysia) Lee Chong Wei
2. (Indonesia) Sony Dwi Kuncoro
3. (Denmark) Joachim Persson
4. (Denmark) Peter Gade
5. (Indonesia) Taufik Hidayat
6. (Hong Kong) Chan Yan Kit
7. (England) Andrew Smith
8. (Malaysia) Wong Choong Hann

=== Group A ===
No.	Players	Played	Points	Matches	Games	Points
1	(Malaysia) Lee Chong Wei	3	3	3-0	6-1	146-106
2	(Denmark) Peter Gade	3	1	1-2	3-4	133-130
3	(Malaysia) Wong Choong Hann	3	1	1-2	3-4	117-136
4	(Hong Kong) Chan Yan Kit	3	1	1-2	2-5	115-139

=== Group B ===
No.	Players	Played	Points	Matches	Games	Points
1	(Indonesia) Sony Dwi Kuncoro	3	3	3-0	6-3	183-142
2	(Indonesia) Taufik Hidayat	3	2	2-1	5-3	154-140
3	(Denmark) Joachim Persson	3	1	1-2	4-5	150-163
4	(England) Andrew Smith	3	0	0-3	2-6	120-162

=== Results ===
Semifinals
(Malaysia) Lee Chong Wei	21	21
(Indonesia) Taufik Hidayat	5	10
(Denmark) Peter Gade	21	21
(Indonesia) Sony Dwi Kuncoro	10	10

Final
(Malaysia) Lee Chong Wei	21	21
(Denmark) Peter Gade	8	16

== Women's singles ==
=== Seeds ===
1. (Hong Kong) Zhou Mi
2. (Denmark) Tine Rasmussen
3. (Hong Kong) Wang Chen
4. (France) Pi Hongyan
5. (Germany) Xu Huaiwen
6. (Malaysia) Wong Mew Choo
7. (India) Saina Nehwal
8. (Japan) Yu Hirayama

=== Group A ===
No.	Players	Played	Points	Matches	Games	Points
1	(Hong Kong) Wang Chen	3	3	3-0	6-2	160-108
2	(Hong Kong) Zhou Mi	3	2	2-1	4-2	111-84
3	(Germany) Xu Huaiwen	3	1	1-2	3-4	113-126
4	(Japan) Yu Hirayama	3	0	0-3	1-6	78-114

=== Group B ===
No.	Players	Played	Points	Matches	Games	Points
1	(Denmark) Tine Rasmussen	3	3	3-0	6-0	126-80
2	(India) Saina Nehwal	3	2	2-1	4-3	133-120
3	(France) Pi Hongyan	3	1	1-2	2-5	116-138
4	(Malaysia) Wong Mew Choo	3	0	0-3	2-6	127-164

=== Results ===
Semifinals
(Hong Kong) Wang Chen	15	21	21
(India) Saina Nehwal	21	14	16
(Hong Kong) Zhou Mi	21	21
(Denmark) Tine Rasmussen	13	16

Final
(Hong Kong) Wang Chen	14	18
(Hong Kong) Zhou Mi	21	21

== Men's doubles ==
=== Seeds ===
1. (Indonesia) Markis Kido / Hendra Setiawan
2. (Malaysia) Mohd Zakry Abdul Latif / Mohd Fairuzizuan Mohd Tazari
3. (South Korea) Jung Jae-sung / Lee Yong-dae
4. (Denmark) Mathias Boe / Carsten Mogensen
5. (Indonesia) Candra Wijaya / (United States) Tony Gunawan
6. (Malaysia) Koo Kien Keat / Tan Boon Heong
7. (Denmark) Simon Mollyhus / Anders Kristiansen
8. (England) Robert Blair / Chris Adcock

=== Group A ===
No.	Pairs	Played	Points	Matches	Games	Points
1	(South Korea) Jung Jae-sung (South Korea) Lee Yong-dae	3	3	3-0	6-1	138-113
2	(Malaysia) Mohd Zakry Abdul Latif (Malaysia) Mohd Fairuzizuan Mohd Tazari	3	2	2-1	4-3	136-124
3	(England) Robert Blair (England) Chris Adcock	3	1	1-2	4-4	140-150
4	(Denmark) Simon Mollyhus (Denmark) Anders Kristiansen	3	0	0-3	0-6	99-126

=== Group B ===
No.	Pairs	Played	Points	Matches	Games	Points
1	(Malaysia) Koo Kien Keat (Malaysia) Tan Boon Heong	3	3	3-0	6-1	143-107
2	(Indonesia) Markis Kido (Indonesia) Hendra Setiawan	3	2	2-1	5-4	173-162
3	(Indonesia) Candra Wijaya (United States) Tony Gunawan	3	1	1-2	3-4	119-142
4	(Denmark) Mathias Boe (Denmark) Carsten Mogensen	3	0	0-3	1-6	120-144

=== Results ===
Semifinals
(South Korea) Jung Jae-sung (South Korea) Lee Yong-dae	22	15	21
(Indonesia) Markis Kido (Indonesia) Hendra Setiawan	20	21	16
(Malaysia) Mohd Zakry Abdul Latif (Malaysia) Mohd Fairuzizuan Mohd Tazari	20	14
(Malaysia) Koo Kien Keat (Malaysia) Tan Boon Heong	22	21

Final
(South Korea) Jung Jae-sung (South Korea) Lee Yong-dae	18	14
(Malaysia) Koo Kien Keat (Malaysia) Tan Boon Heong	21	21

== Women's doubles ==
=== Seeds ===
1. (Malaysia) Wong Pei Tty / Chin Eei Hui
2. (Indonesia) Lilyana Natsir / Vita Marissa
3. (Denmark) Lena Frier Kristiansen / Kamilla Rytter Juhl
4. (South Korea) Ha Jung-eun / Kim Min-jung
5. (Canada) Charmaine Reid / (Germany) Nicole Grether
6. (Thailand) Duanganong Aroonkesorn / Kunchala Voravichitchaikul
7. (Indonesia) Jo Novita / Greysia Polii
8. (Netherlands) Judith Meulendijks / Yao Jie

=== Group A ===
No.	Pairs	Played	Points	Matches	Games	Points
1	(Indonesia) Vita Marissa (Indonesia) Lilyana Natsir	3	3	3-0	6-1	145-108
2	(South Korea) Ha Jung-eun (South Korea) Kim Min-jung	3	2	2-1	5-2	130-107
3	(Thailand) Duanganong Aroonkesorn (Thailand) Kunchala Voravichitchaikul	3	1	1-2	2-4	93-117
4	(Netherlands) Judith Meulendijks (Netherlands) Yao Jie	3	0	0-3	0-6	90-126

=== Group B ===
No.	Pairs	Played	Points	Matches	Games	Points
1	(Malaysia) Wong Pei Tty (Malaysia) Chin Eei Hui	3	3	3-0	6-1	135-104
2	(Indonesia) Jo Novita (Indonesia) Greysia Polii	3	2	2-1	5-2	135-114
3	(Denmark) Lena Frier Kristiansen (Denmark) Kamilla Rytter Juhl	3	1	1-2	2-4	110-108
4	(Canada) Charmaine Reid (Germany) Nicole Grether	3	0	0-3	0-6	72-126

=== Results ===
Semifinals
(Indonesia) Vita Marissa (Indonesia) Lilyana Natsir	21	21
(Indonesia) Jo Novita (Indonesia) Greysia Polii	19	17
(South Korea) Ha Jung-eun (South Korea) Kim Min-jung	21	19	17
(Malaysia) Wong Pei Tty (Malaysia) Chin Eei Hui	14	21	21

Final
(Indonesia) Vita Marissa (Indonesia) Lilyana Natsir	15	20
(Malaysia) Wong Pei Tty (Malaysia) Chin Eei Hui	21	22

== Mixed doubles ==
=== Seeds ===
1. (Indonesia) Nova Widianto / Lilyana Natsir
2. (Denmark) Thomas Laybourn / Kamilla Rytter Juhl
3. (England) Anthony Clark / Donna Kellogg
4. (England) Robert Blair / (Scotland) Imogen Bankier
5. (Thailand) Sudket Prapakamol / Saralee Thoungthongkam
6. (Thailand) Songphon Anugritayawon / Kunchala Voravichitchaikul
7. (Indonesia) Flandy Limpele / Vita Marissa
8. (Malaysia) Lim Khim Wah / Wong Pei Tty

=== Group A ===
No.	Pairs	Played	Points	Matches	Games	Points
1	(Indonesia) Nova Widianto (Indonesia) Lilyana Natsir	3	3	3-0	6-2	159-100
2	(Thailand) Sudket Prapakamol (Thailand) Saralee Thoungthongkam	3	2	2-1	5-3	139-144
3	(Indonesia) Flandy Limpele (Indonesia) Vita Marissa	3	1	1-2	3-4	120-134
4	(England) Robert Blair (Scotland) Imogen Bankier	3	0	0-3	1-6	103-143

=== Group B ===
No.	Pairs	Played	Points	Matches	Games	Points
1	(Denmark) Thomas Laybourn (Denmark) Kamilla Rytter Juhl	3	3	3-0	6-2	159-100
2	(England) Anthony Clark (England) Donna Kellogg	3	2	2-1	6-3	175-157
3	(Malaysia) Lim Khim Wah (Malaysia) Wong Pei Tty	3	1	1-2	3-5	136-103
4	(Thailand) Songphon Anugritayawon (Thailand) Kunchala Voravichitchaikul	3	0	0-3	2-6	129-161

=== Results ===
Semifinals
(Indonesia) Nova Widianto (Indonesia) Lilyana Natsir	23	21
(England) Anthony Clark (England) Donna Kellogg	21	17
(Thailand) Sudket Prapakamol (Thailand) Saralee Thoungthongkam	17	20
(Denmark) Thomas Laybourn (Denmark) Kamilla Rytter Juhl	21	20

Final
(Indonesia) Nova Widianto (Indonesia) Lilyana Natsir	19	21	20
(Denmark) Thomas Laybourn (Denmark) Kamilla Rytter Juhl	21	18	22
