= BWF Super Series =

Series of Grade 2 badminton tournaments

Official logo for Super Series Premier events

Official logo for Super Series events

The BWF Super Series was a series of Grade 2 badminton tournaments, sanctioned by Badminton World Federation (BWF). It was launched on December 14, 2006, and implemented in 2007.

Since 2011, the Super Series includes two levels of tournament, Super Series Premier and Super Series. A season of Super Series featured twelve tournaments around the world, including five of them classified as Super Series Premier. Super Series Premier tournament offers higher ranking point and higher minimum total prize money. Top eight players/pairs in each discipline in Super Series standings are invited to the Super Series Finals held at the year end.

BWF announced a new tournament structure in March 2017, BWF World Tour together with the new hosts for the 2018–2021 cycle to replace this Super Series tournament.

== Features ==
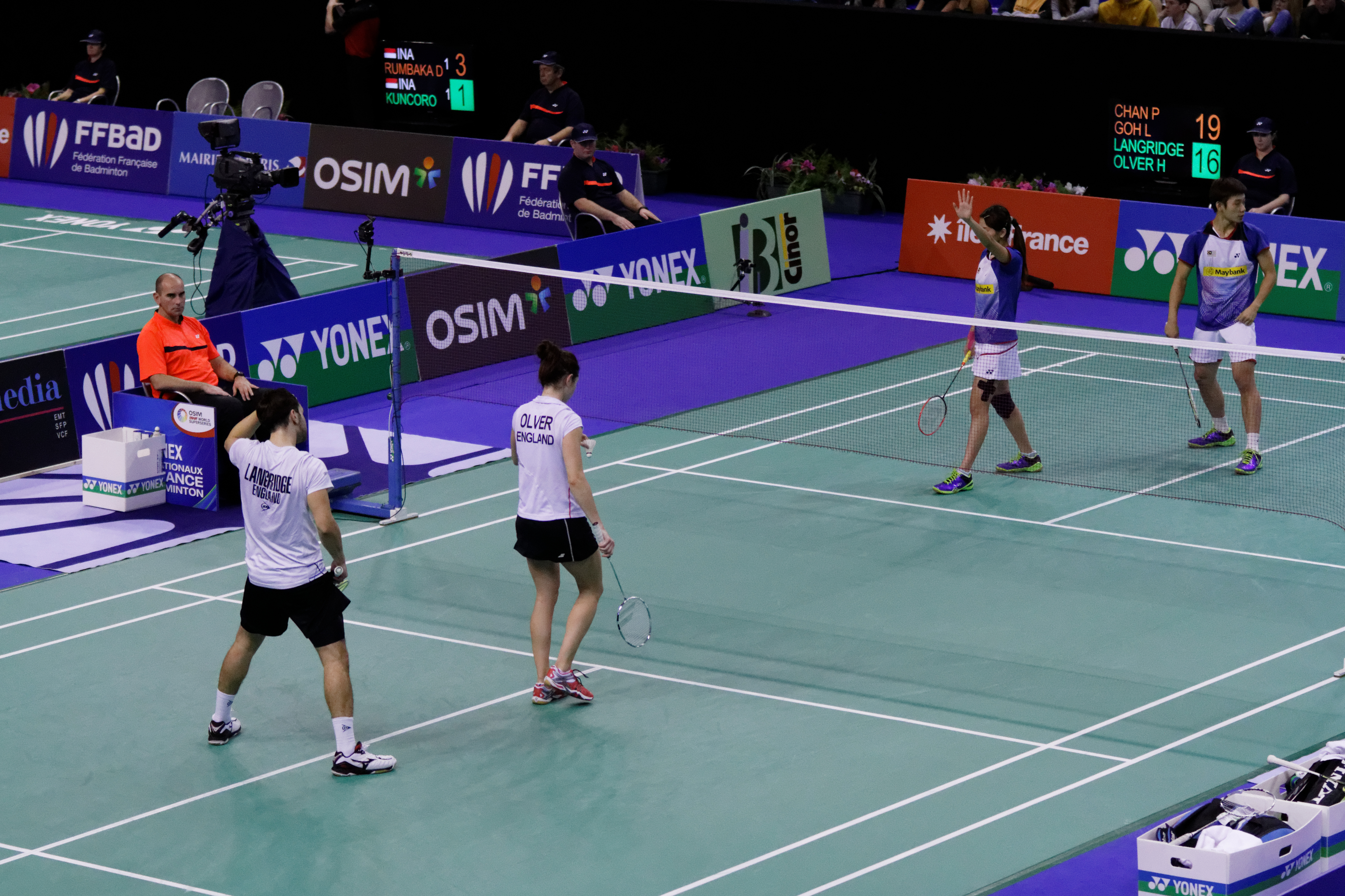
2013 French Super Series.

=== Prize money ===
A Super Series tournament offered a minimum total prize money of USD200,000; a Super Series Premier tournament offered minimum total prize money of US$350,000; Super Series Finals offered minimum total prize money of US$500,000. From 2014, a Super Series Premier tournament offered minimum total prize money of US$500,000, with minimum increment of US$50,000 each year until 2017. Super Series tournaments offered minimum total prize money of US$250,000, with an increment of US$25,000 each year up to 2017.

The Super Series offered the prize money regardless of the round from which a player is ousted, unless they went out in the qualification round. Starting in 2008 season, the women's winners received the equal prize money amount as men's winners. The prize money is distributed via the following formula:

$Total\ prize\ money\ \times \frac{Percentage}{100}$

Round	Men's singles	Women's singles	Men's doubles	Women's doubles	Mixed doubles
Winner	7.5%	7.5%	7.9%	7.9%	7.9%
Runner-up	3.8%	3.8%	3.8%	3.8%	3.8%
Semi-finalist	1.45%	1.45%	1.4%	1.4%	1.4%
Quarter-finalist	0.6%	0.6%	0.725%	0.725%	0.725%
Last 16	0.35%	0.35%	0.375%	0.375%	0.375%

=== World Ranking points ===
The Super Series Premier and Super Series tournaments offered ranking points to players based on the round a player/pair reaches. The Super Series Premier tournaments offered higher ranking points, second only to BWF tournaments (BWF World Championships and Summer Olympics). Points would be used for World Ranking and also Super Series standing to decide the top eight players/pairs qualified for the Super Series Finals.

=== Nationality separation ===
Starting in 2007, players from the same nation were not separated in the main draw of the tournaments. All but the top two seeds would not be divided into two draws as they were before. The top Chinese player Lin Dan has criticized the rule change. Since 2010 rules were altered with nationality separation in the first round.

=== Entries ===
Entries must be made five weeks before the start of the tournament. Only 32 players/pairs would play in the main round. Among the 32 players/pairs, only eight players/pair would be seeded in each event. Each event had 28 highest-ranked players/pairs in World Ranking and four qualifiers.

Prior to September 2008, 32 players/pairs were able to participate in qualifying rounds. Since then, only up to 16 players/pairs were allowed to participate in qualifying rounds, where four highest-ranked players/pairs in World Ranking would be seeded. This change was to avoid a big strain between the qualifiers and the main events.

Each Super Series tournament were held in six days, with the main round in five days.

=== Player commitment regulations ===
Starting in 2011, top ten players/pairs of each discipline in the World Ranking were required to play in all Super Series Premier tournaments and a minimum of four Super Series tournaments occurring in the full calendar year. Players who qualified for Super Series Finals were obliged to play. A fine and above the normal withdrawal fees would be imposed upon players/pairs who fail to play. Exemption from penalty would be considered by BWF on receipt of a valid medical certificate or strong evidence that prove players unfit to participate. However, retired or suspended players were not subject to these regulations.

=== Umpires ===
In 2007 season, each tournament hosts were allowed to present local umpires. However, after the outcry of several players during the tournaments, each Super Series tournaments must present eight international certificated and accredited umpires. Recent regulations state that at least six umpires must be from member associations other than the host member association, at least four BWF and two continental certificated umpires with well spread nationality.

== Tournaments ==
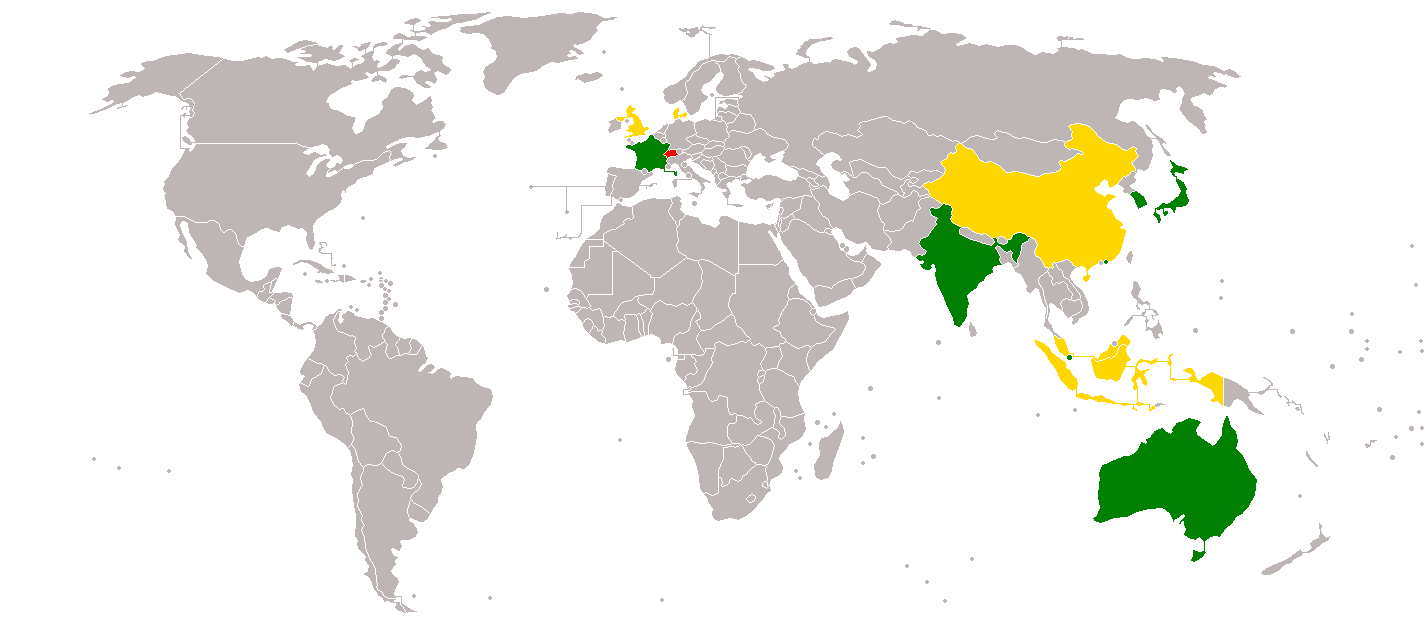
Countries already have Super Series tournament Super Series Premier Super Series Defunct

Every three years, the BWF Council would review the countries that host a Super Series Premier and Super Series tournament.

Historically, 14 tournaments in 13 countries hosted at least a season of the series. China was the sole country to host the series twice in a season from the year of 2007–2013. Starting in 2014 season, Australia hosted a Super Series tournament.

Tournament	Season										
Tournament	2007	2008	2009	2010	2011	2012	2013	2014	2015	2016	2017
All England Open	●	●	●	●	●	●	●	●	●	●	●
Australia Open								●	●	●	●
China Masters	●	●	●	●	●	●	●				
China Open	●	●	●	●	●	●	●	●	●	●	●
Denmark Open	●	●	●	●	●	●	●	●	●	●	●
French Open	●	●	●	●	●	●	●	●	●	●	●
Hong Kong Open	●	●	●	●	●	●	●	●	●	●	●
India Open					●	●	●	●	●	●	●
Indonesia Open	●	●	●	●	●	●	●	●	●	●	●
Japan Open	●	●	●	●	●	●	●	●	●	●	●
Korea Open	●	●	●	●	●	●	●	●	●	●	●
Malaysia Open	●	●	●	●	●	●	●	●	●	●	●
Singapore Open	●	●	●	●	●	●	●	●	●	●	●
Swiss Open	●	●	●	●							

● Super Series
● Super Series Premier

== BWF Super Series Finals ==
At the end of the Super Series circuit, top eight players/pairs in the Super Series standing of each discipline, with the maximum of two players/pairs from the same member association, were required to play in a final tournament known as the Super Series Finals. It offered minimum total prize money of US$500,000.

If two or more players were tied in ranking, the selection of players was based on the following criteria:

- The players who participated in the most Super Series tournaments;
- The players who collected the most points in Super Series tournaments starting on 1 July.

== Performances by countries ==
Tabulated below are the Super Series performances based on countries. Only countries who won a title are listed.

	Team	2007	2008	2009	2010	2011	2012	2013	2014	2015	2016	2017	Total
1	China	38	27	29	30	45	33	31	33	28	17	17	328
2	Indonesia	8	10	5	2	2	4	11	6	4	9	12	73
3	(South Korea) Korea	2	8	8	6	4	7	6	7	12	7	2	69
4	Malaysia	8	8	10	8	5	6	7	5	3	5	2	67
5	Denmark	2	8	7	9	5	4	5	6	2	7	6	61
6	Japan				1	2	1	2	2	6	9	10	33
7	Chinese Taipei			1	2	1	3	1	3		3	6	20
7	India			1	3		2		3	2	2	7	20
9	Thailand	1		1	2	1	3	1		1	4	1	15
10	Hong Kong	1	4	1			1			1	1	1	10
11	Spain									5		1	6
12	England			1				1		1			3
13	Poland			1	1								2
14	Germany						1						1
14	Russia										1		1
14	Singapore				1								1
14	United States	1											1

== Title sponsors ==
- Osim (2011–2013)
- MetLife (2014–2017)
