= 2008 Swiss Open Super Series =

Tournament details
- Dates: March 11, 2008 - March 16, 2008
- Total prize money: US$200,000
- Venue: St. Jakobshalle
- Location: Basel, Switzerland

The 2008 Swiss Open Super Series was the fourth tournament of 2008 BWF Super Series badminton tournament. It was held from March 11 to March 16, 2008, in Basel, Switzerland.

== Seeds ==
Men's singles

1. (China) Lin Dan
2. (Malaysia) Lee Chong Wei
3. (China) Bao Chunlai
4. (China) Chen Jin
5. (Denmark) Kenneth Jonassen
6. (Indonesia) Sony Dwi Kuncoro
7. (Indonesia) Taufik Hidayat
8. (Denmark) Peter Gade

Women's singles

1. (China) Xie Xingfang
2. (China) Zhang Ning
3. (China) Lu Lan
4. (China) Zhu Lin
5. (France) Pi Hongyan
6. (Hong Kong) Wang Chen
7. (Germany) Xu Huaiwen
8. (Malaysia) Wong Mew Choo

Men's doubles

1. (China) Cai Yun / Fu Haifeng
2. (Indonesia) Markis Kido / Hendra Setiawan
3. (Malaysia) Koo Kien Keat / Tan Boon Heong
4. (Malaysia) Choong Tan Fook / Lee Wan Wah
5. (United States) Tony Gunawan / (Indonesia) Candra Wijaya
6. (South Korea) Jung Jae-sung / Lee Yong-dae
7. (Denmark) Jens Eriksen / Martin Lundgaard Hansen
8. (Indonesia) Luluk Hadiyanto / Alvent Yulianto

Women's doubles

1. (China) Wei Yili / Zhang Yawen
2. (China) Yang Wei / Zhang Jiewen
3. (China) Du Jing / Yu Yang
4. (South Korea) Lee Hyo-jung / Lee Kyung-won
5. (China) Gao Ling / Zhao Tingting
6. (Chinese Taipei) Cheng Wen-hsing / Chien Yu-chin
7. (Japan) Kumiko Ogura / Reiko Shiota
8. (England) Gail Emms / Donna Kellogg

Mixed doubles

1. (China) Zheng Bo / Gao Ling
2. (Indonesia) Nova Widianto / Liliyana Natsir
3. (Indonesia) Flandy Limpele / Vita Marissa
4. (China) Xie Zhongbo / Zhang Yawen
5. (China) He Hanbin / Yu Yang
6. (South Korea) Lee Yong-dae / Lee Hyo-jung
7. (Thailand) Sudket Prapakamol / Saralee Thungthongkam
8. (England) Nathan Robertson / Gail Emms

== Results ==
=== Men's singles ===
1st round
1	(China) Lin Dan	21	21
PFQ	(Canada) Andrew Dabeka	12	7
(England) Andrew Smith	15	17
(China) Chen Yu	21	21
6	(Indonesia) Sony Dwi Kuncoro	13	11
(Malaysia) Sairul Amar Ayob	21	21
(Malaysia) Wong Choong Hann	18	21	21
(Malaysia) Lee Tsuen Seng	21	16	19
3	(China) Bao Chunlai	21	21
(Malaysia) Roslin Hashim	13	14
(Hong Kong) Ng Wei	21	21
(Switzerland) Christian Bösiger	15	11
7	(Indonesia) Taufik Hidayat	22	22
(Singapore) Kendrick Lee	20	20
(Japan) Shoji Sato	20	21	14
(India) Anup Sridhar	22	13	21
(South Korea) Lee Hyun-il	9	9
Q	(Vietnam) Nguyễn Tiến Minh	21	21
(Singapore) Ronald Susilo	21	16	21
PFQ	(China) Lü Yi	18	21	10
(Poland) Przemysław Wacha	21	21
Q	(Wales) Richard Vaughan	19	19
Q	(Czech Republic) Petr Koukal	21
4	(China) Chen Jin	13	R
(Japan) Sho Sasaki	15	21	14
(Denmark) Joachim Persson	21	13	21
(Hong Kong) Chan Yan Kit	8	7
5	(Denmark) Kenneth Jonassen	21	21
Q	(Netherlands) Dicky Palyama	21	26
(Thailand) Boonsak Ponsana	18	24
(South Korea) Park Sung-hwan	20	16
2	(Malaysia) Lee Chong Wei	22	21

2nd round
1	(China) Lin Dan	21	21
(China) Chen Yu	14	15
(Malaysia) Sairul Amar Ayob	21	18	24
(Malaysia) Wong Choong Hann	12	21	22
3	(China) Bao Chunlai	21	21
(Hong Kong) Ng Wei	13	13
7	(Indonesia) Taufik Hidayat	11
(India) Anup Sridhar	9	R
Q	(Vietnam) Nguyễn Tiến Minh	21	12	15
(Singapore) Ronald Susilo	18	21	21
(Poland) Przemysław Wacha	21	21
Q	(Czech Republic) Petr Koukal	19	14
(Denmark) Joachim Persson	15	16
(Denmark) Kenneth Jonassen	21	21
Q	(Netherlands) Dicky Palyama	12	21	12
2	(Malaysia) Lee Chong Wei	21	17	21

Quarterfinals
1	(China) Lin Dan	21	21
(Malaysia) Sairul Amar Ayob	13	9
3	(China) Bao Chunlai	20	21	21
7	(Indonesia) Taufik Hidayat	22	16	12
(Singapore) Ronald Susilo	21	15	8
(Poland) Przemysław Wacha	15	21	21
5	(Denmark) Kenneth Jonassen	13	15
2	(Malaysia) Lee Chong Wei	21	21

Semifinals
1	(China) Lin Dan	21	21
3	(China) Bao Chunlai	19	18
Finals
1	(China) Lin Dan	21	21
2	(Malaysia) Lee Chong Wei	13	18
(Poland) Przemysław Wacha	14	14
2	(Malaysia) Lee Chong Wei	21	21

=== Others ===
==== Semi-finals ====
Category	Winners	Losers	Score
Women's singles	(China) Xie Xingfang	(Germany) Xu Huaiwen	22–20, 21–10
Women's singles	(China) Zhang Ning	(France) Pi Hongyan	21–12, 15–21, 21–9
Men's doubles	(South Korea) Jung Jae-sung & Lee Yong-dae	(Malaysia) Choong Tan Fook & Lee Wan Wah	21–18, 21–19
Men's doubles	(Indonesia) Markis Kido & Hendra Setiawan	(Malaysia) Mohd Zakry Latif & Mohd Fairuzizuan Tazari	17–21, 21–17, 21–17
Women's doubles	(China) Wei Yili & Zhang Yawen	(South Korea) Lee Hyo-jung & Lee Kyung-won	21–15, 21–11
Women's doubles	(China) Yang Wei & Zhang Jiewen	(China) Du Jing & Yu Yang	26–24, 21–13
Mixed doubles	(China) He Hanbin & Yu Yang	(South Korea) Lee Yong-dae & Lee Hyo-jung	17–21, 21–13, 21–19
Mixed doubles	(England) Anthony Clark & Donna Kellogg	(Indonesia) Nova Widianto & Liliyana Natsir	23–25, 21–14, 21–14

==== Finals ====
Category	Winners	Runners-up	Score
Women's singles	(China) Xie Xingfang	(China) Zhang Ning	21–18, 21–17
Men's doubles	(South Korea) Jung Jae-sung & Lee Yong-dae	(Indonesia) Markis Kido & Hendra Setiawan	17–21, 21–16, 21–13
Women's doubles	(China) Yang Wei & Zhang Jiewen	(China) Wei Yili & Zhang Yawen	21–18, 22–24, 21–8
Mixed doubles	(China) He Hanbin & Yu Yang	(England) Anthony Clark & Donna Kellogg	21–15, 21–9
