= 2007 Indonesia Super Series =

2007 Indonesia Open Super Series
Tournament details
- Dates: 7–13 May
- Edition: 26th
- Level: Super Series
- Total prize money: US$250,000
- Venue: Istora Gelora Bung Karno
- Location: Jakarta, Indonesia

Champions
- Men's singles: (Malaysia) Lee Chong Wei
- Women's singles: (Hong Kong) Wang Chen
- Men's doubles: (China) Cai Yun (China) Fu Haifeng
- Women's doubles: (China) Du Jing (China) Yu Yang
- Mixed doubles: (China) Zheng Bo (China) Gao Ling

The 2007 Indonesia Open Super Series (officially known as the Djarum Indonesia Open Super Series 2007 for sponsorship reasons) was a badminton tournament which took place at the Istora Gelora Bung Karno in Jakarta, Indonesia, from 7 to 13 May 2007 and had a total purse of $250,000.

== Tournament ==
The 2007 Indonesia Open Super Series was the sixth tournament of the 2007 BWF Super Series and also part of the Indonesia Open championships, which had been held since 1982.

=== Venue ===
This international tournament was held at the Istora Gelora Bung Karno in Jakarta, Indonesia.

=== Point distribution ===
Below is the point distribution for each phase of the tournament based on the BWF points system for the BWF Super Series event.

Winner	Runner-up	3/4	5/8	9/16	17/32	33/64	65/128	129/256
9,200	7,800	6,420	5,040	3,600	2,220	880	430	170

=== Prize money ===
The total prize money for this tournament was US$250,000. Distribution of prize money was in accordance with BWF regulations.

Event	Winner	Finalist	Semi-finals	Quarter-finals	Last 16
Men's singles	$20,000	$10,000	$5,000	$2,500	$1,000
Women's singles	$17,250	$8,250	$4,500	$2,250	—N/a
Men's doubles	$18,000	$10,000	$6,000	$3,500	—N/a
Women's doubles	$15,250	$10,000	$5,500	$2,750	—N/a
Mixed doubles	$15,250	$10,000	$5,500	$2,750	—N/a

== Men's singles ==
=== Seeds ===
1. (China) Lin Dan (withdrew)
2. (China) Bao Chunlai (final)
3. (China) Chen Jin (first round)
4. (China) Chen Hong (semi-finals)
5. (Malaysia) Lee Chong Wei (champion)
6. (China) Chen Yu (withdrew)
7. (Denmark) Peter Gade (quarter-finals)
8. (Denmark) Kenneth Jonassen (second round)

=== Finals ===
Semi-finals
5	(Malaysia) Lee Chong Wei	23	21
4	(China) Chen Hong	21	10
(Indonesia) Taufik Hidayat	19	19
2	(China) Bao Chunlai	21	21

Final
5	(Malaysia) Lee Chong Wei	21	21
2	(China) Bao Chunlai	15	16

=== Top half ===
==== Section 1 ====
First Round
PFQ	(Czech Republic) J Fröhlich	19	29	13
(New Zealand) J Moody	21	27	21
(Netherlands) D Palyama	14	21	15
(Singapore) K Lee Y H	21	19	21'
5	(Malaysia) Lee C W	21	21
PFQ	(Malaysia) Kuan B H	16	13
(Malaysia) M H Hashim	17	16
(Indonesia) S Santoso	21	21

Second Round
(New Zealand) J Moody	21	9	16
(Singapore) K Lee Y H	18	21	21
5	(Malaysia) Lee C W	21	14	21
(Indonesia) S Santoso	17	21	15

Quarter-finals
(Singapore) K Lee Y H	11	17
5	(Malaysia) Lee C W	21	21

==== Section 2 ====
First Round
4	(China) Chen H	21	21
(Netherlands) E Pang	10	19
(Singapore) R Susilo	18	21	18
(Hong Kong) Ng W	21	18	21
8	(Denmark) K Jonassen	21	21
PFQ	(Malaysia) I Saman	13	12
(England) A Smith	18	18
Q2	(Indonesia) A K Tedjono	21	21

Second Round
4	(China) Chen H	19	21	21
(Hong Kong) Ng W	21	15	15
8	(Denmark) K Jonassen	25	15	15
Q2	(Indonesia) A K Tedjono	23	21	21

Quarter-finals
4	(China) Chen H	21	21
Q2	(Indonesia) A K Tedjono	9	15

=== Bottom half ===
==== Section 3 ====
First Round
(Hong Kong) Chan Y K	21	21
(Germany) B Joppien	19	18
(Indonesia) S D Kuncoro	21	21	21
PFQ	(Vietnam) Nguyễn T M	15	23	6
(Thailand) B Ponsana	14	24	21
Q3	(Indonesia) A Y W Hartanto	21	22	17
(Indonesia) T Hidayat	21	15	21
3	(China) Chen J	8	21	15

Second Round
(Hong Kong) Chan Y K	18	12
(Indonesia) S D Kuncoro	21	21
(Thailand) B Ponsana	14	22	14
(Indonesia) T Hidayat	21	20	21

Quarter-finals
(Indonesia) S D Kuncoro	17	17
(Indonesia) T Hidayat	21	21

==== Section 4 ====
First Round
(Malaysia) S A Ayob	25	21
(Wales) R Vaughan	23	13
Q1	(Indonesia) T Sugiarto	21	11	13
7	(Denmark) P Gade	19	21	21
(Japan) S Satō	15	21	21
Q4	(Indonesia) E S Pranoto	21	18	10
(Malaysia) Yeoh K B	11	21	12
2	(China) Bao CL	21	18	21

Second Round
(Malaysia) S A Ayob	12	13
7	(Denmark) P Gade	21	21
(Japan) S Satō	18	16
2	(China) Bao CL	21	21

Quarter-finals
7	(Denmark) P Gade	18	14
2	(China) Bao CL	21	21

== Women's singles ==
=== Seeds ===
1. (China) Xie Xingfang (second round)
2. (China) Zhang Ning (quarter-finals)
3. (China) Zhu Lin (final)
4. (China) Lu Lan (second round)
5. (Germany) Huaiwen Xu (quarter-finals)
6. (China) Jiang Yanjiao (withdrew)
7. (France) Pi Hongyan (semi-finals)
8. (Hong Kong) Wang Chen (champion)

=== Finals ===
Semi-finals
7	(France) Pi Hongyan	19	12
3	(China) Zhu Lin	21	21
(Bulgaria) Petya Nedelcheva	21	21	19
8	(Hong Kong) Wang Chen	23	14	21

Final
3	(China) Zhu Lin	14	13
8	(Hong Kong) Wang Chen	21	21

=== Top half ===
==== Section 1 ====
First Round
1	(China) Xie XF	21	24
(Malaysia) Wong M C	13	22
Q3	(Chinese Taipei) Cheng S-c	21	18	21
Q4	(Indonesia) M F Kusumastuti	19	21	14
7	(France) Pi HY	21	21
(Singapore) Li L	19	9
(Japan) E Hirose	21	21
(Japan) K Mori	11	17

Second Round
1	(China) Xie XF	18	16
Q3	(Chinese Taipei) Cheng S-c	21	21
7	(France) Pi HY	21	21
(Japan) E Hirose	13	12

Quarter-finals
Q3	(Chinese Taipei) Cheng S-c	17	21	15
7	(France) Pi HY	21	19	21

==== Section 2 ====
First Round
3	(China) Zhu L	21	21
Q2	(Indonesia) A Firdasari	18	8
(Netherlands) Yao J	21	21
(Russia) E Karachkova	12	17
5	(Germany) HW Xu	21	22
(South Korea) Hwang H-y	17	20
(Hong Kong) Yip P Y	21	24
(Germany) J Schenk	17	22

Second Round
3	(China) Zhu L	21	22
(Netherlands) Yao J	18	20
5	(Germany) HW Xu	21	22
(Hong Kong) Yip P Y	11	20

Quarter-finals
3	(China) Zhu L	17	21	21
5	(Germany) HW Xu	21	14	15

=== Bottom half ===
==== Section 3 ====
First Round
(Canada) A Rice	14	7
(Bulgaria) P Nedelcheva	21	21
(Singapore) Xing AY	22	18	16
PFQ	(Chinese Taipei) Pai M-j	20	21	21
(Indonesia) M K Yulianti	17	21	21
(Scotland) S Hughes	21	14	15
(Australia) Huang C-c	21	19	18
4	(China) Lu L	14	21	21

Second Round
(Bulgaria) P Nedelcheva	21	19	21
PFQ	(Chinese Taipei) Pai M-j	10	21	17
(Indonesia) M K Yulianti	15	21	21
4	(China) Lu L	21	16	14

Quarter-finals
(Bulgaria) P Nedelcheva	21	21
(Indonesia) M K Yulianti	13	11

==== Section 4 ====
First Round
(Denmark) T Rasmussen	21	21
(Finland) A Nieminen	13	12
(Netherlands) J Meulendijks	11	17
8	(Hong Kong) Wang C	21	21
(Sweden) S Persson	13	21	14
Q1	(Indonesia) P Z Bernadet	21	14	21
(Japan) Y Hirayama	13	10
2	(China) Zhang N	21	21

Second Round
(Denmark) T Rasmussen	19	5^{r}
8	(Hong Kong) Wang C	21	11
Q1	(Indonesia) P Z Bernadet	7	15
2	(China) Zhang N	21	21

Quarter-finals
8	(Hong Kong) Wang C	19	21	21
2	(China) Zhang N	21	13	17

== Men's doubles ==
=== Seeds ===
1. (China) Fu Haifeng / Cai Yun (champions)
2. (Denmark) Jens Eriksen / Martin Lundgaard Hansen (second round)
3. (Indonesia) Markis Kido / Hendra Setiawan (quarter-finals)
4. (Indonesia) Candra Wijaya / (United States) Tony Gunawan (semi-finals)
5. (Malaysia) Koo Kien Keat / Tan Boon Heong (semi-finals)
6. (Malaysia) Choong Tan Fook / Lee Wan Wah (quarter-finals)
7. (South Korea) Jung Jae-sung / Lee Jae-jin (second round)
8. (Indonesia) Rian Sukmawan / Eng Hian (first round)

=== Finals ===
Semi-finals
1	(China) Fu Haifeng (China) Cai Yun	17	21	21
5	(Malaysia) Koo Kien Keat (Malaysia) Tan Boon Heong	21	12	10
4	(Indonesia) Candra Wijaya (United States) Tony Gunawan	23	15	17
(Malaysia) Mohd Zakry Abdul Latif (Malaysia) Mohd Fairuzizuan Mohd Tazari	21	21	21

Final
1	(China) Fu Haifeng (China) Cai Yun	21	22
(Malaysia) Mohd Zakry Abdul Latif (Malaysia) Mohd Fairuzizuan Mohd Tazari	17	20

=== Top half ===
==== Section 1 ====
First Round
1	(China) Fu HF (China) Cai Y	21	21
PFQ	(Indonesia) U K Yoga (Indonesia) Y S Dasuki	19	15
Q4	(Indonesia) S Budiarto (Indonesia) F Kurniawan	21	21
(France) S Stoyanov (France) M Popov	13	17
6	(Malaysia) Choong T F (Malaysia) Lee W W	21	21
(Japan) T Ōtsuka (Japan) K Masuda	17	9
(Indonesia) L Hadiyanto (Indonesia) A Yulianto	21	21
(Wales) M Hughes (Wales) M Lewis	9	13

Second Round
1	(China) Fu HF (China) Cai Y	21	21
Q4	(Indonesia) S Budiarto (Indonesia) F Kurniawan	17	18
6	(Malaysia) Choong T F (Malaysia) Lee W W	21	21
(Indonesia) L Hadiyanto (Indonesia) A Yulianto	17	16

Quarter-finals
1	(China) Fu HF (China) Cai Y	21	21
6	(Malaysia) Choong T F (Malaysia) Lee W W	15	18

==== Section 2 ====
First Round
3	(Indonesia) M Kido (Indonesia) H Setiawan	21	21
(Singapore) H K Saputra (Singapore) H Wijaya	19	16
Q2	(China) Zhang J (China) Zheng B	12	9
(Indonesia) H A Gunawan (Indonesia) J Riyadi	21	21
5	(Malaysia) Koo K K (Malaysia) Tan B H	21	21
(Australia) A Brehaut (Australia) A B Sindoro	13	15
(Denmark) L Paaske (Denmark) J Rasmussen	21	17	21
(England) A Clark (England) R Blair	14	21	17

Second Round
3	(Indonesia) M Kido (Indonesia) H Setiawan	21	19	21
(Indonesia) H A Gunawan (Indonesia) J Riyadi	12	21	18
5	(Malaysia) Koo K K (Malaysia) Tan B H	21	21
(Denmark) L Paaske (Denmark) J Rasmussen	12	17

Quarter-finals
3	(Indonesia) M Kido (Indonesia) H Setiawan	15	16
5	(Malaysia) Koo K K (Malaysia) Tan B H	21	21

=== Bottom half ===
==== Section 3 ====
First Round
Q3	(China) Guo ZD (China) Xie ZB	21	18	'21
(Japan) S Sakamoto (Japan) S Ikeda	19	21	13
(Hong Kong) A S Njoto (Hong Kong) Y H Wiratama	21	21
8	(Indonesia) R Sukmawan (Indonesia) E Hian	17	10
(Malaysia) Gan T C (Malaysia) R Lin W F	21	21
Q1	(Germany) J Schöttler (Germany) T Dettmann	16	14
(Malaysia) Tan B S (Malaysia) Ong S H	13	16
4	(Indonesia) C Hijaya (United States) T Gunawan	21	21

Second Round
Q3	(China) Guo ZD (China) Xie ZB	21	21
(Hong Kong) A S Njoto (Hong Kong) Y H Wiratama	9	13
(Malaysia) Gan T C (Malaysia) R Lin W F	15	14
4	(Indonesia) C Hijaya (United States) T Gunawan	21	21

Quarter-finals
Q3	(China) Guo ZD (China) Xie ZB	15	15
4	(Indonesia) C Hijaya (United States) T Gunawan	21	21

==== Section 4 ====
First Round
(Malaysia) Chan C M (Malaysia) Hoon T H	21	21
(Poland) M Łogosz (Poland) R Mateusiak	14	12
(Russia) V Durkin (Russia) A Nikolaenko	18	14
7	(South Korea) Jung J-s (South Korea) Lee J-j	21	21
(Germany) R Spitko (Germany) M Fuchs	15	11
(Malaysia) M Z Abdul Latif (Malaysia) M F Mohd Tazari	21	21
(Germany) K Hopp (Germany) I Kindervater	9	18
2	(Denmark) J Eriksen (Denmark) M Lundgaard Hansen	21	21

Second Round
(Malaysia) Chan C M (Malaysia) Hoon T H	23	21
7	(South Korea) Jung J-s (South Korea) Lee J-j	21	17
(Malaysia) M Z Abdul Latif (Malaysia) M F Mohd Tazari	26	25
2	(Denmark) J Eriksen (Denmark) M Lundgaard Hansen	24	23

Quarter-finals
(Malaysia) Chan C M (Malaysia) Hoon T H	21	15	12
(Malaysia) M Z Abdul Latif (Malaysia) M F Mohd Tazari	17	21	21

== Women's doubles ==
=== Seeds ===
1. (China) Zhang Yawen / Wei Yili (quarter-finals)
2. (Chinese Taipei) Chien Yu-chin / Cheng Wen-hsing (first round)
3. (South Korea) Lee Kyung-won / Lee Hyo-jung (quarter-finals)
4. (Malaysia) Wong Pei Tty / Chin Eei Hui (quarter-finals)
5. (China) Gao Ling / Zhang Jiewen (semi-finals)
6. (Indonesia) Greysia Polii / Vita Marissa (second round)
7. (Singapore) Jiang Yanmei / Li Yujia (quarter-finals)
8. (Japan) Aki Akao / Tomomi Matsuda (first round)

=== Finals ===
Semi-finals
5	(China) Gao Ling (China) Zhang Jiewen	18	14
(China) Du Jing (China) Yu Yang	21	21
(China) Zhao Tingting (China) Yang Wei	21	21
(England) Gail Emms (England) Donna Kellogg	15	11

Final
(China) Du Jing (China) Yu Yang	21	16	22
(China) Zhao Tingting (China) Yang Wei	8	21	20

=== Top half ===
==== Section 1 ====
First Round
1	(China) Zhang YW (China) Wei YL	21	21
(England) J Nicholas (England) N Munt	10	12
(Japan) K Ogura (Japan) R Shiota	21	21
PFQ	(Canada) C Reid (Canada) F McKee	10	11
5	(China) Gao L (China) Zhang JW	21	21
(Russia) N Vislova (Russia) V Sorokina	10	14
(Sweden) J Persson (Sweden) E Bergblom	21	21
(Bulgaria) P Nedelcheva (Bulgaria) D Dimova	13	15

Second Round
1	(China) Zhang YW (China) Wei YL	21	21
(Japan) K Ogura (Japan) R Shiota	18	13
5	(China) Gao L (China) Zhang JW	21	21
(Sweden) J Persson (Sweden) E Bergblom	14	15

Quarter-finals
1	(China) Zhang YW (China) Wei YL	21	16	12
5	(China) Gao L (China) Zhang JW	17	21	21

==== Section 2 ====
First Round
3	(South Korea) Lee K-w (South Korea) Lee H-j	21	21
(Poland) K Augustyn (Poland) N Kostiuczyk	6	10
(Scotland) I Bankier (Scotland) E Mason
Q2	(Chinese Taipei) Chou C-c (Chinese Taipei) Ku P-t	w	/	o
8	(Japan) A Akao (Japan) T Matsuda	15	9
(China) Du J (China) Yu Y	21	21
Q1	(Indonesia) L Nurlita (Indonesia) N C Poluakan	21	21
(France) É Eymard (France) W Rahmawati	18	12

Second Round
3	(South Korea) Lee K-w (South Korea) Lee H-j	21	21
Q2	(Chinese Taipei) Chou C-c (Chinese Taipei) Ku P-t	12	16
(China) Du J (China) Yu Y	21	21
Q1	(Indonesia) L Nurlita (Indonesia) N C Poluakan	9	10

Quarter-finals
3	(South Korea) Lee K-w (South Korea) Lee H-j	19	16
(China) Du J (China) Yu Y	21	21

=== Bottom half ===
==== Section 3 ====
First Round
(China) Zhao TT (China) Yang W	21	21
(Thailand) D Aroonkesorn (Thailand) K Voravichitchaikul	9	8
Q4	(Malaysia) Mooi H Y (Malaysia) Ooi Y H	10	7
6	(Indonesia) G Polii (Indonesia) V Marissa	21	21
(Russia) A Russkikh (Russia) E Ananina	15	14
(Indonesia) E Nurgianti (Indonesia) R Mundiasti	21	21
(Denmark) L Frier Kristiansen (Denmark) H Neilsen	21	19	18
4	(Malaysia) Wong P T (Malaysia) Chin E H	18	21	21

Second Round
(China) Zhao TT (China) Yang W	21	20	21
6	(Indonesia) G Polii (Indonesia) V Marissa	10	22	9
(Indonesia) E Nurgianti (Indonesia) R Mundiasti	16	12
4	(Malaysia) Wong P T (Malaysia) Chin E H	21	21

Quarter-finals
(China) Zhao TT (China) Yang W	21	21
4	(Malaysia) Wong P T (Malaysia) Chin E H	15	17

==== Section 4 ====
First Round
(Japan) M Maeda (Japan) S Suetsuna	18	21	15
(Germany) N Grether (Germany) J Schenk	21	15	21
(South Korea) Ha J-e (South Korea) Kim M-j	13	21	19
7	(Singapore) Jiang YM (Singapore) Li YJ	21	14	21
Q3	(Indonesia) N K Maheswari (Indonesia) N Melati	21	22
PFQ	(Germany) B Overzier (Germany) C Mette	16	20
(England) G Emms (England) D Kellogg	22	12	21
2	(Chinese Taipei) Chien Y-c (Chinese Taipei) Cheng W-h	20	21	17

Second Round
(Germany) N Grether (Germany) J Schenk	14	23	8
7	(Singapore) Jiang YM (Singapore) Li YJ	21	21	21
Q3	(Indonesia) N K Maheswari (Indonesia) N Melati	14	13
(England) G Emms (England) D Kellogg	21	21

Quarter-finals
7	(Singapore) Jiang YM (Singapore) Li YJ	10	17
(England) G Emms (England) D Kellogg	21	21

== Mixed doubles ==
=== Seeds ===
1. (Indonesia) Nova Widianto / Liliyana Natsir (final)
2. (China) Xie Zhongbo / Zhang Yawen (quarter-finals)
3. (Thailand) Sudket Prapakamol / Saralee Thungthongkam (second round)
4. (England) Nathan Robertson / Gail Emms (second round)
5. (China) Zheng Bo / Gao Ling (champions)
6. (China) He Hanbin / Yu Yang (semi-finals)
7. (Indonesia) Flandy Limpele / Vita Marissa (first round)
8. (England) Anthony Clark / Donna Kellogg (quarter-finals)

=== Finals ===
Semi-finals
1	(Indonesia) Nova Widianto (Indonesia) Liliyana Natsir	21	21
(South Korea) Lee Jae-jin (South Korea) Lee Hyo-jung	17	14
6	(China) He Hanbin (China) Yu Yang	15	13
5	(China) Zheng Bo (China) Gao Ling	21	21

Final
1	(Indonesia) Nova Widianto (Indonesia) Liliyana Natsir	16	11
5	(China) Zheng Bo (China) Gao Ling	21	21

=== Top half ===
==== Section 1 ====
First Round
1	(Indonesia) N Widianto (Indonesia) L Natsir	21	14	21
(Indonesia) M Rijal (Indonesia) G Polii	19	21	17
Q4	(Indonesia) D L Fitriawan (Indonesia) L Nurlita	13	21	21
(Denmark) J Rasmussen (Denmark) L Frier Kristiansen	21	11	19
8	(England) A Clark (England) D Kellogg	21	21
(Russia) V Durkin (Russia) V Sorokina	10	11
(Denmark) L Paaske (Denmark) M Schjoldager	21	27
(Thailand) S Anugritayawon (Thailand) K Voravichitchaikul	8	25

Second Round
1	(Indonesia) N Widianto (Indonesia) L Natsir	21	18	21
Q4	(Indonesia) D L Fitriawan (Indonesia) L Nurlita	15	21	15
8	(England) A Clark (England) D Kellogg	21	21
(Denmark) L Paaske (Denmark) M Schjoldager	18	18

Quarter-finals
1	(Indonesia) N Widianto (Indonesia) L Natsir	12	21	21
8	(England) A Clark (England) D Kellogg	21	19	18

==== Section 2 ====
First Round
3	(Thailand) S Prapakamol (Thailand) S Thungthongkam	21	21
(France) S Stoyanov (France) É Eymard	15	17
Q3	(Chinese Taipei) Tsai C-h (Chinese Taipei) Cheng S-c	14	17
Q1	(South Korea) Han S-h (South Korea) Hwang Y-m	21	21
7	(Indonesia) F Limpele (Indonesia) V Marissa	21	18	12
(South Korea) Lee J-j (South Korea) Lee H-j	11	21	21
(Russia) A Nikolaenko (Russia) N Vislova	14	21	15
(Poland) M Łogosz (England) N Munt	21	17	21

Second Round
3	(Thailand) S Prapakamol (Thailand) S Thungthongkam	18	21	18
Q1	(South Korea) Han S-h (South Korea) Hwang Y-m	21	13	21
(South Korea) Lee J-j (South Korea) Lee H-j	21	21
(Poland) M Łogosz (England) N Munt	15	9

Quarter-finals
Q1	(South Korea) Han S-h (South Korea) Hwang Y-m	15	4
(South Korea) Lee J-j (South Korea) Lee H-j	21	21

=== Bottom half ===
==== Section 3 ====
First Round
(Singapore) H Wijaya (Singapore) Jiang YM	21	22
(Indonesia) L Lie (Indonesia) N K Maheswari	17	20
(England) R Blair (Scotland) I Bankier
6	(China) He HB (China) Yu Y	w	/	o
Q2	(Scotland) K Turnbull (Russia) E Karachkova	10	11
(China) Zhang J (China) Zhao TT	21	21
(Germany) I Kindervater (Germany) K Piotrowski	15	21	18
4	(England) N Robertson (England) G Emms	21	18	21

Second Round
(Singapore) H Wijaya (Singapore) Jiang YM	14	10
6	(China) He HB (China) Yu Y	21	21
(China) Zhang J (China) Zhao TT	21	22
4	(England) N Robertson (England) G Emms	18	20

Quarter-finals
6	(China) He HB (China) Yu Y	21	16	21
(China) Zhang J (China) Zhao TT	17	21	12

==== Section 4 ====
First Round
(Philippines) Kennevic Asuncion (Philippines) Kennie Asuncion	16	9
PFQ	(Denmark) J Eriksen (Denmark) H Nielsen	21	21
(Germany) K Hopp (Germany) B Overzier	15	9
5	(China) Zheng B (China) Gao L	21	21
(Germany) T Dettmann (Germany) A Lillie	13	10
(Singapore) H Saputra (Singapore) Li YJ	21	21
(Poland) R Mateusiak (Poland) N Kostiuczyk	19	16
2	(China) Xie ZB (China) Zhang YW	21	21

Second Round
PFQ	(Denmark) J Eriksen (Denmark) H Nielsen	17	14
5	(China) Zheng B (China) Gao L	21	21
(Singapore) H Saputra (Singapore) Li YJ	16	21	10
2	(China) Xie ZB (China) Zhang YW	21	16	21

Quarter-finals
5	(China) Zheng B (China) Gao L	21	21
2	(China) Xie ZB (China) Zhang YW	15	17
