= 2008 Hong Kong Super Series =

2008 Hong Kong Open Super Series
Tournament details
- Dates: November 24, 2008 - November 30, 2008
- Total prize money: US$250,000
- Venue: Queen Elizabeth Stadium
- Location: Wan Chai, Hong Kong

The 2008 Hong Kong Super Series is the twelfth tournament of the 2008 BWF Super Series in badminton. It was held in Wan Chai, Hong Kong from 24 to 30 November 2008.

== Men's singles ==
=== Results ===
Quarterfinals
(Thailand) Boonsak Ponsana	28	20	21
(India) Arvind Bhat	26	22	14
(China) Chen Jin 3	21	21
(China) Gong Weijie PFQ	8	10
(Indonesia) Taufik Hidayat 7	21	21
(Hong Kong) Wong Wing Ki Q	15	19
(South Korea) Park Sung-hwan 8	16	21	13
(China) Lin Dan 2	21	14	21

Semifinals
(Thailand) Boonsak Ponsana	15	16
(China) Chen Jin 3	21	21
(Indonesia) Taufik Hidayat 7	17	14
(China) Lin Dan 2	21	21

Finals
(China) Chen Jin 3	21	9	21
(China) Lin Dan 2	9	21	17

== Women's singles ==
=== Results ===
Quarterfinals
(South Korea) Hwang Hye-youn	16	13
(China) Zhu Lin	21	22
(China) Xie Xingfang 4	21	21
(Bulgaria) Petya Nedelcheva	16	12
(Hong Kong) Wang Chen	27	14	21
(India) Saina Nehwal	25	21	15
(Hong Kong) Yip Pui Yin	21	16	14
(Hong Kong) Zhou Mi 2	13	21	21

Semifinals
(China) Zhu Lin 5	13	9
(China) Xie Xingfang 4	21	21
(Hong Kong) Wang Chen	12	21	21
(Hong Kong) Zhou Mi 2	21	17	18

Finals
(China) Xie Xingfang 4	16	21	10
(Hong Kong) Wang Chen	21	10	21

== Men's doubles ==
=== Results ===
Quarterfinals
1	(Indonesia) Markis Kido (Indonesia) Hendra Setiawan	11	17
5	(Malaysia) Koo Kien Keat (Malaysia) Tan Boon Heong	21	21
4	(Malaysia) Mohd Zakry Abdul Latif (Malaysia) Mohd Fairuzizuan Mohd Tazari	21	16	21
6	(South Korea) Cho Gun-woo (South Korea) Yoo Yeon-seong	16	21	15
8	(China) Guo Zhendong (China) Xu Chen	13	16
3	(South Korea) Jung Jae-sung (South Korea) Lee Yong-dae	21	21
x	(Malaysia) Chan Chong Ming (Malaysia) Chew Choon Eng	26	19	18
Q	(England) Anthony Clark (England) Nathan Robertson	24	21	21

Semifinals
5	(Malaysia) Koo Kien Keat (Malaysia) Tan Boon Heong	21	13	20
4	(Malaysia) Mohd Zakry Abdul Latif (Malaysia) Mohd Fairuzizuan Mohd Tazari	12	21	22
3	(South Korea) Jung Jae-sung (South Korea) Lee Yong-dae	21	21
Q	(England) Anthony Clark (England) Nathan Robertson	19	17

Finals
3	(South Korea) Jung Jae-sung (South Korea) Lee Yong-dae	25	19	22
4	(Malaysia) Mohd Zakry Abdul Latif (Malaysia) Mohd Fairuzizuan Mohd Tazari	23	21	20

== Women's doubles ==
=== Results ===
Quarterfinals
x	(Hong Kong) Chan Tsz Ka (Hong Kong) Tse Ying Suet	13	16
8	(China) Cheng Shu (China) Zhao Yunlei	21	21
4	(Indonesia) Vita Marissa (Indonesia) Lilyana Natsir	13	21	13
7	(South Korea) Ha Jung-eun (South Korea) Kim Min-jung	21	18	21
5	(China) Zhang Yawen (China) Zhao Tingting	21	21
x	(Malaysia) Haw Chiou Hwee (Malaysia) Lim Pek Siah	12	10
6	(Denmark) Lena Frier Kristiansen (Denmark) Kamilla Rytter Juhl	14	15
2	(Malaysia) Chin Eei Hui (Malaysia) Wong Pei Tty	21	21

Semifinals
8	(China) Cheng Shu (China) Zhao Yunlei	21	21
7	(South Korea) Ha Jung-eun (South Korea) Kim Min-jung	14	13
5	(China) Zhang Yawen (China) Zhao Tingting	21	21
2	(Malaysia) Chin Eei Hui (Malaysia) Wong Pei Tty	13	9

Finals
8	(China) Cheng Shu (China) Zhao Yunlei	14	13
5	(China) Zhang Yawen (China) Zhao Tingting	21	21

== Mixed doubles ==
=== Results ===
Quarterfinals
1	(Indonesia) Nova Widianto (Indonesia) Lilyana Natsir	16	19
7	(China) Xie Zhongbo (China) Zhang Yawen	21	21
x	(Malaysia) Koo Kien Keat (Malaysia) Ng Hui Lin	18	12
x	(China) Zheng Bo (China) Ma Jin	21	21
6	(Denmark) Thomas Laybourn (Denmark) Kamilla Rytter Juhl	17	21	21
x	(South Korea) Yoo Yeon-seong (South Korea) Kim Min-jung	21	17	19
5	(South Korea) Lee Yong-dae (South Korea) Lee Hyo-jung	11	21	21
2	(China) He Hanbin (China) Yu Yang	21	16	12

Semifinals
7	(China) Xie Zhongbo (China) Zhang Yawen	21	21
x	(China) Zheng Bo (China) Ma Jin	14	17
6	(Denmark) Thomas Laybourn (Denmark) Kamilla Rytter Juhl	16	16
5	(South Korea) Lee Yong-dae (South Korea) Lee Hyo-jung	21	21

Finals
7	(China) Xie Zhongbo (China) Zhang Yawen	21	21
5	(South Korea) Lee Yong-dae (South Korea) Lee Hyo-jung	14	16
