= 2008 Singapore Super Series =

Badminton championships

Tournament details
- Dates: 10 June 2008– 15 June 2008
- Edition: 59th
- Level: Super Series
- Total prize money: US$200,000
- Venue: Singapore Indoor Stadium
- Location: Kallang, Singapore

Champions
- Men's singles: (Malaysia) Lee Chong Wei
- Women's singles: (Denmark) Tine Rasmussen
- Men's doubles: (Malaysia) Mohd Zakry Abdul Latif (Malaysia) Mohd Fairuzizuan Mohd Tazari
- Women's doubles: (China) Du Jing (China) Yu Yang
- Mixed doubles: (Indonesia) Nova Widianto (Indonesia) Liliyana Natsir

The 2008 Singapore Super Series was the fifth tournament of 2008 BWF Super Series badminton tournament. It was held from June 10 to June 15, 2008, at the Singapore Indoor Stadium in Singapore.

== Final results ==
Category	Champion	Runners-up	Score	Match duration
Men's Singles	(Malaysia) Lee Chong Wei	(Indonesia) Simon Santoso	21–13, 21–5	0:29
Women's Singles	(Denmark) Tine Rasmussen	(Hong Kong) Zhou Mi	21–19, 21–17	0:36
Men's Doubles	(Malaysia) Mohd Zakry Abdul Latif (Malaysia) Mohd Fairuzizuan Mohd Tazari	(Malaysia) Gan Teik Chai (Malaysia) Lin Woon Fui	21–18, 21–17	0:33
Women's Doubles	(China) Jing Du (China) Yang Yu	(Chinese Taipei) Wen Hsing Cheng (Chinese Taipei) Yu Chin Chien	21–16, 21–19	0:37
Mixed Doubles	(Indonesia) Nova Widianto (Indonesia) Liliyana Natsir	(England) Anthony Clark (England) Donna Kellogg	17–21, 21–14, 21–9	0:50

== Men's singles ==
Semifinals
(Malaysia) Lee Chong Wei	21	21
(Denmark) Peter Gade	18	13
(Indonesia) Simon Santoso	21	21
(England) Andrew Smith	11	14

Final
(Malaysia) Lee Chong Wei	21	21
(Indonesia) Simon Santoso	13	5

== Women's singles ==
Semifinals
(India) Saina Nehwal	21	19	11
(Hong Kong) Zhou Mi	17	21	21
(Malaysia) Wong Mew Choo	10	22
(Denmark) Tine Rasmussen	21	22

Final
(Hong Kong) Zhou Mi	19	17
(Denmark) Tine Rasmussen	21	21

== Men's doubles ==
Semifinals
(Malaysia) Gan Teik Chai (Malaysia) Lin Woon Fui	21	21
(Malaysia) Mohd Razif Abdul Latif (Malaysia) Tan Wee Kiong	16	16
(South Korea) Cho Gun-woo (South Korea) Yoo Yeon-seong	17	15
(Malaysia) Mohd Zakry Abdul Latif (Malaysia) Mohd Fairuzizuan Mohd Tazari	21	21

Final
(Malaysia) Gan Teik Chai (Malaysia) Lin Woon Fui	18	17
(Malaysia) Mohd Zakry Abdul Latif (Malaysia) Mohd Fairuzizuan Mohd Tazari	21	21

== Women's doubles ==
Semifinals
(China) Du Jing (China) Yu Yang	21	21
(South Korea) Ha Jung-eun (South Korea) Kim Min-jung	19	14
(Indonesia) Vita Marissa (Indonesia) Liliyana Natsir	22	12	16
(Chinese Taipei) Cheng Wen-Hsing (Chinese Taipei) Chien Yu Chin	20	21	21

Final
(China) Du Jing (China) Yu Yang	21	21
(Chinese Taipei) Cheng Wen-Hsing (Chinese Taipei) Chien Yu Chin	16	19

== Mixed doubles ==
Semifinals
(Indonesia) Nova Widianto (Indonesia) Liliyana Natsir	21	21
(Thailand) Songphon Anugritayawon (Thailand) Kunchala Voravichitchaikul	18	19
(Denmark) Rasmus Bonde (Denmark) Helle Nielsen	16	18
(England) Anthony Clark (England) Donna Kellogg	21	21

Final
(Indonesia) Nova Widianto (Indonesia) Liliyana Natsir	17	21	21
(England) Anthony Clark (England) Donna Kellogg	21	14	9
