= 2008 Indonesia Super Series =

Tournament details
- Dates: 16–22 June
- Edition: 27th
- Total prize money: US$250,000
- Venue: Istora Gelora Bung Karno
- Location: Jakarta, Indonesia

Champions
- Men's singles: (Indonesia) Sony Dwi Kuncoro
- Women's singles: (China) Zhu Lin
- Men's doubles: (Malaysia) Mohd Zakry Abdul Latif (Malaysia) Mohd Fairuzizuan Mohd Tazari
- Women's doubles: (Indonesia) Vita Marissa (Indonesia) Lilyana Natsir
- Mixed doubles: (China) Zheng Bo (China) Gao Ling

The 2008 Indonesia Open Superseries in badminton is the sixth tournament of the 2008 BWF Superseries. It was held in Jakarta from 16 to 22 June 2008.

== Men's singles ==
=== Seeds ===
1. (Malaysia) Lee Chong Wei (withdrew)
2. (China) Bao Chunlai (semifinals)
3. (China) Chen Jin (withdrew)
4. (Indonesia) Sony Dwi Kuncoro (champion)
5. (Indonesia) Taufik Hidayat (withdrew)
6. (Denmark) Peter Gade (second round)
7. (Poland) Przemysław Wacha (quarterfinals)
8. (Indonesia) Simon Santoso (final)

=== Finals ===
Semi-finals
PFQ	(Japan) Kenichi Tago	16	21	18
8	(Indonesia) Simon Santoso	21	13	21
4	(Indonesia) Sony Dwi Kuncoro	15	21	21
2	(China) Bao Chunlai	21	13	16

Final
8	(Indonesia) Simon Santoso	21	14	9
4	(Indonesia) Sony Dwi Kuncoro	19	21	21

=== Top half ===
==== Section 1 ====
First Round
PFQ	(Japan) K Tago	21	21
(Malaysia) M H Hashim	17	14
(Hong Kong) Ng Wei	22	21
(Indonesia) A K Tedjono	20	14
6	(Denmark) P Gade	11
PFQ	(Republic of Ireland) S Evans	1^{r}
Q3	(South Korea) Lee C-h	27	18
PFQ	(Denmark) J Ø. Jørgensen	29	21

Second Round
PFQ	(Japan) K Tago	21	21
(Hong Kong) Ng Wei	10	18
6	(Denmark) P Gade	19	21	17
PFQ	(Denmark) J Ø. Jørgensen	21	13	21

Quarter-finals
PFQ	(Japan) K Tago	21	17	21
PFQ	(Denmark) J Ø. Jørgensen	16	21	14

==== Section 2 ====
First Round
PFQ	(Indonesia) T Sugiarto	25	17
(Malaysia) Lee T S	27	21
(Singapore) K Lee Y-h	21	21
(Japan) S Sasaki	19	18
8	(Indonesia) S Santoso	21	21
(Czech Republic) P Koukal	9	12
(Malaysia) Yeoh K B	17	20
(Netherlands) D Palyama	21	22

Second Round
(Malaysia) Lee T S	21	22
(Singapore) K Lee Y-h	15	20
8	(Indonesia) S Santoso	22	21
(Netherlands) D Palyama	20	9

Quarter-finals
(Malaysia) Lee T S	15	16
8	(Indonesia) S Santoso	21	21

=== Bottom half ===
==== Section 3 ====
First Round
Q4	(Indonesia) I Chandra	15	18
(Singapore) R Susilo	21	21
Q1	(Indonesia) A Yunus	23	20	21
PFQ	(India) A Bhat	21	22	12
(India) A Sridhar	23	9	14
(Denmark) J Persson	21	21	21
Q2	(Indonesia) A Hartanto	18	13
4	(Indonesia) S D Kuncoro	21	21

Second Round
(Singapore) R Susilo	21	18	21
Q1	(Indonesia) A Yunus	18	21	6
(Denmark) J Persson	18	21	19
4	(Indonesia) S D Kuncoro	21	16	21

Quarter-finals
(Singapore) R Susilo	15	12
4	(Indonesia) S D Kuncoro	21	21

==== Section 4 ====
First Round
(Hong Kong) Chan Y K	19	21	17
(Malaysia) S A Ayob	21	18	21
(Netherlands) E Pang	21	22	19
7	(Poland) P Wacha	18	24	21
(Japan) S Satō	7^{r}
(Vietnam) Nguyễn T M	21
(Malaysia) M R Hashim	11	16
2	(China) Bao CL	21	21

Second Round
(Malaysia) S A Ayob	22	17	17
7	(Poland) P Wacha	20	21	21
(Vietnam) Nguyễn T M	21	14	17
2	(China) Bao CL	17	21	21

Quarter-finals
7	(Poland) P Wacha	12	16
2	(China) Bao CL	21	21

== Women's singles ==
=== Seeds ===
1. (China) Zhu Lin (champions)
2. (China) Zhang Ning (semifinals)
3. (France) Pi Hongyan (semifinals)
4. (Denmark) Tine Rasmussen (first round)
5. (Hong Kong) Wang Chen (quarterfinals)
6. (Malaysia) Wong Mew Choo (withdrew)
7. (Hong Kong) Zhou Mi (quarterfinals)
8. (Hong Kong) Yip Pui Yin (second round)

=== Finals ===
Semi-finals
1	(China) Zhu Lin	17	21	21
3	(France) Pi Hongyan	21	16	16
(Indonesia) Maria Kristin Yulianti	21	20	22
2	(China) Zhang Ning	14	22	20

Final
1	(China) Zhu Lin	21	17	21
(Indonesia) Maria Kristin Yulianti	18	21	14

=== Top half ===
==== Section 1 ====
First Round
1	(China) Zhu L	21	21
(Russia) E Diehl	10	6
(South Korea) Jang S-y	21	21
(Canada) C Reid	9	18
5	(Hong Kong) Wang C	21	21
(Bulgaria) P Nedelcheva	8	13
(South Korea) Lee Y-h	21	21
(Canada) A Rice	14	19

Second Round
1	(China) Zhu L	21	21
(South Korea) Jang S-y	11	12
5	(Hong Kong) Wang C	21	21
(South Korea) Lee Y-h	11	10

Quarter-finals
1	(China) Zhu L	17	2
5	(Hong Kong) Wang C	21	6^{r}

==== Section 2 ====
First Round
3	(France) Pi HY	19	21	22
Q1	(Indonesia) M F Kusumastuti	21	15	20
Q4	(Indonesia) R Y Pungkasari	12	14
(India) S Nehwal	21	21
8	(Hong Kong) Yip P Y	24	21
Q2	(Singapore) Gu J	22	11
(Singapore) Xing AY	21	21
(Finland) A Nieminen	13	12

Second Round
3	(France) Pi HY	12	21	21
(India) S Nehwal	21	18	16
8	(Hong Kong) Yip P Y	13	21
(Singapore) Xing AY	21	21

Quarter-finals
3	(France) Pi HY	21	18	21
(Singapore) Xing AY	18	21	8

=== Bottom half ===
==== Section 3 ====
First Round
(Indonesia) A Firdasari	15	16
(South Korea) Hwang H-y	21	21
(England) E Cann	17	9
7	(Hong Kong) Zhou M	21	21
Q3	(Indonesia) P Z Bernadet	19	20
(Indonesia) M K Yulianti	21	22
(Netherlands) Yao J	21
4	(Denmark) T Rasmussen	17^{r}

Second Round
(South Korea) Hwang H-y	11	24	14
7	(Hong Kong) Zhou M	21	22	21
(Indonesia) M K Yulianti	21	21
(Netherlands) Yao J	14	19

Quarter-finals
7	(Hong Kong) Zhou M	17	21	16
(Indonesia) M K Yulianti	21	15	21

==== Section 4 ====
First Round
(Indonesia) M E Christina	22	4	17
(Thailand) S Ponsana	20	21	21
(Japan) Y Hirayama	21	21
PFQ	(Slovenia) M Tvrdy	10	8
(Japan) E Hirose	22	10	17
(Netherlands) J Meulendijks	20	21	21
(Russia) E Ananina	11	17
2	(China) Zhang N	21	21

Second Round
(Thailand) S Ponsana	21	20
(Japan) Y Hirayama	13	18^{r}
(Netherlands) J Meulendijks	16	10
2	(China) Zhang N	21	21

Quarter-finals
(Thailand) S Ponsana	14	19
2	(China) Zhang N	21	21

== Men's doubles ==
=== Seeds ===
1. (Indonesia) Markis Kido / Hendra Setiawan (quarterfinals)
2. (China) Cai Yun / Fu Haifeng (withdrew)
3. (Indonesia) Alvent Yulianto / Luluk Hadiyanto (second round)
4. (Japan) Shintaro Ikeda / Shuichi Sakamoto (second round)
5. (United States) Tony Gunawan / (Indonesia) Candra Wijaya (final)
6. (Japan) Keita Masuda / Tadashi Ōtsuka (quarterfinals)
7. (Denmark) Mathias Boe / Carsten Mogensen (quarterfinals)
8. (Malaysia) Mohd Zakry Abdul Latif / Mohd Fairuzizuan Mohd Tazari (champions)

=== Finals ===
Semi-finals
5	(United States) Tony Gunawan (Indonesia) Candra Wijaya	23	21	21
(Malaysia) Hoon Thien How (Malaysia) Ong Soon Hock	25	15	15
(South Korea) Ko Sung-hyun (South Korea) Kwon Yi-goo	13	18
8	(Malaysia) Mohd Zakry Abdul Latif (Malaysia) Mohd Fairuzizuan Mohd Tazari	21	21

Final
5	(United States) Tony Gunawan (Indonesia) Candra Wijaya	21	18	14
8	(Malaysia) Mohd Zakry Abdul Latif (Malaysia) Mohd Fairuzizuan Mohd Tazari	19	21	21

=== Top half ===
==== Section 1 ====
First Round
1	(Indonesia) M Kido (Indonesia) H Setiawan	21	21
(Malaysia) Gan T C (Malaysia) Lin W F	16	17
(Malaysia) Chan C M (Malaysia) Chew C E	21	17	21
Q3	(Indonesia) R Agung (Indonesia) I S Irawan	17	21	16
5	(United States) T Gunawan (Indonesia) C Wijaya	21	21
(Hong Kong) A S Njoto (Hong Kong) Y H Wiratama	13	11
PFQ	(Indonesia) A Saputra (Indonesia) R Y Kresnayadi	21	21
(Indonesia) Y S Dasuki (Indonesia) R Sukmawan	19	17

Second Round
1	(Indonesia) M Kido (Indonesia) H Setiawan	21	17	21
(Malaysia) Chan C M (Malaysia) Chew C E	12	21	16
5	(United States) T Gunawan (Indonesia) C Wijaya	21	21
PFQ	(Indonesia) A Saputra (Indonesia) R Y Kresnayadi	10	12

Quarter-finals
1	(Indonesia) M Kido (Indonesia) H Setiawan	18	21	10
5	(United States) T Gunawan (Indonesia) C Wijaya	21	18	21

==== Section 2 ====
First Round
4	(Japan) S Ikeda (Japan) S Sakamoto	21	21
(Malaysia) M Razif A L (Malaysia) Tan W K	18	7
(Malaysia) Hoon T H (Malaysia) Ong S H	17	21	21
Q1	(Indonesia) F Kurniawan (Indonesia) L Lie	21	12	11
7	(Denmark) M Boe (Denmark) C Mogensen	21	21
Q4	(Chinese Taipei) Chen H-l (Chinese Taipei) Lu C-y	13	12
(Malaysia) Khoo C C (Malaysia) Tan B S	21	21
PFQ	(Indonesia) S Bagus (Indonesia) A B Sindoro	17	12

Second Round
4	(Japan) S Ikeda (Japan) S Sakamoto	23	23	19
(Malaysia) Hoon T H (Malaysia) Ong S H	25	21	21
7	(Denmark) M Boe (Denmark) C Mogensen	21	24	23
(Malaysia) Khoo C C (Malaysia) Tan B S	9	26	21

Quarter-finals
(Malaysia) Hoon T H (Malaysia) Ong S H	27	20	22
7	(Denmark) M Boe (Denmark) C Mogensen	25	22	20

=== Bottom half ===
==== Section 3 ====
First Round
(Denmark) R Bonde (Denmark) K Henriksen	16	21	21
(England) C Langridge (England) D Lindley	21	17	18
(Indonesia) F Kurniawan (Indonesia) R Wijaya	18	14
6	(Japan) K Masuda (Japan) T Ōtsuka	21	21
(South Korea) Ko S-h (South Korea) Kwon Y-g	21	23
(Thailand) S Anugritayawon (Thailand) T Panvisvas	14	21
(Denmark) J Chemnitz (Denmark) M D Larsen	13	5
3	(Indonesia) A Yulianto (Indonesia) L Hadiyanto	21	21

Second Round
(Denmark) R Bonde (Denmark) K Henriksen	14	12
6	(Japan) K Masuda (Japan) T Ōtsuka	21	21
(South Korea) Ko S-h (South Korea) Kwon Y-g	21	18	21
3	(Indonesia) A Yulianto (Indonesia) L Hadiyanto	17	21	17

Quarter-finals
6	(Japan) K Masuda (Japan) T Ōtsuka	7	16
(South Korea) Ko S-h (South Korea) Kwon Y-g	21	21

==== Section 4 ====
First Round
(South Korea) Cho G-w (South Korea) Yoo Y-s	21	21
(England) C Adcock (England) R Blair	15	10
(Malaysia) Chan P S (Malaysia) Lim K W	19	11
8	(Malaysia) M Zakry A L (Malaysia) M Fairuzizuan M T	21	21
(Denmark) A Kristiansen (Denmark) S Mollyhus	18	12
(Indonesia) M Ahsan (Indonesia) B Septano	21	21
Q2	(Indonesia) C A Wijaya (Indonesia) R S Syahmie	21	20	21
PFQ	(Germany) D Gunawi (Austria) P Zauner	14	22	14

Second Round
(South Korea) Cho G-w (South Korea) Yoo Y-s	21	21	15
8	(Malaysia) M Zakry A L (Malaysia) M Fairuzizuan M T	14	23	21
(Indonesia) M Ahsan (Indonesia) B Septano	21	21
Q2	(Indonesia) C A Wijaya (Indonesia) R S Syahmie	14	14

Quarter-finals
8	(Malaysia) M Zakry A L (Malaysia) M Fairuzizuan M T	21	21
(Indonesia) M Ahsan (Indonesia) B Septano	12	12

== Women's doubles ==
=== Seeds ===
1. (China) Wei Yili / Zhang Yawen (semifinals)
2. (Japan) Kumiko Ogura / Reiko Shiota (second round)
3. (Japan) Miyuki Maeda / Satoko Suetsuna (final)
4. (Indonesia) Vita Marissa / Liliyana Natsir (champions)
5. (Malaysia) Chin Eei Hui / Wong Pei Tty (quarterfinals)
6. (Denmark) Lena Frier Kristiansen / Kamilla Rytter Juhl (second round)
7. (Indonesia) Jo Novita / Greysia Polii (quarterfinals)
8. (South Korea) Ha Jung-eun / Kim Min-jung (quarterfinals)

=== Finals ===
Semi-finals
1	(China) Wei Yili (China) Zhang Yawen	15	21	18
4	(Indonesia) Vita Marissa (Indonesia) Liliyana Natsir	21	14	21
3	(Japan) Miyuki Maeda (Japan) Satoko Suetsuna	21	21
(Indonesia) Shendy Puspa Irawati (Indonesia) Meiliana Jauhari	19	15

Final
4	(Indonesia) Vita Marissa (Indonesia) Liliyana Natsir	21	21
3	(Japan) Miyuki Maeda (Japan) Satoko Suetsuna	15	14

== Mixed doubles ==
=== Seeds ===
1. (Indonesia) Nova Widianto / Liliyana Natsir (semifinals)
2. (China) Zheng Bo / Gao Ling (champions)
3. (Indonesia) Flandy Limpele / Vita Marissa (semifinals)
4. (Denmark) Thomas Laybourn / Kamilla Rytter Juhl (final)
5. (Poland) Robert Mateusiak / Nadieżda Kostiuczyk (withdrew)
6. (Chinese Taipei) Chen Hung-ling / Chou Chia-chi (first round)
7. (England) Robert Blair / (Scotland) Imogen Bankier (quarterfinals)
8. (Japan) Keita Masuda / Miyuki Maeda (second round)

=== Finals ===
Semi-finals
1	(Indonesia) Nova Widianto (Indonesia) Liliyana Natsir	20	20
4	(Denmark) Thomas Laybourn (Denmark) Kamilla Rytter Juhl	22	22
3	(Indonesia) Flandy Limpele (Indonesia) Vita Marissa	17	9
2	(China) Zheng Bo (China) Gao Ling	21	21

Final
4	(Denmark) Thomas Laybourn (Denmark) Kamilla Rytter Juhl	14	8
2	(China) Zheng Bo (China) Gao Ling	21	21
