= 2008 Denmark Super Series =

Tournament details
- Dates: October 21, 2008 - October 26, 2008
- Total prize money: US$200,000
- Venue: Arena Fyn
- Location: Odense, Denmark

The 2008 Denmark Super Series is the ninth tournament of the 2008 BWF Super Series in badminton. It was held in Odense, Denmark from October 21 to October 26, 2008.

== Final results ==
Category	Winners	Runners-up	Score
Men's singles	(Denmark) Peter Gade	(Denmark) Joachim Persson	21–18, 17–21, 21–14
Women's singles	(China) Wang Lin	(Hong Kong) Zhou Mi	21–18, 21–10
Men's doubles	(Indonesia) Markis Kido & Hendra Setiawan	(China) Fu Haifeng & Shen Ye	21–18, 21–19
Women's doubles	(Malaysia) Chin Eei Hui & Wong Pei Tty	(Indonesia) Rani Mundiasti & Jo Novita	23–21, 21–12
Mixed doubles	(Denmark) Joachim Fischer Nielsen & Christinna Pedersen	(Denmark) Thomas Laybourn & Kamilla Rytter Juhl	21–14, 21–17
