= 2008 China Masters Super Series =

Tournament details
- Dates: September 23, 2008 - September 28, 2008
- Total prize money: US$250,000
- Venue: Changzhou Olympic Sports Center
- Location: Changzhou, China

The 2008 China Masters Super Series is the eleventh tournament of the 2008 BWF Super Series in badminton. It was held in Changzhou, China from September 23 to September 28, 2008.

== Final results ==
| Category | Winners | Runners-up | Score |
|---|---|---|---|
| Men's singles | (Indonesia) Sony Dwi Kuncoro | (China) Chen Jin | 21–19, 21–18 |
| Women's singles | (Hong Kong) Zhou Mi | (China) Wang Lin | 21–19, 19–21, 21–16 |
| Men's doubles | (Indonesia) Markis Kido & Hendra Setiawan | (China) Sun Junjie & Xu Chen | 21–17, 24–22 |
| Women's doubles | (China) Cheng Shu & Zhao Yunlei | (Macau) Zhang Dan & Zhang Zhibo | 21–14, 21–11 |
| Mixed doubles | (China) Xie Zhongbo & Zhang Yawen | (Indonesia) Nova Widianto & Lilyana Natsir | 21–17, 21–17 |
