= 2008 Japan Super Series =

Tournament details
- Dates: September 16, 2008 - September 21, 2008
- Total prize money: US$200,000
- Venue: Tokyo Metropolitan Gymnasium
- Location: Tokyo, Japan

The 2008 Japan Super Series is the seventh tournament of the 2008 BWF Super Series in badminton. It was held in Tokyo, Japan, from September 16 to September 21, 2008.

== Final results ==
Category	Winners	Runners-up	Score
Men's singles	(Indonesia) Sony Dwi Kuncoro	(Malaysia) Lee Chong Wei	21–17, 21–11
Women's singles	(China) Wang Yihan	(Hong Kong) Zhou Mi	21–19, 17–21, 21–15
Men's doubles	(Denmark) Lars Paaske & Jonas Rasmussen	(Indonesia) Mohammad Ahsan & Bona Septano	21–17, 15–21, 21–13
Women's doubles	(China) Cheng Shu & Zhao Yunlei	(Malaysia) Chin Eei Hui & Wong Pei Tty	21–19, 15–21, 21–18
Mixed doubles	(Indonesia) Muhammad Rijal & Vita Marissa	(Indonesia) Nova Widianto & Lilyana Natsir	14–21, 21–15, 21–19
