= 2008 French Super Series =

Tournament details
- Dates: October 28, 2008 - November 2, 2008
- Total prize money: US$200,000
- Venue: Stade Pierre de Coubertin
- Location: Paris, France

The 2008 French Super Series is the tenth tournament of the 2008 BWF Super Series in badminton. It was held in Paris, France from October 28 to November 2, 2008.

== Final results ==
Category	Winners	Runners-up	Score
Men's singles	(Denmark) Peter Gade	(Indonesia) Taufik Hidayat	16–21, 21–17, 21–7
Women's singles	(China) Wang Lin	(China) Xie Xingfang	21–18, 13–21, 21–11
Men's doubles	(Indonesia) Markis Kido & Hendra Setiawan	(China) Cai Yun & Xu Chen	21–15, 21–12
Women's doubles	(China) Du Jing & Yu Yang	(Malaysia) Chin Eei Hui & Wong Pei Tty	20–22, 21–19, 21–11
Mixed doubles	(China) He Hanbin & Yu Yang	(England) Anthony Clark & Donna Kellogg	21–13, 21–19
