= Mohd Zakry Abdul Latif =

Malaysian badminton player (born 1983)

Zakry Latif
Personal information
- Born: Mohd Zakry bin Abdul Latif; 2 April 1983 (age 43) Negeri Sembilan, Malaysia
- Years active: 2001–2016
- Height: 1.70 m (5 ft 7 in)

Sport
- Country: Malaysia
- Sport: Badminton
- Handedness: Right

Men's doubles
- Career title: 4
- Highest ranking: 4
- BWF profile
Medal record
Men's badminton
Representing Malaysia
World Championships
Bronze medal – third place	2009 Hyderabad	Men's doubles
Sudirman Cup
Bronze medal – third place	2009 Guangzhou	Mixed team
Thomas Cup
Bronze medal – third place	2008 Jakarta	Men's team
Bronze medal – third place	2010 Kuala Lumpur	Men's team
Asian Games
Bronze medal – third place	2002 Busan	Men's team
Asian Championships
Bronze medal – third place	2007 Johor Bahru	Men's doubles
Southeast Asian Games
Silver medal – second place	2009 Vientiane	Men's team
Bronze medal – third place	2009 Vientiane	Men's doubles

Mohd Zakry bin Abdul Latif (born 2 April 1983) is a former Malaysian badminton player.

== Career ==
=== 2007 ===
Mohd Zakry played at the 2007 BWF World Championships in men's doubles with Mohd Fairuzizuan Mohd Tazari. They were seeded #7 and were defeated in the second round by Guo Zhendong and Xie Zhongbo, of China, 21-14, 21-13.

At the 2007 China Open Super Series they beat the tournament number two seeded, Cai Yun and Fu Haifeng in three sets in the first round. However, in the same round of the next Super Series, the Hong Kong Super Series, Mohd Fairuzizuan and Mohd Zakry were forced to bid an early farewell by the same rivals.

=== 2010 ===
Mohd Zakry Abdul Latif-Hoon Thien How started with a 26-24 opening game win against All-England champions Paaske-Rasmussen, before going down 12-21, 19-21 in a 74-minute battle.

== Achievements ==
=== World Championships ===
Men's doubles
Year	Venue	Partner	Opponent	Score	Result
2009	Gachibowli Indoor Stadium, Hyderabad, India	(Malaysia) Mohd Fairuzizuan Mohd Tazari	(China) Fu Haifeng (China) Cai Yun	21–18, 22–24, 15–21	Bronze

=== Asian Championships ===
Men's doubles
Year	Venue	Partner	Opponent	Score	Result
2007	Bandaraya Stadium, Johor Bahru, Malaysia	(Malaysia) Mohd Fairuzizuan Mohd Tazari	(Malaysia) Choong Tan Fook (Malaysia) Lee Wan Wah	21–11, 13–21, 15–21	Bronze

=== Southeast Asian Games ===
Men's doubles
Year	Venue	Partner	Opponent	Score	Result
2009	National Sports Complex, Vientiane, Laos	(Malaysia) Mohd Fairuzizuan Mohd Tazari	(Indonesia) Markis Kido (Indonesia) Hendra Setiawan	25–27, 21–15, 16–21	Bronze

=== IBF World Grand Prix/BWF Super Series/BWF Grand Prix Gold ===
Men's doubles
Year	Tournament	Partner	Opponent	Score	Result
2007	Indonesia Open	(Malaysia) Mohd Fairuzizuan Tazari	(China) Fu Haifeng (China) Cai Yun	17–21, 20–22	(silver) Runner-up
2008	Singapore Open	(Malaysia) Mohd Fairuzizuan Tazari	(Malaysia) Gan Teik Chai (Malaysia) Lin Woon Fui	21–18, 21–17	(gold) Winner
2008	Indonesia Open	(Malaysia) Mohd Fairuzizuan Tazari	(United States) Tony Gunawan (Indonesia) Candra Wijaya	19–21, 21–18, 21–14	(gold) Winner
2008	Hong Kong Open	(Malaysia) Mohd Fairuzizuan Tazari	(South Korea) Jung Jae-sung (South Korea) Lee Yong-dae	23–25, 21–19, 20–22	(silver) Runner-up
2010	India Open	(Malaysia) Mohd Fairuzizuan Tazari	(India) Rupesh Kumar K. T. (India) Sanave Thomas	21–12, 22–20	(gold) Winner
2012	Thailand Open	(Malaysia) Mohd Fairuzizuan Tazari	(China) Liu Xiaolong (China) Qiu Zihan	18–21, 19–21	(silver) Runner-up
2012	Chinese Taipei Open	(Malaysia) Mohd Fairuzizuan Tazari	(Indonesia) Angga Pratama (Indonesia) Rian Agung Saputro	21–12, 21–14	(gold) Winner

BWF Super Series tournament
BWF Grand Prix Gold tournament
