= Mohd Fairuzizuan Mohd Tazari =

Malaysian badminton player

Fairuzizuan Tazari
Personal information
- Born: Mohd Fairuzizuan bin Mohd Tazari; 5 February 1983 (age 43) Perak, Malaysia
- Years active: 2001-2014
- Height: 1.72 m (5 ft 8 in)

Sport
- Country: Malaysia
- Sport: Badminton
- Handedness: Right

Men's doubles & Mixed doubles
- Career title: 4
- Highest ranking: 4
- BWF profile
Medal record
Men's badminton
Representing Malaysia
World Championships
Bronze medal – third place	2009 Hyderabad	Men's doubles
World Cup
Silver medal – second place	2006 Yiyang	Men's doubles
Sudirman Cup
Bronze medal – third place	2009 Guangzhou	Mixed team
Thomas Cup
Bronze medal – third place	2008 Jakarta	Men's team
Bronze medal – third place	2010 Kuala Lumpur	Men's team
Asian Games
Bronze medal – third place	2006 Doha	Mixed doubles
Bronze medal – third place	2006 Doha	Men's team
Asian Championships
Bronze medal – third place	2007 Johor Bahru	Men's doubles
Bronze medal – third place	2007 Johor Bahru	Mixed doubles
Southeast Asian Games
Silver medal – second place	2009 Vientiane	Men's team
Bronze medal – third place	2009 Vientiane	Men's doubles
Asian Junior Championships
Bronze medal – third place	2000 Kyoto	Boys' team

Mohd Fairuzizuan Mohd Tazari (born 5 February 1983) is a former male badminton player from Malaysia.

== Career ==
=== 2007 ===
Mohd Fairuzizuan played at the 2007 BWF World Championships in the men's doubles with Mohd Zakry Abdul Latif. They were seeded #7 and were defeated in the second round by Guo Zhendong and Xie Zhongbo, of China, 21–14, 21–13.

At the 2007 China Open Super Series the pair beat the tournament number two seeded Cai Yun and Fu Haifeng, in three sets in the first round. However, in the same round of the next Super Series, the Hong Kong Super Series, Mohd Fairuzizuan and Mohd Zakry were defeated by the same rivals.

=== 2008 ===
In the Thomas Cup semi-finals between Malaysia and China at Jakarta, due to exclusion of the original first doubles, Choong Tan Fook-Lee Wan Wah, due to injury reasons, the original second doubles, Koo Kien Keat-Tan Boon Heong, was lined up as the first doubles and the unseeded Mohd Fairuzizuan and Mohd Zakry were lined up as the second doubles. At that time, Malaysia scored a point through the first singles while China scored 2 points through the first doubles and second singles. Despite being greenhorns in the Thomas Cup, Fairuzizuan-Zakry led a fierce fight and scored the 2nd point for Malaysia, defeating the Chinese pair, balancing the points at 2-2. However, Malaysia was eventually defeated through the third singles.

In the Singapore Open in June, Fairuzizuan-Zakry faced compatriots Gan Teik Chai-Lin Woon Fui in the men's doubles finals. Fairuzizuan-Zakry defeated Gan-Lin by straight sets.

== Achievements ==
=== World Championships ===
Men's doubles
Year	Venue	Partner	Opponent	Score	Result
2009	Gachibowli Indoor Stadium, Hyderabad, India	(Malaysia) Mohd Zakry Abdul Latif	(China) Fu Haifeng (China) Cai Yun	21–18, 22–24, 15–21	Bronze

=== World Cup ===
Men's doubles
Year	Venue	Partner	Opponent	Score	Result
2006	Olympic Park, Yiyang, China	(Malaysia) Lin Woon Fui	(Indonesia) Markis Kido (Indonesia) Hendra Setiawan	18–21, 15–21	Silver

=== Asian Games ===
Mixed doubles
Year	Venue	Partner	Opponent	Score	Result
2006	Aspire Hall 3, Doha, Qatar	(Malaysia) Wong Pei Tty	(China) Zheng Bo (China) Gao Ling	11–21, 13–21	Bronze

=== Asian Championships ===
Men's doubles
Year	Venue	Partner	Opponent	Score	Result
2007	Bandaraya Stadium, Johor Bahru, Malaysia	(Malaysia) Mohd Zakry Abdul Latif	(Malaysia) Choong Tan Fook (Malaysia) Lee Wan Wah	21–11, 13–21, 15–21	Bronze

Mixed doubles
Year	Venue	Partner	Opponent	Score	Result
2007	Bandaraya Stadium, Johor Bahru, Malaysia	(Malaysia) Wong Pei Tty	(China) Xu Chen (China) Zhao Tingting	19–21, 21–23	Bronze

=== Southeast Asian Games ===
Men's doubles
Year	Venue	Partner	Opponent	Score	Result
2009	National Sports Complex, Vientiane, Laos	(Malaysia) Mohd Zakry Abdul Latif	(Indonesia) Markis Kido (Indonesia) Hendra Setiawan	25–27, 21–15, 16–21	Bronze

=== IBF World Grand Prix/BWF Super Series/BWF Grand Prix Gold ===
Men's doubles
Year	Tournament	Partner	Opponent	Score	Result
2006	Malaysia Open	(Malaysia) Lin Woon Fui	(Malaysia) Chan Chong Ming (Malaysia) Koo Kien Keat	21–14, 11–21, 17–21	(silver) Runner-up
2007	Indonesia Open	(Malaysia) Mohd Zakry Latif	(China) Fu Haifeng (China) Cai Yun	17–21, 20–22	(silver) Runner-up
2008	Singapore Open	(Malaysia) Mohd Zakry Latif	(Malaysia) Gan Teik Chai (Malaysia) Lin Woon Fui	21–18, 21–17	(gold) Winner
2008	Indonesia Open	(Malaysia) Mohd Zakry Latif	(United States) Tony Gunawan (Indonesia) Candra Wijaya	19–21, 21–18, 21–14	(gold) Winner
2008	Hong Kong Open	(Malaysia) Mohd Zakry Latif	(South Korea) Jung Jae-sung (South Korea) Lee Yong-dae	23–25, 21–19, 20–22	(silver) Runner-up
2010	Vietnam Open	(Malaysia) Ong Soon Hock	(Indonesia) Mohammad Ahsan (Indonesia) Bona Septano	18–21, 21–13, 17–21	(silver) Runner-up
2010	India Open	(Malaysia) Mohd Zakry Latif	(India) Rupesh Kumar K. T. (India) Sanave Thomas	21–12, 22–20	(gold) Winner
2012	Thailand Open	(Malaysia) Mohd Zakry Latif	(China) Liu Xiaolong (China) Qiu Zihan	18–21, 19–21	(silver) Runner-up
2012	Chinese Taipei Open	(Malaysia) Mohd Zakry Latif	(Indonesia) Angga Pratama (Indonesia) Rian Agung Saputro	21–12, 21–14	(gold) Winner

BWF Superseries tournament
Grand Prix Gold Tournament
Grand Prix Tournament
IBF World Grand Prix tournament
