= Zhou Mi (badminton) =

Chinese badminton player (born 1979)

Zhou Mi 周蜜
Personal information
- Born: 18 February 1979 (age 47) Nanning, Guangxi, China
- Height: 1.74 m (5 ft 9 in)

Sport
- Sport: Badminton
- Handedness: Right

Women's singles
- Highest ranking: 1
- BWF profile
Medal record
Women's badminton
Representing China
Olympic Games
Bronze medal – third place	2004 Athens	Women's singles
World Championships
Silver medal – second place	2001 Seville	Women's singles
Bronze medal – third place	2003 Birmingham	Women's singles
Sudirman Cup
Gold medal – first place	2001 Seville	Mixed team
Silver medal – second place	2003 Eindhoven	Mixed team
Uber Cup
Gold medal – first place	2002 Guangzhou	Women's team
Gold medal – first place	2004 Jakarta	Women's team
Asian Games
Gold medal – first place	2002 Busan	Women's singles
Gold medal – first place	2002 Busan	Women's team
Asia Championships
Gold medal – first place	2002 Bangkok	Women's singles
World Junior Championships
Bronze medal – third place	1996 Silkeborg	Mixed doubles
Asia Junior Championships
Gold medal – first place	1997 Manila	Girls' team
Silver medal – second place	1997 Manila	Girls' singles
Bronze medal – third place	1997 Manila	Girls' doubles
Representing Hong Kong
Asia Championships
Bronze medal – third place	2010 New Delhi	Women's singles
East Asian Games
Silver medal – second place	2009 Hong Kong	Women's singles
Bronze medal – third place	2009 Hong Kong	Women's team

Zhou Mi (Chinese: 周蜜; pinyin: Zhōu Mì; Jyutping: zau^{1} mat^{6}; born 18 February 1979) is a Chinese badminton player. During much of her career she represented the People's Republic of China, but since 2007 she has represented Hong Kong which has a sports program and teams independent from those of the mainland. In 2010, she received a 2-year ban, for failing a drugs test.

== Career ==
Since 1998 Zhou has won more than twenty international singles titles on the world circuit and has achieved number one world rankings at various times. She was a silver medalist behind compatriot Gong Ruina at the 2001 IBF World Championships and was a bronze medalist at the 2003 Championships. She won women's singles at the quadrennial Asian Games in 2002, defeating Gong Ruina in the final. Zhou is a three-time finalist at the prestigious All-England Championships where she captured the title in 2003. She played singles for world champion Chinese Uber Cup (women's international) teams in 2002 and 2004.

=== Olympic controversy ===
At the 2004 Athens Olympics Zhou reached the semifinal round where she was eliminated from gold medal contention by fellow countrywoman Zhang Ning. She then defeated Gong Ruina in the playoff for the bronze medal. The circumstances behind Zhou's semifinal defeat are controversial, however, because China's national coach Li Yongbo later confirmed rumors that he had instructed Zhou not to fight hard after she had dropped the first game to Zhang. His rationale was that a fresh Zhang Ning would have a better chance to defeat a non-Chinese opponent, the Netherlands' Mia Audina, in the final.

=== "Retirement" and comeback ===
Whether the Olympic episode or subsequent injury and poor performance was the primary cause, Zhou apparently retired from badminton during the 2005 season. She played no tournaments in 2006 but secured residence in Hong Kong through its Quality Migration program. Zhou then reemerged on the world badminton circuit during the 2007 season. From a weak start at the Singapore Open her results dramatically improved to the point where she had regained a number one world ranking as of the end of the year 2008. Since launching her comeback Zhou's titles have included the New Zealand and Philippines Opens in 2007, and the South Korea, India, Macau Opens, and China Masters in 2008. In December, Zhou ended the 2008 season by winning the BWF Super Series Masters Finals, the biggest prize money event in the sport.

=== Positive clenbuterol test and two years ban ===
The BWF announced on 4 September 2010 that a BWF Doping Hearing conducted in Copenhagen on Monday 23 August has banned Zhou Mi for 2 years from participation in badminton, following an Adverse Analytical Finding. A sample taken from her in late June as part of the BWF's 'out-of-competition' testing programme. Zhou tested positive to clenbuterol, a Class 1 Anabolic Agent on the WADA Prohibited List of substances.

On 27 October 2011, more than one year after she was handed a two-year ban for testing positive for clenbuterol, former badminton world No. 1 Zhou Mi reiterated her innocence. "At the time of the test, I was not competing or preparing to compete. There was not even the slightest reason or incentive for me to take any performance-enhancing substance," said Zhou. Regardless of the incident, Zhou, now 32, added it was time for her to retire from the sport. Clenbuterol can be consumed from eating contaminated food.

== Achievements ==
=== Olympic Games ===
Women's singles
Year	Venue	Opponent	Score	Result
2004	Goudi Olympic Hall; Athens, Greece	(China) Gong Ruina	11–2, 8–11, 11–6	Bronze

=== World Championships ===
Women's singles
Year	Venue	Opponent	Score	Result
2001	Palacio de Deportes de San Pablo; Seville, Spain	(China) Gong Ruina	9–11, 4–11	Silver
2003	National Indoor Arena; Birmingham, England	(China) Gong Ruina	2–11, 4–11	Bronze

=== Asian Games ===
Women's singles
Year	Venue	Opponent	Score	Result
2002	Gangseo Gymnasium; Busan, South Korea	(China) Gong Ruina	11–1, 11–1	Gold

=== Asian Championships ===
Women's singles
Year	Venue	Opponent	Score	Result
2002	Nimibutr Stadium; Bangkok, Thailand	(China) Zhang Ning	6–11, 11–3, 11–8	Gold
2010	Siri Fort Indoor Stadium; New Delhi, India	(China) Liu Xin	15–21, 18–21	Bronze

=== East Asian Games ===
Women's singles
Year	Venue	Opponent	Score	Result
2009	Queen Elizabeth Stadium, Hong Kong	(Hong Kong) Yip Pui Yin	21–15, 13–21, 10–17 retired	Silver

=== World Junior Championships ===
Mixed doubles
Year	Venue	Partner	Opponent	Score	Result
1996	Silkeborg Hallerne; Silkeborg, Denmark	(China) Zhu Feng	(China) Cheng Rui (China) Gao Ling	8–15, 14–17	Bronze

=== Asian Junior Championships ===
Girls' singles
Year	Venue	Opponent	Score	Result
1997	Ninoy Aquino Stadium; Manila, Philippines	(China) Gong Ruina	5–11, 5–11	Silver

Girls' doubles
Year	Venue	Partner	Opponent	Score	Result
1997	Ninoy Aquino Stadium; Manila, Philippines	(China) Yu Hua	(Malaysia) Chor Hooi Yee (Malaysia) Lim Pek Siah	10–15, 6–15	Bronze

=== BWF Superseries ===
The BWF Superseries, which was launched on 14 December 2006 and implemented in 2007, is a series of elite badminton tournaments, sanctioned by the Badminton World Federation (BWF). BWF Superseries levels are Superseries and Superseries Premier. A season of Superseries consists of twelve tournaments around the world that have been introduced since 2011. Successful players are invited to the Superseries Finals, which are held at the end of each year.

Women's singles
Year	Tournament	Opponent	Score	Result
2008	Korea Open	(China) Lu Lan	21–18, 15–21, 21–15	(gold) Winner
2008	Singapore Open	(Denmark) Tine Rasmussen	19–21, 17–21	(silver) Runner-up
2008	Japan Open	(China) Wang Yihan	19–21, 21–17, 15–21	(silver) Runner-up
2008	China Masters	(China) Wang Lin	21–19, 19–21, 21–16	(gold) Winner
2008	Denmark Open	(China) Wang Lin	18–21, 10–21	(silver) Runner-up
2008	World Superseries Masters Finals	(Hong Kong) Wang Chen	21–14, 21–18	(gold) Winner
2009	Malaysia Open	(Denmark) Tine Rasmussen	17–21, 21–15, 16–21	(silver) Runner-up
2009	Singapore Open	(China) Xie Xingfang	21–19, 18–21, 21–10	(gold) Winner

BWF Super Series Finals tournament
BWF Super Series tournament

=== BWF Grand Prix ===
The BWF Grand Prix had two levels, the BWF Grand Prix and Grand Prix Gold. It was a series of badminton tournaments sanctioned by the Badminton World Federation (BWF) which was held from 2007 to 2017. The World Badminton Grand Prix sanctioned by International Badminton Federation (IBF) from 1983 to 2006.

Women's singles
Year	Tournament	Opponent	Score	Result
1998	Brunei Open	(China) Gong Ruina	7–11, 4–11	(silver) Runner-up
1998	Dutch Open	(China) Yao Jie	10–13, 13–11, 11–4	(gold) Winner
1999	Korea Open	(China) Gong Ruina	11–6, 13–12	(gold) Winner
1999	Chinese Taipei Open	(China) Dai Yun	5–11, 8–11	(silver) Runner-up
1999	Denmark Open	(Denmark) Camilla Martin	11–8, 3–11, 1–11	(silver) Runner-up
1999	China Open	(China) Gong Ruina	11–6, 11–5	(gold) Winner
2000	Thailand Open	(China) Ye Zhaoying	5–11, 0–11	(silver) Runner-up
2000	Dutch Open	(China) Gong Ruina	11–7, 9–11, 11–8	(gold) Winner
2000	Denmark Open	(Denmark) Camilla Martin	1–11, 11–6, 11–7	(gold) Winner
2000	World Grand Prix Finals	(China) Gong Zhichao	7–5, 5–7, 7–1, 7–0	(gold) Winner
2001	All England Open	(China) Gong Zhichao	7–11, 3–11	(silver) Runner-up
2001	Japan Open	(China) Gong Ruina	11–8, 11–0	(gold) Winner
2001	Malaysia Open	(China) Gong Ruina	3–7, 2–7, 4–7	(silver) Runner-up
2001	China Open	(China) Gong Ruina	7–2, 7–0, 7–4	(gold) Winner
2002	Japan Open	(China) Dai Yun	7–1, 7–0, 7–1	(gold) Winner
2002	Singapore Open	(China) Zhang Ning	11–6, 11–3	(gold) Winner
2003	All England Open	(China) Xie Xingfang	11–6, 11–5	(gold) Winner
2003	Singapore Open	(China) Zhang Ning	0–11, 8–11	(silver) Runner-up
2003	Malaysia Open	(Denmark) Camilla Martin	11–1, 7–11, 11–5	(gold) Winner
2003	Denmark Open	(China) Gong Ruina	11–4, 10–13, 3–11	(silver) Runner-up
2003	China Open	(China) Gong Ruina	13–10, 11–1	(gold) Winner
2004	All England Open	(China) Gong Ruina	7–11, 7–11	(silver) Runner-up
2004	Malaysia Open	(China) Zhang Ning	11–9, 7–11, 8–11	(silver) Runner-up
2004	Singapore Open	(China) Zhang Ning	8–11, 1–11	(silver) Runner-up
2005	Singapore Open	(China) Zhang Ning	5–11, 7–11	(silver) Runner-up
2005	China Masters	(China) Zhang Ning	3–11, 11–5, 3–11	(silver) Runner-up
2007	New Zealand Open	(Japan) Chie Umezu	21–13, 21–10	(gold) Winner
2007	Thailand Open	(China) Zhu Lin	22–20, 5–21, 14–21	(silver) Runner-up
2007	Philippines Open	(China) Zhu Jingjing	21–18, 21–12	(gold) Winner
2008	India Open	(China) Lu Lan	21–14, 21–14	(gold) Winner
2008	Macau Open	(Malaysia) Julia Wong Pei Xian	21–13, 21–19	(gold) Winner
2008	New Zealand Open	(New Zealand) Rachel Hindley	21–10, 21–15	(gold) Winner
2009	Philippines Open	(China) Wang Xin	10–21, 21–12, 21–23	(silver) Runner-up
2010	Malaysia Grand Prix Gold	(Hong Kong) Yip Pui Yin	16–21, 21–14, 19–21	(silver) Runner-up

Women's doubles
Year	Tournament	Partner	Opponent	Score	Result
1999	Dutch Open	(China) Tang Chunyu	(China) Chen Lin (China) Jiang Xuelian	9–15, 4–15	(silver) Runner-up

Mixed doubles
Year	Tournament	Partner	Opponent	Score	Result
1996	Brunei Open	(China) Yang Ming	(Indonesia) Sandiarto (Indonesia) Vera Octavia	13–18, 12–15	(silver) Runner-up

BWF Grand Prix Gold tournament
BWF Grand Prix tournament

=== BWF International Challenge/Series ===
Women's singles
Year	Tournament	Opponent	Score	Result
1999	French International	(India) Aparna Popat	11–0, 11–2	(gold) Winner
2007	Miami Pan Am International	(Spain) Lucía Tavera	21–7, 21–6	(gold) Winner

BWF International Challenge tournament
BWF International Series tournament
BWF Future Series tournament

== Record against selected opponents ==
Record against year-end Finals finalists, World Championships semi-finalists, and Olympic quarter-finalists.

Players	Matches	Results		Difference
Players	Matches	Won	Lost	Difference
(Bulgaria) Petya Nedelcheva	4	4	0	+4
(China) Dai Yun	6	3	3	0
(China) Gong Ruina	24	12	12	0
(China) Gong Zhichao	3	2	1	+1
(China) Han Jingna	1	1	0	+1
(China) Li Xuerui	1	0	1	–1
(China) Lu Lan	7	6	1	+5
(China) Wang Lin	4	3	1	+2
(China) Wang Shixian	1	0	1	–1
(China) Wang Xin	2	0	2	–2
(China) Wang Yihan	4	0	4	–4
(China) Xie Xingfang	12	9	3	+6
(China) Ye Zhaoying	2	0	2	–2

Players	Matches	Results		Difference
Players	Matches	Won	Lost	Difference
(China) Zhang Ning	20	12	8	+4
(China) Zhu Lin	6	1	5	–4
(Chinese Taipei) Huang Chia-chi	1	1	0	+1
(Chinese Taipei) Tai Tzu-ying	1	1	0	+1
(Denmark) Tine Baun	12	8	4	+4
(Denmark) Camilla Martin	8	4	4	0
(Denmark) Mette Sørensen	1	1	0	+1
(England) Tracey Hallam	4	4	0	+4
(France) Pi Hongyan	7	4	3	+1
(Germany) Juliane Schenk	4	3	1	+2
(Germany) Xu Huaiwen	7	4	3	+1
(Hong Kong) / (China) Wang Chen	11	7	4	+3
(Hong Kong) Yip Pui Yin	3	2	1	+1

Players	Matches	Results		Difference
Players	Matches	Won	Lost	Difference
(India) Saina Nehwal	4	3	1	+2
(Indonesia) Lindaweni Fanetri	1	1	0	+1
(Indonesia) Maria Kristin Yulianti	3	2	1	+1
(Japan) Yasuko Mizui	2	1	1	0
(Malaysia) Wong Mew Choo	3	3	0	+3
(Netherlands) / (Indonesia) Mia Audina	11	6	5	+1
(South Korea) Bae Yeon-ju	2	0	2	–2
(South Korea) Kim Ji-hyun	2	1	1	0
(South Korea) Sung Ji-hyun	2	1	1	0
(Thailand) Porntip Buranaprasertsuk	2	2	0	+2
(Thailand) Ratchanok Intanon	1	1	0	+1
(Thailand) Somharuthai Jaroensiri	1	0	1	–1
