= Donna Kellogg =

English badminton player (born 1978)

Personal information
- Born: Donna Victoria Kellogg; 20 January 1978 (age 48) Spondon, Derby, England
- Height: 1.78 m (5 ft 10 in)

Sport
- Country: England
- Sport: Badminton
- Handedness: Right
- Coached by: Andy Wood; Julian Robertson

Women's & mixed doubles
- Highest ranking: 4 (WD with Gail Emms 16 March 2006); 4 (XD with Anthony Clark 4 December 2008)
- BWF profile
Medal record
Women's badminton
Representing England
World Championships
Silver medal – second place	2006 Madrid	Mixed doubles
Sudirman Cup
Bronze medal – third place	2007 Glasgow	Mixed team
Commonwealth Games
Gold medal – first place	1998 Kuala Lumpur	Women's doubles
Gold medal – first place	1998 Kuala Lumpur	Women's team
Gold medal – first place	2002 Manchester	Mixed team
Bronze medal – third place	1998 Kuala Lumpur	Mixed doubles
Silver medal – second place	2006 Melbourne	Mixed team
Bronze medal – third place	2006 Melbourne	Women's doubles
European Championships
Gold medal – first place	2000 Glasgow	Women's doubles
Gold medal – first place	2006 Den Bosch	Women's doubles
Gold medal – first place	2008 Herning	Mixed doubles
Silver medal – second place	2008 Herning	Women's doubles
Bronze medal – third place	1998 Sofia	Women's doubles
Bronze medal – third place	2006 Den Bosch	Mixed doubles
European Mixed Team Championships
Silver medal – second place	1998 Sofia	Mixed team
Silver medal – second place	2000 Glasgow	Mixed team
Silver medal – second place	2008 Herning	Mixed team
Silver medal – second place	2009 Liverpool	Mixed team
Bronze medal – third place	2006 Den Bosch	Mixed team
European Women's Team Championships
Silver medal – second place	2006 Thessaloniki	Women's team
European Junior Championships
Gold medal – first place	1995 Nitra	Girls' doubles
Bronze medal – third place	1995 Nitra	Mixed team
Bronze medal – third place	1997 Nymburk	Girls' singles
Bronze medal – third place	1997 Nymburk	Mixed doubles

Donna Victoria Kellogg, MBE (born 20 January 1978) is an English former badminton player. She is the European Champion, winning the women's doubles titles in 2000, 2006 and the mixed doubles title in 2008. She won the silver medal at the 2006 World Championships. Kellogg also won the women's doubles title at the 1998 Commonwealth Games, and was part of the England winning team at the 1998 and 2002 Commonwealth Games.

== Career ==
Kellogg first played badminton at the age of 10. Her first representative match for England was against China at the 1997 World Championships in Scotland. The best performances of her career are winning the European women's doubles gold medal in 2000 with Joanne Goode and in 2006 with Gail Emms.

Kellogg's highest world ranking is fourth in women's doubles, with a national ranking of first in the same event.

=== 1998 Commonwealth Games ===
She represented England and won two gold medals (women's doubles and team) and a bronze medal (mixed doubles), at the 1998 Commonwealth Games in Kuala Lumpur, Malaysia.

=== 2004 Summer Olympics ===
Kellogg competed with Gail Emms in women's doubles at the 2004 Summer Olympics. They defeated Koon Wai Chee and Li Wing Mui of Hong Kong in the first round, but were defeated by Wei Yili and Zhao Tingting of China in the round of 16.

=== 2006 World Championships and Commonwealth Games ===
Kellogg reached the mixed doubles final at the 2006 World Championships with Anthony Clark, losing in the final against Nathan Robertson and Gail Emms. She also won a silver medal (team) and bronze medal (doubles) at the 2006 Commonwealth Games.

=== 2008 Summer Olympics ===
She and partner Gail Emms faced China in doubles at the 2008 Olympics in the round of 16. They lost the first match.

== Personal life ==
Kellogg was appointed Member of the Order of the British Empire (MBE) in the 2010 Birthday Honours.

== Achievements ==
=== World Championships ===
Mixed doubles
Year	Venue	Partner	Opponent	Score	Result
2006	Palacio de Deportes de la Comunidad, Madrid, Spain	(England) Anthony Clark	(England) Nathan Robertson (England) Gail Emms	15–21, 12–21	Silver

=== Commonwealth Games ===
Women's doubles
Year	Venue	Partner	Opponent	Score	Result
1998	Kuala Lumpur Badminton Stadium, Kuala Lumpur, Malaysia	(England) Joanne Goode	(Malaysia) Chor Hooi Yee (Malaysia) Lim Pek Siah	15–8, 15–6	Gold
2006	Melbourne Convention and Exhibition Centre, Melbourne, Australia	(England) Gail Emms	(India) Trupti Murgunde (India) Saina Nehwal	21–14, 21–9	Bronze

Mixed doubles
Year	Venue	Partner	Opponent	Score	Result
1998	Kuala Lumpur Badminton Stadium, Kuala Lumpur, Malaysia	(England) Chris Hunt	(England) Nathan Robertson (England) Joanne Davies	15–7, 15–17, 14–17	Bronze

=== European Championships ===
Women's doubles
Year	Venue	Partner	Opponent	Score	Result
1998	Winter Sports Palace, Sofia, Bulgaria	(England) Joanne Goode	(Denmark) Rikke Olsen (Denmark) Marlene Thomsen	5–15, 10–15	Bronze
2000	Kelvin Hall International Sports Arena, Glasgow, Scotland	(England) Joanne Goode	(Denmark) Helene Kirkegaard (Denmark) Rikke Olsen	7–15, 15–10, 15–8	Gold
2006	Maaspoort Sports and Events, Den Bosch, Netherlands	(England) Gail Emms	(Germany) Nicole Grether (Germany) Juliane Schenk	21–12, 21–10	Gold
2008	Messecenter, Herning, Denmark	(England) Gail Emms	(Denmark) Lena Frier Kristiansen (Denmark) Kamilla Rytter Juhl	18–21, 18–21	Silver

Mixed doubles
Year	Venue	Partner	Opponent	Score	Result
2006	Maaspoort, Den Bosch, Netherlands	(England) Anthony Clark	(Denmark) Jens Eriksen (Denmark) Mette Schjoldager	16–21, 14–21	Bronze
2008	Messecenter, Herning, Denmark	(England) Anthony Clark	(Poland) Robert Mateusiak (Poland) Nadieżda Kostiuczyk	16–21, 22–20, 21–15	Gold

=== European Junior Championships ===
Girls' singles
Year	Venue	Opponent	Score	Result
1997	Nymburk, Czech Republic	(Denmark) Tine Rasmussen	11–3, 5–11, 9–12	Bronze

Girls' doubles
Year	Venue	Partner	Opponent	Score	Result
1995	Športová hala Olympia, Nitra, Slovakia	(England) Joanne Wright	(Russia) Natalia Djachkova (Russia) Ella Karachkova	15–7, 18–13	Gold

Mixed doubles
Year	Venue	Partner	Opponent	Score	Result
1997	Nymburk, Czech Republic	(England) David Lindley	(Denmark) Kristian Langbak (Denmark) Jane F. Bramsen	9–15, 9–15	Bronze

=== BWF Superseries ===
The BWF Superseries, which was launched on 14 December 2006 and implemented in 2007, is a series of elite badminton tournaments, sanctioned by the Badminton World Federation (BWF). Successful players are invited to the Superseries Finals, which are held at the end of each year.

Mixed doubles
Year	Tournament	Partner	Opponent	Score	Result
2007	All England Open	(England) Anthony Clark	(China) Zheng Bo (China) Gao Ling	21–16, 18–21, 14–21	(silver) Runner-up
2007	China Masters	(England) Anthony Clark	(China) Zheng Bo (China) Gao Ling	16–21, 17–21	(silver) Runner-up
2008	Swiss Open	(England) Anthony Clark	(China) He Hanbin (China) Yu Yang	15–21, 9–21	(silver) Runner-up
2008	Singapore Open	(England) Anthony Clark	(Indonesia) Nova Widianto (Indonesia) Liliyana Natsir	21–17, 14–21, 9–21	(silver) Runner-up
2008	French Open	(England) Anthony Clark	(China) He Hanbin (China) Yu Yang	13–21, 19–21	(silver) Runner-up
2009	Denmark Open	(England) Anthony Clark	(Denmark) Joachim Fischer Nielsen (Denmark) Christinna Pedersen	16–21, 27–25, 17–21	(silver) Runner-up

BWF Super Series Finals tournament
BWF Super Series tournament

=== IBF World Grand Prix ===
The World Badminton Grand Prix has been sanctioned by the International Badminton Federation from 1983 to 2006.

Women's doubles
Year	Tournament	Partner	Opponent	Score	Result
1997	Swedish Open	(England) Julie Bradbury	(China) Liu Lu (China) Qian Hong	11–15, 18–17, 11–15	(silver) Runner-up
2000	Indonesia Open	(England) Joanne Goode	(Netherlands) Lotte Jonathans (Netherlands) Nicole van Hooren	7–15, 15–12, 15–10	(gold) Winner
2005	Korea Open	(England) Gail Emms	(South Korea) Lee Hyo-jung (South Korea) Lee Kyung-won	Walkover	(silver) Runner-up
2005	Thessaloniki Grand Prix	(England) Gail Emms	(Malaysia) Chor Hooi Yee (Malaysia) Lim Pek Siah	17–14, 15–8	(gold) Winner
2005	Denmark Open	(England) Gail Emms	(Japan) Kumiko Ogura (Japan) Reiko Shiota	6–15, 9–15	(silver) Runner-up
2006	Denmark Open	(England) Gail Emms	(Poland) Kamila Augustyn (Poland) Nadieżda Kostiuczyk	20–22, 10–21	(silver) Runner-up

Mixed doubles
Year	Tournament	Partner	Opponent	Score	Result
2005	Thessaloniki Grand Prix	(England) Anthony Clark	(England) Robert Blair (England) Natalie Munt	15–4, 6–15, 15–13	(gold) Winner
2006	Denmark Open	(England) Anthony Clark	(Denmark) Thomas Laybourn (Denmark) Kamilla Rytter Juhl	14–21, 21–14, 22–20	(gold) Winner

=== IBF International ===
Mixed doubles
Year	Tournament	Partner	Opponent	Score	Result
2003	Austrian International	(England) Simon Archer	(Sweden) Fredrik Bergström (Sweden) Johanna Persson	11–6, 5–11, 11–6	(gold) Winner
2003	Slovenian International	(England) Simon Archer	(Russia) Nikolai Zuyev (Russia) Marina Yakusheva	15–2, 17–16	(gold) Winner
2003	Iceland International	(England) Simon Archer	(Denmark) Jesper Larsen (Denmark) Mie Nielsen	15–13, 15–4	(gold) Winner
2003	Scottish International	(England) Simon Archer	(Sweden) Imanuel Hirschfeldt (Sweden) Frida Andreasson	15–5, 15–3	(gold) Winner
2003	Irish International	(England) Simon Archer	(Denmark) Rasmus Andersen (Denmark) Kamilla Rytter Juhl	15–12, 15–4	(gold) Winner
2004	Portugal International	(England) Simon Archer	(Germany) Kristof Hopp (Germany) Kathrin Piotrowski	15–12, 15–12	(gold) Winner
2005	Portugal International	(England) Anthony Clark	(Spain) Sergio Llopis (Spain) Dolores Marco	15–5, 15–10	(gold) Winner

== Record against selected opponents ==
Mixed doubles results with Anthony Clark against Superseries finalists, World Championships semifinalists, and Olympic quarterfinalists.

- (China) Zhang Jun & Gao Ling 2–2
- (China) Zheng Bo & Gao Ling 1–4
- (China) He Hanbin & Yu Yang 1–5
- (China) Xie Zhongbo & Zhang Yawen 3–3
- (Denmark) Jens Eriksen & Mette Schjoldager 0–2
- (Denmark) Joachim Fischer Nielsen & Christinna Pedersen 2–2
- (Denmark) Thomas Laybourn & Kamilla Rytter Juhl 1–1
- (England) Nathan Robertson & Gail Emms 1–3
- (Indonesia) Flandy Limpele & Vita Marissa 1–0
- (Indonesia) Nova Widianto & Liliyana Natsir 3–7
- (South Korea) Ko Sung-hyun & Ha Jung-eun 0–1
- (Malaysia) Koo Kien Keat & Wong Pei Tty 5–2
- (Poland) Robert Mateusiak & Nadieżda Zięba 3–1
- (Thailand) Songphon Anugritayawon & Kunchala Voravichitchaikul 2–1
- (Thailand) Sudket Prapakamol & Saralee Thungthongkam 1–2
