= Badminton at the 2007 SEA Games =

- Venue: Wongchawalitkul University
- Date: 8–14 December 2007
- Nations: 8

The badminton tournament at the 2007 SEA Games was held from 8 December to 14 December in the Nakhon Ratchasima Province of Thailand.

== Participating nations ==
- Cambodia (4)
- Indonesia (22)
- Laos (12)
- Malaysia (18)
- Philippines (4)
- Singapore (21)
- Thailand (18)
- Vietnam (9)

There was no participation from Brunei, Myanmar, and Timor Leste.

== Medal tally ==
* Host nation (Thailand)

Rank	Nation	Gold	Silver	Bronze	Total
1	Indonesia (INA)	7	2	2	11
2	Singapore (SIN)	0	4	2	6
3	Thailand (THA)*	0	1	5	6
4	Malaysia (MAS)	0	0	4	4
5	Vietnam (VIE)	0	0	1	1
Totals (5 entries)		7	7	14	28

== Medalists ==
Event	Gold	Silver	Bronze
Men's singles	Taufik Hidayat; Indonesia	Kendrick Lee; Singapore	Nguyễn Tiến Minh; Vietnam
Men's singles	Taufik Hidayat; Indonesia	Kendrick Lee; Singapore	Boonsak Ponsana; Thailand
Women's singles	Maria Kristin Yulianti; Indonesia	Adriyanti Firdasari; Indonesia	Julia Wong Pei Xian; Malaysia
Women's singles	Maria Kristin Yulianti; Indonesia	Adriyanti Firdasari; Indonesia	Soratja Chansrisukot; Thailand
Men's doubles	Indonesia; Markis Kido; Hendra Setiawan	Singapore; Hendra Wijaya; Hendri Saputra	Malaysia; Gan Teik Chai; Lin Woon Fui
Men's doubles	Indonesia; Markis Kido; Hendra Setiawan	Singapore; Hendra Wijaya; Hendri Saputra	Indonesia; Hendra Aprida Gunawan; Joko Riyadi
Women's doubles	Indonesia; Vita Marissa; Liliyana Natsir	Indonesia; Jo Novita; Greysia Polii	Singapore; Jiang Yanmei; Li Yujia
Women's doubles	Indonesia; Vita Marissa; Liliyana Natsir	Indonesia; Jo Novita; Greysia Polii	Thailand; Duanganong Aroonkesorn; Kunchala Voravichitchaikul
Mixed doubles	Indonesia; Flandy Limpele; Vita Marissa	Thailand; Sudket Prapakamol; Saralee Thungthongkam	Singapore; Hendri Saputra; Li Yujia
Mixed doubles	Indonesia; Flandy Limpele; Vita Marissa	Thailand; Sudket Prapakamol; Saralee Thungthongkam	Indonesia; Nova Widianto; Liliyana Natsir
Men's teams	Indonesia; Sony Dwi Kuncoro; Simon Santoso; Taufik Hidayat; Joko Riyadi; Hendra Setiawan; Nova Widianto; Hendra Aprida Gunawan; Markis Kido; Alvent Yulianto; Flandy Limpele	Singapore; Ashton Chen Yong Zhao; Chew Swee Hau; Khoo Kian Teck; Kendrick Lee; Muhammad Azlin Latib; Hendri Saputra; Ronald Susilo; Hendra Wijaya; Derek Wong	Thailand; Songphon Anugritayawon; Nuttaphon Narkthong; Patapol Ngernsrisuk; Tesana Panvisvas; Boonsak Ponsana; Sudket Prapakamol; Nitipong Saengsila; Tanongsak Saensomboonsuk; Poompat Sapkulchananart; Pakkawat Vilailak
Men's teams	Indonesia; Sony Dwi Kuncoro; Simon Santoso; Taufik Hidayat; Joko Riyadi; Hendra Setiawan; Nova Widianto; Hendra Aprida Gunawan; Markis Kido; Alvent Yulianto; Flandy Limpele	Singapore; Ashton Chen Yong Zhao; Chew Swee Hau; Khoo Kian Teck; Kendrick Lee; Muhammad Azlin Latib; Hendri Saputra; Ronald Susilo; Hendra Wijaya; Derek Wong	Malaysia; Razif Abdul Latif; Chan Kwong Beng; Gan Teik Chai; Khoo Chung Chiat; Kuan Beng Hong; Lin Woon Fui; Tan Chun Seang; Tan Wee Kiong; Yeoh Kay Bin
Women's team	Indonesia; Pia Zebadiah Bernadet; Adriyanti Firdasari; Maria Kristin Yulianti; Endang Nursugianti; Liliyana Natsir; Lita Nurlita; Vita Marissa; Rani Mundiati; Jo Novita; Greysia Polii	Singapore; Li Li; Xing Aiying; Jiang Yanmei; Li Yujia; Frances Liu; Yao Lei; Vanessa Neo; Shinta Mulia Sari; Fu Mingtian; Gu Juan	Thailand; Duanganong Aroonkesorn; Porntip Buranaprasertsuk; Soratja Chansrisukot; Sirivannavari Nariratana; Molthila Meemeak; Salakjit Ponsana; Saralee Thungthongkam; Kunchala Voravichitchaikul
Women's team	Indonesia; Pia Zebadiah Bernadet; Adriyanti Firdasari; Maria Kristin Yulianti; Endang Nursugianti; Liliyana Natsir; Lita Nurlita; Vita Marissa; Rani Mundiati; Jo Novita; Greysia Polii	Singapore; Li Li; Xing Aiying; Jiang Yanmei; Li Yujia; Frances Liu; Yao Lei; Vanessa Neo; Shinta Mulia Sari; Fu Mingtian; Gu Juan	Malaysia; Lydia Cheah Li Ya; Goh Liu Ying; Ng Hui Lin; Anita Raj Kaur; Wong Pei Tty; Julia Wong Pei Xian; Woon Khe Wei; Amelia Alicia Anscelly; Chin Eei Hui

== Men's Badminton ==
=== Team ===
Quarter-finals
Indonesia
Bye
Thailand	3
Laos	0
Cambodia	0
Malaysia	3
Vietnam	2
Singapore	3

Semi-finals
Indonesia	3
Thailand	1
Malaysia	1
Singapore	3

Final
Indonesia	3
Singapore	0

=== Singles ===
1st Round
(Indonesia) Taufik Hidayat	21	21
(Thailand) Panasy Soukanta	8	7
(Malaysia) Yeoh Kay Bin	21	21
(Cambodia) Veasna Troeung	6	9
(Singapore) Derek Wong	9	19
(Thailand) Poompat Sapkulchananart	21	21
(Vietnam) Nguyễn Tiến Minh	21	21
(Philippines) Kennevic Asuncion	9	13
(Laos) Mouanevongsa Sathien	21	21
(Cambodia) Saravuth Prum	10	15
(Philippines) Christopher Flores	12	5
(Thailand) Boonsak Ponsana	21	21
(Vietnam) Nguyễn Quang Minh	4	14
(Malaysia) Kuan Beng Hong	21	21
(Singapore) Kendrick Lee	14	21	21
(Indonesia) Sony Dwi Kuncoro	21	12	18

Quarter finals
(Indonesia) Taufik Hidayat	13	21	23
(Malaysia) Yeoh Kay Bin	21	3	21
(Thailand) Poompat Sapkulchananart	21	13	18
(Vietnam) Nguyễn Tiến Minh	18	21	21
(Laos) Mouanevongsa Sathien	13	9
(Thailand) Boonsak Ponsana	21	21
(Malaysia) Kuan Beng Hong	22	13
(Singapore) Kendrick Lee	24	21

Semi finals
(Indonesia) Taufik Hidayat	21	14	21
(Vietnam) Nguyễn Tiến Minh	15	21	14
(Thailand) Boonsak Ponsana	15	20
(Singapore) Kendrick Lee	21	22

Final
(Indonesia) Taufik Hidayat	21	21
(Singapore) Kendrick Lee	15	9

- Singapore's Derek Wong replaced Ronald Susilo, who withdraw due to an injury.

=== Doubles ===
1st Round
(Indonesia) Markis Kido (Indonesia) Hendra Setiawan
Bye
(Laos) Aekachai Merngchalern (Laos) Vanhpasith Philavanhw	9	9
(Thailand) Sudket Prapakamol (Thailand) Patapol Ngernsrisuk	21	21
(Malaysia) Gan Teik Chai (Malaysia) Lin Woon Fui	21	21
(Cambodia) Sophorn Nuon (Cambodia) Bunarith Sam	9	5
(Vietnam) Trần Thanh Hải (Vietnam) Nguyễn Quang Minh	21	22
(Singapore) Khoo Kian Teck (Singapore) Muhammad Azlin Bin Latib	13	20
(Laos) Yothin Ratsavong (Laos) Phakornkham Fongmalayseng	17	17
(Malaysia) Mohd Razif Abdul Latif (Malaysia) Khoo Chung Chiat	21	21
(Philippines) Alfredo Jr. Mailon (Philippines) Christopher Flores	8	9
(Singapore) Hendra Wijaya (Singapore) Hendri Saputra	21	21
(Thailand) Tesana Panvisvas (Thailand) Songphon Anugritayawon	21	22
(Vietnam) Nguyễn Huy Giang (Vietnam) Nguyễn Hoàng Hải	10	20
(Cambodia) Saravuth Prum (Cambodia) Veasna Troeung	7	4
(Indonesia) Hendra Aprida Gunawan (Indonesia) Joko Riyadi	21	21

Quarter finals
(Indonesia) Markis Kido (Indonesia) Hendra Setiawan	21	21
(Thailand) Sudket Prapakamol (Thailand) Patapol Ngernsrisuk	16	17
(Malaysia) Gan Teik Chai (Malaysia) Lin Woon Fui	21	21
(Vietnam) Trần Thanh Hải (Vietnam) Nguyễn Quang Minh	19	13
(Malaysia) Mohd Razif Abdul Latif (Malaysia) Khoo Chung Chiat	14	21	16
(Singapore) Hendra Wijaya (Singapore) Hendri Saputra	21	17	21
(Thailand) Tesana Panvisvas (Thailand) Songphon Anugritayawon	18	9
(Indonesia) Hendra Aprida Gunawan (Indonesia) Joko Riyadi	21	21

Semi finals
(Indonesia) Markis Kido (Indonesia) Hendra Setiawan	21	21
(Malaysia) Gan Teik Chai (Malaysia) Lin Woon Fui	15	17
(Singapore) Hendra Wijaya (Singapore) Hendri Saputra	21	21
(Indonesia) Hendra Aprida Gunawan (Indonesia) Joko Riyadi	19	19

Final
(Indonesia) Markis Kido (Indonesia) Hendra Setiawan	21	21
(Singapore) Hendra Wijaya (Singapore) Hendri Saputra	17	12

== Women's Badminton ==
=== Team ===
Quarter-finals
Malaysia
Bye
8 Dec
Singapore	3
Vietnam	0
8 Dec
Laos	0
Thailand	3
8 Dec
Bye
Indonesia

Semi-finals
9 Dec
Malaysia	2
Singapore	3
9 Dec
Thailand	0
Indonesia	3

Final
10 Dec
Singapore	2
Indonesia	3

=== Singles ===
1st Round
(Malaysia) Lydia Cheah Li Ya
Bye
(Thailand) Soratja Chansrisukot	21	21
(Vietnam) Phùng Nguyễn Phương Nhi	17	15
(Singapore) Li Li
Bye
(Laos) Soutchai Xaysana	6	5
(Indonesia) Adriyanti Firdasari	21	21
(Vietnam) Nguyễn Thị Sen	8	8
(Thailand) Salakjit Ponsana	21	21
Bye
(Malaysia) Julia Wong
(Singapore) Xing Aiying	21	21
(Laos) Merngchalern Manivone	9	5
Bye
(Indonesia) Maria Kristin Yulianti

Quarter finals
(Malaysia) Lydia Cheah Li Ya	23	24	18
(Thailand) Soratja Chansrisukot	21	26	21
(Singapore) Li Li	21	15	19
(Indonesia) Adriyanti Firdasari	16	21	21
(Thailand) Salakjit Ponsana	16	12
(Malaysia) Julia Wong Pei Xian	21	21
(Singapore) Xing Aiying	17	15
(Indonesia) Maria Kristin Yulianti	21	21

Semi finals
(Thailand) Soratja Chansrisukot	15	19
(Indonesia) Adriyanti Firdasari	21	21
(Malaysia) Julia Wong	15	22
(Indonesia) Maria Kristin Yulianti	21	24

Final
(Indonesia) Adriyanti Firdasari	16	15
(Indonesia) Maria Kristin Yulianti	21	21

- Wong Mew Choo pulled out of the event because of back injury and was replaced by Lydia Cheah

=== Doubles ===
1st Round
(Singapore) Jiang Yanmei (Singapore) Li Yujia
Bye
(Malaysia) Ng Hui Lin (Malaysia) Amelia Alicia Anscelly	21	21
(Thailand) Soratja Chansrisukot (Thailand) Monthila Meemeak	13	16
(Indonesia) Liliyana Natsir (Indonesia) Vita Marissa
Bye
(Laos) Lomany Bouphakesone (Laos) Inthavanh Khonesanith	13	12
(Vietnam) Vũ Thị Trang (Vietnam) Nguyễn Thị Sen	21	21
(Laos) Sengphet Lane (Laos) Vatthanavong Phonephan	16	9
(Vietnam) Phí Thị Quỳnh Mai (Vietnam) Phùng Nguyễn Phương Nhi	21	21
Bye
(Thailand) Duanganong Aroonkesorn (Thailand) Kunchala Voravichitchaikul
(Indonesia) Jo Novita (Indonesia) Greysia Polii	21	21
(Singapore) Yao Lei (Singapore) Frances Liu	16	17
Bye
(Malaysia) Wong Pei Tty (Malaysia) Chin Eei Hui

Quarter finals
(Singapore) Jiang Yanmei (Singapore) Li Yujia	21	21
(Malaysia) Ng Hui Lin (Malaysia) Amelia Alicia Anscelly	12	14
(Indonesia) Liliyana Natsir (Indonesia) Vita Marissa	21	21
(Vietnam) Vũ Thị Trang (Vietnam) Nguyễn Thị Sen	8	6
(Vietnam) Phí Thị Quỳnh Mai (Vietnam) Phùng Nguyễn Phương Nhi	9	11
(Thailand) Duanganong Aroonkesorn (Thailand) Kunchala Voravichitchaikul	21	21
(Indonesia) Jo Novita (Indonesia) Greysia Polii	21	21
(Malaysia) Wong Pei Tty (Malaysia) Chin Eei Hui	16	10

Semi finals
(Singapore) Jiang Yanmei (Singapore) Li Yujia	21	13	13
(Indonesia) Liliyana Natsir (Indonesia) Vita Marissa	17	21	21
(Thailand) Duanganong Aroonkesorn (Thailand) Kunchala Voravichitchaikul	14	21	15
(Indonesia) Jo Novita (Indonesia) Greysia Polii	21	18	21

Final
(Indonesia) Liliyana Natsir (Indonesia) Vita Marissa	21	21
(Indonesia) Jo Novita (Indonesia) Greysia Polii	15	14

== Mixed ==
=== Doubles ===
1st Round
(Indonesia) Nova Widianto (Indonesia) Liliyana Natsir
Bye
(Laos) Mouanevongsa Sathien (Laos) Vatthanavong Phonephan	6	4
(Singapore) Hendra Wijaya (Singapore) Jiang Yanmei	21	21
(Thailand) Sudket Prapakamol (Thailand) Saralee Thungthongkam
Bye
(Malaysia) Mohd Zakry Abdul Latif (Malaysia) Ng Hui Lin	21	21
(Vietnam) Nguyễn Huy Giang (Vietnam) Vũ Thị Trang	13	6
(Thailand) Nuttaphon Narkthong (Thailand) Sirivannavari Nariratana	12	11
(Malaysia) Tan Wee Kiong (Malaysia) Woon Khe Wei	21	21
(Laos) Latsavong Yothin (Laos) Merngchalern Manivone	7	14
(Singapore) Hendri Saputra (Singapore) Li Yujia	21	21
(Vietnam) Nguyễn Hoàng Hải (Vietnam) Phí Thị Quỳnh Mai	19	9
(Philippines) Kennevic Asuncion (Philippines) Kennie Asuncion	21	21
Bye
(Indonesia) Flandy Limpele (Indonesia) Vita Marissa

Quarter finals
(Indonesia) Nova Widianto (Indonesia) Liliyana Natsir	21	21
(Singapore) Hendra Wijaya (Singapore) Jiang Yanmei	15	12
(Thailand) Sudket Prapakamol (Thailand) Saralee Thungthongkam	21	21
(Malaysia) Mohd Zakry Abdul Latif (Malaysia) Ng Hui Lin	11	18
(Malaysia) Tan Wee Kiong (Malaysia) Woon Khe Wei	8	12
(Singapore) Hendri Saputra (Singapore) Li Yujia	21	21
(Philippines) Kennevic Asuncion (Philippines) Kennie Asuncion	11	14
(Indonesia) Flandy Limpele (Indonesia) Vita Marissa	21	21

Semi finals
(Indonesia) Nova Widianto (Indonesia) Liliyana Natsir	21	22	16
(Thailand) Sudket Prapakamol (Thailand) Saralee Thungthongkam	13	24	21
(Singapore) Hendri Saputra (Singapore) Li Yujia	18	21	9
(Indonesia) Flandy Limpele (Indonesia) Vita Marissa	21	18	21

Final
(Thailand) Sudket Prapakamol (Thailand) Saralee Thungthongkam	14	15
(Indonesia) Flandy Limpele (Indonesia) Vita Marissa	21	21

Preceded by 2005	Badminton at the SEA Games; 2007 SEA Games	Succeeded by 2009
