= Badminton at the 2006 Asian Games – Men's team =

Men's team at the 2006 Asian Games
- Venue: Aspire Hall 3
- Dates: 30 November – 5 December
- Competitors: 62 from 9 nations

Medalists
gold medal	China; Bao Chunlai, Cai Yun, Chen Jin, Fu Haifeng, Guo Zhendong, Lin Dan, Xie Zhongbo, Zheng Bo
silver medal	South Korea; Hwang Ji-man, Hwang Jung-woon, Jung Jae-sung, Lee Hyun-il, Lee Jae-jin, Lee Yong-dae, Park Sung-hwan, Shon Seung-mo
bronze medal	Indonesia; Luluk Hadiyanto, Taufik Hidayat, Markis Kido, Sony Dwi Kuncoro, Simon Santoso, Hendra Setiawan, Nova Widianto, Alvent Yulianto
bronze medal	Malaysia; Mohd Hafiz Hashim, Koo Kien Keat, Kuan Beng Hong, Lee Chong Wei, Lin Woon Fui, Tan Boon Heong, Mohd Fairuzizuan Tazari, Wong Choong Hann

The badminton men's team tournament at the 2006 Asian Games in Doha took place from 30 November to 5 December at Aspire Hall 3.

== Schedule ==
All times are Arabia Standard Time (UTC+03:00)

Date	Time	Event
Thursday, 30 November 2006	09:00	League stage 1
Thursday, 30 November 2006	17:00	League stage 2
Saturday, 2 December 2006	13:00	League stage 3
Sunday, 3 December 2006	09:00	Repechage 1
Sunday, 3 December 2006	13:00	Repechage 2
Sunday, 3 December 2006	17:00	Repechage 3
Monday, 4 December 2006	17:00	Semifinals
Tuesday, 5 December 2006	16:00	Final

== Results ==
=== League stage ===
==== Pool A ====
Pos	Team	Pld	W	L	MF	MA
1	China	2	2	0	8	1
2	Indonesia	2	1	1	6	3
3	India	2	0	2	0	10

Source: Official website

30 November	India	0–5	China

Anup Sridhar	0–2	Lin Dan	19–21, 11–21
Sanave Thomas / Rupesh Kumar K. T.	0–2	Cai Yun / Fu Haifeng	8–21, 11–21
Parupalli Kashyap	0–2	Chen Jin	7–21, 19–21
Valiyaveetil Diju / J. B. S. Vidyadhar	0–2	Guo Zhendong / Xie Zhongbo	18–21, 8–21
Nikhil Kanetkar	0–2	Bao Chunlai	14–21, 12–21

30 November	India	0–5	Indonesia

Anup Sridhar	0–2	Taufik Hidayat	21–23, 16–21
Sanave Thomas / Rupesh Kumar K. T.	1–2	Markis Kido / Hendra Setiawan	21–19, 18–21, 13–21
Parupalli Kashyap	1–2	Simon Santoso	21–15, 13–21, 17–21
Valiyaveetil Diju / J. B. S. Vidyadhar	1–2	Luluk Hadiyanto / Alvent Yulianto	21–19, 19–21, 15–21
Nikhil Kanetkar	0–2	Sony Dwi Kuncoro	9–21, 10–21

2 December	Indonesia	1–3	China

Taufik Hidayat	1–2	Lin Dan	17–21, 21–17, 16–21
Markis Kido / Hendra Setiawan	1–2	Cai Yun / Fu Haifeng	16–21, 21–17, 13–21
Simon Santoso	2–0	Chen Jin	21–14, 21–8
Luluk Hadiyanto / Alvent Yulianto	0–2	Xie Zhongbo / Guo Zhendong	10–21, 12–21

==== Pool B ====
Pos	Team	Pld	W	L	MF	MA
1	South Korea	2	2	0	7	2
2	Thailand	2	1	1	5	4
3	Vietnam	2	0	2	2	8

Source: Official website

30 November	Vietnam	1–4	South Korea

Nguyễn Tiến Minh	2–1	Lee Hyun-il	16–21, 21–14, 21–12
Nguyễn Quang Minh	0–2	Park Sung-hwan	12–21, 13–21
Nguyễn Hoàng Hải	0–2	Hwang Jung-woon	14–21, 11–21
Trần Thanh Hải / Nguyễn Quang Minh	0–2	Jung Jae-sung / Lee Yong-dae	12–21, 13–21
Nguyễn Tiến Minh / Nguyễn Hoàng Hải	0–2	Lee Jae-jin / Hwang Ji-man	13–21, 8–21

30 November	Vietnam	1–4	Thailand

Nguyễn Tiến Minh	2–1	Boonsak Ponsana	21–18, 18–21, 21–10
Nguyễn Quang Minh	0–2	Poompat Sapkulchananart	13–21, 17–21
Nguyễn Hoàng Hải	1–2	Peerasak Wiriyaphadungphong	8–21, 21–13, 19–21
Trần Thanh Hải / Nguyễn Tiến Minh	0–2	Songphon Anugritayawon / Nattaphon Nakthong	19–21, 12–21
Nguyễn Quang Minh / Nguyễn Hoàng Hải	0–2	Sudket Prapakamol / Patapol Ngernsrisuk	12–21, 12–21

2 December	Thailand	1–3	South Korea

Boonsak Ponsana	0–2	Lee Hyun-il	17–21, 12–21
Nattaphon Nakthong / Patapol Ngernsrisuk	0–2	Jung Jae-sung / Lee Yong-dae	13–21, 17–21
Poompat Sapkulchananart	2–1	Park Sung-hwan	21–18, 16–21, 21–17
Songphon Anugritayawon / Sudket Prapakamol	0–2	Lee Jae-jin / Hwang Ji-man	20–22, 25–27

==== Pool C ====
Pos	Team	Pld	W	L	MF	MA
1	Malaysia	2	2	0	8	1
2	Japan	2	1	1	5	5
3	Hong Kong	2	0	2	1	8

Source: Official website

30 November	Japan	0–5	Malaysia

Shoji Sato	0–2	Lee Chong Wei	10–21, 18–21
Sho Sasaki	0–2	Mohd Hafiz Hashim	13–21, 13–21
Keita Masuda	0–2	Kuan Beng Hong	12–21, 6–21
Shoji Sato / Sho Sasaki	0–2	Koo Kien Keat / Tan Boon Heong	13–21, 15–21
Keita Masuda / Tadashi Otsuka	0–2	Lin Woon Fui / Mohd Fairuzizuan Tazari	19–21, 20–22

30 November	Japan	5–0	Hong Kong

Shoji Sato	2–0	Ng Wei	21–17, 21–16
Sho Sasaki	2–0	Chan Yan Kit	21–18, 21–12
Keita Masuda	2–0	Wong Wai Hong	21–11, 21–16
Shoji Sato / Sho Sasaki	2–1	Hui Wai Ho / Ng Wei	18–21, 21–12, 21–17
Keita Masuda / Tadashi Otsuka	2–0	Albertus Susanto Njoto / Yohan Hadikusumo	22–20, 22–20

2 December	Hong Kong	1–3	Malaysia

Ng Wei	2–1	Mohd Hafiz Hashim	16–21, 21–15, 21–18
Chan Yan Kit	0–2	Kuan Beng Hong	25–27, 19–21
Wong Wai Hong	0–2	Wong Choong Hann	19–21, 15–21
Albertus Susanto Njoto / Yohan Hadikusumo	1–2	Lin Woon Fui / Mohd Fairuzizuan Tazari	13–21, 21–18, 14–21

=== Repechage ===
==== Pool D ====
Pos	Team	Pld	W	L	MF	MA
1	Indonesia	2	2	0	8	2
2	Japan	2	1	1	3	5
3	Thailand	2	0	2	2	6

Source: Official website

3 December	Japan	0–5	Indonesia

Shoji Sato	0–2	Taufik Hidayat	15–21, 19–21
Sho Sasaki	1–2	Simon Santoso	19–21, 21–17, 19–21
Tadashi Otsuka	0–2	Sony Dwi Kuncoro	13–21, 9–21
Shoji Sato / Sho Sasaki	0–2	Luluk Hadiyanto / Alvent Yulianto	20–22, 14–21
Keita Masuda / Tadashi Otsuka	0–2	Markis Kido / Hendra Setiawan	22–24, 17–21

3 December	Thailand	2–3	Indonesia

Boonsak Ponsana	0–2	Taufik Hidayat	2–21, Retired
Patapol Ngernsrisuk / Nattaphon Nakthong	0–2	Markis Kido / Hendra Setiawan	18–21, 19–21
Poompat Sapkulchananart	1–2	Simon Santoso	21–19, 10–21, 14–21
Sudket Prapakamol / Songphon Anugritayawon	2–0	Luluk Hadiyanto / Alvent Yulianto	Walkover
Tanongsak Saensomboonsuk	2–0	Sony Dwi Kuncoro	Walkover

3 December	Japan	3–0	Thailand

Shoji Sato	2–0	Poompat Sapkulchananart	21–6, 21–13
Sho Sasaki	2–0	Peerasak Wiriyaphadungphong	22–20, 21–15
Keita Masuda	2–0	Tanongsak Saensomboonsuk	21–19, 21–14

=== Knockout stage ===
Semifinals
A1	China	3
D1	Indonesia	1
B1	South Korea	3
C1	Malaysia	1

Final
A1	China	3
B1	South Korea	2

==== Semifinals ====
4 December	China	3–1	Indonesia

Lin Dan	2–1	Taufik Hidayat	22–20, 13–21, 21–12
Cai Yun / Fu Haifeng	1–2	Markis Kido / Hendra Setiawan	14–21, 21–18, 16–21
Chen Jin	2–1	Simon Santoso	21–19, 16–21, 21–14
Xie Zhongbo / Guo Zhendong	2–1	Luluk Hadiyanto / Alvent Yulianto	6–21, 21–6, 21–16

4 December	South Korea	3–1	Malaysia

Lee Hyun-il	2–0	Lee Chong Wei	21–19, 21–19
Jung Jae-sung / Lee Yong-dae	2–1	Lin Woon Fui / Mohd Fairuzizuan Tazari	19–21, 22–20, 21–16
Park Sung-hwan	1–2	Mohd Hafiz Hashim	12–21, 21–11, 17–21
Lee Jae-jin / Hwang Ji-man	2–0	Koo Kien Keat / Tan Boon Heong	21–14, 23–21

==== Final ====
5 December	China	3–2	South Korea

Lin Dan	1–2	Lee Hyun-il	20–22, 21–11, 13–21
Cai Yun / Fu Haifeng	2–0	Jung Jae-sung / Lee Yong-dae	21–19, 21–14
Chen Jin	2–1	Park Sung-hwan	18–21, 21–6, 21–11
Xie Zhongbo / Guo Zhendong	1–2	Lee Jae-jin / Hwang Ji-man	17–21, 21–13, 14–21
Bao Chunlai	2–0	Shon Seung-mo	21–9, 21–8

== Non-participating athletes ==
- Nova Widianto (INA)
- Chetan Anand (IND)
