= 2006 IBF World Championships – Mixed doubles =

Mixed doubles at the 2006 IBF World Championships
- Venue: Palacio de Deportes de la Comunidad de Madrid
- Location: Madrid, Spain
- Dates: September 18, 2006 – September 24, 2006

Medalists
gold medal	Nathan Robertson; Gail Emms	England
silver medal	Anthony Clark; Donna Kellogg	England
bronze medal	Koo Kien Keat; Wong Pei Tty	Malaysia
bronze medal	Sudket Prapakamol; Saralee Thungthongkam	Thailand

The International Badminton Foundation (abbreviated IBF, now called the Badminton World Foundation) hosted the 2006 World Championships in Madrid, Spain in September of 2006. Mixed doubles has been an event at the World Championships since 1977. The following article lists the results of mixed doubles at the 2006 IBF World Champsionships, the 15th tournament of the event.

== Seeds ==
1. (Indonesia) Nova Widianto / Liliyana Natsir
2. (South Korea) Lee Jae-jin / Lee Hyo-jung
3. (England) Nathan Robertson / Gail Emms
4. (China) Zhang Jun / Gao Ling
5. (England) Anthony Clark / Donna Kellogg
6. (Denmark) Jens Eriksen / Mette Schjoldager
7. (Denmark) Thomas Laybourn / Kamilla Rytter Juhl
8. (Thailand) Sudket Prapakamol / Saralee Thoungthongkam
9. (Thailand) Songpol Anukritayawan / Kunchala Vorawichitchaikul
10. (England) Blair / Natalie Munt
11. (Germany) Ingo Kindervater / Kathrin Piotrowski
12. (South Korea) Lee Yong-dae / Hwang Yu-mi
13. (Poland) Robert Mateusiak / Nadieżda Kostiuczyk
14. (Denmark) Lars Paaske / Helle Nielsen
15. (China) Xie Zhongbo / Zhang Yawen
16. (China) Zheng Bo / Zhao Tingting

== Results ==
=== Section 1 ===
First Round
1	(Indonesia) Nova Widianto (Indonesia) Liliyana Natsir
Bye; Bye
(Croatia) Neven Rihtar (Croatia) Maja Šavor
Bye; Bye
9/16	(Thailand) Songphon Anugritayawon (Thailand) Kunchala Vorawichitchaikul	23	17	11
(Malaysia) Koo Kien Keat (Malaysia) Pei Tty Wong	21	21	21
(Singapore) Hendra Wijaya (Singapore) Frances Liu	21	21
(Nigeria) Orobosa Okuonghae (Nigeria) Grace Daniel	8	13
5/8	(Denmark) Jens Eriksen (Denmark) Mette Schjoldager
Bye; Bye
(Denmark) Jonas Rasmussen (Denmark) Britta Andersen	21	21
(England) Jenny Wallwork (England) Kristian Roebuck	15	16
9/16	(England) Robert Blair (England) Natalie Munt	21	21
(Japan) Keita Masuda (Japan) Tomomi Matsuda	16	18
(Belgium) Wouter Claes (Belgium) Nathalie Descamps	13	16
(Chinese Taipei) Tsai Chia-hsin (Chinese Taipei) Cheng Wen-hsing	21	21

Second Round
1	(Indonesia) Widianto (Indonesia) Natsir	21	21
(Croatia) Rihtar (Croatia) Šavor	11	10
(Malaysia) Koo (Malaysia) Wong	16	21	21
(Singapore) Wijaya (Singapore) Liu	21	18	15
5/8	(Denmark) Eriksen (Denmark) Schjoldager
(Denmark) Rasmussen (Denmark) Andersen	WO
9/16	(England) Blair (England) Munt	29	22
(Chinese Taipei) Tsai (Chinese Taipei) Cheng	27	20

Third Round
1	(Indonesia) Widianto (Indonesia) Natsir	15	21	20
(Malaysia) Koo (Malaysia) Wong	21	18	22
(Denmark) Rasmussen (Denmark) Andersen	18	21	24
9/16	(England) Blair (England) Munt	21	18	22

Quarter Finals
(Malaysia) Koo (Malaysia) Wong	21	21
(Denmark) Rasmussen (Denmark) Andersen	16	16

=== Section 2 ===
First Round
3/4	(China) Zhang Jun (China) Gao Ling
Bye; Bye
(Sweden) Henri Hurskainen (Sweden) Johanna Persson
Bye; Bye
9/16	(Denmark) Lars Paaske (Denmark) Helle Nielsen	21	17	14
(China) Zhang Wei (China) Yu Yang	14	21	21
(Poland) Adam Cwalina (Poland) Małgorzata Kurdelska	'21	19	16
(France) Jean-Michael Lefort (France) Weny Rahmawati	9	21	21
5/8	(England) Anthony Clark (England) Donna Kellogg
Bye; Bye
(Spain) Patricia Perez (Spain) Inigo Serrano	13	23	18
(Canada) Mike Beres (Canada) Valerie Loker	21	21	21
9/16	(South Korea) Lee Yong-dae (South Korea) Hwang Yu-mi	21	21
(Scotland) Keith Turnbull (Scotland) Emma Mason	14	7
(Russia) Alexej Vasiljev (Russia) Anna Efremova	12	17
(Germany) Kristof Hopp (Germany) Birgit Overzier	21	21

Second Round
3/4	(China) Zhang (China) Gao	21	21
(Sweden) Hurskainen (Sweden) Persson	7	6
(China) Zhang (China) Yu	21	21
(France) Lefort (France) Rahmawati	9	12
5/8	(England) Clark (England) Kellogg	21	21
(Canada) Beres (Canada) Loker	15	8
9/16	(South Korea) Lee (South Korea) Hwang	21	19	18
(Germany) Hopp (Germany) Overzier	18	21	21

Third Round
3/4	(China) Zhang (China) Gao	21	21
(China) Zhang (China) Yu	17	18
5/8	(England) Clark (England) Kellogg	21	21
(Germany) Hopp (Germany) Overzier	19	15

Quarter Finals
(China) Zhang (China) Gao	18	17
5/8	(England) Clark (England) Kellogg	21	21

=== Section 3 ===
First Round
(Malaysia) Mohd Fairuzizuan Mohd Tazari (Malaysia) Ooi Sock Ai	21	21
(Spain) Sergio Llopis (Spain) Dolores Marco	19	16
9/16	(Germany) Ingo Kindervater (Germany) Kathrin Piotrowski	21	21
(United States) Nicholas Jinadasa (United States) Samantha Jinadasa	10	10
(Austria) Michael Lahnsteiner (Austria) Tina Riedl	21	15	18
(Vietnam) Trần Thanh Hải (Vietnam) Lê Ngọc Nguyên Nhung	16	21	21
bye bye
5/8	(Denmark) Thomas Laybourn (Denmark) Kamilla Rytter Juhl
(Netherlands) Jürgen Wouters (Netherlands) Paulien van Dooremalen	19	21	21
(Slovenia) Luka Petrič (Slovenia) Maja Tvrdy	21	17	16
(Singapore) Hendri Saputra (Singapore) Li Yujia	22	13	15
9/16	(China) Zheng Bo (China) Zhao Tingting	20	21	21
(Scotland) Watson Briggs (Scotland) Imogen Bankier	21	21
(Bulgaria) Stilian Makarski (Bulgaria) Diana Dimova	15	19
bye bye
3/4	(England) Nathan Robertson (England) Gail Emms

Second Round
(Malaysia) Mohd Tazari (Malaysia) Ooi	21	23	21
9/16	(Germany) Kindervater (Germany) Piotrowski	12	25	14
(Vietnam) Trần (Vietnam) Lê	12	4
5/8	(Denmark) Laybourn (Denmark) Rytter Juhl	21	21
(Netherlands) Wouters (Netherlands) Van Dooremalen	10	6
9/16	(China) Zheng (China) Zhao	21	21
(Scotland) Briggs (Scotland) Bankier	12	10
3/4	(England) Robertson (England) Emms	21	21

Third Round
(Malaysia) Mohd Tazari (Malaysia) Ooi	11	13
5/8	(Denmark) Laybourn (Denmark) Rytter Juhl	21	21
9/16	(China) Zheng (China) Zhao	14	16
3/4	(England) Robertson (England) Emms	21	21

Quarter Finals
5/8	(Denmark) Laybourn (Denmark) Rytter Juhl	14	17
3/4	(England) Robertson (England) Emms	21	21

=== Section 4 ===
First Round
(Malaysia) Gan Teik Chai (Malaysia) Fong Chew Yen	21	17	21
(India) Valiyaveetil Diju (India) Jwala Gutta	18	21	19
9/16	(Poland) Robert Mateusiak (Poland) Nadieżda Kostiuczyk	21	21
(Japan) Shintaro Ikeda (Japan) Satoko Suetsuna	15	16
(Portugal) Alexandre Paixão (Portugal) Filipa Lamy	18	16
(France) Svetoslav Stoyanov (France) Élodie Eymard	21	21
bye bye
5/8	(Thailand) Sudket Prapakamol (Thailand) Saralee Thungthongkam
(Russia) Vitalij Durkin (Russia) Marina Yakusheva	21	21
(Slovakia) Michal Matejka (Slovakia) Eva Sládeková	6	8
(Nepal) Pashupati Paneru (Nepal) Sumina Shrestha	8	8
9/16	(China) Xie Zhongbo (China) Zhang Yawen	21	21
bye bye
(Canada) William Milroy (Canada) Tammy Sun
bye bye
2	(South Korea) Lee Jae-jin (South Korea) Lee Hyo-jung

Second Round
(Malaysia) Gan (Malaysia) Fong	21	17	16
9/16	(Poland) Mateusiak (Poland) Kostiuczyk	17	21	21
(France) Stoyanov (France) Eymard	13	12
5/8	(Thailand) Prapakamol (Thailand) Thungthongkam	21	21
(Russia) Durkin (Russia) Yakusheva	21	20
9/16	(China) Xie (China) Zhang	23	22
(Canada) Milroy (Canada) Sun	WO
2	(South Korea) Lee (South Korea) Lee

Third Round
9/16	(Poland) Mateusiak (Poland) Kostiuczyk	15	23	16
5/8	(Thailand) Prapakamol (Thailand) Thungthongkam	21	21	21
9/16	(China) Xie (China) Zhang	21	21
(Canada) Milroy (Canada) Sun	12	11

Quarter Finals
5/8	(Thailand) Prapakamol (Thailand) Thungthongkam	12	21	21
9/16	(China) Xie (China) Zhang	21	16	12

== Finals ==
Quarterfinals
(Malaysia) Koo Kien Keat (Malaysia) Wong Pei Tty	21	21
(Denmark) Jonas Rasmussen (Denmark) Britta Andersen	16	16
3/4	(China) Zhang Jun (China) Gao Ling	18	17
5/8	(England) Anthony Clark (England) Donna Kellogg	21	21
5/8	(Denmark) Thomas Laybourn (Denmark) Kamilla Rytter Juhl	14	17
3/4	(England) Nathan Robertson (England) Gail Emms	21	21
5/8	(Thailand) Sudket Prapakamol (Thailand) Saralee Thungthongkam	12	21	21
9/16	(China) Xie Zhongbo (China) Zhang Yawen	21	16	12

Semifinals
(Malaysia) Koo Kien Keat (Malaysia) Wong Pei Tty	14	12
5/8	(England) Anthony Clark (England) Donna Kellogg	21	21
3/4	(England) Nathan Robertson (England) Gail Emms	21	17	25
5/8	(Thailand) Sudket Prapakamol (Thailand) Saralee Thungthongkam	18	21	23

Finals
5/8	(England) Anthony Clark (England) Donna Kellogg	15	12
3/4	(England) Nathan Robertson (England) Gail Emms	21	21
