= 2005 Asian Junior Badminton Championships – Girls' team =

Badminton championship in Jakarta, Indonesia

Girls' team at the 2005 Asian Junior Badminton Championships
- Venue: Tennis Indoor Senayan
- Location: Jakarta, Indonesia
- Dates: 11–14 July 2005

The girls' team tournament at the 2005 Asian Junior Badminton Championships took place from 11 to 14 July 2005 at the Tennis Indoor Senayan Stadium in Jakarta, Indonesia. A total of 12 countries competed in this event.

== Results ==
=== Bracket ===
Round of 16
Singapore	3
Sri Lanka	0
Myanmar	0
Hong Kong	3
Malaysia	3
North Korea	0
Chinese Taipei	3
Vietnam	0

Quarter-finals
China	3
Singapore	0
Indonesia	3
Hong Kong	0
Malaysia	3
Japan	0
Chinese Taipei	0
South Korea	3

Semi-finals
China	3
Indonesia	1
Malaysia	3
South Korea	0

Final
China	3
Malaysia	0

=== Semi-finals ===
China
3
Tennis Indoor Senayan
13 July 2005

Indonesia
1

			1	2	3
1	(China) (Indonesia)	Wang Lin; Bellaetrix Manuputty	11; 6	11; 4
2	(China) (Indonesia)	Wang Yihan; Rosaria Yusfin Pungkasari	11; 8	11; 2
3	(China) (Indonesia)	Tai Yi; Pia Zebadiah Bernadet	2; 11	9; 11
4	(China) (Indonesia)	Cheng Shu / Liao Jingmei; Nitya Krishinda Maheswari / Greysia Polii	15; 6	15; 8
5	(China) (Indonesia)	Liu Lan / Ma Jin; Pia Zebadiah Bernadet / Yulianti				not played

South Korea
0
Tennis Indoor Senayan
13 July 2005

Malaysia
3

			1	2	3
1	(South Korea) (Malaysia)	Jang Soo-young; Norshahliza Baharum	1; 11	11; 8	2; 11
2	(South Korea) (Malaysia)	Choi Joo-min; Julia Wong	11; 5	2; 11	2; 11
3	(South Korea) (Malaysia)	Yoo Hyun-young; Lyddia Cheah	11; 4	4; 11	9; 11
4	(South Korea) (Malaysia)	Ha Jung-eun / Hong Soo-jung; Julia Wong / Haw Chiou Hwee				not played
5	(South Korea) (Malaysia)	Chang Ye-na / Choi A-reum; Chong Sook Chin / Ng Hui Lin				not played

=== Final ===
China
3
Tennis Indoor Senayan
14 July 2005

Malaysia
0

			1	2	3
1	(China) (Malaysia)	Wang Lin; Norshahliza Baharum	11; 3	11; 5
2	(China) (Malaysia)	Wang Yihan; Julia Wong	11; 7	11; 7
3	(China) (Malaysia)	Tai Yi; Lyddia Cheah	11; 0	11; 13	11; 9
4	(China) (Malaysia)	Cheng Shu / Liao Jingmei; Julia Wong / Haw Chiou Hwee				not played
5	(China) (Malaysia)	Lu Lan / Ma Jin; Chong Sook Chin / Ng Hui Lin				not played
