= Badminton at the 2006 Asian Games – Men's doubles =

Men's doubles at the 2006 Asian Games
- Venue: Aspire Hall 3
- Dates: 5–9 December
- Competitors: 50 from 16 nations

Medalists
gold medal	Koo Kien Keat; Tan Boon Heong	Malaysia
silver medal	Luluk Hadiyanto; Alvent Yulianto	Indonesia
bronze medal	Markis Kido; Hendra Setiawan	Indonesia
bronze medal	Jung Jae-sung; Lee Yong-dae	South Korea

The badminton men's doubles tournament at the 2006 Asian Games in Doha took place from 5 December to 9 December at Aspire Hall 3.

== Schedule ==
All times are Arabia Standard Time (UTC+03:00)

Date	Time	Event
Tuesday, 5 December 2006	11:30	Round of 32
Wednesday, 6 December 2006	15:00	Round of 32
Thursday, 7 December 2006	09:00	Round of 16
Thursday, 7 December 2006	20:00	Quarterfinals
Friday, 8 December 2006	19:00	Semifinals
Saturday, 9 December 2006	19:00	Final

== Results ==
=== Final ===
Final
	Koo Kien Keat (MAS); Tan Boon Heong (MAS)	21	21
5	Luluk Hadiyanto (INA); Alvent Yulianto (INA)	13	14

=== Top half ===
Round of 32
Chan Io Chong (MAC); Lo Ion Weng (MAC)	10	11
Sudket Prapakamol (THA); Patapol Ngernsrisuk (THA)	21	21
Sayed Hamed Ebrahim (BRN); Sayed Jaafar Ebrahim (BRN)	1	3
Koo Kien Keat (MAS); Tan Boon Heong (MAS)	21	21
Shoji Sato (JPN); Sho Sasaki (JPN)	18	15
Hendri Saputra (SIN); Hendra Wijaya (SIN)	21	21
Diluka Karunaratne (SRI); Dinuka Karunaratne (SRI)	6	9
Sanave Thomas (IND); Rupesh Kumar K. T. (IND)	21	21

Round of 16
1	Fu Haifeng (CHN); Cai Yun (CHN)	21	23
Sudket Prapakamol (THA); Patapol Ngernsrisuk (THA)	9	21
8	Lee Jae-jin (KOR); Hwang Ji-man (KOR)	18	14
Koo Kien Keat (MAS); Tan Boon Heong (MAS)	21	21
3	Markis Kido (INA); Hendra Setiawan (INA)	21	21
Hendri Saputra (SIN); Hendra Wijaya (SIN)	14	17
7	Albertus Susanto Njoto (HKG); Yohan Hadikusumo (HKG)	24	17
Sanave Thomas (IND); Rupesh Kumar K. T. (IND)	26	21

Quarterfinals
1	Fu Haifeng (CHN); Cai Yun (CHN)	9	19
Koo Kien Keat (MAS); Tan Boon Heong (MAS)	21	21
3	Markis Kido (INA); Hendra Setiawan (INA)	18	21	21
Sanave Thomas (IND); Rupesh Kumar K. T. (IND)	21	9	11

Semifinals
Koo Kien Keat (MAS); Tan Boon Heong (MAS)	21	21
3	Markis Kido (INA); Hendra Setiawan (INA)	16	13

=== Bottom half ===
Round of 32
Leong Kin Fai (MAC); Lam Chi Man (MAC)	21	21
Francisco Yong (TLS); Tes Fac Sing (TLS)	11	13
Olonbayaryn Enkhbat (MGL); Battöriin Davaasüren (MGL)	7	6
5	Luluk Hadiyanto (INA); Alvent Yulianto (INA)	21	21
Nguyễn Quang Minh (VIE); Trần Thanh Hải (VIE)	8	10
Guo Zhendong (CHN); Zheng Bo (CHN)	21	21
Songphon Anugritayawon (THA); Nattaphon Nakthong (THA)	21	21
Tarek Shalhoum (SYR); Mohammad Al-Sawas (SYR)	10	10
Valiyaveetil Diju (IND); J. B. S. Vidyadhar (IND)	21	21
Hui Wai Ho (HKG); Wong Wai Hong (HKG)	13	10

Round of 16
Leong Kin Fai (MAC); Lam Chi Man (MAC)	4	7
5	Luluk Hadiyanto (INA); Alvent Yulianto (INA)	21	21
Guo Zhendong (CHN); Zheng Bo (CHN)	22	25
4	Mohd Fairuzizuan Tazari (MAS); Lin Woon Fui (MAS)	20	23
Songphon Anugritayawon (THA); Nattaphon Nakthong (THA)	14	9
6	Keita Masuda (JPN); Tadashi Otsuka (JPN)	21	21
Valiyaveetil Diju (IND); J. B. S. Vidyadhar (IND)	16	14
2	Jung Jae-sung (KOR); Lee Yong-dae (KOR)	21	21

Quarterfinals
5	Luluk Hadiyanto (INA); Alvent Yulianto (INA)	15	21	21
Guo Zhendong (CHN); Zheng Bo (CHN)	21	18	14
6	Keita Masuda (JPN); Tadashi Otsuka (JPN)	13	21	11
2	Jung Jae-sung (KOR); Lee Yong-dae (KOR)	21	16	21

Semifinals
5	Luluk Hadiyanto (INA); Alvent Yulianto (INA)	23	21	21
2	Jung Jae-sung (KOR); Lee Yong-dae (KOR)	25	18	19
