= Badminton at the 2011 SEA Games – Mixed doubles =

Badminton tournament

These are the results of the mixed doubles competition in badminton at the 2011 SEA Games in Jakarta.

== Medal winners ==
Gold	Silver	Bronze
Tontowi Ahmad (INA); Liliyana Natsir (INA)	Sudket Prapakamol (THA); Saralee Thungthongkam (THA)	Songphon Anugritayawon (THA); Kunchala Voravichitchaikul (THA) Muhammad Rijal (INA); Debby Susanto (INA)

== Draw ==
First round
1	(Indonesia) Tontowi Ahmad (Indonesia) Liliyana Natsir
Bye
(Singapore) Chayut Triyachart (Singapore) Yao Lei	19	21	21
(Vietnam) Dương Bảo Đức (Vietnam) Thái Thị Hồng Gấm	21	9	11
3	(Thailand) Songphon Anugritayawon (Thailand) Kunchala Voravichitchaikul	21	21
(Myanmar) Ye Min Aung (Myanmar) Khin Gone Yi Linn	10	12
(Philippines) Antonino Benjamin Gadi (Philippines) Gelita Castilo	21	21
(Malaysia) Mohd Lutfi Zaim (Malaysia) Lai Pei Jing	19	18
(Myanmar) Than Lwin Aung (Myanmar) Phu Pwint Zan	15	9
(Philippines) Ronel Estanislao (Philippines) Malvinne Alcala	21	21
(Singapore) Johnathan Tang (Singapore) Thng Ting Ting	10	7
4	(Indonesia) Muhammad Rijal (Indonesia) Debby Susanto	21	21
(Malaysia) Ong Jian Guo (Malaysia) Chong Sook Chin	21	21
(Vietnam) Nguyễn Hoàng Hải (Vietnam) Lê Thu Huyền	17	18
Bye
2	(Thailand) Sudket Prapakamol (Thailand) Saralee Thungthongkam

Quarterfinals
1	(Indonesia) Tontowi Ahmad (Indonesia) Liliyana Natsir	21	21
(Singapore) Chayut Triyachart (Singapore) Yao Lei	9	18
3	(Thailand) Songphon Anugritayawon (Thailand) Kunchala Voravichitchaikul	21	21
(Philippines) Antonino Benjamin Gadi (Philippines) Gelita Castilo	13	10
(Philippines) Ronel Estanislao (Philippines) Malvinne Alcala	9	13
4	(Indonesia) Muhammad Rijal (Indonesia) Debby Susanto	21	21
(Malaysia) Ong Jian Guo (Malaysia) Chong Sook Chin	8	21	13
2	(Thailand) Sudket Prapakamol (Thailand) Saralee Thungthongkam	21	19	21

Semifinals
1	(Indonesia) Tontowi Ahmad (Indonesia) Liliyana Natsir	21	21
3	(Thailand) Songphon Anugritayawon (Thailand) Kunchala Voravichitchaikul	19	14
4	(Indonesia) Muhammad Rijal (Indonesia) Debby Susanto	11	14
2	(Thailand) Sudket Prapakamol (Thailand) Saralee Thungthongkam	21	21

Finals
1	(Indonesia) Tontowi Ahmad (Indonesia) Liliyana Natsir	21	21
2	(Thailand) Sudket Prapakamol (Thailand) Saralee Thungthongkam	7	14
