= Badminton at the 2009 SEA Games =

- Venue: Gym Hall 1, National Sports Complex
- Date: 11–17 December 2009
- Nations: 8

The badminton tournament at the 2009 SEA Games was held from December 11 to December 17 in Gym Hall 1, National Sports Complex Vientiane of Laos. The men's and women's tournament have no age limit.

== Medal tally ==
Rank	Nation	Gold	Silver	Bronze	Total
1	Indonesia (INA)	4	2	2	8
2	Malaysia (MAS)	2	2	5	9
3	Thailand (THA)	1	2	4	7
4	Singapore (SIN)	0	1	2	3
5	Vietnam (VIE)	0	0	1	1
Totals (5 entries)		7	7	14	28

== Medalists ==
Event	Gold	Silver	Bronze
Men's singles	Simon Santoso; Indonesia	Sony Dwi Kuncoro; Indonesia	Nguyễn Hoàng Hải; Vietnam
Men's singles	Simon Santoso; Indonesia	Sony Dwi Kuncoro; Indonesia	Tanongsak Saensomboonsuk; Thailand
Women's singles	Salakjit Ponsana; Thailand	Ratchanok Intanon; Thailand	Wong Mew Choo; Malaysia
Women's singles	Salakjit Ponsana; Thailand	Ratchanok Intanon; Thailand	Lydia Cheah Li Ya; Malaysia
Men's doubles	Indonesia; Markis Kido; Hendra Setiawan	Malaysia; Koo Kien Keat; Tan Boon Heong	Malaysia; Mohd Fairuzizuan Mohd Tazari; Mohd Zakry Abdul Latif
Men's doubles	Indonesia; Markis Kido; Hendra Setiawan	Malaysia; Koo Kien Keat; Tan Boon Heong	Indonesia; Mohammad Ahsan; Bona Septano
Women's doubles	Malaysia; Chin Eei Hui; Wong Pei Tty	Singapore; Shinta Mulia Sari; Yao Lei	Indonesia; Meiliana Jauhari; Shendy Puspa Irawati
Women's doubles	Malaysia; Chin Eei Hui; Wong Pei Tty	Singapore; Shinta Mulia Sari; Yao Lei	Thailand; Savitree Amitrapai; Vacharaporn Munkit
Mixed doubles	Indonesia; Nova Widianto; Liliyana Natsir	Thailand; Songphon Anugritayawon; Kunchala Voravichitchaikul	Malaysia; Chan Peng Soon; Goh Liu Ying
Mixed doubles	Indonesia; Nova Widianto; Liliyana Natsir	Thailand; Songphon Anugritayawon; Kunchala Voravichitchaikul	Malaysia; Koo Kien Keat; Wong Pei Tty
Men's teams	Indonesia; Simon Santoso; Sony Dwi Kuncoro; Tommy Sugiarto; Markis Kido; Hendra Setiawan; Mohammad Ahsan; Bona Septano; Nova Widianto; Devin Lahardi Fitriawan	Malaysia; Liew Daren; Muhammad Hafiz Hashim; Kuan Beng Hong; Koo Kien Keat; Tan Boon Heong; Mohd Fairuzizuan Mohd Tazari; Mohd Zakry Abdul Latif; Chan Peng Soon	Singapore; Derek Wong; Ashton Chen Yong Zhao; Ronald Susilo; Hendri Saputra; Hendra Wijaya; Terry Yeo; Jonathan Tang; Jeffrey Wong; Kendrick Lee Yen Hui; Kelvin Ho Ying Chong
Men's teams	Indonesia; Simon Santoso; Sony Dwi Kuncoro; Tommy Sugiarto; Markis Kido; Hendra Setiawan; Mohammad Ahsan; Bona Septano; Nova Widianto; Devin Lahardi Fitriawan	Malaysia; Liew Daren; Muhammad Hafiz Hashim; Kuan Beng Hong; Koo Kien Keat; Tan Boon Heong; Mohd Fairuzizuan Mohd Tazari; Mohd Zakry Abdul Latif; Chan Peng Soon	Thailand; Boonsak Ponsana; Tanongsak Saensomboonsuk; Pakkawat Vilailak; Nuttaphon Narkthong; Patiphat Chalardchaleam; Sudket Prapakamol; Songphon Anugritayawon; Bodin Isara; Maneepong Jongjit
Women's team	Malaysia; Wong Mew Choo; Lydia Cheah Li Ya; Sannatasah Saniru; Chin Eei Hui; Wong Pei Tty; Ng Hui Lin; Woon Khe Wei; Goh Liu Ying; Chong Sook Chin	Indonesia; Maria Kristin Yulianti; Adriyanti Firdasari; Lindaweni Fanetri; Greysia Polii; Nitya Krishinda Maheswari; Shendy Puspa Irawati; Meiliana Jauhari; Liliyana Natsir; Lita Nurlita	Singapore; Zhang Beiwen; Xing Aiying; Fu Mingtian; Yao Lei; Shinta Mulia Sari; Vanessa Neo; Frances Liu; Li Yujia
Women's team	Malaysia; Wong Mew Choo; Lydia Cheah Li Ya; Sannatasah Saniru; Chin Eei Hui; Wong Pei Tty; Ng Hui Lin; Woon Khe Wei; Goh Liu Ying; Chong Sook Chin	Indonesia; Maria Kristin Yulianti; Adriyanti Firdasari; Lindaweni Fanetri; Greysia Polii; Nitya Krishinda Maheswari; Shendy Puspa Irawati; Meiliana Jauhari; Liliyana Natsir; Lita Nurlita	Thailand; Salakjit Ponsana; Porntip Buranaprasertsuk; Ratchanok Intanon; Duanganong Aroonkesorn; Kunchala Voravichitchaikul; Saralee Thungthongkam; Sapsiree Taerattanachai; Savitree Amitapai; Vacharaporn Munkit

== Men's singles ==
1st Round
(Malaysia) Liew Daren	9	15
(Vietnam) Nguyễn Hoàng Hải	21	21
(Laos) Phakornkham Fongmalayseng	21	21
(Philippines) Patricqque Magnay	5	11
(Thailand) Boonsak Ponsana	19	18
(Indonesia) Simon Santoso	21	21
(Singapore) Derek Wong	21	21
(Cambodia) Teav Yongvannak	13	16
(Singapore) Ashton Chen Yong Zhao	21	18	21
(Philippines) Jaime Junio jr.	9	21	12
(Malaysia) Muhammad Hafiz Hashim	12	21	14
(Indonesia) Sony Dwi Kuncoro	21	19	21
(Laos) Sathien Mouanevongsa	10	14
(Thailand) Tanongsak Saensomboonsuk	21	21
(Cambodia) Nuon Sophorn	12	2
(Vietnam) Nguyễn Tiến Minh	21	21

Quarterfinals
(Vietnam) Nguyễn Hoàng Hải	21	21
(Laos) Phakornkham Fongmalayseng	17	19
(Indonesia) Simon Santoso	21	21
(Singapore) Derek Wong	13	11
(Singapore) Ashton Chen Yong Zhao	9	14
(Indonesia) Sony Dwi Kuncoro	21	21
(Thailand) Tanongsak Saensomboonsuk	21	21
(Vietnam) Nguyễn Tiến Minh	18	18

Semifinals
(Vietnam) Nguyễn Hoàng Hải	7	14
(Indonesia) Simon Santoso	21	21
(Indonesia) Sony Dwi Kuncoro	21	18	21
(Thailand) Tanongsak Saensomboonsuk	10	21	17

Finals
(Indonesia) Simon Santoso	21	21
(Indonesia) Sony Dwi Kuncoro	16	12

== Women's singles ==
1st Round
(Thailand) Salakjit Ponsana
bye
(Laos) Manivone Meungchaleun
bye
(Malaysia) Wong Mew Choo
bye
(Singapore) Fu Mingtian	21	20	17
(Indonesia) Maria Kristin Yulianti	15	22	21
(Malaysia) Lydia Cheah Li Ya	14	21	21
(Vietnam) Lê Ngọc Nguyên Nhung	21	12	12
bye
(Singapore) Zhang Beiwen
bye
(Indonesia) Adriyanti Firdasari
(Laos) Souchai Xaysana	4	15
(Thailand) Ratchanok Intanon	21	21

Quarterfinals
(Thailand) Salakjit Ponsana	21	21
(Laos) Manivone Meungchaleun	6	6
(Malaysia) Wong Mew Choo	21	21
(Indonesia) Maria Kristin Yulianti	13	12
(Malaysia) Lydia Cheah Li Ya	21	21
(Singapore) Zhang Beiwen	19	18
(Indonesia) Adriyanti Firdasari	19	15
(Thailand) Ratchanok Intanon	21	21

Semifinals
(Thailand) Salakjit Ponsana	21	21
(Malaysia) Wong Mew Choo	18	14
(Malaysia) Lydia Cheah Li Ya	15	21
(Thailand) Ratchanok Intanon	21	23

Finals
(Thailand) Salakjit Ponsana	21	18	21
(Thailand) Ratchanok Intanon	14	21	10

== Men's doubles ==
1st Round
1	(Indonesia) Markis Kido (Indonesia) Hendra Setiawan
bye
(Thailand) Patiphat Chalardchaleam (Thailand) Nuttaphon Narkthong	21	21
(Cambodia) Vann Chanpisey (Cambodia) Prum Saravuth	14	11
3	(Malaysia) Mohd Fairuzizuan Mohd Tazari (Malaysia) Mohd Zakry Abdul Latif	21	18	21
(Vietnam) Đào Mạnh Thắng (Vietnam) Bùi Bằng Đức	15	21	10
(Singapore) Jonathan Tang (Singapore) Terry Yeo	21	19	21
(Laos) Vatsana Keobounmy (Laos) Vanhpasith Philavanh	14	21	8
(Laos) Yothin Latsavong (Laos) Chanda Vanvilay	21	21
(Philippines) Jaime Junio jr. (Philippines) Patricque Magnay	6	14
(Cambodia) Nuon Sophorn (Cambodia) Teav Yongvannak	13	7
4	(Indonesia) Mohammad Ahsan (Indonesia) Bona Septano	21	21
(Vietnam) Dương Bảo Đức (Vietnam) Phạm Cao Hiếu	21	15	18
(Singapore) Hendra Wijaya (Singapore) Jeffrey Wong	18	21	21
(Thailand) Bodin Isara (Thailand) Maneepong Jongjit	21	12	21
2	(Malaysia) Koo Kien Keat (Malaysia) Tan Boon Heong	14	21	23

Quarterfinals
1	(Indonesia) Markis Kido (Indonesia) Hendra Setiawan	21	21
(Thailand) Patiphat Chalardchaleam (Thailand) Nuttaphon Narkthong	18	18
3	(Malaysia) Mohd Fairuzizuan Mohd Tazari (Malaysia) Mohd Zakry Abdul Latif	21	19	21
(Singapore) Jonathan Tang (Singapore) Terry Yeo	12	21	13
(Laos) Yothin Latsavong (Laos) Chanda Vanvilay	13	11
4	(Indonesia) Mohammad Ahsan (Indonesia) Bona Septano	21	21
(Singapore) Hendra Wijaya (Singapore) Jeffrey Wong	19	6
2	(Malaysia) Koo Kien Keat (Malaysia) Tan Boon Heong	21	21

Semifinals
1	(Indonesia) Markis Kido (Indonesia) Hendra Setiawan	27	15	21
3	(Malaysia) Mohd Fairuzizuan Mohd Tazari (Malaysia) Mohd Zakry Abdul Latif	25	21	16
4	(Indonesia) Mohammad Ahsan (Indonesia) Bona Septano	16	10
2	(Malaysia) Koo Kien Keat (Malaysia) Tan Boon Heong	21	21

Finals
1	(Indonesia) Markis Kido (Indonesia) Hendra Setiawan	21	21
2	(Malaysia) Koo Kien Keat (Malaysia) Tan Boon Heong	17	17

== Women's doubles ==
1st Round
1	(Malaysia) Chin Eei Hui (Malaysia) Wong Pei Tty
bye
(Singapore) Frances Liu (Singapore) Vanessa Neo
bye
3	(Indonesia) Shendy Puspa Irawati (Indonesia) Meiliana Jauhari
bye
(Thailand) Duanganong Aroonkesorn (Thailand) Kunchala Voravichitchaikul	21	21
(Laos) Bouphakesone Lomany (Laos) Phonephan Vatthanavong	12	8
(Laos) Khonesanith Inthavanh (Laos) Manivone Meungchaleun	8	11
(Malaysia) Chong Sook Chin (Malaysia) Woon Khe Wei	21	21
bye
(Singapore) Shinta Mulia Sari (Singapore) Yao Lei
(Vietnam) Lê Ngọc Nguyên Nhung (Vietnam) Thái Thị Hồng Gấm	7	21	9
(Thailand) Savitree Amitrapai (Thailand) Vacharaporn Munkit	21	15	21
bye
2	(Indonesia) Nitya Krishinda Maheswari (Indonesia) Greysia Polii

Quarterfinals
1	(Malaysia) Chin Eei Hui (Malaysia) Wong Pei Tty	21	23
(Singapore) Frances Liu (Singapore) Vanessa Neo	11	21
3	(Indonesia) Shendy Puspa Irawati (Indonesia) Meiliana Jauhari	21	21
(Thailand) Duanganong Aroonkesorn (Thailand) Kunchala Voravichitchaikul	14	18
(Malaysia) Chong Sook Chin (Malaysia) Woon Khe Wei	19	21	17
4	(Singapore) Shinta Mulia Sari (Singapore) Yao Lei	21	17	21
(Thailand) Savitree Amitrapai (Thailand) Vacharaporn Munkit	21	7	21
2	(Indonesia) Nitya Krishinda Maheswari (Indonesia) Greysia Polii	19	21	10

Semifinals
1	(Malaysia) Chin Eei Hui (Malaysia) Wong Pei Tty	21	21
3	(Indonesia) Shendy Puspa Irawati (Indonesia) Meiliana Jauhari	12	15
4	(Singapore) Shinta Mulia Sari (Singapore) Yao Lei	22	12	21
(Thailand) Savitree Amitrapai (Thailand) Vacharaporn Munkit	20	21	19

Finals
1	(Malaysia) Chin Eei Hui (Malaysia) Wong Pei Tty	21	21
4	(Singapore) Shinta Mulia Sari (Singapore) Yao Lei	12	11

== Mixed doubles ==
1st Round
(Thailand) Songphon Anugritayawon (Thailand) Kunchala Voravichitchaikul
Bye
(Singapore) Hendra Wijaya (Singapore) Vanessa Neo	24	21
(Laos) Vanhpasith Philavanh (Laos) Souchai Xaysana	22	5
(Malaysia) Chan Peng Soon (Malaysia) Goh Liu Ying	21	21
(Vietnam) Dương Bảo Đức (Vietnam) Thái Thị Hồng Gấm	15	11
(Indonesia) Devin Lahardi Fitriawan (Indonesia) Lita Nurlita
Bye
(Indonesia) Nova Widianto (Indonesia) Liliyana Natsir
Bye
(Laos) Chanda Vanvilay (Laos) Bhoupakesone Lomany
Bye
(Thailand) Sudket Prapakamol (Thailand) Saralee Thungthongkam
Bye
(Malaysia) Koo Kien Keat (Malaysia) Wong Pei Tty	21	21
(Singapore) Jeffrey Wong (Singapore) Fu Mingtian	17	10

Quarterfinals
(Thailand) Songphon Anugritayawon (Thailand) Kunchala Voravichitchaikul	21	21
(Singapore) Hendra Wijaya (Singapore) Vanessa Neo	16	12
(Malaysia) Chan Peng Soon (Malaysia) Goh Liu Ying	21	16	21
(Indonesia) Devin Lahardi Fitriawan (Indonesia) Lita Nurlita	19	21	14
(Indonesia) Nova Widianto (Indonesia) Liliyana Natsir	21	21
(Laos) Chanda Vanvilay (Laos) Bhoupakesone Lomany	10	11
(Thailand) Sudket Prapakamol (Thailand) Saralee Thungthongkam	21	12	18
(Malaysia) Koo Kien Keat (Malaysia) Wong Pei Tty	19	21	21

Semifinals
(Thailand) Songphon Anugritayawon (Thailand) Kunchala Voravichitchaikul	21	21
(Malaysia) Chan Peng Soon (Malaysia) Goh Liu Ying	18	13
(Indonesia) Nova Widianto (Indonesia) Liliyana Natsir	21	21
(Malaysia) Koo Kien Keat (Malaysia) Wong Pei Tty	15	15

Finals
(Thailand) Songphon Anugritayawon (Thailand) Kunchala Voravichitchaikul	10	22	9
(Indonesia) Nova Widianto (Indonesia) Liliyana Natsir	21	20	21

== Men's team ==
Quarter-finals
Malaysia
Bye
11 December
Vietnam	2
Singapore	3
11 December
Cambodia	0
Thailand	3
11 December
Laos	0
Indonesia	3

Semi-finals
12 December
Malaysia	3
Singapore	0
12 December
Thailand	0
Indonesia	3

Final
13 December
Malaysia	1
Indonesia	3

=== Quarter-final ===
11 December	Vietnam (VIE)	2–3	Singapore (SIN)

Nguyễn Tiến Minh	2–0	Derek Wong	21-8, 21-17
Nguyễn Hoàng Nam	0–2	Ashton Chen Yong Zhao	15-21, 10-21
Nguyễn Hoàng Hải	2–0	Ronald Susilo	21-16, 21-14
Dương Bảo Đức / Phạm Cao Hiếu	1–2	Hendra Wijaya / Terry Yeo	18-21, 21-19, 16-21
Bùi Bằng Đức / Đào Mạnh Thắng	1–2	Hendri Saputra / Ronald Susilo	16-21, 23-21, 16-21

11 December	Cambodia (CAM)	0–3	Thailand (THA)

Nuon Sophorn	0–2	Boonsak Ponsana	7-21, 6-21
Teav Yongvannak	0–2	Tanongsak Saensomboonsuk	10-21, 12-21
Prum Saravuth	0–2	Pakkawat Vilailak	8-21, 5-21
Nuon Sophorn / Vann Chanpisey		Patiphat Chalardchaleam / Nuttaphon Narkthong	Not Played
Prum Saravuth / Teav Yongvannak		Bodin Isara / Maneepong Jongjit	Not Played

11 December	Laos (LAO)	0–3	Indonesia (INA)

Phakornkham Fongmalayseng	0–2	Sony Dwi Kuncoro	11-21, 8-21
Yothin Latsavong / Chanda Vanvilay	0–2	Markis Kido / Hendra Setiawan	8-21, 15-21
Sathien Mouanevongsa	0–2	Simon Santoso	5-21, 14-21
Sihalath Anousone / Lomany Mouksavanh		Mohammad Ahsan / Bona Septano	Not Played
Phonepasith Phengsengcham		Tommy Sugiarto	Not Played

=== Semi-final ===
12 December	Malaysia (MAS)	3–0	Singapore (SIN)

Muhammad Hafiz Hashim	2–0	Derek Wong	21-15, 21-15
Koo Kien Keat / Tan Boon Heong	2–0	Hendri Saputra / Hendra Wijaya	21-19, 1-0 (r)
Kuan Beng Hong	2–0	Ashton Chen Yong Zhao	21-17, 21-17
Mohd Fairuzizuan Mohd Tazari / Mohd Zakry Abdul Latif		Terry Yeo / Jonathan Tang	Not Played
Liew Daren		Ronald Susilo	Not Played

11 December	Thailand (THA)	0–3	Indonesia (INA)

Boonsak Ponsana	1–2	Sony Dwi Kuncoro	6-21, 21-11, 14-21
Patiphat Chalardchaleam / Nuttaphon Narkthong	0–2	Markis Kido / Hendra Setiawan	12-21, 12-21
Tanongsak Saensomboonsuk	1–2	Simon Santoso	21-10, 15-21, 17-21
Sudket Prapakamol / Songphon Anugritayawon		Mohammad Ahsan / Bona Septano	Not Played
Pakkawat Vilailak		Tommy Sugiarto	Not Played

=== Final ===
13 December	Malaysia (MAS)	1–3	Indonesia (INA)

Muhammad Hafiz Hashim	1–2	Sony Dwi Kuncoro	20-22, 21-14, 12-21
Koo Kien Keat / Tan Boon Heong	2–1	Markis Kido / Hendra Setiawan	19-21, 22-20, 21-10
Kuan Beng Hong	0–2	Simon Santoso	18-21, 13-21
Mohd Fairuzizuan Mohd Tazari / Mohd Zakry Abdul Latif	0–2	Mohammad Ahsan / Nova Widianto	18-21, 17-21
Liew Daren		Tommy Sugiarto	Not Played

== Women's team ==
Quarter-finals
Malaysia
Bye
Thailand
Bye
11 December
Laos	0
Singapore	3
Bye
Indonesia

Semi-finals
12 December
Malaysia	3
Thailand	0
12 December
Singapore	0
Indonesia	3

Final
13 December
Malaysia	3
Indonesia	1

=== Quarter-final ===
11 December	Laos (LAO)	0–3	Singapore (SIN)

Souchai Xaysana	0–2	Zhang Beiwen	5-21, 11-21
Manivone Meungchaleun	0–2	Xing Aiying	9-21, 5-21
Ounalom Phonesay	0–2	Fu Mingtian	2-21, 4-21
Bouphakesone Lomany / Phonephan Vatthanavong		Frances Liu / Vanessa Neo	Not Played
Khonesanith Inthavanh / Boutdalacak		Fu Mingtian / Yao Lei	Not Played

=== Semi-final ===
12 December	Malaysia (MAS)	3–0	Thailand (THA)

Wong Mew Choo	2–0	Salakjit Ponsana	21-15, 21-17
Chin Eei Hui / Wong Pei Tty	2–1	Duanganong Aroonkesorn / Kunchala Voravichitchaikul	19-21, 21-14, 21-14
Lydia Cheah Li Ya	2–1	Porntip Buranaprasertsuk	19-21, 21-18, 21-19
Ng Hui Lin / Woon Khe Wei		Sapsiree Taerattanachai / Saralee Thungthongkam	Not Played
Sannatasah Saniru		Ratchanok Intanon	Not Played

12 December	Singapore (SIN)	0–3	Indonesia (INA)

Zhang Beiwen	0–2	Adriyanti Firdasari	14-21, 13-21
Vanessa Neo / Shinta Mulia Sari	1–2	Nitya Krishinda Maheswari / Greysia Polii	21-23, 21-18, 10-21
Xing Aiying	0–2	Maria Kristin Yulianti	19-21, 15-21
Li Yujia / Yao Lei		Shendy Puspa Irawati / Meiliana Jauhari	Not Played
Fu Mingtian		Lindaweni Fanetri	Not Played

=== Final ===
13 December	Malaysia (MAS)	3–1	Indonesia (INA)

Wong Mew Choo	2–0	Adriyanti Firdasari	21-18, 21-17
Chin Eei Hui / Wong Pei Tty	2–0	Shendy Puspa Irawati / Meiliana Jauhari	21-17, 21-13
Lydia Cheah Li Ya	0–2	Maria Kristin Yulianti	8-21, 9-21
Ng Hui Lin / Woon Khe Wei	2–1	Liliyana Natsir / Greysia Polii	19-21, 21-12, 21-18
Sannatasah Saniru		Lindaweni Fanetri	Not Played

Preceded by 2007	Badminton at the SEA Games; 2009 SEA Games	Succeeded by 2011
