= 2003 Asian Badminton Championships =

Badminton championships

Asian Badminton Championships
- 2003

Tournament information
- Location: Jakarta, Indonesia
- Dates: October 15–October 19
- Venue: Tennis Indoor Gelora Bung Karno

The 2003 Badminton Asia Championships was the 22nd tournament of the Badminton Asia Championships. It was held at the Tennis Indoor Gelora Bung Karno in Jakarta, Indonesia.

== Medalists ==
Event	Gold	Silver	Bronze
Men's singles	(Indonesia) Sony Dwi Kuncoro	(Indonesia) Taufik Hidayat	(Hong Kong) Agus Hariyanto
Men's singles	(Indonesia) Sony Dwi Kuncoro	(Indonesia) Taufik Hidayat	(Hong Kong) Ng Wei
Women's singles	(Hong Kong) Wang Chen	(Indonesia) Silvi Antarini	(China) Dai Yun
Women's singles	(Hong Kong) Wang Chen	(Indonesia) Silvi Antarini	(Hong Kong) Ling Wan Ting
Men's doubles	(South Korea) Lee Dong-soo (South Korea) Yoo Yong-sung	(Indonesia) Markis Kido (Indonesia) Hendra Setiawan	(Indonesia) Flandy Limpele (Indonesia) Eng Hian
Men's doubles	(South Korea) Lee Dong-soo (South Korea) Yoo Yong-sung	(Indonesia) Markis Kido (Indonesia) Hendra Setiawan	(Indonesia) Luluk Hadiyanto (Indonesia) Alvent Yulianto
Women's doubles	(South Korea) Ra Kyung-min (South Korea) Lee Kyung-won	(South Korea) Hwang Yu-mi (South Korea) Lee Hyo-jung	(Japan) Tomomi Matsuda (Japan) Aki Akao
Women's doubles	(South Korea) Ra Kyung-min (South Korea) Lee Kyung-won	(South Korea) Hwang Yu-mi (South Korea) Lee Hyo-jung	(Indonesia) Jo Novita (Indonesia) Lita Nurlita
Mixed doubles	(Indonesia) Nova Widianto (Indonesia) Vita Marissa	(Indonesia) Anggun Nugroho (Indonesia) Eny Widiowati	(South Korea) Kim Yong-hyun (South Korea) Lee Hyo-jung
Mixed doubles	(Indonesia) Nova Widianto (Indonesia) Vita Marissa	(Indonesia) Anggun Nugroho (Indonesia) Eny Widiowati	(Hong Kong) Liu Kwok Wa (Hong Kong) Louisa Koon Wai Chee

== Medal table ==
Rank	Nation	Gold	Silver	Bronze	Total
1	Indonesia (INA)	2	4	3	9
2	South Korea (KOR)	2	1	1	4
3	Hong Kong (HKG)	1	0	4	5
4	China (CHN)	0	0	1	1
4	Japan (JPN)	0	0	1	1
Totals (5 entries)		5	5	10	20

=== Finals ===
Category	Winners	Runners-up	Score
Men's singles	(Indonesia) Sony Dwi Kuncoro	(Indonesia) Taufik Hidayat	15-5, 7-15, 15-8
Women's singles	(Hong Kong) Wang Chen	(Indonesia) Silvi Antarini	11-6, 11-5
Men's doubles	(South Korea) Lee Dong-soo (South Korea) Yoo Yong-sung	(Indonesia) Markis Kido (Indonesia) Hendra Setiawan	15-10, 15-11
Women's doubles	(South Korea) Ra Kyung-min (South Korea) Lee Kyung-won	(South Korea) Hwang Yu-mi (South Korea) Lee Hyo-jung	15-9, 15-7
Mixed doubles	(Indonesia) Nova Widianto (Indonesia) Vita Marissa	(Indonesia) Anggun Nugroho (Indonesia) Eny Widiowati	15-2, 15-11

=== Semi-finals ===
Category	Winner	Runner-up	Score
Men's singles	(Indonesia) Sony Dwi Kuncoro	(Hong Kong) Agus Hariyanto	15–7, 15–4
Men's singles	(Indonesia) Taufik Hidayat	(Hong Kong) Ng Wei	15–5, 15–5
Women's singles	(Hong Kong) Wang Chen	(China) Dai Yun	11–1, 2–11, 11–9
Women's singles	(Indonesia) Silvi Antarini	(Hong Kong) Ling Wan Ting	11–9, 11–1
Men's doubles	(South Korea) Lee Dong-soo (South Korea) Yoo Yong-sung	(Indonesia) Alvent Yulianto (Indonesia) Luluk Hadiyanto	15–7, 15–4
Men's doubles	(Indonesia) Hendra Setiawan (Indonesia) Markis Kido	(Indonesia) Flandy Limpele (Indonesia) Eng Hian	15–13, 11–15, 15–7
Women's doubles	(South Korea) Lee Kyung-won (South Korea) Ra Kyung-min	(Japan) Aki Akao (Japan) Tomomi Matsuda	15–7, 15–3
Women's doubles	(South Korea) Hwang Yu-mi (South Korea) Lee Hyo-jung	(Indonesia) Lita Nurlita (Indonesia) Jo Novita	15–3, 15–8
Mixed doubles	(Indonesia) Nova Widianto (Indonesia) Vita Marissa	(Hong Kong) Liu Kwok Wa (Hong Kong) Koon Wai Chee	15–6, 7–15, 15–5
Mixed doubles	(Indonesia) Anggun Nugroho (Indonesia) Eny Widiowati	(South Korea) Kim Yong-hyun (South Korea) Lee Hyo-jung	15–13, 15–8
