= Anggun Nugroho =

Indonesian badminton player (born 1982)

Personal information
- Born: 28 August 1982 (age 44) Banyumas, Central Java, Indonesia
- Height: 1.73 m (5 ft 8 in)
- Weight: 63 kg (139 lb)

Sport
- Country: Indonesia
- Sport: Badminton
- Handedness: Right
- Coached by: Richard Mainaky
- Event: Mixed doubles

Mixed doubles
- BWF profile
Medal record
Men's badminton
Representing Indonesia
Asian Championships
Silver medal – second place	2003 Jakarta	Mixed doubles
Southeast Asian Games
Gold medal – first place	2003 Ho Chi Minh	Men's team
Silver medal – second place	2005 Manila	Mixed doubles
Silver medal – second place	2005 Manila	Men's team
Silver medal – second place	2003 Ho Chi Minh	Mixed doubles
World Junior Championships
Bronze medal – third place	2000 Guangzhou	Mixed team
Asian Junior Championships
Silver medal – second place	2000 Kyoto	Boys' team

Anggun Nugroho (born 28 August 1982) is an Indonesian badminton player. Nugroho competed in badminton at the 2004 Summer Olympics in mixed doubles with partner Eny Widiowati. He now works as Indonesian national badminton coach.

== Achievements ==
=== Asian Championships ===
Mixed doubles
Year	Venue	Partner	Opponent	Score	Result
2003	Tennis Indoor Gelora Bung Karno; Jakarta, Indonesia	(Indonesia) Eny Widiowati	(Indonesia) Nova Widianto (Indonesia) Vita Marissa	2–15, 11–15	Silver

=== Southeast Asian Games ===
Mixed doubles
Year	Venue	Partner	Opponent	Score	Result
2003	Tan Binh Sport Center; Ho Chi Minh City, Vietnam	(Indonesia) Eny Widiowati	(Thailand) Sudket Prapakamol (Thailand) Saralee Thungthongkam	12–15, 7–15	Silver
2005	PhilSports Arena; Metro Manila, Philippines	(Indonesia) Yunita Tetty	(Indonesia) Nova Widianto (Indonesia) Liliyana Natsir	6–15, 2–15	Silver

=== BWF Grand Prix ===
The BWF Grand Prix has two levels, the Grand Prix and Grand Prix Gold. It is a series of badminton tournaments sanctioned by the Badminton World Federation (BWF) since 2007. The World Badminton Grand Prix sanctioned by International Badminton Federation (IBF) since 1983.

Mixed doubles
Year	Tournament	Partner	Opponent	Score	Result
2007	New Zealand Open	(Indonesia) Nitya Krishinda Maheswari	(Indonesia) Devin Lahardi Fitriawan (Indonesia) Lita Nurlita	16–21, 15–21	(silver) Runner-up
2005	Indonesia Open	(Indonesia) Yunita Tetty	(Indonesia) Nova Widianto (Indonesia) Liliyana Natsir	13–15, 1–15	(silver) Runner-up
2002	German Open	(Indonesia) Eny Widiowati	(Denmark) Jonas Rasmussen (Denmark) Rikke Olsen	0–11, 6–11	(silver) Runner-up

BWF Grand Prix Gold tournament
BWF Grand Prix tournament

=== IBF International ===
Mixed doubles
Year	Tournament	Partner	Opponent	Score	Result
2002	Singapore Satellite	(Indonesia) Monica Permadi	(Indonesia) Robby Istanta (Indonesia) Yunita Tetty	15–4, 15–5	(gold) Winner
