= Sutheaswari Mudukasan =

Malaysian badminton player (born 1985)

Personal information
- Born: 1985 (age 40–41)

Sport
- Country: Malaysia
- Sport: Badminton
- Event: Women's singles

Women's singles
- BWF profile
Medal record
Women's badminton
Representing Malaysia
Southeast Asian Games
Bronze medal – third place	2005 Manila	Women's team

Sutheaswari Mudukasan (born ca 1985) is a badminton player from Malaysia. She was part of the national women's team that won the bronze medal at the 2005 Southeast Asian Games. She played at the 2005 World Badminton Championships in the women's singles event, survived the first round before losing to Li Li of Singapore in the second round.
