= Alvent Yulianto =

Indonesian badminton player (born 1980)

Personal information
- Born: Alvent Yulianto Chandra; 11 July 1980 (age 46) Banyuwangi, East Java, Indonesia
- Height: 1.76 m (5 ft 9 in)
- Weight: 71 kg (157 lb; 11.2 st)

Sport
- Country: Indonesia
- Sport: Badminton
- Handedness: Right

Men's doubles
- Highest ranking: 1 (MD with Luluk Hadiyanto)
- BWF profile
Medal record
Men's badminton
Representing Indonesia
World Championships
Bronze medal – third place	2005 Anaheim	Men's doubles
World Senior Championships
Gold medal – first place	2023 Jeonju	Men's doubles 35+
Sudirman Cup
Silver medal – second place	2005 Beijing	Mixed team
Silver medal – second place	2007 Glasgow	Mixed team
Bronze medal – third place	2003 Eindhoven	Mixed team
Bronze medal – third place	2011 Qingdao	Mixed team
Thomas Cup
Silver medal – second place	2010 Kuala Lumpur	Men's team
Bronze medal – third place	2004 Jakarta	Men's team
Bronze medal – third place	2006 Sendai & Tokyo	Men's team
Asian Games
Silver medal – second place	2006 Doha	Men's doubles
Bronze medal – third place	2006 Doha	Men's team
Bronze medal – third place	2010 Guangzhou	Men's doubles
Bronze medal – third place	2010 Guangzhou	Men's team
Asian Championships
Bronze medal – third place	2001 Manila	Men's doubles
Bronze medal – third place	2003 Jakarta	Men's doubles
Bronze medal – third place	2006 Johor Bahru	Men's doubles
SEA Games
Gold medal – first place	2003 Vietnam	Men's team
Gold medal – first place	2007 Nakhon Ratchasima	Men's team
Silver medal – second place	2005 Manila	Men's doubles
Silver medal – second place	2005 Manila	Men's team
Bronze medal – third place	2003 Vietnam	Men's doubles

Alvent Yulianto Chandra (born 11 July 1980) is an Indonesian badminton player. Born in Glenmore, Banyuwangi, East Java, he has been playing badminton since he was 10 years old in a club named Suryanaga Gudang Garam Surabaya.

== Personal life ==
On 16 October 2021, Yulianto married Freeisy Ester Sompie, also an Indonesian badminton player. Their holy matrimony was held at GMIM Sion Tumaluntung, North Minahasa.

== Career ==
Yulianto is a men's doubles specialist. In 2004, he and partner Luluk Hadiyanto won four top tier tournaments on the international circuit, the Indonesia, Korea, Singapore, and Thailand Opens. They gained a number one world ranking that year despite an early loss in the 2004 Athens Olympics. Since 2004, Hadiyanto and Yulianto have struggled to achieve top form. In 2006, they captured a bronze medal at the Asian Championships in Johor Bahru, Malaysia. Second place finishes in the quadrennial 2006 Asian Games; the 2007 Japan and 2008 Korea Opens have been their highest finishes in major international tournaments, though they won the Indonesian national title in 2007.

After a disappointing 21–19, 14–21, 14–21, first round loss against the Japanese Keita Masuda and Tadashi Ohtsuka at the 2008 Olympics with Luluk Hadiyanto, the couple split partnership. Yulianto then partnered Hendra Aprida Gunawan till 2012. They reached the finals at the 2009 Philippines Open and were also runners-up at the 2011 Malaysia and Thailand Opens. At the 2012 Thomas Cup, Yulianto then played with Mohammad Ahsan defending the Indonesian colors. After this event, he played with Tri Kusumawardana at the 2012 Victor Indonesian International Challenge. Thereafter Yulianto progressed as an independent player for Indonesia with experienced partner Markis Kido winning the Dutch Open and reaching semi-finals at the Macau and 2013 Swiss Open. After a disappointing third round loss at the 2013 BWF World Championships, Yulianto and Kido split up the partnership. Yulianto then started a partnership with Japanese player Shintaro Ikeda, this partnership lasted till the Indonesian Open in June 2014. Thereafter Yulianto partnered his compatriot Yonathan Suryatama Dasuki.

== Participation at Indonesian Team ==
- 4 times at Sudirman Cup (2003, 2005, 2007, 2011)
- 4 times at Thomas Cup (2004, 2006, 2010, 2012)

== Achievements ==
=== World Championships ===
Men's doubles
Year	Venue	Partner	Opponent	Score	Result
2005	Arrowhead Pond, Anaheim, United States	(Indonesia) Luluk Hadiyanto	(United States) Howard Bach (United States) Tony Gunawan	9–15, 13–15	Bronze

=== World Senior Championships ===
Men's doubles

Year	Age	Venue	Partner	Opponent	Score	Result	Ref
2023	35+	Hwasan Indoor Stadium, Jeonju, South Korea	(Indonesia) Fran Kurniawan	(Japan) Yuki Homma (Japan) Masakazu Mouri	21–17, 21–12	Gold	

=== Asian Games ===
Men's doubles
Year	Venue	Partner	Opponent	Score	Result
2006	Aspire Hall 3, Doha, Qatar	(Indonesia) Luluk Hadiyanto	(Malaysia) Koo Kien Keat (Malaysia) Tan Boon Heong	13–21, 14–21	Silver
2010	Tianhe Gymnasium, Guangzhou, China	(Indonesia) Mohammad Ahsan	(Malaysia) Koo Kien Keat (Malaysia) Tan Boon Heong	19–21, 16–21	Bronze

=== Asian Championships ===
Men's doubles
Year	Venue	Partner	Opponent	Score	Result
2001	PhilSports Arena, Manila, Philippines	(Indonesia) Hendra Aprida Gunawan	(Indonesia) Tri Kusharjanto (Indonesia) Bambang Suprianto	4–15, 9–15	Bronze
2003	Tennis Indoor Gelora Bung Karno, Jakarta, Indonesia	(Indonesia) Luluk Hadiyanto	(South Korea) Lee Dong-soo (South Korea) Yoo Yong-sung	7–15, 4–15	Bronze
2006	Bandaraya Stadium, Johor Bahru, Malaysia	(Indonesia) Luluk Hadiyanto	(Malaysia) Choong Tan Fook (Malaysia) Lee Wan Wah	14–21, 21–18, 15–21	Bronze

=== SEA Games ===
Men's doubles
Year	Venue	Partner	Opponent	Score	Result
2003	Tan Binh Sport Center, Ho Chi Minh City, Vietnam	(Indonesia) Luluk Hadiyanto	(Malaysia) Chew Choon Eng (Malaysia) Chang Kim Wai	15–11, 13–15, 9–15	Bronze
2005	PhilSports Arena, Pasig, Philippines	(Indonesia) Luluk Hadiyanto	(Indonesia) Markis Kido (Indonesia) Hendra Setiawan	8–15, 15–7, 6–15	Silver

=== BWF Superseries (4 runners-up) ===
The BWF Superseries, which was launched on 14 December 2006 and implemented in 2007, is a series of elite badminton tournaments, sanctioned by the Badminton World Federation (BWF). BWF Superseries levels are Superseries and Superseries Premier. A season of Superseries consists of twelve tournaments around the world that have been introduced since 2011. Successful players are invited to the Superseries Finals, which are held at the end of each year.

Men's doubles
Year	Tournament	Partner	Opponent	Score	Result
2007	Japan Open	(Indonesia) Luluk Hadiyanto	(United States) Tony Gunawan (Indonesia) Candra Wijaya	18–21, 17–21	(silver) Runner-up
2008	Korea Open	(Indonesia) Luluk Hadiyanto	(China) Cai Yun (China) Fu Haifeng	7–21, 22–20, 17–21	(silver) Runner-up
2009	Malaysia Open	(Indonesia) Hendra Aprida Gunawan	(South Korea) Jung Jae-sung (South Korea) Lee Yong-dae	21–18, 14–21, 14–21	(silver) Runner-up
2011	Singapore Open	(Indonesia) Hendra Aprida Gunawan	(China) Cai Yun (China) Fu Haifeng	17–21, 13–21	(silver) Runner-up

BWF Super Series Finals tournament
BWF Super Series Premier tournament
BWF Super Series tournament

=== BWF Grand Prix (5 titles, 7 runners-up) ===
The BWF Grand Prix had two levels, the BWF Grand Prix and Grand Prix Gold. It was a series of badminton tournaments sanctioned by the Badminton World Federation (BWF) which was held from 2007 to 2017. The World Badminton Grand Prix sanctioned by International Badminton Federation (IBF) from 1983 to 2006.

Men's doubles
Year	Tournament	Partner	Opponent	Score	Result
2004	Thailand Open	(Indonesia) Luluk Hadiyanto	(England) Anthony Clark (England) Nathan Robertson	15–12, 15–6	(gold) Winner
2004	Swiss Open	(Indonesia) Luluk Hadiyanto	(China) Cai Yun (China) Fu Haifeng	9–15, 14–17	(silver) Runner-up
2004	Korea Open	(Indonesia) Luluk Hadiyanto	(China) Sang Yang (China) Zheng Bo	15–12, 15–12	(gold) Winner
2004	Malaysia Open	(Indonesia) Luluk Hadiyanto	(Malaysia) Choong Tan Fook (Malaysia) Lee Wan Wah	12–15, 7–15	(silver) Runner-up
2004	Singapore Open	(Indonesia) Luluk Hadiyanto	(Denmark) Jens Eriksen (Denmark) Martin Lundgaard Hansen	15–2, 15–9	(gold) Winner
2004	Indonesia Open	(Indonesia) Luluk Hadiyanto	(China) Cai Yun (China) Fu Haifeng	15–8, 15–11	(gold) Winner
2009	Philippines Open	(Indonesia) Hendra Aprida Gunawan	(Indonesia) Mohammad Ahsan (Indonesia) Bona Septano	21–10, 14–21, 17–21	(silver) Runner-up
2010	Malaysia Grand Prix Gold	(Indonesia) Hendra Aprida Gunawan	(Indonesia) Markis Kido (Indonesia) Hendra Setiawan	21–8, 17–21, 12–21	(silver) Runner-up
2010	Macau Open	(Indonesia) Hendra Aprida Gunawan	(South Korea) Ko Sung-hyun (South Korea) Yoo Yeon-seong	17–21, 15–21	(silver) Runner-up
2011	Malaysia Grand Prix Gold	(Indonesia) Hendra Aprida Gunawan	(Malaysia) Koo Kien Keat (Malaysia) Tan Boon Heong	16–21, 7–21	(silver) Runner-up
2011	Thailand Open	(Indonesia) Hendra Aprida Gunawan	(South Korea) Jung Jae-sung (South Korea) Lee Yong-dae	22–24, 14–21	(silver) Runner-up
2012	Dutch Open	(Indonesia) Markis Kido	(Malaysia) Gan Teik Chai (Malaysia) Ong Soon Hock	18–21, 21–13, 21–14	(gold) Winner

BWF Grand Prix Gold tournament
BWF Grand Prix tournament

=== BWF International Challenge/Series (1 title, 1 runner-up) ===
Men's doubles
Year	Tournament	Partner	Opponent	Score	Result
2009	Indonesia International	(Indonesia) Hendra Aprida Gunawan	(Indonesia) Angga Pratama (Indonesia) Rian Agung Saputra	21–17, 21–12	(gold) Winner

Mixed doubles
Year	Tournament	Partner	Opponent	Score	Result
2001	Indonesia International	(Indonesia) Yunita Tetty	(Indonesia) Hendra Aprida Gunawan (Indonesia) Lita Nurlita	11–15, 14–17	(silver) Runner-up

BWF International Challenge tournament
BWF International Series tournament

== Performance timeline ==
=== National team ===
- Senior level

Team event	2003	2005	2007
Southeast Asian Games	Gold	Silver	Gold

Team event	2006	2010
Asian Games	Bronze	Bronze

Team event	2004	2006	2010
Thomas Cup	Bronze	Bronze	Silver

Team event	2003	2005	2007	2011
Sudirman Cup	Bronze	Silver	Silver	Bronze

=== Individual competitions ===
- Senior level

Event	2003	2005
Southeast Asian Games	Bronze	Silver

Event	2001	2003	2006
Asian Championships	Bronze	Bronze	Bronze

Event	2006	2010
Asian Games	Silver	Bronze

Event	2010	2011	2013
World Championships	R2	R3	R3

Tournament	2004	2005	2006	2007	2008	2009	2010	2011	2012	2013	2014	Best
Tournament	IBF Grand Prix			BWF Superseries								Best
Swiss Open						R2	R1	GPG				F (2004)
Malaysia Open	F				R1	F	SF	QF	R2	R2	A	F (2004, 2009)
Singapore Open	W					A	R2	F	A	R2	A	W (2004)
Indonesia Open	W		SF		R2	QF	A	R1	A	QF	R1	W (2004)
Korea Open	W				F	R2	QF	R2	R2	R1	R1	W (2004)
Japan Open				F	A	SF	R2	QF	R2	A	R2	F (2007)
BWF Superseries Finals	—N/a				DNQ	GS	DNQ					GS (2009)

Tournament	2004	2005	2006	2007	2008	2009	2010	2011	2012	2013	Best
Tournament	IBF Grand Prix			BWF Grand Prix and Grand Prix Gold							Best
Philippines Open	—N/a				—N/a	F	—N/a				F (2009)
Malaysia Masters	—N/a					SF	F	F	A	SF (MD); R1 (XD)	F (2010, 2011)
Swiss Open	F			SS				SF	SF	SF	F (2004)
Thailand Open	W						—N/a	F	A	QF (MD); R1 (XD)	W (2004)
Dutch Open	A					A			W (MD); R1 (XD)	A	W (2012)
Macau Open	—N/a		A			R2	F		SF	QF	F (2010)
