= Vietnamese National Badminton Championships =

The Vietnamese National Badminton Championships is a tournament organized by the Vietnam Badminton Federation to crown the best badminton players in Vietnam.

== Past winners ==
Year	Men's singles	Women's singles	Men's doubles	Women's doubles	Mixed doubles
1964	Âu Đức Minh	No competition	Âu Tâm Đệ; Nguyễn Không Phước	No competition	
1965	Âu Đức Minh	No competition	Âu Tâm Đệ; Lâm Trình	No competition	
1966	Huỳnh Tấn Tài	No competition	Âu Tâm Đệ; Thái Luân Hiền	No competition	
1967	Huỳnh Tấn Tài	No competition	Âu Tâm Đệ; Âu Đức Minh	No competition	
2001	Nguyễn Phú Cường				
2002	Nguyễn Tiến Minh				
2004	Nguyễn Tiến Minh				
2005	Nguyễn Tiến Minh				
2006	Nguyễn Tiến Minh	Nguyễn Thị Bình Thơ	Trần Thanh Hải; Nguyễn Tiến Minh	Lê Thị Thanh Thúy; Thái Thị Hồng Gấm	Nguyễn Hoàng Long; Ngô Hải Vân
2007	Nguyễn Tiến Minh	Nguyễn Thị Bình Thơ	Nguyễn Tiến Minh; Nguyễn Quang Minh	Lê Thị Thanh Thúy; Trần Thị Thanh Thảo	Huỳnh Nguyễn Khang; Trần Thị Thanh Thảo
2008	Nguyễn Tiến Minh	Nguyễn Thị Bình Thơ	Huỳnh Nguyễn Khang; Nguyễn Hoàng Nam	Nguyễn Thị Sen; Vũ Thị Trang	Dương Bảo Đức; Thái Thị Hồng Gấm
2009	Nguyễn Tiến Minh	Nguyễn Thị Bình Thơ	Đào Mạnh Thắng; Bùi Bằng Đức	Lê Ngọc Nguyên Nhung; Thái Thị Hồng Gấm	Dương Bảo Đức; Thái Thị Hồng Gấm
2011	Nguyễn Tiến Minh	Vũ Thị Trang	Dương Bảo Đức; Nguyễn Hoàng Nam	Nguyễn Thị Sen; Vũ Thị Trang	Dương Bảo Đức; Thái Thị Hồng Gấm
2012					
2013	Nguyễn Tiến Minh	Vũ Thị Trang	Nguyễn Hoàng Nam; Dương Bảo Đức	Nguyễn Thị Sen; Vũ Thị Trang	Dương Bảo Đức; Thái Thị Hồng Gấm
2015	Phạm Cao Cường	Vũ Thị Trang	Dương Bảo Đức; Bảo Minh	Nguyễn Thị Sen; Vũ Thị Trang	Đỗ Tuấn Đức; Phạm Như Thảo
2016	Phạm Cao Cường	Vũ Thị Trang	Lê Hà Anh; Đào Mạnh Thắng	Nguyễn Thị Sen; Vũ Thị Trang	Đỗ Tuấn Đức; Phạm Như Thảo
2017	Nguyễn Tiến Minh	Vũ Thị Trang	Đỗ Tuấn Đức; Phạm Hồng Nam	Nguyễn Thị Sen; Vũ Thị Trang	Đỗ Tuấn Đức; Phạm Như Thảo
2019	Nguyễn Tiến Minh	Nguyễn Thùy Linh	Đỗ Tuấn Đức; Phạm Hồng Nam	Phạm Thị Khánh; Đinh Thị Phương Hồng	Đỗ Tuấn Đức; Phạm Như Thảo
