= Poompat Sapkulchananart =

Thai badminton player (born 1983)

Personal information
- Born: 18 October 1983 (age 42)
- Height: 1.73 m (5 ft 8 in)

Sport
- Country: Thailand
- Sport: Badminton
- Handedness: Right

Men's singles
- Current ranking: 73 (25 October 2007)
- BWF profile
Medal record
Men's badminton
Representing Thailand
Southeast Asian Games
Bronze medal – third place	2007 Nakhon Ratchasima	Men's team
Bronze medal – third place	2005 Manila	Men's team
Summer Universiade
Gold medal – first place	2007 Bangkok	Mixed team
Bronze medal – third place	2007 Bangkok	Men's singles

Poompat Sapkulchananart (Thai: ภูมิพัฒน์ ทรัพย์กุลชนนาถ; born 18 October 1983) is a badminton player from Thailand. He was the national championships in 2006, and in the same year, he represented his country at the Asian Games. In 2007, he won the Smiling Fish Asian Satellite in the men's singles event. He also help the Thai team to win gold at the 2007 Summer Universiade, and at the individual event, he won the men's singles bronze.
