= Norshahliza Baharum =

Malaysian badminton player (born 1987)

Personal information
- Born: 3 March 1987 (age 39)

Sport
- Country: Malaysia
- Sport: Badminton
- Event: Women's singles & doubles

Women's singles & doubles
- BWF profile
Medal record
Women's badminton
Representing Malaysia
Southeast Asian Games
Bronze medal – third place	2005 Manila	Women's team
Asian Junior Championships
Silver medal – second place	2005 Jakarta	Girls' team

Norshahliza Baharum (born 3 March 1987) is a Malaysian badminton player. Baharum was selected to join the 2004 Uber Cup squad, and the team qualified on merit to the final stage for the first time. The Bukit Jalil Sports School alumni, was the girls' singles champion at the 2004 Asean School Championships, and part of the Malaysia junior team that won the silver medal at the 2005 Asian Junior Championships in the girls' team event after being defeated by the Chinese team in the final. Baharum competed at the 2006 Asian Games in Doha, Qatar. She won the women's doubles title at the 2008 Iran Fajr International tournament with Lim Yin Loo.

== Achievements ==
=== BWF International Challenge/Series ===
Women's doubles
Year	Tournament	Partner	Opponent	Score	Result
2008	Iran Fajr International	(Malaysia) Lim Yin Loo	(Sri Lanka) Renu Chandrika Hettiarachchige (Sri Lanka) Thilini Jayasinghe	21–12, 21–15	(gold) Winner

Mixed doubles
Year	Tournament	Partner	Opponent	Score	Result
2006	Vietnam Satellite	(Malaysia) Mohd Razif Abdul Latif	(Thailand) Songphon Anugritayawon (Thailand) Kunchala Voravichitchaikul	13–21, 10–21	(silver) Runner-up

BWF International Challenge tournament
BWF International Series tournament
