= Kuan Beng Hong =

Malaysian badminton player (born 1983)

Kuan Beng Hong 关明鸿
Personal information
- Born: 9 January 1983 (age 43) Kedah, Malaysia
- Years active: 2000-2015

Sport
- Country: Malaysia
- Sport: Badminton
- Handedness: Right

Men's singles
- Career record: 186 wins, 119 losses
- BWF profile
Medal record
Men's badminton
Representing Malaysia
Sudirman Cup
Bronze medal – third place	2009 Guangzhou	Mixed team
Thomas Cup
Bronze medal – third place	2006 Sendai/Tokyo	Men's team
Asian Games
Bronze medal – third place	2006 Doha	Men's team
Asian Championships
Silver medal – second place	2005 Hyderabad	Men's singles
Southeast Asian Games
Gold medal – first place	2005 Manila	Men's team
Bronze medal – third place	2007 Nakhon Ratchasima	Men's team
Silver medal – second place	2009 Vientiane	Men's team

Kuan Beng Hong (born 9 February 1983) is a former badminton player from Malaysia.

== Achievements ==
=== Asian Championships ===
Men's singles
Year	Venue	Opponent	Score	Result
2005	Gachibowli Indoor Stadium; Hyderabad, India	(Indonesia) Sony Dwi Kuncoro	10–15, 5–15	Silver

=== IBF World Grand Prix ===
The World Badminton Grand Prix sanctioned by International Badminton Federation (IBF) from 1983 to 2006.

Men's singles
Year	Tournament	Opponent	Score	Result
2004	Chinese Taipei Open	(Malaysia) Lee Chong Wei	4–15, 10–15	(silver) Runner-up
