= Yunita Tetty =

Indonesian badminton player

Personal information
- Born: 10 December 1981 (age 44)
- Height: 1.59 m (5 ft 3 in)

Sport
- Country: Indonesia
- Sport: Badminton
- Event: Women's & mixed doubles

Women's & mixed doubles
- BWF profile
Medal record
Women's badminton
Representing Indonesia
Sudirman Cup
Silver medal – second place	2005 Beijing	Mixed team
Southeast Asian Games
Silver medal – second place	2005 Manila	Mixed doubles
Bronze medal – third place	2005 Manila	Women's team

Yunita Tetty (born 10 December 1981) is an Indonesian former badminton player affiliated with Suryanaga Surabaya club. She was the mixed doubles silver medalists at the 2005 Southeast Asian Games.

== Achievements ==
=== Southeast Asian Games ===
Mixed doubles
Year	Venue	Partner	Opponent	Score	Result
2005	PhilSports Arena, Metro Manila, Philippines	(Indonesia) Anggun Nugroho	(Indonesia) Nova Widianto (Indonesia) Liliyana Natsir	6–15, 2–15	Silver

=== IBF World Grand Prix ===
The World Badminton Grand Prix was sanctioned by the International Badminton Federation from 1983 to 2006.

Mixed doubles
Year	Tournament	Partner	Opponent	Score	Result
2005	Indonesia Open	(Indonesia) Anggun Nugroho	(Indonesia) Nova Widianto (Indonesia) Liliyana Natsir	13–15, 1–15	(silver) Runner-up

=== BWF International Challenge/Series ===
Women's doubles
Year	Tournament	Partner	Opponent	Score	Result
2001	Indonesia International	(Indonesia) Ninna Ernita	(Malaysia) Norhasikin Amin (Malaysia) Wong Pei Tty	15–8, 15–1	(gold) Winner

Mixed doubles
Year	Tournament	Partner	Opponent	Score	Result
2001	Indonesia International	(Indonesia) Alvent Yulianto	(Indonesia) Hendra Aprida Gunawan (Indonesia) Lita Nurlita	11–15, 14–17	(silver) Runner-up
2002	Singapore Satellite	(Indonesia) Robby Istanta	(Indonesia) Anggun Nugroho (Indonesia) Monica Permadi	4–15, 5–15	(silver) Runner-up
2002	Malaysia Satellite	(Indonesia) Robby Istanta	(South Korea) Ha Tae-kwon (South Korea) Lee Kyung-won	6–11, 0–11	(silver) Runner-up
2007	Vietnam International	(Indonesia) Tri Kusharjanto	(Indonesia) Tontowi Ahmad (Indonesia) Yulianti	21–15, 21–17	(gold) Winner

BWF International Challenge tournament
BWF International Series tournament
