= Nguyễn Quang Minh =

Vietnamese badminton player (born 1982)

Personal information
- Born: 16 December 1982 (age 43)
- Height: 1.69 m (5 ft 7 in)
- Weight: 62 kg (137 lb)

Sport
- Country: Vietnam; United States
- Sport: Badminton

Men's singles & doubles
- Highest ranking: 100 (MS), 56 (MD) (2006)
- BWF profile
Medal record
Men's badminton
Representing Vietnam
Southeast Asian Games
Bronze medal – third place	2005 Manila	Men's team

Nguyễn Quang Minh (born 16 December 1982) is a former Vietnamese badminton player who later played for the United States. He was part of the national team that won the bronze medal at the 2005 Southeast Asian Games. He reached a career high of world number 100 in the men's singles and number 57 in the men's doubles partnered with Trần Thanh Hải. He represented his country at the 2006 Asian Games. Played for the Ho Chi Minh City team, he won the men's doubles title at the 2007 Vietnamese National Championships with Nguyễn Tiến Minh.

Nguyễn left the national team in 2008, and immigrated to the United States. In the US, he won the Dave Freeman Open in 2010 and 2011, also at the Boston Open in 2010, 2011 and 2012.
