= Lyddia Cheah =

Malaysian badminton player

Lyddia Cheah Yi Yu 谢沂逾
Personal information
- Born: Lyddia Cheah Li Ya 謝麗雅; 8 September 1989 (age 37) Kuala Lumpur, Malaysia
- Height: 1.77 m (5 ft 10 in)
- Weight: 65 kg (143 lb)

Sport
- Country: Malaysia
- Sport: Badminton
- Handedness: Right

Women's singles & doubles
- Highest ranking: 29 (WS 29 October 2009); 184 (WD 25 January 2018); 413 (XD 27 August 2015)
- BWF profile
Medal record
Women's badminton
Representing Malaysia
Commonwealth Games
| Gold medal – first place | 2010 New Delhi | Mixed team |
Southeast Asian Games
| Gold medal – first place | 2009 Vientiane | Women's team |
| Bronze medal – third place | 2007 Nakhon Ratchasima | Women's team |
| Bronze medal – third place | 2009 Vientiane | Women's singles |
| Bronze medal – third place | 2011 Jakarta–Palembang | Women's team |
Summer Universiade
| Bronze medal – third place | 2015 Gwangju | Mixed team |
| Bronze medal – third place | 2017 Taipei | Mixed team |
World Junior Championships
| Bronze medal – third place | 2006 Incheon | Mixed team |
Commonwealth Youth Games
| Gold medal – first place | 2004 Bendigo | Mixed team |
Asia Junior Championships
| Gold medal – first place | 2007 Kuala Lumpur | Mixed team |
| Silver medal – second place | 2005 Jakarta | Girls' team |
| Silver medal – second place | 2006 Kuala Lumpur | Girls' singles |
| Silver medal – second place | 2006 Kuala Lumpur | Mixed team |
| Silver medal – second place | 2007 Kuala Lumpur | Girls' doubles |
| Bronze medal – third place | 2007 Kuala Lumpur | Girls' singles |

Lyddia Cheah Li Ya (simplified Chinese: 谢沂逾; traditional Chinese: 謝沂逾; pinyin: Xiè Yíyú; born 8 September 1989, also known as Lyddia Cheah Yi Yu) is a Malaysian badminton player. Her younger sister, Soniia Cheah Su Ya is also a badminton player. In 2010, she competed at the Commonwealth Games in India.

== Career ==
In 2008, she became the runner-up at the Chinese Taipei Grand Prix Gold tournament. She was defeated by Saina Nehwal of India in the final. In 2009, she won a bronze medal at the Southeast Asian Games in the women's singles event. She was a part of the Malaysian team squad that won team gold at the 2009 Southeast Asian Games in the women's team event and 2010 Commonwealth Games in the mixed team event.

In 2012, she won the Maybank Malaysia International Challenge tournament. She lived up to expectations when she easily overpowered Singaporean seventh seed Liang Xiaoyu. By the end of July 2013 she announced her retirement from the international badminton scene and the National badminton team of Malaysia to pursue her A-level studies. As an independent player she joined the AirAsia Badminton Academy in 2014 and resumed her international career. In August 2015 she signed with team Derby in the United Kingdom to participate in England's National Badminton League. In 2016, she was the runner-up at the Bulgarian International tournament in the women's singles and doubles event. In 2017, she won the Iceland International tournament in the women's doubles event, and became the runner-up in the singles event.

== Achievements ==
=== Southeast Asian Games ===
Women's singles
| Year | Venue | Opponent | Score | Result |
|---|---|---|---|---|
| 2009 | Gym Hall 1, National Sports Complex; Vientiane, Laos | (Thailand) Ratchanok Intanon | 15–21, 21–23 | Bronze |

=== Asian Junior Championships ===
Girls' singles
| Year | Venue | Opponent | Score | Result |
|---|---|---|---|---|
| 2006 | Kuala Lumpur Badminton Stadium; Kuala Lumpur, Malaysia | (China) Wang Yihan | 16–21, 18–21 | Silver |
| 2007 | Stadium Juara, Kuala Lumpur, Malaysia | (Singapore) Gu Juan | 21–16, 14–21, 11–21 | Bronze |

Girls' doubles
| Year | Venue | Partner | Opponent | Score | Result |
|---|---|---|---|---|---|
| 2007 | Stadium Juara; Kuala Lumpur, Malaysia | (Malaysia) Tee Jing Yi | (Indonesia) Richi Puspita Dili (Indonesia) Debby Susanto | 12–21, 21–15, 18–21 | Silver |

=== BWF Grand Prix (1 runner-up) ===
The BWF Grand Prix had two levels, the Grand Prix and Grand Prix Gold. It was a series of badminton tournaments sanctioned by the Badminton World Federation (BWF) and played between 2007 and 2017.

Women's singles
| Year | Tournament | Opponent | Score | Result |
|---|---|---|---|---|
| 2008 | Chinese Taipei Open | (India) Saina Nehwal | 8–21, 19–21 | (silver) Runner-up |

BWF Grand Prix Gold tournament
BWF Grand Prix tournament

=== BWF International Challenge/Series (3 titles, 4 runners-up) ===
Women's singles
| Year | Tournament | Opponent | Score | Result |
|---|---|---|---|---|
| 2005 | Malaysia Satellite | (South Korea) Bae Seung-hee | 4–11, 2–11 | (silver) Runner-up |
| 2008 | Vietnam International | (Chinese Taipei) Hung Shih-han | 22–20, 21–15 | (gold) Winner |
| 2012 | Malaysia International | (Singapore) Liang Xiaoyu | 21–17, 21–12 | (gold) Winner |
| 2016 | Bulgarian International | (England) Panuga Riou | 15–21, 16–21 | (silver) Runner-up |
| 2017 | Iceland International | (Malaysia) Yang Li Lian | 8–21, 11–21 | (silver) Runner-up |

Women's doubles
| Year | Tournament | Partner | Opponent | Score | Result |
|---|---|---|---|---|---|
| 2016 | Bulgarian International | (England) Grace King | (Turkey) Büşra Yalçınkaya (Turkey) Fatma Nur Yavuz | 17–21, 17–21 | (silver) Runner-up |
| 2017 | Iceland International | (Malaysia) Yang Li Lian | (England) Grace King (England) Hope Warner | 21–6, 21–16 | (gold) Winner |

BWF International Challenge tournament
BWF International Series tournament
BWF Future Series tournament
