= Lê Ngọc Nguyên Nhung =

Vietnamese badminton player (born 1984)

Personal information
- Born: 12 February 1984 (age 42) Ho Chi Minh City, Vietnam
- Height: 1.64 m (5 ft 5 in)
- Weight: 55 kg (121 lb)

Sport
- Country: Vietnam
- Sport: Badminton
- Handedness: Right

Women's singles & doubles
- Highest ranking: 66 (WS) (2008)
- BWF profile
Medal record
Women's badminton
Representing Vietnam
Southeast Asian Games
Bronze medal – third place	2001 Kuala Lumpur	Women's team
Bronze medal – third place	2003 Ho Chi Minh City	Women's team

Lê Ngọc Nguyên Nhung (born 12 February 1984) is a Vietnamese badminton player. She joined the Ho Chi Minh City team in 1996, and was a part of the National team at the 2001, 2003, 2005, and 2009 Southeast Asian Games. She was the National Champion in the women's singles event in 2007–2009, and also in the women's doubles event in 2009. In 2008, she competed at the 2008 Olympic Games in Beijing, China, but lost in the first round.

== Achievements ==
=== BWF International Challenge/Series ===
Women's singles
Year	Tournament	Opponent	Score	Result
2007	North Shore City International	(Ukraine) Larisa Griga	19–21, 14–21	(silver) Runner-up
2007	Nouméa International	(Czech Republic) Kristína Ludíková		(silver) Runner-up
2008	Laos International	(Thailand) Ratchanok Intanon	20–22, 21–14, 21–18	(gold) Winner

Women's doubles
Year	Tournament	Partner	Opponent	Score	Result
2007	North Shore City International	(New Zealand) Catherine Moody	(Republic of Ireland) Chloe Magee (Republic of Ireland) Bing Huang	15–21, 21–16, 15–21	(silver) Runner-up
2008	Laos International	(Vietnam) Thái Thị Hồng Gấm	(Indonesia) Annisa Wahyuni (Indonesia) Nimas Rani Wjayanti	21–17, 12–21, 19–21	(silver) Runner-up

BWF International Challenge tournament
BWF International Series tournament
BWF Future Series tournament
