= Badminton at the 2005 SEA Games =

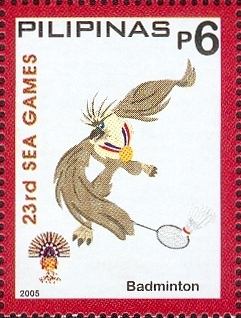
- Logo of badminton at the 2005 Southeast Asian Games on a 2005 stamp of the Philippines
- Venue: PhilSports Arena
- Location: Pasig, Metro Manila
- Date: November 28 – December 3

Badminton at the 2005 SEA Games was held at the PhilSports Arena (formerly ULTRA Arena) at the Philippine Sports Commission Complex in Pasig, Philippines. Participants competed for 5 gold medals in the individual events and 2 gold medals in the team events.

== Medal table ==
* Host nation (Philippines)

Rank	Nation	Gold	Silver	Bronze	Total
1	Indonesia	4	5	1	10
2	Malaysia	2	1	6	9
3	Thailand	1	0	3	4
4	Singapore	0	1	3	4
5	Vietnam	0	0	1	1
Totals (5 entries)		7	7	14	28

== Medalists ==
Event	Gold	Silver	Bronze
Men's singles	Sony Dwi Kuncoro; Indonesia	Simon Santoso; Indonesia	Lee Chong Wei; Malaysia
Men's singles	Sony Dwi Kuncoro; Indonesia	Simon Santoso; Indonesia	Muhd Hafiz Hashim; Malaysia
Women's singles	Adriyanti Firdasari; Indonesia	Wong Mew Choo; Malaysia	Li Li; Singapore
Women's singles	Adriyanti Firdasari; Indonesia	Wong Mew Choo; Malaysia	Salakjit Ponsana; Thailand
Men's doubles	Indonesia; Markis Kido; Hendra Setiawan	Indonesia; Luluk Hadiyanto; Alvent Yulianto	Malaysia; Choong Tan Fook; Wong Choong Hann
Men's doubles	Indonesia; Markis Kido; Hendra Setiawan	Indonesia; Luluk Hadiyanto; Alvent Yulianto	Malaysia; Chan Chong Ming; Koo Kien Keat
Women's doubles	Malaysia; Chin Eei Hui; Wong Pei Tty	Indonesia; Jo Novita; Greysia Polii	Singapore; Jiang Yanmei; Li Yujia
Women's doubles	Malaysia; Chin Eei Hui; Wong Pei Tty	Indonesia; Jo Novita; Greysia Polii	Thailand; Saralee Thungthongkam; Sathinee Chankrachangwong
Mixed doubles	Indonesia; Nova Widianto; Liliyana Natsir	Indonesia; Anggun Nugroho; Yunita Tetty	Singapore; Hendri Saputra; Li Yujia
Mixed doubles	Indonesia; Nova Widianto; Liliyana Natsir	Indonesia; Anggun Nugroho; Yunita Tetty	Malaysia; Koo Kien Keat; Wong Pei Tty
Men's team	Malaysia; Lee Chong Wei; Muhd Hafiz Hashim; Kuan Beng Hong; Choong Tan Fook; Wong Choong Hann; Chan Chong Ming; Koo Kien Keat; Lee Wan Wah	Indonesia; Taufik Hidayat; Sony Dwi Kuncoro; Simon Santoso; Luluk Hadiyanto; Alvent Yulianto; Hendra Setiawan; Markis Kido; Anggun Nugroho; Nova Widianto	Thailand; Boonsak Ponsana; Poompat Sapkulchananart; Jakrapan Thanathiratham; Sudket Prapakamol; Patapol Ngernsrisuk; Nitipong Saengsila; Songphon Anugritayawon
Men's team	Malaysia; Lee Chong Wei; Muhd Hafiz Hashim; Kuan Beng Hong; Choong Tan Fook; Wong Choong Hann; Chan Chong Ming; Koo Kien Keat; Lee Wan Wah	Indonesia; Taufik Hidayat; Sony Dwi Kuncoro; Simon Santoso; Luluk Hadiyanto; Alvent Yulianto; Hendra Setiawan; Markis Kido; Anggun Nugroho; Nova Widianto	Vietnam; Nguyễn Tiến Minh; Nguyễn Hoàng Hải; Nguyễn Quang Phong; Trần Thanh Hải; Nguyễn Quang Minh
Women's team	Thailand; Salakjit Ponsana; Monthila Meemek; Soratja Chansrisukot; Saralee Thungthongkam; Sathinee Chankrachangwong; Kunchala Voravichitchaikul; Sujitra Ekmongkolpaisarn; Sirivannavari Nariratana	Singapore; Li Li; Xing Aiying; Jiang Yanmei; Li Yujia; Frances Liu; Shinta Mulia Sari	Indonesia; Adriyanti Firdasari; Fransisca Ratnasari; Maria Kristin Yulianti; Jo Novita; Greysia Polii; Lita Nurlita; Natalia Poluakan; Yunita Tetty; Liliyana Natsir
Women's team	Thailand; Salakjit Ponsana; Monthila Meemek; Soratja Chansrisukot; Saralee Thungthongkam; Sathinee Chankrachangwong; Kunchala Voravichitchaikul; Sujitra Ekmongkolpaisarn; Sirivannavari Nariratana	Singapore; Li Li; Xing Aiying; Jiang Yanmei; Li Yujia; Frances Liu; Shinta Mulia Sari	Malaysia; Wong Mew Choo; M. Sutheaswari; Julia Wong Pei Xian; Norsyaliza Baharum; Wong Pei Tty; Chin Eei Hui; Mooi Hing Yau; Ooi Sock Ai

== Men's singles ==
1st Round
(Singapore) Kendrick Lee	2	15	13
(Vietnam) Nguyễn Tiến Minh	15	9	15
(Indonesia) Simon Santoso	15	15
(Philippines) Wally Fernandez	7	7
(Vietnam) Nguyễn Quang Minh	6	15	15
(Singapore) Aaron Tan	15	7	9
(Thailand) Poompat Sapkulchananart	15	13	15
(Philippines) Kennevic Asuncion	4	15	4

Quarterfinals
1	(Malaysia) Lee Chong Wei	10	17	15
(Vietnam) Nguyễn Tiến Minh	15	14	8
3/4	(Thailand) Boonsak Ponsana	11	15	4
(Indonesia) Simon Santoso	15	7	15
(Vietnam) Nguyễn Quang Minh	10	4
3/4	(Indonesia) Sony Dwi Kuncoro	15	15
(Thailand) Poompat Sapkulchananart	14	3
2	(Malaysia) Muhd Hafiz Hashim	17	15

Semifinals
1	(Malaysia) Lee Chong Wei	11	9
(Indonesia) Simon Santoso	15	15
3/4	(Indonesia) Sony Dwi Kuncoro	15	15
2	(Malaysia) Muhd Hafiz Hashim	11	1

Finals
(Indonesia) Simon Santoso	16	3
3/4	(Indonesia) Sony Dwi Kuncoro	17	15

== Women's singles ==
1st Round
(Vietnam) Lê Ngọc Nguyên Nhung	3	11	11
(Malaysia) M. Sutheaswari	11	7	5
(Indonesia) Adriyanti Firdasari	11	11
(Philippines) Irene Chiu	3	2
(Philippines) Paula Lynn Obañana	1	3
(Vietnam) Nguyễn Thị Bình Tho	11	11
(Indonesia) Fransisca Ratnasari	3	11	11
(Thailand) Mothila Meemek	11	4	5

Quarterfinals
1	(Thailand) Salakjit Ponsana	11	11
(Vietnam) Lê Ngọc Nguyên Nhung	7	6
3/4	(Singapore) Xing Aiying	4	13	6
(Indonesia) Adriyanti Firdasari	11	11	11
(Vietnam) Nguyễn Thị Bình Tho	8	0
3/4	(Malaysia) Wong Mew Choo	11	11
(Indonesia) Fransisca Ratnasari	8	9
2	(Singapore) Li Li	11	11

Semifinals
1	(Thailand) Salakjit Ponsana	6	11	12
(Indonesia) Adriyanti Firdasari	11	7	13
3/4	(Malaysia) Wong Mew Choo	11	11
2	(Singapore) Li Li	2	8

Finals
(Indonesia) Adriyanti Firdasari	11	11
3/4	(Malaysia) Wong Mew Choo	8	7

== Men's doubles ==
1st Round
(Malaysia) Choong Tan Fook (Malaysia) Wong Choong Hann	15	15
(Philippines) Ian Piencenaves (Philippines) Arolas Amahit Jr.	10	4
(Singapore) Khoo Kian Teck (Singapore) Alvin Fu	15	10	15
(Philippines) Jaime Junio Jr. (Philippines) Mark Alvin Natividad	11	15	8
(Vietnam) Trần Thanh Hải (Vietnam) Nguyễn Quang Minh	9	1
(Thailand) Songphon Anugritayawon (Thailand) Nitipong Saengsila	15	15

Quarterfinals
1	(Indonesia) Luluk Hadiyanto (Indonesia) Alvent Yulianto Chandra	15	15
(Vietnam) Nguyễn Hoàng Hải (Vietnam) Nguyễn Quang Phong	2	3
3/4	(Thailand) Sudket Prapakamol (Thailand) Patapol Ngernsrisuk	6	8
(Malaysia) Choong Tan Fook (Malaysia) Wong Choong Hann	15	15
(Singapore) Khoo Kian Teck (Singapore) Alvin Fu	7	8
3/4	(Indonesia) Markis Kido (Indonesia) Hendra Setiawan	15	15
(Thailand) Songphon Anugritayawon (Thailand) Nitipong Saengsila	12	9
2	(Malaysia) Chan Chong Ming (Malaysia) Koo Kien Keat	15	15

Semifinals
1	(Indonesia) Luluk Hadiyanto (Indonesia) Alvent Yulianto Chandra	15	15
(Malaysia) Choong Tan Fook (Malaysia) Wong Choong Hann	10	2
3/4	(Indonesia) Markis Kido (Indonesia) Hendra Setiawan	15	15
2	(Malaysia) Chan Chong Ming (Malaysia) Koo Kien Keat	13	13

Finals
1	(Indonesia) Luluk Hadiyanto (Indonesia) Alvent Yulianto Chandra	8	15	6
3/4	(Indonesia) Markis Kido (Indonesia) Hendra Setiawan	15	7	15

== Women's doubles ==
1st Round
(Vietnam) Lê Ngọc Nguyên Nhung (Vietnam) Nguyễn Thị Bình Tho	17	15
(Singapore) Frances Liu (Singapore) Shinta Mulia Sari	16	12
(Indonesia) Jo Novita (Indonesia) Greysia Polii	17	15
(Philippines) Kennie Asuncion (Philippines) Paula Lynn Obañana	14	2
(Indonesia) Lita Nurlita (Indonesia) Natalia Poluakan	15	15
(Vietnam) Trần Thị Thanh Thảo (Vietnam) Lê Thị Thanh Thúy	0	3
(Thailand) Sirivannavari Nariratana (Thailand) Sujitra Ekmongkolpaisarn	0	2
(Philippines) Irene Chiu (Philippines) Vanessa Tanco	15	15

Quarterfinals
1	(Thailand) Saralee Thungthongkam (Thailand) Sathinee Chankrachangwong	15	15
(Vietnam) Lê Ngọc Nguyên Nhung (Vietnam) Nguyễn Thị Bình Tho	6	3
3/4	(Malaysia) Ooi Sock Ai (Malaysia) Mooi Hing Yau	7	12
(Indonesia) Jo Novita (Indonesia) Greysia Polii	15	15
(Indonesia) Lita Nurlita (Indonesia) Natalia Poluakan	8	12
3/4	(Singapore) Jiang Yanmei (Singapore) Li Yujia	15	15
(Philippines) Irene Chiu (Philippines) Vanessa Tanco	4	3
2	(Malaysia) Wong Pei Tty (Malaysia) Chin Eei Hui	15	15

Semifinals
1	(Thailand) Saralee Thungthongkam (Thailand) Sathinee Chankrachangwong	8	15
(Indonesia) Jo Novita (Indonesia) Greysia Polii	15	17
3/4	(Singapore) Jiang Yanmei (Singapore) Li Yujia	8	12
2	(Malaysia) Wong Pei Tty (Malaysia) Chin Eei Hui	15	15

Finals
(Indonesia) Jo Novita (Indonesia) Greysia Polii	12	15	13
2	(Malaysia) Wong Pei Tty (Malaysia) Chin Eei Hui	15	9	15

== Mixed doubles ==
1st Round
(Philippines) Kennevic Asuncion (Philippines) Kennie Asuncion	14	10
(Thailand) Songphon Anugritayawon (Thailand) Kunchala Voravichitchaikul	17	15
(Vietnam) Nguyễn Hoàng Hải (Vietnam) Lê Thị Thanh Thủy	3	7
(Malaysia) Wong Choong Hann (Malaysia) Ooi Sock Ai	15	15
(Singapore) Muhd Azlin Bin Latib (Singapore) Vanessa Neo	6	13
(Vietnam) Trần Thanh Hải (Vietnam) Trần Thị Thanh Thảo	15	15
(Indonesia) Anggun Nugroho (Indonesia) Yunita Tetty	15	15
(Philippines) Ian Piencenaves (Philippines) Paula Lynn Obañana	6	3

Quarterfinals
1	(Indonesia) Nova Widianto (Indonesia) Liliyana Natsir	15	15
(Thailand) Songphon Anugritayawon (Thailand) Kunchala Voravichitchaikul	4	7
3/4	(Singapore) Hendri Saputra (Singapore) Li Yujia	9	15	15
(Malaysia) Wong Choong Hann (Malaysia) Ooi Sock Ai	15	8	2
(Vietnam) Trần Thanh Hải (Vietnam) Trần Thị Thanh Thảo	1	4
3/4	(Malaysia) Koo Kien Keat (Malaysia) Wong Pei Tty	15	15
(Indonesia) Anggun Nugroho (Indonesia) Yunita Tetty	15	7	15
2	(Thailand) Sudket Prapakamol (Thailand) Saralee Thungthongkam	10	15	9

Semifinals
1	(Indonesia) Nova Widianto (Indonesia) Liliyana Natsir	15	15
3/4	(Singapore) Hendri Saputra (Singapore) Li Yujia	8	4
3/4	(Malaysia) Koo Kien Keat (Malaysia) Wong Pei Tty	9	5
(Indonesia) Anggun Nugroho (Indonesia) Yunita Tetty	15	15

Finals
1	(Indonesia) Nova Widianto (Indonesia) Liliyana Natsir	15	15
(Indonesia) Anggun Nugroho (Indonesia) Yunita Tetty	6	2

== Men's team ==
Quarterfinals		Semifinals		Final
		Malaysia	3
Thailand	5	Thailand	0
Philippines	0			Malaysia	3
Vietnam	3			Indonesia	2
Singapore	2	Vietnam	0
		Indonesia	5

=== Quarter-finals ===
Thailand (THA)	5–0	Philippines (PHI)

Boonsak Ponsana	2–0	Kennevic Asuncion	15–6, 15–9
Poompat Sapkulchananart	2–0	Lloyd Escoses	15–5, 15–1
Jakrapan Thanathiratham	2–0	Rodel Bartolome	15–4, 15–1
Sudket Prapakamol / Patapol Ngernsrisuk	2–0	Ian Piencenaves / Arolas Amahit Jr.	15–6, 15–6
Songphon Anugritayawon / Nitipong Saengsila	2–0	Jaime Junio Jr. / Mark Alvin Natividad	15–9, 15–7

Vietnam (VIE)	3–2	Singapore (SIN)

Nguyễn Tiến Minh	0–2	Kendrick Lee	12–15, 5–15
Nguyễn Quang Minh	2–0	Aaron Tan	15–3, 15–7
Nguyễn Hoàng Hải	2–0	Chew Swee Hau	15–10, 15–1
Nguyễn Quang Minh / Nguyễn Hoàng Hải	2–1	Khoo Kian Teck / Alvin Fu	15–5, 10–15, 15–9
Trần Thanh Hải / Nguyễn Tiến Minh	1–2	Hendri Saputra / Kendrick Lee	3–15, 13–15

=== Semi-finals ===
Malaysia (MAS)	3–0	Thailand (THA)

Lee Chong Wei	2–1	Boonsak Ponsana	15–9, 11–15, 15–11
Muhd Hafiz Hashim	2–1	Poompat Sapkulchananart	6–15, 15–4, 15–12
Koo Kien Keat / Chan Chong Ming	2–1	Sudket Prapakamol / Patapol Ngernsrisuk	15–4, 9–15, 17–14

Vietnam (VIE)	0–5	Indonesia (INA)

Nguyễn Tiến Minh	0–2	Taufik Hidayat	12–15, 11–15
Nguyễn Hoàng Hải	0–2	Sony Dwi Kuncoro	1–15, 8–15
Nguyễn Quang Phong	0–2	Simon Santoso	3–15, 2–15
Trần Thanh Hải / Nguyễn Quang Minh	0–2	Alvent Yulianto Chandra / Luluk Hadiyanto	9–15, 9–15
Nguyễn Hoàng Hải / Nguyễn Quang Phong	0–2	Markis Kido / Hendra Setiawan	5–15, 12–15

=== Final ===
Malaysia (MAS)	3–2	Indonesia (INA)

Lee Chong Wei	0–2	Taufik Hidayat	13–15, 7–15
Chan Chong Ming / Koo Kien Keat	0–2	Alvent Yulianto Chandra / Luluk Hadiyanto	4–15, 9–15
Muhd Hafiz Hashim	2–0	Sony Dwi Kuncoro	15–11, 15–4
Choong Tan Fook / Lee Wan Wah	2–0	Markis Kido / Hendra Setiawan	15–12, 15–9
Wong Choong Hann	2–0	Simon Santoso	15–9, 15–7

== Women's team ==
Quarterfinals		Semifinals		Final
		Thailand	3
Malaysia	4	Malaysia	2
Vietnam	1			Thailand	3
Philippines	0			Singapore	2
Indonesia	5	Indonesia	2
		Singapore	3

=== Quarter-finals ===
Malaysia (MAS)	4–1	Vietnam (VIE)

Wong Mew Choo	2–0	Lê Ngọc Nguyên Nhung	11–0, 11–0
M. Sutheaswari	2–0	Nguyễn Thị Bình Tho	11–2, 11–8
Julia Wong Pei Xian	2–0	Phan Thị Trang	11–1, 11–8
Wong Pei Tty / Chin Eei Hui	2–0	Lê Ngọc Nguyên Nhung / Nguyễn Thị Bình Tho	15–7, 15–10
Mooi Hing Yau / Julia Wong Pei Xian	0–2	Trần Thị Thanh Thảo / Lê Thị Thanh Thúy	13–15, 9–15

Philippines (PHI)	0–5	Indonesia (INA)

Paula Lynn Obañana	0–2	Adriyanti Firdasari	0–11, 3–11
Irene Chiu	0–2	Fransisca Ratnasari	0–11, 1–11
Vanessa Tanco	0–2	Maria Kristin Yulianti	1–11, 1–11
Kennie Asuncion / Paula Lynn Obañana	0–2	Jo Novita / Greysia Polii	7–15, 3–15
Irene Chiu / Vanessa Tanco	0–2	Lita Nurlita / Maria Kristin Yulianti	0–15, 1–15

=== Semi-finals ===
Thailand (THA)	3–2	Malaysia (MAS)

Salakjit Ponsana	2–0	Wong Mew Choo	11–1, 11–5
Monthila Meemek	0–2	Julia Wong Pei Xian	10–13, 8–11
Sujitra Ekmongkolpaisarn	0–2	Norsyaliza Baharum	5–11, 3–11
Saralee Thungthongkam / Sathinee Chankrachangwong	2–1	Wong Pei Tty / Chin Eei Hui	15–10, 13–15, 15–6
Kunchala Voravichitchaikul / Sujitra Ekmongkolpaisarn	2–0	Ooi Sock Ai / Mooi Hing Yau	15–5, 15–9

Indonesia (INA)	2–3	Singapore (SIN)

Adriyanti Firdasari	2–1	Li Li	5–11, 11–8, 11–3
Fransisca Ratnasari	0–2	Xing Aiying	7–11, 5–11
Maria Kristin Yulianti	0–2	Jiang Yanmei	9–11, 7–11
Lita Nurlita / Liliyana Natsir	2–0	Frances Liu / Shinta Mulia Sari	15–1, 15–1
Jo Novita / Greysia Polii	1–2	Jiang Yanmei / Li Yujia	8–15, 15–2, 10–15

=== Final ===
Thailand (THA)	3–2	Singapore (SIN)

Salakjit Ponsana	2–0	Li Li	11–7, 11–7
Monthila Meemek	0–2	Xing Aiying	12–13, 2–11
Soratja Chansrisukot	1–2	Jiang Yanmei	13–10, 7–11, 5–11
Kunchala Voravichitchaikul / Sujitra Ekmongkolpaisarn	2–0	Frances Liu / Shinta Mulia Sari	15–2, 15–10
Saralee Thungthongkam / Sathinee Chankrachangwong	2–1	Jiang Yanmei / Li Yujia	12–15, 15–6, 15–2
