= Nguyễn Hoàng Hải (badminton) =

Vietnamese badminton player (born 1986)

Personal information
- Born: 8 May 1986 (age 40) Thái Bình, Vietnam
- Height: 1.90 m (6 ft 3 in)
- Weight: 85 kg (187 lb)

Sport
- Country: Vietnam
- Sport: Badminton
- Handedness: Right
- Event: Men's singles & doubles

Men's singles & doubles
- BWF profile
Medal record
Men's badminton
Representing Vietnam
Southeast Asian Games
Bronze medal – third place	2005 Manila	Men's team
Bronze medal – third place	2009 Vientiane	Men's singles

Nguyễn Hoàng Hải (born 8 May 1986) is a Vietnamese badminton player from Army team. He was the bronze medalists at the 2009 Southeast Asian Games in the men's singles event, also in the team event in 2005. He represented his country at the 2006 Asian Games.

== Achievements ==
=== Southeast Asian Games ===
Men's singles

Year	Venue	Opponent	Score	Result
2009	Gym Hall 1, National Sports Complex, Vientiane, Laos	(Indonesia) Simon Santoso	7–21, 14–21	Bronze
