= Songphon Anugritayawon =

Thai badminton player

Personal information
- Born: 31 October 1983 (age 43)
- Height: 1.83 m (6 ft 0 in)
- Weight: 79 kg (174 lb)

Sport
- Country: Thailand
- Sport: Badminton
- Handedness: Right

Men's & mixed doubles
- Highest ranking: 20 (MD 13 January 2011); 6 (XD 5 May 2011)
- BWF profile
Medal record
Men's Badminton
Representing Thailand
Sudirman Cup
Bronze medal – third place	2013 Kuala Lumpur	Mixed team
Asian Games
Bronze medal – third place	2010 Guangzhou	Men's team
Southeast Asian Games
Silver medal – second place	2009 Vientiane	Mixed doubles
Bronze medal – third place	2005 Manila	Men's team
Bronze medal – third place	2007 Nakhon Ratchasima	Men's team
Bronze medal – third place	2009 Vientiane	Men's team
Bronze medal – third place	2011 Jakarta–Palembang	Mixed doubles
Bronze medal – third place	2011 Jakarta–Palembang	Men's team
Summer Universiade
Gold medal – first place	2007 Bangkok	Mixed team
Bronze medal – third place	2007 Bangkok	Men's doubles
Asian Junior Championships
Silver medal – second place	2001 Taipei	Boys' doubles

Songphon Anugritayawon (Thai: ทรงพล อนุกฤตยาวรรณ; born 31 October 1983) is a Thai badminton player who specializes in doubles. He had a long and successful mixed doubles partnership with Kunchala Voravichitchaikul. Their biggest title came when they won the 2009 Japan Open. The same year, he and Voravichitchaikul took the silver medal at the Southeast Asian Games. Anugritayawon also competed at the 2006 and 2010 Asian Games, and won the men's team bronze in 2010.

== Achievements ==
=== Southeast Asian Games ===
Mixed doubles
Year	Venue	Partner	Opponent	Score	Result
2009	Gym Hall 1, National Sports Complex; Vientiane, Laos	(Thailand) Kunchala Voravichitchaikul	(Indonesia) Nova Widianto (Indonesia) Liliyana Natsir	10–21, 22–20, 9–21	Silver
2011	Istora Senayan; Jakarta, Indonesia	(Thailand) Kunchala Voravichitchaikul	(Indonesia) Tontowi Ahmad (Indonesia) Liliyana Natsir	19–21, 14–21	Bronze

=== Summer Universiade ===
Men's doubles
Year	Venue	Partner	Opponent	Score	Result
2007	Thammasat University; Pathum Thani, Thailand	(Thailand) Nuttaphon Narkthong	(Chinese Taipei) Tsai Chia-hsin (Chinese Taipei) Hsieh Yu-hsing	27–25, 21–23, 19–21	Bronze

=== Asian Junior Championships ===
Mixed doubles
Year	Venue	Partner	Opponent	Score	Result
2001	Taipei Gymnasium; Taipei, Taiwan	(Thailand) Adisak Wiriyapadungpong	(South Korea) Hwang Ji-man (South Korea) Lee Jae-jin	15–17, 1–15	Silver

=== BWF Superseries ===
The BWF Superseries, which was launched on 14 December 2006 and implemented in 2007, was a series of elite badminton tournaments, sanctioned by the Badminton World Federation (BWF). BWF Superseries levels were Superseries and Superseries Premier. A season of Superseries consisted of twelve tournaments around the world that had been introduced since 2011. Successful players were invited to the Superseries Finals, which were held at the end of each year.

Mixed doubles
Year	Tournament	Partner	Opponent	Score	Result
2009	Korea Open	(Thailand) Kunchala Voravichitchaikul	(South Korea) Lee Yong-dae (South Korea) Lee Hyo-jung	8–21, 7–21	(silver) Runner-up
2009	Japan Open	(Thailand) Kunchala Voravichitchaikul	(Denmark) Joachim Fischer Nielsen (Denmark) Christinna Pedersen	13–21, 21–16, 22–20	(gold) Winner

BWF Super Series Finals tournament
BWF Super Series Premier tournament
BWF Super Series tournament

=== BWF Grand Prix ===
The BWF Grand Prix had two levels, the Grand Prix and Grand Prix Gold. It was a series of badminton tournaments sanctioned by the Badminton World Federation (BWF) and played between 2007 and 2017.

Mixed doubles
Year	Tournament	Partner	Opponent	Score	Result
2009	Thailand Open	(Thailand) Kunchala Voravichitchaikul	(Thailand) Sudket Prapakamol (Thailand) Saralee Thungthongkam	11–21, 21–17, 21–14	(gold) Winner
2011	Australian Open	(Thailand) Kunchala Voravichitchaikul	(Japan) Hirokatsu Hashimoto (Japan) Mizuki Fujii	21–15, 21–9	(gold) Winner
2011	Dutch Open	(Thailand) Kunchala Voravichitchaikul	(Thailand) Sudket Prapakamol (Thailand) Saralee Thungthongkam	21–17, 24–22	(gold) Winner

BWF Grand Prix Gold tournament
BWF Grand Prix tournament

=== BWF International Challenge/Series ===
Men's doubles
Year	Tournament	Partner	Opponent	Score	Result
2009	Smiling Fish International	(Thailand) Nitipong Saengsila	(Thailand) Bodin Isara (Thailand) Maneepong Jongjit	12–21, 12–21	(silver) Runner-up

Mixed doubles
Year	Tournament	Partner	Opponent	Score	Result
2002	Smiling Fish Satellite	(Thailand) Sathinee Chankrachangwong	(Thailand) Panuwat Ngernsrisul (Thailand) Kunchala Voravichitchaikul	3–7, 7–5, 3–7	(silver) Runner-up
2003	Smiling Fish Satellite	(Thailand) Duanganong Aroonkesorn	(Thailand) Sudket Prapakamol (Thailand) Sathinee Chankrachangwong		(gold) Winner
2004	Smiling Fish Satellite	(Thailand) Duanganong Aroonkesorn	(China) Zhang Wei (China) Tao Xiaolan	6–15, 15–13, 15–6	(gold) Winner
2005	Smiling Fish Satellite	(Thailand) Kunchala Voravichitchaikul	(South Korea) Han Sang-hoon (South Korea) Kim Min-jung	15–12, 15–8	(gold) Winner
2006	Vietnam Satellite	(Thailand) Kunchala Voravichitchaikul	(Malaysia) Mohd Razif Abdul Latif (Malaysia) Norshahliza Baharum	21–13, 21–10	(gold) Winner
2006	Thailand Asian Satellite	(Thailand) Kunchala Voravichitchaikul	(Indonesia) Lingga Lie (Indonesia) Yulianti	21–16, 10–21, 17–21	(silver) Runner-up
2014	Smiling Fish International	(Thailand) Natcha Saengchote	(Thailand) Watchara Buranakruea (Thailand) Phataimas Muenwong	19–21, 10–21	(silver) Runner-up

BWF International Challenge tournament
BWF International Series tournament
