= Trần Thanh Hải =

Vietnamese badminton player (born 1982)

Personal information
- Born: 18 September 1982 (age 44)
- Height: 1.63 m (5 ft 4 in)
- Weight: 60 kg (132 lb)

Sport
- Country: Vietnam
- Sport: Badminton

Men's singles & doubles
- Highest ranking: 127 (XD 25 November 2004)
- BWF profile
Medal record
Men's badminton
Representing Vietnam
Southeast Asian Games
Bronze medal – third place	2005 Manila	Men's team

Trần Thanh Hải (born 18 September 1982) is a Vietnamese former badminton player from the Ho Chi Minh City team. He won the men's doubles title at the 2006 National Championships, partnered with Nguyễn Tiến Minh. He competed in four consecutive Southeast Asian Games, from 2001 to 2007, and was part of the national team that won the bronze medal in 2005. Trần also represented his country at the 2006 Asian Games and World Championships.

== Achievements ==
=== IBF International ===
Mixed doubles
Year	Tournament	Partner	Opponent	Score	Result
2004	Vietnam Satellite	(Vietnam) Trần Thị Thanh Thảo	(Thailand) Nuttaphon Narkthong (Thailand) Kunchala Voravichitchaikul	12–15, 10–15	(silver) Runner-up
2005	Jakarta Satellite	(Vietnam) Ngô Hải Vân	(India) Valiyaveetil Diju (India) Jwala Gutta	1–15, 3–15	(silver) Runner-up
