= Badminton at the 2006 Asian Games =

- Venue: Aspire Hall 3
- Dates: 30 November – 9 December
- Competitors: 162 from 20 nations

Badminton was contested at the 2006 Asian Games in Doha, Qatar. Singles, doubles, and team events were contested for both men and women. Mixed Doubles were also contested. Competition took place from November 30 to December 9. All events were held at Aspire Hall 3.

== Schedule ==
P	Preliminary rounds	¼	Quarterfinals	½	Semifinals	F	Final

Event↓/Date →	30th Thu	1st Fri	2nd Sat	3rd Sun	4th Mon	5th Tue	6th Wed	7th Thu		8th Fri		9th Sat
Men's singles						P	P	¼		½		F
Men's doubles						P	P	P	¼	½		F
Men's team	P		P	P	½	F						
Women's singles						P	P	¼		½		F
Women's doubles						P	P	P	¼	½		F
Women's team	P		P	P	½	F						
Mixed doubles							P	¼		½	F	

== Medalists ==
Event	Gold	Silver	Bronze
Men's singles	Taufik Hidayat; Indonesia	Lin Dan; China	Lee Hyun-il; South Korea
Men's singles	Taufik Hidayat; Indonesia	Lin Dan; China	Lee Chong Wei; Malaysia
Men's doubles	Malaysia; Koo Kien Keat; Tan Boon Heong	Indonesia; Luluk Hadiyanto; Alvent Yulianto	Indonesia; Markis Kido; Hendra Setiawan
Men's doubles	Malaysia; Koo Kien Keat; Tan Boon Heong	Indonesia; Luluk Hadiyanto; Alvent Yulianto	South Korea; Jung Jae-sung; Lee Yong-dae
Men's team	China; Bao Chunlai; Cai Yun; Chen Jin; Fu Haifeng; Guo Zhendong; Lin Dan; Xie Zhongbo; Zheng Bo	South Korea; Hwang Ji-man; Hwang Jung-woon; Jung Jae-sung; Lee Hyun-il; Lee Jae-jin; Lee Yong-dae; Park Sung-hwan; Shon Seung-mo	Indonesia; Luluk Hadiyanto; Taufik Hidayat; Markis Kido; Sony Dwi Kuncoro; Simon Santoso; Hendra Setiawan; Nova Widianto; Alvent Yulianto
Men's team	China; Bao Chunlai; Cai Yun; Chen Jin; Fu Haifeng; Guo Zhendong; Lin Dan; Xie Zhongbo; Zheng Bo	South Korea; Hwang Ji-man; Hwang Jung-woon; Jung Jae-sung; Lee Hyun-il; Lee Jae-jin; Lee Yong-dae; Park Sung-hwan; Shon Seung-mo	Malaysia; Mohd Hafiz Hashim; Koo Kien Keat; Kuan Beng Hong; Lee Chong Wei; Lin Woon Fui; Tan Boon Heong; Mohd Fairuzizuan Tazari; Wong Choong Hann
Women's singles	Wang Chen; Hong Kong	Yip Pui Yin; Hong Kong	Hwang Hye-youn; South Korea
Women's singles	Wang Chen; Hong Kong	Yip Pui Yin; Hong Kong	Xie Xingfang; China
Women's doubles	China; Gao Ling; Huang Sui	China; Zhang Jiewen; Yang Wei	South Korea; Lee Kyung-won; Lee Hyo-jung
Women's doubles	China; Gao Ling; Huang Sui	China; Zhang Jiewen; Yang Wei	Japan; Kumiko Ogura; Reiko Shiota
Women's team	China; Gao Ling; Huang Sui; Xie Xingfang; Yang Wei; Zhang Jiewen; Zhang Ning; Zhang Yawen; Zhu Lin	Japan; Eriko Hirose; Miyuki Maeda; Kaori Mori; Kumiko Ogura; Reiko Shiota; Satoko Suetsuna; Kanako Yonekura	Singapore; Siti Noor Ashikin; Jiang Yanmei; Li Li; Li Yujia; Frances Liu; Vanessa Neo; Shinta Mulia Sari; Xing Aiying
Women's team	China; Gao Ling; Huang Sui; Xie Xingfang; Yang Wei; Zhang Jiewen; Zhang Ning; Zhang Yawen; Zhu Lin	Japan; Eriko Hirose; Miyuki Maeda; Kaori Mori; Kumiko Ogura; Reiko Shiota; Satoko Suetsuna; Kanako Yonekura	South Korea; Ha Jung-eun; Hwang Hye-youn; Hwang Yu-mi; Jun Jae-youn; Lee Hyo-jung; Lee Hyun-jin; Lee Kyung-won; Lee Yun-hwa
Mixed doubles	China; Zheng Bo; Gao Ling	China; Xie Zhongbo; Zhang Yawen	Malaysia; Mohd Fairuzizuan Tazari; Wong Pei Tty
Mixed doubles	China; Zheng Bo; Gao Ling	China; Xie Zhongbo; Zhang Yawen	Thailand; Sudket Prapakamol; Saralee Thungthongkam

== Medal table ==
Rank	Nation	Gold	Silver	Bronze	Total
1	China (CHN)	4	3	1	8
2	Indonesia (INA)	1	1	2	4
3	Hong Kong (HKG)	1	1	0	2
4	Malaysia (MAS)	1	0	3	4
5	South Korea (KOR)	0	1	5	6
6	Japan (JPN)	0	1	1	2
7	Singapore (SIN)	0	0	1	1
7	Thailand (THA)	0	0	1	1
Totals (8 entries)		7	7	14	28

== Participating nations ==
A total of 162 athletes from 20 nations competed in badminton at the 2006 Asian Games:

- Bahrain (2)
- China (16)
- Chinese Taipei (9)
- Hong Kong (13)
- India (10)
- Indonesia (16)
- Iran (2)
- Japan (11)
- Macau (4)
- Malaysia (16)
- Mongolia (2)
- Nepal (1)
- Philippines (2)
- Singapore (12)
- South Korea (16)
- Sri Lanka (4)
- Syria (4)
- Thailand (16)
- Timor-Leste (2)
- Vietnam (4)
