= 2000 Asian Junior Badminton Championships – Girls' team =

Badminton championship in Kyoto, Japan

Girls' team at the 2000 Asian Junior Badminton Championships
- Venue: Nishiyama Park Gymnasium
- Location: Kyoto, Japan
- Dates: 21–24 July 2000

The girls' team tournament at the 2000 Asian Junior Badminton Championships took place from 21 to 24 July 2000 at the Nishiyama Park Gymnasium in Kyoto, Japan. A total of 10 countries competed in this event.

== Results ==
=== Bracket ===
Round of 16
Malaysia	1
Chinese Taipei	3
Singapore	3
Thailand	0

Quarter-finals
China	3
Sri Lanka	0
Indonesia	0
Chinese Taipei	3
Singapore	1
Japan	3
India	0
South Korea	3

Semi-finals
China	3
Chinese Taipei	0
Japan	1
South Korea	3

Final
China	3
South Korea	0

=== Round of 16 ===
Chinese Taipei
3
Nishiyama Park Gymnasium
21 July 2000

Malaysia
1

			1	2	3
1	(Chinese Taipei) (Malaysia)	Chien Yu-chin; Ng Mee Fen	11; 6	11; 4
2	(Chinese Taipei) (Malaysia)	Cheng Pei-ju; Sutheaswari Mudukasan	15; 1	15; 6
3	(Chinese Taipei) (Malaysia)	Cheng Hsiao-yun; Hemalatha Arikrishnan	11; 2	5; 11	6; 11
4	(Chinese Taipei) (Malaysia)	Cheng Wen-hsing / Chien Hsiu-lin; Chin Eei Hui / Wong Mew Choo	15; 10	15; 9
5	(Chinese Taipei) (Malaysia)	Chou Chia-chi / Ku Pei-ting; Hemalatha Arikrishnan / Sutheaswari Mudukasan				not played

Thailand
0
Nishiyama Park Gymnasium
21 July 2000

Singapore
3

			1	2	3
1	(Thailand) (Singapore)	Sathinee Chankrachangwong; Xiao Luxi	7; 11	5; 11
2	(Thailand) (Singapore)	Salakjit Ponsana; Li Li	11; 11	10; 13	5; 11
3	(Thailand) (Singapore)	Duanganong Aroonkesorn; Frances Liu	4; 11	3; 11
4	(Thailand) (Singapore)	Sathinee Chankrachangwong / Salakjit Ponsana; Li Li / Xiao Luxi				not played
5	(Thailand) (Singapore)	Duanganong Aroonkesorn / Kunchala Voravichitchaikul; Fan Jingjing / Frances Liu				not played

=== Quarter-finals ===
China
3
Nishiyama Park Gymnasium
22 July 2000

Sri Lanka
0

			1	2	3
1	(China) (Sri Lanka)	Wei Yan; Rasangi Ranatunge	11; 0	11; 1
2	(China) (Sri Lanka)	Yu Jin; Thilini Jayasinghe	11; 0	11; 1
3	(China) (Sri Lanka)	Wang Rong; Nadeesha Gayanthi	11; 1	11; 0
4	(China) (Sri Lanka)	Li Yujia / Zhao Tingting; Kanchana Gonawala / Thilini Jayasinghe				not played
5	(China) (Sri Lanka)	Wei Yili / Zhang Yawen; Marakkala Nilmini / Rasangi Ranatunge				not played

Indonesia
0
Nishiyama Park Gymnasium
22 July 2000

Chinese Taipei
3

			1	2	3
1	(Indonesia) (Chinese Taipei)	Silvi Antarini; Chien Yu-chin	10; 13	5; 11
2	(Indonesia) (Chinese Taipei)	Dewi Tira Arisandi; Cheng Pei-ju	6; 11	7; 11
3	(Indonesia) (Chinese Taipei)	Dian Novita Sari; Cheng Hsiao-yun	3; 11	6; 11
4	(Indonesia) (Chinese Taipei)	Lita Nurlita / Monica Permadi; Cheng Wen-hsing / Chien Hsiu-lin				not played
5	(Indonesia) (Chinese Taipei)	Silvi Antarini / Dewi Tira Arisandi; Chou Chia-chi / Ku Pei-ting				not played

Japan
3
Nishiyama Park Gymnasium
22 July 2000

Singapore
1

			1	2	3
1	(Japan) (Singapore)	Kumiko Ogura; Xiao Luxi	11; 5	3; 11	4; 11
2	(Japan) (Singapore)	Tomomi Matsuda; Li Li	13; 11	5; 11	11; 2
3	(Japan) (Singapore)	Aki Akao; Frances Liu	11; 6	11; 5
4	(Japan) (Singapore)	Kumiko Ogura / Reiko Shiota; Li Li / Xiao Luxi	15; 10	15; 3
5	(Japan) (Singapore)	Aki Akao / Tomomi Matsuda; Fan Jingjing / Frances Liu				not played

South Korea
3
Nishiyama Park Gymnasium
22 July 2000

India
0

			1	2	3
1	(South Korea) (India)	Jun Jae-youn; Parul Priyadarshini	11; 1	11; 1
2	(South Korea) (India)	Park Hyo-sun; Jwala Gutta	11; 8	11; 4
3	(South Korea) (India)	Seo Yoon-hee; Trupti Murgunde	11; 8	7; 11	13; 10
4	(South Korea) (India)	Jung Yeon-kyung / Kim So-yeon; Jwala Gutta / Shruti Kurien				not played
5	(South Korea) (India)	Hwang Yu-mi / Joo Hyun-hee; Trupti Murgunde / Parul Priyadarshini				not played

=== Semi-finals ===
China
3
Nishiyama Park Gymnasium
23 July 2000

Chinese Taipei
0

			1	2	3
1	(China) (Chinese Taipei)	Wei Yan; Chien Yu-chin	11; 2	11; 6
2	(China) (Chinese Taipei)	Yu Jin; Cheng Pei-ju	11; 4	11; 6
3	(China) (Chinese Taipei)	Wang Rong; Cheng Hsiao-yun	11; 1	11; 3
4	(China) (Chinese Taipei)	Li Yujia / Zhao Tingting; Cheng Wen-hsing / Chien Hsiu-lin				not played
5	(China) (Chinese Taipei)	Wei Yili / Zhang Yawen; Chou Chia-chi / Ku Pei-ting				not played

South Korea
3
Nishiyama Park Gymnasium
23 July 2000

Japan
1

			1	2	3
1	(South Korea) (Japan)	Jun Jae-youn; Marika Hirōka	11; 6	11; 9
2	(South Korea) (Japan)	Si Jin-sun; Kumiko Ogura	11; 5	4; 11	11; 7
3	(South Korea) (Japan)	Seo Yoon-hee; Tomomi Matsuda	12; 13	4; 11
4	(South Korea) (Japan)	Jung Yeon-kyung / Kim So-yeon; Kumiko Ogura / Reiko Shiota	15; 9	15; 13
5	(South Korea) (Japan)	Hwang Yu-mi / Joo Hyun-hee; Aki Akao / Tomomi Matsuda				not played

=== Final ===
China
0
Nishiyama Park Gymnasium
24 July 2000

South Korea
3

			1	2	3
1	(China) (South Korea)	Wei Yan; Jun Jae-youn	11; 4	11; 6
2	(China) (South Korea)	Yu Jin; Park Hyo-sun	11; 8	11; 4
3	(China) (South Korea)	Wang Rong; Lee Jong-boon	11; 9	11; 9
4	(China) (South Korea)	Li Yujia / Zhao Tingting; Jung Yeon-kyung / Kim So-yeon				not played
5	(China) (South Korea)	Wei Yili / Zhang Yawen; Hwang Yu-mi / Joo Hyun-hee				not played
