= 2007 German Open Grand Prix =

Coordinates: 51.4236°N 6.8929°E

Tournament details
- Dates: 27 February 2007 – 4 March 2007
- Edition: 50th
- Level: Grand Prix
- Total prize money: US$80,000
- Venue: Innogy Sporthalle
- Location: Mülheim, Germany

Champions
- Men's singles: (China) Lin Dan
- Women's singles: (China) Xie Xingfang
- Men's doubles: (South Korea) Lee Jae-jin (South Korea) Hwang Ji-man
- Women's doubles: (China) Yang Wei (China) Zhang Jiewen
- Mixed doubles: (China) Zheng Bo (China) Gao Ling

The 2007 German Open Grand Prix (officially known as the Yonex German Open 2007 for sponsorship reasons) was a badminton tournament which took place in Mülheim from 27 February to 4 March 2007. It had a total purse of $80,000.

== Tournament ==
The 2007 German Open Grand Prix was the inaugural tournament of the 2007 BWF Grand Prix Gold and Grand Prix and also part of the German Open championships which has been held since 1955. This tournament was organized by the German Badminton Association and sanctioned by the BWF.

=== Venue ===
This international tournament was held at Innogy Sporthalle in Mülheim, Germany.

=== Point distribution ===
Below is the point distribution for each phase of the tournament based on the BWF points system for the BWF Grand Prix event.

Winner	Runner-up	3/4	5/8	9/16	17/32	33/64	65/128	129/256	257/512
5,500	4,680	3,850	3,030	2,110	1,290	510	240	100	45

=== Prize money ===
The total prize money for this tournament was US$80,000. Distribution of prize money was in accordance with BWF regulations.

Event	Winner	Finalist	Semi-finals	Quarter-finals	Last 16
Men's singles	$6,400	$3,200	$1,600	$800	$320
Women's singles	$5,520	$2,640	$1,440	$720	—N/a
Men's doubles	$5,760	$3,200	$1,920	$1,120	—N/a
Women's doubles	$4,880	$3,200	$1,760	$880	—N/a
Mixed doubles	$4,880	$3,200	$1,760	$880	—N/a

== Men's singles ==
=== Seeds ===
1. (China) Lin Dan (champion)
2. (China) Chen Yu (final)
3. (Malaysia) Lee Tsuen Seng (third round)
4. (Poland) Przemysław Wacha (third round)
5. (Hong Kong) Ng Wei (second round)
6. (Denmark) Joachim Persson (quarter-finals)
7. (Malaysia) Sairul Amar Ayob (first round)
8. (Germany) Björn Joppien (second round)
9. (Singapore) Kendrick Lee Yen Hui (third round)
10. (Malaysia) Roslin Hashim (third round)
11. (South Korea) Park Sung-hwan (quarter-finals)
12. (Hong Kong) Chan Yan Kit (third round)
13. (India) Chetan Anand (first round)
14. (New Zealand) John Moody (second round)
15. (Denmark) Kasper Ødum (third round)
16. (Canada) Andrew Dabeka (first round)

=== Finals ===
Semi-finals
1	(China) Lin Dan	21	21
(India) Anup Sridhar	14	12
Q5	(China) Wu Yunyong	18	2^{r}
2	(China) Chen Yu	21	5

Final
1	(China) Lin Dan
2	(China) Chen Yu	w	/	o

=== Top half ===
==== Section 1 ====
First Round
1	(China) Lin D	21	21
Q3	(Indonesia) T Hidayat	15	13
(Indonesia) T Sugiarto	21	21
Q4	(Malaysia) M A Abdul Latif	19	10
10	(Malaysia) R Hashim	21	21
(England) N Rice	13	11
(Austria) J Koch	21	21
(Denmark) J Ø. Jørgensen	12	7
5	(Hong Kong) Ng W	21	18	21
(Canada) B Milroy	10	21	15
(Malaysia) Wong C H	23	21
(Estonia) R Must	21	16
9	(Singapore) K Lee Y H	21	21
(India) N Kanetkar	16	14
(Czech Republic) J Vondra	21	21
(Guatemala) P Yang	13	17

Second Round
1	(China) Lin D	21	21
(Indonesia) T Sugiarto	12	19
10	(Malaysia) R Hashim	20	21	21
(Austria) J Koch	22	6	11
5	(Hong Kong) Ng W	14	21
(Malaysia) Wong C H	21	23
9	(Singapore) K Lee Y H	21	21
(Czech Republic) J Vondra	15	18

Third Round
1	(China) Lin D	21	23
10	(Malaysia) R Hashim	16	21
(Malaysia) Wong C H	21	21
9	(Singapore) K Lee Y H	12	17

Quarter-finals
1	(China) Lin D	21	21
(Malaysia) Wong C H	15	14

==== Section 2 ====
First Round
3	(Malaysia) Lee T S	21	21
(England) A Ghaffar	8	18
(Australia) J Tho	15	16
(Malaysia) Tan C S	21	21
11	(South Korea) Park S-h	21	20	21
(Portugal) M Vasconcelos	8	22	13
(Finland) V Lång	21	22	21
(Canada) S Wojcikiewicz	23	20	8
8	(Germany) B Joppien	21	21
(Malaysia) Y Khrishnan	13	16
(India) A Sridhar	18	21	23
Q7	(Indonesia) A Adityawarman	21	9	21
15	(Denmark) K Ødum	21	22
(India) Parupalli K	16	20
(England) N Kidd	22	14
(Czech Republic) P Koukal	24	21

Second Round
3	(Malaysia) Lee T S	21	21
(Malaysia) Tan C S	14	11
11	(South Korea) Park S-h	21	21
(Finland) V Lång	11	15
8	(Germany) B Joppien	19	11
(India) A Sridhar	21	21
15	(Denmark) K Ødum	21	21
(Czech Republic) P Koukal	18	16

Third Round
3	(Malaysia) Lee T S	9	11
11	(South Korea) Park S-h	21	21
(India) A Sridhar	21	21
15	(Denmark) K Ødum	18	19

Quarter-finals
11	(South Korea) Park S-h	21	21	17
(India) A Sridhar	15	23	21

=== Bottom half ===
==== Section 3 ====
First Round
(Australia) S Gomez	11	11
(Japan) K Saeki	21	21
(China) Qiu YB	18	18
12	(Hong Kong) Chan Y K	21	21
PFQ	(Netherlands) K Ridder	13	9
Q6	(China) Lü Y	21	21
(India) A Pawar	19	21	21
7	(Malaysia) S A Ayob	21	14	18
Q5	(China) Wu YY	21	21
(Italy) K Raffeiner	7	8
(Iran) K Mehrabi	13	13
14	(New Zealand) J Moody	21	21
(Denmark) J-K Leth	21	21
(England) T Honey	16	16
(Indonesia) S Santoso	18	16
4	(Poland) P Wacha	21	21

Second Round
(Japan) K Saeki	17	13
12	(Hong Kong) Chan Y K	21	21
Q6	(China) Lü Y	18	21	21
(India) A Pawar	21	13	10
Q5	(China) Wu YY	21	21
14	(New Zealand) J Moody	13	14
(Denmark) J-K Leth	19	17
4	(Poland) P Wacha	21	21

Third Round
12	(Hong Kong) Chan Y K	16	8
Q6	(China) Lü Y	21	21
Q5	(China) Wu YY	21	21
4	(Poland) P Wacha	20	10

Quarter-finals
Q6	(China) Lü Y	15	21	15
Q5	(China) Wu YY	21	7	21

==== Section 4 ====
First Round
(Lithuania) K Navickas	12	21	21
Q2	(Indonesia) E Kurniawan	21	13	18
PFQ	(Malaysia) Liew D	22	21	21
16	(Canada) A Dabeka	20	23	17
(England) R Ouseph	20	21	21
(Denmark) C Lind Thomsen	22	10	15
(Czech Republic) J Fröhlich	6	16
6	(Denmark) J Persson	21	21
(Denmark) H-K Vittinghus	21	21
Q1	(Germany) S Schöttler	16	19
(France) E Kellhoffner	21	22
13	(India) C Anand	18	20
(Germany) R Spitko	24	14	16
(Denmark) M Christensen	22	21	21
Q8	(Japan) K Tago	17	21	13
2	(China) Chen Y	21	18	21

Second Round
(Lithuania) K Navickas	21	21
PFQ	(Malaysia) Liew D	19	12
(England) R Ouseph	8	15
6	(Denmark) J Persson	21	21
(Denmark) H-K Vittinghus	21	21
(France) E Kellhoffner	15	18
(Denmark) M Christensen	12	19
2	(China) Chen Y	21	21

Third Round
(Lithuania) K Navickas	12	12
6	(Denmark) J Persson	21	21
(Denmark) H Vittinghus	18	9
2	(China) Chen Y	21	21

Quarter-finals
6	(Denmark) J Persson	14	21	17
2	(China) Chen Y	21	18	21

== Women's singles ==
=== Seeds ===
1. (China) Xie Xingfang (champion)
2. (Germany) Huaiwen Xu (final)
3. (France) Pi Hongyan (semi-finals)
4. (Bulgaria) Petya Nedelcheva (semi-finals)
5. (Denmark) Tine Rasmussen (withdrew)
6. (Australia) Huang Chia-chi (quarter-finals)
7. (South Korea) Hwang Hye-youn (quarter-finals)
8. (Scotland) Susan Hughes (second round)

=== Finals ===
Semi-finals
1	(China) Xie Xingfang	21	21
4	(Bulgaria) Petya Nedelcheva	6	9
3	(France) Pi Hongyan	21	15	19
2	(Germany) Huaiwen Xu	17	21	21

Final
1	(China) Xie Xingfang	19	21	21
2	(Germany) Huaiwen Xu	21	12	19

=== Top half ===
==== Section 1 ====
First round
1	(China) Xie XF	21	21
(England) J Pittard	3	10
(Austria) S Prutsch	16	13
(Netherlands) R van Cutsen	21	21
8	(Scotland) S Hughes	21	22	21
(Denmark) C Sørensen	11	24	13
(Germany) J Schenk	16	21	21
(India) S Nehwal	21	19	19

Second round
1	(China) Xie XF	21	21
(Netherlands) R van Cutsen	12	13
8	(Scotland) S Hughes	21	12	7
(Germany) J Schenk	17	21	21

Quarter-finals
1	(China) Xie XF	10	21	21
(Germany) J Schenk	21	10	13

==== Section 2 ====
First round
4	(Bulgaria) P Nedelcheva	21	21
(Canada) A Rice	10	18
(Italy) A Allegrini	21	21
(Spain) Y Martínez	16	15
7	(South Korea) Hwang H-y	21	21
(Denmark) A M Pedersen	9	15
(United States) E Lee	20	14
(France) W Rahmawati	22	21

Second round
4	(Bulgaria) P Nedelcheva	21	21
(Italy) A Allegrini	8	9
7	(South Korea) Hwang H-y	21	21
(France) W Rahmawati	14	5

Quarter-finals
4	(Bulgaria) P Nedelcheva	9	21	21
7	(South Korea) Hwang H-y	21	16	18

=== Bottom half ===
==== Section 3 ====
First round
(New Zealand) R Hindley	17	13
(Finland) A Nieminen	21	21
(Slovenia) M Tvrdy	11	8
6	(Australia) Huang C-c	21	21
(South Korea) Lee H-j	18	16
(Malaysia) A R Kaur	21	21
(China) Wang L	16	10
3	(France) Pi HY	21	21

Second round
(Finland) A Nieminen	12	14
6	(Australia) Huang C-c	21	21
(Malaysia) A R Kaur	16	12
3	(France) Pi HY	21	21

Quarter-finals
6	(Australia) Huang C-c	6	10
3	(France) Pi HY	21	21

==== Section 4 ====
First round
Q3	(Czech Republic) K Ludíková	21	12	13
(Japan) C Umezu	16	21	21
Q2	(Ukraine) E Nozdran	21	17	18
PFQ	(Indonesia) A Rosalina	12	21	21
(Sweden) S Persson	21	21
Q1	(Japan) A Goto	14	13
Q4	(China) Wang YH	18	17
2	(Germany) HW Xu	21	21

Second round
(Japan) C Umezu	21	21
PFQ	(Indonesia) A Rosalina	14	13
(Sweden) S Persson	19	10
2	(Germany) HW Xu	21	21

Quarter-finals
(Japan) C Umezu	14	12
2	(Germany) HW Xu	21	21

== Men's doubles ==
=== Seeds ===
1. (South Korea) Jung Jae-sung / Lee Yong-dae (final)
2. (Hong Kong) Albertus Susanto Njoto / Yohan Hadikusumo Wiratama (semi-finals)
3. (Germany) Michael Fuchs / Roman Spitko (first round)
4. (Australia) Ashley Brehaut / Aji Basuki Sindoro (withdrew)
5. (South Korea) Hwang Ji-man / Lee Jae-jin (champions)
6. (China) Shen Ye / Xu Chen (second round)
7. (China) Guo Zhendong / He Hanbin (second round)
8. (Indonesia) Sigit Budiarto / Fran Kurniawan (semi-finals)

=== Finals ===
Semi-finals
1	(South Korea) Jung Jae-sung (South Korea) Lee Yong-dae	21	13	21
8	(Indonesia) Sigit Budiarto (Indonesia) Fran Kurniawan	12	21	18
5	(South Korea) Hwang Ji-man (South Korea) Lee Jae-jin	21	16	21
2	(Hong Kong) Albertus Susanto Njoto (Hong Kong) Yohan Hadikusumo Wiratama	16	21	16

Final
1	(South Korea) Jung Jae-sung (South Korea) Lee Yong-dae	18	20
5	(South Korea) Hwang Ji-man (South Korea) Lee Jae-jin	21	22

=== Top half ===
==== Section 1 ====
First Round
1	(South Korea) Jung J-s (South Korea) Lee Y-d	21	21
(Malaysia) M R Abdul Latif (Malaysia) Khoo C C	11	13
(New Zealand) J Gordon (New Zealand) D Shirley	19	21	22
PFQ	(England) C Langridge (England) D Lindley	21	13	24
7	(China) Guo ZD (China) He HB	21	12	21
(England) D George (England) C Tonks	17	21	14
(Germany) K Hopp (Germany) I Kindervater	21	12	21
(India) R Kumar K. T. (India) S Thomas	19	21	23

Second Round
1	(South Korea) Jung J-s (South Korea) Lee Y-d	21	21
PFQ	(England) C Langridge (England) D Lindley	10	11
7	(China) Guo ZD (China) He HB	21	19	18
(India) R Kumar K. T. (India) S Thomas	16	21	21

Quarter-finals
1	(South Korea) Jung J-s (South Korea) Lee Y-d	21	21
(India) R Kumar K. T. (India) S Thomas	9	15

==== Section 2 ====
First Round
PFQ	(Scotland) W Briggs (England) M Honey	11	7
Q3	(Malaysia) Chan C M (Malaysia) Hoon T H	21	21
(Japan) K Kawaguchi (Japan) N Kawamae	21	18	21
(Denmark) J Chemnitz (Denmark) M D Larsen	19	21	19
8	(Indonesia) S Budiarto (Indonesia) F Kurniawan	21	21
(Germany) T Dettmann (Germany) J Schöttler	18	14
(Canada) M Beres (Canada) W Milroy	21	20	21
(England) R Eidestedt (England) A Ellis	15	22	13

Second Round
Q3	(Malaysia) Chan C M (Malaysia) Hoon T H	21	21
(Japan) K Kawaguchi (Japan) N Kawamae	14	12
8	(Indonesia) S Budiarto (Indonesia) F Kurniawan	21	21
(Canada) M Beres (Canada) W Milroy	13	14

Quarter-finals
Q3	(Malaysia) Chan C M (Malaysia) Hoon T H	21	17	14
8	(Indonesia) S Budiarto (Indonesia) F Kurniawan	13	21	21

=== Bottom half ===
==== Section 3 ====
First Round
Q2	(Indonesia) M Ahsan (Indonesia) B Septano	20	21
Q1	(Malaysia) Lim K W (Malaysia) Mak H C	22	23
(Denmark) P Buur Steffensen (Denmark) R Magnor Andersen	21	17	16
5	(South Korea) Hwang J-m (South Korea) Lee J-j	16	21	21
(England) R Adcock (England) R Middleton	21	12	21
(Malaysia) Chan P S (Malaysia) Chang H P	16	21	18
(United States) H Bach (United States) K Malaythong	20	21	21
3	(Germany) M Fuchs (Germany) R Spitko	22	13	19

Second Round
Q1	(Malaysia) Lim K W (Malaysia) Mak H C	12	13
5	(South Korea) Hwang J-m (South Korea) Lee J-j	21	21
(England) R Adcock (England) R Middleton	21	21
(United States) H Bach (United States) K Malaythong	18	16

Quarter-finals
5	(South Korea) Hwang J-m (South Korea) Lee J-j	21	21
(England) R Adcock (England) R Middleton	11	15

==== Section 4 ====
First Round
(South Korea) Han S-h (South Korea) Yoo Y-s	21	21
SUB	(Scotland) A Bowman (Netherlands) J de Ruiter	7	17
(France) M Popov (France) S Stoyanov	21	18	9
6	(China) Shen Y (China) Xu C	11	21	21
(Malaysia) Ong S H (Malaysia) Tan B S	21	21
(Australia) R Smith (Australia) G Warfe	15	17
Q4	(Malaysia) M A Abdul Latif (Malaysia) V I Mawan	15	12
2	(Hong Kong) A S Njoto (Hong Kong) Y H Wiratama	21	21

Second Round
(South Korea) Han S-h (South Korea) Yoo Y-s	22	10	21
6	(China) Shen Y (China) Xu C	20	21	14
(Malaysia) Ong S H (Malaysia) Tan B S	16	15
2	(Hong Kong) A S Njoto (Hong Kong) Y H Wiratama	21	21

Quarter-finals
(South Korea) Han S-h (South Korea) Yoo Y-s	17	15
2	(Hong Kong) A S Njoto (Hong Kong) Y H Wiratama	21	21

== Women's doubles ==
=== Seeds ===
1. (China) Yang Wei / Zhang Jiewen (champions)
2. (China) Du Jing / Yu Yang (final)
3. (South Korea) Lee Hyo-jung / Lee Kyung-won (semi-finals)
4. (Bulgaria) Diana Dimova / Petya Nedelcheva (first round)
5. (South Korea) Hwang Yu-mi / Kim Min-jung (semi-finals)
6. (China) Pan Pan / Tian Qing (quarter-finals)
7. (Malaysia) Lim Pek Siah / Joanne Quay (second round)
8. (England) Natalie Munt / Joanne Nicholas (second round)

=== Finals ===
Semi-finals
1	(China) Yang Wei (China) Zhang Jiewen	21	21
5	(South Korea) Hwang Yu-mi (South Korea) Kim Min-jung	9	13
3	(South Korea) Lee Hyo-jung (South Korea) Lee Kyung-won	17	19
2	(China) Du Jing (China) Yu Yang	21	21

Final
1	(China) Yang Wei (China) Zhang Jiewen	21	21
2	(China) Du Jing (China) Yu Yang	8	7

=== Top half ===
==== Section 1 ====
First Round
1	(China) Yang W (China) Zhang JW	21	21
(Indonesia) N K Maheswari (Indonesia) N Melati	11	10
PFQ	(Japan) I Tatani (Japan) A Wakisaka	11	13
Q2	(China) Cheng S (China) Zhao YL	21	21
8	(England) N Munt (England) J Nicholas	14	21	21
(Netherlands) R van Cutsen (Netherlands) P van Dooremalen	21	18	13
(Japan) Y Imabeppu (Japan) S Matsuo	19	21	17
(South Korea) Hong S-j (South Korea) Jung Y-k	21	19	21

Second Round
1	(China) Yang W (China) Zhang JW	21	21
Q2	(China) Cheng S (China) Zhao YL	11	9
8	(England) N Munt (England) J Nicholas	15	22	19
(South Korea) Hong S-j (South Korea) Jung Y-k	21	20	21

Quarter-finals
1	(China) Yang W (China) Zhang JW	21	24
(South Korea) Hong S-j (South Korea) Jung Y-k	14	22

==== Section 2 ====
First Round
4	(Bulgaria) D Dimova (Bulgaria) P Nedelcheva	21	15	15
(Germany) N Grether (Germany) J Schenk	17	21	21
(Australia) S Dobson (Australia) T Luiz	10	13
(India) J Gutta (India) S Kurien	21	21
5	(South Korea) Hwang Y-m (South Korea) Kim M-j	21	22
(Malaysia) Haw C H (Malaysia) Lim Y L	8	20
(Sweden) E Bergblom (Sweden) J Persson	21	21
(England) S Bok (England) L Parker	19	14

Second Round
(Germany) N Grether (Germany) J Schenk	21	21
(India) J Gutta (India) S Kurien	15	6
5	(South Korea) Hwang Y-m (South Korea) Kim M-j	19	21	21
(Sweden) E Bergblom (Sweden) J Persson	21	14	12

Quarter-finals
(Germany) N Grether (Germany) J Schenk	16	15
5	(South Korea) Hwang Y-m (South Korea) Kim M-j	21	21

=== Bottom half ===
==== Section 3 ====
First Round
(Germany) M Peiffer (Germany) K Piotrowski	21	21
(United States) E Lee (United States) M Mangkalakiri	15	13
(Canada) V Loker (Canada) S MacMaster	5	4
6	(China) Pan P (China) Tian Q	21	21
(Netherlands) L Malaihollo (Netherlands) Y Sie	9	13
(Indonesia) S P Irawati (Indonesia) M Jauhari	21	21
(France) É Eymard (France) W Rahmawati	13	11
3	(South Korea) Lee H-j (South Korea) Lee K-w	21	21

Second Round
(Germany) M Peiffer (Germany) K Piotrowski	10	12
6	(China) Pan P (China) Tian Q	21	21
(Indonesia) S P Irawati (Indonesia) M Jauhari	6	10
3	(South Korea) Lee H-j (South Korea) Lee K-w	21	21

Quarter-finals
6	(China) Pan P (China) Tian Q	11	18
3	(South Korea) Lee H-j (South Korea) Lee K-w	21	21

==== Section 4 ====
First Round
(Germany) C Mette (Germany) B Overzier	19	16
Q1	(Germany) J Köhler (Germany) S Marinello	21	21
(Russia) E Ananina (Russia) A Russkikh	21	24	19
7	(Malaysia) Lim P S (Malaysia) J Quay	10	26	21
SUB	(Scotland) I Bankier (England) S Rayappan	22	21
(Indonesia) L Nurlita (Indonesia) N C Poluakan	20	16
(Denmark) C Pedersen (Denmark) M Schjøtt-Kristensen	13	7
2	(China) Du J (China) Yu Y	21	21

Second Round
Q1	(Germany) J Köhler (Germany) S Marinello	22	16	21
7	(Malaysia) Lim P S (Malaysia) J Quay	20	21	16
SUB	(Scotland) I Bankier (England) S Rayappan	10	8
2	(China) Du J (China) Yu Y	21	21

Quarter-finals
Q1	(Germany) J Köhler (Germany) S Marinello	10	7
2	(China) Du J (China) Yu Y	21	21

== Mixed doubles ==
=== Seeds ===
1. (England) Nathan Robertson / Gail Emms (quarter-finals)
2. (France) Svetoslav Stoyanov / Élodie Eymard (second round)
3. (Germany) Ingo Kindervater / Kathrin Piotrowski (quarter-finals)
4. (New Zealand) Daniel Shirley / (Malaysia) Joanne Quay (quarter-finals)
5. (China) Xu Chen / Zhao Tingting (final)
6. (China) Zheng Bo / Gao Ling (champions)
7. (South Korea) Lee Yong-dae / Lee Hyo-jung (semi-finals)
8. (China) He Hanbin / Yu Yang (second round)

=== Finals ===
Semi-finals
6	(China) Zheng Bo (China) Gao Ling	21	21
7	(South Korea) Lee Yong-dae (South Korea) Lee Hyo-jung	9	17
5	(China) Xu Chen (China) Zhao Tingting	21	19	21
(England) David Lindley (England) Suzanne Rayappan	18	21	16

Final
6	(China) Zheng Bo (China) Gao Ling	21	21
5	(China) Xu Chen (China) Zhao Tingting	11	10

=== Top half ===
==== Section 1 ====
First Round
1	(England) N Robertson (England) G Emms	21	21
(Indonesia) D Lahardi Fitriawan (Indonesia) L Nurlita	16	18
(South Korea) Han S-h (South Korea) Hwang Y-m	21	21
SUB	(Denmark) J Chemnitz (Denmark) C Pedersen	8	19
6	(China) Zheng B (China) Gao L	21	21
PFQ	(South Korea) Yoo Y-s (South Korea) Kim M-j	15	13
(United States) H Bach (United States) E Lee	21	17	16
Q3	(Denmark) M Larsen (Denmark) M Schjøtt-Kristensen	19	21	21

Second Round
1	(England) N Robertson (England) G Emms	13	21	21
(South Korea) Han S-h (South Korea) Hwang Y-m	21	16	17
6	(China) Zheng B (China) Gao L	21	21
Q3	(Denmark) M Larsen (Denmark) M Schjøtt-Kristensen	13	11

Quarterfinals
1	(England) N Robertson (England) G Emms	19	14
6	(China) Zheng B (China) Gao L	21	21

==== Section 2 ====
First Round
3	(Germany) I Kindervater (Germany) K Piotrowski	21	21
(Malaysia) Chan P S (Malaysia) Haw C H	12	19
(Scotland) W Briggs (Scotland) I Bankier	21	21
(Canada) M Beres (Canada) V Loker	11	16
7	(South Korea) Lee Y-d (South Korea) Lee H-j	21	21
Q1	(Netherlands) J de Ruiter (Netherlands) I Vaessen	10	10
(Australia) R Smith (Australia) T Luiz	14	16
Q2	(England) C Langridge (England) J Nicholas	21	21

Second Round
3	(Germany) I Kindervater (Germany) K Piotrowski	18	21	21
(Scotland) W Briggs (Scotland) I Bankier	21	13	10
7	(South Korea) Lee Y-d (South Korea) Lee H-j	21	21
Q2	(England) C Langridge (England) J Nicholas	10	11

Quarter-finals
3	(Germany) I Kindervater (Germany) K Piotrowski	20	10
7	(South Korea) Lee Y-d (South Korea) Lee H-j	22	21

=== Bottom half ===
==== Section 3 ====
First Round
(Scotland) A Bowman (England) N Munt	21	15
PFQ	(Germany) M Fuchs (Germany) C Mette	23	21
(Germany) T Dettmann (Germany) A Lillie	19	21	15
5	(China) Xu C (China) Zhao TT	21	19	21
(Australia) G Warfe (Australia) S Dobson	14	8
(England) R Middleton (England) L Parker	21	21
(England) R Adcock (England) S Bok	21	14	15
4	(New Zealand) D Shirley (Malaysia) J Quay	16	21	21

Second Round
PFQ	(Germany) M Fuchs (Germany) C Mette	10	15
5	(China) Xu C (China) Zhao TT	21	21
(England) R Middleton (England) L Parker	20	22
4	(New Zealand) D Shirley (Malaysia) J Quay	22	24

Quarter-finals
5	(China) Xu C (China) Zhao TT	21	21
4	(New Zealand) D Shirley (Malaysia) J Quay	7	10

==== Section 4 ====
First Round
(South Korea) Hwang J-m (South Korea) Jung Y-k	21	21
(Indonesia) L Lie (Indonesia) N K Maheswari	8	17
(United States) K Malaythong (United States) M Mangkalakiri	9	6
8	(China) He HB (China) Yu Y	21	21
(Germany) K Hopp (Germany) B Overzier	13	10
(England) D Lindley (England) S Rayappan	21	21
Q4	(Denmark) R Andersen (Russia) A Russkikh	21	13	12
2	(France) S Stoyanov (France) É Eymard	11	21	21

Second Round
(South Korea) Hwang J-m (South Korea) Jung Y-k	22	14	22
8	(China) He HB (China) Yu Y	20	21	20
(England) D Lindley (England) S Rayappan	21	21
2	(France) S Stoyanov (France) É Eymard	16	18

Quarter-finals
(South Korea) Hwang J-m (South Korea) Jung Y-k	21	17	18
(England) D Lindley (England) S Rayappan	18	21	21

Preceded by —	2007 BWF Grand Prix Gold and Grand Prix; 2007 BWF season	Succeeded by 2007 New Zealand Open Grand Prix
