= 2007 All England Super Series =

Badminton championships

2007 All England Open Super Series
Tournament details
- Dates: 6 March 2007– 11 March 2007
- Edition: 97th
- Level: Super Series
- Total prize money: US$200,000
- Venue: National Indoor Arena
- Location: Birmingham, England

Champions
- Men's singles: (China) Lin Dan
- Women's singles: (China) Xie Xingfang
- Men's doubles: (Malaysia) Koo Kien Keat (Malaysia) Tan Boon Heong
- Women's doubles: (China) Wei Yili (China) Zhang Yawen
- Mixed doubles: (China) Zheng Bo (China) Gao Ling

The 2007 All England Open Super Series (officially known as the Yonex All England Open 2007 for sponsorship reasons) was a badminton tournament which took place at National Indoor Stadium in Birmingham, England, from 6 to 11 March 2007 and had a total purse of $200,000.

== Tournament ==
The 2007 All England Open Super Series was the third tournament of the 2007 BWF Super Series and also part of the All England Open championships, which had been held since 1899.

=== Venue ===
This international tournament was held at National Indoor Arena in Birmingham, England.

=== Point distribution ===
Below is the point distribution for each phase of the tournament based on the BWF points system for the BWF Super Series event.

Winner	Runner-up	3/4	5/8	9/16	17/32	33/64	65/128	129/256
9,200	7,800	6,420	5,040	3,600	2,220	880	430	170

=== Prize money ===
The total prize money for this tournament was US$200,000. Distribution of prize money was in accordance with BWF regulations.

Event	Winner	Finalist	Semi-finals	Quarter-finals	Last 16
Men's singles	$16,000	$8,000	$4,000	$2,000	$800
Women's singles	$13,800	$6,600	$3,600	$1,800	—N/a
Men's doubles	$14,400	$8,000	$4,800	$2,800	—N/a
Women's doubles	$12,200	$8,000	$4,400	$2,200	—N/a
Mixed doubles	$12,200	$8,000	$4,400	$2,200	—N/a

== Men's singles ==
=== Seeds ===
1. (China) Lin Dan (champion)
2. (China) Chen Jin (semi-finals)
3. (Malaysia) Lee Chong Wei (quarter-finals)
4. (Denmark) Peter Gade (first round)
5. (China) Bao Chunlai (semi-finals)
6. (China) Chen Yu (final)
7. (Denmark) Kenneth Jonassen (quarter-finals)
8. (Malaysia) Muhammad Hafiz Hashim (second round)

=== Finals ===
Semi-finals
1	(China) Lin Dan	21	21
5	(China) Bao Chunlai	14	16
6	(China) Chen Yu	21	9	21
2	(China) Chen Jin	18	21	13

Final
1	(China) Lin Dan	21	21
6	(China) Chen Yu	13	12

=== Top half ===
==== Section 1 ====
First Round
1	(China) Lin D	24	16	21
(Malaysia) R Hashim	22	21	9
(Malaysia) Lee T S	21	13	9
Q3	(Indonesia) S Santoso	15	21	21
8	(Malaysia) M H Hashim	26	21
PFQ	(New Zealand) J Moody	24	17
(Germany) B Joppien	8	15
(Indonesia) S D Kuncoro	21	21

Second Round
1	(China) Lin D	21	21
Q3	(Indonesia) S Santoso	14	18
8	(Malaysia) M H Hashim	11	14
(Indonesia) S D Kuncoro	21	21

Quarter-finals
1	(China) Lin D	18	21	21
(Indonesia) S D Kuncoro	21	11	18

==== Section 2 ====
First Round
4	(Denmark) P Gade	21	19	19
(Netherlands) D Palyama	15	21	21
(Singapore) K Lee Y H	12	14
Q4	(Japan) S Satō	21	21
5	(China) Bao CL	18	21	23
(Singapore) R Susilo	21	15	21
(Netherlands) E Pang	11	21	7
(Wales) R Vaughan	21	17	21

Second Round
(Netherlands) D Palyama	10	14
Q4	(Japan) S Satō	21	21
5	(China) Bao CL	15	21	21
(Wales) R Vaughan	21	12	8

Quarter-finals
Q4	(Japan) S Satō	10	21	12
5	(China) Bao CL	21	8	21

=== Bottom half ===
==== Section 3 ====
First Round
(Thailand) B Ponsana	21	21
Q1	(Malaysia) Tan C S	12	7
(Hong Kong) Chan Y K	19	18
6	(China) Chen Y	21	21
(Denmark) J Persson	23	15
Q2	(Denmark) K Ødum	25	21
(India) C Anand	12	4
3	(Malaysia) Lee C W	21	21

Second Round
(Thailand) B Ponsana	14	10
6	(China) Chen Y	21	21
Q2	(Denmark) K Ødum	16	16
3	(Malaysia) Lee C W	21	21

Quarter-finals
6	(China) Chen Y	21	22
3	(Malaysia) Lee C W	19	20

==== Section 4 ====
First Round
(Malaysia) Yeoh K B	11	15
(South Korea) Park S-h	21	21
(Poland) P Wacha	14	17
7	(Denmark) K Jonassen	21	21
(Hong Kong) Ng W	16	21	21
(Malaysia) S A Ayob	21	15	13
(England) A Smith	11	13
2	(China) Chen J	21	21

Second Round
(South Korea) Park S-h	16	21	17
7	(Denmark) K Jonassen	21	18	21
(Hong Kong) Ng W	17	18
2	(China) Chen J	21	21

Quarter-finals
7	(Denmark) K Jonassen	19	19
2	(China) Chen J	21	21

== Women's singles ==
=== Seeds ===
1. (China) Xie Xingfang (champion)
2. (China) Zhang Ning (semi-finals)
3. (Hong Kong) Wang Chen (quarter-finals)
4. (Germany) Huaiwen Xu (quarter-finals)
5. (China) Zhu Lin (semi-finals)
6. (Netherlands) Yao Jie (first round)
7. (China) Lu Lan (first round)
8. (France) Pi Hongyan (final)

=== Finals ===
Semi-finals
1	(China) Xie Xingfang	21	21
5	(China) Zhu Lin	14	19
8	(France) Pi Hongyan	21	21	24
2	(China) Zhang Ning	18	23	22

Final
1	(China) Xie Xingfang	21	21
8	(France) Pi Hongyan	6	13

=== Top half ===
==== Section 1 ====
First Round
1	(China) Xie XF	21	21
(Netherlands) J Meulendijks	14	9
(Japan) E Hirose	21	14	17
Q1	(Thailand) S Ponsana	14	21	21
6	(Netherlands) Yao J	19	21	7
(China) Jiang YJ	21	19	21
(Malaysia) J Wong P X	21	21
Q2	(Thailand) M Meemeak	13	6

Second Round
1	(China) Xie XF	21	21
Q1	(Thailand) S Ponsana	10	9
(China) Jiang YJ	21	21
(Malaysia) J Wong P X	13	12

Quarter-finals
1	(China) Xie XF	21	21
(China) Jiang YJ	8	17

==== Section 2 ====
First Round
4	(Germany) HW Xu	21	21
(Singapore) Li L	8	9
(Bulgaria) P Nedelcheva	17	23	23
(Denmark) T Rasmussen	21	21	21
5	(China) Zhu L	21	21
(Scotland) S Hughes	11	14
(Russia) E Karachkova	21	16	21
(Finland) A Nieminen	18	21	14

Second Round
4	(Germany) HW Xu	21	21
(Bulgaria) P Nedelcheva	13	18
5	(China) Zhu L	21	21
(Russia) E Karachkova	17	8

Quarter-finals
4	(Germany) HW Xu	21	19	17
5	(China) Zhu L	19	21	21

=== Bottom half ===
==== Section 3 ====
First Round
(Hong Kong) Yip P Y	19	19
(Germany) J Schenk	21	21
(Australia) Huang C-c	17	15
8	(France) Pi HY	21	21
(India) S Nehwal	20	21	21
Q4	(Malaysia) A R Kaur	22	15	19
(Japan) Y Hirayama	21	12	12
3	(Hong Kong) Wang C	15	21	21

Second Round
(Germany) J Schenk	12	8
8	(France) Pi HY	21	21
(India) S Nehwal	21	13	16
3	(Hong Kong) Wang C	17	21	21

Quarter-finals
8	(France) Pi HY	19	21	21
3	(Hong Kong) Wang C	21	18	11

==== Section 4 ====
First Round
(China) Wang L	21	21
Q3	(Singapore) Xing AY	7	12
(Malaysia) Wong M C	21	21
7	(China) Lu L	12	19
(Japan) K Mori	14	12
(South Korea) Hwang H-y	21	21
(Sweden) S Persson	14	21
2	(China) Zhang N	21	23

Second Round
(China) Wang L	21	17	14
(Malaysia) Wong M C	18	21	21
(South Korea) Hwang H-y	18	8
2	(China) Zhang N	21	21

Quarter-finals
(Malaysia) Wong M C	17	15
2	(China) Zhang N	21	21

== Men's doubles ==
=== Seeds ===
1. (China) Cai Yun / Fu Haifeng (final)
2. (Denmark) Jens Eriksen / Martin Lundgaard Hansen (semi-finals)
3. (Indonesia) Markis Kido / Hendra Setiawan (second round)
4. (South Korea) Jung Jae-sung / Lee Yong-dae (quarter-finals)
5. (United States) Tony Gunawan / (Indonesia) Candra Wijaya (semi-finals)
6. (South Korea) Hwang Ji-man / Lee Jae-jin (second round)
7. (Malaysia) Choong Tan Fook / Lee Wan Wah (quarter-finals)
8. (Malaysia) Koo Kien Keat / Tan Boon Heong (champions)

=== Finals ===
Semi-finals
1	(China) Cai Yun (China) Fu Haifeng	18	21	21
5	(United States) Tony Gunawan (Indonesia) Candra Wijaya	21	19	18
8	(Malaysia) Koo Kien Keat (Malaysia) Tan Boon Heong	21	21
2	(Denmark) Jens Eriksen (Denmark) Martin Lundgaard Hansen	15	13

Final
1	(China) Cai Yun (China) Fu Haifeng	15	18
8	(Malaysia) Koo Kien Keat (Malaysia) Tan Boon Heong	21	21

=== Top half ===
==== Section 1 ====
First Round
1	(China) Cai Y (China) Fu HF	21	21
(Japan) K Masuda (Japan) T Ōtsuka	13	12
(Indonesia) E Hian (Indonesia) R Sukmawan	15	21
Q1	(Malaysia) Ong S H (Malaysia) Tan B S	21	23
6	(South Korea) Hwang J-m (South Korea) Lee J-j	21	21
(China) Shen Y (China) Xu C	18	19
(Poland) M Łogosz (Poland) R Mateusiak	22	21
(Indonesia) H A Gunawan (Indonesia) J Riyadi	20	13

Second Round
1	(China) Cai Y (China) Fu HF	18	21	21
Q1	(Malaysia) Ong S H (Malaysia) Tan B S	21	14	10
6	(South Korea) Hwang J-m (South Korea) Lee J-j	19	12
(Poland) M Łogosz (Poland) R Mateusiak	21	21

Quarter-finals
1	(China) Cai Y (China) Fu HF	21	21
(Poland) M Łogosz (Poland) R Mateusiak	11	14

==== Section 2 ====
First Round
4	(South Korea) Jung J-s (South Korea) Lee Y-d	21	21
(Denmark) A Kristiansen (Denmark) S Mollyhus	18	10
(Malaysia) R Lin W F (Malaysia) M F Mohd Tazari	15	21	21
Q4	(United States) H Bach (United States) K Malaythong	21	16	13
5	(United States) T Gunawan (Indonesia) C Wijaya	22	21
PFQ	(Germany) K Hopp (Germany) I Kindervater	20	12
(China) Guo ZD (China) He HB	21	21
PFQ	(Australia) R Smith (Australia) G Warfe	15	17

Second Round
4	(South Korea) Jung J-s (South Korea) Lee Y-d	21	21
(Malaysia) R Lin W F (Malaysia) M F Mohd Tazari	11	18
5	(United States) T Gunawan (Indonesia) C Wijaya	13	21	21
(China) Guo ZD (China) He HB	21	18	13

Quarter-finals
4	(South Korea) Jung J-s (South Korea) Lee Y-d	18	21
5	(United States) T Gunawan (Indonesia) C Wijaya	21	23

=== Bottom half ===
==== Section 3 ====
First Round
(Indonesia) L Hadiyanto (Indonesia) A Yulianto	21	21
(Hong Kong) A S Njoto (Hong Kong) Y H Wiratama	18	11
(Indonesia) S Budiarto (Indonesia) F Kurniawan	21	18
8	(Malaysia) Koo K K (Malaysia) Tan B H	23	21
PFQ	(South Korea) Han S-h (South Korea) Yoo Y-s	21	21
Q2	(Japan) K Kawaguchi (Japan) N Kawamae	17	14
(Denmark) L Paaske (Denmark) J Rasmussen	22	15	14
3	(Indonesia) M Kido (Indonesia) H Setiawan	20	21	21

Second Round
(Indonesia) L Hadiyanto (Indonesia) A Yulianto	20	15
8	(Malaysia) Koo K K (Malaysia) Tan B H	22	21
PFQ	(South Korea) Han S-h (South Korea) Yoo Y-s	22	21
3	(Indonesia) M Kido (Indonesia) H Setiawan	20	19

Quarter-finals
8	(Malaysia) Koo K K (Malaysia) Tan B H	21	23
PFQ	(South Korea) Han S-h (South Korea) Yoo Y-s	17	21

==== Section 4 ====
First Round
(Wales) M Hughes (Wales) M Lewis	13	19
Q3	(Denmark) R Andersen (Denmark) P Steffensen	21	21
(England) R Blair (England) A Clark	21	11	16
7	(Malaysia) Choong T F (Malaysia) Lee W W	15	21	21
(Malaysia) M Z Abdul Latif (Malaysia) Gan T C	21	21
(Germany) M Fuchs (Germany) R Spitko	16	13
(Singapore) H Saputra (Singapore) H Wijaya	15	21	26
2	(Denmark) J Eriksen (Denmark) M Lundgaard Hansen	21	12	28

Second Round
Q3	(Denmark) R Andersen (Denmark) P Steffensen	17	11
7	(Malaysia) Choong T F (Malaysia) Lee W W	21	21
(Malaysia) M Z Abdul Latif (Malaysia) Gan T C	17	20
2	(Denmark) J Eriksen (Denmark) M Lundgaard Hansen	21	22

Quarter-finals
7	(Malaysia) Choong T F (Malaysia) Lee W W	21	18	14
2	(Denmark) J Eriksen (Denmark) M Lundgaard Hansen	14	21	21

== Women's doubles ==
=== Seeds ===
1. (China) Gao Ling / Huang Sui (semi-finals)
2. (China) Yang Wei / Zhang Jiewen (final)
3. (China) Wei Yili / Zhang Yawen (champions)
4. (Chinese Taipei) Cheng Wen-hsing / Chien Yu-chin (quarter-finals)
5. (Malaysia) Chin Eei Hui / Wong Pei Tty (semi-finals)
6. (China) Du Jing / Yu Yang (quarter-finals)
7. (Singapore) Jiang Yanmei / Li Yujia (first round)
8. (England) Gail Emms / Donna Kellogg (second round)

=== Finals ===
Semi-finals
1	(China) Gao Ling (China) Huang Sui	9	21	14
3	(China) Wei Yili (China) Zhang Yawen	21	19	21
5	(Malaysia) Chin Eei Hui (Malaysia) Wong Pei Tty	17	7
2	(China) Yang Wei (China) Zhang Jiewen	21	21

Final
3	(China) Wei Yili (China) Zhang Yawen	21	8	24
2	(China) Yang Wei (China) Zhang Jiewen	16	21	22

=== Top half ===
==== Section 1 ====
First Round
1	(China) Gao L (China) Huang S	21	21
(England) N Munt (England) J Nocholas	16	11
(Russia) V Sorokina (Russia) N Vislova	20	10
(Japan) M Maeda (Japan) S Suetsuna	22	21
7	(Singapore) Jiang YM (Singapore) Li YJ	21	21	23
(Malaysia) Lim P S (Malaysia) J Quay	23	17	25
Q2	(Sweden) S Hansson (Sweden) E Lennartsson	16	18
(Poland) K Augustyn (Poland) N Kostiuczyk	21	21

Second Round
1	(China) Gao L (China) Huang S	21	15	21
(Japan) M Maeda (Japan) S Suetsuna	19	21	8
(Malaysia) Lim P S (Malaysia) J Quay	18	17
(Poland) K Augustyn (Poland) N Kostiuczyk	21	21

Quarter-finals
1	(China) Gao L (China) Huang S	21	21
(Poland) K Augustyn (Poland) N Kostiuczyk	12	12

==== Section 2 ====
First Round
3	(China) Wei YL (China) Zhang YW	21	21
(Thailand) D Aroonkesorn (Thailand) K Voravichitchaikul	7	9
Q3	(Scotland) I Bankier (Scotland) E Mason	21	21
(Japan) A Akao (Japan) T Matsuda	18	14
8	(England) G Emms (England) D Kellogg	23	21
(Indonesia) R Mundiasti (Indonesia) E Nursugianti	21	13
(Indonesia) V Marissa (Indonesia) G Polii	21	7	21
(India) J Gutta (Indonesia) S Kurien	16	21	10

Second Round
3	(China) Wei YL (China) Zhang YW	21	21
Q3	(Scotland) I Bankier (Scotland) E Mason	9	9
8	(England) G Emms (England) D Kellogg	18	18
(Indonesia) V Marissa (Indonesia) G Polii	21	21

Quarter-finals
3	(China) Wei YL (China) Zhang YW	21	21
(Indonesia) V Marissa (Indonesia) G Polii	16	12

=== Bottom half ===
==== Section 3 ====
First Round
(Bulgaria) D Dimova (Bulgaria) P Nedelcheva	16	13
(Russia) E Ananina (Russia) A Russkikh	21	21
(South Korea) Hong S-j (South Korea) Kim M-j	12	15
5	(Malaysia) Chin E H (Malaysia) Wong P T	21	21
Q1	(Malaysia) Haw C H (Malaysia) Lim Y L	27	21
PFQ	(Canada) F McKee (Canada) C Reid	25	12
(Denmark) L Frier Kristiansen (Denmark) K R Juhl	11	14
4	(Chinese Taipei) Cheng W-h (Chinese Taipei) Chien Y-c	21	21

Second Round
(Russia) E Ananina (Russia) A Russkikh	12	15
5	(Malaysia) Wong P T (Malaysia) Chin E H	21	21
Q1	(Malaysia) Haw C H (Malaysia) Lim Y L	17	9
4	(Chinese Taipei) Cheng W-h (Chinese Taipei) Chien Y-c	21	21

Quarter-finals
5	(Malaysia) Chin E H (Malaysia) Wong P T	21	21
4	(Chinese Taipei) Cheng W-h (Chinese Taipei) Chien Y-c	12	18

==== Section 4 ====
First Round
Q4	(Sweden) E Bergblom (Sweden) J Persson	8	17
(South Korea) Hwang Y-m (South Korea) Jung Y-k	21	21
(South Korea) Lee H-j (South Korea) Lee K-w	12	26	15
6	(China) Du J (China) Yu Y	21	24	21
(France) É Eymard (France) W Rahmawati	10	11
(Germany) N Grether (Germany) J Schenk	21	21
(Malaysia) Mooi H Y (Malaysia) Ooi Y H	5	10
2	(China) Yang W (China) Zhang JW	21	21

Second Round
(South Korea) Hwang Y-m (South Korea) Jung Y-k	12	10
6	(China) Du J (China) Yu Y	21	21
(Germany) N Grether (Germany) J Schenk	8	11
2	(China) Yang W (China) Zhang JW	21	21

Quarter-finals
6	(China) Du J (China) Yu Y	11	21	20
2	(China) Yang W (China) Zhang JW	21	13	22

== Mixed doubles ==
=== Seeds ===
1. (Indonesia) Nova Widianto / Lilyana Natsir (quarter-finals)
2. (China) Xie Zhongbo / Zhang Yawen (semi-finals)
3. (Denmark) Thomas Laybourn / Kamilla Rytter Juhl (second round)
4. (England) Nathan Robertson / Gail Emms (quarter-finals)
5. (Indonesia) Flandy Limpele / Vita Marissa (second round)
6. (England) Anthony Clark / Donna Kellogg (final)
7. (Poland) Robert Mateusiak / Nadieżda Kostiuczyk (first round)
8. (Singapore) Hendri Saputra / Li Yujia (first round)

=== Finals ===
Semi-finals
(China) He Hanbin (China) Yu Yang	14	14
(China) Zheng Bo (China) Gao Ling	21	21
6	(England) Anthony Clark (England) Donna Kellogg	21	21
2	(China) Xie Zhongbo (China) Zhang Yawen	19	17

Final
(China) Zheng Bo (China) Gao Ling	16	21	21
6	(England) Anthony Clark (England) Donna Kellogg	21	18	14

=== Top half ===
==== Section 1 ====
First Round
1	(Indonesia) N Widianto (Indonesia) L Natsir	21	21
(Chinese Taipei) Hsieh Y-h (Chinese Taipei) Chien Y-c	14	14
(Thailand) S Anugritayawon (Thailand) K Voravichitchaikul	21	20	11
(England) R Middleton (England) L Parker	14	22	21
8	(Singapore) H Saputra (Singapore) Li YJ	21	18
(China) He HB (China) Yu Y	23	21
(South Korea) Lee J-j (South Korea) Lee H-j	21	21
PFQ	(Russia) V Durkin (Russia) V Sorokina	16	13

Second Round
1	(Indonesia) N Widianto (Indonesia) L Natsir	21	21
(England) R Middleton (England) L Parker	16	14
(China) He HB (China) Yu Y	21	23
(South Korea) Lee J-j (South Korea) Lee H-j	10	21

Quarter-finals
1	(Indonesia) N Widianto (Indonesia) L Natsir	16	19
(China) He HB (China) Yu Y	21	21

==== Section 2 ====
First Round
4	(England) N Robertson (England) G Emms	21	21
(Malaysia) Chan P S (Malaysia) Haw C H	7	15
(Russia) A Nikolaenko (Russia) N Vislova	8	9
(New Zealand) D Shirley (Malaysia) J Quay	21	21
7	(Poland) R Mateusiak (Poland) N Kostiuczyk	21	11	10
(China) Zheng B (China) Gao L	16	21	21
(England) K Roebuck (England) N Munt	21	21	21
Q1	(Denmark) R Mangor Anderson (Russia) A Russkikh	23	19	15

Second Round
4	(England) N Robertson (England) G Emms	24	26
(New Zealand) D Shirley (Malaysia) J Quay	22	24
(China) Zheng B (China) Gao L	21	21
(England) K Roebuck (England) N Munt	17	11

Quarter-finals
4	(England) N Robertson (England) G Emms	17	21	21
(China) Zheng B (China) Gao L	21	18	23

=== Bottom half ===
==== Section 3 ====
First Round
(Germany) I Kindervater (Germany) K Piotrowski	22	16	21
Q4	(Denmark) L Paaske (Denmark) M Schjoldager	20	21	14
(France) S Stoyanov (France) É Eymard	21	8	13
6	(England) A Clark (England) D Kellogg	19	21	21
(South Korea) Hwang J-m (South Korea) Jung Y-k	21	21
(Australia) G Warfe (Australia) S Dobson	6	7
(Germany) K Hopp (Germany) B Overzier	18	17
3	(Denmark) T Laybourn (Denmark) K R Juhl	21	21

Second Round
(Germany) I Kindervater (Germany) K Piotrowski	11	11
6	(England) A Clark (England) D Kellogg	21	21
(South Korea) Hwang J-m (South Korea) Jung Y-k	22	21
3	(Denmark) T Laybourn (Denmark) K R Juhl	20	17

Quarter-finals
6	(England) A Clark (England) D Kellogg	21	22	21
(South Korea) Hwang J-m (South Korea) Jung Y-k	17	24	14

==== Section 4 ====
First Round
(South Korea) Lee Y-d (South Korea) Hwang Y-m	21	23
Q3	(Malaysia) Gan T C (Malaysia) Fong C Y	10	21
(Denmark) J Eriksen (Denmark) H Nielsen	30	14	13
5	(Indonesia) F Limpele (Indonesia) V Marissa	29	21	21
(Indonesia) M Rijal (Indonesia) G Polii	21	18	19
Q2	(China) Zhang J (China) Zhao TT	17	21	21
PFQ	(England) D Lindley (England) S Rayappan	10	16
2	(China) Xie ZB (China) Zhang YW	21	21

Second Round
(South Korea) Lee Y-d (South Korea) Hwang Y-m	22	21
5	(Indonesia) F Limpele (Indonesia) V Marissa	20	9
Q2	(China) Zhang J (China) Zhao TT	17	17
2	(China) Xie ZB (China) Zhang YW	21	21

Quarter-finals
(South Korea) Lee Y-d (South Korea) Hwang Y-m	13	10
2	(China) Xie ZB (China) Zhang YW	21	21
