= 2007 Korea Open Super Series =

Tournament details
- Dates: 23 January 2007– 28 January 2007
- Edition: 16th
- Level: Super Series
- Total prize money: US$300,000
- Venue: SK Olympic Handball Gymnasium
- Location: Seoul, South Korea

Champions
- Men's singles: (China) Lin Dan
- Women's singles: (China) Xie Xingfang
- Men's doubles: (South Korea) Jung Jae-sung (South Korea) Lee Yong-dae
- Women's doubles: (China) Gao Ling (China) Huang Sui
- Mixed doubles: (China) Zheng Bo (China) Gao Ling

The 2007 Korea Open Super Series (officially known as the Yonex Korea Open Super Series 2007 for sponsorship reasons) was a badminton tournament which took place at SK Olympic Handball Gymnasium in Seoul, South Korea, from 23 to 28 January 2007 and had a total purse of $300,000.

== Tournament ==
The 2007 Korea Open Super Series was the second tournament of the 2007 BWF Super Series and also part of the Korea Open championships, which had been held since 1991.

=== Venue ===
This international tournament was held at SK Olympic Handball Gymnasium in Seoul, South Korea.

=== Point distribution ===
Below is the point distribution for each phase of the tournament based on the BWF points system for the BWF Super Series event.

Winner	Runner-up	3/4	5/8	9/16	17/32	33/64	65/128	129/256
9,200	7,800	6,420	5,040	3,600	2,220	880	430	170

=== Prize money ===
The total prize money for this tournament was US$300,000. Distribution of prize money was in accordance with BWF regulations.

Event	Winner	Finalist	Semi-finals	Quarter-finals	Last 16
Men's singles	$24,000	$12,000	$6,000	$3,000	$1,200
Women's singles	$20,700	$9,900	$5,400	$2,700	—N/a
Men's doubles	$21,600	$12,000	$7,200	$4,200	—N/a
Women's doubles	$18,300	$12,000	$6,600	$3,300	—N/a
Mixed doubles	$18,300	$12,000	$6,600	$3,300	—N/a

== Men's singles ==
=== Seeds ===
1. (China) Lin Dan (champion)
2. (Malaysia) Lee Chong Wei (quarter-finals)
3. (China) Chen Hong (first round)
4. (Denmark) Peter Gade (withdrew)
5. (China) Bao Chunlai (semi-finals)
6. (China) Chen Jin (final)
7. (Denmark) Kenneth Jonassen (first round)
8. (South Korea) Lee Hyun-il (first round)

=== Finals ===
Semi-finals
1	(China) Lin Dan	21	14	21
5/8	(China) Bao Chunlai	12	21	10
(Malaysia) Muhammad Hafiz Hashim	9	21	11
5/8	(China) Chen Jin	21	19	21

Final
1	(China) Lin Dan	21	21
5/8	(China) Chen Jin	14	19

=== Top half ===
==== Section 1 ====
First round
1	(China) Lin D	21	21
(Singapore) K Lee Y H	14	16
(Poland) P Wacha	18	21	21
(Germany) B Joppien	21	17	16
5/8	(Denmark) K Jonassen	18	21	20
(Malaysia) R Hashim	21	13	22
(Netherlands) E Pang	16	19
Q1	(Germany) R Spitko	21	21

Second round
1	(China) Lin D	21	21
(Poland) P Wacha	14	15
(Malaysia) R Hashim	21	21
Q1	(Germany) R Spitko	17	7

Quarter-finals
1	(China) Lin D	21	21
(Malaysia) R Hashim	18	15

==== Section 2 ====
First round
3/4	(Denmark) P Gade
(China) Chen Y	w	/	o
(Malaysia) Yeoh K B	21	21	21
(Denmark) K Ødum	23	8	14
5/8	(China) Bao CL	21	21
(South Korea) Park S-h	9	14
(Hong Kong) Chan Y K	18	14
Q2	(South Korea) Shon S-m	21	21

Second round
(China) Chen Y	19	21	21
(Malaysia) Yeoh K B	21	12	13
5/8	(China) Bao CL	21	21
Q2	(South Korea) Shon S-m	10	13

Quarter-finals
(China) Chen Y	22	13	15
5/8	(China) Bao CL	20	21	21

=== Bottom half ===
==== Section 3 ====
First round
(Malaysia) Kuan B H	12	16
Q4	(Indonesia) S D Kuncoro	21	21
(Malaysia) Lee T S	21	21
5/8	(South Korea) Lee H-i	17	8
(Hong Kong) Ng W	21	25
Q3	(South Korea) Kim I-w	16	23
(Malaysia) M H Hashim	21	9	21
3/4	(China) Chen H	15	21	18

Second round
Q4	(Indonesia) S D Kuncoro	17	21	21
(Malaysia) Lee T S	21	18	18
(Hong Kong) Ng W	9	18
(Malaysia) M H Hashim	21	21

Quarter-finals
Q4	(Indonesia) S D Kuncoro	16	21	21
(Malaysia) M H Hashim	21	13	23

==== Section 4 ====
First round
PFQ	(New Zealand) J Moody	6	13
(Netherlands) D Palyama	21	21
(Wales) R Vaughan	10	14
5/8	(China) Chen J	21	'21
(England) A Smith	21	19	19
(Japan) S Satō	12	21	21
(Thailand) B Ponsana	21	15	13
2	(Malaysia) Lee C W	18	21	21

Second round
(Netherlands) D Palyama	16	12
5/8	(China) Chen J	21	21
(Japan) S Satō	22	7	13
2	(Malaysia) Lee C W	20	21	21

Quarter-finals
5/8	(China) Chen J	14	21	21
2	(Malaysia) Lee C W	21	15	16

== Women's singles ==
=== Seeds ===
1. (China) Zhang Ning (withdrew)
2. (China) Xie Xingfang (champion)
3. (Hong Kong) Wang Chen (second round)
4. (Germany) Huaiwen Xu (quarter-finals)
5. (China) Lu Lan (semi-finals)
6. (France) Pi Hongyan (first round)
7. (Netherlands) Yao Jie (second round)
8. (China) Zhu Lin (final)

=== Finals ===
Semi-finals
(Bulgaria) Petya Nedelcheva	9	16
5/8	(China) Zhu Lin	21	21
5/8	(China) Lu Lan	21	12	21
2	(China) Xie Xingfang	17	21	23

Final
5/8	(China) Zhu Lin	14	7
2	(China) Xie Xingfang	21	21

=== Top half ===
==== Section 1 ====
First round
PFQ	(Indonesia) M K Yulianti	21	20
(Australia) Huang C-c	23	21
Q4	(South Korea) Lee H-j	21	21
(New Zealand) R Hindley	11	12
5/8	(France) Pi HY	17	21	16
(Malaysia) J Wong P X	21	15	21
Q2	(South Korea) Lee Y-h	21	15	21
(Bulgaria) P Nedelcheva	5	21	23

Second round
(Australia) Huang C-c	21	22
Q4	(South Korea) Lee H-j	17	20
(Malaysia) J Wong P X	19	10
(Bulgaria) P Nedelcheva	21	21

Quarter-finals
(Australia) Huang C-c	16	21	13
(Bulgaria) P Nedelcheva	21	13	21

==== Section 2 ====
First round
3/4	(Germany) HW Xu	21	21
(Singapore) Li L	13	13
(Hong Kong) Yip P Y	9	21	19
(Germany) J Schenk	21	13	21
5/8	(China) Zhu L	21	21
(Canada) A Rice	11	2
(Denmark) T Rasmussen	21	21
(Scotland) S Hughes	16	12

Second round
3/4	(Germany) HW Xu	21	21
(Germany) J Schenk	18	12
5/8	(China) Zhu L	21	21
(Denmark) T Rasmussen	17	10

Quarter-finals
3/4	(Germany) HW Xu	11	13
5/8	(China) Zhu L	21	21

=== Bottom half ===
==== Section 3 ====
First round
(Japan) K Mori	9	13
(Malaysia) Wong M C	21	21
(Japan) E Hirose	16	21	14
5/8	(China) Lu L	21	15	21
Q1	(South Korea) Seo Y-h	21	21
PFQ	(Chinese Taipei) Pai M-j	12	19
(China) Wang L	15	12
3/4	(Hong Kong) Wang C	21	21

Second round
(Malaysia) Wong M C	14	4
5/8	(China) Lu L	21	21
Q1	(South Korea) Seo Y-h	15	21	21
3/4	(Hong Kong) Wang C	18	11

Quarter-finals
5/8	(China) Lu L	21	21
Q1	(South Korea) Seo Y-h	16	11

==== Section 4 ====
First round
(Japan) Y Hirayama	20	15
(Russia) E Karachkova	22	21
(Finland) A Nieminen	13	15
5/8	(Netherlands) Yao J	21	21
Q3	(Singapore) Xing AY	21	23	18
(Netherlands) J Meulendijks	15	25	21
(South Korea) Hwang Y-h	21	7	5
2	(China) Xie XF	18	21	21

Second round
(Russia) E Karachkova	16	25	21
5/8	(Netherlands) Yao J	21	23	7
(Netherlands) J Meulendijks	16	14
2	(China) Xie XF	21	21

Quarter-finals
(Russia) E Karachkova	14	5
2	(China) Xie XF	21	21

== Men's doubles ==
=== Seeds ===
1. (China) Fu Haifeng / Cai Yun (quarter-finals)
2. (Denmark) Jens Eriksen / Martin Lundgaard Hansen (quarter-finals)
3. (Malaysia) Choong Tan Fook / Lee Wan Wah (quarter-finals)
4. (South Korea) Jung Jae-sung / Lee Yong-dae (champions)
5. (England) Anthony Clark / Robert Blair (second round)
6. (Indonesia) Markis Kido / Hendra Setiawan (quarter-finals)
7. (South Korea) Lee Jae-jin / Hwang Ji-man (final)
8. (United States) Tony Gunawan / (Indonesia) Chandra Wijaya (semi-finals)

=== Finals ===
Semi-finals
5/8	(United States) Tony Gunawan (Indonesia) Candra Wijaya	23	16	12
3/4	(South Korea) Jung Jae-sung (South Korea) Lee Yong-dae	21	21	21
Q1	(Malaysia) Koo Kien Keat (Malaysia) Tan Boon Heong	10	18
5/8	(South Korea) Lee Jae-jin (South Korea) Hwang Ji-man	21	21

Final
3/4	(South Korea) Jung Jae-sung (South Korea) Lee Yong-dae	21	21
5/8	(South Korea) Lee Jae-jin (South Korea) Hwang Ji-man	16	15

=== Top half ===
==== Section 1 ====
First round
1	(China) Fu HF (China) Cai Y	22	21
(Japan) S Sakamoto (Japan) S Ikeda	20	13
(China) Shen Y (China) He HB	21	16	13
(Indonesia) H A Gunawan (Indonesia) J Riyadi	19	21	21
5/8	(United States) T Gunawan (Indonesia) C Wijaya	15	21	21
(Denmark) L Paaske (Denmark) J Rasmussen	21	17	14
Q4	(South Korea) Han S-h (South Korea) Cho G-w	21	19	21
(Malaysia) Chan C M (Malaysia) Hoon T H	13	21	14

Second round
1	(China) Fu HF (China) Cai Y	21	21
(Indonesia) H A Gunawan (Indonesia) J Riyadi	19	13
5/8	(United States) T Gunawan (Indonesia) C Wijaya	21	21
Q4	(South Korea) Han S-h (South Korea) Cho G-w	16	10

Quarter-finals
1	(China) Fu HF (China) Cai Y	19	19
5/8	(United States) T Gunawan (Indonesia) C Wijaya	21	21

==== Section 2 ====
First round
3/4	(South Korea) Jung J-s (South Korea) Lee Y-d	21	21
(Hong Kong) A S Njoto (Hong Kong) Y H Wiratama	16	14
PFQ	(Germany) K Hopp (Germany) I Kindervater	14	11
(Singapore) H Saputra (Singapore) H Wijaya	21	21
5/8	(Indonesia) M Kido (Indonesia) H Setiawan	21	21
(France) S Stoyanov (France) M Popov	9	14
(Denmark) S Mollyhus (Denmark) A Kristiansen	21	21
PFQ	(Australia) G Warfe (Australia) R Smith	10	7

Second round
3/4	(South Korea) Jung J-s (South Korea) Lee Y-d	21	21
(Singapore) H Saputra (Singapore) H Wijaya	18	10
5/8	(Indonesia) M Kido (Indonesia) H Setiawan	21	21
(Denmark) S Mollyhus (Denmark) A Kristiansen	17	15

Quarter-finals
3/4	(South Korea) Jung J-s (South Korea) Lee Y-d	21	21
5/8	(Indonesia) M Kido (Indonesia) H Setiawan	12	16

=== Bottom half ===
==== Section 3 ====
First round
Q1	(Malaysia) Koo K K (Malaysia) Tan B H	21	18	21
(Germany) R Spitko (Germany) M Fuchs	9	21	10
(Indonesia) R Sukmawan (Indonesia) E Hian	15	21	13
5/8	(England) A Clark (England) R Blair	21	18	21
Q3	(Malaysia) Chew C E (Malaysia) Hong C H	20	22
(Thailand) S Prapakamol (Thailand) P Ngernsrisuk	22	24
(Australia) A Brehaut (Australia) A B Sindoro	9	12
3/4	(Malaysia) Choong T F (Malaysia) Lee W W'	21	21

Second round
Q1	(Malaysia) Koo K K (Malaysia) Tan B H	18	21	21
5/8	(England) A Clark (England) R Blair	21	18	18
(Thailand) S Prapakamol (Thailand) P Ngernsrisuk	9	23	8
3/4	(Malaysia) Choong T F (Malaysia) Lee W W	21	21	21

Quarter-finals
Q1	(Malaysia) Koo K K (Malaysia) Tan B H	21	0
3/4	(Malaysia) Choong T F (Malaysia) Lee W W	19	0^{r}

==== Section 4 ====
First round
(Malaysia) M F Mohd Tazari (Malaysia) R Lin W F	15	8
(Poland) M Łogosz (Poland) R Mateusiak	21	21
(Denmark) M Boe (Denmark) J Fischer Nielsen	12	21	18
5/8	(South Korea) Lee J-j (South Korea) Hwang J-m	21	16	21
Q2	(Malaysia) Tan B S (Malaysia) Ong S H	21	19	21
(Malaysia) Gan T C (Malaysia) M Z Abdul Latif	19	21	14
(Japan) T Ōtsuka (Japan) K Masuda	21	18	18
2	(Denmark) J Eriksen (Denmark) M Lundgaard Hansen	17	21	21

Second round
(Poland) M Łogosz (Poland) R Mateusiak	16	14
5/8	(South Korea) Lee J-j (South Korea) Hwang J-m	21	21
Q2	(Malaysia) Tan B S (Malaysia) Ong S H	18	11
2	(Denmark) J Eriksen (Denmark) M Lundgaard Hansen	21	21

Quarter-finals
5/8	(South Korea) Lee J-j (South Korea) Hwang J-m	21	21
2	(Denmark) J Eriksen (Denmark) M Lundgaard Hansen	12	13

== Women's doubles ==
=== Seeds ===
1. (China) Gao Ling / Huang Sui (champions)
2. (China) Yang Wei / Zhang Jiewen (final)
3. (South Korea) Lee Kyung-won / Lee Hyo-jung (semi-finals)
4. (China) Zhang Yawen / Wei Yili (semi-finals)
5. (China) Du Jing / Zhao Tingting (quarter-finals)
6. (England) Gail Emms / Donna Kellogg (first round)
7. (Indonesia) Endang Nursugianti / Rani Mundiasti (second round)
8. (Malaysia) Wong Pei Tty / Chin Eei Hui (first round)

=== Finals ===
Semi-finals
1	(China) Gao Ling (China) Huang Sui	21	21
3/4	(South Korea) Lee Kyung-won (South Korea) Lee Hyo-jung	19	13
3/4	(China) Zhang Yawen (China) Wei Yili	21	24	10
2	(China) Yang Wei (China) Zhang Jiewen	23	22	21

Final
1	(China) Gao Ling (China) Huang Sui	12	21	21
2	(China) Yang Wei (China) Zhang Jiewen	21	14	16

=== Top half ===
==== Section 1 ====
First round
(Germany) N Grether (Germany) J Schenk	21	21
(France) É Eymard (France) W Rahmawati	18	15
5/8	(Indonesia) E Nursugianti (Indonesia) R Mundiasti	21	21
(Canada) F McKee (Canada) C Reid	15	16
(South Korea) Jung Y-k (South Korea) Hong S-j	21	21
(Malaysia) Mooi H Y (Malaysia) Ooi Y H	14	15

Second round
1	(China) Gao L (China) Huang S	w	/	o
(Germany) N Grether (Germany) J Schenk
(Indonesia) E Nursugianti (Indonesia) R Mundiasti	13	17
(South Korea) Jung Y-k (South Korea) Hong S-j	21	21

Quarter-finals
1	(China) Gao L (China) Huang S	21	21
(South Korea) Jung Y-k (South Korea) Hong S-j	11	15

==== Section 2 ====
First round
(Russia) A Russkikh (Russia) E Ananina	15	14
(Japan) M Maeda (Japan) S Suetsuna	21	21
5/8	(Malaysia) Wong P T (Malaysia) Chin E H	15	13
(Japan) K Ogura (Japan) R Shiota	21	21
(Poland) K Augustyn (Poland) N Kostiuczyk	21	21
(England) S Rayappan (England) J Wallwork	14	14

Second round
3/4	(South Korea) Lee K-w (South Korea) Lee H-j	21	21
(Japan) M Maeda (Japan) S Suetsuna	18	12
(Japan) K Ogura (Japan) R Shiota	21	14	13
(Poland) K Augustyn (Poland) N Kostiuczyk	18	21	21

Quarter-finals
3/4	(South Korea) Lee K-w (South Korea) Lee H-j	21	21
(Poland) K Augustyn (Poland) N Kostiuczyk	8	7

=== Bottom half ===
==== Section 3 ====
First round
(Indonesia) G Polii (Indonesia) V Marissa	17	21	23
(England) J Nicholas (England) N Munt	21	13	21
(Japan) A Akao (Japan) T Matsuda	21	21
5/8	(England) G Emms (England) D Kellogg	14	18
(South Korea) Kim M-j (South Korea) Jung K-e	21	21
(Malaysia) Fong C Y (Malaysia) See P L	17	18

Second round
(Indonesia) G Polii (Indonesia) V Marissa	21	11	10
(Japan) A Akao (Japan) T Matsuda	19	21	21
(South Korea) Kim M-j (South Korea) Jung K-e	9	10
3/4	(China) Zhang YW (China) Wei YL	21	21

Quarter-finals
(Japan) A Akao (Japan) T Matsuda	11	21	13
3/4	(China) Zhang YW (China) Wei YL	21	18	21

==== Section 4 ====
First round
(South Korea) Ha J-e (South Korea) Hwang Y-m	23	21
(Denmark) L Frier Kristiansen (Denmark) K Rytter Juhl	21	8
(Bulgaria) P Nedelcheva (Bulgaria) D Dimova	7	9
5/8	(China) Du J (China) Zhao TT	21	21
(Singapore) Jiang YM (Singapore) Li YJ	21	21
(Hong Kong) Wong M C (Hong Kong) Chau H W	9	11

Second round
(South Korea) Ha J-e (South Korea) Hwang Y-m	18	18
5/8	(China) Du J (China) Zhao TT	21	21
(Singapore) Jiang YM (Singapore) Li YJ	10	11
2	(China) Yang W (China) Zhang JW	21	21

Quarter-finals
5/8	(China) Du J (China) Zhao TT	10	16
2	(China) Yang W (China) Zhang JW	21	21

== Mixed doubles ==
=== Seeds ===
1. (Indonesia) Nova Widianto / Lilyana Natsir (second round)
2. (Thailand) Sudket Prapakamol / Saralee Thungthongkam (quarter-finals)
3. (England) Anthony Clark / Donna Kellogg (second round)
4. (China) Xie Zhongbo / Zhang Yawen (semi-finals)
5. (England) Nathan Robertson / Gail Emms (semi-finals)
6. (China) Zheng Bo / Gao Ling (champions)
7. (Denmark) Thomas Laybourn / Kamilla Rytter Juhl (final)
8. (China) Zhang Jun / Zhao Tingting (first round)

=== Finals ===
Semi-finals
5/8	(China) Zheng Bo (China) Gao Ling	21	21
3/4	(China) Zhang Yawen (China) Xie Zhongbo	16	16
5/8	(Denmark) Thomas Laybourn (Denmark) Kamilla Rytter Juhl	21	12	21
5/8	(England) Nathan Robertson (England) Gail Emms	19	21	16

Final
5/8	(China) Zheng Bo (China) Gao Ling	22	21
5/8	(Denmark) Thomas Laybourn (Denmark) Kamilla Rytter Juhl	20	19

=== Top half ===
==== Section 1 ====
First round
1	(Indonesia) N Widianto (Indonesia) L Natsir	18	21	21
(Germany) I Kindervater (Germany) K Piotrowski	21	17	4
(Indonesia) T P Alroy (Hong Kong) Koon W C	18	9
(England) D Lindley (England) S Rayappan	21	21
5/8	(China) Zheng B (China) Gao L	21	21
(South Korea) Lee Y-d (South Korea) Hwang Y-m	7	5
Q3	(Japan) T Ōtsuka (Japan) S Suetsuna	19	17
(Denmark) J Rasmussen (Denmark) L Frier Kristiansen	21	21

Second round
1	(Indonesia) N Widianto (Indonesia) L Natsir	17	21	20
(England) D Lindley (England) S Rayappan	21	11	22
5/8	(China) Zheng B (China) Gao L	21	21
(Denmark) J Rasmussen (Denmark) L Frier Kristiansen	11	10

Quarter-finals
(England) D Lindley (England) S Rayappan	12	11
5/8	(China) Zheng B (China) Gao L	21	21

==== Section 2 ====
First round
3/4	(China) Zhang YW (China) Xie ZB	21	18	21
(Poland) M Łogosz (England) N Munt	13	21	14
Q2	(Japan) K Masuda (Japan) M Maeda	21	21
(South Korea) Hwang J-m (South Korea) Jung Y-k	19	16
5/8	(China) Zhang J (China) Zhao TT	21	17	15
(Malaysia) Koo K K (Malaysia) Wong P T	13	21	21
(South Korea) Jeon J-b (South Korea) Kim M-j	21	21
(Denmark) L Paaske (Denmark) M Schjoldager	13	19

Second round
3/4	(China) Zhang YW (China) Xie ZB	21	21
Q2	(Japan) K Masuda (Japan) M Maeda	13	4
(Malaysia) Koo K K (Malaysia) Wong P T	21	21
(South Korea) Jeon J-b (South Korea) Kim M-j	18	16

Quarter-finals
3/4	(China) Zhang YW (China) Xie ZB	22	21
(Malaysia) Koo K K (Malaysia) Wong P T	20	15

=== Bottom half ===
==== Section 3 ====
First round
Q4	(Singapore) H Wijaya (Singapore) Jiang YM	22	19
(Indonesia) M Rijal (Indonesia) G Polii	24	21
(Philippines) Kennevic Asuncion (Philippines) Kennie Asuncion	10	17
5/8	(Denmark) T Laybourn (Denmark) K Rytter Juhl	21	21
Q1	(Denmark) J Fischer Nielsen (Denmark) B Andersen	21	17	21
(England) R Blair (England) J Wallwork	10	21	12
(Poland) R Mateusiak (Poland) N Kostiuczyk	21	19	20
3/4	(England) A Clark (England) D Kellogg	14	21	22

Second round
(Indonesia) M Rijal (Indonesia) G Polii	21	22	11
5/8	(Denmark) T Laybourn (Denmark) K Rytter Juhl	17	24	21
Q1	(Denmark) J Fischer Nielsen (Denmark) B Andersen	21	22
3/4	(England) A Clark (England) D Kellogg	15	20

Quarter-finals
5/8	(Denmark) T Laybourn (Denmark) K Rytter Juhl	21	21
Q1	(Denmark) J Fischer Nielsen (Denmark) B Andersen	13	12

==== Section 4 ====
First round
(Indonesia) F Limpele (Indonesia) V Marissa	21	21	21
(New Zealand) D Shirley (Malaysia) J Quay	23	10	17
(Malaysia) Tan B S (Malaysia) Ooi Y H	5	5
5/8	(England) N Robertson (England) G Emms	21	21
(France) S Stoyanov (France) É Eymard	15	18
(Singapore) H Saputra (Singapore) Li YJ	21	21
(South Korea) Yoo Y-s (South Korea) Ha J-e	17	16
2	(Thailand) S Prapakamol (Thailand) S Thungthongkam	21	21

Second round
(Indonesia) F Limpele (Indonesia) V Marissa	19	15
5/8	(England) N Robertson (England) G Emms	21	21
(Singapore) H Saputra (Singapore) Li YJ	14	13
2	(Thailand) S Prapakamol (Thailand) S Thungthongkam	21	21

Quarter-finals
5/8	(England) N Robertson (England) G Emms	21	21
2	(Thailand) S Prapakamol (Thailand) S Thungthongkam	18	12
