= Kim So-yeon (badminton) =

South Korean badminton player (born 1982)

Personal information
- Born: 21 July 1982 (age 44)

Sport
- Country: South Korea
- Sport: Badminton
- Event: Women's doubles

Women's doubles
- BWF profile
Medal record
Women's badminton
Representing South Korea
Uber Cup
| Bronze medal – third place | 2000 Kuala Lumpur | Women's team |
World Junior Championships
| Silver medal – second place | 2000 Guangzhou | Mixed team |
Asian Junior Championships
| Silver medal – second place | 2000 Kyoto | Girls' team |
| Bronze medal – third place | 2000 Kyoto | Girls' doubles |

Kim So-yeon (Korean: 김소연; born 21 July 1982) is a South Korean badminton player. She was part of the Korean junior team that won the silver medal at the 2000 Asian Junior Championships, and also clinched the bronze medal in the girls' doubles event. Kim who educated at the Sungji Girls' High School, won the 2000 National High School Championships in the mixed doubles event partnered with Lee Jae-jin. Kim later joined the Masan City team, and won the title at the 2006 Gyeongnam Badminton Championship.

== Achievements ==
=== Asian Junior Championships ===
Girls' doubles
| Year | Venue | Partner | Opponent | Score | Result |
|---|---|---|---|---|---|
| 2000 | Nishiyama Park Gymnasium; Kyoto, Japan | (South Korea) Jung Yeon-kyung | (China) Zhang Yawen (China) Li Yujia | 7–15, 2–15 | Bronze |

=== BWF International ===
Women's doubles
| Year | Tournament | Partner | Opponent | Score | Result |
|---|---|---|---|---|---|
| 1999 | Norwegian International | (South Korea) Jung Yeon-kyung | (South Korea) Lee Hyo-jung (South Korea) Yim Kyung-jin | 7–15, 3–15 | (silver) Runner-up |
| 1999 | Hungarian International | (South Korea) Jung Yeon-kyung | (South Korea) Lee Hyo-jung (South Korea) Yim Kyung-jin | 9–15, 13–15 | (silver) Runner-up |
