= Joo Hyun-hee =

South Korean badminton player (born 1982)

Personal information
- Born: 3 January 1982 (age 44)

Sport
- Country: South Korea
- Sport: Badminton
- Event: Women's doubles

Women's doubles
- BWF profile
Medal record
Women's badminton
Representing South Korea
World Junior Championships
Silver medal – second place	2000 Guangzhou	Mixed team
Asian Junior Championships
Silver medal – second place	2000 Kyoto	Girls' team
Bronze medal – third place	2000 Kyoto	Girls' doubles
Bronze medal – third place	1999 Yangon	Girls' doubles
Bronze medal – third place	1999 Yangon	Girls' team

Joo Hyun-hee (Korean: 주현희; born 3 January 1982) is a South Korean badminton player. Joo has joined the Daekyo team when she was in the junior group age. She was part of the Korean girls' team that competed at the 1999 and 2000 Asian Junior Championships, winning the bronze and silver medal respectively. She also won the bronze medal in the girls' doubles event in both competitions. Joo later helped the national junior mixed team won the silver medal at the 2000 World Junior Championships in Guangzhou, China. In the senior international level, she was the runner-up at the 2005 and 2007 Canada International.

== Achievements ==
=== Asian Junior Championships ===
Girls' doubles
Year	Venue	Partner	Opponent	Score	Result
2000	Nishiyama Park Gymnasium; Kyoto, Japan	(South Korea) Hwang Yu-mi	(China) Zhao Tingting (China) Li Yujia	9–15, 5–15	Bronze
1999	National Indoor Stadium – 1 Yangon, Myanmar	(South Korea) Si Jin-sun	(China) Xie Xingfang (China) Zhang Jiewen	17–16, 4–15, 11–15	Bronze

=== BWF International Challenge/Series ===
Women's doubles
Year	Tournament	Partner	Opponent	Score	Result
2007	Canadian International	(South Korea) Oh Seul-ki	(South Korea) Hwang Yu-mi (South Korea) Ha Jung-eun	16–21, 7–21	(silver) Runner-up

Mixed doubles
Year	Tournament	Partner	Opponent	Score	Result
2005	Canadian International	(South Korea) Han Sung-wook	(South Korea) Kang Kyung-jin (South Korea) Ha Jung-eun	12–15, 13–15	(silver) Runner-up

BWF International Challenge tournament
BWF International Series tournament
