= 2000 IBF World Junior Championships =

Tournament details
- Dates: October 25, 2002 - November 3, 2002
- Edition: 5th
- Venue: Tianhe Gymnasium
- Location: Guangzhou, China

The 2000 IBF World Junior Championships was an international badminton tournament held in Guangzhou, China from 3-11 November 2000. China swept all the titles in the team and individual events.

== Team competition ==
A total of 24 countries competed at the first team competition in BWF World Junior Championships.

=== Medalists ===
| Event | Gold | Silver | Bronze |
|---|---|---|---|
| Teams | China; Lin Dan; Zhu Weilun; Bao Chunlai; Sang Yang; Zheng Bo; Xie Zhongbo; Cao Chen; Yu Jin; Wei Yan; Wang Rong; Wei Yili; Zhang Yawen; Li Yujia; Zhao Tingting | South Korea; Jang Young-soo; Hong Seung-ki; Ahn Hyun-suk; Lee Jae-jin; Jung Jae-sung; Hwang Ji-man; Shin Hee-kwang; Jun Jae-youn; Park Hyo-sun; Seo Yoon-hee; Kim Na-rae; Joo Hyun-hee; Hwang Yu-mi; Kim So-yeon; Jung Yeon-kyung | Indonesia; Sony Dwi Kuncoro; Ardi Ardiansah; Taufik Hidayat Akbar; Anggun Nugroho; Hendra Aprida Gunawan; Markis Kido; Yan Piter; Tri Heru Pamungkas; Mona Santoso; Silvi Antarini; Dewi Tira Arisandi; Dian Novita Sari; Lita Nurlita; Endang Nursugianti; Rani Mundiasti; Devi Sukma Wijaya |

=== Final team ranking ===
1. China
2. South Korea
3. Indonesia
4. Chinese Taipei
5. Thailand
6. Germany
7. Japan
8. England
9. Singapore
10. Russia
11. Denmark
12. Australia
13. India
14. Netherlands
15. Italy
16. Sweden
17. Hong Kong
18. France
19. Romania
20. New Zealand
21. Canada
22. Czech Republic
23. South Africa
24. Macau

== Individual competition ==
=== Medalists ===
| Event | Gold | Silver | Bronze |
|---|---|---|---|
| Boys singles | (China) Bao Chunlai | (Indonesia) Sony Dwi Kuncoro | (China) Lin Dan |
| Boys singles | (China) Bao Chunlai | (Indonesia) Sony Dwi Kuncoro | (Malaysia) Lee Chong Wei |
| Girls singles | (China) Wei Yan | (China) Wang Rong | (Chinese Taipei) Chien Yu-Chin |
| Girls singles | (China) Wei Yan | (China) Wang Rong | (China) Yu Jin |
| Boys doubles | (China) Sang Yang and Zheng Bo | (China) Xie Zhongbo and Cao Chen | (Indonesia) Hendra Gunawan and Markis Kido |
| Boys doubles | (China) Sang Yang and Zheng Bo | (China) Xie Zhongbo and Cao Chen | (China) Sun Qi and Jiang Lai |
| Girls doubles | (China) Wei Yili and Zhang Yawen | (China) Li Yujia and Zhao Tingting | (China) Zhou Bingqing and Zhang Lu |
| Girls doubles | (China) Wei Yili and Zhang Yawen | (China) Li Yujia and Zhao Tingting | (China) Wu Ying and Li Yanzhen |
| Mixed doubles | (China) Sang Yang and Zhang Yawen | (China) Zheng Bo and Wei Yili | (Indonesia) Hendra Gunawan and Lita Nurlita |
| Mixed doubles | (China) Sang Yang and Zhang Yawen | (China) Zheng Bo and Wei Yili | (South Korea) Lee Jae-jin and Hwang Yu-mi |

== Results ==
=== Boys' singles ===
Semi-finals
(China) Bao Chunlai | 7 | 7 | 0 | 0 | 7
(China) Lin Dan | 4 | 2 | 7 | 7 | 1
(Malaysia) Lee Chong Wei | 6 | 4 | 4
(Indonesia) Sony Dwi Kuncoro | 8 | 7 | 7

Final
(China) Bao Chunlai | 7 | 7 | 1 | 7
(Indonesia) Sony Dwi Kuncoro | 1 | 5 | 7 | 5

=== Girls' singles ===
Semi-finals
(China) Wei Yan | 7 | 8 | 7
(China) Yu Jin | 2 | 6 | 2
(China) Wang Rong | 7 | 7 | 7
(Chinese Taipei) Chien Yu-chin | 3 | 0 | 0

Final
(China) Wei Yan | 7 | 7 | 7
(China) Wang Rong | 3 | 0 | 2

=== Boys' doubles ===
Semi-finals
(China) Sang Yang (China) Zheng Bo | 7 | 7 | 7
(Indonesia) Hendra Aprida Gunawan (Indonesia) Markis Kido | 4 | 3 | 0
(China) Jiang Lai (China) Sun Qi | 3 | 3 | 7 | 1
(China) Cao Chen (China) Xie Zhongbo | 7 | 7 | 3 | 7

Final
(China) Sang Yang (China) Zheng Bo | 7 | 7 | 2 | 7
(China) Cao Chen (China) Xie Zhongbo | 5 | 5 | 7 | 5

=== Girls' doubles ===
Semi-finals
(China) Wei Yili (China) Zhang Yawen | 7 | 7 | 7
(China) Zhang Lu (China) Zhou Bingqing | 1 | 1 | 3
(China) Li Yanzhen (China) Wu Ying | 2 | 4 | 0
(China) Li Yujia (China) Zhao Tingting | 7 | 7 | 7

Final
(China) Wei Yili (China) Zhang Yawen | 4 | 7 | 7 | 7
(China) Li Yujia (China) Zhao Tingting | 7 | 2 | 0 | 1

=== Mixed doubles ===
Semi-finals
(China) Sang Yang (China) Zhang Yawen | 7 | 7 | 7 | 7
(Indonesia) Hendra Aprida Gunawan (Indonesia) Lita Nurlita | 8 | 3 | 0 | 4
(South Korea) Lee Jae-jin (South Korea) Hwang Yu-mi | 4 | 4 | 0
(China) Zheng Bo (China) Wei Yili | 7 | 7 | 7

Final
(China) Sang Yang (China) Zhang Yawen | 7 | 7 | 8
(China) Zheng Bo (China) Wei Yili | 3 | 0 | 6

== Medal account ==
| Pos | Country | Gold | Silver | Bronze | Total |
|---|---|---|---|---|---|
| 1 | China | 6 | 4 | 5 | 15 |
| 2 | Indonesia | 0 | 1 | 3 | 4 |
| 3 | South Korea | 0 | 1 | 1 | 2 |
| 4 | Chinese Taipei | 0 | 0 | 1 | 1 |
| 4 | Malaysia | 0 | 0 | 1 | 1 |
