= Jang Young-soo =

South Korean badminton player (born 1982)

Personal information
- Born: 21 August 1982 (age 43)
- Height: 1.83 m (6 ft 0 in)

Sport
- Country: South Korea
- Sport: Badminton
- Event: Men's singles

Men's singles
- BWF profile
Medal record
Men's badminton
Representing South Korea
Sudirman Cup
Silver medal – second place	2009 Guangzhou	Mixed team
Bronze medal – third place	2005 Beijing	Mixed team
Asian Games
Gold medal – first place	2002 Busan	Men's team
World Junior Championships
Silver medal – second place	2000 Guangzhou	Mixed team
Asian Junior Championships
Bronze medal – third place	2000 Kyoto	Boys' team

Jang Young-soo (Korean: 장영수; born 21 August 1982) is a South Korean badminton player. He was the gold medalists at the 2002 Busan Asian Games. Jang who educated at the Inha University won the men's singles title at the Summer National Championships in 2003. He later won the 51st and 55th National Championships men's singles title. He won his first international title at the 2003 Hungarian International tournament. In December 2018, Jang who is a trainer in Gimcheon city, was appointed as a South Korea national coach.

== Achievements ==
=== IBF International ===
Men's singles

Year	Tournament	Opponent	Score	Result
2003	Hungarian International	(Sweden) Per-Henrik Croona	7–15, 15–10, 15–8	(gold) Winner
