= Zheng Bo =

Chinese badminton player

Zheng Bo 郑波
Personal information
- Born: 26 November 1983 (age 42) Hunan, China
- Height: 1.78 m (5 ft 10 in)
- Weight: 80 kg (176 lb)

Sport
- Country: China
- Sport: Badminton
- Handedness: Right

Men's & mixed doubles
- Highest ranking: 1 (XD with Ma Jin)
- BWF profile
Medal record
Men's badminton
Representing China
World Championships
Gold medal – first place	2010 Paris	Mixed doubles
Silver medal – second place	2007 Kuala Lumpur	Mixed doubles
Bronze medal – third place	2003 Birmingham	Men's doubles
World Cup
Bronze medal – third place	2006 Yiyang	Mixed doubles
Sudirman Cup
Gold medal – first place	2005 Beijing	Mixed team
Gold medal – first place	2007 Glasgow	Mixed team
Gold medal – first place	2009 Guangzhou	Mixed team
Thomas Cup
Gold medal – first place	2004 Jakarta	Men's team
Gold medal – first place	2006 Sendai & Tokyo	Men's team
Asian Games
Gold medal – first place	2006 Doha	Mixed doubles
Gold medal – first place	2006 Doha	Men's team
World Junior Championships
Gold medal – first place	2000 Guangzhou	Boys' doubles
Gold medal – first place	2000 Guangzhou	Mixed team
Silver medal – second place	2000 Guangzhou	Mixed doubles
Asian Junior Championships
Gold medal – first place	2000 Kyoto	Boys' doubles
Gold medal – first place	2000 Kyoto	Mixed doubles
Gold medal – first place	2000 Kyoto	Boys' team
Silver medal – second place	1999 Yangon	Mixed doubles
Silver medal – second place	1999 Yangon	Boys' team
Bronze medal – third place	1999 Yangon	Boys' doubles

Zheng Bo (simplified Chinese: 郑波; traditional Chinese: 鄭波; pinyin: Zhèng Bō; born 26 November 1983) is a Chinese badminton player.

== Career ==
A doubles specialist, Zheng won men's doubles at the 2003 Indonesia Open with Sang Yang. Zheng and Sang also secured the winning point against Denmark in the final of the 2004 Thomas Cup, to clinch China's first men's world team title since 1990. Most of his international titles, however, have come in mixed doubles. Zheng won the 2002 French Open with Zhang Yawen and the 2006 Hong Kong Open with Zhao Tingting. His other mixed doubles titles, all in partnership with doubles maestro Gao Ling, include the 2006 Asian Games, the 2007 China Masters, the prestigious All England Open Championships in both 2007 and 2008; and the 2007 Japan, German, Korea, Malaysia, and the 2007, 2008 Indonesia Opens. Zhang and Gao were the silver medalists behind Indonesia's Nova Widianto and Liliyana Natsir at the 2007 BWF World Championships in Kuala Lumpur. They were upset in the round of 16 at the 2008 Beijing Olympics by former World Champions Nathan Robertson and Gail Emms. Associated with Ma Jin, Zheng won the mixed doubles title at the 2010 BWF World Championships.

== Achievements ==
=== BWF World Championships ===
Men's doubles
Year	Venue	Partner	Opponent	Score	Result
2003	National Indoor Arena, Birmingham, England	(China) Sang Yang	(Denmark) Lars Paaske (Denmark) Jonas Rasmussen	6–15, 8–15	Bronze

Mixed doubles
Year	Venue	Partner	Opponent	Score	Result
2007	Putra Indoor Stadium, Kuala Lumpur, Malaysia	(China) Gao Ling	(Indonesia) Nova Widianto (Indonesia) Liliyana Natsir	16–21, 14–21	Silver
2010	Stade Pierre de Coubertin, Paris, France	(China) Ma Jin	(China) He Hanbin (China) Yu Yang	21–14, 21–10	Gold

=== World Cup ===
Mixed doubles
Year	Venue	Partner	Opponent	Score	Result
2006	Olympic Park, Yiyang, China	(China) Zhao Tingting	(China) Xie Zhongbo (China) Zhang Yawen	14–21, 11–21	Bronze

=== Asian Games ===
Mixed doubles
Year	Venue	Partner	Opponent	Score	Result
2006	Aspire Hall 3, Doha, Qatar	(China) Gao Ling	(China) Xie Zhongbo (China) Zhang Yawen	21–16, 25–23	Gold

=== World Junior Championships ===
Boys' doubles
Year	Venue	Partner	Opponent	Score	Result
2000	Tianhe Gymnasium, Guangzhou, China	(China) Sang Yang	(China) Cao Chen (China) Xie Zhongbo	7–5, 7–5, 2–7, 7–5	Gold

Mixed doubles
Year	Venue	Partner	Opponent	Score	Result
2000	Tianhe Gymnasium, Guangzhou, China	(China) Wei Yili	(China) Sang Yang (China) Zhang Yawen	3–7, 0–7, 6–8	Silver

=== Asian Junior Championships ===
Boys' doubles
Year	Venue	Partner	Opponent	Score	Result
1999	National Indoor Stadium – 1, Yangon, Myanmar	(China) Lin Dan	(China) Chen Yu (China) Sang Yang	15–10, 3–15, 10–15	Bronze
2000	Nishiyama Park Gymnasium, Kyoto, Japan	(China) Sang Yang	(South Korea) Jung Jae-sung (South Korea) Lee Jae-jin	17–16, 11–15, 15–12	Gold

Mixed doubles
Year	Venue	Partner	Opponent	Score	Result
1999	National Indoor Stadium – 1, Yangon, Myanmar	(China) Wei Yili	(Indonesia) Hendri Kurniawan Saputra (Indonesia) Enny Erlangga	12–15, 16–17	Silver
2000	Nishiyama Park Gymnasium, Kyoto, Japan	(China) Wei Yili	(China) Sang Yang (China) Zhang Yawen	Walkover	Gold

=== BWF Superseries ===
The BWF Superseries, launched on 14 December 2006 and implemented in 2007, is a series of elite badminton tournaments, sanctioned by Badminton World Federation (BWF). BWF Superseries has two level such as Superseries and Superseries Premier. A season of Superseries features twelve tournaments around the world, which introduced since 2011, with successful players invited to the Superseries Finals held at the year end.

Mixed doubles
Year	Tournament	Partner	Opponent	Score	Result
2007	Malaysia Open	(China) Gao Ling	(England) Nathan Robertson (England) Gail Emms	21–12, 14–21, 21–15	(gold) Winner
2007	Korea Open	(China) Gao Ling	(Denmark) Thomas Laybourn (Denmark) Kamilla Rytter Juhl	22–20, 21–19	(gold) Winner
2007	All England Open	(China) Gao Ling	(England) Anthony Clark (England) Donna Kellogg	16–21, 21–18, 21–14	(gold) Winner
2007	Indonesia Open	(China) Gao Ling	(Indonesia) Nova Widianto (Indonesia) Liliyana Natsir	21–16, 21–11	(gold) Winner
2007	China Masters	(China) Gao Ling	(England) Anthony Clark (England) Donna Kellogg	21–16, 21–17	(gold) Winner
2007	Japan Open	(China) Gao Ling	(Indonesia) Nova Widianto (Indonesia) Liliyana Natsir	21–19, 21–14	(gold) Winner
2007	Hong Kong Open	(China) Gao Ling	(Indonesia) Nova Widianto (Indonesia) Liliyana Natsir	23–21, 18–21, 19–21	(silver) Runner-up
2008	All England Open	(China) Gao Ling	(Indonesia) Nova Widianto (Indonesia) Liliyana Natsir	18–21, 21–14, 21–9	(gold) Winner
2008	Indonesia Open	(China) Gao Ling	(Denmark) Thomas Laybourn (Denmark) Kamilla Rytter Juhl	21–14, 21–8	(gold) Winner
2009	Swiss Open	(China) Ma Jin	(South Korea) Lee Yong-dae (South Korea) Lee Hyo-jung	21–16, 21–15	(gold) Winner
2009	Singapore Open	(China) Ma Jin	(China) Xie Zhongbo (China) Zhang Yawen	19–21, 21–19, 21–11	(gold) Winner
2009	Indonesia Open	(China) Ma Jin	(South Korea) Lee Yong-dae (South Korea) Lee Hyo-jung	21–17, 8–21, 21–16	(gold) Winner
2009	China Open	(China) Ma Jin	(South Korea) Lee Yong-dae (South Korea) Lee Hyo-jung	18–21, 21–15, 15–21	(silver) Runner-up

BWF Super Series Finals tournament
BWF Super Series Premier tournament
BWF Super Series tournament

=== BWF Grand Prix ===
The BWF Grand Prix had two levels, the BWF Grand Prix and Grand Prix Gold. It was a series of badminton tournaments sanctioned by the Badminton World Federation (BWF) which was held from 2007 to 2017. The World Badminton Grand Prix has been sanctioned by the International Badminton Federation from 1983 to 2006.

Men's doubles
Year	Tournament	Partner	Opponent	Score	Result
2003	Indonesia Open	(China) Sang Yang	(Thailand) Tesana Panvisvas (Thailand) Pramote Teerawiwatana	16–17, 17–15, 15–5	(gold) Winner
2004	Korea Open	(China) Sang Yang	(Indonesia) Luluk Hadiyanto (Indonesia) Alvent Yulianto	12–15, 12–15	(silver) Runner-up
2006	Macau Open	(China) Guo Zhendong	(China) Cai Yun (China) Fu Haifeng	12–21, 21–9, 19–21	(silver) Runner-up

Mixed doubles
Year	Tournament	Partner	Opponent	Score	Result
2003	Singapore Open	(China) Zhang Jiewen	(South Korea) Kim Dong-moon (South Korea) Ra Kyung-min	5–15, 9–15	(silver) Runner-up
2006	Hong Kong Open	(China) Zhao Tingting	(Indonesia) Nova Widianto (Indonesia) Liliyana Natsir	22–20, 21–19	(gold) Winner
2007	German Open	(China) Gao Ling	(China) Xu Chen (China) Zhao Tingting	21–11, 21–10	(gold) Winner
2009	German Open	(China) Ma Jin	(China) Xu Chen (China) Zhao Yunlei	18–21, 21–23	(silver) Runner-up
2009	Malaysia Grand Prix Gold	(China) Ma Jin	(China) Xu Chen (China) Zhao Yunlei	5–5, retired	(gold) Winner

BWF Grand Prix Gold tournament
BWF Grand Prix tournament

=== IBF International ===
Men's doubles
Year	Tournament	Partner	Opponent	Score	Result
2002	French International	(China) Sang Yang	(China) Cheng Rui (China) Wang Wei	7–8, 1–7, 3–7	(silver) Runner-up

Mixed doubles
Year	Tournament	Partner	Opponent	Score	Result
2002	French International	(China) Zhang Yawen	(China) Sang Yang (China) Zhao Tingting	7–0, 7–4, 7–8, 3–7, 8–6	(gold) Winner
