= 2000 Asian Junior Badminton Championships =

Tournament details
- Dates: 21–27 July 2000
- Venue: Nishiyama Park Gymnasium
- Location: Kyoto, Japan

The 2000 Asian Junior Badminton Championships were held in Nishiyama Park Gymnasium, Kyoto, Japan from 21 to 27 July and organized by the Kyoto Badminton Association. 21 countries competed at this competition, and in the end of the tournament, China clinched all the titles.

== Seeded ==
In the team event, Indonesia and China were the first seeded in the boys' and girls' team event. Shoji Sato was the first seeded in the boys' singles, and at the boys' doubles he also first seeded with Sho Sasaki. Wei Yan, Zhao Tingting/Li Yujia, and Sang Yang/Zhang Yawen from China were seeded first in the girls' singles, girls' doubles and mixed doubles respectively.

=== Boys' team ===
- 1. Indonesia
- 2. China
- 3. South Korea
- 3. Malaysia

=== Girls' team ===
- 1. China
- 2. South Korea

=== Boys' singles ===
- 1. (Japan) Shoji Sato
- 2. (China) Zhu Weilun
- 3. (China) Lin Dan
- 3. (Indonesia) Sony Dwi Kuncoro
- 5. (Malaysia) Lee Chong Wei
- 5. (Chinese Taipei) Liao Sheng-shiun
- 5. (South Korea) Jang Young-soo
- 5. (Thailand) Jackaphan Thanat
- 9. (China) Qiu Bohui
- 9. (Hong Kong) Chan Yan Kit
- 9. (India) Anup Shridhar
- 9. (Indonesia) Anggun Nugroho
- 9. (Japan) Sho Sasaki
- 9. (South Korea) Jung Jin-chul
- 9. (Singapore) Hendra Wijaya
- 9. (Chinese Taipei) Chin Sheng-ming

=== Girls' singles ===
- 1. (China) Wei Yan
- 2. (Malaysia) Ng Mee Fen
- 3. (Singapore) Xiao Luxi
- 3. (Chinese Taipei) Chien Yu-chin
- 5. (South Korea) Jun Jae-youn
- 5. (South Korea) Park Hyo-sun
- 5. (South Korea) Si Jin-sun
- 5. (Singapore) Liu Fan

=== Boys' doubles ===
- 1. (Japan) Shoji Sato/ Sho Sasaki
- 2. (China) Xie Zhongbo/ Cao Chen
- 3. (China) Sang Yang/ Zheng Bo
- 3. (Indonesia) Yan Peter/ Tri Heru Pamungkas
- 5. (Japan) Naoki Kawamae/ Yusuke Shinkai
- 5. (South Korea) Lee Jae-jin/ Jung Jae-sung
- 5. (Chinese Taipei) Liu Chi-cheng/ Hsu Wei-hung

=== Girls' doubles ===
- 1. (China) Zhao Tingting/ Li Yujia
- 2. (China) Zhang Yawen/ Wei Yili
- 3. (South Korea) Kim So-yeon/ Jung Yeon-kyung
- 5. (Japan) Naoki Kawamae/ Yusuke Shinkai
- 5. (Chinese Taipei) Chien Hsiu-lin/ Cheng Wen-hsing

=== Mixed doubles ===
- 1. (China) Sang Yang/ Zhang Yawen
- 2. (China) Zheng Bo/ Wei Yili
- 3. (Japan) Shoji Sato/ Tomomi Matsuda
- 3. (South Korea) Lee Jae-jin/ Hwang Yu-mi
- 5. (Indonesia) Bambang Saifulloh/ Lina Marlina
- 5. (Japan) Kohei Hayasaka/ Aki Akao
- 5. (Thailand) Jackaphan Thanat/ Salakjit Ponsana
- 5. (Chinese Taipei) Tsai Chia-hsin/ Cheng Wen-hsing

== Results ==
=== Semifinals ===
Category	Winner	Runner-up	Score
Boys' singles	(China) Lin Dan	(China) Qiu Bohui	Walkover
Boys' singles	(Indonesia) Sony Dwi Kuncoro	(Thailand) Jackaphan Thanat	10–15, 15–2, 17–16
Girls' singles	(China) Wei Yan	(South Korea) Park Hyo-sun	11–7, 13–10
Girls' singles	(China) Yu Jin	(China) Wang Rong	8–11, 11–3, 11–7
Boys' doubles	(South Korea) Jung Jae-sung (South Korea) Lee Jae-jin	(China) Cao Chen (China) Xie Zhongbo	15–1, 17–16
Boys' doubles	(China) Sang Yang (China) Zheng Bo	(Indonesia) Hendra Aprida Gunawan (Indonesia) Bambang Saifulloh	7–15, 15–2, 15–12
Girls' doubles	(China) Li Yujia (China) Zhao Tingting	(South Korea) Hwang Yu-mi (South Korea) Joo Hyun-hee	15–9, 15–5
Girls' doubles	(China) Wei Yili (China) Zhang Yawen	(South Korea) Kim So-yeon (South Korea) Jung Yeon-kyung	15–7, 15–2
Mixed doubles	(China) Sang Yang (China) Zhang Yawen	(South Korea) Lee Jae-jin (South Korea) Hwang Yu-mi	15–8, 14–17, 17–14
Mixed doubles	(China) Zheng Bo (China) Wei Yili	(Chinese Taipei) Tsai Chia-hsin (Chinese Taipei) Cheng Wen-hsing	15–3, 15–5

=== Finals ===
Category	Winners	Runners-up	Score
Boys' singles	(China) Lin Dan	(Indonesia) Sony Dwi Kuncoro	15–12, 15–5
Girls' singles	(China) Yu Jin	(China) Wei Yan	11–5, 11–3
Boys' doubles	(China) Sang Yang (China) Zheng Bo	(South Korea) Jung Jae-sung (South Korea) Lee Jae-jin	17–16, 11–15, 15–12
Girls' doubles	(China) Wei Yili (China) Zhang Yawen	(China) Li Yujia (China) Zhao Tingting	15–3, 15–12
Mixed doubles	(China) Zheng Bo (China) Wei Yili	(China) Sang Yang (China) Zhang Yawen	Walkover

== Medalists ==
In the boys' singles final, Lin Dan beat the Indonesian player Sony Dwi Kuncoro with the score 15–12, 15–5. Sang Yang and Zheng Bo won the boys' doubles title after defeat the Korean pair Lee Jae-jin and Jung Jae-sung in the rubber game with the score 17–16, 11–15, 15–12. Zheng Bo also won the mixed doubles title with Wei Yili, after the first seeded retired in the final match. while Wei also won the girls' doubles title with Zhang Yawen beat their compatriot Zhao Tingting and Li Yujia, 15–12, 15–5. The girls' singles title goes to Yu Jin who beat the top seeded Wei Yan with the score 15–5 and 15–3. China also secures the boys' and girls' team event after beat the Indonesia men's team and South Korea women's team with the score 3–0 respectively.

Event	Gold	Silver	Bronze
Boys' teams	China; Bao Chunlai; Cao Chen; Lin Dan; Qiu Bohui; Sang Yang; Xie Zhongbo; Zheng Bo; Zhu Weilun	Indonesia; Taufiq Hidayat Akbar; Ardiansyah; Hendra Aprida Gunawan; Markis Kido; Sony Dwi Kuncoro; Anggun Nugroho; Tri Heru Pamungkas; Yan Peter; Bambang Saifulloh	South Korea; Jang Young-soo; Jung Jae-sung; Jung Jin-chul; Kang Hyung-ki; Kim Sang-soo; Lee Jae-jin; Lee Seung-yoon
Boys' teams	China; Bao Chunlai; Cao Chen; Lin Dan; Qiu Bohui; Sang Yang; Xie Zhongbo; Zheng Bo; Zhu Weilun	Indonesia; Taufiq Hidayat Akbar; Ardiansyah; Hendra Aprida Gunawan; Markis Kido; Sony Dwi Kuncoro; Anggun Nugroho; Tri Heru Pamungkas; Yan Peter; Bambang Saifulloh	Malaysia; Gan Teik Chai; Yogendran Khrishnan; Kuan Beng Hong; Lee Chong Wei; Lin Woon Fui; Tan Chin Lee; Mohd Fairuzizuan Mohd Tazari
Girls' teams	China; Lei Minji; Li Yujia; Wang Rong; Wei Yan; Wei Yili; Yu Jin; Zhang Yawen; Zhao Tingting	South Korea; Hwang Yu-mi; Joo Hyun-hee; Jun Jae-youn; Jung Yeon-kyung; Kim So-yeon; Lee Jong-boon; Park Hyo-sun; Seo Yoon-hee; Si Jin-sun	Chinese Taipei; Cheng Hsiao-yun; Cheng Wen-hsing; Cheng Pei-ju; Chien Hsiu-lin; Chien Yu-chin
Girls' teams	China; Lei Minji; Li Yujia; Wang Rong; Wei Yan; Wei Yili; Yu Jin; Zhang Yawen; Zhao Tingting	South Korea; Hwang Yu-mi; Joo Hyun-hee; Jun Jae-youn; Jung Yeon-kyung; Kim So-yeon; Lee Jong-boon; Park Hyo-sun; Seo Yoon-hee; Si Jin-sun	Japan; Aki Akao; Marika Hirooka; Tomomi Matsuda; Kumiko Ogura; Reiko Shiota
Boys' singles	(China) Lin Dan	(Indonesia) Sony Dwi Kuncoro	(China) Qiu Bohui
Boys' singles	(China) Lin Dan	(Indonesia) Sony Dwi Kuncoro	(Thailand) Jackaphan Thanat
Girls' singles	(China) Yu Jin	(China) Wei Yan	(South Korea) Park Hyo-sun
Girls' singles	(China) Yu Jin	(China) Wei Yan	(China) Wang Rong
Boys' doubles	(China) Sang Yang (China) Zheng Bo	(South Korea) Jung Jae-sung (South Korea) Lee Jae-jin	(China) Cao Chen (China) Xie Zhongbo
Boys' doubles	(China) Sang Yang (China) Zheng Bo	(South Korea) Jung Jae-sung (South Korea) Lee Jae-jin	(Indonesia) Hendra Aprida Gunawan (Indonesia) Bambang Saifulloh
Girls' doubles	(China) Wei Yili (China) Zhang Yawen	(China) Li Yujia (China) Zhao Tingting	(South Korea) Jung Yeon-kyung (South Korea) Kim So-yeon
Girls' doubles	(China) Wei Yili (China) Zhang Yawen	(China) Li Yujia (China) Zhao Tingting	(South Korea) Hwang Yu-mi (South Korea) Joo Hyun-hee
Mixed doubles	(China) Zheng Bo (China) Wei Yili	(China) Sang Yang (China) Zhang Yawen	(South Korea) Lee Jae-jin (South Korea) Hwang Yu-mi
Mixed doubles	(China) Zheng Bo (China) Wei Yili	(China) Sang Yang (China) Zhang Yawen	(Chinese Taipei) Tsai Chia-hsin (Chinese Taipei) Cheng Wen-hsing

== Medal table ==
Rank	Nation	Gold	Silver	Bronze	Total
1	China (CHN)	7	3	3	13
2	South Korea (KOR)	0	2	5	7
3	Indonesia (INA)	0	2	1	3
4	Chinese Taipei (TPE)	0	0	2	2
5	Japan (JPN)	0	0	1	1
5	Malaysia (MAS)	0	0	1	1
5	Thailand (THA)	0	0	1	1
Totals (7 entries)		7	7	14	28
