= Wang Rong (badminton) =

Chinese badminton player (born 1984)

Wang Rong 王榮
Personal information
- Born: 18 April 1984 (age 42) Jiangsu, China
- Height: 1.70 m (5 ft 7 in)
- Weight: 55 kg (121 lb)

Sport
- Country: China; Macau
- Sport: Badminton

Women's singles & doubles
- Highest ranking: 67 (WS) 9 Sep 2010; 24 (WD) 24 Oct 2013
- BWF profile
Medal record
Badminton
Representing China
World Junior Championships
Silver medal – second place	2000 Guangzhou	Girls' singles
Asian Junior Championships
Gold medal – first place	2000 Kyoto	Girls' team
Bronze medal – third place	2000 Kyoto	Girls' singles

Wang Rong (Chinese: 王榮, born 18 April 1984 in Jiangsu) is a female Chinese badminton player. In 2010 she began representing Macau.

== Career ==
In 2000, Wang won silver medal at the World Junior Championships in girls' singles event. In 2001, she was runner-up in the Chinese National Badminton Championships in women's singles event. In 2002, she was runner-up of the French Open tournament in women's singles event. In 2004, she became the women's singles champion of the Chinese National Badminton Championships. In 2009, she was the runner-up of the Thailand Open tournament after defeated by her compatriot Liu Jian.

In 2010, she qualified to represent Macau at the Asian Games. However, as regulation rules required three years to pass since the individual has last represented a different country, her qualification was deemed invalid. The Macau team later decided to withdraw from the competition. At the Bitburger Open tournament in Germany, she was the runner-up in women's singles event defeated by Liu Xin of China with the score 21–16, 21–10. She also won the Osaka International tournament beat Kaori Imabeppu of Japan in the longest and closest final of the day in Osaka.

In 2011, she started to play in women's doubles event with Zhang Zhibo, they were competed at the Macau Open Badminton Championships and reached the second round. In 2012, she won the Bitburger Open and became the semi-finalist of the Korea Masters tournaments in women's doubles event partnered with Zhang Zhibo. At the 2012 Bitburger Open Grand Prix Gold she won the title after beat Johanna Goliszewski and Birgit Michels in straight games 21–15, 21–13.

In 2013, she became the semi-finalist of the Canadian and Chinese Taipei Open tournaments in women's doubles event with Zhang Zhibo. At the 2013 Canada Open Grand Prix they were defeated by Eefje Muskens and Selena Piek of the Netherlands with the score 21–16, 21–10, and at the Chinese Taipei Grand Prix Gold they were defeated by Lee So-hee and Shin Seung-chan of Korea with the score 21–13, 18–21, 21–16.
