= Lee Jae-jin (badminton) =

South Korean badminton player

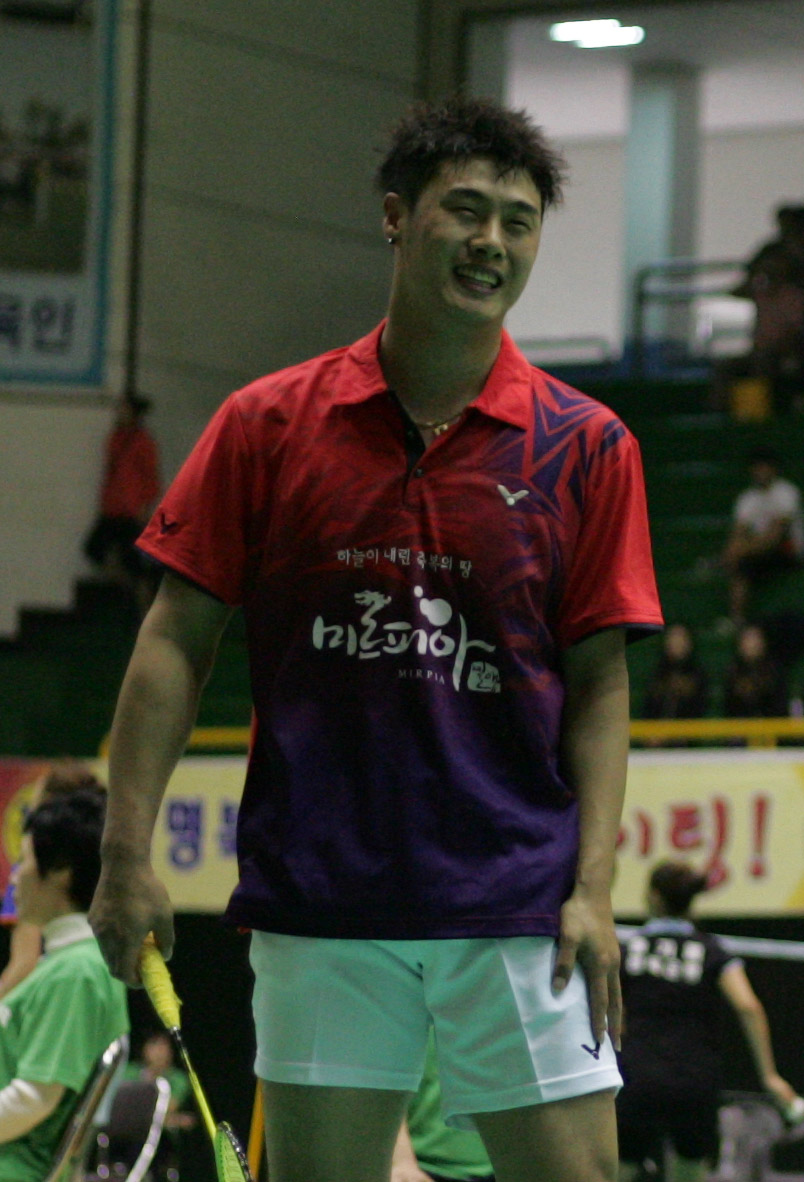
- Lee Jae-jin in 2012

Personal information
- Born: 이재진; January 26, 1983 (age 43) Miryang, South Gyeongsang, South Korea
- Years active: 1999 - 2015
- Height: 1.78 m (5 ft 10 in)
- Weight: 73 kg (161 lb; 11.5 st)

Sport
- Country: South Korea
- Sport: Badminton
- Handedness: Right

Men's & mixed doubles
- Current ranking: 11 (September 25, 2008)
- BWF profile
Medal record
Men's badminton
Representing South Korea
Olympic Games
Bronze medal – third place	2008 Beijing	Men's doubles
Sudirman Cup
Bronze medal – third place	2007 Glasgow	Mixed team
Bronze medal – third place	2005 Beijing	Mixed team
Thomas Cup
Silver medal – second place	2008 Jakarta	Men's team
Bronze medal – third place	2004 Jakarta	Men's team
Asian Games
Gold medal – first place	2002 Busan	Men's team
Silver medal – second place	2006 Doha	Men's team
Asian Championships
Silver medal – second place	2005 Hyderabad	Men's doubles
Silver medal – second place	2005 Hyderabad	Mixed doubles
Bronze medal – third place	2008 Johor Bahru	Men's doubles
World Junior Championships
Silver medal – second place	2000 Guangzhou	Mixed team
Bronze medal – third place	2000 Guangzhou	Mixed doubles
Asian Junior Championships
Gold medal – first place	2001 Taipei	Boys' doubles
Gold medal – first place	2001 Taipei	Mixed doubles
Silver medal – second place	2000 Kyoto	Boys' doubles
Bronze medal – third place	2001 Taipei	Boys' team
Bronze medal – third place	2000 Kyoto	Mixed doubles
Bronze medal – third place	2000 Kyoto	Boys' team
Bronze medal – third place	1999 Yangon	Boys' team

- Lee Jae-jin
- Hangul: 이재진
- Hanja: 李在珍
- RR: I Jaejin
- MR: I Chaejin

Lee Jae-jin (Korean: 이재진; Korean pronunciation: [i.dʑɛ̝.dʑin]; born 26 January 1983) is a badminton player from South Korea.

== Career ==
In 2003, he won the Hungarian International tournament in the mixed doubles event, and at the Norwegian International, he won the doubles title in the men's and mixed doubles events. In 2005, he won the mixed doubles title at the South Korea, German, Thailand, and Malaysia Open with Lee Hyo-jung. In Thailand, he also won the men's doubles title with Jung Jae-sung.

Lee played at the 2007 BWF World Championships in men's doubles with Hwang Ji-man. They were seeded tenth and were defeated in the third round by Candra Wijaya and Tony Gunawan, 21–17, 21–16.

In Beijing, 2008 Summer Olympics, Lee, and his partner Hwang won the first bronze medal after upsetting Choong Tan Fook/Lee Wan Wah in the first round and Tadashi Ohtsuka/Keita Masuda in the quarter-final, but were defeated by Cai Yun and Fu Haifeng of China in the semi-final. Nevertheless, in the bronze medal match, Lee and Hwang subdued Danish pair Lars Paaske and Jonas Rasmussen.

In 2011, Lee was back in the Korean mainstream press after winning the pro match at the national pro-boxing New King Challenge.

== Achievements ==
=== Olympic Games ===
Men's doubles
Year	Venue	Partner	Opponent	Score	Result
2008	Beijing University of Technology Gymnasium; Beijing, China	(South Korea) Hwang Ji-man	(Denmark) Lars Paaske (Denmark) Jonas Rasmussen	13–21, 21–18, 21–17	Bronze

=== Asian Championships ===
Men's doubles
Year	Venue	Partner	Opponent	Score	Result
2005	Gachibowli Indoor Stadium; Hyderabad, India	(South Korea) Jung Jae-sung	(Indonesia) Markis Kido (Indonesia) Hendra Setiawan	11–15, 7–15	Silver
2008	Bandaraya Stadium; Johor Bahru, Malaysia	(South Korea) Hwang Ji-man	(Indonesia) Candra Wijaya (Indonesia) Nova Widianto	15–21, 21–19, 17–21	Bronze

Mixed doubles
Year	Venue	Partner	Opponent	Score	Result
2005	Gachibowli Indoor Stadium; Hyderabad, India	(South Korea) Lee Hyo-jung	(Thailand) Sudket Prapakamol (Thailand) Saralee Thungthongkam	11–15, 17–14, 10–15	Silver

=== World Junior Championships ===
Mixed doubles
Year	Venue	Partner	Opponent	Score	Result
2000	Tianhe Gymnasium; Guangzhou, China	(South Korea) Hwang Yu-mi	(China) Zheng Bo (China) Wei Yili	4–7, 4–7, 0–7	Bronze

=== Asian Junior Championships ===
Boys' doubles
Year	Venue	Partner	Opponent	Score	Result
2000	Nishiyama Park Gymnasium; Kyoto, Japan	(South Korea) Jung Jae-sung	(China) Sang Yang (China) Zheng Bo	16–17, 15–11, 12–15	Silver
2001	Taipei Gymnasium; Taipei, Taiwan	(South Korea) Hwang Ji-man	(Thailand) Adisak Wiriyapadungpong (Thailand) Songphon Anugritayawon	17–15, 15–1	Gold

Mixed doubles
Year	Venue	Partner	Opponent	Score	Result
2000	Nishiyama Park Gymnasium; Kyoto, Japan	(South Korea) Hwang Yu-mi	(China) Sang Yang (China) Zhang Yawen	8–15, 17–14, 14–17	Bronze
2001	Taipei Gymnasium; Taipei, Taiwan	(South Korea) Hwang Yu-mi	(South Korea) Hwang Ji-man (South Korea) Bae Seung-hee	15–7, 15–12	Gold

=== BWF Superseries ===
The BWF Superseries, launched on 14 December 2006 and implemented in 2007, is a series of elite badminton tournaments, sanctioned by Badminton World Federation (BWF). BWF Superseries has two level such as Superseries and Superseries Premier. A season of Superseries features twelve tournaments around the world, which introduced since 2011, with successful players invited to the Superseries Finals held at the year end.

Men's doubles
Year	Tournament	Partner	Opponent	Score	Result
2007	Korea Open	(South Korea) Hwang Ji-man	(South Korea) Jung Jae-sung (South Korea) Lee Yong-dae	16–21, 15–21	(silver) Runner-up
2008	All England Open	(South Korea) Hwang Ji-man	(South Korea) Jung Jae-sung (South Korea) Lee Yong-dae	22–20, 19–21, 18–21	(silver) Runner-up

BWF Super Series tournament

=== BWF Grand Prix ===
The BWF Grand Prix has two level such as Grand Prix and Grand Prix Gold. It is a series of badminton tournaments, sanctioned by Badminton World Federation (BWF) since 2007. The World Badminton Grand Prix sanctioned by International Badminton Federation since 1983.

Men's doubles
Year	Tournament	Partner	Opponent	Score	Result
2005	Thailand Open	(South Korea) Jung Jae-sung	(Denmark) Lars Paaske (Denmark) Jonas Rasmussen	15–11, 15–5	(gold) Winner
2006	Thailand Open	(South Korea) Hwang Ji-man	(South Korea) Jung Jae-sung (South Korea) Lee Yong-dae	Walkover	(silver) Runner-up
2006	Korea Open	(South Korea) Hwang Ji-man	(United States) Tony Gunawan (Indonesia) Candra Wijaya	18–21, 18–21	(silver) Runner-up
2007	German Open	(South Korea) Hwang Ji-man	(South Korea) Jung Jae-sung (South Korea) Lee Yong-dae	21–18, 22–20	(gold) Winner
2007	Thailand Open	(South Korea) Hwang Ji-man	(South Korea) Jung Jae-sung (South Korea) Lee Yong-dae	21–19, 19–21, 21–9	(gold) Winner
2008	German Open	(South Korea) Hwang Ji-man	(South Korea) Jung Jae-sung (South Korea) Lee Yong-dae	21–13, 21–19	(gold) Winner

Mixed doubles
Year	Tournament	Partner	Opponent	Score	Result
2005	Korea Open	(South Korea) Lee Hyo-jung	(Denmark) Jens Eriksen (Denmark) Mette Schjoldager	17–14, 15–9	(gold) Winner
2005	German Open	(South Korea) Lee Hyo-jung	(England) Nathan Robertson (England) Gail Emms	15–12, 17–14	(gold) Winner
2005	Thailand Open	(South Korea) Lee Hyo-jung	(Denmark) Thomas Laybourn (Denmark) Kamilla Rytter Juhl	15–12, 15–12	(gold) Winner
2005	Malaysia Open	(South Korea) Lee Hyo-jung	(China) Chen Qiqiu (China) Zhao Tingting	15–12, 15–11	(gold) Winner
2005	China Open	(South Korea) Lee Hyo-jung	(England) Nathan Robertson (England) Gail Emms	10–15, 10–15	(silver) Runner-up
2006	Chinese Taipei Open	(South Korea) Lee Hyo-jung	(Indonesia) Nova Widianto (Indonesia) Liliyana Natsir	21–17, 21–23, 13–21	(silver) Runner-up

BWF Grand Prix Gold tournament
BWF Grand Prix tournament

=== BWF International Challenge/Series ===
Men's doubles
Year	Tournament	Partner	Opponent	Score	Result
2003	Hungarian International	(South Korea) Hwang Ji-man	(South Korea) Jeon Jun-bum (South Korea) Yoo Yeon-seong	15–12, 15–12	(gold) Winner
2003	Norwegian International	(South Korea) Hwang Ji-man	(England) David Lindley (England) Kristian Roebuck	15–10, 15–2	(gold) Winner
2009	Singapore International	(South Korea) Heo Hoon-hoi	(Singapore) Chayut Triyachart (Singapore) Danny Bawa Chrisnanta	20–22, 21–18, 21–16	(gold) Winner

Mixed doubles
Year	Tournament	Partner	Opponent	Score	Result
2003	Norwegian International	(South Korea) Lee Eun-woo	(England) Kristian Roebuck (England) Liza Parker	17–16, 15–2	(gold) Winner
2005	Malaysia Satellite	(South Korea) Kim Jin-ah	(Malaysia) Gan Teik Chai (Malaysia) Fong Chew Yen	15–7, 8–15, 3–15	(silver) Runner-up
2008	Korean International	(South Korea) Kim Jin-ock	(South Korea) Hwang Ji-man (South Korea) Hwang Yu-mi	15–21, 14–21	(silver) Runner-up
2009	Singapore International	(South Korea) Kim Jin-ock	(South Korea) Heo Hoon-hoi (South Korea) Jung Kyung-eun	21–19, 21–11	(gold) Winner
2012	Indonesia International	(South Korea) Yoo Hyun-young	(Indonesia) Tri Kusmawardana (Indonesia) Aprilsasi Putri Lejarsar Variella	19–21, 21–13, 21–12	(gold) Winner

BWF International Challenge tournament
BWF International Series tournament
