= Jung Yeon-kyung =

South Korean badminton player (born 1982)

Personal information
- Born: 27 August 1982 (age 44)

Sport
- Country: South Korea
- Sport: Badminton
- Event: Women's doubles

Women's doubles
- BWF profile
Medal record
Women's badminton
Representing South Korea
Uber Cup
| Bronze medal – third place | 2000 Kuala Lumpur | Women's team |
World Junior Championships
| Silver medal – second place | 2000 Guangzhou | Mixed team |
Asian Junior Championships
| Silver medal – second place | 2000 Kyoto | Girls' team |
| Bronze medal – third place | 2000 Kyoto | Girls' doubles |

Jung Yeon-kyung (Korean: 정연경; born 27 August 1982) is a South Korean badminton player. She was part of the Korean junior team that won the silver medal at the 2000 Asian Junior Championships, and also clinched the bronze medal in the girls' doubles event. Jung who educated at the Haksan Girls' High School, competed at the 2000 World Junior Championships, and won the mixed team silver medal after being defeated by Chinese team in the final. Jung later joined the Samsung Electro-Mechanics team, and won the women's doubles title at the 2003 Noonnoppi Cup Badminton Super Series partnered with Chung Jae-hee.

== Achievements ==
=== Asian Junior Championships ===
Girls' doubles
| Year | Venue | Partner | Opponent | Score | Result |
|---|---|---|---|---|---|
| 2000 | Nishiyama Park Gymnasium; Kyoto, Japan | (South Korea) Kim So-yeon | (China) Li Yujia (China) Zhang Yawen | 7–15, 2–15 | Bronze |

=== BWF International ===
Women's doubles
| Year | Tournament | Partner | Opponent | Score | Result |
|---|---|---|---|---|---|
| 1999 | Hungarian International | (South Korea) Kim So-yeon | (South Korea) Lee Hyo-jung (South Korea) Yim Kyung-jin | 9–15, 13–15 | (silver) Runner-up |
| 1999 | Norwegian International | (South Korea) Kim So-yeon | (South Korea) Lee Hyo-jung (South Korea) Yim Kyung-jin | 7–15, 3–15 | (silver) Runner-up |
| 2002 | Malaysia Satellite | (South Korea) Lee Kyung-won | (South Korea) Chung Jae-hee (South Korea) Yim Kyung-jin | 2–11, 11–3, 8–11 | (silver) Runner-up |
| 2006 | India Satellite | (South Korea) Kim Min-jung | (India) Jwala Gutta (India) Shruti Kurien | 21–18, 21–19 | (gold) Winner |
| 2006 | Malaysia Satellite | (South Korea) Kim Min-jung | (South Korea) Jung Kyung-eun (South Korea) Yoo Hyun-young | 21–14, 21–17 | (gold) Winner |

Mixed doubles
| Year | Tournament | Partner | Opponent | Score | Result |
|---|---|---|---|---|---|
| 2006 | India Satellite | (South Korea) Jung Hoon-min | (South Korea) Kim Young-sun (South Korea) Sun In-jang | 21–12, 19–21, 21–18 | (gold) Winner |
