= Zhao Tingting =

Chinese badminton player (born 1982)

Zhao Tingting 赵婷婷
Personal information
- Born: 28 November 1982 (age 43) Nantong, Jiangsu, China
- Height: 1.68 m (5 ft 6 in)
- Weight: 62 kg (137 lb)

Sport
- Country: China
- Sport: Badminton
- Handedness: Right

Women's doubles
- Highest ranking: 1 (29 October 2009)
- Current ranking: Retired
- BWF profile
Medal record
Women's badminton
Representing China
World Championships
Gold medal – first place	2009 Hyderabad	Women's doubles
Silver medal – second place	2003 Birmingham	Women's doubles
Bronze medal – third place	2003 Birmingham	Mixed doubles
World Cup
Bronze medal – third place	2005 Yiyang	Women's doubles
Bronze medal – third place	2006 Yiyang	Mixed doubles
Sudirman Cup
Gold medal – first place	2005 Beijing	Mixed team
Gold medal – first place	2007 Glasgow	Mixed team
Gold medal – first place	2009 Guangzhou	Mixed team
Silver medal – second place	2003 Eindhoven	Mixed team
Uber Cup
Gold medal – first place	2004 Jakarta	Women's team
Gold medal – first place	2008 Jakarta	Women's team
Asian Championships
Gold medal – first place	2007 Johor Bahru	Women's doubles
Silver medal – second place	2007 Johor Bahru	Mixed doubles
Bronze medal – third place	2001 Manila	Women's doubles
Bronze medal – third place	2002 Bangkok	Women's doubles
Bronze medal – third place	2002 Bangkok	Mixed doubles
World Junior Championships
Gold medal – first place	2000 Guangzhou	Mixed team
Silver medal – second place	2000 Guangzhou	Girls' doubles
Asian Junior Championships
Gold medal – first place	1999 Yangon	Girls' team
Gold medal – first place	2000 Kyoto	Girls' team
Silver medal – second place	2000 Kyoto	Girls' doubles
Bronze medal – third place	1999 Yangon	Girls' doubles

Zhao Tingting (simplified Chinese: 赵婷婷; traditional Chinese: 趙婷婷; pinyin: Zhào Tíngtíng; born 28 November 1982) is a Chinese badminton player from Nantong, Jiangsu.

== Career ==
A doubles specialist, Zhao has often been a "utility player" on China's national team, winning international tournaments with a variety of compatriots who typically partner someone else. She has won women's doubles at the Denmark (2002, 2004) and Thailand (2003) Opens with Wei Yili; the French (2002), China (2008), and Hong Kong (2008) Opens with Zhang Yawen; the Swiss Open (2007) and Asian Championships (2007) with Yang Wei; and at the China Open (2007) with Gao Ling. She has also captured mixed doubles titles at the Thailand (2003) and Denmark (2004) Opens with Chen Qiqiu, and at the Hong Kong Open (2006) with Zheng Bo.

Zhao was a women's doubles silver medalist with Wei Yili at the 2003 IBF World Championships in Birmingham, England, dropping the final to compatriots Gao Ling and Huang Sui, and a mixed doubles bronze medalist with Chen Qiqiu at the same tournament. At the 2004 Olympics in Athens she just missed a medal by finishing fourth in women's doubles with Wei Yili and losing in the quarterfinals of mixed doubles with Chen Qiqiu. Zhao was not selected to compete in the 2008 Beijing Olympics, a victim of China's great depth in women's badminton and rules that limit the number of Olympic entries from any one country. However, 2009 proved to be her most successful year as Zhao won both the prestigious All-England and BWF World Championships in women's doubles with Zhang Yawen. With these achievements, she reportedly retired from the Chinese team at the end of the 2009 season.

== Achievements ==
=== BWF World Championships ===
Women's doubles
Year	Venue	Partner	Opponent	Score	Result
2009	Gachibowli Indoor Stadium, Hyderabad, India	(China) Zhang Yawen	(China) Cheng Shu (China) Zhao Yunlei	17–21, 21–17, 21–16	Gold
2003	National Indoor Arena, Birmingham, England	(China) Wei Yili	(China) Gao Ling (China) Huang Sui	8–15, 11–15	Silver

Mixed doubles
Year	Venue	Partner	Opponent	Score	Result
2003	National Indoor Arena, Birmingham, England	(China) Chen Qiqiu	(South Korea) Kim Dong-moon (South Korea) Ra Kyung-min	7–15, 5–15	Bronze

=== World Cup ===
Women's doubles
Year	Venue	Partner	Opponent	Score	Result
2005	Olympic Park, Yiyang, China	(China) Zhang Dan	(China) Yang Wei (China) Zhang Jiewen	21–15, 9–21, 10–21	Bronze

Mixed doubles
Year	Venue	Partner	Opponent	Score	Result
2006	Olympic Park, Yiyang, China	(China) Zheng Bo	(China) Xie Zhongbo (China) Zhang Yawen	14–21, 11–21	Bronze

=== Asian Championships ===
Women's doubles
Year	Venue	Partner	Opponent	Score	Result
2007	Stadium Bandaraya, Johor Bahru, Malaysia	(China) Yang Wei	(China) Cheng Shu (China) Zhao Yunlei	21–10, 21–11	Gold
2002	Bangkok, Thailand	(China) Wei Yili	(China) Gao Ling (China) Huang Sui	5–11, 1–11	Bronze
2001	PhilSports Arena, Manila, Philippines	(China) Zhang Yawen	(Indonesia) Deyana Lomban (Indonesia) Vita Marissa	12–15, 15–11, 12–15	Bronze

Mixed doubles
Year	Venue	Partner	Opponent	Score	Result
2007	Stadium Bandaraya, Johor Bahru, Malaysia	(China) Xu Chen	(China) He Hanbin (China) Yu Yang	20–22, 15–21	Silver
2002	Bangkok, Thailand	(China) Wang Wei	(China) Zhang Jun (China) Gao Ling	4–11, 3–11	Bronze

=== World Junior Championships ===
Girls' doubles
Year	Venue	Partner	Opponent	Score	Result
2000	Tianhe Gymnasium, Guangzhou, China	(China) Li Yujia	(China) Zhang Yawen (China) Wei Yili	7–4, 2–7, 0–7, 1–7	Silver

=== Asian Junior Championships ===
Girls' doubles
Year	Venue	Partner	Opponent	Score	Result
2000	Nishiyama Park Gymnasium, Kyoto, Japan	(China) Li Yujia	(China) Zhang Yawen (China) Wei Yili	12–15, 5–15	Silver
1999	National Indoor Stadium – 1, Yangon, Myanmar	(China) Zhang Yawen	(China) Wei Yili (China) Li Yujia	7–15, 10–15	Bronze

=== BWF Superseries ===
The BWF Superseries, launched on 14 December 2006 and implemented in 2007, is a series of elite badminton tournaments, sanctioned by Badminton World Federation (BWF). BWF Superseries has two level such as Superseries and Superseries Premier. A season of Superseries features twelve tournaments around the world, which introduced since 2011, with successful players invited to the Superseries Finals held at the year end.

Women's doubles
Year	Tournament	Partner	Opponent	Score	Result
2009	Singapore Open	(China) Zhang Yawen	(Indonesia) Nitya Krishinda Maheswari (Indonesia) Greysia Polii	21–14, 21–13	(gold) Winner
2009	All England Open	(China) Zhang Yawen	(China) Cheng Shu (China) Zhao Yunlei	21–13, 21–15	(gold) Winner
2008	Hong Kong Open	(China) Zhang Yawen	(China) Cheng Shu (China) Zhao Yunlei	21–14, 21–13	(gold) Winner
2008	China Open	(China) Zhang Yawen	(Malaysia) Chin Eei Hui (Malaysia) Wong Pei Tty	21–14, 21–19	(gold) Winner
2008	Korea Open	(China) Gao Ling	(China) Du Jing (China) Yu Yang	15–21, 13–21	(silver) Runner-up
2008	Malaysia Open	(China) Gao Ling	(China) Yang Wei (China) Zhang Jiewen	13–21, 21–16, 22–24	(silver) Runner-up
2007	China Open	(China) Gao Ling	(China) Du Jing (China) Yu Yang	17–21, 21–15, 21–8	(gold) Winner
2007	French Open	(China) Yu Yang	(China) Zhang Yawen (China) Wei Yili	10–21, 15–21	(silver) Runner-up
2007	Japan Open	(China) Yu Yang	(China) Yang Wei (China) Zhang Jiewen	17–21, 5–21	(silver) Runner-up
2007	China Masters	(China) Yang Wei	(Indonesia) Liliyana Natsir (Indonesia) Vita Marissa	21–12, 15–21, 16–21	(silver) Runner-up
2007	Indonesia Open	(China) Yang Wei	(China) Du Jing (China) Yu Yang	8–21, 21–16, 20–22	(silver) Runner-up
2007	Singapore Open	(China) Yang Wei	(China) Zhang Yawen (China) Wei Yili	21–10, 19–21, 18–21	(silver) Runner-up
2007	Swiss Open	(China) Yang Wei	(South Korea) Lee Kyung-won (South Korea) Lee Hyo-jung	21–15, 21–10	(gold) Winner

BWF Super Series Finals tournament
BWF Super Series Premier tournament
BWF Super Series tournament

=== BWF Grand Prix ===
The BWF Grand Prix has two levels, the Grand Prix Gold and Grand Prix. It is a series of badminton tournaments, sanctioned by the Badminton World Federation (BWF) since 2007. The World Badminton Grand Prix has been sanctioned by the International Badminton Federation since 1983.

Women's doubles
Year	Tournament	Partner	Opponent	Score	Result
2006	Singapore Open	(China) Zhang Dan	(China) Yang Wei (China) Zhang Jiewen	18–21, 18–21	(silver) Runner-up
2006	SwissOpen	(China) Zhang Dan	(China) Du Jing (China) Yu Yang	5–15, 15–10, 11–15	(silver) Runner-up
2005	Japan Open	(China) Wei Yili	(China) Yang Wei (China) Zhang Jiewen	12–15, 2–15	(silver) Runner-up
2005	All England Open	(China) Wei Yili	(China) Gao Ling (China) Huang Sui	10–15, 13–15	(silver) Runner-up
2005	German Open	(China) Wei Yili	(China) Gao Ling (China) Huang Sui	4–15, 10–15	(silver) Runner-up
2004	China Open	(China) Wei Yili	(China) Yang Wei (China) Zhang Jiewen	14–15, 12–15	(silver) Runner-up
2004	German Open	(China) Wei Yili	(China) Zhang Dan (China) Zhang Yawen	8–15, 12–15	(silver) Runner-up
2004	Denmark Open	(China) Wei Yili	(China) Zhang Dan (China) Zhang Yawen	15–13, 12–15, 15–7	(gold) Winner
2004	Japan Open	(China) Wei Yili	(South Korea) Lee Kyung-won (South Korea) Ra Kyung-min	6–15, 15–5, 1–15	(silver) Runner-up
2003	Japan Open	(China) Wei Yili	(China) Gao Ling (China) Huang Sui	13–10, 6–11, 5–11	(silver) Runner-up
2003	Swiss Open	(China) Wei Yili	(China) Yang Wei (China) Zhang Jiewen	7–11, 11–6, 4–11	(silver) Runner-up
2003	Thailand Open	(China) Wei Yili	(South Korea) Lee Hyo-jung (South Korea) Yim Kyung-jin	11–9, 5–11, 11–6	(gold) Winner
2002	China Open	(China) Wei Yili	(China) Gao Ling (China) Huang Sui	9–11, 3–11	(silver) Runner-up
2002	Denmark Open	(China) Wei Yili	(Netherlands) Mia Audina (Netherlands) Lotte Jonathans	11–3, 6–11, 11–9	(gold) Winner
2002	Malaysia Open	(China) Zhang Yawen	(China) Yang Wei (China) Huang Nanyan	5–11, 5–11	(silver) Runner-up
2001	Singapore Open	(China) Zhang Yawen	(China) Wei Yili (China) Zhang Jiewen	6–8, 3–7, 4–7	(silver) Runner-up

Mixed doubles
Year	Tournament	Partner	Opponent	Score	Result
2007	German Open	(China) Xu Chen	(China) Zheng Bo (China) Gao Ling	11–21, 10–21	(silver) Runner-up
2006	China Open	(China) Xu Chen	(China) Xie Zhongbo (China) Zhang Yawen	19–21, 5–21	(silver) Runner-up
2006	Hong Kong Open	(China) Zheng Bo	(Indonesia) Nova Widianto (Indonesia) Liliyana Natsir	22–20, 21–19	(gold) Winner
2005	Malaysia Open	(China) Chen Qiqiu	(South Korea) Lee Jae-jin (South Korea) Lee Hyo-jung	12–15, 11–15	(silver) Runner-up
2004	China Open	(China) Chen Qiqiu	(Denmark) Jens Eriksen (Denmark) Mette Schjoldager	13–15, 15–13, 8–15	(silver) Runner-up
2004	German Open	(China) Chen Qiqiu	(Denmark) Carsten Mogensen (Denmark) Rikke Olsen	15–12, 8–15, 9–15	(silver) Runner-up
2004	Denmark Open	(China) Chen Qiqiu	(England) Nathan Robertson (England) Gail Emms	15–4, 15–11	(gold) Winner
2003	China Open	(China) Chen Qiqiu	(China) Zhang Jun (China) Gao Ling	13–15, 6–15	(silver) Runner-up
2003	All England Open	(China) Chen Qiqiu	(China) Zhang Jun (China) Gao Ling	6–11, 7–11	(silver) Runner-up
2003	Thailand Open	(China) Chen Qiqiu	(England) Nathan Robertson (England) Gail Emms	11–4, 8–11, 11–0	(gold) Winner
2002	China Open	(China) Chen Qiqiu	(China) Zhang Jun (China) Gao Ling	4–11, 4–11	(silver) Runner-up

BWF Grand Prix Gold tournament
BWF Grand Prix tournament

=== IBF International ===
Women's doubles
Year	Tournament	Partner	Opponent	Score	Result
2002	French International	(China) Zhang Yawen	(China) Wei Yili (China) Zhang Jiewen	1–7, 2–7, 7–5, 7–5, 7–2	(gold) Winner

Mixed doubles
Year	Tournament	Partner	Opponent	Score	Result
2002	French International	(China) Sang Yang	(China) Zheng Bo (China) Zhang Yawen	0–7, 4–7, 8–7, 7–3, 6–8	(silver) Runner-up
