= 2005 China Masters =

Tournament details
- Dates: 29 August – 4 September 2005
- Edition: 1
- Total prize money: US$250,000
- Venue: University Students' Gymnasium
- Location: Beijing, China

Champions
- Men's singles: (China) Lin Dan
- Women's singles: (China) Zhang Ning
- Men's doubles: (China) Guo Zhendong (China) Xie Zhongbo
- Women's doubles: (China) Du Jing (China) Yu Yang
- Mixed doubles: (China) Zhang Jun (China) Gao Ling

The 2005 China Masters was a badminton tournament which took place at the University Students' Gymnasium in Beijing, China, on 29 August–4 September 2005 and had a total purse of $250,000. This is the inaugural edition of the tournament, and rated as 6–star IBF World Grand Prix event.

== Men's singles ==
=== Finals ===
Semi-finals
(China) Lin Dan	15	15
(China) Zhu Weilun	5	5
(China) Bao Chunlai	13	15	15
(China) Chen Yu	15	6	3

Final
(China) Lin Dan	15	15
(China) Bao Chunlai	6	13

=== Top half ===
==== Section 1 ====
First Round
(China) Lin Dan	15	15
(Malaysia) Yogendran Khrishnan	7	5
(China) Chen Jin	15	15
(Hong Kong) Wei Nan	5	5
(Denmark) Niels Christian Kaldau	15	15
(China) Lu Qicheng	8	12
(Malaysia) Roslin Hashim	8	15	15
(China) Qiu Yanbo	15	12	8

Second Round
(China) Lin Dan	15	7	15
(China) Chen Jin	4	15	4
(Denmark) Niels Christian Kaldau	10	15	15
(Malaysia) Roslin Hashim	15	3	12

Quarter-finals
(China) Lin Dan	15	15
(Denmark) Niels Christian Kaldau	7	8

==== Section 2 ====
First Round
(China) Chen Hong	15	15
(Japan) Shinya Ohtsuka	7	7
(Japan) Yuichi Ikeda	15	6	6
(China) Zhu Weilun	13	15	15
(China) Xia Xuanze	15	15
(Japan) Sho Sasaki	5	5
(Wales) Martyn Lewis	9	9
(China) Wu Yunyong	15	15

Second Round
(China) Chen Hong	4	15	11
(China) Zhu Weilun	15	4	15
(China) Xia Xuanze	11	15	10
(China) Wu Yunyong	15	11	15

Quarter-finals
(China) Zhu Weilun	15	15
(China) Wu Yunyong	5	4

=== Bottom half ===
==== Section 3 ====
First Round
(China) Li Yu	5	15	15
(Malaysia) Lee Tsuen Seng	15	5	13
(China) Xie Xin	6	15	8
(Malaysia) Kuan Beng Hong	15	11	15
(China) You Hao	15	15	15
(Canada) Bobby Milroy	6	17	9
(Malaysia) Yeoh Kay Bin	5	10
(China) Bao Chunlai	15	15

Second Round
(China) Li Yu	7	15	9
(Malaysia) Kuan Beng Hong	15	6	15
(China) You Hao	11	4
(China) Bao Chunlai	15	15

Quarter-finals
(Malaysia) Kuan Beng Hong	7	8
(China) Bao Chunlai	15	15

==== Section 4 ====
First Round
(China) Gong Weijie	w	/	o
(Japan) Hidetaka Yamada
(China) Shi Hong	3	10
(Hong Kong) Ng Wei	15	15
(Malaysia) Pei Wee Chung	10	3
(China) Chen Yu	15	15
(China) Lü Yi	15	15
(Denmark) Peter Gade	13	12

Second Round
(China) Gong Weijie	11	6
(Hong Kong) Ng Wei	15	15
(China) Chen Yu	15	15
(China) Lü Yi	6	7

Quarter-finals
(Hong Kong) Ng Wei	14	7
(China) Chen Yu	17	15

== Women's singles ==
=== Finals ===
Semi-finals
(China) Zhang Ning	11	11
(China) Liu Jian	9	4
(Hong Kong) Zhou Mi	11	11
(China) Xie Xingfang	9	7

Final
(China) Zhang Ning	11	5	11
(Hong Kong) Zhou Mi	3	11	3

=== Top half ===
==== Section 1 ====
First Round
(China) Wang Rong	3	5
(China) Wang Yihan	11	11

Second Round
(China) Zhang Ning	8	11	11
(China) Chen Li	11	3	4
(Japan) Kanako Yonekura	11	3
(China) Wang Yihan	13	11

Quarter-finals
(China) Zhang Ning	11	11
(China) Wang Yihan	1	2

==== Section 2 ====
First Round
(China) Jiang Yanjiao	6	11	11
(China) Lu Lan	11	5	3
(China) Liu Jian	11	11
(China) Chen Lanting	7	6

Second Round
(Hong Kong) Wang Chen
(China) Jiang Yanjiao	w	/	o
(China) Zhu Lin	2	9
(China) Liu Jian	11	11

Quarter-finals
(China) Jiang Yanjiao	9	9
(China) Liu Jian	11	11

=== Bottom half ===
==== Section 3 ====
First Round
(China) Tai Yi	7	1
(Japan) Yu Hirayama	11	11
(Japan) Yoshimi Hataya	11	11
(China) Bo Rong	6	8

Second Round
(Japan) Yu Hirayama	7	4
(Hong Kong) Zhou Mi	11	11
(Japan) Yoshimi Hataya	3	8
(Netherlands) Yao Jie	11	11

Quarter-finals
(Hong Kong) Zhou Mi	10	11	11
(Netherlands) Yao Jie	13	6	4

==== Section 4 ====
First Round
(Malaysia) Wong Mew Choo	13	7	10
(China) Wang Lin	12	11	13

Second Round
(China) Wang Lin	11	11
(Singapore) Li Li	6	6
(China) Li Wen	1	8
(China) Xie Xingfang	11	11

Quarter-finals
(China) Wang Lin	2	11	9
(China) Xie Xingfang	11	7	11

== Men's doubles ==
=== Finals ===
Semi-finals
(Malaysia) Choong Tan Fook (Malaysia) Lee Wan Wah	15	15
(Japan) Keita Masuda (Japan) Tadashi Ohtsuka	2	11
(China) Guo Zhendong (China) Xie Zhongbo	15	8	15
(Poland) Michał Łogosz (Poland) Robert Mateusiak	8	15	4

Final
(Malaysia) Choong Tan Fook (Malaysia) Lee Wan Wah	10	4
(China) Guo Zhendong (China) Xie Zhongbo	15	15

=== Top half ===
==== Section 1 ====
First Round
(Malaysia) Choong Tan Fook (Malaysia) Lee Wan Wah	15	15
(China) Shen Ye (China) Zhang Wei	6	6

Second Round
(China) Cai Yun (China) Fu Haifeng	15	13	15
(China) Sun Junjie (China) Xu Chen	6	15	5
(China) Gu Jian (China) Lu Jian	9	8
(Malaysia) Choong Tan Fook (Malaysia) Lee Wan Wah	15	15

Quarter-finals
(China) Cai Yun (China) Fu Haifeng	12	9
(Malaysia) Choong Tan Fook (Malaysia) Lee Wan Wah	15	15

==== Section 2 ====
First Round
(China) Zhang Yingdong (China) Zhu Xin	4	5
(Malaysia) Hoon Thien How (Malaysia) Tan Boon Heong	15	15

Second Round
(Wales) Matthew Hughes (Wales) Martyn Lewis	12	7
(China) Cao Liu (China) Li Rui	15	15
(Japan) Keita Masuda (Japan) Tadashi Ohtsuka	15	15
(Malaysia) Hoon Thien How (Malaysia) Tan Boon Heong	6	3

Quarter-finals
(China) Cao Liu (China) Li Rui	11	3
(Japan) Keita Masuda (Japan) Tadashi Ohtsuka	15	15

=== Bottom half ===
==== Section 3 ====
First Round
(China) Gong Weijie (China) He Hanbin	15	15
(Hong Kong) Hui Wai Ho (Hong Kong) Yan Chun Yu	5	12

Second Round
(China) Gong Weijie (China) He Hanbin	13	15	6
(Malaysia) Mohd Zakry Abdul Latif (Malaysia) Gan Teik Chai	15	5	15
(China) Guo Zhendong (China) Xie Zhongbo	15	15
(China) Sang Yang (China) Zheng Bo	11	12

Quarter-finals
(Malaysia) Mohd Zakry Abdul Latif (Malaysia) Gan Teik Chai	3	10
(China) Guo Zhendong (China) Xie Zhongbo	15	15

==== Section 4 ====
First Round
(China) Wei Shifeng (China) Xu Dazhong	14	8
(Japan) Naoki Kawamae (Japan) Shuichi Nakao	17	15

Second Round
(Japan) Naoki Kawamae (Japan) Shuichi Nakao	12	4
(Japan) Shintaro Ikeda (Japan) Shuichi Sakamoto	15	15
(China) Hu Wenqing (China) Li Tian	9	5
(Poland) Michał Łogosz (Poland) Robert Mateusiak	15	15

Quarter-finals
(Japan) Shintaro Ikeda (Japan) Shuichi Sakamoto	15	8
(Poland) Michał Łogosz (Poland) Robert Mateusiak	17	15

== Women's doubles ==
=== Finals ===
Semi-finals
(China) Ding Jiao (China) Zhang Jian	3	5
(China) Du Jing (China) Yu Yang	15	15
(China) Tian Qing (China) Zhao Yunlei	9	3
(China) Gao Ling (China) Huang Sui	15	15

Final
(China) Du Jing (China) Yu Yang	15	17
(China) Gao Ling (China) Huang Sui	4	14

=== Top half ===
First Round
(Japan) Miyuki Maeda (Japan) Satoko Suetsuna	7	15	10
(China) Ding Jiao (China) Zhang Jian	15	5	15
(China) Wei Yili (China) Zhao Tingting
(China) Chen Ni (China) Wang Xinxin	w	/	o
(China) Du Jing (China) Yu Yang	15	15
(Hong Kong) Koon Wai Chee (Hong Kong) Li Wing Mui	10	2

Quarter-finals
(China) Yang Wei (China) Zhang Jiewen
(China) Ding Jiao (China) Zhang Jian	w	/	o
(China) Chen Ni (China) Wang Xinxin	9	0
(China) Du Jing (China) Yu Yang	15	15

Semi-finals
(China) Ding Jiao (China) Zhang Jian	3	5
(China) Du Jing (China) Yu Yang	15	15

=== Bottom half ===
First Round
(China) Feng Chen (China) Pan Pan	15	15
(Singapore) Jiang Yanmei (Singapore) Li Yujia	11	5
(China) Tian Qing (China) Zhao Yunlei	15	17
(China) Zhang Dan (China) Zhang Yawen	8	14
(China) Cheng Shu (China) Liao Jingmei	15	15
(Japan) Aki Akao (Japan) Tomomi Matsuda	10	9

Quarter-finals
(China) Feng Chen (China) Pan Pan	5	15	10
(China) Tian Qing (China) Zhao Yunlei	15	6	15
(China) Cheng Shu (China) Liao Jingmei	5	5
(China) Gao Ling (China) Huang Sui	15	15

Semi-finals
(China) Tian Qing (China) Zhao Yunlei	9	3
(China) Gao Ling (China) Huang Sui	15	15

== Mixed doubles ==
=== Finals ===
Semi-finals
(China) Zhang Jun (China) Gao Ling	1	15	15
(China) Xie Zhongbo (China) Zhang Yawen	15	6	10
(Singapore) Hendri Kurniawan Saputra (Singapore) Li Yujia	13	15	15
(China) He Hanbin (China) Feng Chen	15	9	8

Final
(China) Zhang Jun (China) Gao Ling	15	17
(Singapore) Hendri Kurniawan Saputra (Singapore) Li Yujia	7	13

=== Top half ===
First Round
(Japan) Shintaro Ikeda (Japan) Miyuki Maeda	4	6
(China) Cao Liu (China) Pan Pan	15	15
(China) Xie Zhongbo (China) Zhang Yawen	15	15
(Japan) Shuichi Nakao (Japan) Tomomi Matsuda	5	3
(Singapore) Hendra Wijaya (Singapore) Jiang Yanmei	15	8	15
(China) Shen Ye (China) Liao Jingmei	4	15	13

Quarter-finals
(China) Zhang Jun (China) Gao Ling	15	15
(China) Cao Liu (China) Pan Pan	4	8
(China) Xie Zhongbo (China) Zhang Yawen	15	15
(Singapore) Hendra Wijaya (Singapore) Jiang Yanmei	11	6

Semi-finals
(China) Zhang Jun (China) Gao Ling	1	15	15
(China) Xie Zhongbo (China) Zhang Yawen	15	6	10

=== Bottom half ===
First Round
(Japan) Naoki Kawamae (Japan) Aki Akao	7	1
(China) Zhang Wei (China) Yu Yang	15	15
(China) Lu Jian (China) Zhao Yunlei	12	7
(Singapore) Hendri Kurniawan Saputra (Singapore) Li Yujia	15	15
(China) He Hanbin (China) Feng Chen	15	16	17
(Japan) Keita Masuda (Japan) Satoko Suetsuna	9	17	14
(China) Xu Chen (China) Tian Qing	15	17
(China) Zheng Bo (China) Zhao Tingting	9	15

Quarter-finals
(China) Zhang Wei (China) Yu Yang	12	12
(Singapore) Hendri Kurniawan Saputra (Singapore) Li Yujia	15	15
(China) He Hanbin (China) Feng Chen	15	15
(China) Xu Chen (China) Tian Qing	8	9

Semi-finals
(Singapore) Hendri Kurniawan Saputra (Singapore) Li Yujia	13	15	15
(China) He Hanbin (China) Feng Chen	15	9	8
