= 2004 Singapore Open =

Tournament details
- Dates: 15 November 2004– 21 November 2004
- Edition: 55th
- Level: World Grand Prix 5 Stars
- Total prize money: US$170,000
- Venue: Singapore Indoor Stadium
- Location: Kallang, Singapore

Champions
- Men's singles: (Denmark) Kenneth Jonassen
- Women's singles: (China) Zhang Ning
- Men's doubles: (Indonesia) Luluk Hadiyanto (Indonesia) Alvent Yulianto
- Women's doubles: (China) Yang Wei (China) Zhang Jiewen
- Mixed doubles: (Indonesia) Nova Widianto (Indonesia) Liliyana Natsir

The 2004 Singapore Open (officially known as the Aviva Open Singapore 2004 for sponsorship reasons) was a five-star badminton tournament that took place at the Singapore Indoor Stadium in Singapore, from November 15 to November 21, 2004. The total prize money on offer was US$170,000.

== Prize money distributions ==
Below is the prize money distributions for each round (all in USD). In doubles it is referred as the prize money per pair:

Category	Winner	Runner-up	Semi finalist	Quarter finalist	Last 8
Men's Singles	13,600	6,800	3,400	1,700	680
Women's Singles	11,730	5,610	3,060	1,530	
Men's Doubles	12,240	6,800	4,080	2,380	
Women's Doubles	10,370	6,800	3,740	1,870	
Mixed Doubles	10,370	6,800	3,740	1,870	

== Results ==
=== Men's singles ===
Quarterfinals
(Denmark) Peter Gade	5	13
(Malaysia) Lee Chong Wei	15	15
(Malaysia) Kuan Beng Hong	8	5
(China) Bao Chunlai	15	15
(China) Chen Hong	13	3
(Malaysia) Muhammad Hafiz Hashim	15	15
(Denmark) Kenneth Jonassen	15	15
(Hong Kong) Ng Wei	4	3

Semifinals
(Malaysia) Lee Chong Wei	3	15	17
(China) Bao Chunlai	15	9	15
(Malaysia) Muhammad Hafiz Hashim	11	15	11
(Denmark) Kenneth Jonassen	15	11	15

Finals
(Malaysia) Lee Chong Wei	15	15	4
(Denmark) Kenneth Jonassen	3	17	15

=== Women's singles ===
Quarterfinals
(Singapore) Xing Aiying	1	1
(Netherlands) Yao Jie	11	11
(China) Zhou Mi	11	11	11
(Japan) Kaori Mori	13	1	4
(France) Pi Hongyan	11	11	11
(Denmark) Tine Baun	9	13	9
(Chinese Taipei) Chen Li	3	2
(China) Zhang Ning	11	11

Semifinals
(Netherlands) Yao Jie	0	3
(China) Zhou Mi	11	11
(France) Pi Hongyan	2	6
(China) Zhang Ning	11	11

Finals
(China) Zhou Mi	8	1
(China) Zhang Ning	11	11

=== Men's doubles ===
Quarterfinals
(Indonesia) Alvent Yulianto Chandra (Indonesia) Luluk Hadiyanto	15	15
(Indonesia) Sigit Budiarto (Indonesia) Candra Wijaya	5	11
(Denmark) Lars Paaske (Denmark) Jonas Rasmussen	15	15
(Malaysia) Lin Woon Fui (Malaysia) Mohd Fairuzizuan Mohd Tazari	9	12
(Malaysia) Chan Chong Ming (Malaysia) Koo Kien Keat	15	15
(Denmark) Mathias Boe (Denmark) Carsten Mogensen	12	13
(South Korea) Han Sang-hoon (South Korea) Hwang Ji-man	8	8
(Denmark) Jens Eriksen (Denmark) Martin Lundgaard Hansen	15	15

Semifinals
(Indonesia) Alvent Yulianto Chandra (Indonesia) Luluk Hadiyanto	15	15
(Denmark) Lars Paaske (Denmark) Jonas Rasmussen	9	7
(Malaysia) Chan Chong Ming (Malaysia) Koo Kien Keat	6	15	8
(Denmark) Jens Eriksen (Denmark) Martin Lundgaard Hansen	15	5	15

Finals
(Indonesia) Alvent Yulianto Chandra (Indonesia) Luluk Hadiyanto	15	15
(Denmark) Jens Eriksen (Denmark) Martin Lundgaard Hansen	2	9

=== Women's doubles ===
Quarterfinals
(China) Yang Wei (China) Zhang Jiewen	13	17	15
(South Korea) Lee Hyo-jung (South Korea) Lee Kyung-won	15	14	1
(China) Gao Ling (China) Huang Sui	15	15
(Denmark) Pernille Harder (Denmark) Helle Nielsen	7	7
(Denmark) Rikke Olsen (Denmark) Mette Schjoldager	15	15
(England) Ella Tripp (England) Joanne Nicholas	11	0
(Thailand) Satinee Jankrajangwong (Thailand) Saralee Thoungthongkam	15	15
(Malaysia) Chin Eei Hui (Malaysia) Wong Pei Tty	9	5

Semifinals
(China) Yang Wei (China) Zhang Jiewen	15	15
(China) Gao Ling (China) Huang Sui	7	10
(Denmark) Rikke Olsen (Denmark) Mette Schjoldager	11	3
(Thailand) Satinee Jankrajangwong (Thailand) Saralee Thoungthongkam	15	15

Finals
(China) Yang Wei (China) Zhang Jiewen	15	9	15
(Thailand) Satinee Jankrajangwong (Thailand) Saralee Thoungthongkam	5	15	11

=== Mixed doubles ===
Quarterfinals
(England) Nathan Robertson (England) Gail Emms	15	15
(China) Zhang Jun (China) Gao Ling	13	12
(Indonesia) Nova Widianto (Indonesia) Liliyana Natsir	15	15
(South Korea) Kim Yong-hyun (South Korea) Lee Hyo-jung	11	3
(Malaysia) Koo Kien Keat (Malaysia) Wong Pei Tty	15	8	17
(Denmark) Jens Eriksen (Denmark) Mette Schjoldager	11	15	14
(Singapore) Hendri Kurniawan Saputra (Singapore) Li Yujia	15	10	15
(England) Robert Blair (England) Natalie Munt	11	15	10

Semifinals
(England) Nathan Robertson (England) Gail Emms	4	3
(Indonesia) Nova Widianto (Indonesia) Liliyana Natsir	15	15
(Malaysia) Koo Kien Keat (Malaysia) Wong Pei Tty	8	15	15
(Singapore) Hendri Kurniawan Saputra (Singapore) Li Yujia	15	11	13

Finals
(Indonesia) Nova Widianto (Indonesia) Liliyana Natsir	15	15
(Malaysia) Koo Kien Keat (Malaysia) Wong Pei Tty	1	4
