= Hwang Yu-mi =

South Korean badminton player

Personal information
- Born: 18 March 1983 (age 43) Seoul, South Korea
- Height: 1.65 m (5 ft 5 in)
- Weight: 57 kg (126 lb)

Sport
- Country: South Korea
- Sport: Badminton
- Handedness: Right
- Event: Women's doubles

Women's doubles
- BWF profile
Medal record
Women's badminton
Representing South Korea
Sudirman Cup
Bronze medal – third place	2007 Glasgow	Mixed team
Uber Cup
Silver medal – second place	2004 Jakarta	Women's team
Silver medal – second place	2002 Guangzhou	Women's team
Asian Games
Silver medal – second place	2002 Busan	Women's team
Bronze medal – third place	2002 Busan	Women's doubles
Bronze medal – third place	2006 Doha	Women's team
Asian Championships
Silver medal – second place	2003 Jakarta	Women's doubles
World Junior Championships
Silver medal – second place	2000 Guangzhou	Mixed team
Bronze medal – third place	2000 Guangzhou	Mixed doubles
Asia Junior Championships
Gold medal – first place	2001 Taipei	Girls' doubles
Gold medal – first place	2001 Taipei	Mixed doubles
Gold medal – first place	2001 Taipei	Girls' team
Silver medal – second place	2000 Kyoto	Girls' team
Silver medal – second place	1998 Kuala Lumpur	Girls' team
Bronze medal – third place	2000 Kyoto	Girls' doubles
Bronze medal – third place	2000 Kyoto	Mixed doubles
Bronze medal – third place	1999 Yangon	Girls' team
Bronze medal – third place	1999 Yangon	Mixed doubles

- Hwang Yu-mi
- Hangul: 황유미
- Hanja: 黃遊美
- RR: Hwang Yumi
- MR: Hwang Yumi

Hwang Yu-mi (Korean: 황유미; born 18 March 1983) is a South Korean former badminton player. She competed at the 2004 and 2008 Summer Olympics.

== Career ==
In 2003, she won the silver medal at the Asian Championships in the women's doubles event. Hwang competed for South Korea in badminton at the 2004 Summer Olympics in women's doubles with partner Lee Hyo-jung. They had a bye in the first round and defeated Cheng Wen-Hsing and Chien Yu Chin of Chinese Taipei in the second. In the quarterfinals, Hwang and Lee lost to Zhao Tingting and Wei Yili of China 8–15, 15–6, 15–13.

== Achievements ==
=== Asian Games ===
Women's doubles
Year	Venue	Partner	Opponent	Score	Result
2002	Gangseo Gymnasium; Busan, South Korea	(South Korea) Lee Hyo-jung	(China) Gao Ling (China) Huang Sui	2–11, 9–11	Bronze

=== Asian Championships ===
Women's doubles
Year	Venue	Partner	Opponent	Score	Result
2003	Tennis Indoor Gelora Bung Karno; Jakarta, Indonesia	(South Korea) Lee Hyo-jung	(South Korea) Ra Kyung-min (South Korea) Lee Kyung-won	9–15, 7–15	Silver

=== World Junior Championships ===
Mixed doubles
Year	Venue	Partner	Opponent	Score	Result
2000	Tianhe Gymnasium; Guangzhou, China	(South Korea) Lee Jae-jin	(China) Zheng Bo (China) Wei Yili	4–7, 4–7, 0–7	Bronze

=== Asian Junior Championships ===
Girls' doubles
Year	Venue	Partner	Opponent	Score	Result
2001	Taipei Gymnasium; Taipei, Taiwan	(South Korea) Cho A-ra	(Indonesia) Endang Nursugianti (Indonesia) Lita Nurlita	15–13, 15–11	Gold
2000	Nishiyama Park Gymnasium; Kyoto, Japan	(South Korea) Joo Hyun-hee	(China) Zhao Tingting (China) Li Yujia	9–15, 5–15	Bronze

Mixed doubles
Year	Venue	Partner	Opponent	Score	Result
2001	Taipei Gymnasium; Taipei, Taiwan	(South Korea) Lee Jae-jin	(South Korea) Hwang Ji-man (South Korea) Bae Seung-hee	15–7, 15–12	Gold
2000	Nishiyama Park Gymnasium; Kyoto, Japan	(South Korea) Lee Jae-jin	(China) Sang Yang (China) Zhang Yawen	8–15, 17–14, 14–17	Bronze
1999	National Indoor Stadium – 1 Yangon, Myanmar	(South Korea) Heo Hoon-hoi	(China) Zheng Bo (China) Wei Yili	5–15, 5–15	Bronze

=== BWF Grand Prix ===
The BWF Grand Prix has two levels: Grand Prix and Grand Prix Gold. It is a series of badminton tournaments, sanctioned by Badminton World Federation (BWF) since 2007. The World Badminton Grand Prix sanctioned by International Badminton Federation since 1983.

Women's doubles
Year	Tournament	Partner	Opponent	Score	Result
2003	Chinese Taipei Open	(South Korea) Lee Hyo-jung	(South Korea) Ra Kyung-min (South Korea) Lee Kyung-won	9–15, 8–15	(silver) Runner-up
2003	Dutch Open	(South Korea) Lee Hyo-jung	(South Korea) Ra Kyung-min (South Korea) Lee Kyung-won	4–15, 9–15	(silver) Runner-up
2002	Singapore Open	(South Korea) Lee Hyo-jung	(China) Huang Nanyan (China) Yang Wei	1–11, 8–11	(silver) Runner-up
2002	Chinese Taipei Open	(South Korea) Lee Hyo-jung	(Thailand) Saralee Thungthongkam (Thailand) Sathinee Chankrachangwong	11–4, 12–13, 8–11	(silver) Runner-up

Mixed doubles
Year	Tournament	Partner	Opponent	Score	Result
2007	Philippines Open	(South Korea) Han Sang-hoon	(Indonesia) Nova Widianto (Indonesia) Liliyana Natsir	17–21, 13–21	(silver) Runner-up
2007	Thailand Open	(South Korea) Han Sang-hoon	(China) He Hanbin (China) Yu Yang	12–21, 14–21	(silver) Runner-up
2006	Thailand Open	(South Korea) Lee Yong-dae	(Thailand) Sudket Prapakamol (Thailand) Saralee Thungthongkam	21–11, 18–21, 22–20	(gold) Winner
2002	Denmark Open	(South Korea) Kim Dong-moon	(Indonesia) Nova Widianto (Indonesia) Vita Marissa	11–6, 4–11, 11–7	(gold) Winner
2002	Dutch Open	(South Korea) Ha Tae-kwon	(South Korea) Kim Dong-moon (South Korea) Lee Kyung-won	9–11, 2–11	(silver) Runner-up

BWF Grand Prix Gold tournament
BWF Grand Prix tournament

=== BWF International Challenge/Series ===
Women's doubles
Year	Tournament	Partner	Opponent	Score	Result
2017	Romanian International	(South Korea) Kang Chan-hee	(South Korea) Lee Ji-hye (South Korea) Lim Soo-bin	21–17, 19–21, 21–18	(gold) Winner
2007	Canadian International	(South Korea) Ha Jung-eun	(South Korea) Joo Hyun-hee (South Korea) Oh Seul-ki	21–16, 21–7	(gold) Winner

Mixed doubles
Year	Tournament	Partner	Opponent	Score	Result
2008	Korean International	(South Korea) Hwang Ji-man	(South Korea) Lee Jae-jin (South Korea) Kim Jin-ock	15–21, 14–21	(silver) Runner-up

BWF International Challenge tournament
BWF International Series tournament
BWF Future Series tournament
