= 2003 Singapore Open =

Tournament details
- Dates: 19 August 2003– 24 August 2003
- Edition: 54th
- Level: World Grand Prix 5 Stars
- Total prize money: US$170,000
- Venue: Singapore Indoor Stadium
- Location: Kallang, Singapore

Champions
- Men's singles: (China) Chen Hong
- Women's singles: (China) Zhang Ning
- Men's doubles: (Denmark) Jens Eriksen (Denmark) Martin Lundgaard Hansen
- Women's doubles: (China) Yang Wei (China) Zhang Jiewen
- Mixed doubles: (South Korea) Kim Dong-moon (South Korea) Ra Kyung-min

The 2003 Singapore Open (officially known as the Yonex-Sunrise Singapore Open 2003 for sponsorship reasons) was a five-star badminton tournament that took place at the Singapore Indoor Stadium in Singapore, from August 19 to August 24, 2003. The total prize money on offer was US$170,000.

== Prize money distributions ==
Below is the prize money distributions for each round (all in USD). In doubles it is referred as the prize money per pair:

| Category | Winner | Runner-up | Semi finalist | Quarter finalist | Last 8 |
|---|---|---|---|---|---|
| Men's Singles | 13,600 | 6,800 | 3,400 | 1,700 | 680 |
| Women's Singles | 11,730 | 5,610 | 3,060 | 1,530 | |
| Men's Doubles | 12,240 | 6,800 | 4,080 | 2,380 | |
| Women's Doubles | 10,370 | 6,800 | 3,740 | 1,870 | |
| Mixed Doubles | 10,370 | 6,800 | 3,740 | 1,870 | |

== Results ==
=== Men's singles ===
Quarterfinals
(China) Chen Hong | 15 | 15
(Singapore) Ronald Susilo | 9 | 1
(China) Lin Dan | 15 | 15
(China) Bao Chunlai | 5 | 10
(China) Chen Yu | 9 | 15 | 15
(Singapore) Wiempie Mahardi | 15 | 2 | 4
(South Korea) Lee Hyun-il | 15 | 15
(Denmark) Peter Gade | 9 | 12

Semifinals
(China) Chen Hong | 15 | 15
(China) Lin Dan | 8 | 11
(China) Chen Yu | 15 | 15
(South Korea) Lee Hyun-il | 11 | 11

Finals
(China) Chen Hong | 11 | 15 | 15
(China) Chen Yu | 15 | 8 | 4

=== Women's singles ===
Quarterfinals
(China) Gong Ruina | 11 | 11
(France) Pi Hongyan | 0 | 9
(China) Zhou Mi | 6 | 11 | 13
(Netherlands) Mia Audina | 11 | 9 | 10
(Denmark) Camilla Martin | 11 | 11 | 11
(Hong Kong) Wang Chen | 13 | 3 | 8
(China) Xie Xingfang | 4 | 3
(China) Zhang Ning | 11 | 11

Semifinals
(China) Gong Ruina | 5 | 8
(China) Zhou Mi | 11 | 11
(Denmark) Camilla Martin | 8 | 11 | 5
(China) Zhang Ning | 11 | 9 | 11

Finals
(China) Zhou Mi | 0 | 8
(China) Zhang Ning | 11 | 11

=== Men's doubles ===
Quarterfinals
(Thailand) Tesana Panvisvas (Thailand) Pramote Teerawiwatana | 8 | 15 | 10
(England) Anthony Clark (England) Nathan Robertson | 15 | 10 | 15
(Denmark) Jens Eriksen (Denmark) Martin Lundgaard Hansen | w | / | o
(China) Sang Yang (China) Zheng Bo
(England) Eng Hian (England) Flandy Limpele | 8 | 6
(Malaysia) Choong Tan Fook (Malaysia) Lee Wan Wah | 15 | 15
(China) Chen Qiqiu (China) Cheng Rui | 6 | 3
(Denmark) Lars Paaske (Denmark) Jonas Rasmussen | 15 | 15

Semifinals
(England) Anthony Clark (England) Nathan Robertson | 15 | 5 | 13
(Denmark) Jens Eriksen (Denmark) Martin Lundgaard Hansen | 7 | 15 | 15
(Malaysia) Choong Tan Fook (Malaysia) Lee Wan Wah | 14 | 15 | 2
(Denmark) Lars Paaske (Denmark) Jonas Rasmussen | 17 | 12 | 15

Finals
(Denmark) Jens Eriksen (Denmark) Martin Lundgaard Hansen | 15 | 15
(Denmark) Lars Paaske (Denmark) Jonas Rasmussen | 9 | 10

=== Women's doubles ===
Quarterfinals
(China) Gao Ling (China) Huang Sui | 15 | 15
(South Korea) Joo Hyun-hee (South Korea) Yim Kyung-jin | 5 | 0
(South Korea) Lee Kyung-won (South Korea) Ra Kyung-min | 15 | 15
(Netherlands) Mia Audina (Netherlands) Lotte Jonathans | 9 | 11
(China) Yang Wei (China) Zhang Jiewen | 15 | 15
(Denmark) Pernille Harder (Denmark) Ann-Lou Jørgensen | 7 | 4
(Japan) Chikako Nakayama (Japan) Keiko Yoshitomi | 10 | 0
(China) Wei Yili (China) Zhao Tingting | 15 | 15

Semifinals
(China) Gao Ling (China) Huang Sui | 15 | 15
(South Korea) Lee Kyung-won (South Korea) Ra Kyung-min | 3 | 4
(China) Yang Wei (China) Zhang Jiewen | 15 | 15
(China) Wei Yili (China) Zhao Tingting | 5 | 11

Finals
(China) Gao Ling (China) Huang Sui | 16 | 7
(China) Yang Wei (China) Zhang Jiewen | 17 | 15

=== Mixed doubles ===
Quarterfinals
(China) Zhang Jun (China) Gao Ling | 8 | 8
(South Korea) Kim Dong-moon (South Korea) Ra Kyung-min | 15 | 15
(Thailand) Sudket Prapakamol (Thailand) Saralee Thoungthongkam | 15 | 15
(England) Anthony Clark (Scotland) Kirsteen McEwan | 4 | 8
(Indonesia) Nova Widianto (Indonesia) Vita Marissa | 15 | 15
(Denmark) Mathias Boe (Denmark) Helle Nielsen | 8 | 5
(China) Zheng Bo (China) Zhang Jiewen | 15 | 15
(South Korea) Kim Yong-hyun (South Korea) Lee Hyo-jung | 9 | 3

Semifinals
(South Korea) Kim Dong-moon (South Korea) Ra Kyung-min | 15 | 15
(Thailand) Sudket Prapakamol (Thailand) Saralee Thoungthongkam | 5 | 3
(Indonesia) Nova Widianto (Indonesia) Vita Marissa | 13 | 6
(China) Zheng Bo (China) Zhang Jiewen | 15 | 15

Finals
(South Korea) Kim Dong-moon (South Korea) Ra Kyung-min | 15 | 15
(China) Zheng Bo (China) Zhang Jiewen | 5 | 9
