= 2006 IBF World Championships – Women's doubles =

Women's doubles at the 2006 IBF World Championships
- Venue: Palacio de Deportes de la Comunidad de Madrid
- Location: Madrid, Spain
- Dates: September 18, 2006 – September 24, 2006

Medalists
gold medal	Gao Ling; Huang Sui	China
silver medal	Zhang Yawen; Wei Yili	China
bronze medal	Yang Wei; Zhang Jiewen	China
bronze medal	Du Jing; Yu Yang	China

The 2006 Women's doubles brackets and results of the 2006 IBF World Championships.

== Results ==
=== Section 1 ===
First Round
1	(China) Gao Ling (China) Huang Sui
Bye; Bye
(Canada) Valerie Loker (Canada) Sarah MacMaster
Bye; Bye
9/16	(Indonesia) Jo Novita (Indonesia) Greysia Polii	21	19	21
(Netherlands) Rachel van Cutsen (Netherlands) Paulien van Dooremalen	10	21	9
(Russia) Evgenia Dimova (Russia) Anna Efremova
(Estonia) Piret Hamer (Estonia) Helen Reino	WO	WO
5/8	(Chinese Taipei) Chien Yu-chin (Chinese Taipei) Cheng Wen-hsing
Bye; Bye
(Spain) Silvia Riera (Spain) Patricia Pérez
Bye; Bye
9/16	(Denmark) Mette Schjoldager (Denmark) Britta Andersen
(Switzerland) Sabrina Jaquet (Switzerland) Corinne Jörg	WO	WO
(Scotland) Imogen Bankier (Scotland) Emma Mason	16	18
(Malaysia) Ooi Sock Ai (Malaysia) Mooi Hing Yau	21	21

Second Round
1	(China) Gao (China) Huang	21	21
(Canada) Loker (Canada) MacMaster	6	6
9/16	(Indonesia) Novita (Indonesia) Polii	21	21
(Estonia) Hamer (Estonia) Reino	5	11
5/8	(Chinese Taipei) Chien (Chinese Taipei) Cheng	21	21
(Spain) Riera (Spain) Pérez	15	8
(Switzerland) Jaquet (Switzerland) Jörg	13	22	9
(Malaysia) Ooi (Malaysia) Mooi	21	20	21

Third Round
1	(China) Gao (China) Huang	21	21
9/16	(Indonesia) Novita (Indonesia) Polii	11	17
5/8	(Chinese Taipei) Chien (Chinese Taipei) Cheng	21	23
(Malaysia) Ooi (Malaysia) Mooi	15	21

Quarter Finals
1	(China) Gao (China) Huang	21	22
5/8	(Chinese Taipei) Chien (Chinese Taipei) Cheng	11	20

=== Section 2 ===
First Round
3/4	(South Korea) Lee Hyo-jung (South Korea) Lee Kyung-won
Bye; Bye
(India) Shruti S. Kurian (India) Jwala Gutta
Bye; Bye
9/16	(Japan) Kumiko Ogura (Japan) Reiko Shiota	21	21
(Iran) Behnaz Pirzamanbin (Iran) Negin Amiripour	8	6
(Malaysia) Fong Chew Yen (Malaysia) See Phui Leng	21	21
(Poland) Małgorzata Kurdelska (Poland) Paulina Matusewicz	15	14
5/8	(China) Du Jing (China) Yu Yang
Bye; Bye
(England) Joanne Nicholas (England) Natalie Munt	21	21
(Peru) Cristina Aicardi (Peru) Claudia Rivero	7	7
9/16	(Sweden) Johanna Persson (Sweden) Elin Bergblom	21	18	21
(Bulgaria) Diana Dimova (Bulgaria) Petya Nedeltcheva	16	21	16
(Thailand) Duanganong Aroonkesorn (Thailand) Kunchala Vorawichitchaikul	21	16	21
(Malaysia) Lim Pek Siah (Malaysia) Chor Hooi Yee	17	21	17

Second Round
3/4	(South Korea) Lee (South Korea) Lee
(India) Kurian (India) Gutta	WO	WO
9/16	(Japan) Ogura (Japan) Shiota	21	21
(Malaysia) Fong (Malaysia) See	11	11
5/8	(China) Du (China) Yu	21	21
(England) Nicholas (England) Munt	11	11
9/16	(Sweden) Persson (Sweden) Bergblom	21	21
(Thailand) Aroonkesorn (Thailand) Vorawichitchaikul	18	12

Third Round
(India) Kurian (India) Gutta	11	14
9/16	(Japan) Ogura (Japan) Shiota	21	21
5/8	(China) Du (China) Yu	21	21
9/16	(Sweden) Persson (Sweden) Bergblom	12	17

Quarter Finals
9/16	(Japan) Ogura (Japan) Shiota	11	13
5/8	(China) Du (China) Yu	21	21

=== Section 3 ===
First Round
(Japan) Miyuki Maeda (Japan) Satoko Suetsuna	21	21
(Russia) Valeria Sorokina (Russia) Nina Vislova	9	13
(Switzerland) Anna Larchenko (Switzerland) Huwaina Razi
9/16	(Poland) Kamila Augustyn (Poland) Nadieżda Kostiuczyk	w	/	o
(Slovenia) Maja Kersnik (Slovenia) Maja Tvrdy	21	19	21
(Turkey) Öznur Çalışkan (Turkey) Nursel Doğan	7	21	16
Bye; Bye
5/8	(Malaysia) Wong Pei Tty (Malaysia) Chin Eei Hui
(India) B. R. Meenakshi (India) Trupti Murgunde	21	14	22
(Canada) Amelie Felx (Canada) Florence Lavoie	12	21	20
(Germany) Birgit Overzier (Germany) Carina Mette	7	10
9/16	(China) Zhang Yawen (China) Wei Yili	21	21
Bye; Bye
(Chinese Taipei) Chou Chia-chi (Chinese Taipei) Ku Pei-ting
Bye; Bye
3/4	(England) Gail Emms (England) Donna Kellogg

Second Round
(Japan) Maeda (Japan) Suetsuna	17	12
9/16	(Poland) Augustyn (Poland) Kostiuczyk	21	21
(Slovenia) Kersnik (Slovenia) Tvrdy	7	5
5/8	(Malaysia) Wong (Malaysia) Chin	21	21
(India) Meenakshi (India) Murgunde	2	7
9/16	(China) Zhang (China) Wei	21	21
(Chinese Taipei) Chou (Chinese Taipei) Ku	12	14
3/4	(England) Emms (England) Kellogg	21	21

Third Round
9/16	(Poland) Augustyn (Poland) Kostiuczyk	14	11
5/8	(Malaysia) Wong (Malaysia) Chin	21	21
9/16	(China) Zhang (China) Wei	21	21
3/4	(England) Emms (England) Kellogg	19	12

Quarter Finals
5/8	(Malaysia) Wong (Malaysia) Chin	14	21	13
9/16	(China) Zhang (China) Wei	21	19	21

=== Section 4 ===
First Round
(Croatia) Morana Esih (Croatia) Matea Čiča	19	17
(Finland) Anu Nieminen (Finland) Nina Weckström	21	21
(Russia) Anastasia Russkikh (Russia) Ekaterina Ananina	13	23	15
9/16	(Japan) Aki Akao (Japan) Tomomi Matsuda	21	21	21
Bye; Bye
(Nigeria) Grace Daniel (Nigeria) Susan Ideh
Bye; Bye
5/8	(Thailand) Saralee Thungthongkam (Thailand) Sathinee Chankrachangwong
(Singapore) Jiang Yanmei (Singapore) Li Yujia	21	21
(Sweden) Emelie Lennartsson (Sweden) Sophia Hansson	12	13
(South Korea) Ha Jung-eun (South Korea) Hwang Yu-mi	20	21	17
9/16	(Denmark) Lena Frier Kristiansen (Denmark) Kamilla Rytter Juhl	22	18	21
Bye; Bye
(France) Élodie Eymard (France) Weny Rahmawati
Bye; Bye
2	(China) Yang Wei (China) Zhang Jiewen

Second Round
(Finland) Nieminen (Finland) Weckström	19	17
9/16	(Japan) Akao (Japan) Matsuda	21	21
(Nigeria) Daniel (Nigeria) Ideh	10	9
5/8	(Thailand) Thungthongkam (Thailand) Chankrachangwong	21	21
(Singapore) Jiang (Singapore) Li	23	21
(Denmark) Frier Kristiansen (Denmark) Rytter Juhl	21	15
(France) Eymard (France) Rahmawati	14	8
2	(China) Yang (China) Zhang	21	21

Third Round
9/16	(Japan) Akao (Japan) Matsuda	11	4
5/8	(Thailand) Thungthongkam (Thailand) Chankrachangwong	21	21
(Singapore) Jiang (Singapore) Li	10	14
2	(China) Yang (China) Zhang	21	21

Quarter Finals
(Thailand) Thungthongkam (Thailand) Chankrachangwong	12	14
2	(China) Yang (China) Zhang	21	21

== Finals ==
Quarterfinals
1	(China) Gao Ling (China) Huang Sui	21	22
5/8	(Chinese Taipei) Chien Yu-chin (Chinese Taipei) Cheng Wen-hsing	11	20
9/16	(Japan) Kumiko Ogura (Japan) Reiko Shiota	11	13
5/8	(China) Du Jing (China) Yu Yang	21	21
5/8	(Malaysia) Wong Pei Tty (Malaysia) Chin Eei Hui	14	21	13
9/16	(China) Zhang Yawen (China) Wei Yili	21	19	21
5/8	(Thailand) Saralee Thungthongkam (Thailand) Sathinee Chankrachangwong	12	14
2	(China) Yang Wei (China) Zhang Jiewen	21	21

Semifinals
1	(China) Gao Ling (China) Huang Sui	18	22	21
5/8	(China) Du Jing (China) Yu Yang	21	20	17
9/16	(China) Zhang Yawen (China) Wei Yili	21	21
2	(China) Yang Wei (China) Zhang Jiewen	14	19

Finals
1	(China) Gao Ling (China) Huang Sui	23	21
9/16	(China) Zhang Yawen (China) Wei Yili	21	9
