= 2002 Indonesia Open (badminton) =

Tournament details
- Dates: 26 August 2002 – 1 September 2002
- Edition: 21st
- Level: World Grand Prix 5 Stars
- Total prize money: US$170,000
- Venue: GOR Kertajaya Surabaya
- Location: Surabaya, Indonesia

Champions
- Men's singles: (Indonesia) Taufik Hidayat
- Women's singles: (China) Gong Ruina
- Men's doubles: (South Korea) Lee Dong-soo (South Korea) Yoo Yong-sung
- Women's doubles: (China) Gao Ling (China) Huang Sui
- Mixed doubles: (Indonesia) Bambang Suprianto (Indonesia) Minarti Timur

The 2002 Indonesia Open (officially known as the Sanyo Indonesia Open 2002 for sponsorship reasons) was a five-star Grand Prix badminton tournament that was held in Surabaya, from August 26 to September 1, 2002, with a total prize money of US$170,000. It was the 21st edition of the Indonesia Open.

== Venue ==
- GOR Kertajaya Indah

== Final results ==
Category	Winners	Runners-up	Score
Men's singles	(Indonesia) Taufik Hidayat	(China) Chen Hong	15–12, 15–12
Women's singles	(China) Gong Ruina	(China) Zhang Ning	11–6, 11–7
Men's doubles	(South Korea) Lee Dong-soo & Yoo Yong-sung	(England) Flandy Limpele & Eng Hian	15–10, 15–11
Women's doubles	(China) Gao Ling & Huang Sui	(Thailand) Sujitra Ekmongkolpaisarn & Saralee Thungthongkam	11–5, 11–4
Mixed doubles	(Indonesia) Bambang Suprianto & Minarti Timur	(Indonesia) Nova Widianto & Vita Marissa	11–7, 11–3

=== Men's singles ===
Quarterfinals
(China) Bao Chunlai	15	15
(Indonesia) Taufiq Akbar Hidayat	9	8
(China) Chen Hong	15	15
(Indonesia) Sony Dwi Kuncoro	5	9
(Thailand) Boonsak Ponsana	12	15	12
(Indonesia) Rony Agustinus	15	11	15
(Malaysia) Sairul Amar Ayob	15	13	6
(Indonesia) Taufik Hidayat	12	15	15

Semifinals
(China) Bao Chunlai	10	2
(China) Chen Hong	15	15
(Indonesia) Rony Agustinus	12	9
(Indonesia) Taufik Hidayat	15	15

Final
(China) Chen Hong	12	12
(Indonesia) Taufik Hidayat	15	15

=== Women's singles ===
Quarterfinals
(China) Gong Ruina	6	11	11
(South Korea) Kim Kyeung-ran	11	2	4
(China) Xie Xingfang	9	11	12
(China) Zhou Mi	11	6	13
(China) Dai Yun	7	11	11
(Denmark) Camilla Martin	11	7	7
(Thailand) Sujitra Ekmongkolpaisarn	11	8	1
(China) Zhang Ning	1	11	11

Semifinals
(China) Gong Ruina	11	11
(China) Zhou Mi	2	4
(China) Dai Yun	2	9
(China) Zhang Ning	11	11

Final
(China) Gong Ruina	11	11
(China) Zhang Ning	6	7

Preceded by 2001 Indonesia Open	Indonesia Open	Succeeded by 2003 Indonesia Open
