= Gao Ling =

Chinese badminton player

Gao Ling 高崚
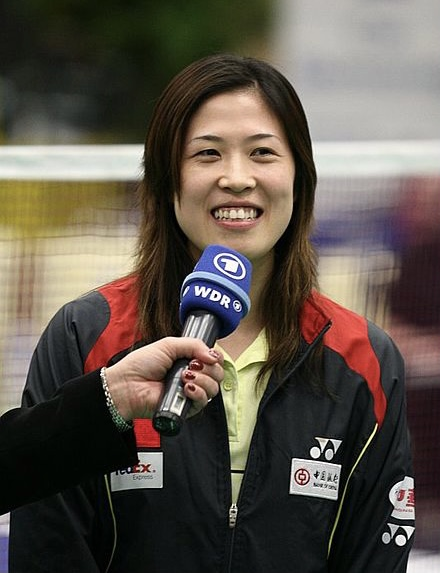

Personal information
- Nicknames: Laughing Auntie (大笑姑婆)
- Born: 14 March 1979 (age 47) Wuhan, Hubei, China
- Height: 168 cm (5 ft 6 in)
- Weight: 58 kg (128 lb)

Sport
- Country: China
- Sport: Badminton
- Handedness: Right

Women's & mixed doubles
- Highest ranking: 1
- BWF profile
Medal record
Badminton
Representing China
Olympic Games
Gold medal – first place	2000 Sydney	Mixed doubles
Gold medal – first place	2004 Athens	Mixed doubles
Silver medal – second place	2004 Athens	Women's doubles
Bronze medal – third place	2000 Sydney	Women's doubles
World Championships
Gold medal – first place	2001 Seville	Women's doubles
Gold medal – first place	2001 Seville	Mixed doubles
Gold medal – first place	2003 Birmingham	Women's doubles
Gold medal – first place	2006 Madrid	Women's doubles
Silver medal – second place	2003 Birmingham	Mixed doubles
Silver medal – second place	2005 Anaheim	Women's doubles
Silver medal – second place	2007 Kuala Lumpur	Women's doubles
Silver medal – second place	2007 Kuala Lumpur	Mixed doubles
Bronze medal – third place	1999 Copenhagen	Women's doubles
World Cup
Gold medal – first place	2006 Yiyang	Women's doubles
Bronze medal – third place	2006 Yiyang	Mixed doubles
Sudirman Cup
Gold medal – first place	2001 Seville	Mixed team
Gold medal – first place	2005 Beijing	Mixed team
Gold medal – first place	2007 Glasgow	Mixed team
Silver medal – second place	2003 Eindhoven	Mixed team
Uber Cup
Gold medal – first place	2000 Kuala Lumpur	Women's team
Gold medal – first place	2002 Guangzhou	Women's team
Gold medal – first place	2004 Jakarta	Women's team
Gold medal – first place	2006 Tokyo	Women's team
Gold medal – first place	2008 Jakarta	Women's team
Asian Games
Gold medal – first place	2002 Busan	Women's team
Gold medal – first place	2006 Doha	Women's doubles
Gold medal – first place	2006 Doha	Mixed doubles
Gold medal – first place	2006 Doha	Women's team
Silver medal – second place	2002 Busan	Women's doubles
Asia Championships
Gold medal – first place	2001 Manila	Women's doubles
Gold medal – first place	2002 Bangkok	Mixed doubles
Silver medal – second place	2002 Bangkok	Women's doubles
World Junior Championships
Gold medal – first place	1996 Silkeborg	Girls' doubles
Silver medal – second place	1996 Silkeborg	Mixed doubles
Asia Junior Championships
Gold medal – first place	1997 Manila	Girls' doubles
Gold medal – first place	1997 Manila	Mixed doubles
Gold medal – first place	1997 Manila	Girls' team

Gao Ling (Chinese: 高崚; pinyin: Gāo Líng; born 14 March 1979) is a Chinese former badminton player.

== Career ==
Noted for her consistency, anticipation, forecourt prowess, and sporting smile, Gao is one of the most successful doubles players in the history of women's badminton. Her four Olympic badminton medals are the most of any player.

She has won titles at almost every top tier tournament in the world. Gao has earned four gold medals (among nine medals in total) at the BWF World Championships, three of them in women's doubles with Huang Sui (2001, 2003, and 2006) and one of them in mixed doubles with Zhang Jun (2001). She and Zhang Jun won consecutive gold medals in mixed doubles at the 2000 and 2004 Olympics, overcoming severe tests in both.

Gao has not earned an Olympic gold medal in women's doubles, a relative gap in her resume, but earned a bronze medal in 2000 with Qin Yiyuan, and a silver medal with Huang Sui in 2004. From 2001 through 2006 she and Huang captured a record six consecutive women's doubles titles at the venerable All-England Championships. Their All-England streak was finally broken in the semifinals of the 2007 tournament by fellow countrywomen Zhang Yawen and Wei Yili. Gao has shared five All-England mixed doubles titles: three with Zhang Jun (2001, 2003, and 2006), and two with Zheng Bo (2007 and 2008).

She has been a member of the perennial world champion Chinese Uber Cup (women's international) team since 2000. Gao Ling received an award during a ceremony to mark her retirement with five other teammates from the Chinese national badminton team on the sidelines of the China Open badminton event in Shanghai, November 23, 2008. However, she was still playing a year later by partnering with Wei Yili. They lost to Yang Wei and Zhang Jiewen in the Thailand Open final of 2009, but won the Philippines Open of 2009.

== Achievements ==
=== Olympic Games ===
Women's doubles
Year	Venue	Partner	Opponent	Score	Result
2000	The Dome; Sydney, Australia	(China) Qin Yiyuan	(South Korea) Chung Jae-hee (South Korea) Ra Kyung-min	15–10, 15–4	Bronze
2004	Goudi Olympic Hall; Athens, Greece	(China) Huang Sui	(China) Yang Wei (China) Zhang Jiewen	15–7, 4–15, 8–15	Silver

Mixed doubles
Year	Venue	Partner	Opponent	Score	Result
2000	The Dome; Sydney, Australia	(China) Zhang Jun	(Indonesia) Trikus Haryanto (Indonesia) Minarti Timur	1–15, 15–13, 15–11	Gold
2004	Goudi Olympic Hall; Athens, Greece	(China) Zhang Jun	(United Kingdom) Nathan Robertson (United Kingdom) Gail Emms	15–1, 12–15, 15–12	Gold

=== World Championships ===
Women's doubles
Year	Venue	Partner	Opponent	Score	Result
2007	Putra Indoor Stadium; Kuala Lumpur, Malaysia	(China) Huang Sui	(China) Yang Wei (China) Zhang Jiewen	16–21, 19–21	Silver
2006	Palacio de Deportes de la Comunidad de Madrid; Madrid, Spain	(China) Huang Sui	(China) Zhang Yawen (China) Wei Yili	23–21, 21–9	Gold
2005	Arrowhead Pond; Anaheim, United States	(China) Huang Sui	(China) Yang Wei (China) Zhang Jiewen	16–17, 7–15	Silver
2003	National Indoor Arena; Birmingham, England	(China) Huang Sui	(China) Wei Yili (China) Zhao Tingting	15–8, 15–11	Gold
2001	Palacio de Deportes de San Pablo; Seville, Spain	(China) Huang Sui	(China) Zhang Jiewen (China) Wei Yili	15–11, 17–15	Gold
1999	Brøndbyhallen; Copenhagen, Denmark	(China) Qin Yiyuan	(China) Ge Fei (China) Gu Jun	6–15, 7–15	Bronze

Mixed doubles
Year	Venue	Partner	Opponent	Score	Result
2007	Putra Indoor Stadium; Kuala Lumpur, Malaysia	(China) Zheng Bo	(Indonesia) Nova Widianto (Indonesia) Liliyana Natsir	16–21, 14–21	Silver
2003	National Indoor Arena; Birmingham, England	(China) Zhang Jun	(South Korea) Kim Dong-moon (South Korea) Ra Kyung-min	7–15, 8–15	Silver
2001	Palacio de Deportes de San Pablo; Seville, Spain	(China) Zhang Jun	(South Korea) Kim Dong-moon (South Korea) Ra Kyung-min	15–10, 12–15, 17–16	Gold

=== World Cup ===
Women's doubles
Year	Venue	Partner	Opponent	Score	Result
2006	Olympic Park, Yiyang, China	(China) Huang Sui	(China) Yang Wei (China) Zhang Jiewen	21–19, 21–6	Gold

Mixed doubles
Year	Venue	Partner	Opponent	Score	Result
2006	Olympic Park, Yiyang, China	(China) Zhang Jun	(Indonesia) Nova Widianto (Indonesia) Liliyana Natsir	15–21, 16–21	Bronze

=== Asian Games ===
Women's doubles
Year	Venue	Partner	Opponent	Score	Result
2006	Aspire Hall 3 Doha, Qatar	(China) Huang Sui	(China) Yang Wei (China) Zhang Jiewen	18–21, 23–21, 21–14	Gold
2002	Gangseo Gymnasium; Busan, South Korea	(China) Huang Sui	(South Korea) Lee Kyung-won (South Korea) Ra Kyung-min	8–11, 7–11	Silver

Mixed doubles
Year	Venue	Partner	Opponent	Score	Result
2006	Aspire Hall 3 Doha, Qatar	(China) Zheng Bo	(China) Xie Zhongbo (China) Zhang Yawen	21–16, 25–23	Gold

=== Asian Championships ===
Women's doubles
Year	Venue	Partner	Opponent	Score	Result
2002	Bangkok, Thailand	(China) Huang Sui	(China) Yang Wei (China) Zhang Jiewen	8–11, 6–11	Silver
2001	Manila, Philippines	(China) Huang Sui	(Indonesia) Deyana Lomban (Indonesia) Vita Marissa	12–15, 15–4, 15–6	Gold

Mixed doubles
Year	Venue	Partner	Opponent	Score	Result
2002	Bangkok, Thailand	(China) Zhang Jun	(Thailand) Khunakorn Sudhisodhi (Thailand) Saralee Thungthongkam	11–7, 11–8	Gold

=== World Junior Championships ===
Girls' doubles
Year	Venue	Partner	Opponent	Score	Result
1996	Silkeborg Hallerne; Silkeborg, Denmark	(China) Yang Wei	(China) Lu Ying (China) Zhan Xubin	15–12, 15–8	Gold

Mixed doubles
Year	Venue	Partner	Opponent	Score	Result
1996	Silkeborg Hallerne; Silkeborg, Denmark	(China) Cheng Rui	(China) Wang Wei (China) Lu Ying	4–15, 10–15	Silver

=== Asian Junior Championships ===
Girls' doubles
Year	Venue	Partner	Opponent	Score	Result
1997	Ninoy Aquino Stadium; Manila, Philippines	(China) Yang Wei	(Malaysia) Chor Hooi Yee (Malaysia) Lim Pek Siah	15–10, 15–8	Gold

Mixed doubles
Year	Venue	Partner	Opponent	Score	Result
1997	Ninoy Aquino Stadium; Manila, Philippines	(China) Cheng Rui	(Malaysia) Chan Chong Ming (Malaysia) Lim Pek Siah	15–7, 15–9	Gold

=== BWF Superseries (11 titles, 3 runner-ups) ===
The BWF Superseries, launched on 14 December 2006 and implemented in 2007, is a series of elite badminton tournaments, sanctioned by Badminton World Federation (BWF). BWF Superseries has two level such as Superseries and Superseries Premier. A season of Superseries features twelve tournaments around the world, which introduced since 2011, with successful players invited to the Superseries Finals held at the year end.

Women's doubles
Year	Tournament	Partner	Opponent	Score	Result
2008	Korea Open	(China) Zhao Tingting	(China) Du Jing (China) Yu Yang	15–21, 13–21	(silver) Runner-up
2008	Malaysia Open	(China) Zhao Tingting	(China) Yang Wei (China) Zhang Jiewen	13–21, 21–16, 22–24	(silver) Runner-up
2007	China Open	(China) Zhao Tingting	(China) Du Jing (China) Yu Yang	17–21, 21–15, 21–8	(gold) Winner
2007	Korea Open	(China) Huang Sui	(China) Yang Wei (China) Zhang Jiewen	12–21, 21–14, 21–16	(gold) Winner
2007	Malaysia Open	(China) Huang Sui	(Indonesia) Greysia Polii (Indonesia) Vita Marissa	19–21, 21–12, 21–11	(gold) Winner

Mixed doubles
Year	Tournament	Partner	Opponent	Score	Result
2008	Indonesia Open	(China) Zheng Bo	(Denmark) Thomas Laybourn (Denmark) Kamilla Rytter Juhl	21–14, 21–8	(gold) Winner
2008	All England Open	(China) Zheng Bo	(Indonesia) Nova Widianto (Indonesia) Liliyana Natsir	18–21, 21–14, 21–9	(gold) Winner
2007	Hong Kong Open	(China) Zheng Bo	(Indonesia) Nova Widianto (Indonesia) Liliyana Natsir	23–21, 18–21, 19–21	(silver) Runner-up
2007	Japan Open	(China) Zheng Bo	(Indonesia) Nova Widianto (Indonesia) Liliyana Natsir	21–19, 21–14	(gold) Winner
2007	China Masters	(China) Zheng Bo	(England) Anthony Clark (England) Donna Kellogg	21–16, 21–17	(gold) Winner
2007	Indonesia Open	(China) Zheng Bo	(Indonesia) Nova Widianto (Indonesia) Liliyana Natsir	21–16, 21–11	(gold) Winner
2007	All England Open	(China) Zheng Bo	(England) Anthony Clark (England) Donna Kellogg	16–21, 21–18, 21–14	(gold) Winner
2007	Korea Open	(China) Zheng Bo	(Denmark) Thomas Laybourn (Denmark) Kamilla Rytter Juhl	22–20, 21–19	(gold) Winner
2007	Malaysia Open	(China) Zheng Bo	(England) Nathan Robertson (England) Gail Emms	21–12, 14–21, 21–15	(gold) Winner

BWF Super Series Finals tournament
BWF Super Series Premier tournament
BWF Super Series tournament

=== BWF Grand Prix (40 titles, 27 runner-ups) ===
The BWF Grand Prix has two levels, the Grand Prix Gold and Grand Prix. It is a series of badminton tournaments, sanctioned by the Badminton World Federation (BWF) since 2007. The World Badminton Grand Prix has been sanctioned by the International Badminton Federation since 1983.

Women's doubles
Year	Tournament	Partner	Opponent	Score	Result
2009	Thailand Open	(China) Wei Yili	(China) Yang Wei (China) Zhang Jiewen	24–22, 17–21, 15–21	(silver) Runner-up
2009	Philippines Open	(China) Wei Yili	(Indonesia) Shendy Puspa Irawati (Indonesia) Meiliana Jauhari	21–11, 21–11	(gold) Winner
2007	Macau Open	(China) Huang Sui	(South Korea) Lee Kyung-won (South Korea) Lee Hyo-jung	21–15, 21–7	(gold) Winner
2007	Thailand Open	(China) Huang Sui	(China) Du Jing (China) Yu Yang	Walkover	(gold) Winner
2006	Japan Open	(China) Huang Sui	(China) Zhang Yawen (China) Wei Yili	21–15, 21–17	(gold) Winner
2006	Hong Kong Open	(China) Huang Sui	(China) Yang Wei (China) Zhang Jiewen	19–21, 21–15, 19–21	(silver) Runner-up
2006	Macau Open	(China) Huang Sui	(South Korea) Lee Hyo-jung (South Korea) Lee Kyung-won	17–21, 21–14, 21–14	(gold) Winner
2006	Chinese Taipei Open	(China) Huang Sui	(South Korea) Lee Hyo-jung (South Korea) Lee Kyung-won	18–21, 21–9, 17–21	(silver) Runner-up
2006	Malaysia Open	(China) Huang Sui	(China) Du Jing (China) Yu Yang	9–21, 21–16, 21–17	(gold) Winner
2006	China Masters	(China) Huang Sui	(China) Zhang Yawen (China) Wei Yili	21–12, 18–21, 21–14	(gold) Winner
2006	All England Open	(China) Huang Sui	(China) Yang Wei (China) Zhang Jiewen	6–15, 15–11, 15–2	(gold) Winner
2006	German Open	(China) Huang Sui	(China) Yang Wei (China) Zhang Jiewen	15–3, 11–15, 10–15	(silver) Runner-up
2005	China Open	(China) Huang Sui	(China) Yang Wei (China) Zhang Jiewen	10–15, 4–15	(silver) Runner-up
2005	Hong Kong Open	(China) Huang Sui	(China) Yang Wei (China) Zhang Jiewen	13–15, 15–8, 6–15	(silver) Runner-up
2005	China Masters	(China) Huang Sui	(China) Du Jing (China) Yu Yang	4–15, 14–17	(silver) Runner-up
2005	Malaysia Open	(China) Huang Sui	(China) Yang Wei (China) Zhang Jiewen	6–15, 8–15	(silver) Runner-up
2005	Singapore Open	(China) Huang Sui	(China) Zhang Dan (China) Zhang Yawen	13–15, 10–15	(silver) Runner-up
2005	All England Open	(China) Huang Sui	(China) Wei Yili (China) Zhao Tingting	15–10, 15–13	(gold) Winner
2005	German Open	(China) Huang Sui	(China) Wei Yili (China) Zhao Tingting	15–4, 15–10	(gold) Winner
2004	Malaysia Open	(China) Huang Sui	(China) Yang Wei (China) Zhang Jiewen	7–15, 6–15	(silver) Runner-up
2004	All England Open	(China) Huang Sui	(China) Yang Wei (China) Zhang Jiewen	Walkover	(gold) Winner
2004	Swiss Open	(China) Huang Sui	(China) Yang Wei (China) Zhang Jiewen	Walkover	(gold) Winner
2003	China Open	(China) Huang Sui	(China) Yang Wei (China) Zhang Jiewen	15–8, 15–12	(gold) Winner
2003	Hong Kong Open	(China) Huang Sui	(China) Yang Wei (China) Zhang Jiewen	17–14, 15–5	(gold) Winner
2003	Malaysia Open	(China) Huang Sui	(China) Yang Wei (China) Zhang Jiewen	5–15, 15–1, 15–17	(silver) Runner-up
2003	Indonesia Open	(China) Huang Sui	(China) Yang Wei (China) Zhang Jiewen	Walkover	(gold) Winner
2003	Singapore Open	(China) Huang Sui	(China) Yang Wei (China) Zhang Jiewen	16–17, 7–15	(silver) Runner-up
2003	Japan Open	(China) Huang Sui	(China) Wei Yili (China) Zhao Tingting	10–13, 11–6, 11–5	(gold) Winner
2003	All England Open	(China) Huang Sui	(China) Yang Wei (China) Zhang Jiewen	11–9, 11–7	(gold) Winner
2002	China Open	(China) Huang Sui	(China) Wei Yili (China) Zhao Tingting	11–9, 11–3	(gold) Winner
2002	Indonesia Open	(China) Huang Sui	(Thailand) Sujitra Ekmongkolpaisarn (Thailand) Saralee Thungthongkam	11–5, 11–4	(gold) Winner
2002	Japan Open	(China) Huang Sui	(South Korea) Lee Kyung-won (South Korea) Ra Kyung-min	5–7, 7–1, 2–7, 8–6, 1–7	(silver) Runner-up
2002	Korea Open	(China) Huang Sui	(China) Chen Lin (China) Jiang Xuelian	7–2, 7–3, 5–7, 7–3	(gold) Winner
2002	All England Open	(China) Huang Sui	(China) Zhang Jiewen (China) Wei Yili	7–3, 7–5, 8–7	(gold) Winner
2001	Malaysia Open	(China) Huang Sui	(China) Huang Nanyan (China) Yang Wei	1–7, 7–4, 3–7, 0–7	(silver) Runner-up
2001	Japan Open	(China) Huang Sui	(China) Huang Nanyan (China) Yang Wei	15–13, 15–10	(gold) Winner
2001	All England Open	(China) Huang Sui	(China) Wei Yili (China) Zhang Jiewen	10–15, 15–8, 15–9	(gold) Winner
2000	Swiss Open	(China) Qin Yiyuan	(China) Huang Nanyan (China) Yang Wei	15–5, 8–15, 15–9	(gold) Winner
1999	China Open	(China) Qin Yiyuan	(China) Ge Fei (China) Gu Jun	5–15, 6–15	(silver) Runner-up
1999	Denmark Open	(China) Qin Yiyuan	(China) Chen Lin (China) Jiang Xuelian	15–12, 15–8	(gold) Winner
1999	German Open	(China) Qin Yiyuan	(China) Chen Lin (China) Jiang Xuelian	13–15, 13–15	(silver) Runner-up
1999	Thailand Open	(China) Qin Yiyuan	(Indonesia) Emma Ermawati (Indonesia) Vita Marissa	15–8, 15–2	(gold) Winner
1999	Malaysia Open	(China) Qin Yiyuan	(China) Ge Fei (China) Gu Jun	8–15, 10–15	(silver) Runner-up

Mixed doubles
Year	Tournament	Partner	Opponent	Score	Result
2007	German Open	(China) Zheng Bo	(China) Xu Chen (China) Zhao Tingting	21–11, 21–10	(gold) Winner
2006	Macau Open	(China) Zhang Jun	(Denmark) Thomas Laybourn (Denmark) Kamilla Rytter Juhl	19–21, 20–22	(silver) Runner-up
2006	Malaysia Open	(China) Zhang Jun	(Denmark) Jonas Rasmussen (Denmark) Britta Andersen	19–21, 21–14, 21–15	(gold) Winner
2006	China Masters	(China) Zhang Jun	(China) Xie Zhongbo (China) Zhang Yawen	16–21, 21–10, 20–22	(silver) Runner-up
2006	All England Open	(China) Zhang Jun	(England) Nathan Robertson (England) Gail Emms	12–15, 17–15, 15–1	(gold) Winner
2006	German Open	(China) Zhang Jun	(China) Xie Zhongbo (China) Zhang Yawen	15–11, 15–12	(gold) Winner
2005	China Masters	(China) Zhang Jun	(Singapore) Hendri Kurniawan Saputra (Singapore) Li Yujia	15–7, 15–13	(gold) Winner
2005	Singapore Open	(China) Zhang Jun	(Thailand) Sudket Prapakamol (Thailand) Saralee Thungthongkam	10–15, 15–7, 15–5	(gold) Winner
2004	Indonesia Open	(China) Zhang Jun	(England) Robert Blair (England) Natalie Munt	15–9, 15–9	(gold) Winner
2004	Malaysia Open	(China) Zhang Jun	(South Korea) Kim Yong-hyun (South Korea) Lee Hyo-jung	15–2, 15–11	(gold) Winner
2004	Swiss Open	(China) Zhang Jun	(South Korea) Kim Dong-moon (South Korea) Ra Kyung-min	2–15, 8–15	(silver) Runner-up
2003	China Open	(China) Zhang Jun	(China) Chen Qiqiu (China) Zhao Tingting	15–13, 15–6	(gold) Winner
2003	Hong Kong Open	(China) Zhang Jun	(South Korea) Kim Dong-moon (South Korea) Ra Kyung-min	7–15, 10–15	(silver) Runner-up
2003	German Open	(China) Zhang Jun	(South Korea) Kim Dong-moon (South Korea) Ra Kyung-min	12–15, 15–11, 8–15	(silver) Runner-up
2003	Indonesia Open	(China) Zhang Jun	(South Korea) Kim Dong-moon (South Korea) Ra Kyung-min	15–10, 11–15, 6–15	(silver) Runner-up
2003	Japan Open	(China) Zhang Jun	(Denmark) Jens Eriksen (Denmark) Mette Schjoldager	9–11, 11–8, 11–9	(gold) Winner
2003	All England Open	(China) Zhang Jun	(China) Chen Qiqiu (China) Zhao Tingting	11–6, 11–7	(gold) Winner
2002	China Open	(China) Zhang Jun	(China) Chen Qiqiu (China) Zhao Tingting	11–4, 11–4	(gold) Winner
2001	All England Open	(China) Zhang Jun	(Denmark) Michael Søgaard (Denmark) Rikke Olsen	10–15, 15–8, 15–9	(gold) Winner
2001	Korea Open	(China) Zhang Jun	(South Korea) Kim Dong-moon (South Korea) Ra Kyung-min	8–15, 11–15	(silver) Runner-up
2000	Thailand Open	(China) Zhang Jun	(England) Simon Archer (England) Joanne Goode	15–13, 15–12	(gold) Winner
2000	Swiss Open	(China) Zhang Jun	(South Korea) Kim Dong-moon (South Korea) Ra Kyung-min	8–15, 9–15	(silver) Runner-up
1999	China Open	(China) Zhang Jun	(China) Liu Yong (China) Ge Fei	8–15, 5–15	(silver) Runner-up
1999	Denmark Open	(China) Zhang Jun	(China) Liu Yong (China) Ge Fei	12–15, 14–17	(silver) Runner-up

BWF Grand Prix Gold tournament
BWF Grand Prix tournament

=== IBF International (1 title) ===
Women's doubles
Year	Tournament	Partner	Opponent	Score	Result
1999	French International	(China) Qin Yiyuan	(Malaysia) Ang Li Peng (Malaysia) Chor Hooi Yee	15–0, 15–3	(gold) Winner

== Performance timeline ==
Key

W	Won	F	Finalist	SF	Semi-finalist
QF	Quarter-finalist	#R	Rounds 4, 3, 2, 1	RR	Round-robin stage
Q#	Qualification round	A	Absent	w/d	Withdrew
G	Gold	S	Silver	B	Bronze
NH	Not held	N/A	Not applicable	DNQ	Did not qualify

=== National team ===
- Junior level

Team events	1997
Asian Junior Championships	G

- Senior level

Team events	2000	2001	2002	2003	2004	2005	2006	2007	2008
Uber Cup	G	NH	G	NH	G	NH	G	NH	G
Sudirman Cup	NH	G	NH	S	NH	G	NH	G	NH
Asian Games	NH		G	NH			G	NH	

=== Individual competitions ===
==== Junior level ====
- Girls' doubles

Events	1996	1997
World Junior Championships	G	NH
Asian Junior Championships	NH	G

- Mixed doubles

Events	1996	1997
World Junior Championships	S	NH
Asia Junior Championships	NH	G

==== Senior level ====
- Women's singles

Tournaments	1995	1996
China Open	1R	1R

- Women's doubles

Tournaments	1999	2000	2001	2002	2003	2004	2005	2006	2007
Asian Championships	A		G	S	A				
Asian Games	NH			S	NH			G	NH
World Cup	NH						A	G	NH
World Championships	B	NH	G	NH	G	NH	S	G	S
Olympic Games	NH	B	NH			S	NH		

Tournament	IBF Grand Prix												BWF Superseries / Grand Prix		
Tournament	1995	1996	1997	1998	1999	2000	2001	2002	2003	2004	2005	2006	2007	2008	2009
Year-end Final	A				w/d		NH							A	
All England Open	A				SF	SF	W	W	W	W	W	W	SF	QF	A
China Masters	NH										F	W	QF	A	SF
China Open	Q1	2R	SF	NH	F	NH	SF	W	W	SF	F	A	W	A	
Chinese Taipei Open	A			NH	SF	A	NH	A				F	A		SF
German Open	A			NH	F	A					W	F	A	SF	A
Hong Kong Open	A					NH	A	NH	W	NH	F	F	SF	A	
Indonesia Open	A							W	W	A			SF	A	
Japan Open	A						W	F	W	w/d	SF	W	SF	A	
Korea Open	A			NH	SF	A	QF	W	A	SF	A		W	F	SF
Macau Open	NH							N/A	NH			W	W	A	SF
Malaysia Open	A				F	QF	F	A	F	F	F	W	W	F	QF
Singapore Open	A	NH	A			NH	A	2R	F	SF	F	A	SF	A	
Swiss Open	A					W	A			W	A			QF	A
Thailand Open	A			NH	W	SF	A	NH	A				W	A	F
Denmark Open	A				W	A									
Malaysia Masters	NH														SF
Philippines Open	NH											A		NH	W
US Open	A														w/d

- Mixed doubles

Tournaments	1999	2000	2001	2002	2003	2004	2005	2006	2007	2008
Asian Championships	A			G	A					1R
Asian Games	NH			QF	NH			G	NH	
World Cup	NH						A	B	NH	
World Championships	2R	NH	G	NH	S	NH	QF	QF	S	NH
Olympic Games	NH	G	NH			G	NH			1R

Tournament	IBF Grand Prix												BWF Superseries / Grand Prix	
Tournament	1995	1996	1997	1998	1999	2000	2001	2002	2003	2004	2005	2006	2007	2008
Year-end Final	A					SF	NH							A
All England Open	A				1R	QF	W	SF	W	2R	QF	W	W	W
China Masters	NH										W	F	W	A
China Open	1R	1R	1R	NH	F	NH	SF	W	W	QF	2R	SF	QF	A
German Open	A			NH	A				F	A	SF	W	W	A
Hong Kong Open	A					NH	A	NH	F	NH	SF	SF	F	A
Indonesia Open	A							SF	F	W	A		W	W
Japan Open	A					SF	SF	QF	W	w/d	QF	QF	W	A
Korea Open	A			NH	1R	A	F	2R	A				W	A
Malaysia Open	A				SF	SF	A		SF	W	2R	W	W	A
Singapore Open	A	NH	A			NH	A	1R	QF	QF	W	A	QF	QF
Swiss Open	A					F	A			F	A			QF
Thailand Open	A			NH	SF	W	A	NH	A			QF	A	
Chinese Taipei Open	A			NH	1R	A	NH	A				QF	A	
Denmark Open	A				F	A			QF	A				
French Open	A	N/A										NH	SF	A
Macau Open	NH							N/A	NH			F	A	
