= 2003 Indonesia Open (badminton) =

Tournament details
- Dates: 26 August 2003 – 31 August 2003
- Edition: 22nd
- Level: World Grand Prix 5 Stars
- Total prize money: US$170,000
- Venue: GOR Batam
- Location: Batam, Indonesia

Champions
- Men's singles: (Indonesia) Taufik Hidayat
- Women's singles: (China) Xie Xingfang
- Men's doubles: (China) Sang Yang (China) Zheng Bo
- Women's doubles: (China) Gao Ling (China) Huang Sui
- Mixed doubles: (South Korea) Kim Dong-moon (South Korea) Ra Kyung-min

The 2003 Indonesia Open (officially known as the Sanyo Indonesia Open 2003 for sponsorship reasons) was a five-star World Grand Prix badminton tournament that was held in Batam, from August 26 to August 31, 2003. It was the 22nd edition of the Indonesia Open.

== Final results ==
| Category | Winners | Runners-up | Score |
|---|---|---|---|
| Men's singles | (Indonesia) Taufik Hidayat | (China) Chen Hong | 15–9, 15–9 |
| Women's singles | (China) Xie Xingfang | (Hong Kong) Wang Chen | 11–6, 8–11, 11–1 |
| Men's doubles | (China) Sang Yang & Zheng Bo | (Thailand) Pramote Teerawiwatana & Tesana Panvisvas | 16–17, 17–15, 15–5 |
| Women's doubles | (China) Gao Ling & Huang Sui | (China) Yang Wei & Zhang Jiewen | walkover |
| Mixed doubles | (South Korea) Kim Dong-moon & Ra Kyung-min | (China) Zhang Jun & Gao Ling | 10–15, 15–11, 15–6 |

| Preceded by 2002 Indonesia Open | Indonesia Open | Succeeded by 2004 Indonesia Open |
