= 2002 Asian Badminton Championships =

Badminton championships

Tournament details
- Country: Thailand
- City: Bangkok
- Venue: Nimibutr Stadium
- Dates: November 13–17, 2002

The 2002 Asian Badminton Championships was the 21st edition of the Asian Badminton Championships. It was held in Nimibutr Stadium, Bangkok, Thailand from 13 to 17 November 2002.

== Medalists ==
Disziplin	Gold	Silver	Bronze
Men's singles	(Indonesia) Sony Dwi Kuncoro	(Indonesia) Taufik Hidayat	(China) Chen Hong
Men's singles	(Indonesia) Sony Dwi Kuncoro	(Indonesia) Taufik Hidayat	(China) Xia Xuanze
Women's singles	(China) Zhou Mi	(China) Zhang Ning	(Singapore) Xiao Luxi
Women's singles	(China) Zhou Mi	(China) Zhang Ning	(Hong Kong) Wang Chen
Men's doubles	(South Korea) Ha Tae-kwon (South Korea) Kim Dong-moon	(Indonesia) Candra Wijaya (Indonesia) Sigit Budiarto	(Thailand) Pramote Teerawiwatana (Thailand) Tesana Panvisvas
Men's doubles	(South Korea) Ha Tae-kwon (South Korea) Kim Dong-moon	(Indonesia) Candra Wijaya (Indonesia) Sigit Budiarto	(Indonesia) Tri Kusharjanto (Indonesia) Halim Haryanto
Women's doubles	(China) Zhang Jiewen (China) Yang Wei	(China) Gao Ling (China) Huang Sui	(Thailand) Saralee Thungthongkam (Thailand) Sathinee Chankrachangwong
Women's doubles	(China) Zhang Jiewen (China) Yang Wei	(China) Gao Ling (China) Huang Sui	(China) Wei Yili (China) Zhao Tingting
Mixed	(China) Zhang Jun (China) Gao Ling	(Thailand) Khunakorn Sudhisodhi (Thailand) Saralee Thungthongkam	(China) Wang Wei (China) Zhao Tingting
Mixed	(China) Zhang Jun (China) Gao Ling	(Thailand) Khunakorn Sudhisodhi (Thailand) Saralee Thungthongkam	(Indonesia) Tri Kusharjanto (Indonesia) Emma Ermawati

== Medal table ==
Rank	Nation	Gold	Silver	Bronze	Total
1	China (CHN)	3	2	4	9
2	Indonesia (INA)	1	2	2	5
3	South Korea (KOR)	1	0	0	1
4	Thailand (THA)	0	1	2	3
5	Hong Kong (HKG)	0	0	1	1
5	Singapore (SGP)	0	0	1	1
Totals (6 entries)		5	5	10	20

=== Finals ===
Category	Winners	Runners-up	Score
Men's singles	(Indonesia) Sony Dwi Kuncoro	(Indonesia) Taufik Hidayat	15–12, 15–5
Women's singles	(China) Zhou Mi	(China) Zhang Ning	6–11, 11–3, 11–8
Men's doubles	(South Korea) Ha Tae-kwon & Kim Dong-moon	(Indonesia) Candra Wijaya & Sigit Budiarto	15–6, 15–8
Women's doubles	(China) Zhang Jiewen & Yang Wei	(China) Gao Ling & Huang Sui	11–8, 11–6
Mixed doubles	(China) Zhang Jun & Gao Ling	(Thailand) Khunakorn Sudhisodhi & Saralee Thungthongkam	11–7, 11–8

=== Semi-finals ===
Category	Winner	Runner-up	Score
Men's singles	(Indonesia) Sony Dwi Kuncoro	(China) Chen Hong	15–5, 15–11
Men's singles	(Indonesia) Taufik Hidayat	(China) Xia Xuanze	15–2, 15–11
Women's singles	(China) Zhou Mi	(Singapore) Xiao Luxi	11–0, 11–1
Women's singles	(China) Zhang Ning	(Hong Kong) Wang Chen	11–2, 11–4
Men's doubles	(South Korea) Ha Tae-kwon (South Korea) Kim Dong-moon	(Indonesia) Halim Haryanto (Indonesia) Tri Kusharjanto	15–6, 15–12
Men's doubles	(Indonesia) Candra Wijaya (Indonesia) Sigit Budiarto	(Thailand) Pramote Teerawiwatana (Thailand) Tesana Panvisvas	17–16, 15–7
Women's doubles	(China) Gao Ling (China) Huang Sui	(China) Wei Yili (China) Zhao Tingting	11–1, 11–1
Women's doubles	(China) Yang Wei (China) Zhang Jiewen	(Thailand) Saralee Thungthongkam (Thailand) Sathinee Chankrachangwong	11–6, 11–2
Mixed doubles	(Thailand) Khunakorn Sudhisodhi (Thailand) Saralee Thungthongkam	(Indonesia) Tri Kusharjanto (Indonesia) Emma Ermawati	11–7, 11–2
Mixed doubles	(China) Zhang Jun (China) Gao Ling	(China) Wang Wei (China) Zhao Tingting	11–4, 11–3
