= 2003 IBF World Championships =

Tournament details
- Dates: 28 July – 3 August
- Edition: 13th
- Level: International
- Venue: National Indoor Arena
- Location: Birmingham, United Kingdom

The 2003 IBF World Championships (World Badminton Championships) were held in the National Indoor Arena, Birmingham, United Kingdom, between 28 July and 3 August 2003. The championships had originally been planned to take place from 12 May-18 May, but were rescheduled following the international outbreak of SARS.

This edition also rewarded the points for the players to collected for the qualification to 2004 Summer Olympics in Athens, Greece.

== Host city selection ==
International Badminton Federation decided to split the IBF World Championships and the Sudirman Cup as separate tournaments starting from 2003. Canada, China, England, Hong Kong, and the Netherlands were the countries interested in hosting the tournaments. England later announced as host for the first standalone world championships.

== Medalists ==
=== Medal table ===
* Host nation (England)

| Rank | Nation | Gold | Silver | Bronze | Total |
|---|---|---|---|---|---|
| 1 | China | 3 | 3 | 5 | 11 |
| 2 | Denmark | 1 | 0 | 2 | 3 |
| 3 | South Korea | 1 | 0 | 1 | 2 |
| 4 | Indonesia | 0 | 1 | 0 | 1 |
| 4 | Malaysia | 0 | 1 | 0 | 1 |
| 6 | Japan | 0 | 0 | 1 | 1 |
| 6 | Netherlands | 0 | 0 | 1 | 1 |
| Totals (7 entries) | | 5 | 5 | 10 | 20 |

=== Events ===
| Event | Gold | Silver | Bronze |
|---|---|---|---|
| Men's singles | (China) Xia Xuanze | (Malaysia) Wong Choong Hann | (South Korea) Shon Seung-mo |
| Men's singles | (China) Xia Xuanze | (Malaysia) Wong Choong Hann | (China) Bao Chunlai |
| Women's singles | (China) Zhang Ning | (China) Gong Ruina | (China) Zhou Mi |
| Women's singles | (China) Zhang Ning | (China) Gong Ruina | (Netherlands) Mia Audina |
| Men's doubles | (Denmark) Lars Paaske (Denmark) Jonas Rasmussen | (Indonesia) Candra Wijaya (Indonesia) Sigit Budiarto | (China) Sang Yang (China) Zheng Bo |
| Men's doubles | (Denmark) Lars Paaske (Denmark) Jonas Rasmussen | (Indonesia) Candra Wijaya (Indonesia) Sigit Budiarto | (China) Fu Haifeng (China) Cai Yun |
| Women's doubles | (China) Gao Ling (China) Huang Sui | (China) Wei Yili (China) Zhao Tingting | (Japan) Shizuka Yamamoto (Japan) Seiko Yamada |
| Women's doubles | (China) Gao Ling (China) Huang Sui | (China) Wei Yili (China) Zhao Tingting | (Denmark) Rikke Olsen (Denmark) Ann-Lou Jørgensen |
| Mixed doubles | (South Korea) Kim Dong-moon (South Korea) Ra Kyung-min | (China) Zhang Jun (China) Gao Ling | (Denmark) Jonas Rasmussen (Denmark) Rikke Olsen |
| Mixed doubles | (South Korea) Kim Dong-moon (South Korea) Ra Kyung-min | (China) Zhang Jun (China) Gao Ling | (China) Chen Qiqiu (China) Zhao Tingting |
