= Badminton at the 2010 Commonwealth Games – Men's doubles =

The Men's doubles event of badminton at the 2010 Commonwealth Games was held from 10 to 14 October 2010 in Siri Fort Sports Complex, New Delhi, India.

== Finals ==
Quarterfinals
1 | Koo Kien Keat (MAS); Tan Boon Heong (MAS) | 21 | 21
Oliver Leydon (NZL); Henry Tam (NZL) | 16 | 13
4 | Hendri Saputra (SIN); Hendra Wijaya (SIN) | 21 | 22
Watson Briggs (SCO); Paul van Rietvelde (SCO) | 11 | 20
Chayut Triyachart (SIN); Derek Wong Zi Liang (SIN) | 21 | 21
3 | Rupesh Kumar (IND); Sanave Thomas (IND) | 16 | 15
Chan Peng Soon (MAS); Muhammad Hafiz Hashim (MAS) | 8 | 7
2 | Anthony Clark (ENG); Nathan Robertson (ENG) | 21 | 21

Semifinals
1 | Koo Kien Keat (MAS); Tan Boon Heong (MAS) | 21 | 21
4 | Hendri Saputra (SIN); Hendra Wijaya (SIN) | 11 | 8
Chayut Triyachart (SIN); Derek Wong Zi Liang (SIN) | 10 | 21 | 14
2 | Anthony Clark (ENG); Nathan Robertson (ENG) | 21 | 17 | 21

Gold Medal Match
1 | Koo Kien Keat (MAS); Tan Boon Heong (MAS) | 21 | 21
2 | Anthony Clark (ENG); Nathan Robertson (ENG) | 19 | 14
Bronze Medal Match
4 | Hendri Saputra (SIN); Hendra Wijaya (SIN) | 23 | 21
Chayut Triyachart (SIN); Derek Wong Zi Liang (SIN) | 21 | 12
