= Badminton at the 2002 Asian Games – Women's team =

Badminton championships

Women's team at the 2002 Asian Games
- Venue: Gangseo Gymnasium
- Dates: 6–8 October
- Competitors: 42 from 6 nations

Medalists
gold medal	China; Dai Yun, Gao Ling, Gong Ruina, Huang Nanyan, Huang Sui, Wei Yili, Yang Wei, Zhang Jiewen, Zhang Ning, Zhou Mi
silver medal	South Korea; Bae Seung-hee, Hwang Yu-mi, Jun Jae-youn, Kim Kyeung-ran, Kwon Hee-sook, Lee Hae-young, Lee Hyo-jung, Lee Kyung-won, Ra Kyung-min, Shin Ja-young
bronze medal	Hong Kong; Koon Wai Chee, Li Wing Mui, Ling Wan Ting, Siu Ching Man, Wang Chen
bronze medal	Thailand; Sathinee Chankrachangwong, Sujitra Ekmongkolpaisarn, Salakjit Ponsana, Saralee Thungthongkam

The badminton women's team tournament at the 2002 Asian Games in Busan took place from 6 November to 8 November at Gangseo Gymnasium.

== Schedule ==
All times are Korea Standard Time (UTC+09:00)

Date	Time	Event
Sunday, 6 October 2002	14:00	Quarterfinals
Monday, 7 October 2002	14:00	Semifinals
Tuesday, 8 October 2002	16:00	Final

== Results ==
Quarterfinals		Semifinals			Final
		1	China	3
Hong Kong	3		Hong Kong	0
Japan	2				1	China	3
Malaysia	2				2	South Korea	1
Thailand	3		Thailand	0
		2	South Korea	3

=== Quarterfinals ===
6 October	Hong Kong	3–2	Japan

Wang Chen	1–2	Kanako Yonekura	11–3, 7–11, 9–11
Ling Wan Ting	2–1	Kaori Mori	9–11, 11–6, 11–4
Koon Wai Chee	2–1	Shizuka Yamamoto	11–9, 3–11, 13–12
Li Wing Mui / Ling Wan Ting	0–2	Shizuka Yamamoto / Seiko Yamada	5–11, 4–11
Wang Chen / Koon Wai Chee	2–0	Yoshiko Iwata / Miyuki Tai	11–2, 11–9

6 October	Malaysia	2–3	Thailand

Wong Mew Choo	0–2	Sujitra Ekmongkolpaisarn	5–11, 3–11
Ng Mee Fen	2–1	Salakjit Ponsana	0–11, 11–5, 11–8
Wong Miew Kheng	2–0	Sathinee Chankrachangwong	11–2, 11–6
Lim Pek Siah / Ang Li Peng	0–2	Saralee Thungthongkam / Sujitra Ekmongkolpaisarn	4–11, 8–11
Chin Eei Hui / Wong Pei Tty	1–2	Sathinee Chankrachangwong / Salakjit Ponsana	11–7, 4–11, 7–11

=== Semifinals ===
7 October	China	3–0	Hong Kong

Zhou Mi	2–0	Wang Chen	11–1, 11–2
Gong Ruina	2–0	Ling Wan Ting	11–0, 11–0
Wei Yili / Zhang Jiewen	2–1	Wang Chen / Koon Wai Chee	11–4, 10–13, 11–1

7 October	Thailand	0–3	South Korea

Sujitra Ekmongkolpaisarn	0–2	Kim Kyeung-ran	6–11, 3–11
Salakjit Ponsana	0–2	Jun Jae-youn	2–11, 3–11
Saralee Thungthongkam / Sujitra Ekmongkolpaisarn	1–2	Ra Kyung-min / Lee Kyung-won	1–11, 13–10, 6–11

=== Final ===
8 October	China	3–1	South Korea

Zhou Mi	2–0	Kim Kyeung-ran	11–9, 11–8
Gong Ruina	2–0	Jun Jae-youn	11–7, 11–7
Yang Wei / Huang Nanyan	1–2	Ra Kyung-min / Lee Kyung-won	11–5, 4–11, 9–11
Gao Ling / Huang Sui	2–1	Lee Hyo-jung / Hwang Yu-mi	9–11, 11–2, 11–8

== Non-participating athletes ==
- Dai Yun (CHN)
- Zhang Ning (CHN)
- Siu Ching Man (HKG)
- Bae Seung-hee (KOR)
- Kwon Hee-sook (KOR)
- Lee Hae-young (KOR)
- Shin Ja-young (KOR)
