= Badminton at the 2002 Asian Games – Women's doubles =

Women's doubles at the 2002 Asian Games
- Venue: Gangseo Gymnasium
- Dates: 11–14 October
- Competitors: 26 from 8 nations

Medalists
gold medal	Ra Kyung-min; Lee Kyung-won	South Korea
silver medal	Gao Ling; Huang Sui	China
bronze medal	Yang Wei; Huang Nanyan	China
bronze medal	Lee Hyo-jung; Hwang Yu-mi	South Korea

The badminton women's doubles tournament at the 2002 Asian Games in Busan took place from 11 November to 14 November at Gangseo Gymnasium.

13 teams from 8 nations entered for the tournament and the Korean duo of Ra Kyung-min and Lee Kyung-won won the gold in this tournament. with a two-set victory over China's Gao Ling and Huang Sui. Two other teams from China and South Korea shared the bronze medal.

== Schedule ==
All times are Korea Standard Time (UTC+09:00)

Date	Time	Event
Friday, 11 October 2002	18:00	Preliminaries 1st
Saturday, 12 October 2002	17:30	Quarterfinals
Sunday, 13 October 2002	18:00	Semifinals
Monday, 14 October 2002	14:10	Final

== Results ==
Preliminaries 1st
Shizuka Yamamoto (JPN); Seiko Yamada (JPN)	11	11
Wong Pei Tty (MAS); Chin Eei Hui (MAS)	7	6
Li Wing Mui (HKG); Koon Wai Chee (HKG)	9	2
Saralee Thungthongkam (THA); Sathinee Chankrachangwong (THA)	11	11
Yoshiko Iwata (JPN); Miyuki Tai (JPN)	4	8
Lee Hyo-jung (KOR); Hwang Yu-mi (KOR)	11	11
Siu Ching Man (HKG); Ling Wan Ting (HKG)	2	1
4	Emma Ermawati (INA); Vita Marissa (INA)	11	11
Ang Li Peng (MAS); Lim Pek Siah (MAS)	2	9
Cheng Wen-hsing (TPE); Chien Yu-chin (TPE)	11	11

Quarterfinals
1	Yang Wei (CHN); Huang Nanyan (CHN)	11	11
Shizuka Yamamoto (JPN); Seiko Yamada (JPN)	5	8
3	Ra Kyung-min (KOR); Lee Kyung-won (KOR)	11	11
Saralee Thungthongkam (THA); Sathinee Chankrachangwong (THA)	7	3
Lee Hyo-jung (KOR); Hwang Yu-mi (KOR)	11	4	11
4	Emma Ermawati (INA); Vita Marissa (INA)	3	11	6
Cheng Wen-hsing (TPE); Chien Yu-chin (TPE)	5	6
2	Gao Ling (CHN); Huang Sui (CHN)	11	11

Semifinals
1	Yang Wei (CHN); Huang Nanyan (CHN)	7	9
3	Ra Kyung-min (KOR); Lee Kyung-won (KOR)	11	11
Lee Hyo-jung (KOR); Hwang Yu-mi (KOR)	2	9
2	Gao Ling (CHN); Huang Sui (CHN)	11	11

Final
3	Ra Kyung-min (KOR); Lee Kyung-won (KOR)	11	11
2	Gao Ling (CHN); Huang Sui (CHN)	8	7
