= 2002 Singapore Open (badminton) =

Tournament details
- Dates: 19 August 2002– 25 August 2002
- Edition: 53rd
- Level: World Grand Prix 5 Stars
- Total prize money: US$170,000
- Venue: Singapore Indoor Stadium
- Location: Kallang, Singapore

Champions
- Men's singles: (China) Chen Hong
- Women's singles: (China) Zhou Mi
- Men's doubles: (England) Eng Hian (England) Flandy Limpele
- Women's doubles: (China) Huang Nanyan (China) Yang Wei
- Mixed doubles: (South Korea) Kim Dong-moon (South Korea) Ra Kyung-min

The 2002 Singapore Open (officially known as the Yonex-Sunrise Singapore Open 2002 for sponsorship reasons) was a five-star badminton tournament that took place at the Singapore Indoor Stadium in Singapore, from August 19 to August 25, 2002. The total prize money on offer was US$170,000.

== Prize money distributions ==
Below is the prize money distributions for each round (all in USD). In doubles it is referred as the prize money per pair:

Category	Winner	Runner-up	Semi finalist	Quarter finalist	Last 8
Men's Singles	13,600	6,800	3,400	1,700	680
Women's Singles	11,730	5,610	3,060	1,530	
Men's Doubles	12,240	6,800	4,080	2,380	
Women's Doubles	10,370	6,800	3,740	1,870	
Mixed Doubles	10,370	6,800	3,740	1,870	

== Final results ==
Category	Winners	Runners-up	Score
Men's singles	(China) Chen Hong	(Singapore) Ronald Susilo	15–4, 15–1
Women's singles	(China) Zhou Mi	(China) Zhang Ning	11–6, 11–3
Men's doubles	(England) Eng Hian & Flandy Limpele	(South Korea) Ha Tae-kwon & Kim Dong-moon	15–8, 11–15, 17–14
Women's doubles	(China) Huang Nanyan & Yang Wei	(South Korea) Hwang Yu-mi & Lee Hyo-jung	11–1, 11–8
Mixed doubles	(South Korea) Kim Dong-moon & Ra Kyung-min	(England) Nathan Robertson & Gail Emms	11–2, 13–10
