= Hendra Wijaya (badminton) =

Singaporean badminton player (born 1985)

Personal information
- Born: 27 December 1985 (age 40)
- Height: 1.65 m (5 ft 5 in)
- Weight: 63 kg (139 lb)

Sport
- Country: Singapore
- Sport: Badminton
- Handedness: Left

Men's & mixed doubles
- Highest ranking: 20 (MD 11 March 2010 with Hendri Saputra); 108 (XD 23 Sep 2010)
- BWF profile
Medal record
Men's badminton
Representing Singapore
Commonwealth Games
Bronze medal – third place	2010 Delhi	Men's doubles
SEA Games
Silver medal – second place	2007 Nakhon Ratchasima	Men's doubles
Silver medal – second place	2007 Nakhon Ratchasima	Men's team
Bronze medal – third place	2009 Vientiane	Men's team
Bronze medal – third place	2015 Singapore	Men's team
Bronze medal – third place	2017 Kuala Lumpur	Men's team
World Junior Championships
Bronze medal – third place	2002 Pretoria	Boys' singles
Asian Junior Championships
Silver medal – second place	2002 Kuala Lumpur	Boys' singles

Hendra Wijaya (born 27 December 1985) is a Singaporean retired badminton player. Wijaya and his brother, Hendri Saputra, joined the Singapore Badminton Association (SBA) in 2000 and both became Singapore citizens after five years.

== Achievements ==
=== Commonwealth Games ===
Men's doubles
Year	Venue	Partner	Opponent	Score	Result
2010	Siri Fort Sports Complex; New Delhi, India	(Singapore) Hendri Kurniawan Saputra	(Singapore) Chayut Triyachart (Singapore) Derek Wong	23–21, 21–12	Bronze

=== SEA Games ===
Men's doubles
Year	Venue	Partner	Opponent	Score	Result
2007	Wongchawalitkul University; Nakhon Ratchasima, Thailand	(Singapore) Hendri Kurniawan Saputra	(Indonesia) Markis Kido (Indonesia) Hendra Setiawan	17–21, 12–21	Silver

=== World Junior Championships ===
Boys' singles
Year	Venue	Opponent	Score	Result
2002	Pretoria Showgrounds, Pretoria, South Africa	(China) Chen Jin	3–15, 15–12, 6–15	Bronze

=== Asian Junior Championships ===
Boys' singles
Year	Venue	Opponent	Score	Result
2002	Kuala Lumpur Badminton Stadium, Kuala Lumpur, Malaysia	(South Korea) Park Sung-hwan	11–15, 5–15	Silver

=== BWF Grand Prix ===
The BWF Grand Prix had two levels, the BWF Grand Prix and Grand Prix Gold. It was a series of badminton tournaments sanctioned by the Badminton World Federation (BWF) which was held from 2007 to 2017. The World Badminton Grand Prix has been sanctioned by the International Badminton Federation from 1983 to 2006.

Men's doubles
Year	Tournament	Partner	Opponent	Score	Result
2006	New Zealand Open	(Singapore) Hendri Kurniawan Saputra	(Indonesia) Eng Hian (Indonesia) Rian Sukmawan	13–21, 9–11 retired	(silver) Runner-up
2009	India Open	(Singapore) Hendri Kurniawan Saputra	(Malaysia) Choong Tan Fook (Malaysia) Lee Wan Wah	9–21, 11–21	(silver) Runner-up

Mixed doubles
Year	Tournament	Partner	Opponent	Score	Result
2006	New Zealand Open	(Singapore) Frances Liu	(Singapore) Hendri Kurniawan Saputra (Singapore) Li Yujia	11–21, 12–21	(silver) Runner-up

BWF Grand Prix Gold tournament
BWF Grand Prix tournament

=== BWF International Challenge/Series ===
Men's singles
Year	Tournament	Opponent	Score	Result
2002	Smiling Fish Satellite	(Malaysia) Allan Tai	4–7, 7–8, 5–7	(silver) Runner-up
2003	Croatian International	(Japan) Sho Sasaki	12–15, 17–14, 15–10	(gold) Winner

Men's doubles
Year	Tournament	Partner	Opponent	Score	Result
2005	Iran Fajr International	(Singapore) Erwin Djohan	(Iran) Arash Abdul Mohamadian (Iran) Nikzad Shiri	15–7, 15–8	(gold) Winner
2011	New Zealand International	(Singapore) Danny Bawa Chrisnanta	(Chinese Taipei) Huang Po-yi (Chinese Taipei) Lu Chia-pin	21–15, 21–17	(gold) Winner
2015	Vietnam International	(Singapore) Terry Hee	(Chinese Taipei) Lu Ching-yao (Chinese Taipei) Tien Tzu-chieh	13–21, 21–14, 21–23	(silver) Runner-up
2016	Smiling Fish International	(Singapore) Danny Bawa Chrisnanta	(Malaysia) Nur Mohd Azriyn Ayub (Malaysia) Jagdish Singh	11–7, 14–15, 7–11, 11–9, 11–8	(gold) Winner
2016	Singapore International	(Singapore) Danny Bawa Chrisnanta	(Malaysia) Goh Sze Fei (Malaysia) Nur Izzuddin	13–21, 14–21	(silver) Runner-up
2016	Hungarian International	(Singapore) Danny Bawa Chrisnanta	(Denmark) Frederik Colberg (Denmark) Rasmus Fladberg	11–7, 14–15, 7–11, 11–9, 11–8	(gold) Winner

Mixed doubles
Year	Tournament	Partner	Opponent	Score	Result
2005	Croatian International	(Singapore) Frances Liu	(Slovenia) Andrej Pohar (Slovenia) Maja Pohar	15–11, 13–15, 15–7	(gold) Winner

BWF International Challenge tournament
BWF International Series tournament
BWF Future Series tournament
