= Huang Nanyan =

Chinese badminton player (born 1977)

Huang Nanyan 黄楠雁
Personal information
- Born: 11 April 1977 (age 49) Nanning, Guangxi, China
- Height: 1.67 m (5 ft 6 in)
- Weight: 56 kg (123 lb)

Sport
- Country: China
- Sport: Badminton
- Handedness: Right

Women's doubles
- Highest ranking: 1 (with Yang Wei June 1999)
- BWF profile
Medal record
Women's badminton
Representing China
Olympic Games
Silver medal – second place	2000 Sydney	Women's doubles
Sudirman Cup
Gold medal – first place	1999 Copenhagen	Mixed team
Gold medal – first place	2001 Seville	Mixed team
Uber Cup
Gold medal – first place	2000 Kuala Lumpur	Women's team
Gold medal – first place	2002 Guangzhou	Women's team
Asian Games
Gold medal – first place	2002 Busan	Women's team
Bronze medal – third place	2002 Busan	Women's doubles
Asian Championships
Gold medal – first place	1997 Kuala Lumpur	Women's doubles

Huang Nanyan (Chinese: 黄楠雁; pinyin: Huáng Nányàn, born April 11, 1977, in Guangxi) is a badminton player from the People's Republic of China.

== Career ==
A women's doubles specialist, Huang won a number of top tier titles in the late 1990s and early 2000s. The first of these came at the 1997 Asian Badminton Championships (now Badminton Asia Championships) with Liu Zhong. The rest came in partnership with Yang Wei and included the World Badminton Grand Prix (2000), and the Dutch (1998), Brunei (1998), South Korea (1999, 2001), Singapore (1999, 2002), and Malaysia (2000, 2001, 2002) Opens. Huang and Yang were silver medalists at the 2000 Olympic Games in Sydney, losing the final to their formidable fellow countrywomen Ge Fei and Gu Jun. Huang and Yang competed together in the 2002 Uber Cup series (women's world team championships) and clinched the deciding point for their country in the final "tie" against South Korea. Huang apparently retired after this victory while Yang went on to further success in partnership with Zhang Jiewen.

== Achievements ==
=== Olympic Games ===
Women's doubles
Year	Venue	Partner	Opponent	Score	Result
2000	The Dome, Sydney, Australia	(China) Yang Wei	(China) Ge Fei (China) Gu Jun	5–15, 5–15	Silver

=== Asian Games ===
Women's doubles
Year	Venue	Partner	Opponent	Score	Result
2002	Gangseo Gymnasium, Busan, South Korea	(China) Yang Wei	(South Korea) Lee Kyung-won (South Korea) Ra Kyung-min	7–11, 9–11	Bronze

=== Asian Championships ===
Women's doubles
Year	Venue	Partner	Opponent	Score	Result
1997	Stadium Negara, Kuala Lumpur, Malaysia	(China) Liu Zhong	(China) Liu Lu (China) Qian Hong	12–15, 17–14, 15–6	Gold

=== IBF World Grand Prix (11 titles, 10 runners-up) ===
The World Badminton Grand Prix was sanctioned by the International Badminton Federation from 1983 to 2006.

Women's doubles
Year	Tournament	Partner	Opponent	Score	Result
1998	Swedish Open	(China) Liu Zhong	(South Korea) Jang Hye-Ock (South Korea) Ra Kyung-Min	12–15, 9–15	(silver) Runner-up
1998	Brunei Open	(China) Yang Wei	(Denmark) Rikke Olsen (Denmark) Marlene Thomsen	15–11, 17–14	(gold) Winner
1998	Dutch Open	(China) Yang Wei	(Japan) Naomi Murakami (Japan) Hiromi Yamada	15–7, 15–4	(gold) Winner
1998	Denmark Open	(China) Yang Wei	(China) Qin Yiyuan (China) Tang Yongshu	17–15, 10–15, 11–15	(silver) Runner-up
1999	Korea Open	(China) Yang Wei	(China) Ge Fei (China) Zhang Ning	15–10, 15–1	(gold) Winner
1999	Chinese Taipei Open	(China) Yang Wei	(Denmark) Helene Kirkegaard (Denmark) Rikke Olsen	13–15, 4–15	(silver) Runner-up
1999	Japan Open	(China) Yang Wei	(China) Ge Fei (China) Gu Jun	15–12, 16–17, 5–15	(silver) Runner-up
1999	Singapore Open	(China) Yang Wei	(Indonesia) Carmelita (Indonesia) Indarti Issolina	15–3, 15–8	(gold) Winner
1999	U.S. Open	(China) Lu Ying	(Canada) Milaine Cloutier (Canada) Robbyn Hermitage	15–4, 15–9	(gold) Winner
2000	Korea Open	(China) Yang Wei	(South Korea) Chung Jae-hee (South Korea) Ra Kyung-min	6–15, 15–8, 5–15	(silver) Runner-up
2000	Swiss Open	(China) Yang Wei	(China) Gao Ling (China) Qin Yiyuan	5–15, 15–8, 9–15	(silver) Runner-up
2000	Japan Open	(China) Yang Wei	(China) Ge Fei (China) Gu Jun	13–15, 15–4, 15–11	(gold) Winner
2000	Thailand Open	(China) Yang Wei	(China) Ge Fei (China) Gu Jun	8–15, 11–15	(silver) Runner-up
2000	Malaysia Open	(China) Yang Wei	(China) Ge Fei (China) Gu Jun	17–15, 6–15, 8–15	(silver) Runner-up
2000	World Grand Prix Finals	(China) Yang Wei	(China) Chen Lin (China) Jiang Xuelian	8–6, 7–3, 3–7, 7–3	(gold) Winner
2001	Korea Open	(China) Yang Wei	(South Korea) Kim Kyeung-ran (South Korea) Ra Kyung-min	15–13, 15–10	(gold) Winner
2001	Japan Open	(China) Yang Wei	(China) Gao Ling (China) Huang Sui	13–15, 10–15	(silver) Runner-up
2001	Malaysia Open	(China) Yang Wei	(China) Gao Ling (China) Huang Sui	7–1, 4–7, 7–3, 7–0	(gold) Winner
2001	China Open	(China) Yang Wei	(China) Wei Yili (China) Zhang Jiewen	6–8, 3–7, 8–6, 7–8	(silver) Runner-up
2002	Malaysia Open	(China) Yang Wei	(China) Zhang Yawen (China) Zhao Tingting	11–5, 11–5	(gold) Winner
2002	Singapore Open	(China) Yang Wei	(South Korea) Hwang Yu-mi (South Korea) Lee Hyo-jung	11–1, 11–8	(gold) Winner
