= Wei Yili =

Chinese badminton player (born 1982)

Wei Yili 魏轶力
Personal information
- Born: 24 June 1982 (age 44) Yichang, Hubei, China
- Height: 1.75 m (5 ft 9 in)
- Weight: 68 kg (150 lb)

Sport
- Country: China
- Sport: Badminton
- Handedness: Left

Women's doubles
- Highest ranking: 1 (with Zhao Tingting May 2003); 1 (with Zhang Yawen August 2007)
- BWF profile
Medal record
Women's badminton
Representing China
Olympic Games
Bronze medal – third place	2008 Beijing	Women's doubles
World Championships
Silver medal – second place	2001 Seville	Women's doubles
Silver medal – second place	2003 Birmingham	Women's doubles
Silver medal – second place	2006 Madrid	Women's doubles
Bronze medal – third place	2007 Kuala Lumpur	Women's doubles
World Cup
Silver medal – second place	2005 Yiyang	Women's doubles
Sudirman Cup
Gold medal – first place	2007 Glasgow	Mixed team
Silver medal – second place	2003 Eindhoven	Mixed team
Uber Cup
Gold medal – first place	2002 Guangzhou	Women's team
Gold medal – first place	2004 Jakarta	Women's team
Gold medal – first place	2008 Jakarta	Women's team
Asian Games
Gold medal – first place	2002 Busan	Women's team
Asian Championships
Bronze medal – third place	2002 Bangkok	Women's doubles
World Junior Championships
Gold medal – first place	2000 Guangzhou	Mixed team
Gold medal – first place	2000 Guangzhou	Women's doubles
Silver medal – second place	2000 Guangzhou	Mixed doubles
Asian Junior Championships
Gold medal – first place	1999 Yangon	Girls' team
Gold medal – first place	2000 Kyoto	Girls' doubles
Gold medal – first place	2000 Kyoto	Mixed doubles
Gold medal – first place	2000 Kyoto	Girls' team
Silver medal – second place	1999 Yangon	Girls' doubles
Silver medal – second place	1999 Yangon	Mixed doubles

Wei Yili (simplified Chinese: 魏轶力; traditional Chinese: 魏軼力; pinyin: Wèi Yìlì; born 24 June 1982) is a former badminton player from China.

== Career ==
A women's doubles specialist, since 2001 Wei has competed on the world circuit in partnership with a variety of her fellow countrywomen, but most often with Zhang Jiewen, Zhao Tingting or Zhang Yawen. A member of China's perennial world champion Uber Cup teams, in the biggest events for individual players (such as the BWF World Championships, the All-England Championships, and the Olympic Games) Wei and her partners have usually been overshadowed by China's two dominant women's doubles pairs, Gao Ling and Huang Sui, and Yang Wei and Zhang Jiewen. One exception came at the 2007 All-Englands where Wei Yili and Zhang Yawen defeated both of these teams to capture the highly coveted title. Her other women's doubles titles include the China (2001), Singapore (2001, 2007), Denmark (2002, 2004), Thailand (2003), Indonesia (2006), and French (2007) Opens.

Wei has medaled four times at the BWF World Championships without "striking gold". She earned a silver with Zhang Jiewen in 2001, a silver with Zhao Tingting in 2003, a silver with Zhang Yawen in 2006, and a bronze with Zhang Yawen in 2007. She finished fourth at the 2004 Olympics in Athens with Zhao Tingting. At the 2008 Beijing Olympics Wei and Zhang Yawen were beaten in the semifinals by yet another Chinese pair, Du Jing and Yu Yang, who went on to win the gold medal. Wei and Zhang earned a bronze medal by defeating Japan's Miyuki Maeda and Satoko Suetsuna in the playoff for third place.

In 2008, Wei retired from the national team. She received an award during a ceremony to mark her retirement with five other teammates from the Chinese national badminton team on the sidelines of the China Open badminton event in Shanghai, November 23, 2008. However, she was still playing a year later by partnering with Gao Ling. They lost to Yang Wei and Zhang Jiewen in the Thailand Open final of 2009, but won the Philippines Open of 2009.

== Achievements ==
=== Olympic Games ===
Women's doubles
Year	Venue	Partner	Opponent	Score	Result
2008	Beijing University of Technology Gymnasium, Beijing, China	(China) Zhang Yawen	(Japan) Miyuki Maeda (Japan) Satoko Suetsuna	21–17, 21–10	Bronze

=== BWF World Championships ===
Women's doubles
Year	Venue	Partner	Opponent	Score	Result
2001	Palacio de Deportes de San Pablo, Seville, Spain	(China) Zhang Jiewen	(China) Gao Ling (China) Huang Sui	11–15, 15–17	Silver
2003	National Indoor Arena, Birmingham, England	(China) Zhao Tingting	(China) Gao Ling (China) Huang Sui	8–15, 11–15	Silver
2006	Palacio de Deportes de la Comunidad, Madrid, Spain	(China) Zhang Yawen	(China) Gao Ling (China) Huang Sui	21–23, 9–21	Silver
2007	Putra Indoor Stadium, Kuala Lumpur, Malaysia	(China) Zhang Yawen	(China) Yang Wei (China) Zhang Jiewen	21–19, 18–21, 16–21	Bronze

=== World Cup ===
Women's doubles
Year	Venue	Partner	Opponent	Score	Result
2005	Olympic Park, Yiyang, China	(China) Zhang Yawen	(China) Yang Wei (China) Zhang Jiewen	18–21, 15–21	Silver

=== Asian Championships ===
Women's doubles
Year	Venue	Partner	Opponent	Score	Result
2002	Nimibutr Stadium, Bangkok, Thailand	(China) Zhao Tingting	(China) Gao Ling (China) Huang Sui	5–11, 1–11	Bronze

=== World Junior Championships ===
Girls' doubles
Year	Venue	Partner	Opponent	Score	Result
2000	Tianhe Gymnasium, Guangzhou, China	(China) Zhang Yawen	(China) Li Yujia (China) Zhao Tingting	4–7, 7–2, 7–0, 7–1	Gold

Mixed doubles
Year	Venue	Partner	Opponent	Score	Result
2000	Tianhe Gymnasium, Guangzhou, China	(China) Zheng Bo	(China) Sang Yang (China) Zhang Yawen	3–7, 0–7, 6–8	Silver

=== Asian Junior Championships ===
Girls' doubles
Year	Venue	Partner	Opponent	Score	Result
1999	National Indoor Stadium – 1, Yangon, Myanmar	(China) Li Yujia	(China) Xie Xingfang (China) Zhang Jiewen	9–15, 6–15	Silver
2000	Nishiyama Park Gymnasium, Kyoto, Japan	(China) Zhang Yawen	(China) Li Yujia (China) Zhao Tingting	15–12, 15–5	Gold

Mixed doubles
Year	Venue	Partner	Opponent	Score	Result
1999	National Indoor Stadium – 1, Yangon, Myanmar	(China) Zheng Bo	(Indonesia) Hendri Kurniawan Saputra (Indonesia) Enny Erlangga	12–15, 16–17	Silver
2000	Nishiyama Park Gymnasium, Kyoto, Japan	(China) Zheng Bo	(China) Sang Yang (China) Zhang Yawen	Walkover	Gold

=== BWF Superseries ===
The BWF Superseries, which was launched on 14 December 2006 and implemented in 2007, is a series of elite badminton tournaments, sanctioned by the Badminton World Federation (BWF). BWF Superseries levels are Superseries and Superseries Premier. A season of Superseries consists of twelve tournaments around the world that have been introduced since 2011. Successful players are invited to the Superseries Finals, which are held at the end of each year.

Women's doubles
Year	Tournament	Partner	Opponent	Score	Result
2007	All England Open	(China) Zhang Yawen	(China) Yang Wei (China) Zhang Jiewen	21–16, 8–21, 24–22	(gold) Winner
2007	Singapore Open	(China) Zhang Yawen	(China) Yang Wei (China) Zhao Tingting	10–21, 21–19, 21–18	(gold) Winner
2007	French Open	(China) Zhang Yawen	(China) Yu Yang (China) Zhao Tingting	21–10, 21–15	(gold) Winner
2007	Hong Kong Open	(China) Zhang Yawen	(China) Du Jing (China) Yu Yang	20–22, 21–13, 17–21	(silver) Runner-up
2008	Swiss Open	(China) Zhang Yawen	(China) Yang Wei (China) Zhang Jiewen	18–21, 24–22, 8–21	(silver) Runner-up

BWF Super Series Finals tournament
BWF Super Series Premier tournament
BWF Super Series tournament

=== BWF Grand Prix ===
The BWF Grand Prix had two levels, the BWF Grand Prix and Grand Prix Gold. It was a series of badminton tournaments sanctioned by the Badminton World Federation (BWF) which was held from 2007 to 2017. The World Badminton Grand Prix has been sanctioned by the International Badminton Federation from 1983 to 2006.

Women's doubles
Year	Tournament	Partner	Opponent	Score	Result
2000	Denmark Open	(China) Zhang Jiewen	(China) Chen Lin (China) Jiang Xuelian	7–15, 3–15	(silver) Runner-up
2001	All England Open	(China) Zhang Jiewen	(China) Gao Ling (China) Huang Sui	15–10, 8–15, 9–15	(silver) Runner-up
2001	Singapore Open	(China) Zhang Jiewen	(China) Zhang Yawen (China) Zhao Tingting	8–6, 7–3, 7–4	(gold) Winner
2001	China Open	(China) Zhang Jiewen	(China) Huang Nanyan (China) Yang Wei	8–6, 7–3, 6–8, 8–7	(gold) Winner
2002	Denmark Open	(China) Zhao Tingting	(Netherlands) Mia Audina (Netherlands) Lotte Jonathans	11–3, 6–11, 11–9	(gold) Winner
2002	China Open	(China) Zhao Tingting	(China) Gao Ling (China) Huang Sui	9–11, 3–11	(silver) Runner-up
2003	Thailand Open	(China) Zhao Tingting	(South Korea) Lee Hyo-jung (South Korea) Yim Kyung-jin	11–9, 5–11, 11–6	(gold) Winner
2003	Swiss Open	(China) Zhao Tingting	(China) Yang Wei (China) Zhang Jiewen	7–11, 11–6, 4–11	(silver) Runner-up
2003	Japan Open	(China) Zhao Tingting	(China) Gao Ling (China) Huang Sui	13–10, 6–11, 5–11	(silver) Runner-up
2004	Japan Open	(China) Zhao Tingting	(South Korea) Lee Kyung-won (South Korea) Ra Kyung-min	6–15, 15–5, 1–15	(silver) Runner-up
2004	Denmark Open	(China) Zhao Tingting	(China) Zhang Dan (China) Zhang Yawen	15–13, 12–15, 15–7	(gold) Winner
2004	German Open	(China) Zhao Tingting	(China) Zhang Dan (China) Zhang Yawen	8–15, 12–15	(silver) Runner-up
2004	China Open	(China) Zhao Tingting	(China) Yang Wei (China) Zhang Jiewen	14–15, 12–15	(silver) Runner-up
2005	German Open	(China) Zhao Tingting	(China) Gao Ling (China) Huang Sui	4–15, 10–15	(silver) Runner-up
2005	All England Open	(China) Zhao Tingting	(China) Gao Ling (China) Huang Sui	10–15, 13–15	(silver) Runner-up
2005	Japan Open	(China) Zhao Tingting	(China) Yang Wei (China) Zhang Jiewen	12–15, 2–15	(silver) Runner-up
2006	China Masters	(China) Zhang Yawen	(China) Gao Ling (China) Huang Sui	12–21, 21–18, 14–21	(silver) Runner-up
2006	Indonesia Open	(China) Zhang Yawen	(China) Yang Wei (China) Zhang Jiewen	21–13, 21–13	(gold) Winner
2006	Japan Open	(China) Zhang Yawen	(China) Gao Ling (China) Huang Sui	15–21, 17–21	(silver) Runner-up
2006	China Open	(China) Zhang Yawen	(China) Yang Wei (China) Zhang Jiewen	17–21, 7–21	(silver) Runner-up
2009	Philippines Open	(China) Gao Ling	(Indonesia) Shendy Puspa Irawati (Indonesia) Meiliana Jauhari	21–11, 21–11	(gold) Winner
2009	Thailand Open	(China) Gao Ling	(China) Yang Wei (China) Zhang Jiewen	24–22, 17–21, 15–21	(silver) Runner-up

BWF Grand Prix Gold tournament
BWF Grand Prix tournament

=== IBF International ===
Women's doubles
Year	Tournament	Partner	Opponent	Score	Result
2002	French International	(China) Zhang Jiewen	(China) Zhang Yawen (China) Zhao Tingting	7–1, 7–2, 5–7, 5–7, 2–7	(silver) Runner-up
