= Li Yujia =

Singaporean badminton player

Li Yujia 李羽佳
Personal information
- Born: 18 January 1983 (age 43) Jingzhou, Hubei, China
- Height: 1.75 m (5 ft 9 in)
- Weight: 60 kg (132 lb)

Sport
- Country: Singapore
- Sport: Badminton
- Handedness: Right
- Coached by: Eng Hian

Women's & mixed doubles
- Highest ranking: 7 (WD); 7 (XD)
- BWF profile
Medal record
Women's badminton
Representing Singapore
Asian Games
Bronze medal – third place	2006 Doha	Women's team
Asian Championships
Bronze medal – third place	2006 Johor Bahru	Mixed doubles
Commonwealth Games
Silver medal – second place	2006 Melbourne	Women's doubles
Southeast Asian Games
Silver medal – second place	2005 Manila	Women's team
Silver medal – second place	2007 Nakhon Ratchasima	Women's team
Bronze medal – third place	2005 Manila	Women's doubles
Bronze medal – third place	2005 Manila	Mixed doubles
Bronze medal – third place	2007 Nakhon Ratchasima	Women's doubles
Bronze medal – third place	2007 Nakhon Ratchasima	Mixed doubles
Bronze medal – third place	2009 Vientiane	Women's team
Representing China
World Junior Championships
Gold medal – first place	2000 Guangzhou	Mixed team
Silver medal – second place	2000 Guangzhou	Girls' doubles
Asian Junior Championships
Gold medal – first place	1999 Yangon	Girls' team
Gold medal – first place	2000 Kyoto	Girls' team
Silver medal – second place	1999 Yangon	Girls' doubles
Silver medal – second place	2000 Kyoto	Girls' doubles

Li Yujia (Simplified Chinese: 李羽佳; born 18 January 1983) is a Chinese-born Singaporean badminton player who competed at the 2008 Summer Olympics in the women's and mixed doubles event. Born in Jingzhou, Hubei in 1983, she moved to Singapore at the age of 18 and is now a Singapore citizen. Partnered with Hendri Saputra in the mixed doubles and Jiang Yanmei in the women's doubles, she has gained recognition in the badminton scene for her agility, smashing skills and good looks.

== Achievements ==
=== Commonwealth Games ===
Women's doubles
Year	Venue	Partner	Opponent	Score	Result
2006	Melbourne Convention and Exhibition Centre; Melbourne, Australia	(Singapore) Jiang Yanmei	(Malaysia) Chin Eei Hui (Malaysia) Wong Pei Tty	17–21, 19–21	Silver

=== Asian Championships ===
Mixed doubles
Year	Venue	Partner	Opponent	Score	Result
2006	Bandaraya Stadium; Johor Bahru, Malaysia	(Singapore) Hendri Saputra	(Thailand) Sudket Prapakamol (Thailand) Saralee Thungthongkam	21–14, 19–21, 9–21	Bronze

=== Southeast Asian Games ===
Women's doubles
Year	Venue	Partner	Opponent	Score	Result
2005	PhilSports Arena; Metro Manila, Philippines	(Singapore) Jiang Yanmei	(Malaysia) Chin Eei Hui (Malaysia) Wong Pei Tty	8–15, 12–15	Bronze
2007	Wongchawalitkul University; Nakhon Ratchasima, Thailand	(Singapore) Jiang Yanmei	(Indonesia) Vita Marissa (Indonesia) Liliyana Natsir	21–17, 13–21, 13–21	Bronze

Mixed doubles
Year	Venue	Partner	Opponent	Score	Result
2005	PhilSports Arena; Metro Manila, Philippines	(Singapore) Hendri Saputra	(Indonesia) Nova Widianto (Indonesia) Liliyana Natsir	8–15, 4–15	Bronze
2007	Wongchawalitkul University; Nakhon Ratchasima, Thailand	(Singapore) Hendri Saputra	(Indonesia) Flandy Limpele (Indonesia) Vita Marissa	18–21, 21–18, 9–21	Bronze

=== World Junior Championships ===
Girls' doubles
Year	Venue	Partner	Opponent	Score	Result
2000	Tianhe Gymnasium; Guangzhou, China	(China) Zhao Tingting	(China) Wei Yili (China) Zhang Yawen	7–4, 2–7, 0–7, 1–7	Silver

=== Asia Junior Championships ===
Girls' doubles
Year	Venue	Partner	Opponent	Score	Result
1999	National Indoor Stadium – 1 Yangon, Myanmar	(China) Wei Yili	(China) Xie Xingfang (China) Zhang Jiewen	9–15, 6–15	Silver
2000	Nishiyama Park Gymnasium; Kyoto, Japan	(China) Zhao Tingting	(China) Zhang Yawen (China) Wei Yili	3–15, 12–15	Silver

=== BWF Grand Prix ===
The BWF Grand Prix had two levels, the Grand Prix and Grand Prix Gold. It was a series of badminton tournaments sanctioned by the Badminton World Federation (BWF) and played between 2007 and 2017. The World Badminton Grand Prix was sanctioned by the International Badminton Federation from 1983 to 2006.

Women's doubles
Year	Tournament	Partner	Opponent	Score	Result
2006	Bitburger Open	(Singapore) Jiang Yanmei	(Indonesia) Rani Mundiasti (Indonesia) Endang Nursugianti	21–11, 21–19	(gold) Winner
2006	New Zealand Open	(Singapore) Jiang Yanmei	(Malaysia) Lim Pek Siah (Malaysia) Joanne Quay	21–11, 19–21, 21–15	(gold) Winner

Mixed doubles
Year	Tournament	Partner	Opponent	Score	Result
2005	China Masters	(Singapore) Hendri Saputra	(China) Zhang Jun (China) Gao Ling	7–15, 13–15	(silver) Runner-up
2006	Bitburger Open	(Singapore) Hendri Saputra	(Poland) Robert Mateusiak (Poland) Nadieżda Kostiuczyk	24–22, 16–21, 8–21	(silver) Runner-up
2006	New Zealand Open	(Singapore) Hendri Saputra	(Singapore) Hendra Wijaya (Singapore) Frances Liu	21–11, 21–12	(gold) Winner
2007	Dutch Open	(Singapore) Hendri Saputra	(Denmark) Rasmus Bonde (Denmark) Christinna Pedersen	16–21, 14–21	(silver) Runner-up

BWF Grand Prix Gold tournament
BWF Grand Prix tournament

=== International Series/Satellite ===
Women's doubles
Year	Tournament	Partner	Opponent	Score	Result
2001	Malaysia Satellite	(China) Cheng Jiao	(Malaysia) Chin Eei Hui (Malaysia) Wong Pei Tty	7–5, 8–6, 7–3	(gold) Winner
2003	Singapore Satellite	(Singapore) Jiang Yanmei	(Malaysia) Norhasikin Amin (Malaysia) Fong Chew Yen	15–8, 15–1	(gold) Winner
2003	India Satellite	(Singapore) Jiang Yanmei	(Thailand) Duanganong Aroonkesorn (Thailand) Kunchala Voravichitchaikul	15–9, 15–11	(gold) Winner
2004	Iran Fajr International	(Singapore) Jiang Yanmei	(Japan) Yoshiko Iwata (Japan) Miyuki Tai	15–4, 15–12	(gold) Winner
2004	Croatian International	(Singapore) Jiang Yanmei	(Singapore) Shinta Mulia Sari (Singapore) Xing Aiying	15–4, 15–1	(gold) Winner
2004	Mauritius International	(Singapore) Jiang Yanmei	(Hong Kong) Koon Wai Chee (Hong Kong) Li Wing Mui	12–15, 15–5, 15–9	(gold) Winner
2005	Cheers Asian Satellite	(Singapore) Jiang Yanmei	(South Korea) Ha Jung-eun (South Korea) Kim Min-jung	15–3, 15–1	(gold) Winner

Mixed doubles
Year	Tournament	Partner	Opponent	Score	Result
2003	Singapore Satellite	(Singapore) Hendri Saputra	(Thailand) Nuttaphon Narkthong (Thailand) Kunchala Voravichitchaikul	17–14, 15–2	(gold) Winner
2003	India Satellite	(Singapore) Hendri Saputra	(Thailand) Nuttaphon Narkthong (Thailand) Kunchala Voravichitchaikul	15–4, 15–6	(gold) Winner
2004	Mauritius International	(Singapore) Kendrick Lee	(Singapore) Denny Setiawan (Singapore) Frances Liu	15–6, 15–5	(gold) Winner
2005	Cheers Asian Satellite	(Singapore) Hendri Saputra	(South Korea) Lee Yong-dae (South Korea) Ha Jung-eun	15–6, 15–8	(gold) Winner
