= Hendri Saputra =

Singapoeran badminton player (born 1981)

Hendri Kurniawan Saputra
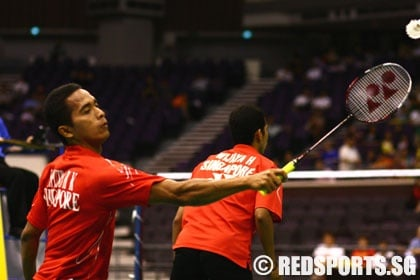

Personal information
- Born: 12 May 1981 (age 45) Semarang, Central Java, Indonesia
- Height: 1.72 m (5 ft 7 1/2 in)
- Weight: 68 kg (150 lb)

Sport
- Country: Singapore
- Sport: Badminton
- Handedness: Right
- Highest ranking: 20 (MD With Hendra Wijaya 11 March 2010)
- BWF profile
Medal record
Men's badminton
Representing Singapore
Commonwealth Games
Bronze medal – third place	2006 Melbourne	Mixed doubles
Bronze medal – third place	2010 Delhi	Men's doubles
Asian Championships
Bronze medal – third place	2006 Johor Bahru	Mixed doubles
SEA Games
Silver medal – second place	2007 Nakhon Ratchasima	Men's doubles
Silver medal – second place	2007 Nakhon Ratchasima	Men's team
Bronze medal – third place	2005 Manila	Mixed doubles
Bronze medal – third place	2007 Nakhon Ratchasima	Mixed doubles
Bronze medal – third place	2009 Vientiane	Men's team
Representing Indonesia
Asian Junior Championships
Gold medal – first place	1999 Yangon	Boys' team
Gold medal – first place	1999 Yangon	Mixed doubles
Silver medal – second place	1999 Yangon	Boys' doubles

Hendri Kurniawan Saputra (born 12 May 1981) is an Indonesian-born Singaporean retired badminton player.

== Career ==
Saputra and his brother, Hendra Wijaya, joined the Singapore Badminton Association (SBA) in 2000 and both became Singapore citizens after five years. He won a silver medal, along with his brother and also partner, Hendra Wijaya, in the men's doubles, and bronze with Li Yujia in the mixed doubles at the 2007 SEA Games in Thailand.

Saputra represented Singapore at the 2006 Commonwealth Games in Melbourne, Australia, where he competed in the mixed doubles. Playing with Li Yujia, he defeated Kenya's Victor Odera and Irene Kerimah, Canada's Mike Beres and Valerie Loker, and Australia's Travis Denney and Kate Wilson-Smith in the preliminary rounds, before losing out the semi-final match to English pair Nathan Robertson and Gail Emms, with a score of 21–19, 14–21, and 17–21. Despite their semi-final loss, Saputra and Li managed to beat the neighbouring Malaysian duo Koo Kien Keat and Wong Pei Tty for the bronze medal victory, attaining a three-set score of 21–14, 21–23, and 21–6.

Saputra also qualified for the mixed doubles at the 2008 Summer Olympics in Beijing, by placing thirteenth and granting an entry as one of the top 15 seeded teams from the Badminton World Federation's ranking list. Playing with Li Yujia for the second time, Saputra lost the preliminary round match to Danish pair and European champions Thomas Laybourn and Kamilla Rytter Juhl, with a score of 12–21 and 14–21.

At the 2010 Commonwealth Games in Delhi, India, Saputra reunited his partner Hendra Wijaya in the men's doubles. The Singaporean pair defeated Northern Ireland's Matthew Gleave and Tony Stephenson, Isle of Man's Joshua Green and Matthew Wilkinson, and Scotland's Watson Briggs and Paul van Rietvelde in the preliminary rounds, before losing out the semi-final match to Malaysian duo Tan Boon Heong and Koo Kien Keat, with a unanimous score of 11–21 and 8–21. Saputra and Wijaya proceeded to the bronze medal match, where they defeated fellow Singaporean badminton players Derek Wong and Chayut Triyachart for the medal, attaining a score of 23–21 and 21–12. Shortly after his second Commonwealth Games, Saputra and his brother, Hendra Wijaya, announced their resignations from the Singapore national badminton team, citing difficult targets and no positions in the SBA as sparring partners.
