= Huang Sui =

Badminton player

Huang Sui 黄穗
Personal information
- Born: 8 January 1982 (age 44) Hunan, China
- Height: 1.72 m (5 ft 8 in)

Sport
- Country: Australia
- Sport: Badminton
- Handedness: Right
- Event: Women's doubles

Women's doubles
- BWF profile
Medal record
Women's badminton
Representing China
Olympic Games
Silver medal – second place	2004 Athens	Women's doubles
World Championships
Gold medal – first place	2006 Madrid	Women's doubles
Gold medal – first place	2003 Birmingham	Women's doubles
Gold medal – first place	2001 Seville	Women's doubles
Silver medal – second place	2007 Kuala Lumpur	Women's doubles
Silver medal – second place	2005 Anaheim	Women's doubles
World Cup
Gold medal – first place	2006 Yiyang	Women's doubles
Sudirman Cup
Gold medal – first place	2005 Beijing	Mixed team
Gold medal – first place	2001 Seville	Mixed team
Uber Cup
Gold medal – first place	2006 Sendai & Tokyo	Women's team
Gold medal – first place	2004 Jakarta	Women's team
Gold medal – first place	2002 Guangzhou	Women's team
Asian Games
Gold medal – first place	2006 Doha	Women's doubles
Gold medal – first place	2006 Doha	Women's team
Gold medal – first place	2002 Busan	Women's team
Silver medal – second place	2002 Busan	Women's doubles
Asian Championships
Gold medal – first place	2001 Manila	Women's doubles
Silver medal – second place	2002 Bangkok	Women's doubles
World Junior Championships
Silver medal – second place	1998 Melbourne	Girls' doubles
Bronze medal – third place	1998 Melbourne	Mixed doubles
Asian Junior Championships
Gold medal – first place	1998 Kuala Lumpur	Girls' doubles
Gold medal – first place	1998 Kuala Lumpur	Mixed doubles
Gold medal – first place	1998 Kuala Lumpur	Girls' team

Huang Sui (simplified Chinese: 黄穗; traditional Chinese: 黃穗; pinyin: Huáng Suì; born 8 January 1982) is a Chinese-Australian female badminton player.

== Career ==
Although Huang has won the Chinese National mixed doubles title almost all of her many international titles have come in women's doubles with Gao Ling, in a partnership where Huang's strength and consistency in the backcourt have complemented Gao's ability in the forecourt. They have captured over thirty top tier events since 2001, sharing dominance at the world level with their Chinese teammates and rivals Yang Wei and Zhang Jiewen. Huang and Gao have been especially successful at the All-England Championships, winning a record six consecutive finals there, three of them over Yang and Zhang, from 2001 through 2006. They reached the final of five consecutive editions of the BWF World Championships; winning in 2001, 2003, and 2006, and finishing second to Yang and Zhang in 2005 and 2007. Huang was a silver medalist with Gao at the 2004 Athens Olympics also won by Yang and Zhang. Neither team figured in the medals at the 2008 Olympics (won by another Chinese pair, Du Jing and Yu Yang). Huang has been a member of China's perennial world champion Uber Cup (women's international) team since 2002. In 2005 Huang's smash was clocked at 257 kilometres per hour (160 mph). She retired from the sport at the end of the 2007 season and subsequently moved to Sydney, Australia with her husband.

After a long absence from the sport Huang returned to the court in 2012, this time as an Australian.

== Achievements ==
=== Olympic Games ===
Women's doubles
Year	Venue	Partner	Opponent	Score	Result
2004	Goudi Olympic Hall; Athens, Greece	(China) Gao Ling	(China) Yang Wei (China) Zhang Jiewen	15–7, 4–15, 8–15	Silver

=== World Championships ===
Women's doubles
Year	Venue	Partner	Opponent	Score	Result
2007	Putra Indoor Stadium; Kuala Lumpur, Malaysia	(China) Gao Ling	(China) Yang Wei (China) Zhang Jiewen	16–21, 19–21	Silver
2006	Palacio de Deportes de la Comunidad de Madrid; Madrid, Spain	(China) Gao Ling	(China) Zhang Yawen (China) Wei Yili	23–21, 21–9	Gold
2005	Arrowhead Pond; Anaheim, United States	(China) Gao Ling	(China) Yang Wei (China) Zhang Jiewen	16–17, 7–15	Silver
2003	National Indoor Arena; Birmingham, England	(China) Gao Ling	(China) Wei Yili (China) Zhao Tingting	15–8, 15–11	Gold
2001	Palacio de Deportes de San Pablo; Seville, Spain	(China) Gao Ling	(China) Zhang Jiewen (China) Wei Yili	15–11, 17–15	Gold

=== World Cup ===
Women's doubles
Year	Venue	Partner	Opponent	Score	Result
2006	Olympic Park, Yiyang, China	(China) Gao Ling	(China) Yang Wei (China) Zhang Jiewen	21–19, 21–6	Gold

=== Asian Games ===
Women's doubles
Year	Venue	Partner	Opponent	Score	Result
2006	Aspire Hall 3 Doha, Qatar	(China) Gao Ling	(China) Yang Wei (China) Zhang Jiewen	18–21, 23–21, 21–14	Gold
2002	Gangseo Gymnasium; Busan, South Korea	(China) Gao Ling	(South Korea) Lee Kyung-won (South Korea) Ra Kyung-min	8–11, 7–11	Silver

=== Asian Championships ===
Women's doubles
Year	Venue	Partner	Opponent	Score	Result
2002	Bangkok, Thailand	(China) Gao Ling	(China) Yang Wei (China) Zhang Jiewen	8–11, 6–11	Silver
2001	Manila, Philippines	(China) Gao Ling	(Indonesia) Deyana Lomban (Indonesia) Vita Marissa	12–15, 15–4, 15–6	Gold

=== World Junior Championships ===
Girls' doubles
Year	Venue	Partner	Opponent	Score	Result
1998	Sports and Aquatic Centre; Melbourne, Australia	(China) Gong Ruina	(China) Zhang Jiewen (China) Xie Xingfang	15–3, 13–15, 10–15	Silver

Mixed doubles
Year	Venue	Partner	Opponent	Score	Result
1998	Sports and Aquatic Centre; Melbourne, Australia	(China) Jiang Shan	(South Korea) Choi Min-ho (South Korea) Lee Hyo-jung	11–15, 6–15	Bronze

=== Asian Junior Championships ===
Girls' doubles
Year	Venue	Partner	Opponent	Score	Result
1998	Kuala Lumpur Badminton Stadium; Kuala Lumpur, Malaysia	(China) Gong Ruina	(South Korea) Lee Hyo-jung (South Korea) Jun Woul-sihk	15–13, 15–8	Gold

Mixed doubles
Year	Venue	Partner	Opponent	Score	Result
1998	Kuala Lumpur Badminton Stadium; Kuala Lumpur, Malaysia	(China) Jiang Shan	(Malaysia) Chan Chong Ming (Malaysia) Joanne Quay	6–15, 15–8, 15–11	Gold

=== BWF Superseries (2 titles) ===
The BWF Superseries, launched on 14 December 2006 and implemented in 2007, is a series of elite badminton tournaments, sanctioned by Badminton World Federation (BWF). BWF Superseries has two level such as Superseries and Superseries Premier. A season of Superseries features twelve tournaments around the world, which introduced since 2011, with successful players invited to the Superseries Finals held at the year end.

Women's doubles
Year	Tournament	Partner	Opponent	Score	Result
2007	Korea Open	(China) Gao Ling	(China) Yang Wei (China) Zhang Jiewen	12–21, 21–14, 21–16	(gold) Winner
2007	Malaysia Open	(China) Gao Ling	(Indonesia) Greysia Polii (Indonesia) Vita Marissa	19–21, 21–12, 21–11	(gold) Winner

BWF Super Series Finals tournament
BWF Super Series Premier tournament
BWF Super Series tournament

=== BWF Grand Prix (23 titles, 16 runners-up) ===
The BWF Grand Prix has two levels: Grand Prix and Grand Prix Gold. It is a series of badminton tournaments, sanctioned by Badminton World Federation (BWF) since 2007. The World Badminton Grand Prix has been sanctioned by the International Badminton Federation since 1983.

Women's doubles
Year	Tournament	Partner	Opponent	Score	Result
2007	Macau Open	(China) Gao Ling	(South Korea) Lee Kyung-won (South Korea) Lee Hyo-jung	21–15, 21–7	(gold) Winner
2007	Thailand Open	(China) Gao Ling	(China) Du Jing (China) Yu Yang	Walkover	(gold) Winner
2006	Japan Open	(China) Gao Ling	(China) Zhang Yawen (China) Wei Yili	21–15, 21–17	(gold) Winner
2006	Hong Kong Open	(China) Gao Ling	(China) Yang Wei (China) Zhang Jiewen	19–21, 21–15, 19–21	(silver) Runner-up
2006	Macau Open	(China) Gao Ling	(South Korea) Lee Hyo-jung (South Korea) Lee Kyung-won	17–21, 21–14, 21–14	(gold) Winner
2006	Chinese Taipei Open	(China) Gao Ling	(South Korea) Lee Hyo-jung (South Korea) Lee Kyung-won	18–21, 21–9, 17–21	(silver) Runner-up
2006	Malaysia Open	(China) Gao Ling	(China) Du Jing (China) Yu Yang	9–21, 21–16, 21–17	(gold) Winner
2006	China Masters	(China) Gao Ling	(China) Zhang Yawen (China) Wei Yili	21–12, 18–21, 21–14	(gold) Winner
2006	All England Open	(China) Gao Ling	(China) Yang Wei (China) Zhang Jiewen	6–15, 15–11, 15–2	(gold) Winner
2006	German Open	(China) Gao Ling	(China) Yang Wei (China) Zhang Jiewen	15–3, 11–15, 10–15	(silver) Runner-up
2005	China Open	(China) Gao Ling	(China) Yang Wei (China) Zhang Jiewen	10–15, 4–15	(silver) Runner-up
2005	Hong Kong Open	(China) Gao Ling	(China) Yang Wei (China) Zhang Jiewen	13–15, 15–8, 6–15	(silver) Runner-up
2005	China Masters	(China) Gao Ling	(China) Du Jing (China) Yu Yang	4–15, 14–17	(silver) Runner-up
2005	Malaysia Open	(China) Gao Ling	(China) Yang Wei (China) Zhang Jiewen	6–15, 8–15	(silver) Runner-up
2005	Singapore Open	(China) Gao Ling	(China) Zhang Dan (China) Zhang Yawen	13–15, 10–15	(silver) Runner-up
2005	All England Open	(China) Gao Ling	(China) Wei Yili (China) Zhao Tingting	15–10, 15–13	(gold) Winner
2005	German Open	(China) Gao Ling	(China) Wei Yili (China) Zhao Tingting	15–4, 15–10	(gold) Winner
2004	Malaysia Open	(China) Gao Ling	(China) Yang Wei (China) Zhang Jiewen	7–15, 6–15	(silver) Runner-up
2004	All England Open	(China) Gao Ling	(China) Yang Wei (China) Zhang Jiewen	Walkover	(gold) Winner
2004	Swiss Open	(China) Gao Ling	(China) Yang Wei (China) Zhang Jiewen	Walkover	(gold) Winner
2003	China Open	(China) Gao Ling	(China) Yang Wei (China) Zhang Jiewen	15–8, 15–12	(gold) Winner
2003	Hong Kong Open	(China) Gao Ling	(China) Yang Wei (China) Zhang Jiewen	17–14, 15–5	(gold) Winner
2003	Malaysia Open	(China) Gao Ling	(China) Yang Wei (China) Zhang Jiewen	5–15, 15–1, 15–17	(silver) Runner-up
2003	Indonesia Open	(China) Gao Ling	(China) Yang Wei (China) Zhang Jiewen	Walkover	(gold) Winner
2003	Singapore Open	(China) Gao Ling	(China) Yang Wei (China) Zhang Jiewen	16–17, 7–15	(silver) Runner-up
2003	Japan Open	(China) Gao Ling	(China) Wei Yili (China) Zhao Tingting	10–13, 11–6, 11–5	(gold) Winner
2003	All England Open	(China) Gao Ling	(China) Yang Wei (China) Zhang Jiewen	11–9, 11–7	(gold) Winner
2002	China Open	(China) Gao Ling	(China) Wei Yili (China) Zhao Tingting	11–9, 11–3	(gold) Winner
2002	Indonesia Open	(China) Gao Ling	(Thailand) Sujitra Ekmongkolpaisarn (Thailand) Saralee Thungthongkam	11–5, 11–4	(gold) Winner
2002	Japan Open	(China) Gao Ling	(South Korea) Lee Kyung-won (South Korea) Ra Kyung-min	5–7, 7–1, 2–7, 8–6, 1–7	(silver) Runner-up
2002	Korea Open	(China) Gao Ling	(China) Chen Lin (China) Jiang Xuelian	7–2, 7–3, 5–7, 7–3	(gold) Winner
2002	All England Open	(China) Gao Ling	(China) Zhang Jiewen (China) Wei Yili	7–3, 7–5, 8–7	(gold) Winner
2001	Malaysia Open	(China) Gao Ling	(China) Huang Nanyan (China) Yang Wei	1–7, 7–4, 3–7, 0–7	(silver) Runner-up
2001	Japan Open	(China) Gao Ling	(China) Huang Nanyan (China) Yang Wei	15–13, 15–10	(gold) Winner
2001	All England Open	(China) Gao Ling	(China) Wei Yili (China) Zhang Jiewen	10–15, 15–8, 15–9	(gold) Winner
2000	German Open	(China) Lu Ying	(Japan) Yoshiko Iwata (Japan) Haruko Matsuda	15–5, 15–3	(gold) Winner
1999	Hong Kong Open	(China) Lu Ying	(China) Chen Lin (China) Jiang Xuelian	17–15, 12–15, 8–15	(silver) Runner-up
1999	All England Open	(China) Lu Ying	(South Korea) Chung Jae-hee (South Korea) Ra Kyung-min	6–15, 8–15	(silver) Runner-up
1999	Swedish Open	(China) Lu Ying	(South Korea) Chung Jae-hee (South Korea) Ra Kyung-min	6–15, 11–15	(silver) Runner-up

BWF Grand Prix Gold tournament
BWF Grand Prix tournament
