= Chinese National Badminton Championships =

The Chinese National Badminton Championships is a tournament organized to crown the best badminton players in China.

== Past winners ==
Year	Men's singles	Women's singles	Men's doubles	Women's doubles	Mixed doubles	Men's Team	Women's Team	Ref
1956	Wang Wenjiao	Lin Xiaoyu						
1957	Chen Fushou	Lin Xiaoyu						
1958	Wang Wenjiao		Chen Fushou; Wang Wenjiao		Chen Fushou; Chen Jiayan			
1959^{1}	Wang Wenjiao	Chen Jiayan	Wang Wenjiao; Chen Fushou	Chen Jiayan; Huang Bin	Chen Fushou; Chen Jiayan			
1960			Yang Rensu					
1961	Hou Jiachang							
1962								
1963	Hou Jiachang	Liang Xiaomu		Chen Yuniang; Liang Xiaomu				
1964		Chen Yuniang		Chen Yuniang				
1965^{1}	Tang Xianhu	Chen Yuniang	Lin Jiancheng; Wu Junsheng	Chen Yuniang; Lin Jianying		Fujian	Hubei	
1972	Hou Jiachang	Chen Yuniang		Chen Yuniang				
1973	Hou Jiachang	Chen Yuniang		Chen Yuniang				
1974	Tang Xianhu	Chen Yuniang		Chen Yuniang				
1975^{1}	Tang Xianhu	Liang Qiuxia	Tang Xianhu; Wu Junsheng	Li Fang; Liang Qiuxia	Wu Junsheng; Qiu Yufang	Fujian		
1976								
1977								
1978	Lin Yixiong				Chen Yue			
1979^{1}	Yan Yujiang	Liu Xia	Lin Shinchuan; He Lianping	Qiu Yufang; Chen Xiuyu	Li Mao; Fu Chune	Fujian	Shanghai	
1980	Yan Yujiang	Li Lingwei	Lin Jiangli; Luan Jin	Li Lingwei; Sang Yanqin				
1981	Chen Tianlung	Zheng Yuli	Chen Yue	Lin Ying; Wu Dixi	Chen Yue			
1982				Lin Ying; Wu Dixi	Lin Jiangli; Lin Ying			
1983^{1}	Han Jian	Li Lingwei	Zhao Jianhua; Sun Zhian	Lin Ying; Wu Dixi	Lin Jiangli; Lin Ying	Liaoning	Guangdong	
1984				Lin Ying; Wu Dixi	Lao Yujing			
1985	Zhang Qingwu							
1986								
1987^{1}	Yang Yang	Li Lingwei	Tian Bingyi; Li Yongbo	Han Aiping; Li Lingwei	Zhou Jincan; Lin Ying	Jiangsu	Fujian	
1988		Tang Jiuhong						
1989								
1990				Nong Qunhua				
1991	Wan Zhengwen		Chen Yu; Zheng Shoutai	Fan Linhua; Ye Sichuan				
1992	Lin Liwen	Hu Ning	Huang Zhanzong; Zheng Yumin	Lin Yanfen; Yao Fen	Zhao Jianhua; Sun Man	Fujian	Guangdong	
1993^{1}	Zhao Jianhua	Tang Jiuhong	Chen Hongyong; Zheng Yumin	Lin Yanfen; Yao Fen	Zhao Jianhua; Sun Man	Fujian	Jiangsu	
1994	No competition							
1995	Dong Jiong	Ye Zhaoying	Huang Zhanzhong; Jiang Xin	Qin Yiyuan; Tang Yongshu	Chen Xingdong; Peng Xinyong	Jiangsu	Guangdong	
1996	Chen Gang	Yao Yan	Ge Cheng; Tao Xiaoqiang	Qin Yiyuan; Tang Yongshu	Chen Xingdong; Peng Xinyong	Jiangsu	Hubei	
1997^{1}	Chen Gang	Ye Zhaoying	Jiang Xin; Liu Yong	Ge Fei; Gu Jun	Liu Yong; Ge Fei	Jiangsu	Hunan	
1998	Sun Jun	Gong Zhichao	Liu Yong; Zhang Jun	Ge Fei; Gu Jun	Liu Yong; Ge Fei	Jiangsu	Jiangsu	
1999	Dong Jiong	Gong Zhichao	Chen Qiqiu; Yu Jinhao	Ge Fei; Gu Jun	Zhang Jun; Gu Jun	Fujian	Jiangsu	
2000	Chen Hong	Zhou Mi	Wang Wei; Zhang Wei	Lu Ying; Gao Qian	Yang Ming; Huang Nanyan	Fujian	Guangdong	
2001^{1}	Luo Yigang	Gong Zhichao	Wang Wei; Zhang Wei	Yang Wei; Zhang Jiewen	Sun Jun; Ge Fei	Jiangsu	Hunan	
2002	Chen Yu	Dai Yun	Chen Qiqiu; Liu Yong	Chen Lin; Jiang Xuelian	Zheng Bo; Zhang Yawen	Fujian	Guangdong	
2003	Chen Yu	Xie Xingfang	Chen Qiqiu; Fu Haifeng	Yang Wei; Zhang Jiewen	Chen Qiqiu; Zhang Jiewen	Fujian	Guangdong	
2004	Lin Dan	Wang Rong	Sang Yang; Zhang Wei	Du Jing; Yu Yang	Liu Zhiyuan; Zhang Zhibo	Fujian	Guangdong	
2005^{1}	Lin Dan	Jiang Yanjiao	Zhang Jun; Cai Yun	Gao Ling; Wei Yili	Zheng Bo; Huang Sui	Jiangsu	Hunan	
2006	Chen Yu	Zhu Jingjing	He Hanbin; Shen Ye	Zhang Dan; Zhang Zhibo	He Hanbin; Feng Chen	Fujian	People's Liberation Army (Bayi)	
2007^{2}	Chen Jin	Wang Yihan	Ding Yang; Zhang Wei	Wang Xiaoli; Zhao Yunlei	Chen Zhiben; Zhang Jinkang	Xiamen	Nanjing	
2008	Zhou Wenlong	Zhu Jingjing	Luo Jiening; Zhu Lihua	Ma Jin; Wang Siyun	Zhang Nan; Xie Jing	Fujian	Guangdong	
2009^{1}	Lin Dan	Wang Lin	Cai Yun; Xu Chen	Du Jing; Yu Yang	He Hanbin; Zhao Tingting	Jiangsu	Jiangsu	
2010	Li Yu	Han Li	Li Rui; Rao Yuqiang	Sun Xiaoli; Tang Jinhua	Kang Jun; Sun Xiaoli	Jiangsu	Hunan	
2011	Huang Yuxiang	Xia Jingyun	Li Tian; Zhang Moran	Ou Dongni; Zhong Qianxin	Kang Jun; Sun Xiaoli	Beijing	People's Liberation Army (Bayi)	
2012	Chen Yuekun	Xia Jingyun	Sang Yang; Wang Sijie	Mei Qili; Ou Dongni	He Hanbin; Xiao Jia	Fujian	Jiangsu	
2013^{1}	Lin Dan	Li Xuerui	Guo Zhendong; Hong Wei	Wang Xiaoli; Zhao Yunlei	Lu Kai; Yu Yang	Fujian	People's Liberation Army (Bayi)	
2014	Wang Zhengming	Hui Xirui	Cai Yun; Kang Jun	Jia Yifan; Xia Huan	Kang Jun; Tang Jinhua	Zhejiang	Zhejiang	
2015	Shi Yuqi	He Bingjiao	Wang Sijie; Zheng Siwei	Ou Dongni; Yu Xiaohan	Liu Yuchen; Luo Yu	Zhejiang	Jiangsu	
2016	Zhao Junpeng	Chen Yufei	Liu Xiaolong; Ou Xuanyi	Du Yue; Li Yinhui	Wang Zekang; Wu Yingshi	Beijing	Guangdong	
2017^{1}	Lin Dan	Chen Yufei	Liu Cheng; Wang Yilyu	Luo Ying; Luo Yu	Zheng Siwei; Chen Qingchen	Beijing	Jiangsu	
2018	Zhang Weiyi	Zhou Meng	Chai Biao; Zhang Wen	Liu Xuanxuan; Xia Yuting	Pei Tianyi; Wu Qianqian	Fujian	Hunan	
2019	Sun Feixiang	Zhou Meng	Tao Jianqi; Wang Sijie	Chen Mingchun; Gao Ziyao	Tao Jianqi; Ni Bowen	Zhejiang	Hubei	
2020	Weng Hongyang	Chen Yufei	Feng Yanzhe; Liu Yuchen	Chen Xiaofei; Feng Xueying	Zheng Siwei; Huang Yaqiong	Hunan	Fujian	
2021^{1}	Shi Yuqi	Chen Yufei	Wang Chang; Zhou Haodong	Chen Qingchen; Jia Yifan	Wang Yilyu; Huang Dongping	Fujian	Hubei	
2022	Wang Zhengxing	Han Qianqian	Guo Yuchen; Wu Yifei	Keng Shuliang; Zhang Chi	Chen Sihang; Zhou Xinru	Shanghai	Zhejiang	
2023	Liu Liang	Cai Yanyan	Xie Haonan; Zhu Haiyuan	Chen Xiaofei; Feng Xueying	Zhou Zhihong; Tang Ruizhi	Zhejiang	Jiangsu	
2024	Zhao Junpeng	Cai Yanyan	Liu Yang; Tan Qiang	Chen Xiaofei; Feng Xueying	Shen Xuanyao; Wu Mengying	Zhejiang	Fujian	
2025^{1}	Weng Hongyang	Wang Zhiyi	Liu Yang; Liu Yi	Huang Dongping; Tan Ning	Zheng Siwei; Huang Yaqiong	Jiangsu	Zhejiang	

^1 Chinese National Games ^2 National City Games
