= 2001 IBF World Championships =

Tournament details
- Dates: 3 June – 10 June
- Edition: 12th
- Level: International
- Venue: Palacio de Deportes de San Pablo
- Location: Seville, Spain

The 2001 IBF World Championships, also known as the World Badminton Championships, were held in the Palacio de Deportes de San Pablo, Seville, Spain, between 3 June and 10 June 2001.

== Host city selection ==
Eindhoven, Seville, and Seoul submitted bids to host the championships. The Korean bid was withdrawn at the last minute. Seville was announced as the host by International Badminton Federation during a council meeting in Copenhagen.

== Medalists ==
=== Medal table ===
* Host nation (Spain)

Rank	Nation	Gold	Silver	Bronze	Total
1	China	3	2	4	9
2	Indonesia	2	0	1	3
3	South Korea	0	2	1	3
4	Denmark	0	1	2	3
5	Malaysia	0	0	2	2
Totals (5 entries)		5	5	10	20

=== Events ===
Event	Gold	Silver	Bronze
Men's singles	(Indonesia) Hendrawan	(Denmark) Peter Gade	(Indonesia) Taufik Hidayat
Men's singles	(Indonesia) Hendrawan	(Denmark) Peter Gade	(China) Chen Hong
Women's singles	(China) Gong Ruina	(China) Zhou Mi	(China) Gong Zhichao
Women's singles	(China) Gong Ruina	(China) Zhou Mi	(China) Zhang Ning
Men's doubles	(Indonesia) Tony Gunawan (Indonesia) Halim Haryanto	(South Korea) Ha Tae-kwon (South Korea) Kim Dong-moon	(Malaysia) Chew Choon Eng (Malaysia) Chan Chong Ming
Men's doubles	(Indonesia) Tony Gunawan (Indonesia) Halim Haryanto	(South Korea) Ha Tae-kwon (South Korea) Kim Dong-moon	(Malaysia) Choong Tan Fook (Malaysia) Lee Wan Wah
Women's doubles	(China) Gao Ling (China) Huang Sui	(China) Zhang Jiewen (China) Wei Yili	(South Korea) Ra Kyung-min (South Korea) Lee Kyung-won
Women's doubles	(China) Gao Ling (China) Huang Sui	(China) Zhang Jiewen (China) Wei Yili	(China) Chen Lin (China) Jiang Xuelian
Mixed doubles	(China) Zhang Jun (China) Gao Ling	(South Korea) Kim Dong-moon (South Korea) Ra Kyung-min	(Denmark) Michael Søgaard (Denmark) Rikke Olsen
Mixed doubles	(China) Zhang Jun (China) Gao Ling	(South Korea) Kim Dong-moon (South Korea) Ra Kyung-min	(Denmark) Jens Eriksen (Denmark) Mette Schjoldager
