= 2005 IBF World Championships – Women's doubles =

Women's doubles at the 2005 IBF World Championships
- Venue: Arrowhead Pond
- Location: Anaheim, United States
- Dates: August 15, 2005 – August 21, 2005

Medalists
gold medal	Yang Wei; Zhang Jiewen	China
silver medal	Gao Ling; Huang Sui	China
bronze medal	Zhang Dan; Zhang Yawen	China
bronze medal	Lee Kyung-won; Lee Hyo-jung	South Korea

The 2005 IBF World Championships (World Badminton Championships) took place in Arrowhead Pond in Anaheim, United States, between August 15 and August 21, 2005. Following the results in the women's doubles.

== Seeds ==
1. (China) Yang Wei / Zhang Jiewen, Champions
2. (China) Gao Ling / Huang Sui, Runners-up
3. (China) Wei Yili / Zhao Tingting, Quarter-final
4. (South Korea) Lee Kyung-won / Lee Hyo-jung, Semi-final
5. (China) Zhang Dan / Zhang Yawen, Semi-final
6. (Thailand) Saralee Thungthongkam / Sathinee Chankrachangwong, Quarter-final
7. (Malaysia) Wong Pei Tty / Chin Eei Hui, Quarter-final
8. (England) Gail Emms / Donna Kellogg, Quarter-final
9. (England) Ella Tripp / Joanne Wright, Second round
10. (Singapore) Jiang Yanmei / Li Yujia, Third round
11. (England) Tracey Hallam / Natalie Munt, Third round
12. (Chinese Taipei) Chien Yu-chin / Cheng Wen-hsing, Third round
13. (Denmark) Helle Nielsen / Pernille Harder, Third round
14. (Canada) Charmaine Reid / Helen Nichol, Second round
15. (Japan) Kumiko Ogura / Reiko Shiota, First round
16. (England) Liza Parker / Suzanne Rayappan, Third round

== Main stage ==
=== Section 1 ===
First round
(China) Yang Wei (China) Zhang Jiewen
bye
(Bulgaria) Linda Zetchiri (Bulgaria) Diana Dimova
bye
(Chinese Taipei) Chien Yu-chin (Chinese Taipei) Cheng Wen-hsing	15	15
(Canada) Denyse Julien (Canada) Milaine Cloutier	7	7
(Hong Kong) Koon Wai Chee (Hong Kong) Li Wing Mui	15	15
(Iceland) Sara Jónsdóttir (England) Ragna Ingólfsdóttir	13	5
(England) Gail Emms (England) Donna Kellogg
bye
(Thailand) Kunchala Voravichitchaikul (Thailand) Duanganong Aroonkesorn	15	15
(France) Amélie Decelle (France) Élisa Chanteur	2	3
(Denmark) Helle Nielsen (Denmark) Pernille Harder	15	15
(Finland) Anu Nieminen (Finland) Nina Weckström	2	4
(Sweden) Johanna Persson (Sweden) Elin Bergblom	15	15
(Estonia) Piret Hamer (Estonia) Helen Reino	10	8

Second round
(China) Yang Wei (China) Zhang Jiewen	15	15
(Bulgaria) Linda Zetchiri (Bulgaria) Diana Dimova	0	2
(Chinese Taipei) Chien Yu-chin (Chinese Taipei) Cheng Wen-hsing	15	13	15
(Hong Kong) Koon Wai Chee (Hong Kong) Li Wing Mui	8	15	5
(England) Gail Emms (England) Donna Kellogg	15	15
(Thailand) Kunchala Voravichitchaikul (Thailand) Duanganong Aroonkesorn	3	7
(Denmark) Helle Nielsen (Denmark) Pernille Harder	17	15
(Sweden) Johanna Persson (Sweden) Elin Bergblom	14	10

Third round
(China) Yang Wei (China) Zhang Jiewen	15	15
(Chinese Taipei) Chien Yu-chin (Chinese Taipei) Cheng Wen-hsing	6	13
(England) Gail Emms (England) Donna Kellogg	15	15
15	(Denmark) Helle Nielsen (Denmark) Pernille Harder	8	5

Quarterfinals
(China) Yang Wei (China) Zhang Jiewen	15	15
(England) Gail Emms (England) Donna Kellogg	7	10

=== Section 2 ===
First round
(South Korea) Lee Kyung-won (South Korea) Lee Hyo-jung
bye
(Italy) Agnese Allegrini (Italy) Hui Ding	15	15
(Russia) Anna Larchenko (Switzerland) Huwaina Razi	13	5
(England) Liza Parker (England) Suzanne Rayappan	15	15
(Scotland) Imogen Bankier (Scotland) Emma Mason	12	11
(United States) Mesinee Mangkalakiri (United States) Eva Lee	w.o.
(Singapore) Shinta Mulia Sari (Singapore) Xing Aiying
(Malaysia) Wong Pei Tty (Malaysia) Chin Eei Hui
bye
(Japan) Miyuki Maeda (Japan) Satoko Suetsuna	9	17	15
(Germany) Juliane Schenk (Germany) Nicole Grether	15	14	7
(England) Tracey Hallam (England) Natalie Munt	15	5	15
(Ukraine) Elena Nozdran (Ukraine) Larisa Griga	7	15	4
(New Zealand) Rebecca Bellingham (New Zealand) Rachel Hindley	15	15
(Slovenia) Maja Kersnik (Slovenia) Maja Tvrdy	1	5

Second round
(South Korea) Lee Kyung-won (South Korea) Lee Hyo-jung	15	15
(Italy) Agnese Allegrini (Italy) Hui Ding	3	5
(England) Liza Parker (England) Suzanne Rayappan	15	15
(United States) Mesinee Mangkalakiri (United States) Eva Lee	1	6
(Malaysia) Wong Pei Tty (Malaysia) Chin Eei Hui	12	15	15
(Japan) Miyuki Maeda (Japan) Satoko Suetsuna	15	6	9
(England) Tracey Hallam (England) Natalie Munt	15	15
(New Zealand) Rebecca Bellingham (New Zealand) Rachel Hindley	5	6

Third round
(South Korea) Lee Kyung-won (South Korea) Lee Hyo-jung	15	15
(England) Liza Parker (England) Suzanne Rayappan	2	1
(Malaysia) Wong Pei Tty (Malaysia) Chin Eei Hui	15	15
(England) Tracey Hallam (England) Natalie Munt	9	4

Quarterfinals
(South Korea) Lee Kyung-won (South Korea) Lee Hyo-jung	15	15
(Malaysia) Wong Pei Tty (Malaysia) Chin Eei Hui	6	5

=== Section 3 ===
First round
(China) Gao Ling (China) Huang Sui
bye
(Peru) Cristina Aicardi (Peru) Claudia Rivero
bye
(Singapore) Jiang Yanmei (Singapore) Li Yujia	17	15
(France) Élodie Eymard (France) Weny Rahmawati	14	10
(Japan) Aki Akao (Japan) Tomomi Matsuda	15	15
(South Africa) Michelle Edwards (Nigeria) Grace Daniel	7	2
(Thailand) Saralee Thungthongkam (Thailand) Sathinee Chankrachangwong
bye
(Chinese Taipei) Chou Chia-chi (Chinese Taipei) Ku Pei-ting	15	15
(United States) Jennifer Coleman (United States) Melinda Keszthelyi	8	5
(Malaysia) Lim Pek Siah (Malaysia) Chor Hooi Yee	15	15
(United States) Cindy Shi (United States) Jamie Subandhi	4	4
(England) Ella Tripp (England) Joanne Wright	w.o.
(Suriname) Jill Sjauw Mook (Suriname) Stephanie Jadi

Second round
(China) Gao Ling (China) Huang Sui	15	15
(Peru) Cristina Aicardi (Peru) Claudia Rivero	0	0
(Singapore) Jiang Yanmei (Singapore) Li Yujia	17	15
(Japan) Aki Akao (Japan) Tomomi Matsuda	15	11
(Thailand) Saralee Thungthongkam (Thailand) Sathinee Chankrachangwong	15	15
(Chinese Taipei) Chou Chia-chi (Chinese Taipei) Ku Pei-ting	2	8
(Malaysia) Lim Pek Siah (Malaysia) Chor Hooi Yee	15	3	15
(England) Ella Tripp (England) Joanne Wright	12	15	6

Third round
(China) Gao Ling (China) Huang Sui	15	15
(Singapore) Jiang Yanmei (Singapore) Li Yujia	2	8
(Thailand) Saralee Thungthongkam (Thailand) Sathinee Chankrachangwong	6	15	15
(Malaysia) Lim Pek Siah (Malaysia) Chor Hooi Yee	15	2	1

Quarterfinals
(China) Gao Ling (China) Huang Sui	15	15
(Thailand) Saralee Thungthongkam (Thailand) Sathinee Chankrachangwong	3	4

=== Section 4 ===
First round
(China) Zhang Dan (China) Zhang Yawen
bye
(Malaysia) Ooi Sock Ai (Malaysia) Mooi Hing Yau	15	15
(Scotland) Kirsteen McEwan-Miller (Scotland) Michelle Douglas	6	2
(Russia) Nina Vislova (Russia) Valeria Sorokina	8	15	15
(Malaysia) Fong Chew Yen (Malaysia) See Phui Leng	15	6	10
(Canada) Charmaine Reid (Canada) Helen Nichol	15	15
(New Zealand) Kimberly Windsor (New Zealand) Donna Cranston	6	9
(China) Wei Yili (China) Zhao Tingting
bye
(Chinese Taipei) Cheng Shao-chieh (Chinese Taipei) Cheng Hsiao-yun	15	15
(Netherlands) Rachel van Cutsen (Netherlands) Paulien van Dooremalen	11	1
(Poland) Kamila Augustyn (Poland) Nadieżda Kostiuczyk	11	15	15
(Japan) Miyuki Tai (Japan) Noriko Okuma	15	9	12
(Denmark) Lena Frier Kristiansen (Denmark) Kamilla Rytter Juhl	8	15	15
(Japan) Kumiko Ogura (Japan) Reiko Shiota	15	8	5

Second round
(China) Zhang Dan (China) Zhang Yawen	15	15
(Malaysia) Ooi Sock Ai (Malaysia) Mooi Hing Yau	4	6
(Russia) Nina Vislova (Russia) Valeria Sorokina	15	6	15
(Canada) Charmaine Reid (Canada) Helen Nichol	3	15	11
(China) Wei Yili (China) Zhao Tingting	15	15
(Chinese Taipei) Cheng Shao-chieh (Chinese Taipei) Cheng Hsiao-yun	1	4
(Poland) Kamila Augustyn (Poland) Nadieżda Kostiuczyk	15	12	15
(Denmark) Lena Frier Kristiansen (Denmark) Kamilla Rytter Juhl	8	15	12

Third round
(China) Zhang Dan (China) Zhang Yawen	15	15
(Russia) Nina Vislova (Russia) Valeria Sorokina	0	0
(China) Wei Yili (China) Zhao Tingting	15	15
(Poland) Kamila Augustyn (Poland) Nadieżda Kostiuczyk	4	10

Quarterfinals
(China) Zhang Dan (China) Zhang Yawen	15	15
(China) Wei Yili (China) Zhao Tingting	8	9

== Final stage ==
Quarterfinals
(China) Yang Wei (China) Zhang Jiewen	15	15
(England) Gail Emms (England) Donna Kellogg	7	10
(South Korea) Lee Kyung-won (South Korea) Lee Hyo-jung	15	15
(Malaysia) Wong Pei Tty (Malaysia) Chin Eei Hui	6	5
(China) Gao Ling (China) Huang Sui	15	15
(Thailand) Saralee Thungthongkam (Thailand) Sathinee Chankrachangwong	3	4
(China) Zhang Dan (China) Zhang Yawen	15	15
(China) Wei Yili (China) Zhao Tingting	8	9

Semifinals
(China) Yang Wei (China) Zhang Jiewen	15	15
(South Korea) Lee Kyung-won (South Korea) Lee Hyo-jung	4	3
(China) Gao Ling (China) Huang Sui	15	15
(China) Zhang Dan (China) Zhang Yawen	5	8

Finals
(China) Yang Wei (China) Zhang Jiewen	17	15
(China) Gao Ling (China) Huang Sui	16	7
