= Luxembourgish National Badminton Championships =

Badminton tournament in Luxembourg

The Luxembourgish National Badminton Championships is a tournament organized to crown the best badminton players in Luxembourg. They are held since 1984.

== Past winners ==
Year	Men's singles	Women's singles	Men's doubles	Women's doubles	Mixed doubles
1984	Romain Fritz	Martine Ludwig	No competition		
1985	Willy Groff	Martine Ludwig	No competition		
1986	Romain Fritz	Martine Ludwig	No competition		
1987	Willy Groff	Colette Christnach	D. Croise; R. Moes	Colette Christnach; Anne Marie Nau	Romain Fritz; Martine Ludwig
1988	Willy Groff	Colette Christnach	D. Croise; Marc Engelmann	Colette Christnach; Anne Marie Nau	Romain Fritz; Martine Ludwig
1989	Willy Groff	Colette Christnach	Willy Groff; R. Moes	Colette Christnach; Anne Marie Nau	Marc Engelmann; Colette Christnach
1990	Pierre Bollig	Colette Christnach	Pierre Bollig; Henry Meyer	Colette Christnach; I. Feiereisen	Marc Engelmann; Colette Christnach
1991	Henry Meyer	Colette Christnach	Willy Groff; R. Moes	Colette Christnach; I. Feiereisen	Marc Engelmann; Colette Christnach
1992	Pierre Bollig	Anne-Marie Nau	Pierre Bollig; Henry Meyer	Nancy Mauer; Pia Juchem	Marc Stolwijk; Isabelle Feiereisen
1993	Philippe Aulner	Anne-Marie Nau	Daniel Ruppert; Marc Engelmann	Martine Ludwig; Pia Juchem	Marc Stolwijk; Pascale Stolwijk
1994	Pierre Bollig	Martine Ludwig	Philippe Aulner; Tom Merker	Martine Ludwig; Angele Da Cruz	Marc Stolwijk; Pascale Stolwijk
1995	Christian Wagener	Martine Ludwig	Christian Wagener; Christian Esch	Martine Ludwig; Angele Da Cruz	Christian Esch; Monique Mathiew
1996	Christian Wagener	Martine Ludwig	Marc Stolwijk; Marc Engelmann	Martine Ludwig; Angele Da Cruz	Tom Merker; Angele Da Cruz
1997	Tom Merker	Mireille Kosmala	Marc Engelmann; Daniel Ruppert	Mireille Kosmala; Mireille Lang	Yves Olinger; Anne-Marie Nau
1998	Tom Merker	Nicole Wagner	Yves Olinger; Michael D'Onghia	Sonja Deckenbrunnen; Monique Ludovicy	Yves Olinger; Anne-Marie Nau
1999	Yves Olinger	Nicole Wagner	Yves Olinger; Michael D'Onghia	Nicole Wagner; Mireille Kosmala	Marc Stollwijk; Mireille Kosmala
2000	Yves Olinger	Mireille Kosmala	Tom Merker; Christian Wagener	Gaby Weissen; Mireille Kosmala	Yves Olinger; Anne-Marie Nau
2001	Yves Olinger	Anne-Marie Nau	Yves Olinger; Michael D'Onghia	Nicole Wagner; Gaby Weissen	Marc Schintgen; Gaby Weissen
2002	Yves Olinger	Mireille Kosmala	Yves Olinger; Michael D'Onghia	Annemarie Nau; Claudine Parisot	Yves Olinger; Annemarie Nau
2003	Yves Olinger	Michèle Bock	Yves Olinger; Marc Stolwijk	Mireille Kosmala; Sandra Schiltz	Yves Olinger; Annemarie Nau
2004	Mathieu Serebriakoff	Claudine Barnig	Mathieu Serebriakoff; Philippe Hengen	Claudine Barnig; Michèle Bock	Yves Olinger; Claudine Barnig
2005	Yves Olinger	Claudine Barnig	Yves Olinger; André Frederes	Claudine Barnig; Michèle Bock	Philippe Hengen; Claudine Barnig
2006	Philippe Hengen	Claudine Barnig	Yves Olinger; Philippe Hengen	Claudine Barnig; Zoé Schroeder	Philippe Hengen; Claudine Barnig
2007	Philippe Hengen	Claudine Barnig	Yves Olinger; Philippe Hengen	Claudine Barnig; Zoé Schroeder	Philippe Hengen; Claudine Barnig
2008	Philippe Hengen	Lisa Hariati	Ben Speltz; Philippe Hengen	Claudine Barnig; Zoé Schroeder	Philippe Hengen; Claudine Barnig
2009	Ben Speltz	Lisa Hariati	Ben Speltz; Philippe Hengen	Claudine Barnig; Zoé Schroeder	Philippe Hengen; Claudine Barnig
2010	Ben Speltz	Lisa Hariati	Eric Solagna; Yann Hellers	Claudine Barnig; Zoé Schroeder	Philippe Hengen; Claudine Barnig
2011	Robert Mann	Claudine Barnig	Ben Speltz; Philippe Hengen	Lisa Hariati; Elena Nozdran	Valeriy Strelcov; Elena Nozdran
2012	Yann Hellers	Claudine Barnig	Yann Hellers; Eric Solagna	Lisa Hariati; Dominique Schummer	Mike Vallenthini; Myriam Have
2013	Eric Solagna	Claudine Barnig	Akis Thomas; Mike Vallenthini	Myriam Have; Elena Nozdran	Valeriy Strelcov; Tessy Aulner
2014	Robert Mann	Stefka Hargiono	Mathieu Serebriakoff; Eric Solagna	Myriam Have; Elena Nozdran	Mike Vallenthini; Myriam Havé
2015	Mike Vallenthini	Tessy Aulner	Akis Thomas; Mike Vallenthini	Xenia Loi; Aude Meyer	Mike Vallenthini; Tessy Aulner
2016	Robert Mann	Stefka Hargiono	Akis Thomas; Mike Vallenthini	Stefka Hargiono; Myriam Havé	Robert Mann; Myriam Havé
2017	Robert Mann	Tessy Aulner	Robert Mann; Mike Vallenthini	Diana Campos; Elena Nozdran	Valeriy Strelcov; Elena Nozdran
2018	Robert Mann	Elena Nozdran	Robert Mann; Mike Vallenthini	Julie Aulner; Tessy Aulner	Mike Vallenthini; Tessy Aulner
2019	Robert Mann	Myriam Havé	Eric Solagna; Mike Vallenthini	Joëlle Jungbluth; Myriam Havé	Eric Solagna; Myriam Havé
2020	Robert Mann	Myriam Havé	Eric Solagna; Mike Vallenthini	Joëlle Jungbluth; Myriam Havé	Eric Solagna; Myriam Havé
2021	Jérôme Pauquet	Myriam Havé	Eric Solagna; Mike Vallenthini	Myriam Havé; Joëlle Jungbluth	Eric Solagna; Myriam Havé
2022	Jérôme Pauquet	Myriam Havé	Eric Solagna; Mike Vallenthini	Myriam Havé; Joëlle Jungbluth	Eric Solagna; Myriam Havé
2023	Jérôme Pauquet	Kim Schmidt	Yannick Feltes; Jérôme Pauquet	Myriam Havé; Joëlle Jungbluth	Yannick Feltes; Zoé Sinico
2024	Jérôme Pauquet	Myriam Havé	William Wang; Yves Hoffmann	Tessy Aulner; Myriam Havé	William Wang; Myriam Havé
2025	Jérôme Pauquet	Myriam Havé	Nico Fiorino; Jérôme Pauquet	Tessy Aulner; Myriam Havé	William Wang; Myriam Havé
