= Chen Fushou =

Indonesian-born Chinese badminton player and coach (1932–2020)

Chen Fushou 陈福寿
Personal information
- Born: Tan Hok Sioe 陈福寿; 10 January 1932 Dutch East Indies
- Died: 31 January 2020 (aged 88)

Sport
- Country: China
- Sport: Badminton
- Handedness: Right
- Event: Men's singles, Men's doubles & Mixed doubles

Chen Fushou (Chinese: 陈福寿; 10 January 1932 – 31 January 2020) was an Indonesian-born Chinese badminton player and coach. He won gold medals at the Chinese National Badminton Championships (men's singles) and the 1st National Games of China (men's doubles and mixed doubles). He later became the head coach of the China national women's badminton team, which won 25 team or individual world championships under his leadership, including two Uber Cups (1984 and 1986).

== Biography ==
Chen was born 10 January 1932 in the Dutch East Indies (now Indonesia), to an ethnic Chinese family with ancestral roots in Tong'an, Fujian. He was a member of the Indonesia national badminton team. In 1954, he and his close friend and teammate Wang Wenjiao decided to return to China, and became two of the founders of badminton in the country. In December 1956, the duo helped establish the Fujian provincial badminton team, the first badminton team in the People's Republic of China. They also wrote the first badminton textbook in China, which was published in 1957.

In 1957, Chen won the men's singles gold medal at the Chinese National Badminton Championships. During the 1st National Games of China in 1959, he won the men's doubles gold medal with Wang Wenjiao and the mixed doubles gold medal with Chen Jiayan. However, as the People's Republic of China was not a member of the International Badminton Federation at the time, he never played for China internationally.

Chen retired from his playing career in 1962 due to injuries and became a coach for the Fujian women's badminton team. In 1972, he was appointed the head coach of the China national women's badminton team. During his decades-long coaching career, he trained national and world champions including Chen Yuniang, Liang Qiuxia, Zhang Ailing, Liu Xia, Li Lingwei, Han Aiping, Tang Jiuhong, and Ye Zhaoying. He led the China national women's team to win 25 team or individual world championships. The team won the gold medal at the 7th, 8th, and 9th Asian Games, as well as the Uber Cup in 1984 and 1986.

Between 1978 and 1990, Chen was awarded eight national sports medals. In 1989, he was voted one of the best coaches in the first four decades of the People's Republic of China. On 18 May 2002, the Badminton World Federation honoured him with the Distinguished Service Award.

Chen died from a heart attack on 31 January 2020, aged 88.
