= 2001 IBF World Championships – Women's doubles =

Women's doubles at the 2001 IBF World Championships
- Venue: Palacio de Deportes de San Pablo
- Location: Seville, Spain
- Dates: June 3, 2001 – June 10, 2001

Medalists
gold medal	Gao Ling; Huang Sui	China
silver medal	Zhang Jiewen; Wei Yili	China
bronze medal	Ra Kyung-min; Lee Kyung-won	South Korea
bronze medal	Chen Lin; Jiang Xuelian	China

The 12th IBF World Championships, also known as the World Badminton Championships, were held in the Palacio de Deportes de San Pablo, Seville, Spain, between 3 June and 10 June 2001. Following the results in the women's doubles.

== Main stage ==
=== Section 1 ===
First round
(China) Gao Ling (China) Huang Sui	15	15
(Malaysia) Ang Li Peng (Malaysia) Wong Pei Tty	6	3
(South Korea) Jun Jae Youn (South Korea) Seo Yoon Hee	15	15
(France) Amelie Decelle (Kazakhstan) Irina Gritsenko	0	8
(Indonesia) Vita Marissa (Indonesia) Eti Tantri	15	15
(Scotland) Kirsteen McEwan (Scotland) Carol Tedman	2	4
(Germany) Anne Hönscheid (Germany) Kathrin Piotrowski	15	15
(Bulgaria) Victoria Hristova (New Zealand) Lianne Shirley	1	6
(Japan) Mika Anjo (Japan) Chikako Nakayama	15	15	15
(Denmark) Pernille Harder (Denmark) Majken Vange	12	17	5
(Poland) Agnieszka Czerwinska (Poland) Agnieszka Jaskula	15	15
(Wales) Robyn Ashworth (Wales) Kate Ridler	5	7
(New Zealand) Nicole Gordon (New Zealand) Rebecca Gordon	15	15
(Czech Republic) Eva Brozova (Czech Republic) Hana Milisova	10	1
(England) Emma Constable (England) Sarah Hardaker	15	15
(Portugal) Tania Faria (Portugal) Telma Santos	1	1

Second round
(China) Gao Ling (China) Huang Sui	15	15
(South Korea) Jun Jae Youn (South Korea) Seo Yoon Hee	4	6
(Indonesia) Vita Marissa (Indonesia) Eti Tantri	15	15
(Germany) Anne Hönscheid (Germany) Kathrin Piotrowski	7	4
(Japan) Mika Anjo (Japan) Chikako Nakayama	15	15
(Poland) Agnieszka Czerwinska (Poland) Agnieszka Jaskula	1	4
(New Zealand) Nicole Gordon (New Zealand) Rebecca Gordon	15	10	15
(England) Emma Constable (England) Sarah Hardaker	11	15	9

Third round
(China) Gao Ling (China) Huang Sui	15	15
(Indonesia) Vita Marissa (Indonesia) Eti Tantri	5	6
(Japan) Mika Anjo (Japan) Chikako Nakayama	15	15
(New Zealand) Nicole Gordon (New Zealand) Rebecca Gordon	4	12

Quarterfinals
(China) Gao Ling (China) Huang Sui	15	15
(Japan) Mika Anjo (Japan) Chikako Nakayama	4	5

=== Section 2 ===
First round
(China) Chen Lin (China) Jiang Xuelian	15	15
(Canada) Milaine Cloutier (Canada) Robbyn Hermitage	3	5
(Ukraine) Anna Khomenko (Ukraine) Elena Nozdran	15	15
(Austria) Sabine Franz (Austria) Simone Prutsch	13	4
(South Korea) Hwang Yu Mi (South Korea) Lee Hyo-jung	15	15
(Russia) Ella Karachkova (Russia) Anastasia Russkikh	5	5
(Chinese Taipei) Chou Chia-Chi (Chinese Taipei) Ku Pei-Ting	15	15
(Spain) Mercedes Cuenca (Spain) Yoana Martinez	3	10
(Denmark) Helene Kirkegaard (Denmark) Rikke Olsen	15	15
(England) Natalie Munt (England) Liza Parker	2	0
(Peru) Ximena Bellido (Peru) Lorena Blanco	6	15	15
(Iceland) Vigdis Asgeirsdottir (Iceland) Ragna Ingolfsdottir	15	9	4
(Japan) Kaori Mori (Japan) Megumi Oniike	15	15
(United States) Janis Tan (United States) Elie Wu	3	8
(Finland) Nina Weckström (Finland) Anu Weckström	15	15
(Mexico) Laura Amaya (Mexico) Gabriella Rodriguez	4	0

Second round
(China) Chen Lin (China) Jiang Xuelian	15	15
(Ukraine) Anna Khomenko (Ukraine) Elena Nozdran	1	7
(South Korea) Hwang Yu Mi (South Korea) Lee Hyo-jung	15	15
(Chinese Taipei) Chou Chia-Chi (Chinese Taipei) Ku Pei-Ting	10	0
(Denmark) Helene Kirkegaard (Denmark) Rikke Olsen	15	15
(Peru) Ximena Bellido (Peru) Lorena Blanco	0	3
(Japan) Kaori Mori (Japan) Megumi Oniike	15	15
(Finland) Nina Weckström (Finland) Anu Weckström	1	4

Third round
(China) Chen Lin (China) Jiang Xuelian	15	15
(South Korea) Hwang Yu Mi (South Korea) Lee Hyo-jung	10	11
(Denmark) Helene Kirkegaard (Denmark) Rikke Olsen	15	15
(Japan) Kaori Mori (Japan) Megumi Oniike	10	5

Quarterfinals
(China) Chen Lin (China) Jiang Xuelian	7	15	15
(Denmark) Helene Kirkegaard (Denmark) Rikke Olsen	15	3	7

=== Section 3 ===
First round
(China) Zhang Jiewen (China) Wei Yili	15	15
(Chinese Taipei) Chen Li-Chin (Chinese Taipei) Tsai Hui-Min	3	10
(England) Gail Emms (England) Donna Kellogg	15	15
(Spain) Amaya Munoz Arnau (Spain) Lucia Tavera	2	2
(Japan) Seiko Yamada (Japan) Shizuka Yamamoto	15	15
(Malaysia) Fong Chen Yen (Malaysia) Lim Pek Siah	9	7
(Bulgaria) Neli Boteva (Bulgaria) Diana Koleva	15	15
(South Africa) Chantal Botts (South Africa) Michelle Edwards	3	6
(Indonesia) Indarti Issolina (Indonesia) Deyana Lomban	15	15
(New Zealand) Rhona Robertson (New Zealand) Sara Runesten-Petersen	8	11
(Denmark) Ann-Lou Jorgensen (Denmark) Mette Schjoldager	15	15
(South Africa) Lina Fourie (South Africa) Antoinette Uys	0	2
(Germany) Nicole Grether (Germany) Nicol Pitro	15	15
(Peru) Sandra Jimeno (Peru) Doriana Rivera	2	4
(Austria) Verena Fastenbauer (Austria) Karina Lengauer	15	15
(Slovakia) Barbora Bobrovska (Slovakia) Eva Sladekova	6	2

Second round
(China) Zhang Jiewen (China) Wei Yili	w.o.
(England) Gail Emms (England) Donna Kellogg
(Japan) Seiko Yamada (Japan) Shizuka Yamamoto	15	15
(Bulgaria) Neli Boteva (Bulgaria) Diana Koleva	3	6
(Indonesia) Indarti Issolina (Indonesia) Deyana Lomban	15	15
(Denmark) Ann-Lou Jorgensen (Denmark) Mette Schjoldager	9	12
(Germany) Nicole Grether (Germany) Nicol Pitro	15	15
(Austria) Verena Fastenbauer (Austria) Karina Lengauer	2	3

Third round
(China) Zhang Jiewen (China) Wei Yili	15	15
(Japan) Seiko Yamada (Japan) Shizuka Yamamoto	2	10
(Indonesia) Indarti Issolina (Indonesia) Deyana Lomban	5	17	15
(Germany) Nicole Grether (Germany) Nicol Pitro	15	16	3

Quarterfinals
(China) Zhang Jiewen (China) Wei Yili	15	15
(Indonesia) Indarti Issolina (Indonesia) Deyana Lomban	8	8

=== Section 4 ===
First round
(South Korea) Ra Kyung-min (South Korea) Lee Kyung-won	15	15
(Scotland) Yuan Gao (Scotland) Sandra Watt	6	11
(Thailand) Sathinee Chankrachangwong (Thailand) Saralee Thungthongkam	15	15
(Iceland) Sara Jonsdottir (Iceland) Brynja Petursdottir	0	5
(China) Liu Zhen (China) Xiao Luxi	8	15	15
(Germany) Katja Michalowsky (Netherlands) Erica van den Heuvel	15	10	13
(Slovenia) Maja Pohar (Slovenia) Maja Tvrdy	w.o.
(Estonia) Piret Hamer (Estonia) Kati Tolmoff
(China) Huang Nanyan (China) Yang Wei	15	15
(Poland) Kamila Augustyn (Belarus) Nadieżda Kostiuczyk	6	8
(Germany) Carina Mette (Germany) Juliane Schenk	15	15
(Ukraine) Natalja Esipenko (Ukraine) Natalia Golovkina	11	5
(Chinese Taipei) Cheng Wen-Hsing (Chinese Taipei) Chien Yu-Chin	15	15
(England) Ella Miles (England) Sara Sankey	11	6
(Russia) Irina Rusljakova (Russia) Marina Yakusheva	15	15
(Wales) Felicity Gallup (Wales) Joanne Muggeridge	4	4

Second round
(South Korea) Ra Kyung-min (South Korea) Lee Kyung-won	15	15
(Thailand) Sathinee Chankrachangwong (Thailand) Saralee Thungthongkam	7	5
(China) Liu Zhen (China) Xiao Luxi	15	15
(Slovenia) Maja Pohar (Slovenia) Maja Tvrdy	1	1
(China) Huang Nanyan (China) Yang Wei	15	15
(Germany) Carina Mette (Germany) Juliane Schenk	2	1
(Chinese Taipei) Cheng Wen-Hsing (Chinese Taipei) Chien Yu-Chin	15	9	15
(Russia) Irina Rusljakova (Russia) Marina Yakusheva	13	15	13

Third round
(South Korea) Ra Kyung-min (South Korea) Lee Kyung-won	15	15
(China) Liu Zhen (China) Xiao Luxi	3	5
(China) Huang Nanyan (China) Yang Wei	15	15
(Chinese Taipei) Cheng Wen-Hsing (Chinese Taipei) Chien Yu-Chin	9	3

Quarterfinals
(South Korea) Ra Kyung-min (South Korea) Lee Kyung-won	10	17	17
(China) Huang Nanyan (China) Yang Wei	15	15	14

== Final stage ==
Quarterfinals
5	(China) Gao Ling (China) Huang Sui	15	15
(Japan) Mika Anjo (Japan) Chikako Nakayama	4	5
(China) Chen Lin (China) Jiang Xuelian	7	15	15
(Denmark) Helene Kirkegaard (Denmark) Rikke Olsen	15	3	7
8	(China) Zhang Jiewen (China) Wei Yili	15	15
(Indonesia) Indarti Issolina (Indonesia) Deyana Lomban	8	8
6	(South Korea) Ra Kyung-min (South Korea) Lee Kyung-won	10	17	17
(China) Huang Nanyan (China) Yang Wei	15	15	14

Semifinals
5	(China) Gao Ling (China) Huang Sui	w.o.
(China) Chen Lin (China) Jiang Xuelian
8	(China) Zhang Jiewen (China) Wei Yili	15	15
6	(South Korea) Ra Kyung-min (South Korea) Lee Kyung-won	11	3

Finals
5	(China) Gao Ling (China) Huang Sui	15	17
8	(China) Zhang Jiewen (China) Wei Yili	11	15
