= 2019 BWF World Senior Championships – 40+ =

Tournament details
- Dates: 4 August 2019 – 11 August 2019
- Edition: 9
- Level: International
- Competitors: 260 from 36 nations
- Venue: Spodek
- Location: Katowice, Poland

Champions
- Men's singles: (Germany) Thorsten Hukriede
- Women's singles: (Germany) Claudia Vogelgsang
- Men's doubles: (India) Ajit Haridas (India) Vijay Lancy Mascarenhas
- Women's doubles: (Iceland) Erla Björg Hafsteinsdóttir (Iceland) Drífa Harðardóttir
- Mixed doubles: (Japan) Hosemari Fujimoto (Japan) Rie Matsumoto

These are the results of 2019 BWF World Senior Championships' 40+ events.

== Men's singles ==
=== Seeds ===
1. (Japan) Hosemari Fujimoto (silver medalist)
2. (Thailand) Naruenart Chuaymak (quarterfinals)
3. (Switzerland) Oliver Colin (bronze medalist)
4. (Denmark) Morten Eilby Rasmussen (quarterfinals)
5. (Germany) Thorsten Hukriede (gold medalist)
6. (France) Xavier Engrand (fourth round)
7. (France) Thomas Blondeau (quarterfinals)
8. (Germany) Björn Wippich (quarterfinals)
9. (Japan) Kazuhiro Nomura (fourth round)
10. (India) Lakhwinder Pannu (third round)
11. (England) Wayne Philogene (second round)
12. (Sweden) Marcus Jansson (third round)
13. (Scotland) Mark Mackay (third round)
14. (Finland) Toni Kemppinen (fourth round)
15. (Denmark) Casper Lund (fourth round)
16. (Denmark) Lars Klintrup (fourth round)

=== Finals ===
Quarterfinals
1	(Japan) Hosemari Fujimoto	21	21
7	(France) Thomas Blondeau	11	11
3	(Switzerland) Oliver Colin	21	21
8	(Germany) Björn Wippich	11	7
5	(Germany) Thorsten Hukriede	21	21
4	(Denmark) Morten Eilby Rasmussen	13	12
(Switzerland) Conrad Hückstädt	21	21
2	(Thailand) Naruenart Chuaymak	19	14

Semifinals
1	(Japan) Hosemari Fujimoto	21	21
3	(Switzerland) Oliver Colin	7	19
5	(Germany) Thorsten Hukriede	19	8
(Switzerland) Conrad Hückstädt	21	10^{r}

Final
1	(Japan) Hosemari Fujimoto	21	9	13
5	(Germany) Thorsten Hukriede	19	21	21

=== Top half ===
==== Section 1 ====
First round
(Austria) R Bauer	12	11
(India) A Shaik	21	21

Second round
1	(Japan) H Fujimoto	21	21
(Sri Lanka) M S Fernando	8	15
(Finland) A Koljonen	21	21
(Slovakia) H Honisch	7	4
15	(Denmark) C Lund	21	21
(Estonia) T Vallikivi	9	7
(Switzerland) S Knöpfli	12	8
(India) A Shaik	21	21

Third round
1	(Japan) H Fujimoto	22	21	21
(Finland) A Koljonen	24	15	6
15	(Denmark) C Lund	21	21
(India) A Shaik	13	6

Fourth Round
1	(Japan) H Fujimoto	21	21
15	(Denmark) C Lund	18	15

==== Section 2 ====
First round
(Nepal) S Singha	10	16
(Latvia) I Keiss	21	21
(Sweden) N Kanebäck	16	10
(Ukraine) D Myznikov	21	21

Second round
7	(France) T Blondeau	21	21
(Spain) D de la Cruz	4	7
(Norway) E Lund	8	8
(Latvia) I Keiss	21	21
11	(England) W Philogene	9	11
(Germany) O Witte	21	21
(Poland) P Pohl	14	16
(Ukraine) D Myznikov	21	21

Third round
7	(France) T Blondeau	21	21
(Latvia) I Keiss	7	13
(Germany) O Witte	27	21
(Ukraine) D Myznikov	25	19

Fourth Round
7	(France) T Blondeau	21	21
(Germany) O Witte	8	6

==== Section 3 ====
First round
(Latvia) M Kažemaks	10	6
(Austria) H Hochgatterer	21	21

Second round
3	(Switzerland) O Colin	21	21
(Japan) T Minaguchi	8	14
(Norway) T Helander	21	10	17
(Czech Republic) M Šimo	11	21	21
13	(Scotland) M Mackay	21	21
(Slovakia) A Tekel	10	12
(India) S Mohd.	21	21
(Austria) H Hochgatterer	14	19

Third round
3	(Switzerland) O Colin	21	21
(Czech Republic) M Šimo	11	9
13	(Scotland) M Mackay	21	18	16
(India) S Mohd.	17	21	21

Fourth Round
3	(Switzerland) O Colin	21	21
(India) S Mohd.	15	11

==== Section 4 ====
First round
(Finland) I Kokko	21	21
(Portugal) P Oliveira	15	12
(Ukraine) S Kyryliuk	18	7
(United Arab Emirates) R R Bhat	21	21

Second round
8	(Germany) B Wippich	21	21
(Poland) M Pogon	14	17
(France) T Lefauconnier	13	13
(Finland) I Kokko	21	21
16	(Denmark) L Klintrup	21	21
(England) N Place	8	8
(Sweden) F du Hane	21	21
(United Arab Emirates) R R Bhat	19	19

Third round
8	(Germany) B Wippich	18	21	23
(Finland) I Kokko	21	19	21
16	(Denmark) L Klintrup	21	21
(Sweden) F du Hane	16	14

Fourth Round
8	(Germany) B Wippich	22	12	21
16	(Denmark) L Klintrup	20	21	15

=== Bottom half ===
==== Section 5 ====
First round
(Spain) D Gomez	w	/	o
(Nepal) P Chitrakar
(Sri Lanka) N Jayamanne	10	17
(England) S Tendayghabany	21	21

Second round
(Spain) D Gomez	8	5
(Switzerland) J Scheffler	21	21
(Slovakia) M Grman	10	14
9	(Japan) K Nomura	21	21
(England) S Tendayghabany	18	6
(Austria) M Grutschnig	21	21
(Sweden) E Dabbaghyan	13	18
5	(Germany) T Hukriede	21	21

Third round
(Switzerland) J Scheffler	11	11
9	(Japan) K Nomura	21	21
(Austria) M Grutschnig	8	16
5	(Germany) T Hukriede	21	21

Fourth Round
9	(Japan) K Nomura	12	21	16
5	(Germany) T Hukriede	21	17	21

==== Section 6 ====
First round
(Belgium) J Van den Brande	12	17
(Scotland) R Campbell	21	21
(United Arab Emirates) R Ramakrishnan	21	21
(Norway) J E Gulli	9	10

Second round
(Scotland) R Campbell	w	/	o
(Russia) K Myakishev
(France) J Mével	21	20	19
14	(Finland) T Kemppinen	16	22	21
(United Arab Emirates) R Ramakrishnan	21	11	16
(Poland) R Śmierzchalski	19	21	21
(Italy) L Novara	7	3
4	(Denmark) M E Rasmussen	21	21

Third round
(Scotland) R Campbell	15	20
14	(Finland) T Kemppinen	21	22
(Poland) R Śmierzchalski	15	12
4	(Denmark) M E Rasmussen	21	21

Fourth Round
14	(Finland) T Kemppinen	15	8
4	(Denmark) M E Rasmussen	21	21

==== Section 7 ====
First round
(Portugal) M Gloria	5	10
(Switzerland) C Hückstädt	21	21
(Finland) J Kohtala	19	21	21
(Ukraine) O Obraztsov	21	8	9

Second round
(Switzerland) C Hückstädt	21	21
(Poland) D Krawiec	10	8
(England) P A Mayfield	10	7
10	(India) L Pannu	21	21
(Finland) J Kohtala	21	21
(Slovakia) M Laznik	9	15
(Sri Lanka) S Wickramasinghe	9	8
6	(France) X Engrand	21	21

Third round
(Switzerland) C Hückstädt	21	21
10	(India) L Pannu	12	7
(Finland) J Kohtala	14	21	18
6	(France) X Engrand	21	16	21

Fourth Round
(Switzerland) C Hückstädt	21	21
6	(France) X Engrand	19	13

==== Section 8 ====
First round
(Germany) M Hilbrandt	22	18
(Denmark) H Pøhler	24	21

Second round
(Denmark) H Pøhler	21	20	21
(Japan) M Matsumoto	13	22	11
(Czech Republic) D Skrčený	15	10
12	(Sweden) M Jansson	21	21
(Latvia) V Liepkalns	21	20	21
(United Arab Emirates) S Kumar	10	22	11
(Austria) C Putz	8	8
2	(Thailand) N Chuaymak	21	21

Third round
(Denmark) H Pøhler	21	17	21
12	(Sweden) M Jansson	11	21	19
(Latvia) V Liepkalns	4	10
2	(Thailand) N Chuaymak	21	21

Fourth Round
(Denmark) H Pøhler	12	10
2	(Thailand) N Chuaymak	21	21

== Women's singles ==
=== Seeds ===
1. (Germany) Claudia Vogelgsang (gold medalist)
2. (Sri Lanka) Chandrika de Silva (silver medalist)
3. (England) Rebecca Pantaney (quarterfinals)
4. (Japan) Rie Matsumoto (bronze medalist)
5. (Japan) Maki Jin (third round)
6. (Germany) Stefanie Schmidt (quarterfinals)
7. (Poland) Monika Bieńkowska (third round)
8. (Sweden) Katja Wengberg (quarterfinals)

=== Finals ===
Semifinals
1	(Germany) Claudia Vogelgsang	18	21	27
(Luxembourg) Elena Nozdran	21	10	25
4	(Japan) Rie Matsumoto	11	21	15
2	(Sri Lanka) Chandrika de Silva	21	17	21

Final
1	(Germany) Claudia Vogelgsang	21	21	21
2	(Sri Lanka) Chandrika de Silva	23	14	17

=== Top half ===
==== Section 1 ====
First round
(Slovakia) K Tekeľová	10	4
(Norway) H Abusdal	21	21

Second round
1	(Germany) C Vogelgsang	21	21
(Poland) M Średnicka	9	12
(Switzerland) M-C Beaudoin Ekstrand	5	9
(India) P Mehta	21	21
5	(Japan) M Jin	21	21
(France) M Riaudel	5	10
(Finland) M Ramstedt	14	7
(Norway) H Abusdal	21	21

Third round
1	(Germany) C Vogelgsang	21	21
(India) P Mehta	12	16
5	(Japan) M Jin	11	15
(Norway) H Abusdal	21	21

Quarterfinals
1	(Germany) C Vogelgsang	21	11	21
(Norway) H Abusdal	18	21	17

==== Section 2 ====
First round
(Sweden) E M Lindqvist	9	7
(Switzerland) A Lartchenko Fischer	21	21

Second round
3	(England) R Pantaney	21	21
(Germany) B Recht	7	12
(France) S Roland	9	21	20
(India) S Kajla	21	19	22
7	(Poland) M Bieńkowska	21	21
(Ukraine) K Kulynych	13	7
(Luxembourg) E Nozdran	21	21
(Switzerland) A Lartchenko Fischer	13	19

Third round
3	(England) R Pantaney	21	21
(India) S Kajla	11	8
7	(Poland) M Bieńkowska	11	14
(Luxembourg) E Nozdran	21	21

Quarterfinals
3	(England) R Pantaney	16	21	15
(Luxembourg) E Nozdran	21	18	21

=== Bottom half ===
==== Section 3 ====
First round
(England) C Wheller	7	3
(Germany) S Galla	21	21
(Russia) M Kurochkina	21	21
(India) P Sangani	19	12

Second round
(Germany) S Galla	21	21
(Poland) J Herman	13	18
(Slovakia) M Fekečová
8	(Sweden) K Wengberg	w	/	o
(Russia) M Kurochkina	17	21	21
(France) C Gomes	21	13	13
(Switzerland) R Spörri	4	3
4	(Japan) R Matsumoto	21	21

Third round
(Germany) S Galla	13	16
8	(Sweden) K Wengberg	21	21
(Russia) M Kurochkina
4	(Japan) R Matsumoto	w	/	o

Quarterfinals
8	(Sweden) K Wengberg	18	16
4	(Japan) R Matsumoto	21	21

==== Section 4 ====
First round
(Poland) A Kocimska	21	21
(Switzerland) R Trottmann	11	10

Second round
(Poland) A Kocimska	18	14
(India) L Dhapre	21	21
(Norway) A Olsen	6	4
6	(Germany) S Schmidt	21	21
(England) S Vine	w	/	o
(Austria) U Edelmüller
(Finland) U Syrjävaara	4	7
2	(Sri Lanka) C de Silva	21	21

Third round
(India) L Dhapre	21	21	19
6	(Germany) S Schmidt	11	23	21
(England) S Vine	3	9
2	(Sri Lanka) C de Silva	21	21

Quarterfinals
6	(Germany) S Schmidt	11	13
2	(Sri Lanka) C de Silva	21	21

== Men's doubles ==
=== Seeds ===
1. (Bulgaria) Tihomir Kirov / Plamen Mihalev (third round)
2. (Germany) Christian Barthel / Alexander Schulz (second round)
3. (Denmark) Esben B. Kæmpegaard / Morten Eilby Rasmussen (silver medalists)
4. (Japan) Hosemari Fujimoto / Masayuki Matsumoto (quarterfinals)
5. (Japan) Tetsushi Minaguchi / Kazuhiro Nomura (third round)
6. (Switzerland) Oliver Colin / (Russia) Konstantin Myakishev (withdrew)
7. (Denmark) Johnny Hast Hansen / Kennet Herløv (second round)
8. (Denmark) Lars Klintrup / (Scotland) Mark Mackay (bronze medalists)

=== Finals ===
Semifinals
(France) Xavier Engrand (France) Jerome Krawczyk	13	21	8
(India) Ajit Haridas (India) Vijay Lancy Mascarenhas	21	18	21
3	(Denmark) Esben B. Kæmpegaard (Denmark) Morten Eilby Rasmussen	21	21
8	(Denmark) Lars Klintrup (Scotland) Mark Mackay	17	14

Final
(India) Ajit Haridas (India) Vijay Lancy Mascarenhas	19	21	21
3	(Denmark) Esben B. Kæmpegaard (Denmark) Morten Eilby Rasmussen	21	17	19

=== Top half ===
==== Section 1 ====
First round
(Finland) S Järvinen (Finland) M Marsela	w	/	o
(Nepal) P Chitrakar (Nepal) R Shah
(Latvia) V Liepkalns (Latvia) K Zakis	14	13
(England) M Boovanahalli Kg (England) W Philogene	21	21
(France) X Engrand (France) J Krawczyk	21	21
(Sri Lanka) N Jayamanne (Sri Lanka) D Nilushana Kithbewla Arachchi	13	8
(India) A Devdhar (India) M Utgikar	20	20
(Sweden) M Jansson (Sweden) C Wiklander	22	22
(Germany) F Koerber (Germany) B Wippich	21	21
(Poland) M Suski (Poland) G Włodarczyk	10	11
(Sweden) F du Hane (Denmark) H Pøhler	21	13	21
(United Arab Emirates) R R Bhat (United Arab Emirates) R Ramakrishnan	16	21	8

Second round
1	(Bulgaria) T Kirov (Bulgaria) P Mihalev	21	21
(Finland) S Järvinen (Finland) M Marsela	9	13
(England) M Boovanahalli Kg (England) W Philogene	16	11
(France) X Engrand (France) J Krawczyk	21	21
7	(Denmark) J Hast Hansen (Denmark) K Herløv	17	29	19
(Sweden) M Jansson (Sweden) C Wiklander	21	27	21
(Germany) F Koerber (Germany) B Wippich	21	21
(Sweden) F du Hane (Denmark) H Pøhler	18	19

Third round
1	(Bulgaria) T Kirov (Bulgaria) P Mihalev	12	14
(France) X Engrand (France) J Krawczyk	21	21
(Sweden) M Jansson (Sweden) C Wiklander	21	21
(Germany) F Koerber (Germany) B Wippich	16	16

Quarterfinals
(France) X Engrand (France) J Krawczyk	21	21
(Sweden) M Jansson (Sweden) C Wiklander	10	13

==== Section 2 ====
First round
(England) D Bates (England) N Place	21	21
(Bahrain) R Allapurath (Bahrain) J Mottil	12	7
(Germany) A Bernwald (Germany) H Zanssen	21	28
(France) B Deléris (France) J-J Nguyen	17	26
(Estonia) A Hoop (Estonia) T Vallikivi	21	21
(Portugal) P Oliveira (Belgium) J Van den Brande	18	11
SUB	(Switzerland) O Colin (Switzerland) P Kurz	17	14
(India) A Haridas (India) V L Mascarenhas	21	21
(Poland) R Kowalczyk (Poland) K Maślanka	21	26
(Sweden) N Kanebäck (Sweden) A Muth	18	24
(Slovakia) J Bacskai (Slovakia) H Honisch	17	9
(Sri Lanka) Jayaweera M (Sri Lanka) M Perera	21	21
(Austria) D Nahrebecki (Czech Republic) M Šimo	21	15
(Switzerland) J Favre (Switzerland) G Fischer	23	21

Second round
4	(Japan) H Fujimoto (Japan) M Matsumoto	21	21
(England) D Bates (England) N Place	18	13
(Germany) A Bernwald (Germany) H Zanssen	21	21
(Estonia) A Hoop (Estonia) T Vallikivi	6	10
(India) A Haridas (India) V L Mascarenhas	23	21
(Poland) R Kowalczyk (Poland) K Maślanka	21	16
(Sri Lanka) Jayaweera M (Sri Lanka) M Perera	21	7	15
(Switzerland) J Favre (Switzerland) G Fischer	18	21	21

Third round
4	(Japan) H Fujimoto (Japan) M Matsumoto	21	21
(Germany) A Bernwald (Germany) H Zanssen	11	15
(India) A Haridas (India) V L Mascarenhas	21	21
(Switzerland) J Favre (Switzerland) G Fischer	10	15

Quarterfinals
4	(Japan) H Fujimoto (Japan) M Matsumoto	21	10	16
(India) A Haridas (India) V L Mascarenhas	19	21	21

=== Bottom half ===
==== Section 3 ====
First round
(France) V Konkuyt (France) N Louis	22	19	24
(England) I Bashir (England) T Kuhn	20	21	22
(Estonia) Tai Talts (Estonia) Tan Talts	18	21	21
(Sweden) E Dabbaghyan (Switzerland) S Knöpfli	21	11	11
(Scotland) R Campbell (Scotland) F McCulloch	21	21	21
(Finland) J Atrila (Finland) I Kokko	23	14	18
(Italy) C A Di Marco (Italy) L Novara	7	8
5	(Japan) T Minaguchi (Japan) K Nomura	21	21
(Germany) A Schlüter (Germany) B Schneider	21	23	23
(India) L Pannu (India) O P Singh	16	25	21
(Sri Lanka) R Ferendo (Sri Lanka) S Wickramasinghe	21	21
(Slovakia) M Grman (Slovakia) P Socha	8	10
(Poland) S Hetmański (Poland) M Marek	21	17	21
(Ukraine) Y Chaichenko (Ukraine) O Obraztsov	16	21	9

Second round
(France) V Konkuyt (France) N Louis	17	16
(Estonia) Tai Talts (Estonia) Tan Talts	21	21
(Scotland) R Campbell (Scotland) F McCulloch	18	11
5	(Japan) T Minaguchi (Japan) K Nomura	21	21
(Germany) A Schlüter (Germany) B Schneider	21	21
(Sri Lanka) R Ferendo (Sri Lanka) S Wickramasinghe	11	10
(Poland) S Hetmański (Poland) M Marek	16	15
3	(Denmark) E B. Kæmpegaard (Denmark) M E Rasmussen	21	21

Third round
(Estonia) Tai Talts (Estonia) Tan Talts	w	/	o
5	(Japan) T Minaguchi (Japan) K Nomura
(Germany) A Schlüter (Germany) B Schneider	11	13
3	(Denmark) E B. Kæmpegaard (Denmark) M E Rasmussen	21	21

Quarterfinals
(Estonia) Tai Talts (Estonia) Tan Talts	11	19
3	(Denmark) E B. Kæmpegaard (Denmark) M E Rasmussen	21	21

==== Section 4 ====
First round
(Finland) J Kohtala (Finland) S Parikka	21	16	21
(France) T Lefauconnier (France) A Maussion	17	21	7
(Latvia) U Briedis (Latvia) M Kažemaks	21	21
(Czech Republic) M Sokol (Slovakia) A Tekel	12	19
(Norway) J R Andersen (Norway) E Lund	21	21
(Sri Lanka) N Amarasena (Sri Lanka) R Peiris	11	17
(India) S Abbasi (India) U Fadnis	21	21
(Poland) K Gontarski (Poland) R Walas	9	11
(Czech Republic) D Skrčený (Czech Republic) F Stadnik	21	21
(Sweden) M Gustafsson (Sweden) H Nilsson	13	17
(England) P A Mayfield (England) P J. Sunderland	21	21
(Austria) R Bauer (Austria) H Hochgatterer	13	16

Second round
(Finland) J Kohtala (Finland) S Parikka	25	21
(Latvia) U Briedis (Latvia) M Kažemaks	23	18
(Norway) J R Andersen (Norway) E Lund	8	13
8	(Denmark) L Klintrup (Scotland) M Mackay	21	21
(India) S Abbasi (India) U Fadnis	18	21	21
(Czech Republic) D Skrčený (Czech Republic) F Stadnik	21	15	6
(England) P A Mayfield (England) P J. Sunderland	21	21	21
2	(Germany) C Barthel (Germany) A Schulz	23	18	18

Third round
(Finland) J Kohtala (Finland) S Parikka	14	12
8	(Denmark) L Klintrup (Scotland) M Mackay	21	21
(India) S Abbasi (India) U Fadnis	21	18	21
(England) P A Mayfield (England) P J. Sunderland	19	21	15

Quarterfinals
8	(Denmark) L Klintrup (Scotland) M Mackay	22	17	22
(India) S Abbasi (India) U Fadnis	20	21	20

== Women's doubles ==
=== Seeds ===
1. (England) Rebecca Pantaney / Lynne Swan (quarterfinals)
2. (Sri Lanka) Chandrika de Silva / (Germany) Claudia Vogelgsang (bronze medalists)
3. (Russia) Maria Kurochkina / (Romania) Alina Mihaela Popa (third round)
4. (Japan) Nami Fukui / Rie Matsumoto (second round)
5. (Chinese Taipei) Jou Yu-ling / Shü Yuh-ling (third round)
6. (Japan) Yoko Fujita / Mikiko Taniguchi (second round)
7. (India) Swati Tarun Chauhan / Pooja Mehta (third round)
8. (Germany) Petra Schlüter / (Sweden) Pawarisa Wareechol (quarterfinals)

=== Finals ===
Semifinals
(Norway) Helene Abusdal (Sweden) Katja Wengberg	21	18	21
(Germany) Simone Galla (Germany) Annette Grohmann	15	21	15
(Iceland) Erla Björg Hafsteinsdóttir (Iceland) Drífa Harðardóttir	21	21
2	(Sri Lanka) Chandrika de Silva (Germany) Claudia Vogelgsang	9	16

Final
(Norway) Helene Abusdal (Sweden) Katja Wengberg	22	10
(Iceland) Erla Björg Hafsteinsdóttir (Iceland) Drífa Harðardóttir	24	21

=== Top half ===
==== Section 1 ====
First round

Second round
1	(England) R Pantaney (England) L Swan	21	21
(France) G Boussemart (France) M Riaudel	12	14
(Finland) E Heikkinen (Finland) M Ramstedt	24	21
(Germany) T Bischoff (Germany) S Schmidt	22	13
6	(Japan) Y Fujita (Japan) M Taniguchi	21	19
(Norway) H Abusdal (Sweden) K Wengberg	23	21
(Poland) J Herman (Poland) M Koba	21	21
(Sweden) E M Lindqvist (England) S C. Tooke	10	12

Third round
1	(England) R Pantaney (England) L Swan	21	21
(Finland) E Heikkinen (Finland) M Ramstedt	18	10
(Norway) H Abusdal (Sweden) K Wengberg	21	21
(Poland) J Herman (Poland) M Koba	8	10

Quarterfinals
1	(England) R Pantaney (England) L Swan	22	17	20
(Norway) H Abusdal (Sweden) K Wengberg	20	21	22

==== Section 2 ====
First round

Second round
3	(Russia) M Kurochkina (Romania) A M Popa	21	21
(Poland) A Kocimska (Poland) B Wołkowycka	18	16
(Switzerland) O Favre (Switzerland) A Lartchenko Fischer	21	21
(Austria) U Edelmüller (Belgium) N van Hoe	8	10
7	(India) S T Chauhan (India) P Mehta	21	21
(United Arab Emirates) M Bhandari (United Arab Emirates) T M Cherian	15	7
(Germany) S Galla (Germany) A Grohmann	21	21
(Lithuania) A Bačkaitiene (Lithuania) L Januškevičienė	8	8

Third round
3	(Russia) M Kurochkina (Romania) A M Popa	14	21	15
(Switzerland) O Favre (Switzerland) A Lartchenko Fischer	21	13	21
7	(India) S T Chauhan (India) P Mehta	'21	14	17
(Germany) S Galla (Germany) A Grohmann	18	21	21

Quarterfinals
(Switzerland) O Favre (Switzerland) A Lartchenko Fischer	21	17
(Germany) S Galla (Germany) A Grohmann	23	21

=== Bottom half ===
==== Section 3 ====
First round
(Norway) A Olsen (Norway) K Thomt	9	13
(Ukraine) K Kulynych (Ukraine) O Yurchenko	21	21

Second round
(Ukraine) K Kulynych (Ukraine) O Yurchenko	21	21
(France) C Arnaud Luys (France) S Roland	15	10
(Switzerland) M-C Beaudoin Ekstrand (Switzerland) R Trottmann	14	20
8	(Germany) P Schlüter (Sweden) P Wareechol	21	21
(India) D G Ajjikuttira (India) B Baruah	24	13	16
(Poland) U Grządzielska-Zblewska (Poland) J Szleszyńska Łogosz	22	21	21
(Iceland) E B Hafsteinsdóttir (Iceland) D Harðardóttir	21	17	24
4	(Japan) N Fukui (Japan) R Matsumoto	16	21	22

Third round
(Ukraine) K Kulynych (Ukraine) O Yurchenko	21	13	19
8	(Germany) P Schlüter (Sweden) P Wareechol	11	21	21
(Poland) U Grządzielska-Zblewska (Poland) J Szleszyńska Łogosz	7	12
(Iceland) E B Hafsteinsdóttir (Iceland) D Harðardóttir	21	21

Quarterfinals
8	(Germany) P Schlüter (Sweden) P Wareechol	13	5
(Iceland) E B Hafsteinsdóttir (Iceland) D Harðardóttir	21	21

==== Section 4 ====
First round

Second round
(Japan) M Jin (Japan) K Kimura	21	21
(England) S Vine (England) C Wheller	17	7
(Germany) B Recht (Germany) J Willems	13	14
5	(Chinese Taipei) Jou Y-l (Chinese Taipei) Shü Y-l	21	21
(Poland) A Drężek (Poland) M Koziar	4	13
(Finland) M Mikkonen (Finland) S Roivainen	21	21
(India) M S George (India) V Shetty	11	12
2	(Sri Lanka) C de Silva (Germany) C Vogelgsang	21	21

Third round
(Japan) M Jin (Japan) K Kimura	21	24
5	(Chinese Taipei) Jou Y-l (Chinese Taipei) Shü Y-l	18	22
(Finland) M Mikkonen (Finland) S Roivainen	6	16
2	(Sri Lanka) C de Silva (Germany) C Vogelgsang	21	21

Quarterfinals
(Japan) M Jin (Japan) K Kimura	8	10
2	(Sri Lanka) C de Silva (Germany) C Vogelgsang	21	21

== Mixed doubles ==
=== Seeds ===
1. (England) Carl Jennings / Rebecca Pantaney (silver medalists)
2. (Japan) Hosemari Fujimoto / Rie Matsumoto (gold medalists)
3. (Germany) Thorsten Hukriede / Michaela Hukriede (bronze medalists)
4. (Russia) Konstantin Myakishev / Maria Kurochkina (withdrew)
5. (India) Samir Abbasi / Swati Tarun Chauhan (second round)
6. (Denmark) Esben B. Kæmpegaard / Helle Kæmpegaard (first round)
7. (Scotland) Mark Mackay / (Iceland) Erla Björg Hafsteinsdóttir (quarterfinals)
8. (Germany) Björn Wippich / Jessica Willems (first round)

=== Finals ===
Semifinals
1	(England) Carl Jennings (England) Rebecca Pantaney	21	17	21
3	(Germany) Thorsten Hukriede (Germany) Michaela Hukriede	16	21	17
(Japan) Masayuki Matsumoto (Japan) Nami Fukui	13	24
2	(Japan) Hosemari Fujimoto (Japan) Rie Matsumoto	21	26

Final
1	(England) Carl Jennings (England) Rebecca Pantaney	19	21	16
2	(Japan) Hosemari Fujimoto (Japan) Rie Matsumoto	21	13	21

=== Top half ===
==== Section 1 ====
First round
(France) S Coto (France) G Boussemart	22	16	21
(Japan) S Ogawa (Japan) M Taniguchi	20	21	15
(Lithuania) S Stracinskas (Lithuania) A Bačkaitiene	10	15
(Austria) R Bauer (United Arab Emirates) M Bhandari	21	21
(Sweden) C Wiklander (Sweden) P Wareechol	21	21
(Bahrain) J Mottil (Belgium) N van Hoe	11	13
5	(India) S Abbasi (India) S T Chauhan	21	21
(Denmark) H Pøhler (Denmark) M Asmussen	18	18
(Norway) V Næss (Norway) A Olsen	5	13
(Poland) J Dołhan (Poland) M Bieńkowska	21	21
(Germany) A Schulz (Germany) A Grohmann	21	21
(Finland) M Marsela (Finland) M Ramstedt	9	11
(Russia) D Ilin (Russia) M Yakusheva	23	14	15
(Switzerland) J Favre (Switzerland) O Favre	21	21	21

Second round
1	(England) C Jennings (England) R Pantaney	21	21
(France) S Coto (France) G Boussemart	12	11
(Austria) R Bauer (United Arab Emirates) M Bhandari	17	21	21
(Sweden) C Wiklander (Sweden) P Wareechol	21	15	11
5	(India) S Abbasi (India) S T Chauhan	17	18
(Poland) J Dołhan (Poland) M Bieńkowska	21	21
(Germany) A Schulz (Germany) A Grohmann	21	21
(Switzerland) J Favre (Switzerland) O Favre	9	11

Third round
1	(England) C Jennings (England) R Pantaney	21	21
(Austria) R Bauer (United Arab Emirates) M Bhandari	8	11
(Poland) J Dołhan (Poland) M Bieńkowska	17	21	21
(Germany) A Schulz (Germany) A Grohmann	21	14	11

Quarterfinals
1	(England) C Jennings (England) R Pantaney
(Poland) J Dołhan (Poland) M Bieńkowska

==== Section 2 ====
First round
(Poland) K Grebek (Poland) M Średnicka	18	21	17
(Sweden) N Kanebäck (Sweden) E M Srednicka	21	19	21
(Spain) J L Prieto (Spain) Z Martinez	7	8
(England) D Bates (England) M Brothers	21	21
(Estonia) T Vallikivi (Estonia) T Tombak	14	21	14
(Japan) T Minaguchi (Japan) M Jin	21	19	21
6	(Denmark) E B. Kæmpegaard (Denmark) H Kæmpegaard	16	18
(Switzerland) O Colin (Hungary) Gondáné Fórián C	21	21
(Finland) J Atrila (Finland) E Heikkinen	21	21
(France) K-S Blond (France) S Thomas	15	13
(United Arab Emirates) R Ramakrishnan (United Arab Emirates) T M Cherian	9	21	13
(Denmark) K Herløv (Netherlands) M van der Woerdt	21	13	21
(Chinese Taipei) Cheng H-c (Chinese Taipei) Jou Y-l	21	21
(Slovakia) O Milec (Slovakia) M Fekečová	10	9

Second round
3	(Germany) T Hukriede (Germany) M Hukriede	21	21
(Sweden) N Kanebäck (Sweden) E M Srednicka	16	10
(England) D Bates (England) M Brothers	16	3
(Japan) T Minaguchi (Japan) M Jin	21	6^{r}
(Switzerland) O Colin (Hungary) Gondáné Fórián C	21	21
(Finland) J Atrila (Finland) E Heikkinen	16	17
(Denmark) K Herløv (Netherlands) M van der Woerdt	21	21
(Chinese Taipei) Cheng H-c (Chinese Taipei) Jou Y-l	9	16

Third round
3	(Germany) T Hukriede (Germany) M Hukriede	21	21
(England) D Bates (England) M Brothers	16	11
(Switzerland) O Colin (Hungary) Gondáné Fórián C	21	21
(Denmark) K Herløv (Netherlands) M van der Woerdt	19	12

Quarterfinals
3	(Germany) T Hukriede (Germany) M Hukriede	21	21
(Switzerland) O Colin (Hungary) Gondáné Fórián C	9	18

=== Bottom half ===
==== Section 3 ====
First round
(Scotland) R Campbell (Scotland) L Campbell	21	21
(France) N Louis (France) C Arnaud Luys
(India) D Saxena (India) M Deka	21	24
(Slovakia) M Laznik (Slovakia) K Surmíková	15	22
(Bulgaria) M Chavdarov (Romania) A M Popa	19	19
(Austria) H Hochgatterer (Austria) U Edelmüller	21	21
(Japan) M Matsumoto (Japan) N Fukui	21	28
8	(Germany) B Wippich (Germany) J Willems	18	26
(Sweden) A Muth (Sweden) M Kårström	18	21	21
(Finland) S Järvinen (Finland) M Mikkonen	21	15	16
(Norway) J R Andersen (Norway) H Abusdal	21	21
(Poland) S Hetmański (Poland) D Danielak	8	7
(England) P A Mayfield (England) W Taylor	21	21
(Austria) M Grutschnig (Switzerland) R Trottmann	9	4

Second round
(Scotland) R Campbell (Scotland) L Campbell	22	20	15
(India) D Saxena (India) M Deka	20	22	21
(Austria) H Hochgatterer (Austria) U Edelmüller	5^{r}
(Japan) M Matsumoto (Japan) N Fukui	5
(Sweden) A Muth (Sweden) M Kårström	12	12
(Norway) J R Andersen (Norway) H Abusdal	21	21
(England) P A Mayfield (England) W Taylor	w	/	o
4	(Russia) K Myakishev (Russia) M Kurochkina

Third round
(India) D Saxena (India) M Deka	19	16
(Japan) M Matsumoto (Japan) N Fukui	21	21
(Norway) J R Andersen (Norway) H Abusdal	21	21
(England) P A Mayfield (England) W Taylor	14	11

Quarterfinals
(Japan) M Matsumoto (Japan) N Fukui	22	21
(Norway) J R Andersen (Norway) H Abusdal	20	19

==== Section 4 ====
First round
(Poland) M Grzywacz (Poland) D Grzejdak	21	21
(Finland) S Parikka (Finland) U Syrjävaara	16	17
(Switzerland) G Fischer (Switzerland) A Larchenko Fischer	20	21	16
(India) S Velan (India) S Krishnamurthy	22	13	21
(Slovakia) A Tekel (Slovakia) K Tekeľová	17	14
(Denmark) J Hast Hansen (Denmark) J V Nielsen	21	21
(Ukraine) O Obraztsov (Ukraine) K Kulynych	12	9
7	(Scotland) M Mackay (Iceland) E B Hafsteinsdóttir	21	21
(Germany) A Schlüter (Germany) P Schlüter	21	21
(Lithuania) A Kepežinskas (Lithuania) L Januškevičienė	9	10
(Sweden) S Edvardsson (Sweden) K Wengberg	21	21
(England) W Philogene (England) S Vine	14	9
(France) J Krawczyk (France) C Gomes	21	21
(Belgium) J Van den Brande (Belgium) A Lemmens	13	10

Second round
(Poland) M Grzywacz (Poland) D Grzejdak	23	19	21
(India) S Velan (India) S Krishnamurthy	21	21	9
(Denmark) J Hast Hansen (Denmark) J V Nielsen	19	9
7	(Scotland) M Mackay (Iceland) E B Hafsteinsdóttir	21	21
(Germany) A Schlüter (Germany) P Schlüter	21	20	21
(Sweden) S Edvardsson (Sweden) K Wengberg	10	23	21
(France) J Krawczyk (France) C Gomes	15	12
2	(Japan) H Fujimoto (Japan) R Matsumoto	21	21

Third round
(Poland) M Grzywacz (Poland) D Grzejdak	10	12
7	(Scotland) M Mackay (Iceland) E B Hafsteinsdóttir	21	21
(Sweden) S Edvardsson (Sweden) K Wengberg	12	19
2	(Japan) H Fujimoto (Japan) R Matsumoto	21	21

Quarterfinals
7	(Scotland) M Mackay (Iceland) E B Hafsteinsdóttir	13	21	16
2	(Japan) H Fujimoto (Japan) R Matsumoto	21	16	21
