= Zhang Jiewen =

Chinese badminton player (born 1981)

Zhang Jiewen 张洁雯
Personal information
- Born: 4 January 1981 (age 45) Guangzhou, Guangdong, China
- Height: 1.76 m (5 ft 9 in)
- Weight: 70 kg (154 lb)
- Spouse: Choong Tan Fook (m. 2010)

Sport
- Country: China
- Sport: Badminton
- Handedness: Right

Women's & mixed doubles
- Highest ranking: 1 (WD with Yang Wei, October 2003)
- BWF profile
Medal record
Women's badminton
Representing China
Olympic Games
Gold medal – first place	2004 Athens	Women's doubles
World Championships
Gold medal – first place	2005 Anaheim	Women's doubles
Gold medal – first place	2007 Kuala Lumpur	Women's doubles
Silver medal – second place	2001 Seville	Women's doubles
Bronze medal – third place	2006 Madrid	Women's doubles
World Cup
Gold medal – first place	2005 Yiyang	Women's doubles
Silver medal – second place	2006 Yiyang	Women's doubles
Sudirman Cup
Gold medal – first place	2005 Beijing	Mixed team
Gold medal – first place	2007 Glasgow	Mixed team
Silver medal – second place	2003 Eindhoven	Mixed team
Uber Cup
Gold medal – first place	2002 Guangzhou	Women's team
Gold medal – first place	2004 Jakarta	Women's team
Gold medal – first place	2006 Sendai & Tokyo	Women's team
Gold medal – first place	2008 Jakarta	Women's team
Asian Games
Gold medal – first place	2002 Busan	Women's team
Gold medal – first place	2006 Doha	Women's team
Silver medal – second place	2006 Doha	Women's doubles
Bronze medal – third place	2002 Busan	Mixed doubles
Asian Championships
Gold medal – first place	2002 Bangkok	Women's doubles
Gold medal – first place	2008 Johor Bahru	Women's doubles
Bronze medal – third place	2009 Suwon	Women's doubles
World Junior Championships
Gold medal – first place	1998 Melbourne	Girls' doubles
Asian Junior Championships
Gold medal – first place	1999 Yangon	Girls' team
Gold medal – first place	1999 Yangon	Girls' doubles
Bronze medal – third place	1999 Yangon	Mixed doubles

Zhang Jiewen (simplified Chinese: 张洁雯; traditional Chinese: 張潔雯; pinyin: Zhāng Jiéwén; Cantonese Yale: Cheung1 Git3 Man4; born 4 January 1981) is a Chinese former badminton player.

== Career ==
Zhang Jiewen is a Chinese former badminton player who specialized in women's doubles. She won more than thirty international titles, most of them in partnership with Yang Wei, during the first decade of the 21st century. Zhang and Yang were among the world's leading pairs during this period, closely matched with compatriots Gao Ling and Huang Sui. Between them, the two pairs won every BWF World Championships title from 2000 onward; Zhang and Yang defeated Gao and Huang in the finals in 2005 and 2007. Zhang and Yang also won the gold medal at the 2004 Athens Olympics, beating Gao and Huang in a tight final. In contrast, Gao and Huang prevailed in three finals (2003, 2004, 2006) at the All England Open. The tournament was a notable exception in Zhang's career: she reached six women's doubles finals there (four with Yang, and two earlier with Wei Yili) but did not win the title.

In 2008, Zhang helped China secure its sixth consecutive Uber Cup and won the Swiss, Thailand, and Malaysia Open women's doubles titles with Yang. At the Beijing Olympics, top seeds Zhang and Yang were upset in the quarter-finals by Japan's Miyuki Maeda and Satoko Suetsuna. The gold medal was won by younger Chinese pair Du Jing and Yu Yang, signaling a generational shift in Chinese women's doubles.

Zhang retired from competition after the 2008 Olympics. She married former Malaysian badminton player Choong Tan Fook, and the couple have two children. As of 2018, she was coaching at a badminton facility in Guangzhou. Zhang was honored alongside five other retiring teammates during a ceremony at the China Open in Shanghai on 23 November 2008.

== Achievements ==
=== Olympic Games ===
Women's doubles
Year	Venue	Partner	Opponent	Score	Result
2004	Goudi Olympic Hall, Athens, Greece	(China) Yang Wei	(China) Gao Ling (China) Huang Sui	7–15, 15–4, 15–8	Gold

=== World Championships ===
Women's doubles
Year	Venue	Partner	Opponent	Score	Result
2001	Palacio de Deportes de San Pablo, Seville, Spain	(China) Wei Yili	(China) Gao Ling (China) Huang Sui	11–15, 15–17	Silver
2005	Arrowhead Pond, Anaheim, United States	(China) Yang Wei	(China) Gao Ling (China) Huang Sui	17–16, 15–7	Gold
2006	Palacio de Deportes de la Comunidad, Madrid, Spain	(China) Yang Wei	(China) Wei Yili (China) Zhang Yawen	14–21, 19–21	Bronze
2007	Putra Indoor Stadium, Kuala Lumpur, Malaysia	(China) Yang Wei	(China) Gao Ling (China) Huang Sui	21–16, 21–19	Gold

=== World Cup ===
Women's doubles
Year	Venue	Partner	Opponent	Score	Result
2005	Olympic Park, Yiyang, China	(China) Yang Wei	(China) Wei Yili (China) Zhang Yawen	21–18, 21–15	Gold
2006	Olympic Park, Yiyang, China	(China) Yang Wei	(China) Gao Ling (China) Huang Sui	19–21, 6–21	Silver

=== Asian Games ===
Women's doubles
Year	Venue	Partner	Opponent	Score	Result
2006	Aspire Hall 3, Doha, Qatar	(China) Yang Wei	(China) Gao Ling (China) Huang Sui	21–18, 21–23, 14–21	Silver

Mixed doubles
Year	Venue	Partner	Opponent	Score	Result
2002	Gangseo Gymnasium, Busan, South Korea	(China) Chen Qiqiu	(South Korea) Kim Dong-moon (South Korea) Ra Kyung-min	6–11, 0–11	Bronze

=== Asian Championships ===
Women's doubles
Year	Venue	Partner	Opponent	Score	Result
2002	Nimibutr Stadium, Bangkok, Thailand	(China) Yang Wei	(China) Gao Ling (China) Huang Sui	11–8, 11–6	Gold
2008	Bandaraya Stadium, Johor Bahru, Malaysia	(China) Yang Wei	(Chinese Taipei) Cheng Wen-hsing (Chinese Taipei) Chien Yu-chin	22–20, 21–16	Gold
2009	Suwon Indoor Stadium, Suwon, South Korea	(China) Yang Wei	(China) Ma Jin (China) Wang Xiaoli	16–21, 20–22	Bronze

=== World Junior Championships ===
Girls' doubles
Year	Venue	Partner	Opponent	Score	Result
1998	Sports and Aquatic Centre; Melbourne, Australia	(China) Xie Xingfang	(China) Huang Sui (China) Gong Ruina	3–15, 15–13, 15–10	Gold

=== Asian Junior Championships ===
Girls' doubles
Year	Venue	Partner	Opponent	Score	Result
1999	National Indoor Stadium – 1, Yangon, Myanmar	(China) Xie Xingfang	(China) Li Yujia (China) Wei Yili	15–9, 15–6	Gold

Mixed doubles
Year	Venue	Partner	Opponent	Score	Result
1999	National Indoor Stadium – 1, Yangon, Myanmar	(China) Xie Zhongbo	(Indonesia) Hendri Kurniawan Saputra (Indonesia) Enny Erlangga	14–17, 12–15	Bronze

=== BWF Superseries (4 titles, 3 runners-up) ===
The BWF Superseries, which was launched on 14 December 2006 and implemented in 2007, is a series of elite badminton tournaments, sanctioned by the Badminton World Federation (BWF). BWF Superseries levels are Superseries and Superseries Premier. A season of Superseries consists of twelve tournaments around the world that have been introduced since 2011. Successful players are invited to the Superseries Finals, which are held at the end of each year.

Women's doubles
Year	Tournament	Partner	Opponent	Score	Result
2007	Korea Open	(China) Yang Wei	(China) Gao Ling (China) Huang Sui	21–12, 14–21, 16–21	(silver) Runner-up
2007	All England Open	(China) Yang Wei	(China) Wei Yili (China) Zhang Yawen	16–21, 21–8, 22–24	(silver) Runner-up
2007	Japan Open	(China) Yang Wei	(China) Yu Yang (China) Zhao Tingting	21–17, 21–5	(gold) Winner
2007	Denmark Open	(China) Yang Wei	(South Korea) Lee Hyo-jung (South Korea) Lee Kyung-won	12–21, 21–19, 21–19	(gold) Winner
2008	Malaysia Open	(China) Yang Wei	(China) Gao Ling (China) Zhao Tingting	21–13, 16–21, 24–22	(gold) Winner
2008	Swiss Open	(China) Yang Wei	(China) Wei Yili (China) Zhang Yawen	21–18, 22–24, 21–8	(gold) Winner
2009	Malaysia Open	(China) Yang Wei	(South Korea) Lee Hyo-jung (South Korea) Lee Kyung-won	15–21, 12–21	(silver) Runner-up

BWF Super Series Finals tournament
BWF Super Series Premier tournament
BWF Super Series tournament

=== BWF Grand Prix (25 titles, 14 runners-up) ===
The BWF Grand Prix had two levels, the BWF Grand Prix and Grand Prix Gold. It was a series of badminton tournaments sanctioned by the Badminton World Federation (BWF) which was held from 2007 to 2017. The World Badminton Grand Prix has been sanctioned by the International Badminton Federation from 1983 to 2006.

Women's doubles
Year	Tournament	Partner	Opponent	Score	Result
2000	Denmark Open	(China) Wei Yili	(China) Chen Lin (China) Jiang Xuelian	7–15, 3–15	(silver) Runner-up
2001	All England Open	(China) Wei Yili	(China) Gao Ling (China) Huang Sui	15–10, 8–15, 9–15	(silver) Runner-up
2001	Singapore Open	(China) Wei Yili	(China) Zhang Yawen (China) Zhao Tingting	8–6, 7–3, 7–4	(gold) Winner
2001	China Open	(China) Wei Yili	(China) Huang Nanyan (China) Yang Wei	8–6, 7–3, 6–8, 8–7	(gold) Winner
2003	All England Open	(China) Yang Wei	(China) Gao Ling (China) Huang Sui	9–11, 7–11	(silver) Runner-up
2003	Swiss Open	(China) Yang Wei	(China) Wei Yili (China) Zhao Tingting	11–7, 6–11, 11–4	(gold) Winner
2003	Singapore Open	(China) Yang Wei	(China) Gao Ling (China) Huang Sui	17–16, 15–7	(gold) Winner
2003	Indonesia Open	(China) Yang Wei	(China) Gao Ling (China) Huang Sui	Walkover	(silver) Runner-up
2003	Malaysia Open	(China) Yang Wei	(China) Gao Ling (China) Huang Sui	15–5, 1–15, 17–15	(gold) Winner
2003	Denmark Open	(China) Yang Wei	(China) Zhang Dan (China) Zhang Yawen	15–2, 15–1	(gold) Winner
2003	German Open	(China) Yang Wei	(South Korea) Lee Kyung-won (South Korea) Ra Kyung-min	6–15, 17–15, 8–15	(silver) Runner-up
2003	Hong Kong Open	(China) Yang Wei	(China) Gao Ling (China) Huang Sui	14–17, 5–15	(silver) Runner-up
2003	China Open	(China) Yang Wei	(China) Gao Ling (China) Huang Sui	8–15, 12–15	(silver) Runner-up
2004	Swiss Open	(China) Yang Wei	(China) Gao Ling (China) Huang Sui	Walkover	(silver) Runner-up
2004	All England Open	(China) Yang Wei	(China) Gao Ling (China) Huang Sui	Walkover	(silver) Runner-up
2004	Korea Open	(China) Yang Wei	(South Korea) Lee Kyung-won (South Korea) Ra Kyung-min	15–8, 9–15, 15–6	(gold) Winner
2004	Malaysia Open	(China) Yang Wei	(China) Gao Ling (China) Huang Sui	15–7, 15–6	(gold) Winner
2004	China Open	(China) Yang Wei	(China) Wei Yili (China) Zhao Tingting	15–14, 15–12	(gold) Winner
2004	Singapore Open	(China) Yang Wei	(Thailand) Sathinee Chankrachangwong (Thailand) Saralee Thungthongkam	15–5, 9–15, 15–11	(gold) Winner
2004	Indonesia Open	(China) Yang Wei	(China) Zhang Dan (China) Zhang Yawen	15–10, 15–5	(gold) Winner
2005	Japan Open	(China) Yang Wei	(China) Wei Yili (China) Zhao Tingting	15–12, 15–2	(gold) Winner
2005	Malaysia Open	(China) Yang Wei	(China) Gao Ling (China) Huang Sui	15–6, 15–8	(gold) Winner
2005	Hong Kong Open	(China) Yang Wei	(China) Gao Ling (China) Huang Sui	15–13, 8–15, 15–6	(gold) Winner
2005	China Open	(China) Yang Wei	(China) Gao Ling (China) Huang Sui	15–10, 15–4	(gold) Winner
2006	German Open	(China) Yang Wei	(China) Gao Ling (China) Huang Sui	3–15, 15–11, 15–10	(gold) Winner
2006	All England Open	(China) Yang Wei	(China) Gao Ling (China) Huang Sui	15–6, 11–15, 2–15	(silver) Runner-up
2006	Indonesia Open	(China) Yang Wei	(China) Wei Yili (China) Zhang Yawen	13–21, 13–21	(silver) Runner-up
2006	Singapore Open	(China) Yang Wei	(China) Zhang Dan (China) Zhao Tingting	21–18, 21–18	(gold) Winner
2006	Korea Open	(China) Yang Wei	(Indonesia) Jo Novita (Indonesia) Greysia Polii	21–10, 21–11	(gold) Winner
2006	Hong Kong Open	(China) Yang Wei	(China) Gao Ling (China) Huang Sui	21–19, 15–21, 21–19	(gold) Winner
2006	China Open	(China) Yang Wei	(China) Wei Yili (China) Zhang Yawen	21–17, 21–7	(gold) Winner
2007	German Open	(China) Yang Wei	(China) Du Jing (China) Yu Yang	21–8, 21–7	(gold) Winner
2007	Bitburger Open	(China) Yang Wei	(England) Natalie Munt (England) Joanne Nicholas	21–11, 21–10	(gold) Winner
2008	Thailand Open	(China) Yang Wei	(Malaysia) Chin Eei Hui (Malaysia) Wong Pei Tty	15–21, 21–13, 21–13	(gold) Winner
2009	Thailand Open	(China) Yang Wei	(China) Gao Ling (China) Wei Yili	22–24, 21–17, 21–15	(gold) Winner
2009	Macau Open	(China) Yang Wei	(China) Du Jing (China) Yu Yang	16–21, 11–21	(silver) Runner-up
2009	Chinese Taipei Open	(China) Yang Wei	(Indonesia) Vita Marissa (United States) Mona Santoso	21–14, 21–9	(gold) Winner

Mixed doubles
Year	Tournament	Partner	Opponent	Score	Result
2001	Malaysia Open	(China) Liu Yong	(Indonesia) Bambang Suprianto (Indonesia) Emma Ermawati	8–7, 8–6, 2–7, 2–7, 2–7	(silver) Runner-up
2003	Singapore Open	(China) Zheng Bo	(South Korea) Kim Dong-moon (South Korea) Ra Kyung-min	5–15, 9–15	(silver) Runner-up

BWF Grand Prix Gold tournament
BWF Grand Prix tournament

=== IBF International (1 runners-up) ===
Women's doubles
Year	Tournament	Partner	Opponent	Score	Result
2002	French International	(China) Wei Yili	(China) Zhang Yawen (China) Zhao Tingting	7–1, 7–2, 5–7, 5–7, 2–7	(silver) Runner-up
