= Chen Lin (badminton) =

Chinese badminton player (born 1977)

Chen Lin 陈林
Personal information
- Born: 7 March 1977 (age 49) Zhuzhou, Hunan, China
- Height: 1.64 m (5 ft 5 in)
- Weight: 55 kg (121 lb)
- Spouse: Chen Qiqiu (m. 2006)

Sport
- Country: China
- Sport: Badminton
- Handedness: Right
- Event: Women's and Mixed doubles

Women's and Mixed doubles
- BWF profile
Medal record
Women's badminton
Representing China
World Championships
Bronze medal – third place	2001 Seville	Women's doubles

Chen Lin (Chinese: 陈林, born March 7, 1977) is a former female Chinese badminton player. She starts her career in badminton in her own province - Anhua County Badminton School in 1986 until made it into the first national team in 1999.

She was a solid choice for China during late 90's and early 2000 in women's doubles with Jiang Xuelian, winning several high-profile tournaments such as Denmark Open, Hong Kong Open and German Open. She won the bronze medal at the 2001 Badminton World Championships in the women's doubles together with Jiang. Besides women's doubles, Chen Lin is also an established mixed doubles player, winning Dutch Open twice with Chen Qiqiu and also China Open with Liu Yong.

After several downturns of performance in 2003, Chen called it quit in 2004 and continuing her study in administrative management at Jinan University in Guangzhou.

== Personal life ==
During the SARS epidemic in 2003, Chen composed a song dedicated to the medical staff on the front line fighting against SARS. This instance charmed one of her mixed doubles partner, Chen Qiqiu and they instantly dating. They got married in 2006 and had one child named Chen Yinxuan.

== Achievements ==
=== IBF World Championships ===
Women's doubles
Year	Venue	Partner	Opponent	Score	Result
2001	Palacio de Deportes de San Pablo; Seville, Spain	(China) Jiang Xuelian	(China) Gao Ling (China) Huang Sui	Walkover	Bronze

=== IBF Grand Prix ===
The World Badminton Grand Prix was sanctioned by the International Badminton Federation since 1983.

Women's doubles
Year	Tournament	Partner	Opponent	Score	Result
1998	Hong Kong Open	(China) Jiang Xuelian	(China) Qian Hong (China) Liu Lu	15–4, 15–11	(gold) Winner
1999	Dutch Open	(China) Jiang Xuelian	(China) Tang Chunyu (China) Zhou Mi	15–9, 15–4	(gold) Winner
1999	German Open	(China) Jiang Xuelian	(China) Gao Ling (China) Qin Yiyuan	15–13, 15–13	(gold) Winner
1999	Denmark Open	(China) Jiang Xuelian	(China) Gao Ling (China) Qin Yiyuan	12–15, 8–15	(silver) Runner-up
1999	Hong Kong Open	(China) Jiang Xuelian	(China) Huang Sui (China) Lu Ying	15–17, 15–12, 15–8	(gold) Winner
2000	Dutch Open	(China) Jiang Xuelian	(Denmark) Helene Kirkegaard (Denmark) Rikke Olsen	6–15, 7–15	(silver) Runner-up
2000	Denmark Open	(China) Jiang Xuelian	(China) Zhang Jiewen (China) Wei Yili	15–7, 15–3	(gold) Winner
2000	Grand Prix Finals	(China) Jiang Xuelian	(China) Huang Nanyan (China) Yang Wei	6–8, 3–7, 7–3, 3–7	(silver) Runner-up
2002	Korea Open	(China) Jiang Xuelian	(China) Gao Ling (China) Huang Sui	2–7, 3–7, 7–5, 3–7	(silver) Runner-up

Mixed doubles
Year	Tournament	Partner	Opponent	Score	Result
1999	Dutch Open	(China) Chen Qiqiu	(Denmark) Martin Lundgaard Hansen (Denmark) Pernille Harder	15–11, 9–15, 15–10	(gold) Winner
1999	Hong Kong Open	(China) Guo Siwei	(Malaysia) Chan Chong Ming (Malaysia) Joanne Quay	11–15, 8–15	(silver) Runner-up
2000	Dutch Open	(China) Chen Qiqiu	(England) Simon Archer (Netherlands) Erica Van Den Heuvel	8–15, 15–12, 15–10	(gold) Winner
2001	China Open	(China) Liu Yong	(Denmark) Michael Søgaard (Denmark) Rikke Olsen	4–7, 8–7, 8–7, 7–5	(gold) Winner

BWF & IBF Grand Prix tournament
IBF Grand Prix Finals tournament

=== IBF International ===
Mixed doubles
Year	Tournament	Partner	Opponent	Score	Result
2000	Polish Open	(China) Chen Qiqiu	(Ukraine) Vladislav Druzchenko (Ukraine) Victoria Evtoushenko	15–7, 15–8	(gold) Winner
