= Wang Wenjiao =

Indonesian-born Chinese badminton player and coach (1933–2022)

Wang Wenjiao 王文教
- Wang in 2019

Member of the Chinese People's Political Consultative Conference
- In office March 1978 – March 1988

Personal details
- Born: Ong Boen Kao; 22 November 1933 Surakarta, Dutch East Indies
- Died: 25 December 2022 (aged 89) Beijing, China

Wang Wenjiao (Chinese: 王文教; 22 November 1933 – 25 December 2022) was an Indonesian-born Chinese badminton player and coach known as the "Godfather" of Chinese badminton. After winning a number of national championships in the 1950s, he served for 21 years as head coach of the China national men's badminton team, which under his leadership won 56 individual world titles as well as four Thomas Cups (1982, 1986, 1988, and 1990). He was conferred the Lifetime Achievement Award by the Badminton World Federation in 2014, and became the first sportsperson to receive the national title of "People's Role Model" in 2019.

== Early life and playing career ==
Wang was born in 1933 in Surakarta (Solo), Dutch East Indies (now Indonesia), to an ethnic Chinese family with ancestral roots in Nan'an, Fujian. He played badminton from childhood, and became a star player in Indonesia by the 1950s.

In 1953, Wang visited the newly established People's Republic of China (PRC) as a member of Chinese-Indonesian sports delegation. He later recalled that China's standard of badminton was so low that he was able to defeat the national champion 15–0. After the trip, Wang and his friend Chen Fushou decided to move to China in 1954 to develop the sport in their ancestral country. The duo helped establish the Fujian provincial badminton team, the first badminton team in the PRC, in December 1956. More than 20 other provinces subsequently established badminton teams because of Wang's efforts. Wang and Chen also wrote the first badminton textbook in China, which was published in 1957. During the 1st National Games of China in 1959, they won the men's doubles gold medal. He won a number of other national championships between 1956 and 1959, but retired as a player in the 1960s owing to injury.

== Coaching career ==
After retirement from playing, Wang focused on coaching and was appointed the head coach of the China national badminton team in 1972. His early trainees included Tang Xianhu, Hou Jiachang, and Fang Kaixiang, who were highly successful in Asian tournaments and friendly matches against European players, but were unable to participate in international tournaments as the PRC was not affiliated with the International Badminton Federation (IBF) at the time.

Once China joined the IBF in the early 1980s, Wang immediately coached the Chinese men's team to win their first Thomas Cup in 1982. He later recalled the championship as one of the most unforgettable moments in his career, during which China trailed Indonesia 1-3 after the first day, but came back from behind to win the cup 5-4 on the second day.

In his 21-year-long tenure as head coach, Wang trained many world champions, including Han Jian, Yang Yang, Zhao Jianhua, Xiong Guobao, Li Yongbo, and Tian Bingyi, who altogether won 56 world titles. The Chinese men's team won the Thomas Cup three more times, in 1986, 1988, and 1990, as well as five other world team championships. He retired in 1993.

He was a member of the 5th and 6th Chinese People's Political Consultative Conference and served from 1978 till 1988.

== Personal life and death ==
Wang died on 25 December 2022, at the age of 89, from COVID-19.

== Honours and recognition ==
Wang has been called the "Godfather" of Chinese badminton. For his contributions to the sport, the Badminton World Federation honoured him with the Lifetime Achievement Award in 2014. During 70th anniversary of the People's Republic of China celebrations in September 2019, CCP general secretary Xi Jinping awarded him the national title of "People's Role Model". He was the first sportsperson to receive the honour.
