= Jiang Xuelian =

Chinese badminton player

Jiang Xuelian 蒋雪莲
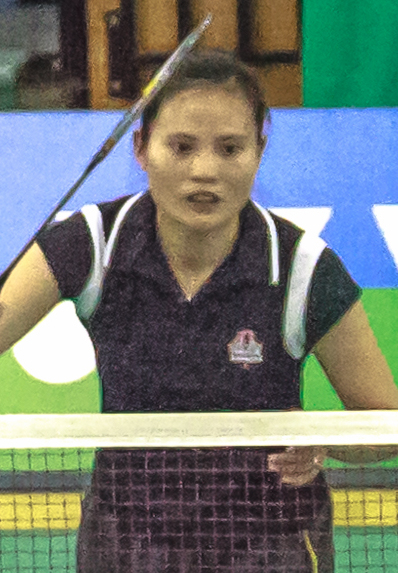
- Jiang in 2009

Personal information
- Born: 1 May 1979 (age 47) Chongqing, China
- Height: 1.63 m (5 ft 4 in)

Sport
- Country: China (1995–2003); Canada (2009–2010)
- Sport: Badminton
- Handedness: Right
- Event: Women's & mixed doubles
Medal record
Women's badminton
Representing China
World Championships
Bronze medal – third place	2001 Seville	Women's doubles

Jiang Xuelian (Chinese: 蒋雪莲, born 1 May 1979) is a former Chinese badminton player, who later represented Canada. Jiang was joined the Chongqing badminton team in 1993. In 1997, she entered the Sichuan Institute of Sports & Technology, and at the same year she was selected to join the national team. In 2001, she competed at the IBF World Championships in Seville, Spain, and won the women's doubles bronze with Chen Lin. She was retired from the national team in 2004, and in 2009, she started to represent Canada.

Jiang at the 2009 U.S. Open mixed doubles final

== Achievements ==
=== IBF World Championships ===
Women's doubles
Year	Venue	Partner	Opponent	Score	Result
2001	Palacio de Deportes de San Pablo; Seville, Spain	(China) Chen Lin	(China) Gao Ling (China) Huang Sui	Walkover	Bronze

=== BWF Grand Prix ===
The BWF Grand Prix has two level such as Grand Prix and Grand Prix Gold. It is a series of badminton tournaments, sanctioned by Badminton World Federation (BWF) since 2007. The World Badminton Grand Prix sanctioned by International Badminton Federation since 1983.

Women's doubles
Year	Tournament	Partner	Opponent	Score	Result
2009	U.S. Open	(Canada) Huang Ruilin	(United States) Chen Ying (United States) Peng Yun	14–21, 21–15, 21–11	(gold) Winner
2002	Korea Open	(China) Chen Lin	(China) Gao Ling (China) Huang Sui	2–7, 3–7, 7–5, 3–7	(silver) Runner-up
2000	Grand Prix Finals	(China) Chen Lin	(China) Huang Nanyan (China) Yang Wei	6–8, 3–7, 7–3, 3–7	(silver) Runner-up
2000	Denmark Open	(China) Chen Lin	(China) Zhang Jiewen (China) Wei Yili	15–7, 15–3	(gold) Winner
2000	Dutch Open	(China) Chen Lin	(Denmark) Helene Kirkegaard (Denmark) Rikke Olsen	6–15, 7–15	(silver) Runner-up
1999	Hong Kong Open	(China) Chen Lin	(China) Huang Sui (China) Lu Ying	15–17, 15–12, 15–8	(gold) Winner
1999	Denmark Open	(China) Chen Lin	(China) Gao Ling (China) Qin Yiyuan	12–15, 8–15	(silver) Runner-up
1999	German Open	(China) Chen Lin	(China) Gao Ling (China) Qin Yiyuan	15–13, 15–13	(gold) Winner
1999	Dutch Open	(China) Chen Lin	(China) Tang Chunyu (China) Zhou Mi	15–9, 15–4	(gold) Winner
1998	Hong Kong Open	(China) Chen Lin	(China) Qian Hong (China) Liu Lu	15–4, 15–11	(gold) Winner

Mixed doubles
Year	Tournament	Partner	Opponent	Score	Result
2009	U.S. Open	(Canada) Alvin Lau	(United States) Howard Bach (United States) Eva Lee	13–21, 12–21	(silver) Runner-up

BWF Grand Prix Gold tournament
BWF & IBF Grand Prix tournament
IBF Grand Prix Finals tournament

=== BWF International Challenge/Series ===
Mixed doubles
Year	Tournament	Partner	Opponent	Score	Result
2010	Canadian International	(Canada) Derrick Ng	(Canada) Toby Ng (Canada) Grace Gao	23–21, 18–21, 24–26	(silver) Runner-up

BWF International Challenge tournament
BWF International Series tournament
