= Zhang Dan (badminton) =

Chinese badminton player (born 1982)

Zhang Dan 張丹
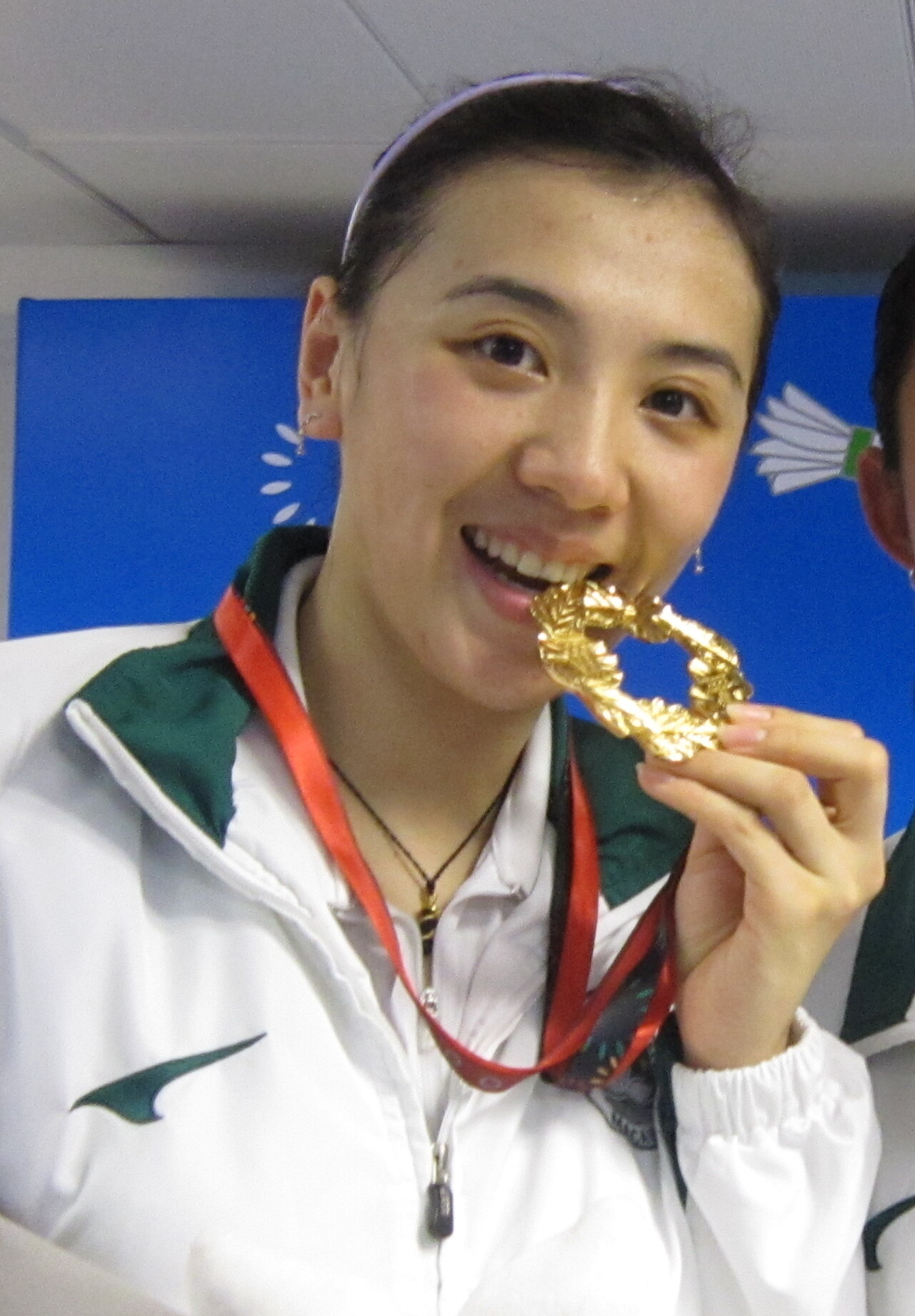
- Zhang with her 2009 East Asian Games gold medal

Personal information
- Born: 16 January 1982 (age 44) China
- Height: 1.67 m (5 ft 6 in)

Sport
- Country: China; Macau
- Sport: Badminton
- Handedness: Right

Women's & mixed doubles
- Highest ranking: 23 (5 August 2010)
- BWF profile
Medal record
Women's badminton
Representing China
World Championships
Bronze medal – third place	2005 Anaheim	Women's doubles
World Cup
Bronze medal – third place	2005 Yiyang	Women's doubles
Summer Universiade
Silver medal – second place	2007 Bangkok	Mixed team
Bronze medal – third place	2007 Bangkok	Women's doubles
Bronze medal – third place	2007 Bangkok	Mixed doubles
Representing Macau
East Asian Games
Gold medal – first place	2009 Hong Kong	Women's doubles

Zhang Dan (Chinese: 張丹; pinyin: Zhāng Dān; born 16 January 1982) is a Chinese badminton player and in 2008 she started representing Macau.

== Career ==
Zhang was specialized in women's doubles and mixed doubles, earning numerous international titles in both events.

At the 2005 World Championships tournament she took a bronze in women's doubles with Zhang Yawen. At the 2007 Summer Universiade she took a silver medal with the Chinese mixed team and two individual bronze medals in women's doubles with Wang Lin and in mixed doubles with Chen Hong.

She reached nine finals at Grand Prix events in women's doubles between 2003 and 2006, winning three events with Zhang Yawen, the 2004 Thailand Open & German Open and the 2005 Singapore Open.

In 2007, she became the women's doubles semifinalist of the Korea International Challenge tournament partnered with Zhang Zhibo.

In 2008, she became the women's doubles runner-up of the China Masters tournament partnered with Zhang Zhibo. They were defeated by Cheng Shu and Zhao Yunlei of China in straight games 14–21, 11–21.

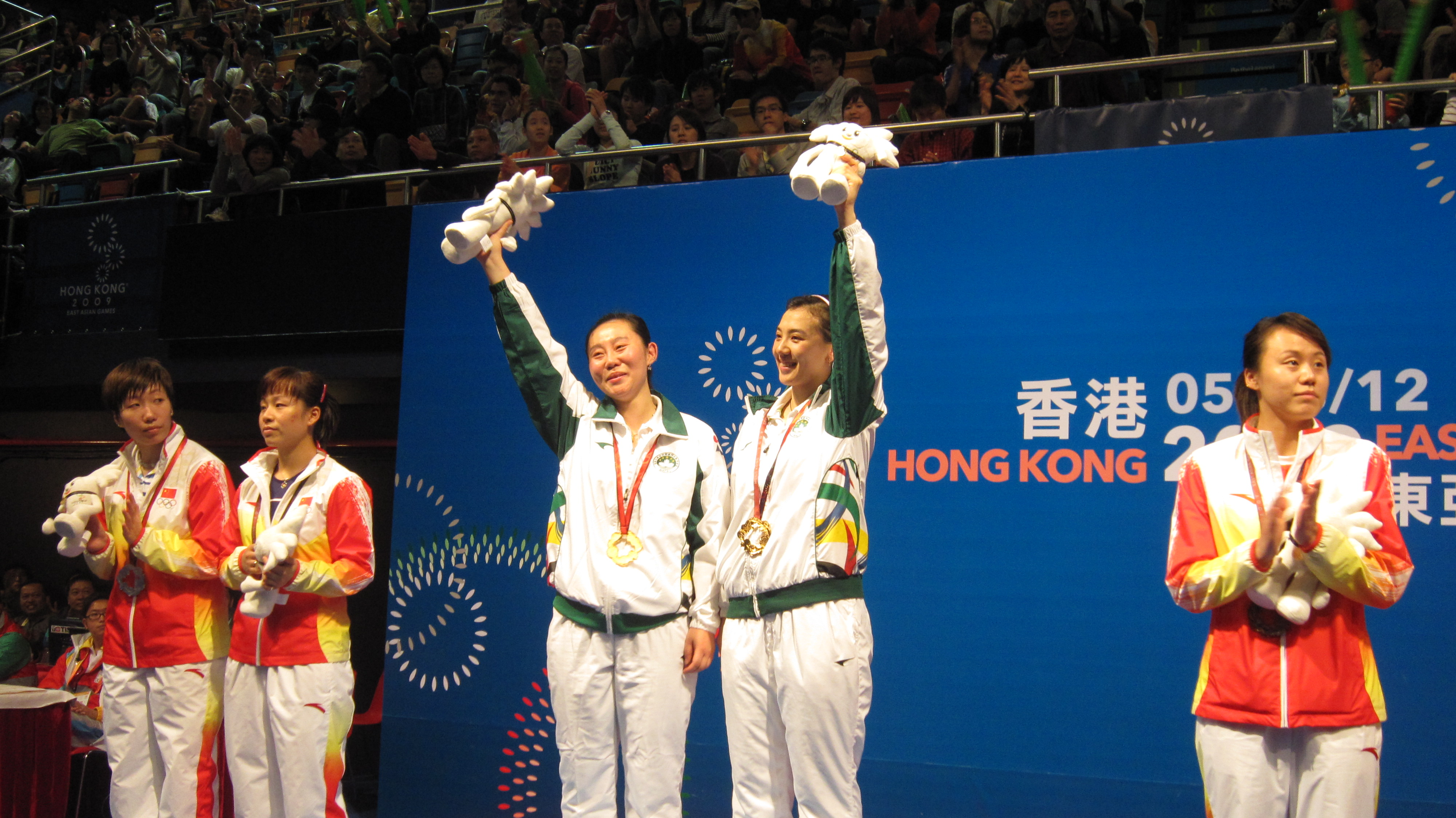
Zhang (second from right) won the women's doubles gold medal at the 2009 Hong Kong East Asian Games

In 2009, she and partner Zhang Zhibo won the gold medal for Macau at the East Asian Games in the women's doubles event after they beat the top seeds from China, Ma Jin and Wang Xiaoli with the score 22–20, 21–16. She also became the women's doubles semifinalist of the Macau and Denmark Open tournaments. At Macau, she and her partner Zhang Zhibo were defeated by the 2008 Olympic Games gold medalist Du Jing and Yu Yang with the score 10–21, 17–21; and at Denmark, they were defeated by Pan Pan and Zhang Yawen of China.

In 2010, she qualified to represent Macau at the Asian Games. However, in accordance with the competition rules, players must be three years after they last competed for their country of origin before they will be able to represent the country, so her entry qualification was canceled; the Macau team also decided to withdraw from the competition. Not long after Zhang Dan retired from playing on international level.

== Achievements ==
=== BWF World Championships ===
Women's doubles
Year	Venue	Partner	Opponent	Score	Result
2005	Arrowhead Pond, Anaheim, United States	(China) Zhang Yawen	(China) Gao Ling (China) Huang Sui	5–15, 8–15	Bronze

=== World Cup ===
Women's doubles
Year	Venue	Partner	Opponent	Score	Result
2005	Olympic Park, Yiyang, China	(China) Zhao Tingting	(China) Yang Wei (China) Zhang Jiewen	21–15, 9–21, 10–21	Bronze

=== Summer Universiade ===
Women's doubles
Year	Venue	Partner	Opponent	Score	Result
2007	Thammasat University, Pathum Thani, Thailand	(China) Wang Lin	(Chinese Taipei) Cheng Wen-hsing (Chinese Taipei) Chien Yu-chin	19–21, 12–21	Bronze

Mixed doubles
Year	Venue	Partner	Opponent	Score	Result
2007	Thammasat University, Pathum Thani, Thailand	(China) Chen Hong	(South Korea) Yoo Yeon-seong (South Korea) Kim Min-jung	14–21, 21–23	Bronze

=== East Asian Games ===
Women's doubles
Year	Venue	Partner	Opponent	Score	Result
2009	Queen Elizabeth Stadium, Hong Kong	(Macau) Zhang Zhibo	(China) Ma Jin (China) Wang Xiaoli	22–20, 21–16	Gold

=== BWF Superseries ===
The BWF Superseries, launched on 14 December 2006 and implemented in 2007, is a series of elite badminton tournaments, sanctioned by the Badminton World Federation (BWF). BWF Superseries has two level such as Superseries and Superseries Premier. A season of Superseries features twelve tournaments around the world, which introduced since 2011, with successful players invited to the Superseries Finals held at the year end.

Women's doubles
Year	Tournament	Partner	Opponent	Score	Result
2008	China Masters	(Macau) Zhang Zhibo	(China) Cheng Shu (China) Zhao Yunlei	14–21, 11–21	(silver) Runner-up

=== IBF Grand Prix ===
The World Badminton Grand Prix was sanctioned by the International Badminton Federation from 1983 to 2006.

Women's doubles
Year	Tournament	Partner	Opponent	Score	Result
2003	Denmark Open	(China) Zhang Yawen	(China) Yang Wei (China) Zhang Jiewen	2–15, 1–15	(silver) Runner-up
2004	Thailand Open	(China) Zhang Yawen	(China) Du Jing (China) Yu Yang	15–5, 15–7	(gold) Winner
2004	Denmark Open	(China) Zhang Yawen	(China) Wei Yili (China) Zhao Tingting	13–15, 15–12, 7–15	(silver) Runner-up
2004	German Open	(China) Zhang Yawen	(China) Wei Yili (China) Zhao Tingting	15–8, 15–12	(gold) Winner
2004	Indonesia Open	(China) Zhang Yawen	(China) Yang Wei (China) Zhang Jiewen	10–15, 5–15	(silver) Runner-up
2005	Thailand Open	(China) Zhang Yawen	(South Korea) Lee Hyo-jung (South Korea) Lee Kyung-won	15–9, 11–15, 13–15	(silver) Runner-up
2005	Singapore Open	(China) Zhang Yawen	(China) Gao Ling (China) Huang Sui	15–13, 15–10	(gold) Winner
2006	Swiss Open	(China) Zhao Tingting	(China) Du Jing (China) Yu Yang	5–15, 15–10, 11–15	(silver) Runner-up
2006	Singapore Open	(China) Zhao Tingting	(China) Yang Wei (China) Zhang Jiewen	18–21, 18–21	(silver) Runner-up
