= Elena Nozdran =

Ukrainian badminton player

Personal information
- Born: Олена Іванівна Ноздрань (Olena Ivanovna Nozdran Olena); July 20, 1975 (age 51) Dnipro, Ukrainian SSR, Soviet Union (now Ukraine)
- Height: 168 cm (5 ft 6 in)

Sport
- Country: Ukraine (until 2006); Luxembourg (2006–present)
- Sport: Badminton
- Handedness: Right

Women's singles and doubles
- Career record: 344 wins, 175 losses
- BWF profile
Medal record
Women's badminton
Representing Luxembourg
World Senior Championships
Bronze medal – third place	2019 Katowice	Women's singles 40+

Elena Ivanivna Nozdran (Ukrainian: Олена Іванівна Ноздрань; born 20 July 1975) is a Ukrainian-born badminton player who has represented both Ukraine and Luxembourg. She played at the 2005 World Badminton Championships in Anaheim, California.

In the women's singles event she reached the second round before losing to Pi Hongyan of France. Nozdran also played in the German leagues before moving to Luxembourg and working as a badminton coach. In Luxembourg, she returned to the court as a player again and won the women's doubles national championships in 2011, 2013, 2014, and 2017; and also in the mixed doubles in 2011 and 2017.

== Achievements ==
=== World Senior Championships ===
Women’s singles

Year	Venue	Event	Opponent	Score	Result
2019	Spodek, Katowice, Poland	Women's singles 40+	(Germany) Claudia Vogelgsang	21–18, 10–21, 25–27	Bronze

=== IBF World Grand Prix ===
The World Badminton Grand Prix has been sanctioned by the International Badminton Federation since 1983.

Women’s singles
Year	Event	Opponent	Score	Result
1995	Bulgarian Open	(Belarus) Vlada Chernyavskaya	11–8, 11–2	(gold) Winner
1999	Polish Open	(Hong Kong) Ling Wan Ting	11–9, 13–11	(gold) Winner
2000	Polish Open	(Japan) Takako Ida	8–11, 3–11	(silver) Runner-up
2001	German Open	(France) Pi Hongyan	1–7, 5–7, 2–7	(silver) Runner-up

Women's doubles
Year	Tournament	Partner	Opponent	Score	Result
1994	Russian Open	(Ukraine) Victoria Evtoushenko	(Russia) Svetlana Alferova (Russia) Marina Yakusheva	1–15, 7–15	(silver) Runner-up
1999	Polish Open	(Ukraine) Victoria Evtoushenko	(Malaysia) Ang Li Peng (Malaysia) Chor Hooi Yee	15–2, 13–15, 10–15	(silver) Runner-up

=== BWF/IBF International Challenge/Series ===
Women's singles
Year	Tournament	Opponent	Score	Result
1993	Slovenian International	(Hungary) Andrea Harsági	11–7, 10–12, 8–11	(silver) Runner-up
1993	Romanian International			(gold) Winner
1994	Slovak International	(Russia) Elena Denisova	11–6, 11–5	(gold) Winner
1994	Hungarian International	(Denmark) Anne Søndergaard	10–12, 3–11	(silver) Runner-up
1995	Slovak International	(Ukraine) Natalja Esipenko	11–4, 11–2	(gold) Winner
1997	Hungarian International	(Netherlands) Lonneke Janssen	9–5, 9–2, 9–5	(gold) Winner
1997	Le Volant d'Or de Toulouse	(Ukraine) Natalia Golovkina	11–3, 11–3	(gold) Winner
1998	Le Volant d'Or de Toulouse	(England) Joanne Muggeridge	11–9, 11–2	(gold) Winner
1999	La Chaux-de-Fonds International	(Sweden) Johanna Holgersson	11–8, 11–1	(gold) Winner
1999	Bulgarian International	(Finland) Anu Weckström	11–6, 11–8	(gold) Winner
1999	Le Volant d'Or de Toulouse	(Sweden) Marina Andrievskaya	4–11, 9–11	(silver) Runner-up
2000	Portugal International	(Poland) Katarzyna Krasowska	11–1, 11–4	(gold) Winner
2000	Russian International	(Russia) Ella Karachkova	8–11, 8–11	(silver) Runner-up
2000	Le Volant d'Or de Toulouse	(Germany) Xu Huaiwen	4–11, 11–8, 4–11	(silver) Runner-up
2004	Luxembourge Memorial Thierry Theis	(Denmark) Louise Thastrup	11–0, 11–1	(gold) Winner
2006	Polish International	(Indonesia) Atu Rosalina	17–21, 13–21	(gold) Winner
2006	Latvia International	(Russia) Elena Shimko		(gold) Winner

Women's doubles
Year	Tournament	Partner	Opponent	Score	Result
1993	Slovenian International	(Ukraine) Irina Koloskova	(Ukraine) Natalja Esipenko (Switzerland) Santi Wibowo	15–7, 15–2	(gold) Winner
1993	Romanian International	(Ukraine) Irina Koloskova			(gold) Winner
1994	Slovak International	(Ukraine) Victoria Evtoushenko	(Russia) Svetlana Alferova (Russia) Elena Denisova	15–1, 15–3	(gold) Winner
1994	Bulgarian International	(Ukraine) Victoria Evtoushenko	(Czech Republic) Markéta Koudelková (Czech Republic) Eva Lacinová	15–11, 15–7	(gold) Winner
1995	Slovak International	(Ukraine) Victoria Evtoushenko	(Kazakhstan) Ludmila Okuneva (Kazakhstan) Olesia Sholar	15–2, 17–15	(gold) Winner
1997	Le Volant d'Or de Toulouse	(Ukraine) Victoria Evtoushenko	(France) Armelle Cassen (France) Tatiana Vattier	15–3, 15–7	(gold) Winner
1998	Le Volant d'Or de Toulouse	(Ukraine) Victoria Evtoushenko	(Switzerland) Judith Baumeyer (Switzerland) Santi Wibowo	15–4, 12–15, 15–6	(gold) Winner
2001	BMW International	(Bulgaria) Neli Boteva	(Netherlands) Lonneke Janssen (Netherlands) Lotte Jonathans	7–5, 7–5, 4–7, 7–4	(gold) Winner
2003	Le Volant d'Or de Toulouse	(Ukraine) Larisa Griga	(Poland) Kamila Augustyn (Poland) Nadieżda Kostiuczyk	10–15, 2–15	(silver) Runner-up
2004	Luxembourge Memorial Thierry Theis	(Luxembourg) Hariati	(Bulgaria) Dimitriika Dimitrova (Denmark) Janni Kjær	2–15, 6–15	(silver) Runner-up

Mixed doubles
Year	Tournament	Partner	Opponent	Score	Result
1993	Slovenian International	(Ukraine) Valeriy Streltsov	(Switzerland) Lawrence Chew Si Hock (Switzerland) Santi Wibowo	15–4, 18–15	(gold) Winner
1993	Hungarian International	(Ukraine) Valeriy Streltsov	(Germany) Kai Mitteldorf (Germany) Nicol Pitro	15–10, 12–15, 17–14	(gold) Winner
1993	Romanian International	(Ukraine) Valeriy Streltsov			(gold) Winner
1997	Le Volant d'Or de Toulouse	(Ukraine) Valeriy Streltsov	(Ukraine) Konstantin Tatranov (Ukraine) Victoria Evtoushenko	8–15, 15–9, 3–6 retired	(gold) Winner
2001	BMW International	(Ukraine) Vladislav Druzchenko	(Netherlands) Chris Bruil (Netherlands) Lotte Jonathans	3–7, 7–5, 7–2, 0–7, 2–7	(silver) Runner-up
2003	Le Volant d'Or de Toulouse	(Ukraine) Vladislav Druzchenko	(Ukraine) Dmitry Miznikov (Ukraine) Natalia Golovkina	15–6, 15–2	(gold) Winner
2004	Luxembourge Memorial Thierry Theis	(Ukraine) Valeriy Streltsov	(Bulgaria) Dimitriika Dimitrova (Denmark) Janni Kjær	15–12, 15–7	(gold) Winner
2004	Polish Open	(Ukraine) Vladislav Druzchenko	(China) Pan Pan (China) Sun Junjie	15–11, 15–7	(gold) Winner
2004	Finnish International	(Ukraine) Vladislav Druzchenko	(Belarus) Andrei Konakh (Belarus) Olga Konon	15–9, 11–15, 15–17	(silver) Runner-up

BWF International Challenge tournament
BWF International Series tournament
BWF Future Series tournament
