= 1998 Asian Junior Badminton Championships – Girls' team =

Badminton championship in Kuala Lumpur, Malaysia

Girls' team at the 1998 Asian Junior Badminton Championships
- Venue: Kuala Lumpur Badminton Stadium
- Location: Kuala Lumpur, Malaysia
- Dates: 15–17 June 1998

The girls' team tournament at the 1998 Asian Junior Badminton Championships took place from 15 to 17 June 1998 at the Kuala Lumpur Badminton Stadium in Kuala Lumpur, Malaysia. A total of 10 countries competed in this event.

== Results ==
=== Bracket ===
Round of 16
Chinese Taipei	5
Philippines	0
Thailand	0
Malaysia	5
Singapore	5
India	0

Quarter-finals
China	3
Sri Lanka	2
Japan	1
Chinese Taipei	4
South Korea	4
Malaysia	1
Singapore	1
Indonesia	4

Semi-finals
China	5
Chinese Taipei	0
South Korea	3
Indonesia	2

Final
China	5
South Korea	0

=== Final ===
China
5
Kuala Lumpur Badminton Stadium
17 June 1998

South Korea
0

			1	2	3
1	(China) (South Korea)	Gong Ruina; Lee Hyo-jung	11; 8	11; 8
2	(China) (South Korea)	Hu Ting; Jun Jae-youn	11; 7	13; 10
3	(China) (South Korea)	Gong Ruina / Huang Sui; Jun Woul-sik / Lee Hyo-jung	15; 4	9; 15	15; 10
4	(China) (South Korea)	Dong Fang / Xie Xingfang; Lee Ji-sun / Lee Joon-boon	15; 3	15; 2
5	(China) (South Korea)	Rong Yi; Jun Woul-sik	11; 1	11; 2
