= 2005 IBF World Championships – Men's doubles =

Men's doubles at the 2005 IBF World Championships
- Venue: Arrowhead Pond
- Location: Anaheim, United States
- Dates: August 15, 2005 – August 21, 2005

Medalists
gold medal	Tony Gunawan; Howard Bach	United States
silver medal	Candra Wijaya; Sigit Budiarto	Indonesia
bronze medal	Luluk Hadiyanto; Alvent Yulianto	Indonesia
bronze medal	Chan Chong Ming; Koo Kien Keat	Malaysia

The 2005 IBF World Championships (World Badminton Championships) took place in Arrowhead Pond in Anaheim, United States, between August 15 and August 21, 2005. Following the results in the men's doubles.

== Seeds ==
1. (Denmark) Jens Eriksen / Martin Lundgaard Hansen, Quarter-final
2. (Indonesia) Candra Wijaya / Sigit Budiarto, Runners-up
3. (China) Fu Haifeng / Cai Yun, Third round
4. (Indonesia) Luluk Hadiyanto / Alvent Yulianto, Semi-final
5. (Denmark) Lars Paaske / Jonas Rasmussen, Quarter-final
6. (Denmark) Mathias Boe / Carsten Mogensen, Third round
7. (South Korea) Jung Jae-sung / Lee Jae-jin, Quarter-final
8. (Malaysia) Chew Choon Eng / Choong Tan Fook, Third round
9. (Malaysia) Chan Chong Ming / Koo Kien Keat, Semi-final
10. (Indonesia) Flandy Limpele / Eng Hian, Quarter-final
11. (Denmark) Thomas Laybourn / Peter Steffensen, Third round
12. (Malaysia) Mohd Fairuzizi Mohd Tazari / Lin Woon Fui, Third round
13. (United States) Tony Gunawan / Howard Bach, Champions
14. (Malaysia) Tan Bin Shen / Ong Soon Hock, Third round
15. (Hong Kong) Liu Kwok Wa / Albertus Susanto Njoto, Third round
16. (Poland) Michał Łogosz / Robert Mateusiak, Third round

== Main stage ==
=== Section 1 ===
First round
1	(Denmark) Jens Eriksen (Denmark) Martin Lundgaard Hansen
Bye
(Pakistan) Wajid Ali (Pakistan) Omar Zeeshan
Bye
11	(Denmark) Thomas Laybourn (Denmark) Peter Steffensen	15	15
(New Zealand) Daniel Shirley (New Zealand) John Gordon	13	13
(Belgium) Frederic Mawet (Belgium) Wouter Claes	15	15
(Slovenia) Miha Horvat (Slovenia) Gasper Plestenjak	6	4
8	(Malaysia) Chew Choon Eng (Malaysia) Choong Tan Fook
Bye
(United States) Eric Go (United States) Ronald Sou	8	7
(China) Sang Yang (China) Zheng Bo	15	15
13	(United States) Tony Gunawan (United States) Howard Bach	15	15
(Wales) Matthew Hughes (Wales) Martyn Lewis	0	3
(Czech Republic) Jan Vondra (Czech Republic) Jan Fröhlich	7	15	15
(Canada) Brad Enns (Canada) Greg Bury	15	9	7

Second round
1	(Denmark) Jens Eriksen (Denmark) Martin Hansen	w.o.
(Pakistan) Wajid Ali (Pakistan) Omar Zeeshan
11	(Denmark) Thomas Laybourn (Denmark) Peter Steffensen	15	15
(Belgium) Frederic Mawet (Belgium) Wouter Claes	6	7
8	(Malaysia) Chew Choon Eng (Malaysia) Choong Tan Fook	15	15
(China) Sang Yang (China) Zheng Bo	8	9
13	(United States) Tony Gunawan (United States) Howard Bach	15	15
(Czech Republic) Jan Vondra (Czech Republic) Jan Fröhlich	5	3

Third round
1	(Denmark) Jens Eriksen (Denmark) Martin Hansen	15	15
11	(Denmark) Thomas Laybourn (Denmark) Peter Steffensen	4	4
8	(Malaysia) Chew Choon Eng (Malaysia) Choong Tan Fook	10	11
13	(United States) Tony Gunawan (United States) Howard Bach	15	15

Quarterfinals
1	(Denmark) Jens Eriksen (Denmark) Martin Hansen	9	10
13	(United States) Tony Gunawan (United States) Howard Bach	15	15

=== Section 2 ===
First round
4	(Indonesia) Luluk Hadiyanto (Indonesia) Alvent Yulianto
Bye
(Japan) Tadashi Ohtsuka (Japan) Keita Masuda	15	15
(Spain) José Antonio Crespo (Spain) Nicolas Escartin Ara	10	7
14	(Malaysia) Tan Bin Shen (Malaysia) Ong Soon Hock	15	15
(Guatemala) Pedro Yang (Guatemala) Erick Anguiano	2	1
(Chinese Taipei) Huang Shih-chung (Chinese Taipei) Chien Yu Hsun	15	15
(Republic of Ireland) Brian Smyth (Republic of Ireland) Scott Evans	6	3
7	(South Korea) Jung Jae Sung (South Korea) Lee Jae Jin
Bye
(Austria) Jürgen Koch (Austria) Peter Zauner	6	9
(Sweden) Fredrik Bergström (Sweden) Henrik Andersson	15	15
16	(Poland) Michal Logosz (Poland) Robert Mateusiak	15	15
(South Africa) Roelof Dednam (South Africa) Chris Dednam	2	8
(England) David Lindley (England) Kristian Roebuck	w.o.
(Iran) Jalal Eskandare (Iran) Golam Reza Bagheri

Second round
4	(Indonesia) Luluk Hadiyanto (Indonesia) Alvent Yulianto	15	15
(Japan) Tadashi Ohtsuka (Japan) Keita Masuda	3	6
14	(Malaysia) Tan Bin Shen (Malaysia) Ong Soon Hock	15	15
(Chinese Taipei) Huang Shih-chung (Chinese Taipei) Chien Yu Hsun	6	11
7	(South Korea) Jung Jae Sung (South Korea) Lee Jae Jin	15	15
(Sweden) Fredrik Bergström (Sweden) Henrik Andersson	3	8
16	(Poland) Michal Logosz (Poland) Robert Mateusiak	15	13	15
(England) David Lindley (England) Kristian Roebuck	11	15	7

Third round
4	(Indonesia) Luluk Hadiyanto (Indonesia) Alvent Yulianto	15	10	15
14	(Malaysia) Tan Bin Shen (Malaysia) Ong Soon Hock	9	15	5
7	(South Korea) Jung Jae Sung (South Korea) Lee Jae Jin	17	15
16	(Poland) Michal Logosz (Poland) Robert Mateusiak	15	7

Quarterfinals
4	(Indonesia) Luluk Hadiyanto (Indonesia) Alvent Yulianto	15	12	15
7	(South Korea) Jung Jae Sung (South Korea) Lee Jae Jin	5	15	7

=== Section 3 ===
First round
(South Korea) Hwang Ji-man (South Korea) Han Sang-hoon	15	15
(United States) Bob Malaythong (United States) Raju Rai	7	8
10	(Indonesia) Flandy Limpele (Indonesia) Eng Hian	15	15
(Trinidad and Tobago) Anil Seepaul (Trinidad and Tobago) Kerwyn Pantin	2	3
(Slovenia) Andrej Pohar (Slovenia) Miha Sepec Jr.	15	10	15
(Scotland) Jamie Neill (Scotland) Keith Turnbull	3	15	0
6	(Denmark) Mathias Boe (Denmark) Carsten Mogensen
Bye
3	(China) Fu Haifeng (China) Cai Yun
bye
(Pakistan) Mir Tahir Ishaq (Pakistan) Ahmed Waqas
(Chinese Taipei) Tsai Chia-Hsin (Chinese Taipei) Hu Chung-Shyan	w.o.
(New Zealand) Geoffrey R. Bellingham (New Zealand) Craig Cooper	15	15
(Japan) Shoji Sato (Japan) Sho Sasaki	11	1
9	(Malaysia) Chan Chong Ming (Malaysia) Koo Kien Keat	15	15
(Peru) Francisco Ugaz (Peru) Juan Jose Espinosa	1	1

Second round
(South Korea) Hwang Ji-man (South Korea) Han Sang-hoon	8	10
10	(Indonesia) Flandy Limpele (Indonesia) Eng Hian	15	15
(Slovenia) Andrej Pohar (Slovenia) Miha Sepec Jr.	3	4
6	(Denmark) Mathias Boe (Denmark) Carsten Mogensen	15	15
3	(China) Fu Haifeng (China) Cai Yun	15	15
(Chinese Taipei) Tsai Chia-Hsin (Chinese Taipei) Hu Chung-Shyan	2	9
(New Zealand) Geoffrey R. Bellingham (New Zealand) Craig Cooper	5	10
9	(Malaysia) Chan Chong Ming (Malaysia) Koo Kien Keat	15	15

Third round
10	(Indonesia) Flandy Limpele (Indonesia) Eng Hian	15	15
6	(Denmark) Mathias Boe (Denmark) Carsten Mogensen	12	7
3	(China) Fu Haifeng (China) Cai Yun	15	4	8
9	(Malaysia) Chan Chong Ming (Malaysia) Koo Kien Keat	11	15	15

Quarterfinals
10	(Indonesia) Flandy Limpele (Indonesia) Eng Hian	15	12	10
9	(Malaysia) Chan Chong Ming (Malaysia) Koo Kien Keat	6	15	15

=== Section 4 ===
First round
(Japan) Tōru Matsumoto (Japan) Keishi Kawaguchi	15	15
(Switzerland) Michael Andrey (Switzerland) Christian Bösiger	9	6
15	(Hong Kong) Liu Kwok Wa (Hong Kong) Albertus Susanto Njoto	15	15
(England) Paul Trueman (England) Ian Palethorpe	6	4
(Germany) Kristof Hopp (Germany) Ingo Kindervater	13	15	17
(Canada) Mike Beres (Canada) William Milroy	15	11	14
5	(Denmark) Lars Paaske (Denmark) Jonas Rasmussen
bye
12	(Malaysia) Mohd Fairuzizi Mohd Tazari (Malaysia) Lin Woon Fui	15	5	15
(England) Simon Archer (England) Anthony Clark	7	15	12
(France) Erwin Kehlhoffner (France) Thomas Quere	15	3	8
(Thailand) Sudket Prapakamol (Thailand) Patapol Ngernsrisuk	10	15	15
(India) Rupesh Kumar (India) Thomas Sanave
bye
2	(Indonesia) Candra Wijaya (Indonesia) Sigit Budiarto
bye

Second round
(Japan) Tōru Matsumoto (Japan) Keishi Kawaguchi	17	12	5
15	(Hong Kong) Liu Kwok Wa (Hong Kong) Albertus Susanto Njoto	14	15	15
(Germany) Kristof Hopp (Germany) Ingo Kindervater	1	6
5	(Denmark) Lars Paaske (Denmark) Jonas Rasmussen	15	15
12	(Malaysia) Mohd Fairuzizi Mohd Tazari (Malaysia) Lin Woon Fui	15	15
(Thailand) Sudket Prapakamol (Thailand) Patapol Ngernsrisuk	9	2
(India) Rupesh Kumar (India) Thomas Sanave	11	11
2	(Indonesia) Candra Wijaya (Indonesia) Sigit Budiarto	15	15

Third round
15	(Hong Kong) Liu Kwok Wa (Hong Kong) Albertus Susanto Njoto	3	0
5	(Denmark) Lars Paaske (Denmark) Jonas Rasmussen	15	15
12	(Malaysia) Mohd Fairuzizi Mohd Tazari (Malaysia) Lin Woon Fui	7	10
2	(Indonesia) Candra Wijaya (Indonesia) Sigit Budiarto	15	15

Quarterfinals
5	(Denmark) Lars Paaske (Denmark) Jonas Rasmussen	10	15	9
2	(Indonesia) Candra Wijaya (Indonesia) Sigit Budiarto	15	11	15

== Final stage ==
Quarterfinals
1	(Denmark) Jens Eriksen (Denmark) Martin Lundgaard Hansen	9	10
13	(United States) Tony Gunawan (United States) Howard Bach	15	15
4	(Indonesia) Luluk Hadiyanto (Indonesia) Alvent Yulianto	15	12	15
7	(South Korea) Jung Jae-sung (South Korea) Lee Jae-jin	5	15	7
10	(Indonesia) Flandy Limpele (Indonesia) Eng Hian	15	12	10
9	(Malaysia) Chan Chong Ming (Malaysia) Koo Kien Keat	6	15	15
5	(Denmark) Lars Paaske (Denmark) Jonas Rasmussen	10	15	9
2	(Indonesia) Candra Wijaya (Indonesia) Sigit Budiarto	15	11	15

Semifinals
13	(United States) Tony Gunawan (United States) Howard Bach	15	15
4	(Indonesia) Luluk Hadiyanto (Indonesia) Alvent Yulianto	9	13
9	(Malaysia) Chan Chong Ming (Malaysia) Koo Kien Keat	9	11
2	(Indonesia) Candra Wijaya (Indonesia) Sigit Budiarto	15	15

Finals
13	(United States) Tony Gunawan (United States) Howard Bach	15	10	15
2	(Indonesia) Candra Wijaya (Indonesia) Sigit Budiarto	11	15	11
