= Sudket Prapakamol =

Thai badminton player

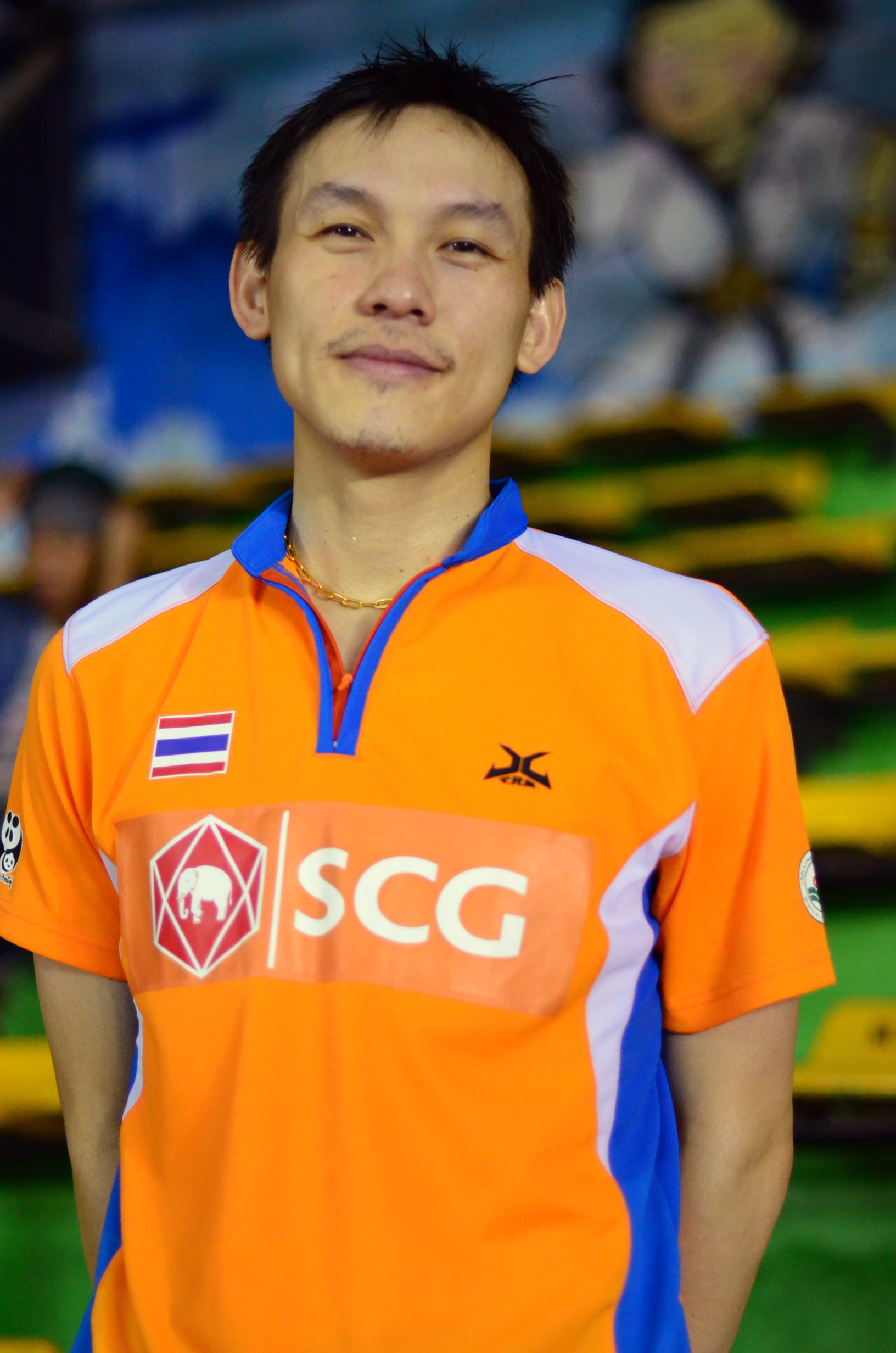

Personal information
- Born: 8 February 1980 (age 46) Chonburi, Thailand
- Height: 1.73 m (5 ft 8 in)
- Weight: 65 kg (143 lb)

Sport
- Country: Thailand
- Sport: Badminton
- Handedness: Right
- Retired: February 2016

Men's & mixed doubles
- Highest ranking: 20 (MD 13 January 2011); 2 (XD 11 August 2011)
- BWF profile
Medal record
Representing Thailand
Men's Badminton
World Championships
Bronze medal – third place	2005 Anaheim	Mixed doubles
Bronze medal – third place	2006 Madrid	Mixed doubles
World Cup
Bronze medal – third place	2005 Yiyang	Mixed doubles
Sudirman Cup
Bronze medal – third place	2013 Kuala Lumpur	Mixed team
Asian Games
Bronze medal – third place	2006 Doha	Mixed doubles
Bronze medal – third place	2010 Guangzhou	Men's team
Asian Championships
Gold medal – first place	2005 Hyderabad	Mixed doubles
Silver medal – second place	2004 Kuala Lumpur	Mixed doubles
Silver medal – second place	2006 Johor Bahru	Mixed doubles
Bronze medal – third place	2011 Chengdu	Mixed doubles
Bronze medal – third place	2014 Gimcheon	Mixed doubles
Southeast Asian Games
Gold medal – first place	2003 Vietnam	Mixed doubles
Silver medal – second place	2003 Vietnam	Men's team
Silver medal – second place	2007 Nakhon Ratchasima	Mixed doubles
Silver medal – second place	2011 Jakarta–Palembang	Mixed doubles
Silver medal – second place	2015 Singapore	Men's team
Bronze medal – third place	1999 Bandar Seri Begawan	Men's team
Bronze medal – third place	2001 Kuala Lumpur	Men's team
Bronze medal – third place	2003 Vietnam	Men's doubles
Bronze medal – third place	2005 Manila	Men's team
Bronze medal – third place	2007 Nakhon Ratchasima	Men's team
Bronze medal – third place	2009 Vientiane	Men's team
Bronze medal – third place	2011 Jakarta–Palembang	Men's team
Bronze medal – third place	2015 Singapore	Mixed doubles
Summer Universiade
Gold medal – first place	2007 Bangkok	Men's doubles
Gold medal – first place	2007 Bangkok	Mixed team
Bronze medal – third place	2007 Bangkok	Mixed doubles
World Junior Championships
Bronze medal – third place	1998 Melbourne	Boys' doubles
Asian Junior Championships
Bronze medal – third place	1998 Kuala Lumpur	Boys' doubles

Sudket Prapakamol (Thai: สุดเขต ประภากมล; RTGS: Sutkhet Praphakamon; born 8 February 1980) is a badminton player from Thailand.

== Career ==
He competed in badminton at the 2004 Summer Olympics in men's doubles with partner Patapol Ngernsrisuk. They were defeated in the round of 32 by Anthony Clark and Nathan Robertson of Great Britain. Prapakamol also competed in the mixed doubles with partner Saralee Thungthongkam. They had a bye in the first round and were defeated by Fredrik Bergström and Johanna Persson of Sweden in the round of 16.

He played for Thailand in Thomas Cup 2008 as with Songpol Anukritayawan. Thailand was crushed in the quarter finals. Prapakamol made his second appearance at the Olympic Games in 2008. He and Thungthongkam were defeated by the first seeded from Indonesia Nova Widianto and Liliyana Natsir in the quarter finals.

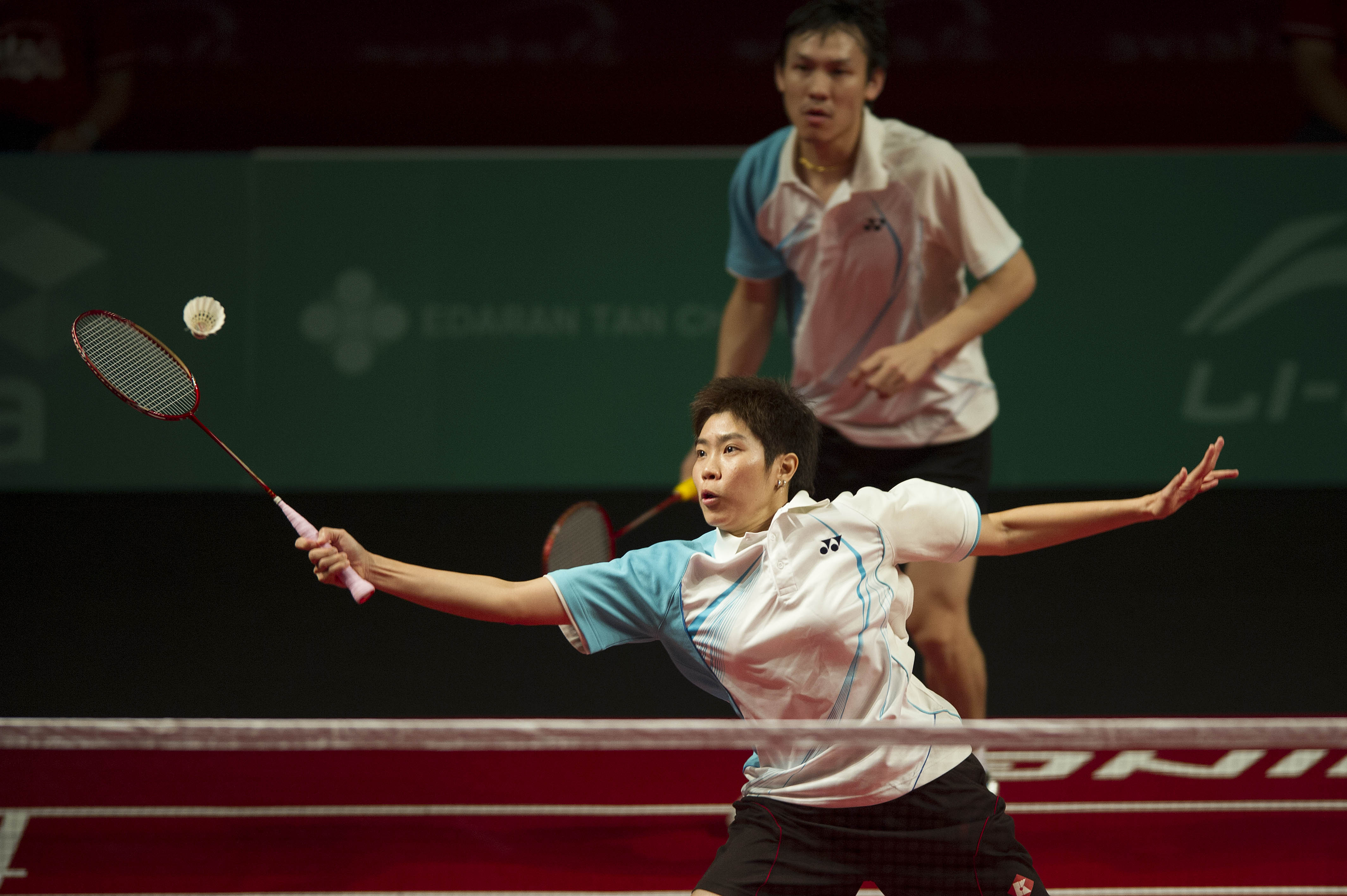
Prapakamol with his partner in the mixed doubles Saralee Thungthongkam

In 2012, Prapakamol and Thungthongkam again competed in the Olympic Games, played in the mixed doubles, reaching the quarter finals where they were beaten by Christinna Pedersen and Joachim Fischer Nielsen of Denmark.

He ended his international career after competed at the Thailand Masters in February 2016.

== Achievements ==
=== World Championships ===
Mixed doubles
Year	Venue	Partner	Opponent	Score	Result
2005	Arrowhead Pond, Anaheim, United States	(Thailand) Saralee Thungthongkam	(Indonesia) Nova Widianto (Indonesia) Liliyana Natsir	9–15, 15–3, 10–15	Bronze
2006	Palacio de Deportes de la Comunidad; Madrid, Spain	(Thailand) Saralee Thungthongkam	(England) Nathan Robertson (England) Gail Emms	18–21, 21–17, 23–25	Bronze

=== World Cup ===
Mixed doubles
Year	Venue	Partner	Opponent	Score	Result
2005	Olympic Park, Yiyang, China	(Thailand) Saralee Thungthongkam	(China) Xie Zhongbo (China) Zhang Yawen	12–21, 19–21	Bronze

=== Asian Games ===
Mixed doubles
Year	Venue	Partner	Opponent	Score	Result
2006	Aspire Hall 3, Doha, Qatar	(Thailand) Saralee Thungthongkam	(China) Xie Zhongbo (China) Zhang Yawen	11–21, 19–21	Bronze

=== Asian Championships ===
Mixed doubles
Year	Venue	Partner	Opponent	Score	Result
2004	Kuala Lumpur Badminton Stadium; Kuala Lumpur, Malaysia	(Thailand) Saralee Thungthongkam	(South Korea) Kim Dong-moon (South Korea) Ra Kyung-min	10–15, 16–17	Silver
2005	Gachibowli Indoor Stadium; Hyderabad, India	(Thailand) Saralee Thungthongkam	(South Korea) Lee Jae-jin (South Korea) Lee Hyo-jung	15–11, 14–17, 15–10	Gold
2006	Bandaraya Stadium; Johor Bahru, Malaysia	(Thailand) Saralee Thungthongkam	(Indonesia) Nova Widianto (Indonesia) Liliyana Natsir	16–21, 23–21, 14–21	Silver
2011	Sichuan Gymnasium; Chengdu, China	(Thailand) Saralee Thungthongkam	(China) Xu Chen (China) Ma Jin	17–21, 15–21	Bronze
2014	Gimcheon Indoor Stadium; Gimcheon, South Korea	(Thailand) Saralee Thungthongkam	(South Korea) Shin Baek-choel (South Korea) Jang Ye-na	11–21, 12–21	Bronze

=== Southeast Asian Games ===
Men's doubles
Year	Venue	Partner	Opponent	Score	Result
2003	Tan Binh Sport Center; Ho Chi Minh City, Vietnam	(Thailand) Patapol Ngernsrisuk	(Malaysia) Lee Wan Wah (Malaysia) Choong Tan Fook	5–15, 2–15	Bronze

Mixed doubles
Year	Venue	Partner	Opponent	Score	Result
2003	Tan Binh Sport Center; Ho Chi Minh City, Vietnam	(Thailand) Saralee Thungthongkam	(Indonesia) Anggun Nugroho (Indonesia) Eny Widiowati	15–12, 15–7	Gold
2007	Wongchawalitkul University; Nakhon Ratchasima, Thailand	(Thailand) Saralee Thungthongkam	(Indonesia) Flandy Limpele (Indonesia) Vita Marissa	14–21, 15–21	Silver
2011	Istora Senayan; Jakarta, Indonesia	(Thailand) Saralee Thungthongkam	(Indonesia) Tontowi Ahmad (Indonesia) Liliyana Natsir	7–21, 14–21	Silver
2015	Singapore Indoor Stadium; Singapore	(Thailand) Sapsiree Taerattanachai	(Indonesia) Praveen Jordan (Indonesia) Debby Susanto	13–21, 21–8, 14–21	Bronze

=== Summer Universiade ===
Men's doubles
Year	Venue	Partner	Opponent	Score	Result
2007	Thammasat University, Pathum Thani, Thailand	(Thailand) Patapol Ngernsrisuk	(Chinese Taipei) Tsai Chia-hsin (Chinese Taipei) Hsieh Yu-hsing	17–21, 21–17, 21–14	Gold

Mixed doubles
Year	Venue	Partner	Opponent	Score	Result
2007	Thammasat University, Pathum Thani, Thailand	(Thailand) Salakjit Ponsana	(Chinese Taipei) Fang Chieh-min (Chinese Taipei) Cheng Wen-hsing	16–21, 18–21	Bronze

=== World Junior Championships ===
Boys' doubles
Year	Venue	Partner	Opponent	Score	Result
1998	Sports and Aquatic Centre, Melbourne, Australia	(Thailand) Patapol Ngernsrisuk	(China) Cai Yun (China) Jiang Shan	15–13, 2–15, 10–15	Bronze

=== Asian Junior Championships ===
Boys' doubles
Year	Venue	Partner	Opponent	Score	Result
1998	Kuala Lumpur Badminton Stadium, Kuala Lumpur, Malaysia	(Thailand) Patapol Ngernsrisuk	(Malaysia) Chan Chong Ming (Malaysia) Teo Kok Seng	11–15, 9–15	Bronze

=== BWF Superseries ===
The BWF Superseries, which was launched on 14 December 2006 and implemented in 2007, is a series of elite badminton tournaments, sanctioned by the Badminton World Federation (BWF). BWF Superseries levels are Superseries and Superseries Premier. A season of Superseries consists of twelve tournaments around the world that have been introduced since 2011. Successful players are invited to the Superseries Finals, which are held at the end of each year.

Mixed doubles
Year	Tournament	Partner	Opponent	Score	Result
2007	Singapore Open	(Thailand) Saralee Thungthongkam	(Indonesia) Flandy Limpele (Indonesia) Vita Marissa	14–21, 13–21	(silver) Runner-up
2007	China Open	(Thailand) Saralee Thungthongkam	(Indonesia) Nova Widianto (Indonesia) Liliyana Natsir	21–15, 18–21, 11–21	(silver) Runner-up
2010	French Open	(Thailand) Saralee Thungthongkam	(Germany) Michael Fuchs (Germany) Birgit Overzier	21–15, 21–15	(gold) Winner
2010	World Superseries Finals	(Thailand) Saralee Thungthongkam	(China) Zhang Nan (China) Zhao Yunlei	17–21, 12–21	(silver) Runner-up
2011	All England Open	(Thailand) Saralee Thungthongkam	(China) Xu Chen (China) Ma Jin	13–21, 9–21	(silver) Runner-up
2012	India Open	(Thailand) Saralee Thungthongkam	(Indonesia) Tontowi Ahmad (Indonesia) Liliyana Natsir	16–21, 21–12, 14–21	(silver) Runner-up
2012	Indonesia Open	(Thailand) Saralee Thungthongkam	(Indonesia) Tontowi Ahmad (Indonesia) Liliyana Natsir	21–17, 17–21, 21–13	(gold) Winner

BWF Super Series Finals tournament
BWF Super Series Premier tournament
BWF Super Series tournament

=== BWF Grand Prix ===
The BWF Grand Prix had two levels, the BWF Grand Prix and Grand Prix Gold. It was a series of badminton tournaments sanctioned by the Badminton World Federation (BWF) which was held from 2007 to 2017. The World Badminton Grand Prix sanctioned by International Badminton Federation (IBF) from 1983 to 2006.

Men's doubles
Year	Tournament	Partner	Opponent	Score	Result
2003	Thailand Open	(Thailand) Patapol Ngernsrisuk	(South Korea) Ha Tae-kwon (South Korea) Yoo Yong-sung	8–15, 6–15	(silver) Runner-up

Mixed doubles
Year	Tournament	Partner	Opponent	Score	Result
2004	Thailand Open	(Thailand) Saralee Thungthongkam	(England) Nathan Robertson (England) Gail Emms	15–8, 12–15, 11–15	(silver) Runner-up
2004	Japan Open	(Thailand) Saralee Thungthongkam	(Indonesia) Nova Widianto (Indonesia) Vita Marissa	10–15, 13–15	(silver) Runner-up
2005	Japan Open	(Thailand) Saralee Thungthongkam	(Denmark) Jens Eriksen (Denmark) Mette Schjoldager	15–13, 14–17, 15–7	(gold) Winner
2005	Singapore Open	(Thailand) Saralee Thungthongkam	(China) Zhang Jun (China) Gao Ling	15–10, 7–15, 5–15	(silver) Runner-up
2006	Thailand Open	(Thailand) Saralee Thungthongkam	(South Korea) Lee Yong-dae (South Korea) Hwang Yu-mi	11–21, 21–18, 20–22	(silver) Runner-up
2009	Thailand Open	(Thailand) Saralee Thungthongkam	(Thailand) Songphon Anugritayawon (Thailand) Kunchala Voravichitchaikul	21–11, 17–21, 14–21	(silver) Runner-up
2010	Malaysia Masters	(Thailand) Saralee Thungthongkam	(Indonesia) Devin Lahardi Fitriawan (Indonesia) Liliyana Natsir	21–13, 16–21, 17–21	(silver) Runner-up
2011	Dutch Open	(Thailand) Saralee Thungthongkam	(Thailand) Songphon Anugritayawon (Thailand) Kunchala Voravichitchaikul	17–21, 22–24	(silver) Runner-up
2011	India Grand Prix Gold	(Thailand) Saralee Thungthongkam	(Indonesia) Muhammad Rijal (Indonesia) Debby Susanto	16–21, 21–18, 21–11	(gold) Winner
2012	Swiss Open	(Thailand) Saralee Thungthongkam	(Indonesia) Tontowi Ahmad (Indonesia) Liliyana Natsir	16–21, 14–21	(silver) Runner-up
2012	Thailand Open	(Thailand) Saralee Thungthongkam	(China) Tao Jiaming (China) Tang Jinhua	14–21, 16–21	(silver) Runner-up
2015	Dutch Open	(Thailand) Saralee Thungthongkam	(France) Ronan Labar (France) Émilie Lefel	10–21, 18–21	(silver) Runner-up

BWF Grand Prix Gold tournament
BWF Grand Prix tournament

=== IBF International ===
Men's doubles
Year	Tournament	Partner	Opponent	Score	Result
1999	Myanmar International	(Thailand) Patapol Ngernsrisuk	(Malaysia) Chan Huan Chun (Malaysia) Hong Chieng Hun	15–9, 15–11	(gold) Winner
1999	Smiling Fish Satellite	(Thailand) Patapol Ngernsrisuk	(Singapore) Patrick Lau (Singapore) Aman Santosa	15–11, 16–17, 15–11	(gold) Winner
2000	Smiling Fish Satellite	(Thailand) Patapol Ngernsrisuk	(China) Ge Cheng (China) Tao Xiaoqiang	12–15, 15–8, 5–15	(silver) Runner-up
2001	Smiling Fish Satellite	(Thailand) Kitipon Kitikul	(Thailand) Patapol Ngernsrisuk (Thailand) Khunakorn Sudhisodhi	9–15, 7–15	(silver) Runner-up
2001	India Satellite	(Thailand) Kitipon Kitikul	(Malaysia) Ng Kean Kok (Malaysia) Rosman Razak	15–11, 13–15, 2–15	(silver) Runner-up
2002	Vietnam Satellite	(Thailand) Jakrapan Thanathiratham	(Indonesia) Hendri Saputra (Indonesia) Denny Setiawan	4–15, 11–15	(silver) Runner-up
2003	Smiling Fish Satellite	(Thailand) Patapol Ngernsrisuk	(Indonesia) Hendri Saputra (Indonesia) Denny Setiawan	15–10, 15–10	(gold) Winner
2006	Vietnam Satellite	(Thailand) Patapol Ngernsrisuk	(Hong Kong) Albertus Susanto Njoto (Hong Kong) Yohan Hadikusumo Wiratama	21–16, 21–11	(gold) Winner
2006	Thailand Asian Satellite	(Thailand) Patapol Ngernsrisuk	(Indonesia) Hendra Aprida Gunawan (Indonesia) Joko Riyadi	14–21, 21–16, 21–15	(gold) Winner

Mixed doubles
Year	Tournament	Partner	Opponent	Score	Result
1999	Smiling Fish Satellite	(Thailand) Sathinee Chankrachangwong	(Thailand) Anurak Thiraratsakul (Thailand) Methinee Narawirawuth	11–15, 9–15	(silver) Runner-up
2001	Smiling Fish Satellite	(Thailand) Sujitra Ekmongkolpaisarn	(Malaysia) Ng Kean Kok (Malaysia) Fong Chen Yen	15–6, 15–8	(gold) Winner
2001	Malaysia Satellite	(Thailand) Kunchala Voravichitchaikul	(China) Chen Jibin (China) Cheng Jiao	5–7, 0–7, 6–8	(silver) Runner-up
2002	Vietnam Satellite	(Thailand) Salakjit Ponsana	(Vietnam) Trần Đức Sang (Vietnam) Nguyễn Hạnh Dung	15–6, 15–4	(gold) Winner
2003	Smiling Fish Satellite	(Thailand) Sathinee Chankrachangwong	(Thailand) Songphon Anugritayawon (Thailand) Duanganong Aroonkesorn		(silver) Runner-up
