= Patapol Ngernsrisuk =

Thai badminton player (born 1980)

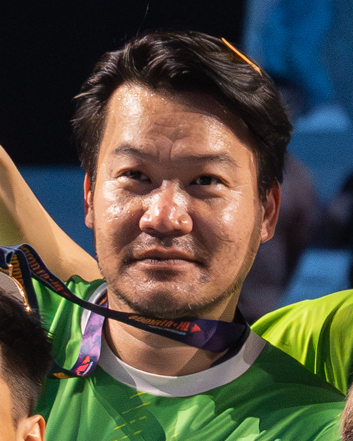
- Patapol in 2024

Personal information
- Born: 29 December 1980 (age 45) Bangkok, Thailand
- Height: 1.72 m (5 ft 8 in)
- Weight: 72 kg (159 lb)

Sport
- Country: Thailand
- Sport: Badminton

Men's doubles
- Highest ranking: 20 (13 January 2011)
- BWF profile
Medal record
Men's badminton
Representing Thailand
Southeast Asian Games
Silver medal – second place	2003 Ho Chi Minh	Men's team
Bronze medal – third place	2001 Kuala Lumpur	Men's team
Bronze medal – third place	2003 Ho Chi Minh	Men's doubles
Bronze medal – third place	2005 Manila	Men's team
Bronze medal – third place	2007 Nakhon Ratchasima	Men's team
Summer Universiade
Gold medal – first place	2007 Bangkok	Men's doubles
Gold medal – first place	2007 Bangkok	Mixed team
World Junior Championships
Bronze medal – third place	1998 Melbourne	Boys' doubles
Asia Junior Championships
Bronze medal – third place	1998 Kuala Lumpur	Boys' doubles

Patapol Ngernsrisuk (Thai: ภัททพล เงินศรีสุข; born 29 December 1980) is a Thai former badminton player. He competed in badminton at the 2004 Summer Olympics in men's doubles with partner Sudket Prapakamol. They were defeated in the round of 32 by Anthony Clark and Nathan Robertson of the United Kingdom. In 2007, he won the gold medals at the Summer Universiade in the men's doubles and mixed team event.

Ngernsrisuk is Ratchanok Intanon and Narissapat Lam's coach.

== Achievements ==
=== Southeast Asian Games ===
Men's doubles
Year	Venue	Partner	Opponent	Score	Result
2003	Tân Bình Gymnasium; Ho Chi Minh City, Vietnam	(Thailand) Sudket Prapakamol	(Malaysia) Choong Tan Fook (Malaysia) Lee Wan Wah	5–15, 2–15	Bronze

=== Summer Universiade ===
Men's doubles
Year	Venue	Partner	Opponent	Score	Result
2007	Thammasat University; Pathum Thani, Thailand	(Thailand) Sudket Prapakamol	(Chinese Taipei) Hsieh Yu-hsing (Chinese Taipei) Tsai Chia-hsin	17–21, 21–17, 21–14	Gold

=== World Junior Championships ===
Boys' doubles
Year	Venue	Partner	Opponent	Score	Result
1998	Sports and Aquatic Centre; Melbourne, Australia	(Thailand) Sudket Prapakamol	(China) Cai Yun (China) Jiang Shan	15–13, 2–15, 10–15	Bronze

=== Asian Junior Championships ===
Boys' doubles
Year	Venue	Partner	Opponent	Score	Result
1998	Kuala Lumpur Badminton Stadium; Kuala Lumpur, Malaysia	(Thailand) Sudket Prapakamol	(Malaysia) Chan Chong Ming (Malaysia) Teo Kok Seng	11–15, 9–15	Bronze

=== IBF World Grand Prix ===
The World Badminton Grand Prix was sanctioned by the International Badminton Federation from 1983 to 2006.

Men's doubles
Year	Tournament	Partner	Opponent	Score	Result
2003	Thailand Open	(Thailand) Sudket Prapakamol	(South Korea) Ha Tae-kwon (South Korea) Yoo Yong-sung	8–15, 6–15	(silver) Runner-up

=== IBF International ===
Men's doubles
Year	Tournament	Partner	Opponent	Score	Result
1999	Myanmar International	(Thailand) Sudket Prapakamol	(Malaysia) Chan Huan Chun (Malaysia) Hong Chieng Hun	15–9, 15–11	(gold) Winner
1999	Smiling Fish Satellite	(Thailand) Sudket Prapakamol	(Singapore) Patrick Lau (Singapore) Aman Santosa	15–11, 16–17, 15–11	(gold) Winner
2000	Smiling Fish Satellite	(Thailand) Sudket Prapakamol	(China) Ge Cheng (China) Tao Xiaoqiang	12–15, 15–8, 5–15	(silver) Runner-up
2001	Smiling Fish Satellite	(Thailand) Khunakorn Sudhisodhi	(Thailand) Kittipon Kittikul (Thailand) Sudket Prapakamol	15–9, 15–7	(gold) Winner
2002	Macau Satellite	(Thailand) Khunakorn Sudhisodhi	(Japan) Shuichi Nakao (Japan) Shuichi Sakamoto	5–15, 15–2, 15–6	(gold) Winner
2003	Smiling Fish Satellite	(Thailand) Sudket Prapakamol	(Indonesia) Hendri Saputra (Indonesia) Denny Setiawan	15–10, 15–10	(gold) Winner
2006	Vietnam Satellite	(Thailand) Sudket Prapakamol	(Hong Kong) Albertus Susanto Njoto (Hong Kong) Yohan Hadikusumo Wiratama	21–16, 21–11	(gold) Winner
2006	Thailand Asian Satellite	(Thailand) Sudket Prapakamol	(Indonesia) Hendra Aprida Gunawan (Indonesia) Joko Riyadi	14–21, 21–16, 21–15	(gold) Winner
