= Choi Min-ho (disambiguation) =

- Hangul: 최민호
- RR: Choe Minho
- MR: Ch'oe Minho

- Choi Min-ho (born 1991), South Korean rapper, singer and actor, member of Shinee.
- Choi Min-ho (badminton) (born 1980), South Korean badminton player
- Choi Min-ho (judoka) (born 1980), South Korean judoka
- Choi Min-ho (volleyball) (born 1988), South Korean volleyball player
- Minos (birth name Choi Min-ho, born 1983), South Korean rapper
