= Dong Fang =

Chinese badminton player

Dong Fang 董芳
Personal information
- Born: 12 February 1981 (age 45) Shashi, Hubei, China
- Height: 1.70 m (5 ft 7 in)

Sport
- Country: China
- Sport: Badminton
- Handedness: Right
- Event: Women's singles

Women's singles
- BWF profile
Medal record
Women's badminton
Representing China
Asian Championships
Bronze medal – third place	2001 Manila	Women's singles
World Junior Championships
Bronze medal – third place	1998 Melbourne	Girls' singles
Asian Junior Championships
Gold medal – first place	1998 Kuala Lumpur	Girls' team
Bronze medal – third place	1998 Kuala Lumpur	Girls' singles
Bronze medal – third place	1998 Kuala Lumpur	Girls' doubles

Dong Fang (Chinese: 董芳, born 12 February 1981) is a former Chinese badminton player from Shashi, Hubei. Dong represented her country at the 1998 Asian Junior Championships winning a gold in the girls' team event, and two bronze medals in the girls' singles and doubles event. She also claimed the bronze medal in the girls' singles at the 1998 World Junior Championships. She won the senior international tournament at the 2000 German Open, beating her compatriot from Hubei, Hu Ting in straight games. Dong reached the semi-final round at the 2001 Asian Championships, but defeated by Wang Chen of Hong Kong, clinched the bronze medal.

== Achievements ==
=== Asian Championships ===
Women's singles
Year	Venue	Opponent	Score	Result
2001	PhilSports Arena; Manila, Philippines	(Hong Kong) Wang Chen	11–5, 1–11, 4–11	Bronze

=== World Junior Championships ===
Girls' singles
Year	Venue	Opponent	Score	Result
1998	Sports and Aquatic Centre; Melbourne, Australia	(China) Gong Ruina	4–11, 8–11	Bronze

=== Asian Junior Championships ===
Girls' singles
Year	Venue	Opponent	Score	Result
1998	Kuala Lumpur Badminton Stadium; Kuala Lumpur, Malaysia	(China) Hu Ting	6–11, 3–11	Bronze

Girls' doubles
Year	Venue	Partner	Opponent	Score	Result
1998	Kuala Lumpur Badminton Stadium; Kuala Lumpur, Malaysia	(China) Xie Xingfang	(South Korea) Lee Hyo-jung (South Korea) Jun Woul-sihk	3–15, 8–15	Bronze

=== IBF World Grand Prix ===
The World Badminton Grand Prix sanctioned by International Badminton Federation (IBF) since 1983.

Women's singles
Year	Tournament	Opponent	Score	Result
2000	German Open	(China) Hu Ting	11–6, 11–3	(gold) Winner
