= Badminton at the 2002 Asian Games – Men's doubles =

Men's doubles at the 2002 Asian Games
- Venue: Gangseo Gymnasium
- Dates: 11–14 October
- Competitors: 32 from 8 nations

Medalists
gold medal	Lee Dong-soo; Yoo Yong-sung	South Korea
silver medal	Pramote Teerawiwatana; Tesana Panvisvas	Thailand
bronze medal	Chan Chong Ming; Chew Choon Eng	Malaysia
bronze medal	Halim Haryanto; Tri Kusharjanto	Indonesia

The badminton men's doubles tournament at the 2002 Asian Games in Busan took place from 11 November to 14 November at Gangseo Gymnasium.

The Korean duo of Lee Dong-soo and Yoo Yong-sung won the gold in this tournament.

== Schedule ==
All times are Korea Standard Time (UTC+09:00)

Date	Time	Event
Friday, 11 October 2002	18:45	Preliminaries 1st
Saturday, 12 October 2002	19:00	Quarterfinals
Sunday, 13 October 2002	19:00	Semifinals
Monday, 14 October 2002	16:05	Final

== Results ==
Legend

- WO — Won by walkover

Preliminaries 1st
1	Lee Dong-soo (KOR); Yoo Yong-sung (KOR)	15	15
Wong Tsz Yin (HKG); Tam Lok Tin (HKG)	2	1
Khishigjargalyn Byambadorj (MGL); Norjingiin Khosbayar (MGL)	1	0
Khunakorn Sudhisodhi (THA); Patapol Ngernsrisuk (THA)	15	15
4	Chan Chong Ming (MAS); Chew Choon Eng (MAS)	15	7	17
Zhang Wei (CHN); Wang Wei (CHN)	7	15	14
Candra Wijaya (INA); Sigit Budiarto (INA)	15	15
Hosemari Fujimoto (JPN); Sho Sasaki (JPN)	10	6
Liu Kwok Wa (HKG); Yau Tsz Yuk (HKG)	13	10
Liu Yong (CHN); Chen Qiqiu (CHN)	15	15
Keita Masuda (JPN); Tadashi Otsuka (JPN)	4	9
3	Pramote Teerawiwatana (THA); Tesana Panvisvas (THA)	15	15
Halim Haryanto (INA); Tri Kusharjanto (INA)	15	15
Choong Tan Fook (MAS); Chang Kim Wai (MAS)	10	9
Ganzorigiin Erdenebayar (MGL); Jadambagiin Gerel-Erdene (MGL)
2	Kim Dong-moon (KOR); Ha Tae-kwon (KOR)	W	O

Quarterfinals
1	Lee Dong-soo (KOR); Yoo Yong-sung (KOR)	15	15
Khunakorn Sudhisodhi (THA); Patapol Ngernsrisuk (THA)	4	9
4	Chan Chong Ming (MAS); Chew Choon Eng (MAS)	8	17	15
Candra Wijaya (INA); Sigit Budiarto (INA)	15	14	5
Liu Yong (CHN); Chen Qiqiu (CHN)	15	9	11
3	Pramote Teerawiwatana (THA); Tesana Panvisvas (THA)	6	15	15
Halim Haryanto (INA); Tri Kusharjanto (INA)	15	8	15
2	Kim Dong-moon (KOR); Ha Tae-kwon (KOR)	7	15	8

Semifinals
1	Lee Dong-soo (KOR); Yoo Yong-sung (KOR)	17	15
4	Chan Chong Ming (MAS); Chew Choon Eng (MAS)	16	12
3	Pramote Teerawiwatana (THA); Tesana Panvisvas (THA)	17	15
Halim Haryanto (INA); Tri Kusharjanto (INA)	15	8

Finals
1	Lee Dong-soo (KOR); Yoo Yong-sung (KOR)	15	15
3	Pramote Teerawiwatana (THA); Tesana Panvisvas (THA)	11	6
