= 1998 IBF World Junior Championships =

Tournament details
- Dates: 5 October 1998– 11 October 1998
- Edition: 4th
- Venue: Sports and Aquatic Centre
- Location: Melbourne, Australia

The 1998 IBF World Junior Championships was an international badminton tournament held in Melbourne, Australia from 5-11 October.

== Venue ==
This tournament was held in Sports and Aquatic Centre.

== Competition ==
=== Medalists ===
The table below gives an overview of the individual event medal winners at the 1998 World Junior Championships.

| Event | Gold | Silver | Bronze |
|---|---|---|---|
| Boys singles | (China) Zhang Yang | (Malaysia) Yeoh Kay Bin | (Indonesia) Arief Rasidi |
| Boys singles | (China) Zhang Yang | (Malaysia) Yeoh Kay Bin | (China) Chen Yu |
| Girls singles | (China) Gong Ruina | (China) Hu Ting | (China) Dong Fang |
| Girls singles | (China) Gong Ruina | (China) Hu Ting | (China) Rong Yi |
| Boys doubles | (Malaysia) Chan Chong Ming and Teo Kok Seng | (China) Jiang Shan and Cai Yun | (South Korea) Choi Min-ho and Jung Sung-gyun |
| Boys doubles | (Malaysia) Chan Chong Ming and Teo Kok Seng | (China) Jiang Shan and Cai Yun | (Thailand) Sudket Prapakamol and Patapol Ngernsrisuk |
| Girls doubles | (China) Zhang Jiewen and Xie Xingfang | (China) Gong Ruina and Huang Sui | (South Korea) Lee Hyo-jung and Jun Woul-sik |
| Girls doubles | (China) Zhang Jiewen and Xie Xingfang | (China) Gong Ruina and Huang Sui | (Indonesia) Vita Marissa and Eny Widiowati |
| Mixed doubles | (Malaysia) Chan Chong Ming and Joanne Quay | (South Korea) Choi Min-ho and Lee Hyo-jung | (China) Cai Yun and Xie Xingfang |
| Mixed doubles | (Malaysia) Chan Chong Ming and Joanne Quay | (South Korea) Choi Min-ho and Lee Hyo-jung | (China) Jiang Shan and Huang Sui |

== Results ==
=== Semifinals ===
| Category | Winner | Runner-up | Score |
|---|---|---|---|
| Boys' singles | (Malaysia) Yeoh Kay Bin | (China) Chen Yu | 15–12, 15–12 |
| Boys' singles | (China) Zhang Yang | (Indonesia) Arif Rasidi | 10–15, 15–4, 15–9 |
| Girls' singles | (China) Gong Ruina | (China) Dong Fang | 11–4, 11–8 |
| Girls' singles | (China) Hu Ting | (China) Rong Yi | 11–5, 11–4 |
| Boys' doubles | (Malaysia) Chan Chong Ming & Teo Kok Seng | (South Korea) Choi Min-ho & Jung Sung-gyun | 15–6, 15–5 |
| Boys' doubles | (China) Cai Yun & Jiang Shan | (Thailand) Patapol Ngernsrisuk & Sudket Prapakamol | 13–15, 15–2, 15–10 |
| Girls' doubles | (China) Xie Xingfang & Zhang Jiewen | (South Korea) Jun Woul-sik & Lee Hyo-jung | 17–16, 15–1 |
| Girls' doubles | (China) Gong Ruina & Huang Sui | (Indonesia) Vita Marissa & Eny Widiowati | 17–15, 15–13 |
| Mixed doubles | (South Korea) Choi Min-ho & Lee Hyo-jung | (China) Jiang Shan & Huang Sui | 15–12, 9–15, 15–0 |
| Mixed doubles | (Malaysia) Chan Chong Ming & Joanne Quay | (China) Cai Yun & Xie Xingfang | 15–4, 15–3 |

=== Finals ===
| Category | Winners | Runners-up | Score |
|---|---|---|---|
| Boys' singles | (China) Zhang Yang | (Malaysia) Yeoh Kay Bin | 15–10, 17–14 |
| Girls' singles | (China) Gong Ruina | (China) Hu Ting | 3–11, 13–10, 11–7 |
| Boys' doubles | (Malaysia) Chan Chong Ming & Teo Kok Seng | (China) Cai Yun & Jiang Shan | 15–7, 15–3 |
| Girls' doubles | (China) Xie Xingfang & Zhang Jiewen | (China) Gong Ruina & Huang Sui | 3–15, 15–13, 15–10 |
| Mixed doubles | (Malaysia) Chan Chong Ming & Joanne Quay | (South Korea) Choi Min-ho & Lee Hyo-jung | 15–6, 15–10 |

== Medal account ==
| Pos | Country | Gold | Silver | Bronze | Total |
|---|---|---|---|---|---|
| 1 | China | 3 | 3 | 5 | 11 |
| 2 | Malaysia | 2 | 1 | 0 | 3 |
| 3 | South Korea | 0 | 1 | 2 | 3 |
| 4 | Indonesia | 0 | 0 | 2 | 2 |
| 5 | Thailand | 0 | 0 | 1 | 1 |
