= Sri Lanka International =

Badminton championships

The Sri Lanka International in is an international badminton tournament held in Sri Lanka.

== Previous winners ==
=== Sri Lanka International Challenge ===
Year	Men's singles	Women's singles	Men's doubles	Women's doubles	Mixed doubles	Ref
2014	(South Korea) Lee Hyun-il	(India) P. C. Thulasi	(Singapore) Danny Bawa Chrisnanta (Singapore) Chayut Triyachart	(Thailand) Phataimas Muenwong (Thailand) Kilasu Ostermeyer	(India) Akshay Dewalkar (India) Pradnya Gadre	
2015	(India) B. Sai Praneeth	(Thailand) Supanida Katethong	(Malaysia) Koo Kien Keat (Malaysia) Tan Boon Heong	(Thailand) Chayanit Chaladchalam (Thailand) Phataimas Muenwong	(India) Arun Vishnu (India) Aparna Balan	
2016– 2023	No competition					
2024	(India) Kartikey Gulshan Kumar	(India) Isharani Baruah	(Indonesia) Rahmat Hidayat (Indonesia) Yeremia Rambitan	(Thailand) Pichamon Phatcharaphisutsin (Thailand) Nannapas Sukklad	(India) Ashith Surya (India) Amrutha Pramuthesh	
2025	(Malaysia) Aidil Sholeh	(Japan) Manami Suizu	(Indonesia) Raymond Indra (Indonesia) Nikolaus Joaquin	(Japan) Hina Osawa (Japan) Akari Sato	(Indonesia) Bobby Setiabudi (Indonesia) Melati Daeva Oktavianti	
2026	Cancelled					

=== Sri Lanka International Series ===
Year	Men's singles	Women's singles	Men's doubles	Women's doubles	Mixed doubles	Ref
1998	(India) Nikhil Kanetkar	(India) Aparna Popat	(South Korea) Choi Min-ho (South Korea) Jung Sung-gyun	(South Korea) Jun Woul-sik (South Korea) Lee Hyo-jung	(South Korea) Choi Min-ho (South Korea) Lee Hyo-jung	
1999– 2002	No competition					
2003	(Japan) Yousuke Nakanishi	(India) B. R. Meenakshi	(Japan) Shuichi Nakao (Japan) Shuichi Sakamoto	(China) Fan Jingjing (China) Liu Zhen	(Sri Lanka) Hemani Kaushali Dissanayake (Sri Lanka) Thushara Edirisinghe	
2004	No competition					
2005	(India) Chetan Anand	(Thailand) Sujitra Ekmongkolpaisarn	(Thailand) Siwath Khoosakunthum (Thailand) Nattapon Naktong	(India) B. R. Meenakshi (India) Trupti Murgunde	(Sri Lanka) Thushara Edirisinghe (Sri Lanka) N Palinda Halangoda	
2006	(Malaysia) Kenn Lim	(Malaysia) Julia Wong Pei Xian	(Malaysia) Chan Peng Soon (Malaysia) Chang Hun Ping	(India) Jwala Gutta (India) Shruti Kurien	(India) Chetan Anand (India) Jwala Gutta	
2007– 2023	No competition					
2024	(Canada) Xiaodong Sheng	(Indonesia) Ruzana	(Thailand) Sirawit Sothon (Thailand) Natthapat Trinkajee	(Thailand) Pichamon Phatcharaphisutsin (Thailand) Nannapas Sukklad	(Thailand) Phatharathorn Nipornram (Thailand) Nattamon Laisuan	
2025	(Indonesia) Jelang Fajar	(Thailand) Tidapron Kleebyeesun	(Malaysia) Bryan Goonting (Malaysia) Fazriq Razif	(Japan) Hina Osawa (Japan) Akari Sato	(Japan) Yuta Watanabe (Japan) Maya Taguchi	
2026	Cancelled					

== Performances by nation ==
=== Sri Lanka International Challenge ===
As of 2025 edition

Rank	Nation	MS	WS	MD	WD	XD	Total
1	India	2	2			3	7
2	Thailand		1		3		4
3	Indonesia			2		1	3
4	Japan		1		1		2
4	Malaysia	1		1			2
6	Singapore			1			1
6	South Korea	1					1
Total		4	4	4	4	4	20

=== Sri Lanka International Series ===
As of 2025 edition

Rank	Nation	MS	WS	MD	WD	XD	Total
1	India	2	2		2	1	7
2	Thailand		2	2	1	1	6
3	Japan	1		1	1	1	4
3	Malaysia	1	1	2			4
5	South Korea			1	1	1	3
6	Indonesia	1	1				2
6	Sri Lanka					2	2
8	Canada	1					1
8	China				1		1
Total		6	6	6	6	6	30
