= 2013 Sudirman Cup =

Tournament details
- Dates: 19–26 May
- Edition: 13th
- Level: International
- Venue: Putra Stadium, National Sports Complex
- Location: Kuala Lumpur, Malaysia

The 2013 Sudirman Cup was the thirteenth tournament of the Sudirman Cup. It was held from May 19–26, 2013 in Kuala Lumpur, Malaysia. According to the Badminton World Federation (BWF) 31 teams have confirmed their participation, for the second time, twelve teams competed in the elite group to battle for the title.

== Host city selection ==
Kuala Lumpur and Melbourne submitted bids for 2013 Sudirman Cup. On 9 December 2011, Badminton World Federation awarded the championships to Kuala Lumpur after Melbourne withdrew its bid and making Kuala Lumpur as the sole candidate.

== Seedings ==
The seedings for teams competing in the tournament were released on March 7, 2013. It was based on aggregated points from the best players in the world ranking. The tournament was divided into three groups (initially four groups, but because of South Africa withdrawn, Philippines and Kazakhstan redrawn to enter Groups 3), with twelve teams in the elite group competing for the title. Eight teams were seeded into second groups and ten teams were seeded into third groups. The draw was held on May 7, 2013.

=== Group 1 ===
1. China
2. Denmark
3. Malaysia
4. Thailand
5. Japan
6. South Korea
7. Indonesia
8. Germany
9. Chinese Taipei
10. India
11. Singapore
12. Hong Kong

=== Group 2 ===
13. Russia
14. Netherlands
15. France
16. USA
17. Sweden
18. Canada
19. Scotland
20. Austria

=== Group 3 ===
21. Ukraine
22. Switzerland
23. Vietnam
24. New Zealand
25. Turkey
26. Australia
27. Sri Lanka
28. Lithuania
29. Philippines
30. Kazakhstan

== Group 1 ==
=== Group stage ===
Qualified for quarterfinals
Play-offs

==== Group 1A ====
Team	Pts	Pld	W	L	MF	MA
China	2	2	2	0	10	0
Indonesia	1	2	1	1	4	6
India	0	2	0	2	1	9

May 19, 2013
China	5–0	India
May 20, 2013
Indonesia	4–1	India
May 21, 2013
China	5–0	Indonesia

==== Group 1B ====
Team	Pts	Pld	W	L	MF	MA
South Korea	2	2	2	0	9	1
Thailand	1	2	1	1	3	7
Hong Kong	0	2	0	2	3	7

May 19, 2013
Thailand	3–2	Hong Kong
May 20, 2013
South Korea	4–1	Hong Kong
May 21, 2013
Thailand	0–5	South Korea

==== Group 1C ====
Team	Pts	Pld	W	L	MF	MA
Chinese Taipei	2	2	2	0	8	2
Germany	1	2	1	1	3	7
Malaysia	0	2	0	2	4	6

May 19, 2013
Malaysia	2–3	Chinese Taipei
May 20, 2013
Germany	0–5	Chinese Taipei
May 21, 2013
Malaysia	2–3	Germany

==== Group 1D ====
Team	Pts	Pld	W	L	MF	MA
Japan	2	2	2	0	8	2
Denmark	1	2	1	1	6	4
Singapore	0	2	0	2	1	9

May 19, 2013
Denmark	4–1	Singapore
May 20, 2013
Japan	5–0	Singapore
May 21, 2013
Denmark	2–3	Japan

== Knockout stage ==
The draw for the quarterfinals was held after the completion of the final matches in the group stage on May 21, 2013.

=== Bracket ===
Quarterfinals
23 May
China	3
Indonesia	2
23 May
Chinese Taipei	0
Denmark	3
23 May
South Korea	3
Germany	0
23 May
Japan	1
Thailand	3

Semifinals
25 May
China	3
Denmark	1
25 May
South Korea	3
Thailand	1

Final
26 May
China	3
South Korea	0

==== Quarterfinal ====
China
3
Stadium Putra Court 2
23 May 2013
12:00

Indonesia
2

			1	2	3
1	(China) (Indonesia)	Xu Chen / Ma Jin; Tontowi Ahmad / Lilyana Natsir	18; 21	21; 14	16; 21
2	(China) (Indonesia)	Chen Long; Tommy Sugiarto	21; 11	21; 15
3	(China) (Indonesia)	Cai Yun / Fu Haifeng; Rian Agung Saputro / Angga Pratama	21; 19	18; 21	15; 21
4	(China) (Indonesia)	Li Xuerui; Lindaweni Fanetri	21; 16	21; 13
5	(China) (Indonesia)	Yu Yang / Wang Xiaoli; Lilyana Natsir / Nitya Krishinda Maheswari	21; 12	21; 19

Chinese Taipei
0
Stadium Putra Court 1
23 May 2013
18:00

Denmark
3

			1	2	3
1	(Chinese Taipei) (Denmark)	Chen Hung-ling / Cheng Wen-hsing; Joachim Fischer Nielsen / Christinna Pedersen	13; 21	16; 21
2	(Chinese Taipei) (Denmark)	Hsueh Hsuan-yi; Jan O Jorgensen	18; 21	21; 14	7; 21
3	(Chinese Taipei) (Denmark)	Lee Sheng-mu / Tsai Chia-hsin; Carsten Mogensen / Mathias Boe	18; 21	11; 21
4	(Chinese Taipei) (Denmark)	Tai Tzu-ying; Line Kjaersfeldt				not played
5	(Chinese Taipei) (Denmark)	Cheng Wen-hsing / Hsieh Pei-chen; Christinna Pedersen / Kamilla Rytter Juhl				not played

South Korea
3
Stadium Putra Court 1
23 May 2013
12:00

Germany
0

			1	2	3
1	(South Korea) (Germany)	Ko Sung-hyun / Kim Ha-na; Michael Fuchs / Birgit Michels	22; 24	21; 11	21; 13
2	(South Korea) (Germany)	Lee Dong-keun; Dieter Domke	21; 19	20; 22	21; 19
3	(South Korea) (Germany)	Ko Sung-hyun / Lee Yong-dae; Ingo Kindervater / Johannes Schoettler	21; 13	21; 10
4	(South Korea) (Germany)	Sung Ji-hyun; Olga Konon				not played
5	(South Korea) (Germany)	Kim Ha-na / Jung Kyung-eun; Birgit Michels / Johanna Goliszewski				not played

Japan
1
Stadium Putra Court 2
23 May 2013
18:00

Thailand
3

			1	2	3
1	(Japan) (Thailand)	Hirokatsu Hashimoto / Miyuki Maeda; Sudket Prapakamol / Saralee Thoungthongkam	19; 21	9; 21
2	(Japan) (Thailand)	Kenichi Tago; Tanongsak Saensomboonsuk	22; 20	21; 18
3	(Japan) (Thailand)	Hiroyuki Endo / Kenichi Hayakawa; Maneepong Jongjit / Nipitphon Puangpuapech	25; 27	16; 21
4	(Japan) (Thailand)	Sayaka Takahashi; Ratchanok Inthanon	19; 21	21; 9	19; 21
5	(Japan) (Thailand)	Misaki Matsutomo / Ayaka Takahashi; Saralee Thoungthongkam / Kunchala Voravichitchaikul				not played

==== Semifinal ====
China
3
Stadium Putra Court 1
25 May 2013
18:00

Denmark
1

			1	2	3
1	(China) (Denmark)	Zhang Nan / Zhao Yunlei; Joachim Fischer Nielsen / Christinna Pedersen	21; 15	21; 12
2	(China) (Denmark)	Chen Long; Jan O Jorgensen	21; 16	21; 16
3	(China) (Denmark)	Cai Yun / Fu Haifeng; Carsten Mogensen / Mathias Boe	16; 21	17; 21
4	(China) (Denmark)	Li Xuerui; Line Kjaersfeldt	21; 13	21; 9
5	(China) (Denmark)	Yu Yang / Wang Xiaoli; Kamilla Rytter Juhl / Christinna Pedersen				not played

South Korea
3
Stadium Putra Court 1
25 May 2013
12:00

Thailand
1

			1	2	3
1	(South Korea) (Thailand)	Ko Sung-hyun / Kim Ha-na; Sudket Prapakamol / Saralee Thoungthongkam	21; 18	21; 19
2	(South Korea) (Thailand)	Lee Dong-keun; Boonsak Ponsana	9; 21	12; 21
3	(South Korea) (Thailand)	Ko Sung-hyun / Lee Yong-dae; Maneepong Jongjit / Nipitphon Puangpuapech	21; 12	21; 11
4	(South Korea) (Thailand)	Sung Ji-hyun; Ratchanok Inthanon	21; 17	21; 14
5	(South Korea) (Thailand)	Jung Kyung-eun / Kim Ha-na; Saralee Thoungthongkam / Sapsiree Taerattanachai				not played

==== Final ====
China
3
Stadium Putra Court 1
26 May 2013
14:00

South Korea
0

			1	2	3
1	(China) (South Korea)	Xu Chen / Ma Jin; Ko Sung-hyun / Kim Ha-na	21; 13	21; 15
2	(China) (South Korea)	Chen Long; Lee Dong-keun	21; 15	21; 10
3	(China) (South Korea)	Liu Xiaolong / Qiu Zihan; Ko Sung-hyun / Lee Yong-dae	21; 19	21; 17
4	(China) (South Korea)	Li Xuerui; Sung Ji-hyun				not played
5	(China) (South Korea)	Yu Yang / Wang Xiaoli; Jung Kyung-eun / Kim Ha-na				not played

2013 Sudirman Cup champion

China
Ninth title

=== Play-offs ===
The draw for the Play-offs was held on May 30, 2013.

==== Bracket ====
Play-offs
10 June
Malaysia	3
Singapore	0
11 June
India	3
Hong Kong	2

Group 1
Advance to Group 1
Malaysia
India

•Singapore and Hong Kong are relegated to Group 2

== Group 2 ==
Qualified for Play-off Promotion
Play-offs Relegated

=== Group 2A ===
Team	Pts	Pld	W	L	MF	MA
Scotland	3	3	3	0	11	4
Russia	2	3	2	1	8	7
Sweden	1	3	1	2	7	8
United States	0	3	0	3	4	11

=== Group 2B ===
Team	Pts	Pld	W	L	MF	MA
Netherlands	3	3	3	0	13	2
France	2	3	2	1	9	6
Canada	1	3	1	2	7	8
Austria	0	3	0	3	1	14

=== Play-offs Promotion ===
==== Bracket ====
Semi-Finals
24 June
Scotland	3
France	1
24 June
Netherlands	0
Russia	3

Final
1 July
Scotland	2
Russia	3

Russia will be Promoted to Group 1

=== Play-offs Relegation ===
==== Bracket ====
Play-offs
27 June
United States	3
Austria	0

Austria will be relegated to Group 3

== Group 3 ==
=== Group 3A ===
Team	Pts	Pld	W	L	MF	MA
Ukraine	4	4	4	0	18	2
Philippines	3	4	3	1	9	11
New Zealand	2	4	2	2	8	12
Sri Lanka	1	4	1	3	8	12
Turkey	0	4	0	4	7	13

=== Group 3B ===
Team	Pts	Pld	W	L	MF	MA
Vietnam	4	4	4	0	17	3
Australia	3	4	3	1	13	7
Switzerland	2	4	2	2	14	6
Lithuania	1	4	1	3	5	15
Kazakhstan	0	4	0	4	1	19

=== Playoffs ===
Ukraine 1 - 3 Vietnam

Philippines 3 - 0 Australia

New Zealand2 - 3 Switzerland

Sri Lanka 3 - 1 Lithuania

Turkey 3 - 0 Kazakhstan

== Final standings ==
1. China
2. South Korea
3. Denmark
3. Thailand
5. Germany
5. Indonesia
5. Japan
5. Chinese Taipei
9. Hong Kong
9. India
9. Malaysia
9. Singapore
13. Russia
14. Scotland
15. Netherlands
16. France
17. Sweden
18. Canada
19. United States
20. Austria
21. Vietnam
22. Ukraine
23. Philippines
24. Australia
25. Switzerland
26. New Zealand
27. Sri Lanka
28. Lithuania
29. Turkey
30. Kazakhstan
