= Jiang Shan (badminton) =

Chinese badminton player

Jiang Shan 江山
Personal information
- Born: 1980 (age 45–46) Guangxi, China
- Height: 1.77 m (5 ft 10 in)

Sport
- Country: China
- Sport: Badminton
- Handedness: Right
- Event: Men's & mixed doubles

Men's & mixed doubles
- BWF profile
Medal record
Men's badminton
Representing China
World Junior Championships
Silver medal – second place	1998 Melbourne	Boys' doubles
Bronze medal – third place	1998 Melbourne	Mixed doubles
Asian Junior Championships
Gold medal – first place	1998 Kuala Lumpur	Mixed doubles
Gold medal – first place	1998 Kuala Lumpur	Boys' team
Gold medal – first place	1997 Manila	Boys' team
Silver medal – second place	1998 Kuala Lumpur	Boys' doubles
Bronze medal – third place	1997 Manila	Mixed doubles

Jiang Shan (Chinese: 江山, born 1980) is a former Chinese badminton player. Jiang played for the Guangxi team in the national event, and was the runner-up in the men's doubles event at the National Championships tournament. He was the silver and bronze medalists at the 1998 IBF World Junior Championships in the boys' and mixed doubles event respectively. Jiang competed at the 1997 Asian Junior Championships, winning a gold in the boys' team and a bronze in the mixed doubles event. He also captured two gold medals in 1998, in the boys' team and mixed doubles event, and a silver medal in the boys' doubles.

== Achievements ==
=== World Junior Championships ===
Boys' doubles
Year	Venue	Partner	Opponent	Score	Result
1998	Sports and Aquatic Centre; Melbourne, Australia	(China) Cai Yun	(Malaysia) Chan Chong Ming (Malaysia) Teo Kok Seng	7–15, 3–15	Bronze

Mixed doubles
Year	Venue	Partner	Opponent	Score	Result
1998	Sports and Aquatic Centre; Melbourne, Australia	(China) Huang Sui	(South Korea) Choi Min-ho (South Korea) Lee Hyo-jung	11–15, 6–15	Bronze

=== Asian Junior Championships ===
Boys' doubles
Year	Venue	Partner	Opponent	Score	Result
1998	Kuala Lumpur Badminton Stadium; Kuala Lumpur, Malaysia	(China) Guo Siwei	(Malaysia) Chan Chong Ming (Malaysia) Teo Kok Seng	7–15, 5–15	Silver

Mixed doubles
Year	Venue	Partner	Opponent	Score	Result
1998	Kuala Lumpur Badminton Stadium; Kuala Lumpur, Malaysia	(China) Huang Sui	(Malaysia) Chan Chong Ming (Malaysia) Joanne Quay	6–15, 15–8, 15–11	Gold
1997	Ninoy Aquino Stadium; Manila, Philippines	(China) Gong Ruina	(China) Cheng Rui (China) Gao Ling	6–15, 5–15	Bronze

=== IBF International ===
Men's doubles
Year	Tournament	Partner	Opponent	Score	Result
2001	China Satellite	(China) Yang Ming	(China) Ge Cheng (China) Tao Xiaoqiang	6–15, 10–15	(silver) Runner-up
