= Allan Tai =

Malaysian badminton player (born 1980)

Allan Tai 戴毓伦
Personal information
- Born: 29 January 1980 (age 46) Kuala Lumpur, Malaysia

Sport
- Country: Malaysia
- Sport: Badminton
- Handedness: Left
- Event: Men's singles

Men's singles
- BWF profile
Medal record
Men's badminton
Representing Malaysia
Asian Junior Championships
Silver medal – second place	1998 Kuala Lumpur	Boys' team

Allan Tai (born 29 January 1980) is a Malaysian former badminton player. He was part of the Malaysia junior team that won the silver medal at the 1998 Asian Junior Championships in the boys' team event. In 2001, Tai became the finalist at the India Satellite tournament, and in 2002, he won the Smiling Fish Satellite tournament in Thailand. The Kuala Lumpur borned, was the champion of the Asiatic Indahpura Badminton Championship in 2006 and 2007.

== Achievements ==
=== IBF International ===
Men's singles

Year	Tournament	Opponent	Score	Result
2002	Smiling Fish satellite	(Singapore) Hendra Wijaya	7–4, 8–7, 7–5	(gold) Winner
2001	India Satellite	(India) Chetan Anand	11–15, 7–15	(silver) Runner-up
