= Joanne Quay =

Malaysian badminton player

Joanne Quay 郭瑞玲
Personal information
- Born: Quay Swee Ling; 17 March 1980 (age 46)
- Height: 1.66 m (5 ft 5 in)

Sport
- Country: Malaysia
- Sport: Badminton
- Handedness: Right
- Event: Women's & mixed doubles

Women's & mixed doubles
- BWF profile
Medal record
Women's badminton
Representing Malaysia
Commonwealth Games
Silver medal – second place	1998 Kuala lumpur	Women's team
Asian Championships
Bronze medal – third place	2006 Johor Bahru	Women's doubles
Southeast Asian Games
Bronze medal – third place	2001 Kuala Lumpur	Women's team
Bronze medal – third place	1999 Bandar Seri Begawan	Women's team
World Junior Championships
Gold medal – first place	1998 Melbourne	Mixed doubles
Asian Junior Championships
Silver medal – second place	1998 Kuala Lumpur	Mixed doubles

Joanne Quay Swee Ling (born 17 March 1980) is a Malaysian former badminton player. Quay was the gold medalist at the 1998 World Junior Championships in the mixed doubles event partnered with Chan Chong Ming. She and Chan also won the silver medal in Asian Junior Championships. She was part of the national team that won the women's team silver medal at the 1998 Commonwealth Games. Quay left the Badminton Association of Malaysia in 2004 and joined the Kuala Lumpur Racquet Club (KLRC). She then went on to study at the Leeds Metropolitan University majoring in sports business management. As a Leeds Met Carnegie, she took part in badminton competition, and at the 2009 BUCS Championships, she won double titles in the women's and mixed doubles event. Quay now works as BAM's high performance manager.

== Achievements ==
=== Asian Championships ===
Women's doubles
Year	Venue	Partner	Opponent	Score	Result
2006	Bandaraya Stadium; Johor Bahru, Malaysia	(Malaysia) Lim Pek Siah	(Chinese Taipei) Chien Yu-chin (Chinese Taipei) Cheng Wen-hsing	9–21, 15–21	Bronze

=== World Junior Championships ===
Mixed doubles
Year	Venue	Partner	Opponent	Score	Result
1998	Sports and Aquatic Centre; Melbourne, Australia	(Malaysia) Chan Chong Ming	(South Korea) Choi Min-ho (South Korea) Lee Hyo-jung	15–6, 15–10	Gold

=== Asian Junior Championships ===
Girls' doubles
Year	Venue	Partner	Opponent	Score	Result
1998	Kuala Lumpur Badminton Stadium; Kuala Lumpur, Malaysia	(Malaysia) Chan Chong Ming	(China) Jiang Shan (China) Huang Sui	15–6, 8–15, 11–15	Silver

=== IBF World Grand Prix ===
The World Badminton Grand Prix sanctioned by International Badminton Federation (IBF) since 1983.

Women's doubles
Year	Tournament	Partner	Opponent	Score	Result
2006	New Zealand Open	(Malaysia) Lim Pek Siah	(Singapore) Jiang Yanmei (Singapore) Li Yujia	11–21, 21–19, 15–21	(silver) Runner-up

Mixed doubles
Year	Tournament	Partner	Opponent	Score	Result
1999	Hong Kong Open	(Malaysia) Chan Chong Ming	(China) Guo Siwei (China) Chen Lin	15–11, 15–8	(gold) Winner

=== BWF International Challenge/Series ===
Women's doubles
Year	Tournament	Partner	Opponent	Score	Result
2010	Welsh International	(Malaysia) Anita Raj Kaur	(Sweden) Louise Eriksson (Sweden) Amanda Wallin	21–13, 21–11	(gold) Winner
2009	Welsh International	(Malaysia) Anita Raj Kaur	(Russia) Valeria Sorokina (Russia) Nina Vislova	14–21, 16–21	(silver) Runner-up
1999	Western Australia International	(Malaysia) Lim Pek Siah	(Australia) Rhonda Cator (Australia) Amanda Hardy	15–9, 15–9	(gold) Winner
1998	Malaysia Satellite	(Malaysia) Norhasikin Amin	(Malaysia) Ishwarii Boopathy (Malaysia) Woon Sze Mei	13–15, 15–11, 17–14	(gold) Winner

Mixed doubles
Year	Tournament	Partner	Opponent	Score	Result
2006	Australian International	(New Zealand) Daniel Shirley	(New Zealand) Craig Cooper (New Zealand) Renee Flavell	21–10, 21–19	(gold) Winner
2000	French International	(Malaysia) Chan Chong Ming	(Malaysia) Pang Cheh Chang (Malaysia) Lim Pek Siah	17–14, 15–2	(gold) Winner
1999	Western Australia International	(Malaysia) Chan Chong Ming	(Malaysia) Pang Cheh Chang (Malaysia) Lim Pek Siah	8–15, 15–11, 6–15	(silver) Runner-up
1999	Singapore Sateliite	(Malaysia) Chan Chong Ming	(Malaysia) Pang Cheh Chang (Malaysia) Lim Pek Siah	4–15, 15–7, 3–15	(silver) Runner-up
1997	Malaysia International	(Malaysia) Rosman Razak	(Malaysia) Chew Choon Eng (Malaysia) Norhasikin Amin	15–9, 15–4	(gold) Winner

BWF International Challenge tournament
BWF International Series tournament
BWF Future Series tournament
