= 1998 Asian Junior Badminton Championships =

Tournament details
- Dates: 15-21 June 1998
- Edition: 2
- Venue: Kuala Lumpur Badminton Stadium
- Location: Kuala Lumpur, Malaysia

The 1998 Asian Junior Badminton Championships is an Asia continental junior championships to crown the best U-19 badminton players across Asia. This tournament were held at the Kuala Lumpur Badminton Stadium, in Kuala Lumpur, Malaysia from 15-21 June 1998.

== Medalists ==
China boys' and girls' team sweep the title after beat Malaysia 3–2 and South Korea 5–0 respectively. The Indonesian and Taiwanese boys' and girls' finished in third place. In the individuals event, Chien Yu-hsiu surprised the competition when he captured the boys' singles gold. China led by top-seed Zhang Yi, Indonesia, Korea and Malaysia were among the favourites to go home with the coveted title. In the girls' singles, China dominated event from the quarterfinals. Hu Ting won the girls' singles title after beat her teammate Gong Ruina, 11–6 and 11–2, but Gong who was partnered with Huang Sui won the girls' doubles title after defeat the Korean pair Lee Hyo-jung and Jun Woul-sihk, 15–13 and 15–8. Huang completes her success by winning her second title in the mixed doubles event with Jiang Shan. The boys' doubles gold goes to Chan Chong Ming and Teo Kok Seng of Malaysia.

Event	Gold	Silver	Bronze
Boys' teams	China; Cai Yun; Chen Yu; Guo Siwei; Jiang Shan; Sang Yang; Xiao Li; Zhang Qirong; Zhang Yi	Malaysia; Sairul Amar Ayob; Chan Chong Ming; Alvin Chew; Charles Khoo; Ong Huck Lee; Allan Tai; Tan Wei Ming; Teo Kok Seng; Yeoh Kay Bin	Indonesia; Endra Feryanto; Hariawan; Donny Prasetyo; Arif Rasidi; Hendri Kurniawan Saputra; Wandry Kurniawan Saputra; Denny Setiawan; Imam Sodikin
Boys' teams	China; Cai Yun; Chen Yu; Guo Siwei; Jiang Shan; Sang Yang; Xiao Li; Zhang Qirong; Zhang Yi	Malaysia; Sairul Amar Ayob; Chan Chong Ming; Alvin Chew; Charles Khoo; Ong Huck Lee; Allan Tai; Tan Wei Ming; Teo Kok Seng; Yeoh Kay Bin	Chinese Taipei; Chen Chun-chi; Chen Huang-ming; Chien Yu-hsiu; Hang Kuang-jong; Lee Hsun-neng; Tseng Chun-lin
Girls' teams	China; Dong Fang; Gong Ruina; Hu Ting; Huang Sui; Jin Beilei; Rong Yi; Wei Yan; Xie Xingfang	South Korea; Jun Jae-youn; Jun Woul-sihk; Lee Hyo-jung; Lee Ji-sun; Lee Joon-boon	Indonesia; Siang Chiung; Puspa Dewi; Eny Erlangga; Ernita; Vita Marissa; Dwi Ratna; Atu Rosalina; Eny Widiowati
Girls' teams	China; Dong Fang; Gong Ruina; Hu Ting; Huang Sui; Jin Beilei; Rong Yi; Wei Yan; Xie Xingfang	South Korea; Jun Jae-youn; Jun Woul-sihk; Lee Hyo-jung; Lee Ji-sun; Lee Joon-boon	Chinese Taipei; Chen Hsiu-lin; Chen Wan-ju; Cheng Wen-hsing; Chien Yu-chin; Kung Ya-tzu; Lin Hsiao-hui; Teng Tao-chun; Yang Ling-hui
Boys' singles	(Chinese Taipei) Chien Yu-hsiu	(Indonesia) Endra Feryanto	(South Korea) Lee Hyun-il
Boys' singles	(Chinese Taipei) Chien Yu-hsiu	(Indonesia) Endra Feryanto	(South Korea) Shon Seung-mo
Girls' singles	(China) Hu Ting	(China) Gong Ruina	(China) Rong Yi
Girls' singles	(China) Hu Ting	(China) Gong Ruina	(China) Dong Fang
Boys' doubles	(Malaysia) Chan Chong Ming (Malaysia) Teo Kok Seng	(China) Guo Siwei (China) Jiang Shan	(Thailand) Patapol Ngernsrisuk (Thailand) Sudket Prapakamol
Boys' doubles	(Malaysia) Chan Chong Ming (Malaysia) Teo Kok Seng	(China) Guo Siwei (China) Jiang Shan	(Indonesia) Donny Prasetyo (Indonesia) Denny Setiawan
Girls' doubles	(China) Gong Ruina (China) Huang Sui	(South Korea) Lee Hyo-jung (South Korea) Jun Woul-sihk	(Indonesia) Vita Marissa (Indonesia) Eny Widowati
Girls' doubles	(China) Gong Ruina (China) Huang Sui	(South Korea) Lee Hyo-jung (South Korea) Jun Woul-sihk	(China) Dong Fang (China) Xie Xingfang
Mixed doubles	(China) Jiang Shan (China) Huang Sui	(Malaysia) Chan Chong Ming (Malaysia) Joanne Quay	(Indonesia) Denny Setiawan (Indonesia) Puspa Dewi
Mixed doubles	(China) Jiang Shan (China) Huang Sui	(Malaysia) Chan Chong Ming (Malaysia) Joanne Quay	(China) Chen Yu (China) Jin Beilei

== Results ==
=== Semifinals ===
Category	Winner	Runner-up	Score
Boys' singles	(Indonesia) Endra Feryanto	(South Korea) Lee Hyun-il	15–8, 15–5
Boys' singles	(Chinese Taipei) Chien Yu-hsiu	(South Korea) Shon Seung-mo	15–6, 15–4
Girls' singles	(China) Hu Ting	(China) Dong Fang	11–6, 11–3
Girls' singles	(China) Gong Ruina	(China) Rong Yi	7–5^{r}
Boys' doubles	(Malaysia) Chan Chong Ming (Malaysia) Teo Kok Seng	(Thailand) Patapol Ngernsrisuk (Thailand) Sudket Prapakamol	15–11, 15–9
Boys' doubles	(China) Guo Siwei (China) Jiang Shan	(Indonesia) Denny Setiawan (Indonesia) Donny Prasetyo	15–9, 15–8
Girls' doubles	(South Korea) Lee Hyo-jung (South Korea) Jun Woul-sihk	(China) Dong Fang (China) Xie Xingfang	15–3, 15–8
Girls' doubles	(China) Gong Ruina (China) Huang Sui	(Indonesia) Eny Widiowati (Indonesia) Vita Marissa	17–16, 17–15
Mixed doubles	(China) Jiang Shan (China) Huang Sui	(Indonesia) Denny Setiawan (Indonesia) Puspa Dewi	15–1, 15–2
Mixed doubles	(Malaysia) Chan Chong Ming (Malaysia) Joanne Quay	(China) Chen Yu (China) Jin Beilei	15–5, 15–5

=== Finals ===
Category	Winners	Runners-up	Score
Boys' singles	(Chinese Taipei) Chien Yu-hsiu	(Indonesia) Endra Feryanto	15–1, 15–1
Girls' singles	(China) Hu Ting	(China) Gong Ruina	11–6, 11–2
Boys' doubles	(Malaysia) Chan Chong Ming (Malaysia) Teo Kok Seng	(China) Guo Siwei (China) Jiang Shan	15–7, 15–5
Girls' doubles	(China) Gong Ruina (China) Huang Sui	(South Korea) Lee Hyo-jung (South Korea) Jun Woul-sihk	15–13, 15–8
Mixed doubles	(China) Jiang Shan (China) Huang Sui	(Malaysia) Chan Chong Ming (Malaysia) Joanne Quay	6–15, 15–8, 15–11

== Medal table ==
Rank	Nation	Gold	Silver	Bronze	Total
1	China (CHN)	5	2	4	11
2	Malaysia (MAS)	1	2	0	3
3	Chinese Taipei (TPE)	1	0	2	3
4	South Korea (KOR)	0	2	2	4
5	Indonesia (INA)	0	1	5	6
6	Thailand (THA)	0	0	1	1
Totals (6 entries)		7	7	14	28
