= Jun Woul-sik =

South Korean badminton player (born 1980)

Personal information
- Born: 20 July 1980 (age 46)
- Height: 1.66 m (5 ft 5 in)

Sport
- Country: South Korea
- Sport: Badminton
- Handedness: Right
- Event: Women's & mixed doubles

Women's & mixed doubles
- BWF profile
Medal record
Women's badminton
Representing South Korea
World Junior Championships
Bronze medal – third place	1998 Melbourne	Girls' doubles
Asian Junior Championships
Silver medal – second place	1998 Kuala Lumpur	Girls' doubles
Silver medal – second place	1998 Kuala Lumpur	Girls' team

Jun Woul-sik (Korean: 전월식; born 20 July 1980) is a former South Korean badminton player.

Jun was educated at the Seongil Girls' High School. She was part of the national junior team that won the girls' team silver medal at the 1998 Asian Junior Championships, and claimed the individual girls' doubles silver partnered with Lee Hyo-jung. She and Lee also captured the girls' doubles bronze at the World Junior Championships in Australia. Jun won the senior international tournament at the 1997 South Korea and 1998 Sri Lanka International. She also won the women's doubles title at the 2005 Canadian International partnered with Ra Kyung-min.

Jun played for the Daekyo Corporation in the national event, and was the runner-up in the mixed doubles, and the semi-finalist in the women's doubles event at the 2004 National Championships in Seoul. She graduated from the Busan University of Foreign Studies.

== Achievements ==
=== World Junior Championships ===
Girls' doubles
Year	Venue	Partner	Opponent	Score	Result
1998	Sports and Aquatic Centre; Melbourne, Australia	(South Korea) Lee Hyo-jung	(China) Zhang Jiewen (China) Xie Xingfang	16–17, 1–15	Bronze

=== Asian Junior Championships ===
Girls' doubles
Year	Venue	Partner	Opponent	Score	Result
1998	Kuala Lumpur Badminton Stadium; Kuala Lumpur, Malaysia	(South Korea) Lee Hyo-jung	(China) Gong Ruina (China) Huang Sui	13–15, 8–15	Silver

=== IBF International ===
Women's doubles
Year	Tournament	Partner	Opponent	Score	Result
2005	Canadian International	(South Korea) Ra Kyung-min	(South Korea) Ha Jung-eun (South Korea) Oh Seul-ki	15–5, 15–9	(gold) Winner
1998	Sri Lanka International	(South Korea) Lee Hyo-jung	(India) Madhumita Bisht (India) Sindhu Gulati	15–10, 15–5	(gold) Winner
1997	Korea International	(South Korea) Lee Hyo-jung	(South Korea) Choi Young-eun (South Korea) Lee Ji-sun	15–5, 15–9	(gold) Winner

Mixed doubles
Year	Tournament	Partner	Opponent	Score	Result
1998	Sri Lanka International	(South Korea) Jung Sung-gyun	(South Korea) Choi Min-ho (South Korea) Lee Hyo-jung	13–15, 15–17	(silver) Runner-up
