= Chan Chong Ming =

Malaysian badminton player

Chan Chong Ming 陈重名
Personal information
- Born: 16 February 1980 (age 46) Kuala Selangor, Selangor, Malaysia
- Height: 1.71 m (5 ft 7 in)
- Weight: 68 kg (150 lb)

Sport
- Country: Malaysia
- Sport: Badminton
- Handedness: Left

Men's doubles
- Career title: 13
- Highest ranking: 1 (11 April 2002)
- BWF profile
Medal record
Men's badminton
Representing Malaysia
World Championships
Bronze medal – third place	2001 Seville	Men's doubles
Bronze medal – third place	2005 Anaheim	Men's doubles
Thomas Cup
Silver medal – second place	2002 Guangzhou	Men's team
Bronze medal – third place	2006 Sendai/Tokyo	Men's team
Commonwealth Games
Gold medal – first place	2002 Manchester	Men's doubles
Gold medal – first place	2006 Melbourne	Men's doubles
Gold medal – first place	2006 Melbourne	Mixed team
Asian Games
Bronze medal – third place	1998 Bangkok	Men's team
Bronze medal – third place	2002 Busan	Men's doubles
Bronze medal – third place	2002 Busan	Men's team
Asian Championships
Bronze medal – third place	2004 Kuala Lumpur	Men's doubles
SEA Games
Gold medal – first place	2001 Kuala Lumpur	Men's team
Gold medal – first place	2005 Manila	Men's team
Bronze medal – third place	2001 Kuala Lumpur	Men's doubles
Bronze medal – third place	2005 Manila	Men's doubles
World Junior Championships
Gold medal – first place	1996 Silkeborg	Boys' doubles
Gold medal – first place	1998 Melbourne	Boys' doubles
Gold medal – first place	1998 Melbourne	Mixed doubles
Asian Junior Championships
Gold medal – first place	1997 Manila	Boys' doubles
Gold medal – first place	1998 Kuala Lumpur	Boys' doubles
Silver medal – second place	1997 Manila	Mixed doubles
Silver medal – second place	1998 Kuala Lumpur	Mixed doubles
Silver medal – second place	1998 Kuala Lumpur	Boys' team
Bronze medal – third place	1997 Manila	Boys' team

Chan Chong Ming
- Traditional Chinese: 陳重名
- Simplified Chinese: 陈重名
Transcriptions
Standard Mandarin
- Hanyu Pinyin: Chén Zhóngmíng

Chan Chong Ming AMN (born 16 February 1980) is a Malaysian former badminton player and a current head coach of Malaysian national women's doubles squad. He is two-time Commonwealth Games gold medalists in the men's doubles, winning the title in 2002 and 2006. Chan also won the men's doubles bronze medals at the World Championships in 2001 and 2005; in the Asian Games in 2002; Asian Championships in 2004; and at the SEA Games in 2001 and 2005. He also helps the national team win the mixed team title at the Commonwealth Games in 2006, and the men's team title at the SEA Games in 2001 and 2005. Chan reached a career high as world number 1 in the men's doubles in April 2002.

== Career ==
Chan competed in badminton at the 2004 Summer Olympics with his then partner, Chew Choon Eng. In the first round, they defeated Theodoros Velkos and George Patis of Greece, but were then defeated in the round of 16 by Zheng Bo and Sang Yang of the China.

After his unsuccessful outing in the Olympic Games, Chan's regular doubles partner was changed to Koo Kien Keat. Together, they claimed 2005 Denmark Open title. Chan Chong Ming and Koo Kien Keat won the Malaysia Open in 2006 which was held in Kuching, Sarawak and became the new hope for Malaysia in the men's doubles. However, at the 2006 World Championships, they conceded a walkover due to Chan's father's death. In the Swiss Open, Chan and Koo defeated Carsten Mogensen and Mathias Boe in a thrilling 17–14, 8-15, and 17–14 final match. On the run up to the Doha Asian Games XV, Chan sustained an injury which prompted their coach, Rexy Mainaky, to split them, partnering Koo Kien Keat with Tan Boon Heong for the games instead. Chan and Koo's partnership ended when Koo won the title with his new partner.

Chan's partner was changed to Hoon Thien How who was Tan Boon Heong's ex-partner. Chan and Hoon won the Kuala Lumpur Open at the end of 2006. Chan and Hoon Thien How won their first title in New Zealand after beating Johan Wiratama and Albertus Njoto of Hong Kong.

Chan paired again with Chew. In the late 2008, Chan established a company named Pioneer Sdn Bhd with Wong Choong Hann, Choong Tan Fook, Lee Wan Wah and Chew Choon Eng. They trained young players in the two centres in Kota Damansara and Bandar Mahkota Cheras. Chan married Janice Lee on 6 January 2008.

== Achievements ==
=== World Championships ===
Men's doubles
Year	Venue	Partner	Opponent	Score	Result
2001	Palacio de Deportes de San Pablo; Seville, Spain	(Malaysia) Chew Choon Eng	(Indonesia) Tony Gunawan (Indonesia) Halim Haryanto	15–12, 5–15, 3–15	Bronze
2005	Arrowhead Pond; Anaheim, United States	(Malaysia) Koo Kien Keat	(Indonesia) Sigit Budiarto (Indonesia) Candra Wijaya	9–15, 11–15	Bronze

=== Commonwealth Games ===
Men's doubles
Year	Venue	Partner	Opponent	Score	Result
2002	Bolton Arena; Manchester, England	(Malaysia) Chew Choon Eng	(Malaysia) Chang Kim Wai (Malaysia) Choong Tan Fook	7–5, 4–7, 2–7, 7–5, 7–3	Gold
2006	Melbourne Convention and Exhibition Centre; Melbourne, Australia	(Malaysia) Koo Kien Keat	(Malaysia) Choong Tan Fook (Malaysia) Wong Choong Hann	21–13, 21–14	Gold

=== Asian Games ===
Men's doubles
Year	Venue	Partner	Opponent	Score	Result
2002	Gangseo Gymnasium; Busan, South Korea	(Malaysia) Chew Choon Eng	(South Korea) Lee Dong-soo (South Korea) Yoo Yong-sung	16–17, 12–15	Bronze

=== Asian Championships ===
Men's doubles
Year	Venue	Partner	Opponent	Score	Result
2004	Kuala Lumpur Badminton Stadium; Kuala Lumpur, Malaysia	(Malaysia) Chew Choon Eng	(Indonesia) Sigit Budiarto (Indonesia) Tri Kusharjanto	8–15, 9–15	Bronze

=== Southeast Asian Games ===
Men's doubles
Year	Venue	Partner	Opponent	Score	Result
2001	Malawati Stadium; Selangor, Malaysia	(Malaysia) Chew Choon Eng	(Indonesia) Tony Gunawan (Indonesia) Bambang Suprianto	15–9, 3–15, 4–15	Bronze
2005	PhilSports Arena; Metro Manila, Philippines	(Malaysia) Koo Kien Keat	(Indonesia) Markis Kido (Indonesia) Hendra Setiawan	13–15, 13–15	Bronze

=== World Junior Championships ===
Boys' doubles
Year	Venue	Partner	Opponent	Score	Result
1996	Jysk Arena; Silkeborg, Denmark	(Malaysia) Jeremy Gan	(Chinese Taipei) Chien Yu-hsiu (Chinese Taipei) Huang Shih-chung	18–17, 15–7	Gold
1998	Sports and Aquatic Centre; Melbourne, Australia	(Malaysia) Teo Kok Seng	(China) Jiang Shan (China) Cai Yun	15–7, 15–3	Gold

Mixed doubles
Year	Venue	Partner	Opponent	Score	Result
1998	Sports and Aquatic Centre; Melbourne, Australia	(Malaysia) Joanne Quay	(South Korea) Choi Min-ho (South Korea) Lee Hyo-jung	15–6, 15–10	Gold

=== Asian Junior Championships ===
Boys' doubles
Year	Venue	Partner	Opponent	Score	Result
1997	Ninoy Aquino Stadium; Manila, Philippines	(Malaysia) Jeremy Gan	(China) Cai Yun (China) Zhang Yi	15–6, 15–3	Gold
1998	Kuala Lumpur Badminton Stadium; Kuala Lumpur, Malaysia	(Malaysia) Teo Kok Seng	(China) Jiang Shan (China) Guo Siwei	15–7, 15–5	Gold

Mixed doubles
Year	Venue	Partner	Opponent	Score	Result
1997	Ninoy Aquino Stadium; Manila, Philippines	(Malaysia) Lim Pek Siah	(China) Cheng Rui (China) Gao Ling	7–15, 9–15	Silver
1998	Kuala Lumpur Badminton Stadium; Kuala Lumpur, Malaysia	(Malaysia) Joanne Quay	(China) Jiang Shan (China) Huang Sui	15–6, 8–15, 11–15	Silver

=== IBF World Grand Prix ===
The World Badminton Grand Prix sanctioned by International Badminton Federation (IBF) since 1983 to 2006. The BWF Grand Prix has two levels, the Grand Prix Gold and Grand Prix. It is a series of badminton tournaments, sanctioned by the Badminton World Federation (BWF) from 2007 to 2017.

Men's doubles
Year	Tournament	Partner	Opponent	Score	Result
2002	Japan Open	(Malaysia) Chew Choon Eng	(Malaysia) Choong Tan Fook (Malaysia) Lee Wan Wah	Walkover	(gold) Winner
2002	Denmark Open	(Malaysia) Chew Choon Eng	(South Korea) Ha Tae-kwon (South Korea) Kim Dong-moon	4–15, 8–15	(silver) Runner-up
2002	China Open	(Malaysia) Chew Choon Eng	(Thailand) Pramote Teerawiwatana (Thailand) Tesana Panvisvas	8–15, 8–15	(silver) Runner-up
2004	Chinese Taipei Open	(Malaysia) Koo Kien Keat	(Indonesia) Hendra Aprida Gunawan (Indonesia) Joko Riyadi	6–15, 15–13, 15–6	(gold) Winner
2005	Denmark Open	(Malaysia) Koo Kien Keat	(Denmark) Lars Paaske (Denmark) Jonas Rasmussen	15–6, 15–7	(gold) Winner
2006	Swiss Open	(Malaysia) Koo Kien Keat	(Denmark) Mathias Boe (Denmark) Carsten Mogensen	17–14, 8–15, 17–14	(gold) Winner
2006	Malaysia Open	(Malaysia) Koo Kien Keat	(Malaysia) Mohd Fairuzizuan Tazari (Malaysia) Lin Woon Fui	14–21, 21–11, 21–17	(gold) Winner
2007	New Zealand Open	(Malaysia) Hoon Thien How	(Hong Kong) Albert Susanto Njoto (Hong Kong) Yohan Hadikusuma Wiratama	21–14, 20–22, 21–11	(gold) Winner
2008	India Open	(Malaysia) Chew Choon Eng	(China) Guo Zhendong (China) Xie Zhongbo	21–19, 14–21, 12–21	(silver) Runner-up

Mixed doubles
Year	Tournament	Partner	Opponent	Score	Result
1999	Hong Kong Open	(Malaysia) Joanne Quay	(China) Guo Siwei (China) Chen Lin	15–11, 15–8	(gold) Winner

BWF Grand Prix Gold tournament
BWF Grand Prix tournament

== Honour ==
- Malaysia
  - Member of the Order of the Defender of the Realm (A.M.N.) (2006)
