= Choi Min-ho (badminton) =

South Korean badminton player (born 1980)

Personal information
- Born: 27 June 1980 (age 46)
- Height: 1.72 m (5 ft 8 in)

Sport
- Country: South Korea
- Sport: Badminton
- Handedness: Right
- Event: Men's & mixed doubles

Men's & mixed doubles
- BWF profile
Medal record
Men's badminton
Representing South Korea
World Junior Championships
Silver medal – second place	1998 Melbourne	Mixed doubles
Bronze medal – third place	1998 Melbourne	Boys' doubles

Choi Min-ho (Korean: 최민호; born 27 June 1980) is a South Korean badminton player. Cho, who was educated at Icheon High School, competed at the 1998 World Junior Championships, winning a silver in the mixed doubles and a bronze in the boys' doubles events. At the young age, Choi clinched his first senior international tournament title at the 1997 Korea International in the mixed doubles event, partnering with Lee Hyo-jung. He won double titles at the 1998 Sri Lanka International, winning the men's and mixed doubles event.

Choi trained at the Gimcheon city, graduated from the Inha University, and was a former South Korea national team coach.

In February 2022, Choi was hired to join Chinese national team coaching staff as men's double coach alongside fellow South Korean Coach Kang, who extended his contract as women's double coach.

== Achievements ==
=== World Junior Championships ===
Boys' doubles
Year	Venue	Partner	Opponent	Score	Result
1998	Sports and Aquatic Centre; Melbourne, Australia	(South Korea) Jung Sung-gyun	(Malaysia) Chan Chong Ming (Malaysia) Teo Kok Seng	6–15, 5–15	Bronze

Mixed doubles
Year	Venue	Partner	Opponent	Score	Result
1998	Sports and Aquatic Centre; Melbourne, Australia	(South Korea) Lee Hyo-jung	(Malaysia) Chan Chong Ming (Malaysia) Joanne Quay	6–15, 10–15	Silver

=== BWF International Challenge/Series ===
Men's doubles
Year	Tournament	Partner	Opponent	Score	Result
2007	Korea International	(South Korea) Hong In-pyo	(South Korea) Ko Sung-hyun (South Korea) Kwon Yi-goo	10–21, 13–21	(silver) Runner-up
1998	Sri Lanka International	(South Korea) Jung Sung-gyun	(India) Markose Bristow (India) George Thomas	15–13, 15–12	(gold) Winner

Mixed doubles
Year	Tournament	Partner	Opponent	Score	Result
1998	Sri Lanka International	(South Korea) Lee Hyo-jung	(South Korea) Jung Sung-gyun (South Korea) Jun Woul-sik	15–13, 17–15	(gold) Winner
1997	Korea International	(South Korea) Lee Hyo-jung	(Malaysia) Norhasikin Amin (Malaysia) Pang Cheh Chang	15–8, 15–9	(gold) Winner

BWF International Challenge tournament
BWF International Series tournament
