= Cai Yun =

Chinese badminton player (born 1980)

Cai Yun 蔡赟
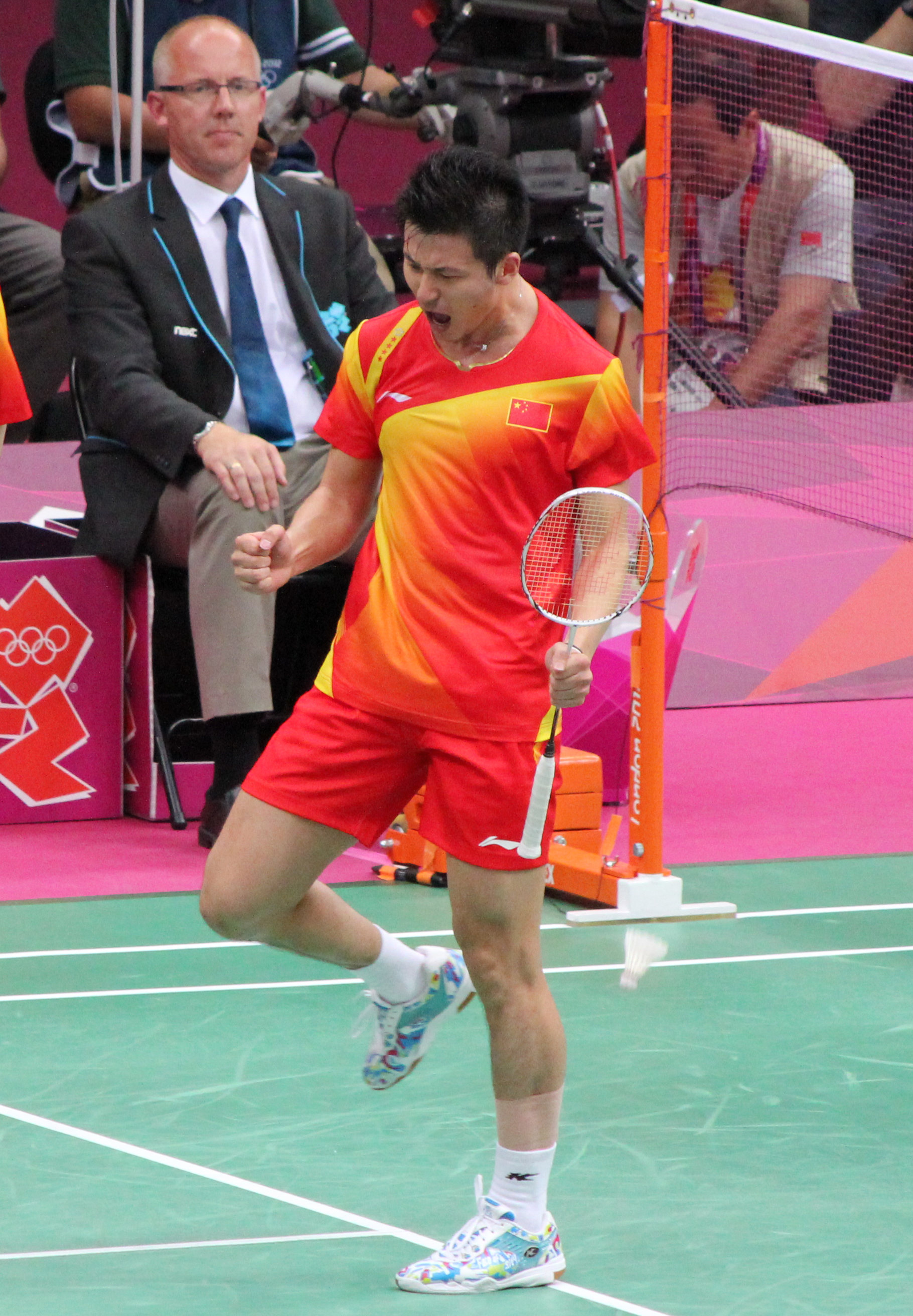

Personal information
- Born: 19 January 1980 (age 46) Suzhou, Jiangsu, China
- Height: 1.82 m (6 ft 0 in)
- Weight: 65 kg (143 lb; 10.2 st)

Sport
- Country: China
- Sport: Badminton
- Handedness: Right

Men's doubles
- Highest ranking: 1 (7 September 2006 with Fu Haifeng)
- BWF profile
Medal record
Men's badminton
Representing China
Olympic Games
Gold medal – first place	2012 London	Men's doubles
Silver medal – second place	2008 Beijing	Men's doubles
World Championships
Gold medal – first place	2006 Madrid	Men's doubles
Gold medal – first place	2009 Hyderabad	Men's doubles
Gold medal – first place	2010 Paris	Men's doubles
Gold medal – first place	2011 London	Men's doubles
Bronze medal – third place	2003 Birmingham	Men's doubles
Bronze medal – third place	2013 Guangzhou	Men's doubles
World Cup
Gold medal – first place	2005 Yiyang	Men's doubles
Bronze medal – third place	2006 Yiyang	Men's doubles
Thomas Cup
Gold medal – first place	2004 Jakarta	Team
Gold medal – first place	2006 Tokyo	Team
Gold medal – first place	2008 Jakarta	Team
Gold medal – first place	2010 Kuala Lumpur	Team
Gold medal – first place	2012 Wuhan	Team
Sudirman Cup
Gold medal – first place	2005 Beijing	Team
Gold medal – first place	2007 Glasgow	Team
Gold medal – first place	2009 Guangzhou	Team
Gold medal – first place	2011 Qingdao	Team
Gold medal – first place	2013 Kuala Lumpur	Team
Gold medal – first place	2015 Dongguan	Team
Silver medal – second place	2003 Eindhoven	Team
Asian Games
Gold medal – first place	2006 Doha	Men's team
Gold medal – first place	2010 Guangzhou	Men's team
Silver medal – second place	2014 Incheon	Men's team
Asian Championships
Gold medal – first place	2011 Chengdu	Men's doubles
Bronze medal – third place	2015 Wuhan	Men's doubles
World Junior Championships
Silver medal – second place	1998 Melbourne	Boys' doubles
Bronze medal – third place	1998 Melbourne	Mixed doubles
Asia Junior Championships
Gold medal – first place	1998 Kuala Lumpur	Boys' team
Gold medal – first place	1997 Manila	Boys' team
Silver medal – second place	1997 Manila	Boys' doubles
- Updated on 09:27, 26 October 2013 (UTC)

Cai Yun
- Traditional Chinese: 蔡贇
- Simplified Chinese: 蔡赟
Transcriptions
Standard Mandarin
- Hanyu Pinyin: Cài Yūn

Cai Yun (born 19 January 1980) is a former professional badminton player representing China. He is the 2012 London Olympic gold medallist and a four-time World Champion in men's doubles. He is regarded as one of the greatest men's doubles players of all time.

== Sport career ==
Combining Cai Yun's speed with his regular partner Fu Haifeng's power, Cai and Fu have been one of the world's leading men's doubles teams since 2004. They have won numerous top tier events on the world circuit including the All England Open Championships in 2005 and 2009. They have won the BWF World Championships 4 times in 2006, 2009, 2010 and 2011, becoming the first Men's Doubles pair to achieve this triumph. Cai and Fu have helped China win five consecutive Thomas Cup (Men's Team World Badminton Championships) (2004, 2006, 2008, 2010, and 2012) and six consecutive Sudirman Cup (World Team Championships) (2005, 2007, 2009, 2011, 2013 and 2015). Cai and Fu also competed together in the Olympic Games 3 times, including the 2004, the 2008 Olympic Games and the 2012 Olympic Games. They were eliminated in the quarterfinals in 2004, and in 2008 in Beijing were silver medalists, losing a final to Indonesia's Markis Kido and Hendra Setiawan.

At the 2010 BWF World Championships, they, being the fifth-seed, beat the third-seed Danish pair Mathias Boe and Carsten Mogensen 21–11, 21–18 in the quarterfinals. In the semifinals, they defeated the second-seed Indonesian Olympic Champions Markis Kido and Hendra Setiawan 21–16, 21–13. In the finals, they overcame the first-seed and Malaysian world no. 1 Koo Kien Keat and Tan Boon Heong 18–21, 21–18, 21–14 to win the world title for the 3rd time. They are the first Men's Doubles pair to achieve this feat.

Cai and Fu went on to win the Li-Ning China Masters Super Series. Being the fifth-seed, they first defeated their second-seed compatriots Xu Chen and Guo Zhendong 21–11, 21–16 in the quarterfinals. In the semifinals, they made a great comeback against the third-seed South Korean rival Lee Yong-dae and Jung Jae-sung 20–22, 21–13, 21–17. Cai and Fu then clinched their second China Masters title by defeating the fourth-seed South Korean pair Yoo Yeon-seong and Ko Sung-hyun in 2 sets 21–14, 21–19. Cai and Fu won their third title in a row by winning the Yonex Japan Open Super Series. They, being the fifth-seed, beat the young Korean pair Cho Gun-woo and Kwon Yi-goo 21–14, 16–21, 21–12 in the quarterfinals. In the semifinals, they defeated their promising compatriots Zhang Nan and Chai Biao 21–17, 21–16. In the finals, they made a great comeback again against the first-seed and Malaysian world no. 1 Koo Kien Keat and Tan Boon Heong 18–21, 21–14, 21–12 to win their first Japan Open title.

In the 2012 Summer Olympics, they defeated Denmark's Mathias Boe and Carsten Mogensen in the final to win the gold medal.

Cai and Fu have won an Olympic gold medal and four World Championship titles, among other titles, and have been described as one of the most successful men's doubles pairs in badminton history. They have expressed intent to continue their career together after the London Olympics.

== Achievements ==
=== Olympic Games ===
Men's doubles
Year	Venue	Partner	Opponent	Score	Result
2008	Beijing University of Technology Gymnasium, Beijing, China	(China) Fu Haifeng	(Indonesia) Markis Kido (Indonesia) Hendra Setiawan	21–12, 11–21, 16–21	Silver
2012	Wembley Arena, London, Great Britain	(China) Fu Haifeng	(Denmark) Mathias Boe (Denmark) Carsten Mogensen	21–16, 21–15	Gold

=== BWF World Championships ===
Men's doubles
Year	Venue	Partner	Opponent	Score	Result
2003	National Indoor Arena, Birmingham, United Kingdom	(China) Fu Haifeng	(Indonesia) Sigit Budiarto (Indonesia) Candra Wijaya	15–6, 10–15, 9–15	Bronze
2006	Palacio de Deportes de la Comunidad, Madrid, Spain	(China) Fu Haifeng	(England) Robert Blair (England) Anthony Clark	21–9, 21–13	Gold
2009	Gachibowli Indoor Stadium, Hyderabad, India	(China) Fu Haifeng	(South Korea) Jung Jae-sung (South Korea) Lee Yong-dae	21–18, 16–21, 28–26	Gold
2010	Stade Pierre de Coubertin, Paris, France	(China) Fu Haifeng	(Malaysia) Koo Kien Keat (Malaysia) Tan Boon Heong	18–21, 21–18, 21–14	Gold
2011	Wembley Arena, London, England	(China) Fu Haifeng	(South Korea) Ko Sung-hyun (South Korea) Yoo Yeon-seong	24–22, 21–16	Gold
2013	Tianhe Sports Center, Guangzhou, China	(China) Fu Haifeng	(Indonesia) Mohammad Ahsan (Indonesia) Hendra Setiawan	19–21, 17–21	Bronze

=== World Cup ===
Men's doubles
Year	Venue	Partner	Opponent	Score	Result
2005	Olympic Park, Yiyang, China	(China) Fu Haifeng	(Indonesia) Sigit Budiarto (Indonesia) Candra Wijaya	21–11, 21–18	Gold
2006	Olympic Park, Yiyang, China	(China) Fu Haifeng	(Malaysia) Lin Woon Fui (Malaysia) Mohd Fairuzizuan Mohd Tazari	15–21, 21–13, 17–21	Bronze

=== Asian Championships ===
Men's doubles
Year	Venue	Partner	Opponent	Score	Result
2011	Sichuan Gymnasium, Chengdu, China	(China) Fu Haifeng	(Japan) Hirokatsu Hashimoto (Japan) Noriyasu Hirata	21–12, 21–15	Gold
2015	Wuhan Sports Center Gymnasium, Wuhan, China	(China) Lu Kai	(Indonesia) Mohammad Ahsan (Indonesia) Hendra Setiawan	12–21, 21–18, 16–21	Bronze

=== World Junior Championships ===
Boys' doubles
Year	Venue	Partner	Opponent	Score	Result
1998	Sports and Aquatic Centre, Melbourne, Australia	(China) Jiang Shan	(Malaysia) Chan Chong Ming (Malaysia) Teo Kok Seng	7–15, 3–15	Silver

Mixed doubles
Year	Venue	Partner	Opponent	Score	Result
1998	Sports and Aquatic Centre, Melbourne, Australia	(China) Xie Xingfang	(Malaysia) Chan Chong Ming (Malaysia) Joanne Quay	4–15, 3–15	Bronze

=== Asian Junior Championships ===
Boys' doubles
Year	Venue	Partner	Opponent	Score	Result
1997	Ninoy Aquino Stadium; Manila, Philippines	(China) Zhang Yi	(Malaysia) Chan Chong Ming (Malaysia) Jeremy Gan	6–15, 3–15	Silver

=== BWF Superseries (15 titles, 9 runners-up) ===
The BWF Superseries, which was launched on 14 December 2006 and implemented in 2007, was a series of elite badminton tournaments, sanctioned by the Badminton World Federation (BWF). BWF Superseries levels were Superseries and Superseries Premier. A season of Superseries consisted of twelve tournaments around the world that had been introduced since 2011. Successful players were invited to the Superseries Finals, which were held at the end of each year.

Men's doubles
Year	Tournament	Partner	Opponent	Score	Result
2007	All England Open	(China) Fu Haifeng	(Malaysia) Koo Kien Keat (Malaysia) Tan Boon Heong	15–21, 18–21	(silver) Runner-up
2007	Singapore Open	(China) Fu Haifeng	(Malaysia) Choong Tan Fook (Malaysia) Lee Wan Wah	16–21, 24–22, 21–18	(gold) Winner
2007	Indonesia Open	(China) Fu Haifeng	(Malaysia) Mohd Zakry Abdul Latif (Malaysia) Mohd Fairuzizuan Mohd Tazari	21–17, 22–20	(gold) Winner
2007	China Masters	(China) Fu Haifeng	(Indonesia) Markis Kido (Indonesia) Hendra Setiawan	21–15, 21–16	(gold) Winner
2007	French Open	(China) Fu Haifeng	(Malaysia) Choong Tan Fook (Malaysia) Lee Wan Wah	21–14, 21–19	(gold) Winner
2008	Korea Open	(China) Fu Haifeng	(Indonesia) Luluk Hadiyanto (Indonesia) Alvent Yulianto	21–7, 20–22, 21–17	(gold) Winner
2008	French Open	(China) Xu Chen	(Indonesia) Markis Kido (Indonesia) Hendra Setiawan	18–21, 19–21	(silver) Runner-up
2009	All England Open	(China) Fu Haifeng	(South Korea) Han Sang-hoon (South Korea) Hwang Ji-man	21–17, 21–15	(gold) Winner
2009	Indonesia Open	(China) Fu Haifeng	(South Korea) Jung Jae-sung (South Korea) Lee Yong-dae	15–21, 18–21	(silver) Runner-up
2009	China Masters	(China) Fu Haifeng	(China) Guo Zhendong (China) Xu Chen	Walkover	(silver) Runner-up
2010	Korea Open	(China) Fu Haifeng	(South Korea) Jung Jae-sung (South Korea) Lee Yong-dae	11–21, 21–14, 18–21	(silver) Runner-up
2010	China Masters	(China) Fu Haifeng	(South Korea) Ko Sung-hyun (South Korea) Yoo Yeon-seong	21–14, 21–19	(gold) Winner
2010	Japan Open	(China) Fu Haifeng	(Malaysia) Koo Kien Keat (Malaysia) Tan Boon Heong	18–21, 21–14, 21–12	(gold) Winner
2011	Singapore Open	(China) Fu Haifeng	(Indonesia) Hendra Aprida Gunawan (Indonesia) Alvent Yulianto	21–17, 21–13	(gold) Winner
2011	Indonesia Open	(China) Fu Haifeng	(China) Chai Biao (China) Guo Zhendong	21–13, 21–12	(gold) Winner
2011	China Masters	(China) Fu Haifeng	(South Korea) Jung Jae-sung (South Korea) Lee Yong-dae	17–21, 10–21	(silver) Runner-up
2011	Japan Open	(China) Fu Haifeng	(Indonesia) Mohammad Ahsan (Indonesia) Bona Septano	21–13, 23–21	(gold) Winner
2011	Denmark Open	(China) Fu Haifeng	(South Korea) Jung Jae-sung (South Korea) Lee Yong-dae	16–21, 17–21	(silver) Runner-up
2011	French Open	(China) Fu Haifeng	(South Korea) Jung Jae-sung (South Korea) Lee Yong-dae	21–14, 15–21, 11–21	(silver) Runner-up
2011	Hong Kong Open	(China) Fu Haifeng	(South Korea) Jung Jae-sung (South Korea) Lee Yong-dae	14–21, 24–22, 21–19	(gold) Winner
2012	Korea Open	(China) Fu Haifeng	(South Korea) Jung Jae-sung (South Korea) Lee Yong-dae	18–21, 21–17, 21–19	(gold) Winner
2012	All England Open	(China) Fu Haifeng	(South Korea) Jung Jae-sung (South Korea) Lee Yong-dae	23–21, 9–21, 14–21	(silver) Runner-up
2012	Hong Kong Open	(China) Fu Haifeng	(Malaysia) Koo Kien Keat (Malaysia) Tan Boon Heong	21–16, 21–17	(gold) Winner
2014	Singapore Open	(China) Lu Kai	(Chinese Taipei) Lee Sheng-mu (Chinese Taipei) Tsai Chia-hsin	21–19, 21–14	(gold) Winner

BWF Super Series Finals tournament
BWF Super Series Premier tournament
BWF Super Series tournament

=== BWF Grand Prix (8 titles, 7 runners-up) ===
The BWF Grand Prix had two levels, the Grand Prix and Grand Prix Gold. It was a series of badminton tournaments sanctioned by the Badminton World Federation (BWF) and played between 2007 and 2017. The World Badminton Grand Prix was sanctioned by the International Badminton Federation from 1983 to 2006.

Men's doubles
Year	Tournament	Partner	Opponent	Score	Result
2003	Malaysia Open	(China) Fu Haifeng	(South Korea) Kim Dong-moon (South Korea) Lee Dong-soo	15–17, 11–15	(silver) Runner-up
2003	German Open	(China) Fu Haifeng	(Indonesia) Eng Hian (Indonesia) Flandy Limpele	15–9, 8–15, 4–15	(silver) Runner-up
2004	Swiss Open	(China) Fu Haifeng	(Indonesia) Luluk Hadiyanto (Indonesia) Alvent Yulianto	15–9, 17–14	(gold) Winner
2004	Japan Open	(China) Fu Haifeng	(South Korea) Ha Tae-kwon (South Korea) Kim Dong-moon	7–15, 15–6, 6–15	(silver) Runner-up
2004	Indonesia Open	(China) Fu Haifeng	(Indonesia) Luluk Hadiyanto (Indonesia) Alvent Yulianto	8–15, 11–15	(silver) Runner-up
2005	German Open	(China) Fu Haifeng	(Denmark) Jens Eriksen (Denmark) Martin Lundgaard Hansen	6–15, 15–3, 15–10	(gold) Winner
2005	All England Open	(China) Fu Haifeng	(Denmark) Lars Paaske (Denmark) Jonas Rasmussen	15–10, 15–6	(gold) Winner
2005	Malaysia Open	(China) Fu Haifeng	(Indonesia) Sigit Budiarto (Indonesia) Candra Wijaya	11–15, 14–17	(silver) Runner-up
2005	Hong Kong Open	(China) Fu Haifeng	(Denmark) Jens Eriksen (Denmark) Martin Lundgaard Hansen	15–13, 15–9	(gold) Winner
2006	China Masters	(China) Fu Haifeng	(Denmark) Jens Eriksen (Denmark) Martin Lundgaard Hansen	17–21, 17–21	(silver) Runner-up
2006	Chinese Taipei Open	(China) Fu Haifeng	(South Korea) Jung Jae-sung (South Korea) Lee Yong-dae	21–14, 21–18	(gold) Winner
2006	Macau Open	(China) Fu Haifeng	(China) Guo Zhendong (China) Zheng Bo	21–12, 9–21, 21–19	(gold) Winner
2006	China Open	(China) Fu Haifeng	(Indonesia) Markis Kido (Indonesia) Hendra Setiawan	16–21, 16–21	(silver) Runner-up
2008	Thailand Open	(China) Fu Haifeng	(China) Guo Zhendong (China) Xie Zhongbo	21–17, retired	(gold) Winner
2015	Swiss Open	(China) Lu Kai	(Malaysia) Goh V Shem (Malaysia) Tan Wee Kiong	21–19, 14–21, 21–17	(gold) Winner

BWF Grand Prix Gold tournament
BWF Grand Prix tournament

== Personal life ==
Cai Yun married synchronised swimmer Wang Na in 2010. Wang Na gave birth to a daughter in 2012, and to a second child in probably late 2014. (Cai Yun's doubles partner-turned-coach Zhang Jun married Wang Na's teammate Hu Ni in 2006.)
