= Lee Hyo-jung (badminton) =

South Korean badminton player (born 1981)

Lee Hyo-jung 이효정
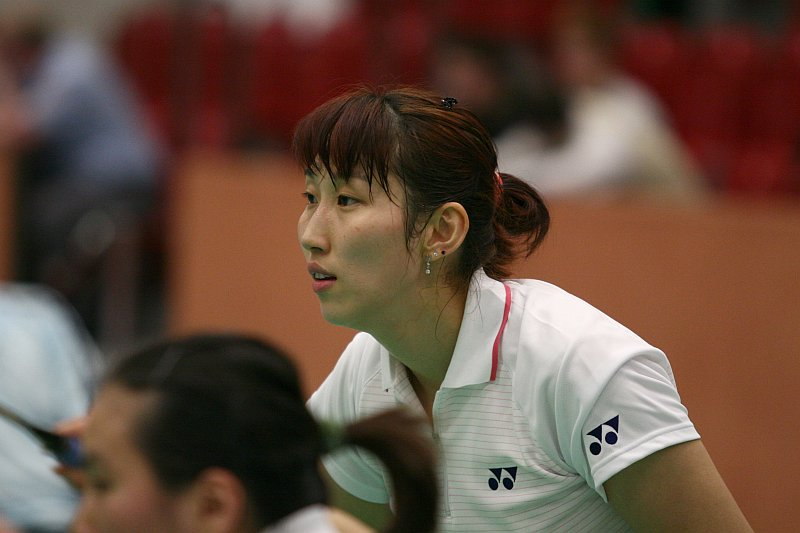

Personal information
- Born: 13 January 1981 (age 45) Busan, South Korea
- Years active: 1999-2010
- Height: 1.81 m (5 ft 11 in)

Sport
- Country: South Korea
- Sport: Badminton
- Handedness: Right

Women's & mixed doubles
- Highest ranking: 4 (WD); 1 (XD with Lee Yong-dae)
- BWF profile
Medal record
Representing South Korea
Women's badminton
Olympic Games
Gold medal – first place	2008 Beijing	Mixed doubles
Silver medal – second place	2008 Beijing	Women's doubles
World Championships
Bronze medal – third place	2005 Anaheim	Women's doubles
Bronze medal – third place	2009 Hyderabad	Mixed doubles
Sudirman Cup
Gold medal – first place	2003 Eindhoven	Mixed team
Silver medal – second place	2009 Guangzhou	Mixed team
Bronze medal – third place	2005 Beijing	Mixed team
Bronze medal – third place	2007 Glasgow	Mixed team
Uber Cup
Gold medal – first place	2010 Kuala Lumpur	Women's team
Silver medal – second place	2002 Guangzhou	Women's team
Silver medal – second place	2004 Jakarta	Women's team
Bronze medal – third place	2000 Kuala Lumpur	Women's team
Bronze medal – third place	2008 Jakarta	Women's team
Asian Games
Gold medal – first place	2010 Guangzhou	Mixed doubles
Silver medal – second place	2002 Busan	Women's team
Bronze medal – third place	2002 Busan	Women's doubles
Bronze medal – third place	2006 Doha	Women's doubles
Bronze medal – third place	2006 Doha	Women's team
Bronze medal – third place	2010 Guangzhou	Women's doubles
Bronze medal – third place	2010 Guangzhou	Women's team
Asian Championships
Gold medal – first place	2000 Jakarta	Women's doubles
Gold medal – first place	2004 Kuala Lumpur	Women's doubles
Gold medal – first place	2005 Hyderabad	Women's doubles
Gold medal – first place	2009 Suwon	Mixed doubles
Silver medal – second place	2003 Jakarta	Women's doubles
Silver medal – second place	2005 Hyderabad	Mixed doubles
Silver medal – second place	2009 Suwon	Women's doubles
Bronze medal – third place	2003 Jakarta	Mixed doubles
Bronze medal – third place	2008 Johor Bahru	Women's doubles
World Junior Championships
Silver medal – second place	1998 Melbourne	Mixed doubles
Bronze medal – third place	1998 Melbourne	Girls' doubles
Asian Junior Championships
Silver medal – second place	1998 Kuala Lumpur	Girls' doubles
Silver medal – second place	1998 Kuala Lumpur	Girls' team

Lee Hyo-jung (Korean: 이효정; Hanja: 李孝貞; Korean pronunciation: [i.ɦjo.dʑʌŋ]; born 13 January 1981) is a South Korean former badminton player.

She won the gold medal in badminton mixed doubles at the 2008 Summer Olympics with her partner, Lee Yong-dae. Lee Hyo-jung and Lee Yong-dae were unseeded, and in the finals they beat the top seeds and 2005 and 2007 world champions Liliyana Natsir and Nova Widianto of Indonesia, 21-11, 21-17.

Lee Hyo-jung also won the silver medal in badminton women's doubles at the aforementioned Olympics with Lee Kyung-won; they were seeded fourth and lost to the second-seeded Chinese pair, Du Jing and Yu Yang.

Lee became the first woman in Korean history to win gold medals at both the Olympics and the Asian Games. In the 2010 Asian Games, she partnered with Shin Baek-cheol instead of her usual partner, Lee Yong-dae. After winning the medal, she announced her retirement despite many pleas from her coaches and fans at home to continue playing until the London Olympics in 2012.

== Career ==
In 1998, Lee who attended the Haksan Girls' High School won the girls' singles, doubles, and mixed doubles events at the German Junior tournament. She was competed at the World and Asian Junior Championships. At the World Junior, she partnered with Jun Woul-sik in the girls' doubles and Choi Min-ho in the mixed doubles, captured the bronze and silver medals respectively. She and Jun also won the silver medal at the Asian Junior. Lee junior competed in some international senior (level 4) tournament, and won double titles at the Korea and Sri Lanka International, also women's doubles title at the Hungarian, Australian and Norwegian International tournaments.

In 2000, Lee won the Asian Championships in the women's doubles event with her partner Yim Kyung-jin. At the age of 19, Lee competed at the Sydney Olympics in the women's doubles with Yim and in the mixed doubles with Lee Dong-soo. She and Yim defeated in the second round, while with Lee Dong-soo defeated in the first round.

In 2002, Lee finished as the runners-up at the Chinese Taipei and Singapore Open in the women's doubles event with Hwang Yu-mi. In 2003, she and Hwang also the runner-up at the Thailand and Chinese Taipei Open. In the mixed doubles event, Lee who was teamed-up with Kim Yong-hyun achieved their best result by winning the bronze medal at the Asian Championships. In 2004, Lee competed for Korea at the Summer Olympics in the women's and mixed doubles with partner Hwang Yu-mi and Kim Yong-hyun respectively. Lee and Hwang had a bye in the first round and defeated Cheng Wen-Hsing and Chien Yu Chin of Chinese Taipei in the second. In the quarter-finals, Lee and Hwang lost to Zhao Tingting and Wei Yili of China 8–15, 15–6, 15–13. In the mixed doubles event, Lee and Kim were seeded three, but the pairs defeat by the Danish pair in the second round in the rubber game.

In 2008, Lee won her first All England Open Championship title in women's doubles with partner Lee Kyung-won, beating Yang Wei and Zhang Jiewen in the semifinals and Du Jing and Yu Yang in the final. In August, she and Lee Yong-dae won mixed doubles gold medals in Beijing Olympics, beating Liliyana Natsir and Nova Widianto of Indonesia and also with Lee Kyung-won grabbed the silver medal in the women's doubles event. In 2009, Lee and Lee Yong-dae became world number one. They won three titles: Korea Open Super Series, Asian Badminton Championship, and China Open Super Series. They also played for Korea in Sudirman Cup in May. In the final, Korea lost to China 0–3. Lee and Lee were defeated by the Chinese pair, Zheng Bo and Yu Yang.

In 2010, Lee competed in the 2010 Uber Cup as a member of the South Korean women's national team. There she led her team to its first Uber Cup trophy, winning all 4 doubles matches she competed in through the tourney. In the finals, she and her partner Kim Min-jung won against WR #1 Ma Jin and Wang Xiaoli, beating them 18–21, 21–12, 21–15. Although Lee and Kim were not regular partners and Lee Hyo-Jung stopped playing WD regularly in international games, Lee played exceptionally well, proving why she was the most successful player in the 2008 Olympics, winning both gold and silver medals. In June, Lee continued on playing women's doubles with Kim Min-jung, winning the Indonesia Open and the Chinese Taipei Grand Prix Gold, and finishing as a runner-up in the Singapore Open. While waiting for Lee Yong-dae to recover from his injury, she played mixed doubles with Shin Baek-cheol.

In August, Lee partnered again with Lee Yong-dae in the Kumpoo Macau Open Badminton Championships, Chinese Taipei Grand Prix Gold, and World Championship, but their best finish was reaching the quarterfinals in the Chinese Taipei Grand Prix. They were hit with Lee Hyo Jung's back injury and Lee Yong-dae getting used to playing again after rehab and possibly not fully recovering from the previous injury. Due to these reasons, the head coach of the Korea Badminton Team was quoted as saying that Lee Hyo-jung and Lee Yong-dae had not had sufficient time to practice together. Lee Yong-dae decided to stop playing mixed doubles altogether, possibly due to the strain on his injured elbow from playing both men's and mixed doubles. In November, Lee Hyo-jung entered Asian Games in three games total: women's, mixed, and team event. In the women's doubles and team event, she won bronze medals. However, in mixed doubles, she partnered with Shin Baek-cheol, with whom she had previously played only two tournaments, but they still managed to win against two Chinese pairs (Zhang Nan and Zhao Yunlei, He Han Bin and Ma Jin) at their home court, becoming the first woman in Korean history to win both Olympic and Asian Game gold medals.

== Achievements ==
=== Olympic Games ===
Women's doubles
Year	Venue	Partner	Opponent	Score	Result
2008	Beijing University of Technology Gymnasium, Beijing, China	(South Korea) Lee Kyung-won	(China) Du Jing (China) Yu Yang	15–21, 13–21	Silver

Mixed doubles
Year	Venue	Partner	Opponent	Score	Result
2008	Beijing University of Technology Gymnasium, Beijing, China	(South Korea) Lee Yong-dae	(Indonesia) Nova Widianto (Indonesia) Liliyana Natsir	21–11, 21–17	Gold

=== BWF World Championships ===
Women's doubles
Year	Venue	Partner	Opponent	Score	Result
2005	Arrowhead Pond, Anaheim, United States	(South Korea) Lee Kyung-won	(China) Yang Wei (China) Zhang Jiewen	4–15, 3–15	Bronze

Mixed doubles
Year	Venue	Partner	Opponent	Score	Result
2009	Gachibowli Indoor Stadium, Hyderabad, India	(South Korea) Lee Yong-dae	(Denmark) Thomas Laybourn (Denmark) Kamilla Rytter Juhl	21–18, 9–21, 18–21	Bronze

=== Asian Games ===
Women's doubles
Year	Venue	Partner	Opponent	Score	Result
2002	Gangseo Gymnasium, Busan, South Korea	(South Korea) Hwang Yu-mi	(China) Gao Ling (China) Huang Sui	2–11, 9–11	Bronze
2006	Aspire Hall 3, Doha, Qatar	(South Korea) Lee Kyung-won	(China) Gao Ling (China) Huang Sui	16–21, 12–21	Bronze
2010	Tianhe Gymnasium, Guangzhou, China	(South Korea) Kim Min-jung	(China) Tian Qing (China) Zhao Yunlei	9–21, 12–21	Bronze

Mixed doubles
Year	Venue	Partner	Opponent	Score	Result
2010	Tianhe Gymnasium, Guangzhou, China	(South Korea) Shin Baek-cheol	(China) Zhang Nan (China) Zhao Yunlei	21–19, 21–14	Gold

=== Asian Championships ===
Women's doubles
Year	Venue	Partner	Opponent	Score	Result
2000	Istora Senayan, Jakarta, Indonesia	(South Korea) Yim Kyung-jin	(Indonesia) Etty Tantri (Indonesia) Minarti Timur	15–8, 15–13	Gold
2003	Tennis Indoor Gelora Bung Karno, Jakarta, Indonesia	(South Korea) Hwang Yu-mi	(South Korea) Ra Kyung-min (South Korea) Lee Kyung-won	9–15, 7–15	Silver
2004	Kuala Lumpur Badminton Stadium, Kuala Lumpur, Malaysia	(South Korea) Lee Kyung-won	(China) Du Jing (China) Yu Yang	6–15, 15–11, 15–7	Gold
2005	Gachibowli Indoor Stadium, Hyderabad, India	(South Korea) Lee Kyung-won	(Japan) Kumiko Ogura (Japan) Reiko Shiota	15–13, 8–15, 15–5	Gold
2008	Bandaraya Stadium, Johor Bahru, Malaysia	(South Korea) Lee Kyung-won	(Chinese Taipei) Chien Yu-chin (Chinese Taipei) Cheng Wen-hsing	18–21, 5–21	Bronze
2009	Suwon Indoor Stadium, Suwon, South Korea	(South Korea) Lee Kyung-won	(China) Ma Jin (China) Wang Xiaoli	11–21, 18–21	Silver

Mixed doubles
Year	Venue	Partner	Opponent	Score	Result
2003	Tennis Indoor Gelora Bung Karno, Jakarta, Indonesia	(South Korea) Kim Yong-hyun	(Indonesia) Anggun Nugroho (Indonesia) Eny Widiowati	13–15, 8–15	Bronze
2005	Gachibowli Indoor Stadium, Hyderabad, India	(South Korea) Lee Jae-jin	(Thailand) Sudket Prapakamol (Thailand) Saralee Thungthongkam	11–15, 17–14, 10–15	Silver
2009	Suwon Indoor Stadium, Suwon, South Korea	(South Korea) Lee Yong-dae	(South Korea) Yoo Yeon-seong (South Korea) Kim Min-jung	21–12, 21–15	Gold

=== World Junior Championships ===
Girls' doubles
Year	Venue	Partner	Opponent	Score	Result
1998	Sports and Aquatic Centre, Melbourne, Australia	(South Korea) Jun Woul-sik	(China) Xie Xingfang (China) Zhang Jiewen	16–17, 1–15	Bronze

Mixed doubles
Year	Venue	Partner	Opponent	Score	Result
1998	Sports and Aquatic Centre, Melbourne, Australia	(South Korea) Choi Min-ho	(Malaysia) Chan Chong Ming (Malaysia) Joanne Quay	6–15, 10–15	Silver

=== Asian Junior Championships ===
Girls' doubles
Year	Venue	Partner	Opponent	Score	Result
1998	Kuala Lumpur Badminton Stadium, Kuala Lumpur, Malaysia	(South Korea) Jun Woul-sik	(China) Gong Ruina (China) Huang Sui	13–15, 8–15	Silver

=== BWF Superseries (9 titles, 10 runners-up) ===
The BWF Superseries, launched on 14 December 2006 and implemented in 2007, is a series of elite badminton tournaments, sanctioned by Badminton World Federation (BWF). BWF Superseries has two level such as Superseries and Superseries Premier. A season of Superseries features twelve tournaments around the world, which introduced since 2011, with successful players invited to the Superseries Finals held at the year end.

Women's doubles
Year	Tournament	Partner	Opponent	Score	Result
2007	Swiss Open	(South Korea) Lee Kyung-won	(China) Yang Wei (China) Zhao Tingting	15–21, 10–21	(silver) Runner-up
2007	Denmark Open	(South Korea) Lee Kyung-won	(China) Yang Wei (China) Zhang Jiewen	21–12, 19–21, 19–21	(silver) Runner-up
2008	All England Open	(South Korea) Lee Kyung-won	(China) Du Jing (China) Yu Yang	12–21, 21–18, 21–14	(gold) Winner
2009	Malaysia Open	(South Korea) Lee Kyung-won	(China) Yang Wei (China) Zhang Jiewen	21–15, 21–12	(gold) Winner
2009	Korea Open	(South Korea) Lee Kyung-won	(Chinese Taipei) Cheng Wen-hsing (Chinese Taipei) Chien Yu-chin	19–21, 8–21	(silver) Runner-up
2009	Swiss Open	(South Korea) Lee Kyung-won	(China) Du Jing (China) Yu Yang	11–21, 12–21	(silver) Runner-up
2010	Singapore Open	(South Korea) Kim Min-jung	(Singapore) Shinta Mulia Sari (Singapore) Yao Lei	17–21, 20–22	(silver) Runner-up
2010	Indonesia Open	(South Korea) Kim Min-jung	(Chinese Taipei) Cheng Wen-hsing (Chinese Taipei) Chien Yu-chin	21–12, 12–21, 21–11	(gold) Winner

Mixed doubles
Year	Tournament	Partner	Opponent	Score	Result
2007	Swiss Open	(South Korea) Lee Yong-dae	(Indonesia) Muhammad Rijal (Indonesia) Greysia Polii	14–21, 21–16, 21–18	(gold) Winner
2008	Malaysia Open	(South Korea) Lee Yong-dae	(China) He Hanbin (China) Yu Yang	14–21, 15–21	(silver) Runner-up
2008	Korea Open	(South Korea) Lee Yong-dae	(Indonesia) Flandy Limpele (Indonesia) Vita Marissa	15–21, 21–14, 21–18	(gold) Winner
2008	China Open	(South Korea) Lee Yong-dae	(China) Xu Chen (China) Zhao Yunlei	21–16, 21–15	(gold) Winner
2008	Hong Kong Open	(South Korea) Lee Yong-dae	(China) Xie Zhongbo (China) Zhang Yawen	14–21, 16–21	(silver) Runner-up
2009	Malaysia Open	(South Korea) Lee Yong-dae	(Indonesia) Nova Widianto (Indonesia) Liliyana Natsir	14–21, 19–21	(silver) Runner-up
2009	Korea Open	(South Korea) Lee Yong-dae	(Thailand) Songphon Anugritayawon (Thailand) Kunchala Voravichitchaikul	21–8, 21–7	(gold) Winner
2009	Swiss Open	(South Korea) Lee Yong-dae	(China) Zheng Bo (China) Ma Jin	16–21, 15–21	(silver) Runner-up
2009	Indonesia Open	(South Korea) Lee Yong-dae	(China) Zheng Bo (China) Ma Jin	17–21, 21–8, 16–21	(silver) Runner-up
2009	China Open	(South Korea) Lee Yong-dae	(China) Zheng Bo (China) Ma Jin	21–18, 15–21, 21–15	(gold) Winner
2010	Swiss Open	(South Korea) Lee Yong-dae	(South Korea) Shin Baek-cheol (South Korea) Yoo Hyun-young	21–14, 21–18	(gold) Winner

BWF Super Series Finals tournament
BWF Super Series Premier tournament
BWF Super Series tournament

=== BWF Grand Prix (13 titles, 16 runners-up) ===
The BWF Grand Prix had two levels, the Grand Prix and Grand Prix Gold. It was a series of badminton tournaments sanctioned by the Badminton World Federation (BWF) and played between 2007 and 2017. The World Badminton Grand Prix was sanctioned by the International Badminton Federation from 1983 to 2006.

Women's doubles
Year	Tournament	Partner	Opponent	Score	Result
2002	Chinese Taipei Open	(South Korea) Hwang Yu-mi	(Thailand) Sathinee Chankrachangwong (Thailand) Saralee Thungthongkam	11–4, 12–13, 8–11	(silver) Runner-up
2002	Singapore Open	(South Korea) Hwang Yu-mi	(China) Huang Nanyan (China) Yang Wei	1–11, 8–11	(silver) Runner-up
2003	Thailand Open	(South Korea) Yim Kyung-jin	(China) Wei Yili (China) Zhao Tingting	9–11, 11–5, 6–11	(silver) Runner-up
2003	Dutch Open	(South Korea) Hwang Yu-mi	(South Korea) Lee Kyung-won (South Korea) Ra Kyung-min	4–15, 9–15	(silver) Runner-up
2003	Chinese Taipei Open	(South Korea) Hwang Yu-mi	(South Korea) Lee Kyung-won (South Korea) Ra Kyung-min	9–15, 8–15	(silver) Runner-up
2005	Korea Open	(South Korea) Lee Kyung-won	(England) Gail Emms (England) Donna Kellogg	Walkover	(gold) Winner
2005	Swiss Open	(South Korea) Lee Kyung-won	(Chinese Taipei) Cheng Wen-hsing (Chinese Taipei) Chien Yu-chin	15–8, 15–12	(gold) Winner
2005	Thailand Open	(South Korea) Lee Kyung-won	(China) Zhang Dan (China) Zhang Yawen	9–15, 15–11, 15–13	(gold) Winner
2005	Indonesia Open	(South Korea) Lee Kyung-won	(Malaysia) Chin Eei Hui (Malaysia) Wong Pei Tty	15–4, 15–5	(gold) Winner
2006	Chinese Taipei Open	(South Korea) Lee Kyung-won	(China) Gao Ling (China) Huang Sui	21–18, 9–21, 21–17	(gold) Winner
2006	Macau Open	(South Korea) Lee Kyung-won	(China) Gao Ling (China) Huang Sui	21–17, 14–21, 14–21	(silver) Runner-up
2006	Thailand Open	(South Korea) Lee Kyung-won	(Thailand) Sathinee Chankrachangwong (Thailand) Saralee Thungthongkam	21–18, 21–9	(gold) Winner
2007	Macau Open	(South Korea) Lee Kyung-won	(China) Gao Ling (China) Huang Sui	15–21, 7–21	(silver) Runner-up
2008	German Open	(South Korea) Lee Kyung-won	(Japan) Miyuki Maeda (Japan) Satoko Suetsuna	21–17, 21–16	(gold) Winner
2010	Chinese Taipei Open	(South Korea) Kim Min-jung	(South Korea) Lee Kyung-won (South Korea) Yoo Hyun-young	21–14, 22–20	(gold) Winner

Mixed doubles
Year	Tournament	Partner	Opponent	Score	Result
2003	Korea Open	(South Korea) Kim Yong-hyun	(South Korea) Kim Dong-moon (South Korea) Ra Kyung-min	5–11, 4–11	(silver) Runner-up
2003	Swiss Open	(South Korea) Kim Yong-hyun	(Denmark) Jens Eriksen (Denmark) Mette Schjoldager	7–11, 11–9, 5–11	(silver) Runner-up
2003	Dutch Open	(South Korea) Kim Yong-hyun	(South Korea) Kim Dong-moon (South Korea) Ra Kyung-min	4–15, 2–15	(silver) Runner-up
2003	Denmark Open	(South Korea) Kim Yong-hyun	(South Korea) Kim Dong-moon (South Korea) Ra Kyung-min	16–17, 10–15	(silver) Runner-up
2004	Korea Open	(South Korea) Kim Yong-hyun	(South Korea) Kim Dong-moon (South Korea) Ra Kyung-min	5–15, 11–15	(silver) Runner-up
2004	All England Open	(South Korea) Kim Yong-hyun	(South Korea) Kim Dong-moon (South Korea) Ra Kyung-min	8–15, 15–17	(silver) Runner-up
2004	Malaysia Open	(South Korea) Kim Yong-hyun	(China) Zhang Jun (China) Gao Ling	2–15, 11–15	(silver) Runner-up
2005	Korea Open	(South Korea) Lee Jae-jin	(Denmark) Jens Eriksen (Denmark) Mette Schjoldager	17–14, 15–9	(gold) Winner
2005	Thailand Open	(South Korea) Lee Jae-jin	(Denmark) Thomas Laybourn (Denmark) Kamilla Rytter Juhl	15–12, 15–12	(gold) Winner
2005	Malaysia Open	(South Korea) Lee Jae-jin	(China) Chen Qiqiu (China) Zhao Tingting	15–12, 15–11	(gold) Winner
2005	German Open	(South Korea) Lee Jae-jin	(England) Nathan Robertson (England) Gail Emms	15–12, 17–14	(gold) Winner
2005	China Open	(South Korea) Lee Jae-jin	(England) Nathan Robertson (England) Gail Emms	10–15, 10–15	(silver) Runner-up
2006	Chinese Taipei Open	(South Korea) Lee Jae-jin	(Indonesia) Nova Widianto (Indonesia) Liliyana Natsir	21–17, 21–23, 13–21	(silver) Runner-up
2008	German Open	(South Korea) Lee Yong-dae	(China) He Hanbin (China) Yu Yang	9–21, 27–25, 21–18	(gold) Winner

BWF Grand Prix Gold tournament
BWF Grand Prix tournament

=== BWF International Challenge/Series/Satellite (8 titles, 2 runners-up) ===
Women's doubles
Year	Tournament	Partner	Opponent	Score	Result
1997	Korea International	(South Korea) Jun Woul-sik	(South Korea) Choi Young-eun (South Korea) Lee Ji-sun	15–5, 15–9	(gold) Winner
1998	Sri Lanka International	(South Korea) Jun Woul-sik	(India) Madhumita Bisht (India) Sindhu Gulati	15–10, 15–5	(gold) Winner
1999	Hungarian International	(South Korea) Yim Kyung-jin	(South Korea) Jung Yeon-kyung (South Korea) Kim So-yeon	15–9, 15–13	(gold) Winner
1999	Australian International	(South Korea) Ra Kyung-min	(South Korea) Chung Jae-hee (South Korea) Yim Kyung-jin	17–16, 6–15, 15–3	(gold) Winner
1999	Norwegian International	(South Korea) Yim Kyung-jin	(South Korea) Jung Yeon-kyung (South Korea) Kim So-yeon	15–7, 15–3	(gold) Winner
2009	Korea International	(South Korea) Lee Kyung-won	(South Korea) Jung Kyung-eun (South Korea) Yoo Hyun-young	19–21, 10–21	(silver) Runner-up

Mixed doubles
Year	Tournament	Partner	Opponent	Score	Result
1997	Korea International	(South Korea) Choi Min-ho	(Malaysia) Norhasikin Amin (Malaysia) Pang Cheh Chang	15–8, 15–9	(gold) Winner
1998	Sri Lanka International	(South Korea) Choi Min-ho	(South Korea) Jung Sung-gyun (South Korea) Jun Woul-sik	15–13, 17–15	(gold) Winner
1999	Hungarian International	(South Korea) Yim Bang-eun	(South Korea) Kim Yong-hyun (South Korea) Yim Kyung-jin	15–5, 9–15, 3–15	(silver) Runner-up
2009	Korea International	(South Korea) Lee Yong-dae	(South Korea) Ko Sung-hyun (South Korea) Ha Jung-eun	21–14, 15–21, 21–9	(gold) Winner

BWF International Challenge tournament
BWF International Series tournament
