= 2014 BWF World Championships – Mixed doubles =

Mixed Doubles at the 2014 BWF World Championships
- Venue: Ballerup Super Arena
- Location: Copenhagen, Denmark
- Dates: August 25, 2014 – August 31, 2014

Medalists
gold medal	Zhang Nan; Zhao Yunlei	China
silver medal	Xu Chen; Ma Jin	China
bronze medal	Joachim Fischer Nielsen; Christinna Pedersen	Denmark
bronze medal	Liu Cheng; Bao Yixin	China

The mixed doubles tournament of the 2014 Copenhagen World Championships (World Badminton Championships) took place from August 25 to 31, 2014. Defending champions Tontowi Ahmad and Lilyana Natsir did not enter the competition.

== Seeds ==
1. (China) Zhang Nan / Zhao Yunlei (champion)
2. (China) Xu Chen / Ma Jin (final)
3. (Denmark) Joachim Fischer Nielsen / Christinna Pedersen (semifinals)
4. (England) Chris Adcock / Gabby Adcock (third round)
5. (South Korea) Ko Sung-hyun / Kim Ha-na (third round)
6. (Germany) Michael Fuchs / Birgit Michels (third round)
7. (Thailand) Sudket Prapakamol / Saralee Thungthongkam (quarterfinals)
8. (Indonesia) Markis Kido / Pia Zebadiah Bernadet (second round)

9. (Singapore) Danny Bawa Chrisnanta / Vanessa Neo (third round)
10. (China) Lu Kai / Huang Yaqiong (quarterfinals)
11. (Hong Kong) Lee Chun Hei / Chau Hoi Wah (quarterfinals)
12. (Scotland) Robert Blair / Imogen Bankier (second round)
13. (Japan) Kenichi Hayakawa / Misaki Matsutomo (second round)
14. (China) Liu Cheng / Bao Yixin (semifinals)
15. (Indonesia) Riky Widianto / Richi Puspita Dili (third round)
16. (Thailand) Maneepong Jongjit / Sapsiree Taerattanachai (third round)

Click on the seed number of a player to go to their draw section.

== Draw ==
=== Finals ===
Quarterfinals
1	(China) Zhang Nan (China) Zhao Yunlei	21	21
7	(Thailand) Sudket Prapakamol (Thailand) Saralee Thungthongkam	13	19
14	(China) Liu Cheng (China) Bao Yixin	21	21
10	(China) Lu Kai (China) Huang Yaqiong	14	17
(Indonesia) Praveen Jordan (Indonesia) Debby Susanto	12	22	18
3	(Denmark) Joachim Fischer Nielsen (Denmark) Christinna Pedersen	21	20	21
11	(Hong Kong) Lee Chun Hei (Hong Kong) Chau Hoi Wah	18	11
2	(China) Xu Chen (China) Ma Jin	21	21

Semifinals
1	(China) Zhang Nan (China) Zhao Yunlei	21	21
14	(China) Liu Cheng (China) Bao Yixin	15	13
3	(Denmark) Joachim Fischer Nielsen (Denmark) Christinna Pedersen	15	9
2	(China) Xu Chen (China) Ma Jin	21	21

Final
1	(China) Zhang Nan (China) Zhao Yunlei	21	21	21
2	(China) Xu Chen (China) Ma Jin	12	23	13

=== Section 1 ===
First Round
(Chinese Taipei) Chen H-l (Chinese Taipei) Cheng W-h	24	21
(Republic of Ireland) S Magee (Republic of Ireland) C Magee	22	17
(Brazil) D Paiola (Brazil) P B Pereira	15	17
(Austria) R Zirnwald (Austria) E Baldauf	21	21
(New Zealand) O Leydon-Davis (New Zealand) S Leydon-Davis	15	17
(Russia) V Durkin (Russia) N Vislova	21	21
(Denmark) A Kristiansen (Denmark) J Houmann	21	27
(India) T Kona (India) A Ponnappa	16	25

Second Round
1	(China) Zhang N (China) Zhao YL	21	20	21
(Chinese Taipei) Chen H-l (Chinese Taipei) Cheng W-h	16	22	12
15	(Indonesia) R Widianto (Indonesia) R P Dili	21	21
(Austria) R Zirnwald (Austria) E Baldauf	18	10
7	(Thailand) S Prapakamol (Thailand) S Thungthongkam	22	21
(Russia) V Durkin (Russia) N Vislova	20	13
13	(Japan) K Hayakawa (Japan) M Matsutomo	9	22	11
(Denmark) A Kristiansen (Denmark) J Houmann	21	20	21

Third Round
1	(China) Zhang N (China) Zhao YL	21	21
15	(Indonesia) R Widianto (Indonesia) R P Dili	15	14
7	(Thailand) S Prapakamol (Thailand) S Thungthongkam	21	23	21
(Denmark) A Kristiansen (Denmark) J Houmann	19	25	11

Quarterfinals
1	(China) Zhang N (China) Zhao YL	21	21
7	(Thailand) S Prapakamol (Thailand) S Thungthongkam	13	9

=== Section 2 ===
First Round
(Malaysia) Tan A Q (Malaysia) Lai P J	21	21
(Hong Kong) Chan Y L (Hong Kong) Tse Y S	14	17
(Australia) R Smith (Australia) R Veeran	21	16	9
(Denmark) N Nøhr (Denmark) S Thygesen	19	21	21
(Czech Republic) J Bitman (Czech Republic) A Bášová	21	21
(Egypt) A Kashkal (Egypt) H Hosny	12	13
(Netherlands) J de Ruiter (Netherlands) S Barning	21	22
(Germany) P Käsbauer (Germany) I Herttrich	16	20

Second Round
4	(England) C Adcock (England) G Adcock	21	21
(Malaysia) Tan A Q (Malaysia) Lai P J	16	9
14	(China) Liu C (China) Bao YX	21	21
(Denmark) N Nøhr (Denmark) S Thygesen	13	19
5	(South Korea) Ko S-h (South Korea) Kim H-n	21	21
(Czech Republic) J Bitman (Czech Republic) A Bášová	6	13
10	(China) Lu K (China) Huang YQ	21	21
(Netherlands) J de Ruiter (Netherlands) S Barning	12	16

Third Round
4	(England) C Adcock (England) G Adcock	16	24
14	(China) Liu C (China) Bao YX	21	26
5	(South Korea) Ko S-h (South Korea) Kim H-n	21	18	13
10	(China) Lu K (China) Huang YQ	18	21	21

Quarterfinals
14	(China) Liu C (China) Bao YX	21	21
10	(China) Lu K (China) Huang YQ	14	17

=== Section 3 ===
First Round
(United States) P Chew (United States) J Subandhi	9	14
(Russia) A Yartsev (Russia) E Kosetskaya	21	21
(Indonesia) P Jordan (Indonesia) D Susanto	22	21
(Japan) H Hashimoto (Japan) M Maeda	20	18
(Sweden) J Nordh (Sweden) E Lennartsson	21	21
(Indonesia) M F Gideon (Indonesia) R A Pradipta	18	11
(Netherlands) J Arends (Netherlands) S Piek	21	21
(Poland) R Mateusiak (Poland) A Wojtkowska	19	14

Second Round
(Russia) A Yartsev (Russia) E Kosetskaya	23	21
12	(Scotland) R Blair (Scotland) I Bankier	21	15
(Indonesia) P Jordan (Indonesia) D Susanto	21	21
8	(Indonesia) M Kido (Indonesia) P Z Bernadet	12	12
(Sweden) J Nordh (Sweden) E Lennartsson	8	10
16	(Thailand) M Jongjit (Thailand) S Taerattanachai	21	21
(Netherlands) J Arends (Netherlands) S Piek	13	19
3	(Denmark) J Fischer Nielsen (Denmark) C Pedersen	21	21

Third Round
(Russia) A Yartsev (Russia) E Kosetskaya	17	13
(Indonesia) P Jordan (Indonesia) D Susanto	21	21
16	(Thailand) M Jongjit (Thailand) S Taerattanachai	15	5
3	(Denmark) J Fischer Nielsen (Denmark) C Pedersen	21	21

Quarterfinals
(Indonesia) P Jordan (Indonesia) D Susanto	12	22	18
3	(Denmark) J Fischer Nielsen (Denmark) C Pedersen	21	20	21

=== Section 4 ===
First Round
(South Korea) Kim K-j (South Korea) Kim S-y	21	15	18
(Chinese Taipei) Liao M-c (Chinese Taipei) Chen H-h	14	21	21
(India) A Vishnu (India) A Balan	21	21
(Brazil) H Arthuso (Brazil) F Silva	12	14
(Canada) T Ng (Canada) A Bruce	6	13
(England) C Langridge (England) H Olver	21	21
(Denmark) M Pieler Kolding (Denmark) K Rytter Juhl	21	21
(Australia) R Tam (Australia) G Somerville	10	9

Second Round
(Chinese Taipei) Liao M-c (Chinese Taipei) Chen H-h	18	23
11	(Hong Kong) Lee C H (Hong Kong) Chau H W	21	25
(India) A Vishnu (India) A Balan	14	11
6	(Germany) M Fuchs (Germany) B Michels	21	21
(England) C Langridge (England) H Olver	15	14
9	(Singapore) D B Chrisnanta (Singapore) V Neo	21	21
(Denmark) M Pieler Kolding (Denmark) K Rytter Juhl	17	15
2	(China) Xu C (China) Ma J	21	21

Third Round
11	(Hong Kong) Lee C H (Hong Kong) Chau H W	21	16	21
6	(Germany) M Fuchs (Germany) B Michels	18	21	8
9	(Singapore) D B Chrisnanta (Singapore) V Neo	14	18
2	(China) Xu C (China) Ma J	21	21

Quarterfinals
11	(Hong Kong) Lee C H (Hong Kong) Chau H W	18	11
2	(China) Xu C (China) Ma J	21	21
