= 2014 BWF World Championships – Women's doubles =

Women's doubles at the 2014 BWF World Championships
- Venue: Ballerup Super Arena
- Location: Copenhagen, Denmark
- Dates: August 25, 2014 – August 31, 2014

Medalists
gold medal	Tian Qing; Zhao Yunlei	China
silver medal	Wang Xiaoli; Yu Yang	China
bronze medal	Lee So-hee; Shin Seung-chan	South Korea
bronze medal	Reika Kakiiwa; Miyuki Maeda	Japan

The women's doubles tournament of the 2014 Copenhagen World Championships (World Badminton Championships) took place from August 25 to 31. Wang Xiaoli and Yu Yang enter the competition as the current champions.

== Seeds ==
1. (China) Bao Yixin / Tang Jinhua (second round)
2. (Denmark) Christinna Pedersen / Kamilla Rytter Juhl (third round)
3. (Japan) Misaki Matsutomo / Ayaka Takahashi (third round)
4. (China) Wang Xiaoli / Yu Yang (final)
5. (China) Tian Qing / Zhao Yunlei (champion)
6. (South Korea) Jang Ye-na / Kim So-young (quarterfinals)
7. (Japan) Reika Kakiiwa / Miyuki Maeda (semifinals)
8. (China) Luo Ying / Luo Yu (quarterfinals)

9. (South Korea) Jung Kyung-eun / Kim Ha-na (third round)
10. (Indonesia) Nitya Krishinda Maheswari / Greysia Polii (quarterfinals)
11. (Indonesia) Pia Zebadiah Bernadet / Rizki Amelia Pradipta (third round)
12. (Thailand) Duanganong Aroonkesorn / Kunchala Voravichitchaikul (third round)
13. (South Korea) Ko A-ra / Yoo Hae-won (third round)
14. (Netherlands) Eefje Muskens / Selena Piek (third round)
15. (Denmark) Line Damkjær Kruse / Marie Røpke (third round)
16. (South Korea) Lee So-hee / Shin Seung-chan (semifinals)

Click on the seed number of a player to go to their draw section.

== Draw ==
=== Finals ===
Quarterfinals
(Indonesia) Anggia Shitta Awanda (Indonesia) Della Destiara Haris	12	15
5	(China) Tian Qing (China) Zhao Yunlei	21	21
16	(South Korea) Lee So-hee (South Korea) Shin Seung-chan	21	16	21
6	(South Korea) Jang Ye-na (South Korea) Kim So-young	11	21	10
8	(China) Luo Ying (China) Luo Yu	11	11
4	(China) Wang Xiaoli (China) Yu Yang	21	21
7	(Japan) Reika Kakiiwa (Japan) Miyuki Maeda	21	21
10	(Indonesia) Nitya Krishinda Maheswari (Indonesia) Greysia Polii	19	13

Semifinals
5	(China) Tian Qing (China) Zhao Yunlei	21	21
16	(South Korea) Lee So-hee (South Korea) Shin Seung-chan	13	10
4	(China) Wang Xiaoli (China) Yu Yang	21	21
7	(Japan) Reika Kakiiwa (Japan) Miyuki Maeda	8	13

Final
5	(China) Tian Qing (China) Zhao Yunlei	21	21
4	(China) Wang Xiaoli (China) Yu Yang	19	15

=== Section 1 ===
First Round
(Singapore) Fu MT (Singapore) V Neo	18	19
(Indonesia) A S Awanda (Indonesia) D D Haris	21	21
(Malaysia) V Hoo (Malaysia) Woon K W	21	21
(Czech Republic) Š Křížková (Czech Republic) K Tomalová	11	12
(England) H Olver (England) K Robertshaw
(India) J Gutta (India) A Ponnappa	w	/	o
(Germany) J Goliszewski (Germany) B Michels	21	21
(Ukraine) N Voytsekh (Ukraine) Y Zharka	15	12

Second Round
1	(China) Bao YX (China) Tang JH	14	18
(Indonesia) A S Awanda (Indonesia) D D Haris	21	21
15	(Denmark) L Damkjær Kruse (Denmark) M Rœpke	21	11	21
(Malaysia) V Hoo (Malaysia) Woon K W	16	21	10
5	(China) Tian Q (China) Zhao YL	21	21
(India) J Gutta (India) A Ponnappa	16	8
12	(Thailand) D Aroonkesorn (Thailand) K Voravichitchaikul	20	21	21
(Germany) J Goliszewski (Germany) B Michels	22	19	14

Third Round
(Indonesia) A S Awanda (Indonesia) D D Haris	21	21
15	(Denmark) L Damkjær Kruse (Denmark) M Rœpke	18	16
5	(China) Tian Q (China) Zhao YL	21	21
12	(Thailand) D Aroonkesorn (Thailand) K Voravichitchaikul	13	12

Quarterfinals
(Indonesia) A S Awanda (Indonesia) D D Haris	12	15
5	(China) Tian Q (China) Zhao YL	21	21

=== Section 2 ===
First Round
(New Zealand) A Rankin (New Zealand) M Stapleton	7	7
(Russia) I Khlebko (Russia) K Polikarpova	21	21
(Indonesia) S R Andini (Indonesia) T R Nuraidah	19	21	21
(Scotland) I Bankier (Bulgaria) P Nedelcheva	21	9	12
(Chinese Taipei) Cheng W-h (Chinese Taipei) Hsieh P-c	19	21	21
(Bulgaria) G Stoeva (Bulgaria) S Stoeva	21	5	16
(United States) E Lee (United States) P L Obañana	21	21	14
(Netherlands) S Barning (Netherlands) I Tabeling	23	14	21

Second Round
3	(Japan) M Matsutomo (Japan) A Takahashi	21	21
(Russia) I Khlebko (Russia) K Polikarpova	13	13
16	(South Korea) Lee S-h (South Korea) Shin S-c	21	21
(Indonesia) S R Andini (Indonesia) T R Nuraidah	12	16
6	(South Korea) Jang Y-n (South Korea) Kim S-y	23	21
(Chinese Taipei) Cheng W-h (Chinese Taipei) Hsieh P-c	21	17
11	(Indonesia) P Z Bernadet (Indonesia) R A Pradipta	23	18	21
(Netherlands) S Barning (Netherlands) I Tabeling	21	21	14

Third Round
3	(Japan) M Matsutomo (Japan) A Takahashi	14	15
16	(South Korea) Lee S-h (South Korea) Shin S-c	21	21
6	(South Korea) Jang Y-n (South Korea) Kim S-y	21	21
11	(Indonesia) P Z Bernadet (Indonesia) R A Pradipta	18	13

Quarterfinals
16	(South Korea) Lee S-h (South Korea) Shin S-c	21	16	21
6	(South Korea) Jang Y-n (South Korea) Kim S-y	11	21	10

=== Section 3 ===
First Round
(Nigeria) T D Atolagbe (Nigeria) F Azeez	4	10
(Malaysia) Ng H E (Malaysia) Ng H L	21	21
(Malaysia) Lim Y L (Malaysia) Lee M Y	21	21
(England) G Adcock (England) L Smith	9	19
(Australia) J Guan (Australia) G Somerville	21	21
(Brazil) P B Pereira (Brazil) L Vicente	15	14
(Japan) M Aratama (Japan) M Taruno	12	18
(Malaysia) A A Anscelly (Malaysia) Soong F C	21	21

Second Round
(Malaysia) Ng H E (Malaysia) Ng H L	17	20
14	(Netherlands) E Muskens (Netherlands) S Piek	21	22
(Malaysia) Lim Y L (Malaysia) Lee M Y	7	15
8	(China) Luo Y (China) Luo Y	21	21
(Australia) J Guan (Australia) G Somerville	10	9
6	(South Korea) Jung K-e (South Korea) Kim H-n	21	21
(Malaysia) A A Anscelly (Malaysia) Soong F C	14	16
4	(China) Wang XL (China) Yu Y	21	21

Third Round
14	(Netherlands) E Muskens (Netherlands) S Piek	8	21	15
8	(China) Luo Y (China) Luo Y	21	18	21
6	(South Korea) Jung K-e (South Korea) Kim H-n	12	18
4	(China) Wang XL (China) Yu Y	21	21

Quarterfinals
8	(China) Luo Y (China) Luo Y	11	11
4	(China) Wang XL (China) Yu Y	21	21

=== Section 4 ===
First Round
(Russia) A Chervaykova (Russia) N Vislova	22	21
(Canada) A Bruce (Canada) P Chan	20	19
(Chinese Taipei) Chen H-h (Chinese Taipei) Lai C-w	20	18
(Japan) Y Miki (Japan) K Yonemoto	22	21
(Germany) I Herttrich (Germany) C Nelte	21	21
(Switzerland) A Huser (Switzerland) S Jacquet	16	14
(India) P Sawant (India) A S Sunil
(Thailand) P Supajirakul (Thailand) S Taerattanachai	w	/	o

Second Round
(Russia) A Chervaykova (Russia) N Vislova
13	(South Korea) Ko A-r (South Korea) Yoo H-w	wo
(Japan) Y Miki (Japan) K Yonemoto	16	17
7	(Japan) R Kakiiwa (Japan) M Maeda	21	21
(Germany) I Herttrich (Germany) C Nelte	10	11
10	(Indonesia) N K Maheswari (Indonesia) G Polii	21	21
(Thailand) P Supajirakul (Thailand) S Taerattanachai	12	16
2	(Denmark) C Pedersen (Denmark) K Rytter Juhl	21	21

Third Round
13	(South Korea) Ko A-r (South Korea) Yoo H-w	21	15	13
7	(Japan) R Kakiiwa (Japan) M Maeda	19	21	21
10	(Indonesia) N K Maheswari (Indonesia) G Polii	21	21
2	(Denmark) C Pedersen (Denmark) K Rytter Juhl	15	19

Quarterfinals
7	(Japan) R Kakiiwa (Japan) M Maeda	21	21
10	(Indonesia) N K Maheswari (Indonesia) G Polii	19	13
