= Zhang Nan (badminton) =

Chinese badminton player (born 1990)

Zhang Nan 张楠
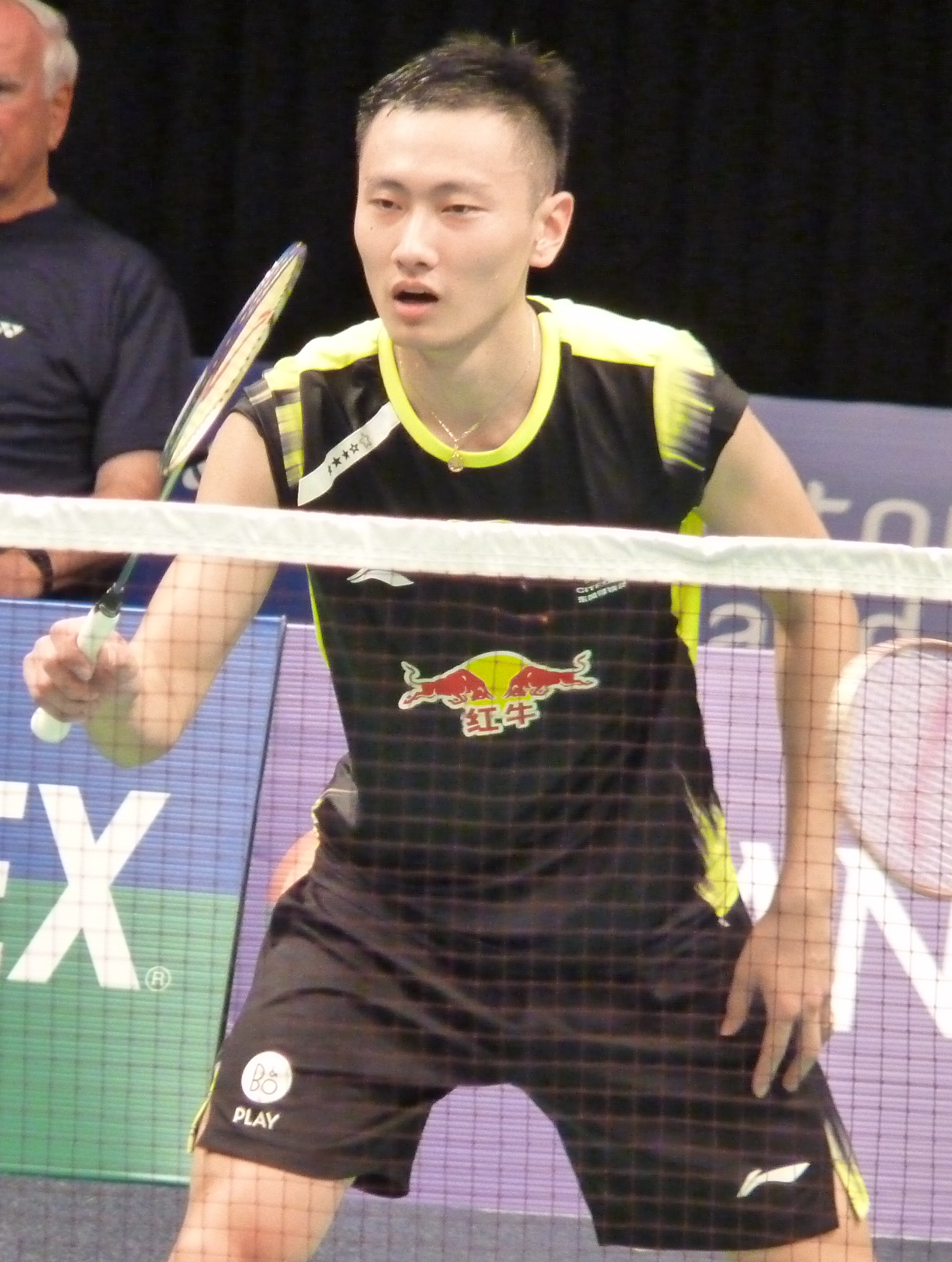

Personal information
- Born: 1 March 1990 (age 36) Beijing, China
- Height: 1.83 m (6 ft 0 in)
- Weight: 74 kg (163 lb)
- Spouse: Tian Qing (m. 2018)

Sport
- Country: China
- Sport: Badminton
- Handedness: Right
- Coached by: Zhang Jun

Men's & mixed doubles
- Highest ranking: 2 (MD with Fu Haifeng 29 September 2016); 2 (MD with Liu Cheng 21 June 2018); 1 (XD with Zhao Yunlei 27 January 2011); 3 (XD with Li Yinhui 24 August 2017)
- BWF profile
Medal record
Men's badminton
Representing China
Olympic Games
Gold medal – first place	2012 London	Mixed doubles
Gold medal – first place	2016 Rio de Janeiro	Men's doubles
Bronze medal – third place	2016 Rio de Janeiro	Mixed doubles
World Championships
Gold medal – first place	2011 London	Mixed doubles
Gold medal – first place	2014 Copenhagen	Mixed doubles
Gold medal – first place	2015 Jakarta	Mixed doubles
Gold medal – first place	2017 Glasgow	Men's doubles
Bronze medal – third place	2013 Guangzhou	Mixed doubles
Bronze medal – third place	2018 Nanjing	Men's doubles
Bronze medal – third place	2018 Nanjing	Mixed doubles
Sudirman Cup
Gold medal – first place	2011 Qingdao	Mixed team
Gold medal – first place	2013 Kuala Lumpur	Mixed team
Gold medal – first place	2015 Donggguan	Mixed team
Silver medal – second place	2017 Gold Coast	Mixed team
Thomas Cup
Gold medal – first place	2010 Kuala Lumpur	Men's team
Gold medal – first place	2018 Bangkok	Men's team
Bronze medal – third place	2014 New Delhi	Men's team
Asian Games
Gold medal – first place	2010 Guangzhou	Men's team
Gold medal – first place	2014 Incheon	Mixed doubles
Gold medal – first place	2018 Jakarta–Palembang	Men's team
Silver medal – second place	2010 Guangzhou	Mixed doubles
Silver medal – second place	2014 Incheon	Men's team
Asian Championships
Gold medal – first place	2011 Chengdu	Mixed doubles
Gold medal – first place	2012 Qingdao	Mixed doubles
Gold medal – first place	2016 Wuhan	Mixed doubles
Silver medal – second place	2013 Taipei	Mixed doubles
Bronze medal – third place	2011 Chengdu	Men's doubles
Bronze medal – third place	2016 Wuhan	Men's doubles
Bronze medal – third place	2018 Wuhan	Men's doubles
Bronze medal – third place	2018 Wuhan	Mixed doubles
Asia Mixed Team Championships
Bronze medal – third place	2017 Ho Chi Minh	Mixed team
East Asian Games
Gold medal – first place	2009 Hong Kong	Men's team
Silver medal – second place	2009 Hong Kong	Mixed doubles
Bronze medal – third place	2009 Hong Kong	Men's doubles
World Junior Championships
Gold medal – first place	2007 Waitakere City	Mixed team
Gold medal – first place	2008 Pune	Mixed team
Silver medal – second place	2008 Pune	Mixed doubles
Asian Junior Championships
Gold medal – first place	2008 Kuala Lumpur	Mixed doubles
Gold medal – first place	2008 Kuala Lumpur	Mixed team
Silver medal – second place	2007 Kuala Lumpur	Mixed team
Bronze medal – third place	2007 Kuala Lumpur	Boys' doubles
Bronze medal – third place	2008 Kuala Lumpur	Boys' doubles

Zhang Nan (simplified Chinese: 张楠; traditional Chinese: 張楠; pinyin: Zhāng Nán; born 1 March 1990) is a Chinese former professional badminton player who specializes in both men's and mixed doubles. He found much success in mixed doubles with his former partner Zhao Yunlei. They won gold in 2012 Summer Olympics, 3 golds in BWF World Championships in 2011, 2014 and 2015 and a gold at the 2014 Asian Games. Having won all major events as a pair, they are considered one of the most successful mixed doubles pairs of all time. Zhang Nan himself is considered to be one of the all-time greats of badminton.

Having found huge success in mixed doubles with Zhao, Zhang partnered Fu Haifeng with whom he won gold in 2016 Summer Olympics. After this, Fu retired and Zhang partnered Liu Cheng and became World Champion in the men's doubles at the 2017 BWF World Championships.

== Career ==
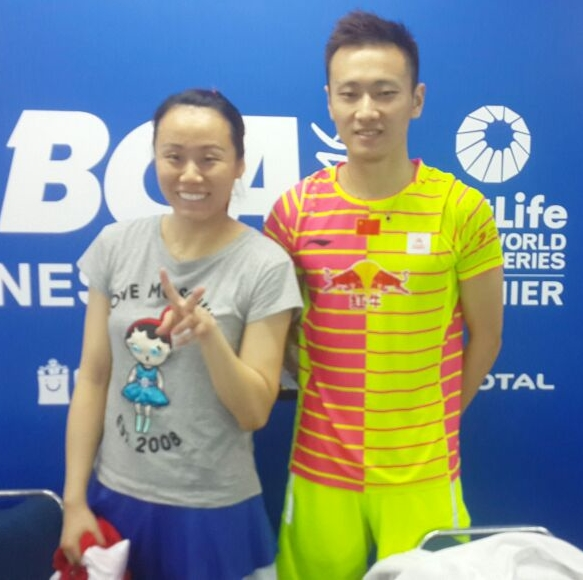
Zhang Nan (right) and Zhao Yunlei (left) at the 2016 Indonesia Super Series Premier

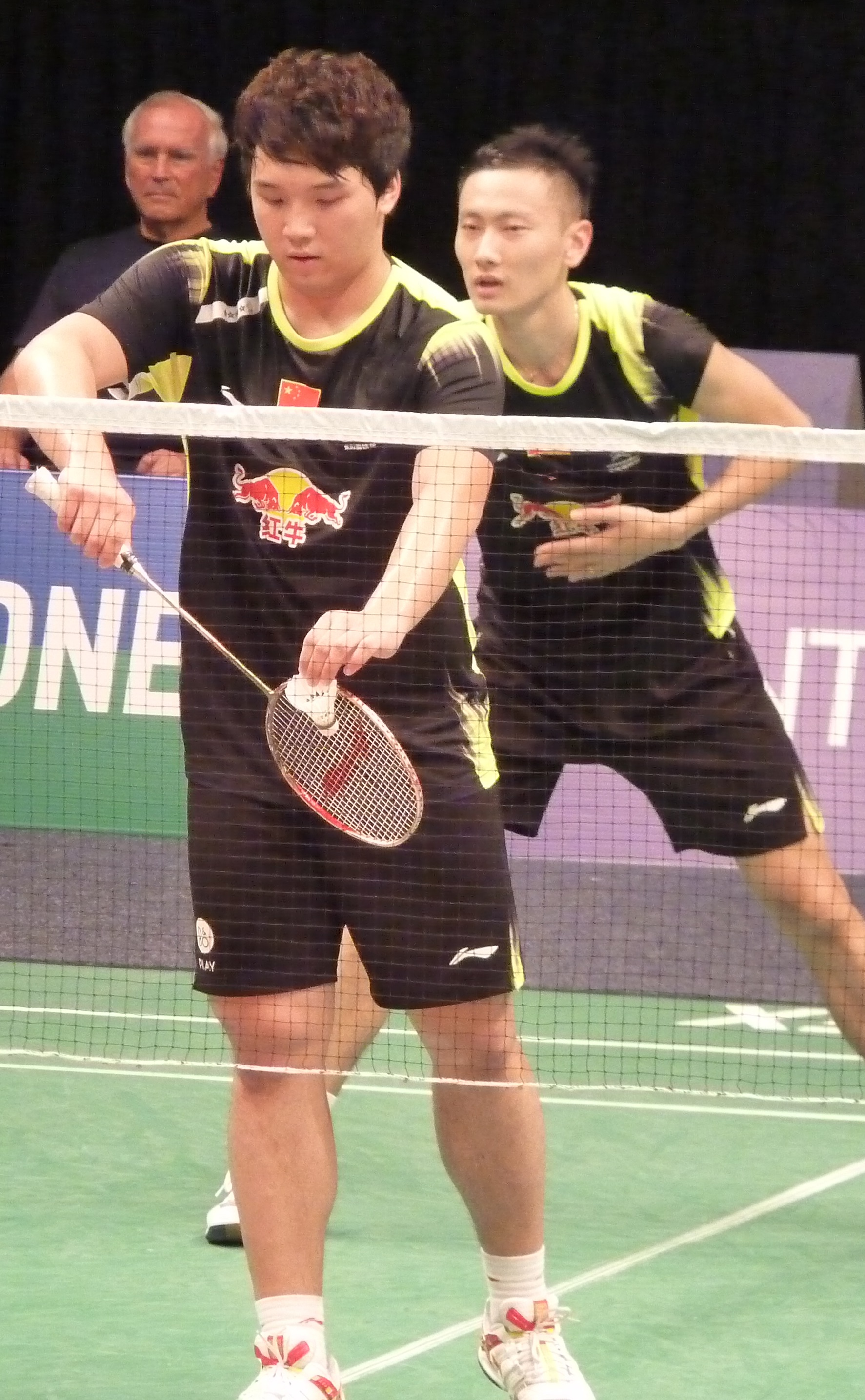
Zhang Nan playing with Li Gen at the 2013 Dutch Open

Zhang Nan is a badminton player who has achieved success in both men's and mixed doubles. In the men's doubles he has been paired with Chai Biao, Fu Haifeng, Lu Kai, Liu Cheng and Ou Xuanyi; while in the mixed doubles he has been paired with Lu Lu, Tang Jinhua, Zhao Yunlei and Li Yinhui.

=== 2010 ===
He participated in the 2010 Thomas Cup in Kuala Lumpur, playing for China. He also played in 2010 Asian Games in Guangzhou.

Zhang has achieved one of the three most prestigious badminton titles, winning the All England Open that year with Zhao Yunlei, winning over Nova Widianto and Liliyana Natsir of Indonesia, 21–18, 23–25, 21–18, the first pair to win the title as qualifiers.

Zhang has a larger achievement with Zhao in the mixed doubles event rather than with Chai. Zhang and Zhao won the Japan Open title, beating compatriots Tao Jiaming and Tian Qing in the final, 21–19, 22–20. Meanwhile, Zhang and Chai's journey in Tokyo was ended by seniors Cai Yun and Fu Haifeng in the semi-finals, losing 17–21 and 16–21.

In China Open, Zhang attended the men's and mixed doubles finals but he lost in both events. In the men's doubles, South Korea's Jung Jae-sung and Lee Yong-dae emerged as the winners as they downed Zhang and Chai in straight sets, 21–15 and 21–12. In the mixed doubles final, Tao Jiaming and Tian Qing took revenge with a 21–18, 21–17 triumph over Zhang and Zhao.

Zhang only played in mixed doubles in the last Super Series tournament of 2010, Hong Kong Open. Seeded fifth, he and Zhao reached the final but lost in a long three-set match against Joachim Fischer Nielsen and Christinna Pedersen of Denmark 20–22, 21–14, and 20–22.

=== 2011 ===
Zhang and Zhao were qualified to play in the 2010 Super Series Finals Taiwan. They became the winner by beating Thailand's Sudket Prapakamol and Saralee Thungthongkam 21–17, 21–12 in the final. Zhang and Chai also played in the Super Series Finals, yet both were conquered by Jung Jae-sung and Lee Yong-dae in the last four 15–21 and 11–21 in just 30 minutes.

Once again, Zhang and Zhao met Tao Jiaming and Tian Qing, now in Korea Open final. Zhang and Zhao vanquished their teammates 21–17, 13–21, and 21–19 to become the first winners of a Super Series Premier.

=== 2012 ===
In July–August at the London Olympics, he won the gold medal at the mixed doubles event with Zhao Yunlei, beating compatriots Xu Chen and Ma Jin in the gold medal match, 21–11, 21–17.

=== 2016 ===
At the 2016 Olympics, Zhang and Zhao, the defending champions in the mixed doubles event, lost in the semi-final, but successfully clinched a bronze medal after winning a rematch of the last edition's final, beating Xu Chen and Ma Jin in straight games again. On the other hand, Zhang won the gold medal with Fu Haifeng in the men's doubles event, beating Malaysians Goh V Shem and Tan Wee Kiong in a tightly-fought match, 16–21, 21–11, 23–21. They saved two gold medal points during the third game, and eventually converted one on their first opportunity.

=== 2017 ===
Zhang won the World Championships in the men's doubles event with Liu Cheng, defeating Indonesians Mohammad Ahsan and Rian Agung Saputro in the final, 21–10, 21–17 to win the gold medal.

=== 2022: Resignation from the Chinese national badminton team ===
Zhang announced his resignation from the Chinese national team in late August on his Weibo account, stating that he would continue to play badminton as an independent player with the permission of the Chinese Badminton Association.

=== 2023 ===
Zhang made his return to the international badminton circuit as an independent player by participating in the men's and mixed doubles events in the 2023 Ruichang China Masters.

== Achievements ==
=== Olympic Games ===
Men's doubles
Year	Venue	Partner	Opponent	Score	Result
2016	Riocentro – Pavilion 4, Rio de Janeiro, Brazil	(China) Fu Haifeng	(Malaysia) Goh V Shem (Malaysia) Tan Wee Kiong	16–21, 21–11, 23–21	Gold

Mixed doubles
Year	Venue	Partner	Opponent	Score	Result
2012	Wembley Arena, London, Great Britain	(China) Zhao Yunlei	(China) Xu Chen (China) Ma Jin	21–11, 21–17	Gold
2016	Riocentro – Pavilion 4, Rio de Janeiro, Brazil	(China) Zhao Yunlei	(China) Xu Chen (China) Ma Jin	21–7, 21–11	Bronze

=== BWF World Championships ===
Men's doubles
Year	Venue	Partner	Opponent	Score	Result
2017	Emirates Arena, Glasgow, Scotland	(China) Liu Cheng	(Indonesia) Mohammad Ahsan (Indonesia) Rian Agung Saputro	21–10, 21–17	Gold
2018	Nanjing Youth Olympic Sports Park; Nanjing, China	(China) Liu Cheng	(China) Li Junhui (China) Liu Yuchen	15–21, 13–21	Bronze

Mixed doubles
Year	Venue	Partner	Opponent	Score	Result
2011	Wembley Arena, London, England	(China) Zhao Yunlei	(England) Chris Adcock (Scotland) Imogen Bankier	21–15, 21–7	Gold
2013	Tianhe Sports Center, Guangzhou, China	(China) Zhao Yunlei	(Indonesia) Tontowi Ahmad (Indonesia) Lilyana Natsir	21–15, 18–21, 13–21	Bronze
2014	Ballerup Super Arena, Copenhagen, Denmark	(China) Zhao Yunlei	(China) Xu Chen (China) Ma Jin	21–12, 21–23, 21–13	Gold
2015	Istora Senayan, Jakarta, Indonesia	(China) Zhao Yunlei	(China) Liu Cheng (China) Bao Yixin	21–17, 21–11	Gold
2018	Nanjing Youth Olympic Sports Park; Nanjing, China	(China) Li Yinhui	(China) Zheng Siwei (China) Huang Yaqiong	21–19, 12–21, 10–21	Bronze

=== Asian Games ===
Mixed doubles
Year	Venue	Partner	Opponent	Score	Result
2010	Tianhe Gymnasium, Guangzhou, China	(China) Zhao Yunlei	(South Korea) Shin Baek-cheol (South Korea) Lee Hyo-jung	19–21, 14–21	Silver
2014	Gyeyang Gymnasium, Incheon, South Korea	(China) Zhao Yunlei	(Indonesia) Tontowi Ahmad (Indonesia) Liliyana Natsir	21–16, 21–14	Gold

=== Asian Championships ===
Men's doubles
Year	Venue	Partner	Opponent	Score	Result
2011	Sichuan Gymnasium; Chengdu, China	(China) Xu Chen	(China) Cai Yun (China) Fu Haifeng	19–21, 15–21	Bronze
2016	Wuhan Sports Center Gymnasium; Wuhan, China	(China) Fu Haifeng	(China) Li Junhui (China) Liu Yuchen	21–23, 19–21	Bronze
2018	Wuhan Sports Center Gymnasium; Wuhan, China	(China) Liu Cheng	(Japan) Takeshi Kamura (Japan) Keigo Sonoda	21–14, 12–21, 23–25	Bronze

Mixed doubles
Year	Venue	Partner	Opponent	Score	Result
2011	Sichuan Gymnasium; Chengdu, China	(China) Zhao Yunlei	(China) Xu Chen (China) Ma Jin	15–21, 21–15, 25–23	Gold
2012	Qingdao Sports Centre Conson Stadium; Qingdao, China	(China) Zhao Yunlei	(China) Xu Chen (China) Ma Jin	21–13, 21–12	Gold
2013	Taipei Arena; Taipei, Taiwan	(China) Zhao Yunlei	(South Korea) Ko Sung-hyun (South Korea) Kim Ha-na	20–22, 17–21	Silver
2016	Wuhan Sports Center Gymnasium; Wuhan, China	(China) Zhao Yunlei	(Indonesia) Tontowi Ahmad (Indonesia) Liliyana Natsir	16–21, 21–9, 21–17	Gold
2018	Wuhan Sports Center Gymnasium; Wuhan, China	(China) Li Yinhui	(China) Wang Yilyu (China) Huang Dongping	21–18, 18–21, 17–21	Bronze

=== East Asian Games ===
Men's doubles
Year	Venue	Partner	Opponent	Score	Result
2009	Queen Elizabeth Stadium, Hong Kong	(China) Chai Biao	(Chinese Taipei) Chen Hung-ling (Chinese Taipei) Lin Yu-lang	18–21, 16–21	Bronze

=== BWF World Junior Championships ===
Mixed doubles
Year	Venue	Partner	Opponent	Score	Result
2008	Shree Shiv Chhatrapati Badminton Hall; Pune, India	(China) Lu Lu	(China) Chai Biao (China) Xie Jing	19–21, 15–21	Silver

=== Asian Junior Championships ===
Boys' doubles
Year	Venue	Partner	Opponent	Score	Result
2007	Stadium Juara; Kuala Lumpur, Malaysia	(China) Qiu Zihan	(Malaysia) Mohd Lutfi Zaim Abdul Khalid (Malaysia) Tan Wee Kiong	10–21, 13–21	Bronze
2008	Stadium Juara; Kuala Lumpur, Malaysia	(China) Chai Biao	(Malaysia) Mak Hee Chun (Malaysia) Teo Kok Siang	17–21, 18–21	Bronze

Mixed doubles
Year	Venue	Partner	Opponent	Score	Result
2008	Stadium Juara; Kuala Lumpur, Malaysia	(China) Lu Lu	(South Korea) Kim Ki-jung (South Korea) Eom Hye-won	14–21, 21–15, 24–22	Gold

=== BWF World Tour (2 titles, 1 runner-up) ===
The BWF World Tour, which was announced on 19 March 2017 and implemented in 2018, is a series of elite badminton tournaments sanctioned by the Badminton World Federation (BWF). The BWF World Tour is divided into levels of World Tour Finals, Super 1000, Super 750, Super 500, Super 300, and the BWF Tour Super 100.

Men's doubles
Year	Tournament	Level	Partner	Opponent	Score	Result
2019	Akita Masters	Super 100	(China) Ou Xuanyi	(Japan) Akira Koga (Japan) Taichi Saito	21–14, 21–19	(gold) Winner
2019	Indonesia Masters	Super 100	(China) Ou Xuanyi	(Japan) Akira Koga (Japan) Taichi Saito	11–21, 21–10, 22–20	(gold) Winner

Mixed doubles
Year	Tournament	Level	Partner	Opponent	Score	Result
2018	China Open	Super 1000	(China) Li Yinhui	(China) Zheng Siwei (China) Huang Yaqiong	16–21, 9–21	(silver) Runner-up

=== BWF Superseries (31 titles, 15 runners-up) ===
The BWF Superseries, which was launched on 14 December 2006 and implemented in 2007, was a series of elite badminton tournaments, sanctioned by the Badminton World Federation (BWF). BWF Superseries levels were Superseries and Superseries Premier. A season of Superseries consisted of twelve tournaments around the world that had been introduced since 2011. Successful players were invited to the Superseries Finals, which were held at the end of each year.

Men's doubles
Year	Tournament	Partner	Opponent	Score	Result
2010	China Open	(China) Chai Biao	(South Korea) Jung Jae-sung (South Korea) Lee Yong-dae	15–21, 12–21	(silver) Runner-up
2012	China Masters	(China) Chai Biao	(Japan) Hiroyuki Endo (Japan) Kenichi Hayakawa	21–18, 21–17	(gold) Winner
2014	Denmark Open	(China) Fu Haifeng	(South Korea) Lee Yong-dae (South Korea) Yoo Yeon-seong	21–13, 25–23	(gold) Winner
2015	All England Open	(China) Fu Haifeng	(Denmark) Mathias Boe (Denmark) Carsten Mogensen	17–21, 20–22	(silver) Runner-up
2015	Singapore Open	(China) Fu Haifeng	(Indonesia) Angga Pratama (Indonesia) Ricky Karanda Suwardi	15–21, 21–11, 14–21	(silver) Runner-up
2015	Indonesia Open	(China) Fu Haifeng	(South Korea) Ko Sung-hyun (South Korea) Shin Baek-cheol	16–21, 21–16, 19–21	(silver) Runner-up
2015	Japan Open	(China) Fu Haifeng	(South Korea) Lee Yong-dae (South Korea) Yoo Yeon-seong	19–21, 27–29	(silver) Runner-up
2016	Singapore Open	(China) Fu Haifeng	(Japan) Takeshi Kamura (Japan) Keigo Sonoda	21–11, 22–20	(gold) Winner
2017	Denmark Open	(China) Liu Cheng	(Indonesia) Marcus Fernaldi Gideon (Indonesia) Kevin Sanjaya Sukamuljo	21–16, 22–24, 21–19	(gold) Winner
2017	Dubai World Superseries Finals	(China) Liu Cheng	(Indonesia) Marcus Fernaldi Gideon (Indonesia) Kevin Sanjaya Sukamuljo	16–21, 15–21	(silver) Runner-up

Mixed doubles
Year	Tournament	Partner	Opponent	Score	Result
2010	All England Open	(China) Zhao Yunlei	(Indonesia) Nova Widianto (Indonesia) Liliyana Natsir	21–18, 23–25, 21–18	(gold) Winner
2010	Japan Open	(China) Zhao Yunlei	(China) Tao Jiaming (China) Tian Qing	21–19, 22–20	(gold) Winner
2010	China Open	(China) Zhao Yunlei	(China) Tao Jiaming (China) Tian Qing	18–21, 17–21	(silver) Runner-up
2010	Hong Kong Open	(China) Zhao Yunlei	(Denmark) Joachim Fischer Nielsen (Denmark) Christinna Pedersen	20–22, 21–14, 20–22	(silver) Runner-up
2010	World Superseries Finals	(China) Zhao Yunlei	(Thailand) Sudket Prapakamol (Thailand) Saralee Thungthongkam	21–17, 21–12	(gold) Winner
2011	Korea Open	(China) Zhao Yunlei	(China) Tao Jiaming (China) Tian Qing	21–17, 13–21, 21–19	(gold) Winner
2011	Indonesia Open	(China) Zhao Yunlei	(Indonesia) Tontowi Ahmad (Indonesia) Liliyana Natsir	20–22, 21–14, 21–9	(gold) Winner
2011	Hong Kong Open	(China) Zhao Yunlei	(Denmark) Joachim Fischer Nielsen (Denmark) Christinna Pedersen	15–21, 21–17, 21–17	(gold) Winner
2011	China Open	(China) Zhao Yunlei	(Denmark) Joachim Fischer Nielsen (Denmark) Christinna Pedersen	21–11, 21–14	(gold) Winner
2011	World Superseries Finals	(China) Zhao Yunlei	(China) Xu Chen (China) Ma Jin	21–13, 21–15	(gold) Winner
2012	Malaysia Open	(China) Zhao Yunlei	(China) Xu Chen (China) Ma Jin	21–12, 21–9	(gold) Winner
2012	Hong Kong Open	(China) Zhao Yunlei	(China) Xu Chen (China) Ma Jin	21–17, 21–17	(gold) Winner
2012	World Superseries Finals	(China) Zhao Yunlei	(Denmark) Joachim Fischer Nielsen (Denmark) Christinna Pedersen	21–17, 12–21, 14–21	(silver) Runner-up
2013	Korea Open	(China) Zhao Yunlei	(China) Xu Chen (China) Ma Jin	13–21, 21–16, 21–13	(gold) Winner
2013	All England Open	(China) Zhao Yunlei	(Indonesia) Tontowi Ahmad (Indonesia) Liliyana Natsir	13–21, 17–21	(silver) Runner-up
2013	Indonesia Open	(China) Zhao Yunlei	(Denmark) Joachim Fischer Nielsen (Denmark) Christinna Pedersen	24–22, 20–22, 21–12	(gold) Winner
2013	China Masters	(China) Zhao Yunlei	(South Korea) Yoo Yeon-seong (South Korea) Eom Hye-won	21–18, 21–12	(gold) Winner
2013	Japan Open	(China) Zhao Yunlei	(China) Xu Chen (China) Ma Jin	Walkover	(gold) Winner
2013	Denmark Open	(China) Zhao Yunlei	(Indonesia) Tontowi Ahmad (Indonesia) Liliyana Natsir	21–11, 22–20	(gold) Winner
2013	French Open	(China) Zhao Yunlei	(China) Xu Chen (China) Ma Jin	28–26, 21–18	(gold) Winner
2013	World Superseries Finals	(China) Zhao Yunlei	(Denmark) Joachim Fischer Nielsen (Denmark) Christinna Pedersen	21–12, 19–21, 10–21	(silver) Runner-up
2014	Korea Open	(China) Zhao Yunlei	(China) Xu Chen (China) Ma Jin	21–18, 21–18	(gold) Winner
2014	All England Open	(China) Zhao Yunlei	(Indonesia) Tontowi Ahmad (Indonesia) Liliyana Natsir	13–21, 17–21	(silver) Runner-up
2014	Japan Open	(China) Zhao Yunlei	(Germany) Michael Fuchs (Germany) Birgit Michels	21–12, 21–16	(gold) Winner
2014	China Open	(China) Zhao Yunlei	(South Korea) Yoo Yeon-seong (South Korea) Eom Hye-won	23–25, 21–14, 21–18	(gold) Winner
2014	Hong Kong Open	(China) Zhao Yunlei	(China) Xu Chen (China) Ma Jin	21–14, 21–19	(gold) Winner
2014	Dubai World Superseries Finals	(China) Zhao Yunlei	(China) Liu Cheng (China) Bao Yixin	21–15, 21–12	(gold) Winner
2015	All England Open	(China) Zhao Yunlei	(Indonesia) Tontowi Ahmad (Indonesia) Liliyana Natsir	21–10, 21–10	(gold) Winner
2015	Malaysia Open	(China) Zhao Yunlei	(China) Xu Chen (China) Ma Jin	21–16, 21–14	(gold) Winner
2015	Singapore Open	(China) Zhao Yunlei	(China) Lu Kai (China) Huang Yaqiong	Walkover	(gold) Winner
2015	Indonesia Open	(China) Zhao Yunlei	(China) Xu Chen (China) Ma Jin	17–21, 16–21	(silver) Runner-up
2015	Japan Open	(China) Zhao Yunlei	(Denmark) Joachim Fischer Nielsen (Denmark) Christinna Pedersen	21–17, 18–21, 21–23	(silver) Runner-up
2015	Korea Open	(China) Zhao Yunlei	(Indonesia) Tontowi Ahmad (Indonesia) Liliyana Natsir	21–16, 21–15	(gold) Winner
2015	China Open	(China) Zhao Yunlei	(Denmark) Joachim Fischer Nielsen (Denmark) Christinna Pedersen	21–19, 17–21, 21–19	(gold) Winner
2015	Hong Kong Open	(China) Zhao Yunlei	(China) Liu Cheng (China) Bao Yixin	21–17, 17–21, 21–17	(gold) Winner
2016	China Open	(China) Li Yinhui	(Indonesia) Tontowi Ahmad (Indonesia) Liliyana Natsir	13–21, 22–20, 16–21	(silver) Runner-up

BWF Super Series Finals tournament
BWF Super Series Premier tournament
BWF Super Series tournament

=== BWF Grand Prix (7 titles, 4 runners-up) ===
The BWF Grand Prix had two levels, the Grand Prix and Grand Prix Gold. It was a series of badminton tournaments sanctioned by the Badminton World Federation (BWF) and played between 2007 and 2017.

Men's doubles
Year	Tournament	Partner	Opponent	Score	Result
2010	German Open	(China) Chai Biao	(Chinese Taipei) Chen Hung-ling (Chinese Taipei) Lin Yu-lang	17–21, 21–13, 21–15	(gold) Winner
2014	Swiss Open	(China) Fu Haifeng	(China) Chai Biao (China) Hong Wei	20–22, 14–21	(silver) Runner-up
2015	Chinese Taipei Open	(China) Fu Haifeng	(Indonesia) Marcus Fernaldi Gideon (Indonesia) Kevin Sanjaya Sukamuljo	21–13, 21–8	(gold) Winner
2016	Macau Open	(China) Lu Kai	(Chinese Taipei) Lee Jhe-huei (Chinese Taipei) Lee Yang	21–17, 18–21, 19–21	(silver) Runner-up
2017	Swiss Open	(China) Liu Cheng	(China) Chai Biao (China) Hong Wei	21–13, 16–21, 15–21	(silver) Runner-up

Mixed doubles
Year	Tournament	Partner	Opponent	Score	Result
2009	Philippines Open	(China) Lu Lu	(China) Chen Zhiben (China) Zhang Jinkang	22–20, 21–19	(gold) Winner
2010	Bitburger Open	(China) Zhao Yunlei	(Germany) Michael Fuchs (Germany) Birgit Overzier	22–20, 21–9	(gold) Winner
2013	Swiss Open	(China) Tang Jinhua	(Denmark) Joachim Fischer Nielsen (Denmark) Christinna Pedersen	20–22, 19–21	(silver) Runner-up
2016	Macau Open	(China) Li Yinhui	(Hong Kong) Tang Chun Man (Hong Kong) Tse Ying Suet	21–19, 21–15	(gold) Winner
2017	Thailand Masters	(China) Li Yinhui	(Thailand) Dechapol Puavaranukroh (Thailand) Sapsiree Taerattanachai	21–11, 20–22, 21–13	(gold) Winner
2017	German Open	(China) Li Yinhui	(China) Lu Kai (China) Huang Yaqiong	22–20, 21–11	(gold) Winner

BWF Grand Prix Gold tournament
BWF Grand Prix tournament

=== BWF International Challenge/Series (1 title) ===
Men's doubles
Year	Tournament	Partner	Opponent	Score	Result
2019	Belarus International	(China) Ou Xuanyi	(England) Matthew Clare (England) Max Flynn	21–15, 21–15	(gold) Winner

BWF International Challenge tournament
BWF International Series tournament
BWF Future Series tournament

== Personal life ==
He started a relationship with his mixed doubles partner Zhao Yunlei in 2010. However, before 2016 Summer Olympics, Zhao Yunlei announced that she and Zhang Nan were no longer together. He later married another Chinese badminton player Tian Qing in November 2018.
