= 2015 BWF World Championships – Mixed doubles =

Mixed Doubles at the 2015 BWF World Championships
- Venue: Istora Senayan
- Location: Jakarta, Indonesia
- Dates: August 10, 2015 – August 16, 2015

Medalists
gold medal	Zhang Nan; Zhao Yunlei	China
silver medal	Liu Cheng; Bao Yixin	China
bronze medal	Tontowi Ahmad; Liliyana Natsir	Indonesia
bronze medal	Xu Chen; Ma Jin	China

The mixed doubles tournament of the 2015 BWF World Championships (World Badminton Championships) took place from August 10 to 16. Zhang Nan and Zhao Yunlei enter the competition as the current champions.

== Seeds ==
1. (China) Zhang Nan / Zhao Yunlei (Champion)
2. (China) Xu Chen / Ma Jin (Semifinals)
3. (Indonesia) Tontowi Ahmad / Liliyana Natsir (Semifinals)
4. (China) Liu Cheng / Bao Yixin (Final)
5. (Denmark) Joachim Fischer Nielsen / Christinna Pedersen (3rd round)
6. (China) Lu Kai / Huang Yaqiong (3rd round)
7. (England) Chris Adcock / Gabby Adcock (Quarterfinals)
8. (South Korea) Ko Sung-hyun / Kim Ha-na (Quarterfinals)

9. (Hong Kong) Lee Chun Hei / Chau Hoi Wah (2nd round)
10. (Indonesia) Riky Widianto / Richi Puspita Dili (3rd round)
11. (Indonesia) Praveen Jordan / Debby Susanto (Quarterfinals)
12. (Indonesia) Edi Subaktiar / Gloria Emanuelle Widjaja (3rd round)
13. (Denmark) Mads Pieler Kolding / Kamilla Rytter Juhl (3rd round)
14. (Germany) Michael Fuchs / Birgit Michels (3rd round)
15. (Netherlands) Jacco Arends / Selena Piek (Quarterfinals)
16. (Hong Kong) Chan Yun Lung / Tse Ying Suet (2nd round)

Click on the seed number of a player to go to their draw section.

== Draw ==
=== Finals ===
Quarterfinals
1	(China) Zhang Nan (China) Zhao Yunlei	21	21
11	(Indonesia) Praveen Jordan (Indonesia) Debby Susanto	13	14
3	(Indonesia) Tontowi Ahmad (Indonesia) Liliyana Natsir	21	21
8	(South Korea) Ko Sung-hyun (South Korea) Kim Ha-na	8	15
7	(England) Chris Adcock (England) Gabby Adcock	w	/	o
4	(China) Liu Cheng (China) Bao Yixin
15	(Netherlands) Jacco Arends (Netherlands) Selena Piek	9	18
2	(China) Xu Chen (China) Ma Jin	21	21

Semifinals
1	(China) Zhang Nan (China) Zhao Yunlei	20	23	21
3	(Indonesia) Tontowi Ahmad (Indonesia) Liliyana Natsir	22	21	12
4	(China) Liu Cheng (China) Bao Yixin	21	15	21
2	(China) Xu Chen (China) Ma Jin	13	21	19

Final
1	(China) Zhang Nan (China) Zhao Yunlei	21	21
4	(China) Liu Cheng (China) Bao Yixin	17	11

=== Section 1 ===
First Round
(India) Arun Vishnu (India) Aparna Balan	18	21	22
(Russia) Evgenij Dremin (Russia) Evgenia Dimova	21	10	24
(Canada) Nyl Yakura (Canada) Brittney Tam	12	9
(Singapore) Danny Bawa Chrisnanta (Singapore) Vanessa Neo	21	21
(Canada) Kevin Li (Canada) Rachel Honderich	9	17
(Australia) Robin Middleton (Australia) Leanne Choo	21	21

Second Round
1	(China) Zhang Nan (China) Zhao Yunlei	21	21
(Canada) Phillipe Charron (Canada) Phyllis Chan	10	13
14	(Germany) Michael Fuchs (Germany) Birgit Michels	21	21
(Russia) Evgenij Dremin (Russia) Evgenia Dimova	15	18
5	(Denmark) Joachim Fischer Nielsen (Denmark) Christinna Pedersen	21	21
(Singapore) Danny Bawa Chrisnanta (Singapore) Vanessa Neo	19	12
11	(Indonesia) Praveen Jordan (Indonesia) Debby Susanto	21	21
(Australia) Robin Middleton (Australia) Leanne Choo	9	12

Third Round
1	(China) Zhang Nan (China) Zhao Yunlei	21	21
14	(Germany) Michael Fuchs (Germany) Birgit Michels	14	15
5	(Denmark) Joachim Fischer Nielsen (Denmark) Christinna Pedersen	20	21	21
11	(Indonesia) Praveen Jordan (Indonesia) Debby Susanto	22	19	23

Quarterfinals
1	(China) Zhang Nan (China) Zhao Yunlei	21	21
11	(Indonesia) Praveen Jordan (Indonesia) Debby Susanto	13	14

=== Section 2 ===
First Round
(Peru) Mario Cuba (Peru) Katherine Winder	11	21	10
(Russia) Rodion Kargaev (Russia) Ekaterina Bolotova	21	19	21
(United States) Howard Shu (United States) Eva Lee	19	18
(Malaysia) Chan Peng Soon (Malaysia) Goh Liu Ying	21	21
(Republic of Ireland) Sam Magee (Republic of Ireland) Chloe Magee	21	21
(Chinese Taipei) Wang Chi-lin (Chinese Taipei) Cheng Chi-ya	18	17
(France) Gaëtan Mittelheisser (France) Audrey Fontaine	19	18
(Netherlands) Jorrit de Ruiter (Netherlands) Samantha Barning	21	21

Second Round
3	(Indonesia) Tontowi Ahmad (Indonesia) Liliyana Natsir	21	21
(Russia) Rodion Kargaev (Russia) Ekaterina Bolotova	11	11
9	(Hong Kong) Lee Chun Hei (Hong Kong) Chau Hoi Wah	21	17	18
(Malaysia) Chan Peng Soon (Malaysia) Goh Liu Ying	17	21	21
8	(South Korea) Ko Sung-hyun (South Korea) Kim Ha-na	21	21
(Republic of Ireland) Sam Magee (Republic of Ireland) Chloe Magee	15	9
12	(Indonesia) Edi Subaktiar (Indonesia) Gloria Emanuelle Widjaja	21	21
(Netherlands) Jorrit de Ruiter (Netherlands) Samantha Barning	13	15

Third Round
3	(Indonesia) Tontowi Ahmad (Indonesia) Liliyana Natsir	21	21
(Malaysia) Chan Peng Soon (Malaysia) Goh Liu Ying	8	13
8	(South Korea) Ko Sung-hyun (South Korea) Kim Ha-na	21	21
12	(Indonesia) Edi Subaktiar (Indonesia) Gloria Emanuelle Widjaja	15	18

Quarterfinals
3	(Indonesia) Tontowi Ahmad (Indonesia) Liliyana Natsir	21	21
8	(South Korea) Ko Sung-hyun (South Korea) Kim Ha-na	8	15

=== Section 3 ===
First Round
(Canada) Toby Ng (Canada) Alex Bruce	22	24
(United States) Phillip Chew (United States) Jamie Subandhi	20	22
(South Africa) Andries Malan (South Africa) Jennifer Fry	10	9
(South Korea) Shin Baek-cheol (South Korea) Chang Ye-na	21	21
(Czech Republic) Jakub Bitman (Czech Republic) Alžběta Bášová	w	/	o
(Malaysia) Wong Fai Yin (Malaysia) Chow Mei Kuan
(Japan) Kenichi Hayakawa (Japan) Misaki Matsutomo	21	21
(Sweden) Jonathan Nordh (Sweden) Emelie Fabbeke	17	16

Second Round
(Canada) Toby Ng (Canada) Alex Bruce	12	19
13	(Denmark) Mads Pieler Kolding (Denmark) Kamilla Rytter Juhl	21	21
(South Korea) Shin Baek-cheol (South Korea) Chang Ye-na	17	18
7	(England) Chris Adcock (England) Gabby Adcock	21	21
(Malaysia) Wong Fai Yin (Malaysia) Chow Mei Kuan	21	18	20
10	(Indonesia) Riky Widianto (Indonesia) Richi Puspita Dili	18	21	22
(Japan) Kenichi Hayakawa (Japan) Misaki Matsutomo	19	20
4	(China) Liu Cheng (China) Bao Yixin	21	22

Third Round
13	(Denmark) Mads Pieler Kolding (Denmark) Kamilla Rytter Juhl	16	21	10
7	(England) Chris Adcock (England) Gabby Adcock	21	16	21
10	(Indonesia) Riky Widianto (Indonesia) Richi Puspita Dili	23	20	11
4	(China) Liu Cheng (China) Bao Yixin	21	22	21

Quarterfinals
7	(England) Chris Adcock (England) Gabby Adcock	w	/	o
4	(China) Liu Cheng (China) Bao Yixin

=== Section 4 ===
First Round
(Malaysia) Tan Chee Tean (Malaysia) Lai Shevon Jemie	18	20
(France) Ronan Labar (France) Émilie Lefel	21	22
(Malaysia) Tan Aik Quan (Malaysia) Lai Pei Jing	15	21	2
(Russia) Vitalij Durkin (Russia) Nina Vislova	21	15	3^{r}
(Chinese Taipei) Liao Min-chun (Chinese Taipei) Chen Hsiao-huan	21	21
(India) Tarun Kona (India) N. Sikki Reddy	13	17

Second Round
(France) Ronan Labar (France) Émilie Lefel	21	14	19
15	(Netherlands) Jacco Arends (Netherlands) Selena Piek	17	21	21
(Malaysia) Tan Aik Quan (Malaysia) Lai Pei Jing	14	7
6	(China) Lu Kai (China) Huang Yaqiong	21	21
(Chinese Taipei) Liao Min-chun (Chinese Taipei) Chen Hsiao-huan	13	21	21
16	(Hong Kong) Chan Yun Lung (Hong Kong) Tse Ying Suet	21	17	18
(Russia) Anatoliy Yartsev (Russia) Evgeniya Kosetskaya	w	/	o
2	(China) Xu Chen (China) Ma Jin

Third Round
15	(Netherlands) Jacco Arends (Netherlands) Selena Piek	18	26	23
6	(China) Lu Kai (China) Huang Yaqiong	21	24	21
(Chinese Taipei) Liao Min-chun (Chinese Taipei) Chen Hsiao-huan	22	19
2	(China) Xu Chen (China) Ma Jin	24	21

Quarterfinals
15	(Netherlands) Jacco Arends (Netherlands) Selena Piek	9	18
2	(China) Xu Chen (China) Ma Jin	21	21
