= Zhao Yunlei =

Chinese badminton player (born 1986)

Zhao Yunlei 赵芸蕾
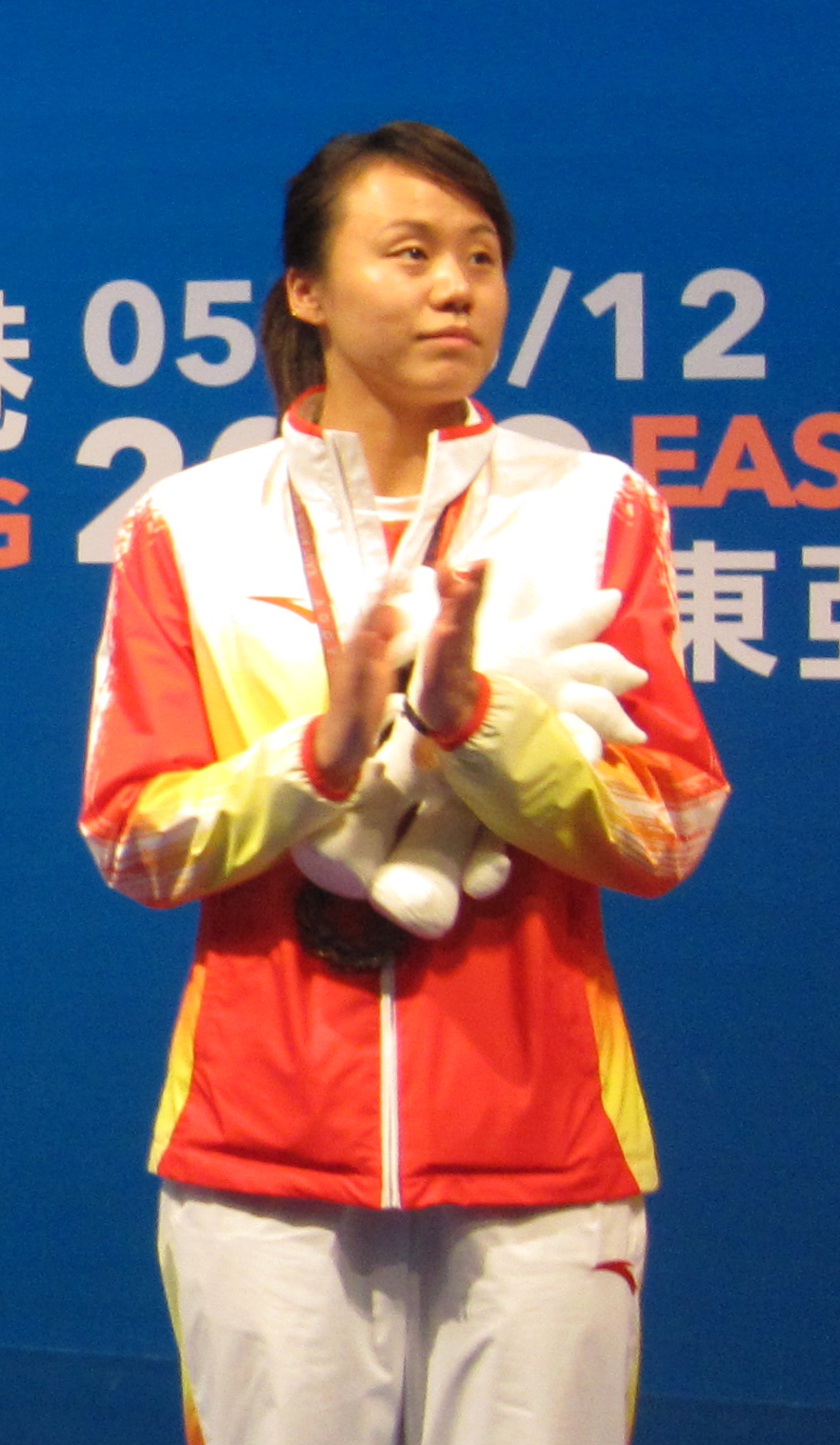
- Zhao Yunlei at the 2009 East Asian Games.

Personal information
- Born: 25 August 1986 (age 40) Yichang, China
- Height: 1.72 m (5 ft 8 in)
- Weight: 61 kg (134 lb)
- Spouse: Hong Wei (m. 2018)

Sport
- Country: China
- Sport: Badminton
- Handedness: Right
- Coached by: Chen Qiqiu

Women's & mixed doubles
- Highest ranking: 1 (WD with Cheng Shu, 5 November 2009); 1 (WD with Tian Qing, 20 September 2012); 1 (XD with Zhang Nan, 27 January 2011)
- BWF profile
Medal record
Women's badminton
Representing China
Olympic Games
| Gold medal – first place | 2012 London | Mixed doubles |
| Gold medal – first place | 2012 London | Women's doubles |
| Bronze medal – third place | 2016 Rio de Janeiro | Mixed doubles |
World Championships
| Gold medal – first place | 2011 London | Mixed doubles |
| Gold medal – first place | 2014 Copenhagen | Women's doubles |
| Gold medal – first place | 2014 Copenhagen | Mixed doubles |
| Gold medal – first place | 2015 Jakarta | Women's doubles |
| Gold medal – first place | 2015 Jakarta | Mixed doubles |
| Silver medal – second place | 2009 Hyderabad | Women's doubles |
| Silver medal – second place | 2011 London | Women's doubles |
| Bronze medal – third place | 2010 Paris | Women's doubles |
| Bronze medal – third place | 2013 Guangzhou | Women's doubles |
| Bronze medal – third place | 2013 Guangzhou | Mixed doubles |
Sudirman Cup
| Gold medal – first place | 2011 Qingdao | Mixed team |
| Gold medal – first place | 2013 Kuala Lumpur | Mixed team |
| Gold medal – first place | 2015 Donggguan | Mixed team |
Uber Cup
| Gold medal – first place | 2012 Wuhan | Women's team |
| Gold medal – first place | 2014 New Delhi | Women's team |
| Gold medal – first place | 2016 Kunshan | Women's team |
Asian Games
| Gold medal – first place | 2010 Guangzhou | Women's doubles |
| Gold medal – first place | 2010 Guangzhou | Women's team |
| Gold medal – first place | 2014 Incheon | Mixed doubles |
| Gold medal – first place | 2014 Incheon | Women's team |
| Silver medal – second place | 2010 Guangzhou | Mixed doubles |
| Bronze medal – third place | 2014 Incheon | Women's doubles |
Asian Championships
| Gold medal – first place | 2011 Chengdu | Mixed doubles |
| Gold medal – first place | 2012 Qingdao | Mixed doubles |
| Gold medal – first place | 2012 Qingdao | Women's doubles |
| Gold medal – first place | 2016 Wuhan | Mixed doubles |
| Silver medal – second place | 2007 Johor Bahru | Women's doubles |
| Silver medal – second place | 2011 Chengdu | Women's doubles |
| Silver medal – second place | 2013 Taipei | Mixed doubles |
Asia Team Championships
| Gold medal – first place | 2016 Hyderabad | Women's Team |
East Asian Games
| Gold medal – first place | 2009 Hong Kong | Women's team |
| Gold medal – first place | 2013 Tianjin | Women's team |
| Bronze medal – third place | 2009 Hong Kong | Women's doubles |
Asian Junior Championships
| Gold medal – first place | 2004 Hwacheon | Girls' doubles |
| Gold medal – first place | 2004 Hwacheon | Girls' team |

Zhao Yunlei
- Traditional Chinese: 趙芸蕾
- Simplified Chinese: 赵芸蕾
Transcriptions
Standard Mandarin
- Hanyu Pinyin: Zhào Yúnlěi

Zhao Yunlei (born 25 August 1986) is a mixed and women's doubles badminton player from China. She graduated with a BA from Huazhong University of Science and Technology. She is the first and only badminton player to have ever won two gold medals in the same Olympic edition, winning in both the mixed and women's doubles categories in 2012. Zhao joins the ranks with nine other players with two Olympic gold medals, the highest number of gold medals won by any badminton player. Through her performance at the 2014 and 2015 BWF World Championships, she became the first player to win two gold medals in two consecutive BWF World Championships.

As of the 2015 BWF World Championships, she has become the most successful player in the World Championship medal count, with a total of ten medals, overtaking Gao Ling, who has a total of nine. In addition, by winning the 2015 BWF World Championships mixed doubles title, she and partner Zhang Nan have won three World Championship mixed doubles titles, the first pairing ever to have done so. Zhao had won numerous prestigious titles both in the mixed and women's doubles including the Olympics, World Championships, Asian Games, Asian Championships, and All England Open Championships, as well as the World Mixed Team Championships (Sudirman Cup), World Women's Team Championships (Uber Cup), Asian Games Women's Team gold medal, and Asia Women's Team Championships.

She is regarded by many as one of the best female doubles players in the history of badminton alongside past greats, such as former teammate Gao Ling. Zhao has achieved massive overall success in both the mixed and women's doubles, having won a total of 63 individual career titles (38 in mixed, 25 in women's doubles). Among these 63 individual titles, 42 of them are Superseries titles (27 in mixed, 15 in women's doubles), making her the third most successful player in terms of overall Superseries achievements, and the most-successful female player in this regard as well. After the 2016 Olympics, Zhao retired from international badminton competition.

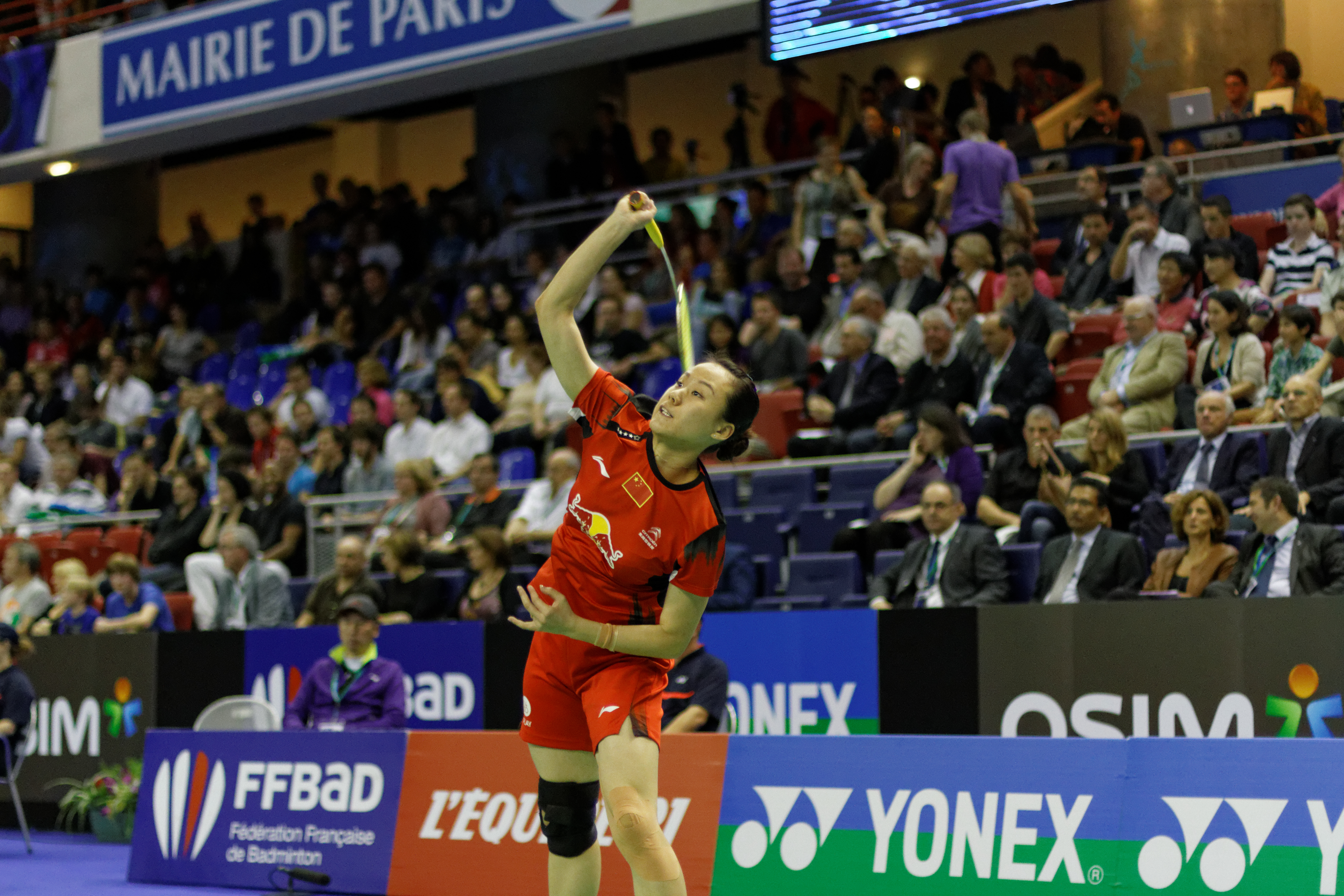
Zhao Yunlei in 2013

== Career ==
Zhao played with Tian Qing in the women's doubles and with Zhang Nan in the mixed doubles. She first achieved the world number 1 in the BWF World ranking with partner Cheng Shu in November 2009. She then partnered with Zhang Nan in the mixed and occupied the world number 1 in January 2011. After separated with Cheng, Zhao competed in the women's doubles event with Tian Qing, and again topped the world ranking in September 2012.

=== 2010 ===
Zhao and Zhang won the 2010 All England Open mixed doubles title, being the first players and pairing to have ever won the title through beginning at the qualifying stage. Zhao and Tian won the 2010 Asian Games gold medal after vanquishing compatriots Wang Xiaoli and Yu Yang 20–22, 21–15, and 21–12. Zhao also participated in China's women's team which gain a gold medal too.

=== 2011 ===
In January, Zhao and Zhang won the World Superseries Finals (having held during January 2011) in Taipei. They defeating Sudket Prapakamol and Saralee Thungthongkam of Thailand 21–17, 21–12 in the final. Zhao also reached the final in the women's doubles with Cheng. Two weeks later, they triumphed at Seoul by winning the Korea Open. In the final, they conquered compatriots Tao Jiaming and Tian Qing. Zhao and Tian reached the women's doubles final as well. In August, at the 2011 BWF World Championships in London, Zhao and Zhang won the mixed doubles title, with this being Zhao's first ever overall World Championship gold medal and first ever mixed doubles World Championship gold medal. She also won a silver medal in the women's doubles with Tian as well. In October, Zhao and Zhang reached the Denmark Open mixed doubles semi-final but they lost to Denmark's Joachim Fischer Nielsen and Christinna Pedersen 12–21, 21–14, and 20–22. However, Zhao and Zhao managed to reverse this, by winning against Fischer Nielsen and Pedersen in the mixed doubles finals at both the Hong Kong and China Open's. In December, Zhao and Zhang won the World Superseries Finals, successfully defending the title first won in January of the 2011 year.

=== 2012 ===
In July–August at the London Olympics, she won two gold medals in the mixed doubles with Zhang Nan and women's doubles with Tian Qing.

=== 2013 ===
In August, at the 2013 BWF World Championships in Guangzhou, she won bronze in both the mixed doubles with Zhang and the women's doubles with Tian.

=== 2014 ===
In August, at the 2014 BWF World Championships in Copenhagen, she won both the mixed doubles with Zhang and the women's doubles with Tian, with this being Zhao's first World Championship women's doubles gold medal. In September, Zhao and Zhang won the 2014 Asian Games mixed doubles title, avenging the loss from four years ago. In December, Zhao and Zhang won the Dubai World Superseries Finals. Zhao was also awarded as the 2014 BWF Female Player of the Year.

=== 2015 ===
In August, at the 2015 BWF World Championships in Jakarta, she successfully defended her titles in both the mixed and women's doubles with partner Zhao and Tian respectively.

=== 2016 ===
In April–May, Zhao and Zhang won the Asian Championships. In August, she and Zhang won a bronze medal in the mixed doubles at the 2016 Rio Olympics. This is her third Olympic medal in addition to the two golds won four years ago.

=== 2018 ===
One and a half years after her retirement from the international tournaments, Zhao returning to the national team as an assistant coach.

== Achievements ==
=== Olympic Games ===
Women's doubles
| Year | Venue | Partner | Opponent | Score | Result |
|---|---|---|---|---|---|
| 2012 | Wembley Arena, London, Great Britain | (China) Tian Qing | (Japan) Mizuki Fujii (Japan) Reika Kakiiwa | 21–10, 25–23 | Gold |

Mixed doubles
| Year | Venue | Partner | Opponent | Score | Result |
|---|---|---|---|---|---|
| 2012 | Wembley Arena, London, Great Britain | (China) Zhang Nan | (China) Xu Chen (China) Ma Jin | 21–11, 21–17 | Gold |
| 2016 | Riocentro – Pavilion 4, Rio de Janeiro, Brazil | (China) Zhang Nan | (China) Xu Chen (China) Ma Jin | 21–7, 21–11 | Bronze |

=== BWF World Championships ===
Women's doubles
| Year | Venue | Partner | Opponent | Score | Result |
|---|---|---|---|---|---|
| 2009 | Gachibowli Indoor Stadium, Hyderabad, India | (China) Cheng Shu | (China) Zhang Yawen (China) Zhao Tingting | 21–17, 17–21, 16–21 | Silver |
| 2010 | Stade Pierre de Coubertin, Paris, France | (China) Cheng Shu | (China) Ma Jin (China) Wang Xiaoli | 21–10, 10–21, 13–21 | Bronze |
| 2011 | Wembley Arena, London, England | (China) Tian Qing | (China) Wang Xiaoli (China) Yu Yang | 20–22, 11–21 | Silver |
| 2013 | Tianhe Sports Center, Guangzhou, China | (China) Tian Qing | (South Korea) Chang Ye-na (South Korea) Eom Hye-won | 16–21, 19–21 | Bronze |
| 2014 | Ballerup Super Arena, Copenhagen, Denmark | (China) Tian Qing | (China) Wang Xiaoli (China) Yu Yang | 21–19, 21–15 | Gold |
| 2015 | Istora Senayan, Jakarta, Indonesia | (China) Tian Qing | (Denmark) Christinna Pedersen (Denmark) Kamilla Rytter Juhl | 23–25, 21–8, 21–15 | Gold |

Mixed doubles
| Year | Venue | Partner | Opponent | Score | Result |
|---|---|---|---|---|---|
| 2011 | Wembley Arena, London, England | (China) Zhang Nan | (England) Chris Adcock (Scotland) Imogen Bankier | 21–15, 21–7 | Gold |
| 2013 | Tianhe Sports Center, Guangzhou, China | (China) Zhang Nan | (Indonesia) Tontowi Ahmad (Indonesia) Liliyana Natsir | 21–15, 18–21, 13–21 | Bronze |
| 2014 | Ballerup Super Arena, Copenhagen, Denmark | (China) Zhang Nan | (China) Xu Chen (China) Ma Jin | 21–12, 21–23, 21–13 | Gold |
| 2015 | Istora Senayan, Jakarta, Indonesia | (China) Zhang Nan | (China) Liu Cheng (China) Bao Yixin | 21–17, 21–11 | Gold |

=== Asian Games ===
Women's doubles
| Year | Venue | Partner | Opponent | Score | Result |
|---|---|---|---|---|---|
| 2010 | Tianhe Gymnasium, Guangzhou, China | (China) Tian Qing | (China) Wang Xiaoli (China) Yu Yang | 20–22, 21–15, 21–12 | Gold |
| 2014 | Gyeyang Gymnasium, Incheon, South Korea | (China) Tian Qing | (Indonesia) Nitya Krishinda Maheswari (Indonesia) Greysia Polii | 17–21, 21–19, 17–21 | Bronze |

Mixed doubles
| Year | Venue | Partner | Opponent | Score | Result |
|---|---|---|---|---|---|
| 2010 | Tianhe Gymnasium, Guangzhou, China | (China) Zhang Nan | (South Korea) Shin Baek-cheol (South Korea) Lee Hyo-jung | 19–21, 14–21 | Silver |
| 2014 | Gyeyang Gymnasium, Incheon, South Korea | (China) Zhang Nan | (Indonesia) Tontowi Ahmad (Indonesia) Liliyana Natsir | 21–16, 21–14 | Gold |

=== Asian Championships ===
Women's doubles
| Year | Venue | Partner | Opponent | Score | Result |
|---|---|---|---|---|---|
| 2007 | Bandaraya Stadium, Johor Bahru, Malaysia | (China) Cheng Shu | (China) Yang Wei (China) Zhao Tingting | 10–21, 11–21 | Silver |
| 2011 | Sichuan Gymnasium, Chengdu, China | (China) Tian Qing | (China) Wang Xiaoli (China) Yu Yang | 13–21, 10–21 | Silver |
| 2012 | Qingdao Sports Centre Conson Stadium, Qingdao, China | (China) Tian Qing | (China) Bao Yixin (China) Zhong Qianxin | 21–14, 21–15 | Gold |

Mixed doubles
| Year | Venue | Partner | Opponent | Score | Result |
|---|---|---|---|---|---|
| 2011 | Sichuan Gymnasium, Chengdu, China | (China) Zhang Nan | (China) Xu Chen (China) Ma Jin | 15–21, 21–15, 25–23 | Gold |
| 2012 | Qingdao Sports Centre Conson Stadium, Qingdao, China | (China) Zhang Nan | (China) Xu Chen (China) Ma Jin | 21–13, 21–12 | Gold |
| 2013 | Taipei Arena, Taipei, Chinese Taipei | (China) Zhang Nan | (South Korea) Ko Sung-hyun (South Korea) Kim Ha-na | 20–22, 17–21 | Silver |
| 2016 | Wuhan Sports Center Gymnasium, Wuhan, China | (China) Zhang Nan | (Indonesia) Tontowi Ahmad (Indonesia) Liliyana Natsir | 16–21, 21–9, 21–17 | Gold |

=== East Asian Games ===
Women's doubles
| Year | Venue | Partner | Opponent | Score | Result |
|---|---|---|---|---|---|
| 2009 | Queen Elizabeth Stadium, Hong Kong | (China) Cheng Shu | (Macau) Zhang Dan (Macau) Zhang Zhibo | 13–21, 10–21 | Bronze |

=== Asian Junior Championships ===
Girls' doubles
| Year | Venue | Partner | Opponent | Score | Result |
|---|---|---|---|---|---|
| 2004 | Hwacheon Indoor Stadium, Hwacheon, South Korea | (China) Ding Jiao | (China) Feng Chen (China) Pan Pan | 5–15, 15–8, 15–12 | Gold |

=== BWF Superseries (42 titles, 27 runner-ups) ===
The BWF Superseries, which was launched on 14 December 2006 and implemented in 2007, is a series of elite badminton tournaments, sanctioned by the Badminton World Federation (BWF). BWF Superseries levels are Superseries and Superseries Premier. A season of Superseries consists of twelve tournaments around the world that have been introduced since 2011. Successful players are invited to the Superseries Finals, which are held at the end of each year.

Women's doubles
| Year | Tournament | Partner | Opponent | Score | Result |
|---|---|---|---|---|---|
| 2008 | Japan Open | (China) Cheng Shu | (Malaysia) Chin Eei Hui (Malaysia) Wong Pei Tty | 21–19, 5–21, 21–18 | (gold) Winner |
| 2008 | China Masters | (China) Cheng Shu | (Macau) Zhang Dan (Macau) Zhang Zhibo | 21–14, 21–11 | (gold) Winner |
| 2008 | Hong Kong Open | (China) Cheng Shu | (China) Zhang Yawen (China) Zhao Tingting | 14–21, 13–21 | (silver) Runner-up |
| 2009 | All England Open | (China) Cheng Shu | (China) Zhang Yawen (China) Zhao Tingting | 13–21, 15–21 | (silver) Runner-up |
| 2009 | Indonesia Open | (China) Cheng Shu | (Malaysia) Chin Eei Hui (Malaysia) Wong Pei Tty | 16–21, 16–21 | (silver) Runner-up |
| 2009 | China Masters | (China) Cheng Shu | (China) Du Jing (China) Yu Yang | 15–21, 15–21 | (silver) Runner-up |
| 2009 | French Open | (China) Cheng Shu | (China) Ma Jin (China) Wang Xiaoli | 13–21, 8–21 | (silver) Runner-up |
| 2010 | Korea Open | (China) Cheng Shu | (Japan) Mizuki Fujii (Japan) Reika Kakiiwa | 21–16, 21–15 | (gold) Winner |
| 2010 | All England Open | (China) Cheng Shu | (China) Du Jing (China) Yu Yang | 22–20, 16–21, 13–21 | (silver) Runner-up |
| 2010 | Japan Open | (China) Cheng Shu | (China) Wang Xiaoli (China) Yu Yang | 17–21, 6–21 | (silver) Runner-up |
| 2010 | China Open | (China) Cheng Shu | (China) Ma Jin (China) Zhong Qianxin | Walkover | (gold) Winner |
| 2010 | World Superseries Finals | (China) Cheng Shu | (China) Wang Xiaoli (China) Yu Yang | 7–21, 17–21 | (silver) Runner-up |
| 2011 | Malaysia Open | (China) Tian Qing | (China) Wang Xiaoli (China) Yu Yang | 21–12, 6–21, 21–17 | (gold) Winner |
| 2011 | Korea Open | (China) Tian Qing | (China) Wang Xiaoli (China) Yu Yang | 18–21, 21–19, 4–21 | (silver) Runner-up |
| 2011 | Singapore Open | (China) Tian Qing | (South Korea) Ha Jung-eun (South Korea) Kim Min-jung | 21–13, 21–16 | (gold) Winner |
| 2011 | Denmark Open | (China) Tian Qing | (China) Wang Xiaoli (China) Yu Yang | 20–22, 16–21 | (silver) Runner-up |
| 2011 | French Open | (China) Tian Qing | (China) Wang Xiaoli (China) Yu Yang | 24–26, 15–21 | (silver) Runner-up |
| 2011 | Hong Kong Open | (China) Tian Qing | (China) Wang Xiaoli (China) Yu Yang | 12–21, 2–14 retired | (silver) Runner-up |
| 2012 | Korea Open | (China) Tian Qing | (South Korea) Ha Jung-eun (South Korea) Kim Min-jung | 21–18, 21–13 | (gold) Winner |
| 2012 | All England Open | (China) Tian Qing | (China) Wang Xiaoli (China) Yu Yang | 21–17, 21–12 | (gold) Winner |
| 2012 | Indonesia Open | (China) Tian Qing | (China) Wang Xiaoli (China) Yu Yang | 21–17, 9–21, 16–21 | (silver) Runner-up |
| 2012 | Hong Kong Open | (China) Tian Qing | (China) Wang Xiaoli (China) Yu Yang | 22–20, 14–21, 21–17 | (gold) Winner |
| 2013 | All England Open | (China) Cheng Shu | (China) Wang Xiaoli (China) Yu Yang | 18–21, 10–21 | (silver) Runner-up |
| 2013 | Singapore Open | (China) Tian Qing | (Japan) Misaki Matsutomo (Japan) Ayaka Takahashi | 21–19, 21–16 | (gold) Winner |
| 2013 | French Open | (China) Tian Qing | (China) Bao Yixin (China) Tang Jinhua | 13–21, 17–21 | (silver) Runner-up |
| 2014 | Indonesia Open | (China) Tian Qing | (China) Ma Jin (China) Tang Yuanting | Walkover | (gold) Winner |
| 2014 | Australian Open | (China) Tian Qing | (Japan) Misaki Matsutomo (Japan) Ayaka Takahashi | 21–15, 21–9 | (gold) Winner |
| 2014 | China Open | (China) Tian Qing | (China) Wang Xiaoli (China) Yu Yang | 16–21, 21–19, 20–22 | (silver) Runner-up |
| 2014 | Hong Kong Open | (China) Tian Qing | (Japan) Misaki Matsutomo (Japan) Ayaka Takahashi | 21–13, 21–13 | (gold) Winner |
| 2014 | Dubai World Superseries Finals | (China) Tian Qing | (Japan) Misaki Matsutomo (Japan) Ayaka Takahashi | 17–21, 14–21 | (silver) Runner-up |
| 2015 | Japan Open | (China) Zhong Qianxin | (Denmark) Christinna Pedersen (Denmark) Kamilla Rytter Juhl | 21–12, 21–16 | (gold) Winner |
| 2015 | Denmark Open | (China) Tian Qing | (South Korea) Jung Kyung-eun (South Korea) Shin Seung-chan | Walkover | (silver) Runner-up |
| 2015 | Hong Kong Open | (China) Tian Qing | (China) Tang Yuanting (China) Yu Yang | 21–15, 21–12 | (gold) Winner |

Mixed doubles
| Year | Tournament | Partner | Opponent | Score | Result |
|---|---|---|---|---|---|
| 2008 | China Open | (China) Xu Chen | (South Korea) Lee Yong-dae (South Korea) Lee Hyo-jung | 16–21, 15–21 | (silver) Runner-up |
| 2010 | All England Open | (China) Zhang Nan | (Indonesia) Nova Widianto (Indonesia) Liliyana Natsir | 21–18, 23–25, 21–18 | (gold) Winner |
| 2010 | Japan Open | (China) Zhang Nan | (China) Tao Jiaming (China) Tian Qing | 21–19, 22–20 | (gold) Winner |
| 2010 | China Open | (China) Zhang Nan | (China) Tao Jiaming (China) Tian Qing | 18–21, 17–21 | (silver) Runner-up |
| 2010 | Hong Kong Open | (China) Zhang Nan | (Denmark) Joachim Fischer Nielsen (Denmark) Christinna Pedersen | 20–22, 21–14, 20–22 | (silver) Runner-up |
| 2010 | World Superseries Finals | (China) Zhang Nan | (Thailand) Sudket Prapakamol (Thailand) Saralee Thungthongkam | 21–17, 21–12 | (gold) Winner |
| 2011 | Korea Open | (China) Zhang Nan | (China) Tao Jiaming (China) Tian Qing | 21–17, 13–21, 21–19 | (gold) Winner |
| 2011 | Indonesia Open | (China) Zhang Nan | (Indonesia) Tontowi Ahmad (Indonesia) Liliyana Natsir | 20–22, 21–14, 21–9 | (gold) Winner |
| 2011 | Hong Kong Open | (China) Zhang Nan | (Denmark) Joachim Fischer Nielsen (Denmark) Christinna Pedersen | 15–21, 21–17, 21–17 | (gold) Winner |
| 2011 | China Open | (China) Zhang Nan | (Denmark) Joachim Fischer Nielsen (Denmark) Christinna Pedersen | 21–11, 21–14 | (gold) Winner |
| 2011 | World Superseries Finals | (China) Zhang Nan | (China) Xu Chen (China) Ma Jin | 21–13, 21–15 | (gold) Winner |
| 2012 | Malaysia Open | (China) Zhang Nan | (China) Xu Chen (China) Ma Jin | 21–12, 21–9 | (gold) Winner |
| 2012 | Hong Kong Open | (China) Zhang Nan | (China) Xu Chen (China) Ma Jin | 21–17, 21–17 | (gold) Winner |
| 2012 | World Superseries Finals | (China) Zhang Nan | (Denmark) Joachim Fischer Nielsen (Denmark) Christinna Pedersen | 21–17, 12–21, 14–21 | (silver) Runner-up |
| 2013 | Korea Open | (China) Zhang Nan | (China) Xu Chen (China) Ma Jin | 13–21, 21–16, 21–13 | (gold) Winner |
| 2013 | All England Open | (China) Zhang Nan | (Indonesia) Tontowi Ahmad (Indonesia) Liliyana Natsir | 13–21, 17–21 | (silver) Runner-up |
| 2013 | Indonesia Open | (China) Zhang Nan | (Denmark) Joachim Fischer Nielsen (Denmark) Christinna Pedersen | 24–22, 20–22, 21–12 | (gold) Winner |
| 2013 | China Masters | (China) Zhang Nan | (South Korea) Yoo Yeon-seong (South Korea) Eom Hye-won | 21–18, 21–12 | (gold) Winner |
| 2013 | Japan Open | (China) Zhang Nan | (China) Xu Chen (China) Ma Jin | Walkover | (gold) Winner |
| 2013 | Denmark Open | (China) Zhang Nan | (Indonesia) Tontowi Ahmad (Indonesia) Liliyana Natsir | 21–11, 22–20 | (gold) Winner |
| 2013 | French Open | (China) Zhang Nan | (China) Xu Chen (China) Ma Jin | 28–26, 21–18 | (gold) Winner |
| 2013 | World Superseries Finals | (China) Zhang Nan | (Denmark) Joachim Fischer Nielsen (Denmark) Christinna Pedersen | 21–12, 19–21, 10–21 | (silver) Runner-up |
| 2014 | Korea Open | (China) Zhang Nan | (China) Xu Chen (China) Ma Jin | 21–18, 21–18 | (gold) Winner |
| 2014 | All England Open | (China) Zhang Nan | (Indonesia) Tontowi Ahmad (Indonesia) Liliyana Natsir | 13–21, 17–21 | (silver) Runner-up |
| 2014 | Japan Open | (China) Zhang Nan | (Germany) Michael Fuchs (Germany) Birgit Michels | 21–12, 21–16 | (gold) Winner |
| 2014 | China Open | (China) Zhang Nan | (South Korea) Yoo Yeon-seong (South Korea) Eom Hye-won | 23–25, 21–14, 21–18 | (gold) Winner |
| 2014 | Hong Kong Open | (China) Zhang Nan | (China) Xu Chen (China) Ma Jin | 21–14, 21–19 | (gold) Winner |
| 2014 | Dubai World Superseries Finals | (China) Zhang Nan | (China) Liu Cheng (China) Bao Yixin | 21–15, 21–12 | (gold) Winner |
| 2015 | All England Open | (China) Zhang Nan | (Indonesia) Tontowi Ahmad (Indonesia) Liliyana Natsir | 21–10, 21–10 | (gold) Winner |
| 2015 | Malaysia Open | (China) Zhang Nan | (China) Xu Chen (China) Ma Jin | 21–16, 21–14 | (gold) Winner |
| 2015 | Singapore Open | (China) Zhang Nan | (China) Lu Kai (China) Huang Yaqiong | Walkover | (gold) Winner |
| 2015 | Indonesia Open | (China) Zhang Nan | (China) Xu Chen (China) Ma Jin | 17–21, 16–21 | (silver) Runner-up |
| 2015 | Japan Open | (China) Zhang Nan | (Denmark) Joachim Fischer Nielsen (Denmark) Christinna Pedersen | 21–17, 18–21, 21–23 | (silver) Runner-up |
| 2015 | Korea Open | (China) Zhang Nan | (Indonesia) Tontowi Ahmad (Indonesia) Liliyana Natsir | 21–16, 21–15 | (gold) Winner |
| 2015 | China Open | (China) Zhang Nan | (Denmark) Joachim Fischer Nielsen (Denmark) Christinna Pedersen | 21–19, 17–21, 21–19 | (gold) Winner |
| 2015 | Hong Kong Open | (China) Zhang Nan | (China) Liu Cheng (China) Bao Yixin | 21–17, 17–21, 21–17 | (gold) Winner |

BWF Super Series Finals tournament
BWF Super Series Premier tournament
BWF Super Series tournament

=== BWF Grand Prix (7 titles, 2 runner-ups) ===
The BWF Grand Prix had two levels, the BWF Grand Prix and Grand Prix Gold. It was a series of badminton tournaments sanctioned by the Badminton World Federation (BWF) which was held from 2007 to 2017.

Women's doubles
| Year | Tournament | Partner | Opponent | Score | Result |
|---|---|---|---|---|---|
| 2008 | Macau Open | (China) Cheng Shu | (China) Ma Jin (China) Wang Xiaoli | 21–15, 21–18 | (gold) Winner |
| 2009 | German Open | (China) Cheng Shu | (China) Pan Pan (China) Tian Qing | 18–21, 21–13, 21–16 | (gold) Winner |
| 2010 | German Open | (China) Cheng Shu | (China) Ma Jin (China) Wang Xiaoli | 22–24, 15–21 | (silver) Runner-up |
| 2011 | Thailand Open | (China) Tian Qing | (China) Bao Yixin (China) Cheng Shu | 21–7, 21–8 | (gold) Winner |
| 2016 | Thailand Masters | (China) Tian Qing | (China) Tang Yuanting (China) Yu Yang | 11–21, 21–12, 23–21 | (gold) Winner |

Mixed doubles
| Year | Tournament | Partner | Opponent | Score | Result |
|---|---|---|---|---|---|
| 2008 | Macau Open | (China) Xu Chen | (Hong Kong) Yohan Hadikusumo Wiratama (Hong Kong) Chau Hoi Wah | 21–15, 21–16 | (gold) Winner |
| 2009 | German Open | (China) Xu Chen | (China) Zheng Bo (China) Ma Jin | 21–18, 23–21 | (gold) Winner |
| 2009 | Malaysia Grand Prix Gold | (China) Xu Chen | (China) Zheng Bo (China) Ma Jin | 5–5 retired | (silver) Runner-up |
| 2010 | Bitburger Open | (China) Zhang Nan | (Germany) Michael Fuchs (Germany) Birgit Overzier | 22–20, 21–9 | (gold) Winner |

BWF Grand Prix Gold tournament
BWF Grand Prix tournament

=== BWF International Challenge/Series (1 title) ===
Women's doubles
| Year | Tournament | Partner | Opponent | Score | Result |
|---|---|---|---|---|---|
| 2007 | Austrian International | (China) Cheng Shu | (China) Pan Pan (China) Tian Qing | 21–18, 21–13 | (gold) Winner |

BWF International Challenge tournament
BWF International Series tournament

== Awards and nominations ==
| Award | Year | Category | Result |
|---|---|---|---|
| Badminton World Federation | 2022 | Badminton Hall of Fame | Placed |
