= 2010 Hong Kong Super Series =

Badminton championships

The 2010 Hong Kong Super Series was a top level badminton competition which was held from December 7, 2010 to December 12, 2010 in Hong Kong. It was the 12th BWF Super Series competition on the 2010 BWF Super Series schedule. The total purse for the event was $200,000.

== Men's singles ==
1. (Malaysia) Lee Chong Wei
2. (Denmark) Peter Gade
3. (Indonesia) Taufik Hidayat
4. (China) Lin Dan
5. (China) Chen Jin
6. (Thailand) Boonsak Ponsana
7. (China) Chen Long
8. (Vietnam) Nguyen Tien Minh

=== Top half ===
First Round
1	(Malaysia) Lee Chong Wei	21	21
(Denmark) Christian Lind	12	8
Q4	(China) Wang Zhengming	21	21
(Malaysia) Muhammad Hafiz Hashim	18	12
5	(China) Chen Jin	21	21
(France) Brice Leverdez	10	12
(India) Parupalli Kashyap	21	19	21
(Chinese Taipei) Hsieh Yu-hsing	14	21	18
4	(China) Lin Dan	21	23
(Denmark) Jan Ø. Jørgensen	9	21
(South Korea) Shon Wan-ho	21	21
(Hong Kong) Chan Yan Kit	10	17
8	(Vietnam) Nguyen Tien Minh	21	21
Q3	(Hong Kong) Tam Chun Hei	13	9
(Hong Kong) Hu Yun	21	21
(Indonesia) Dionysius Hayom Rumbaka	9	17

Second Round
1	(Malaysia) Lee Chong Wei	21	21
Q4	(China) Wang Zhengming	17	11
5	(China) Chen Jin	21	21
(India) Parupalli Kashyap	15	18
4	(China) Lin Dan	21	21
(South Korea) Shon Wan-ho	15	16
8	(Vietnam) Nguyen Tien Minh	21	21
(Hong Kong) Hu Yun	18	14

Quarterfinals
1	(Malaysia) Lee Chong Wei	w/o
5	(China) Chen Jin
4	(China) Lin Dan
8	(Vietnam) Nguyen Tien Minh	w/o

Semifinals
1	(Malaysia) Lee Chong Wei	21	21
8	(Vietnam) Nguyen Tien Minh	14	17

=== Bottom half ===
First Round
(South Korea) Park Sung-hwan	21	21
PFQ	(Chinese Taipei) Chou Tien Chen	13	18
Q2	(China) Wen Kai	21	21	19
6	(Thailand) Boonsak Ponsana	17	23	21
(Thailand) Tanongsak Saensomboonsuk	21	23
(India) Arvind Bhat	13	21
(China) Du Pengyu	19	9
3	(Indonesia) Taufik Hidayat	21	21
(Sweden) Henri Hurskainen	20	25	14
(Chinese Taipei) Hsueh Hsuan-Yi	22	23	21
(Germany) Marc Zwiebler	18	13
7	(China) Chen Long	21	21
(Lithuania) Kestutis Navickas	9	16
Q1	(South Korea) Lee Hyun-il	1	21
(Hong Kong) Wong Wing Ki	21	19	21
PFQ	(India) Gurusai Datt	12	21	13

Second Round
(South Korea) Park Sung-hwan	21	21
6	(Thailand) Boonsak Ponsana	12	15
(Thailand) Tanongsak Saensomboonsuk	19	18
3	(Indonesia) Taufik Hidayat	21	21
(Chinese Taipei) Hsueh Hsuan-Yi	18	10
7	(China) Chen Long	21	21
Q1	(South Korea) Lee Hyun-il	21	21
(Hong Kong) Wong Wing Ki	12	13

Quarterfinals
(South Korea) Park Sung-hwan	21	17
3	(Indonesia) Taufik Hidayat	23	21
7	(China) Chen Long	17	21	21
Q1	(South Korea) Lee Hyun-il	21	16	19

Semifinals
3	(Indonesia) Taufik Hidayat	15	21	21
7	(China) Chen Long	21	11	19

=== Final ===
Final
1	(Malaysia) Lee Chong Wei	21	21
3	(Indonesia) Taufik Hidayat	19	9

== Women's singles ==
1. (China) Wang Xin
2. (India) Saina Nehwal
3. (China) Wang Shixian
4. (China) Jiang Yanjiao
5. (France) Pi Hongyan
6. (Germany) Juliane Schenk
7. (South Korea) Bae Youn-joo
8. (Russia) Ella Diehl

=== Top half ===
First Round
1	(China) Wang X	21	19	21
PFQ	(Singapore) Zhang BW	15	21	16
(Chinese Taipei) Tai T-y	21	21
(China) Lu L	16	19
5	(France) Pi HY	21	21
Q1	(Philippines) M Alcala	12	15
(Thailand) P Buranaprasertsuk	21	21
(United States) R Wang	16	15
3	(China) Wang SX	21	21
(Netherlands) Yao J	18	18
(Canada) M Li	18	10
(Chinese Taipei) Cheng S-c	21	21
8	(Russia) E Diehl	23	9	17
(Thailand) R Inthanon	21	21	21
PFQ	(Indonesia) L Fanetri	21	21
(Slovenia) M Tvrdy	15	16

Second Round
1	(China) Wang X	21	21
(Chinese Taipei) Tai T-y	18	10
5	(France) Pi HY	14	21	21
(Thailand) P Buranaprasertsuk	21	11	15
3	(China) Wang SX	21	21
(Chinese Taipei) Cheng S-c	12	12
(Thailand) R Inthanon	19	21	21
PFQ	(Indonesia) L Fanetri	21	7	9

Quarterfinals
1	(China) Wang X	21	21
5	(France) Pi HY	13	15
3	(China) Wang SX	21	21
(Thailand) R Inthanon	11	15

Semifinals
1	(China) Wang X	13	14
3	(China) Wang SX	21	21

=== Bottom half ===
First Round
Q3	(South Korea) Hwang H-y	21	17
Q2	(Indonesia) A Yuswandari	23	21
(Singapore) Chen JY	14	8
6	(Germany) J Schenk	21	21
(South Korea) Sung J-h	21	21
(Bulgaria) P Nedelcheva	11	16
Q4	(Canada) J Ko	6	15
4	(China) Jiang YJ	21	21
(South Korea) Bae S-h	16	20
(Hong Kong) Yip P Y	21	22
PFQ	(Chinese Taipei) Hung S-h	16	9
7	(South Korea) Bae Y-j	21	21
(Thailand) S Ponsana	21	21
(Chinese Taipei) Chen H-h	18	13
(Hong Kong) Chan T K	16	18
2	(India) S Nehwal	21	21

Second Round
Q2	(Indonesia) A Yuswandari	21	14	19
6	(Germany) J Schenk	13	21	21
(South Korea) Sung J-h	12	17
4	(China) Jiang YJ	21	21
(Hong Kong) Yip P Y	21	21
7	(South Korea) Bae Y-j	17	10
(Thailand) S Ponsana	10	12
2	(India) S Nehwal	21	21

Quarterfinals
6	(Germany) J Schenk	21	16	21
4	(China) Jiang YJ	14	21	12
(Hong Kong) Yip P Y	11	10
2	(India) S Nehwal	21	21

Semifinals
6	(Germany) J Schenk	19	21	12
2	(India) S Nehwal	21	17	21

=== Final ===
Final
3	(China) Wang Shixian	21	16	17
2	(India) Saina Nehwal	15	21	21

== Men's doubles ==
1. (Malaysia) Koo Kien Keat / Tan Boon Heong
2. (Indonesia) Markis Kido / Hendra Setiawan
3. (South Korea) Jung Jae-sung / Lee Yong-dae
4. (Chinese Taipei) Fang Chieh-min / Lee Sheng-mu
5. (China) Cai Yun / Fu Haifeng
6. (South Korea) Ko Sung-hyun / Yoo Yeon-seong
7. (Indonesia) Alvent Yulianto / Hendra Aprida Gunawan
8. (Chinese Taipei) Chen Hung-ling / Lin Yu-Lang

=== Top half ===
First Round
1	(Malaysia) Koo K K (Malaysia) Tan B H	21	21
(Denmark) M Conrad-Petersen (Denmark) J Rasmussen	17	11
Q1	(Macau) Chan I C (Macau) Lam C M	9	7
(Indonesia) M Ahsan (Indonesia) B Septano	21	21
6	(South Korea) Ko S-h (South Korea) Yoo Y-s	21	21
(Philippines) K Asuncion (Philippines) B Gadi	10	11
(Canada) A Liu (Canada) D Ng	10	15
(Indonesia) L Hadiyanto (Indonesia) C Wijaya	21	21
4	(Chinese Taipei) Fang C-m (Chinese Taipei) Lee S-m	14	20
(United States) H Bach (United States) T Gunawan	21	22
(Netherlands) R Bosch (Netherlands) K Ridder	13	19
(Scotland) R Blair (Indonesia) F Limpele	21	21
8	(Chinese Taipei) Chen H-l (Chinese Taipei) Lin Y-l	20	11
(China) Chai B (China) Guo ZD	22	21
(Malaysia) Chan P S (Malaysia) Lim K W	21	21
Q3	(Hong Kong) Ng K L (Hong Kong) Chun H T	11	12

Second Round
1	(Malaysia) Koo K K (Malaysia) Tan B H	21	18	19
(Indonesia) M Ahsan (Indonesia) B Septano	12	21	21
6	(South Korea) Ko S-h (South Korea) Yoo Y-s	21	21
(Indonesia) L Hadiyanto (Indonesia) C Wijaya	16	10
(United States) H Bach (United States) T Gunawan	9	21	21
(Scotland) R Blair (Indonesia) F Limpele	21	16	19
(China) Chai B (China) Guo ZD	21	21
Q3	(Hong Kong) Ng K L (Hong Kong) Chun H T	15	15

Quarterfinals
(Indonesia) M Ahsan (Indonesia) B Septano	19	19
6	(South Korea) Ko S-h (South Korea) Yoo Y-s	21	21
(United States) H Bach (United States) T Gunawan	21	21
(China) Chai B (China) Guo ZD	15	14

Semifinals
6	(South Korea) Ko S-h (South Korea) Yoo Y-s	21	21
(United States) H Bach (United States) T Gunawan	16	19

=== Bottom half ===
First Round
Q4	(Malaysia) M Z A Latif (Malaysia) Hoon T H	21	21
Q2	(Philippines) P Escueta (Philippines) M Gabriel	9	13
(Malaysia) Gan T C (Malaysia) Tan B S	15	17
5	(China) Cai Y (China) Fu HF	21	21
(Indonesia) A Pratama (Indonesia) R A Saputro	21	21
(Scotland) A Casey (United States) M Fogarty	9	12
(China) Hong W (China) Shen Y	14	12
3	(South Korea) Jung J-s (South Korea) Lee Y-d	21	21
(Hong Kong) Leung C Y (Hong Kong) Y H Wiratama	21	19	17
(Indonesia) Y R Sugiarto (Indonesia) A Y Wirawan	15	21	21
(Chinese Taipei) Liao M-c (Chinese Taipei) Wu C-w	19	8
7	(Indonesia) A Y Chandra (Indonesia) H A Gunawan	21	21
(Thailand) S Anugritayawon (Thailand) S Prapakamol	21	21
PFQ	(Hong Kong) Chan T K (Hong Kong) Lo L K	15	14
(Denmark) R Bonde (Denmark) A Kristiansen	13	18
2	(Indonesia) M Kido (Indonesia) H Setiawan	21	21

Second Round
Q2	(Philippines) P Escueta (Philippines) M Gabriel	16	15
5	(China) Cai Y (China) Fu HF	21	21
(Indonesia) A Pratama (Indonesia) R A Saputro
3	(South Korea) Jung J-s (South Korea) Lee Y-d	w/o
(Indonesia) Y R Sugiarto (Indonesia) A Y Wirawan	18	9
7	(Indonesia) A Y Chandra (Indonesia) H A Gunawan	21	21
(Thailand) S Anugritayawon (Thailand) S Prapakamol	15	15
2	(Indonesia) M Kido (Indonesia) H Setiawan	21	21

Quarterfinals
5	(China) Cai Y (China) Fu HF	19	16
3	(South Korea) Jung J-s (South Korea) Lee Y-d	21	21
7	(Indonesia) A Y Chandra (Indonesia) H A Gunawan
2	(Indonesia) M Kido (Indonesia) H Setiawan	w/o

Semifinals
3	(South Korea) Jung J-s (South Korea) Lee Y-d	19	21
2	(Indonesia) M Kido (Indonesia) H Setiawan	21	23

=== Final ===
Final
6	(South Korea) Ko Sung-hyun (South Korea) Yoo Yeon-seong	21	14	23
2	(Indonesia) Markis Kido (Indonesia) Hendra Setiawan	19	21	21

== Women's doubles ==
1. (Chinese Taipei) Cheng Wen-hsing / Chien Yu-chin
2. (China) Cheng Shu / Zhao Yunlei
3. (Russia) Valeria Sorokina / Nina Vislova
4. (Indonesia) Meiliana Jauhari / Greysia Polii
5. (China) Pan Pan / Tian Qing
6. (Thailand) Duanganong Aroonkesorn / Kunchala Voravichitchaikul
7. (Macau) Zhang Dan / Zhang Zhibo
8. (South Korea) Ha Jung-eun / Jung Kyung-eun

=== Top half ===
First Round
(Hong Kong) Ng W Y (Hong Kong) Cheung Y M	14	15
(United States) E Lee (United States) P L Obanana	21	21
6	(Thailand) D Aroonkesorn (Thailand) K Voravichitchaikul	21	21
(Sweden) E Lennartsson (Sweden) E Wengberg	9	12
(Indonesia) V Marissa (Indonesia) N Melati	21	21
(Canada) A Bruce (Canada) M Li	8	9
3	(Russia) V Sorokina (Russia) N Vislova	21	15	21
(Indonesia) L Nurlita (Thailand) S Thoungthongkam	17	21	18
(Hong Kong) Chan T K (Hong Kong) Chau H W	w/o
(Indonesia) S P Irawati (Indonesia) N K Maheswari
7	(Macau) Zhang D (Macau) Zhang ZB	24	15	18
(Malaysia) Chin E H (Malaysia) Goh L Y	22	21	21
(Chinese Taipei) Chang H-y (Chinese Taipei) Cheng S-c	21	21
(Malaysia) Ng H E (Malaysia) Ng H L	13	11

Second Round
1	(Chinese Taipei) Cheng W-h (Chinese Taipei) Chien Y-c	21	21
(United States) E Lee (United States) P L Obanana	12	15
6	(Thailand) D Aroonkesorn (Thailand) K Voravichitchaikul	21	21	21
(Indonesia) V Marissa (Indonesia) N Melati	19	23	15
3	(Russia) V Sorokina (Russia) N Vislova	21	21
(Hong Kong) Chan T K (Hong Kong) Chau H W	18	9
(Malaysia) Chin E H (Malaysia) Goh L Y	21	19	21
(Chinese Taipei) Chang H-y (Chinese Taipei) Cheng S-c	16	21	15

Quarterfinals
1	(Chinese Taipei) Cheng W-h (Chinese Taipei) Chien Y-c	21	21
6	(Thailand) D Aroonkesorn (Thailand) K Voravichitchaikul	13	14
3	(Russia) V Sorokina (Russia) N Vislova	21	14	21
(Malaysia) Chin E H (Malaysia) Goh L Y	13	21	17

Semifinals
1	(Chinese Taipei) Cheng W-h (Chinese Taipei) Chien Y-c	18	21	21
3	(Russia) V Sorokina (Russia) N Vislova	21	12	13

=== Bottom half ===
First Round
(Chinese Taipei) Hsieh P-c (Chinese Taipei) Wang P-r	21	21
(Hong Kong) Si C J (Hong Kong) Yan H W	13	11
(Hong Kong) Cheung N Y (Hong Kong) Mong K Y	8	17
5	(China) Pan P (China) Tian Q	21	21
(Denmark) C Pedersen (Denmark) K Rytter Juhl	21	21
(Chinese Taipei) Hung S-c (Chinese Taipei) Yang C-c	6	18
(Hong Kong) Ng K S (Hong Kong) Shek H Y	5	15
4	(Indonesia) M Jauhari (Indonesia) Greysia Polii	21	21
(Hong Kong) Tsang W C (Hong Kong) Yuen S Y	19	13
(United States) I Wang (United States) R Wang	21	21
(Hong Kong) Poon L Y (Hong Kong) Tse Y S	21	12	21
8	(South Korea) Ha J-e (South Korea) Jung K-e	17	21	14
(China) Wang XL (China) Yu Y	21	21
(United States) P Phongasavithas (United States) V Phongasavithas	2	3
(Hong Kong) Chan H Y (Hong Kong) Yeung Y K	14	8
2	(China) Cheng S (China) Zhao YL	21	21

Second Round
(Chinese Taipei) Hsieh P-c (Chinese Taipei) Wang P-r	15	18
5	(China) Pan P (China) Tian Q	21	21
(Denmark) C Pedersen (Denmark) K Rytter Juhl	21	21
4	(Indonesia) M Jauhari (Indonesia) G Polii	15	16
(United States) I Wang (United States) R Wang	11	15
(Hong Kong) Poon L Y (Hong Kong) Tse Y S	21	21
(China) Wang XL (China) Yu Y	21	21
2	(China) Cheng S (China) Zhao YL	15	13

Quarterfinals
5	(China) Pan P (China) Tian Q	21	21
(Denmark) C Pedersen (Denmark) K Rytter Juhl	19	18
(Hong Kong) Poon L Y (Hong Kong) Tse Y S	16	12
(China) Wang XL (China) Yu Y	21	21

Semifinals
5	(China) Pan P (China) Tian Q	9	8
(China) Wang XL (China) Yu Y	21	21

=== Final ===
Final
1	(Chinese Taipei) Cheng Wen-hsing (Chinese Taipei) Chien Yu-chin	11	12
	(China) Wang Xiaoli (China) Yu Yang	21	21

== Mixed doubles ==
1. (Poland) Robert Mateusiak / Nadieżda Kostiuczyk
2. (Indonesia) Hendra Aprida Gunawan / Vita Marissa
3. (Thailand) Sudket Prapakamol / Saralee Thungthongkam
4. (England) Nathan Robertson / Jenny Wallwork
5. (China) Zhang Nan / Zhao Yunlei
6. (Denmark) Joachim Fischer Nielsen / Christinna Pedersen
7. (Thailand) Songphon Anugritayawon / Kunchala Voravichitchaikul
8. (Chinese Taipei) Lee Sheng-mu / Chien Yu-chin

=== Top half ===
First Round
1	(Poland) R Mateusiak (Poland) N Zieba	20	21	21
(Chinese Taipei) Fang C-m (Chinese Taipei) Wang P-r	22	9	15
Q3	(Malaysia) Hoon T H (Malaysia) Ng H E	11	6
(China) Tao JM (China) Tian Q	21	21
6	(Denmark) J Fischer Nielsen (Denmark) C Pedersen	23	21
(Indonesia) M Kido (Indonesia) L Nurlita	21	9
(United States) H H Ho (United States) E Lee	13	15
(Hong Kong) Wong W H (Hong Kong) Chau H W	21	21
4	(England) N Robertson (England) J Wallwork	19	21	19
(South Korea) Yoo Y-s (South Korea) Kim M-j	21	12	21
(Indonesia) M Rizal (Indonesia) D Susanto	21	21
Q4	(Philippines) K Asuncion (Philippines) K Asuncion	11	10
7	(Thailand) S Anugritayawon (Thailand) K Voravichitchaikul	18	22
(China) Xu C (China) Yu Y	21	24
(Canada) D Ng (Canada) A Bruce	11	10
(Chinese Taipei) Liao M-c (Chinese Taipei) Chen H-h	21	21

Second Round
1	(Poland) R Matuesiak (Poland) N Zieba	21	18	24
(China) Tao JM (China) Tian Q	14	21	22
6	(Denmark) J Fischer Nielsen (Denmark) C Pedersen	21	21
(Hong Kong) Wong W H (Hong Kong) Chau H W	14	19
(South Korea) Yoo Y-s (South Korea) Kim M-j	21	21
(Indonesia) M Rizal (Indonesia) D Susanto	12	17
(China) Xu C (China) Yu Y	21	21
(Chinese Taipei) Liao M-c (Chinese Taipei) Chen H-h	9	19

Quarterfinals
1	(Poland) R Mateusiak (Poland) N Zieba	18	15
6	(Denmark) J Fischer Nielsen (Denmark) C Pedersen	21	21
(South Korea) Yoo Y-s (South Korea) Kim M-j	12	21	14
(China) Xu C (China) Yu Y	21	19	21

Semifinals
6	(Denmark) J Fischer Nielsen (Denmark) C Pedersen	16	21	21
(China) Xu C (China) Yu Y	21	18	19

=== Bottom half ===
First Round
(Indonesia) T Ahmad (Indonesia) L Natsir	21	21
(Chinese Taipei) Chen H-l (Chinese Taipei) Cheng W-h	18	17
Q1	(Hong Kong) Ho W L (Hong Kong) Shek H Y	9	10
5	(China) Zhang N (China) Zhao YL	21	21
(South Korea) Ko S-h (South Korea) Ha J-e	21	21
Q2	(Hong Kong) Chan T K (Hong Kong) Yeung Y K	5	9
(China) He HB (China) Ma J	21	21
3	(Thailand) S Prapakamol (Thailand) S Thoungthongkam	9	9
PFQ	(Malaysia) Koo K K (Malaysia) Chin E H	19	21	12
(South Korea) Kim K-j (South Korea) Jang Y-n	21	16	21
(Hong Kong) Leung C Y (Hong Kong) Ng K S	9	14
8	(Chinese Taipei) Lee S-m (Chinese Taipei) Chien Y-c	21	21
(Indonesia) F K Teng (Indonesia) P Z Bernadeth	21	21
(Canada) A Liu (Canada) J Ko	7	12
(Malaysia) Chan P S (Malaysia) Goh L Y	21	15	21
2	(Indonesia) H A Gunawan (Indonesia) V Marissa	14	21	16

Second Round
(Indonesia) T Ahmad (Indonesia) L Natsir	21	17	17
5	(China) Zhang N (China) Zhao YL	10	21	21
(South Korea) Ko S-h (South Korea) Ha J-e	21	21
(China) He HB (China) Ma J	16	15
(South Korea) Kim K-j (South Korea) Jang Y-n	16	21	15
8	(Chinese Taipei) Lee S-m (Chinese Taipei) Chien Y-c	21	16	21
(Indonesia) F K Teng (Indonesia) P Z Bernadeth	20	21	21
(Malaysia) Chan P S (Malaysia) Goh L Y	22	19	18

Quarterfinals
5	(China) Zhang N (China) Zhao YL	20	22	21
(South Korea) Ko S-h (South Korea) Ha J-e	22	20	11
8	(Chinese Taipei) Lee S-m (Chinese Taipei) Chien Y-c	12	21	21
(Indonesia) F K Teng (Indonesia) P Z Bernadeth	21	15	16

Semifinals
5	(China) Zhang N (China) Zhao YL	21	21
8	(Chinese Taipei) Lee S-m (Chinese Taipei) Chien Y-c	15	11

=== Final ===
Final
6	(Denmark) Joachim Fischer Nielsen (Denmark) Christinna Pedersen	22	14	22
5	(China) Zhang Nan (China) Zhao Yunlei	20	21	20

Preceded by 2009 Hong Kong Super Series	Hong Kong Super Series	Succeeded by 2011 Hong Kong Super Series
Preceded by 2010 China Open Super Series	2010 BWF Super Series	Succeeded by 2010 BWF Super Series Masters Finals
