= Joachim Fischer Nielsen =

Danish badminton player

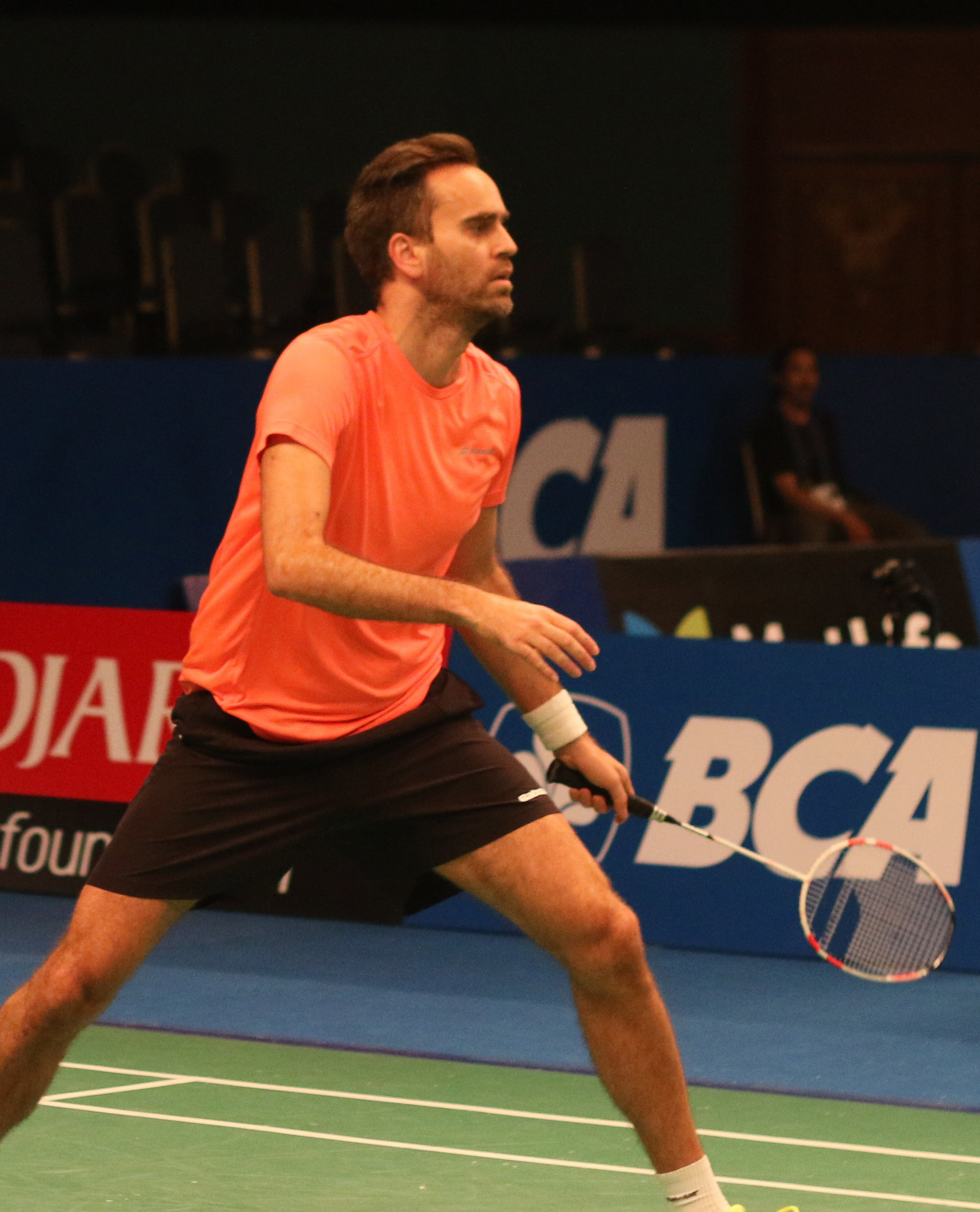
- Fischer Nielsen at 2017 Indonesia Open

Personal information
- Born: 23 November 1978 (age 47) Gentofte, Denmark
- Height: 1.93 m (6 ft 4 in)
- Weight: 78 kg (172 lb)

Sport
- Country: Denmark
- Sport: Badminton
- Handedness: Left
- Retired: 2018

Men's & mixed doubles
- Highest ranking: 194 (MD 29 August 2013); 1 (XD with Christinna Pedersen 2 April 2015)
- BWF profile
Medal record
Men's badminton
Representing Denmark
Olympic Games
Bronze medal – third place	2012 London	Mixed doubles
World Championships
Bronze medal – third place	2009 Hyderabad	Mixed doubles
Bronze medal – third place	2014 Copenhagen	Mixed doubles
Sudirman Cup
Silver medal – second place	2011 Qingdao	Mixed team
Bronze medal – third place	2013 Kuala Lumpur	Mixed team
Thomas Cup
Bronze medal – third place	2012 Wuhan	Men's team
European Championships
Gold medal – first place	2014 Kazan	Mixed doubles
Gold medal – first place	2016 La Roche-sur-Yon	Mixed doubles
Silver medal – second place	2017 Kolding	Mixed doubles
European Mixed Team Championships
Gold medal – first place	2015 Leuven	Mixed team
Gold medal – first place	2017 Lubin	Mixed team
Silver medal – second place	2013 Moscow	Mixed team

Joachim Fischer Nielsen (born 23 November 1978) is a Danish retired badminton player. At the 2012 Summer Olympics, he won the bronze medal in the mixed doubles with teammate Christinna Pedersen. He retired from the international tournament in the end of 2018.

Fischer Nielsen was named Badminton Denmark 2011 Player of the Year together with his partner in the mixed doubles Christinna Pedersen. He was later received Badminton Denmark's merit.

== Achievements ==
=== Olympic Games ===
Mixed doubles
Year	Venue	Partner	Opponent	Score	Result
2012	Wembley Arena, London, Great Britain	(Denmark) Christinna Pedersen	(Indonesia) Tontowi Ahmad (Indonesia) Liliyana Natsir	21–12, 21–12	Bronze

=== BWF World Championships ===
Mixed doubles
Year	Venue	Partner	Opponent	Score	Result
2009	Gachibowli Indoor Stadium, Hyderabad, India	(Denmark) Christinna Pedersen	(Indonesia) Nova Widianto (Indonesia) Liliyana Natsir	18–21, 21–14, 18–21	Bronze
2014	Ballerup Super Arena, Copenhagen, Denmark	(Denmark) Christinna Pedersen	(China) Xu Chen (China) Ma Jin	15–21, 9–21	Bronze

=== European Championships ===
Mixed doubles
Year	Venue	Partner	Opponent	Score	Result
2014	Gymnastics Center, Kazan, Russia	(Denmark) Christinna Pedersen	(Denmark) Mads Pieler Kolding (Denmark) Kamilla Rytter Juhl	22–24, 21–13, 21–18	Gold
2016	Vendéspace, La Roche-sur-Yon, France	(Denmark) Christinna Pedersen	(Denmark) Niclas Nøhr (Denmark) Sara Thygesen	19–21, 21–13, 21–17	Gold
2017	Sydbank Arena, Kolding, Denmark	(Denmark) Christinna Pedersen	(England) Chris Adcock (England) Gabby Adcock	17–21, 21–18, 19–21	Silver

=== BWF Superseries ===
The BWF Superseries, which was launched on 14 December 2006 and implemented in 2007, was a series of elite badminton tournaments, sanctioned by the Badminton World Federation (BWF). BWF Superseries levels were Superseries and Superseries Premier. A season of Superseries consisted of twelve tournaments around the world that had been introduced since 2011. Successful players were invited to the Superseries Finals, which were held at the end of each year.

Mixed doubles
Year	Tournament	Partner	Opponent	Score	Result
2008	Denmark Open	(Denmark) Christinna Pedersen	(Denmark) Thomas Laybourn (Denmark) Kamilla Rytter Juhl	21–14, 21–17	(gold) Winner
2009	Japan Open	(Denmark) Christinna Pedersen	(Thailand) Songphon Anugritayawon (Thailand) Kunchala Voravichitchaikul	21–13, 16–21, 20–22	(silver) Runner-up
2009	Denmark Open	(Denmark) Christinna Pedersen	(England) Anthony Clark (England) Donna Kellogg	21–16, 25–27, 21–17	(gold) Winner
2009	World Superseries Finals	(Denmark) Christinna Pedersen	(India) Valiyaveetil Diju (India) Jwala Gutta	21–14, 21–18	(gold) Winner
2010	Hong Kong Open	(Denmark) Christinna Pedersen	(China) Zhang Nan (China) Zhao Yunlei	22–20, 14–21, 22–20	(gold) Winner
2011	Japan Open	(Denmark) Christinna Pedersen	(Chinese Taipei) Chen Hung-ling (Chinese Taipei) Chen Wen-hsing	19–21, 21–16, 15–21	(silver) Runner-up
2011	Denmark Open	(Denmark) Christinna Pedersen	(China) Xu Chen (China) Ma Jin	22–20, 21–16	(gold) Winner
2011	French Open	(Denmark) Christinna Pedersen	(China) Xu Chen (China) Ma Jin	21–17, 21–14	(gold) Winner
2011	Hong Kong Open	(Denmark) Christinna Pedersen	(China) Zhang Nan (China) Zhao Yunlei	21–15, 17–21, 17–21	(silver) Runner-up
2011	China Open	(Denmark) Christinna Pedersen	(China) Zhang Nan (China) Zhao Yunlei	11–21, 14–21	(silver) Runner-up
2012	World Superseries Finals	(Denmark) Christinna Pedersen	(China) Zhang Nan (China) Zhao Yunlei	17–21, 21–12, 21–14	(gold) Winner
2013	Malaysia Open	(Denmark) Christinna Pedersen	(Malaysia) Chan Peng Soon (Malaysia) Goh Liu Ying	21–13, 21–18	(gold) Winner
2013	Indonesia Open	(Denmark) Christinna Pedersen	(China) Zhang Nan (China) Zhao Yunlei	22–24, 22–20, 12–21	(silver) Runner-up
2013	China Open	(Denmark) Christinna Pedersen	(Indonesia) Tontowi Ahmad (Indonesia) Liliyana Natsir	10–21, 21–5, 17–21	(silver) Runner-up
2013	World Superseries Finals	(Denmark) Christinna Pedersen	(China) Zhang Nan (China) Zhao Yunlei	12–21, 21–19, 21–10	(gold) Winner
2014	Malaysia Open	(Denmark) Christinna Pedersen	(China) Xu Chen (China) Ma Jin	11–21, 21–17, 13–21	(silver) Runner-up
2014	India Open	(Denmark) Christinna Pedersen	(South Korea) Ko Sung-hyun (South Korea) Kim Ha-na	21–16, 18–21, 21–18	(gold) Winner
2014	Indonesia Open	(Denmark) Christinna Pedersen	(China) Xu Chen (China) Ma Jin	18–21, 21–16, 21–14	(gold) Winner
2015	India Open	(Denmark) Christinna Pedersen	(China) Liu Cheng (China) Bao Yixin	19–21, 19–21	(silver) Runner-up
2015	Japan Open	(Denmark) Christinna Pedersen	(China) Zhang Nan (China) Zhao Yunlei	17–21, 21–18, 23–21	(gold) Winner
2015	China Open	(Denmark) Christinna Pedersen	(China) Zhang Nan (China) Zhao Yunlei	19–21, 21–17, 19–21	(silver) Runner-up
2016	All England Open	(Denmark) Christinna Pedersen	(Indonesia) Praveen Jordan (Indonesia) Debby Susanto	12–21, 17–21	(silver) Runner-up
2016	Denmark Open	(Denmark) Christinna Pedersen	(China) Zheng Siwei (China) Chen Qingchen	21–16, 22–20	(gold) Winner

BWF Super Series Finals tournament
BWF Super Series Premier tournament
BWF Super Series tournament

=== BWF Grand Prix ===
The BWF Grand Prix had two levels, the Grand Prix and Grand Prix Gold. It was a series of badminton tournaments sanctioned by the Badminton World Federation (BWF) and played between 2007 and 2017. The World Badminton Grand Prix was sanctioned by the International Badminton Federation from 1983 to 2006.

Men's doubles
Year	Tournament	Partner	Opponent	Score	Result
2004	German Open	(Denmark) Jesper Larsen	(Denmark) Mathias Boe (Denmark) Carsten Mogensen	6–15, 14–17	(silver) Runner-up
2006	Denmark Open	(Denmark) Mathias Boe	(Denmark) Lars Paaske (Denmark) Jonas Rasmussen	21–18, 10–21, 17–21	(silver) Runner-up
2006	Bulgaria Open	(Denmark) Mathias Boe	(Denmark) Anders Kristiansen (Denmark) Simon Mollyhus	18–21, 21–18, 25–23	(gold) Winner

Mixed doubles
Year	Tournament	Partner	Opponent	Score	Result
2008	Bitburger Open	(Denmark) Christinna Pedersen	(India) Valiyaveetil Diju (India) Jwala Gutta	21–8, 17–21, 20–22	(silver) Runner-up
2008	Dutch Open	(Denmark) Christinna Pedersen	(Indonesia) Fran Kurniawan (Indonesia) Shendy Puspa Irawati	21–17, 21–9	(gold) Winner
2011	Swiss Open	(Denmark) Christinna Pedersen	(England) Nathan Robertson (England) Jenny Wallwork	23–21, 21–14	(gold) Winner
2013	Swiss Open	(Denmark) Christinna Pedersen	(China) Zhang Nan (China) Tang Jinhua	22–20, 21–19	(gold) Winner
2015	Malaysia Masters	(Denmark) Christinna Pedersen	(Indonesia) Praveen Jordan (Indonesia) Debby Susanto	21–18, 21–18	(gold) Winner
2015	German Open	(Denmark) Christinna Pedersen	(Denmark) Mads Pieler Kolding (Denmark) Kamilla Rytter Juhl	18–21, 17–21	(silver) Runner-up

BWF Grand Prix Gold tournament
BWF Grand Prix tournament

=== BWF/IBF International Challenge/Series ===
Men's singles
Year	Tournament	Opponent	Score	Result
1997	Iceland International	(Denmark) Niels Christian Kaldau	12–15, 1–15	(silver) Runner-up
2000	Romanian International	(Germany) Oliver Pongratz	4–15, 0–4 retired	(silver) Runner-up
2001	Spanish International	(Germany) Conrad Hückstädt	15–5, 15–7	(gold) Winner
2003	French International	(Germany) Marc Zwiebler	3–15, 15–8, 12–15	(silver) Runner-up
2004	Iceland International	(Canada) Bobby Milroy	15–12, 15–7	(gold) Winner
2004	Spanish Open	(Netherlands) Robert Kwee	15–4, 15–4	(gold) Winner
2005	Bulgarian International	(Denmark) Michael Christensen	15–7, 15–5	(gold) Winner

Men's doubles
Year	Tournament	Partner	Opponent	Score	Result
1997	Iceland International	(Denmark) Niels Christian Kaldau	(Iceland) Árni Þór Hallgrímson (Iceland) Broddi Kristjánsson	15–5, 15–7	(gold) Winner
1998	Amor International	(Denmark) Kasper Ødum	(Netherlands) Dennis Lens (Netherlands) Joris van Soerland	10–15, 15–8, 15–5	(gold) Winner
1998	Hungarian International	(Denmark) Kasper Ødum	(Poland) Michał Łogosz (Poland) Robert Mateusiak	15–11, 8–15, 4–15	(silver) Runner-up
2000	BMW Open International	(Denmark) Michael Søgaard	(Sweden) Henrik Andersson (Sweden) Fredrik Bergström	15–10, 15–8	(gold) Winner
2000	Portugal International	(Denmark) Janek Roos	(Denmark) Thomas Hovgaard (Denmark) Ove Svejstrup	12–15, 15–2,15–0	(gold) Winner
2000	Austrian International	(Denmark) Janek Roos	(Austria) Harald Koch (Austria) Jürgen Koch	12–15, 15–8, 15–9	(gold) Winner
2003	French International	(Denmark) Carsten Mogensen	(Russia) Stanislav Pukhov (Russia) Nikolai Zuyev	15–13, 15–9	(gold) Winner
2003	Iceland International	(Denmark) Jesper Larsen	(England) David Lindley (England) Kristian Roebuck	15–8, 15–9	(gold) Winner
2004	Swedish International	(Denmark) Jesper Larsen	(Poland) Michał Łogosz (Poland) Robert Mateusiak	15–4, 13–15, 12–15	(silver) Runner-up
2004	French International	(Denmark) Jesper Larsen	(Malaysia) Gan Teik Chai (Malaysia) Koo Kien Keat	6–15, 15–17	(silver) Runner-up
2004	Spanish Open	(Denmark) Jesper Larsen	(Wales) Matthew Hughes (Wales) Martyn Lewis	15–6, 15–5	(gold) Winner
2018	Spanish International	(Denmark) Frederik Colberg	(Thailand) Bodin Isara (Thailand) Maneepong Jongjit	21–23, 21–19, 21–15	(gold) Winner

Mixed doubles
Year	Tournament	Partner	Opponent	Score	Result
1997	Iceland International	(Denmark) Jane F. Bramsen	(Sweden) Tómas Viborg (Iceland) Erla Björg Hafsteinsdóttir	15–5, 15–2	(gold) Winner
2007	Spanish Open	(Denmark) Britta Andersen	(Germany) Ingo Kindervater (Germany) Kathrin Piotrowski	22–24, 22–20, 23–21	(gold) Winner

BWF International Challenge tournament
BWF International Series tournament
