= Badminton at the 2010 Asian Games – Mixed doubles =

Mixed doubles at the 2010 Asian Games
- Venue: Tianhe Gymnasium
- Dates: 17–21 November
- Competitors: 42 from 11 nations

Medalists
gold medal	Shin Baek-cheol; Lee Hyo-jung	South Korea
silver medal	Zhang Nan; Zhao Yunlei	China
bronze medal	Chen Hung-ling; Cheng Wen-hsing	Chinese Taipei
bronze medal	He Hanbin; Ma Jin	China

The badminton mixed doubles tournament at the 2010 Asian Games in Guangzhou took place from 17 November to 21 November at Tianhe Gymnasium.

== Schedule ==
All times are China Standard Time (UTC+08:00)

Date	Time	Event
Wednesday, 17 November 2010	09:30	Round of 32
Thursday, 18 November 2010	09:00	Round of 16
Friday, 19 November 2010	09:00	Quarterfinals
Saturday, 20 November 2010	13:00	Semifinals
Sunday, 21 November 2010	19:30	Final

== Results ==
=== Final ===
Final
8	Zhang Nan (CHN); Zhao Yunlei (CHN)	19	14
	Shin Baek-cheol (KOR); Lee Hyo-jung (KOR)	21	21

=== Top half ===
First round
Koo Kien Keat (MAS); Woon Khe Wei (MAS)	10	9
Tontowi Ahmad (INA); Liliyana Natsir (INA)	21	21
Arun Vishnu (IND); Aparna Balan (IND)	22	7	12
Shintaro Ikeda (JPN); Reiko Shiota (JPN)	20	21	21

Second round
1	Sudket Prapakamol (THA); Saralee Thungthongkam (THA)	21	21
Yohan Hadikusumo (HKG); Tse Ying Suet (HKG)	16	13
5	Chen Hung-ling (TPE); Cheng Wen-hsing (TPE)	21	21
Tontowi Ahmad (INA); Liliyana Natsir (INA)	17	15
3	Ko Sung-hyun (KOR); Ha Jung-eun (KOR)	21	21
Ratnajit Tamang (NEP); Sujana Shrestha (NEP)	6	5
8	Zhang Nan (CHN); Zhao Yunlei (CHN)	17	21	21
Shintaro Ikeda (JPN); Reiko Shiota (JPN)	21	12	17

Quarter-finals
1	Sudket Prapakamol (THA); Saralee Thungthongkam (THA)	19	8
5	Chen Hung-ling (TPE); Cheng Wen-hsing (TPE)	21	21
3	Ko Sung-hyun (KOR); Ha Jung-eun (KOR)	14	21	14
8	Zhang Nan (CHN); Zhao Yunlei (CHN)	21	15	21

Semi-finals
5	Chen Hung-ling (TPE); Cheng Wen-hsing (TPE)	16	15
8	Zhang Nan (CHN); Zhao Yunlei (CHN)	21	21

=== Bottom half ===
First round
Chan Io Chong (MAC); Long Ying (MAC)	7	21	10
Hirokatsu Hashimoto (JPN); Mizuki Fujii (JPN)	21	17	21
Chan Peng Soon (MAS); Goh Liu Ying (MAS)	10	14
Shin Baek-cheol (KOR); Lee Hyo-jung (KOR)	21	21
He Hanbin (CHN); Ma Jin (CHN)	21	21
Wong Wai Hong (HKG); Chau Hoi Wah (HKG)	18	14

Second round
Hirokatsu Hashimoto (JPN); Mizuki Fujii (JPN)	13	9
7	Songphon Anugritayawon (THA); Kunchala Voravichitchaikul (THA)	21	21
Shin Baek-cheol (KOR); Lee Hyo-jung (KOR)	17	21	21
4	Valiyaveetil Diju (IND); Jwala Gutta (IND)	21	13	16
He Hanbin (CHN); Ma Jin (CHN)	15	21	21
6	Fran Kurniawan (INA); Pia Zebadiah Bernadet (INA)	21	18	16
Bikash Shrestha (NEP); Sara Devi Tamang (NEP)	8	4
2	Lee Sheng-mu (TPE); Chien Yu-chin (TPE)	21	21

Quarter-finals
7	Songphon Anugritayawon (THA); Kunchala Voravichitchaikul (THA)	16	17
Shin Baek-cheol (KOR); Lee Hyo-jung (KOR)	21	21
He Hanbin (CHN); Ma Jin (CHN)	21	21
2	Lee Sheng-mu (TPE); Chien Yu-chin (TPE)	17	15

Semi-finals
Shin Baek-cheol (KOR); Lee Hyo-jung (KOR)	20	21	22
He Hanbin (CHN); Ma Jin (CHN)	22	18	20
