= 2014 BWF World Championships =

Tournament details
- Dates: 25 August – 31 August
- Edition: 21st
- Level: International
- Venue: Ballerup Super Arena
- Location: Copenhagen, Denmark

The 2014 BWF World Championships was a badminton tournament which was held from 25 to 31 August 2014 at the Ballerup Super Arena in Copenhagen, Denmark.

== Host city selection ==
Copenhagen and Macau submitted bids for this of championships. Both cities also bid for the 2013 edition, which was later won by Guangzhou. On 9 December 2011, Badminton World Federation decided to award the championships to Copenhagen during a meeting in Queenstown, New Zealand.

== Draw ==
The draw was held on 11 August 2014 at the Berjaya Times Square in Kuala Lumpur, Malaysia.

== Schedule ==
All five events started on the first day and concluded with the final on the last day.

All times are local (UTC+2).

Date	Time	Round
25 August 2014	10:00	Round of 64
25 August 2014	10:00	Round of 48
26 August 2014	11:00	Round of 64
26 August 2014	11:00	Round of 32
26 August 2014	11:00	Round of 48
27 August 2014	11:00	Round of 32
28 August 2014	13:00	Round of 16
29 August 2014	10:00	Quarterfinals
30 August 2014	10:00	Semifinals
31 August 2014	12:30	Finals

== Medalists ==
Event	Gold	Silver	Bronze
Men's singles	Chen Long; China	Lee Chong Wei; Malaysia	Viktor Axelsen; Denmark
Men's singles	Chen Long; China	Lee Chong Wei; Malaysia	Tommy Sugiarto; Indonesia
Women's singles	Carolina Marín; Spain	Li Xuerui; China	Minatsu Mitani; Japan
Women's singles	Carolina Marín; Spain	Li Xuerui; China	P. V. Sindhu; India
Men's doubles	South Korea; Ko Sung-hyun; Shin Baek-cheol	South Korea; Lee Yong-dae; Yoo Yeon-seong	Denmark; Mathias Boe; Carsten Mogensen
Men's doubles	South Korea; Ko Sung-hyun; Shin Baek-cheol	South Korea; Lee Yong-dae; Yoo Yeon-seong	South Korea; Kim Ki-jung; Kim Sa-rang
Women's doubles	China; Tian Qing; Zhao Yunlei	China; Wang Xiaoli; Yu Yang	South Korea; Lee So-hee; Shin Seung-chan
Women's doubles	China; Tian Qing; Zhao Yunlei	China; Wang Xiaoli; Yu Yang	Japan; Reika Kakiiwa; Miyuki Maeda
Mixed doubles	China; Zhang Nan; Zhao Yunlei	China; Xu Chen; Ma Jin	Denmark; Joachim Fischer Nielsen; Christinna Pedersen
Mixed doubles	China; Zhang Nan; Zhao Yunlei	China; Xu Chen; Ma Jin	China; Liu Cheng; Bao Yixin

== Medal table ==
* Host nation (Denmark)

Rank	Nation	Gold	Silver	Bronze	Total
1	China (CHN)	3	3	1	7
2	South Korea (KOR)	1	1	2	4
3	Spain (ESP)	1	0	0	1
4	Malaysia (MAS)	0	1	0	1
5	Denmark (DEN)*	0	0	3	3
6	Japan (JPN)	0	0	2	2
7	India (IND)	0	0	1	1
7	Indonesia (INA)	0	0	1	1
Totals (8 entries)		5	5	10	20
