= Ballerup Super Arena =

Multi-purpose indoor arena, in Ballerup, Denmark

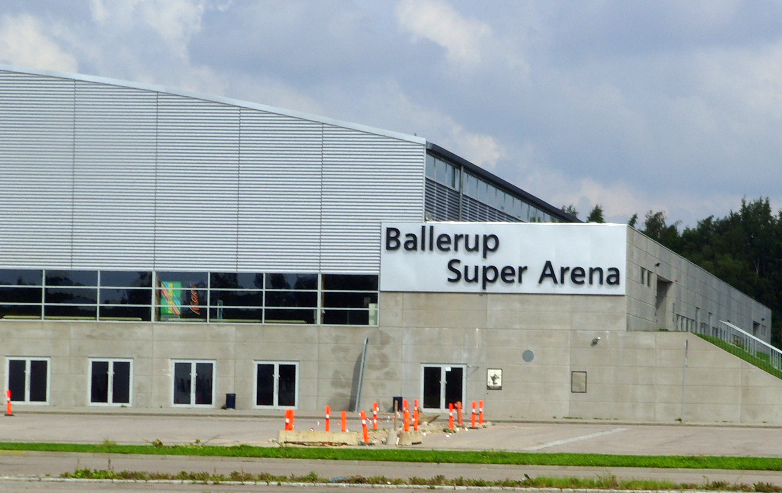
- Ballerup Super Arena in August 2005
- Interactive map of Ballerup Super Arena
- Former names: Siemens Arena (2001–05)
- Location: Ballerup, Copenhagen, Denmark
- Coordinates: 55°43′17.74″N 12°22′9.45″E
- Owner: Ballerup Municipality
- Capacity: 6,500 (seated); 9,200 (standing)
- Surface: Wood

Construction
- Opened: 2001
- Renovated: 2003–05

Tenants
- Six Days of Copenhagen (2001-present); AG København (2010–12); UCI Track Cycling World Championships (2002, 2010, 2024); 2014 BWF World Championships; Dansk Melodi Grand Prix 2011

Ballerup Super Arena (formerly Siemens Arena) is a multi-purpose indoor arena, in Ballerup, Denmark. The velodrome has a seated capacity of 6,500. During concerts, the arena can accommodate an audience of up to 9,200. It is owned by Ballerup Municipality. The arena is also a venue for many company events, conferences, team building events, trade fairs, company sports events and cycling events.

The arena was opened in 2001. In 2003, the roof collapsed, as a result of a miscalculation in design and the new roof was reinforced with cables. It's the only international indoor velodrome in the Nordic countries.

== Events ==
It hosts one of Denmark's two indoor velodromes and is often used for six-day racing and UCI Track Cycling World Cup Classics events. It was the host for the UCI Track Cycling World Championships in 2002, 2010 and 2024. The cycling track is a 250 metres (820 ft) track made of wood.

In 2009 it hosted the World Taekwondo Championships.

The arena hosted Dansk Melodi Grand Prix 2011 on 26 February, the first time Copenhagen hosted the competition since 2002.

It also hosted the 2014 BWF World Championships.

== See also ==
- List of cycling tracks and velodromes
- List of indoor arenas in Denmark
- List of indoor arenas in Nordic countries

Preceded by Antwerps Sportpaleis; Antwerp	UCI Track Cycling World Championships; Venue; 2002	Succeeded by Hanns-Martin-Schleyer-Halle; Stuttgart
Preceded by BGŻ Arena; Pruszków	UCI Track Cycling World Championships; Venue; 2010	Succeeded by Omnisport Apeldoorn; Apeldoorn
