= 2009 BWF World Championships – Women's doubles =

Women's doubles at the 2009 BWF World Championships
- Venue: Gachibowli Indoor Stadium
- Location: Hyderabad, India
- Dates: August 10, 2009 – August 16, 2009

Medalists
gold medal	Zhang Yawen; Zhao Tingting	China
silver medal	Cheng Shu; Zhao Yunlei	China
bronze medal	Du Jing; Yu Yang	China
bronze medal	Ma Jin; Wang Xiaoli	China

The 2009 BWF World Championships was the 17th tournament of the World Badminton Championships. It was held at the Gachibowli Indoor Stadium in Hyderabad, Andhra Pradesh, India, from 10 to 16 August, 2009. Following the results of the women's doubles.

== Seeds ==
1. (Malaysia) Chin Eei Hui / Wong Pei Tty (third round)
2. (China) Cheng Shu / Zhao Yunlei (final)
3. (South Korea) Lee Hyo-jung / Lee Kyung-won (quarter-final)
4. (South Korea) Ha Jung-eun / Kim Min-jung (quarter-final)
5. (China) Du Jing / Yu Yang (semi-final)
6. (China) Ma Jin / Wang Xiaoli (semi-final)
7. (Chinese Taipei) Cheng Wen-hsing / Chien Yu-chin (quarter-final)
8. (China) Zhang Yawen / Zhao Tingting (champion)
9. (Denmark) Lena Frier Kristiansen / Kamilla Rytter Juhl (third round)
10. (Indonesia) Shendy Puspa Irawati / Meiliana Jauhari (third round)
11. (Japan) Miyuki Maeda / Satoko Suetsuna (quarter-final)
12. (Denmark) Helle Nielsen / Marie Røpke (third round)
13. (Indonesia) Greysia Polii / Nitya Krishinda Maheswari (third round)
14. (Russia) Valeria Sorokina / Nina Vislova (withdrew)
15. (Singapore) Shinta Mulia Sari / Yao Lei (third round)
16. (Japan) Mizuki Fujii / Reika Kakiiwa (third round)

== Main stage ==
=== Section 1 ===
First round
(Thailand) S Amitrapai (Thailand) V Munkit	15	21	17
(Bulgaria) P Nedelcheva (Bulgaria) D Popstoikova	21	8	21
(Malaysia) Lim YL (Malaysia) M Ng	8	16
(Japan) S Matsuo (Japan) M Naito	21	21

Second round
1	(Malaysia) Chin EH (Malaysia) Wong PT	21	21
(Sweden) E Wengberg (Sweden) E Lennartsson	13	11
11	(Japan) M Maeda (Japan) S Suetsuna	21	21
(Bulgaria) P Nedelcheva (Bulgaria) D Popstoikova	13	16
5	(China) Du J (China) Yu Y	21	21
(Belgium) S Annys (Belgium) S Corvilain	5	6
13	(Indonesia) G Polii (Indonesia) NK Maheswari	19	21	21
(Japan) S Matsuo (Japan) M Naito	21	15	12

Third round
1	(Malaysia) Chin EH (Malaysia) Wong PT	19	21	12
11	(Japan) M Maeda (Japan) S Suetsuna	21	19	21
5	(China) Du J (China) Yu Y	22	21
13	(Indonesia) G Polii (Indonesia) NK Maheswari	20	12

Quarterfinals
11	(Japan) M Maeda (Japan) S Suetsuna	17	8
5	(China) Du J (China) Yu Y	21	21

=== Section 2 ===
First round
(Germany) B Overzier (Germany) S Marinello	wo
(Ukraine) A Kobceva (Ukraine) E Prus
14	(Russia) V Sorokina (Russia) N Vislova	wo
(Singapore) V Neo (Singapore) F Liu
(New Zealand) D Barry (New Zealand) D Haliday	17	20
(Hong Kong) Chan TK (Hong Kong) Tse YS	21	22

Second round
4	(South Korea) Ha J-e (South Korea) Kim M-j	18	21	21
(South Korea) Ko H-j (South Korea) Park S-y	21	17	17
12	(Denmark) H Nielsen (Denmark) M Røpke	21	21
(Ukraine) A Kobceva (Ukraine) E Prus	15	14
8	(China) Zhang YW (China) Zhao TT	21	21
(Nigeria) G Daniel (Nigeria) M Gideon	8	10
(Singapore) V Neo (Singapore) F Liu	17	21	21
(Hong Kong) Chan TK (Hong Kong) Tse YS	21	13	12

Third round
4	(South Korea) Ha J-e (South Korea) Kim M-j	21	22
12	(Denmark) H Nielsen (Denmark) M Røpke	17	20
8	(China) Zhang YW (China) Zhao TT	21	21
(Singapore) V Neo (Singapore) F Liu	3	10

Quarterfinals
4	(South Korea) Ha J-e (South Korea) Kim M-j	9	10
8	(China) Zhang YW (China) Zhao TT	21	21

=== Section 3 ===
First round
(Malaysia) Fong CY (Malaysia) Mooi HY
(Switzerland) J Cicognini (Switzerland) S Jaquet	wo
(England) J Wallwork (England) G White	wo
10	(Indonesia) SP Irawati (Indonesia) M Jauhari
(Russia) A Prokopenko (Russia) O Golovanova	14	17
(Hong Kong) Chan HY (Hong Kong) Chau HW	21	21

Second round
(Malaysia) Fong CY (Malaysia) Mooi HY	21	13	18
10	(Indonesia) SP Irawati (Indonesia) M Jauhari	14	21	21
(France) W Rahmawati (France) L Choinet	9	10
6	(China) Ma J (China) Wang XL	21	21
(Hong Kong) Chan HY (Hong Kong) Chau HW	15	14
15	(Singapore) SM Sari (Singapore) Yao L	21	21
(Malaysia) Chong SC (Malaysia) Woon KW	12	11
3	(South Korea) Lee H-j (South Korea) Lee K-w	21	21

Third round
10	(Indonesia) SP Irawati (Indonesia) M Jauhari	16	14
6	(China) Ma J (China) Wang XL	21	21
15	(Singapore) SM Sari (Singapore) Yao L	16	14
3	(South Korea) Lee H-j (South Korea) Lee K-w	21	21

Quarterfinals
6	(China) Ma J (China) Wang XL	21	21
3	(South Korea) Lee H-j (South Korea) Lee K-w	18	13

=== Section 4 ===
First round
(Bulgaria) M Dobreva (Bulgaria) A Spasova	wo
(Thailand) D Aroonkesorn (Thailand) K Voravichitchaikul	wo
(Slovenia) M Tvrdy (Slovenia) S Silvester	wo
(Netherlands) R van Cutsen (Netherlands) P van Dooremalen	wo

Second round
Bye
(Denmark) L Frier Kristiansen (Denmark) K Rytter Juhl
(Wales) R Thomas (Wales) S Thomas	9	3
7	(Chinese Taipei) Cheng W-h (Chinese Taipei) Chien Y-c	21	21
Bye
16	(Japan) M Fujii (Japan) R Kakiiwa
(India) A Balan (India) S Kurian	16	16
2	(China) Cheng S (China) Zhao YL	21	21

Third round
9	(Denmark) L Frier Kristiansen (Denmark) K Rytter Juhl	6	16
7	(Chinese Taipei) Cheng W-h (Chinese Taipei) Chien Y-c	21	21
16	(Japan) M Fujii (Japan) R Kakiiwa	16	18
2	(China) Cheng S (China) Zhao YL	21	21

Quarterfinals
7	(Chinese Taipei) Cheng W-h (Chinese Taipei) Chien Y-c	21	11	8
2	(China) Cheng S (China) Zhao YL	11	21	21

== Final stage ==
Quarter-finals
11	(Japan) Miyuki Maeda (Japan) Satoko Suetsuna	17	8
5	(China) Du Jing (China) Yu Yang	21	21
4	(South Korea) Ha Jung-eun (South Korea) Kim Min-jung	9	10
8	(China) Zhang Yawen (China) Zhao Tingting	21	21
6	(China) Ma Jin (China) Wang Xiaoli	21	21
3	(South Korea) Lee Hyo-jung (South Korea) Lee Kyung-won	18	13
7	(Chinese Taipei) Cheng Wen-hsing (Chinese Taipei) Chien Yu-chin	21	11	8
2	(China) Cheng Shu (China) Zhao Yunlei	11	21	21

Semi-finals
5	(China) Du Jing (China) Yu Yang	22	21	8
8	(China) Zhang Yawen (China) Zhao Tingting	24	18	21
6	(China) Ma Jin (China) Wang Xiaoli	16	12
2	(China) Cheng Shu (China) Zhao Yunlei	21	21

Final
8	(China) Zhang Yawen (China) Zhao Tingting	17	21	21
2	(China) Cheng Shu (China) Zhao Yunlei	21	17	16
