= 2006 Badminton World Cup =

Badminton championships

Tournament details
- Dates: 24–28 October 2006
- Edition: 21st
- Total prize money: US$250,000
- Venue: Olympic Park
- Location: Yiyang, Hunan, China

The 2006 Badminton World Cup was the twenty-first edition of the international Badminton World Cup tournament. The event was held at the Olympic Sports Park in Yiyang, Hunan, China, from 24 to 28 October 2006. It was organized by the Table Tennis and Badminton Administration Center under the General Administration of Sport of China, hosted by the Hunan Sports Bureau and the Yiyang People's Government, and also co-organized by China Mobile Group Hunan Co., Ltd., with a total prize money of US$250,000. Some of top players declined to participate, since there is no ranking points awarded in this tournament, and tight competition schedule at that year, with also held the World Championship, Thomas & Uber Cup, Asian Games, and the European Club League. In the end, the host Chinese national team won the men's singles, women's singles and women's doubles, while the men's and mixed doubles won by Indonesian players.

== Medalists ==
Event	Gold	Silver	Bronze
Men's singles	(China) Lin Dan	(China) Chen Yu	(Indonesia) Taufik Hidayat
Men's singles	(China) Lin Dan	(China) Chen Yu	(China) Chen Jin
Women's singles	(China) Wang Yihan	(China) Xie Xingfang	(China) Zhang Ning
Women's singles	(China) Wang Yihan	(China) Xie Xingfang	(China) Jiang Yanjiao
Men's doubles	(Indonesia) Markis Kido (Indonesia) Hendra Setiawan	(Malaysia) Lin Woon Fui (Malaysia) Fairuzizuan Tazari	(China) Cai Yun (China) Fu Haifeng
Men's doubles	(Indonesia) Markis Kido (Indonesia) Hendra Setiawan	(Malaysia) Lin Woon Fui (Malaysia) Fairuzizuan Tazari	(China) Guo Zhendong (China) Xie Zhongbo
Women's doubles	(China) Gao Ling (China) Huang Sui	(China) Zhang Jiewen (China) Yang Wei	(Chinese Taipei) Chien Yu-chin (Chinese Taipei) Cheng Wen-hsing
Women's doubles	(China) Gao Ling (China) Huang Sui	(China) Zhang Jiewen (China) Yang Wei	(Malaysia) Wong Pei Tty (Malaysia) Chin Eei Hui
Mixed doubles	(Indonesia) Nova Widianto (Indonesia) Liliyana Natsir	(China) Xie Zhongbo (China) Zhang Yawen	(China) Zhang Jun (China) Gao Ling
Mixed doubles	(Indonesia) Nova Widianto (Indonesia) Liliyana Natsir	(China) Xie Zhongbo (China) Zhang Yawen	(China) Zheng Bo (China) Zhao Tingting

== Men's singles ==
=== Group A ===
Rank	Players	Pld	W	L	SF	SA
1	(China) Lin Dan	2	2	0	4	0
2	(Malaysia) Kuan Beng Hong	2	1	1	2	3
3	(New Zealand) John Moody	2	0	2	1	4

	Score		Set 1	Set 2	Set 3
Lin Dan (China)	2–0	(New Zealand) John Moody	21–9	21–14	
Kuan Beng Hong (Malaysia)	2–1	(New Zealand) John Moody	21–19	19–21	21–15
Lin Dan (China)	2–0	(Malaysia) Kuan Beng Hong	21–12	21–8	

=== Group B ===
Rank	Players	Pld	W	L	SF	SA
1	(China) Chen Yu	2	2	0	4	2
2	(China) Bao Chunlai	2	1	1	3	2
3	(Hong Kong) Ng Wei	2	0	2	1	4

	Score		Set 1	Set 2	Set 3
Chen Yu (China)	2–1	(China) Bao Chunlai	21–17	16–21	21–14
Chen Yu (China)	2–1	(Hong Kong) Ng Wei	20–22	21–15	23–21
Bao Chunlai (China)	2–0	(Hong Kong) Ng Wei	21–15	21–12	

=== Group C ===
Rank	Players	Pld	W	L	SF	SA
1	(Indonesia) Taufik Hidayat	2	1	1	3	2
2	(Netherlands) Eric Pang	2	1	1	2	2
3	(China) Chen Hong	2	1	1	2	3

	Score		Set 1	Set 2	Set 3
Eric Pang (Netherlands)	2–0	(China) Chen Hong	21–16	21–19	
Taufik Hidayat (Indonesia)	2–0	(Netherlands) Eric Pang	21–19	21–18	
Chen Hong (China)	2–1	(Indonesia) Taufik Hidayat	21–19	15–21	21–16

=== Group D ===
Rank	Players	Pld	W	L	SF	SA
1	(China) Chen Jin	2	2	0	4	1
2	(England) Andrew Smith	2	1	1	3	2
3	(Malaysia) Yeoh Kay Bin	2	0	2	0	4

	Score		Set 1	Set 2	Set 3
Chen Jin (China)	2–0	(Malaysia) Yeoh Kay Bin	21–8	21–15	
Andrew Smith (England)	2–0	(Malaysia) Yeoh Kay Bin	21–15	24–22	
Chen Jin (China)	2–1	(England) Andrew Smith	19–21	21–9	21–10

=== Finals ===
Semi-finals
(China) Lin Dan	w	/	o
(Indonesia) Taufik Hidayat
(China) Chen Yu	17	21	21
(China) Chen Jin	21	18	11

Final
(China) Lin Dan	21	19	21
(China) Chen Yu	19	21	17

== Women's singles ==
=== Group A ===
Rank	Players	Pld	W	L	SF	SA
1	(China) Zhang Ning	2	2	0	4	0
2	(China) Chen Li	2	1	1	3	2
3	(Malaysia) Julia Wong Pei Xian	2	0	2	1	4

	Score		Set 1	Set 2	Set 3
Zhang Ning (China)	2–0	(China) Chen Li	21–10	21–17	
Chen Li (China)	2–1	(Malaysia) Julia Wong Pei Xian	21–13	19–21	21–15
Zhang Ning (China)	2–0	(Malaysia) Julia Wong Pei Xian	21–12	21–13	

=== Group B ===
Rank	Players	Pld	W	L	SF	SA
1	(China) Jiang Yanjiao	2	2	0	4	0
2	(Hong Kong) Yip Pui Yin	2	1	1	2	2
3	(New Zealand) Rachel Hindley	2	0	2	0	4

	Score		Set 1	Set 2	Set 3
Jiang Yanjiao (China)	2–0	(New Zealand) Rachel Hindley	21–13	21–4	
Yip Pui Yin (Hong Kong)	2–0	(New Zealand) Rachel Hindley	21–12	21–17	
Jiang Yanjiao (China)	2–0	(Hong Kong) Yip Pui Yin	21–12	21–17	

=== Group C ===
Rank	Players	Pld	W	L	SF	SA
1	(China) Wang Yihan	2	2	0	4	0
2	(Netherlands) Yao Jie	2	1	1	2	3
3	(Bulgaria) Petya Nedelcheva	2	0	2	1	4

	Score		Set 1	Set 2	Set 3
Wang Yihan (China)	2–0	(Netherlands) Yao Jie	21–9	21–12	
Wang Yihan (China)	2–0	(Bulgaria) Petya Nedelcheva	21–19	22–20	
Yao Jie (Netherlands)	2–1	(Bulgaria) Petya Nedelcheva	19–21	21–19	21–16

=== Group D ===
Rank	Players	Pld	W	L	SF	SA
1	(China) Xie Xingfang	2	2	0	4	0
2	(China) Wang Lin	2	1	1	2	2
3	(Malaysia) Wong Mew Choo	2	0	2	0	4

	Score		Set 1	Set 2	Set 3
Xie Xingfang (China)	2–1	(China) Wang Lin	21–19	18–21	21–14
Wang Lin (China)	2–0	(Malaysia) Wong Mew Choo	21–19	21–16	
Xie Xingfang (China)	2–0	(Malaysia) Wong Mew Choo	21–19	21–16	

=== Finals ===
Semi-finals
(China) Zhang Ning	19	18
(China) Wang Yihan	21	21
(China) Jiang Yanjiao	21	19	18
(China) Xie Xingfang	16	21	21

Final
(China) Wang Yihan	21	21
(China) Xie Xingfang	18	19

== Men's doubles ==
=== Group A ===
Rank	Players	Pld	W	L	SF	SA
1	(China) Cai Yun (China) Fu Haifeng	3	3	0	6	1
2	(Indonesia) Markis Kido (Indonesia) Hendra Setiawan	3	2	1	5	3
3	(Malaysia) Gan Teik Chai (Malaysia) Mohd Zakry Abdul Latif	3	1	2	3	5
4	(Hong Kong) Albertus Susanto Njoto (Hong Kong) Yohan Hadikusumo Wiratama	3	0	3	1	6

	Score		Set 1	Set 2	Set 3
Cai Yun (China); Fu Haifeng (China)	2–0	(Malaysia) Gan Teik Chai (Malaysia) Mohd Zakry Abdul Latif	21–13	21–13	
Markis Kido (Indonesia); Hendra Setiawan (Indonesia)	2–0	(Hong Kong) Albertus Susanto Njoto (Hong Kong) Yohan Hadikusumo Wiratama	–	–	
Cai Yun (China); Fu Haifeng (China)	2–0	(Hong Kong) Albertus Susanto Njoto (Hong Kong) Yohan Hadikusumo Wiratama	21–10	21–10	
Markis Kido (Indonesia); Hendra Setiawan (Indonesia)	2–1	(Malaysia) Gan Teik Chai (Malaysia) Mohd Zakry Abdul Latif	19–21	21–17	21–7
Cai Yun (China); Fu Haifeng (China)	2–1	(Indonesia) Markis Kido (Indonesia) Hendra Setiawan	12–21	21–14	21–10
Gan Teik Chai (Malaysia); Mohd Zakry Abdul Latif (Malaysia)	2–1	(Hong Kong) Albertus Susanto Njoto (Hong Kong) Yohan Hadikusumo Wiratama	21–12	15–21	21–14

=== Group B ===
Rank	Players	Pld	W	L	SF	SA
1	(China) Guo Zhendong (China) Xie Zhongbo	3	3	0	6	3
2	(Malaysia) Lin Woon Fui (Malaysia) Fairuzizuan Tazari	3	2	1	5	3
3	(Indonesia) Luluk Hadiyanto (Indonesia) Alvent Yulianto	3	1	2	4	4
4	(China) Xia Xuanze (China) Xu Chen	3	0	3	1	6

	Score		Set 1	Set 2	Set 3
Guo Zhendong (China); Xie Zhongbo (China)	2–1	(China) Xia Xuanze (China) Xu Chen	21–14	14–21	21–11
Lin Woon Fui (Malaysia); Fairuzizuan Tazari (Malaysia)	2–1	(Indonesia) Luluk Hadiyanto (Indonesia) Alvent Yulianto	18–21	21–19	21–18
Guo Zhendong (China); Xie Zhongbo (China)	2–1	(Malaysia) Lin Woon Fui (Malaysia) Fairuzizuan Tazari	21–12	18–21	21–10
Luluk Hadiyanto (Indonesia); Alvent Yulianto (Indonesia)	2–0	(China) Xia Xuanze (China) Xu Chen	21–14	21–12	
Guo Zhendong (China); Xie Zhongbo (China)	2–1	(Indonesia) Luluk Hadiyanto (Indonesia) Alvent Yulianto	–	–	–
Lin Woon Fui (Malaysia); Fairuzizuan Tazari (Malaysia)	2–0	(China) Xia Xuanze (China) Xu Chen	21–19	21–14	

=== Finals ===
Semi-finals
(China) Cai Yun (China) Fu Haifeng	15	21	17
(Malaysia) Lin Woon Fui (Malaysia) Fairuzizuan Tazari	21	13	21
(China) Guo Zhendong (China) Xie Zhongbo	19	13
(Indonesia) Markis Kido (Indonesia) Hendra Setiawan	21	21

Final
(Malaysia) Lin Woon Fui (Malaysia) Fairuzizuan Tazari	18	15
(Indonesia) Markis Kido (Indonesia) Hendra Setiawan	21	21

== Women's doubles ==
=== Group A ===
Rank	Players	Pld	W	L	SF	SA
1	(China) Gao Ling (China) Huang Sui	3	3	0	6	0
2	(Malaysia) Chin Eei Hui (Malaysia) Wong Pei Tty	3	2	1	4	3
3	(Indonesia) Jo Novita (Indonesia) Greysia Polii	3	1	2	2	4
4	(Bulgaria) Diana Dimova (Bulgaria) Petya Nedelcheva	3	0	3	1	6

	Score		Set 1	Set 2	Set 3
Gao Ling (China); Huang Sui (China)	2–0	(Indonesia) Jo Novita (Indonesia) Greysia Polii	21–16	21–8	
Chin Eei Hui (Malaysia); Wong Pei Tty (Malaysia)	2–1	(Bulgaria) Diana Dimova (Bulgaria) Petya Nedelcheva	21–13	18–21	21–14
Gao Ling (China); Huang Sui (China)	2–0	(Bulgaria) Diana Dimova (Bulgaria) Petya Nedelcheva	21–4	21–14	
Chin Eei Hui (Malaysia); Wong Pei Tty (Malaysia)	2–0	(Indonesia) Jo Novita (Indonesia) Greysia Polii	21–16	23–21	
Gao Ling (China); Huang Sui (China)	2–0	(Malaysia) Chin Eei Hui (Malaysia) Wong Pei Tty	21–19	21–10	
Jo Novita (Indonesia); Greysia Polii (Indonesia)	2–0	(Bulgaria) Diana Dimova (Bulgaria) Petya Nedelcheva	21–19	21–17	

=== Group B ===
Rank	Players	Pld	W	L	SF	SA
1	(China) Yang Wei (China) Zhang Jiewen	3	3	0	6	0
2	(Chinese Taipei) Cheng Wen-hsing (Chinese Taipei) Chien Yu-chin	3	2	1	4	2
3	(Sweden) Elin Bergblom (Sweden) Johanna Persson	3	1	2	2	5
4	(Indonesia) Meiliana Jauhari (Indonesia) Purwati	3	0	3	1	6

	Score		Set 1	Set 2	Set 3
Yang Wei (China); Zhang Jiewen (China)	2–0	(Indonesia) Meiliana Jauhari (Indonesia) Purwati	21–9	21–7	
Cheng Wen-hsing (Chinese Taipei); Chien Yu-chin (Chinese Taipei)	2–0	(Sweden) Elin Bergblom (Sweden) Johanna Persson	–	–	
Yang Wei (China); Zhang Jiewen (China)	2–0	(Sweden) Elin Bergblom (Sweden) Johanna Persson	21–17	21–8	
Cheng Wen-hsing (Chinese Taipei); Chien Yu-chin (Chinese Taipei)	2–0	(Indonesia) Meiliana Jauhari (Indonesia) Purwati	21–18	21–10	
Yang Wei (China); Zhang Jiewen (China)	2–0	(Chinese Taipei) Cheng Wen-hsing (Chinese Taipei) Chien Yu-chin	21–16	21–18	
Elin Bergblom (Sweden); Johanna Persson (Sweden)	2–1	(Indonesia) Meiliana Jauhari (Indonesia) Purwati	21–18	18–21	21–15

=== Finals ===
Semi-finals
(China) Gao Ling (China) Huang Sui	21	21
(Chinese Taipei) Cheng Wen-hsing (Chinese Taipei) Chien Yu-chin	19	13
(China) Yang Wei (China) Zhang Jiewen	21	21
(Malaysia) Chin Eei Hui (Malaysia) Wong Pei Tty	15	14

Final
(China) Gao Ling (China) Huang Sui	21	21
(China) Yang Wei (China) Zhang Jiewen	19	6

== Mixed doubles ==
=== Group A ===
Rank	Players	Pld	W	L	SF	SA
1	(China) Xie Zhongbo (China) Zhang Yawen	2	2	0	4	2
2	(Indonesia) Nova Widianto (Indonesia) Liliyana Natsir	2	1	1	3	2
3	(Malaysia) Fairuzizuan Tazari (Malaysia) Wong Pei Tty	2	0	2	1	4
N/A	(China) He Hanbin (China) Yu Yang	Retired				

	Score		Set 1	Set 2	Set 3
Xie Zhongbo (China); Zhang Yawen (China)	2–1	~~(China) He Hanbin~~; ~~(China) Yu Yang~~	21–19	18–21	21–17
Nova Widianto (Indonesia); Liliyana Natsir (Indonesia)	2–0	(Malaysia) Fairuzizuan Tazari (Malaysia) Wong Pei Tty	21–18	21–11	
Xie Zhongbo (China); Zhang Yawen (China)	2–1	(Malaysia) Fairuzizuan Tazari (Malaysia) Wong Pei Tty	21–23	21–10	21–16
Nova Widianto (Indonesia); Liliyana Natsir (Indonesia)	1–0^{r}	~~(China) He Hanbin~~; ~~(China) Yu Yang~~	21–9		
Xie Zhongbo (China); Zhang Yawen (China)	2–1	(Indonesia) Nova Widianto (Indonesia) Liliyana Natsir	23–25	21–19	21–19
Fairuzizuan Tazari (Malaysia); Wong Pei Tty (Malaysia)	Walkover	~~(China) He Hanbin~~; ~~(China) Yu Yang~~	Walkover		

=== Group B ===
Rank	Players	Pld	W	L	SF	SA
1	(China) Zhang Jun (China) Gao Ling	3	3	0	6	1
2	(China) Zheng Bo (China) Zhao Tingting	3	2	1	5	2
3	(Philippines) Kennevic Asuncion (Philippines) Kennie Asuncion	3	1	2	2	4
4	(Indonesia) Muhammad Rijal (Indonesia) Greysia Polii	3	0	3	0	6

	Score		Set 1	Set 2	Set 3
Zhang Jun (China); Gao Ling (China)	2–1	(China) Zheng Bo (China) Zhao Tingting	21–16	18–21	21–18
Kennevic Asuncion (Philippines); Kennie Asuncion (Philippines)	2–0	(Indonesia) Muhammad Rijal (Indonesia) Greysia Polii	21–18	30–28	
Zhang Jun (China); Gao Ling (China)	2–0	(Indonesia) Muhammad Rijal (Indonesia) Greysia Polii	21–11	21–18	
Zheng Bo (China); Zhao Tingting (China)	2–0	(Philippines) Kennevic Asuncion (Philippines) Kennie Asuncion	22–20	21–12	
Zhang Jun (China); Gao Ling (China)	2–0	(Philippines) Kennevic Asuncion (Philippines) Kennie Asuncion	21–15	21–16	
Zheng Bo (China); Zhao Tingting (China)	2–0	(Indonesia) Muhammad Rijal (Indonesia) Greysia Polii	21–10	25–23	

=== Finals ===
Semi-finals
(China) Xie Zhongbo (China) Zhang Yawen	21	21
(China) Zheng Bo (China) Zhao Tingting	14	11
(China) Zhang Jun (China) Gao Ling	15	16
(Indonesia) Nova Widianto (Indonesia) Liliyana Natsir	21	21

Final
(China) Xie Zhongbo (China) Zhang Yawen	16	18
(Indonesia) Nova Widianto (Indonesia) Liliyana Natsir	21	21
