= Meiliana Jauhari =

Indonesian badminton player (born 1984)

Personal information
- Born: 7 May 1984 (age 42) Jakarta, Indonesia
- Height: 1.68 m (5 ft 6 in)

Sport
- Country: Indonesia
- Sport: Badminton
- Handedness: Right
- Coached by: Richard Mainaky

Women's doubles
- Highest ranking: 5 (with Greysia Polii 2 May 2011)
- BWF profile
Medal record
Women's badminton
Representing Indonesia
Sudirman Cup
| Bronze medal – third place | 2009 Guangzhou | Mixed team |
| Bronze medal – third place | 2011 Qingdao | Mixed team |
Uber Cup
| Bronze medal – third place | 2010 Kuala Lumpur | Women's team |
Asian Games
| Bronze medal – third place | 2010 Guangzhou | Women's team |
SEA Games
| Silver medal – second place | 2009 Vientiane | Women's team |
| Bronze medal – third place | 2009 Vientiane | Women's doubles |
World Junior Championships
| Bronze medal – third place | 2002 Pretoria | Mixed team |

Meiliana Jauhari (born 7 May 1984) is a badminton player from Indonesia. She won the women's doubles title at the 2009 and 2013 Indonesian National Championships. Jauhari participated at the 2010 Asian Games and 2012 Summer Olympics.

== Career ==
Jauhari trained at the Djarum badminton club, and has joined the club since 2002.

Jauhari competed in the women's doubles in the BWF Super Series at the 2008 Indonesia Super Series, the 2009 Malaysia Super Series, and the 2009 Korea Open Super Series with her partner, Shendy Puspa Irawati. She won a BWF Grand Prix title at the 2008 Vietnam Open.

Partnered with Greysia Polii in the women's doubles, surprisingly, the first time they played together, they beat Korean pair Ha Jung-eun and Lee Kyung-won, 21–14, 21–12. At the 2010 All England Super Series, they reached the quarterfinals after defeating 4th-seeded Malaysian pair Chin Eei Hui and Wong Pei Tty in straight sets. In the quarterfinals, they played a rubber set against Pan Pan and Tian Qing from China but lost 23–25, 21–17, 17–21. They played at the Uber Cup but they lost to Ma Jin and Wang Xiaoli of China in the semifinals. They were the runners-up of the 2010 Macau Open Grand Prix Gold after losing to Cheng Wen-hsing and Chien Yu-chin of Chinese Taipei in the rubber games.

At the 2012 Summer Olympics, Jauhari and her partner Polii, along with Jung Kyung-eun and Kim Ha-na, Ha Jung-eun and Kim Min-jung of South Korea, and Wang Xiaoli and Yu Yang of China were disqualified from the competition for "not using one's best efforts to win a match" and "conducting oneself in a manner that is clearly abusive or detrimental to the sport" following matches the previous evening during which they were accused of trying to lose in order to manipulate the draw. Jauhari and her partner Greysia Polii played against South Korea's Ha Jung-eun and Kim Min-jung. Indonesia filed an appeal to the case, but it was withdrawn.

== Achievements ==
=== SEA Games ===
Women's doubles
| Year | Venue | Partner | Opponent | Score | Result |
|---|---|---|---|---|---|
| 2009 | Gym Hall 1, National Sports Complex, Vientiane, Laos | (Indonesia) Shendy Puspa Irawati | (Malaysia) Chin Eei Hui (Malaysia) Wong Pei Tty | 12–21, 15–21 | Bronze |

=== BWF Grand Prix (2 titles, 8 runners-up) ===
The BWF Grand Prix had two levels, the Grand Prix and Grand Prix Gold. It was a series of badminton tournaments sanctioned by the Badminton World Federation (BWF) and played between 2007 and 2017. The World Badminton Grand Prix has been sanctioned by the International Badminton Federation from 1983 to 2006.

Women's doubles
| Year | Tournament | Partner | Opponent | Score | Result |
|---|---|---|---|---|---|
| 2006 | Bulgarian Open | (Indonesia) Purwati | (Russia) Valeria Sorokina (Russia) Nina Vislova | 21–10, 21–9 | (gold) Winner |
| 2007 | New Zealand Open | (Indonesia) Shendy Puspa Irawati | (Japan) Ikue Tatani (Japan) Aya Wakisaka | 17–21, 21–15, 16–21 | (silver) Runner-up |
| 2008 | Bitburger Open | (Indonesia) Shendy Puspa Irawati | (Denmark) Helle Nielsen (Denmark) Marie Roepke | 15–21, 18–21 | (silver) Runner-up |
| 2008 | Bulgarian Open | (Indonesia) Shendy Puspa Irawati | (India) Jwala Gutta (India) Shruti Kurian | 11–21, 19–21 | (silver) Runner-up |
| 2008 | Dutch Open | (Indonesia) Shendy Puspa Irawati | (Denmark) Lena Frier Kristiansen (Denmark) Kamilla Rytter Juhl | 16–21, 23–25 | (silver) Runner-up |
| 2008 | Vietnam Open | (Indonesia) Shendy Puspa Irawati | (Singapore) Shinta Mulia Sari (Singapore) Yao Lei | 21–16, 19–21, 21–11 | (gold) Winner |
| 2009 | Philippines Open | (Indonesia) Shendy Puspa Irawati | (China) Gao Ling (China) Wei Yili | 11–21, 11–21 | (silver) Runner-up |
| 2010 | Macau Open | (Indonesia) Greysia Polii | (Chinese Taipei) Cheng Wen-hsing (Chinese Taipei) Chien Yu-chin | 21–16, 18–21, 16–21 | (silver) Runner-up |
| 2010 | Indonesia Grand Prix Gold | (Indonesia) Greysia Polii | (China) Luo Ying (China) Luo Yu | 21–11, 18–21, 11–21 | (silver) Runner-up |
| 2011 | Chinese Taipei Open | (Indonesia) Greysia Polii | (South Korea) Ha Jung-eun (South Korea) Kim Min-jung | 21–14, 18–21, 0–2 retired | (silver) Runner-up |

BWF Grand Prix Gold tournament
BWF Grand Prix tournament

=== BWF International Challenge/Series (11 titles, 6 runners-up) ===
Women's doubles
| Year | Tournament | Partner | Opponent | Score | Result |
|---|---|---|---|---|---|
| 2005 | Jakarta Satellite | (Indonesia) Purwati | (Indonesia) Rani Mundiasti (Indonesia) Apriliana Rintan | 15–7, 12–15, 3–15 | (silver) Runner-up |
| 2005 | Malaysia Satellite | (Indonesia) Purwati | (South Korea) Kang Joo-young (South Korea) Lee Seul-gi | 15–6, 11–15, 15–6 | (gold) Winner |
| 2006 | Jakarta Satellite | (Indonesia) Purwati | (Indonesia) Nitya Krishinda Maheswari (Indonesia) Nadya Melati | 14–21, 17–21 | (silver) Runner-up |
| 2006 | Surabaya Satellite | (Indonesia) Purwati | (Indonesia) Nitya Krishinda Maheswari (Indonesia) Nadya Melati | 21–16, 21–18 | (gold) Winner |
| 2006 | Brazil International | (Indonesia) Purwati | (Canada) Valerie Loker (Canada) Sarah McMaster | 21–8, 21–8 | (gold) Winner |
| 2007 | Bahrain Satellite | (Indonesia) Shendy Puspa Irawati | (Malaysia) Chor Hooi Yee (Malaysia) Wong Wai See | 21–13, 21–14 | (gold) Winner |
| 2007 | Indonesia International | (Indonesia) Shendy Puspa Irawati | (Japan) Yasuyo Imabeppu (Japan) Shizuka Matsuo | 15–21, 21–15, 21–17 | (gold) Winner |
| 2008 | Polish Open | (Indonesia) Shendy Puspa Irawati | (Sweden) Elin Bergblom (Sweden) Johanna Persson | 21–11, 21–19 | (gold) Winner |
| 2008 | Spanish Open | (Indonesia) Shendy Puspa Irawati | (Scotland) Jillie Cooper (Belgium) Nathalie Descamps | 21–10, 21–10 | (gold) Winner |
| 2008 | Le Volant d'Or de Toulouse | (Indonesia) Shendy Puspa Irawati | (Netherlands) Rachel van Cutsen (Netherlands) Paulien van Dooremalen | 21–15, 21–10 | (gold) Winner |
| 2008 | Indonesia International | (Indonesia) Shendy Puspa Irawati | (Singapore) Shinta Mulia Sari (Singapore) Yao Lei | 21–14, 21–18 | (gold) Winner |
| 2014 | USM Indonesia International | (Indonesia) Komala Dewi | (Indonesia) Dian Fitriani (Indonesia) Nadya Melati | 21–14, 12–21, 17–21 | (silver) Runner-up |
| 2014 | Swiss International | (Indonesia) Aprilsasi Putri Lejarsar Variella | (Bulgaria) Gabriela Stoeva (Bulgaria) Stefani Stoeva | 6–11, 5–11, 9–11 | (silver) Runner-up |

Mixed doubles
| Year | Tournament | Partner | Opponent | Score | Result |
|---|---|---|---|---|---|
| 2006 | Brazil International | (Indonesia) Danny Bawa Chrisnanta | (Indonesia) Afiat Yuris Wirawan (Indonesia) Purwati | Walkover | (silver) Runner-up |
| 2007 | Bahrain Satellite | (Indonesia) David Pohan | (Portugal) Alexandre Paixão (Portugal) Filipa Lamy | 19–21, 21–14, 21–14 | (gold) Winner |
| 2008 | Spanish Open | (Indonesia) Rendra Wijaya | (Belgium) Wouter Claes (Belgium) Nathalie Descamps | 21–14, 21–18 | (gold) Winner |
| 2008 | Le Volant d'Or de Toulouse | (Indonesia) Rendra Wijaya | (Indonesia) Fran Kurniawan (Indonesia) Shendy Puspa Irawati | 18–21, 21–18, 14–21 | (silver) Runner-up |

BWF International Challenge tournament
BWF International Series tournament

== Performance timeline ==
=== National team ===
- Senior level

| Team events | 2009 |
|---|---|
| SEA Games | Silver |

| Team events | 2010 |
|---|---|
| Asian Games | Bronze |

| Team events | 2010 |
|---|---|
| Uber Cup | Bronze |

| Team events | 2011 |
|---|---|
| Sudirman Cup | Bronze |

=== Individual competitions ===
- Senior level

| Event | 2009 |
|---|---|
| SEA Games | Bronze |

| Event | 2009 | 2010 | 2011 |
|---|---|---|---|
| World Championships | R3 | A | QF |

| Event | 2012 |
|---|---|
| Olympic Games | DSQ |

| Tournament | BWF Superseries | | | | Best |
| Tournament | 2007 | 2008 | 2009 | 2010 | Best |
|---|---|---|---|---|---|
| BWF Super Series Finals | —N/a | NQ | | RR | RR (2010) |

| Tournament | IBF Grand Prix | BWF Grand Prix and Grand Prix Gold | | | | | | | | Best |
| Tournament | 2006 | 2007 | 2008 | 2009 | 2010 | 2011 | 2012 | 2013 | 2014 | Best |
|---|---|---|---|---|---|---|---|---|---|---|
| New Zealand Open | | F | | | —N/a | | —N/a | A | | F (2007) |
| Philippines Open | | | —N/a | F | —N/a | | | | | F (2009) |
| Chinese Taipei Open | | R1 | | | QF | F | A | R2 | A | F (2011) |
| Vietnam Open | A | QF (WD); QF (XD) | W (WD) | A | | | | QF | R1 (WD); R1 (XD) | W (2008) |
| Dutch Open | | | F | A | | | | | R2 | F (2008) |
| Bitburger Open | | | F | | | | A | | QF | F (2008) |
| Bulgaria Open | W | —N/a | F | —N/a | | | IS | | | W (2006) |
| Macau Open | A | | | A | F | | R1 | A | | F (2010) |
| Indonesian Masters | —N/a | | | | F | w/d | A | R1 | R2 (WD); R1 (XD) | F (2010) |
