= 2009 BWF Super Series Masters Finals =

Tournament details
- Dates: 2 December 2009 - 6 December 2009
- Total prize money: US$500,000
- Venue: Stadium Tertutup Bandaraya Johor Bahru
- Location: Johor Bahru, Malaysia

Champions
- Men's singles: (Malaysia) Lee Chong Wei
- Women's singles: (Malaysia) Wong Mew Choo
- Men's doubles: (South Korea) Jung Jae-sung (South Korea) Lee Yong-dae
- Women's doubles: (Malaysia) Wong Pei Tty (Malaysia) Chin Eei Hui
- Mixed doubles: (Denmark) Joachim Fischer Nielsen (Denmark) Christinna Pedersen

The 2009 BWF Super Series Masters Finals was a top level badminton competition which was held from December 2 to December 6, 2009, in Johor Bahru, Malaysia. The final was held by Badminton Association of Malaysia. It was the final event of the BWF Super Series competition on the 2009 BWF Super Series schedule. The total purse for the event was $500,000.

== Representatives by nation ==
Top Nations
Rank	Nation	MS	WS	MD	WD	XD	Total	Players
1	Thailand	1	2	0	1	2	6	8^{§}
2	Denmark	2	0	1	1	1	5	8
2	Malaysia	1	1	2	1	0	5	8
4	Indonesia	1	0	2	0	1	4	6^{§}
5	Chinese Taipei	1	0	0	2	0	3	5
5	England	0	0	1	1	1	3	5^{§}
5	South Korea	1	0	1	0	1	3	5
8	Germany	0	2	0	0.5	0	2.5	2^{§}
9	China	1	0	1	0	0	2	3
9	India	0	1	0	0	1	2	3
11	Canada	0	1	0	0.5	0	1.5	1^{§}
12	France	0	0	0	1	0	1	2
12	Poland	0	0	0	0	1	1	2
14	Netherlands	0	1	0	0	0	1	1
Total		8	8	8	8	8	40	59

§: Nicole Grether from Germany and Charmaine Reid from Canada were the players who played in two categories (women's singles and women's doubles), Anthony Clark from England and Hendra Aprida Gunawan from Indonesia were the players who played in two categories (men's doubles and mixed doubles), while Kunchala Voravichitchaikul from Thailand was the only player who played in two categories (women's doubles and mixed doubles).

== Performance by nation ==
Nation	Group Phase	Semifinal	Final	Winner
China	2	2		
Thailand	6	1		
Denmark	5	4	3	1
Malaysia	5	4	3	3
Indonesia	4			
South Korea	3	2	2	1
Chinese Taipei	3	1		
Germany	2.5	1	1	
India	2	2	1	
Netherlands	1	1		
England	3	1		
France	1			
Canada	1.5			
Poland	1	1		

== Men's singles ==
=== Group A ===
Athlete	Pts	Pld	W	L	SF	SA	PF	PA
(Malaysia) Lee Chong Wei	3	3	3	0	6	0	126	66
(China) Bao Chunlai	2	3	2	1	4	3	130	129
(Chinese Taipei) Hsieh Yu-hsing	1	3	1	2	3	4	110	133
(Indonesia) Taufik Hidayat	0	3	0	3	0	6	93	131

Date		Score		Set 1	Set 2	Set 3
2 Dec	(China) Bao Chunlai	2–0	(Indonesia) Taufik Hidayat	21-18	26-24	
2 Dec	(Malaysia) Lee Chong Wei	2–0	(Chinese Taipei) Hsieh Yu-hsing	21-11	21-12	
3 Dec	(Malaysia) Lee Chong Wei	2–0	(Indonesia) Taufik Hidayat	21–6	21-13	
3 Dec	(China) Bao Chunlai	2–1	(Chinese Taipei) Hsieh Yu-hsing	17-21	21-8	21-16
4 Dec	(Malaysia) Lee Chong Wei	2-0	(China) Bao Chunlai	21-13	21-11	
4 Dec	(Chinese Taipei) Hsieh Yu-hsing	2-0	(Indonesia) Taufik Hidayat	21-17	21-15	

=== Group B ===
Athlete	Pts	Pld	W	L	SF	SA	PF	PA
(South Korea) Park Sung-hwan	2	3	2	1	4	3	130	134
(Denmark) Peter Gade	2	3	2	1	5	3	156	126
(Thailand) Boonsak Ponsana	1	3	1	2	3	4	136	138
(Denmark) Jan Ø. Jørgensen	1	3	1	2	2	4	96	116

Date		Score		Set 1	Set 2	Set 3
2 Dec	(Denmark) Peter Gade	2–0	(Denmark) Jan Ø. Jørgensen	21-12	21-15	
2 Dec	(South Korea) Park Sung-hwan	2–0	(Thailand) Boonsak Ponsana	28-26	21-18	
3 Dec	(South Korea) Park Sung-hwan	2–1	(Denmark) Peter Gade	21-12	7-21	21-15
3 Dec	(Thailand) Boonsak Ponsana	2–0	(Denmark) Jan Ø. Jørgensen	21-9	21-18	
4 Dec	(Denmark) Jan Ø. Jørgensen	2–0	(South Korea) Park Sung-hwan	21-19	21-13	
4 Dec	(Denmark) Peter Gade	2–1	(Thailand) Boonsak Ponsana	21-13	20-22	21-15

=== Finals ===
Semifinals
(Malaysia) Lee Chong Wei	21	21
(Denmark) Peter Gade	17	16
(China) Bao Chunlai	14	14
(South Korea) Park Sung-hwan	21	21

Final
(Malaysia) Lee Chong Wei	21	21
(South Korea) Park Sung-hwan	17	17

== Women's singles ==
=== Group A ===
Athlete	Pts	Pld	W	L	SF	SA	PF	PA
(Malaysia) Wong Mew Choo	3	3	3	0	6	1	139	183
(India) Saina Nehwal	2	3	2	1	5	2	132	110
(Thailand) Porntip Buranaprasertsuk	1	3	1	2	2	4	90	109
(Canada) Charmaine Reid	0	3	0	3	0	6	67	126

Date		Score		Set 1	Set 2	Set 3
2 Dec	(Thailand) Porntip Buranaprasertsuk	2–0	(Canada) Charmaine Reid	21-13	21-12	
2 Dec	(Malaysia) Wong Mew Choo	2–1	(India) Saina Nehwal	21-13	13-21	21-14
3 Dec	(India) Saina Nehwal	2–0	(Canada) Charmaine Reid	21-14	21–9	
3 Dec	(Malaysia) Wong Mew Choo	2–0	(Thailand) Porntip Buranaprasertsuk	21-9	21–7	
4 Dec	(India) Saina Nehwal	2–0	(Thailand) Porntip Buranaprasertsuk	21–13	21–19	
4 Dec	(Malaysia) Wong Mew Choo	2–0	(Canada) Charmaine Reid	21-6	21-13	

=== Group B ===
Athlete	Pts	Pld	W	L	SF	SA	PF	PA
(Germany) Juliane Schenk	2	3	2	1	5	2	146	108
(Netherlands) Yao Jie	2	3	2	1	4	2	107	100
(Thailand) Salakjit Ponsana	2	3	2	1	4	3	121	128
(Germany) Nicole Grether	0	3	0	3	0	6	88	126

Date		Score		Set 1	Set 2	Set 3
2 Dec	(Netherlands) Yao Jie	2–0	(Thailand) Salakjit Ponsana	21-14	21-11	
2 Dec	(Germany) Juliane Schenk	2–0	(Germany) Nicole Grether	21-17	21-14	
3 Dec	(Thailand) Salakjit Ponsana	2–0	(Germany) Nicole Grether	21-17	21-7	
3 Dec	(Germany) Juliane Schenk	2–0	(Netherlands) Yao Jie	21-13	21-10	
4 Dec	(Netherlands) Yao Jie	2–0	(Germany) Nicole Grether	21-18	21-15	
4 Dec	(Thailand) Salakjit Ponsana	2–1	(Germany) Juliane Schenk	22-20	9-21	23-21

=== Finals ===
Semifinals
(Malaysia) Wong Mew Choo	21	21
(Netherlands) Yao Jie	10	10
(India) Saina Nehwal	18	18
(Germany) Juliane Schenk	21	21

Final
(Malaysia) Wong Mew Choo	21	21
(Germany) Juliane Schenk	15	7

== Men's doubles ==
=== Group A ===
Athlete	Pts	Pld	W	L	SF	SA	PF	PA
(China) Xu Chen (China) Guo Zhendong	3	3	3	0	6	1	148	119
(Malaysia) Mohd Zakry Abdul Latif (Malaysia) Mohd Fairuzizuan Mohd Tazari	2	3	2	1	4	2	119	100
(Malaysia) Koo Kien Keat (Malaysia) Tan Boon Heong	1	3	1	2	3	4	114	129
(Indonesia) Rian Sukmawan (Indonesia) Yonathan Suryatama Dasuki	0	3	0	3	0	6	99	132

Date		Score		Set 1	Set 2	Set 3
2 Dec	(China) Xu Chen (China) Guo Zhendong	2-0	(Indonesia) Rian Sukmawan (Indonesia) Yonathan Suryatama Dasuki	26–24	22–20	
2 Dec	(Malaysia) Mohd Zakry Abdul Latif (Malaysia) Mohd Fairuzizuan Mohd Tazari	2–0	(Malaysia) Koo Kien Keat (Malaysia) Tan Boon Heong	21–15	21–17	
3 Dec	(Malaysia) Koo Kien Keat (Malaysia) Tan Boon Heong	2–0	(Indonesia) Rian Sukmawan (Indonesia) Yonathan Suryatama Dasuki	21-15	21-14	
3 Dec	(China) Xu Chen (China) Guo Zhendong	2–0	(Malaysia) Mohd Zakry Abdul Latif (Malaysia) Mohd Fairuzizuan Mohd Tazari	21-18	21-17	
4 Dec	(China) Xu Chen (China) Guo Zhendong	2-1	(Malaysia) Koo Kien Keat (Malaysia) Tan Boon Heong	21-7	16-21	21-12
4 Dec	(Malaysia) Mohd Zakry Abdul Latif (Malaysia) Mohd Fairuzizuan Mohd Tazari	2-0	(Indonesia) Rian Sukmawan (Indonesia) Yonathan Suryatama Dasuki	21-13	21-13	

=== Group B ===
Athlete	Pts	Pld	W	L	SF	SA	PF	PA
(South Korea) Jung Jae-sung (South Korea) Lee Yong-dae	3	3	3	0	6	0	126	101
(Denmark) Mathias Boe (Denmark) Carsten Mogensen	2	3	2	1	4	3	134	125
(Indonesia) Alvent Yulianto (Indonesia) Hendra Aprida Gunawan	1	3	1	2	2	4	114	118
(England) Anthony Clark (England) Nathan Robertson	0	3	0	3	1	6	114	144

Date		Score		Set 1	Set 2	Set 3
2 Dec	(South Korea) Jung Jae-sung (South Korea) Lee Yong-dae	2–0	(England) Anthony Clark (England) Nathan Robertson	21-18	21–13	
2 Dec	(Denmark) Mathias Boe (Denmark) Carsten Mogensen	2–0	(Indonesia) Alvent Yulianto (Indonesia) Hendra Aprida Gunawan	21–16	21-18	
3 Dec	(Denmark) Mathias Boe (Denmark) Carsten Mogensen	2–1	(England) Anthony Clark (England) Nathan Robertson	21-15	18-21	21-13
3 Dec	(South Korea) Jung Jae-sung (South Korea) Lee Yong-dae	2–0	(Indonesia) Alvent Yulianto (Indonesia) Hendra Aprida Gunawan	21-16	21–16	
4 Dec	(South Korea) Jung Jae-sung (South Korea) Lee Yong-dae	2–0	(Denmark) Mathias Boe (Denmark) Carsten Mogensen	21-16	21-16	
4 Dec	(Indonesia) Alvent Yulianto (Indonesia) Hendra Aprida Gunawan	2–0	(England) Anthony Clark (England) Nathan Robertson	21–16	21–18	

=== Finals ===
Semifinals
(China) Xu Chen (China) Guo Zhendong	19	17
(Denmark) Mathias Boe (Denmark) Carsten Mogensen	21	21
(Malaysia) Mohd Zakry Abdul Latif (Malaysia) Mohd Fairuzizuan Mohd Tazari	14	11
(South Korea) Jung Jae-sung (South Korea) Lee Yong-dae	21	21

Final
(Denmark) Mathias Boe (Denmark) Carsten Mogensen	15	15
(South Korea) Jung Jae-sung (South Korea) Lee Yong-dae	21	21

== Women's doubles ==
=== Group A ===
Athlete	Pts	Pld	W	L	SF	SA	PF	PA
(Malaysia) Chin Eei Hui (Malaysia) Wong Pei Tty	3	3	3	0	6	0	126	86
(Denmark) Kamilla Rytter Juhl (Denmark) Lena Frier Kristiansen	2	3	2	1	4	3	134	105
(Canada) Charmaine Reid (Germany) Nicole Grether	1	3	1	2	2	4	81	114
(England) Jenny Wallwork (England) Gabrielle White	0	3	0	3	1	6	106	142

Date		Score		Set 1	Set 2	Set 3
2 Dec	(Denmark) Kamilla Rytter Juhl (Denmark) Lena Frier Kristiansen	2–1	(England) Jenny Wallwork (England) Gabrielle White	16-21	21-16	21-9
2 Dec	(Malaysia) Chin Eei Hui (Malaysia) Wong Pei Tty	2–0	(Canada) Charmaine Reid (Germany) Nicole Grether	21–11	21–11	
3 Dec	(Malaysia) Chin Eei Hui (Malaysia) Wong Pei Tty	2–0	(Denmark) Kamilla Rytter Juhl (Denmark) Lena Frier Kristiansen	21-19	21-15	
3 Dec	(Canada) Charmaine Reid (Germany) Nicole Grether	2–0	(England) Jenny Wallwork (England) Gabrielle White	21–17	21–13	
4 Dec	(Malaysia) Chin Eei Hui (Malaysia) Wong Pei Tty	2–0	(England) Jenny Wallwork (England) Gabrielle White	21–17	21–13	
4 Dec	(Denmark) Kamilla Rytter Juhl (Denmark) Lena Frier Kristiansen	2–0	(Canada) Charmaine Reid (Germany) Nicole Grether	21–10	21–7	

=== Group B ===
Athlete	Pts	Pld	W	L	SF	SA	PF	PA
(Chinese Taipei) Cheng Wen-hsing (Chinese Taipei) Chien Yu-chin	3	3	3	0	6	0	126	67
(Thailand) Duanganong Aroonkesorn (Thailand) Kunchala Voravichitchaikul	2	3	2	1	4	3	126	131
(France) Laura Choinet (France) Weny Rahmawati	1	3	1	2	2	5	117	144
(Chinese Taipei) Chou Chia-chi (Chinese Taipei) Chang Hsin-yun	0	3	0	3	2	6	135	162

Date		Score		Set 1	Set 2	Set 3
2 Dec	(Chinese Taipei) Cheng Wen-hsing (Chinese Taipei) Chien Yu-chin	2–0	(Chinese Taipei) Chou Chia-chi (Chinese Taipei) Chang Hsin-yun	21-12	21-6	
2 Dec	(Thailand) Duanganong Aroonkesorn (Thailand) Kunchala Voravichitchaikul	2-0	(France) Laura Choinet (France) Weny Rahmawati	21-19	21-13	
3 Dec	(Thailand) Duanganong Aroonkesorn (Thailand) Kunchala Voravichitchaikul	2–0	(Chinese Taipei) Chou Chia-chi (Chinese Taipei) Chang Hsin-yun	18-21	21-16	22-20
3 Dec	(Chinese Taipei) Cheng Wen-hsing (Chinese Taipei) Chien Yu-chin	2–0	(France) Laura Choinet (France) Weny Rahmawati	21–9	21–17	
4 Dec	(Chinese Taipei) Cheng Wen-hsing (Chinese Taipei) Chien Yu-chin	2-0	(Thailand) Duanganong Aroonkesorn (Thailand) Kunchala Voravichitchaikul	21-10	21-13	
4 Dec	(France) Laura Choinet (France) Weny Rahmawati	2-1	(Chinese Taipei) Chou Chia-chi (Chinese Taipei) Chang Hsin-yun	15-21	23-21	21-18

=== Finals ===
Semifinals
(Malaysia) Chin Eei Hui (Malaysia) Wong Pei Tty	21	21
(Thailand) Duanganong Aroonkesorn (Thailand) Kunchala Voravichitchaikul	15	18
(Denmark) Kamilla Rytter Juhl (Denmark) Lena Frier Kristiansen	21	10	21
(Chinese Taipei) Cheng Wen-hsing (Chinese Taipei) Chien Yu-chin	17	21	16

Final
(Malaysia) Chin Eei Hui (Malaysia) Wong Pei Tty	21	21
(Denmark) Kamilla Rytter Juhl (Denmark) Lena Frier Kristiansen	17	14

== Mixed doubles ==
=== Group A ===
Athlete	Pts	Pld	W	L	SF	SA	PF	PA
(Poland) Robert Mateusiak (Poland) Nadieżda Kostiuczyk	3	3	3	0	6	0	127	98
(Denmark) Joachim Fischer Nielsen (Denmark) Christinna Pedersen	2	3	2	1	4	3	140	130
(Thailand) Sudket Prapakamol (Thailand) Saralee Thoungthongkam	1	3	1	2	3	4	126	136
(South Korea) Ko Sung-hyun (South Korea) Ha Jung-eun	0	3	0	3	0	6	98	127

Date		Score		Set 1	Set 2	Set 3
2 Dec	(Thailand) Sudket Prapakamol (Thailand) Saralee Thoungthongkam	2–0	(South Korea) Ko Sung-hyun (South Korea) Ha Jung-eun	21-14	21-19	
2 Dec	(Poland) Robert Mateusiak (Poland) Nadieżda Kostiuczyk	2-0	(Denmark) Joachim Fischer Nielsen (Denmark) Christinna Pedersen	21-19	21-18	
3 Dec	(Denmark) Joachim Fischer Nielsen (Denmark) Christinna Pedersen	2–1	(Thailand) Sudket Prapakamol (Thailand) Saralee Thoungthongkam	19-21	21-18	21-17
3 Dec	(Poland) Robert Mateusiak (Poland) Nadieżda Kostiuczyk	2–0	(South Korea) Ko Sung-hyun (South Korea) Ha Jung-eun	22-20	21–13	
4 Dec	(Denmark) Joachim Fischer Nielsen (Denmark) Christinna Pedersen	2-0	(South Korea) Ko Sung-hyun (South Korea) Ha Jung-eun	21-17	21-15	
4 Dec	(Poland) Robert Mateusiak (Poland) Nadieżda Kostiuczyk	2-0	(Thailand) Sudket Prapakamol (Thailand) Saralee Thoungthongkam	21-12	21-16	

=== Group B ===
Athlete	Pts	Pld	W	L	SF	SA	PF	PA
(England) Anthony Clark (England) Donna Kellogg	3	3	3	0	6	2	160	131
(India) V Diju (India) Jwala Gutta	2	3	2	1	4	2	115	97
(Indonesia) Hendra Aprida Gunawan (Indonesia) Vita Marissa	1	3	1	2	3	4	128	127
(Thailand) Songphon Anugritayawon (Thailand) Kunchala Voravichitchaikul	0	3	0	3	1	6	96	144

Date		Score		Set 1	Set 2	Set 3
2 Dec	(England) Anthony Clark (England) Donna Kellogg	2–0	(India) V Diju (India) Jwala Gutta	21-15	21-16	
2 Dec	(Indonesia) Hendra Aprida Gunawan (Indonesia) Vita Marissa	2–0	(Thailand) Songphon Anugritayawon (Thailand) Kunchala Voravichitchaikul	21-14	21-13	
3 Dec	(England) Anthony Clark (England) Donna Kellogg	2–1	(Thailand) Songphon Anugritayawon (Thailand) Kunchala Voravichitchaikul	18-21	21-16	21-12
3 Dec	(India) V Diju (India) Jwala Gutta	2–0	(Indonesia) Hendra Aprida Gunawan (Indonesia) Vita Marissa	21-18	21-17	
4 Dec	(India) V Diju (India) Jwala Gutta	2–0	(Thailand) Songphon Anugritayawon (Thailand) Kunchala Voravichitchaikul	21–12	21–8	
4 Dec	(England) Anthony Clark (England) Donna Kellogg	2–1	(Indonesia) Hendra Aprida Gunawan (Indonesia) Vita Marissa	21-15	16-21	21-15

=== Finals ===
Semifinals
(Poland) Robert Mateusiak (Poland) Nadieżda Kostiuczyk	19	11
(India) V Diju (India) Jwala Gutta	21	21
(Denmark) Joachim Fischer Nielsen (Denmark) Christinna Pedersen	21	21
(England) Anthony Clark (England) Donna Kellogg	13	17

Final
(India) V Diju (India) Jwala Gutta	14	18
(Denmark) Joachim Fischer Nielsen (Denmark) Christinna Pedersen	21	21
