= 2005 Indonesia Open (badminton) =

Badminton championships

Tournament details
- Dates: 19 September 2005 – 25 September 2005
- Edition: 24th
- Level: World Grand Prix 6 Stars
- Total prize money: US$250,000
- Venue: Istora Gelora Bung Karno
- Location: Jakarta, Indonesia

Champions
- Men's singles: (South Korea) Lee Hyun-il
- Women's singles: (Hong Kong) Wang Chen
- Men's doubles: (Indonesia) Markis Kido (Indonesia) Hendra Setiawan
- Women's doubles: (South Korea) Lee Hyo-jung (South Korea) Lee Kyung-won
- Mixed doubles: (Indonesia) Nova Widianto (Indonesia) Liliyana Natsir

The 2005 Indonesia Open (officially known as the Djarum Indonesia Open 2005 for sponsorship reasons) was a six-star World Grand Prix badminton tournament that was held in Jakarta, from September 19 to September 25, 2005, with a total prize money of US$250,000. It was the 24th edition of the Indonesia Open.

== Final results ==
Category	Winners	Runners-up	Score
Men's singles	(South Korea) Lee Hyun-il	(Thailand) Boonsak Ponsana	15–10, 15–3
Women's singles	(Hong Kong) Wang Chen	(Netherlands) Mia Audina	11–7, 11–1
Men's doubles	(Indonesia) Markis Kido & Hendra Setiawan	(Indonesia) Sigit Budiarto & Candra Wijaya	15–10, 12–15, 15–3
Women's doubles	(South Korea) Lee Hyo-jung & Lee Kyung-won	(Malaysia) Chin Eei Hui & Wong Pei Tty	15–4, 15–5
Mixed doubles	(Indonesia) Nova Widianto & Liliyana Natsir	(Indonesia) Anggun Nugroho & Yunita Tetty	15–13, 15–1
