= Rani Mundiasti =

Indonesian badminton player (born 1984)

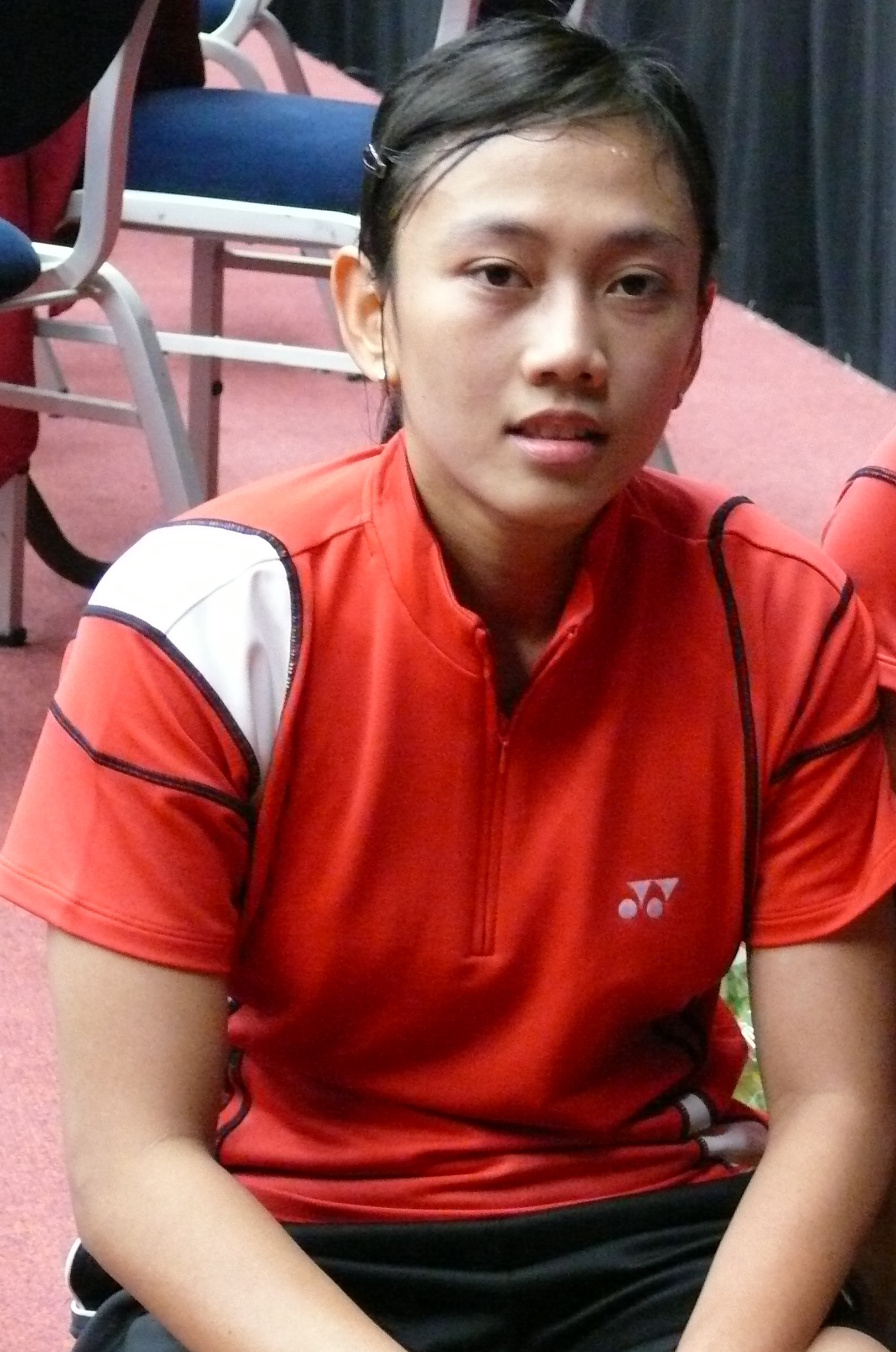

Personal information
- Born: 4 October 1984 (age 42) Jakarta, Indonesia
- Height: 1.62 m (5 ft 4 in)
- Weight: 56 kg (123 lb)

Sport
- Country: Indonesia
- Sport: Badminton
- Handedness: Right
- Event: Women's doubles

Women's doubles
- BWF profile
Medal record
Women's badminton
Representing Indonesia
Sudirman Cup
Silver medal – second place	2007 Glasgow	Mixed team
SEA Games
Gold medal – first place	2007 Nakhon Ratchasima	Women's team
World Junior Championships
Bronze medal – third place	2000 Guangzhou	Mixed team
Asian Junior Championships
Bronze medal – third place	2001 Taipei	Girls' team

Rani Mundiasti (born 4 October 1984) is an Indonesian badminton player.

== Career ==
Mundiasti won the women's doubles at the 2006 Dutch Open with Endang Nursugianti. In 2008, Mundiasti was runner-up in the women's doubles with Jo Novita at the Denmark Super Series, losing to the Malaysian pair of Chin Eei Hui and Wong Pei Tty in the final. She was a member of Indonesia's 2007 Sudirman Cup (combined men's and women's) team which finished second to China.

== Personal life ==
When she was young, she joined the Jaya Raya Jakarta badminton club. Her father's name is Agus S. and her mother is Retno S. Her hobbies are reading and playing guitar. Generally people call her "Rani".

== Achievements ==
=== BWF Superseries ===
The BWF Superseries, which was launched on 14 December 2006 and implemented in 2007, was a series of elite badminton tournaments, sanctioned by the Badminton World Federation (BWF). BWF Superseries levels were Superseries and Superseries Premier. A season of Superseries consisted of twelve tournaments around the world that had been introduced since 2011. Successful players were invited to the Superseries Finals, which were held at the end of each year.

Women's doubles
Year	Tournament	Partner	Opponent	Score	Result
2008	Denmark Open	(Indonesia) Jo Novita	(Malaysia) Chin Eei Hui (Malaysia) Wong Pei Tty	21–23, 12–21	(silver) Runner-up

BWF Super Series tournament

=== BWF Grand Prix ===
The BWF Grand Prix had two levels, the Grand Prix and Grand Prix Gold. It was a series of badminton tournaments sanctioned by the Badminton World Federation (BWF) and played between 2007 and 2017. The World Badminton Grand Prix was sanctioned by the International Badminton Federation from 1983 to 2006.

Women's doubles
Year	Tournament	Partner	Opponent	Score	Result
2006	Philippines Open	(Indonesia) Endang Nursugianti	(Indonesia) Jo Novita (Indonesia) Greysia Polii	16–21, 13–21	(silver) Runner-up
2006	Bitburger Open	(Indonesia) Endang Nursugianti	(Singapore) Jiang Yanmei (Singapore) Li Yujia	11–21, 19–21	(silver) Runner-up
2006	Dutch Open	(Indonesia) Endang Nursugianti	(Germany) Michaela Peiffer (Germany) Kathrin Piotrowski	21–16, 21–16	(gold) Winner
2008	Chinese Taipei Open	(Indonesia) Jo Novita	(Chinese Taipei) Cheng Wen-hsing (Chinese Taipei) Chien Yu-chin	16–21, 17–21	(silver) Runner-up

BWF Grand Prix Gold tournament
BWF Grand Prix tournament

=== BWF International Challenge/Series/Asian Satellite ===
Women's doubles
Year	Tournament	Partner	Opponent	Score	Result
2004	Vietnam Satellite	(Indonesia) Endang Nursugianti	(Thailand) Duanganong Aroonkesorn (Thailand) Kunchala Voravichitchaikul	17–16, 12–15, 5–15	(silver) Runner-up
2004	Cheers Asian Satellite	(Indonesia) Endang Nursugianti	(Thailand) Duanganong Aroonkesorn (Thailand) Kunchala Voravichitchaikul	8–15, 15–12, 15–10	(gold) Winner
2004	India Satellite	(Indonesia) Apriliana Rintan	(Thailand) Soratja Chansrisukot (Thailand) Molthila Meemeak	15–4, 15–5	(gold) Winner
2005	Jakarta Satellite	(Indonesia) Apriliana Rintan	(Indonesia) Meiliana Jauhari (Indonesia) Purwati	7–15, 15–12, 15–3	(gold) Winner
