= Badminton at the 2006 Commonwealth Games =

- Venue: Melbourne Convention and Exhibition Centre
- Location: Melbourne, Australia
- Dates: 15–26 March 2006

Badminton at the 2006 Commonwealth Games was the 11th appearance of Badminton at the Commonwealth Games, Competition took place in Melbourne, Australia, from 15 to 26 March 2006 and featured contests in six events.

The events were held at the purpose-built temporary venue within the Melbourne Convention and Exhibition Centre.

Malaysia topped the badminton medal table by virtue of winning four gold medals.

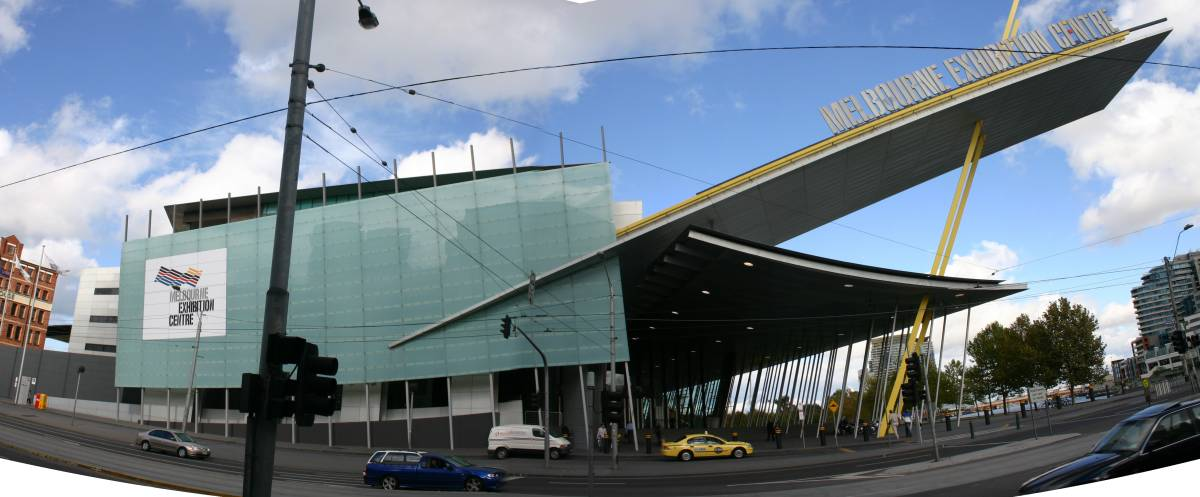
Melbourne Exhibition Centre

== Medal table ==
Rank	Nation	Gold	Silver	Bronze	Total
1	Malaysia	4	3	0	7
2	England	2	1	2	5
3	Singapore	0	1	1	2
4	New Zealand	0	1	0	1
5	India	0	0	2	2
6	Scotland	0	0	1	1
Totals (6 entries)		6	6	6	18

== Final results ==
Event	Gold	Silver	Bronze
Men's singles	Lee Chong Wei; Malaysia	Wong Choong Hann; Malaysia	Chetan Anand; India
Women's singles	Tracey Hallam; England	Wong Mew Choo; Malaysia	Susan Hughes; Scotland
Men's doubles	Malaysia; Koo Kien Keat; Chan Chong Ming	Malaysia; Choong Tan Fook; Wong Choong Hann	England; Robert Blair; Anthony Clark
Women's doubles	Malaysia; Chin Eei Hui; Wong Pei Tty	Singapore; Jiang Yanmei; Li Yujia	England; Gail Emms; Donna Kellogg
doubles	England; Nathan Robertson; Gail Emms	New Zealand; Dan Shirley; Sara Petersen	Singapore; Hendri Saputra; Li Yujia
Mixed team	Malaysia; Chan Chong Ming; Lee Chong Wei; Wong Choong Hann; Chin Eei Hui; Julia Wong Pei Xian; Koo Kien Keat; Wong Mew Choo; Wong Pei Tty; Ooi Sock Ai; Choong Tan Fook	England; Aamir Ghaffar; Anthony Clark; Donna Kellogg; Ella Tripp; Gail Emms; Joanne Nicholas; Nathan Robertson; Robert Blair; Simon Archer; Tracey Hallam	India; Anup Sridhar; Aparna Popat; Chetan Anand; Jwala Gutta; Rupesh Kumar; Saina Nehwal; Sanave Thomas Arattukulam; Shruti Kurian; Trupti Murgunde; Valiyaveetil Diju

== Results ==
=== Men's singles ===
Round of 16
(Malaysia) Lee Chong Wei	21	21
16	(Canada) Philippe Bourret	6	4
8	(India) Anup Sridhar	21	21
9	(New Zealand) Geoff Bellingham	10	10
5	(England) Aamir Ghaffar	21	21
12	(Singapore) Wei Kiat Aaron Tan	11	9
4	(Sri Lanka) Niluka Karunaratne	21	14	21
13	(Canada) Robert Milroy	13	21	10
6	(Malaysia) Wong Choong Hann	21	21
11	(Canada) Andrew Dabeka	14	16
3	(Singapore) Kendrick Lee Yen Hui	21	21
14	(Sri Lanka) Dinuka Karunaratne	11	4
7	(India) Chetan Anand	21	21
10	(Mauritius) Stephan Beeharry	14	6
2	(Singapore) Hendra Wijaya	21	21
15	(New Zealand) John Moody	15	9

Quarter-finals
(Malaysia) Lee Chong Wei	21	21
(India) Sridhar	15	18
(England) Ghaffar	21	21
(Sri Lanka) Karunaratne	19	19
(Malaysia) Hann	21	22
(Singapore) Lee	17	20
(India) Anand	21	13	21
(Singapore) Wijaya	16	21	11

Semi-finals
(Malaysia) Lee Chong Wei	21	21
(England) Ghaffar	8	9
(Malaysia) Hann	21	17	21
(India) Anand	11	21	13

Final
(Malaysia) Lee Chong Wei	21	21
(Malaysia) Hann	13	12
Third place
(India) Anand	21	18	21
(England) Ghaffar	17	21	13

=== Women's singles ===
Round of 16
1	(England) Tracey Hallam	21	21
16	(Wales) Kelly Morgan	10	13
8	(New Zealand) Rachel Hindley	21	21
9	(Australia) Tania Luiz	7	12
5	(Jersey) Elizabeth Cann	21	21
12	(Canada) Charmaine Reid	16	12
4	(India) Aparna Popat	10	23	21
13	(Singapore) Li Li	21	21	17
6	(Malaysia) Wong Mew Choo	21	21
11	(Jersey) Solenn Pasturel	6	11
3	(Singapore) Xing Aiying	14	21	21
14	(India) Saina Nehwal	21	13	6
7	(Scotland) Susan Hughes	21	21
10	(India) Trupti Murgunde	17	9
2	(Singapore) Fran Frances Liu	21	21
15	(Canada) Anna Rice	16	19

Quarter-finals
(England) Hallam	21	21
(New Zealand) Hindley	11	6
(Jersey) Cann	21	21
(India) Popat	13	14
(Malaysia) Choo	21	21
(Singapore) Xing Aiying	10	10
(Scotland) Hughes	21	21
(Singapore) Liu	18	19

Semi-finals
(England) Hallam	21	21
(Jersey) Cann	17	8
(Malaysia) Choo	21	21
(Scotland) Hughes	7	18

Final
(England) Hallam	21	21
(Malaysia) Choo	12	15
Third place
(Scotland) Hughes	21	13	21
(Jersey) Cann	5	21	19

=== Men's doubles ===
Quarterfinals
(Malaysia) Koo Kien Keat (Malaysia) Chan Chong Ming	21	21
(Singapore) Hendri Saputra (Singapore) Ronald Susilo	17	17
(Australia) Ashley Brehaut (Australia) Travis Denney	22	21	21
(New Zealand) Geoff Bellingham (New Zealand) Craig Cooper	24	16	19
(Malaysia) Choong Tan Fook (Malaysia) Wong Choong Hann	21	21
(Wales) Joe Morgan (Wales) James Phillips	14	9
(England) Robert Blair (England) Anthony Clark	21	21
(New Zealand) Daniel Shirley (New Zealand) John Moody	11	9

Semifinals
(Malaysia) Keat (Malaysia) Ming	21	21
(Australia) Brehaut (Australia) Denney	11	8
(Malaysia) Fook (Malaysia) Hann	21	21
(England) Blair (England) Clark	12	11

Finals
(Malaysia) Keat (Malaysia) Ming	21	21
(Malaysia) Fook (Malaysia) Hann	13	14
Third place
(England) Blair (England) Clark	21	21
(Australia) Brehaut (Australia) Denney	6	14

=== Women's doubles ===
Quarterfinals
(Malaysia) Chin Eei Hui (Malaysia) Wong Pei Tty	21	21
(Scotland) Michelle Douglas (Scotland) Yuan Wemyss	16	14
(India) Trupti Murgunde (India) Saina Nehwal	5	21	23
(Canada) Charmaine Reid (Canada) Helen Nichol	21	17	21
(Singapore) Jiang Yanmei (Singapore) Li Yujia	21	21
(New Zealand) Nicole Gordon (New Zealand) Sara Petersen	13	4
(England) Gail Emms (England) Donna Kellogg	21	21
(India) Jwala Gutta (India) Shruti Kurian	17	10

Semifinals
(Malaysia) Hui (Malaysia) Tty	21	21
(India) Murgunde (India) Nehwal	8	3
(Singapore) Yanmei (Singapore) Yujia	21	21
(England) Emms (England) Kellogg	8	14

Finals
(Malaysia) Hui (Malaysia) Tty	21	21
(Singapore) Yanmei (Singapore) Yujia	17	19
Third place
(England) Emms (England) Kellogg	21	21
(India) Murgunde (India) Nehwal	14	9

=== Mixed doubles ===
Quarterfinals
(England) Nathan Robertson (England) Gail Emms	21	21
(Scotland) Andrew Bowman (Scotland) Kirsteen McEwan-Miller	8	6
(Singapore) Hendri Saputra (Singapore) Li Yujia	23	21
(Australia) Travis Denney (Australia) Kate Wilson-Smith	21	17
(New Zealand) Daniel Shirley (New Zealand) Sara Petersen	22	21
(Canada) William Milroy (Canada) Tamara Katrina Sun	20	11
(Malaysia) Koo Kien Keat (Malaysia) Wong Pei Tty	16	21	21
(Singapore) Hendra Wijaya (Singapore) Frances Liu Fan	21	11	11

Semifinals
(England) Robertson (England) Emms	19	21	21
(Singapore) Saputra (Singapore) Yujia	21	14	17
(New Zealand) Shirley (New Zealand) Petersen	15	21	21
(Malaysia) Koo (Malaysia) Wong	21	14	15

Finals
(England) Robertson (England) Emms	21	21
(New Zealand) Shirley (New Zealand) Petersen	17	10
Third place
(Singapore) Saputra (Singapore) Yujia	21	21	21
(Malaysia) Koo (Malaysia) Wong	14	23	6

=== Mixed team ===
==== Semi-finals ====
Team one	Team two	Score
England	India	3-2
Malaysia	New Zealand	3-1

==== Bronze play-off ====
India
3

New Zealand
1

			1	2	3
1	(India) (New Zealand)	Valiyaveetil Diju / Jwala Gutta; Daniel Shirley / Sara Petersen	21; 17	13; 21	21; 9
2	(India) (New Zealand)	Anup Sridhar; John Moody	21; 11	8; 21	21; 21
3	(India) (New Zealand)	Saina Nehwal; Rebecca Bellingham	21; 13	24; 22
4	(India) (New Zealand)	Sanave Thomas / Rupesh Kumar; Daniel Shirley / Craig Cooper	11; 21	21; 11	21; 18

==== Final ====
Malaysia
3

England
1

			1	2	3
1	(Malaysia) (England)	Wong Choong Hann / Sock Ai Ooi; Nathan Robertson / Gail Emms	15; 21	12; 21
2	(Malaysia) (England)	Lee Chong Wei; Aamir Ghaffar	21; 8	21; 8
3	(Malaysia) (England)	Wong Mew Choo; Tracey Hallam	27; 25	20; 22	21; 18
4	(Malaysia) (England)	Chan Chong Ming / Koo Kien Keat; Robert Blair / Anthony Clark	21; 14	21; 14

Mixed team preliminary matches were held on 16 March, 17 March, and 18 March. Finals were held on 19 March.
