= 2009 Korea Open Super Series =

The 2009 Korea Open Super Series was held from January 13, 2009, to January 18, 2009. It was a part of the 2009 BWF Super Series badminton tournament.

== Men's singles ==
=== Results ===
Quarterfinals
1 | (Malaysia) Lee Chong Wei | 18 | 21 | 21
6 | (South Korea) Park Sung Hwan | 21 | 7 | 16
(Hong Kong) Chan Yan Kit | 16 | 16
7 | (Poland) Przemysław Wacha | 21 | 21
Q | (South Korea) Son Wan Ho | 13 | 21 | 17
3 | (Denmark) Peter Gade | 21 | 9 | 21
(Indonesia) Simon Santoso | 21 | 21
(Indonesia) Andre Kurniawan Tedjono | 6 | 8

Semifinals
1 | (Malaysia) Lee Chong Wei | 21 | 21
7 | (Poland) Przemysław Wacha | 17 | 12
3 | (Denmark) Peter Gade | wo | wo
8 | (Indonesia) Simon Santoso | wo | wo

Finals
1 | (Malaysia) Lee Chong Wei | 18 | 21 | 17
3 | (Denmark) Peter Gade | 21 | 10 | 21

== Women's singles ==
=== Results ===
Quarterfinals
1 | (Hong Kong) Zhou Mi | 21 | 21
6 | (Bulgaria) Petya Nedelcheva | 16 | 17
4 | (France) Pi Hong Yan | 21 | 21
(Japan) Mayu Sekiya | 13 | 14
7 | (South Korea) Hwang Hye Youn | 21 | 19 | 14
3 | (Hong Kong) Wang Chen | 18 | 21 | 21
(Indonesia) Adrianti Firdasari | 21 | 12 | 11
2 | (Denmark) Tine Rasmussen | 13 | 21 | 21

Semifinals
1 | (Hong Kong) Zhou Mi | 21 | 21 | 12
4 | (France) Pi Hong Yan | 23 | 19 | 21
3 | (Hong Kong) Wang Chen | 10 | 11
2 | (Denmark) Tine Rasmussen | 21 | 21

Finals
4 | (France) Pi Hong Yan | 19 | 19
2 | (Denmark) Tine Rasmussen | 21 | 21

== Men's doubles ==
=== Results ===
Quarterfinals
(Chinese Taipei) Fang Chieh Min (Chinese Taipei) Lee Sheng Mu | 21 | 22
5 | (Malaysia) Choong Tan Fook (Malaysia) Lee Wan Wah | 14 | 20
4 | (Denmark) Mathias Boe (Denmark) Carsten Mogensen | 21 | 22 | 21
(Indonesia) Mohammad Ahsan (Indonesia) Bona Septano | 17 | 24 | 14
8 | (Poland) Michal Logosz (Poland) Robert Mateusiak | 16 | 10
3 | (Denmark) Lars Paaske (Denmark) Jonas Rasmussen | 21 | 21
(South Korea) Han Sang Hoon (South Korea) Shin Baek-cheol | 14 | 13
2 | (South Korea) Jung Jae Sung (South Korea) Lee Yong Dae | 21 | 21

Semifinals
(Chinese Taipei) Fang Chieh Min (Chinese Taipei) Lee Sheng Mu | 16 | 14
4 | (Denmark) Mathias Boe (Denmark) Carsten Mogensen | 21 | 21
3 | (Denmark) Lars Paaske (Denmark) Jonas Rasmussen | 11 | 7
2 | (South Korea) Jung Jae Sung (South Korea) Lee Yong Dae | 21 | 21

Finals
4 | (Denmark) Mathias Boe (Denmark) Carsten Mogensen | 21 | 24
2 | (South Korea) Jung Jae Sung (South Korea) Lee Yong Dae | 12 | 22

== Women's doubles ==
=== Results ===
Quarterfinals
1 | (Chinese Taipei) Cheng Wen Hsing (Chinese Taipei) Chien Yu Chin | 21 | 25
6 | (Indonesia) Shendy Puspa Irawati (Indonesia) Meiliana Jauhari | 14 | 23
4 | (South Korea) Ha Jung Eun (South Korea) Kim Min Jung | 21 | 20 | 18
5 | (China) Gao Ling (China) Wei Yili | 13 | 22 | 21
(South Korea) Eom Hye Won (South Korea) Jung Kyung Eun | 19 | 16
3 | (China) Yang Wei (China) Zhang Jiewen | 21 | 21
7 | (Denmark) Helle Nielsen (Denmark) Marie Roepke | 19 | 13
2 | (South Korea) Lee Hyo-jung (South Korea) Lee Kyung Won | 21 | 21

Semifinals
1 | (Chinese Taipei) Cheng Wen Hsing (Chinese Taipei) Chien Yu Chin | 21 | 21
5 | (China) Gao Ling (China) Wei Yili | 15 | 17
3 | (China) Yang Wei (China) Zhang Jiewen | 16 | 21 | 10
2 | (South Korea) Lee Hyo-jung (South Korea) Lee Kyung Won | 21 | 18 | 21

Finals
1 | (Chinese Taipei) Cheng Wen Hsing (Chinese Taipei) Chien Yu Chin | 21 | 21
2 | (South Korea) Lee Hyo-jung (South Korea) Lee Kyung Won | 19 | 8

== Mixed doubles ==
=== Results ===
Quarterfinals
(India) Diju Valiyaveetil (India) Jwala Gutta | 21 | 16 | 21
8 | (Indonesia) Rendra Wijaya (Indonesia) Meiliana Jauhari | 17 | 21 | 9
4 | (Thailand) Songphon Anugritayawon (Thailand) Kunchala Voravichitchaikul | 17 | 21 | 21
6 | (Denmark) Joachim Fischer Nielsen (Denmark) Christinna Pedersen | 21 | 19 | 18
(Hong Kong) Yohan Hadikusumo Wiratama (Hong Kong) Chau Hoi Wah | 24 | 21
3 | (England) Robert Blair (Scotland) Imogen Bankier | 22 | 18
7 | (Indonesia) Fran Kurniawan (Indonesia) Shendy Puspa Irawati | 11 | 11
2 | (South Korea) Lee Yong Dae (South Korea) Lee Hyo-jung | 21 | 21

Semifinals
(India) Diju Valiyaveetil (India) Jwala Gutta | 19 | 20
4 | (Thailand) Songphon Anugritayawon (Thailand) Kunchala Voravichitchaikul | 21 | 22
(Hong Kong) Yohan Hadikusumo Wiratama (Hong Kong) Chau Hoi Wah | 16 | 11
2 | (South Korea) Lee Yong Dae (South Korea) Lee Hyo-jung | 21 | 21

Finals
4 | (Thailand) Songphon Anugritayawon (Thailand) Kunchala Voravichitchaikul | 8 | 7
2 | (South Korea) Lee Yong Dae (South Korea) Lee Hyo-jung | 21 | 21
