= Robert Lin Woon Fui =

Malaysian badminton player

Robert Lin Woon Fui 凌文辉
Personal information
- Born: March 31, 1983 (age 43) Kepong, Kuala Lumpur, Malaysia
- Height: 170 cm (5 ft 7 in)

Sport
- Country: Malaysia
- Sport: Badminton
- Coached by: Moe Chin Kiat, Rexy Mainaky, Park Joo-bong, Cheah Soon Kit
- Highest ranking: 4
Medal record
Men's badminton
Representing Malaysia
World Cup
Silver medal – second place	2006 Yiyang	Men's doubles
Asian Games
Bronze medal – third place	2006 Doha	Men's team
Southeast Asian Games
Bronze medal – third place	2007 Nakhon Ratchasima	Men's team
Bronze medal – third place	2007 Nakhon Ratchasima	Men's doubles

Robert Lin Woon Fui (born March 31, 1983) is a former Malaysian national badminton player. He came fifth at the 2006 IBF World Championships – Men's doubles with his partner Mohd Fairuzizuan Mohd Tazari. Lin works as a player-coach at the AirAsia Badminton Academy.

In July 8, 2022, Lin was charged in the Sessions Court Shah Alam, Malaysia with two counts of cheating. The charge, framed under Section 420 of the Penal Code for cheating and dishonestly inducing delivery of property, carry a sentence of up to 10 years jail, whipping and a fine, upon conviction.

However, at a hearing on 5 January 2026, the Sessions Court granted him a discharge not amounting to an acquittal, effectively clearing him of the charges after finding no basis for the case.

== Early life ==
Lin was born in Kepong, Malaysia. He was the second child of Lin Yuet Ming and Chin Nyok Chin. Lin's love for the sport developed while accompanying his father to badminton sessions at age six. Though he loved playing the drums, he opted for badminton and became school champion when he was nine.

Four years later, Lin joined the Badminton Association of Malaysia academy following the guidance of Selangor state coach Moe Chin Kiat. When he turned 17, the coaches at the BAM academy, including Malaysian shuttler Cheah Soon Kit saw his potential in doubles and directed him accordingly.

== Career ==
=== 2002 - 2006 ===
In 2002, Lin was promoted to the Malaysian national back-up squad where he began his partnership with Fairuzizuan. Two years later, the pair broke through at the 2004 Badminton Asia Championships where they landed their first title. They won the Malaysian National Circuit Grand Prix Finals a year later, upsetting favourites Chan Chong Ming-Koo Kien Keat in the finals on December 15.

Their numerous victories over legendary Chinese badminton duo Cai Yun/Fu Haifeng rank among their favourite moments. On January 19, 2006, they thrashed the defending champions 15-3, 15-6 in the All-England Open. The pair reached the semi-finals.

That same year, they reached the Malaysian Open finals. Lin and Fairuzizan again defeated Cai Yun-Fu Haifeng at the 2006 Badminton Asia Championships where they won 21-15, 13-21, 21-17.

The Malaysians were dubbed the “Chinese men's doubles killer” as they defeated Guo Zhendong and Xie Zhongbo in the 2006 Badminton World Federation World Championships in Madrid. They won 15-21, 21-16, 21-14.

Following numerous victories, Lin and Fairuzizuan's career stagnated and they split up in March 2007. Before their split, they helped Malaysia win the team bronze medal at the 2006 Asian Games, winning two of their three matches.

=== 2007 ===
Lin then partnered with Gan Teik Chai. Though the partnership took time to bear fruit, they won two bronze medals at the 2007 SEA Games in the men's doubles and team events.

They faced their former partners Fairuzizuan and Mohd Zakry Abdul Latif at the Singapore Super Series final in June 2008.

=== 2008 ===
Lin partnered briefly with youngster Goh V Shem with whom he won the 2008 Malaysia International Challenge, defeating Ong Jian Guo-Gan Teik Chai 21-19, 21-18.

=== 2009 - 2010 ===
In 2009, Lin became the head coach of the AirAsia Badminton Academy. He occasionally competed in tournaments.

While with AirAsia he continued to mentor V Shem, partnering with him from October 2009 to January 2010 while also pairing with Thien How Hoon.

Under Lin's tutelage, Shem formed a formidable partnership with Tan Wee Kiong, winning a silver medal at the 2014 Commonwealth Games and 2016 Olympic Games.

=== 2011 - ===
Lin took a few years off to concentrate on his coaching career before returning to competitive action. Partnered with his best friend Lee Yan Sheng, he reached the man draw for the Osaka International Challenge in 2013 and the Smiling Fish Thailand International Series.

Lin played in the inaugural Purple League for the Johor-based Nusajaya Badminton Club, and coached several Hong Kong celebrities and prominent Malaysians in his spare time.

== Personal life ==
He married squash international Delia Arnold.

== Achievements ==
=== World Cup ===
Men's doubles
Year	Venue	Partner	Opponent	Score	Result
2006	Olympic Park; Yiyang, China	(Malaysia) Mohd Fairuzizuan Tazari	(Indonesia) Markis Kido (Indonesia) Hendra Setiawan	18–21, 15–21	Silver

=== Southeast Asian Games ===
Men's doubles
Year	Venue	Partner	Opponent	Score	Result
2007	Wongchawalitkul University; Nakhon Ratchasima, Thailand	(Malaysia) Gan Teik Chai	(Indonesia) Markis Kido (Indonesia) Hendra Setiawan	15–21, 17–21	Bronze

=== IBF World Grand Prix/BWF Super Series ===
Men's doubles
Year	Tournament	Partner	Opponent	Score	Result
2006	Malaysia Open	(Malaysia) Mohd Fairuzizuan Tazari	(Malaysia) Chan Chong Ming (Malaysia) Koo Kien Keat	21–14, 11–21, 17–21	(silver) Runner-up
2008	Singapore Open	(Malaysia) Gan Teik Chai	(Malaysia) Mohd Fairuzizuan Tazari (Malaysia) Mohd Zakry Latif	18–21, 17–21	(silver) Runner-up

BWF Superseries tournament
IBF World Grand Prix tournament
