= Indonesia International =

Badminton championships

The Indonesia International is an international badminton tournament, which is held annually in Indonesia since 1997. It is organized by the Badminton Association of Indonesia. Since 2007, it is graded as the International Challenge, which are level 4 badminton tournaments. Since 2014, there are two different level 4 tournament: International Challenge and International Series which held in two different cities. Since 2022, there were two International Challenge tournament.

== Host ==
Year	City	Date	Tournament
1997	Jakarta	1–6 July	Indonesia International 1997
1998	Jakarta	30 June–5 July	Jakarta International 98
1999– 2000	No competition		
2001	Jakarta	24–29 April	Indonesia Jakarta Int 2001
2002– 2004	No competition		
2005	Jakarta	21–25 June	Jakarta Satellite 2005
2005	Surabaya	12–17 September	JPGG Surabaya Satellite 2005
2006	Jakarta	April	Jakarta Satellite 2006
2006	Surabaya	5–9 September	JPGG Surabaya Satellite 2006
2007	Surabaya	28 August–1 September	Indonesia–Surabaya Challenge 2007
2008	Jakarta	26–30 August	GGJP Indonesia Challenge 2008
2009	Jakarta	4–8 August	Astec Ultra Milk Open Indonesia International Challenge 2009
2010	Surabaya	27–31 July	Sunkist Indonesia International Challenge Indocock Djarum Open 2010
2011	Surabaya	19–24 July	Victor Indonesia International Challenge 2011
2012	Surabaya	2–7 July	Victor Indonesia International Challenge 2012
2013	Surabaya	2–7 July	Prim-A Indonesia International Challenge 2013
2014	Jakarta	15–20 April	USM Flypower International Series 2014
2014	Jakarta	12–16 August	Astec Indonesia International Challenge 2014
2015	Surabaya	14–19 April	USM Li-Ning International Series 2015
2015	Surabaya	1–6 September	Victor Indonesia International Challenge 2015
2016	Surabaya	9–15 May	Walikota Surabaya Victor International Series 2016
2016	Semarang	1–6 November	USM Victor International Challenge 2016

Year	City	Date	Tournament
2017	Surabaya	8–14 May	Victor International Series 2017
2017	Semarang	24–29 October	USM Flypower Indonesia International Challenge 2017
2018	Semarang	10–15 April	USM Indonesia International Series 2018
2018	Surabaya	23–28 October	PayTren Berkat Abadi Indonesia International Challenge 2018
2019	Magelang	22–27 October	Caffino Indonesia International Challenge 2019
2020– 2021	Cancelled		
2022	Yogyakarta	20–25 September	Kapal Api Indonesia International Series 2022
2022	Yogyakarta	27 September–2 October	Mansion Sport Indonesia International Challenge 2022
2022	Malang	11–16 October	Mansion Sport Malang Indonesia International Challenge 2022
2023	Medan	29 August–3 September	Xpora Indonesia International Challenge 2023
2023	Surabaya	17–22 October	Xpora Indonesia International Challenge 2023 (Surabaya)
2024	Pekanbaru	20–25 August	WONDR by BNI Indonesia International Challenge 2024
2024	Surabaya	22–27 October	WONDR by BNI Indonesia International Challenge 2024 (Surabaya)
2025	Yogyakarta	11–16 November	WONDR BY BNI Indonesia International Challenge I 2025
2025	Yogyakarta	18–23 November	WONDR BY BNI Indonesia International Challenge II 2025
2026	Pontianak	25–30 August	POLYTRON Pontianak International Challenge 2026
2026	Surabaya	22–27 September	POLYTRON Surabaya International Challenge 2026
2026	Yogyakarta	17–22 November	POLYTRON Yogyakarta International Challenge 2026

Locations of Indonesia International host cities

== Past winners ==
=== Indonesia International Challenge ===
Year	Men's singles	Women's singles	Men's doubles	Women's doubles	Mixed doubles	Ref
1997	(Indonesia) George Rimarcdi	(Indonesia) Ellen Angelina	(Indonesia) Davis Efraim (Indonesia) Halim Haryanto	(Indonesia) Angeline de Pauw (Indonesia) Vita Marissa	(Indonesia) Bambang Suprianto (Indonesia) Rosalina Riseu	
1998	(Indonesia) Vidre Wibowo	(Indonesia) Yeni Diah	(Indonesia) Karel Mainaky (Indonesia) Nova Widianto	(Indonesia) Angeline de Pauw (Indonesia) Upi Chrisnawati	(Indonesia) Endra Mulyajaya (Indonesia) Angeline de Pauw	
1999– 2000	No competition					
2001	(Indonesia) Sidoro Aditya	(Indonesia) Atu Rosalina	(Indonesia) Davis Efraim (Indonesia) Karel Mainaky	(Indonesia) Ninna Ernita (Indonesia) Tetty Yunita	(Indonesia) Hendra Aprida Gunawan (Indonesia) Lita Nurlita	
2002– 2004	No competition					
2005 I	(Indonesia) Jeffer Rosobin	(Indonesia) Maria Kristin Yulianti	(Indonesia) Rohanda Agung (Indonesia) Enroe	(Indonesia) Apriliana Rintan (Indonesia) Rani Mundiasti	(India) Valiyaveetil Diju (India) Jwala Gutta	
2005 II	(South Korea) Park Sung-hwan	(Indonesia) Maria Kristin Yulianti	(Indonesia) Tri Kusharjanto (Indonesia) Bambang Suprianto	(South Korea) Ha Jung-eun (South Korea) Kim Min-jung	(Indonesia) Bambang Suprianto (Indonesia) Minarti Timur	
2006 I	(Indonesia) Tommy Sugiarto	(Indonesia) Pia Zebadiah Bernadet	(Indonesia) Hendra Aprida Gunawan (Indonesia) Joko Riyadi	(Indonesia) Nitya Krishinda Maheswari (Indonesia) Nadya Melati	(Indonesia) Lingga Lie (Indonesia) Yulianti	
2006 II	(Indonesia) Jeffer Rosobin	(Indonesia) Maria Kristin Yulianti	(Indonesia) Ade Lukas (Indonesia) Rian Sukmawan	(Indonesia) Meiliana Jauhari (Indonesia) Purwati	(Indonesia) Tri Kusharjanto (Indonesia) Minarti Timur	
2007	(South Korea) Hong Ji-hoon	(Chinese Taipei) Chiu Yi-ju	(Indonesia) Yonathan Suryatama Dasuki (Indonesia) Rian Sukmawan	(Indonesia) Shendy Puspa Irawati (Indonesia) Meiliana Jauhari	(Indonesia) Tontowi Ahmad (Indonesia) Yulianti	
2008	(Indonesia) Andre Kurniawan Tedjono	(South Korea) Bae Youn-joo	(Indonesia) Fran Kurniawan (Indonesia) Rendra Wijaya	(Indonesia) Shendy Puspa Irawati (Indonesia) Meiliana Jauhari	(Indonesia) Fran Kurniawan (Indonesia) Shendy Puspa Irawati	
2009	(Indonesia) Dionysius Hayom Rumbaka	(Indonesia) Fransisca Ratnasari	(Indonesia) Alvent Yulianto Chandra (Indonesia) Hendra Aprida Gunawan	(Indonesia) Vita Marissa (Indonesia) Nadya Melati	(Indonesia) Riky Widianto (Indonesia) Devi Tika Permatasari	
2010	(Indonesia) Alamsyah Yunus	(Indonesia) Rosaria Yusfin Pungkasari	(Indonesia) Berry Angriawan (Indonesia) Muhammad Ulinnuha	(Indonesia) Suci Rizki Andini (Indonesia) Della Destiara Haris	(Indonesia) Hendra Mulyono (Indonesia) Ayu Rahmasari	
2011	(Indonesia) Tommy Sugiarto	(India) P. V. Sindhu	(Indonesia) Rian Sukmawan (Indonesia) Rendra Wijaya	(Indonesia) Suci Rizki Andini (Indonesia) Della Destiara Haris	(Indonesia) Andhika Anhar (Indonesia) Keshya Nurvita Hanadia	
2012	(Indonesia) Alamsyah Yunus	(Indonesia) Hera Desi	(Indonesia) Muhammad Ulinnuha (Indonesia) Ricky Karanda Suwardi	(Indonesia) Pia Zebadiah Bernadet (Indonesia) Rizki Amelia Pradipta	(South Korea) Lee Jae-jin (South Korea) Yoo Hyun-young	
2013	(Indonesia) Jonatan Christie	(Indonesia) Dinar Dyah Ayustine	(Indonesia) Didit Juang Indrianto (Indonesia) Praveen Jordan	(Indonesia) Maretha Dea Giovani (Indonesia) Melvira Oklamona	(Indonesia) Ardiansyah Putra (Indonesia) Devi Tika Permatasari	
2014	(South Korea) Lee Hyun-il	(Japan) Mayu Matsumoto	(Indonesia) Fajar Alfian (Indonesia) Muhammad Rian Ardianto	(Indonesia) Suci Rizki Andini (Indonesia) Tiara Rosalia Nuraidah	(Indonesia) Ronald Alexander (Indonesia) Melati Daeva Oktavianti	
2015	(Indonesia) Sony Dwi Kuncoro	(Indonesia) Gregoria Mariska Tunjung	(Indonesia) Berry Angriawan (Indonesia) Rian Agung Saputro	(Indonesia) Gebby Ristiyani Imawan (Indonesia) Tiara Rosalia Nuraidah	(Indonesia) Fran Kurniawan (Indonesia) Komala Dewi	
2016	(Indonesia) Shesar Hiren Rhustavito	(Indonesia) Fitriani	(Malaysia) Chooi Kah Ming (Malaysia) Low Juan Shen	(Malaysia) Lim Yin Loo (Malaysia) Yap Cheng Wen	(Indonesia) Yantoni Edy Saputra (Indonesia) Marsheilla Gischa Islami	
2017	(Indonesia) Shesar Hiren Rhustavito	(Japan) Shiori Saito	(Indonesia) Sabar Karyaman Gutama (Indonesia) Frengky Wijaya Putra	(Indonesia) Febriana Dwipuji Kusuma (Indonesia) Tiara Rosalia Nuraidah	(Indonesia) Rehan Naufal Kusharjanto (Indonesia) Siti Fadia Silva Ramadhanti	
2018	(Indonesia) Chico Aura Dwi Wardoyo	(Japan) Shiori Saito	(Indonesia) Sabar Karyaman Gutama (Indonesia) Frengky Wijaya Putra	(Indonesia) Tania Oktaviani Kusumah (Indonesia) Vania Arianti Sukoco	(Japan) Kohei Gondo (Japan) Ayane Kurihara	
2019	(Indonesia) Ikhsan Rumbay	(Japan) Asuka Takahashi	(South Korea) Kang Min-hyuk (South Korea) Kim Jae-hwan	(Indonesia) Anggia Shitta Awanda (Indonesia) Pia Zebadiah Bernadet	(Indonesia) Zachariah Josiahno Sumanti (Indonesia) Hediana Julimarbela	
2020	Cancelled (Note: This tournament, originally to be played from 20 to 25 October, was later cancelled due to the COVID-19 pandemic in Indonesia.)					
2021	Cancelled (Note: This tournament, originally to be played from 1 to 5 December, was later cancelled due to the COVID-19 pandemic in Indonesia.)					
2022 I	(Chinese Taipei) Lin Kuan-ting	(Indonesia) Ester Nurumi Tri Wardoyo	(Japan) Takumi Nomura (Japan) Yuichi Shimogami	(Indonesia) Anggia Shitta Awanda (Indonesia) Putri Larasati	(Indonesia) Akbar Bintang Cahyono (Indonesia) Marsheilla Gischa Islami	
2022 II	(China) Weng Hongyang	(China) Gao Fangjie	(Indonesia) Rahmat Hidayat (Indonesia) Pramudya Kusumawardana	(Indonesia) Lanny Tria Mayasari (Indonesia) Ribka Sugiarto	(Indonesia) Dejan Ferdinansyah (Indonesia) Gloria Emanuelle Widjaja	
2022 III	Cancelled (Note: This tournament, originally to be played on 15–20 November, was later cancelled.)					
2023 I	(Indonesia) Alwi Farhan	(Indonesia) Ester Nurumi Tri Wardoyo	(Indonesia) Berry Angriawan (Indonesia) Rian Agung Saputro	(Indonesia) Jesita Putri Miantoro (Indonesia) Febi Setianingrum	(Thailand) Weeraphat Phakjarung (Thailand) Ornnicha Jongsathapornparn	
2023 II	(Malaysia) Aidil Sholeh	(South Korea) Sim Yu-jin	(Japan) Kenya Mitsuhashi (Japan) Hiroki Okamura	(Thailand) Laksika Kanlaha (Thailand) Phataimas Muenwong	(Japan) Hiroki Nishi (Japan) Akari Sato	
2024 I	(Indonesia) Yohanes Saut Marcellyno	(Japan) Hina Akechi	(South Korea) Ki Dong-ju (South Korea) Kim Jae-hyeon	(Japan) Miki Kanehiro (Japan) Rui Kiyama	(Indonesia) Jafar Hidayatullah (Indonesia) Felisha Pasaribu	
2024 II	(Japan) Koo Takahashi	(Thailand) Yataweemin Ketklieng	(Indonesia) Rahmat Hidayat (Indonesia) Yeremia Rambitan	(Indonesia) Lanny Tria Mayasari (Indonesia) Siti Fadia Silva Ramadhanti	(Indonesia) Jafar Hidayatullah (Indonesia) Felisha Pasaribu	
2025 I	(Indonesia) Prahdiska Bagas Shujiwo	(Indonesia) Thalita Ramadhani Wiryawan	(Indonesia) Putra Erwiansyah (Indonesia) Daniel Edgar Marvino	(Chinese Taipei) Lin Chih-chun (Chinese Taipei) Lin Wan-ching	(Indonesia) Bobby Setiabudi (Indonesia) Melati Daeva Oktavianti	
2025 II	(Chinese Taipei) Liao Jhuo-fu	(South Korea) Kim Min-ji	(Indonesia) Ali Faathir Rayhan (Indonesia) Devin Artha Wahyudi	(Chinese Taipei) Lin Chih-chun (Chinese Taipei) Lin Wan-ching	(Indonesia) Bobby Setiabudi (Indonesia) Melati Daeva Oktavianti	
2026 I	(Indonesia) Richie Duta Richardo	(India) Tanvi Patri	(Indonesia) Wahyu Agung Prasetyo (Indonesia) Pulung Ramadhan	(South Korea) Kim Yu-jung (South Korea) Lee Yu-lim	(Indonesia) Dejan Ferdinansyah (Indonesia) Apriyani Rahayu	
2026 II	(Indonesia) Bismo Raya Oktora	(Japan) Sakura Masuki	(Indonesia) Taufik Aderya (Indonesia) Alexius Ongkytama Subagio	(Japan) Mikoto Aiso (Japan) Momoha Niimi	(Indonesia) Rehan Naufal Kusharjanto (Indonesia) Melati Daeva Oktavianti	
2026 III	(Indonesia) Muhammad Rizky Akbar	(Malaysia) Oo Shan Zi	(Chinese Taipei) Chiu Shao-hua (Chinese Taipei) Lin Bing-wei	(Indonesia) Lanny Tria Mayasari (Indonesia) Ester Nurumi Tri Wardoyo	(Indonesia) Muhammad Al Farizi (Indonesia) Jessica Maya Rismawardani	

=== Indonesia International Series ===
Year	Men's singles	Women's singles	Men's doubles	Women's doubles	Mixed doubles	Ref
2014	(Indonesia) Setyaldi Putra Wibowo	(Indonesia) Febby Angguni	(Indonesia) Afiat Yuris Wirawan (Indonesia) Yohanes Rendy Sugiarto	(Indonesia) Dian Fitriani (Indonesia) Nadya Melati	(Indonesia) Lukhi Apri Nugroho (Indonesia) Masita Mahmudin	
2015	(Indonesia) Wisnu Yuli Prasetyo	(Indonesia) Fitriani	(Indonesia) Fajar Alfian (Indonesia) Muhammad Rian Ardianto	(Indonesia) Gebby Ristiyani Imawan (Indonesia) Tiara Rosalia Nuraidah	(Indonesia) Irfan Fadhilah (Indonesia) Weni Anggraini	
2016	(Malaysia) Goh Giap Chin	(Japan) Moe Araki	(Indonesia) Fajar Alfian (Indonesia) Muhammad Rian Ardianto	(Indonesia) Apriyani Rahayu (Indonesia) Jauza Fadhila Sugiarto	(Indonesia) Agripinna Prima Rahmanto Putra (Indonesia) Apriyani Rahayu	
2017	(Indonesia) Shesar Hiren Rhustavito	(Malaysia) Kisona Selvaduray	(Indonesia) Wahyu Nayaka (Indonesia) Ade Yusuf Santoso	(Malaysia) Soong Fie Cho (Malaysia) Tee Jing Yi	(China) Ou Xuanyi (China) Liu Lin	
2018	(Indonesia) Shesar Hiren Rhustavito	(Indonesia) Aurum Oktavia Winata	(Indonesia) Rian Swastedian (Indonesia) Amri Syahnawi	(Indonesia) Shella Devi Aulia (Indonesia) Pia Zebadiah Bernadet	(Indonesia) Amri Syahnawi (Indonesia) Shella Devi Aulia	
2019– 2021	No competition					
2022	(Indonesia) Ikhsan Rumbay	(Indonesia) Mutiara Ayu Puspitasari	(Indonesia) Alfian Eko Prasetya (Indonesia) Ade Yusuf Santoso	(Indonesia) Ririn Amelia (Indonesia) Virni Putri	(Indonesia) Dejan Ferdinansyah (Indonesia) Gloria Emanuelle Widjaja	

== Performances by nation ==
=== Indonesia International Challenge ===
As of the 2026 Indonesia International III edition

Pos	Nation	MS	WS	MD	WD	XD	Total
1	Indonesia*	23	16	25	23	26	113
2	Japan	1	6	2	2	2	13
3	South Korea	3	3	2	2	1	11
4	Chinese Taipei	2	1	1	2		6
5	Malaysia	1	1	1	1		4
6	India		2			1	3
6	Thailand		1		1	1	3
8	China	1	1				2
Total		31	31	31	31	31	155

* Host nation

=== Indonesia International Series ===
As of the 2022 edition

Pos	Nation	MS	WS	MD	WD	XD	Total
1	Indonesia*	5	4	6	5	5	25
2	Malaysia	1	1		1		3
3	China					1	1
3	Japan		1				1
Total		6	6	6	6	6	30

* Host nation

== See also ==
- Indonesia Open
- Indonesia Masters
- Indonesia Masters Super 100
