= Wong Pei Tty =

Malaysian badminton player

Wong Pei Tty 黄佩蒂
Personal information
- Born: 11 November 1981 (age 45) Ipoh, Perak, Malaysia
- Years active: 1997–2012
- Height: 1.62 m (5 ft 4 in)
- Weight: 60 kg (132 lb)

Sport
- Country: Malaysia
- Sport: Badminton
- Handedness: Right
- Coached by: Cheah Soon Kit

Women's & mixed doubles
- Highest ranking: 1 (WD 13 May 2009)
- BWF profile
Medal record
Women's badminton
Representing Malaysia
World Championships
Bronze medal – third place	2006 Madrid	Mixed doubles
World Cup
Bronze medal – third place	2006 Yiyang	Women's doubles
Sudirman Cup
Bronze medal – third place	2009 Guangzhou	Mixed team
Commonwealth Games
Gold medal – first place	2006 Melbourne	Women's doubles
Gold medal – first place	2006 Melbourne	Mixed team
Bronze medal – third place	2002 Manchester	Women's doubles
Asian Games
Bronze medal – third place	2006 Doha	Mixed doubles
Asian Championships
Bronze medal – third place	2004 Kuala Lumpur	Women's doubles
Bronze medal – third place	2007 Johor Bahru	Mixed doubles
Southeast Asian Games
Gold medal – first place	2005 Manila	Women's doubles
Gold medal – first place	2009 Vientiane	Women's doubles
Gold medal – first place	2009 Vientiane	Women's team
Bronze medal – third place	2001 Kuala Lumpur	Women's doubles
Bronze medal – third place	2001 Kuala Lumpur	Mixed doubles
Bronze medal – third place	2001 Kuala Lumpur	Women's team
Bronze medal – third place	2003 Vietnam	Women's doubles
Bronze medal – third place	2005 Manila	Mixed doubles
Bronze medal – third place	2005 Manila	Women's team
Bronze medal – third place	2007 Nakhon Ratchasima	Women's team
Bronze medal – third place	2009 Vientiane	Mixed doubles

Wong Pei Tty (Chinese: 黃佩蒂; Jyutping: Wong4 Pui3 Dai3; Pe̍h-ōe-jī: N̂g Pōe-tè, born 11 November 1981) is a Malaysian former doubles badminton player. Wong is currently the Head Coach of the Badminton Academy in Singapore Sport School. Her previous stint included being coach for Malaysia women's doubles national team.

== Career ==
Wong competed in badminton at the 2004 Summer Olympics in women's doubles with partner Chin Eei Hui. They defeated Seiko Yamada and Shizuka Yamamoto of Japan in the first round but were defeated by Gao Ling and Huang Sui of China in the round of 16. Together, Wong and Chin achieved much success by winning Superseries and Superseries Finals titles. They also clinched gold and bronze medals in 2010 and 2002 Commonwealth Games. Although not well known as a mixed doubles player, Wong created history for Malaysia as the only female player to have won a medal in mixed doubles at the World Championships and Asian Games in the same year (2006), with different partners.

== Achievements ==
=== World Championships ===
Mixed doubles
Year	Venue	Partner	Opponent	Score	Result
2006	Palacio de Deportes de la Comunidad, Madrid, Spain	(Malaysia) Koo Kien Keat	(England) Anthony Clark (England) Donna Kellogg	14–21, 12–21	Bronze

=== World Cup ===
Women's doubles
Year	Venue	Partner	Opponent	Score	Result
2006	Olympic Park, Yiyang, China	(Malaysia) Chin Eei Hui	(China) Yang Wei (China) Zhang Jiewen	15–21, 14–21	Bronze

=== Commonwealth Games ===
Women's doubles
Year	Venue	Partner	Opponent	Score	Result
2002	Bolton Arena, Manchester, England	(Malaysia) Chin Eei Hui	(New Zealand) Nicole Gordon (New Zealand) Sara Petersen	3–7, 3–7, 3–7	Bronze
2006	Melbourne Convention and Exhibition Centre, Melbourne, Australia	(Malaysia) Chin Eei Hui	(Singapore) Jiang Yanmei (Singapore) Li Yujia	21–17, 21–19	Gold

=== Asian Games ===
Mixed doubles
Year	Venue	Partner	Opponent	Score	Result
2006	Aspire Hall 3, Doha, Qatar	(Malaysia) Mohd Fairuzizuan Tazari	(China) Zheng Bo (China) Gao Ling	11–21, 13–21	Bronze

=== Asian Championships ===
Women's doubles
Year	Venue	Partner	Opponent	Score	Result
2004	Kuala Lumpur Badminton Stadium, Kuala Lumpur, Malaysia	(Malaysia) Chin Eei Hui	(South Korea) Lee Hyo-jung (South Korea) Lee Kyung-won	14–17, 15–4, 6–15	Bronze

Mixed doubles
Year	Venue	Partner	Opponent	Score	Result
2007	Bandaraya Stadium, Johor Bahru, Malaysia	(Malaysia) Mohd Fairuzizuan Tazari	(China) Xu Chen (China) Zhao Tingting	19–21, 21–23	Bronze

=== Southeast Asian Games ===
Women's doubles
Year	Venue	Partner	Opponent	Score	Result
2001	Malawati Stadium, Selangor, Malaysia	(Malaysia) Norhasikin Amin	(Indonesia) Deyana Lomban (Indonesia) Vita Marissa	7–15, 17–15, 5–15	Bronze
2003	Tan Binh Sport Center, Ho Chi Minh City, Vietnam	(Malaysia) Chin Eei Hui	(Indonesia) Jo Novita (Indonesia) Lita Nurlita	12–15, 17–15, 6–15	Bronze
2005	PhilSports Arena, Metro Manila, Philippines	(Malaysia) Chin Eei Hui	(Indonesia) Jo Novita (Indonesia) Greysia Polii	15–12, 9–15, 15–13	Gold
2009	Gym Hall 1, National Sports Complex, Vientiane, Laos	(Malaysia) Chin Eei Hui	(Singapore) Shinta Mulia Sari (Singapore) Yao Lei	21–12, 21–11	Gold

Mixed doubles
Year	Venue	Partner	Opponent	Score	Result
2001	Malawati Stadium, Selangor, Malaysia	(Malaysia) Chew Choon Eng	(Indonesia) Nova Widianto (Indonesia) Vita Marissa	2–15, 8–15	Bronze
2005	PhilSports Arena, Metro Manila, Philippines	(Malaysia) Koo Kien Keat	(Indonesia) Anggun Nugroho (Indonesia) Yunita Tetty	9–15, 5–15	Bronze
2009	Gym Hall 1, National Sports Complex, Vientiane, Laos	(Malaysia) Koo Kien Keat	(Indonesia) Nova Widianto (Indonesia) Lilyana Natsir	15–21, 15–21	Bronze

=== BWF Superseries ===
The BWF Superseries, launched on 14 December 2006 and implemented in 2007, is a series of elite badminton tournaments, sanctioned by Badminton World Federation (BWF). BWF Superseries has two level such as Superseries and Superseries Premier. A season of Superseries features twelve tournaments around the world, which introduced since 2011, with successful players invited to the Superseries Finals held at the year end.

Women's doubles
Year	Tournament	Partner	Opponent	Score	Result
2008	Japan Open	(Malaysia) Chin Eei Hui	(China) Cheng Shu (China) Zhao Yunlei	19–21, 21–5, 18–21	(silver) Runner-up
2008	Denmark Open	(Malaysia) Chin Eei Hui	(Indonesia) Rani Mundiasti (Indonesia) Jo Novita	23–21, 21–12	(gold) Winner
2008	French Open	(Malaysia) Chin Eei Hui	(China) Du Jing (China) Yu Yang	22–20, 19–21, 11–21	(silver) Runner-up
2008	China Open	(Malaysia) Chin Eei Hui	(China) Zhang Yawen (China) Zhao Tingting	14–21, 19–21	(silver) Runner-up
2008	World Superseries Masters Finals	(Malaysia) Chin Eei Hui	(Indonesia) Vita Marissa (Indonesia) Lilyana Natsir	21–15, 22–20	(gold) Winner
2009	Indonesia Open	(Malaysia) Chin Eei Hui	(China) Cheng Shu (China) Zhao Yunlei	21–16, 21–16	(gold) Winner
2009	World Superseries Masters Finals	(Malaysia) Chin Eei Hui	(Denmark) Lena Frier Kristiansen (Denmark) Kamilla Rytter Juhl	21–17, 21–14	(gold) Winner

BWF Super Series Finals tournament
BWF Super Series Premier tournament
BWF Super Series tournament

=== BWF Grand Prix ===
The BWF Grand Prix had two levels, the BWF Grand Prix and Grand Prix Gold. It was a series of badminton tournaments sanctioned by the Badminton World Federation (BWF) which was held from 2007 to 2017. The World Badminton Grand Prix sanctioned by International Badminton Federation (IBF) from 1983 to 2006.

Women's doubles
Year	Tournament	Partner	Opponent	Score	Result
2001	Thailand Open	(Malaysia) Norhasikin Amin	(Indonesia) Eny Erlangga (Indonesia) Jo Novita	4–7, 7–5, 0–7, 2–7	(silver) Runner-up
2005	Indonesia Open	(Malaysia) Chin Eei Hui	(South Korea) Lee Hyo-jung (South Korea) Lee Kyung-won	4–15, 5–15	(silver) Runner-up
2005	Dutch Open	(Malaysia) Chin Eei Hui	(Netherlands) Mia Audina (Netherlands) Lotte Bruil	9–15, 10–15	(silver) Runner-up
2008	Thailand Open	(Malaysia) Chin Eei Hui	(China) Yang Wei (China) Zhang Jiewen	21–15, 13–21, 13–21	(silver) Runner-up
2009	Malaysia Grand Prix Gold	(Malaysia) Chin Eei Hui	(China) Ma Jin (China) Wang Xiaoli	9–21, 11–21	(silver) Runner-up
2011	Australian Open	(Malaysia) Chin Eei Hui	(Japan) Shizuka Matsuo (Japan) Mami Naito	18–21, 11–21	(silver) Runner-up
2012	Malaysia Grand Prix Gold	(Malaysia) Chin Eei Hui	(Singapore) Shinta Mulia Sari (Singapore) Yao Lei	21–18, 21–18	(gold) Winner

Mixed doubles
Year	Tournament	Partner	Opponent	Score	Result
2004	Singapore Open	(Malaysia) Koo Kien Keat	(Indonesia) Nova Widianto (Indonesia) Liliyana Natsir	1–15, 4–15	(silver) Runner-up
2004	Chinese Taipei Open	(Malaysia) Koo Kien Keat	(Indonesia) Muhammad Rijal (Indonesia) Endang Nursugianti	15–3, 15–5	(gold) Winner

BWF Grand Prix Gold tournament
BWF Grand Prix tournament

=== IBF International ===
Women's doubles
Year	Tournament	Partner	Opponent	Score	Result
2001	Indonesia International	(Malaysia) Norhasikin Amin	(Indonesia) Ninna Ernita (Indonesia) Yunita Tetty	7–15, 17–15, 7–15	(silver) Runner-up
2001	Malaysia Satellite	(Malaysia) Chin Eei Hui	(China) Cheng Jiao (China) Li Yujia	5–7, 6–8, 3–7	(silver) Runner-up

Mixed doubles
Year	Tournament	Partner	Opponent	Score	Result
1999	Malaysia Satellite	(Malaysia) Kantharoopan Ponniah	(Malaysia) Rosman Razak (Malaysia) Norhasikin Amin	15–6, 2–15, 10–15	(silver) Runner-up
