= Purwati =

Indonesian badminton player

Personal information
- Born: 8 June 1984 (age 42) Pekalongan, Central Java, Indonesia

Sport
- Country: Indonesia
- Sport: Badminton
- Event: Women's & mixed doubles

Women's & mixed doubles
- BWF profile
Medal record
Women's badminton
Representing Indonesia
World Junior Championships
Bronze medal – third place	2002 Pretoria	Mixed team

Purwati (born 8 June 1984) is an Indonesian badminton player specializes in doubles. Born in Pekalongan Regency, Purwati had joined the Djarum club in 2000. Together with Meiliana Jauhari, she won the international tournament in 2005 Malaysia Satellite, 2006 Brazil International, and Surabaya Satellite. She also won the mixed doubles title in Brazil partnered with Afiat Yuris Wirawan. Purwati was a women's doubles champion at the World Badminton Grand Prix tournament in Bulgaria Open with Jauhari.

== Achievements ==
=== IBF Grand Prix ===
The World Badminton Grand Prix was sanctioned by the International Badminton Federation from 1983 to 2006.

Women's doubles
Year	Tournament	Partner	Opponent	Score	Result
2004	Bulgaria Open	(Indonesia) Meiliana Jauhari	(Russia) Valeria Sorokina (Russia) Nina Vislova	21–10, 21–9	(gold) Winner

=== IBF International ===
Women's doubles
Year	Tournament	Partner	Opponent	Score	Result
2005	Jakarta Satellite	(Indonesia) Meiliana Jauhari	(Indonesia) Apriliana Rintan (Indonesia) Rani Mundiasti	15–7, 12–15, 3–15	(silver) Runner-up
2005	Malaysia Satellite	(Indonesia) Meiliana Jauhari	(South Korea) Kang Joo-young (South Korea) Lee Seul-gi	15–6, 11–15, 15–6	(gold) Winner
2006	Jakarta Satellite	(Indonesia) Meiliana Jauhari	(Indonesia) Nitya Krishinda Maheswari (Indonesia) Nadya Melati	14–21, 17–21	(silver) Runner-up
2006	Surabaya Satellite	(Indonesia) Meiliana Jauhari	(Indonesia) Nitya Krishinda Maheswari (Indonesia) Nadya Melati	21–16, 21–18	(gold) Winner
2006	Brazil International	(Indonesia) Meiliana Jauhari	(Canada) Valerie Loker (Canada) Sarah McMaster	21–8, 21–8	(gold) Winner

Mixed doubles
Year	Tournament	Partner	Opponent	Score	Result
2006	Brazil International	(Indonesia) Afiat Yuris Wirawan	(Indonesia) Danny Bawa Chrisnanta (Indonesia) Meiliana Jauhari	Walkover	(gold) Winner
