= Cheng Wen-hsing =

Taiwanese badminton player

Cheng Wen-hsing 程文欣
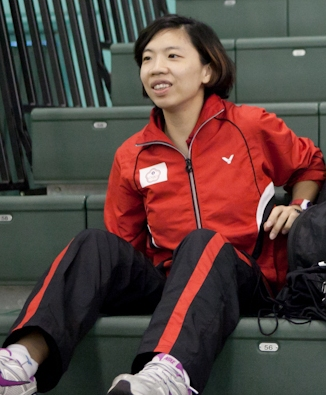

Personal information
- Born: 24 February 1982 (age 44) Taipei, Taiwan
- Height: 1.66 m (5 ft 5 in)
- Weight: 62 kg (137 lb)

Sport
- Country: Republic of China (Taiwan)
- Sport: Badminton
- Handedness: Right

Women's & mixed doubles
- Highest ranking: 1 (WD with Chien Yu-chin 1 October 2010); 5 (XD with Chen Hung-ling 13 September 2012)
Medal record
Women's badminton
Representing Chinese Taipei
World Championships
Bronze medal – third place	2010 Paris	Women's doubles
World Cup
Bronze medal – third place	2006 Yiyang	Women's doubles
Uber Cup
Bronze medal – third place	2006 Sendai–Tokyo	Women's team
Asian Games
Bronze medal – third place	2010 Guangzhou	Mixed doubles
Asian Championships
Silver medal – second place	2006 Johor Bahru	Women's doubles
Silver medal – second place	2008 Johor Bahru	Women's doubles
Bronze medal – third place	2008 Johor Bahru	Mixed doubles
Bronze medal – third place	2009 Suwon	Women's doubles
Bronze medal – third place	2010 New Delhi	Women's doubles
East Asian Games
Silver medal – second place	2013 Tianjin	Women's team
Silver medal – second place	2009 Hong Kong	Women's team
Bronze medal – third place	2013 Tianjin	Women's doubles
Summer Universiade
Gold medal – first place	2007 Bangkok	Women's doubles
Silver medal – second place	2007 Bangkok	Mixed doubles
Bronze medal – third place	2007 Bangkok	Mixed team
Asian Junior Championships
Bronze medal – third place	1998 Kuala Lumpur	Girls' team
Bronze medal – third place	1999 Yangon	Girls' team
Bronze medal – third place	2000 Kyoto	Mixed doubles
Bronze medal – third place	2000 Kyoto	Girls' team

Cheng Wen-hsing (Chinese: 程文欣; pinyin: Chéng Wénxīn; Wade–Giles: Ch'eng Wen-hsin; born 24 February 1982) is a Taiwanese former badminton player. She is now works as German national team coach.

== Career ==
Cheng competed for Chinese Taipei in the 2004 Olympics in the women's doubles with partner Chien Yu-chin. They defeated Helen Nichol and Charmaine Reid of Canada in the first round but were defeated by Hwang Yu-mi and Lee Hyo-jung of South Korea in the round of 16. Cheng also competed in the mixed doubles with partner Tsai Chia-hsin. They defeated Chris Dednam and Antoinette Uys of South Africa in the first round, but lost to Zhang Jun and Gao Ling of China in the round of 16.

During the 2008 Summer Olympics, Cheng again teamed with Chien Yu-chin in the women's doubles, reaching the quarter-finals. This pair also reached the quarter-finals at the 2012 Summer Olympics. Cheng and her mixed doubles partner, Chen Hung-ling, were less successful and did not qualify from the group stage.

She competed in four Asian Games from 2002 to 2014.

=== Coaching ===
- Malaysia national team for junior players (2016–).
- German national team for doubles players (2019–now).

== Achievements ==
=== BWF World Championships ===
Women's doubles
Year	Venue	Partner	Opponent	Score	Result
2010	Stade Pierre de Coubertin, Paris, France	(Chinese Taipei) Chien Yu-chin	(China) Du Jing (China) Yu Yang	16–21, 15–21	Bronze

=== World Cup ===
Women's doubles
Year	Venue	Partner	Opponent	Score	Result
2006	Olympic Park; Yiyang, China	(Chinese Taipei) Chien Yu-chin	(China) Gao Ling (China) Huang Sui	19–21, 13–21	Bronze

=== Asian Games ===
Mixed doubles
Year	Venue	Partner	Opponent	Score	Result
2010	Tianhe Gymnasium; Guangzhou, China	(Chinese Taipei) Chen Hung-ling	(China) Zhang Nan (China) Zhao Yunlei	16–21, 15–21	Bronze

=== Asian Championships ===
Women's doubles
Year	Venue	Partner	Opponent	Score	Result
2006	Bandaraya Stadium; Johor Bahru, Malaysia	(Chinese Taipei) Chien Yu-chin	(China) Du Jing (China) Yu Yang	11–21, 16–21	Silver
2008	Bandaraya Stadium; Johor Bahru, Malaysia	(Chinese Taipei) Chien Yu-chin	(China) Yang Wei (China) Zhang Jiewen	20–22, 16–21	Silver
2009	Suwon Indoor Stadium; Suwon, South Korea	(Chinese Taipei) Chien Yu-chin	(South Korea) Lee Hyo-jung (South Korea) Lee Kyung-won	19–21, 18–21	Bronze
2010	Siri Fort Indoor Stadium; New Delhi, India	(Chinese Taipei) Chien Yu-chin	(China) Pan Pan (China) Tian Qing	24–22, 16–21, 18–21	Bronze

Mixed doubles
Year	Venue	Partner	Opponent	Score	Result
2008	Bandaraya Stadium; Johor Bahru, Malaysia	(Chinese Taipei) Fang Chieh-min	(Indonesia) Flandy Limpele (Indonesia) Vita Marissa	17–21, 15–21	Bronze

=== East Asian Games ===
Women's doubles
Year	Venue	Partner	Opponent	Score	Result
2013	Binhai New Area Dagang Gymnasium; Tianjin, China	(Chinese Taipei) Hsieh Pei-chen	(China) Ou Dongni (China) Tang Yuanting	17–21, 18–21	Bronze

=== Summer Universiade ===
Women's doubles
Year	Venue	Partner	Opponent	Score	Result
2007	Thammasat University; Pathum Thani, Thailand	(Chinese Taipei) Chien Yu-chin	(China) Pan Pan (China) Tian Qing	21–9, 21–13	Gold

Mixed doubles
Year	Venue	Partner	Opponent	Score	Result
2007	Thammasat University; Pathum Thani, Thailand	(Chinese Taipei) Fang Chieh-min	(South Korea) Yoo Yeon Seong (South Korea) Kim Min-jung	19–21, 21–13, 17–21	Silver

=== World University Championships ===
Women's doubles
Year	Venue	Partner	Opponent	Score	Result
2002	Sport Center der Academy of Physical Education; Kraków, Poland	(Chinese Taipei) Chien Yu-chin	(China) Li Shasha (China) Zou Shisi	7–2, 7–0, 7–4	Gold

Mixed doubles
Year	Venue	Partner	Opponent	Score	Result
2004	Kasetsart University; Bangkok, Thailand	(Chinese Taipei) Tsai Chia-hsin	(Thailand) Sudket Prapakamol (Thailand) Kunchala Voravichitchaikul	15–11, 9–15, 10–15	Silver

=== Asian Junior Championships ===
Mixed doubles
Year	Venue	Partner	Opponent	Score	Result
2000	Nishiyama Park Gymnasium, Kyoto, Japan	(Chinese Taipei) Tsai Chia-hsin	(China) Zheng Bo (China) Wei Yili	3–15, 5–15	Bronze

=== BWF Superseries ===
The BWF Superseries, which was launched on 14 December 2006 and implemented in 2007, is a series of elite badminton tournaments, sanctioned by the Badminton World Federation (BWF). BWF Superseries levels are Superseries and Superseries Premier. A season of Superseries consists of twelve tournaments around the world that have been introduced since 2011. Successful players are invited to the Superseries Finals, which are held at the end of each year.

Women's doubles
Year	Tournament	Partner	Opponent	Score	Result
2008	Singapore Open	(Chinese Taipei) Chien Yu-chin	(China) Du Jing (China) Yu Yang	16–21, 19–21	(silver) Runner-up
2009	Korea Open	(Chinese Taipei) Chien Yu-chin	(South Korea) Lee Hyo-jung (South Korea) Lee Kyung-won	21–19, 21–8	(gold) Winner
2010	Indonesia Open	(Chinese Taipei) Chien Yu-chin	(South Korea) Kim Min-jung (South Korea) Lee Hyo-jung	12–21, 21–12, 11–21	(silver) Runner-up
2010	Hong Kong Open	(Chinese Taipei) Chien Yu-chin	(China) Wang Xiaoli (China) Yu Yang	11–21, 12–21	(silver) Runner-up
2011	Japan Open	(Chinese Taipei) Chien Yu-chin	(China) Bao Yixin (China) Zhong Qianxin	21–13, 23–25, 12–21	runner-up.
2012	Singapore Open	(Chinese Taipei) Chien Yu-chin	(China) Bao Yixin (China) Zhong Qianxin	12–21, 17–21	(silver) Runner-up

Mixed doubles
Year	Tournament	Partner	Opponent	Score	Result
2011	Singapore Open	(Chinese Taipei) Chen Hung-ling	(Indonesia) Tontowi Ahmad (Indonesia) Liliyana Natsir	14–21, 25–27	(silver) Runner-up
2011	Japan Open	(Chinese Taipei) Chen Hung-ling	(Denmark) Joachim Fischer Nielsen (Denmark) Christinna Pedersen	21–19, 16–21, 21–15	(gold) Winner
2012	Singapore Open	(Chinese Taipei) Chen Hung-ling	(Japan) Shintaro Ikeda (Japan) Reiko Shiota	21–17, 21–11	(gold) Winner

BWF Super Series Finals tournament
BWF Super Series Premier tournament
BWF Super Series tournament

=== BWF Grand Prix ===
The BWF Grand Prix had two levels, the BWF Grand Prix and Grand Prix Gold. It was a series of badminton tournaments sanctioned by the Badminton World Federation (BWF) which was held from 2007 to 2017. The World Badminton Grand Prix sanctioned by International Badminton Federation (IBF) from 1983 to 2006.

Women's doubles
Year	Tournament	Partner	Opponent	Score	Result
2004	U.S. Open	(Chinese Taipei) Chien Yu-chin	(Chinese Taipei) Chou Chia-chi (Chinese Taipei) Ku Pei-ting	15–12, 15–2	(gold) Winner
2004	Chinese Taipei Open	(Chinese Taipei) Chien Yu-chin	(Indonesia) Jo Novita (Indonesia) Lita Nurlita	15–4, 15–6	(gold) Winner
2005	Swiss Open	(Chinese Taipei) Chien Yu-chin	(South Korea) Lee Hyo-jung (South Korea) Lee Kyung-won	8–15, 12–15	(silver) Runner-up
2005	Chinese Taipei Open	(Chinese Taipei) Chien Yu-chin	(Australia) Kellie Lucas (Australia) Kate Wilson-Smith	15–8, 17–14	(gold) Winner
2007	Philippines Open	(Chinese Taipei) Chien Yu-chin	(China) Pan Pan (China) Tian Qing	22–20, 21–14	(gold) Winner
2007	Chinese Taipei Open	(Chinese Taipei) Chien Yu-chin	(Indonesia) Vita Marissa (Indonesia) Liliyana Natsir	21–15, 17–21, 21–18	(gold) Winner
2007	Russian Open	(Chinese Taipei) Chien Yu-chin	(China) Du Jing (China) Yu Yang	14–21, 14–21	(silver) Runner-up
2008	India Open	(Chinese Taipei) Chien Yu-chin	(Japan) Miyuki Maeda (Japan) Satoko Suetsuna	21–17, 21–16	(gold) Winner
2008	Chinese Taipei Open	(Chinese Taipei) Chien Yu-chin	(Indonesia) Rani Mundiasti (Indonesia) Jo Novita	21–16, 21–17	(gold) Winner
2010	Canada Open	(Chinese Taipei) Chien Yu-chin	(Germany) Sandra Marinello (Germany) Birgit Overzier	21–16, 18–21, 21–17	(gold) Winner
2010	U.S. Open	(Chinese Taipei) Chien Yu-chin	(Japan) Rie Eto (Japan) Yu Wakita	21–8, 22–20	(gold) Winner
2010	Macau Open	(Chinese Taipei) Chien Yu-chin	(Indonesia) Meiliana Jauhari (Indonesia) Greysia Polii	16–21, 21–18, 21–16	(gold) Winner
2011	Canada Open	(Chinese Taipei) Chien Yu-chin	(China) Bao Yixin (China) Cheng Shu	13–21, 21–23	(silver) Runner-up
2012	Australian Open	(Chinese Taipei) Chien Yu-chin	(China) Luo Ying (China) Luo Yu	21–12, 18–21, 17–21	(silver) Runner-up

Mixed doubles
Year	Tournament	Partner	Opponent	Score	Result
2004	U.S. Open	(Chinese Taipei) Lin Wei-hsiang	(England) David Lindley (England) Suzanne Rayappan	15–5, 15–7	(gold) Winner
2005	Chinese Taipei Open	(United States) Tony Gunawan	(Indonesia) Devin Lahardi Fitriawan (Indonesia) Vita Marissa	17–15, 15–6	(gold) Winner
2007	Macau Open	(Chinese Taipei) Fang Chieh-min	(China) Xie Zhongbo (China) Zhang Yawen	14–21, 16–21	(silver) Runner-up
2008	Chinese Taipei Open	(Chinese Taipei) Fang Chieh-min	(Indonesia) Devin Lahardi Fitriawan (Indonesia) Lita Nurlita	21–14, 11–21, 19–21	(silver) Runner-up
2009	Vietnam Open	(Indonesia) Flandy Limpele	(Malaysia) Chan Peng Soon (Malaysia) Goh Liu Ying	25–23, 21–19	(gold) Winner
2010	Canada Open	(Chinese Taipei) Chen Hung-ling	(Chinese Taipei) Lee Sheng-mu (Chinese Taipei) Chien Yu-chin	16–21, 21–11, 15–21	(silver) Runner-up
2011	U.S. Open	(Chinese Taipei) Chen Hung-ling	(South Korea) Lee Yong-dae (South Korea) Ha Jung-eun	19–21, 13–21	(silver) Runner-up
2011	Canada Open	(Chinese Taipei) Chen Hung-ling	(Germany) Michael Fuchs (Germany) Birgit Michels	10–21, 21–23	(silver) Runner-up
2011	Macau Open	(Chinese Taipei) Chen Hung-ling	(Indonesia) Tontowi Ahmad (Indonesia) Liliyana Natsir	Walkover	(silver) Runner-up
2012	Australian Open	(Chinese Taipei) Chen Hung-ling	(Malaysia) Chan Peng Soon (Malaysia) Goh Liu Ying	22–20, 12–21, 23–21	(gold) Winner

BWF Grand Prix Gold tournament
BWF Grand Prix tournament

=== BWF International Challenge/Series ===
Women's doubles
Year	Tournament	Partner	Opponent	Score	Result
2018	Dutch International	(Chinese Taipei) Chang Ya-lan	(Denmark) Amalie Magelund (Denmark) Freja Ravn	21–18, 27–25	(gold) Winner

BWF International Series tournament
