= Chin Eei Hui =

Malaysian badminton player and coach

Chin Eei Hui 陳儀慧
Personal information
- Born: 18 June 1982 (age 44) George Town, Penang, Malaysia
- Height: 1.63 m (5 ft 4 in)
- Weight: 61 kg (134 lb)

Sport
- Country: Malaysia
- Sport: Badminton
- Handedness: Left

Women's & Mixed doubles
- Highest ranking: 1 (WD 13 May 2009)
Medal record
Women's badminton
Representing Malaysia
World Cup
Bronze medal – third place	2006 Yiyang	Women's doubles
Sudirman Cup
Bronze medal – third place	2009 Guangzhou	Mixed team
Commonwealth Games
Gold medal – first place	2006 Melbourne	Women's doubles
Gold medal – first place	2006 Melbourne	Mixed team
Gold medal – first place	2010 New Delhi	Mixed doubles
Gold medal – first place	2010 New Delhi	Mixed team
Silver medal – second place	2002 Manchester	Mixed doubles
Bronze medal – third place	2002 Manchester	Women's doubles
Asian Championships
Bronze medal – third place	2004 Kuala Lumpur	Women's doubles
Southeast Asian Games
Gold medal – first place	2005 Manila	Women's doubles
Gold medal – first place	2009 Vientiane	Women's doubles
Gold medal – first place	2009 Vientiane	Women's team
Bronze medal – third place	2001 Kuala Lumpur	Women's team
Bronze medal – third place	2003 Vietnam	Women's doubles
Bronze medal – third place	2003 Vietnam	Mixed doubles
Bronze medal – third place	2005 Manila	Women's team
Bronze medal – third place	2007 Nakhon Ratchasima	Women's team

Chin Eei Hui
- Traditional Chinese: 陳儀慧
- Simplified Chinese: 陈仪慧
Transcriptions
Standard Mandarin
- Hanyu Pinyin: Chén Yíhuì
Hakka
- Pha̍k-fa-sṳ: Chhìn Ngì-fui
Yue: Cantonese
- Jyutping: Can4 Ji4 Wai6
Southern Min
- Hokkien POJ: Tân Gî-hūi

Chin Eei Hui (Chinese: 陳儀慧; Pe̍h-ōe-jī: Tân Gî-hūi; Hakka Pha̍k-fa-sṳ: Chhìn Ngì-fui; born 18 June 1982) is a former badminton player from Malaysia who plays in both women's and mixed doubles. She worked as a coach for Malaysia's national women's doubles players until her contract ended in 2020. Starting from 2021 until now, she has partnered with Li-Ning and works with independent players such as Tan Kian Meng, Lai Pei Jing, Teo Ee Yi and Ong Yew Sin.

== Career ==
Chin Eei Hui and her former women's doubles partner, Wong Pei Tty have ranked as high as No. 1 worldwide. Together, Chin and Wong achieved much success by winning Superseries and Superseries Finals titles. They also clinched gold and bronze medals in the 2010 and 2002 Commonwealth Games. Although not a regular mixed doubles player, Chin won a gold and a silver medal with different partners in the 2002 and 2010 Commonwealth Games. Chin competed in badminton at the 2004 Summer Olympics in women's doubles with partner Wong Pei Tty. They defeated Seiko Yamada and Shizuka Yamamoto of Japan in the first round but subsequently lost to Gao Ling and Huang Sui of China in the round of 16. Although not well known as a mixed doubles player, Chin created a first for Malaysia when she won the 2010 Commonwealth Games mixed doubles title, playing with Koo Kien Keat. She had also won a silver medal in the same event 8 years previously.

== Achievements ==
=== World Cup ===
Women's doubles
Year	Venue	Partner	Opponent	Score	Result
2006	Olympic Park, Yiyang, China	(Malaysia) Wong Pei Tty	(China) Yang Wei (China) Zhang Jiewen	15–21, 14–21	Bronze

=== Commonwealth Games ===
Women's doubles
Year	Venue	Partner	Opponent	Score	Result
2002	Bolton Arena, Manchester, England	(Malaysia) Wong Pei Tty	(New Zealand) Nicole Gordon (New Zealand) Sara Petersen	3–7, 3–7, 3–7	Bronze
2006	Melbourne Convention and Exhibition Centre, Melbourne, Australia	(Malaysia) Wong Pei Tty	(Singapore) Jiang Yanmei (Singapore) Li Yujia	21–17, 21–19	Gold

Mixed doubles
Year	Venue	Partner	Opponent	Score	Result
2002	Bolton Arena, Manchester, England	(Malaysia) Chew Choon Eng	(England) Simon Archer (England) Joanne Goode	7–0, 5–7, 3–7, 3–7	Silver
2010	Siri Fort Sports Complex, New Delhi, India	(Malaysia) Koo Kien Keat	(England) Nathan Robertson (England) Jenny Wallwork	22–20, 21–12	Gold

=== Asian Championships ===
Women's doubles
Year	Venue	Partner	Opponent	Score	Result
2004	Kuala Lumpur Badminton Stadium, Kuala Lumpur, Malaysia	(Malaysia) Wong Pei Tty	(South Korea) Lee Hyo-jung (South Korea) Lee Kyung-won	14–17, 15–4, 6–15	Bronze

=== Southeast Asian Games ===
Women's doubles
Year	Venue	Partner	Opponent	Score	Result
2003	Tan Binh Sport Center, Ho Chi Minh City, Vietnam	(Malaysia) Wong Pei Tty	(Indonesia) Jo Novita (Indonesia) Lita Nurlita	12–15, 17–15, 6–15	Bronze
2005	PhilSports Arena, Metro Manila, Philippines	(Malaysia) Wong Pei Tty	(Indonesia) Jo Novita (Indonesia) Greysia Polii	15–12, 9–15, 15–13	Gold
2009	Gym Hall 1, National Sports Complex, Vientiane, Laos	(Malaysia) Wong Pei Tty	(Singapore) Shinta Mulia Sari (Singapore) Yao Lei	21–12, 21–11	Gold

Mixed doubles
Year	Venue	Partner	Opponent	Score	Result
2003	Tan Binh Sport Center, Ho Chi Minh City, Vietnam	(Malaysia) Chew Choon Eng	(Indonesia) Anggun Nugroho (Indonesia) Eny Widyowati	0–2 retired	Bronze

=== BWF Superseries ===
The BWF Superseries, launched on 14 December 2006 and implemented in 2007, is a series of elite badminton tournaments, sanctioned by Badminton World Federation (BWF). BWF Superseries has two level such as Superseries and Superseries Premier. A season of Superseries features twelve tournaments around the world, which introduced since 2011, with successful players invited to the Superseries Finals held at the year end.

Women's doubles
Year	Tournament	Partner	Opponent	Score	Result
2008	Japan Open	(Malaysia) Wong Pei Tty	(China) Cheng Shu (China) Zhao Yunlei	19–21, 21–5, 18–21	(silver) Runner-up
2008	Denmark Open	(Malaysia) Wong Pei Tty	(Indonesia) Rani Mundiasti (Indonesia) Jo Novita	23–21, 21–12	(gold) Winner
2008	French Open	(Malaysia) Wong Pei Tty	(China) Du Jing (China) Yu Yang	22–20, 19–21, 11–21	(silver) Runner-up
2008	China Open	(Malaysia) Wong Pei Tty	(China) Zhang Yawen (China) Zhao Tingting	14–21, 19–21	(silver) Runner-up
2008	World Superseries Masters Finals	(Malaysia) Wong Pei Tty	(Indonesia) Vita Marissa (Indonesia) Lilyana Natsir	21–15, 22–20	(gold) Winner
2009	Indonesia Open	(Malaysia) Wong Pei Tty	(China) Cheng Shu (China) Zhao Yunlei	21–16, 21–16	(gold) Winner
2009	World Superseries Masters Finals	(Malaysia) Wong Pei Tty	(Denmark) Lena Frier Kristiansen (Denmark) Kamilla Rytter Juhl	21–17, 21–14	(gold) Winner

BWF Super Series Finals tournament
BWF Super Series Premier tournament
BWF Super Series tournament

=== BWF Grand Prix ===
The BWF Grand Prix had two levels, the BWF Grand Prix and Grand Prix Gold. It was a series of badminton tournaments sanctioned by the Badminton World Federation (BWF) which was held from 2007 to 2017. The World Badminton Grand Prix sanctioned by International Badminton Federation (IBF) from 1983 to 2006.

Women's doubles
Year	Tournament	Partner	Opponent	Score	Result
2005	Indonesia Open	(Malaysia) Wong Pei Tty	(South Korea) Lee Hyo-jung (South Korea) Lee Kyung-won	4–15, 5–15	(silver) Runner-up
2005	Dutch Open	(Malaysia) Wong Pei Tty	(Netherlands) Mia Audina (Netherlands) Lotte Bruil	9–15, 10–15	(silver) Runner-up
2008	Thailand Open	(Malaysia) Wong Pei Tty	(China) Yang Wei (China) Zhang Jiewen	21–15, 13–21, 13–21	(silver) Runner-up
2009	Malaysia Grand Prix Gold	(Malaysia) Wong Pei Tty	(China) Ma Jin (China) Wang Xiaoli	9–21, 11–21	(silver) Runner-up
2011	Australian Open	(Malaysia) Wong Pei Tty	(Japan) Shizuka Matsuo (Japan) Mami Naito	18–21, 11–21	(silver) Runner-up
2012	Malaysia Grand Prix Gold	(Malaysia) Wong Pei Tty	(Singapore) Shinta Mulia Sari (Singapore) Yao Lei	21–18, 21–18	(gold) Winner

BWF Grand Prix Gold tournament
BWF Grand Prix tournament

=== BWF International Challenge/Series ===
Women's doubles
Year	Tournament	Partner	Opponent	Score	Result
2001	Malaysia Satellite	(Malaysia) Wong Pei Tty	(China) Cheng Jiao (China) Li Yujia	5–7, 6–8, 3–7	(silver) Runner-up
2010	Malaysia International	(Malaysia) Lai Pei Jing	(Indonesia) Gebby Ristiyani Imawan (Indonesia) Tiara Rosalia Nuraidah	21–15, 21–10	(gold) Winner

BWF International Challenge tournament
BWF International Series tournament
