= Badminton at the 2014 Asian Games – Mixed doubles =

Mixed doubles at the 2014 Asian Games
- Venue: Gyeyang Gymnasium
- Dates: 25–29 September
- Competitors: 60 from 16 nations

Medalists
gold medal	Zhang Nan; Zhao Yunlei	China
silver medal	Tontowi Ahmad; Liliyana Natsir	Indonesia
bronze medal	Praveen Jordan; Debby Susanto	Indonesia
bronze medal	Xu Chen; Ma Jin	China

The badminton Mixed doubles tournament at the 2014 Asian Games in Incheon took place from 25 September to 29 September at Gyeyang Gymnasium.

== Schedule ==
All times are Korea Standard Time (UTC+09:00)

Date	Time	Event
Thursday, 25 September 2014	09:00	Round of 32
Friday, 26 September 2014	13:00	Round of 16
Saturday, 27 September 2014	13:00	Quarterfinals
Sunday, 28 September 2014	13:00	Semifinals
Monday, 29 September 2014	20:15	Gold medal match

== Results ==
Legend

- WO — Won by walkover

=== Final ===
Gold medal match
1	Zhang Nan (CHN); Zhao Yunlei (CHN)	21	21
3	Tontowi Ahmad (INA); Liliyana Natsir (INA)	16	14

=== Top half ===
Round of 32
Mohamed Ajfan Rasheed (MDV); Maisa Fathuhulla Ismail (MDV)
Kenichi Hayakawa (JPN); Misaki Matsutomo (JPN)	W	O
5	Sudket Prapakamol (THA); Saralee Thungthongkam (THA)	21	21
Đỗ Tuấn Đức (VIE); Lê Thu Huyền (VIE)	12	13
Lim Khim Wah (MAS); Lim Yin Loo (MAS)	19	19
Chen Hung-ling (TPE); Cheng Wen-hsing (TPE)	21	21
4	Ko Sung-hyun (KOR); Kim Ha-na (KOR)	21	21
Wan Wai Chi (MAC); Wong Kit Ieng (MAC)	6	6
Akshay Dewalkar (IND); Pradnya Gadre (IND)	20	21	13
Chayut Triyachart (SIN); Yao Lei (SIN)	22	17	21
7	Lee Chun Hei (HKG); Chau Hoi Wah (HKG)	21	21
Ratnajit Tamang (NEP); Sara Devi Tamang (NEP)	11	10
Irfan Saeed Bhatti (PAK); Palwasha Bashir (PAK)	13	3
Praveen Jordan (INA); Debby Susanto (INA)	21	21

Round of 16
1	Zhang Nan (CHN); Zhao Yunlei (CHN)	21	21
Kenichi Hayakawa (JPN); Misaki Matsutomo (JPN)	8	11
5	Sudket Prapakamol (THA); Saralee Thungthongkam (THA)	19	12
Chen Hung-ling (TPE); Cheng Wen-hsing (TPE)	21	21
4	Ko Sung-hyun (KOR); Kim Ha-na (KOR)	21	21
Chayut Triyachart (SIN); Yao Lei (SIN)	13	15
7	Lee Chun Hei (HKG); Chau Hoi Wah (HKG)	19	19
Praveen Jordan (INA); Debby Susanto (INA)	21	21

Quarterfinals
1	Zhang Nan (CHN); Zhao Yunlei (CHN)	21	21
Chen Hung-ling (TPE); Cheng Wen-hsing (TPE)	17	15
4	Ko Sung-hyun (KOR); Kim Ha-na (KOR)	9	21	15
Praveen Jordan (INA); Debby Susanto (INA)	21	9	21

Semifinals
1	Zhang Nan (CHN); Zhao Yunlei (CHN)	21	21
Praveen Jordan (INA); Debby Susanto (INA)	19	17

=== Bottom half ===
Round of 32
Wong Chi Chong (MAC); Ieong Pek San (MAC)	2	11
Shin Baek-cheol (KOR); Chang Ye-na (KOR)	21	21
Jargalsaikhany Gerelsükh (MGL); Baataryn Khulangoo (MGL)	8	12
8	Maneepong Jongjit (THA); Sapsiree Taerattanachai (THA)	21	21
Hirokatsu Hashimoto (JPN); Miyuki Maeda (JPN)	12	7
Chan Yun Lung (HKG); Tse Ying Suet (HKG)	21	21
Bikash Shrestha (NEP); Nangsal Tamang (NEP)	4	9
3	Tontowi Ahmad (INA); Liliyana Natsir (INA)	21	21
Manu Attri (IND); N. Sikki Reddy (IND)	21	21
Nasheeu Sharafuddeen (MDV); Aishath Afnaan Rasheed (MDV)	8	4
Chan Peng Soon (MAS); Ng Hui Lin (MAS)	15	21	15
6	Danny Bawa Chrisnanta (SIN); Vanessa Neo (SIN)	21	6	21
Liao Min-chun (TPE); Chen Hsiao-huan (TPE)	21	21
Umer Zeeshan (PAK); Mahoor Shahzad (PAK)	13	11

Round of 16
Shin Baek-cheol (KOR); Chang Ye-na (KOR)	16	21	21
8	Maneepong Jongjit (THA); Sapsiree Taerattanachai (THA)	21	11	18
Chan Yun Lung (HKG); Tse Ying Suet (HKG)	19	12
3	Tontowi Ahmad (INA); Liliyana Natsir (INA)	21	21
Manu Attri (IND); N. Sikki Reddy (IND)	18	23	15
6	Danny Bawa Chrisnanta (SIN); Vanessa Neo (SIN)	21	21	21
Liao Min-chun (TPE); Chen Hsiao-huan (TPE)	14	17
2	Xu Chen (CHN); Ma Jin (CHN)	21	21

Quarterfinals
Shin Baek-cheol (KOR); Chang Ye-na (KOR)	21	16	9
3	Tontowi Ahmad (INA); Liliyana Natsir (INA)	19	21	21
6	Danny Bawa Chrisnanta (SIN); Vanessa Neo (SIN)	12	15
2	Xu Chen (CHN); Ma Jin (CHN)	21	21

Semifinals
3	Tontowi Ahmad (INA); Liliyana Natsir (INA)	21	21
2	Xu Chen (CHN); Ma Jin (CHN)	12	10
