= 2013 BWF World Championships – Mixed doubles =

Mixed Doubles at the 2013 BWF World Championships
- Venue: Tianhe Sports Center
- Location: Guangzhou, China
- Dates: August 5, 2013 – August 11, 2013

Medalists
gold medal	Tontowi Ahmad; Lilyana Natsir	Indonesia
silver medal	Xu Chen; Ma Jin	China
bronze medal	Shin Baek-cheol; Eom Hye-won	South Korea
bronze medal	Zhang Nan; Zhao Yunlei	China

The mixed doubles tournament of the 2013 BWF World Championships (World Badminton Championships) was held from August 5 to 11. Zhang Nan and Zhao Yunlei were the defending champions.

Tontowi Ahmad and Lilyana Natsir defeated Xu Chen and Ma Jin 21–13, 16–21, 22–20 in the final.

== Seeds ==
1. (China) Xu Chen / Ma Jin (final)
2. (China) Zhang Nan / Zhao Yunlei (semifinals)
3. (Indonesia) Tantowi Ahmad / Lilyana Natsir (champion)
4. (Denmark) Joachim Fischer Nielsen / Christinna Pedersen (third round)
5. (Malaysia) Chan Peng Soon / Goh Liu Ying (second round)
6. (Indonesia) Muhammad Rijal / Debby Susanto (quarter-finals)
7. (Thailand) Sudket Prapakamol / Saralee Thoungthongkam (third round)
8. (Poland) Robert Mateusiak / Nadieżda Zięba (quarter-finals)

9. (Indonesia) Fran Kurniawan / Shendy Puspa Irawati (second round)
10. (Indonesia) Riky Widianto / Richi Puspita Dili (third round)
11. (South Korea) Yoo Yeon-seong / Jang Ye-na (quarter-finals)
12. (Germany) Michael Fuchs / Birgit Michels (second round)
13. (Denmark) Anders Kristiansen / Julie Houmann (second round)
14. (Singapore) Danny Bawa Chrisnanta / Vanessa Neo Yu Yan (second round)
15. (China) Qiu Zihan / Bao Yixin (second round)
16. (England) Chris Adcock / Gabrielle White (second round)

Click on the seed number of a player to go to their draw section.

== Draw ==
=== Finals ===
Quarterfinals
1	(China) Xu Chen (China) Ma Jin	21	21
8	(Poland) Robert Mateusiak (Poland) Nadieżda Zięba	4	4
(South Korea) Shin Baek-cheol (South Korea) Eom Hye-won	21	21
6	(Indonesia) Muhammad Rijal (Indonesia) Debby Susanto	9	15
(Japan) Kenichi Hayakawa (Japan) Misaki Matsutomo	10	21	19
3	(Indonesia) Tontowi Ahmad (Indonesia) Lilyana Natsir	21	17	21
11	(South Korea) Yoo Yeon-seong (South Korea) Jang Ye-na	12	20
2	(China) Zhang Nan (China) Zhao Yunlei	21	22

Semifinals
1	(China) Xu Chen (China) Ma Jin	21	21
(South Korea) Shin Baek-cheol (South Korea) Eom Hye-won	15	17
3	(Indonesia) Tontowi Ahmad (Indonesia) Lilyana Natsir	15	21	21
2	(China) Zhang Nan (China) Zhao Yunlei	21	18	13

Final
1	(China) Xu Chen (China) Ma Jin	13	21	20
3	(Indonesia) Tontowi Ahmad (Indonesia) Lilyana Natsir	21	16	22

=== Section 1 ===
First Round
(Hong Kong) Chan Yun Lung (Hong Kong) Tse Ying Suet	10	11
(Denmark) Mads Pieler Kolding (Denmark) Kamilla Rytter Juhl	21	21
(Malaysia) Tan Aik Quan (Malaysia) Lai Pei Jing	19	7
(China) Tao Jiaming (China) Tang Jinhua	21	21
(Republic of Ireland) Sam Magee (Republic of Ireland) Chloe Magee	15	12
(Netherlands) Jorrit de Ruiter (Netherlands) Samantha Barning	21	21
(Russia) Vitalij Durkin (Russia) Nina Vislova	21	21
(Belgium) Freek Golinski (Belgium) Severine Corvilain	9	7

Second Round
1	(China) Xu Chen (China) Ma Jin	18	21	21
(Denmark) Mads Pieler Kolding (Denmark) Kamilla Rytter Juhl	21	17	13
15	(China) Qiu Zihan (China) Bao Yixin	16	19
(China) Tao Jiaming (China) Tang Jinhua	21	21
8	(Poland) Robert Mateusiak (Poland) Nadieżda Zięba	21	22
(Netherlands) Jorrit de Ruiter (Netherlands) Samantha Barning	19	20
12	(Germany) Michael Fuchs (Germany) Birgit Michels	21	14	18
(Russia) Vitalij Durkin (Russia) Nina Vislova	13	21	21

Third Round
1	(China) Xu Chen (China) Ma Jin	21	21
(China) Tao Jiaming (China) Tang Jinhua	16	18
8	(Poland) Robert Mateusiak (Poland) Nadieżda Zięba	21	21
(Russia) Vitalij Durkin (Russia) Nina Vislova	18	15

Quarterfinals
1	(China) Xu Chen (China) Ma Jin	21	21
8	(Poland) Robert Mateusiak (Poland) Nadieżda Zięba	4	4

=== Section 2 ===
First Round
(Thailand) Songphon Anugritayawon (Thailand) Kunchala Voravichitchaikul
(Ukraine) Valeriy Atrashchenkov (Ukraine) Anna Kobceva	w/o
(South Korea) Shin Baek-cheol (South Korea) Eom Hye-won	21	21
(United States) Phillip Chew (United States) Jamie Subandhi	10	16
(Japan) Hirokatsu Hashimoto (Japan) Miyuki Maeda	21	12	21
(India) Tarun Kona (India) Ashwini Ponnappa	18	21	19
(Chinese Taipei) Chen Hung-ling (Chinese Taipei) Cheng Wen-hsing	21	21
(Mexico) Lino Munoz (Mexico) Cynthia Gonzalez	3	13

Second Round
4	(Denmark) Joachim Fischer Nielsen (Denmark) Christinna Pedersen	21	21
(Ukraine) Valeriy Atrashchenkov (Ukraine) Anna Kobceva	4	6
14	(Singapore) Danny Bawa Chrisnanta (Singapore) Vanessa Neo Yu Yan	19	13
(South Korea) Shin Baek-cheol (South Korea) Eom Hye-won	21	21
6	(Indonesia) Muhammad Rijal (Indonesia) Debby Susanto	10	21	21
(Japan) Hirokatsu Hashimoto (Japan) Miyuki Maeda	21	17	11
16	(England) Chris Adcock (England) Gabrielle White	18	16
(Chinese Taipei) Chen Hung-ling (Chinese Taipei) Cheng Wen-hsing	21	21

Third Round
4	(Denmark) Joachim Fischer Nielsen (Denmark) Christinna Pedersen	21	21	18
(South Korea) Shin Baek-cheol (South Korea) Eom Hye-won	17	23	21
6	(Indonesia) Muhammad Rijal (Indonesia) Debby Susanto	21	21
(Chinese Taipei) Chen Hung-ling (Chinese Taipei) Cheng Wen-hsing	13	13

Quarterfinals
(South Korea) Shin Baek-cheol (South Korea) Eom Hye-won	21	21
6	(Indonesia) Muhammad Rijal (Indonesia) Debby Susanto	9	15

=== Section 3 ===
First Round
(Czech Republic) Jakub Bitman (Czech Republic) Alzbeta Basova	16	11
(Japan) Kenichi Hayakawa (Japan) Misaki Matsutomo	21	21
(South Korea) Kim Ki-jung (South Korea) Jung Kyung-eun	21	21
(Germany) Max Schwenger (Germany) Carla Nelte	9	14
(Hong Kong) Lee Chun Hei (Hong Kong) Chau Hoi Wah	21	21
(Ukraine) Gennadiy Natarov (Ukraine) Yuliya Kazarinova	9	9
(Malaysia) Ong Jian Guo (Malaysia) Lim Yin Loo	21	21
(Germany) Peter Kaesbauer (Germany) Isabel Herttrich	14	15

Second Round
(Japan) Kenichi Hayakawa (Japan) Misaki Matsutomo	21	21
13	(Denmark) Anders Kristiansen (Denmark) Julie Houmann	7	19
(South Korea) Kim Ki-jung (South Korea) Jung Kyung-eun	21	21
5	(Malaysia) Chan Peng Soon (Malaysia) Goh Liu Ying	18	19
(Hong Kong) Lee Chun Hei (Hong Kong) Chau Hoi Wah	21	21
9	(Indonesia) Fran Kurniawan (Indonesia) Shendy Puspa Irawati	18	17
(Malaysia) Ong Jian Guo (Malaysia) Lim Yin Loo	14	11
3	(Indonesia) Tantowi Ahmad (Indonesia) Lilyana Natsir	21	21

Third Round
(Japan) Kenichi Hayakawa (Japan) Misaki Matsutomo	21	11	21
(South Korea) Kim Ki-jung (South Korea) Jung Kyung-eun	16	21	11
(Hong Kong) Lee Chun Hei (Hong Kong) Chau Hoi Wah	23	15	14
3	(Indonesia) Tantowi Ahmad (Indonesia) Lilyana Natsir	21	21	21

Quarterfinals
(Japan) Kenichi Hayakawa (Japan) Misaki Matsutomo	10	21	19
3	(Indonesia) Tantowi Ahmad (Indonesia) Lilyana Natsir	21	17	21

=== Section 4 ===
First Round
(Sweden) Nico Ruponen (Sweden) Amanda Hogstrom	22	13	21
(England) Chris Langridge (England) Heather Olver	20	21	13
(Egypt) Mahmoud El Sayad (Egypt) Nadine Ashraf	18	16
(New Zealand) Oliver Leydon-Davis (New Zealand) Susannah Leydon-Davis	21	21
(Chinese Taipei) Liao Min-chun (Chinese Taipei) Chen Hsiao-huan	21	21
(India) Arun Vishnu (India) Aparna Balan	16	16
(Switzerland) Anthony Dumartheray (Switzerland) Sabrina Jaquet	21	21
(Russia) Sergey Lunev (Russia) Evgenia Dimova	12	17

Second Round
(Sweden) Nico Ruponen (Sweden) Amanda Hogstrom	17	17
11	(South Korea) Yoo Yeon-seong (South Korea) Jang Ye-na	21	21
(New Zealand) Oliver Leydon-Davis (New Zealand) Susannah Leydon-Davis	8	11
7	(Thailand) Sudket Prapakamol (Thailand) Saralee Thoungthongkam	21	21
(Chinese Taipei) Liao Min-chun (Chinese Taipei) Chen Hsiao-huan	8	20
10	(Indonesia) Riky Widianto (Indonesia) Richi Puspita Dili	21	22
(Switzerland) Anthony Dumartheray (Switzerland) Sabrina Jaquet	11	15
2	(China) Zhang Nan (China) Zhao Yunlei	21	21

Third Round
11	(South Korea) Yoo Yeon-seong (South Korea) Jang Ye-na	21	21
7	(Thailand) Sudket Prapakamol (Thailand) Saralee Thoungthongkam	14	13
10	(Indonesia) Riky Widianto (Indonesia) Richi Puspita Dili	14	17
2	(China) Zhang Nan (China) Zhao Yunlei	21	21

Quarterfinals
11	(South Korea) Yoo Yeon-seong (South Korea) Jang Ye-na	12	20
2	(China) Zhang Nan (China) Zhao Yunlei	21	22
