= Eom Hye-won =

South Korean badminton player (born 1991)

Personal information
- Born: 8 September 1991 (age 35) Gyeonggi-do, South Korea
- Height: 1.64 m (5 ft 5 in)

Sport
- Country: South Korea
- Sport: Badminton
- Handedness: Right

Women's & mixed doubles
- Highest ranking: 5 (WD 19 September 2013); 12 (XD 29 September 2016)
- Current ranking: 110 (WD with Kim Bo-ryeong), 16 (XD with Ko Sung-hyun) (29 November 2022)
- BWF profile
Medal record
Women's badminton
Representing South Korea
World Championships
Silver medal – second place	2013 Guangzhou	Women's doubles
Bronze medal – third place	2013 Guangzhou	Mixed doubles
Uber Cup
Silver medal – second place	2012 Wuhan	Women's team
Asian Championships
Bronze medal – third place	2012 Qingdao	Mixed doubles
East Asian Games
Bronze medal – third place	2009 Hong Kong	Women's team
Summer Universiade
Gold medal – first place	2011 Shenzhen	Women's doubles
Gold medal – first place	2011 Shenzhen	Mixed doubles
World Junior Championships
Silver medal – second place	2007 Waitakere City	Mixed team
Silver medal – second place	2008 Pune	Mixed team
Bronze medal – third place	2008 Pune	Mixed doubles
Asian Junior Championships
Silver medal – second place	2008 Kuala Lumpur	Mixed doubles
Silver medal – second place	2008 Kuala Lumpur	Mixed team

- Eom Hye-won
- Hangul: 엄혜원
- Hanja: 嚴惠媛
- RR: Eom Hyewon
- MR: Ŏm Hyewŏn

Eom Hye-won (Korean: 엄혜원; born 8 September 1991) is a South Korean badminton player who specializes in doubles. She became a national representative since 2004, and was selected to join the national team in 2008. As a member of the Korea National Sport University team, she was awarded as the best player by the Badminton Korea Association in 2011.

== Career ==
In 2008, she won a bronze medal at the World Junior Championships in the mixed doubles event partnered with Kim Gi-jung. She came to international prominence playing women's doubles with Chang Ye-na, with whom she reached the finals of the 2013 BWF World Championships, but Badminton Korea Association decided to let her concentrate on playing mixed doubles for the subsequent Asian Games, in Incheon, Korea.

== Achievements ==
=== BWF World Championships ===
Women's doubles
Year	Venue	Partner	Opponent	Score	Result
2013	Tianhe Sports Center; Guangzhou, China	(South Korea) Jang Ye-na	(China) Wang Xiaoli (China) Yu Yang	14–21, 21–18, 8–21	Silver

Mixed doubles
Year	Venue	Partner	Opponent	Score	Result
2013	Tianhe Sports Center; Guangzhou, China	(South Korea) Shin Baek-cheol	(China) Xu Chen (China) Ma Jin	15–21, 17–21	Bronze

=== Asian Championships ===
Mixed doubles
Year	Venue	Partner	Opponent	Score	Result
2012	Qingdao Sports Centre Conson Stadium; Qingdao, China	(South Korea) Kang Ji-wook	(China) Xu Chen (China) Ma Jin	14–21, 12–21	Bronze

=== Summer Universiade ===
Women's doubles
Year	Venue	Partner	Opponent	Score	Result
2011	Gymnasium of SZIIT; Shenzhen, China	(South Korea) Chang Ye-na	(Chinese Taipei) Cheng Shao-chieh (Chinese Taipei) Pai Hsiao-ma	21–11, 21–14	Gold

Mixed doubles
Year	Venue	Partner	Opponent	Score	Result
2011	Gymnasium of SZIIT; Shenzhen, China	(South Korea) Shin Baek-choel	(Chinese Taipei) Lee Sheng-mu (Chinese Taipei) Hsieh Pei-chen	15–21, 21–11, 21–19	Gold

=== BWF World Junior Championships ===
Mixed doubles
Year	Venue	Partner	Opponent	Score	Result
2008	Shree Shiv Chhatrapati Badminton Hall; Pune, India	(South Korea) Kim Gi-jung	(China) Chai Biao (China) Xie Jing	13–21, 19–21	Bronze

=== Asian Junior Championships ===
Mixed doubles
Year	Venue	Partner	Opponent	Score	Result
2008	Stadium Juara; Kuala Lumpur, Malaysia	(South Korea) Kim Gi-jung	(China) Zhang Nan (China) Lu Lu	21–14, 15–21, 22–24	Silver

=== BWF World Tour (3 titles, 1 runner-up) ===
The BWF World Tour, which was announced on 19 March 2017 and implemented in 2018, is a series of elite badminton tournaments sanctioned by the Badminton World Federation (BWF). The BWF World Tour is divided into levels of World Tour Finals, Super 1000, Super 750, Super 500, Super 300, and the BWF Tour Super 100.

Mixed doubles
Year	Tournament	Level	Partner	Opponent	Score	Result
2018	Korea Masters	Super 300	(South Korea) Ko Sung-hyun	(South Korea) Choi Sol-gyu (South Korea) Shin Seung-chan	21–12, 15–21, 21–18	(gold) Winner
2019	Canada Open	Super 100	(South Korea) Ko Sung-hyun	(China) Guo Xinwa (China) Zhang Shuxian	21–19, 21–19	(gold) Winner
2019	Akita Masters	Super 100	(South Korea) Ko Sung-hyun	(Japan) Kyohei Yamashita (Japan) Naru Shinoya	21–10, 21–17	(gold) Winner
2022	Korea Open	Super 500	(South Korea) Ko Sung-hyun	(Malaysia) Tan Kian Meng (Malaysia) Lai Pei Jing	15–21, 18–21	(silver) Runner-up

=== BWF Superseries (3 runners-up) ===
The BWF Superseries, which was launched on 14 December 2006 and implemented in 2007, was a series of elite badminton tournaments, sanctioned by the Badminton World Federation (BWF). BWF Superseries levels were Superseries and Superseries Premier. A season of Superseries consisted of twelve tournaments around the world that had been introduced since 2011. Successful players were invited to the Superseries Finals, which were held at the end of each year.

Mixed doubles
Year	Tournament	Partner	Opponent	Score	Result
2013	Singapore Open	(South Korea) Yoo Yeon-seong	(Indonesia) Tontowi Ahmad (Indonesia) Liliyana Natsir	12–21, 12–21	(silver) Runner-up
2013	China Masters	(South Korea) Yoo Yeon-seong	(China) Zhang Nan (China) Zhao Yunlei	18–21, 12–21	(silver) Runner-up
2014	China Open	(South Korea) Yoo Yeon-seong	(China) Zhang Nan (China) Zhao Yunlei	25–23, 14–21, 18–21	(silver) Runner-up

BWF Super Series Finals tournament
BWF Super Series Premier tournament
BWF Super Series tournament

=== BWF Grand Prix (7 titles, 7 runners-up) ===
The BWF Grand Prix had two levels, the Grand Prix and Grand Prix Gold. It was a series of badminton tournaments sanctioned by the Badminton World Federation (BWF) and played between 2007 and 2017.

Women's doubles
Year	Tournament	Partner	Opponent	Score	Result
2010	Korea Grand Prix	(South Korea) Kim Ha-na	(South Korea) Jung Kyung-eun (South Korea) Yoo Hyun-young	16–21, 21–18, 19–21	(silver) Runner-up
2011	Macau Open	(South Korea) Jang Ye-na	(South Korea) Jung Kyung-eun (South Korea) Kim Ha-na	4–8 retired	(silver) Runner-up
2011	Korea Grand Prix Gold	(South Korea) Jang Ye-na	(Singapore) Shinta Mulia Sari (Singapore) Yao Lei	21–15, 21–16	(gold) Winner
2012	Indonesia Grand Prix Gold	(South Korea) Jang Ye-na	(Japan) Misaki Matsutomo (Japan) Ayaka Takahashi	12–21,21–12, 13–21	(silver) Runner-up
2012	Macau Open	(South Korea) Jang Ye-na	(South Korea) Choi Hye-in (South Korea) Kim So-young	21–18, 21–16	(gold) Winner
2012	Korea Grand Prix Gold	(South Korea) Jang Ye-na	(South Korea) Lee So-hee (South Korea) Shin Seung-chan	21–13, 21–17	(gold) Winner

Mixed doubles
Year	Tournament	Partner	Opponent	Score	Result
2010	Korea Grand Prix	(South Korea) Choi Young-woo	(South Korea) Yoo Yeon-seong (South Korea) Kim Min-jung	15–21, 13–21	(silver) Runner-up
2011	Chinese Taipei Open	(South Korea) Ko Sung-hyun	(Indonesia) Tantowi Ahmad (Indonesia) Liliyana Natsir	24–22, 16–21, 21–17	(gold) Winner
2012	Korea Grand Prix Gold	(South Korea) Shin Baek-choel	(South Korea) Yoo Yeon-seong (South Korea) Jang Ye-na	11–21, 21–18, 25–23	(gold) Winner
2013	Chinese Taipei Open	(South Korea) Yoo Yeon-seong	(South Korea) Shin Baek-cheol (South Korea) Jang Ye-na	20–22, 21–12, 16–21	(silver) Runner-up
2015	Thailand Open	(South Korea) Choi Sol-gyu	(Indonesia) Praveen Jordan (Indonesia) Debby Susanto	21–19, 17–21, 21–16	(gold) Winner
2015	Macau Open	(South Korea) Choi Sol-gyu	(South Korea) Shin Baek-cheol (South Korea) Chae Yoo-jung	18–21, 13–21	(silver) Runner-up
2015	U.S. Grand Prix	(South Korea) Choi Sol-gyu	(Germany) Michael Fuchs (Germany) Birgit Michels	21–12, 21–14	(gold) Winner
2015	Mexico City Grand Prix	(South Korea) Choi Sol-gyu	(Malaysia) Chan Peng Soon (Malaysia) Goh Liu Ying	14–21, 12–21	(silver) Runner-up

BWF Grand Prix Gold tournament
BWF Grand Prix tournament

=== BWF International Challenge/Series (1 title, 1 runner-up) ===
Mixed doubles
Year	Tournament	Partner	Opponent	Score	Result
2015	Osaka International	(South Korea) Kim Duk-young	(China) Liu Yuchen (China) Huang Dongping	21–17, 16–21, 21–17	(gold) Winner
2019	Italian International	(South Korea) Kim Sa-rang	(Russia) Vladimir Ivanov (Russia) Ekaterina Bolotova	12–21, 21–18, 15–21	(silver) Runner-up

BWF International Challenge tournament
BWF International Series tournament
