= Tontowi Ahmad =

Indonesian badminton player (born 1987)

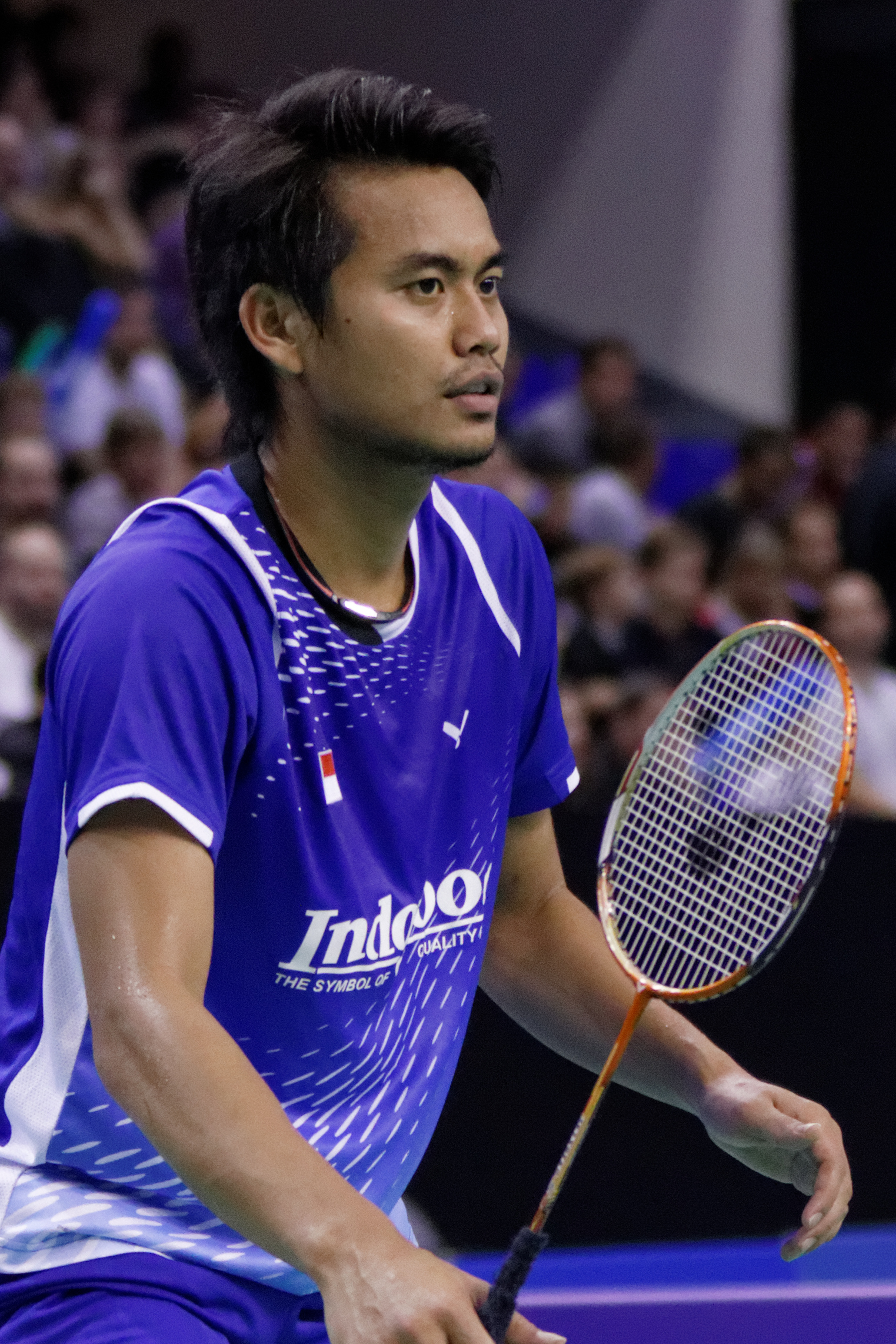
- Tontowi Ahmad at the 2013 French Open Superseries

Personal information
- Nickname: Owi
- Born: 18 July 1987 (age 39) Banyumas, Central Java, Indonesia
- Height: 1.83 m (6 ft 0 in)
- Weight: 75 kg (165 lb)
- Spouse: Michelle Harminc (m. 2014)

Sport
- Country: Indonesia
- Sport: Badminton
- Handedness: Right
- Coached by: Richard Mainaky
- Retired: 18 May 2020

Mixed doubles
- Highest ranking: 1 (XD with Liliyana Natsir 3 May 2018); 15 (XD with Winny Oktavina Kandow 24 September 2019); 261 (XD with Apriyani Rahayu 17 March 2020)
- BWF profile
Medal record
Men's badminton
Representing Indonesia
Olympic Games
Gold medal – first place	2016 Rio de Janeiro	Mixed doubles
World Championships
Gold medal – first place	2013 Guangzhou	Mixed doubles
Gold medal – first place	2017 Glasgow	Mixed doubles
Bronze medal – third place	2011 London	Mixed doubles
Bronze medal – third place	2015 Jakarta	Mixed doubles
Sudirman Cup
Bronze medal – third place	2011 Qingdao	Mixed team
Bronze medal – third place	2015 Dongguan	Mixed team
Asian Games
Silver medal – second place	2014 Incheon	Mixed doubles
Silver medal – second place	2018 Jakarta–Palembang	Men's team
Bronze medal – third place	2010 Guangzhou	Men's team
Bronze medal – third place	2018 Jakarta–Palembang	Mixed doubles
Asian Championships
Gold medal – first place	2015 Wuhan	Mixed doubles
Silver medal – second place	2016 Wuhan	Mixed doubles
Silver medal – second place	2018 Wuhan	Mixed doubles
Asia Mixed Team Championships
Bronze medal – third place	2019 Hong Kong	Mixed team
SEA Games
Gold medal – first place	2011 Jakarta–Palembang	Mixed doubles
Gold medal – first place	2011 Jakarta–Palembang	Men's team
Summer Universiade
Bronze medal – third place	2007 Bangkok	Mixed team
Asian Junior Championships
Bronze medal – third place	2005 Jakarta	Boys' team

Tontowi Ahmad (born 18 July 1987) is a retired Indonesian badminton player. He plays for PB. Djarum, a badminton club in Kudus, Central Java and joined the club in 2005. Tontowi Ahmad rose to prominence in the world badminton in 2010 when he paired with the established mixed doubles star Liliyana Natsir. With Natsir he won the 2016 Olympic gold medal in the mixed doubles category.

== Career ==
=== Olympic Games ===
Ahmad made his debut at the Olympic Games in 2012 London. He competed in the mixed doubles event with partner Liliyana Natsir and finished fourth.

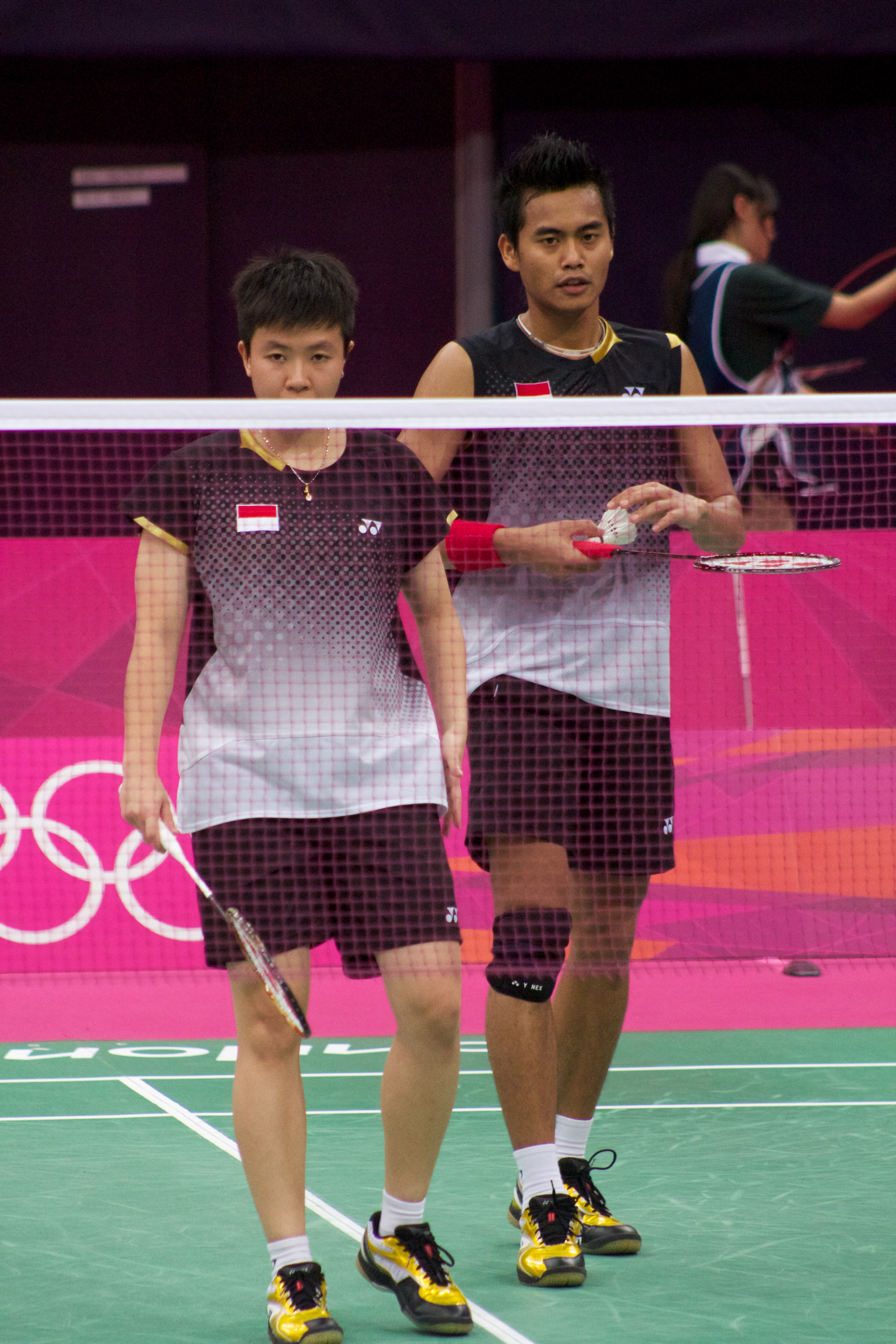
Ahmad and Natsir at the 2012 Summer Olympics

2012 Summer Olympics – Mixed doubles
Round	Partner	Opponent	Score	Result
Group stage	(Indonesia) Liliyana Natsir	(India) Valiyaveetil Diju (India) Jwala Gutta	21–16, 21–12	Win
Group stage	(Indonesia) Liliyana Natsir	(South Korea) Lee Yong-dae (South Korea) Ha Jung-eun	21–19, 21–12	Win
Group stage	(Indonesia) Liliyana Natsir	(Denmark) Thomas Laybourn (Denmark) Kamilla Rytter Juhl	24–22, 21–16	Win
Quarterfinal	(Indonesia) Liliyana Natsir	(Germany) Michael Fuchs (Germany) Birgit Michels	21–15, 21–9	Win
Semifinal	(Indonesia) Liliyana Natsir	(China) Xu Chen [2] (China) Ma Jin	21–16, 18–21, 13–21	Lost
Bronze-final	(Indonesia) Liliyana Natsir	(Denmark) Joachim Fischer Nielsen [3] (Denmark) Christinna Pedersen	12–21, 12–21	Lost (4th)

Ahmad made his second appearances at the Olympic Games in 2016 Rio. Paired with Liliyana Natsir, the duo won the gold medal at the end after beating Chan Peng Soon and Goh Liu Ying of Malaysia. Ahmad and Natsir won all of their matches in straight sets, including against the current no. 1-ranked Zhang Nan and Zhao Yunlei.

2016 Summer Olympics – Mixed doubles
Round	Partner	Opponent	Score	Result
Group stage	(Indonesia) Liliyana Natsir	(Australia) Robin Middleton (Australia) Leanne Choo	21–7, 21–8	Win
Group stage	(Indonesia) Liliyana Natsir	(Thailand) Bodin Issara (Thailand) Savitree Amitrapai	21–11, 21–13	Win
Group stage	(Indonesia) Liliyana Natsir	(Malaysia) Chan Peng Soon (Malaysia) Goh Liu Ying	21–15, 21–11	Win
Quarterfinal	(Indonesia) Liliyana Natsir	(Indonesia) Praveen Jordan (Indonesia) Debby Susanto	21–16, 21–11	Win
Semifinal	(Indonesia) Liliyana Natsir	(China) Zhang Nan [1] (China) Zhao Yunlei	21–16, 21–15	Win
Final	(Indonesia) Liliyana Natsir	(Malaysia) Chan Peng Soon (Malaysia) Goh Liu Ying	21–14, 21–12	Gold

== Awards ==
Award	Year	Category	Result	Ref.
BWF Awards	2016	Golden Shuttle Award with Liliyana Natsir	Won	
Golden Award SIWO PWI	2017	Best of the Best with Liliyana Natsir	Won	
Golden Award SIWO PWI	2019	Favorite Team with 2018 Asian Games men's badminton team	Nominated	
Indonesian Sport Awards	2018	Favorite Mixed Pair with Liliyana Natsir	Won	
iNews Maker Award	2017	Best Athlete with Liliyana Natsir	Won	
KONI Award	2013	Best Athlete with Liliyana Natsir	Won	
Nickelodeon Indonesia Kids' Choice Awards	2014	Favorite Athlete with Liliyana Natsir	Won	
Nickelodeon Indonesia Kids' Choice Awards	2016	Favorite Athlete with Liliyana Natsir	Nominated	
Seputar Indonesia Awards	2012	Arena Star with Liliyana Natsir	Nominated	
Seputar Indonesia Awards	2013	Arena Star with Liliyana Natsir	Nominated	
Seputar Indonesia Awards	2014	Arena Star with Liliyana Natsir	Won	
Seputar Indonesia Awards	2016	Arena Star with Liliyana Natsir	Nominated	

== Achievements ==
=== Olympic Games ===
Mixed doubles
Year	Venue	Partner	Opponent	Score	Result
2016	Riocentro - Pavilion 4 Rio de Janeiro, Brazil	(Indonesia) Liliyana Natsir	(Malaysia) Chan Peng Soon (Malaysia) Goh Liu Ying	21–14, 21–12	Gold

=== BWF World Championships ===
Mixed doubles
Year	Venue	Partner	Opponent	Score	Result
2011	Wembley Arena; London, England	(Indonesia) Liliyana Natsir	(England) Chris Adcock (Scotland) Imogen Bankier	16–21, 19–21	Bronze
2013	Tianhe Sports Center; Guangzhou, China	(Indonesia) Liliyana Natsir	(China) Xu Chen (China) Ma Jin	21–13, 16–21, 22–20	Gold
2015	Istora Gelora Bung Karno; Jakarta, Indonesia	(Indonesia) Liliyana Natsir	(China) Zhang Nan (China) Zhao Yunlei	22–20, 21–23, 12–21	Bronze
2017	Emirates Arena; Glasgow, Scotland	(Indonesia) Liliyana Natsir	(China) Zheng Siwei (China) Chen Qingchen	15–21, 21–16, 21–15	Gold

=== Asian Games ===
Mixed doubles
Year	Venue	Partner	Opponent	Score	Result
2014	Gyeyang Gymnasium; Incheon, South Korea	(Indonesia) Liliyana Natsir	(China) Zhang Nan (China) Zhao Yunlei	16–21, 14–21	Silver
2018	Istora Gelora Bung Karno; Jakarta, Indonesia	(Indonesia) Liliyana Natsir	(China) Zheng Siwei (China) Huang Yaqiong	13–21, 18–21	Bronze

=== Asian Championships ===
Mixed doubles
Year	Venue	Partner	Opponent	Score	Result
2015	Wuhan Sports Center Gymnasium; Wuhan, China	(Indonesia) Liliyana Natsir	(Hong Kong) Lee Chun Hei (Hong Kong) Chau Hoi Wah	21–16, 21–15	Gold
2016	Wuhan Sports Center Gymnasium, Wuhan, China	(Indonesia) Liliyana Natsir	(China) Zhang Nan (China) Zhao Yunlei	21–16, 9–21, 17–21	Silver
2018	Wuhan Sports Center Gymnasium, Wuhan, China	(Indonesia) Liliyana Natsir	(China) Wang Yilyu (China) Huang Dongping	17–21, 17–21	Silver

=== SEA Games ===
Mixed doubles
Year	Venue	Partner	Opponent	Score	Result
2011	Istora Gelora Bung Karno; Jakarta, Indonesia	(Indonesia) Liliyana Natsir	(Thailand) Sudket Prapakamol (Thailand) Saralee Thungthongkam	21–7, 21–14	Gold

=== BWF World Tour (1 title, 3 runners-up) ===
The BWF World Tour, which was announced on 19 March 2017 and implemented in 2018, is a series of elite badminton tournaments sanctioned by the Badminton World Federation (BWF). The BWF World Tour is divided into levels of World Tour Finals, Super 1000, Super 750, Super 500, Super 300 (part of the HSBC World Tour), and the BWF Tour Super 100.

Mixed doubles
Year	Tournament	Level	Partner	Opponent	Score	Result
2018	Indonesia Masters	Super 500	(Indonesia) Liliyana Natsir	(China) Zheng Siwei (China) Huang Yaqiong	14–21, 11–21	(silver) Runner-up
2018	Indonesia Open	Super 1000	(Indonesia) Liliyana Natsir	(Malaysia) Chan Peng Soon (Malaysia) Goh Liu Ying	21–17, 21–8	(gold) Winner
2018	Singapore Open	Super 500	(Indonesia) Liliyana Natsir	(Malaysia) Goh Soon Huat (Malaysia) Shevon Jemie Lai	19–21, 18–21	(silver) Runner-up
2019	Indonesia Masters	Super 500	(Indonesia) Liliyana Natsir	(China) Zheng Siwei (China) Huang Yaqiong	21–19, 19–21, 16–21	(silver) Runner-up

=== BWF Superseries (16 titles, 8 runners-up) ===
The BWF Superseries, which was launched on 14 December 2006 and implemented in 2007, is a series of elite badminton tournaments, sanctioned by the Badminton World Federation (BWF). BWF Superseries levels are Superseries and Superseries Premier. A season of Superseries consists of twelve tournaments around the world that have been introduced since 2011. Successful players are invited to the Superseries Finals, which are held at the end of each year.

Mixed doubles
Year	Tournament	Partner	Opponent	Score	Result
2011	India Open	(Indonesia) Liliyana Natsir	(Indonesia) Fran Kurniawan (Indonesia) Pia Zebadiah Bernadet	21–18, 23–21	(gold) Winner
2011	Singapore Open	(Indonesia) Liliyana Natsir	(Chinese Taipei) Chen Hung-ling (Chinese Taipei) Cheng Wen-hsing	21–14, 27–25	(gold) Winner
2011	Indonesia Open	(Indonesia) Liliyana Natsir	(China) Zhang Nan (China) Zhao Yunlei	22–20, 14–21, 9–21	(silver) Runner-up
2012	All England Open	(Indonesia) Liliyana Natsir	(Denmark) Thomas Laybourn (Denmark) Kamilla Rytter Juhl	21–17, 21–19	(gold) Winner
2012	India Open	(Indonesia) Liliyana Natsir	(Thailand) Sudket Prapakamol (Thailand) Saralee Thungthongkam	21–16, 12–21, 21–14	(gold) Winner
2012	Indonesia Open	(Indonesia) Liliyana Natsir	(Thailand) Sudket Prapakamol (Thailand) Saralee Thungthongkam	17–21, 21–17, 13–21	(silver) Runner-up
2012	Denmark Open	(Indonesia) Liliyana Natsir	(China) Xu Chen (China) Ma Jin	21–23, 26–24, 11–21	(silver) Runner-up
2013	All England Open	(Indonesia) Liliyana Natsir	(China) Zhang Nan (China) Zhao Yunlei	21–13, 21–17	(gold) Winner
2013	India Open	(Indonesia) Liliyana Natsir	(South Korea) Ko Sung-hyun (South Korea) Kim Ha-na	21–16, 21–13	(gold) Winner
2013	Singapore Open	(Indonesia) Liliyana Natsir	(South Korea) Yoo Yeon-seong (South Korea) Eom Hye-won	21–12, 21–12	(gold) Winner
2013	Denmark Open	(Indonesia) Liliyana Natsir	(China) Zhang Nan (China) Zhao Yunlei	11–21, 20–22	(silver) Runner-up
2013	China Open	(Indonesia) Liliyana Natsir	(Denmark) Joachim Fischer Nielsen (Denmark) Christinna Pedersen	21–10, 5–21, 21–17	(gold) Winner
2014	All England Open	(Indonesia) Liliyana Natsir	(China) Zhang Nan (China) Zhao Yunlei	21–13, 21–17	(gold) Winner
2014	Singapore Open	(Indonesia) Liliyana Natsir	(Indonesia) Riky Widianto (Indonesia) Richi Puspita Dili	21–15, 22–20	(gold) Winner
2014	Denmark Open	(Indonesia) Liliyana Natsir	(China) Xu Chen (China) Ma Jin	20–22, 15–21	(silver) Runner-up
2014	French Open	(Indonesia) Liliyana Natsir	(England) Chris Adcock (England) Gabby Adcock	21–9, 21–16	(gold) Winner
2015	All England Open	(Indonesia) Liliyana Natsir	(China) Zhang Nan (China) Zhao Yunlei	10–21, 10–21	(silver) Runner-up
2015	Korea Open	(Indonesia) Liliyana Natsir	(China) Zhang Nan (China) Zhao Yunlei	16–21, 15–21	(silver) Runner-up
2015	Denmark Open	(Indonesia) Liliyana Natsir	(South Korea) Ko Sung-hyun (South Korea) Kim Ha-na	22–20, 18–21, 9–21	(silver) Runner-up
2016	Malaysia Open	(Indonesia) Liliyana Natsir	(Malaysia) Chan Peng Soon (Malaysia) Goh Liu Ying	23–21, 13–21, 21–16	(gold) Winner
2016	China Open	(Indonesia) Liliyana Natsir	(China) Zhang Nan (China) Li Yinhui	21–13, 22–24, 21–16	(gold) Winner
2016	Hong Kong Open	(Indonesia) Liliyana Natsir	(Indonesia) Praveen Jordan (Indonesia) Debby Susanto	21–19, 21–17	(gold) Winner
2017	Indonesia Open	(Indonesia) Liliyana Natsir	(China) Zheng Siwei (China) Chen Qingchen	22–20, 21–15	(gold) Winner
2017	French Open	(Indonesia) Liliyana Natsir	(China) Zheng Siwei (China) Chen Qingchen	22–20, 21–15	(gold) Winner

BWF Super Series Finals tournament
BWF Super Series Premier tournament
BWF Super Series tournament

=== BWF Grand Prix (10 titles, 3 runners-up) ===
The BWF Grand Prix had two levels, the BWF Grand Prix and Grand Prix Gold. It was a series of badminton tournaments sanctioned by the Badminton World Federation (BWF) which was held from 2007 to 2017.

Mixed doubles
Year	Tournament	Partner	Opponent	Score	Result
2007	Vietnam Open	(Indonesia) Yulianti	(Hong Kong) Hui Wai Ho (Hong Kong) Chau Hoi Wah	21–11, 21–13	(gold) Winner
2008	Vietnam Open	(Indonesia) Shendy Puspa Irawati	(Singapore) Riky Widianto (Singapore) Vanessa Neo	21–17, 21–9	(gold) Winner
2010	Macau Open	(Indonesia) Liliyana Natsir	(Indonesia) Hendra Aprida Gunawan (Indonesia) Vita Marissa	21–14, 21–18	(gold) Winner
2010	Chinese Taipei Open	(Indonesia) Liliyana Natsir	(Indonesia) Hendra Aprida Gunawan (Indonesia) Vita Marissa	20–22, 21–14, 20–22	(silver) Runner-up
2010	Indonesia Grand Prix Gold	(Indonesia) Liliyana Natsir	(Indonesia) Markis Kido (Indonesia) Lita Nurlita	21–11, 21–13	(gold) Winner
2011	Malaysia Grand Prix Gold	(Indonesia) Liliyana Natsir	(Malaysia) Chan Peng Soon (Malaysia) Goh Liu Ying	18–21, 21–15, 21–19	(gold) Winner
2011	Chinese Taipei Open	(Indonesia) Liliyana Natsir	(South Korea) Ko Sung-hyun (South Korea) Eom Hye-won	22–24, 21–16, 17–21	(silver) Runner-up
2011	Macau Open	(Indonesia) Liliyana Natsir	(Chinese Taipei) Chen Hung-ling (Chinese Taipei) Cheng Wen-hsing	Walkover	(gold) Winner
2012	Swiss Open	(Indonesia) Liliyana Natsir	(Thailand) Sudket Prapakamol (Thailand) Saralee Thungthongkam	21–16, 21–14	(gold) Winner
2012	Indonesia Grand Prix Gold	(Indonesia) Liliyana Natsir	(Indonesia) Muhammad Rijal (Indonesia) Debby Susanto	21–19, 21–14	(gold) Winner
2012	Macau Open	(Indonesia) Liliyana Natsir	(Indonesia) Muhammad Rijal (Indonesia) Debby Susanto	21–16, 14–21, 21–16	(gold) Winner
2013	Indonesia Grand Prix Gold	(Indonesia) Liliyana Natsir	(Indonesia) Praveen Jordan (Indonesia) Vita Marissa	20–22, 21–9, 14–21	(silver) Runner-up
2015	Indonesian Masters	(Indonesia) Liliyana Natsir	(Indonesia) Praveen Jordan (Indonesia) Debby Susanto	21–18, 21–13	(gold) Winner

BWF Grand Prix Gold tournament
BWF Grand Prix tournament

=== BWF International Challenge/Series/Satellite (3 titles, 3 runners-up) ===
Mixed doubles
Year	Tournament	Partner	Opponent	Score	Result
2006	Malaysia Satellite	(Indonesia) Yulianti	(South Korea) Shin Baek-cheol (South Korea) Kim Min-jung	16–21, 14–21	(silver) Runner-up
2006	Cheers Asian Satellite	(Indonesia) Yulianti	(Indonesia) Lingga Lie (Indonesia) Devi Tika Permatasari	17–21, 22–24	(silver) Runner-up
2007	Smiling Fish International	(Indonesia) Yulianti	(Thailand) Thitipong Lapho (Thailand) Savitree Amitrapai	21–17, 17–21, 21–17	(gold) Winner
2007	Vietnam International	(Indonesia) Yulianti	(Indonesia) Tri Kusharyanto (Indonesia) Yunita Tetty	15–21, 17–21	(silver) Runner-up
2007	Indonesia International	(Indonesia) Yulianti	(South Korea) Yoo Yeon-seong (South Korea) Kim Min-jung	21–16, 15–21, 21–9	(gold) Winner
2009	Vietnam International	(Indonesia) Richi Puspita Dili	(Indonesia) Fran Kurniawan (Indonesia) Pia Zebadiah Bernadet	21–14, 21–8	(gold) Winner

BWF International Challenge tournament
BWF International Series tournament

=== Invitational tournament ===
Mixed doubles
Year	Tournament	Partner	Opponent	Score	Result	Ref.
2014	Glory to the King	(Indonesia) Liliyana Natsir	(Thailand) Songphon Anugritayawon (Thailand) Kunchala Voravichitchaikul	21–13, 17–21, 21–17	(gold) Winner	

== Performance timeline ==
=== National team ===
- Junior level

Team event	2005
Asian Junior Championships	B

- Senior level

Team events	2007	2008	2009	2010	2011	2012	2013	2014	2015	2016	2017	2018	2019
Summer Universiade	B	NH			A	NH	A	NH	A	NH	A	NH	
Southeast Asian Games	A	NH	A	NH	G	NH			A	NH	A	NH	A
Asia Mixed Team Championships	NH										A	NH	B
Asian Games	NH			B	NH			QF	NH			S	NH
Sudirman Cup	A	NH	A	NH	B	NH	B	NH	B	NH	RR	NH	DNP

=== Individual competitions ===
- Senior level

Events	2008	2009	2010	2011	2012	2013	2014	2015	2016	2017	2018
Southeast Asian Games	NH	A	NH	G	NH	A	NH	A	NH	A	NH
Asian Championships	1R	A	QF	A				G	S	w/d	S
Asian Games	NH		2R	NH			S	NH			B
World Championships	A			B	NH	G	A	B	NH	G	A
Olympic Games	DNQ	NH			4th	NH			G	NH	

Tournament	IBF Grand Prix			BWF Superseries / Grand Prix											BWF World Tour			Best
Tournament	2004	2005	2006	2007	2008	2009	2010	2011	2012	2013	2014	2015	2016	2017	2018	2019	2020	Best
Malaysia Masters	NH					1R	A	W	A				1R	SF	A	2R	A	W ('11)
Indonesia Masters	NH						W	2R	W	F	A	W	A	NH	F	F	2R	W ('10, '12, '15)
Spain Masters	NH														A	QF	A	QF ('19)
German Open	A				1R (MD); 2R (XD)	A									A	2R	NH	2R ('08, '19)
All England Open	A							2R	W	W	W	F	QF	QF	2R	QF	A	W ('12, '13, '14)
Swiss Open	A							SF	W	SF	A	SF	A	2R	A		NH	W ('12)
Singapore Open	A						2R	W	2R	W	W	SF	SF	1R	F	A	NH	W ('11, '13, '14)
New Zealand Open	N/A	A		N/A		SF	NH	N/A	NH	A							Ret.	SF ('09)
Australian Open	N/A					A					w/d	SF	1R	1R	A	1R	Ret.	SF ('15)
Chinese Taipei Open	A				1R	SF	F	F	A						w/d	QF	Ret.	F ('10, '11)
Vietnam Open	NH		A	1R (MD); W (XD)	W	SF	A										Ret.	W ('07, '08)
Korea Open	A							QF	QF	QF	A	F	A			1R	Ret.	F ('15)
China Open	A							2R	SF	W	QF	1R	W	QF	2R	QF	Ret.	W ('13, '16)
Japan Open	A							2R	A			QF	A		w/d	1R	Ret.	QF ('15)
Dutch Open	A			2R (XD)	A												Ret.	2R ('07)
Denmark Open	A							1R	F	F	F	F	2R	SF	SF	1R	Ret.	F ('12, '13, '14, '15)
French Open				A				SF	QF	QF	W	1R	A	W	QF	1R	Ret.	W ('14, '17)
China Masters	NH	A													QF	A	Ret.	QF ('18)
Macau Open	NH		A		2R	A	W	W	W	A							Ret.	W ('10, '11, '12)
Hong Kong Open	NH	A					2R	A			QF	A	W	A	1R	1R	Ret.	W ('16)
Indonesia Open	1R (MD)	1R (MD)		A		Q2	2R	F	F	SF	SF	SF	2R	W	W	QF	Ret.	W ('17, '18)
Malaysia Open	A							1R	SF	A	SF	SF	W	SF	QF	QF	Ret.	W ('16)
Thailand Open	A			2R	1R	A	NH	A			NH	A				1R	Ret.	2R ('07)
Russian Open	N/A	A		QF (MD); 1R (XD)	A												Ret.	QF ('07)
India Open	NH				1R (MD); 2R (XD)	SF	A	W	W	W	SF	A	w/d	A	w/d	QF	Ret.	W ('11, '12, '13)
Philippines Open	NH			A	NH	2R	NH											2R ('09)
Superseries / World Tour Finals	NH				DNQ			RR	RR	RR	RR	RR	w/d	SF	DNQ		Ret.	SF ('17)
Year-end ranking						36	41	4	2	2	3	2	3	3	4	16	—N/a	1
Tournament	2004	2005	2006	2007	2008	2009	2010	2011	2012	2013	2014	2015	2016	2017	2018	2019	2020	Best

== Record against selected opponents ==
Mixed doubles results with Liliyana Natsir against Super Series finalists, Worlds Semi-finalists, and Olympic quarterfinalists.

- (China) Chai Biao & Tang Jinhua 1–0
- (China) He Hanbin & Bao Yixin 3–0
- (China) Liu Cheng & Bao Yixin 5–2
- (China) Qiu Zihan & Bao Yixin 1–0
- (China) Xu Chen & Ma Jin 9–10
- (China) Xu Chen & Yu Yang 0–1
- (China) Zhang Nan & Zhao Yunlei 6–13
- (China) Zhang Nan & Tang Jinhua 0–1
- (China) Zheng Siwei & Chen Qingchen 3–2
- (China) Zheng Siwei & Huang Yaqiong 1–4
- (Chinese Taipei) Chen Hung-ling & Cheng Wen-hsing 5–1
- (Chinese Taipei) Lee Sheng-mu & Chien Yu-chin 1–0
- (Denmark) Joachim Fischer Nielsen & Christinna Pedersen 4–6
- (Denmark) Mads Pieler Kolding & Kamilla Rytter Juhl 4–0
- (Denmark) Thomas Laybourn & Kamilla Rytter Juhl 3–1
- (England) / (Scotland) Chris Adcock & Imogen Bankier 1–2
- (England) Chris Adcock & Gabby Adcock 9–4
- (Scotland) / (England) Robert Blair & Gabby Adcock 2–0
- (Germany) Michael Fuchs & Birgit Michels 5–2
- (Hong Kong) Lee Chun Hei & Chau Hoi Wah 4–1
- (India) Valiyaveetil Diju & Jwala Gutta 2–0
- (Indonesia) Fran Kurniawan & Pia Zebadiah Bernadet 4–0
- (Indonesia) Hendra Aprida Gunawan & Vita Marissa 1–1
- (Indonesia) Nova Widianto & Vita Marissa 1–1
- (Indonesia) Praveen Jordan & Debby Susanto 4-1
- (Indonesia) Praveen Jordan & Vita Marissa 1–1
- (Indonesia) Riky Widianto & Richi Puspita Dili 2–0
- (Japan) Kenichi Hayakawa & Misaki Matsutomo 5–0
- (Japan) Keigo Sonoda & Naoko Fukuman 3–1
- (South Korea) Ko Sung-hyun & Kim Ha-na 3–4
- (South Korea) Lee Yong-dae & Lee Hyo-jung 1–0
- (South Korea) Lee Yong-dae & Ha Jung-eun 5–4
- (South Korea) Lee Yong-dae & Shin Seung-chan 1–0
- (South Korea) Shin Baek-cheol & Jang Ye-na 4–0
- (South Korea) Yoo Yeon-seong & Eom Hye-won 1–0
- (South Korea) Yoo Yeon-seong & Jang Ye-na 1–0
- (Malaysia) Chan Peng Soon & Goh Liu Ying 11–1
- (Poland) Robert Mateusiak & Nadieżda Zięba 2–0
- (Thailand) Songphon Anugritayawon & Kunchala Voravichitchaikul 2–0
- (Thailand) Sudket Prapakamol & Saralee Thungthongkam 4–3
