= 2011 Macau Open Grand Prix Gold =

Tournament details
- Dates: 29 November–4 December 2011
- Edition: 6
- Level: Grand Prix Gold
- Total prize money: US$200,000
- Venue: Cotai Arena in the Venetian
- Location: Macau

Champions
- Men's singles: (South Korea) Lee Hyun-il
- Women's singles: (China) Wang Shixian
- Men's doubles: (China) Chai Biao (China) Guo Zhendong
- Women's doubles: (South Korea) Jung Kyung-eun (South Korea) Kim Ha-na
- Mixed doubles: (Indonesia) Tontowi Ahmad (Indonesia) Liliyana Natsir

The 2011 Macau Open Grand Prix Gold was a badminton tournament which took place at the Cotai Arena in the Venetian, Macau on 29 November to 4 December 2011 and had a total purse of $200,000.

== Men's singles ==
=== Seeds ===
1. (Malaysia) Lee Chong Wei (withdrew)
2. (China) Lin Dan (withdrew)
3. (Indonesia) Taufik Hidayat (quarter-finals)
4. (China) Du Pengyu (final)
5. (Indonesia) Simon Santoso (semi-finals)
6. (South Korea) Lee Hyun-il (champion)
7. (China) Wang Zhengming (quarter-finals)
8. (Japan) Kenichi Tago (quarter-finals)
9. (Indonesia) Tommy Sugiarto (third round)
10. (Hong Kong) Hu Yun (second round)
11. (South Korea) Son Wan-ho (third round)
12. (Hong Kong) Wong Wing Ki (third round)
13. (Indonesia) Dionysius Hayom Rumbaka (third round)
14. (India) Parupalli Kashyap (quarter-finals)
15. (Indonesia) Alamsyah Yunus (third round)
16. (Chinese Taipei) Hsueh Hsuan-yi (third round)

=== Finals ===
Quarterfinals
14	(India) Parupalli Kashyap	9	10
5	(Indonesia) Simon Santoso	21	21
4	(China) Du Pengyu	21
7	(China) Wang Zhengming	6^{r}
6	(South Korea) Lee Hyun-il	12	21	21
3	(Indonesia) Taufik Hidayat	21	15	17
8	(Japan) Kenichi Tago	14	19
(Malaysia) Muhammad Hafiz Hashim	21	21

Semifinals
5	(Indonesia) Simon Santoso	17	17
4	(China) Du Pengyu	21	21
6	(South Korea) Lee Hyun-il	21	21
(Malaysia) Muhammad Hafiz Hashim	16	11

Final
4	(China) Du Pengyu	21	11	18
6	(South Korea) Lee Hyun-il	17	21	21

== Women's singles ==
=== Seeds ===
1. (China) Wang Shixian (champion)
2. (China) Jiang Yanjiao (second round)
3. (Chinese Taipei) Cheng Shao-chieh (semi-finals)
4. (South Korea) Sung Ji-hyun (first round)
5. (South Korea) Bae Yeon-ju (quarter-finals)
6. (Thailand) Porntip Buranaprasertsuk (second round)
7. (Thailand) Ratchanok Intanon (first round)
8. (China) Li Xuerui (semi-finals)

=== Finals ===
Semifinals
1	(China) Wang Shixian	20	21	21
8	(China) Li Xuerui	22	11	16
3	(Chinese Taipei) Cheng Shao-chieh	9	17
Q	(China) Han Li	21	21

Final
1	(China) Wang Shixian	21	21
Q	(China) Han Li	14	14

== Men's doubles ==
=== Seeds ===
1. (South Korea) Ko Sung-hyun / Yoo Yeon-seong (final)
2. (Indonesia) Mohammad Ahsan / Bona Septano (quarter-finals)
3. (China) Chai Biao / Guo Zhendong (champions)
4. (Indonesia) Markis Kido / Hendra Setiawan (quarter-finals)
5. (Indonesia) Hendra Aprida Gunawan / Alvent Yulianto (semi-finals)
6. (Japan) Hirokatsu Hashimoto / Noriyasu Hirata (withdrew)
7. (Chinese Taipei) Fang Chieh-min / Lee Sheng-mu (semi-finals)
8. (Japan) Naoki Kawamae / Shoji Sato (second round)

=== Finals ===
Semifinals
1	(South Korea) Ko Sung-hyun (South Korea) Yoo Yeon-seong	21	21
5	(Indonesia) Hendra Aprida Gunawan (Indonesia) Alvent Yulianto	13	18
3	(China) Chai Biao (China) Guo Zhendong	21	23
7	(Chinese Taipei) Fang Chieh-min (Chinese Taipei) Lee Sheng-mu	17	21

Final
1	(South Korea) Ko Sung-hyun (South Korea) Yoo Yeon-seong	19	19
3	(China) Chai Biao (China) Guo Zhendong	21	21

== Women's doubles ==
=== Seeds ===
1. (Chinese Taipei) Cheng Wen-hsing / Chien Yu-chin (withdrew)
2. (Japan) Miyuki Maeda / Satoko Suetsuna (semi-finals)
3. (Japan) Shizuka Matsuo / Mami Naito (semi-finals)
4. (Indonesia) Meiliana Jauhari / Greysia Polii (quarter-finals)
5. (Hong Kong) Poon Lok Yan / Tse Ying Suet (second round)
6. (Indonesia) Vita Marissa / Nadya Melati (first round)
7. (Thailand) Duanganong Aroonkesorn / Kunchala Voravichitchaikul (quarter-finals)
8. (South Korea) Jung Kyung-eun / Kim Ha-na (champions)

=== Finals ===
Semifinals
(South Korea) Eom Hye-won (South Korea) Jang Ye-na	21	21
3	(Japan) Shizuka Matsuo (Japan) Mami Naito	14	10
8	(South Korea) Jung Kyung-eun (South Korea) Kim Ha-na	21	19	21
2	(Japan) Miyuki Maeda (Japan) Satoko Suetsuna	14	21	13

Final
(South Korea) Eom Hye-won (South Korea) Jang Ye-na	4^{r}
8	(South Korea) Jung Kyung-eun (South Korea) Kim Ha-na	8

== Mixed doubles ==
=== Seeds ===
1. (Indonesia) Tontowi Ahmad / Liliyana Natsir (champions)
2. (Chinese Taipei) Chen Hung-ling / Cheng Wen-hsing (final)
3. (Thailand) Sudket Prapakamol / Saralee Thoungthongkam (semi-finals)
4. (Thailand) Songphon Anugritayawon / Kunchala Voravichitchaikul (second round)
5. (Malaysia) Chan Peng Soon / Goh Liu Ying (second round)
6. (Japan) Shintaro Ikeda / Reiko Shiota (withdrew)
7. (Chinese Taipei) Lee Sheng-mu / Chien Yu-chin (withdrew)
8. (Indonesia) Nova Widianto / Vita Marissa (second round)

=== Finals ===
Semifinals
1	(Indonesia) Tontowi Ahmad (Indonesia) Liliyana Natsir	21	21
3	(Thailand) Sudket Prapakamol (Thailand) Saralee Thoungthongkam	17	11
(Indonesia) Muhammad Rijal (Indonesia) Debby Susanto	21	14	14
2	(Chinese Taipei) Chen Hung-ling (Chinese Taipei) Cheng Wen-hsing	18	21	21

Final
1	(Indonesia) Tontowi Ahmad (Indonesia) Liliyana Natsir	w	/	o
2	(Chinese Taipei) Chen Hung-ling (Chinese Taipei) Cheng Wen-hsing

Preceded by Bitburger Open	BWF Grand Prix Gold and Grand Prix; 2011 season	Succeeded by Korea Grand Prix Gold
