= 2011 BWF World Championships – Mixed doubles =

Mixed Doubles at the 2011 BWF World Championships
- Venue: Wembley Arena
- Location: London, England
- Dates: August 8, 2011 – August 14, 2011

Medalists
gold medal	Zhang Nan; Zhao Yunlei	China
silver medal	(England) Chris Adcock (Scotland) Imogen Bankier	Great Britain
bronze medal	Xu Chen; Ma Jin	China
bronze medal	Tontowi Ahmad; Lilyana Natsir	Indonesia

The mixed doubles tournament of the 2011 BWF World Championships (World Badminton Championships) was held from August 8 to 14. Zheng Bo and Ma Jin were the defending champions.
Zhang Nan and Zhao Yunlei won the title after defeating Chris Adcock and Imogen Bankier 21–15, 21–7 in the final.

== Seeds ==
1. (China) Zhang Nan / Zhao Yunlei (champions)
2. (Indonesia) Tantowi Ahmad / Lilyana Natsir (semifinals)
3. (Thailand) Sudket Prapakamol / Saralee Thoungthongkam (second round)
4. (China) Tao Jiaming / Tian Qing (quarterfinals)
5. (Denmark) Joachim Fischer Nielsen / Christinna Pedersen (quarterfinals)
6. (China) Xu Chen / Ma Jin (semifinals, retired)
7. (Chinese Taipei) Chen Hung-ling / Cheng Wen-hsing (quarterfinals)
8. (Thailand) Songphon Anugritayawon / Kunchala Voravichitchaikul (second round)
9. (Indonesia) Fran Kurniawan / Pia Zebadiah Bernadeth (second round)
10. (England) Nathan Robertson / Jenny Wallwork (second round)
11. (Chinese Taipei) Lee Sheng-mu / Chien Yu-chin(third round)
12. (Denmark) Thomas Laybourn / Kamilla Rytter Juhl (third round)
13. (Germany) Michael Fuchs / Birgit Michels (third round)
14. (Poland) Robert Mateusiak / Nadieżda Zięba (third round)
15. (Japan) Shintaro Ikeda / Reiko Shiota (third round)
16. (India) Valiyaveetil Diju / Jwala Gutta (third round)

== Draw ==
=== Finals ===
Quarterfinals
1	(China) Zhang Nan (China) Zhao Yunlei	21	21
7	(Chinese Taipei) Chen Hung-ling (Chinese Taipei) Cheng Wen-hsing	14	14
(Singapore) Chayut Triyachart (Singapore) Yao Lei	16	7
6	(China) Xu Chen (China) Ma Jin	21	21
(England) Chris Adcock (Scotland) Imogen Bankier	21	21
4	(China) Tao Jiaming (China) Tian Qing	16	18
5	(Denmark) Joachim Fischer Nielsen (Denmark) Christinna Pedersen	12	13
2	(Indonesia) Tantowi Ahmad (Indonesia) Lilyana Natsir	21	21

Semifinals
1	(China) Zhang Nan (China) Zhao Yunlei	21
6	(China) Xu Chen (China) Ma Jin	17^{r}
(England) Chris Adcock (Scotland) Imogen Bankier	21	21
2	(Indonesia) Tantowi Ahmad (Indonesia) Lilyana Natsir	16	19

Final
1	(China) Zhang Nan (China) Zhao Yunlei	21	21
(England) Chris Adcock (Scotland) Imogen Bankier	15	7

=== Section 1 ===
First Round
(Croatia) Z Durkinjak (Croatia) S Poznanović	17	12
(Russia) V Durkin (Russia) N Vislova	21	21
(Japan) H Hashimoto (Japan) M Fujii	21	21
(Canada) A Liu (Canada) J Ko	17	6
(Indonesia) M Kido (Indonesia) L Nurlita	wo
(Poland) W Szkudlarczyk (Poland) A Wojtkowska

Second Round
1	(China) Zhang N (China) Zhao YL	21	21
(Hong Kong) Wong WH (Hong Kong) Chau HW	10	13
13	(Germany) M Fuchs (Germany) B Michels	23	21
(Russia) V Durkin (Russia) N Vislova	21	18
7	(Chinese Taipei) Chen H-l (Chinese Taipei) Cheng W-h	21	21
(Japan) H Hashimoto (Japan) M Fujii	16	12
12	(Denmark) T Laybourn (Denmark) K Rytter Juhl	21	21
(Poland) W Szkudlarczyk (Poland) A Wojtkowska	16	17

Third Round
1	(China) Zhang N (China) Zhao YL	21	21
13	(Germany) M Fuchs (Germany) B Michels	13	18
7	(Chinese Taipei) Chen H-l (Chinese Taipei) Cheng W-h	15	22	21
12	(Denmark) T Laybourn (Denmark) K Rytter Juhl	21	20	19

Quarterfinal
1	(China) Zhang N (China) Zhao YL	21	21
7	(Chinese Taipei) Chen H-l (Chinese Taipei) Cheng W-h	14	14

=== Section 2 ===
First Round
(Switzerland) A Dumartheray (Switzerland) S Jaquet	21	12	6
(Singapore) C Triyachart (Singapore) Yao L	17	21	21
(Mexico) L Muñoz (Mexico) C Gonzalez	9	5
(Malaysia) Chan PS (Malaysia) Goh LY	21	21
(Peru) R Pacheco (Peru) C Rivero	wo
(Netherlands) J Arends (Netherlands) S Piek
(Bulgaria) S Makarski (Bulgaria) D Dimova	10	21
(Chinese Taipei) Fang C-m (Chinese Taipei) Wang P-r	21	23

Second Round
3	(Thailand) S Prapakamol (Thailand) S Thoungthongkam	14	19
(Singapore) C Triyachart (Singapore) Yao L	21	21
10	(England) N Robertson (England) J Wallwork	19	19
(Malaysia) Chan PS (Malaysia) Goh LY	21	21
6	(China) Xu C (China) Ma J	21	21
(Netherlands) J Arends (Netherlands) S Piek	11	7
9	(Indonesia) F Kurniawan (Indonesia) PZ Bernadeth	13	21	19
(Chinese Taipei) Fang C-m (Chinese Taipei) Wang P-r	21	11	21

Third Round
(Singapore) C Triyachart (Singapore) Yao L	21	21
(Malaysia) Chan PS (Malaysia) Goh LY	19	14
6	(China) Xu C (China) Ma J	21	21
(Chinese Taipei) Fang C-m (Chinese Taipei) Wang P-r	9	8

Quarterfinals
(Singapore) C Triyachart (Singapore) Yao L	16	7
6	(China) Xu C (China) Ma J	21	21

=== Section 3 ===
First Round
(Austria) R Zirnwald (Austria) E Baldauf	21	21
(Belarus) A Konakh (Belarus) A Zaitsava	19	13
(England) C Adcock (Scotland) I Bankier	21	21
(Canada) T Ng (Canada) G Gao	11	14
(Denmark) MP Kolding (Denmark) J Houmann	21	21
(Indonesia) M Rijal (Indonesia) D Susanto	17	19
(Netherlands) D Khodabux (Netherlands) S Barning	19	21	21
(Germany) J Schöttler (Germany) S Marinello	21	16	14

Second Round
(Austria) R Zirnwald (Austria) E Baldauf	9	10
15	(Japan) S Ikeda (Japan) R Shiota	21	21
(England) C Adcock (Scotland) I Bankier	24	21
8	(Thailand) S Anugritayawon (Thailand) K Voravichitchaikul	22	19
(Denmark) MP Kolding (Denmark) J Houmann	16	21	18
14	(Poland) R Mateusiak (Poland) N Zięba	21	16	21
(Netherlands) D Khodabux (Netherlands) S Barning	8	13
4	(China) Tao JM (China) Tian Q	21	21

Third Round
15	(Japan) S Ikeda (Japan) R Shiota	21	15	16
(England) C Adcock (Scotland) I Bankier	17	21	21
14	(Poland) R Mateusiak (Poland) N Zięba	15	22	16
4	(China) Tao JM (China) Tian Q	21	20	21

Quarterfinals
(England) C Adcock (Scotland) I Bankier	21	21
4	(China) Tao JM (China) Tian Q	16	18

=== Section 4 ===
First Round
(Chinese Taipei) Liao M-c (Chinese Taipei) Chen H-h	18	16
(Malaysia) Ong JG (Malaysia) Chong SC	21	21
(Ukraine) V Atrashchenkov (Ukraine) E Prus	21	21
(South Africa) DL James (South Africa) MC Edwards	18	14
(England) M Ellis (England) H Olver	12	13
(Russia) A Nikolaenko (Russia) V Sorokina	21	21
(Republic of Ireland) S Magee (Republic of Ireland) C Magee	18	22	21
(France) B Careme (France) L Choinet	21	20	19

Second Round
(Malaysia) Ong JG (Malaysia) Chong SC	11	15
16	(India) V Diju (India) J Gutta	21	21
(Ukraine) V Atrashchenkov (Ukraine) E Prus	9	13
5	(Denmark) J Fischer Nielsen (Denmark) C Pedersen	21	21
(Russia) A Nikolaenko (Russia) V Sorokina	18	21	15
11	(Chinese Taipei) Lee S-m (Chinese Taipei) Chien Y-c	21	15	21
(Republic of Ireland) S Magee (Republic of Ireland) C Magee	9	8
2	(Indonesia) T Ahmad (Indonesia) L Natsir	21	21

Third Round
16	(India) V Diju (India) J Gutta	9	15
5	(Denmark) J Fischer Nielsen (Denmark) C Pedersen	21	21
11	(Chinese Taipei) Lee S-m (Chinese Taipei) Chien Y-c	9	12
2	(Indonesia) T Ahmad (Indonesia) L Natsir	21	21

Quarterfinals
5	(Denmark) J Fischer Nielsen (Denmark) C Pedersen	12	13
2	(Indonesia) T Ahmad (Indonesia) L Natsir	21	21
