= Chris Adcock =

English badminton player (born 1989)

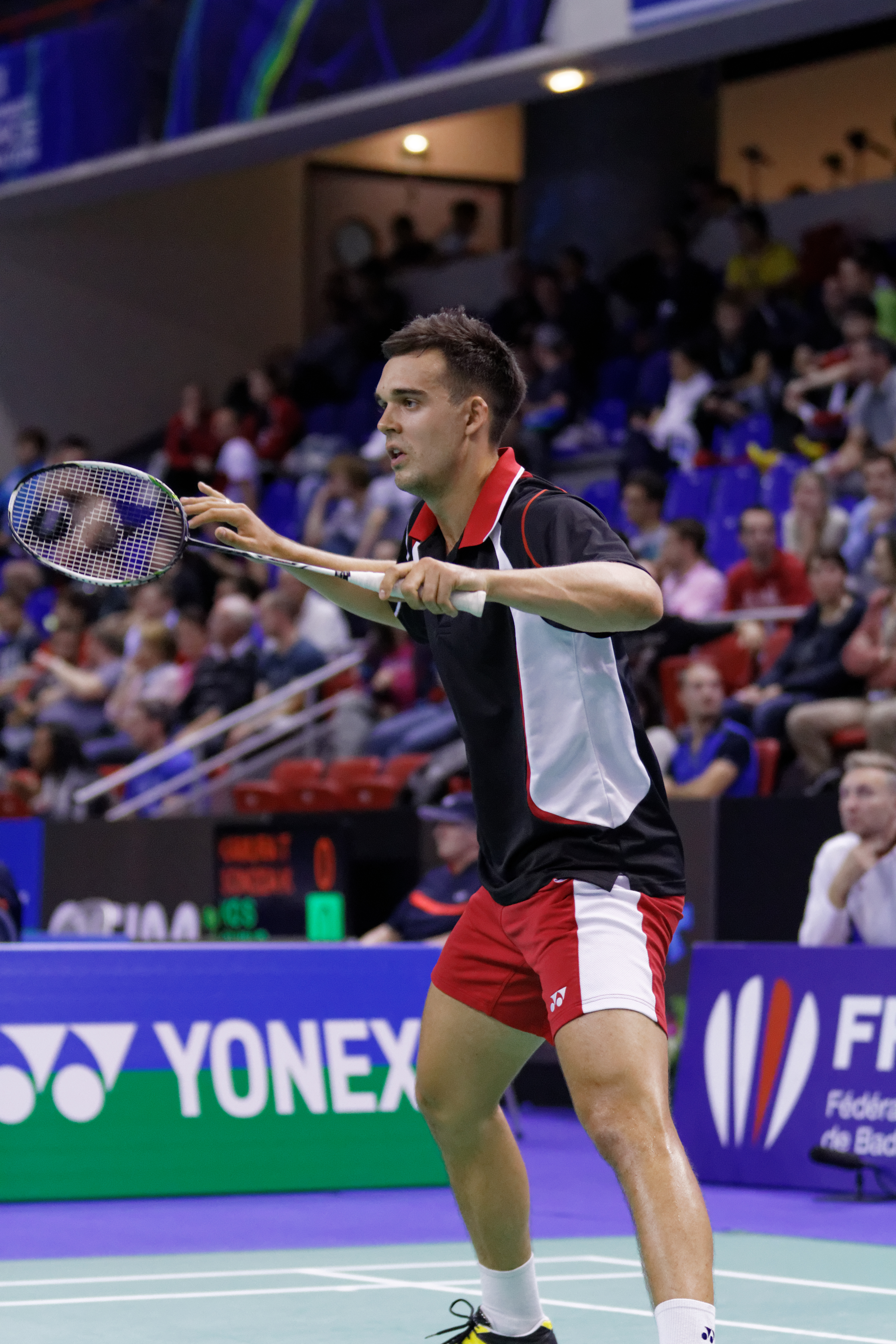
- Adcock at the 2013 French Super Series

Personal information
- Born: Christopher Thomas Adcock; 27 April 1989 (age 37) Leicester, England
- Height: 1.83 m (6 ft 0 in)
- Weight: 79 kg (174 lb)
- Spouse: Gabby Adcock (m. 2013)

Sport
- Country: England
- Sport: Badminton
- Handedness: Left
- Retired: 27 May 2021

Men's & mixed doubles
- Highest ranking: 9 (MD 22 May 2014); 4 (XD 24 August 2017)
- BWF profile
Medal record
Men's badminton
Representing Great Britain
European Games
Silver medal – second place	2019 Minsk	Mixed doubles
Representing England
World Championships
Silver medal – second place	2011 London	Mixed doubles
Bronze medal – third place	2017 Glasgow	Mixed doubles
Commonwealth Games
Gold medal – first place	2014 Glasgow	Mixed doubles
Gold medal – first place	2018 Gold Coast	Mixed doubles
Silver medal – second place	2014 Glasgow	Mixed team
Bronze medal – third place	2010 Delhi	Mixed team
Bronze medal – third place	2018 Gold Coast	Mixed team
European Championships
Gold medal – first place	2017 Kolding	Mixed doubles
Gold medal – first place	2018 Huelva	Mixed doubles
Bronze medal – third place	2012 Karlskrona	Men's doubles
Bronze medal – third place	2012 Karlskrona	Mixed doubles
Bronze medal – third place	2014 Kazan	Men's doubles
European Mixed Team Championships
Silver medal – second place	2015 Leuven	Mixed team
Bronze medal – third place	2013 Moscow	Mixed team
Bronze medal – third place	2017 Lubin	Mixed team
European Men's Team Championships
Silver medal – second place	2008 Almere	Men's team
Silver medal – second place	2014 Basel	Men's team
Bronze medal – third place	2012 Amsterdam	Men's team
World Junior Championships
Silver medal – second place	2007 Waitakere	Mixed doubles
European Junior Championships
Gold medal – first place	2007 Völklingen	Mixed team
Gold medal – first place	2007 Völklingen	Boys' doubles
- Website: www.theadcocks.com

Christopher Thomas Adcock (born 27 April 1989) is a retired English badminton player. Adcock is currently sponsored by Yonex and YC Sports and plays for the University of Nottingham-based NBL team. He entered the National team in 2006, and later won the boys' doubles and mixed team titles at the 2007 European Junior Championships. He was a World Championships medalists winning a silver in 2011 with Imogen Bankier and a bronze in 2017 with Gabby Adcock. Together with Gabby, he also won a silver medal at the 2007 World Junior Championships, and then claimed the gold medals at the Commonwealth Games in 2014 and 2018; and at the European Championships in 2017 and 2018.

Chris Adcock also representing Great Britain competed at the 2012, 2016 Olympic Games and at the 2019 European Games. In the European Games, he and Gabby won the mixed doubles silver medal.

== Career ==
At the 2008 Thomas Cup Chris Adcock made his debut at a major senior international tournament where he played one match in the group stage. He would continue to represent England at the 2009 Sudirman Cup where the team played sixth. His world championships debut came at the 2010 BWF World Championships where he entered Mixed doubles with Gabrielle White, but lost in the first round. He later switched Mixed Doubles partners to compete with Scottish player Imogen Bankier. They had a Cinderella run at the 2011 London Worlds where they defeated three seeded pairs before losing in the final. Chris Adcock also competes in Men's Doubles, currently pairing with fellow Englishmen Andrew Ellis. Although they qualified for the Olympics, they had a disappointing performance and lost in the first round.

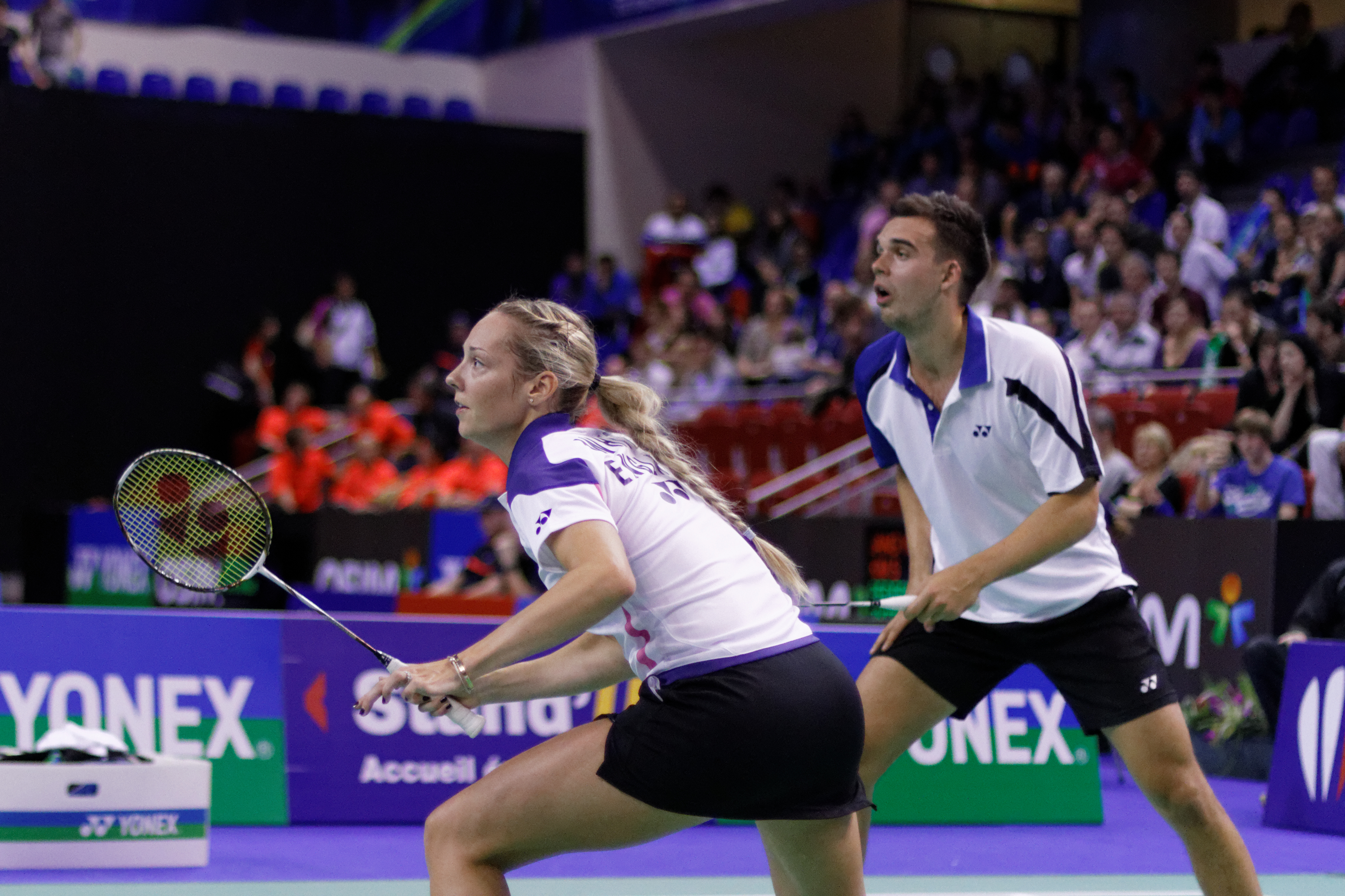
Chris Adcock and his current partner in mixed doubles Gabby Adcock

In October 2012, the pair announced their decision to split, with Bankier stating her intention to return to Badminton Scotland and form a Scottish partnership. Subsequently, Adcock reignited his mixed doubles partnership with White, whom he later married. They later won the BWF Super Series Masters Finals in 2015, and become the first British players to do so.

Adcock competed in the 2014 Commonwealth Games, winning gold in the mixed doubles alongside his wife. In 2015, he became the champion at the Dubai World Superseries Finals in mixed doubles event. In 2016, he competed at the Summer Olympics in the mixed doubles event, but did not advance to the knockout stage.

In October 2016, the Adcocks were the semifinalist at the Denmark Open, but they lost to home duo Joachim Fischer Nielsen and Christinna Pedersen in the straight games. The Adcocks then reaching the final at the Grand Prix Gold tournament at the 2016 Bitburger Open, defeated by the Chinese pair Zheng Siwei and Chen Qingchen with the score 16–21, 21–23. At the end of 2016 BWF Season, the Adcocks were qualified to compete at the Dubai World Superseries Finals. They advanced to the final round after placed second in the group stage, won a semifinal match against Praveen Jordan and Debby Susanto of Indonesia in three games, but they lost again to Chinese paired Zheng and Cheng.

In 2017, the Adcocks won the gold medal at the European Championships in Denmark defeating Joachim Fischer Nielsen and Christinna Pedersen in the final. They also clinched the bronze medal at the BWF World Championships in Glasgow. In 2018, he competed at the Commonwealth Games in Gold Coast, and defend the mixed doubles gold with his wife, also claimed the mixed team bronze.

In 2019, he qualified to represent Great Britain at the 2019 European Games, played in the mixed doubles with his wife. Competed as the top seeds the duo advance to the final stage, they were defeated by their compatriot Marcus Ellis and Lauren Smith in straight games 14–21, 9–21, and settle for a silver medal. Badminton England reported his retirement on 27 May 2021. The 2020 Denmark Open was his last tournament.

== Achievements ==
=== BWF World Championships ===
Mixed doubles
Year	Venue	Partner	Opponent	Score	Result
2011	Wembley Arena; London, England	(Scotland) Imogen Bankier	(China) Zhang Nan (China) Zhao Yunlei	15–21, 7–21	Silver
2017	Emirates Arena; Glasgow, Scotland	(England) Gabby Adcock	(China) Zheng Siwei (China) Chen Qingchen	15–21, 21–23	Bronze

=== Commonwealth Games ===
Mixed doubles
Year	Venue	Partner	Opponent	Score	Result
2014	Emirates Arena; Glasgow, Scotland	(England) Gabby Adcock	(England) Chris Langridge (England) Heather Olver	21–9, 21–12	Gold
2018	Carrara Sports and Leisure Centre; Gold Coast, Australia	(England) Gabby Adcock	(England) Marcus Ellis (England) Lauren Smith	19–21, 21–17, 21–16	Gold

=== European Games ===
Mixed doubles
Year	Venue	Partner	Opponent	Score	Result
2019	Falcon Club, Minsk, Belarus	(United Kingdom) Gabby Adcock	(United Kingdom) Marcus Ellis (United Kingdom) Lauren Smith	14–21, 9–21	Silver

=== European Championships ===
Men's doubles
Year	Venue	Partner	Opponent	Score	Result
2012	Telenor Arena; Karlskrona, Sweden	(England) Andrew Ellis	(Denmark) Mathias Boe (Denmark) Carsten Mogensen	11–21, 14–21	Bronze
2014	Gymnastics Center; Kazan, Russia	(England) Andrew Ellis	(Denmark) Mads Conrad-Petersen (Denmark) Mads Pieler Kolding	16–21, 21–19, 8–21	Bronze

Mixed doubles
Year	Venue	Partner	Opponent	Score	Result
2012	Telenor Arena; Karlskrona, Sweden	(Scotland) Imogen Bankier	(Poland) Robert Mateusiak (Poland) Nadieżda Zięba	17–21, 21–17, 19–21	Bronze
2017	Sydbank Arena; Kolding, Denmark	(England) Gabby Adcock	(Denmark) Joachim Fischer Nielsen (Denmark) Christinna Pedersen	21–17, 18–21, 21–19	Gold
2018	Palacio de los Deportes Carolina Marín; Huelva, Spain	(England) Gabby Adcock	(Denmark) Mathias Christiansen (Denmark) Christinna Pedersen	21–18, 17–21, 21–18	Gold

=== BWF World Junior Championships ===
Mixed doubles
Year	Venue	Partner	Opponent	Score	Result
2007	Waitakere Trust Stadium; Waitakere City, New Zealand	(England) Gabrielle White	(Malaysia) Lim Khim Wah (Malaysia) Ng Hui Lin	25–23, 20–22, 19–21	Silver

=== European Junior Championships ===
Boys' doubles
Year	Venue	Partner	Opponent	Score	Result
2007	Hermann-Neuberger-Halle; Völklingen, Germany	(England) Peter Mills	(Denmark) Mads Conrad-Petersen (Denmark) Mads Pieler Kolding	21–16, 21–15	Gold

=== BWF World Tour (3 runners-up) ===
The BWF World Tour, which was announced on 19 March 2017 and implemented in 2018, is a series of elite badminton tournaments sanctioned by the Badminton World Federation (BWF). The BWF World Tour is divided into levels of World Tour Finals, Super 1000, Super 750, Super 500, Super 300, and the BWF Tour Super 100.

Mixed doubles
Year	Tournament	Level	Partner	Opponent	Score	Result
2018	Thailand Open	Super 500	(England) Gabby Adcock	(Indonesia) Hafiz Faizal (Indonesia) Gloria Emanuelle Widjaja	12–21, 12–21	(silver) Runner-up
2019	Dutch Open	Super 100	(England) Gabby Adcock	(Netherlands) Robin Tabeling (Netherlands) Selena Piek	17–21, 13–21	(silver) Runner-up
2020	Denmark Open	Super 750	(England) Gabby Adcock	(Germany) Mark Lamsfuß (Germany) Isabel Herttrich	21–18, 11–21, 14–21	(silver) Runner-up

=== BWF Superseries (2 titles, 2 runners-up) ===
The BWF Superseries, which was launched on 14 December 2006 and implemented in 2007, is a series of elite badminton tournaments, sanctioned by the Badminton World Federation (BWF). BWF Superseries levels are Superseries and Superseries Premier. A season of Superseries consists of twelve tournaments around the world that have been introduced since 2011. Successful players are invited to the Superseries Finals, which are held at the end of each year.

Mixed doubles
Year	Tournament	Partner	Opponent	Score	Result
2013	Hong Kong Open	(England) Gabrielle White	(China) Liu Cheng (China) Bao Yixin	21–14, 24–22	(gold) Winner
2014	French Open	(England) Gabby Adcock	(Indonesia) Tontowi Ahmad (Indonesia) Liliyana Natsir	9–21, 16–21	(silver) Runner-up
2015	Dubai World Superseries Finals	(England) Gabby Adcock	(South Korea) Ko Sung-hyun (South Korea) Kim Ha-na	21–14, 21–17	(gold) Winner
2016	Dubai World Superseries Finals	(England) Gabby Adcock	(China) Zheng Siwei (China) Chen Qingchen	12–21, 12–21	(silver) Runner-up

BWF Super Series Finals tournament
BWF Super Series Premier tournament
BWF Super Series tournament

=== BWF Grand Prix (1 title, 4 runners-up) ===
The BWF Grand Prix had two levels, the BWF Grand Prix and Grand Prix Gold. It was a series of badminton tournaments sanctioned by the Badminton World Federation (BWF) which was held from 2007 to 2017.

Men's doubles
Year	Tournament	Partner	Opponent	Score	Result
2009	Bitburger Open	(England) Andrew Ellis	(India) Rupesh Kumar (India) Sanave Thomas	21–17, 20–22, 22–24	(silver) Runner-up

Mixed doubles
Year	Tournament	Partner	Opponent	Score	Result
2013	Bitburger Open	(England) Gabrielle White	(Germany) Michael Fuchs (Germany) Birgit Michels	19–21, 15–21	(silver) Runner-up
2014	Swiss Open	(England) Gabby Adcock	(China) Chai Biao (China) Tang Jinhua	21–17, 21–13	(gold) Winner
2015	Bitburger Open	(England) Gabby Adcock	(Poland) Robert Mateusiak (Poland) Nadieżda Zięba	18–21, 17–21	(silver) Runner-up
2016	Bitburger Open	(England) Gabby Adcock	(China) Zheng Siwei (China) Chen Qingchen	16–21, 21–23	(silver) Runner-up

BWF Grand Prix Gold tournament
BWF Grand Prix tournament

=== BWF International Challenge/Series (5 titles, 2 runners-up) ===
Men's doubles
Year	Tournament	Partner	Opponent	Score	Result
2010	Scottish International	(England) Andrew Ellis	(England) Marcus Ellis (England) Peter Mills	19–21, 21–11, 15–21	(silver) Runner-up
2010	Irish International	(England) Andrew Ellis	(England) Anthony Clark (England) Chris Langridge	21–13, 21–16	(gold) Winner

Mixed doubles
Year	Tournament	Partner	Opponent	Score	Result
2008	Portugal International	(England) Gabrielle White	(China) Zhang Yi (China) Cai Jiani	14–21, 11–21	(silver) Runner-up
2010	Scottish International	(Scotland) Imogen Bankier	(Germany) Till Zander (Germany) Gitte Koehler	21–10, 21–12	(gold) Winner
2010	Irish International	(Scotland) Imogen Bankier	(Denmark) Christian John Skovgaard (Denmark) Britta Andersen	21–13, 21–11	(gold) Winner
2010	Italian International	(Scotland) Imogen Bankier	(Estonia) Gert Kunka (Sweden) Amanda Hogstrom	21–14, 21–15	(gold) Winner
2012	Finnish Open	(Scotland) Imogen Bankier	(Denmark) Anders Skaarup Rasmussen (Denmark) Sara Thygesen	22–24, 21–12, 21–13	(gold) Winner

BWF International Challenge tournament
BWF International Series tournament

== Record against selected opponents ==
Mixed doubles results with Imogen Bankier against Super Series finalists, Worlds Semi-finalists, and Olympic quarterfinalists.

- (China) Tao Jiaming & Tian Qing 1–0
- (China) Xu Chen & Ma Jin 0–3
- (China) Zhang Nan & Zhao Yunlei 2–5
- (Chinese Taipei) Chen Hung-ling & Cheng Wen-hsing 1–0
- (Denmark) Thomas Laybourn & Kamilla Rytter Juhl 0–1
- (Germany) Michael Fuchs & Birgit Michels 0–1
- (Indonesia) Tontowi Ahmad & Liliyana Natsir 1–3
- (Japan) Shintaro Ikeda & Reiko Shiota 2–0
- (Poland) Robert Mateusiak & Nadieżda Zięba 0–1
- (Russia) Aleksandr Nikolaenko & Valeria Sorokina 0–1
- (Scotland) / (England) Robert Blair & Gabrielle White 1–1
- (Thailand) Songphon Anugritayawon & Kunchala Voravichitchaikul 1–1
- (Thailand) Sudket Prapakamol & Saralee Thungthongkam 0–3
