= Imogen Bankier =

Scottish badminton player and businesswoman (born 1987)

Personal information
- Born: 18 November 1987 (age 38) Glasgow, Scotland
- Height: 5 ft 7 in (170 cm)

Sport
- Country: Scotland
- Sport: Badminton
- Handedness: Right
- Coached by: Peter Jeffrey

Women's & mixed doubles
- Highest ranking: 19 (WD with Petya Nedelcheva 14 August 2014); 10 XD (with Chris Adcock 5 April 2012); 11 XD (with Robert Blair 5 April 2012)
- BWF profile
Medal record
Women's badminton
Representing Scotland
World Championships
Silver medal – second place	2011 London	Mixed doubles
Commonwealth Games
Bronze medal – third place	2014 Glasgow	Mixed doubles
European Championships
Bronze medal – third place	2012 Karlskrona	Mixed doubles

Imogen Bankier (born 18 November 1987) is a businesswoman and former badminton player from Scotland. After starting playing the sport at the age of 9, Bankier won the national championships at every age level from Under 17 upwards. The highlight of her professional career was reaching the final of the mixed doubles at the 2011 World Championships in Wembley, London. She and her partner Chris Adcock were defeated in the match by the Chinese team of Zhang Nan and Zhao Yunlei.

== Personal life ==
Bankier is right handed, 5 ft 7in tall and used equipment manufactured by Yonex, one of her sponsors. Her other sponsor is Glenkeir Whiskies which is run by her father, Celtic chairman Ian Bankier. Imogen was one of several high-profile British and International players to speak out against the Badminton World Federation's plan to force female players to wear short skirts. The BWF claimed the move was aimed at "raising badminton's profile and that of women players" whereas Bankier hit back "I will fight to make sure this dated and simply sexist rule does not happen."

As of 2016 Bankier resides in Paris, France, running a whisky store on the Place De La Madeleine in the 8th arrondissement.

== Career ==
Bankier started playing badminton at the age of nine in what she describes as "very competitive Bankier family games in the back garden." Before competing at senior level in 2007, she won women's doubles and mixed doubles titles in the Under-17, Under-19, Under-21 and Under-23 age groups as well as various international open championships in doubles. Since making the step up she has taken a total of sixteen Scottish titles, six coming in the women's doubles and ten in the mixed doubles.

Bankier's first major international tournament was the 2008 European Championships in Herning, Denmark where she lost out to the English pair in the quarter-finals of both doubles tournaments. She returned to compete in the mixed doubles at the 2010 Commonwealth Games in Delhi, India where she again fell to an English pairing (who would go on to win silver) in the quarter-finals.

Bankier's career highlight to date however came on 14 August 2011 when she won a silver medal in the mixed doubles event at the World Championships. In a surprise run, she and her English partner Chris Adcock defeated four seeded pairs before losing out 21–15, 21–7 to the world number 1 pair of Zhang Nan and Zhao Yunlei in the final. Despite being somewhat disappointed with her personal performance in the final, Bankier was quoted as saying that her play in the tournament as a whole would hopefully increase her chances of being selected for the 2012 London Olympics. She and Adcock followed this up a year later by winning a bronze medal at the European Championships in Karlskrona, Sweden. Shortly before these championships the pair broke into the top 10 of the world rankings for the first time.

On 30 May 2012, Bankier and Adcock were selected to represent Great Britain in the badminton mixed doubles at the 2012 London Olympics but were surprisingly eliminated in the opening round. On 30 October 2012, she was leaving the team GB training group stating "The GB programme is geared towards long-term development of a system for British badminton, but I don’t believe the environment and the programme at Milton Keynes are the best way forward for me, for Rio in 2016." This also ended her partnership with Adcock. She thanked the team for helping her develop as a player and stressed that she was not thinking of retiring but was joining Badminton Scotland to prepare for the 2014 Commonwealth Games in her home city. In that championship she won bronze medal with Robert Blair, defeating the Malaysian pair Chan Peng Soon and Lai Pei Jing in the play off match.

Her most recent mixed doubles partner was fellow Scot Robert Blair and her women's doubles partner was Bulgarian Petya Nedelcheva.

In February 2015, after winning the Scottish National Championships in doubles and mixed doubles, it was announced that she was "taking something of a sabbatical as she tries to decide what her sporting future holds". Bankier stated she had decided not to try and qualify for the 2016 Summer Olympics in Rio de Janeiro as she said she was struggling to find a partner she likes playing with. She stated that she has started working for her father's whisky business, Glenkeir Whiskies.

After the 2016 Nationals, where Bankier won her record 10th consecutive mixed doubles titles. Before the match she was presented with an award for her services to the game by Badminton Scotland president Dan Travers.

Before the game Chief Executive Anne Smillie paid tribute: "She is by far the most successful women's player Scotland has produced and has enjoyed a tremendous badminton career. Now we hope her new business career is just as successful. Today she is bidding for her 10th consecutive mixed doubles title to go with her six women’s doubles titles. But little did we know back in 2007 that Imogen Bankier would go on to become not just the best in Scotland but one of the world’s best doubles players."

== Achievements ==
=== BWF World Championships ===
Mixed doubles
Year	Venue	Partner	Opponent	Score	Result
2011	Wembley Arena; London, England	(England) Chris Adcock	(China) Zhang Nan (China) Zhao Yunlei	15–21, 7–21	Silver

=== Commonwealth Games ===
Mixed doubles
Year	Venue	Partner	Opponent	Score	Result
2014	Emirates Arena; Glasgow, Scotland	(Scotland) Robert Blair	(Malaysia) Chan Peng Soon (Malaysia) Lai Pei Jing	21–17, 21–11	Bronze

=== European Championships ===
Mixed doubles
Year	Venue	Partner	Opponent	Score	Result
2012	Telenor Arena; Karlskrona, Sweden	(England) Chris Adcock	(Poland) Robert Mateusiak (Poland) Nadieżda Zięba	17–21, 21–17, 19–21	Bronze

=== BWF Grand Prix ===
The BWF Grand Prix had two levels, the Grand Prix and Grand Prix Gold. It was a series of badminton tournaments sanctioned by the Badminton World Federation (BWF) and played between 2007 and 2017.

Mixed doubles
Year	Tournament	Partner	Opponent	Score	Result
2007	Bitburger Open	(England) Robert Blair	(Germany) Kristof Hopp (Germany) Birgit Overzier	17–21, 17–21	(silver) Runner-up
2010	German Open	(England) Robert Blair	(Hong Kong) Yohan Hadikusumo Wiratama (Hong Kong) Tse Ying Suet	5–15 retired	(silver) Runner-up
2013	Scottish Open	(Scotland) Robert Blair	(England) Chris Langridge (England) Heather Olver	21–16, 21–14	(gold) Winner
2014	German Open	(Scotland) Robert Blair	(South Korea) Ko Sung-hyun (South Korea) Kim Ha-na	21–15, 21–18	(gold) Winner
2014	Scottish Open	(Scotland) Robert Blair	(Denmark) Niclas Nøhr (Denmark) Sara Thygesen	21–18, 21–14	(gold) Winner

BWF Grand Prix Gold tournament
BWF Grand Prix tournament

=== BWF International Challenge/Series/European Circuit ===
Women's doubles
Year	Tournament	Partner	Opponent	Score	Result
2005	Slovak International	(Scotland) Emma Mason	(Poland) Nadieżda Kostiuczyk (Poland) Kamila Augustyn	7–15, 3–15	(silver) Runner-up
2005	Hungarian International	(Scotland) Emma Mason	(Russia) Ekaterina Ananina (Russia) Anastasia Russkikh	4–15, 15–10, 5–15	(silver) Runner-up
2005	Irish International	(Scotland) Emma Mason	(England) Jenny Wallwork (England) Sarah Bok	5–15, 15–3, 16–17	(silver) Runner-up
2006	Hungarian International	(Scotland) Emma Mason	(Russia) Ekaterina Ananina (Russia) Anastasia Russkikh	18–21, 8–21	(silver) Runner-up
2006	Iceland International	(Scotland) Emma Mason	(Iceland) Tinna Helgadóttir (Iceland) Ragna Ingólfsdóttir	21–16, 21–19	(gold) Winner
2006	Norwegian International	(Scotland) Emma Mason	(Republic of Ireland) Chloe Magee (Republic of Ireland) Bing Huang	21–16, 21–19	(gold) Winner
2006	Irish International	(Scotland) Emma Mason	(Netherlands) Karina de Wit (Netherlands) Ginny Severien	21–14, 11–21, 22–20	(gold) Winner
2013	Finnish Open	(Bulgaria) Petya Nedelcheva	(Denmark) Lena Grebak (Denmark) Maria Helsbøl	21–10, 21–24	(gold) Winner
2013	Dutch International	(Bulgaria) Petya Nedelcheva	(Japan) Rie Eto (Japan) Yu Wakita	21–14, 18–21, 12–21	(silver) Runner-up
2013	Kharkiv International	(Bulgaria) Petya Nedelcheva	(Denmark) Lena Grebak (Denmark) Maria Helsbøl	21–11, 21–12	(gold) Winner
2013	Belgian International	(Bulgaria) Petya Nedelcheva	(Bulgaria) Gabriela Stoeva (Bulgaria) Stefani Stoeva	13–21, 21–11, 21–18	(gold) Winner
2013	Czech International	(Bulgaria) Petya Nedelcheva	(Scotland) Jillie Cooper (Scotland) Kirsty Gilmour	21–6, 21–14	(gold) Winner
2014	Orléans International	(Bulgaria) Petya Nedelcheva	(Bulgaria) Gabriela Stoeva (Bulgaria) Stefani Stoeva	21–14, 21–7	(gold) Winner
2014	Spanish Open	(Scotland) Kirsty Gilmour	(Bulgaria) Gabriela Stoeva (Bulgaria) Stefani Stoeva	14–21, 9–21	(silver) Runner-up

Mixed doubles
Year	Tournament	Partner	Opponent	Score	Result
2005	Welsh International	(Scotland) Watson Briggs	(India) Valiyaveetil Diju (India) Jwala Gutta	15–12, 2–15, 9–15	(silver) Runner-up
2006	Hungarian International	(Scotland) Watson Briggs	(Russia) Vladimir Malkov (Russia) Anastasia Russkikh	12–21, 17–21	(silver) Runner-up
2007	Scottish International	(England) Robert Blair	(Russia) Aleksandr Nikolaenko (Russia) Nina Vislova	15–21, 22–20, 21–9	(gold) Winner
2009	Finnish International	(England) Robin Middleton	(Russia) Vitalij Durkin (Russia) Nina Vislova	18–21, 13–21	(silver) Runner-up
2010	Irish International	(England) Chris Adcock	(Denmark) Christian John Skovgaard (Denmark) Britta Andersen	21–13, 21–11	(gold) Winner
2010	Scottish International	(England) Chris Adcock	(Germany) Till Zander (Germany) Gitte Köhler	21–10, 21–12	(gold) Winner
2010	Italian International	(England) Chris Adcock	(Estonia) Gert Kunka (Sweden) Amanda Högström	21–14, 21–15	(gold) Winner
2012	Finnish Open	(England) Chris Adcock	(Denmark) Anders Skaarup Rasmussen (Denmark) Sara Thygesen	22–24, 21–12, 21–13	(gold) Winner
2013	French International	(Scotland) Robert Blair	(England) Marcus Ellis (England) Alyssa Lim	21–17, 21–17	(gold) Winner
2013	Kharkiv International	(Scotland) Robert Blair	(Denmark) Kim Astrup (Denmark) Maria Helsbøl	20–22, 21–9, 21–18	(gold) Winner
2013	Bulgarian International	(Scotland) Robert Blair	(Poland) Robert Mateusiak (Poland) Agnieszka Wojtkowska	21–17, 21–15	(gold) Winner
2013	Irish Open	(Scotland) Robert Blair	(Netherlands) Jacco Arends (Netherlands) Selena Piek	21–9, 19–21, 13–21	(silver) Runner-up
2014	Swedish Masters	(Scotland) Robert Blair	(Germany) Peter Käsbauer (Germany) Isabel Herttrich	24–22, 14–21, 21–16	(gold) Winner
2014	Orléans International	(Scotland) Robert Blair	(Denmark) Niclas Nøhr (Denmark) Sara Thygesen	21–13, 19–21, 21–18	(gold) Winner
2014	Spanish Open	(Scotland) Robert Blair	(Poland) Robert Mateusiak (Poland) Agnieszka Wojtkowska	21–13, 14–21, 21–16	(gold) Winner

BWF International Challenge tournament
BWF International Series tournament
