= Kim Ha-na =

South Korean badminton player (born 1989)

Kim Ha-na 김하나
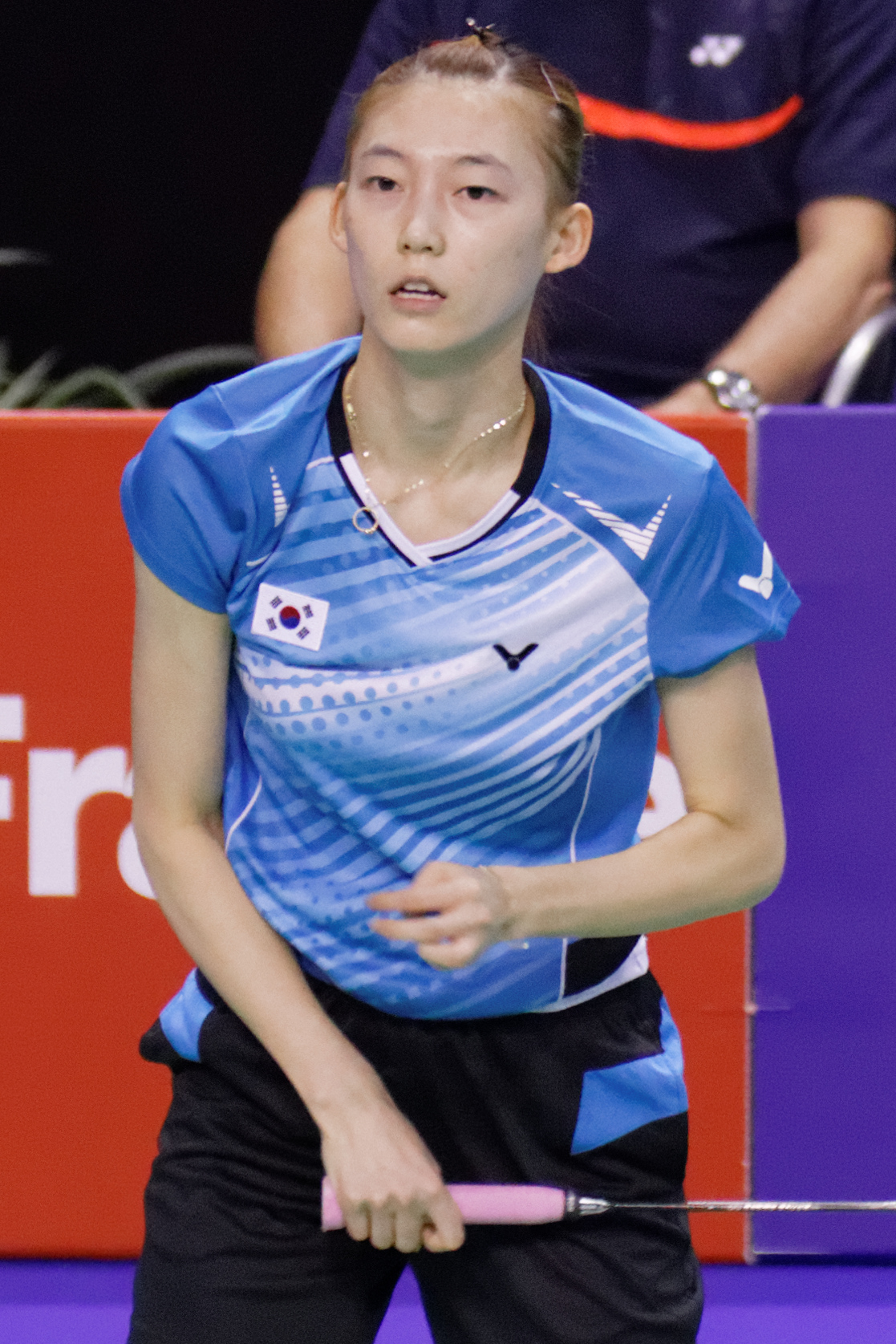
- Kim Ha-na at the 2013 French Super Series

Personal information
- Born: 27 December 1989 (age 36) Jeju, South Korea
- Height: 1.72 m (5 ft 8 in)
- Weight: 51 kg (112 lb)

Sport
- Country: South Korea
- Sport: Badminton
- Handedness: Right

Women's & mixed doubles
- Highest ranking: 5 (WD 16 January 2014); 1 (XD with Ko Sung-hyun 22 September 2016); 5 (XD with Seo Seung-jae 17 May 2018)
- BWF profile
Medal record
Women's badminton
Representing South Korea
Uber Cup
Silver medal – second place	2012 Wuhan	Women's team
Bronze medal – third place	2014 New Delhi	Women's team
Sudirman Cup
Gold medal – first place	2017 Gold Coast	Mixed team
Silver medal – second place	2013 Kuala Lumpur	Mixed team
Bronze medal – third place	2015 Donggguan	Mixed team
Asian Games
Silver medal – second place	2014 Incheon	Women's team
Asian Championships
Gold medal – first place	2013 Taipei	Mixed doubles
Silver medal – second place	2014 Gimcheon	Women's doubles
Bronze medal – third place	2016 Wuhan	Mixed doubles
Asia Mixed Team Championships
Silver medal – second place	2017 Ho Chi Minh	Mixed team
World Junior Championships
Gold medal – first place	2006 Incheon	Mixed team

Kim Ha-na (Korean: 김하나; pronounced [kim.ɦa.na] or [kim] [ha.na]; born 27 December 1989) is a South Korean badminton player. She was the mixed doubles gold medalist at the 2013 Asian Championships, and was part of the national team that won the Sudirman Cup in 2017. Kim won her first Superseries title at the 2012 India Open in the women's doubles event. She reached a career high of world no. 1 in the mixed doubles in September 2016.

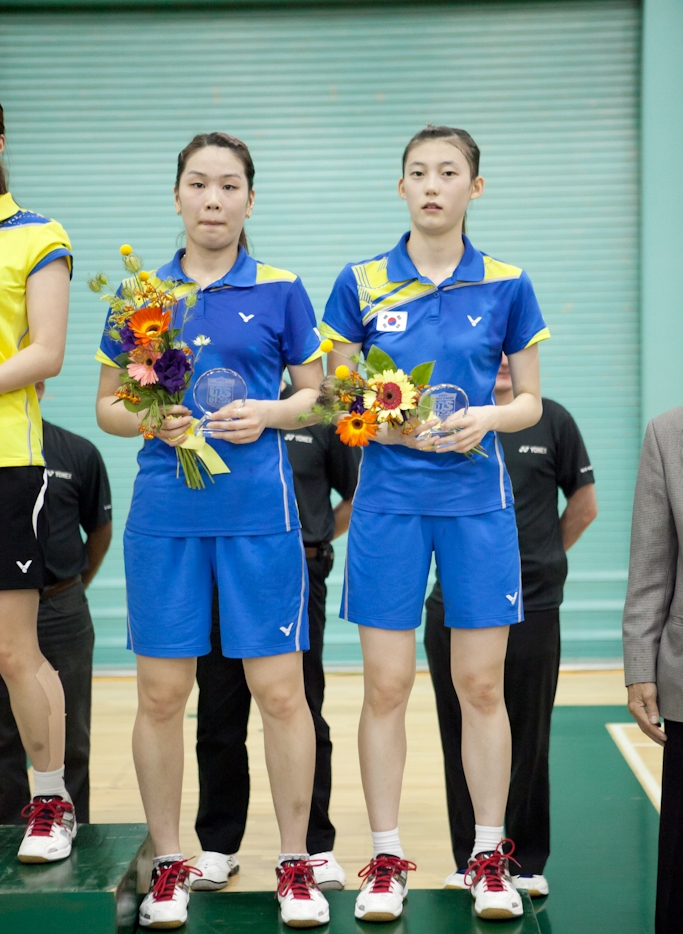
Kim Ha-na (right) with Jung Kyung-eun became the runner-up at the 2011 U.S. Open.

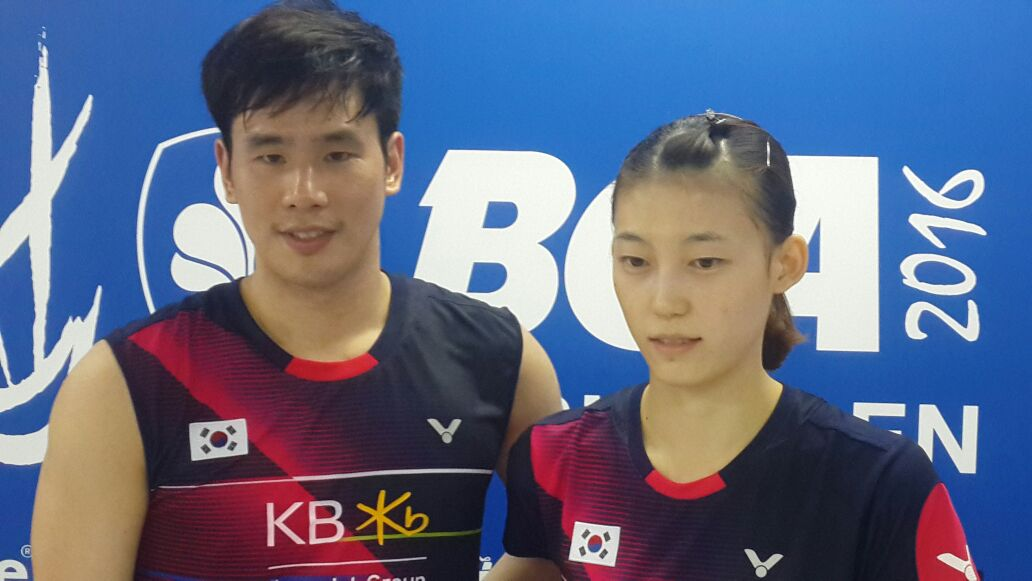
Kim Ha-na (right) with her partner in mixed doubles Ko Sung-hyun (June 2016).

== Sport career ==
At the 2012 Summer Olympics, Kim and her partner Jung Kyung-eun, along with Ha Jung-eun, Kim Min-jung, Wang Xiaoli, Yu Yang, Meiliana Jauhari and Greysia Polii were disqualified from the competition because their efforts were not focused on winning their matches, and their conduct was in a way that was harmful and violent to the sport. They were also accused of trying to lose in order to manipulate the draw. Kim and her partner Jung Kyung-eun played against China's Wang Xiaoli and Yu Yang. South Korea filed an appeal to the Badminton World Federation at the Olympics, but it was rejected.

She competed at the 2014 Asian Games.

She competed at the 2016 Rio Olympics, in the mixed doubles with Ko Sung-hyun. They were knocked out in the quarterfinals by the Chinese pair of Xu Chen and Ma Jin.

In 2017, she helped the Korean national team compete at the 2017 Sudirman Cup and won that tournament.

== Achievements ==
=== Asian Championships ===
Women's doubles
Year	Venue	Partner	Opponent	Score	Result
2014	Gimcheon Indoor Stadium, Gimcheon, South Korea	(South Korea) Jung Kyung-eun	(China) Luo Ying (China) Luo Yu	18–21, 18–21	Silver

Mixed doubles
Year	Venue	Partner	Opponent	Score	Result
2013	Taipei Arena, Taipei, Chinese Taipei	(South Korea) Ko Sung-hyun	(China) Zhang Nan (China) Zhao Yunlei	22–20, 21–17	Gold
2016	Wuhan Sports Center Gymnasium, Wuhan, China	(South Korea) Ko Sung-hyun	(China) Zhang Nan (China) Zhao Yunlei	19–21, 11–21	Bronze

=== BWF World Tour (1 title) ===
The BWF World Tour, which was announced on 19 March 2017 and implemented in 2018, is a series of elite badminton tournaments sanctioned by the Badminton World Federation (BWF). The BWF World Tour is divided into levels of World Tour Finals, Super 1000, Super 750, Super 500, Super 300, and the BWF Tour Super 100.

Mixed doubles
Year	Tournament	Level	Partner	Opponent	Score	Result
2020	Spain Masters	Super 300	(South Korea) Kim Sa-rang	(France) Thom Gicquel (France) Delphine Delrue	15–21, 21–11, 21–10	(gold) Winner

=== BWF Superseries (6 titles, 8 runners-up) ===
The BWF Superseries, launched on 14 December 2006 and implemented in 2007, is a series of elite badminton tournaments, sanctioned by Badminton World Federation (BWF). BWF Superseries has two level such as Superseries and Superseries Premier. A season of Superseries features twelve tournaments around the world, which introduced since 2011, with successful players invited to the Superseries Finals held at the year end.

Women's doubles
Year	Tournament	Partner	Opponent	Score	Result
2012	India Open	(South Korea) Jung Kyung-eun	(China) Bao Yixin (China) Zhong Qianxin	21–17, 21–18	(gold) Winner
2014	India Open	(South Korea) Jung Kyung-eun	(China) Tang Yuanting (China) Yu Yang	10–21, 21–13, 16–21	(silver) Runner-up
2017	Japan Open	(South Korea) Kong Hee-yong	(Japan) Misaki Matsutomo (Japan) Ayaka Takahashi	18–21, 16–21	(silver) Runner-up

Mixed doubles
Year	Tournament	Partner	Opponent	Score	Result
2013	India Open	(South Korea) Ko Sung-hyun	(Indonesia) Tontowi Ahmad (Indonesia) Liliyana Natsir	16–21, 13–21	(silver) Runner-up
2014	India Open	(South Korea) Ko Sung-hyun	(Denmark) Joachim Fischer Nielsen (Denmark) Christinna Pedersen	16–21, 21–18, 18–21	(silver) Runner-up
2014	Australian Open	(South Korea) Ko Sung-hyun	(Germany) Michael Fuchs (Germany) Birgit Michels	21–16, 21–17	(gold) Winner
2015	Denmark Open	(South Korea) Ko Sung-hyun	(Indonesia) Tontowi Ahmad (Indonesia) Liliyana Natsir	20–22, 21–18, 21–9	(gold) Winner
2015	French Open	(South Korea) Ko Sung-hyun	(Indonesia) Praveen Jordan (Indonesia) Debby Susanto	21–10, 15–21, 21–19	(gold) Winner
2015	Dubai World Superseries Finals	(South Korea) Ko Sung-hyun	(England) Chris Adcock (England) Gabby Adcock	14–21, 17–21	(silver) Runner-up
2016	Singapore Open	(South Korea) Ko Sung-hyun	(China) Xu Chen (China) Ma Jin	21–17, 21–14	(gold) Winner
2016	Indonesia Open	(South Korea) Ko Sung-hyun	(China) Xu Chen (China) Ma Jin	15–21, 21–16, 13–21	(silver) Runner-up
2016	Japan Open	(South Korea) Ko Sung-hyun	(China) Zheng Siwei (China) Chen Qingchen	10–21, 15–21	(silver) Runner-up
2016	Korea Open	(South Korea) Ko Sung-hyun	(China) Zheng Siwei (China) Chen Qingchen	21–14, 21–19	(gold) Winner
2016	French Open	(South Korea) Ko Sung-hyun	(China) Zheng Siwei (China) Chen Qingchen	16–21, 15–21	(silver) Runner-up

BWF Super Series Finals tournament
BWF Super Series Premier tournament
BWF Super Series tournament

=== BWF Grand Prix (11 titles, 7 runners-up) ===
The BWF Grand Prix had two levels, the BWF Grand Prix and Grand Prix Gold. It was a series of badminton tournaments sanctioned by the Badminton World Federation (BWF) which was held from 2007 to 2017.

Women's doubles
Year	Tournament	Partner	Opponent	Score	Result
2010	Korea Grand Prix	(South Korea) Eom Hye-won	(South Korea) Jung Kyung-eun (South Korea) Yoo Hyun-young	16–21, 21–18, 19–21	(silver) Runner-up
2011	Swiss Open	(South Korea) Jung Kyung-eun	(South Korea) Ha Jung-eun (South Korea) Kim Min-jung	12–21, 13–21	(silver) Runner-up
2011	U.S. Open	(South Korea) Jung Kyung-eun	(South Korea) Ha Jung-eun (South Korea) Kim Min-jung	21–14, 20–22, 18–21	(silver) Runner-up
2011	Macau Open	(South Korea) Jung Kyung-eun	(South Korea) Eom Hye-won (South Korea) Jang Ye-na	8–4 retired	(gold) Winner
2012	German Open	(South Korea) Jung Kyung-eun	(China) Tang Jinhua (China) Xia Huan	21–23, 13–21	(silver) Runner-up
2013	German Open	(South Korea) Jung Kyung-eun	(China) Ma Jin (China) Tang Jinhua	11–21, 21–14, 21–13	(gold) Winner
2013	Swiss Open	(South Korea) Jung Kyung-eun	(South Korea) Lee So-hee (South Korea) Shin Seung-chan	23–21, 21–16	(gold) Winner
2013	Chinese Taipei Open	(South Korea) Jung Kyung-eun	(South Korea) Lee So-hee (South Korea) Shin Seung-chan	Walkover	(gold) Winner
2014	German Open	(South Korea) Jung Kyung-eun	(Japan) Misaki Matsutomo (Japan) Ayaka Takahashi	21–23, 22–24	(silver) Runner-up

Mixed doubles
Year	Tournament	Partner	Opponent	Score	Result
2014	German Open	(South Korea) Ko Sung-hyun	(Scotland) Robert Blair (Scotland) Imogen Bankier	15–21, 18–21	(silver) Runner-up
2015	Chinese Taipei Open	(South Korea) Ko Sung-hyun	(South Korea) Shin Baek-cheol (South Korea) Chae Yoo-jung	21–16, 21–18	(gold) Winner
2015	Korea Masters	(South Korea) Ko Sung-hyun	(South Korea) Shin Baek-cheol (South Korea) Chae Yoo-jung	19–21, 21–17, 21–19	(gold) Winner
2016	German Open	(South Korea) Ko Sung-hyun	(South Korea) Shin Baek-cheol (South Korea) Chae Yoo-jung	21–19, 21–12	(gold) Winner
2016	Korea Masters	(South Korea) Ko Sung-hyun	(Thailand) Dechapol Puavaranukroh (Thailand) Sapsiree Taerattanachai	21–19, 21–16	(gold) Winner
2017	Chinese Taipei Open	(South Korea) Seo Seung-jae	(Chinese Taipei) Wang Chi-lin (Chinese Taipei) Lee Chia-hsin	22–20, 21–10	(gold) Winner
2017	U.S. Open	(South Korea) Seo Seung-jae	(South Korea) Kim Won-ho (South Korea) Shin Seung-chan	16–21, 21–14, 21–11	(gold) Winner
2017	Macau Open	(South Korea) Seo Seung-jae	(China) Zheng Siwei (China) Huang Yaqiong	14–21, 11–21	(silver) Runner-up
2017	Korea Masters	(South Korea) Seo Seung-jae	(South Korea) Choi Sol-gyu (South Korea) Chae Yoo-jung	17–21, 21–13, 21–18	(gold) Winner

BWF Grand Prix Gold tournament
BWF Grand Prix tournament

=== BWF International Challenge/Series (3 titles, 2 runners-up) ===
Women's doubles
Year	Tournament	Partner	Opponent	Score	Result
2025	Malaysia International	(South Korea) Jeon Jui	(Japan) Yuna Kato (Japan) Hina Osawa	15–10, 15–10	(gold) Winner
2025 (II)	Vietnam International	(South Korea) Jeon Jui	(Vietnam) Nguyen Thi Ngoc Lan (Vietnam) Than Van Anh	21–12, 22–20	(gold) Winner

Mixed doubles
Year	Tournament	Partner	Opponent	Score	Result
2019	Dubai International	(South Korea) Kim Sa-rang	(Russia) Rodion Alimov (Russia) Alina Davletova	20–22, 16–21	(silver) Runner-up
2019	Hungarian International	(South Korea) Kim Sa-rang	(Denmark) Mathias Christiansen (Denmark) Alexandra Bøje	21–12, 21–15	(gold) Winner
2019	Nepal International	(South Korea) Kim Sa-rang	(Thailand) Supak Jomkoh (Thailand) Supissara Paewsampran	18–21, 16–21	(silver) Runner-up

BWF International Challenge tournament
BWF International Series tournament
