= Xu Chen =

Chinese badminton player (born 1984)

Xu Chen 徐晨
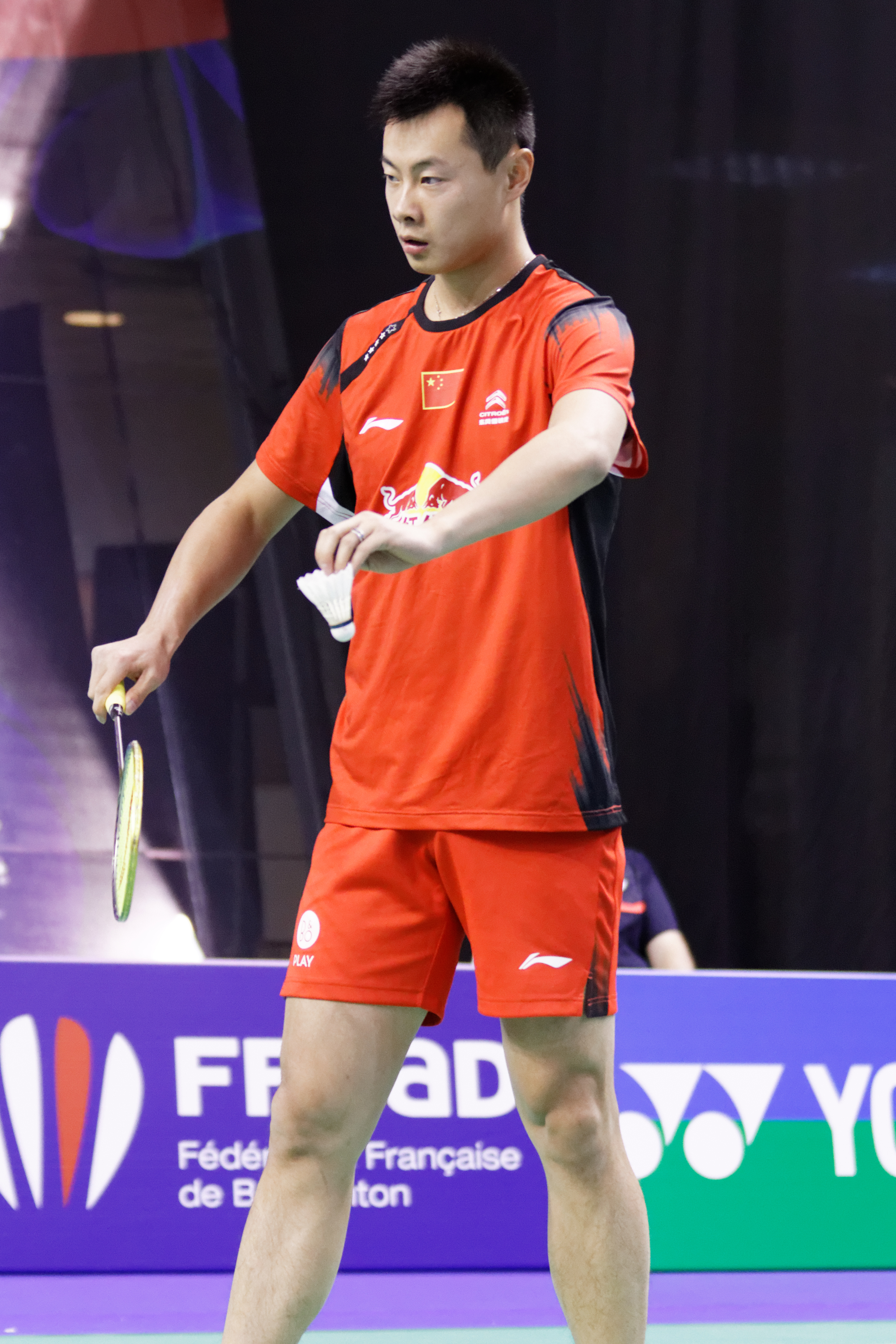
- Xu Chen at the 2013 French Super Series

Personal information
- Born: 29 November 1984 (age 41) Jiangsu, China
- Height: 1.90 m (6 ft 3 in)
- Weight: 80 kg (176 lb)
- Spouse: Pan Pan (m. 2011)

Sport
- Country: China
- Sport: Badminton
- Handedness: Right

Men's & mixed doubles
- Highest ranking: 3 (MD with Guo Zhendong 8 July 2010); 1 (XD with Ma Jin 12 September 2013)
- BWF profile
Medal record
Men's badminton
Representing China
Olympic Games
Silver medal – second place	2012 London	Mixed doubles
World Championships
Silver medal – second place	2013 Guangzhou	Mixed doubles
Silver medal – second place	2014 Copenhagen	Mixed doubles
Bronze medal – third place	2010 Paris	Men's doubles
Bronze medal – third place	2011 London	Mixed doubles
Bronze medal – third place	2015 Jakarta	Mixed doubles
Sudirman Cup
Gold medal – first place	2009 Guangzhou	Mixed team
Gold medal – first place	2011 Qingdao	Mixed team
Gold medal – first place	2013 Kuala Lumpur	Mixed team
Gold medal – first place	2015 Donggun	Mixed team
Thomas Cup
Gold medal – first place	2010 Kuala Lumpur	Men's team
Asian Games
Gold medal – first place	2010 Guangzhou	Men's team
Silver medal – second place	2014 Incheon	Men's team
Bronze medal – third place	2014 Incheon	Mixed doubles
Asian Championships
Silver medal – second place	2007 Johor Bahru	Mixed doubles
Silver medal – second place	2011 Chengdu	Mixed doubles
Silver medal – second place	2012 Qingdao	Mixed doubles
Bronze medal – third place	2011 Chengdu	Men's doubles
Bronze medal – third place	2015 Wuhan	Mixed doubles
East Asian Games
Gold medal – first place	2013 Tianjin	Mixed doubles
Gold medal – first place	2013 Tianjin	Men's team
Summer Universiade
Silver medal – second place	2007 Bangkok	Mixed team
World Junior Championships
Gold medal – first place	2002 Pretoria	Mixed team

Xu Chen (Chinese: 徐晨; pinyin: Xú Chén; born 29 November 1984) is a badminton player from China. In 2010, he (along with his partner Guo Zhendong) was ranked within the top 10 men's badminton doubles in the world. At the 2012 Summer Olympics, he competed in the mixed doubles with Ma Jin, winning the silver medal. In the final they lost to Zhang Nan and Zhao Yunlei, also from China. He married a former Chinese national badminton team player, Pan Pan in 2011 and held a wedding ceremony on 3 June 2014.

== Achievements ==
=== Olympic Games ===
Mixed doubles
Year	Venue	Partner	Opponent	Score	Result
2012	Wembley Arena, London, Great Britain	(China) Ma Jin	(China) Zhang Nan (China) Zhao Yunlei	11–21, 17–21	Silver

=== BWF World Championships ===
Men's doubles
Year	Venue	Partner	Opponent	Score	Result
2010	Stade Pierre de Coubertin, Paris, France	(China) Guo Zhendong	(Malaysia) Koo Kien Keat (Malaysia) Tan Boon Heong	14–21, 18–21	Bronze

Mixed doubles
Year	Venue	Partner	Opponent	Score	Result
2011	Wembley Arena, London, England	(China) Ma Jin	(China) Zhang Nan (China) Zhao Yunlei	17–21, retired	Bronze
2013	Tianhe Sports Center, Guangzhou, China	(China) Ma Jin	(Indonesia) Tontowi Ahmad (Indonesia) Liliyana Natsir	21–13, 16–21, 20–22	Silver
2014	Ballerup Super Arena, Copenhagen, Denmark	(China) Ma Jin	(China) Zhang Nan (China) Zhao Yunlei	12–21, 23–21, 13–21	Silver
2015	Istora Senayan, Jakarta, Indonesia	(China) Ma Jin	(China) Liu Cheng (China) Bao Yixin	13–21, 21–15, 19–21	Bronze

=== Asian Games ===
Mixed doubles
Year	Venue	Partner	Opponent	Score	Result
2014	Gyeyang Gymnasium, Incheon, South Korea	(China) Ma Jin	(Indonesia) Tontowi Ahmad (Indonesia) Liliyana Natsir	12–21, 10–21	Bronze

=== Asian Championships ===
Men's doubles
Year	Venue	Partner	Opponent	Score	Result
2011	Sichuan Gymnasium, Chengdu, China	(China) Zhang Nan	(China) Cai Yun (China) Fu Haifeng	19–21, 15–21	Bronze

Mixed doubles
Year	Venue	Partner	Opponent	Score	Result
2007	Stadium Bandaraya, Johor Bahru, Malaysia	(China) Zhao Tingting	(China) He Hanbin (China) Yu Yang	20–22, 15–21	Silver
2011	Sichuan Gymnasium, Chengdu, China	(China) Ma Jin	(China) Zhang Nan (China) Zhao Yunlei	21–15, 15–21, 23–25	Silver
2012	Qingdao Sports Centre Conson Stadium; Qingdao, China	(China) Ma Jin	(China) Zhang Nan (China) Zhao Yunlei	13–21, 12–21	Silver
2015	Wuhan Sports Center Gymnasium; Wuhan, China	(China) Ma Jin	(Indonesia) Tontowi Ahmad (Indonesia) Liliyana Natsir	12–21, 15–21	Bronze

=== East Asian Games ===
Mixed doubles
Year	Venue	Partner	Opponent	Score	Result
2013	Binhai New Area Dagang Gymnasium; Tianjin, China	(China) Ma Jin	(Hong Kong) Lee Chun Hei (Hong Kong) Chau Hoi Wah	17–21, 21–13, 21–13	Gold

=== BWF Superseries ===
The BWF Superseries, which was launched on 14 December 2006 and implemented in 2007, is a series of elite badminton tournaments, sanctioned by the Badminton World Federation (BWF). BWF Superseries levels are Superseries and Superseries Premier. A season of Superseries consists of twelve tournaments around the world that have been introduced since 2011. Successful players are invited to the Superseries Finals, which are held at the end of each year.

Men's doubles
Year	Tournament	Partner	Opponent	Score	Result
2008	China Masters	(China) Sun Junjie	(Indonesia) Markis Kido (Indonesia) Hendra Setiawan	17–21, 22–24	(silver) Runner-up
2008	French Open	(China) Cai Yun	(Indonesia) Markis Kido (Indonesia) Hendra Setiawan	15–21, 12–21	(silver) Runner-up
2009	China Masters	(China) Guo Zhendong	(China) Cai Yun (China) Fu Haifeng	Walkover	(gold) Winner
2010	Malaysia Open	(China) Guo Zhendong	(Malaysia) Koo Kean Keat (Malaysia) Tan Boon Heong	15–21, 21–17, 16–21	(silver) Runner-up

Mixed doubles
Year	Tournament	Partner	Opponent	Score	Result
2008	China Open	(China) Zhao Yunlei	(South Korea) Lee Yong-dae (South Korea) Lee Hyo-jung	16–21, 15–21	(silver) Runner-up
2010	China Masters	(China) Yu Yang	(China) Tao Jiaming (China) Tian Qing	11–21, 14–21	(silver) Runner-up
2011	All England Open	(China) Ma Jin	(Thailand) Sudket Prapakamol (Thailand) Saralee Thoungthongkam	21–13, 21–9	(gold) Winner
2011	China Masters	(China) Ma Jin	(South Korea) Yoo Yeon-seong (South Korea) Jang Ye-na	21–13, 21–16	(gold) Winner
2011	Denmark Open	(China) Ma Jin	(Denmark) Joachim Fischer Nielsen (Denmark) Christinna Pedersen	20–22, 16–21	(silver) Runner-up
2011	French Open	(China) Ma Jin	(Denmark) Joachim Fischer Nielsen (Denmark) Christinna Pedersen	17–21, 14–21	(silver) Runner-up
2011	World Superseries Finals	(China) Ma Jin	(China) Zhang Nan (China) Zhao Yunlei	13–21, 15–21	(silver) Runner-up
2012	Korea Open	(China) Ma Jin	(South Korea) Lee Yong-dae (South Korea) Ha Jung-eun	21–12, 19–21, 21–10	(gold) Winner
2012	Malaysia Open	(China) Ma Jin	(China) Zhang Nan (China) Zhao Yunlei	12–21, 9–21	(silver) Runner-up
2012	China Masters	(China) Ma Jin	(China) Qiu Zihan (China) Tang Jinhua	14–21, 21–11, 21–10	(gold) Winner
2012	Denmark Open	(China) Ma Jin	(Indonesia) Tontowi Ahmad (Indonesia) Liliyana Natsir	23–21, 24–26, 21–11	(gold) Winner
2012	French Open	(China) Ma Jin	(China) Qiu Zihan (China) Bao Yixin	21–17, 19–21, 21–18	(gold) Winner
2012	China Open	(China) Ma Jin	(Malaysia) Chan Peng Soon (Malaysia) Goh Liu Ying	21–15, 21–17	(gold) Winner
2012	Hong Kong Open	(China) Ma Jin	(China) Zhang Nan (China) Zhao Yunlei	17–21, 17–21	(silver) Runner-up
2013	Korea Open	(China) Ma Jin	(China) Zhang Nan (China) Zhao Yunlei	21–13, 16–21, 13–21	(silver) Runner-up
2013	Japan Open	(China) Ma Jin	(China) Zhang Nan (China) Zhao Yunlei	Walkover	(silver) Runner-up
2013	French Open	(China) Ma Jin	(China) Zhang Nan (China) Zhao Yunlei	26–28, 18–21	(silver) Runner-up
2014	Korea Open	(China) Ma Jin	(China) Zhang Nan (China) Zhao Yunlei	18–21, 18–21	(silver) Runner-up
2014	Malaysia Open	(China) Ma Jin	(Denmark) Joachim Fischer Nielsen (Denmark) Christinna Pedersen	21–11, 17–21, 21–13	(gold) Winner
2014	Indonesia Open	(China) Ma Jin	(Denmark) Joachim Fischer Nielsen (Denmark) Christinna Pedersen	21–18, 16–21, 14–21	(silver) Runner-up
2014	Denmark Open	(China) Ma Jin	(Indonesia) Tontowi Ahmad (Indonesia) Liliyana Natsir	22–20, 21–15	(gold) Winner
2014	Hong Kong Open	(China) Ma Jin	(China) Zhang Nan (China) Zhao Yunlei	14–21, 19–21	(silver) Runner-up
2015	Malaysia Open	(China) Ma Jin	(China) Zhang Nan (China) Zhao Yunlei	16–21, 14–21	(silver) Runner-up
2015	Indonesia Open	(China) Ma Jin	(China) Zhang Nan (China) Zhao Yunlei	21–17, 21–16	(gold) Winner
2016	Singapore Open	(China) Ma Jin	(South Korea) Ko Sung-hyun (South Korea) Kim Ha-na	17–21, 14–21	(silver) Runner-up
2016	Indonesia Open	(China) Ma Jin	(South Korea) Ko Sung-hyun (South Korea) Kim Ha-na	21–15, 16–21, 21–13	(gold) Winner

BWF Super Series Finals tournament
BWF Super Series Premier tournament
BWF Super Series tournament

=== BWF Grand Prix ===
The BWF Grand Prix had two levels, the BWF Grand Prix and Grand Prix Gold. It was a series of badminton tournaments sanctioned by the Badminton World Federation (BWF) which was held from 2007 to 2017. The World Badminton Grand Prix sanctioned by International Badminton Federation (IBF) from 1983 to 2006.

Mixed doubles
Year	Tournament	Partner	Opponent	Score	Result
2006	China Open	(China) Zhao Tingting	(China) Xie Zhongbo (China) Zhang Yawen	19–21, 5–21	(silver) Runner-up
2008	German Open	(China) Zhao Tingting	(China) Zheng Bo (China) Gao Ling	11–21, 10–21	(silver) Runner-up
2008	Macau Open	(China) Zhao Yunlei	(Hong Kong) Yohan Hadikusumo Wiratama (Hong Kong) Chau Hoi Wah	21–15, 21–16	(gold) Winner
2009	German Open	(China) Zhao Yunlei	(China) Zheng Bo (China) Ma Jin	21–18, 23–21	(gold) Winner
2009	Malaysia Grand Prix Gold	(China) Zhao Yunlei	(China) Zheng Bo (China) Ma Jin	5–5 retired	(silver) Runner-up
2011	Indonesia Grand Prix Gold	(China) Ma Jin	(China) He Hanbin (China) Bao Yixin	19–21, 4–1 retired	(silver) Runner-up
2016	China Masters	(China) Ma Jin	(China) Zheng Siwei (China) Chen Qingchen	21–17, 21–15	(gold) Winner

BWF Grand Prix Gold tournament
BWF Grand Prix tournament
