= 1999 IBF World Championships – Men's doubles =

Men's doubles at the 1999 IBF World Championships
- Venue: Brøndby Arena
- Location: Copenhagen, Denmark
- Dates: May 10, 1999 – May 23, 1999

Medalists
gold medal	Ha Tae-kwon; Kim Dong-moon	South Korea
silver medal	Lee Dong-soo; Yoo Yong-sung	South Korea
bronze medal	Zhang Wei; Zhang Jun	China
bronze medal	Simon Archer; Nathan Robertson	England

The 1999 IBF World Championships (World Badminton Championships) were held in Copenhagen, Denmark, between 10 May and 23 May 1999. Following the results of the men's doubles.

== Main stage ==
=== Section 1 ===
First round
(South Korea) Ha Tae-kwon (South Korea) Kim Dong-moon	15	15
(South Africa) Johan Kleingeld (South Africa) Gavin Polmans	3	1
(England) Anthony Clark (England) Ian Sullivan	15	9	15
(Chinese Taipei) Chien Yu-hsun (Chinese Taipei) Huang Shih-chung	9	15	13
(Thailand) Tesana Panvisvas (Thailand) Pramote Teerawiwatana	15	15
(Suriname) Oscar Brandon (Suriname) Derrick Stjeward	1	2
(Malaysia) Chew Choon Eng (Malaysia) Lee Wan Wah	15	17
(Iceland) Thorsteinn Pall Haengsson (Iceland) Broddi Kristjansson	11	16
(Indonesia) Tony Gunawan (Indonesia) Candra Wijaya	w.o.
(Latvia) Livins Edijs (Latvia) Martins Kazemaks
(Denmark) Lars Paaske (Denmark) Thomas Stavngaard	15	13	15
(Netherlands) Norbert Van Barneveld (Netherlands) Jurgen van Leeuwen	4	15	4
(Sweden) Peter Axelsson (Sweden) Pär-Gunnar Jönsson	15	15
(Finland) Ville Kinnunen (Finland) Ilkka Nyqvist	5	6
(China) Yang Ming (China) Yu Yang	15	11	15
(India) Jaseel P. Ismail (India) Vincent Lobo	11	15	6

Second round
(South Korea) Ha Tae-kwon (South Korea) Kim Dong-moon	15	15
(England) Anthony Clark (England) Ian Sullivan	3	5
(Thailand) Tesana Panvisvas (Thailand) Pramote Teerawiwatana	9	15	15
(Malaysia) Chew Choon Eng (Malaysia) Lee Wan Wah	15	9	9
(Indonesia) Tony Gunawan (Indonesia) Candra Wijaya	15	15
(Denmark) Lars Paaske (Denmark) Thomas Stavngaard	5	8
(Sweden) Peter Axelsson (Sweden) Pär-Gunnar Jönsson	16	17	15
(China) Yang Ming (China) Yu Yang	17	16	12

Third round
(South Korea) Ha Tae-kwon (South Korea) Kim Dong-moon	15	15
(Thailand) Tesana Panvisvas (Thailand) Pramote Teerawiwatana	7	9
(Indonesia) Tony Gunawan (Indonesia) Candra Wijaya	15	15
(Sweden) Peter Axelsson (Sweden) Pär-Gunnar Jönsson	7	4

Quarterfinals
(South Korea) Ha Tae-kwon (South Korea) Kim Dong-moon	12	15	15
(Indonesia) Tony Gunawan (Indonesia) Candra Wijaya	15	7	10

=== Section 2 ===
First round
(China) Zhang Wei (China) Zhang Jun	7	15	15
(Chinese Taipei) Lee Sung Yuan (Chinese Taipei) Lin Wei Hsiang	15	5	10
(England) Graham Hurrell (England) Peter Jeffrey	15	15
(Portugal) Hugo Rodrigues (Portugal) Marco Vasconcelos	6	10
(Denmark) Jim Laugesen (Denmark) Michael Sogaard	14	15	15
(Japan) Shinji Ohta (Japan) Takuya Takehana	17	2	9
(Poland) Michal Logosz (Poland) Robert Mateusiak	15	15
(France) Manuel Dubrulle (France) Vincent Laigle	5	7
(Indonesia) Eng Hian (Indonesia) Flandy Limpele	15	15
(Belgium) Patrick Boonen (Belgium) David Vandewinkel	7	6
(Canada) Brent Olynyk (Canada) Iain Sydie	17	15
(Germany) Boris Reichel (Germany) Joachim Tesche	14	9
(China) Wang Wei (China) Cheng Rui	15	15
(Hong Kong) Ma Che Kong (Hong Kong) Yau Tsz Yuk	11	9
(United States) Mike Edstrom (United States) Chris Hales	4	15	15
(Mauritius) Stephan Beeharry (Mauritius) Denis Constantin	15	8	5

Second round
(China) Zhang Wei (China) Zhang Jun	15	15
(England) Graham Hurrell (England) Peter Jeffrey	10	4
(Denmark) Jim Laugesen (Denmark) Michael Sogaard	15	15
(Poland) Michal Logosz (Poland) Robert Mateusiak	3	5
(Indonesia) Eng Hian (Indonesia) Flandy Limpele	15	15
(Canada) Brent Olynyk (Canada) Iain Sydie	9	3
(China) Wang Wei (China) Cheng Rui	15	15
(United States) Mike Edstrom (United States) Chris Hales	8	7

Third round
(China) Zhang Wei (China) Zhang Jun	15	10	15
(Denmark) Jim Laugesen (Denmark) Michael Sogaard	5	15	4
(Indonesia) Eng Hian (Indonesia) Flandy Limpele	15	15
(China) Wang Wei (China) Cheng Rui	9	3

Quarterfinals
(China) Zhang Wei (China) Zhang Jun	15	3	15
(Indonesia) Eng Hian (Indonesia) Flandy Limpele	11	15	13

=== Section 3 ===
First round
(South Korea) Lee Dong-soo (South Korea) Yoo Yong-sung	17	15
(Denmark) Michael Lamp (Denmark) Jonas Rasmussen	14	8
(England) Chris Hunt (England) Julian Robertson	15	15
(Slovakia) Pavol Mecar (Slovakia) Marian Sulko	1	2
(Malaysia) Cheah Soon Kit (Malaysia) Choong Tan Fook	15	15
(Mexico) Luis Lopezllera (Mexico) Bernardo Monreal	3	2
(Austria) Harald Koch (Austria) Jürgen Koch	15	15
(Brazil) Guilherme Pardo (Brazil) Ricardo Trevelin	5	9
(Indonesia) Ricky Subagja (Indonesia) Rexy Mainaky	15	15
(Scotland) Alastair Gatt (Scotland) Craig Robertson	4	8
(Netherlands) Dennis Lens (Netherlands) Quinten van Dalm	15	15
(Iceland) Tryggvi Nielsen (Iceland) Sveinn Solvason	2	10
(Chinese Taipei) Lee Wei-Jen (Indonesia) Victo Wibowo	15	15
(Belarus) Mikhail Korchouk (Belarus) Vitali Shmakov	2	8
(Poland) Przemyslaw Wacha (Poland) Piotr Zoladek	15	15
(Bulgaria) Konstantin Dobrev (Bulgaria) Tzvetozar Kolev

Second round
(South Korea) Lee Dong-soo (South Korea) Yoo Yong-sung	15	15
(England) Chris Hunt (England) Julian Robertson	12	11
(Malaysia) Cheah Soon Kit (Malaysia) Choong Tan Fook	15	15
(Austria) Harald Koch (Austria) Jürgen Koch	13	13
(Indonesia) Ricky Subagja (Indonesia) Rexy Mainaky	15	15
(Netherlands) Dennis Lens (Netherlands) Quinten van Dalm	7	4
(Chinese Taipei) Lee Wei-Jen (Indonesia) Victo Wibowo	15	15
(Poland) Przemyslaw Wacha (Poland) Piotr Zoladek	4	11

Third round
(South Korea) Lee Dong-soo (South Korea) Yoo Yong-sung	15	15
(Malaysia) Cheah Soon Kit (Malaysia) Choong Tan Fook	4	10
(Indonesia) Ricky Subagja (Indonesia) Rexy Mainaky	15	15
(Chinese Taipei) Lee Wei-Jen (Indonesia) Victo Wibowo	4	11

Quarterfinals
(South Korea) Lee Dong-soo (South Korea) Yoo Yong-sung	11	15	15
(Indonesia) Ricky Subagja (Indonesia) Rexy Mainaky	15	11	9

=== Section 4 ===
First round
(England) Simon Archer (England) Nathan Robertson	15	15
(Sweden) Henrik Andersson (Sweden) Fredrik Bergström	4	2
(Bulgaria) Mihail Popov (Bulgaria) Svetoslav Stoyanov	15	15
(Russia) Pavel Uvarov (Russia) Vjacheslav Vorobjev	9	6
(Denmark) Jens Eriksen (Denmark) Jesper Larsen	15	15
(Spain) Jose Antonio Crespo (Spain) Sergio Llopis	7	2
(Germany) Michael Helber (Germany) Björn Siegemund	15	15
(Mauritius) Michael Adams (Mauritius) Eddy Clarisse	7	6
(China) Chen Qiqiu (China) Yu Jinhao	15	15	15
(Indonesia) Antonius Budi Ariantho (Indonesia) Denny Kantono	17	3	13
(Ukraine) Valerj Strelcov (Ukraine) Konstantin Tatranov	17	15
(Sri Lanka) Thushara Edirisinghe (Sri Lanka) Duminda Jayakody	14	6
(Malaysia) Chan Chong Ming (Malaysia) Jeremy Gan	15	15
(Japan) Keita Masuda (Japan) Tadashi Ohtsuka	10	1
(United States) Mark Manha (Indonesia) Ardy Wiranata	15	13	15
(New Zealand) Anton Gargiulo (Brazil) Leandro Santos	2	15	7

Second round
(England) Simon Archer (England) Nathan Robertson	15	15
(Bulgaria) Mihail Popov (Bulgaria) Svetoslav Stoyanov	6	5
(Denmark) Jens Eriksen (Denmark) Jesper Larsen	15	15
(Germany) Michael Helber (Germany) Björn Siegemund	6	6
(China) Chen Qiqiu (China) Yu Jinhao	15	15
(Ukraine) Valerj Strelcov (Ukraine) Konstantin Tatranov	6	4
(Malaysia) Chan Chong Ming (Malaysia) Jeremy Gan	15	15
(United States) Mark Manha (Indonesia) Ardy Wiranata	8	6

Third round
(England) Simon Archer (England) Nathan Robertson	15	8	15
(Denmark) Jens Eriksen (Denmark) Jesper Larsen	5	15	12
(China) Chen Qiqiu (China) Yu Jinhao	15	15
(Malaysia) Chan Chong Ming (Malaysia) Jeremy Gan	13	5

Quarterfinals
(England) Simon Archer (England) Nathan Robertson	15	15
(China) Chen Qiqiu (China) Yu Jinhao	7	13

== Final stage ==
Quarterfinals
12	(South Korea) Ha Tae-kwon (South Korea) Kim Dong-moon	12	15	15
(Indonesia) Tony Gunawan (Indonesia) Candra Wijaya	15	7	10
11	(China) Zhang Wei (China) Zhang Jun	15	3	15
(Indonesia) Eng Hian (Indonesia) Flandy Limpele	11	15	13
10	(South Korea) Lee Dong-soo (South Korea) Yoo Yong-sung	11	15	15
(Indonesia) Ricky Subagja (Indonesia) Rexy Mainaky	15	11	9
13	(England) Simon Archer (England) Nathan Robertson	15	15
(China) Chen Qiqiu (China) Yu Jinhao	7	13

Semifinals
12	(South Korea) Ha Tae-kwon (South Korea) Kim Dong-moon	15	17
11	(China) Zhang Wei (China) Zhang Jun	6	15
10	(South Korea) Lee Dong-soo (South Korea) Yoo Yong-sung	15	15
13	(England) Simon Archer (England) Nathan Robertson	11	8

Finals
12	(South Korea) Ha Tae-kwon (South Korea) Kim Dong-moon	15	15
10	(South Korea) Lee Dong-soo (South Korea) Yoo Yong-sung	5	5
