= 1997 Badminton Asia Cup =

Badminton championships

Sampoerna (King) Asia Cup 1997
Tournament information
- Location: Istora Senayan, Jakarta, Indonesia
- Dates: February 19–February 23

The 1997 Badminton Asia Cup; officially called as Sampoerna (King) Asia Cup 1997 was the 1st edition of the Badminton Asia Cup. It was held in Istora Senayan tennis indoor stadium, Jakarta, Indonesia from 19 February to 23 February with total prize money of 150,000 US Dollars. Tournament consisted of total of three matches in every team encounter, with format of Men's singles, Men's doubles and a second Men's singles match. Countries participated in this tournaments were Indonesia, Malaysia, India, Thailand, South Korea, Chinese Taipei, Hong Kong & Japan. Winning team & top seeded Indonesia got US$80,000 while runner-up Malaysian team got US$40,000. Third placed Chinese Taipei got a total of US$20,000 and 4th ranked South Korea bagged a total prize of US$10,000.

== Group results ==
=== Group A ===
1) Indonesia V/s India

Indonesia
3
Jakarta
19 February 1997

India
0

| | | | 1 | 2 | 3 |
|---|---|---|---|---|---|
| 1 | (Indonesia) (India) | Indra Wijaya; Pullela Gopichand | 15; 9 | 15; 4 |
| 2 | (Indonesia) (India) | Sigit Budiarto / Candra Wijaya; Jaseel P. Ismail / Vijaydeep Singh | 15; 1 | 15; 2 |
| 3 | (Indonesia) (India) | Budi Santoso; Siddharth Jain | 15; 2 | 18; 13 |

2) Chinese Taipei V/s Thailand

Chinese Taipei
2
Jakarta
19 February 1997

Thailand
1

| | | | 1 | 2 | 3 |
|---|---|---|---|---|---|
| 1 | (Chinese Taipei) (Thailand) | Fung Permadi; Natapol Sarawan | 15; 9 | 15; 0 |
| 2 | (Chinese Taipei) (Thailand) | Chien Yu-hsun / Huang Shih-chung; Pramote Teerawiwatana / Siripong Siripool | 9; 15 | 2; 15 |
| 3 | (Chinese Taipei) (Thailand) | Chang Jeng-shyuang; Anuphap Theeraratsakul | 15; 12 | 15; 6 |

3) Indonesia V/s Thailand

Indonesia
3
Jakarta
20 February 1997

Thailand
0

| | | | 1 | 2 | 3 |
|---|---|---|---|---|---|
| 1 | (Indonesia) (Thailand) | Budi Santoso; Natapol Sarawan | 15; 2 | 15; 4 |
| 2 | (Indonesia) (Thailand) | Sigit Budiarto / Candra Wijaya; Pramote Teerawiwatana / Siripong Siripool | 18; 13 | 11; 15 | 15; 5 |
| 3 | (Indonesia) (Thailand) | Jeffer Rosobin; Anuphap Theeraratsakul | 18; 14 | 15; 13 |

4) Chinese Taipei V/s India

Chinese Taipei
3
Jakarta
20 February 1997

India
0

| | | | 1 | 2 | 3 |
|---|---|---|---|---|---|
| 1 | (Chinese Taipei) (India) | Fung Permadi; Pullela Gopichand | 15; 8 | 15; 3 |
| 2 | (Chinese Taipei) (India) | Chien Yu-hsun / Huang Shih-chung; Jaseel P. Ismail / Vijaydeep Singh | 15; 3 | 15; 13 |
| 3 | (Chinese Taipei) (India) | Chang Jeng-shyuang; Siddharth Jain | 15; 6 | 15; 7 |

5) Indonesia V/s Chinese Taipei

Indonesia
2
Jakarta
21 February 1997

Chinese Taipei
1

| | | | 1 | 2 | 3 |
|---|---|---|---|---|---|
| 1 | (Indonesia) (Chinese Taipei) | Indra Wijaya; Chang Jeng-shyuang | 15; 10 | 11; 15 | 15; 0 |
| 2 | (Indonesia) (Chinese Taipei) | Sigit Budiarto / Candra Wijaya; Chien Yu-hsun / Huang Shih-chung | 15; 6 | 15; 7 |
| 3 | (Indonesia) (Chinese Taipei) | Jeffer Rosobin; Chien Yu-hsiu | 15; 10 | 10; 15 | 8; 15 |

6) India V/s Thailand

India
2
Jakarta
21 February 1997

Thailand
1

| | | | 1 | 2 | 3 |
|---|---|---|---|---|---|
| 1 | (India) (Thailand) | Pullela Gopichand; Natapol Sarawan | 15; 11 | 15; 1 |
| 2 | (India) (Thailand) | Jaseel P. Ismail / Vijaydeep Singh; Pramote Teerawiwatana / Siripong Siripool | 4; 15 | 8; 15 |
| 3 | (India) (Thailand) | Siddharth Jain; Anuphap Theeraratsakul | 15; 1 | 15; 4 |

=== Group B ===
1) Malaysia V/s Hong Kong

Malaysia
3
Jakarta
19 February 1997

Hong Kong
0

| | | | 1 | 2 | 3 |
|---|---|---|---|---|---|
| 1 | (Malaysia) (Hong Kong) | Ong Ewe Hock; Tam Kai Chuen | 15; 6 | 5; 15 | 15; 6 |
| 2 | (Malaysia) (Hong Kong) | Lee Wan Wah / Tan Kim Her; Chan Kin Man / Ma Che Kong | 15; 11 | 15; 2 |
| 3 | (Malaysia) (Hong Kong) | Pang Chen; Liu Kwok Wa | 15; 2 | 15; 1 |

2) South Korea vs Japan

South Korea
3
Jakarta
19 February 1997

Japan
0

| | | | 1 | 2 | 3 |
|---|---|---|---|---|---|
| 1 | (South Korea) (Japan) | Park Sung-woo; Takahiro Suka | 15; 6 | 5; 15 | 15; 6 |
| 2 | (South Korea) (Japan) | Lee Dong-soo / Yoo Yong-sung; Shinji Ohta / Takuya Takehana | 15; 5 | 15; 8 |
| 3 | (South Korea) (Japan) | Han Dong-sung; Yuzo Kubota | 15; 5 | 15; 7 |

3) Malaysia V/s Japan

Malaysia
3
Jakarta
20 February 1997

Japan
0

| | | | 1 | 2 | 3 |
|---|---|---|---|---|---|
| 1 | (Malaysia) (Japan) | Ong Ewe Hock; Takahiro Suka | 15; 4 | 15; 1 |
| 2 | (Malaysia) (Japan) | Lee Wan Wah / Tan Kim Her; Shinji Ohta / Takuya Takehana | 15; 12 | 15; 7 |
| 3 | (Malaysia) (Japan) | Pang Chen; Yuzo Kubota | 15; 8 | 15; 6 |

4) South Korea vs Hong Kong

South Korea
3
Jakarta
20 February 1997

Hong Kong
0

| | | | 1 | 2 | 3 |
|---|---|---|---|---|---|
| 1 | (South Korea) (Hong Kong) | Park Sung-woo; Tam Kai Chuen | 15; 7 | 15; 10 |
| 2 | (South Korea) (Hong Kong) | Lee Dong-soo / Yoo Yong-sung; Chow Kin Man / Ma Che Kong | 15; 7 | 15; 9 |
| 3 | (South Korea) (Hong Kong) | Kim Chul-joong; Yau Tsz Yuk | 15; 2 | 15; 9 |

5) South Korea V/s Malaysia

South Korea
1
Jakarta
21 February 1997

Malaysia
2

| | | | 1 | 2 | 3 |
|---|---|---|---|---|---|
| 1 | (South Korea) (Malaysia) | Park Sung-woo; Pang Chen | 12; 15 | 3; 15 |
| 2 | (South Korea) (Malaysia) | Lee Dong-soo / Yoo Yong-sung; Lee Wan Wah / Tan Kim Her | 15; 12 | 15; 11 |
| 3 | (South Korea) (Malaysia) | Han Dong-sung; Wong Choong Hann | 7; 15 | 10; 15 |

6) Japan V/s Hong Kong

Japan
2
Jakarta
21 February 1997

Hong Kong
1

| | | | 1 | 2 | 3 |
|---|---|---|---|---|---|
| 1 | (Japan) (Hong Kong) | Takahiro Suka; Tam Kai Chuen | 4; 15 | 9; 15 |
| 2 | (Japan) (Hong Kong) | Shinji Ohta / Takuya Takehana; Chow Kin Man / Ma Che Kong | 15; 7 | 15; 12 |
| 3 | (Japan) (Hong Kong) | Yuzo Kubota; Yau Tsz Yuk | 10; 15 | 18; 17 | 15; 3 |

== Semifinals ==
1) Indonesia V/s South Korea

Indonesia
3
Jakarta
22 February 1997

South Korea
0

| | | | 1 | 2 | 3 |
|---|---|---|---|---|---|
| 1 | (Indonesia) (South Korea) | Indra Wijaya; Park Sung-woo | 15; 6 | 15; 8 |
| 2 | (Indonesia) (South Korea) | Sigit Budiarto / Candra Wijaya; Lee Dong-soo / Jung Jae-sung | 15; 7 | 15; 12 |
| 3 | (Indonesia) (South Korea) | Budi Santoso; Kim Chul-joong | 15; 9 | 15; 7 |

2) Chinese Taipei V/s Malaysia

Chinese Taipei
1
Jakarta
22 February 1997

Malaysia
2

| | | | 1 | 2 | 3 |
|---|---|---|---|---|---|
| 1 | (Chinese Taipei) (Malaysia) | Fung Permadi; Ong Ewe Hock | 15; 9 | 13; 18 | 13; 15 |
| 2 | (Chinese Taipei) (Malaysia) | Chien Yu-hsun / Huang Shih-chung; Tan Kim Her / Lee Wan Wah | 8; 15 | 15; 5 | 15; 10 |
| 3 | (Chinese Taipei) (Malaysia) | Chien Yu-hsiu; Pang Chen | 11; 15 | 6; 15 |

== Final ==
Indonesia V/s Malaysia

Indonesia
3
Jakarta
23 February 1997

Malaysia
0

| | | | 1 | 2 | 3 |
|---|---|---|---|---|---|
| 1 | (Indonesia) (Malaysia) | Indra Wijaya; Ong Ewe Hock | 18; 13 | 4; 15 | 15; 11 |
| 2 | (Indonesia) (Malaysia) | Sigit Budiarto / Candra Wijaya; Wong Choong Hann / Lee Chee Leong | 15; 7 | 15; 12 |
| 3 | (Indonesia) (Malaysia) | Budi Santoso; Pang Chen | 15; 2 | 15; 2 |

== Bronze medal tie ==
Chinese Taipei V/s South Korea

Chinese Taipei
2
Jakarta
23 February 1997

South Korea
1

| | | | 1 | 2 | 3 |
|---|---|---|---|---|---|
| 1 | (Chinese Taipei) (South Korea) | Fung Permadi; Park Sung-woo | 15; 5 | 15; 8 |
| 2 | (Chinese Taipei) (South Korea) | Chien Yu-hsun / Huang Shih-chung; Lee Dong-soo / Yoo Yong-sung | 13; 15 | 7; 15 |
| 3 | (Chinese Taipei) (South Korea) | Chang Jeng-shyuang; Kim Chul-joong | 15; 9 | 15; 4 |
