= Kim Yong-hyun (badminton) =

South Korean badminton player (born 1978)

Personal information
- Born: 13 May 1978 (age 48) Incheon, South Korea
- Height: 1.83 m (6 ft 0 in)
- Weight: 73 kg (161 lb)

Sport
- Country: South Korea
- Sport: Badminton
- Handedness: Right
- Event: Men's & mixed doubles

Men's & mixed doubles
- BWF profile
Medal record
Men's badminton
Representing South Korea
Sudirman Cup
| Gold medal – first place | 2003 Eindhoven | Mixed team |
Thomas Cup
| Bronze medal – third place | 2004 Jakarta | Men's team |
Asian Championships
| Bronze medal – third place | 2003 Jakarta | Mixed doubles |
World Junior Championships
| Bronze medal – third place | 1996 Silkeborg | Boys' doubles |

- Kim Yong-hyun
- Hangul: 김용현
- Hanja: 金鎔玄
- RR: Gim Yonghyeon
- MR: Kim Yonghyŏn

Kim Yong-hyun (born 13 May 1978) is a badminton player from South Korea.

Kim competed for Korea in badminton at the 2004 Summer Olympics in men's doubles with partner Yim Bang-eun. They had a bye in the first round and defeated Lars Paaske and Jonas Rasmussen of Denmark in the second. In the quarterfinals, Kim and Yim lost to Eng Hian and Flandy Limpele of Indonesia 15-1, 15-10.

Kim also competed in mixed doubles with partner Lee Hyo-jung. They had a bye in the first run and were defeated by Jens Eriksen and Mette Schjoldager of Denmark in the round of 16.

== Achievements ==
=== Asian Championships ===
Mixed doubles
| Year | Venue | Partner | Opponent | Score | Result |
|---|---|---|---|---|---|
| 2003 | Tennis Indoor Gelora Bung Karno; Jakarta, Indonesia | (South Korea) Lee Hyo-jung | (Indonesia) Anggun Nugroho (Indonesia) Eny Widiowati | 13–15, 8–15 | Bronze |

=== World Junior Championships ===
Boys' doubles
| Year | Venue | Partner | Opponent | Score | Result |
|---|---|---|---|---|---|
| 1996 | Silkeborg Hallerne; Silkeborg, Denmark | (South Korea) Yim Bang-eun | (Chinese Taipei) Huang Shih-chung (Chinese Taipei) Chien Yu-hsiu | 11–15, 7–15 | Bronze |

=== IBF Grand Prix ===
The World Badminton Grand Prix sanctioned by International Badminton Federation since 1983.

Men's doubles
| Year | Tournament | Partner | Opponent | Score | Result |
|---|---|---|---|---|---|
| 2003 | Dutch Open | (South Korea) Yim Bang-eun | (South Korea) Ha Tae-kwon (South Korea) Kim Dong-moon | 2–15, 2–15 | (silver) Runner-up |

Mixed doubles
| Year | Tournament | Partner | Opponent | Score | Result |
|---|---|---|---|---|---|
| 2004 | Malaysia Open | (South Korea) Lee Hyo-jung | (China) Zhang Jun (China) Gao Ling | 2–15, 11–15 | (silver) Runner-up |
| 2004 | Korea Open | (South Korea) Lee Hyo-jung | (South Korea) Kim Dong-moon (South Korea) Ra Kyung-min | 5–15, 11–15 | (silver) Runner-up |
| 2004 | All England Open | (South Korea) Lee Hyo-jung | (South Korea) Kim Dong-moon (South Korea) Ra Kyung-min | 8–15, 15–17 | (silver) Runner-up |
| 2003 | Denmark Open | (South Korea) Lee Hyo-jung | (South Korea) Kim Dong-moon (South Korea) Ra Kyung-min | 16–17, 10–15 | (silver) Runner-up |
| 2003 | Dutch Open | (South Korea) Lee Hyo-jung | (South Korea) Kim Dong-moon (South Korea) Ra Kyung-min | 4–15, 2–15 | (silver) Runner-up |
| 2003 | Korea Open | (South Korea) Lee Hyo-jung | (South Korea) Kim Dong-moon (South Korea) Ra Kyung-min | 5–11, 4–11 | (silver) Runner-up |
| 2003 | Swiss Open | (South Korea) Lee Hyo-jung | (Denmark) Jens Eriksen (Denmark) Mette Schjoldager | 7–11, 11–9, 5–11 | (silver) Runner-up |

=== IBF International ===
Men's doubles
| Year | Tournament | Partner | Opponent | Score | Result |
|---|---|---|---|---|---|
| 1999 | Norwegian International | (South Korea) Yim Bang-eun | (Denmark) Thomas Rojkjaer Jensen (Denmark) Tommy Sørensen | 15–4, 15–9 | (gold) Winner |
| 1999 | Hungarian International | (South Korea) Yim Bang-eun | (South Korea) Jung Sung-gyun (South Korea) Park Young-duk | 15–1, 15–4 | (gold) Winner |

Mixed doubles
| Year | Tournament | Partner | Opponent | Score | Result |
|---|---|---|---|---|---|
| 1999 | Norwegian International | (South Korea) Yim Kyung-jin | (Denmark) Ove Svejstrup (Denmark) Britta Andersen | 9–15, 15–8, 15–9 | (gold) Winner |
| 1999 | Hungarian International | (South Korea) Yim Kyung-jin | (South Korea) Yim Bang-eun (South Korea) Lee Hyo-jung | 5–15, 15–9, 15–3 | (gold) Winner |
