= 2003 IBF World Championships – Mixed doubles =

Mixed doubles at the 2003 IBF World Championships
- Venue: National Indoor Arena
- Location: Birmingham, United Kingdom
- Dates: July 28, 2003 – August 3, 2003

Medalists
gold medal	Kim Dong-moon; Ra Kyung-min	South Korea
silver medal	Zhang Jun; Gao Ling	China
bronze medal	Jonas Rasmussen; Rikke Olsen	Denmark
bronze medal	Chen Qiqiu; Zhao Tingting	China

The 2003 IBF World Championships (World Badminton Championships) took place in the National Indoor Arena in Birmingham, England, between July 28 and August 3, 2003. Following the results in the mixed doubles.

== Main stage ==
=== Section 1 ===
First round
(South Korea) Kim Dong-moon (South Korea) Ra Kyung-min	15	15
(Czech Republic) Jiri Skocdopole (Czech Republic) Hana Procházková	0	3
(South Korea) Lee Jae-jin (South Korea) Hwang Yu-mi	15	15
(England) Graham Hurrell (England) Joanne Wright	8	11
(Denmark) Michael Lamp (Denmark) Ann-Lou Jørgensen
bye
(Wales) Liam Ingram (Wales) Kerry Ann Sheppard
bye
(Denmark) Lars Paaske (Denmark) Pernille Harder	15	17
(Russia) Nikolaj Zuev (Russia) Marina Yakusheva	4	14
(Chinese Taipei) Cheng Wen-Hsing (Chinese Taipei) Tsai Chia-Hsin	15	15
(United States) Mathew Fogarty (United States) Lina Taft	5	6
(Denmark) Jens Eriksen (Denmark) Mette Schjoldager
bye
(Hong Kong) Yau Tsz Yuk (Hong Kong) Louisa Koon Wai Chee
bye

Second round
(South Korea) Kim Dong-moon (South Korea) Ra Kyung-min	15	15
(South Korea) Lee Jae-jin (South Korea) Hwang Yu-mi	5	7
(Denmark) Michael Lamp (Denmark) Ann-Lou Jørgensen	15	15
(Wales) Liam Ingram (Wales) Kerry Ann Sheppard	2	6
(Denmark) Lars Paaske (Denmark) Pernille Harder	15	15
(Chinese Taipei) Cheng Wen-Hsing (Chinese Taipei) Tsai Chia-Hsin	6	9
(Denmark) Jens Eriksen (Denmark) Mette Schjoldager	15	15
(Hong Kong) Yau Tsz Yuk (Hong Kong) Louisa Koon Wai Chee	2	9

Third round
(South Korea) Kim Dong-moon (South Korea) Ra Kyung-min	11	15	15
(Denmark) Michael Lamp (Denmark) Ann-Lou Jørgensen	15	7	4
(Denmark) Lars Paaske (Denmark) Pernille Harder	15	15
(Denmark) Jens Eriksen (Denmark) Mette Schjoldager	9	12

Quarterfinals
(South Korea) Kim Dong-moon (South Korea) Ra Kyung-min	15	15
(Denmark) Lars Paaske (Denmark) Pernille Harder	8	1

=== Section 2 ===
First round
(China) Chen Qiqiu (China) Zhao Tingting	15	15
(Austria) Roman Zirnwald (Austria) Simone Prutsch	2	2
(Germany) Kristof Hopp (Germany) Kathrin Piotrowski	15	15
(Bulgaria) Julian Hristov (Bulgaria) Diana Dimova	5	2
(China) Chen Lin (China) Sang Yang	15	5	15
(Spain) José Antonio Crespo (Spain) Dolores Marco	5	15	9
(Indonesia) Nova Widianto (Indonesia) Vita Marissa
bye
(England) Nathan Robertson (England) Gail Emms
bye
(Germany) Thomas Tesche (Germany) Carina Mette
bye
(Sweden) Fredrik Bergström (Sweden) Johanna Persson	15	15
(Canada) Mike Beres (Canada) Kara Solmundson	1	7
(Japan) Tadashi Ohtsuka (Japan) Shizuka Yamamoto
(Thailand) Khunakorn Sudhisodhi (Thailand) Saralee Thungthongkam

Second round
(China) Chen Qiqiu (China) Zhao Tingting	15	15
(Germany) Kristof Hopp (Germany) Kathrin Piotrowski	5	4
(China) Chen Lin (China) Sang Yang	17	12	17
(Indonesia) Nova Widianto (Indonesia) Vita Marissa	16	15	14
(England) Nathan Robertson (England) Gail Emms	15	15
(Germany) Thomas Tesche (Germany) Carina Mette	8	4
(Sweden) Fredrik Bergström (Sweden) Johanna Persson	15	15
(Japan) Tadashi Ohtsuka (Japan) Shizuka Yamamoto	7	2

Third round
(China) Chen Qiqiu (China) Zhao Tingting
(China) Chen Lin (China) Sang Yang
(England) Nathan Robertson (England) Gail Emms	15	15
(Sweden) Fredrik Bergström (Sweden) Johanna Persson	4	13

Quarterfinals
(China) Chen Qiqiu (China) Zhao Tingting	15	15
(England) Nathan Robertson (England) Gail Emms	11	9

=== Section 3 ===
First round
(China) Zhang Jun (China) Gao Ling
bye
(Greece) Theodoros Velkos (Greece) Chrisa Georgali
bye
(England) Robert Blair (England) Natalie Munt
(Sweden) Jörgen Olsson (Sweden) Frida Andreasson
(Malaysia) Chew Choon Eng (Malaysia) Chin Eei Hui	15	17
(Germany) Björn Siegemund (Germany) Nicol Pitro	13	14
(South Korea) Lee Hyo-jung (South Korea) Kim Yong-hyun	15	15
(China) Zheng Bo (China) Zhang Jiewen	11	12
(Hong Kong) Albertus Susanto Njoto (Hong Kong) Wang Chen
(United States) Mike Chansawangpuvana (United States) Eva Lee	4	8
(Indonesia) Trikus Heryanto (Indonesia) Emma Ermawati
bye
(Wales) Robyn Ashworth (Wales) Richard Williams
bye

Second round
(China) Zhang Jun (China) Gao Ling	15	15
(Greece) Theodoros Velkos (Greece) Chrisa Georgali	4	1
(England) Robert Blair (England) Natalie Munt	15	15
(Malaysia) Chew Choon Eng (Malaysia) Chin Eei Hui	2	6
(South Korea) Lee Hyo-jung (South Korea) Kim Yong-hyun	17	17
(Hong Kong) Albertus Susanto Njoto (Hong Kong) Wang Chen	15	14
(Indonesia) Trikus Heryanto (Indonesia) Emma Ermawati	15	15
(Wales) Robyn Ashworth (Wales) Richard Williams	1	2

Third round
(China) Zhang Jun (China) Gao Ling	15	15
(England) Robert Blair (England) Natalie Munt	4	2
(South Korea) Lee Hyo-jung (South Korea) Kim Yong-hyun	15	7	15
(Indonesia) Trikus Heryanto (Indonesia) Emma Ermawati	7	15	3

Quarterfinals
(China) Zhang Jun (China) Gao Ling	15	15
(South Korea) Lee Hyo-jung (South Korea) Kim Yong-hyun	6	1

=== Section 4 ===
First round
(Denmark) Jonas Rasmussen (Denmark) Rikke Olsen
bye
(England) Simon Archer (Scotland) Kirsteen McEwan
bye
(France) Svetoslav Stoyanov (France) Victoria Wright	15	15
(Canada) Philippe Bourret (Canada) Denyse Julien	7	13
(Bulgaria) Konstantin Dobrev (Bulgaria) Petya Nedeltcheva	15	15
(Wales) Matthew Hughes (Wales) Joanne Muggeridge	5	12
(Indonesia) Anggun Nugroho (Indonesia) Eny Widiowati	15	15
(Philippines) Kennevic Asuncion (Philippines) Kennie Asuncion	6	9
(Japan) Norio Imai (Japan) Chikako Nakayama	15	15
(Slovenia) Andrej Pohar (Slovenia) Maja Pohar	3	6
(Netherlands) Chris Bruil (Netherlands) Lotte Bruil-Jonathans
bye
(Indonesia) Robby Istanta (Indonesia) Yunita Tetty
bye

Second round
(Denmark) Jonas Rasmussen (Denmark) Rikke Olsen	15	15
(England) Simon Archer (Scotland) Kirsteen McEwan	10	2
(France) Svetoslav Stoyanov (France) Victoria Wright	15	15
(Bulgaria) Konstantin Dobrev (Bulgaria) Petya Nedeltcheva	1	9
(Indonesia) Anggun Nugroho (Indonesia) Eny Widiowati	15	10	15
(Japan) Norio Imai (Japan) Chikako Nakayama	13	15	7
(Netherlands) Chris Bruil (Netherlands) Lotte Bruil-Jonathans	15	15
(Indonesia) Robby Istanta (Indonesia) Yunita Tetty	13	13

Third round
(Denmark) Jonas Rasmussen (Denmark) Rikke Olsen	15	15
(France) Svetoslav Stoyanov (France) Victoria Wright	1	5
(Indonesia) Anggun Nugroho (Indonesia) Eny Widiowati	15	17
(Netherlands) Chris Bruil (Netherlands) Lotte Bruil-Jonathans	12	14

Quarterfinals
(Denmark) Jonas Rasmussen (Denmark) Rikke Olsen	15	15
(Indonesia) Anggun Nugroho (Indonesia) Eny Widiowati	1	7

== Final stage ==
Quarterfinals
9	(South Korea) Kim Dong-moon (South Korea) Ra Kyung-min	15	15
(Denmark) Lars Paaske (Denmark) Pernille Harder	8	1
13	(China) Chen Qiqiu (China) Zhao Tingting	15	15
(England) Nathan Robertson (England) Gail Emms	11	9
1	(China) Zhang Jun (China) Gao Ling	15	15
(South Korea) Lee Hyo-jung (South Korea) Kim Yong-hyun	6	1
4	(Denmark) Jonas Rasmussen (Denmark) Rikke Olsen	15	15
(Indonesia) Anggun Nugroho (Indonesia) Eny Widiowati	1	7

Semifinals
9	(South Korea) Kim Dong-moon (South Korea) Ra Kyung-min	15	15
13	(China) Chen Qiqiu (China) Zhao Tingting	7	5
1	(China) Zhang Jun (China) Gao Ling	15	17
4	(Denmark) Jonas Rasmussen (Denmark) Rikke Olsen	3	15

Finals
9	(South Korea) Kim Dong-moon (South Korea) Ra Kyung-min	15	15
1	(China) Zhang Jun (China) Gao Ling	7	8
