= 2001 Badminton Asia Cup =

Badminton championships

Asia Cup 2001
Tournament information
- Location: Singapore Indoor Stadium, Singapore
- Dates: May 2–May 6

The 2001 Badminton Asia Cup was the 3rd edition of the Badminton Asia Cup. It was held in Singapore indoor stadium, Singapore from 2 May to 6 May with total prize money of 150,000 US Dollars. Tournament consisted of total of three matches in every team encounter, with format of Men's singles, Men's doubles and a second Men's singles match. Countries participated in this tournaments were Indonesia, Malaysia, Thailand, Hong Kong, South Korea, Singapore, Japan & China. Draw was conducted on 27 April 2001. Winning team China got US$80,000 while runner-up team South Korea got US$40,000. Indonesia finished third by defeating Thailand in Bronze medal tie and received a total of US$20,000 and 4th ranked Thai team settled with prize money of US$10,000.

== Group results ==
=== Group A ===
1) Indonesia V/s Singapore

Indonesia
3
Singapore Indoor Stadium
2 May 2001

Singapore
0

			1	2	3
1	(Indonesia) (Singapore)	Taufik Hidayat; Ronald Susilo	16; 17	17; 14	17; 16
2	(Indonesia) (Singapore)	Candra Wijaya / Sigit Budiarto; Patrick Lau Kim Pong / Amon Santoso	15; 10	15; 7
3	(Indonesia) (Singapore)	Hendrawan; Indra Wijaya	8; 15	15; 11	15; 11

2) South Korea V/s Hong Kong

South Korea
3
Singapore Indoor Stadium
2 May 2001

Hong Kong
0

			1	2	3
1	(South Korea) (Hong Kong)	Lee Hyun-il; Agus Hariyanto	15; 12	15; 9
2	(South Korea) (Hong Kong)	Lee Dong-soo / Yoo Yong-sung; Liu Kwok Wa / Albertus Susanto Njoto	15; 7	15; 10
3	(South Korea) (Hong Kong)	Shon Seung-mo; Tam Kai Chuen	15; 9	15; 3

3) Indonesia V/s Hong Kong

Indonesia
3
Singapore Indoor Stadium
3 May 2001

Hong Kong
0

			1	2	3
1	(Indonesia) (Hong Kong)	Taufik Hidayat; Agus Hariyanto	15; 8	15; 7
2	(Indonesia) (Hong Kong)	Candra Wijaya / Sigit Budiarto; Liu Kwok Wa / Albertus Susanto Njoto	15; 6	15; 5
3	(Indonesia) (Hong Kong)	Hendrawan; Tam Kai Chuen	11; 15	15; 8	15; 7

4) South Korea V/s Singapore

South Korea
2
Singapore Indoor Stadium
3 May 2001

Singapore
1

			1	2	3
1	(South Korea) (Singapore)	Lee Hyun-il; Ronald Susilo	15; 7	15; 13
2	(South Korea) (Singapore)	Lee Dong-soo / Yoo Yong-sung; Patrick Lau Kim Pong / Amon Santoso	15; 8	15; 9
3	(South Korea) (Singapore)	Shon Seung-mo; Indra Wijaya	13; 15	15; 8	12; 15

5) Indonesia V/s South Korea

Indonesia
2
Singapore Indoor Stadium
4 May 2001

South Korea
1

			1	2	3
1	(Indonesia) (South Korea)	Taufik Hidayat; Lee Hyun-il	3; 15	7; 15
2	(Indonesia) (South Korea)	Candra Wijaya / Sigit Budiarto; Lee Dong-soo / Jung Jae-sung	15; 2	15; 12
3	(Indonesia) (South Korea)	Hendrawan; Shon Seung-mo	15; 6	15; 7

6) Hong Kong V/s Singapore

Hong Kong
2
Singapore Indoor Stadium
4 May 2001

Singapore
1

			1	2	3
1	(Hong Kong) (Singapore)	Agus Hariyanto; Ronald Susilo	15; 12	15; 5
2	(Hong Kong) (Singapore)	Liu Kwok Wa / Albertus Susanto Njoto; Patrick Lau Kim Pong / Amon Santoso	15; 13	15; 9
3	(Hong Kong) (Singapore)	Tam Kai Chuen; Indra Wijaya	14; 17	15; 12	12; 15

=== Group B ===
1) Malaysia V/s Japan

Malaysia
3
Singapore Indoor Stadium
2 May 2001

Japan
0

			1	2	3
1	(Malaysia) (Japan)	Ong Ewe Hock; Hidetaka Yamada	17; 15	15; 3
2	(Malaysia) (Japan)	Chan Chong Ming / Chew Choon Eng; Keita Masuda / Tadashi Ōtsuka	15; 6	15; 9
3	(Malaysia) (Japan)	Yong Hock Kin; Shinya Ōtsuka	15; 9	15; 4

2) China V/s Thailand

China
1
Singapore Indoor Stadium
2 May 2001

Thailand
2

			1	2	3
1	(China) (Thailand)	Chen Hong; Boonsak Ponsana	15; 17	15; 8	4; 15
2	(China) (Thailand)	Zhang Jun / Zhang Wei; Pramote Teerawiwatana / Tesana Panvisvas	15; 6	12; 15	15; 3
3	(China) (Thailand)	Chen Yu; Anuphap Theeraratsakul	17; 14	12; 15	12; 15

3) Malaysia V/s Thailand

Malaysia
1
Singapore Indoor Stadium
3 May 2001

Thailand
2

			1	2	3
1	(Malaysia) (Thailand)	Wong Choong Hann; Boonsak Ponsana	15; 5	10; 15	10; 15
2	(Malaysia) (Thailand)	Chan Chong Ming / Chew Choon Eng; Pramote Teerawiwatana / Tesana Panvisvas	16; 17	12; 15
3	(Malaysia) (Thailand)	Yong Hock Kin; Anuphap Theeraratsakul	15; 11	15; 9

4) China V/s Japan

China
3
Singapore Indoor Stadium
3 May 2001

Japan
0

			1	2	3
1	(China) (Japan)	Chen Hong; Shinya Ōtsuka	15; 6	15; 8
2	(China) (Japan)	Zhang Jun / Zhang Wei; Yuzo Kubota / Takuya Katayama	15; 12	15; 3
3	(China) (Japan)	Chen Yu; Keita Masuda	15; 8	15; 12

5) Japan V/s Thailand

Japan
3
Singapore Indoor Stadium
4 May 2001

Thailand
0

			1	2	3
1	(Japan) (Thailand)	Hidetaka Yamada; Boonsak Ponsana	15; 5	15; 10
2	(Japan) (Thailand)	Takuya Katayama / Yuzo Kubota; Pramote Teerawiwatana / Tesana Panvisvas	15; 8	15; 8
3	(Japan) (Thailand)	Keita Masuda; Anuphap Theeraratsakul	15; 8	15; 4

6) China V/s Malaysia

China
2
Singapore Indoor Stadium
4 May 2001

Malaysia
1

			1	2	3
1	(China) (Malaysia)	Chen Hong; Ong Ewe Hock	15; 8	16; 17	15; 12
2	(China) (Malaysia)	Zhang Jun / Zhang Wei; Chan Chong Ming / Chew Choon Eng	15; 6	15; 5
3	(China) (Malaysia)	Chen Yu; Wong Choong Hann	1; 15	8; 15

== Semifinals ==
1) Indonesia V/s China

Indonesia
1
Singapore Indoor Stadium
5 May 2001

China
2

			1	2	3
1	(Indonesia) (China)	Taufik Hidayat; Chen Hong	15; 9	16; 17	12; 15
2	(Indonesia) (China)	Candra Wijaya / Sigit Budiarto; Zhang Jun / Zhang Wei	4; 15	15; 6	17; 15
3	(Indonesia) (China)	Hendrawan; Chen Yu	12; 15	15; 9	12; 15

2) South Korea V/s Thailand

South Korea
2
Singapore Indoor Stadium
5 May 2001

Thailand
0

			1	2	3
1	(South Korea) (Thailand)	Lee Hyun-il; Boonsak Ponsana	16; 17	15; 4	15; 11
2	(South Korea) (Thailand)	Yoo Yong-sung / Jung Jae-sung; Pramote Teerawiwatana / Tesana Panvisvas	15; 8	15; 12
3	(South Korea) (Thailand)	Shon Seung-mo; Anuphap Theeraratsakul

== Bronze medal tie ==
Indonesia V/s Thailand

Indonesia
2
Singapore Indoor Stadium
6 May 2001

Thailand
1

			1	2	3
1	(Indonesia) (Thailand)	Taufik Hidayat; Boonsak Ponsana	11; 15	15; 13	10; 15
2	(Indonesia) (Thailand)	Candra Wijaya / Sigit Budiarto; Pramote Teerawiwatana / Tesana Panvisvas	15; 5	11; 15	15; 5
3	(Indonesia) (Thailand)	Hendrawan; Anuphap Theeraratsakul	15; 10	15; 1

== Final ==
China V/s South Korea

China
3
Singapore Indoor Stadium
6 May 2001

South Korea
0

			1	2	3
1	(China) (South Korea)	Chen Hong; Lee Hyun-il	15; 12	15; 7
2	(China) (South Korea)	Zhang Jun / Zhang Wei; Jung Jae-sung / Lee Dong-soo	15; 5	15; 10
3	(China) (South Korea)	Chen Yu; Shon Seung-mo	15; 11	15; 13
