= Lu Ying (badminton) =

Chinese badminton player (born 1978)

Lu Ying 鲁莺
Personal information
- Born: 1978 (age 47–48)

Sport
- Country: China
- Sport: Badminton
- Event: Women's & mixed doubles

Women's & mixed doubles
- BWF profile (archived)
Medal record
Women's badminton
Representing China
World Junior Championships
Gold medal – first place	1996 Silkeborg	Mixed doubles
Silver medal – second place	1996 Silkeborg	Girls' doubles

Lu Ying (Chinese: 鲁莺; born 1978) was a former Chinese badminton player from Jiangsu. In the junior event, she participated at the 1996 World Junior Championships clinched a gold medal in the mixed doubles and a silver medal in the girls' doubles event. Partnered with Huang Nanyan, she won her first Grand Prix title in the women's doubles event at the 1999 U.S. Open. In 2000, she won the German Open with Huang Sui. At the 2005 National Games, she helps the Jiangsu team won the bronze medal in the women's team event.

== Achievements ==
=== World Junior Championships ===
Girls' doubles
Year	Venue	Partner	Opponent	Score	Result
1996	Silkeborg Hallerne; Silkeborg, Denmark	(China) Zhan Xubin	(China) Gao Ling (China) Yang Wei	12–15, 8–15	Silver

Mixed doubles
Year	Venue	Partner	Opponent	Score	Result
1996	Silkeborg Hallerne; Silkeborg, Denmark	(China) Wang Wei	(China) Cheng Rui (China) Gao Ling	15–4, 15–10	Gold

=== IBF World Grand Prix ===
The World Badminton Grand Prix sanctioned by International Badminton Federation (IBF) since 1983.

Women's doubles
Year	Tournament	Partner	Opponent	Score	Result
2000	German Open	(China) Huang Sui	(Japan) Yoshiko Iwata (Japan) Haruko Matsuda	15–5, 15–3	(gold) Winner
1999	Hong Kong Open	(China) Huang Sui	(China) Chen Lin (China) Jiang Xuelian	17–15, 12–15, 8–15	(silver) Runner-up
1999	U.S. Open	(China) Huang Nanyan	(Canada) Milaine Cloutier (Canada) Robbyn Hermitage	15–4, 15–9	(gold) Winner
1999	All England Open	(China) Huang Sui	(South Korea) Chung Jae-hee (South Korea) Ra Kyung-min	6–15, 8–15	(silver) Runner-up
1999	Swedish Open	(China) Huang Sui	(South Korea) Chung Jae-hee (South Korea) Ra Kyung-min	6–15, 11–15	(silver) Runner-up
