= Endra Mulyajaya =

Indonesian badminton player and coach

Personal information
- Born: Endra Mulyana Mulyajaya; 11 April

Sport
- Country: Indonesia
- Sport: Badminton
- Event: Men's & mixed doubles

Men's & mixed doubles
- BWF profile
Medal record
Men's badminton
Representing Indonesia
World Junior Championships
Bronze medal – third place	1996 Silkeborg	Boys' doubles

Endra Mulyana Mulyajaya (born 11 April) is an Indonesian former badminton player, who now works as a badminton coach. Trained at the Tangkas club, he clinched the boys' doubles titles at the Dutch and German partnered with Hadi Saputra in 1996, and also settled a bronze medal at the World Junior Championships in Silkeborg, Denmark. In 1998, he won the mixed doubles title at the Jakarta International tournament partnered with Angeline de Pauw. Together with Saputra, he finished as a semi finalists at the World Grand Prix tournament 1999 Thailand Open. In 2000, Mulyajaya teammed-up with Nova Widianto, the duo competed in the Grand Prix event and became a quarter finalists at the Indonesia, Malaysia and Dutch Open.

Mulyajaya started his career as a coach in Tangkas club for three years, and later join the Badminton Association of Indonesia for five years. In 2018, he moved as a coach in Turkey.

== Achievements ==
=== World Junior Championships ===
Boys' doubles
Year	Venue	Partner	Opponent	Score	Result
1996	Silkeborg Hallerne; Silkeborg, Denmark	(Indonesia) Hadi Saputra	(Malaysia) Jeremy Gan (Malaysia) Chan Chong Ming	14–18, 8–15	Bronze

=== IBF International ===
Men's doubles
Year	Tournament	Partner	Opponent	Score	Result
2001	Singapore International	(Indonesia) Luluk Hadiyanto	(Indonesia) Ade Lukas (Indonesia) Andreas Setiawan	15–9, 6–15, 12–15	(silver) Runner-up
1999	Singapore Satellite	(Indonesia) Hadi Saputra	(Indonesia) Ade Lukas (Indonesia) Hermono Yuwono	5–15, 15–2, 7–15	(silver) Runner-up

Mixed doubles
Year	Tournament	Partner	Opponent	Score	Result
1998	Jakarta International	(Indonesia) Angeline de Pauw	(Indonesia) Nova Widianto (Indonesia) Eny Widiowati	15–4, 15–7	(gold) Winner
