= Indra Wijaya =

Indonesian badminton player

Personal information
- Born: 16 March 1974 (age 52) Cirebon, West Java, Indonesia
- Height: 1.80 m (5 ft 11 in)

Sport
- Country: Indonesia (1974–2001); Singapore (2001–2013)
- Sport: Badminton
- Handedness: Right

Men's singles
- Highest ranking: 4
- BWF profile
Medal record
Men's badminton
Representing Indonesia
World Cup
Bronze medal – third place	1997 Yogyakarta	Men's singles
Thomas Cup
Gold medal – first place	1998 Hong Kong	Men's team
Asia Cup
Gold medal – first place	1997 Jakarta	Men's team
SEA Games
Gold medal – first place	1997 Jakarta	Men's team
Representing Singapore
Asian Championships
Bronze medal – third place	2001 Manila	Men's singles

Indra Wijaya (Chinese: 陳甲寅; pinyin: Chén Jiǎyín; born 16 March 1974) is a badminton player who initially represented Indonesia and subsequently Singapore. After his retirement, he started a new career as a coach.

== Career ==
Indra Wijaya is the eldest of four siblings: Candra, Rendra and Sandrawati, all of whom are badminton players. He was part of the early cohort of players under the centralized national training system in Cipayung during its inception in 1992. He also played for the Thomas Cup winning team in 1998. Wijaya resigned from the Indonesian national team in 2000 to move to Singapore, citing intense competition in the men's singles department with teammates such as Hendrawan and Hariyanto Arbi. He became the first player under the Singaporean flag to obtain an Asian Championships medal with his bronze medal in 2001, before Loh Kean Yew set an improved record with a silver medal in the 2023 edition.

After his retirement in 2004, Wijaya started a new career as a coach at the Candra Wijaya International Badminton Centre. In 2013, he began his international coaching career under the South Korean national badminton team, where he contributed to the rise of former world no. 1 Son Wan-ho. Later in 2016, he was recruited by the Badminton Association of Malaysia (BAM) to coach their junior men's singles squad. He was then promoted into head coach of Malaysia's women's singles department in June 2020.

In January 2022, Wijaya departed from the BAM to join his former protege Lee Zii Jia's new management, following Lee's decision to become an independent player. Under Wijaya's guidance, Lee won back-to-back titles at the 2022 Asian Championship and the Thailand Open, which propelled him into his highest world rank of no. 2.

Wijaya parted ways with Lee and his team in November 2022 after Lee expressed that he "wants to do something different" by forgoing a coach. However, controversy arose over the circumstances of Wijaya's contract termination. According to Wijaya's legal counsel Yazid & Co, his dismissal was based on Lee's personal decision, not his performance as a coach, and thus did not constitute as mutual termination. On the other hand, Lee's team claimed that Wijaya leaving their team's Whatsapp group and inquiring if he could take up other opportunities meant that he had also intended to end his contract. Wijaya filed a claim against Lee's management, LZJ Management Sdn Bhd, on the grounds of illegal termination of his three-year contract. In February 2024, Wijaya and LZJ Management reached an out-of-court settlement of their dispute.

On March 1, 2023, Wijaya was announced as Indonesia's new women's singles head coach. He supported Gregoria Mariska Tunjung's Olympic campaign in 2024, where she won bronze, as well as built Putri Kusuma Wardani's confidence after strings of inconsistency. In April 2025, he was appointed to replace Mulyo Handoyo as head coach of the men's singles first team, due to Handoyo's health problems. Wijaya contributed to creating an all-Indonesian men's singles final at the 2025 SEA Games individual event, which featured Alwi Farhan and M. Zaki Ubaidillah.

== Achievements ==
=== World Cup ===
Men's singles
Year	Venue	Opponent	Score	Result	Ref.
1997	Among Rogo Sports Hall; Yogyakarta, Indonesia	(Indonesia) Joko Suprianto	13–15, 10–15	Bronze	

=== Asian Championships ===
Men's singles
Year	Venue	Opponent	Score	Result	Ref.
2001	PhilSports Arena; Manila, Philippines	(China) Xia Xuanze	7–15, 8–15	Bronze	

=== World Junior Championships ===
The Bimantara World Junior Championships was an international invitation badminton tournament for junior players. It was held in Jakarta, Indonesia from 1987 to 1991.

Boys' singles
Year	Venue	Opponent	Score	Result	Ref.
1991	Istora Senayan; Jakarta, Indonesia	(Indonesia) Dwi Aryanto	15–7, 15–5	Gold	

=== IBF World Grand Prix (2 runners-up) ===
The World Badminton Grand Prix was sanctioned by the International Badminton Federation from 1983 to 2006.

Men's singles
Year	Tournament	Opponent	Score	Result	Ref.
1996	Malaysia Open	(Malaysia) Ong Ewe Hock	15–1, 1–15, 7–15	(silver) Runner-up	
1997	Singapore Open	(Indonesia) Hariyanto Arbi	15–3, 14–18, 9–15	(silver) Runner-up	

=== IBF International (1 title, 1 runner-up) ===
Men's singles
Year	Tournament	Opponent	Score	Result	Ref.
1994	Polish Open	(Indonesia) C. Arief	15–8, 15–12	(gold) Winner	
2002	Singapore Satellite	(Singapore) Ronald Susilo	10–15, 10–15	(silver) Runner-up	
