= Budi Santoso =

Indonesian badminton player

Personal information
- Born: 8 June 1975 (age 51) Klaten, Central Java, Indonesia

Sport
- Country: Indonesia
- Sport: Badminton
- Handedness: Right
- Event: Men's singles

Men's singles
- BWF profile
Medal record
Men's badminton
Representing Indonesia
Thomas Cup
Gold medal – first place	2002 Guangzhou	Men's team
Asian Games
Gold medal – first place	1998 Bangkok	Men's team
Asia Cup
Gold medal – first place	1997 Jakarta	Men's team

Budi Santoso (born 8 June 1975) is an Indonesian retired badminton player from PB Djarum club, who joined the club since 1982. He was part of the national team that clinched the men's team title at the Asian Games in 1998, and at the Thomas Cup in 2002. Santoso had been ranked in the world top ten. After retired from the international tournament, he started his career as a coach in Mutiara Bandung club, and later for the men's singles team in the national camp.

== Achievements ==
=== IBF World Grand Prix (2 titles, 6 runners-up) ===
The World Badminton Grand Prix sanctioned by International Badminton Federation (IBF) since 1983.

Men's singles
Year	Tournament	Opponent	Score	Result	Ref.
1995	Polish Open	(Indonesia) Jeffer Rosobin	11–15, 15–8, 15–11	(gold) Winner	
1996	Indonesia Open	(Indonesia) Joko Suprianto	8–15, 4–15	(silver) Runner-up	
1997	Swedish Open	(Indonesia) Ardy Wiranata	10–15, 10–15	(silver) Runner-up	
1998	Indonesia Open	(Malaysia) Yong Hock Kin	7–15, 6–15	(silver) Runner-up	
1998	Hong Kong Open	(China) Chen Gang	15–10, 15–10	(gold) Winner	
1999	Indonesia Open	(Indonesia) Taufik Hidayat	14–17, 12–15	(silver) Runner-up	
2000	Thailand Open	(Indonesia) Hendrawan	8–15, 10–15	(silver) Runner-up	
2002	All England Open	(China) Chen Hong	4–7, 5–7, 1–7	(silver) Runner-up	

IBF Grand Prix tournament
IBF Grand Prix Finals tournament

=== IBF International (1 runner-up) ===
Men's singles
Year	Tournament	Opponent	Score	Result	Ref.
2005	Jakarta Satellite	(Indonesia) Jeffer Rosobin	13–15, 12–15	(silver) Runner-up	

=== IBF Junior International (1 title, 1 runner-up) ===
Boys' singles
Year	Tournament	Opponent	Score	Result	Ref.
1993	Dutch Junior	(Indonesia) Michael Tedjakusuma	14–17, 9–15	(silver) Runner-up	
1993	German Junior	(Indonesia) Tedjosantoso		(gold) Winner	
