= Badminton at the 2002 Asian Games – Men's team =

Men's team at the 2002 Asian Games
- Venue: Gangseo Gymnasium
- Dates: 6–9 October
- Competitors: 57 from 7 nations

Medalists
gold medal	South Korea; Ha Tae-kwon, Jang Young-soo, Kim Dong-moon, Lee Dong-soo, Lee Hyun-il, Lee Jae-jin, Park Tae-sang, Shon Seung-mo, Yim Bang-eun, Yoo Yong-sung
silver medal	Indonesia; Rony Agustinus, Sigit Budiarto, Halim Haryanto, Hendrawan, Taufik Hidayat, Tri Kusharjanto, Marleve Mainaky, Bambang Suprianto, Nova Widianto, Candra Wijaya
bronze medal	China; Bao Chunlai, Chen Hong, Chen Qiqiu, Lin Dan, Liu Yong, Wang Wei, Xia Xuanze, Zhang Jun, Zhang Wei
bronze medal	Malaysia; Mohd Zakry Abdul Latif, Chan Chong Ming, Chang Kim Wai, Chew Choon Eng, Choong Tan Fook, James Chua, Mohd Hafiz Hashim, Lee Tsuen Seng, Ong Ewe Hock, Wong Choong Hann

The badminton men's team tournament at the 2002 Asian Games in Busan took place from 6 November to 8 November at Gangseo Gymnasium.

== Schedule ==
All times are Korea Standard Time (UTC+09:00)

Date	Time	Event
Sunday, 6 October 2002	17:30	Quarterfinals
Monday, 7 October 2002	17:30	Semifinals
Wednesday, 9 October 2002	16:00	Final

== Results ==
Quarterfinals
Thailand	1
Indonesia	3
Japan	0
South Korea	3
Hong Kong	0
2	Malaysia	3

Semifinals
1	China	1
Indonesia	3
South Korea	3
2	Malaysia	0

Final
Indonesia	1
South Korea	3

=== Quarterfinals ===
6 October	Thailand	1–3	Indonesia

Boonsak Ponsana	1–2	Taufik Hidayat	15–11, 13–15, 11–15
Anuphap Theeraratsakul	2–1	Rony Agustinus	15–11, 10–15, 15–14
Pramote Teerawiwatana / Tesana Panvisvas	1–2	Candra Wijaya / Sigit Budiarto	6–15, 15–6, 10–15
Khunakorn Sudhisodhi / Patapol Ngernsrisuk	0–2	Halim Haryanto / Tri Kusharjanto	13–15, 9–15

6 October	Japan	0–3	South Korea

Keita Masuda	0–2	Shon Seung-mo	11–15, 5–15
Hidetaka Yamada	0–2	Lee Hyun-il	11–15, 7–15
Hosemari Fujimoto / Sho Sasaki	0–2	Ha Tae-kwon / Lee Jae-jin	11–15, 2–15

6 October	Hong Kong	0–3	Malaysia

Ng Wei	1–2	Wong Choong Hann	2–15, 17–14, 8–15
Tam Lok Tin	0–2	Lee Tsuen Seng	6–15, 4–15
Liu Kwok Wa / Yau Tsz Yuk	0–2	Chan Chong Ming / Chew Choon Eng	3–15, 5–15

=== Semifinals ===
7 October	China	1–3	Indonesia

Lin Dan	0–2	Taufik Hidayat	12–15, 14–17
Xia Xuanze	2–1	Rony Agustinus	13–15, 15–9, 15–8
Liu Yong / Zhang Jun	1–2	Sigit Budiarto / Candra Wijaya	8–15, 15–13, 7–15
Zhang Wei / Chen Qiqiu	0–2	Halim Haryanto / Tri Kusharjanto	9–15, 9–15

7 October	South Korea	3–0	Malaysia

Shon Seung-mo	2–1	Wong Choong Hann	4–15, 15–6, 15–7
Lee Hyun-il	2–0	Lee Tsuen Seng	15–5, 15–2
Lee Dong-soo / Yoo Yong-sung	2–1	Chan Chong Ming / Chew Choon Eng	12–15, 15–9, 15–3

=== Final ===
8 October	Indonesia	1–3	South Korea

Taufik Hidayat	1–2	Shon Seung-mo	13–15, 15–13, 16–17
Rony Agustinus	0–2	Lee Hyun-il	3–15, 5–15
Sigit Budiarto / Candra Wijaya	2–0	Lee Dong-soo / Yoo Yong-sung	15–12, 15–10
Halim Haryanto / Tri Kusharjanto	0–2	Kim Dong-moon / Ha Tae-kwon	3–15, 6–15

== Non-participating athletes ==
- Bao Chunlai (CHN)
- Chen Hong (CHN)
- Wang Wei (CHN)
- Wong Tsz Yin (HKG)
- Hendrawan (INA)
- Marleve Mainaky (INA)
- Bambang Suprianto (INA)
- Nova Widianto (INA)
- Tadashi Otsuka (JPN)
- Jang Young-soo (KOR)
- Park Tae-sang (KOR)
- Yim Bang-eun (KOR)
- Mohd Zakry Abdul Latif (MAS)
- Chang Kim Wai (MAS)
- Choong Tan Fook (MAS)
- Mohd Hafiz Hashim (MAS)
- Ong Ewe Hock (MAS)
- James Chua (MAS)
- Sudket Prapakamol (THA)
- Jakrapan Thanathiratham (THA)
