= Chang Jeng-shyuang =

Taiwanese badminton player (born 1974)

Chang Jeng-shyuang 張政雄
Personal information
- Born: 30 January 1974 (age 52) Taiwan
- Height: 1.83 m (6 ft 0 in)
- Weight: 83 kg (183 lb)

Sport
- Country: Republic of China (Taiwan)
- Sport: Badminton
- Event: Men's singles
Medal record
Men's badminton
Representing Chinese Taipei
Asian Championships
Bronze medal – third place	1993 Hong Kong	Men's team
Asia Cup
Bronze medal – third place	1997 Jakarta	Men's team

Chang Jeng-shyuang (Chinese: 張政雄; pinyin: Zhāng Zhèngxióng; born 30 January 1974) is a Taiwanese badminton player. He competed in the men's singles tournament at the 1996 Summer Olympics.
