= 1997 Asian Junior Badminton Championships =

Tournament details
- Dates: 7–13 April 1997
- Venue: Ninoy Aquino Stadium
- Location: Manila, Philippines

The 1997 Asian Junior Badminton Championships is an Asia continental junior championships to crown the best U-19 badminton players across Asia. This tournament was held in Ninoy Aquino Stadium, Manila, Philippines from 7 to 13 April 1997.

The hosting rights was awarded to the Philippines in November 1996.

== Medalists ==
In the team event, China clinched the boys' and girs' team event after beat Indonesia in the final with the score 3–2 and 5–0 respectively. The boys' team bronze goes to Malaysia and South Korea, while the girls' team bronze goes to Japan and South Korea.

Event	Gold	Silver	Bronze
Boys' teams	China; Cai Yun; Chen Hong; Cheng Rui; Jiang Shan; Xia Xuanze; Zhang Yi; Zhang Tian	Indonesia; Chandra; Luluk Hadiyanto; Hartawan; Taufik Hidayat; Mohamed Noor Misuari; Arif Rasidi; Ignatius Rudy; Denny Setiawan	Malaysia; Chan Chong Ming; James Chua; Jeremy Gan; Lee Tsuen Seng; Tang Soo Sen; Yap Wee Meng; Yeoh Kay Bin
Boys' teams	China; Cai Yun; Chen Hong; Cheng Rui; Jiang Shan; Xia Xuanze; Zhang Yi; Zhang Tian	Indonesia; Chandra; Luluk Hadiyanto; Hartawan; Taufik Hidayat; Mohamed Noor Misuari; Arif Rasidi; Ignatius Rudy; Denny Setiawan	South Korea; Cheon Dong-cheol; Chun Se-do; Heo Hyeong-seon; Kwon Woo-jin; Hyeon Jun-hee; Chu Gyu-geun
Girls' teams	China; Gao Ling; Gong Ruina; Pi Hongyan; Yang Wei; Yu Hua; Zhou Mi	Indonesia; Yeni Andriani; Melisa Dewi Tjahjono; Vita Marissa; Rossi Riani; Atu Rosalina; Hanny Setiani; Eny Widowati	Japan; Mika Anjo; Kaori Mori
Girls' teams	China; Gao Ling; Gong Ruina; Pi Hongyan; Yang Wei; Yu Hua; Zhou Mi	Indonesia; Yeni Andriani; Melisa Dewi Tjahjono; Vita Marissa; Rossi Riani; Atu Rosalina; Hanny Setiani; Eny Widowati	South Korea; Choi Young-ah; Hwang Soon-jong; Lee Mi-suk; Lee Kyung-won; Lee Ji-sun; Park So-yun
Boys' singles	(Indonesia) Taufik Hidayat	(China) Chen Hong	(Indonesia) Ignatius Rudy
Boys' singles	(Indonesia) Taufik Hidayat	(China) Chen Hong	(China) Xia Xuanze
Girls' singles	(China) Gong Ruina	(China) Zhou Mi	(China) Pi Hongyan
Girls' singles	(China) Gong Ruina	(China) Zhou Mi	(Chinese Taipei) Huang Chia-chi
Boys' doubles	(Malaysia) Chan Chong Ming (Malaysia) Jeremy Gan	(China) Cai Yun (China) Zhang Yi	(China) Chen Hong (China) Xia Xuanze
Boys' doubles	(Malaysia) Chan Chong Ming (Malaysia) Jeremy Gan	(China) Cai Yun (China) Zhang Yi	(Indonesia) Luluk Hadiyanto (Indonesia) Mohamed Noor Misuari
Girls' doubles	(China) Gao Ling (China) Yang Wei	(Malaysia) Chor Hooi Yee (Malaysia) Lim Pek Siah	(Indonesia) Vita Marissa (Indonesia) Eny Widowati
Girls' doubles	(China) Gao Ling (China) Yang Wei	(Malaysia) Chor Hooi Yee (Malaysia) Lim Pek Siah	(China) Yu Hua (China) Zhou Mi
Mixed doubles	(China) Cheng Rui (China) Gao Ling	(Malaysia) Chan Chong Ming (Malaysia) Lim Pek Siah	(Indonesia) Denny Setiawan (Indonesia) Rossi Riani
Mixed doubles	(China) Cheng Rui (China) Gao Ling	(Malaysia) Chan Chong Ming (Malaysia) Lim Pek Siah	(China) Jiang Shan (China) Gong Ruina

== Results ==
=== Semifinals results ===
The table below were the semi-finals results.

Category	Winner	Runner-up	Score
Boys' singles	(China) Chen Hong	(Indonesia) Rudy Ignatius	9–15, 15–12, 15–11
Boys' singles	(Indonesia) Taufik Hidayat	(China) Xia Xuanze	2–15, 17–16, 15–4
Girls' singles	(China) Zhou Mi	(Chinese Taipei) Huang Chia-chi	10–12, 11–6, 11–9
Girls' singles	(China) Gong Ruina	(China) Pi Hongyan	11–6, 4–11, 12–10
Boys' doubles	(Malaysia) Chan Chong Ming (Malaysia) Jeremy Gan	(Indonesia) Luluk Hadiyanto (Indonesia) Mohamed Noor Misuari	15–11, 15–6
Boys' doubles	(China) Cai Yun (China) Zhang Yi	(China) Chen Hong (China) Xia Xuanze	15–6, 15–6
Girls' doubles	(Malaysia) Chor Hooi Yee (Malaysia) Lim Pek Siah	(China) Yu Hua (China) Zhou Mi	15–10, 15–6
Girls' doubles	(China) Gao Ling (China) Yang Wei	(Indonesia) Eny Widiowati (Indonesia) Vita Marissa	15–10, 15–12
Mixed doubles	(Malaysia) Chan Chong Ming (Malaysia) Lim Pek Siah	(Indonesia) Denny Setiawan (Indonesia) Rossi Riani	15–11, 15–2
Mixed doubles	(China) Cheng Rui (China) Gao Ling	(China) Jiang Shan (China) Gong Ruina	15–6, 15–5

=== Finals ===
Category	Winners	Runners-up	Score
Boys' singles	(Indonesia) Taufik Hidayat	(China) Chen Hong	15–11, 15–2
Girls' singles	(China) Gong Ruina	(China) Zhou Mi	11–5, 11–5
Boys' doubles	(Malaysia) Chan Chong Ming (Malaysia) Jeremy Gan	(China) Cai Yun (China) Zhang Yi	15–6, 15–3
Girls' doubles	(China) Gao Ling (China) Yang Wei	(Malaysia) Chor Hooi Yee (Malaysia) Lim Pek Siah	15–10, 15–8
Mixed doubles	(China) Cheng Rui (China) Gao Ling	(Malaysia) Chan Chong Ming (Malaysia) Lim Pek Siah	15–7, 15–9

== Medal table ==
Rank	Nation	Gold	Silver	Bronze	Total
1	China (CHN)	5	3	5	13
2	Indonesia (INA)	1	2	4	7
3	Malaysia (MAS)	1	2	1	4
4	South Korea (KOR)	0	0	2	2
5	Chinese Taipei (TPE)	0	0	1	1
5	Japan (JPN)	0	0	1	1
Totals (6 entries)		7	7	14	28
