= Wang Wei (badminton) =

Chinese badminton player (born 1979)

Wang Wei 王伟
Personal information
- Born: 15 September 1979 (age 47) Shanghai, China
- Height: 1.74 m (5 ft 9 in)

Sport
- Country: China
- Sport: Badminton
- Handedness: Left
- Event: Men's & mixed doubles

Men's & mixed doubles
- BWF profile
Medal record
Men's badminton
Representing China
Thomas Cup
Bronze medal – third place	2002 Guangzhou	Men's team
Asian Games
Bronze medal – third place	2002 Busan	Men's team
Asian Championships
Bronze medal – third place	2002 Bangkok	Mixed doubles
Bronze medal – third place	2001 Manila	Men's doubles
World Junior Championships
Gold medal – first place	1996 Silkeborg	Mixed doubles

Wang Wei (Chinese: 王伟; born 15 September 1979) was a former Chinese badminton player from Shanghai. In the junior event, he participated at the 1996 World Junior Championships and clinched a gold medal in the mixed doubles event with Lu Ying.

In 2001, he represented Shanghai at the National Games, and won a gold medal in the men's doubles event with Zhang Wei. He also won a bronze medal at the Asian Championships in the men's doubles event with Cheng Rui.

Wang was part of the national men's team that won a bronze medal at the 2002 Asian Games in Busan, South Korea and at the Thomas Cup in Guangzhou. Partnering with Zhao Tingting, he won a bronze medal at the Asian Championships in the mixed doubles event. His best achievement in the World Grand Prix tournament was a runner-up at the 2002 Malaysia Open in the mixed doubles event with Zhang Yawen.

In 2003, he was a mixed doubles runner-up at the National Championships tournament with his partner Zhang Jiewen. He competed at the World Championships with Cheng Rui in the men's doubles event, but finished in the quarter finals defeated by the Indonesian pair Sigit Budiarto and Candra Wijaya in straight games.

In 2004, he won a silver medal at the World University Championships.

He once served as a coach in Linyi Normal University, and as a Chinese national second team head coach.

== Achievements ==
=== Asian Championships ===
Men's doubles
Year	Venue	Partner	Opponent	Score	Result
2001	PhilSports Arena; Manila, Philippines	(China) Cheng Rui	(Indonesia) Tony Gunawan (Indonesia) Candra Wijaya	4–15, 14–17	Bronze

Mixed doubles
Year	Venue	Partner	Opponent	Score	Result
2002	Bangkok, Thailand	(China) Zhao Tingting	(China) Zhang Jun (China) Gao Ling	4–11, 3–11	Bronze

=== World Junior Championships ===
Mixed doubles
Year	Venue	Partner	Opponent	Score	Result
1996	Silkeborg Hallerne; Silkeborg, Denmark	(China) Lu Ying	(China) Cheng Rui (China) Gao Ling	15–4, 15–10	Gold

=== IBF World Grand Prix ===
The World Badminton Grand Prix sanctioned by International Badminton Federation (IBF) since 1983.

Women's doubles
Year	Tournament	Partner	Opponent	Score	Result
2002	Malaysia Open	(China) Zhang Yawen	(England) Nathan Robertson (England) Gail Emms	9–11, 4–11	(silver) Runner-up

=== IBF International ===
Men's doubles
Year	Tournament	Partner	Opponent	Score	Result
2006	Mongolian Satellite	(China) Zhang Lei	(South Korea) Han Sang-hoon (South Korea) Lee Yong-dae	3–15, 12–15	(silver) Runner-up
2002	French International	(China) Cheng Rui	(China) Sang Yang (China) Zheng Bo	8–7, 7–1, 7–3	(gold) Winner

Mixed doubles
Year	Tournament	Partner	Opponent	Score	Result
2005	Mongolian Satellite	(China) Tao Xiaolan	(South Korea) Lee Yong-dae (South Korea) Ha Jung-eun	7–15, 11–15	(silver) Runner-up
