= 1996 IBF World Junior Championships =

Tournament details
- Dates: 19 November 1996– 24 November 1996
- Edition: 3rd
- Venue: Silkeborg Hallerne
- Location: Silkeborg, Denmark

The 1996 IBF World Junior Championships was an international badminton tournament held in Silkeborg, Denmark from 19-24 November 1996.

== Individual competition ==
=== Medalists ===
Event	Gold	Silver	Bronze
Boys singles	(China) Zhu Feng	(Indonesia) Rudy Ignatius	(Indonesia) Rony Agustinus
Boys singles	(China) Zhu Feng	(Indonesia) Rudy Ignatius	(China) Xia Xuanze
Girls singles	(China) Yu Hua	(India) Aparna Popat	(Chinese Taipei) Peng Ju-yu
Girls singles	(China) Yu Hua	(India) Aparna Popat	(South Korea) Lee Kyung Won
Boys doubles	(Malaysia) Jeremy Gan and Chan Chong Ming	(Chinese Taipei) Huang Shih-chung and Chien Yu-hsun	(Indonesia) Hadi Saputra and Endra Mulyajaya
Boys doubles	(Malaysia) Jeremy Gan and Chan Chong Ming	(Chinese Taipei) Huang Shih-chung and Chien Yu-hsun	(South Korea) Kim Yong-hyun and Yim Bang-eun
Girls doubles	(China) Gao Ling and Yang Wei	(China) Lu Ying and Zhan Xubin	(South Korea) Chung Jae Hee and Yim Kyung Jin
Girls doubles	(China) Gao Ling and Yang Wei	(China) Lu Ying and Zhan Xubin	(Denmark) Jane Jacoby and Britta Andersen
Mixed doubles	(China) Wang Wei and Lu Ying	(China) Cheng Rui and Gao Ling	(Indonesia) Rizal Fadillah and Neneng Setiawati
Mixed doubles	(China) Wang Wei and Lu Ying	(China) Cheng Rui and Gao Ling	(China) Zhu Feng and Zhou Mi

== Results ==
=== Boys' singles ===
Semi-finals
(China) Zhu Feng	15	15
(Indonesia) Rony Agustinus	11	7
(Indonesia) Rudy Ignatius	17	17
(China) Xia Xuanze	16	14

Final
(China) Zhu Feng	16	15	15
(Indonesia) Rudy Ignatius	17	4	6

=== Girls' singles ===
Semi-finals
(South Korea) Lee Kyung-won	11	5	3
(India) Aparna Popat	4	11	11
(Chinese Taipei) Peng Ju-yu	4	11	3
(China) Yu Hua	11	6	11

Final
(India) Aparna Popat	7	3
(China) Yu Hua	11	11

=== Boys' doubles ===
Semi-finals
(Indonesia) Endra Mulyajaya (Indonesia) Hadi Saputra	14	8
(Malaysia) Jeremy Gan (Malaysia) Chan Chong Ming	18	15
(Chinese Taipei) Chien Yu-hsun (Chinese Taipei) Huang Shih-chung	15	15
(South Korea) Kim Yong-hyun (South Korea) Yim Bang-eun	11	7

Final
(Malaysia) Jeremy Gan (Malaysia) Chan Chong Ming	18	15
(Chinese Taipei) Chien Yu-hsun (Chinese Taipei) Huang Shih-chung	17	7

=== Girls' doubles ===
Semi-finals
(Denmark) Britta Andersen (Denmark) Jane Jacoby	7	12
(China) Lu Ying (China) Zhan Xubin	15	15
(South Korea) Chung Jae-hee (South Korea) Yim Kyung-jin	15	10	11
(China) Gao Ling (China) Yang Wei	12	15	15

Final
(China) Lu Ying (China) Zhan Xubin	12	8
(China) Gao Ling (China) Yang Wei	15	15

=== Mixed doubles ===
Semi-finals
(China) Cheng Rui (China) Gao Ling	15	17
(China) Zhu Feng (China) Zhou Mi	8	14
(Indonesia) Rizal Fadillah (Indonesia) Neneng Setiawati	5	11
(China) Wang Wei (China) Lu Ying	15	15

Final
(China) Cheng Rui (China) Gao Ling	4	10
(China) Wang Wei (China) Lu Ying	15	15

== Medal account ==
Pos	Country	Gold	Silver	Bronze	Total
1	China	4	2	2	8
2	Malaysia	1	0	0	1
3	Indonesia	0	1	3	4
4	Chinese Taipei	0	1	1	2
5	India	0	1	0	1
6	South Korea	0	0	3	3
7	Denmark	0	0	1	1
