= Luluk Hadiyanto =

Indonesian badminton player

Personal information
- Born: 8 June 1980 (age 46) Blora, Central Java, Indonesia
- Height: 1.71 m (5 ft 7 in)

Sport
- Country: Indonesia
- Sport: Badminton
- Handedness: Right
- Coached by: Christian Hadinata

Men's doubles
- Highest ranking: 1 (MD with Alvent Yulianto) (30 December 2004)
- BWF profile
Medal record
Men's badminton
Representing Indonesia
World Championships
| Bronze medal – third place | 2005 Anaheim | Men's doubles |
Sudirman Cup
| Silver medal – second place | 2007 Glasgow | Mixed team |
| Silver medal – second place | 2005 Beijing | Mixed team |
Thomas Cup
| Bronze medal – third place | 2006 Sendai & Tokyo | Men's team |
| Bronze medal – third place | 2004 Jakarta | Men's team |
Asian Games
| Silver medal – second place | 2006 Doha | Men's doubles |
| Bronze medal – third place | 2006 Doha | Men's team |
Asian Championships
| Bronze medal – third place | 2000 Jakarta | Men's doubles |
| Bronze medal – third place | 2003 Jakarta | Men's doubles |
| Bronze medal – third place | 2006 Johor Bahru | Men's doubles |
SEA Games
| Gold medal – first place | 2003 Vietnam | Men's team |
| Silver medal – second place | 2005 Manila | Men's doubles |
| Silver medal – second place | 2005 Manila | Men's team |
| Bronze medal – third place | 2003 Vietnam | Men's doubles |
Asian Junior Championships
| Silver medal – second place | 1997 Manila | Boys' team |
| Bronze medal – third place | 1997 Manila | Boys' doubles |

Luluk Hadiyanto (born 8 June 1980) is a badminton player from Indonesia, specialized in men's doubles and former world number one with doubles partner Alvent Yulianto.

== Career ==
His first big international success came in 2001 winning the Thailand Open with Sigit Budiarto. In partnership with fellow countryman Alvent Yulianto, Hadiyanto won four top tier international men's doubles titles in 2004; the Thailand, Korea, Singapore, and Indonesia Opens. They achieved a number one world ranking that year despite a disappointing 2004 Olympics which saw them eliminated in the round of 16. Since 2004 Hadiyanto and Yulianto have struggled to achieve top form. Second place finishes in the quadrennial Asian Games (2006); and the Japan (2007) and Korea (2008) Opens (now called Super Series events) have been their highest finishes in major international tournaments, though they won the Indonesian national title in 2007. In 2006 they also won a bronze medal at the Asian Badminton Championships in Johor Bahru, Malaysia.

After a disappointing 21–19, 14–21, 14–21, first round loss against the Japanese Keita Masuda & Tadashi Ohtsuka at the 2008 Olympics with Alvent Yulianto, the couple split partnership and Luluk left the National team of Indonesia. From 2009 Luluk Hadiyanto as an independent then first partnered Candra Wijaya and then more frequently Joko Riyadi. Still in men's doubles Luluk Hadiyanto won his last big event, the 2009 Vietnam Open with new partner Joko Riyadi, seeded 7th beating 1st seeded Malaysian doubles pair Choong Tan Fook & Lee Wan Wah 21–17, 22–20 in the semi-finals and then another Malaysian couple Hoon Thien How & Ong Soon Hock in the final of this BWF Grand Prix event in straight games 21–19, 22–20. In 2010 Luluk Hadiyanto again formed a doubles combination with Candra Wijaya. In the middle of 2011 Luluk changed partnership one last time prior to retirement, he coupled up with fellow Indonesian Imam Sodikin Irawan.

== Achievements ==
=== World Championships ===
Men's doubles
| Year | Venue | Partner | Opponent | Score | Result | Ref. |
|---|---|---|---|---|---|---|
| 2005 | Arrowhead Pond, Anaheim, United States | (Indonesia) Alvent Yulianto | (United States) Tony Gunawan (United States) Howard Bach | 9–15, 13–15 | Bronze | |

=== Asian Games ===
Men's doubles
| Year | Venue | Partner | Opponent | Score | Result | Ref. |
|---|---|---|---|---|---|---|
| 2006 | Aspire Hall 3, Doha, Qatar | (Indonesia) Alvent Yulianto | (Malaysia) Koo Kien Keat (Malaysia) Tan Boon Heong | 13–21, 14–21 | Silver | |

=== Asian Championships ===
Men's doubles
| Year | Venue | Partner | Opponent | Score | Result |
|---|---|---|---|---|---|
| 2000 | Tennis Indoor Gelora Bung Karno, Jakarta, Indonesia | (Indonesia) Imam Sodikin | (Indonesia) Tony Gunawan (Indonesia) Rexy Mainaky | 13–15, 1–15 | Bronze |
| 2003 | Istora Gelora Bung Karno, Jakarta, Indonesia | (Indonesia) Alvent Yulianto | (South Korea) Lee Dong-soo (South Korea) Yoo Yong-sung | 7–15, 4–15 | Bronze |
| 2006 | Bandaraya Stadium, Johor Bahru, Malaysia | (Indonesia) Alvent Yulianto | (Malaysia) Choong Tan Fook (Malaysia) Lee Wan Wah | 14–21, 21–18, 15–21 | Bronze |

=== SEA Games ===
Men's doubles
| Year | Venue | Partner | Opponent | Score | Result |
|---|---|---|---|---|---|
| 2003 | Tan Binh Sport Center, Ho Chi Minh City, Vietnam | (Indonesia) Alvent Yulianto | (Malaysia) Chew Choon Eng (Malaysia) Chang Kim Wai | 15–11, 13–15, 9–15 | Bronze |
| 2005 | PhilSports Arena, Pasig, Philippines | (Indonesia) Alvent Yulianto | (Indonesia) Markis Kido (Indonesia) Hendra Setiawan | 8–15, 15–7, 6–15 | Silver |

=== BWF Superseries (2 runners-up) ===
The BWF Superseries, which was launched on 14 December 2006 and implemented in 2007, is a series of elite badminton tournaments, sanctioned by the Badminton World Federation (BWF). BWF Superseries levels are Superseries and Superseries Premier. A season of Superseries consists of twelve tournaments around the world that have been introduced since 2011. Successful players are invited to the Superseries Finals, which are held at the end of each year.

Men's doubles
| Year | Tournament | Partner | Opponent | Score | Result |
|---|---|---|---|---|---|
| 2007 | Japan Open | (Indonesia) Alvent Yulianto | (United States) Tony Gunawan (Indonesia) Candra Wijaya | 18–21, 17–21 | (silver) Runner-up |
| 2008 | Korea Open | (Indonesia) Alvent Yulianto | (China) Cai Yun (China) Fu Haifeng | 7–21, 22–20, 17–21 | (silver) Runner-up |

=== BWF Grand Prix (6 titles, 2 runners-up) ===
The BWF Grand Prix had two levels, the Grand Prix and Grand Prix Gold. It was a series of badminton tournaments sanctioned by the Badminton World Federation (BWF) and played between 2007 and 2017. The World Badminton Grand Prix sanctioned by International Badminton Federation (IBF) from 1983 to 2006.

Men's doubles
| Year | Tournament | Partner | Opponent | Score | Result |
|---|---|---|---|---|---|
| 2001 | Thailand Open | (Indonesia) Sigit Budiarto | (Thailand) Pramote Teerawiwatana (Thailand) Tesana Panvisavas | 5–7, 7–5, 8–6 | (gold) Winner |
| 2004 | Thailand Open | (Indonesia) Alvent Yulianto | (England) Nathan Robertson (England) Anthony Clark | 15–12, 15–6 | (gold) Winner |
| 2004 | Swiss Open | (Indonesia) Alvent Yulianto | (China) Cai Yun (China) Fu Haifeng | 9–15, 14–17 | (silver) Runner-up |
| 2004 | Korea Open | (Indonesia) Alvent Yulianto | (China) Sang Yang (China) Zheng Bo | 15–12, 15–12 | (gold) Winner |
| 2004 | Malaysia Open | (Indonesia) Alvent Yulianto | (Malaysia) Lee Wan Wah (Malaysia) Choong Tan Fook | 12–15, 7–15 | (silver) Runner-up |
| 2004 | Singapore Open | (Indonesia) Alvent Yulianto | (Denmark) Martin Lundgaard Hansen (Denmark) Jens Eriksen | 15–2, 15–9 | (gold) Winner |
| 2004 | Indonesia Open | (Indonesia) Alvent Yulianto | (China) Cai Yun (China) Fu Haifeng | 15–8, 15–11 | (gold) Winner |
| 2009 | Vietnam Open | (Indonesia) Joko Riyadi | (Malaysia) Hoon Thien How (Malaysia) Ong Soon Hock | 21–19, 22–20 | (gold) Winner |

=== IBF International (1 runner-up) ===
Men's doubles
| Year | Tournament | Partner | Opponent | Score | Result |
|---|---|---|---|---|---|
| 2001 | Singapore International | (Indonesia) Endra Mulyajaya | (Indonesia) Ade Lukas (Indonesia) Andreas Setiawan | 15–9, 6–15, 12–15 | (silver) Runner-up |

== Post-playing career ==
After his active career Luluk Hadiyanto earned his Bachelor of Science degree in the Department of public administration at the University of Indonesia, and is now working for the Indonesian Ministry of Youth and Sport (Kemenpora) in the field of badminton specifically teaching in diklat SKO Ragunan (Ragunan Sports School). The players of Ragunan Sports School who joined National Team include Yeremia Rambitan, Ikhsan Leonardo I. Rumbay, Amri Syahnawi. He earned a master's degree in Sport Management at his post graduate study at the Jakarta State University.

== Personal life ==
Luluk Hadiyanto is married to Wardahnia and the couple have 2 son and 1 daughter, namely, Rajendra Bhima Hadiyanto, Alesha Wardhani Hadiyanto and Ranedra Mirza Hadiyanto.
