= Lee Dong-soo =

South Korean badminton player

Lee Dong-soo 이동수
Personal information
- Born: 7 June 1974 (age 52) Seoul, South Korea
- Height: 1.82 m (6 ft 0 in)
- Weight: 73 kg (161 lb)

Sport
- Country: South Korea
- Sport: Badminton
- Handedness: Right

Men's doubles
- Highest ranking: 1
- BWF profile
Medal record
Men's badminton
Representing South Korea
Olympic Games
Silver medal – second place	2004 Athens	Men's doubles
Silver medal – second place	2000 Sydney	Men's doubles
World Championships
Silver medal – second place	1999 Copenhagen	Men's doubles
Bronze medal – third place	1997 Glasgow	Men's Doubles
World Cup
Silver medal – second place	1997 Yogyakarta	Men's doubles
Sudirman Cup
Gold medal – first place	2003 Eindhoven	Mixed team
Silver medal – second place	1997 Glasgow	Mixed team
Bronze medal – third place	2001 Seville	Mixed team
Bronze medal – third place	1999 Copenhagen	Mixed team
Bronze medal – third place	1995 Lausanne	Mixed team
Thomas Cup
Bronze medal – third place	2004 Jakarta	Men's team
Bronze medal – third place	2000 Kuala Lumpur	Men's team
Bronze medal – third place	1996 Hong Kong	Men's team
Asian Games
Gold medal – first place	2002 Busan	Men's doubles
Gold medal – first place	2002 Busan	Men's team
Silver medal – second place	1998 Bangkok	Mixed doubles
Bronze medal – third place	1998 Bangkok	Men's doubles
Bronze medal – third place	1998 Bangkok	Men's team
Asian Championships
Gold medal – first place	2003 Jakarta	Men's doubles
Asia Cup
Silver medal – second place	2001 Singapore	Men's team
East Asian Games
Gold medal – first place	1997 Busan	Men's doubles
Gold medal – first place	1997 Busan	Mixed doubles
Gold medal – first place	1997 Busan	Men's team

- Lee Dong-soo
- Hangul: 이동수
- Hanja: 李東秀
- RR: I Dongsu
- MR: I Tongsu

Lee Dong-soo (Korean: 이동수; born 7 June 1974) is a South Korean former badminton player who affiliate with the Samsung Electro-Mechanics.

== Competition ==
Lee competed for Korea in badminton at the 2004 Summer Olympics in the men's doubles with partner Yoo Yong-sung. They defeated José Antonio Crespo and Sergio Llopis of Spain in the first round and Luluk Hadiyanto and Alvent Yulianto of Indonesia in the second. In the quarter-finals, Lee and Yoo beat Choong Tan Fook and Lee Wan Wah of Malaysia 11–15, 15–11, 15–9. They won the semi-final against Jens Eriksen and Martin Lundgaard Hansen of Denmark 9–15, 15–5, 15-3, but lost the final to fellow Koreans Ha Tae-kwon and Kim Dong-moon 11–15, 4–15 to finish with the silver medal.

== Achievements ==
=== Olympic Games ===
Men's doubles
Year	Venue	Partner	Opponent	Score	Result
2000	The Dome, Sydney, Australia	(South Korea) Yoo Yong-sung	(Indonesia) Tony Gunawan (Indonesia) Candra Wijaya	10–15, 15–9, 7–15	Silver
2004	Goudi Olympic Hall, Athens, Greece	(South Korea) Yoo Yong-sung	(South Korea) Ha Tae-kwon (South Korea) Kim Dong-moon	11–15, 4–15	Silver

=== World Championships ===
Men's doubles
Year	Venue	Partner	Opponent	Score	Result
1999	Brøndby Arena, Copenhagen, Denmark	(South Korea) Yoo Yong-sung	(South Korea) Ha Tae-kwon (South Korea) Kim Dong-moon	5–15, 5–15	Silver
1997	Scotstoun Centre, Glasgow, Scotland	(South Korea) Yoo Yong-sung	(Indonesia) Candra Wijaya (Indonesia) Sigit Budiarto	11–15, 11–15	Bronze

=== World Cup ===
Men's doubles
Year	Venue	Partner	Opponent	Score	Result
1997	Yogyakarta, Indonesia	(South Korea) Yoo Yong-sung	(Indonesia) Ricky Subagja (Indonesia) Rexy Mainaky	1–15, 15–10, 3–15	Silver

=== Asian Games ===
Men's doubles
Year	Venue	Partner	Opponent	Score	Result
2002	Gangseo Gymnasium; Busan, South Korea	(South Korea) Yoo Yong-sung	(Thailand) Pramote Teerawiwatana (Thailand) Tesana Panvisvas	15–11, 15–6	Gold
1998	Thammasat Gymnasium 2 Bangkok, Thailand	(South Korea) Yoo Yong-sung	(Thailand) Pramote Teerawiwatana (Thailand) Siripong Siripool	17–16, 6–15, 7–15	Bronze

Mixed doubles
Year	Venue	Partner	Opponent	Score	Result
1998	Thammasat Gymnasium 2 Bangkok, Thailand	(South Korea) Yim Kyung-jin	(South Korea) Kim Dong-moon (South Korea) Ra Kyung-min	6–15, 8–15	Silver

=== Asian Championships ===
Men's doubles
Year	Venue	Partner	Opponent	Score	Result
2003	Tennis Indoor Gelora Bung Karno; Jakarta, Indonesia	(South Korea) Yoo Yong-sung	(Indonesia) Markis Kido (Indonesia) Hendra Setiawan	15–10, 15–11	Gold

=== East Asian Games ===
Men's doubles
Year	Venue	Partner	Opponent	Score	Result
1997	Busan, South Korea	(South Korea) Yoo Yong-sung	(South Korea) Choi Ji-tae (South Korea) Kim Joong-suk	15–2, 15–4	Gold

Mixed doubles
Year	Venue	Partner	Opponent	Score	Result
1997	Busan, South Korea	(South Korea) Yim Kyung-jin	(China) Yang Ming (China) Zhang Jin	15–11, 15–7	Gold

=== IBF World Grand Prix ===
The World Badminton Grand Prix sanctioned by International Badminton Federation (IBF) since 1983.

Men's doubles
Year	Tournament	Partner	Opponent	Score	Result
2003	Hong Kong Open	(South Korea) Yoo Yong-sung	(Malaysia) Choong Tan Fook (Malaysia) Lee Wan Wah	15–13, 6–15, 15–6	(gold) Winner
2003	Malaysia Open	(South Korea) Kim Dong-moon	(China) Cai Yun (China) Fu Haifeng	17–15, 15–11	(gold) Winner
2003	Korea Open	(South Korea) Yoo Yong-sung	(South Korea) Ha Tae-kwon (South Korea) Kim Dong-moon	11–15, 6–15	(silver) Runner-up
2003	All England Open	(South Korea) Yoo Yong-sung	(Indonesia) Sigit Budiarto (Indonesia) Candra Wijaya	7–15, 5–15	(silver) Runner-up
2002	Indonesia Open	(South Korea) Yoo Yong-sung	(England) Flandy Limpele (England) Eng Hian	15–10, 15–11	(gold) Winner
2002	Korea Open	(South Korea) Yoo Yong-sung	(South Korea) Ha Tae-kwon (South Korea) Kim Dong-moon	0–7, 4–7, 0–7	(silver) Runner-up
2002	Swiss Open	(South Korea) Yoo Yong-sung	(Denmark) Jens Eriksen (Denmark) Martin Lundgaard Hansen	5–7, 7–5, 7–2, 7–5	(gold) Winner
2001	Hong Kong Open	(South Korea) Yoo Yong-sung	(Hong Kong) Albertus Susanto Njoto (Hong Kong) Yau Kwun Yuen	7–1, 7–2, 7–3	(gold) Winner
2001	Korea Open	(South Korea) Yoo Yong-sung	(South Korea) Ha Tae-kwon (South Korea) Kim Dong-moon	9–15, 4–15	(silver) Runner-up
2000	Malaysia Open	(South Korea) Yoo Yong-sung	(Indonesia) Flandy Limpele (Indonesia) Eng Hian	9–15, 9–15	(silver) Runner-up
2000	Japan Open	(South Korea) Yoo Yong-sung	(Indonesia) Tony Gunawan (Indonesia) Candra Wijaya	6–15, 7–15	(silver) Runner-up
2000	All England Open	(South Korea) Yoo Yong-sung	(South Korea) Ha Tae-kwon (South Korea) Kim Dong-moon	4–15, 15–13, 15–17	(silver) Runner-up
2000	Korea Open	(South Korea) Yoo Yong-sung	(Indonesia) Ricky Subagja (Indonesia) Rexy Mainaky	15–8, 9–15, 15–4	(gold) Winner
1999	China Open	(South Korea) Yoo Yong-sung	(South Korea) Ha Tae-kwon (South Korea) Kim Dong-moon	16–17, 8–15	(silver) Runner-up
1999	Japan Open	(South Korea) Yoo Yong-sung	(South Korea) Ha Tae-kwon (South Korea) Kim Dong-moon	6–15, 4–15	(silver) Runner-up
1999	All England Open	(South Korea) Yoo Yong-sung	(Indonesia) Tony Gunawan (Indonesia) Candra Wijaya	7–15, 5–15	(silver) Runner-up
1999	Swedish Open	(South Korea) Yoo Yong-sung	(South Korea) Ha Tae-kwon (South Korea) Kim Dong-moon	11–15, 5–15	(silver) Runner-up
1998	All England Open	(South Korea) Yoo Yong-sung	(Indonesia) Tony Gunawan (Indonesia) Candra Wijaya	15–10, 15–10	(gold) Winner
1997	Vietnam Open	(South Korea) Yoo Yong-sung	(Indonesia) Ricky Subagja (Indonesia) Rexy Mainaky	11–15, 5–15	(silver) Runner-up
1997	Thailand Open	(South Korea) Yoo Yong-sung	(Indonesia) Sigit Budiarto (Indonesia) Candra Wijaya	15–8, 17–14	(gold) Winner
1997	Singapore Open	(South Korea) Yoo Yong-sung	(Indonesia) Sigit Budiarto (Indonesia) Candra Wijaya	8–15, 10–15	(silver) Runner-up
1997	Indonesia Open	(South Korea) Yoo Yong-sung	(Indonesia) Sigit Budiarto (Indonesia) Candra Wijaya	9–15, 10–15	(silver) Runner-up
1997	Swiss Open	(South Korea) Yoo Yong-sung	(Indonesia) Sigit Budiarto (Indonesia) Candra Wijaya	5–15, 15–11, 15–4	(gold) Winner

Mixed doubles
Year	Tournament	Partner	Opponent	Score	Result
1997	Vietnam Open	(South Korea) Park Soo-yun	(Indonesia) Bambang Suprianto (Indonesia) Rosalina Riseu	5–15, 10–15	(silver) Runner-up
1997	Chinese Taipei Open	(South Korea) Park Soo-yun	(Indonesia) Sandiarto (Indonesia) Finarsih	11–15, 8–15	(silver) Runner-up

=== IBF International ===
Men's doubles
Year	Tournament	Partner	Opponent	Score	Result
1999	Australia International	(South Korea) Ha Tae-kwon	(South Korea) Kim Dong-moon (South Korea) Yoo Yong-sung	17–14, 9–15, 12–15	(silver) Runner-up
1991	Hungarian International	(South Korea) Kim Young-gil	(South Korea) Ha Tae-kwon (South Korea) Hwang Sun-ho	14–17, 15–12, 15–9	(gold) Winner
