= Huang Shih-chung =

Chinese badminton player (born 1979)

Huang Shih-chung 黃世忠
Personal information
- Born: 29 March 1979 (age 47)
- Height: 1.76 m (5 ft 9 in)

Sport
- Country: Republic of China (Taiwan)
- Sport: Badminton
- Handedness: Right
- Event: Men's & mixed doubles

Men's & mixed doubles
- BWF profile
Medal record
Men's badminton
Representing Chinese Taipei
Asia Cup
Bronze medal – third place	1997 Jakarta	Men's team
East Asian Games
Silver medal – second place	1997 Busan	Men's team
World Junior Championships
Silver medal – second place	1996 Silkeborg	Boys' doubles

Huang Shih-chung (Chinese: 黃世忠; pinyin: Huáng Shìzhōng; Wade–Giles: Huáng Shì-zhōng; born 29 March 1979) is a former badminton player from the Republic of China. He was the silver medalist at the 1996 World Junior Championships in the boys' doubles event partnered with Chien Yu-hsun. In the senior international tournament, he firstly took the podium as a men's doubles runner-up at the 1997 Spanish International. At the IBF Grand Prix tournament, he was the semifinalists at the 2002 U.S. Open and 2004 Thailand Open. He also participated at the World Championships in 1997, 1999, 2001, 2005 and in 2006. Huang occupied the men's doubles title at the 2006 Victorian International alongside Chien Yu-hsun. Educated at the National Taiwan Sport University, he won the men's doubles gold at the 1998, 2000, and 2006 World University Championships, also the mixed and men's doubles silver in 1998 and 2002 respectively. He was part of the national men's team that clinched the bronze medal at the 1997 East Asian Games and Asia Cup.

== Achievements ==
=== World Junior Championships ===
Boys' doubles
Year	Venue	Partner	Opponent	Score	Result
1996	Silkeborg Hallerne; Silkeborg, Denmark	(Chinese Taipei) Chien Yu-hsun	(Malaysia) Jeremy Gan (Malaysia) Chan Chong Ming	17–18, 7–15	Silver

=== IBF International ===
Men's doubles
Year	Tournament	Partner	Opponent	Score	Result
2006	Victorian International	(Chinese Taipei) Chien Yu-hsun	(Chinese Taipei) Lin Chia-hung (Chinese Taipei) Lin Wei-hsiang	21–15, 21–13	(gold) Winner
2004	Austrian International	(Chinese Taipei) Chien Yu-hsun	(Chinese Taipei) Lee Sung-yuan (Chinese Taipei) Lin Wei-hsiang	9–15, 9–15	(silver) Runner-up
1997	Spanish International	(Chinese Taipei) Chien Yu-hsiu	(Chinese Taipei) Lee Sung-yuan (Chinese Taipei) Lin Wei-hsiang	9–15, 13–15	(silver) Runner-up
