= Cheng Rui (badminton) =

Chinese badminton player

Cheng Rui 程瑞
Personal information
- Born: 31 July 1979 (age 47) Wuhan, China
- Height: 1.75 m (5 ft 9 in)
- Weight: 65 kg (143 lb)

Sport
- Country: China
- Sport: Badminton
- Handedness: Right
- Event: Men's & mixed doubles

Men's & mixed doubles
- BWF profile
Medal record
Men's badminton
Representing China
Thomas Cup
Bronze medal – third place	2002 Guangzhou	Men's team
Asian Championships
Bronze medal – third place	2001 Manila	Men's doubles
World Junior Championships
Silver medal – second place	1996 Silkeborg	Mixed doubles
Asian Junior Championships
Gold medal – first place	1997 Manila	Mixed doubles
Gold medal – first place	1997 Manila	Boys' team

Cheng Rui (Chinese: 程瑞, born 31 July 1979) is a former Chinese badminton player.

== Career ==
Cheng graduated from the Hubei Sports School, entered the Hubei team in 1992, and selected to join the national team in 1998. In 2001, he joined the Qingdao Double Star Badminton Club. He was the men's doubles champion at the 2002 French International partnered with Wang Wei, also the runner-up at the Swiss and Japan Open partnered with Chen Qiqiu.

== Achievements ==
=== Asian Championships ===
Men's doubles
Year	Venue	Partner	Opponent	Score	Result
2001	PhilSports Arena; Manila, Philippines	(China) Wang Wei	(Indonesia) Tony Gunawan (Indonesia) Candra Wijaya	4–15, 14–17	Bronze

=== World Junior Championships ===
Mixed doubles
Year	Venue	Partner	Opponent	Score	Result
1996	Silkeborg Hallerne; Silkeborg, Denmark	(China) Gao Ling	(China) Wang Wei (China) Lu Ling	4–15, 10–15	Silver

=== Asian Junior Championships ===
Mixed doubles
Year	Venue	Partner	Opponent	Score	Result
1997	Ninoy Aquino Stadium; Manila, Philippines	(China) Gao Ling	(Malaysia) Chan Chong Ming (Malaysia) Lim Pek Siah	15–7, 15–9	Gold

=== IBF World Grand Prix ===
The World Badminton Grand Prix sanctioned by International Badminton Federation (IBF) since 1983.

Men's doubles
Year	Tournament	Partner	Opponent	Score	Result
2003	Japan Open	(China) Chen Qiqiu	(England) Eng Hian (England) Flandy Limpele	5–15, 12–15	(silver) Runner-up
2003	Swiss Open	(China) Chen Qiqiu	(England) Eng Hian (England) Flandy Limpele	15–10, 5–15, 1–15	(silver) Runner-up

=== BWF International Challenge/Series ===
Men's doubles
Year	Tournament	Partner	Opponent	Score	Result
2002	French International	(China) Wang Wei	(China) Sang Yang (China) Zheng Bo	8–7, 7–1, 7–3	(gold) Winner
1995	Ten Days of Dawn	(China) Xia Xuanze	(Malaysia) Khoo Boo Hock (Malaysia) Lee Chee Leong	0–15, 0–15	(silver) Runner-up
