= Chien Yu-hsiu =

Chien Yu-hsiu 簡佑修
Personal information
- Born: 29 February 1980 (age 46) New Taipei City, Taiwan
- Height: 1.68 m (5 ft 6 in)
- Weight: 63 kg (139 lb)

Sport
- Country: Republic of China (Taiwan)
- Sport: Badminton
- Handedness: Right
- Event: Men's singles

Men's singles
- BWF profile
Medal record
Men's badminton
Representing Chinese Taipei
Asian Junior Championships
Gold medal – first place	1998 Kuala Lumpur	Boys' singles
Bronze medal – third place	1998 Kuala Lumpur	Boys' team

Chien Yu-hsiu (simplified Chinese: 简佑修; traditional Chinese: 簡佑修; pinyin: Jiǎn Yùxiù; Wade–Giles: Chien Yü-hsiu; born 29 February 1980) is a former badminton player from the Republic of China. Chien graduated from the National Taiwan Sport University and now works as junior coach in Hsinchu. He won the 1998 Asian Junior Championships in the boys' singles event. Chien won the senior international tournament at the 2003 U.S. Open. He competed at the 1998 Asian Games, and 2004 Summer Olympics.

His brother Chien Yu-hsun also a professional badminton player.

== Achievements ==
=== World Junior Championships ===
Boys' doubles
Year	Venue	Partner	Opponent	Score	Result
1996	Silkeborg Hallerne; Silkeborg, Denmark	(Chinese Taipei) Huang Shih-chung	(Malaysia) Jeremy Gan (Malaysia) Chan Chong Ming	17–18, 7–15	Silver

=== Asian Junior Championships ===
Boys' singles
Year	Venue	Opponent	Score	Result
1998	Kuala Lumpur Badminton Stadium; Kuala Lumpur, Malaysia	(Indonesia) Endra Feryanto	15–1, 15–1	(gold) Gold

=== IBF World Grand Prix ===
The World Badminton Grand Prix sanctioned by International Badminton Federation (IBF) since 1983.

Men's singles
Year	Tournament	Opponent	Score	Result
2003	U.S. Open	(South Korea) Ahn Hyun-suk	5–15, 15–6, 15–12	(gold) Winner

=== IBF International ===
Men's singles
Year	Tournament	Opponent	Score	Result
2004	Austrian International	(Poland) Przemyslaw Wacha	13–15, 15–11, 8–15	(silver) Runner-up
2004	Iran Fajr International	(Japan) Shoji Sato	11–15, 11–15	(silver) Runner-up

Men's doubles
Year	Tournament	Partner	Opponent	Score	Result
1997	Spanish International	(Chinese Taipei) Huang Shih-chung	(Chinese Taipei) Lee Sung-yuan (Chinese Taipei) Lin Wei-hsiang	9–15, 13–15	(silver) Runner-up
