= James Chua =

Malaysian badminton player

James Chua 蔡其豪
Personal information
- Born: 30 March 1979 (age 47) Kuching, Sarawak, Malaysia
- Height: 1.71 m (5 ft 7 in)
- Weight: 73 kg (161 lb)

Sport
- Country: Malaysia
- Sport: Badminton
- Handedness: Right
- Event: Men's singles

Men's singles
- BWF profile
Medal record
Men's badminton
Representing Malaysia
Asian Games
Bronze medal – third place	2002 Busan	Men's team
Bronze medal – third place	1998 Bangkok	Men's team
Asian Junior Championships
Bronze medal – third place	1997 Manila	Boys' team

James Chua (Chinese: 蔡其豪; born 30 March 1979) is a Malaysian former badminton player. Born in Sarawak, Chua moved to Kuala Lumpur to join the BAM squad in 1995. He was part of the Malaysia junior team that won the boys' team bronze at the 1997 Asian Junior Championships in Manila. He was the champion at the 1998 Malaysia Satellite, and in 2001 clinched the National Championships title. Chua won the World Grand Prix title at the 2002 Malaysia Open defeated his compatriot the defending champion, Ong Ewe Hock in straight games. Together with the national men's team, they won the bronze medals at the 1998 and 2002 Asian Games.

Chua is currently coaching at the Czech Republic badminton association since September 2024.

== Achievements ==
=== IBF World Grand Prix ===
The World Badminton Grand Prix sanctioned by International Badminton Federation (IBF) since 1983.

Men's singles
Year	Tournament	Opponent	Score	Result
2002	Malaysia Open	(Malaysia) Ong Ewe Hock	15–10, 15–6	(gold) Winner
2002	Swiss Open	(Indonesia) Marleve Mainaky	7–2, 5–7, 3–7, 8–6, 1–7	(silver) Runner-up

=== BWF International Challenge/Series ===
Men's singles
Year	Tournament	Opponent	Score	Result
1998	Malaysia Satellite	(Malaysia) Ramesh Nathan	15–8, 5–15, 15–10	(gold) Winner
