= Jeremy Gan =

Malaysian badminton player and coach

Jeremy Gan 颜伟德
Personal information
- Born: Gan Wye Teck; 24 January 1979 (age 47) Bukit Baru, Malacca, Malaysia
- Height: 1.69 m (5 ft 7 in)

Sport
- Country: Malaysia
- Sport: Badminton
- Handedness: Right
- Event: Men's & mixed doubles

Men's & mixed doubles
- BWF profile
Medal record
Men's badminton
Representing Malaysia
Asian Games
Bronze medal – third place	1998 Bangkok	Men's team
World Junior Championships
Gold medal – first place	1996 Silkeborg	Boys' doubles
Asian Junior Championships
Gold medal – first place	1997 Manila	Boys' doubles
Bronze medal – third place	1997 Manila	Boys' team

Chinese name
- Simplified Chinese: 颜伟德
- Traditional Chinese: 顏偉德
- Hanyu Pinyin: Yán WéiHong
- Hokkien POJ: Gân Ûi-Hon

Jeremy Gan Wye Teck (born 24 January 1979) is a Malaysian former badminton player, who now works as a badminton coach. Gan was a boys' doubles gold medalist at the 1996 World Junior Championships, and 1997 Asian Junior Championships partnered with Chan Chong Ming. Gan was part of the national team that won the men's team bronze at the 1998 Asian Games in Bangkok. Gan resigned from the Badminton Association of Malaysia in 2017, and moved as the mixed doubles coach at the Nippon Badminton Association starting in January 2018. In 2025, Gan was appointed the coach of Hong Kong's mixed-doubles teams.

== Achievements ==
=== World Junior Championships ===
Boys' doubles
Year	Venue	Partner	Opponent	Score	Result
1996	Silkeborg Hallerne; Silkeborg, Denmark	(Malaysia) Chan Chong Ming	(Chinese Taipei) Huang Shih-chung (Chinese Taipei) Chien Yu-hsiu	18–17, 15–7	Gold

=== Asian Junior Championships ===
Boys' doubles
Year	Venue	Partner	Opponent	Score	Result
1997	Ninoy Aquino Stadium; Manila, Philippines	(Malaysia) Chan Chong Ming	(China) Zhang Yi (China) Cai Yun	15–6, 15–3	Gold

=== IBF International ===
Men's doubles
Year	Tournament	Partner	Opponent	Score	Result
2002	Malaysia Satellite	(Malaysia) Gan Teik Chai	(South Korea) Ha Tae-kwon (South Korea) Kim Dong-moon	4–15, 0–15	(silver) Runner-up
2002	Australian International	(Malaysia) Ng Kean Kok	(Australia) Ashley Brehaut (Australia) Travis Denney	15–2, 15–7	(gold) Winner
2002	India Satellite	(Malaysia) Gan Teik Chai	(Malaysia) Ng Kean Kok (Malaysia) Tan Bin Shen	15–13, 15–5	(gold) Winner
2001	Malaysia Satellite	(Malaysia) Ng Kean Kok	(Malaysia) Chan Chong Ming (Malaysia) Hong Chieng Hun	7–4, 4–7, 7–3, 7–1	(gold) Winner
1998	India International	(Malaysia) Chan Chong Ming	(India) Jaseel P. Ismail (India) Vincent Lobo	15–10, 17–15	(gold) Winner
