= Eny Widiowati =

Indonesian badminton player

Personal information
- Born: 12 July 1980 (age 46)
- Height: 1.59 m (5 ft 3 in)

Sport
- Country: Indonesia
- Sport: Badminton
- Handedness: Right
- Event: Mixed doubles

Mixed doubles
- BWF profile
Medal record
Women's badminton
Representing Indonesia
Asia Championships
Silver medal – second place	2003 Jakarta	Mixed doubles
Bronze medal – third place	2000 Jakarta	Mixed doubles
Southeast Asian Games
Silver medal – second place	2003 Ho Chi Minh	Mixed doubles
Bronze medal – third place	2003 Ho Chi Minh	Women's team
World Junior Championships
Bronze medal – third place	1998 Melbourne	Girls' doubles
Asia Junior Championships
Silver medal – second place	1997 Manila	Girls' team
Bronze medal – third place	1997 Manila	Girls' doubles
Bronze medal – third place	1998 Kuala Lumpur	Girls' doubles
Bronze medal – third place	1998 Kuala Lumpur	Girls' team

Eny Widiowati (born 12 July 1980) is an Indonesian retired badminton player.

== Career ==
Widiowati was part of the Indonesia junior team that competed at the 1997 and 1998 Asian Junior Championships, winning a silver and bronze in the girls' team event respectively, also finished as the semifinalists in the girls' doubles event, clinched the bronze medals. She then claimed the girls' doubles bronze at the 1998 World Junior Championships in Melbourne.

Widiowati competed in badminton at the 2004 Summer Olympics in the mixed doubles with partner Anggun Nugroho. They defeated Nikolai Zuyev and Marina Yakusheva of Russia in the first round but lost to Chen Qiqiu and Zhao Tingting of China in the round of 16. She won the mixed doubles at the 2005 French Open with the Algerian-French player Nabil Lasmari.

== Personal life ==
Widiowati married two-time world champion and mixed doubles legend Nova Widianto.

== Achievements ==
=== Asian Championships ===
Mixed doubles
Year	Venue	Partner	Opponent	Score	Result
2000	Istora Senayan; Jakarta, Indonesia	(Indonesia) Santoso Sugiharjo	(Indonesia) Bambang Suprianto (Indonesia) Minarti Timur	11–15, 12–15	Bronze
2003	Tennis Indoor Gelora Bung Karno, Jakarta, Indonesia	(Indonesia) Anggun Nugroho	(Indonesia) Nova Widianto (Indonesia) Vita Marissa	2–15, 11–15	Silver

=== Southeast Asian Games ===
Mixed doubles
Year	Venue	Partner	Opponent	Score	Result
2003	Tan Binh Sport Center; Ho Chi Minh City, Vietnam	(Indonesia) Anggun Nugroho	(Thailand) Sudket Prapakamol (Thailand) Saralee Thungthongkam	12–15, 7–15	Silver

=== World Junior Championships ===
Girls' doubles
Year	Venue	Partner	Opponent	Score	Result
1998	Sports and Aquatic Centre; Melbourne, Australia	(Indonesia) Vita Marissa	(China) Gong Ruina (China) Huang Sui	15–17, 13–15	Bronze

=== Asian Junior Championships ===
Girls' doubles
Year	Venue	Partner	Opponent	Score	Result
1997	Ninoy Aquino Stadium; Manila, Philippines	(Indonesia) Vita Marissa	(China) Gao Ling (China) Yang Wei	10–15, 12–15	Bronze
1998	Kuala Lumpur Badminton Stadium; Kuala Lumpur, Malaysia	(Indonesia) Vita Marissa	(China) Gong Ruina (China) Huang Sui	16–17, 15–17	Bronze

=== IBF World Grand Prix ===
The World Badminton Grand Prix was sanctioned by the International Badminton Federation from 1983 to 2006.

Mixed doubles
Year	Tournament	Partner	Opponent	Score	Result
2001	Thailand Open	(Indonesia) Ronne Maykel Runtolalu	(Indonesia) Candra Wijaya (Indonesia) Jo Novita	6–8, 1–7, 7–8	(silver) Runner-up
2002	German Open	(Indonesia) Anggun Nugroho	(Denmark) Jonas Rasmussen (Denmark) Rikke Olsen	0–11, 6–11	(silver) Runner-up

=== IBF International ===
Women's doubles
Year	Tournament	Partner	Opponent	Score	Result
1997	Indonesia International	(Indonesia) Anita	(Indonesia) Angeline de Pauw (Indonesia) Vita Marissa	12–15, 6–15	(silver) Runner-up
1999	Singapore Satellite	(Indonesia) Angeline de Pauw	(Malaysia) Ang Li Peng (Malaysia) Chor Hooi Yee	13–15, 15–8, 5–15	(silver) Runner-up

Mixed doubles
Year	Tournament	Partner	Opponent	Score	Result
1998	Jakarta International	(Indonesia) Nova Widianto	(Indonesia) Endra Mulyajaya (Indonesia) Angeline de Pauw	4–15, 7–15	(silver) Runner-up
2005	French International	(France) Nabil Lasmari	(Denmark) Jacob Chemnitz (Denmark) Julie Houmann	4–15, 15–7, 15–13	(gold) Winner
2006	Surabaya Satellite	(Indonesia) Bambang Suprianto	(Indonesia) Tri Kusharjanto (Indonesia) Minarti Timur	10–21, 18–21	(silver) Runner-up
