= Eng Hian =

Indonesian badminton player

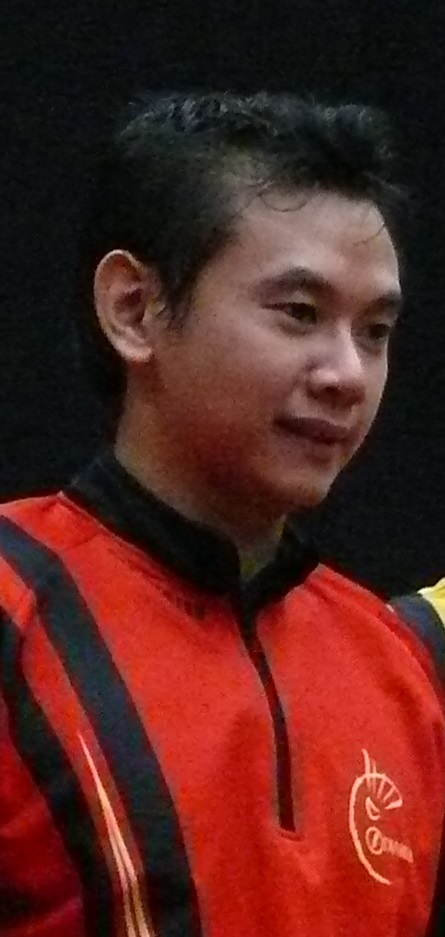

Personal information
- Nickname: Didi
- Born: 17 May 1977 (age 49) Surakarta, Central Java, Indonesia
- Spouse: Lia Baiin (m. 2003)

Sport
- Country: Indonesia (1997–2001, 2003–present); England (2001–2003)
- Sport: Badminton
- Handedness: Right
- Coached by: Christian Hadinata; Herry Iman Pierngadi

Men's doubles
- Highest ranking: 1
- BWF profile
Medal record
Men's badminton
Representing Indonesia
Olympic Games
Bronze medal – third place	2004 Athens	Men's doubles
Sudirman Cup
Silver medal – second place	2001 Seville	Mixed team
Bronze medal – third place	1999 Copenhagen	Mixed team
Thomas Cup
Bronze medal – third place	2004 Jakarta	Men's team
Asian Championships
Bronze medal – third place	1997 Kuala Lumpur	Men's doubles
Bronze medal – third place	1998 Bangkok	Men's doubles
Bronze medal – third place	2003 Jakarta	Men's doubles
Bronze medal – third place	2004 Kuala Lumpur	Men's doubles
SEA Games
Gold medal – first place	1999 Bandar Seri Begawan	Men's team
Silver medal – second place	1999 Bandar Seri Begawan	Men's doubles
World Junior Championships
Silver medal – second place	1994 Kuala Lumpur	Boys' doubles

Eng Hian (simplified Chinese: 徐永贤; traditional Chinese: 徐永賢; pinyin: Xú Yǒngxián; Pe̍h-ōe-jī: Chhî Éng-hiân; born 17 May 1977) is an Indonesian badminton player and coach. A men's doubles specialist, he won major international tournaments, most of them in partnership with Flandy Limpele, between 1999 and 2006. They earned a bronze medal in men's doubles at the 2004 Olympics in Athens. Their victories included the Korea (1999), Denmark (2000), Singapore (2002), and Japan Opens, and the Copenhagen Masters in 2000 and 2004. Hian and Limpele briefly represented England from 2001 until 2003 before returning to PBSI just in time for 2004 Summer Olympics. They were runners-up at the prestigious All-England Championships in 2002. Hian won the Dutch Open with Rian Sukmawan in 2006.

== 2004 Olympics ==
Hian competed in badminton at the 2004 Summer Olympics in men's doubles with partner Flandy Limpele. They had a bye in the first round and defeated Anthony Clark and Nathan Robertson of Great Britain in the second. In the quarterfinals, Hian and Limpele beat Yim Bang-eun and Kim Yong-hyun of South Korea 15–1, 15–10. They lost the semifinal to Kim Dong-moon and Ha Tae-kwon, also of Korea, 15–8, 15-2 but won the match against Jens Eriksen and Martin Lundgaard Hansen of Denmark 15–13, 15–7 to finish with the bronze medal.

== Controversy ==
In 2022, he was in trouble for using racist remark against Malaysian shuttlers ethnic Indian Thinaah Muralitharan and ethnic Chinese Pearly Tan during the French Open championship at Stade Pierre de Coubertin, Paris who he referred to as 'hitam' (black) and 'putih' (white) respectively. His remarks went viral online when it was caught live on television during round 16 of the match.

== Awards ==
Award	Year	Category	Result	Ref.
Candra Wijaya International Badminton Centre Awards	2017	The best women's doubles coach	Honored	
Government of Indonesia Awards	2021	Satyalancana Dharma Olahraga	Honored	

== Achievements ==
=== Olympic Games ===
Men's doubles
Year	Venue	Partner	Opponent	Score	Result	Ref.
2004	Goudi Olympic Hall; Athens, Greece	(Indonesia) Flandy Limpele	(Denmark) Jens Eriksen (Denmark) Martin Lundgaard Hansen	15–13, 15–7	Bronze	

=== Asian Championships ===
Men's doubles
Year	Venue	Partner	Opponent	Score	Result	Ref.
1997	Stadium Negara; Kuala Lumpur, Malaysia	(Indonesia) Hermono Yuwono	(Indonesia) Antonius Budi Ariantho (Indonesia) Denny Kantono	12–15, 10–15	Bronze	
1998	Nimibutr Stadium; Bangkok, Thailand	(Indonesia) Flandy Limpele	(China) Zhang Jun (China) Zhang Wei	15–17, 15–9, 12–15	Bronze	
2003	Tennis Indoor Gelora Bung Karno; Jakarta, Indonesia	(Indonesia) Flandy Limpele	(Indonesia) Markis Kido (Indonesia) Hendra Setiawan	13–15, 15–11, 7–15	Bronze	
2004	Kuala Lumpur Badminton Stadium; Kuala Lumpur, Malaysia	(Indonesia) Flandy Limpele	(Indonesia) Halim Haryanto (Indonesia) Candra Wijaya	7–15, 11–15	Bronze	

=== SEA Games ===
Men's doubles
Year	Venue	Partner	Opponent	Score	Result	Ref.
1999	Hassanal Bolkiah Sports Complex; Bandar Seri Begawan, Brunei	(Indonesia) Flandy Limpele	(Thailand) Tesana Panvisvas (Thailand) Pramote Teerawiwatana	8–15, 15–8, 13–15	Silver	

=== World Junior Championships ===
Boys' doubles
Year	Venue	Partner	Opponent	Score	Result	Ref.
1994	Kuala Lumpur Badminton Stadium; Kuala Lumpur, Malaysia	(Indonesia) Andreas	(Denmark) Peter Gade (Denmark) Peder Nissen	10–15, 11–15	Silver	

=== IBF Grand Prix (9 titles, 9 runners-up) ===
The World Badminton Grand Prix sanctioned by International Badminton Federation (IBF) since 1983.

Men's doubles
Year	Tournament	Partner	Opponent	Score	Result	Ref.
1997	Hong Kong Open	(Indonesia) Hermono Yuwono	(South Korea) Ha Tae-kwon (South Korea) Kim Dong-moon	4–15, 12–15	(silver) Runner-up	
1998	Indonesia Open	(Indonesia) Flandy Limpele	(Indonesia) Rexy Mainaky (Indonesia) Ricky Subagja	5–15, 4–15	(silver) Runner-up	
1998	Denmark Open	(Indonesia) Flandy Limpele	(Indonesia) Rexy Mainaky (Indonesia) Ricky Subagja	11–15, 6–15	(silver) Runner-up	
1999	Korea Open	(Indonesia) Flandy Limpele	(Denmark) Jens Eriksen (Denmark) Jesper Larsen	15–6, 15–7	(gold) Winner	
1999	Malaysia Open	(Indonesia) Flandy Limpele	(Indonesia) Tony Gunawan (Indonesia) Candra Wijaya	6–15, 11–15	(silver) Runner-up	
2000	Indonesia Open	(Indonesia) Flandy Limpele	(Indonesia) Tony Gunawan (Indonesia) Candra Wijaya	17–14, 6–15, 8–15	(silver) Runner-up	
2000	Denmark Open	(Indonesia) Flandy Limpele	(Denmark) Jens Eriksen (Denmark) Jesper Larsen	15–13, 15–10	(gold) Winner	
2000	Malaysia Open	(Indonesia) Flandy Limpele	(South Korea) Lee Dong-soo (South Korea) Yoo Yong-sung	15–9, 15–9	(gold) Winner	
2002	Singapore Open	(England) Flandy Limpele	(South Korea) Ha Tae-kwon (South Korea) Kim Dong-moon	15–8, 11–15, 17–14	(gold) Winner	
2002	Indonesia Open	(England) Flandy Limpele	(South Korea) Lee Dong-soo (South Korea) Yoo Yong-sung	10–15, 11–15	(silver) Runner-up	
2002	All England Open	(England) Flandy Limpele	(South Korea) Ha Tae-kwon (South Korea) Kim Dong-moon	2–7, 2–7, 7–1, 3–7	(silver) Runner-up	
2003	Swiss Open	(England) Flandy Limpele	(China) Cheng Rui (China) Chen Qiqiu	10–15, 15–5, 15–1	(gold) Winner	
2003	Japan Open	(England) Flandy Limpele	(China) Cheng Rui (China) Chen Qiqiu	15–5, 15–12	(gold) Winner	
2003	German Open	(Indonesia) Flandy Limpele	(China) Cai Yun (China) Fu Haifeng	9–15, 15–8, 15–4	(gold) Winner	
2003	Chinese Taipei Open	(Indonesia) Flandy Limpele	(South Korea) Ha Tae-kwon (South Korea) Kim Dong-moon	4–15, 1–15	(silver) Runner-up	
2005	Swiss Open	(Indonesia) Flandy Limpele	(Indonesia) Sigit Budiarto (Indonesia) Candra Wijaya	15–8, 11–15, 11–15	(silver) Runner-up	
2006	New Zealand Open	(Indonesia) Rian Sukmawan	(Singapore) Hendri Kurniawan Saputra (Singapore) Hendra Wijaya	21–13, 11–9 retired	(gold) Winner	
2006	Dutch Open	(Indonesia) Rian Sukmawan	(Indonesia) Hendra Aprida Gunawan (Indonesia) Joko Riyadi	21–15, 21–10	(gold) Winner	

=== IBF International (1 runner-up) ===
Men's doubles
Year	Tournament	Partner	Opponent	Score	Result	Ref.
1997	Indonesia International	(Indonesia) Hermono Yuwono	(Indonesia) Davis Efraim (Indonesia) Halim Haryanto	5–15, 5–15	(silver) Runner-up	

=== IBF Junior International (2 titles) ===
Boys' doubles
Year	Tournament	Partner	Opponent	Score	Result	Ref.
1995	Dutch Junior	(Indonesia) Karel Mainaky			(gold) Winner	
1995	German Junior	(Indonesia) Karel Mainaky	(Denmark) Peter Gade (Denmark) Peder Nissen		(gold) Winner	

=== Invitational tournaments ===
Men's doubles
Year	Tournament	Partner	Opponent	Score	Result	Ref.
1999	Ipoh Masters	(Indonesia) Flandy Limpele	(Indonesia) Candra Wijaya (Indonesia) Tony Gunawan	11–15, 9–15	(silver) Runner-up	
2000	Copenhagen Masters	(Indonesia) Flandy Limpele	(Indonesia) Tony Gunawan (Indonesia) Halim Haryanto	8–7, 5–7, 7–4, 5–7, 7–5	(gold) Winner	
2004	Copenhagen Masters	(Indonesia) Flandy Limpele	(China) Sang Yang (China) Zheng Bo	15–13, 15–5	(gold) Winner	
