= Anton Gargiulo =

New Zealand badminton player

Medal record

Men's badminton

Representing New Zealand

Commonwealth Games
Bronze medal – third place	1998 Kuala Lumpur	Team

Anton P. Gargiulo is a male badminton competitor for New Zealand. At the 1998 Commonwealth Games he won a bronze medal in the men's team event.
