= Xia Xuanze =

Chinese badminton player

Xia Xuanze 夏煊泽
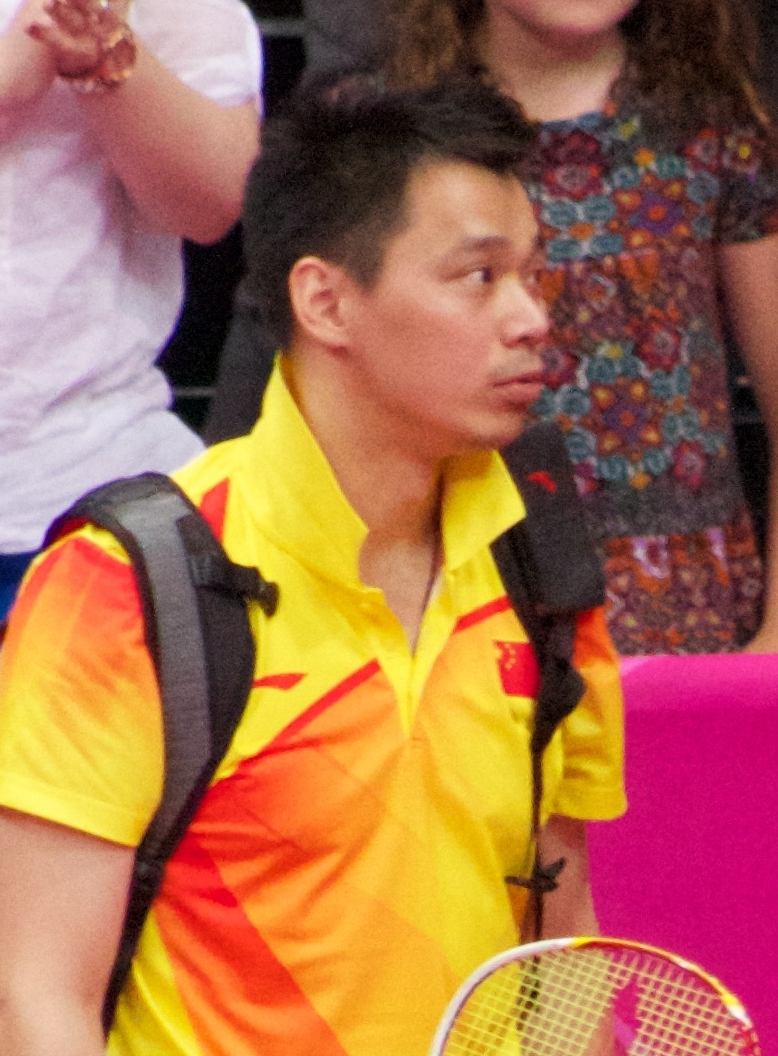
- Xia at the 2012 Summer Olympics

Personal information
- Born: 5 January 1979 (age 47) Rui'an, Wenzhou, Zhejiang, China
- Height: 1.78 m (5 ft 10 in)
- Weight: 70 kg (154 lb)

Sport
- Country: China
- Sport: Badminton
- Handedness: Right
- Event: Men's singles
Medal record
Men's badminton
Representing China
Olympic Games
Bronze medal – third place	2000 Sydney	Men's singles
World Championships
Gold medal – first place	2003 Birmingham	Men's singles
Thomas Cup
Gold medal – first place	2004 Jakarta	Men's team
Gold medal – first place	2006 Sendai–Tokyo	Men's team
Silver medal – second place	2000 Kuala Lumpur	Men's team
Bronze medal – third place	2002 Guangzhou	Men's team
Asian Games
Bronze medal – third place	2002 Busan	Men's team
Asia Championships
Gold medal – first place	2001 Manila	Men's singles
Bronze medal – third place	2002 Bangkok	Men's singles
East Asian Games
Silver medal – second place	1997 Busan	Men's team
World Junior Championships
Bronze medal – third place	1996 Silkeborg	Boys' singles
Asia Junior Championships
Gold medal – first place	1997 Manila	Boys' team
Bronze medal – third place	1997 Manila	Boys' singles
Bronze medal – third place	1997 Manila	Boys' doubles

Xia Xuanze
- Traditional Chinese: 夏煊澤
- Simplified Chinese: 夏煊泽
Transcriptions
Standard Mandarin
- Hanyu Pinyin: Xià Xuānzé

Xia Xuanze (born 5 January 1979) is a former badminton player from China who played singles at the world level from the late 1990s through the first few years of the 21st century. Previously he was served as the vice chairman of the Chinese Badminton Association and a singles coach for the national team of China.

== Career ==
At one time or another he experienced victory in most of badminton's biggest events. The exception came in his sole appearance at the Olympics when he was beaten in the semifinals of the 2000 Games in Sydney by Indonesia's Hendrawan. Xia settled for a bronze medal there after defeating Denmark's Peter Gade in the playoff for third place. Earlier in that season, Xia had won the prestigious All-England Championships over eighteen-year-old Taufik Hidayat. He captured men's singles at the IBF World Championships in 2003 by defeating Malaysia's Wong Choong Hann. Finally, in international team play, he was a member of the Chinese squad that ended a long drought by capturing the highly coveted Thomas Cup (men's world team competition and trophy) in 2004.

In the 2010 Thomas Cup, Xia coached Chen Jin, witnessing his country win 3–0 over Indonesia for their fourth consecutive Thomas Cup.

In 2017, Xia Xuanze together with Zhang Jun replaced Li Yongbo as head coach of the Chinese badminton team.

Xia was elected as the vice chairman of the Chinese Badminton Association in January 2019. In 2021, he was appointed as a singles coach for the national team of China.

=== Investigation ===
On 31 August 2026, Xia was placed investigation by the Central Commission for Discipline Inspection and the National Supervisory Commission, for alleged "serious violations of discipline and laws".

== Player attributes ==
Xia's game was marked by impressive speed and agility, aggressive and accurate net play, and adequate, if not overwhelming, overhead power. The power he used in his legs allowed him to "play the shot" very early. This attribute, combined with very sophisticated and consistent deceptive shots, gave some of his opponents the opportunity to win very few points at all.

== Achievements ==
=== Olympic Games ===
Men's singles
Year	Venue	Opponent	Score	Result
2000	Pavilion 3, Sydney Olympic Park, Sydney, Australia	(Denmark) Peter Gade	15–13, 15–5	Bronze

=== World Championships ===
Men's singles
Year	Venue	Opponent	Score	Result
2003	National Indoor Arena, Birmingham, United Kingdom	(Malaysia) Wong Choong Hann	15–6, 13–15, 15–6	Gold

=== Asian Championships ===
Men's singles
Year	Venue	Opponent	Score	Result
2001	PhilSports Arena, Manila, Philippines	(China) Lin Dan	15–10, 15–9	Gold
2002	Nimibutr Stadium, Bangkok, Thailand	(Indonesia) Taufik Hidayat	2–15, 11–15	Bronze

=== World Junior Championships ===
Boys' singles
Year	Venue	Opponent	Score	Result
1996	Silkeborg-Hallerne, Silkeborg, Denmark	(Indonesia) Rudy Ignatius	16–17, 14–17	Bronze

=== Asian Junior Championships ===
Boys' singles
Year	Venue	Opponent	Score	Result
1997	Ninoy Aquino Stadium, Manila, Philippines	(Indonesia) Taufik Hidayat	15–2, 16–17, 4–15	Bronze

Boys' doubles
Year	Venue	Partner	Opponent	Score	Result
1997	Ninoy Aquino Stadium, Manila, Philippines	(China) Chen Hong	(China) Cai Yun (China) Zhang Yi	6–15, 6–15	Bronze

=== IBF World Grand Prix (8 titles, 5 runners-up) ===
The World Badminton Grand Prix sanctioned by International Badminton Federation (IBF) from 1983 to 2006.

Men's singles
Year	Tournament	Opponent	Score	Result
1999	German Open	(India) Pullela Gopichand	15–4, 13–15, 15–4	(gold) Winner
1999	Dutch Open	(China) Ji Xinpeng	15–10, 15–13	(gold) Winner
2000	All England Open	(Indonesia) Taufik Hidayat	15–6, 15–13	(gold) Winner
2000	Swiss Open	(China) Ji Xinpeng	15–8, 15–6	(gold) Winner
2000	Malaysia Open	(Indonesia) Taufik Hidayat	10–15, 14–17	(silver) Runner-up
2000	World Grand Prix Finals	(Indonesia) Marleve Mainaky	7–4, 7–5, 2–7, 8–6	(gold) Winner
2001	China Open	(Malaysia) Wong Choong Hann	3–7, 7–3, 2–7, 7–5, 7–4	(gold) Winner
2002	Japan Open	(South Korea) Lee Hyun-il	7–5, 5–7, 7–0, 5–7, 2–5	(silver) Runner-up
2003	Japan Open	(China) Lin Dan	15–12, 15–10	(gold) Winner
2004	Korea Open	(China) Chen Hong	15–9, 17–15	(gold) Winner
2004	Denmark Open	(China) Lin Dan	12–15, 11–15	(silver) Runner-up
2004	German Open	(China) Lin Dan	16–17, 9–15	(silver) Runner-up
2006	Swiss Open	(Malaysia) Lee Chong Wei	8–15, 0–15	(silver) Runner-up
