= Tam Kai Chuen =

Hong Kong badminton player (born 1976)

Tam Kai Chuen 譚啟銓
Personal information
- Born: 6 September 1976 (age 49)
- Height: 1.74 m (5 ft 9 in)
- Weight: 65 kg (143 lb)

Sport
- Country: Hong Kong
- Sport: Badminton
- Handedness: Left
- Event: Men's singles & doubles

Men's singles & doubles
- BWF profile
Medal record
Men's badminton
Representing Hong Kong
Commonwealth Games
Bronze medal – third place	1994 Victoria	Mixed team

Tam Kai Chuen (Chinese: 譚啟銓; Jyutping: taam^{4} kai^{2} cyun^{4}; born 6 September 1976) is a badminton player from Hong Kong. He represented Hong Kong at the 2000 Summer Olympics, 1998 Asian Games, 1997 East Asian Games, and 1994 Commonwealth Games.

== Achievements ==
=== IBF World Grand Prix ===
The World Badminton Grand Prix sanctioned by International Badminton Federation (IBF) since 1983.

Men's singles

Year	Tournament	Opponent	Score	Result
1999	Hong Kong Open	(China) Chen Wei	12–15, 4–15	(silver) Runner-up
1997	Polish Open	(Denmark) Thomas Søgaard	15–4, 15–11	(gold) Winner

=== IBF International ===
Men's singles

Year	Tournament	Opponent	Score	Result
1999	Victoria International	(Hong Kong) Ng Wei	5–15, 6–15	(silver) Runner-up
1999	Argentina International	(Hong Kong) Ng Wei	15–9, 15–9	(gold) Winner
1996	New Zealand International	(New Zealand) Nick Hall	15–9, 15–11	(gold) Winner
1996	Australian International	(Australia) Shen Yifeng	15–18, 15–12, 15–11	(gold) Winner
1995	New Zealand International	(New Zealand) Nick Hall	15–9, 15–13	(gold) Winner

Mixed doubles

Year	Tournament	Partner	Opponent	Score	Result
1996	New Zealand International	(Hong Kong) Tung Chau Man	(New Zealand) Dean Galt (New Zealand) Tammy Jenkins	18–14, 15–11	(gold) Winner
1996	Australian International	(Hong Kong) Tung Chau Man	(Australia) Peter Blackburn (Australia) Rhonda Cator	15–11, 14–17, 6–15	(silver) Runner-up
