= Chen Qiqiu =

Chinese badminton player (born 1978)

Chen Qiqiu 陈其遒
Personal information
- Born: January 4, 1978 (age 48) Meizhou, Guangdong, China
- Height: 1.71 m (5 ft 7 in)

Sport
- Country: China
- Sport: Badminton
- Handedness: Left

Mixed doubles
- Highest ranking: 2
- BWF profile
Medal record
Men's badminton
Representing China
World Championships
Bronze medal – third place	2003 Birmingham	Mixed doubles
Sudirman Cup
Gold medal – first place	2005 Beijing	Mixed team
Silver medal – second place	2003 Eindhoven	Mixed team
Thomas Cup
Gold medal – first place	2004 Jakarta	Men's team
Silver medal – second place	2000 Kuala Lumpur	Men's team
Bronze medal – third place	2002 Guangzhou	Men's team
Asian Games
Bronze medal – third place	2002 Busan	Mixed doubles
Bronze medal – third place	2002 Busan	Men's team

Chen Qiqiu (simplified Chinese: 陈其遒; traditional Chinese: 陳其遒; pinyin: Chén Qíqiú; born January 4, 1978, in Meizhou, Guangdong, China) is a former badminton player from the People's Republic of China. He is now a doubles coach for the Chinese national team.

== Career ==
A doubles specialist who has paired with a variety of partners, Chen won men's doubles at the Thailand Open in 1999 and the Malaysia Open in 2002. He won mixed doubles at the Polish (2000), Thailand (2003), and Denmark (2004) Opens. He was also a runner-up in mixed doubles at the prestigious All-England Championships in 2003 with Zhao Tingting, the partner with whom he had his greatest success. They were bronze medalists at the 2003 IBF World Championships and quarterfinalists at the 2004 Olympic Games in Athens.

== Achievements ==
=== World Championships ===
Mixed Doubles
Year	Tournament	Partner	Opponent	Score	Result
2003	National Indoor Arena, Birmingham, England	(China) Zhao Tingting	(South Korea) Kim Dong-moon (South Korea) Ra Kyung-min	7–15, 5–15	Bronze

=== Asian Games ===
Mixed Doubles
Year	Venue	Partner	Opponent	Score	Result
2002	Gangseo Gymnasium, Busan, South Korea	(China) Zhang Jiewen	(South Korea) Kim Dong-moon (South Korea) Ra Kyung-min	6–11, 0–11	Bronze

=== IBF World Grand Prix ===
The World Badminton Grand Prix sanctioned by International Badminton Federation (IBF) from 1983 to 2006.

Men's doubles
Year	Tournament	Partner	Opponent	Score	Result
1999	Thailand Open	(China) Yu Jinhao	(Denmark) Michael Søgaard (Denmark) Jim Laugesen	15–11, 15–13	(gold) Winner
2001	China Open	(China) Liu Yong	(China) Zhang Wei (China) Zhang Jun	1–7, 7–4, 6–8, 7–4, 5–7	(silver) Runner-up
2002	Malaysia Open	(China) Liu Yong	(Malaysia) Chang Kim Wai (Malaysia) Choong Tan Fook	17–14, 15–3	(gold) Winner
2003	Japan Open	(China) Cheng Rui	(Indonesia) Eng Hian (Indonesia) Flandy Limpele	5–15, 12–15	(silver) Runner-up
2003	Swiss Open	(China) Cheng Rui	(Indonesia) Eng Hian (Indonesia) Flandy Limpele	15–10, 5–15, 1–15	(silver) Runner-up

Mixed doubles
Year	Tournament	Partner	Opponent	Score	Result
1998	Dutch Open	(China) Yang Wei	(Denmark) Jon Holst-Christensen (Denmark) Ann Jorgensen	7–15, 6–15	(silver) Runner-Up
1999	Dutch Open	(China) Chen Lin	(Denmark) Martin Lundgaard Hansen (Denmark) Pernille Harder	15–11, 9–15, 15–10	(gold) Winner
2000	Dutch Open	(China) Chen Lin	(England) Simon Archer (Netherlands) Erica Van Den Heuvel	8–15, 15–12, 15–10	(gold) Winner
2002	China Open	(China) Zhao Tingting	(China) Zhang Jun (China) Gao Ling	4–11, 4–11	(silver) Runner-up
2003	Thailand Open	(China) Zhao Tingting	(England) Nathan Robertson (England) Gail Emms	11–4, 8–11, 11–0	(gold) Winner
2003	All England Open	(China) Zhao Tingting	(China) Zhang Jun (China) Gao Ling	6–11, 7–11	(silver) Runner-up
2003	China Open	(China) Zhao Tingting	(China) Zhang Jun (China) Gao Ling	13–15, 6–15	(silver) Runner-up
2004	Denmark Open	(China) Zhao Tingting	(England) Nathan Robertson (England) Gail Emms	15–4, 15–11	(gold) Winner
2004	German Open	(China) Zhao Tingting	(Denmark) Carsten Mogensen (Denmark) Rikke Olsen	15–12, 8–15, 9–15	(silver) Runner-up
2004	China Open	(China) Zhao Tingting	(Denmark) Jens Eriksen (Denmark) Mette Schjoldager	13–15, 15–13, 8–15	(silver) Runner-up
2005	Malaysia Open	(China) Zhao Tingting	(South Korea) Lee Jae-jin (South Korea) Lee Hyo-jung	12–15, 11–15	(silver) Runner-up

=== IBF International ===
Mixed doubles
Year	Tournament	Partner	Opponent	Score	Result
2000	Polish Open	(China) Chen Lin	(Ukraine) Vladislav Druzchenko (Ukraine) Victoria Evtoushenko	15–7, 15–8	(gold) Winner
