= Badminton Asia Cup =

Badminton Championships

The Asia Cup was the Asian championship for men's badminton teams. It was held in 1997, 1999 and 2001. Until 1993 the team title holders were determined together with the individual title holders at the Asian Championships. From 1994 the team competitions were taken from the program of the Asian Championships, so that the Asia Cup was brought into being. After three events, however, the competition was already exhausted.

== Description ==
The Asian Badminton Confederation, realizing the importance attached to team events amongst Asian countries, introduced the first Asia Cup championship in the year 1997. It was a men's team event comprising two singles event and a doubles match. Eight teams were invited to take part in the competition. The eight teams were divided into two groups of four. The teams in each group played each other in a round robin format. The champion of the first group met the runners-up of the second group and vice versa in the crossover semifinals. The winners of the semifinals met in the finals to determine who was the champion. The losers of the semifinals also met to determine the third and fourth positions. The breakdown of prize money is as follows.

- Champion Team : US$100,000
- Runner-up : US$ 60,000
- 2^{nd} Runner-up : US$ 40,000
- 4^{th} placed team : US$20,000
- 5^{th} to 8^{th} placed teams got US$5,000 each

== Venues ==
Year	Edition	City	Country
1997	I	Jakarta	Indonesia
1999	II	Ho Chi Minh City	Vietnam
2001	III	Singapore	Singapore

== Results ==
Year	Gold	Silver	Bronze
1997	Indonesia	Malaysia	Chinese Taipei
1999	Indonesia	Malaysia	South Korea
2001	China	South Korea	Indonesia
