= JYSK Arena =

Sports venue in Silkeborg, Denmark

Jysk Arena
- Interactive map of Jysk Arena
- Full name: Jysk Arena
- Location: Ansvej 114; 8600 Silkeborg
- Coordinates: 56°11′3.85″N 9°34′22.09″E
- Capacity: 3.000 (2.000 seats)
- Field size: 90 x 62 m

Construction
- Renovated: 2012
- Cost: 19 million DKK

Tenants
- Bjerringbro Silkeborg; Silkeborg-Voel KFUM

JYSK Arena, or Silkeborg-Hallerne, is a complex of indoor sports arenas in Silkeborg, Denmark used for several sports, but primarily handball. The arena is home to Danish Handball League team Bjerringbro-Silkeborg Håndbold.

In 2014 Silkeborg-Hallerne was renovated, so that the hall is now bigger at 6000 square meters Besides making the hall larger, work was done to floors, lighting, stands and replacement of the big screen replaced. The hall was renamed JYSK Arena as Jysk was main sponsor of the rebuilding.

== See also ==
- JYSK Park
