= 2007 BWF World Championships – Men's singles =

Badminton championships

Men's singles at the 2007 BWF World Championships
- Venue: Putra Indoor Stadium
- Location: Kuala Lumpur, Malaysia
- Dates: August 13, 2007 – August 19, 2007

Medalists
gold medal	Lin Dan	China
silver medal	Sony Dwi Kuncoro	Indonesia
bronze medal	Bao Chunlai	China
bronze medal	Chen Yu	China

This article list the results of men's singles category in the 2007 BWF World Championships (World Badminton Championships).

== Seeds ==
1. (China) Lin Dan (world champion)
2. (Malaysia) Lee Chong Wei (third round)
3. (China) Chen Jin (third round)
4. (China) Bao Chunlai (semi-final)
5. (Denmark) Peter Gade (quarter-final)
6. (China) Chen Yu (semi-final)
7. (Denmark) Kenneth Jonassen (quarter-final)
8. (Indonesia) Taufik Hidayat (second round)

9. (Indonesia) Sony Dwi Kuncoro (final)
10. (Japan) Shoji Sato (second round)
11. (Singapore) Ronald Susilo (quarter-final)
12. (Poland) Przemysław Wacha (third round)
13. (Malaysia) Muhammad Hafiz Hashim (third round)
14. (South Korea) Park Sung-hwan (third round)
15. (Netherlands) Dicky Palyama (third round)
16. (Indonesia) Simon Santoso (third round)

Click on the seed number of a player to go to their draw section.

== Draw ==
=== Finals ===
Semi-finals
1	(China) Lin Dan	21	22
4	(China) Bao Chunlai	12	20
6	(China) Chen Yu	21	13	15
9	(Indonesia) Sony Dwi Kuncoro	18	21	21

Final
1	(China) Lin Dan	21	22
9	(Indonesia) Sony Dwi Kuncoro	11	20

=== Section 1 ===
First Round
(Germany) R Spitko	22	15	12
(Hong Kong) Ng W	20	21	21
15	(Netherlands) D Palyama	21	21
(Iran) K Mehrabi	15	13
(Philippines) K Asuncion	17	10
(Algeria) N Lasmari	21	21
8	(Indonesia) T Hidayat	21	21
(Spain) J A Crespo	13	7
(India) A Sridhar	21	21
(Austria) J Koch	15	19
13	(Malaysia) H Hashim	21	21
(Australia) S Gomez	8	7
(United States) E Go	12	21	17
(Republic of Ireland) S Evans	21	14	21

Second Round
1	(China) Lin D	21	21
(Hong Kong) Ng W	8	10
15	(Netherlands) D Palyama	21	14	21
(Algeria) N Lasmari	18	21	11
8	(Indonesia) T Hidayat	14	26	20
(India) A Sridhar	21	24	22
13	(Malaysia) H Hashim	21	14	21
(Republic of Ireland) S Evans	19	21	11

Third Round
1	(China) Lin D	21	21
15	(Netherlands) D Palyama	18	17
(India) A Sridhar	21	18	21
13	(Malaysia) H Hashim	19	21	15

Quarter-finals
1	(China) Lin D	22	21
(India) A Sridhar	20	9

=== Section 2 ===
First Round
(Malaysia) Lee T S	21	21
(Czech Republic) P Koukal	16	8
10	(Japan) S Satō	21	21
(Canada) B Milroy	9	15
(Singapore) K Lee Y H	7	21	18
(South Korea) Lee H-i	21	9	21
7	(Denmark) K Jonassen	21	21
(Guatemala) P Yang	4	8
(Lithuania) K Navickas	15	21	12
(England) N Kidd	21	10	21
12	(Poland) P Wacha	21	13	21
(Finland) V Lång	6	21	16
(France) S Maunoury	23	21
(Italy) K Raffeiner	21	16

Second Round
4	(China) Bao CL	21	18	21
(Malaysia) Lee T S	14	21	18
10	(Japan) S Satō	19	15
(South Korea) Lee H-i	21	21
7	(Denmark) K Jonassen	21	21
(England) N Kidd	14	7
12	(Poland) P Wacha	21	21
(France) S Maunoury	18	10

Third Round
4	(China) Bao CL	21	21
(South Korea) Lee H-i	19	11
7	(Denmark) K Jonassen	21	21
12	(Poland) P Wacha	11	12

Quarter-finals
4	(China) Bao CL	21	21
7	(Denmark) K Jonassen	18	15

=== Section 3 ===
First Round
(Canada) A Dabeka	16	21	21
(Ukraine) V Druzchenko	21	18	16
(Australia) J Tho	14	6
14	(South Korea) Park S-h	21	21
(Estonia) R Must	12	11
(Germany) B Joppien	21	21
(New Zealand) J Moody	13	11
6	(China) Chen Y	21	21
(France) E Kehlhoffner	9	20
(Wales) R Vaughan	21	22
(Scotland) A Casey	20	12
11	(Singapore) R Susilo	22	21
(Malaysia) R Hashim	21	21
(Sweden) M Sahlberg	17	9
(Portugal) M Vasconcelos	9	5
3	(China) Chen J	21	21

Second Round
(Canada) A Dabeka	16	5
14	(South Korea) Park S-h	21	21
(Germany) B Joppien	15	7
6	(China) Chen Y	21	21
(Wales) R Vaughan	17	17
11	(Singapore) R Susilo	21	21
(Malaysia) R Hashim	20	11
3	(China) Chen J	22	21

Third Round
14	(South Korea) Park S-h	21	16	15
6	(China) Chen Y	15	21	21
11	(Singapore) R Susilo	21	21
3	(China) Chen J	19	14

Quarter-finals
6	(China) Chen Y	21	21
11	(Singapore) R Susilo	14	16

=== Section 4 ===
First Round
(Spain) P Abián	21	29
(Slovenia) L Petrič	9	27
(Vietnam) Nguyễn T M	22	11	19
16	(Indonesia) S Santoso	20	21	21
(Hong Kong) Chan Y K	21	21
(Czech Republic) J Fröhlich	15	9
(England) A Smith	18	10
5	(Denmark) P Gade	21	21
(Japan) Y Nakanishi	21	14	21
(Switzerland) C Bösiger	16	21	8
(India) C Anand	21	14	18
9	(Indonesia) S D Kuncoro	11	21	21
(Russia) S Ivlev	15	6
(Netherlands) E Pang	21	21

Second Round
(Spain) P Abián	18	15
16	(Indonesia) S Santoso	21	21
(Hong Kong) Chan Y K	18	23
5	(Denmark) P Gade	21	25
(Japan) Y Nakanishi	15	16
9	(Indonesia) S D Kuncoro	21	21
(Netherlands) E Pang	7	11
2	(Malaysia) Lee C W	21	21

Third Round
16	(Indonesia) S Santoso	21	15	16
5	(Denmark) P Gade	18	21	21
9	(Indonesia) S Kuncoro	21	21
2	(Malaysia) Lee C W	11	9

Quarter-finals
5	(Denmark) P Gade	20	18
9	(Indonesia) S D Kuncoro	22	21

== Sources ==
- Tournamentsoftware.com: 2007 World Championships - Men's singles
