= 2004 All England Open Badminton Championships =

2004 All England Championships
Tournament details
- Dates: 9 March 2004– 14 March 2004
- Edition: 94th
- Location: Birmingham

The 2004 Yonex All England Open was the 94th edition of the All England Open Badminton Championships. It was held in Birmingham, England, from 9 to 14 March 2004, and the prize money was US$125,000 or £69,471.

== Venue ==
- National Indoor Arena

== Final results ==
Category	Winners	Runners-up	Score
Men's singles	(China) Lin Dan	(Denmark) Peter Gade	9–15, 15–5, 15–8
Women's singles	(China) Gong Ruina	(China) Zhou Mi	11–7, 11–7
Men's doubles	(Denmark) Jens Eriksen & Martin Lundgaard Hansen	(Malaysia) Lee Wan Wah & Choong Tan Fook	9–15, 15–13, 15–3
Women's doubles	(China) Gao Ling & Huang Sui	(China) Yang Wei & Zhang Jiewen	walkover
Mixed doubles	(South Korea) Kim Dong-moon & Ra Kyung-min	(South Korea) Kim Yong-hyun & Lee Hyo-jung	15–8, 17–15

== Men's singles ==
=== Section 1 ===
Round of 32
(China) Lin Dan	15	15
(Indonesia) Simon Santoso	5	9
(Hong Kong) Ng Wei	15	15
(India) Nikhil Kanetkar	7	2
(Indonesia) Sony Dwi Kuncoro	15	15
(Malaysia) Beng Hong Kuan	8	11
(South Korea) Shon Seung-mo	15	15
(Indonesia) Marleve Mainaky	0	0
(Singapore) Ronald Susilo	15	15
(Japan) Yousuke Nakanishi	13	7
(England) Aamir Ghaffar	7	15	15
(China) Bao Chunlai	15	10	3
(Denmark) Anders Boesen	15	15
(Canada) Bobby Milroy	9	12
(Malaysia) Muhammad Hafiz Hashim	15	15
(Malaysia) Choong Hann Wong	3	3

Round of 16
(China) Lin Dan	15	15
(Hong Kong) Ng Wei	6	2
(Indonesia) Kuncoro	15	17
(South Korea) Seung-mo	11	14
(Singapore) Susilo	15	15
(England) Ghaffar	5	6
(Denmark) Boesen	15	15
(Malaysia) Hafiz Hashim	9	8

Quarter-finals
(China) Lin Dan	15	15
(Indonesia) Kuncoro	10	1
(Singapore) Susilo	15	9	15
(Denmark) Boesen	9	15	9

Semi-finals
(China) Lin Dan	15	15
(Singapore) Susilo	6	10

=== Section 2 ===
Round of 32
(Denmark) Peter Gade	15	15
(Indonesia) Wiempie Mahardi	7	10
(China) Chen Hong	15	15
(India) Abhinn Shyam Gupta	8	5
(Malaysia) Muhammad Roslin Hashim	15	15
(Taiwan) Liao Sheng-Shiun	12	2
(Denmark) Kenneth Jonassen	15	15
(India) Chetan Anand	4	5
(Indonesia) Taufik Hidayat	15	15
(Poland) Stefan Wojcikiewicz	3	5
(Wales) Richard Vaughan	15	7	15
(China) Xia Xuanze	9	15	10
(China) Chen Yu	15	10	15
(Russia) Stanislav Pukhov	7	15	9
(South Korea) Lee Hyun-il	15	17
(Malaysia) Tsuen Seng Lee	13	14

Round of 16
(Denmark) Gade	15	11	15
(China) Chen Hong	13	15	8
(Malaysia) Roslin Hashim	7	17	15
(Denmark) Jonassen	15	14	14
(Indonesia) Hidayat	15	15
(Wales) Vaughan	11	4
(China) Chen Yu	15	15
(South Korea) Hyun-il	5	5

Quarter-finals
(Denmark) Gade	15	9	15
(Malaysia) Roslin Hashim	4	15	10
(Indonesia) Hidayat	15	15
(China) Chen Yu	8	8

Semi-finals
(Denmark) Gade	15	15
(Indonesia) Hidayat	9	9

== Women's singles ==
=== Section 1 ===
Round of 32
(China) Gong Ruina	11	11
(Netherlands) Karina De Wit	7	4
(South Korea) Kyeung Ran Kim	11	11
(Scotland) Susan Hughes	8	3
(Sweden) Marina Andrievskaya	11	11
(Japan) Eriko Hirose	7	7
(France) Tatiana Vattier	2	1	w/o
(Denmark) Camilla Martin	11	2	ret
(Netherlands) Mia Audina	11	11
(Iceland) Ragna Ingólfsdóttir	5	5
(Malaysia) Wang Mew Choo	5	11	11
(Germany) Petra Overzier	11	4	4
(Hong Kong) Wang Chen	11	3	11
(Germany) Juliane Schenk	8	11	5
(Japan) Kanako Yonekura	11	11
(Netherlands) Judith Meulendijks	9	9

Round of 16
(China) Ruina	11	11
(South Korea) Ran Kim	1	2
(Sweden) Andrievskaya	11	11
(France) Vattier	0	2
(Netherlands) Audina	11	11
(Malaysia) Wong	5	5
(Hong Kong) Wang Chen	11	11
(Japan) Yonekura	6	4

Quarter-finals
(China) Ruina	8	11	11
(Sweden) Andrievskaya	11	9	6
(Netherlands) Audina	11	11
(Hong Kong) Wang Chen	5	0

Semi-finals
(China) Ruina	11	11
(Netherlands) Audina	7	3

=== Section 2 ===
Round of 32
(China) Zhou Mi	11	11
(Peru) Lorena Blanco	0	0
(South Korea) Jae Youn Jun	11	11
(China) Dai Yun	8	8
(China) Xie Xingfang	11	11
(Russia) Ella Karachkova	5	0
(Netherlands) Yao Jie	11	11
(Hong Kong) Ling Wan Ting	8	8
(China) Zhang Ning	11	11
(England) Julia Mann	4	3
(Denmark) Tine Rasmussen	11	6	11
(Japan) Kaori Mori	4	11	8
(France) Pi Hongyan	11	11
(Finland) Anu Weckström	7	0
(South Korea) Jung Eun Ha	11	11
(Taiwan) Cheng Shao-chieh	7	5

Round of 16
(China) Zhou Mi	11	11
(South Korea) Youn Jun	1	7
(China) Xingfang	13	11
(Netherlands) Yao Jie	11	8
(China) Zhang Ning	11	11
(Denmark) Rasmussen	5	5
(France) Hongyan	11	11
(South Korea) Eun Ha	0	0

Quarter-finals
(China) Zhou Mi	11	13
(China) Xingfang	6	12
(China) Zhang Ning	11	11
(France) Hongyan	3	2

Semi-finals
(China) Zhou Mi	11	10	11
(China) Zhang Ning	4	13	4
