= 2006 IBF World Championships – Men's singles =

Badminton championships

Men's Singles at the 2006 IBF World Championships
- Venue: Palacio de Deportes de la Comunidad de Madrid
- Location: Madrid, Spain
- Dates: September 18, 2006 – September 24, 2006

Medalists
gold medal	Lin Dan	China
silver medal	Bao Chunlai	China
bronze medal	Chen Hong	China
bronze medal	Lee Hyun-il	South Korea

The men's singles tournament of the 2006 World Championships were held in Madrid, Spain, from September 18 to 24, 2006. In the men's singles final, Lin Dan defeated Bao Chunlai with a score of 2–1 (18–21, 21–17, 21–12) to claim the title. This was Lin's first World Championship victory, marking the beginning of his peak dominance in badminton.

== Seeds ==
1. (Malaysia) Lee Chong Wei
2. (China) Lin Dan
3. (China) Chen Jin
4. (Denmark) Peter Gade
5. (South Korea) Lee Hyun-il
6. (Malaysia) Muhammad Hafiz Hashim
7. (China) Chen Hong
8. (China) Bao Chunlai
9. (Poland) Przemysław Wacha
10. (Thailand) Boonsak Ponsana
11. (Netherlands) Eric Pang
12. (Netherlands) Dicky Palyama
13. (Hong Kong) Ng Wei
14. (South Korea) Park Sung-hwan
15. (Denmark) Joachim Persson
16. (England) Andrew Smith

== Results ==
=== Section 1 ===
First Round
1	(Malaysia) Lee Chong Wei
Bye
(Singapore) Kendrick Lee Yen Hui	17	21	20
(Germany) Björn Joppien	21	18	22
15	(Denmark) Joachim Persson	22	21
(South Korea) Shon Seung-mo	20	13
(Peru) Rodrigo Pacheco	14	14
(Slovenia) Luka Petrič	21	21
8	(China) Bao Chunlai	21	21
(Russia) Stanislav Pukhov	15	12
(Austria) Jürgen Koch	21	21
(Canada) Andrew Dabeka	12	18
16	(England) Andrew Smith	21	21
(Spain) Pablo Abián	15	13
(Indonesia) Sony Dwi Kuncoro	21	21
(Estonia) Raul Must	14	10

Second Round
1	(Malaysia) Lee	21	21
(Germany) Joppien	18	14
15	(Denmark) Persson	21	21
(Slovenia) Petrič	11	8
8	(China) Bao	21	21
(Austria) Koch	13	14
16	(England) Smith	19	13
(Indonesia) Kuncoro	21	21

Third Round
1	(Malaysia) Lee	21	21
15	(Denmark) Persson	16	12
8	(China) Bao	21	21
(Indonesia) Kuncoro	14	19

Quarter Finals
1	(Malaysia) Lee
8	(China) Bao

=== Section 2 ===
First Round
3	(China) Chen Jin
Bye
(Italy) Klaus Raffeiner	5	10
(Vietnam) Nguyễn Tiến Minh	21	21
9	(Poland) Przemysław Wacha	21	21
(Wales) Martyn Lewis	14	13
(Malaysia) Kuan Beng Hong	21	21
(Australia) Stuart Gomez	14	12
5	(South Korea) Lee Hyun-il	21	18	21
(India) Chetan Anand	18	21	10
(Czech Republic) Jan Frohlich	21	21
(France) Jean-Michel Lefort	9	17
11	(Netherlands) Eric Pang	21	21
(Hong Kong) Chan Yan Kit	11	14
(Chinese Taipei) Hsieh Yu-hsing	19	15
(Japan) Yousuke Nakanishi	21	21

Second Round
3	(China) Chen	21	21
(Vietnam) Nguyễn	16	13
9	(Poland) Wacha	16	21	19
(Malaysia) Kuan	21	9	21
5	(South Korea) Lee	21	21
(Czech Republic) Fröhlich	10	4
11	(Netherlands) Pang	21	21
(Japan) Nakanishi	15	17

Third Round
3	(China) Chen	21	18	21
(Malaysia) Kuan	18	21	18
5	(South Korea) Lee	21	21
11	(Netherlands) Pang	16	6

Quarter Finals
3	(China) Chen
5	(South Korea) Lee

=== Section 3 ===
First Round
(Lithuania) Kęstutis Navickas	21	21
(Spain) Nicolás Escartín	11	14
(Indonesia) Taufik Hidayat	21	21
13	(Hong Kong) Ng Wei	17	17
(France) Simon Maunoury	21	21
(Iran) Kaveh Mehrabi	17	7
(Guatemala) Pedro Yang	11	9
7	(China) Chen Hong	21	21
(Japan) Shoji Sato	21	21
(Finland) Ville Lång	12	15
(Scotland) Craig Goddard	11	8
10	(Thailand) Boonsak Ponsana	21	21
(India) Anup Sridhar	21	16	13
(Chinese Taipei) Liao Sheng-shiun	19	21	21
Bye
4	(Denmark) Peter Gade

Second Round
(Lithuania) Navickas	21	15	10
(Indonesia) Hidayat	19	21	21
(France) Manoury	17	17
7	(China) Chen	21	21
(Japan) Sato	21	21
10	(Thailand) Ponsana	15	18
(Chinese Taipei) Liao	6	12
4	(Denmark) Gade	21	21

Third Round
(Indonesia) Hidayat	21	18	19
7	(China) Chen	14	21	21
(Japan) Sato	14	13
4	(Denmark) Gade	21	21

Quarter Finals
7	(China) Chen H.
4	(Denmark) Gade

=== Section 4 ===
First Round
(Spain) Carlos Longo	13	17
(Germany) Roman Spitko	21	21
(England) Aamir Ghaffar	18	14
12	(Netherlands) Dicky Palyama	21	21
(Slovakia) Michal Matejka	WO	WO
(Nigeria) Jinkan Ifraimu Bulus
(Republic of Ireland) Scott Evans	10	14
6	(Malaysia) Muhammad Hafiz Hashim	21	21
(Czech Republic) Petr Koukal	21	15	17
(New Zealand) John Moody	14	21	21
(Singapore) Ronald Susilo	10	11
14	(South Korea) Park Sung-hwan	21	21
(Canada) Bobby Milroy	21	21
(Sweden) Magnus Sahlberg	14	14
Bye
2	(China) Lin Dan

Second Round
(Germany) Spitko	19	11
12	(Netherlands) Palyama	21	21
(Slovakia) Matejka	8	10
6	(Malaysia) Hashim	21	21
(New Zealand) Moody	12	13
14	(South Korea) Park	21	21
(Canada) Milroy	16	17
2	(China) Lin	21	21

Third Round
12	(Netherlands) Palyama	21	19	13
6	(Malaysia) Hashim	16	21	21
14	(South Korea) Park	16	12
2	(China) Lin	21	21

Quarter Finals
6	(Malaysia) Hashim
2	(China) Lin

== Finals ==
Quarterfinals
1	(Malaysia) Lee Chong Wei	20	21	18
8	(China) Bao Chunlai	22	12	21
3	(China) Chen Jin	14	21	12
5	(South Korea) Lee Hyun-il	21	19	21
7	(China) Chen Hong	21	15	21
4	(Denmark) Peter Gade	17	21	12
6	(Malaysia) Hafiz Hashim	10	9
2	(China) Lin Dan	21	21

Semifinals
8	(China) Bao Chunlai	21	21
5	(South Korea) Lee Hyun-il	15	19
7	(China) Chen Hong	21	19	14
2	(China) Lin Dan	15	21	21

Finals
8	(China) Bao Chunlai	21	17	12
2	(China) Lin Dan	18	21	21
