= Lin Dan =

Chinese badminton player (born 1983)

Lin Dan 林丹
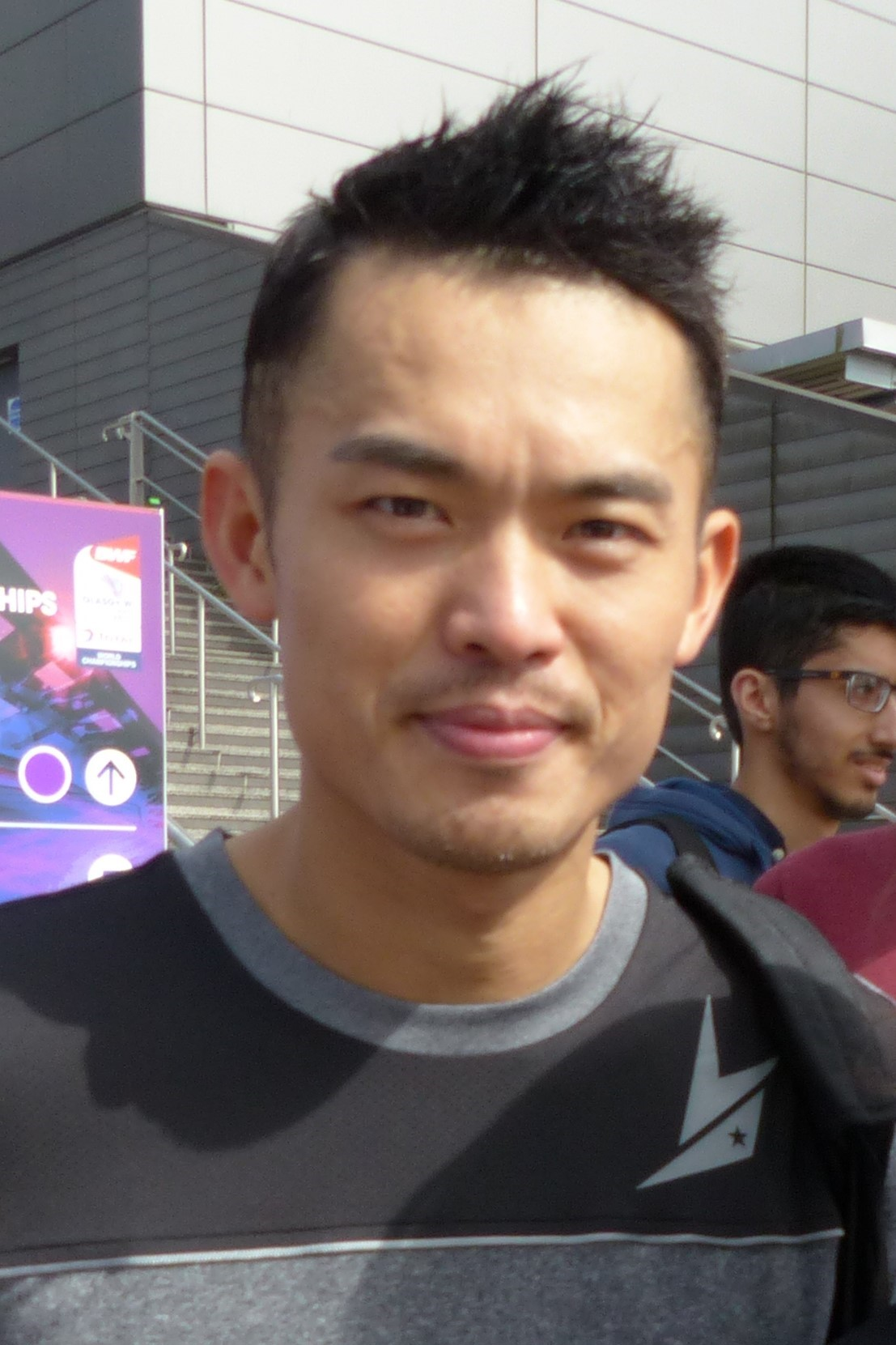
- Lin at the 2017 BWF World Championships

Personal information
- Nickname: Super Dan
- Born: 14 October 1983 (age 43) Longyan, Fujian, China
- Years active: 2000–2020
- Height: 178 cm (5 ft 10 in)
- Weight: 70 kg (154 lb)
- Spouse: Xie Xingfang (m. 2010)

Sport
- Country: China
- Sport: Badminton
- Handedness: Left
- Coached by: Xia Xuanze
- Retired: 4 July 2020

Men's singles
- Career record: 662 wins, 131 losses
- Career title: 66
- Highest ranking: 1 (26 February 2004)
- BWF profile
Medal record
Men's badminton
Representing China
Olympic Games
Gold medal – first place	2008 Beijing	Men's singles
Gold medal – first place	2012 London	Men's singles
World Championships
Gold medal – first place	2006 Madrid	Men's singles
Gold medal – first place	2007 Kuala Lumpur	Men's singles
Gold medal – first place	2009 Hyderabad	Men's singles
Gold medal – first place	2011 London	Men's singles
Gold medal – first place	2013 Guangzhou	Men's singles
Silver medal – second place	2005 Anaheim	Men's singles
Silver medal – second place	2017 Glasgow	Men's singles
World Cup
Gold medal – first place	2005 Yiyang	Men's singles
Gold medal – first place	2006 Yiyang	Men's singles
Sudirman Cup
Gold medal – first place	2005 Beijing	Mixed team
Gold medal – first place	2007 Glasgow	Mixed team
Gold medal – first place	2009 Guangzhou	Mixed team
Gold medal – first place	2011 Qingdao	Mixed team
Gold medal – first place	2015 Dongguan	Mixed team
Silver medal – second place	2017 Gold Coast	Mixed team
Thomas Cup
Gold medal – first place	2004 Jakarta	Men's team
Gold medal – first place	2006 Tokyo	Men's team
Gold medal – first place	2008 Jakarta	Men's team
Gold medal – first place	2010 Kuala Lumpur	Men's team
Gold medal – first place	2012 Wuhan	Men's team
Gold medal – first place	2018 Bangkok	Men's team
Bronze medal – third place	2002 Guangzhou	Men's team
Bronze medal – third place	2014 New Delhi	Men's team
Asian Games
Gold medal – first place	2006 Doha	Men's team
Gold medal – first place	2010 Guangzhou	Men's singles
Gold medal – first place	2010 Guangzhou	Men's team
Gold medal – first place	2014 Incheon	Men's singles
Gold medal – first place	2018 Jakarta-Palembang	Men's team
Silver medal – second place	2006 Doha	Men's singles
Silver medal – second place	2014 Incheon	Men's team
Bronze medal – third place	2002 Busan	Men's team
Asian Championships
Gold medal – first place	2010 New Delhi	Men's singles
Gold medal – first place	2011 Chengdu	Men's singles
Gold medal – first place	2014 Gimcheon	Men's singles
Gold medal – first place	2015 Wuhan	Men's singles
Silver medal – second place	2001 Manila	Men's singles
Silver medal – second place	2017 Wuhan	Men's singles
Bronze medal – third place	2008 Johor Bahru	Men's singles
Bronze medal – third place	2012 Qingdao	Men's singles
Bronze medal – third place	2016 Wuhan	Men's singles
East Asian Games
Gold medal – first place	2009 Hong Kong	Men's team
Silver medal – second place	2009 Hong Kong	Men's singles
World Junior Championships
Gold medal – first place	2000 Guangzhou	Mixed team
Bronze medal – third place	2000 Guangzhou	Boys' singles
Asian Junior Championships
Gold medal – first place	2000 Kyoto	Boys' singles
Gold medal – first place	2000 Kyoto	Boys' team
Bronze medal – third place	1999 Yangon	Boys' doubles

- Updated on 21 November 2024

Lin Dan
- Simplified Chinese: 林丹
- Traditional Chinese: 林丹
Transcriptions
Standard Mandarin
- Hanyu Pinyin: Lín Dān
- IPA: [lǐn tán]

Lin Dan (Chinese: 林丹; born 14 October 1983) is a Chinese former professional badminton player. He is a two-time Olympic gold medallist, five-time World Championships gold medalist, two-time World Cup champion, two-time Asian Games gold medalist, four-time Asian Champion, as well as a six-time All England champion. He led China to victory 5 times at the Sudirman Cup, 6 times at the Thomas Cup, and 3 times at the Asian Games men's team event.

Widely regarded as the greatest badminton player of all time, by the age of 28 Lin had completed the "Super Grand Slam", having won the full set of all nine major titles in the badminton world of his time: Olympic Games, World Championships, World Cup, Thomas Cup, Sudirman Cup, Year-end Finals, Asian Games, and Asian Championships, becoming the third player to achieve this feat after Ge Fei and Gu Jun, and the only male player to ever achieve this feat. Of the 9 major events, he had won at least 2 of each events except the Year-end Finals where he won once in his only time participating in that event. He also became the first men's singles player to retain the Olympic gold medal by winning in 2008 and successfully defending his title in 2012.

Lin was dubbed "Super Dan" by opponent Peter Gade after winning the 2004 All England Open final, and the nickname has since been widely used by his fans as well as the media to refer to him, in recognition of his achievements. He was inducted to BWF Badminton Hall of Fame on 26 May 2023.

== Early life ==
Lin was born in Fujian, China. At a young age, Lin was encouraged to learn to play the piano by his parents, and to be a pianist. However, he chose to play badminton instead. Having started his training at the age of five, he was scouted by the People's Liberation Army Sports Team after winning the National Junior Championships aged twelve, and was enlisted into the Chinese National Badminton Team in 2001, when he was 18.

== Career ==
=== Junior events ===
Lin emerged as a winner in the 2000 Asian Junior Championships in both the team and the singles events. He was also a member of the winning Chinese team and a boys' singles semi-finalist in the 2000 World Junior Championships.

=== 2001–2003: Senior debut and Four tour titles ===
2001 marked the start of then 18-year-old Lin's professional career. In his first final, at the Asian Championships, he was thrashed by compatriot Xia Xuanze. He then entered his first final in the IBF Grand Prix event at the Denmark Open, losing to Bao Chunlai.

In 2002, Lin took his first title at the Korea Open. He was a member of China's 2002 Thomas Cup squad which defeated Sweden (5–0), Denmark (3–2), and South Korea (4–1) to reach the semi-finals. However, Lin didn't play in the semi-final tie against Malaysia, which saw China's team tumble to a 1–3 defeat. Lin participated in another four tournaments without coming close to victory. He was knocked out in the first round of the Singapore, and Indonesia Opens, second round of the Denmark Open, and third round of the China Open. In October, Lin was defeated in the semi-finals of the Asian Games team competition which ended China's hope of a team gold medal.

Lin started the 2003 season with a third round defeat in the All England Open. He reached a final later in the year at the Japan Open but was beaten by his compatriot Xia Xuanze once again. Lin then made his debut in the World Championships in Birmingham, England. He breezed past Per-Henrik Croona and Przemysław Wacha in the first two rounds, but was beaten by Xia again in his third round match. After the world meet, he was eliminated in the semi-finals of the Singapore Open, third round of the Indonesia Open, and second round of the Malaysia Open. However, Lin ended the season strongly by capturing the Denmark, Hong Kong, and China Opens, and finishing runner-up at the German Open.

=== 2004: World #1, All England and Thomas Cup champions ===
Lin had a good start to 2004, earning the BWF's number one world ranking for the first time in February. He helped China win the qualifying round of Thomas Cup and then captured the Swiss Open. He won his first ever All England Open title by beating Peter Gade in the final. He reached the semi-final of the Japan Open before going off to Jakarta, Indonesia in May for the Thomas Cup campaign.

In Thomas Cup, Lin helped China to an excellent start in which they thrashed United States and defending champion Indonesia 5–0 respectively to enter the quarter-finals. Lin then defeated Shoji Sato and Lee Hyun-il in quarter and semi-finals ties against Japan and South Korea respectively, each ending in 3–0 wins for China. In the final, he beat Peter Gade in straight games to give China the lead before the Chinese team eventually won three matches to one. China thus took the crown, ending a 14 years drought in the tournament.

Lin suffered setbacks later in the 2004 season when he was ousted in the quarter-finals of the Malaysia Open, and was reported to have a leg injury in mid-July, prior to the Olympic Games. Lin "crashed" in his first Olympic Games when, as the first seed, he was ousted early by Singapore's Ronald Susilo, who claimed Lin was "too eager to win". However, Lin bounced back with three titles at the Denmark, German, and China Opens, and ended the season as a semi-finalist at the Indonesia Open.

=== 2005: Sudirman and World Cup success ===
Lin retained his number one world ranking during 2005, winning his second German and Hong Kong Open titles, as well as the Japan Open, China Masters, and World Cup tournaments. He also helped China recapture the Sudirman Cup (combined men's and women's team championship) when it shut-out both defending champion South Korea in the semi-finals and Indonesia in the final.

Lin failed to retain his All England title, losing a three set final to teammate Chen Hong, and he was beaten in the final of the Malaysia Open by another rising star, Lee Chong Wei. In his bid to capture his first BWF World title at Anaheim California, he beat Kennevic Asuncion, Shoji Sato, Lee Hyun-il, and Peter Gade in succession to reach the final. There he was decisively beaten by a peak-form Taufik Hidayat. Lin was also eliminated in the semi-finals of the Singapore Open and the quarter-finals of the China Open.

=== 2006: World Champion, Second All England and Thomas Cup triumph ===
Lin started the season by reaching the semi-finals of the German Open, and had a same result in China Masters and China Open. He failed to win the Malaysia Open in June, which saw his opponent Lee Chong Wei produce a superb display to save the title after being 13–20 down in the deciding game, and also lost to Taufik Hidayat in Asian Games final.

However, he won six individual titles in the season. He recaptured the All England Open, and won the Chinese Taipei, Macau, Hong Kong, and Japan Opens. Most significantly, in Madrid, Spain that September he won his first world title after beating his compatriot Bao Chunlai in the final.

In May, Lin and his teammates had extended China's Thomas Cup reign by shutting out Denmark 3–0 for a second consecutive title. In October, he won his second World Cup men's singles title.

=== 2007: Consecutive World title, Third All England and Second Sudirman Cup ===
Lin Dan entered 2007 with a loss to South Korea's Park Sung-hwan in the round of 16 at the Malaysia Open. A week later, he captured the Korea Open by defeating Chinese teammate Chen Jin in the final. He went on to win the German Open and then the All England championships again, crushing compatriot Chen Yu 21–13, 21–12. In June, Lin Dan was part of the Chinese Sudirman Cup team that retained the cup after beating Indonesia 3–0 in the final at Glasgow, Scotland. Later in the season Lin defeated Wong Choong Hann of Malaysia and became the China Masters champion for 2007. In August, Lin extended his reign as the World Champion when he beat Indonesia's Sony Dwi Kuncoro 21–11, 22–20 in the final of the tournament held in Kuala Lumpur, Malaysia. Lin Dan thus became the first man since Yang Yang to win back to back World Championships. He then won his third Denmark Open title, and ended the year by claiming his fourth Hong Kong Open title.

=== 2008: Olympic gold, Third Thomas Cup and Controversies ===
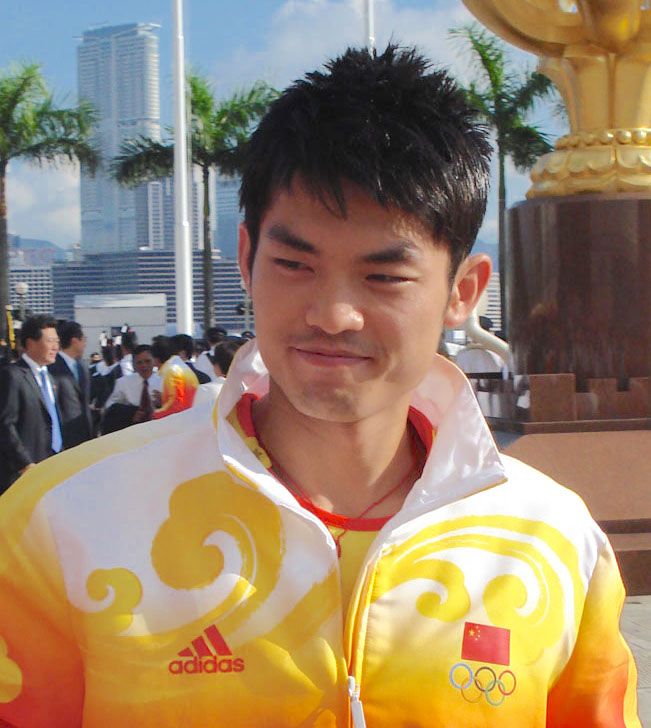
Lin at Golden Bauhinia Square, Hong Kong, 2008

Lin started the season with a defeat in the final of the Korea Open to Lee Hyun-il. It was a match filled with controversy as Lin had a scuffle with South Korea's coach Li Mao after a line call dispute. Lin refused to apologise and received no punishment from Badminton World Federation (BWF) after its probe of the altercation. In March, he suffered another defeat to his compatriot Chen Jin in the final of the All England Open, which was followed by press accusations that Lin "gave" the match to Chen in order to increase Chen's ranking points for Olympic qualification (which placed stringent limits on the number of participants from any one country). In the following week, Lin won his first Swiss Open. At the Asian Championships, Lin was again accused of helping his compatriot when his loss to Chen Jin in the semi-finals ensured Chen's qualification for the Olympic Games.

On 10 April 2008, Lin was involved in yet another controversy when he struck coach Ji Xinpeng in front of his teammates and the media during an intra-squad tournament prior to the Thomas Cup. The incident was allegedly triggered by his unhappiness with Ji's arrangement of the starting line-up for the tournament. Despite the episode, in May Lin proceeded to win each match he played in the Thomas Cup until China's semi-finals clash with Malaysia when he lost rather tamely to Lee Chong Wei. However, China still managed to reach the final by edging Malaysia 3–2, then retained the cup against South Korea with Lin's win at first singles helping China to a 3–1 victory.

Lin won the Thailand Open, his last tournament before the 2008 Olympic Games.

In the Beijing Olympic Games, he beat Hong Kong's Ng Wei in the first round, Park Sung-hwan in the second round, and Peter Gade in the quarter-finals. He then beat his teammate Chen Jin in straight sets to set up a "dream" final against Lee Chong Wei. However, the final was a one-sided match as Lin beat Lee 21–12, 21–8, and became the first men's singles player to win the Olympic gold as a first seed.

Not back in action until the China Open in November, Lin again beat Lee in the final, before losing to Chen Jin once again in the Hong Kong Open. Lin was eligible to participate in the lucrative Masters Finals in December, but due to the withdrawal of the whole Chinese contingent (citing weariness and injuries), he didn't take part in the tournament.

=== 2009: Third World and Sudirman Cup titles, Fourth All England ===
In March, at his first tournament appearance of 2009, Lin won his fourth All England title without dropping a game, defeating Lee Chong Wei in the final. After this dominant performance, he lost to Lee in the final of Swiss Open a week later.

In May, Lin participated in the Sudirman Cup helping China to consecutive 5–0 victories over England, Japan, and Indonesia. In the semi-finals against Malaysia Lin defeated Lee Chong Wei in straight games as China advanced to the final against South Korea with another shutout. In the last round the same form held true as Lin beat Park Sung-hwan thus helping China to secure the Cup for the third time in a row, and each time without dropping a match in the series.

During the rest of 2009, Lin dropped only two matches; in June in the quarter-finals of the Indonesia Open, and, perhaps most surprisingly, in the finals of December's East Asian Games in Hong Kong to South Korea's little known Choi Ho-jin. Aside from those upsets, Lin dominated. In August in Hyderabad he became the first player to win the World Championships three times by beating compatriot Chen Jin in the final. Later Lin would go on to win his fourth China Masters title and first French Open title. He ended his tournament winning streak in November with the China Open title, before the late-year upset loss in the East Asian Games in Hong Kong.

=== 2010: Asian Games gold, Fourth Thomas Cup and Asian champion ===
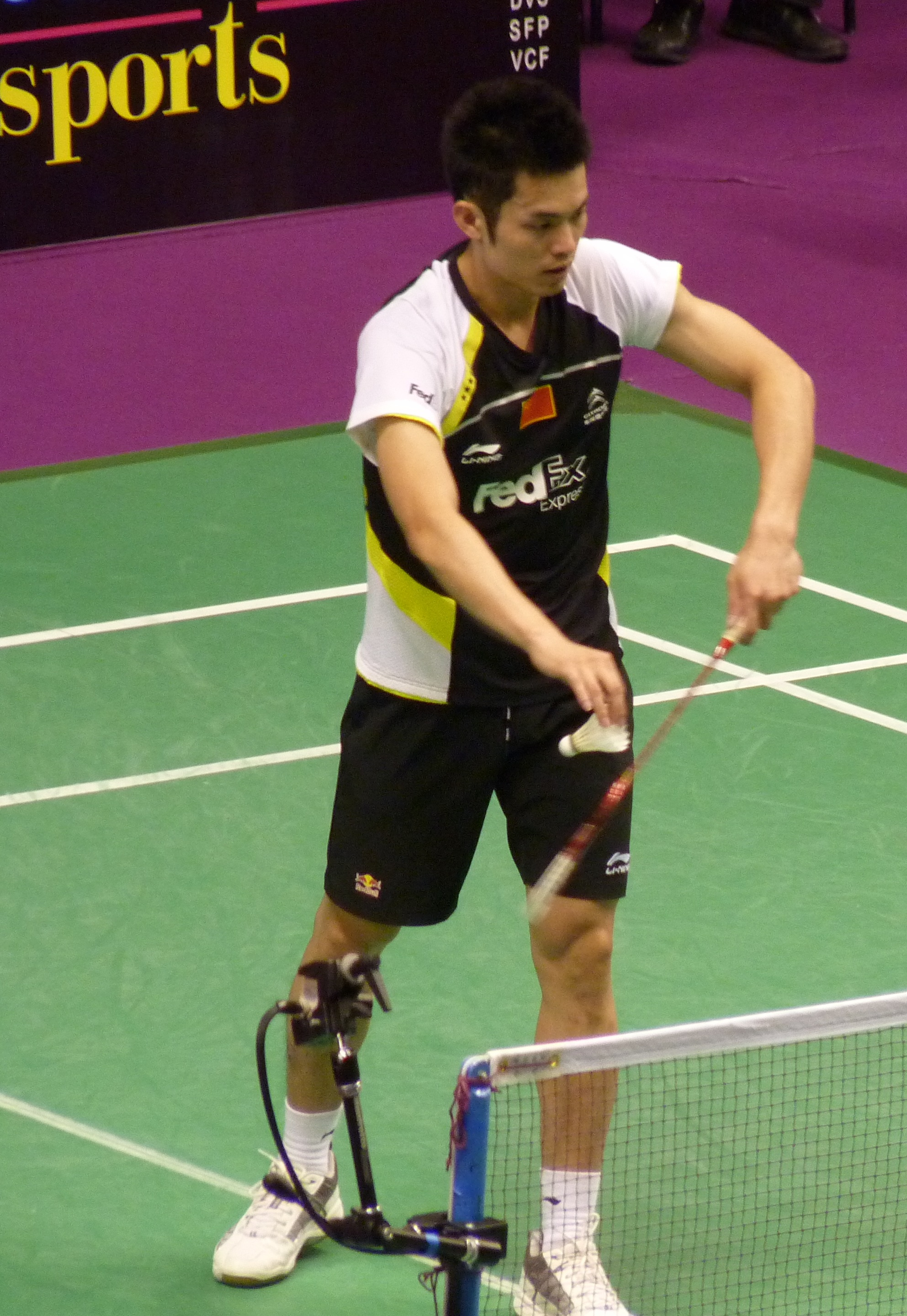
Lin at the 2010 BWF World Championships

After starting the season disappointingly with quarterfinal losses at both the All England and Swiss Opens, Lin won his first title of the year at the Badminton Asia Championships in New Delhi, which also marked his first victory at this annual event.

Taking part in his fifth Thomas Cup campaign for China in May, Lin won a pair of hard-fought encounters with South Korea's Park Sung-hwan in the group ties and the quarter-finals respectively. In the semi-finals, he handily defeated Lee Chong Wei in contributing to China's 3–0 victory over Malaysia and a berth in the final against long time rival Indonesia. Here, Lin led off with a comfortable victory over familiar opponent Taufik Hidayat, as China went on to capture its eighth Men's World Team title; its fourth consecutively.

After the Thomas Cup triumph, Lin played in the World Championships in Paris, France. He won his opening match and then beat Henri Hurskainen and Bao Chunlai in the second and third rounds respectively before being upset by Park Sung-hwan in the quarter-finals. That day also saw his archrival Lee Chong Wei exit from the tournament which was eventually won by Lin's compatriot Chen Jin. Lin then bounced back to win the China Masters, but lost the final of the Japan Open to Lee Chong Wei the following week, and conceded walkovers in the quarter-finals of both the China Open, and Hong Kong Open late in the year.

However, Lin managed to win his first ever Asian Games gold medal in November by beating Lee Chong Wei in final, thus, at 27, becoming the first player to win all of the present major titles available to Asian men in badminton, both individual and national team. Lin was voted the most valuable player (MVP) at the games' closing ceremony.

=== 2011: Fourth World and Sudirman Cup success, Second Asian and First Super Series Masters Finals titles ===
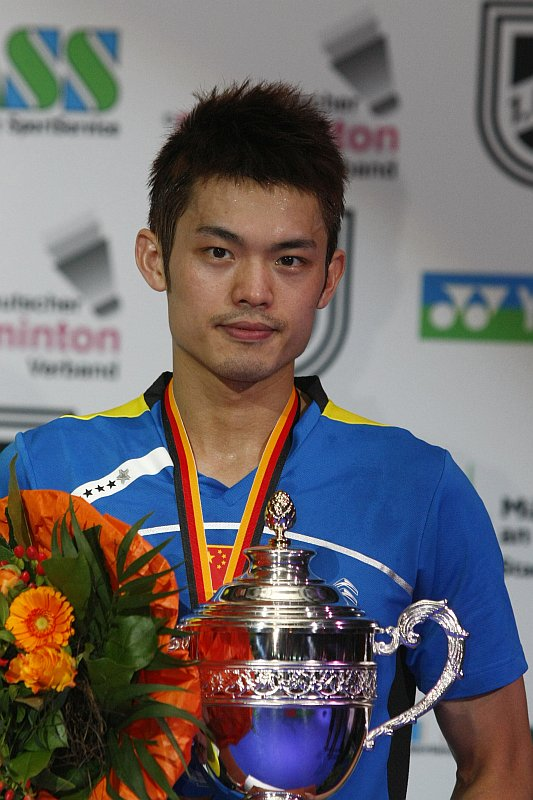
Lin at the 2011 German Open

Lin began the year with a withdrawal in the Malaysia Open's quarter-finals, which marked his third consecutive withdrawal since late 2010. This action brought some criticism, particularly by well known fellow competitor Taufik Hidayat. The very next week Lin sprang back to win the first ever million dollar badminton tournament, Korea Open by beating Lee Chong Wei in the final. He next won the German Open, beating his compatriot and reigning world champion Chen Jin in the final.

At the prestigious All England Championships in March his hopes for a fifth title were put on hold when he was defeated by Lee Chong Wei in the final. However, in April he won his second Asian Championships on a day which saw China sweep all five titles and in May he helped China to a fourth consecutive Sudirman Cup title by defeating Denmark 3–0 in the final. In June, Lin's withdrawal from the Singapore Open final due to gastric flu drew jeers from fans in the stadium. Just few days later, he was upset by Sho Sasaki in the second round of Indonesia Open.

Healthy again in August, Lin won his fourth World Championship title by beating familiar rivals Peter Gade in the semi-finals and Lee Chong Wei in a very tight three game final at Wembley Arena, a venue which would host the badminton competition for 2012 Summer Olympics.

The rather up and down season for Lin continued with the China Masters in September where he was ousted in the semi-finals, and at the Japan Open where he withdrew from the semifinals. This was followed up by a shock exit in the second round of the Denmark Open to Hong Kong player Wong Wing Ki, and another withdrawal during the semifinals of French Open despite leading in the match. He told officials that he was suffering from paronychia (an infection below the fingernail). This was his sixth retirement of the season and many in the media imputed that this was part of a strategy to improve the rankings of other Chinese singles players to allow the maximum number to qualify for the 2012 Olympics. Both Lin and Chinese coach Li Yongbo denied this, citing, instead, the heavy tournament schedule that BWF required of top players, and Lin's need to be ready for the biggest events such as the Olympics. In any case, Lin's slump did not last long. He ended the year by winning three straight events, His fifth Hong Kong Open, the China Open, and his first Super Series Masters Finals title.

=== 2012: Second Olympic gold, Fifth All England and Thomas Cup ===
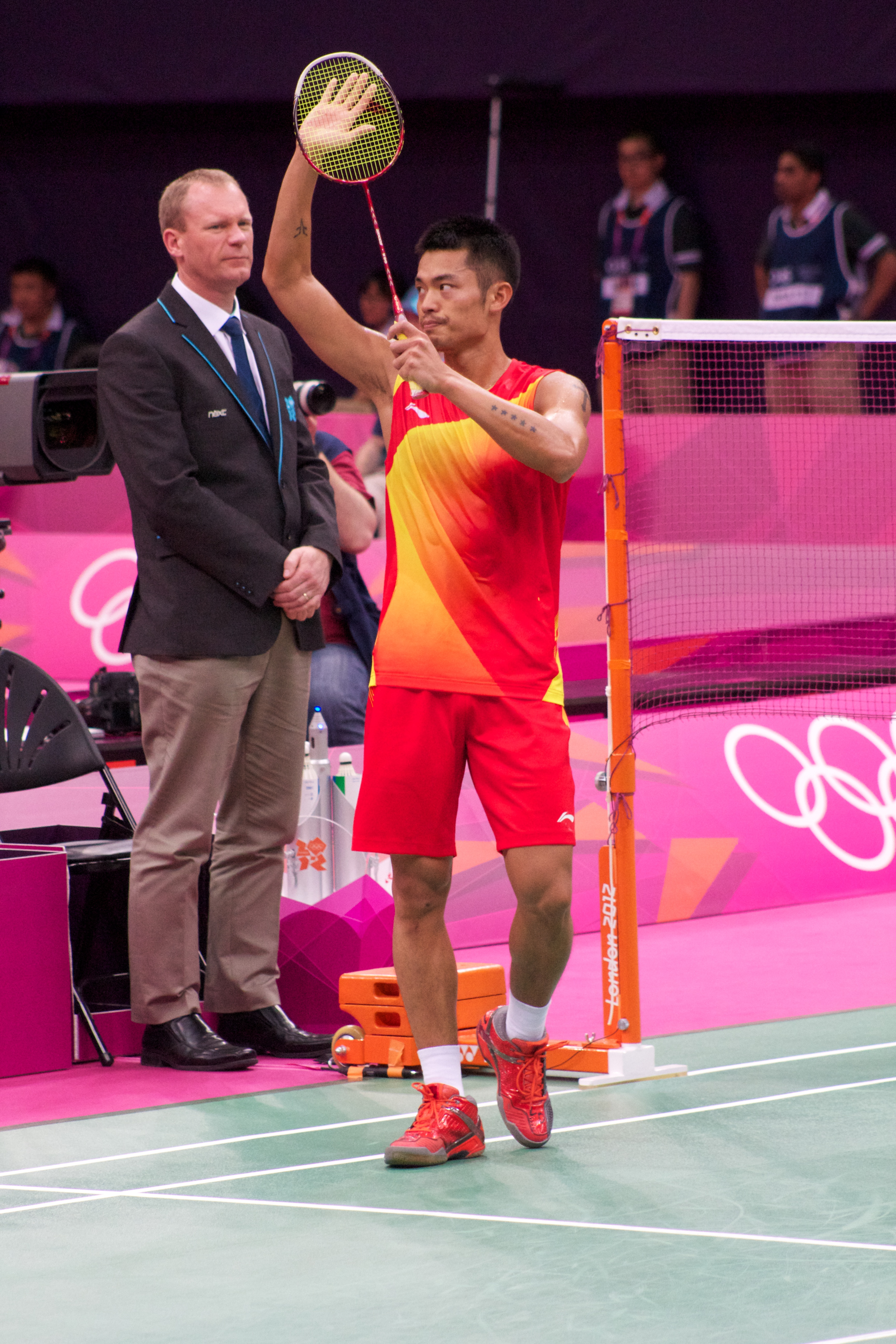
Lin at the 2012 Summer Olympics

Lin started the year by losing to Lee Chong Wei in the final of the Korea Open, and then losing in the second round of the Malaysia Open to Denmark's Jan O. Jorgensen. In early March, he took his first title of the season by winning his fifth German Open. The very next week, he won his fifth All England Open title as rival Lee Chong Wei was forced to retire in discomfort early in the second game of the final. In April, Lin was again the subject of some controversy when he withdrew from the semifinals of the Asian Championships, a move that was openly seen as a ploy to secure an Olympic berth for his compatriot Chen Jin.

In Wuhan, China in May, Lin Dan and his teammates won all of their individual matches in each tie they played to win their fifth consecutive Thomas Cup (remarkably China's women also went entirely undefeated to regain the Uber Cup from South Korea). With only a week between Thomas Cup and the Thailand Open in early June, a fatigued Lin lost in the semi-finals to Indonesia's highly capable Sony Dwi Kuncoro.

At the 2012 Summer Olympics in London, Lin routinely beat Ireland's Scott Evans to qualify for the main draw of sixteen players where he started by trouncing fading star Taufik Hidayat. In the quarter-finals, however, Japan's hard-fighting Sho Sasaki put Lin to the test before yielding 16–21 in the third game. Lin then handily beat South Korean veteran Lee Hyun-il in the semi-finals to set up yet another meeting with his chief rival Lee Chong Wei. Unlike the 2008 Olympic finals, this one was no cakewalk for Lin. He lost the first game to Lee but came back strongly to take the second. The rubber game was a thriller which saw Lin claw back from slight deficits most of the way to finally prevail 21–19. An ecstatic Lin thus became the first men's singles player to retain the Olympic title, while Lee, now almost 30, was once again foiled at one of the sport's two biggest events (aside from the Thomas and Uber Cups), the Olympics and the World Championships.

=== 2013: Fifth World title ===
After his 2012 Olympic victory Lin did not make another tournament appearance until the Asian Championships, in April where, citing injury, he withdrew from the quarter-finals. Amid some speculation that he was planning to retire, Lin was granted a special wild card entry into the World Championships in Guangzhou, as, despite his great achievements, his recent inactivity had caused his world ranking to fall below that of other Chinese players who would then normally fill the maximum quota of three entrants that any one country was allowed. Without appearing in any tournament between the Badminton Asia Championships in April and the World Championships in August, Lin was able to convert this wildcard entry into his fifth world title. He won all of his matches in straight games until the final where, yet again, hard-luck Lee Chong Wei could not quite catch him in the third game rubber, and was forced to submit with a painful cramp down 17–20.

=== 2014: Second Asian gold and Third Asian title ===
After seven month tournament absence, Lin, down to 104th in the official world rankings, returned in April and took titles in the China Masters, and the Asian Championships in quick succession. Lin was part of China's Thomas Cup team which defended its title in May, but because of his deflated ranking could only play at third singles. Consequently, when China met a talented and highly motivated Japanese team in the semi-finals at New Delhi, Lin could only watch helplessly as Japan took the first two singles and a doubles to break China's ten year streak of men's world team titles. Beyond this disappointment, the BWF would not grant Lin a wild card entry into the 2014 World Championships, as they did in 2013. Thus Lin could not defend his title which was won by Chinese teammate Chen Long who defeated the unlucky Lee Chong Wei in a close two game final.

In June, Lin lost in the quarter-finals of Japan Open. Shortly afterwards, he won the Australian Open, his first Superseries title since the 2012 All England Open, and then won the Grand Prix title in the Chinese Taipei Open. In September, he successfully defended his men's singles title in the Incheon Asian Games and was also a part of the men's team winning the silver medal. In November, Lin lost in the final of the China Open to Srikanth Kidambi from India.

=== 2015: Fourth Asian title and Fifth Sudirman Cup ===
Lin won the men's singles title at the Asian Championships in China, defending his title won the previous year in South Korea. He defeated compatriot Tian Houwei 21–19, 21–8 in a match that lasted 50 minutes in the central city of Wuhan. Lin Dan contributed to China winning its 10th Sudirman Cup by defeating Japan's Takuma Ueda 21–15, 21–13 in the final for his team's third and decisive point. His return to the World Championships in August, however, was not particularly auspicious as he was routinely eliminated by Denmark's Jan Ø. Jørgensen in the quarter-finals, as Lin's compatriot Chen Long again prevailed over Lee Chong Wei in the finals. Recovering from this disappointment, in September, Lin won his only Superseries title of the year at the Japan Open, making a remarkable comeback after trailing 3–11 in the deciding game of the final against Denmark's young star Viktor Axelsen. He then participated in the Rio Olympics test tournament the Brasil Open in the end of the year, won the title after beating Pablo Abián in the final.

=== 2016: Sixth All England title ===
In March, Lin defeated Taiwan's Chou Tien-Chen in three hard games to clinch his seventh men's singles title at the German Open. A week after this win, Lin regained his All England title in Birmingham, giving him his 6th victory at this prestigious event. In impressive form, he beat compatriot Tian Houwei 21–9, 21–10 in the final.

In April, Lin Dan beat world No. 1 Chen Long in straight games to lift his sixth China Masters crown in Jiangsu, China. Here Lin showed his competitive mettle by coming from 11 to 16 behind in the second game to clinch the match 23–21. In June, however, he was stunned in second round of Indonesia Open by eighteen year old Jonatan Christie.

At the 2016 Rio Summer Olympics, Lin sailed through his group round robin to qualify for the main draw. In the quarter-finals he was tested by India's Srikanth Kidambi, but pulled through 21–18 in the third game. This set up a sem-ifinals confrontation with long-time rival Lee Chong Wei which drew great fan interest as the players, both in their thirties, were assumed to be near retirement. In another epic match Lee was finally able to reverse past Olympic and World Championship losses to Lin and prevailed, 15–21, 21–11, 22–20. But Lee's quest for Olympic gold after two silver medals ended with a disappointing finale, as he was beaten in two close games by Lin's compatriot Chen Long. In the bronze medal match, Lin played Denmark's Viktor Axelsen. After taking the first set 21–15, the two-time Olympic champion lost the next two and the match with a scoreline of 21–15, 10–21, 17–21. After the Rio Olympics, he skipped all international tournaments for the remainder of the year.

=== 2017: First Malaysia Open title ===
In March, at the prestigious All England Championships Lin defeated Viktor Axelson in the quarter-finals but was eliminated in the semi-finals by his countryman Shi Yuqi, more than twelve years Lin's Junior. However, he bounced back to win the Swiss Open by beating Shi Yuqi in the finals. In April, he won the Malaysia Open for the first time by defeating Lee Chong Wei, who had virtually owned this title for more than a decade. In the China Masters, he lost in the semi-finals to Qiao Bin, and in the Asian Championships, where he recorded a sem-ifinals win over Lee Chong Wei, he took a silver medal after losing to Chen Long in the final. Lin was beaten in the German and Indonesian Opens respectively in round of 16. He lost to Chen Long in the Australian Open quarter-finals.

At the World Championships in Glasgow, Scotland, at age 33, Lin managed to reach a record seventh men's singles final by beating Hong Kong's Wong Wing Ki, 21–17, 21–18 in the quarter-finals and beating Korea's Son Wan-ho, 21–17, 21–14 in the semi-finals. But in the finals, he was beaten in straight sets by his ten years younger opponent, Viktor Axelsen of Denmark, 22–20, 21–16.

=== 2018: Sixth Thomas Cup ===
In March, the 34-year-old Lin tied Rudy Hartono's record of reaching ten All England men's singles finals, but was foiled in his try for a seventh title by his much younger compatriot, Shi Yuqi in three exhausting games, 19–21, 21–16, 9–21. In May, he won the New Zealand Open by beating talented Indonesian youngster Jonatan Christie in two close games, 21–14, 21–19. Later that month, Lin was a member of the Chinese team which regained the Thomas Cup after four years of absence, though his team was never extended to a deciding 5th match which would have required his services in the third singles position.

=== 2019: Second Malaysia Open title ===
In his first tournament of 2019, Lin reached the final of the Thailand Masters, where he lost to the up-and-coming Loh Kean Yew in two tightly contested games, 19–21, 18–21. In April, at the age of 35, he won his second Malaysia Open title, beating higher ranked compatriot Shi Yuqi, and Chen Long, in the semi-finals and finals respectively. However, he withdrew from the Singapore Open during the first round against Viktor Axelsen, citing a "thigh injury", but only after being visibly upset by early line calls. In May, he lost in the semi-finals of the New Zealand Open to Ng Ka Long in two straight games. In November, he lost in the final of the Korea Masters to Kanta Tsuneyama in another straight games defeat.

=== 2020: Pandemic-Shortened Season ===
Lin began the 2020 season poorly. In January he was eliminated in the first round of the Malaysia Masters by Jan Ø. Jørgensen in two games, 19–21, 18–21. The following week, he participated in the Indonesia Masters and was defeated in the first round again, this time by Viktor Axelsen, who beat him in two relatively easy games, 12–21, 14–21. Lin then followed up with yet another first round exit at the Thailand Masters where he lost to Ng Ka Long. At the All England Open held in March, he reached the second round but was defeated by compatriot Chen Long. This turned out to be his last tournament as the rest of the world tour was cancelled due to the COVID-19 pandemic outbreak.

== Retirement ==
On 4 July 2020, Lin announced his retirement, saying "At 37, pain and injuries no longer allow me to fight with my teammates. I have gratitude, a heavy heart and unwillingness." After his retirement, he joined Instagram to stay connected with his fans all over the world.

== Rivalry with Lee Chong Wei ==
The Lee–Lin rivalry was a rivalry between two professional badminton players, Lee Chong Wei and Lin Dan whose careers were almost exactly contemporaneous. The rivalry is often considered the greatest in the history of badminton even though Lin had the decided edge. Of their 40 meetings, Lin won the head-to-head by 28–12 but Lee Chong Wei was ranked World number one throughout both their careers consecutively for almost 10 years.

== Personal life ==
Lin has been in a relationship with Xie Xingfang, herself a former world champion, since 2003. They were quietly engaged on 13 December 2010 in Haizhu, Guangzhou. Xie initially denied but later acknowledged romantic involvement with Lin, who reacted angrily at the public exposure of their relationship, citing reasons of personal privacy. The two were married on 23 September 2012 and the wedding ceremony was held at the Beijing University of Technology.

Lin had five tattoos visible during the 2012 Summer Olympics. His upper left arm has a Christian cross, his lower left arm has five stars, his right upper arm reads "until the end of world", a double "F" lettering on his lower right arm, and his initials "LD" are tattooed on the back of his neck. These tattoos have been the subject of controversy due to his military and religious status.

On 17 October 2012, he became the first active Chinese badminton player to accept a master's degree, which was presented at Huaqiao University. His autobiography, Until the End of the World, was published after he successfully defended his Olympic title at the London 2012 Olympics.

He and his wife Xie Xingfang had their first child "Xiao Yu" (Little feather) on 5 November 2016. On 17 November 2016, he admitted to an affair and apologised on Weibo. Social media users had purportedly identified the woman as actress and model Zhao Yaqi.

== Honours and awards ==
Lin won the Eddie Choong Player of the Year award for two consecutive years in 2006 and 2007. He also secured the BWF Best Male Player of the Year in 2008. Lin was voted Most Valuable Player (MVP) during the 2010 Asian Games in Guangzhou, China.

On 16 January 2011, he was named China's best male athlete for 2010 in China Central Television's Sports Personality of the Year poll for his clean sweep in major badminton titles.

On 26 May 2023, Lin was inducted into the BWF's Hall of Fame along with long-time rival, Lee Chong Wei of Malaysia.

== Social media ==
Weibo is the main social media platform which Lin is using to post and update his latest status as well as communicate with his fans or friends. Lin uses his name '林丹' as the name of the account. In February 2018, the latest number of his followers on Weibo has achieved 3.7 million. Additionally, Lin's fan group has set an exclusive account called '林丹全国球迷会' on Weibo to update Lin's latest status, post his pictures and results of matches.

== Achievements ==
=== Olympic Games ===
Men's singles
Year	Venue	Opponent	Score	Result	Ref.
2008	Beijing University of Technology Gymnasium, Beijing, China	(Malaysia) Lee Chong Wei	21–12, 21–8	Gold	
2012	Wembley Arena, London, United Kingdom	(Malaysia) Lee Chong Wei	15–21, 21–10, 21–19	Gold	

=== World Championships ===
Men's singles
Year	Venue	Opponent	Score	Result	Ref.
2005	Arrowhead Pond, Anaheim, United States	(Indonesia) Taufik Hidayat	3–15, 7–15	Silver	
2006	Palacio de Deportes de la Comunidad, Madrid, Spain	(China) Bao Chunlai	18–21, 21–17, 21–12	Gold	
2007	Putra Indoor Stadium, Kuala Lumpur, Malaysia	(Indonesia) Sony Dwi Kuncoro	21–11, 22–20	Gold	
2009	Gachibowli Indoor Stadium, Hyderabad, India	(China) Chen Jin	21–18, 21–16	Gold	
2011	Wembley Arena, London, England	(Malaysia) Lee Chong Wei	20–22, 21–14, 23–21	Gold	
2013	Tianhe Sports Center, Guangzhou, China	(Malaysia) Lee Chong Wei	16–21, 21–13, 20–17^{r}	Gold	
2017	Emirates Arena, Glasgow, Scotland	(Denmark) Viktor Axelsen	20–22, 16–21	Silver	

=== World Cup ===
Men's singles
Year	Venue	Opponent	Score	Result	Ref.
2005	Olympic Park, Yiyang, China	(Thailand) Boonsak Ponsana	21–14, 21–11	Gold	
2006	Olympic Park, Yiyang, China	(China) Chen Yu	21–19, 19–21, 21–17	Gold	

=== Asian Games ===
Men's singles
Year	Venue	Opponent	Score	Result	Ref.
2006	Aspire Hall 3, Doha, Qatar	(Indonesia) Taufik Hidayat	15–21, 20–22	Silver	
2010	Tianhe Gymnasium, Guangzhou, China	(Malaysia) Lee Chong Wei	21–13, 15–21, 21–10	Gold	
2014	Gyeyang Gymnasium, Incheon, South Korea	(China) Chen Long	12–21, 21–16, 21–16	Gold	

=== Asian Championships ===
Men's singles
Year	Venue	Opponent	Score	Result	Ref.
2001	PhilSports Arena, Manila, Philippines	(China) Xia Xuanze	10–15, 9–15	Silver	
2008	Bandaraya Stadium, Johor Bahru, Malaysia	(China) Chen Jin	13–21, 14–21	Bronze	
2010	Siri Fort Indoor Stadium, New Delhi, India	(China) Wang Zhengming	21–17, 21–15	Gold	
2011	Sichuan Gymnasium, Chengdu, China	(China) Bao Chunlai	21–19, 21–13	Gold	
2014	Gimcheon Indoor Stadium, Gimcheon, South Korea	(Japan) Sho Sasaki	14–21, 21–9, 21–15	Gold	
2015	Wuhan Sports Center Gymnasium, Wuhan, China	(China) Tian Houwei	21–19, 21–8	Gold	
2016	Wuhan Sports Center Gymnasium, Wuhan, China	(Malaysia) Lee Chong Wei	20–22, 21–15, 4–21	Bronze	
2017	Wuhan Sports Center Gymnasium, Wuhan, China	(China) Chen Long	23–21, 11–21, 10–21	Silver	

=== East Asian Games ===
Men's singles
Year	Venue	Opponent	Score	Result	Ref.
2009	Queen Elizabeth Stadium, Hong Kong	(South Korea) Choi Ho-jin	19–21, 18–21	Silver	

=== World Junior Championships ===
Boys' singles
Year	Venue	Opponent	Score	Result	Ref.
2000	Tianhe Gymnasium, Guangzhou, China	(China) Bao Chunlai	4–7, 2–7, 7–0, 7–0, 1–7	Bronze	

=== Asian Junior Championships ===
Boys' singles
Year	Venue	Opponent	Score	Result	Ref.
2000	Nishiyama Park Gymnasium, Kyoto, Japan	(Indonesia) Sony Dwi Kuncoro	15–12, 15–5	Gold	

Boys' doubles
Year	Venue	Partner	Opponent	Score	Result	Ref.
1999	National Indoor Stadium – 1, Yangon, Myanmar	(China) Zheng Bo	(China) Chen Yu (China) Sang Yang	15–10, 3–15, 10–15	Bronze	

=== BWF World Tour (2 titles, 3 runners-up) ===
The BWF World Tour, which was announced on 19 March 2017 and implemented in 2018, is a series of elite badminton tournaments sanctioned by the Badminton World Federation (BWF). The BWF World Tours are divided into levels of World Tour Finals, Super 1000, Super 750, Super 500, Super 300 (part of the HSBC World Tour), and the BWF Tour Super 100.

Men's singles
Year	Tournament	Level	Opponent	Score	Result	Ref.
2018	All England Open	Super 1000	(China) Shi Yuqi	19–21, 21–16, 9–21	(silver) Runner-up	
2018	New Zealand Open	Super 300	(Indonesia) Jonatan Christie	21–14, 21–19	(gold) Winner	
2019	Thailand Masters	Super 300	(Singapore) Loh Kean Yew	19–21, 18–21	(silver) Runner-up	
2019	Malaysia Open	Super 750	(China) Chen Long	9–21, 21–17, 21–11	(gold) Winner	
2019	Korea Masters	Super 300	(Japan) Kanta Tsuneyama	22–24, 12–21	(silver) Runner-up	

=== BWF Superseries (21 titles, 10 runners-up) ===
The BWF Superseries, which was launched on 14 December 2006 and implemented in 2007, was a series of elite badminton tournaments, sanctioned by the Badminton World Federation (BWF). BWF Superseries levels were Superseries and Superseries Premier. A season of Superseries consisted of twelve tournaments around the world that had been introduced since 2011. Successful players were invited to the Superseries Finals, which were held at the end of each year.

Men's singles
Year	Tournament	Opponent	Score	Result	Ref.
2007	Korea Open	(China) Chen Jin	21–14, 21–19	(gold) Winner	
2007	All England Open	(China) Chen Yu	21–13, 21–12	(gold) Winner	
2007	China Masters	(Malaysia) Wong Choong Hann	21–19, 21–9	(gold) Winner	
2007	Denmark Open	(China) Bao Chunlai	21–15, 21–12	(gold) Winner	
2007	Hong Kong Open	(Malaysia) Lee Chong Wei	9–21, 21–15, 21–15	(gold) Winner	
2008	Korea Open	(South Korea) Lee Hyun-il	21–4, 21–23, 23–25	(silver) Runner-up	
2008	All England Open	(China) Chen Jin	20–22, 23–25	(silver) Runner-up	
2008	Swiss Open	(Malaysia) Lee Chong Wei	21–13, 21–18	(gold) Winner	
2008	China Open	(Malaysia) Lee Chong Wei	21–18, 21–9	(gold) Winner	
2008	Hong Kong Open	(China) Chen Jin	9–21, 21–9, 17–21	(silver) Runner-up	
2009	All England Open	(Malaysia) Lee Chong Wei	21–19, 21–12	(gold) Winner	
2009	Swiss Open	(Malaysia) Lee Chong Wei	16–21, 16–21	(silver) Runner-up	
2009	French Open	(Indonesia) Taufik Hidayat	21–6, 21–15	(gold) Winner	
2009	China Masters	(Thailand) Boonsak Ponsana	21–17, 21–17	(gold) Winner	
2009	China Open	(Denmark) Jan Ø. Jørgensen	21–12, 21–12	(gold) Winner	
2010	China Masters	(China) Chen Long	21–15, 13–21, 21–14	(gold) Winner	
2010	Japan Open	(Malaysia) Lee Chong Wei	20–22, 21–16, 17–21	(silver) Runner-up	
2011	Korea Open	(Malaysia) Lee Chong Wei	21–19, 14–21, 21–16	(gold) Winner	
2011	All England Open	(Malaysia) Lee Chong Wei	17–21, 17–21	(silver) Runner-up	
2011	Singapore Open	(China) Chen Jin	Walkover	(silver) Runner-up	
2011	China Open	(China) Chen Long	21–17, 26–24	(gold) Winner	
2011	Hong Kong Open	(China) Chen Jin	21–12, 21–19	(gold) Winner	
2011	BWF Super Series Finals	(China) Chen Long	21–12, 21–16	(gold) Winner	
2012	Korea Open	(Malaysia) Lee Chong Wei	21–12, 18–21, 14–21	(silver) Runner-up	
2012	All England Open	(Malaysia) Lee Chong Wei	21–19, 6–2^{r}	(gold) Winner	
2014	Australian Open	(Indonesia) Simon Santoso	22–24, 21–16, 21–7	(gold) Winner	
2014	China Open	(India) Srikanth Kidambi	19–21, 17–21	(silver) Runner-up	
2015	Malaysia Open	(China) Chen Long	22–20, 13–21, 11–21	(silver) Runner-up	
2015	Japan Open	(Denmark) Viktor Axelsen	21–19, 16–21, 21–19	(gold) Winner	
2016	All England Open	(China) Tian Houwei	21–9, 21–10	(gold) Winner	
2017	Malaysia Open	(Malaysia) Lee Chong Wei	21–19, 21–14	(gold) Winner	

BWF Super Series Finals tournament
BWF Super Series Premier tournament
BWF Super Series tournament

=== IBF/BWF Grand Prix (28 titles, 6 runners-up) ===
The BWF Grand Prix had two levels, the Grand Prix and Grand Prix Gold. It was a series of badminton tournaments sanctioned by the Badminton World Federation (BWF) and played between 2007 and 2017. The World Badminton Grand Prix was sanctioned by the International Badminton Federation from 1983 to 2006.

Men's singles
Year	Tournament	Opponent	Score	Result	Ref.
2001	Denmark Open	(China) Bao Chunlai	5–7, 1–7, 0–7	(silver) Runner-up	
2002	Korea Open	(South Korea) Shon Seung-mo	1–7, 7–3, 7–3, 7–5	(gold) Winner	
2003	German Open	(South Korea) Lee Hyun-il	4–15, 4–15	(silver) Runner-up	
2003	Japan Open	(China) Xia Xuanze	12–15, 10–15	(silver) Runner-up	
2003	China Open	(Malaysia) Wong Choong Hann	17–16, 15–12	(gold) Winner	
2003	Denmark Open	(China) Chen Yu	15–4, 15–6	(gold) Winner	
2003	Hong Kong Open	(Thailand) Boonsak Ponsana	15–4, 9–15, 15–8	(gold) Winner	
2004	German Open	(China) Xia Xuanze	17–16, 15–9	(gold) Winner	
2004	All England Open	(Denmark) Peter Gade	9–15, 15–5, 15–8	(gold) Winner	
2004	Swiss Open	(China) Bao Chunlai	15–12, 15–6	(gold) Winner	
2004	Denmark Open	(China) Xia Xuanze	15–12, 15–11	(gold) Winner	
2004	China Open	(China) Bao Chunlai	15–11, 15–10	(gold) Winner	
2005	German Open	(Malaysia) Muhammad Hafiz Hashim	15–8, 15–8	(gold) Winner	
2005	All England Open	(China) Chen Hong	15–8, 5–15, 2–15	(silver) Runner-up	
2005	China Masters	(China) Bao Chunlai	15–6, 15–13	(gold) Winner	
2005	Malaysia Open	(Malaysia) Lee Chong Wei	15–17, 15–9, 9–15	(silver) Runner-up	
2005	Japan Open	(China) Chen Hong	15–4, 2–0^{r}	(gold) Winner	
2005	Hong Kong Open	(China) Bao Chunlai	15–4, 15–6	(gold) Winner	
2006	All England Open	(South Korea) Lee Hyun-il	15–7, 15–7	(gold) Winner	
2006	Malaysia Open	(Malaysia) Lee Chong Wei	18–21, 21–18, 21–23	(silver) Runner-up	
2006	Japan Open	(Indonesia) Taufik Hidayat	16–21, 21–16, 21–3	(gold) Winner	
2006	Chinese Taipei Open	(Malaysia) Lee Chong Wei	21–18, 12–21, 21–11	(gold) Winner	
2006	Macau Open	(Malaysia) Lee Chong Wei	21–18, 18–21, 21–18	(gold) Winner	
2006	Hong Kong Open	(Malaysia) Lee Chong Wei	21–19, 8–21, 21–16	(gold) Winner	
2007	German Open	(China) Chen Yu	Walkover	(gold) Winner	
2008	Thailand Open	(Thailand) Boonsak Ponsana	17–21, 21–15, 21–13	(gold) Winner	
2011	German Open	(China) Chen Jin	21–19, 21–11	(gold) Winner	
2012	German Open	(Indonesia) Simon Santoso	21–11, 21–11	(gold) Winner	
2014	China Masters	(China) Tian Houwei	21–14, 21–9	(gold) Winner	
2014	Chinese Taipei Open	(China) Wang Zhengming	21–19, 21–14	(gold) Winner	
2015	Brasil Open	(Spain) Pablo Abián	21–13, 21–17	(gold) Winner	
2016	German Open	(Chinese Taipei) Chou Tien-chen	15–21, 21–17, 21–17	(gold) Winner	
2016	China Masters	(China) Chen Long	21–17, 23–21	(gold) Winner	
2017	Swiss Open	(China) Shi Yuqi	21–12, 21–11	(gold) Winner	

BWF Grand Prix Gold tournament
BWF Grand Prix tournament

=== Invitational tournament ===
Men's singles
Year	Tournament	Opponent	Score	Result	Ref.
2012	Copenhagen Masters	(Denmark) Peter Gade	22–20, 16–21, 14–21	(silver) Runner-up	

Men's doubles
Year	Tournament	Partner	Opponent	Score	Result	Ref.
2014	China International Challenge	(Malaysia) Lee Chong Wei	(China) Cai Yun (China) Fu Haifeng	18–21, 19–21	(silver) Runner-up	

== Performance timeline ==
Key

W	Won	F	Finalist	SF	Semi-finalist
QF	Quarter-finalist	#R	Rounds 4, 3, 2, 1	RR	Round-robin stage
Q#	Qualification round	A	Absent	w/d	Withdrew
G	Gold	S	Silver	B	Bronze
NH	Not held	N/A	Not applicable	DNQ	Did not qualify

=== Singles ===
This table is current through 2020 All England Open.

Tournament	1999	2000	2001	2002	2003	2004	2005	2006	2007	2008	2009	2010	2011	2012	2013	2014	2015	2016	2017	2018	2019	2020	SR	W–L	Win %	Ref
Team
Thomas Cup	N/A	A	N/A	SF-B; 3–0	N/A	G 5–0	N/A	G 5–0	N/A	G 4–1	N/A	G 5–0	N/A	G 5–0	N/A	SF-B; 2–0	N/A	QF; 3–0	N/A	G 2–0	N/A		6 / 9	34–1	97%	
Sudirman Cup	A	N/A	A	N/A	A	N/A	G 5–0	N/A	G 3–1	N/A	G 5–0	N/A	G 5–0	N/A	A	N/A	G 3–0	N/A	S 2–0	N/A	A	N/A	5 / 6	23–1	96%	
Asian Games	N/A			SF-B; 0–1	N/A			G 3–1	N/A			G 3–0	N/A			S 3–0	N/A			G 0–0	N/A		3 / 5	9–2	82%	
East Asian Games	N/A										G 2–0	N/A			A	N/A							1 / 1	2–0	100%	
Individual competitions
Summer Olympic Games	N/A	A	N/A			1R; 0–1	N/A			G 5–0	N/A			G 5–0	N/A			4th 4–2	N/A				2 / 4	14–3	82%	
World Championships	A	N/A	A	N/A	3R; 2–1	N/A	S 4–1	G 5–0	G 5–0	N/A	G 6–0	QF; 3–1	G 6–0	N/A	G 6–0	A	QF; 3–1	N/A	S 5–1	3R; 2–1	2R; 1–1	N/A	5 / 12	48–7	87%	
World Cup	not held						G 4–0	G 4–0	not held														2 / 2	8–0	100%	
Asian Games	N/A			A	N/A			S 3–1	N/A			G 4–0	N/A			G 5–0	N/A			A	N/A		2 / 3	12–1	92%	
Asia Championships	absent		S 5–1	absent						SF-B; 4–1	A	G 6–0	G 6–0	SF-B*; 4–0	QF*; 3–0	G 5–0	G 5–0	SF-B; 3–1	S 4–1	1R; 0–1	2R; 1–1	N/A	4 / 12	46–6	88%	
East Asian Games	N/A		NH	N/A			NH	N/A			S 2–1	N/A			A	N/A							0 / 1	2–1	67%	
BWF tournaments
BWF Super Series Finals^{[1]}	not held									absent			W 5–0	absent									1 / 1	5–0	100%	
All England Open	absent			SF; 4–1	2R; 1–1	W 6–0	F 5–1	W 6–0	W 5–0	F 4–1	W 5–0	QF; 2–1	F 4–1	W 5–0	absent		SF; 3–1	W 5–0	SF; 3–1	F 4–1	1R; 0–1	2R; 1–1	6 / 17	63–11	85%	
Indonesia Open	absent			1R; 0–1	3R; 2–1	SF; 4–1	absent				QF; 2–1	A	2R; 1–1	absent			1R; 0–1	2R; 1–1	1R; 0–1	1R; 0–1	2R; 1–1	N/A	0 / 10	11–10	52%	
China Open	3R; 2–1	NH	QF; 2–1	2R; 1–1	W 5–0	W 5–0	2R; 2–1	A	1R; 0–1	W 5–0	W 5–0	QF*; 2–0	W 5–0	absent		F 4–1	SF; 3–1	A	1R; 0–1	1R; 0–1	1R; 0–1	N/A	5 / 16	41–10	80%	
Malaysia Open	absent		QF; 5–1	QF; 3–1	2R; 1–1	QF; 3–1	F 4–1	F 5–1	2R; 1–1	absent			QF*; 2–0	2R; 1–1	absent		F 4–1	QF; 2–1	W 5–0	2R; 1–1	W 5–0	N/A	2 / 14	42–11	79%	
Japan Open	absent			3R; 1–1	F 5–1	SF; 3–1	W 5–0	W 5–0	SF; 3–1	absent		F 4–1	SF*; 3–0	absent		QF; 4–1	W 5–0	A	QF; 2–1	QF; 2–1	1R; 0–1	N/A	3 / 13	42–9	82%	
Denmark Open	absent		F 5–1	2R; 1–1	W 6–0	W 6–0	absent		W 5–0	absent			2R; 1–1	absent		2R*; 1–0	QF; 2–1	absent		2R; 1–1	1R; 0–1	absent	3 / 10	28–6	82%	
French Open	absent							NH	SF; 3–1	A	W 5–0	A	SF; 3–1	absent			1R; 0–1	absent		1R; 0–1	2R; 1–1	N/A	1 / 6	12–5	71%	
China Masters	not held						W 5–0	SF; 2–1	W 5–0	1R*; 0–0	W 5–0	W 5–0	SF; 3–1	absent		W 5–0	A	W 6–0	SF; 3–1	1R; 0–1	1R; 0–1	N/A	6 / 12	39–5	89%	
Malaysia Masters	not held										absent									1R; 0–1	A	1R; 0–1	0 / 2	0–2	0%	
Indonesia Masters	not held											absent							NH	1R; 0–1	1R; 0–1	1R; 0–1	0 / 3	0–3	0%	
India Open	not held									absent							QF; 2–1	2R; 1–1	absent			N/A	0 / 2	3–2	60%	
Singapore Open	A	NH	2R; 1–1	1R; 0–1	SF; 4–1	A	SF; 4–1	A	QF; 2–1	absent			F* 4–0	absent				SF; 3–1	absent		1R; 0–1	N/A	0 / 8	18–7	72%	
Thailand Open	absent			NH	absent					W 6–0	A	NH	A	SF; 4–1	A	NH	absent				2R; 1–1	N/A	1 / 3	11–2	85%	
Korea Open	absent			W 5–0	absent				W 5–0	F 4–1	absent		W 5–0	F 4–1	absent		2R; 1–1	absent		2R; 1–1	1R; 0–1	N/A	3 / 8	25–5	83%	
Hong Kong Open	A	NH	A	NH	W 6–0	NH	W 5–0	W 6–0	W 5–0	F 4–1	A	QF*; 2–0	W 5–0	absent			2R; 1–1	A	QF; 2–1	1R; 0–1	2R; 1–1	N/A	5 / 10	36–4	90%	
Thailand Masters	not held																	absent			F 4–1	1R; 0–1	0 / 2	4–2	67%	
Spain Masters	not held																			absent		w/d	0 / 0	0–0	0%	
German Open	absent				F 5–1	W 5–0	W 6–0	SF; 4–1	W 5–0	absent			W 6–0	W 6–0	absent			W 6–0	3R; 2–1	QF; 2–1	2R; 1–1	N/A	6 / 11	48–5	91%	
Swiss Open	absent					W 5–0	absent		SF; 3–1	W 5–0	F 4–1	QF; 2–1	absent						W 6–0	A	QF; 2–1	N/A	3 / 7	27–4	87%	
New Zealand Open	absent											NH	A	NH	absent					W 5–0	SF; 3–1	N/A	1 / 2	8–1	89%	
Australian Open	A	NH	absent													W 5–0	1R; 0–1	A	QF; 2–1	A	QF; 2–1	N/A	1 / 4	9–3	75%	
US Open	absent																			1R; 0–1	A	N/A	0 / 1	0–1	0%	
Brazil Open	not held															A	W 6–0	A	not held				1 / 1	6–0	100%	
Chinese Taipei Open	absent		NH	absent				W 5–0	absent							W 6–0	SF; 4–1	absent				N/A	2 / 3	15–1	94%	
Macau Open	not held							W 6–0	absent													N/A	1 / 1	6–0	100%	
Korea Masters	not held								absent												F 4–1	N/A	0 / 1	4–1	80%	
Dutch Open	absent		QF; 2–1	absent																		N/A	0 / 1	2–1	67%	
SaarLorLux Open	absent																			3R; 1–1	A	A	0 / 1	1–1	50%	
Tournament	1999	2000	2001	2002	2003	2004	2005	2006	2007	2008	2009	2010	2011	2012	2013	2014	2015	2016	2017	2018	2019	2020	R	W–L	Win %	Ref
Career Statistics
	1999	2000	2001	2002	2003	2004	2005	2006	2007	2008	2009	2010	2011	2012	2013	2014	2015	2016	2017	2018	2019	2020	Total			
Tournaments played	1	0	7	10	10	10	11	13	14	10	10	11	16	8	2	10	16	10	13	20	21	4	226			
Titles	0	0	0	1	3	6	6	9	8	5	7	5	8	4	1	5	4	3	2	3	1	0	81			
Finals Reached	0	0	2	1	5	6	9	11	8	8	9	6	10	5	1	7	5	3	5	4	3	0	108			
Overall win–loss	2–1	0–0	21–7	18–8	37–7	42–4	49–5	59–5	50–7	41–5	41–3	38–4	64–5	34–3	9–0	40–2	42–12	34–7	35–10	21–17	27—20	1—4	705–136			
Win Percentage	67%	0%	75%	69%	84%	91%	91%	92%	88%	89%	93%	90%	93%	92%	100%	95%	78%	83%	88%	55%	57%	20%	83.83%			
Year End Ranking						1	1	1	1	2	2	6	2	4	101	6	4	6	6	13	17	19				

* : Means Lin Dan gave a walkover at his last round of this tournament (Lost the match and didn't count into the number of loss) Notes

- ^{^{1}} BWF Super Series Finals was held from 2008 to 2017, when BWF World Tour Finals replaced it.

== Longest winning streak ==
=== 34 match winning streak ===
In 2006, Lin created a record by winning 34 matches in a row.

#	Tournament	Category	Start date	Rd	Opponent	Score
–	Malaysia Open	Grand Prix	18 June 2006	F	(Malaysia) Lee Chong Wei	18–21, 21–18, 21–23
1	Chinese Taipei Open	Grand Prix	21 June 2006	1R	(Thailand) Poompat Sapkulchananart	21–12, 21–11
2	Chinese Taipei Open	Grand Prix	22 June 2006	2R	(Malaysia) Muhammad Roslin Hashim	21–16, 21–11
3	Chinese Taipei Open	Grand Prix	23 June 2006	QF	(England) Rajiv Ouseph	21–14, 21–13
4	Chinese Taipei Open	Grand Prix	24 June 2006	SF	(China) Chen Jin	21–13, 21–17
5	Chinese Taipei Open	Grand Prix	25 June 2006	F	(Malaysia) Lee Chong Wei	21–18, 12–21, 21–11
6	Macau Open	Grand Prix	19 July 2006	1R	(Macau) Chan Io Chong	21–5, 21–15
7	Macau Open	Grand Prix	19 July 2006	2R	(South Korea) Shon Seung-mo	21–14, 20–22, 21–10
8	Macau Open	Grand Prix	20 July 2006	3R	(Japan) Shōji Satō	22–20, 21–9
9	Macau Open	Grand Prix	21 July 2006	QF	(Malaysia) Muhammad Hafiz Hashim	19–21, 21–18, 21–15
10	Macau Open	Grand Prix	22 July 2006	SF	(South Korea) Lee Hyun-il	21–10, 21–17
11	Macau Open	Grand Prix	23 July 2006	F	(Malaysia) Lee Chong Wei	21–18, 18–21, 21–18
12	Hong Kong Open	Grand Prix	29 August 2006	1R	(Hong Kong) Agus Hariyanto	21–19, 19–21, 21–12
13	Hong Kong Open	Grand Prix	30 August 2006	2R	(Thailand) Poompat Sapkulchananart	21–11, 21–15
14	Hong Kong Open	Grand Prix	31 August 2006	3R	(Malaysia) Yeoh Kay Bin	21–18, 22–20
15	Hong Kong Open	Grand Prix	1 September 2006	QF	(Indonesia) Taufik Hidayat	4–1^{r}
16	Hong Kong Open	Grand Prix	2 September 2006	SF	(Denmark) Kenneth Jonassen	16–21, 23–21, 21–16
17	Hong Kong Open	Grand Prix	3 September 2006	F	(Malaysia) Lee Chong Wei	21–19, 8–21, 21–16
18	World Championships		20 September 2006	1R	(Canada) Bobby Milroy	21–16, 21–17
19	World Championships		21 September 2006	2R	(South Korea) Park Sung-hwan	21–16, 21–12
20	World Championships		22 September 2006	QF	(Malaysia) Muhammad Hafiz Hashim	21–10, 21–9
21	World Championships		23 September 2006	SF	(China) Chen Hong	15–21, 21–19, 21–14
22	World Championships		24 September 2006	F	(China) Bao Chunlai	18–21, 21–17, 21–12
23	Japan Open	Grand Prix	10 October 2006	1R	(Japan) Yusuke Arita	21–11, 21–17
24	Japan Open	Grand Prix	11 October 2006	2R	(Denmark) Joachim Persson	21–12, 21–10
25	Japan Open	Grand Prix	12 October 2006	QF	(Malaysia) Muhammad Hafiz Hashim	21–19, 21–14
26	Japan Open	Grand Prix	13 October 2006	SF	(Denmark) Peter Gade	21–12, 21–14
27	Japan Open	Grand Prix	14 October 2006	F	(Indonesia) Taufik Hidayat	16–21, 21–16, 21–3
28	World Cup		24 October 2006	RR	(New Zealand) John Moody	21–9, 21–14
29	World Cup		27 October 2006	RR	(Malaysia) Kuan Beng Hong	21–12, 21–8
30	World Cup		28 October 2006	SF	(Indonesia) Taufik Hidayat	Walkover
31	World Cup		29 October 2006	F	(China) Chen Yu	21–19, 19–21, 21–17
32	Asian Games	Team Event	30 November 2006	RR	(India) Anup Sridhar	21–19, 21–11
33	Asian Games	Team Event	2 December 2006	RR	(Indonesia) Taufik Hidayat	17–21, 21–17, 16–21
34	Asian Games	Team Event	4 December 2006	SF	(Indonesia) Taufik Hidayat	22–20, 13–21, 21–12
–	Asian Games	Team Event	5 December 2006	F	(South Korea) Lee Hyun-il	20–22, 21–11, 13–21

== Record against selected opponents ==
Record against Year-end Finals finalists, World Championships semi-finalists, and Olympic quarter-finalists.

Player	Matches	Win	Lost	Diff.
(China) Bao Chunlai	25	20	5	+15
(China) Chen Hong	10	5	5	0
(China) Chen Jin	21	14	7	+7
(China) Chen Long	19	9	10	–1
(China) Chen Yu	6	6	0	+6
(China) Du Pengyu	3	3	0	+3
(China) Shi Yuqi	7	2	5	–3
(China) Tian Houwei	7	7	0	+7
(China) Xia Xuanze	9	5	4	+1
(China) Zhao Junpeng	2	1	1	0
(Chinese Taipei) Chou Tien-chen	10	7	3	+4
(Denmark) Anders Antonsen	1	0	1	–1
(Denmark) Viktor Axelsen	9	3	6	–3
(Denmark) Peter Gade	20	17	3	+14
(Denmark) Jan Ø. Jørgensen	16	9	7	+2
(Denmark) Peter Rasmussen	1	0	1	–1
(Denmark) Hans-Kristian Vittinghus	7	6	1	+5
(England) Rajiv Ouseph	4	4	0	+4
(India) Parupalli Kashyap	3	3	0	+3
(India) Srikanth Kidambi	5	3	2	+1
(India) B. Sai Praneeth	3	2	1	+1
(India) Lakshya Sen	2	2	0	+2
(Indonesia) Anthony Sinisuka Ginting	5	3	2	+1

Player	Matches	Win	Lost	Diff.
(Indonesia) Taufik Hidayat	17	13	4	+9
(Indonesia) Sony Dwi Kuncoro	12	9	3	+6
(Indonesia) Tommy Sugiarto	8	6	2	+4
(Japan) Kento Momota	5	1	4	–3
(Japan) Sho Sasaki	14	13	1	+12
(Malaysia) Roslin Hashim	8	8	0	+8
(Malaysia) Lee Chong Wei	40	28	12	+16
(Malaysia) Liew Daren	3	2	1	+1
(Malaysia) Wong Choong Hann	8	8	0	+8
(Singapore) Loh Kean Yew	1	0	1	–1
(Singapore) Ronald Susilo	7	5	2	+3
(South Korea) Heo Kwang-hee	2	2	0	+2
(South Korea) Lee Hyun-il	17	14	3	+11
(South Korea) Park Sung-hwan	17	13	4	+9
(South Korea) Park Tae-sang	1	1	0	+1
(South Korea) Shon Seung-mo	6	5	1	+4
(South Korea) Son Wan-ho	14	11	3	+8
(Thailand) Boonsak Ponsana	12	11	1	+10
(Thailand) Kunlavut Vitidsarn	2	2	0	+2
(Thailand) Kantaphon Wangcharoen	3	2	1	+1
(Vietnam) Nguyễn Tiến Minh	8	7	1	+6

== Records ==
Time span	Records	Players matched
Thomas Cup
2004–18	6 gold medals	Stands alone
Summer Olympic Games
2008–12	2 gold medals in men's singles (consecutive)	Viktor Axelsen
World Championships
2005–17	7 finals in men's singles	Stands alone
2006–13	5 gold medals in men's singles	Stands alone
Asian Games
2006–14	3 finals in men's singles	Stands alone
2010–14	2 gold medals in men's singles	Zhao Jianhua
2010–14	2 gold medals in men's singles	Taufik Hidayat
2006–18	3 gold medals in men's team	Stands alone
World Cup
2005–06	2 gold medals in men's singles	Liem Swie King
2005–06	2 gold medals in men's singles	Han Jian
2005–06	2 gold medals in men's singles	Icuk Sugiarto
2005–06	2 gold medals in men's singles	Yang Yang
2005–06	2 gold medals in men's singles	Joko Suprianto
Asia Championships
2001–17	4 gold medals in men's singles	Stands alone
2001–17	6 finals in men's singles	Stands alone
All England Open Badminton Championships
2004–18	10 finals in men's singles	Rudy Hartono
China Open
2003–11	5 titles in men's singles	Stands alone
Fuzhou China Open
2005–16	6 titles in men's singles	Stands alone
Hong Kong Open
2003–11	5 titles in men's singles	Lee Chong Wei
Swiss Open
2004–17	3 titles in men's singles	Chen Jin
German Open
2004–16	6 titles in men's singles	Erland Kops
Brasil Open
2015	1 title in men's singles	Scott Evans
2015	1 title in men's singles	Zulfadli Zulkiffli
