= 2003 All England Open Badminton Championships =

2003 All England Championships
Tournament details
- Dates: 11 February 2003– 16 February 2003
- Edition: 93rd
- Location: Birmingham

The 2003 Yonex All England Open was the 93rd edition of the All England Open Badminton Championships. It was held from 11 to 16 February 2003, in Birmingham, England.

It was a four star tournament and the prize money was US$125,000.

== Venue ==
- National Indoor Arena

== Final results ==
Category	Winners	Runners-up	Score
Men's singles	(Malaysia) Muhammad Hafiz Hashim	(China) Chen Hong	17–14, 15–10
Women's singles	(China) Zhou Mi	(China) Xie Xingfang	11–6, 11–5
Men's doubles	(Indonesia) Sigit Budiarto & Candra Wijaya	(South Korea) Lee Dong-soo & Yoo Yong-sung	15–5, 15–7
Women's doubles	(China) Gao Ling & Huang Sui	(China) Yang Wei & Zhang Jiewen	15–10, 15–13
Mixed doubles	(China) Zhang Jun & Gao Ling	(China) Chen Qiqiu & Zhao Tingting	11–6, 11–7

== Men's singles ==
=== Section 1 ===
Round of 32
(Malaysia) Muhammad Hafiz Hashim	15	15
(Japan) Shoji Sato	8	11
(Denmark) Anders Boesen	15	15
(Sweden) Per-Henrik Croona	7	8
(Malaysia) Hock Kin Yong	15	15
(Malaysia) Choong Hann Wong	9	5
(Japan) Hidetaka Yamada	15	15
(Germany) Conrad Hückstaedt	9	4
(China) Chen Yu	15	15
(China) Chen Gang	5	5
(England) Aamir Ghaffar	8	15	15
(Denmark) Kasper Fangel	15	6	5
(China) Xia Xuanze	15	15
(Indonesia) Indra Wijaya	2	7
(South Korea) Lee Hyun-il	15	15
(China) Lin Dan	11	6

Round of 16
(Malaysia) Hafiz Hashim	15	17
(Denmark) Boesen	9	14
(Malaysia) Yong	15	15
(Japan) Yamada	4	1
(China) Chen Yu	15	15
(England) Ghaffar	7	7
(China) Xuanze	17	10	15
(South Korea) Hyun-il	15	15	13

Quarter-finals
(Malaysia) Hafiz Hashim	15	15
(Malaysia) Yong	6	10
(China) Chen Yu	4	15	15
(China) Xuanze	15	10	11

Semi-finals
(Malaysia) Hafiz Hashim	15	15
(China) Chen Yu	12	12

=== Section 2 ===
Round of 32
(China) Chen Hong	15	15	15
(Hong Kong) Ng Wei	17	7	9
(China) Bao Chunlai	9	15	15
(Denmark) Peter Gade	15	13	11
(Malaysia) Tsuen Seng Lee	15	15
(Netherlands) Dicky Palyama	10	8
(Indonesia) Marleve Mainaky	15	15
(Denmark) Kasper Ødum	8	11
(Malaysia) Muhammad Roslin Hashim	17	15
(Singapore) Ronald Susilo	14	3
(South Korea) Shon Seung-mo	15	15
(England) Colin Haughton	2	6
(Denmark) Kenneth Jonassen	9	15	15
(China) Wu Yunyong	15	13	13
(Denmark) Niels Christian Kaldau	15	17
(Sweden) Rasmus Wengberg	1	14

Round of 16
(China) Chen Hong	15	15
(China) Chunlai	11	10
(Malaysia) Lee	15	8	17
(Indonesia) Mainaky	12	15	16
(Malaysia) Roslin Hashim	15	15
(South Korea) Seung-mo	10	1
(Denmark) Jonassen	15	15
(Denmark) Kaldau	11	4

Quarter-finals
(China) Chen Hong	15	16	15
(Malaysia) Lee	4	17	11
(Malaysia) Roslin Hashim	15	15
(Denmark) Jonassen	4	13

Semi-finals
(China) Chen Hong	17	15
(Malaysia) Roslin Hashim	16	5

== Women's singles ==
=== Section 1 ===
Round of 32
(China) Zhou Mi	11	11
(Bulgaria) Petya Nedelcheva	2	4
(Netherlands) Judith Meulendijks	11	11
(England) Julia Mann	3	1
(Indonesia) Mia Audina	13	11
(England) Jill Pittard	1	3
(Wales) Kelly Morgan	11	11
(Hong Kong) Koon Wai Chee	4	7
(China) Zhang Ning	11	11
(China) Yao Jie	2	2
(Finland) Anu Weckström	11	11
(Japan) Kaori Mori	6	5
(France) Pi Hongyan	11	11
(Japan) Kumiko Ogura	6	3
(Denmark) Camilla Martin	11	11
(China) Li Li	1	2

Round of 16
(China) Zhou Mi	11	11
(Netherlands) Meulendijks	4	7
(Indonesia) Audina	11	11
(Wales) Morgan	5	3
(China) Zhang Ning	11	11
(Finland) Weckström	8	3
(France) Hongyan	11	11
(Denmark) Martin	5	8

Quarter-finals
(China) Zhou Mi	11	11
(Indonesia) Audina	4	4
(China) Zhang Ning	11	11
(France) Hongyan	3	1

Semi-finals
(China) Zhou Mi	11	11
(China) Zhang Ning	8	8

=== Section 2 ===
Round of 32
(China) Xie Xingfang	11	11
(Austria) Simone Prutsch	0	0
(Netherlands) Karina De Wit	11	11
(England) Tracey Hallam	3	2
(China) Wang Chen	11	11
(Canada) Denyse Julien	8	5
(Germany) Nicole Grether	8	w/o
(Finland) Nina Weckström	1	ret
(China) Gong Ruina	11	11
(Germany) Petra Overzier	4	2
(Japan) Miho Tanaka	11	8	11
(Sweden) Marina Andrievskaya	3	11	7
(South Korea) Kyeung Ran Kim	11	13
(Germany) Xu Huaiwen	7	11
(Japan) Kanako Yonekura	11	11
(England) Rebecca Pantaney	2	4

Round of 16
(China) Xingfang	11	11
(Netherlands) De Wit	2	5
(China) Wang Chen	4	11	11
(Germany) Grether	11	5	0
(China) Ruina	11	11
(Japan) Tanaka	7	5
(South Korea) Ran Kim	7	11	13
(Japan) Yonekura	11	8	10

Quarter-finals
(China) Xingfang	w/o
(China) Wang Chen	scr
(China) Ruina	11	11
(South Korea) Ran Kim	6	3

Semi-finals
(China) Xingfang	13	11
(China) Ruina	12	6
