= Bao Chunlai =

Chinese badminton player (born 1983)

Bao Chunlai 鲍春来
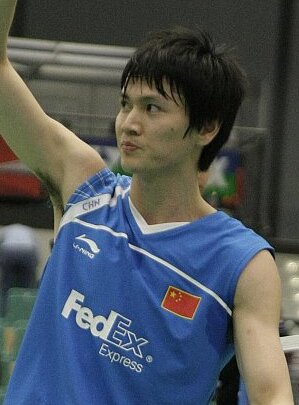
- Bao at the 2010 German Open

Personal information
- Born: 17 February 1983 (age 43) Changsha, Hunan, China
- Height: 1.90 m (6 ft 3 in)
- Weight: 80 kg (176 lb; 12 st 8 lb)

Sport
- Country: China
- Sport: Badminton
- Handedness: Left

Men's singles
- Highest ranking: 1 (5 September 2002)
- BWF profile
Medal record
Men's badminton
Representing China
World Championships
Silver medal – second place	2006 Madrid	Men's singles
Bronze medal – third place	2003 Birmingham	Men's singles
Bronze medal – third place	2007 Kuala Lumpur	Men's singles
Sudirman Cup
Gold medal – first place	2005 Beijing	Mixed team
Gold medal – first place	2007 Glasgow	Mixed team
Gold medal – first place	2009 Guangzhou	Mixed team
Gold medal – first place	2011 Qingdao	Mixed team
Silver medal – second place	2003 Eindhoven	Mixed team
Thomas Cup
Gold medal – first place	2004 Jakarta	Men's team
Gold medal – first place	2006 Sendai & Tokyo	Men's team
Gold medal – first place	2008 Jakarta	Men's team
Gold medal – first place	2010 Kuala Lumpur	Men's team
Asian Games
Gold medal – first place	2006 Doha	Men's team
Gold medal – first place	2010 Guangzhou	Men's team
Bronze medal – third place	2002 Busan	Men's team
Asian Championships
Gold medal – first place	2009 Suwon	Men's Singles
Silver medal – second place	2011 Chengdu	Men's Singles
World Junior Championships
Gold medal – first place	2000 Guangzhou	Boys' singles
Gold medal – first place	2000 Guangzhou	Mixed team
Asian Junior Championships
Gold medal – first place	2000 Kyoto	Boys' team

Bao Chunlai
- Simplified Chinese: 鲍春来
- Traditional Chinese: 鮑春來
Transcriptions
Standard Mandarin
- Hanyu Pinyin: Bào Chūnlái
- IPA: [pâʊ ʈʂʰwə́n lǎɪ]

Bao Chunlai (Chinese: 鲍春来; pinyin: Bào Chūnlái; Mandarin pronunciation: [pâʊ ʈʂʰwə́n lǎɪ]; born 17 February 1983) is a retired left-handed badminton player from China.

== Career ==
The tall, powerful Bao ranked among the world's leading singles player during the first decade of the 21st century. He was a member of China's world champion Thomas Cup (men's international) teams in 2004, 2006, 2008, and 2010. Bao won medals at three of the six BWF World Championships that he played in, earning a bronze at the 2003 and 2007 editions, and a silver at the 2006 Championships in Madrid, where he upset first seeded Lee Chong Wei in the quarterfinals before falling to teammate Lin Dan in the final. A frequent finalist in top tier international tournaments, Bao had some difficulty breaking through in them until 2009, his most successful year, which saw him capture the Asian Championships, and the German, Singapore, and Japan Opens. In 2010 he upset his superbly accomplished compatriot Lin Dan in the quarterfinals of the prestigious All England Open but was then upset in turn by Japan's Kenichi Tago. Bao's repeat win that year at the German Open was his last tournament victory on the international circuit.

Bao officially retired from the national team on 21 September 2011. In 2015 he appeared in the sports action film Full Strike.

== Achievements ==
=== World Championships ===
Men's singles
Year	Venue	Opponent	Score	Result
2003	National Indoor Arena, Birmingham, England	(China) Xia Xuanze	11–15, 7–15	Bronze
2006	Palacio de Deportes de la Comunidad, Madrid, Spain	(China) Lin Dan	21–18, 17–21, 12–21	Silver
2007	Putra Indoor Stadium, Kuala Lumpur, Malaysia	(China) Lin Dan	12–21, 20–22	Bronze

=== Asian Championships ===
Men's singles
Year	Venue	Opponent	Score	Result
2009	Suwon Indoor Stadium, Suwon, South Korea	(China) Chen Long	16–21, 21–10, 21–16	Gold
2011	Sichuan Gymnasium, Chengdu, China	(China) Lin Dan	19–21, 13–21	Silver

=== World Junior Championships ===
Boys' singles
Year	Venue	Opponent	Score	Result
2002	Tianhe Gymnasium, Guangzhou, China	(Indonesia) Sony Dwi Kuncoro	7–1, 7–5, 1–7, 7–5	Gold

=== BWF Superseries (3 titles, 5 runners-up) ===
The BWF Superseries, which was launched on 14 December 2006 and implemented in 2007, is a series of elite badminton tournaments, sanctioned by the Badminton World Federation (BWF). BWF Superseries levels are Superseries and Superseries Premier. A season of Superseries consists of twelve tournaments around the world that have been introduced since 2011. Successful players are invited to the Superseries Finals, which are held at the end of each year.

Men's singles
Year	Tournament	Opponent	Score	Result
2007	Malaysia Open	(Denmark) Peter Gade	15–21, 21–17, 14–21	(silver) Runner-up
2007	Indonesia Open	(Malaysia) Lee Chong Wei	15–21, 16–21	(silver) Runner-up
2007	Denmark Open	(China) Lin Dan	15–21, 12–21	(silver) Runner-up
2007	French Open	(Malaysia) Lee Chong Wei	11–21, 14–21	(silver) Runner-up
2007	China Open	(Malaysia) Lee Chong Wei	21–12, 21–13	(gold) Winner
2009	Singapore Open	(Thailand) Boonsak Ponsana	21–19, 16–21, 21–15	(gold) Winner
2009	Japan Open	(Indonesia) Taufik Hidayat	21–15, 21–12	(gold) Winner
2010	China Open	(China) Chen Long	21–9, 14–21, 16–21	(silver) Runner-up

=== BWF Grand Prix (5 titles, 10 runners-up) ===
The BWF Grand Prix had two levels, the BWF Grand Prix and Grand Prix Gold. It was a series of badminton tournaments sanctioned by the Badminton World Federation (BWF) which was held from 2007 to 2017. The World Badminton Grand Prix sanctioned by International Badminton Federation (IBF) from 1983 to 2006.

Men's singles
Year	Tournament	Opponent	Score	Result
2001	Dutch Open	(Malaysia) Lee Tsuen Seng	1–7, 7–1, 5–7, 4–7	(silver) Runner-up
2001	Denmark Open	(China) Lin Dan	7–5, 7–1, 7–0	(gold) Winner
2004	Swiss Open	(China) Lin Dan	12–15, 6–15	(silver) Runner-up
2004	Japan Open	(Singapore) Ronald Susilo	13–15, 6–15	(silver) Runner-up
2004	China Open	(China) Lin Dan	11–15, 10–15	(silver) Runner-up
2005	China Masters	(China) Lin Dan	6–15, 13–15	(silver) Runner-up
2005	Hong Kong Open	(China) Lin Dan	4–15, 6–15	(silver) Runner-up
2005	China Open	(China) Chen Hong	12–15, 15–8, 9–15	(silver) Runner-up
2006	Indonesia Open	(Indonesia) Taufik Hidayat	18–21, 17–21	(silver) Runner-up
2006	Korea Open	(Malaysia) Roslin Hashim	21–18, 21–16	(gold) Winner
2006	China Open	(China) Chen Hong	17–21, 19–21	(silver) Runner-up
2009	German Open	(China) Gong Weijie	21–18, 21–14	(gold) Winner
2010	German Open	(China) Chen Long	21–13, 21–10	(gold) Winner
2010	Korea Grand Prix	(China) Wang Zhengming	23–21, 21–18	(gold) Winner
2011	Malaysia Grand Prix Gold	(Malaysia) Lee Chong Wei	9–21, 19–21	(silver) Runner-up

== Performance timeline ==
=== Singles performance timeline ===
Key

W	Won	F	Finalist	SF	Semi-finalist
QF	Quarter-finalist	#R	Rounds 4, 3, 2, 1	RR	Round-robin stage
Q#	Qualification round	A	Absent	w/d	Withdrew
G	Gold	S	Silver	B	Bronze
NH	Not held	N/A	Not applicable	DNQ	Did not qualify

Tournament	2001	2002	2003	2004	2005	2006	2007	2008	2009	2010	2011	SR	W–L	Win %
Summer Olympics	NH			2R; 1–1	NH			QF; 2–1	NH			0 / 2	3–2	60%
World Championships	A	NH	SF-B; 4–1	NH	QF; 3–1	S 5–1	SF-B; 3–1	NH	1R; 0–1	3R; 2–1	A	0 / 6	17–6	74%
World Cup	NH				RR; 1–1	RR; 1–1	NH					0 / 2	2–2	50%
World Superseries Finals	NH							DNQ	SF; 2–2	DNQ		0 / 1	2–2	50%
Asian Championships	Absent							3R; 2–1	G 6–0	A	S 5–1	1 / 3	13–2	87%
Asian Games	NH	A	NH			QF; 2–1	NH			A	NH	0 / 1	2–1	67%
East Asian Games	NH								A	NH		0 / 0		
Team Competitions
Thomas Cup	NH	SF-B; 1–1	NH	G 4–0	NH	G 5–0	NH	G 5–0	NH	G 1–0	NH	4 / 5	16–1	94%
Sudirman Cup	A	NH	A	NH	A	NH	A	NH	A	NH	A	0 / 0		
Asian Games	NH	SF-B; 0–0	NH			G 2–0	NH			G 0–0	NH	2 / 3	2–0	100%
East Asian Games	NH								A	MH		0 / 0		
BWF World Superseries Premier
Korea Open	1R; 0–1	3R; 1–1	A	3R; 2–1	A	W 6–0	SF; 3–1	QF; 2–1	A	QF; 2–1	2R; 1–1	1 / 8	17–7	71%
All England Open	A	SF; 4–1	3R; 2–1	2R; 1–1	QF; 3–1	2R; 1–1	SF; 3–1	SF; 3–1	2R; 1–1	SF; 3–1	2R; 1–1	0 / 9	18–9	67%
Indonesia Open	A	SF; 4–1	3R; 2–1	SF; 4–1	A	F 5–1	F 4–1	SF; 3–1	Absent		2R; 1–1	0 / 7	23–7	77%
Denmark Open	W 6–0	A	1R; 0–1	Absent			F 4–1	Absent				1 / 3	10–2	83%
China Open	2R; 2–1	A	QF; 3–1	F 5–1	F 5–1	A	W 5–0	A	1R; 0–1	F 4–1	A	1 / 7	24–6	80%
BWF World Superseries
Malaysia Open	1R; 2–1	SF; 4–1	QF; 3–1	QF; 3–1	SF; 4–1	A	F 4–1	QF; 2–1	A	2R; 1–1	1R; 0–1	0 / 9	23–9	72%
India Open	NH							3R; 1–1	Absent			0 / 1	1–1	50%
Singapore Open	3R; 2–1	QF; 3–1	QF; 3–1	SF; 4–1	QF; 3–1	SF; 4–1	Absent		W 5–0	A	2R; 1–1	1 / 8	25–7	78%
China Masters	NH				F 4–1	A	QF; 2–1	SF; 3–1	2R; 1–1	SF; 3–1	A	0 / 5	13–5	72%
Japan Open	A	QF; 2–1	1R; 0–1	F 4–1	QF; 2–1	2R; 0–1	1R; 0–1	A	W 5–0	QF; 2–1	A	1 / 8	15–7	68%
French Open	Absent					NH	F 4–1	A	QF; 2–1	Absent		0 / 2	6–2	75%
Hong Kong Open	A	NH	SF; 4–1	NH	F 4–1	A	2R; 1–1	A	SF; 3–1	Absent		0 / 4	12–4	75%
BWF Grand Prix Gold and Grand Prix
German Open	Absent		SF; 4–1	A	SF; 4–1	3R; 2–1	Absent		W 6–0	W 6–0	A	2 / 5	22–3	88%
Swiss Open	Absent			F 4–1	Absent		2R; 1–1	SF; 3–1	1R; 0–1	Absent		0 / 4	8–4	67%
Dutch Open	F 5–1	Absent										0 / 1	5–1	83%
Philippines Open	NH					A	3R; 2–1	NH	A	NH		0 / 1	2–1	67%
Macau Open	NH					QF; 3–1	QF; 3–1	1R; 0–1	Absent			0 / 3	6–3	67%
Korea Open	NH						Absent			W 5–0	A	1 / 1	5–0	100%
U.S. Open	Absent										QF; 3–1	0 / 1	3–1	75%
Career Statistics
	2001	2002	2003	2004	2005	2006	2007	2008	2009	2010	2011			
Tournaments Played	6	7	10	10	10	12	14	11	12	11	7	110		
Titles	1	0	0	1	0	3	1	1	4	4	0	15		
Finals Reached	2	0	0	4	3	5	5	1	4	5	1	29		
Overall win–loss	17–5	15–6	25–10	32–9	33–10	36–9	39–13	26–10	31–9	29–7	12–7	295–95		
Win Percentage	77%	71%	71%	78%	77%	80%	75%	72%	78%	81%	63%	75.64%		
Year End Ranking								8	8	8	31			

== Record against selected opponents ==
Record against year-end Finals finalists, World Championships semi finalists, and Olympic quarter finalists, plus all Olympic opponents.

- (China) Chen Hong 2–8
- (China) Chen Jin 5–2
- (China) Chen Long 3–2
- (China) Chen Yu 6–1
- (China) Lin Dan 7–20
- (China) Xia Xuanze 1–1
- (Chinese Taipei) Fung Permadi 1–0
- (Chinese Taipei) Chou Tien-chen 1–0
- (Denmark) Peter Gade 4–6
- (Denmark) Joachim Persson 4–1
- (Guatemala) Kevin Cordón 1–0
- (Hong Kong) Hu Yun 1–0
- (Indonesia) Taufik Hidayat 10–6
- (Indonesia) Hendrawan 1–0
- (Indonesia) Sony Dwi Kuncoro 9–3
- (Indonesia) Simon Santoso 4–0
- (Japan) Kenichi Tago 0–2
- (Japan) Shoji Sato 4–0
- (South Korea) Lee Hyun-il 9–4
- (South Korea) Park Sung-hwan 5–1
- (South Korea) Park Tae-sang 2–2
- (South Korea) Shon Seung-mo 5–1
- (Malaysia) Lee Chong Wei 4–13
- (Poland) Przemyslaw Wacha 5–0
- (Singapore) Ronald Susilo 6–2
- (Thailand) Boonsak Ponsana 6–2

=== Head-to-head vs. top 20 ranked players ===
Bao's win–loss record against players who have been ranked world No. 20 or higher is as follows:

Players who have been Olympic, world champion or ranked world No. 1 are in boldface.

Nationality	Player	Head-to-head
CHN	**Chen Hong**	4–5
CHN	**Chen Jin**	5–2
CHN	**Chen Long**	3–3
CHN	Du Pengyu	1–1
CHN	**Lin Dan**	5–20
CHN	Qiao Bin	2–0
CHN	Wang Zhengming	1–0
CHN	**Xia Xuanze**	1–1
TPE	Chou Tien-chen	1–0
DEN	**Viktor Axelsen**	0–1
DEN	**Peter Gade**	4–6
DEN	Kenneth Jonassen	1–1
DEN	Joachim Persson	4–1
ENG	Rajiv Ouseph	1–0
ENG	Andrew Smith	3–0
GER	Marc Zwiebler	1–0
HKG	Chan Yan Kit	5–0
HKG	Hu Yun	1–0
HKG	Ng Wei	3–0
HKG	Wei Nan	1–0
IND	Chetan Anand	1–0
IND	Arvind Bhat	1–0
IND	Parupalli Kashyap	3–0
INA	**Taufik Hidayat**	9–5

Nationality	Player	Head-to-head
INA	Sony Dwi Kuncoro	7–3
INA	Dionysius Hayom Rumbaka	2–0
INA	Simon Santoso	4–0
JPN	Sho Sasaki	6–0
JPN	Shōji Satō	5–0
JPN	Kenichi Tago	0–2
JPN	Takuma Ueda	1–0
JPN	Kazushi Yamada	2–0
KOR	**Lee Hyun-il**	9–4
KOR	Park Sung-hwan	5–1
KOR	**Son Wan-ho**	2–0
MAS	Chong Wei Feng	2–0
MAS	**Lee Chong Wei**	4–13
MAS	Muhammad Hafiz Hashim	2–2
MAS	**Muhammad Roslin Hashim**	6–1
MAS	**Wong Choong Hann**	9–3
NED	Dicky Palyama	3–2
POL	Przemysław Wacha	5–0
SIN	Kendrick Lee Yen Hui	3–0
SIN	Ronald Susilo	6–2
THA	Boonsak Ponsana	6–1
VIE	Nguyễn Tiến Minh	4–2
WAL	Richard Vaughan	1–0

* Statistics are correct as of 28 October 2019.

=== Players with winning records against Bao ===
Nationality	Player	Head-to-head
CHN	Chen Hong	4–5
CHN	Lin Dan	5–20
CHN	Wu Yunyong	0–1
TPE	Liao Sheng-shiun	0–1
DEN	Viktor Axelsen	0–1
DEN	Peter Gade	4–6

Nationality	Player	Head-to-head
INA	Budi Santoso	0–1
JPN	Keita Masuda	0–1
JPN	Kenichi Tago	0–2
KOR	Park Tae-sang	2–3
MAS	Lee Chong Wei	4–13
MAS	Ong Ewe Hock	0–1

== Filmography ==
=== Films ===
- Confidant (2019)
- The Match (2016)
- Full Strike (2015)
- Soul Transfer Station (2012)
