= 2003 IBF World Championships – Men's singles =

Badminton championships

Men's singles at the 2003 IBF World Championships
- Venue: National Indoor Arena
- Location: Birmingham, United Kingdom
- Dates: July 28, 2003 – August 3, 2003

Medalists
gold medal	Xia Xuanze	China
silver medal	Wong Choong Hann	Malaysia
bronze medal	Shon Seung-mo	South Korea
bronze medal	Bao Chunlai	China

The 2003 IBF World Championships (World Badminton Championships) took place in the National Indoor Arena in Birmingham, England, between July 28 and August 3, 2003. Following the results in the men's singles.

== Seeds ==
1. (China) Chen Hong
2. (Denmark) Kenneth Jonassen
3. (Indonesia) Taufik Hidayat
4. (Denmark) Anders Boesen
5. (China) Xia Xuanze
6. (Indonesia) Sony Dwi Kuncoro
7. (Hong Kong) Agus Hariyanto
8. (South Korea) Lee Hyun-il
9. (Malaysia) Wong Choong Hann
10. (Singapore) Ronald Susilo
11. (China) Ji Xinpeng
12. (Japan) Hidetaka Yamada
13. (Malaysia) Roslin Hashim
14. (South Korea) Shon Seung-mo
15. (Germany) Björn Joppien
16. (Poland) Przemysław Wacha

== Main stage ==
=== Section 1 ===
First round
(China) Xia Xuanze	15	15
(Singapore) Hendra Wijaya	6	7
(South Korea) Park Tae-sang	15	15
(Japan) Shoji Sato	8	8
(China) Lin Dan	15	15
(Sweden) Per-Henrik Croona	6	8
(Poland) Przemysław Wacha	9	15	15
(Canada) Sam Smith	15	4	2
(Denmark) Kenneth Jonassen	15	15	15
(Malaysia) Lee Tsuen Seng	17	11	10
(Belgium) David Jaco	4	15	15
(Brazil) Guilherme Pardo	15	8	6
(Hong Kong) Ng Wei	15	15
(Japan) Shinya Ohtsuka	11	3
(Wales) Irwansyah	15	15
(United States) Eric Go	3	3

Second round
(China) Xia Xuanze	15	15
(South Korea) Park Tae-sang	5	13
(China) Lin Dan	15	15
(Poland) Przemysław Wacha	13	9
(Denmark) Kenneth Jonassen	15	15
(Belgium) David Jaco	3	1
(Hong Kong) Ng Wei	15	15
(Wales) Irwansyah	3	7

Third round
(China) Xia Xuanze	15	15
(China) Lin Dan	10	3
(Denmark) Kenneth Jonassen	15	17
(Hong Kong) Ng Wei	8	16

Quarterfinals
(China) Xia Xuanze	17	12	15
(Denmark) Kenneth Jonassen	14	15	10

=== Section 2 ===
First round
(China) Bao Chunlai	15	15
(France) Jean-Michel Lefort	6	0
(Germany) Björn Joppien	15	15
(Spain) Arturo Ruiz	5	3
(Indonesia) Taufik Hidayat	15	15
(India) Abhinn Shyam Gupta	7	10
(Finland) Kasperi Salo	15	10	17
(Slovenia) Andrej Pohar	7	15	14
(Malaysia) Roslin Hashim	15	15
(Thailand) Boonsak Ponsana	12	9
(Malaysia) Hafiz Hashim	15	15
(Russia) Stanislav Pukhov	5	5
(South Korea) Lee Hyun-il	15	15
(Czech Republic) Jan Vondra	6	7
(Philippines) Kennevic Asuncion	17	15
(England) Andrew Smith	14	8

Second round
(China) Bao Chunlai	15	15
(Germany) Björn Joppien	5	4
(Indonesia) Taufik Hidayat	15	15
(Finland) Kasperi Salo	10	8
(Malaysia) Roslin Hashim	15	15
(Malaysia) Hafiz Hashim	11	8
(South Korea) Lee Hyun-il	15	15
(Philippines) Kennevic Asuncion	7	4

Third round
(China) Bao Chunlai	15	15
(Indonesia) Taufik Hidayat	9	4
(Malaysia) Roslin Hashim	15	13	17
(South Korea) Lee Hyun-il	10	15	14

Quarterfinals
(China) Bao Chunlai	15	15
(Malaysia) Roslin Hashim	7	10

=== Section 3 ===
First round
(Malaysia) Wong Choong Hann	15	15
(Japan) Keita Masuda	5	11
(Indonesia) Budi Santoso	15	13	15
(England) Colin Haughton	2	15	6
(Denmark) Anders Boesen	15	15
(Bulgaria) Georgi Petrov	9	5
(Netherlands) Dicky Palyama	15	15
(Finland) Antti Viitikko	5	12
(Indonesia) Sony Dwi Kuncoro	15	15
(Denmark) Peter Gade	11	6
(Portugal) Marco Vasconcelos	15	15
(Guatemala) Pedro Yang	5	5
(Singapore) Ronald Susilo	15	15
(England) Aamir Ghaffar	2	7
(Denmark) Peter Rasmussen	15	9	15
(India) Nikhil Kanetkar	4	15	5

Second round
(Malaysia) Wong Choong Hann	15	15
(Indonesia) Budi Santoso	6	13
(Denmark) Anders Boesen	15	15
(Netherlands) Dicky Palyama	8	2
(Indonesia) Sony Dwi Kuncoro	15	15
(Portugal) Marco Vasconcelos	9	3
(Singapore) Ronald Susilo	8	15	15
(Denmark) Peter Rasmussen	15	12	5

Third round
(Malaysia) Wong Choong Hann	15	15
(Denmark) Anders Boesen	6	6
(Indonesia) Sony Dwi Kuncoro	15	15
(Singapore) Ronald Susilo	9	13

Quarterfinals
(Malaysia) Wong Choong Hann	15	15
(Indonesia) Sony Dwi Kuncoro	8	5

=== Section 4 ===
First round
(South Korea) Shon Seung-mo	15	15
(Indonesia) Marleve Mainaky	2	6
(Ukraine) Vladislav Druzchenko	11	15	15
(Austria) Jürgen Koch	15	13	0
(Hong Kong) Agus Hariyanto	15	15
(Canada) Bobby Milroy	10	12
(Czech Republic) Jan Fröhlich	15	15
(Wales) Richard Vaughan	7	1
(China) Chen Hong
bye
(Germany) Jens Roch	15	15
(France) Nabil Lasmari	4	8
(Japan) Hidetaka Yamada	15	13	15
(Sweden) Rasmus Wengberg	8	15	2
(Spain) Sergio Llopis	17	15
(Norway) Jim Ronny Andersen	15	10

Second round
(South Korea) Shon Seung-mo	8	15	15
(Ukraine) Vladislav Druzchenko	15	11	1
(Hong Kong) Agus Hariyanto	15	15
(Czech Republic) Jan Fröhlich	6	10
(China) Chen Hong	15	15
(Germany) Jens Roch	5	1
(Japan) Hidetaka Yamada	15	15
(Spain) Sergio Llopis	6	8

Third round
(South Korea) Shon Seung-mo	8	15	15
(Hong Kong) Agus Hariyanto	15	2	2
(China) Chen Hong	15	15
(Japan) Hidetaka Yamada	7	9

Quarterfinals
(South Korea) Shon Seung-mo	5	17	15
(China) Chen Hong	15	14	9

== Final stage ==
Quarterfinals
(China) Xia Xuanze	17	12	15
(Denmark) Kenneth Jonassen	14	15	10
(China) Bao Chunlai	15	15
(Malaysia) Roslin Hashim	7	10
(Malaysia) Wong Choong Hann	15	15
(Indonesia) Sony Dwi Kuncoro	8	5
(South Korea) Shon Seung-mo	5	17	15
(China) Chen Hong	15	14	9

Semifinals
(China) Xia Xuanze	15	15
(China) Bao Chunlai	11	7
(Malaysia) Wong Choong Hann	15	15
(South Korea) Shon Seung-mo	4	5

Finals
(China) Xia Xuanze	15	13	15
(Malaysia) Wong Choong Hann	6	15	6
