= Badminton at the 2006 Asian Games – Men's singles =

Men's singles at the 2006 Asian Games
- Venue: Aspire Hall 3
- Dates: 5–9 December
- Competitors: 30 from 15 nations

Medalists
gold medal	Taufik Hidayat	Indonesia
silver medal	Lin Dan	China
bronze medal	Lee Hyun-il	South Korea
bronze medal	Lee Chong Wei	Malaysia

The badminton men's singles tournament at the 2006 Asian Games in Doha took place from 5 December to 9 December at Aspire Hall 3.

== Schedule ==
All times are Arabia Standard Time (UTC+03:00)

Date	Time	Event
Tuesday, 5 December 2006	09:00	Round of 32
Wednesday, 6 December 2006	09:00	Round of 32
Wednesday, 6 December 2006	17:00	Round of 16
Thursday, 7 December 2006	17:00	Quarterfinals
Friday, 8 December 2006	17:00	Semifinals
Saturday, 9 December 2006	17:00	Final

== Results ==
=== Final ===
Final
1	Lin Dan (CHN)	15	20
7	Taufik Hidayat (INA)	21	22

=== Top half ===
Round of 32
Dinuka Karunaratne (SRI)	10	13
Poompat Sapkulchananart (THA)	21	21
8	Ng Wei (HKG)	21	21
Lam Chi Man (MAC)	10	8
Simon Santoso (INA)	21	21
Nguyễn Tiến Minh (VIE)	16	19
4	Lee Hyun-il (KOR)	21	21
Olonbayaryn Enkhbat (MGL)	5	6
Chetan Anand (IND)	21	21
Sayed Jaafar Ebrahim (BRN)	9	11
5	Mohd Hafiz Hashim (MAS)	21	21
Eiad Awad (SYR)	5	6
Kendrick Lee (SIN)	19	15
Sho Sasaki (JPN)	21	21

Round of 16
1	Lin Dan (CHN)	21	21
Poompat Sapkulchananart (THA)	14	16
8	Ng Wei (HKG)	21	21
Simon Santoso (INA)	18	13
4	Lee Hyun-il (KOR)	21	21
Chetan Anand (IND)	6	9
5	Mohd Hafiz Hashim (MAS)	21	21
Sho Sasaki (JPN)	14	17

Quarterfinals
1	Lin Dan (CHN)	21	21
8	Ng Wei (HKG)	15	18
4	Lee Hyun-il (KOR)	22	21
5	Mohd Hafiz Hashim (MAS)	20	6

Semifinals
1	Lin Dan (CHN)	21	21
4	Lee Hyun-il (KOR)	3	10

=== Bottom half ===
Round of 32
Sayed Hamed Ebrahim (BRN)	6	7
Park Sung-hwan (KOR)	21	21
Nguyễn Hoàng Hải (VIE)	18	13
7	Taufik Hidayat (INA)	21	21
Tarek Shalhoum (SYR)	5	4
Ronald Susilo (SIN)	21	21
Battöriin Davaasüren (MGL)	11	4
3	Bao Chunlai (CHN)	21	21
Anup Sridhar (IND)	21	21
Diluka Karunaratne (SRI)	16	12
Chan Yan Kit (HKG)	8	13
6	Boonsak Ponsana (THA)	21	21
Chan Io Chong (MAC)	12	12
Shoji Sato (JPN)	21	21

Round of 16
Park Sung-hwan (KOR)	18	21	17
7	Taufik Hidayat (INA)	21	17	21
Ronald Susilo (SIN)	15	21	14
3	Bao Chunlai (CHN)	21	17	21
Anup Sridhar (IND)	17	21	16
6	Boonsak Ponsana (THA)	21	19	21
Shoji Sato (JPN)	17	18
2	Lee Chong Wei (MAS)	21	21

Quarterfinals
7	Taufik Hidayat (INA)	21	21
3	Bao Chunlai (CHN)	16	14
6	Boonsak Ponsana (THA)	22	11	7
2	Lee Chong Wei (MAS)	20	21	21

Semifinals
7	Taufik Hidayat (INA)	21	21
2	Lee Chong Wei (MAS)	16	18
