= 2001 Denmark Open =

Badminton tournament

The 2001 Denmark Open (then known as the Danish Open) in badminton was held in Farum, Copenhagen, from October 16 to October 21, 2001. It was a five-star tournament and the prize money was US$250,000.

== Venue ==
- Farum Hallen, Farum, Copenhagen

== Final results ==
Category	Winners	Runners-up	Score
Men's singles	(China) Bao Chunlai	(China) Lin Dan	7–5, 7–1, 7–0
Women's singles	(Denmark) Camilla Martin	(China) Pi Hongyan	8–6, 7–3, 7–0
Men's doubles	(Denmark) Martin Lundgaard & Lars Paaske	(Denmark) Jim Laugesen & Michael Sogaard	7–5, 3–7, 6–8, 7–3, 7–1
Women's doubles	(Denmark) Helene Kirkegaard & Rikke Olsen	(Denmark) Ann-Lou Jorgensen & Mette Schjoldager	7–2, 7–2, 7–3
Mixed doubles	(Indonesia) Tri Kusharyanto & Emma Ermawati	(England) Nathan Robertson & Gail Emms	7–5, 7–1, 7–4

Preceded by 2000 Denmark Open	Denmark Open	Succeeded by 2002 Denmark Open
