= 2006 China Open (badminton) =

The 2006 China Open in badminton was held from October 17 to October 22, 2006, in Guangzhou, China.

The prize money was US$250,000.

== Venue ==
- Tianhe Gymnasium

== Results ==
Category	Winners	Runners-up	Score
Men's singles	(China) Chen Hong	(China) Bao Chunlai	21–17, 21–19
Women's singles	(China) Zhang Ning	(Netherlands) Yao Jie	21–14, 21–5
Men's doubles	(Indonesia) Markis Kido & Hendra Setiawan	(China) Cai Yun & Fu Haifeng	21–16, 21–16
Women's doubles	(China) Yang Wei & Zhang Jiewen	(China) Wei Yili & Zhang Yawen	21–17, 21–7
Mixed doubles	(China) Xie Zhongbo & Zhang Yawen	(China) Xu Chen & Zhao Tingting	21–19, 21–5
