= 2007 BWF World Championships =

Badminton championships

Tournament details
- Dates: 13–19 August
- Edition: 16th
- Level: International
- Venue: Putra Indoor Stadium
- Location: Kuala Lumpur, Malaysia

The 2007 BWF World Championships was the 16th tournament of BWF World Championships (World Badminton Championships). It was held in Kuala Lumpur, Malaysia, from 13 to 19 August 2007.

== Host city selection ==
Aarhus and Kuala Lumpur were the candidates for hosting the championships. Kuala Lumpur was later announced as the host during 2005 IBF council meeting in Beijing. China also expressed interest, but ultimately did not bid.

== Venue ==
- Putra Indoor Stadium, Bukit Jalil

== Participating nations ==
A total of 55 countries qualified to participating in this tournament. Below is the list of countries with the parentheses indicates the number of players eligible.

- Algeria (1)
- Australia (4)
- Austria (3)
- Belgium (3)
- Belarus (1)
- Brazil (4)
- Bulgaria (10)
- Canada (12)
- China (24)
- Czech Republic (4)
- Denmark (15)
- Egypt (2)
- England (18)
- Spain (4)
- Estonia (2)
- Finland (3)
- France (9)
- Germany (13)
- Guatemala (2)
- Hong Kong (10)
- Indonesia (21)
- India (8)
- Ireland (3)
- Iran (1)
- Iceland (1)
- Italy (4)
- Japan (15)
- Kenya (2)
- South Korea (13)
- Lithuania (1)
- Malaysia (26)
- Mongolia (2)
- Mauritius (1)
- Netherlands (10)
- New Zealand (6)
- Peru (3)
- Philippines (6)
- Poland (5)
- Portugal (3)
- Romania (3)
- South Africa (4)
- Russia (9)
- Scotland (5)
- Seychelles (2)
- Singapore (10)
- Slovenia (5)
- Sri Lanka (4)
- Switzerland (5)
- Slovakia (1)
- Sweden (3)
- Chinese Taipei (5)
- Ukraine (4)
- United States (11)
- Vietnam (1)
- Wales (1)

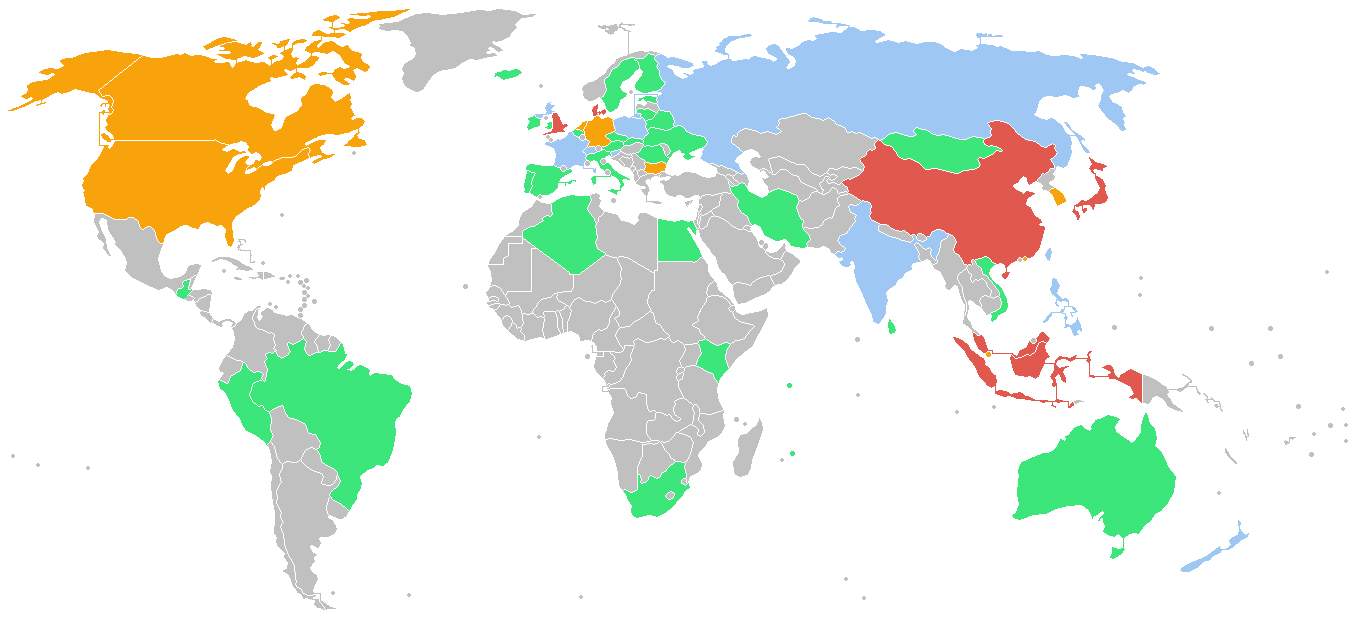
Participating nations. Green: fewer than 5 players; blue: 5–9; orange: 10–14; red: 15 or more.

Notable is, Thailand is the only country announced the withdrawal from the tournament by choosing to attend the World University Games, the event which clash with the Championships, they have several players who qualified for this tournament.

== Medalists ==
=== Medal table ===
* Host nation (Malaysia)

Rank	Nation	Gold	Silver	Bronze	Total
1	China	3	2	6	11
2	Indonesia	2	1	1	4
3	Hong Kong	0	1	0	1
3	South Korea	0	1	0	1
5	Japan	0	0	2	2
6	Malaysia*	0	0	1	1
Totals (6 entries)		5	5	10	20

=== Events ===
Event	Gold	Silver	Bronze
Men's singles	(China) Lin Dan	(Indonesia) Sony Dwi Kuncoro	(China) Bao Chunlai
Men's singles	(China) Lin Dan	(Indonesia) Sony Dwi Kuncoro	(China) Chen Yu
Women's singles	(China) Zhu Lin	(Hong Kong) Wang Chen	(China) Zhang Ning
Women's singles	(China) Zhu Lin	(Hong Kong) Wang Chen	(China) Lu Lan
Men's doubles	(Indonesia) Markis Kido (Indonesia) Hendra Setiawan	(South Korea) Jung Jae-sung (South Korea) Lee Yong-dae	(Malaysia) Choong Tan Fook (Malaysia) Lee Wan Wah
Men's doubles	(Indonesia) Markis Kido (Indonesia) Hendra Setiawan	(South Korea) Jung Jae-sung (South Korea) Lee Yong-dae	(Japan) Shuichi Sakamoto (Japan) Shintaro Ikeda
Women's doubles	(China) Yang Wei (China) Zhang Jiewen	(China) Gao Ling (China) Huang Sui	(China) Zhang Yawen (China) Wei Yili
Women's doubles	(China) Yang Wei (China) Zhang Jiewen	(China) Gao Ling (China) Huang Sui	(Japan) Kumiko Ogura (Japan) Reiko Shiota
Mixed doubles	(Indonesia) Nova Widianto (Indonesia) Liliyana Natsir	(China) Zheng Bo (China) Gao Ling	(Indonesia) Flandy Limpele (Indonesia) Vita Marissa
Mixed doubles	(Indonesia) Nova Widianto (Indonesia) Liliyana Natsir	(China) Zheng Bo (China) Gao Ling	(China) Xie Zhongbo (China) Zhang Yawen
