= Simon Maunoury =

French badminton player (born 1983)

Personal information
- Born: 24 November 1983 (age 42)

Sport
- Country: France
- Sport: Badminton

Men's singles
- Highest ranking: 74 (9 September 2010)
- BWF profile

Simon Maunoury (born 24 November 1983) is a French badminton player. He won the men's singles title at the French National Badminton Championships in 2006 and 2007.

== Achievements ==
=== BWF International Challenge/Series ===
Men's singles
Year	Tournament	Opponent	Score	Result
2005	Latvia Riga International	(Lithuania) Kęstutis Navickas	15–7, 15–7	(gold) Winner
2009	Cyprus International	(Spain) Ernesto Velázquez	21–16, 21–13	(gold) Winner
2010	Cyprus International	(Denmark) Viktor Axelsen	10–21, 11–21	(silver) Runner-up

BWF International Challenge tournament
BWF International Series tournament
BWF Future Series tournament
