= Chen Yu (badminton) =

Chinese badminton player

Chen Yu 陈郁
Personal information
- Born: 8 May 1980 (age 46) Nanning, China
- Height: 1.82 m (6 ft 0 in)
- Weight: 70 kg (154 lb)

Sport
- Country: China
- Sport: Badminton
- Handedness: Right
- Event: Men's singles
Medal record
Men's badminton
Representing China
World Championships
Bronze medal – third place	2007 Kuala Lumpur	Men's singles
World Cup
Silver medal – second place	2006 Yiyang	Men's singles
Sudirman Cup
Silver medal – second place	2003 Eindhoven	Mixed team
Thomas Cup
Gold medal – first place	2004 Jakarta	Men's team
Gold medal – first place	2008 Jakarta	Men's team
Asian Championships
Bronze medal – third place	2006 Johor Bahru	Men's singles
Asia Cup
Gold medal – first place	2001 Singapore	Men's team
World Junior Championships
Bronze medal – third place	1998 Melbourne	Boys' singles
Asian Junior Championships
Gold medal – first place	1998 Kuala Lumpur	Boys' team
Gold medal – first place	1999 Yangon	Boys' doubles
Silver medal – second place	1999 Yangon	Boys' team
Bronze medal – third place	1998 Kuala Lumpur	Mixed doubles

Chen Yu
- Traditional Chinese: 陳郁
- Simplified Chinese: 陈郁
Transcriptions
Standard Mandarin
- Hanyu Pinyin: Chén Yù

Chen Yu (born 8 May 1980) is a former Chinese badminton player from Nanning, Guangxi.

== Career ==
Chen had joined the Guangxi team in 1993, and was selected to join the national team in 1998. Chen won the men's singles title at the Chinese National Championships in 2002 and 2003. On the international badminton circuit he won the 2006 Thailand Open by defeating two fellow countrymen (and two fellow "Chens"), Chen Hong in the semifinals, and Chen Jin in a very close final. Outside of that victory he has had trouble breaking through, but has been runner-up in the Denmark (2003, 2006), Singapore (2003, 2007), and German Opens (2007), and at the prestigious All-England Championships in 2007. He was also part of the national men's team that won the 2001 Asia Cup, and at the Thomas Cup in 2004 and 2008. Chen Yu received an award during a ceremony to mark his retirement with five other teammates from the Chinese national badminton team on the sidelines of the China Open badminton event in Shanghai, November 23, 2008. The then 27-year-old veteran would become a coach of the national Chinese men's team.

== Achievements ==
=== World Championships ===
Men's singles
Year	Venue	Opponent	Score	Result
2007	Putra Indoor Stadium; Kuala Lumpur, Malaysia	(Indonesia) Sony Dwi Kuncoro	21–18, 13–21, 15–21	Bronze

=== World Cup ===
Men's singles
Year	Venue	Opponent	Score	Result
2006	Olympic Park; Yiyang, China	(China) Lin Dan	19–21, 21–19, 17–21	Silver

=== Asian Championships ===
Men's singles
Year	Venue	Opponent	Score	Result
2006	Bandaraya Stadium; Johor Bahru, Malaysia	(Thailand) Boonsak Ponsana	22–24, 13–21	Bronze

=== World Junior Championships ===
Boys' singles
Year	Venue	Opponent	Score	Result
1998	Sports and Aquatic Centre; Melbourne, Australia	(Malaysia) Yeoh Kay Bin	12–15, 12–15	Bronze

=== Asian Junior Championships ===
Boys' doubles
Year	Venue	Partner	Opponent	Score	Result
1999	National Indoor Stadium – 1 Yangon, Myanmar	(China) Sang Yang	(Indonesia) Hendri Kurniawan Saputra (Indonesia) Wandri Kurniawan Saputra	15–6, 15–2	Gold

Mixed doubles
Year	Venue	Partner	Opponent	Score	Result
1998	Kuala Lumpur Badminton Stadium; Kuala Lumpur, Malaysia	(China) Jin Beilei	(Malaysia) Chan Chong Ming (Malaysia) Joanne Quay	5–15, 5–15	Bronze

=== BWF Superseries ===
The BWF Superseries, launched on 14 December 2006 and implemented in 2007, is a series of elite badminton tournaments, sanctioned by Badminton World Federation (BWF). BWF Superseries has two level such as Superseries and Superseries Premier. A season of Superseries features twelve tournaments around the world, which introduced since 2011, with successful players invited to the Superseries Finals held at the year end.

Men's singles
Year	Tournament	Opponent	Score	Result
2007	Singapore Open	(Thailand) Boonsak Ponsana	17–21, 14–21	(silver) Runner-up
2007	All England Open	(China) Lin Dan	13–21, 12–21	(silver) Runner-up

BWF Super Series Finals tournament
BWF Super Series Premier tournament
BWF Super Series tournament

=== BWF Grand Prix ===
The BWF Grand Prix has two levels: Grand Prix and Grand Prix Gold. It is a series of badminton tournaments, sanctioned by Badminton World Federation (BWF) since 2007. The World Badminton Grand Prix sanctioned by International Badminton Federation (IBF) since 1983.

Men's singles
Year	Tournament	Opponent	Score	Result
2007	German Open	(China) Lin Dan	Walkover	(silver) Runner-up
2006	Denmark Open	(China) Chen Hong	18–21, 18–21	(silver) Runner-up
2006	Thailand Open	(China) Chen Jin	21–17, 21–23, 22–20	(gold) Winner
2003	Denmark Open	(China) Lin Dan	4–15, 6–15	(silver) Runner-up
2003	Singapore Open	(China) Chen Hong	15–11, 8–15, 4–15	(silver) Runner-up
