= Bobby Milroy =

Canadian badminton player (born 1978)

Personal information
- Born: Robert William James Milroy; October 9, 1978 (age 47) Edmonton, Alberta

Sport
- Country: Canada
- Sport: Badminton

Men's singles
- Highest ranking: 18 (October 13, 2005)
- Current ranking: 37 (October 11, 2007)
- BWF profile

Robert William James "Bobby" Milroy (born October 9, 1978) is a male badminton player, coach, businessman and spokesman from Canada.

== Career ==
Bobby Milroy won the men's singles at the 1996 Canadian National Junior Championships. Since 1997, Milroy has won two gold medals, three silver medals and five bronze medals at the Canadian National Championships. Bobby Milroy has won 7 international championships, including the 2002 Swiss Open, 2002 Czech International, 2003 Iceland International, 2005 Hungarian International, 2005 Iceland International, 2006 Peru International, 2008 Pakistan International. He has made an additional 9 finals in international competition between 1999–2009. He maintained a world ranking within the top 20 from October 13, 2005, until March 30, 2006.

Milroy has represented the Canadian National Badminton team since 1998 and has competed in the 1998, 2002 and 2006 CommonWealth Games. He has also competed in 4 World Championships.

== President of the World Badminton Players Federation ==
Bobby Milroy was elected President of the World Badminton Player's Federation (BPF) in 2003 at the world championships in Birmingham. During his Administration, the Badminton World Federation (BWF) created the SuperSeries Tour, implemented a policy of equal prize money for men and women, and awarded the players voting rights within the BWF. In September, 2007 the Canadian Olympic Committee awarded Milroy the 2007 AthletesCan Leadership Award for his accomplishments as President of the BPF. Bobby Milroy was the keynote speaker at the 2007 AthletesCan Forum, in Whitehorse, Canada and a guest speaker at the 2008 IOC Women in Sport Forum, in Jordan. Bobby Milroy served as Chairman of Pedro Yang's election campaign for the IOC Athletes Commission at the 2008 Beijing Olympics. He was succeeded by Kaveh Mehrabi.

== President of ClearOne Sports Ltd. ==
Bobby Milroy was President of ClearOne Sports Ltd. from May 2009 – September 2011. During this time, the company expanded the ClearOne Badminton operation from two training centres in Richmond BC to additional locations in Port Coquitlam, Calgary, Alberta and Orlando, Florida. He was a co-founder with Darryl Yung of the ClearOne Badminton Academy (COBA) which trained and produced some of Canada's 2012 Olympic hopefuls and top juniors. He served as Chairman of the 2010 and 2011 Canada Open Badminton event at the Richmond Olympic Oval, which was attended by over 250 players from 45 countries. The event was the first Canadian tournament to attract Olympic and World Champions such as Taufik Hidayat, Lee Yong Dae, Zhu Lin and Tony Gunawan. The 2011 edition of the event was broadcast on SHAW TV and throughout Asia.
