= Badminton at the 2004 Summer Olympics – Men's singles =

Men's singles at the Games of the XXVIII Olympiad
- Venue: Goudi Olympic Hall
- Date: 14–21 August 2004
- Competitors: 32 from 21 nations

Medalists
1st place, gold medalist(s)		Taufik Hidayat	Indonesia
2nd place, silver medalist(s)		Shon Seung-mo	South Korea
3rd place, bronze medalist(s)		Sony Dwi Kuncoro	Indonesia

These are the results of the men's singles competition in badminton at the 2004 Summer Olympics in Athens.

The tournament consisted of a single-elimination tournament. Matches were played using a best-of-three games format. Games were played to 15 points, using the old scoring system. Each game had to be won by a margin of two points.

The top eight seeds in the tournament were placed in the bracket so as not to face each other until the quarterfinals. All other competitors were placed by draw.

== Seeds ==
1. Lin Dan (CHN) (round of 32)
2. Chen Hong (CHN) (quarter-finals)
3. Wong Choong Hann (MAS) (round of 16)
4. Bao Chunlai (CHN) (round of 16)
5. Lee Hyun-il (KOR) (round of 16)
6. Peter Gade (DEN) (quarter-finals)
7. Shon Seung-Mo (KOR) (silver medallist)
8. Sony Dwi Kuncoro (INA) (bronze medallist)

== Draw ==
Round of 32
Ronald Susilo (SIN)	15	15
Lin Dan (CHN)	12	10
Björn Joppien (GER)	14	15	15
Kasperi Salo (FIN)	17	7	11
Lee Hyun-il (KOR)	15	15
Stuart Brehaut (AUS)	3	2
Boonsak Ponsana (THA)	15	15
Chris Dednam (RSA)	1	10
Wong Choong Hann (MAS)	15	15
Przemysław Wacha (POL)	1	5
Taufik Hidayat (INA)	15	15
Hidetaka Yamada (JPN)	8	10
Peter Gade (DEN)	15	15
Chien Yu-Hsiu (TPE)	6	1
Nikhil Kanetkar (IND)	15	13	15
Sergio Llopis (ESP)	7	15	13
Jim Ronny Andersen (NOR)	15	8	15
Pedro Yang (GUA)	9	15	13
Sony Dwi Kuncoro (INA)	15	9	15
Roslin Hashim (MAS)	6	15	8
Park Tae-sang (KOR)	15	15
Abhinn Shyam Gupta (IND)	12	0
Bao Chunlai (CHN)	15	15
Shōji Satō (JPN)	6	5
Richard Vaughan (GBR)	15	15
Marco Vasconcelos (POR)	5	5
Shon Seung-mo (KOR)	15	15
Antti Viitikko (FIN)	12	3
Lee Chong Wei (MAS)	15	15
Ng Wei (HKG)	3	13
Chen Hong (CHN)	12	15	15
Kenneth Jonassen (DEN)	15	5	9

Round of 16
Susilo (SIN)	15	15
Joppien (GER)	11	6
Lee (KOR)	13	11
Ponsana (THA)	15	15
Wong (MAS)	15	7	9
Hidayat (INA)	11	15	15
Gade (DEN)	15	15
Kanetkar (IND)	10	6
Andersen (NOR)	7	6
Kuncoro (INA)	15	15
Park (KOR)	15	15
Bao (CHN)	11	12
Vaughan (GBR)	9	4
Shon (KOR)	15	15
Lee (MAS)	11	15	12
Chen (CHN)	15	3	15

Quarter-finals
Susilo (SIN)	10	1
Ponsana (THA)	15	15
Hidayat (INA)	15	15
Gade (DEN)	12	12
Kuncoro (INA)	15	15
Park (KOR)	13	4
Shon (KOR)	10	15	15
Chen (CHN)	15	4	10

Semifinals
Ponsana (THA)	9	2
Hidayat (INA)	15	15
Kuncoro (INA)	6	15	9
Shon (KOR)	15	9	15

Final
Hidayat (INA)	15	15
Shon (KOR)	8	7
Third place
Kuncoro (INA)	15	17
Ponsana (THA)	11	16

== Sources ==
- Men's singles draws and results - InternationalBadminton.org
