= 2005 IBF World Championships – Men's singles =

Badminton tournament results

Men's singles at the 2005 IBF World Championships
- Venue: Arrowhead Pond
- Location: Anaheim, United States
- Dates: August 15, 2005 – August 21, 2005

Medalists
gold medal	Taufik Hidayat	Indonesia
silver medal	Lin Dan	China
bronze medal	Peter Gade	Denmark
bronze medal	Lee Chong Wei	Malaysia

The 2005 IBF World Championships (World Badminton Championships) took place in Arrowhead Pond in Anaheim, United States, between August 15 and August 21, 2005. Following the results in the men's singles.

== Seeds ==
1. (China) Lin Dan, Runner-up
2. (Denmark) Kenneth Jonassen, Quarter-final
3. (Denmark) Peter Gade, Semi-final
4. (China) Bao Chunlai, Quarter-final
5. (Malaysia) Lee Chong Wei, Semi-final
6. (Indonesia) Taufik Hidayat, Champion
7. (China) Chen Hong, Quarter-final
8. (Malaysia) Muhammad Hafiz Hashim, Third round
9. (Hong Kong) Ng Wei, Third round
10. (Malaysia) Wong Choong Hann, Third round
11. (Thailand) Boonsak Ponsana, Third round
12. (Denmark) Niels Christian Kaldau, Second round
13. (South Korea) Lee Hyun-il, Quarter-final
14. (Netherlands) Dicky Palyama, First round
15. n/a
16. (Germany) Björn Joppien, Third round

== Main stage ==
=== Section 1 ===
First round
(China) Lin Dan
Bye
(Philippines) Kennevic Asuncion	17	5	17
(England) Andrew Smith	14	15	15
(Japan) Shoji Sato	15	15
(Netherlands) Dicky Palyama	10	8
(Sweden) Rasmus Wengberg	15	17
(Czech Republic) Jan Vondra	7	16
(Malaysia) Muhammad Hafiz Hashim	15	15
(Iran) Kaveh Mehrabi	3	3
(France) Olivier Fossy	9	3
(Singapore) Ronald Susilo	15	13	Aufg.
(South Korea) Lee Hyun-il	15	15
(Norway) Jim Ronny Andersen	3	7
(Finland) Ville Lang	13	15	15
(Ukraine) Vladislav Druzchenko	15	9	6

Second round
(China) Lin Dan	15	15
(Philippines) Kennevic Asuncion	1	3
(Japan) Shoji Sato	15	15	15
(Sweden) Rasmus Wengberg	17	7	3
(Malaysia) Muhammad Hafiz Hashim	o.K.
(France) Olivier Fossy
(South Korea) Lee Hyun-il	15	15
(Finland) Ville Lang	2	11

Third round
(China) Lin Dan	15	9	15
(Japan) Shoji Sato	8	15	5
(Malaysia) Muhammad Hafiz Hashim	11	5
(South Korea) Lee Hyun-il	15	15

Quarterfinals
5	(China) Lin Dan	5	15	15
(South Korea) Lee Hyun-il	15	7	8

=== Section 2 ===
First round
(Denmark) Peter Gade	15	15
(Guatemala) Pedro Yang	0	1
(Vietnam) Nguyen Tien Minh	15	17
(Germany) Marc Zwiebler	13	16
(Denmark) Niels Christian Kaldau	15	15
(Sri Lanka) Niluka Karunaratne	6	7
(Indonesia) Sony Dwi Kuncoro	15	15
(Scotland) Craig Goddard	1	1
(China) Chen Hong	17	15
(Poland) Przemyslaw Wacha	14	2
(Thailand) Poompat Sapkulchananart	15	9	15
(United States) Raju Rai	7	15	12
(Hong Kong) Ng Wei	15	15
(New Zealand) John Moody	12	4
(Canada) Andrew Dabeka	9	15	15
(United States) Eric Go	15	3	1

Second round
(Denmark) Peter Gade	15	15
(Vietnam) Nguyen Tien Minh	4	6
(Denmark) Niels Christian Kaldau	15	9	4
(Indonesia) Sony Dwi Kuncoro	9	15	15
(China) Chen Hong	15	14	15
(Thailand) Poompat Sapkulchananart	9	17	12
(Hong Kong) Ng Wei	15	15
(Canada) Andrew Dabeka	9	7

Third round
(Denmark) Peter Gade	15	15
(Indonesia) Sony Dwi Kuncoro	11	10
(China) Chen Hong	15	14	15
(Hong Kong) Ng Wei	7	17	3

Quarterfinals
5	(Denmark) Peter Gade	15	15
(China) Chen Hong	13	4

=== Section 3 ===
First round
(Austria) Jürgen Koch	15	15
(Republic of Ireland) Scott Evans	12	7
(Germany) Björn Joppien	15	15
(Lithuania) Kestutis Navickas	9	12
(Wales) Martyn Lewis	6	15	15
(South Africa) Chris Dednam	15	2	13
(Malaysia) Lee Chong Wei	15	15
(Czech Republic) Jan Fröhlich	10	0
(Chinese Taipei) Liao Sheng-Shiun	15	15
(Slovenia) Miha Sepec Jr.	9	7
(Malaysia) Wong Choong Hann	15	15
(New Zealand) Geoffrey Bellingham	1	5
(Hong Kong) Hariyanto Agus	15	15
(Japan) Yuichi Ikeda	2	5
(Canada) Bobby Milroy	1	6
(China) Bao Chunlai	15	15

Second round
(Austria) Jürgen Koch	5	9
(Germany) Björn Joppien	15	15
(Wales) Martyn Lewis	1	4
(Malaysia) Lee Chong Wei	15	15
(Chinese Taipei) Liao Sheng-Shiun	4	0
(Malaysia) Wong Choong Hann	15	15
(Hong Kong) Hariyanto Agus	7	4
(China) Bao Chunlai	15	15

Third round
(Germany) Björn Joppien	4	3
(Malaysia) Lee Chong Wei	15	15
(Malaysia) Wong Choong Hann	6	12
(China) Bao Chunlai	15	15

Quarterfinals
5	(Malaysia) Lee Chong Wei	15	15
(China) Bao Chunlai	5	7

=== Section 4 ===
First round
(Sweden) Hugi Heimersson	15	15
(Spain) Carlos Longo	8	5
(Thailand) Boonsak Ponsana	15	15
(India) Arvind Bhat	6	9
(Netherlands) Eric Pang	15	15
(Israel) Shai Geffen	9	2
(Indonesia) Taufik Hidayat	15	15
(Peru) Rodrigo Pacheco	7	3
(England) Aamir Ghaffar	15	15
(Guatemala) Erick Anguiano	6	0
(South Korea) Shon Seung-mo	15	15
(United States) Marc Lai	3	0
(Singapore) Kendrick Lee Yen Hui	15	15
(France) Erwin Kehlhoffner	3	4
Bye
(Denmark) Kenneth Jonassen

Second round
(Sweden) Hugi Heimersson	2	4
(Thailand) Boonsak Ponsana	15	15
(Netherlands) Eric Pang	5	6
(Indonesia) Taufik Hidayat	15	15
(England) Aamir Ghaffar	15	15
(South Korea) Shon Seung-mo	1	7
(Singapore) Kendrick Lee Yen Hui	2	2
(Denmark) Kenneth Jonassen	15	15

Third round
(Thailand) Boonsak Ponsana	9	17	10
(Indonesia) Taufik Hidayat	15	15	15
(England) Aamir Ghaffar	2	4
(Denmark) Kenneth Jonassen	15	15

Quarterfinals
5	(Indonesia) Taufik Hidayat	3	15	15
(Denmark) Kenneth Jonassen	15	10	7

== Final stage ==
Quarterfinals
1	(China) Lin Dan	5	15	15
13	(South Korea) Lee Hyun-il	15	7	8
3	(Denmark) Peter Gade	15	15	0
7	(China) Chen Hong	13	4
5	(Malaysia) Lee Chong Wei	15	15
4	(China) Bao Chunlai	5	7
6	(Indonesia) Taufik Hidayat	3	15	15
2	(Denmark) Kenneth Jonassen	15	10	7

Semifinals
1	(China) Lin Dan	15	13	15
4	(Denmark) Peter Gade	9	15	11
5	(Malaysia) Lee Chong Wei	3	12
6	(Indonesia) Taufik Hidayat	15	15

Finals
1	(China) Lin Dan	3	7
6	(Indonesia) Taufik Hidayat	15	15
