= 2001 IBF World Championships – Men's singles =

Badminton championships

Men's singles at the 2001 IBF World Championships
- Venue: Palacio de Deportes de San Pablo
- Location: Seville, Spain
- Dates: June 3, 2001 – June 10, 2001

Medalists
| gold medal | Hendrawan | Indonesia |
| silver medal | Peter Gade | Denmark |
| bronze medal | Taufik Hidayat | Indonesia |
| bronze medal | Chen Hong | China |

The 12th IBF World Championships, also known as the World Badminton Championships, were held in the Palacio de Deportes de San Pablo, Seville, Spain, between 3 June and 10 June 2001. Following the results of the men's singles.

== Seeds ==
1. (Malaysia) Muhammad Roslin Hashim
2. (Denmark) Peter Gade
3. (Indonesia) Taufik Hidayat
4. (China) Chen Hong
5. (South Korea) Lee Hyun-il
6. (India) Pullela Gopichand
7. (Indonesia) Marleve Mainaky
8. (Denmark) Anders Boesen
9. (China) Xia Xuanze
10. (Taiwan) Fung Permadi
11. (China) Ji Xinpeng
12. (Malaysia) Ong Ewe Hock
13. (Denmark) Kenneth Jonassen
14. (Indonesia) Hendrawan

== Main stage ==
=== Section 1 ===
First round
(Malaysia) Muhammad Roslin Hashim | 17 | 15
(India) Abhinn Shyam Gupta | 15 | 5
(Hong Kong) Tam Kai Chuen | 15 | 15
(France) Nabil Lasmari | 4 | 13
(Indonesia) Hendrawan | 15 | 13 | 15
(Japan) Kazuhiro Shimogami | 4 | 15 | 10
(Canada) Andrew Dabeka | 12 | 4
(Sweden) Rasmus Wengberg | 15 | 15
(Denmark) Anders Boesen | 15 | 15
(Thailand) Anupap Thiraratsakul | 9 | 10
(Portugal) Marco Vasconcelos | 8 | 4
(England) Mark Constable | 15 | 15
(China) Xia Xuanze | 15 | 15 | 15
(Ukraine) Vladislav Druzchenko | 10 | 17 | 10
(Germany) Conrad Hückstaedt | 15 | 15
(New Zealand) Nicholas M. Hall | 10 | 11

Second round
(Malaysia) Muhammad Roslin Hashim | 10 | 8
(Hong Kong) Tam Kai Chuen | 15 | 15
(Indonesia) Hendrawan | 15 | 15
(Sweden) Rasmus Wengberg | 13 | 12
(Denmark) Anders Boesen | 17 | 15
(England) Mark Constable | 15 | 7
(China) Xia Xuanze | 15 | 15
(Germany) Conrad Hückstaedt | 8 | 9

Third round
(Hong Kong) Tam Kai Chuen | 3 | 12
(Indonesia) Hendrawan | 15 | 15
(Denmark) Anders Boesen | 15 | 10 | 10
(China) Xia Xuanze | 7 | 15 | 15

Quarterfinals
(Indonesia) Hendrawan | 15 | 15
(China) Xia Xuanze | 7 | 5

=== Section 2 ===
First round
(Indonesia) Taufik Hidayat | 15 | 15
(Netherlands) Dicky Palyama | 8 | 4
(Czech Republic) Jan Fröhlich | 9 | 4
(Singapore) Ronald Susilo | 15 | 15
(Wales) Richard Vaughan | 10 | 7
(China) Chen Yu | 15 | 15
(Malaysia) Wong Choong Hann | 15 | 15
(Spain) Arturo Ruiz | 7 | 8
(South Korea) Lee Hyun-il | 15 | 15
(Germany) Björn Joppien | 6 | 7
(Japan) Hidetaka Yamada | 15 | 15
(Belgium) Ruud Kuijten | 9 | 2
(Denmark) Kenneth Jonassen | 15 | 15
(Slovenia) Andrej Pohar | 1 | 4
(Sweden) Daniel Eriksson | 16 | 15 | 17
(England) Andrew South | 17 | 10 | 14

Second round
(Indonesia) Taufik Hidayat | 15 | 15
(Singapore) Ronald Susilo | 12 | 12
(China) Chen Yu | 12 | 13
(Malaysia) Wong Choong Hann | 15 | 15
(South Korea) Lee Hyun-il | 15 | 15
(Japan) Hidetaka Yamada | 5 | 13
(Denmark) Kenneth Jonassen | 15 | 15
(Sweden) Daniel Eriksson | 6 | 5

Third round
(Indonesia) Taufik Hidayat | 15 | 11 | 15
(Malaysia) Wong Choong Hann | 10 | 15 | 7
(South Korea) Lee Hyun-il | 15 | 15
(Denmark) Kenneth Jonassen | 6 | 11

Quarterfinals
(Indonesia) Taufik Hidayat | 15 | 4 | 15
(South Korea) Lee Hyun-il | 12 | 15 | 5

=== Section 3 ===
First round
(Taiwan) Fung Permadi | 15 | 15
(Japan) Yousuke Nakanishi | 11 | 7
(France) Bertrand Gallet | 17 | 8 | 15
(Sweden) George Rimcardi | 14 | 15 | 7
(United States) Kevin Han | 8 | 15 | 15
(Indonesia) Johan Hadikusuma | 15 | 12 | 4
(Germany) Jens Roch | 3 | 8
(India) Pullela Gopichand | 15 | 15
(England) Michael Edge | 7 | 13
(South Korea) Park Tae-sang | 15 | 15
(Denmark) Kasper Oedum | 2 | 13
(Malaysia) Ong Ewe Hock | 15 | 15
(Singapore) Indra Wijaya | 17 | 15
(Taiwan) Lu Feng-Chieh | 15 | 11
(Netherlands) Tjitte Weistra | 7 | 9
(China) Chen Hong | 15 | 15

Second round
(Taiwan) Fung Permadi | 15 | 15
(France) Bertrand Gallet | 9 | 2
(United States) Kevin Han | 6 | 15 | 7
(India) Pullela Gopichand | 15 | 11 | 15
(South Korea) Park Tae-sang | 11 | 9
(Malaysia) Ong Ewe Hock | 15 | 15
(Singapore) Indra Wijaya | 4 | 8
(China) Chen Hong | 15 | 15

Third round
(Taiwan) Fung Permadi | 10 | 13
(India) Pullela Gopichand | 15 | 15
(Malaysia) Ong Ewe Hock | 14 | 10
(China) Chen Hong | 17 | 15

Quarterfinals
(India) Pullela Gopichand | 10 | 10
(China) Chen Hong | 15 | 15

=== Section 4 ===
First round
(Indonesia) Agus Hariyanto | 15 | 15
(Japan) Shinya Ohtsuka | 2 | 4
(Netherlands) Rune Massing | 6 | 4
(China) Ji Xinpeng | 15 | 15
(Thailand) Boonsak Ponsana | 15 | 15
(Poland) Przemyslaw Wacha | 5 | 8
(England) Colin Haughton | 15 | 11 | 0
(Indonesia) Marleve Mainaky | 13 | 15 | 15
(Norway) Jim Ronny Andersen | 15 | 15
(New Zealand) Geoffrey R. Bellingham | 10 | 12
(Malaysia) Lee Tsuen Seng | 10 | 17 | 15
(South Korea) Shon Seung-mo | 15 | 16 | 7
(Sweden) Martin Hagberg | 15 | 15
(Austria) Jürgen Koch | 4 | 8
(Germany) Oliver Pongratz | 10 | 13
(Denmark) Peter Gade | 15 | 15

Second round
(Indonesia) Agus Hariyanto | 12 | 15 | 15
(China) Ji Xinpeng | 15 | 11 | 4
(Thailand) Boonsak Ponsana | 8 | 15 | 11
(Indonesia) Marleve Mainaky | 15 | 10 | 15
(Norway) Jim Ronny Andersen | 10 | 15 | 0
(Malaysia) Lee Tsuen Seng | 15 | 12 | 15
(Sweden) Martin Hagberg | 7 | 1
(Denmark) Peter Gade | 15 | 15

Third round
(Indonesia) Agus Hariyanto | 7 | 15 | 15
(Indonesia) Marleve Mainaky | 15 | 7 | 5
(Malaysia) Lee Tsuen Seng | 3 | 15 | 9
(Denmark) Peter Gade | 15 | 7 | 15

Quarterfinals
(Indonesia) Agus Hariyanto | 4 | 8
(Denmark) Peter Gade | 15 | 15

== Final stage ==
Quarterfinals
(Indonesia) Hendrawan | 15 | 15
(China) Xia Xuanze | 7 | 5
(Indonesia) Taufik Hidayat | 15 | 4 | 15
(South Korea) Lee Hyun-il | 12 | 15 | 5
(India) Pullela Gopichand | 10 | 10
(China) Chen Hong | 15 | 15
(Indonesia) Agus Hariyanto | 4 | 8
(Denmark) Peter Gade | 15 | 15

Semifinals
(Indonesia) Hendrawan | 11 | 15 | 1
(Indonesia) Taufik Hidayat | 15 | 5 | 7^{r}
(China) Chen Hong | 14 | 2
(Denmark) Peter Gade | 17 | 15

Finals
(Indonesia) Hendrawan | 15 | 17
(Denmark) Peter Gade | 6 | 16
