= 2002 All England Open Badminton Championships =

2002 All England Championships
Tournament details
- Dates: 5 March 2002– 9 March 2002
- Edition: 92nd
- Location: Birmingham

The 2002 Yonex All England Open was the 92nd edition of the All England Open Badminton Championships. It was held from 5 to 9 March 2002, in Birmingham, England. The scoring system changed to the first player to reach seven points over five sets. This change was brought in for the benefit of the viewing public and television cameras but it proved to be unpopular and soon reverted to the original scoring system.

It was a four star tournament and the prize money was US$125,000.

== Venue ==
- National Indoor Arena

== Final results ==
Category	Winners	Runners-up	Score
Men's singles	(China) Chen Hong	(Indonesia) Budi Santoso	7–4, 7–5, 7–1
Women's singles	(Denmark) Camilla Martin	(China) Gong Ruina	7–5, 8–6, 7–3
Men's doubles	(South Korea) Ha Tae-kwon & Kim Dong-moon	(Indonesia) Eng Hian & Flandy Limpele	7–2, 7–2, 1–7, 7–3
Women's doubles	(China) Gao Ling & Huang Sui	(China) Zhang Jiewen & Wei Yili	7–3, 7–5, 8–7
Mixed doubles	(South Korea) Kim Dong-moon & Ra Kyung-min	(Denmark) Jens Eriksen & Mette Schjoldager	7–3, 7–3, 7–0

== Men's singles ==
=== Section 1 ===
First round
(China) Chen Hong	7	3	8	7
(Indonesia) Ronald Susilo	0	7	6	5
(Germany) Björn Joppien	8	7	2	7	2
(Japan) Keita Masuda	7	4	7	8	0 ret
(China) Luo Yigang	7	2	5	7	8
(South Korea) Lee Hyun-il	5	7	7	2	6
(Malaysia) Muhammad Roslin Hashim	7	7	7
(Sweden) Martin Hagberg	3	5	4
(China) Bao Chunlai	7	7	7
(Denmark) Joachim Fischer Nielsen	1	2	2
(Malaysia) Muhammad Hafiz Hashim	3	7	8	7
(India) Pullela Gopichand	7	1	7	4
(China) Chen Yu	7	7	7
(Malaysia) Ismail Saman	3	1	2
(Wales) Richard Vaughan	8	8	7
(India) Chetan Anand	6	6	0

Second round
(China) Chen Hong	7	6	7	7
(Germany) Joppien	3	8	4	_{3}
(China) Luo Yigang	6	7	7	7
(Malaysia) Roslin	8	4	0	3
(China) Chunlai	7	8	7
(Malaysia) Hafiz Hashim	5	7	2
(China) Chen Yu	7	7	7
(Wales) Vaughan	2	5	2

QF round
(China) Chen Hong	6	7	7	7
(China) _{^{Luo Yigang}}	8	3	4	5
(China) Chunlai	7	7	6	7
(China) Chen Yu	3	4	8	1

SF round
(China) Chen Hong	8	7	7
(China) Chunlai	7	2	5

=== Section 2 ===
First round
(Indonesia) Budi Santoso	7	7	7
(Denmark) Anders Boesen	3	1	3
(China) Wu Yunyong	7	7	1	7
(England) Colin Haughton	5	4	7	0
(Hong Kong) Agus Hariyanto	7	7	4	3	7
(Indonesia) Sony Dwi Kuncoro	5	3	7	7	5
(China) Xia Xuanze	7	7	7
(Japan) Shoji Sato	1	2	4
(China) Lin Dan	7	7	7
(Denmark) Jonas Lyduch	2	0	2
(Indonesia) Rony Agustinus	8	7	7
(South Korea) Park Tae-sang	7	2	0
(South Korea) Shon Seung-mo	7	7	7
(India) Abhinn Shyam Gupta	4	2	0
(Indonesia) Marleve Mainaky	7	7	7
(India) Arvind Bhatt	4	2	0

Second round
(Indonesia) Santoso	7	6	7	7
(China) Yuyong	2	8	1	5
(Hong Kong) Hariyanto	5	2	7	8	8
(China) Xuanze	7	7	2	6	7
(China) Lin Dan	7	7	7
(Indonesia) Agustinus	0	0	2
(South Korea) Seung-mo	7	3	7	7
(Indonesia) Mainaky	2	7	2	1

QF round
(Indonesia) Santoso	7	7	7
(Hong Kong) Hariyanto	3	2	1
(China) Lin Dan	4	7	8	7
(South Korea) Seung-mo	7	4	6	2

½ round
(Indonesia) Santoso	7	7	6	3	7
(China) Lin Dan	5	0	8	7	1

== Women's singles ==
=== Section 1 ===
First round
(Denmark) Camilla Martin	7	7	7
(Malaysia) Sugita Kunalan	2	0	1
(China) Xu Huaiwen	7	7	8
(Japan) Kyoko Komuro	2	1	6
(China) Zhang Ning	7	7	7
(England) Wendy Taylor	0	0	1
(England) Julia Mann	w/o
(Netherlands) Karina de Wit	scr
(China) Dai Yun	7	7	7
(Canada) Denyse Julien	4	0	1
(Wales) Kelly Morgan	7	7	7
(England) Jill Pittard	3	0	2
(China) Wang Chen	w/o
(Japan) Kaori Mori	scr
(South Korea) Lee Kyung-won	1	7	7	7
(Scotland) Susan Hughes	7	5	0	1

Second round
(Denmark) Martin	8	8	7
(China) Huaiwen	7	7	4
(China) Zhang Ning	7	7	7
(England) Mann	3	1	2
(China) Dai Yun	7	7	7
(Wales) Morgan	1	1	3
(China) Wang Chen	8	7	7
(South Korea) Kyun-won	6	5	3

¼ round
(Denmark) Martin	7	1	7	7
(China) Zhang Ning	5	7	4	2
(China) Dai Yun	7	7	7
(China) Wang Chen	2	3	2

½ round
(Denmark) Martin	7	1	7	7
(China) Dai Yun	2	7	4	2

=== Section 2 ===
First round
(China) Gong Ruina	7	7	1	7
(Japan) Kanako Yonekura	3	3	7	3
(Japan) Yoshiko Yonekura
(Germany) Petra Overzier
(China) Xie Xingfang	7	7	7
(China) Hu Ting	1	0	2
(Denmark) Tine Rasmussen	7	7	7
(Italy) Agnese Allegrini	4	5	0
(China) Zhou Mi	7	7	7
(England) Katy Brydon	2	3	0
(Hong Kong) Ling Wan Ting	7	7	6	7
(South Korea) Seo Yoon-hee	4	2	8	4
(South Korea) Kim Kyeung-Ran	7	7	3	7	7
(Netherlands) Yao Jie	1	8	7	0	0
(Germany) Nicole Grether	7	7	7
(England) Justine Willmott	2	3	5

Second round
(China) Ruina	7	7	7
(Japan) Yonekura	2	3	3
(China) Xingfang	7	7	7
(Denmark) Rasmussen	0	0	4
(China) Zhou Mi	7	7	7
(Hong Kong) Ting	5	1	0
(South Korea) Kyeung-Ran	7	7	7
(Germany) Grether	4	2	2

QF round
(China) Ruina	7	7	7
(China) Xingfang	3	3	2
(China) Zhou Mi	7	4	7	7
(South Korea) Kyeung-Ran	1	7	0	0

SF round
(China) Ruina	0	5	7	8	8
(China) Zhou Mi	7	7	3	7	7
