= Badminton at the 2000 Summer Olympics – Men's singles =

Men's singles at the Games of the XXVII Olympiad
- Venue: Pavilion 3, Sydney Olympic Park
- Date: 17 – 23 September 2000
- Competitors: 35 from 22 nations

Medalists
1st place, gold medalist(s)		Ji Xinpeng	China
2nd place, silver medalist(s)		Hendrawan	Indonesia
3rd place, bronze medalist(s)		Xia Xuanze	China

These are the results for the men’s singles badminton tournament of 2000 Summer Olympics. The tournament was single-elimination. Matches consisted of three sets, with sets being to 15 for men's singles. The tournament was held at Pavilion 3, Sydney Olympic Park.

== Seeds ==
1. Taufik Hidayat (INA) (quarterfinals)
2. Hendrawan (INA) (silver medalist)
3. Peter Gade (DEN) (fourth place)
4. Xia Xuanze (CHN) (bronze medalist)
5. Wong Choong Hann (MAS) (quarterfinals)
6. Poul-Erik Høyer Larsen (DEN) (second round)
7. Ji Xinpeng (CHN) (gold medalist)
8. Marleve Mainaky (INA) (quarterfinals)

== Draw ==
=== Finals ===
Quarterfinals
1	Taufik Hidayat (INA)	12	5
7	Ji Xinpeng (CHN)	15	15
3	Peter Gade (DEN)	15	15
8	Marleve Mainaky (INA)	6	6
5	Wong Choong Hann (MAS)	15	11
4	Xia Xuanze (CHN)	17	15
Sun Jun (CHN)	13	5
2	Hendrawan (INA)	15	15

Semifinals
7	Ji Xinpeng (CHN)	15	1	15
3	Peter Gade (DEN)	9	15	9
4	Xia Xuanze (CHN)	12	4
2	Hendrawan (INA)	15	15

Finals
7	Ji Xinpeng (CHN)	15	15
2	Hendrawan (INA)	4	13
Bronze-medal match
4	Xia Xuanze (CHN)	15	15
3	Peter Gade (DEN)	13	5

=== Section 1 ===
First round

Second round
1	Taufik Hidayat (INA)	15	14	15
Hidetaka Yamada (JPN)	5	17	8
Peter Knowles (GBR)	5	15	3
Ong Ewe Hock (MAS)	15	12	15
7	Ji Xinpeng (CHN)	7	15	15
Ng Wei (HKG)	15	4	11
Kevin Han (USA)	15	15
Mike Beres (CAN)	5	3

Third round
1	Taufik Hidayat (INA)	15	13	15
Ong Ewe Hock (MAS)	9	15	3
7	Ji Xinpeng (CHN)	15	15
Kevin Han (USA)	3	6

Quarterfinals
1	Taufik Hidayat (INA)
7	Ji Xinpeng (CHN)

=== Section 2 ===
First round
Bertrand Gallet (FRA)	15	15
Marco Vasconcelos (POR)	7	9

Second round
3	Peter Gade (DEN)	15	15
Denis Constantin (MRI)	3	9
Fung Permadi (TPE)	15	15
Mikhail Popov (BUL)	0	4
8	Marleve Mainaky (INA)	15	17
Tomas Johansson (SWE)	11	16
Hwang Sun-ho (KOR)	15	15
Bertrand Gallet (FRA)	7	12

Third round
3	Peter Gade (DEN)	15	15
Fung Permadi (TPE)	8	7
8	Marleve Mainaky (INA)	15	15
Hwang Sun-ho (KOR)	5	3

Quarterfinals
3	Peter Gade (DEN)
8	Marleve Mainaky (INA)

=== Section 3 ===
First round
Kenneth Jonassen (DEN)	14	15	17
Shon Seung-mo (KOR)	17	8	15

Second round
Kenneth Jonassen (DEN)	15	15
Ruud Kuijten (BEL)	8	5
Jyri Aalto (FIN)	5	12
5	Wong Choong Hann (MAS)	15	15
Rio Suryana (AUS)	8	15	13
Svetoslav Stojanov (BUL)	15	2	15
Keita Masuda (JPN)	4	15	8
4	Xia Xuanze (CHN)	15	12	15

Third round
Kenneth Jonassen (DEN)	6	7
5	Wong Choong Hann (MAS)	15	15
Svetoslav Stojanov (BUL)	11	2
4	Xia Xuanze (CHN)	15	15

Quarterfinals
5	Wong Choong Hann (MAS)
4	Xia Xuanze (CHN)

=== Section 4 ===
First round
Richard Vaughan (GBR)	15	15
Boonsak Ponsana (THA)	8	12

Second round
Richard Vaughan (GBR)	15	15
Rasmus Wengberg (SWE)	8	4
Sun Jun (CHN)	15	16	15
6	Poul-Erik Høyer Larsen (DEN)	3	17	10
Pullela Gopichand (IND)	15	10	15
Vladislav Druzchenko (UKR)	3	15	7
Tam Kai Chuen (HKG)	7	7
2	Hendrawan (INA)	15	15

Third round
Richard Vaughan (GBR)	10	8
Sun Jun (CHN)	15	15
Pullela Gopichand (IND)	9	4
2	Hendrawan (INA)	15	15

Quarterfinals
Sun Jun (CHN)	13	5
2	Hendrawan (INA)	15	15
