= Badminton at the 2002 Asian Games – Men's singles =

Men's singles at the 2002 Asian Games
- Venue: Gangseo Gymnasium
- Dates: 10–14 October
- Competitors: 23 from 14 nations

Medalists
gold medal	Taufik Hidayat	Indonesia
silver medal	Lee Hyun-il	South Korea
bronze medal	Hendrawan	Indonesia
bronze medal	Shon Seung-mo	South Korea

The badminton men's singles tournament at the 2002 Asian Games in Busan took place from 10 November to 14 November at Gangseo Gymnasium.

== Schedule ==
All times are Korea Standard Time (UTC+09:00)

Date	Time	Event
Thursday, 10 October 2002	14:00	Preliminaries 1st
Friday, 11 October 2002	14:45	Preliminaries 2nd
Saturday, 12 October 2002	16:00	Quarterfinals
Sunday, 13 October 2002	17:00	Semifinals
Monday, 14 October 2002	13:00	Final

== Results ==
=== Final ===
Final
Lee Hyun-il (KOR)	7	9
Taufik Hidayat (INA)	15	15

=== Top half ===
Preliminaries 1st
Abhinn Shyam Gupta (IND)	5	5
Hendrawan (INA)	15	15
Hidetaka Yamada (JPN)	11	7
Ng Wei (HKG)	15	15
Kennevic Asuncion (PHI)	11	5
Anuphap Theeraratsakul (THA)	15	15

Preliminaries 2nd
1	Xia Xuanze (CHN)	15	15
Tes Fac Sing (TMP)	2	1
Ronald Susilo (SIN)	8	5
Hendrawan (INA)	15	15
4	Wong Choong Hann (MAS)	15	3	15
Ng Wei (HKG)	8	15	5
Lee Hyun-il (KOR)	15	15
Anuphap Theeraratsakul (THA)	4	4

Quarterfinals
1	Xia Xuanze (CHN)	15	10	4
Hendrawan (INA)	12	15	15
4	Wong Choong Hann (MAS)	15	9	6
Lee Hyun-il (KOR)	12	15	15

Semifinals
Hendrawan (INA)	3	4
Lee Hyun-il (KOR)	15	15

=== Bottom half ===
Preliminaries 1st
Keita Masuda (JPN)	15	15
Chen Feng (TPE)	12	12
O Man Tong (MAC)	2	3
Mohd Hafiz Hashim (MAS)	15	15
Pullela Gopichand (IND)	15	15
Francisco Yong (TMP)	0	0
Tam Lok Tin (HKG)	15	15
Niluka Karunaratne (SRI)	6	4

Preliminaries 2nd
Keita Masuda (JPN)	3	2
Taufik Hidayat (INA)	15	15
Mohd Hafiz Hashim (MAS)	15	11	15
3	Chen Hong (CHN)	7	15	5
Pullela Gopichand (IND)	17	15
Boonsak Ponsana (THA)	15	6
Tam Lok Tin (HKG)	4	4
2	Shon Seung-mo (KOR)	15	15

Quarterfinals
Taufik Hidayat (INA)	15	15
Mohd Hafiz Hashim (MAS)	11	5
Pullela Gopichand (IND)	9	11
2	Shon Seung-mo (KOR)	15	15

Semifinals
Taufik Hidayat (INA)	15	15
2	Shon Seung-mo (KOR)	10	7
