= 2005 Singapore Open =

Tournament details
- Dates: 27 June 2005– 3 July 2005
- Edition: 56th
- Level: World Grand Prix 5 Stars
- Total prize money: US$170,000
- Venue: Singapore Indoor Stadium
- Location: Kallang, Singapore

Champions
- Men's singles: (Indonesia) Taufik Hidayat
- Women's singles: (China) Zhang Ning
- Men's doubles: (Indonesia) Sigit Budiarto (Indonesia) Candra Wijaya
- Women's doubles: (China) Zhang Dan (China) Zhang Yawen
- Mixed doubles: (China) Zhang Jun (China) Gao Ling

The 2005 Singapore Open (officially known as the Aviva Open Singapore 2005 for sponsorship reasons) was a five-star badminton tournament that took place at the Singapore Indoor Stadium in Singapore, from June 27 to July 3, 2005. The total prize money on offer was US$170,000.

== Prize money distributions ==
Below is the prize money distributions for each round (all in USD). In doubles it is referred as the prize money per pair:

Category	Winner	Runner-up	Semi finalist	Quarter finalist	Last 8
Men's Singles	13,600	6,800	3,400	1,700	680
Women's Singles	11,730	5,610	3,060	1,530	
Men's Doubles	12,240	6,800	4,080	2,380	
Women's Doubles	10,370	6,800	3,740	1,870	
Mixed Doubles	10,370	6,800	3,740	1,870	

== Results ==
=== Men's singles ===
Quarterfinals
1	(China) Lin Dan	15	15
9	(Hong Kong) Ng Wei	6	3
3	(Denmark) Peter Gade	13	15
8	(Indonesia) Taufik Hidayat	15	17
5	(China) Bao Chunlai	10	4
(South Korea) Lee Hyun-il	15	15
7	(China) Chen Hong	15	15
2	(Denmark) Kenneth Jonassen	6	9

Semifinals
1	(China) Lin Dan	12	8
8	(Indonesia) Taufik Hidayat	15	15
(South Korea) Lee Hyun-il	8	11
7	(China) Chen Hong	15	15

Finals
8	(Indonesia) Taufik Hidayat	15	15
7	(China) Chen Hong	9	3

=== Women's singles ===
Quarterfinals
1	(China) Xie Xingfang	8	7
(China) Zhou Mi	11	11
(China) Jiang Yanjiao	11	11
(Bulgaria) Petya Nedelcheva	2	3
(France) Pi Hongyan	13	7	11
(Indonesia) Mia Audina Tjiptawan	10	11	6
(Hong Kong) Wang Chen	8	2
2	(China) Zhang Ning	11	11

Semifinals
(China) Zhou Mi	11	11
(China) Jiang Yanjiao	4	1
(France) Pi Hongyan
2	(China) Zhang Ning	w	/	o

Finals
(China) Zhou Mi	5	7
2	(China) Zhang Ning	11	11

=== Men's doubles ===
Quarterfinals
1	(Denmark) Jens Eriksen (Denmark) Martin Lundgaard Hansen	15	15
(China) Cai Yun (China) Fu Haifeng	13	11
(Indonesia) Sigit Budiarto (Indonesia) Candra Wijaya	10	15	15
(England) Eng Hian (England) Flandy Limpele	15	7	6
(South Korea) Chung Jae-sung (South Korea) Lee Jae-jin	15	10	15
(Denmark) Lars Paaske (Denmark) Jonas Rasmussen	11	15	12
(Denmark) Mathias Boe (Denmark) Carsten Mogensen	15	15
2	(Indonesia) Alvent Yulianto Chandra (Indonesia) Luluk Hadiyanto	9	6

Semifinals
1	(Denmark) Jens Eriksen (Denmark) Martin Lundgaard Hansen	10	5
(Indonesia) Sigit Budiarto (Indonesia) Candra Wijaya	15	15
(South Korea) Chung Jae-sung (South Korea) Lee Jae-jin	9	13
(Denmark) Mathias Boe (Denmark) Carsten Mogensen	15	15

Finals
(Indonesia) Sigit Budiarto (Indonesia) Candra Wijaya	8	15	15
(Denmark) Mathias Boe (Denmark) Carsten Mogensen	15	8	7

=== Women's doubles ===
Quarterfinals
1	(China) Yang Wei (China) Zhang Jiewen	15	15
(Thailand) Satinee Jankrajangwong (Thailand) Saralee Thoungthongkam	2	3
(China) Gao Ling (China) Huang Sui	15	15
(Denmark) Britta Andersen (Denmark) Mette Schjoldager	0	0
(Indonesia) Jo Novita (Indonesia) Greysia Polii	11	15	15
(Malaysia) Chin Eei Hui (Malaysia) Wong Pei Tty	15	5	3
(China) Zhang Dan (China) Zhang Yawen	15	15
2	(China) Wei Yili (China) Zhao Tingting	4	6

Semifinals
1	(China) Yang Wei (China) Zhang Jiewen	10	11
(China) Gao Ling (China) Huang Sui	15	15
(Indonesia) Jo Novita (Indonesia) Greysia Polii	5	4
(China) Zhang Dan (China) Zhang Yawen	15	15

Finals
(China) Gao Ling (China) Huang Sui	13	10
(China) Zhang Dan (China) Zhang Yawen	15	15

=== Mixed doubles ===
Quarterfinals
1	(China) Zhang Jun (China) Gao Ling	15	15
(China) Xie Zhongbo (China) Zhang Yawen	12	4
(Denmark) Jens Eriksen (Denmark) Mette Schjoldager	17	15
(England) Anthony Clark (England) Donna Kellogg	14	12
(China) Chen Qiqiu (China) Zhao Tingting	15	11	15
(Indonesia) Nova Widianto (Indonesia) Liliyana Natsir	6	15	11
(Thailand) Sudket Prapakamol (Thailand) Saralee Thoungthongkam	4	15	15
2	(England) Nathan Robertson (England) Gail Emms	15	12	11

Semifinals
1	(China) Zhang Jun (China) Gao Ling	0	15	15
(Denmark) Jens Eriksen (Denmark) Mette Schjoldager	15	4	5
(China) Chen Qiqiu (China) Zhao Tingting	14	16
(Thailand) Sudket Prapakamol (Thailand) Saralee Thoungthongkam	17	17

Finals
1	(China) Zhang Jun (China) Gao Ling	10	15	15
(Thailand) Sudket Prapakamol (Thailand) Saralee Thoungthongkam	15	7	5
