= 1999 Indonesia Open (badminton) =

Tournament details
- Dates: 31 August–5 September
- Edition: 18th
- Total prize money: US$120,000
- Location: Denpasar, Indonesia

Champions
- Men's singles: (Indonesia) Taufik Hidayat
- Women's singles: (Indonesia) Lidya Djaelawijaya
- Men's doubles: (Indonesia) Ricky Subagja (Indonesia) Rexy Mainaky
- Women's doubles: (Denmark) Helene Kirkegaard (Denmark) Rikke Olsen
- Mixed doubles: (Indonesia) Tri Kusharjanto (Indonesia) Minarti Timur

The 1999 Indonesia Open in badminton was held in Denpasar, Bali, from August 31 to September 5, 1999. It was a four-star tournament and the prize money was US$120,000. In men's singles, Taufik Hidayat captured his first Indonesia Open title at the age of 18. This victory made him the youngest player to win the tournament and was the first of his six total titles.

== Final results ==
Category	Winners	Runners-up	Score
Men's singles	(Indonesia) Taufik Hidayat	(Indonesia) Budi Santoso	17–14, 15–12
Women's singles	(Indonesia) Lidya Djaelawijaya	(Indonesia) Ellen Angelina	11–8, 9–11, 11–2
Men's doubles	(Indonesia) Ricky Subagja & Rexy Mainaky	(Indonesia) Candra Wijaya & Tony Gunawan	15–12, 15–8
Women's doubles	(Denmark) Helene Kirkegaard & Rikke Olsen	(Indonesia) Eliza Nathanael & Deyana Lomban	7–15, 17–15, 15–7
Mixed doubles	(Indonesia) Tri Kusharjanto & Minarti Timur	(Indonesia) Bambang Suprianto & Zelin Resiana	15–3, 15–4

Preceded by 1998 Indonesia Open	Indonesia Open	Succeeded by 2000 Indonesia Open
