= Taufik Hidayat =

Indonesian badminton player and politician (born 1981)

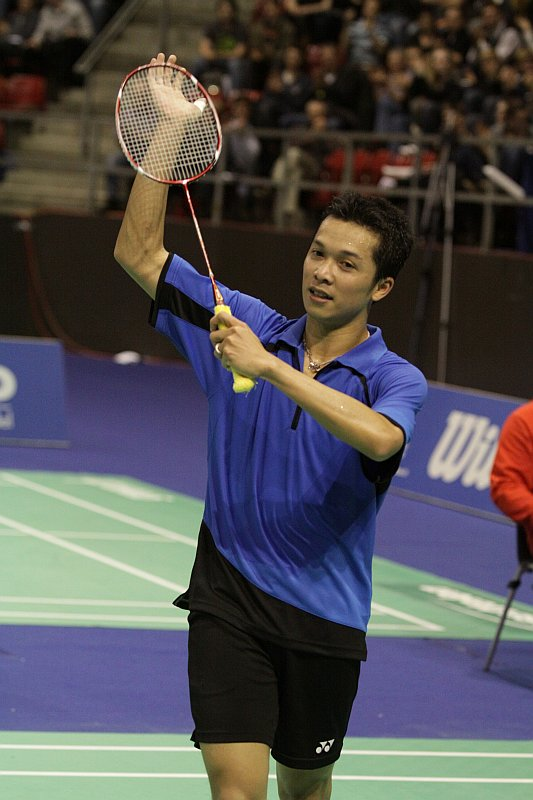
- Hidayat in 2009

Personal information
- Born: 10 August 1981 (age 45) Bandung, West Java, Indonesia
- Height: 1.76 m (5 ft 9 in)
- Weight: 65 kg (143 lb; 10.2 st)
- Spouse: Ami Gumelar (m. 2006)
- Children: 2

Sport
- Country: Indonesia
- Sport: Badminton
- Handedness: Right
- Coached by: Mulyo Handoyo
- Retired: 16 June 2013

Men's singles
- Career record: 413 wins, 138 losses
- Highest ranking: 1 (24 August 2000)
Medal record
Men's badminton
Representing Indonesia
Olympic Games
Gold medal – first place	2004 Athens	Men's singles
World Championships
Gold medal – first place	2005 Anaheim	Men's singles
Silver medal – second place	2010 Paris	Men's singles
Bronze medal – third place	2001 Seville	Men's singles
Bronze medal – third place	2009 Hyderabad	Men's singles
World Cup
Bronze medal – third place	2006 Yiyang	Men's singles
Sudirman Cup
Silver medal – second place	2001 Seville	Mixed team
Silver medal – second place	2005 Beijing	Mixed team
Silver medal – second place	2007 Glasgow	Mixed team
Bronze medal – third place	1999 Copenhagen	Mixed team
Bronze medal – third place	2003 Eindhoven	Mixed team
Bronze medal – third place	2011 Qingdao	Mixed team
Thomas Cup
Gold medal – first place	2000 Kuala Lumpur	Men's team
Gold medal – first place	2002 Guangzhou	Men's team
Silver medal – second place	2010 Kuala Lumpur	Men's team
Bronze medal – third place	2004 Jakarta	Men's team
Bronze medal – third place	2006 Sendai & Tokyo	Men's team
Bronze medal – third place	2008 Jakarta	Men's team
Asian Games
Gold medal – first place	1998 Bangkok	Men's team
Gold medal – first place	2002 Busan	Men's singles
Gold medal – first place	2006 Doha	Men's singles
Silver medal – second place	2002 Busan	Men's team
Bronze medal – third place	2006 Doha	Men's team
Bronze medal – third place	2010 Guangzhou	Men's team
Asian Championships
Gold medal – first place	2000 Jakarta	Men's singles
Gold medal – first place	2004 Kuala Lumpur	Men's singles
Gold medal – first place	2007 Johor Bahru	Men's singles
Silver medal – second place	2002 Bangkok	Men's singles
Silver medal – second place	2003 Jakarta	Men's singles
Bronze medal – third place	1998 Bangkok	Men's singles
Asia Cup
Gold medal – first place	1999 Ho Chi Minh	Men's team
Bronze medal – third place	2001 Singapore	Men's team
SEA Games
Gold medal – first place	1999 Bandar Seri Begawan	Men's singles
Gold medal – first place	1999 Bandar Seri Begawan	Men's team
Gold medal – first place	2007 Nakhon Ratchasima	Men's singles
Gold medal – first place	2007 Nakhon Ratchasima	Men's team
Gold medal – first place	2011 Jakarta–Palembang	Men's team
Silver medal – second place	2005 Manila	Men's team
Bronze medal – third place	2011 Jakarta–Palembang	Men's singles
Asian Junior Championships
Gold medal – first place	1997 Manila	Boys' singles
Silver medal – second place	1997 Manila	Boys' team

2nd Deputy Minister for Youth and Sports
- Incumbent
- Assumed office 21 October 2024
- President: Prabowo Subianto
- Minister: Dito Ariotedjo
- Preceded by: Abdul Gafur Tengku Idris

Personal details
- Party: Democratic

Taufik Hidayat (born 10 August 1981) is an Indonesian retired badminton player who is the current Deputy Minister for Youth and Sport of Indonesia. He is a former World champion, Olympic gold medalist, two time Asian Games gold medalist, and three time Asian champion. He is a 6 time Indonesia Open winner. Known as 'Mr Backhand', he is considered one of the greats in men's singles badminton.

== Career summary ==
When he was young, he joined the SGS club, a badminton club in Bandung, where he trained under Iie Sumirat.

At age 17, he won the Brunei Open and reached the semifinals of the 1998 Asian Championships and the Indonesia Open. In 1999, Hidayat won his first Indonesian Open title. In the same year he also reached the final of the All England and the Singapore Open but lost the finals to his great rival, Peter Gade and his senior in the national team Hariyanto Arbi respectively. In 2000, Hidayat, at just 19 years old, achieved the world number one ranking after winning the Malaysia Open, Asian Championships, and Indonesia Open. He also, once again, came runner-up at the All England Open as he was defeated by Chinese player, Xia Xuanze.

=== 1997 Asian Junior Badminton Championship ===
Just at 15, Hidayat won the boy's single event by defeating his future rival, Chen Hong in the final.

=== 2000 Sydney Olympics ===
Hidayat participated in the men's singles competition at the 2000 Summer Olympics in Sydney. In his first Olympics, he was eliminated in the quarter-finals by Ji Xinpeng of China.

Round	Opponent	Score	Result
Round of 64	–	–	-
Round of 32	(Japan) Hidetaka Yamada	15–5, 14–17, 15–8	Win
Round of 16	(Malaysia) Ong Ewe Hock	15–9, 13–15, 15–3	Win
Quarterfinals	(China) Ji Xinpeng [7]	12–15, 5–15	Lost

=== 2004 Athens Olympics ===
Hidayat won the men's singles gold medal at the 2004 Summer Olympics defeating Hidetaka Yamada of Japan and Wong Choong Hann of Malaysia in the first two rounds. Hidayat defeated Peter Gade of Denmark 15–12, 15–12 in the quarter final and Boonsak Ponsana of Thailand 15–9, 15–2 in the semifinal. Playing in the gold medal match, He defeated Korean Shon Seung-mo 15–8, 15–7 in the final to win the gold medal.

2004 Summer Olympics – Men's singles
Round	Opponent	Score	Result
Round of 32	(Japan) Hidetaka Yamada	15–8, 15–10	Win
Round of 16	(Malaysia) Wong Choong Hann [3]	11–15, 15–7, 15–9	Win
Quarterfinals	(Denmark) Peter Gade [6]	15–12, 15–12	Win
Semifinals	(Thailand) Boonsak Ponsana	15–9, 15–2	Win
Final	(South Korea) Shon Seung-mo [7]	15–8, 15–7	Gold

In the same year, Hidayat successfully retained his Indonesia Open title by defeating Chen Hong 15–9, 15–3 in the final and won his second Asian Championships title.

=== 2005: World Championships ===
In August 2005, he won the men's singles title at the World Championships defeating world number one Lin Dan of China 15–3, 15–7 in the final. With this title, he became the first men's singles player to hold the Olympic and World Championships title in consecutive years.

=== 2006–2007: Second Asian and SEA Games gold ===
Hidayat won the men's singles gold medal at the Asian Games in 2002 Busan and 2006 Doha. He also won the 2007 Asian Championship, and two men's singles gold medals at the SEA Games in 1999 Bandar Seri Begawan and 2007 Nakhon Ratchasima.

=== 2008 Beijing Olympics ===
Hidayat competed in the 2008 Summer Olympics but he was eliminated in the second round by Wong Choong Hann of Malaysia.

Round	Opponent	Score	Result
First round	-	-	-
Second round	(Malaysia) Wong Choong Hann	19–21, 16–21	Lost

=== 2012 London Olympics ===
For the fourth time, Hidayat participated in the Summer Olympics. Hidayat competed at the 2012 Summer Olympics but he was eliminated in the round of 16 by Lin Dan of China.

Round	Opponent	Score	Result
Group Stage	(Czech Republic) Petr Koukal	21–8, 21–8	Win
Group Stage	(Spain) Pablo Abián	22–20, 21–11	Win
Round of 16	(China) Lin Dan	9–21, 12–21	Lost

Popular media has at times focused on the perceived rivalry between Hidayat and Chinese player Lin Dan, referring to the two as "arch rivals". This was the last time that Hidayat participated in the Summer Olympics.

== Personal life ==
He married the daughter of Agum Gumelar, Ami Gumelar, on 4 February 2006. They had a daughter in early August 2007, named Natarina Alika Hidayat. She was born shortly before he had to leave for the World Championships.

In December 2012, Hidayat officially opened a badminton training center named the Taufik Hidayat Arena (THA), located at Ciracas, East Jakarta. This "house of badminton" is both named and owned by Taufik.

== Player attributes ==
Hidayat's shot-making strengths were his backhand (as he is perhaps most famous for his backhand smash, revered for its unusually high generation of power), forehand jump smash, drop shot (reverse slice in particular), smooth footwork and deceiving net play. Hidayat's forehand jump smash in the 2006 World Championships was once the fastest smash recorded in singles competition; he recorded 305 km/h (190 mph) in a match against Ng Wei. This power on both his forehand and backhand, combined with his tenacity at the net and scope for deceptive shots, provided him with an extremely diverse weaponry on court, making him one of the most difficult players to face on the open circuit. Criticisms were aimed at his occasional lack of fitness, impatience with loud crowds, and his propensity to return a net shot with another net shot even when his opponent was dangerously close to the net.

== Participation in the Indonesian team ==
- 6 times at Sudirman Cup (1999, 2001, 2003, 2005, 2007, 2011)
- 7 times at Thomas Cup (2000, 2002, 2004, 2006, 2008, 2010, 2012)
- 4 times at Summer Olympics at individual event (2000, 2004, 2008, 2012)

== Awards and nominations ==
Award	Year	Category	Result	Ref.
International Badminton Federation Awards	2004	Eddy Choong Player of the Year	Won	
International Badminton Federation Awards	2005	Eddy Choong Player of the Year	Won	
Government of Indonesia Awards	2005	Tanda Kehormatan Bintang Jasa Utama	Honored	
Government of Athens Awards	2006	Honorary Citizen of Greece	Honored	
RCTI Indonesian Sports Entertainment Awards	2024	Most Popular Legendary Athlete	Nominated	

== Achievements ==
=== Olympic Games ===
Men's singles
Year	Venue	Opponent	Score	Result	Ref.
2004	Goudi Olympic Hall, Athens, Greece	(South Korea) Shon Seung-mo	15–8, 15–7	Gold	

=== World Championships ===
Men's singles
Year	Venue	Opponent	Score	Result	Ref.
2001	Palacio de Deportes de San Pablo, Seville, Spain	(Indonesia) Hendrawan	15–11, 5–15, 7–1 retired	Bronze	
2005	Arrowhead Pond in Anaheim, United States	(China) Lin Dan	15–3, 15–7	Gold	
2009	Gachibowli Indoor Stadium, Hyderabad, India	(China) Chen Jin	16–21, 6–21	Bronze	
2010	Stade Pierre de Coubertin, Paris, France	(China) Chen Jin	13–21, 15–21	Silver	

=== World Cup ===
Men's singles
Year	Venue	Opponent	Score	Result	Ref.
2006	Olympic Park, Yiyang, China	(China) Lin Dan	Walkover	Bronze	

=== Asian Games ===
Men's singles
Year	Venue	Opponent	Score	Result	Ref.
2002	Gangseo Gymnasium, Busan, South Korea	(South Korea) Lee Hyun-il	15–7, 15–9	Gold	
2006	Aspire Hall 3, Doha, Qatar	(China) Lin Dan	21–15, 22–20	Gold	

=== Asian Championships ===
Men's singles
Year	Venue	Opponent	Score	Result	Ref.
1998	Nimibutr Stadium, Bangkok, Thailand	(Indonesia) Marleve Mainaky	15–17, 5–15	Bronze	
2000	Istora Senayan, Jakarta, Indonesia	(Indonesia) Rony Agustinus	14–17, 15–2, 15–3	Gold	
2002	Nimibutr Stadium, Bangkok, Thailand	(Indonesia) Sony Dwi Kuncoro	12–15, 5–15	Silver	
2003	Tennis Indoor Gelora Bung Karno, Jakarta, Indonesia	(Indonesia) Sony Dwi Kuncoro	5–15, 15–7, 8–15	Silver	
2004	Kuala Lumpur Badminton Stadium, Kuala Lumpur, Malaysia	(Indonesia) Sony Dwi Kuncoro	15–12, 7–15, 15–6	Gold	
2007	Bandaraya Stadium, Johor Bahru, Malaysia	(China) Chen Hong	21–18, 21–19	Gold	

=== SEA Games ===
Men's singles
Year	Venue	Opponent	Score	Result	Ref.
1999	Hassanal Bolkiah Sports Complex, Bandar Seri Begawan, Brunei	(Malaysia) Wong Choong Hann	15–10, 11–15, 15–11	Gold	
2007	Wongchawalitkul University, Nakhon Ratchasima, Thailand	(Singapore) Kendrick Lee Yen Hui	21–15, 21–9	Gold	
2011	Istora Senayan, Jakarta, Indonesia	(Thailand) Tanongsak Saensomboonsuk	14–21, 19–21	Bronze	

=== Asian Junior Championships ===
Boys' singles
Year	Venue	Opponent	Score	Result	Ref.
1997	Ninoy Aquino Stadium, Manila, Philippines	(China) Chen Hong	15–11, 15–2	Gold	

=== BWF Superseries (1 title, 9 runners-up) ===
The BWF Superseries, launched on 14 December 2006 and implemented in 2007, is a series of elite badminton tournaments, sanctioned by Badminton World Federation (BWF). BWF Superseries has two level such as Superseries and Superseries Premier. A season of Superseries features twelve tournaments around the world, which introduced since 2011, with successful players invited to the BWF Superseries Finals held at the year end.

Men's singles
Year	Tournament	Opponent	Score	Result	Ref.
2007	Japan Open	(Malaysia) Lee Chong Wei	20–22, 21–19, 19–21	(silver) Runner-up	
2008	French Open	(Denmark) Peter Gade	21–16, 17–21, 7–21	(silver) Runner-up	
2009	Indonesia Open	(Malaysia) Lee Chong Wei	9–21, 14–21	(silver) Runner-up	
2009	Japan Open	(China) Bao Chunlai	15–21, 12–21	(silver) Runner-up	
2009	French Open	(China) Lin Dan	6–21, 15–21	(silver) Runner-up	
2010	Indonesia Open	(Malaysia) Lee Chong Wei	19–21, 8–21	(silver) Runner-up	
2010	Denmark Open	(Denmark) Jan Ø. Jørgensen	19–21, 19–21	(silver) Runner-up	
2010	French Open	(Denmark) Joachim Persson	21–16, 21–11	(gold) Winner	
2010	Hong Kong Open	(Malaysia) Lee Chong Wei	19–21, 9–21	(silver) Runner-up	
2011	Malaysia Open	(Malaysia) Lee Chong Wei	8–21, 17–21	(silver) Runner-up	

BWF Super Series Finals tournament
BWF Super Series Premier tournament
BWF Super Series tournament

=== BWF Grand Prix (17 titles, 7 runners-up) ===
The BWF Grand Prix has two levels, the BWF Grand Prix and Grand Prix Gold. It is a series of badminton tournaments sanctioned by the Badminton World Federation (BWF) since 2007. The World Badminton Grand Prix has been sanctioned by International Badminton Federation (IBF) since 1983.

Men's singles
Year	Tournament	Opponent	Score	Result	Ref.
1998	Brunei Open	(China) Dong Jiong	12–15, 15–3, 15–9	(gold) Winner	
1999	All England Open	(Denmark) Peter Gade	11–15, 15–7, 10–15	(silver) Runner-up	
1999	Indonesia Open	(Indonesia) Budi Santoso	17–14, 15–12	(gold) Winner	
1999	Singapore Open	(Indonesia) Hariyanto Arbi	15–13, 10–15, 11–15	(silver) Runner-up	
2000	All England Open	(China) Xia Xuanze	6–15, 13–15	(silver) Runner-up	
2000	Indonesia Open	(Malaysia) Ong Ewe Hock	15–5, 15–13	(gold) Winner	
2000	Malaysia Open	(China) Xia Xuanze	15–10, 17–14	(gold) Winner	
2001	Singapore Open	(Malaysia) Wong Choong Hann	7–5, 0–7, 7–1, 1–7, 7–4	(gold) Winner	
2002	Indonesia Open	(China) Chen Hong	15–12, 15–12	(gold) Winner	
2002	Chinese Taipei Open	(Indonesia) Agus Hariyanto	15–10, 15–8	(gold) Winner	
2003	Indonesia Open	(China) Chen Hong	15–9, 15–9	(gold) Winner	
2004	Indonesia Open	(China) Chen Hong	15–10, 15–11	(gold) Winner	
2005	Singapore Open	(China) Chen Hong	15–9, 15–3	(gold) Winner	
2006	Indonesia Open	(China) Bao Chunlai	21–18, 21–19	(gold) Winner	
2006	Japan Open	(China) Lin Dan	21–16, 16–21, 3–21	(silver) Runner-up	
2007	Chinese Taipei Open	(Indonesia) Sony Dwi Kuncoro	21–18, 6–21, 13–21	(silver) Runner-up	
2007	Macau Open	(China) Chen Jin	21–19, 17–21, 18–21	(silver) Runner-up	
2008	Macau Open	(Malaysia) Lee Chong Wei	21–19, 21–15	(gold) Winner	
2009	India Open	(Malaysia) Muhammad Hafiz Hashim	21–18, 21–19	(gold) Winner	
2009	U.S. Open	(Chinese Taipei) Hsueh Hsuan-yi	21–15, 21–16	(gold) Winner	
2010	Canada Open	(France) Brice Leverdez	21–15, 21–11	(gold) Winner	
2010	Indonesia Grand Prix Gold	(Indonesia) Dionysius Hayom Rumbaka	26–28, 21–17, 21–14	(gold) Winner	
2011	Canada Open	(Germany) Marc Zwiebler	13–21, 23–25	(silver) Runner-up	
2011	India Grand Prix Gold	(India) Sourabh Varma	21–15, 21–18	(gold) Winner	

BWF Grand Prix Gold tournament
BWF Grand Prix tournament

=== IBF Junior International (1 title) ===
Boys' singles
Year	Tournament	Opponent	Score	Result	Ref.
1997	German Junior	(Japan) Keita Masuda		(gold) Winner	

== Performance timeline ==
=== National team ===
- Junior level

Team event	1997
Asian Junior Championships	Silver

- Senior level

Team event	1998	1999	2000	2001	2002	2003	2004	2005	2006	2007	2008	2009	2010	2011
SEA Games	—N/a	Gold	—N/a	A	—N/a	A	—N/a	Silver	—N/a	Gold	—N/a	A	—N/a	Gold
Asian Games	Gold	—N/a			Silver	—N/a			Bronze	—N/a			Bronze	—N/a
Thomas Cup	A	—N/a	Gold	—N/a	Gold	—N/a	Bronze	—N/a	Bronze	—N/a	Bronze	—N/a	Silver	—N/a
Sudirman Cup	—N/a	Bronze	—N/a	Silver	—N/a	Bronze	—N/a	Silver	—N/a	Silver	—N/a	A	—N/a	Bronze

=== Individual competitions ===
- Junior level

Event	1997
Asian Junior Championships	Gold

- Senior level

Event	1999	2007	2011
SEA Games	Gold	Gold	Bronze

Event	1998	2000	2002	2003	2004	2007	2010
Asian Championships	Bronze	Gold	Silver	Silver	Gold	Gold	R3

Event	1998	2002	2006	2010
Asian Games	QF	Gold	Gold	QF

Event	1999	2001	2003	2005	2006	2007	2009	2010	2011
World Championships	R3	Bronze	R3	Gold	R3	R2	Bronze	Silver	R2

Event	2000	2004	2008	2012
Olympic Games	QF	Gold	R32	R16

Tournament	2007	2008	2009	2010	2011	2012	2013	Best
BWF Superseries
All England Open	A	QF	SF	QF	R1	QF	R1	F (1999, 2000)
Swiss Open	A	QF	QF	R2	GPG			QF (2008, 2009)
India Open	GPG				QF	QF	R2	W (2009)
Malaysia Open	R1	R2	A	R1	F	QF	R2	W (2000)
Singapore Open	R2	A			R2	R1	A	W (2001, 2005)
Indonesia Open	SF	w/d	F	F	QF	R2	R1	W (1999, 2000, 2002, 2003, 2004, 2006)
China Masters	QF	QF	A	w/d	A			QF (2007, 2008)
Korea Open	A	w/d	A		QF	R1	A	QF (2011)
Japan Open	F	QF	F	R1	R1	QF	A	F (2006, 2007, 2009)
Denmark Open	R2	A		F	R2	A		F (2010)
French Open	QF	F	F	W	R1	A		W (2010)
China Open	A	R2	A		R2	A		R2 (2008, 2011)
Hong Kong Open	QF	SF	R2	F	A	R1	A	F (2010)
BWF Superseries Finals	—N/a	SF	GS	Ret.	GS	DNQ		SF (2008)
Year-end Ranking			3	2	9	19	106	1
Tournament	2007	2008	2009	2010	2011	2012	2013	Best

Tournament	2007	2008	2009	2010	2011	2012	2013	Best
BWF Grand Prix and Grand Prix Gold
Philippines Open	R2	—N/a	A	—N/a				R2 (2007)
Australian Open	IS		A			QF	R3	QF (2012)
India Open	—N/a	A	W	A	SS			W (2009)
Malaysia Masters	—N/a		R1	SF	A			SF (2010)
Swiss Open	SS				A	SF	A	SF (2012)
U.S. Open	A		W	A	QF	A		W (2009)
Canada Open	A	—N/a		W	F	A		W (2010)
Chinese Taipei Open	F	A	SF	A				W (2002)
Macau Open	F	W	SF	A	QF	R3	A	W (2008)
Indonesian Masters	—N/a			W	SF	A		W (2010)
Syed Modi International	—N/a		A		W	R1	—N/a	W (2011)

Tournament	1998	1999	2000	2001	2002	2003	2004	2005	2006	Best
IBF World Grand Prix
All England Open	A	F	F	R2	A		SF	A		F (1999, 2000)
Brunei Open	W	—N/a								W (1998)
Chinese Taipei Open	—N/a			—N/a	W					W (2002)
Denmark Open	A	QF	A					A		QF (1999)
Hong Kong Open			—N/a		—N/a		—N/a		QF	QF (2006)
Indonesia Open	SF	W	W	R2	W	W	W		W	W (1999, 2000, 2002, 2003, 2004, 2006)
Japan Open									F	F (2006)
Korea Open									R3	R3 (2006)
Malaysia Open			W							W (2000)
Singapore Open		F	—N/a	W				W	R1	W (2001, 2005)

== Record against selected opponents ==
Record against Superseries finalists, World Championships semifinalists and Olympic quarterfinalists.

- (China) Bao Chunlai 5–9
- (China) Chen Hong 9–2
- (China) Chen Jin 2–4
- (China) Chen Long 2–4
- (China) Chen Yu 7–0
- (China) Du Pengyu 5–1
- (China) Ji Xinpeng 0–2
- (China) Lin Dan 4–13
- (China) Xia Xuanze 2–2
- (Denmark) Viktor Axelsen 0–1
- (Denmark) Peter Gade 10–8
- (Denmark) Poul-Erik Høyer Larsen 1–1
- (Denmark) Jan Ø. Jørgensen 2–2
- (Guatemala) Kevin Cordón 1–0
- (Indonesia) Hariyanto Arbi 0–1
- (Indonesia) Hendrawan 2–1
- (Indonesia) Sony Dwi Kuncoro 3–3
- (Indonesia) Tommy Sugiarto 2–1
- (Japan) Sho Sasaki 1–3
- (South Korea) Lee Hyun-il 2–4
- (South Korea) Park Sung-hwan 11–2
- (South Korea) Son Wan-ho 3–0
- (Malaysia) Lee Chong Wei 8–15
- (Malaysia) Liew Daren 2–1
- (Malaysia) Wong Choong Hann 4–6
- (Singapore) Ronald Susilo 3–1
- (Thailand) Boonsak Ponsana 10–1
