= 2000 Indonesia Open (badminton) =

Tournament details
- Dates: 19–23 July
- Edition: 19th
- Total prize money: US$150,000
- Venue: Istora Senayan
- Location: Jakarta, Indonesia

Champions
- Men's singles: (Indonesia) Taufik Hidayat
- Women's singles: (Denmark) Camilla Martin
- Men's doubles: (Indonesia) Candra Wijaya (Indonesia) Tony Gunawan
- Women's doubles: (England) Joanne Goode (England) Donna Kellogg
- Mixed doubles: (England) Simon Archer (England) Joanne Goode

The 2000 Sanyo Indonesia Open in badminton was held in Jakarta, from July 19 to July 23, 2000. It was a five-star tournament and the prize money was US$150,000.

== Venue ==
- Senayan

== Final results ==
Category	Winners	Runners-up	Score
Men's singles	(Indonesia) Taufik Hidayat	(Malaysia) Ong Ewe Hock	15–5, 15–13
Women's singles	(Denmark) Camilla Martin	(Hong Kong) Wang Chen	14–17, 15–6, 15–8
Men's doubles	(Indonesia) Candra Wijaya & Tony Gunawan	(Indonesia) Flandy Limpele & Eng Hian	14–17, 15–6, 15–8
Women's doubles	(England) Joanne Goode & Donna Kellogg	(Netherlands) Nicole van Hooren & Lotte Jonathans	7–15, 15–12, 15–10
Mixed doubles	(England) Simon Archer & Joanne Goode	(Denmark) Michael Søgaard & Rikke Olsen	15–13, 11–15, 15–4

Preceded by 1999 Indonesia Open	Indonesia Open	Succeeded by 2001 Indonesia Open
