= Antti Viitikko =

Finnish badminton player

Antti Viitikko (born 29 November 1976 in Espoo) is a male badminton player from Finland. Viitikko played badminton at the 2004 Summer Olympics in men's singles, losing in the round of 32 to Shon Seung-mo of Korea.
