= Ji Xinpeng =

Chinese badminton player (born 1977)

Ji Xinpeng 吉新鹏
Personal information
- Born: 30 December 1977 (age 48) Xiamen, Fujian, China
- Height: 1.81 m (5 ft 11 in)

Sport
- Country: China
- Sport: Badminton
- Handedness: Right
- Event: Men's singles

Men's singles
- BWF profile
Medal record
Men's badminton
Representing China
Olympic Games
Gold medal – first place	2000 Sydney	Men's singles
Sudirman Cup
Gold medal – first place	2001 Seville	Mixed team
Thomas Cup
Silver medal – second place	2000 Kuala Lumpur	Men's team

Ji Xinpeng (simplified Chinese: 吉新鹏; traditional Chinese: 吉新鵬; pinyin: Jí Xīnpéng; born 30 December 1977) is a retired Chinese badminton player.

== Career ==
Ji Xinpeng is the first Chinese badminton player to win an Olympic gold medal in men's singles. Having never previously captured a top-tier event on the international circuit, he surprised the field at the 2000 Games in Sydney by defeating players such as Taufik Hidayat, Peter Gade and, in the final, Hendrawan. Prior to the Olympic Games, Ji was also the champion at the Japan Open held in April. He became a coach in the Chinese national badminton team in 2008.

== Achievements ==
=== Olympic Games ===
Men's singles
Year	Venue	Opponent	Score	Result
2000	Pavilion 3, Sydney Olympic Park; Sydney, Australia	(Indonesia) Hendrawan	15–4, 15–13	Gold

=== IBF World Grand Prix ===
The World Badminton Grand Prix sanctioned by International Badminton Federation (IBF) from 1983 to 2006.

Men's singles
Year	Tournament	Opponent	Score	Result
1999	Dutch Open	(China) Xia Xuanze	10–15, 13–15	(silver) Runner-up
1999	Thailand Open	(China) Chen Gang	12–15, 6–15	(silver) Runner-up
2000	Swiss Open	(China) Xia Xuanze	8–15, 6–15	(silver) Runner-up
2000	Japan Open	(Indonesia) Hendrawan	15-4, 15-13	(gold) Winner
