= Shon Seung-mo =

South Korean badminton player

Personal information
- Born: 1 July 1980 (age 46) Milyang, South Gyeongsang Province, South Korea
- Height: 1.82 m (6 ft 0 in)
- Weight: 79 kg (174 lb)

Sport
- Country: South Korea
- Sport: Badminton
- Event: Men's singles

Men's singles
- BWF profile
Medal record
Men's badminton
Representing South Korea
Olympic Games
Silver medal – second place	2004 Athens	Men's singles
World Championships
Bronze medal – third place	2003 Birmingham	Men's singles
World Cup
Bronze medal – third place	2005 Yiyang	Men's singles
Sudirman Cup
Bronze medal – third place	2007 Glasgow	Mixed team
Bronze medal – third place	2005 Beijing	Mixed team
Bronze medal – third place	2001 Seville	Mixed team
Thomas Cup
Silver medal – second place	2008 Jakarta	Men's team
Bronze medal – third place	2004 Jakarta	Men's team
Bronze medal – third place	2000 Kuala Lumpur	Men's team
Asian Games
Gold medal – first place	2002 Busan	Men's team
Silver medal – second place	2006 Doha	Men's team
Bronze medal – third place	2002 Busan	Men's singles
Asian Championships
Bronze medal – third place	2004 Kuala Lumpur	Men's singles
Bronze medal – third place	2001 Manila	Men's singles
Asia Cup
Silver medal – second place	2001 Singapore	Men's team
Asia Junior Championships
Bronze medal – third place	1998 Kuala Lumpur	Boys' singles

- Shon Seung-mo
- Hangul: 손승모
- Hanja: 孫升模
- RR: Son Seungmo
- MR: Son Sŭngmo

Shon Seung-mo (Korean: 손승모; born 1 July 1980 in Milyang, South Gyeongsang Province) is a badminton player from South Korea. In 2004, he won the silver medal at the Athens Summer Olympics.

== Career ==
=== Olympic Games ===
He competed at the 2000 and 2004 Summer Olympics. In 2004, he defeated Antti Viitikko of Finland and Richard Vaughan of Great Britain in the first two rounds. In the quarterfinals, Shon defeated Chen Hong of People's Republic of China 10-15, 15-4, 15-10. Shon advanced to the semifinals, in which he beat Sony Dwi Kuncoro of Indonesia 15-6, 9-15, 15-9. Playing in the gold medal match, he lost to Indonesian Taufik Hidayat by a score of 15-8, 15-7 to finish with the silver medal.

Shon's right eye is almost blind, after being hit in the eye by a shuttlecock when he was 15 years of age.

== Achievements ==
=== Olympic Games ===
Men's singles
Year	Venue	Opponent	Score	Result
2004	Goudi Olympic Hall, Athens, Greece	(Indonesia) Taufik Hidayat	8–15, 7–15	Silver

=== World Championships ===
Men's singles
Year	Venue	Opponent	Score	Result
2003	National Indoor Arena, Birmingham, United Kingdom	(Malaysia) Wong Choong Hann	4–15, 5–15	Bronze

=== World Cup ===
Men's singles
Year	Venue	Opponent	Score	Result
2005	Olympic Park, Yiyang, China	(Thailand) Boonsak Ponsana	21–23, 15–21	Bronze

=== Asian Games ===
Men's singles
Year	Venue	Opponent	Score	Result
2002	Gangseo Gymnasium, Busan, South Korea	(Indonesia) Taufik Hidayat	10–15, 7–15	Bronze

=== Asian Championships ===
Men's singles
Year	Venue	Opponent	Score	Result
2004	Kuala Lumpur Badminton Stadium, Kuala Lumpur, Malaysia	(Indonesia) Taufik Hidayat	9–15, 6–15	Bronze
2001	PhilSports Arena, Manila, Philippines	(China) Lin Dan	15–3, 11–15, 7–15	Bronze

=== Asian Junior Championships ===
Boys' singles
Year	Venue	Opponent	Score	Result
1998	Kuala Lumpur Badminton Stadium, Kuala Lumpur, Malaysia	(Chinese Taipei) Chien Yu-hsiu	6–15, 4–15	Bronze

=== Grand Prix ===
The World Badminton Grand Prix sanctioned by International Badminton Federation (IBF) since 1983.

Men's singles
Year	Tournament	Opponent	Score	Result
2005	Chinese Taipei Open	(South Korea) Lee Hyun-il	13–15, 5–15	(silver) Runner-up
2002	Korea Open	(China) Lin Dan	7–1, 3–7, 3–7, 5–7	(silver) Runner-up
2001	Hong Kong Open	(Thailand) Boonsak Ponsana	7–2, 4–7, 8–7, 7–8, 7–3	(gold) Winner

=== BWF International Challenge/Series ===
Men's singles
Year	Tournament	Opponent	Score	Result
2010	Singapore International	(South Korea) Hong Seung-ki	17–21, 12–21	(silver) Runner-up
2009	Singapore International	(Indonesia) Fauzi Adnan	21–9, 21–12	(gold) Winner
2007	Korea International	(Japan) Kenichi Tago	21–15, 18–21, 21–10	(gold) Winner
2005	Malaysia Satellite	(Malaysia) Yogendran Krishnan	15–6, 7–15, 15–6	(gold) Winner
2005	Thailand Satellite	(South Korea) Lee Hyun-il	15–5, 15–3	(gold) Winner
1999	Norwegian International	(South Korea) Hwang Sun-ho	13–15, 15–10, 15–13	(gold) Winner

BWF International Challenge tournament
BWF International Series tournament

== Record Against Selected Opponents ==
Includes results against Super Series finalists, World Championships semifinalists, and Olympic quarterfinalists.

- (China) Bao Chunlai 1-5
- (China) Chen Hong 3-3
- (China) Chen Yu 0-4
- (China) Lin Dan 1-8
- (China) Xia Xuanze 0-2
- (Chinese Taipei) Hsieh Yu-hsing 2-0
- (Denmark) Peter Gade 0-4
- (Denmark) Jan Ø. Jørgensen 1-0
- (Denmark) Joachim Persson 1-1
- (Finland) Antti Viitikko 1-0
- (Indonesia) Hendrawan 1-1
- (Indonesia) Taufik Hidayat 2-6
- (Indonesia) Sony Dwi Kuncoro 2-4
- (Indonesia) Simon Santoso 0-1
- (Indonesia) Ardy Wiranata 0-1
- (South Korea) Lee Hyun-il 1-1
- (South Korea) Park Sung-hwan 2-0
- (South Korea) Park Tae-sang 1-1
- (Malaysia) Lee Chong Wei 0-2
- (Malaysia) Rashid Sidek 0-2
- (Malaysia) Wong Choong Hann 3-5
- (Singapore) Ronald Susilo 4-3
- (Thailand) Boonsak Ponsana 4-3
- (Wales) Richard Vaughan 2-0
