= 1998 Indonesia Open (badminton) =

Tournament details
- Dates: 26 October–1 November
- Edition: 17th
- Total prize money: US$120,000
- Venue: Istora Senayan
- Location: Jakarta, Indonesia

Champions
- Men's singles: (Malaysia) Yong Hock Kin
- Women's singles: (Indonesia) Mia Audina
- Men's doubles: (Indonesia) Ricky Subagja (Indonesia) Rexy Mainaky
- Women's doubles: (Indonesia) Eliza Nathanael (Indonesia) Deyana Lomban
- Mixed doubles: (Indonesia) Tri Kusharjanto (Indonesia) Minarti Timur

The 1998 Indonesia Open in badminton was held in Jakarta, from October 26 to November 1, 1998. It was a four-star tournament with the prize money of US$120,000.

== Venue ==
- Istora Senayan

== Final results ==
Category	Winners	Runners-up	Score
Men's singles	(Malaysia) Yong Hock Kin	(Indonesia) Budi Santoso	15–7, 15–6
Women's singles	(Indonesia) Mia Audina	(Denmark) Mette Sorensen	11–0, 11–6
Men's doubles	(Indonesia) Ricky Subagja & Rexy Mainaky	(Indonesia) Flandy Limpele & Eng Hian	15–5, 15–4
Women's doubles	(Indonesia) Eliza Nathanael & Deyana Lomban	(Denmark) Marlene Thomsen & Rikke Olsen	7–15, 17–15, 15–7
Mixed doubles	(Indonesia) Tri Kusharjanto & Minarti Timur	(Denmark) Michael Søgaard & Rikke Olsen	10–15, 15–6, 15–6

Preceded by 1997 Indonesia Open	Indonesia Open	Succeeded by 1999 Indonesia Open
