= Lee Hyun-il =

South Korean badminton player (born 1980)

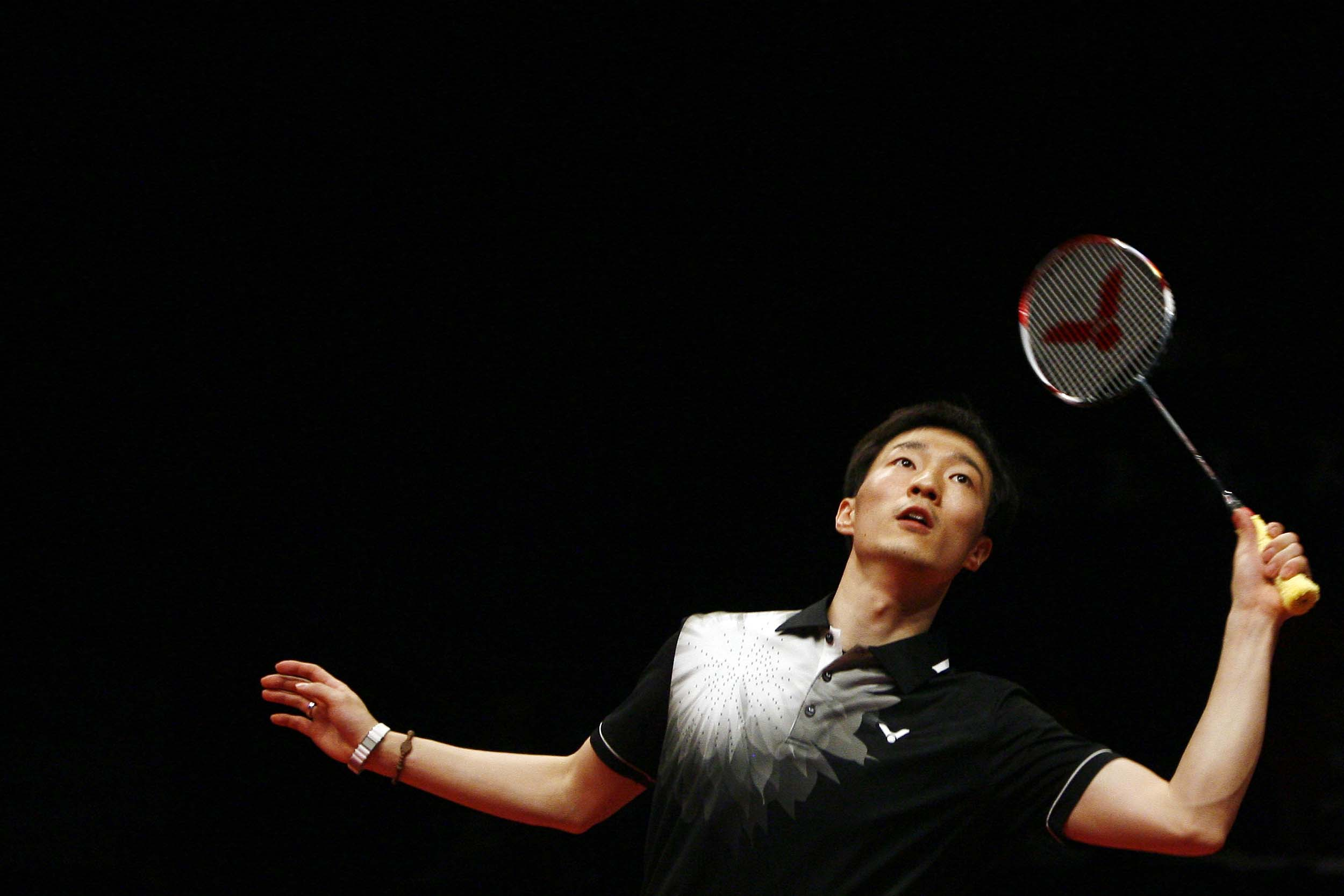

Personal information
- Born: 17 April 1980 (age 46) Seoul, South Korea
- Height: 176 cm (5 ft 9 in)
- Weight: 67 kg (148 lb)

Sport
- Country: South Korea
- Sport: Badminton
- Handedness: Left
- Retired: 24 November 2019

Men's singles
- Highest ranking: 1 (21 February 2004)
- BWF profile
Medal record
Men's badminton
Representing South Korea
World Championships
Bronze medal – third place	2006 Madrid	Men's singles
Sudirman Cup
Gold medal – first place	2003 Eindhoven	Mixed team
Bronze medal – third place	2001 Seville	Mixed team
Bronze medal – third place	2005 Beijing	Mixed team
Bronze medal – third place	2011 Qingdao	Mixed team
Thomas Cup
Silver medal – second place	2008 Jakarta	Men's team
Silver medal – second place	2012 Wuhan	Men's team
Bronze medal – third place	2000 Kuala Lumpur	Men's team
Bronze medal – third place	2004 Jakarta	Men's team
Asian Games
Gold medal – first place	2002 Busan	Men's team
Gold medal – first place	2014 Incheon	Men's team
Silver medal – second place	2002 Busan	Men's singles
Silver medal – second place	2006 Doha	Men's team
Silver medal – second place	2010 Guangzhou	Men's team
Bronze medal – third place	2006 Doha	Men's singles
Asian Championships
Bronze medal – third place	2005 Hyderabad	Men's singles
Asia Cup
Silver medal – second place	2001 Singapore	Men's team
Asian Junior Championships
Bronze medal – third place	1998 Kuala Lumpur	Boys' singles

- Lee Hyun-il
- Hangul: 이현일
- Hanja: 李炫一
- RR: I Hyeonil
- MR: I Hyŏnil

Lee Hyun-il (Korean: 이현일; born 17 April 1980) is a former badminton player from South Korea. He is a former World and Asian Championships bronze medalist, and was part of South Korean team that won the 2003 Sudirman Cup as well the gold medals at the 2002 and 2014 Asian Games. Finishing twice as 4th position in Olympics (2008 & 2012), he is currently coaching the Korea National Women's team.

== Career ==
=== 2002 Asian Games ===
Lee competed in the 2002 Asian Games where he showed signs of promise as an ace singles player for team Korea. In the men's team event, Lee dominated the opponents he faced in the tourney, completing all three matches less than 30 minutes and allowing only seven points in the semifinals and eight in the final. Team Korea eventually won their first men's team gold medal since 1986 when Park Joo-bong and Kim Moon-soo led the team.

2002 Asian Games – Men's team
Date	Round	Result	Score	Opponents
October 6	Quarterfinal	Win	15–11, 15–7	(Japan) Hidetaka Yamada
October 7	Semifinal	Win	15–5, 15–2	(Malaysia) Lee Tsuen Seng
October 9	Final	Win	15–3, 15–5	(Indonesia) Rony Agustinus

=== 2003 Sudirman Cup ===
At the 2003 Sudirman Cup held in Eindhoven, the Netherlands, Lee helped his team to win its third Sudirman Cup title, winning all three singles matches. Though many great doubles players from South Korea had won numerous international competitions, team Korea had always struggled to win the Thomas and Sudirman Cup competitions due to the lack of top men's singles players. However, Lee, the winner of the 2003 Swiss Open, showed spectacular performances through the Sudirman Cup tournament, not dropping a single set. In the semifinal, Lee defeated 2001 World Championship runner-up and 2001 All England Open semifinalist Peter Gade 2-0, which led his team to a 3-2 victory over Denmark. Lee won another 2-0 upset victory over world number one ranked Chen Hong in game 1 of the South Korea's final team event against China.

2003 Sudirman Cup
Date	Round	Result	Score	Opponents
March 18	Group 1A	Win	15–5, 15–5	(Sweden) Rasmus Wengberg
March 22	Semifinal	Win	15–9, 15–12	(Denmark) Peter Gade
March 23	Final	Win	15–10, 15–12	(China) Chen Hong

=== 2004 Olympics ===
Lee competed in the 2004 Summer Olympics, which was his first Olympic appearance. Lee easily defeated Stuart Brehaut of Australia in the first round. However, he was surprisingly eliminated in the second round by Boonsak Ponsana of Thailand.

=== 2006 ===
At the 2006 IBF World Championships held in Madrid, Spain, Lee captured his first World Championship medal in the men's singles event. He defeated Chetan Anand, Jan Fröhlich, Eric Pang and Chen Jin before losing to Bao Chunlai of China in the semifinals.

2006 World Championships – Men's Singles
Date	Round	Result	Score	Opponents
September 18	First Rd	Win	21–18, 18–21, 21–10	(India) Chetan Anand
September 19	Second Rd	Win	21–10, 21–4	(Czech Republic) Jan Fröhlich
September 20	Third Rd	Win	21–16, 21–6	(Netherlands) Eric Pang
September 21	Quarterfinal	Win	21–14, 19–21, 21–12	(China) Chen Jin
September 22	Semifinal	Loss	15–21, 19–21	(China) Bao Chunlai

=== 2008 Olympics ===
In 2008, he defeated top rank players Lin Dan and Lee Chong Wei in the Korea Open. He participated in the Beijing Olympics, where he reached the semi-finals before being defeated by world number one, Lee Chong Wei from Malaysia, and then being beaten by Chen Jin of China in the bronze-medal playoff.

=== Retirement and comeback ===
After the 2008 Olympics, Lee announced his retirement from international badminton and only competed in national competitions. However, in April 2010 he came out of retirement after much persuasion from the coach and teammates to fill the void of singles players in the Korean national squad. In May 2010, Lee participated in the 2010 Thomas Cup and played in two singles matches.

=== 2012 Summer Olympics ===
Lee lost to Chinese Chen Long in the badminton bronze-medal playoff on 5 August 2012.

=== 2019 ===
Lee who joined the Miryang City Hall team since 2018, decided to retire from the team on 22 November 2019.

== Achievements ==
=== World Championships ===
Men's singles
Year	Venue	Opponent	Score	Result
2006	Palacio de Deportes de la Comunidad, Madrid, Spain	(China) Bao Chunlai	15–21, 19–21	Bronze

=== Asian Games ===
Men's singles
Year	Venue	Opponent	Score	Result
2002	Gangseo Gymnasium, Busan, South Korea	(Indonesia) Taufik Hidayat	7–15, 9–15	Silver
2006	Aspire Hall 3, Doha, Qatar	(China) Lin Dan	3–21, 10–21	Bronze

=== Asian Championships ===
Men's singles
Year	Venue	Opponent	Score	Result
2005	Gachibowli Indoor Stadium, Hyderabad, India	(Malaysia) Kuan Beng Hong	11–15, 4–15	Bronze

=== Asian Junior Championships ===
Boys' singles
Year	Venue	Opponent	Score	Result
1998	Kuala Lumpur Badminton Stadium, Kuala Lumpur, Malaysia	(Indonesia) Endra Feryanto	8–15, 5–15	Bronze

=== BWF World Tour (1 title) ===
The BWF World Tour, announced on 19 March 2017 and implemented in 2018, is a series of elite badminton tournaments, sanctioned by Badminton World Federation (BWF). The BWF World Tour are divided into six levels, namely World Tour Finals, Super 1000, Super 750, Super 500, Super 300 (part of the HSBC World Tour), and the BWF Tour Super 100.

Men's singles
Year	Tournament	Level	Opponent	Score	Result
2018	Macau Open	Super 300	(China) Zhou Zeqi	21–9, 21–19	(gold) Winner

=== BWF Superseries (1 title, 3 runners-up) ===
The BWF Superseries, launched on 14 December 2006 and implemented in 2007, is a series of elite badminton tournaments, sanctioned by Badminton World Federation (BWF). BWF Superseries has two level such as Superseries and Superseries Premier. A season of Superseries features twelve tournaments around the world, which introduced since 2011, with successful players invited to the Superseries Finals held at the year end.

Men's singles
Year	Tournament	Opponent	Score	Result
2008	Malaysia Open	(Malaysia) Lee Chong Wei	15–21, 21–11, 17–21	(silver) Runner-up
2008	Korea Open	(China) Lin Dan	4–21, 23–21, 25–23	(gold) Winner
2016	French Open	(China) Shi Yuqi	16–21, 19–21	(silver) Runner-up
2017	Denmark Open	(India) Srikanth Kidambi	10–21, 5–21	(silver) Runner-up

BWF Super Series Finals tournament
BWF Super Series Premier tournament
BWF Super Series tournament

=== BWF Grand Prix (18 titles, 11 runners-up) ===
The BWF Grand Prix had two levels, the BWF Grand Prix and Grand Prix Gold. It was a series of badminton tournaments sanctioned by the Badminton World Federation (BWF) which was held from 2007 to 2017. The World Badminton Grand Prix has been sanctioned by the International Badminton Federation from 1983 to 2006.

Men's singles
Year	Tournament	Opponent	Score	Result
2001	Japan Open	(Malaysia) Muhammad Roslin Hashim	11–15, 6–15	(silver) Runner-up
2001	U.S. Open	(Denmark) Kenneth Jonassen	6–8, 7–2, 7–2, 7–5	(gold) Winner
2002	Japan Open	(China) Xia Xuanze	5–7, 7–5, 0–7, 7–5, 7–2	(gold) Winner
2003	Swiss Open	(Denmark) Anders Boesen	15–10, 15–2	(gold) Winner
2003	Dutch Open	(Malaysia) Muhammad Hafiz Hashim	5–15, 15–8, 15–6	(gold) Winner
2003	German Open	(China) Lin Dan	15–4, 15–4	(gold) Winner
2005	Indonesia Open	(Thailand) Boonsak Ponsana	15–10, 15–3	(gold) Winner
2005	Chinese Taipei Open	(South Korea) Shon Seung-mo	15–13, 15–5	(gold) Winner
2006	All England Open	(China) Lin Dan	7–15, 7–15	(silver) Runner-up
2008	German Open	(Japan) Sho Sasaki	22–20, 21–5	(gold) Winner
2010	Macau Open	(Malaysia) Lee Chong Wei	No match	(silver) Runner-up
2011	Swiss Open	(South Korea) Park Sung-hwan	21–17, 9–21, 17–21	(silver) Runner-up
2011	Thailand Open	(China) Chen Long	8–21, 19–21	(silver) Runner-up
2011	Macau Open	(China) Du Pengyu	17–21, 21–11, 21–18	(gold) Winner
2011	Korea Grand Prix Gold	(South Korea) Shon Wan-ho	21–18, 21–16	(gold) Winner
2012	Swiss Open	(China) Chen Jin	21–14, 9–21, 17–21	(silver) Runner-up
2013	Korea Grand Prix Gold	(South Korea) Hong Ji-hoon	21–18, 21–12	(gold) Winner
2014	Canada Open	(Hong Kong) Ng Ka Long	21–16, 21–14	(gold) Winner
2014	Korea Grand Prix	(South Korea) Lee Dong-keun	18–21, 22–24	(silver) Runner-up
2015	Malaysia Masters	(South Korea) Jeon Hyeok-jin	19–21, 21–13, 21–15	(gold) Winner
2015	New Zealand Open	(China) Qiao Bin	21–12, 21–14	(gold) Winner
2015	Vietnam Open	(Indonesia) Tommy Sugiarto	19–21, 19–21	(silver) Runner-up
2015	Thailand Open	(Indonesia) Ihsan Maulana Mustofa	21–17, 22–24, 21–8	(gold) Winner
2015	Korea Masters	(South Korea) Lee Dong-keun	21–17, 14–21, 14–21	(silver) Runner-up
2015	U.S. Grand Prix	(England) Rajiv Ouseph	21–19, 21–12	(gold) Winner
2016	Thailand Masters	(Hong Kong) Hu Yun	21–18, 21–19	(gold) Winner
2016	Canada Open	(India) B. Sai Praneeth	12–21, 10–21	(silver) Runner-up
2016	U.S. Open	(Japan) Kanta Tsuneyama	24–22, 21–8	(gold) Winner
2017	Malaysia Masters	(Hong Kong) Ng Ka Long	21–14, 15–21, 9–10 retired	(silver) Runner-up

BWF Grand Prix Gold tournament
BWF Grand Prix tournament

=== BWF International Challenge/Series (5 titles, 3 runners-up) ===
Men's singles
Year	Tournament	Opponent	Score	Result
2000	Swedish Open	(Sweden) Rasmus Wengberg	12–15, 11–15	(silver) Runner-up
2000	Waitakere International	(Indonesia) Rio Suryana	15–8, 15–0	(gold) Winner
2005	Thailand Satellite	(South Korea) Shon Seung-mo	5–15, 3–15	(silver) Runner-up
2014	Sri Lanka International	(India) Anand Pawar	17–21, 21–10, 21–15	(gold) Winner
2014	Indonesia International	(Indonesia) Jonatan Christie	11–10, 9–11, 5–11, 11–8, 11–3	(gold) Winner
2014	Malaysia International	(Malaysia) Tan Chun Seang	17–21, 21–16, 21–11	(gold) Winner
2015	Thailand International	(Thailand) Suppanyu Avihingsanon	21–13, 21–10	(gold) Winner
2019	South Australia International	(Malaysia) Ng Tze Yong	21–23, 1–5 retired	(silver) Runner-up

BWF International Challenge tournament
BWF International Series tournament
