= Kasperi Salo =

Finnish badminton player (born 1979)

Kasperi Salo (born 3 October 1979 in Kerava) is a male badminton player from Finland.

Salo played badminton at the 2004 Summer Olympics in men's singles, losing in the first round.
