= Björn Joppien =

German badminton player (born 1981)

Personal information
- Born: January 30, 1981 (age 45) Langenfeld, West Germany
- Years active: 1997–2009
- Height: 1.92 m (6 ft 4 in)
- Weight: 85 kg (187 lb)

Sport
- Country: Germany
- Sport: Badminton
- Handedness: Left
- Coached by: Xu Yan Wang

Men's singles
- Highest ranking: 8
- BWF profile
Medal record
Men's badminton
Representing Germany
European Championships
Bronze medal – third place	2004 Geneva	Men's singles
European Mixed Team Championships
Bronze medal – third place	2004 Geneva	Mixed team
European Men's Team Championships
Silver medal – second place	2006 Thessalonica	Men's team
Bronze medal – third place	2008 Almere	Men's team
European Junior Championships
Gold medal – first place	1999 Glasgow	Boys' singles
Gold medal – first place	1999 Glasgow	Mixed team

Björn Joppien (born January 30, 1981) is a German badminton player.

== Career ==
Joppien played badminton at the 2004 Summer Olympics in men's singles, defeating Kasperi Salo of Finland in the first round. In the round of 16, Joppien was defeated by Ronald Susilo of Singapore.

In 2007, Joppien won the men's singles at the German National Badminton Championships.

In 2010, Joppien retired from professional badminton because he had recurrent back problems.
