= Hidetaka Yamada =

Japanese badminton player

Personal information
- Born: June 22, 1976 (age 50) Hyōgo Prefecture
- Height: 1.77 m (5 ft 10 in)
- Weight: 65 kg (143 lb)

Sport
- Country: Japan
- Sport: Badminton

Hidetaka Yamada (山田 英孝, Yamada Hidetaka; born June 22, 1976 in Hyogo, Japan) is a male badminton player from Japan.

Yamada played badminton at the 2000 Summer Olympics and 2004 Summer Olympics in men's singles, losing in the round of 32 to Taufik Hidayat of Indonesia in both times.

== Achievements ==
=== BWF International Challenge/Series ===
Men's singles
| Year | Tournament | Opponent | Score | Result | Ref. |
|---|---|---|---|---|---|
| 2002 | Western Australia International | (Japan) Yousuke Nakanishi | 7–0, 5–7, 4–7, 6–7 | (silver) Runner-up | |
| 2003 | Guatemala International | (Wales) Richard Vaughan | 15–11, 10–15, 8–15 | (silver) Runner-up | |
| 2004 | Finnish International | (Finland) Kasperi Salo | 15–13, 12–15, 15–8 | (gold) Winner | |
| 2004 | Croatian International | (Denmark) Joachim Persson | 4–15, 15–8, 15–13 | (gold) Winner | |

BWF International Series tournament
