= Ng Wei =

Hong Kong badminton player (born 1981)

Ng Wei 吳蔚
Personal information
- Born: 14 July 1981 (age 45) Jiangsu, China
- Height: 1.76 m (5 ft 9 in)

Sport
- Country: Hong Kong
- Sport: Badminton
- Handedness: Right
- Event: Men's singles

Men's singles
- BWF profile
Medal record
Men's badminton
Representing Hong Kong
Asian Championships
Bronze medal – third place	2005 Hyderabad	Men's singles
Bronze medal – third place	2003 Jakarta	Men's singles
Asian Junior Championships
Bronze medal – third place	1999 Yangon	Boys' singles

Ng Wei (simplified Chinese: 吴蔚; traditional Chinese: 吳蔚; pinyin: Wú Wèi; Jyutping: Ng4 Wai3; born 14 July 1981) is a former Hong Kong badminton player from Jiangsu. He competed in three consecutive Summer Olympics in 2000, 2004 and 2008. Ng was the bronze medalist at the 1999 Asian Junior Championships, also at the 2003 and 2005 Asian Championships. Ng retired from the international badminton in 2010, and now works as a badminton coach.

== Achievements ==
=== Asian Championships ===
Men's singles
Year	Venue	Opponent	Score	Result
2005	Gachibowli Indoor Stadium; Hyderabad, India	(Indonesia) Sony Dwi Kuncoro	3–15, 11–15	Bronze
2003	Tennis Indoor Gelora Bung Karno; Jakarta, Indonesia	(Indonesia) Taufik Hidayat	5–15, 5–15	Bronze

=== Asian Junior Championships ===
Boys' singles
Year	Venue	Opponent	Score	Result
1999	National Indoor Stadium – 1 Yangon, Myanmar	(China) Sang Yang	10–15, 15–10, 11–15	Bronze

=== IBF World Grand Prix (1 runner-up) ===
The World Badminton Grand Prix sanctioned by International Badminton Federation (IBF) since 1983.

Men's singles
Year	Tournament	Opponent	Score	Result
2004	Thailand Open	(Thailand) Boonsak Ponsana	3–15, 3–15	(silver) Runner-up

=== IBF International (5 titles, 1 runner-up) ===
Men's singles
Year	Tournament	Opponent	Score	Result
2003	Western Australia International	(Hong Kong) Yohan Hadikusumo Wiratama	15–7, 15–12	(gold) Winner
2000	Australia Capital International	(Australia) Rio Suryana	11–15, 15–3, 15–7	(gold) Winner
1999	Victoria International	(Hong Kong) Tam Kai Chuen	15–5, 15–6	(gold) Winner
1999	Argentina International	(Hong Kong) Tam Kai Chuen	9–15, 9–15	(silver) Runner-up
1999	Brazil International	(Norway) Jim Ronny Andersen	15–11, 15–9	(gold) Winner
1997	Australian International	(Australia) Murray Hocking	15–8, 15–11	(gold) Winner
