= Park Tae-sang =

South Korean badminton player and coach

Personal information
- Country: South Korea
- Born: 20 June 1979 (age 46); Busan, South Korea
- Height: 1.76 m (5 ft 9 in)
- Handedness: Right
Medal record
Men's badminton
Representing South Korea
Sudirman Cup
Bronze medal – third place	1999 Copenhagen	Mixed team
Bronze medal – third place	2007 Glasgow	Mixed team
Asian Games
Gold medal – first place	2002 Busan	Men's team
Asian Championships
Bronze medal – third place	2004 Kuala Lumpur	Men's singles
Asia Cup
Bronze medal – third place	1999 Ho Chi Minh	Men's team
- BWF profile

- Park Tae-sang
- Hangul: 박태상
- Hanja: 朴泰相
- RR: Bak Taesang
- MR: Pak T'aesang

Park Tae-sang (Korean: 박태상; born June 20, 1979) is a South Korean coach and former badminton player. After retiring as a badminton player, he decided to become a coach, starting his career with the South Korean national team and now coaches the Indian junior national team at the National Centre of Excellence in Guwahati, India.

== Career ==
=== 2004 ===
Park played badminton at the 2004 Summer Olympics in men's singles, defeating Abhinn Shyam Gupta of India and Bao Chunlai of China in the first two rounds. In the quarterfinals, Park was defeated by Soni Dwi Kuncoro of Indonesia 15-13, 15-4.

== Coaching career ==
Park started his career as a badminton coach at the South Korea national team, and served his country for five years, from 2013 to 2018. Park joined the India national team in 2019 where he coached P. V. Sindhu and helped her to win an Olympic bronze medal in 2020 Tokyo Olympic Games, and then the gold medal in 2022 Birmingham Commonwealth Games. He is currently based in Guwahati and trains the junior badminton players.

== Achievements ==
=== Asian Championships ===
Men's singles

Year	Venue	Opponent	Score	Result
2004	Kuala Lumpur Badminton Stadium, Kuala Lumpur, Malaysia	(Indonesia) Sony Dwi Kuncoro	13–15, 2–15	Bronze

=== IBF World Grand Prix ===
The World Badminton Grand Prix sanctioned by International Badminton Federation (IBF) since 1983.

Men's singles

Year	Tournament	Opponent	Score	Result
2003	Korea Open	(Denmark) Kenneth Jonassen	12–15, 15–17	(silver) Runner-up

=== BWF Grand Prix ===
The BWF Grand Prix had two levels, the BWF Grand Prix and Grand Prix Gold. It was a series of badminton tournaments sanctioned by the Badminton World Federation (BWF) which was held from 2007 to 2017.

Men's doubles

Year	Tournament	Partner	Opponent	Score	Result
2010	Australian Open	(South Korea) Kang Woo-kyum	(Japan) Hiroyuki Endo (Japan) Kenichi Hayakawa	15–21, 16–21	(silver) Runner-up

BWF Grand Prix Gold tournament
BWF Grand Prix tournament

=== IBF International ===
Men's singles

Year	Tournament	Opponent	Score	Result
2002	Malaysia Satellite	(Malaysia) Ramesh Nathan	15–5, 12–15, 15–1	(gold) Winner
