= Wong Choong Hann =

Malaysian badminton player (born 1977)

Wong Choong Hann 黄综翰
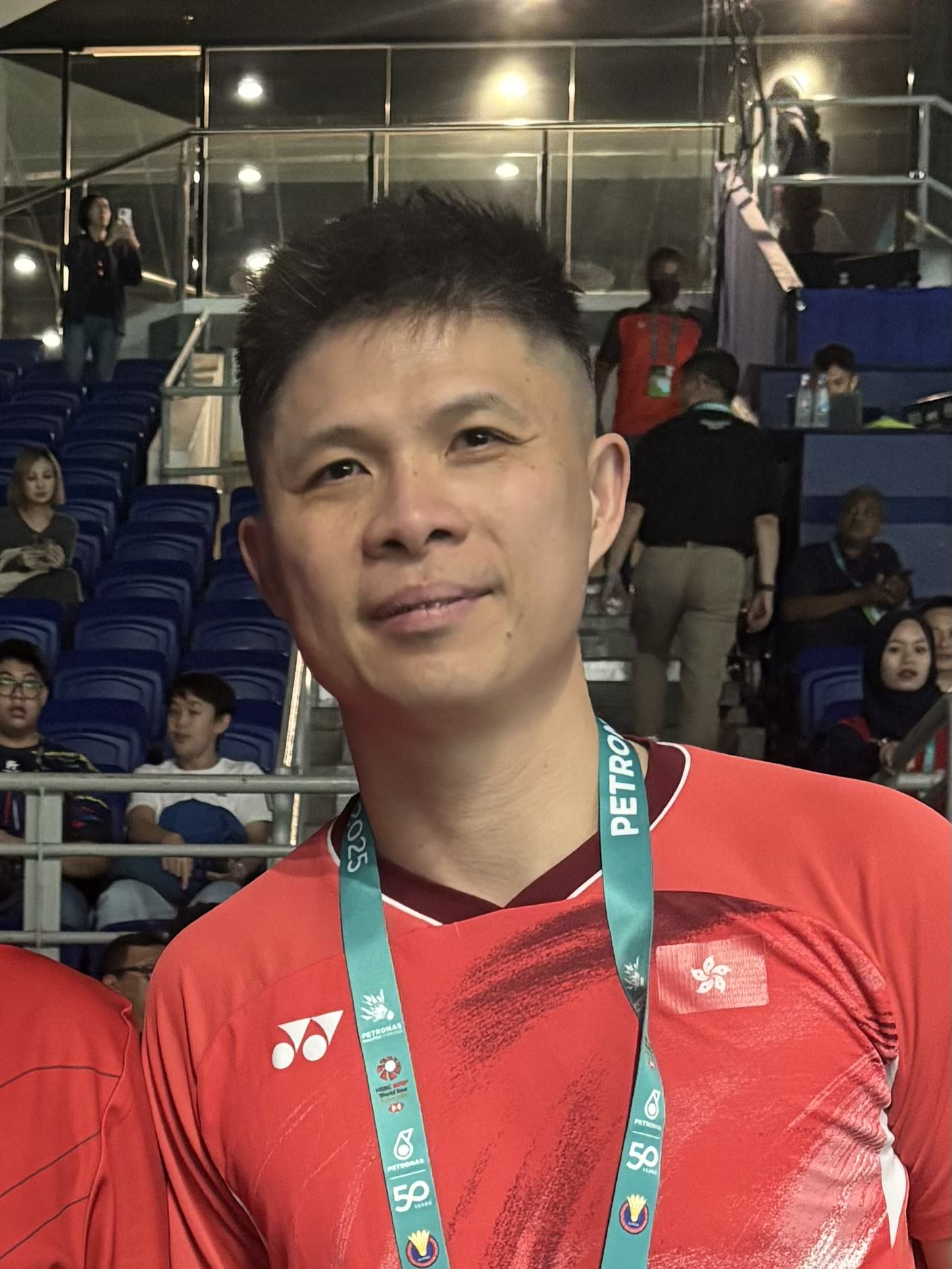
- Wong during the 2025 Malaysia Open

Personal information
- Born: 17 February 1977 (age 49) Kuala Lumpur, Malaysia
- Years active: 1996–2012
- Height: 1.83 m (6 ft 0 in)

Sport
- Country: Malaysia
- Sport: Badminton
- Handedness: Left

Men's singles
- Highest ranking: 1 (15 August 2002)
- BWF profile
Medal record
Men's badminton
Representing Malaysia
World Championships
Silver medal – second place	2003 Birmingham	Men's singles
Thomas Cup
Silver medal – second place	1998 Hong Kong	Men's team
Silver medal – second place	2002 Guangzhou	Men's team
Bronze medal – third place	2006 Sendai & Tokyo	Men's team
Bronze medal – third place	2008 Jakarta	Men's team
Bronze medal – third place	2010 Kuala Lumpur	Men's team
Commonwealth Games
Gold medal – first place	1998 Kuala Lumpur	Men's singles
Gold medal – first place	1998 Kuala Lumpur	Men's team
Gold medal – first place	2006 Melbourne	Mixed team
Bronze medal – third place	2002 Manchester	Men's singles
Silver medal – second place	2006 Melbourne	Men's singles
Silver medal – second place	2006 Melbourne	Men's doubles
Asian Games
Bronze medal – third place	1998 Bangkok	Men's team
Bronze medal – third place	2002 Busan	Men's team
Bronze medal – third place	2006 Doha	Men's team
Asia Cup
Silver medal – second place	1997 Jakarta	Men's team
SEA Games
Gold medal – first place	2001 Kuala Lumpur	Men's team
Gold medal – first place	2005 Manila	Men's team
Silver medal – second place	1999 Bandar Seri Begawan	Men's singles
Silver medal – second place	1999 Bandar Seri Begawan	Men's team
Silver medal – second place	2003 Vietnam	Men's singles
Bronze medal – third place	2001 Kuala Lumpur	Men's doubles
Bronze medal – third place	2003 Vietnam	Men's team
Bronze medal – third place	2005 Manila	Men's doubles
World Junior Championships
Bronze medal – third place	1994 Kuala Lumpur	Boys' doubles

Wong Choong Hann AMN (simplified Chinese: 黄综翰; traditional Chinese: 黃綜翰; pinyin: Huáng Zōnghàn; born 17 February 1977) is a Malaysian former badminton player. He was the first Malaysian to win a medal in the men's singles event at the BWF World Championships. He resigned as the coaching director for the Malaysia national badminton team in June 2023.

== Career ==
Wong Choong Hann's career began with the 1996 Malaysia Open. The first tournament he won was the 1997 Dutch Open. He represented Malaysia in 2002, where Malaysia emerged runners-up to Indonesia in the Thomas Cup championships.

In 2003, Wong reached the World Championships finals. In a thrilling three-set match between the veterans (both he and his opponent were above 24 years old then), he eventually lost out to the champion from China, Xia Xuanze.

Wong played badminton at the 2004 Summer Olympics in men's singles, defeating Przemysław Wacha of Poland in the first round. In the round of 16, he was defeated by Taufik Hidayat of Indonesia.

The low point of his career occurred during the 2006 Thomas Cup when he injured himself by snapping an achilles tendon while playing in a quarter final match against South Korea, and was required to rest for almost 6 months. He made a comeback to the sport in the Asian Games later in 2006 but was clearly off form.

In the 2008 Summer Olympics he defeated reigning Olympic champion Taufik Hidayat but once again failed to advance past the round of 16, losing to Hsieh Yu-hsing of Chinese Taipei.

He has set up a company "Pioneer Sdn Bhd" with former shuttlers Lee Wan Wah, Chan Chong Ming, and Chew Choon Eng to conduct badminton programmes and hopefully produce world-class shuttlers for Malaysia.

In May 2010, Wong was called back to play for the Malaysian Thomas Cup squad.

In 2011 he played his last world championship, where he lost to Boonsak Ponsana in the second round.

== Personal life ==
Wong Choong Hann married Leaw Pik Sim on 11 June 2005. They have a daughter, named Kyra Wong Xinyue, and a son, named Kayden Wong Zixuan. He currently resides in Sri Petaling, Kuala Lumpur. In September 2012, he co-founded LavieFlo International—the first preserved flower retailer in Malaysia.

== Achievements ==
=== World Championships ===
Men's singles
Year	Venue	Opponent	Score	Result
2003	National Indoor Arena, Birmingham, England	(China) Xia Xuanze	6–15, 15–13, 6–15	Silver

=== Commonwealth Games ===
Men's singles
Year	Venue	Opponent	Score	Result
1998	Kuala Lumpur Badminton Stadium, Kuala Lumpur, Malaysia	(Malaysia) Yong Hock Kin	10–15, 15–12, 15–6	(gold) Gold
2002	Bolton Arena, Manchester, England	(Malaysia) Muhammad Hafiz Hashim	8–6, 6–8, 0–7, 8–7, 3–7	Bronze
2006	Melbourne Convention and Exhibition Centre, Melbourne, Australia	(Malaysia) Lee Chong Wei	13–21, 12–21	Silver

Men's doubles
Year	Venue	Partner	Opponent	Score	Result
2006	Melbourne Convention and Exhibition Centre, Melbourne, Australia	(Malaysia) Choong Tan Fook	(Malaysia) Chan Chong Ming (Malaysia) Koo Kien Keat	13–21, 14–21	Silver

=== SEA Games ===
Men's singles
Year	Venue	Opponent	Score	Result
1999	Hassanal Bolkiah Sports Complex, Bandar Seri Begawan, Brunei	(Indonesia) Taufik Hidayat	10–15, 15–11, 11–15	Silver
2003	Tan Binh Sport Center, Ho Chi Minh City, Vietnam	(Indonesia) Sony Dwi Kuncoro	8–15, 5–15	Silver

Men's doubles
Year	Venue	Partner	Opponent	Score	Result
2001	Malawati Stadium, Selangor, Malaysia	(Malaysia) Lee Wan Wah	(Indonesia) Sigit Budiarto (Indonesia) Candra Wijaya	4–15, 5–15	Bronze
2005	PhilSports Arena, Pasig, Philippines	(Malaysia) Choong Tan Fook	(Indonesia) Luluk Hadiyanto (Indonesia) Alvent Yulianto	10–15, 2–15	Bronze

=== World Junior Championships ===
Boys' doubles
Year	Venue	Partner	Opponent	Score	Result
1994	Kuala Lumpur Badminton Stadium; Kuala Lumpur, Malaysia	(Malaysia) Loo Yiew Loong	(Denmark) Peter Gade (Denmark) Peder Nissen	14–17, 6–15	Bronze

=== BWF Superseries ===
The BWF Superseries, which was launched on 14 December 2006 and implemented in 2007, is a series of elite badminton tournaments, sanctioned by the Badminton World Federation (BWF). BWF Superseries levels are Superseries and Superseries Premier. A season of Superseries consists of twelve tournaments around the world that have been introduced since 2011. Successful players are invited to the Superseries Finals, which are held at the end of each year.

Men's singles
Year	Tournament	Opponent	Score	Result
2007	China Masters	(China) Lin Dan	19–21, 9–21	(silver) Runner-up

BWF Super Series Finals tournament
BWF Super Series Premier tournament
BWF Super Series tournament

=== BWF Grand Prix ===
The BWF Grand Prix had two levels, the BWF Grand Prix and Grand Prix Gold. It was a series of badminton tournaments sanctioned by the Badminton World Federation (BWF) which was held from 2007 to 2017. The World Badminton Grand Prix has been sanctioned by International Badminton Federation (IBF) from 1983 to 2006.

Men's singles
Year	Tournament	Opponent	Score	Result
1997	Dutch Open	(Germany) Oliver Pongratz	15–10, 15–11	(gold) Winner
1999	Malaysia Open	(China) Luo Yigang	16–17, 15–17	(silver) Runner-up
1999	Denmark Open	(Denmark) Poul-Erik Høyer Larsen	15–17, 4–15	(silver) Runner-up
2000	Chinese Taipei Open	(Denmark) Peter Gade	9–15, 5–15	(silver) Runner-up
2001	Singapore Open	(Indonesia) Taufik Hidayat	5–7, 7–0, 1–7, 7–1, 4–7	(silver) Runner-up
2001	China Open	(China) Xia Xuanze	3–7, 7–3, 2–7, 7–5, 4–7	(silver) Runner-up
2002	Dutch Open	(Malaysia) Lee Tsuen Seng	15–6, 15–6	(gold) Winner
2002	China Open	(China) Chen Hong	12–15, 15–5, 15–9	(gold) Winner
2003	Chinese Taipei Open	(Indonesia) Sony Dwi Kuncoro	3–15, 15–7, 15–4	(gold) Winner
2003	China Open	(China) Lin Dan	16–17, 12–15	(silver) Runner-up
2007	New Zealand Open	(Indonesia) Andre Kurniawan Tedjono	21–13, 18–21, 14–21	(silver) Runner-up
2009	Macau Open	(Malaysia) Lee Chong Wei	15–21, 19–21	(silver) Runner-up
2009	Chinese Taipei Open	(Vietnam) Nguyen Tien Minh	11–21, 14–21	(silver) Runner-up
2010	Malaysia Grand Prix Gold	(Malaysia) Lee Chong Wei	8–21, 21–14, 15–21	(silver) Runner-up
2011	Australia Open	(Japan) Sho Sasaki	11–21, 21–12, 19–21	(silver) Runner-up

BWF Grand Prix Gold tournament
BWF Grand Prix tournament

== Honour ==
- Member of the Order of the Defender of the Realm (AMN) (2000).
