= Muhammad Hafiz Hashim =

Malaysian badminton player

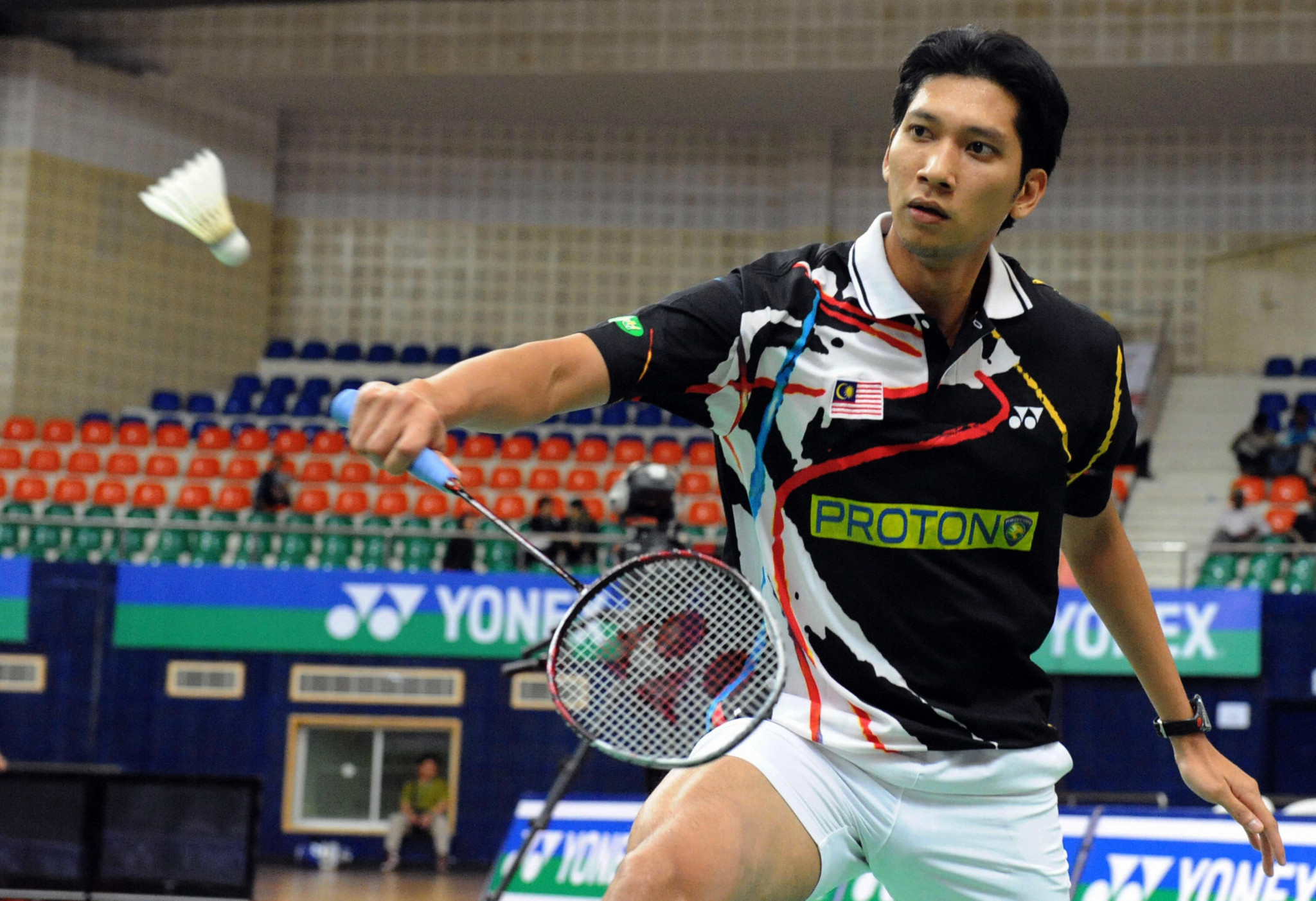
- Hafiz Hashim at the 2008 Malaysia Open

Personal information
- Born: Muhammad Hafiz bin Hashim; 13 September 1982 (age 44) Kota Bharu, Kelantan, Malaysia
- Years active: 2000–2012
- Height: 1.88 m (6 ft 2 in)
- Weight: 74 kg (163 lb)

Sport
- Country: Malaysia
- Sport: Badminton
- Handedness: Right

Men's singles
- Highest ranking: 5
- BWF profile
Medal record
Men's badminton
Representing Malaysia
Sudirman Cup
Bronze medal – third place	2009 Guangzhou	Mixed team
Thomas Cup
Silver medal – second place	2002 Guangzhou	Men's team
Bronze medal – third place	2006 Sendai & Tokyo	Men's team
Bronze medal – third place	2008 Jakarta	Men's team
Bronze medal – third place	2010 Kuala Lumpur	Men's team
Commonwealth Games
Gold medal – first place	2002 Manchester	Men's singles
Gold medal – first place	2010 Delhi	Mixed team
Asian Games
Bronze medal – third place	2002 Busan	Men's team
Bronze medal – third place	2006 Doha	Men's team
Southeast Asian Games
Gold medal – first place	2005 Manila	Men's team
Silver medal – second place	2009 Vientiane	Men's team
Bronze medal – third place	2005 Manila	Men's singles

Muhammad Hafiz bin Hashim AMN (born 13 September 1982) is a former Malaysian badminton player who currently works as a coach. His biggest success was winning the 2003 All England Open Badminton Championships.

== Achievements ==
=== Southeast Asian Games ===
Men's singles
Year	Venue	Opponent	Score	Result
2005	PhilSports Arena; Pasig, Philippines	(Indonesia) Sony Dwi Kuncoro	11–15, 1–15	Bronze

=== Commonwealth Games ===
Men's singles
Year	Venue	Opponent	Score	Result
2002	Bolton Arena; Manchester, England	(Malaysia) Lee Tsuen Seng	7–3, 7–1, 3–7, 7–8, 7–4	Gold

=== BWF Grand Prix ===
The BWF Grand Prix has two levels, the BWF Grand Prix and Grand Prix Gold. It is a series of badminton tournaments sanctioned by the Badminton World Federation (BWF) since 2007. The World Badminton Grand Prix sanctioned by International Badminton Federation (IBF) from 1983 to 2006.

Men's singles
Year	Tournament	Opponent	Score	Result
2003	All England Open	(China) Chen Hong	17–14, 15–10	(gold) Winner
2003	Dutch Open	(South Korea) Lee Hyun-il	15–5, 8–15, 6–15	(silver) Runner-up
2005	German Open	(China) Lin Dan	8–15, 8–15	(silver) Runner-up
2005	Swiss Open	(Denmark) Peter Gade	17–14, 15–10	(gold) Winner
2005	Thailand Open	(Denmark) Kenneth Jonassen	15–13, 15–13	(gold) Winner
2005	Dutch Open	(Japan) Shoji Sato	15–4, 15–12	(gold) Winner
2005	Denmark Open	(Malaysia) Lee Chong Wei	14–17, 8–15	(silver) Runner-up
2006	Philippines Open	(Malaysia) Roslin Hashim	21–19, 21–7	(gold) Winner
2009	India Open	(Indonesia) Taufik Hidayat	18–21, 19–21	(silver) Runner-up

BWF Grand Prix Gold tournament
BWF Grand Prix tournament

== Coaching career ==
He joined the Suchitra Academy in Hyderabad in February 2023 on a three-year contract after leaving the Academy Badminton Malaysia coaching lineup in December. He coached Indian badminton superstar, P. V. Sindhu from July until December 2023.

== Personal life ==
He studied at Sekolah Kebangsaan Sultan Ismail before transferring to Kuala Lumpur. Hafiz had also studied at Sekolah Menengah Kebangsaan Pintu Geng and Sultan Ismail College.

Hafiz achieved worldwide fame by winning the All England Open Badminton Championships in 2003. He is one of the most successful Malay badminton players aside from the Sidek brothers. Hafiz was among those coached by Misbun Sidek, the eldest of the Sidek brothers and a former national singles coach.

On court, Hafiz was known for his calmness regardless of who his opponent was. He is the younger brother of Roslin Hashim, a former world No.1.

== Honour ==
- Malaysia
  - Member of the Order of the Defender of the Realm (A.M.N.) (2005)
