= Chen Hong (badminton) =

Chinese badminton player

Chen Hong 陈宏
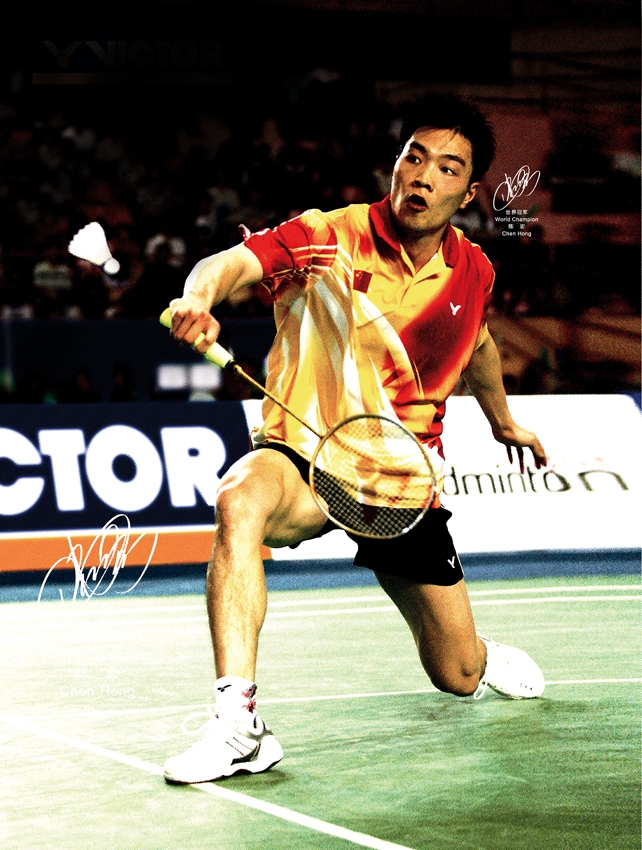

Personal information
- Born: 28 November 1979 (age 46) Changting County, Fujian, China
- Height: 1.82 m (6 ft 0 in)

Sport
- Country: China
- Sport: Badminton
- Handedness: Right

Men's singles
- Highest ranking: 1 (2002)
- BWF profile
Medal record
Men's badminton
Representing China
World Championships
Bronze medal – third place	2001 Seville	Men's singles
Bronze medal – third place	2006 Madrid	Men's singles
World Cup
Bronze medal – third place	2005 Yiyang	Men's singles
Sudirman Cup
Gold medal – first place	2005 Beijing	Mixed team
Gold medal – first place	2001 Seville	Mixed team
Silver medal – second place	2003 Eindhoven	Mixed team
Thomas Cup
Gold medal – first place	2006 Sendai & Tokyo	Men's team
Gold medal – first place	2004 Jakarta	Men's team
Asian Games
Bronze medal – third place	2002 Busan	Men's team
Asia Championships
Gold medal – first place	1999 Kuala Lumpur	Men's singles
Silver medal – second place	2007 Johor Bahru	Men's singles
Bronze medal – third place	2002 Bangkok	Men's singles
Asia Cup
Gold medal – first place	2001 Singapore	Men's team
Summer Universiade
Silver medal – second place	2007 Bangkok	Men's singles
Silver medal – second place	2007 Bangkok	Mixed team
Bronze medal – third place	2007 Bangkok	Mixed doubles
Asia Junior Championships
Gold medal – first place	1997 Manila	Boys' team
Silver medal – second place	1997 Manila	Boys' singles
Bronze medal – third place	1997 Manila	Boys' doubles
- Updated on 15:05, 23 October 2013 (UTC)

Chen Hong
- Traditional Chinese: 陳宏
- Simplified Chinese: 陈宏
Transcriptions
Standard Mandarin
- Hanyu Pinyin: Chén Hóng

Chen Hong (陈宏; born November 28, 1979, in Changting County, Fujian) is a former Chinese badminton player.

== Career ==
During the early 21st century, Chen was among the world’s top singles badminton players, attaining the world number one ranking in 2002–2003. He first gained international prominence at age 19, winning both the Swedish Open and the Asian Championships in 1999. His subsequent titles included the Dutch (2000), Singapore (2002, 2003), Denmark (2002, 2006), Malaysia (2003), China (2005, 2006), and Thailand (2007) Opens. He also won the prestigious All-England Championships twice, in 2002 and 2005, defeating his compatriot Lin Dan in the latter final. He played in the All England 6 consecutive times between 2001 and 2006, his first All England reached the final, losing out to Indian player Pullela Gopichand, 15–12 15–6. His performances at IBF World Championships and at the 2004 Olympic Games were not among his finest. He was a bronze medalist (semifinalist) at the 2001 and 2006 World Championships and was eliminated in the quarterfinals of the Games in Athens. At the 2006 IBF World Championships Chen recorded a 303 km/h jump smash against Taufik Hidayat. He retired from competitive play in 2007.

== Achievements ==
=== World Championships ===
Men's singles
Year	Venue	Opponent	Score	Result
2001	Palacio de Deportes de San Pablo; Seville, Spain	(Denmark) Peter Gade	14–17, 2–15	Bronze
2006	Palacio de Deportes de la Comunidad de Madrid; Madrid, Spain	(China) Lin Dan	21–15, 19–21, 14–21	Bronze

=== World Cup ===
Men's singles
Year	Venue	Opponent	Score	Result
2005	Yiyang, China	(China) Lin Dan	14–21, 21–6, 6–21	Bronze

=== Asian Championships ===
Men's singles
Year	Venue	Opponent	Score	Result
1999	Kuala Lumpur, Malaysia	(Malaysia) Ong Ewe Hock	15–11, 15–8	Gold
2002	Bangkok, Thailand	(Indonesia) Sony Dwi Kuncoro	5–15, 11–15	Bronze
2007	Stadium Bandaraya Johor Bahru; Johor Bahru, Malaysia	(Indonesia) Taufik Hidayat	18–21, 19–21	Silver

=== Asian Junior Championships ===
Boys' singles
Year	Venue	Opponent	Score	Result
1997	Ninoy Aquino Stadium; Manila, Philippines	(Indonesia) Taufik Hidayat	11–15, 2–15	Silver

Boys' doubles
Year	Venue	Partner	Opponent	Score	Result
1997	Ninoy Aquino Stadium; Manila, Philippines	(China) Xia Xuanze	(China) Cai Yun (China) Zhang Yi	6–15, 6–15	Bronze

=== BWF/IBF World Grand Prix (12 titles, 11 runners-up) ===
The BWF Grand Prix had two levels, the BWF Grand Prix and Grand Prix Gold. It was a series of badminton tournaments sanctioned by the Badminton World Federation (BWF) which was held from 2007 to 2017. The World Badminton Grand Prix sanctioned by International Badminton Federation (IBF) from 1983 to 2006.

Men's singles
Year	Tournament	Opponent	Score	Result
1999	Swedish Open	(Sweden) Rasmus Wengberg	17–15, 15–0	(gold) Winner
2000	Dutch Open	(Malaysia) Roslin Hashim	15–11, 15–17, 15–7	(gold) Winner
2001	All England Open	(India) Pullela Gopichand	12–15, 6–15	(silver) Runner-up
2002	All England Open	(Indonesia) Budi Santoso	7–4, 7–5, 7–1	(gold) Winner
2002	Singapore Open	(Singapore) Ronald Susilo	15–4, 15–1	(gold) Winner
2002	Indonesia Open	(Indonesia) Taufik Hidayat	12–15, 12–15	(silver) Runner-up
2002	Denmark Open	(Denmark) Kenneth Jonassen	15–9, 9–15, 15–6	(gold) Winner
2002	China Open	(Malaysia) Wong Choong Hann	15–12, 5–15, 9–15	(silver) Runner-up
2003	All England Open	(Malaysia) Hafiz Hashim	14–17, 10–15	(silver) Runner-up
2003	Singapore Open	(China) Chen Yu	11–15, 15–8, 15–4	(gold) Winner
2003	Indonesia Open	(Indonesia) Taufik Hidayat	9–15, 9–15	(silver) Runner-up
2003	Malaysia Open	(Malaysia) Lee Chong Wei	15–9, 15–5	(gold) Winner
2004	Korea Open	(China) Xia Xuanze	9–15, 15–17	(silver) Runner-up
2004	Indonesia Open	(Indonesia) Taufik Hidayat	10–15, 11–15	(silver) Runner-up
2005	All England Open	(China) Lin Dan	8–15, 15–5, 15–2	(gold) Winner
2005	Japan Open	(China) Lin Dan	4–15, 0–2; retired	(silver) Runner-up
2005	Singapore Open	(Indonesia) Taufik Hidayat	9–15, 3–15	(silver) Runner-up
2005	China Open	(China) Bao Chunlai	15–12, 8–15, 15–9	(gold) Winner
2006	German Open	(China) Chen Jin	3–15, 7–15	(silver) Runner-up
2006	China Open	(China) Bao Chunlai	21–17, 21–19	(gold) Winner
2006	Denmark Open	(China) Chen Yu	21–18, 21–18	(gold) Winner
2007	Thailand Open	(Thailand) Boonsak Ponsana	21–14, 11–21, 23–21	(gold) Winner
2007	Philippines Open	(Malaysia) Lee Chong Wei	9–21, 15–21	(silver) Runner-up

BWF Grand Prix Gold tournament
BWF Grand Prix tournament

=== IBF International (1 title) ===
Men's singles
Year	Tournament	Opponent	Score	Result
1996	Iran Fajr International	(China) Zhang Jun	15–3, 15–13	(gold) Winner
