= Rasmus Wengberg =

Swedish badminton player

Personal information
- Born: 2 December 1974 (age 51) Västra Ingelstad, Skåne, Sweden
- Height: 1.8 m (5 ft 11 in)

Sport
- Country: Sweden
- Sport: Badminton
- Handedness: Right
- BWF profile
Medal record
Men's badminton
Representing Sweden
European Championships
Bronze medal – third place	2002 Malmö	Men's singles
European Junior Championships
Silver medal – second place	1993 Sofia	Boys' singles
Silver medal – second place	1993 Sofia	Mixed team
Bronze medal – third place	1993 Sofia	Boys' doubles

Rasmus Wengberg (born 2 December 1974) is a Swedish badminton player who was the bronze medalist in the 2002 European Championships in Malmö.

He also competed for Sweden at the 2000 Summer Olympics.

Born and raised in Skåne, Wengberg played until 2005 for IFK umeå. For a few years, he played for a German team, but nowadays he plays for IFK Umeå in Sweden, working as a teacher while not pursuing his badminton career. Now he is a teacher at Prolympia (school).
