= Badminton at the 2004 Summer Olympics =

Badminton at the Games of the XXVIII Olympiad
- Venue: Goudi Olympic Hall
- Dates: 14 – 21 August 2004
- No. of events: 5 (2 men, 2 women, 1 mixed)
- Competitors: 168 from 31 nations

Badminton at the 2004 Summer Olympics was held at the Goudi Olympic Hall at the Goudi Olympic Complex from 14 August through 21 August. Both men and women competed in their own singles and doubles events and together they competed in a mixed doubles event.

== Medalists ==
Event	Gold	Silver	Bronze
Men's singles	Taufik Hidayat; Indonesia	Shon Seung-mo; South Korea	Sony Dwi Kuncoro; Indonesia
Men's doubles	Ha Tae-kwon and Kim Dong-moon; South Korea	Lee Dong-soo and Yoo Yong-sung; South Korea	Eng Hian and Flandy Limpele; Indonesia
Women's singles	Zhang Ning; China	Mia Audina; Netherlands	Zhou Mi; China
Women's doubles	Yang Wei and Zhang Jiewen; China	Gao Ling and Huang Sui; China	Lee Kyung-won and Ra Kyung-min; South Korea
Mixed doubles	Zhang Jun and Gao Ling; China	Nathan Robertson and Gail Emms; Great Britain	Jens Eriksen and Mette Schjoldager; Denmark

== Medal table ==
Rank	Nation	Gold	Silver	Bronze	Total
1	China	3	1	1	5
2	South Korea	1	2	1	4
3	Indonesia	1	0	2	3
4	Great Britain	0	1	0	1
4	Netherlands	0	1	0	1
6	Denmark	0	0	1	1
Totals (6 entries)		5	5	5	15

== Results ==
=== Men's singles ===
Quarterfinals
(Singapore) Ronald Susilo	10	1
(Thailand) Boonsak Ponsana	15	15
(Indonesia) Taufik Hidayat	15	15
6	(Denmark) Peter Gade	12	12
8	(Indonesia) Sony Dwi Kuncoro	15	15
(South Korea) Park Tae-sang	13	4
7	(South Korea) Shon Seung-mo	10	15	15
2	(China) Chen Hong	15	4	10

Semifinals
(Thailand) Boonsak Ponsana	9	2
(Indonesia) Taufik Hidayat	15	15
8	(Indonesia) Sony Dwi Kuncoro	6	15	9
7	(South Korea) Shon Seung-mo	15	9	15

Finals
(Indonesia) Taufik Hidayat	15	15
7	(South Korea) Shon Seung-mo	8	7
Third place
8	(Indonesia) Sony Dwi Kuncoro	15	17
(Thailand) Boonsak Ponsana	11	16

=== Women's singles ===
Quarterfinals
(China) Gong Ruina	11	11
(Chinese Taipei) Cheng Shao-chieh	3	3
(Netherlands) Mia Audina	11	11
(United Kingdom) Tracey Hallam	0	9
(Bulgaria) Petya Nedelcheva	4	1
(China) Zhou Mi	11	11
(Hong Kong) Wang Chen	11	6	7
(China) Zhang Ning	9	11	11

Semifinals
(China) Gong Ruina	4	2
(Netherlands) Mia Audina	11	11
(China) Zhou Mi	6	4
(China) Zhang Ning	11	11

Finals
(Netherlands) Mia Audina	11	6	7
(China) Zhang Ning	8	11	11
Third place
(China) Gong Ruina	2	11	6
(China) Zhou Mi	11	8	11

=== Men's doubles ===
Quarterfinals
(South Korea) Yim Bang-eun (South Korea) Kim Yong-hyun	1	10
8	(Indonesia) Flandy Limpele (Indonesia) Eng Hian	15	15
3	(South Korea) Ha Tae-kwon (South Korea) Kim Dong-moon	15	15
6	(China) Sang Y (China) Zheng B	7	11
(South Korea) Lee Dong-soo (South Korea) Yoo Yong-sung	11	15	15
4	(Malaysia) Choong Tan Fook (Malaysia) Lee Wan Wah	15	11	9
5	(Denmark) Jens Eriksen (Denmark) M. Lundgaard Hansen	3	15	15
2	(China) Fu Haifeng (China) Cai Yun	15	11	8

Semifinals
8	(Indonesia) Flandy Limpele (Indonesia) Eng Hian	8	2
3	(South Korea) Ha Tae-kwon (South Korea) Kim Dong-moon	15	15
(South Korea) Lee Dong-soo (South Korea) Yoo Yong-sung	9	15	15
5	(Denmark) Jens Eriksen (Denmark) M. Lundgaard Hansen	15	5	3

Finals
3	(South Korea) Ha Tae-kwon (South Korea) Kim Dong-moon	15	15
(South Korea) Lee Dong-soo (South Korea) Yoo Yong-sung	11	4
Third place
8	(Indonesia) Flandy Limpele (Indonesia) Eng Hian	15	15
5	(Denmark) Jens Eriksen (Denmark) M. Lundgaard Hansen	13	7

=== Women's doubles ===
Quarterfinals
1	(China) Yang Wei (China) Zhang Jiewen	15	15
(Thailand) Saralee Thungthongkam (Thailand) S. Chankrachangwong	2	4
3	(South Korea) Ra Kyung-min (South Korea) Lee Kyung-won	15	15
5	(Netherlands) Lotte Bruil (Netherlands) Mia Audina	5	2
6	(South Korea) Hwang Yu-mi (South Korea) Lee Hyo-jung	15	6	13
4	(China) Wei Yili (China) Zhao Tingting	8	15	15
7	(Denmark) Rikke Olsen (Denmark) Ann-Lou Jørgensen	6	7
2	(China) Gao Ling (China) Huang Sui	15	15

Semifinals
1	(China) Yang Wei (China) Zhang Jiewen	15	15
3	(South Korea) Ra Kyung-min (South Korea) Lee Kyung-won	6	4
4	(China) Wei Yili (China) Zhao Tingting	10	14
3	(China) Gao Ling (China) Huang Sui	15	17

Finals
1	(China) Yang Wei (China) Zhang Jiewen	7	15	15
2	(China) Gao Ling (China) Huang Sui	15	4	8
Third place
3	(South Korea) Ra Kyung-min (South Korea) Lee Kyung-won	10	15	15
4	(China) Wei Yili (China) Zhao Tingting	15	9	7

=== Mixed doubles ===
Quarterfinals
1	(South Korea) Kim Dong-moon (South Korea) Ra Kyung-min	14	8
7	(Denmark) Jonas Rasmussen (Denmark) Rikke Olsen	17	15
4	(United Kingdom) Nathan Robertson (United Kingdom) Gail Emms	15	17
6	(China) Chen Qiqiu (China) Zhao Tingting	8	15
8	(Indonesia) Nova Widianto (Indonesia) Vita Marissa	12	8
(Denmark) Jens Eriksen (Denmark) Mette Schjoldager	15	15
(Sweden) Fredrik Bergström (Sweden) Johanna Persson	3	1
2	(China) Zhang Jun (China) Gao Ling	15	15

Semifinals
7	(Denmark) Jonas Rasmussen (Denmark) Rikke Olsen	6	12
4	(United Kingdom) Nathan Robertson (United Kingdom) Gail Emms	15	15
(Denmark) Jens Eriksen (Denmark) Mette Schjoldager	9	5
2	(China) Zhang Jun (China) Gao Ling	15	15

Finals
4	(United Kingdom) Nathan Robertson (United Kingdom) Gail Emms	1	15	12
2	(China) Zhang Jun (China) Gao Ling	15	12	15
Third place
7	(Denmark) Jonas Rasmussen (Denmark) Rikke Olsen	5	5
(Denmark) Jens Eriksen (Denmark) Mette Schjoldager	15	15

== Participating nations ==
A total of 31 nations competed in the four different badminton events at the 2004 Summer Olympics.

- Australia (6)
- Bulgaria (2)
- Canada (7)
- China (18)
- Chinese Taipei (5)
- Denmark (12)
- Finland (3)
- France (3)
- Germany (6)
- Great Britain (11)
- Greece (2)
- Guatemala (1)
- Hong Kong (5)
- India (3)
- Indonesia (14)
- Jamaica (1)
- Japan (11)
- Malaysia (6)
- Netherlands (4)
- New Zealand (2)
- Norway (1)
- Peru (1)
- Poland (3)
- Russia (2)
- Singapore (3)
- South Africa (6)
- South Korea (15)
- Spain (2)
- Sweden (3)
- Thailand (8)
- United States (2)
