= 2006 Swiss Open (badminton) =

Tournament details
- Dates: January 3, 2006 – January 8, 2006
- Edition: 45th
- Level: World Grand Prix 4 Stars
- Total prize money: US$120,000
- Venue: St. Jakobshalle
- Location: Basel, Switzerland

Champions
- Men's singles: (Malaysia) Lee Chong Wei
- Women's singles: (Germany) Huaiwen Xu
- Men's doubles: (Malaysia) Chan Chong Ming (Malaysia) Koo Kien Keat
- Women's doubles: (China) Du Jing (China) Yu Yang
- Mixed doubles: (England) Nathan Robertson (England) Gail Emms

The 2006 Swiss Open (officially known as the Wilson Swiss Open 2006 for sponsorship reasons) was badminton tournament which took place at the St. Jakobshalle in Basel, Switzerland, on from 3 to 8 January 2006 and had a total purse of $120,000.

== Tournament ==
The 2006 Swiss Open was the first tournament of the 2006 IBF World Grand Prix and also part of the Swiss Open championships, which had been held since 1955.

=== Venue ===
This international tournament was held at St. Jakobshalle in Basel, Switzerland.

=== Point distribution ===
Below is the point distribution table for each phase of the tournament based on the IBF points system for the IBF World Grand Prix 4-star event.

Winner	Runner-up	3/4	5/8	9/16	17/32	33/64
4,200	3,570	2,940	2,310	1,680	1,050	420

=== Prize pool ===
The total prize money for this tournament was US$120,000. The distribution of the prize money was in accordance with IBF regulations.

Event	Winner	Finalist	Semi-finals	Quarter-finals	Last 16
Men's singles	$9,600	$4,800	$2,400	$1,200	$480
Women's singles	$8,280	$3,960	$2,160	$1,080	—N/a
Men's doubles	$8,640	$4,800	$2,880	$1,680	—N/a
Women's doubles	$7,320	$4,800	$2,640	$1,320	—N/a
Mixed doubles	$7,320	$4,800	$2,640	$1,320	—N/a

== Men's singles ==
=== Seeds ===
1. (Malaysia) Lee Chong Wei (champion)
2. (Denmark) Peter Gade (semi-finals)
3. (Malaysia) Muhammad Hafiz Hashim (second round)
4. (South Korea) Lee Hyun-il (quarter-finals)
5. (Malaysia) Wong Choong Hann (semi-finals)
6. (Malaysia) Kuan Beng Hong (quarter-finals)
7. (South Korea) Shon Seung-mo (quarter-finals)
8. (Denmark) Niels Christian Kaldau (quarter-finals)
9. (Malaysia) Sairul Amar Ayob (third round)
10. (South Korea) Park Sung-hwan (third round)
11. (Netherlands) Dicky Palyama (second round)
12. (Netherlands) Eric Pang (second round)
13. (New Zealand) Geoff Bellingham (first round)
14. (Poland) Przemysław Wacha (second round)
15. (Germany) Björn Joppien (first round)
16. (Canada) Bobby Milroy (second round)

=== Finals ===
Semi-finals
1	(Malaysia) Lee Chong Wei	12	15	15
5	(Malaysia) Wong Choong Hann	15	2	3
(China) Xia Xuanze	15	15
2	(Denmark) Peter Gade	2	12

Final
1	(Malaysia) Lee Chong Wei	15	15
(China) Xia Xuanze	8	0

=== Top half ===
==== Section 1 ====
First Round
(Denmark) M Christensen	15	15
(Germany) C Hückstädt	7	7
10	(South Korea) Park S-h	15	15
(Czech Republic) J Fröhlich	2	6
PFQ	(Sri Lanka) N Karunaratne	15	11	6
Q4	(Denmark) J Ø. Jørgensen	9	15	15
(France) S Maunoury	1	3
(Australia) S Brehaut	15	15
9	(Malaysia) S A Ayob	15	15
(New Zealand) J Gordon	9	10
(England) A Ghaffar	15	15
Q2	(Denmark) S Gavnholt	3	6

Second Round
1	(Malaysia) Lee C W	15	15
(Denmark) M Christensen	7	9
10	(South Korea) Park S-h	15	15
Q4	(Denmark) J Ø. Jørgensen	5	5
8	(Denmark) N C Kaldau	15	15
(Australia) S Brehaut	7	11
9	(Malaysia) S A Ayob	15	15
(England) A Ghaffar	9	5

Third Round
1	(Malaysia) Lee C W	15	15
10	(South Korea) Park S-h	13	12
8	(Denmark) N C Kaldau	15	15
9	(Malaysia) S A Ayob	7	9

Quarter-finals
1	(Malaysia) Lee C W	15	15
8	(Denmark) N C Kaldau	3	11

==== Section 2 ====
First Round
(England) N Kidd	4	6
(Indonesia) S Santoso	15	15
11	(Netherlands) D Palyama	17	10	15
(Czech Republic) J Vondra	15	15	5
(Malaysia) Yeoh K B	15	15
Q1	(China) Lü Y	13	8
(France) J-M Lefort	8	15	8
(Russia) S Pukhov	15	8	15
13	(New Zealand) G Bellingham	16	1
(Canada) A Dabeka	17	15
(Denmark) K Ødum	15	10	15
Q7	(Germany) R Spitko	10	15	12

Second Round
4	(South Korea) Lee H-i	15	15
(Indonesia) S Santoso	9	1
11	(Netherlands) D Palyama	7	8
(Malaysia) Yeoh K B	15	15
5	(Malaysia) Wong C H	15	15
(Russia) S Pukhov	6	6
(Canada) A Dabeka	7	2
(Denmark) K Ødum	15	15

Third Round
4	(South Korea) Lee H-i	15	15
(Malaysia) Yeoh K B	1	5
5	(Malaysia) Wong C H	15	15
(Denmark) K Ødum	13	9

Quarter-finals
4	(South Korea) Lee H-i	12	7
5	(Malaysia) Wong C H	15	15

=== Bottom half ===
==== Section 3 ====
First Round
(Malaysia) Y Khrishnan	8	11
Q6	(China) Li Y	15	15
(Austria) J Koch	9	4
12	(Netherlands) E Pang	15	15
(France) O Fossy	8	4
(Ukraine) V Druzchenko	15	15
(Denmark) J Persson	15	15
Q8	(Slovenia) L Petrič	9	4
(Czech Republic) P Koukal	12	15	12
14	(Poland) P Wacha	15	4	15
(England) A Smith	10	4
(China) Xia XZ	15	15

Second Round
Q6	(China) Li Y	15	15
12	(Netherlands) E Pang	11	12
(Ukraine) V Druzchenko	9	15	13
7	(South Korea) Shon S-m	15	11	15
(Denmark) J Persson	15	15
14	(Poland) P Wacha	13	9
(China) Xia XZ	15	15
3	(Malaysia) M H Hashim	11	13

Third Round
Q6	(China) Li Y	0	3
7	(South Korea) Shon S-m	15	15
(Denmark) J Persson	3	5
(China) Xia XZ	15	15

Quarter-finals
7	(South Korea) Shon S-m	3	5
(China) Xia XZ	15	15

==== Section 4 ====
First Round
PFQ	(France) E Kehlhoffner	0	17	15
Q5	(Denmark) K Nielsen	15	16	8
(New Zealand) J Moody	9	17	15
15	(Germany) B Joppien	15	15	6
(South Korea) Jang Y-s	15	15
(Spain) C Longo	1	4
(Malaysia) Lee T S	11	9
Q3	(Malaysia) J Chua	15	15
(England) T Honey	15	6	7
16	(Canada) B Mliroy	12	15	15
(France) A Rasidi	15	15
(Iran) K Mehrabi	1	1

Second Round
PFQ	(France) E Kehlhoffner	15	15
(New Zealand) J Moody	12	8
(South Korea) Jang Y-s	6	9
6	(Malaysia) Kuan B H	15	15
Q3	(Malaysia) J Chua	15	15
16	(Canada) B Mliroy	7	9
(France) A Rasidi	3	1
2	(Denmark) P Gade	15	15

Third Round
PFQ	(France) E Kehlhoffner	11	14
6	(Malaysia) Kuan B H	15	17
Q3	(Malaysia) J Chua	3	1
2	(Denmark) P Gade	15	15

Quarter-finals
6	(Malaysia) Kuan B H	7	0
2	(Denmark) P Gade	15	15

== Women's singles ==
=== Seeds ===
1. (France) Pi Hongyan (semi-finals)
2. (Germany) Huaiwen Xu (champion)
3. (Netherlands) Yao Jie (withdrew)
4. (Netherlands) Mia Audina (semi-finals)
5. (Germany) Juliane Schenk (quarter-finals)
6. (South Korea) Seo Yoon-hee (quarter-finals)
7. (Malaysia) Wong Mew Choo (second round)
8. (England) Tracey Hallam (first round)

=== Finals ===
Semi-finals
1	(France) Pi Hongyan	3	2
(China) Zhu Lin	11	11
3/4	(Netherlands) Mia Audina	13	4	3
2	(Germany) Huaiwen Xu	11	11	11

Final
(China) Zhu Lin	9	4
2	(Germany) Huaiwen Xu	11	11

=== Top half ===
==== Section 1 ====
First Round
1	(France) Pi HY	13	11
(Scotland) S Hughes	10	3
PFQ	(Switzerland) J Cicognini	5	2
(Malaysia) S Mudukasan	11	11
5/8	(Germany) J Schenk	11	11
(Canada) C Reid	6	2
(South Korea) Lee Y-h	11	11
Q4	(Ukraine) L Griga	1	7

Second Round
1	(France) Pi HY	11	11
(Malaysia) S Mudukasan	5	5
5/8	(Germany) J Schenk	13	11
(South Korea) Lee Y-h	12	5

Quarter-finals
1	(France) Pi HY	11	11
5/8	(Germany) J Schenk	8	6

==== Section 2 ====
First Round
PFQ	(Netherlands) R van Cutsen	9	9
(Indonesia) F Ratnasari	11	11
(Germany) N Grether	8	1
(China) Zhu L	11	11
5/8	(South Korea) Seo Y-h	11	11
(New Zealand) R Hindley	3	6
(England) J Mann	3	1
Q3	(Netherlands) J Meulendijks	11	11

Second Round
(Indonesia) F Ratnasari	4	1
(China) Zhu L	11	11
5/8	(South Korea) Seo Y-h	9	11	11
Q3	(Netherlands) J Meulendijks	11	5	3

Quarter-finals
(China) Zhu L	11	11
5/8	(South Korea) Seo Y-h	7	5

=== Bottom half ===
==== Section 3 ====
First Round
(England) J Pittard	1	9
Q2	(South Korea) Lee H-j	11	11
(Indonesia) A Firdasari	11	2	6
5/8	(Malaysia) Wong M C	4	11	11
(South Korea) Jang S-y	7	11	11
(Austria) S Prutsch	11	2	5
(Germany) P Overzier	0	11
3/4	(Netherlands) M Audina	11	13

Second Round
Q2	(South Korea) Lee H-j	2	13	11
5/8	(Malaysia) Wong M C	11	11	8
(South Korea) Jang S-y	6	2
3/4	(Netherlands) M Audina	11	11

Quarter-finals
Q2	(South Korea) Lee H-j	2	5
3/4	(Netherlands) M Audina	11	11

==== Section 4 ====
First Round
(New Zealand) R Bellingham	1	8
Q1	(China) Wang L	11	11
(Scotland) Y Wemyss	11	5	13
5/8	(England) T Hallam	4	11	11
(South Korea) Hwang H-y	11	11
(Finland) A Nieminen	5	4
(Canada) A Rice	4	1
2	(Germany) HW Xu	11	11

Second Round
Q1	(China) Wang L	11	11
(Scotland) Y Wemyss	2	3
(South Korea) Hwang H-y	7	13	7
2	(Germany) HW Xu	11	10	11

Quarter-finals
Q1	(China) Wang L	6	8
2	(Germany) HW Xu	11	11

== Men's doubles ==
=== Seeds ===
1. (Denmark) Mathias Boe / Carsten Mogensen (final)
2. (Malaysia) Chan Chong Ming / Koo Kien Keat (champions)
3. (Malaysia) Mohd Zakry Abdul Latif / Gan Teik Chai (first round)
4. (Poland) Michał Łogosz / Robert Mateusiak (quarter-finals)
5. (Malaysia) Robert Lin Woon Fui / Mohd Fairuzizuan Mohd Tazari (quarter-finals)
6. (Denmark) Jonas Rasmussen / Peter Steffensen (quarter-finals)
7. (Malaysia) Ong Soon Hock / Tan Bin Shen (second round)
8. (Denmark) Thomas Laybourn / Lars Paaske (quarter-finals)

=== Finals ===
Semi-finals
1	(Denmark) Mathias Boe (Denmark) Carsten Mogensen	15	15
(South Korea) Jung Jae-sung (South Korea) Lee Yong-dae	12	16
(China) Sang Yang (China) Zheng Bo
2	(Malaysia) Chan Chong Ming (Malaysia) Koo Kien Keat	w	/	o

Final
1	(Denmark) Mathias Boe (Denmark) Carsten Mogensen	14	15	14
2	(Malaysia) Chan Chong Ming (Malaysia) Koo Kien Keat	17	8	17

=== Top half ===
==== Section 1 ====
First Round
1	(Denmark) M Boe (Denmark) C Mogensen	15	15
(Germany) M Fuchs (Germany) R Spitko	5	7
(England) I Palethorpe (England) K Roebuck	15	4
(Malaysia) Choong T F (Malaysia) Wong C H	17	15
5/8	(Malaysia) R Lin W F (Malaysia) M F Mohd Tazari	15	15
(Australia) R Smith (Australia) G Warfe	4	3
Q4	(South Korea) Jung T-k (South Korea) Lee J-j	11	11
(South Korea) Kang M-w (South Korea) Yoo Y-s	15	15

Second Round
1	(Denmark) M Boe (Denmark) C Mogensen	15	15
(Malaysia) Choong T F (Malaysia) Wong C H	3	3
5/8	(Malaysia) R Lin W F (Malaysia) M F Mohd Tazari	5	15	15
(South Korea) Kang M-w (South Korea) Yoo Y-s	15	12	10

Quarter-finals
1	(Denmark) M Boe (Denmark) C Mogensen	15	15
5/8	(Malaysia) R Lin W F (Malaysia) M F Mohd Tazari	12	5

==== Section 2 ====
First Round
3/4	(Malaysia) M Z Abdul Latif (Malaysia) Gan T C	15	14	12
(China) Guo ZD (China) Xie ZB	13	17	15
(South Korea) Jung J-s (South Korea) Lee Y-d	15	15
(Czech Republic) J Fröhlich (Czech Republic) J Vondra	1	6
5/8	(Denmark) J Rasmussen (Denmark) P Steffensen	15	15
(New Zealand) G Bellingham (New Zealand) C Cooper	9	5
(France) E Kehlhoffner (France) T Quéré	15	15
Q3	(Germany) P Neubacher (Germany) J-S Schulz	8	5

Second Round
(China) Guo ZD (China) Xie ZB	15	6	10
(South Korea) Jung J-s (South Korea) Lee Y-d	13	15	15
5/8	(Denmark) J Rasmussen (Denmark) P Steffensen	15	15
(France) E Kehlhoffner (France) T Quéré	3	6

Quarter-finals
(South Korea) Jung J-s (South Korea) Lee Y-d	15	15
5/8	(Denmark) J Rasmussen (Denmark) P Steffensen	9	13

=== Bottom half ===
==== Section 3 ====
First Round
(China) Sang Y (China) Zheng B	15	15
Q2	(Netherlands) R Bosch (Netherlands) J Wouters	1	3
(New Zealand) J Gordon (New Zealand) D Shirley	13	6
5/8	(Malaysia) Ong S H (Malaysia) Tan B S	15	15
SUB	(England) C Tonks (England) C Langridge	9	16
(Belgium) W Claes (Belgium) F Mawet	15	17
(Germany) K Hopp (Germany) I Kindervater	15	15
3/4	(Poland) M Łogosz (Poland) R Mateusiak	17	17

Second Round
(China) Sang Y (China) Zheng B	15	9	15
5/8	(Malaysia) Ong S H (Malaysia) Tan B S	11	15	6
(Belgium) W Claes (Belgium) F Mawet	5	2
3/4	(Poland) M Łogosz (Poland) R Mateusiak	15	15

Quarter-finals
(China) Sang Y (China) Zheng B	15	15
3/4	(Poland) M Łogosz (Poland) R Mateusiak	6	14

==== Section 4 ====
First Round
(South Korea) Han S-h (South Korea) Hwang J-m	15	15
Q1	(Germany) T Dettmann (Germany) J Schöttler	3	3
(Australia) B Cooper (Australia) T Denny	3	8
5/8	(Denmark) T Laybourn (Denmark) L Paaske	15	15
(England) R Blair (England) A Clark	15	15
(Austria) J Koch (Austria) P Zauner	4	7
(France) M Popov (France) S Stoyanov	5	8
2	(Malaysia) Chan C M (Malaysia) Koo K K	15	15

Second Round
(South Korea) Han S-h (South Korea) Hwang J-m	9	17	12
5/8	(Denmark) T Laybourn (Denmark) L Paaske	15	14	15
(England) R Blair (England) A Clark	15	8	13
2	(Malaysia) Chan C M (Malaysia) Koo K K	13	15	15

Quarter-finals
5/8	(Denmark) T Laybourn (Denmark) L Paaske
2	(Malaysia) Chan C M (Malaysia) Koo K K	w	/	o

== Women's doubles ==
=== Seeds ===
1. (South Korea) Lee Hyo-jung / Lee Kyung-won (semi-finals)
2. (England) Gail Emms / Donna Kellogg (first round)
3. (England) Ella Tripp / Joanne Wright (first round)
4. (Malaysia) Chin Eei Hui / Wong Pei Tty (semi-finals)
5. (Denmark) Britta Andersen / Mette Schjoldager (quarter-finals)
6. (China) Zhang Dan / Zhao Tingting (final)
7. (Germany) Nicole Grether / Juliane Schenk (second round)
8. (Chinese Taipei) Cheng Wen-hsing / Chien Yu-chin (quarter-finals)

=== Finals ===
Semi-finals
1	(South Korea) Lee Hyo-jung (South Korea) Lee Kyung-won	16	9
5/8	(China) Zhang Dan (China) Zhao Tingting	17	15
3/4	(Malaysia) Chin Eei Hui (Malaysia) Wong Pei Tty	7	11
(China) Du Jing (China) Yu Yang	15	15

Final
5/8	(China) Zhang Dan (China) Zhao Tingting	5	15	11
(China) Du Jing (China) Yu Yang	15	10	15

=== Top half ===
==== Section 1 ====
First Round
1	(South Korea) Lee H-j (South Korea) Lee K-w	15	15
(Malaysia) Mooi H Y (Malaysia) Ooi S A	4	1
SUB	(Germany) S Marinello (Germany) K Piotrowski	5	3
(Sweden) E Bergblom (Sweden) J Persson	15	15
5/8	(Denmark) B Andersen (Denmark) M Scholdager	15	15
(England) N Munt (England) S Rayappan	6	12
(New Zealand) N Gordon (New Zealand) S Petersen	15	15
(Czech Republic) K Ludíková (Czech Republic) H Milisová	6	12

Second Round
1	(South Korea) Lee H-j (South Korea) Lee K-w	15	15
(Sweden) E Bergblom (Sweden) J Persson	1	6
5/8	(Denmark) B Andersen (Denmark) M Scholdager	15	15
(New Zealand) N Gordon (New Zealand) S Petersen	3	5

Quarter-finals
1	(South Korea) Lee H-j (South Korea) Lee K-w	15	15
5/8	(Denmark) B Andersen (Denmark) M Scholdager	7	5

==== Section 2 ====
First Round
3/4	(England) E Tripp (England) J Wright	7	16
(Poland) K Augustyn (Poland) N Kostiuczyk	15	17
(Germany) C Hückstädt (Germany) C Mette	9	13
(Australia) K Lucas (Australia) K Wilson-Smith	15	15
5/8	(China) Zhang D (China) Zhao TT	15	15
(Scotland) M Douglas (Scotland) Y Wemyss	1	3
(Denmark) P Harder (Switzerland) C Tuwankotta	15	15
(Switzerland) S Keller (Germany) C Vogelgsang	3	4

Second Round
(Poland) K Augustyn (Poland) N Kostiuczyk	15	15
(Australia) K Lucas (Australia) K Wilson-Smith	9	7
5/8	(China) Zhang D (China) Zhao TT	15	15
(Denmark) P Harder (Switzerland) C Tuwankotta	5	4

Quarter-finals
(Poland) K Augustyn (Poland) N Kostiuczyk	5	1
5/8	(China) Zhang D (China) Zhao TT	15	15

=== Bottom half ===
==== Section 3 ====
First Round
(Switzerland) A Larchenko (Switzerland) H Razi	4	1
(Netherlands) M Audina (Netherlands) L Jonathans	15	15
(Russia) E Dimova (Russia) A Efremova	1	5
5/8	(Germany) N Grether (Germany) J Schenk	15	15
(New Zealand) R Bellingham (New Zealand) R Hindley
(Ukraine) L Griga (Ukraine) E Nozdran	15	15
SUB	(Netherlands) R van Cutsen (Netherlands) P van Dooremalen	2	2
3/4	(Malaysia) Chin E H (Malaysia) Wong P T	15	15

Second Round
(Netherlands) M Audina (Netherlands) L Jonathans	15	15
5/8	(Germany) N Grether (Germany) J Schenk	4	7
(Ukraine) L Griga (Ukraine) E Nozdran	0	6
3/4	(Malaysia) Chin E H (Malaysia) Wong P T	15	15

Quarter-finals
(Netherlands) M Audina (Netherlands) L Jonathans	12	15	12
3/4	(Malaysia) Chin E H (Malaysia) Wong P T	15	5	15

==== Section 4 ====
First Round
PFQ	(England) J Day (England) J Wallwork	15	15
(South Korea) Jang S-y (South Korea) Lee Y-h	11	8
(Canada) H Nichol (Canada) C Reid	5	8
5/8	(Chinese Taipei) Cheng W-h (Chinese Taipei) Chien Y-c	15	15
(Germany) B Overzier (Germany) M Peiffer	6	2
(China) Du J (China) Yu Y	15	15
(South Korea) Ha J-e (South Korea) Hwang Y-m	7	15	15
2	(England) G Emms (England) D Kellogg	15	11	11

Second Round
PFQ	(England) J Day (England) J Wallwork	8	2
5/8	(Chinese Taipei) Cheng W-h (Chinese Taipei) Chien Y-c	15	15
(China) Du J (China) Yu Y	15	15
(South Korea) Ha J-e (South Korea) Hwang Y-m	6	6

Quarter-finals
5/8	(Chinese Taipei) Cheng W-h (Chinese Taipei) Chien Y-c	15	6	8
(China) Du J (China) Yu Y	11	15	15

== Mixed doubles ==
=== Seeds ===
1. (South Korea) Lee Jae-jin / Lee Hyo-jung (quarter-finals)
2. (England) Nathan Robertson / Gail Emms (champions)
3. (Denmark) Thomas Laybourn / Kamilla Rytter Juhl (withdrew)
4. (New Zealand) Daniel Shirley / Sara Petersen (second round)
5. (England) Anthony Clark / Donna Kellogg (semi-finals)
6. (England) Robert Blair / Natalie Munt (final)
7. (Indonesia) Anggun Nugroho / Yunita Tetty (first round)
8. (Malaysia) Koo Kien Keat / Wong Pei Tty (first round)

=== Finals ===
Semi-finals
5/8	(England) A Clark (England) D Kellogg	11	11
5/8	(England) Robert Blair (England) Natalie Munt	15	15
(China) Zheng Bo (China) Zhao Tingting
2	(England) Nathan Robertson (England) Gail Emms	w	/	o

Final
5/8	(England) Robert Blair (England) Natalie Munt	17	7	2
2	(England) Nathan Robertson (England) Gail Emms	14	15	15

=== Top half ===
==== Section 1 ====
First Round
1	(South Korea) Lee J-j (South Korea) Lee H-j	15	15
(Denmark) P Steffensen (Denmark) P Harder	12	7
(Germany) K Hopp (Germany) B Overzier	15	15
(New Zealand) C Cooper (New Zealand) L Shirley	10	2
5/8	(England) A Clark (England) D Kellogg	15	15
(France) J-M Lefort (France) W Rahmawati	4	4
(Australia) T Denney (Australia) Kate Wilson-Smith	8	15	15
Q3	(England) C Langridge (England) J Day	15	3	8

Second Round
1	(South Korea) Lee J-j (South Korea) Lee H-j	15	15
(Germany) K Hopp (Germany) B Overzier	6	7
5/8	(England) A Clark (England) D Kellogg	15	15
(Australia) T Denney (Australia) Kate Wilson-Smith	1	10

Quarter-finals
1	(South Korea) Lee J-j (South Korea) Lee H-j	15	16	15
5/8	(England) A Clark (England) D Kellogg	10	17	17

==== Section 2 ====
First Round
PFQ	(Germany) J-S Schulz (Germany) M Peiffer	3	4
(England) K Roebuck (England) J Wallwork	15	15
(Germany) R Spitko (Germany) C Mette	7	15	8
(Scotland) A Bowman (Scotland) K McEwan	15	12	15
5/8	(England) R Blair (England) N Munt	15	15
(Malaysia) M F Mohd Tazari (Malaysia) Ooi S A	4	7
(South Korea) Yoo Y-s (South Korea) Ha J-e	4	7
Q4	(Ukraine) V Druzchenko (Sweden) J Persson	15	15

Second Round
(England) K Roebuck (England) J Wallwork	11	15	15
(Scotland) A Bowman (Scotland) K McEwan	15	11	9
5/8	(England) R Blair (England) N Munt	15	15
Q4	(Ukraine) V Druzchenko (Sweden) J Persson	6	7

Quarter-finals
(England) K Roebuck (England) J Wallwork	0	12
5/8	(England) R Blair (England) N Munt	15	15

=== Bottom half ===
==== Section 3 ====
First Round
(England) D Lindley (England) S Rayappan	15	6	15
Q2	(South Korea) Jung T-k (South Korea) Lee H-j	2	15	3
(China) Zheng B (China) Zhao TT	15	5	15
5/8	(Indonesia) A Nugroho (Indonesia) Y Tetty	11	15	7
(Germany) M Fuchs (Germany) S Marinello	14	8
(Poland) R Mateusiak (Poland) N Kostiuczyk	17	15
(Denmark) J Rasmussen (Denmark) B Andersen	6	15	15
3/4	(New Zealand) D Shirley (New Zealand) S Petersen	15	12	17

Second Round
(England) D Lindley (England) S Rayappan	8	4
(China) Zheng B (China) Zhao TT	15	15
(Poland) R Mateusiak (Poland) N Kostiuczyk	15	15
3/4	(New Zealand) D Shirley (New Zealand) S Petersen	8	7

Quarter-finals
(China) Zheng B (China) Zhao TT	17	15
(Poland) R Mateusiak (Poland) N Kostiuczyk	14	5

==== Section 4 ====
First Round
(Germany) T Dettmann (Germany) C Hückstädt	5	4
Q1	(England) I Palethorpe (England) J Wright	15	15
(South Korea) Lee Y-d (South Korea) Hwang Y-m	16	15	15
5/8	(Malaysia) Koo K K (Malaysia) Wong P T	17	11	7
PFQ	(United States) N Jinadasa (United States) S Jinadasa	6	7
SUB	(Netherlands) J Wouters (Netherlands) R van Cutsen	15	15
(Australia) B Cooper (Australia) K Lucas	9	10
2	(England) N Robertson (England) G Emms	15	15

Second Round
(England) I Palethorpe (England) J Wright	13	5
(South Korea) Lee Y-d (South Korea) Hwang Y-m	15	15
SUB	(Netherlands) J Wouters (Netherlands) R van Cutsen	4	2
2	(England) N Robertson (England) G Emms	15	15

Quarter-finals
(South Korea) Lee Y-d (South Korea) Hwang Y-m	3	10
2	(England) N Robertson (England) G Emms	15	15

Preceded by 2005 Syed Modi International	IBF World Grand Prix; 2006 BWF season	Succeeded by 2006 German Open
