= 2007 Japan Super Series =

2007 Japan Open Super Series
Tournament details
- Dates: 11 September 2007 – 16 September 2007
- Edition: 28th
- Level: Super Series
- Competitors: 236 from 23 nations
- Total prize money: US$200,000
- Venue: Tokyo Metropolitan Gymnasium
- Location: Tokyo, Japan

Champions
- Men's singles: (Malaysia) Lee Chong Wei
- Women's singles: (Denmark) Tine Rasmussen
- Men's doubles: (Indonesia) Candra Wijaya (United States) Tony Gunawan
- Women's doubles: (China) Yang Wei (China) Zhang Jiewen
- Mixed doubles: (China) Zheng Bo (China) Gao Ling

The 2007 Japan Open Super Series (officially known as the Yonex Open Japan Super Series 2007 for sponsorship reasons) was a badminton tournament which took place at Tokyo Metropolitan Gymnasium in Tokyo, Japan, from 11 to 16 September 2007 and had a total purse of $200,000.

== Tournament ==
The 2007 Japan Open Super Series was the eighth tournament of the 2007 BWF Super Series and also part of the Japan Open championships, which had been held since 1977. This tournament was organized by the Nippon Badminton Association and sanctioned by the BWF.

=== Venue ===
This international tournament was held at Tokyo Metropolitan Gymnasium in Tokyo, Japan.

=== Point distribution ===
Below is the point distribution for each phase of the tournament based on the BWF points system for the BWF Super Series event.

Winner	Runner-up	3/4	5/8	9/16	17/32	33/64	65/128
9,200	7,800	6,420	5,040	3,600	2,220	880	430

=== Prize money ===
The total prize money for this tournament was US$200,000. Distribution of prize money was in accordance with BWF regulations.

Event	Winner	Finalist	Semi-finals	Quarter-finals	Last 16
Men's singles	$20,000	$10,000	$5,000	$2,500	$1,000
Women's singles	$17,250	$8,250	$4,500	$2,250	—
Men's doubles	$18,000	$10,000	$6,000	$3,500	—
Women's doubles	$15,250	$10,000	$5,500	$2,750	—
Mixed doubles	$15,250	$10,000	$5,500	$2,750	—

== Men's singles ==
=== Seeds ===
1. (China) Lin Dan (semi-finals)
2. (China) Bao Chunlai (first round)
3. (China) Chen Hong (first round)
4. (Malaysia) Lee Chong Wei (champion)
5. (China) Chen Jin (quarter-finals)
6. (Denmark) Peter Gade (quarter-finals)
7. (China) Chen Yu (second round)
8. (Denmark) Kenneth Jonassen (second round)

=== Finals ===
Semi-finals
1	(China) Lin Dan	19	15
4	(Malaysia) Lee Chong Wei	21	21
(Indonesia) Taufik Hidayat	21	21
(Indonesia) Simon Santoso	14	16

Final
4	(Malaysia) Lee Chong Wei	22	19	21
(Indonesia) Taufik Hidayat	20	21	19

=== Top half ===
==== Section 1 ====
First Round
1	(China) Lin D	21	21
(Denmark) J Persson	18	15
(Malaysia) R Hashim	21	21
(Singapore) K Lee Y H	17	16
6	(Denmark) P Gade	21	21
(Malaysia) Wong C H	15	15
Q3	(Japan) K Tago	21	6	11
(Hong Kong) Ng W	10	21	21

Second Round
1	(China) Lin D	21	18	21
(Malaysia) R Hashim	11	21	11
6	(Denmark) P Gade	21	21
(Hong Kong) Ng W	9	18

Quarter-finals
1	(China) Lin D	21	21
6	(Denmark) P Gade	16	19

==== Section 2 ====
First Round
4	(Malaysia) Lee C W	22	21
(Malaysia) M H Hashim	20	8
(Indonesia) S D Kuncoro	21	16
(Singapore) R Susilo	23	21
5	(China) Chen J	21	14	21
Q3	(Japan) S Sasaki	6	21	19
Q4	(South Korea) Lee H-i	15	21	21
(England) A Smith	21	15	12

Second Round
4	(Malaysia) Lee C W	19	21	21
(Singapore) R Susilo	21	8	10
5	(China) Chen J	21	21
Q4	(South Korea) Lee H-i	16	14

Quarter-finals
4	(Malaysia) Lee C W	21	21
5	(China) Chen J	7	16

=== Bottom half ===
==== Section 3 ====
First Round
(Netherlands) D Palyama	9	13
(South Korea) Park S-h	21	21
Q1	(South Korea) Lee C-h	12	14
8	(Denmark) K Jonassen	21	21
(Japan) S Satō	6	23
(Malaysia) Yeoh K B	21	25
(Indonesia) T Hidayat	22	18	21
3	(China) Chen H	20	21	13

Second Round
(South Korea) Park S-h	21	21
8	(Denmark) K Jonassen	17	19
(Malaysia) Yeoh K B	11	16
(Indonesia) T Hidayat	21	21

Quarter-finals
(South Korea) Park S-h	17	18
(Indonesia) T Hidayat	21	21

==== Section 4 ====
First Round
(Hong Kong) Chan Y K	21	21
(Wales) R Vaughan	11	9
PFQ	(Canada) A Dabeka	17	19
7	(China) Chen Y	21	21
PFQ	(Netherlands) E Pang	15	19
(Indonesia) S Santoso	21	21
(Thailand) B Ponsana	19	21	22
2	(China) Bao CL	21	12	20

Second Round
(Hong Kong) Chan Y K	21	24
(China) Chen Y	18	22
(Indonesia) S Santoso	21	21
(Thailand) B Ponsana	15	10

Quarter-finals
(Hong Kong) Chan Y K	16	16
(Indonesia) S Santoso	21	21

== Women's singles ==
=== Seeds ===
1. (China) Zhang Ning (quarter-finals)
2. (China) Xie Xingfang (final)
3. (China) Zhu Lin (first round)
4. (Hong Kong) Wang Chen (quarter-finals)
5. (France) Pi Hongyan (quarter-finals)
6. (Germany) Huaiwen Xu (first round)
7. (China) Lu Lan (semi-finals)
8. (Bulgaria) Petya Nedelcheva (withdrew)

=== Finals ===
Semi-finals
(Denmark) Tine Rasmussen	21	21
7	(China) Lu Lan	19	9
Q3	(South Korea) Jun Jae-youn	9	17
2	(China) Xie Xingfang	21	21

Final
(Denmark) Tine Rasmussen	21	21
2	(China) Xie Xingfang	15	17

=== Top half ===
==== Section 1 ====
First Round
1	(China) Zhang N	21	21
(Germany) J Schenk	19	11
Q2	(China) Wang L	12	21	18
(England) T Hallam	21	17	21
6	(Germany) HW Xu	14	15
(Denmark) T Rasmussen	21	21
(China) Jiang YJ	21	21
(Russia) E Karachkova	15	9

Second Round
1	(China) Zhang N	21	23
(England) T Hallam	11	21
(Denmark) T Rasmussen	14	21	21
(China) Jiang YJ	21	13	9

Quarter-finals
1	(China) Zhang N	13	21	18
(Denmark) T Rasmussen	21	16	21

==== Section 2 ====
First Round
4	(Hong Kong) Wang C	21	21
(Chinese Taipei) Cheng S-c	10	14
PFQ	(Indonesia) A Firdasari	19	9
(Hong Kong) Zhou M	21	21
7	(China) Lu L	21	18	21
(Singapore) Li L	8	21	9
(Japan) Y Hirayama	17	21	21
(Scotland) S Hughes	21	15	18

Second Round
4	(Hong Kong) Wang C	19	21	24
(Hong Kong) Zhou M	21	9	22
7	(China) Lu L	21	21
(Japan) Y Hirayama	10	14

Quarter-finals
4	(Hong Kong) Wang C	11	21	17
7	(China) Lu L	21	12	21

=== Bottom half ===
==== Section 3 ====
First Round
(Malaysia) J Wong P X	15	12
Q3	(South Korea) Jun J-y	21	21
(Indonesia) M K Yulianti	21	22
PFQ	(Chinese Taipei) Pai M-j	16	20
(Finland) A Nieminen	12	18
(Singapore) Xing AY	21	21
(Hong Kong) Yip P Y	21	21
3	(China) Zhu L	17	19

Second Round
Q3	(South Korea) Jun J-y	21	18	21
(Indonesia) M K Yulianti	18	21	16
(Singapore) Xing AY	12	15
(Hong Kong) Yip P Y	21	21

Quarter-finals
Q3	(South Korea) Jun J-y	25	21	21
(Hong Kong) Yip P Y	27	6	8

==== Section 4 ====
First Round
Q1	(Japan) M Sekiya	11	15
(Netherlands) Yao J	21	21
(Japan) K Mori	19	16
5	(France) Pi HY	21	21
(Malaysia) Wong M C	21	21
Q4	(South Korea) Kim M-h	11	18
(Netherlands) J Meulendijks	21	14	18
2	(China) Xie XF	15	21	21

Second Round
(Netherlands) Yao J	18	7
5	(France) Pi HY	21	21
(Malaysia) Wong M C	9	15
2	(China) Xie XF	21	21

Quarter-finals
5	(France) Pi HY	15	16
2	(China) Xie XF	21	21

== Men's doubles ==
=== Seeds ===
1. (China) Cai Yun / Fu Haifeng (second round)
2. (Malaysia) Koo Kien Keat / Tan Boon Heong (second round)
3. (Indonesia) Markis Kido / Hendra Setiawan (semi-finals)
4. (Indonesia) Candra Wijaya / (United States) Tony Gunawan (champions)
5. (Denmark) Jens Eriksen / Martin Lundgaard Hansen (second round)
6. (Malaysia) Choong Tan Fook / Lee Wan Wah (second round)
7. (South Korea) Jung Jae-sung / Lee Yong-dae (second round)
8. (South Korea) Hwang Ji-man / Lee Jae-jin (quarter-finals)

=== Finals ===
Semi-finals
(Denmark) Lars Paaske (Denmark) Jonas Rasmussen	21	13	21
4	(Indonesia) Candra Wijaya (United States) Tony Gunawan	19	21	23
3	(Indonesia) Markis Kido (Indonesia) Hendra Setiawan	13	16
(Indonesia) Luluk Hadiyanto (Indonesia) Alvent Yulianto	'21	21

Final
4	(Indonesia) Candra Wijaya (United States) Tony Gunawan	21	21
(Indonesia) Luluk Hadiyanto (Indonesia) Alvent Yulianto	18	17

=== Top half ===
==== Section 1 ====
First Round
1	(China) Cai Y (China) Fu HF	21	21
(China) Guo ZD (China) Xie ZB	14	13
(Denmark) A Kristiansen (Denmark) S Mollyhus	13	13
(Denmark) L Paaske (Denmark) J Rasmussen	21	21
8	(South Korea) Hwang J-m (South Korea) Lee J-j	21	19	21
(Russia) V Durkin (Russia) A Nikolaenko	8	21	18
(England) R Blair (England) A Clark	14	21	16
(Hong Kong) A S Njoto (Hong Kong) Y H Wiratama	21	19	21

Second Round
1	(China) Cai Y (China) Fu HF	20	20
(Denmark) L Paaske (Denmark) J Rasmussen	22	22
8	(South Korea) Hwang J-m (South Korea) Lee J-j	21	19	6
(Hong Kong) A S Njoto (Hong Kong) Y H Wiratama	16	21	21

Quarter-finals
(Denmark) L Paaske (Denmark) J Rasmussen	21	24
8	(Hong Kong) A S Njoto (Hong Kong) Y H Wiratama	17	22

==== Section 2 ====
First Round
4	(Indonesia) C Wijaya (United States) T Gonawan	21	21
(United States) H Bach (United States) K Malaythong	13	7
Q3	(Chinese Taipei) Chien Y-h (Chinese Taipei) Lin Y-l	21	21
(Malaysia) Gan T C (Malaysia) R Lin W F	18	19
5	(Denmark) J Eriksen (Denmark) M Lundgaard Hansen	21	16	21
Q1	(Japan) K Kawaguchi (Japan) N Kawamae	16	21	16
(China) Xu C (China) Zheng B	24	17
(Japan) S Ikeda (Japan) S Sakamoto	26	21

Second Round
4	(Indonesia) C Wijaya (United States) T Gonawan	21	21
Q3	(Chinese Taipei) Chien Y-h (Chinese Taipei) Lin Y-l	13	13
5	(Denmark) J Eriksen (Denmark) M Lundgaard Hansen	21	13	22
(Japan) S Ikeda (Japan) S Sakamoto	17	21	24

Quarter-finals
4	(Indonesia) C Wijaya (United States) T Gonawan	21	21
(Japan) S Ikeda (Japan) S Sakamoto	17	6

=== Bottom half ===
==== Section 3 ====
First Round
Q2	(Singapore) K Lee (Singapore) R Susilo	12	13
(Japan) K Masuda (Japan) T Ōtsuka	21	21
(Malaysia) M Z Abdul Latif (Malaysia) M F Mohd Tazari	13	17
7	(South Korea) Jung J-s (South Korea) Lee Y-d	21	21
(Malaysia) Chan C M (Malaysia) Hoon T H	17	17
(Thailand) P Ngensrisuk (Thailand) S Prapakamol	21	21
(Indonesia) H A Gunawan (Indonesia) J Riyadi	11	21	16
3	(Indonesia) M Kido (Indonesia) H Setiawan	21	15	21

Second Round
(Japan) K Masuda (Japan) T Ōtsuka	14	27	21
7	(South Korea) Jung J-s (South Korea) Lee Y-d	21	25	18
(Thailand) P Ngensrisuk (Thailand) S Prapakamol	21	7	12
3	(Indonesia) M Kido (Indonesia) H Setiawan	18	21	21

Quarter-finals
(Japan) K Masuda (Japan) T Ōtsuka	11	11
3	(Indonesia) M Kido (Indonesia) H Setiawan	21	21

==== Section 4 ====
First Round
(Singapore) H Saputra (Singapore) H Wijaya	17	21	21
(China) He HB (China) Shen Y	21	14	14
Q4	(Chinese Taipei) Fang C-m (Chinese Taipei) Lee S-m	11	21	11
6	(Malaysia) Choon T F (Malaysia) Lee W W	21	14	21
(Chinese Taipei) Hu C-h (Chinese Taipei) Tsai C-h	22	19	16
(Indonesia) L Hadiyanto (Indonesia) A Yulianto	20	21	21
(Malaysia) Ong S H (Malaysia) Tan B S	21	13	14
2	(Malaysia) Koo K K (Malaysia) Tan B H	18	21	21

Second Round
(Singapore) H Saputra (Singapore) H Wijaya	21	21
6	(Malaysia) Choon T F (Malaysia) Lee W W	18	16
(Indonesia) L Hadiyanto (Indonesia) A Yulianto	21	21
2	(Malaysia) Koo K K (Malaysia) Tan B H	19	19

Quarter-finals
(Singapore) H Saputra (Singapore) H Wijaya	22	19
(Indonesia) L Hadiyanto (Indonesia) A Yulianto	24	21

== Women's doubles ==
=== Seeds ===
1. (China) Wei Yili / Zhang Yawen (semi-finals)
2. (China) Gao Ling / Huang Sui (semi-finals)
3. (China) Yang Wei / Zhang Jiewen (champions)
4. (Chinese Taipei) Cheng Wen-hsing / Chien Yu-chin (quarter-finals)
5. (China) Yu Yang / Zhao Tingting (final)
6. (England) Gail Emms / Donna Kellogg (second round)
7. (Japan) Kumiko Ogura / Reiko Shiota (second round)
8. (Malaysia) Chin Eei Hui / Wong Pei Tty (first round)

=== Finals ===
Semi-finals
1	(China) Wei Yili (China) Zhang Yawen	21	11
3	(China) Yang Wei (China) Zhang Jiewen	23	21
5	(China) Yu Yang (China) Zhao Tingting	20	21	22
2	(China) Gao Ling (China) Huang Sui	22	15	20

Final
3	(China) Yang Wei (China) Zhang Jiewen	21	21
5	(China) Yu Yang (China) Zhao Tingting	17	5

=== Top half ===
==== Section 1 ====
First Round
1	(China) Wei YL (China) Zhang YW	21	21
(Singapore) Jiang YM (Singapore) Li YJ	5	11
(Canada) F McKee (Canada) C Reid	6	16
Q2	(Japan) Y Imabeppu (Japan) S Matsuo	21	21
6	(England) G Emms (England) D Kellogg	w	/	o
(Thailand) D Aroonkesorn (Thailand) K Voravichitchaikul
(South Korea) Lee K-w (South Korea) Lee H-j	21	21
Q4	(Chinese Taipei) Liu S-c (Chinese Taipei) Wang P-r	7	8

Second Round
1	(China) Wei YL (China) Zhang YW	21	21
Q2	(Japan) Y Imabeppu (Japan) S Matsuo	10	10
6	(England) G Emms (England) D Kellogg	14	14
(South Korea) Lee K-w (South Korea) Lee H-j	21	21

Quarter-finals
1	(China) Wei YL (China) Zhang YW	21	21
(South Korea) Lee K-w (South Korea) Lee H-j	6	14

==== Section 2 ====
First Round
3	(China) Yang W (China) Zhang JW	21	21
Q3	(Singapore) Li L (Singapore) Xing AY	6	7
(Germany) N Grether (Germany) J Schenk	21	17	21
(France) É Eymard (France) W Rahmawati	15	21	11
7	(Japan) K Ogura (Japan) R Shiota	21	21
(Denmark) L Frier Kristiansen (Denmark) K Rytter Juhl	13	11
(United States) E Lee (United States) M Mangkalakiri	12	9
(South Korea) Ha J-e (South Korea) Kim M-j	21	21

Second Round
3	(China) Yang W (China) Zhang JW	21	21
(Germany) N Grether (Germany) J Schenk	12	14
7	(Japan) K Ogura (Japan) R Shiota	21	19	15
(South Korea) Ha J-e (South Korea) Kim M-j	9	21	21

Quarter-finals
3	(China) Yang W (China) Zhang JW	21	21
(South Korea) Ha J-e (South Korea) Kim M-j	8	11

=== Bottom half ===
==== Section 3 ====
First Round
(Russia) V Sorokina (Russia) N Vislova	21	21
(Malaysia) Fong C Y (Malaysia) Mooi H Y	12	15
Q2
5	(China) Yu Y (China) Zhao TT	w	/	o
(Indonesia) R Mundiasti (Indonesia) E Nursugianti	11	7
(Japan) M Maeda (Japan) S Suetsuna	21	21
(Chinese Taipei) Chou C-c (Chinese Taipei) Ku P-t	21	18	9
4	(Chinese Taipei) Cheng W-h (Chinese Taipei) Chien Y-c	11	21	21

Second Round
(Russia) V Sorokina (Russia) N Vislova	15	11
5	(China) Yu Y (China) Zhao TT	21	21
(Japan) M Maeda (Japan) S Suetsuna	9	12
4	(Chinese Taipei) Cheng W-h (Chinese Taipei) Chien Y-c	21	21

Quarter-finals
5	(China) Yu Y (China) Zhao TT	21	21
4	(Chinese Taipei) Cheng W-h (Chinese Taipei) Chien Y-c	12	14

==== Section 4 ====
First Round
PFQ	(Japan) Y Oku (Japan) M Taruno	w	/	o
(Malaysia) Haw C H (Malaysia) Lim P S
(Japan) A Akao (Japan) T Matsuda	21	15	21
8	(Malaysia) Chin E H (Malaysia) Wong P T	17	21	19
(Sweden) E Bergblom (Sweden) J Persson
(Indonesia) V Marissa (Indonesia) L Natsir	w	/	o
(Russia) E Ananina (Russia) A Russkikh	7	8
2	(China) Gao L (China) Huang S	21	21

Second Round
PFQ	(Japan) Y Oku (Japan) M Taruno	5	11
(Japan) A Akao (Japan) T Matsuda	21	21
(Indonesia) V Marissa (Indonesia) L Natsir	19	21	19
2	(China) Gao L (China) Huang S	21	18	21

Quarter-finals
(Japan) A Akao (Japan) T Matsuda	14	9
2	(China) Gao L (China) Huang S	21	21

== Mixed doubles ==
=== Seeds ===
1. (China) Zheng Bo / Gao Ling (champions)
2. (Indonesia) Nova Widianto / Liliyana Natsir (final)
3. (China) Xie Zhongbo / Zhang Yawen (second round)
4. (England) Nathan Robertson / Gail Emms (second round)
5. (England) Anthony Clark / Donna Kellogg (quarter-finals)
6. (Indonesia) Flandy Limpele / Vita Marissa (quarter-finals)
7. (Thailand) Sudket Prapakamol / Saralee Thungthongkam (quarter-finals)
8. (China) He Hanbin / Yu Yang (second round)

=== Finals ===
Semi-finals
1	(China) Zheng Bo (China) Gao Ling	21	21
(Denmark) Thomas Laybourn (Denmark) Kamilla Rytter Juhl	17	11
(South Korea) Han Sang-hoon (South Korea) Lee Hyo-jung	11	14
2	(Indonesia) Nova Widianto (Indonesia) Liliyana Natsir	21	21

Final
1	(China) Zheng Bo (China) Gao Ling	21	21
2	(Indonesia) Nova Widianto (Indonesia) Liliyana Natsir	19	14

=== Top half ===
==== Section 1 ====
First Round
1	(China) Zheng B (China) Gao L	24	21
(Russia) A Nikolaenko (Russia) N Vislova	22	8
(Germany) T Dettmann (Germany) A Lillie
Q4	(Chinese Taipei) Hu C-h (Chinese Taipei) Cheng W-h
5	(England) A Clark (England) D Kellogg	21	22
(South Korea) Lee Y-d (South Korea) Ha J-e	16	20
PFQ	(Japan) T Ōtsuka (Japan) S Suetsuna	23	9	19
(Denmark) J Rasmussen (Denmark) L Frier Kristiansen	21	21	21

Second Round
1	(China) Zheng B (China) Gao L	21	21
Q4	(Chinese Taipei) Hu C-h (Chinese Taipei) Cheng W-h	10	8
5	(England) A Clark (England) D Kellogg	21	21
(Denmark) J Rasmussen (Denmark) L Frier Kristiansen	11	18

Quarter-finals
1	(China) Zheng B (China) Gao L	21	21
5	(England) A Clark (England) D Kellogg	12	17

==== Section 2 ====
First Round
3	(China) Xie ZB (China) Zhang YW	21	21
(Russia) V Durkin (Russia) V Sorokina	17	18
(Denmark) T Laybourn (Denmark) K Rytter Juhl	21	21
Q3	(Japan) H Saeki (Japan) Y Imabeppu	15	5
8	(China) He HB (China) Yu Y	21	21
(Philippines) Kennevic Asuncion (Philippines) Kennie Asuncion	6	16
(France) S Stoyanov (France) É Eymard	7	16
(Singapore) H Saputra (Singapore) Li YJ	21	21

Second Round
3	(China) Xie ZB (China) Zhang YW	16	21	18
(Denmark) T Laybourn (Denmark) K Rytter Juhl	21	17	21
8	(China) He HB (China) Yu Y	17	16
(Singapore) H Saputra (Singapore) Li YJ	21	21

Quarter-finals
(Denmark) T Laybourn (Denmark) K Rytter Juhl	21	21
(Singapore) H Saputra (Singapore) Li YJ	17	12

=== Bottom half ===
==== Section 3 ====
First Round
(United States) H Bach (United States) E Lee	10	12
(Chinese Taipei) Heish Y-h (Chinese Taipei) Chien Y-c	21	21
PFQ	(Chinese Taipei) Tsai C-h (Chinese Taipei) Cheng S-c	17	14
6	(Indonesia) F Limpele (Indonesia) V Marissa	21	21
(South Korea) Han S-h (South Korea) Lee H-j	21	21
PFQ	(Japan) T Ueda (Japan) M Sekiya	11	13
(Singapore) H Wijaya (Singapore) Jiang YM	19	13
4	(England) N Robertson (England) G Emms	21	21

Second Round
(Chinese Taipei) Heish Y-h (Chinese Taipei) Chien Y-c	21	16	16
6	(Indonesia) F Limpele (Indonesia) V Marissa	12	21	21
(South Korea) Han S-h (South Korea) Lee H-j	21	22
4	(England) N Robertson (England) G Emms	16	20

Quarter-finals
6	(Indonesia) F Limpele (Indonesia) V Marissa	21	17	19
(South Korea) Han S-h (South Korea) Lee H-j	12	21	21

==== Section 4 ====
First Round
(Japan) K Masuda (Japan) M Maeda	22	21
Q2	(Chinese Taipei) Lee S-m (Chinese Taipei) Wang P-r	20	9
Q1	(Japan) Liu ZY (Japan) M Naito	19	8
7	(Thailand) S Prapakamol (Thailand) S Thungthongkam	21	21
(South Korea) Lee J-j (South Korea) Hwang Y-m	21	21
(Malaysia) Tan W K (Malaysia) Woon K W	14	15
(China) Xu C (China) Zhao TT	16	11
2	(Indonesia) N Widianto (Indonesia) L Natsir	21	21

Second Round
(Japan) K Masuda (Japan) M Maeda	22	21	15
7	(Thailand) S Prapakamol (Thailand) S Thungthongkam	20	23	21
(South Korea) Lee J-j (South Korea) Hwang Y-m	14	18
2	(Indonesia) N Widianto (Indonesia) L Natsir	21	21

Quarter-finals
7	(Thailand) S Prapakamol (Thailand) S Thungthongkam	21	14	18
2	(Indonesia) N Widianto (Indonesia) L Natsir	13	21	21
