= 2006 German Open (badminton) =

Tournament details
- Dates: January 10, 2006 – January 15, 2006
- Edition: 49th
- Level: World Grand Prix 3 Stars
- Total prize money: US$80,000
- Venue: RWE Rhein-Ruhr Sporthalle
- Location: Mülheim, Germany

Champions
- Men's singles: (China) Chen Jin
- Women's singles: (China) Zhang Ning
- Men's doubles: (South Korea) Jung Jae-sung (South Korea) Lee Yong-dae
- Women's doubles: (China) Yang Wei (China) Zhang Jiewen
- Mixed doubles: (China) Zhang Jun (China) Gao Ling

The 2006 German Open (officially known as the Yonex German Open 2006 for sponsorship reasons) was a badminton tournament which took place at the RWE Rhein-Ruhr Sporthalle in Mülheim, Germany, on from 10 to 15 January 2006 and had a total purse of $80,000.

== Tournament ==
The 2006 German Open was the second tournament of the 2006 IBF World Grand Prix and also part of the German Open championships, which had been held since 1955.

=== Venue ===
This international tournament was held at RWE Rhein-Ruhr Sporthalle in Mülheim, Germany.

=== Point distribution ===
Below is the point distribution table for each phase of the tournament based on the IBF points system for the IBF World Grand Prix 3-star event.

Winner	Runner-up	3/4	5/8	9/16	17/32	33/64
3,600	3,060	2,520	1,980	1,440	900	360

=== Prize pool ===
The total prize money for this tournament was US$80,000. The distribution of the prize money was in accordance with IBF regulations.

Event	Winner	Finalist	Semi-finals	Quarter-finals	Last 16
Men's singles	$6,400	$3,200	$1,600	$800	$320
Women's singles	$5,520	$2,640	$1,440	$720	—N/a
Men's doubles	$5,760	$3,200	$1,920	$1,120	—N/a
Women's doubles	$4,880	$3,200	$1,760	$880	—N/a
Mixed doubles	$4,880	$3,200	$1,760	$880	—N/a

== Men's singles ==
=== Seeds ===
1. (China) Lin Dan (semi-finals)
2. (China) Bao Chunlai (third round)
3. (South Korea) Lee Hyun-il (quarter-finals)
4. (China) Chen Hong (final)
5. (Hong Kong) Ng Wei (third round)
6. (South Korea) Shon Seung-mo (first round)
7. (Denmark) Niels Christian Kaldau (first round)
8. (Japan) Shōji Satō (second round)
9. (Canada) Bobby Milroy (second round)
10. (South Korea) Park Sung-hwan (third round)
11. (Netherlands) Dicky Palyama (third round)
12. (Germany) Björn Joppien (third round)
13. (China) Chen Jin (champion)
14. (Netherlands) Eric Pang (second round)
15. (Poland) Przemysław Wacha (withdrew)
16. (New Zealand) Geoff Bellingham (first round)

=== Finals ===
Semi-finals
1	(China) Lin Dan	13	15	8
4	(China) Chen Hong	15	10	15
13	(China) Chen Jin	15	15
(Denmark) Kasper Ødum	2	8

Final
4	(China) Chen Hong	3	7
13	(China) Chen Jin	15	15

=== Top half ===
==== Section 1 ====
First Round
1	(China) Lin D	12	15	15
(Japan) S Sasaki	15	2	2
(France) O Fossy	10	13
(Wales) M Lewis	15	15
11	(Netherlands) D Palyama	15	15
(Germany) A Wölk	3	11
PFQ	(Malaysia) J Chua	15	15
Q8	(Germany) R Nichterwitz	10	6
6	(South Korea) Shon S-m	11	14
PFQ	(Germany) R Spitko	15	17
(China) Xia XZ	15	15
(Belgium) D Jaco	6	1
16	(New Zealand) G Bellingham	10	6
(Canada) A Dabeka	15	15
(Hong Kong) Y H Wiratama	15	11	9
Q5	(China) Wu YY	13	15	15

Second Round
1	(China) Lin D	15	15
(Wales) M Lewis	3	1
11	(Netherlands) D Palyama	15	15
PFQ	(Malaysia) J Chua	10	6
PFQ	(Germany) R Spitko	7	8
(China) Xia XZ	15	15
(Canada) A Dabeka	7	6
Q5	(China) Wu YY	15	15

Third Round
1	(China) Lin D	15	15
11	(Netherlands) D Palyama	7	11
(China) Xia XZ	15	15
Q5	(China) Wu YY	7	6

Quartert-finals
1	(China) Lin D	15	15
(China) Xia XZ	8	8

==== Section 2 ====
First Round
4	(China) Chen H	15	15
(Czech Republic) P Koukal	7	11
(France) S Maunoury	16	8
(Ukraine) V Druzchenko	17	15
10	(South Korea) Park S-h	w	/	o
(New Zealand) J Gordon
(Denmark) K Ipsen	15	15
Q6	(Netherlands) K Ridder	10	1
7	(Denmark) N C Kaldau	13	6
(Japan) Y Nakanishi	15	15
(France) E Kehlhoffner	9	7
(Austria) J Koch	15	15
PFQ	(China) Lü Y	15	15
(Malaysia) Pei W C	6	7
(Hong Kong) Chan Y K	3	15	15
Q2	(Germany) D Gunawi	15	8	8

Second Round
4	(China) Chen H	15	15
(Ukraine) V Druzchenko	2	12
10	(South Korea) Park S-h	15	15
(Denmark) K Ipsen	0	7
(Japan) Y Nakanishi	15	15
(Austria) J Koch	5	2
PFQ	(China) Lü Y	15	11	15
(Hong Kong) Chan Y K	10	15	12

Third Round
4	(China) Chen H	15	13	15
10	(South Korea) Park S-h	6	15	7
(Japan) Y Nakanishi	7	4
PFQ	(China) Lü Y	15	15

Quartert-finals
4	(China) Chen H	15	15
(China) Lü Y	12	8

=== Bottom half ===
==== Section 3 ====
First Round
(Czech Republic) J Fröhlich	11	9
Q4	(South Korea) Kang W-k	15	15
(Malaysia) Y Krishnan	5	2
13	(China) Chen J	15	15
(Denmark) P Mikkelsen	1	15	15
(Australia) S Brehaut	15	5	9
(England) R Ouseph	6	5
5	(Hong Kong) Ng W	15	15
(China) Li Y	15	15
Q1	(Germany) I Maywald	12	5
(Germany) Y Yudianto	6	17	7
14	(Netherlands) E Pang	15	14	15
(France) J-M Lefort	15	15
(Lithuania) K Navickas	10	4
(New Zealand) J Moody	6	7
3	(South Korea) Lee H-i	15	15

Second Round
Q4	(South Korea) Kang W-k	1	8
13	(China) Chen J	15	15
(Denmark) P Mikkelsen	13	14
5	(Hong Kong) Ng W	15	17
(China) Li Y	9	15	15
14	(Netherlands) E Pang	15	12	2
(France) J-M Lefort	7	3
3	(South Korea) Lee H-i	15	15

Third Round
13	(China) Chen J	15	15
5	(Hong Kong) Ng W	6	6
(China) Li Y	13	5
3	(South Korea) Lee H-i	15	15

Quartert-finals
13	(China) Chen J	11	15	15
3	(South Korea) Lee H-i	15	3	10

==== Section 4 ====
First Round
(Hong Kong) A Hariyanto	17	15
Q3	(Japan) K Saeki	16	12
(Netherlands) R Kwee	4	0
12	(Germany) B Joppien	15	15
(France) N Lasmari	7	4
(Indonesia) S Santoso	15	15
(England) A Smith	15	8	3
8	(Japan) S Satō	5	15	15
(Denmark) K Ødum	15	15
Q7	(Austria) P Zauner
(Czech Republic) J Vondra	7	3
9	(Canada) B Milroy	15	15
(France) A Rasidi	15	15
(Sri Lanka) N Karunaratne	11	6
(South Korea) Jang Y-s	4	4
2	(China) Bao CL	15	15

Second Round
(Hong Kong) A Hariyanto	15	10	12
12	(Germany) B Joppien	1	15	15
(Indonesia) S Santoso	15	15
8	(Japan) S Satō	8	3
(Denmark) K Ødum	9	15	15
9	(Canada) B Milroy	15	3	10
(France) A Rasidi	7	2
2	(China) Bao CL	15	15

Third Round
12	(Germany) B Joppien	11	15	7
(Indonesia) S Santoso	15	4	15
(Denmark) K Ødum	15	0
2	(China) Bao CL	11	6^{r}

Quartert-finals
(Indonesia) S Santoso	15	12	0^{r}
(Denmark) K Ødum	9	15	0

== Women's singles ==
=== Seeds ===
1. (China) Zhang Ning (champion)
2. (China) Xie Xingfang (quarter-finals)
3. (Hong Kong) Wang Chen (semi-finals)
4. (France) Pi Hongyan (quarter-finals)
5. (Germany) Huaiwen Xu (second round)
6. (Netherlands) Yao Jie (second round)
7. (Netherlands) Mia Audina (second round)
8. (England) Tracey Hallam (second round)

=== Finals ===
Semi-finals
1	(China) Zhang Ning	7	11	11
(China) Zhu Lin	11	8	5
3	(Hong Kong) Wang Chen	13	6	8
Q3	(China) Lu Lan	10	11	11

Final
1	(China) Zhang Ning	11	11
Q3	(China) Lu Lan	8	3

=== Top half ===
==== Section 1 ====
First Round
1	(China) Zhang N	11	11
PFQ	(Indonesia) F Ratnasari	1	1
(Japan) E Hirose	11	8	11
(Germany) J Schenk	3	11	5
6	(Netherlands) Yao J	9	11	11
(Hong Kong) Yip P Y	11	2	5
(South Korea) Hwang H-y	7	6
Q1	(South Korea) Lee Y-h	11	11

Second Round
1	(China) Zhang N	11	11
(Japan) E Hirose	4	3
6	(Netherlands) Yao J	7	11	4^{r}
Q1	(South Korea) Lee Y-h	11	6	5

Quarter-finals
1	(China) Zhang N	11	11
Q1	(South Korea) Lee Y-h	2	4

==== Section 2 ====
First Round
4	(France) Pi HY	11	11
PFQ	(South Korea) Jang S-y	6	3
(Japan) Y Hirayama	11	11
PFQ	(Austria) S Prutsch	6	0
8	(England) T Hallam	11	11
(New Zealand) R Hindley	2	8
(China) Zhu L	11	11
Q2	(England) J Mann	0	3

Second Round
4	(France) Pi HY	11	11
(Japan) Y Hirayama	6	8
(England) T Hallam	2	5
(China) Zhu L	11	11

Quarter-finals
4	(France) Pi HY	5	0
(China) Zhu L	11	11

=== Bottom half ===
==== Section 3 ====
First Round
(China) Jiang YJ	3	8
Q4	(China) Wang L	11	11
PFQ	(Germany) P Overzier	1	2
7	(Netherlands) M Audina	11	11
PFQ	(Germany) N Grether	4	11	4
(Chinese Taipei) Cheng S-c	11	7	11
(New Zealand) R Bellingham	5	3
3	(Hong Kong) Wang C	11	11

Second Round
Q4	(China) Wang L	3	11	11
7	(Netherlands) M Audina	11	5	2
(Chinese Taipei) Cheng S-c	7	8
3	(Hong Kong) Wang C	11	11

Quarter-finals
Q4	(China) Wang L	7	8
3	(Hong Kong) Wang C	11	11

==== Section 4 ====
First Round
(South Korea) Seo Y-h	8	6
Q3	(China) Lu L	11	11
(Canada) C Reid	1	1
5	(Germany) HW Xu	11	11
(Japan) K Mori	11	11
(Russia) E Karachkova	4	9
(Scotland) S Hughes	3	3
2	(China) Xie XF	11	11

Second Round
Q3	(China) Lu L	11	6	11
5	(Germany) HW Xu	5	11	6
(Japan) K Mori	11	3	2
2	(China) Xie XF	9	11	11

Quarter-finals
Q3	(China) Lu L	6	11	11
2	(China) Xie XF	11	6	5

== Men's doubles ==
=== Seeds ===
1. (Denmark) Jens Eriksen / Martin Lundgaard Hansen (withdrew)
2. (China) Cai Yun / Fu Haifeng (quarter-finals)
3. (Poland) Michał Łogosz / Robert Mateusiak (quarter-finals)
4. (New Zealand) John Gordon / Daniel Shirley (first round)
5. (England) Robert Blair / Anthony Clark (final)
6. (South Korea) Jung Jae-sung / Lee Yong-dae (champions)
7. (Japan) Keita Masuda / Tadashi Ōtsuka (semi-finals)
8. (Hong Kong) Liu Kwok Wa / Albertus Susanto Njoto (semi-finals)

=== Finals ===
Semi-finals
5	(England) Robert Blair (England) Anthony Clark	15	15
8	(Hong Kong) Liu Kwok Wa (Hong Kong) Albertus Susanto Njoto	0	5
7	(Japan) Keita Masuda (Japan) Tadashi Ōtsuka	9	15	8
6	(South Korea) Jung Jae-sung (South Korea) Lee Yong-dae	15	11	15

Final
5	(England) Robert Blair (England) Anthony Clark	11	6
6	(South Korea) Jung Jae-sung (South Korea) Lee Yong-dae	15	15

=== Top half ===
==== Section 1 ====
First Round
PFQ	(Netherlands) R Bosch (Netherlands) J Wouters	9	7
(South Korea) Hang S-h (South Korea) Hang J-m	15	15
(Germany) K Hopp (Germany) I Kindervater	15	4	15
SUB	(China) Sang Y (China) Zheng B	13	15	9
5	(England) R Blair (England) A Clark	15	15
(Czech Republic) J Fröhlich (Czech Republic) J Vondra	7	0
(France) E Kehlhoffner (France) T Quéré	15	15
Q4	(Germany) S E Kastens (Germany) M Reuter	12	3

Second Round
(South Korea) Hang S-h (South Korea) Hang J-m	14	15	15
(Germany) K Hopp (Germany) I Kindervater	17	7	8
5	(England) R Blair (England) A Clark	15	15
(France) E Kehlhoffner (France) T Quéré	9	11

Quarter-finals
(South Korea) Hang S-h (South Korea) Hang J-m	9	15
5	(England) R Blair (England) A Clark	15	17

==== Section 2 ====
First Round
4	(New Zealand) J Gordon (New Zealand) D Shirley	11	15	1
PFQ	(South Korea) Kang M-w (South Korea) Yoo Y-s	15	9	15
(England) R Adcock (England) R Middleton	15	15
(Wales) M Hughes (Wales) M Lewis	9	10
8	(Hong Kong) Liu K W (Hong Kong) A S Njoto	15	15
(Japan) S Nakao (Japan) S Sakamoto	13	7
(Australia) B Cooper (Australia) T Denney	15	15
Q1	(Germany) A Vetters (Germany) F Wahab	4	11

Second Round
PFQ	(South Korea) Kang M-w (South Korea) Yoo Y-s	15	11	9
(England) R Adcock (England) R Middleton	4	15	15
8	(Hong Kong) Liu K W (Hong Kong) A S Njoto	15	15
(Australia) B Cooper (Australia) T Denney	7	3

Quarter-finals
(England) R Adcock (England) R Middleton	5	5
8	(Hong Kong) Liu K W (Hong Kong) A S Njoto	15	15

=== Bottom half ===
==== Section 3 ====
First Round
(England) S Archer (England) D Lindley	15	8	15
Q3	(Russia) V Durkin (Russia) A Nikolaenko	2	15	11
(South Korea) Jung T-k (South Korea) Lee J-j	11	4
7	(Japan) K Masuda (Japan) T Ōtsuka	15	15
(Germany) T Dettmann (Germany) J Schöttler	9	14
(New Zealand) G Bellingham (New Zealand) C Cooper	15	17
(Australia) R Smith (Australia) G Warfe	8	3
3	(Poland) M Łogosz (Poland) R Mateusiak	15	15

Second Round
(England) S Archer (England) D Lindley	13	4
7	(Japan) K Masuda (Japan) T Ōtsuka	15	15
(New Zealand) G Bellingham (New Zealand) C Cooper	4	7
3	(Poland) M Łogosz (Poland) R Mateusiak	15	15

Quarter-finals
7	(Japan) K Masuda (Japan) T Ōtsuka	w	/	o
3	(Poland) M Łogosz (Poland) R Mateusiak

==== Section 4 ====
First Round
(Denmark) A Kristiansen (Denmark) S Mollyhus	7	15	15
Q2	(Belarus) A Konakh (Russia) A Russkikh	15	6	7
(Austria) J Koch (Austria) P Zauner	1	8
6	(South Korea) Jung J-s (South Korea) Lee Y-d	15	15
(Germany) M Fuchs (Germany) R Spitko	15	10	15
(Belgium) W Claes (Belgium) F Mawet	13	15	4
(France) M Popov (France) S Stoyanov	4	5
2	(China) Cai Y (China) Fu HF	15	15

Second Round
(Denmark) A Kristiansen (Denmark) S Mollyhus	11	3
6	(South Korea) Jung J-s (South Korea) Lee Y-d	15	15
(Germany) M Fuchs (Germany) R Spitko	2	8
2	(China) Cai Y (China) Fu HF	15	15

Quarter-finals
6	(South Korea) Jung J-s (South Korea) Lee Y-d	15	7	15
2	(China) Cai Y (China) Fu HF	7	15	8

== Women's doubles ==
=== Seeds ===
1. (China) Gao Ling / Huang Sui (final)
2. (South Korea) Lee Hyo-jung / Lee Kyung-won (quarter-finals)
3. (China) Yang Wei / Zhang Jiewen (champions)
4. (Japan) Kumiko Ogura / Reiko Shiota (first round)
5. (China) Zhang Dan / Zhao Tingting (semi-finals)
6. (China) Wei Yili / Zhang Yawen (semi-finals)
7. (Chinese Taipei) Cheng Wen-hsing / Chien Yu-chin (quarter-finals)
8. (Japan) Aki Akao / Tomomi Matsuda (first round)

=== Finals ===
Semi-finals
1	(China) Gao Ling (China) Huang Sui	15	15
5	(China) Zhang Dan (China) Zhao Tingting	1	4
3	(China) Yang Wei (China) Zhang Jiewen	15	15
6	(China) Wei Yili (China) Zhang Yawen	5	12

Final
1	(China) Gao Ling (China) Huang Sui	15	11	10
3	(China) Yang Wei (China) Zhang Jiewen	3	15	15

=== Top half ===
==== Section 1 ====
First Round
1	(China) Gao L (China) Huang S	15	15
(France) É Eymard (France) W Rahmawati	1	2
(Germany) S Marinello (Germany) K Piotrowski	9	7
(Russia) V Sorokina (Russia) N Vislova	15	15
7	(Chinese Taipei) Cheng W-s (Chinese Taipei) Chien Y-c	15	15
(Netherlands) R van Cutsen (Netherlands) P van Dooremalen	4	3
(England) S Bok (England) J Wallwork	15	12	8
Q4	(Germany) S Struschka (Germany) C Vogelgsang	8	15	15

Second Round
1	(China) Gao L (China) Huang S	15	15
(Russia) V Sorokina (Russia) N Vislova	3	2
7	(Chinese Taipei) Cheng W-s (Chinese Taipei) Chien Y-c	15	15
Q4	(Germany) S Struschka (Germany) C Vogelgsang	8	0

Quarter-finals
1	(China) Gao L (China) Huang S	15	15
7	(Chinese Taipei) Cheng W-s (Chinese Taipei) Chien Y-c	8	4

==== Section 2 ====
First Round
4	(Japan) K Ogura (Japan) R Shiota	12	15	12
(South Korea) Ha J-e (South Korea) Hwang Y-m	15	4	15
(Germany) C Hückstädt (Germany) C Mette	17	15
Q2	(Germany) C Bott (Germany) K Schnaase	16	13
5	(China) Zhang D (China) Zhao TT	15	15
(Australia) K Lucas (Australia) K Wilson-Smith	11	1
(New Zealand) N Gordon (New Zealand) S Petersen	15	15
Q3	(Russia) E Karachkova (Russia) M Yakusheva	8	10

Second Round
(South Korea) Ha J-e (South Korea) Hwang Y-m	15	15
(Germany) C Hückstädt (Germany) C Mette	5	4
5	(China) Zhang D (China) Zhao TT	15	17
(New Zealand) N Gordon (New Zealand) S Petersen	1	14

Quarter-finals
(South Korea) Ha J-e (South Korea) Hwang Y-m	3	2
5	(China) Zhang D (China) Zhao TT	15	15

=== Bottom half ===
==== Section 3 ====
First Round
(New Zealand) R Bellingham (New Zealand) R Hindley	5	0
Q1	(Netherlands) M Audina (Netherlands) L Bruil	15	15
(China) Du J (China) Yu Y	15	15
8	(Japan) A Akao (Japan) T Matsuda	4	12
(Germany) B Overzier (Germany) M Peiffer	15	15
(Scotland) I Bankier (Scotland) E Mason	9	1
(Hong Kong) Koon W C (Hong Kong) Li W M	1	3
3	(China) Yang W (China) Zhang JW	15	15

Second Round
Q1	(Netherlands) M Audina (Netherlands) L Bruil	4	10
(China) Du J (China) Yu Y	15	15
(Germany) B Overzier (Germany) M Peiffer	10	0
3	(China) Yang W (China) Zhang JW	15	15

Quarter-finals
(China) Du J (China) Yu Y	11	1
3	(China) Yang W (China) Zhang JW	15	15

==== Section 4 ====
First Round
(England) N Munt (England) S Rayappan	15	15
(Chinese Taipei) Chang L-y (Chinese Taipei) Cheng S-c	12	11
(Malaysia) Chor H Y (Malaysia) Lim P S	7	0
6	(China) Wei YL (China) Zhang YW	15	15
(Germany) N Grether (Germany) J Schenk	15	15
(Poland) K Augustyn (Poland) N Kostiuczyk	5	8
(Canada) H Nichol (Canada) C Reid	5	1
2	(South Korea) Lee H-j (South Korea) Lee K-w	15	15

Second Round
(England) N Munt (England) S Rayappan	6	6
6	(China) Wei YL (China) Zhang YW	15	15
(Germany) N Grether (Germany) J Schenk	2	2
2	(South Korea) Lee H-j (South Korea) Lee K-w	15	15

Quarter-finals
6	(China) Wei YL (China) Zhang YW	15	12	15
2	(South Korea) Lee H-j (South Korea) Lee K-w	10	15	13

== Mixed doubles ==
=== Seeds ===
1. (South Korea) Lee Jae-jin / Lee Hyo-jung (semi-finals)
2. (China) Zhang Jun / Gao Ling (champions)
3. (China) Xie Zhongbo / Zhang Yawen (final)
4. (New Zealand) Daniel Shirley / Sare Petersen (semi-finals)
5. (England) Robert Blair / Anthony Clark (quarter-finals)
6. (Hong Kong) Albertus Susanto Njoto / Li Wing Mui (first round)
7. (Indonesia) Anggun Nugroho / Yunita Tetty (quarter-finals)
8. (Australia) Travis Denney / Kate Wilson-Smith (first round)

=== Finals ===
Semi-finals
1	(South Korea) Lee Jae-jin (South Korea) Lee Hyo-jin	10	9
3	(China) Xie Zhongbo (China) Zhang Yawen	15	15
4	(New Zealand) Daniel Shirley (New Zealand) Sara Petersen	15	7	5
2	(China) Zhang Jun (China) Gao Ling	11	15	15

Final
3	(China) Xie Zhongbo (China) Zhang Yawen	11	12
2	(China) Zhang Jun (China) Gao Ling	15	15

=== Top half ===
==== Section 1 ====
First Round
1	(South Korea) Lee J-j (South Korea) Lee H-j	15	15
(France) J-M Lefort (France) W Rahmawati	3	7
(Germany) K Hopp (Germany) B Overzier	16	17	15
(New Zealand) C Cooper (New Zealand) L Shirley	17	14	10
8	(Australia) T Denney (Australia) K Wilson-Smith	15	8	4
(China) Guo ZD (China) Yu Y	4	15	15
(Germany) J Schöttler (Germany) G Köhler	8	15	12
Q1	(England) R Adcock (England) J Wallwork	15	11	15

Second Round
(South Korea) Lee J-j (South Korea) Lee H-j	15	15
(Germany) K Hopp (Germany) B Overzier	5	2
(China) Guo ZD (China) Yu Y	15	15
(England) R Adcock (England) J Wallwork	5	3

Quarter-finals
(South Korea) Lee J-j (South Korea) Lee H-j	7	15	15
(China) Guo ZD (China) Yu Y	15	9	12

==== Section 2 ====
First Round
3	(China) Xie ZB (China) Zhang YW	15	15
(South Korea) Lee Y-d (South Korea) Hwang Y-m	9	11
(Germany) T Dettmann (Germany) A Lillie	5	10
(Ukraine) V Druzchenko (Ukraine) E Nozdran	15	15
5	(England) R Blair (England) N Munt	15	15
(Netherlands) J Wouters (Netherlands) P van Dooremalen	3	11
(Japan) K Masuda (Japan) T Matsuda	15	7	15
Q2	(France) S Stoyanov (France) É Eymard	12	15	5

Second Round
(China) Xie ZB (China) Zhang YW	15	15
(Ukraine) V Druzchenko (Ukraine) E Nozdran	13	9
5	(England) R Blair (England) N Munt	11	15	15
(Japan) K Masuda (Japan) T Matsuda	15	3	9

Quarter-finals
3	(China) Xie ZB (China) Zhang YW	15	15
5	(England) R Blair (England) N Munt	7	3

=== Bottom half ===
==== Section 3 ====
First Round
(Germany) J-S Schulz (Germany) M Peiffer	3	6
Q3	(England) R Middleton (England) S Bok	15	15
(England) D Lindley (England) S Rayappan	15	16	15
6	(Hong Kong) A S Njoto (Hong Kong) Li W M	8	17	1
(Germany) M Fuchs (Germany) S Marinello	8	7
(Scotland) A Bowman (Scotland) K McEwan	15	15
(South Korea) Yoo Y-s (South Korea) Ha J-e	6	11
4	(New Zealand) D Shirley (New Zealand) S Petersen	15	15

Second Round
Q3	(England) R Middleton (England) S Bok	15	15
(England) D Lindley (England) S Rayappan	6	4
(Scotland) A Bowman (Scotland) K McEwan	5	12
4	(New Zealand) D Shirley (New Zealand) S Petersen	15	15

Quarter-finals
(England) R Middleton (England) S Bok	9	6
4	(New Zealand) D Shirley (New Zealand) S Petersen	15	15

==== Section 4 ====
First Round
(Germany) R Spitko (Germany) C Mette	4	8
Q4	(England) S Archer (England) E Tripp	15	15
(Australia) B Cooper (Australia) K Lucas	3	6
7	(Indonesia) A Nugroho (Indonesia) Y Tetty	15	15
(Germany) I Kindervater (Germany) K Piotrowski	15	6	15
(Poland) R Mateusiak (Poland) N Kostiuczyk	6	15	7
(Japan) S Nakao (Japan) A Akao	8	7
2	(China) Zhang J (China) Gao L	15	15

Second Round
Q4	(England) S Archer (England) E Tripp	4	3
7	(Indonesia) A Nugroho (Indonesia) Y Tetty	15	15
(Germany) I Kindervater (Germany) K Piotrowski	4	6
2	(China) Zhang J (China) Gao L	15	15

Quarter-finals
(Indonesia) A Nugroho (Indonesia) Y Tetty	5	6
2	(China) Zhang J (China) Gao L	15	15

Preceded by 2006 Swiss Open	IBF World Grand Prix; 2006 BWF season	Succeeded by 2006 All England Open
