= South Korea national badminton team =

South Korean national badminton team

South Korea
- Association: Badminton Korea Association
- Confederation: Badminton Asia
- President: Kim Taek-gyu

BWF ranking
- Current ranking: 2 (6 October 2026)
- Highest ranking: 1 (6 July 2017)

Sudirman Cup
- Appearances: 17 (first in 1989)
- Best result: Champions (1991, 1993, 2003, 2017)

Thomas Cup
- Appearances: 22 (first in 1984)
- Best result: Runners-up (2008, 2012)

Uber Cup
- Appearances: 22 (first in 1984)
- Best result: Champions (2010, 2022, 2026)

Asian Mixed Team Championships
- Appearances: 3 (first in 2017)
- Best result: Runners-up (2017, 2023)

Asian Men's Team Championships
- Appearances: 8 (first in 1985)
- Best result: Semi-finals (1985, 1987, 1989, 2016, 2018, 2022, 2024)

Asian Women's Team Championships
- Appearances: 5 (first in 2016)
- Best result: Champions (2026)

The South Korea national badminton team (Korean: 대한민국 배드민턴 국가대표팀; recognized as Korea by BWF) represents South Korea in international badminton team competitions. The team emerged as the Sudirman Cup champion in 1991, 1993, 2003, and 2017, also won world women's team championships in the 2010 and repeated this feat in the 2022 Uber Cups.

== Participation in BWF competitions ==
=== Thomas Cup ===
| Year | Round | Pos |
|---|---|---|
| 1949 | Did not enter | |
| 1952 | Did not enter | |
| 1955 | Did not enter | |
| 1958 | Did not enter | |
| 1961 | Did not enter | |
| 1964 | Did not enter | |
| 1967 | Did not enter | |
| 1970 | Did not enter | |
| 1973 | Did not enter | |
| 1976 | Did not qualify | |
| 1979 | Did not enter | |
| 1982 | Did not qualify | |
| 1984 | Fourth place | 4th |
| 1986 | Group stage | 5th |
| 1988 | Group stage | 6th |
| 1990 | Group stage | 5th |
| 1992 | Semi-finals | 4th |
| 1994 | Semi-finals | 3rd |
| 1996 | Semi-finals | 3rd |
| 1998 | Group stage | 5th / 6th |
| 2000 | Semi-finals | 4th |
| 2002 | Group stage | 5th |
| 2004 | Semi-finals | 4th |
| 2006 | Quarter-finalist | |
| 2008 | (silver) Runner-up | |
| 2010 | Quarter-finalist | |
| 2012 | (silver) Runner-up | |
| 2014 | Quarter-finalist | |
| 2016 | Semi-finals | 4th |
| 2018 | Quarter-finalist | 7th |
| 2020 | Quarter-finalist | 7th |
| 2022 | Quarter-finalist | 8th |
| 2024 | Quarter-finalist | 7th |
| 2026 | Group stage | 10th |

Uber Cup

| Year | Result |
|---|---|
| 1984 | (bronze) Third place |
| 1986 | (bronze) Third place |
| 1988 | (silver) Runner-up |
| 1990 | (silver) Runner-up |
| 1992 | (silver) Runner-up |
| 1994 | (bronze) Semi-finalist |
| 1996 | (bronze) Semi-finalist |
| 1998 | (bronze) Semi-finalist |
| 2000 | (bronze) Semi-finalist |
| 2002 | (silver) Runner-up |
| 2004 | (silver) Runner-up |
| 2006 | Quarter-finalist |
| 2008 | (bronze) Semi-finalist |
| 2010 | (gold) Winner |
| 2012 | (silver) Runner-up |
| 2014 | (bronze) Semi-finalist |
| 2016 | (silver) Runner-up |
| 2018 | (bronze) Semi-finalist − 3rd |
| 2020 | (bronze) Semi-finalist − 3rd |
| 2022 | (gold) Winner |
| 2024 | (bronze) Semi-finalist − 3rd |
| 2026 | (gold) Winner |

Sudirman Cup

| Year | Result |
|---|---|
| 1989 | (silver) Runner-up |
| 1991 | (gold) Winner |
| 1993 | (gold) Winner |
| 1995 | (bronze) Semi-finalist |
| 1997 | (silver) Runner-up |
| 1999 | (bronze) Semi-finalist |
| 2001 | (bronze) Semi-finalist |
| 2003 | (gold) Winner |
| 2005 | (bronze) Semi-finalist |
| 2007 | (bronze) Semi-finalist |
| 2009 | (silver) Runner-up |
| 2011 | (bronze) Semi-finalist |
| 2013 | (silver) Runner-up |
| 2015 | (bronze) Semi-finalist |
| 2017 | (gold) Winner |
| 2019 | Quarter-finalist |
| 2021 | (bronze) Semi-finalist |
| 2023 | (silver) Runner-up |
| 2025 | (silver) Runner-up |

== Participation in Badminton Asia Championships ==
Men's team

| Year | Result |
|---|---|
| 2016 | (bronze) Semi-finalist |
| 2018 | (bronze) Semi-finalist |
| 2020 | Quarter-finalist |
| 2022 | (bronze) Semi-finalist |
| 2024 | (bronze) Semi-finalist |
| 2026 | (bronze) Semi-finalist |

Women's team

| Year | Result |
|---|---|
| 2016 | (bronze) Semi-finalist |
| 2018 | (bronze) Semi-finalist |
| 2020 | (silver) Runner-up |
| 2022 | (silver) Runner-up |
| 2024 | did not enter |
| 2026 | (gold) Winner |

Mixed team

| Year | Result |
|---|---|
| 2017 | (silver) Runner-up |
| 2019 | did not enter |
| 2023 | (silver) Runner-up |
| 2025 | Quarter-finalist |

== Junior competitive record ==
=== World Junior Team Championships ===
==== Suhandinata Cup ====
| Year | Result |
|---|---|
| (China) 2000 | (silver) Runner-up |
| (South Africa) 2002 | (silver) Runner-up |
| (Canada) 2004 | (silver) Runner-up |
| (South Korea) 2006 | (gold) Winner |
| (New Zealand) 2007 | (silver) Runner-up |
| (India) 2008 | (silver) Runner-up |
| (Malaysia) 2009 | Did not enter |
| (Mexico) 2010 | (silver) Runner-up |
| (Taiwan) 2011 | (silver) Runner-up |
| (Japan) 2012 | (bronze) Third place |
| (Thailand) 2013 | (gold) Winner |
| (Malaysia) 2014 | Quarter-finalist |
| (Peru) 2015 | 10th place |
| (Spain) 2016 | 9th place |
| (Indonesia) 2017 | (bronze) Semi-finalist |
| (Canada) 2018 | (silver) Runner-up |
| (Russia) 2019 | Quarter-finalist |
| (New Zealand) 2020 | Cancelled |
| (China) 2021 | Cancelled |
| (Spain) 2022 | (gold) Winner |
| (United States) 2023 | 9th place |
| (China) 2024 | 13th place |
| (India) 2025 | Quarter-finalist - 8th of 36 |
| (Egypt) 2026 | Group stage - 17th of 47 |

=== Asian Junior Team Championships ===
==== Men's team ====
| Year | Result |
|---|---|
| 1997 | (bronze) Semi-finalist |
| 1998 | |
| 1999 | (bronze) Semi-finalist |
| 2000 | (bronze) Semi-finalist |
| 2001 | (bronze) Semi-finalist |
| 2002 | (silver) Runner-up |
| 2004 | (silver) Runner-up |
| 2005 | (gold) Winner |

==== Women's team ====
| Year | Result |
|---|---|
| 1997 | (bronze) Semi-finalist |
| 1998 | (silver) Runner-up |
| 1999 | (bronze) Semi-finalist |
| 2000 | (silver) Runner-up |
| 2001 | (gold) Winner |
| 2002 | (silver) Runner-up |
| 2004 | (silver) Runner-up |
| 2005 | (bronze) Semi-finalist |

==== Mixed team ====
| Year | Result |
|---|---|
| 2006 | (gold) Winner |
| 2007 | Quarter-finals |
| 2008 | (silver) Runner-up |
| 2009 | Quarter-finals |
| 2010 | Quarter-finals |
| 2011 | Did not enter |
| 2012 | (bronze) Semi-finalist |
| 2013 | (silver) Runner-up |
| 2014 | (silver) Runner-up |
| 2015 | (silver) Runner-up |
| 2016 | (silver) Runner-up |
| 2017 | (gold) Winner |
| 2018 | Quarter-finals |
| 2019 | (bronze) Semi-finalist |
| 2023 | Quarter-finals |
| 2024 | (silver) Runner-up |
| 2025 | (bronze) Semi-finalist |
| 2026 | Group stage |

== Famous players ==
Men

- Heo Kwang-hee
- Jeon Hyeok-jin
- Lee Dong-keun
- Lee Hyun-il
- Park Sung-hwan
- Shon Seung-mo
- Son Wan-ho
- Choi Sol-gyu
- Ha Tae-kwon
- Han Sang-hoon
- Hwang Ji-man
- Jung Jae-sung
- Kang Kyung-jin
- Kang Min-hyuk
- Kim Dong-moon
- Kim Ki-jung
- Kim Moon-soo
- Kim Sa-rang
- Kim Won-ho
- Ko Sung-hyun
- Lee Dong-soo
- Lee Jae-jin
- Lee Yong-dae
- Park Joo-bong
- Seo Seung-jae
- Shin Baek-cheol
- Yoo Yeon-seong
- Yoo Yong-sung

Women

- An Se-young
- Bae Youn-joo
- Bang Soo-hyun
- Hwang Hye-youn
- Jun Jae-youn
- Kim Ga-eun
- Kim Ji-hyun
- Seo Yoon-hee
- Sung Ji-hyun
- Baek Ha-na
- Chae Yu-jung
- Chang Ye-na
- Chung So-young
- Eom Hye-won
- Gil Young-ah
- Ha Jung-eun
- Hwang Yu-mi
- Jang Hye-ock
- Jeong Na-eun
- Jung Kyung-eun
- Kim Ha-na
- Kim Min-jung
- Kim So-yeong
- Kong Hee-yong
- Lee Hyo-jung
- Lee Kyung-won
- Lee So-hee
- Ra Kyung-min
- Shim Eun-jung
- Shin Seung-chan
