= 2002 IBF World Junior Championships =

Tournament details
- Dates: 25 October 2002– 3 November 2002
- Edition: 6th
- Venue: Pretoria Showgrounds
- Location: Pretoria, South Africa

The 2002 IBF World Junior Championships was an international badminton tournament held in Pretoria, South Africa. China team won the overall titles after clinched the mixed team, boys' and girls' singles, and also the girls' and mixed doubles titles. The boys' doubles title goes to Korean pair.

== Team competition ==
A total of 23 countries competed at the team competition.

=== Medalists ===
Event	Gold	Silver	Bronze
Teams	China; Chen Jin; Lu Yi; Guo Zhendong; Xu Chen; Sun Junjie; Cao Chen; Jiang Yanjiao; Zhu Lin; Du Jing; Yu Yang; Rong Lu	South Korea; Park Sung-hwan; Hwang Ji-man; Kim Dae-sung; Han Sang-hoon; Seo Yoon-hee; Lee Yun-hwa; Yim Ah-young; Yoon Yeo-sook	Indonesia; Simon Santoso; Roy Purnomo; Hendra Setiawan; Joko Riyadi; Rian Sukmawan; Markis Kido; Dewi Tira Arisandi; Adrianti Firdasari; Purwati; Meiliana Jauhari; Devi Sukma Wijaya; Liliyana Natsir

=== Final team ranking ===
1. China
2. South Korea
3. Indonesia
4. Thailand
5. Chinese Taipei
6. Germany
7. Malaysia (Debut)
8. England
9. India
10. Denmark
11. Sweden
12. Canada
13. Netherlands
14. Russia
15. Bulgaria (Debut)
16. South Africa
17. Hong Kong
18. Nigeria (Debut)
19. Czech Republic
20. Zambia (Debut)
21. Finland (Debut)
22. Australia
23. Kenya (Debut)

== Individual competition ==
=== Medalists ===
Event	Gold	Silver	Bronze
Boys singles	(China) Chen Jin	(Singapore) Kendrick Lee Yen Hui	(Singapore) Hendra Wijaya
Boys singles	(China) Chen Jin	(Singapore) Kendrick Lee Yen Hui	(South Korea) Park Sung-hwan
Girls singles	(China) Jiang Yanjiao	(South Korea) Seo Yoon-hee	(China) Yuan Ting
Girls singles	(China) Jiang Yanjiao	(South Korea) Seo Yoon-hee	(Indonesia) Dewi Tira Arisandi
Boys doubles	(South Korea) Han Sang-hoon and Park Sung-hwan	(Malaysia) Jack Koh and Tan Bin Shen	(Malaysia) Koo Kien Keat and Ong Soon Hock
Boys doubles	(South Korea) Han Sang-hoon and Park Sung-hwan	(Malaysia) Jack Koh and Tan Bin Shen	(China) Cao Chen and Sun Junjie
Girls doubles	(China) Du Jing and Rong Lu	(China) Yu Yang and Chen Lanting	(Indonesia) Liliyana Natsir and Devi Sukma Wijaya
Girls doubles	(China) Du Jing and Rong Lu	(China) Yu Yang and Chen Lanting	(Thailand) Duanganong Aroonkesorn and Kunchala Voravichitchaikul
Mixed doubles	(China) Guo Zhendong and Yu Yang	(China) Cao Chen and Rong Lu	(South Korea) Kim Dae-sung and Yim Ah-young
Mixed doubles	(China) Guo Zhendong and Yu Yang	(China) Cao Chen and Rong Lu	(Indonesia) Markis Kido and Liliyana Natsir

== Results ==
=== Semifinals ===
Category	Winner	Runner-up	Score
Boys' singles	(China) Chen Jin	(Singapore) Hendra Wijaya	15–3, 12–15, 15–6
Boys' singles	(Singapore) Kendrick Lee Yen Hui	(South Korea) Park Sung-hwan	15–5, 15–4
Girls' singles	(China) Jiang Yanjiao	(China) Yuan Ting	11–2, 11–6
Girls' singles	(South Korea) Seo Yoon-hee	(Indonesia) Dewi Tira Arisandi	11–6, 11–2
Boys' doubles	(South Korea) Han Sang-hoon & Park Sung-hwan	(Malaysia) Ong Soon Hock & Koo Kien Keat	7–15, 15–8, 15–4
Boys' doubles	(Malaysia) Jack Koh & Tan Bin Shen	(China) Cao Chen & Sun Junjie	15–9, 15–11
Girls' doubles	(China) Du Jing & Rong Lu	(Indonesia) Liliyana Natsir & Devi Sukma Wijaya	11–4, 11–5
Girls' doubles	(China) Chen Lanting & Yu Yang	(Thailand) Duanganong Aroonkesorn & Kunchala Voravichitchaikul	11–2, 11–2
Mixed doubles	(China) Guo Zhendong & Yu Yang	(South Korea) Kim Dae-sung & Yim Ah-young	11–5, 11–4
Mixed doubles	(China) Cao Chen & Rong Lu	(Indonesia) Markis Kido & Liliyana Natsir	11–4, 11–1

=== Finals ===
Category	Winners	Runners-up	Score
Boys' singles	(China) Chen Jin	(Singapore) Kendrick Lee Yen Hui	15–10, 15–5
Girls' singles	(China) Jiang Yanjiao	(South Korea) Seo Yoon-hee	11–0, 8–11, 11–3
Boys' doubles	(South Korea) Han Sang-hoon & Park Sung-hwan	(Malaysia) Jack Koh & Tan Bin Shen	14–17, 15–9, 15–9
Girls' doubles	(China) Du Jing & Rong Lu	(China) Chen Lanting & Yu Yang	11–6, 11–7
Mixed doubles	(China) Guo Zhendong & Yu Yang	(China) Cao Chen & Rong Lu	11–2, 11–1

== Medal account ==
Pos	Country	Gold	Silver	Bronze	Total
1	China	5	2	2	9
2	South Korea	1	2	2	5
3	Singapore	0	1	1	2
3	Malaysia	0	1	1	2
5	Indonesia	0	0	4	4
6	Thailand	0	0	1	1
