= Kim Dae-sung (badminton) =

South Korean badminton player (born 1984)

Personal information
- Born: 5 April 1984 (age 42) Miryang, South Korea
- Height: 1.74 m (5 ft 9 in)
- Weight: 71 kg (157 lb)

Sport
- Country: South Korea
- Sport: Badminton
- Handedness: Right
- Event: Men's & mixed doubles

Men's & mixed doubles
- BWF profile
Medal record
Men's badminton
Representing South Korea
World Junior Championships
Silver medal – second place	2002 Pretoria	Mixed team
Bronze medal – third place	2002 Pretoria	Mixed doubles
Asian Junior Championships
Silver medal – second place	2002 Kuala Lumpur	Boys' doubles
Silver medal – second place	2002 Kuala Lumpur	Boys' team

Kim Dae-sung (Korean: 김대성; born 5 April 1984) is a South Korean badminton player. Kim who was educated at the Miryang high school, won the silver medals at the 2002 Asian Junior Championships in the boys' doubles and team events. He also part of the national junior team that won the silver medal at the World Junior Championships, and clinched the bronze medal in the mixed doubles event. The Inha University alumni joined the Suwon city team in 2009, and became the captain of that team. Kim won the men's doubles title at the 2009 National Championships partnered with Yoo Yeon-seong. In the international level, he was the men's doubles champion at the 2015 Mongolia International tournament.

== Achievements ==
=== World Junior Championships ===
Mixed doubles
Year	Venue	Partner	Opponent	Score	Result
2002	Pretoria Showgrounds; Pretoria, South Africa	(South Korea) Yim Ah-young	(China) Guo Zhendong (China) Yu Yang	5–11, 4–11	Bronze

=== Asian Junior Championships ===
Boys' doubles
Year	Venue	Partner	Opponent	Score	Result
2002	Kuala Lumpur Badminton Stadium; Kuala Lumpur, Malaysia	(South Korea) Han Sang-hoon	(Malaysia) Koo Kien Keat (Malaysia) Ong Soon Hock	13–15, 13–15	Silver

=== BWF International Challenge/Series ===
Men's doubles
Year	Tournament	Partner	Opponent	Score	Result
2015	Mongolia International	(South Korea) Kim Young-sun	(South Korea) Jin Yong-hoon (South Korea) Lee Cheol-ho	21–15, 21–11	(gold) Winner
2005	Thailand Satellite	(South Korea) Jeon Jun-bum	(South Korea) Han Sang-hoon (South Korea) Hwang Ji-man	6–15, 12–15	(silver) Runner-up

Mixed doubles
Year	Tournament	Partner	Opponent	Score	Result
2015	Mongolia International	(South Korea) Kang Chan-hee	(South Korea) Kim Young-sun (South Korea) Lee Ja-yeong	17–21, 16–21	(silver) Runner-up
2013	Maldives International	(South Korea) Oh Bo-kyung	(India) K. Nandagopal (India) K. Maneesha	16–21, 21–23	(silver) Runner-up

BWF International Challenge tournament
BWF International Series tournament
