= Kasper Ipsen =

Danish badminton player (born 1984)

Personal information
- Born: 7 July 1984 (age 42)

Sport
- Country: Denmark
- Sport: Badminton

Men's singles
- Highest ranking: 69 (26 August 2010)
- BWF profile

Kasper Ipsen (born 7 July 1984) is a Danish badminton player from the Holte badmintonklub. In 2005, he received a badminton awards from Poul-Erik Høyer Larsen, a former president of the Badminton World Federation and Danish Olympic gold medallist. In 2008, he won the men's singles title at the Cyprus International tournament.

== Achievements ==
=== BWF International Challenge/Series ===
Men's singles
Year	Tournament	Opponent	Score	Result
2009	Estonian International	(Finland) Ville Lång	14–21, 19–21	(silver) Runner-up
2008	Cyprus International	(Denmark) Emil Vind	21–10, 21–12	(gold) Winner
2006	Hungarian International	(Sweden) George Rimarcdi	18–21, 21–10, 17–21	(silver) Runner-up
2006	Slovak International	(Czech Republic) Jan Fröhlich	12–21, 21–19, 18–21	(silver) Runner-up

BWF International Challenge tournament
BWF International Series tournament
