= Suzanne Keller =

American sociologist

- Born: Suzanne Infeld; April 16, 1927; Vienna, Austria
- Died: December 9, 2010 (aged 83)
- Spouse: Charles Haar

Academic background
- Education: BA, 1948, Hunter College; MA, 1950, PhD, 1953, Columbia University
- Thesis: The social origins and career lines of three generations of American business leaders (1953)

Academic work
- Institutions: Princeton University

Suzanne Infeld Keller (April 16, 1927 – December 9, 2010) was an American sociologist. She was the first female faculty member to be granted tenure at Princeton University.

== Early life and education ==
Keller was born as Suzanne Infeld on April 16, 1927, in Vienna, Austria. Her family moved to New York City when she was a child and she graduated from Hunter College with a Bachelor of Arts degree in 1948. While earning her graduate degrees, Keller worked with the United States Air Force as an interpreter and researcher in Munich.

She went on to earn her Master's degree and PhD from Columbia University before working as a professor at Brandeis University, New York Medical College, Vassar College, and New York University.

== Career ==
During her time as a visiting professor, Keller published her first book, Beyond the Ruling Class, with Random House publishing. She re-examined the idea of a small class of elitism and argued that minority elites were responsible for major changes to the social order. Robert Wuthnow spoke highly of her book saying, "she [Keller] was one of the few people who attempted to look at the history of elites and what function they played in society." As a result of her research, Keller earned a professorship position at Princeton University in 1966. There was limited female faculty with the university at the time and she described her experience as "I really thought I was from Mars. It was as if the men had never seen a woman." In her first few years at Princeton she published her second book The Urban Neighborhood, which aimed to close the gap that Keller felt existed between sociologists concept of neighborhoods and physical planners definition. After two years at Princeton, Keller became the first female faculty or research member at Princeton to be appointed a Full professor. At the time of her promotion, Princeton had not yet allowed women to enroll in their school. She received her letter of promotion on May 5, 1968, although the letterhead started with "Dear Sir." When news broke of her promotion, she was inundated by journalists including one who called her at 4'oclock in the morning.

In her role as a full professor, Keller championed women's studies as an academic subject and taught the university's first course on gender and society. Her advocacy was reflected in her literature such as Building for Women and The American Dream of Family. She also continued to research neighborhoods and communities which culminated into her 2003 book titled Community: Pursuing the Dream, Living the Reality. Using the technique of participant observation, she gathered data on how residents living in Twin Rivers, New Jersey "first planned unit development" learned to live together. Keller retired from Princeton in 2004 and gained the title of professor emeritus.

Keller died on December 9, 2010, after suffering a stroke in Miami. She was survived by her husband Charles Haar and their children.
