= 2002 Asian Junior Badminton Championships =

Tournament details
- Dates: 14–21 July 2002
- Venue: Kuala Lumpur Badminton Stadium
- Location: Kuala Lumpur, Malaysia

The 2002 Asian Junior Badminton Championships were held in Kuala Lumpur Badminton Stadium, Kuala Lumpur, Malaysia from 14 to 21 July.

== Medalists ==
Event	Gold	Silver	Bronze
Boys' teams	Indonesia; Holvy de Pauw; Billy Gunawan; Markis Kido; Adrian Kusnanto; Roy Purnomo; Joko Riyadi; Simon Santoso; Hendra Setiawan; Rian Sukmawan	South Korea; Han Sang-hoon; Hong Seung-ki; Hwang Ji-man; Jung Hoon-min; Jung Ra-sub; Kim Dae-sung; Park Sung-hwan; Shin Hee-kwang	Malaysia; Azrihanif Azahar; Hafiz Hasbullah; Mohd Hazwan Jamaluddin; Hooi Teng Yung; Jack Koh; Koo Kien Keat; Ong Soon Hock; Tan Bin Shen; Tan Zhao Rong; Wong Guan Ming
Boys' teams	Indonesia; Holvy de Pauw; Billy Gunawan; Markis Kido; Adrian Kusnanto; Roy Purnomo; Joko Riyadi; Simon Santoso; Hendra Setiawan; Rian Sukmawan	South Korea; Han Sang-hoon; Hong Seung-ki; Hwang Ji-man; Jung Hoon-min; Jung Ra-sub; Kim Dae-sung; Park Sung-hwan; Shin Hee-kwang	China; Cao Chen; Chen Jin; Gong Weijie; Lin Sen; Sun Junjie; Tao Jiaming; Xie Xin
Girls' teams	China; Chen Lanting; Du Jing; Feng Chen; Jiang Yanjiao; Rong Lu; Pan Pan; Yao Guojun; Yu Yang; Yuan Ting; Zhu Jingjing; Zhu Lin	South Korea; Ahn Yu-jin; Hwang Hye-youn; Jang Soo-young; Kang Joo-young; Lee Yun-hwa; Seo Yoon-hee; Yim Ah-young	Japan; Yu Hirayama; Eriko Hirose; Yasuyo Imabeppu; Niina Iwata; Yuko Koike; Yu Wakita
Girls' teams	China; Chen Lanting; Du Jing; Feng Chen; Jiang Yanjiao; Rong Lu; Pan Pan; Yao Guojun; Yu Yang; Yuan Ting; Zhu Jingjing; Zhu Lin	South Korea; Ahn Yu-jin; Hwang Hye-youn; Jang Soo-young; Kang Joo-young; Lee Yun-hwa; Seo Yoon-hee; Yim Ah-young	India; Aparna Balan; Krishna Dekaraja; Aditi Mutatkar; Dhanya Nair
Boys' singles	(South Korea) Park Sung-hwan	(Singapore) Hendra Wijaya	(Indonesia) Simon Santoso
Boys' singles	(South Korea) Park Sung-hwan	(Singapore) Hendra Wijaya	(South Korea) Hwang Ji-man
Girls' singles	(China) Zhu Lin	(China) Jiang Yanjiao	(Japan) Eriko Hirose
Girls' singles	(China) Zhu Lin	(China) Jiang Yanjiao	(China) Zhu Jingjing
Boys' doubles	(Malaysia) Koo Kien Keat (Malaysia) Ong Soon Hock	(South Korea) Han Sang-hoon (South Korea) Kim Dae-sung	(Indonesia) Markis Kido (Indonesia) Rian Sukmawan
Boys' doubles	(Malaysia) Koo Kien Keat (Malaysia) Ong Soon Hock	(South Korea) Han Sang-hoon (South Korea) Kim Dae-sung	(Indonesia) Hendra Setiawan (Indonesia) Joko Riyadi
Girls' doubles	(China) Du Jing (China) Rong Lu	(Thailand) Soratja Chansrisukot (Thailand) Salakjit Ponsana	(Thailand) Duanganong Aroonkesorn (Thailand) Kunchala Voravichitchaikul
Girls' doubles	(China) Du Jing (China) Rong Lu	(Thailand) Soratja Chansrisukot (Thailand) Salakjit Ponsana	(South Korea) Lee Yun-hwa (South Korea) Yim Ah-young
Mixed doubles	(Indonesia) Markis Kido (Indonesia) Liliyana Natsir	(China) Cao Chen (China) Rong Lu	(Malaysia) Koo Kien Keat (Malaysia) Wong Wai See
Mixed doubles	(Indonesia) Markis Kido (Indonesia) Liliyana Natsir	(China) Cao Chen (China) Rong Lu	(Indonesia) Hendra Setiawan (Indonesia) Devi Sukma Wijaya

== Medal table ==
Rank	Nation	Gold	Silver	Bronze	Total
1	China (CHN)	3	2	2	7
2	Indonesia (INA)	2	0	4	6
3	South Korea (KOR)	1	3	2	6
4	Malaysia (MAS)	1	0	2	3
5	Thailand (THA)	0	1	1	2
6	Singapore (SIN)	0	1	0	1
7	Japan (JPN)	0	0	2	2
8	India (IND)	0	0	1	1
Totals (8 entries)		7	7	14	28
