= Tan Bin Shen =

Malaysian badminton coach and former player

Tan Bin Shen 陳斌生
Personal information
- Born: 24 January 1984 (age 42) Selangor, Malaysia
- Height: 1.74 m (5 ft 9 in)

Sport
- Country: Malaysia
- Sport: Badminton
- Handedness: Right

Men's doubles
- Highest ranking: 8
- BWF profile
Medal record
Men's badminton
Representing Malaysia
Asian Championships
Bronze medal – third place	2005 Hyderabad	Men's doubles
World Junior Championships
Silver medal – second place	2002 Pretoria	Boys' doubles
Asian Junior Championships
Bronze medal – third place	2002 Kuala Lumpur	Boys' team

Tan Bin Shen (Chinese: 陳斌生; Pe̍h-ōe-jī: Tân Pin-seng; born 24 January 1984) is a Malaysian badminton coach and former player. He has served as the men's doubles coach of the Hong Kong national badminton team since February 2025. He served in the same role in Malaysia from 17 December 2020 to 13 January 2025.

== Personal life ==
In his early years, Tan favoured chess and music. Tan began to play badminton at the age of 7. At the age of 12, Tan's potential was spotted by a Selangor coach, Moo Chien Keat. The coach asked Tan's father if he could take him as a student. After receiving the nod from his father, the coach began to train Tan. Four years later, due to his great achievements, Tan was then drafted into the national squad. Tan is married with Melissa Lee, a law graduate from Northumbria University in United Kingdom. In Year 2012 & 2016, both of them welcome a baby boy and a baby girl. Maxwell Tan Guan Liang, Maxine Tan Guan En.

== Career ==
Tan Bin Shen played at the 2007 BWF World Championships in men's doubles with Ong Soon Hock. They were seeded world #16. He was the winner at the 2009 Australia Open Grand Prix and previously training with Gan Teik Chai under the coaching of Razif Sidek from Malaysia.

== Achievements ==
=== Asian Championships ===
Men's doubles
Year	Venue	Partner	Opponent	Score	Result
2005	Gachibowli Indoor Stadium, Hyderabad, India	(Malaysia) Ong Soon Hock	(Indonesia) Markis Kido (Indonesia) Hendra Setiawan	13–15, 13–15	Bronze

=== World Junior Championships ===
Boys' doubles
Year	Venue	Partner	Opponent	Score	Result
2002	Pretoria Showgrounds, Pretoria, South Africa	(Malaysia) Jack Koh	(South Korea) Han Sang-hoon (South Korea) Park Sung-hwan	17–14, 9–15, 9–15	Silver

=== BWF Grand Prix ===
The BWF Grand Prix had two levels, the BWF Grand Prix and Grand Prix Gold. It was a series of badminton tournaments sanctioned by the Badminton World Federation (BWF) which was held from 2007 to 2017.

Men's doubles
Year	Tournament	Partner	Opponent	Score	Result
2009	Malaysia Grand Prix Gold	(Malaysia) Gan Teik Chai	(Malaysia) Koo Kien Keat (Malaysia) Tan Boon Heong	11–21, 13–21	(silver) Runner-up
2009	Australian Open	(Malaysia) Gan Teik Chai	(India) Rupesh Kumar K. T. (India) Sanave Thomas	21–13, 21–11	(gold) Winner
2010	India Grand Prix	(Malaysia) Gan Teik Chai	(Indonesia) Mohammad Ahsan (Indonesia) Bona Septano	21–19, 15–21, 14–21	(silver) Runner-up

BWF Grand Prix Gold tournament
BWF Grand Prix tournament

=== BWF International Challenge/Series ===
Men's doubles
Year	Tournament	Partner	Opponent	Score	Result
2002	India Satellite	(Malaysia) Ng Kean Kok	(Malaysia) Gan Teik Chai (Malaysia) Jeremy Gan	13–15, 5–15	(silver) Runner-up
2006	Malaysia Satellite	(Malaysia) Ong Soon Hock	(Malaysia) Mohd Zakry Abdul Latif (Malaysia) Gan Teik Chai	24–26, 21–18, 21–15	(gold) Winner
2012	Bulgarian International	(Scotland) Robert Blair	(Germany) Andreas Heinz (Germany) Max Schwenger	21–10, 21–17	(gold) Winner
2012	Turkey International	(Scotland) Robert Blair	(Sweden) Magnus Sahlberg (Sweden) Mattias Wigardt	21–11, 21–15	(gold) Winner
2013	Slovak Open	(Switzerland) Oliver Schaller	(Russia) Nikita Khakimov (Russia) Vasily Kuznetsov	9–21, 22–20, 18–21	(silver) Runner-up

BWF International Challenge tournament
BWF International Series tournament
BWF Future Series tournament
