= Lee Yun-hwa =

South Korean badminton player

Personal information
- Born: 14 November 1985 (age 40) Wonju, Gangwon, South Korea
- Height: 1.62 m (5 ft 4 in)

Sport
- Country: South Korea
- Sport: Badminton
- Handedness: Right
- Event: Women's singles & doubles

Women's singles & doubles
- BWF profile
Medal record
Women's badminton
Representing South Korea
Sudirman Cup
Bronze medal – third place	2007 Glasgow	Mixed team
Bronze medal – third place	2005 Beijing	Mixed team
Uber Cup
Gold medal – first place	2010 Kuala Lumpur	Women's team
Silver medal – second place	2004 Jakarta	Women's team
Bronze medal – third place	2008 Jakarta	Women's team
Asian Games
Bronze medal – third place	2006 Doha	Women's team
World Junior Championships
Silver medal – second place	2002 Pretoria	Mixed team
Asian Junior Championships
Gold medal – first place	2001 Taipei	Girls' team
Silver medal – second place	2002 Kuala Lumpur	Girls' team
Bronze medal – third place	2002 Kuala Lumpur	Girls' doubles

Lee Yun-hwa (Korean: 이연화; born 14 November 1985) is a South Korean badminton player. Born in Wonju, Gangwon province, Lee started playing badminton at aged nine. She educated at the Bukwon girls' middle school, after that in Yubong girls' high school. Lee joined the national team when she was 15 and trained at the Taeneung national training center. In the junior event, she competed at the Asian Junior Championships, winning a gold medal in the girls' team event in 2001, girls team silver and girls' doubles bronze medal in 2002. She also part of the national junior team that won the silver medal at the 2002 World Junior Championships. She made a debut at the Uber Cup in 2004, and captured the attention by her outstanding performance winning the singles and doubles event in the semi-finals against Denmark. In the Sudirman Cup, she helped the team reaching in to the semi-finals round in 2005 and 2007, clinched the bronze medal for the team. Lee who was affiliated with the Daekyo Noonoppi, helped the Korean team won the world women's team championships at the 2010 Uber Cup.

== Achievements ==
=== Asian Junior Championships ===
Girls' doubles
Year	Venue	Partner	Opponent	Score	Result
2002	Kuala Lumpur Badminton Stadium; Kuala Lumpur, Malaysia	(South Korea) Yim Ah-young	(Thailand) Soratja Chansrisukot (Thailand) Salakjit Ponsana		Bronze

=== BWF Grand Prix ===
The BWF Grand Prix has two level such as Grand Prix and Grand Prix Gold. It is a series of badminton tournaments, sanctioned by Badminton World Federation (BWF) since 2007.

Women's singles
Year	Tournament	Opponent	Score	Result
2007	U.S. Open	(South Korea) Jun Jae-youn	18–21, 16–21	(silver) Runner-up

BWF Grand Prix Gold tournament
BWF Grand Prix tournament

=== BWF International Challenge/Series ===
Women's singles
Year	Tournament	Opponent	Score	Result
2009	Korea International	(South Korea) Bae Yeon-ju	15–21, 18–21	(silver) Runner-up
2007	Korea International	(South Korea) Jang Soo-young	23–21, 21–15	(gold) Winner
2007	Canadian International	(South Korea) Jun Jae-youn	23–21, 16–21, 21–14	(gold) Winner
2005	Canadian International	(South Korea) Kim Young-mi	11–5, 11–7	(gold) Winner

BWF International Challenge tournament
BWF International Series tournament
