= Ong Soon Hock =

Malaysian badminton player (born 1985)

Ong Soon Hock 王順福
Personal information
- Born: 15 February 1985 (age 41) Selangor, Malaysia
- Height: 1.69 m (5 ft 7 in)

Sport
- Country: Malaysia
- Sport: Badminton
- Handedness: Right

Men's doubles
- Highest ranking: 18
- BWF profile
Medal record
Men's badminton
Representing Malaysia
Thomas Cup
Bronze medal – third place	2010 Kuala Lumpur	Men's team
Asian Championships
Bronze medal – third place	2005 Hyderabad	Men's doubles
Southeast Asian Games
Silver medal – second place	2011 Jakarta–Palembang	Men's team
World Junior Championships
Bronze medal – third place	2002 Pretoria	Boys' doubles
Asian Junior Championships
Gold medal – first place	2002 Kuala Lumpur	Boys' doubles
Bronze medal – third place	2002 Kuala Lumpur	Boys' team

Ong Soon Hock
- Traditional Chinese: 王淳福
- Simplified Chinese: 王淳福
Transcriptions

Ong Soon Hock (born 15 February 1985) is a badminton player from Malaysia.

== Career ==
As a junior player, Ong won the 2002 Asian Junior Championships gold medal in the boys' doubles event and bronze medal in the team event. At the World Junior Championships, he won the boys' doubles bronze. He also won the bronze medal at the 2005 Asian Championships. Together with Gan Teik Chai, Ong won some international tournament in Mauritius, Argentinal and Brazil.

Ong played at the 2007 BWF World Championships in men's doubles with Tan Bin Shen. They were seeded No. 16 and were defeated in the first round by Keita Masuda and Tadashi Ohtsuka, of Japan, 14–21, 8–21.

Ong's partner changed to Hoon Thien How. They participated in the 2008 Indonesia Open and reached the semi-finals before being beaten by Tony Gunawan and Candra Wijaya, 25–23, 15–21, 15–21. This was followed by a defeat to second-seeded Cai Yun and Fu Haifeng in the 2008 China Masters 15–21, 21–17, and 20–22.

In 2009, Ong and Hoon reached Vietnam Open final, but they lost to Indonesia's Luluk Hadiyanto and Joko Riyadi which were seeded 7 in straight sets, 19–21 and 20–22.

== Achievements ==
=== Asian Championships ===
Men's doubles
Year	Venue	Partner	Opponent	Score	Result
2005	Gachibowli Indoor Stadium, Hyderabad, India	(Malaysia) Tan Bin Shen	(Indonesia) Markis Kido (Indonesia) Hendra Setiawan	13–15, 13–15	Bronze

=== World Junior Championships ===
Boys' doubles
Year	Venue	Partner	Opponent	Score	Result
2002	Pretoria Showgrounds, Pretoria, South Africa	(Malaysia) Koo Kien Keat	(South Korea) Han Sang-hoon (South Korea) Park Sung-hwan	15–7, 8–15, 4–15	Bronze

=== Asian Junior Championships ===
Boys' doubles
Year	Venue	Partner	Opponent	Score	Result
2005	Kuala Lumpur Badminton Stadium, Kuala Lumpur, Malaysia	(Malaysia) Koo Kien Keat	(South Korea) Han Sang-hoon (South Korea) Kim Dae-sung	15–13, 15–13	Gold

=== BWF Grand Prix ===
The BWF Grand Prix had two levels, the BWF Grand Prix and Grand Prix Gold. It was a series of badminton tournaments sanctioned by the Badminton World Federation (BWF) which was held from 2007 to 2017.

Men's doubles
Year	Tournament	Partner	Opponent	Score	Result
2009	Vietnam Open	(Malaysia) Hoon Thien How	(Indonesia) Luluk Hadiyanto (Indonesia) Joko Riyadi	19–21, 20–22	(silver) Runner-up
2010	Vietnam Open	(Malaysia) Fairuzizuan Tazari	(Indonesia) Mohammad Ahsan (Indonesia) Bona Septano	18–21, 21–13, 17–21	(silver) Runner-up
2012	Dutch Open	(Malaysia) Gan Teik Chai	(Indonesia) Markis Kido (Indonesia) Alvent Yulianto	21–18, 13–21, 14–21	(silver) Runner-up

BWF Grand Prix Gold tournament
BWF Grand Prix tournament

=== BWF International Challenge/Series ===
Men's doubles
Year	Tournament	Partner	Opponent	Score	Result
2002	Smiling Fish Satellite	(Malaysia) Koo Kien Keat	(Indonesia) Hendry Kurniawan Saputra (Indonesia) Denny Setiawan	2–7, 5–7, 5–7	(silver) Runner-up
2006	Malaysia Satellite	(Malaysia) Tan Bin Shen	(Malaysia) Mohd Zakry Abdul Latif (Malaysia) Gan Teik Chai	24–26, 21–18, 21–15	(gold) Winner
2012	Mauritius International	(Malaysia) Gan Teik Chai	(Mauritius) Denneshsing Baboolall (Mauritius) Yoni Louison	21–9, 21–10	(gold) Winner
2012	Argentina International	(Malaysia) Gan Teik Chai	(Chile) Cristián Araya (Chile) Esteban Mujica	21–14, 21–15	(gold) Winner
2012	Brazil International	(Malaysia) Gan Teik Chai	(United States) Phillip Chew (United States) Sattawat Pongnairat	21–14, 21–14	(gold) Winner

BWF International Challenge tournament
BWF International Series tournament
BWF Future Series tournament
