= Lü Yi (badminton) =

Chinese badminton player (born 1985)

Lü Yi 吕轶
Personal information
- Born: 30 April 1985 (age 41) Beijing, China
- Height: 1.83 m (6 ft 0 in)
- Weight: 78 kg (172 lb)

Sport
- Country: China
- Sport: Badminton
- Handedness: Right

Men's singles
- Highest ranking: 48 (22 October 2009)
- BWF profile
Medal record
Men's badminton
Representing China
World Junior Championships
Gold medal – first place	2002 Pretoria	Mixed team

Lü Yi (Chinese: 吕轶; born 30 April 1985) is a badminton player from the People's Republic of China. He entered the national second team in 2002, and was promoted to the first team in 2006. He was part of the national junior team that won the gold medal at the 2002 World Junior Championships. In the individual events, he was the champions at the 2007 Austrian International, Bitburger Open, and Russian Open.

Lü graduated with a Bachelor of Science degree at the Beijing Capital Normal University in 2007, and now works as a teacher in University of International Business and Economics.

== Achievements ==
=== BWF Grand Prix ===
The BWF Grand Prix has two levels, the BWF Grand Prix and Grand Prix Gold. It is a series of badminton tournaments sanctioned by the Badminton World Federation (BWF) since 2007.

Men's singles
Year	Tournament	Opponent	Score	Result
2007	Russian Open	(Indonesia) Andre Kurniawan Tedjono	21–19, 11–21, 21–10	(gold) Winner
2007	Bitburger Open	(Malaysia) Lee Tsuen Seng	23–21, 19–21, 21–15	(gold) Winner

BWF Grand Prix Gold tournament
BWF Grand Prix tournament

=== BWF International Challenge/Series ===
Men's singles
Year	Tournament	Opponent	Score	Result
2007	Austrian International	(China) Qiu Yanbo	16–21, 21–15, 21–18	(gold) Winner

BWF International Challenge tournament
BWF International Series tournament
