= Han Sang-hoon =

South Korean badminton player (born 1984)

Personal information
- Born: 27 October 1984 (age 42) Seoul, South Korea
- Height: 1.75 m (5 ft 9 in)
- Weight: 79 kg (174 lb)

Sport
- Country: South Korea
- Sport: Badminton
- Handedness: Right
- Event: Men's & mixed doubles

Men's & mixed doubles
- BWF profile
Medal record
Men's badminton
Representing South Korea
Sudirman Cup
Silver medal – second place	2009 Guangzhou	Mixed team
Bronze medal – third place	2007 Glasgow	Mixed team
Asian Championships
Bronze medal – third place	2010 New Delhi	Men's doubles
Bronze medal – third place	2009 Suwon	Men's doubles
World Junior Championships
Gold medal – first place	2002 Pretoria	Boys' doubles
Silver medal – second place	2002 Pretoria	Mixed team
Asian Junior Championships
Silver medal – second place	2002 Kuala Lumpur	Boys' doubles
Silver medal – second place	2002 Kuala Lumpur	Boys' team

- Han Sang-hoon
- Hangul: 한상훈
- Hanja: 韓相訓
- RR: Han Sanghun
- MR: Han Sanghun

Han Sang-hoon (Korean: 한상훈; born 27 October 1984) is a badminton player from South Korea. He was the champion at the 2002 World Junior Championships in the boys' doubles event. Han who was part of the Samsung Electro-Mechanic team, competed at the 2008 Summer Olympics in the mixed doubles event partnered with Hwang Yu-mi.

== Achievements ==
=== Asia Championships ===
Men's doubles
Year	Venue	Partner	Opponent	Score	Result
2010	Siri Fort Indoor Stadium; New Delhi, India	(South Korea) Hwang Ji-man	(Chinese Taipei) Chen Hung-ling (Chinese Taipei) Lin Yu-lang	18–21, 21–12, 18–21	Bronze
2009	Suwon Indoor Stadium; Suwon, South Korea	(South Korea) Hwang Ji-man	(South Korea) Ko Sung-hyun (South Korea) Yoo Yeon-seong	21–19, 15–21, 16–21	Bronze

=== World Junior Championships ===
Boys' doubles
Year	Venue	Partner	Opponent	Score	Result
2002	Pretoria Showgrounds; Pretoria, South Africa	(South Korea) Park Sung-hwan	(Malaysia) Jack Koh (Malaysia) Tan Bin Shen	14–17, 15–9, 15–9	Gold

=== Asian Junior Championships ===
Boys' doubles
Year	Venue	Partner	Opponent	Score	Result
2002	Kuala Lumpur Badminton Stadium; Kuala Lumpur, Malaysia	(South Korea) Kim Dae-sung	(Malaysia) Koo Kien Keat (Malaysia) Ong Soon Hock	13–15, 13–15	Silver

=== BWF Superseries ===
The BWF Superseries, launched on 14 December 2006 and implemented in 2007, is a series of elite badminton tournaments, sanctioned by Badminton World Federation (BWF). BWF Superseries has two level such as Superseries and Superseries Premier. A season of Superseries features twelve tournaments around the world, which introduced since 2011, with successful players invited to the Superseries Finals held at the year end.

Men's doubles
Year	Tournament	Partner	Opponent	Score	Result
2009	All England Open	(South Korea) Hwang Ji-man	(China) Cai Yun (China) Fu Haifeng	17–21, 15–21	(silver) Runner-up

BWF Super Series Finals tournament
BWF Super Series Premier tournament
BWF Super Series tournament

=== BWF Grand Prix ===
The BWF Grand Prix has two levels: Grand Prix and Grand Prix Gold. It is a series of badminton tournaments, sanctioned by Badminton World Federation (BWF) since 2007. The World Badminton Grand Prix sanctioned by International Badminton Federation since 1983.

Mixed doubles
Year	Tournament	Partner	Opponent	Score	Result
2007	Philippines Open	(South Korea) Hwang Yu-mi	(Indonesia) Nova Widianto (Indonesia) Liliyana Natsir	17–21, 13–21	(silver) Runner-up
2007	Thailand Open	(South Korea) Hwang Yu-mi	(China) He Hanbin (China) Yu Yang	12–21, 14–21	(silver) Runner-up

BWF Grand Prix Gold tournament
BWF Grand Prix tournament

=== BWF International Challenge/Series ===
Men's doubles
Year	Tournament	Partner	Opponent	Score	Result
2007	Osaka International	(South Korea) Cho Gun-woo	(Japan) Shuichi Sakamoto (Japan) Shintaro Ikeda	21–18, 16–21, 21–11	(gold) Winner
2005	Mongolia Satellite	(South Korea) Lee Yong-dae	(China) Wang Wei (China) Zhang Lei	15–3, 15–12	(gold) Winner
2005	Vietnam Satellite	(South Korea) Hwang Ji-man	(Malaysia) Mohd Zakry Abdul Latif (Malaysia) Gan Teik Chai	15–4, 14–17, 4–15	(silver) Runner-up
2005	Thailand Satellite	(South Korea) Hwang Ji-man	(South Korea) Jeon Jun-bum (South Korea) Kim Dae-sung	15–6, 15–12	(gold) Winner

Mixed doubles
Year	Tournament	Partner	Opponent	Score	Result
2005	Thailand Satellite	(South Korea) Kim Min-jung	(Thailand) Songphon Anugritayawon (Thailand) Kunchala Voravichitchaikul	12–15, 8–15	(silver) Runner-up

BWF International Challenge tournament
BWF International Series tournament
