= Hwang Ji-man =

South Korean badminton player (born 1984)

Personal information
- Born: 황지만; 8 July 1984 (age 42) Miryang, South Korea
- Height: 1.76 m (5 ft 9 in)
- Weight: 71 kg (157 lb)

Sport
- Country: South Korea
- Sport: Badminton
- Handedness: Right

Men's & mixed doubles
- Highest ranking: 11 (MD) (25 September 2008)
- BWF profile
Medal record
Men's badminton
Representing South Korea
Olympic Games
| Bronze medal – third place | 2008 Beijing | Men's doubles |
Sudirman Cup
| Silver medal – second place | 2009 Guangzhou | Mixed team |
| Bronze medal – third place | 2007 Glasgow | Mixed team |
Thomas Cup
| Silver medal – second place | 2008 Jakarta | Men's team |
Asian Games
| Silver medal – second place | 2006 Doha | Men's team |
Asian Championships
| Bronze medal – third place | 2010 New Delhi | Men's doubles |
| Bronze medal – third place | 2009 Suwon | Men's doubles |
| Bronze medal – third place | 2008 Johor Bahru | Men's doubles |
| Bronze medal – third place | 2006 Johor Bahru | Men's doubles |
World Junior Championships
| Silver medal – second place | 2002 Pretoria | Mixed team |
| Silver medal – second place | 2000 Guangzhou | Mixed team |
Asian Junior Championships
| Gold medal – first place | 2001 Taipei | Boys' doubles |
| Silver medal – second place | 2002 Kuala Lumpur | Boys' team |
| Silver medal – second place | 2001 Taipei | Mixed doubles |
| Bronze medal – third place | 2002 Kuala Lumpur | Boys' singles |
| Bronze medal – third place | 2001 Taipei | Boys' team |

- Hwang Ji-man
- Hangul: 황지만
- Hanja: 黃智萬
- RR: Hwang Jiman
- MR: Hwang Chiman

Hwang Ji-man (Korean: 황지만; Korean pronunciation: [hwaŋ.dʑi.man]; born 8 July 1984) is a badminton player from South Korea.

== Career ==
Hwang started playing badminton when he was in Miryang elementary school, and when he was 17, Hwang was chosen to represent the National Junior team. Hwang played at the 2007 BWF World Championships in men's doubles with Lee Jae-jin. They were seeded 10 and were defeated in the third round by Candra Wijaya and Tony Gunawan, 21–17, 21–16.

In Beijing 2008 Summer Olympics, Hwang and his partner Lee won their first bronze medal after upsetting Choong Tan Fook/Lee Wan Wah in the first round, Tadashi Ohtsuka/Keita Masuda in the quarter-final, but defeated by Cai Yun and Fu Haifeng of China in the semifinal. Nevertheless, in the bronze medal match, Hwang and Lee subdued Danish Lars Paaske and Jonas Rasmussen.

== Achievements ==
=== Olympic Games ===
Men's doubles
| Year | Venue | Partner | Opponent | Score | Result |
|---|---|---|---|---|---|
| 2008 | Beijing University of Technology Gymnasium; Beijing, China | (South Korea) Lee Jae-jin | (Denmark) Lars Paaske (Denmark) Jonas Rasmussen | 13–21, 21–18, 21–17 | Bronze |

=== Asia Championships ===
Men's doubles
| Year | Venue | Partner | Opponent | Score | Result |
|---|---|---|---|---|---|
| 2010 | Siri Fort Indoor Stadium; New Delhi, India | (South Korea) Han Sang-hoon | (Chinese Taipei) Chen Hung-ling (Chinese Taipei) Lin Yu-lang | 18–21, 21–12, 18–21 | Bronze |
| 2009 | Suwon Indoor Stadium; Suwon, South Korea | (South Korea) Han Sang-hoon | (South Korea) Ko Sung-hyun (South Korea) Yoo Yeon-seong | 21–19, 15–21, 16–21 | Bronze |
| 2008 | Bandaraya Stadium; Johor Bahru, Malaysia | (South Korea) Lee Jae-jin | (Indonesia) Candra Wijaya (Indonesia) Nova Widianto | 15–21, 21–19, 17–21 | Bronze |
| 2006 | Bandaraya Stadium; Johor Bahru, Malaysia | (South Korea) Jung Tae-keuk | (Malaysia) Hoon Thien How (Malaysia) Tan Boon Heong | 19–21, 18–21 | Bronze |

=== Asian Junior Championships ===
Boys' singles
| Year | Venue | Opponent | Score | Result |
|---|---|---|---|---|
| 2002 | Kuala Lumpur Badminton Stadium; Kuala Lumpur, Malaysia | (Singapore) Hendra Wijaya | 15–6, 10–15, 11–15 | Bronze |

Boys' doubles
| Year | Venue | Partner | Opponent | Score | Result |
|---|---|---|---|---|---|
| 2001 | Taipei Gymnasium; Taipei, Taiwan | (South Korea) Lee Jae-jin | (Thailand) Adisak Wiriyapadungpong (Thailand) Songphon Anugritayawon | 17–15, 15–1 | Gold |

Mixed doubles
| Year | Venue | Partner | Opponent | Score | Result |
|---|---|---|---|---|---|
| 2001 | Taipei Gymnasium; Taipei, Taiwan | (South Korea) Bae Seung-hee | (South Korea) Lee Jae-jin (South Korea) Hwang Yu-mi | 7–15, 12–15 | Silver |

=== BWF Superseries ===
The BWF Superseries, launched on 14 December 2006 and implemented in 2007, is a series of elite badminton tournaments, sanctioned by Badminton World Federation (BWF). BWF Superseries has two level such as Superseries and Superseries Premier. A season of Superseries features twelve tournaments around the world, which introduced since 2011, with successful players invited to the Superseries Finals held at the year end.

Men's doubles
| Year | Tournament | Partner | Opponent | Score | Result |
|---|---|---|---|---|---|
| 2009 | All England Open | (South Korea) Han Sang-hoon | (China) Cai Yun (China) Fu Haifeng | 17–21, 15–21 | (silver) Runner-up |
| 2008 | All England Open | (South Korea) Lee Jae-jin | (South Korea) Jung Jae-sung (South Korea) Lee Yong-dae | 22–20, 19–21, 18–21 | (silver) Runner-up |
| 2007 | Korea Open | (South Korea) Lee Jae-jin | (South Korea) Jung Jae-sung (South Korea) Lee Yong-dae | 16–21, 15–21 | (silver) Runner-up |

BWF Super Series Finals tournament
BWF Super Series Premier tournament
BWF Super Series tournament

=== BWF Grand Prix ===
The BWF Grand Prix has two level such as Grand Prix and Grand Prix Gold. It is a series of badminton tournaments, sanctioned by Badminton World Federation (BWF) since 2007. The World Badminton Grand Prix has been sanctioned by the International Badminton Federation since 1983.

Men's doubles
| Year | Tournament | Partner | Opponent | Score | Result |
|---|---|---|---|---|---|
| 2008 | German Open | (South Korea) Lee Jae-jin | (South Korea) Jung Jae-sung (South Korea) Lee Yong-dae | 21–13, 21–19 | (gold) Winner |
| 2007 | Thailand Open | (South Korea) Lee Jae-jin | (South Korea) Jung Jae-sung (South Korea) Lee Yong-dae | 21–19, 19–21, 21–9 | (gold) Winner |
| 2007 | German Open | (South Korea) Lee Jae-jin | (South Korea) Jung Jae-sung (South Korea) Lee Yong-dae | 21–18, 22–20 | (gold) Winner |
| 2006 | Korea Open | (South Korea) Lee Jae-jin | (United States) Tony Gunawan (Indonesia) Candra Wijaya | 18–21, 18–21 | (silver) Runner-up |
| 2006 | Thailand Open | (South Korea) Lee Jae-jin | (South Korea) Jung Jae-sung (South Korea) Lee Yong-dae | Walkover | (silver) Runner-up |

Mixed doubles
| Year | Tournament | Partner | Opponent | Score | Result |
|---|---|---|---|---|---|
| 2003 | U.S. Open | (South Korea) Lee Eun-woo | (United States) Tony Gunawan (United States) Eti Gunawan | 5–15, 9–15 | (silver) Runner-up |

BWF Grand Prix Gold tournament
BWF Grand Prix tournament

=== BWF International Challenge/Series ===
Men's doubles
| Year | Tournament | Partner | Opponent | Score | Result |
|---|---|---|---|---|---|
| 2005 | Vietnam Satellite | (South Korea) Han Sang-hoon | (Malaysia) Mohd Zakry Abdul Latif (Malaysia) Gan Teik Chai | 15–4, 14–17, 4–15 | (silver) Runner-up |
| 2005 | Thailand Satellite | (South Korea) Han Sang-hoon | (South Korea) Jeon Jun-bum (South Korea) Kim Dae-sung | 15–6, 15–12 | (gold) Winner |
| 2004 | Vietnam Satellite | (South Korea) Jung Jae-sung | (Indonesia) Rian Sukmawan (Indonesia) Yoga Ukikasah | 15–17, 7–15 | (silver) Runner-up |
| 2003 | Canada International | (South Korea) Jung Hoon-min | (Canada) Keith Chan (Canada) William Milroy | 17–15, 15–7 | (gold) Winner |
| 2003 | Norwegian International | (South Korea) Lee Jae-jin | (England) David Lindley (England) Kristian Roebuck | 15–10, 15–2 | (gold) Winner |
| 2003 | Hungarian International | (South Korea) Lee Jae-jin | (South Korea) Jeon Jun-bum (South Korea) Yoo Yeon-seong | 15–12, 15–12 | (gold) Winner |

Mixed doubles
| Year | Tournament | Partner | Opponent | Score | Result |
|---|---|---|---|---|---|
| 2012 | Korean International | (South Korea) Hwang Yu-mi | (South Korea) Lee Jae-jin (South Korea) Kim Jin-ock | 21–15, 21–14 | (gold) Winner |
| 2005 | Vietnam Satellite | (South Korea) Oh Seul-ki | (South Korea) Jeon Jun-bum (South Korea) Ha Jung-eun | 7–15, 15–6, 15–12 | (gold) Winner |
| 2003 | Canada International | (South Korea) Lee Eun-woo | (Canada) Mike Beres (Canada) Jody Patrick | 17–15, 15–7 | (gold) Winner |

BWF International Challenge tournament
BWF International Series tournament
