= Gan Teik Chai =

Malaysian badminton player (1983–2023)

Gan Teik Chai 颜德财
Personal information
- Born: 5 February 1983 Kedah, Malaysia
- Died: 5 August 2023 (aged 40) Surabaya, Indonesia

Sport
- Country: Malaysia
- Sport: Badminton
- Handedness: Left

Men's & mixed doubles
- Highest ranking: 12 (MD 21 January 2010); 83 (XD 21 April 2011)
- BWF profile
Medal record
Men's badminton
Representing Malaysia
Southeast Asian Games
Bronze medal – third place	2007 Nakhon Ratchasima	Men's doubles
Bronze medal – third place	2007 Nakhon Ratchasima	Men's team
Asian Junior Championships
Bronze medal – third place	2000 Kyoto	Boys' team

James Gan Teik Chai (颜德财) (5 February 1983 – 5 August 2023) was a Malaysian badminton player. He won the men's doubles title at the 2004 French International tournament partnered with Koo Kien Keat. He also won the 2009 Australian Open Grand Prix tournament with Tan Bin Shen. Teamed-up with Ong Soon Hock, he won the 2012 BWF International tournament in Mauritius, Argentina, and Brazil.

== Personal life and death ==
Gan was married to Esther Ng and had two sons. On 4 August 2023, he died of a heart attack while in Indonesia. He was 40.

== Achievements ==
=== Southeast Asian Games ===
Men's doubles
Year	Venue	Partner	Opponent	Score	Result
2007	Wongchawalitkul University; Nakhon Ratchasima, Thailand	(Malaysia) Lin Woon Fui	(Indonesia) Markis Kido (Indonesia) Hendra Setiawan	15–21, 17–21	Bronze

=== BWF Superseries ===
The BWF Superseries, which was launched on 14 December 2006 and implemented in 2007, was a series of elite badminton tournaments, sanctioned by the Badminton World Federation (BWF). BWF Superseries levels were Superseries and Superseries Premier. A season of Superseries consisted of twelve tournaments around the world that had been introduced since 2011. Successful players were invited to the Superseries Finals, which were held at the end of each year.

Men's doubles
Year	Tournament	Partner	Opponent	Score	Result
2008	Singapore Open	(Malaysia) Lin Woon Fui	(Malaysia) Mohd Zakry Abdul Latif (Malaysia) Mohd Fairuzizuan Mohd Tazari	18–21, 17–21	(silver) Runner-up

BWF Super Series Finals tournament
BWF Super Series Premier tournament
BWF Super Series tournament

=== BWF Grand Prix ===
The BWF Grand Prix had two levels, the Grand Prix and Grand Prix Gold. It was a series of badminton tournaments sanctioned by the Badminton World Federation (BWF) and played between 2007 and 2017.

Men's doubles
Year	Tournament	Partner	Opponent	Score	Result
2009	Malaysia Grand Prix Gold	(Malaysia) Tan Bin Shen	(Malaysia) Koo Kien Keat (Malaysia) Tan Boon Heong	11–21, 13–21	(silver) Runner-up
2009	Australian Open	(Malaysia) Tan Bin Shen	(India) Rupesh Kumar K. T. (India) Sanave Thomas	21–13, 21–11	(gold) Winner
2010	India Grand Prix	(Malaysia) Tan Bin Shen	(Indonesia) Mohammad Ahsan (Indonesia) Bona Septano	21–19, 15–21, 14–21	(silver) Runner-up
2012	Dutch Open	(Malaysia) Ong Soon Hock	(Indonesia) Markis Kido (Indonesia) Alvent Yulianto	21–18, 13–21, 14–21	(silver) Runner-up

Mixed doubles
Year	Tournament	Partner	Opponent	Score	Result
2010	India Grand Prix	(Malaysia) Ng Hui Lin	(China) Liu Peixuan (China) Tang Jinhua	17–21, 17–21	(silver) Runner-up

BWF Grand Prix Gold tournament
BWF Grand Prix tournament

=== BWF International Challenge/Series ===
Men's doubles
Year	Tournament	Partner	Opponent	Score	Result
2003	Malaysia Satellite	(Malaysia) Koo Kien Keat	(Malaysia) Hong Chieng Hun (Malaysia) Lin Woon Fui	15–7, 17–16	(gold) Winner
2004	French International	(Malaysia) Koo Kien Keat	(Denmark) Joachim Fischer Nielsen (Denmark) Jesper Larsen	15–6, 17–15	(gold) Winner
2006	Malaysia Satellite	(Malaysia) Mohd Zakry Abdul Latif	(Malaysia) Ong Soon Hock (Malaysia) Tan Bin Shen	26–24, 18–21, 15–21	(silver) Runner-up
2008	Malaysia International	(Malaysia) Ong Jian Guo	(Malaysia) Goh Wei Shem (Malaysia) Lin Woon Fui	19–21, 18–21	(silver) Runner-up
2012	Mauritius International	(Malaysia) Ong Soon Hock	(Mauritius) Denneshsing Baboolall (Mauritius) Yoni Louison	21–9, 21–10	(gold) Winner
2012	Argentina International	(Malaysia) Ong Soon Hock	(Chile) Cristian Araya (Chile) Esteban Mujica	21–14, 21–15	(gold) Winner
2012	Brazil International	(Malaysia) Ong Soon Hock	(United States) Phillip Chew (United States) Sattawat Pongnairat	21–14, 21–14	(gold) Winner

BWF International Challenge tournament
BWF International Series tournament
BWF Future Series tournament
