= 2006 All England Open Badminton Championships =

2006 All England Open
Tournament details
- Dates: 17 January 2006 – 22 January 2006
- Edition: 96th
- Level: World Grand Prix 4 Stars
- Total prize money: US$125,000
- Venue: National Indoor Arena
- Location: Birmingham, England

Champions
- Men's singles: (China) Lin Dan
- Women's singles: (China) Xie Xingfang
- Men's doubles: (Denmark) Jens Eriksen (Denmark) Martin Lundgaard Hansen
- Women's doubles: (China) Gao Ling (China) Huang Sui
- Mixed doubles: (China) Zhang Jun (China) Gao Ling

The 2006 All England Open (officially known as the YONEX All England Open Badminton Championships 2006 for sponsorship reasons) was badminton tournament which took place at the National Indoor Arena in Birmingham, England, on from 17 to 22 January 2006 and had a total purse of $125,000.

== Tournament ==
The 2006 All England Open was the third tournament of the 2006 IBF World Grand Prix and also part of the All England Open championships, which had been held since 1899.

=== Venue ===
This international tournament was held at National Indoor Arena in Birmingham, England.

=== Point distribution ===
Below is the point distribution table for each phase of the tournament based on the IBF points system for the IBF World Grand Prix 4-star event.

Winner	Runner-up	3/4	5/8	9/16	17/32	33/64	65/128	129/256	257/512
4,200	3,570	2,940	2,310	1,680	1,050	420	210	84	42

=== Prize pool ===
The total prize money for this tournament was US$125,000. The distribution of the prize money was in accordance with IBF regulations.

Event	Winner	Finalist	Semi-finals	Quarter-finals	Last 16
Men's singles	$10,000	$5,000	$2,500	$1,250	$500
Women's singles	$8,625	$4,125	$2,250	$1,125	—N/a
Men's doubles	$9,000	$5,000	$3,000	$1,750	—N/a
Women's doubles	$7,625	$5,000	$2,750	$1,375	—N/a
Mixed doubles	$7,625	$5,000	$2,750	$1,375	—N/a

== Men's singles ==
=== Seeds ===
1. (China) Lin Dan (champion)
2. (China) Bao Chunlai (second round)
3. (Malaysia) Lee Chong Wei (semi-finals)
4. (Denmark) Peter Gade (semi-finals)
5. (South Korea) Lee Hyun-il (final)
6. (Denmark) Kenneth Jonassen (quarter-finals)
7. (China) Chen Hong (quarter-finals)
8. (Malaysia) Muhammad Hafiz Hashim (first round)
9. (Malaysia) Wong Choong Hann (third round)
10. (Hong Kong) Ng Wei (third round)
11. (Malaysia) Kuan Beng Hong (third round)
12. (Thailand) Boonsak Ponsana (third round)
13. (South Korea) Shon Seung-mo (second round)
14. (Denmark) Niels Christian Kaldau (second round)
15. (Japan) Shōji Satō (quarter-finals)
16. (Malaysia) Sairul Amar Ayob (third round)

=== Finals ===
Semi-finals
1	(China) Lin Dan	15	10	17
3	(Malaysia) Lee Chong Wei	9	15	14
4	(Denmark) Peter Gade	15	8	1
5	(South Korea) Lee Hyun-il	3	15	15

Final
1	(China) Lin Dan	15	15
5	(South Korea) Lee Hyun-il	7	7

=== Top half ===
==== Section 1 ====
First Round
1	(China) Lin D	15	9	15
(South Korea) Jang Y-s	5	15	9
(Denmark) K Ødum	9	15	15
(Netherlands) E Pang	15	4	2
9	(Malaysia) Wong C H	15	15
(India) A Bhat	9	9
(England) A Ghaffar	15	15
Q3	(China) Zhang Y	5	1
6	(Denmark) K Jonassen	15	15
(Japan) S Sasaki	6	11
(England) T Honey	15	15
(Republic of Ireland) S Evans	3	1
16	(Malaysia) S A Ayob	15	15
(France) J-M Lefort	5	11
(Denmark) P Mikkelsen	13	11
Q1	(Sweden) V Wibowo	15	15

Second Round
1	(China) Lin D	5	15	15
(Denmark) K Ødum	15	6	4
9	(Malaysia) Wong C H	15	15
(England) A Ghaffar	10	5
6	(Denmark) K Jonassen	15	15
(England) T Honey	4	3
16	(Malaysia) S A Ayob	15	9	15
Q1	(Sweden) V Wibowo	9	15	4

Third Round
1	(China) Lin D	15	15
9	(Malaysia) Wong C H	6	5
6	(Denmark) K Jonassen	15	15
16	(Malaysia) S A Ayob	3	7

Quarter-finals
1	(China) Lin D	15	15
6	(Denmark) K Jonassen	10	3

==== Section 2 ====
First Round
3	(Malaysia) Lee C W	15	15
(New Zealand) G Bellingham	3	2
(Denmark) B Rafn	9	7
(Germany) B Joppien	15	15
14	(Denmark) N C Kaldau	17	15
(Thailand) P Sapkulchananart	16	12
(England) N Kidd	9	6
Q4	(China) Wu YY	15	15
7	(China) Chen H	15	15
(Japan) Y Nakanishi	8	7
(Denmark) J-K Leth	5	11
(Russia) S Pukhov	15	15
13	(South Korea) Shon S-m	15	15
(Canada) A Dabeka	10	12
(Malaysia) Yeoh K B	15	15
Q7	(Ukraine) V Druzchenko	7	7

Second Round
3	(Malaysia) Lee C W	15	7	15
(Germany) B Joppien	6	15	3
14	(Denmark) N C Kaldau	11	0^{r}
Q4	(China) Wu YY	15	6
7	(China) Chen H	15	15
(Russia) S Pukhov	7	4
13	(South Korea) Shon S-m	8	16
(Malaysia) Yeoh K B	15	17

Third Round
3	(Malaysia) Lee C W	15	15
Q4	(China) Wu YY	8	0
7	(China) Chen H	15	15
(Malaysia) Yeoh K B	11	11

Quarter-finals
3	(Malaysia) Lee C W	9	17	15
7	(China) Chen H	15	14	2

=== Bottom half ===
==== Section 3 ====
First Round
(England) N Rice	9	11
Q2	(England) C Baxter	15	15
PFQ	(England) R Ouseph	9	13
12	(Thailand) B Ponsana	15	15
(Denmark) J Fischer Nielsen	15	15
(Guatemala) P Yang	4	2
(China) Chen J	17	15
8	(Malaysia) M H Hashim	14	5
(Denmark) K Ipsen	8	10
Q6	(Japan) K Saeki	15	15
(New Zealand) J Gordon	9	3
10	(Hong Kong) Ng W	15	15
(Malaysia) Pei W C	15	15
(Wales) M Lewis	6	7
(South Korea) Park S-h	4	9
4	(Denmark) P Gade	15	15

Second Round
Q2	(England) C Baxter	8	8
12	(Thailand) B Ponsana	15	15
(Denmark) J Fischer Nielsen	5	8
(China) Chen J	15	15
Q6	(Japan) K Saeki	15	6	0
10	(Hong Kong) Ng W	9	15	15
(Malaysia) Pei W C	1	4
4	(Denmark) P Gade	15	15

Third Round
12	(Thailand) B Ponsana	14	14
(China) Chen J	17	17
10	(Hong Kong) Ng W	8	5
4	(Denmark) P Gade	15	15

Quarter-finals
(China) Chen J	6	13
4	(Denmark) P Gade	15	15

==== Section 4 ====
First Round
(England) A Smith	6	15	11
Q5	(Denmark) C Lind Thomsen	15	5	15
(Canada) B Milroy	10	8
11	(Malaysia) Kuan B H	15	15
(Denmark) M Christensen	15	15
(Czech Republic) P Koukal	12	11
(India) C Anand	0	3
5	(South Korea) Lee H-i	15	15
(Malaysia) Lee T S	15	15
(Indonesia) S D Kuncoro	5	8
(France) A Rasidi	2	3
15	(Japan) S Satō	15	15
(Denmark) J Persson	12	15	15
(Netherlands) D Palyama	15	4	7
(New Zealand) J Moody	9	11
2	(China) Bao CL	15	15

Second Round
Q5	(Denmark) C Lind Thomsen	12	9
11	(Malaysia) Kuan B H	15	15
(Denmark) M Christensen	7	1
5	(South Korea) Lee H-i	15	15
(Malaysia) Lee T S	12	5
15	(Japan) S Satō	15	15
(Denmark) J Persson	17	10
2	(China) Bao CL	15	5^{r}

Third Round
11	(Malaysia) Kuan B H	1	5
5	(South Korea) Lee H-i	15	15
15	(Japan) S Satō	15	3
(Denmark) J Persson	1	1^{r}

Quarter-finals
5	(South Korea) Lee H-i	15	15
15	(Japan) S Satō	7	11

== Women’s singles ==
=== Seeds ===
1. (China) Zhang Ning (final)
2. (China) Xie Xingfang (champion)
3. (Hong Kong) Wang Chen (quarter-finals)
4. (France) Pi Hongyan (semi-finals)
5. (Germany) Huaiwen Xu (quarter-finals)
6. (Netherlands) Yao Jie (withdrew)
7. (Netherlands) Mia Audina (semi-finals)
8. (England) Tracey Hallam (second round)

=== Finals ===
Semi-finals
1	(China) Zhang Ning	11	9	11
4	(France) Pi Hongyan	3	11	3
7	(Netherlands) Mia Audina	13	0	7
2	(China) Xie Xingfang	11	11	11

Final
1	(China) Zhang Ning	6	11	2
2	(China) Xie Xingfang	11	4	11

=== Top half ===
==== Section 1 ====
First Round
(Germany) J Schenk	11	11
(Denmark) T Hoey	4	1
(England) J Pittard	9	11	11
(Bulgaria) L Zetchiri	11	8	9
(South Korea) Jang S-y	5	9
(Canada) A Rice	11	11
(Japan) E Hirose	11	11
Q4	(Netherlands) J Meulendijks	1	2

Second Round
1	(China) Zhang N	11	11
(Hong Kong) Yip P Y	4	2
(Germany) J Schenk	11	11
(England) J Pittard	3	3
PFQ	(Finland) N Weckström	7	5
(New Zealand) R Hindley	11	11
(Canada) A Rice	6	0
(Japan) E Hirose	11	11

Third Round
1	(China) Zhang N	11	11
(Germany) J Schenk	4	3
(New Zealand) R Hindley	4	1
(Japan) E Hirose	11	11

Quarter-finals
1	(China) Zhang N	11	11
(Japan) E Hirose	8	6

==== Section 2 ====
First Round
(South Korea) Hwang H-y	11	11
(Thailand) S Ponsana	3	5
(China) Lu L	11	11
(Russia) E Karachkova	2	5
(Germany) P Overzier	11	11
(Scotland) Y Wemyss	9	5
(Netherlands) R van Cutsen	5	11
Q2	(Chinese Taipei) Chien Y-c	11	13

Second Round
4	(France) Pi HY	11	11
(Malaysia) S Mudukasan	1	0
(South Korea) Hwang H-y	11	9	2
(China) Lu L	4	11	11
8	(England) T Hallam	9	11
(Chinese Taipei) Cheng S-c	11	13
(Germany) P Overzier	11	7	4
Q2	(Chinese Taipei) Chien Y-c	5	11	11

Third Round
4	(France) Pi HY	11	11
(China) Lu L	6	4
(Chinese Taipei) Cheng S-c	11	11
Q2	(Chinese Taipei) Chien Y-c	8	9

Quarter-finals
4	(France) Pi HY	11	11
(Chinese Taipei) Cheng S-c	1	1

=== Bottom half ===
==== Section 3 ====
First Round
(South Korea) Lee Y-h	11	11
Q1	(Denmark) N Brosolat Jensen	3	8
(China) Jiang YJ	11	11
(Denmark) C Sørensen	1	4
(Germany) N Grether	11	11
(Finland) A Nieminen	4	8
(England) E Cann	3	1
(Japan) Y Hirayama	11	11

Second Round
(South Korea) Lee Y-h	3	7
(China) Jiang YJ	11	11
(Estonia) K Tolmoff	6	6
7	(Netherlands) M Audina	11	11
(Germany) N Grether	9	7
(Japan) Y Hirayama	11	11
(Thailand) M Meemek	7	6
3	(Hong Kong) Wang C	11	11

Third Round
(China) Jiang YJ	5	11	6
7	(Netherlands) M Audina	11	6	11
(Japan) Y Hirayama	7	7
3	(Hong Kong) Wang C	11	11

Quarter-finals
7	(Netherlands) M Audina	9	11	11
3	(Hong Kong) Wang C	11	7	7

==== Section 4 ====
First Round
(Denmark) T Rasmussen	11	11
Q3	(South Korea) Lee H-j	7	9
(England) J Mann	5	1
(Malaysia) Wong M C	11	11
(Japan) K Mori	11	11
(Switzerland) J Cicognini	8	2
(South Korea) Seo Y-h	9	11	11
(Scotland) S Hughes	11	6	9

Second Round
(Denmark) T Rasmussen	2	6
(Malaysia) Wong M C	11	11
(Canada) C Reid	1	1
5	(Germany) HW Xu	11	11
(Japan) K Mori	11	11
(South Korea) Seo Y-h	3	3
(New Zealand) R Bellingham	4	4
2	(China) Xie XF	11	11

Third Round
(Malaysia) Wong M C	5	9
5	(Germany) HW Xu	11	11
(Japan) K Mori	6	0
2	(China) Xie XF	11	11

Quarter-finals
5	(Germany) HW Xu	2	5
2	(China) Xie XF	11	11

== Men's doubles ==
=== Seeds ===
1. (Indonesia) Sigit Budiarto / Candra Wijaya (second round)
2. (Denmark) Jens Eriksen / Martin Lundgaard Hansen (champions)
3. (China) Cai Yun / Fu Haifeng (third round)
4. (Indonesia) Luluk Hadiyanto / Alvent Yulianto (quarter-finals)
5. (Denmark) Mathias Boe / Carsten Mogensen (third round)
6. (Indonesia) Markis Kido / Hendra Setiawan (second round)
7. (Malaysia) Chan Chong Ming / Koo Kien Keat (third round)
8. (Denmark) Jonas Rasmussen / Peter Steffensen (third round)

=== Finals ===
Semi-finals
(Malaysia) Choong Tan Fook (Malaysia) Lee Wan Wah	15	15
(Malaysia) Robert Lin Woon Fui (Malaysia) Mohd Fairuzizuan Mohd Tazari	8	7
(Malaysia) Mohd Zakry Abdul Latif (Malaysia) Gan Teik Chai	14	9
2	(Denmark) Jens Eriksen (Denmark) Martin Lundgaard Hansen	17	15

Final
(Malaysia) Choong Tan Fook (Malaysia) Lee Wan Wah	6	17	2
2	(Denmark) Jens Eriksen (Denmark) Martin Lundgaard Hansen	15	14	15

=== Top half ===
==== Section 1 ====
First Round
(Netherlands) R Bosch (Netherlands) J Wouters	4	0
(Japan) K Masuda (Japan) T Ōtsuka	15	15
(England) I Palethorpe (England) K Roebuck	15	15
(Russia) V Ivanov (Russia) V Malkov	2	4
(Hong Kong) Liu K W (Hong Kong) A S Njoto	9	13
(South Korea) Jung J-s (South Korea) Lee Y-d	15	15
(France) J-M Lefort (France) S Vincent	4	13
(Thailand) S Anukritayawon (Thailand) N Saengsila	15	15

Second Round
1	(Indonesia) S Budiarto (Indonesia) C Wijaya	15	8	10
(Malaysia) Choong T F (Malaysia) Lee W W	9	15	15
(Japan) K Masuda (Japan) T Ōtsuka	15	15
(England) I Palethorpe (England) K Roebuck	1	12
7	(Malaysia) Chan C M (Malaysia) Koo K K	15	15
(Scotland) D T. Forbes (Scotland) S Kerr	3	4
(South Korea) Jung J-s (South Korea) Lee Y-d	15	15
(Thailand) S Anukritayawon (Thailand) N Saengsila	1	5

Third Round
(Malaysia) Choong T F (Malaysia) Lee W W	15	15
(Japan) K Masuda (Japan) T Ōtsuka	11	12
7	(Malaysia) Chan C M (Malaysia) Koo K K	0^{r}
(South Korea) Jung J-s (South Korea) Lee Y-d	10

Quarter-finals
(Malaysia) Choong T F (Malaysia) Lee W W	15	15
(South Korea) Jung J-s (South Korea) Lee Y-d	6	4

==== Section 2 ====
First Round
(Denmark) A Kristiansen (Denmark) S Mollyhus	4	6
(Malaysia) R Lin W F (Malaysia) M F Mohd Tazari	15	15
(Wales) J Morgan (Wales) J Phillips	7	7
PFQ	(England) R Adcock (England) R Middleton	15	15
(Denmark) T Laybourn (Denmark) L Paaske	15	15
Q1	(Russia) V Durkin (Russia) A Nikolaenko	9	10
(England) E Foster (England) M Honey	15	8	8
(Germany) M Fuchs (Germany) R Spitko	11	15	15

Second Round
3	(China) Cai Y (China) Fu HF	15	15
(New Zealand) G Bellingham (New Zealand) C Cooper	9	3
(Malaysia) R Lin W F (Malaysia) M F Mohd Tazari	15	15
PFQ	(England) R Adcock (England) R Middleton	8	6
5	(Denmark) M Boe (Denmark) C Mogensen	15	15
(Switzerland) M Andrey (Switzerland) C Bösiger	1	5
(Denmark) T Laybourn (Denmark) L Paaske	15	15
(Germany) M Fuchs (Germany) R Spitko	8	11

Third Round
3	(China) Cai Y (China) Fu HF	3	6
(Malaysia) R Lin W F (Malaysia) M F Mohd Tazari	15	15
5	(Denmark) M Boe (Denmark) C Mogensen	15	9	11
(Denmark) T Laybourn (Denmark) L Paaske	12	15	15

Quarter-finals
(Malaysia) R Lin W F (Malaysia) M F Mohd Tazari	13	15	15
(Denmark) T Laybourn (Denmark) L Paaske	15	12	7

=== Bottom half ===
==== Section 3 ====
First Round
(Wales) M Hughes (Wales) M Lewis	4	5
(Malaysia) M Z Abdul Latif (Malaysia) Gan T C	15	15
(Denmark) R Bonde (Denmark) K Henriksen	15	15
(South Africa) C Dednam (South Africa) D James	3	7
(Germany) K Hopp (Germany) I Kindervater	8	17	12
(South Korea) Kang M-w (South Korea) Yoo Y-s	15	16	15
(South Korea) Han S-h (South Korea) Hwang J-m	14	15
(Thailand) P Ngernsrisuk (Thailand) S Prapakamol	17	17

Second Round
(Malaysia) M Z Abdul Latif (Malaysia) Gan T C	15	15
(Denmark) R Bonde (Denmark) K Henriksen	11	3
PFQ	(Scotland) C Hill (Scotland) K Turnbull	0	0
8	(Denmark) J Rasmussen (Denmark) P Steffensen	15	15
(South Korea) Kang M-w (South Korea) Yoo Y-s	8	15	5
(Thailand) P Ngernsrisuk (Thailand) S Prapakamol	15	2	15
(England) S Archer (England) D Lindley	15	13	9
4	(Indonesia) L Hadiyanto (Indonesia) A Yulianto	11	15	15

Third Round
(Malaysia) M Z Abdul Latif (Malaysia) Gan T C	13	15	15
8	(Denmark) J Rasmussen (Denmark) P Steffensen	15	8	7
(Thailand) P Ngernsrisuk (Thailand) S Prapakamol	13	6
4	(Indonesia) L Hadiyanto (Indonesia) A Yulianto	15	15

Quarter-finals
(Malaysia) M Z Abdul Latif (Malaysia) Gan T C	15	15	15
4	(Indonesia) L Hadiyanto (Indonesia) A Yulianto	13	17	3

==== Section 4 ====
First Round
(China) Guo ZD (China) Xie ZB	15	15
(New Zealand) J Gordon (New Zealand) D Shirley	13	10
(South Korea) Jung T-k (South Korea) Lee J-j	15	15
(Japan) S Nakao (Japan) S Sakamoto	8	7
(Netherlands) E Pang (Netherlands) K Ridder	6	4
(France) M Popov (France) S Stoyanov	15	15
(England) C Langridge (England) C Tonks	12	15	15
(Russia) S Lunev (Russia) A Vasiljev	15	9	3

Second Round
(China) Guo ZD (China) Xie ZB	15	16	15
(South Korea) Jung T-k (South Korea) Lee J-j	12	17	8
(England) R Blair (England) A Clark	15	15
6	(Indonesia) M Kido (Indonesia) H Setiawan	11	8
(France) M Popov (France) S Stoyanov	15	15
(England) C Langridge (England) C Tonks	7	12
(Malaysia) Ong S H (Malaysia) Tan B S	9	8
2	(Denmark) J Eriksen (Denmark) M Lundgaard Hansen	15	15

Third Round
(China) Guo ZD (China) Xie ZB	15	15
(England) R Blair (England) A Clark	7	3
(France) M Popov (France) S Stoyanov	3	3
2	(Denmark) J Eriksen (Denmark) M Lundgaard Hansen	15	15

Quarter-finals
(China) Guo ZD (China) Xie ZB	12	8
2	(Denmark) J Eriksen (Denmark) M Lundgaard Hansen	15	15

== Women's doubles ==
=== Seeds ===
1. (China) Gao Ling / Huang Sui (champions)
2. (South Korea) Lee Hyo-jung / Lee Kyung-won (semi-finals)
3. (China) Yang Wei / Zhang Jiewen (final)
4. (England) Gail Emms / Donna Kellogg (quarter-finals)
5. (Thailand) Sathinee Chankrachangwong / Saralee Thungthongkam (second round)
6. (Malaysia) Chin Eei Hui / Wong Pei Tty (second round)
7. (China) Wei Yili / Zhang Yawen (semi-finals)
8. (Japan) Kumiko Ogura / Reiko Shiota (quarter-finals)

=== Finals ===
Semi-finals
1	(China) Gao Ling (China) Huang Sui	15	15
7	(China) Wei Yili (China) Zhang Yawen	11	9
3	(China) Yang Wei (China) Zhang Jiewen	15	15
2	(South Korea) Lee Hyo-jung (South Korea) Lee Kyung-won	4	9

Final
1	(China) Gao Ling (China) Huang Sui	6	15	15
3	(China) Yang Wei (China) Zhang Jiewen	15	11	2

=== Top half ===
==== Section 1 ====
First Round
1	(China) Gao L (China) Huang S	15	15
(England) N Munt (England) S Rayappan	4	4
SUB	(Denmark) P Harder (Denmark) M Schjøtt-Kristensen	15	15
(Canada) H Nichol (Canada) C Reid	6	9
8	(Japan) K Ogura (Japan) R Shiota	15	15
(Russia) E Dimova (Russia) A Efremova	4	1
(Germany) B Overzier (Germany) M Peiffer	11	6
(South Korea) Ha J-e (South Korea) Hwang Y-m	15	15

Second Round
1	(China) Gao L (China) Huang S	15	15
SUB	(Denmark) P Harder (Denmark) M Schjøtt-Kristensen	2	0
8	(Japan) K Ogura (Japan) R Shiota	15	7	17
(South Korea) Ha J-e (South Korea) Hwang Y-m	3	15	15

Quarter-finals
1	(China) Gao L (China) Huang S	15	15
8	(Japan) K Ogura (Japan) R Shiota	8	6

==== Section 2 ====
First Round
4	(England) G Emms (England) D Kellogg	15	15
(New Zealand) N Gordon (New Zealand) S Petersen	6	9
(Germany) N Grether (Germany) J Schenk	9	15	12
(Sweden) E Bergblom (Sweden) J Persson	15	9	15
7	(China) Wei YL (China) Zhang YW	15	15
(Thailand) D Aroonkesorn (Thailand) K Voravichitchaikul	3	5
(Malaysia) Mooi H Y (Malaysia) Ooi S A	15	15
Q1	(France) É Eymard (France) W Rahamawati	7	2

Second Round
4	(England) G Emms (England) D Kellogg	15	15
(Sweden) E Bergblom (Sweden) J Persson	10	9
7	(China) Wei YL (China) Zhang YW	15	15
(Malaysia) Mooi H Y (Malaysia) Ooi S A	5	3

Quarter-finals
4	(England) G Emms (England) D Kellogg	9	1
7	(China) Wei YL (China) Zhang YW	15	15

=== Bottom half ===
==== Section 3 ====
First Round
(England) J Nicholas (England) E Tripp	11	8
(Chinese Taipei) Cheng W-h (Chinese Taipei) Chien Y-c	15	15
(Thailand) M Meemek (Thailand) S Ponsana	3	9
6	(Malaysia) Chin E H (Malaysia) Wong P T	15	15
(Denmark) L Frier Kristiansen (Denmark) K R Juhl	7	12
(Indonesia) J Novita (Indonesia) G Polii	15	15
(New Zealand) R Bellingham (New Zealand) R Hindley	3	1
3	(China) Yang W (China) Zhang JW	15	15

Second Round
(Chinese Taipei) Cheng W-h (Chinese Taipei) Chien Y-c	15	15
6	(Malaysia) Chin E H (Malaysia) Wong P T	12	10
(Indonesia) J Novita (Indonesia) G Polii	8	9
3	(China) Yang W (China) Zhang JW	15	15

Quarter-finals
(Chinese Taipei) Cheng W-h (Chinese Taipei) Chien Y-c	5	3
3	(China) Yang W (China) Zhang JW	15	15

==== Section 4 ====
First Round
(Germany) S Marinello (Germany) K Piotrowski	10	0
(Japan) A Akao (Japan) T Matsuda	15	15
(Russia) V Sorokina (Russia) N Vislova	15	7
5	(Thailand) S Chankrachangwong (Thailand) S Thungthongkam	17	15
(Denmark) B Andersen (Denmark) M Schjoldager	15	15
PFQ	(Netherlands) R van Cutsen (Netherlands) P van Dooremalen	2	11
(Malaysia) Ang L P (Malaysia) Lim P S	5	6
2	(South Korea) Lee H-j (South Korea) Lee K-w	15	15

Second Round
(Japan) A Akao (Japan) T Matsuda	15	15
5	(Thailand) S Chankrachangwong (Thailand) S Thungthongkam	9	8
(Denmark) B Andersen (Denmark) M Schjoldager	0	2
2	(South Korea) Lee H-j (South Korea) Lee K-w	15	15

Quarter-finals
(Japan) A Akao (Japan) T Matsuda	8	9
2	(South Korea) Lee H-j (South Korea) Lee K-w	15	15

== Mixed doubles ==
=== Seeds ===
1. (South Korea) Lee Jae-jin / Lee Hyo-jung (semi-finals)
2. (Indonesia) Nova Widianto / Liliyana Natsir (semi-finals)
3. (England) Nathan Robertson / Gail Emms (final)
4. (China) Zhang Jun / Gao Ling (champions)
5. (Thailand) Sudket Prapakamol / Saralee Thungthongkam (quarter-finals)
6. (China) Xie Zhongbo / Zhang Yawen (quarter-finals)
7. (Denmark) Jens Eriksen / Mette Schjoldager (quarter-finals)
8. (Denmark) Thomas Laybourn / Kamilla Rytter Juhl (quarter-finals)

=== Finals ===
Semi-finals
1	(South Korea) Lee Jae-jin (South Korea) Lee Hyo-jung	16	11
4	(China) Zhang Jun (China) Gao Ling	17	15
3	(England) Nathan Robertson (England) Gail Emms	15	15
2	(Indonesia) Nova Widianto (Indonesia) Liliyana Natsir	12	4

Final
4	(China) Zhang Jun (China) Gao Ling	12	17	15
3	(England) Nathan Robertson (England) Gail Emms	15	14	1

=== Top half ===
==== Section 1 ====
First Round
1	(South Korea) Lee J-j (South Korea) Lee H-j	15	15
(Japan) K Masuda (Japan) T Matsuda	5	6
(England) A Clark (England) D Kellogg	15	15
(Thailand) N Saengsila (Thailand) D Aroonkesorn	2	6
7	(Denmark) J Eriksen (Denmark) M Schjoldager	15	15
(New Zealand) D Shirley (New Zealand) S Petersen	4	9
(Germany) K Hopp (Germany) B Overzier	4	13
Q2	(Denmark) C Mogensen (Denmark) L Frier Kristiansen	15	15

Second Round
1	(South Korea) Lee J-j (South Korea) Lee H-j	15	17
(England) A Clark (England) D Kellogg	9	15
7	(Denmark) J Eriksen (Denmark) M Schjoldager	15	15
Q2	(Denmark) C Mogensen (Denmark) L Frier Kristiansen	6	7

Quarter-finals
1	(South Korea) Lee J-j (South Korea) Lee H-j	15	15
7	(Denmark) J Eriksen (Denmark) M Schjoldager	12	5

==== Section 2 ====
First Round
4	(China) Zhang J (China) Gao L	15	15
(South Korea) Yoo Y-s (South Korea) Ha J-e	1	10
PFQ	(Netherlands) J Wouters (Netherlands) P van Dooremalen	3	17	7
(France) J-M Lefort (France) W Rahmawati	15	15	15
5	(Thailand) S Prapakamol (Thailand) S Thungthongkam	15	15
PFQ	(Malaysia) M F Mohd Tazari (Malaysia) Ooi S A	0	9
(England) D Lindley (England) S Rayappan	15	5	15
Q1	(England) S Archer (England) E Tripp	12	15	11

Second Round
4	(China) Zhang J (China) Gao L	15	15
(France) J-M Lefort (France) W Rahmawati	9	3
5	(Thailand) S Prapakamol (Thailand) S Thungthongkam	15	15
(England) D Lindley (England) S Rayappan	7	13

Quarter-finals
4	(China) Zhang J (China) Gao L	15	15
5	(Thailand) S Prapakamol (Thailand) S Thungthongkam	7	4

=== Bottom half ===
==== Section 3 ====
First Round
(Germany) I Kindervater (Germany) K Piotrowski	15	9	15
Q3	(Ukraine) V Druzchenko (Sweden) J Persson	10	15	2
(New Zealand) C Cooper (New Zealand) L Shirley	4	2
6	(China) Xie ZB (China) Zhang YW	15	15
(Denmark) J Rasmussen (Denmark) B Andersen	15	15	15
(Scotland) A Bowman (Scotland) K McEwan	17	5	12
(Japan) S Nakao (Japan) A Akao	4	3
3	(England) N Robertson (England) G Emms	15	15

Second Round
(Germany) I Kindervater (Germany) K Piotrowski	4	6
6	(China) Xie ZB (China) Zhang YW	15	15
(Denmark) J Rasmussen (Denmark) B Andersen	5	3
3	(England) N Robertson (England) G Emms	15	15

Quarter-finals
6	(China) Xie ZB (China) Zhang YW	5	15	13
3	(England) N Robertson (England) G Emms	15	8	15

==== Section 4 ====
First Round
(England) R Blair (England) N Munt	13	5
(Malaysia) Koo K K (Malaysia) Wong P T	15	15
(South Korea) Lee Y-d (South Korea) Hwang Y-m	13	15
8	(Denmark) T Laybourn (Denmark) K R Juhl	15	17
(Denmark) P Steffensen (Denmark) P Harder	9	13
(Thailand) S Anugritayawon (Thailand) K Voravichitchaikul	15	15
(Germany) M Fuchs (Germany) S Marinello	7	4
2	(Indonesia) N Widianto (Indonesia) L Natsir	15	15

Second Round
(Malaysia) Koo K K (Malaysia) Wong P T	15	11	8
8	(Denmark) T Laybourn (Denmark) K R Juhl	3	15	15
(Thailand) S Anugritayawon (Thailand) K Voravichitchaikul	2	12
2	(Indonesia) N Widianto (Indonesia) L Natsir	15	15

Quarter-finals
8	(Denmark) T Laybourn (Denmark) K R Juhl	15	9	11
2	(Indonesia) N Widianto (Indonesia) L Natsir	13	15	15

Preceded by 2006 German Open	IBF World Grand Prix; 2006 BWF season	Succeeded by 2006 China Masters
