= 2006 IBF World Championships – Women's singles =

Badminton championships

Women's singles at the 2006 IBF World Championships
- Venue: Palacio de Deportes de la Comunidad de Madrid
- Location: Madrid, Spain
- Dates: September 18, 2006 – September 24, 2006

Medalists
gold medal	Xie Xingfang	China
silver medal	Zhang Ning	China
bronze medal	Xu Huaiwen	Germany
bronze medal	Petra Overzier	Germany

The 2006 Women's singles brackets and results of the 2006 IBF World Championships.

== Seeds ==
1. (China) Zhang Ning
2. (Germany) Xu Huaiwen
3. (China) Xie Xingfang
4. (Hong Kong) Wang Chen
5. (France) Pi Hongyan
6. (Netherlands) Yao Jie
7. (Bulgaria) Petya Nedeltcheva
8. (Japan) Kaori Mori
9. (China) Jiang Yanjiao
10. (England) Tracey Hallam
11. (Japan) Eriko Hirose
12. (Hong Kong) Yip Pui Yin
13. (Malaysia) Wong Mew Choo
14. (Denmark) Tine Rasmussen
15. (South Korea) Hwang Hye-youn
16. (Germany) Petra Overzier

== Results ==
=== Section 1 ===
First Round
1	(China) Zhang Ning
Bye
(New Zealand) Rachel Hindley	22	16	12
(Singapore) Xing Aiying	20	21	21
13	(Malaysia) Wong Mew Choo	18	22	21
(Chinese Taipei) Chien Yu-chin	21	20	10
(Switzerland) Jeanine Cicognini	18	17
(Indonesia) Fransisca Ratnasari	21	'21
6	(Netherlands) Yao Jie	21	21
(Japan) Yu Hirayama	16	11
(Thailand) Monthila Meemek	21	21
(Cyprus) Maria Ioannou	13	4
10	(England) Tracey Hallam	21	21
(Spain) Lucia Tavera	6	4
(Russia) Ella Karachkova	3	21	21
(France) Perrine Lebuhanic	16	12

Second Round
1	(China) Zhang	21	21
(Singapore) Xing	8	8
13	(Malaysia) Wong	21	21
(Indonesia) Ratnasari	19	8
6	(Netherlands) Yao
(Thailand) Meemek	WO	WO
10	(England) Hallam	21	21
(Russia) Karachkova	9	8

Third Round
1	(China) Zhang	21	21
13	(Malaysia) Wong	13	13
(Thailand) Meemek	12	7
10	(England) Hallam	21	21

Quarter Finals
1	(China) Zhang	20	21	21
10	(England) Hallam	22	10	10

=== Section 2 ===
First Round
4	(Hong Kong) Wang Chen
Bye
(Australia) Tania Luiz	9	8
(Canada) Anna Rice	21	21
16	(Germany) Petra Overzier	22	19	21
(South Korea) Lee Yun-hwa	20	21	16
(Bulgaria) Linda Zechiri	21	21
(Wales) Harriet Johnson	12	17
8	(Japan) Kaori Mori	21	21
(Finland) Anu Nieminen	18	11
(Denmark) Anne Marie Pedersen	21	8	20
(Spain) Xin Xu Bing	17	21	22
9	(China) Jiang Yanjiao	21	21
(India) Saina Nehwal	10	16
(Slovenia) Maja Kersnik	17	16
(Sweden) Elin Bergblom	21	21

Second Round
4	(Hong Kong) Wang	21	21
(Canada) Rice	17	13
16	(Germany) Overzier	17	21	21
(Bulgaria) Zechiri	21	15	14
8	(Japan) Mori	21	21
(Spain) Xin	11	15
9	(China) Jiang	21	21
(Sweden) Bergblom	13	11

Third Round
4	(Hong Kong) Wang	20	21	20
16	(Germany) Overzier	22	4	22
8	(Japan) Mori	13	18
9	(China) Jiang	21	21

Quarter Finals
16	(Germany) Overzier	21	14	21
9	(China) Jiang	18	21	14

=== Section 3 ===
First Round
(Slovenia) Maja Tvrdy	21	21
(Malaysia) Sutheaswari Mudukasan	18	16
(Sweden) Sara Persson
12	(Hong Kong) Yip Pui Yin	WO	WO
(Finland) Nina Weckstrom	10	21	22
(Austria) Simone Prutsch	21	19	24
(Slovakia) Eva Sladekova	6	7
5	(France) Pi Hongyan	21	21
(Italy) Agnese Allegrini	20	22	15
(Poland) Kamila Augustyn	22	20	21
(Chinese Taipei) Cheng Shao-chieh	12	14
14	(Denmark) Tine Rasmussen	21	21
(United States) Shannon Pohl	5	12
(Netherlands) Rachel van Cutsen	21	21
(Estonia) Kati Tolmoff	14	14
3	(China) Xie Xingfang	21	21

Second Round
(Slovenia) Tvrdy	7	13
12	(Hong Kong) Yip	21	21
(Austria) Prutsch	11	8
5	(France) Pi	21	21
(Poland) Augustyn	18	13
14	(Denmark) Rasmussen	21	21
(Netherlands) Van Cutsen	13	16
3	(China) Xie	21	21

Third Round
12	(Hong Kong) Yip	20	12
5	(France) Pi	22	21
14	(Denmark) Rasmussen	14	6
3	(China) Xie	21	21

Quarter Finals
5	(France) Pi	17	10
3	(China) Xie	21	21

=== Section 4 ===
First Round
(Russia) Ekaterina Ananina	8	19
(Scotland) Susan Hughes	21	21
(England) Julia Mann	10	11
15	(South Korea) Hwang Hye-youn	21	21
(Canada) Charmaine Reid	10	14
(Singapore) Li Li	21	21
(Nigeria) Grace Daniel	3	13
7	(Bulgaria) Petya Nedeltcheva	21	21
(Ukraine) Larisa Griga	21	14	19
(India) Trupti Murgunde	17	21	21
(Thailand) Salakjit Ponsana	17	17
11	(Japan) Eriko Hirose	21	21
(Belgium) Nathalie Descamps	12	20
(Spain) Yoana Martínez	21	22
Bye
2	(Germany) Xu Huaiwen

Second Round
(Scotland) Hughes	21	21
15	(South Korea) Hwang	15	12
(Singapore) Li	21	19	15
7	(Bulgaria) Nedeltcheva	13	21	21
(India) Murgunde	21	16	12
11	(Japan) Hirose	6	21	21
(Spain) Martínez	19	18
2	(Germany) Xu	21	21

Third Round
(Scotland) Hughes	16	21	11
7	(Bulgaria) Nedeltcheva	21	14	21
11	(Japan) Hirose	19	10
2	(Germany) Xu	21	21

Quarter Finals
7	(Bulgaria) Nedeltcheva	14	21	16
2	(Germany) Xu	21	17	21

== Finals ==
Quarterfinals
1	(China) Zhang Ning	20	21	21
10	(England) Tracey Hallam	22	10	10
16	(Germany) Petra Overzier	21	14	21
9	(China) Jiang Yanjiao	18	21	14
5	(France) Pi Hongyan	17	10
3	(China) Xie Xingfang	21	21
7	(Bulgaria) Petya Nedeltcheva	14	21	16
2	(Germany) Xu Huaiwen	21	17	21

Semifinals
1	(China) Zhang Ning	21	21
16	(Germany) Petra Overzier	19	11
3	(China) Xie Xingfang	21	21
2	(Germany) Xu Huaiwen	12	10

Finals
1	(China) Zhang Ning	16	14
3	(China) Xie Xingfang	21	21
