= 2009 BWF World Championships – Women's singles =

Badminton championships

Women's singles at the 2009 BWF World Championships
- Venue: Gachibowli Indoor Stadium
- Location: Hyderabad, India
- Dates: August 10, 2009 – August 16, 2009

Medalists
gold medal	Lu Lan	China
silver medal	Xie Xingfang	China
bronze medal	Wang Lin	China
bronze medal	Pi Hongyan	France

The 2009 BWF World Championships was the 17th tournament of the World Badminton Championships. It was held at the Gachibowli Indoor Stadium in Hyderabad, Andhra Pradesh, India, from 10 to 16 August 2009. Following the results of the women's singles.

== Seeds ==
1. (Hong Kong) Zhou Mi (quarter-final)
2. (China) Wang Lin (semi-final)
3. (Denmark) Tine Rasmussen (quarter-final)
4. (China) Wang Yihan (third round)
5. (China) Xie Xingfang (final)
6. (India) Saina Nehwal (quarter-final)
7. (China) Lu Lan (champion)
8. (France) Pi Hongyan (semi-final)
9. (Hong Kong) Wang Chen (third round)
10. (Bulgaria) Petya Nedelcheva (third round)
11. (Germany) Juliane Schenk (quarter-final)
12. (South Korea) Hwang Hye-youn (third round)
13. (Hong Kong) Yip Pui Yin (third round)
14. (Malaysia) Wong Mew Choo (second round)
15. (Indonesia) Maria Kristin Yulianti (third round)
16. (Netherlands) Judith Meulendijks (second round)

== Main stage ==
=== Section 1 ===
First round
(Denmark) N Brosolat Jensen	wo
(New Zealand) M Chan Ky
14	(Malaysia) Wong MC	21	21
(United States) S Pohl	4	6
(Republic of Ireland) C Magee	13	9
(Japan) A Goto	21	21
(Singapore) Fu MT	15	15
(Bulgaria) L Zechiri	21	21
16	(Netherlands) J Meulendijks
(Canada) A Rice	wo
(Lithuania) A Stapusaityte	8	7
(Thailand) S Ponsana	21	21

Second round
1	(Hong Kong) Zhou M	21	21
(New Zealand) M Chan Ky	11	15
14	(Malaysia) Wong MC	21	12	21
(Japan) A Goto	18	21	23
5	(China) Xie XF	23	18
(Bulgaria) L Zechiri	21	10^{r}
16	(Netherlands) J Meulendijks	21	16	11
(Thailand) S Ponsana	11	21	21

Third round
1	(Hong Kong) Zhou M	21	21
(Japan) A Goto	11	18
5	(China) Xie XF	21	14	21
(Thailand) S Ponsana	16	21	9

Quarterfinals
1	(Hong Kong) Zhou M	15	18
5	(China) Xie XF	21	21

=== Section 2 ===
First round
(Finland) A Nieminen	19	20
(Scotland) S Egelstaff	21	22
11	(Germany) J Schenk	21	21
(India) A Mutatkar	8	12
(Egypt) H Hosny	8	14
(Russia) E Diehl	21	21
(South Korea) Kim M-h	16	19
(Chinese Taipei) Hung S-h	21	21
15	(Indonesia) MK Yulianti	21	21
(Sweden) S Hansson	6	2
(Belgium) L Tan	21	22
(Ukraine) E Prus	18	20

Second round
4	(China) Wang YH	21	21
(Scotland) S Egelstaff	13	16
11	(Germany) J Schenk	21	21
(Russia) E Diehl	9	11
8	(France) Pi HY	21	21
(Chinese Taipei) Hung S-h	13	12
15	(Indonesia) MK Yulianti	21	21
(Belgium) L Tan	11	11

Third round
4	(China) Wang YH	18	15
11	(Germany) J Schenk	21	21
8	(France) Pi HY	21	21
15	(Indonesia) MK Yulianti	13	14

Quarterfinals
11	(Germany) J Schenk	21	15	19
11	(France) Pi HY	15	21	21

=== Section 3 ===
First round
(Thailand) P Buranaprasertsuk	21	21
(Malaysia) L Cheah	6	18
(Chinese Taipei) Chen H-h	19	10
9	(Hong Kong) Wang C	21	21
(Belgium) N Descamps	9	8
(Indonesia) A Firdasari	21	21
(Ukraine) L Griga	16	5
7	(China) Lu L	21	21
(India) S Gokhale	15	14
(Netherlands) Yao J	21	21
(Belarus) A Zaitsava	11	13
13	(Hong Kong) Yip PY	21	21
(New Zealand) R Hindley	wo
(Canada) C Reid	wo

Second round
(Thailand) P Buranaprasertsuk	21	15	16
9	(Hong Kong) Wang C	13	21	21
(Indonesia) A Firdasari	17	8
7	(China) Lu L	21	21
(Netherlands) Yao J	21	19	19
13	(Hong Kong) Yip PY	17	21	21
Bye
3	(Denmark) T Rasmussen

Third round
9	(Hong Kong) Wang C	18	14
7	(China) Lu L	21	21
13	(Hong Kong) Yip PY	13	21	15
3	(Denmark) T Rasmussen	21	11	21

Quarterfinals
7	(China) Lu L	21	21
3	(Denmark) T Rasmussen	15	13

=== Section 4 ===
First round
(Singapore) Xing AY	21	21
(Czech Republic) K Ludíková	15	9
(France) E Chanteur	12	10
10	(Bulgaria) P Nedelcheva	21	21
(Poland) O Konon	wo
(Russia) A Prokopenko
(Switzerland) J Cicognini	21	12	9
(Estonia) K Tolmoff	19	21	21
(Mauritius) K Foo Kune	5	9
12	(South Korea) Hwang H-y	21	21
(Slovenia) M Tvrdy	9	12
(Japan) Y Hirayama	21	21

Second round
(Singapore) Xing AY	24	21	6
10	(Bulgaria) P Nedelcheva	26	19	21
(Russia) A Prokopenko	10	17
6	(India) S Nehwal	21	21
(Estonia) K Tolmoff	10	12
12	(South Korea) Hwang H-y	21	21
(Japan) Y Hirayama	13	12
2	(China) Wang L	21	21

Third round
10	(Bulgaria) P Nedelcheva	21	18	10
6	(India) S Nehwal	18	21	21
12	(South Korea) Hwang H-y	10	21
2	(China) Wang L	21	23

Quarterfinals
6	(India) S Nehwal	16	19
2	(China) Wang L	21	21

== Final stage ==
Quarter-finals
1	(Hong Kong) Zhou Mi	15	18
5	(China) Xie Xingfang	21	21
11	(Germany) Juliane Schenk	21	15	19
8	(France) Pi Hongyan	15	21	21
7	(China) Lu Lan	21	21
3	(Denmark) Tine Rasmussen	15	13
6	(India) Saina Nehwal	16	19
2	(China) Wang Lin	21	21

Semi-finals
5	(China) Xie Xingfang	21	21
8	(France) Pi Hongyan	18	8
7	(China) Lu Lan	21	21
2	(China) Wang Lin	18	19

Final
5	(China) Xie Xingfang	21	12
7	(China) Lu Lan	23	21
