= Eriko Hirose =

Japanese badminton player

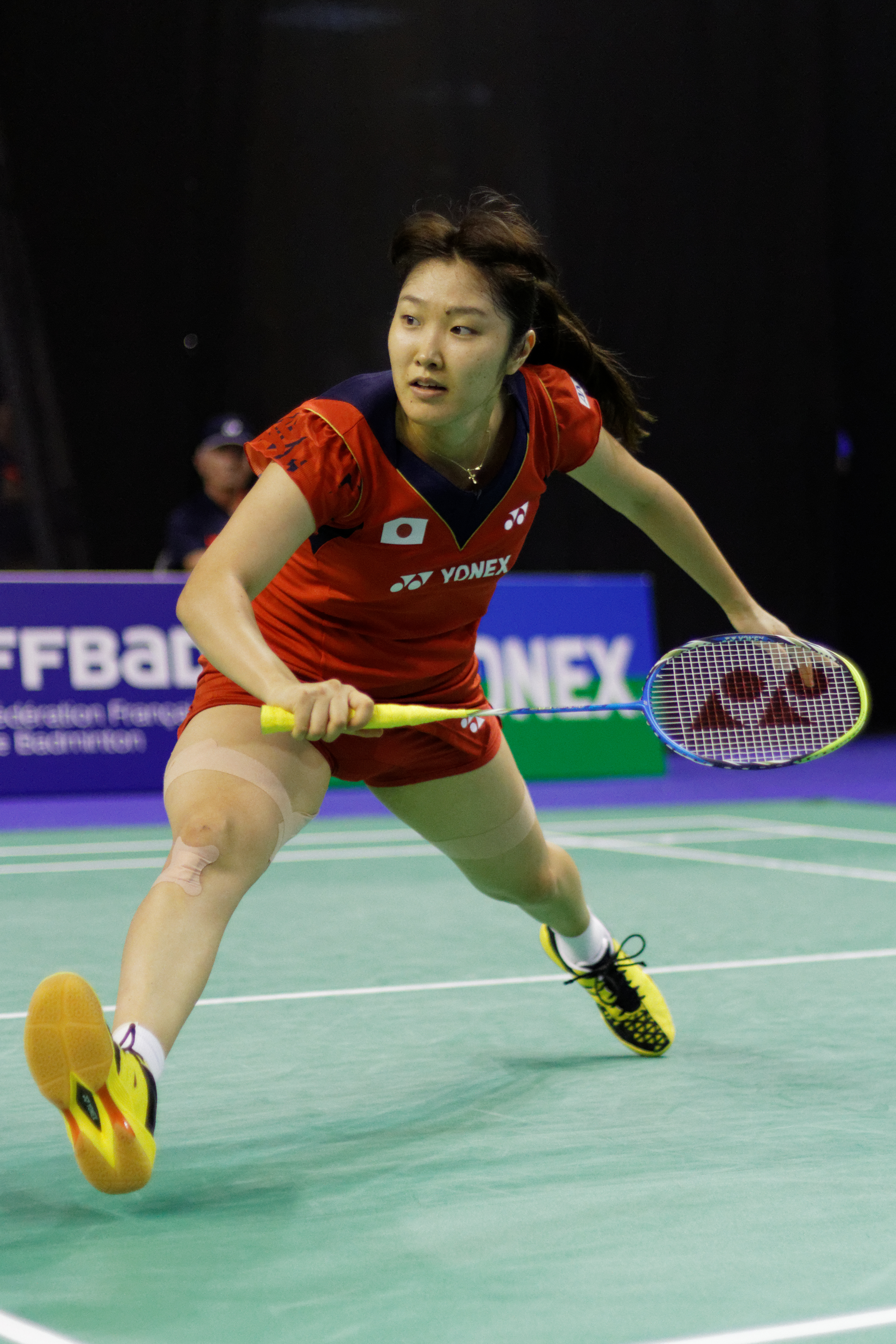
- Eriko Hirose at the 2013 French Super Series

Personal information
- Born: 16 March 1985 (age 41) Inagawa, Hyōgo, Japan
- Height: 1.63 m (5 ft 4 in)
- Weight: 54 kg (119 lb)

Sport
- Country: Japan
- Sport: Badminton
- Handedness: Right
- Retired: December 2014

Women's singles
- Highest ranking: 7 (23 September 2010)
- BWF profile
Medal record
Women's badminton
Representing Japan
Uber Cup
Silver medal – second place	2014 New Delhi	Women's team
Bronze medal – third place	2010 Kuala Lumpur	Women's team
Bronze medal – third place	2012 Wuhan	Women's team
Asian Games
Silver medal – second place	2006 Doha	Women's team
Bronze medal – third place	2010 Guangzhou	Women's singles
Asian Championships
Bronze medal – third place	2013 Taipei	Women's singles
Bronze medal – third place	2005 Hyderabad	Women's singles
Asian Junior Championships
Bronze medal – third place	2002 Kuala Lumpur	Girls' singles
Bronze medal – third place	2002 Kuala Lumpur	Girls' team

Eriko Hirose (廣瀬 栄理子, Hirose Eriko, born 16 March 1985) is a Japanese badminton coach and former player who specialized in women's singles. She achieved a career-high singles world ranking of No. 7 and represented Japan at the 2008 Summer Olympics in Beijing.

Hirose was the runner-up at the 2011 All England Open, becoming the first Japanese player to reach the women's singles final in 32 years. She won a women's singles bronze medal at the 2010 Asian Games in Guangzhou and two singles bronze medals at the Asian Championships. In team events, she was part of the Japanese women's team that won a silver medal at the 2006 Asian Games in Doha and three Uber Cup medals between 2010 and 2014.

Domestically, Hirose won the women's singles title at the All Japan Championships five times, including three consecutive titles from 2008 to 2010. She retired from competitive badminton in December 2014 and later became a coach, serving on the coaching staff of Japan's national B team.

== Career ==
Hirose began playing badminton in the first grade of elementary school and later attended Aomori Yamada High School. In 2002, she won bronze medals in both the girls' singles and girls' team events at the Asian Junior Championships in Kuala Lumpur. After graduating from high school, she joined Sanyo Electric in 2003. The following year, she reached the women's singles final at the Indonesia Open, where she finished runner-up to China's Xie Xingfang.

In 2005, Hirose competed at the World Championships in Anaheim, advancing to the third round before losing to Hong Kong's Wang Chen. Later that year, she won a bronze medal in women's singles at the Asian Championships in Hyderabad after losing to compatriot Kaori Mori in the semifinals. Hirose was part of the Japanese team that won the silver medal in the women's team event at the 2006 Asian Games in Doha. In 2007, she won the women's singles title at the inaugural Osaka International, defeating Kanako Yonekura in the final.

During the qualification period for the 2008 Summer Olympics, Hirose suffered a torn right hamstring at the 2007 Philippines Open, sidelining her for three months. After being told that surgery would rule out a timely return for the Olympics, she opted for non-surgical treatment. On her return, Hirose reached the quarterfinals of the Hong Kong Open in November 2007, defeating 2004 Olympic bronze medalist Zhou Mi in straight games in the second round, a victory she later described as a turning point in her qualification for Beijing.

Hirose represented Japan in the women's singles at the 2008 Summer Olympics in Beijing. She defeated Iceland's Ragna Ingólfsdóttir in the first round and Vietnam's Lê Ngọc Nguyên Nhung in the second round. Her run ended in the third round, where she lost in three games to fifth seed Pi Hongyan of France.

In May 2010, Hirose helped Japan win a bronze medal at the 2010 Uber Cup in Kuala Lumpur, where the team reached the semifinals before losing 1–3 to South Korea. At the 2010 World Championships in Paris, she advanced to the quarterfinals after upsetting top-seeded world No. 1 Wang Yihan in three games in the third round. She was eliminated in the quarterfinals by eventual champion Wang Lin. On 23 September 2010, Hirose reached a career-high women's singles world ranking of No. 7. Later that year, she won a bronze medal in women's singles at the Asian Games in Guangzhou after losing to world No. 1 Wang Xin in the semifinals.

In March 2011, Hirose reached the women's singles final at the All England Open, becoming the first Japanese woman to contest the singles final at the tournament since Saori Kondo in 1979. After defeating fifth seed Saina Nehwal in the quarterfinals and Petya Nedelcheva in the semifinals, she finished as runner-up to world No. 1 Wang Shixian. Her appearance in the final came two days after the 2011 Tōhoku earthquake and tsunami, with Hirose saying that she hoped her performance could bring encouragement to those affected in Japan. In April 2011, following Sanyo Electric's integration into Panasonic, the Sanyo Electric badminton team was renamed the Panasonic Badminton Team. In May 2012, she was part of the Japanese team that won a bronze medal at the 2012 Uber Cup in Wuhan. In September 2012, amid news that Panasonic's badminton team would be suspended at the end of the season, Hirose reached her first Japan Open final, where she finished runner-up to Tai Tzu-ying. The following month, she defeated Wang Shixian in three games at the French Open before reaching the semifinals, where she lost to eventual champion Minatsu Mitani.

In 2013, Hirose earned her second career women's singles bronze medal at the Asian Championships in Taipei, losing in the semifinals to Wang Yihan. She contributed to Japan's silver-medal finish at the 2014 Uber Cup in New Delhi, defeating P. C. Thulasi in Japan's semifinal victory over India. Domestically, Hirose won the women's singles title at the All Japan Championships five times, in 2004, 2006, 2008, 2009 and 2010, including three consecutive titles from 2008 to 2010.

Following the disbandment of Panasonic's badminton team, Hirose joined Yonex in 2013 under a professional contract. In December 2014, following a semifinal exit at the All Japan Championships, Hirose announced her retirement from competitive badminton at the age of 29, concluding a 23-year playing career. In January 2017, she joined the coaching staff of the Japan national team as a B-team coach.

== Achievements ==
=== Asian Games ===
Women's singles

Year	Venue	Opponent	Score	Result	Ref
2010	Tianhe Gymnasium, Guangzhou, China	(China) Wang Xin	7–21, 15–21	Bronze	

=== Asian Championships ===
Women's singles

Year	Venue	Opponent	Score	Result	Ref
2005	Gachibowli Indoor Stadium, Hyderabad, India	(Japan) Kaori Mori	5–11, 11–5, 10–13	Bronze	
2013	Taipei Arena, Taipei, Taiwan	(China) Wang Yihan	12–21, 6–21	Bronze	

=== Asian Junior Championships ===
Girls' singles

Year	Venue	Opponent	Score	Result	Ref
2002	Kuala Lumpur Badminton Stadium, Kuala Lumpur, Malaysia	(China) Zhu Lin	7–11, 4–11	Bronze	

=== BWF Superseries ===
The BWF Superseries, launched on 14 December 2006 and implemented in 2007, was a series of elite badminton tournaments, sanctioned by Badminton World Federation (BWF). BWF Superseries had two level such as Superseries and Superseries Premier. A season of Superseries featured twelve tournaments around the world, which introduced since 2011, with successful players invited to the Superseries Finals held at the year end.

Women's singles

Year	Tournament	Opponent	Score	Result	Ref
2011	All England Open	(China) Wang Shixian	22–24, 18–21	(silver) Runner-up	
2012	Japan Open	(Chinese Taipei) Tai Tzu-ying	21–9, 9–21, 14–21	(silver) Runner-up	

BWF Superseries Premier tournament
BWF Superseries tournament

=== IBF World Grand Prix ===
The World Badminton Grand Prix sanctioned by International Badminton Federation (IBF) since 1983.

Women's singles

Year	Tournament	Opponent	Score	Result	Ref
2004	Indonesia Open	(China) Xie Xingfang	8–11, 0–11	(silver) Runner-up	

=== BWF International Challenge/Series ===
Women's singles

Year	Tournament	Opponent	Score	Result	Ref
2007	Osaka International	(Japan) Kanako Yonekura	21–14, 21–11	(gold) Winner	

BWF International Challenge tournament

== Record against selected opponents ==
Record against year-end Finals finalists, World Championships semi-finalists, and Olympic quarter-finalists.

Player	M	W	L	Diff.
(Bulgaria) Petya Nedelcheva	7	6	1	+5
(China) Gong Ruina	1	1	0	+1
(China) Li Xuerui	5	0	5	–5
(China) Lu Lan	8	2	6	–4
(China) Wang Lin	4	2	2	0
(China) Wang Shixian	10	1	9	–8
(China) Wang Xin	5	0	5	–5
(China) Wang Yihan	9	1	8	–7
(China) Xie Xingfang	4	0	4	–4
(China) Zhang Ning	6	0	6	–6
(China) Zhu Lin	10	3	7	–4
(Chinese Taipei) Cheng Shao-chieh	4	2	2	0
(Chinese Taipei) Huang Chia-chi	1	1	0	+1
(Chinese Taipei) Tai Tzu-ying	6	3	3	0
(Denmark) Tine Baun	3	1	2	–1
(England) Tracey Hallam	2	2	0	+2
(France) Pi Hongyan	7	1	6	–5

Player	M	W	L	Diff.
(Germany) Juliane Schenk	10	4	6	–2
(Germany) Xu Huaiwen	4	1	3	–2
(Hong Kong) Wang Chen	4	1	3	–2
(Hong Kong) Yip Pui Yin	7	4	3	+1
(Hong Kong) / (China) Zhou Mi	6	2	4	–2
(India) Saina Nehwal	9	5	4	+1
(India) P. V. Sindhu	4	3	1	+2
(Indonesia) Lindaweni Fanetri	3	1	2	–1
(Indonesia) Maria Kristin Yulianti	3	2	1	+1
(Japan) Minatsu Mitani	3	1	2	–1
(Malaysia) Wong Mew Choo	8	3	5	–2
(South Korea) Bae Yeon-ju	6	4	2	+2
(South Korea) Sung Ji-hyun	7	0	7	–7
(Spain) Carolina Marín	2	1	1	0
(Thailand) Porntip Buranaprasertsuk	8	3	5	–2
(Thailand) Ratchanok Intanon	3	0	3	–3
