= Badminton at the 2006 Asian Games – Women's singles =

Women's singles at the 2006 Asian Games
- Venue: Aspire Hall 3
- Dates: 5–9 December
- Competitors: 26 from 14 nations

Medalists
gold medal	Wang Chen	Hong Kong
silver medal	Yip Pui Yin	Hong Kong
bronze medal	Hwang Hye-youn	South Korea
bronze medal	Xie Xingfang	China

The badminton women's singles tournament at the 2006 Asian Games in Doha took place from 5 December to 9 December at Aspire Hall 3.

== Schedule ==
All times are Arabia Standard Time (UTC+03:00)

Date	Time	Event
Tuesday, 5 December 2006	10:00	Round of 32
Wednesday, 6 December 2006	12:00	Round of 32
Wednesday, 6 December 2006	17:00	Round of 16
Thursday, 7 December 2006	18:30	Quarterfinals
Friday, 8 December 2006	20:00	Semifinals
Saturday, 9 December 2006	16:00	Final

== Results ==
Legend

- WO — Won by walkover

=== Final ===
Final
7	Yip Pui Yin (HKG)	14	20
3	Wang Chen (HKG)	21	22

=== Top half ===
Round of 32
Fransisca Ratnasari (INA)	21	21
Thilini Jayasinghe (SRI)	12	13
Nakisa Soltani (IRI)	2	13
Soratja Chansrisukot (THA)	21	21
Xing Aiying (SIN)	21	21
Sumina Shrestha (NEP)	1	6
8	Hwang Hye-youn (KOR)	21	21
Pai Min-jie (TPE)	8	11
Trupti Murgunde (IND)
Julia Wong (MAS)	W	O

Round of 16
1	Zhang Ning (CHN)	21	21
Fransisca Ratnasari (INA)	11	12
7	Yip Pui Yin (HKG)	23	21
Soratja Chansrisukot (THA)	21	10
4	Kaori Mori (JPN)	15	12
Xing Aiying (SIN)	21	21
8	Hwang Hye-youn (KOR)	21	21
Julia Wong (MAS)	16	9

Quarterfinals
1	Zhang Ning (CHN)	19	19
7	Yip Pui Yin (HKG)	21	21
Xing Aiying (SIN)	21	15	18
8	Hwang Hye-youn (KOR)	14	21	21

Semifinals
7	Yip Pui Yin (HKG)	21	21
8	Hwang Hye-youn (KOR)	14	19

=== Bottom half ===
Round of 32
Lee Yun-hwa (KOR)	21	21
Adriyanti Firdasari (INA)	19	14
Roula Matar (SYR)	5	2
6	Wong Mew Choo (MAS)	21	21
Cheng Shao-chieh (TPE)	11	21	15
Li Li (SIN)	21	18	21
Nadeesha Gayanthi (SRI)	10	6
Saina Nehwal (IND)	21	21
Salakjit Ponsana (THA)	21	21
Behnaz Pirzamanbin (IRI)	4	8

Round of 16
Lee Yun-hwa (KOR)	21	14	21
6	Wong Mew Choo (MAS)	12	21	12
Li Li (SIN)	13	20
3	Wang Chen (HKG)	21	22
Saina Nehwal (IND)	23	7
5	Eriko Hirose (JPN)	25	21
Salakjit Ponsana (THA)	15	6
2	Xie Xingfang (CHN)	21	21

Quarterfinals
Lee Yun-hwa (KOR)	21	8
3	Wang Chen (HKG)	23	21
5	Eriko Hirose (JPN)	7	24	16
2	Xie Xingfang (CHN)	21	22	21

Semifinals
3	Wang Chen (HKG)	21	17	21
2	Xie Xingfang (CHN)	17	21	16
