= 1999 European Junior Badminton Championships =

Tournament details
- Dates: 3 April – 10 April
- Edition: 16th
- Location: Kelvin Hall, Glasgow, Scotland

The 1999 European Junior Badminton Championships were the 16th tournament of the European Junior Badminton Championships. It was held in Kelvin Hall, Glasgow, Scotland, from 3–10 April 1999. German players won both the singles events and Girls' doubles title, while Danish players grabbed titles in Boys' doubles and Mixed doubles. Germany also won the mixed team title.

== Medalists ==
Event	Gold	Silver	Bronze
Boys' singles	(Germany) Björn Joppien	(Netherlands) Eric Pang	(Poland) Przemysław Wacha
Boys' singles	(Germany) Björn Joppien	(Netherlands) Eric Pang	(England) Ben Hume
Girls' singles	(Germany) Petra Overzier	(Russia) Victoria Kosheleva	(Poland) Kamila Augustyn
Girls' singles	(Germany) Petra Overzier	(Russia) Victoria Kosheleva	(Germany) Anne Hönscheid
Boys' doubles	(Denmark) Mathias Boe (Denmark) Kasper Kiim Jensen	(Poland) Przemysław Wacha (Poland) Piotr Żołądek	(England) Kristian Roebuck (England) Oliver Bush
Boys' doubles	(Denmark) Mathias Boe (Denmark) Kasper Kiim Jensen	(Poland) Przemysław Wacha (Poland) Piotr Żołądek	(France) Jean-Michel Lefort (France) Olivier Fossy
Girls' doubles	(Germany) Petra Overzier (Germany) Anne Hönscheid	(Denmark) Helle Nielsen (Denmark) Karina Sørensen	(Scotland) Fiona Sneddon (Scotland) Carol Tedman
Girls' doubles	(Germany) Petra Overzier (Germany) Anne Hönscheid	(Denmark) Helle Nielsen (Denmark) Karina Sørensen	(England) Liza Parker (England) Suzanne Rayappan
Mixed doubles	(Denmark) Mathias Boe (Denmark) Karina Sørensen	(Germany) Sebastian Schmidt (Germany) Anne Hönscheid	(Russia) Alexey Vasiliev (Russia) Anastasia Russkikh
Mixed doubles	(Denmark) Mathias Boe (Denmark) Karina Sørensen	(Germany) Sebastian Schmidt (Germany) Anne Hönscheid	(Denmark) Jonas Glyager Jensen (Denmark) Helle Nielsen
Mixed team	Germany; Jochen Cassel; Raphael Groß; Björn Joppien; Jan Junker; Sebastian Schmidt; Corinna Herrle; Anne Hönscheid; Carina Mette; Kathrin Piotrowski; Petra Overzier; Juliane Schenk	Russia; Evgenij Dremin; Aleksandr Nikolaenko; Alexey Vasiliev; Anna Efremova; Maria Koloskova; Victoria Kosheleva; Anastasia Russkikh	Denmark; Mathias Boe; Jonas Glyager Jensen; Kasper Kiim Jensen; Jonas Lyduch; Thomas Råhlin; Tine Høy; Helle Nielsen; Anne Marie Pedersen; Karina Sørensen

== Results ==
=== Semi-finals ===
Category	Winner	Runner-up	Score
Boys' singles	(Germany) Björn Joppien	(Poland) Przemysław Wacha	15–3, 17–16
Boys' singles	(Netherlands) Eric Pang	(England) Ben Hume	15–8, 15–8
Women's singles	(Germany) Petra Overzier	(Poland) Kamila Augustyn	11–1, 11–2
Women's singles	(Russia) Victoria Kosheleva	(Germany) Anne Hönscheid	13–10, 11–6
Boys' doubles	(Denmark) Mathias Boe (Denmark) Kasper Kiim Jensen	(England) Kristian Roebuck (England) Oliver Bush	12–15, 15–1, 15–10
Boys' doubles	(Poland) Piotr Żołądek (Poland) Przemysław Wacha	(France) Jean-Michel Lefort (France) Olivier Fossy	0–15, 17–14, 17–15
Girls' doubles	(Denmark) Helle Nielsen (Denmark) Karina Sørensen	(England) Liza Parker (England) Suzanne Rayappan	15–9, 15–7
Girls' doubles	(Germany) Anne Hönscheid (Germany) Petra Overzier	(Scotland) Carol Tedman (Scotland) Fiona Sneddon	15–3, 15–8
Mixed doubles	(Germany) Sebastian Schmidt (Germany) Anne Hönscheid	(Denmark) Jonas Glyager Jensen (Denmark) Helle Nielsen	9–15, 15–10, 15–6
Mixed doubles	(Denmark) Mathias Boe (Denmark) Karina Sørensen	(Russia) Alexei Vasiliev (Russia) Anastasia Russkikh	15–4, 15–9

=== Finals ===
Category	Winners	Runners-up	Score
Boys' singles	(Germany) Björn Joppien	(Netherlands) Eric Pang	15–8, 15–10
Girls' singles	(Germany) Petra Overzier	(Russia) Victoria Kosheleva	5–11, 11–4, 11–2
Boys' doubles	(Denmark) Kasper Kiim Jensen (Denmark) Mathias Boe	(Poland) Przemysław Wacha (Poland) Piotr Żołądek	15–3, 15–8
Girls' doubles	(Germany) Anne Hönscheid (Germany) Petra Overzier	(Denmark) Helle Nielsen (Denmark) Karina Sørensen	15–2, 8–15, 15–9
Mixed doubles	(Denmark) Mathias Boe (Denmark) Karina Sørensen	(Germany) Sebastian Schmidt (Germany) Anne Hönscheid	15–5, 15–4

== Medal table ==
Rank	Nation	Gold	Silver	Bronze	Total
1	Germany (GER)	4	1	1	6
2	Denmark (DEN)	2	1	2	5
3	Russia (RUS)	0	2	1	3
4	Poland (POL)	0	1	2	3
5	Netherlands (NED)	0	1	0	1
6	England (ENG)	0	0	3	3
7	France	0	0	1	1
7	Scotland (SCO)	0	0	1	1
Totals (8 entries)		6	6	11	23
