= Xie Xingfang =

Chinese badminton player

Xie Xingfang 谢杏芳
Personal information
- Born: September 8, 1981 (age 45) Guangzhou, Guangdong, China
- Height: 1.78 m (5 ft 10 in)
- Weight: 60 kg (132 lb; 9 st 6 lb)
- Spouse: Lin Dan (m. 2010)

Sport
- Country: China
- Sport: Badminton
- Handedness: Right

Women's singles
- Highest ranking: 1
- BWF profile
Medal record
Women's badminton
Representing China
Olympic Games
Silver medal – second place	2008 Beijing	Women's singles
World Championships
Gold medal – first place	2005 Anaheim	Women's singles
Gold medal – first place	2006 Madrid	Women's singles
Silver medal – second place	2009 Hyderabad	Women's singles
World Cup
Gold medal – first place	2005 Yiyang	Women's singles
Silver medal – second place	2006 Yiyang	Women's singles
Sudirman Cup
Gold medal – first place	2005 Beijing	Mixed team
Gold medal – first place	2007 Glasgow	Mixed team
Gold medal – first place	2009 Guangzhou	Mixed team
Uber Cup
Gold medal – first place	2004 Jakarta	Women's team
Gold medal – first place	2006 Sendai/Tokyo	Women's team
Gold medal – first place	2008 Jakarta	Women's team
Asian Games
Gold medal – first place	2006 Doha	Women's team
Bronze medal – third place	2006 Doha	Women's singles
Asian Championships
Gold medal – first place	2000 Jakarta	Women's singles
Silver medal – second place	2009 Suwon	Women's singles
World Junior Championships
Gold medal – first place	1998 Melbourne	Girls' doubles
Bronze medal – third place	1998 Melbourne	Mixed doubles
Asian Junior Championships
Gold medal – first place	1999 Yangon	Girls' doubles
Gold medal – first place	1999 Yangon	Girls' team
Gold medal – first place	1998 Kuala Lumpur	Girls' team
Bronze medal – third place	1998 Kuala Lumpur	Girls' doubles

Xie Xingfang
- Traditional Chinese: 謝杏芳
- Simplified Chinese: 谢杏芳
Transcriptions
Standard Mandarin
- Hanyu Pinyin: Xiè Xìngfāng
Yue: Cantonese
- Yale Romanization: Che6 Hang6 Fong1

Xie Xingfang (born September 8, 1981) is a retired Chinese badminton player from Guangzhou, Guangdong. She is a former two-time world champion for women's singles, and former women's singles World No. 1.

Her first big title was in girls' doubles, with her provincial teammate Zhang Jiewen, at the World Junior Championships in 1998. She has also won a bronze medal at the World Junior Championships in mixed doubles with Cai Yun. However, once she entered the Chinese national team, she switched to singles. 2004 was her "break-out" year, as she won several top tier titles on the world circuit. Xie and her senior compatriot and rival Zhang Ning were the most dominant international women's singles players of the middle and late parts of the decade, though they were pressed by younger teammates such as Zhu Lin, Lu Lan, Jiang Yanjiao and Wang Yihan. Due to her height and slender figure, she is regarded to have elegant movement. Xie's strengths were her reach, quickness, consistency, and court sense. She was a member of China's world champion Uber Cup teams of 2004, 2006, and 2008.

Her last appearance as a player in a major badminton competition came at the National Games of China in October 2009.

During most of her badminton career Xie was romantically involved with fellow Chinese badminton star Lin Dan. In 2006 Xie and Lin won their respective women's and men's singles titles at the IBF World Championships in Madrid. Xie had also won the world title in 2005 when Lin finished second to Indonesia's Taufik Hidayat. Xie Xingfang and Lin Dan were married in Guangzhou, China, on 13 December 2010, after seven years of dating. She is also a mother of a son, Lin Xiao Yu, who was born on 5 November 2016.

== Achievements ==
=== Olympic Games ===
Women's singles
Year	Venue	Opponent	Score	Result
2008	Beijing University of Technology Gymnasium; Beijing, China	(China) Zhang Ning	12–21, 21–10, 18–21	Silver

=== World Championships ===
Women's singles
Year	Venue	Opponent	Score	Result
2009	Gachibowli Indoor Stadium; Hyderabad, India	(China) Lu Lan	21–23, 12–21	Silver
2006	Palacio de Deportes de la Comunidad; Madrid, Spain	(China) Zhang Ning	21–16, 21–14	Gold
2005	Arrowhead Pond; Anaheim, United States	(China) Zhang Ning	11–8, 9–11, 11–3	Gold

=== World Cup ===
Women's singles
Year	Venue	Opponent	Score	Result
2006	Olympic Park; Yiyang, China	(China) Wang Yihan	18–21, 19–21	Silver
2005	Olympic Park; Yiyang, China	(China) Zhang Ning	21–19, 21–16	Gold

=== Asian Games ===
Women's singles
Year	Venue	Opponent	Score	Result
2006	Aspire Hall 3 Doha, Qatar	(Hong Kong) Wang Chen	17–21, 21–17, 16–21	Bronze

=== Asian Championships ===
Women's singles
Year	Venue	Opponent	Score	Result
2009	Suwon Indoor Stadium; Suwon, South Korea	(China) Zhu Lin	11–21, 10–21	Silver
2000	Istora Senayan; Jakarta, Indonesia	(Indonesia) Ellen Angelina	2–11, 11–7, 11–3	Gold

=== World Junior Championships ===
Girls' doubles
Year	Venue	Partner	Opponent	Score	Result
1998	Sports and Aquatic Centre; Melbourne, Australia	(China) Zhang Jiewen	(China) Gong Ruina (China) Huang Sui	3–15, 15–13, 15–10	Gold

Mixed doubles
Year	Venue	Partner	Opponent	Score	Result
1998	Sports and Aquatic Centre; Melbourne, Australia	(China) Cai Yun	(Malaysia) Chan Chong Ming (Malaysia) Joanne Quay	4–15, 3–15	Bronze

=== Asian Junior Championships ===
Girls' doubles
Year	Venue	Partner	Opponent	Score	Result
1999	National Indoor Stadium – 1 Yangon, Myanmar	(China) Zhang Jiewen	(China) Li Yujia (China) Wei Yili	15–9, 15–6	Gold
1998	Kuala Lumpur Badminton Stadium; Kuala Lumpur, Malaysia	(China) Dong Fang	(South Korea) Jun Woul-sik (South Korea) Lee Hyo-jung	3–15, 8–15	Bronze

=== BWF Superseries ===
The BWF Superseries, launched on 14 December 2006 and implemented in 2007, is a series of elite badminton tournaments, sanctioned by Badminton World Federation (BWF). BWF Superseries has two levels: Superseries and Superseries Premier. A season of Superseries features twelve tournaments around the world, which introduced since 2011, with successful players invited to the Superseries Finals held at the year end.

Women's singles
Year	Tournament	Opponent	Score	Result
2009	Singapore Open	(Hong Kong) Zhou Mi	19–21, 21–18, 10–21	(silver) Runner-up
2008	Hong Kong Open	(Hong Kong) Wang Chen	16–21, 21–10, 10–21	(silver) Runner-up
2008	French Open	(China) Wang Lin	18–21, 21–13, 11–21	(silver) Runner-up
2008	Swiss Open	(China) Zhang Ning	21–18, 21–17	(gold) Winner
2007	Hongkong Open	(China) Zhu Lin	21–19, 21–14	(gold) Winner
2007	China Open	(Malaysia) Wong Mew Choo	16–21, 21–8, 17–21	(silver) Runner-up
2007	French Open	(France) Pi Hongyan	21–13, 21–13	(gold) Winner
2007	Japan Open	(Denmark) Tine Rasmussen	15–21, 17–21	(silver) Runner-up
2007	China Masters	(China) Zhang Ning	21–11, 8–21, 23–21	(gold) Winner
2007	Singapore Open	(China) Zhang Ning	18–21, 21–19, 3–21	(silver) Runner-up
2007	All England Open	(France) Pi Hongyan	21–6, 21–13	(gold) Winner
2007	Korea Open	(China) Zhu Lin	21–14, 21–7	(gold) Winner

BWF Super Series Finals tournament
BWF Super Series Premier tournament
BWF Super Series tournament

=== BWF Grand Prix ===
The BWF Grand Prix has two levels, the BWF Grand Prix and Grand Prix Gold. It is a series of badminton tournaments sanctioned by the Badminton World Federation (BWF) since 2007. The World Badminton Grand Prix has been sanctioned by the International Badminton Federation since 1983.

Women's singles
Year	Tournament	Opponent	Score	Result
2008	Thailand Open	(China) Lu Lan	26–24, 21–7	(gold) Winner
2007	Macau Open	(South Korea) Jun Jae-youn	21–10, 21–10	(gold) Winner
2007	German Open	(Germany) Huaiwen Xu	19–21, 21–12, 21–19	(gold) Winner
2006	Japan Open	(China) Zhang Ning	11–21, 21–16, 29–30	(silver) Runner-up
2006	Hongkong Open	(China) Zhang Ning	Walkover	(gold) Winner
2006	Chinese Taipei Open	(China) Zhang Ning	15–21, 15–21	(silver) Runner-up
2006	China Masters	(China) Wang Lin	21–15, 13–21, 15–21	(silver) Runner-up
2006	All England Open	(China) Zhang Ning	11–6, 4–11, 11–2	(gold) Winner
2005	China Open	(China) Zhang Ning	11–3, 4–11, 8–11	(silver) Runner-up
2005	Hongkong Open	(China) Zhang Ning	4–11, 11–1, 6–11	(silver) Runner-up
2005	Japan Open	(China) Zhang Ning	7–11, 8–11	(silver) Runner-up
2005	All England Open	(China) Zhang Ning	11–3, 11–9	(gold) Winner
2005	German Open	(China) Zhang Ning	11–5, 11–4	(gold) Winner
2004	Indonesia Open	(Japan) Eriko Hirose	11–8, 11–0	(gold) Winner
2004	China Open	(Hong Kong) Wang Chen	5–11, 11–3, 11–4	(gold) Winner
2004	German Open	(Germany) Xu Huaiwen	9–11, 11–6, 11–7	(gold) Winner
2004	Denmark Open	(Netherlands) Yao Jie	11–9, 8–11, 11–7	(gold) Winner
2003	Indonesia Open	(Hong Kong) Wang Chen	11–6, 8–11, 11–1	(gold) Winner
2003	Japan Open	(Denmark) Camilla Martin	1–11, 5–11	(silver) Runner-up
2003	All England Open	(China) Zhou Mi	6–11, 5–11	(silver) Runner-up
1999	Hong Kong Open	(Hong Kong) Ling Wan Ting	7–11, 11–7, 11–4	(gold) Winner

BWF Grand Prix Gold tournament
BWF Grand Prix tournament

=== IBF International ===
Women's singles
Year	Tournament	Opponent	Score	Result
2002	French International	(China) Wang Rong	7–3, 7–2, 7–1	(gold) Winner

== Record against selected opponents ==
Record against year-end Finals finalists, World Championships semi-finalists, and Olympic quarter-finalists.

Players	Matches	Results		Difference
Players	Matches	Won	Lost	Difference
(Australia) / (Chinese Taipei) Huang Chia-chi	2	2	0	+2
(Bulgaria) Petya Nedelcheva	3	3	0	+3
(China) Dai Yun	3	1	2	–1
(China) Gong Ruina	6	3	3	0
(China) Gong Zhichao	1	0	1	–1
(China) Lu Lan	12	9	3	+6
(China) Wang Lin	5	2	3	–1
(China) Wang Yihan	5	3	2	+1
(China) Zhang Ning	23	11	12	–1
(China) Zhu Lin	6	5	1	+4
(Chinese Taipei) Cheng Shao-chieh	5	3	2	+1
(Denmark) Tine Baun	12	11	1	+10
(Denmark) Camilla Martin	5	2	3	–1
(England) Tracey Hallam	9	8	1	+7

Players	Matches	Results		Difference
Players	Matches	Won	Lost	Difference
(France) Pi Hongyan	10	9	1	+8
(Germany) Petra Overzier	2	2	0	+2
(Germany) Juliane Schenk	4	4	0	+4
(Germany) Xu Huaiwen	9	9	0	+9
(Hong Kong) / (China) Wang Chen	9	7	2	+5
(Hong Kong) Yip Pui Yin	4	3	1	+2
(Hong Kong) / (China) Zhou Mi	12	3	9	–6
(India) Saina Nehwal	2	2	0	+2
(Indonesia) Maria Kristin Yulianti	2	2	0	+2
(Malaysia) Wong Mew Choo	8	6	2	+4
(Netherlands) / (Indonesia) Mia Audina	6	6	0	+6
(South Korea) Bae Yeon-ju	1	1	0	+1
(South Korea) Kim Ji-hyun	1	0	1	–1
