= 2004 Indonesia Open (badminton) =

Tournament details
- Dates: 13 December 2004 – 19 December 2004
- Edition: 23rd
- Level: World Grand Prix 6 Stars
- Total prize money: US$250,000
- Venue: Tennis Indoor Senayan
- Location: Jakarta, Indonesia

Champions
- Men's singles: (Indonesia) Taufik Hidayat
- Women's singles: (China) Xie Xingfang
- Men's doubles: (Indonesia) Luluk Hadiyanto (Indonesia) Alvent Yulianto
- Women's doubles: (China) Yang Wei (China) Zhang Jiewen
- Mixed doubles: (China) Zhang Jun (China) Gao Ling

The 2004 Indonesia Open (officially known as the Djarum Indonesia Open 2004 for sponsorship reasons) was a six-star World Grand Prix badminton tournament that was held in Jakarta, from December 13 to December 19, 2004, with a total prize money of US$250,000. It was the 23rd edition of the Indonesia Open.

== Final results ==
Category	Winners	Runners-up	Score
Men's singles	(Indonesia) Taufik Hidayat	(China) Chen Hong	15–10, 15–11
Women's singles	(China) Xie Xingfang	(Japan) Eriko Hirose	11–8, 11–0
Men's doubles	(Indonesia) Luluk Hadiyanto & Alvent Yulianto	(China) Fu Haifeng & Cai Yun	15–8, 15–11
Women's doubles	(China) Yang Wei & Zhang Jiewen	(China) Zhang Dan & Zhang Yawen	15-10, 15-5
Mixed doubles	(China) Zhang Jun & Gao Ling	(England) Robert Blair & Natalie Munt	15–9, 15–9
