= Petra Overzier =

German badminton player (born 1982)

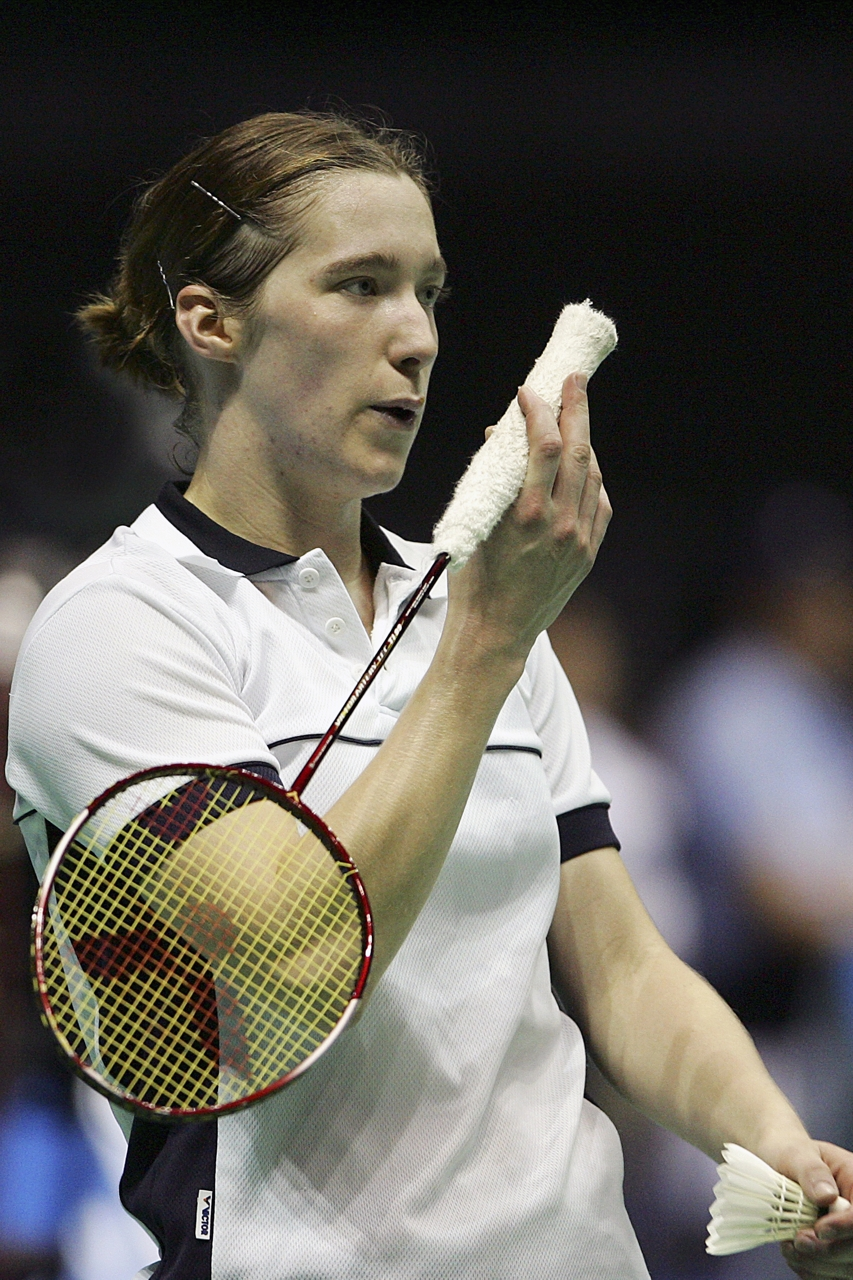

Personal information
- Born: 8 March 1982 (age 44) Cologne, Germany
- Height: 173 cm (5 ft 8 in)

Sport
- Country: Germany
- Sport: Badminton
- Handedness: Right
- Event: Women's singles

Women's singles
- BWF profile
Medal record
Women's badminton
Representing Germany
World Championships
Bronze medal – third place	2006 Madrid	Women's singles
Uber Cup
Bronze medal – third place	2006 Sendai & Tokyo	Women's team
European Women's Team Championships
Bronze medal – third place	2006 Thessalonica	Women's team
Bronze medal – third place	2008 Almere	Women's team
European Junior Championships
Gold medal – first place	1999 Glasgow	Girls' singles
Gold medal – first place	1999 Glasgow	Girls' doubles
Gold medal – first place	1999 Glasgow	Mixed team
Gold medal – first place	2001 Spała	Mixed team
Bronze medal – third place	2001 Spała	Girls' singles

Petra Overzier (born 8 March 1982) is a German badminton player. She is the first player originally from Germany to medal at the World Championships in the women's singles category in 2006. Her younger sister Birgit Overzier is also a professional badminton player.

== Achievements ==
=== World Championships ===
Women's singles
Year	Venue	Opponent	Score	Result
2006	Palacio de Deportes de la Comunidad de Madrid; Madrid, Spain	(China) Zhang Ning	19–21, 11–21	Bronze

=== European Junior Championships ===
Girls' singles
Year	Venue	Opponent	Score	Result
1999	Kelvin Hall; Glasgow, Scotland	(Russia) Victoria Kosheleva	5–11, 11–4, 11–2	Gold
2001	Sports Hall; Spała, Poland	(Poland) Kamila Augustyn	11–4, 5–11, 2–11	Bronze

Girls' doubles
Year	Venue	Partner	Opponent	Score	Result
1999	Kelvin Hall; Glasgow, Scotland	(Germany) Anne Hönscheid	(Denmark) Karina Sørensen (Denmark) Helle Nielsen	15–2, 8–15, 15–9	Gold

=== IBF/BWF International ===
Women's singles
Year	Venue	Opponent	Score	Result
2002	Canadian International	(England) Julia Mann	3–11, 11–5, 13–10	(gold) Winner
2003	Spanish International	(Germany) Xu Huaiwen	4–11, 5–11	(silver) Runner-up
2004	Norwegian International	(Scotland) Yuan Wemyss	11–1, 11–6	(gold) Winner
2004	Bitburger Open	(Germany) Xu Huaiwen	4–11, 2–11	(silver) Runner-up
2004	Dutch International	(Sweden) Sara Persson	11–8, 11–6	(gold) Winner
2005	Australian International	(Chinese Taipei) Huang Chia-chi	11–4, 11–4	(gold) Winner
2005	Norwegian International	(Germany) Juliane Schenk	6–11, 11–13	(silver) Runner-up
2005	Norwegian International	(Germany) Juliane Schenk	6–11, 11–13	(silver) Runner-up
2006	Dutch International	(Germany) Juliane Schenk	18–21, 21–19, 21–18	(gold) Winner
2006	Finnish International	(Sweden) Sara Persson	24–22, 21–15	(gold) Winner
2006	Spanish International	(Netherlands) Judith Meulendijks	21–18, 21–11	(gold) Winner
2006	Belgian International	(Russia) Ella Karachkova	21–16, 21–16	(gold) Winner
2006	Swedish International	(Denmark) Tine Rasmussen	18–21, 16–21	(silver) Runner-up

Women's doubles
Year	Tournament	Partner	Opponent	Score	Result
2000	Czech International	(Germany) Kathrin Piotrowski	(Denmark) Britta Andersen (Denmark) Lene Mørk	14–17, 8–15	(silver) Runner-up

== Record against selected opponents ==
Record against Year-end Finals finalists, World Championships semi-finalists, and Olympic quarter-finalists.

Players	Matches	Results		Difference
Players	Matches	Won	Lost	Difference
(China) Gong Ruina	3	0	3	–3
(China) Xie Xingfang	2	0	2	–2
(China) Zhang Ning	2	0	2	–2
(China) Zhu Lin	1	0	1	–1
(Chinese Taipei) Cheng Shao-chieh	1	1	0	+1
(Chinese Taipei) Huang Chia-chi	1	1	0	+1
(Denmark) Tine Baun	2	0	2	–2
(Denmark) Camilla Martin	2	0	2	–2

Players	Matches	Results		Difference
Players	Matches	Won	Lost	Difference
(England) Tracey Hallam	2	1	1	0
(Germany) Juliane Schenk	2	0	2	–2
(Germany) Xu Huaiwen	4	0	4	–4
(France) Pi Hongyan	2	0	2	–2
(Hong Kong) Wang Chen	2	1	1	0
(Malaysia) Wong Mew Choo	1	0	1	–1
(Netherlands) Mia Audina	5	0	5	–5
