= Sara Persson =

Swedish badminton player (born 1980)

Personal information
- Born: Sara Lisa Sofia Persson; 23 September 1980 (age 46) Danderyd, Stockholm, Sweden
- Height: 1.74 m (5 ft 9 in)
- Weight: 64 kg (141 lb)

Sport
- Country: Sweden
- Sport: Badminton
- Handedness: Right
- Event: Women's singles

Women's singles
- BWF profile

Sara Lisa Sofia Persson (born 23 September 1980) is a Swedish badminton player. Persson won the women's singles title at the Swedish National Championships in 2002 representing Täby Badmintonförening (now Göteborgs BK), and repeating it consecutively from 2005 to 2008. She competed at the Beijing 2008 Olympic Games, but defeated in the first round to Petya Nedelcheva of Bulgaria with the score 10–21, 10–21. Her sister, Johanna Persson, is also an Olympian who competed at the 2004 Summer Olympics in Athens, Greece.

== Achievements ==
=== BWF International Challenge/Series ===
Women's singles
Year	Tournament	Opponent	Score	Result
2008	Finnish International	(England) Elizabeth Cann	12–21, 17–21	(silver) Runner-up
2007	Italian International	(Germany) Juliane Schenk	16–21, 6–21	(silver) Runner-up
2006	Italian International	(Russia) Ella Karachkova	21–12, 21–11	(gold) Winner
2006	Irish International	(Scotland) Susan Hughes	21–19, 21–16	(gold) Winner
2006	Norwegian International	(Denmark) Anne Marie Pedersen	19–21, 21–18, 21–9	(gold) Winner
2006	Austrian International	(Germany) Juliane Schenk	19–21, 13–21	(silver) Runner-up
2005	Iceland International	(England) Julia Mann	13–11, 7–0 Retired	(gold) Winner
2005	Swedish International	(England) Elizabeth Cann	9–11, 2–11	(silver) Runner-up
2004	Le Volant d'Or de Toulouse	(Russia) Ella Karachkova	11–7, 10–13, 3–11	(silver) Runner-up
2004	Dutch International	(Germany) Petra Overzier	8–11, 6–11	(silver) Runner-up
2002	Czech International	(England) Jill Pittard	11–2, 11–5	(gold) Winner
2002	Spanish International	(Spain) Dolores Marco	7–3, 7–2, 7–3	(gold) Winner
2002	Austrian International	(Russia) Elena Sukhareva	7–5, 8–6, 7–4	(gold) Winner
2001	Welsh International	(Netherlands) Brenda Beenhakker	5–7, 5–7, 0–7	(silver) Runner-up

BWF International Challenge tournament
BWF International Series tournament
