= 2006 IBF World Championships =

Tournament details
- Dates: 18–24 September
- Edition: 15th
- Level: International
- Venue: Palacio de Deportes de la Comunidad de Madrid
- Location: Madrid, Spain

The 2006 IBF World Championships, the 15th tournament of the World Badminton Championships, was held in Madrid, the capital of Spain, from September 18 to 24, 2006.

== Host city selection ==
Aarhus (Denmark) and Madrid (Spain) were the candidates for hosting the championships. During the 2004 IBF council meeting held in Jakarta, it was announced that Madrid will host the championships.

== Venue ==
- Palacio de Deportes de la Comunidad de Madrid

== Medalists ==
=== Medal table ===
* Host nation (Spain)

Rank	Nation	Gold	Silver	Bronze	Total
1	China	4	3	3	10
2	England	1	2	0	3
3	Denmark	0	0	2	2
3	Germany	0	0	2	2
5	Malaysia	0	0	1	1
5	South Korea	0	0	1	1
5	Thailand	0	0	1	1
Totals (7 entries)		5	5	10	20

=== Events ===
Event	Gold	Silver	Bronze
Men's singles	(China) Lin Dan	(China) Bao Chunlai	(China) Chen Hong
Men's singles	(China) Lin Dan	(China) Bao Chunlai	(South Korea) Lee Hyun-il
Women's singles	(China) Xie Xingfang	(China) Zhang Ning	(Germany) Xu Huaiwen
Women's singles	(China) Xie Xingfang	(China) Zhang Ning	(Germany) Petra Overzier
Men's doubles	(China) Fu Haifeng (China) Cai Yun	(England) Anthony Clark (England) Robert Blair	(Denmark) Jens Eriksen (Denmark) Martin Lundgaard Hansen
Men's doubles	(China) Fu Haifeng (China) Cai Yun	(England) Anthony Clark (England) Robert Blair	(Denmark) Lars Paaske (Denmark) Jonas Rasmussen
Women's doubles	(China) Gao Ling (China) Huang Sui	(China) Zhang Yawen (China) Wei Yili	(China) Yang Wei (China) Zhang Jiewen
Women's doubles	(China) Gao Ling (China) Huang Sui	(China) Zhang Yawen (China) Wei Yili	(China) Du Jing (China) Yu Yang
Mixed doubles	(England) Nathan Robertson (England) Gail Emms	(England) Anthony Clark (England) Donna Kellogg	(Malaysia) Koo Kien Keat (Malaysia) Wong Pei Tty
Mixed doubles	(England) Nathan Robertson (England) Gail Emms	(England) Anthony Clark (England) Donna Kellogg	(Thailand) Sudket Prapakamol (Thailand) Saralee Thungthongkam
