= Huaiwen Xu =

Chinese-born German badminton player

Huaiwen Xu 徐怀雯
Personal information
- Born: 2 August 1975 (age 51) Guiyang, Guizhou, China
- Height: 160 cm (5 ft 3 in)

Sport
- Country: Germany
- Sport: Badminton
- Handedness: Right
- Event: Women's singles
Medal record
Women's badminton
Representing Germany
World Championships
Bronze medal – third place	2005 Anaheim	Women's singles
Bronze medal – third place	2006 Madrid	Women's singles
Uber Cup
Bronze medal – third place	2008 Jakarta	Women's team
European Championships
Gold medal – first place	2006 Den Bosch	Women's singles
Gold medal – first place	2008 Herning	Women's singles
European Women's Team Championships
Bronze medal – third place	2008 Almere	Women's team
Bronze medal – third place	2006 Thessalonica	Women's team

Huaiwen Xu (simplified Chinese: 徐怀雯; traditional Chinese: 徐懷雯; pinyin: Xú Huáiwén; born 2 August 1975) is a German badminton player. Born in Guiyang, Guizhou, China, she decided to play for Germany because the Chinese thought that she was too short to play professional world badminton.

== Career ==
Xu was among the most successful of a number of Chinese-born female players who emigrated from their badminton-rich homeland, in part, for a better opportunity to play in the world's biggest events. Beginning in 2003 when she won a spate of middle tier open tournaments in Europe, Xu went on to become one of the more consistent performers on the international circuit. She was a women's singles bronze medalist twice at the BWF World Championships (2005 and 2006) and won European Championships in 2006 and 2008 over Mia Audina and Tine Rasmussen respectively in the finals. At the 2008 Beijing Olympics Xu was eliminated in a close quarterfinal match by China's Xie Xingfang, the world's number one ranked player.

Among Xu's more than twenty national and international singles titles are the Scottish (2003), Polish (2003), Dutch (2005), and Swiss (2006) Opens, the Copenhagen Masters (2007), and five consecutive (2004–2008) German National Championships. Notably, she earned all of these titles after turning 27, an age at which world level singles players often feel that their best years are behind them.

Xu retired from playing on the international circuit in 2009 and worked as a coach for two years at the Bellevue Badminton Club near Seattle, teaching the Junior National team of young badminton players hoping to succeed in professional badminton. In 2010, she was appointed as an International Olympic Committee athlete role model for the 2010 Summer Youth Olympics. From 2011 to 2012, she served the Dutch Badminton Association as their National Coach.

== Personal life ==
Xu speaks fluent Chinese, German and English. She is married to Matthew Curtain, the CEO of British Weightlifting. The couple lives in the United Kingdom and has a daughter.

== Achievements ==
=== World Championships ===
Women's singles
Year	Venue	Opponent	Score	Result
2005	Arrowhead Pond; Anaheim, United States	(China) Zhang Ning	7–11, 9–11	Bronze
2006	Palacio de Deportes de la Comunidad de Madrid; Madrid, Spain	(China) Xie Xingfang	12–21, 10–21	Bronze

=== European Championships ===
Women's singles
Year	Venue	Opponent	Score	Result
2006	Maaspoort Sports and Events; Den Bosch, Netherlands	(Netherlands) Mia Audina	15–21, 21–9, 21–16	Gold
2008	Messecenter Herning; Herning, Denmark	(Denmark) Tine Rasmussen	12–21, 21–12, 21–17	Gold

=== BWF Grand Prix ===
The BWF Grand Prix had two levels, the Grand Prix and Grand Prix Gold. It was a series of badminton tournaments sanctioned by the Badminton World Federation (BWF) and played between 2007 and 2017. The World Badminton Grand Prix was sanctioned by the International Badminton Federation from 1983 to 2006.

Women's singles
Year	Tournament	Opponent	Score	Result
1994	U.S. Open	(China) Liu Guimei	11–8, 5–11, 6–11	(silver) Runner-up
1997	Vietnam Open	(Indonesia) Susi Susanti	4–11, 1–11	(silver) Runner-up
2001	Swiss Open	(France) Pi Hongyan	2–7, 1–7, 5–7	(silver) Runner-up
2004	German Open	(China) Xie Xingfang	11–9, 6–11, 7–11	(silver) Runner-up
2005	Swiss Open	(France) Pi Hongyan	12–13, 6–11	(silver) Runner-up
2005	Thailand Open	(Netherlands) Yao Jie	6–11, 7–11	(silver) Runner-up
2005	Thessaloniki World Grand Prix	(Germany) Juliane Schenk	11–2, 11–5	(gold) Winner
2005	Bitburger Open	(Singapore) Xing Aiying	11–3, 11–2	(gold) Winner
2005	Dutch Open	(Netherlands) Yao Jie	11–7, 11–2	(gold) Winner
2005	Denmark Open	(France) Pi Hongyan	11–7, 4–11, 5–11	(silver) Runner-up
2006	Swiss Open	(China) Zhu Lin	11–9, 11–4	(gold) Winner
2006	Bitburger Open	(Indonesia) Maria Kristin Yulianti	21–17, 21–17	(gold) Winner
2007	German Open	(China) Xie Xingfang	21–19, 12–21, 19–21	(silver) Runner-up
2007	Russian Open	(China) Wang Yihan	17–21, 21–16, 19–21	(silver) Runner-up

Women's doubles
Year	Tournament	Partner	Opponent	Score	Result
2001	Dutch Open	(Russia) Anastasia Russkikh	(Denmark) Pernille Harder (Denmark) Majken Vange	3–7, 7–2, 7–0, 4–7, 7–5	(gold) Winner

Mixed doubles
Year	Tournament	Partner	Opponent	Score	Result
1994	U.S. Open	(China) Zheng Yushen	(Denmark) Jens Eriksen (Denmark) Rikke Olsen	3–15, 4–15	(silver) Runner-up

BWF Grand Prix Gold tournament
BWF Grand Prix tournament

=== International Challenge/Series ===
Women's singles
Year	Tournament	Opponent	Score	Result
2000	Le Volant d'Or de Toulouse	(Ukraine) Elena Nozdran	11–4, 8–11, 11–4	(gold) Winner
2000	BMW Open International	(Netherlands) Judith Meulendijks	11–4, 11–5	(gold) Winner
2001	BMW Open International	(France) Pi Hongyan	4–7, 7–3, 2–7, 3–7	(silver) Runner-up
2002	BMW Open International	(France) Pi Hongyan	9–11, 1–11	(silver) Runner-up
2003	Polish Open	(Wales) Kelly Morgan	11–5, 9–11, 11–3	(gold) Winner
2003	Finnish Open	(Bulgaria) Petya Nedelcheva	11–6, 8–11, 11–5	(gold) Winner
2003	Austrian Open	(Bulgaria) Petya Nedelcheva	11–7, 11–1	(gold) Winner
2003	Giraldilla International	(Japan) Yuki Shimada	11–4, 11–7	(gold) Winner
2003	Spanish International	(Germany) Petra Overzier	11–4, 11–5	(gold) Winner
2003	Scottish International	(Japan) Chie Umezu	11–4, 11–5	(gold) Winner
2003	Bitburger Open	(France) Pi Hongyan	11–3, 11–2	(gold) Winner
2004	Swedish International	(Denmark) Tine Rasmussen	7–11, 11–4, 6–11	(silver) Runner-up
2004	Bitburger Open	(Germany) Petra Overzier	11–4, 11–2	(gold) Winner
2005	Belgian International	(Germany) Juliane Schenk	11–4, 11–1	(gold) Winner
2008	White Nights	(Germany) Juliane Schenk	21–15, 15–21, 21–19	(gold) Winner

Women's doubles
Year	Tournament	Partner	Opponent	Score	Result
2000	Le Volant d'Or de Toulouse	(Germany) Claudia Vogelgsang	(Germany) Nicole Grether (Germany) Nicol Pitro	7–15, 9–15	(silver) Runner-up
2000	BMW Open International	(Germany) Claudia Vogelgsang	(Germany) Nicole Grether (Germany) Nicol Pitro	13–15, 15–7, 17–14	(gold) Winner

=== Invitation Tournament ===
Women's singles
Year	Tournament	Opponent	Score	Result
2007	Copenhagen Masters	(Hong Kong) Zhou Mi	21–11, 19–21, 15–9 ret.	(gold) Winner
2008	Copenhagen Masters	(Denmark) Tine Baun	18–21, 17–21	(silver) Runner-up

== Record against selected opponents ==
Record against year-end Finals finalists, World Championships semi-finalists, and Olympic quarter-finalists.

Players	Matches	Results		Difference
Players	Matches	Won	Lost	Difference
(Australia) Huang Chia-chi	1	1	0	+1
(Bulgaria) Petya Nedelcheva	9	9	0	+9
(China) Gong Ruina	2	0	2	–2
(China) Lu Lan	7	2	5	–3
(China) Wang Lin	7	5	2	+3
(China) Wang Yihan	4	1	3	–2
(China) Xie Xingfang	9	0	9	–9
(China) Ye Zhaoying	2	0	2	–2
(China) Zhang Ning	3	0	3	–3
(China) Zhu Lin	7	2	5	–3
(Chinese Taipei) Cheng Shao-chieh	4	4	0	+4
(Denmark) Camilla Martin	1	0	1	–1
(Denmark) Tine Baun	11	7	4	+3

Players	Matches	Results		Difference
Players	Matches	Won	Lost	Difference
(England) Tracey Hallam	1	1	0	+1
(France) Pi Hongyan	20	8	12	–4
(Germany) Juliane Schenk	7	6	1	+5
(Germany) Petra Overzier	4	4	0	+4
(Hong Kong) / (China) Zhou Mi	7	3	4	–1
(Hong Kong) / (China) Wang Chen	4	1	3	–2
(Hong Kong) Yip Pui Yin	2	1	1	0
(India) Saina Nehwal	1	0	1	–1
(Indonesia) Maria Kristin Yulianti	3	3	0	+3
(Indonesia) Susi Susanti	1	0	1	–1
(Malaysia) Wong Mew Choo	3	2	1	+1
(Netherlands) / (Indonesia) Mia Audina	8	3	5	–2
(Thailand) Porntip Buranaprasertsuk	1	1	0	+1
