= Pi Hongyan =

French-Chinese badminton player (born 1979)

Pi Hongyan 皮红艳
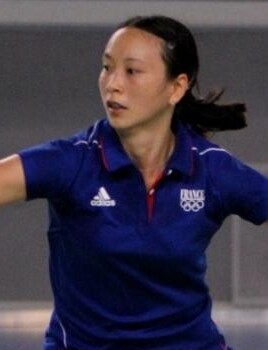
- Pi at the 2012 Summer Olympics

Personal information
- Born: 25 January 1979 (age 47) Chongqing, China
- Height: 1.64 m (5 ft 5 in)
- Weight: 53 kg (117 lb)

Sport
- Country: France
- Sport: Badminton
- Handedness: Right
- Retired: 2012

Women's singles
- Highest ranking: 2
- BWF profile
Medal record
Women's badminton
Representing France
World Championships
Bronze medal – third place	2009 Hyderabad	Women's singles
European Championships
Silver medal – second place	2004 Geneva	Women's singles
Bronze medal – third place	2008 Herning	Women's singles
Bronze medal – third place	2010 Manchester	Women's singles
Representing China
Asian Junior Championships
Gold medal – first place	1997 Manila	Girls' team
Bronze medal – third place	1997 Manila	Girls' singles

Pi Hongyan (simplified Chinese: 皮红艳; traditional Chinese: 皮紅艷; pinyin: Pí Hóngyàn; born 25 January 1979) is a former Chinese badminton player, who later represented France.

== Career ==
Pi Hongyan is one of a number of talented Chinese-born badminton players who have emigrated from China, in part, because of the intense competition to gain positions on its national team, and because of the elite status within the sport that such a player is likely to hold in other badminton playing countries. Her titles include women's singles at the U.S. (1999), German (2001, 2002), Bitburger (2001, 2002), Portugal (2001, 2003), Swiss (2001, 2005), Croatian (2003), French (2003, 2004, 2005), Dutch (2004), Denmark (2005), Singapore (2006) and India (2009) Opens. At the biennial European Championships she was a silver medalist in 2004 and a bronze medalist in 2008 and 2010. She was runner-up to China's Xie Xingfang at the prestigious All-England Championships in 2007. Pi has been at least a quarter-finalist in each of the following six consecutive BWF World Championships (2005, 2006, 2007, 2009, 2010, and 2011), with a bronze medal in 2009, as well as a quarter-finalist at the 2008 Beijing Olympic Games.

== Achievements ==
=== BWF World Championships ===
Women's singles
Year	Venue	Opponent	Score	Result
2009	Gachibowli Indoor Stadium; Hyderabad, India	(China) Xie Xingfang	18–21, 8–21	Bronze

=== European Championships ===
Women's singles
Year	Venue	Opponent	Score	Result
2004	Queue d’Arve Sport Center; Geneva, Switzerland	(Netherlands) Mia Audina	1–11, 0–11	Silver
2008	Messecenter; Herning, Denmark	(Germany) Xu Huaiwen	11–21, 21–4, 18–21	Bronze
2010	Manchester Evening News Arena; Manchester, England	(Germany) Juliane Schenk	14–21, 13–21	Bronze

=== Asian Junior Championships ===
Girls' singles
Year	Venue	Opponent	Score	Result
1997	Ninoy Aquino Stadium; Manila, Philippines	(China) Gong Ruina	6–11, 11–4, 10–12	Bronze

=== BWF Superseries ===
The BWF Superseries, which was launched on 14 December 2006 and implemented in 2007, was a series of elite badminton tournaments, sanctioned by the Badminton World Federation (BWF). BWF Superseries levels were Superseries and Superseries Premier. A season of Superseries consisted of twelve tournaments around the world that had been introduced since 2011. Successful players were invited to the Superseries Finals, which were held at the end of each year.

Women's singles
Year	Tournament	Opponent	Score	Result
2007	All England Open	(China) Xie Xingfang	6–21, 13–21	(silver) Runner-up
2007	French Open	(China) Xie Xingfang	13–21, 13–21	(silver) Runner-up
2009	Korea Open	(Denmark) Tine Rasmussen	19–21, 19–21	(silver) Runner-up

BWF Super Series Finals tournament
BWF Super Series Premier tournament
BWF Super Series tournament

=== BWF Grand Prix ===
The BWF Grand Prix had two levels, the Grand Prix and Grand Prix Gold. It was a series of badminton tournaments sanctioned by the Badminton World Federation (BWF) and played between 2007 and 2017. The World Badminton Grand Prix was sanctioned by the International Badminton Federation from 1983 to 2006.

Women's singles
Year	Tournament	Opponent	Score	Result
1999	U.S. Open	(China) Wu Huimin	11–8, 11–3	(gold) Winner
2001	Swiss Open	(Germany) Xu Huaiwen	7–2, 7–1, 7–5	(gold) Winner
2001	German Open	(Ukraine) Elena Nozdran	7–1, 7–5, 7–2	(gold) Winner
2001	Denmark Open	(Denmark) Camilla Martin	6–8, 3–7, 0–7	(silver) Runner-up
2002	German Open	(Netherlands) Yao Jie	4–11, 11–9, 11–7	(gold) Winner
2003	Chinese Taipei Open	(Netherlands) Mia Audina	13–10, 2–11, 3–11	(silver) Runner-up
2004	Dutch Open	(Netherlands) Yao Jie	11–5, 11–4	(gold) Winner
2005	Swiss Open	(Germany) Xu Huaiwen	13–12, 11–6	(gold) Winner
2005	Denmark Open	(Germany) Xu Huaiwen	7–11, 11–4, 11–5	(gold) Winner
2006	Singapore Open	(Netherlands) Mia Audina	22–20, 22–20	(gold) Winner
2007	Chinese Taipei Open	(Hong Kong) Wang Chen	18–21, 21–14, 24–26	(silver) Runner-up
2009	India Open	(Malaysia) Julia Wong Pei Xian	17–21, 21–15, 21–14	(gold) Winner
2011	Canada Open	(Chinese Taipei) Cheng Shao-chieh	15–21, 11–21	(silver) Runner-up
2011	Indonesia Grand Prix Gold	(China) Chen Xiaojia	21–19, 15–21, 17–21	(silver) Runner-up

BWF Grand Prix Gold tournament
BWF Grand Prix tournament

=== BWF International Challenge/Series ===
Women's singles
Year	Tournament	Opponent	Score	Result
2001	Portugal International	(Finland) Anu Weckström	11–8, 11–1	(gold) Winner
2001	BMW Open International	(Germany) Xu Huaiwen	7–4, 3–7, 7–2, 7–3	(gold) Winner
2002	BMW Open International	(Germany) Xu Huaiwen	11–9, 11–1	(gold) Winner
2003	Portugal International	(Netherlands) Judith Meulendijks	11–5, 11–5	(gold) Winner
2003	French International	(Netherlands) Judith Meulendijks	11–1, 11–5	(gold) Winner
2003	Croatian International	(Wales) Kelly Morgan	6–11, 11–5, 11–4	(gold) Winner
2003	Mauritius International	(Japan) Kanako Yonekura	5–11, 13–10, 11–4	(gold) Winner
2003	South Africa International	(Japan) Kanako Yonekura	6–11, 11–4, 11–9	(gold) Winner
2003	Bitburger International	(Germany) Xu Huaiwen	11–9, 5–11, 5–11	(silver) Runner-up
2004	French International	(China) Chen Lanting	11–5, 11–8	(gold) Winner
2005	French International	(Denmark) Anne Marie Pedersen	11–1, 11–2	(gold) Winner
2012	Swedish Masters	(Czech Republic) Kristina Gavnholt	21–13, 21–17	(gold) Winner

Mixed doubles
Year	Tournament	Partner	Opponent	Score	Result
2001	Portugal International	(Denmark) Kasper Kiim Jensen	(Germany) Björn Siegemund (Germany) Nicol Pitro	3–15, 1–15	(silver) Runner-up
2004	Bitburger International	(France) Svetoslav Stoyanov	(Denmark) Rasmus Andersen (Denmark) Britta Andersen	2–15, 12–15	(silver) Runner-up

BWF International Challenge tournament
BWF International Series tournament

== Record against selected opponents ==
Record against year-end Finals finalists, World Championships semi-finalists, and Olympic quarter-finalists.

Players	Matches	Results		Difference
Players	Matches	Won	Lost	Difference
(Australia) / (Chinese Taipei) Huang Chia-chi	3	3	0	+3
(Bulgaria) Petya Nedelcheva	10	7	3	+4
(China) Dai Yun	1	1	0	+1
(China) Gong Ruina	2	0	2	–2
(China) Li Xuerui	2	0	2	–2
(China) Lu Lan	3	2	1	+1
(China) Wang Lin	2	1	1	0
(China) Wang Shixian	4	1	3	–2
(China) Wang Xin	5	0	5	–5
(China) Wang Yihan	4	1	3	–2
(China) Xie Xingfang	10	1	9	–8
(China) Zhang Ning	17	3	14	–11
(China) Zhu Lin	11	3	8	–5
(Chinese Taipei) Cheng Shao-chieh	5	3	2	+1
(Chinese Taipei) Tai Tzu-ying	2	2	0	+2
(Denmark) Tine Baun	12	6	6	0
(Denmark) Camilla Martin	5	2	3	–1
(Denmark) Mette Sørensen	1	1	0	+1
(England) Tracey Hallam	6	4	2	+2

Players	Matches	Results		Difference
Players	Matches	Won	Lost	Difference
(Germany) Petra Overzier	2	2	0	+2
(Germany) Juliane Schenk	14	10	4	+6
(Germany) / (China) Xu Huaiwen	20	12	8	+4
(Hong Kong) / (China) Wang Chen	9	2	7	–5
(Hong Kong) Yip Pui Yin	6	4	2	+2
(Hong Kong) Zhou Mi	7	3	4	–1
(India) Saina Nehwal	7	5	2	+3
(Indonesia) Lindaweni Fanetri	1	1	0	+1
(Indonesia) Maria Kristin Yulianti	3	3	0	+3
(Japan) Minatsu Mitani	1	1	0	+1
(Japan) Nozomi Okuhara	1	1	0	+1
(Malaysia) Wong Mew Choo	5	3	2	+1
(Netherlands) Mia Audina	12	5	7	–2
(South Korea) Bae Yeon-ju	3	2	1	+1
(South Korea) Sung Ji-hyun	3	2	1	+1
(Spain) Carolina Marín	1	1	0	+1
(Thailand) Porntip Buranaprasertsuk	2	2	0	+2
(Thailand) Ratchanok Intanon	1	1	0	+1
