= Juliane Schenk =

German badminton player

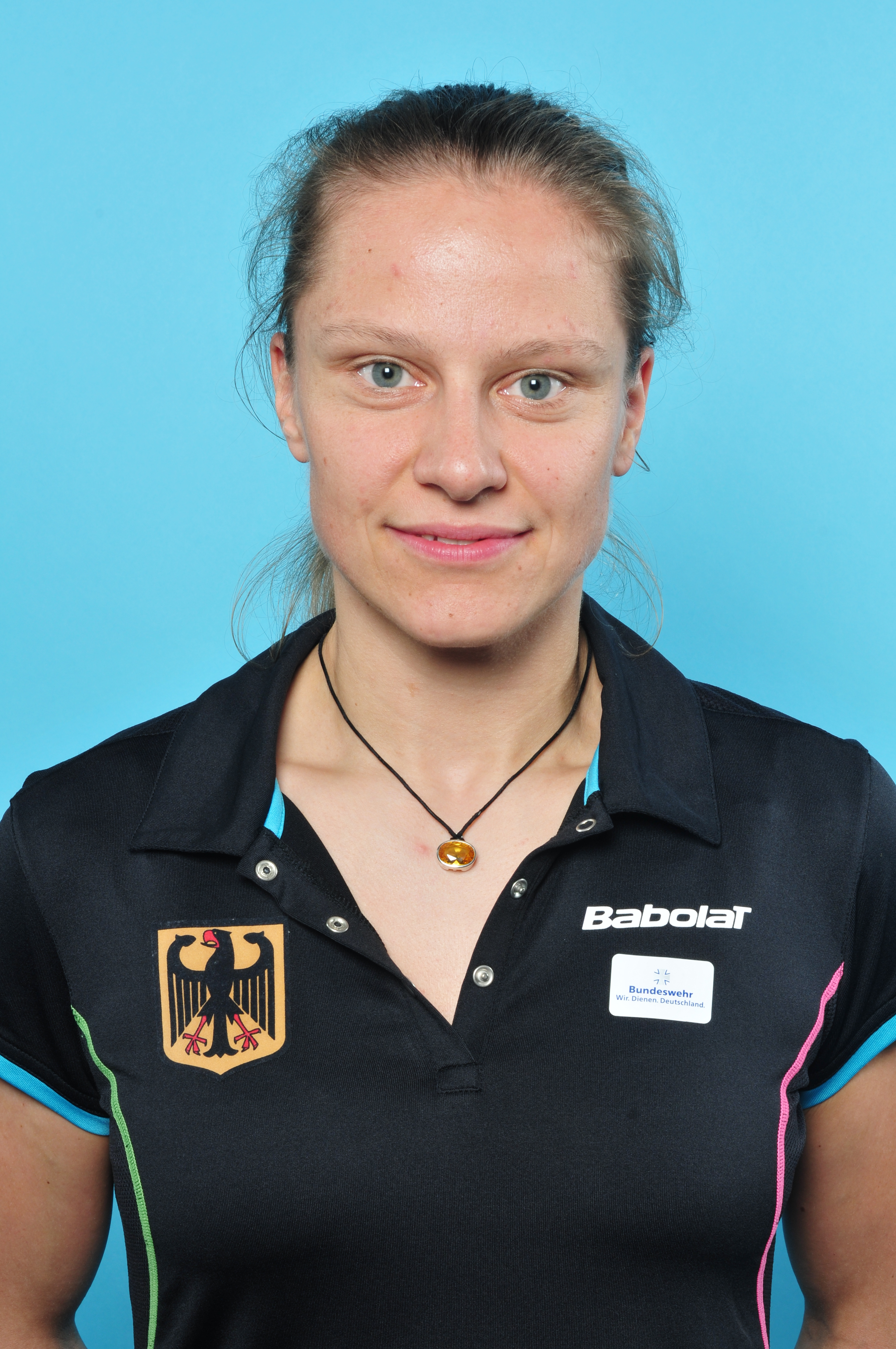

Personal information
- Born: 26 November 1982 (age 43) Krefeld, West Germany
- Height: 1.73 m (5 ft 8 in)

Sport
- Country: Germany
- Sport: Badminton
- Handedness: Right
- Retired: 2014

Women's singles
- Career record: 516 wins, 269 losses
- Highest ranking: 2 (20 June 2013)
- BWF profile
Medal record
Women's badminton
Representing Germany
World Championships
Bronze medal – third place	2011 London	Women's singles
Uber Cup
Bronze medal – third place	2008 Jakarta	Women's team
European Championships
Silver medal – second place	2010 Manchester	Women's singles
Silver medal – second place	2012 Karlskrona	Women's singles
Silver medal – second place	2006 Den Bosch	Women's doubles
Bronze medal – third place	2008 Herning	Women's singles
Bronze medal – third place	2006 Den Bosch	Women's singles
Bronze medal – third place	2004 Geneva	Women's doubles
European Mixed Team Championships
Silver medal – second place	2011 Amsterdam	Mixed team
Bronze medal – third place	2004 Geneva	Mixed team
European Women's Team Championships
Gold medal – first place	2012 Amsterdam	Women's team
Bronze medal – third place	2010 Warsaw	Women's team
Bronze medal – third place	2008 Almere	Women's team
Bronze medal – third place	2006 Thessalonica	Women's team
European Junior Championships
Gold medal – first place	1999 Glasgow	Mixed team
Gold medal – first place	2001 Spała	Girls' singles
Gold medal – first place	2001 Spała	Mixed team
Silver medal – second place	2001 Spała	Girls' doubles

Juliane Schenk (born 26 November 1982) is a German badminton player. In March 2014 she retired from international play.

== Career ==
In 2001, she won the European Junior Championships in women's singles. 2003 saw her win the women's doubles with Nicole Grether in two tournaments, the Irish International and the Bitburger Open.

Schenk played badminton at the 2004 Summer Olympics, losing in women's singles to Tracey Hallam of Great Britain in the round of 32. She also won the German championship in the women's doubles with Grether for the first time.

She also competed in women's doubles with partner Grether. They defeated Michelle Edwards and Chantal Botts of South Africa in the first round but were defeated by Ann-Lou Jørgensen and Rikke Olsen of Denmark in the round of 16.

She won the bronze medal at the 2008 European Badminton Championships.

In 2008, Schenk competed in the Beijing Olympics. She narrowly lost her first round match against Indonesian Maria Kristin Yulianti who later won the bronze medal.

Schenk nearly reached a bronze medal in the World Championship in Hyderabad in women's singles but lost to French Pi Hongyan in the final set, 19:21. It would have been another medal for German women after the shared bronze medals of Xu Huaiwen and Petra Overzier in 2006.

In 2010 European Badminton Championships, Schenk beat 1st seed Pi Hongyan to proceed to the final. She settled for silver after losing to Tine Rasmussen in three sets. In 2012 European Badminton Championships, she lost to Baun again in the final. At the 2012 Summer Olympics, she reached the last 16, being beaten by Ratchanok Intanon.

Schenk became an independent professional player in June, having severed ties with the German Badminton Association (DBV). Despite being left in the lurch, Schenk showed great determination to reach the Indonesian Open final in June. She did that with just one training session. In the first inaugural edition of the Indian Badminton League, held from 14 August 2013 to 31 August, Schenk joined Pune Pistons with a reported salary of $90,000.

Schenk also signed a contract with the Xiamen Tefang Badminton Club to compete in the 2013–2014 China Badminton Super League. She was beaten by Sun Yu from Guangzhou Huizhou Weihao 11–8 and 11–5, and later at the end of the year she was beaten by Wang Yihan 12–10, 6–11, 11–6.

In early 2014 in the China Badminton Super League, Schenk was beaten by Wang Shixian representing Jiangsu, 11–5, 11–5. Schenk had announced on her website earlier in the year that she was intent on getting out of the top ten so that she could avoid paying fines for missing Superseries Premier events. She retired the first round in 2014 Malaysia Super Series Premier against Minatsu Mitani and had a walkover to Beiwen Zhang in 2014 All England Super Series Premier. She told the Rheinische Post that she would be working as a personal trainer, that she was studying at the University of Cologne, and that she was writing a book.

At the end of April, she lost to Liu Xin in China Badminton League.

== Achievements ==
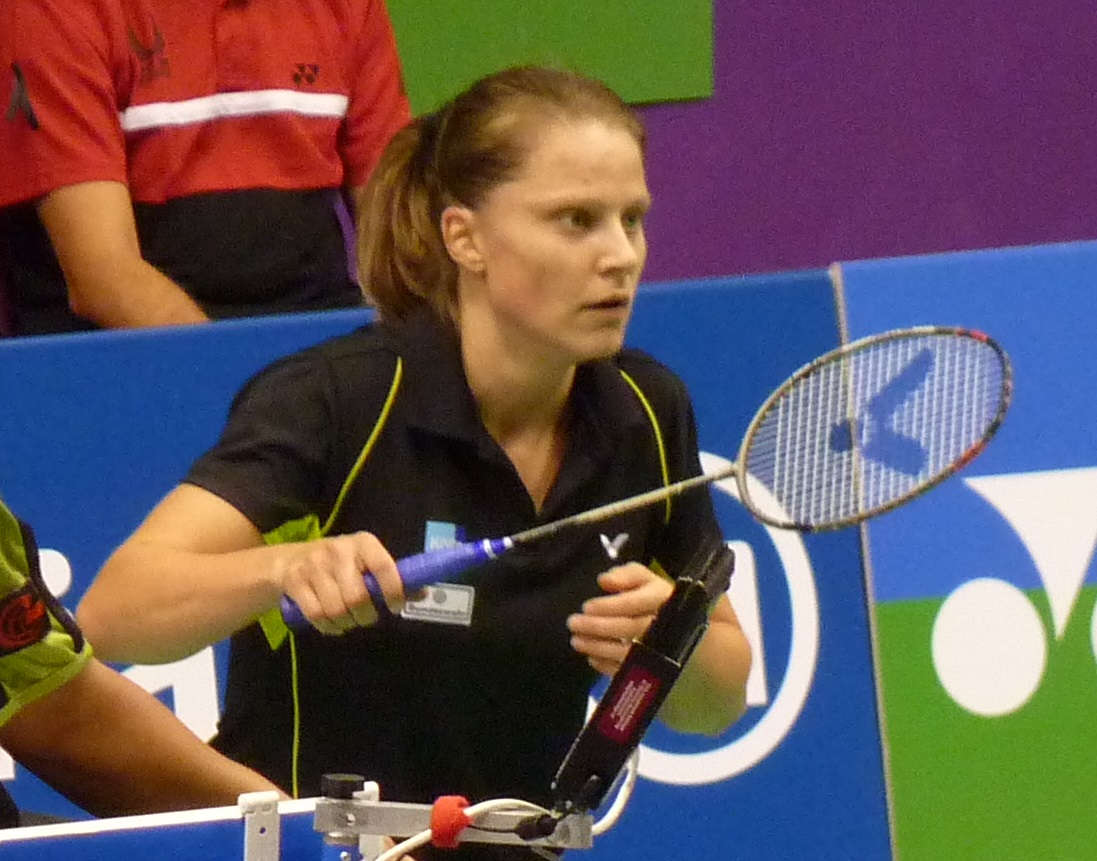
Schenk at 2010 BWF World Championships

=== BWF World Championships ===
Women's singles
Year	Venue	Opponent	Score	Result
2011	Wembley Arena, London, England	(Chinese Taipei) Cheng Shao-chieh	18–21, 6–21	Bronze

=== European Championships ===
Women's singles
Year	Venue	Opponent	Score	Result
2006	Maaspoort Sports and Events, Den Bosch, Netherlands	(Netherlands) Mia Audina	14–21, 16–21	Bronze
2008	Messecenter, Herning, Denmark	(Denmark) Tine Rasmussen	6–21, 21–16, 13–21	Bronze
2010	Manchester Evening News Arena, Manchester, England	(Denmark) Tine Rasmussen	19–21, 21–14, 18–21	Silver
2012	Telenor Arena, Karlskrona, Sweden	(Denmark) Tine Baun	19–21, 21–16, 19–21	Silver

Women's doubles
Year	Venue	Partner	Opponent	Score	Result
2004	Queue d’Arve Sport Center; Geneva, Switzerland	(Germany) Nicole Grether	(Denmark) Ann-Lou Jørgensen (Denmark) Rikke Olsen	12–15, 10–15	Bronze
2006	Maaspoort Sports and Events; Den Bosch, Netherlands	(Germany) Nicole Grether	(England) Donna Kellogg (England) Gail Emms	12–21, 10–21	Silver

=== European Junior Championships ===
Girls' singles
Year	Venue	Opponent	Score	Result
2001	Spała Olympic Center, Spała, Poland	(Poland) Kamila Augustyn	11–2, 11–9	Gold

Girls' doubles
Year	Venue	Partner	Opponent	Score	Result
2001	Spała Olympic Center, Spała, Poland	(Germany) Carina Mette	(Poland) Kamila Augustyn (Belarus) Nadieżda Kostiuczyk	2–15, 7–15	Silver

=== BWF Superseries ===
The BWF Superseries, which was launched on 14 December 2006 and implemented in 2007, was a series of elite badminton tournaments, sanctioned by the Badminton World Federation (BWF). BWF Superseries levels were Superseries and Superseries Premier. A season of Superseries consisted of twelve tournaments around the world that had been introduced since 2011. Successful players were invited to the Superseries Finals, which were held at the end of each year.

Women's singles
Year	Tournament	Opponent	Score	Result
2009	Superseries Finals	(Malaysia) Wong Mew Choo	15–21, 7–21	(silver) Runner-up
2011	Japan Open	(China) Wang Yihan	16–21, 14–21	(silver) Runner-up
2012	India Open	(China) Li Xuerui	21–14, 17–21, 8–21	(silver) Runner-up
2012	Singapore Open	(Chinese Taipei) Cheng Shao-chieh	21–11, 26–24	(gold) Winner
2012	Denmark Open	(India) Saina Nehwal	17–21, 8–21	(silver) Runner-up
2013	India Open	(Thailand) Ratchanok Intanon	20–22, 14–21	(silver) Runner-up
2013	Indonesia Open	(China) Li Xuerui	16–21, 21–18, 17–21	(silver) Runner-up

BWF Super Series Finals tournament
BWF Super Series Premier tournament
BWF Super Series tournament

=== BWF Grand Prix ===
The BWF Grand Prix had two levels, the Grand Prix and Grand Prix Gold. It was a series of badminton tournaments sanctioned by the Badminton World Federation (BWF) and played between 2007 and 2017. The World Badminton Grand Prix was sanctioned by the International Badminton Federation from 1983 to 2006.

Women's singles
Year	Tournament	Opponent	Score	Result
2005	Thessaloniki Grand Prix	(Germany) Xu Huaiwen	2–11, 5–11	(silver) Runner-up
2007	Bitburger Open	(China) Wang Yihan	21–16, 10–21, 17–21	(silver) Runner-up
2009	Bitburger Open	(Japan) Yu Hirayama	21–18, 21–10	(gold) Winner
2010	German Open	(China) Wang Xin	17–21, 18–21	(silver) Runner-up
2010	Canada Open	(China) Zhu Lin	19–21, 21–17, 10–21	(silver) Runner-up
2010	Dutch Open	(Netherlands) Yao Jie	21–13, 14–21, 21–15	(gold) Winner
2012	German Open	(China) Li Xuerui	19–21, 18–21	(silver) Runner-up
2012	Bitburger Open	(Netherlands) Yao Jie	21–10, 15–21, 25–23	(gold) Winner
2013	German Open	(China) Wang Yihan	14–21, 13–21	(silver) Runner-up

Women's doubles
Year	Tournament	Partner	Opponent	Score	Result
2005	Bitburger Open	(Germany) Nicole Grether	(Japan) Ikue Tatani (Japan) Aya Wakisaka	Walkover	(gold) Winner

BWF Grand Prix Gold tournament
BWF Grand Prix tournament

=== BWF International Challenge/Series ===
Women's singles
Year	Tournament	Opponent	Score	Result
2011	Morocco International	(Spain) Carolina Marín	17–21, 13–21	(silver) Runner-up
2010	Belgian International	(England) Elizabeth Cann	21–7, 21–5	(gold) Winner
2010	Spanish Open	(Netherlands) Judith Meulendijks	21–16, 21–12	(gold) Winner
2009	Norwegian International	(Netherlands) Rachel van Cutsen	21–12, 19–21, 21–11	(gold) Winner
2009	Finnish International	(Netherlands) Judith Meulendijks	21–13, 21–13	(gold) Winner
2009	Dutch International	(Bulgaria) Petya Nedelcheva	21–12, 21–16	(gold) Winner
2009	Austrian International	(Bulgaria) Petya Nedelcheva	20–22, 21–8, 22–20	(gold) Winner
2008	Italian International	(Ukraine) Larisa Griga	15–21, 21–13, 21–17	(gold) Winner
2008	Belgian International	(Scotland) Susan Hughes	21–12, 21–18	(gold) Winner
2008	European Circuit Finals	(Estonia) Kati Tolmoff	21–16, 21–14	(gold) Winner
2008	Polish International	(Bulgaria) Petya Nedelcheva	21–16, 21–7	(gold) Winner
2008	White Nights	(Germany) Xu Huaiwen	15–21, 21–15, 19–21	(silver) Runner-up
2007	Italian International	(Sweden) Sara Persson	21–16, 21–6	(gold) Winner
2007	Norwegian International	(Ukraine) Larisa Griga	21–12, 21–17	(gold) Winner
2007	Turkey International	(Bulgaria) Petya Nedelcheva	14–21, 21–12 retired	(gold) Winner
2007	Spanish Open	(Netherlands) Judith Meulendijks	21–19, 12–21, 21–14	(gold) Winner
2006	Finnish International	(China) Li Wenyan	21–19, 14–21, 17–21	(silver) Runner-up
2006	Austrian International	(Sweden) Sara Persson	21–19, 21–13	(gold) Winner
2006	Dutch International	(Germany) Petra Overzier	21–18, 19–21, 18–21	(silver) Runner-up
2005	Norwegian International	(Germany) Petra Overzier	11–6, 13–11	(gold) Winner
2005	Belgian International	(Germany) Xu Huaiwen	4–11, 1–11	(silver) Runner-up
2005	Irish International	(Russia) Ella Karachkova	3–11, 8–11	(silver) Runner-up

Women's doubles
Year	Tournament	Partner	Opponent	Score	Result
2007	Turkey International	(Germany) Nicole Grether	(Bulgaria) Diana Dimova (Bulgaria) Petya Nedelcheva	Walkover	(gold) Winner
2007	Spanish Open	(Germany) Nicole Grether	(England) Natalie Munt (England) Joanne Nicholas	21–11, 20–22, 25–23	(gold) Winner
2006	Dutch International	(Germany) Nicole Grether	(Denmark) Kamilla Rytter Juhl (Denmark) Lena Frier Kristiansen	21–8, 21–12	(gold) Winner
2005	Norwegian International	(Germany) Nicole Grether	(Malaysia) Lim Pek Siah (Malaysia) Ang Li Peng	15–8, 15–6	(gold) Winner
2005	Belgian International	(Germany) Nicole Grether	(Germany) Michaela Peiffer (Germany) Birgit Overzier	15–6, 15–1	(gold) Winner
2005	Dutch International	(Germany) Nicole Grether	(Sweden) Elin Bergblom (Sweden) Johanna Persson	15–4, 15–9	(gold) Winner
2003	Irish International	(Germany) Nicole Grether	(England) Liza Parker (England) Suzanne Rayappan	15–0, 15–1	(gold) Winner
2003	Scottish International	(Germany) Nicole Grether	(Japan) Kumiko Ogura (Japan) Reiko Shiota	15–8, 11–15, 12–15	(silver) Runner-up
2003	Mauritius International	(Germany) Nicole Grether	(Japan) Seiko Yamada (Japan) Shizuka Yamamoto	15–9, 15–4	(gold) Winner
2003	Bitburger International	(Germany) Nicole Grether	(Poland) Kamila Augustyn (Poland) Nadieżda Kostiuczyk	15–9, 10–15, 15–12	(gold) Winner
2002	Irish International	(Germany) Nicole Grether	(England) Ella Tripp (England) Joanne Wright	4–11, 11–8, 7–11	(silver) Runner-up
2002	Scottish International	(Germany) Nicole Grether	(Scotland) Yuan Wemyss (Scotland) Kirsteen McEwan	Walkover	(silver) Runner-up
2002	Dutch International	(Germany) Carina Mette	(Denmark) Tine Høy (Denmark) Karina Sørensen	7–4, 7–8, 2–7, 8–7, 7–5	(gold) Winner

BWF International Challenge tournament
BWF International Series tournament

== Record against selected opponents ==
Record against year-end Finals finalists, World Championships semi-finalists, and Olympic quarter-finalists.

Players	Matches	Results		Difference
Players	Matches	Won	Lost	Difference
(Bulgaria) Petya Nedelcheva	11	9	2	+7
(China) Gong Ruina	3	0	3	–3
(China) Li Xuerui	7	1	6	–5
(China) Lu Lan	1	0	1	–1
(China) Wang Lin	3	2	1	+1
(China) Wang Shixian	9	3	6	–3
(China) Wang Xin	4	1	3	–2
(China) Wang Yihan	10	2	8	–6
(China) Xie Xingfang	4	0	4	–4
(China) Zhang Ning	5	0	5	–5
(China) Zhu Lin	4	0	4	–4
(Chinese Taipei) Cheng Shao-chieh	9	4	5	–1
(Chinese Taipei) Tai Tzu-ying	4	3	1	+2
(Denmark) Tine Baun	11	3	8	–5
(Denmark) Camilla Martin	3	0	3	–3
(England) Tracey Hallam	4	2	2	0
(France) Pi Hongyan	14	4	10	–6

Players	Matches	Results		Difference
Players	Matches	Won	Lost	Difference
(Germany) Petra Overzier	2	2	0	+2
(Germany) Xu Huaiwen	7	1	6	–5
(Hong Kong) Wang Chen	4	0	4	–4
(Hong Kong) Yip Pui Yin	8	5	3	+2
(Hong Kong) Zhou Mi	4	1	3	–2
(India) Saina Nehwal	13	5	8	–3
(India) P. V. Sindhu	2	2	0	+2
(Indonesia) Lindaweni Fanetri	2	2	0	+2
(Indonesia) Maria Kristin Yulianti	1	0	1	–1
(Japan) Minatsu Mitani	2	0	2	–2
(Malaysia) Wong Mew Choo	2	0	2	–2
(Netherlands) Mia Audina	3	0	3	–3
(South Korea) Bae Yeon-ju	10	8	2	+6
(South Korea) Sung Ji-hyun	7	4	3	+1
(Spain) Carolina Marín	2	0	2	–2
(Thailand) Porntip Buranaprasertsuk	3	2	1	+1
(Thailand) Ratchanok Intanon	9	3	6	–3
