= Tine Baun =

Danish badminton player

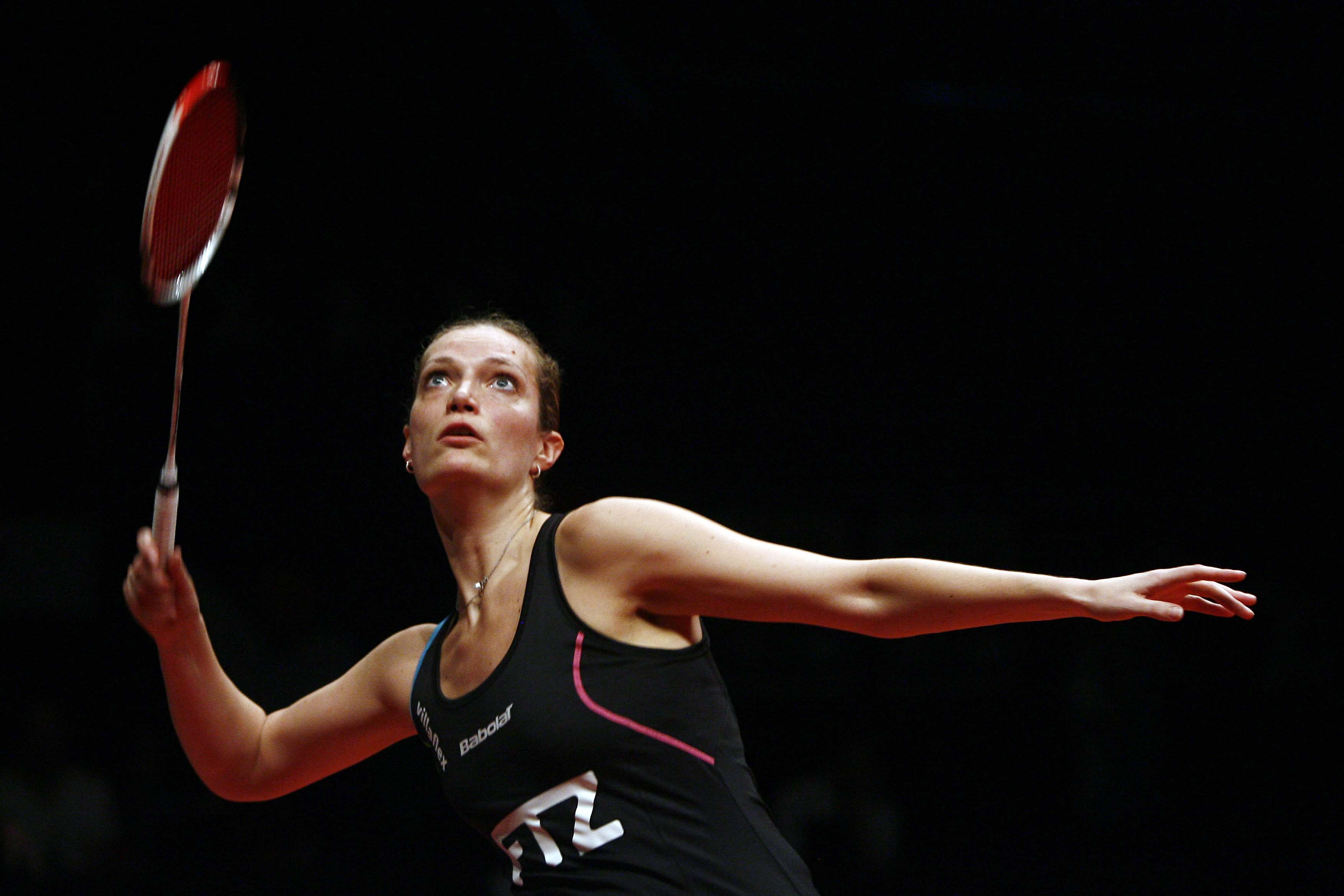
- Tine Baun in 2013

Personal information
- Born: Tine Rasmussen; 21 July 1979 (age 47) Hørsholm, Denmark
- Height: 1.81 m (5 ft 11 in)
- Weight: 71 kg (157 lb; 11.2 st)

Sport
- Country: Denmark
- Sport: Badminton
- Handedness: Right
- Retired: 2013

Women's singles
- Career record: 331 wins, 166 losses
- Highest ranking: 1 (6 November 2008)
- BWF profile
Medal record
Women's badminton
Representing Denmark
World Championships
Bronze medal – third place	2010 Paris	Women's singles
Sudirman Cup
Silver medal – second place	2011 Qingdao	Mixed team
Bronze medal – third place	2005 Beijing	Mixed team
European Championships
Gold medal – first place	2010 Manchester	Women's singles
Gold medal – first place	2012 Karlskrona	Women's singles
Silver medal – second place	2008 Herning	Women's singles
European Women's Team Championships
Gold medal – first place	2008 Almere	Women's team
Gold medal – first place	2010 Warsaw	Women's team
Silver medal – second place	2012 Amsterdam	Women's team
European Junior Championships
Gold medal – first place	1997 Nymburk	Mixed team
Silver medal – second place	1997 Nymburk	Girls' singles

Tine Baun (née Rasmussen; born 21 July 1979) is a Danish former badminton player. Most notably, she won the All England Open Badminton Championships women's singles title three times in 2008, 2010, and 2013 – the last of these being her final tournament before retirement.

== Career ==
Baun started playing badminton at the age of 7. She played at Lynge, a small club in North Zealand, Denmark. She said she really liked traveling around the world and learning other cultures through sports. She made her international debut in 1996 at the Denmark Open, and since finishing her education in 1999, she started playing badminton professionally full time.

At the 2004 Summer Olympics, Baun was eliminated by Petya Nedelcheva in round 32. At the BWF Super Series, she won the 2007 Japan Open, beating all Chinese-born players from the first match, including the 1st seed, Zhang Ning, in the quarterfinal. She also won the 2008 Singapore Super Series, beating Zhou Mi in the final.

She won the silver medal at the 2008 European Badminton Championships after losing to Huaiwen Xu in the final with a rubber set. Baun also played at the 2008 Olympics in Beijing as the 6th seed. She beat Akvile Stapusaityte in the round of 32, but was eliminated after losing to Maria Kristin Yulianti 21–18, 19–21, 14–21 in the round of 16.

Baun claimed three titles in 2009, defending the Malaysia Open title by beating the 1st seed, Zhou Mi in the final, the Korea Open by beating Pi Hongyan, and the Denmark Open by beating the 1st seeded, Wang Yihan. She played in the 2009 All England Super Series as the first seed, reaching the final by beating two younger competitors in the quarterfinal and semi-final. She lost in the final to Wang Yihan, thus losing her title with a score of 19–21, 23–21, 11–21.

Baun won the gold medal at the 2010 European Badminton Championships after beating Juliane Schenk in the final. In the 2012 European Badminton Championships, she defended her title against the same opponent. In 2010 she won a bronze medal at the BWF World Championships held in Paris. She was defeated in the semi-finals by Wang Lin with a score of 11–21, 8–21.

At the 2012 Summer Olympics, she reached the quarter finals, losing to Saina Nehwal of India 2–0. After progressing no further than the quarter finals in the Super Series tournaments of 2012 and 2013, she ended her career high by winning the prestigious All England Open against 18-year-old Ratchanok Intanon of Thailand. It was her third All England title and fourth time reaching the final in that tournament.

After retiring, she joined the Europe All Stars Team to participate in the 2013 Axiata Cup. In the preliminary round, she was defeated by Intanon from Thailand in three sets, scoring 21–9, 13–21, 12–21. In August 2013, Baun played at the Indian Badminton League for the Mumbai Masters team, earning a reported salary of $30,000.

== Personal life ==
Rasmussen married Martin Baun, her physiotherapist, in May 2010.

== Achievements ==
=== BWF World Championships ===
Women's singles
Year	Venue	Opponent	Score	Result
2010	Stade Pierre de Coubertin, Paris, France	(China) Wang Lin	11–21, 8–21	Bronze

=== European Championships ===
Women's singles
Year	Venue	Opponent	Score	Result
2008	Messecenter Herning; Herning, Denmark	(Germany) Huaiwen Xu	21–12, 12–21, 17–21	Silver
2010	Manchester Evening News Arena, Manchester, England	(Germany) Juliane Schenk	21–19, 14–21, 21–18	Gold
2012	Telenor Arena; Karlskrona, Sweden	(Germany) Juliane Schenk	21–19, 16–21, 21–19	Gold

=== European Junior Championships ===
Girls' singles
Year	Venue	Opponent	Score	Result
1997	Nymburk, Czech Republic	(Netherlands) Judith Meulendijks	11–6, 9–12, 6–11	Silver

=== BWF Superseries ===
The BWF Superseries, which was launched on 14 December 2006 and implemented in 2007, was a series of elite badminton tournaments, sanctioned by the Badminton World Federation (BWF). BWF Superseries levels were Superseries and Superseries Premier. A season of Superseries consisted of twelve tournaments around the world that had been introduced since 2011. Successful players were invited to the Superseries Finals, which were held at the end of each year.

Women's singles
Year	Tournament	Opponent	Score	Result
2007	Japan Open	(China) Xie Xingfang	21–15, 21–17	(gold) Winner
2008	Malaysia Open	(China) Zhu Lin	18–21, 21–19, 21–18	(gold) Winner
2008	All England Open	(China) Lu Lan	21–11, 18–21, 22–20	(gold) Winner
2008	Singapore Open	(Hong Kong) Zhou Mi	21–19, 21–17	(gold) Winner
2009	All England Open	(China) Wang Yihan	19–21, 23–21, 11–21	(silver) Runner-up
2009	Malaysia Open	(Hong Kong) Zhou Mi	21–17, 15–21, 21–16	(gold) Winner
2009	Korea Open	(France) Pi Hongyan	21–19, 21–19	(gold) Winner
2009	Denmark Open	(China) Wang Yihan	21–14, 19–21, 21–14	(gold) Winner
2010	China Masters	(China) Wang Xin	19–21, 9–21	(silver) Runner-up
2010	All England Open	(China) Wang Yihan	21–14, 18–21, 21–19	(gold) Winner
2011	Singapore Open	(China) Wang Xin	19–21, 17–21	(silver) Runner-up
2011	Hong Kong Open	(China) Wang Xin	17–21, 14–21	(silver) Runner-up
2013	All England Open	(Thailand) Ratchanok Intanon	21–14, 16–21, 21–10	(gold) Winner

BWF Super Series Premier tournament
BWF Super Series tournament

=== IBF International ===
Women's singles
Year	Tournament	Opponent	Score	Result
1997	BMW Open International	(Germany) Heike Schönharting	12–9, 11–9	(gold) Winner
2001	French International	(Netherlands) Brenda Beenhakker	2–7, 6–8, 7–5, 1–7	(silver) Runner-up
2002	Norwegian International	(Bulgaria) Petya Nedelcheva	3–11, 13–12, 11–8	(gold) Winner
2002	Scottish International	(Japan) Yuki Shimada	9–11, 11–8, 3–11	(silver) Runner-up
2003	Norwegian International	(Bulgaria) Petya Nedelcheva	11–7, 11–5	(gold) Winner
2003	Le Volant d'Or de Toulouse	(Italy) Jeanine Cicognini	11–3, 11–3	(gold) Winner
2003	Irish Open	(Wales) Kelly Morgan	11–9, 11–5	(gold) Winner
2004	Swedish International	(Germany) Huaiwen Xu	11–7, 4–11, 11–6	(gold) Winner
2005	Italian International	(Finland) Anu Nieminen	11–4, 11–5	(gold) Winner
2006	Swedish International	(Germany) Petra Overzier	21–18, 21–16	(gold) Winner

== Record against selected opponents ==
Record against year-end Finals finalists, World Championships semi-finalists, and Olympic quarter-finalists.

Players	Matches	Results		Difference
Players	Matches	Won	Lost	Difference
(Bulgaria) Petya Nedelcheva	9	6	3	+3
(China) Dai Yun	1	0	1	–1
(China) Gong Ruina	2	0	2	–2
(China) Gong Zhichao	1	0	1	–1
(China) Li Xuerui	3	1	2	–1
(China) Lu Lan	6	4	2	+2
(China) Wang Lin	4	2	2	0
(China) Wang Shixian	4	2	2	0
(China) Wang Xin	9	0	9	–9
(China) Wang Yihan	13	5	8	–3
(China) Xie Xingfang	12	1	11	–10
(China) Yao Yan	1	0	1	–1
(China) Zhang Ning	5	1	4	–3
(China) Zhu Lin	3	2	1	+1
(Chinese Taipei) Cheng Shao-chieh	3	3	0	+3
(Chinese Taipei) Tai Tzu-ying	4	2	2	0
(Denmark) Mette Sørensen	1	0	1	–1
(England) Tracey Hallam	5	4	1	+3

Players	Matches	Results		Difference
Players	Matches	Won	Lost	Difference
(France) Pi Hongyan	12	6	6	0
(Germany) Juliane Schenk	11	8	3	+5
(Germany) / (China) Huaiwen Xu	11	4	7	–3
(Hong Kong) / (China) Wang Chen	11	6	5	+1
(Hong Kong) Yip Pui Yin	5	4	1	+3
(Hong Kong) / (China) Zhou Mi	10	3	7	–4
(India) Saina Nehwal	10	5	5	0
(India) P. V. Sindhu	1	1	0	+1
(Indonesia) Lindaweni Fanetri	1	1	0	+1
(Indonesia) Maria Kristin Yulianti	2	1	1	0
(Japan) Minatsu Mitani	2	0	2	–2
(Malaysia) Wong Mew Choo	6	5	1	+4
(Netherlands) Mia Audina	2	0	2	–2
(South Korea) Sung Ji-hyun	7	6	1	+5
(Spain) Carolina Marín	3	2	1	+1
(Thailand) Porntip Buranaprasertsuk	3	2	1	+1
(Thailand) Ratchanok Intanon	5	2	3	–1

== Career overview ==
Singles	Played	Wins	Losses	Balance
Total*	456	310	146	+164

Doubles	Played	Wins	Losses	Balance
Total*	41	21	20	+1
