= 2005 All England Open Badminton Championships =

2005 All England Championships
Tournament details
- Dates: 8 March 2005– 13 March 2005
- Edition: 95th
- Location: Birmingham

The 2005 Yonex All England Open was the 95th edition of the All England Open Badminton Championships. It was a four star tournament held in Birmingham, England, from 8 to 13 March 2005.

== Venue ==
- National Indoor Arena

== Final results ==
Category	Winners	Runners-up	Score
Men's singles	(China) Chen Hong	(China) Lin Dan	8–15, 15–5, 15–2
Women's singles	(China) Xie Xingfang	(China) Zhang Ning	11–3, 11–9
Men's doubles	(China) Cai Yun & Fu Haifeng	(Denmark) Lars Paaske & Jonas Rasmussen	15–10, 15–6
Women's doubles	(China) Gao Ling & Huang Sui	(China) Wei Yili & Zhao Tingting	15–10, 15–13
Mixed doubles	(England) Nathan Robertson & Gail Emms	(Denmark) Thomas Laybourn & Kamilla Rytter Juhl	15–10, 15–12

== Men's singles ==
=== Section 1 ===
Round of 32
(China) Chen Hong	15	15
(Japan) Shinya Ohtsuka	11	10
(South Korea) Shon Seung-mo	15	15
(Guatemala) Pedro Yang	6	9
(China) Bao Chunlai	15	15
(Poland) Przemysław Wacha	7	4
(South Korea) Ahn Hyun-suk	10	15	15
(China) Chen Jin	15	12	7
(Malaysia) Lee Chong Wei	15	15
(Singapore) Kendrick Lee Yen Hui	8	9
(Malaysia) Kuan Beng Hong	15	15
(Denmark) Anders Boesen	11	8
(Malaysia) Muhammad Roslin Hashim	15	15
(Canada) Andrew Dabeka	6	7
(Denmark) Peter Gade	15	15
(Sweden) Rasmus Wengberg	3	1

Round of 16
(China) Chen Hong	15	15
(South Korea) Seung-mo	8	3
(China) Chunlai	15	15
(South Korea) Suk Ahn	5	2
(Malaysia) Lee Chong Wei	15	15
(Malaysia) Kuan	12	3
(Malaysia) Roslin Hashim	9	17	15
(Denmark) Gade	15	15	12

Quarter-finals
(China) Chen Hong	13	15	15
(China) Chunlai	15	12	4
(Malaysia) Lee Chong Wei	15	15
(Malaysia) Roslin Hashim	7	9

Semi-finals
(China) Chen Hong	15	15
(Malaysia) Lee Chong Wei	13	10

=== Section 2 ===
Round of 32
(China) Lin Dan	15	6	15
(Denmark) Kasper Ødum	7	15	7
(England) Aamir Ghaffar	10	15	15
(Netherlands) Dicky Palyama	15	13	12
(South Korea) Lee Hyun-il	15	15
(South Korea) Park Sung-hwan	2	6
(Malaysia) Sairul Amar Ayob	15	10	15
(Denmark) Michael Christensen	5	15	1
(Malaysia) Choong Hann Wong	15	15
(China) Chen Yu	13	10
(Chinese Taipei) Liao Sheng-shuin	15	14	15
(India) Arvind Bhat	9	17	10
(Japan) Shōji Satō	7	15	15
(Denmark) Kenneth Jonassen	15	8	10
(Malaysia) Muhammad Hafiz Hashim	15	15
(Germany) Marc Zwiebler	8	4

Round of 16
(China) Lin Dan	15	15
(England) Ghaffar	4	11
(South Korea) Hyun-il	15	10	15
(Malaysia) Ayob	10	15	4
(Malaysia) Wong	15	15
(Chinese Taipei) Liao	8	2
(Japan) Satō	15	15
(Malaysia) Hafiz Hashim	2	12

Quarter-finals
(China) Lin Dan	15	13	15
(South Korea) Hyun-il	10	15	8
(Malaysia) Wong	11	15	15
(Japan) Satō	15	2	3

Semi-finals
(China) Lin Dan	15	12	15
(Malaysia) Wong	8	15	1

== Women's singles ==
=== Section 1 ===
Round of 32
(China) Xie Xingfang	11	11
(New Zealand) Rebecca Bellingham	2	4
(Japan) Yu Hirayama	9	11	13
(Scotland) Yuan Wemyss	11	1	10
(South Korea) Seo Yoon-hee	11	11
(Bulgaria) Petya Nedelcheva	2	3
(Hong Kong) Wang Chen	11	11
(Indonesia) Adrianti Firdasari	5	3
(Netherlands) Mia Audina	11	11
(England) Elizabeth Cann	8	9
(China) Gong Ruina	11	7	w/o
(England) Julia Mann	5	0	ret
(Japan) Kaori Mori	11	11
(France) Pi Hongyan	6	7
(South Korea) Hwang Hye-youn	11	11
(South Korea) Jang Soo-young	2	4

Round of 16
(China) Xingfang	11	11
(Japan) Hirayama	7	3
(South Korea) Seo	5	11	11
(Hong Kong) Wang Chen	11	5	9
(Netherlands) Audina	11	11
(China) Ruina	7	5
(Japan) Mori	11	8	11
(South Korea) Hwang	8	11	5

Quarter-finals
(China) Xingfang	11	11
(South Korea) Seo	3	3
(Netherlands) Audina	11	11
(Japan) Mori	8	4

Semi-finals
(China) Xingfang	11	11
(Netherlands) Audina	8	5

=== Section 2 ===
Round of 32
(China) Zhang Ning	11	6	11
(Russia) Ella Karachkova	2	11	6
(Malaysia) Wong Mew Choo	11	11
(Taiwan) Cheng Shao-chieh	6	1
(South Korea) Jun Jae-youn	11	11
(Denmark) Tine Rasmussen	9	1
(Japan) Kanako Yonekura	11	11
(Scotland) Susan Hughes	3	5
(Japan) Eriko Hirose	11	11
(Indonesia) Maria Kristin Yulianti	4	2
(Netherlands) Yao Jie	11	11
(England) Jill Pittard	1	1
(Germany) Xu Huaiwen	11	11
(China) Wang Rong	1	2
(China) Zhou Mi	11	11
(India) Aparna Popat	6	8

Round of 16
(China) Zhang Ning	11	13
(Malaysia) Wong	7	12
(South Korea) Jun	11	11
(Japan) Yonekura	5	8
(Japan) Hirose	11	11
(Netherlands) Yao Jie	4	3
(Germany) Huaiwen	11	11
(China) Zhou Mi	6	4

Quarter-finals
(China) Zhang Ning	11	11
(South Korea) Jun	4	2
(Japan) Hirose	11	11
(Germany) Huaiwen	6	7

Semi-finals
(China) Zhang Ning	11	9	11
(Japan) Hirose	4	11	1
