= Badminton at the 2004 Summer Olympics – Women's singles =

Women's singles at the Games of the XXVIII Olympiad
- Venue: Goudi Olympic Hall
- Date: 14–19 August 2004
- Competitors: 32 from 21 nations

Medalists
1st place, gold medalist(s)		Zhang Ning	China
2nd place, silver medalist(s)		Mia Audina	Netherlands
3rd place, bronze medalist(s)		Zhou Mi	China

These are the results of the women's singles competition in badminton at the 2004 Summer Olympics in Athens.

== Medalists ==
Gold	Silver	Bronze
Zhang Ning (CHN)	Mia Audina (NED)	Zhou Mi (CHN)

== Draw ==
Round of 32
1	Gong Ruina (CHN)	11	11
32	Li Li (SIN)	9	4
17	Salakjit Ponsana (THA)	11	5	11
16	Miho Tanaka (JPN)	7	11	8
9	Jun Jae-youn (KOR)	11	11
24	Charmaine Reid (CAN)	4	5
25	Cheng Shao-chieh (TPE)	11	11
8	Ling Wan Ting (HKG)	9	8
5	Mia Audina (NED)	11	11
28	Nigella Saunders (JAM)	4	1
21	Aparna Popat (IND)	11	11
12	Michelle Edwards (RSA)	6	3
13	Camilla Martin (DEN)	11	11
20	Kanako Yonekura (JPN)	4	7
29	Tracey Hallam (GBR)	11	6	11
4	Juliane Schenk (GER)	7	11	9
3	Petya Nedelcheva (BUL)	8	11	13
30	Tine Rasmussen (DEN)	11	7	11
19	Seo Yoon-hee (KOR)	11	6	11
14	Pi Hongyan (FRA)	6	11	7
11	Kaori Mori (JPN)	11	11
22	Anu Weckström (FIN)	5	4
27	Zhou Mi (CHN)	9	11	11
6	Xu Huaiwen (GER)	11	5	2
7	Yao Jie (NED)	11	11
26	Jiang Yanmei (SIN)	6	8
23	Wang Chen (HKG)	11	11
10	Lorena Blanco (PER)	1	4
15	Kelly Morgan (GBR)	11	11
18	Lenny Permana (AUS)	5	3
31	Zhang Ning (CHN)	4	11	11
2	Marina Andrievskaya (SWE)	11	3	7

Round of 16
Gong (CHN)	11	11
Ponsana (THA)	8	3
Jun (KOR)	11	6	4
Cheng (TPE)	3	11	11
Audina (NED)	9	11	11
Popat (IND)	11	1	3
Martin (DEN)	2	11	10
Hallam (GBR)	11	5	13
Nedelcheva (BUL)	7	11	11
Seo (KOR)	11	5	8
Mori (JPN)	2	4
Zhou (CHN)	11	11
Yao (NED)	11	10	8
Wang (HKG)	8	13	11
Morgan (GBR)	6	8
Zhang (CHN)	11	11

Quarterfinals
Gong (CHN)	11	11
Cheng (TPE)	3	3
Audina (NED)	11	11
Hallam (GBR)	0	9
Nedelcheva (BUL)	4	1
Zhou (CHN)	11	11
Wang (HKG)	11	6	7
Zhang (CHN)	9	11	11

Semifinals
Gong (CHN)	4	2
Audina (NED)	11	11
Zhou (CHN)	6	4
Zhang (CHN)	11	11

Final
Audina (NED)	11	6	7
Zhang (CHN)	8	11	11

== Bronze-medal match ==
Bronze-medal match
1	Gong Ruina (CHN)	2	11	6
2	Zhou Mi (CHN)	11	8	11
