= 2003 IBF World Championships – Women's singles =

Badminton championships

Women's singles at the 2003 IBF World Championships
- Venue: National Indoor Arena
- Location: Birmingham, United Kingdom
- Dates: July 28, 2003 – August 3, 2003

Medalists
gold medal	Zhang Ning	China
silver medal	Gong Ruina	China
bronze medal	Zhou Mi	China
bronze medal	Mia Audina	Netherlands

The 2003 IBF World Championships (World Badminton Championships) took place in the National Indoor Arena in Birmingham, England, between July 28 and August 3, 2003. Following the results in the women's singles.

== Seeds ==
1. (Hong Kong) Wang Chen
2. (China) Zhang Ning
3. (Netherlands) Mia Audina Tjiptawan
4. (China) Gong Ruina
5. (China) Zhou Mi
6. (China) Xie Xingfang
7. (Denmark) Camilla Martin
8. (Japan) Kanako Yonekura
9. (Netherlands) Karina de Wit
10. (South Korea) Kim Kyeung-Ran
11. (Germany) Petra Overzier
12. (Netherlands) Judith Meulendijks

== Main stage ==
=== Section 1 ===
First round
(China) Zhang Ning	11	11
(Russia) Ekaterina Ananina	1	4
(Italy) Agnese Allegrini	11	11
(Bulgaria) Diana Dimova	0	9
(India) Aparna Popat	13	11
(Hong Kong) Ling Wan Ting	10	8
(South Korea) Kim Kyeung Ran	13	11
(Sweden) Sara Persson	11	4
(Denmark) Camilla Martin	11	11
(France) Tatiana Vattier	3	1
(Indonesia) Yuli Marfuah	13	8	13
(Austria) Maja Tvrdy	10	11	10
(Finland) Anu Weckström	11	11
(Austria) Simone Prutsch	1	0
(Chinese Taipei) Chien Yu-Chin	11	11
(England) Julia Mann	3	4

Second round
(China) Zhang Ning	11	11
(Italy) Agnese Allegrini	4	6
(India) Aparna Popat	11	11
(South Korea) Kim Kyeung Ran	9	0
(Denmark) Camilla Martin	11	11
(Indonesia) Yuli Marfuah	4	3
(Finland) Anu Weckström	11	11
(Chinese Taipei) Chien Yu-Chin	3	3

Third round
(China) Zhang Ning	11	11
(India) Aparna Popat	4	5
(Denmark) Camilla Martin	11	11
(Finland) Anu Weckström	3	3

Quarterfinals
(China) Zhang Ning	11	11
(Denmark) Camilla Martin	6	0

=== Section 2 ===
First round
(Netherlands) Mia Audina	11	11
(Czech Republic) Hana Procházková	0	1
(Hong Kong) Louisa Koon Wai Chee	11	11
(Nigeria) Grace Daniel	2	2
(Germany) Petra Overzier	11	11
(Canada) Charmaine Reid	4	4
(Wales) Yuan Wemyss	11	11
(Peru) Lorena Blanco	1	2
(Japan) Kanako Yonekura	11	11
(England) Jill Pittard	5	4
(Germany) Nicole Grether	11	11
(Wales) Harriet Johnson	0	4
(Netherlands) Judith Meulendijks	11	11
(Iceland) Ragna Ingolfsdottir	2	4
(Singapore) Li Li	11	11
(United States) Mesinee Mangkalakiri	2	1

Second round
(Netherlands) Mia Audina	11	11
(Hong Kong) Louisa Koon Wai Chee	8	6
(Germany) Petra Overzier	11	4	11
(Wales) Yuan Wemyss	3	11	3
(Japan) Kanako Yonekura	11	9	13
(Germany) Nicole Grether	1	11	11
(Netherlands) Judith Meulendijks	11	11
(Singapore) Li Li	3	4

Third round
(Netherlands) Mia Audina	11	11
(Germany) Petra Overzier	2	4
(Japan) Kanako Yonekura	11	11
(Netherlands) Judith Meulendijks	5	7

Quarterfinals
(Netherlands) Mia Audina	11	11
(Japan) Kanako Yonekura	5	0

=== Section 3 ===
First round
(China) Gong Ruina	11	11
(Greece) Chrisa Georgali	0	0
(Malaysia) Wong Mew Choo	11	11
(Finland) Nina Weckström	2	4
(Netherlands) Karina de Wit	13	8	11
(Canada) Denyse Julien	10	11	3
(Scotland) Susan Hughes	11	11
(Czech Republic) Markéta Koudelková	1	4
(China) Xie Xingfang	11	11
(Singapore) Xiao Luxi	2	9
(Denmark) Tine Rasmussen	2	11	11
(Bulgaria) Petya Nedeltcheva	11	8	4
(England) Tracey Hallam	1	11	11
(Japan) Miho Tanaka	11	2	4
(Germany) Juliane Schenk	4	11	11
(Indonesia) Diah Novita Sari	11	9	3

Second round
(China) Gong Ruina	11	11
(Malaysia) Wong Mew Choo	6	3
(Netherlands) Karina de Wit	11	11
(Scotland) Susan Hughes	5	9
(China) Xie Xingfang	11	11
(Denmark) Tine Rasmussen	2	9
(England) Tracey Hallam	11	11
(Germany) Juliane Schenk	8	2

Third round
(China) Gong Ruina	11	11
(Netherlands) Karina de Wit	5	2
(China) Xie Xingfang	11	11
(England) Tracey Hallam	1	0

Quarterfinals
(China) Gong Ruina	13	11
(China) Xie Xingfang	11	4

=== Section 4 ===
First round
(China) Zhou Mi	13	11
(Netherlands) Yao Jie	11	2
(Japan) Yuki Shimada	11	11
(Slovenia) Maja Pohar	2	1
(Japan) Kaori Mori	11	13
(Wales) Kelly Morgan	7	12
(India) Trupti Murgunde	9	11	11
(Spain) Dolores Marco	11	4	9
(Hong Kong) Wang Chen
bye
(Russia) Elena Sukhareva	11	11
(United States) Eva Lee	6	3
(South Korea) Jun Jae Youn	6	11	11
(Sweden) Marina Andrievskaya	3	8
(Chinese Taipei) Huang Chia-Chi	11	11
(Switzerland) Santi Wibowo	0	2

Second round
(China) Zhou Mi	9	11	11
(Japan) Yuki Shimada	11	5	3
(Japan) Kaori Mori	11	11
(India) Trupti Murgunde	6	0
(Hong Kong) Wang Chen	11	11
(Russia) Elena Sukhareva	8	5
(South Korea) Jun Jae Youn	5	11	11
(Chinese Taipei) Huang Chia-Chi	11	1	8

Third round
(China) Zhou Mi	11	11
(Japan) Kaori Mori	5	6
(Hong Kong) Wang Chen	11	11
(South Korea) Jun Jae Youn	1	8

Quarterfinals
(China) Zhou Mi	11	5	11
(Hong Kong) Wang Chen	6	11	4

== Final stage ==
Quarterfinals
(China) Zhang Ning	11	11
(Denmark) Camilla Martin	6	0
(Netherlands) Mia Audina	11	11
(Japan) Kanako Yonekura	5	0
(China) Gong Ruina	13	11
(China) Xie Xingfang	11	4
(China) Zhou Mi	11	5	11
(Hong Kong) Wang Chen	6	11	4

Semifinals
(China) Zhang Ning	11	11
(Netherlands) Mia Audina	7	0
(China) Gong Ruina	11	11
(China) Zhou Mi	2	4

Finals
(China) Zhang Ning	11	11
(China) Gong Ruina	6	3
