= 2008 All England Super Series =

Badminton championships

Tournament details
- Dates: March 4, 2008 - March 9, 2008
- Edition: 98th
- Total prize money: US$200,000
- Venue: National Indoor Arena
- Location: Birmingham, England

The 2008 Yonex All England Super Series is the 98th edition of the All England Open Badminton Championships and also the third tournament of the 2008 BWF Super Series. It was held from 4 to 9 March 2008 in Birmingham, England.

== Finals ==
Category	Winners	Runners-up	Score
Men's singles	(China) Chen Jin	(China) Lin Dan	22–20, 25–23
Women's singles	(Denmark) Tine Rasmussen	(China) Lu Lan	21–11, 18–21, 22–20
Men's doubles	(South Korea) Jung Jae-sung & Lee Yong-dae	(South Korea) Hwang Ji-man & Lee Jae-jin	20–22, 21–19, 21–18
Women's doubles	(South Korea) Lee Hyo-jung & Lee Kyung-won	(China) Du Jing & Yu Yang	12–21, 21–18, 21–14
Mixed doubles	(China) Zheng Bo & Gao Ling	(Indonesia) Nova Widianto & Lilyana Natsir	18–21, 21–14, 21–9

== Men's singles ==
=== Seeds ===
1. (China) Lin Dan
2. (Malaysia) Lee Chong Wei
3. (China) Bao Chunlai
4. (China) Chen Jin
5. (Denmark) Kenneth Jonassen
6. (Indonesia) Sony Dwi Kuncoro
7. (Indonesia) Taufik Hidayat
8. (Denmark) Peter Gade

=== Section 1 ===
Round of 32
(China) Chen Jin	21	21
(Japan) Kenichi Tago	16	12
(Poland) Przemysław Wacha	21	21
(Malaysia) Choong Hann Wong	12	14
(Indonesia) Sony Dwi Kuncoro	11	21	21
(Indonesia) Andre Kurniawan Tedjono	21	12	9
(Japan) Shōji Satō	14	22	21
(Thailand) Boonsak Ponsana	21	20	15
(Malaysia) Lee Chong Wei	21	21
(Malaysia) Sairul Amar Ayob	16	14
(Indonesia) Tommy Sugiarto	21	21
(England) Andrew Smith	11	19
(Indonesia) Taufik Hidayat	21	21
(Canada) Andrew Dabeka	18	12
(Vietnam) Nguyễn Tiến Minh	23	21
(Hong Kong) Ng Wei	21	15

Round of 16
(China) Chen Jin	21	21
(Poland) Wacha	17	9
(Indonesia) Kuncoro	17	21	21
(Japan) Satō	21	9	16
(Malaysia) Chong Wei	21	21
(Indonesia) Sugiarto	18	11
(Indonesia) Hidayat	21	15	21
(Vietnam) Tiến Minh	17	21	19

Quarter-finals
(China) Chen Jin	21	21
(Indonesia) Kuncoro	14	12
(Malaysia) Chong Wei	23	21
(Indonesia) Hidayat	21	17

Semi-finals
(China) Chen Jin	21	21
(Malaysia) Chong Wei	18	18

=== Section 2 ===
Round of 32
(China) Lin Dan	16	21	21
(India) Anup Sridhar	21	8	11
(Netherlands) Eric Pang	10	22	21
(Malaysia) Lee Tsuen Seng	21	20	15
(Denmark) Kenneth Jonassen	21	21
(Hong Kong) Chan Yan Kit	18	15
(Japan) Sho Sasaki	21	21
(South Korea) Park Sung-hwan	13	19
(China) Bao Chunlai	21	21
(Malaysia) Muhammad Hafiz Hashim	19	11
(China) Chen Yu	19	21	21
(South Korea) Lee Hyun-il	21	19	14
(Denmark) Joachim Persson	21	17	21
(Malaysia) Muhammad Roslin Hashim	15	21	9
(China) Lü Yi	17	21	21
(Singapore) Kendrick Lee Yen Hui	21	19	14

Round of 16
(China) Lin Dan	21	21
(Netherlands) Pang	9	12
(Denmark) Jonassen	13	22	21
(Japan) Sasaki	21	20	12
(China) Chunlai	21	10	21
(China) Chen Yu	11	21	18
(Denmark) Persson	21	21
(China) Lü Yi	15	18

Quarter-finals
(China) Lin Dan	21	21
(Denmark) Jonassen	17	11
(China) Chunlai	21	21
(Denmark) Persson	11	13

Semi-finals
(China) Lin Dan	21	21
(China) Chunlai	14	14

== Women's singles ==
=== Seeds ===
1. (China) Xie Xingfang
2. (China) Zhang Ning
3. (China) Lu Lan
4. (China) Zhu Lin
5. (Hong Kong) Wang Chen
6. (France) Pi Hongyan
7. (Germany) Xu Huaiwen
8. (Malaysia) Wong Mew Choo

=== Section 1 ===
Round of 32
(Denmark) Tine Rasmussen	21	21
(Japan) Kanako Yonekura	19	13
(China) Zhu Lin	22	21
(Japan) Kaori Mori	20	9
(France) Pi Hongyan	21	21
(Bulgaria) Petya Nedelcheva	16	10
(Canada) Anna Rice	21	17	21
(England) Jill Pittard	12	21	15
(South Korea) Hwang Hye-youn	21	16	25
(Japan) Eriko Hirose	18	21	23
(Hong Kong) Yip Pui Yin	22	21
(China) Xie Xingfang	20	19
(Malaysia) Wong Mew Choo	21	21
(Indonesia) Maria Kristin Yulianti	13	15
(China) Jiang Yanjiao	21	21
(England) Elizabeth Cann	16	12

Round of 16
(Denmark) Rasmussen	21	21
(China) Zhu Lin	14	15
(France) Hongyan	21	22
(Canada) Rice	7	20
(South Korea) Hye-Youn	21	23
(Hong Kong) Yip Pui Yin	15	21
(Malaysia) Wong	22	23
(China) Yanjiao	20	21

Quarter-finals
(Denmark) Rasmussen	20	21	21
(France) Hongyan	22	18	18
(South Korea) Hye-Youn	17	21	21
(Malaysia) Wong	21	10	13

Semi-finals
(Denmark) Rasmussen	21	21
(South Korea) Hye-Youn	17	18

=== Section 2 ===
Round of 32
(China) Lu Lan	21	21
(Indonesia) Adriyanti Firdasari	14	13
(China) Wang Yihan	21	21
(Russia) Ella Diehl	14	18
(Hong Kong) Wang Chen	21	21
(Singapore) Xing Aiying	12	11
(Chinese Taipei) Cheng Shao-chieh	24	21
(Indonesia) Pia Zebadiah Bernadeth	22	10
(Germany) Xu Huaiwen	21	21
(China) Zhou Mi	16	13
(South Korea) Jun Jae-youn	21	15	21
(Netherlands) Judith Meulendijks	11	21	17
(Japan) Yu Hirayama	21	18	21
(India) Saina Nehwal	18	21	18
(Netherlands) Yao Jie	21	19	21
(China) Zhang Ning	15	21	19

Round of 16
(China) Lu Lan	w/o
(China) Yihan	scr
(Hong Kong) Wang Chen	21	14	21
(Chinese Taipei) Shao-chieh	17	21	18
(Germany) Huaiwen	21	21
(South Korea) Jun	13	14
(Japan) Hirayama	21	21
(Netherlands) Yao Jie	17	17

Quarter-finals
(China) Lu Lan	21	21
(Hong Kong) Wang Chen	18	13
(Germany) Huaiwen	18	21	21
(Japan) Hirayama	21	18	16

Semi-finals
(China) Lu Lan	21	21
(Germany) Huaiwen	13	14

== Doubles ==
=== Seeds ===
Men's doubles

1. (China) Fu Haifeng / Cai Yun
2. (Indonesia) Markis Kido / Hendra Setiawan
3. (Malaysia) Koo Kien Keat / Tan Boon Heong
4. (Malaysia) Choong Tan Fook / Lee Wan Wah
5. (Indonesia) Candra Wijaya / (United States) Tony Gunawan
6. (South Korea) Jung Jae-sung / Lee Yong-dae
7. (Denmark) Jens Eriksen / Martin Lundgaard Hansen
8. (Indonesia) Luluk Hadiyanto / Alvent Yulianto

Women's doubles

1. (China) Zhang Yawen / Wei Yili
2. (China) Yang Wei / Zhang Jiewen
3. (China) Du Jing / Yu Yang
4. (South Korea) Lee Kyung-won / Lee Hyo-jung
5. (China) Gao Ling / Zhao Tingting
6. (Chinese Taipei) Chien Yu Chin / Cheng Wen-Hsing
7. (Japan) Kumiko Ogura / Reiko Shiota
8. (England) Gail Emms / Donna Kellogg

Mixed doubles

1. (China) Zheng Bo / Gao Ling
2. (Indonesia) Nova Widianto / Lilyana Natsir
3. (Indonesia) Flandy Limpele / Vita Marissa
4. (China) Xie Zhongbo / Zhang Yawen
5. (China) He Hanbin / Yu Yang
6. (South Korea) Lee Yong-dae / Lee Hyo-jung
7. (Thailand) Sudket Prapakamol / Saralee Thungthongkam
8. (England) Nathan Robertson / Gail Emms

=== Semi-finals ===
Category	Winners	Losers	Score
Men's doubles	(South Korea) Hwang Ji-man & Lee Jae-jin	(Japan) Shintaro Ikeda & Shuichi Sakamoto	21–16, 21–16
Men's doubles	(South Korea) Jung Jae-sung & Lee Yong-dae	(Malaysia) Choong Tan Fook & Lee Wan Wah	21–13, 22–24, 23–21
Women's doubles	(China) Du Jing & Yu Yang	(China) Wei Yili & Zhang Yawen	21–16, 21–9
Women's doubles	(South Korea) Lee Hyo-jung & Lee Kyung-won	(China) Yang Wei & Zhang Jiewen	13–21, 21–13, 21–19
Mixed doubles	(China) Zheng Bo & Gao Ling	(China) Xie Zhongbo & Zhang Yawen	16–21, 21–6, retired
Mixed doubles	(Indonesia) Nova Widianto & Lilyana Natsir	(England) Nathan Robertson & Gail Emms	21–18, 21–15
