= 2007 BWF World Championships – Women's singles =

Badminton championships

Women's singles at the 2007 BWF World Championships
- Venue: Putra Indoor Stadium
- Location: Kuala Lumpur, Malaysia
- Dates: August 13, 2007 – August 19, 2007

Medalists
gold medal	Zhu Lin	China
silver medal	Wang Chen	Hong Kong
bronze medal	Lu Lan	China
bronze medal	Zhang Ning	China

This article list the results of women's singles category in the 2007 BWF World Championships (World Badminton Championships).

== Seeds ==
1. (China) Zhang Ning (semi-finals)
2. (China) Xie Xingfang (third round)
3. (Germany) Huaiwen Xu (quarter-finals)
4. (France) Pi Hongyan (quarter-finals)
5. (China) Zhu Lin (world champion)
6. (Hong Kong) Wang Chen (final)
7. (China) Lu Lan (semi-finals)
8. (Netherlands) Yao Jie (second round)

9. (Bulgaria) Petya Nedelcheva (third round)
10. (Malaysia) Wong Mew Choo (quarter-finals)
11. (Hong Kong) Yip Pui Yin (third round)
12. (Denmark) Tine Rasmussen (third round)
13. (Germany) Juliane Schenk (second round)
14. (Japan) Kaori Mori (third round)
15. (Indonesia) Maria Kristin Yulianti (third round)
16. (England) Tracey Hallam (quarter-finals)

Click on the seed number of a player to go to their draw section.

== Draw ==
=== Finals ===
Semi-finals
1	(China) Zhang Ning	11	15
6	(Hong Kong) Wang Chen	21	21
7	(China) Lu Lan	10	13
5	(China) Zhu Lin	21	21

Final
6	(Hong Kong) Wang Chen	8	12
5	(China) Zhu Lin	21	21

=== Top half ===
==== Section 1 ====
First Round
(South Korea) Jang S-y	21	21
(Austria) M Gruber	5	9
15	(Indonesia) M K Yulianti	21	21
(Slovenia) M Kersnik	8	9
(Malaysia) J Wong P X	21	21
(Bulgaria) L Zetchiri	8	16
(Russia) E Karachkova	21	10	21
(Finland) A Nieminen	14	21	12
16	(England) T Hallam	21	19	21
(Malaysia) L Cheah	16	21	11
(Poland) K Augustyn	21	21
(Ukraine) E Prus	13	12

Second Round
1	(China) Zhang N	21	21
(South Korea) Jang S-y	9	14
15	(Indonesia) M K Yulianti	16	21	21
(Malaysia) J Wong P X	21	14	18
8	(Netherlands) Yao J	20	21	17
(Russia) E Karachkova	22	14	21
16	(England) T Hallam	15	21	21
(Poland) K Augustyn	21	16	11

Third Round
1	(China) Zhang N	21	21
15	(Indonesia) M K Yulianti	10	9
(Russia) E Karachkova	23	15	19
16	(England) T Hallam	21	21	21

Quarter-finals
1	(China) Zhang N	21	21
16	(England) T Hallam	11	9

==== Section 2 ====
First Round
(Canada) C Reid	21	21
(Portugal) F Lamy	15	14
13	(Germany) J Schenk	21	21
(Czech Republic) K Ludíková	16	10
(India) S Nehwal	21	21
(Switzerland) J Cicognini	12	12
6	(Hong Kong) Wang C	21	21
(Spain) L Tavera	2	11
(Republic of Ireland) C Magee	11	6
(Singapore) Li L	21	21
12	(Denmark) T Rasmussen	21	21
(Italy) A Allegrini	16	10
(Peru) C Rivero	21	21
(United States) S Pohl	11	9

Second Round
4	(France) Pi HY	21	21
(Canada) C Reid	13	12
13	(Germany) J Schenk	16	10
(India) S Nehwal	21	21
6	(Hong Kong) Wang C	21	21
(Singapore) Li L	13	6
12	(Denmark) T Rasmussen	21	21
(Peru) C Rivero	5	6

Third Round
4	(France) Pi HY	21	21
(India) S Nehwal	13	17
6	(Hong Kong) Wang C	21	21
12	(Denmark) T Rasmussen	13	15

Quarter-finals
4	(France) Pi HY	15	8
6	(Hong Kong) Wang C	21	21

=== Bottom half ===
==== Section 3 ====
First Round
(Czech Republic) M Benešová	15	14
(United States) E Lee	21	21
(France) W Rahmawati	18	8
9	(Bulgaria) P Nedelcheva	21	21
(South Korea) Hwang H-y	10	12
(Netherlands) J Meulendijks	21	21
(Singapore) Xing AY	9	15
7	(China) Lu L	21	21
(Ukraine) L Griga	21	21
(Slovakia) E Sládeková	10	5
(England) J Pittard	13	16
14	(Japan) K Mori	21	21
(Slovenia) M Tvrdy	22	12	6
(Indonesia) A Firdasari	20	21	21

Second Round
(United States) E Lee	13	11
9	(Bulgaria) P Nedelcheva	21	21
(Netherlands) J Meulendijks	18	13
7	(China) Lu L	21	21
(Ukraine) L Griga	21	14	15
14	(Japan) K Mori	18	21	21
(Indonesia) A Firdasari	17	20
3	(Germany) HW Xu	21	22

Third Round
9	(Bulgaria) P Nedelcheva	17	12
7	(China) Lu L	21	21
14	(Japan) K Mori	16	21	5
3	(Germany) HW Xu	21	19	21

Quarter-finals
7	(China) Lu L	21	12	21
3	(Germany) HW Xu	9	21	16

==== Section 4 ====
First Round
(New Zealand) R Hindley	22	21
(Iceland) R Ingólfsdóttir	20	17
(India) T Murgunde	17	13
11	(Hong Kong) Yip P Y	21	21
(Canada) A Rice	21	21
(Estonia) R Tolmoff	14	14
(Scotland) S Hughes	7	14
5	(China) Zhu L	21	21
(Mauritius) K Foo Kune	4	9
(Russia) E Ananina	21	21
(Austria) S Prutsch	10	9
10	(Malaysia) Wong M C	21	21
(Spain) Y Martínez	21	11	9
(Portugal) A Moura	18	21	21

Second Round
(New Zealand) R Hindley	10	0^{r}
11	(Hong Kong) Yip P Y	21	0
(Canada) A Rice	18	13
5	(China) Zhu L	21	21
(Russia) E Ananina	14	20
10	(Malaysia) Wong M C	21	22
(Portugal) A Moura	2	7
2	(China) Xie XF	21	21

Third Round
11	(Hong Kong) Yip YP	9	21	14
5	(China) Zhu L	21	16	21
10	(Malaysia) Wong M C	21	21
2	(China) Xie XF	10	8

Quarter-finals
5	(China) Zhu L	21	13	21
10	(Malaysia) Wong M C	17	21	16

== Sources ==
- Tournamentsoftware.com: 2007 World Championships - Women's singles
