= 2005 IBF World Championships – Women's singles =

Badminton championships

Women's singles at the 2005 IBF World Championships
- Venue: Arrowhead Pond
- Location: Anaheim, United States
- Dates: August 15, 2005 – August 21, 2005

Medalists
gold medal	Xie Xingfang	China
silver medal	Zhang Ning	China
bronze medal	Xu Huaiwen	Germany
bronze medal	Cheng Shao-chieh	Chinese Taipei

The 2005 IBF World Championships (World Badminton Championships) took place in Arrowhead Pond in Anaheim, United States, between August 15 and August 21, 2005. Following the results in the women's singles.

== Seeds ==
1. (China) Zhang Ning, Runner-up
2. (China) Xie Xingfang, Champion
3. (France) Pi Hongyan, Quarter-final
4. (Hong Kong) Wang Chen, Quarter-final
5. (Netherlands) Yao Jie, Third round
6. (Germany) Xu Huaiwen, Semi-final
7. (England) Tracey Hallam, Quarter-final
8. (China) Zhou Mi, First round
9. (Japan) Eriko Hirose, Third round
10. (Bulgaria) Petya Nedeltcheva, First round
11. (Japan) Kanako Yonekura, Second round
12. (Japan) Kaori Mori, Quarter-final
13. (Netherlands) Mia Audina Tjiptawan, Third round
14. (Thailand) Salakjit Ponsana, Third round
15. (Singapore) Xing Aiying, First round
16. (Singapore) Li Li, Third round

== Main stage ==
=== Section 1 ===
First round
(China) Zhang Ning
Bye
(Chinese Taipei) Huang Chia-Hsin	5	11	13
(Italy) Hui Ding	11	1	10
(Japan) Kanako Yonekura	11	11
(Czech Republic) Markéta Koudelková	2	0
(Hong Kong) Yip Pui Yin	11	11
(Spain) Laura Molina	1	0
(Netherlands) Yao Jie
Bye
(Canada) Charmaine Reid	11	11
(Slovenia) Maja Tvrdy	6	1
(Japan) Kaori Mori	11	11
(Bulgaria) Linda Zechiri	3	0
(Estonia) Kati Tolmoff	10	13	11
(United States) Eva Lee	13	11	1

Second round
(China) Zhang Ning	11	11
(Chinese Taipei) Huang Chia-Hsin	6	2
(Japan) Kanako Yonekura	11	12	9
(Hong Kong) Yip Pui Yin	8	13	11
(Netherlands) Yao Jie	11	11
(Canada) Charmaine Reid	1	6
(Japan) Kaori Mori	11	11
(Estonia) Kati Tolmoff	2	3

Third round
(China) Zhang Ning	4	11	11
(Hong Kong) Yip Pui Yin	11	3	4
(Netherlands) Yao Jie	3	13	8
(Japan) Kaori Mori	11	11	11

Quarterfinals
(China) Zhang Ning	11	11
(Japan) Kaori Mori	4	6

=== Section 2 ===
First round
(France) Pi Hongyan
Bye
(Ukraine) Elena Nozdran	11	11
(Peru) Cristina Aicardi	4	2
(Singapore) Li Li	11	7	11
(Scotland) Susan Hughes	3	11	4
(Malaysia) Sutheaswari Mudukasan	11	11
(Finland) Nina Weckström	4	3
(Germany) Xu Huaiwen	11	11
(Austria) Simone Prutsch	4	8
(Belgium) Nathalie Descamps	11	9	11
(New Zealand) Rachel Hindley	4	11	9
(Thailand) Salakjit Ponsana	11	11
(South Korea) Hwang Hye-youn	7	1
(Republic of Ireland) Clare Flood	0	0
(Russia) Ella Karachkova	11	11

Second round
(France) Pi Hongyan	11	11
(Ukraine) Elena Nozdran	6	0
(Singapore) Li Li	11	11
(Malaysia) Sutheaswari Mudukasan	6	3
(Germany) Xu Huaiwen	11	11
(Belgium) Nathalie Descamps	2	4
(Thailand) Salakjit Ponsana	11	11
(Russia) Ella Karachkova	4	6

Third round
(France) Pi Hongyan	13	11
(Singapore) Li Li	12	8
5	(Germany) Xu Huaiwen	11	13
(Thailand) Salakjit Ponsana	5	12

Quarterfinals
5	(France) Pi Hongyan	3	2
(Germany) Xu Huaiwen	11	11

=== Section 3 ===
First round
(Chinese Taipei) Cheng Shao-Chieh	11	11	11
(Russia) Anna Larchenko	3	13	4
(Malaysia) Wong Mew Choo	11	11
(Singapore) Xing Aiying	8	8
(United States) Shannon Pohl	9	13	11
(South Africa) Michelle Edwards	11	10	5
(Germany) Juliane Schenk	11	11
(Hong Kong) Zhou Mi	2	9
(Sweden) Sara Persson	11	11
(Switzerland) Jeanine Cicognini	5	4
(Hong Kong) Wang Chen
Bye
(Italy) Agnese Allegrini	4	11	11
(France) Tatiana Vattier	11	3	1
(United States) Lili Zhou	5	9
(Japan) Eriko Hirose	11	11

Second round
(Chinese Taipei) Cheng Shao-Chieh	7	13	11
(Malaysia) Wong Mew Choo	11	12	3
(United States) Shannon Pohl	2	0
(Germany) Juliane Schenk	11	11
(Sweden) Sara Persson	0	1
(Hong Kong) Wang Chen	11	11
(Italy) Agnese Allegrini	3	4
(Japan) Eriko Hirose	11	11

Third round
(Chinese Taipei) Cheng Shao-Chieh	11	11
(Germany) Juliane Schenk	3	8
5	(Hong Kong) Wang Chen	11	11
(Japan) Eriko Hirose	1	0

Quarterfinals
5	(Chinese Taipei) Cheng Shao-Chieh	11	5	11
(Hong Kong) Wang Chen	5	11	6

=== Section 4 ===
First round
(New Zealand) Rebecca Bellingham	13	11
(Iceland) Ragna Ingolfsdottir	11	4
(India) Aparna Popat	11	11
(Bulgaria) Petya Nedeltcheva	6	9
(Canada) Anna Rice	11	11
(Peru) Claudia Rivero	0	3
(England) Tracey Hallam
Bye
(Slovenia) Maja Kersnik	11	11
(Spain) Lucia Tavera	6	5
(Netherlands) Mia Audina	11	11
(Estonia) Helen Reino	0	1
(China) Xie Xingfang
Bye
(Finland) Anu Nieminen	4	5
(Ukraine) Larisa Griga	11	11

Second round
(New Zealand) Rebecca Bellingham	9	11	11
(India) Aparna Popat	11	8	9
(Canada) Anna Rice	10	3
(England) Tracey Hallam	13	11
(Slovenia) Maja Kersnik	0	2
(Netherlands) Mia Audina	11	11
(China) Xie Xingfang	13	11
(Ukraine) Larisa Griga	12	2

Third round
(New Zealand) Rebecca Bellingham	7	10
(England) Tracey Hallam	11	13
5	(Netherlands) Mia Audina	4	13	8
(China) Xie Xingfang	11	11	11

Quarterfinals
5	(England) Tracey Hallam	3	1
(China) Xie Xingfang	11	11

== Final stage ==
Quarterfinals
1	(China) Zhang Ning	11	11
9/16	(Japan) Kaori Mori	4	6
3/4	(France) Pi Hongyan	3	2
5/8	(Germany) Xu Huaiwen	11	11
(Chinese Taipei) Cheng Shao-Chieh	11	5	11
3/4	(Hong Kong) Wang Chen	9	11	6
5/8	(England) Tracey Hallam	3	1
2	(China) Xie Xingfang	11	11

Semifinals
(China) Zhang Ning	11	11
(Germany) Xu Huaiwen	7	9
(Chinese Taipei) Cheng Shao-Chieh	11	5	6
(China) Xie Xingfang	2	11	11

Finals
(China) Zhang Ning	8	11	3
(China) Xie Xingfang	11	9	11
