= 2001 IBF World Championships – Women's singles =

Badminton championships

Women's singles at the 2001 IBF World Championships
- Venue: Palacio de Deportes de San Pablo
- Location: Seville, Spain
- Dates: June 3, 2001 – June 10, 2001

Medalists
gold medal	Gong Ruina	China
silver medal	Zhou Mi	China
bronze medal	Gong Zhichao	China
bronze medal	Zhang Ning	China

The 2001 IBF World Championships, also known as the World Badminton Championships, were held in the Palacio de Deportes de San Pablo, Seville, Spain, between 3 June and 10 June 2001. Following the results of the women's singles.

== Seeds ==
1. (Denmark) Camilla Martin
2. (China) Zhou Mi
3. (China) Gong Ruina
4. (Sweden) Marina Andrievskaya
5. (China) Gong Zhichao
6. (England) Julia Mann
7. (Netherlands) Mia Audina Tjiptawan
8. (China) Zhang Ning
9. (Wales) Kelly Morgan
10. (Netherlands) Judith Meulendijks
11. (China) Wang Chen
12. (Japan) Kanako Yonekura
13. (Hong Kong) Ling Wan Ting
14. (China) Dai Yun
15. (Denmark) Mette Sørensen
16. (Japan) Kaori Mori

== Main stage ==
=== Section 1 ===
First round
(China) Gong Ruina	11	11
(Poland) Katarzyna Krasowska	2	3
(Malaysia) Wong Miew Kheng	11	11
(Sweden) Sara Persson	2	3
(Denmark) Tine Rasmussen	11	8	11
(Finland) Anu Weckström	6	11	5
(Wales) Kelly Morgan	11	11
(Hong Kong) Louisa Koon Wai Chee	2	8
(Indonesia) Mia Audina	11	11
(Spain) Dolores Marco	0	0
(Ukraine) Elena Nozdran	11	11
(Peru) Lorena Blanco	4	4
(Japan) Kaori Mori	11	11
(Germany) Petra Overzier	2	3
(England) Tracey Hallam	11	11
(Chinese Taipei) Chien Yu-Chin	6	6

Second round
(China) Gong Ruina	13	11
(Malaysia) Wong Miew Kheng	10	2
(Denmark) Tine Rasmussen	6	11	11
(Wales) Kelly Morgan	11	6	6
(Indonesia) Mia Audina	11	11
(Ukraine) Elena Nozdran	3	3
(Japan) Kaori Mori	11	11
(England) Tracey Hallam	3	3

Third round
(China) Gong Ruina	11	11
(Denmark) Tine Rasmussen	1	1
(Indonesia) Mia Audina	11	11
(Japan) Kaori Mori	6	4

Quarterfinals
(China) Gong Ruina	6	11	11
(Indonesia) Mia Audina	11	8	8

=== Section 2 ===
First round
(China) Gong Zhichao	11	11
(Thailand) Sujitra Ekmongkolpaisarn	3	1
(Japan) Kyoko Komuro	11	11
(Peru) Ximena Bellido	2	1
(China) Wang Chen	11	11
(New Zealand) Rhona Robertson	5	3
(Netherlands) Brenda Beenhakker	11	11
(England) Elizabeth Cann	2	1
(China) Dai Yun	11	11
(Germany) Katja Michalowsky	0	0
(Indonesia) Lidya Djaelawijaya	11	11
(Slovenia) Maja Pohar	4	5
(Denmark) Camilla Martin	11	11
(South Korea) Jun Jae Youn	4	6
(Bulgaria) Neli Boteva	11	5	13
(Switzerland) Santi Wibowo	2	11	12

Second round
(China) Gong Zhichao	11	11
(Japan) Kyoko Komuro	1	6
(China) Wang Chen	11	11
(Netherlands) Brenda Beenhakker	7	1
(China) Dai Yun	8	11	11
(Indonesia) Lidya Djaelawijaya	11	0	5
(Denmark) Camilla Martin	11	11
(Bulgaria) Neli Boteva	0	0

Third round
(China) Gong Zhichao	11	11
(China) Wang Chen	4	1
(China) Dai Yun	11	11
(Denmark) Camilla Martin	6	6

Quarterfinals
(China) Gong Zhichao	11	11
(China) Dai Yun	3	2

=== Section 3 ===
First round
(China) Zhou Mi	11	11
(Chinese Taipei) Chan Ya-Lin	8	4
(Malaysia) Ng Mee Fen	11	11
(Austria) Simone Prutsch	5	2
(Hong Kong) Ling Wan Ting	11	11
(South Korea) Seo Yoon Hee	9	6
(Germany) Nicole Grether	11	11
(Spain) Yoana Martinez	1	4
(Denmark) Mette Sørensen	2	11	11
(Netherlands) Karina de Wit	11	9	2
(Japan) Fumi Iwawaki	11	11
(Czech Republic) Markéta Koudelková	9	2
(England) Julia Mann	6	11	11
(Indonesia) Yuli Marfuah	11	7	7
(Bulgaria) Petya Nedeltcheva	11	11
(Finland) Nina Weckström	3	2

Second round
(China) Zhou Mi	11	11
(Malaysia) Ng Mee Fen	0	4
(Hong Kong) Ling Wan Ting	11	13
(Germany) Nicole Grether	8	10
(Denmark) Mette Sørensen	11	11
(Japan) Fumi Iwawaki	1	0
(England) Julia Mann	11	11
(Bulgaria) Petya Nedeltcheva	1	2

Third round
(China) Zhou Mi	11	11
(Hong Kong) Ling Wan Ting	4	1
(Denmark) Mette Sørensen	11	11
(England) Julia Mann	4	3

Quarterfinals
(China) Zhou Mi	11	11
(Denmark) Mette Sørensen	3	2

=== Section 4 ===
First round
(China) Zhang Ning	11	11
(Germany) Juliane Schenk	2	0
(South Korea) Lee Kyung Won	11	11
(Peru) Doriana Rivera	1	2
(Netherlands) Judith Meulendijks	11	11
(Russia) Ella Karachkova	4	4
(England) Rebecca Pantaney	4	11	11
(Scotland) Susan Hughes	11	5	7
(Japan) Kanako Yonekura	11	11
(China) Xiao Luxi	4	7
(United States) Cindy Shi	11	11
(Estonia) Kati Tolmoff	5	3
(China) Liu Zhen	11	9	11
(Singapore) Jiang Yanmei	1	11	3
(Sweden) Marina Andrievskaya	11	11
(India) Manjusha Kanwar	3	3

Second round
(China) Zhang Ning	11	11
(South Korea) Lee Kyung Won	0	1
(Netherlands) Judith Meulendijks	11	11
(England) Rebecca Pantaney	3	0
(Japan) Kanako Yonekura	5	13	11
(United States) Cindy Shi	11	10	7
(China) Liu Zhen	6	11	11
(Sweden) Marina Andrievskaya	11	2	8

Third round
(China) Zhang Ning	11	11
(Netherlands) Judith Meulendijks	2	9
(Japan) Kanako Yonekura	11	11
(China) Liu Zhen	3	8

Quarterfinals
(China) Zhang Ning	3	11	11
(Japan) Kanako Yonekura	11	1	0

== Final stage ==
Quarterfinals
(China) Gong Ruina	6	11	11
(Indonesia) Mia Audina	11	8	8
(China) Gong Zhichao	11	11
(China) Dai Yun	3	2
(China) Zhou Mi	11	11
(Denmark) Mette Sørensen	3	2
(China) Zhang Ning	3	11	11
(Japan) Kanako Yonekura	11	1	0

Semifinals
(China) Gong Ruina	13	11
(China) Gong Zhichao	10	4
(China) Zhou Mi	11	11
(China) Zhang Ning	5	9

Finals
(China) Gong Ruina	11	11
(China) Zhou Mi	9	4
