= 2007 Hong Kong Super Series =

Tournament details
- Dates: November 26, 2007 - December 2, 2007
- Total prize money: US$200,000
- Venue: Ma On Shan Sports Centre (Qualifying); Queen Elizabeth Stadium (Main tournament)
- Location: Ma On Shan (Qualifying); Wan Chai (Main tournament), Hong Kong

The 2007 Hong Kong Super Series is the last tournament of the 2007 BWF Super Series in badminton before the Super Series Final. It was held in Ma On Shan for qualifying tournament and Wan Chai for main tournament, in Hong Kong from 26 November to 2 December 2007.

== Men's singles ==
=== Seeds ===
1. (China) Lin Dan
2. (Malaysia) Lee Chong Wei
3. (China) Bao Chunlai
4. (China) Chen Jin
5. (Denmark) Peter Gade
6. (Indonesia) Taufik Hidayat
7. (Indonesia) Sony Dwi Kuncoro
8. (Denmark) Kenneth Jonassen

=== Results ===
1st round
1	(China) Lin Dan	21	21
(England) Andrew Smith	17	5
PFQ	(Chinese Taipei) Hsieh Yu-Hsin
(Japan) Shoji Sato	wo
6	(Indonesia) Taufik Hidayat	21	21
(China) Chen Hong	11	13
(South Korea) Park Sung-hwan	21	21
(Hong Kong) Ng Wei	17	18
4	(China) Chen Jin	19	21	21
PFQ	(Thailand) Poompat Sapkulchananart	21	12	11
(Netherlands) Dicky Palyama	18	12
Q4	(China) Gong Weijie	21	21
7	(Indonesia) Sony Dwi Kuncoro	21	21
(Thailand) Boonsak Ponsana	10	14
(Malaysia) Yeoh Kay Bin	22	25
Q1	(China) Lü Yi	20	23
(Malaysia) Muhammad Hafiz Hashim	21	21
(Indonesia) Simon Santoso	15	17
PFQ	(Vietnam) Nguyen Tien Minh	15	21
8	(Denmark) Kenneth Jonassen	21	23
PFQ	(South Korea) Lee Hyun-il	15	13
(Malaysia) Roslin Hashim	21	21
(Hong Kong) Chan Yan Kit	15	19
3	(China) Bao Chunlai	21	21
(Japan) Sho Sasaki	21	21
(Netherlands) Eric Pang	15	15
(Malaysia) Wong Choong Hann	14	14
5	(Denmark) Peter Gade	21	21
Q2	(China) Zhu Weilun	19	13
(Malaysia) Lee Tsuen Seng	21	21
Q3	(Malaysia) Kuan Beng Hong	13	11
2	(Malaysia) Lee Chong Wei	21	21

2nd round
(China) Lin Dan	21	21
(Japan) Shoji Sato	15	11
(Indonesia) Taufik Hidayat	21	21
(South Korea) Park Sung-hwan	12	19
(China) Chen Jin	21	21
(China) Gong Weijie	16	13
(Indonesia) Sony Dwi Kuncoro	21	21
(Malaysia) Yeoh Kay Bin	17	13
(Malaysia) Hafiz Hashim	19	5
(Denmark) Kenneth Jonassen	21	21
(Malaysia) Roslin Hashim	21
(China) Bao Chunlai	19	R
(Japan) Sho Sasaki	12	12
(Denmark) Peter Gade	21	21
(Malaysia) Lee Tsuen Seng	15	10
(Malaysia) Lee Chong Wei	21	21

Quarterfinals
(China) Lin Dan	21	21
(Indonesia) Taufik Hidayat	12	14
(China) Chen Jin	21	21
(Indonesia) Sony Dwi Kuncoro	8	6
(Denmark) Kenneth Jonassen	21	21
(Malaysia) Roslin Hashim	12	5
(Denmark) Peter Gade	17	20
(Malaysia) Lee Chong Wei	21	22

Semifinals
(China) Lin Dan	21	10
(China) Chen Jin	16	6
Finals
(China) Lin Dan	9	21	21
(Malaysia) Lee Chong Wei	21	15	15
(Denmark) Kenneth Jonassen	13	17
(Malaysia) Lee Chong Wei	21	21

== Women's singles ==
=== Seeds ===
1. (China) Xie Xingfang
2. (China) Zhang Ning
3. (China) Zhu Lin
4. (China) Lu Lan
5. (France) Pi Hongyan
6. (Hong Kong) Wang Chen
7. (Germany) Xu Huaiwen
8. (Malaysia) Wong Mew Choo

=== Results ===
1st round
1	(China) Xie Xingfang	21	21
(Canada) Charmaine Reid	4	6
(Chinese Taipei) Pai Min-Jie	9	17
(Hong Kong) Yip Pui Yin	21	21
5	(France) Pi Hongyan	21	21
Q3	(Hong Kong) Tse Ying Suet	15	8
(Denmark) Tine Rasmussen	21	12	21
(India) Saina Nehwal	15	21	16
4	(China) Lu Lan	21	21
(Chinese Taipei) Cheng Shao-chieh	5	16
PFQ	(Hong Kong) Ng Ka Shun	10	9
(Netherlands) Yao Jie	21	21
PFQ	(Chinese Taipei) Chang Li-Ying	20	9
PFQ	(Hong Kong) Mong Kwan Yi	22	21
Q2	(Hong Kong) Chan Hung Yung	7	9
(England) Tracey Hallam	21	21
(Japan) Eriko Hirose	21	21
(United States) Eva Lee	7	11
(Hong Kong) Zhou Mi
6	(Hong Kong) Wang Chen	w
(Netherlands) Judith Meulendijks	21	21
(Poland) Kamila Augustyn	9	12
Q1	(Chinese Taipei) Hung Shih-Chieh	8	6
3	(China) Zhu Lin	21	21
(Japan) Kaori Mori	21	21
Q4	(Hong Kong) Chan Tsz Ka	13	9
(Thailand) Salakjit Ponsana	16	21	21
8	(Malaysia) Wong Mew Choo	21	7	10
(South Korea) Jun Jae-youn	19	21	21
(Canada) Anna Rice	21	4	15
(Bulgaria) Petya Nedelcheva	19	18
2	(China) Zhang Ning	21	21

2nd round
(China) Xie Xingfang	21	21
(Hong Kong) Yip Pui Yin	14	7
(France) Pi Hongyan	16	13
(Denmark) Tine Rasmussen	21	21
(China) Lu Lan	21	21
(Netherlands) Yao Jie	19	11
(Hong Kong) Mong Kwan Yi	13	15
(England) Tracey Hallam	21	21
(Japan) Eriko Hirose	21	21
(Hong Kong) Zhou Mi	19	16
(Netherlands) Judith Meulendijks	19	15
(China) Zhu Lin	21	21
(Japan) Kaori Mori	17	21	11
(Thailand) Salakjit Ponsana	21	18	21
(South Korea) Jun Jae-youn	21	24
(China) Zhang Ning	19	22

Quarterfinals
(China) Xie Xingfang	21	21
(Denmark) Tine Rasmussen	15	15
(China) Lu Lan	21	21
(England) Tracey Hallam	14	15
(Japan) Eriko Hirose	14	10
(China) Zhu Lin	21	21
(Thailand) Salakjit Ponsana	10	12
(South Korea) Jun Jae-youn	21	21

Semifinals
(China) Xie Xingfang	21	21
(China) Lu Lan	8	10
Finals
(China) Xie Xingfang	21	21
(China) Zhu Lin	19	14
(China) Zhu Lin	11	21	21
(South Korea) Jun Jae-youn	21	10	16

== Men's doubles ==
=== Seeds ===
1. (Malaysia) Koo Kien Keat / Tan Boon Heong
2. (China) Fu Haifeng / Cai Yun
3. (Indonesia) Markis Kido / Hendra Setiawan
4. (South Korea) Jung Jae-sung / Lee Yong-dae
5. (Malaysia) Choong Tan Fook / Lee Wan Wah
6. (Indonesia) Candra Wijaya / (United States) Tony Gunawan
7. (Denmark) Jens Eriksen / Martin Lundgaard Hansen
8. (South Korea) Lee Jae-jin / Hwang Ji-man

=== Results ===
Quarterfinals
(Malaysia) Koo Kien Keat (Malaysia) Tan Boon Heong	21	12	11
(Indonesia) Candra Wijaya (United States) Tony Gunawan	11	21	21
(Poland) Michał Łogosz (Poland) Robert Mateusiak	6	11
(Indonesia) Luluk Hadiyanto (Indonesia) Alvent Yulianto	21	21
(Japan) Tadashi Ohtsuka (Japan) Keita Masuda	18	17
(Indonesia) Markis Kido (Indonesia) Hendra Setiawan	21	21
(Denmark) Lars Paaske (Denmark) Jonas Rasmussen	16	17
(China) Fu Haifeng (China) Cai Yun	21	21

Semifinals
(Indonesia) Candra Wijaya (United States) Tony Gunawan	21	21
(Indonesia) Luluk Hadiyanto (Indonesia) Alvent Yulianto	16	9
(Indonesia) Markis Kido (Indonesia) Hendra Setiawan	21	21
(China) Fu Haifeng (China) Cai Yun	15	12

Finals
(Indonesia) Candra Wijaya (United States) Tony Gunawan	12	21	13
(Indonesia) Markis Kido (Indonesia) Hendra Setiawan	21	18	21

== Women's doubles ==
=== Seeds ===
1. (China) Zhang Yawen / Wei Yili
2. (China) Yang Wei / Zhang Jiewen
3. (South Korea) Lee Kyung-won / Lee Hyo-jung
4. (Chinese Taipei) Chien Yu Chin / Cheng Wen-Hsing
5. (China) Gao Ling / Zhao Tingting
6. (Japan) Kumiko Ogura / Reiko Shiota
7. (England) Gail Emms / Donna Kellogg
8. (Malaysia) Wong Pei Tty / Chin Eei Hui

=== Results ===
Quarterfinals
(China) Zhang Yawen (China) Wei Yili	21	21
(England) Gail Emms (England) Donna Kellogg	11	17
(Chinese Taipei) Chien Yu Chin (Chinese Taipei) Cheng Wen-Hsing	21	21
(Japan) Miyuki Maeda (Japan) Satoko Suetsuna	18	15
(China) Gao Ling (China) Zhao Tingting	21	21
(South Korea) Lee Kyung-won (South Korea) Lee Hyo-jung	15	17
(China) Du Jing (China) Yu Yang	21	21	21
(China) Yang Wei (China) Zhang Jiewen	23	16	7

Semifinals
(China) Zhang Yawen (China) Wei Yili	21	21
(Chinese Taipei) Chien Yu Chin (Chinese Taipei) Cheng Wen-Hsing	16	13
(China) Gao Ling (China) Zhao Tingting	21	17	16
(China) Du Jing (China) Yu Yang	19	21	21

Finals
(China) Zhang Yawen (China) Wei Yili	20	21	17
(China) Du Jing (China) Yu Yang	22	13	21

== Mixed doubles ==
=== Seeds ===
1. (China) Zheng Bo / Gao Ling
2. (Indonesia) Nova Widianto / Lilyana Natsir
3. (China) Xie Zhongbo / Zhang Yawen
4. (Indonesia) Flandy Limpele / Vita Marissa
5. (England) Nathan Robertson / Gail Emms
6. (Denmark) Thomas Laybourn / Kamilla Rytter Juhl
7. (England) Anthony Clark / Donna Kellogg

=== Results ===
Quarterfinals
(China) Zheng Bo (China) Gao Ling	20	21	21
(Thailand) Sudket Prapakamol (Thailand) Saralee Thungthongkam	22	12	19
(China) Xie Zhongbo (China) Zhang Yawen	21	21
(South Korea) Hwang Yu-mi (South Korea) Han Sang-hoon	17	17
(South Korea) Lee Yong-dae (South Korea) Lee Hyo-jung	14	19
(Indonesia) Flandy Limpele (Indonesia) Vita Marissa	21	21
(Denmark) Thomas Laybourn (Denmark) Kamilla Rytter Juhl	21	18	16
(Indonesia) Nova Widianto (Indonesia) Lilyana Natsir	16	21	21

Semifinals
(China) Zheng Bo (China) Gao Ling
(China) Xie Zhongbo (China) Zhang Yawen	wo
(Indonesia) Flandy Limpele (Indonesia) Vita Marissa	20	21	19
(Indonesia) Nova Widianto (Indonesia) Lilyana Natsir	21	13	21

Finals
(China) Zheng Bo (China) Gao Ling	23	18	19
(Indonesia) Nova Widianto (Indonesia) Lilyana Natsir	21	21	21
