= 1997 Asian Junior Badminton Championships – Girls' team =

Badminton championship in Manila, Philippines

Girls' team at the 1997 Asian Junior Badminton Championships
- Venue: Ninoy Aquino Stadium
- Location: Manila, Philippines
- Dates: 7–9 April 1997

The girls' team tournament at the 1997 Asian Junior Badminton Championships took place from 7 to 9 April 1997 at the Ninoy Aquino Stadium in Manila, Philippines. A total of 24 teams competed in this event.

== Results ==
=== Bracket ===
Round of 16
Sri Lanka	w/o
Pakistan
Philippines	3
Kazakhstan	0
Malaysia	3
Chinese Taipei	2
Hong Kong	3
India	0

Quarter-finals
China	3
Sri Lanka	0
Japan	3
Philippines	0
South Korea	3
Malaysia	1
Hong Kong	2
Indonesia	3

Semi-finals
China	5
Japan	0
South Korea	2
Indonesia	3

Final
China	5
Indonesia	0

=== Final ===
China
5
Ninoy Aquino Stadium
9 April 1997

Indonesia
0

			1	2	3
1	(China) (Indonesia)	Yu Hua; Melisa Dewi	11; 1	11; 2
2	(China) (Indonesia)	Gong Ruina; Hanny Setiani	11; 0	5; 11	11; 6
3	(China) (Indonesia)	Zhou Mi; Atu Rosalina	11; 4	11; 2
4	(China) (Indonesia)	Gao Ling / Yang Wei; Vita Marissa / Eny Widiowati	15; 2	15; 4
5	(China) (Indonesia)	Pi Hongyan / Zhou Mi; Denny Setiawan / Alvent Yulianto	15; 8	15; 4
