= Zhu Lin (badminton) =

Chinese badminton player

Zhu Lin 朱琳
Personal information
- Born: 29 October 1984 (age 42) Shanghai, China
- Height: 1.72 m (5 ft 8 in)
- Weight: 57 kg (126 lb)

Sport
- Country: China
- Sport: Badminton
- Handedness: Right

Women's singles
- Highest ranking: 1
- BWF profile
Medal record
Women's badminton
Representing China
World Championships
Gold medal – first place	2007 Kuala Lumpur	Women's singles
Uber Cup
Gold medal – first place	2008 Jakarta	Women's team
Asian Games
Gold medal – first place	2006 Doha	Women's team
Asia Championships
Gold medal – first place	2009 Suwon	Women's singles
World Junior Championships
Gold medal – first place	2002 Pretoria	Mixed team
Gold medal – first place	2000 Guangzhou	Mixed team
Asian Junior Championships
Gold medal – first place	2002 Kuala Lumpur	Girls' singles
Gold medal – first place	2002 Kuala Lumpur	Girls' team

Zhu Lin (Chinese: 朱琳; pinyin: Zhū Lín; born 29 October 1984) is a badminton player from Shanghai, China. She is 2007 world champion in women's singles. Zhu graduated from the Tongji University in the marketing department. She also won the women's singles gold medal at the 2009 Asia Championships.

== Achievements ==
=== BWF World Championships ===
Women's singles
Year	Venue	Opponent	Score	Result
2007	Putra Indoor Stadium; Kuala Lumpur, Malaysia	(Hong Kong) Wang Chen	21–8, 21–12	Gold

=== Asian Championships ===
Women's singles
Year	Venue	Opponent	Score	Result
2009	Suwon Indoor Stadium; Suwon, South Korea	(China) Xie Xingfang	21–11, 21–10	Gold

=== Asian Junior Championships ===
Girls' singles
Year	Venue	Opponent	Score	Result
2002	Kuala Lumpur Badminton Stadium; Kuala Lumpur, Malaysia	(China) Jiang Yanjiao	11–3, 11–6	Gold

=== BWF Superseries ===
The BWF Superseries, launched on 14 December 2006 and implemented in 2007, is a series of elite badminton tournaments sanctioned by the Badminton World Federation (BWF). BWF Superseries has two levels, the Superseries and Superseries Premier. A season of Superseries features twelve tournaments around the world, which was introduced 2011, with successful players invited to the Superseries Finals held at the year's end.

Women's singles
Year	Tournament	Opponent	Score	Result
2007	Malaysia Open	(Malaysia) Wong Mew Choo	21–15, 21–12	(gold) Winner
2007	Korea Open	(China) Xie Xingfang	14–21, 7–21	(silver) Runner-up
2007	Indonesia Open	(Hong Kong) Wang Chen	14–21, 13–21	(silver) Runner-up
2007	Hong Kong Open	(China) Xie Xingfang	19–21, 14–21	(silver) Runner-up
2008	Malaysia Open	(Denmark) Tine Rasmussen	21–18, 19–21, 18–21	(silver) Runner-up
2008	Indonesia Open	(Indonesia) Maria Kristin Yulianti	21–18, 17–21, 21–14	(gold) Winner

BWF Super Series Finals tournament
BWF Super Series Premier tournament
BWF Super Series tournament

=== BWF Grand Prix ===
The BWF Grand Prix has two levels, the Grand Prix and Grand Prix Gold. It is a series of badminton tournaments sanctioned by the Badminton World Federation (BWF) since 2007. The World Badminton Grand Prix has been sanctioned by the International Badminton Federation (IBF) from 1983 to 2006.

Women's singles
Year	Tournament	Opponent	Score	Result
2005	Malaysia Open	(China) Zhang Ning	6–11, 2–11	(silver) Runner-up
2006	Swiss Open	(Germany) Xu Huaiwen	9–11, 4–11	(silver) Runner-up
2006	Indonesia Open	(China) Lu Lan	21–11, 21–16	(gold) Winner
2006	Thailand Open	(South Korea) Hwang Hye-youn	21–13, 18–21, 21–15	(gold) Winner
2006	Korea Open	(China) Lu Lan	18–21, 11–21	(silver) Runner-up
2007	Thailand Open	(Hong Kong) Zhou Mi	20–22, 21–5, 21–4	(gold) Winner
2009	German Open	(China) Wang Yihan	22–20, 13–21, 11–21	(silver) Runner-up
2010	Canada Open	(Germany) Juliane Schenk	21–19, 17–21, 21–10	(gold) Winner
2010	U.S. Open	(Netherlands) Judith Meulendijks	21–19, 11–6 retired	(gold) Winner

BWF Grand Prix Gold tournament
BWF Grand Prix tournament

=== IBF International ===
Women's singles
Year	Tournament	Opponent	Score	Result
2004	Polish International	(China) Lu Lan	7–11, 2–11	(silver) Runner-up

== Record against selected opponents ==
Record against year-end Finals finalists, World Championships semi-finalists, and Olympic quarter-finalists.

Players	Matches	Results		Difference
Players	Matches	Won	Lost	Difference
(Bulgaria) Petya Nedelcheva	2	2	0	+2
(China) Li Xuerui	1	1	0	+1
(China) Lu Lan	10	3	7	–4
(China) Wang Lin	2	1	1	0
(China) Wang Shixian	1	0	1	–1
(China) Wang Xin	3	2	1	+1
(China) Wang Yihan	1	0	1	–1
(China) Xie Xingfang	6	1	5	–4
(China) Zhang Ning	3	0	3	–3
(Chinese Taipei) Cheng Shao-chieh	2	2	0	+2
(Chinese Taipei) Huang Chia-chi	1	1	0	+1
(Chinese Taipei) Tai Tzu-ying	2	1	1	0
(Denmark) Tine Baun	3	1	2	–1
(Denmark) Camilla Martin	2	0	2	–2
(England) Tracey Hallam	1	1	0	+1

Players	Matches	Results		Difference
Players	Matches	Won	Lost	Difference
(France) Pi Hongyan	11	8	3	+5
(Germany) Juliane Schenk	4	4	0	+4
(Germany) Petra Overzier	1	1	0	+1
(Germany) Xu Huaiwen	7	5	2	+3
(Hong Kong) Wang Chen	6	3	3	0
(Hong Kong) Yip Pui Yin	5	3	2	+1
(Hong Kong) Zhou Mi	6	5	1	+4
(India) Saina Nehwal	4	2	2	0
(Indonesia) Maria Kristin Yulianti	2	1	1	0
(Japan) Minatsu Mitani	2	0	2	–2
(Malaysia) Wong Mew Choo	6	5	1	+4
(Netherlands) Mia Audina	1	0	1	–1
(South Korea) Bae Yeon-ju	1	1	0	+1
(Thailand) Porntip Buranaprasertsuk	1	1	0	+1
(Thailand) Ratchanok Intanon	2	1	1	0
