= Maria Kristin Yulianti =

Indonesian badminton player

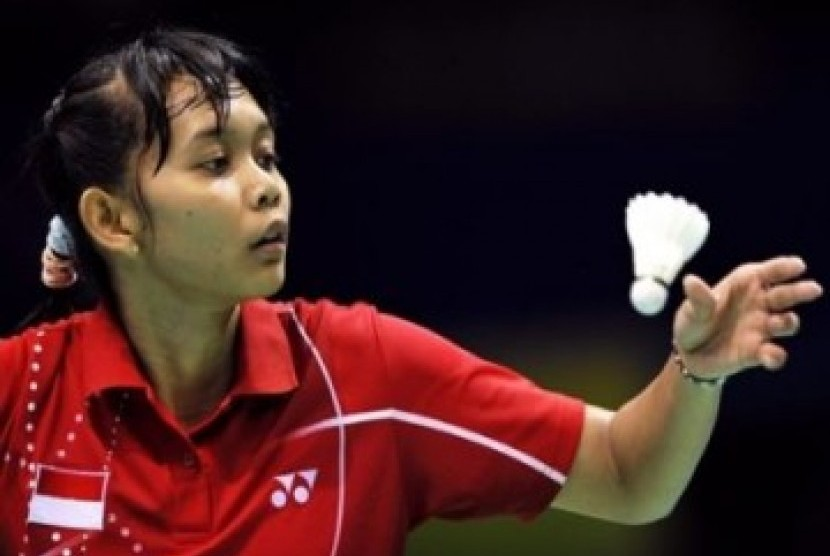
- Maria Kristin Yulianti in 2010

Personal information
- Born: 25 June 1985 (age 41) Tuban, East Java, Indonesia
- Height: 1.67 m (5 ft 6 in)
- Spouse: Andri Setianto (m. 2016)

Sport
- Country: Indonesia
- Sport: Badminton
- Handedness: Right
- Coached by: Hendrawan; Marleve Mainaky

Women's singles
- Highest ranking: 11
- BWF profile
Medal record
Women's badminton
Representing Indonesia
Olympic Games
Bronze medal – third place	2008 Beijing	Women's singles
Sudirman Cup
Silver medal – second place	2007 Glasgow	Mixed team
Bronze medal – third place	2009 Guangzhou	Mixed team
Uber Cup
Silver medal – second place	2008 Jakarta	Women's team
Bronze medal – third place	2010 Kuala Lumpur	Women's team
SEA Games
Gold medal – first place	2007 Nakhon Ratchasima	Women's singles
Gold medal – first place	2007 Nakhon Ratchasima	Women's team
Silver medal – second place	2009 Vientiane	Women's team
Bronze medal – third place	2003 Vietnam	Women's team
Bronze medal – third place	2005 Manila	Women's team

Maria Kristin Yulianti (born 25 June 1985) is an Indonesian badminton player. She is a bronze medalist in women's singles at the 2008 Olympics.

== Career ==
=== 2004 ===
Yulianti played in some satellite competitions and won the Malaysian tournament.

=== 2005 ===
Yulianti played in more satellite tournaments and won three: the Surabaya, Jakarta, and the Cheers Asian satellite tournaments.

=== 2006 ===
Yulianti started to play tougher competitions but still played in satellite tournaments. She played in the Bitburger Open and achieved runner-up, beaten by Xu Huaiwen of Germany in the final, but she scored an upset by beating the seeded player Pi Hongyan of France in the quarterfinal. She played in the Singapore Satellite tournament and claimed the title. She became the most successful player on the national team.

=== 2007 ===
This year, Yulianti was the dominant player on her team. She played in the World Championships as the 15th seed, her highest rank in 2007. She was beaten in the third round by the world number one, Zhang Ning of China. She reached her first quarterfinal of the Super Series tournament in Indonesia, by beating Lu Lan of China in a rubber set. She was stopped by Petya Nedelcheva of Bulgaria in straight sets. In December, she won the SEA Games in Thailand over fellow countrywoman Adriyanti Firdasari.

=== 2008 ===
She competed in a few Super Series tournaments such as All England and the Swiss Open but was stopped in the first round in each. She entered the Uber Cup team and won against the second-seeded country, Japan, by a score of 4–1. While she was defeated by the Japanese, Eriko Hirose, 21–9, 20–22, 20–22, her teammates secured the team victory against the other Japanese players. They reached the final for the first time in 14 years by beating Hong Kong in the quarterfinal and Germany in the semifinal. They were defeated in the final by China, 0–3.

Yulianti competed in the Indonesia Open. She beat her compatriot, Pia Zebadiah Bernadet and Yao Jie of Netherlands in the first two rounds. She followed this by defeating the 7th seed, Zhou Mi of Hong Kong in three sets, 21–17, 15–21, 21–16. She accomplished a big upset by beating the Chinese senior player and second seed, Zhang Ning, in a very tight match, 21–14, 20–22, 22–20 and reached her first Super Series final. There she was beaten by the 1st seed, Zhu Lin, after fighting for more than an hour in three sets, 18–21, 21–17, 14–21.

Yulianti's biggest achievement in the sport, thus far, is earning the women's singles bronze medal at the 2008 Summer Olympics as an unseeded player. She is only the third Indonesian woman, and the fifth woman not representing China, to be awarded a medal in women's singles since badminton entered the Games in 1992. In the round of 64, she saved a match point against Juliane Schenk of Germany and won the game in the rubber set, 18–21, 21–13, 22–20. She followed this by defeating Yoana Martínez of Spain in straight sets. She started to get noticed after she defeated the All England champion, Tine Rasmussen of Denmark, in three sets, 18–21, 21–19, 21–14. She reached the semifinal by beating Saina Nehwal of India after she saved 8 game points and won 26–28, 21–14, 21–15. She lost to eventual gold medalist Zhang Ning in the semifinal, 15–21, 15–21. However, Yulianti defeated the 3rd seed, Lu Lan, in the playoff for the bronze medal, 11–21, 21–13, 21–15.

After the Olympics, she competed in some Super Series tournaments, although she was always defeated by Lu Lan in three sets. Notable matches include her victory over the 6th-seeded Wong Mew Choo of Malaysia in the Japan Open, 18–21, 21–13, 21–6, as well as her defeat of Zhu Lin, the 5th seed, 21–15, 21–14, in the French Open.

=== 2009 ===
This year might be her worst time in her career. She got injured from December last year, and played her first Super Series tournament in June. Before that time, she was followed Malaysia, but failed to enter the next round, after beaten by Zhang Beiwen in the first round. Then, she was represented Indonesia in Sudirman Cup by only winning her first match against Sayaka Sato.

== Achievements ==
=== Olympic Games ===
Women's singles
Year	Venue	Opponent	Score	Result	Ref.
2008	Beijing University of Technology Gymnasium; Beijing, China	(China) Lu Lan	11–21, 21–13, 21–15	Bronze	

=== SEA Games ===
Women's singles
Year	Venue	Opponent	Score	Result	Ref.
2007	Wongchawalitkul University; Nakhon Ratchasima, Thailand	(Indonesia) Adriyanti Firdasari	21–16, 21–15	Gold	

=== BWF Superseries (1 runner-up) ===
The BWF Superseries, which was launched on 14 December 2006 and implemented in 2007, was a series of elite badminton tournaments, sanctioned by the Badminton World Federation (BWF). BWF Superseries levels were Superseries and Superseries Premier. A season of Superseries consisted of twelve tournaments around the world that had been introduced since 2011. Successful players were invited to the Superseries Finals, which were held at the end of each year.

Women's singles
Year	Tournament	Opponent	Score	Result	Ref.
2008	Indonesia Open	(China) Zhu Lin	18–21, 21–17, 14–21	(silver) Runner-up	

BWF Super Series Finals tournament
BWF Super Series Premier tournament
BWF Super Series tournament

=== IBF Grand Prix (1 runner-up) ===
The World Badminton Grand Prix was sanctioned by the International Badminton Federation from 1983 to 2006.

Women's singles
Year	Tournament	Opponent	Score	Result	Ref.
2006	Bitburger Open	(Germany) Xu Huaiwen	18–21, 21–17, 14–21	(silver) Runner-up	

=== BWF International Challenge/Series/Asian Satellite (5 titles, 1 runner-up) ===
Women's singles
Year	Tournament	Opponent	Score	Result	Ref.
2004	Malaysia Satellite	(Indonesia) Adriyanti Firdasari	8–11, 11–2, 11–8	(gold) Winner	
2005	Jakarta Satellite	(Indonesia) Fransisca Ratnasari	2–11, 11–5, 11–2	(gold) Winner	
2005	Surabaya Satellite	(Indonesia) Silvi Antarini	8–11, 11–6, 11–4	(gold) Winner	
2006	Cheers Asian Satellite	(Malaysia) Julia Wong Pei Xian	21–13, 22–20	(gold) Winner	
2006	Surabaya Satellite	(Malaysia) Julia Wong Pei Xian	21–16, 21–15	(gold) Winner	
2011	White Nights	(Indonesia) Fransisca Ratnasari	15–21, 23–21, 11–21	(silver) Runner-up	

BWF International Challenge tournament
BWF International Series tournament

== Performance timeline ==
Key

W	Won	F	Finalist	SF	Semi-finalist
QF	Quarter-finalist	#R	Rounds 4, 3, 2, 1	RR	Round-robin stage
Q#	Qualification round	A	Absent	w/d	Withdrew
G	Gold	S	Silver	B	Bronze
NH	Not held	N/A	Not applicable	DNQ	Did not qualify

=== National team ===
- Senior level

Team events	2003	2004	2005	2006	2007	2008	2009	2010
SEA Games	B	NH	B	NH	G	NH	S	NH
Uber Cup	NH	QF	NH	A	NH	S	NH	B
Sudirman Cup	A	NH	A	NH	S	NH	B	NH

=== Individual competitions ===
- Senior level

Events	2007	2008	2009	2010	2011
SEA Games	G	NH	A	NH	A
Asian Championships	A			1R	1R
World Championships	3R	NH	3R	A	
Olympic Games	NH	B	NH		

Tournament	IBF Grand Prix	BWF Superseries / Grand Prix					Best
Tournament	2006	2007	2008	2009	2010	2011	Best
Korea Open	A	1R	A				1R ('07)
Malaysia Open	A	2R	A				2R ('07)
German Open	A		QF	A			QF ('08)
All England Open	A		1R	A			1R ('08)
Swiss Open	A		1R	A			1R ('08)
Australian Open	N/A	A				1R	1R ('11)
India Open	NH		A	1R	A		1R ('09)
Singapore Open	A	2R	A		Q1	A	2R ('07)
Indonesia Open	2R	QF	F	1R	QF	A	F ('08)
Malaysia Masters	NH			A	2R	A	2R ('10)
Thailand Open	A				NH	Q3	Q3 ('11)
Russian Open	NH	A				1R	1R ('11)
Taipei Open	A	QF	QF	A			QF ('07, '08)
Bitburger Open	F	A					F ('06)
China Masters	A	2R	A				2R ('07)
Japan Open	A	2R	QF	1R	A		QF ('08)
Vietnam Open	A				QF	A	QF ('10)
Indonesia Masters	NH				1R	A	1R ('10)
Dutch Open	QF	A					QF ('06)
Denmark Open	3R	1R	2R	A			3R ('06)
French Open	NH	1R	QF	A			QF ('08)
Hong Kong Open	A			1R	A		1R ('09)
China Open	A			2R	A		2R ('09)
Philippines Open	A	1R	NH	A	NH		1R ('07)
Year-end ranking				53	86	140	11
Tournament	2006	2007	2008	2009	2010	2011	Best

== Record against selected opponents ==
Record against year-end Finals finalists, World Championships semi-finalists, and Olympic quarter-finalists.

Players	Matches	Results		Difference
Players	Matches	Won	Lost	Difference
(Australia) Huang Chia-chi	3	2	1	+1
(Bulgaria) Petya Nedelcheva	2	0	2	–2
(China) Gong Ruina	1	0	1	–1
(China) Li Xuerui	1	0	1	–1
(China) Lu Lan	5	2	3	–1
(China) Wang Shixian	1	0	1	–1
(China) Wang Xin	1	0	1	–1
(China) Wang Yihan	1	0	1	–1
(China) Xie Xingfang	2	0	2	–2
(China) Zhang Ning	3	1	2	–1
(China) Zhu Lin	2	1	1	0
(Chinese Taipei) Cheng Shao-chieh	1	1	0	+1
(Chinese Taipei) Tai Tzu-ying	1	0	1	–1
(Denmark) Tine Baun	2	1	1	0

Players	Matches	Results		Difference
Players	Matches	Won	Lost	Difference
(Denmark) Camilla Martin	1	0	1	–1
(England) Tracey Hallam	2	0	2	–2
(France) Pi Hongyan	3	0	3	–3
(Germany) Juliane Schenk	1	1	0	+1
(Germany) / (China) Xu Huaiwen	3	0	3	–3
(Hong Kong) Wang Chen	1	0	1	–1
(Hong Kong) Yip Pui Yin	2	1	1	0
(Hong Kong) Zhou Mi	3	1	2	–1
(India) Saina Nehwal	1	1	0	+1
(Malaysia) Wong Mew Choo	2	1	1	0
(Netherlands) Mia Audina	1	0	1	–1
(South Korea) Bae Yeon-ju	1	0	1	–1
(Thailand) Porntip Buranaprasertsuk	1	1	0	+1
(Thailand) Ratchanok Intanon	1	0	1	–1
