= Badminton at the 2006 Asian Games – Women's team =

Women's team at the 2006 Asian Games
- Venue: Aspire Hall 3
- Dates: 30 November – 5 December
- Competitors: 70 from 9 nations

Medalists
gold medal	China; Gao Ling, Huang Sui, Xie Xingfang, Yang Wei, Zhang Jiewen, Zhang Ning, Zhang Yawen, Zhu Lin
silver medal	Japan; Eriko Hirose, Miyuki Maeda, Kaori Mori, Kumiko Ogura, Reiko Shiota, Satoko Suetsuna, Kanako Yonekura
bronze medal	Singapore; Siti Noor Ashikin, Jiang Yanmei, Li Li, Li Yujia, Frances Liu, Vanessa Neo, Shinta Mulia Sari, Xing Aiying
bronze medal	South Korea; Ha Jung-eun, Hwang Hye-youn, Hwang Yu-mi, Jun Jae-youn, Lee Hyo-jung, Lee Hyun-jin, Lee Kyung-won, Lee Yun-hwa

The badminton women's team tournament at the 2006 Asian Games in Doha took place from 30 November to 5 December at Aspire Hall 3.

== Schedule ==
All times are Arabia Standard Time (UTC+03:00)

Date	Time	Event
Thursday, 30 November 2006	13:00	League stage 1
Saturday, 2 December 2006	09:00	League stage 2
Saturday, 2 December 2006	17:00	League stage 3
Sunday, 3 December 2006	09:00	Repechage 1
Sunday, 3 December 2006	13:00	Repechage 2
Sunday, 3 December 2006	17:00	Repechage 3
Monday, 4 December 2006	09:00	Semifinals
Tuesday, 5 December 2006	16:00	Final

== Results ==
=== League stage ===
==== Pool W ====
Pos	Team	Pld	W	L	MF	MA
1	China	2	2	0	10	0
2	Indonesia	2	1	1	3	7
3	Malaysia	2	0	2	2	8

Source: Official website

30 November	Malaysia	0–5	China

Wong Mew Choo	1–2	Zhang Ning	21–19, 18–21, 18–21
Chin Eei Hui / Wong Pei Tty	0–2	Gao Ling / Huang Sui	20–22, 17–21
Julia Wong	0–2	Xie Xingfang	5–21, 9–21
Joanne Quay / Lim Pek Siah	0–2	Yang Wei / Zhang Jiewen	10–21, 9–21
Ooi Sock Ai	0–2	Zhu Lin	13–21, 3–21

2 December	Indonesia	0–5	China

Fransisca Ratnasari	0–2	Zhang Ning	13–21, 14–21
Jo Novita / Greysia Polii	0–2	Huang Sui / Gao Ling	11–21, 5–21
Adriyanti Firdasari	0–2	Xie Xingfang	13–21, 13–21
Liliyana Natsir / Lita Nurlita	0–2	Yang Wei / Zhang Jiewen	15–21, 18–21
Pia Zebadiah Bernadet	0–2	Zhu Lin	15–21, 18–21

2 December	Indonesia	3–2	Malaysia

Fransisca Ratnasari	0–2	Wong Mew Choo	13–21, 16–21
Jo Novita / Greysia Polii	1–2	Wong Pei Tty / Chin Eei Hui	21–17, 20–22, Retired
Adriyanti Firdasari	2–0	Julia Wong	21–18, 21–15
Liliyana Natsir / Lita Nurlita	2–0	Joanne Quay / Lim Pek Siah	21–9, 21–19
Pia Zebadiah Bernadet	2–0	Norshahliza Baharum	21–14, 21–13

==== Pool X ====
Pos	Team	Pld	W	L	MF	MA
1	Singapore	2	1	1	6	4
2	Hong Kong	2	1	1	5	5
3	Thailand	2	1	1	4	6

Source: Official website

30 November	Hong Kong	2–3	Thailand

Wang Chen	2–0	Soratja Chansrisukot	21–13, 21–6
Yip Pui Yin	2–0	Monthila Meemek	21–15, 21–19
Olivia Wong	0–2	Salakjit Ponsana	13–21, 14–21
Wang Chen / Koon Wai Chee	0–2	Kunchala Voravichitchaikul / Duanganong Aroonkesorn	20–22, 13–21
Yip Pui Yin / Chau Hoi Wah	0–2	Saralee Thungthongkam / Sathinee Chankrachangwong	14–21, 11–21

2 December	Singapore	4–1	Thailand

Li Li	2–0	Soratja Chansrisukot	21–19, 21–12
Xing Aiying	2–0	Monthila Meemek	21–13, 21–19
Jiang Yanmei	2–1	Salakjit Ponsana	21–8, 14–21, 21–18
Li Yujia / Shinta Mulia Sari	2–1	Kunchala Voravichitchaikul / Duanganong Aroonkesorn	21–19, 12–21, 21–17
Jiang Yanmei / Vanessa Neo	0–2	Saralee Thungthongkam / Sathinee Chankrachangwong	6–21, 7–21

2 December	Singapore	2–3	Hong Kong

Li Li	0–2	Wang Chen	12–21, 19–21
Xing Aiying	0–2	Yip Pui Yin	11–21, 11–21
Jiang Yanmei	2–0	Assunta Ng	21–14, 21–11
Li Yujia / Shinta Mulia Sari	2–0	Yip Pui Yin / Chau Hoi Wah	21–18, 21–14
Jiang Yanmei / Frances Liu	0–2	Wang Chen / Koon Wai Chee	11–21, 18–21

==== Pool Y ====
Pos	Team	Pld	W	L	MF	MA
1	Japan	2	2	0	7	3
2	South Korea	2	1	1	5	3
3	Chinese Taipei	2	0	2	1	7

Source: Official website

30 November	South Korea	2–3	Japan

Hwang Hye-youn	2–0	Kaori Mori	21–10, 21–9
Lee Kyung-won / Lee Hyo-jung	2–0	Reiko Shiota / Miyuki Maeda	21–12, 21–13
Lee Yun-hwa	0–2	Eriko Hirose	16–21, 18–21
Hwang Yu-mi / Ha Jung-eun	1–2	Kumiko Ogura / Satoko Suetsuna	17–21, 21–13, 19–21
Jun Jae-youn	0–2	Kanako Yonekura	20–22, 15–21

2 December	Chinese Taipei	1–4	Japan

Cheng Shao-chieh	2–1	Kaori Mori	21–17, 13–21, 21–19
Pai Min-jie	0–2	Eriko Hirose	12–21, 14–21
Chien Yu-chin	1–2	Kanako Yonekura	21–19, 13–21, 7–21
Chou Chia-chi / Ku Pei-ting	0–2	Miyuki Maeda / Satoko Suetsuna	19–21, 17–21
Chien Yu-chin / Cheng Wen-hsing	0–2	Kumiko Ogura / Reiko Shiota	15–21, 7–21

2 December	Chinese Taipei	0–3	South Korea

Cheng Shao-chieh	1–2	Hwang Hye-youn	21–19, 20–22, 9–21
Pai Min-jie	0–2	Lee Yun-hwa	13–21, 14–21
Chien Yu-chin	0–2	Jun Jae-youn	18–21, 16–21

=== Repechage ===
==== Pool Z ====
Pos	Team	Pld	W	L	MF	MA
1	South Korea	2	2	0	6	4
2	Hong Kong	2	1	1	7	3
3	Indonesia	2	0	2	2	8

Source: Official website

3 December	South Korea	3–2	Indonesia

Hwang Hye-youn	2–0	Fransisca Ratnasari	21–13, 21–8
Lee Kyung-won / Lee Hyo-jung	2–0	Liliyana Natsir / Lita Nurlita	21–11, 21–9
Lee Yun-hwa	1–2	Adriyanti Firdasari	10–21, 22–20, 7–21
Hwang Yu-mi / Ha Jung-eun	2–0	Greysia Polii / Vita Marissa	21–19, 21–18
Jun Jae-youn	0–2	Pia Zebadiah Bernadet	Walkover

3 December	South Korea	3–2	Hong Kong

Hwang Hye-youn	1–2	Yip Pui Yin	19–21, 21–11, 12–21
Lee Hyo-jung / Hwang Yu-mi	2–0	Koon Wai Chee / Wong Man Ching	21–13, 21–10
Lee Yun-hwa	2–0	Assunta Ng	21–5, 21–8
Lee Kyung-won / Ha Jung-eun	2–0	Yip Pui Yin / Chau Hoi Wah	21–7, 21–11
Jun Jae-youn	0–2	Olivia Wong	Walkover

3 December	Hong Kong	5–0	Indonesia

Yip Pui Yin	2–0	Fransisca Ratnasari	Walkover
Wong Man Ching / Chau Hoi Wah	2–0	Liliyana Natsir / Lita Nurlita	Walkover
Assunta Ng	2–0	Adriyanti Firdasari	Walkover
Yip Pui Yin / Koon Wai Chee	2–0	Greysia Polii / Vita Marissa	Walkover
Olivia Wong	2–0	Pia Zebadiah Bernadet	Walkover

=== Knockout stage ===
Semifinals
X1	Singapore	0
Y1	Japan	3
W1	China	3
Z1	South Korea	0

Final
Y1	Japan	0
W1	China	3

==== Semifinals ====
4 December	Singapore	0–3	Japan

Li Li	0–2	Kaori Mori	19–21, 11–21
Jiang Yanmei / Li Yujia	0–2	Kumiko Ogura / Reiko Shiota	21–23, 14–21
Xing Aiying	1–2	Eriko Hirose	14–21, 21–12, 18–21

4 December	China	3–0	South Korea

Zhang Ning	2–0	Lee Yun-hwa	21–14, 21–7
Gao Ling / Huang Sui	2–0	Lee Kyung-won / Hwang Yu-mi	21–11, 21–8
Xie Xingfang	2–0	Lee Hyun-jin	21–7, 21–13

==== Final ====
5 December	Japan	0–3	China

Kaori Mori	0–2	Zhang Ning	13–21, 15–21
Kumiko Ogura / Reiko Shiota	0–2	Yang Wei / Zhang Jiewen	8–21, 15–21
Eriko Hirose	0–2	Xie Xingfang	12–21, 15–21

== Non-participating athletes ==
- Zhang Yawen (CHN)
- Siti Noor Ashikin (SIN)
- Sirivannavari Nariratana (THA)
- Huang Chia-hsin (TPE)
