= Zhang Ning =

Chinese badminton player

Zhang Ning 张宁
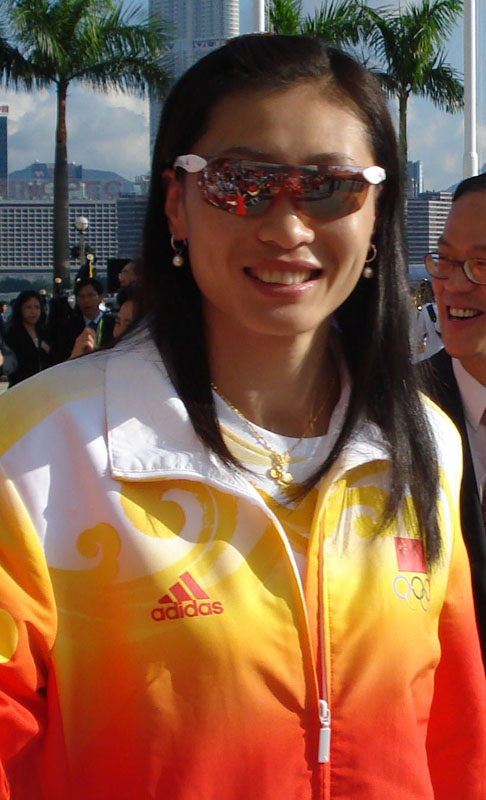

Personal information
- Born: 19 May 1975 (age 51) Jinzhou, Liaoning, China
- Height: 1.75 m (5 ft 9 in)
- Weight: 64 kg (141 lb; 10.1 st)

Sport
- Country: China
- Sport: Badminton
- Handedness: Right

Women's singles
- Career record: 385 Win, 97 Loss
- Highest ranking: 1
- BWF profile (archived)
Medal record
Women's badminton
Representing China
Olympic Games
Gold medal – first place	2004 Athens	Women's singles
Gold medal – first place	2008 Beijing	Women's singles
World Championships
Gold medal – first place	2003 Birmingham	Women's singles
Silver medal – second place	2005 Anaheim	Women's singles
Silver medal – second place	2006 Madrid	Women's singles
Bronze medal – third place	2001 Seville	Women's singles
Bronze medal – third place	2007 Kuala Lumpur	Women's singles
World Cup
Silver medal – second place	2005 Yiyang	Women's singles
Bronze medal – third place	2006 Yiyang	Women's singles
Sudirman Cup
Gold medal – first place	2005 Beijing	Mixed team
Gold medal – first place	2007 Glasgow	Mixed team
Uber Cup
Gold medal – first place	2004 Jakarta	Women's team
Gold medal – first place	2006 Tokyo/Sendai	Women's team
Silver medal – second place	1994 Jakarta	Women's team
Silver medal – second place	1996 Hong Kong	Women's team
Asian Games
Gold medal – first place	1998 Bangkok	Women's team
Gold medal – first place	2002 Busan	Women's team
Gold medal – first place	2006 Doha	Women's team
Asian Championships
Gold medal – first place	2001 Manila	Women's singles
Silver medal – second place	1999 Kuala Lumpur	Women's singles
Silver medal – second place	2002 Bangkok	Women's singles
Asian Cup
Gold medal – first place	1996 Seoul	Women's singles
East Asian Games
Gold medal – first place	1993 Shanghai	Women's team
Silver medal – second place	1993 Shanghai	Women's doubles
Bronze medal – third place	1993 Shanghai	Women's singles

Zhang Ning (simplified Chinese: 张宁; traditional Chinese: 張寧; pinyin: Zhāng Níng; born 19 May 1975) is a Chinese badminton player. She won the Olympic gold medal twice for women's singles in both 2004 and 2008. She has played badminton on the world scene since the mid-1990s and has been particularly successful since 2002 while in her late twenties and early thirties, relatively late for singles at the highest level, and especially for top players in the Chinese system who are developed very early. She is known for her consistency of shot, deception and constant pressure, dictating the pace of rallies and working her opponents in all four corners of the court. She is the only female player to win consecutive Olympic singles gold medals. She also became World champion in 2003 and has a total of five medals of all colours in the competition.

Zhang first represented China in the Uber Cup (women's world team championship) competition in 1994 and last represented it in 2006. Though she was not always chosen to play in each of the biennial editions of this tournament, the span of her Uber Cup service is the longest of any Chinese player.

== Career ==
=== 2003 ===
Although she had previously won a number of international open titles dating from the mid-1990s, Zhang's breakthrough as a dominant player on the world circuit came in the 2003 IBF World Championships, where she stormed into the final. There, 28-year-old Zhang Ning defeated compatriot Gong Ruina easily 11-6, 11-3.

=== 2004 ===
The following year, Zhang played badminton at the 2004 Summer Olympics for China. In women's singles, she defeated Marina Andrievskaya of Sweden and Kelly Morgan of Great Britain in the first two rounds. In the quarterfinals, Zhang beat Wang Chen of Hong Kong 9-11, 11-6, 11-7 to advance to the semifinals. There, she defeated countrywoman Zhou Mi 11-6, 11-4. Zhang defeated Netherlands's Mia Audina 8-11, 11-6, 11-7 in the final to win the [gold medal. It was sweet revenge for the 29-year-old, who had lost to Audina 10 years earlier in the decisive match of the Uber Cup. With her Olympic win, she became one of three singles players in the world to win the World Championship and the Olympic Games (in either order) in successive years, the others being Susi Susanti and Taufik Hidayat.

=== 2005 ===
Zhang also claimed many titles after her breakthrough wins. She bested Xie Xingfang in the 2005 China Open 3-11, 11-4, 11-8, but in the 2005 World Championships final Zhang fell to Xie Xingfang, 8-11, 11-9, 3-11.

=== 2006 ===
In 2006, Zhang reached the finals of the World Championships yet again, but she was still unable to defeat Xingfang. This time, she lost 16-21, 14-21. However, Zhang claimed revenge in the Japan Open, defeating Xingfang 21-11, 16-21, 30-29. This was the 19th time they had met in an international tournament, with the head-to-head tied at 9-9.

During this year the well known Dutch documentary filmmaker Roel van Dalen made the documentary film Olympic Journey - The Road to Beijing on the life of Zhang Ning, which was broadcast on television worldwide.

=== 2007 ===
In 2007, Zhang won her fifth Singapore Open title in six times, beating Xingfang 21-18, 19-21, 21-3. In the World Championships, Xingfang was defeated in the third round by Malaysian Wong Mew Choo, making Zhang a favourite for the title. However, she was stopped in the semi-finals by Wang Chen. This was the second time Wang Chen had beaten her in 2007, after the Indonesian Open. Zhang's compatriot Zhu Lin went on to beat Wang in the final 21-8, 21-12. In the Beijing Good Luck Invitational tournament, Zhang reached the semi-finals to face Zhu Lin but pulled out due to injury.

In the Danish Open, she reached the final, but lost 17-21, 14-21 to compatriot Lu Lan due to a thigh injury. Zhang also reached the semi-finals of the French Open, but was upset by local hope Pi Hongyan.

In the China Open, Zhang lost in straight sets to Malaysia's Wong Mew Choo in the semi-finals. Zhang cited injury and fatigue as the main reasons for her loss.

=== 2008 ===
Zhang's 2008 season started with a first round loss in the Malaysian Open. She was seen coaching her younger teammates in the tournament as well. In the Korean Open, she lost to her former compatriot, Zhou Mi, in the quarter-final. Zhou now plays for Hong Kong. In the All England, Zhang and Xie, the top 2 seeds, lost in the first round. However they both bounced back strongly in the Swiss Open to reach the final, for their 22nd international meeting. To be in the final was a relief for Zhang, who had failed to get past the quarter-finals in three previous tournaments. Still, Xie beat Zhang 21-18, 21-17, bringing their head-to-head stands to 11:11.

Later, at the Beijing Olympic Games, Zhang progressed to the quarter-final after overcoming South Korean Jun Jae Youn in the third round. She then subdued fifth-seeded Pi Hongyan of France and Indonesia's Maria Kristin Yulianti 21-15, 21-15 to reach the final. There she faced compatriot and world number 1 Xie Xingfang and won in a tough three-setter, 21-12, 10-21, 21-18, to extend her gold medal reign. Zhang became the first badminton player to ever defend an Olympic singles title even though many questioned her ability to do so at the age of 33. She was additionally chosen to represent China as the flag bearer for the 2008 Summer Olympics closing ceremony.

== Retirement ==
Having previously announced her plans to retire after the 2008 Olympic Games, a retirement ceremony for Zhang and other retiring members of the Chinese national team was held at the 2008 China Open Badminton Championships in Shanghai in November 2008. She was in tears receiving an award during the ceremony to mark her retirement with five other teammates from the Chinese national badminton team on the sidelines of the China Open badminton event in Shanghai, November 23, 2008. After her retirement, Zhang Ning immediately began working with the Chinese national team in coaching and developing the up-and-coming women's singles players. In 2018 however she was replaced by Luo Yigang as the coach of China's women's badminton team following the below par performance of team at the Uber Cup.

== Achievements ==
=== Olympic Games ===
Women's singles
Year	Venue	Opponent	Score	Result
2004	Goudi Olympic Hall; Athens, Greece	(Netherlands) Mia Audina	8–11, 11–6, 11–7	Gold
2008	Beijing University of Technology Gymnasium; Beijing, China	(China) Xie Xingfang	21–12, 10–21, 21–18	Gold

=== World Championships ===
Women's singles
Year	Venue	Opponent	Score	Result
2001	Palacio de Deportes de San Pablo; Seville, Spain	(China) Zhou Mi	5–11, 9–11	Bronze
2003	National Indoor Arena; Birmingham, England	(China) Gong Ruina	11–6, 11–3	Gold
2005	Arrowhead Pond; Anaheim, United States	(China) Xie Xingfang	8–11, 11–9, 3–11	Silver
2006	Palacio de Deportes de la Comunidad; Madrid, Spain	(China) Xie Xingfang	16–21, 14–21	Silver
2007	Putra Indoor Stadium; Kuala Lumpur, Malaysia	(Hong Kong) Wang Chen	11–21, 15–21	Bronze

=== World Cup ===
Women's singles
Year	Venue	Opponent	Score	Result
2005	Olympic Park; Yiyang, China	(China) Xie Xingfang	19–21, 16–21	Silver
2006	Olympic Park, Yiyang, China	(China) Wang Yihan	19–21, 18–21	Bronze

=== Asian Championships ===
Women's singles
Year	Venue	Opponent	Score	Result
1999	Kuala Lumpur Badminton Stadium; Kuala Lumpur, Malaysia	(China) Ye Zhaoying	8–11, 5–11	Silver
2001	PhilSports Arena; Manila, Philippines	(Hong Kong) Wang Chen	11–1, 11–3	Gold
2002	Nimibutr Stadium; Bangkok, Thailand	(China) Zhou Mi	11–6, 3–11, 8–11	Silver

=== Asian Cup ===
Women's singles
Year	Venue	Opponent	Score	Result
1996	Olympic Gymnasium No. 2 Seoul, South Korea	(China) Zeng Yaqiong	5–11, 11–2, 11–4	Gold

=== East Asian Games ===
Women's singles
Year	Venue	Opponent	Score	Result
1993	Shanghai, China	(China) Shen Lianfeng	8–11, 8–11	Bronze

Women's doubles
Year	Venue	Partner	Opponent	Score	Result
1993	Shanghai, China	(China) Qin Yiyuan	(South Korea) Kim Shin-young (South Korea) Shon Hye-joo	12–15, 11–15	Silver

=== BWF Superseries ===
The BWF Superseries, launched on 14 December 2006 and implemented in 2007, is a series of elite badminton tournaments sanctioned by the Badminton World Federation (BWF). BWF Superseries has two levels, the Superseries and Superseries Premier. A season of Superseries features twelve tournaments around the world, introduced in 2011, with successful players invited to the BWF Superseries Finals held at the year's end.

Women's singles
Year	Tournament	Opponent	Score	Result
2007	Swiss Open	(China) Lu Lan	21–16, 21–18	(gold) Winner
2007	Singapore Open	(China) Xie Xingfang	21–18, 19–21, 21–3	(gold) Winner
2007	China Masters	(China) Xie Xingfang	11–21, 21–8, 21–23	(silver) Runner-up
2007	Denmark Open	(China) Lu Lan	17–21, 14–21	(silver) Runner-up
2008	Swiss Open	(China) Xie Xingfang	18–21, 17–21	(silver) Runner-up

BWF Super Series Finals tournament
BWF Super Series Premier tournament
BWF Super Series tournament

=== IBF World Grand Prix ===
The World Badminton Grand Prix sanctioned by International Badminton Federation (IBF) from 1983 to 2006.

Women's singles
Year	Tournament	Opponent	Score	Result
1994	French Open	(China) Liu Yuhong	7–11, 11–7, 11–7	(gold) Winner
1994	Brunei Open	(China) Hu Ning	11–3, 6–11, 11–6	(gold) Winner
1996	Swedish Open	(South Korea) Ra Kyung-min	6–11, 11–2, 11–4	(gold) Winner
1996	Malaysia Open	(China) Wang Chen	11–7, 11–8	(gold) Winner
1996	China Open	(China) Wang Chen	11–6, 11–6	(gold) Winner
1998	All England Open	(China) Ye Zhaoying	5–11, 8–11	(silver) Runner-up
1998	Malaysia Open	(China) Dai Yun	11–1, 11–3	(gold) Winner
1998	World Grand Prix Finals	(China) Dai Yun	11–8, 11–7	(gold) Winner
2001	Singapore Open	(China) Dai Yun	7–1, 4–7, 7–2	(gold) Winner
2002	Korea Open	(China) Gong Ruina	7–0, 5–7, 7–1, 7–2	(gold) Winner
2002	Singapore Open	(China) Zhou Mi	6–11, 3–11	(silver) Runner-up
2002	Indonesia Open	(China) Gong Ruina	6–11, 7–11	(silver) Runner-up
2002	China Open	(China) Gong Ruina	5–11, 8–11	(silver) Runner-up
2003	Swiss Open	(Hong Kong) Wang Chen	Walkover	(gold) Winner
2003	Singapore Open	(China) Zhou Mi	11–0, 11–8	(gold) Winner
2003	German Open	(Denmark) Camilla Martin	11–7, 11–3	(gold) Winner
2003	Hong Kong Open	(China) Gong Ruina	11–5, 11–9	(gold) Winner
2004	Korea Open	(South Korea) Jun Jae-youn	11–6, 11–5	(gold) Winner
2004	Malaysia Open	(China) Zhou Mi	9–11, 11–7, 11–8	(gold) Winner
2004	Singapore Open	(China) Zhou Mi	11–8, 11–1	(gold) Winner
2005	German Open	(China) Xie Xingfang	5–11, 4–11	(silver) Runner-up
2005	All England Open	(China) Xie Xingfang	3–11, 9–11	(silver) Runner-up
2005	Japan Open	(China) Xie Xingfang	11–7, 11–8	(gold) Winner
2005	Singapore Open	(Hong Kong) Zhou Mi	11–5, 11–7	(gold) Winner
2005	Malaysia Open	(China) Zhu Lin	11–6, 11–2	(gold) Winner
2005	China Masters	(Hong Kong) Zhou Mi	11–3, 5–11, 11–3	(gold) Winner
2005	Hong Kong Open	(China) Xie Xingfang	11–4, 1–11, 11–6	(gold) Winner
2005	China Open	(China) Xie Xingfang	3–11, 11–4, 11–8	(gold) Winner
2006	German Open	(China) Lu Lan	11–8, 11–3	(gold) Winner
2006	All England Open	(China) Xie Xingfang	6–11, 11–4, 2–11	(silver) Runner-up
2006	Chinese Taipei Open	(China) Xie Xingfang	21–15, 21–15	(gold) Winner
2006	Malaysia Open	(England) Tracey Hallam	21–12, 21–13	(gold) Winner
2006	Hong Kong Open	(China) Xie Xingfang	Walkover	(silver) Runner-up
2006	Japan Open	(China) Xie Xingfang	21–11, 16–21, 30–29	(gold) Winner
2006	China Open	(Netherlands) Yao Jie	21–14, 21–5	(gold) Winner

Women's doubles
Year	Tournament	Partner	Opponent	Score	Result
1993	Dutch Open	(England) Joanne Goode	(Indonesia) Finarsih (Indonesia) Lili Tampi	9–15, 3–15	(silver) Runner-up
1999	Korea Open	(China) Ge Fei	(China) Huang Nanyan (China) Yang Wei	10–15, 1–15	(silver) Runner-up

IBF Grand Prix tournament
IBF Grand Prix Finals tournament

== Record against selected opponents ==
Record against year-end Finals finalists, World Championships semi-finalists, and Olympic quarter-finalists.

Players	Matches	Results		Difference
Players	Matches	Won	Lost	Difference
(Australia) / (Chinese Taipei) Huang Chia-chi	3	3	0	+3
(Bulgaria) Petya Nedelcheva	4	4	0	+4
(China) Dai Yun	8	6	2	+4
(China) Gong Ruina	9	4	5	–1
(China) Gong Zhichao	4	2	2	0
(China) Han Jingna	2	0	2	–2
(China) Lu Lan	4	3	1	+2
(China) Wang Lin	2	1	1	0
(China) Wang Yihan	4	3	1	+2
(China) Xie Xingfang	23	12	11	+1
(China) Yao Yan	2	1	1	0
(China) Ye Zhaoying	4	0	4	–4
(China) Zhu Lin	3	3	0	+3
(Chinese Taipei) Cheng Shao-chieh	2	2	0	+2
(Denmark) Tine Baun	5	4	1	+3
(Denmark) Camilla Martin	15	9	6	+3
(Denmark) Mette Sørensen	2	2	0	+2

Players	Matches	Results		Difference
Players	Matches	Won	Lost	Difference
(England) Tracey Hallam	6	6	0	+6
(France) Pi Hongyan	17	14	3	+11
(Germany) Petra Overzier	2	2	0	+2
(Germany) Juliane Schenk	5	5	0	+5
(Germany) Xu Huaiwen	3	3	0	+3
(Hong Kong) / (China) Wang Chen	17	14	3	+11
(Hong Kong) Yip Pui Yin	5	4	1	+3
(Hong Kong) / (China) Zhou Mi	20	8	12	–4
(India) Saina Nehwal	1	1	0	+1
(Indonesia) Susi Susanti	6	1	5	–4
(Indonesia) Maria Kristin Yulianti	3	2	1	+1
(Japan) Yasuko Mizui	3	3	0	+3
(Malaysia) Wong Mew Choo	8	7	1	+6
(Netherlands) / (Indonesia) Mia Audina	13	7	6	+1
(South Korea) Bang Soo-hyun	4	0	4	–4
(South Korea) Kim Ji-hyun	2	0	2	–2
(Sweden) Lim Xiaoqing	5	0	5	–5

== Performance timeline ==
Key

W	Won	F	Finalist	SF	Semi-finalist
QF	Quarter-finalist	#R	Rounds 4, 3, 2, 1	RR	Round-robin stage
Q#	Qualification round	A	Absent	w/d	Withdrew
G	Gold	S	Silver	B	Bronze
NH	Not held	N/A	Not applicable	DNQ	Did not qualify

=== National team ===
- Senior level

Team events	1993	1994	1995	1996	1997	1998	1999	2000	2001	2002	2003	2004	2005	2006	2007
Uber Cup	NH	S	NH	S	NH	A	NH	A	NH	A	NH	G	NH	G	NH
Sudirman Cup	A	NH	A	NH	A	NH	A	NH	A	NH	A	NH	G	NH	G
Asian Games	NH	A	NH			G	NH			G	NH			G	NH
East Asian Games	G	NH			A	NH									

=== Individual competitions ===
- Women's singles

Tournaments	1993	1994	1995	1996	1997	1998	1999	2000	2001	2002	2003	2004	2005	2006	2007	2008
Olympic Games	NH			A	NH			A	NH			G	NH			G
World Championships	R64	NH	QF	NH	QF	NH	QF	NH	B	NH	G	NH	S	S	B	NH
World Cup				A		NH							S	B	NH	
Asian Games	NH	A	NH			A	NH			A	NH			QF	NH	
Asian Championships		3R	QF	A			S	A	G	S	A					
Asian Cup	NH			G	NH											
East Asian Games	B	NH			A	NH										

Tournaments	1992	1993	1994	1995	1996	1997	1998	1999	2000	2001	2002	2003	2004	2005	2006	2007	2008
Year-end finals					A	RR	W	RR	A	NH							A
China Open	1R	QF	2R	QF	W	2R	NH	2R	NH	SF	F	QF	QF	W	W	SF	A
All England Open	A		3R	3R	3R	QF	F	A	QF	A	QF	SF	SF	F	F	SF	1R
Japan Open	A				QF	QF	A	QF	1R	SF	SF	QF	SF	W	W	QF	A
Malaysia Open	2R	A	2R	QF	W	A	W	QF	A			QF	W	W	W	A	1R
Singapore Open	2R	NH	3R	A	NH	SF	QF	A	NH	W	F	W	W	W	A	W	A
Hong Kong Open	A	SF	2R	A					NH	A	NH	W	NH	W	F	2R	A
Indonesia Open	2R	A		3R	3R	A					F	QF	A			QF	SF
Korea Open	A				SF	QF	NH	QF	A	2R	W	A	W	A			QF
Denmark Open	A	2R	A						SF	QF	A	SF	A			F	A
German Open	A	1R	A				NH	A				W	A	F	W	A	
Swedish Open	A			1R	W	QF	SF	A		NH							
Swiss Open	A											W	SF	A		W	F
China Masters	NH													W	QF	F	A
Thailand Open	A		QF	A		QF	NH	QF	A		NH	A					
Brunei Open	A		W	A		NH	SF	NH									
Chinese Taipei Open	A						NH	SF	A	NH	A				W	A	
Dutch Open	A	1R	A	NH	A				SF	A							
French Open	A		W	A											NH	SF	A
Canada Open	A			QF	NH			A		NH	A						NH
Macau Open	NH										A	NH			QF	A	
US Open	A			3R	A												

Olympic Games
Preceded by Liu Xiang	Flagbearer for China at the Olympics closing ceremony Beijing 2008	Succeeded by Xu Lijia
