= Shannon Pohl =

American badminton player

Personal information
- Born: 9 November 1980 (age 45) Arlington Heights, IL, United States
- Height: 5'5

Sport
- Country: United States
- Sport: Badminton
- Handedness: Right
- Coached by: Michael Kjeldsen

Women's singles
- Highest ranking: 69
Medal record
Representing United States
Women's badminton
Pan American Championships
Bronze medal – third place	2008 Peru	Singles

Shannon Pohl (born 9 November 1980) is a badminton player from the United States.

== Career ==
Shannon was the highest-ranked American badminton player in the world in women's singles in 2009. Her top ranking is #69 in the world in women's singles. Shannon was a member of the United States World Championship Badminton Team in 2005, 2006, 2007 and 2009. She has represented the United States in badminton tournaments in 46 countries.

She played at the 2005 World Badminton Championships in Anaheim and reached the round of 32.

== Coaching ==
Shannon is currently head coach and director of the Shannon Pohl Badminton Academy in Vernon Hills, IL. She is a USA Badminton Level 2 Elite Talent Coach and she was the US Assistant National Coach for the 2010 Jr. Pan American Championships.
