= Gong Ruina =

Chinese badminton player

Gong Ruina 龚睿那
Personal information
- Born: January 23, 1981 (age 45) Anhua County, Hunan, China
- Height: 1.70 m (5 ft 7 in)
- Weight: 60 kg (132 lb)

Sport
- Country: China
- Sport: Badminton
- Handedness: Right

Women's singles
- Highest ranking: 1
- BWF profile
Medal record
Women's badminton
Representing China
World Championships
Gold medal – first place	2001 Seville	Women's singles
Silver medal – second place	2003 Birmingham	Women's singles
Bronze medal – third place	1999 Copenhagen	Women's singles
Sudirman Cup
Silver medal – second place	2003 Eindhoven	Mixed team
Uber Cup
Gold medal – first place	2004 Jakarta	Women's team
Gold medal – first place	2002 Guangzhou	Women's team
Gold medal – first place	2000 Kuala Lumpur	Women's team
Asian Games
Gold medal – first place	2002 Busan	Women's team
Silver medal – second place	2002 Busan	Women's singles
Asian Championships
Bronze medal – third place	1998 Bangkok	Women's singles
World Junior Championships
Gold medal – first place	1998 Melbourne	Girls' singles
Silver medal – second place	1998 Melbourne	Girls' doubles
Asia Junior Championships
Gold medal – first place	1998 Kuala Lumpur	Girls' doubles
Gold medal – first place	1998 Kuala Lumpur	Girls' team
Gold medal – first place	1997 Manila	Girls' singles
Gold medal – first place	1997 Manila	Girls' team
Silver medal – second place	1998 Kuala Lumpur	Girls' singles
Bronze medal – third place	1997 Manila	Mixed doubles

Gong Ruina (simplified Chinese: 龚睿那; traditional Chinese: 龔睿那; pinyin: Gōng Ruìnà; born on 23 January 1981) is a badminton player from the People's Republic of China.

== Career ==
Gong Ruina was one of the world's leading women's singles players, former World No. 1 in the first few years of the 21st century. She won a number of top tier international titles including the 2001 IBF World Championships in Seville, Spain and the venerable All-England Championships (2004). In both of these events she defeated fellow countrywoman Zhou Mi, one of her principal rivals, in the finals. On the other hand, Gong was beaten by Zhou in the final of the Asian Games (2002), and was denied a bronze medal by her at the 2004 Athens Olympics after each had been beaten in the semifinals.

Gong played singles for China's world champion Uber Cup (women's international) teams of 2002 and 2004. Her other individual titles included the Brunei (1998), Swedish (1999), Malaysia (2001), China (2002), Indonesia (2002), Denmark (2003), and Swiss (2004) Opens. She was a bronze medalist at the 1999 IBF World Championships in Copenhagen, and a silver medalist behind fellow countrywoman Zhang Ning at the 2003 IBF World Championships in Birmingham, England.

Gong retired in the prime of her career to explore other opportunities in her life in June 2005. She once lived in Hong Kong with her husband, a Chinese entrepreneur who has a company in Hong Kong, and with her two children. She now works as the head coach of the Hunan province amateur badminton team.

== Achievements ==
=== World Championships ===
Women's singles
Year	Venue	Opponent	Score	Result
2003	National Indoor Arena; Birmingham, England	(China) Zhang Ning	6–11, 3–11	Silver
2001	Palacio de Deportes de San Pablo; Seville, Spain	(China) Zhou Mi	11–9, 11–4	Gold
1999	Brøndby Arena; Copenhagen, Denmark	(Denmark) Camilla Martin	11–6, 9–11, 3–11	Bronze

=== Asian Games ===
Women's singles
Year	Venue	Opponent	Score	Result
2002	Gangseo Gymnasium; Busan, South Korea	(China) Zhou Mi	1–11, 1–11	Silver

=== Asian Championships ===
Women's singles
Year	Venue	Opponent	Score	Result
1998	Bangkok, Thailand	(China) Gong Zhichao	5–11, 5–11	Bronze

=== World Junior Championships ===
Girls' singles
Year	Venue	Opponent	Score	Result
1998	Sports and Aquatic Centre; Melbourne, Australia	(China) Hu Ting	3–11, 13–10, 11–7	Gold

Girls' doubles
Year	Venue	Partner	Opponent	Score	Result
1998	Sports and Aquatic Centre; Melbourne, Australia	(China) Huang Sui	(China) Zhang Jiewen (China) Xie Xingfang	15–3, 13–15, 10–15	Silver

=== Asian Junior Championships ===
Girls' singles
Year	Venue	Opponent	Score	Result
1998	Kuala Lumpur Badminton Stadium; Kuala Lumpur, Malaysia	(China) Hu Ting	6–11, 2–11	Silver
1997	Ninoy Aquino Stadium; Manila, Philippines	(China) Zhou Mi	11–5, 11–5	Gold

Girls' doubles
Year	Venue	Partner	Opponent	Score	Result
1998	Kuala Lumpur Badminton Stadium; Kuala Lumpur, Malaysia	(China) Huang Sui	(South Korea) Lee Hyo-jung (South Korea) Jun Woul-sihk	15–13, 15–8	Gold

Mixed doubles
Year	Venue	Partner	Opponent	Score	Result
1997	Ninoy Aquino Stadium; Manila, Philippines	(China) Jiang Shan	(China) Cheng Rui (China) Gao Ling	6–15, 5–15	Bronze

=== IBF World Grand Prix ===
The World Badminton Grand Prix sanctioned by International Badminton Federation (IBF) since 1983.

Women's singles
Year	Tournament	Opponent	Score	Result
2004	Japan Open	(Netherlands) Mia Audina	11–7, 7–11, 7–11	(silver) Runner-up
2004	All England Open	(China) Zhou Mi	11–7, 11–7	(gold) Winner
2004	Swiss Open	(Netherlands) Mia Audina	13–11, 11–0	(gold) Winner
2003	China Open	(China) Zhou Mi	10–13, 1–11	(silver) Runner-up
2003	Hong Kong Open	(China) Zhang Ning	5–11, 9–11	(silver) Runner-up
2003	Denmark Open	(China) Zhou Mi	4–11, 13–10, 11–3	(gold) Winner
2002	China Open	(China) Zhang Ning	11–5, 11–8	(gold) Winner
2002	Denmark Open	(Denmark) Camilla Martin	5–11, 11–3, 7–11	(silver) Runner-up
2002	Indonesia Open	(China) Zhang Ning	11–6, 11–7	(gold) Winner
2002	Korea Open	(China) Zhang Ning	0–7, 7–5, 1–7, 2–7	(silver) Runner-up
2001	China Open	(China) Zhou Mi	2–7, 0–7, 4–7	(silver) Runner-up
2001	Malaysia Open	(China) Zhou Mi	7–3, 7–2, 7–4	(gold) Winner
2001	Japan Open	(China) Zhou Mi	8–11, 0–11	(silver) Runner-up
2000	Dutch Open	(China) Zhou Mi	7–11, 11–9, 8–11	(silver) Runner-up
2000	Swiss Open	(China) Dai Yun	5–11, 12–13	(silver) Runner-up
1999	China Open	(China) Zhou Mi	6–11, 5–11	(silver) Runner-up
1999	Thailand Open	(China) Dai Yun	6–11, 5–11	(silver) Runner-up
1999	Malaysia Open	(China) Dai Yun	6–11, 3–11	(silver) Runner-up
1999	Swedish Open	(South Korea) Kim Ji-hyun	11–8, 11–5	(gold) Winner
1999	Korea Open	(China) Zhou Mi	6–11, 12–13	(silver) Runner-up
1998	Brunei Open	(China) Zhou Mi	11–7, 11–4	(gold) Winner
1997	Hong Kong Open	(China) Wu Huimin	11–3, 8–11, 11–5	(gold) Winner

== Record against selected opponents ==
Record against year-end Finals finalists, World Championships semi-finalists, and Olympic quarter-finalists.

Players	Matches	Results		Difference
Players	Matches	Won	Lost	Difference
(China) Dai Yun	6	2	4	–2
(China) Gong Zhichao	5	2	3	–1
(China) Han Jingna	1	1	0	+1
(China) Xie Xingfang	6	3	3	0
(China) Xu Huaiwen	2	2	0	+2
(China) Ye Zhaoying	4	1	3	–2
(China) Zhang Ning	9	5	4	+1
(China) Zhou Mi	24	12	12	0
(Chinese Taipei) Cheng Shao-chieh	1	1	0	+1
(Chinese Taipei) Huang Chia-chi	3	3	0	+3
(Denmark) Tine Baun	3	3	0	+3
(Denmark) Camilla Martin	10	3	7	–4

Players	Matches	Results		Difference
Players	Matches	Won	Lost	Difference
(Denmark) Mette Sørensen	2	1	1	0
(England) Tracey Hallam	4	4	0	+4
(France) Pi Hongyan	2	2	0	+2
(Germany) Petra Overzier	3	3	0	+3
(Germany) Juliane Schenk	3	3	0	+3
(Hong Kong) / (China) Wang Chen	10	6	4	+2
(Indonesia) Mia Audina	8	5	3	+2
(Indonesia) Susi Susanti	2	1	1	0
(Indonesia) Maria Kristin Yulianti	1	1	0	+1
(Japan) Yasuko Mizui	3	3	0	+3
(Malaysia) Wong Mew Choo	1	1	0	+1
(South Korea) Kim Ji-hyun	3	2	1	+1

== Footnotes ==
1. Some sources give 龚睿娜.
2. The pronunciation of this name might also be Gōng Ruìnǎ. Please verify.
