= 2005 IBF World Championships =

Tournament details
- Dates: 15–21 August
- Edition: 14th
- Level: International
- Venue: Arrowhead Pond
- Location: Anaheim, United States

The 2005 IBF World Championships (14th World Badminton Championships) was held in Anaheim, southern California, United States, from August 15 to August 21, 2005.

2004 Olympic champion Taufik Hidayat of Indonesia won the men's singles over China's Lin Dan, while Peter Gade of Denmark and Lee Chong Wei of Malaysia received bronze medals.

In the women's singles category, Xie Xingfang won the gold medal beating compatriot 2004 Olympic gold medalist Zhang Ning. Germany's Xu Huaiwen and Chinese Taipei's Cheng Shao-chieh won bronze medals. Cheng Shao-chieh also created some surprise results in the tournament.

Women's doubles was almost an all-China show. 2004 Olympic gold medalists Yang Wei/Zhang Jiewen repeated their 2004 Olympic performance with victory over silver medalists Gao Ling/Huang Sui.

In the mixed doubles, number 1 seeds Nathan Robertson/Gail Emms of England backed out before commencement of the tournament due to an injury to Robertson. This paved the way for several pairs to contest the medals. Indonesia's Nova Widianto and Liliyana Natsir secured the gold over China's up and coming Xie Zhongbo/Zhang Yawen. Zhang Yawen also become the only double medalist in this games winning the silver in mixed doubles and bronze in the women's doubles.

The biggest surprise in the tournament came in men's doubles. Though former Indonesian star Tony Gunawan had long been recognized as one of the premier men's doubles players in the game, he and his American partner Howard Bach were only the 13th seeded team in the competition. However, from the round of 16 through the semifinal they routinely defeated higher seeded pairs to reach the final. There, before a surprisingly large "hometown crowd", they overcame the second seeded Indonesian team of Sigit Budiarto and Candra Wijaya in three close games to become the first American winners of any event since the IBF first held an official World Championships in 1977.

== Host city selection ==
Anaheim (United States) and Aarhus (Denmark) were the candidates for the host of the championships. Singapore withdrew its bid before the council meeting which later awarded the event to Anaheim.

== Venue ==
The championships were held at the Arrowhead Pond of Anaheim, now known as Honda Center.

== Medalists ==
China had an excellent tournament, winning seven medals in total, including the gold medals in the women's singles and women's doubles, as well as four of the five silvers. Indonesia won both the men's singles and mixed doubles. The men's doubles tournament was won by the 13th seeds, Tony Gunawan and Howard Bach, winning the United States's first ever gold at the World Championships.

=== Medal table ===
* Host nation (United States)

Rank	Nation	Gold	Silver	Bronze	Total
1	China	2	4	1	7
2	Indonesia	2	1	1	4
3	United States*	1	0	0	1
4	Malaysia	0	0	2	2
5	Chinese Taipei	0	0	1	1
5	Denmark	0	0	1	1
5	Germany	0	0	1	1
5	New Zealand	0	0	1	1
5	South Korea	0	0	1	1
5	Thailand	0	0	1	1
Totals (10 entries)		5	5	10	20

=== Events ===
Event	Gold	Silver	Bronze
Men's singles	(Indonesia) Taufik Hidayat	(China) Lin Dan	(Denmark) Peter Gade
Men's singles	(Indonesia) Taufik Hidayat	(China) Lin Dan	(Malaysia) Lee Chong Wei
Women's Singles	(China) Xie Xingfang	(China) Zhang Ning	(Germany) Xu Huaiwen
Women's Singles	(China) Xie Xingfang	(China) Zhang Ning	(Chinese Taipei) Cheng Shao-chieh
Men's Doubles	(United States) Howard Bach (United States) Tony Gunawan	(Indonesia) Sigit Budiarto (Indonesia) Candra Wijaya	(Indonesia) Luluk Hadiyanto (Indonesia) Alvent Yulianto
Men's Doubles	(United States) Howard Bach (United States) Tony Gunawan	(Indonesia) Sigit Budiarto (Indonesia) Candra Wijaya	(Malaysia) Chan Chong Ming (Malaysia) Koo Kien Keat
Women's Doubles	(China) Yang Wei (China) Zhang Jiewen	(China) Gao Ling (China) Huang Sui	(China) Zhang Dan (China) Zhang Yawen
Women's Doubles	(China) Yang Wei (China) Zhang Jiewen	(China) Gao Ling (China) Huang Sui	(South Korea) Lee Hyo-jung (South Korea) Lee Kyung-won
Mixed Doubles	(Indonesia) Nova Widianto (Indonesia) Liliyana Natsir	(China) Xie Zhongbo (China) Zhang Yawen	(New Zealand) Daniel Shirley (New Zealand) Sara Runesten-Petersen
Mixed Doubles	(Indonesia) Nova Widianto (Indonesia) Liliyana Natsir	(China) Xie Zhongbo (China) Zhang Yawen	(Thailand) Sudket Prapakamol (Thailand) Saralee Thungthongkam

== Participating nations ==
A total of 50 nations entered players at the 2005 IBF World Championships. The number of competitors is indicated in parentheses.

- Austria [3]
- Belgium [3]
- Bulgaria [3]
- Canada [14]
- China [21]
- Chinese Taipei [4]
- Czech Republic [4]
- Denmark [16]
- England [18]
- Estonia [3]
- Finland [3]
- France [10]
- Germany [8]
- Guatemala [2]
- Hong Kong [8]
- Iceland [2]
- India [4]
- Indonesia [10]
- Iran [3]
- Ireland [4]
- Israel [1]
- Italy [2]
- Japan [20]
- Lithuania [1]
- Malaysia [21]
- Netherlands [7]
- New Zealand [11]
- Nigeria [2]
- Norway [1]
- Pakistan [4]
- Peru [5]
- Philippines [2]
- Poland [5]
- Russia [4]
- Scotland [9]
- Singapore [10]
- Slovenia [8]
- South Africa [3]
- South Korea [11]
- Spain [6]
- Sri Lanka [1]
- Suriname [2]
- Sweden [7]
- Switzerland [4]
- Thailand [10]
- Trinidad and Tobago [2]
- Ukraine [3]
- United States [15]
- Vietnam [1]
- Wales [2]
