= Jill Pittard =

English badminton player (born 1977)

Jill PIttard
Personal information
- Born: 5 September 1977 (age 48) Coventry, England

Sport
- Country: England
- Sport: Badminton
- Handedness: Right
- Coached by: Andy Wood, Yvette Yun Luo, Lorraine Cole

Women's singles
- Highest ranking: 43 (12 November 2009)
- BWF profile
Medal record
Women's badminton
Representing England
Sudirman Cup
Bronze medal – third place	2007 Glasgow	Mixed team
European Women's Team Championships
Silver medal – second place	2006 Thessalonica	Women's team

Jill Pittard (born 5 September 1977) is a badminton player from England.

== Career ==
All matches in the following incomplete list were in women's singles.

- 2009 Portugal International: winner
- 2009 Le Volant d'Or de Toulouse: finalist
- 2007 BWF World Championships: defeated in the first round by Kaori Mori, of Japan, 21–13, 21–16
- 2007 National Championships: finalist, defeated by Elizabeth Cann, 21–19, 21–17
- 2006 National Championships: finalist, defeated by Tracey Hallam, 8–11, 11–4, 11–0
- Winner, 2006/07 European Badminton Circuit
- 2004 Austrian Open: defeated 16th-ranked Miho Tanaka of Japan in the quarter-finals
- 2004 Scottish Open: finalist
- 2003 Slovenian International: winner
- 1998 Iceland International: winner

Pittard has twelve caps for England.
