= Kanako Yonekura =

Japanese badminton player

Personal information
- Born: 29 October 1976 (age 50) Kodaira, Tokyo
- Height: 1.66 m (5 ft 5 1/2 in)
- Weight: 57 kg (126 lb; 9.0 st)

Sport
- Country: Japan
- Sport: Badminton
- Handedness: Right
- BWF profile
Medal record
Women's badminton
Representing Japan
Uber Cup
Bronze medal – third place	2004 Jakarta	Women's team
Asian Games
Gold medal – first place	1998 Bangkok	Women's singles
Silver medal – second place	2006 Doha	Women's team
Bronze medal – third place	1998 Bangkok	Women's team
Asian Championships
Bronze medal – third place	2004 Kuala Lumpur	Women's singles
East Asian Games
Bronze medal – third place	1997 Busan	Women's team
World University Championships
Silver medal – second place	1996 Strasbourg	Women's singles
Bronze medal – third place	1996 Strasbourg	Women's doubles

Kanako Yonekura (米倉加奈子, Yonekura Kanako; born 29 October 1976 in Kodaira, Tokyo) is a badminton player from Japan.

Yonekura won the gold in women's singles of the badminton tournament in the 1998 Bangkok Asian Games, by defeating Gong Zhichao of People's Republic of China in the final.

She played badminton at the 2004 Summer Olympics, losing to Camilla Martin of Denmark in the round of 32.

== Career ==
At the 1997 Chinese Taipei International, Yonekura finished runner-up to Chan Ya-lin.

== Achievements ==
=== Asian Games ===
Women's singles

Year	Venue	Opponent	Score	Result
1998	Thammasat Gymnasium 2 Bangkok, Thailand	(China) Gong Zhichao	1–11, 11–5, 11–6	Gold

=== Asian Championships ===
Women's singles

Year	Venue	Opponent	Score	Result	Ref.
2004	Kuala Lumpur Badminton Stadium; Kuala Lumpur, Malaysia	(South Korea) Jun Jae-youn	2–11, 5–11	Bronze	

=== World University Championships ===
Women's singles

Year	Venue	Opponent	Score	Result	Ref.
1996	Strasbourg, France	(South Korea) Choi Ma-ree	0–11, 12–10, 10–12	Silver	

Women's doubles

Year	Venue	Partner	Opponent	Score	Result	Ref.
1996	Strasbourg, France	(Japan) Saori Itoh	(China) Gao Leng (China) Gao Yuan	1–15, 12–15	Bronze	

=== IBF World Grand Prix ===
The World Badminton Grand Prix has been sanctioned by the International Badminton Federation since 1983.

Women's singles

Year	Tournament	Opponent	Score	Result	Ref.
2000	Korea Open	(Denmark) Camilla Martin	6–11, 6–11	(silver) Runner-up	
2000	Swedish Open	(Thailand) Sujitra Ekmongkolpaisarn	11–9, 10–13, 13–10	(gold) Winner	
2003	Thailand Open	(China) Dai Yun	7–11, 8–11	(silver) Runner-up	

=== BWF International Challenge/Series ===
Women's singles

Year	Tournament	Opponent	Score	Result	Ref.
1997	Chinese Taipei International	(Chinese Taipei) Chan Ya-lin	4–11, 8–11	(silver) Runner-up	
2000	Australia Capital International	(China) Wang Chen	6–11, 8–11	(silver) Runner-up	
2000	Waitakere International	(China) Wang Chen	1–11, 2–11	(silver) Runner-up	
2003	Mauritius International	(France) Pi Hongyan	11–5, 10–13, 4–11	(silver) Runner-up	
2003	South Africa International	(France) Pi Hongyan	11–6, 4–11, 9–11	(silver) Runner-up	
2003	Waikato International	(Japan) Kaori Mori	11–4, 11–2	(gold) Winner	
2003	Southern Panam Classic	(Wales) Kelly Morgan	11–2, 11–3	(gold) Winner	
2007	Osaka International	(Japan) Eriko Hirose	14–21, 11–21	(silver) Runner-up	
2007	Australian Open	(Japan) Chie Umezu	11–21, 21–11, 21–10	(gold) Winner	
2007	White Nights	(Belarus) Olga Konon	21–11, 21–7	(gold) Winner	
2007	Scottish Open	(England) Elizabeth Cann	21–19, 18–21, 21–17	(gold) Winner	
2007	India International	(India) Saina Nehwal	21–13, 21–18	(gold) Winner	

BWF International Challenge tournament
BWF International Series tournament
