= Kaori Mori =

Japanese badminton player

Personal information
- Born: August 23, 1979 (age 47) Kitakyushu, Fukuoka, Japan
- Height: 1.57 m (5 ft 2 in)
- Weight: 50 kg (110 lb)

Sport
- Country: Japan
- Sport: Badminton
- Handedness: Right

Women's Singles
- Highest ranking: 7 (27 September 2005)
- BWF profile
Medal record
Women's badminton
Representing Japan
Uber Cup
Bronze medal – third place	2004 Jakarta	Women's team
Asian Games
Silver medal – second place	2006 Doha	Women's team
Asian Championships
Silver medal – second place	2006 Johor Bahru	Women's singles
Silver medal – second place	2005 Hyderabad	Women's singles
Bronze medal – third place	2004 Kuala Lumpur	Women's singles
Asian Junior Championships
Bronze medal – third place	1997 Manila	Women's team

Kaori Mori (森 かおり, Mori Kaori; born on August 23, 1979, in Fukuoka Prefecture) is a former Japanese badminton player. She was the women's singles national champion in 2001 and 2003. Mori won the bronze medal at the 2004 Asian Championships and also the silver medals in 2005 and 2006. She played badminton at the 2004 Summer Olympics, defeating Anu Weckström of Finland in the first round but losing to Zhou Mi of China in the round of 16. She also helps the Japanese women's team to win bronze at the 2004 Uber Cup in Jakarta, Indonesia.

== Career ==
Mori began playing badminton at the age of eight, influenced by her mother and practicing alongside her twin sister. She won the singles title at the National Junior High School Championships. While attending Kyushu International University High School, she finished runner-up in singles at the Inter-High School Championships in 1995 and was runner-up in both singles and doubles in 1996. Internationally, she won a bronze medal with the Japanese girls' team at the 1997 Asian Junior Championships in Manila.

After graduating from high school, Mori joined the Sanyo Electric corporate badminton team. She placed third in women's singles at the All Japan Championships in 1998, and finished runner-up in 2000. She also competed internationally in women's doubles with Megumi Oniike, reaching the semifinals of the Dutch Open in 2000.

In 2001, Mori reached the women's singles semifinals at the Japan Open, making her the first Japanese player to reach that stage of the tournament in 14 years. Domestically, she captured two national women's singles titles at the All Japan Championships, winning in 2001 and 2003. On the international circuit in 2003, Mori won the singles title at the Slovak International, defeating Petya Nedelcheva in the final, and finished as runner-up at both the Waikato International and Western Australia International.

In April 2004, Mori won a bronze medal in the women's singles at the Asian Championships in Kuala Lumpur, losing to Wang Chen in the semifinals. The following month, she helped Japan win a bronze medal in the women's team event at the 2004 Uber Cup in Jakarta.

In 2004, Mori represented Japan in the women's singles at the Badminton at the 2004 Summer Olympics in Athens. In the opening round, she defeated Finland's Anu Weckström in straight games. She was eliminated in the second round by China's Zhou Mi, making her the only Japanese women's singles player to advance past the opening round at the tournament.

At the 2005 Asian Championships in Hyderabad, Mori reached the women's singles final, where she lost to Wang Chen to earn the silver medal. Later that year, Mori reached the women's singles quarterfinals at the 2005 World Championships in Anaheim, where she was defeated by defending Olympic and world champion Zhang Ning. She reached the final again at the 2006 Asian Championships in Johor Bahru, finishing runner-up to Wang for the second consecutive year. Later in 2006, Mori helped Japan win the silver medal in the women's team event at the Asian Games in Doha.

In December 2007, Mori reached the women's singles final at the Irish International, finishing as runner-up to Elizabeth Cann. In April 2009, she partnered Aya Wakisaka to reach the women's doubles final at the Osaka International, where they finished runners-up to Misaki Matsutomo and Ayaka Takahashi.

After retiring from competitive play, Mori became an assistant coach of the Sanyo Electric badminton team. She later worked as a coach for Japan's under-16 junior national team. She has also served as a Mizuno badminton advisory staff member and appeared as a guest player at the 2019 Mizuno Omotenashi Cup Japan.

== Achievements ==
=== Asian Championships ===
Women's singles
Year	Venue	Opponent	Score	Result	Ref.
2004	Kuala Lumpur Badminton Stadium; Kuala Lumpur, Malaysia	(Hong Kong) Wang Chen	4–11, 2–11	Bronze	
2005	Gachibowli Indoor Stadium; Hyderabad, India	(Hong Kong) Wang Chen	8–11, 4–11	Silver	
2006	Bandaraya Stadium; Johor Bahru, Malaysia	(Hong Kong) Wang Chen	14–21, 21–9, 13–21	Silver	

=== BWF International Challenge/Series (1 title, 4 runners-up) ===
Women's singles
Year	Tournament	Opponent	Score	Result	Ref.
2003	Waikato International	(Japan) Kanako Yonekura	4–11, 2–11	(silver) Runner-up	
2003	Western Australia International	(Japan) Miho Tanaka	8–11, 10–13	(silver) Runner-up	
2003	Slovak International	(Bulgaria) Petya Nedelcheva	11–6, 11–6	(gold) Winner	
2007	Irish International	(England) Elizabeth Cann	19–21, 9–21	(silver) Runner-up	

Women's doubles
Year	Tournament	Partner	Opponent	Score	Result	Ref.
2009	Osaka International	(Japan) Aya Wakisaka	(Japan) Misaki Matsutomo (Japan) Ayaka Takahashi	16–21, 21–16, 22–24	(silver) Runner-up	

BWF International Challenge tournament
BWF International Series tournament
