= Jun Jae-youn =

South Korean badminton player

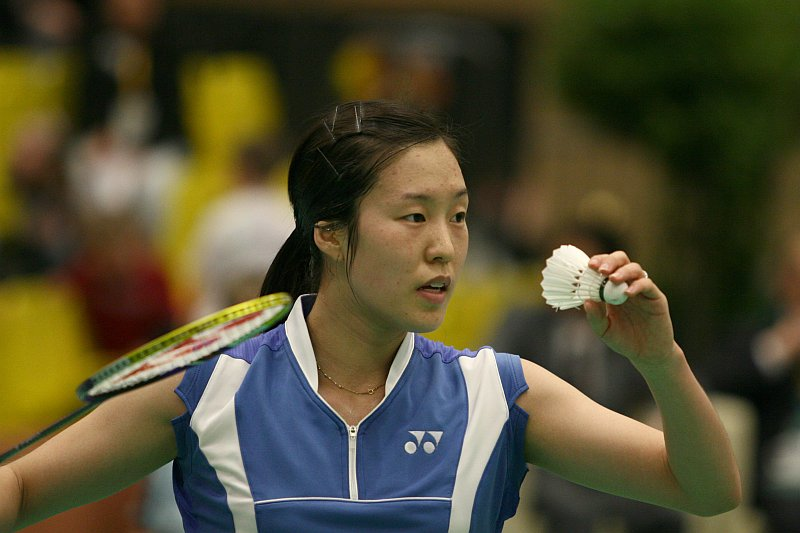

Personal information
- Born: 전재연; 9 February 1983 (age 43) Pocheon, South Korea
- Height: 1.69 m (5 ft 7 in)
- Weight: 58 kg (128 lb)

Sport
- Country: South Korea
- Sport: Badminton
- Handedness: Right

Women's singles
- Current ranking: Retired
- BWF profile
Medal record
Women's badminton
Representing South Korea
Sudirman Cup
Gold medal – first place	2003 Eindhoven	Mixed team
Bronze medal – third place	2001 Sevilla	Mixed team
Uber Cup
Silver medal – second place	2004 Jakarta	Women's team
Asian Games
Silver medal – second place	2002 Busan	Women's team
Bronze medal – third place	2006 Doha	Women's team
Asian Championships
Gold medal – first place	2004 Kuala Lumpur	Women's singles
World Junior Championships
Silver medal – second place	2000 Guangzhou	Mixed team
Asian Junior Championships
Gold medal – first place	2001 Taipei	Girls' singles
Gold medal – first place	2001 Taipei	Girls' team
Silver medal – second place	2000 Kyoto	Girls' team
Silver medal – second place	1998 Kuala Lumpur	Girls' team
Bronze medal – third place	1999 Yangon	Girls' team

- Korean name
- Hangul: 전재연
- Hanja: 全在娟
- RR: Jeon Jaeyeon
- MR: Chŏn Chaeyŏn

Jun Jae-Youn or Jeon Jae-Yeon (born 9 February 1983) is a South Korean badminton player. Born in Pocheon, Jun was part of the Korea National Sport University. She was the champion at the 2004 Asian Championships in the women's singles event. She played badminton at the 2004 Summer Olympics for South Korea, defeating Charmaine Reid of Canada in the first round but losing to Cheng Shao-chieh of Chinese Taipei in the round of 16. At the 2005 Swiss Open, she was suffered a rupture of the knee cruciate ligament injury at the match against Xu Huaiwen of Germany in the quarter-finals round. Jun also competed at the Olympic Games for the second time at the 2008 Beijing and reach in to the third round. She beat Kamila Augustyn and Chloe Magee in the first and two rounds, but was defeated by Zhang Ning in the straight games.

== Achievements ==
=== Asian Championships ===
Women's singles
Year	Venue	Opponent	Score	Result
2004	Kuala Lumpur Badminton Stadium; Kuala Lumpur, Malaysia	(Hong Kong) Wang Chen	11–9, 11–7	Gold

=== Asian Junior Championships ===
Girls' singles
Year	Venue	Opponent	Score	Result
2001	Taipei Gymnasium; Taipei, Taiwan	(South Korea) Seo Yoon-hee	11–8, 8–11, 11–6	Gold

=== BWF Grand Prix ===
The BWF Grand Prix has two level such as Grand Prix and Grand Prix Gold. It is a series of badminton tournaments, sanctioned by Badminton World Federation (BWF) since 2007. The World Badminton Grand Prix sanctioned by International Badminton Federation (IBF) since 1983.

Women's singles
Year	Tournament	Opponent	Score	Result
2008	German Open	(China) Wang Yihan	25–23, 21–10	(gold) Winner
2007	Macau Open	(China) Xie Xingfang	10–21, 10–21	(silver) Runner-up
2007	U.S. Open	(South Korea) Lee Yun-hwa	21–18, 21–16	(gold) Winner
2005	Korea Open	(Hong Kong) Wang Chen	11–7, 11–8	(gold) Winner
2004	Korea Open	(China) Zhang Ning	6–11, 5–11	(silver) Runner-up
2004	Thailand Open	(Netherlands) Yao Jie	8–11, 11–2, 6–11	(silver) Runner-up
2001	Hong Kong Open	(Thailand) Sujitra Ekmongkolpaisarn	4–7, 6–8, 0–7	(silver) Runner-up

BWF Grand Prix Gold tournament
BWF Grand Prix tournament

=== BWF International Challenge/Series/Satellite ===
Women's singles
Year	Tournament	Opponent	Score	Result
2007	Canadian International	(South Korea) Lee Yun-hwa	21–23, 21–16, 14–21	(silver) Runner-up
2007	Cheers Asian Satellite	(South Korea) Bae Youn-joo	21–8, 21–8	(gold) Winner

BWF International Challenge tournament
BWF International Series tournament
