= Tracey Hallam =

English badminton player

Personal information
- Born: 24 March 1975 (age 51) Burton-on-Trent, England
- Height: 160 cm (5 ft 3 in)

Sport
- Country: England
- Sport: Badminton
- Handedness: Left
- Coached by: Ian Wright and Yvette Yun Luo

Women's Singles
- Highest ranking: 7
- BWF profile
Medal record
Women's badminton
Representing England
Sudirman Cup
Bronze medal – third place	2007 Glasgow	Mixed team
Commonwealth Games
Gold medal – first place	1998 Kuala Lumpur	Women's team
Gold medal – first place	2002 Manchester	Mixed team
Gold medal – first place	2006 Melbourne	Women's singles
Silver medal – second place	2002 Manchester	Women's singles
Silver medal – second place	2006 Melbourne	Mixed team
Bronze medal – third place	1998 Kuala Lumpur	Women's singles
European Women's Team Championships
Silver medal – second place	2006 Thessaloniki	Women's team

Tracey Jayne Hallam (born 24 March 1975) is a former English badminton player.

== Career ==
Hallam played badminton at the 2004 Summer Olympics. In women's singles, she defeated Juliane Schenk of Germany and Camilla Martin of Denmark in the first two rounds. In the quarterfinals, Hallam lost to Mia Audina of the Netherlands 11–0, 11–9.

At the 1998 Commonwealth Games, Hallam won the gold in the women's team event and bronze in the singles event. At the 2002 Commonwealth Games, she won the gold in the mixed team event and silver in the singles event. She won gold in the women's singles at the 2006 Commonwealth Games.

She participated in the 2008 Beijing Olympics in the Women's singles event but she was knocked out in the third round by Xu Huaiwen of Germany (21–10, 21–7).

== Achievements ==
=== Commonwealth Games ===
Women's singles

Year	Venue	Opponent	Score	Result
2006	Melbourne Convention and Exhibition Centre, Melbourne, Australia	(Malaysia) Wong Mew Choo	21–12, 21–15	Gold
2002	Bolton Arena, Manchester, England	(Singapore) Li Li	5–7, 7–5, 7–8, 0–7	Silver
1998	Kuala Lumpur Badminton Stadium, Kuala Lumpur, Malaysia	(Wales) Kelly Morgan	6–11, 4–11	Bronze

=== World University Championships ===
Women's doubles

Year	Venue	Partner	Opponent	Score	Result
1996	Strasbourg, France	(England) Gail Emms	(Chinese Taipei) Tsai Hui Min (Chinese Taipei) Chen Li Jin	12–15, 17–15, 11–15	Bronze

=== Grand Prix ===
Women's singles

Year	Tournament	Opponent	Score	Result
2005	Chinese Taipei Open	(South Korea) Seo Yoon-hee	11–9, 11–7	(gold) Winner
2001	Thailand Open	(Sweden) Marina Andrievskaya	0–7, 7–3, 7–4, 4–7, 7–1	(gold) Winner

BWF Grand Prix tournament

=== International Challenge/Series/Satellite/European Circuit ===
Women's singles

Year	Tournament	Opponent	Score	Result
2013	Auckland International	(England) Fontaine Mica Chapman	21–15, 21–16	(gold) Winner
2007	Le Volant d'Or de Toulouse	(Canada) Anna Rice	21–18, 21–15	(gold) Winner
2007	Vietnam International	(Indonesia) Maria Elfira Christina	21–15, 21–15	(gold) Winner
2007	Hatzor International	(Ukraine) Elena Prus	21–9, 21–15	(gold) Winner
2007	Banuinvest International	(Indonesia) Rosaria Yusfin Pungkasari	21–14, 21–14	(gold) Winner
2004	Portugal International	(Russia) Ella Karachkova	7–11, 11–4, 11–9	(gold) Winner
2001	Austrian International	(Netherlands) Karina de Wit	11–9, 11–5	(gold) Winner
2001	Spanish International	(Poland) Katarzyna Krasowska	11–3, 10–13, 11–0	(gold) Winner
2000	Slovak International	(Poland) Kamila Augustyn	11–9, 11–1	(gold) Winner
1997	Portugal International	(Scotland) Anne Gibson	10–12, 4–11	(silver) Runner-up
1996	Hungarian International	(Sweden) Johanna Holgersson	11–2, 11–1	(gold) Winner
