= 2011 BWF Super Series =

Badminton championships

Tournament details
- Dates: 18 January – 18 December 2011
- Edition: 5th

The 2011 BWF Super Series was the fifth season of the BWF Super Series. This season marked the beginning of a three-year cycle of the event, the second after the first four-year one from 2007 to 2010. A few changes were announced by the Badminton World Federation (BWF), as the India Open was promoted up one stage from the Grand Prix Gold level, while the Swiss Open was dropped from the Super Series. Five tournaments were promoted to become slightly higher-level Super Series Premier events with more prize money awarded than in the Super Series tournaments.

The Masters Finals were held in Liuzhou, China from December 14–18, 2011.

== Schedule ==
Below is the schedule released by the Badminton World Federation:

Tour	Official title	Venue	City	Date		Prize money USD	Report
Tour	Official title	Venue	City	Start	Finish	Prize money USD	Report
1	Malaysia Open Super Series	Putra Indoor Stadium	Kuala Lumpur	January 18	January 23	400,000	Report
2	(South Korea) Korea Open Super Series Premier	Olympic Gymnastics Arena	Seoul	January 25	January 30	1,200,000	Report
3	All England Super Series Premier	Arena Birmingham	Birmingham	March 8	March 13	350,000	Report
4	India Open Super Series	Siri Fort Indoor Stadium	New Delhi	April 26	May 1	200,000	Report
5	Singapore Super Series	Singapore Indoor Stadium	Singapore	June 14	June 19	200,000	Report
6	Indonesia Super Series Premier	Istora Senayan	Jakarta	June 21	June 26	600,000	Report
7	China Masters Super Series	Xincheng Gymnasium	Changzhou	September 13	September 18	200,000	Report
8	Japan Super Series	Tokyo Metropolitan Gymnasium	Tokyo	September 20	September 25	200,000	Report
9	Denmark Super Series Premier	Odense Sports Park	Odense	October 18	October 23	350,000	Report
10	(France) French Super Series	Stade Pierre de Coubertin	Paris	October 25	October 30	200,000	Report
11	Hong Kong Super Series	Hong Kong Coliseum	Hong Kong	November 15	November 20	250,000	Report
12	China Open Super Series Premier	Yuanshen Sports Centre Stadium	Pudong, Shanghai	November 22	November 27	350,000	Report
13	(China) Super Series Masters Finals	Li-Ning Gymnasium	Liuzhou	December 14	December 18	500,000	Report

Super Series Premier

== Results ==
=== Winners ===
Tour	Men's singles	Women's singles	Men's doubles	Women's doubles	Mixed doubles
Malaysia	(Malaysia) Lee Chong Wei	(China) Wang Shixian	(China) Chai Biao (China) Guo Zhendong	(China) Tian Qing (China) Zhao Yunlei	(China) He Hanbin (China) Ma Jin
(South Korea) Korea	(China) Lin Dan	(China) Wang Yihan	(South Korea) Jung Jae-sung (South Korea) Lee Yong-dae	(China) Wang Xiaoli (China) Yu Yang	(China) Zhang Nan (China) Zhao Yunlei
All England	(Malaysia) Lee Chong Wei	(China) Wang Shixian	(Denmark) Mathias Boe (Denmark) Carsten Mogensen	(China) Wang Xiaoli (China) Yu Yang	(China) Xu Chen (China) Ma Jin
India	(Malaysia) Lee Chong Wei	(Thailand) Porntip Buranaprasertsuk	(Japan) Hirokatsu Hashimoto (Japan) Noriyasu Hirata	(Japan) Miyuki Maeda (Japan) Satoko Suetsuna	(Indonesia) Tontowi Ahmad (Indonesia) Liliyana Natsir
Singapore	(China) Chen Jin	(China) Wang Xin	(China) Cai Yun (China) Fu Haifeng	(China) Tian Qing (China) Zhao Yunlei	(Indonesia) Tontowi Ahmad (Indonesia) Liliyana Natsir
Indonesia	(Malaysia) Lee Chong Wei	(China) Wang Yihan	(China) Cai Yun (China) Fu Haifeng	(China) Wang Xiaoli (China) Yu Yang	(China) Zhang Nan (China) Zhao Yunlei
China Masters	(China) Chen Long	(China) Wang Shixian	(South Korea) Jung Jae-sung (South Korea) Lee Yong-dae	(China) Xia Huan (China) Tang Jinhua	(China) Xu Chen (China) Ma Jin
Japan	(China) Chen Long	(China) Wang Yihan	(China) Cai Yun (China) Fu Haifeng	(China) Bao Yixin (China) Zhong Qianxin	(Chinese Taipei) Chen Hung-ling (Chinese Taipei) Cheng Wen-hsing
Denmark	(China) Chen Long	(China) Wang Xin	(South Korea) Jung Jae-sung (South Korea) Lee Yong-dae	(China) Wang Xiaoli (China) Yu Yang	(Denmark) Joachim Fischer Nielsen (Denmark) Christinna Pedersen
France	(Malaysia) Lee Chong Wei	(China) Wang Xin	(South Korea) Jung Jae-sung (South Korea) Lee Yong-dae	(China) Wang Xiaoli (China) Yu Yang	(Denmark) Joachim Fischer Nielsen (Denmark) Christinna Pedersen
Hong Kong	(China) Lin Dan	(China) Wang Xin	(China) Cai Yun (China) Fu Haifeng	(China) Wang Xiaoli (China) Yu Yang	(China) Zhang Nan (China) Zhao Yunlei
China Open	(China) Lin Dan	(China) Wang Yihan	(Denmark) Mathias Boe (Denmark) Carsten Mogensen	(China) Wang Xiaoli (China) Yu Yang	(China) Zhang Nan (China) Zhao Yunlei
(China) Masters Finals	(China) Lin Dan	(China) Wang Yihan	(Denmark) Mathias Boe (Denmark) Carsten Mogensen	(China) Wang Xiaoli (China) Yu Yang	(China) Zhang Nan (China) Zhao Yunlei

=== Performance by countries ===
Tabulated below are the Super Series performances based on countries. Only countries who have won a title are listed:

Team	MAS	KOR	ENG	IND	SIN	INA	CHN	JPN	DEN	FRA	HKG	CHN	SSF	Total
China	4	4	3		4	4	4	4	3	2	5	4	4	45
Denmark			1						1	1		1	1	5
Malaysia	1		1	1		1				1				5
Korea		1					1		1	1				4
Japan				2										2
Indonesia				1	1									2
Thailand				1										1
Chinese Taipei								1						1

== Finals ==
=== Malaysia ===
Category	Winners	Runners-up	Score
Men's singles	(Malaysia) Lee Chong Wei	(Indonesia) Taufik Hidayat	21–8, 21–17
Women's singles	(China) Wang Shixian	(China) Wang Yihan	21–18, 21–14
Men's doubles	(China) Chai Biao / Guo Zhendong	(Denmark) Mads Conrad-Petersen / Jonas Rasmussen	21–16, 21–14
Women's doubles	(China) Tian Qing / Zhao Yunlei	(China) Wang Xiaoli / Yu Yang	21–12, 6–21, 21–17
Mixed doubles	(China) He Hanbin / Ma Jin	(China) Tao Jiaming / Tian Qing	21–13, 13–21, 21–16

=== Korea ===
Category	Winners	Runners-up	Score
Men's singles	(China) Lin Dan	(Malaysia) Lee Chong Wei	21–19, 14–21, 21–16
Women's singles	(China) Wang Yihan	(China) Wang Shixian	21–14, 21–18
Men's doubles	(South Korea) Jung Jae-sung / Lee Yong-dae	(Denmark) Mathias Boe / Carsten Mogensen	21–6, 21–13
Women's doubles	(China) Wang Xiaoli / Yu Yang	(China) Tian Qing / Zhao Yunlei	21–18, 19–21, 21–4
Mixed doubles	(China) Zhang Nan / Zhao Yunlei	(China) Tao Jiaming / Tian Qing	21–17, 13–21, 21–19

=== All England ===
Category	Winners	Runners-up	Score
Men's singles	(Malaysia) Lee Chong Wei	(China) Lin Dan	21–17, 21–17
Women's singles	(China) Wang Shixian	(Japan) Eriko Hirose	24–22, 21–18
Men's doubles	(Denmark) Mathias Boe / Carsten Mogensen	(Malaysia) Koo Kien Keat / Tan Boon Heong	15–21, 21–18, 21–18
Women's doubles	(China) Wang Xiaoli / Yu Yang	(Japan) Mizuki Fujii / Reika Kakiiwa	21–2, 21–9
Mixed doubles	(China) Xu Chen / Ma Jin	(Thailand) Sudket Prapakamol / Saralee Thungthongkam	21–13, 21–9

=== India ===
Category	Winners	Runners-up	Score
Men's singles	(Malaysia) Lee Chong Wei	(Denmark) Peter Gade	21–12, 12–21, 21–15
Women's singles	(Thailand) Porntip Buranaprasertsuk	(South Korea) Bae Youn-joo	21–13, 21–16
Men's doubles	(Japan) Hirokatsu Hashimoto / Noriyasu Hirata	(Indonesia) Angga Pratama / Rian Agung Saputro	21–17, 21–9
Women's doubles	(Japan) Miyuki Maeda / Satoko Suetsuna	(Japan) Mizuki Fujii / Reika Kakiiwa	26–24, 21–15
Mixed doubles	(Indonesia) Tontowi Ahmad / Liliyana Natsir	(Indonesia) Fran Kurniawan / Pia Zebadiah Bernadet	21–18, 23–21

=== Singapore ===
Category	Winners	Runners-up	Score
Men's singles	(China) Chen Jin	(China) Lin Dan	Walkover
Women's singles	(China) Wang Xin	(Denmark) Tine Baun	21–19, 21–17
Men's doubles	(China) Cai Yun / Fu Haifeng	(Indonesia) Alvent Yulianto / Hendra Aprida Gunawan	21–17, 21–13
Women's doubles	(China) Tian Qing / Zhao Yunlei	(South Korea) Ha Jung-eun / Kim Min-jung	21–13, 21–16
Mixed doubles	(Indonesia) Tontowi Ahmad / Liliyana Natsir	(Chinese Taipei) Chen Hung-ling / Cheng Wen-hsing	21–14, 27–25

=== Indonesia ===
Category	Winners	Runners-up	Score
Men's singles	(Malaysia) Lee Chong Wei	(Denmark) Peter Gade	21–11, 21–7
Women's singles	(China) Wang Yihan	(India) Saina Nehwal	12–21, 23–21, 21–14
Men's doubles	(China) Cai Yun / Fu Haifeng	(China) Chai Biao / Guo Zhendong	21–13, 21–12
Women's doubles	(China) Wang Xiaoli / Yu Yang	(Indonesia) Vita Marissa / Nadya Melati	21–12, 21–10
Mixed doubles	(China) Zhang Nan / Zhao Yunlei	(Indonesia) Tontowi Ahmad / Liliyana Natsir	20–22, 21–14, 21–9

=== China Masters ===
Category	Winners	Runners-up	Score
Men's singles	(China) Chen Long	(China) Chen Jin	21–16, 22–20
Women's singles	(China) Wang Shixian	(China) Jiang Yanjiao	21–16, 8–5 Retired
Men's doubles	(South Korea) Jung Jae-sung / Lee Yong-dae	(China) Cai Yun / Fu Haifeng	21–17, 21–10
Women's doubles	(China) Xia Huan / Tang Jinhua	(China) Wang Xiaoli / Yu Yang	21–19 Retired
Mixed doubles	(China) Xu Chen / Ma Jin	(South Korea) Yoo Yeon-seong / Chang Ye-na	21–13, 21–16

=== Japan ===
Category	Winners	Runners-up	Score
Men's singles	(China) Chen Long	(Malaysia) Lee Chong Wei	21–8, 10–21, 21–19
Women's singles	(China) Wang Yihan	(Germany) Juliane Schenk	21–16, 21–14
Men's doubles	(China) Cai Yun / Fu Haifeng	(Indonesia) Mohammad Ahsan / Bona Septano	21–13, 23–21
Women's doubles	(China) Bao Yixin / Zhong Qianxin	(Chinese Taipei) Chien Yu-chin / Cheng Wen-hsing	13–21, 25–23, 21–12
Mixed doubles	(Chinese Taipei) Chen Hung-ling / Cheng Wen-hsing	(Denmark) Joachim Fischer Nielsen / Christinna Pedersen	21–19, 16–21, 21–15

=== Denmark ===
Category	Winners	Runners-up	Score
Men's singles	(China) Chen Long	(Malaysia) Lee Chong Wei	21–15, 21–18
Women's singles	(China) Wang Xin	(China) Wang Yihan	21–14, 23–21
Men's doubles	(South Korea) Jung Jae-sung / Lee Yong-dae	(China) Cai Yun / Fu Haifeng	21–16, 21–17
Women's doubles	(China) Wang Xiaoli / Yu Yang	(China) Tian Qing / Zhao Yunlei	22–20, 21–16
Mixed doubles	(Denmark) Joachim Fischer Nielsen / Christinna Pedersen	(China) Xu Chen / Ma Jin	22–20, 21–16

=== France ===
Category	Winners	Runners-up	Score
Men's singles	(Malaysia) Lee Chong Wei	(Japan) Kenichi Tago	21–16, 21–11
Women's singles	(China) Wang Xin	(China) Li Xuerui	21–15, 21–19
Men's doubles	(South Korea) Jung Jae-sung / Lee Yong-dae	(China) Cai Yun / Fu Haifeng	14–21, 21–15, 21–11
Women's doubles	(China) Wang Xiaoli / Yu Yang	(China) Tian Qing / Zhao Yunlei	26–24, 21–15
Mixed doubles	(Denmark) Joachim Fischer Nielsen / Christinna Pedersen	(China) Xu Chen / Ma Jin	21–17, 21–14

=== Hong Kong ===
Category	Winners	Runners-up	Score
Men's singles	(China) Lin Dan	(China) Chen Jin	21–12, 21–19
Women's singles	(China) Wang Xin	(Denmark) Tine Baun	21–17, 21–14
Men's doubles	(China) Cai Yun / Fu Haifeng	(South Korea) Jung Jae-sung / Lee Yong-dae	14–21, 24–22, 21–19
Women's doubles	(China) Wang Xiaoli / Yu Yang	(China) Tian Qing / Zhao Yunlei	21–12, 14–2 Retired
Mixed doubles	(China) Zhang Nan / Zhao Yunlei	(Denmark) Joachim Fischer Nielsen / Christinna Pedersen	15–21, 21–17, 21–17

=== China Open ===
Category	Winners	Runners-up	Score
Men's singles	(China) Lin Dan	(China) Chen Long	21–17, 26–24
Women's singles	(China) Wang Yihan	(China) Wang Xin	18–12 Retired
Men's doubles	(Denmark) Mathias Boe / Carsten Mogensen	(South Korea) Ko Sung-hyun / Yoo Yeon-seong	21–17, 21–13
Women's doubles	(China) Wang Xiaoli / Yu Yang	(China) Tang Jinhua / Xia Huan	21–11, 21–10
Mixed doubles	(China) Zhang Nan / Zhao Yunlei	(Denmark) Joachim Fischer Nielsen / Christinna Pedersen	21–11, 21–14

=== Masters Finals ===
Category	Winners	Runners-up	Score
Men's singles	(China) Lin Dan	(China) Chen Long	21–12, 21–16
Women's singles	(China) Wang Yihan	(India) Saina Nehwal	18–21, 21–13, 21–13
Men's doubles	(Denmark) Mathias Boe / Carsten Mogensen	(China) Chai Biao / Guo Zhendong	25–23, 21–7
Women's doubles	(China) Wang Xiaoli / Yu Yang	(South Korea) Ha Jung-eun / Kim Min-jung	21–8, 21–12
Mixed doubles	(China) Zhang Nan / Zhao Yunlei	(China) Xu Chen / Ma Jin	21–13, 21–15
