= 2004 IBF World Junior Championships – girls' singles =

2004 IBF World Junior Championships girls' Singles
Tournament details
- Dates: 25 October 2004 – 30 October 2004
- Edition: 7th
- Level: International
- Venue: Minoru Arena
- Location: Richmond, Canada

The girls' singles event for the 2004 IBF World Junior Championships was held between 25 October and 30 October. Cheng Shao-chieh of Taiwan won the title, breaking Chinese spell from the last editions and becoming the second non-Chinese player to win girls' singles event.

== Seeds ==
1. (China) Jiang Yanjiao (quarter-final)
2. (China) Lu Lan (final)
3. (China) Wang Lin (semi-final)
4. (China) Wang Yihan (quarter-final)
5. (Chinese Taipei) Cheng Shao-chieh (champion)
6. (South Korea) Ha Jung-eun (semi-final)
7. (South Korea) Jang Soo-young (quarter-final)
8. (South Korea) Kim Mi-young (quarter-final)

== Draw ==
=== Finals ===
Quarterfinals
1	(China) Jiang Yanjiao	11	9	5
5/8	(Chinese Taipei) Cheng Shao-chieh	3	11	11
3/4	(China) Wang Yihan	9	6
5/8	(South Korea) Ha Jung-eun	11	11
5/8	(South Korea) Kim Mi-young	11	11
3/4	(China) Wang Lin	13	13
5/8	(South Korea) Jang Soo-young	11	6	9
2	(China) Lu Lan	6	11	11

Semifinals
5/8	(Chinese Taipei) Cheng Shao-chieh	11	11
5/8	(South Korea) Ha Jung-eun	4	2
3/4	(China) Wang Lin	WO
2	(China) Lu Lan

Final
5/8	(Chinese Taipei) Cheng Shao-chieh	11	11
2	(China) Lu Lan	7	5

=== Top half ===
==== Section 1 ====
First round

Second round
1	(China) Jiang YJ	11	11
(Sweden) E Wengberg	4	1
(Nigeria) M Samuel	0	2
(United States) L Todt	11	11
(Indonesia) Y Kartika	6	6
(Japan) Y Oku	11	11
(Malaysia) A Anscelly	11	11
(Peru) C Aicardi	4	3

Third round
1	(China) Jiang YJ	11	11
(United States) L Todt	0	0
(Japan) Y Oku	9	6
(Malaysia) A Anscelly	11	11

Fourth round
1	(China) Jiang YJ	11	11
(Malaysia) A Anscelly	1	0

==== Section 2 ====
First round
(Switzerland) J Cicognini	11	11
(Russia) O Kozlova	7	7

Second round
5/8	(Chinese Taipei) Cheng S-c	11	11
(Slovenia) Š Silvester	4	4
(Czech Republic) P Janošová	7	3
(Germany) J Goliszewski	11	11
(Russia) A Kudinova	11	11
(Slovenia) A Kovač	2	4
(South Korea) Lee H-j	11	7	1
(Switzerland) J Cicognini	6	11	11

Third round
5/8	(Chinese Taipei) Cheng S-c	11	11
(Germany) J Goliszewski	9	0
(Russia) A Kudinova	12	13	11
(Switzerland) J Cicognini	13	12	8

Fourth round
5/8	(Chinese Taipei) Cheng S-c	11	11
(Russia) A Kudinova	4	1

==== Section 3 ====
First round
(Croatia) M Savor	11	5
(India) A Balan	13	11

Second round
3/4	(China) Wang YH
(Bulgaria) L Zetchiri	WO
(Singapore) Tan WQ	11	11
(Sweden) S Jonsson	7	8
(Netherlands) P Stolzenbach	9	2
(Japan) M Sekiya	11	11
(Germany) J Köhler	4	11	1
(India) A Balan	11	5	11

Third round
3/4	(China) Wang YH	11	11
(Singapore) Tan WQ	3	1
(Japan) M Sekiya	11	11
(India) A Balan	4	7

Fourth round
3/4	(China) Wang YH	11	11
(Japan) M Sekiya	4	2

==== Section 4 ====
First round
(Denmark) D Matthiesen	2	3
(Indonesia) F Ratnasari	11	11

Second round
5/8	(South Korea) Ha J-e	9	11	11
(Chinese Taipei) Cheng H-h	11	4	6
(Nigeria) O Efosa	WO
(Hong Kong) Mong KY
(Hong Kong) Yip PY	11	11
(England) M Cheung	1	2
(Canada) J Ko	2	4
(Indonesia) F Ratnasari	11	11

Third round
5/8	(South Korea) Ha J-e	11	11
(Hong Kong) Mong KY	1	1
(Hong Kong) Yip PY	11	11
(Indonesia) F Ratnasari	3	3

Fourth round
5/8	(South Korea) Ha J-e	11	11
(Hong Kong) Yip PY	6	1

=== Bottom half ===
==== Section 5 ====
First round
(Germany) M Reich	8	11	11
(Canada) S Ralph	11	9	1

Second round
(Germany) M Reich
(Russia) E Chernjavskaya	WO
(Peru) C Rivero	13	11
(India) V Dave	12	3
(Slovenia) U Silvester	11	11
(Canada) A Man	3	8
(United States) T Kimura	0	0
5/8	(South Korea) Kim M-y	11	11

Third round
(Germany) M Reich	7	12
(Peru) C Rivero	11	13
(Slovenia) U Silvester	1	5
5/8	(South Korea) Kim M-y	11	11

Fourth round
(Peru) C Rivero	0	1
5/8	(South Korea) Kim M-y	11	11

==== Section 6 ====
First round
(Sweden) E Lennartsson	10	3
(Chinese Taipei) Chang Y-l	13	11

Second round
(Chinese Taipei) Chang Y-l	11	13
(Russia) N Vislova	7	11
(Malaysia) A Raj Kaur	11	11
(Czech Republic) K Ludíková	6	0
(Germany) A Lillie	11	11
(Nigeria) M Gideon	4	2
(England) H Olver	5	1
3/4	(China) Wang L	11	11

Third round
(Chinese Taipei) Chang Y-l	11	11
(Malaysia) A Raj Kaur	2	6
(Germany) A Lillie	8	1
3/4	(China) Wang L	11	11

Fourth round
(Chinese Taipei) Chang Y-l	3	3
3/4	(China) Wang L	11	11

==== Section 7 ====
First round
(India) S Gokhale	11	11
(Hong Kong) Lam SY	6	0

Second round
(India) S Gokhale	11	2	3
(England) E Cox	7	11	11
(Japan) K Mizuma	6	4
(Indonesia) N Maheswari	11	11
(Canada) C Chau	11	11
(Singapore) C Goh	6	2
(Denmark) M Nielsen	1	4
5/8	(South Korea) Jang S-y	11	11

Third round
(England) E Cox	11	7	8
(Indonesia) N Maheswari	7	11	11
(Canada) C Chau	0	3
5/8	(South Korea) Jang S-y	11	11

Fourth round
(Indonesia) N Maheswari	6	3
5/8	(South Korea) Jang S-y	11	11

==== Section 8 ====
First round
(India) S Nehwal	11	11
(Netherlands) E Besselink	0	3

Second round
(India) S Nehwal	7	9
(Chinese Taipei) Pai M-j	11	11
(Hong Kong) Chan TK	11	11
(Japan) Y Kimura	9	1
(Indonesia) W Meilyanna	11	11
(Peru) A Monteverde	2	0
(Estonia) S Kamilova	0	1
2	(China) Lu L	11	11

Third round
(Chinese Taipei) Pai M-j	11	11
(Hong Kong) Chan TK	2	1
(Indonesia) W Meilyanna	2	8
2	(China) Lu L	11	11

Fourth round
(Chinese Taipei) Pai M-j	10	1
2	(China) Lu L	13	11
