= 2011 BWF World Championships – Women's singles =

Badminton championships

Women's singles at the 2011 BWF World Championships
- Venue: Wembley Arena
- Location: London, England
- Dates: August 8, 2011 – August 14, 2011

Medalists
gold medal	Wang Yihan	China
silver medal	Cheng Shao-chieh	Chinese Taipei
bronze medal	Juliane Schenk	Germany
bronze medal	Wang Xin	China

The women's singles tournament of the 2011 BWF World Championships (World Badminton Championships) was held from August 8 to 14. Wang Lin was the defending champion.
Wang Yihan won the final against Cheng Shao-Chieh 21–15, 21–10.

== Seeds ==
1. (China) Wang Shixian (quarterfinals)
2. (China) Wang Yihan (champion)
3. (China) Wang Xin (semifinals)
4. (China) Jiang Yanjiao (third round)
5. (Denmark) Tine Baun (quarterfinals)
6. (India) Saina Nehwal (quarterfinals)
7. (Chinese Taipei) Cheng Shao-Chieh (final)
8. (South Korea) Bae Youn-joo (second round)
9. (Germany) Juliane Schenk (semifinals)
10. (Thailand) Porntip Buranaprasertsuk (third round)
11. (Thailand) Ratchanok Intanon (third round)
12. (Bulgaria) Petya Nedelcheva (third round)
13. (South Korea) Sung Ji-hyun (third round)
14. (Hong Kong) Yip Pui Yin (third round, retired)
15. (Japan) Eriko Hirose (second round)
16. (Japan) Sayaka Sato (third round)

== Draw ==
=== Finals ===
Quarterfinals
1	(China) Wang Shixian	16	17
7	(Chinese Taipei) Cheng Shao-chieh	21	21
9	(Germany) Juliane Schenk	21	21
5	(Denmark) Tine Baun	9	11
6	(India) Saina Nehwal	15	10
3	(China) Wang Xin	21	21
(France) Pi Hongyan	14	16
2	(China) Wang Yihan	21	21

Semifinals
7	(Chinese Taipei) Cheng Shao-chieh	21	21
9	(Germany) Juliane Schenk	18	6
3	(China) Wang Xin	14	15
2	(China) Wang Yihan	21	21

Final
7	(Chinese Taipei) Cheng Shao-chieh	15	10
2	(China) Wang Yihan	21	21

=== Section 1 ===
First Round
(Bulgaria) L Zetchiri	21	21
(Morocco) R Rochdy	7	12
(New Zealand) M Chan	21	13	11
(England) E Cann	16	21	21
(Canada) C Reid	9	19
(Belgium) L Tan	21	21
(Netherlands) Yao J	18	21
(Spain) C Marín	21	23

Second Round
1	(China) Wang SX	21	21
(Bulgaria) L Zetchiri	11	14
10	(Thailand) P Buranaprasertsuk	21	21
(England) E Cann	12	19
7	(Chinese Taipei) Cheng S-c	21	21
(Belgium) L Tan	15	11
15	(Japan) E Hirose	23	16	16
(Spain) C Marín	21	21	21

Third Round
1	(China) Wang SX	21	21
10	(Thailand) P Buranaprasertsuk	7	11
7	(Chinese Taipei) Cheng S-c	21	21
(Spain) C Marín	18	17

Quarterfinals
1	(China) Wang SX	16	17
7	(Chinese Taipei) Cheng S-c	21	21

=== Section 2 ===
First Round
(Singapore) Fu MT	21	21
(Ukraine) L Griga	10	10
(Indonesia) L Fanetri	21	21
(Russia) T Bibik	11	9
(Switzerland) J Cicognini	22	19	13
(Hong Kong) Chan TK	20	21	21
(Slovenia) M Tvrdy	11	13
(Japan) A Goto	21	21

Second Round
4	(China) Jiang YJ	21	21
(Singapore) Fu MT	13	17
9	(Germany) J Schenk	22	18	21
(Indonesia) L Fanetri	20	21	11
5	(Denmark) T Baun	26	21
(Hong Kong) Chan TK	24	7
13	(South Korea) Sung J-h	21	21
(Japan) A Goto	13	14

Third Round
4	(China) Jiang YJ	14	21	17
9	(Germany) J Schenk	21	7	21
5	(Denmark) T Baun	13	21	21
13	(South Korea) Sung J-h	21	12	10

Quarterfinals
9	(Germany) J Schenk	21	21
5	(Denmark) T Baun	9	11

=== Section 3 ===
First Round
(Scotland) S Egelstaff	20	16
(Canada) M Li	22	21
(Indonesia) A Firdasari	21	22	13
(Republic of Ireland) C Magee	13	24	21
(United States) R Wang	17	17
(Italy) A Allegrini	21	21
(Czech Republic) K Gavnholt	16	15
(Russia) A Prokopenko	21	21

Second Round
(Canada) M Li	21	21	17
14	(Hong Kong) Yip PY	23	17	21
(Republic of Ireland) C Magee	10	7
6	(India) S Nehwal	21	21
(Italy) A Allegrini	11	12
12	(Bulgaria) P Nedelcheva	21	21
(Russia) A Prokopenko	15	13
3	(China) Wang X	21	21

Third Round
14	(Hong Kong) Yip PY	3	5	r
6	(India) S Nehwal	21	13
12	(Bulgaria) P Nedelcheva	21	13	5
3	(China) Wang X	16	21	21

Quarterfinals
6	(India) S Nehwal	15	10
3	(China) Wang X	21	21

=== Section 4 ===
First Round
(Chinese Taipei) Tai T-y	wo
(Germany) O Konon
(France) Pi HY	21	21
(England) S Walker	12	8
(Austria) S Prutsch	10	18
(Netherlands) J Meulendijks	21	21
(Singapore) Gu J	21	21
(Thailand) S Ponsana	19	17

Second Round
(Germany) O Konon	20	11
16	(Japan) S Sato	22	21
(France) Pi HY	21	15	21
8	(South Korea) Bae Y-j	9	21	13
(Netherlands) J Meulendijks	18	21	14
11	(Thailand) R Intanon	21	11	21
(Singapore) Gu J	13	18
2	(China) Wang YH	21	21

Third Round
16	(Japan) S Sato	18	14
(France) Pi HY	21	21
11	(Thailand) R Intanon	21	12	9
2	(China) Wang YH	13	21	21

Quarterfinals
(France) Pi HY	14	16
2	(China) Wang YH	21	21
