= 2016 Badminton Asia Championships =

Badminton championships

Badminton Asia Championships
- 2016

Tournament information
- Location: Wuhan, China
- Dates: April 26–May 1
- Venue: Wuhan Sports Center Gymnasium

The 2016 Badminton Asia Championships was the 35th edition of the Badminton Asia Championships. It was held in Wuhan, China, from April 26 to May 1.

== Venue ==
- This tournament was held at Wuhan Sports Center Gymnasium.

== Medalists ==
Event	Gold	Silver	Bronze
Men's singles	Lee Chong Wei (MAS)	Chen Long (CHN)	Tian Houwei (CHN)
Men's singles	Lee Chong Wei (MAS)	Chen Long (CHN)	Lin Dan (CHN)
Women's singles	Wang Yihan (CHN)	Li Xuerui (CHN)	Sung Ji-hyun (KOR)
Women's singles	Wang Yihan (CHN)	Li Xuerui (CHN)	Saina Nehwal (IND)
Men's doubles	Lee Yong-dae (KOR); Yoo Yeon-seong (KOR)	Li Junhui (CHN); Liu Yuchen (CHN)	Takeshi Kamura (JPN); Keigo Sonoda (JPN)
Men's doubles	Lee Yong-dae (KOR); Yoo Yeon-seong (KOR)	Li Junhui (CHN); Liu Yuchen (CHN)	Fu Haifeng (CHN); Zhang Nan (CHN)
Women's doubles	Misaki Matsutomo (JPN); Ayaka Takahashi (JPN)	Naoko Fukuman (JPN); Kurumi Yonao (JPN)	Chang Ye-na (KOR); Lee So-hee (KOR)
Women's doubles	Misaki Matsutomo (JPN); Ayaka Takahashi (JPN)	Naoko Fukuman (JPN); Kurumi Yonao (JPN)	Nitya Krishinda Maheswari (INA); Greysia Polii (INA)
Mixed doubles	Zhang Nan (CHN); Zhao Yunlei (CHN)	Tontowi Ahmad (INA); Liliyana Natsir (INA)	Ko Sung-hyun (KOR); Kim Ha-na (KOR)
Mixed doubles	Zhang Nan (CHN); Zhao Yunlei (CHN)	Tontowi Ahmad (INA); Liliyana Natsir (INA)	Shin Baek-cheol (KOR); Chae Yoo-jung (KOR)

== Medal table ==
Rank	Nation	Gold	Silver	Bronze	Total
1	China (CHN)	2	3	3	8
2	Japan (JPN)	1	1	1	3
3	South Korea (KOR)	1	0	4	5
4	Malaysia (MAS)	1	0	0	1
5	Indonesia (INA)	0	1	1	2
6	India (IND)	0	0	1	1
Totals (6 entries)		5	5	10	20

== Men's singles ==
=== Seeds ===
1. (China) Chen Long (final)
2. (China) Lin Dan (semifinals)
3. (Malaysia) Lee Chong Wei (champion)
4. (Japan) Kento Momota (withdrew)
5. (China) Tian Houwei (semifinals)
6. (Chinese Taipei) Chou Tien-chen (quarterfinals)
7. (Indonesia) Tommy Sugiarto (quarterfinals)
8. (India) Srikanth Kidambi (first round)

=== Top half ===
First Round
1	(China) Chen L	21	21
(South Korea) Jeon H-j	4	16
(Hong Kong) Wei N	12	21	18
(Malaysia) Z Zulkiffli	21	17	21
7	(Indonesia) T Sugiarto	21	21
D1	(Kazakhstan) A Niyazov	6	7
(Chinese Taipei) Hsu J-h	19	13
(Thailand) B Ponsana	21	21
PFQ	(Chinese Taipei) Wang T-w	21	21
(Malaysia) I Z Zainuddin	19	18
PFQ	(Singapore) D Wong	22	21	18
(Indonesia) J Christie	24	16	21
5	(China) Tian HW	21	21
(South Korea) Son W-h	14	17
B1	(Jordan) B A Alshannik	6	6
(Hong Kong) Ng K L	21	21

Second Round
1	(China) Chen L	21	21
(Malaysia) Z Zulkiffli	12	10
7	(Indonesia) T Sugiarto	21	21
(Thailand) B Ponsana	17	9
PFQ	(Chinese Taipei) Wang T-w	21	15	21
(Indonesia) J Christie	9	21	18
5	(China) Tian HW	21	21
(Hong Kong) Ng K L	18	14

Quarterfinals
1	(China) Chen L	21	21
7	(Indonesia) T Sugiarto	16	14
PFQ	(Chinese Taipei) Wang T-w	15	21	16
5	(China) Tian HW	21	19	21

Semifinals
1	(China) Chen L	21	21
5	(China) Tian HW	14	16

=== Bottom half ===
First Round
(Japan) T Ueda	23	21
(Thailand) T Saensomboonsuk	21	18
A1	(Thailand) K Phetpradab	14	15
6	(Chinese Taipei) Chou T-c	21	21
(Indonesia) A Ginting	18	6
(Hong Kong) Wong W K	21	21
(China) Wang ZM	16	14
3	(Malaysia) Lee C W	21	21
(Hong Kong) Hu Y	21	21
(Japan) S Sasaki	17	17
(South Korea) Lee D-k	13	21	21
8	(India) S Kidambi	21	12	19
C1	(Singapore) Loh K Y	17	14
(Vietnam) Nguyen T M	21	21
(Indonesia) I M Mustofa	9	21	19
2	(China) Lin D	21	14	21

Second Round
(Japan) T Ueda	18	13
6	(Chinese Taipei) Chou T-c	21	21
(Hong Kong) Wong W K	21	12
3	(Malaysia) Lee C W	23	21
(Hong Kong) Hu Y	11	21	14
(South Korea) Lee D-k	21	17	21
(Vietnam) Nguyen T M	13	11
2	(China) Lin D	21	21

Quarterfinals
6	(Chinese Taipei) Chou T-c	16	18
3	(Malaysia) Lee C W	21	21
(South Korea) Lee D-k	15	11
2	(China) Lin D	21	21

Semifinals
3	(Malaysia) Lee C W	22	15	21
2	(China) Lin D	20	21	4

=== Finals ===
Semifinals
1	(China) Chen Long	21	21
5	(China) Tian Houwei	14	16
3	(Malaysia) Lee Chong Wei	22	15	21
2	(China) Lin Dan	20	21	4

Final
1	(China) Chen Long	17	21	13
3	(Malaysia) Lee Chong Wei	21	15	21

== Women's singles ==
=== Seeds ===
1. (China) Li Xuerui (final)
2. (Japan) Nozomi Okuhara (quarterfinals)
3. (China) Wang Shixian (quarterfinals)
4. (Thailand) Ratchanok Intanon (second round)
5. (India) Saina Nehwal (semifinals)
6. (China) Wang Yihan (champion)
7. (South Korea) Sung Ji-hyun (semifinals)
8. (Chinese Taipei) Tai Tzu-ying (quarterfinals)

=== Top half ===
First Round
1	(China) Li XR	19	21	21
(Thailand) P Buranaprasertsuk	21	6	15
B1	(Malaysia) Goh J W	16	21
(Japan) A Yamaguchi	21	23
8	(Chinese Taipei) Tai T-y	21	21
(South Korea) Kim H-m	12	8
(Indonesia) M F Kusumastuti	10	13
(India) P.V. Sindhu	21	21
4	(Thailand) R Intanon	21	21
C1	(Malaysia) Ho Y M	7	11
(Japan) S Sato	21	21
(Indonesia) H Ramadhini	12	12
7	(South Korea) Sung J-h	21	21
(China) Sun Y	17	15
(Hong Kong) Yip P Y	21	21
(Chinese Taipei) Hsu Y-c	13	17

Second Round
1	(China) Li XR	21	18	21
(Japan) A Yamaguchi	16	21	19
8	(Chinese Taipei) Tai T-y	13	22	21
(India) P.V. Sindhu	21	20	8
4	(Thailand) R Intanon	21	16	17
(Japan) S Sato	17	21	21
7	(South Korea) Sung J-h	21	21
(Hong Kong) Yip P Y	15	15

Quarterfinals
1	(China) Li XR	21	21
8	(Chinese Taipei) Tai T-y	17	19
(Japan) S Sato	15	21	13
7	(South Korea) Sung J-h	21	16	21

Semifinals
1	(China) Li XR	22	21
7	(South Korea) Sung J-h	20	11

=== Bottom half ===
First Round
(Thailand) N Jindapol	21	21
(Indonesia) L Fanetri	10	18
A1	(Indonesia) Fitriani	16	17
5	(India) S Nehwal	21	21
(Japan) Y Hashimoto	21	17	18
(Chinese Taipei) Pai Y-p	17	21	21
(Hong Kong) Cheung N Y	18	12
3	(China) Wang SX	21	21
(Singapore) Liang XY	25	21
D1	(Vietnam) Nguyen T L	23	15
(Malaysia) Tee J Y	21	12	11
6	(China) Wang YH	13	21	21
(South Korea) Bae Y-j	21	21
(Vietnam) Vu T T	10	14
(Thailand) B Ongbumrungpan	18	21	7
2	(Japan) N Okuhara	21	15	21

Second Round
(Thailand) N Jindapol	14	18
5	(India) S Nehwal	21	21
(Chinese Taipei) Pai Y-p	14	15
3	(China) Wang SX	21	21
(Singapore) Liang XY	13	14
6	(China) Wang YH	21	21
(South Korea) Bae Y-j	5	9
2	(Japan) N Okuhara	21	21

Quarterfinals
5	(India) S Nehwal	21	21
3	(China) Wang SX	16	19
6	(China) Wang YH	8	21	21
2	(Japan) N Okuhara	21	13	19

Semifinals
5	(India) S Nehwal	16	14
6	(China) Wang YH	21	21

=== Finals ===
Semifinals
1	(China) Li Xuerui	22	21
7	(South Korea) Sung Ji-hyun	20	11
5	(India) Saina Nehwal	16	14
6	(China) Wang Yihan	21	21

Final
1	(China) Li Xuerui	14	21	16
6	(China) Wang Yihan	21	13	21

== Men's doubles ==
=== Seeds ===
1. (South Korea) Lee Yong-dae / Yoo Yeon-seong (champion)
2. (Indonesia) Mohammad Ahsan / Hendra Setiawan (second round)
3. (China) Chai Biao / Hong Wei (first round)
4. (China) Fu Haifeng / Zhang Nan (semifinals)
5. (Japan) Hiroyuki Endo / Kenichi Hayakawa (second round)
6. (South Korea) Ko Sung-hyun / Shin Baek-cheol (quarterfinals)
7. (South Korea) Kim Gi-jung / Kim Sa-rang (second round)
8. (Indonesia) Angga Pratama / Ricky Karanda Suwardi (second round)

=== Top half ===
First Round
1	(South Korea) Lee Y-d (South Korea) Yoo Y-s	21	21
(Chinese Taipei) Lee S-m (Chinese Taipei) Tsai C-h	11	15
(India) P J Chopra (India) A Dewalkar	19	17
(Hong Kong) Or C C (Hong Kong) Tang C M	21	21
8	(Indonesia) A Pratama (Indonesia) R K Suwardi	21	21
B1	(Uzbekistan) A Bakhshullaev (Uzbekistan) A Savatyugin	10	7
(China) Liu XL (China) Qiu ZH	22	18	21
(Thailand) D Puavaranukroh (Thailand) K Kedren	20	21	16
3	(China) Chai B (China) Hong W	25	17
(Japan) T Kamura (Japan) K Sonoda	27	21
(Chinese Taipei) Liao M-c (Chinese Taipei) Tseng M-h	21	15	13
(Malaysia) Koo K K (Malaysia) Tan B H	14	21	21
7	(South Korea) Kim G-j (South Korea) Kim S-r	21	21
A1	(Vietnam) Bao M (Vietnam) Duong B D	7	11
(Thailand) W Ampunsuwan (Thailand) T Isriyanate	21	14	13
(Indonesia) M F Gideon (Indonesia) K S Sukamuljo	15	21	21

Second Round
1	(South Korea) Lee Y-d (South Korea) Yoo Y-s	21	21
(Hong Kong) Or C C (Hong Kong) Tang C M	8	9
8	(Indonesia) A Pratama (Indonesia) R K Suwardi	17	15
(China) Liu XL (China) Qiu ZH	21	21
(Japan) T Kamura (Japan) K Sonoda	21	21
(Malaysia) Koo K K (Malaysia) Tan B H	13	18
7	(South Korea) Kim G-j (South Korea) Kim S-r	21	19	16
(Indonesia) M F Gideon (Indonesia) K S Sukamuljo	13	21	21

Quarterfinals
1	(South Korea) Lee Y-d (South Korea) Yoo Y-s	21	18	21
(China) Liu XL (China) Qiu ZH	11	21	18
(Japan) T Kamura (Japan) K Sonoda	21	17	21
(Indonesia) M F Gideon (Indonesia) K S Sukamuljo	18	21	16

Semifinals
1	(South Korea) Lee Y-d (South Korea) Yoo Y-s	21	21
(Japan) T Kamura (Japan) K Sonoda	17	18

=== Bottom half ===
First Round
(Chinese Taipei) Lee J-h (Chinese Taipei) Lee Y	23	21	21
(Thailand) B Issara (Thailand) N Puangpuapech	25	16	13
D1	(Singapore) D B Chrisnanta (Singapore) H Wijaya	14	13
6	(South Korea) Ko S-h (South Korea) Shin B-c	21	21
(Singapore) Terry Hee Y K (Singapore) Loh K H	18	23	21
(Malaysia) Goh V S (Malaysia) Tan W K	21	21	19
(Indonesia) B Angriawan (Indonesia) R A Saputro	12	13
4	(China) Fu HF (China) Zhang N	21	21
(Chinese Taipei) Chen H-l (Chinese Taipei) Wang C-l	21	20	21
(South Korea) Choi S-g (South Korea) Kim J-h	17	22	18
(India) M Attri (India) B. S Reddy	15	13
5	(Japan) H Endo (Japan) K Hayakawa	21	21
(China) Li JH (China) Liu YC	21	17	21
(Hong Kong) Chan T K (Hong Kong) Law C H	12	21	16
C1	(Jordan) B A Alshannik (Jordan) M N M Nayef	12	12
2	(Indonesia) M Ahsan (Indonesia) H Setiawan	21	21

Second Round
(Chinese Taipei) Lee J-h (Chinese Taipei) Lee Y	10	11
6	(South Korea) Ko S-h (South Korea) Shin B-c	21	21
(Singapore) Terry Hee Y K (Singapore) Loh K H	16	12
4	(China) Fu HF (China) Zhang N	21	21
(Chinese Taipei) Chen H-l (Chinese Taipei) Wang C-l	21	7	21
5	(Japan) H Endo (Japan) K Hayakawa	14	21	11
(China) Li JH (China) Liu YC	15	21	21
2	(Indonesia) M Ahsan (Indonesia) H Setiawan	21	15	13

Quarterfinals
6	(South Korea) Ko S-h (South Korea) Shin B-c	17	18
4	(China) Fu HF (China) Zhang N	21	21
(Chinese Taipei) Chen H-l (Chinese Taipei) Wang C-l	17	21	12
(China) Li JH (China) Liu YC	21	16	21

Semifinals
4	(China) Fu HF (China) Zhang N	21	19
(China) Li JH (China) Liu YC	23	21

=== Finals ===
Semifinals
1	(South Korea) Lee Yong-dae (South Korea) Yoo Yeon-seong	21	21
(Japan) Takeshi Kamura (Japan) Keigo Sonoda	17	18
4	(China) Fu Haifeng (China) Zhang Nan	21	19
(China) Li Junhui (China) Liu Yuchen	23	21

Final
1	(South Korea) Lee Yong-dae (South Korea) Yoo Yeon-seong	21	28
(China) Li Junhui (China) Liu Yuchen	14	26

== Women's doubles ==
=== Seeds ===
1. (Japan) Misaki Matsutomo / Ayaka Takahashi (champion)
2. (China) Luo Ying / Luo Yu (quarterfinals)
3. (Indonesia) Nitya Krishinda Maheswari / Greysia Polii (semifinals)
4. (China) Tian Qing / Zhao Yunlei (quarterfinals)

=== Top half ===
First Round
(Hong Kong) Ng T Y (Hong Kong) Yeung N T	11	16
(China) Chen QC (China) Jia YF	21	21
(Thailand) P Supajirakul (Thailand) S Taerattanachai	w	/	o
(South Korea) Go A-r (South Korea) Yoo H-w
(Chinese Taipei) Hsu Y-c (Chinese Taipei) Pai Y-p	6	14
(Indonesia) D D Haris (Indonesia) R E Putri Sari	21	21
(Indonesia) A S Awanda (Indonesia) N K Mahadewi Istirani	21	21
(Vietnam) Le T H (Vietnam) Pham N T	6	16
(India) J Gutta (India) A Ponnappa	15	11
(South Korea) Chang Y-n (South Korea) Lee S-h	21	21
(Thailand) C Chaladchalam (Thailand) P Muenwong	16	16
(Japan) Y Fukushima (Japan) S Hirota	21	21

Second Round
1	(Japan) M Matsutomo (Japan) A Takahashi	22	21
(China) Chen QC (China) Jia YF	20	18
(Thailand) P Supajirakul (Thailand) S Taerattanachai	21	21
(Indonesia) D D Haris (Indonesia) R E Putri	18	16
4	(China) Tian Q (China) Zhao YL	21	21
(Indonesia) A S Awanda (Indonesia) N K Mahadewi Istirani	12	15
(South Korea) Chang Y-n (South Korea) Lee S-h	21	21
(Japan) Y Fukushima (Japan) S Hirota	17	13

Quarterfinals
1	(Japan) M Matsutomo (Japan) A Takahashi	21	21
(Thailand) P Supajirakul (Thailand) S Taerattanachai	12	15
4	(China) Tian Q (China) Zhao YL	18	10
(South Korea) Chang Y-n (South Korea) Lee S-h	21	21

Semifinals
1	(Japan) M Matsutomo (Japan) A Takahashi	21	21
(South Korea) Chang Y-n (South Korea) Lee S-h	16	19

=== Bottom half ===
First Round
(South Korea) Jung K-e (South Korea) Shin S-c	21	21
(Chinese Taipei) Chiang K-h (Chinese Taipei) Wu F-c	11	15
(Sri Lanka) A Ratnasiri (Sri Lanka) U S Weerasinghe	8	7
(Japan) S Matsuo (Japan) M Naito	21	21
(Malaysia) Vivian Hoo K M (Malaysia) Woon K W	w	/	o
(China) Tang YT (China) Yu Y
(Thailand) J Kititharakul (Thailand) R Prajongjai	18	8
3	(Indonesia) N K Maheswari (Indonesia) G Polii	21	21
(Japan) N Fukuman (Japan) K Yonao	21	21
(Hong Kong) Chan T K (Hong Kong) Yuen S Y	15	9
(Vietnam) Nguyen T S (Vietnam) Vu T T	17	10
(Thailand) S Amitrapai (Thailand) P Chochuwong	21	21
(Indonesia) M C Bandaso (Indonesia) S Kani	16	10
(Chinese Taipei) Hsieh P-c (Chinese Taipei) Wu T-j	21	21

Second Round
(South Korea) Jung K-e (South Korea) Shin S-c	21	18	24
(Japan) S Matsuo (Japan) M Naito	11	21	22
(Malaysia) Vivian Hoo K M (Malaysia) Woon K W	21	20	11
3	(Indonesia) N K Maheswari (Indonesia) G Polii	18	22	21
(Japan) N Fukuman (Japan) K Yonao	21	21
(Thailand) S Amitrapai (Thailand) P Chochuwong	10	18
(Chinese Taipei) Hsieh P-c (Chinese Taipei) Wu T-j	8	9
2	(China) Luo Y (China) Luo Y	21	21

Quarterfinals
(South Korea) Jung K-e (South Korea) Shin S-c	13	21	18
3	(Indonesia) N K Maheswari (Indonesia) G Polii	21	11	21
(Japan) N Fukuman (Japan) K Yonao	22	18	21
2	(China) Luo Y (China) Luo Y	20	21	14

Semifinals
3	(Indonesia) N K Maheswari (Indonesia) G Polii	21	19	22
(Japan) N Fukuman (Japan) K Yonao	13	21	24

=== Finals ===
Semifinals
1	(Japan) Misaki Matsutomo (Japan) Ayaka Takahashi	21	21
(South Korea) Chang Ye-na (South Korea) Lee So-hee	16	19
3	(Indonesia) Nitya Krishinda Maheswari (Indonesia) Greysia Polii	21	19	22
(Japan) Naoko Fukuman (Japan) Kurumi Yonao	13	21	24

Final
1	(Japan) Misaki Matsutomo (Japan) Ayaka Takahashi	21	21
(Japan) Naoko Fukuman (Japan) Kurumi Yonao	13	15

== Mixed doubles ==
=== Seeds ===
1. (China) Zhang Nan / Zhao Yunlei (champion)
2. (Indonesia) Tontowi Ahmad / Liliyana Natsir (final)
3. (China) Liu Cheng / Bao Yixin (second round)
4. (South Korea) Ko Sung-hyun / Kim Ha-na (semifinals)

=== Top half ===
First Round
(Japan) K Kazuno (Japan) A Kurihara	14	15
(Malaysia) Tan K M (Malaysia) Lai P J	21	21
(Hong Kong) Chan Y L (Hong Kong) Tse Y S	9	14
(Indonesia) P Jordan (Indonesia) D Susanto	21	21
(Singapore) D B Chrisnanta (Singapore) Vanessa Neo Y Y	17	10
(South Korea) Kim G-j (South Korea) Shin S-c	21	21
4	(South Korea) Ko S-h (South Korea) Kim H-n	21	21
(Chinese Taipei) Chang K-c (Chinese Taipei) Chang H-t	9	16
(Indonesia) E Subaktiar (Indonesia) G E Widjaja	21	21
(Jordan) M N M Nayef (Jordan) M Leina Fehmi	14	9
(India) A Vishnu (India) A Balan	13	13
(Thailand) D Puavaranukroh (Thailand) S Taerattanachai	21	21
(Hong Kong) Tang C M (Hong Kong) Ng T Y	17	10
(China) Lu K (China) Huang YQ	21	21

Second Round
1	(China) Zhang N (China) Zhao YL	21	21
(Malaysia) Tan K M (Malaysia) Lai P J	10	12
(Indonesia) P Jordan (Indonesia) D Susanto	17	20
(South Korea) Kim G-j (South Korea) Shin S-c	21	22
4	(South Korea) Ko S-h (South Korea) Kim H-n	21	22	21
(Indonesia) E Subaktiar (Indonesia) G E Widjaja	13	24	15
(Thailand) D Puavaranukroh (Thailand) S Taerattanachai	13	16
(China) Lu K (China) Huang YQ	21	21

Quarterfinals
1	(China) Zhang N (China) Zhao YL	21	21
(South Korea) Kim G-j (South Korea) Shin S-c	14	10
4	(South Korea) Ko S-h (South Korea) Kim H-n	21	21
(China) Lu K (China) Huang YQ	18	16

Semifinals
1	(China) Zhang N (China) Zhao YL	21	21
4	(South Korea) Ko S-h (South Korea) Kim H-n	19	11

=== Bottom half ===
First Round
(South Korea) Shin B-c (South Korea) Chae Y-j	21	18	21
(Malaysia) Chan P S (Malaysia) Goh L Y	18	21	16
(Indonesia) R Alexander (Indonesia) M D Oktavianti	21	22
(Hong Kong) Law C H (Hong Kong) Yuen S Y	18	20
(Japan) K Sonoda (Japan) N Fukuman	18	22
(Thailand) B Issara (Thailand) S Amitrapai	21	24
(Vietnam) Do T D (Vietnam) Pham N T	8	16
3	(China) Liu C (China) Bao YX	21	21
(Singapore) Terry Hee Y K (Singapore) Tan W T	13	11
(Hong Kong) Lee C H (Hong Kong) Chau H W	21	21
(Chinese Taipei) Liao M-c (Chinese Taipei) Chen H-h	15	18
(South Korea) Choi S-g (South Korea) Eom H-w	21	21
(Kazakhstan) A Niyazov (Kazakhstan) V Sorokina	3	10
(China) Xu C (China) Ma J	21	21

Second Round
(South Korea) Shin B-c (South Korea) Chae Y-j	21	16	21
(Indonesia) R Alexander (Indonesia) M D Oktaviani	18	21	14
(Thailand) B Issara (Thailand) S Amitrapai	9
3	(China) Liu C (China) Bao YX	9^{r}
(Hong Kong) Lee C H (Hong Kong) Chau H W	22	17
(South Korea) Choi S-g (South Korea) Eom H-w	24	21
(China) Xu C (China) Ma J	12	16
2	(Indonesia) T Ahmad (Indonesia) L Natsir	21	21

Quarterfinals
(South Korea) Shin B-c (South Korea) Chae Y-j	21	21
(Thailand) B Issara (Thailand) S Amitrapai	14	18
(South Korea) Choi S-g (South Korea) Eom H-w	16	15
2	(Indonesia) T Ahmad (Indonesia) L Natsir	21	21

Semifinals
(South Korea) Shin B-c (South Korea) Chae Y-j	16	13
2	(Indonesia) T Ahmad (Indonesia) L Natsir	21	21

=== Finals ===
Semifinals
1	(China) Zhang Nan (China) Zhao Yunlei	21	21
4	(South Korea) Ko Sung-hyun (South Korea) Kim Ha-na	19	11
(South Korea) Shin Baek-cheol (South Korea) Chae Yoo-jung	16	13
2	(Indonesia) Tontowi Ahmad (Indonesia) Liliyana Natsir	21	21

Final
1	(China) Zhang Nan (China) Zhao Yunlei	16	21	21
2	(Indonesia) Tontowi Ahmad (Indonesia) Liliyana Natsir	21	9	17
