= 2011 BWF Super Series Finals =

Tournament details
- Dates: December 14, 2011 - December 18, 2011
- Total prize money: US$500,000
- Venue: Li-Ning Gymnasium
- Location: Liuzhou, China

Champions
- Men's singles: (China) Lin Dan
- Women's singles: (China) Wang Yihan
- Men's doubles: (Denmark) Mathias Boe (Denmark) Carsten Mogensen
- Women's doubles: (China) Wang Xiaoli (China) Yu Yang
- Mixed doubles: (China) Zhang Nan (China) Zhao Yunlei

The 2011 BWF Super Series Finals was a top level badminton competition which was held from December 14 to December 18, 2011 in Liuzhou, China. The final was held by Chinese Badminton Association and sponsored by Li-Ning. It was the final event of the BWF Super Series competition on the 2011 BWF Super Series schedule. The total purse for the event was $500,000.

== Representatives by nation ==
Top Nations
Rank	Nation	MS	WS	MD	WD	XD	Total	Players
1	China	2	2	2	2	2	10	15^{§}
2	Japan	2	1	1	2	1	7	11
3	South Korea	0	2	2	1	0	5	8
4	Denmark	1	1	1	1	1	5	7^{§}
5	Indonesia	2	0	1	0	1	4	6
6	Chinese Taipei	0	0	0	1	1	2	3^{§}
6	Malaysia	1	0	1	0	0	2	3
8	Hong Kong	0	0	0	1	0	1	2
8	Thailand	0	0	0	0	1	1	2
8	United Kingdom	0	0	0	0	1	1	2
11	Germany	0	1	0	0	0	1	1
11	India	0	1	0	0	0	1	1
Total		8	8	8	8	8	40	61

§: Christinna Pedersen from Denmark, Zhao Yunlei from China and Cheng Wen-Hsing from China Taipei were the players who played in two categories (women's doubles and mixed doubles).

== Performance by nation ==
Nation	Group Phase	Semifinal	Final	Winner
China	10	9	7	4
Indonesia	4			
Japan	7	1		
South Korea	5	3	1	
Denmark	5	5	1	1
Thailand	1			
Malaysia	2	1		
India	1	1	1	
Germany	1			
Hong Kong	1			
United Kingdom	1			
Chinese Taipei	2			

== Men's singles ==
=== Group A ===
Athlete	Pts	Pld	W	L	SF	SA	PF	PA
(Malaysia) Lee Chong Wei	3	3	3	0	6	1	147	105
(Denmark) Peter Gade	2	3	2	1	4	2	120	101
(Japan) Sho Sasaki	1	3	1	2	3	4	122	142
(Indonesia) Simon Santoso	0	3	0	3	0	6	87	128

Date		Score		Set 1	Set 2	Set 3
14 Dec	(Denmark) Peter Gade	2–0	(Indonesia) Simon Santoso	21–13	21–9	
14 Dec	(Malaysia) Lee Chong Wei	2–1	(Japan) Sho Sasaki	21–11	18–21	21–12
15 Dec	(Malaysia) Lee Chong Wei	2–0	(Indonesia) Simon Santoso	21–10	21–15	
15 Dec	(Denmark) Peter Gade	2–0	(Japan) Sho Sasaki	21–15	21–19	
16 Dec	(Japan) Sho Sasaki	2–0	(Indonesia) Simon Santoso	21–19	23–21	
16 Dec	(Malaysia) Lee Chong Wei	2–0	(Denmark) Peter Gade	24–22	21–14	

=== Group B ===
Athlete	Pts	Pld	W	L	SF	SA	PF	PA
(China) Lin Dan	3	3	3	0	6	1	145	108
(China) Chen Long	2	3	2	1	5	3	149	133
(Japan) Kenichi Tago	1	3	1	2	3	5	137	143
(Indonesia) Taufik Hidayat	0	3	0	3	1	6	98	145

Date		Score		Set 1	Set 2	Set 3
14 Dec	(China) Lin Dan	2–1	(China) Chen Long	21–15	19–21	21–17
14 Dec	(Japan) Kenichi Tago	2–1	(Indonesia) Taufik Hidayat	19–21	21–19	21–7
15 Dec	(China) Chen Long	2–1	(Japan) Kenichi Tago	12–21	21–18	21–13
15 Dec	(China) Lin Dan	2–0	(Indonesia) Taufik Hidayat	21–12	21–19	
16 Dec	(China) Lin Dan	2–0	(Japan) Kenichi Tago	21–11	21–13	
16 Dec	(China) Chen Long	2–0	(Indonesia) Taufik Hidayat	21–13	21–7	

=== Finals ===
Semifinals
(Malaysia) Lee Chong Wei	16	21	18
(China) Chen Long	21	16	21
(Denmark) Peter Gade	12	15
(China) Lin Dan	21	21

Final
(China) Chen Long	12	16
(China) Lin Dan	21	21

== Women's singles ==
=== Group A ===
Athlete	Pts	Pld	W	L	SF	SA	PF	PA
(China) Wang Yihan	2	3	2	1	5	3	154	133
(Denmark) Tine Baun	2	3	2	1	4	2	112	87
(South Korea) Sung Ji-hyun	2	3	2	1	4	3	127	144
(Germany) Juliane Schenk	0	3	0	3	1	6	119	148

Date		Score		Set 1	Set 2	Set 3
14 Dec	(South Korea) Sung Ji-hyun	2–1	(China) Wang Yihan	13–21	21–16	21–19
14 Dec	(Denmark) Tine Baun	2–0	(Germany) Juliane Schenk	21–12	21–11	
15 Dec	(South Korea) Sung Ji-hyun	2–0	(Germany) Juliane Schenk	29–27	21–19	
15 Dec	(China) Wang Yihan	2–0	(Denmark) Tine Baun	21–16	21–12	
16 Dec	(China) Wang Yihan	2–1	(Germany) Juliane Schenk	14–21	21–14	21–15
16 Dec	(Denmark) Tine Baun	2–0	(South Korea) Sung Ji-hyun	21–13	21–9	

=== Group B ===
Athlete	Pts	Pld	W	L	SF	SA	PF	PA
(India) Saina Nehwal	3	3	3	0	6	1	144	115
(China) Wang Xin	2	3	2	1	4	3	134	101
(Japan) Sayaka Sato	1	3	1	2	2	5	105	137
(South Korea) Bae Youn-joo	0	3	0	3	3	6	144	174

Date		Score		Set 1	Set 2	Set 3
14 Dec	(India) Saina Nehwal	2–1	(South Korea) Bae Youn-joo	21–14	17–21	21–14
14 Dec	(China) Wang Xin	2–0	(Japan) Sayaka Sato	21–7	21–9	
15 Dec	(China) Wang Xin	2–1	(South Korea) Bae Youn-joo	21–8	13–21	21–13
15 Dec	(India) Saina Nehwal	2–0	(Japan) Sayaka Sato	21–16	21–13	
16 Dec	(Japan) Sayaka Sato	2–1	(South Korea) Bae Youn-joo	18–21	21–17	21–15
16 Dec	(India) Saina Nehwal	2–0	(China) Wang Xin	21–17	22–20	

=== Finals ===
Semifinals
(China) Wang Yihan	21	21
(China) Wang Xin	19	16
(Denmark) Tine Baun	17	18
(India) Saina Nehwal	21	21

Final
(China) Wang Yihan	18	21	21
(India) Saina Nehwal	21	13	13

== Men's doubles ==
=== Group A ===
Athlete	Pts	Pld	W	L	SF	SA	PF	PA
(South Korea) Ko Sung-hyun (South Korea) Yoo Yeon-seong	2	3	2	1	5	2	134	132
(China) Chai Biao (China) Guo Zhendong	2	3	2	1	4	3	134	127
(China) Cai Yun (China) Fu Haifeng	1	3	1	2	3	5	152	147
(Japan) Hirokatsu Hashimoto (Japan) Noriyasu Hirata	1	3	1	2	3	5	138	152

Date		Score		Set 1	Set 2	Set 3
14 Dec	(Japan) Hirokatsu Hashimoto (Japan) Noriyasu Hirata	2–1	(South Korea) Ko Sung-hyun (South Korea) Yoo Yeon-seong	21–19	18–21	21–9
14 Dec	(China) Chai Biao (China) Guo Zhendong	2–1	(China) Cai Yun (China) Fu Haifeng	21–15	14–21	21–19
15 Dec	(China) Cai Yun (China) Fu Haifeng	2–1	(Japan) Hirokatsu Hashimoto (Japan) Noriyasu Hirata	21–12	19–21	21–15
15 Dec	(South Korea) Ko Sung-hyun (South Korea) Yoo Yeon-seong	2–0	(China) Chai Biao (China) Guo Zhendong	21–17	21–19	
16 Dec	(China) Chai Biao (China) Guo Zhendong	2–0	(Japan) Hirokatsu Hashimoto (Japan) Noriyasu Hirata	21–16	21–14	
16 Dec	(South Korea) Ko Sung-hyun (South Korea) Yoo Yeon-seong	2–0	(China) Cai Yun (China) Fu Haifeng	22–20	21–16	

=== Group B ===
Athlete	Pts	Pld	W	L	SF	SA	PF	PA
(South Korea) Jung Jae-sung (South Korea) Lee Yong-dae	3	3	3	0	6	1	146	119
(Denmark) Mathias Boe (Denmark) Carsten Mogensen	2	3	2	1	4	3	130	118
(Indonesia) Mohammad Ahsan (Indonesia) Bona Septano	1	3	1	2	3	5	154	158
(Malaysia) Koo Kien Keat (Malaysia) Tan Boon Heong	0	3	0	3	2	6	128	163

Date		Score		Set 1	Set 2	Set 3
14 Dec	(South Korea) Jung Jae-sung (South Korea) Lee Yong-dae	2–1	(Malaysia) Koo Kien Keat (Malaysia) Tan Boon Heong	18–21	21–15	21–18
14 Dec	(Denmark) Mathias Boe (Denmark) Carsten Mogensen	2–1	(Indonesia) Mohammad Ahsan (Indonesia) Bona Septano	21–16	18–21	21–19
15 Dec	(Denmark) Mathias Boe (Denmark) Carsten Mogensen	2–0	(Malaysia) Koo Kien Keat (Malaysia) Tan Boon Heong	21–14	21–6	
15 Dec	(South Korea) Jung Jae-sung (South Korea) Lee Yong-dae	2–0	(Indonesia) Mohammad Ahsan (Indonesia) Bona Septano	23–21	21–6	
16 Dec	(South Korea) Jung Jae-sung (South Korea) Lee Yong-dae	2–0	(Denmark) Mathias Boe (Denmark) Carsten Mogensen	21–15	21–13	
16 Dec	(Indonesia) Mohammad Ahsan (Indonesia) Bona Septano	2–1	(Malaysia) Koo Kien Keat (Malaysia) Tan Boon Heong	19–21	21–19	21–14

=== Finals ===
Semifinals
(South Korea) Ko Sung-hyun (South Korea) Yoo Yeon-seong	21	12	13
(Denmark) Mathias Boe (Denmark) Carsten Mogensen	16	21	21
(China) Chai Biao (China) Guo Zhendong	21	21
(South Korea) Jung Jae-sung (South Korea) Lee Yong-dae	17	18

Final
(Denmark) Mathias Boe (Denmark) Carsten Mogensen	25	21
(China) Chai Biao (China) Guo Zhendong	23	7

== Women's doubles ==
=== Group A ===
Athlete	Pts	Pld	W	L	SF	SA	PF	PA
(China) Wang Xiaoli (China) Yu Yang	3	3	3	0	6	0	126	72
(South Korea) Ha Jung-eun (South Korea) Kim Min-jung	1	3	1	2	3	4	122	143
(Chinese Taipei) Cheng Wen-Hsing (Chinese Taipei) Chien Yu-Chin	1	3	1	2	2	4	106	117
(Hong Kong) Poon Lok Yan (Hong Kong) Tse Ying Suet	1	3	1	2	2	5	118	140

Date		Score		Set 1	Set 2	Set 3
14 Dec	(China) Wang Xiaoli (China) Yu Yang	2–0	(Hong Kong) Poon Lok Yan (Hong Kong) Tse Ying Suet	21–9	21–11	
14 Dec	(South Korea) Ha Jung-eun (South Korea) Kim Min-jung	2–0	(Chinese Taipei) Cheng Wen-Hsing (Chinese Taipei) Chien Yu-Chin	21–18	21–18	
15 Dec	(Hong Kong) Poon Lok Yan (Hong Kong) Tse Ying Suet	2–1	(South Korea) Ha Jung-eun (South Korea) Kim Min-jung	21–23	23–21	21–12
15 Dec	(China) Wang Xiaoli (China) Yu Yang	2–0	(Chinese Taipei) Cheng Wen-Hsing (Chinese Taipei) Chien Yu-Chin	21–17	21–11	
16 Dec	(China) Wang Xiaoli (China) Yu Yang	2–0	(South Korea) Ha Jung-eun (South Korea) Kim Min-jung	21–15	21–9	
16 Dec	(Chinese Taipei) Cheng Wen-Hsing (Chinese Taipei) Chien Yu-Chin	2–0	(Hong Kong) Poon Lok Yan (Hong Kong) Tse Ying Suet	21–16	21–17	

=== Group B ===
Athlete	Pts	Pld	W	L	SF	SA	PF	PA
(Denmark) Christinna Pedersen (Denmark) Kamilla Rytter Juhl	2	3	2	1	5	2	130	114
(China) Tian Qing (China) Zhao Yunlei	2	3	2	1	5	3	157	130
(Japan) Mizuki Fujii (Japan) Reika Kakiiwa	2	3	2	1	4	4	142	143
(Japan) Shizuka Matsuo (Japan) Mami Naito	0	3	0	3	1	6	95	137

Date		Score		Set 1	Set 2	Set 3
14 Dec	(China) Tian Qing (China) Zhao Yunlei	2–1	(Denmark) Christinna Pedersen (Denmark) Kamilla Rytter Juhl	21–10	20–22	21–14
14 Dec	(Japan) Mizuki Fujii (Japan) Reika Kakiiwa	2–1	(Japan) Shizuka Matsuo (Japan) Mami Naito	11–21	21–17	21–10
15 Dec	(Denmark) Christinna Pedersen (Denmark) Kamilla Rytter Juhl	2–0	(Japan) Mizuki Fujii (Japan) Reika Kakiiwa	21–13	21–14	
15 Dec	(China) Tian Qing (China) Zhao Yunlei	2–0	(Japan) Shizuka Matsuo (Japan) Mami Naito	21–14	21–8	
16 Dec	(Japan) Mizuki Fujii (Japan) Reika Kakiiwa	2–1	(China) Tian Qing (China) Zhao Yunlei	20–22	21–13	21–18
16 Dec	(Denmark) Christinna Pedersen (Denmark) Kamilla Rytter Juhl	2–0	(Japan) Shizuka Matsuo (Japan) Mami Naito	21–12	21–13	

=== Finals ===
Semifinals
(China) Wang Xiaoli (China) Yu Yang
(China) Tian Qing (China) Zhao Yunlei	w/o
(South Korea) Ha Jung-eun (South Korea) Kim Min-jung	23	21
(Denmark) Christinna Pedersen (Denmark) Kamilla Rytter Juhl	21	18

Final
(China) Wang Xiaoli (China) Yu Yang	21	21
(South Korea) Ha Jung-eun (South Korea) Kim Min-jung	8	12

== Mixed doubles ==
=== Group A ===
Athlete	Pts	Pld	W	L	SF	SA	PF	PA
(China) Zhang Nan (China) Zhao Yunlei	3	3	3	0	6	2	163	139
(China) Xu Chen (China) Ma Jin	2	3	2	1	5	3	159	129
(Indonesia) Tontowi Ahmad (Indonesia) Lilyana Natsir	1	3	1	2	4	4	144	142
(United Kingdom) Robert Blair (United Kingdom) Gabrielle White	0	3	0	3	0	6	70	126

Date		Score		Set 1	Set 2	Set 3
14 Dec	(China) Zhang Nan (China) Zhao Yunlei	2–1	(China) Xu Chen (China) Ma Jin	21–18	19–21	21–18
14 Dec	(Indonesia) Tontowi Ahmad (Indonesia) Lilyana Natsir	2–0	(United Kingdom) Robert Blair (United Kingdom) Gabrielle White	21–10	21–12	
15 Dec	(China) Xu Chen (China) Ma Jin	2–1	(Indonesia) Tontowi Ahmad (Indonesia) Lilyana Natsir	17–21	21–7	22–20
15 Dec	(China) Zhang Nan (China) Zhao Yunlei	2–0	(United Kingdom) Robert Blair (United Kingdom) Gabrielle White	21–10	21–18	
16 Dec	(China) Zhang Nan (China) Zhao Yunlei	2–1	(Indonesia) Tontowi Ahmad (Indonesia) Lilyana Natsir	21–19	18–21	21–14
16 Dec	(China) Xu Chen (China) Ma Jin	2–0	(United Kingdom) Robert Blair (United Kingdom) Gabrielle White	21–12	21–8	

=== Group B ===
Athlete	Pts	Pld	W	L	SF	SA	PF	PA
(Denmark) Joachim Fischer Nielsen (Denmark) Christinna Pedersen	3	3	3	0	6	0	126	97
(Japan) Shintaro Ikeda (Japan) Reiko Shiota	1	3	1	2	3	4	124	135
(Chinese Taipei) Chen Hung-ling (Chinese Taipei) Cheng Wen-Hsing	1	3	1	2	3	5	147	153
(Thailand) Sudket Prapakamol (Thailand) Saralee Thungthongkam	1	3	1	2	2	5	121	133

Date		Score		Set 1	Set 2	Set 3
14 Dec	(Denmark) Joachim Fischer Nielsen (Denmark) Christinna Pedersen	2–0	(Thailand) Sudket Prapakamol (Thailand) Saralee Thungthongkam	21–15	21–17	
14 Dec	(Chinese Taipei) Chen Hung-ling (Chinese Taipei) Cheng Wen-Hsing	2–1	(Japan) Shintaro Ikeda (Japan) Reiko Shiota	19–21	21–16	21–17
15 Dec	(Thailand) Sudket Prapakamol (Thailand) Saralee Thungthongkam	2–1	(Chinese Taipei) Chen Hung-ling (Chinese Taipei) Cheng Wen-Hsing	15–21	21–16	21–12
15 Dec	(Denmark) Joachim Fischer Nielsen (Denmark) Christinna Pedersen	2–0	(Japan) Shintaro Ikeda (Japan) Reiko Shiota	21–15	21–13	
16 Dec	(Denmark) Joachim Fischer Nielsen (Denmark) Christinna Pedersen	2–0	(Chinese Taipei) Chen Hung-ling (Chinese Taipei) Cheng Wen-Hsing	21–19	21–18	
16 Dec	(Japan) Shintaro Ikeda (Japan) Reiko Shiota	2–0	(Thailand) Sudket Prapakamol (Thailand) Saralee Thungthongkam	21–14	21–18	

=== Finals ===
Semifinals
(China) Zhang Nan (China) Zhao Yunlei	21	21
(Japan) Shintaro Ikeda (Japan) Reiko Shiota	17	11
(China) Xu Chen (China) Ma Jin	21	21
(Denmark) Joachim Fischer Nielsen (Denmark) Christinna Pedersen	19	14

Final
(China) Zhang Nan (China) Zhao Yunlei	21	21
(China) Xu Chen (China) Ma Jin	13	15
