= Lu Lan =

Chinese badminton player (born 1987)

Lu Lan 卢兰
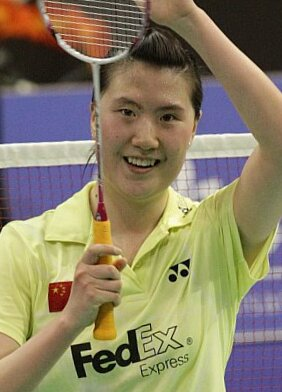
- Lu in 2009

Personal information
- Born: 2 May 1987 (age 39) Changzhou, Jiangsu, China
- Height: 1.76 m (5 ft 9 in)
- Weight: 64 kg (141 lb)
- Spouse: Peng Xin (m. 2013)

Sport
- Country: China
- Sport: Badminton
- Handedness: Right

Women's singles
- Highest ranking: 5 (21 January 2010)
- BWF profile
Medal record
Women's badminton
Representing China
World Championships
Gold medal – first place	2009 Hyderabad	Women's singles
Bronze medal – third place	2007 Kuala Lumpur	Women's singles
World Cup
Bronze medal – third place	2005 Yiyang	Women's singles
Uber Cup
Gold medal – first place	2008 Jakarta	Women's team
Gold medal – first place	2006 Sendai & Tokyo	Women's team
Asian Games
Gold medal – first place	2010 Guangzhou	Women's team
Asian Championships
Silver medal – second place	2011 Chengdu	Women's singles
Silver medal – second place	2007 Johor Bahru	Women's singles
World Junior Championships
Gold medal – first place	2004 Richmond	Mixed team
Silver medal – second place	2004 Richmond	Girls' singles
Asian Junior Championships
Gold medal – first place	2004 Hwacheon	Girls' team
Silver medal – second place	2004 Hwacheon	Girls' singles

Lu Lan
- Traditional Chinese: 盧蘭
- Simplified Chinese: 卢兰
Transcriptions
Standard Mandarin
- Hanyu Pinyin: Lú Lán

Lu Lan (Chinese: 卢兰; born 2 May 1987) is a badminton player from China.

== Career ==
In 2004, she won the Polish Open. In 2006, she won the Korea Open and finished the year in the 5th position in the BWF World Ranking.

In 2007, she won the Denmark Super Series, and was a bronze medalist at the World Championships in Kuala Lumpur, losing to the eventual champion Zhu Lin in the semifinals.

In the 2008 Beijing Olympic Games, she lost to Xie Xingfang 21–7, 10–21, 12–21 in the semi-finals and was then upset by Maria Kristin Yulianti from Indonesia 21–11, 13–21, 15–21 in the bronze medal match. Earlier in 2008 she had reached the final of the prestigious All-England Championships where she lost a very close match to Denmark's Tine Rasmussen.

In 2009, she achieved her greatest success to date when she won the 2009 BWF World Championship Women's Singles title in Hyderabad, India. The match was against compatriot, and two times winner of the event (2005 and 2006), Xie Xingfang; winning in two straight games 23–21, 21–12.

After retiring from the tournament in 2013, she continued her education at the Beijing Sport University. She married Peng Xin in September 2013, and lived in Shanghai. She then became an official umpire on the BWF World Tour, the first renowned player who successfully transitioned to an officiating job in the sport.

== Achievements ==
=== BWF World Championships ===
Women's singles
Year	Venue	Opponent	Score	Result
2007	Putra Indoor Stadium; Kuala Lumpur, Malaysia	(China) Zhu Lin	10–21, 13–21	Bronze
2009	Gachibowli Indoor Stadium; Hyderabad, India	(China) Xie Xingfang	23–21, 21–12	Gold

=== World Cup ===
Women's singles

Year	Venue	Partner	Score	Result
2005	Olympic Park, Yiyang, China	(China) Xie Xingfang	11–21, 19–21	Bronze

=== Asian Championships ===
Women's singles
Year	Venue	Opponent	Score	Result
2007	Bandaraya Stadium; Johor Bahru, Malaysia	(China) Jiang Yanjiao	23–25, 21–23	Silver
2011	Sichuan Gymnasium; Chengdu, China	(China) Wang Yihan	15–21, 21–23	Silver

=== World Junior Championships ===
Girls' singles
Year	Venue	Opponent	Score	Result
2004	Minoru Arena; Richmond, Canada	(Chinese Taipei) Cheng Shao-chieh	7–11, 5–11	Silver

=== Asian Junior Championships ===
Girls' singles
Year	Venue	Opponent	Score	Result
2004	Hwacheon Indoor Stadium; Hwacheon, South Korea	(China) Jiang Yanjiao	9–11, 2–11	Silver

=== BWF Superseries ===
The BWF Superseries, launched on 14 December 2006 and implemented in 2007, is a series of elite badminton tournaments, sanctioned by Badminton World Federation (BWF). BWF Superseries has two levels: Superseries and Superseries Premier. A season of Superseries features twelve tournaments around the world, which introduced since 2011, with successful players invited to the Superseries Finals held at the year end.

Women's singles
Year	Tournament	Opponent	Score	Result
2007	Swiss Open	(China) Zhang Ning	16–21, 18–21	(silver) Runner-up
2007	Denmark Open	(China) Zhang Ning	21–17, 21–14	(gold) Winner
2008	Korea Open	(Hong Kong) Zhou Mi	18–21, 21–15, 15–21	(silver) Runner-up
2008	All England Open	(Denmark) Tine Rasmussen	11–21, 21–18, 20–22	(silver) Runner-up

BWF Super Series Finals tournament
BWF Super Series Premier tournament
BWF Super Series tournament

=== BWF Grand Prix ===
The BWF Grand Prix has two levels, the Grand Prix and Grand Prix Gold. It is a series of badminton tournaments sanctioned by the Badminton World Federation (BWF) since 2007. The World Badminton Grand Prix has been sanctioned by the International Badminton Federation since 1983.

Women's singles
Year	Tournament	Opponent	Score	Result
2006	German Open	(China) Zhang Ning	8–11, 3–11	(silver) Runner-up
2006	Indonesia Open	(China) Zhu Lin	11–21, 16–21	(silver) Runner-up
2006	Korea Open	(China) Zhu Lin	21–18, 21–11	(gold) Winner
2006	Denmark Open	(China) Jiang Yanjiao	14–21, 14–21	(silver) Runner-up
2008	India Open	(Hong Kong) Zhou Mi	14–21, 14–21	(silver) Runner-up
2008	Thailand Open	(China) Xie Xingfang	24–26, 7–21	(silver) Runner-up
2011	Russian Open	(China) Chen Xiaojia	20–22, 21–15, 23–21	(gold) Winner

BWF Grand Prix Gold tournament
BWF Grand Prix tournament

=== IBF International ===
Women's singles
Year	Tournament	Opponent	Score	Result
2004	Polish International	(China) Zhu Lin	11–7, 11–2	(gold) Winner

== Record against selected opponents ==
Record against year-end Finals finalists, World Championships semi-finalists, and Olympic quarter-finalists.

Players	Matches	Results		Difference
Players	Matches	Won	Lost	Difference
(Australia) Huang Chia-chi	1	1	0	+1
(Bulgaria) Petya Nedelcheva	2	2	0	+2
(China) Li Xuerui	2	1	1	0
(China) Wang Lin	5	4	1	+3
(China) Wang Shixian	3	1	2	–1
(China) Wang Yihan	9	4	5	–1
(China) Xie Xingfang	12	3	9	–6
(China) Zhang Ning	4	1	3	–2
(China) Zhu Lin	10	7	3	+4
(Chinese Taipei) Cheng Shao-chieh	6	4	2	+2
(Chinese Taipei) Tai Tzu-ying	2	0	2	–2
(Denmark) Tine Baun	6	2	4	–2
(England) Tracey Hallam	4	4	0	+4
(France) Pi Hongyan	3	1	2	–1

Players	Matches	Results		Difference
Players	Matches	Won	Lost	Difference
(Germany) Juliane Schenk	1	1	0	+1
(Germany) Xu Huaiwen	7	5	2	+3
(Hong Kong) Wang Chen	8	6	2	+4
(Hong Kong) Yip Pui Yin	4	3	1	+2
(Hong Kong) Zhou Mi	7	1	6	–5
(India) Saina Nehwal	5	1	4	–3
(Indonesia) Maria Kristin Yulianti	5	3	2	+1
(Malaysia) Wong Mew Choo	6	3	3	0
(Netherlands) Mia Audina	4	2	2	0
(South Korea) Bae Yeon-ju	1	1	0	+1
(South Korea) Sung Ji-hyun	2	1	1	0
(Thailand) Porntip Buranaprasertsuk	2	2	0	+2
(Thailand) Ratchanok Intanon	2	1	1	0
