= Cheng Shao-chieh =

Taiwanese badminton player

Cheng Shao-chieh 鄭韶婕
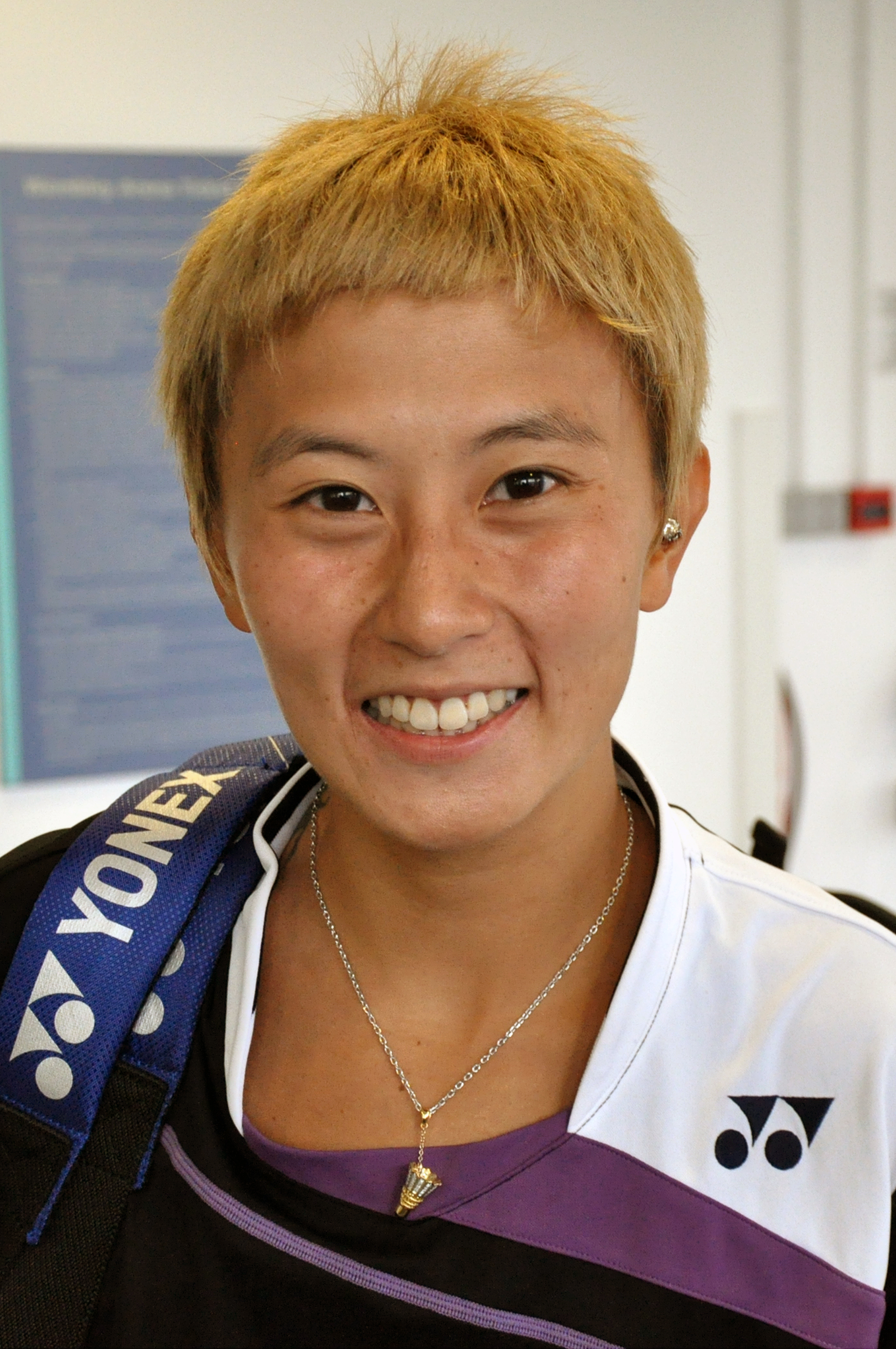
- Cheng Shao-chieh in 2011

Personal information
- Born: 4 January 1986 (age 40) Taipei, Taiwan
- Height: 1.58 m (5 ft 2 in)
- Weight: 47 kg (104 lb; 7.4 st)

Sport
- Country: Republic of China (Taiwan)
- Sport: Badminton
- Handedness: Right

Women's singles
- Highest ranking: 7 (8 September 2011)
- BWF profile
Medal record
Women's badminton
Representing Chinese Taipei
World Championships
Silver medal – second place	2011 London	Women's singles
Bronze medal – third place	2005 Anaheim	Women's singles
Uber Cup
Bronze medal – third place	2006 Sendai-Tokyo	Women's team
Asian Championships
Bronze medal – third place	2005 Hyderabad	Women's singles
Bronze medal – third place	2011 Chengdu	Women's singles
Summer Universiade
Gold medal – first place	2011 Shenzhen	Women's singles
Silver medal – second place	2007 Bangkok	Women's singles
Silver medal – second place	2011 Shenzhen	Women's doubles
Bronze medal – third place	2007 Bangkok	Mixed team
Bronze medal – third place	2011 Shenzhen	Mixed team
World Junior Championships
Gold medal – first place	2004 Richmond	Girls' singles
Bronze medal – third place	2004 Richmond	Mixed doubles
Asian Junior Championships
Silver medal – second place	2001 Taipei	Girls' team
Bronze medal – third place	2001 Taipei	Girls' doubles
Bronze medal – third place	2004 Hwacheon	Girls' team

Cheng Shao-chieh (Chinese: 鄭韶婕; pinyin: Zhèng Sháojié; Wade–Giles: Cheng Shao-chieh; born 4 January 1986) is a badminton player from Taiwan.

Cheng played badminton at the 2004 Summer Olympics for the Republic of China as Chinese Taipei. In women's singles, she defeated Ling Wan Ting of Hong Kong and Jun Jae-youn of South Korea in the first two rounds. In the quarterfinals, Cheng lost to Gong Ruina of China 3–11, 3–11. Later that year, she played in the 2004 World Junior Championships, held in Richmond, Canada, where she won the gold title in girls' singles. She also participated in the 2005 World Championships in Anaheim, California, making it to the semifinals and taking a game from the eventual champion, Xie Xingfang. She achieved a world championship silver medal in 2011 in London. She reached the final, winning all her matches in straight games. In the quarterfinal she beat the then world number 1, Wang Shixian from China, and in the semifinal she outclassed Juliane Schenk from Germany 18 and 6. At the 2012 Summer Olympics, she again reached the quarter-finals, qualifying through from group C. She then beat Gu Juan in the second round before losing to Wang Yihan.

== Achievements ==
=== World Championships ===
Women's singles
Year	Venue	Opponent	Score	Result
2005	Arrowhead Pond, Anaheim, United States	(China) Xie Xingfang	11–2, 5–11, 6–11	Bronze
2011	Wembley Arena, London, England	(China) Wang Yihan	15–21, 10–21	Silver

=== Asian Championships ===
Women's singles
Year	Venue	Opponent	Score	Result
2005	Gachibowli Indoor Stadium, Hyderabad, India	(Hong Kong) Wang Chen	8–11, 2–11	Bronze
2011	Sichuan Gymnasium, Chengdu, China	(China) Wang Yihan	19–21, 21–23	Bronze

=== Summer Universiade ===
Women's singles
Year	Venue	Opponent	Score	Result
2007	Thammasat University, Bangkok, Thailand	(China) Wang Yihan	12–21, 17–21	Silver
2011	Gymnasium of SZIIT, Shenzhen, China	(Chinese Taipei) Pai Hsiao-ma	21–18, 21–15	Gold

Women's doubles
Year	Venue	Partner	Opponent	Score	Result
2011	Gymnasium of SZIIT, Shenzhen, China	(Chinese Taipei) Pai Hsiao-ma	(South Korea) Eom Hye-won (South Korea) Jang Ye-na	11–21, 14–21	Silver

=== World University Championships ===
Women's singles
Year	Venue	Opponent	Score	Result
2004	Kasetsart University, Bangkok, Thailand	(Thailand) Soratja Chansrisukot	11–5, 5–11, 11–6	Gold

=== World Junior Championships ===
Girls' singles
Year	Venue	Opponent	Score	Result
2004	Minoru Arena, Richmond, Canada	(China) Lu Lan	11–7, 11–5	Gold

Mixed doubles
Year	Venue	Partner	Opponent	Score	Result
2004	Minoru Arena, Richmond, Canada	(Chinese Taipei) Lee Sheng-mu	(China) He Hanbin (China) Yu Yang	3–15, 1–15	Bronze

=== Asian Junior Championships ===
Girls' doubles
Year	Venue	Partner	Opponent	Score	Result
2001	Taipei Gymnasium, Taipei, Taiwan	(Chinese Taipei) Cheng Hsiao-yun	(Indonesia) Lita Nurlita (Indonesia) Endang Nursugianti	13–15, 11–15	Bronze

=== BWF Superseries ===
The BWF Superseries, which was launched on 14 December 2006 and implemented in 2007, was a series of elite badminton tournaments, sanctioned by the Badminton World Federation (BWF). BWF Superseries levels were Superseries and Superseries Premier. A season of Superseries consisted of twelve tournaments around the world that had been introduced since 2011. Successful players were invited to the Superseries Finals, which were held at the end of each year.

Women's singles
Year	Tournament	Opponent	Score	Result
2012	Singapore Open	(Germany) Juliane Schenk	11–21, 24–26	(silver) Runner-up

BWF Super Series Finals tournament
BWF Super Series Premier tournament
BWF Super Series tournament

=== BWF Grand Prix ===
The BWF Grand Prix had two levels, the Grand Prix and Grand Prix Gold. It was a series of badminton tournaments sanctioned by the Badminton World Federation (BWF) and played between 2007 and 2017.

Women's singles
Year	Tournament	Opponent	Score	Result
2009	Chinese Taipei Open	(South Korea) Bae Seung-hee	17–21, 21–12, 21–15	(gold) Winner
2010	Chinese Taipei Open	(South Korea) Bae Seung-hee	21–11, 24–26, 21–17	(gold) Winner
2010	Indonesia Grand Prix Gold	(Thailand) Ratchanok Intanon	12–21, 21–19, 16–21	(silver) Runner-up
2011	Canada Open	(France) Pi Hongyan	21–15, 21–11	(gold) Winner

BWF Grand Prix Gold tournament
BWF Grand Prix tournament

=== BWF International Challenge/Series ===
Women's singles
Year	Tournament	Opponent	Score	Result
2004	Austrian Open	(Chinese Taipei) Huang Chia-chi	8–11, 11–8, 11–3	(gold) Winner

== Record against selected opponents ==
Record against year-end Finals finalists, World Championships semi-finalists, and Olympic quarter-finalists.

Players	Matches	Results		Difference
Players	Matches	Won	Lost	Difference
(Bulgaria) Petya Nedelcheva	1	1	0	+1
(China) Gong Ruina	1	0	1	–1
(China) Li Xuerui	3	1	2	–1
(China) Lu Lan	6	2	4	–2
(China) Wang Lin	4	2	2	0
(China) Wang Shixian	5	2	3	–1
(China) Wang Xin	2	0	2	–2
(China) Wang Yihan	5	0	5	–5
(China) Xie Xingfang	5	2	3	–1
(China) Zhang Ning	2	0	2	–2
(China) Zhu Lin	2	0	2	–2
(Chinese Taipei) Huang Chia-chi	1	1	0	+1
(Chinese Taipei) Tai Tzu-ying	1	1	0	+1
(Denmark) Tine Baun	3	0	3	–3
(Denmark) Camilla Martin	1	0	1	–1
(England) Tracey Hallam	3	1	2	–1
(France) Pi Hongyan	5	2	3	–1

Players	Matches	Results		Difference
Players	Matches	Won	Lost	Difference
(Germany) Petra Overzier	1	0	1	–1
(Germany) Juliane Schenk	9	5	4	+1
(Germany) Xu Huaiwen	4	0	4	–4
(Hong Kong) Wang Chen	9	1	8	–7
(Hong Kong) Yip Pui Yin	4	1	3	–2
(India) Saina Nehwal	4	1	3	–2
(Indonesia) Lindaweni Fanetri	1	0	1	–1
(Indonesia) Maria Kristin Yulianti	1	0	1	–1
(Japan) Minatsu Mitani	1	1	0	+1
(Japan) Nozomi Okuhara	1	1	0	+1
(Malaysia) Wong Mew Choo	4	2	2	0
(Netherlands) Mia Audina	2	0	2	–2
(South Korea) Bae Yeon-ju	7	4	3	+1
(South Korea) Sung Ji-hyun	2	0	2	–2
(Spain) Carolina Marín	2	1	1	0
(Thailand) Porntip Buranaprasertsuk	3	2	1	+1
(Thailand) Ratchanok Intanon	5	1	4	–3
