= Wang Lin (badminton) =

Chinese badminton player

Wang Lin 王琳
Personal information
- Born: March 30, 1989 (age 37) Hangzhou, China
- Height: 1.74 m (5 ft 9 in)
- Weight: 57 kg (126 lb)

Sport
- Country: China
- Sport: Badminton
- Handedness: Right
- Coached by: Zhang Ning

Women's singles
- Highest ranking: 1 (8 October 2009)
- Current ranking: Retired (in 2013)
- BWF profile
Medal record
Women's badminton
Representing China
World Championships
Gold medal – first place	2010 Paris	Women's singles
Bronze medal – third place	2009 Hyderabad	Women's singles
Sudirman Cup
Gold medal – first place	2009 Guangzhou	Mixed team
Asian Championships
Silver medal – second place	2008 Johor Bahru	Women's singles
Bronze medal – third place	2009 Suwon	Women's singles
Summer Universiade
Silver medal – second place	2007 Bangkok	Mixed team
Bronze medal – third place	2007 Bangkok	Women's singles
Bronze medal – third place	2007 Bangkok	Women's doubles
World Junior Championships
Gold medal – first place	2007 Waitakere City	Girls' singles
Gold medal – first place	2007 Waitakere City	Mixed team
Gold medal – first place	2004 Richmond	Mixed team
Bronze medal – third place	2004 Richmond	Girls' singles
Asian Junior Championships
Gold medal – first place	2005 Jakarta	Girls' singles
Gold medal – first place	2005 Jakarta	Girls' team
Gold medal – first place	2004 Hwacheon	Girls' team
Bronze medal – third place	2004 Hwacheon	Girls' singles

Wang Lin (born March 30, 1989, in Hangzhou) is a badminton player from China. Wang Lin was crowned the world champion after winning the gold medal at the 2010 BWF World Championships held at Paris defeating fellow Chinese Wang Xin 21–11, 19–21, 21–13.

In 2006, the 17-year-old, Wang Lin beat Xie Xingfang in the final of the China Masters Super Series.

Shortly after her World Championship triumph in Paris, Wang Lin suffered a severe knee ligament tear during her match against Maria Febe Kusumastuti in China Masters Super Series tournament. The injury was so severe to the extent it ruled out Wang Lin completely from playing for almost six months after her knee operation. From there, her ranking starts to decline and eventually Wang Lin fell out of favour from the first-team line-up as her jittery comeback coincided with the emergence of Wang Shixian and Wang Xin.

After making a comeback, she was clearly far from her best and has not achieved the same success as she once did prior to sustaining the injury. Wang Lin once cited fear of injury recurrence was one of the main reasons she was not able to play at her best.

On December 4, 2013, she announced her retirement on Tencent Weibo.

== Achievements ==
=== BWF World Championships ===
Women's singles
Year	Venue	Opponent	Score	Result
2010	Stade Pierre de Coubertin; Paris, France	(China) Wang Xin	21–11, 19–21, 21–13	Gold
2009	Gachibowli Indoor Stadium; Hyderabad, India	(China) Lu Lan	18–21, 19–21	Bronze

=== Asian Championships ===
Women's singles
Year	Venue	Opponent	Score	Result
2009	Suwon Indoor Stadium; Suwon, South Korea	(China) Zhu Lin	12–21, 16–21	Bronze
2008	Bandaraya Stadium; Johor Bahru, Malaysia	(China) Jiang Yanjiao	21–18, 18–21, 13–21	Silver

=== Summer Universiade ===
Women's singles
Year	Venue	Opponent	Score	Result
2007	Thammasat University; Pathum Thani, Thailand	(Chinese Taipei) Cheng Shao-chieh	19–21, 9–21	Bronze

Women's doubles
Year	Venue	Partner	Opponent	Score	Result
2007	Thammasat University; Pathum Thani, Thailand	(China) Zhang Dan	(Chinese Taipei) Chien Yu-chin (Chinese Taipei) Cheng Wen-hsing	19–21, 12–21	Bronze

=== World Junior Championships ===
Girls' singles
Year	Venue	Opponent	Score	Result
2007	Waitakere Trusts Stadium; Waitakere City, New Zealand	(South Korea) Bae Youn-joo	21–16, 21–15	Gold
2004	Minoru Arena; Richmond, Canada	(China) Lu Lan	Walkover	Bronze

=== Asian Junior Championships ===
Girls' singles
Year	Venue	Opponent	Score	Result
2005	Tennis Indoor Senayan; Jakarta, Indonesia	(China) Wang Yihan	11–4, 11–9	Gold
2004	Hwacheon Indoor Stadium; Hwacheon, South Korea	(China) Lu Lan	9–11, 3–11	Bronze

=== BWF Superseries ===
The BWF Superseries, launched on 14 December 2006 and implemented in 2007, is a series of elite badminton tournaments, sanctioned by Badminton World Federation (BWF). BWF Superseries has two levels: Superseries and Superseries Premier. A season of Superseries features twelve tournaments around the world, which introduced since 2011, with successful players invited to the Superseries Finals held at the year end.

Women's singles
Year	Tournament	Opponent	Score	Result
2009	French Open	(China) Wang Yihan	9–21, 12–21	(silver) Runner-up
2009	China Masters	(China) Wang Shixian	14–21, 21–14, 14–21	(silver) Runner-up
2009	Indonesia Open	(India) Saina Nehwal	21–12, 18–21, 9–21	(silver) Runner-up
2008	French Open	(China) Xie Xingfang	21–18, 13–21, 21–11	(gold) Winner
2008	Denmark Open	(Hong Kong) Zhou Mi	21–18, 21–10	(gold) Winner
2008	China Masters	(Hong Kong) Zhou Mi	19–21, 21–19, 16–21	(silver) Runner-up

BWF Super Series Finals tournament
BWF Super Series Premier tournament
BWF Super Series tournament

=== IBF World Grand Prix ===
The World Badminton Grand Prix has been sanctioned by the International Badminton Federation since 1983.

Women's singles
Year	Tournament	Opponent	Score	Result
2006	China Masters	(China) Xie Xingfang	15–21, 21–13, 21–15	(gold) Winner

== Record against selected opponents ==
Record against year-end Finals finalists, World Championships semi-finalists, and Olympic quarter-finalists.

Players	Matches	Results		Difference
Players	Matches	Won	Lost	Difference
(Bulgaria) Petya Nedelcheva	1	1	0	+1
(China) Li Xuerui	1	0	1	–1
(China) Lu Lan	6	1	5	–4
(China) Wang Shixian	3	0	3	–3
(China) Wang Xin	3	2	1	+1
(China) Wang Yihan	3	1	2	–1
(China) Xie Xingfang	5	3	2	+1
(China) Zhang Ning	2	1	1	0
(China) Zhu Lin	2	1	1	0
(Chinese Taipei) Cheng Shao-chieh	4	2	2	0
(Chinese Taipei) Tai Tzu-ying	2	0	2	–2
(Denmark) Tine Baun	4	2	2	0
(England) Tracey Hallam	1	0	1	–1
(France) Pi Hongyan	2	1	1	0

Players	Matches	Results		Difference
Players	Matches	Won	Lost	Difference
(Germany) Juliane Schenk	3	1	2	–1
(Germany) Xu Huaiwen	7	2	5	–3
(Hong Kong) Wang Chen	5	1	4	–3
(Hong Kong) Yip Pui Yin	9	6	3	+3
(Hong Kong) Zhou Mi	4	1	3	–2
(India) Saina Nehwal	6	4	2	+2
(India) P. V. Sindhu	1	1	0	+1
(Japan) Minatsu Mitani	2	0	2	–2
(Malaysia) Wong Mew Choo	7	5	2	+3
(Netherlands) Mia Audina	1	1	0	+1
(South Korea) Bae Yeon-ju	2	1	1	0
(South Korea) Sung Ji-hyun	2	1	1	0
(Thailand) Porntip Buranaprasertsuk	3	2	1	+1
(Thailand) Ratchanok Intanon	2	1	1	0
