= Wang Yihan =

Chinese badminton player (born 1988)

Wang Yihan 王仪涵
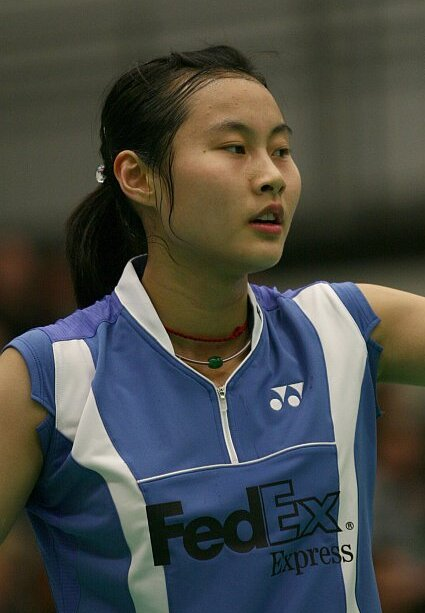
- Wang in 2008

Personal information
- Born: 18 January 1988 (age 38) Shanghai, China
- Height: 1.78 m (5 ft 10 in)
- Spouse: Gu Zhengyun (m. 2019)

Sport
- Country: China
- Sport: Badminton
- Handedness: Right
- Coached by: Zhang Ning

Women's singles
- Career record: 368 wins, 91 losses
- Highest ranking: 1 (29 October 2009)
- BWF profile
Medal record
Women's badminton
Representing China
Olympic Games
| Silver medal – second place | 2012 London | Women's singles |
World Championships
| Gold medal – first place | 2011 London | Women's singles |
World Cup
| Gold medal – first place | 2006 Yiyang | Women's singles |
Sudirman Cup
| Gold medal – first place | 2009 Guangzhou | Mixed team |
| Gold medal – first place | 2011 Qingdao | Mixed team |
| Gold medal – first place | 2013 Kuala Lumpur | Mixed team |
| Gold medal – first place | 2015 Dongguan | Mixed team |
Uber Cup
| Gold medal – first place | 2012 Wuhan | Women's team |
| Gold medal – first place | 2014 New Delhi | Women's team |
| Gold medal – first place | 2016 Kunshan | Women's team |
| Silver medal – second place | 2010 Kuala Lumpur | Women's team |
Asian Games
| Gold medal – first place | 2014 Incheon | Women's team |
| Gold medal – first place | 2014 Incheon | Women's singles |
Asian Championships
| Gold medal – first place | 2011 Chengdu | Women's singles |
| Gold medal – first place | 2013 Taipei | Women's singles |
| Gold medal – first place | 2016 Wuhan | Women's singles |
| Silver medal – second place | 2012 Qingdao | Women's singles |
| Bronze medal – third place | 2009 Suwon | Women's singles |
| Bronze medal – third place | 2015 Wuhan | Women's singles |
Summer Universiade
| Gold medal – first place | 2007 Bangkok | Women's singles |
| Silver medal – second place | 2007 Bangkok | Mixed team |
World Junior Championships
| Gold medal – first place | 2006 Incheon | Girls' singles |
| Gold medal – first place | 2004 Richmond | Mixed team |
| Silver medal – second place | 2006 Incheon | Mixed team |
Asian Junior Championships
| Gold medal – first place | 2006 Kuala Lumpur | Girls' singles |
| Gold medal – first place | 2005 Jakarta | Girls' team |
| Gold medal – first place | 2004 Hwacheon | Girls' team |
| Silver medal – second place | 2005 Jakarta | Girls' singles |
| Bronze medal – third place | 2006 Kuala Lumpur | Mixed team |
| Bronze medal – third place | 2004 Hwacheon | Girls' singles |

Wang Yihan
- Traditional Chinese: 王儀涵
- Simplified Chinese: 王仪涵
Transcriptions
Standard Mandarin
- Hanyu Pinyin: Wáng Yíhán

Wang Yihan (born 18 January 1988) is a retired Chinese professional badminton player and former women's singles world champion and Olympic silver medalist. Wang started her career with her coach Wang Pengren at only nine years of age. She was selected for the junior team in 2004, and after being promoted to the senior team in 2006, she began to shine in major tournaments. By October 2009 she was the top ranked Women's singles player in the world.

== Career ==
=== 2004–2006 ===
Yihan was the bronze medallist at the 2004 Asian Junior Championships. She was also a quarterfinalist in the same year's World Junior Championships where she lost to Korean Ha Jung-eun. In 2005, she won the silver medal in Asian Junior Championships where she lost to her teammate Wang Lin in the final. In 2006, she won both Asian Junior Championships and World Junior Championships with her win against Malaysian Lyddia Cheah and Indian Saina Nehwal respectively. She earned a spotlight in the World elite badminton where she won the 2006 Badminton World Cup, winning against reigning Olympic champion, Zhang Ning in the semifinal, and 2–times reigning world champion Xie Xingfang in the final; both wins in just 2 games.

=== 2007–2008 ===
In 2007, she won 3 titles. In the 2007 Summer Universiade, she beat Taipei's Cheng Shao-chieh to win the gold medal. She also won the Bitburger Open and Russian Open Grand Prix Gold that year. In 2008, she started the year by finishing runner-up at the German Open, losing to Jun Jae-youn. Yihan then won her first super-series title, the Japan Open by beating leading player from Hongkong, Zhou Mi, with 21–19, 17–21, 21–15 scores. However, she didn't qualify to participate in the 2008 Olympics, as her highest achieving teammates and senior players Xie Xingfang, Zhang Ning and Lu Lan had already confirmed their places from China.

=== 2009 ===
Yihan was at her prime in 2009, as she won the Yonex German Open competition against fellow countrywoman Zhu Lin, and just one week later, at the age of 21, the prestigious All-England Championships against Denmark's Tine Rasmussen. Yihan then went on to win the Wilson Swiss Open against compatriot Jiang Yanjiao. Yihan was the bronze medallist at the Asian Championships where she went down fighting against Olympic silver medallist Xie Xingfang in the semifinal. Having already won against both the Olympic champion and runner-up, Zhang Ning and Xie Xingfang, in past tournaments, she defeated the Olympic bronze medallist, Indonesia's Maria Kristin Yulianti in the group stage of the 2009 Sudirman Cup with a 16–21, 21–5, 21–10 performance. Yihan, seeded 4th at the World Championships, was upset by 11th seed, Germany's Juliane Schenk in the 2nd round in straight games. Yihan won the Macau Open in August 2009 when she again beat Jiang Yanjiao. In September 2009, Yihan defended her YONEX Japan Open title by crushing Wang Xin (21–8, 21–9) in just 29 minutes. She lost the final of 2009 against Tine Rasmussen in Denmark Super Series in a hard-fought match. Although she lost the final, she reached the top position in the Women's singles rankings. Wang then won the 2009 French Super Series in November when she emphatically beat top seed, and defending champion, Wang Lin (21–9, 21–12). Wang won her second title in a row, and her fifth BWF Super Series tournament of the year, when she beat Jiang Yanjiao again, this time in the Yonex Sunrise Hong Kong Open. This was also her seventh title overall in 2009.

=== 2010 ===
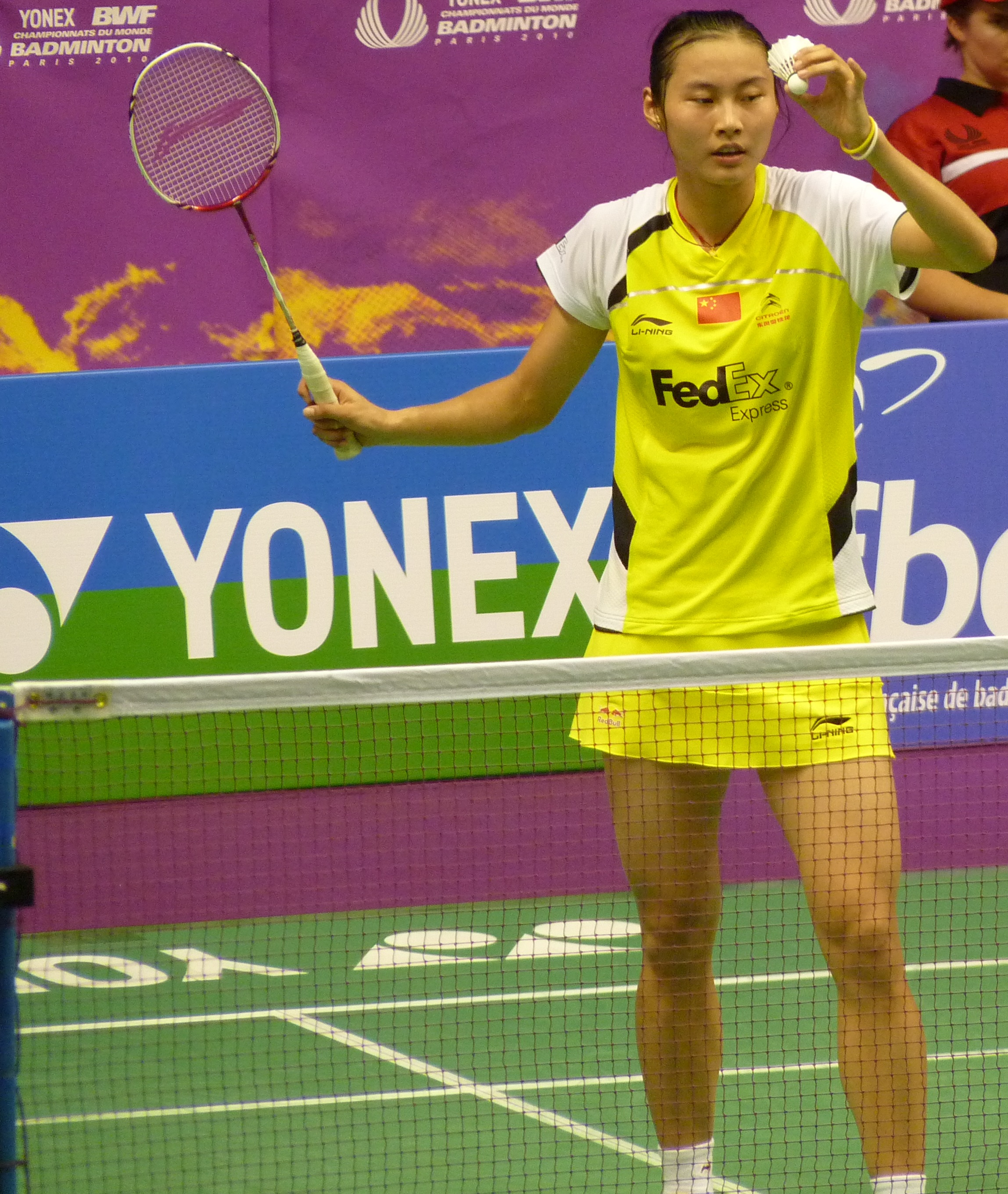
Wang Yihan at 2010 BWF World Championships

Yihan was looking to defend her All England Open title but was beaten by Tine Rasmussen in a repeat final of the previous year's clash, in a very close match or 3 games. Just like the previous year, Yihan again lost early in the BWF World Championships, losing to Japanese Eriko Hirose in 2nd round. She won her first title of the year by beating Liu Xin in the final of 2010 Denmark Super Series. She then won 2nd consecutive title by winning the 2010 French Super Series event, against compatriot, Li Xuerui. In the 2010 BWF Super Series Finals, Yihan was seeded 2nd. She won all her group stage encounters, with win against Petya Nedelcheva, Tine Baun and Yip Pui Yin. But, in the semifinal, she got a surprising defeat against Korean player Bae Yeon-ju, in 3 contested games stretching over an hour.

=== 2011 ===
In 2011, she reached the final of the 2011 Malaysia Super Series but lost to Wang Shixian. The following in the Korean Open final, she turned the tables and defeated Shixian. She won the gold medal in the 2011 Badminton Asia Championships by winning against Lu Lan. Yihan made a superb comeback against Saina Nehwal in the 2011 Indonesia Super Series Premier final, when she edged through a close 2nd game to win it 12–21, 23–21, 21–14. Continuing in her best form, she defeated Gu Juan, Ratchanok Intanon, Pi Hongyan & Wang Xin to reach the final of BWF World Championships. She won the gold medal, beating Cheng Shao-chieh with a big win and continued the Chinese supremacy in the Women's single category. A point to note is, the Chinese women's single players had swept all the titles since 2000. She then won the Japan open title for the 3rd consecutive time, beating Juliane Schenk. She lost to her teammate Wang Xin for the first time, in the 2011 Denmark Super Series Premier final failing to defend her title. In the 2011 China Open final, her opponent, Wang Xin, retired when Yihan was 18–12 up in the 1st game, thus Yihan won the title. With a successful year yet again, she was looking for her first Year end title. In the 2011 BWF Super Series Finals, she lost to Sung Ji-hyun but won other 2 matches against Juliane Schenk & Tine Baun, qualifying for the semifinal. She again won over Wang Xin, and set her match against India's Saina Nehwal. She won 18–21, 21–13, 21–13 and won the title.

=== 2012 ===
Yihan won the Malaysia Super Series title with a comprehensive win over Wang Xin. In her 3rd All England Open final, she lost to new beaming Chinese star Li Xuerui in just 2 games. She failed to defend her Asian title with a defeat from the hands of Li Xuerui in the final, settling for the silver medal. Going into the 2012 London Olympics as a top seed, she was an overwhelming favorite to win the title. In the 2nd round, she beat Bae Yeon-ju in 3 games, Cheng Shao-chieh (2–0) in the quarter-finals and Saina Nehwal in the semifinals and in 2 games. Her opposition in the final was once again Li Xuerui. Li took opening game 21–15 but Yihan's hardwork stretched the match to the 3rd game and won 23–21 in second. Li again proved fatal for her and won the 3rd game 21–17, and won the Olympic title, leaving Yihan in despair. Consequently settling for yet another silver medal. Wang Yihan won the 2012 China Masters Super Series by beating a familiar rival Jiang Yanjiao. Her losing streak against Li Xuerui continued, this time in the final of the 2012 Hong Kong Super Series, where Wang retired in the middle of the 2nd game while trailing 12–21, 3–11. Being injured, she didn't contest the master finals of the year end, where she was the champion the previous year.

=== 2013 ===
In 2013, she regained German Open title by winning against Juliane Schenk. She became the Asian champion for the 2nd time, by mastering Li Xuerui, recovering from her after 5 consecutive losses in the previous year. She again defeated Li Xuerui, this time in the final of the 2013 Singapore Super Series. She was the defending champion of the World Championships, but lost in 2nd round to young Indian teenager, P. V. Sindhu. She won the 2013 Denmark Super Series Premier in a very difficult encounter of 3 games, standing victorious over Sung Ji-hyun. Successively, she won another title at the Hong Kong Open by beating Wang Shixian. She did qualify for the year and finals as no. 8 but was behind her compatriots Wang Shixian and Li Xuerui in qualifying rankings. Game rule say a maximum of 2 players only are allowed from one nation. So she was exempted from taking part in the competition.

=== 2014 ===
In 2014, she won another series of titles, the first being the 2014 Korea Open Super Series, then the 2014 Swiss Open Grand Prix Gold, and also defending her Singapore title. After her Triumph in World Championships back in 2011, she was not able to get another medal in this prestigious tournament. This continued when she surrendered against eventual winner Carolina Marín of Spain, in 2nd round. She then stamped her class by winning gold in the 2014 Asian Games with a victory over her nemesis Li Xuerui 11–21, 21–17, 21–7. She was beaten in the Denmark Open final by Li Xuerui. She retired hurt when competing in 2nd group match of 2014 BWF Super Series Finals and was ousted from the tournament.

=== 2015 ===
In 2015, she won bronze medal in the 2015 Badminton Asia Championships. Her title victory at the 2015 Chinese Taipei Open Grand Prix Gold stunned everybody, as she recorded a very disastrous win over Li Xuerui in just 29 minutes of play, conceding less than 20 points in the match. This victory showed she was still in the race to contest the next year's Olympics as her recent past performances were not satisfactory. She finished the quarterfinalist in the World Championships after a gruelling contest with Saina Nehwal. She then lost in the Korean open final, as Sung Ji-hyun registered an upsetting victory over Wang Yihan. Coming into the Dubai world Superseries Finals, she trailblazed her way to the finals, in which she earlier defeated Ratchanok Intanon in a semifinal which brought her head to head against Intanon leading 12–0. In the final though, she appeared out of sorts against Nozomi Okuhara in the decisive moments of the match, as her tireless opponent's long rallying style drained out Wang's physical strength and she lost in 2 tight games.

=== 2016 ===
2016 saw Wang Yihan returning to the top 3 in the World rankings, with her consistent display in the tournaments. She was the runner up in the 2016 Swiss Open Grand Prix Gold event, losing to young Chinese He Bingjiao in the final. She won the Asian Championship title for the 3rd time, beating out Li Xuerui. She had defeated Li in 2013. She then sailed through to the finals of 2016 Indonesia Super Series Premier, which included her 2nd consecutive victory over 2-time reigning World Champion, Carolina Marín in the semifinal. However she lost to Tai Tzu-ying in final the showdown. With her impressive display, Chinese coaches selected her as a 2nd candidate from China to contest the upcoming Olympic games. In the final moment, her teammate Shixian was ruled out and she was sent to Rio with already qualified Li Xuerui (defending Olympic champion). Her campaign ended in disappointment, even though she was a 2nd seed, she lost to surprise quarterfinalist P. V. Sindhu, the 9th seed with 2 tough games. Wang Yihan then announced her retirement from professional badminton. Wang had a very illustrious career, winning thirty singles titles, including four Super Series Premier titles, fifteen Super Series titles, and one Super Series Finals title.

== Background ==
Wang is an only child. Wang credited her Mother for her badminton journey. Wang's mother used to play badminton with her just outside their home. Seeing her as an energetic child, Wang's parents decided to send her to a badminton academy which eventually led to Wang's successful career. Prior to badminton, she was also recommended by her teachers to play volleyball due to her height. Wang is a native Shanghainese and speaks fluent Shanghainese.

== Personal life ==
When asked about her relationship status, Wang stated that she is single and is currently focusing on her career. Wang is good friends with teammates such as Li Xuerui, Tian Qing, Fu Haifeng, Lin Dan among others.

On 26 October 2019, Wang announced her marriage to Gu Zhengyun, a former member of the Shanghai badminton team.

== Achievements ==
=== Olympic Games ===
Women's singles
| Year | Venue | Opponent | Score | Result |
|---|---|---|---|---|
| 2012 | Wembley Arena, London, Great Britain | (China) Li Xuerui | 15–21, 23–21, 17–21 | Silver |

=== World Championships ===
Women's singles
| Year | Venue | Opponent | Score | Result |
|---|---|---|---|---|
| 2011 | Wembley Arena, London, England | (Chinese Taipei) Cheng Shao-chieh | 21–15, 21–10 | Gold |

=== World Cup ===
Women's singles
| Year | Venue | Opponent | Score | Result |
|---|---|---|---|---|
| 2006 | Olympic Park, Yiyang, China | (China) Xie Xingfang | 21–18, 21–19 | Gold |

=== Asian Games ===
Women's singles
| Year | Venue | Opponent | Score | Result |
|---|---|---|---|---|
| 2014 | Gyeyang Gymnasium, Incheon, South Korea | (China) Li Xuerui | 11–21, 21–17, 21–7 | Gold |

=== Asian Championships ===
Women's singles
| Year | Venue | Opponent | Score | Result |
|---|---|---|---|---|
| 2009 | Suwon Indoor Stadium, Suwon, South Korea | (China) Xie Xingfang | 18–21, 21–19, 12–21 | Bronze |
| 2011 | Sichuan Gymnasium, Chengdu, China | (China) Lu Lan | 21–15, 23–21 | Gold |
| 2012 | Qingdao Sports Centre Conson Stadium, Qingdao, China | (China) Li Xuerui | 16–21, 21–16, 9–21 | Silver |
| 2013 | Taipei Arena, Taipei, Taiwan | (China) Li Xuerui | 21–15, 21–13 | Gold |
| 2015 | Wuhan Sports Center Gymnasium, Wuhan, China | (China) Li Xuerui | 22–20, 22–24, 20–22 | Bronze |
| 2016 | Wuhan Sports Center Gymnasium, Wuhan, China | (China) Li Xuerui | 21–14, 13–21, 21–16 | Gold |

=== Summer Universiade ===
Women's singles
| Year | Venue | Opponent | Score | Result |
|---|---|---|---|---|
| 2007 | Thammasat University, Bangkok, Thailand | (Chinese Taipei) Cheng Shao-chieh | 21–12, 21–17 | Gold |

=== World Junior Championships ===
Girls' singles
| Year | Venue | Opponent | Score | Result |
|---|---|---|---|---|
| 2006 | Samsan World Gymnasium, Incheon, South Korea | (India) Saina Nehwal | 21–13, 21–9 | Gold |

=== Asian Junior Championships ===
Girls' singles
| Year | Venue | Opponent | Score | Result |
|---|---|---|---|---|
| 2004 | Hwacheon Indoor Stadium, Hwacheon, South Korea | (China) Jiang Yanjiao | 6–11, 1–11 | Bronze |
| 2005 | Tennis Indoor Senayan, Jakarta, Indonesia | (China) Wang Lin | 4–11, 9–11 | Silver |
| 2006 | Kuala Lumpur Badminton Stadium, Kuala Lumpur, Malaysia | (Malaysia) Lyddia Cheah | 21–16, 21–18 | Gold |

=== BWF Superseries 20 Titles 9 Runner Up ===
The BWF Superseries, which was launched on 14 December 2006 and implemented in 2007, is a series of elite badminton tournaments, sanctioned by the Badminton World Federation (BWF). BWF Superseries levels are Superseries and Superseries Premier. A season of Superseries consists of twelve tournaments around the world that have been introduced since 2011. Successful players are invited to the Superseries Finals, which are held at the end of each year.

| Year | Tournament | Opponent | Score | Result |
|---|---|---|---|---|
| 2008 | Japan Open | (Hong Kong) Zhou Mi | 21–19, 17–21, 21–15 | (gold) Winner |
| 2009 | All England Open | (Denmark) Tine Rasmussen | 21–19, 21–23, 21–11 | (gold) Winner |
| 2009 | Swiss Open | (China) Jiang Yanjiao | 21–17, 17–21, 21–13 | (gold) Winner |
| 2009 | Japan Open | (China) Wang Xin | 21–8, 21–9 | (gold) Winner |
| 2009 | Denmark Open | (Denmark) Tine Rasmussen | 18–21, 21–19, 14–21 | (silver) Runner-up |
| 2009 | French Open | (China) Wang Lin | 21–9, 21–12 | (gold) Winner |
| 2009 | Hong Kong Open | (China) Jiang Yanjiao | 21–13, 21–15 | (gold) Winner |
| 2010 | All England Open | (Denmark) Tine Rasmussen | 14–21, 21–18, 19–21 | (silver) Runner-up |
| 2010 | Denmark Open | (China) Liu Xin | 21–14, 21–12 | (gold) Winner |
| 2010 | French Open | (China) Li Xuerui | 21–13, 21–9 | (gold) Winner |
| 2011 | Malaysia Open | (China) Wang Shixian | 18–21, 14–21 | (silver) Runner-up |
| 2011 | Korea Open | (China) Wang Shixian | 21–14, 21–18 | (gold) Winner |
| 2011 | Indonesia Open | (India) Saina Nehwal | 12–21, 23–21, 21–14 | (gold) Winner |
| 2011 | Japan Open | (Germany) Juliane Schenk | 21–16, 21–14 | (gold) Winner |
| 2011 | Denmark Open | (China) Wang Xin | 14–21, 21–23 | (silver) Runner-up |
| 2011 | China Open | (China) Wang Xin | 18–12^{r} | (gold) Winner |
| 2011 | BWF Super Series Finals | (India) Saina Nehwal | 18–21, 21–13, 21–13 | (gold) Winner |
| 2012 | Malaysia Open | (China) Wang Xin | 21–19, 21–11 | (gold) Winner |
| 2012 | All England Open | (China) Li Xuerui | 13–21, 19–21 | (silver) Runner-up |
| 2012 | China Masters | (China) Jiang Yanjiao | 21–18, 21–14 | (gold) Winner |
| 2012 | Hong Kong Open | (China) Li Xuerui | 12–21, 3^{r}–11 | (silver) Runner-up |
| 2013 | Singapore Open | (China) Li Xuerui | 21–18, 21–12 | (gold) Winner |
| 2013 | Denmark Open | (South Korea) Sung Ji-hyun | 16–21, 21–18, 22–20 | (gold) Winner |
| 2013 | Hong Kong Open | (China) Wang Shixian | 21–13, 16–21, 21–15 | (gold) Winner |
| 2014 | Korea Open | (Thailand) Ratchanok Intanon | 21–13, 21–19 | (gold) Winner |
| 2014 | Singapore Open | (China) Li Xuerui | 21–11, 21–19 | (gold) Winner |
| 2014 | Denmark Open | (China) Li Xuerui | 17–21, 20–22 | (silver) Runner-up |
| 2015 | Korea Open | (South Korea) Sung Ji-hyun | 14–21, 21–17, 18–21 | (silver) Runner-up |
| 2015 | BWF Super Series Finals | Nozomi Okuhara | 20-22, 18-21 | 2 Runner-up |
| 2016 | Indonesia Open | (Chinese Taipei) Tai Tzu-ying | 17–21, 8–21 | (silver) Runner-up |

BWF Super Series Finals tournament
BWF Super Series Premier tournament
BWF Super Series tournament

=== BWF Grand Prix ===
The BWF Grand Prix has two levels, the BWF Grand Prix and Grand Prix Gold. It is a series of badminton tournaments sanctioned by the Badminton World Federation (BWF) since 2007.

Women's singles
| Year | Tournament | Opponent | Score | Result |
|---|---|---|---|---|
| 2007 | Bitburger Open | (Germany) Juliane Schenk | 16–21, 21–10, 21–17 | (gold) Winner |
| 2007 | Russian Open | (Germany) Xu Huaiwen | 21–17, 16–21, 21–19 | (gold) Winner |
| 2008 | German Open | (South Korea) Jun Jae-youn | 23–25, 10–21 | (silver) Runner-up |
| 2009 | German Open | (China) Zhu Lin | 20–22, 21–13, 21–11 | (gold) Winner |
| 2009 | Macau Open | (China) Jiang Yanjiao | 16–21, 22–20, 21–12 | (gold) Winner |
| 2013 | German Open | (Germany) Juliane Schenk | 21–14, 21–13 | (gold) Winner |
| 2014 | Swiss Open | (China) Sun Yu | 21–23, 21–9, 21–11 | (gold) Winner |
| 2015 | Chinese Taipei Open | (China) Li Xuerui | 21–10, 21–9 | (gold) Winner |
| 2016 | Swiss Open | (China) He Bingjiao | 16–21, 10–21 | (silver) Runner-up |

BWF Grand Prix Gold tournament
BWF Grand Prix tournament

== Performance timeline ==
=== Singles performance timeline ===
Key

| W | Won | F | Finalist | SF | Semi-finalist |
| QF | Quarter-finalist | #R | Rounds 4, 3, 2, 1 | RR | Round-robin stage |
| Q# | Qualification round | A | Absent | w/d | Withdrew |
| G | Gold | S | Silver | B | Bronze |
| NH | Not held | N/A | Not applicable | DNQ | Did not qualify |

To avoid confusion and double counting, information in this table is updated only once a tournament or the player's participation in the tournament has concluded. This table is current through 2016 All England Super Series Premier.

| Tournament | 2004 | 2005 | 2006 | 2007 | 2008 | 2009 | 2010 | 2011 | 2012 | 2013 | 2014 | 2015 | 2016 | SR | W–L | Win % |
|---|---|---|---|---|---|---|---|---|---|---|---|---|---|---|---|---|
| Summer Olympics | A | not held | | | A | not held | | | S 4–1 | not held | | | QF; 2–1 | 0 / 2 | 6–2 | 75% |
| World Championships | NH | absent | | | NH | 3R; 1–1 | 3R; 1–1 | G 5–0 | NH | 3R; 1–1 | 3R; 1–1 | QF; 2–1 | NH | 1 / 6 | 11–5 | 69% |
| World Cup | NH | A | G 4–0 | not held | | | | | | | | | | 1 / 1 | 4–0 | 100% |
| World Superseries Finals | not held | | | | absent | | SF; 3–1 | W 4–1 | absent | | RR; 0–3 | F 3–2 | A | 1 / 4 | 10–7 | 58% |
| Asian Championships | absent | | | | | SF-B; 3–1 | A | G 5–0 | S 4–1 | G 5–0 | A | SF-B; 3–1 | G 5–0 | 3 / 6 | 25–3 | 89% |
| Asian Games | not held | | A | not held | | | A | not held | | | G 5–0 | not held | | 1 / 1 | 5–0 | 100% |
| East Asian Games | not held | | | | | A | not held | | | A | not held | | | 0 / 0 | | |
Team Competitions
| Uber Cup | A | NH | A | NH | A | NH | S 4–1 | NH | G 5–0 | NH | G 3–0 | NH | G 3–0 | 3 / 4 | 15–1 | 94% |
| Sudirman Cup | NH | A | NH | A | NH | G 2–0 | NH | A | NH | G 1–0 | NH | G 1–0 | NH | 3 / 3 | 4–0 | 100% |
| Asian Games | not held | | A | not held | | | A | not held | | | G 0–0 | not held | | 1 / 1 | 0–0 | N/A |
| East Asian Games | not held | | | | | A | not held | | | A | not held | | | 0 / 0 | | |
BWF World Superseries Premier
| All England Open | absent | | | | 2R; 1–1 | W 5–0 | F 4–1 | A | F 4–1 | 1R; 0–1 | SF; 3–1 | QF; 2–1 | QF; 2–1 | 1 / 8 | 21–7 | 75% |
| Malaysia Open | absent | | | | | | SF; 3–1 | F 4–1 | W 5–0 | A | QF; 2–1 | QF; 2–1 | SF; 3–1 | 1 / 6 | 19–5 | 79% |
| Indonesia Open | absent | | | | | QF; 2–1 | A | W 5–0 | SF; 3–1 | 1R; 0–1 | 2R; 1–1 | SF; 3–1 | F 4–1 | 1 / 7 | 18–6 | 75% |
| Denmark Open | absent | | | | 1R; 0–1 | F 4–1 | W 5–0 | F 4–1 | SF; 3–1 | W 5–0 | F 4–1 | QF; 2–1 | A | 2 / 8 | 27–6 | 82% |
| China Open | 2R; 3–1 | SF; 3–1 | A | 1R; 2–1 | 1R; 0–1 | 2R; 1–1 | SF; 3–1 | W 5–0 | QF; 2–1 | QF; 2–1 | QF; 2–1 | SF; 3–1 | A | 1 / 11 | 26–10 | 72% |
BWF World Superseries
| India Open | not held | | | | absent | | | | | | SF; 3–1 | absent | | 0 / 1 | 3–1 | 75% |
| Singapore Open | absent | | | | | QF; 2–1 | A | QF; 2–1 | A | W 5–0 | W 5–0 | SF; 3–1 | 2R; 1–1 | 2 / 6 | 17–4 | 81% |
| Australian Open | absent | | | | | | | | | | | QF; 2–1 | SF; 3–1 | 0 / 2 | 5–2 | 71% |
| Japan Open | absent | | | Q2; 1–1 | W 5–0 | W 5–0 | 2R; 1–1 | W 5–0 | A | SF; 3–1 | 2R; 1–1 | QF; 2–1 | A | 3 / 8 | 23–5 | 82% |
| Korea Open | absent | | | | | | | W 5–0 | SF; 3–1 | 1R; 0–1 | W 5–0 | F 4–1 | A | 2 / 5 | 17–3 | 85% |
| French Open | absent | | NH | A | QF; 2–1 | W 5–0 | W 5–0 | QF; 2–1 | absent | | SF; 3–1 | 2R; 1–1 | A | 2 / 6 | 18–4 | 82% |
| Hong Kong Open | absent | | | | 1R; 0–1 | W 5–0 | A | SF; 3–1 | F 4–1 | W 5–0 | 2R; 1–1 | SF; 3–1 | A | 2 / 7 | 21–5 | 81% |
BWF Grand Prix Gold and Grand Prix
| German Open | absent | | | 1R; 2–1 | F 4–1 | W 5–0 | absent | | | W 5–0 | absent | | | 2 / 4 | 16–2 | 89% |
| Swiss Open | absent | | | | 2R; 1–1 | W 5–0 | 2R; 1–1 | A | 2R; 1–1 | A | W 5–0 | QF; 2–1 | F 4–1 | 2 / 7 | 19–5 | 79% |
| China Masters | A | QF; 2–1 | 2R; 1–1 | QF; 3–1 | SF; 3–1 | QF; 2–1 | SF; 3–1 | SF; 3–1 | W 4–0 | 1R; 0–1 | absent | | | 1 / 9 | 21–8 | 72% |
| Chinese Taipei Open | absent | | | | | | | | | | | W 5–0 | A | 1 / 1 | 5–0 | 100% |
| Vietnam Open | not held | | A | SF; 3–1 | absent | | | | | | | | | 0 / 1 | 3–1 | 75% |
| Thailand Open | A | Q1; 0–1 | absent | | | | NH | absent | | | NH | absent | | 0 / 1 | 0–1 | 0% |
| Russian Open | absent | | NH | W 5–0 | absent | | | | | | | | | 1 / 1 | 5–0 | 100% |
| Bitburger Open | absent | | | W 5–0 | absent | | | | | | | | | 1 / 1 | 5–0 | 100% |
| Macau Open | not held | | absent | | | W 5–0 | absent | | | | | | | 1 / 1 | 5–0 | 100% |
| Philippines Open | not held | | A | QF; 5–1 | NH | A | not held | | | | | | | 0 / 1 | 5–1 | 83% |
Career Statistics
| | 2004 | 2005 | 2006 | 2007 | 2008 | 2009 | 2010 | 2011 | 2012 | 2013 | 2014 | 2015 | 2016 | | | |
| Tournaments played | 1 | 3 | 2 | 8 | 9 | 15 | 11 | 13 | 12 | 13 | 17 | 17 | 9 | 130 | | |
| Titles | 0 | 0 | 1 | 2 | 1 | 8 | 2 | 7 | 3 | 6 | 6 | 2 | 2 | 40 | | |
| Finals Reached | 0 | 0 | 1 | 2 | 2 | 9 | 4 | 9 | 7 | 6 | 7 | 4 | 3 | 54 | | |
| Overall win–loss | 3–1 | 5–3 | 5–1 | 26–6 | 16–8 | 52–7 | 33–9 | 52–7 | 42–9 | 32–7 | 44–13 | 42–17 | 27-7 | 379–95 | | |
| Win Percentage | 75% | 63% | 83% | 81% | 67% | 88% | 79% | 88% | 82% | 82% | 77% | 71% | 79% | 79.96% | | |
| Year End Ranking | | | | | 18 | 1 | 3 | 1 | 2 | 4 | 3 | 4 | | | | |

== Record against selected opponents ==
Record against year-end Finals finalists, World Championships semi-finalists, and Olympic quarter-finalists.

| Players | Matches | Results | | Difference |
| Players | Matches | Won | Lost | Difference |
|---|---|---|---|---|
| (Bulgaria) Petya Nedelcheva | 6 | 6 | 0 | +6 |
| (China) He Bingjiao | 2 | 1 | 1 | 0 |
| (China) Li Xuerui | 18 | 10 | 8 | +2 |
| (China) Lu Lan | 9 | 5 | 4 | +1 |
| (China) Wang Lin | 3 | 2 | 1 | +1 |
| (China) Wang Shixian | 18 | 13 | 5 | +8 |
| (China) Wang Xin | 11 | 9 | 2 | +7 |
| (China) Xie Xingfang | 5 | 2 | 3 | –1 |
| (China) Zhang Ning | 4 | 1 | 3 | –2 |
| (China) Zhu Lin | 1 | 1 | 0 | +1 |
| (Chinese Taipei) Cheng Shao-chieh | 5 | 5 | 0 | +5 |
| (Chinese Taipei) Tai Tzu-ying | 9 | 4 | 5 | –1 |
| (Denmark) Tine Baun | 13 | 8 | 5 | +3 |
| (France) Pi Hongyan | 4 | 3 | 1 | +2 |
| (Germany) Juliane Schenk | 10 | 8 | 2 | +6 |
| (Hong Kong) Wang Chen | 4 | 3 | 1 | +2 |

| Players | Matches | Results | | Difference |
| Players | Matches | Won | Lost | Difference |
|---|---|---|---|---|
| (Hong Kong) Yip Pui Yin | 9 | 6 | 3 | +3 |
| (Hong Kong) Zhou Mi | 4 | 4 | 0 | +4 |
| (India) Saina Nehwal | 17 | 12 | 5 | +7 |
| (India) P. V. Sindhu | 7 | 4 | 3 | +1 |
| (Indonesia) Lindaweni Fanetri | 5 | 4 | 1 | +3 |
| (Indonesia) Maria Kristin Yulianti | 1 | 1 | 0 | +1 |
| (Japan) Minatsu Mitani | 7 | 6 | 1 | +5 |
| (Japan) Nozomi Okuhara | 6 | 3 | 3 | 0 |
| (Japan) Akane Yamaguchi | 3 | 2 | 1 | +1 |
| (Malaysia) Wong Mew Choo | 1 | 0 | 1 | –1 |
| (South Korea) Bae Yeon-ju | 15 | 11 | 4 | +7 |
| (South Korea) Sung Ji-hyun | 15 | 12 | 3 | +9 |
| (Spain) Carolina Marín | 7 | 4 | 3 | +1 |
| (Thailand) Porntip Buranaprasertsuk | 7 | 5 | 2 | +3 |
| (Thailand) Ratchanok Intanon | 13 | 12 | 1 | +11 |
