= 2014 Uber Cup group stage =

This article lists the complete results of the group stage of the 2014 Uber Cup in New Delhi, India.

== Group W ==
Team	Pts	Pld	W	L	MF	MA
China	6	3	3	0	15	0
England	4	3	2	1	7	8
Chinese Taipei	2	3	1	2	6	9
Russia	0	3	0	3	2	13

=== China vs Russia ===
China
5
Siri Fort Indoor Stadium Court 2
18 May 2014

Russia
0

			1	2	3
1	(China) (Russia)	Li Xuerui; Natalia Perminova	21; 17	21; 10
2	(China) (Russia)	Wang Yihan; Anastasia Chervaykova	21; 13	21; 13
3	(China) (Russia)	Sun Yu; Evgeniya Kosetskaya	21; 11	21; 9
4	(China) (Russia)	Bao Yixin / Tang Jinhua; Anastasia Chervaykova / Ksenia Polikarpova	21; 6	21; 7
5	(China) (Russia)	Tian Qing / Zhao Yunlei; Ekaterina Bolotova / Evgeniya Kosetskaya	21; 8	21; 11

=== Chinese Taipei vs England ===
Chinese Taipei
2
Siri Fort Indoor Stadium Court 4
18 May 2014

England
3

			1	2	3
1	(Chinese Taipei) (England)	Pai Hsiao-ma; Fontaine Mica Chapman	20; 22	9; 21
2	(Chinese Taipei) (England)	Cheng Wen-hsing / Hsieh Pei-chen; Gabby Adcock / Lauren Smith	21; 15	15; 21	13; 21
3	(Chinese Taipei) (England)	Lee Chia-hsin; Sarah Walker	21; 15	16; 21	21; 13
4	(Chinese Taipei) (England)	Kuo Yu-wen / Wang Pei-rong; Heather Olver / Kate Robertshaw	13; 21	13; 21
5	(Chinese Taipei) (England)	Pai Yu-po; Nicola Cerfontyne	23; 21	21; 13

=== China vs England ===
China
5
Siri Fort Indoor Stadium Court 2
19 May 2014

England
0

			1	2	3
1	(China) (England)	Li Xuerui; Fontaine Mica Chapman	21; 13	21; 13
2	(China) (England)	Bao Yixin / Tang Jinhua; Gabby Adcock / Lauren Smith	21; 8	21; 17
3	(China) (England)	Wang Shixian; Sarah Walker	21; 13	21; 8
4	(China) (England)	Wang Xiaoli / Zhao Yunlei; Heather Olver / Kate Robertshaw	21; 10	21; 13
5	(China) (England)	Wang Yihan; Panuga Riou	21; 12	21; 16

=== Chinese Taipei vs Russia ===
Chinese Taipei
4
Siri Fort Indoor Stadium Court 4
19 May 2014

Russia
1

			1	2	3
1	(Chinese Taipei) (Russia)	Tai Tzu-ying; Natalia Perminova	21; 13	21; 17
2	(Chinese Taipei) (Russia)	Lee Chia-hsin; Ksenia Polikarpova	21; 19	21; 19
3	(Chinese Taipei) (Russia)	Pai Yu-po; Anastasia Chervaykova	20; 22	21; 5	21; 13
4	(Chinese Taipei) (Russia)	Kuo Yu-wen / Wang Pei-rong; Ekaterina Bolotova / Evgeniya Kosetskaya	23; 21	17; 21	12; 21
5	(Chinese Taipei) (Russia)	Cheng Wen-hsing / Hsieh Pei-chen; Anastasia Chervaykova / Ksenia Polikarpova	15; 21	21; 9	21; 10

=== China vs Chinese Taipei ===
China
5
Siri Fort Indoor Stadium Court 2
21 May 2014

Chinese Taipei
0

			1	2	3
1	(China) (Chinese Taipei)	Li Xuerui; Tai Tzu-ying	21; 16	21; 12
2	(China) (Chinese Taipei)	Bao Yixin / Tang Jinhua; Cheng Wen-hsing / Hsieh Pei-chen	21; 10	21; 16
3	(China) (Chinese Taipei)	Wang Shixian; Lee Chia-hsin	21; 8	21; 10
4	(China) (Chinese Taipei)	Wang Xiaoli / Zhao Yunlei; Kuo Yu-wen / Wang Pei-rong	21; 9	21; 7
5	(China) (Chinese Taipei)	Wang Yihan; Pai Yu-po	18; 21	21; 17	21; 11

=== England vs Russia ===
England
4
Siri Fort Indoor Stadium Court 4
21 May 2014

Russia
1

			1	2	3
1	(England) (Russia)	Fontaine Mica Chapman; Natalia Perminova	21; 13	21; 14
2	(England) (Russia)	Sarah Walker; Ksenia Polikarpova	18; 21	11; 21
3	(England) (Russia)	Panuga Riou; Anastasia Chervaykova	21; 15	25; 23
4	(England) (Russia)	Gabby Adcock / Lauren Smith; Evgeniya Kosetskaya / Ksenia Polikarpova	21; 19	14; 21	21; 16
5	(England) (Russia)	Heather Olver / Kate Robertshaw; Anastasia Chervaykova / Ekaterina Bolotova	21; 15	19; 21	23; 21

== Group X ==
Team	Pts	Pld	W	L	MF	MA
South Korea	6	3	3	0	14	1
Indonesia	4	3	2	1	10	5
Singapore	2	3	1	2	6	9
Australia	0	3	0	3	0	15

=== Indonesia vs Australia ===
Indonesia
5
Siri Fort Indoor Stadium Court 2
18 May 2014

Australia
0

			1	2	3
1	(Indonesia) (Australia)	Lindaweni Fanetri; Tara Pilven	21; 16	21; 11
2	(Indonesia) (Australia)	Pia Zebadiah Bernadet / Rizki Amelia Pradipta; Tang Hetian / Renuga Veeran	21; 15	17; 21	21; 8
3	(Indonesia) (Australia)	Bellaetrix Manuputty; Verdet Kessler	21; 12	21; 12
4	(Indonesia) (Australia)	Adriyanti Firdasari; Joy Lai	21; 10	21; 12
5	(Indonesia) (Australia)	Suci Rizky Andini / Tiara Rosalia Nuraidah; Jacqueline Guan / Verdet Kessler	21; 10	21; 9

=== Korea vs Singapore ===
South Korea
5
Siri Fort Indoor Stadium Court 4
18 May 2014

Singapore
0

			1	2	3
1	(South Korea) (Singapore)	Sung Ji-hyun; Chen Jiayuan	21; 16	15; 21	21; 18
2	(South Korea) (Singapore)	Bae Youn-joo; Liang Xiaoyu	21; 8	21; 16
3	(South Korea) (Singapore)	Kim Hyo-min; Fu Mingtian	13; 21	21; 19	21; 16
4	(South Korea) (Singapore)	Jang Ye-na / Kim So-young; Shinta Mulia Sari / Yao Lei	21; 16	21; 13
5	(South Korea) (Singapore)	Jung Kyung-eun / Kim Ha-na; Fu Mingtian / Vanessa Neo	21; 15	20; 22	21; 16

=== Indonesia vs Singapore ===
Indonesia
4
Siri Fort Indoor Stadium Court 2
20 May 2014

Singapore
1

			1	2	3
1	(Indonesia) (Singapore)	Lindaweni Fanetri; Chen Jiayuan	21; 15	21; 15
2	(Indonesia) (Singapore)	Suci Rizky Andini / Tiara Rosalia Nuraidah; Fu Mingtian / Vanessa Neo	21; 14	21; 15
3	(Indonesia) (Singapore)	Bellaetrix Manuputty; Liang Xiaoyu	21; 14	17; 21	14; 21
4	(Indonesia) (Singapore)	Nitya Krishinda Maheswari / Greysia Polii; Shinta Mulia Sari / Yao Lei	21; 11	21; 8
5	(Indonesia) (Singapore)	Maria Febe Kusumastuti; Fu Mingtian	21; 15	21; 10

=== Korea vs Australia ===
South Korea
5
Siri Fort Indoor Stadium Court 4
20 May 2014

Australia
0

			1	2	3
1	(South Korea) (Australia)	Sung Ji-hyun; Tara Pilven	21; 3	21; 8
2	(South Korea) (Australia)	Jang Ye-na / Kim So-young; Tang Hetian / Renuga Veeran	21; 8	20; 22	21; 15
3	(South Korea) (Australia)	Bae Youn-joo; Verdet Kessler	21; 4	21; 12
4	(South Korea) (Australia)	Ko A-ra / Yoo Hae-won; Jacqueline Guan / Gronya Somerville	21; 4	21; 6
5	(South Korea) (Australia)	Lee Min-ji; Joy Lai	21; 8	21; 3

=== Korea vs Indonesia ===
South Korea
4
Siri Fort Indoor Stadium Court 2
21 May 2014

Indonesia
1

			1	2	3
1	(South Korea) (Indonesia)	Sung Ji-hyun; Lindaweni Fanetri	21; 12	21; 18
2	(South Korea) (Indonesia)	Jang Ye-na / Kim So-young; Nitya Krishinda Maheswari / Greysia Polii	12; 21	21; 18	21; 18
3	(South Korea) (Indonesia)	Bae Youn-joo; Maria Febe Kusumastuti	21; 13	21; 10
4	(South Korea) (Indonesia)	Jung Kyung-eun / Kim Ha-na; Suci Rizky Andini / Tiara Rosalia Nuraidah	20; 22	22; 20	21; 19
5	(South Korea) (Indonesia)	Kim Hyo-min; Adriyanti Firdasari	15; 21	13; 21

=== Australia vs Singapore ===
Australia
0
Siri Fort Indoor Stadium Court 4
21 May 2014

Singapore
5

			1	2	3
1	(Australia) (Singapore)	Tara Pilven; Chen Jiayuan	11; 21	15; 21
2	(Australia) (Singapore)	Tang Hetian / Renuga Veeran; Shinta Mulia Sari / Yao Lei	18; 21	12; 21
3	(Australia) (Singapore)	Verdet Kessler; Liang Xiaoyu	10; 21	15; 21
4	(Australia) (Singapore)	Jacqueline Guan / Gronya Somerville; Vanessa Neo / Tan Wei Han	7; 21	17; 21
5	(Australia) (Singapore)	Joy Lai; Fu Mingtian	15; 21	14; 21

== Group Y ==
Team	Pts	Pld	W	L	MF	MA
India	6	3	3	0	12	3
Thailand	4	3	2	1	10	5
Hong Kong	2	3	1	2	7	8
Canada	0	3	0	3	1	14

=== India vs Canada ===
India
5
Siri Fort Indoor Stadium Court 1
18 May 2014

Canada
0

			1	2	3
1	(India) (Canada)	Saina Nehwal; Joycelyn Ko	21; 4	21; 12
2	(India) (Canada)	P. V. Sindhu; Rachel Honderich	21; 16	21; 3
3	(India) (Canada)	Jwala Gutta / Ashwini Ponnappa; Alex Bruce / Phyllis Chan	21; 11	21; 12
4	(India) (Canada)	P. C. Thulasi; Brittney Tam	21; 11	21; 13
5	(India) (Canada)	Pradnya Gadre / N. Sikki Reddy; Grace Gao / Rachel Honderich	20; 22	21; 18	21; 16

=== Thailand vs Hong Kong ===
Thailand
3
Siri Fort Indoor Stadium Court 2
18 May 2014

Hong Kong
2

			1	2	3
1	(Thailand) (Hong Kong)	Ratchanok Intanon; Yip Pui Yin	21; 9	21; 13
2	(Thailand) (Hong Kong)	Savitree Amitrapai / Duanganong Aroonkesorn; Chau Hoi Wah / Poon Lok Yan	18; 21	15; 21
3	(Thailand) (Hong Kong)	Nitchaon Jindapol; Cheung Ying Mei	21; 11	21; 12
4	(Thailand) (Hong Kong)	Sapsiree Taerattanachai / Kunchala Voravichitchaikul; Chan Tsz Ka / Tse Ying Suet	15; 21	21; 15	15; 21
5	(Thailand) (Hong Kong)	Busanan Ongbamrungphan; Chan Hung Yung	21; 12	21; 16

=== India vs Hong Kong ===
India
4
Siri Fort Indoor Stadium Court 1
19 May 2014

Hong Kong
1

			1	2	3
1	(India) (Hong Kong)	Saina Nehwal; Yip Pui Yin	21; 9	21; 10
2	(India) (Hong Kong)	Jwala Gutta / Ashwini Ponnappa; Chau Hoi Wah / Poon Lok Yan	21; 17	21; 13
3	(India) (Hong Kong)	P. V. Sindhu; Cheung Ying Mei	21; 8	21; 10
4	(India) (Hong Kong)	Pradnya Gadre / N. Sikki Reddy; Chan Tsz Ka / Tse Ying Suet	14; 21	11; 21
5	(India) (Hong Kong)	P. C. Thulasi; Chan Hung Yung	19; 21	21; 16	21; 7

=== Thailand vs Canada ===
Thailand
5
Siri Fort Indoor Stadium Court 3
19 May 2014

Canada
0

			1	2	3
1	(Thailand) (Canada)	Porntip Buranaprasertsuk; Joycelyn Ko	21; 8	21; 10
2	(Thailand) (Canada)	Nitchaon Jindapol; Rachel Honderich	21; 6	21; 9
3	(Thailand) (Canada)	Duanganong Aroonkesorn / Kunchala Voravichitchaikul; Alex Bruce / Phyllis Chan	21; 11	21; 9
4	(Thailand) (Canada)	Busanan Ongbamrungphan; Brittney Tam	21; 10	21; 8
5	(Thailand) (Canada)	Puttita Supajirakul / Sapsiree Taerattanachai; Grace Gao / Rachel Honderich	21; 15	21; 23	21; 14

=== Thailand vs India ===
Thailand
2
Siri Fort Indoor Stadium Court 1
20 May 2014

India
3

			1	2	3
1	(Thailand) (India)	Ratchanok Intanon; Saina Nehwal	20; 22	14; 21
2	(Thailand) (India)	Porntip Buranaprasertsuk; P. V. Sindhu	19; 21	14; 21
3	(Thailand) (India)	Savitree Amitrapai / Duanganong Aroonkesorn; Jwala Gutta / Ashwini Ponnappa	16; 21	13; 21
4	(Thailand) (India)	Busanan Ongbamrungphan; P. C. Thulasi	21; 15	21; 10
5	(Thailand) (India)	Sapsiree Taerattanachai / Kunchala Voravichitchaikul; Saina Nehwal / P. V. Sindhu	21; 12	18; 21	21; 15

=== Canada vs Hong Kong ===
Canada
1
Siri Fort Indoor Stadium Court 3
20 May 2014

Hong Kong
4

			1	2	3
1	(Canada) (Hong Kong)	Joycelyn Ko; Yip Pui Yin	14; 21	14; 21
2	(Canada) (Hong Kong)	Rachel Honderich; Cheung Ying Mei	21; 8	13; 21	21; 18
3	(Canada) (Hong Kong)	Alex Bruce / Phyllis Chan; Chan Tsz Ka / Tse Ying Suet	12; 21	9; 21
4	(Canada) (Hong Kong)	Brittney Tam; Chan Hung Yung	19; 21	16; 21
5	(Canada) (Hong Kong)	Grace Gao / Rachel Honderich; Poon Lok Yan / Yuen Sin Ying	13; 21	6; 21

== Group Z ==
Team	Pts	Pld	W	L	MF	MA
Japan	6	3	3	0	13	2
Denmark	4	3	2	1	9	6
Malaysia	2	3	1	2	8	7
Germany	0	3	0	3	0	15

=== Denmark vs Malaysia ===
Denmark
3
Siri Fort Indoor Stadium Court 1
19 May 2014

Malaysia
2

			1	2	3
1	(Denmark) (Malaysia)	Line Kjærsfeldt; Tee Jing Yi	14; 21	20; 22
2	(Denmark) (Malaysia)	Christinna Pedersen / Kamilla Rytter Juhl; Vivian Hoo / Woon Khe Wei	21; 17	21; 10
3	(Denmark) (Malaysia)	Anna Thea Madsen; Yang Li Lian	21; 13	15; 21	21; 19
4	(Denmark) (Malaysia)	LLine Damkjær Kruse / Marie Røpke; Lee Meng Yean / Lim Yin Loo	19; 21	21; 16	21; 19
5	(Denmark) (Malaysia)	Sandra-Maria Jensen; Lim Yin Fun	15; 21	21; 14	19; 21

=== Japan vs Germany ===
Japan
5
Siri Fort Indoor Stadium Court 3
19 May 2014

Germany
0

			1	2	3
1	(Japan) (Germany)	Minatsu Mitani; Karin Schnaase	18; 21	21; 11	21; 14
2	(Japan) (Germany)	Misaki Matsutomo / Ayaka Takahashi; Isabel Herttrich / Birgit Michels	21; 15	21; 18
3	(Japan) (Germany)	Eriko Hirose; Fabienne Deprez	21; 10	21; 10
4	(Japan) (Germany)	Reika Kakiiwa / Miyuki Maeda; Johanna Goliszewski / Carla Nelte	21; 16	21; 14
5	(Japan) (Germany)	Akane Yamaguchi; Alina Hammes	21; 9	21; 17

=== Japan vs Malaysia ===
Japan
4
Siri Fort Indoor Stadium Court 1
20 May 2014

Malaysia
1

			1	2	3
1	(Japan) (Malaysia)	Sayaka Takahashi; Tee Jing Yi	20; 22	19; 21
2	(Japan) (Malaysia)	Misaki Matsutomo / Ayaka Takahashi; Amelia Alicia Anscelly / Soong Fie Cho	21; 13	21; 10
3	(Japan) (Malaysia)	Eriko Hirose; Lim Yin Fun	23; 21	21; 12
4	(Japan) (Malaysia)	Shizuka Matsuo / Mami Naito; Vivian Hoo / Lee Meng Yean	21; 17	21; 8
5	(Japan) (Malaysia)	Akane Yamaguchi; Lim Chiew Sien	21; 19	21; 14

=== Denmark vs Germany ===
Denmark
5
Siri Fort Indoor Stadium Court 3
20 May 2014

Germany
0

			1	2	3
1	(Denmark) (Germany)	Line Kjærsfeldt; Karin Schnaase	23; 21	21; 18
2	(Denmark) (Germany)	Christinna Pedersen / Kamilla Rytter Juhl; Johanna Goliszewski / Isabel Herttrich	4; 2			retired
3	(Denmark) (Germany)	Anna Thea Madsen; Fabienne Deprez	21; 14	12; 21	21; 17
4	(Denmark) (Germany)	Line Damkjær Kruse / Marie Røpke; Birgit Michels / Carla Nelte	21; 19	21; 11
5	(Denmark) (Germany)	Sandra-Maria Jensen; Anika Dörr	18; 21	21; 11	21; 16

=== Japan vs Denmark ===
Japan
4
Siri Fort Indoor Stadium Court 1
21 May 2014

Denmark
1

			1	2	3
1	(Japan) (Denmark)	Minatsu Mitani; Line Kjærsfeldt	21; 19	21; 9
2	(Japan) (Denmark)	Misaki Matsutomo / Ayaka Takahashi; Christinna Pedersen / Kamilla Rytter Juhl	21; 15	15; 21	21; 12
3	(Japan) (Denmark)	Sayaka Takahashi; Sandra-Maria Jensen	21; 16	11; 21	21; 11
4	(Japan) (Denmark)	Reika Kakiiwa / Miyuki Maeda; Line Damkjær Kruse / Marie Røpke	18; 21	15; 21
5	(Japan) (Denmark)	Akane Yamaguchi; Mia Blichfeldt	21; 9	16; 21	21; 18

=== Malaysia vs Germany ===
Malaysia
5
Siri Fort Indoor Stadium Court 3
21 May 2014

Germany
0

			1	2	3
1	(Malaysia) (Germany)	Tee Jing Yi; Karin Schnaase	21; 13	21; 18
2	(Malaysia) (Germany)	Vivian Hoo / Woon Khe Wei; Isabel Herttrich / Carla Nelte	21; 16	21; 15
3	(Malaysia) (Germany)	Yang Li Lian; Fabienne Deprez	21; 18	21; 17
4	(Malaysia) (Germany)	Amelia Alicia Anscelly / Soong Fie Cho; Birgit Michels / Karin Schnaase	21; 13	21; 19
5	(Malaysia) (Germany)	Lim Chiew Sien; Anika Dörr	21; 16	21; 15
