= 2014 Thomas & Uber Cup =

2014 Thomas & Uber Cup 2014 थॉमस एंड उबेर कप

Tournament details
- Dates: 18–25 May 2014
- Edition: 28th (Thomas Cup); 25th (Uber Cup)
- Level: International
- Venue: Siri Fort Sports Complex
- Location: New Delhi, India

The 2014 Thomas & Uber Cup was the 28th tournament of the Thomas Cup and 25th tournament of the Uber Cup, the badminton team championships for men and women respectively. It was held on 18–25 May 2014 at the Siri Fort Sports Complex in New Delhi, India. This is the first time India hosted the two cups.

The Thomas Cup final featured two teams not expected to make it there as Japan faced Malaysia. In a back-and-forth contest, Japan came out on top by a score of 3 matches to 2, winning their first Thomas Cup. The Uber Cup final featured the top two teams, China and Japan. Backed by wins from the world's top two singles players, China came out on top by a 3–1 score. It was their 13th title overall.

== Host city selection ==
New Delhi was awarded with this event by Badminton World Federation in April 2013. This event marked the first time India hosted the Thomas and Uber Cup finals after hosting 2009 BWF World Championships in Hyderabad.

== Qualifiers ==
Confederation	Qualifier	
Confederation	Thomas Cup	Uber Cup
Asia	Indonesia; Malaysia; Japan; South Korea; Thailand; Chinese Taipei; Hong Kong; Singapore	Indonesia; Malaysia; Japan; South Korea; Thailand; Chinese Taipei; Hong Kong; Singapore
Europe	Denmark; Germany; England; Russia; France	Denmark; Germany; Russia; England
Pan Am	—	Canada
Oceania	—	Australia
Africa	Nigeria	—
Defending Champions	China	China
Host	India	India

== Seedings ==
The seeding list was based on 6 March 2014 world rankings as the draw was conducted on 30 March 2014. The top four seeded teams were in the first pot, followed by the next four teams in the second pot, the next four teams in the third pot, and the last four teams were in the fourth pot.

The knock out draw was held immediately after the group stage was completed.

Thomas Cup

1. Indonesia
2. China
3. Malaysia
4. Japan
5. Denmark
6. South Korea
7. Thailand
8. Chinese Taipei
9. India
10. Hong Kong
11. Germany
12. England
13. Russia
14. France
15. Singapore
16. Nigeria

Uber Cup

1. China
2. Japan
3. Thailand
4. South Korea
5. Indonesia
6. Denmark
7. India
8. Chinese Taipei
9. Germany
10. Hong Kong
11. Singapore
12. Malaysia
13. Russia
14. England
15. Canada
16. Australia

== Medal summary ==
=== Medalists ===
Event	Gold	Silver	Bronze
Thomas Cup	Japan; Kenichi Tago; Kento Momota; Sho Sasaki; Takuma Ueda; Hiroyuki Endo; Kenichi Hayakawa; Takeshi Kamura; Keigo Sonoda; Hirokatsu Hashimoto; Noriyasu Hirata	Malaysia; Lee Chong Wei; Chong Wei Feng; Daren Liew; Goh Soon Huat; Hoon Thien How; Tan Wee Kiong; Goh V Shem; Lim Khim Wah; Tan Boon Heong; Chan Peng Soon	China; Chen Long; Du Pengyu; Tian Houwei; Lin Dan; Liu Xiaolong; Qiu Zihan; Chai Biao; Hong Wei; Fu Haifeng; Zhang Nan
Thomas Cup	Japan; Kenichi Tago; Kento Momota; Sho Sasaki; Takuma Ueda; Hiroyuki Endo; Kenichi Hayakawa; Takeshi Kamura; Keigo Sonoda; Hirokatsu Hashimoto; Noriyasu Hirata	Malaysia; Lee Chong Wei; Chong Wei Feng; Daren Liew; Goh Soon Huat; Hoon Thien How; Tan Wee Kiong; Goh V Shem; Lim Khim Wah; Tan Boon Heong; Chan Peng Soon	Indonesia; Tommy Sugiarto; Dionysius Hayom Rumbaka; Simon Santoso; Ihsan Maulana Mustofa; Mohammad Ahsan; Hendra Setiawan; Angga Pratama; Rian Agung Saputro; Berry Angriawan; Ricky Karanda Suwardi
Uber Cup	China; Li Xuerui; Wang Shixian; Wang Yihan; Sun Yu; Wang Xiaoli; Bao Yixin; Tang Jinhua; Tian Qing; Zhao Yunlei; Ma Jin	Japan; Minatsu Mitani; Sayaka Takahashi; Eriko Hirose; Akane Yamaguchi; Misaki Matsutomo; Ayaka Takahashi; Reika Kakiiwa; Miyuki Maeda; Shizuka Matsuo; Mami Naito	South Korea; Sung Ji-hyun; Bae Yeon-ju; Kim Hyo-min; Lee Min-ji; Chang Ye-na; Kim So-yeong; Jung Kyung-eun; Kim Ha-na; Go Ah-ra; Yoo Hae-won
Uber Cup	China; Li Xuerui; Wang Shixian; Wang Yihan; Sun Yu; Wang Xiaoli; Bao Yixin; Tang Jinhua; Tian Qing; Zhao Yunlei; Ma Jin	Japan; Minatsu Mitani; Sayaka Takahashi; Eriko Hirose; Akane Yamaguchi; Misaki Matsutomo; Ayaka Takahashi; Reika Kakiiwa; Miyuki Maeda; Shizuka Matsuo; Mami Naito	India; Saina Nehwal; P. V. Sindhu; Tanvi Lad; P. C. Thulasi; Sayali Gokhale; Jwala Gutta; Ashwini Ponnappa; Pradnya Gadre; N. Sikki Reddy; Aparna Balan

=== Medal table ===
* Host nation (India)

Rank	Nation	Gold	Silver	Bronze	Total
1	Japan	1	1	0	2
2	China	1	0	1	2
3	Malaysia	0	1	0	1
4	India*	0	0	1	1
4	Indonesia	0	0	1	1
4	South Korea	0	0	1	1
Totals (6 entries)		2	2	4	8

== Thomas Cup ==
=== Groups ===
==== Group A ====
Team	Pts	Pld	W	L
Indonesia	6	3	3	0
Thailand	4	3	2	1
Singapore	2	3	1	2
Nigeria	0	3	0	3

19 May 2014
Indonesia	5–0	Singapore
Thailand	5–0	Nigeria
20 May 2014
Thailand	4–1	Singapore
Indonesia	5–0	Nigeria
21 May 2014
Indonesia	4–1	Thailand
Nigeria	0–5	Singapore

==== Group B ====
Team	Pts	Pld	W	L
Japan	6	3	3	0
Denmark	4	3	2	1
Hong Kong	2	3	1	2
England	0	3	0	3

18 May 2014
Denmark	4–1	Hong Kong
Japan	4–1	England
20 May 2014
Denmark	5–0	England
Japan	5–0	Hong Kong
21 May 2014
Japan	3–2	Denmark
Hong Kong	3–2	England

==== Group C ====
Team	Pts	Pld	W	L
Malaysia	6	3	3	0
South Korea	4	3	2	1
India	2	3	1	2
Germany	0	3	0	3

18 May 2014
Malaysia	4–1	India
South Korea	3–2	Germany
19 May 2014
South Korea	3–2	India
Malaysia	4–1	Germany
21 May 2014
Malaysia	3–2	South Korea
Germany	2–3	India

==== Group D ====
Team	Pts	Pld	W	L
China	6	3	3	0
France	4	3	2	1
Chinese Taipei	2	3	1	2
Russia	0	3	0	3

18 May 2014
China	5–0	France
Chinese Taipei	4–1	Russia
19 May 2014
China	5–0	Russia
Chinese Taipei	2–3	France
20 May 2014
China	5–0	Chinese Taipei
Russia	2–3	France

=== Knockout stage ===
All times are India Standard Time (UTC+05:30).

Quarter-finals
22 May 2014
China	3
Thailand	0
22 May 2014
Japan	3
France	1
22 May 2014
Denmark	1
Malaysia	3
22 May 2014
South Korea	2
Indonesia	3

Semi-finals
23 May 2014
China	0
Japan	3
23 May 2014
Malaysia	3
Indonesia	0

Final
25 May 2014
Japan	3
Malaysia	2

==== Quarterfinals ====
China
3
Siri Fort Sports Complex Court 1
22 May 2014
12:00

Thailand
0

			1	2	3
1	(China) (Thailand)	Chen Long; Boonsak Ponsana	21; 16	21; 8
2	(China) (Thailand)	Chai Biao / Hong Wei; Maneepong Jongjit / Nipitphon Puangpuapech	21; 18	21; 14
3	(China) (Thailand)	Du Pengyu; Tanongsak Saensomboonsuk	21; 14	22; 20
4	(China) (Thailand)	Fu Haifeng / Zhang Nan; Wannawat Ampunsuwan / Patiphat Chalardchaleam				not played
5	(China) (Thailand)	Lin Dan; Suppanyu Avihingsanon				not played

Japan
3
Siri Fort Sports Complex Court 3
22 May 2014
12:00

France
1

			1	2	3
1	(Japan) (France)	Kenichi Tago; Brice Leverdez	14; 21	21; 15	16; 21
2	(Japan) (France)	Sho Sasaki; Lucas Corvee	21; 12	21; 11
3	(Japan) (France)	Takeshi Kamura / Keigo Sonoda; Bastian Kersaudy / Gaetan Mittelheisser	21; 8	21; 13
4	(Japan) (France)	Takuma Ueda; Thomas Rouxel	21; 13	21; 12
5	(Japan) (France)	Hiroyuki Endo / Kenichi Hayakawa; Lucas Corvee / Brice Leverdez				not played

Denmark
1
Siri Fort Sports Complex Court 2
22 May 2014
18:00

Malaysia
3

			1	2	3
1	(Denmark) (Malaysia)	Jan Ø. Jørgensen; Lee Chong Wei	22; 20	14; 21	17; 21
2	(Denmark) (Malaysia)	Mads Conrad-Petersen / Mads Pieler Kolding; Hoon Thien How / Tan Boon Heong	21; 14	21; 18
3	(Denmark) (Malaysia)	Hans-Kristian Vittinghus; Chong Wei Feng	21; 19	14; 21	8; 21
4	(Denmark) (Malaysia)	Joachim Fischer Nielsen / Carsten Mogensen; Goh V Shem / Tan Wee Kiong	19; 21	13; 21
5	(Denmark) (Malaysia)	Viktor Axelsen; Daren Liew				not played

South Korea
2
Siri Fort Sports Complex Court 4
22 May 2014
18:00

Indonesia
3

			1	2	3
1	(South Korea) (Indonesia)	Son Wan-ho; Tommy Sugiarto	23; 21	24; 22
2	(South Korea) (Indonesia)	Lee Yong-dae / Yoo Yeon-seong; Mohammad Ahsan / Hendra Setiawan	15; 21	21; 17	19; 21
3	(South Korea) (Indonesia)	Lee Dong-keun; Dionysius Hayom Rumbaka	17; 21	16; 21
4	(South Korea) (Indonesia)	Kim Ki-jung / Kim Sa-rang; Angga Pratama / Rian Agung Saputro	21; 14	10; 21	21; 13
5	(South Korea) (Indonesia)	Hwang Jong-soo; Simon Santoso	12; 21	20; 22

==== Semifinals ====
China
0
Siri Fort Sports Complex Court 1
23 May 2014
12:00

Japan
3

			1	2	3
1	(China) (Japan)	Chen Long; Kenichi Tago	13; 21	11; 21
2	(China) (Japan)	Chai Biao / Hong Wei; Hiroyuki Endo / Kenichi Hayakawa	20; 22	19; 21
3	(China) (Japan)	Du Pengyu; Kento Momota	25; 23	18; 21	14; 21
4	(China) (Japan)	Fu Haifeng / Zhang Nan; Takeshi Kamura / Keigo Sonoda				not played
5	(China) (Japan)	Lin Dan; Sho Sasaki				not played

Malaysia
3
Siri Fort Sports Complex Court 2
23 May 2014
18:00

Indonesia
0

			1	2	3
1	(Malaysia) (Indonesia)	Lee Chong Wei; Tommy Sugiarto	21; 19	21; 13
2	(Malaysia) (Indonesia)	Hoon Thien How / Tan Boon Heong; Mohammad Ahsan / Hendra Setiawan	21; 19	8; 21	23; 21
3	(Malaysia) (Indonesia)	Chong Wei Feng; Dionysius Hayom Rumbaka	21; 10	21; 17
4	(Malaysia) (Indonesia)	Goh V Shem / Tan Wee Kiong; Angga Pratama / Rian Agung Saputro				not played
5	(Malaysia) (Indonesia)	Daren Liew; Simon Santoso				not played

The top four teams in the semi-final were the top four seeded teams in this competition. They also won their respective groups.

==== Final ====
Both Japan and Malaysia arrived in the final having already surpassed expectations by defeating traditional powerhouses China and Indonesia in the semi-final, both with 3–0 scores.

In the first singles matches, Malaysia's world number one Lee Chong Wei defeated Japan's Kenichi Tago in straight sets. In the next match, Malaysia's scratch combination of Hoon Thien How and Tan Boon Heong won the first set, but Japan's world number three pair of Kenichi Hayakawa and Hiroyuki Endo stayed close and pipped their opponent to win the match. In the second singles match, upcoming Japanese player Kento Momota bested Chong Wei Feng in straight sets. The second doubles match was perhaps the most explosive, with quick volleys, many powerful smashes, and several diving saves. In the end, Malaysia's doubles team of Goh V Shem and Tan Wee Kiong stayed unbeaten during the tournament and leveled the best of five contest by defeating Japan's Keigo Sonoda and Takeshi Kamura in three sets. Thus, the hopes of both countries fell to the third singles players. Malaysia's Daren Liew got out to an early lead, but as the game progressed he made a couple of errors, misjudging the shuttle. Japan's Takuma Ueda won the match in three sets, giving Japan their first title.

Japan
3
Siri Fort Sports Complex Court 1
25 May 2014
15:00

Malaysia
2

			1	2	3
1	(Japan) (Malaysia)	Kenichi Tago; Lee Chong Wei	12; 21	16; 21
2	(Japan) (Malaysia)	Hiroyuki Endo / Kenichi Hayakawa; Hoon Thien How / Tan Boon Heong	12; 21	21; 17	21; 19
3	(Japan) (Malaysia)	Kento Momota; Chong Wei Feng	21; 15	21; 17
4	(Japan) (Malaysia)	Takeshi Kamura / Keigo Sonoda; Goh V Shem / Tan Wee Kiong	21; 19	17; 21	12; 21
5	(Japan) (Malaysia)	Takuma Ueda; Daren Liew	21; 12	18; 21	21; 17

2014 Thomas Cup champion

Japan
First title

== Uber Cup ==
=== Groups ===
==== Group W ====
Team	Pts	Pld	W	L
China	6	3	3	0
England	4	3	2	1
Chinese Taipei	2	3	1	2
Russia	0	3	0	3

18 May 2014
China	5–0	Russia
Chinese Taipei	2–3	England
20 May 2014
China	5–0	England
Chinese Taipei	4–1	Russia
21 May 2014
China	5–0	Chinese Taipei
England	4–1	Russia

==== Group X ====
Team	Pts	Pld	W	L
South Korea	6	3	3	0
Indonesia	4	3	2	1
Singapore	2	3	1	2
Australia	0	3	0	3

18 May 2014
Indonesia	5–0	Australia
South Korea	5–0	Singapore
20 May 2014
Indonesia	4–1	Singapore
South Korea	5–0	Australia
21 May 2014
South Korea	4–1	Indonesia
Australia	0–5	Singapore

==== Group Y ====
Team	Pts	Pld	W	L
India	6	3	3	0
Thailand	4	3	2	1
Hong Kong	2	3	1	2
Canada	0	3	0	3

18 May 2014
India	5–0	Canada
Thailand	3–2	Hong Kong
19 May 2014
India	4–1	Hong Kong
Thailand	5–0	Canada
20 May 2014
Thailand	2–3	India
Canada	1–4	Hong Kong

==== Group Z ====
Team	Pts	Pld	W	L
Japan	6	3	3	0
Denmark	4	3	2	1
Malaysia	2	3	1	2
Germany	0	3	0	3

19 May 2014
Denmark	3–2	Malaysia
Japan	5–0	Germany
20 May 2014
Japan	4–1	Malaysia
Denmark	5–0	Germany
21 May 2014
Japan	4–1	Denmark
Malaysia	5–0	Germany

=== Knockout stage ===
Quarter-finals
22 May 2014
China	3
England	0
22 May 2014
South Korea	3
Thailand	1
22 May 2014
Indonesia	0
India	3
22 May 2014
Denmark	0
Japan	3

Semi-finals
23 May 2014
China	3
South Korea	0
23 May 2014
India	2
Japan	3

Final
24 May 2014
China	3
Japan	1

==== Quarterfinals ====
South Korea
3
Siri Fort Sports Complex Court 4
22 May 2014
12:00

Thailand
1

			1	2	3
1	(South Korea) (Thailand)	Sung Ji-hyun; Ratchanok Intanon	15; 21	15; 21
2	(South Korea) (Thailand)	Jang Ye-na / Kim So-young; Sapsiree Taerattanachai / Kunchala Voravichitchaikul	21; 19	21; 17
3	(South Korea) (Thailand)	Bae Youn-joo; Nichaon Jindapon	21; 8	17; 21	21; 17
4	(South Korea) (Thailand)	Jung Kyung-eun / Kim Ha-na; Porntip Buranaprasertsuk / Puttita Supajirakul	21; 10	21; 19
5	(South Korea) (Thailand)	Kim Hyo-min; Busanan Ongbumrungpan				not played

Denmark
0
Siri Fort Sports Complex Court 2
22 May 2014
12:00

Japan
3

			1	2	3
1	(Denmark) (Japan)	Line Kjaersfeldt; Minatsu Mitani	18; 21	21; 9	21; 23
2	(Denmark) (Japan)	Christinna Pedersen / Kamilla Rytter Juhl; Misaki Matsutomo / Ayaka Takahashi	12; 21	13; 21
3	(Denmark) (Japan)	Anna Thea Madsen; Sayaka Takahashi	14; 21	17; 21
4	(Denmark) (Japan)	Line Damkjaer Kruse / Marie Roepke; Reika Kakiiwa / Miyuki Maeda				not played
5	(Denmark) (Japan)	Sandra-Maria Jensen; Akane Yamaguchi				not played

China
3
Siri Fort Sports Complex Court 3
22 May 2014
18:00

England
0

			1	2	3
1	(China) (England)	Li Xuerui; Fontaine Mica Chapman	21; 15	21; 9
2	(China) (England)	Bao Yixin / Tang Jinhua; Gabrielle Adcock / Lauren Smith	22; 20	21; 10
3	(China) (England)	Wang Shixian; Sarah Walker	21; 7	21; 13
4	(China) (England)	Wang Xiaoli / Zhao Yunlei; Heather Olver / Kate Robertshaw				not played
5	(China) (England)	Wang Yihan; Panuga Riou				not played

Indonesia
0
Siri Fort Sports Complex Court 1
22 May 2014
18:00

India
3

			1	2	3
1	(Indonesia) (India)	Lindaweni Fanetri; Saina Nehwal	17; 21	10; 21
2	(Indonesia) (India)	Bellaetrix Manuputty; Pusarla Venkata Sindhu	16; 21	21; 10	23; 25
3	(Indonesia) (India)	Nitya Krishinda Maheswari / Greysia Polii; Jwala Gutta / Ashwini Ponnappa	18; 21	18; 21
4	(Indonesia) (India)	Adriyanti Firdasari; Puthenpurayil Chandrika Thulasi				not played
5	(Indonesia) (India)	Suci Rizki Andini / Tiara Rosalia Nuraidah; Saina Nehwal / Pusarla Venkata Sindhu				not played

==== Semifinals ====
China
3
Siri Fort Sports Complex Court 2
23 May 2014
12:00

South Korea
0

			1	2	3
1	(China) (South Korea)	Li Xuerui; Sung Ji-hyun	21; 11	21; 19
2	(China) (South Korea)	Bao Yixin / Tang Jinhua; Jang Ye-na / Kim So-young	21; 11	21; 12
3	(China) (South Korea)	Wang Shixian; Bae Youn-joo	21; 13	16; 21	21; 10
4	(China) (South Korea)	Wang Xiaoli / Zhao Yunlei; Jung Kyung-eun / Kim Ha-na				not played
5	(China) (South Korea)	Wang Yihan; Kim Hyo-min				not played

India
2
Siri Fort Sports Complex Court 1
23 May 2014
18:00

Japan
3

			1	2	3
1	(India) (Japan)	Saina Nehwal; Minatsu Mitani	21; 12	21; 13
2	(India) (Japan)	Pusarla Venkata Sindhu; Sayaka Takahashi	19; 21	21; 18	26; 24
3	(India) (Japan)	Jwala Gutta / Ashwini Ponnappa; Misaki Matsutomo / Ayaka Takahashi	12; 21	22; 20	16; 21
4	(India) (Japan)	Puthenpurayil Chandrika Thulasi; Eriko Hirose	14; 21	15; 21
5	(India) (Japan)	Saina Nehwal / Pusarla Venkata Sindhu; Reika Kakiiwa / Miyuki Maeda	14; 21	11; 21

Three of the teams in the semi-final were among the top four seeded teams in this competition. The other team is host India. All four teams won their respective groups.

==== Final ====
China and Japan were the top two seeded teams in the Uber Cup and faced each other in the final.

Olympic champion and world number one Li Xuerui quickly defeated her Japanese opponent Minatsu Mitani in straight sets. Japan evened the contest in the first doubles when Misaki Matsutomo and Ayaka Takahashi stopped China's top women pair, Bao Yixin and Tang Jinhua, in straight sets. World number two Wang Shixian put China back in front when she beat Japan's Sayaka Takahashi in another match that ended in straight sets. China clinched the title in the second doubles when Wang Xiaoli and Zhao Yunlei bested Miyuki Maeda and Reika Kakiiwa. China thus won the tie three matches to one.

China
3
Siri Fort Sports Complex Court 1
24 May 2014
15:00

Japan
1

			1	2	3
1	(China) (Japan)	Li Xuerui; Minatsu Mitani	21; 15	21; 5
2	(China) (Japan)	Bao Yixin / Tang Jinhua; Misaki Matsutomo / Ayaka Takahashi	18; 21	9; 21
3	(China) (Japan)	Wang Shixian; Sayaka Takahashi	21; 16	21; 12
4	(China) (Japan)	Wang Xiaoli / Zhao Yunlei; Reika Kakiiwa / Miyuki Maeda	21; 13	21; 6
5	(China) (Japan)	Wang Yihan; Akane Yamaguchi				not played

2014 Uber Cup champion

China
Thirteenth title
