= Badminton at the 2011 SEA Games – Women's team =

These are the results of the women's team competition in badminton at the 2011 SEA Games in Jakarta.

== Medalists ==
Gold	Silver	Bronze
Thailand (THA)	Indonesia (INA)	Singapore (SIN) Malaysia (MAS)

== Draw ==
Quarter-finals
Thailand
Bye
Singapore	3
Myanmar	0
Philippines	0
Malaysia	3
Vietnam	0
Indonesia	3

Semi-finals
Thailand	3
Singapore	0
Malaysia	1
Indonesia	3

Final
Thailand	3
Indonesia	1

=== Quarter-finals ===
Singapore
3
Senayan Sport Complex
2011-11-12
09:00

Myanmar
0

			1	2	3
1	(Singapore) (Myanmar)	Gu Juan; Khin Gone Yi Linn	21; 7	21; 7
2	(Singapore) (Myanmar)	Fu Mingtian; Khine Zar Lin	21; 12	21; 10
3	(Singapore) (Myanmar)	Vanessa Neo / Chen Jiayuan; Nay Zar Hlaing / Htoo Htoo Ya	21; 9	21; 2

Philippines
0
Senayan Sport Complex
2011-11-12
14:00

Malaysia
3

			1	2	3
1	(Philippines) (Malaysia)	Malvinne Alcala; Tee Jing Yi	14; 21	15; 21
2	(Philippines) (Malaysia)	Gelita Castilo; Lyddia Cheah	8; 21	10; 21
3	(Philippines) (Malaysia)	Bianca Carlos; Soniia Cheah Su Ya	21; 15	16; 21	12; 21

Vietnam
0
Senayan Sport Complex
2011-11-12
14:00

Indonesia
3

			1	2	3
1	(Vietnam) (Indonesia)	Vũ Thị Trang; Lindaweni Fanetri	16; 21	12; 21
2	(Vietnam) (Indonesia)	Thái Thị Hồng Gấm / Phùng Nguyễn Phương Nhi; Nitya Krishinda Maheswari / Anneke Feinya Agustin	9; 21	8; 21
3	(Vietnam) (Indonesia)	Lê Thu Huyền; Adriyanti Firdasari	11; 21	11; 21

=== Semifinal ===
Thailand
3
Senayan Sport Complex
2011-11-13
09:00

Singapore
0

			1	2	3
1	(Thailand) (Singapore)	Porntip Buranaprasertsuk; Gu Juan	13; 21	21; 13	21; 10
2	(Thailand) (Singapore)	Duanganong Aroonkesorn / Kunchala Voravichitchaikul; Shinta Mulia Sari / Yao Lei	21; 19	19; 21	24; 22
3	(Thailand) (Singapore)	Ratchanok Intanon; Fu Mingtian	21; 19	9; 21	21; 16

Malaysia
1
Senayan Sport Complex
2011-11-13
09:00

Indonesia
3

			1	2	3
1	(Malaysia) (Indonesia)	Tee Jing Yi; Lindaweni Fanetri	21; 18	13; 21	15; 21
2	(Malaysia) (Indonesia)	Vivian Hoo / Woon Khe Wei; Vita Marissa / Nadya Melati	21; 19	21; 23	28; 26
3	(Malaysia) (Indonesia)	Lyddia Cheah; Adriyanti Firdasari	21; 7	13; 21	14; 21
4	(Malaysia) (Indonesia)	Marylen Ng / Lim Yin Loo; Nitya Krishinda Maheswari / Anneke Feinya Agustin	9; 21	16; 21

=== Final ===
Thailand
3
Senayan Sport Complex
2011-11-15
15:00

Indonesia
1

			1	2	3
1	(Thailand) (Indonesia)	Porntip Buranaprasertsuk; Lindaweni Fanetri	17; 21	21; 11	21; 16
2	(Thailand) (Indonesia)	Duanganong Aroonkesorn / Kunchala Voravichitchaikul; Anneke Feinya Agustin / Nitya Krishinda Maheswari	20; 22	9; 21
3	(Thailand) (Indonesia)	Ratchanok Intanon; Adriyanti Firdasari	21; 12	19; 21	21; 19
4	(Thailand) (Indonesia)	Savitree Amitapai / Saralee Thungthongkam; Liliyana Natsir / Vita Marissa	19; 21	21; 16	24; 22
