= Badminton at the 2011 SEA Games – Women's singles =

These are the results of the women's singles competition in badminton at the 2011 SEA Games in Jakarta.

== Medalists ==
| Gold | Silver | Bronze |
|---|---|---|
| Fu Mingtian (SIN) | Adriyanti Firdasari (INA) | Porntip Buranaprasertsuk (THA); Ratchanok Intanon (THA) |

== Draw ==
First round
1 | (Thailand) Porntip Buranaprasertsuk
Bye
(Philippines) Bianca Carlos | 7 | 11
(Malaysia) Tee Jing Yi | 21 | 21
3 | (Singapore) Gu Juan | 21 | 21
(Vietnam) Phùng Nguyễn Phương Nhi | 12 | 15
(Indonesia) Adriyanti Firdasari | 21 | 21
(Myanmar) Thet Htar Thuzar | 7 | 9
(Malaysia) Lyddia Cheah | 21 | 19 | 21
(Philippines) Malvinne Alcala | 13 | 21 | 14
(Indonesia) Bellaetrix Manuputty | 14 | 19
4 | (Singapore) Fu Mingtian | 21 | 21
(Vietnam) Vũ Thị Trang | 21 | 21
(Myanmar) Khine Zar Lin | 1 | 12
Bye
2 | (Thailand) Ratchanok Intanon

Quarterfinals
1 | (Thailand) Porntip Buranaprasertsuk | 16 | 21 | 21
(Malaysia) Tee Jing Yi | 21 | 14 | 17
3 | (Singapore) Gu Juan | 22 | 16
(Indonesia) Adriyanti Firdasari | 24 | 21
(Malaysia) Lyddia Cheah | 21 | 14
4 | (Singapore) Fu Mingtian | 23 | 21
(Vietnam) Vũ Thị Trang | 12 | 18
2 | (Thailand) Ratchanok Intanon | 21 | 21

Semifinals
1 | (Thailand) Porntip Buranaprasertsuk | 15 | 21 | 15
(Indonesia) Adriyanti Firdasari | 21 | 14 | 21
4 | (Singapore) Fu Mingtian | 21 | 19 | 22
2 | (Thailand) Ratchanok Intanon | 17 | 21 | 20

Finals
(Indonesia) Adriyanti Firdasari | 21 | 12 | 20
4 | (Singapore) Fu Mingtian | 14 | 21 | 22
