= 2014 Thomas Cup group stage =

This article lists the complete results of the group stage of the 2014 Thomas Cup in New Delhi, India. All times are India Standard Time (UTC+05:30).

== Group A ==
Team	Pts	Pld	W	L	MF	MA
Indonesia	6	3	3	0	14	1
Thailand	4	3	2	1	10	5
Singapore	2	3	1	2	6	9
Nigeria	0	3	0	3	0	15

=== Indonesia vs Singapore ===
Indonesia
5
Siri Fort Indoor Stadium Court 1
19 May 2014

Singapore
0

			1	2	3
1	(Indonesia) (Singapore)	Tommy Sugiarto; Derek Wong Zi Liang	21; 11	17; 21	21; 15
2	(Indonesia) (Singapore)	Mohammad Ahsan / Hendra Setiawan; Danny Bawa Chrisnanta / Chayut Triyachart	21; 15	21; 16
3	(Indonesia) (Singapore)	Dionysius Hayom Rumbaka; Huang Chao	21; 17	21; 14
4	(Indonesia) (Singapore)	Angga Pratama / Rian Agung Saputro; Terry Hee Yong Kai / Derek Wong Zi Liang	21; 9	21; 15
5	(Indonesia) (Singapore)	Simon Santoso; Sean Lee Kwan Ting	21; 16	22; 20

=== Thailand vs Nigeria ===
Thailand
5
Siri Fort Indoor Stadium Court 3
19 May 2014

Nigeria
0

			1	2	3
1	(Thailand) (Nigeria)	Boonsak Ponsana; Jinkan Ifraimu Bulus	21; 15	21; 7
2	(Thailand) (Nigeria)	Tanongsak Saensomboonsuk; Enejoh Abah	21; 17	17; 21	21; 8
3	(Thailand) (Nigeria)	Suppanyu Avihingsanon; Victor Makanju	21; 7	21; 14
4	(Thailand) (Nigeria)	Sudket Prapakamol / Nipitphon Puangpuapech; Jinkan Ifraimu Bulus / Ola Fagbemi	21; 16	21; 16
5	(Thailand) (Nigeria)	Wannawat Ampunsuwan / Patiphat Chalardchaleam; Enejoh Abah / Victor Makanju	21; 9	21; 6

=== Thailand vs Singapore ===
Thailand
4
Siri Fort Indoor Stadium Court 1
20 May 2014

Singapore
1

			1	2	3
1	(Thailand) (Singapore)	Boonsak Ponsana; Derek Wong Zi Liang	21; 11	21; 11
2	(Thailand) (Singapore)	Patiphat Chalardchaleam / Sudket Prapakamol; Terry Hee Yong Kai / Chayut Triyachart	21; 16	13; 21	23; 21
3	(Thailand) (Singapore)	Tanongsak Saensomboonsuk; Huang Chao	21; 23	0; 0		retired
4	(Thailand) (Singapore)	Maneepong Jongjit / Nipitphon Puangpuapech; Danny Bawa Chrisnanta / Derek Wong Zi Liang	21; 15	21; 9
5	(Thailand) (Singapore)	Suppanyu Avihingsanon; Sean Lee Kwan Ting	21; 12	21; 15

=== Indonesia vs Nigeria ===
Indonesia
5
Siri Fort Indoor Stadium Court 3
20 May 2014

Nigeria
0

			1	2	3
1	(Indonesia) (Nigeria)	Tommy Sugiarto; Jinkan Ifraimu Bulus	21; 4	21; 12
2	(Indonesia) (Nigeria)	Dionysius Hayom Rumbaka; Enejoh Abah	21; 8	21; 10
3	(Indonesia) (Nigeria)	Simon Santoso; Victor Makanju	21; 7	21; 7
4	(Indonesia) (Nigeria)	Angga Pratama / Rian Agung Saputro; Jinkan Ifraimu Bulus / Ola Fagbemi	21; 13	21; 11
5	(Indonesia) (Nigeria)	Mohammad Ahsan / Hendra Setiawan; Enejoh Abah / Victor Makanju	21; 8	21; 8

=== Indonesia vs Thailand ===
Indonesia
4
Siri Fort Indoor Stadium Court 1
21 May 2014

Thailand
1

			1	2	3
1	(Indonesia) (Thailand)	Tommy Sugiarto; Boonsak Ponsana	21; 14	13; 21	17; 21
2	(Indonesia) (Thailand)	Mohammad Ahsan / Hendra Setiawan; Wannawat Ampunsuwan / Nipitphon Puangpuapech	21; 15	21; 14
3	(Indonesia) (Thailand)	Dionysius Hayom Rumbaka; Suppanyu Avihingsanon	21; 17	21; 19
4	(Indonesia) (Thailand)	Angga Pratama / Rian Agung Saputro; Patiphat Chalardchaleam / Maneepong Jongjit	21; 14	22; 20
5	(Indonesia) (Thailand)	Simon Santoso; Thammasin Sitthikom	21; 13	21; 13

=== Nigeria vs Singapore ===
Nigeria
0
Siri Fort Indoor Stadium Court 3
21 May 2014

Singapore
5

			1	2	3
1	(Nigeria) (Singapore)	Jinkan Ifraimu Bulus; Derek Wong Zi Liang	14; 21	8; 21
2	(Nigeria) (Singapore)	Enejoh Abah; Huang Chao	10; 21	19; 21
3	(Nigeria) (Singapore)	Victor Makanju; Sean Lee Kwan Ting	18; 21	12; 21
4	(Nigeria) (Singapore)	Enejoh Abah / Victor Makanju; Danny Bawa Chrisnanta / Terry Hee Yong Kai	7; 21	11; 21
5	(Nigeria) (Singapore)	Jinkan Ifraimu Bulus / Ola Fagbemi; Huang Chao / Sean Lee Kwan Ting	10; 21	12; 21

== Group B ==
Team	Pts	Pld	W	L	MF	MA
Japan	6	3	3	0	12	3
Denmark	4	3	2	1	11	4
Hong Kong	2	3	1	2	4	11
England	0	3	0	3	3	12

=== Denmark vs Hong Kong ===
Denmark
4
Siri Fort Indoor Stadium Court 1
18 May 2014

Hong Kong
1

			1	2	3
1	(Denmark) (Hong Kong)	Jan Ø. Jørgensen; Hu Yun	21; 11	21; 16
2	(Denmark) (Hong Kong)	Mads Conrad-Petersen / Mads Pieler Kolding; Law Cheuk Him / Ng Ka Long	21; 17	21; 14
3	(Denmark) (Hong Kong)	Viktor Axelsen; Wei Nan	14; 21	16; 21
4	(Denmark) (Hong Kong)	Joachim Fischer Nielsen / Carsten Mogensen; Lee Chun Hei / Tang Chun Man	21; 13	19; 21	21; 16
5	(Denmark) (Hong Kong)	Emil Holst; Wong Wing Ki	21; 14	15; 21	21; 9

=== Japan vs England ===
Japan
4
Siri Fort Indoor Stadium Court 3
18 May 2014

England
1

			1	2	3
1	(Japan) (England)	Kenichi Tago; Rajiv Ouseph	9; 21	22; 20	21; 13
2	(Japan) (England)	Hiroyuki Endo / Kenichi Hayakawa; Chris Adcock / Andrew Ellis	21; 7	18; 21	21; 8
3	(Japan) (England)	Kento Momota; Rhys Walker	21; 10	21; 14
4	(Japan) (England)	Hirokatsu Hashimoto / Noriyasu Hirata; Chris Langridge / Peter Mills	10; 21	13; 21
5	(Japan) (England)	Takuma Ueda; Sam Parsons	21; 9	21; 7

=== Denmark vs England ===
Denmark
5
Siri Fort Indoor Stadium Court 2
20 May 2014

England
0

			1	2	3
1	(Denmark) (England)	Jan Ø. Jørgensen; Rajiv Ouseph	21; 19	21; 17
2	(Denmark) (England)	Mads Conrad-Petersen / Mads Pieler Kolding; Chris Langridge / Peter Mills	21; 13	21; 16
3	(Denmark) (England)	Hans-Kristian Vittinghus; Toby Penty	21; 19	21; 18
4	(Denmark) (England)	Joachim Fischer Nielsen / Carsten Mogensen; Chris Adcock / Marcus Ellis	21; 16	21; 19
5	(Denmark) (England)	Viktor Axelsen; Rhys Walker	21; 10	21; 19

=== Japan vs Hong Kong ===
Japan
5
Siri Fort Indoor Stadium Court 4
20 May 2014

Hong Kong
0

			1	2	3
1	(Japan) (Hong Kong)	Kenichi Tago; Hu Yun	21; 14	17; 21	21; 16
2	(Japan) (Hong Kong)	Hiroyuki Endo / Kenichi Hayakawa; Lee Chun Hei / Tang Chun Man	21; 18	21; 19
3	(Japan) (Hong Kong)	Kento Momota; Wei Nan	21; 9	21; 14
4	(Japan) (Hong Kong)	Takeshi Kamura / Keigo Sonoda; Chan Yun Lung / Law Cheuk Him	21; 12	21; 17
5	(Japan) (Hong Kong)	Sho Sasaki; Ng Ka Long	8; 21	21; 14	21; 16

=== Japan vs Denmark ===
Japan
3
Siri Fort Indoor Stadium Court 1
21 May 2014

Denmark
2

			1	2	3
1	(Japan) (Denmark)	Kenichi Tago; Jan Ø. Jørgensen	21; 9	21; 11
2	(Japan) (Denmark)	Hiroyuki Endo / Kenichi Hayakawa; Mads Conrad-Petersen / Mads Pieler Kolding	17; 21	21; 17	18; 21
3	(Japan) (Denmark)	Kento Momota; Viktor Axelsen	21; 19	21; 19
4	(Japan) (Denmark)	Takeshi Kamura / Keigo Sonoda; Joachim Fischer Nielsen / Carsten Mogensen	13; 21	13; 21
5	(Japan) (Denmark)	Takuma Ueda; Emil Holst	21; 13	22; 20

=== Hong Kong vs England ===
Hong Kong
3
Siri Fort Indoor Stadium Court 3
21 May 2014

England
2

			1	2	3
1	(Hong Kong) (England)	Wei Nan; Rajiv Ouseph	22; 20	21; 13
2	(Hong Kong) (England)	Lee Chun Hei / Tang Chun Man; Chris Adcock / Andrew Ellis	13; 21	21; 17	17; 21
3	(Hong Kong) (England)	Wong Wing Ki; Rhys Walker	21; 11	21; 13
4	(Hong Kong) (England)	Chan Yun Lung / Law Cheuk Him; Chris Langridge / Peter Mills	15; 21	18; 21
5	(Hong Kong) (England)	Ng Ka Long; Sam Parsons	21; 14	21; 10

== Group C ==
Team	Pts	Pld	W	L	MF	MA
Malaysia	6	3	3	0	11	4
South Korea	4	3	2	1	8	7
India	2	3	1	2	6	9
Germany	0	3	0	3	5	10

=== Malaysia vs India ===
Malaysia
4
Siri Fort Indoor Stadium Court 1
18 May 2014

India
1

			1	2	3
1	(Malaysia) (India)	Lee Chong Wei; Srikanth Kidambi	21; 19	21; 12
2	(Malaysia) (India)	Hoon Thien How / Tan Boon Heong; Manu Attri / B. Sumeeth Reddy	21; 14	21; 11
3	(Malaysia) (India)	Chong Wei Feng; Kashyap Parupalli	21; 13	21; 6
4	(Malaysia) (India)	Goh V Shem / Tan Wee Kiong; Pranav Chopra / Akshay Dewalkar	21; 17	14; 21	21; 14
5	(Malaysia) (India)	Daren Liew; Rajah Menuri Venkata Gurusaidutt	21; 18	13; 21	19; 21

=== Korea vs Germany ===
South Korea
3
Siri Fort Indoor Stadium Court 3
18 May 2014

Germany
2

			1	2	3
1	(South Korea) (Germany)	Son Wan-ho; Marc Zwiebler	18; 21	17; 21
2	(South Korea) (Germany)	Lee Yong-dae / Yoo Yeon-seong; Michael Fuchs / Johannes Schöttler	21; 11	8; 21	21; 19
3	(South Korea) (Germany)	Lee Dong-keun; Dieter Domke	17; 21	16; 21
4	(South Korea) (Germany)	Kim Sa-rang / Ko Sung-hyun; Andreas Heinz / Max Schwenger	21; 16	21; 15
5	(South Korea) (Germany)	Hwang Jong-soo; Lukas Schmidt	21; 15	21; 16

=== Korea vs India ===
South Korea
3
Siri Fort Indoor Stadium Court 2
19 May 2014

India
2

			1	2	3
1	(South Korea) (India)	Son Wan-ho; Srikanth Kidambi	17; 21	21; 12	21; 18
2	(South Korea) (India)	Lee Yong-dae / Yoo Yeon-seong; Manu Attri / B. Sumeeth Reddy	21; 18	21; 17
3	(South Korea) (India)	Lee Dong-keun; Kashyap Parupalli	17; 21	14; 21
4	(South Korea) (India)	Kim Ki-jung / Kim Sa-rang; Pranav Chopra / Akshay Dewalkar	21; 16	21; 16
5	(South Korea) (India)	Hwang Jong-soo; Rajah Menuri Venkata Gurusaidutt	22; 24	13; 21

=== Malaysia vs Germany ===
Malaysia
4
Siri Fort Indoor Stadium Court 4
19 May 2014

Germany
1

			1	2	3
1	(Malaysia) (Germany)	Lee Chong Wei; Marc Zwiebler	21; 14	21; 8
2	(Malaysia) (Germany)	Tan Boon Heong / Tan Wee Kiong; Michael Fuchs / Johannes Schöttler	13; 21	21; 17	21; 18
3	(Malaysia) (Germany)	Chong Wei Feng; Dieter Domke	19; 21	22; 20	23; 21
4	(Malaysia) (Germany)	Goh V Shem / Lim Khim Wah; Peter Kaesbauer / Josche Zurwonne	21; 12	21; 18
5	(Malaysia) (Germany)	Daren Liew; Lukas Schmidt	20; 22	10; 21

=== Malaysia vs Korea ===
Malaysia
3
Siri Fort Indoor Stadium Court 2
21 May 2014

South Korea
2

			1	2	3
1	(Malaysia) (South Korea)	Lee Chong Wei; Son Wan-ho	21; 17	21; 17
2	(Malaysia) (South Korea)	Hoon Thien How / Tan Boon Heong; Lee Yong-dae / Yoo Yeon-seong	19; 21	19; 21
3	(Malaysia) (South Korea)	Chong Wei Feng; Lee Dong-keun	19; 21	21; 17	21; 14
4	(Malaysia) (South Korea)	Goh V Shem / Tan Wee Kiong; Kim Ki-jung / Kim Sa-rang	21; 17	21; 19
5	(Malaysia) (South Korea)	Goh Soon Huat; Hwang Jong-soo	21; 23	15; 21

=== Germany vs India ===
Germany
2
Siri Fort Indoor Stadium Court 4
21 May 2014

India
3

			1	2	3
1	(Germany) (India)	Marc Zwiebler; Srikanth Kidambi	18; 21	21; 18	18; 21
2	(Germany) (India)	Michael Fuchs / Johannes Schöttler; Manu Attri / B. Sumeeth Reddy	21; 15	21; 6
3	(Germany) (India)	Dieter Domke; Kashyap Parupalli	23; 21	14; 21	21; 14
4	(Germany) (India)	Peter Kaesbauer / Josche Zurwonne; Pranav Chopra / Akshay Dewalkar	9; 21	21; 17	19; 21
5	(Germany) (India)	Lukas Schmidt; Rajah Menuri Venkata Gurusaidutt	21; 14	19; 21	19; 21

== Group D ==
Team	Pts	Pld	W	L	MF	MA
China	6	3	3	0	15	0
France	4	3	2	1	6	9
Chinese Taipei	2	3	1	2	6	9
Russia	0	3	0	3	3	12

=== China vs France ===
China
5
Siri Fort Indoor Stadium Court 3
18 May 2014

France
0

			1	2	3
1	(China) (France)	Chen Long; Brice Leverdez	21; 12	21; 8
2	(China) (France)	Du Pengyu; Lucas Corvee	21; 15	21; 9
3	(China) (France)	Fu Haifeng / Zhang Nan; Gaetan Mittelheisser / Bastian Kersaudy	21; 16	21; 14
4	(China) (France)	Lin Dan; Lucas Claerbout	21; 5	21; 11
5	(China) (France)	Liu Xiaolong / Qiu Zihan; Baptiste Careme / Lucas Corvee	21; 14	21; 18

=== Chinese Taipei vs Russia ===
Chinese Taipei
4
Siri Fort Indoor Stadium Court 4
18 May 2014

Russia
1

			1	2	3
1	(Chinese Taipei) (Russia)	Chou Tien-chen; Vladimir Ivanov	18; 21	17; 21
2	(Chinese Taipei) (Russia)	Chen Hung-ling / Lu Chia-pin; Rodion Kargaev / Anatoliy Yartsev	21; 19	21; 18
3	(Chinese Taipei) (Russia)	Hsu Jen-hao; Vladimir Malkov	21; 13	23; 21
4	(Chinese Taipei) (Russia)	Lee Sheng-mu / Tsai Chia-hsin; Vladimir Ivanov / Ivan Sozonov	21; 19	14; 21	21; 10
5	(Chinese Taipei) (Russia)	Lin Yu-hsien; Anton Ivanov	21; 11	21; 11

=== China vs Russia ===
China
5
Siri Fort Indoor Stadium Court 2
19 May 2014

Russia
0

			1	2	3
1	(China) (Russia)	Chen Long; Vladimir Malkov	21; 12	21; 15
2	(China) (Russia)	Du Pengyu; Anton Ivanov	21; 8	21; 8
3	(China) (Russia)	Tian Houwei; Anatoliy Yartsev	21; 18	21; 6
4	(China) (Russia)	Liu Xiaolong / Qiu Zihan; Vladimir Ivanov / Ivan Sozonov	19; 21	21; 17	21; 18
5	(China) (Russia)	Chai Biao / Hong Wei; Rodion Kargaev / Anatoliy Yartsev	21; 17	21; 10

=== Chinese Taipei vs France ===
Chinese Taipei
2
Siri Fort Indoor Stadium Court 4
19 May 2014

France
3

			1	2	3
1	(Chinese Taipei) (France)	Chou Tien-chen; Brice Leverdez	19; 21	21; 11	19; 21
2	(Chinese Taipei) (France)	Hsu Jen-hao; Lucas Corvee	17; 21	21; 16	21; 10
3	(Chinese Taipei) (France)	Liao Min-chun / Tseng Min-hao; Bastian Kersaudy / Gaetan Mittelheisser	22; 20	20; 13
4	(Chinese Taipei) (France)	Shih Kuei-chun; Thomas Rouxel	22; 20	19; 21	19; 21
5	(Chinese Taipei) (France)	Lee Sheng-mu / Tsai Chia-hsin; Lucas Corvee / Brice Leverdez	14; 21	21; 13	14; 21

=== China vs Chinese Taipei ===
China
5
Siri Fort Indoor Stadium Court 2
20 May 2014

Chinese Taipei
0

			1	2	3
1	(China) (Chinese Taipei)	Chen Long; Chou Tien-chen	21; 14	21; 19
2	(China) (Chinese Taipei)	Chai Biao / Hong Wei; Lee Sheng-mu / Tsai Chia-hsin	21; 19	14; 21	21; 17
3	(China) (Chinese Taipei)	Du Pengyu; Hsu Jen-hao	21; 11	21; 13
4	(China) (Chinese Taipei)	Fu Haifeng / Zhang Nan; Chen Hung-ling / Lu Chia-bin	21; 15	21; 14
5	(China) (Chinese Taipei)	Lin Dan; Lin Yu-hsien	19; 21	21; 13	21; 14

=== Russia vs France ===
Russia
2
Siri Fort Indoor Stadium Court 4
20 May 2014

France
3

			1	2	3
1	(Russia) (France)	Vladimir Ivanov; Brice Leverdez	21; 11	17; 21	21; 8
2	(Russia) (France)	Vladimir Malkov; Lucas Corvee	17; 21	14; 21
3	(Russia) (France)	Rodion Kargaev / Anatoliy Yartsev; Baptiste Careme / Bastian Kersaudy	21; 15	15; 21	16; 21
4	(Russia) (France)	Anton Ivanov; Thomas Rouxel	9; 21	14; 21
5	(Russia) (France)	Vladimir Ivanov / Ivan Sozonov; Lucas Corvee / Brice Leverdez	21; 10	21; 12
