= Fu Mingtian =

Singaporean badminton player

Fu Mingtian 伏明天
Personal information
- Born: 27 June 1990 (age 36) Wuhan, Hubei China
- Height: 1.65 m (5 ft 5 in)
- Weight: 56 kg (123 lb)

Sport
- Country: Singapore
- Sport: Badminton
- Handedness: Right

Women's singles
- Highest ranking: 25 (12 January 2012)
- BWF profile
Medal record
Women's badminton
Representing Singapore
Commonwealth Games
Bronze medal – third place	2014 Glasgow	Mixed team
Southeast Asian Games
Gold medal – first place	2011 Jakarta–Palembang	Women's singles
Silver medal – second place	2007 Nakhon Ratchasima	Women's team
Bronze medal – third place	2009 Vientiane	Women's team
Bronze medal – third place	2011 Jakarta–Palembang	Women's team
World Junior Championships
Gold medal – first place	2008 Pune	Girls' doubles
Bronze medal – third place	2007 Waitakere City	Mixed team
Asian Junior Championships
Bronze medal – third place	2007 Kuala Lumpur	Girls' singles
Bronze medal – third place	2007 Kuala Lumpur	Girls' doubles

Fu Mingtian (Chinese: 伏明天; born 27 June 1990) is a Chinese-born Singaporean badminton player.

== Early life ==
Fu came to Singapore in 2003 and became a Singapore citizen in 2007 under the Foreign Sports Talent Scheme.

== Career ==
Fu became the first female Singaporean player to win the Southeast Asian Games women's singles badminton gold medal in 2011 Southeast Asian Games in Indonesia. She beat second-seed Ratchanok Intanon of Thailand 21–12, 21–18 en route to the final match. In the finals, she beat home favourite Adriyanti Firdasari 14–21, 21–12, 22–20. Despite Fu's achievements, she was not selected for the 2012 Summer Olympics and Gu Juan was selected.

After retirement from competitive badminton, Fu became a coach with the Singapore Badminton Association. She resigned from her coach position in 2017.

== Personal life ==
In 2017, Fu returned to China to marry another former Chinese shuttler who played for the Xiamen team. She expects to settle down in Xuzhou city, Jiangsu where her fiancé is from.

== Awards ==
Fu was awarded Singapore's Sportswoman of the Year award in 2012.

== Achievements ==
=== Southeast Asian Games ===
Women's singles
Year	Venue	Opponent	Score	Result
2011	Istora Senayan; Jakarta, Indonesia	(Indonesia) Adriyanti Firdasari	14–21, 21–12, 22–20	Gold

=== BWF World Junior Championships ===
Girls' doubles
Year	Venue	Partner	Opponent	Score	Result
2008	Shree Shiv Chhatrapati Badminton Hall; Pune, India	(Singapore) Yao Lei	(China) Xie Jing (China) Zhong Qianxin	21–19, 21–17	Gold

=== Asian Junior Championships ===
Girls' singles
Year	Venue	Opponent	Score	Result
2007	Stadium Juara; Kuala Lumpur, Malaysia	(China) Liu Xin	22–24, 11–21	Bronze

Girls' doubles
Year	Venue	Partner	Opponent	Score	Result
2007	Stadium Juara; Kuala Lumpur, Malaysia	(Singapore) Yao Lei	(Indonesia) Richi Puspita Dili (Indonesia) Debby Susanto		Bronze

=== BWF Grand Prix ===
The BWF Grand Prix had two levels, the Grand Prix and Grand Prix Gold. It was a series of badminton tournaments sanctioned by the Badminton World Federation (BWF) and played between 2007 and 2017.

Women's singles
Year	Tournament	Opponent	Score	Result
2011	Vietnam Open	(Japan) Kaori Imabeppu	21–18, 16–21, 21–8	(gold) Winner

BWF Grand Prix Gold tournament
BWF Grand Prix tournament

=== BWF International Challenge/Series ===
Women's singles
Year	Tournament	Opponent	Score	Result
2007	Ballarat International	(Australia) Huang Chia-chi	8–21, 21–13, 21–15	(gold) Winner
2007	Waikato International	(Singapore) Gu Juan	21–14, 21–17	(gold) Winner
2012	Singapore International	(Singapore) Xing Aiying	10–21, 8–21	(silver) Runner-up

Women's doubles
Year	Tournament	Partner	Opponent	Score	Result
2005	Croatian International	(Singapore) Zhang Beiwen	(Singapore) Frances Liu (Singapore) Shinta Mulia Sari	Walkover	(silver) Runner-up
2013	Singapore International	(Singapore) Vanessa Neo	(Singapore) Shinta Mulia Sari (Singapore) Yao Lei	21–19, 15–21, 13–21	(silver) Runner-up

BWF International Challenge tournament
BWF International Series tournament
