= Ratchanok Intanon =

Thai badminton player (born 1995)

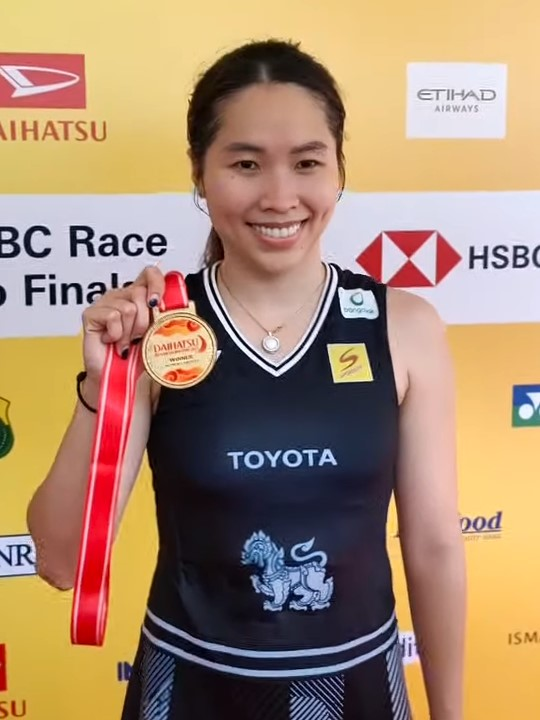
- Ratchanok at the 2025 Indonesia Masters

Personal information
- Nickname: May
- Born: 5 February 1995 (age 31) Yasothon, Thailand
- Height: 1.69 m (5 ft 7 in)
- Weight: 58 kg (128 lb)

Sport
- Country: Thailand
- Sport: Badminton
- Handedness: Right

Women's singles
- Career record: 603 wins, 280 losses
- Highest ranking: 1 (21 April 2016)
- Current ranking: 6 (17 November 2026)
- BWF profile
Medal record
Women's badminton
Representing Thailand
World Championships
Gold medal – first place	2013 Guangzhou	Women's singles
Bronze medal – third place	2019 Basel	Women's singles
Sudirman Cup
Bronze medal – third place	2013 Kuala Lumpur	Mixed team
Bronze medal – third place	2017 Gold Coast	Mixed team
Bronze medal – third place	2019 Nanning	Mixed team
Uber Cup
Silver medal – second place	2018 Bangkok	Women's team
Bronze medal – third place	2012 Wuhan	Women's team
Bronze medal – third place	2020 Aarhus	Women's team
Bronze medal – third place	2022 Bangkok	Women's team
Asian Games
Silver medal – second place	2010 Guangzhou	Women's team
Bronze medal – third place	2018 Jakarta–Palembang	Women's team
Asian Championships
Gold medal – first place	2015 Wuhan	Women's singles
Asia Team Championships
Bronze medal – third place	2016 Hyderabad	Women's team
SEA Games
Gold medal – first place	2011 Jakarta–Palembang	Women's team
Gold medal – first place	2015 Singapore	Women's team
Gold medal – first place	2019 Philippines	Women's team
Gold medal – first place	2025 Thailand	Women's team
Gold medal – first place	2025 Thailand	Women's singles
Silver medal – second place	2009 Vientiane	Women's singles
Bronze medal – third place	2009 Vientiane	Women's team
Bronze medal – third place	2011 Jakarta–Palembang	Women's singles
World Junior Championships
Gold medal – first place	2009 Alor Setar	Girls' singles
Gold medal – first place	2010 Guadalajara	Girls' singles
Gold medal – first place	2011 Taipei	Girls' singles
Bronze medal – third place	2009 Alor Setar	Mixed team
Asian Junior Championships
Bronze medal – third place	2009 Kuala Lumpur	Mixed team
Bronze medal – third place	2010 Kuala Lumpur	Girls' doubles
Bronze medal – third place	2010 Kuala Lumpur	Mixed team

Ratchanok Intanon (Thai: รัชนก อินทนนท์, RTGS: Ratchanok Inthanon, pronounced [rát.t͡ɕʰā.nók ʔīn.tʰā.nōn]; born 5 February 1995) is a Thai badminton player. She became the first player to win three consecutive World Junior Championships titles from 2009 to 2011. In 2013, at age 18, she became the youngest-ever World Champion in the women's singles. Ratchanok won the gold medal at the 2015 Asian Championships.

Ratchanok has been a frequent competitor in the SEA Games, winning the individual gold medal in the women's singles.Thailand secured four gold medals in the women's team event at the SEA Games.

== Career ==
=== 2008–2010 ===
In 2008, Ratchanok entered the international circuit at the age of 13. The first international tournament she played was the Laos International series, in which she played both singles and doubles. She lost the singles final to Vietnam's Lê Ngọc Nguyên Nhung. She won her first individual international title in 2009 by winning the Vietnam International Challenge when she was 14. She made history by becoming the youngest-ever champion at the 2009 World Junior Championships at 14 in Malaysia by beating her compatriot Porntip Buranaprasertsuk. She reached the final of the Malaysia International Challenge 2009, losing out to Sapsiree Taerattanachai. She also reached the 2009 SEA Games women's singles final, but lost to her compatriot Salakjit Ponsana.

In 2010, at the age of 15, Ratchanok successfully defended her title at the World Junior Championships in Mexico by beating Misaki Matsutomo. Her successful run continued after she won the Smiling Fish International, beating teammate Rawinda Prajongjai. She won back-to-back Grand Prix tournaments by winning the Vietnam Open Grand Prix beating China's Zhou Hui and the Indonesia Grand Prix Gold after defeating Cheng Shao-chieh from Chinese Taipei. In the 2010 Guangzhou Asian Games, she won a silver medal as a member of the women's team. In the final, she lost to Wang Xin, at that time world number 1.

=== 2011–2012 ===
Ratchanok participated in BWF World Championships and lost in the third round to eventual winner Wang Yihan. She was a finalist at the Chinese Taipei Open, where she was defeated by Sung Ji-hyun. She became the most successful player ever in individual events at the World Junior Championships, winning the girls' singles title for the third straight time by defeating Indonesia's Elyzabeth Purwaningtyas. She won the India Open Grand Prix Gold where she received a walkover against Porntip Buranaprasertsuk in final. She was also a member of the women's team that defeated Indonesia in the final of the 2011 SEA Games. She herself was a bronze medalist in singles event, where she lost in the semi-finals to Singapore's Fu Mingtian.

In 2012, Ratchanok, at 16 years of age, was awarded the Best Female Athlete Award in Thailand after winning the world junior title for three successive years. She reached the finals of the Thailand Open but lost to Saina Nehwal. After defeating the higher-seeded Juliane Schenk of Germany in round of 16, she reached the quarter-finals of the 2012 Olympic Games where she lost to second seed Wang Xin despite leading 21–17 and 16–9 in the second game. She entered the finals of a Superseries tournament for the first time in the China Open but lost to Li Xuerui 12–21, 9–21. She qualified for the 2012 BWF Superseries Finals and won all of her group matches in straight games against Juliane Schenk, Tine Baun and Saina Nehwal. She lost in the semi-finals there to Wang Shixian. She finished the year as world number 9.

=== 2013 ===
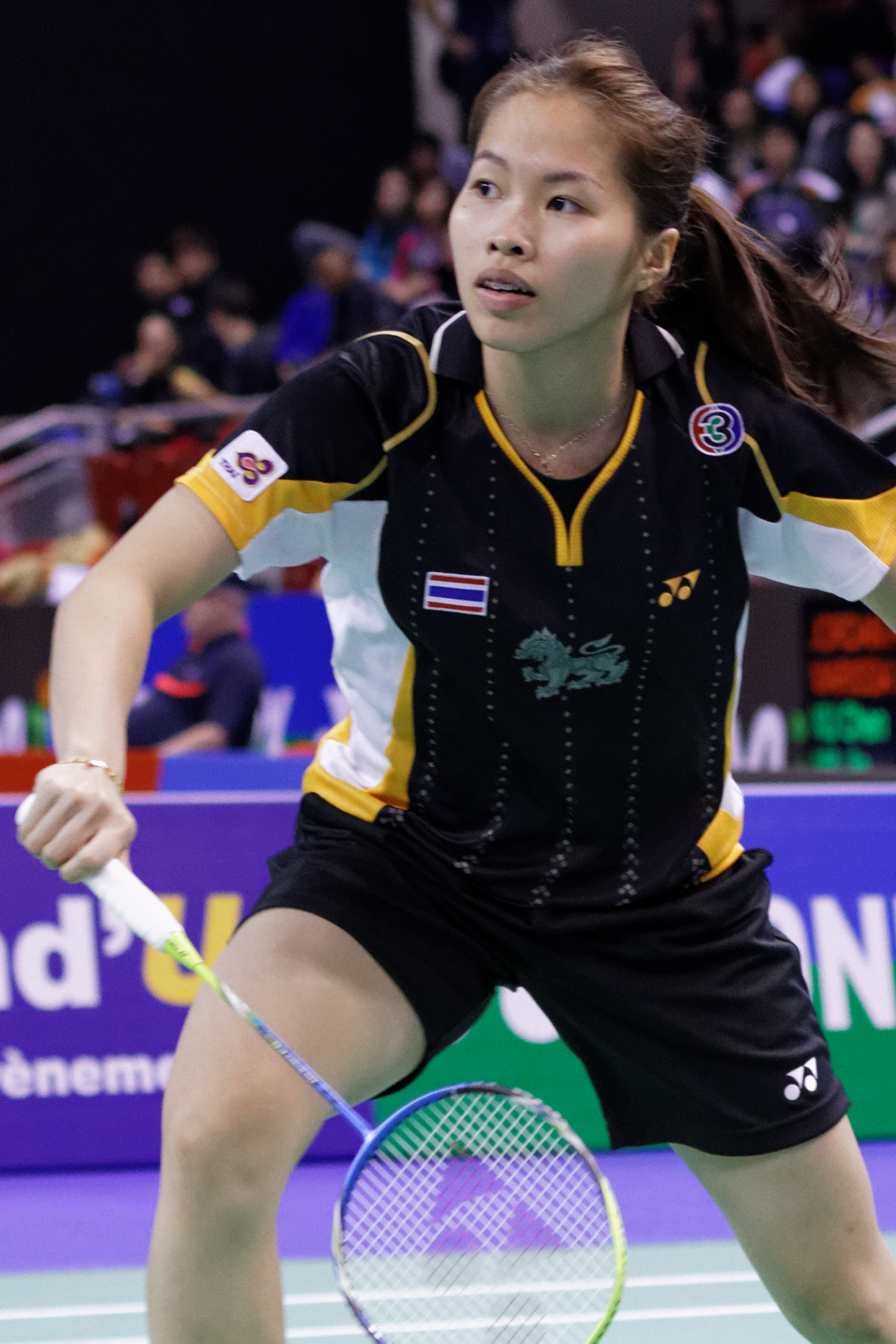
Ratchanok at the 2013 French Open

Ratchanok reached the finals of the All England Open, losing to Tine Rasmussen 14–21, 21–16, 10–21. She is the youngest ever singles finalist at the All England Open. She lost in the final of the Swiss Open Grand Prix Gold after being defeated by Wang Shixian. She won her first Superseries tournament by beating Juliane Schenk 22–20, 21–14 in the India Open to become the youngest-ever Superseries winner at the age of 18 years, 2 months and 22 days (she held this record for 6 months until Akane Yamaguchi won the 2013 Japan Super Series at the age of 16). She again reached the finals of the Thailand Open, winning the title after beating Busanan Ongbamrungphan to become the first Thai ever to win the women's singles title at the Thailand Open since it was first held in 1984.

Ratchanok withdrew from both the Indonesia and Singapore Opens to recover from a foot injury and prepare for the BWF World Championships. In World Championships in August, she was seeded fourth. She reached the quarter-finals of this tournament for the first time, where she defeated Carolina Marín in a very hard-fought encounter. Her semi-finals path was relatively easy, where she won against P. V. Sindhu in two games. In the final, she won the title, beating world number 1 and Olympic gold medalist Li Xuerui 22–20, 18–21, 21–14. She was the first-ever Thai player to be the World Champion and was also the youngest singles World Champion ever at the age of 18. She became the world champion while still being eligible to play in the World Junior Championships that year. After the World Championships, she injured her back and failed to qualify for the Super Series Finals, finishing the year as the world number three. She was awarded the "2013 Best Females Athletes Award" from the Thailand Sports Authority.

=== 2014 ===
In 2014, Ratchanok reached the final of the Korea Open for the first time, meeting Wang Yihan and continuing her losing streak against Wang. She was awarded "Best Asian Sporting Icon" by Fox Sports Asia, based on voting from internet fans on its website. She reached the finals of the Indonesia Open but lost to Li Xuerui. She failed to defend her World Championships title after losing in the third round to Minatsu Mitani. She was defeated by Bae Yeon-ju in the quarter-finals of the 2014 Asian Games. She qualified for the Superseries Finals in Dubai but failed to pass the round-robin stage after losing group matches against Tai Tzu-ying and Akane Yamaguchi. She finished the 2014 year as world number 6.

=== 2015 ===
In 2015, Ratchanok made a comeback by reaching the final of the India Open for the second time but lost to her opponent Saina Nehwal. A month later, she became the first Thai singles player to win the Asia Championships by defeating Li Xuerui in the final 20–22, 23–21, 21–12 in China. It was the first time that Ratchanok had beaten Li since the final of the 2013 World Championships. In June, she won her first Superseries Premier title by beating Yui Hashimoto of Japan in straight games at the Indonesia Open. However, at the BWF World Championships, she had to retire from court when 8–5 up in the decider against Lindaweni Fanetri in the round of 16 from cramps.

Ratchanok won a gold medal with the Thailand women's team at the 2015 SEA Games in Singapore. After the Indonesia Open, she did not reach the final of any tournaments but earned enough points to qualify for the Dubai World Superseries Finals. In the group stage, she lost to Wang Yihan, but won two other matches against Wang Shixian and Sung Ji-hyun, progressing to the semi-finals. She lost to Wang Yihan there, which brought their head-to-head record to 0–12. She finished the 2015 season at world number seven.

=== 2016 ===
In 2016, Ratchanok won the Thailand Masters, a second Grand Prix Gold tournament in Thailand, by beating Sun Yu in the final. She won the India Open for the second time by beating Li Xuerui in the final. In the Malaysia Open the week after, she defeated Wang Yihan for the first time by beating her in the semi-final. In the final, she beat Tai Tzu-ying to earn the Malaysia Open title for the first time. This was the first time she had won two consecutive Superseries tournaments; Ratchanok then became the first singles player to win three Superseries in three consecutive weeks by winning the Singapore Super Series, defeating Sun Yu in the final. By winning three Superseries in a row, she also rose to the number 1 spot in the world rankings, becoming the first Thai to achieve this feat. Her winning streak ended after she lost to Sayaka Sato in the Asian Championships.

Ratchanok qualified for the 2016 Summer Olympics and was the Thai flag bearer. At the Olympics she failed to pass the round of 16, losing to Akane Yamaguchi, in two games: 19–21, 16–21. After the Olympics, she suffered a knee injury which forced her to retire from subsequent tournaments. In the Superseries Finals, Ratchanok lost in straight games to Sung Ji-hyun and Tai Tzu-ying, and retired injured against He Bingjiao. She finished 2016 at a world ranking of five.

=== 2017 ===
Ratchanok played in her first tournament of 2017 in March, the All England Open. She made her way to the quarter-finals, where she faced off against world no. 2 Carolina Marín. She won after being down 11–18 in the rubber set but won 10 straight points to close out the match. After defeating Akane Yamaguchi in the semi-finals, she was defeated by Tai Tzu-ying 16–21, 20–22.

Ratchanok later in the year took the Thailand Open title, beating compatriot Busanan Ongbamrungphan in the final. She also won the New Zealand Open beating Saena Kawakami. She was disappointed in the World Championships when she lost to Chen Yufei in the quarter-finals. After defeating Sung Ji-hyun and Tai Tzu-ying in the Denmark Open, Ratchanok beat Akane Yamaguchi in the final in three games after being 16–19 down in the final game; she won the game 21–19. She said that she dedicated the title to Thailand's king, Bhumibol Adulyadej, who had died the year before. She qualified for the season-ending Superseries Finals, where she defeated Sung Ji-hyun and Tai Tzu-ying and lost the third group match to Chen Yufei. She was defeated in the semi-finals by Akane Yamaguchi in three games after she was leading in the final game.

=== 2018 ===
At the beginning of the year, Ratchanok won the Malaysia Masters Super 500, beating Tai Tzu-ying in the finals, winning 24–22 in the third set. In the World Championships, she lost to Saina Nehwal in the third round. At the Asian Games, Ratchanok made it to the quarter-final stage before losing out to Nehwal. She made the finals of the Hong Kong Open, losing to Nozomi Okuhara. She qualified for the BWF World Tour Finals, where she ended her losing streak against Chen Yufei. She lost to Nozomi Okuhara but defeated Canada's Michelle Li to secure a semi-finals spot. She lost in the semi-finals to eventual gold medalist P. V. Sindhu. She finished the year at world no. 8.

=== 2019 - 2020 ===
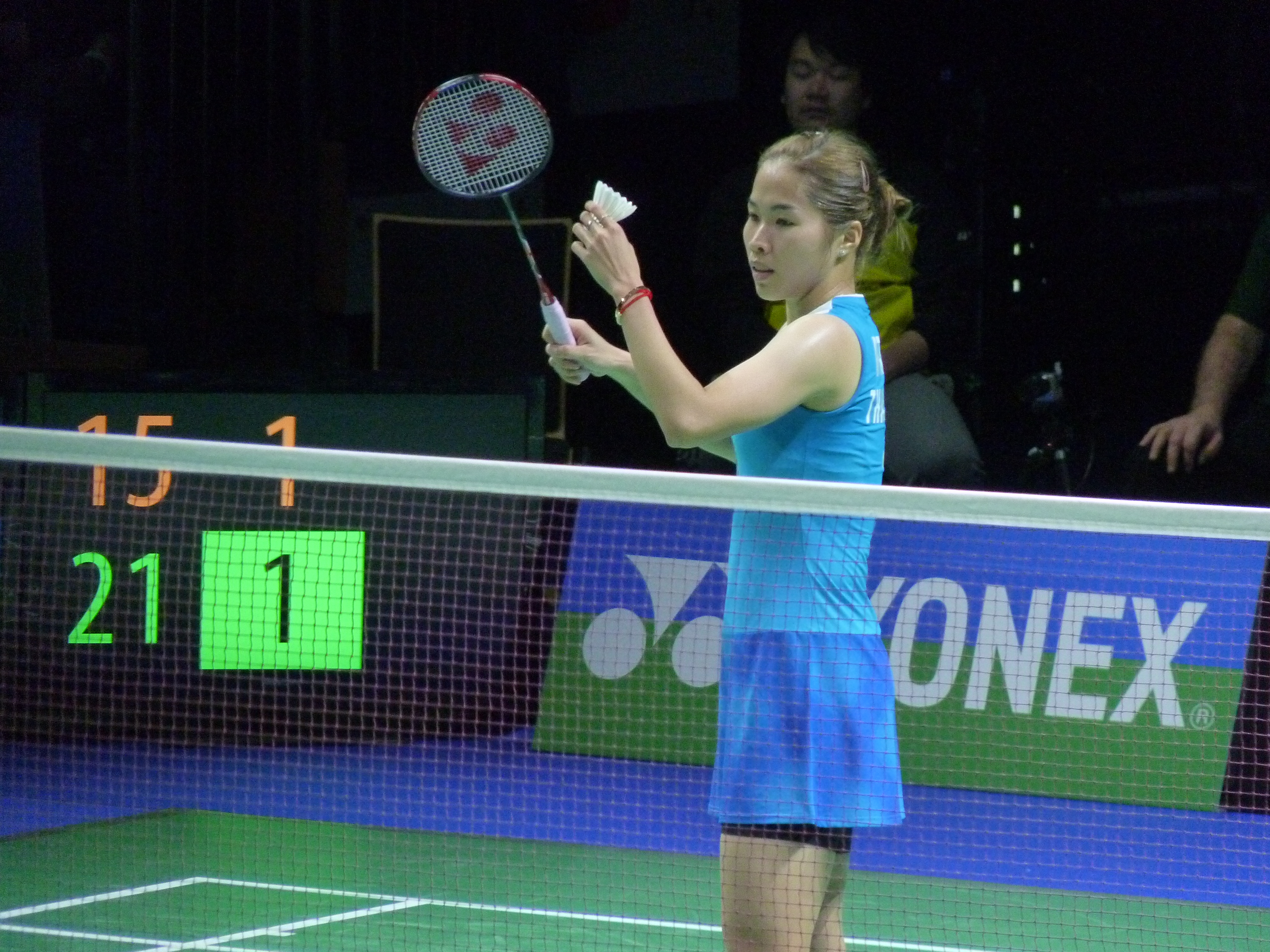
Ratchanok at the 2019 German Open

In 2019, Ratchanok won the Malaysia Masters Super 500, defending her title by winning in straight games for all her matches, including the final where she beat Carolina Marín. At the final of German Open Super 300, she lost to Akane Yamaguchi in three games, losing 23–25 in the deciding game. She then won her third India Open title by beating He Bingjiao. This was Ratchanok's first victory over her. She lost the final of Thailand Open to Chen Yufei in two games. She won the bronze medal at Basel World Championship after losing to Nozomi Okuhara in the semi-finals. Ratchanok was one point away from winning the Korea Open against He Bingjiao, but she saved four match points and won the next game.

Ratchanok failed an out-of-competition drug test in April but was not banned by the BWF. The BWF statement reads: "The ethics hearing panel determined Ms. Ratchanok Intanon committed an anti-doping rule violation, but as the athlete was able to demonstrate that her adverse analytical finding was related to the ingestion of meat contaminated with clenbuterol, she was found to bear no fault or negligence for the violation, and thus no period of ineligibility has been imposed on her." She lost again to Chen Yufei in the final of the Hong Kong Open. She participated in the World Tour Finals, where she beat Busanan Ongbamrungphan, lost to Tai Tzu-ying, and lost to Nozomi Okuhara in the last group match. Ratchanok's first title of 2020 came when she won the Indonesia Masters title by beating Carolina Marín in three game.

=== 2021–present ===
For 2021 season, Ratchanok managed to reach one final in Indonesia Open where she lost to An Se-young in the finals. Ratchanok also manage to qualify for 2020 Olympics which she excelled in the group stage but got knocked out at the round of 16 to Tai Tzu-ying in three sets of 21–14, 18–21, 18–21. The next year, Indonesia proved to be her strong domain as she excelled to the final again, this time in Indonesia Masters. In the final, she fought in a grueling three games match where she ended up losing to Chen Yufei. She manage to avenge this lost with a win against Chen in Malaysia Open with another grueling three sets between them in the process to the title.

In July 2023, Ratchanok advanced to her next final in Canada Open after one year and a half drought in which she lost to Akane Yamaguchi. Three months later in September, Ratchanok was scheduled to compete at the Hangzhou 2022 Asian Games. She withdrew from the competition and the rest of the 2023 tour due to the ankle injury she suffered in the Hong Kong Open. After a 3-month hiatus, Ratchanok returned to the international tour at the Malaysia Open in January 2024. She then won the Spain Masters in March. Ratchanok competed for the fourth time at the Olympics in the 2024 Paris, but again failed to win a medal after losing in the quarter-finals to Gregoria Mariska Tunjung. In October, she finished as a finalist at the Arctic Open.

In 2025, Ratchanok started the year with a good performance by winning Indonesia Masters against a young player from South Korea, Sim Yu-jin. Ratchanok won her second title late in the year when she beat Gregoria Mariska Tunjung, who were in the final for Japan Masters for three straight years, in straight games. In SEA games, Ratchanok was an instrumental piece for the women's team seventh straight gold medal triumph. She also gained her first individual gold medal in the women's singles, beating her compatriot, Supanida Katethong in the final.

== Honors and awards ==
Ratchanok has won many awards and honors in recognition of her achievements.

Organization	Award	Year
The International Olympic Committee (IOC)	IOC Sport-Inspiring Young People Trophy	2010
Badminton World Federation (BWF)	BWF Most Promising Player of The Year 2009 – Eddie Choong Trophy	2009

=== Records currently held ===
- Youngest ever singles champion at the BWF World Championships (2013, age of 18 years, 6 months and 6 days).
- Youngest ever champion of the BWF World Junior Championships (2009, age of 14).
- First ever three-time champion in a single discipline of the BWF World Junior Championships (2009, 2010, 2011).
- Youngest ever singles finalist of the All England Open Badminton Championships (2013, age of 18).
- First ever singles player to win three Superseries titles in three consecutive weeks.
- First ever Thai badminton player ranked world number 1.

=== Royal decorations ===
- 2012 – Member (Fifth Class) of The Most Admirable Order of the Direkgunabhorn
- 2013 – Commander (Third Class) of The Most Admirable Order of the Direkgunabhorn
- 2016 – Dame Commander (Second Class) of The Most Admirable Order of the Direkgunabhorn

== Achievements ==
=== BWF World Championships ===
Women's singles
Year	Venue	Opponent	Score	Result	Ref.
2013	Tianhe Sports Center, Guangzhou, China	(China) Li Xuerui	22–20, 18–21, 21–14	Gold	
2019	St. Jakobshalle, Basel, Switzerland	(Japan) Nozomi Okuhara	21–17, 18–21, 15–21	Bronze	

=== Asian Championships ===
Women's singles
Year	Venue	Opponent	Score	Result	Ref.
2015	Wuhan Sports Center Gymnasium, Wuhan, China	(China) Li Xuerui	20–22, 23–21, 21–12	Gold	

=== SEA Games ===
Women's singles
Year	Venue	Opponent	Score	Result	Ref.
2009	Gym Hall 1, National Sports Complex, Vientiane, Laos	(Thailand) Salakjit Ponsana	14–21, 21–18, 10–21	Silver	
2011	Istora Gelora Bung Karno, Jakarta, Indonesia	(Singapore) Fu Mingtian	17–21, 21–19, 20–22	Bronze	
2025	Gymnasium 4, Thammasat University Rangsit Campus, Pathum Thani, Thailand	(Thailand) Supanida Katethong	21–19, 21–7	Gold	

=== BWF World Junior Championships ===
Girls' singles
Year	Venue	Opponent	Score	Result	Ref.
2009	Stadium Sultan Abdul Halim, Alor Setar, Malaysia	(Thailand) Porntip Buranaprasertsuk	21–15, 21–23, 21–10	Gold	
2010	Domo del Code Jalisco, Guadalajara, Mexico	(Japan) Misaki Matsutomo	21–13, 16–21, 21–10	Gold	
2011	Taoyuan Arena, Taoyuan City, Taipei, Taiwan	(Indonesia) Elyzabeth Purwaningtyas	21–6, 18–21, 21–13	Gold	

=== Asian Junior Championships ===
Girls' doubles
Year	Venue	Partner	Opponent	Score	Result	Ref.
2010	Stadium Juara; Kuala Lumpur, Malaysia	(Thailand) Pijitjan Wangpaiboonkj	(China) Ou Dongni (China) Bao Yixin	7–21, 17–21	Bronze	

=== BWF World Tour (9 titles, 10 runners-up) ===
The BWF World Tour, which was announced on 19 March 2017 and implemented in 2018, is a series of elite badminton tournaments sanctioned by the Badminton World Federation (BWF). The BWF World Tour is divided into levels of World Tour Finals, Super 1000, Super 750, Super 500, Super 300, and the BWF Tour Super 100.

Women's singles
Year	Tournament	Level	Opponent	Score	Result	Ref.
2018	Malaysia Masters	Super 500	(Chinese Taipei) Tai Tzu-ying	21–16, 14–21, 24–22	(gold) Winner	
2018	Hong Kong Open	Super 500	(Japan) Nozomi Okuhara	19–21, 22–24	(silver) Runner-up	
2019	Malaysia Masters	Super 500	(Spain) Carolina Marín	21–9, 22–20	(gold) Winner	
2019	German Open	Super 300	(Japan) Akane Yamaguchi	21–16, 14–21, 23–25	(silver) Runner-up	
2019	India Open	Super 500	(China) He Bingjiao	21–15, 21–14	(gold) Winner	
2019	Thailand Open	Super 500	(China) Chen Yufei	20–22, 18–21	(silver) Runner-up	
2019	Korea Open	Super 500	(China) He Bingjiao	21–18, 22–24, 17–21	(silver) Runner-up	
2019	Hong Kong Open	Super 500	(China) Chen Yufei	18–21, 21–13, 13–21	(silver) Runner-up	
2020	Indonesia Masters	Super 500	(Spain) Carolina Marín	21–19, 11–21, 21–18	(gold) Winner	
2021	Indonesia Open	Super 1000	(South Korea) An Se-young	17–21, 20–22	(silver) Runner-up	
2022	Indonesia Masters	Super 500	(China) Chen Yufei	16–21, 21–18, 15–21	(silver) Runner-up	
2022	Malaysia Open	Super 750	(China) Chen Yufei	21–15, 13–21, 21–16	(gold) Winner	
2023	Canada Open	Super 500	(Japan) Akane Yamaguchi	19–21, 16–21	(silver) Runner-up	
2024	Spain Masters	Super 300	(Thailand) Supanida Katethong	21–12, 21–9	(gold) Winner	
2024	Arctic Open	Super 500	(China) Han Yue	10–21, 13–21	(silver) Runner-up	
2025	Indonesia Masters	Super 500	(South Korea) Sim Yu-jin	21–18, 21–17	(gold) Winner	
2025	Japan Masters	Super 500	(Indonesia) Gregoria Mariska Tunjung	21–16, 22–20	(gold) Winner	
2026	Malaysia Masters	Super 500	(China) Chen Yufei	21–17, 21–15	(gold) Winner	
2026	Arctic Open	Super 500	(Denmark) Mia Blichfeldt	17–21, 13–21	(silver) Runner-up	

=== BWF Superseries (6 titles, 6 runners-up) ===
The BWF Superseries, which was launched on 14 December 2006 and implemented in 2007, was a series of elite badminton tournaments, sanctioned by the Badminton World Federation (BWF). BWF Superseries levels were Superseries and Superseries Premier. A season of Superseries consisted of twelve tournaments around the world that had been introduced since 2011. Successful players were invited to the Superseries Finals, which were held at the end of each year.

Women's singles
Year	Tournament	Opponent	Score	Result	Ref.
2012	China Open	(China) Li Xuerui	12–21, 9–21	(silver) Runner-up	
2013	All England Open	(Denmark) Tine Baun	15–21, 21–16, 10–21	(silver) Runner-up	
2013	India Open	(Germany) Juliane Schenk	22–20, 21–14	(gold) Winner	
2014	Korea Open	(China) Wang Yihan	13–21, 19–21	(silver) Runner-up	
2014	Indonesia Open	(China) Li Xuerui	13–21, 13–21	(silver) Runner-up	
2015	India Open	(India) Saina Nehwal	16–21, 14–21	(silver) Runner-up	
2015	Indonesia Open	(Japan) Yui Hashimoto	21–11, 21–10	(gold) Winner	
2016	India Open	(China) Li Xuerui	21–17, 21–18	(gold) Winner	
2016	Malaysia Open	(Chinese Taipei) Tai Tzu-ying	21–14, 21–15	(gold) Winner	
2016	Singapore Open	(China) Sun Yu	18–21, 21–11, 21–14	(gold) Winner	
2017	All England Open	(Chinese Taipei) Tai Tzu-ying	16–21, 20–22	(silver) Runner-up	
2017	Denmark Open	(Japan) Akane Yamaguchi	14–21, 21–15, 21–19	(gold) Winner	

BWF Super Series Premier tournament
BWF Super Series tournament

=== BWF Grand Prix (7 titles, 3 runners-up) ===
The BWF Grand Prix had two levels, the Grand Prix and Grand Prix Gold. It was a series of badminton tournaments sanctioned by the Badminton World Federation (BWF) and played between 2007 and 2017.

Women's singles
Year	Tournament	Opponent	Score	Result	Ref.
2010	Vietnam Open	(China) Zhou Hui	21–17, 22–20	(gold) Winner	
2010	Indonesia Grand Prix Gold	(Chinese Taipei) Cheng Shao-chieh	21–12, 19–21, 21–16	(gold) Winner	
2011	Chinese Taipei Open	(South Korea) Sung Ji-hyun	20–22, 15–21	(silver) Runner-up	
2011	India Grand Prix Gold	(Thailand) Porntip Buranaprasertsuk	Walkover	(gold) Winner	
2012	Thailand Open	(India) Saina Nehwal	21–19, 15–21, 10–21	(silver) Runner-up	
2013	Swiss Open	(China) Wang Shixian	16–21, 12–21	(silver) Runner-up	
2013	Thailand Open	(Thailand) Busanan Ongbamrungphan	20–22, 21–19, 21–13	(gold) Winner	
2016	Thailand Masters	(China) Sun Yu	21–19, 18–21, 21–17	(gold) Winner	
2017	Thailand Open	(Thailand) Busanan Ongbamrungphan	21–18, 12–21, 21–16	(gold) Winner	
2017	New Zealand Open	(Japan) Saena Kawakami	21–14, 16–21, 21–15	(gold) Winner	

BWF Grand Prix Gold tournament
BWF Grand Prix tournament

=== BWF International Challenge/Series (2 titles, 4 runners-up) ===
Women's singles
Year	Tournament	Opponent	Score	Result	Ref.
2008	Laos International	(Vietnam) Lê Ngọc Nguyên Nhung	22–20, 14–21, 18–21	(silver) Runner-up	
2009	Vietnam International	(Indonesia) Maria Elfira Christina	21–18, 21–14	(gold) Winner	
2009	Malaysia International	(Thailand) Sapsiree Taerattanachai	11–21, 21–19, 20–22	(silver) Runner-up	
2010	Smiling Fish International	(Thailand) Rawinda Prajongjai	21–10, 21–17	(gold) Winner	

Women's doubles
Year	Tournament	Partner	Opponent	Score	Result	Ref.
2010	Smiling Fish International	(Thailand) Pijitjan Wangpaiboonkj	(Thailand) Rodjana Chuthabunditkul (Thailand) Wiranpatch Hongchookeat	20–22, 11–21	(silver) Runner-up	

Mixed doubles
Year	Tournament	Partner	Opponent	Score	Result	Ref.
2008	Laos International	(Thailand) Pisit Poodchalat	(Vietnam) Dương Bảo Đức (Vietnam) Thái Thị Hồng Gấm	16–21, 21–18, 17–21	(silver) Runner-up	

BWF International Challenge tournament
BWF International Series tournament
BWF Future Series tournament

== Personal life ==
Ratchanok is the daughter of Winatchai Intanon of Yasothon and Khamphan Suwansala of Roi Et. She was born in Yasothon Province in the northeast of Thailand, but moved at the age of three months with her parents, who worked at the Banthongyord sweets factory in the Bang Khae District of Bangkok. As a child, she would accompany her parents to work. Factory owner Kamala Thongkorn, worried that she would be burned by boiling water and hot sugar, allowed her to play at the factory's badminton courts. She started playing when she was six years old, and won her first championship at the age of seven.

Ratchanok used her prize money and endorsement fees to aid her parents and brother. Her father opened a food shop with her help. "I wanted to be a national player like my older friends and play for the country, because that was the only way I could help my parents to improve our status and leave poverty," she has said.

Ratchanok trains at the Banthongyord Badminton School. Her coach is Patapol Ngernsrisuk, former Olympian and son of Kamala Thongkorn.

In 2024, she would retire after 2024 Olympics to work fulltime for the Central Police Station as a detective.

== Performance timeline ==
Key

W	Won	F	Finalist	SF	Semi-finalist
QF	Quarter-finalist	#R	Rounds 4, 3, 2, 1	RR	Round-robin stage
Q#	Qualification round	A	Absent	w/d	Withdrew
G	Gold	S	Silver	B	Bronze
NH	Not held	N/A	Not applicable	DNQ	Did not qualify

=== National team ===
- Junior level

Events	2008	2009	2010	2011
Asian Junior Championships	QF	B	B	A
World Junior Championships	5th	B	8th	4th

- Senior level

Team events	2009	2010	2011	2012	2013	2014	2015	2016	2017	2018	2019	2020	2021	2022	2023	2024	2025	2026	Ref
SEA Games	B	NH	G	NH			G	NH	A	NH	G	NH	A	NH	A	NH	G	NH	
Asia Team Championships	NH							B	NH	A	NH	A	NH	A	NH	A	NH	A	
Asian Games	NH	S	NH			QF	NH			B	NH			w/d	NH			QF	
Uber Cup	NH	DNQ	NH	B	NH	QF	NH	QF	NH	S	NH	B	NH	B	NH	QF	NH	QF	
Sudirman Cup	A	NH	GS	NH	B	NH	GS	NH	B	NH	B	NH	A	NH	QF	NH	QF	NH	

=== Individual competitions ===
==== Junior level ====
- Girls' singles

Events	2008	2009	2010	2011	Ref
Asian Junior Championships	A	QF	A		
World Junior Championships	QF	G	G	G	

- Girls' doubles

Events	2010
Asian Junior Championships	B

- Mixed doubles

Events	2008	2009
Asian Junior Championships	3R	QF
World Junior Championships	3R	A

==== Senior level ====
- Women singles

Event	2009	2010	2011	2012	2013	2014	2015	2016	2017	2018	2019	2020	2021	2022	2023	2024	2025	2026	Ref
SEA Games	S	NH	B	NH	A	NH	A	NH	A	NH	A	NH	A	NH	A	NH	G	NH	
Asian Championships	A		1R	2R	QF	2R	G	2R	QF	2R	w/d	NH		A	w/d	1R	2R	1R	
Asian Games	NH	A	NH			QF	NH			QF	NH			w/d	NH				
World Championships	A		3R	NH	G	3R	3R	NH	QF	3R	B	NH	QF	3R	3R	NH	1R	2R	
Olympic Games	NH			QF	NH			2R	NH			QF	NH			QF	NH		

Tournament	BWF Superseries / Grand Prix									BWF World Tour									Best	Ref
Tournament	2009	2010	2011	2012	2013	2014	2015	2016	2017	2018	2019	2020	2021	2022	2023	2024	2025	2026	Best	Ref
Malaysia Open	A		1R	1R	A	1R	2R	W	QF	SF	QF	NH		W	w/d	2R	SF	QF	W ('16, '22)	
India Open	A		QF	1R	W	A	F	W	QF	SF	W	NH		A	2R	1R	2R	SF	W ('13, '16, '19)	
Indonesia Masters	NH	W	2R	A					NH	SF	QF	W	2R	F	QF	QF	W	QF	W ('10, '20, '25)	
Thailand Masters	NH							W	A			QF	NH		w/d	QF	2R	A	W ('16)	
German Open	A		2R	QF	A						F	NH		QF	w/d	QF	A		F ('19)	
All England Open	A		1R	2R	F	SF	QF	QF	F	1R	1R	QF	SF	w/d	1R	1R	1R	1R	F ('13, '17)	
Swiss Open	A		1R	SF	F	A		2R	A			NH	A		1R	1R	w/d	A	F ('13)	
Orléans Masters	NH			NA						A		NH	A				1R	A	1R ('25)	
Thailand Open	2R	NH	1R	F	W	NH	SF	A	W	w/d	F	QF	NH	SF	1R	2R	QF	QF	W ('13, '17)	
Thailand Open	2R	NH	1R	F	W	NH	SF	A	W	w/d	F	SF	NH	SF	1R	2R	QF	QF	W ('13, '17)	
Malaysia Masters	2R	1R	2R	A						W	W	2R	NH	QF	1R	2R	SF	W	W ('18, '19, '26)	
Singapore Open	A		2R	A		QF	QF	W	1R	w/d	QF	NH		1R	2R	w/d	2R	QF	W ('16)	
Indonesia Open	A		2R	1R	A	F	W	1R	1R	QF	QF	NH	F	2R	SF	2R	A	1R	W ('15)	
Australian Open	A		SF	2R	A	2R	1R	QF	2R	A	SF	NH		w/d	SF	A	SF	A	SF ('11, '19, '23, '25)	
Macau Open	1R	1R	1R	A								NH			N/A	1R	A		1R ('09, '10, '11, '24)	
U.S. Open	A		SF	A								NH			SF	A			SF ('11, '23)	
Canada Open	NH	A										NH		A	F	A			F ('23)	
Japan Open	A	1R	1R	QF	A	1R	2R	QF	2R	QF	1R	NH		QF	QF	A	1R	1R	QF ('12, '16, '18, '22, '23)	
China Open	A	QF	QF	F	QF	QF	1R	A	SF	1R	QF	NH			w/d	1R	1R	QF	F ('12)	
Taipei Open	A	QF	F	A			SF	A				NH		A					F ('11)	
Korea Masters	A	QF	A							w/d	A	NH		w/d	A				QF ('10)	
China Masters	A			QF	A					QF	QF	NH			A	1R	2R	2R	QF ('12, '18, '19)	
Vietnam Open	A	W	A									NH		A					W ('10)	
Arctic Open	N/A		NH	N/A								NH			w/d	F	SF	F	F ('24, 26)	
Denmark Open	A		SF	1R	SF	2R	A		W	2R	2R	A	1R	SF	A	2R	1R	w/d	W ('17)	
French Open	A		1R	QF	QF	SF	SF	A	QF	QF	QF	NH	QF	QF	A	1R	1R	1R	SF ('14, '15)	
Hylo Open	A												2R	A					2R ('21)	
Korea Open	A		1R	2R	1R	F	1R	2R	QF	2R	F	NH		QF	A				F ('14, '19)	
Japan Masters	NA														A	2R	W	2R	W ('25)	
Hong Kong Open	A	QF	A	1R	2R	2R	SF	A	SF	F	F	NH			2R	QF	QF	SF	F ('18, '19)	
Syed Modi International	A		W	A	NH	A						NH		A					W ('11)	
Superseries / World Tour Finals	DNQ			SF	DNQ	RR	SF	RR	SF	SF	RR	RR	DNQ	RR	DNQ		SF	Q	SF ('12, '15, '17, '18, '25)	
New Zealand Open	A	NH	N/A	NH	A				W	A		NH			N/A				W ('17)	
Spain Masters	NH									A				NH	A	W	NH		W ('24)	
Year-end ranking	73	21	13	9	3	6	5	5	5	8	5	5	8	6	13	17	7		1	
Tournament	2009	2010	2011	2012	2013	2014	2015	2016	2017	2018	2019	2020	2021	2022	2023	2024	2025	2026	Best	Ref

== Record against selected opponents ==
Record against Year-end Finals finalists, World Championships semi-finalists, and Olympic quarter-finalists. Accurate as of 23 December 2025.

Players	Matches	Results		Difference
Players	Matches	Won	Lost	Difference
(China) Chen Yufei	21	3	18	–15
(China) Han Yue	9	7	2	+5
(China) He Bingjiao	7	1	6	–5
(China) Li Xuerui	11	4	7	–3
(China) Lu Lan	2	1	1	0
(China) Wang Lin	2	1	1	0
(China) Wang Shixian	12	4	8	–4
(China) Wang Xin	3	0	3	–3
(China) Wang Yihan	13	1	12	–11
(China) Wang Zhiyi	11	6	5	+1
(China) Zhang Yiman	3	2	1	+1
(Chinese Taipei) Cheng Shao-chieh	5	4	1	+3
(Chinese Taipei) Tai Tzu-ying	36	16	20	–4
(Denmark) Tine Baun	5	3	2	+1
(Germany) Juliane Schenk	9	6	3	+3
(Hong Kong) Yip Pui Yin	16	13	3	+10

Players	Matches	Results		Difference
Players	Matches	Won	Lost	Difference
(Hong Kong) Zhou Mi	1	1	0	+1
(India) Saina Nehwal	20	8	12	–4
(India) P. V. Sindhu	13	9	4	+5
(Indonesia) Maria Kristin Yulianti	1	1	0	+1
(Indonesia) Lindaweni Fanetri	5	4	1	+3
(Indonesia) Gregoria Mariska Tunjung	14	11	3	+8
(Indonesia) Putri Kusuma Wardani	2	1	1	0
(Japan) Minatsu Mitani	9	7	2	+5
(Japan) Aya Ohori	8	4	4	0
(Japan) Nozomi Okuhara	20	8	12	–4
(Japan) Akane Yamaguchi	25	11	14	–3
(South Korea) An Se-young	13	1	12	–11
(South Korea) Bae Yeon-ju	7	4	3	+1
(South Korea) Sung Ji-hyun	23	13	10	+3
(Spain) Carolina Marín	13	7	6	+1
(Thailand) Porntip Buranaprasertsuk	2	2	0	+2

Olympic Games
Preceded by Nuttapong Ketin	Flagbearer for Thailand; Rio de Janeiro 2016	Succeeded by Naphaswan Yangpaiboon with Savate Sresthaporn
