= Adriyanti Firdasari =

Indonesian badminton player

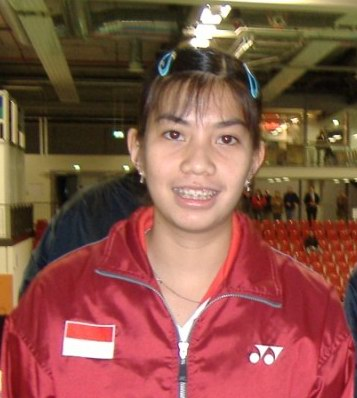

Personal information
- Born: 16 December 1986 (age 39) Jakarta, Indonesia
- Height: 1.70 m (5 ft 7 in)
- Weight: 58 kg (128 lb)

Sport
- Country: Indonesia
- Sport: Badminton
- Handedness: Right
- Retired: December 2015

Women's singles
- Highest ranking: 15 (19 November 2009)
- BWF profile
Medal record
Women's badminton
Representing Indonesia
Sudirman Cup
Silver medal – second place	2005 Beijing	Mixed team
Silver medal – second place	2007 Glasgow	Mixed team
Bronze medal – third place	2009 Guangzhou	Mixed team
Bronze medal – third place	2011 Qingdao	Mixed team
Uber Cup
Silver medal – second place	2008 Jakarta	Women's team
Bronze medal – third place	2010 Kuala Lumpur	Women's team
Asian Games
Bronze medal – third place	2010 Guangzhou	Women's team
SEA Games
Gold medal – first place	2005 Manila	Women's singles
Gold medal – first place	2007 Nakhon Ratchasima	Women's team
Silver medal – second place	2007 Nakhon Ratchasima	Women's singles
Silver medal – second place	2009 Vientiane	Women's team
Silver medal – second place	2011 Jakarta–Palembang	Women's singles
Silver medal – second place	2011 Jakarta–Palembang	Women's team
Bronze medal – third place	2005 Manila	Women's team
World Junior Championships
Bronze medal – third place	2002 Pretoria	Mixed team
Asian Junior Championships
Bronze medal – third place	2004 Hwacheon	Girls' team

Adrianti Firdasari (born 16 December 1986) is a retired Indonesian badminton player from Jaya Raya Jakarta club.

== Career ==
In 2005, Firdasari won the women's singles at the New Zealand Open. Firdasari played the 2007 BWF World Championships in women's singles, and was defeated in the second round by Xu Huaiwen of Germany, 21–17, 22–20. She played on Sudirman Cup for Indonesia, who finished second to China in 2005 and 2007. In the 2008 Singapore Super Series, she made a surprise by beating the 1st-seeded Pi Hongyan of France, 21–16, 20–22, 21–16 in the second round. She played in 2008 Denmark Super Series and she beat Wang Chen of Hongkong, 21–10 19–21 21–14, in the first round. In the next round, she lost to Tine Rasmussen of Denmark in straight sets. In 2009, she played in the Korea Super Series and went through the quarterfinal after beating Saina Nehwal of India in rubber set. During the 2011 SEA Games, she lost to Fu Mingtian of Singapore in the finals, 14–21, 21–12, 22–20. At the 2012 Summer Olympics she qualified from Group O, before losing to Wang Xin in the second round. Firdasari announced her retirement through her Instagram account in December 2015, and in 2016, she started a new career as a coach in Jaya Raya badminton club.

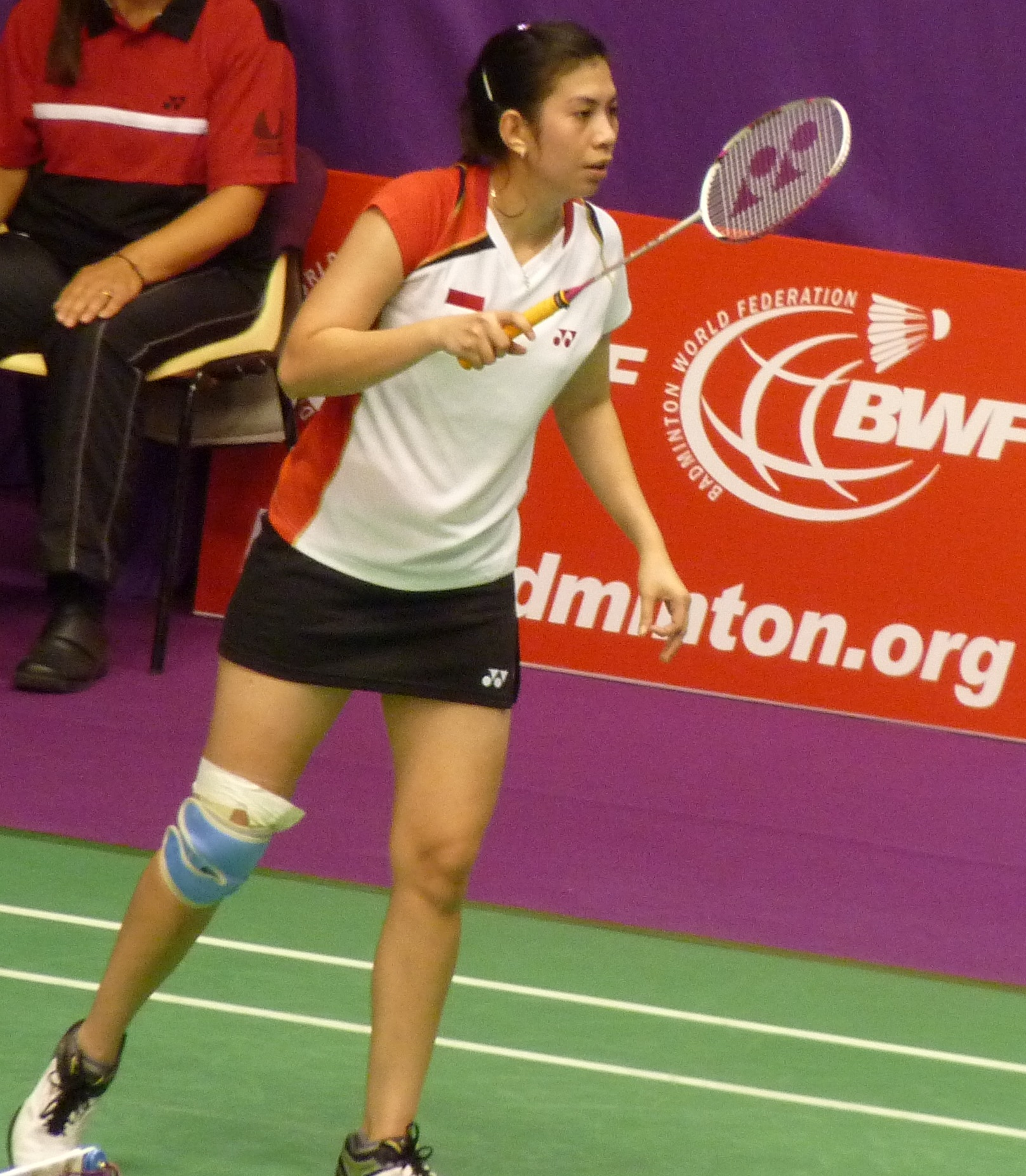
Adriyanti Firdasari

== Achievements ==
=== SEA Games ===
Women's singles
Year	Venue	Opponent	Score	Result	Ref.
2005	PhilSports Arena, Metro Manila, Philippines	(Malaysia) Wong Mew Choo	11–8, 11–7	Gold	
2007	Wongchawalitkul University, Nakhon Ratchasima, Thailand	(Indonesia) Maria Kristin Yulianti	16–21, 15–21	Silver	
2011	Istora Gelora Bung Karno, Jakarta, Indonesia	(Singapore) Fu Mingtian	21–14, 12–21, 20–22	Silver	

=== BWF Grand Prix (3 titles, 2 runners-up) ===
The BWF Grand Prix had two levels, the Grand Prix and Grand Prix Gold. It was a series of badminton tournaments sanctioned by the Badminton World Federation (BWF) and played between 2007 and 2017. The World Badminton Grand Prix has been sanctioned by the International Badminton Federation from 1983 to 2006.

Women's singles
Year	Tournament	Opponent	Score	Result	Ref.
2005	New Zealand Open	(Indonesia) Fransisca Ratnasari	11–8, 11–5	(gold) Winner	
2006	Dutch Open	(China) Li Wenyan	21–16, 21–19	(gold) Winner	
2010	Macau Open	(China) Li Xuerui	18–21, 15–21	(silver) Runner-up	
2014	Malaysia Grand Prix Gold	(China) Yao Xue	18–21, 8–21	(silver) Runner-up	
2014	Indonesian Masters	(Indonesia) Ruselli Hartawan	21–14, 21–14	(gold) Winner	

BWF Grand Prix Gold tournament
BWF Grand Prix tournament

=== IBF International (1 runner-up) ===
Women's singles
Year	Tournament	Opponent	Score	Result	Ref.
2004	Malaysia Satellite	(Indonesia) Maria Kristin Yulianti	11–8, 2–11, 8–11	(silver) Runner-up	

== Performance timeline ==
=== National team ===
- Junior level

Team event	2004
Asian Junior Championships	Bronze

Team Event	2002
World Junior Championships	Bronze

- Senior level

Team events	2005	2006	2007	2008	2009	2010	2011
SEA Games	Bronze	—N/a	Gold	—N/a	Silver	—N/a	Silver
Asian Games	—N/a	R	—N/a			Bronze	—N/a
Uber Cup	—N/a	A	—N/a	Silver	—N/a	Bronze	—N/a
Sudirman Cup	Silver	—N/a	Silver	—N/a	Bronze	—N/a	Bronze

=== Individual competitions ===
- Senior level

Event	2005	2007	2009	2011
SEA Games	Gold	Silver	QF	Silver

Event	2009	2010	2011	2013
World Championships	R2	R2	R1	R1

Event	2012
Olympic Games	R16

Tournament	BWF Grand Prix and Grand Prix Gold									Best
Tournament	2007	2008	2009	2010	2011	2012	2013	2014	2015	Best
Malaysia Masters	—N/a		A		R1	A		F	A	F (2014)
Indonesian Masters	—N/a			R2	R2	SF	R1	W	R1	W (2014)
