= 2007 BWF season =

2007 BWF Season
Details
- Duration: 16 January 2007 – 29 December 2007
- Tournaments: 96 * Level 1: 3 * Level 2: 12 * Level 3: 11 * Level 4: 60 * CC: 3 * Others: 7

Achievements (singles)

Awards
- Player of the year: (China) Lin Dan

The 2007 BWF Season was the overall badminton circuit organized by the Badminton World Federation (BWF) for the 2007 badminton season to publish and promote the sport. Besides the BWF World Championships, BWF promotes the sport of Badminton through an extensive worldwide program of events. These events have various purposes according to their level and territory in which they are held but those events owned by BWF seek to showcase the Sport via the widest possible quality television broadcast and build the fanbase of the Sport throughout the World.

The world badminton tournament structure has four levels: Level 1 (BWF Major Events: Thomas Cup, Uber Cup, Sudirman Cup, Suhadinata Cup, World Championships, Bimantara Cup, and World Senior Championships), Level 2 (BWF Superseries: Superseries and Superseries Masters Finals), Level 3 (BWF Grand Prix: Grand Prix and Grand Prix Gold), and Level 4 (BWF Continental Tournament: International Challenge, International Series, and Future Series). The Thomas Cup & Uber Cup, Sudirman Cup and Suhandinata Cup are Teams Events. The others – Superseries, Grand Prix Events, International Challenge, International Series, Future Series and Bimantara Cup are all individual tournaments. The higher the level of tournament, the larger the prize money and the more ranking points available.

The 2007 BWF Season calendar comprised the World Championships tournaments, the Sudirman Cup, the BWF Super Series, the Grand Prix (Grand Prix Gold and Grand Prix), the International Series (International Series and International Challenge), and Future Series.

== Schedule ==
This is the complete schedule of events on the 2007 calendar, with the Champions and Runners-up documented.

Key

World Championships
Super Series Finals
Super Series
Grand Prix Gold
Grand Prix
International Challenge
International Series
Future Series
Team events

=== January ===
Week of	Tournament	Champions	Runners-up
15 January	Malaysia Open (Draw): Host: Kuala Lumpur, Malaysia; Level: Superseries; Prize: $200,000; Format: 32MS/32WS/32MD/32WD/32XD	(Denmark) Peter Gade	(China) Bao Chunlai
15 January	Malaysia Open (Draw): Host: Kuala Lumpur, Malaysia; Level: Superseries; Prize: $200,000; Format: 32MS/32WS/32MD/32WD/32XD	Score: 21–15, 17–21, 21–14	
15 January	Malaysia Open (Draw): Host: Kuala Lumpur, Malaysia; Level: Superseries; Prize: $200,000; Format: 32MS/32WS/32MD/32WD/32XD	(China) Zhu Lin	(Malaysia) Wong Mew Choo
15 January	Malaysia Open (Draw): Host: Kuala Lumpur, Malaysia; Level: Superseries; Prize: $200,000; Format: 32MS/32WS/32MD/32WD/32XD	Score: 21–15, 21–12	
15 January	Malaysia Open (Draw): Host: Kuala Lumpur, Malaysia; Level: Superseries; Prize: $200,000; Format: 32MS/32WS/32MD/32WD/32XD	(Malaysia) Koo Kien Keat (Malaysia) Tan Boon Heong	(United States) Tony Gunawan (Indonesia) Candra Wijaya
15 January	Malaysia Open (Draw): Host: Kuala Lumpur, Malaysia; Level: Superseries; Prize: $200,000; Format: 32MS/32WS/32MD/32WD/32XD	Score: 21–15, 21–18	
15 January	Malaysia Open (Draw): Host: Kuala Lumpur, Malaysia; Level: Superseries; Prize: $200,000; Format: 32MS/32WS/32MD/32WD/32XD	(China) Gao Ling (China) Huang Sui	(Indonesia) Greysia Polii (Indonesia) Vita Marissa
15 January	Malaysia Open (Draw): Host: Kuala Lumpur, Malaysia; Level: Superseries; Prize: $200,000; Format: 32MS/32WS/32MD/32WD/32XD	Score: 19–21, 21–12, 21–11	
15 January	Malaysia Open (Draw): Host: Kuala Lumpur, Malaysia; Level: Superseries; Prize: $200,000; Format: 32MS/32WS/32MD/32WD/32XD	(China) Zheng Bo (China) Gao Ling	(England) Nathan Robertson (England) Gail Emms
15 January	Malaysia Open (Draw): Host: Kuala Lumpur, Malaysia; Level: Superseries; Prize: $200,000; Format: 32MS/32WS/32MD/32WD/32XD	Score: 21–12, 14–21, 21–15	
22 January	Korea Open (Draw): Host: Seoul, South Korea; Level: Superseries; Prize: $300,000; Format: 32MS/32WS/32MD/32WD/32XD	(China) Lin Dan	(China) Chen Jin
22 January	Korea Open (Draw): Host: Seoul, South Korea; Level: Superseries; Prize: $300,000; Format: 32MS/32WS/32MD/32WD/32XD	Score: 21–14, 21–19	
22 January	Korea Open (Draw): Host: Seoul, South Korea; Level: Superseries; Prize: $300,000; Format: 32MS/32WS/32MD/32WD/32XD	(China) Xie Xingfang	(China) Zhu Lin
22 January	Korea Open (Draw): Host: Seoul, South Korea; Level: Superseries; Prize: $300,000; Format: 32MS/32WS/32MD/32WD/32XD	Score: 21–14, 21–7	
22 January	Korea Open (Draw): Host: Seoul, South Korea; Level: Superseries; Prize: $300,000; Format: 32MS/32WS/32MD/32WD/32XD	(South Korea) Jung Jae-sung (South Korea) Lee Yong-dae	(South Korea) Lee Jae-jin (South Korea) Hwang Ji-man
22 January	Korea Open (Draw): Host: Seoul, South Korea; Level: Superseries; Prize: $300,000; Format: 32MS/32WS/32MD/32WD/32XD	Score: 21–16, 21–15	
22 January	Korea Open (Draw): Host: Seoul, South Korea; Level: Superseries; Prize: $300,000; Format: 32MS/32WS/32MD/32WD/32XD	(China) Gao Ling (China) Huang Sui	(China) Yang Wei (China) Zhang Jiewen
22 January	Korea Open (Draw): Host: Seoul, South Korea; Level: Superseries; Prize: $300,000; Format: 32MS/32WS/32MD/32WD/32XD	Score: 12–21, 21–14, 21–16	
22 January	Korea Open (Draw): Host: Seoul, South Korea; Level: Superseries; Prize: $300,000; Format: 32MS/32WS/32MD/32WD/32XD	(China) Zheng Bo (China) Gao Ling	(Denmark) Thomas Laybourn (Denmark) Kamilla Rytter Juhl
22 January	Korea Open (Draw): Host: Seoul, South Korea; Level: Superseries; Prize: $300,000; Format: 32MS/32WS/32MD/32WD/32XD	Score: 22–20, 21–19	
22 January	Swedish International (Draw): Host: Täby, Stockholm, Sweden; Level: International Series; Prize: €5,000; Format: 32MS/32WS/32MD/32WD/32XD	(Japan) Kenichi Tago	(Denmark) Jens Kristian Leth
22 January	Swedish International (Draw): Host: Täby, Stockholm, Sweden; Level: International Series; Prize: €5,000; Format: 32MS/32WS/32MD/32WD/32XD	Score: 21–15, 21–15	
22 January	Swedish International (Draw): Host: Täby, Stockholm, Sweden; Level: International Series; Prize: €5,000; Format: 32MS/32WS/32MD/32WD/32XD	(China) Li Wenyan	(Estonia) Kati Tolmoff
22 January	Swedish International (Draw): Host: Täby, Stockholm, Sweden; Level: International Series; Prize: €5,000; Format: 32MS/32WS/32MD/32WD/32XD	Score: 21–11, 21–6	
22 January	Swedish International (Draw): Host: Täby, Stockholm, Sweden; Level: International Series; Prize: €5,000; Format: 32MS/32WS/32MD/32WD/32XD	(Indonesia) Imam Sodikin (Sweden) Imanuel Hirschfeld	(Denmark) Rasmus Bonde (Denmark) Kasper Henriksen
22 January	Swedish International (Draw): Host: Täby, Stockholm, Sweden; Level: International Series; Prize: €5,000; Format: 32MS/32WS/32MD/32WD/32XD	Score: 21–14, 21–10	
22 January	Swedish International (Draw): Host: Täby, Stockholm, Sweden; Level: International Series; Prize: €5,000; Format: 32MS/32WS/32MD/32WD/32XD	(China) Guo Xin (China) Cai Jiani	(Denmark) Mie Schjött-Kristensen (Denmark) Christinna Pedersen
22 January	Swedish International (Draw): Host: Täby, Stockholm, Sweden; Level: International Series; Prize: €5,000; Format: 32MS/32WS/32MD/32WD/32XD	Score: 21–13, 21–14	
22 January	Swedish International (Draw): Host: Täby, Stockholm, Sweden; Level: International Series; Prize: €5,000; Format: 32MS/32WS/32MD/32WD/32XD	(Denmark) Rasmus Bonde (Denmark) Christinna Pedersen	(Denmark) Jacob Chemnitz (Denmark) Julie Houmann
22 January	Swedish International (Draw): Host: Täby, Stockholm, Sweden; Level: International Series; Prize: €5,000; Format: 32MS/32WS/32MD/32WD/32XD	Score: 21–12, 21–8	

=== February ===
Week of	Tournament	Champions	Runners-up
1 February	Iran Fajr International: Host: Isfahan, Iran; Level: Future Series; Format: 64MS/64WS/32MD/16WD	(France) Nabil Lasmari	(Sri Lanka) Niluka Karunaratne
1 February	Iran Fajr International: Host: Isfahan, Iran; Level: Future Series; Format: 64MS/64WS/32MD/16WD	Score: 9–21, 21–9, 21–19	
1 February	Iran Fajr International: Host: Isfahan, Iran; Level: Future Series; Format: 64MS/64WS/32MD/16WD	(Portugal) Ana Moura	(Sri Lanka) Renu Chandrika Hettiarachchige
1 February	Iran Fajr International: Host: Isfahan, Iran; Level: Future Series; Format: 64MS/64WS/32MD/16WD	Score: 21–16, 15–21, 21–18	
1 February	Iran Fajr International: Host: Isfahan, Iran; Level: Future Series; Format: 64MS/64WS/32MD/16WD	(Iran) Ali Shahhosseini (Iran) Nikzad Shiri	(Iran) Mohammad Reza Kheradmandi (Iran) Shahram Karami
1 February	Iran Fajr International: Host: Isfahan, Iran; Level: Future Series; Format: 64MS/64WS/32MD/16WD	Score: 21–19, 21–17	
1 February	Iran Fajr International: Host: Isfahan, Iran; Level: Future Series; Format: 64MS/64WS/32MD/16WD	(Iran) Negin Amiripour (Iran) Sahar Zamanian	(Sri Lanka) Renu Chandrika Hettiarachchige (Sri Lanka) Thilini Jayasinghe
1 February	Iran Fajr International: Host: Isfahan, Iran; Level: Future Series; Format: 64MS/64WS/32MD/16WD	Score: 22–20, 13–21, 21–12	
19 February	Bahrain Satellite: Host: Manama, Bahrain; Level: International Series; Prize: $5,000; Format: 64MS/32WS/32MD/16WD/16XD	(Japan) Sho Sasaki	(Spain) Pablo Abián
19 February	Bahrain Satellite: Host: Manama, Bahrain; Level: International Series; Prize: $5,000; Format: 64MS/32WS/32MD/16WD/16XD	Score: 21–10, 21–11	
19 February	Bahrain Satellite: Host: Manama, Bahrain; Level: International Series; Prize: $5,000; Format: 64MS/32WS/32MD/16WD/16XD	(Italy) Agnese Allegrini	(India) Trupti Murgunde
19 February	Bahrain Satellite: Host: Manama, Bahrain; Level: International Series; Prize: $5,000; Format: 64MS/32WS/32MD/16WD/16XD	Score: 21–11, 21–18	
19 February	Bahrain Satellite: Host: Manama, Bahrain; Level: International Series; Prize: $5,000; Format: 64MS/32WS/32MD/16WD/16XD	(Germany) Jochen Cassel (Germany) Thomas Tesche	(Malaysia) Goh Yin Jing (Malaysia) Azrihanif Azahar
19 February	Bahrain Satellite: Host: Manama, Bahrain; Level: International Series; Prize: $5,000; Format: 64MS/32WS/32MD/16WD/16XD	Score: 21–15, 21–18	
19 February	Bahrain Satellite: Host: Manama, Bahrain; Level: International Series; Prize: $5,000; Format: 64MS/32WS/32MD/16WD/16XD	(Indonesia) Shendy Puspa Irawati (Indonesia) Meiliana Jauhari	(Malaysia) Wong Wai See (Malaysia) Chor Hooi Yee
19 February	Bahrain Satellite: Host: Manama, Bahrain; Level: International Series; Prize: $5,000; Format: 64MS/32WS/32MD/16WD/16XD	Score: 21–13, 21–14	
19 February	Bahrain Satellite: Host: Manama, Bahrain; Level: International Series; Prize: $5,000; Format: 64MS/32WS/32MD/16WD/16XD	(Indonesia) David Pohan (Indonesia) Meiliana Jauhari	(Portugal) Alexandre Paixão (Portugal) Filipa Lamy
19 February	Bahrain Satellite: Host: Manama, Bahrain; Level: International Series; Prize: $5,000; Format: 64MS/32WS/32MD/16WD/16XD	Score: 19-21, 21–14, 21–14	
19 February	Austrian International: Host: Vienna, Austria; Level: International Series; Prize: €2,500; Format: 32MS/32WS/32MD/32WD/32XD	(China) Lu Yi	(China) Qiu Yanbo
19 February	Austrian International: Host: Vienna, Austria; Level: International Series; Prize: €2,500; Format: 32MS/32WS/32MD/32WD/32XD	Score: 16–21, 21–15, 21–18	
19 February	Austrian International: Host: Vienna, Austria; Level: International Series; Prize: €2,500; Format: 32MS/32WS/32MD/32WD/32XD	(China) Zhu Jingjing	(Japan) Yoshimi Hataya
19 February	Austrian International: Host: Vienna, Austria; Level: International Series; Prize: €2,500; Format: 32MS/32WS/32MD/32WD/32XD	Score: 21–7, 21–14	
19 February	Austrian International: Host: Vienna, Austria; Level: International Series; Prize: €2,500; Format: 32MS/32WS/32MD/32WD/32XD	(China) Guo Zhendong (China) He Hanbin	(Russia) Vitalij Durkin (Russia) Aleksandr Nikolaenko
19 February	Austrian International: Host: Vienna, Austria; Level: International Series; Prize: €2,500; Format: 32MS/32WS/32MD/32WD/32XD	Score: 21–15, 19–21, 21–17	
19 February	Austrian International: Host: Vienna, Austria; Level: International Series; Prize: €2,500; Format: 32MS/32WS/32MD/32WD/32XD	(China) Cheng Shu (China) Zhao Yunlei	(China) Pan Pan (China) Tian Qing
19 February	Austrian International: Host: Vienna, Austria; Level: International Series; Prize: €2,500; Format: 32MS/32WS/32MD/32WD/32XD	Score: 21–18, 21–13	
19 February	Austrian International: Host: Vienna, Austria; Level: International Series; Prize: €2,500; Format: 32MS/32WS/32MD/32WD/32XD	(Russia) Vitalij Durkin (Russia) Valeria Sorokina	(Russia) Aleksandr Nikolaenko (Russia) Nina Vislova
19 February	Austrian International: Host: Vienna, Austria; Level: International Series; Prize: €2,500; Format: 32MS/32WS/32MD/32WD/32XD	Score: 21–14, 22–20	
26 February	German Open (Draw): Host: Mülheim an der Ruhr, Germany; Level: Grand Prix; Prize: $80,000; Format: 64MS/32WS/32MD/32WD/32XD	(China) Lin Dan	(China) Chen Yu
26 February	German Open (Draw): Host: Mülheim an der Ruhr, Germany; Level: Grand Prix; Prize: $80,000; Format: 64MS/32WS/32MD/32WD/32XD	Score: Walkover	
26 February	German Open (Draw): Host: Mülheim an der Ruhr, Germany; Level: Grand Prix; Prize: $80,000; Format: 64MS/32WS/32MD/32WD/32XD	(China) Xie Xingfang	(Germany) Xu Huaiwen
26 February	German Open (Draw): Host: Mülheim an der Ruhr, Germany; Level: Grand Prix; Prize: $80,000; Format: 64MS/32WS/32MD/32WD/32XD	Score: 19–21, 21–12, 21–19	
26 February	German Open (Draw): Host: Mülheim an der Ruhr, Germany; Level: Grand Prix; Prize: $80,000; Format: 64MS/32WS/32MD/32WD/32XD	(South Korea) Lee Jae-jin (South Korea) Hwang Ji-man	(South Korea) Jung Jae-sung (South Korea) Lee Yong-dae
26 February	German Open (Draw): Host: Mülheim an der Ruhr, Germany; Level: Grand Prix; Prize: $80,000; Format: 64MS/32WS/32MD/32WD/32XD	Score: 21–18, 22–20	
26 February	German Open (Draw): Host: Mülheim an der Ruhr, Germany; Level: Grand Prix; Prize: $80,000; Format: 64MS/32WS/32MD/32WD/32XD	(China) Yang Wei (China) Zhang Jiewen	(China) Du Jing (China) Yu Yang
26 February	German Open (Draw): Host: Mülheim an der Ruhr, Germany; Level: Grand Prix; Prize: $80,000; Format: 64MS/32WS/32MD/32WD/32XD	Score: 21–8, 21–7	
26 February	German Open (Draw): Host: Mülheim an der Ruhr, Germany; Level: Grand Prix; Prize: $80,000; Format: 64MS/32WS/32MD/32WD/32XD	(China) Zheng Bo (China) Gao Ling	(China) Xu Chen (China) Zhao Tingting
26 February	German Open (Draw): Host: Mülheim an der Ruhr, Germany; Level: Grand Prix; Prize: $80,000; Format: 64MS/32WS/32MD/32WD/32XD	Score: 21–11, 21–10	

=== March ===
Week of	Tournament	Champions	Runners-up
1 March	Croatian International: Host: Zagreb, Croatia; Level: International Series; Prize: €2,500; Format: 32MS/32WS/32MD/32WD/32XD	(England) Carl Baxter	(Republic of Ireland) Scott Evans
1 March	Croatian International: Host: Zagreb, Croatia; Level: International Series; Prize: €2,500; Format: 32MS/32WS/32MD/32WD/32XD	Score: 21–13, 21–14	
1 March	Croatian International: Host: Zagreb, Croatia; Level: International Series; Prize: €2,500; Format: 32MS/32WS/32MD/32WD/32XD	(China) Guo Xin	(England) Elizabeth Cann
1 March	Croatian International: Host: Zagreb, Croatia; Level: International Series; Prize: €2,500; Format: 32MS/32WS/32MD/32WD/32XD	Score: 21–11, 21–7	
1 March	Croatian International: Host: Zagreb, Croatia; Level: International Series; Prize: €2,500; Format: 32MS/32WS/32MD/32WD/32XD	(Belgium) Wouter Claes (Belgium) Frédéric Mawet	(Germany) Jochen Cassel (Germany) Thomas Tesche
1 March	Croatian International: Host: Zagreb, Croatia; Level: International Series; Prize: €2,500; Format: 32MS/32WS/32MD/32WD/32XD	Score: 11–21, 22–20, 21–19	
1 March	Croatian International: Host: Zagreb, Croatia; Level: International Series; Prize: €2,500; Format: 32MS/32WS/32MD/32WD/32XD	(China) Cai Jiani (China) Guo Xin	(Singapore) Gu Juan (Singapore) Zhang Beiwen
1 March	Croatian International: Host: Zagreb, Croatia; Level: International Series; Prize: €2,500; Format: 32MS/32WS/32MD/32WD/32XD	Score: 15–21, 21–6, 21–10	
1 March	Croatian International: Host: Zagreb, Croatia; Level: International Series; Prize: €2,500; Format: 32MS/32WS/32MD/32WD/32XD	(Belgium) Wouter Claes (Belgium) Nathalie Descamps	(Poland) Adam Cwalina (Poland) Małgorzata Kurdelska
1 March	Croatian International: Host: Zagreb, Croatia; Level: International Series; Prize: €2,500; Format: 32MS/32WS/32MD/32WD/32XD	Score: 21–13, 16–21, 21–13	
5 March	All England Open (Draw): Host: Birmingham, England; Level: Superseries; Prize: $200,000; Format: 32MS/32WS/32MD/32WD/32XD	(China) Lin Dan	(China) Chen Yu
5 March	All England Open (Draw): Host: Birmingham, England; Level: Superseries; Prize: $200,000; Format: 32MS/32WS/32MD/32WD/32XD	Score: 21–13, 21–12	
5 March	All England Open (Draw): Host: Birmingham, England; Level: Superseries; Prize: $200,000; Format: 32MS/32WS/32MD/32WD/32XD	(China) Xie Xingfang	(France) Pi Hongyan
5 March	All England Open (Draw): Host: Birmingham, England; Level: Superseries; Prize: $200,000; Format: 32MS/32WS/32MD/32WD/32XD	Score: 21–6, 21–13	
5 March	All England Open (Draw): Host: Birmingham, England; Level: Superseries; Prize: $200,000; Format: 32MS/32WS/32MD/32WD/32XD	(Malaysia) Koo Kien Keat (Malaysia) Tan Boon Heong	(China) Cai Yun (China) Fu Haifeng
5 March	All England Open (Draw): Host: Birmingham, England; Level: Superseries; Prize: $200,000; Format: 32MS/32WS/32MD/32WD/32XD	Score: 21–15, 21–18	
5 March	All England Open (Draw): Host: Birmingham, England; Level: Superseries; Prize: $200,000; Format: 32MS/32WS/32MD/32WD/32XD	(China) Wei Yili (China) Zhang Yawen	(China) Yang Wei (China) Zhang Jiewen
5 March	All England Open (Draw): Host: Birmingham, England; Level: Superseries; Prize: $200,000; Format: 32MS/32WS/32MD/32WD/32XD	Score: 21–16, 8–21, 24–22	
5 March	All England Open (Draw): Host: Birmingham, England; Level: Superseries; Prize: $200,000; Format: 32MS/32WS/32MD/32WD/32XD	(China) Zheng Bo (China) Gao Ling	(England) Anthony Clark (England) Donna Kellogg
5 March	All England Open (Draw): Host: Birmingham, England; Level: Superseries; Prize: $200,000; Format: 32MS/32WS/32MD/32WD/32XD	Score: 16–21, 21–18, 21–14	
12 March	Swiss Open (Draw): Host: Basel, Switzerland; Level: Superseries; Prize: $200,000; Format: 32MS/32WS/32MD/32WD/32XD	(China) Chen Jin	(Indonesia) Simon Santoso
12 March	Swiss Open (Draw): Host: Basel, Switzerland; Level: Superseries; Prize: $200,000; Format: 32MS/32WS/32MD/32WD/32XD	Score: 21–16, 21–10	
12 March	Swiss Open (Draw): Host: Basel, Switzerland; Level: Superseries; Prize: $200,000; Format: 32MS/32WS/32MD/32WD/32XD	(China) Zhang Ning	(China) Lu Lan
12 March	Swiss Open (Draw): Host: Basel, Switzerland; Level: Superseries; Prize: $200,000; Format: 32MS/32WS/32MD/32WD/32XD	Score: 21–16, 21–18	
12 March	Swiss Open (Draw): Host: Basel, Switzerland; Level: Superseries; Prize: $200,000; Format: 32MS/32WS/32MD/32WD/32XD	(Malaysia) Koo Kien Keat (Malaysia) Tan Boon Heong	(Denmark) Jens Eriksen (Denmark) Martin Lundgaard Hansen
12 March	Swiss Open (Draw): Host: Basel, Switzerland; Level: Superseries; Prize: $200,000; Format: 32MS/32WS/32MD/32WD/32XD	Score: 17–21, 21–16, 21–12	
12 March	Swiss Open (Draw): Host: Basel, Switzerland; Level: Superseries; Prize: $200,000; Format: 32MS/32WS/32MD/32WD/32XD	(China) Zhao Tingting (China) Yang Wei	(South Korea) Lee Kyung-won (South Korea) Lee Hyo-jung
12 March	Swiss Open (Draw): Host: Basel, Switzerland; Level: Superseries; Prize: $200,000; Format: 32MS/32WS/32MD/32WD/32XD	Score: 21–15, 21–10	
12 March	Swiss Open (Draw): Host: Basel, Switzerland; Level: Superseries; Prize: $200,000; Format: 32MS/32WS/32MD/32WD/32XD	(South Korea) Lee Yong-dae (South Korea) Lee Hyo-jung	(Indonesia) Muhammad Rijal (Indonesia) Greysia Polii
12 March	Swiss Open (Draw): Host: Basel, Switzerland; Level: Superseries; Prize: $200,000; Format: 32MS/32WS/32MD/32WD/32XD	Score: 14–21, 21–16, 21–18	
12 March	Ecuador International: Host: Cuenca, Ecuador; Level: Future Series; Format: 32MS/32WS/8MD/8WD/16XD	(France) Brice Leverdez	(Portugal) Ricardo Fernandes
12 March	Ecuador International: Host: Cuenca, Ecuador; Level: Future Series; Format: 32MS/32WS/8MD/8WD/16XD	Score: 21–17, 21–16	
12 March	Ecuador International: Host: Cuenca, Ecuador; Level: Future Series; Format: 32MS/32WS/8MD/8WD/16XD	(Spain) Yoana Martinez	(Portugal) Filipa Lamy
12 March	Ecuador International: Host: Cuenca, Ecuador; Level: Future Series; Format: 32MS/32WS/8MD/8WD/16XD	Score: 21–16, 21–11	
12 March	Ecuador International: Host: Cuenca, Ecuador; Level: Future Series; Format: 32MS/32WS/8MD/8WD/16XD	(Peru) Francisco Ugaz (Peru) Juan Jose Espinosa	(Peru) Antonio de Vinatea (Peru) Martin del Valle
12 March	Ecuador International: Host: Cuenca, Ecuador; Level: Future Series; Format: 32MS/32WS/8MD/8WD/16XD	Score: 21–18, 21–17	
12 March	Ecuador International: Host: Cuenca, Ecuador; Level: Future Series; Format: 32MS/32WS/8MD/8WD/16XD	(Portugal) Ana Moura (Portugal) Filipa Lamy	(Peru) Jie Meng (Peru) Valeria Rivero
12 March	Ecuador International: Host: Cuenca, Ecuador; Level: Future Series; Format: 32MS/32WS/8MD/8WD/16XD	Score: 21–16, 21–11	
12 March	Ecuador International: Host: Cuenca, Ecuador; Level: Future Series; Format: 32MS/32WS/8MD/8WD/16XD	(Peru) Javier Jimeno (Peru) Valeria Rivero	(Peru) Francisco Ugaz (Peru) Jie Meng
12 March	Ecuador International: Host: Cuenca, Ecuador; Level: Future Series; Format: 32MS/32WS/8MD/8WD/16XD	Score: 21–19, 21–19	
19 March	Giraldilla International: Host: Havana, Cuba; Level: Future Series; Format: 32MS/32WS/16MD/16WD/32XD	(Spain) Pablo Abián	(Spain) Ernesto Velázquez
19 March	Giraldilla International: Host: Havana, Cuba; Level: Future Series; Format: 32MS/32WS/16MD/16WD/32XD	Score: 20–22, 21–15, 21–9	
19 March	Giraldilla International: Host: Havana, Cuba; Level: Future Series; Format: 32MS/32WS/16MD/16WD/32XD	(Italy) Agnese Allegrini	(Cuba) Solángel Guzmán
19 March	Giraldilla International: Host: Havana, Cuba; Level: Future Series; Format: 32MS/32WS/16MD/16WD/32XD	Score: 21–11, 21–13	
19 March	Giraldilla International: Host: Havana, Cuba; Level: Future Series; Format: 32MS/32WS/16MD/16WD/32XD	(France) Luong Lenaic (Algeria) Nabil Lasmari	(Cuba) Alexander Hernandez (Cuba) Osleni Guerrero
19 March	Giraldilla International: Host: Havana, Cuba; Level: Future Series; Format: 32MS/32WS/16MD/16WD/32XD	Score: 21–18, 21–17	
19 March	Giraldilla International: Host: Havana, Cuba; Level: Future Series; Format: 32MS/32WS/16MD/16WD/32XD	(Cuba) Leydi Edith Mora (Cuba) Solángel Guzmán	(Peru) Jie Meng (Peru) Valeria Rivero
19 March	Giraldilla International: Host: Havana, Cuba; Level: Future Series; Format: 32MS/32WS/16MD/16WD/32XD	Score: 21–15, 16–21, 21–12	
19 March	Giraldilla International: Host: Havana, Cuba; Level: Future Series; Format: 32MS/32WS/16MD/16WD/32XD	(Italy) Klaus Raffeiner (Italy) Agnese Allegrini	(Peru) Francisco Ugaz (Peru) Jie Meng
19 March	Giraldilla International: Host: Havana, Cuba; Level: Future Series; Format: 32MS/32WS/16MD/16WD/32XD	Score: 21–11, 21–17	
19 March	Banuinvest International: Host: Timișoara, Romania; Level: International Series; Prize: $5,000; Format: 32MS/32WS/32MD/16WD/32XD	(Japan) Sho Sasaki	(Indonesia) Andre Kurniawan Tedjono
19 March	Banuinvest International: Host: Timișoara, Romania; Level: International Series; Prize: $5,000; Format: 32MS/32WS/32MD/16WD/32XD	Score: 21–8, 21–12	
19 March	Banuinvest International: Host: Timișoara, Romania; Level: International Series; Prize: $5,000; Format: 32MS/32WS/32MD/16WD/32XD	(England) Tracey Hallam	(Indonesia) Rosaria Yusfin Pungkasari
19 March	Banuinvest International: Host: Timișoara, Romania; Level: International Series; Prize: $5,000; Format: 32MS/32WS/32MD/16WD/32XD	Score: 21–14, 21–14	
19 March	Banuinvest International: Host: Timișoara, Romania; Level: International Series; Prize: $5,000; Format: 32MS/32WS/32MD/16WD/32XD	(Japan) Kenichi Hayakawa (Japan) Kenta Kazuno	(Bulgaria) Julian Hristov (Bulgaria) Konstantin Dobrev
19 March	Banuinvest International: Host: Timișoara, Romania; Level: International Series; Prize: $5,000; Format: 32MS/32WS/32MD/16WD/32XD	Score: 21–10, 21–13	
19 March	Banuinvest International: Host: Timișoara, Romania; Level: International Series; Prize: $5,000; Format: 32MS/32WS/32MD/16WD/32XD	(Canada) Fiona McKee (Canada) Charmaine Reid	(Romania) Alexandra Milon (Romania) Florentina Petre
19 March	Banuinvest International: Host: Timișoara, Romania; Level: International Series; Prize: $5,000; Format: 32MS/32WS/32MD/16WD/32XD	Score: 10–21, 22–20, 21–19	
19 March	Banuinvest International: Host: Timișoara, Romania; Level: International Series; Prize: $5,000; Format: 32MS/32WS/32MD/16WD/32XD	(Ukraine) Valeriy Atrashchenkov (Ukraine) Elena Prus	(Czech Republic) Pavel Florián (Czech Republic) Martina Benešová
19 March	Banuinvest International: Host: Timișoara, Romania; Level: International Series; Prize: $5,000; Format: 32MS/32WS/32MD/16WD/32XD	Score: 21–16, 21–12	
26 March	Finnish International: Host: Helsinki, Finland; Level: International Series; Prize: €2,500; Format: 32MS/32WS/32MD/16WD/32XD	(Denmark) Joachim Persson	(Ukraine) Vladislav Druzchenko
26 March	Finnish International: Host: Helsinki, Finland; Level: International Series; Prize: €2,500; Format: 32MS/32WS/32MD/16WD/32XD	Score: 21–14, 21–18	
26 March	Finnish International: Host: Helsinki, Finland; Level: International Series; Prize: €2,500; Format: 32MS/32WS/32MD/16WD/32XD	(China) Li Wenyan	(Germany) Juliane Schenk
26 March	Finnish International: Host: Helsinki, Finland; Level: International Series; Prize: €2,500; Format: 32MS/32WS/32MD/16WD/32XD	Score: 19–21, 21–14, 21–17	
26 March	Finnish International: Host: Helsinki, Finland; Level: International Series; Prize: €2,500; Format: 32MS/32WS/32MD/16WD/32XD	(Belgium) Wouter Claes (Belgium) Frédéric Mawet	(Germany) Johannes Schöttler (Germany) Tim Dettmann
26 March	Finnish International: Host: Helsinki, Finland; Level: International Series; Prize: €2,500; Format: 32MS/32WS/32MD/16WD/32XD	Score: 21–16, 21–16	
26 March	Finnish International: Host: Helsinki, Finland; Level: International Series; Prize: €2,500; Format: 32MS/32WS/32MD/16WD/32XD	(Denmark) Mie Schjøtt-Kristensen (Denmark) Christinna Pedersen	(Netherlands) Rachel van Cutsen (Netherlands) Paulien van Dooremalen
26 March	Finnish International: Host: Helsinki, Finland; Level: International Series; Prize: €2,500; Format: 32MS/32WS/32MD/16WD/32XD	Score: 19–21, 21–10, 21–11	
26 March	Finnish International: Host: Helsinki, Finland; Level: International Series; Prize: €2,500; Format: 32MS/32WS/32MD/16WD/32XD	(Germany) Tim Dettmann (Germany) Annekatrin Lillie	(Denmark) Rasmus Andersen (Russia) Anastasia Russkikh
26 March	Finnish International: Host: Helsinki, Finland; Level: International Series; Prize: €2,500; Format: 32MS/32WS/32MD/16WD/32XD	Score: 16-21, 25–23, 21–17	

=== April ===
Week of	Tournament	Champions	Runners-up
2 April	Osaka International: Host: Osaka, Japan; Level: International Challenge; Prize: $15,000; Format: 32MS/32WS/32MD/32WD/32XD	(Japan) Sho Sasaki	(Japan) Shoji Sato
2 April	Osaka International: Host: Osaka, Japan; Level: International Challenge; Prize: $15,000; Format: 32MS/32WS/32MD/32WD/32XD	Score: 19–21, 21–14, 21–19	
2 April	Osaka International: Host: Osaka, Japan; Level: International Challenge; Prize: $15,000; Format: 32MS/32WS/32MD/32WD/32XD	(Japan) Eriko Hirose	(Japan) Kanako Yonekura
2 April	Osaka International: Host: Osaka, Japan; Level: International Challenge; Prize: $15,000; Format: 32MS/32WS/32MD/32WD/32XD	Score: 21–14, 21–11	
2 April	Osaka International: Host: Osaka, Japan; Level: International Challenge; Prize: $15,000; Format: 32MS/32WS/32MD/32WD/32XD	(South Korea) Han Sang-hoon (South Korea) Cho Gun-woo	(Japan) Shuichi Sakamoto (Japan) Shintaro Ikeda
2 April	Osaka International: Host: Osaka, Japan; Level: International Challenge; Prize: $15,000; Format: 32MS/32WS/32MD/32WD/32XD	Score: 21–18, 16–21, 21–11	
2 April	Osaka International: Host: Osaka, Japan; Level: International Challenge; Prize: $15,000; Format: 32MS/32WS/32MD/32WD/32XD	(Japan) Aki Akao (Japan) Tomomi Matsuda	(Japan) Kumiko Ogura (Japan) Reiko Shiota
2 April	Osaka International: Host: Osaka, Japan; Level: International Challenge; Prize: $15,000; Format: 32MS/32WS/32MD/32WD/32XD	Score: 12–21, 23–21, 21–14	
2 April	Osaka International: Host: Osaka, Japan; Level: International Challenge; Prize: $15,000; Format: 32MS/32WS/32MD/32WD/32XD	(Japan) Keita Masuda (Japan) Miyuki Maeda	(South Korea) Cho Gun-woo (South Korea) Hong Soo-jung
2 April	Osaka International: Host: Osaka, Japan; Level: International Challenge; Prize: $15,000; Format: 32MS/32WS/32MD/32WD/32XD	Score: 21–10, 21–9	
9 April	Badminton Asia Championships (Draw): Host: Johor Bahru, Malaysia; Level: Continental Championships; Prize: $125,000; Format: 64MS/32WS/32MD/32WD/32XD	(Indonesia) Taufik Hidayat	(China) Chen Hong
9 April	Badminton Asia Championships (Draw): Host: Johor Bahru, Malaysia; Level: Continental Championships; Prize: $125,000; Format: 64MS/32WS/32MD/32WD/32XD	Score: 21–18, 21–19	
9 April	Badminton Asia Championships (Draw): Host: Johor Bahru, Malaysia; Level: Continental Championships; Prize: $125,000; Format: 64MS/32WS/32MD/32WD/32XD	(China) Jiang Yanjiao	(China) Lu Lan
9 April	Badminton Asia Championships (Draw): Host: Johor Bahru, Malaysia; Level: Continental Championships; Prize: $125,000; Format: 64MS/32WS/32MD/32WD/32XD	Score: 25–23, 23–21	
9 April	Badminton Asia Championships (Draw): Host: Johor Bahru, Malaysia; Level: Continental Championships; Prize: $125,000; Format: 64MS/32WS/32MD/32WD/32XD	(Malaysia) Choong Tan Fook (Malaysia) Lee Wan Wah	(Malaysia) Koo Kien Keat (Malaysia) Tan Boon Heong
9 April	Badminton Asia Championships (Draw): Host: Johor Bahru, Malaysia; Level: Continental Championships; Prize: $125,000; Format: 64MS/32WS/32MD/32WD/32XD	Score: 21–14, 11–21, 21–12	
9 April	Badminton Asia Championships (Draw): Host: Johor Bahru, Malaysia; Level: Continental Championships; Prize: $125,000; Format: 64MS/32WS/32MD/32WD/32XD	(China) Yang Wei (China) Zhao Tingting	(China) Cheng Shu (China) Zhao Yunlei
9 April	Badminton Asia Championships (Draw): Host: Johor Bahru, Malaysia; Level: Continental Championships; Prize: $125,000; Format: 64MS/32WS/32MD/32WD/32XD	Score: 21–10, 21–11	
9 April	Badminton Asia Championships (Draw): Host: Johor Bahru, Malaysia; Level: Continental Championships; Prize: $125,000; Format: 64MS/32WS/32MD/32WD/32XD	(China) He Hanbin (China) Yu Yang	(China) Xu Chen (China) Zhao Tingting
9 April	Badminton Asia Championships (Draw): Host: Johor Bahru, Malaysia; Level: Continental Championships; Prize: $125,000; Format: 64MS/32WS/32MD/32WD/32XD	Score: 22–20, 21–15	
9 April	Dutch International: Host: Wateringen, Netherlands; Level: International Series; Prize: $10,000; Format: 32MS/32WS/32MD/32WD/32XD	(China) Wu Yunyong	(England) Rajiv Ouseph
9 April	Dutch International: Host: Wateringen, Netherlands; Level: International Series; Prize: $10,000; Format: 32MS/32WS/32MD/32WD/32XD	Score: 21–16, 21–16	
9 April	Dutch International: Host: Wateringen, Netherlands; Level: International Series; Prize: $10,000; Format: 32MS/32WS/32MD/32WD/32XD	(Estonia) Kati Tolmoff	(Ukraine) Larisa Griga
9 April	Dutch International: Host: Wateringen, Netherlands; Level: International Series; Prize: $10,000; Format: 32MS/32WS/32MD/32WD/32XD	Score: 12–21, 21–15, 22–20	
9 April	Dutch International: Host: Wateringen, Netherlands; Level: International Series; Prize: $10,000; Format: 32MS/32WS/32MD/32WD/32XD	(England) Kristian Roebuck (Scotland) Andrew Bowman	(England) Robert Adcock (England) Robin Middleton
9 April	Dutch International: Host: Wateringen, Netherlands; Level: International Series; Prize: $10,000; Format: 32MS/32WS/32MD/32WD/32XD	Score: 21–11, 21–9	
9 April	Dutch International: Host: Wateringen, Netherlands; Level: International Series; Prize: $10,000; Format: 32MS/32WS/32MD/32WD/32XD	(Netherlands) Rachel van Cutsen (Netherlands) Paulien van Dooremalen	(France) Elodie Eymard (France) Weny Rahmawati
9 April	Dutch International: Host: Wateringen, Netherlands; Level: International Series; Prize: $10,000; Format: 32MS/32WS/32MD/32WD/32XD	Score: 21–11, 21–8	
9 April	Dutch International: Host: Wateringen, Netherlands; Level: International Series; Prize: $10,000; Format: 32MS/32WS/32MD/32WD/32XD	(England) Robin Middleton (England) Liza Parker	(England) Kristian Roebuck (England) Natalie Munt
9 April	Dutch International: Host: Wateringen, Netherlands; Level: International Series; Prize: $10,000; Format: 32MS/32WS/32MD/32WD/32XD	Score: 17-21, 21–12, 21–15	
9 April	Peru International: Host: Lima, Peru; Level: Future Series; Format: 64MS/64WS/32MD/32WD/32XD	(Algeria) Nabil Lasmari	(Denmark) Sune Gavnholt
9 April	Peru International: Host: Lima, Peru; Level: Future Series; Format: 64MS/64WS/32MD/32WD/32XD	Score: 22–20, 22–20	
9 April	Peru International: Host: Lima, Peru; Level: Future Series; Format: 64MS/64WS/32MD/32WD/32XD	(Peru) Claudia Rivero	(Cuba) Leidis Mora
9 April	Peru International: Host: Lima, Peru; Level: Future Series; Format: 64MS/64WS/32MD/32WD/32XD	Score: 21–15, 21–9	
9 April	Peru International: Host: Lima, Peru; Level: Future Series; Format: 64MS/64WS/32MD/32WD/32XD	(Canada) Mike Beres (Canada) William Milroy	(Mexico) Jose Luis Gonzales (Mexico) Jesus Aguilar
9 April	Peru International: Host: Lima, Peru; Level: Future Series; Format: 64MS/64WS/32MD/32WD/32XD	Score: 21–17, 21–9	
9 April	Peru International: Host: Lima, Peru; Level: Future Series; Format: 64MS/64WS/32MD/32WD/32XD	(Peru) Cristina Aicardi (Peru) Claudia Rivero	(Peru) Jie Meng (Peru) Valeria Rivero
9 April	Peru International: Host: Lima, Peru; Level: Future Series; Format: 64MS/64WS/32MD/32WD/32XD	Score: 21–13, 21–17	
9 April	Peru International: Host: Lima, Peru; Level: Future Series; Format: 64MS/64WS/32MD/32WD/32XD	(Canada) Mike Beres (Canada) Valerie Loker	(Peru) Rodrigo Pacheco (Peru) Claudia Rivero
9 April	Peru International: Host: Lima, Peru; Level: Future Series; Format: 64MS/64WS/32MD/32WD/32XD	Score: 21–11, 21–14	
16 April	Miami Pan Am International: Host: Miami Lakes, Florida, United States; Level: Future Series; Format: 64MS/64WS/32MD/32WD/32XD	(Canada) Andrew Dabeka	(Myanmar) Lwin Aung
16 April	Miami Pan Am International: Host: Miami Lakes, Florida, United States; Level: Future Series; Format: 64MS/64WS/32MD/32WD/32XD	Score: 21–12, 21–14	
16 April	Miami Pan Am International: Host: Miami Lakes, Florida, United States; Level: Future Series; Format: 64MS/64WS/32MD/32WD/32XD	(Hong Kong) Zhou Mi	(Spain) Lucía Tavera
16 April	Miami Pan Am International: Host: Miami Lakes, Florida, United States; Level: Future Series; Format: 64MS/64WS/32MD/32WD/32XD	Score: 21–7, 21–6	
16 April	Miami Pan Am International: Host: Miami Lakes, Florida, United States; Level: Future Series; Format: 64MS/64WS/32MD/32WD/32XD	(Canada) Mike Beres (Canada) William Milroy	(United States) Khankham Malaythong (United States) Howard Bach
16 April	Miami Pan Am International: Host: Miami Lakes, Florida, United States; Level: Future Series; Format: 64MS/64WS/32MD/32WD/32XD	Score: 21–18, 21–19	
16 April	Miami Pan Am International: Host: Miami Lakes, Florida, United States; Level: Future Series; Format: 64MS/64WS/32MD/32WD/32XD	(United States) Jamie Subandhi (United States) Kuei Ya Chen	(Canada) Valerie Loker (Canada) Sarah MacMaster
16 April	Miami Pan Am International: Host: Miami Lakes, Florida, United States; Level: Future Series; Format: 64MS/64WS/32MD/32WD/32XD	Score: 21–19, 21–16	
16 April	Miami Pan Am International: Host: Miami Lakes, Florida, United States; Level: Future Series; Format: 64MS/64WS/32MD/32WD/32XD	(Canada) Mike Beres (Canada) Valerie Loker	(United States) Howard Bach (United States) Eva Lee
16 April	Miami Pan Am International: Host: Miami Lakes, Florida, United States; Level: Future Series; Format: 64MS/64WS/32MD/32WD/32XD	Score: 17–21, 21–23, 22–20	
16 April	Portugal International: Host: Caldas da Rainha, Portugal; Level: International Series; Prize: €2,500; Format: 32MS/32WS/32MD/32WD/32XD	(Denmark) Peter Mikkelsen	(Denmark) Michael Christensen
16 April	Portugal International: Host: Caldas da Rainha, Portugal; Level: International Series; Prize: €2,500; Format: 32MS/32WS/32MD/32WD/32XD	Score: 21–16, 21–17	
16 April	Portugal International: Host: Caldas da Rainha, Portugal; Level: International Series; Prize: €2,500; Format: 32MS/32WS/32MD/32WD/32XD	(Netherlands) Judith Meulendijks	(China) Li Wenyan
16 April	Portugal International: Host: Caldas da Rainha, Portugal; Level: International Series; Prize: €2,500; Format: 32MS/32WS/32MD/32WD/32XD	Score: 21–12, 21–15	
16 April	Portugal International: Host: Caldas da Rainha, Portugal; Level: International Series; Prize: €2,500; Format: 32MS/32WS/32MD/32WD/32XD	(Denmark) Mikkel Delbo Larsen (Denmark) Jacob Chemnitz	(England) Dean George (England) Chris Tonks
16 April	Portugal International: Host: Caldas da Rainha, Portugal; Level: International Series; Prize: €2,500; Format: 32MS/32WS/32MD/32WD/32XD	Score: 21–18, 21–17	
16 April	Portugal International: Host: Caldas da Rainha, Portugal; Level: International Series; Prize: €2,500; Format: 32MS/32WS/32MD/32WD/32XD	(England) Jenny Wallwork (England) Suzanne Rayappan	(England) Sarah Bok (England) Liza Parker
16 April	Portugal International: Host: Caldas da Rainha, Portugal; Level: International Series; Prize: €2,500; Format: 32MS/32WS/32MD/32WD/32XD	Score: 21–14, 21–15	
16 April	Portugal International: Host: Caldas da Rainha, Portugal; Level: International Series; Prize: €2,500; Format: 32MS/32WS/32MD/32WD/32XD	(Denmark) Rasmus Bonde (Denmark) Christinna Pedersen	(Denmark) Mikkel Delbo Larsen (Denmark) Mie Schjøtt-Kristensen
16 April	Portugal International: Host: Caldas da Rainha, Portugal; Level: International Series; Prize: €2,500; Format: 32MS/32WS/32MD/32WD/32XD	Score: 21–12, 21–6	
23 April	Hatzor International: Host: Hatzor, Israel; Level: International Series; Prize: $5,000; Format: 32MS/32WS/16MD/16XD	(Japan) Sho Sasaki	(Czech Republic) Petr Koukal
23 April	Hatzor International: Host: Hatzor, Israel; Level: International Series; Prize: $5,000; Format: 32MS/32WS/16MD/16XD	Score: 21–15, 21–16	
23 April	Hatzor International: Host: Hatzor, Israel; Level: International Series; Prize: $5,000; Format: 32MS/32WS/16MD/16XD	(England) Tracey Hallam	(Ukraine) Elena Prus
23 April	Hatzor International: Host: Hatzor, Israel; Level: International Series; Prize: $5,000; Format: 32MS/32WS/16MD/16XD	Score: 21–9, 21–15	
23 April	Hatzor International: Host: Hatzor, Israel; Level: International Series; Prize: $5,000; Format: 32MS/32WS/16MD/16XD	(Germany) Jochen Cassel (Germany) Thomas Tesche	(Bulgaria) Stilian Makarski (Bulgaria) Vladimir Metodiev
23 April	Hatzor International: Host: Hatzor, Israel; Level: International Series; Prize: $5,000; Format: 32MS/32WS/16MD/16XD	Score: 21–19, 21–13	
23 April	Hatzor International: Host: Hatzor, Israel; Level: International Series; Prize: $5,000; Format: 32MS/32WS/16MD/16XD	(Ukraine) Valeriy Atrashchenkov (Ukraine) Elena Prus	(Austria) Heimo Götschl (Austria) Claudia Mayer
23 April	Hatzor International: Host: Hatzor, Israel; Level: International Series; Prize: $5,000; Format: 32MS/32WS/16MD/16XD	Score: 21–16, 21–15	
23 April	Polish Open: Host: Spała, Poland; Level: International Series; Prize: $10,000; Format: 32MS/32WS/32MD/32WD/32XD	(Ukraine) Vladislav Druzchenko	(Denmark) Martin Bille Larsen
23 April	Polish Open: Host: Spała, Poland; Level: International Series; Prize: $10,000; Format: 32MS/32WS/32MD/32WD/32XD	Score: 17–21, 21–19, 21–11	
23 April	Polish Open: Host: Spała, Poland; Level: International Series; Prize: $10,000; Format: 32MS/32WS/32MD/32WD/32XD	(Japan) Chie Umezu	(Russia) Tatjana Bibik
23 April	Polish Open: Host: Spała, Poland; Level: International Series; Prize: $10,000; Format: 32MS/32WS/32MD/32WD/32XD	Score: 21–12, 21–7	
23 April	Polish Open: Host: Spała, Poland; Level: International Series; Prize: $10,000; Format: 32MS/32WS/32MD/32WD/32XD	(Denmark) Mikkel Delbo Larsen (Denmark) Jacob Chemnitz	(Germany) Johannes Schöttler (Germany) Tim Dettmann
23 April	Polish Open: Host: Spała, Poland; Level: International Series; Prize: $10,000; Format: 32MS/32WS/32MD/32WD/32XD	Score: 14–21, 21–17, 21–19	
23 April	Polish Open: Host: Spała, Poland; Level: International Series; Prize: $10,000; Format: 32MS/32WS/32MD/32WD/32XD	(Poland) Kamila Augustyn (Poland) Nadieżda Kostiuczyk	(Denmark) Christinna Pedersen (Denmark) Mie Schjøtt-Kristensen
23 April	Polish Open: Host: Spała, Poland; Level: International Series; Prize: $10,000; Format: 32MS/32WS/32MD/32WD/32XD	Score: 21–17, 21–14	
23 April	Polish Open: Host: Spała, Poland; Level: International Series; Prize: $10,000; Format: 32MS/32WS/32MD/32WD/32XD	(Poland) Robert Mateusiak (Poland) Nadieżda Kostiuczyk	(Germany) Tim Dettmann (Germany) Annekatrin Lillie
23 April	Polish Open: Host: Spała, Poland; Level: International Series; Prize: $10,000; Format: 32MS/32WS/32MD/32WD/32XD	Score: 21–19, 17–21, 21–19	
23 April	Kenya International: Host: Nairobi, Kenya; Level: Future Series; Format: 64MS/32WS/32MD/16WD/16XD	(Nigeria) Orobesa Okuonghae	(Nigeria) Akeem Ogunseye
23 April	Kenya International: Host: Nairobi, Kenya; Level: Future Series; Format: 64MS/32WS/32MD/16WD/16XD	Score: 21–7, 21–13	
23 April	Kenya International: Host: Nairobi, Kenya; Level: Future Series; Format: 64MS/32WS/32MD/16WD/16XD	(United States) Shannon Pohl	(Zambia) Ogar Siamupangila
23 April	Kenya International: Host: Nairobi, Kenya; Level: Future Series; Format: 64MS/32WS/32MD/16WD/16XD	Score: 21–19, 21–15	
23 April	Kenya International: Host: Nairobi, Kenya; Level: Future Series; Format: 64MS/32WS/32MD/16WD/16XD	(Nigeria) Abraham Otagada (Nigeria) Ocholi Edicha	(Nigeria) Kenneth Omoruyi (Nigeria) Olorunfemi Elewa
23 April	Kenya International: Host: Nairobi, Kenya; Level: Future Series; Format: 64MS/32WS/32MD/16WD/16XD	Score: 21–18, 12–21, 21–19	
23 April	Kenya International: Host: Nairobi, Kenya; Level: Future Series; Format: 64MS/32WS/32MD/16WD/16XD	(Zambia) Delphine Nakanyika (Zambia) Ogar Siamupangila	(Kenya) Anna Maina (Kenya) Irene Kerimah
23 April	Kenya International: Host: Nairobi, Kenya; Level: Future Series; Format: 64MS/32WS/32MD/16WD/16XD	Score: 21–14, 21–14	
23 April	Kenya International: Host: Nairobi, Kenya; Level: Future Series; Format: 64MS/32WS/32MD/16WD/16XD	(Nigeria) Orobesa Okuonghae (Zambia) Ogar Siamupangila	(Uganda) Abraham Kennedy Wogute (Uganda) Rita Namusisi
23 April	Kenya International: Host: Nairobi, Kenya; Level: Future Series; Format: 64MS/32WS/32MD/16WD/16XD	Score: 21–16, 21–16	

=== May ===
Week of	Tournament	Champions	Runners-up
1 May	Smiling Fish International: Host: Trang, Thailand; Level: International Series; Prize: $5,000; Format: 32MS/32WS/32MD/32WD/32XD	(Thailand) Poompat Sapkulchananart	(Thailand) Pakkawat Vilailak
1 May	Smiling Fish International: Host: Trang, Thailand; Level: International Series; Prize: $5,000; Format: 32MS/32WS/32MD/32WD/32XD	Score: 21–13, 21–13	
1 May	Smiling Fish International: Host: Trang, Thailand; Level: International Series; Prize: $5,000; Format: 32MS/32WS/32MD/32WD/32XD	(Thailand) Salakjit Ponsana	(Thailand) Soratja Chansrisukot
1 May	Smiling Fish International: Host: Trang, Thailand; Level: International Series; Prize: $5,000; Format: 32MS/32WS/32MD/32WD/32XD	Score: 12–21, 21–4, 21–14	
1 May	Smiling Fish International: Host: Trang, Thailand; Level: International Series; Prize: $5,000; Format: 32MS/32WS/32MD/32WD/32XD	(Hong Kong) Alroy Tanama Putra (Hong Kong) Hui Wai Ho	(Indonesia) Mohammad Ahsan (Indonesia) Bona Septano
1 May	Smiling Fish International: Host: Trang, Thailand; Level: International Series; Prize: $5,000; Format: 32MS/32WS/32MD/32WD/32XD	Score: 21–18, 21–18	
1 May	Smiling Fish International: Host: Trang, Thailand; Level: International Series; Prize: $5,000; Format: 32MS/32WS/32MD/32WD/32XD	(Indonesia) Richi Puspita Dili (Indonesia) Yulianti CJ	(Indonesia) Belaetrix Manuputi (Indonesia) Samantha Lintang
1 May	Smiling Fish International: Host: Trang, Thailand; Level: International Series; Prize: $5,000; Format: 32MS/32WS/32MD/32WD/32XD	Score: Walkover	
1 May	Smiling Fish International: Host: Trang, Thailand; Level: International Series; Prize: $5,000; Format: 32MS/32WS/32MD/32WD/32XD	(Indonesia) Tontowi Ahmad (Indonesia) Yulianti CJ	(Thailand) Thitipong Lapho (Thailand) Savitree Amitapai
1 May	Smiling Fish International: Host: Trang, Thailand; Level: International Series; Prize: $5,000; Format: 32MS/32WS/32MD/32WD/32XD	Score: 21–17, 17–21, 21–17	
1 May	Singapore Open (Draw): Host: Singapore; Level: Superseries; Prize: $200,000; Format: 32MS/32WS/32MD/32WD/32XD	(Thailand) Boonsak Ponsana	(China) Chen Yu
1 May	Singapore Open (Draw): Host: Singapore; Level: Superseries; Prize: $200,000; Format: 32MS/32WS/32MD/32WD/32XD	Score: 21–17, 21–14	
1 May	Singapore Open (Draw): Host: Singapore; Level: Superseries; Prize: $200,000; Format: 32MS/32WS/32MD/32WD/32XD	(China) Zhang Ning	(China) Xie Xingfang
1 May	Singapore Open (Draw): Host: Singapore; Level: Superseries; Prize: $200,000; Format: 32MS/32WS/32MD/32WD/32XD	Score: 21–18, 19–21, 21–3	
1 May	Singapore Open (Draw): Host: Singapore; Level: Superseries; Prize: $200,000; Format: 32MS/32WS/32MD/32WD/32XD	(China) Cai Yun (China) Fu Haifeng	(Malaysia) Choong Tan Fook (Malaysia) Lee Wan Wah
1 May	Singapore Open (Draw): Host: Singapore; Level: Superseries; Prize: $200,000; Format: 32MS/32WS/32MD/32WD/32XD	Score: 16–21, 24–22, 21–18	
1 May	Singapore Open (Draw): Host: Singapore; Level: Superseries; Prize: $200,000; Format: 32MS/32WS/32MD/32WD/32XD	(China) Zhang Yawen (China) Wei Yili	(China) Zhao Tingting (China) Yang Wei
1 May	Singapore Open (Draw): Host: Singapore; Level: Superseries; Prize: $200,000; Format: 32MS/32WS/32MD/32WD/32XD	Score: 10–21, 21–19, 21–18	
1 May	Singapore Open (Draw): Host: Singapore; Level: Superseries; Prize: $200,000; Format: 32MS/32WS/32MD/32WD/32XD	(Indonesia) Flandy Limpele (Indonesia) Vita Marissa	(Thailand) Sudket Prapakamol (Thailand) Saralee Thungthongkam
1 May	Singapore Open (Draw): Host: Singapore; Level: Superseries; Prize: $200,000; Format: 32MS/32WS/32MD/32WD/32XD	Score: 21–14, 21–13	
1 May	Samoa International: Host: Apia, Samoa; Level: Future Series; Format: 16MS/16WS/4MD/4WD/8XD	(Portugal) Marco Vasconcelos	(Australia) Ben Walklate
1 May	Samoa International: Host: Apia, Samoa; Level: Future Series; Format: 16MS/16WS/4MD/4WD/8XD	Score: 17–21, 21–12, 21–15	
1 May	Samoa International: Host: Apia, Samoa; Level: Future Series; Format: 16MS/16WS/4MD/4WD/8XD	(New Zealand) Michelle Chan	(New Zealand) Renee Flavell
1 May	Samoa International: Host: Apia, Samoa; Level: Future Series; Format: 16MS/16WS/4MD/4WD/8XD	Score: 21–11, 23–21	
1 May	Samoa International: Host: Apia, Samoa; Level: Future Series; Format: 16MS/16WS/4MD/4WD/8XD	(Samoa) Tupu Fua (Samoa) Sene Tokuma	(Samoa) Jensen Horice (Samoa) Carry Fiaputa
1 May	Samoa International: Host: Apia, Samoa; Level: Future Series; Format: 16MS/16WS/4MD/4WD/8XD	Score: 21–12, 21–10	
1 May	Samoa International: Host: Apia, Samoa; Level: Future Series; Format: 16MS/16WS/4MD/4WD/8XD	(Australia) Susan Dobson (Australia) Tania Luiz	(New Zealand) Renee Flavell (New Zealand) Michelle Chan
1 May	Samoa International: Host: Apia, Samoa; Level: Future Series; Format: 16MS/16WS/4MD/4WD/8XD	Score: 21–17, 11–21, 21–16	
1 May	Samoa International: Host: Apia, Samoa; Level: Future Series; Format: 16MS/16WS/4MD/4WD/8XD	(New Zealand) Craig Cooper (New Zealand) Renee Flavell	(Australia) Ben Walklate (Australia) Erin Carroll
1 May	Samoa International: Host: Apia, Samoa; Level: Future Series; Format: 16MS/16WS/4MD/4WD/8XD	Score: 21–4, 21–12	
7 May	Indonesia Open (Draw): Host: Jakarta, Indonesia; Level: Superseries; Prize: $250,000; Format: 32MS/32WS/32MD/32WD/32XD	(Malaysia) Lee Chong Wei	(China) Bao Chunlai
7 May	Indonesia Open (Draw): Host: Jakarta, Indonesia; Level: Superseries; Prize: $250,000; Format: 32MS/32WS/32MD/32WD/32XD	Score: 21–15, 21–16	
7 May	Indonesia Open (Draw): Host: Jakarta, Indonesia; Level: Superseries; Prize: $250,000; Format: 32MS/32WS/32MD/32WD/32XD	(Hong Kong) Wang Chen	(China) Zhu Lin
7 May	Indonesia Open (Draw): Host: Jakarta, Indonesia; Level: Superseries; Prize: $250,000; Format: 32MS/32WS/32MD/32WD/32XD	Score: 21–14, 21–13	
7 May	Indonesia Open (Draw): Host: Jakarta, Indonesia; Level: Superseries; Prize: $250,000; Format: 32MS/32WS/32MD/32WD/32XD	(China) Cai Yun (China) Fu Haifeng	(Malaysia) Mohd Zakry Abdul Latif (Malaysia) Mohd Fairuzizuan Mohd Tazari
7 May	Indonesia Open (Draw): Host: Jakarta, Indonesia; Level: Superseries; Prize: $250,000; Format: 32MS/32WS/32MD/32WD/32XD	Score: 21–17, 22–20	
7 May	Indonesia Open (Draw): Host: Jakarta, Indonesia; Level: Superseries; Prize: $250,000; Format: 32MS/32WS/32MD/32WD/32XD	(China) Du Jing (China) Yu Yang	(China) Zhao Tingting (China) Yang Wei
7 May	Indonesia Open (Draw): Host: Jakarta, Indonesia; Level: Superseries; Prize: $250,000; Format: 32MS/32WS/32MD/32WD/32XD	Score: 21–8, 16–21, 22–20	
7 May	Indonesia Open (Draw): Host: Jakarta, Indonesia; Level: Superseries; Prize: $250,000; Format: 32MS/32WS/32MD/32WD/32XD	(China) Zheng Bo (China) Gao Ling	(Indonesia) Nova Widianto (Indonesia) Liliyana Natsir
7 May	Indonesia Open (Draw): Host: Jakarta, Indonesia; Level: Superseries; Prize: $250,000; Format: 32MS/32WS/32MD/32WD/32XD	Score: 21–16, 21–11	
7 May	Fiji International: Host: Suva, Fiji; Level: Future Series; Format: 16MS/16WS/4MD/4WD/8XD	(Portugal) Marco Vasconcelos	(England) Nicholas Kidd
7 May	Fiji International: Host: Suva, Fiji; Level: Future Series; Format: 16MS/16WS/4MD/4WD/8XD	Score: 21–12, 19–21, 21–12	
7 May	Fiji International: Host: Suva, Fiji; Level: Future Series; Format: 16MS/16WS/4MD/4WD/8XD	(New Zealand) Michelle Chan	(Australia) Foong Meng Cheah
7 May	Fiji International: Host: Suva, Fiji; Level: Future Series; Format: 16MS/16WS/4MD/4WD/8XD	Score: 18–21, 21–15, 21–8	
7 May	Fiji International: Host: Suva, Fiji; Level: Future Series; Format: 16MS/16WS/4MD/4WD/8XD	(Fiji) Ryan Fong (Fiji) Burty Molia	(New Zealand) Craig Cooper (New Zealand) Blair Rutherford
7 May	Fiji International: Host: Suva, Fiji; Level: Future Series; Format: 16MS/16WS/4MD/4WD/8XD	Score: 17–21, 21–19, 21–11	
7 May	Fiji International: Host: Suva, Fiji; Level: Future Series; Format: 16MS/16WS/4MD/4WD/8XD	(New Zealand) Renee Flavell (New Zealand) Michelle Chan	(Australia) Susan Dobson (Australia) Tania Luiz
7 May	Fiji International: Host: Suva, Fiji; Level: Future Series; Format: 16MS/16WS/4MD/4WD/8XD	Score: 21–15, 21–15	
7 May	Fiji International: Host: Suva, Fiji; Level: Future Series; Format: 16MS/16WS/4MD/4WD/8XD	(New Zealand) Craig Cooper (New Zealand) Renee Flavell	(Australia) Ben Walklate (Australia) Erin Carroll
7 May	Fiji International: Host: Suva, Fiji; Level: Future Series; Format: 16MS/16WS/4MD/4WD/8XD	Score: 17–21, 21–14, 21–12	
14 May	Pan Am Badminton Championships (Draw): Host: Calgary, Canada; Level: Continental Championships; Format: 8XT/64MS/32WS/16MD/16WD/32XD	Canada	United States
14 May	Pan Am Badminton Championships (Draw): Host: Calgary, Canada; Level: Continental Championships; Format: 8XT/64MS/32WS/16MD/16WD/32XD	Score: 3–1	
14 May	Pan Am Badminton Championships (Draw): Host: Calgary, Canada; Level: Continental Championships; Format: 8XT/64MS/32WS/16MD/16WD/32XD	(Canada) Stephan Wojcikiewicz	(Canada) Andrew Dabeka
14 May	Pan Am Badminton Championships (Draw): Host: Calgary, Canada; Level: Continental Championships; Format: 8XT/64MS/32WS/16MD/16WD/32XD	Score: 21–17, 22–20	
14 May	Pan Am Badminton Championships (Draw): Host: Calgary, Canada; Level: Continental Championships; Format: 8XT/64MS/32WS/16MD/16WD/32XD	(Canada) Anna Rice	(Peru) Claudia Rivero
14 May	Pan Am Badminton Championships (Draw): Host: Calgary, Canada; Level: Continental Championships; Format: 8XT/64MS/32WS/16MD/16WD/32XD	Score: 21–16, 21–11	
14 May	Pan Am Badminton Championships (Draw): Host: Calgary, Canada; Level: Continental Championships; Format: 8XT/64MS/32WS/16MD/16WD/32XD	(Canada) Mike Beres (Canada) William Milroy	(United States) Khankham Malaythong (United States) Howard Bach
14 May	Pan Am Badminton Championships (Draw): Host: Calgary, Canada; Level: Continental Championships; Format: 8XT/64MS/32WS/16MD/16WD/32XD	Score: 21–13, 21–19	
14 May	Pan Am Badminton Championships (Draw): Host: Calgary, Canada; Level: Continental Championships; Format: 8XT/64MS/32WS/16MD/16WD/32XD	(Canada) Fiona McKee (Canada) Charmaine Reid	(United States) Mesinee Mangkalakiri (United States) Eva Lee
14 May	Pan Am Badminton Championships (Draw): Host: Calgary, Canada; Level: Continental Championships; Format: 8XT/64MS/32WS/16MD/16WD/32XD	Score: 22–20, 17–21, 21–18	
14 May	Pan Am Badminton Championships (Draw): Host: Calgary, Canada; Level: Continental Championships; Format: 8XT/64MS/32WS/16MD/16WD/32XD	(United States) Howard Bach (United States) Eva Lee	(Canada) Mike Beres (Canada) Valerie Loker
14 May	Pan Am Badminton Championships (Draw): Host: Calgary, Canada; Level: Continental Championships; Format: 8XT/64MS/32WS/16MD/16WD/32XD	Score: 21–18, 21–17	
14 May	New Zealand Open: Host: Auckland, New Zealand; Level: Grand Prix; Prize: $50,000; Format: 64MS/64WS/32MD/32WD/32XD	(Indonesia) Andre Kurniawan Tedjono	(Malaysia) Wong Choong Hann
14 May	New Zealand Open: Host: Auckland, New Zealand; Level: Grand Prix; Prize: $50,000; Format: 64MS/64WS/32MD/32WD/32XD	Score: 13–21, 21–18, 21–14	
14 May	New Zealand Open: Host: Auckland, New Zealand; Level: Grand Prix; Prize: $50,000; Format: 64MS/64WS/32MD/32WD/32XD	(Hong Kong) Zhou Mi	(Japan) Chie Umezu
14 May	New Zealand Open: Host: Auckland, New Zealand; Level: Grand Prix; Prize: $50,000; Format: 64MS/64WS/32MD/32WD/32XD	Score: 21–13, 21–10	
14 May	New Zealand Open: Host: Auckland, New Zealand; Level: Grand Prix; Prize: $50,000; Format: 64MS/64WS/32MD/32WD/32XD	(Malaysia) Chan Chong Ming (Malaysia) Hoon Thien How	(Hong Kong) Albert Susanto Njoto (Hong Kong) Yohan Hadikusuma Wiratama
14 May	New Zealand Open: Host: Auckland, New Zealand; Level: Grand Prix; Prize: $50,000; Format: 64MS/64WS/32MD/32WD/32XD	Score: 21–14, 20–22, 21–11	
14 May	New Zealand Open: Host: Auckland, New Zealand; Level: Grand Prix; Prize: $50,000; Format: 64MS/64WS/32MD/32WD/32XD	(Japan) Ikue Tatani (Japan) Aya Wakisaka	(Indonesia) Meiliana Jauhari (Indonesia) Shendy Puspa Irawati
14 May	New Zealand Open: Host: Auckland, New Zealand; Level: Grand Prix; Prize: $50,000; Format: 64MS/64WS/32MD/32WD/32XD	Score: 21–17, 15–21, 21–16	
14 May	New Zealand Open: Host: Auckland, New Zealand; Level: Grand Prix; Prize: $50,000; Format: 64MS/64WS/32MD/32WD/32XD	(Indonesia) Devin Lahardi Fitriawan (Indonesia) Lita Nurlita	(Indonesia) Anggun Nugroho (Indonesia) Nitya Krishinda Maheswari
14 May	New Zealand Open: Host: Auckland, New Zealand; Level: Grand Prix; Prize: $50,000; Format: 64MS/64WS/32MD/32WD/32XD	Score: 21–16, 21–15	
14 May	Mauritius International: Host: Rose Hill, Mauritius; Level: International Series; Prize: $7,500; Format: 64MS/32WS/16MD/16WD/16XD	(Japan) Sho Sasaki	(Denmark) Niels Christian Kaldau
14 May	Mauritius International: Host: Rose Hill, Mauritius; Level: International Series; Prize: $7,500; Format: 64MS/32WS/16MD/16WD/16XD	Score: 21–10, 21–13	
14 May	Mauritius International: Host: Rose Hill, Mauritius; Level: International Series; Prize: $7,500; Format: 64MS/32WS/16MD/16WD/16XD	(Italy) Agnese Allegrini	(Slovenia) Maja Tvrdy
14 May	Mauritius International: Host: Rose Hill, Mauritius; Level: International Series; Prize: $7,500; Format: 64MS/32WS/16MD/16WD/16XD	Score: 18–21, 21–9, 22–20	
14 May	Mauritius International: Host: Rose Hill, Mauritius; Level: International Series; Prize: $7,500; Format: 64MS/32WS/16MD/16WD/16XD	(Germany) Jochen Cassel (Germany) Thomas Tesche	(South Africa) Christoffel Dednam (South Africa) Roelof Dednam
14 May	Mauritius International: Host: Rose Hill, Mauritius; Level: International Series; Prize: $7,500; Format: 64MS/32WS/16MD/16WD/16XD	Score: 21–13, 21–14	
14 May	Mauritius International: Host: Rose Hill, Mauritius; Level: International Series; Prize: $7,500; Format: 64MS/32WS/16MD/16WD/16XD	(Slovenia) Maja Tvrdy (Portugal) Ana Moura	(South Africa) Michelle Edwards (South Africa) Chantal Botts
14 May	Mauritius International: Host: Rose Hill, Mauritius; Level: International Series; Prize: $7,500; Format: 64MS/32WS/16MD/16WD/16XD	Score: 21–16, 21–18	
14 May	Mauritius International: Host: Rose Hill, Mauritius; Level: International Series; Prize: $7,500; Format: 64MS/32WS/16MD/16WD/16XD	(South Africa) Christoffel Dednam (South Africa) Michelle Edwards	(Seychelles) Georgie Cupidon (Seychelles) Juliette Ah-Wan
14 May	Mauritius International: Host: Rose Hill, Mauritius; Level: International Series; Prize: $7,500; Format: 64MS/32WS/16MD/16WD/16XD	Score: 21–9, 21–17	
21 May	African Badminton Championships (Draw): Host: Rose Hill, Mauritius; Level: Continental Championships; Format: 8XT/64MS/32WS/32MD/16WD/32XD	Seychelles	South Africa
21 May	African Badminton Championships (Draw): Host: Rose Hill, Mauritius; Level: Continental Championships; Format: 8XT/64MS/32WS/32MD/16WD/32XD	Score: 3–2	
21 May	African Badminton Championships (Draw): Host: Rose Hill, Mauritius; Level: Continental Championships; Format: 8XT/64MS/32WS/32MD/16WD/32XD	(Algeria) Nabil Lasmari	(Zambia) Eli Mambwe
21 May	African Badminton Championships (Draw): Host: Rose Hill, Mauritius; Level: Continental Championships; Format: 8XT/64MS/32WS/32MD/16WD/32XD	Score: 21–16, 23–21	
21 May	African Badminton Championships (Draw): Host: Rose Hill, Mauritius; Level: Continental Championships; Format: 8XT/64MS/32WS/32MD/16WD/32XD	(Nigeria) Grace Daniel	(South Africa) Kerry-Lee Harrington
21 May	African Badminton Championships (Draw): Host: Rose Hill, Mauritius; Level: Continental Championships; Format: 8XT/64MS/32WS/32MD/16WD/32XD	Score: 21–16, 21–16	
21 May	African Badminton Championships (Draw): Host: Rose Hill, Mauritius; Level: Continental Championships; Format: 8XT/64MS/32WS/32MD/16WD/32XD	(South Africa) Christoffel Dednam (South Africa) Roelof Dednam	(Seychelles) Georgie Cupidon (Seychelles) Steve Malcouzane
21 May	African Badminton Championships (Draw): Host: Rose Hill, Mauritius; Level: Continental Championships; Format: 8XT/64MS/32WS/32MD/16WD/32XD	Score: 21–17, 21–16	
21 May	African Badminton Championships (Draw): Host: Rose Hill, Mauritius; Level: Continental Championships; Format: 8XT/64MS/32WS/32MD/16WD/32XD	(South Africa) Michelle Edwards (South Africa) Chantal Botts	(Nigeria) Grace Daniel (Mauritius) Kate Foo Kune
21 May	African Badminton Championships (Draw): Host: Rose Hill, Mauritius; Level: Continental Championships; Format: 8XT/64MS/32WS/32MD/16WD/32XD	Score: 21–19, 21–12	
21 May	African Badminton Championships (Draw): Host: Rose Hill, Mauritius; Level: Continental Championships; Format: 8XT/64MS/32WS/32MD/16WD/32XD	(Seychelles) Georgie Cupidon (Seychelles) Juliette Ah-Wan	(South Africa) Christoffel Dednam (South Africa) Michelle Edwards
21 May	African Badminton Championships (Draw): Host: Rose Hill, Mauritius; Level: Continental Championships; Format: 8XT/64MS/32WS/32MD/16WD/32XD	Score: 21–16, 11–21, 21–15	
21 May	Vietnam International: Host: Ho Chi Minh City, Vietnam; Level: International Challenge; Prize: $15,000; Format: 64MS/32WS/32MD/32WD/32XD	(Malaysia) Tan Chun Seang	(Indonesia) Ari Yuli Wahyu Hartanto
21 May	Vietnam International: Host: Ho Chi Minh City, Vietnam; Level: International Challenge; Prize: $15,000; Format: 64MS/32WS/32MD/32WD/32XD	Score: 21–16, 18–21, 21–14	
21 May	Vietnam International: Host: Ho Chi Minh City, Vietnam; Level: International Challenge; Prize: $15,000; Format: 64MS/32WS/32MD/32WD/32XD	(England) Tracey Hallam	(Indonesia) Maria Elfira Christina
21 May	Vietnam International: Host: Ho Chi Minh City, Vietnam; Level: International Challenge; Prize: $15,000; Format: 64MS/32WS/32MD/32WD/32XD	Score: 21–15, 21–15	
21 May	Vietnam International: Host: Ho Chi Minh City, Vietnam; Level: International Challenge; Prize: $15,000; Format: 64MS/32WS/32MD/32WD/32XD	(Indonesia) Mohammad Ahsan (Indonesia) Bona Septano	(South Korea) Cho Gun-woo (South Korea) Yoo Yeon-seong
21 May	Vietnam International: Host: Ho Chi Minh City, Vietnam; Level: International Challenge; Prize: $15,000; Format: 64MS/32WS/32MD/32WD/32XD	Score: 21–15, 21–19	
21 May	Vietnam International: Host: Ho Chi Minh City, Vietnam; Level: International Challenge; Prize: $15,000; Format: 64MS/32WS/32MD/32WD/32XD	(Indonesia) Richi Puspita Dili (Indonesia) Yulianti CJ	(South Korea) Ha Jung-eun (South Korea) Kim Min-jung
21 May	Vietnam International: Host: Ho Chi Minh City, Vietnam; Level: International Challenge; Prize: $15,000; Format: 64MS/32WS/32MD/32WD/32XD	Score: 21–17, 9–21, 21–16	
21 May	Vietnam International: Host: Ho Chi Minh City, Vietnam; Level: International Challenge; Prize: $15,000; Format: 64MS/32WS/32MD/32WD/32XD	(Indonesia) Tri Kusharyanto (Indonesia) Yunita Tetty	(Indonesia) Tontowi Ahmad (Indonesia) Yulianti CJ
21 May	Vietnam International: Host: Ho Chi Minh City, Vietnam; Level: International Challenge; Prize: $15,000; Format: 64MS/32WS/32MD/32WD/32XD	Score: 21–15, 21–17	
21 May	Spanish Open: Host: Madrid, Spain; Level: International Challenge; Prize: $15,000; Format: 64MS/64WS/32MD/32WD/32XD	(Denmark) Peter Mikkelsen	(Czech Republic) Jan Vondra
21 May	Spanish Open: Host: Madrid, Spain; Level: International Challenge; Prize: $15,000; Format: 64MS/64WS/32MD/32WD/32XD	Score: 21–9, 5–21, 21–15	
21 May	Spanish Open: Host: Madrid, Spain; Level: International Challenge; Prize: $15,000; Format: 64MS/64WS/32MD/32WD/32XD	(Germany) Juliane Schenk	(Netherlands) Judith Meulendijks
21 May	Spanish Open: Host: Madrid, Spain; Level: International Challenge; Prize: $15,000; Format: 64MS/64WS/32MD/32WD/32XD	Score: 21–19, 12–21, 21–14	
21 May	Spanish Open: Host: Madrid, Spain; Level: International Challenge; Prize: $15,000; Format: 64MS/64WS/32MD/32WD/32XD	(Denmark) Mathias Boe (Denmark) Carsten Mogensen	(England) Richard Eidestedt (England) Robin Middleton
21 May	Spanish Open: Host: Madrid, Spain; Level: International Challenge; Prize: $15,000; Format: 64MS/64WS/32MD/32WD/32XD	Score: 21–4, 21–10	
21 May	Spanish Open: Host: Madrid, Spain; Level: International Challenge; Prize: $15,000; Format: 64MS/64WS/32MD/32WD/32XD	(Germany) Juliane Schenk (Germany) Nicole Grether	(England) Natalie Munt (England) Joanne Nicholas
21 May	Spanish Open: Host: Madrid, Spain; Level: International Challenge; Prize: $15,000; Format: 64MS/64WS/32MD/32WD/32XD	Score: 21–11, 20–22, 25–23	
21 May	Spanish Open: Host: Madrid, Spain; Level: International Challenge; Prize: $15,000; Format: 64MS/64WS/32MD/32WD/32XD	(Denmark) Joachim Fischer Nielsen (Denmark) Britta Andersen	(Germany) Ingo Kindervater (Germany) Kathrin Piotrowski
21 May	Spanish Open: Host: Madrid, Spain; Level: International Challenge; Prize: $15,000; Format: 64MS/64WS/32MD/32WD/32XD	Score: 22–24, 22–20, 23–21	
21 May	Australian International: Host: Brisbane, Australia; Level: International Series; Prize: $5,000; Format: 64MS/32WS/16MD/16WD/16XD	(New Zealand) John Moody	(Portugal) Marco Vasconcelos
21 May	Australian International: Host: Brisbane, Australia; Level: International Series; Prize: $5,000; Format: 64MS/32WS/16MD/16WD/16XD	Score: 21–16, 22–20	
21 May	Australian International: Host: Brisbane, Australia; Level: International Series; Prize: $5,000; Format: 64MS/32WS/16MD/16WD/16XD	(Japan) Kanako Yonekura	(Japan) Chie Umezu
21 May	Australian International: Host: Brisbane, Australia; Level: International Series; Prize: $5,000; Format: 64MS/32WS/16MD/16WD/16XD	Score: 11–21, 21–11, 21–10	
21 May	Australian International: Host: Brisbane, Australia; Level: International Series; Prize: $5,000; Format: 64MS/32WS/16MD/16WD/16XD	(Australia) Aji Basuki Sindoro (Australia) Ashley Brehaut	(New Zealand) John Gordon (New Zealand) Daniel Shirley
21 May	Australian International: Host: Brisbane, Australia; Level: International Series; Prize: $5,000; Format: 64MS/32WS/16MD/16WD/16XD	Score: 21–19, 21–19	
21 May	Australian International: Host: Brisbane, Australia; Level: International Series; Prize: $5,000; Format: 64MS/32WS/16MD/16WD/16XD	(Japan) Aya Wakisaka (Japan) Ikue Tatani	(Japan) Michiko Kanagami (Japan) Noriko Okuma
21 May	Australian International: Host: Brisbane, Australia; Level: International Series; Prize: $5,000; Format: 64MS/32WS/16MD/16WD/16XD	Score: 22–20, 21–12	
21 May	Australian International: Host: Brisbane, Australia; Level: International Series; Prize: $5,000; Format: 64MS/32WS/16MD/16WD/16XD	(New Zealand) Craig Cooper (New Zealand) Renee Flavell	(Australia) Aji Basuki Sindoro (Australia) Peggy Lim
21 May	Australian International: Host: Brisbane, Australia; Level: International Series; Prize: $5,000; Format: 64MS/32WS/16MD/16WD/16XD	Score: 21–17, 26–24	
28 May	Cheers Asian Satellite: Host: Singapore; Level: International Series; Prize: $6,250; Format: 64MS/32WS/32MD/32WD/32XD	(Malaysia) Tan Chun Seang	(Malaysia) Chan Kwong Beng
28 May	Cheers Asian Satellite: Host: Singapore; Level: International Series; Prize: $6,250; Format: 64MS/32WS/32MD/32WD/32XD	Score: 17–21, 21–16, 21–10	
28 May	Cheers Asian Satellite: Host: Singapore; Level: International Series; Prize: $6,250; Format: 64MS/32WS/32MD/32WD/32XD	(South Korea) Jun Jae-youn	(South Korea) Bae Youn-joo
28 May	Cheers Asian Satellite: Host: Singapore; Level: International Series; Prize: $6,250; Format: 64MS/32WS/32MD/32WD/32XD	Score: 21–8, 21–8	
28 May	Cheers Asian Satellite: Host: Singapore; Level: International Series; Prize: $6,250; Format: 64MS/32WS/32MD/32WD/32XD	(Malaysia) Khoo Chung Chiat (Malaysia) Chang Hun Pin	(Indonesia) Mohammad Ahsan (Indonesia) Bona Septano
28 May	Cheers Asian Satellite: Host: Singapore; Level: International Series; Prize: $6,250; Format: 64MS/32WS/32MD/32WD/32XD	Score: 19–21, 21–10, 23–21	
28 May	Cheers Asian Satellite: Host: Singapore; Level: International Series; Prize: $6,250; Format: 64MS/32WS/32MD/32WD/32XD	(South Korea) Ha Jung-eun (South Korea) Kim Min-jung	(Indonesia) Richi Puspita Dili (Indonesia) Yulianti CJ
28 May	Cheers Asian Satellite: Host: Singapore; Level: International Series; Prize: $6,250; Format: 64MS/32WS/32MD/32WD/32XD	Score: 21–18, 21–12	
28 May	Cheers Asian Satellite: Host: Singapore; Level: International Series; Prize: $6,250; Format: 64MS/32WS/32MD/32WD/32XD	(South Korea) Cho Gun-woo (South Korea) Kim Min-jung	(South Korea) Yoo Yeon-seong (South Korea) Ha Jung-eun
28 May	Cheers Asian Satellite: Host: Singapore; Level: International Series; Prize: $6,250; Format: 64MS/32WS/32MD/32WD/32XD	Score: 21–19, 21–15	
28 May	Le Volant d'Or de Toulouse: Host: Blagnac, Toulouse, France; Level: International Challenge; Prize: $15,000; Format: 64MS/32WS/32MD/32WD/32XD	(Poland) Przemysław Wacha	(Czech Republic) Petr Koukal
28 May	Le Volant d'Or de Toulouse: Host: Blagnac, Toulouse, France; Level: International Challenge; Prize: $15,000; Format: 64MS/32WS/32MD/32WD/32XD	Score: 21–13, 21–17	
28 May	Le Volant d'Or de Toulouse: Host: Blagnac, Toulouse, France; Level: International Challenge; Prize: $15,000; Format: 64MS/32WS/32MD/32WD/32XD	(England) Tracey Hallam	(Canada) Anna Rice
28 May	Le Volant d'Or de Toulouse: Host: Blagnac, Toulouse, France; Level: International Challenge; Prize: $15,000; Format: 64MS/32WS/32MD/32WD/32XD	Score: 21–18, 21–15	
28 May	Le Volant d'Or de Toulouse: Host: Blagnac, Toulouse, France; Level: International Challenge; Prize: $15,000; Format: 64MS/32WS/32MD/32WD/32XD	(Denmark) Mathias Boe (Denmark) Carsten Mogensen	(Germany) Kristof Hopp (Germany) Ingo Kindervater
28 May	Le Volant d'Or de Toulouse: Host: Blagnac, Toulouse, France; Level: International Challenge; Prize: $15,000; Format: 64MS/32WS/32MD/32WD/32XD	Score: 22–24, 21–12, 21–9	
28 May	Le Volant d'Or de Toulouse: Host: Blagnac, Toulouse, France; Level: International Challenge; Prize: $15,000; Format: 64MS/32WS/32MD/32WD/32XD	(Sweden) Elin Bergblom (Sweden) Johanna Persson	(France) Elodie Eymard (France) Weny Rahmawati
28 May	Le Volant d'Or de Toulouse: Host: Blagnac, Toulouse, France; Level: International Challenge; Prize: $15,000; Format: 64MS/32WS/32MD/32WD/32XD	Score: 21–11, 21–15	
28 May	Le Volant d'Or de Toulouse: Host: Blagnac, Toulouse, France; Level: International Challenge; Prize: $15,000; Format: 64MS/32WS/32MD/32WD/32XD	(Germany) Ingo Kindervater (Germany) Kathrin Piotrowski	(Germany) Kristof Hopp (Germany) Birgit Overzier
28 May	Le Volant d'Or de Toulouse: Host: Blagnac, Toulouse, France; Level: International Challenge; Prize: $15,000; Format: 64MS/32WS/32MD/32WD/32XD	Score: 21–12, 16–21, 21–14	

=== June ===
Week of	Tournament	Champions	Runners-up
1 June	Kalev International: Host: Tallinn, Estonia; Level: Future Series; Format: 32MS/32WS/32MD/8WD/16XD	(Denmark) Kristian Nielsen	(Denmark) Kristian Midtgaard
1 June	Kalev International: Host: Tallinn, Estonia; Level: Future Series; Format: 32MS/32WS/32MD/8WD/16XD	Score: 21–8, 21–19	
1 June	Kalev International: Host: Tallinn, Estonia; Level: Future Series; Format: 32MS/32WS/32MD/8WD/16XD	(Estonia) Kati Tolmoff	(Germany) Carola Bott
1 June	Kalev International: Host: Tallinn, Estonia; Level: Future Series; Format: 32MS/32WS/32MD/8WD/16XD	Score: 21–12, 16–21, 21–16	
1 June	Kalev International: Host: Tallinn, Estonia; Level: Future Series; Format: 32MS/32WS/32MD/8WD/16XD	(Finland) Tuomas Nuorteva (Finland) Mikko Vikman	(Finland) Iwo Zakowski (Finland) Jesper von Hertzen
1 June	Kalev International: Host: Tallinn, Estonia; Level: Future Series; Format: 32MS/32WS/32MD/8WD/16XD	Score: 21–16, 21–13	
1 June	Kalev International: Host: Tallinn, Estonia; Level: Future Series; Format: 32MS/32WS/32MD/8WD/16XD	(Spain) Lucia Tavera (Spain) Sandra Chirlaque	(Lithuania) Akvilė Stapušaitytė (Poland) Anna Narel
1 June	Kalev International: Host: Tallinn, Estonia; Level: Future Series; Format: 32MS/32WS/32MD/8WD/16XD	Score: 22–20, 21–23, 21–18	
1 June	Kalev International: Host: Tallinn, Estonia; Level: Future Series; Format: 32MS/32WS/32MD/8WD/16XD	(Russia) Anton Nazarenko (Russia) Evgenia Antipova	(Austria) Heimo Götschl (Austria) Claudia Mayer
1 June	Kalev International: Host: Tallinn, Estonia; Level: Future Series; Format: 32MS/32WS/32MD/8WD/16XD	Score: 22–20, 12–21, 21–8	
4 June	Carebaco International: Host: Paramaribo, Suriname; Level: Future Series; Format: 32MS/32WS/16MD/16WD/32XD	(France) Brice Leverdez	(United States) Raju Rai
4 June	Carebaco International: Host: Paramaribo, Suriname; Level: Future Series; Format: 32MS/32WS/16MD/16WD/32XD	Score: 21–12, 21–17	
4 June	Carebaco International: Host: Paramaribo, Suriname; Level: Future Series; Format: 32MS/32WS/16MD/16WD/32XD	(Guatemala) Marlin Maldonado	(United States) Shannon Pohl
4 June	Carebaco International: Host: Paramaribo, Suriname; Level: Future Series; Format: 32MS/32WS/16MD/16WD/32XD	Score: 21–13, 21–12	
4 June	Carebaco International: Host: Paramaribo, Suriname; Level: Future Series; Format: 32MS/32WS/16MD/16WD/32XD	(Brazil) Paolo Von Scala (Brazil) Lucas Araújo	(Brazil) Guilherme Pardo (Brazil) Guilherme Kumasaka
4 June	Carebaco International: Host: Paramaribo, Suriname; Level: Future Series; Format: 32MS/32WS/16MD/16WD/32XD	Score: 21–12, 21–11	
4 June	Carebaco International: Host: Paramaribo, Suriname; Level: Future Series; Format: 32MS/32WS/16MD/16WD/32XD	(Brazil) Paula Pereira (Brazil) Thayse Cruz	(Suriname) Jill Sjauw Mook (Suriname) Mireille van Daal
4 June	Carebaco International: Host: Paramaribo, Suriname; Level: Future Series; Format: 32MS/32WS/16MD/16WD/32XD	Score: 21–13, 21–19	
4 June	Carebaco International: Host: Paramaribo, Suriname; Level: Future Series; Format: 32MS/32WS/16MD/16WD/32XD	(Brazil) Lucas Araújo (Brazil) Thayse Cruz	(Mexico) Jesus Aguilar (Mexico) Rossina Nuñez
4 June	Carebaco International: Host: Paramaribo, Suriname; Level: Future Series; Format: 32MS/32WS/16MD/16WD/32XD	Score: 21–18, 26–24	
June 11	Sudirman Cup (Draw): Host: Glasgow, Scotland; Level: World Mixed Team Championships; Format: 8 Teams (Round robin)	China	Indonesia
June 11	Sudirman Cup (Draw): Host: Glasgow, Scotland; Level: World Mixed Team Championships; Format: 8 Teams (Round robin)	Score: 3–0	
June 25	Europe Cup (Draw): Host: Amersfoort, Netherlands; Level: CC Team Championships (Club); Format: 14 Teams (Round robin)	(Russia) New League Primorye; Rooster: Evgenij Dremin, Sergey Lunev, Sergey Prusachenko, Stanislav Pukhov, Alexey Vasiliev, Evgenia Dimova, Anna Efremova, Irina Rusljakova, Valeria Sorokina, Nina Vislova	(Netherlands) BC Amersfoort; Rooster: Saber Afif, Jochem Hilberink, Erwin Janssen, Rick Janssen, Dicky Palyama, Eric Pang, Joéli Residay, Rik Top, Lotte Bruil-Jonathans, Larissa Griga, Cynthia Janssen, Eefje Muskens, Annemieke van de Kolk, Neeltje Willems, Paulien van Dooremalen, Yao Jie
June 25	Europe Cup (Draw): Host: Amersfoort, Netherlands; Level: CC Team Championships (Club); Format: 14 Teams (Round robin)	Score: 4–2	

=== July ===
Week of	Tournament	Champions	Runners-up
2 July	Thailand Open: Host: Bangkok, Thailand; Level: Grand Prix Gold; Prize: $120,000; Format: 64MS/32WS/32MD/32WD/32XD	(China) Chen Hong	(Thailand) Boonsak Ponsana
2 July	Thailand Open: Host: Bangkok, Thailand; Level: Grand Prix Gold; Prize: $120,000; Format: 64MS/32WS/32MD/32WD/32XD	Score: 21–14, 11–21, 23–21	
2 July	Thailand Open: Host: Bangkok, Thailand; Level: Grand Prix Gold; Prize: $120,000; Format: 64MS/32WS/32MD/32WD/32XD	(China) Zhu Lin	(Hong Kong) Zhou Mi
2 July	Thailand Open: Host: Bangkok, Thailand; Level: Grand Prix Gold; Prize: $120,000; Format: 64MS/32WS/32MD/32WD/32XD	Score: 20–22, 21–5, 21–4	
2 July	Thailand Open: Host: Bangkok, Thailand; Level: Grand Prix Gold; Prize: $120,000; Format: 64MS/32WS/32MD/32WD/32XD	(South Korea) Lee Jae-jin (South Korea) Hwang Ji-man	(South Korea) Jung Jae-sung (South Korea) Lee Yong-dae
2 July	Thailand Open: Host: Bangkok, Thailand; Level: Grand Prix Gold; Prize: $120,000; Format: 64MS/32WS/32MD/32WD/32XD	Score: 21–19, 19–21, 21–9	
2 July	Thailand Open: Host: Bangkok, Thailand; Level: Grand Prix Gold; Prize: $120,000; Format: 64MS/32WS/32MD/32WD/32XD	(China) Gao Ling (China) Huang Sui	(China) Du Jing (China) Yu Yang
2 July	Thailand Open: Host: Bangkok, Thailand; Level: Grand Prix Gold; Prize: $120,000; Format: 64MS/32WS/32MD/32WD/32XD	Score: Walkover	
2 July	Thailand Open: Host: Bangkok, Thailand; Level: Grand Prix Gold; Prize: $120,000; Format: 64MS/32WS/32MD/32WD/32XD	(China) He Hanbin (China) Yu Yang	(South Korea) Han Sang-hoon (South Korea) Hwang Yu-mi
2 July	Thailand Open: Host: Bangkok, Thailand; Level: Grand Prix Gold; Prize: $120,000; Format: 64MS/32WS/32MD/32WD/32XD	Score: 21–12, 21–14	
9 July	China Masters (Draw): Host: Chengdu, China; Level: Superseries; Prize: $250,000; Format: 32MS/32WS/32MD/32WD/32XD	(China) Lin Dan	(Malaysia) Wong Choong Hann
9 July	China Masters (Draw): Host: Chengdu, China; Level: Superseries; Prize: $250,000; Format: 32MS/32WS/32MD/32WD/32XD	Score: 21–19, 21–9	
9 July	China Masters (Draw): Host: Chengdu, China; Level: Superseries; Prize: $250,000; Format: 32MS/32WS/32MD/32WD/32XD	(China) Xie Xingfang	(China) Zhang Ning
9 July	China Masters (Draw): Host: Chengdu, China; Level: Superseries; Prize: $250,000; Format: 32MS/32WS/32MD/32WD/32XD	Score: 21–11, 8-21, 23–21	
9 July	China Masters (Draw): Host: Chengdu, China; Level: Superseries; Prize: $250,000; Format: 32MS/32WS/32MD/32WD/32XD	(China) Cai Yun (China) Fu Haifeng	(Indonesia) Markis Kido (Indonesia) Hendra Setiawan
9 July	China Masters (Draw): Host: Chengdu, China; Level: Superseries; Prize: $250,000; Format: 32MS/32WS/32MD/32WD/32XD	Score: 21–15, 21–16	
9 July	China Masters (Draw): Host: Chengdu, China; Level: Superseries; Prize: $250,000; Format: 32MS/32WS/32MD/32WD/32XD	(Indonesia) Liliyana Natsir (Indonesia) Vita Marissa	(China) Zhao Tingting (China) Yang Wei
9 July	China Masters (Draw): Host: Chengdu, China; Level: Superseries; Prize: $250,000; Format: 32MS/32WS/32MD/32WD/32XD	Score: 12–21, 21–15, 21–16	
9 July	China Masters (Draw): Host: Chengdu, China; Level: Superseries; Prize: $250,000; Format: 32MS/32WS/32MD/32WD/32XD	(China) Zheng Bo (China) Gao Ling	(England) Anthony Clark (England) Donna Kellogg
9 July	China Masters (Draw): Host: Chengdu, China; Level: Superseries; Prize: $250,000; Format: 32MS/32WS/32MD/32WD/32XD	Score: 21–16, 21–17	
9 July	White Nights: Host: Saint Petersburg, Russia; Level: International Challenge; Prize: $15,000; Format: 32MS/32WS/16MD/8WD/16XD	(Russia) Stanislav Pukhov	(Canada) Bobby Milroy
9 July	White Nights: Host: Saint Petersburg, Russia; Level: International Challenge; Prize: $15,000; Format: 32MS/32WS/16MD/8WD/16XD	Score: 24–22, 11–21, 21–19	
9 July	White Nights: Host: Saint Petersburg, Russia; Level: International Challenge; Prize: $15,000; Format: 32MS/32WS/16MD/8WD/16XD	(Japan) Kanako Yonekura	(Belarus) Olga Konon
9 July	White Nights: Host: Saint Petersburg, Russia; Level: International Challenge; Prize: $15,000; Format: 32MS/32WS/16MD/8WD/16XD	Score: 21–11, 21–7	
9 July	White Nights: Host: Saint Petersburg, Russia; Level: International Challenge; Prize: $15,000; Format: 32MS/32WS/16MD/8WD/16XD	(Russia) Vitalij Durkin (Russia) Aleksandr Nikolaenko	(Germany) Jochen Cassel (Germany) Thomas Tesche
9 July	White Nights: Host: Saint Petersburg, Russia; Level: International Challenge; Prize: $15,000; Format: 32MS/32WS/16MD/8WD/16XD	Score: 21–17, 21–15	
9 July	White Nights: Host: Saint Petersburg, Russia; Level: International Challenge; Prize: $15,000; Format: 32MS/32WS/16MD/8WD/16XD	(Russia) Ekaterina Ananina (Russia) Anastasia Russkikh	(Russia) Valeria Sorokina (Russia) Nina Vislova
9 July	White Nights: Host: Saint Petersburg, Russia; Level: International Challenge; Prize: $15,000; Format: 32MS/32WS/16MD/8WD/16XD	Score: 21–15, 21–14	
9 July	White Nights: Host: Saint Petersburg, Russia; Level: International Challenge; Prize: $15,000; Format: 32MS/32WS/16MD/8WD/16XD	(Russia) Aleksandr Nikolaenko (Russia) Nina Vislova	(Russia) Nikolai Ukk (Russia) Tatjana Bibik
9 July	White Nights: Host: Saint Petersburg, Russia; Level: International Challenge; Prize: $15,000; Format: 32MS/32WS/16MD/8WD/16XD	Score: 21–17, 21–14	
9 July	Victorian International: Host: Melbourne, Australia; Level: International Series; Prize: $5,000; Format: 32MS/32WS/32MD/32WD/32XD	(Japan) Sho Sasaki	(Japan) Yousuke Nakanishi
9 July	Victorian International: Host: Melbourne, Australia; Level: International Series; Prize: $5,000; Format: 32MS/32WS/32MD/32WD/32XD	Score: 21–10, 21–9	
9 July	Victorian International: Host: Melbourne, Australia; Level: International Series; Prize: $5,000; Format: 32MS/32WS/32MD/32WD/32XD	(Ukraine) Larisa Griga	(Iceland) Ragna Ingólfsdóttir
9 July	Victorian International: Host: Melbourne, Australia; Level: International Series; Prize: $5,000; Format: 32MS/32WS/32MD/32WD/32XD	Score: 21–11, 21–10	
9 July	Victorian International: Host: Melbourne, Australia; Level: International Series; Prize: $5,000; Format: 32MS/32WS/32MD/32WD/32XD	(Japan) Kenichi Hayakawa (Japan) Kenta Kazuno	(Australia) Chad Whitehead (Australia) Mark Prior
9 July	Victorian International: Host: Melbourne, Australia; Level: International Series; Prize: $5,000; Format: 32MS/32WS/32MD/32WD/32XD	Score: 21–7, 21–15	
9 July	Victorian International: Host: Melbourne, Australia; Level: International Series; Prize: $5,000; Format: 32MS/32WS/32MD/32WD/32XD	(Malaysia) Lim Pek Siah (Malaysia) Haw Chiou Hwee	(New Zealand) Renee Flavell (New Zealand) Donna Cranston
9 July	Victorian International: Host: Melbourne, Australia; Level: International Series; Prize: $5,000; Format: 32MS/32WS/32MD/32WD/32XD	Score: 21–8, 21–14	
9 July	Victorian International: Host: Melbourne, Australia; Level: International Series; Prize: $5,000; Format: 32MS/32WS/32MD/32WD/32XD	(New Zealand) Craig Cooper (New Zealand) Renee Flavell	(Australia) Murray Hocking (Australia) Kate Wilson-Smith
9 July	Victorian International: Host: Melbourne, Australia; Level: International Series; Prize: $5,000; Format: 32MS/32WS/32MD/32WD/32XD	Score: 22–20, 21–17	
9 July	All African Games (Draw): Host: Algiers, Algeria; Level: Multi-sport event	Nigeria	South Africa
9 July	All African Games (Draw): Host: Algiers, Algeria; Level: Multi-sport event	Score: 3–0	
9 July	All African Games (Draw): Host: Algiers, Algeria; Level: Multi-sport event	(Algeria) Nabil Lasmari	(Zambia) Eli Mambwe
9 July	All African Games (Draw): Host: Algiers, Algeria; Level: Multi-sport event	Score: 21–17, 21–13	
9 July	All African Games (Draw): Host: Algiers, Algeria; Level: Multi-sport event	(Nigeria) Grace Daniel	(South Africa) Michelle Edwards
9 July	All African Games (Draw): Host: Algiers, Algeria; Level: Multi-sport event	Score: 21–16, 21–14	
9 July	All African Games (Draw): Host: Algiers, Algeria; Level: Multi-sport event	(South Africa) Chris Dednam (South Africa) Roelof Dednam	(South Africa) Dorian James (South Africa) Willem Viljoen
9 July	All African Games (Draw): Host: Algiers, Algeria; Level: Multi-sport event	Score: 21–10, 21–15	
9 July	All African Games (Draw): Host: Algiers, Algeria; Level: Multi-sport event	(South Africa) Michelle Edwards (South Africa) Chantal Botts	(Nigeria) Grace Daniel (Nigeria) Susan Ideh
9 July	All African Games (Draw): Host: Algiers, Algeria; Level: Multi-sport event	Score: 21–12, 9–21, 22–20	
9 July	All African Games (Draw): Host: Algiers, Algeria; Level: Multi-sport event	(Seychelles) Georgie Cupidon (Seychelles) Juliette Ah-Wan	(Nigeria) Greg Okuonghae (Nigeria) Grace Daniel
9 July	All African Games (Draw): Host: Algiers, Algeria; Level: Multi-sport event	Score: 21–14, 21–17	
9 July	Pan American Games (Draw): Host: Rio de Janeiro, Brazil; Level: Multi-sport event; Format: 32MS/32WS/32MD/16WD/32XD	(Canada) Mike Beres	(Guatemala) Kevin Cordón
9 July	Pan American Games (Draw): Host: Rio de Janeiro, Brazil; Level: Multi-sport event; Format: 32MS/32WS/32MD/16WD/32XD	Score: 13–21, 21–11, 21–10	
9 July	Pan American Games (Draw): Host: Rio de Janeiro, Brazil; Level: Multi-sport event; Format: 32MS/32WS/32MD/16WD/32XD	(United States) Eva Lee	(Canada) Charmaine Reid
9 July	Pan American Games (Draw): Host: Rio de Janeiro, Brazil; Level: Multi-sport event; Format: 32MS/32WS/32MD/16WD/32XD	Score: 21–14, 21–18	
9 July	Pan American Games (Draw): Host: Rio de Janeiro, Brazil; Level: Multi-sport event; Format: 32MS/32WS/32MD/16WD/32XD	(Canada) Mike Beres (Canada) William Milroy	(United States) Howard Bach (United States) Bob Malaythong
9 July	Pan American Games (Draw): Host: Rio de Janeiro, Brazil; Level: Multi-sport event; Format: 32MS/32WS/32MD/16WD/32XD	Score: 22–20, 21–13	
9 July	Pan American Games (Draw): Host: Rio de Janeiro, Brazil; Level: Multi-sport event; Format: 32MS/32WS/32MD/16WD/32XD	(United States) Eva Lee (United States) Mesinee Mangkalakiri	(Canada) Fiona McKee (Canada) Charmaine Reid
9 July	Pan American Games (Draw): Host: Rio de Janeiro, Brazil; Level: Multi-sport event; Format: 32MS/32WS/32MD/16WD/32XD	Score: 21–14, 21–15	
9 July	Pan American Games (Draw): Host: Rio de Janeiro, Brazil; Level: Multi-sport event; Format: 32MS/32WS/32MD/16WD/32XD	(United States) Howard Bach (United States) Eva Lee	(Canada) Mike Beres (Canada) Valerie Loker
9 July	Pan American Games (Draw): Host: Rio de Janeiro, Brazil; Level: Multi-sport event; Format: 32MS/32WS/32MD/16WD/32XD	Score: 21–19, 21–18	
16 July	Philippines Open: Host: Manila, Philippines; Level: Grand Prix Gold; Prize: $120,000; Format: 64MS/32WS/32MD/32WD/32XD	(Malaysia) Lee Chong Wei	(China) Chen Hong
16 July	Philippines Open: Host: Manila, Philippines; Level: Grand Prix Gold; Prize: $120,000; Format: 64MS/32WS/32MD/32WD/32XD	Score: 21–9, 21–15	
16 July	Philippines Open: Host: Manila, Philippines; Level: Grand Prix Gold; Prize: $120,000; Format: 64MS/32WS/32MD/32WD/32XD	(Hong Kong) Zhou Mi	(China) Zhu Jingjing
16 July	Philippines Open: Host: Manila, Philippines; Level: Grand Prix Gold; Prize: $120,000; Format: 64MS/32WS/32MD/32WD/32XD	Score: 21–18, 21–12	
16 July	Philippines Open: Host: Manila, Philippines; Level: Grand Prix Gold; Prize: $120,000; Format: 64MS/32WS/32MD/32WD/32XD	(Malaysia) Koo Kien Keat (Malaysia) Tan Boon Heong	(China) Guo Zhendong (China) Xie Zhongbo
16 July	Philippines Open: Host: Manila, Philippines; Level: Grand Prix Gold; Prize: $120,000; Format: 64MS/32WS/32MD/32WD/32XD	Score: 21–8, 26–24	
16 July	Philippines Open: Host: Manila, Philippines; Level: Grand Prix Gold; Prize: $120,000; Format: 64MS/32WS/32MD/32WD/32XD	(Chinese Taipei) Chien Yu-chin (Chinese Taipei) Cheng Wen-hsing	(China) Pan Pan (China) Tian Qing
16 July	Philippines Open: Host: Manila, Philippines; Level: Grand Prix Gold; Prize: $120,000; Format: 64MS/32WS/32MD/32WD/32XD	Score: 22–20, 21–14	
16 July	Philippines Open: Host: Manila, Philippines; Level: Grand Prix Gold; Prize: $120,000; Format: 64MS/32WS/32MD/32WD/32XD	(Indonesia) Nova Widianto (Indonesia) Liliyana Natsir	(South Korea) Han Sang-hoon (South Korea) Hwang Yu-mi
16 July	Philippines Open: Host: Manila, Philippines; Level: Grand Prix Gold; Prize: $120,000; Format: 64MS/32WS/32MD/32WD/32XD	Score: 21–17, 21–13	
16 July	North Shore City International: Host: Auckland, New Zealand; Level: International Series; Prize: $5,000; Format: 64MS/64WS/32MD/32WD/64XD	(France) Erwin Kehlhoffner	(New Zealand) John Moody
16 July	North Shore City International: Host: Auckland, New Zealand; Level: International Series; Prize: $5,000; Format: 64MS/64WS/32MD/32WD/64XD	Score: 21–16, 21–18	
16 July	North Shore City International: Host: Auckland, New Zealand; Level: International Series; Prize: $5,000; Format: 64MS/64WS/32MD/32WD/64XD	(Ukraine) Larisa Griga	(Vietnam) Lê Ngọc Nguyên Nhung
16 July	North Shore City International: Host: Auckland, New Zealand; Level: International Series; Prize: $5,000; Format: 64MS/64WS/32MD/32WD/64XD	Score: 21–19, 21–14	
16 July	North Shore City International: Host: Auckland, New Zealand; Level: International Series; Prize: $5,000; Format: 64MS/64WS/32MD/32WD/64XD	(New Zealand) John Moody (New Zealand) Alan Chan	(New Zealand) Nathan Hannam (New Zealand) Henry Tam
16 July	North Shore City International: Host: Auckland, New Zealand; Level: International Series; Prize: $5,000; Format: 64MS/64WS/32MD/32WD/64XD	Score: 18–21, 21–14, 21–9	
16 July	North Shore City International: Host: Auckland, New Zealand; Level: International Series; Prize: $5,000; Format: 64MS/64WS/32MD/32WD/64XD	(Republic of Ireland) Chloe Magee (Republic of Ireland) Bing Huang	(New Zealand) Catherine Moody (Vietnam) Lê Ngọc Nguyên Nhung
16 July	North Shore City International: Host: Auckland, New Zealand; Level: International Series; Prize: $5,000; Format: 64MS/64WS/32MD/32WD/64XD	Score: 21–15, 16–21, 21–15	
16 July	North Shore City International: Host: Auckland, New Zealand; Level: International Series; Prize: $5,000; Format: 64MS/64WS/32MD/32WD/64XD	(Spain) Carlos Longo (Spain) Laura Molina	(New Zealand) Joe Wu (New Zealand) Belinda Hill
16 July	North Shore City International: Host: Auckland, New Zealand; Level: International Series; Prize: $5,000; Format: 64MS/64WS/32MD/32WD/64XD	Score: 21–15, 21–18	
23 July	Nouméa International: Host: Nouméa, New Caledonia; Level: Future Series; Prize: $1,500; Format: 32MS/32WS/16MD/16WD/16XD	(India) Arvind Bhat	(Spain) Pablo Abian
23 July	Nouméa International: Host: Nouméa, New Caledonia; Level: Future Series; Prize: $1,500; Format: 32MS/32WS/16MD/16WD/16XD	Score: 21–16, 17–21, 21–19	
23 July	Nouméa International: Host: Nouméa, New Caledonia; Level: Future Series; Prize: $1,500; Format: 32MS/32WS/16MD/16WD/16XD	(Czech Republic) Kristína Ludíková	(Vietnam) Lê Ngọc Nguyên Nhung
23 July	Nouméa International: Host: Nouméa, New Caledonia; Level: Future Series; Prize: $1,500; Format: 32MS/32WS/16MD/16WD/16XD	Score: no data	
23 July	Nouméa International: Host: Nouméa, New Caledonia; Level: Future Series; Prize: $1,500; Format: 32MS/32WS/16MD/16WD/16XD	(India) Ajiy Wijetilekk (India) Arvind Bhat	(New Zealand) Daniel Forrest (New Zealand) Nathan Hannam
23 July	Nouméa International: Host: Nouméa, New Caledonia; Level: Future Series; Prize: $1,500; Format: 32MS/32WS/16MD/16WD/16XD	Score: 22–20, 21–14	
23 July	Nouméa International: Host: Nouméa, New Caledonia; Level: Future Series; Prize: $1,500; Format: 32MS/32WS/16MD/16WD/16XD	(Denmark) Line Isberg (New Zealand) Belinda Hill	(United States) Lauren Todt (United States) Jennifer Coleman
23 July	Nouméa International: Host: Nouméa, New Caledonia; Level: Future Series; Prize: $1,500; Format: 32MS/32WS/16MD/16WD/16XD	Score: no data	
23 July	Nouméa International: Host: Nouméa, New Caledonia; Level: Future Series; Prize: $1,500; Format: 32MS/32WS/16MD/16WD/16XD	(Spain) Carlos Longo (Spain) Laura Molina	(New Caledonia) Marc-Antoine Desaymoz (New Caledonia) Johanna Kou
23 July	Nouméa International: Host: Nouméa, New Caledonia; Level: Future Series; Prize: $1,500; Format: 32MS/32WS/16MD/16WD/16XD	Score: no data	

=== August ===
Week of	Tournament	Champions	Runners-up
6 August	Summer Universiade: Host: Bangkok, Thailand; Level: FISU Multi-sport event	Thailand	China
6 August	Summer Universiade: Host: Bangkok, Thailand; Level: FISU Multi-sport event	Score: 3–2	
6 August	Summer Universiade: Host: Bangkok, Thailand; Level: FISU Multi-sport event	(Thailand) Boonsak Ponsana	(China) Chen Hong
6 August	Summer Universiade: Host: Bangkok, Thailand; Level: FISU Multi-sport event	Score: 17–21, 21–15, 21–17	
6 August	Summer Universiade: Host: Bangkok, Thailand; Level: FISU Multi-sport event	(China) Wang Yihan	(Chinese Taipei) Cheng Shao-chieh
6 August	Summer Universiade: Host: Bangkok, Thailand; Level: FISU Multi-sport event	Score: 21–12, 21–17	
6 August	Summer Universiade: Host: Bangkok, Thailand; Level: FISU Multi-sport event	(Thailand) Sudket Prapakamol (Thailand) Phattapol Ngensrisuk	(Chinese Taipei) Tsai Chia-hsin (Chinese Taipei) Hsieh Yu-hsing
6 August	Summer Universiade: Host: Bangkok, Thailand; Level: FISU Multi-sport event	Score: 17–21, 21–17, 21–14	
6 August	Summer Universiade: Host: Bangkok, Thailand; Level: FISU Multi-sport event	(Chinese Taipei) Chien Yu-chin (Chinese Taipei) Cheng Wen-hsing	(China) Pan Pan (China) Tian Qing
6 August	Summer Universiade: Host: Bangkok, Thailand; Level: FISU Multi-sport event	Score: 21–9, 21–13	
6 August	Summer Universiade: Host: Bangkok, Thailand; Level: FISU Multi-sport event	(South Korea) Yoo Yeon-seong (South Korea) Kim Min-jung	(Chinese Taipei) Fang Chieh-min (Chinese Taipei) Cheng Wen-hsing
6 August	Summer Universiade: Host: Bangkok, Thailand; Level: FISU Multi-sport event	Score: 21–19, 13–21, 21–17	
13 August	World Championships (Draw): Host: Kuala Lumpur, Malaysia; Level: BWF Major Event; Format: 64MS/64WS/64MD/64WD/64XD	(China) Lin Dan	(Indonesia) Sony Dwi Kuncoro
13 August	World Championships (Draw): Host: Kuala Lumpur, Malaysia; Level: BWF Major Event; Format: 64MS/64WS/64MD/64WD/64XD	Score: 21–11, 22–20	
13 August	World Championships (Draw): Host: Kuala Lumpur, Malaysia; Level: BWF Major Event; Format: 64MS/64WS/64MD/64WD/64XD	(China) Zhu Lin	(Hong Kong) Wang Chen
13 August	World Championships (Draw): Host: Kuala Lumpur, Malaysia; Level: BWF Major Event; Format: 64MS/64WS/64MD/64WD/64XD	Score: 21–8, 21–12	
13 August	World Championships (Draw): Host: Kuala Lumpur, Malaysia; Level: BWF Major Event; Format: 64MS/64WS/64MD/64WD/64XD	(Indonesia) Markis Kido (Indonesia) Hendra Setiawan	(South Korea) Jung Jae-sung (South Korea) Lee Yong-dae
13 August	World Championships (Draw): Host: Kuala Lumpur, Malaysia; Level: BWF Major Event; Format: 64MS/64WS/64MD/64WD/64XD	Score: 21–19, 21–19	
13 August	World Championships (Draw): Host: Kuala Lumpur, Malaysia; Level: BWF Major Event; Format: 64MS/64WS/64MD/64WD/64XD	(China) Yang Wei (China) Zhang Jiewen	(China) Gao Ling (China) Huang Sui
13 August	World Championships (Draw): Host: Kuala Lumpur, Malaysia; Level: BWF Major Event; Format: 64MS/64WS/64MD/64WD/64XD	Score: 21–16, 21–19	
13 August	World Championships (Draw): Host: Kuala Lumpur, Malaysia; Level: BWF Major Event; Format: 64MS/64WS/64MD/64WD/64XD	(Indonesia) Nova Widianto (Indonesia) Liliyana Natsir	(China) Zheng Bo (China) Gao Ling
13 August	World Championships (Draw): Host: Kuala Lumpur, Malaysia; Level: BWF Major Event; Format: 64MS/64WS/64MD/64WD/64XD	Score: 21–16, 21–14	
27 August	Indonesia International: Host: Surabaya, Indonesia; Level: International Challenge; Prize: $15,000; Format: 64MS/32WS/64MD/32WD/32XD	(South Korea) Hong Ji-hoon	(South Korea) Lee Cheol-ho
27 August	Indonesia International: Host: Surabaya, Indonesia; Level: International Challenge; Prize: $15,000; Format: 64MS/32WS/64MD/32WD/32XD	Score: 21–15, 11–21, 21–11	
27 August	Indonesia International: Host: Surabaya, Indonesia; Level: International Challenge; Prize: $15,000; Format: 64MS/32WS/64MD/32WD/32XD	(Chinese Taipei) Chiu Yi-ju	(Japan) Megumi Taruno
27 August	Indonesia International: Host: Surabaya, Indonesia; Level: International Challenge; Prize: $15,000; Format: 64MS/32WS/64MD/32WD/32XD	Score: 21–18, 21–14	
27 August	Indonesia International: Host: Surabaya, Indonesia; Level: International Challenge; Prize: $15,000; Format: 64MS/32WS/64MD/32WD/32XD	(Indonesia) Rian Sukmawan (Indonesia) Yonathan Suryatama Dasuki	(Indonesia) Ade Lukas (Indonesia) Fran Kurniawan
27 August	Indonesia International: Host: Surabaya, Indonesia; Level: International Challenge; Prize: $15,000; Format: 64MS/32WS/64MD/32WD/32XD	Score: 21–18, 21–17	
27 August	Indonesia International: Host: Surabaya, Indonesia; Level: International Challenge; Prize: $15,000; Format: 64MS/32WS/64MD/32WD/32XD	(Indonesia) Shendy Puspa Irawati (Indonesia) Meiliana Jauhari	(Japan) Shizuka Matsuo (Japan) Yasuyo Imabeppu
27 August	Indonesia International: Host: Surabaya, Indonesia; Level: International Challenge; Prize: $15,000; Format: 64MS/32WS/64MD/32WD/32XD	Score: 15–21, 21–15, 21–17	
27 August	Indonesia International: Host: Surabaya, Indonesia; Level: International Challenge; Prize: $15,000; Format: 64MS/32WS/64MD/32WD/32XD	(Indonesia) Tontowi Ahmad (Indonesia) Yulianti CJ	(South Korea) Yoo Yeon-seong (South Korea) Kim Min-jung
27 August	Indonesia International: Host: Surabaya, Indonesia; Level: International Challenge; Prize: $15,000; Format: 64MS/32WS/64MD/32WD/32XD	Score: 21–16, 15–21, 21–9	
27 August	U.S. Open: Host: Los Angeles, United States; Level: Grand Prix; Prize: $50,000; Format: 64MS/32WS/32MD/32WD/32XD	(Malaysia) Lee Tsuen Seng	(Japan) Yousuke Nakanishi
27 August	U.S. Open: Host: Los Angeles, United States; Level: Grand Prix; Prize: $50,000; Format: 64MS/32WS/32MD/32WD/32XD	Score: 21–14, 21–10	
27 August	U.S. Open: Host: Los Angeles, United States; Level: Grand Prix; Prize: $50,000; Format: 64MS/32WS/32MD/32WD/32XD	(South Korea) Jun Jae-youn	(South Korea) Lee Yun-hwa
27 August	U.S. Open: Host: Los Angeles, United States; Level: Grand Prix; Prize: $50,000; Format: 64MS/32WS/32MD/32WD/32XD	Score: 21–18, 21–16	
27 August	U.S. Open: Host: Los Angeles, United States; Level: Grand Prix; Prize: $50,000; Format: 64MS/32WS/32MD/32WD/32XD	(Japan) Tadashi Ohtsuka (Japan) Keita Masuda	(United States) Howard Bach (United States) Khan Malaythong
27 August	U.S. Open: Host: Los Angeles, United States; Level: Grand Prix; Prize: $50,000; Format: 64MS/32WS/32MD/32WD/32XD	Score: 21–18, 21–11	
27 August	U.S. Open: Host: Los Angeles, United States; Level: Grand Prix; Prize: $50,000; Format: 64MS/32WS/32MD/32WD/32XD	(Japan) Miyuki Maeda (Japan) Satoko Suetsuna	(Japan) Aki Akao (Japan) Tomomi Matsuda
27 August	U.S. Open: Host: Los Angeles, United States; Level: Grand Prix; Prize: $50,000; Format: 64MS/32WS/32MD/32WD/32XD	Score: 16–21, 21–14, 21–15	
27 August	U.S. Open: Host: Los Angeles, United States; Level: Grand Prix; Prize: $50,000; Format: 64MS/32WS/32MD/32WD/32XD	(Japan) Keita Masuda (Japan) Miyuki Maeda	(United States) Howard Bach (United States) Eva Lee
27 August	U.S. Open: Host: Los Angeles, United States; Level: Grand Prix; Prize: $50,000; Format: 64MS/32WS/32MD/32WD/32XD	Score: 19–21, 21–11, 21–19	
27 August	Turkey International: Host: Istanbul, Turkey; Level: International Challenge; Prize: $15,000; Format: 32MS/32WS/32MD/32WD/32XD	(Denmark) Hans-Kristian Vittinghus	(Czech Republic) Petr Koukal
27 August	Turkey International: Host: Istanbul, Turkey; Level: International Challenge; Prize: $15,000; Format: 32MS/32WS/32MD/32WD/32XD	Score: 23–21, 21–15	
27 August	Turkey International: Host: Istanbul, Turkey; Level: International Challenge; Prize: $15,000; Format: 32MS/32WS/32MD/32WD/32XD	(Germany) Juliane Schenk	(Bulgaria) Petya Nedelcheva
27 August	Turkey International: Host: Istanbul, Turkey; Level: International Challenge; Prize: $15,000; Format: 32MS/32WS/32MD/32WD/32XD	Score: 14–21, 21–12 Retired	
27 August	Turkey International: Host: Istanbul, Turkey; Level: International Challenge; Prize: $15,000; Format: 32MS/32WS/32MD/32WD/32XD	(Germany) Kristof Hopp (Germany) Ingo Kindervater	(Germany) Johannes Schöttler (Germany) Tim Dettmann
27 August	Turkey International: Host: Istanbul, Turkey; Level: International Challenge; Prize: $15,000; Format: 32MS/32WS/32MD/32WD/32XD	Score: 12–21, 21–18, 22–20	
27 August	Turkey International: Host: Istanbul, Turkey; Level: International Challenge; Prize: $15,000; Format: 32MS/32WS/32MD/32WD/32XD	(Germany) Juliane Schenk (Germany) Nicole Grether	(Bulgaria) Diana Dimova (Bulgaria) Petya Nedelcheva
27 August	Turkey International: Host: Istanbul, Turkey; Level: International Challenge; Prize: $15,000; Format: 32MS/32WS/32MD/32WD/32XD	Score: Walkover	
27 August	Turkey International: Host: Istanbul, Turkey; Level: International Challenge; Prize: $15,000; Format: 32MS/32WS/32MD/32WD/32XD	(Germany) Ingo Kindervater (Germany) Kathrin Piotrowski	(Germany) Kristof Hopp (Germany) Birgit Overzier
27 August	Turkey International: Host: Istanbul, Turkey; Level: International Challenge; Prize: $15,000; Format: 32MS/32WS/32MD/32WD/32XD	Score: 21–18, 21–15	

=== September ===
Week of	Tournament	Champions	Runners-up
3 September	South Pacific Games: Host: Apia, Samoa; Level: Multi-sport event; Format: 4XT(RR))/32MS/16WS/16MD/8WD/16XD	New Caledonia	Fiji
3 September	South Pacific Games: Host: Apia, Samoa; Level: Multi-sport event; Format: 4XT(RR))/32MS/16WS/16MD/8WD/16XD	Score: Round robin	
3 September	South Pacific Games: Host: Apia, Samoa; Level: Multi-sport event; Format: 4XT(RR))/32MS/16WS/16MD/8WD/16XD	Marc Antoine Desaymoz	Arnaud Franzi
3 September	South Pacific Games: Host: Apia, Samoa; Level: Multi-sport event; Format: 4XT(RR))/32MS/16WS/16MD/8WD/16XD	Score: 21–15, 21–11	
3 September	South Pacific Games: Host: Apia, Samoa; Level: Multi-sport event; Format: 4XT(RR))/32MS/16WS/16MD/8WD/16XD	(Fiji) Andra Whiteside	Johanna Kou
3 September	South Pacific Games: Host: Apia, Samoa; Level: Multi-sport event; Format: 4XT(RR))/32MS/16WS/16MD/8WD/16XD	Score: 16–21, 21–17, 21–17	
3 September	South Pacific Games: Host: Apia, Samoa; Level: Multi-sport event; Format: 4XT(RR))/32MS/16WS/16MD/8WD/16XD	Marc Antoine Desaymoz; Florent Mathey	Fabien Kaddour; Arnaud Franzi
3 September	South Pacific Games: Host: Apia, Samoa; Level: Multi-sport event; Format: 4XT(RR))/32MS/16WS/16MD/8WD/16XD	Score: 21–14, 21–16	
3 September	South Pacific Games: Host: Apia, Samoa; Level: Multi-sport event; Format: 4XT(RR))/32MS/16WS/16MD/8WD/16XD	Johanna Kou; Cecile Sarengat	(Fiji) Danielle Whiteside (Fiji) Andra Whiteside
3 September	South Pacific Games: Host: Apia, Samoa; Level: Multi-sport event; Format: 4XT(RR))/32MS/16WS/16MD/8WD/16XD	Score: 18–21, 21–12, 21–8	
3 September	South Pacific Games: Host: Apia, Samoa; Level: Multi-sport event; Format: 4XT(RR))/32MS/16WS/16MD/8WD/16XD	Marc Antoine Desaymoz; Johanna Kou	(Fiji) Ryan Fong (Fiji) Danielle Whiteside
3 September	South Pacific Games: Host: Apia, Samoa; Level: Multi-sport event; Format: 4XT(RR))/32MS/16WS/16MD/8WD/16XD	Score: Walkover	
3 September	Canadian International: Host: Saskatoon, Canada; Level: International Challenge; Prize: $15,000; Format: 32MS/32WS/32MD/16WD/16XD	(Malaysia) Lee Tsuen Seng	(Japan) Jun Takemura
3 September	Canadian International: Host: Saskatoon, Canada; Level: International Challenge; Prize: $15,000; Format: 32MS/32WS/32MD/16WD/16XD	Score: 21–13, 21–18	
3 September	Canadian International: Host: Saskatoon, Canada; Level: International Challenge; Prize: $15,000; Format: 32MS/32WS/32MD/16WD/16XD	(South Korea) Lee Yun-hwa	(South Korea) Jun Jae-youn
3 September	Canadian International: Host: Saskatoon, Canada; Level: International Challenge; Prize: $15,000; Format: 32MS/32WS/32MD/16WD/16XD	Score: 23–21, 16–21, 21–14	
3 September	Canadian International: Host: Saskatoon, Canada; Level: International Challenge; Prize: $15,000; Format: 32MS/32WS/32MD/16WD/16XD	(Canada) William Milroy (Canada) Mike Beres	(Germany) Jochen Cassel (Germany) Thomas Tesche
3 September	Canadian International: Host: Saskatoon, Canada; Level: International Challenge; Prize: $15,000; Format: 32MS/32WS/32MD/16WD/16XD	Score: 21–17, 21–14	
3 September	Canadian International: Host: Saskatoon, Canada; Level: International Challenge; Prize: $15,000; Format: 32MS/32WS/32MD/16WD/16XD	(South Korea) Hwang Yu-mi (South Korea) Ha Jung-eun	(South Korea) Joo Hyun-hee (South Korea) Oh Seul-ki
3 September	Canadian International: Host: Saskatoon, Canada; Level: International Challenge; Prize: $15,000; Format: 32MS/32WS/32MD/16WD/16XD	Score: 21–16, 21–7	
3 September	Canadian International: Host: Saskatoon, Canada; Level: International Challenge; Prize: $15,000; Format: 32MS/32WS/32MD/16WD/16XD	(Canada) William Milroy (Canada) Tammy Sun	(Canada) Mike Beres (Canada) Valerie Loker
3 September	Canadian International: Host: Saskatoon, Canada; Level: International Challenge; Prize: $15,000; Format: 32MS/32WS/32MD/16WD/16XD	Score: 21–15, 23–21	
3 September	Ballarat International: Host: Ballarat, Australia; Level: International Series; Prize: $5,000; Format: 64MS/32WS/32MD/16WD/32XD	(Spain) Pablo Abián	(Spain) Carlos Longo
3 September	Ballarat International: Host: Ballarat, Australia; Level: International Series; Prize: $5,000; Format: 64MS/32WS/32MD/16WD/32XD	Score: 21–18, 21–12	
3 September	Ballarat International: Host: Ballarat, Australia; Level: International Series; Prize: $5,000; Format: 64MS/32WS/32MD/16WD/32XD	(Singapore) Fu Mingtian	(Australia) Huang Chia-Chi
3 September	Ballarat International: Host: Ballarat, Australia; Level: International Series; Prize: $5,000; Format: 64MS/32WS/32MD/16WD/32XD	Score: 8–21, 21–13, 21–15	
3 September	Ballarat International: Host: Ballarat, Australia; Level: International Series; Prize: $5,000; Format: 64MS/32WS/32MD/16WD/32XD	(Australia) Ashley Brehaut (Australia) Aji Basuki Sindoro	(Singapore) Chayut Triyachart (Singapore) Riky Widianto
3 September	Ballarat International: Host: Ballarat, Australia; Level: International Series; Prize: $5,000; Format: 64MS/32WS/32MD/16WD/32XD	Score: 21–16, 21–15	
3 September	Ballarat International: Host: Ballarat, Australia; Level: International Series; Prize: $5,000; Format: 64MS/32WS/32MD/16WD/32XD	(Singapore) Shinta Mulia Sari (Singapore) Vanessa Neo Yu Yan	(Singapore) Yao Lei (Singapore) Liu Fan Frances
3 September	Ballarat International: Host: Ballarat, Australia; Level: International Series; Prize: $5,000; Format: 64MS/32WS/32MD/16WD/32XD	Score: 14–21, 21–17, 21–15	
3 September	Ballarat International: Host: Ballarat, Australia; Level: International Series; Prize: $5,000; Format: 64MS/32WS/32MD/16WD/32XD	(Singapore) Riky Widianto (Singapore) Vanessa Neo Yu Yan	(Singapore) Chayut Triyachart (Singapore) Shinta Mulia Sari
3 September	Ballarat International: Host: Ballarat, Australia; Level: International Series; Prize: $5,000; Format: 64MS/32WS/32MD/16WD/32XD	Score: 21–19, 21–16	
3 September	Belgian International: Host: Mechelen, Belgium; Level: International Challenge; Prize: $15,000; Format: 32MS/32WS/32MD/32WD/32XD	(Germany) Marc Zwiebler	(China) Wu Yunyong
3 September	Belgian International: Host: Mechelen, Belgium; Level: International Challenge; Prize: $15,000; Format: 32MS/32WS/32MD/32WD/32XD	Score: 21–16, 14–21, 21–19	
3 September	Belgian International: Host: Mechelen, Belgium; Level: International Challenge; Prize: $15,000; Format: 32MS/32WS/32MD/32WD/32XD	(Ukraine) Larissa Griga	(England) Elizabeth Cann
3 September	Belgian International: Host: Mechelen, Belgium; Level: International Challenge; Prize: $15,000; Format: 32MS/32WS/32MD/32WD/32XD	Score: 21–15, 16–21, 21–18	
3 September	Belgian International: Host: Mechelen, Belgium; Level: International Challenge; Prize: $15,000; Format: 32MS/32WS/32MD/32WD/32XD	(Germany) Kristof Hopp (Germany) Ingo Kindervater	(Germany) Michael Fuchs (Germany) Roman Spitko
3 September	Belgian International: Host: Mechelen, Belgium; Level: International Challenge; Prize: $15,000; Format: 32MS/32WS/32MD/32WD/32XD	Score: 25–27, 21–15, 21–7 Retired	
3 September	Belgian International: Host: Mechelen, Belgium; Level: International Challenge; Prize: $15,000; Format: 32MS/32WS/32MD/32WD/32XD	(England) Nathalie Munt (England) Joanne Nicholas	(England) Sarah Bok (England) Jenny Wallwork
3 September	Belgian International: Host: Mechelen, Belgium; Level: International Challenge; Prize: $15,000; Format: 32MS/32WS/32MD/32WD/32XD	Score: 21–17, 21–14	
3 September	Belgian International: Host: Mechelen, Belgium; Level: International Challenge; Prize: $15,000; Format: 32MS/32WS/32MD/32WD/32XD	(England) Chris Langridge (England) Joanne Nicholas	(Germany) Ingo Kindervater (Germany) Kathrin Piotrowski
3 September	Belgian International: Host: Mechelen, Belgium; Level: International Challenge; Prize: $15,000; Format: 32MS/32WS/32MD/32WD/32XD	Score: 21–17, 15–21, 25–23	
10 September	Japan Open (Draw): Host: Tokyo, Japan; Level: Superseries; Prize: $200,000; Format: 32MS/32WS/32MD/32WD/32XD	(Malaysia) Lee Chong Wei	(Indonesia) Taufik Hidayat
10 September	Japan Open (Draw): Host: Tokyo, Japan; Level: Superseries; Prize: $200,000; Format: 32MS/32WS/32MD/32WD/32XD	Score: 22–20, 19–21, 21–19	
10 September	Japan Open (Draw): Host: Tokyo, Japan; Level: Superseries; Prize: $200,000; Format: 32MS/32WS/32MD/32WD/32XD	(Denmark) Tine Rasmussen	(China) Xie Xingfang
10 September	Japan Open (Draw): Host: Tokyo, Japan; Level: Superseries; Prize: $200,000; Format: 32MS/32WS/32MD/32WD/32XD	Score: 21–15, 21–17	
10 September	Japan Open (Draw): Host: Tokyo, Japan; Level: Superseries; Prize: $200,000; Format: 32MS/32WS/32MD/32WD/32XD	(United States) Tony Gunawan (Indonesia) Candra Wijaya	(Indonesia) Luluk Hadiyanto (Indonesia) Alvent Yulianto Chandra
10 September	Japan Open (Draw): Host: Tokyo, Japan; Level: Superseries; Prize: $200,000; Format: 32MS/32WS/32MD/32WD/32XD	Score: 21–18, 21–17	
10 September	Japan Open (Draw): Host: Tokyo, Japan; Level: Superseries; Prize: $200,000; Format: 32MS/32WS/32MD/32WD/32XD	(China) Yang Wei (China) Zhang Jiewen	(China) Zhao Tingting (China) Yu Yang
10 September	Japan Open (Draw): Host: Tokyo, Japan; Level: Superseries; Prize: $200,000; Format: 32MS/32WS/32MD/32WD/32XD	Score: 21–17, 21–5	
10 September	Japan Open (Draw): Host: Tokyo, Japan; Level: Superseries; Prize: $200,000; Format: 32MS/32WS/32MD/32WD/32XD	(China) Zheng Bo (China) Gao Ling	(Indonesia) Nova Widianto (Indonesia) Liliyana Natsir
10 September	Japan Open (Draw): Host: Tokyo, Japan; Level: Superseries; Prize: $200,000; Format: 32MS/32WS/32MD/32WD/32XD	Score: 21–19, 21–14	
10 September	Waikato International: Host: Hamilton, New Zealand; Level: International Series; Prize: $5,000; Format: 64MS/32WS/32MD/16WD/32XD	(Singapore) Ashton Chen Yong Zhao	(Spain) Pablo Abián
10 September	Waikato International: Host: Hamilton, New Zealand; Level: International Series; Prize: $5,000; Format: 64MS/32WS/32MD/16WD/32XD	Score: 21–17, 21–17	
10 September	Waikato International: Host: Hamilton, New Zealand; Level: International Series; Prize: $5,000; Format: 64MS/32WS/32MD/16WD/32XD	(Singapore) Fu Mingtian	(Singapore) Gu Juan
10 September	Waikato International: Host: Hamilton, New Zealand; Level: International Series; Prize: $5,000; Format: 64MS/32WS/32MD/16WD/32XD	Score: 21–14, 21–17	
10 September	Waikato International: Host: Hamilton, New Zealand; Level: International Series; Prize: $5,000; Format: 64MS/32WS/32MD/16WD/32XD	(Indonesia) Wifqi Windarto (Indonesia) Afiat Yuris Wirawan	(Singapore) Khoo Kian Teck (Singapore) Ashton Chen Yong Zhao
10 September	Waikato International: Host: Hamilton, New Zealand; Level: International Series; Prize: $5,000; Format: 64MS/32WS/32MD/16WD/32XD	Score: 21–14, 21–15	
10 September	Waikato International: Host: Hamilton, New Zealand; Level: International Series; Prize: $5,000; Format: 64MS/32WS/32MD/16WD/32XD	(Singapore) Yao Lei (Singapore) Liu Fan Frances	(Singapore) Shinta Mulia Sari (Singapore) Vanessa Neo Yu Yan
10 September	Waikato International: Host: Hamilton, New Zealand; Level: International Series; Prize: $5,000; Format: 64MS/32WS/32MD/16WD/32XD	Score: 21–11, 18–21, 21–17	
10 September	Waikato International: Host: Hamilton, New Zealand; Level: International Series; Prize: $5,000; Format: 64MS/32WS/32MD/16WD/32XD	(Singapore) Chayut Triyachart (Singapore) Shinta Mulia Sari	(Singapore) Riky Widianto (Singapore) Vanessa Neo Yu Yan
10 September	Waikato International: Host: Hamilton, New Zealand; Level: International Series; Prize: $5,000; Format: 64MS/32WS/32MD/16WD/32XD	Score: 21–16, 21–19	
17 September	Chinese Taipei Open: Host: New Taipei City, Chinese Taipei; Level: Grand Prix Gold; Prize: $120,000; Format: 64MS/32WS/32MD/32WD/32XD	(Indonesia) Sony Dwi Kuncoro	(Indonesia) Taufik Hidayat
17 September	Chinese Taipei Open: Host: New Taipei City, Chinese Taipei; Level: Grand Prix Gold; Prize: $120,000; Format: 64MS/32WS/32MD/32WD/32XD	Score: 18–21, 21–6, 21–13	
17 September	Chinese Taipei Open: Host: New Taipei City, Chinese Taipei; Level: Grand Prix Gold; Prize: $120,000; Format: 64MS/32WS/32MD/32WD/32XD	(Hong Kong) Wang Chen	(France) Pi Hongyan
17 September	Chinese Taipei Open: Host: New Taipei City, Chinese Taipei; Level: Grand Prix Gold; Prize: $120,000; Format: 64MS/32WS/32MD/32WD/32XD	Score: 21–18, 14–21, 26–24	
17 September	Chinese Taipei Open: Host: New Taipei City, Chinese Taipei; Level: Grand Prix Gold; Prize: $120,000; Format: 64MS/32WS/32MD/32WD/32XD	(Indonesia) Markis Kido (Indonesia) Hendra Setiawan	(Denmark) Lars Paaske (Denmark) Jonas Rasmussen
17 September	Chinese Taipei Open: Host: New Taipei City, Chinese Taipei; Level: Grand Prix Gold; Prize: $120,000; Format: 64MS/32WS/32MD/32WD/32XD	Score: 21–17, 21–12	
17 September	Chinese Taipei Open: Host: New Taipei City, Chinese Taipei; Level: Grand Prix Gold; Prize: $120,000; Format: 64MS/32WS/32MD/32WD/32XD	(Chinese Taipei) Cheng Wen-hsing (Chinese Taipei) Chien Yu-chin	(Indonesia) Liliyana Natsir (Indonesia) Vita Marissa
17 September	Chinese Taipei Open: Host: New Taipei City, Chinese Taipei; Level: Grand Prix Gold; Prize: $120,000; Format: 64MS/32WS/32MD/32WD/32XD	Score: 21–15, 17–21, 21–18	
17 September	Chinese Taipei Open: Host: New Taipei City, Chinese Taipei; Level: Grand Prix Gold; Prize: $120,000; Format: 64MS/32WS/32MD/32WD/32XD	(Indonesia) Flandy Limpele (Indonesia) Vita Marissa	(Denmark) Thomas Laybourn (Denmark) Kamilla Rytter Juhl
17 September	Chinese Taipei Open: Host: New Taipei City, Chinese Taipei; Level: Grand Prix Gold; Prize: $120,000; Format: 64MS/32WS/32MD/32WD/32XD	Score: 21–18, 25–23	
17 September	Czech International: Host: Brno, Czech Republic; Level: International Series; Prize: $5,000; Format: 32MS/32WS/32MD/32WD/32XD	(India) Arvind Bhat	(Austria) Jürgen Koch
17 September	Czech International: Host: Brno, Czech Republic; Level: International Series; Prize: $5,000; Format: 32MS/32WS/32MD/32WD/32XD	Score: 21–18, 21–13	
17 September	Czech International: Host: Brno, Czech Republic; Level: International Series; Prize: $5,000; Format: 32MS/32WS/32MD/32WD/32XD	(Netherlands) Rachel van Cutsen	(England) Elizabeth Cann
17 September	Czech International: Host: Brno, Czech Republic; Level: International Series; Prize: $5,000; Format: 32MS/32WS/32MD/32WD/32XD	Score: 21–10, 22–20	
17 September	Czech International: Host: Brno, Czech Republic; Level: International Series; Prize: $5,000; Format: 32MS/32WS/32MD/32WD/32XD	(Denmark) Kasper Faust Henriksen (Denmark) Rasmus Bonde	(Belgium) Frédéric Mawet (Belgium) Wouter Claes
17 September	Czech International: Host: Brno, Czech Republic; Level: International Series; Prize: $5,000; Format: 32MS/32WS/32MD/32WD/32XD	Score: 21–17, 18–21, 21–18	
17 September	Czech International: Host: Brno, Czech Republic; Level: International Series; Prize: $5,000; Format: 32MS/32WS/32MD/32WD/32XD	(Denmark) Mie Schjøtt-Kristensen (Denmark) Christinna Pedersen	(Russia) Elena Shimko (Russia) Tatjana Bibik
17 September	Czech International: Host: Brno, Czech Republic; Level: International Series; Prize: $5,000; Format: 32MS/32WS/32MD/32WD/32XD	Score: 21–11, 22–20	
17 September	Czech International: Host: Brno, Czech Republic; Level: International Series; Prize: $5,000; Format: 32MS/32WS/32MD/32WD/32XD	(Denmark) Rasmus Bonde (Denmark) Christinna Pedersen	(Russia) Anton Nazarenko (Russia) Elena Chernyavskaya
17 September	Czech International: Host: Brno, Czech Republic; Level: International Series; Prize: $5,000; Format: 32MS/32WS/32MD/32WD/32XD	Score: 21–19, 21–12	
24 September	Slovak International: Host: Prešov, Slovakia; Level: Future Series; Format: 32MS/32WS/32MD/16WD/32XD	(Ukraine) Dmytro Zavadsky	(Denmark) Sune Gavnholt
24 September	Slovak International: Host: Prešov, Slovakia; Level: Future Series; Format: 32MS/32WS/32MD/16WD/32XD	Score: 21–14, 21–19	
24 September	Slovak International: Host: Prešov, Slovakia; Level: Future Series; Format: 32MS/32WS/32MD/16WD/32XD	(Denmark) Anne Hald Jensen	(Ukraine) Mariya Martynenko
24 September	Slovak International: Host: Prešov, Slovakia; Level: Future Series; Format: 32MS/32WS/32MD/16WD/32XD	Score: 21–12, 21–18	
24 September	Slovak International: Host: Prešov, Slovakia; Level: Future Series; Format: 32MS/32WS/32MD/16WD/32XD	(Croatia) Zvonimir Durkinjak (Czech Republic) Jakub Bitman	(Russia) Ivan Sozonov (Russia) Anton Ivanov
24 September	Slovak International: Host: Prešov, Slovakia; Level: Future Series; Format: 32MS/32WS/32MD/16WD/32XD	Score: Walkover	
24 September	Slovak International: Host: Prešov, Slovakia; Level: Future Series; Format: 32MS/32WS/32MD/16WD/32XD	(Russia) Elena Shimko (Russia) Tatjana Bibik	(Russia) Elena Chernyavskaya (Russia) Anastasia Prokopenko
24 September	Slovak International: Host: Prešov, Slovakia; Level: Future Series; Format: 32MS/32WS/32MD/16WD/32XD	Score: Walkover	
24 September	Slovak International: Host: Prešov, Slovakia; Level: Future Series; Format: 32MS/32WS/32MD/16WD/32XD	(Russia) Anton Nazarenko (Russia) Elena Chernyavskaya	(Russia) Andrey Ashmarin (Russia) Elena Shimko
24 September	Slovak International: Host: Prešov, Slovakia; Level: Future Series; Format: 32MS/32WS/32MD/16WD/32XD	Score: 21–11, 21–19	

=== October ===
Week of	Tournament	Champions	Runners-up
1 October	Macau Open: Host: Macau; Level: Grand Prix Gold; Prize: $120,000; Format: 64MS/32WS/32MD/32WD/32XD	(China) Chen Jin	(Indonesia) Taufik Hidayat
1 October	Macau Open: Host: Macau; Level: Grand Prix Gold; Prize: $120,000; Format: 64MS/32WS/32MD/32WD/32XD	Score: 19–21, 21–17, 21–18	
1 October	Macau Open: Host: Macau; Level: Grand Prix Gold; Prize: $120,000; Format: 64MS/32WS/32MD/32WD/32XD	(China) Xie Xingfang	(South Korea) Jun Jae-youn
1 October	Macau Open: Host: Macau; Level: Grand Prix Gold; Prize: $120,000; Format: 64MS/32WS/32MD/32WD/32XD	Score: 21–10, 21–10	
1 October	Macau Open: Host: Macau; Level: Grand Prix Gold; Prize: $120,000; Format: 64MS/32WS/32MD/32WD/32XD	(Malaysia) Koo Kien Keat (Malaysia) Tan Boon Heong	(Malaysia) Choong Tan Fook (Malaysia) Lee Wan Wah
1 October	Macau Open: Host: Macau; Level: Grand Prix Gold; Prize: $120,000; Format: 64MS/32WS/32MD/32WD/32XD	Score: 21–18, 17–21, 23–21	
1 October	Macau Open: Host: Macau; Level: Grand Prix Gold; Prize: $120,000; Format: 64MS/32WS/32MD/32WD/32XD	(China) Gao Ling (China) Huang Sui	(South Korea) Lee Hyo-jung (South Korea) Lee Kyung-won
1 October	Macau Open: Host: Macau; Level: Grand Prix Gold; Prize: $120,000; Format: 64MS/32WS/32MD/32WD/32XD	Score: 21–15, 21–7	
1 October	Macau Open: Host: Macau; Level: Grand Prix Gold; Prize: $120,000; Format: 64MS/32WS/32MD/32WD/32XD	(China) Xie Zhongbo (China) Zhang Yawen	(Chinese Taipei) Fang Chieh-min (Chinese Taipei) Cheng Wen-hsing
1 October	Macau Open: Host: Macau; Level: Grand Prix Gold; Prize: $120,000; Format: 64MS/32WS/32MD/32WD/32XD	Score: 21–14, 21–16	
1 October	Bitburger Open: Host: Saarlandhalle, Saarbrücken, Germany; Level: Grand Prix; Prize: $70,000; Format: 64MS/32WS/32MD/32WD/32XD	(China) Lu Yi	(Malaysia) Lee Tsuen Seng
1 October	Bitburger Open: Host: Saarlandhalle, Saarbrücken, Germany; Level: Grand Prix; Prize: $70,000; Format: 64MS/32WS/32MD/32WD/32XD	Score: 23–21, 19–21, 21–15	
1 October	Bitburger Open: Host: Saarlandhalle, Saarbrücken, Germany; Level: Grand Prix; Prize: $70,000; Format: 64MS/32WS/32MD/32WD/32XD	(China) Wang Yihan	(Germany) Juliane Schenk
1 October	Bitburger Open: Host: Saarlandhalle, Saarbrücken, Germany; Level: Grand Prix; Prize: $70,000; Format: 64MS/32WS/32MD/32WD/32XD	Score: 16–21, 21–10, 21–17	
1 October	Bitburger Open: Host: Saarlandhalle, Saarbrücken, Germany; Level: Grand Prix; Prize: $70,000; Format: 64MS/32WS/32MD/32WD/32XD	(Denmark) Mathias Boe (Denmark) Carsten Mogensen	(England) Robert Blair (England) David Lindley
1 October	Bitburger Open: Host: Saarlandhalle, Saarbrücken, Germany; Level: Grand Prix; Prize: $70,000; Format: 64MS/32WS/32MD/32WD/32XD	Score: 21–17, 21–15	
1 October	Bitburger Open: Host: Saarlandhalle, Saarbrücken, Germany; Level: Grand Prix; Prize: $70,000; Format: 64MS/32WS/32MD/32WD/32XD	(China) Yang Wei (China) Zhang Jiewen	(England) Natalie Munt (England) Joanne Nicholas
1 October	Bitburger Open: Host: Saarlandhalle, Saarbrücken, Germany; Level: Grand Prix; Prize: $70,000; Format: 64MS/32WS/32MD/32WD/32XD	Score: 21–11, 21–10	
1 October	Bitburger Open: Host: Saarlandhalle, Saarbrücken, Germany; Level: Grand Prix; Prize: $70,000; Format: 64MS/32WS/32MD/32WD/32XD	(Germany) Kristof Hopp (Germany) Birgit Overzier	(England) Robert Blair (Scotland) Imogen Bankier
1 October	Bitburger Open: Host: Saarlandhalle, Saarbrücken, Germany; Level: Grand Prix; Prize: $70,000; Format: 64MS/32WS/32MD/32WD/32XD	Score: 21–17, 21–17	
1 October	Bulgarian International: Host: Sofia, Bulgaria; Level: International Challenge; Prize: $15,000; Format: 64MS/64WS/32MD/32WD/32XD	(Czech Republic) Jan Fröhlich	(Guatemala) Kevin Cordón
1 October	Bulgarian International: Host: Sofia, Bulgaria; Level: International Challenge; Prize: $15,000; Format: 64MS/64WS/32MD/32WD/32XD	Score: 21–13, 17–7 retired	
1 October	Bulgarian International: Host: Sofia, Bulgaria; Level: International Challenge; Prize: $15,000; Format: 64MS/64WS/32MD/32WD/32XD	(Bulgaria) Petya Nedelcheva	(Canada) Anna Rice
1 October	Bulgarian International: Host: Sofia, Bulgaria; Level: International Challenge; Prize: $15,000; Format: 64MS/64WS/32MD/32WD/32XD	Score: 21–19, 21–16	
1 October	Bulgarian International: Host: Sofia, Bulgaria; Level: International Challenge; Prize: $15,000; Format: 64MS/64WS/32MD/32WD/32XD	(Poland) Robert Mateusiak (Poland) Michał Łogosz	(France) Erwin Kehlhoffner (France) Svetoslav Stoyanov
1 October	Bulgarian International: Host: Sofia, Bulgaria; Level: International Challenge; Prize: $15,000; Format: 64MS/64WS/32MD/32WD/32XD	Score: Walkover	
1 October	Bulgarian International: Host: Sofia, Bulgaria; Level: International Challenge; Prize: $15,000; Format: 64MS/64WS/32MD/32WD/32XD	(Russia) Valeria Sorokina (Russia) Nina Vislova	(Malaysia) Lim Pek Siah (Malaysia) Haw Chiou Hwee
1 October	Bulgarian International: Host: Sofia, Bulgaria; Level: International Challenge; Prize: $15,000; Format: 64MS/64WS/32MD/32WD/32XD	Score: 16–21, 21–13, 21–5	
1 October	Bulgarian International: Host: Sofia, Bulgaria; Level: International Challenge; Prize: $15,000; Format: 64MS/64WS/32MD/32WD/32XD	(Russia) Aleksandr Nikolaenko (Russia) Nina Vislova	(France) Svetoslav Stoyanov (France) Élodie Eymard
1 October	Bulgarian International: Host: Sofia, Bulgaria; Level: International Challenge; Prize: $15,000; Format: 64MS/64WS/32MD/32WD/32XD	Score: 21–18, 19–21, 21–15	
1 October	Puerto Rico International: Host: San Juan, Puerto Rico; Level: Future Series; Format: 32MS/32WS/16MD/8WD/16XD	(Spain) José Antonio Crespo	(Peru) Andrés Corpancho
1 October	Puerto Rico International: Host: San Juan, Puerto Rico; Level: Future Series; Format: 32MS/32WS/16MD/8WD/16XD	Score: 16–21, 21–14, 21–16	
1 October	Puerto Rico International: Host: San Juan, Puerto Rico; Level: Future Series; Format: 32MS/32WS/16MD/8WD/16XD	(Spain) Lucia Tavera	(Peru) Jie Meng
1 October	Puerto Rico International: Host: San Juan, Puerto Rico; Level: Future Series; Format: 32MS/32WS/16MD/8WD/16XD	Score: 21–14, 20–22, 21–16	
1 October	Puerto Rico International: Host: San Juan, Puerto Rico; Level: Future Series; Format: 32MS/32WS/16MD/8WD/16XD	(Brazil) Guilherme Pardo (Brazil) Guilherme Kumasaka	(United States) Dean Schoppe (United States) Mathew Fogarty
1 October	Puerto Rico International: Host: San Juan, Puerto Rico; Level: Future Series; Format: 32MS/32WS/16MD/8WD/16XD	Score: 21–10, 21–15	
1 October	Puerto Rico International: Host: San Juan, Puerto Rico; Level: Future Series; Format: 32MS/32WS/16MD/8WD/16XD	(United States) Jennifer Coleman (United States) Lauren Todt	(Peru) Jie Meng (Peru) Valeria Rivero
1 October	Puerto Rico International: Host: San Juan, Puerto Rico; Level: Future Series; Format: 32MS/32WS/16MD/8WD/16XD	Score: 21–18, 13–21, 21–18	
1 October	Puerto Rico International: Host: San Juan, Puerto Rico; Level: Future Series; Format: 32MS/32WS/16MD/8WD/16XD	(Peru) Andrés Corpancho (Peru) Valeria Rivero	(Puerto Rico) Hector Rios (Puerto Rico) Irytsha González
1 October	Puerto Rico International: Host: San Juan, Puerto Rico; Level: Future Series; Format: 32MS/32WS/16MD/8WD/16XD	Score: 21–7, 21–3	
8 October	Brazil International: Host: São Paulo, Brazil; Level: Future Series; Format: 64MS/32WS/16MD/16WD/32XD	(United States) Eric Go	(Peru) Andrés Corpancho
8 October	Brazil International: Host: São Paulo, Brazil; Level: Future Series; Format: 64MS/32WS/16MD/16WD/32XD	Score: 17–21, 21–16, 21–19	
8 October	Brazil International: Host: São Paulo, Brazil; Level: Future Series; Format: 64MS/32WS/16MD/16WD/32XD	(Spain) Lucia Tavera	(Mexico) Deyanira Angulo
8 October	Brazil International: Host: São Paulo, Brazil; Level: Future Series; Format: 64MS/32WS/16MD/16WD/32XD	Score: 21–9, 21–18	
8 October	Brazil International: Host: São Paulo, Brazil; Level: Future Series; Format: 64MS/32WS/16MD/16WD/32XD	(Brazil) Lucas Araújo (Brazil) Paulo von Scala	(Brazil) Guilherme Pardo (Brazil) Guilherme Kumasaka
8 October	Brazil International: Host: São Paulo, Brazil; Level: Future Series; Format: 64MS/32WS/16MD/16WD/32XD	Score: 17–21, 21–18, 21–14	
8 October	Brazil International: Host: São Paulo, Brazil; Level: Future Series; Format: 64MS/32WS/16MD/16WD/32XD	(Peru) Jie Meng (Peru) Valeria Rivero	(Brazil) Marina Eliezer (Brazil) Paula Villela
8 October	Brazil International: Host: São Paulo, Brazil; Level: Future Series; Format: 64MS/32WS/16MD/16WD/32XD	Score: 21–8, 21–14	
8 October	Brazil International: Host: São Paulo, Brazil; Level: Future Series; Format: 64MS/32WS/16MD/16WD/32XD	(Peru) Andrés Corpancho (Peru) Valeria Rivero	(Brazil) Filipe Toledo (Brazil) Paula Pereira
8 October	Brazil International: Host: São Paulo, Brazil; Level: Future Series; Format: 64MS/32WS/16MD/16WD/32XD	Score: 21–7, 21–13	
8 October	Cyprus International: Host: Nicosia, Cyprus; Level: International Series; Prize: $5,000; Format: 32MS/32WS/32MD/16WD/16XD	(India) Chetan Anand	(Guatemala) Kevin Cordón
8 October	Cyprus International: Host: Nicosia, Cyprus; Level: International Series; Prize: $5,000; Format: 32MS/32WS/32MD/16WD/16XD	Score: 21–8, 26–24	
8 October	Cyprus International: Host: Nicosia, Cyprus; Level: International Series; Prize: $5,000; Format: 32MS/32WS/32MD/16WD/16XD	(Estonia) Kati Tolmoff	(Denmark) Karina Jørgensen
8 October	Cyprus International: Host: Nicosia, Cyprus; Level: International Series; Prize: $5,000; Format: 32MS/32WS/32MD/16WD/16XD	Score: 21–14, 21–19	
8 October	Cyprus International: Host: Nicosia, Cyprus; Level: International Series; Prize: $5,000; Format: 32MS/32WS/32MD/16WD/16XD	(Denmark) Christian Larsen (Denmark) Christian John Skovgaard	(Denmark) Morten T. Kronborg (Denmark) Christopher Bruun Jensen
8 October	Cyprus International: Host: Nicosia, Cyprus; Level: International Series; Prize: $5,000; Format: 32MS/32WS/32MD/16WD/16XD	Score: 22–20, 24–22	
8 October	Cyprus International: Host: Nicosia, Cyprus; Level: International Series; Prize: $5,000; Format: 32MS/32WS/32MD/16WD/16XD	(India) Jwala Gutta (India) Shruti Kurian	(Estonia) Kati Tolmoff (Iceland) Ragna Ingólfsdóttir
8 October	Cyprus International: Host: Nicosia, Cyprus; Level: International Series; Prize: $5,000; Format: 32MS/32WS/32MD/16WD/16XD	Score: 21–12, 21–13	
8 October	Cyprus International: Host: Nicosia, Cyprus; Level: International Series; Prize: $5,000; Format: 32MS/32WS/32MD/16WD/16XD	(India) Chetan Anand (India) Jwala Gutta	(Denmark) Christian John Skovgaard (Denmark) Maria Kaaberbol Thorberg
8 October	Cyprus International: Host: Nicosia, Cyprus; Level: International Series; Prize: $5,000; Format: 32MS/32WS/32MD/16WD/16XD	Score: 21–14, 22–20	
15 October	Dutch Open: Host: Almere, Netherlands; Level: Grand Prix; Prize: $50,000; Format: 64MS/32WS/32MD/32WD/32XD	(Singapore) Lee Yen Hui Kendrick	(Poland) Przemysław Wacha
15 October	Dutch Open: Host: Almere, Netherlands; Level: Grand Prix; Prize: $50,000; Format: 64MS/32WS/32MD/32WD/32XD	Score: 20–22, 21–11, 21–18	
15 October	Dutch Open: Host: Almere, Netherlands; Level: Grand Prix; Prize: $50,000; Format: 64MS/32WS/32MD/32WD/32XD	(China) Li Wenyan	(Netherlands) Judith Meulendijks
15 October	Dutch Open: Host: Almere, Netherlands; Level: Grand Prix; Prize: $50,000; Format: 64MS/32WS/32MD/32WD/32XD	Score: 21–18, 21–19	
15 October	Dutch Open: Host: Almere, Netherlands; Level: Grand Prix; Prize: $50,000; Format: 64MS/32WS/32MD/32WD/32XD	(Indonesia) Yonathan Suryatama Dasuki (Indonesia) Rian Sukmawan	(Indonesia) Fran Kurniawan (Indonesia) Rendra Wijaya
15 October	Dutch Open: Host: Almere, Netherlands; Level: Grand Prix; Prize: $50,000; Format: 64MS/32WS/32MD/32WD/32XD	Score: 21–13, 21–12	
15 October	Dutch Open: Host: Almere, Netherlands; Level: Grand Prix; Prize: $50,000; Format: 64MS/32WS/32MD/32WD/32XD	(Russia) Ekaterina Ananina (Russia) Anastasia Russkikh	(Russia) Valeri Sorokina (Russia) Nina Vislova
15 October	Dutch Open: Host: Almere, Netherlands; Level: Grand Prix; Prize: $50,000; Format: 64MS/32WS/32MD/32WD/32XD	Score: 20–22, 21–15, 21–13	
15 October	Dutch Open: Host: Almere, Netherlands; Level: Grand Prix; Prize: $50,000; Format: 64MS/32WS/32MD/32WD/32XD	(Denmark) Rasmus Bonde (Denmark) Christinna Pedersen	(Singapore) Hendri Saputra (Singapore) Li Yujia
15 October	Dutch Open: Host: Almere, Netherlands; Level: Grand Prix; Prize: $50,000; Format: 64MS/32WS/32MD/32WD/32XD	Score: 21–16, 21–14	
22 October	Denmark Open (Draw): Host: Odense, Denmark; Level: Superseries; Prize: $200,000; Format: 32MS/32WS/32MD/32WD/32XD	(China) Lin Dan	(China) Bao Chunlai
22 October	Denmark Open (Draw): Host: Odense, Denmark; Level: Superseries; Prize: $200,000; Format: 32MS/32WS/32MD/32WD/32XD	Score: 21–15, 21–12	
22 October	Denmark Open (Draw): Host: Odense, Denmark; Level: Superseries; Prize: $200,000; Format: 32MS/32WS/32MD/32WD/32XD	(China) Lu Lan	(China) Zhang Ning
22 October	Denmark Open (Draw): Host: Odense, Denmark; Level: Superseries; Prize: $200,000; Format: 32MS/32WS/32MD/32WD/32XD	Score: 21–17, 21–14	
22 October	Denmark Open (Draw): Host: Odense, Denmark; Level: Superseries; Prize: $200,000; Format: 32MS/32WS/32MD/32WD/32XD	(Malaysia) Koo Kien Keat (Malaysia) Tan Boon Heong	(Denmark) Jens Eriksen (Denmark) Martin Lundgaard Hansen
22 October	Denmark Open (Draw): Host: Odense, Denmark; Level: Superseries; Prize: $200,000; Format: 32MS/32WS/32MD/32WD/32XD	Score: 14–21, 21–14, 21–12	
22 October	Denmark Open (Draw): Host: Odense, Denmark; Level: Superseries; Prize: $200,000; Format: 32MS/32WS/32MD/32WD/32XD	(China) Yang Wei (China) Zhang Jiewen	(South Korea) Lee Hyo-jung (South Korea) Lee Kyung-won
22 October	Denmark Open (Draw): Host: Odense, Denmark; Level: Superseries; Prize: $200,000; Format: 32MS/32WS/32MD/32WD/32XD	Score: 12–21, 21–19, 21–19	
22 October	Denmark Open (Draw): Host: Odense, Denmark; Level: Superseries; Prize: $200,000; Format: 32MS/32WS/32MD/32WD/32XD	(China) He Hanbin (China) Yu Yang	(England) Nathan Robertson (England) Gail Emms
22 October	Denmark Open (Draw): Host: Odense, Denmark; Level: Superseries; Prize: $200,000; Format: 32MS/32WS/32MD/32WD/32XD	Score: 21–17, 19–21, 21–17	
29 October	BWF World Junior Championships (Draw): Host: Waitakere City, New Zealand; Level: Suhandinata & Bimantara Cup; Format: 27XT/128MS/128WS/64MD/64WD/128XD	China	South Korea
29 October	BWF World Junior Championships (Draw): Host: Waitakere City, New Zealand; Level: Suhandinata & Bimantara Cup; Format: 27XT/128MS/128WS/64MD/64WD/128XD	Score: 3–1	
29 October	BWF World Junior Championships (Draw): Host: Waitakere City, New Zealand; Level: Suhandinata & Bimantara Cup; Format: 27XT/128MS/128WS/64MD/64WD/128XD	(China) Chen Long	(Japan) Kenichi Tago
29 October	BWF World Junior Championships (Draw): Host: Waitakere City, New Zealand; Level: Suhandinata & Bimantara Cup; Format: 27XT/128MS/128WS/64MD/64WD/128XD	Score: 21–16, 21–14	
29 October	BWF World Junior Championships (Draw): Host: Waitakere City, New Zealand; Level: Suhandinata & Bimantara Cup; Format: 27XT/128MS/128WS/64MD/64WD/128XD	(China) Wang Lin	(South Korea) Bae Youn-joo
29 October	BWF World Junior Championships (Draw): Host: Waitakere City, New Zealand; Level: Suhandinata & Bimantara Cup; Format: 27XT/128MS/128WS/64MD/64WD/128XD	Score: 21–16, 21–15	
29 October	BWF World Junior Championships (Draw): Host: Waitakere City, New Zealand; Level: Suhandinata & Bimantara Cup; Format: 27XT/128MS/128WS/64MD/64WD/128XD	(South Korea) Chung Eui-seok (South Korea) Shin Baek-cheol	(China) Li Tian (China) Chai Biao
29 October	BWF World Junior Championships (Draw): Host: Waitakere City, New Zealand; Level: Suhandinata & Bimantara Cup; Format: 27XT/128MS/128WS/64MD/64WD/128XD	Score: 24–26, 21–19, 21–15	
29 October	BWF World Junior Championships (Draw): Host: Waitakere City, New Zealand; Level: Suhandinata & Bimantara Cup; Format: 27XT/128MS/128WS/64MD/64WD/128XD	(China) Xie Jing (China) Zhong Qianxin	(South Korea) Yoo Hyun-young (South Korea) Jung Kyung-eun
29 October	BWF World Junior Championships (Draw): Host: Waitakere City, New Zealand; Level: Suhandinata & Bimantara Cup; Format: 27XT/128MS/128WS/64MD/64WD/128XD	Score: 21–18, 10–21, 21–15	
29 October	BWF World Junior Championships (Draw): Host: Waitakere City, New Zealand; Level: Suhandinata & Bimantara Cup; Format: 27XT/128MS/128WS/64MD/64WD/128XD	(Malaysia) Lim Khim Wah (Malaysia) Ng Hui Lin	(England) Chris Adcock (England) Gabrielle White
29 October	BWF World Junior Championships (Draw): Host: Waitakere City, New Zealand; Level: Suhandinata & Bimantara Cup; Format: 27XT/128MS/128WS/64MD/64WD/128XD	Score: 23–25, 22–20, 21–19	
29 October	Syria International: Host: Damascus, Syria; Level: International Series; Prize: $5,000; Format: 64MS/32WS/16MD/8WD/16XD	(India) Arvind Bhat	(Spain) Carlos Longo
29 October	Syria International: Host: Damascus, Syria; Level: International Series; Prize: $5,000; Format: 64MS/32WS/16MD/8WD/16XD	Score: 21–16, 21–18	
29 October	Syria International: Host: Damascus, Syria; Level: International Series; Prize: $5,000; Format: 64MS/32WS/16MD/8WD/16XD	(Portugal) Telma Santos	(Portugal) Filipa Lamy
29 October	Syria International: Host: Damascus, Syria; Level: International Series; Prize: $5,000; Format: 64MS/32WS/16MD/8WD/16XD	Score: 21–16, 21–15	
29 October	Syria International: Host: Damascus, Syria; Level: International Series; Prize: $5,000; Format: 64MS/32WS/16MD/8WD/16XD	(Pakistan) Mohammad Attique (Pakistan) Rizwan Azam	(Sri Lanka) Diluka Karunaratne (Sri Lanka) Dinuka Karunaratne
29 October	Syria International: Host: Damascus, Syria; Level: International Series; Prize: $5,000; Format: 64MS/32WS/16MD/8WD/16XD	Score: 21–9, 21–15	
29 October	Syria International: Host: Damascus, Syria; Level: International Series; Prize: $5,000; Format: 64MS/32WS/16MD/8WD/16XD	(Sri Lanka) Chandrika de Silva (Sri Lanka) Thilini Jayasinghe	(Iran) Sabereh Kabiri (Iran) Sahar Zamanian
29 October	Syria International: Host: Damascus, Syria; Level: International Series; Prize: $5,000; Format: 64MS/32WS/16MD/8WD/16XD	Score: 21–13, 21–18	
29 October	Syria International: Host: Damascus, Syria; Level: International Series; Prize: $5,000; Format: 64MS/32WS/16MD/8WD/16XD	(Slovenia) Luka Petrič (Slovenia) Maja Kersnik	(Syria) Bassel Al-Dora (Syria) Kareem Hadil
29 October	Syria International: Host: Damascus, Syria; Level: International Series; Prize: $5,000; Format: 64MS/32WS/16MD/8WD/16XD	Score: 21–19, 21–12	
29 October	French Open (Draw): Host: Paris, France; Level: Superseries; Prize: $200,000; Format: 32MS/32WS/32MD/32WD/32XD	(Malaysia) Lee Chong Wei	(China) Bao Chunlai
29 October	French Open (Draw): Host: Paris, France; Level: Superseries; Prize: $200,000; Format: 32MS/32WS/32MD/32WD/32XD	Score: 21–11, 21–14	
29 October	French Open (Draw): Host: Paris, France; Level: Superseries; Prize: $200,000; Format: 32MS/32WS/32MD/32WD/32XD	(China) Xie Xingfang	(France) Pi Hongyan
29 October	French Open (Draw): Host: Paris, France; Level: Superseries; Prize: $200,000; Format: 32MS/32WS/32MD/32WD/32XD	Score: 21–13, 21–13	
29 October	French Open (Draw): Host: Paris, France; Level: Superseries; Prize: $200,000; Format: 32MS/32WS/32MD/32WD/32XD	(China) Cai Yun (China) Fu Haifeng	(Malaysia) Choong Tan Fook (Malaysia) Lee Wan Wah
29 October	French Open (Draw): Host: Paris, France; Level: Superseries; Prize: $200,000; Format: 32MS/32WS/32MD/32WD/32XD	Score: 21–14, 21–19	
29 October	French Open (Draw): Host: Paris, France; Level: Superseries; Prize: $200,000; Format: 32MS/32WS/32MD/32WD/32XD	(China) Zhang Yawen (China) Wei Yili	(China) Zhao Tingting (China) Yu Yang
29 October	French Open (Draw): Host: Paris, France; Level: Superseries; Prize: $200,000; Format: 32MS/32WS/32MD/32WD/32XD	Score: 21–10, 21–15	
29 October	French Open (Draw): Host: Paris, France; Level: Superseries; Prize: $200,000; Format: 32MS/32WS/32MD/32WD/32XD	(Indonesia) Flandy Limpele (Indonesia) Vita Marissa	(China) Xie Zhongbo (China) Zhang Yawen
29 October	French Open (Draw): Host: Paris, France; Level: Superseries; Prize: $200,000; Format: 32MS/32WS/32MD/32WD/32XD	Score: 21–11, 21–15	

=== November ===
Week of	Tournament	Champions	Runners-up
1 November	Hungarian International: Host: Budapest, Hungary; Level: International Series; Prize: $5,000; Format: 32MS/32WS/32MD/32WD/32XD	(Denmark) Jan Ø. Jørgensen	(Finland) Ville Lång
1 November	Hungarian International: Host: Budapest, Hungary; Level: International Series; Prize: $5,000; Format: 32MS/32WS/32MD/32WD/32XD	Score: 21–6, 21–5	
1 November	Hungarian International: Host: Budapest, Hungary; Level: International Series; Prize: $5,000; Format: 32MS/32WS/32MD/32WD/32XD	(Iceland) Ragna Ingólfsdóttir	(Switzerland) Jeanine Cicognini
1 November	Hungarian International: Host: Budapest, Hungary; Level: International Series; Prize: $5,000; Format: 32MS/32WS/32MD/32WD/32XD	Score: 21–13, 21–18	
1 November	Hungarian International: Host: Budapest, Hungary; Level: International Series; Prize: $5,000; Format: 32MS/32WS/32MD/32WD/32XD	(Denmark) Mads Pieler Kolding (Denmark) Peter Mørk	(Indonesia) Andi Hartono Tandaputra (Indonesia) Sartono Ekopranoto
1 November	Hungarian International: Host: Budapest, Hungary; Level: International Series; Prize: $5,000; Format: 32MS/32WS/32MD/32WD/32XD	Score: 21–15, 21–15	
1 November	Hungarian International: Host: Budapest, Hungary; Level: International Series; Prize: $5,000; Format: 32MS/32WS/32MD/32WD/32XD	(Denmark) Line Damkjær Kruse (Denmark) Camilla Sørensen	(Sweden) Sophia Hansson (Sweden) Emelie Lennartsson
1 November	Hungarian International: Host: Budapest, Hungary; Level: International Series; Prize: $5,000; Format: 32MS/32WS/32MD/32WD/32XD	Score: 21–11, 21–15	
1 November	Hungarian International: Host: Budapest, Hungary; Level: International Series; Prize: $5,000; Format: 32MS/32WS/32MD/32WD/32XD	(China) Zhang Yi (China) Cai Jiani	(Denmark) Mads Pieler Kolding (Denmark) Line Damkjær Kruse
1 November	Hungarian International: Host: Budapest, Hungary; Level: International Series; Prize: $5,000; Format: 32MS/32WS/32MD/32WD/32XD	Score: 21–15, 21–17	
1 November	Jordan Satellite: Host: Amman, Jordan; Level: International Series; Prize: $5,000; Format: 64MS/32WS/16MD/8WD/16XD	(India) Arvind Bhat	(England) Aamir Ghaffar
1 November	Jordan Satellite: Host: Amman, Jordan; Level: International Series; Prize: $5,000; Format: 64MS/32WS/16MD/8WD/16XD	Score: 21–18, 21–14	
1 November	Jordan Satellite: Host: Amman, Jordan; Level: International Series; Prize: $5,000; Format: 64MS/32WS/16MD/8WD/16XD	(Slovenia) Maja Tvrdy	(Portugal) Telma Santos
1 November	Jordan Satellite: Host: Amman, Jordan; Level: International Series; Prize: $5,000; Format: 64MS/32WS/16MD/8WD/16XD	Score: 21–15, 21–18	
1 November	Jordan Satellite: Host: Amman, Jordan; Level: International Series; Prize: $5,000; Format: 64MS/32WS/16MD/8WD/16XD	(Sri Lanka) Diluka Karunaratne (Sri Lanka) Dinuka Karunaratne	(Iran) Ali Shahhosseini (Iran) Golam Reza Bagheri
1 November	Jordan Satellite: Host: Amman, Jordan; Level: International Series; Prize: $5,000; Format: 64MS/32WS/16MD/8WD/16XD	Score: 21–18, 21–17	
1 November	Jordan Satellite: Host: Amman, Jordan; Level: International Series; Prize: $5,000; Format: 64MS/32WS/16MD/8WD/16XD	(Sri Lanka) Chandrika de Silva (Sri Lanka) Thilini Jayasinghe	(Iran) Sabereh Kabiri (Iran) Sahar Zamanian
1 November	Jordan Satellite: Host: Amman, Jordan; Level: International Series; Prize: $5,000; Format: 64MS/32WS/16MD/8WD/16XD	Score: 21–19, 21–17	
1 November	Jordan Satellite: Host: Amman, Jordan; Level: International Series; Prize: $5,000; Format: 64MS/32WS/16MD/8WD/16XD	(Sri Lanka) Diluka Karunaratne (Sri Lanka) Chandrika de Silva	(Sri Lanka) Anushaka Lakshan (Sri Lanka) Thilini Jayasinghe
1 November	Jordan Satellite: Host: Amman, Jordan; Level: International Series; Prize: $5,000; Format: 64MS/32WS/16MD/8WD/16XD	Score: 21–15, 23–21	
5 November	Vietnam Open: Host: Hanoi, Vietnam; Level: Grand Prix; Prize: $50,000; Format: 32MS/32WS/32MD/32WD/32XD	(Malaysia) Muhd Roslin Hashim	(Indonesia) Andre Kurniawan Tedjono
5 November	Vietnam Open: Host: Hanoi, Vietnam; Level: Grand Prix; Prize: $50,000; Format: 32MS/32WS/32MD/32WD/32XD	Score: 21–12, 23–21	
5 November	Vietnam Open: Host: Hanoi, Vietnam; Level: Grand Prix; Prize: $50,000; Format: 32MS/32WS/32MD/32WD/32XD	(China) Zhu Jingjing	(Japan) Yu Hirayama
5 November	Vietnam Open: Host: Hanoi, Vietnam; Level: Grand Prix; Prize: $50,000; Format: 32MS/32WS/32MD/32WD/32XD	Score: 21–10, 21–10	
5 November	Vietnam Open: Host: Hanoi, Vietnam; Level: Grand Prix; Prize: $50,000; Format: 32MS/32WS/32MD/32WD/32XD	(South Korea) Kwon Yi-goo (South Korea) Ko Sung-hyun	(South Korea) Kang Myeong-won (South Korea) Cho Gun-woo
5 November	Vietnam Open: Host: Hanoi, Vietnam; Level: Grand Prix; Prize: $50,000; Format: 32MS/32WS/32MD/32WD/32XD	Score: 21–17, 21–12	
5 November	Vietnam Open: Host: Hanoi, Vietnam; Level: Grand Prix; Prize: $50,000; Format: 32MS/32WS/32MD/32WD/32XD	(Indonesia) Nathalia Christine Poluakan (Indonesia) Yulianti	(Hong Kong) Chau Hoi Wah (Hong Kong) Koon Wai Chee
5 November	Vietnam Open: Host: Hanoi, Vietnam; Level: Grand Prix; Prize: $50,000; Format: 32MS/32WS/32MD/32WD/32XD	Score: 21–19, 21–15	
5 November	Vietnam Open: Host: Hanoi, Vietnam; Level: Grand Prix; Prize: $50,000; Format: 32MS/32WS/32MD/32WD/32XD	(Indonesia) Tontowi Ahmad (Indonesia) Yulianti	(Hong Kong) Hui Wai Ho (Hong Kong) Chau Hoi Wah
5 November	Vietnam Open: Host: Hanoi, Vietnam; Level: Grand Prix; Prize: $50,000; Format: 32MS/32WS/32MD/32WD/32XD	Score: 21–11, 21–13	
5 November	Iceland International: Host: Reykjavík, Iceland; Level: International Series; Prize: $5,000; Format: 32MS/32WS/16MD/16WD/16XD	(Czech Republic) Petr Koukal	(Portugal) Marco Vasconcelos
5 November	Iceland International: Host: Reykjavík, Iceland; Level: International Series; Prize: $5,000; Format: 32MS/32WS/16MD/16WD/16XD	Score: 21–17, 21–16	
5 November	Iceland International: Host: Reykjavík, Iceland; Level: International Series; Prize: $5,000; Format: 32MS/32WS/16MD/16WD/16XD	(Iceland) Ragna Ingólfsdóttir	(Denmark) Trine Niemeier
5 November	Iceland International: Host: Reykjavík, Iceland; Level: International Series; Prize: $5,000; Format: 32MS/32WS/16MD/16WD/16XD	Score: 21–11, 21–3	
5 November	Iceland International: Host: Reykjavík, Iceland; Level: International Series; Prize: $5,000; Format: 32MS/32WS/16MD/16WD/16XD	(Denmark) Peter Hasbak (Denmark) Jonas Glyager Jensen	(Denmark) Kristoffer Stampe (Denmark) Morten Spurr Madsen
5 November	Iceland International: Host: Reykjavík, Iceland; Level: International Series; Prize: $5,000; Format: 32MS/32WS/16MD/16WD/16XD	Score: 21–16, 18–21, 21–18	
5 November	Iceland International: Host: Reykjavík, Iceland; Level: International Series; Prize: $5,000; Format: 32MS/32WS/16MD/16WD/16XD	(Iceland) Katrín Atladóttir (Iceland) Ragna Ingólfsdóttir	(Iceland) Sara Jónsdóttir (Iceland) Tinna Helgadóttir
5 November	Iceland International: Host: Reykjavík, Iceland; Level: International Series; Prize: $5,000; Format: 32MS/32WS/16MD/16WD/16XD	Score: 21–18, 21–23, 21–17	
5 November	Iceland International: Host: Reykjavík, Iceland; Level: International Series; Prize: $5,000; Format: 32MS/32WS/16MD/16WD/16XD	(Denmark) Jonas Glyager Jensen (Denmark) Maria Thorberg	(Denmark) Peter Mørk (Denmark) Trine Niemeier
5 November	Iceland International: Host: Reykjavík, Iceland; Level: International Series; Prize: $5,000; Format: 32MS/32WS/16MD/16WD/16XD	Score: 21–9, 18–21, 21–14	
12 November	Malaysia International: Host: Alor Setar, Malaysia; Level: International Challenge; Prize: $15,000; Format: 64MS/64WS/64MD/64WD/64XD	(Malaysia) Sairul Amar Ayob	(Malaysia) Tan Chun Seang
12 November	Malaysia International: Host: Alor Setar, Malaysia; Level: International Challenge; Prize: $15,000; Format: 64MS/64WS/64MD/64WD/64XD	Score: 21–13, 21–14	
12 November	Malaysia International: Host: Alor Setar, Malaysia; Level: International Challenge; Prize: $15,000; Format: 64MS/64WS/64MD/64WD/64XD	(Thailand) Porntip Buranaprasertsuk	(Malaysia) Julia Wong Pei Xian
12 November	Malaysia International: Host: Alor Setar, Malaysia; Level: International Challenge; Prize: $15,000; Format: 64MS/64WS/64MD/64WD/64XD	Score: 21–11, 21–19	
12 November	Malaysia International: Host: Alor Setar, Malaysia; Level: International Challenge; Prize: $15,000; Format: 64MS/64WS/64MD/64WD/64XD	(Malaysia) Chang Hun Pin (Malaysia) Chan Peng Soon	(Malaysia) Khoo Chung Chiat (Malaysia) Mohd Razif Abdul Latif
12 November	Malaysia International: Host: Alor Setar, Malaysia; Level: International Challenge; Prize: $15,000; Format: 64MS/64WS/64MD/64WD/64XD	Score: 21–14, 11–21, 21–11	
12 November	Malaysia International: Host: Alor Setar, Malaysia; Level: International Challenge; Prize: $15,000; Format: 64MS/64WS/64MD/64WD/64XD	(Malaysia) Haw Chiou Hwee (Malaysia) Lim Pek Siah	(Malaysia) Ng Hui Lin (Malaysia) Goh Liu Ying
12 November	Malaysia International: Host: Alor Setar, Malaysia; Level: International Challenge; Prize: $15,000; Format: 64MS/64WS/64MD/64WD/64XD	Score: 23–21, 19–21, 21–11	
12 November	Malaysia International: Host: Alor Setar, Malaysia; Level: International Challenge; Prize: $15,000; Format: 64MS/64WS/64MD/64WD/64XD	(Malaysia) Lim Khim Wah (Malaysia) Ng Hui Lin	(Malaysia) Tan Wee Kiong (Malaysia) Woon Khe Wei
12 November	Malaysia International: Host: Alor Setar, Malaysia; Level: International Challenge; Prize: $15,000; Format: 64MS/64WS/64MD/64WD/64XD	Score: 21–15, 21–14	
12 November	Norwegian International: Host: Oslo, Norway; Level: International Challenge; Prize: $15,000; Format: 32MS/32WS/32MD/32WD/32XD	(Germany) Marc Zwiebler	(Denmark) Kasper Ødum
12 November	Norwegian International: Host: Oslo, Norway; Level: International Challenge; Prize: $15,000; Format: 32MS/32WS/32MD/32WD/32XD	Score: 21–15, 11–21, 23–21	
12 November	Norwegian International: Host: Oslo, Norway; Level: International Challenge; Prize: $15,000; Format: 32MS/32WS/32MD/32WD/32XD	(Germany) Juliane Schenk	(Ukraine) Larisa Griga
12 November	Norwegian International: Host: Oslo, Norway; Level: International Challenge; Prize: $15,000; Format: 32MS/32WS/32MD/32WD/32XD	Score: 21–12, 21–17	
12 November	Norwegian International: Host: Oslo, Norway; Level: International Challenge; Prize: $15,000; Format: 32MS/32WS/32MD/32WD/32XD	(United States) Khan Malaythong (United States) Howard Bach	(Denmark) Mikkel Delbo Larsen (Denmark) Jacob Chemnitz
12 November	Norwegian International: Host: Oslo, Norway; Level: International Challenge; Prize: $15,000; Format: 32MS/32WS/32MD/32WD/32XD	Score: 21–15, 21–11	
12 November	Norwegian International: Host: Oslo, Norway; Level: International Challenge; Prize: $15,000; Format: 32MS/32WS/32MD/32WD/32XD	(Russia) Ekaterina Ananina (Russia) Anastasia Russkikh	(Russia) Valeria Sorokina (Russia) Nina Vislova
12 November	Norwegian International: Host: Oslo, Norway; Level: International Challenge; Prize: $15,000; Format: 32MS/32WS/32MD/32WD/32XD	Score: 21–14, 20–22, 21–13	
12 November	Norwegian International: Host: Oslo, Norway; Level: International Challenge; Prize: $15,000; Format: 32MS/32WS/32MD/32WD/32XD	(Germany) Kristof Hopp (Germany) Birgit Overzier	(Russia) Vitalij Durkin (Russia) Valeria Sorokina
12 November	Norwegian International: Host: Oslo, Norway; Level: International Challenge; Prize: $15,000; Format: 32MS/32WS/32MD/32WD/32XD	Score: 21–15, 13–21, 21–15	
19 November	China Open (Draw): Host: Guangzhou, China; Level: Superseries; Prize: $250,000; Format: 32MS/32WS/32MD/32WD/32XD	(China) Bao Chunlai	(Malaysia) Lee Chong Wei
19 November	China Open (Draw): Host: Guangzhou, China; Level: Superseries; Prize: $250,000; Format: 32MS/32WS/32MD/32WD/32XD	Score: 21–12, 21–13	
19 November	China Open (Draw): Host: Guangzhou, China; Level: Superseries; Prize: $250,000; Format: 32MS/32WS/32MD/32WD/32XD	(Malaysia) Wong Mew Choo	(China) Xie Xingfang
19 November	China Open (Draw): Host: Guangzhou, China; Level: Superseries; Prize: $250,000; Format: 32MS/32WS/32MD/32WD/32XD	Score: 21–16, 8–21, 21–17	
19 November	China Open (Draw): Host: Guangzhou, China; Level: Superseries; Prize: $250,000; Format: 32MS/32WS/32MD/32WD/32XD	(Indonesia) Markis Kido (Indonesia) Hendra Setiawan	(China) Guo Zhendong (China) Xie Zhongbo
19 November	China Open (Draw): Host: Guangzhou, China; Level: Superseries; Prize: $250,000; Format: 32MS/32WS/32MD/32WD/32XD	Score: 21–12, 21–19	
19 November	China Open (Draw): Host: Guangzhou, China; Level: Superseries; Prize: $250,000; Format: 32MS/32WS/32MD/32WD/32XD	(China) Gao Ling (China) Zhao Tingting	(China) Du Jing (China) Yu Yang
19 November	China Open (Draw): Host: Guangzhou, China; Level: Superseries; Prize: $250,000; Format: 32MS/32WS/32MD/32WD/32XD	Score: 17–21, 21–15, 21–8	
19 November	China Open (Draw): Host: Guangzhou, China; Level: Superseries; Prize: $250,000; Format: 32MS/32WS/32MD/32WD/32XD	(Indonesia) Nova Widianto (Indonesia) Liliyana Natsir	(Thailand) Sudket Prapakamol (Thailand) Saralee Thungthongkam
19 November	China Open (Draw): Host: Guangzhou, China; Level: Superseries; Prize: $250,000; Format: 32MS/32WS/32MD/32WD/32XD	Score: 15–21, 21–18, 21–11	
19 November	Scottish International: Host: Glasgow, Scotland; Level: International Challenge; Prize: $15,000; Format: 64MS/64WS/32MD/32WD/32XD	(Japan) Kenichi Tago	(Germany) Björn Joppien
19 November	Scottish International: Host: Glasgow, Scotland; Level: International Challenge; Prize: $15,000; Format: 64MS/64WS/32MD/32WD/32XD	Score: 11–21, 21–15, 21–18	
19 November	Scottish International: Host: Glasgow, Scotland; Level: International Challenge; Prize: $15,000; Format: 64MS/64WS/32MD/32WD/32XD	(Japan) Kanako Yonekura	(England) Elizabeth Cann
19 November	Scottish International: Host: Glasgow, Scotland; Level: International Challenge; Prize: $15,000; Format: 64MS/64WS/32MD/32WD/32XD	Score: 21–19, 18–21, 21–17	
19 November	Scottish International: Host: Glasgow, Scotland; Level: International Challenge; Prize: $15,000; Format: 64MS/64WS/32MD/32WD/32XD	(England) Robert Blair (England) David Lindley	(Russia) Vitalij Durkin (Russia) Aleksandr Nikolaenko
19 November	Scottish International: Host: Glasgow, Scotland; Level: International Challenge; Prize: $15,000; Format: 64MS/64WS/32MD/32WD/32XD	Score: 21–18, 21–12	
19 November	Scottish International: Host: Glasgow, Scotland; Level: International Challenge; Prize: $15,000; Format: 64MS/64WS/32MD/32WD/32XD	(Russia) Valeria Sorokina (Russia) Nina Vislova	(England) Gabrielle White (England) Mariana Agathangelou
19 November	Scottish International: Host: Glasgow, Scotland; Level: International Challenge; Prize: $15,000; Format: 64MS/64WS/32MD/32WD/32XD	Score: 21–14, 21–14	
19 November	Scottish International: Host: Glasgow, Scotland; Level: International Challenge; Prize: $15,000; Format: 64MS/64WS/32MD/32WD/32XD	(England) Robert Blair (Scotland) Imogen Bankier	(Russia) Aleksandr Nikolaenko (Russia) Nina Vislova
19 November	Scottish International: Host: Glasgow, Scotland; Level: International Challenge; Prize: $15,000; Format: 64MS/64WS/32MD/32WD/32XD	Score: 15–21, 22–20, 21–9	
19 November	Pakistan International: Host: Islamabad, Pakistan; Level: International Challenge; Prize: $15,000; Format: 64MS/32WS/16MD/8WD/8XD	(Canada) Bobby Milroy	(India) Arvind Bhat
19 November	Pakistan International: Host: Islamabad, Pakistan; Level: International Challenge; Prize: $15,000; Format: 64MS/32WS/16MD/8WD/8XD	Score: 21–14, 15–21, 21–15	
19 November	Pakistan International: Host: Islamabad, Pakistan; Level: International Challenge; Prize: $15,000; Format: 64MS/32WS/16MD/8WD/8XD	(Slovenia) Maja Tvrdy	(Slovenia) Maja Kersnik
19 November	Pakistan International: Host: Islamabad, Pakistan; Level: International Challenge; Prize: $15,000; Format: 64MS/32WS/16MD/8WD/8XD	Score: 21–16, 21–14	
19 November	Pakistan International: Host: Islamabad, Pakistan; Level: International Challenge; Prize: $15,000; Format: 64MS/32WS/16MD/8WD/8XD	(Pakistan) Muhammad Waqas Ahmad (Pakistan) Sulehri Kashif	(Pakistan) Mohammad Attique (Pakistan) Rizwan Azam
19 November	Pakistan International: Host: Islamabad, Pakistan; Level: International Challenge; Prize: $15,000; Format: 64MS/32WS/16MD/8WD/8XD	Score: 21–17, 21–18	
19 November	Pakistan International: Host: Islamabad, Pakistan; Level: International Challenge; Prize: $15,000; Format: 64MS/32WS/16MD/8WD/8XD	(India) Jwala Gutta (India) Shruti Kurien	(Sri Lanka) Renu Chandrika Hettiarachchige (Sri Lanka) Thilini Jayasinghe
19 November	Pakistan International: Host: Islamabad, Pakistan; Level: International Challenge; Prize: $15,000; Format: 64MS/32WS/16MD/8WD/8XD	Score: 21–13, 21–14	
19 November	Pakistan International: Host: Islamabad, Pakistan; Level: International Challenge; Prize: $15,000; Format: 64MS/32WS/16MD/8WD/8XD	(India) Valiyaveetil Diju (India) Aparna Balan	(Sri Lanka) Diluka Karunaratne (Sri Lanka) Renu Chandrika Hettiarachchige
19 November	Pakistan International: Host: Islamabad, Pakistan; Level: International Challenge; Prize: $15,000; Format: 64MS/32WS/16MD/8WD/8XD	Score: 21–11, 21–14	
26 November	Korea International: Host: Suwon, South Korea; Level: International Challenge; Prize: $15,000; Format: 64MS/64WS/32MD/32WD/32XD	(South Korea) Shon Seung-mo	(Japan) Kenichi Tago
26 November	Korea International: Host: Suwon, South Korea; Level: International Challenge; Prize: $15,000; Format: 64MS/64WS/32MD/32WD/32XD	Score: 21–15, 18–21, 21–10	
26 November	Korea International: Host: Suwon, South Korea; Level: International Challenge; Prize: $15,000; Format: 64MS/64WS/32MD/32WD/32XD	(South Korea) Lee Yun-hwa	(South Korea) Jang Soo-young
26 November	Korea International: Host: Suwon, South Korea; Level: International Challenge; Prize: $15,000; Format: 64MS/64WS/32MD/32WD/32XD	Score: 23–21, 21–15	
26 November	Korea International: Host: Suwon, South Korea; Level: International Challenge; Prize: $15,000; Format: 64MS/64WS/32MD/32WD/32XD	(South Korea) Ko Sung-hyun (South Korea) Kwon Yi-goo	(South Korea) Hong In-pyo (South Korea) Choi Min-ho
26 November	Korea International: Host: Suwon, South Korea; Level: International Challenge; Prize: $15,000; Format: 64MS/64WS/32MD/32WD/32XD	Score: 21–10, 21–13	
26 November	Korea International: Host: Suwon, South Korea; Level: International Challenge; Prize: $15,000; Format: 64MS/64WS/32MD/32WD/32XD	(South Korea) Yoo Hyun-young (South Korea) Jung Kyung-eun	(South Korea) Lee Seul-gi (South Korea) Bae Seung-hee
26 November	Korea International: Host: Suwon, South Korea; Level: International Challenge; Prize: $15,000; Format: 64MS/64WS/32MD/32WD/32XD	Score: 21–18, 21–4	
26 November	Korea International: Host: Suwon, South Korea; Level: International Challenge; Prize: $15,000; Format: 64MS/64WS/32MD/32WD/32XD	(South Korea) Shin Baek-choel (South Korea) Yoo Hyun-young	(South Korea) Kim Sung-kwan (South Korea) Ham Hyo-jin
26 November	Korea International: Host: Suwon, South Korea; Level: International Challenge; Prize: $15,000; Format: 64MS/64WS/32MD/32WD/32XD	Score: 22–20, 21–3	
26 November	Hong Kong Open (Draw): Host: Wan Chai, Hong Kong; Level: Superseries; Prize: $250,000; Format: 32MS/32WS/32MD/32WD/32XD	(China) Lin Dan	(Malaysia) Lee Chong Wei
26 November	Hong Kong Open (Draw): Host: Wan Chai, Hong Kong; Level: Superseries; Prize: $250,000; Format: 32MS/32WS/32MD/32WD/32XD	Score: 9–21, 21–15, 21–15	
26 November	Hong Kong Open (Draw): Host: Wan Chai, Hong Kong; Level: Superseries; Prize: $250,000; Format: 32MS/32WS/32MD/32WD/32XD	(China) Xie Xingfang	(China) Zhu Lin
26 November	Hong Kong Open (Draw): Host: Wan Chai, Hong Kong; Level: Superseries; Prize: $250,000; Format: 32MS/32WS/32MD/32WD/32XD	Score: 21–19, 21–14	
26 November	Hong Kong Open (Draw): Host: Wan Chai, Hong Kong; Level: Superseries; Prize: $250,000; Format: 32MS/32WS/32MD/32WD/32XD	(Indonesia) Markis Kido (Indonesia) Hendra Setiawan	(United States) Tony Gunawan (Indonesia) Candra Wijaya
26 November	Hong Kong Open (Draw): Host: Wan Chai, Hong Kong; Level: Superseries; Prize: $250,000; Format: 32MS/32WS/32MD/32WD/32XD	Score: 21–12, 18–21, 21–13	
26 November	Hong Kong Open (Draw): Host: Wan Chai, Hong Kong; Level: Superseries; Prize: $250,000; Format: 32MS/32WS/32MD/32WD/32XD	(China) Du Jing (China) Yu Yang	(China) Wei Yili (China) Zhang Yawen
26 November	Hong Kong Open (Draw): Host: Wan Chai, Hong Kong; Level: Superseries; Prize: $250,000; Format: 32MS/32WS/32MD/32WD/32XD	Score: 22–20, 13–21, 21–17	
26 November	Hong Kong Open (Draw): Host: Wan Chai, Hong Kong; Level: Superseries; Prize: $250,000; Format: 32MS/32WS/32MD/32WD/32XD	(Indonesia) Nova Widianto (Indonesia) Liliyana Natsir	(China) Zheng Bo (China) Gao Ling
26 November	Hong Kong Open (Draw): Host: Wan Chai, Hong Kong; Level: Superseries; Prize: $250,000; Format: 32MS/32WS/32MD/32WD/32XD	Score: 21–23, 21–18, 21–19	
26 November	South Africa International: Host: Pretoria, South Africa; Level: Future Series; Format: 64MS/32WS/32MD/16WD/32XD	(Iran) Kaveh Mehrabi	(Spain) Carlos Longo
26 November	South Africa International: Host: Pretoria, South Africa; Level: Future Series; Format: 64MS/32WS/32MD/16WD/32XD	Score: 19–21, 21–17, 21–15	
26 November	South Africa International: Host: Pretoria, South Africa; Level: Future Series; Format: 64MS/32WS/32MD/16WD/32XD	(Spain) Lucia Tavera	(Egypt) Hadia Hosny
26 November	South Africa International: Host: Pretoria, South Africa; Level: Future Series; Format: 64MS/32WS/32MD/16WD/32XD	Score: 21–7, 21–15	
26 November	South Africa International: Host: Pretoria, South Africa; Level: Future Series; Format: 64MS/32WS/32MD/16WD/32XD	(South Africa) Dorian James (South Africa) Willem Viljoen	(South Africa) Chris Dednam (South Africa) Roelof Dednam
26 November	South Africa International: Host: Pretoria, South Africa; Level: Future Series; Format: 64MS/32WS/32MD/16WD/32XD	Score: 21–12, 21–18	
26 November	South Africa International: Host: Pretoria, South Africa; Level: Future Series; Format: 64MS/32WS/32MD/16WD/32XD	(South Africa) Annari Viljoen (South Africa) Jade Morgan	(South Africa) Michelle Edwards (South Africa) Chantal Botts
26 November	South Africa International: Host: Pretoria, South Africa; Level: Future Series; Format: 64MS/32WS/32MD/16WD/32XD	Score: 23–21, 21–18	
26 November	South Africa International: Host: Pretoria, South Africa; Level: Future Series; Format: 64MS/32WS/32MD/16WD/32XD	(South Africa) Chris Dednam (South Africa) Annari Viljoen	(South Africa) Willem Viljoen (South Africa) Jade Morgan
26 November	South Africa International: Host: Pretoria, South Africa; Level: Future Series; Format: 64MS/32WS/32MD/16WD/32XD	Score: 21–14, 12–21, 21–15	
26 November	Welsh International: Host: Cardiff, Wales; Level: International Series; Prize: $5,000; Format: 32MS/32WS/32MD/32WD/32XD	(Germany) Marc Zwiebler	(Wales) Irwansyah
26 November	Welsh International: Host: Cardiff, Wales; Level: International Series; Prize: $5,000; Format: 32MS/32WS/32MD/32WD/32XD	Score: 21–16, 21–13	
26 November	Welsh International: Host: Cardiff, Wales; Level: International Series; Prize: $5,000; Format: 32MS/32WS/32MD/32WD/32XD	(England) Jill Pittard	(England) Helen Davies
26 November	Welsh International: Host: Cardiff, Wales; Level: International Series; Prize: $5,000; Format: 32MS/32WS/32MD/32WD/32XD	Score: 18–21, 21–17, 21–9	
26 November	Welsh International: Host: Cardiff, Wales; Level: International Series; Prize: $5,000; Format: 32MS/32WS/32MD/32WD/32XD	(Poland) Wojciech Szkudlarczyk (Poland) Adam Cwalina	(England) Matthew Honey (England) Peter Mills
26 November	Welsh International: Host: Cardiff, Wales; Level: International Series; Prize: $5,000; Format: 32MS/32WS/32MD/32WD/32XD	Score: 21–10, 20–22, 21–15	
26 November	Welsh International: Host: Cardiff, Wales; Level: International Series; Prize: $5,000; Format: 32MS/32WS/32MD/32WD/32XD	(Republic of Ireland) Chloe Magee (Republic of Ireland) Bing Huang	(England) Sarah Walker (England) Samantha Ward
26 November	Welsh International: Host: Cardiff, Wales; Level: International Series; Prize: $5,000; Format: 32MS/32WS/32MD/32WD/32XD	Score: 21–11, 21–14	
26 November	Welsh International: Host: Cardiff, Wales; Level: International Series; Prize: $5,000; Format: 32MS/32WS/32MD/32WD/32XD	(Poland) Adam Cwalina (Poland) Małgorzata Kurdelska	(Netherlands) Jorrit de Ruiter (Netherlands) Ilse Vaessen
26 November	Welsh International: Host: Cardiff, Wales; Level: International Series; Prize: $5,000; Format: 32MS/32WS/32MD/32WD/32XD	Score: 21–16, 21–19	

=== December ===
Week of	Tournament	Champions	Runners-up
1 December	India International Challenge: Host: Guwahati, India; Level: International Challenge; Prize: $15,000; Format: 64MS/32WS/16MD/16WD/16XD	(Malaysia) Chong Wei Feng	(India) Chetan Anand
1 December	India International Challenge: Host: Guwahati, India; Level: International Challenge; Prize: $15,000; Format: 64MS/32WS/16MD/16WD/16XD	Score: 21–18, 20–22, 21–15	
1 December	India International Challenge: Host: Guwahati, India; Level: International Challenge; Prize: $15,000; Format: 64MS/32WS/16MD/16WD/16XD	(Japan) Kanako Yonekura	(India) Saina Nehwal
1 December	India International Challenge: Host: Guwahati, India; Level: International Challenge; Prize: $15,000; Format: 64MS/32WS/16MD/16WD/16XD	Score: 21–13, 21–18	
1 December	India International Challenge: Host: Guwahati, India; Level: International Challenge; Prize: $15,000; Format: 64MS/32WS/16MD/16WD/16XD	(Malaysia) Chang Hun Pin (Malaysia) Chan Peng Soon	(India) James Jayan (India) T. Dinesh
1 December	India International Challenge: Host: Guwahati, India; Level: International Challenge; Prize: $15,000; Format: 64MS/32WS/16MD/16WD/16XD	Score: 21–8, 21–15	
1 December	India International Challenge: Host: Guwahati, India; Level: International Challenge; Prize: $15,000; Format: 64MS/32WS/16MD/16WD/16XD	(India) Jwala Gutta (India) Shruti Kurien	(India) Aparna Balan (India) Jyotshna Polavarapu
1 December	India International Challenge: Host: Guwahati, India; Level: International Challenge; Prize: $15,000; Format: 64MS/32WS/16MD/16WD/16XD	Score: 21–11, 21–8	
1 December	India International Challenge: Host: Guwahati, India; Level: International Challenge; Prize: $15,000; Format: 64MS/32WS/16MD/16WD/16XD	(India) Valiyaveetil Diju (India) Jwala Gutta	(India) Rupesh Kumar (India) Aparna Balan
1 December	India International Challenge: Host: Guwahati, India; Level: International Challenge; Prize: $15,000; Format: 64MS/32WS/16MD/16WD/16XD	Score: 21–14, 21–16	
3 December	Russian Open: Host: Moscow, Russia; Level: Grand Prix Gold; Prize: $125,000; Format: 64MS/32WS/32MD/32WD/32XD	(China) Lu Yi	(Indonesia) Andre Kurniawan Tedjono
3 December	Russian Open: Host: Moscow, Russia; Level: Grand Prix Gold; Prize: $125,000; Format: 64MS/32WS/32MD/32WD/32XD	Score: 21–19, 11–21, 21–10	
3 December	Russian Open: Host: Moscow, Russia; Level: Grand Prix Gold; Prize: $125,000; Format: 64MS/32WS/32MD/32WD/32XD	(China) Wang Yihan	(Germany) Xu Huaiwen
3 December	Russian Open: Host: Moscow, Russia; Level: Grand Prix Gold; Prize: $125,000; Format: 64MS/32WS/32MD/32WD/32XD	Score: 21–17, 16–21, 21–19	
3 December	Russian Open: Host: Moscow, Russia; Level: Grand Prix Gold; Prize: $125,000; Format: 64MS/32WS/32MD/32WD/32XD	(Germany) Kristof Hopp (Germany) Ingo Kindervater	(Japan) Shuichi Sakamato (Japan) Shintaro Ikeda
3 December	Russian Open: Host: Moscow, Russia; Level: Grand Prix Gold; Prize: $125,000; Format: 64MS/32WS/32MD/32WD/32XD	Score: 21–16, 22–20	
3 December	Russian Open: Host: Moscow, Russia; Level: Grand Prix Gold; Prize: $125,000; Format: 64MS/32WS/32MD/32WD/32XD	(China) Du Jing (China) Yu Yang	(Chinese Taipei) Chien Yu-chin (Chinese Taipei) Cheng Wen-hsing
3 December	Russian Open: Host: Moscow, Russia; Level: Grand Prix Gold; Prize: $125,000; Format: 64MS/32WS/32MD/32WD/32XD	Score: 21–14, 21–14	
3 December	Russian Open: Host: Moscow, Russia; Level: Grand Prix Gold; Prize: $125,000; Format: 64MS/32WS/32MD/32WD/32XD	(Poland) Robert Mateusiak (Poland) Nadieżda Kostiuczyk	(China) He Hanbin (China) Yu Yang
3 December	Russian Open: Host: Moscow, Russia; Level: Grand Prix Gold; Prize: $125,000; Format: 64MS/32WS/32MD/32WD/32XD	Score: 25–23, 13–21, 21–13	
3 December	Irish International: Host: Lisburn, Northern Ireland; Level: International Challenge; Prize: $16,000; Format: 32MS/32WS/32MD/32WD/32XD	(Denmark) Peter Mikkelsen	(Germany) Marc Zwiebler
3 December	Irish International: Host: Lisburn, Northern Ireland; Level: International Challenge; Prize: $16,000; Format: 32MS/32WS/32MD/32WD/32XD	Score: 21–19, 21–18	
3 December	Irish International: Host: Lisburn, Northern Ireland; Level: International Challenge; Prize: $16,000; Format: 32MS/32WS/32MD/32WD/32XD	(England) Elizabeth Cann	(Japan) Kaori Mori
3 December	Irish International: Host: Lisburn, Northern Ireland; Level: International Challenge; Prize: $16,000; Format: 32MS/32WS/32MD/32WD/32XD	Score: 21–19, 21–9	
3 December	Irish International: Host: Lisburn, Northern Ireland; Level: International Challenge; Prize: $16,000; Format: 32MS/32WS/32MD/32WD/32XD	(United States) Khan Malaythong (United States) Howard Bach	(Germany) Michael Fuchs (Germany) Roman Spitko
3 December	Irish International: Host: Lisburn, Northern Ireland; Level: International Challenge; Prize: $16,000; Format: 32MS/32WS/32MD/32WD/32XD	Score: 21–15, 21–17	
3 December	Irish International: Host: Lisburn, Northern Ireland; Level: International Challenge; Prize: $16,000; Format: 32MS/32WS/32MD/32WD/32XD	(Republic of Ireland) Chloe Magee (Republic of Ireland) Bing Huang	(United States) Mesinee Mangkalakiri (United States) Eva Lee
3 December	Irish International: Host: Lisburn, Northern Ireland; Level: International Challenge; Prize: $16,000; Format: 32MS/32WS/32MD/32WD/32XD	Score: 21–15, 9–21, 21–11	
3 December	Irish International: Host: Lisburn, Northern Ireland; Level: International Challenge; Prize: $16,000; Format: 32MS/32WS/32MD/32WD/32XD	(United States) Howard Bach (United States) Eva Lee	(Belgium) Wouter Claes (Belgium) Nathalie Descamps
3 December	Irish International: Host: Lisburn, Northern Ireland; Level: International Challenge; Prize: $16,000; Format: 32MS/32WS/32MD/32WD/32XD	Score: 21–10, 21–13	
3 December	Southeast Asian Games: Host: Nakhon Ratchasima Province, Thailand; Level: Multi-sport event; Format: 8MT/8WT/16MS/16WS/16MD/16WD/16XD	Indonesia	Singapore
3 December	Southeast Asian Games: Host: Nakhon Ratchasima Province, Thailand; Level: Multi-sport event; Format: 8MT/8WT/16MS/16WS/16MD/16WD/16XD	Score: 3–0	
3 December	Southeast Asian Games: Host: Nakhon Ratchasima Province, Thailand; Level: Multi-sport event; Format: 8MT/8WT/16MS/16WS/16MD/16WD/16XD	Indonesia	Singapore
3 December	Southeast Asian Games: Host: Nakhon Ratchasima Province, Thailand; Level: Multi-sport event; Format: 8MT/8WT/16MS/16WS/16MD/16WD/16XD	Score: 3–2	
3 December	Southeast Asian Games: Host: Nakhon Ratchasima Province, Thailand; Level: Multi-sport event; Format: 8MT/8WT/16MS/16WS/16MD/16WD/16XD	(Indonesia) Taufik Hidayat	(Singapore) Kendrick Lee
3 December	Southeast Asian Games: Host: Nakhon Ratchasima Province, Thailand; Level: Multi-sport event; Format: 8MT/8WT/16MS/16WS/16MD/16WD/16XD	Score: 21–15, 21–9	
3 December	Southeast Asian Games: Host: Nakhon Ratchasima Province, Thailand; Level: Multi-sport event; Format: 8MT/8WT/16MS/16WS/16MD/16WD/16XD	(Indonesia) Maria Kristin Yulianti	(Indonesia) Adriyanti Firdasari
3 December	Southeast Asian Games: Host: Nakhon Ratchasima Province, Thailand; Level: Multi-sport event; Format: 8MT/8WT/16MS/16WS/16MD/16WD/16XD	Score: 21–16, 21–15	
3 December	Southeast Asian Games: Host: Nakhon Ratchasima Province, Thailand; Level: Multi-sport event; Format: 8MT/8WT/16MS/16WS/16MD/16WD/16XD	(Indonesia) Markis Kido (Indonesia) Hendra Setiawan	(Singapore) Hendra Wijaya (Singapore) Hendri Saputra
3 December	Southeast Asian Games: Host: Nakhon Ratchasima Province, Thailand; Level: Multi-sport event; Format: 8MT/8WT/16MS/16WS/16MD/16WD/16XD	Score: 21–17, 21–12	
3 December	Southeast Asian Games: Host: Nakhon Ratchasima Province, Thailand; Level: Multi-sport event; Format: 8MT/8WT/16MS/16WS/16MD/16WD/16XD	(Indonesia) Liliyana Natsir (Indonesia) Vita Marissa	(Indonesia) Jo Novita (Indonesia) Greysia Polii
3 December	Southeast Asian Games: Host: Nakhon Ratchasima Province, Thailand; Level: Multi-sport event; Format: 8MT/8WT/16MS/16WS/16MD/16WD/16XD	Score: 21–15, 21–14	
3 December	Southeast Asian Games: Host: Nakhon Ratchasima Province, Thailand; Level: Multi-sport event; Format: 8MT/8WT/16MS/16WS/16MD/16WD/16XD	(Indonesia) Flandy Limpele (Indonesia) Vita Marissa	(Thailand) Sudket Prapakamol (Thailand) Saralee Thungthongkam
3 December	Southeast Asian Games: Host: Nakhon Ratchasima Province, Thailand; Level: Multi-sport event; Format: 8MT/8WT/16MS/16WS/16MD/16WD/16XD	Score: 21–14, 21–15	
10 December	Italian International: Host: Rome, Italy; Level: International Challenge; Prize: $15,000; Format: 32MS/32WS/32MD/32WD/32XD	(Japan) Sho Sasaki	(Canada) Andrew Dabeka
10 December	Italian International: Host: Rome, Italy; Level: International Challenge; Prize: $15,000; Format: 32MS/32WS/32MD/32WD/32XD	Score: 21–6, 16–21, 21–17	
10 December	Italian International: Host: Rome, Italy; Level: International Challenge; Prize: $15,000; Format: 32MS/32WS/32MD/32WD/32XD	(Germany) Juliane Schenk	(Sweden) Sara Persson
10 December	Italian International: Host: Rome, Italy; Level: International Challenge; Prize: $15,000; Format: 32MS/32WS/32MD/32WD/32XD	Score: 21–16, 21–6	
10 December	Italian International: Host: Rome, Italy; Level: International Challenge; Prize: $15,000; Format: 32MS/32WS/32MD/32WD/32XD	(Denmark) Mathias Boe (Denmark) Carsten Mogensen	(Indonesia) Rian Sukmawan (Indonesia) Yonathan Suryatama Dasuki
10 December	Italian International: Host: Rome, Italy; Level: International Challenge; Prize: $15,000; Format: 32MS/32WS/32MD/32WD/32XD	Score: 21–18, 16–21, 21–11	
10 December	Italian International: Host: Rome, Italy; Level: International Challenge; Prize: $15,000; Format: 32MS/32WS/32MD/32WD/32XD	(Russia) Anastasia Russkikh (Russia) Ekaterina Ananina	(Russia) Valeria Sorokina (Russia) Nina Vislova
10 December	Italian International: Host: Rome, Italy; Level: International Challenge; Prize: $15,000; Format: 32MS/32WS/32MD/32WD/32XD	Score: 21–15, 26–24	
10 December	Italian International: Host: Rome, Italy; Level: International Challenge; Prize: $15,000; Format: 32MS/32WS/32MD/32WD/32XD	(Russia) Aleksandr Nikolaenko (Russia) Nina Vislova	(Russia) Vitalij Durkin (Russia) Valeria Sorokina
10 December	Italian International: Host: Rome, Italy; Level: International Challenge; Prize: $15,000; Format: 32MS/32WS/32MD/32WD/32XD	Score: 21–15, 18–21, 21–16	
10 December	Algeria International: Host: Algiers, Algeria; Level: Future Series; Format: 16MS/16WS	(Algeria) Nabil Lasmari	(Iran) Kaveh Mehrabi
10 December	Algeria International: Host: Algiers, Algeria; Level: Future Series; Format: 16MS/16WS	Score: 21–6, 10–4 Retired	
10 December	Algeria International: Host: Algiers, Algeria; Level: Future Series; Format: 16MS/16WS	(Portugal) Ana Moura	(United States) Shannon Pohl
10 December	Algeria International: Host: Algiers, Algeria; Level: Future Series; Format: 16MS/16WS	Score: 21–12, 21–9	
17 December	Hellas International: Host: Thessaloniki, Greece; Level: International Series; Prize: $5,000; Format: 32MS/32WS/32MD/16WD/32XD	(Germany) Marc Zwiebler	(United States) Raju Rai
17 December	Hellas International: Host: Thessaloniki, Greece; Level: International Series; Prize: $5,000; Format: 32MS/32WS/32MD/16WD/32XD	Score: 21–14, 21–16	
17 December	Hellas International: Host: Thessaloniki, Greece; Level: International Series; Prize: $5,000; Format: 32MS/32WS/32MD/16WD/32XD	(Bulgaria) Petya Nedelcheva	(Iceland) Ragna Ingólfsdóttir
17 December	Hellas International: Host: Thessaloniki, Greece; Level: International Series; Prize: $5,000; Format: 32MS/32WS/32MD/16WD/32XD	Score: Walkover	
17 December	Hellas International: Host: Thessaloniki, Greece; Level: International Series; Prize: $5,000; Format: 32MS/32WS/32MD/16WD/32XD	(Malaysia) Goh Ying Jin (Malaysia) Au Kok Leong	(Denmark) Mikkel Elbjørn (Denmark) Mads Pieler Kolding
17 December	Hellas International: Host: Thessaloniki, Greece; Level: International Series; Prize: $5,000; Format: 32MS/32WS/32MD/16WD/32XD	Score: 21–19, 21–18	
17 December	Hellas International: Host: Thessaloniki, Greece; Level: International Series; Prize: $5,000; Format: 32MS/32WS/32MD/16WD/32XD	(Bulgaria) Diana Dimova (Bulgaria) Petya Nedelcheva	(Denmark) Maria Helsbøl (Denmark) Anne Skelbæk
17 December	Hellas International: Host: Thessaloniki, Greece; Level: International Series; Prize: $5,000; Format: 32MS/32WS/32MD/16WD/32XD	Score: 21–14, 21–15	
17 December	Hellas International: Host: Thessaloniki, Greece; Level: International Series; Prize: $5,000; Format: 32MS/32WS/32MD/16WD/32XD	(Denmark) Mads Pieler Kolding (Denmark) Line Damkjær Kruse	(Denmark) Jeppe Lund (Denmark) Louise Hansen
17 December	Hellas International: Host: Thessaloniki, Greece; Level: International Series; Prize: $5,000; Format: 32MS/32WS/32MD/16WD/32XD	Score: Walkover	
24 December	Copenhagen Masters: Host: Copenhagen, Denmark; Level: Invitation; Format: 6MS/4WS/5MD (round robin)	(Denmark) Peter Gade	(Denmark) Kenneth Jonassen
24 December	Copenhagen Masters: Host: Copenhagen, Denmark; Level: Invitation; Format: 6MS/4WS/5MD (round robin)	Score: 21–18, 23–21	
24 December	Copenhagen Masters: Host: Copenhagen, Denmark; Level: Invitation; Format: 6MS/4WS/5MD (round robin)	(Germany) Xu Huaiwen	(Hong Kong) Zhou Mi
24 December	Copenhagen Masters: Host: Copenhagen, Denmark; Level: Invitation; Format: 6MS/4WS/5MD (round robin)	Score: Walkover	
24 December	Copenhagen Masters: Host: Copenhagen, Denmark; Level: Invitation; Format: 6MS/4WS/5MD (round robin)	(Denmark) Jens Eriksen (Denmark) Martin Lundgaard Hansen	(Malaysia) Mohd Zakry Abdul Latif (Malaysia) Mohd Fairuzizuan Mohd Tazari
24 December	Copenhagen Masters: Host: Copenhagen, Denmark; Level: Invitation; Format: 6MS/4WS/5MD (round robin)	Score: 21–11, 21–17	
