= 2008 BWF season =

2008 BWF Season
Details
- Duration: 7 January 2008 – 28 December 2008

Achievements (singles)

Awards
- Player of the year: (China) Lin Dan (Male) (Hong Kong) Zhou Mi (Female)

The 2008 BWF Season was the overall badminton circuit organized by the Badminton World Federation (BWF) for the 2008 badminton season to publish and promote the sport. Besides the BWF World Championships, BWF promotes the sport of Badminton through an extensive worldwide program of events. These events have various purposes according to their level and territory in which they are held but those events owned by BWF seek to showcase the Sport via the widest possible quality television broadcast and build the fanbase of the Sport throughout the World.

The world badminton tournament structure has four levels: Level 1 (BWF Major Events: Thomas Cup, Uber Cup, Sudirman Cup, Suhadinata Cup, World Championships, Bimantara Cup, and World Senior Championships), Level 2 (BWF Superseries: Superseries and Superseries Masters Finals), Level 3 (BWF Grand Prix: Grand Prix and Grand Prix Gold), and Level 4 (BWF Continental Tournament: International Challenge, International Series, and Future Series). The Thomas Cup & Uber Cup, Sudirman Cup and Suhandinata Cup are Teams Events. The others – Superseries, Grand Prix Events, International Challenge, International Series, Future Series and Bimantara Cup are all individual tournaments. The higher the level of tournament, the larger the prize money and the more ranking points available.

The 2008 BWF Season calendar comprised the Olympic Games, World Championships tournaments, the Thomas & Uber Cup, the BWF Super Series (Super Series and Super Series Masters Finals), the Grand Prix (Grand Prix Gold and Grand Prix), the International Series (International Series and International Challenge), and Future Series.

== Schedule ==
This is the complete schedule of events on the 2008 calendar, with the Champions and Runners-up documented.

Key

World Championships
Super Series Finals
Super Series
Grand Prix Gold
Grand Prix
International Challenge
International Series
Future Series
Team events

=== January ===
Week of	Tournament	Champions	Runners-up
14 January	Malaysia Open (Draw): Host: Kuala Lumpur, Malaysia; Level: Superseries; Format: 32MS/32WS/32MD/32WD/32XD	(Malaysia) Lee Chong Wei	(South Korea) Lee Hyun-il
14 January	Malaysia Open (Draw): Host: Kuala Lumpur, Malaysia; Level: Superseries; Format: 32MS/32WS/32MD/32WD/32XD	Score: 21–15, 11–21, 21–17	
14 January	Malaysia Open (Draw): Host: Kuala Lumpur, Malaysia; Level: Superseries; Format: 32MS/32WS/32MD/32WD/32XD	(Denmark) Tine Rasmussen	(China) Zhu Lin
14 January	Malaysia Open (Draw): Host: Kuala Lumpur, Malaysia; Level: Superseries; Format: 32MS/32WS/32MD/32WD/32XD	Score: 18–21, 21–19, 21–18	
14 January	Malaysia Open (Draw): Host: Kuala Lumpur, Malaysia; Level: Superseries; Format: 32MS/32WS/32MD/32WD/32XD	(Indonesia) Markis Kido (Indonesia) Hendra Setiawan	(Denmark) Lars Paaske (Denmark) Jonas Rasmussen
14 January	Malaysia Open (Draw): Host: Kuala Lumpur, Malaysia; Level: Superseries; Format: 32MS/32WS/32MD/32WD/32XD	Score: 21–10, 20–22, 21–18	
14 January	Malaysia Open (Draw): Host: Kuala Lumpur, Malaysia; Level: Superseries; Format: 32MS/32WS/32MD/32WD/32XD	(China) Yang Wei (China) Zhang Jiewen	(China) Gao Ling (China) Zhao Tingting
14 January	Malaysia Open (Draw): Host: Kuala Lumpur, Malaysia; Level: Superseries; Format: 32MS/32WS/32MD/32WD/32XD	Score: 21–13, 16–21, 24–22	
14 January	Malaysia Open (Draw): Host: Kuala Lumpur, Malaysia; Level: Superseries; Format: 32MS/32WS/32MD/32WD/32XD	(China) He Hanbin (China) Yu Yang	(South Korea) Lee Yong-dae (South Korea) Lee Hyo-jung
14 January	Malaysia Open (Draw): Host: Kuala Lumpur, Malaysia; Level: Superseries; Format: 32MS/32WS/32MD/32WD/32XD	Score: 21–14, 21–15	
21 January	Korea Open (Draw): Host: Seoul, South Korea; Level: Superseries; Format: 32MS/32WS/32MD/32WD/32XD	(South Korea) Lee Hyun-il	(China) Lin Dan
21 January	Korea Open (Draw): Host: Seoul, South Korea; Level: Superseries; Format: 32MS/32WS/32MD/32WD/32XD	Score: 4–21, 23–21, 25–23	
21 January	Korea Open (Draw): Host: Seoul, South Korea; Level: Superseries; Format: 32MS/32WS/32MD/32WD/32XD	(Hong Kong) Zhou Mi	(China) Lu Lan
21 January	Korea Open (Draw): Host: Seoul, South Korea; Level: Superseries; Format: 32MS/32WS/32MD/32WD/32XD	Score: 21–18, 15–21, 21–15	
21 January	Korea Open (Draw): Host: Seoul, South Korea; Level: Superseries; Format: 32MS/32WS/32MD/32WD/32XD	(China) Cai Yun (China) Fu Haifeng	(Indonesia) Luluk Hadiyanto (Indonesia) Alvent Yulianto Chandra
21 January	Korea Open (Draw): Host: Seoul, South Korea; Level: Superseries; Format: 32MS/32WS/32MD/32WD/32XD	Score: 21–7, 20–22, 21–17	
21 January	Korea Open (Draw): Host: Seoul, South Korea; Level: Superseries; Format: 32MS/32WS/32MD/32WD/32XD	(China) Du Jing (China) Yu Yang	(China) Gao Ling (China) Zhao Tingting
21 January	Korea Open (Draw): Host: Seoul, South Korea; Level: Superseries; Format: 32MS/32WS/32MD/32WD/32XD	Score: 21–15, 21–13	
21 January	Korea Open (Draw): Host: Seoul, South Korea; Level: Superseries; Format: 32MS/32WS/32MD/32WD/32XD	(South Korea) Lee Yong-dae (South Korea) Lee Hyo-jung	(Indonesia) Flandy Limpele (Indonesia) Vita Marissa
21 January	Korea Open (Draw): Host: Seoul, South Korea; Level: Superseries; Format: 32MS/32WS/32MD/32WD/32XD	Score: 15–21, 21–14, 21–18	
21 January	Swedish International: Host: Täby, Stockholm, Sweden; Level: International Series; Format: 32MS/32WS/32MD/32WD/32XD	(Germany) Marc Zwiebler	(Denmark) Jan O. Jorgensen
21 January	Swedish International: Host: Täby, Stockholm, Sweden; Level: International Series; Format: 32MS/32WS/32MD/32WD/32XD	Score: 21–13, 23–21	
21 January	Swedish International: Host: Täby, Stockholm, Sweden; Level: International Series; Format: 32MS/32WS/32MD/32WD/32XD	(China) Li Wenyan	(Germany) Janet Koehler
21 January	Swedish International: Host: Täby, Stockholm, Sweden; Level: International Series; Format: 32MS/32WS/32MD/32WD/32XD	Score: 21–8, 21–13	
21 January	Swedish International: Host: Täby, Stockholm, Sweden; Level: International Series; Format: 32MS/32WS/32MD/32WD/32XD	(Denmark) Rasmus Mangor Andersen (Denmark) Peter Steffensen	(Belgium) Frederic Mawet (Belgium) Wouter Claes
21 January	Swedish International: Host: Täby, Stockholm, Sweden; Level: International Series; Format: 32MS/32WS/32MD/32WD/32XD	Score: 21–12, 21–16	
21 January	Swedish International: Host: Täby, Stockholm, Sweden; Level: International Series; Format: 32MS/32WS/32MD/32WD/32XD	(China) Yu Qi (China) Cai Jiani	(China) Zhang Xi (China) Lin Qing
21 January	Swedish International: Host: Täby, Stockholm, Sweden; Level: International Series; Format: 32MS/32WS/32MD/32WD/32XD	Score: 21–16, 21–11	
21 January	Swedish International: Host: Täby, Stockholm, Sweden; Level: International Series; Format: 32MS/32WS/32MD/32WD/32XD	(Denmark) Peter Steffensen (Denmark) Julie Houmann	(Denmark) Mads Pieler Kolding (Denmark) Line Damkjaer Kruse
21 January	Swedish International: Host: Täby, Stockholm, Sweden; Level: International Series; Format: 32MS/32WS/32MD/32WD/32XD	Score: 21–8, 21–17	
21 January	Uganda International: Host: Kampala, Uganda; Level: International Series; Format: 64MS/32WS/16MD	(Lithuania) Kęstutis Navickas	(Sri Lanka) Niluka Karunaratne
21 January	Uganda International: Host: Kampala, Uganda; Level: International Series; Format: 64MS/32WS/16MD	Score: 21–19, 21–13	
21 January	Uganda International: Host: Kampala, Uganda; Level: International Series; Format: 64MS/32WS/16MD	(Italy) Agnese Allegrini	(Peru) Claudia Rivero
21 January	Uganda International: Host: Kampala, Uganda; Level: International Series; Format: 64MS/32WS/16MD	Score: 22–20, 21–10	
21 January	Uganda International: Host: Kampala, Uganda; Level: International Series; Format: 64MS/32WS/16MD	(Sri Lanka) Dinuka Karunaratne (Sri Lanka) Diluka Karunaratne	(Uganda) Ssuan Brian (Uganda) Wilson Tukire
21 January	Uganda International: Host: Kampala, Uganda; Level: International Series; Format: 64MS/32WS/16MD	Score: 21–8, 21–10	

=== February ===
Week of	Tournament	Champions	Runners-up
1 February	Iran Fajr International: Host: Tehran, Iran; Level: International Series; Format: 64MS/32WS/32MD/16WD	(Malaysia) Mohd Arif Abdul Latif	(Lithuania) Kestutis Navickas
1 February	Iran Fajr International: Host: Tehran, Iran; Level: International Series; Format: 64MS/32WS/32MD/16WD	Score: 21–18, 21–18	
1 February	Iran Fajr International: Host: Tehran, Iran; Level: International Series; Format: 64MS/32WS/32MD/16WD	(Italy) Agnese Allegrini	(Portugal) Telma Santos
1 February	Iran Fajr International: Host: Tehran, Iran; Level: International Series; Format: 64MS/32WS/32MD/16WD	Score: 21–10, 16–21, 21–19	
1 February	Iran Fajr International: Host: Tehran, Iran; Level: International Series; Format: 64MS/32WS/32MD/16WD	(Malaysia) Mohd Arif Abdul Latif (Malaysia) Vountus Indra Mawan	(Iran) Ali Shahhosseini (Iran) Nikzad Shiri
1 February	Iran Fajr International: Host: Tehran, Iran; Level: International Series; Format: 64MS/32WS/32MD/16WD	Score: 21–16, 14–21, 21–9	
1 February	Iran Fajr International: Host: Tehran, Iran; Level: International Series; Format: 64MS/32WS/32MD/16WD	(Malaysia) Norshahliza Baharum (Malaysia) Lim Yin Loo	(Sri Lanka) Renu Chandrika Hettiarachchige (Sri Lanka) Thilini Jayasinghe
1 February	Iran Fajr International: Host: Tehran, Iran; Level: International Series; Format: 64MS/32WS/32MD/16WD	Score: 21–12, 21–15	
4 February	Thomas & Uber Cup Oceania Preliminaries: Host: Nouméa, New Caledonia; Level: Continental Team Championships; Format: 2MT/2WT (Round robin)	New Zealand; Players: Alan Bosselman, Craig Cooper, Kevin Dennerly-Minturn, James Eunson, Ethan Haggo, Nathan Hannam, John Moody, Henry Tam, Ellis Thomas, Dylan Tibbo, Joe Wu	Australia; Players: Ashley Brehaut, Stuart Gomez, David Jones, Ross Smith, Jeff Tho, Ben Walklate, Glenn Warfe
4 February	Thomas & Uber Cup Oceania Preliminaries: Host: Nouméa, New Caledonia; Level: Continental Team Championships; Format: 2MT/2WT (Round robin)	Score: 3–2	
4 February	Thomas & Uber Cup Oceania Preliminaries: Host: Nouméa, New Caledonia; Level: Continental Team Championships; Format: 2MT/2WT (Round robin)	New Zealand; Players: Danielle Barry, Michelle Chan, Donna Cranston, Renee Flavell, Rachel Hindley, Jessica Jonggowisastro, Emma Rodgers	Australia; Players: Erin Carroll, Leanne Choo, Leisha Cooper, Tania Luiz, Spoorti Rattan, Eugenia Tanaka
4 February	Thomas & Uber Cup Oceania Preliminaries: Host: Nouméa, New Caledonia; Level: Continental Team Championships; Format: 2MT/2WT (Round robin)	Score: 3–0	
4 February	Oceania Championships (Draw): Host: Nouméa, New Caledonia; Level: Continental Team Championships; Format: 3XT (Round robin) 64MS/16WS/32MD/8WD/16XD	New Zealand	Australia
4 February	Oceania Championships (Draw): Host: Nouméa, New Caledonia; Level: Continental Team Championships; Format: 3XT (Round robin) 64MS/16WS/32MD/8WD/16XD	Score: 2 wins–0 losses / 1 win–1 loss	
4 February	Oceania Championships (Draw): Host: Nouméa, New Caledonia; Level: Continental Team Championships; Format: 3XT (Round robin) 64MS/16WS/32MD/8WD/16XD	(New Zealand) John Moody	(Australia) Stuart Gomez
4 February	Oceania Championships (Draw): Host: Nouméa, New Caledonia; Level: Continental Team Championships; Format: 3XT (Round robin) 64MS/16WS/32MD/8WD/16XD	Score: 21–12, 21–16	
4 February	Oceania Championships (Draw): Host: Nouméa, New Caledonia; Level: Continental Team Championships; Format: 3XT (Round robin) 64MS/16WS/32MD/8WD/16XD	(New Zealand) Michelle Chan	(New Zealand) Rachel Hindley
4 February	Oceania Championships (Draw): Host: Nouméa, New Caledonia; Level: Continental Team Championships; Format: 3XT (Round robin) 64MS/16WS/32MD/8WD/16XD	Score: 26–24, 22–20	
4 February	Oceania Championships (Draw): Host: Nouméa, New Caledonia; Level: Continental Team Championships; Format: 3XT (Round robin) 64MS/16WS/32MD/8WD/16XD	(Australia) Ross Smith (Australia) Glenn Warfe	(New Zealand) Nathan Hannam (New Zealand) Henry Tam
4 February	Oceania Championships (Draw): Host: Nouméa, New Caledonia; Level: Continental Team Championships; Format: 3XT (Round robin) 64MS/16WS/32MD/8WD/16XD	Score: 21–13, 21–18	
4 February	Oceania Championships (Draw): Host: Nouméa, New Caledonia; Level: Continental Team Championships; Format: 3XT (Round robin) 64MS/16WS/32MD/8WD/16XD	(New Zealand) Michelle Chan (New Zealand) Rachel Hindley	(New Zealand) Renee Flavell (New Zealand) Donna Cranston
4 February	Oceania Championships (Draw): Host: Nouméa, New Caledonia; Level: Continental Team Championships; Format: 3XT (Round robin) 64MS/16WS/32MD/8WD/16XD	Score: 21–14, 21–8	
4 February	Oceania Championships (Draw): Host: Nouméa, New Caledonia; Level: Continental Team Championships; Format: 3XT (Round robin) 64MS/16WS/32MD/8WD/16XD	(New Zealand) Henry Tam (New Zealand) Donna Cranston	(New Zealand) Craig Cooper (New Zealand) Renee Flavell
4 February	Oceania Championships (Draw): Host: Nouméa, New Caledonia; Level: Continental Team Championships; Format: 3XT (Round robin) 64MS/16WS/32MD/8WD/16XD	Score: 16–21, 21–19, 21–17	
11 February	European Men's & Women's Team Championships (Draw): Host: Almere, Netherlands; Level: Continental Team Championships; Format: 30MT/27WT (Round robin)	Denmark; Players: Kenneth Jonassen, Peter Gade, Joachim Persson, Jan O. Joergensen, Hans-Kristian Vittinghus, Joachim Fischer, Jens Eriksen, Martin Lundgaard, Carsten Mogensen, Mathias Boe	England; Players: Andrew Smith, Rajiv Ouseph, Nathan Rice, Aamir Ghaffar, Robert Blair, Anthony Clark, Nathan Robertson, David Lindley, Chris Adcock, Robin Middleton
11 February	European Men's & Women's Team Championships (Draw): Host: Almere, Netherlands; Level: Continental Team Championships; Format: 30MT/27WT (Round robin)	Score: 3–0	
11 February	European Men's & Women's Team Championships (Draw): Host: Almere, Netherlands; Level: Continental Team Championships; Format: 30MT/27WT (Round robin)	Denmark; Players: Tine Rasmussen, Camilla Sørensen, Nanna Jensen, Mie Schjoett-Kristensen, Marie Roepke, Lena Frier, Kamilla Rytter Juhl, Helle Nielsen, Christinna Pedersen, Line Damkjær Kruse	Netherlands; Players: Yao Jie, Judith Meulendijks, Rachel Van Cutsen, Patty Stolzenbach, Yik Man Wong, Eefje Muskens, Karina de Wit, Ilse Vaessen, Paulien Van Dooremalen
11 February	European Men's & Women's Team Championships (Draw): Host: Almere, Netherlands; Level: Continental Team Championships; Format: 30MT/27WT (Round robin)	Score: 3–1	
11 February	Thomas & Uber Cup Pan Am Preliminaries: Host: Campinas, Brazil; Level: Continental Team Championships; Format: 4MT/4WT (Round robin)	Canada; Players: Andrew Dabeka, Bobby Milroy, Stephan Wojcikiewicz, William Milroy, Mike Beres, Toby Ng	United States; Players: Raju Rai, Mathew Fogarty, Dean Schoppe, Ted Shear, Daniel Gouw, Christopher Hales, Khan Malaythong, Arnold Setiadi, Howard Bach
11 February	Thomas & Uber Cup Pan Am Preliminaries: Host: Campinas, Brazil; Level: Continental Team Championships; Format: 4MT/4WT (Round robin)	Score: 3–0	
11 February	Thomas & Uber Cup Pan Am Preliminaries: Host: Campinas, Brazil; Level: Continental Team Championships; Format: 4MT/4WT (Round robin)	United States; Players: Eva Lee, Lauren Todt, Kuei Ya Chen, Jamie Subandhi, Mesinee Mangkalakiri, Oanita Phongasavithas, Vimla Phongasavithas, Rena Wang	Canada; Players: Charmaine Reid, Fiona McKee, Valerie Loker, Florence Lavoie, Valerie St Jacques, Michelle Li
11 February	Thomas & Uber Cup Pan Am Preliminaries: Host: Campinas, Brazil; Level: Continental Team Championships; Format: 4MT/4WT (Round robin)	Score: 3–1	
18 February	Thomas & Uber Cup African Preliminaries (Draw): Host: Rose Hill, Mauritius; Level: Continental Team Championships; Format: 7MT/4WT (Round robin)	Nigeria; Players: Greg Okuonghea, Jinkan Bulus, Olaoluwa Fagbemi, Ibrahim Adamu, Akeem Olanrewaju Ogunseye	South Africa; Players: Chris Dednam, Roelof Dednam, Wiaan Viljoen, Dorian James, Enrico James
18 February	Thomas & Uber Cup African Preliminaries (Draw): Host: Rose Hill, Mauritius; Level: Continental Team Championships; Format: 7MT/4WT (Round robin)	Score: 3–0	
18 February	Thomas & Uber Cup African Preliminaries (Draw): Host: Rose Hill, Mauritius; Level: Continental Team Championships; Format: 7MT/4WT (Round robin)	South Africa; Players: Stacey Doubell, Michelle Edwards, Kerry-Lee Harrington, Jade Morgan, Annari Viljoen, Chantal Botts	Nigeria; Players: Grace Daniel, Susan Ideh, Gideon Mary, Imhade Oribabor
18 February	Thomas & Uber Cup African Preliminaries (Draw): Host: Rose Hill, Mauritius; Level: Continental Team Championships; Format: 7MT/4WT (Round robin)	Score: 3–2	
18 February	Thomas & Uber Cups Preliminaries Asia Zone: Host: Ho Chi Minh City, Vietnam; Level: Continental Team Championships; Format: 14MT/11WT (Round robin)	Malaysia; Players: Arif Abdul Latif, Zakry Abdul Latif, Choong Tan Fook, Muhd Hafiz Hashim, Koo Kien Keat, Lee Chong Wei, Lee Wan Wah, Fairuzizuan Tazari, Tan Boon Heong, Wong Choong Hann	South Korea; Players: Cho Gun-woo, Han Sang-hoon, Hwang Ji-man, Jung Jae-sung, Lee Cheol-ho, Lee Hyun-il, Lee Jae-jin, Lee Yong-dae, Park Sung-hwan, Shon Seung-mo
18 February	Thomas & Uber Cups Preliminaries Asia Zone: Host: Ho Chi Minh City, Vietnam; Level: Continental Team Championships; Format: 14MT/11WT (Round robin)	Score: 3–2	
18 February	Thomas & Uber Cups Preliminaries Asia Zone: Host: Ho Chi Minh City, Vietnam; Level: Continental Team Championships; Format: 14MT/11WT (Round robin)	South Korea; Players: Ha Jung-eun, Hwang Hye-youn, Hwang Yu-mi, Jang Soo-young, Jun Jae-youn, Kim Min-jung, Kim Moon-hi, Lee Hyo-jung, Lee Kyung-won, Lee Yun-hwa	Japan; Players: Aki Akao, Yu Hirayama, Eriko Hirose, Kaori Imabeppu; Miyuki Maeda, Tomomi Matsuda; Kaori Mori, Kumiko Ogura; Reiko Shiota, Satoko Suetsuna
18 February	Thomas & Uber Cups Preliminaries Asia Zone: Host: Ho Chi Minh City, Vietnam; Level: Continental Team Championships; Format: 14MT/11WT (Round robin)	Score: 3–1	
18 February	Austrian International: Host: Vienna, Austria; Level: International Series; Format: 32MS/32WS/32MD/16WD/32XD	(India) Anand Pawar	(Ukraine) Vladislav Druzchenko
18 February	Austrian International: Host: Vienna, Austria; Level: International Series; Format: 32MS/32WS/32MD/16WD/32XD	Score: 21–16, 21–15	
18 February	Austrian International: Host: Vienna, Austria; Level: International Series; Format: 32MS/32WS/32MD/16WD/32XD	(China) Zhang Xi	(Finland) Anu Nieminen
18 February	Austrian International: Host: Vienna, Austria; Level: International Series; Format: 32MS/32WS/32MD/16WD/32XD	Score: 19–21, 21–13, 21–9	
18 February	Austrian International: Host: Vienna, Austria; Level: International Series; Format: 32MS/32WS/32MD/16WD/32XD	(Indonesia) Fran Kurniawan (Indonesia) Rendra Wijaya	(Belgium) Wouter Claes (Belgium) Frédéric Mawet
18 February	Austrian International: Host: Vienna, Austria; Level: International Series; Format: 32MS/32WS/32MD/16WD/32XD	Score: 21–14, 21–11	
18 February	Austrian International: Host: Vienna, Austria; Level: International Series; Format: 32MS/32WS/32MD/16WD/32XD	(China) Cai Jiani (China) Yu Qi	(Russia) Olga Golovanova (Russia) Anastasia Prokopenko
18 February	Austrian International: Host: Vienna, Austria; Level: International Series; Format: 32MS/32WS/32MD/16WD/32XD	Score: 21–16, 21–8	
18 February	Austrian International: Host: Vienna, Austria; Level: International Series; Format: 32MS/32WS/32MD/16WD/32XD	(China) Zhang Yi (China) Cai Jiani	(Belgium) Wouter Claes (Belgium) Nathalie Descamps
18 February	Austrian International: Host: Vienna, Austria; Level: International Series; Format: 32MS/32WS/32MD/16WD/32XD	Score: 21–18, 21–18	
18 February	Mauritius International: Host: Rose Hill, Mauritius; Level: Future Series; Format: 64MS/32WS/32MD/16WD/32XD	(Uganda) Edwin Ekiring	(Spain) Carlos Longo
18 February	Mauritius International: Host: Rose Hill, Mauritius; Level: Future Series; Format: 64MS/32WS/32MD/16WD/32XD	Score: 21–15, 15–21, 21–8	
18 February	Mauritius International: Host: Rose Hill, Mauritius; Level: Future Series; Format: 64MS/32WS/32MD/16WD/32XD	(Nigeria) Grace Daniel	(Spain) Yoana Martínez
18 February	Mauritius International: Host: Rose Hill, Mauritius; Level: Future Series; Format: 64MS/32WS/32MD/16WD/32XD	Score: 21–15, 21–18	
18 February	Mauritius International: Host: Rose Hill, Mauritius; Level: Future Series; Format: 64MS/32WS/32MD/16WD/32XD	(Nigeria) Jinkan Ifraimu (Nigeria) Ola Fagbemi	(Nigeria) Greg Orobosa Okuonghae (Nigeria) Ibrahim Adamu
18 February	Mauritius International: Host: Rose Hill, Mauritius; Level: Future Series; Format: 64MS/32WS/32MD/16WD/32XD	Score: 21–15, 21–17	
18 February	Mauritius International: Host: Rose Hill, Mauritius; Level: Future Series; Format: 64MS/32WS/32MD/16WD/32XD	(South Africa) Chantal Botts (South Africa) Michelle Edwards	(South Africa) Kerry-Lee Harrington (South Africa) Stacey Doubell
18 February	Mauritius International: Host: Rose Hill, Mauritius; Level: Future Series; Format: 64MS/32WS/32MD/16WD/32XD	Score: 21–7, 17–21, 21–14	
18 February	Mauritius International: Host: Rose Hill, Mauritius; Level: Future Series; Format: 64MS/32WS/32MD/16WD/32XD	(South Africa) Dorian James (South Africa) Michelle Edwards	(South Africa) Chris Dednam (South Africa) Annari Viljoen
18 February	Mauritius International: Host: Rose Hill, Mauritius; Level: Future Series; Format: 64MS/32WS/32MD/16WD/32XD	Score: 21–16, 15–21, 21–11	
25 February	German Open: Host: Mülheim, Germany; Level: Grand Prix; Format: 64MS/32WS/32MD/32WD/32XD	(South Korea) Lee Hyun-il	(Japan) Sho Sasaki
25 February	German Open: Host: Mülheim, Germany; Level: Grand Prix; Format: 64MS/32WS/32MD/32WD/32XD	Score: 22–20, 21–5	
25 February	German Open: Host: Mülheim, Germany; Level: Grand Prix; Format: 64MS/32WS/32MD/32WD/32XD	(South Korea) Jun Jae-youn	(China) Wang Yihan
25 February	German Open: Host: Mülheim, Germany; Level: Grand Prix; Format: 64MS/32WS/32MD/32WD/32XD	Score: 25–23, 21–10	
25 February	German Open: Host: Mülheim, Germany; Level: Grand Prix; Format: 64MS/32WS/32MD/32WD/32XD	(South Korea) Lee Jae-jin (South Korea) Hwang Ji-man	(South Korea) Jung Jae-sung (South Korea) Lee Yong-dae
25 February	German Open: Host: Mülheim, Germany; Level: Grand Prix; Format: 64MS/32WS/32MD/32WD/32XD	Score: 21–13, 21–19	
25 February	German Open: Host: Mülheim, Germany; Level: Grand Prix; Format: 64MS/32WS/32MD/32WD/32XD	(South Korea) Lee Kyung-won (South Korea) Lee Hyo-jung	(Japan) Miyuki Maeda (Japan) Satoko Suetsuna
25 February	German Open: Host: Mülheim, Germany; Level: Grand Prix; Format: 64MS/32WS/32MD/32WD/32XD	Score: 21–17, 21–16	
25 February	German Open: Host: Mülheim, Germany; Level: Grand Prix; Format: 64MS/32WS/32MD/32WD/32XD	(South Korea) Lee Yong-dae (South Korea) Lee Hyo-jung	(China) He Hanbin (China) Yu Yang
25 February	German Open: Host: Mülheim, Germany; Level: Grand Prix; Format: 64MS/32WS/32MD/32WD/32XD	Score: 9–21, 27–25, 21–18	

=== March ===
Week of	Tournament	Champions	Runners-up
3 March	All England Open (Draw): Host: Birmingham, England; Level: Superseries; Format: 32MS/32WS/32MD/32WD/32XD	(China) Chen Jin	(China) Lin Dan
3 March	All England Open (Draw): Host: Birmingham, England; Level: Superseries; Format: 32MS/32WS/32MD/32WD/32XD	Score: 22–20, 25–23	
3 March	All England Open (Draw): Host: Birmingham, England; Level: Superseries; Format: 32MS/32WS/32MD/32WD/32XD	(Denmark) Tine Rasmussen	(China) Lu Lan
3 March	All England Open (Draw): Host: Birmingham, England; Level: Superseries; Format: 32MS/32WS/32MD/32WD/32XD	Score: 21–11, 18–21, 22–20	
3 March	All England Open (Draw): Host: Birmingham, England; Level: Superseries; Format: 32MS/32WS/32MD/32WD/32XD	(South Korea) Jung Jae-sung (South Korea) Lee Yong-dae	(South Korea) Lee Jae-jin (South Korea) Hwang Ji-man
3 March	All England Open (Draw): Host: Birmingham, England; Level: Superseries; Format: 32MS/32WS/32MD/32WD/32XD	Score: 20–22, 21–19, 21–18	
3 March	All England Open (Draw): Host: Birmingham, England; Level: Superseries; Format: 32MS/32WS/32MD/32WD/32XD	(South Korea) Lee Kyung-won (South Korea) Lee Hyo-jung	(China) Du Jing (China) Yu Yang
3 March	All England Open (Draw): Host: Birmingham, England; Level: Superseries; Format: 32MS/32WS/32MD/32WD/32XD	Score: 12–21, 21–18, 21–14	
3 March	All England Open (Draw): Host: Birmingham, England; Level: Superseries; Format: 32MS/32WS/32MD/32WD/32XD	(China) Zheng Bo (China) Gao Ling	(Indonesia) Nova Widianto (Indonesia) Liliyana Natsir
3 March	All England Open (Draw): Host: Birmingham, England; Level: Superseries; Format: 32MS/32WS/32MD/32WD/32XD	Score: 18–21, 21–14, 21–9	
3 March	Croatian International: Host: Zagreb, Croatia; Level: International Series; Format: 32MS/32WS/32MD/16WD/32XD	(Finland) Ville Lång	(France) Erwin Kehlhoffner
3 March	Croatian International: Host: Zagreb, Croatia; Level: International Series; Format: 32MS/32WS/32MD/16WD/32XD	Score: 21–17, 21–6	
3 March	Croatian International: Host: Zagreb, Croatia; Level: International Series; Format: 32MS/32WS/32MD/16WD/32XD	(Japan) Kaori Imabeppu	(Denmark) Nanna Brosolat Jensen
3 March	Croatian International: Host: Zagreb, Croatia; Level: International Series; Format: 32MS/32WS/32MD/16WD/32XD	Score: 21–11, 21–17	
3 March	Croatian International: Host: Zagreb, Croatia; Level: International Series; Format: 32MS/32WS/32MD/16WD/32XD	(India) K. T. Rupesh Kumar (India) Sanave Thomas	(Czech Republic) Jakub Bitman (Croatia) Zvonimir Đurkinjak
3 March	Croatian International: Host: Zagreb, Croatia; Level: International Series; Format: 32MS/32WS/32MD/16WD/32XD	Score: 21–9, 21–14	
3 March	Croatian International: Host: Zagreb, Croatia; Level: International Series; Format: 32MS/32WS/32MD/16WD/32XD	(Denmark) Maria Thorberg (Estonia) Kati Tolmoff	(Russia) Tatyana Bibik (Russia) Olga Golovanova
3 March	Croatian International: Host: Zagreb, Croatia; Level: International Series; Format: 32MS/32WS/32MD/16WD/32XD	Score: 24–22, 21–15	
3 March	Croatian International: Host: Zagreb, Croatia; Level: International Series; Format: 32MS/32WS/32MD/16WD/32XD	(France) Baptiste Carême (France) Laura Choinet	(Bulgaria) Vladimir Metodiev (Bulgaria) Gabriela Banova
3 March	Croatian International: Host: Zagreb, Croatia; Level: International Series; Format: 32MS/32WS/32MD/16WD/32XD	Score: 21–11, 21–15	
10 March	Swiss Open (Draw): Host: Basel, Switzerland; Level: Superseries; Format: 32MS/32WS/32MD/32WD/32XD	(China) Lin Dan	(Malaysia) Lee Chong Wei
10 March	Swiss Open (Draw): Host: Basel, Switzerland; Level: Superseries; Format: 32MS/32WS/32MD/32WD/32XD	Score: 21–13, 21–18	
10 March	Swiss Open (Draw): Host: Basel, Switzerland; Level: Superseries; Format: 32MS/32WS/32MD/32WD/32XD	(China) Xie Xingfang	(China) Zhang Ning
10 March	Swiss Open (Draw): Host: Basel, Switzerland; Level: Superseries; Format: 32MS/32WS/32MD/32WD/32XD	Score: 21–18, 21–17	
10 March	Swiss Open (Draw): Host: Basel, Switzerland; Level: Superseries; Format: 32MS/32WS/32MD/32WD/32XD	(South Korea) Jung Jae-sung (South Korea) Lee Yong-dae	(Indonesia) Markis Kido (Indonesia) Hendra Setiawan
10 March	Swiss Open (Draw): Host: Basel, Switzerland; Level: Superseries; Format: 32MS/32WS/32MD/32WD/32XD	Score: 17–21, 21–16, 21–13	
10 March	Swiss Open (Draw): Host: Basel, Switzerland; Level: Superseries; Format: 32MS/32WS/32MD/32WD/32XD	(China) Yang Wei (China) Zhang Jiewen	(China) Wei Yili (China) Zhang Yawen
10 March	Swiss Open (Draw): Host: Basel, Switzerland; Level: Superseries; Format: 32MS/32WS/32MD/32WD/32XD	Score: 21–18, 22–24, 21–8	
10 March	Swiss Open (Draw): Host: Basel, Switzerland; Level: Superseries; Format: 32MS/32WS/32MD/32WD/32XD	(China) He Hanbin (China) Yu Yang	(England) Anthony Clark (England) Donna Kellogg
10 March	Swiss Open (Draw): Host: Basel, Switzerland; Level: Superseries; Format: 32MS/32WS/32MD/32WD/32XD	Score: 21–15, 21–9	
10 March	Portugal International: Host: Caldas da Rainha, Portugal; Level: International Series; Format: 32MS/32WS/32MD/16WD/32XD	(India) Anand Pawar	(England) Carl Baxter
10 March	Portugal International: Host: Caldas da Rainha, Portugal; Level: International Series; Format: 32MS/32WS/32MD/16WD/32XD	Score: 21–15, 21–8	
10 March	Portugal International: Host: Caldas da Rainha, Portugal; Level: International Series; Format: 32MS/32WS/32MD/16WD/32XD	(Japan) Kaori Imabeppu	(China) Zhang Xi
10 March	Portugal International: Host: Caldas da Rainha, Portugal; Level: International Series; Format: 32MS/32WS/32MD/16WD/32XD	Score: 21–13, 21–15	
10 March	Portugal International: Host: Caldas da Rainha, Portugal; Level: International Series; Format: 32MS/32WS/32MD/16WD/32XD	(Netherlands) Ruud Bosch (Netherlands) Koen Ridder	(India) K. T. Rupesh Kumar (India) Sanave Thomas
10 March	Portugal International: Host: Caldas da Rainha, Portugal; Level: International Series; Format: 32MS/32WS/32MD/16WD/32XD	Score: 21–19, 22–20	
10 March	Portugal International: Host: Caldas da Rainha, Portugal; Level: International Series; Format: 32MS/32WS/32MD/16WD/32XD	(China) Cai Jiani (China) Zhang Xi	(England) Mariana Agathangelou (England) Gabrielle White
10 March	Portugal International: Host: Caldas da Rainha, Portugal; Level: International Series; Format: 32MS/32WS/32MD/16WD/32XD	Score: 21–17, 21–14	
10 March	Portugal International: Host: Caldas da Rainha, Portugal; Level: International Series; Format: 32MS/32WS/32MD/16WD/32XD	(China) Zhang Yi (China) Cai Jiani	(England) Chris Adcock (England) Gabrielle White
10 March	Portugal International: Host: Caldas da Rainha, Portugal; Level: International Series; Format: 32MS/32WS/32MD/16WD/32XD	Score: 21–14, 21–11	
17 March	Banuinvest International: Host: Timișoara, Romania; Level: International Series; Format: 32MS/32WS/32MD/16WD/32XD	(Finland) Ville Lång	(Estonia) Raul Must
17 March	Banuinvest International: Host: Timișoara, Romania; Level: International Series; Format: 32MS/32WS/32MD/16WD/32XD	Score: 21–17, 21–18	
17 March	Banuinvest International: Host: Timișoara, Romania; Level: International Series; Format: 32MS/32WS/32MD/16WD/32XD	(South Korea) Hwang Hye-youn	(Russia) Olga Golovanova
17 March	Banuinvest International: Host: Timișoara, Romania; Level: International Series; Format: 32MS/32WS/32MD/16WD/32XD	Score: 21–13, 21–7	
17 March	Banuinvest International: Host: Timișoara, Romania; Level: International Series; Format: 32MS/32WS/32MD/16WD/32XD	(Bulgaria) Vladimir Metodiev (Bulgaria) Krasimir Yankov	(Poland) Łukasz Moreń (Poland) Michał Rogalski
17 March	Banuinvest International: Host: Timișoara, Romania; Level: International Series; Format: 32MS/32WS/32MD/16WD/32XD	Score: 21–17, 14–21, 21–15	
17 March	Banuinvest International: Host: Timișoara, Romania; Level: International Series; Format: 32MS/32WS/32MD/16WD/32XD	(Russia) Olga Golovanova (Russia) Anastasia Prokopenko	(United States) Eva Lee (United States) Mesinee Mangkalakiri
17 March	Banuinvest International: Host: Timișoara, Romania; Level: International Series; Format: 32MS/32WS/32MD/16WD/32XD	Score: 21–18, 21–15	
17 March	Banuinvest International: Host: Timișoara, Romania; Level: International Series; Format: 32MS/32WS/32MD/16WD/32XD	(Bulgaria) Stilian Makarski (Bulgaria) Diana Dimova	(Poland) Łukasz Moreń (Poland) Małgorzata Kurdelska
17 March	Banuinvest International: Host: Timișoara, Romania; Level: International Series; Format: 32MS/32WS/32MD/16WD/32XD	Score: 21–15, 10–21, 21–18	
24 March	Giraldilla International: Host: La Havana, Cuba; Level: Future Series; Format: 32MS/32WS/16MD/8WD/16XD	(Belgium) Yuhan Tan	(United States) Raju Rai
24 March	Giraldilla International: Host: La Havana, Cuba; Level: Future Series; Format: 32MS/32WS/16MD/8WD/16XD	Score: 21–19, 21–19	
24 March	Giraldilla International: Host: La Havana, Cuba; Level: Future Series; Format: 32MS/32WS/16MD/8WD/16XD	(Cuba) Solángel Guzmán	(United States) Lauren Todt
24 March	Giraldilla International: Host: La Havana, Cuba; Level: Future Series; Format: 32MS/32WS/16MD/8WD/16XD	Score: 21–10, 21–12	
24 March	Giraldilla International: Host: La Havana, Cuba; Level: Future Series; Format: 32MS/32WS/16MD/8WD/16XD	(Cuba) Alexander Hernández (Cuba) Osleni Guerrero	(Cuba) Peteiro Yendri (Cuba) Ronald Toledo
24 March	Giraldilla International: Host: La Havana, Cuba; Level: Future Series; Format: 32MS/32WS/16MD/8WD/16XD	Score: 21–18, 21–17	
24 March	Giraldilla International: Host: La Havana, Cuba; Level: Future Series; Format: 32MS/32WS/16MD/8WD/16XD	(Cuba) Maria Hernández (Cuba) Solángel Guzmán	(Cuba) Keylin Jimenez (Cuba) Lisandra Suárez
24 March	Giraldilla International: Host: La Havana, Cuba; Level: Future Series; Format: 32MS/32WS/16MD/8WD/16XD	Score: 21–12, 21–9	
24 March	Giraldilla International: Host: La Havana, Cuba; Level: Future Series; Format: 32MS/32WS/16MD/8WD/16XD	(Cuba) Osleni Guerrero (Cuba) Lisandra Suárez	(Cuba) Alexander Hernandez (Cuba) Solángel Guzmán
24 March	Giraldilla International: Host: La Havana, Cuba; Level: Future Series; Format: 32MS/32WS/16MD/8WD/16XD	Score: 21–17, 21–17	
24 March	Polish International: Host: Warsaw, Poland; Level: International Challenge; Format: 32MS/32WS/32MD/32WD/32XD	(Germany) Marc Zwiebler	(Finland) Ville Lång
24 March	Polish International: Host: Warsaw, Poland; Level: International Challenge; Format: 32MS/32WS/32MD/32WD/32XD	Score: 21–15, 21–13	
24 March	Polish International: Host: Warsaw, Poland; Level: International Challenge; Format: 32MS/32WS/32MD/32WD/32XD	(Germany) Juliane Schenk	(Bulgaria) Petya Nedelcheva
24 March	Polish International: Host: Warsaw, Poland; Level: International Challenge; Format: 32MS/32WS/32MD/32WD/32XD	Score: 21–16, 21–7	
24 March	Polish International: Host: Warsaw, Poland; Level: International Challenge; Format: 32MS/32WS/32MD/32WD/32XD	(Poland) Michał Łogosz (Poland) Robert Mateusiak	(Poland) Adam Cwalina (Poland) Wojciech Szkudlarczyk
24 March	Polish International: Host: Warsaw, Poland; Level: International Challenge; Format: 32MS/32WS/32MD/32WD/32XD	Score: 21–16, 21–5	
24 March	Polish International: Host: Warsaw, Poland; Level: International Challenge; Format: 32MS/32WS/32MD/32WD/32XD	(Indonesia) Shendy Puspa Irawati (Indonesia) Meiliana Jauhari	(Sweden) Elin Bergblom (Sweden) Johanna Persson
24 March	Polish International: Host: Warsaw, Poland; Level: International Challenge; Format: 32MS/32WS/32MD/32WD/32XD	Score: 21–11, 21–19	
24 March	Polish International: Host: Warsaw, Poland; Level: International Challenge; Format: 32MS/32WS/32MD/32WD/32XD	(Poland) Robert Mateusiak (Poland) Nadieżda Kostiuczyk	(Indonesia) Fran Kurniawan (Indonesia) Shendy Puspa Irawati
24 March	Polish International: Host: Warsaw, Poland; Level: International Challenge; Format: 32MS/32WS/32MD/32WD/32XD	Score: 21–14, 21–13	
24 March	Kenya International: Host: Nairobi, Kenya; Level: Future Series; Format: 64MS/16WS/16MD/16XD	(India) Chetan Anand	(Spain) José Antonio Crespo
24 March	Kenya International: Host: Nairobi, Kenya; Level: Future Series; Format: 64MS/16WS/16MD/16XD	Score: 21–14, 21–7	
24 March	Kenya International: Host: Nairobi, Kenya; Level: Future Series; Format: 64MS/16WS/16MD/16XD	(Portugal) Ana Moura	(Spain) Yoana Martínez
24 March	Kenya International: Host: Nairobi, Kenya; Level: Future Series; Format: 64MS/16WS/16MD/16XD	Score: 19–21, 21–14, 21–19	
24 March	Kenya International: Host: Nairobi, Kenya; Level: Future Series; Format: 64MS/16WS/16MD/16XD	(Seychelles) Georgie Cupidon (Seychelles) Steve Malcouzane	(Kenya) Himesh Patel (Kenya) Patrick Ruto
24 March	Kenya International: Host: Nairobi, Kenya; Level: Future Series; Format: 64MS/16WS/16MD/16XD	Score: 21–11, 21–19	
24 March	Kenya International: Host: Nairobi, Kenya; Level: Future Series; Format: 64MS/16WS/16MD/16XD	(South Africa) Michelle Edwards (South Africa) Chantal Botts	
24 March	Kenya International: Host: Nairobi, Kenya; Level: Future Series; Format: 64MS/16WS/16MD/16XD	Score: 21–14, 21–8	
24 March	Kenya International: Host: Nairobi, Kenya; Level: Future Series; Format: 64MS/16WS/16MD/16XD	(Nigeria) Greg Okuonghae (Nigeria) Grace Daniel	(Uganda) Wilson Tukire (Uganda) Mega Nankabirwa
24 March	Kenya International: Host: Nairobi, Kenya; Level: Future Series; Format: 64MS/16WS/16MD/16XD	Score: 21–8, 21–17	

=== April ===
Week of	Tournament	Champions	Runners-up
1 April	India Open: Host: Hyderabad, India; Level: Grand Prix Gold; Format: 64MS/32WS/32MD/32WD/32XD	(Thailand) Boonsak Ponsana	(India) Chetan Anand
1 April	India Open: Host: Hyderabad, India; Level: Grand Prix Gold; Format: 64MS/32WS/32MD/32WD/32XD	Score: 21–16, 21–12	
1 April	India Open: Host: Hyderabad, India; Level: Grand Prix Gold; Format: 64MS/32WS/32MD/32WD/32XD	(Hong Kong) Zhou Mi	(China) Lu Lan
1 April	India Open: Host: Hyderabad, India; Level: Grand Prix Gold; Format: 64MS/32WS/32MD/32WD/32XD	Score: 21–14, 21–14	
1 April	India Open: Host: Hyderabad, India; Level: Grand Prix Gold; Format: 64MS/32WS/32MD/32WD/32XD	(China) Guo Zhendong (China) Xie Zhongbo	(Malaysia) Chan Chong Ming (Malaysia) Chew Choon Eng
1 April	India Open: Host: Hyderabad, India; Level: Grand Prix Gold; Format: 64MS/32WS/32MD/32WD/32XD	Score: 19–21, 21–14, 21–12	
1 April	India Open: Host: Hyderabad, India; Level: Grand Prix Gold; Format: 64MS/32WS/32MD/32WD/32XD	(Chinese Taipei) Chien Yu-chin (Chinese Taipei) Cheng Wen-hsing	(Japan) Miyuki Maeda (Japan) Satoko Suetsuna
1 April	India Open: Host: Hyderabad, India; Level: Grand Prix Gold; Format: 64MS/32WS/32MD/32WD/32XD	Score: 21–17, 21–16	
1 April	India Open: Host: Hyderabad, India; Level: Grand Prix Gold; Format: 64MS/32WS/32MD/32WD/32XD	(China) He Hanbin (China) Yu Yang	(Germany) Kristof Hopp (Germany) Birgit Overzier
1 April	India Open: Host: Hyderabad, India; Level: Grand Prix Gold; Format: 64MS/32WS/32MD/32WD/32XD	Score: 21–18, 21–9	
1 April	Osaka International: Host: Osaka, Japan; Level: International Challenge; Format: 32MS/32WS/32MD/32WD/32XD	(Japan) Koichi Saeki	(Thailand) Tanongsak Saensomboonsuk
1 April	Osaka International: Host: Osaka, Japan; Level: International Challenge; Format: 32MS/32WS/32MD/32WD/32XD	Score: 21–13, 21–12	
1 April	Osaka International: Host: Osaka, Japan; Level: International Challenge; Format: 32MS/32WS/32MD/32WD/32XD	(Japan) Megumi Taruno	(Japan) Mayu Sekiya
1 April	Osaka International: Host: Osaka, Japan; Level: International Challenge; Format: 32MS/32WS/32MD/32WD/32XD	Score: 21–16, 21–5	
1 April	Osaka International: Host: Osaka, Japan; Level: International Challenge; Format: 32MS/32WS/32MD/32WD/32XD	(South Korea) Kwon Yi-goo (South Korea) Ko Sung-hyun	(Japan) Keishi Kawaguchi (Japan) Naoki Kawamae
1 April	Osaka International: Host: Osaka, Japan; Level: International Challenge; Format: 32MS/32WS/32MD/32WD/32XD	Score: 21–11, 21–16	
1 April	Osaka International: Host: Osaka, Japan; Level: International Challenge; Format: 32MS/32WS/32MD/32WD/32XD	(Japan) Kumiko Ogura (Japan) Reiko Shiota	(South Korea) Ha Jung-eun (South Korea) Kim Min-jung
1 April	Osaka International: Host: Osaka, Japan; Level: International Challenge; Format: 32MS/32WS/32MD/32WD/32XD	Score: 20–22, 21–8, 21–13	
1 April	Osaka International: Host: Osaka, Japan; Level: International Challenge; Format: 32MS/32WS/32MD/32WD/32XD	(South Korea) Kwon Yi-goo (South Korea) Ha Jung-eun	(Japan) Noriyasu Hirata (Japan) Shizuka Matsuo
1 April	Osaka International: Host: Osaka, Japan; Level: International Challenge; Format: 32MS/32WS/32MD/32WD/32XD	Score: 24–22, 21–13	
1 April	Finnish International: Host: Helsinki, Finland; Level: International Challenge; Format: 32MS/32WS/32MD/32WD/32XD	(Denmark) Martin Bille Larsen	(England) Carl Baxter
1 April	Finnish International: Host: Helsinki, Finland; Level: International Challenge; Format: 32MS/32WS/32MD/32WD/32XD	Score: 21–18, 7–21, 21–19	
1 April	Finnish International: Host: Helsinki, Finland; Level: International Challenge; Format: 32MS/32WS/32MD/32WD/32XD	(England) Elizabeth Cann	(Sweden) Sara Persson
1 April	Finnish International: Host: Helsinki, Finland; Level: International Challenge; Format: 32MS/32WS/32MD/32WD/32XD	Score: 21–12, 21–17	
1 April	Finnish International: Host: Helsinki, Finland; Level: International Challenge; Format: 32MS/32WS/32MD/32WD/32XD	(Indonesia) Fran Kurniawan (Indonesia) Rendra Wijaya	(Denmark) Jacob Chemnitz (Denmark) Mikkel Delbo Larsen
1 April	Finnish International: Host: Helsinki, Finland; Level: International Challenge; Format: 32MS/32WS/32MD/32WD/32XD	Score: 21–19, 11–21, 21–14	
1 April	Finnish International: Host: Helsinki, Finland; Level: International Challenge; Format: 32MS/32WS/32MD/32WD/32XD	(Denmark) Lena Frier Kristiansen (Denmark) Kamilla Rytter Juhl	(Russia) Ekaterina Ananina (Russia) Anastasia Russkikh
1 April	Finnish International: Host: Helsinki, Finland; Level: International Challenge; Format: 32MS/32WS/32MD/32WD/32XD	Score: 21–17, 21–15	
1 April	Finnish International: Host: Helsinki, Finland; Level: International Challenge; Format: 32MS/32WS/32MD/32WD/32XD	(Indonesia) Fran Kurniawan (Indonesia) Shendy Puspa Irawati	(Denmark) Mads Pieler Kolding (Denmark) Line Damkjær Kruse
1 April	Finnish International: Host: Helsinki, Finland; Level: International Challenge; Format: 32MS/32WS/32MD/32WD/32XD	Score: 21–12, 21–18	
7 April	Peru International: Host: Lima, Peru; Level: Future Series; Format: 64MS/64WS/16MD/16WD/32XD	(Guatemala) Kevin Cordón	(Peru) Andrés Corpancho
7 April	Peru International: Host: Lima, Peru; Level: Future Series; Format: 64MS/64WS/16MD/16WD/32XD	Score: 21–14, 21–14	
7 April	Peru International: Host: Lima, Peru; Level: Future Series; Format: 64MS/64WS/16MD/16WD/32XD	(Peru) Claudia Rivero	(Spain) Lucía Tavera
7 April	Peru International: Host: Lima, Peru; Level: Future Series; Format: 64MS/64WS/16MD/16WD/32XD	Score: 21–8, 21–14	
7 April	Peru International: Host: Lima, Peru; Level: Future Series; Format: 64MS/64WS/16MD/16WD/32XD	(Peru) Francisco Ugaz (Spain) José Antonio Crespo	(Peru) Andrés Corpancho (Peru) Rodrigo Pacheco
7 April	Peru International: Host: Lima, Peru; Level: Future Series; Format: 64MS/64WS/16MD/16WD/32XD	Score: 21–15, 21–15	
7 April	Peru International: Host: Lima, Peru; Level: Future Series; Format: 64MS/64WS/16MD/16WD/32XD	(Australia) Eugenia Tanaka (Australia) Tania Luiz	(Australia) Erin Carroll (Australia) Leisha Cooper
7 April	Peru International: Host: Lima, Peru; Level: Future Series; Format: 64MS/64WS/16MD/16WD/32XD	Score: 21–23, 21–17, 21–13	
7 April	Peru International: Host: Lima, Peru; Level: Future Series; Format: 64MS/64WS/16MD/16WD/32XD	(Peru) Andrés Corpancho (Peru) Cristina Aicardi	(Peru) Martín del Valle (Peru) Daniela Cuba
7 April	Peru International: Host: Lima, Peru; Level: Future Series; Format: 64MS/64WS/16MD/16WD/32XD	Score: 15–21, 21–15, 21–18	
7 April	European Championships (Draw): Host: Herning, Denmark; Level: Continental Team Championships; Format: 16XT (Round robin) 64MS/64WS/64MD/64WD/64XD	Denmark	England
7 April	European Championships (Draw): Host: Herning, Denmark; Level: Continental Team Championships; Format: 16XT (Round robin) 64MS/64WS/64MD/64WD/64XD	Score: 3–0	
7 April	European Championships (Draw): Host: Herning, Denmark; Level: Continental Team Championships; Format: 16XT (Round robin) 64MS/64WS/64MD/64WD/64XD	(Denmark) Kenneth Jonassen	(Denmark) Joachim Persson
7 April	European Championships (Draw): Host: Herning, Denmark; Level: Continental Team Championships; Format: 16XT (Round robin) 64MS/64WS/64MD/64WD/64XD	Score: 21–13, 21–16	
7 April	European Championships (Draw): Host: Herning, Denmark; Level: Continental Team Championships; Format: 16XT (Round robin) 64MS/64WS/64MD/64WD/64XD	(Germany) Xu Huaiwen	(Denmark) Tine Rasmussen
7 April	European Championships (Draw): Host: Herning, Denmark; Level: Continental Team Championships; Format: 16XT (Round robin) 64MS/64WS/64MD/64WD/64XD	Score: 12–21, 21–12, 21–17	
7 April	European Championships (Draw): Host: Herning, Denmark; Level: Continental Team Championships; Format: 16XT (Round robin) 64MS/64WS/64MD/64WD/64XD	(Denmark) Lars Paaske (Denmark) Jonas Rasmussen	(Denmark) Jens Eriksen (Denmark) Martin Lundgaard Hansen
7 April	European Championships (Draw): Host: Herning, Denmark; Level: Continental Team Championships; Format: 16XT (Round robin) 64MS/64WS/64MD/64WD/64XD	Score: 21–19, 21–16	
7 April	European Championships (Draw): Host: Herning, Denmark; Level: Continental Team Championships; Format: 16XT (Round robin) 64MS/64WS/64MD/64WD/64XD	(Denmark) Kamilla Rytter Juhl (Denmark) Lena Frier Kristiansen	(England) Donna Kellogg (England) Gail Emms
7 April	European Championships (Draw): Host: Herning, Denmark; Level: Continental Team Championships; Format: 16XT (Round robin) 64MS/64WS/64MD/64WD/64XD	Score: 21–18, 21–18	
7 April	European Championships (Draw): Host: Herning, Denmark; Level: Continental Team Championships; Format: 16XT (Round robin) 64MS/64WS/64MD/64WD/64XD	(England) Anthony Clark (England) Donna Kellogg	(Poland) Robert Mateusiak (Poland) Nadieżda Kostiuczyk
7 April	European Championships (Draw): Host: Herning, Denmark; Level: Continental Team Championships; Format: 16XT (Round robin) 64MS/64WS/64MD/64WD/64XD	Score: 16–21, 22–20, 21–15	
14 April	Asian Championships (Draw): Host: Johor Bahru, Malaysia; Level: Continental Championships; Format: 64MS/32WS/32MD/32WD/32XD	(South Korea) Park Sung-hwan	(China) Chen Jin
14 April	Asian Championships (Draw): Host: Johor Bahru, Malaysia; Level: Continental Championships; Format: 64MS/32WS/32MD/32WD/32XD	Score: 21–18, 21–18	
14 April	Asian Championships (Draw): Host: Johor Bahru, Malaysia; Level: Continental Championships; Format: 64MS/32WS/32MD/32WD/32XD	(China) Jiang Yanjiao	(China) Wang Lin
14 April	Asian Championships (Draw): Host: Johor Bahru, Malaysia; Level: Continental Championships; Format: 64MS/32WS/32MD/32WD/32XD	Score: 18–21, 21–18, 21–13	
14 April	Asian Championships (Draw): Host: Johor Bahru, Malaysia; Level: Continental Championships; Format: 64MS/32WS/32MD/32WD/32XD	(South Korea) Jung Jae-sung (South Korea) Lee Yong-dae	(Indonesia) Candra Wijaya (Indonesia) Nova Widianto
14 April	Asian Championships (Draw): Host: Johor Bahru, Malaysia; Level: Continental Championships; Format: 64MS/32WS/32MD/32WD/32XD	Score: 21–16, 21–16	
14 April	Asian Championships (Draw): Host: Johor Bahru, Malaysia; Level: Continental Championships; Format: 64MS/32WS/32MD/32WD/32XD	(China) Yang Wei (China) Zhang Jiewen	(Chinese Taipei) Cheng Wen-hsing (Chinese Taipei) Chien Yu-chin
14 April	Asian Championships (Draw): Host: Johor Bahru, Malaysia; Level: Continental Championships; Format: 64MS/32WS/32MD/32WD/32XD	Score: 22–20, 21–16	
14 April	Asian Championships (Draw): Host: Johor Bahru, Malaysia; Level: Continental Championships; Format: 64MS/32WS/32MD/32WD/32XD	(Indonesia) Flandy Limpele (Indonesia) Vita Marissa	(Indonesia) Nova Widianto (Indonesia) Liliyana Natsir
14 April	Asian Championships (Draw): Host: Johor Bahru, Malaysia; Level: Continental Championships; Format: 64MS/32WS/32MD/32WD/32XD	Score: 21–17, 21–17	
14 April	Miami Pan Am International: Host: Miami, United States; Level: Future Series; Format: 32MS/16WS/16MD/8WD/16XD	(Guatemala) Kevin Cordón	(Denmark) Christian Lind Thomsen
14 April	Miami Pan Am International: Host: Miami, United States; Level: Future Series; Format: 32MS/16WS/16MD/8WD/16XD	Score: 21–18, 21–10	
14 April	Miami Pan Am International: Host: Miami, United States; Level: Future Series; Format: 32MS/16WS/16MD/8WD/16XD	(Peru) Claudia Rivero	(Peru) Christina Aicardi
14 April	Miami Pan Am International: Host: Miami, United States; Level: Future Series; Format: 32MS/16WS/16MD/8WD/16XD	Score: 21–12, 21–7	
14 April	Miami Pan Am International: Host: Miami, United States; Level: Future Series; Format: 32MS/16WS/16MD/8WD/16XD	(United States) Daniel Gouw (United States) Chandra Kowi	(Spain) José Antonio Crespo (Brazil) Guilherme Pardo
14 April	Miami Pan Am International: Host: Miami, United States; Level: Future Series; Format: 32MS/16WS/16MD/8WD/16XD	Score: 19–21, 21–13, 21–14	
14 April	Miami Pan Am International: Host: Miami, United States; Level: Future Series; Format: 32MS/16WS/16MD/8WD/16XD	(Australia) Eugenia Tanaka (Australia) Tania Luiz	(Peru) Christina Aicardi (Peru) Claudia Rivero
14 April	Miami Pan Am International: Host: Miami, United States; Level: Future Series; Format: 32MS/16WS/16MD/8WD/16XD	Score: 21–13, 21–13	
14 April	Miami Pan Am International: Host: Miami, United States; Level: Future Series; Format: 32MS/16WS/16MD/8WD/16XD	(Peru) Andrés Corpancho (Peru) Cristina Aicardi	(Peru) Martín del Valle (Peru) Katherine Winder
14 April	Miami Pan Am International: Host: Miami, United States; Level: Future Series; Format: 32MS/16WS/16MD/8WD/16XD	Score: 21–14, 18–21, 21–16	
14 April	Nigeria International: Host: Nigeria; Level: International Series; Format: 32MS/32WS/16MD/16XD	(Portugal) Alexandre Paixão	(United States) Raju Rai
14 April	Nigeria International: Host: Nigeria; Level: International Series; Format: 32MS/32WS/16MD/16XD	Score: 21–13, 21–14	
14 April	Nigeria International: Host: Nigeria; Level: International Series; Format: 32MS/32WS/16MD/16XD	(China) Xu Bingxin	(Nigeria) Grace Daniel
14 April	Nigeria International: Host: Nigeria; Level: International Series; Format: 32MS/32WS/16MD/16XD	Score: 21–17, 9–21, 21–6	
14 April	Nigeria International: Host: Nigeria; Level: International Series; Format: 32MS/32WS/16MD/16XD	(Nigeria) Ola Fagbemi (Nigeria) Jinkan Ifraimu	(Nigeria) Akeem Ogunseye (Nigeria) Greg Okuonghae
14 April	Nigeria International: Host: Nigeria; Level: International Series; Format: 32MS/32WS/16MD/16XD	Score: 24–22, 17–21, 21–17	
14 April	Nigeria International: Host: Nigeria; Level: International Series; Format: 32MS/32WS/16MD/16XD	(Nigeria) Greg Okuonghae (Nigeria) Grace Daniel	(Nigeria) Akeem Ogunseye (Nigeria) Mary Gideon
14 April	Nigeria International: Host: Nigeria; Level: International Series; Format: 32MS/32WS/16MD/16XD	Score: 21–13, 21–13	
21 April	Canadian International: Host: Montreal, Quebec, Canada; Level: International Challenge; Format: 64MS/32WS/32MD/32WD/32XD	(Japan) Shoji Sato	(England) Andrew Smith
21 April	Canadian International: Host: Montreal, Quebec, Canada; Level: International Challenge; Format: 64MS/32WS/32MD/32WD/32XD	Score: 21–18, 21–16	
21 April	Canadian International: Host: Montreal, Quebec, Canada; Level: International Challenge; Format: 64MS/32WS/32MD/32WD/32XD	(China) Tai Yi	(China) Shi Jinjin
21 April	Canadian International: Host: Montreal, Quebec, Canada; Level: International Challenge; Format: 64MS/32WS/32MD/32WD/32XD	Score: 21–12, 21–13	
21 April	Canadian International: Host: Montreal, Quebec, Canada; Level: International Challenge; Format: 64MS/32WS/32MD/32WD/32XD	(Japan) Keishi Kawaguchi (Japan) Naoki Kawamae	(United States) Howard Bach (United States) Khan Malaythong
21 April	Canadian International: Host: Montreal, Quebec, Canada; Level: International Challenge; Format: 64MS/32WS/32MD/32WD/32XD	Score: 21–15, 21–15	
21 April	Canadian International: Host: Montreal, Quebec, Canada; Level: International Challenge; Format: 64MS/32WS/32MD/32WD/32XD	(Japan) Reika Kakiiwa (Japan) Mizuki Fujii	(Japan) Aki Akao (Japan) Tomomi Matsuda
21 April	Canadian International: Host: Montreal, Quebec, Canada; Level: International Challenge; Format: 64MS/32WS/32MD/32WD/32XD	Score: 21–15, 21–15	
21 April	Canadian International: Host: Montreal, Quebec, Canada; Level: International Challenge; Format: 64MS/32WS/32MD/32WD/32XD	(Chinese Taipei) Chen Hung-ling (Chinese Taipei) Chou Chia-chi	(China) Zhang Lei (China) Hu Minyu
21 April	Canadian International: Host: Montreal, Quebec, Canada; Level: International Challenge; Format: 64MS/32WS/32MD/32WD/32XD	Score: 21–8, 21–11	
21 April	Laos International: Host: Vientiane, Laos; Level: Future Series; Format: 64MS/16WS/32MD/16WD/16XD	(Indonesia) Hendri Aprilliyanto	(Indonesia) Bayu Sukmo Pamulang
21 April	Laos International: Host: Vientiane, Laos; Level: Future Series; Format: 64MS/16WS/32MD/16WD/16XD	Score: 21–11, 21–19	
21 April	Laos International: Host: Vientiane, Laos; Level: Future Series; Format: 64MS/16WS/32MD/16WD/16XD	(Vietnam) Lê Ngọc Nguyên Nhung	(Thailand) Ratchanok Intanon
21 April	Laos International: Host: Vientiane, Laos; Level: Future Series; Format: 64MS/16WS/32MD/16WD/16XD	Score: 20–22, 21–14, 21–18	
21 April	Laos International: Host: Vientiane, Laos; Level: Future Series; Format: 64MS/16WS/32MD/16WD/16XD	(Indonesia) Afiat Yuris Wirawan (Indonesia) Wifqi Windarto	(Indonesia) Rizky Yanu Kresnayandi (Indonesia) Albert Saputra
21 April	Laos International: Host: Vientiane, Laos; Level: Future Series; Format: 64MS/16WS/32MD/16WD/16XD	Score: 21–12, 21–8	
21 April	Laos International: Host: Vientiane, Laos; Level: Future Series; Format: 64MS/16WS/32MD/16WD/16XD	(Indonesia) Annisa Wahyuni (Indonesia) Nimas Rani Wjayanti	(Vietnam) Lê Ngọc Nguyên Nhung (Vietnam) Thái Thị Hồng Gấm
21 April	Laos International: Host: Vientiane, Laos; Level: Future Series; Format: 64MS/16WS/32MD/16WD/16XD	Score: 17–21, 21–12, 21–19	
21 April	Laos International: Host: Vientiane, Laos; Level: Future Series; Format: 64MS/16WS/32MD/16WD/16XD	(Vietnam) Dương Bảo Đức (Vietnam) Thái Thị Hồng Gấm	(Thailand) Pisit Poodchalat (Thailand) Ratchanok Intanon
21 April	Laos International: Host: Vientiane, Laos; Level: Future Series; Format: 64MS/16WS/32MD/16WD/16XD	Score: 21–16, 18–21, 21–17	
21 April	Dutch International: Host: Wateringen, Netherlands; Level: International Challenge; Format: 32MS/32WS/32MD/16WD/32XD	(Denmark) Hans-Kristian Vittinghus	(China) Wu Yunyong
21 April	Dutch International: Host: Wateringen, Netherlands; Level: International Challenge; Format: 32MS/32WS/32MD/16WD/32XD	Score: 21–12, 21–18	
21 April	Dutch International: Host: Wateringen, Netherlands; Level: International Challenge; Format: 32MS/32WS/32MD/16WD/32XD	(Ukraine) Larisa Griga	(Japan) Yu Wakita
21 April	Dutch International: Host: Wateringen, Netherlands; Level: International Challenge; Format: 32MS/32WS/32MD/16WD/32XD	Score: 21–19, 21–19	
21 April	Dutch International: Host: Wateringen, Netherlands; Level: International Challenge; Format: 32MS/32WS/32MD/16WD/32XD	(Germany) Kristof Hopp (Germany) Ingo Kindervater	(Denmark) Rasmus Bonde (Denmark) Kasper Faust Henriksen
21 April	Dutch International: Host: Wateringen, Netherlands; Level: International Challenge; Format: 32MS/32WS/32MD/16WD/32XD	Score: 13–21, 21–16, 21–18	
21 April	Dutch International: Host: Wateringen, Netherlands; Level: International Challenge; Format: 32MS/32WS/32MD/16WD/32XD	(Poland) Kamila Augustyn (Poland) Nadieżda Kostiuczyk	(Russia) Ekaterina Ananina (Russia) Anastasia Russkikh
21 April	Dutch International: Host: Wateringen, Netherlands; Level: International Challenge; Format: 32MS/32WS/32MD/16WD/32XD	Score: 21–16, 11–21, 21–13	
21 April	Dutch International: Host: Wateringen, Netherlands; Level: International Challenge; Format: 32MS/32WS/32MD/16WD/32XD	(Denmark) Rasmus Bonde (Denmark) Helle Nielsen	(Denmark) Jacob Chemnitz (Denmark) Marie Røpke
21 April	Dutch International: Host: Wateringen, Netherlands; Level: International Challenge; Format: 32MS/32WS/32MD/16WD/32XD	Score: 21–15, 21–12	

=== May ===
Week of	Tournament	Champions	Runners-up
1 May	Smiling Fish International: Host: Trang, Thailand; Level: International Series; Format: 32MS/32WS/32MD/32WD/32XD	(Thailand) Tanongsak Saensomboonsuk	(Thailand) Pakkawat Vilailak
1 May	Smiling Fish International: Host: Trang, Thailand; Level: International Series; Format: 32MS/32WS/32MD/32WD/32XD	Score: 21–18, 21–23, 21–15	
1 May	Smiling Fish International: Host: Trang, Thailand; Level: International Series; Format: 32MS/32WS/32MD/32WD/32XD	(Thailand) Porntip Buranaprasertsuk	(Japan) Megumi Taruno
1 May	Smiling Fish International: Host: Trang, Thailand; Level: International Series; Format: 32MS/32WS/32MD/32WD/32XD	Score: 21–17, 21–23, 21–18	
1 May	Smiling Fish International: Host: Trang, Thailand; Level: International Series; Format: 32MS/32WS/32MD/32WD/32XD	(Indonesia) Fernando Kurniawan (Indonesia) Lingga Lie	(Indonesia) Wifqi Windarto (Indonesia) Afiat Yuris Wirawan
1 May	Smiling Fish International: Host: Trang, Thailand; Level: International Series; Format: 32MS/32WS/32MD/32WD/32XD	Score: 21–16, 21–15	
1 May	Smiling Fish International: Host: Trang, Thailand; Level: International Series; Format: 32MS/32WS/32MD/32WD/32XD	(Japan) Oku Yukina (Japan) Megumi Taruno	(Japan) Ayaka Takahashi (Japan) Koharu Yonemoto
1 May	Smiling Fish International: Host: Trang, Thailand; Level: International Series; Format: 32MS/32WS/32MD/32WD/32XD	Score: 21–15, 22–20	
1 May	Smiling Fish International: Host: Trang, Thailand; Level: International Series; Format: 32MS/32WS/32MD/32WD/32XD	(Indonesia) Lingga Lie (Indonesia) Keshya Nurvita Hanadia	(Indonesia) Viki Indra Okvana (Indonesia) Natalia Christine Poluakan
1 May	Smiling Fish International: Host: Trang, Thailand; Level: International Series; Format: 32MS/32WS/32MD/32WD/32XD	Score: 21–16, 13–21, 21–16	
5 May	World University Championships: Host: Braga, Portugal; Format: 64MS/64WS/64MD/32WD/64XD	(China) Du Pengyu	(Chinese Taipei) Liao Sheng-shiun
5 May	World University Championships: Host: Braga, Portugal; Format: 64MS/64WS/64MD/32WD/64XD	Score: 21–16, 18–21, 21–17	
5 May	World University Championships: Host: Braga, Portugal; Format: 64MS/64WS/64MD/32WD/64XD	(China) Wang Yihan	(South Korea) Kim Mun-hee
5 May	World University Championships: Host: Braga, Portugal; Format: 64MS/64WS/64MD/32WD/64XD	Score: 21–10, 21–7	
5 May	World University Championships: Host: Braga, Portugal; Format: 64MS/64WS/64MD/32WD/64XD	(Indonesia) Mohammad Ahsan (Indonesia) Bona Septano	(South Korea) Han Gi-hoon (South Korea) Han Tae-il
5 May	World University Championships: Host: Braga, Portugal; Format: 64MS/64WS/64MD/32WD/64XD	Score: 21–12, 21–12	
5 May	World University Championships: Host: Braga, Portugal; Format: 64MS/64WS/64MD/32WD/64XD	(Thailand) Duanganong Aroonkesorn (Thailand) Kunchala Voravichitchaikul	(Japan) Yui Nakahara (Japan) Mayu Sekiya
5 May	World University Championships: Host: Braga, Portugal; Format: 64MS/64WS/64MD/32WD/64XD	Score: 21–16, 21–17	
5 May	World University Championships: Host: Braga, Portugal; Format: 64MS/64WS/64MD/32WD/64XD	(Thailand) Patiphat Chalardchalaem (Thailand) Kunchala Voravichitchaikul	(Chinese Taipei) Wang Chia-min (Chinese Taipei) Wang Pei-rong
5 May	World University Championships: Host: Braga, Portugal; Format: 64MS/64WS/64MD/32WD/64XD	Score: 21–16, 22–24, 21–18	
12 May	Thomas and Uber Cup (Draw): Host: Jakarta, Indonesia; Level: World Team Championships; Format: 12MT/12WT (Round robin)	China; Players: Bao Chunlai, Cai Yun, Chen Jin, Chen Yu, Fu Haifeng, Guo Zhendong, He Hanbin, Lin Dan, Shen Ye, Xie Zhongbo	South Korea; Players: Hong Ji-hoon, Hwang Ji-man, Jung Jae-sung, Lee Hyun-il, Lee Jae-jin, Lee Yong-dae, Park Sung-hwan, Shon Seung-mo
12 May	Thomas and Uber Cup (Draw): Host: Jakarta, Indonesia; Level: World Team Championships; Format: 12MT/12WT (Round robin)	Score: 3–1	
12 May	Thomas and Uber Cup (Draw): Host: Jakarta, Indonesia; Level: World Team Championships; Format: 12MT/12WT (Round robin)	China; Players: Gao Ling, Jiang Yanjiao, Lu Lan, Wei Yili, Xie Xingfang, Yang Wei, Zhang Jiewen, Zhang Yawen, Zhao Tingting, Zhu Lin	Indonesia; Players: Adriyanti Firdasari, Maria Kristin Yulianti, Vita Marissa, Rani Mundiasti, Lilyana Natsir, Jo Novita, Endang Nursugianti, Greysia Polii, Fransisca Ratnasari, Pia Zebadiah Bernadet
12 May	Thomas and Uber Cup (Draw): Host: Jakarta, Indonesia; Level: World Team Championships; Format: 12MT/12WT (Round robin)	Score: 3–0	
12 May	Slovenian International: Host: Lendava, Slovenia; Level: International Series; Format: 32MS/32WS/32MD/16WD/32XD	(Czech Republic) Jan Vondra	(Czech Republic) Pavel Florián
12 May	Slovenian International: Host: Lendava, Slovenia; Level: International Series; Format: 32MS/32WS/32MD/16WD/32XD	Score: 21–18, 23–21	
12 May	Slovenian International: Host: Lendava, Slovenia; Level: International Series; Format: 32MS/32WS/32MD/16WD/32XD	(Bulgaria) Linda Zechiri	(Belgium) Lianne Tan
12 May	Slovenian International: Host: Lendava, Slovenia; Level: International Series; Format: 32MS/32WS/32MD/16WD/32XD	Score: 21–15, 21–15	
12 May	Slovenian International: Host: Lendava, Slovenia; Level: International Series; Format: 32MS/32WS/32MD/16WD/32XD	(Austria) Michael Lahnsteiner (Austria) Peter Zauner	(Czech Republic) Ondřej Kopřiva (Czech Republic) Tomáš Kopřiva
12 May	Slovenian International: Host: Lendava, Slovenia; Level: International Series; Format: 32MS/32WS/32MD/16WD/32XD	Score: 21–17, 21–12	
12 May	Slovenian International: Host: Lendava, Slovenia; Level: International Series; Format: 32MS/32WS/32MD/16WD/32XD	(Sweden) Emelie Lennartsson (Sweden) Emma Wengberg	(Germany) Claudia Vogelgsang (Finland) Nina Weckström
12 May	Slovenian International: Host: Lendava, Slovenia; Level: International Series; Format: 32MS/32WS/32MD/16WD/32XD	Score: 21–9, 21–11	
12 May	Slovenian International: Host: Lendava, Slovenia; Level: International Series; Format: 32MS/32WS/32MD/16WD/32XD	(Bulgaria) Vladimir Metodiev (Bulgaria) Gabriela Banova	(Croatia) Zvonimir Đurkinjak (Croatia) Staša Poznanović
12 May	Slovenian International: Host: Lendava, Slovenia; Level: International Series; Format: 32MS/32WS/32MD/16WD/32XD	Score: Walkover	
19 May	Singapore Asian Satellite: Host: Singapore; Level: International Series; Format: 64MS/32WS/32MD/32WD/16XD	(South Korea) Ahn Hyun-suk	(Thailand) Pakkawat Vilailak
19 May	Singapore Asian Satellite: Host: Singapore; Level: International Series; Format: 64MS/32WS/32MD/32WD/16XD	Score: 21–19, 21–15	
19 May	Singapore Asian Satellite: Host: Singapore; Level: International Series; Format: 64MS/32WS/32MD/32WD/16XD	(Thailand) Porntip Buranaprasertsuk	(Indonesia) Yuan Kartika Putri
19 May	Singapore Asian Satellite: Host: Singapore; Level: International Series; Format: 64MS/32WS/32MD/32WD/16XD	Score: 21–18, 16–21, 21–16	
19 May	Singapore Asian Satellite: Host: Singapore; Level: International Series; Format: 64MS/32WS/32MD/32WD/16XD	(Indonesia) Fernando Kurniawan (Indonesia) Lingga Lie	(Singapore) Chayut Triyachart (Singapore) Danny Bawa Chrisnanta
19 May	Singapore Asian Satellite: Host: Singapore; Level: International Series; Format: 64MS/32WS/32MD/32WD/16XD	Score: 21–12, 17–21, 21–19	
19 May	Singapore Asian Satellite: Host: Singapore; Level: International Series; Format: 64MS/32WS/32MD/32WD/16XD	(Singapore) Yao Lei (Singapore) Shinta Mulia Sari	(Indonesia) Nadya Melati (Indonesia) Devi Tika Permatasari
19 May	Singapore Asian Satellite: Host: Singapore; Level: International Series; Format: 64MS/32WS/32MD/32WD/16XD	Score: 14–21, 21–14, 21–13	
19 May	Singapore Asian Satellite: Host: Singapore; Level: International Series; Format: 64MS/32WS/32MD/32WD/16XD	(Singapore) Riky Widianto (Singapore) Yao Lei	(Singapore) Chayut Triyachart (Singapore) Shinta Mulia Sari
19 May	Singapore Asian Satellite: Host: Singapore; Level: International Series; Format: 64MS/32WS/32MD/32WD/16XD	Score: 21–17, 21–18	
19 May	Spanish Open: Host: Madrid, Spain; Level: International Challenge; Format: 32MS/32WS/32MD/32WD/32XD	(India) Chetan Anand	(Sweden) Henri Hurskainen
19 May	Spanish Open: Host: Madrid, Spain; Level: International Challenge; Format: 32MS/32WS/32MD/32WD/32XD	Score: 23–21, 19–21, 21–15	
19 May	Spanish Open: Host: Madrid, Spain; Level: International Challenge; Format: 32MS/32WS/32MD/32WD/32XD	(Indonesia) Maria Elfira Christina	(India) Neha Pandit
19 May	Spanish Open: Host: Madrid, Spain; Level: International Challenge; Format: 32MS/32WS/32MD/32WD/32XD	Score: 21–16, 21–4	
19 May	Spanish Open: Host: Madrid, Spain; Level: International Challenge; Format: 32MS/32WS/32MD/32WD/32XD	(Indonesia) Fran Kurniawan (Indonesia) Rendra Wijaya	(Poland) Adam Cwalina (Poland) Wojciech Szkudlarczyk
19 May	Spanish Open: Host: Madrid, Spain; Level: International Challenge; Format: 32MS/32WS/32MD/32WD/32XD	Score: 21–11, 21–13	
19 May	Spanish Open: Host: Madrid, Spain; Level: International Challenge; Format: 32MS/32WS/32MD/32WD/32XD	(Indonesia) Shendy Puspa Irawati (Indonesia) Meiliana Jauhari	(Scotland) Jillie Cooper (Belgium) Nathalie Descamps
19 May	Spanish Open: Host: Madrid, Spain; Level: International Challenge; Format: 32MS/32WS/32MD/32WD/32XD	Score: 21–10, 21–10	
19 May	Spanish Open: Host: Madrid, Spain; Level: International Challenge; Format: 32MS/32WS/32MD/32WD/32XD	(Indonesia) Rendra Wijaya (Indonesia) Meiliana Jauhari	(Belgium) Wouter Claes (Belgium) Nathalie Descamps
19 May	Spanish Open: Host: Madrid, Spain; Level: International Challenge; Format: 32MS/32WS/32MD/32WD/32XD	Score: 21–14, 21–18	
26 May	Le Volant d'Or de Toulouse: Host: Toulouse, France; Level: International Challenge; Format: 32MS/32WS/32MD/16WD/32XD	(Indonesia) Andre Kurniawan Tedjono	(Indonesia) Ari Yuli Wahyu Hartanto
26 May	Le Volant d'Or de Toulouse: Host: Toulouse, France; Level: International Challenge; Format: 32MS/32WS/32MD/16WD/32XD	Score: 21–16, 22–20	
26 May	Le Volant d'Or de Toulouse: Host: Toulouse, France; Level: International Challenge; Format: 32MS/32WS/32MD/16WD/32XD	(Belarus) Olga Konon	(Scotland) Susan Hughes
26 May	Le Volant d'Or de Toulouse: Host: Toulouse, France; Level: International Challenge; Format: 32MS/32WS/32MD/16WD/32XD	Score: 21–18, 21–12	
26 May	Le Volant d'Or de Toulouse: Host: Toulouse, France; Level: International Challenge; Format: 32MS/32WS/32MD/16WD/32XD	(England) Richard Eidestedt (England) Andrew Ellis	(Belgium) Wouter Claes (Belgium) Frédéric Mawet
26 May	Le Volant d'Or de Toulouse: Host: Toulouse, France; Level: International Challenge; Format: 32MS/32WS/32MD/16WD/32XD	Score: 21–12, 21–12	
26 May	Le Volant d'Or de Toulouse: Host: Toulouse, France; Level: International Challenge; Format: 32MS/32WS/32MD/16WD/32XD	(Indonesia) Shendy Puspa Irawati (Indonesia) Meiliana Jauhari	(Netherlands) Rachel van Cutsen (Netherlands) Paulien van Dooremalen
26 May	Le Volant d'Or de Toulouse: Host: Toulouse, France; Level: International Challenge; Format: 32MS/32WS/32MD/16WD/32XD	Score: 21–15, 21–10	
26 May	Le Volant d'Or de Toulouse: Host: Toulouse, France; Level: International Challenge; Format: 32MS/32WS/32MD/16WD/32XD	(Indonesia) Fran Kurniawan (Indonesia) Shendy Puspa Irawati	(Indonesia) Rendra Wijaya (Indonesia) Meiliana Jauhari
26 May	Le Volant d'Or de Toulouse: Host: Toulouse, France; Level: International Challenge; Format: 32MS/32WS/32MD/16WD/32XD	Score: 21–18, 18–21, 21–14	

=== June ===
Week of	Tournament	Champions	Runners-up
2 June	Badminton Europe Circuit Finals: Host: Assen, Netherlands; Format: 4MS/4WS/2MD/2WD/2XD	(Germany) Marc Zwiebler	(Finland) Ville Lång
2 June	Badminton Europe Circuit Finals: Host: Assen, Netherlands; Format: 4MS/4WS/2MD/2WD/2XD	Score: 21–14, 19–21, 21–19	
2 June	Badminton Europe Circuit Finals: Host: Assen, Netherlands; Format: 4MS/4WS/2MD/2WD/2XD	(Germany) Juliane Schenk	(Estonia) Kati Tolmoff
2 June	Badminton Europe Circuit Finals: Host: Assen, Netherlands; Format: 4MS/4WS/2MD/2WD/2XD	Score: 21–16, 21–14	
2 June	Badminton Europe Circuit Finals: Host: Assen, Netherlands; Format: 4MS/4WS/2MD/2WD/2XD	(Germany) Kristof Hopp (Germany) Ingo Kindervater	(Belgium) Wouter Claes (Belgium) Frederic Mawet
2 June	Badminton Europe Circuit Finals: Host: Assen, Netherlands; Format: 4MS/4WS/2MD/2WD/2XD	Score: 16–21, 21–14, 21–16	
2 June	Badminton Europe Circuit Finals: Host: Assen, Netherlands; Format: 4MS/4WS/2MD/2WD/2XD	(Russia) Ekaterina Ananina (Russia) Anastasia Russkikh	(Russia) Valeria Sorokina (Russia) Nina Vislova
2 June	Badminton Europe Circuit Finals: Host: Assen, Netherlands; Format: 4MS/4WS/2MD/2WD/2XD	Score: 19–21, 21–13, 21–15	
2 June	Badminton Europe Circuit Finals: Host: Assen, Netherlands; Format: 4MS/4WS/2MD/2WD/2XD	(Russia) Aleksandr Nikolaenko (Russia) Nina Vislova	(Belgium) Wouter Claes (Belgium) Nathalie Descamps
2 June	Badminton Europe Circuit Finals: Host: Assen, Netherlands; Format: 4MS/4WS/2MD/2WD/2XD	Score: 21–7, 21–19	
9 June	Singapore Open (Draw): Host: Singapore; Level: Superseries; Format: 32MS/32WS/32MD/32WD/32XD	(Malaysia) Lee Chong Wei	(Indonesia) Simon Santoso
9 June	Singapore Open (Draw): Host: Singapore; Level: Superseries; Format: 32MS/32WS/32MD/32WD/32XD	Score: 21–13, 21–5	
9 June	Singapore Open (Draw): Host: Singapore; Level: Superseries; Format: 32MS/32WS/32MD/32WD/32XD	(Denmark) Tine Rasmussen	(Hong Kong) Zhou Mi
9 June	Singapore Open (Draw): Host: Singapore; Level: Superseries; Format: 32MS/32WS/32MD/32WD/32XD	Score: 21–19, 21–17	
9 June	Singapore Open (Draw): Host: Singapore; Level: Superseries; Format: 32MS/32WS/32MD/32WD/32XD	(Malaysia) Mohd Zakry Abdul Latif (Malaysia) Mohd Fairuzizuan Mohd Tazari	(Malaysia) Gan Teik Chai (Malaysia) Lin Woon Fui
9 June	Singapore Open (Draw): Host: Singapore; Level: Superseries; Format: 32MS/32WS/32MD/32WD/32XD	Score: 21–18, 21–17	
9 June	Singapore Open (Draw): Host: Singapore; Level: Superseries; Format: 32MS/32WS/32MD/32WD/32XD	(China) Du Jing (China) Yu Yang	(Chinese Taipei) Chien Yu-chin (Chinese Taipei) Cheng Wen-hsing
9 June	Singapore Open (Draw): Host: Singapore; Level: Superseries; Format: 32MS/32WS/32MD/32WD/32XD	Score: 21–16, 21–19	
9 June	Singapore Open (Draw): Host: Singapore; Level: Superseries; Format: 32MS/32WS/32MD/32WD/32XD	(Indonesia) Nova Widianto (Indonesia) Liliyana Natsir	(England) Anthony Clark (England) Donna Kellogg
9 June	Singapore Open (Draw): Host: Singapore; Level: Superseries; Format: 32MS/32WS/32MD/32WD/32XD	Score: 17–21, 21–14, 21–9	
9 June	European Cup (Draw): Host: Ramenskoye, Moscow, Russia; Level: Continental Club Championships; Format: 12 XT (Round robin)	(Russia) Prymorye; Players: Evgeny Dremin, Sergey Lunev, Stanislav Pukhov, Alexey Vasiliev, Wen Yue, Evgenia Dimova, Liu Fanhua, Irina Ruslyakova, Wan Dan, Zhang Haohan	(Russia) Favorit-Ramenskoe; Players: Andrey Ashmarin, Vladimir Ivanov, Anton Nazarenko, Aleksandr Nikolaenko, Alexander Schepalkin, Tatjana Bibik, Elena Chernyavskaya, Elena Shimko, Elena Sukhareva
9 June	European Cup (Draw): Host: Ramenskoye, Moscow, Russia; Level: Continental Club Championships; Format: 12 XT (Round robin)	Score: 4–1	
16 June	Indonesia Open (Draw): Host: Jakarta, Indonesia; Level: Superseries; Format: 32MS/32WS/32MD/32WD/32XD	(Indonesia) Sony Dwi Kuncoro	(Indonesia) Simon Santoso
16 June	Indonesia Open (Draw): Host: Jakarta, Indonesia; Level: Superseries; Format: 32MS/32WS/32MD/32WD/32XD	Score: 19–21, 21–14, 21–9	
16 June	Indonesia Open (Draw): Host: Jakarta, Indonesia; Level: Superseries; Format: 32MS/32WS/32MD/32WD/32XD	(China) Zhu Lin	(Indonesia) Maria Kristin Yulianti
16 June	Indonesia Open (Draw): Host: Jakarta, Indonesia; Level: Superseries; Format: 32MS/32WS/32MD/32WD/32XD	Score: 21–18, 17–21, 21–14	
16 June	Indonesia Open (Draw): Host: Jakarta, Indonesia; Level: Superseries; Format: 32MS/32WS/32MD/32WD/32XD	(Malaysia) Mohd Zakry Abdul Latif (Malaysia) Mohd Fairuzizuan Mohd Tazari	(United States) Tony Gunawan (Indonesia) Candra Wijaya
16 June	Indonesia Open (Draw): Host: Jakarta, Indonesia; Level: Superseries; Format: 32MS/32WS/32MD/32WD/32XD	Score: 19-21, 21–18, 21–14	
16 June	Indonesia Open (Draw): Host: Jakarta, Indonesia; Level: Superseries; Format: 32MS/32WS/32MD/32WD/32XD	(Indonesia) Vita Marissa (Indonesia) Liliyana Natsir	(Japan) Miyuki Maeda (Japan) Satoko Suetsuna
16 June	Indonesia Open (Draw): Host: Jakarta, Indonesia; Level: Superseries; Format: 32MS/32WS/32MD/32WD/32XD	Score: 21–15, 21–14	
16 June	Indonesia Open (Draw): Host: Jakarta, Indonesia; Level: Superseries; Format: 32MS/32WS/32MD/32WD/32XD	(China) Zheng Bo (China) Gao Ling	(Denmark) Thomas Laybourn (Denmark) Kamilla Rytter Juhl
16 June	Indonesia Open (Draw): Host: Jakarta, Indonesia; Level: Superseries; Format: 32MS/32WS/32MD/32WD/32XD	Score: 21–14, 21–8	
16 June	Nepal International: Host: Kathmandu, Nepal; Level: International Series; Format: 32MS/32WS/16MD/16WD/16XD	(India) Chetan Anand	(India) J. B. S. Vidyadhar
16 June	Nepal International: Host: Kathmandu, Nepal; Level: International Series; Format: 32MS/32WS/16MD/16WD/16XD	Score: 21–16, 21–17	
16 June	Nepal International: Host: Kathmandu, Nepal; Level: International Series; Format: 32MS/32WS/16MD/16WD/16XD	(India) Bibari Basumatary	(Sri Lanka) Thilini Jayasinghe
16 June	Nepal International: Host: Kathmandu, Nepal; Level: International Series; Format: 32MS/32WS/16MD/16WD/16XD	Score: 22–20, 23–21	
16 June	Nepal International: Host: Kathmandu, Nepal; Level: International Series; Format: 32MS/32WS/16MD/16WD/16XD	(India) Valiyaveetil Diju (India) Akshay Dewalkar	(Pakistan) Mohammad Attique (Pakistan) Rizwan Azam
16 June	Nepal International: Host: Kathmandu, Nepal; Level: International Series; Format: 32MS/32WS/16MD/16WD/16XD	Score: 19–21, 21–10, 21–12	
16 June	Nepal International: Host: Kathmandu, Nepal; Level: International Series; Format: 32MS/32WS/16MD/16WD/16XD	(India) Jwala Gutta (India) Shruti Kurien	(India) Kalita Anjali (India) P. Jyotshna
16 June	Nepal International: Host: Kathmandu, Nepal; Level: International Series; Format: 32MS/32WS/16MD/16WD/16XD	Score: 21–6, 21–8	
16 June	Nepal International: Host: Kathmandu, Nepal; Level: International Series; Format: 32MS/32WS/16MD/16WD/16XD	(India) Valiyaveetil Diju (India) Jwala Gutta	(India) J. B. S. Vidyadhar (India) Shruti Kurien
16 June	Nepal International: Host: Kathmandu, Nepal; Level: International Series; Format: 32MS/32WS/16MD/16WD/16XD	Score: 21–12, 21–15	
23 June	Thailand Open: Host: Bangkok, Thailand; Level: Grand Prix Gold; Format: 64MS/32WS/32MD/32WD/32XD	(China) Lin Dan	(Thailand) Boonsak Ponsana
23 June	Thailand Open: Host: Bangkok, Thailand; Level: Grand Prix Gold; Format: 64MS/32WS/32MD/32WD/32XD	Score: 17–21, 21–15, 21–13	
23 June	Thailand Open: Host: Bangkok, Thailand; Level: Grand Prix Gold; Format: 64MS/32WS/32MD/32WD/32XD	(China) Xie Xingfang	(China) Lu Lan
23 June	Thailand Open: Host: Bangkok, Thailand; Level: Grand Prix Gold; Format: 64MS/32WS/32MD/32WD/32XD	Score: 26–24, 21–7	
23 June	Thailand Open: Host: Bangkok, Thailand; Level: Grand Prix Gold; Format: 64MS/32WS/32MD/32WD/32XD	(China) Cai Yun (China) Fu Haifeng	(China) Guo Zhendong (China) Xie Zhongbo
23 June	Thailand Open: Host: Bangkok, Thailand; Level: Grand Prix Gold; Format: 64MS/32WS/32MD/32WD/32XD	Score: 21–17, retired	
23 June	Thailand Open: Host: Bangkok, Thailand; Level: Grand Prix Gold; Format: 64MS/32WS/32MD/32WD/32XD	(China) Yang Wei (China) Zhang Jiewen	(Malaysia) Chin Eei Hui (Malaysia) Wong Pei Tty
23 June	Thailand Open: Host: Bangkok, Thailand; Level: Grand Prix Gold; Format: 64MS/32WS/32MD/32WD/32XD	Score: 15–21, 21–13, 21–13	
23 June	Thailand Open: Host: Bangkok, Thailand; Level: Grand Prix Gold; Format: 64MS/32WS/32MD/32WD/32XD	(China) Xie Zhongbo (China) Zhang Yawen	(China) He Hanbin (China) Yu Yang
23 June	Thailand Open: Host: Bangkok, Thailand; Level: Grand Prix Gold; Format: 64MS/32WS/32MD/32WD/32XD	Score: 23–25, 21–10, 23–21	

=== July ===
Week of	Tournament	Champions	Runners-up
1 July	White Nights: Host: Gatchina, Russia; Level: International Challenge; Format: 64MS/32WS/32MD/32WD/32XD	(Finland) Ville Lång	(Czech Republic) Jan Vondra
1 July	White Nights: Host: Gatchina, Russia; Level: International Challenge; Format: 64MS/32WS/32MD/32WD/32XD	Score: 21–15, 21–8	
1 July	White Nights: Host: Gatchina, Russia; Level: International Challenge; Format: 64MS/32WS/32MD/32WD/32XD	(Germany) Xu Huaiwen	(Germany) Juliane Schenk
1 July	White Nights: Host: Gatchina, Russia; Level: International Challenge; Format: 64MS/32WS/32MD/32WD/32XD	Score: 21–15, 15–21, 21–19	
1 July	White Nights: Host: Gatchina, Russia; Level: International Challenge; Format: 64MS/32WS/32MD/32WD/32XD	(Poland) Michał Łogosz (Poland) Robert Mateusiak	(Russia) Vitalij Durkin (Russia) Aleksandr Nikolaenko
1 July	White Nights: Host: Gatchina, Russia; Level: International Challenge; Format: 64MS/32WS/32MD/32WD/32XD	Score: 21–8, 21–7	
1 July	White Nights: Host: Gatchina, Russia; Level: International Challenge; Format: 64MS/32WS/32MD/32WD/32XD	(Russia) Ekaterina Ananina (Russia) Anastasia Russkikh	(Russia) Valeria Sorokina (Russia) Nina Vislova
1 July	White Nights: Host: Gatchina, Russia; Level: International Challenge; Format: 64MS/32WS/32MD/32WD/32XD	Score: 21–12, 21–18	
1 July	White Nights: Host: Gatchina, Russia; Level: International Challenge; Format: 64MS/32WS/32MD/32WD/32XD	(Russia) Vitalij Durkin (Russia) Nina Vislova	(Poland) Robert Mateusiak (Poland) Nadieżda Kostiuczyk
1 July	White Nights: Host: Gatchina, Russia; Level: International Challenge; Format: 64MS/32WS/32MD/32WD/32XD	Score: 21–18, 21–14	
1 July	Vietnam International: Host: Ho Chi Minh City, Vietnam; Level: International Challenge; Format: 64MS/32WS/32MD/32WD/32XD	(Vietnam) Nguyễn Tiến Minh	(Malaysia) Chong Wei Feng
1 July	Vietnam International: Host: Ho Chi Minh City, Vietnam; Level: International Challenge; Format: 64MS/32WS/32MD/32WD/32XD	Score: 21–17, 10–21, 26–24	
1 July	Vietnam International: Host: Ho Chi Minh City, Vietnam; Level: International Challenge; Format: 64MS/32WS/32MD/32WD/32XD	(Malaysia) Lyddia Cheah	(Chinese Taipei) Hung Shih-han
1 July	Vietnam International: Host: Ho Chi Minh City, Vietnam; Level: International Challenge; Format: 64MS/32WS/32MD/32WD/32XD	Score: 22–20, 21–15	
1 July	Vietnam International: Host: Ho Chi Minh City, Vietnam; Level: International Challenge; Format: 64MS/32WS/32MD/32WD/32XD	(Malaysia) Hong Chieng Hun (Malaysia) Ng Kean Kok	(Malaysia) Mohd Razif Abdul Latif (Malaysia) Chan Peng Soon
1 July	Vietnam International: Host: Ho Chi Minh City, Vietnam; Level: International Challenge; Format: 64MS/32WS/32MD/32WD/32XD	Score: 19–21, 28–26, 21–13	
1 July	Vietnam International: Host: Ho Chi Minh City, Vietnam; Level: International Challenge; Format: 64MS/32WS/32MD/32WD/32XD	(Singapore) Frances Liu (Singapore) Vanessa Neo	(Singapore) Shinta Mulia Sari (Singapore) Yao Lei
1 July	Vietnam International: Host: Ho Chi Minh City, Vietnam; Level: International Challenge; Format: 64MS/32WS/32MD/32WD/32XD	Score: 21–15, 18–21, 21–16	
1 July	Vietnam International: Host: Ho Chi Minh City, Vietnam; Level: International Challenge; Format: 64MS/32WS/32MD/32WD/32XD	(Malaysia) Lim Khim Wah (Malaysia) Ng Hui Lin	(Malaysia) Mohd Razif Abdul Latif (Malaysia) Chong Sook Chin
1 July	Vietnam International: Host: Ho Chi Minh City, Vietnam; Level: International Challenge; Format: 64MS/32WS/32MD/32WD/32XD	Score: 21–15, 19–21, 21–15	
7 July	U.S. Open: Host: Orange, California, United States; Level: Grand Prix; Format: 64MS/32WS/32MD/32WD/32XD	(Canada) Andrew Dabeka	(Denmark) Martin Bille Larsen
7 July	U.S. Open: Host: Orange, California, United States; Level: Grand Prix; Format: 64MS/32WS/32MD/32WD/32XD	Score: 21–14, 21–9	
7 July	U.S. Open: Host: Orange, California, United States; Level: Grand Prix; Format: 64MS/32WS/32MD/32WD/32XD	(United States) Lili Zhou	(Republic of Ireland) Chloe Magee
7 July	U.S. Open: Host: Orange, California, United States; Level: Grand Prix; Format: 64MS/32WS/32MD/32WD/32XD	Score: 23–21, 21–16	
7 July	U.S. Open: Host: Orange, California, United States; Level: Grand Prix; Format: 64MS/32WS/32MD/32WD/32XD	(United States) Howard Bach (United States) Khan Malaythong	(United States) Halim Haryanto (United States) Raju Rai
7 July	U.S. Open: Host: Orange, California, United States; Level: Grand Prix; Format: 64MS/32WS/32MD/32WD/32XD	Score: 21–14, 21–19	
7 July	U.S. Open: Host: Orange, California, United States; Level: Grand Prix; Format: 64MS/32WS/32MD/32WD/32XD	(Chinese Taipei) Chang Li-ying (Chinese Taipei) Hung Shih-chieh	(Chinese Taipei) Tsai Pei-ling (Chinese Taipei) Yang Chia-chen
7 July	U.S. Open: Host: Orange, California, United States; Level: Grand Prix; Format: 64MS/32WS/32MD/32WD/32XD	Score: 21–19, 21–14	
7 July	U.S. Open: Host: Orange, California, United States; Level: Grand Prix; Format: 64MS/32WS/32MD/32WD/32XD	(United States) Halim Haryanto (United States) Peng Yun	(Canada) Mike Beres (Canada) Valerie Loker
7 July	U.S. Open: Host: Orange, California, United States; Level: Grand Prix; Format: 64MS/32WS/32MD/32WD/32XD	Score: 21–13, 21–16	
21 July	Australian International: Host: Wendouree, Victoria, Australia; Level: International Challenge; Format: 64MS/64WS/32MD/32WD/64XD	(Malaysia) Lee Tsuen Seng	(Malaysia) Sairul Amar Ayob
21 July	Australian International: Host: Wendouree, Victoria, Australia; Level: International Challenge; Format: 64MS/64WS/32MD/32WD/64XD	Score: 21–16, 19–21, 21–15	
21 July	Australian International: Host: Wendouree, Victoria, Australia; Level: International Challenge; Format: 64MS/64WS/32MD/32WD/64XD	(Japan) Mizuki Fujii	(Japan) Megumi Taruno
21 July	Australian International: Host: Wendouree, Victoria, Australia; Level: International Challenge; Format: 64MS/64WS/32MD/32WD/64XD	Score: 21–16, 21–17	
21 July	Australian International: Host: Wendouree, Victoria, Australia; Level: International Challenge; Format: 64MS/64WS/32MD/32WD/64XD	(South Korea) Choi Sang-won (South Korea) Kim Sa-rang	(Chinese Taipei) Chien Yu-hsun (Chinese Taipei) Lin Yu-lang
21 July	Australian International: Host: Wendouree, Victoria, Australia; Level: International Challenge; Format: 64MS/64WS/32MD/32WD/64XD	Score: 21–17, 16–21, 21–11	
21 July	Australian International: Host: Wendouree, Victoria, Australia; Level: International Challenge; Format: 64MS/64WS/32MD/32WD/64XD	(Japan) Yasuyo Imabeppu (Japan) Shizuka Matsuo	(Chinese Taipei) Hsieh Pei-chen (Chinese Taipei) Lee Tai-an
21 July	Australian International: Host: Wendouree, Victoria, Australia; Level: International Challenge; Format: 64MS/64WS/32MD/32WD/64XD	Score: 21–17, 21–10	
21 July	Australian International: Host: Wendouree, Victoria, Australia; Level: International Challenge; Format: 64MS/64WS/32MD/32WD/64XD	(Chinese Taipei) Chen Hung-ling (Chinese Taipei) Chou Chia-chi	(Japan) Noriyasu Hirata (Japan) Shizuka Matsuo
21 July	Australian International: Host: Wendouree, Victoria, Australia; Level: International Challenge; Format: 64MS/64WS/32MD/32WD/64XD	Score: 21–16, 21–4	

=== August ===
Week of	Tournament	Champions	Runners-up
4 August	Olympic Games (Draw): Host: Beijing, China; Level: BWF Major Event – Multi-Sport Event; Format: 64MS/64WS/16MD/16WD/16XD	(China) Lin Dan	(Malaysia) Lee Chong Wei
4 August	Olympic Games (Draw): Host: Beijing, China; Level: BWF Major Event – Multi-Sport Event; Format: 64MS/64WS/16MD/16WD/16XD	Score: 21–12, 21–8	
4 August	Olympic Games (Draw): Host: Beijing, China; Level: BWF Major Event – Multi-Sport Event; Format: 64MS/64WS/16MD/16WD/16XD	(China) Zhang Ning	(China) Xie Xingfang
4 August	Olympic Games (Draw): Host: Beijing, China; Level: BWF Major Event – Multi-Sport Event; Format: 64MS/64WS/16MD/16WD/16XD	Score: 21–12, 10–21, 21–18	
4 August	Olympic Games (Draw): Host: Beijing, China; Level: BWF Major Event – Multi-Sport Event; Format: 64MS/64WS/16MD/16WD/16XD	(Indonesia) Markis Kido (Indonesia) Hendra Setiawan	(China) Cai Yun (China) Fu Haifeng
4 August	Olympic Games (Draw): Host: Beijing, China; Level: BWF Major Event – Multi-Sport Event; Format: 64MS/64WS/16MD/16WD/16XD	Score: 12–21, 21–11, 21–16	
4 August	Olympic Games (Draw): Host: Beijing, China; Level: BWF Major Event – Multi-Sport Event; Format: 64MS/64WS/16MD/16WD/16XD	(China) Du Jing (China) Yu Yang	(South Korea) Lee Kyung-won (South Korea) Lee Hyo-jung
4 August	Olympic Games (Draw): Host: Beijing, China; Level: BWF Major Event – Multi-Sport Event; Format: 64MS/64WS/16MD/16WD/16XD	Score: 21–15, 21–13	
4 August	Olympic Games (Draw): Host: Beijing, China; Level: BWF Major Event – Multi-Sport Event; Format: 64MS/64WS/16MD/16WD/16XD	(South Korea) Lee Yong-dae (South Korea) Lee Hyo-jung	(Indonesia) Nova Widianto (Indonesia) Liliyana Natsir
4 August	Olympic Games (Draw): Host: Beijing, China; Level: BWF Major Event – Multi-Sport Event; Format: 64MS/64WS/16MD/16WD/16XD	Score: 21–11, 21–17	
25 August	Indonesia International: Host: Surabaya, Indonesia; Level: International Challenge; Format: 128MS/64WS/64MD/32WD/64XD	(Indonesia) Andre Kurniawan Tedjono	(Indonesia) Ari Yuli Wahyu Hartanto
25 August	Indonesia International: Host: Surabaya, Indonesia; Level: International Challenge; Format: 128MS/64WS/64MD/32WD/64XD	Score: 21–13, 21–16	
25 August	Indonesia International: Host: Surabaya, Indonesia; Level: International Challenge; Format: 128MS/64WS/64MD/32WD/64XD	(South Korea) Bae Youn-joo	(Indonesia) Rosaria Yusfin Pungkasari
25 August	Indonesia International: Host: Surabaya, Indonesia; Level: International Challenge; Format: 128MS/64WS/64MD/32WD/64XD	Score: 21–18, 23–21	
25 August	Indonesia International: Host: Surabaya, Indonesia; Level: International Challenge; Format: 128MS/64WS/64MD/32WD/64XD	(Indonesia) Fran Kurniawan (Indonesia) Rendra Wijaya	(Indonesia) Wifqi Windarto (Indonesia) Afiat Yuris Wirawan
25 August	Indonesia International: Host: Surabaya, Indonesia; Level: International Challenge; Format: 128MS/64WS/64MD/32WD/64XD	Score: 21–18, 21–13	
25 August	Indonesia International: Host: Surabaya, Indonesia; Level: International Challenge; Format: 128MS/64WS/64MD/32WD/64XD	(Indonesia) Shendy Puspa Irawati (Indonesia) Meiliana Jauhari	(Singapore) Yao Lei (Singapore) Shinta Mulia Sari
25 August	Indonesia International: Host: Surabaya, Indonesia; Level: International Challenge; Format: 128MS/64WS/64MD/32WD/64XD	Score: 21–14, 21–18	
25 August	Indonesia International: Host: Surabaya, Indonesia; Level: International Challenge; Format: 128MS/64WS/64MD/32WD/64XD	(Indonesia) Fran Kurniawan (Indonesia) Shendy Puspa Irawati	(Singapore) Chayut Triyachart (Singapore) Yao Lei
25 August	Indonesia International: Host: Surabaya, Indonesia; Level: International Challenge; Format: 128MS/64WS/64MD/32WD/64XD	Score: 21–19, 21–13	

=== September ===
Week of	Tournament	Champions	Runners-up
1 September	Waikato International: Host: Hamilton, New Zealand; Level: International Series; Format: 32MS/32WS/16MD/16WD/32XD	(India) Ajay Jayaram	(India) Prakash Jolly
1 September	Waikato International: Host: Hamilton, New Zealand; Level: International Series; Format: 32MS/32WS/16MD/16WD/32XD	Score: 21–11, 21–14	
1 September	Waikato International: Host: Hamilton, New Zealand; Level: International Series; Format: 32MS/32WS/16MD/16WD/32XD	(Japan) Ayaka Takahashi	(Japan) Sayaka Sato
1 September	Waikato International: Host: Hamilton, New Zealand; Level: International Series; Format: 32MS/32WS/16MD/16WD/32XD	Score: 21–11, 17–21, 28–26	
1 September	Waikato International: Host: Hamilton, New Zealand; Level: International Series; Format: 32MS/32WS/16MD/16WD/32XD	(Japan) Rei Sato (Japan) Naomasa Senkyo	(New Zealand) Craig Cooper (New Zealand) Joe Wu
1 September	Waikato International: Host: Hamilton, New Zealand; Level: International Series; Format: 32MS/32WS/16MD/16WD/32XD	Score: 21–16, 21–15	
1 September	Waikato International: Host: Hamilton, New Zealand; Level: International Series; Format: 32MS/32WS/16MD/16WD/32XD	(Japan) Ayaka Takahashi (Japan) Koharu Yonemoto	(New Zealand) Renee Flavell (New Zealand) Rachel Hindley
1 September	Waikato International: Host: Hamilton, New Zealand; Level: International Series; Format: 32MS/32WS/16MD/16WD/32XD	Score: 21–18, 21–19	
1 September	Waikato International: Host: Hamilton, New Zealand; Level: International Series; Format: 32MS/32WS/16MD/16WD/32XD	(New Zealand) Henry Tam (New Zealand) Donna Haliday	(Japan) Naomasa Senkyo (Japan) Misaki Matsutomo
1 September	Waikato International: Host: Hamilton, New Zealand; Level: International Series; Format: 32MS/32WS/16MD/16WD/32XD	Score: 21–13, 21–18	
1 September	Belgian International: Host: Mechelen, Belgium; Level: International Challenge; Format: 32MS/32WS/32MD/32WD/32XD	(Japan) Kenichi Tago	(India) Chetan Anand
1 September	Belgian International: Host: Mechelen, Belgium; Level: International Challenge; Format: 32MS/32WS/32MD/32WD/32XD	Score: 21–16, 15–21, 21–19	
1 September	Belgian International: Host: Mechelen, Belgium; Level: International Challenge; Format: 32MS/32WS/32MD/32WD/32XD	(Germany) Juliane Schenk	(Scotland) Susan Hughes
1 September	Belgian International: Host: Mechelen, Belgium; Level: International Challenge; Format: 32MS/32WS/32MD/32WD/32XD	Score: 21–12, 21–18	
1 September	Belgian International: Host: Mechelen, Belgium; Level: International Challenge; Format: 32MS/32WS/32MD/32WD/32XD	(Scotland) Andrew Bowman (Wales) Martyn Lewis	(Germany) Peter Käsbauer (Germany) Roman Spitko
1 September	Belgian International: Host: Mechelen, Belgium; Level: International Challenge; Format: 32MS/32WS/32MD/32WD/32XD	Score: 21–14, 21–15	
1 September	Belgian International: Host: Mechelen, Belgium; Level: International Challenge; Format: 32MS/32WS/32MD/32WD/32XD	(Russia) Valeria Sorokina (Russia) Nina Vislova	(Netherlands) Rachel van Cutsen (Netherlands) Paulien van Dooremalen
1 September	Belgian International: Host: Mechelen, Belgium; Level: International Challenge; Format: 32MS/32WS/32MD/32WD/32XD	Score: 21–10, 21–12	
1 September	Belgian International: Host: Mechelen, Belgium; Level: International Challenge; Format: 32MS/32WS/32MD/32WD/32XD	(Russia) Vitalij Durkin (Russia) Nina Vislova	(Scotland) Watson Briggs (Scotland) Jillie Cooper
1 September	Belgian International: Host: Mechelen, Belgium; Level: International Challenge; Format: 32MS/32WS/32MD/32WD/32XD	Score: 21–13, 21–9	
8 September	Chinese Taipei Open: Host: Taipei, Chinese Taipei; Level: Grand Prix Gold; Format: 64MS/32WS/32MD/32WD/32XD	(Indonesia) Simon Santoso	(Malaysia) Muhammad Roslin Hashim
8 September	Chinese Taipei Open: Host: Taipei, Chinese Taipei; Level: Grand Prix Gold; Format: 64MS/32WS/32MD/32WD/32XD	Score: 21–18, 13–21, 21–10	
8 September	Chinese Taipei Open: Host: Taipei, Chinese Taipei; Level: Grand Prix Gold; Format: 64MS/32WS/32MD/32WD/32XD	(India) Saina Nehwal	(Malaysia) Lydia Li Ya Cheah
8 September	Chinese Taipei Open: Host: Taipei, Chinese Taipei; Level: Grand Prix Gold; Format: 64MS/32WS/32MD/32WD/32XD	Score: 21–8, 21–19	
8 September	Chinese Taipei Open: Host: Taipei, Chinese Taipei; Level: Grand Prix Gold; Format: 64MS/32WS/32MD/32WD/32XD	(Denmark) Mathias Boe (Denmark) Carsten Mogensen	(Indonesia) Candra Wijaya (United States) Tony Gunawan
8 September	Chinese Taipei Open: Host: Taipei, Chinese Taipei; Level: Grand Prix Gold; Format: 64MS/32WS/32MD/32WD/32XD	Score: 22–20, 21–14	
8 September	Chinese Taipei Open: Host: Taipei, Chinese Taipei; Level: Grand Prix Gold; Format: 64MS/32WS/32MD/32WD/32XD	(Chinese Taipei) Chien Yu-chin (Chinese Taipei) Cheng Wen-hsing	(Indonesia) Rani Mundiasti (Indonesia) Jo Novita
8 September	Chinese Taipei Open: Host: Taipei, Chinese Taipei; Level: Grand Prix Gold; Format: 64MS/32WS/32MD/32WD/32XD	Score: 21–16, 21–17	
8 September	Chinese Taipei Open: Host: Taipei, Chinese Taipei; Level: Grand Prix Gold; Format: 64MS/32WS/32MD/32WD/32XD	(Indonesia) Devin Lahardi Fitriawan (Indonesia) Lita Nurlita	(Chinese Taipei) Fang Chieh-min (Chinese Taipei) Cheng Wen-hsing
8 September	Chinese Taipei Open: Host: Taipei, Chinese Taipei; Level: Grand Prix Gold; Format: 64MS/32WS/32MD/32WD/32XD	Score: 14–21, 21–11, 21–19	
8 September	North Shore City International: Host: North Shore, New Zealand; Level: International Series; Format: 64MS/32WS/32MD/32WD/32XD	(New Zealand) John Moody	(India) Ajay Jayaram
8 September	North Shore City International: Host: North Shore, New Zealand; Level: International Series; Format: 64MS/32WS/32MD/32WD/32XD	Score: 21–16, 22–20	
8 September	North Shore City International: Host: North Shore, New Zealand; Level: International Series; Format: 64MS/32WS/32MD/32WD/32XD	(Japan) Sayaka Sato	(Japan) Misaki Matsutomo
8 September	North Shore City International: Host: North Shore, New Zealand; Level: International Series; Format: 64MS/32WS/32MD/32WD/32XD	Score: 21–18, 22–20	
8 September	North Shore City International: Host: North Shore, New Zealand; Level: International Series; Format: 64MS/32WS/32MD/32WD/32XD	(Japan) Rei Sato (Japan) Naomasa Senkyo	(New Zealand) John Gordon (New Zealand) John Moody
8 September	North Shore City International: Host: North Shore, New Zealand; Level: International Series; Format: 64MS/32WS/32MD/32WD/32XD	Score: 21–11, 15–21, 21–13	
8 September	North Shore City International: Host: North Shore, New Zealand; Level: International Series; Format: 64MS/32WS/32MD/32WD/32XD	(Japan) Ayaka Takahashi (Japan) Koharu Yonemoto	(New Zealand) Renee Flavell (New Zealand) Rachel Hindley
8 September	North Shore City International: Host: North Shore, New Zealand; Level: International Series; Format: 64MS/32WS/32MD/32WD/32XD	Score: 21–9, 21–15	
8 September	North Shore City International: Host: North Shore, New Zealand; Level: International Series; Format: 64MS/32WS/32MD/32WD/32XD	(New Zealand) Henry Tam (New Zealand) Donna Haliday	(New Zealand) Joe Wu (New Zealand) Danielle Barry
8 September	North Shore City International: Host: North Shore, New Zealand; Level: International Series; Format: 64MS/32WS/32MD/32WD/32XD	Score: 21–14, 21–12	
15 September	Japan Open (Draw): Host: Tokyo, Japan; Level: Superseries; Format: 32MS/32WS/32MD/32WD/32XD	(Indonesia) Sony Dwi Kuncoro	(Malaysia) Lee Chong Wei
15 September	Japan Open (Draw): Host: Tokyo, Japan; Level: Superseries; Format: 32MS/32WS/32MD/32WD/32XD	Score: 21–17, 21–11	
15 September	Japan Open (Draw): Host: Tokyo, Japan; Level: Superseries; Format: 32MS/32WS/32MD/32WD/32XD	(China) Wang Yihan	(Hong Kong) Zhou Mi
15 September	Japan Open (Draw): Host: Tokyo, Japan; Level: Superseries; Format: 32MS/32WS/32MD/32WD/32XD	Score: 21–19, 17–21, 21–16	
15 September	Japan Open (Draw): Host: Tokyo, Japan; Level: Superseries; Format: 32MS/32WS/32MD/32WD/32XD	(Denmark) Lars Paaske (Denmark) Jonas Rasmussen	(Indonesia) Mohammad Ahsan (Indonesia) Bona Septano
15 September	Japan Open (Draw): Host: Tokyo, Japan; Level: Superseries; Format: 32MS/32WS/32MD/32WD/32XD	Score: 21–17, 15–21, 21–13	
15 September	Japan Open (Draw): Host: Tokyo, Japan; Level: Superseries; Format: 32MS/32WS/32MD/32WD/32XD	(China) Cheng Shu (China) Zhao Yunlei	(Malaysia) Chin Eei Hui (Malaysia) Wong Pei Tty
15 September	Japan Open (Draw): Host: Tokyo, Japan; Level: Superseries; Format: 32MS/32WS/32MD/32WD/32XD	Score: 21–19, 5–21, 21–18	
15 September	Japan Open (Draw): Host: Tokyo, Japan; Level: Superseries; Format: 32MS/32WS/32MD/32WD/32XD	(Indonesia) Muhammad Rijal (Indonesia) Vita Marissa	(Indonesia) Nova Widianto (Indonesia) Lilyana Natsir
15 September	Japan Open (Draw): Host: Tokyo, Japan; Level: Superseries; Format: 32MS/32WS/32MD/32WD/32XD	Score: 14–21, 21–15, 21–19	
22 September	China Masters (Draw): Host: Changzhou, China; Level: Superseries; Format: 32MS/32WS/32MD/16WD/16XD	(Indonesia) Sony Dwi Kuncoro	(China) Chen Jin
22 September	China Masters (Draw): Host: Changzhou, China; Level: Superseries; Format: 32MS/32WS/32MD/16WD/16XD	Score: 21–19, 21–18	
22 September	China Masters (Draw): Host: Changzhou, China; Level: Superseries; Format: 32MS/32WS/32MD/16WD/16XD	(Hong Kong) Zhou Mi	(China) Wang Lin
22 September	China Masters (Draw): Host: Changzhou, China; Level: Superseries; Format: 32MS/32WS/32MD/16WD/16XD	Score: 21–19, 19–21, 21–16	
22 September	China Masters (Draw): Host: Changzhou, China; Level: Superseries; Format: 32MS/32WS/32MD/16WD/16XD	(Indonesia) Markis Kido (Indonesia) Hendra Setiawan	(China) Sun Junjie (China) Xu Chen
22 September	China Masters (Draw): Host: Changzhou, China; Level: Superseries; Format: 32MS/32WS/32MD/16WD/16XD	Score: 21–17, 24–22	
22 September	China Masters (Draw): Host: Changzhou, China; Level: Superseries; Format: 32MS/32WS/32MD/16WD/16XD	(China) Cheng Shu (China) Zhao Yunlei	(Macau) Zhang Dan (Macau) Zhang Zhibo
22 September	China Masters (Draw): Host: Changzhou, China; Level: Superseries; Format: 32MS/32WS/32MD/16WD/16XD	Score: 21–14, 21–11	
22 September	China Masters (Draw): Host: Changzhou, China; Level: Superseries; Format: 32MS/32WS/32MD/16WD/16XD	(China) Xie Zhongbo (China) Zhang Yawen	(Indonesia) Nova Widianto (Indonesia) Liliyana Natsir
22 September	China Masters (Draw): Host: Changzhou, China; Level: Superseries; Format: 32MS/32WS/32MD/16WD/16XD	Score: 21–17, 21–17	
22 September	Mongolia International: Host: Ulaanbaatar, Mongolia; Level: International Series; Format: 16MS/16WS/8MD/16XD	(Scotland) Alistair Casey	(Mongolia) Enkhbat Olonbayar
22 September	Mongolia International: Host: Ulaanbaatar, Mongolia; Level: International Series; Format: 16MS/16WS/8MD/16XD	Score: 21–18, 21–11	
22 September	Mongolia International: Host: Ulaanbaatar, Mongolia; Level: International Series; Format: 16MS/16WS/8MD/16XD	(Mongolia) Gerelmaa Batchuluun	(Mongolia) Ganchuluun Boldbaatar
22 September	Mongolia International: Host: Ulaanbaatar, Mongolia; Level: International Series; Format: 16MS/16WS/8MD/16XD	Score: 21–13, 21–15	
22 September	Mongolia International: Host: Ulaanbaatar, Mongolia; Level: International Series; Format: 16MS/16WS/8MD/16XD	(Scotland) Alistair Casey (Austria) Clemens Michael Smola	(Mongolia) Davaasuren Battur (Mongolia) Zolzaya Munkhbaatar
22 September	Mongolia International: Host: Ulaanbaatar, Mongolia; Level: International Series; Format: 16MS/16WS/8MD/16XD	Score: 21–15, 22–20	
22 September	Mongolia International: Host: Ulaanbaatar, Mongolia; Level: International Series; Format: 16MS/16WS/8MD/16XD	(Mongolia) Enkhbat Olonbayar (Mongolia) Gerelmaa Batchuluun	(Mongolia) Davaasuren Battur (Mongolia) Zolzaya Gankhuyang
22 September	Mongolia International: Host: Ulaanbaatar, Mongolia; Level: International Series; Format: 16MS/16WS/8MD/16XD	Score: 21–19, 21–14	
22 September	Czech International: Host: Brno, Czech Republic; Level: International Challenge; Format: 32MS/32WS/32MD/32WD/32XD	(India) Chetan Anand	(England) Carl Baxter
22 September	Czech International: Host: Brno, Czech Republic; Level: International Challenge; Format: 32MS/32WS/32MD/32WD/32XD	Score: 21–15, 21–14	
22 September	Czech International: Host: Brno, Czech Republic; Level: International Challenge; Format: 32MS/32WS/32MD/32WD/32XD	(Russia) Ella Diehl	(Netherlands) Judith Meulendijks
22 September	Czech International: Host: Brno, Czech Republic; Level: International Challenge; Format: 32MS/32WS/32MD/32WD/32XD	Score: 21–14, 21–13	
22 September	Czech International: Host: Brno, Czech Republic; Level: International Challenge; Format: 32MS/32WS/32MD/32WD/32XD	(Denmark) Kasper Faust Henriksen (Denmark) Christian Skovgaard	(Denmark) Jacob Chemnitz (Denmark) Mikkel Delbo Larsen
22 September	Czech International: Host: Brno, Czech Republic; Level: International Challenge; Format: 32MS/32WS/32MD/32WD/32XD	Score: 21–16, 21–16	
22 September	Czech International: Host: Brno, Czech Republic; Level: International Challenge; Format: 32MS/32WS/32MD/32WD/32XD	(Denmark) Helle Nielsen (Denmark) Marie Røpke	(Belgium) Séverine Corvilain (Belgium) Nathalie Descamps
22 September	Czech International: Host: Brno, Czech Republic; Level: International Challenge; Format: 32MS/32WS/32MD/32WD/32XD	Score: 21–14, 21–15	
22 September	Czech International: Host: Brno, Czech Republic; Level: International Challenge; Format: 32MS/32WS/32MD/32WD/32XD	(Denmark) Rasmus Bonde (Denmark) Helle Nielsen	(Denmark) Mikkel Delbo Larsen (Denmark) Mie Schjøtt-Kristensen
22 September	Czech International: Host: Brno, Czech Republic; Level: International Challenge; Format: 32MS/32WS/32MD/32WD/32XD	Score: 21–12, 21–11	
29 September	Bitburger Open: Host: Saarbrücken, Germany; Level: Grand Prix; Format: 64MS/32WS/32MD/32WD/32XD	(India) Chetan Anand	(India) Arvind Bhat
29 September	Bitburger Open: Host: Saarbrücken, Germany; Level: Grand Prix; Format: 64MS/32WS/32MD/32WD/32XD	Score: 23–25, 24–22, 23–21	
29 September	Bitburger Open: Host: Saarbrücken, Germany; Level: Grand Prix; Format: 64MS/32WS/32MD/32WD/32XD	(Indonesia) Maria Febe Kusumastuti	(India) Aditi Mutatkar
29 September	Bitburger Open: Host: Saarbrücken, Germany; Level: Grand Prix; Format: 64MS/32WS/32MD/32WD/32XD	Score: 22–24, 21–8, 23–21	
29 September	Bitburger Open: Host: Saarbrücken, Germany; Level: Grand Prix; Format: 64MS/32WS/32MD/32WD/32XD	(Denmark) Mathias Boe (Denmark) Carsten Mogensen	(Germany) Kristof Hopp (Germany) Johannes Schottler
29 September	Bitburger Open: Host: Saarbrücken, Germany; Level: Grand Prix; Format: 64MS/32WS/32MD/32WD/32XD	Score: 21–11, 21–15	
29 September	Bitburger Open: Host: Saarbrücken, Germany; Level: Grand Prix; Format: 64MS/32WS/32MD/32WD/32XD	(Denmark) Helle Nielsen (Denmark) Marie Roepke	(Indonesia) Shendy Puspa Irawati (Indonesia) Meiliana Jauhari
29 September	Bitburger Open: Host: Saarbrücken, Germany; Level: Grand Prix; Format: 64MS/32WS/32MD/32WD/32XD	Score: 21–15, 21–18	
29 September	Bitburger Open: Host: Saarbrücken, Germany; Level: Grand Prix; Format: 64MS/32WS/32MD/32WD/32XD	(India) Valiyaveetil Diju (India) Jwala Gutta	(Denmark) Joachim Fischer Nielsen (Denmark) Christinna Pedersen
29 September	Bitburger Open: Host: Saarbrücken, Germany; Level: Grand Prix; Format: 64MS/32WS/32MD/32WD/32XD	Score: 8–21, 21–17, 22–20	
29 September	Macau Open: Host: Macau; Level: Grand Prix Gold; Format: 64MS/32WS/32MD/32WD/32XD	(Indonesia) Taufik Hidayat	(Malaysia) Lee Chong Wei
29 September	Macau Open: Host: Macau; Level: Grand Prix Gold; Format: 64MS/32WS/32MD/32WD/32XD	Score: 21–19, 21–15	
29 September	Macau Open: Host: Macau; Level: Grand Prix Gold; Format: 64MS/32WS/32MD/32WD/32XD	(Hong Kong) Zhou Mi	(Malaysia) Julia Wong Pei Xian
29 September	Macau Open: Host: Macau; Level: Grand Prix Gold; Format: 64MS/32WS/32MD/32WD/32XD	Score: 21–13, 21–19	
29 September	Macau Open: Host: Macau; Level: Grand Prix Gold; Format: 64MS/32WS/32MD/32WD/32XD	(Malaysia) Koo Kien Keat (Malaysia) Tan Boon Heong	(Chinese Taipei) Fang Chieh-min (Chinese Taipei) Lee Sheng-mu
29 September	Macau Open: Host: Macau; Level: Grand Prix Gold; Format: 64MS/32WS/32MD/32WD/32XD	ScorIe: 21–16, 21–18	
29 September	Macau Open: Host: Macau; Level: Grand Prix Gold; Format: 64MS/32WS/32MD/32WD/32XD	(China) Cheng Shu (China) Zhao Yunlei	(China) Ma Jin (China) Wang Xiaoli
29 September	Macau Open: Host: Macau; Level: Grand Prix Gold; Format: 64MS/32WS/32MD/32WD/32XD	Score: 21–15, 21–18	
29 September	Macau Open: Host: Macau; Level: Grand Prix Gold; Format: 64MS/32WS/32MD/32WD/32XD	(China) Xu Chen (China) Zhao Yunlei	(Hong Kong) Yohan Hadikusumo Wiratama (Hong Kong) Chau Hoi Wah
29 September	Macau Open: Host: Macau; Level: Grand Prix Gold; Format: 64MS/32WS/32MD/32WD/32XD	Score: 21–15, 21–16	

=== October ===
Week of	Tournament	Champions	Runners-up
1 October	Pan Am Badminton Championships (Draw): Host: Lima, Peru; Level: Continental Championships; Format: 9XT/64MS/32WS/32MD/16WD/32XD	Canada	Peru
1 October	Pan Am Badminton Championships (Draw): Host: Lima, Peru; Level: Continental Championships; Format: 9XT/64MS/32WS/32MD/16WD/32XD	Score: 3–2	
1 October	Pan Am Badminton Championships (Draw): Host: Lima, Peru; Level: Continental Championships; Format: 9XT/64MS/32WS/32MD/16WD/32XD	(Canada) David Snider	(Canada) Stephan Wojcikiewicz
1 October	Pan Am Badminton Championships (Draw): Host: Lima, Peru; Level: Continental Championships; Format: 9XT/64MS/32WS/32MD/16WD/32XD	Score: 21–7, 23–21	
1 October	Pan Am Badminton Championships (Draw): Host: Lima, Peru; Level: Continental Championships; Format: 9XT/64MS/32WS/32MD/16WD/32XD	(Peru) Claudia Rivero	(Peru) Cristina Aicardi
1 October	Pan Am Badminton Championships (Draw): Host: Lima, Peru; Level: Continental Championships; Format: 9XT/64MS/32WS/32MD/16WD/32XD	Score: 21–14, 21–16	
1 October	Pan Am Badminton Championships (Draw): Host: Lima, Peru; Level: Continental Championships; Format: 9XT/64MS/32WS/32MD/16WD/32XD	(Canada) Toby Ng (Canada) William Milroy	(Guatemala) Rodolfo Ramírez (Guatemala) Kevin Cordón
1 October	Pan Am Badminton Championships (Draw): Host: Lima, Peru; Level: Continental Championships; Format: 9XT/64MS/32WS/32MD/16WD/32XD	Score: 21–16, 21–9	
1 October	Pan Am Badminton Championships (Draw): Host: Lima, Peru; Level: Continental Championships; Format: 9XT/64MS/32WS/32MD/16WD/32XD	(Peru) Cristina Aicardi (Peru) Claudia Rivero	(Canada) Fiona McKee (Canada) Valerie Loker
1 October	Pan Am Badminton Championships (Draw): Host: Lima, Peru; Level: Continental Championships; Format: 9XT/64MS/32WS/32MD/16WD/32XD	Score: 21–19, 21–15	
1 October	Pan Am Badminton Championships (Draw): Host: Lima, Peru; Level: Continental Championships; Format: 9XT/64MS/32WS/32MD/16WD/32XD	(Canada) William Milroy (Canada) Fiona McKee	(Canada) Toby Ng (Canada) Valerie Loker
1 October	Pan Am Badminton Championships (Draw): Host: Lima, Peru; Level: Continental Championships; Format: 9XT/64MS/32WS/32MD/16WD/32XD	Score: 21–12, 16–21, 21–18	
1 October	Bulgarian International: Host: Sofia, Bulgaria; Level: International Challenge; Format: 32MS/32WS/32MD/32WD/32XD	(Japan) Yuichi Ikeda	(Estonia) Raul Must
1 October	Bulgarian International: Host: Sofia, Bulgaria; Level: International Challenge; Format: 32MS/32WS/32MD/32WD/32XD	Score: 21–17, 22–20	
1 October	Bulgarian International: Host: Sofia, Bulgaria; Level: International Challenge; Format: 32MS/32WS/32MD/32WD/32XD	(Bulgaria) Petya Nedelcheva	(Scotland) Susan Hughes
1 October	Bulgarian International: Host: Sofia, Bulgaria; Level: International Challenge; Format: 32MS/32WS/32MD/32WD/32XD	Score: 21–11, 21–15	
1 October	Bulgarian International: Host: Sofia, Bulgaria; Level: International Challenge; Format: 32MS/32WS/32MD/32WD/32XD	(Russia) Vitalij Durkin (Russia) Aleksandr Nikolaenko	(Poland) Adam Cwalina (Poland) Wojciech Szkudlarczyk
1 October	Bulgarian International: Host: Sofia, Bulgaria; Level: International Challenge; Format: 32MS/32WS/32MD/32WD/32XD	Score: 21–23, 21–12, 22–20	
1 October	Bulgarian International: Host: Sofia, Bulgaria; Level: International Challenge; Format: 32MS/32WS/32MD/32WD/32XD	(Russia) Valeria Sorokina (Russia) Nina Vislova	(Sweden) Emelie Lennartsson (Sweden) Emma Wengberg
1 October	Bulgarian International: Host: Sofia, Bulgaria; Level: International Challenge; Format: 32MS/32WS/32MD/32WD/32XD	Score: 21–16, 21–6	
1 October	Bulgarian International: Host: Sofia, Bulgaria; Level: International Challenge; Format: 32MS/32WS/32MD/32WD/32XD	(Russia) Vitalij Durkin (Russia) Nina Vislova	(Ukraine) Valeriy Atrashchenkov (Ukraine) Elena Prus
1 October	Bulgarian International: Host: Sofia, Bulgaria; Level: International Challenge; Format: 32MS/32WS/32MD/32WD/32XD	Score: 21–16, 21–10	
6 October	Bulgaria Open: Host: Sofia, Bulgaria; Level: Grand Prix; Format: 64MS/32WS/32MD/32WD/32XD	(Denmark) Joachim Persson	(Chinese Taipei) Hsieh Yu-hsin
6 October	Bulgaria Open: Host: Sofia, Bulgaria; Level: Grand Prix; Format: 64MS/32WS/32MD/32WD/32XD	Score: 17–21, 21–19, 21–19	
6 October	Bulgaria Open: Host: Sofia, Bulgaria; Level: Grand Prix; Format: 64MS/32WS/32MD/32WD/32XD	(Bulgaria) Petya Nedelcheva	(Indonesia) Rosaria Yusfin Pungkasari
6 October	Bulgaria Open: Host: Sofia, Bulgaria; Level: Grand Prix; Format: 64MS/32WS/32MD/32WD/32XD	Score: 21–14, 21–12	
6 October	Bulgaria Open: Host: Sofia, Bulgaria; Level: Grand Prix; Format: 64MS/32WS/32MD/32WD/32XD	(Denmark) Mathias Boe (Denmark) Carsten Mogensen	(Indonesia) Fran Kurniawan (Indonesia) Rendra Wijaya
6 October	Bulgaria Open: Host: Sofia, Bulgaria; Level: Grand Prix; Format: 64MS/32WS/32MD/32WD/32XD	Score: 25–23, 21–16	
6 October	Bulgaria Open: Host: Sofia, Bulgaria; Level: Grand Prix; Format: 64MS/32WS/32MD/32WD/32XD	(India) Jwala Gutta (India) Shruti Kurien	(Indonesia) Shendy Puspa Irawati (Indonesia) Meiliana Jauhari
6 October	Bulgaria Open: Host: Sofia, Bulgaria; Level: Grand Prix; Format: 64MS/32WS/32MD/32WD/32XD	Score: 21–11, 21–19	
6 October	Bulgaria Open: Host: Sofia, Bulgaria; Level: Grand Prix; Format: 64MS/32WS/32MD/32WD/32XD	(India) Valiyaveetil Diju (India) Jwala Gutta	(Indonesia) Fran Kurniawan (Indonesia) Shendy Puspa Irawati
6 October	Bulgaria Open: Host: Sofia, Bulgaria; Level: Grand Prix; Format: 64MS/32WS/32MD/32WD/32XD	Score: 15–21, 21–18, 21–19	
6 October	Cyprus International: Host: Nicosia, Cyprus; Level: International Series; Format: 32MS/32WS/16MD/16WD/16XD	(Denmark) Kasper Ipsen	(Denmark) Emil Vind
6 October	Cyprus International: Host: Nicosia, Cyprus; Level: International Series; Format: 32MS/32WS/16MD/16WD/16XD	Score: 21–10, 21–12	
6 October	Cyprus International: Host: Nicosia, Cyprus; Level: International Series; Format: 32MS/32WS/16MD/16WD/16XD	(Denmark) Camilla Overgaard	(England) Solenn Pasturel
6 October	Cyprus International: Host: Nicosia, Cyprus; Level: International Series; Format: 32MS/32WS/16MD/16WD/16XD	Score: 19–21, 21–15, 21–17	
6 October	Cyprus International: Host: Nicosia, Cyprus; Level: International Series; Format: 32MS/32WS/16MD/16WD/16XD	(Iceland) Magnús Ingi Helgason (Iceland) Helgi Jóhannesson	(Denmark) Martin Baatz Olsen (Denmark) Thomas Fynbo
6 October	Cyprus International: Host: Nicosia, Cyprus; Level: International Series; Format: 32MS/32WS/16MD/16WD/16XD	Score: 21–18, 21–16	
6 October	Cyprus International: Host: Nicosia, Cyprus; Level: International Series; Format: 32MS/32WS/16MD/16WD/16XD	(Denmark) Maria Helsbøl (Denmark) Anne Skelbæk	(Poland) Natalia Pocztowiak (Poland) Aleksandra Wałaszek
6 October	Cyprus International: Host: Nicosia, Cyprus; Level: International Series; Format: 32MS/32WS/16MD/16WD/16XD	Score: 21–12, 21–17	
6 October	Cyprus International: Host: Nicosia, Cyprus; Level: International Series; Format: 32MS/32WS/16MD/16WD/16XD	(Denmark) Peter Mørk (Denmark) Maria Helsbøl	(Denmark) Niklas Hoff (Denmark) Anne Skelbæk
6 October	Cyprus International: Host: Nicosia, Cyprus; Level: International Series; Format: 32MS/32WS/16MD/16WD/16XD	Score: 21–14, 15–21, 26–24	
6 October	Brazil International: Host: São Paulo, Brazil; Level: Future Series; Format: 64MS/32WS/32MD/16WD/32XD	(Guatemala) Kevin Cordón	(Peru) Andrés Corpancho
6 October	Brazil International: Host: São Paulo, Brazil; Level: Future Series; Format: 64MS/32WS/32MD/16WD/32XD	Score: 21–15, 21–14	
6 October	Brazil International: Host: São Paulo, Brazil; Level: Future Series; Format: 64MS/32WS/32MD/16WD/32XD	(Peru) Cristina Aicardi	(Peru) Alejandra Monteverde
6 October	Brazil International: Host: São Paulo, Brazil; Level: Future Series; Format: 64MS/32WS/32MD/16WD/32XD	Score: 21–18, 21–10	
6 October	Brazil International: Host: São Paulo, Brazil; Level: Future Series; Format: 64MS/32WS/32MD/16WD/32XD	(Peru) Andrés Corpancho (Peru) Bruno Monteverde	(Brazil) Lucas Araújo (Brazil) Paulo von Scala
6 October	Brazil International: Host: São Paulo, Brazil; Level: Future Series; Format: 64MS/32WS/32MD/16WD/32XD	Score: 21–16, 21–14	
6 October	Brazil International: Host: São Paulo, Brazil; Level: Future Series; Format: 64MS/32WS/32MD/16WD/32XD	(Peru) Cristina Aicardi (Peru) Alejandra Monteverde	(Peru) Katherine Winder (Peru) Claudia Zornoza
6 October	Brazil International: Host: São Paulo, Brazil; Level: Future Series; Format: 64MS/32WS/32MD/16WD/32XD	Score: 23–21, 21–17	
6 October	Brazil International: Host: São Paulo, Brazil; Level: Future Series; Format: 64MS/32WS/32MD/16WD/32XD	(Peru) Bruno Monteverde (Peru) Claudia Zornoza	(Brazil) Lucas Araújo (Brazil) Roberta Angi
6 October	Brazil International: Host: São Paulo, Brazil; Level: Future Series; Format: 64MS/32WS/32MD/16WD/32XD	Score: 21–16, 21–16	
October 13	Syria International: Host: Damascus, Syria; Level: International Series; Format: 64MS/32WS/32MD/16WD/16XD	(Iran) Mohammad Reza Kheradmandi	(Iran) Ali Shahhosseini
October 13	Syria International: Host: Damascus, Syria; Level: International Series; Format: 64MS/32WS/32MD/16WD/16XD	Score: 21–18, 21–14	
October 13	Syria International: Host: Damascus, Syria; Level: International Series; Format: 64MS/32WS/32MD/16WD/16XD	(India) Sayali Gokhale	(India) Sampada Sahastrabuddhe
October 13	Syria International: Host: Damascus, Syria; Level: International Series; Format: 64MS/32WS/32MD/16WD/16XD	Score: 21–11, 21–17	
October 13	Syria International: Host: Damascus, Syria; Level: International Series; Format: 64MS/32WS/32MD/16WD/16XD	(Iran) Mohammad Reza Kheradmandi (Iran) Ali Shahhosseini	(Pakistan) Mohammad Attique (Pakistan) Rizwan Azam
October 13	Syria International: Host: Damascus, Syria; Level: International Series; Format: 64MS/32WS/32MD/16WD/16XD	Score: 21–19, 21–18	
October 13	Syria International: Host: Damascus, Syria; Level: International Series; Format: 64MS/32WS/32MD/16WD/16XD	(Iran) Negin Amiripour (Iran) Sahar Zamanian	(Egypt) Hadia Hosny (Iran) Sabereh Kabiri
October 13	Syria International: Host: Damascus, Syria; Level: International Series; Format: 64MS/32WS/32MD/16WD/16XD	Score: 21–16, 21–15	
October 13	Syria International: Host: Damascus, Syria; Level: International Series; Format: 64MS/32WS/32MD/16WD/16XD	(Pakistan) Mohammad Attique (Pakistan) Isha Akram	(India) Rohan Castelino (Syria) Hadil Kareem
October 13	Syria International: Host: Damascus, Syria; Level: International Series; Format: 64MS/32WS/32MD/16WD/16XD	Score: 13–21, 21–18, 21–17	
October 13	Dutch Open: Host: Almere, Netherlands; Level: Grand Prix; Format: 64MS/32WS/32MD/32WD/32XD	(Indonesia) Andre Kurniawan Tedjono	(India) Chetan Anand
October 13	Dutch Open: Host: Almere, Netherlands; Level: Grand Prix; Format: 64MS/32WS/32MD/32WD/32XD	Score: 21–15, 11–21, 21–19	
October 13	Dutch Open: Host: Almere, Netherlands; Level: Grand Prix; Format: 64MS/32WS/32MD/32WD/32XD	(Netherlands) Yao Jie	(Bulgaria) Linda Zetchiri
October 13	Dutch Open: Host: Almere, Netherlands; Level: Grand Prix; Format: 64MS/32WS/32MD/32WD/32XD	Score: 21–14, 21–13	
October 13	Dutch Open: Host: Almere, Netherlands; Level: Grand Prix; Format: 64MS/32WS/32MD/32WD/32XD	(Indonesia) Fran Kurniawan (England) Rendra Wijaya	(India) Rupesh Kumar (India) Sanave Thomas
October 13	Dutch Open: Host: Almere, Netherlands; Level: Grand Prix; Format: 64MS/32WS/32MD/32WD/32XD	Score: 21–18, 21–18	
October 13	Dutch Open: Host: Almere, Netherlands; Level: Grand Prix; Format: 64MS/32WS/32MD/32WD/32XD	(Denmark) Lena Frier Kristiansen (Denmark) Kamilla Rytter Juhl	(Indonesia) Shendy Puspa Irawati (Indonesia) Meiliana Jauhari
October 13	Dutch Open: Host: Almere, Netherlands; Level: Grand Prix; Format: 64MS/32WS/32MD/32WD/32XD	Score: 21–16, 25–23	
October 13	Dutch Open: Host: Almere, Netherlands; Level: Grand Prix; Format: 64MS/32WS/32MD/32WD/32XD	(Denmark) Joachim Fischer Nielsen (Denmark) Christinna Pedersen	(Indonesia) Fran Kurniawan (Indonesia) Shendy Puspa Irawati
October 13	Dutch Open: Host: Almere, Netherlands; Level: Grand Prix; Format: 64MS/32WS/32MD/32WD/32XD	Score: 21–17, 21–9	
October 13	Slovak Open: Host: Prešov, Slovakia; Level: Future Series; Format: 32MS/32WS/32MD/16WD/32XD	(Ukraine) Valeriy Atrashchenkov	(Denmark) Martin Delfs
October 13	Slovak Open: Host: Prešov, Slovakia; Level: Future Series; Format: 32MS/32WS/32MD/16WD/32XD	Score: 21–18, 21–16	
October 13	Slovak Open: Host: Prešov, Slovakia; Level: Future Series; Format: 32MS/32WS/32MD/16WD/32XD	(Ukraine) Elena Prus	(Denmark) Laerke Folsted
October 13	Slovak Open: Host: Prešov, Slovakia; Level: Future Series; Format: 32MS/32WS/32MD/16WD/32XD	Score: 21–16, 21–17	
October 13	Slovak Open: Host: Prešov, Slovakia; Level: Future Series; Format: 32MS/32WS/32MD/16WD/32XD	(Iceland) Magnús Ingi Helgason (Iceland) Helgi Jóhannesson	(Czech Republic) Jakub Bitman (Croatia) Zvonimir Đurkinjak
October 13	Slovak Open: Host: Prešov, Slovakia; Level: Future Series; Format: 32MS/32WS/32MD/16WD/32XD	Score: 21–11, 21–14	
October 13	Slovak Open: Host: Prešov, Slovakia; Level: Future Series; Format: 32MS/32WS/32MD/16WD/32XD	(Republic of Ireland) Chloe Magee (Republic of Ireland) Bing Huang	(Poland) Anna Narel (Poland) Natalia Pocztowiak
October 13	Slovak Open: Host: Prešov, Slovakia; Level: Future Series; Format: 32MS/32WS/32MD/16WD/32XD	Score: 21–8, 21–13	
October 13	Slovak Open: Host: Prešov, Slovakia; Level: Future Series; Format: 32MS/32WS/32MD/16WD/32XD	(Ukraine) Valeriy Atrashchenkov (Ukraine) Elena Prus	(Ukraine) Dmytro Zavadsky (Ukraine) Mariya Diptan
October 13	Slovak Open: Host: Prešov, Slovakia; Level: Future Series; Format: 32MS/32WS/32MD/16WD/32XD	Score: 21–19, 21–14	
20 October	Denmark Open (Draw): Host: Odense, Denmark; Level: Superseries; Format: 32MS/32WS/32MD/32WD/32XD	(Denmark) Peter Gade	(Denmark) Joachim Persson
20 October	Denmark Open (Draw): Host: Odense, Denmark; Level: Superseries; Format: 32MS/32WS/32MD/32WD/32XD	Score: 21–18, 17–21, 21–14	
20 October	Denmark Open (Draw): Host: Odense, Denmark; Level: Superseries; Format: 32MS/32WS/32MD/32WD/32XD	(China) Wang Lin	(Hong Kong) Zhou Mi
20 October	Denmark Open (Draw): Host: Odense, Denmark; Level: Superseries; Format: 32MS/32WS/32MD/32WD/32XD	Score: 21–18, 21–10	
20 October	Denmark Open (Draw): Host: Odense, Denmark; Level: Superseries; Format: 32MS/32WS/32MD/32WD/32XD	(Indonesia) Markis Kido (Indonesia) Hendra Setiawan	(China) Fu Haifeng (China) Shen Ye
20 October	Denmark Open (Draw): Host: Odense, Denmark; Level: Superseries; Format: 32MS/32WS/32MD/32WD/32XD	Score: 21–18, 21–19	
20 October	Denmark Open (Draw): Host: Odense, Denmark; Level: Superseries; Format: 32MS/32WS/32MD/32WD/32XD	(Malaysia) Chin Eei Hui (Malaysia) Wong Pei Tty	(Indonesia) Rani Mundiasti (Indonesia) Jo Novita
20 October	Denmark Open (Draw): Host: Odense, Denmark; Level: Superseries; Format: 32MS/32WS/32MD/32WD/32XD	Score: 23–21, 21–12	
20 October	Denmark Open (Draw): Host: Odense, Denmark; Level: Superseries; Format: 32MS/32WS/32MD/32WD/32XD	(Denmark) Joachim Fischer Nielsen (Denmark) Christinna Pedersen	(Denmark) Thomas Laybourn (Denmark) Kamilla Rytter Juhl
20 October	Denmark Open (Draw): Host: Odense, Denmark; Level: Superseries; Format: 32MS/32WS/32MD/32WD/32XD	Score: 21–14, 21–17	
20 October	BWF World Junior Championships (Draw): Host: Pune, India; Level: Suhandinata & Bimantara Cup; Format: 21XT/128MS/128WS/64MD/64WD/128XD	China	South Korea
20 October	BWF World Junior Championships (Draw): Host: Pune, India; Level: Suhandinata & Bimantara Cup; Format: 21XT/128MS/128WS/64MD/64WD/128XD	Score: 3-1	
20 October	BWF World Junior Championships (Draw): Host: Pune, India; Level: Suhandinata & Bimantara Cup; Format: 21XT/128MS/128WS/64MD/64WD/128XD	(China) Wang Zhengming	(China) Gao Huan
20 October	BWF World Junior Championships (Draw): Host: Pune, India; Level: Suhandinata & Bimantara Cup; Format: 21XT/128MS/128WS/64MD/64WD/128XD	Score: 21–13, 21–16	
20 October	BWF World Junior Championships (Draw): Host: Pune, India; Level: Suhandinata & Bimantara Cup; Format: 21XT/128MS/128WS/64MD/64WD/128XD	(India) Saina Nehwal	(Japan) Sayaka Sato
20 October	BWF World Junior Championships (Draw): Host: Pune, India; Level: Suhandinata & Bimantara Cup; Format: 21XT/128MS/128WS/64MD/64WD/128XD	Score: 21–9, 21–18	
20 October	BWF World Junior Championships (Draw): Host: Pune, India; Level: Suhandinata & Bimantara Cup; Format: 21XT/128MS/128WS/64MD/64WD/128XD	(Malaysia) Mak Hee Chun (Malaysia) Teo Kok Siang	(China) Chai Biao (China) Qiu Zihan
20 October	BWF World Junior Championships (Draw): Host: Pune, India; Level: Suhandinata & Bimantara Cup; Format: 21XT/128MS/128WS/64MD/64WD/128XD	Score: 21–18, 21–14	
20 October	BWF World Junior Championships (Draw): Host: Pune, India; Level: Suhandinata & Bimantara Cup; Format: 21XT/128MS/128WS/64MD/64WD/128XD	(Singapore) Fu Mingtian (Singapore) Yao Lei	(China) Xie Jing (China) Zhong Qianxin
20 October	BWF World Junior Championships (Draw): Host: Pune, India; Level: Suhandinata & Bimantara Cup; Format: 21XT/128MS/128WS/64MD/64WD/128XD	Score: 21–19, 21–17	
20 October	BWF World Junior Championships (Draw): Host: Pune, India; Level: Suhandinata & Bimantara Cup; Format: 21XT/128MS/128WS/64MD/64WD/128XD	(China) Chai Biao (China) Xie Jing	(China) Zhang Nan (China) Lu Lu
20 October	BWF World Junior Championships (Draw): Host: Pune, India; Level: Suhandinata & Bimantara Cup; Format: 21XT/128MS/128WS/64MD/64WD/128XD	Score: 21–19, 21–15	
27 October	French Open (Draw): Host: Paris, France; Level: Superseries; Format: 32MS/32WS/32MD/32WD/32XD	(Denmark) Peter Gade	(Indonesia) Taufik Hidayat
27 October	French Open (Draw): Host: Paris, France; Level: Superseries; Format: 32MS/32WS/32MD/32WD/32XD	Score: 16–21, 21–17, 21–7	
27 October	French Open (Draw): Host: Paris, France; Level: Superseries; Format: 32MS/32WS/32MD/32WD/32XD	(China) Wang Lin	(China) Xie Xingfang
27 October	French Open (Draw): Host: Paris, France; Level: Superseries; Format: 32MS/32WS/32MD/32WD/32XD	Score: 21–18, 13–21, 21–11	
27 October	French Open (Draw): Host: Paris, France; Level: Superseries; Format: 32MS/32WS/32MD/32WD/32XD	(Indonesia) Markis Kido (Indonesia) Hendra Setiawan	(China) Cai Yun (China) Xu Chen
27 October	French Open (Draw): Host: Paris, France; Level: Superseries; Format: 32MS/32WS/32MD/32WD/32XD	Score: 21–15, 21–12	
27 October	French Open (Draw): Host: Paris, France; Level: Superseries; Format: 32MS/32WS/32MD/32WD/32XD	(China) Du Jing (China) Yu Yang	(Malaysia) Chin Eei Hui (Malaysia) Wong Pei Tty
27 October	French Open (Draw): Host: Paris, France; Level: Superseries; Format: 32MS/32WS/32MD/32WD/32XD	Score: 20–22, 21–19, 21–11	
27 October	French Open (Draw): Host: Paris, France; Level: Superseries; Format: 32MS/32WS/32MD/32WD/32XD	(China) He Hanbin (China) Yu Yang	(England) Anthony Clark (England) Donna Kellogg
27 October	French Open (Draw): Host: Paris, France; Level: Superseries; Format: 32MS/32WS/32MD/32WD/32XD	Score: 21–13, 21–19	
27 October	Hungarian International: Host: Budapest, Hungary; Level: International Series; Format: 32MS/32WS/32MD/32WD/32XD	(India) Anand Pawar	(Denmark) Martin Delfs
27 October	Hungarian International: Host: Budapest, Hungary; Level: International Series; Format: 32MS/32WS/32MD/32WD/32XD	Score: 22–20, 12–21, 21–12	
27 October	Hungarian International: Host: Budapest, Hungary; Level: International Series; Format: 32MS/32WS/32MD/32WD/32XD	(Bulgaria) Petya Nedelcheva	(Slovenia) Maja Tvrdy
27 October	Hungarian International: Host: Budapest, Hungary; Level: International Series; Format: 32MS/32WS/32MD/32WD/32XD	Score: 21–11, 21–8	
27 October	Hungarian International: Host: Budapest, Hungary; Level: International Series; Format: 32MS/32WS/32MD/32WD/32XD	(Denmark) Kasper Henriksen (Denmark) Christian Skovgaard	(Germany) Maurice Niesner (Germany) Till Zander
27 October	Hungarian International: Host: Budapest, Hungary; Level: International Series; Format: 32MS/32WS/32MD/32WD/32XD	Score: 21–12, 21–12	
27 October	Hungarian International: Host: Budapest, Hungary; Level: International Series; Format: 32MS/32WS/32MD/32WD/32XD	(Russia) Anastasia Prokopenko (Russia) Olga Golovanova	(Bulgaria) Petya Nedelcheva (Bulgaria) Dimitria Popstoikova
27 October	Hungarian International: Host: Budapest, Hungary; Level: International Series; Format: 32MS/32WS/32MD/32WD/32XD	Score: 21–12, 10–21, 21–12	
27 October	Hungarian International: Host: Budapest, Hungary; Level: International Series; Format: 32MS/32WS/32MD/32WD/32XD	(Russia) Vitalij Durkin (Russia) Nina Vislova	(Russia) Ivan Sozonov (Russia) Anastasia Prokopenko
27 October	Hungarian International: Host: Budapest, Hungary; Level: International Series; Format: 32MS/32WS/32MD/32WD/32XD	Score: 21–11, 21–19	

=== November ===
Week of	Tournament	Champions	Runners-up
3 November	Russian Open: Host: Moscow, Russia; Level: Grand Prix; Format: 64MS/32WS/32MD/32WD/32XD	(Netherlands) Dicky Palyama	(Russia) Stanislav Pukhov
3 November	Russian Open: Host: Moscow, Russia; Level: Grand Prix; Format: 64MS/32WS/32MD/32WD/32XD	Score: 21–12, 21–18	
3 November	Russian Open: Host: Moscow, Russia; Level: Grand Prix; Format: 64MS/32WS/32MD/32WD/32XD	(Russia) Ella Diehl	(Ukraine) Larisa Griga
3 November	Russian Open: Host: Moscow, Russia; Level: Grand Prix; Format: 64MS/32WS/32MD/32WD/32XD	Score: 21–10, 17–21, 21–12	
3 November	Russian Open: Host: Moscow, Russia; Level: Grand Prix; Format: 64MS/32WS/32MD/32WD/32XD	(Russia) Vitalij Durkin (Russia) Aleksandr Nikolaenko	(Russia) Vladimir Ivanov (Russia) Ivan Sozonov
3 November	Russian Open: Host: Moscow, Russia; Level: Grand Prix; Format: 64MS/32WS/32MD/32WD/32XD	Score: 21–11, 21–15	
3 November	Russian Open: Host: Moscow, Russia; Level: Grand Prix; Format: 64MS/32WS/32MD/32WD/32XD	(Russia) Valeria Sorokina (Russia) Nina Vislova	(Bulgaria) Petya Nedelcheva (Bulgaria) Dimitria Popstoykova
3 November	Russian Open: Host: Moscow, Russia; Level: Grand Prix; Format: 64MS/32WS/32MD/32WD/32XD	Score: 21–18, 21–8	
3 November	Russian Open: Host: Moscow, Russia; Level: Grand Prix; Format: 64MS/32WS/32MD/32WD/32XD	(Russia) Aleksandr Nikolaenko (Russia) Valeria Sorokina	(Russia) Vitalij Durkin (Russia) Nina Vislova
3 November	Russian Open: Host: Moscow, Russia; Level: Grand Prix; Format: 64MS/32WS/32MD/32WD/32XD	Score: 21–19, 21–19	
3 November	Puerto Rico International: Host: San Juan, Puerto Rico; Level: International Series; Format: 64MS/16WS/16MD/8WD/16XD	(Guatemala) Kevin Cordón	(Iran) Kaveh Mehrabi
3 November	Puerto Rico International: Host: San Juan, Puerto Rico; Level: International Series; Format: 64MS/16WS/16MD/8WD/16XD	Score: 21–13, 21–9	
3 November	Puerto Rico International: Host: San Juan, Puerto Rico; Level: International Series; Format: 64MS/16WS/16MD/8WD/16XD	(Mexico) Victoria Montero	(Peru) Alejandra Monteverde
3 November	Puerto Rico International: Host: San Juan, Puerto Rico; Level: International Series; Format: 64MS/16WS/16MD/8WD/16XD	Score: 21–13, 15–21, 21–18	
3 November	Puerto Rico International: Host: San Juan, Puerto Rico; Level: International Series; Format: 64MS/16WS/16MD/8WD/16XD	(Peru) Antonio de Vinatea (Peru) Martín del Valle	(Mexico) Jesus Aguilar (Mexico) Salvador Sánchez
3 November	Puerto Rico International: Host: San Juan, Puerto Rico; Level: International Series; Format: 64MS/16WS/16MD/8WD/16XD	Score: 21–14, 21–17	
3 November	Puerto Rico International: Host: San Juan, Puerto Rico; Level: International Series; Format: 64MS/16WS/16MD/8WD/16XD	(Peru) Claudia Zornoza (Peru) Katherine Winder	(Peru) Cristina Aicardi (Peru) Alejandra Monteverde
3 November	Puerto Rico International: Host: San Juan, Puerto Rico; Level: International Series; Format: 64MS/16WS/16MD/8WD/16XD	Score: 21–11, 16–21, 21–16	
3 November	Puerto Rico International: Host: San Juan, Puerto Rico; Level: International Series; Format: 64MS/16WS/16MD/8WD/16XD	(Peru) Andrés Corpancho (Peru) Katherine Winder	(Mexico) Jesus Aguilar (Mexico) Victoria Montero
3 November	Puerto Rico International: Host: San Juan, Puerto Rico; Level: International Series; Format: 64MS/16WS/16MD/8WD/16XD	Score: 21–10, 21–10	
November 10	New Zealand Open: Host: Auckland, New Zealand; Level: Grand Prix; Format: 32MS/16WS/16MD/16WD/32XD	(Malaysia) Lee Tsuen Seng	(Malaysia) Sairul Amar Ayob
November 10	New Zealand Open: Host: Auckland, New Zealand; Level: Grand Prix; Format: 32MS/16WS/16MD/16WD/32XD	Score: 24–22, 21–17	
November 10	New Zealand Open: Host: Auckland, New Zealand; Level: Grand Prix; Format: 32MS/16WS/16MD/16WD/32XD	(Hong Kong) Zhou Mi	(New Zealand) Rachel Hindley
November 10	New Zealand Open: Host: Auckland, New Zealand; Level: Grand Prix; Format: 32MS/16WS/16MD/16WD/32XD	Score: 21–10, 21–15	
November 10	New Zealand Open: Host: Auckland, New Zealand; Level: Grand Prix; Format: 32MS/16WS/16MD/16WD/32XD	(Chinese Taipei) Chen Hung-ling (Chinese Taipei) Lin Yu-lang	(Indonesia) Fernando Kurniawan (Indonesia) Lingga Lie
November 10	New Zealand Open: Host: Auckland, New Zealand; Level: Grand Prix; Format: 32MS/16WS/16MD/16WD/32XD	Score: 22–20, 21–10	
November 10	New Zealand Open: Host: Auckland, New Zealand; Level: Grand Prix; Format: 32MS/16WS/16MD/16WD/32XD	(Chinese Taipei) Chien Yu-chin (Chinese Taipei) Chou Chia-chi	(Malaysia) Haw Chiou Hwee (Malaysia) Lim Pek Siah
November 10	New Zealand Open: Host: Auckland, New Zealand; Level: Grand Prix; Format: 32MS/16WS/16MD/16WD/32XD	Score: 21–8, 21–15	
November 10	New Zealand Open: Host: Auckland, New Zealand; Level: Grand Prix; Format: 32MS/16WS/16MD/16WD/32XD	(Chinese Taipei) Chen Hung-ling (Chinese Taipei) Chou Chia-chi	(Chinese Taipei) Hsieh Yu-hsin (Chinese Taipei) Chien Yu-chin
November 10	New Zealand Open: Host: Auckland, New Zealand; Level: Grand Prix; Format: 32MS/16WS/16MD/16WD/32XD	Score: 21–18, 22–20	
November 10	Norwegian International: Host: Oslo, Norway; Level: International Challenge; Format: 32MS/32WS/32MD/16WD/32XD	(Finland) Ville Lång	(Sweden) Henri Hurskainen
November 10	Norwegian International: Host: Oslo, Norway; Level: International Challenge; Format: 32MS/32WS/32MD/16WD/32XD	Score: 21–13, 21–8	
November 10	Norwegian International: Host: Oslo, Norway; Level: International Challenge; Format: 32MS/32WS/32MD/16WD/32XD	(China) Zhang Xi	(Ukraine) Larisa Griga
November 10	Norwegian International: Host: Oslo, Norway; Level: International Challenge; Format: 32MS/32WS/32MD/16WD/32XD	Score: 21–18, 21–15	
November 10	Norwegian International: Host: Oslo, Norway; Level: International Challenge; Format: 32MS/32WS/32MD/16WD/32XD	(Germany) Michael Fuchs (Germany) Ingo Kindervater	(Netherlands) Ruud Bosch (Netherlands) Koen Ridder
November 10	Norwegian International: Host: Oslo, Norway; Level: International Challenge; Format: 32MS/32WS/32MD/16WD/32XD	Score: 21–18, 19–21, 21–8	
November 10	Norwegian International: Host: Oslo, Norway; Level: International Challenge; Format: 32MS/32WS/32MD/16WD/32XD	(Russia) Anastasia Russkikh (Russia) Irina Khlebko	(Sweden) Emelie Lennartsson (Sweden) Emma Wengberg
November 10	Norwegian International: Host: Oslo, Norway; Level: International Challenge; Format: 32MS/32WS/32MD/16WD/32XD	Score: 21–18, 21–23, 21–16	
November 10	Norwegian International: Host: Oslo, Norway; Level: International Challenge; Format: 32MS/32WS/32MD/16WD/32XD	(Germany) Michael Fuchs (Germany) Annekatrin Lillie	(Germany) Till Zander (Germany) Gitte Köhler
November 10	Norwegian International: Host: Oslo, Norway; Level: International Challenge; Format: 32MS/32WS/32MD/16WD/32XD	Score: 23–21, 21–12	
17 November	Malaysia International: Host: Kota Kinabalu, Malaysia; Level: International Challenge; Format: 64MS/32WS/32MD/32WD/32XD	(Malaysia) Kuan Beng Hong	(Malaysia) Chong Wei Feng
17 November	Malaysia International: Host: Kota Kinabalu, Malaysia; Level: International Challenge; Format: 64MS/32WS/32MD/32WD/32XD	Score: 21–7, 21–15	
17 November	Malaysia International: Host: Kota Kinabalu, Malaysia; Level: International Challenge; Format: 64MS/32WS/32MD/32WD/32XD	(Indonesia) Febby Angguni	(South Korea) Bae Seung-hee
17 November	Malaysia International: Host: Kota Kinabalu, Malaysia; Level: International Challenge; Format: 64MS/32WS/32MD/32WD/32XD	Score: 22–20, 21–17	
17 November	Malaysia International: Host: Kota Kinabalu, Malaysia; Level: International Challenge; Format: 64MS/32WS/32MD/32WD/32XD	(Malaysia) Lin Woon Fui (Malaysia) Goh Wei Shem	(Malaysia) Ong Jian Guo (Malaysia) Gan Teik Chai
17 November	Malaysia International: Host: Kota Kinabalu, Malaysia; Level: International Challenge; Format: 64MS/32WS/32MD/32WD/32XD	Score: 21–19, 21–18	
17 November	Malaysia International: Host: Kota Kinabalu, Malaysia; Level: International Challenge; Format: 64MS/32WS/32MD/32WD/32XD	(South Korea) Bae Seung-hee (South Korea) Park Sun-young	(South Korea) Kim Mi-young (South Korea) Jang Ye-na
17 November	Malaysia International: Host: Kota Kinabalu, Malaysia; Level: International Challenge; Format: 64MS/32WS/32MD/32WD/32XD	Score: 13–21, 21–15, 21–5	
17 November	Malaysia International: Host: Kota Kinabalu, Malaysia; Level: International Challenge; Format: 64MS/32WS/32MD/32WD/32XD	(Malaysia) Mohd Lutfi Zaim Abdul Khalid (Malaysia) Lim Yin Loo	(Singapore) Danny Bawa Chrisnanta (Singapore) Vanessa Neo
17 November	Malaysia International: Host: Kota Kinabalu, Malaysia; Level: International Challenge; Format: 64MS/32WS/32MD/32WD/32XD	Score: 14–21, 21–17, 21–19	
17 November	China Open (Draw): Host: Shanghai, China; Level: Superseries; Format: 32MS/32WS/32MD/32WD/32XD	(China) Lin Dan	(Malaysia) Lee Chong Wei
17 November	China Open (Draw): Host: Shanghai, China; Level: Superseries; Format: 32MS/32WS/32MD/32WD/32XD	Score: 21–18, 21–9	
17 November	China Open (Draw): Host: Shanghai, China; Level: Superseries; Format: 32MS/32WS/32MD/32WD/32XD	(China) Jiang Yanjiao	(China) Zhu Jingjing
17 November	China Open (Draw): Host: Shanghai, China; Level: Superseries; Format: 32MS/32WS/32MD/32WD/32XD	Score: 21–15, 21–13	
17 November	China Open (Draw): Host: Shanghai, China; Level: Superseries; Format: 32MS/32WS/32MD/32WD/32XD	(South Korea) Jung Jae-sung (South Korea) Lee Yong-dae	(Denmark) Mathias Boe (Denmark) Carsten Mogensen
17 November	China Open (Draw): Host: Shanghai, China; Level: Superseries; Format: 32MS/32WS/32MD/32WD/32XD	Score: 17–21, 21–17, 21–13	
17 November	China Open (Draw): Host: Shanghai, China; Level: Superseries; Format: 32MS/32WS/32MD/32WD/32XD	(China) Zhang Yawen (China) Zhao Tingting	(Malaysia) Chin Eei Hui (Malaysia) Wong Pei Tty
17 November	China Open (Draw): Host: Shanghai, China; Level: Superseries; Format: 32MS/32WS/32MD/32WD/32XD	Score: 21–14, 21–19	
17 November	China Open (Draw): Host: Shanghai, China; Level: Superseries; Format: 32MS/32WS/32MD/32WD/32XD	(South Korea) Lee Yong-dae (South Korea) Lee Hyo-jung	(China) Xu Chen (China) Zhao Yunlei
17 November	China Open (Draw): Host: Shanghai, China; Level: Superseries; Format: 32MS/32WS/32MD/32WD/32XD	Score: 21–16, 21–15	
17 November	Scotland International: Host: Glasgow, Scotland; Level: International Challenge; Format: 64MS/64WS/32MD/32WD/32XD	(England) Rajiv Ouseph	(India) Anand Pawar
17 November	Scotland International: Host: Glasgow, Scotland; Level: International Challenge; Format: 64MS/64WS/32MD/32WD/32XD	Score: 21–17, 21–8	
17 November	Scotland International: Host: Glasgow, Scotland; Level: International Challenge; Format: 64MS/64WS/32MD/32WD/32XD	(England) Elizabeth Cann	(Estonia) Kati Tolmoff
17 November	Scotland International: Host: Glasgow, Scotland; Level: International Challenge; Format: 64MS/64WS/32MD/32WD/32XD	Score: 16–21, 21–10, 21–12	
17 November	Scotland International: Host: Glasgow, Scotland; Level: International Challenge; Format: 64MS/64WS/32MD/32WD/32XD	(England) Richard Eidestedt (England) Andrew Ellis	(England) Chris Langridge (England) David Lindley
17 November	Scotland International: Host: Glasgow, Scotland; Level: International Challenge; Format: 64MS/64WS/32MD/32WD/32XD	Score: 21–19, 16–21, 21–16	
17 November	Scotland International: Host: Glasgow, Scotland; Level: International Challenge; Format: 64MS/64WS/32MD/32WD/32XD	(England) Mariana Agathangelou (Scotland) Jillie Cooper	(Sweden) Emelie Lennartsson (Sweden) Emma Wengberg
17 November	Scotland International: Host: Glasgow, Scotland; Level: International Challenge; Format: 64MS/64WS/32MD/32WD/32XD	Score: 21–17, 21–13	
17 November	Scotland International: Host: Glasgow, Scotland; Level: International Challenge; Format: 64MS/64WS/32MD/32WD/32XD	(Germany) Michael Fuchs (Germany) Annekatrin Lillie	(England) Robert Adcock (England) Heather Olver
17 November	Scotland International: Host: Glasgow, Scotland; Level: International Challenge; Format: 64MS/64WS/32MD/32WD/32XD	Score: 21–16, 21–12	
17 November	Suriname International: Host: Paramaribo, Suriname; Level: Future Series; Format: 16MS/16WS/8MD/8WD/16XD	(Suriname) Virgil Soeroredjo	(Suriname) Mitchel Wongsodikromo
17 November	Suriname International: Host: Paramaribo, Suriname; Level: Future Series; Format: 16MS/16WS/8MD/8WD/16XD	Score: 10–21, 21–13, 21–10	
17 November	Suriname International: Host: Paramaribo, Suriname; Level: Future Series; Format: 16MS/16WS/8MD/8WD/16XD	(Barbados) Shari Watson	(Netherlands Antilles) Milangela Plate
17 November	Suriname International: Host: Paramaribo, Suriname; Level: Future Series; Format: 16MS/16WS/8MD/8WD/16XD	Score: 21–19, 21–17	
17 November	Suriname International: Host: Paramaribo, Suriname; Level: Future Series; Format: 16MS/16WS/8MD/8WD/16XD	(Suriname) Virgil Soeroredjo (Suriname) Mitchel Wongsodikromo	(Suriname) Dylan Darmohoetomo (Suriname) Irfan Djabar
17 November	Suriname International: Host: Paramaribo, Suriname; Level: Future Series; Format: 16MS/16WS/8MD/8WD/16XD	Score: 21–15, 21–15	
17 November	Suriname International: Host: Paramaribo, Suriname; Level: Future Series; Format: 16MS/16WS/8MD/8WD/16XD	(Suriname) Nathalie Haynes (Suriname) Danielle Melchiot	(Suriname) Crystal Leefmans (Suriname) Quennie Pawirosemito
17 November	Suriname International: Host: Paramaribo, Suriname; Level: Future Series; Format: 16MS/16WS/8MD/8WD/16XD	Score: 21–13, 21–19	
17 November	Suriname International: Host: Paramaribo, Suriname; Level: Future Series; Format: 16MS/16WS/8MD/8WD/16XD	(Suriname) Virgil Soeroredjo (Suriname) Nathalie Haynes	(Suriname) Mitchel Wongsodikromo (Suriname) Jill Sjauw Mook
17 November	Suriname International: Host: Paramaribo, Suriname; Level: Future Series; Format: 16MS/16WS/8MD/8WD/16XD	Score: 21–16, 21–16	
24 November	Hong Kong Open (Draw): Host: Wan Chai, Hong Kong; Level: Superseries; Format: 32MS/32WS/32MD/32WD/32XD	(China) Chen Jin	(China) Lin Dan
24 November	Hong Kong Open (Draw): Host: Wan Chai, Hong Kong; Level: Superseries; Format: 32MS/32WS/32MD/32WD/32XD	Score: 21–9, 9–21, 21–17	
24 November	Hong Kong Open (Draw): Host: Wan Chai, Hong Kong; Level: Superseries; Format: 32MS/32WS/32MD/32WD/32XD	(Hong Kong) Wang Chen	(China) Xie Xingfang
24 November	Hong Kong Open (Draw): Host: Wan Chai, Hong Kong; Level: Superseries; Format: 32MS/32WS/32MD/32WD/32XD	Score: 21–16, 10–21, 21–10	
24 November	Hong Kong Open (Draw): Host: Wan Chai, Hong Kong; Level: Superseries; Format: 32MS/32WS/32MD/32WD/32XD	(South Korea) Jung Jae-sung (South Korea) Lee Yong-dae	(Malaysia) Mohd Zakry Abdul Latif (Malaysia) Mohd Fairuzizuan Mohd Tazari
24 November	Hong Kong Open (Draw): Host: Wan Chai, Hong Kong; Level: Superseries; Format: 32MS/32WS/32MD/32WD/32XD	Score: 25–23, 19–21, 22–20	
24 November	Hong Kong Open (Draw): Host: Wan Chai, Hong Kong; Level: Superseries; Format: 32MS/32WS/32MD/32WD/32XD	(China) Zhang Yawen (China) Zhao Tingting	(China) Cheng Shu (China) Zhao Yunlei
24 November	Hong Kong Open (Draw): Host: Wan Chai, Hong Kong; Level: Superseries; Format: 32MS/32WS/32MD/32WD/32XD	Score: 21–14, 21–13	
24 November	Hong Kong Open (Draw): Host: Wan Chai, Hong Kong; Level: Superseries; Format: 32MS/32WS/32MD/32WD/32XD	(China) Xie Zhongbo (China) Zhang Yawen	(South Korea) Lee Yong-dae (South Korea) Lee Hyo-jung
24 November	Hong Kong Open (Draw): Host: Wan Chai, Hong Kong; Level: Superseries; Format: 32MS/32WS/32MD/32WD/32XD	Score: 21–14, 21–16	
24 November	Welsh International: Host: Cardiff, Wales; Level: International Series; Format: 32MS/32WS/32MD/32WD/32XD	(France) Brice Leverdez	(Scotland) Kieran Merrilees
24 November	Welsh International: Host: Cardiff, Wales; Level: International Series; Format: 32MS/32WS/32MD/32WD/32XD	Score: 21–15, 18–21, 21–19	
24 November	Welsh International: Host: Cardiff, Wales; Level: International Series; Format: 32MS/32WS/32MD/32WD/32XD	(Estonia) Kati Tolmoff	(Netherlands) Rachel van Cutsen
24 November	Welsh International: Host: Cardiff, Wales; Level: International Series; Format: 32MS/32WS/32MD/32WD/32XD	Score: 22–20, 18–21, 21–13	
24 November	Welsh International: Host: Cardiff, Wales; Level: International Series; Format: 32MS/32WS/32MD/32WD/32XD	(Scotland) Andrew Bowman (Wales) Martyn Lewis	(Austria) Jürgen Koch (Austria) Peter Zauner
24 November	Welsh International: Host: Cardiff, Wales; Level: International Series; Format: 32MS/32WS/32MD/32WD/32XD	Score: 14–21, 21–15, 21–13	
24 November	Welsh International: Host: Cardiff, Wales; Level: International Series; Format: 32MS/32WS/32MD/32WD/32XD	(England) Mariana Agathangelou (Scotland) Jillie Cooper	(Netherlands) Ilse Vaessen (Netherlands) Rachel van Cutsen
24 November	Welsh International: Host: Cardiff, Wales; Level: International Series; Format: 32MS/32WS/32MD/32WD/32XD	Score: 17–21, 21–19, 21–16	
24 November	Welsh International: Host: Cardiff, Wales; Level: International Series; Format: 32MS/32WS/32MD/32WD/32XD	(Scotland) Watson Briggs (Scotland) Jillie Cooper	(Netherlands) Jorrit de Ruiter (Netherlands) Ilse Vaessen
24 November	Welsh International: Host: Cardiff, Wales; Level: International Series; Format: 32MS/32WS/32MD/32WD/32XD	Score: 21–19, 21–18	

=== December ===
Week of	Tournament	Champions	Runners-up
1 December	Bahrain International: Host: Kota Kinabalu, Bahrain; Level: International Challenge; Format: 64MS/16WS/32MD/16WD/16XD	(India) R. M. V. Gurusaidutt	(Indonesia) Andi Saputro Nugroho
1 December	Bahrain International: Host: Kota Kinabalu, Bahrain; Level: International Challenge; Format: 64MS/16WS/32MD/16WD/16XD	Score: 21–13, 22–20	
1 December	Bahrain International: Host: Kota Kinabalu, Bahrain; Level: International Challenge; Format: 64MS/16WS/32MD/16WD/16XD	(India) Trupti Murgunde	(India) Ashwini Ponnappa
1 December	Bahrain International: Host: Kota Kinabalu, Bahrain; Level: International Challenge; Format: 64MS/16WS/32MD/16WD/16XD	Score: 21–16, 21–13	
1 December	Bahrain International: Host: Kota Kinabalu, Bahrain; Level: International Challenge; Format: 64MS/16WS/32MD/16WD/16XD	(India) Akshay Dewalkar (India) Jishnu Sanyal	(Iran) Ali Shahhosseini (Iran) Mohammed Reza Kheradmandi
1 December	Bahrain International: Host: Kota Kinabalu, Bahrain; Level: International Challenge; Format: 64MS/16WS/32MD/16WD/16XD	Score: 14–21, 21–18, 21–11	
1 December	Bahrain International: Host: Kota Kinabalu, Bahrain; Level: International Challenge; Format: 64MS/16WS/32MD/16WD/16XD	(Canada) Charmaine Reid (Germany) Nicole Grether	(India) Aparna Balan (India) Sampada Sahasrabuddhe
1 December	Bahrain International: Host: Kota Kinabalu, Bahrain; Level: International Challenge; Format: 64MS/16WS/32MD/16WD/16XD	Score: 21–16, 21–13	
1 December	Bahrain International: Host: Kota Kinabalu, Bahrain; Level: International Challenge; Format: 64MS/16WS/32MD/16WD/16XD	(India) Arun Vishnu (India) Aparna Balan	(India) Valiyaveetil Diju (India) Trupti Murgunde
1 December	Bahrain International: Host: Kota Kinabalu, Bahrain; Level: International Challenge; Format: 64MS/16WS/32MD/16WD/16XD	Score: 17–21, 21–18, 21–19	
1 December	Vietnam Open: Host: Ho Chi Minh City, Vietnam; Level: Grand Prix; Format: 64MS/32WS/32MD/32WD/32XD	(Vietnam) Nguyễn Tiến Minh	(Hong Kong) Chan Yan Kit
1 December	Vietnam Open: Host: Ho Chi Minh City, Vietnam; Level: Grand Prix; Format: 64MS/32WS/32MD/32WD/32XD	Score: 24–22, 21–18	
1 December	Vietnam Open: Host: Ho Chi Minh City, Vietnam; Level: Grand Prix; Format: 64MS/32WS/32MD/32WD/32XD	(Singapore) Zhang Beiwen	(Singapore) Xing Aiying
1 December	Vietnam Open: Host: Ho Chi Minh City, Vietnam; Level: Grand Prix; Format: 64MS/32WS/32MD/32WD/32XD	Score: 11–21, 21–19, 22–20	
1 December	Vietnam Open: Host: Ho Chi Minh City, Vietnam; Level: Grand Prix; Format: 64MS/32WS/32MD/32WD/32XD	(Malaysia) Choong Tan Fook (Malaysia) Lee Wan Wah	(Indonesia) Fran Kurniawan (Indonesia) Rendra Wijaya
1 December	Vietnam Open: Host: Ho Chi Minh City, Vietnam; Level: Grand Prix; Format: 64MS/32WS/32MD/32WD/32XD	Score: 21–14, 21–10	
1 December	Vietnam Open: Host: Ho Chi Minh City, Vietnam; Level: Grand Prix; Format: 64MS/32WS/32MD/32WD/32XD	(Indonesia) Shendy Puspa Irawati (Indonesia) Meiliana Jauhari	(Singapore) Shinta Mulia Sari (Singapore) Yao Lei
1 December	Vietnam Open: Host: Ho Chi Minh City, Vietnam; Level: Grand Prix; Format: 64MS/32WS/32MD/32WD/32XD	Score: 21–16, 19–21, 21–11	
1 December	Vietnam Open: Host: Ho Chi Minh City, Vietnam; Level: Grand Prix; Format: 64MS/32WS/32MD/32WD/32XD	(Indonesia) Tontowi Ahmad (Indonesia) Shendy Puspa Irawati	(Singapore) Riky Widianto (Singapore) Vanessa Neo
1 December	Vietnam Open: Host: Ho Chi Minh City, Vietnam; Level: Grand Prix; Format: 64MS/32WS/32MD/32WD/32XD	Score: 21–17, 21–9	
1 December	Irish International: Host: Dublin, Ireland; Level: International Challenge; Format: 32MS/32WS/32MD/32WD/32XD	(England) Rajiv Ouseph	(Republic of Ireland) Scott Evans
1 December	Irish International: Host: Dublin, Ireland; Level: International Challenge; Format: 32MS/32WS/32MD/32WD/32XD	Score: 21–5, 21–19	
1 December	Irish International: Host: Dublin, Ireland; Level: International Challenge; Format: 32MS/32WS/32MD/32WD/32XD	(China) Zhang Xi	(China) Li Wenyan
1 December	Irish International: Host: Dublin, Ireland; Level: International Challenge; Format: 32MS/32WS/32MD/32WD/32XD	Score: 16–21, 21–16, 21–15	
1 December	Irish International: Host: Dublin, Ireland; Level: International Challenge; Format: 32MS/32WS/32MD/32WD/32XD	(England) Richard Eidestedt (England) Andrew Ellis	(Denmark) Martin Delfs (Denmark) Morten Kronborg
1 December	Irish International: Host: Dublin, Ireland; Level: International Challenge; Format: 32MS/32WS/32MD/32WD/32XD	Score: 21–13, 21–16	
1 December	Irish International: Host: Dublin, Ireland; Level: International Challenge; Format: 32MS/32WS/32MD/32WD/32XD	(Denmark) Helle Nielsen (Denmark) Marie Røpke	(Netherlands) Patty Stolzenbach (Netherlands) Paulien van Dooremalen
1 December	Irish International: Host: Dublin, Ireland; Level: International Challenge; Format: 32MS/32WS/32MD/32WD/32XD	Score: 23–25, 21–17, 21–8	
1 December	Irish International: Host: Dublin, Ireland; Level: International Challenge; Format: 32MS/32WS/32MD/32WD/32XD	(Denmark) Jacob Chemnitz (Denmark) Marie Røpke	(Denmark) Kasper Faust Henriksen (Denmark) Britta Andersen
1 December	Irish International: Host: Dublin, Ireland; Level: International Challenge; Format: 32MS/32WS/32MD/32WD/32XD	Score: 17–21, 21–17, 21–15	
1 December	South Africa International: Host: Cape Town, South Africa; Level: Future Series; Format: 64MS/32WS/32MD/16WD/32XD	(Brazil) Daniel Paiola	(South Africa) Roelof Dednam
1 December	South Africa International: Host: Cape Town, South Africa; Level: Future Series; Format: 64MS/32WS/32MD/16WD/32XD	Score: 23–21, 18–21, 21–18	
1 December	South Africa International: Host: Cape Town, South Africa; Level: Future Series; Format: 64MS/32WS/32MD/16WD/32XD	(South Africa) Stacey Doubell	(South Africa) Kerry-Lee Harrington
1 December	South Africa International: Host: Cape Town, South Africa; Level: Future Series; Format: 64MS/32WS/32MD/16WD/32XD	Score: 21–12, 21–14	
1 December	South Africa International: Host: Cape Town, South Africa; Level: Future Series; Format: 64MS/32WS/32MD/16WD/32XD	(South Africa) Dorian James (South Africa) Willem Viljoen	(South Africa) Chris Dednam (South Africa) Roelof Dednam
1 December	South Africa International: Host: Cape Town, South Africa; Level: Future Series; Format: 64MS/32WS/32MD/16WD/32XD	Score: 21–16, 21–17	
1 December	South Africa International: Host: Cape Town, South Africa; Level: Future Series; Format: 64MS/32WS/32MD/16WD/32XD	(South Africa) Jade Morgan (South Africa) Annari Viljoen	(South Africa) Chantal Botts (South Africa) Michelle Edwards
1 December	South Africa International: Host: Cape Town, South Africa; Level: Future Series; Format: 64MS/32WS/32MD/16WD/32XD	Score: 21–12, 21–16	
1 December	South Africa International: Host: Cape Town, South Africa; Level: Future Series; Format: 64MS/32WS/32MD/16WD/32XD	(South Africa) Chris Dednam (South Africa) Michelle Edwards	(Mauritius) Stephan Beeharry (Mauritius) Shama Aboobakar
1 December	South Africa International: Host: Cape Town, South Africa; Level: Future Series; Format: 64MS/32WS/32MD/16WD/32XD	Score: 21–17, 21–12	
8 December	Italian International: Host: Rome, Italy; Level: International Challenge; Format: 32MS/32WS/32MD/32WD/32XD	(Malaysia) Wong Choong Hann	(Russia) Stanislav Pukhov
8 December	Italian International: Host: Rome, Italy; Level: International Challenge; Format: 32MS/32WS/32MD/32WD/32XD	Score: 21–16, 21–15	
8 December	Italian International: Host: Rome, Italy; Level: International Challenge; Format: 32MS/32WS/32MD/32WD/32XD	(Germany) Juliane Schenk	(Ukraine) Larisa Griga
8 December	Italian International: Host: Rome, Italy; Level: International Challenge; Format: 32MS/32WS/32MD/32WD/32XD	Score: 15–21, 21–13, 21–17	
8 December	Italian International: Host: Rome, Italy; Level: International Challenge; Format: 32MS/32WS/32MD/32WD/32XD	(Germany) Kristof Hopp (Germany) Johannes Schöttler	(Chinese Taipei) Chen Hung-ling (Chinese Taipei) Lin Yu-lang
8 December	Italian International: Host: Rome, Italy; Level: International Challenge; Format: 32MS/32WS/32MD/32WD/32XD	Score: 22–20, 21–13	
8 December	Italian International: Host: Rome, Italy; Level: International Challenge; Format: 32MS/32WS/32MD/32WD/32XD	(Russia) Valeria Sorokina (Russia) Nina Vislova	(Sweden) Emelie Lennartsson (Sweden) Emma Wengberg
8 December	Italian International: Host: Rome, Italy; Level: International Challenge; Format: 32MS/32WS/32MD/32WD/32XD	Score: 23–21, 21–14	
8 December	Italian International: Host: Rome, Italy; Level: International Challenge; Format: 32MS/32WS/32MD/32WD/32XD	(Russia) Vitalij Durkin (Russia) Nina Vislova	(Germany) Johannes Schöttler (Germany) Birgit Overzier
8 December	Italian International: Host: Rome, Italy; Level: International Challenge; Format: 32MS/32WS/32MD/32WD/32XD	Score: 20–22, 21–19, 21–18	
8 December	Korean International: Host: Yeosu, South Korea; Level: International Challenge; Format: 64MS/64WS/32MD/32WD/16XD	(South Korea) Park Sung-hwan	(South Korea) Lee Cheol-ho
8 December	Korean International: Host: Yeosu, South Korea; Level: International Challenge; Format: 64MS/64WS/32MD/32WD/16XD	Score: 21–14, 21–13	
8 December	Korean International: Host: Yeosu, South Korea; Level: International Challenge; Format: 64MS/64WS/32MD/32WD/16XD	(South Korea) Kwon Hee-sook	(South Korea) Bae Yeon-ju
8 December	Korean International: Host: Yeosu, South Korea; Level: International Challenge; Format: 64MS/64WS/32MD/32WD/16XD	Score: 21–17, 21–19	
8 December	Korean International: Host: Yeosu, South Korea; Level: International Challenge; Format: 64MS/64WS/32MD/32WD/16XD	(South Korea) Jung Jae-sung (South Korea) Lee Yong-dae	(South Korea) Cho Gun-woo (South Korea) Yoo Yeon-seong
8 December	Korean International: Host: Yeosu, South Korea; Level: International Challenge; Format: 64MS/64WS/32MD/32WD/16XD	Score: 21–16, 26–24	
8 December	Korean International: Host: Yeosu, South Korea; Level: International Challenge; Format: 64MS/64WS/32MD/32WD/16XD	(South Korea) Ha Jung-eun (South Korea) Kim Min-jung	(South Korea) Jang Ye-na (South Korea) Kim Mi-young
8 December	Korean International: Host: Yeosu, South Korea; Level: International Challenge; Format: 64MS/64WS/32MD/32WD/16XD	Score: 21–15, 21–14	
8 December	Korean International: Host: Yeosu, South Korea; Level: International Challenge; Format: 64MS/64WS/32MD/32WD/16XD	(South Korea) Hwang Ji-man (South Korea) Hwang Yu-mi	(South Korea) Lee Jae-jin (South Korea) Kim Jin-ock
8 December	Korean International: Host: Yeosu, South Korea; Level: International Challenge; Format: 64MS/64WS/32MD/32WD/16XD	Score: 21–15, 21–14	
15 December	Hellas International: Host: Thessaloniki, Greece; Level: International Series; Format: 32MS/32WS/32MD/16WD/32XD	(Chinese Taipei) Hsieh Yu-hsing	(Denmark) Sune Gavnholt
15 December	Hellas International: Host: Thessaloniki, Greece; Level: International Series; Format: 32MS/32WS/32MD/16WD/32XD	Score: 21–10, 21–18	
15 December	Hellas International: Host: Thessaloniki, Greece; Level: International Series; Format: 32MS/32WS/32MD/16WD/32XD	(Chinese Taipei) Hung Shih-han	(Bulgaria) Dimitria Popstoikova
15 December	Hellas International: Host: Thessaloniki, Greece; Level: International Series; Format: 32MS/32WS/32MD/16WD/32XD	Score: 21–16, 21–14	
15 December	Hellas International: Host: Thessaloniki, Greece; Level: International Series; Format: 32MS/32WS/32MD/16WD/32XD	(Chinese Taipei) Chien Yu-hsun (Chinese Taipei) Lin Yen-jui	(Chinese Taipei) Chen Hung-ling (Chinese Taipei) Lin Yu-lang
15 December	Hellas International: Host: Thessaloniki, Greece; Level: International Series; Format: 32MS/32WS/32MD/16WD/32XD	Score: 21–19, 22–20	
15 December	Hellas International: Host: Thessaloniki, Greece; Level: International Series; Format: 32MS/32WS/32MD/16WD/32XD	(Denmark) Maria Helsbøl (Denmark) Anne Skelbæk	(Turkey) Ezgi Epice (Turkey) Aprilsasi Putri Lejarsar Variella
15 December	Hellas International: Host: Thessaloniki, Greece; Level: International Series; Format: 32MS/32WS/32MD/16WD/32XD	Score: 21–19, 21–19	
15 December	Hellas International: Host: Thessaloniki, Greece; Level: International Series; Format: 32MS/32WS/32MD/16WD/32XD	(Chinese Taipei) Chen Hung-ling (Chinese Taipei) Hsieh Pei-chen	(Denmark) Peter Mørk (Denmark) Maria Helsbøl
15 December	Hellas International: Host: Thessaloniki, Greece; Level: International Series; Format: 32MS/32WS/32MD/16WD/32XD	Score: 21–6, 21–9	
15 December	Super Series Masters Finals (Draw): Host: Kota Kinabalu, Malaysia; Level: Super Series Masters Finals; Format: 8MS/8WS/8MD/8WD/8XD (RR)	(Malaysia) Lee Chong Wei	(Denmark) Peter Gade
15 December	Super Series Masters Finals (Draw): Host: Kota Kinabalu, Malaysia; Level: Super Series Masters Finals; Format: 8MS/8WS/8MD/8WD/8XD (RR)	Score: 21–8, 21–16	
15 December	Super Series Masters Finals (Draw): Host: Kota Kinabalu, Malaysia; Level: Super Series Masters Finals; Format: 8MS/8WS/8MD/8WD/8XD (RR)	(Hong Kong) Zhou Mi	(Hong Kong) Wang Chen
15 December	Super Series Masters Finals (Draw): Host: Kota Kinabalu, Malaysia; Level: Super Series Masters Finals; Format: 8MS/8WS/8MD/8WD/8XD (RR)	Score: 21–14, 21–18	
15 December	Super Series Masters Finals (Draw): Host: Kota Kinabalu, Malaysia; Level: Super Series Masters Finals; Format: 8MS/8WS/8MD/8WD/8XD (RR)	(Malaysia) Koo Kien Keat (Malaysia) Tan Boon Heong	(South Korea) Jung Jae-sung (South Korea) Lee Yong-dae
15 December	Super Series Masters Finals (Draw): Host: Kota Kinabalu, Malaysia; Level: Super Series Masters Finals; Format: 8MS/8WS/8MD/8WD/8XD (RR)	Score: 21–18, 21–14	
15 December	Super Series Masters Finals (Draw): Host: Kota Kinabalu, Malaysia; Level: Super Series Masters Finals; Format: 8MS/8WS/8MD/8WD/8XD (RR)	(Malaysia) Chin Eei Hui (Malaysia) Wong Pei Tty	(Indonesia) Vita Marissa (Indonesia) Liliyana Natsir
15 December	Super Series Masters Finals (Draw): Host: Kota Kinabalu, Malaysia; Level: Super Series Masters Finals; Format: 8MS/8WS/8MD/8WD/8XD (RR)	Score: 21–15, 22–20	
15 December	Super Series Masters Finals (Draw): Host: Kota Kinabalu, Malaysia; Level: Super Series Masters Finals; Format: 8MS/8WS/8MD/8WD/8XD (RR)	(Denmark) Thomas Laybourn (Denmark) Kamilla Rytter Juhl	(Indonesia) Nova Widianto (Indonesia) Liliyana Natsir
15 December	Super Series Masters Finals (Draw): Host: Kota Kinabalu, Malaysia; Level: Super Series Masters Finals; Format: 8MS/8WS/8MD/8WD/8XD (RR)	Score: 21–19, 18–21, 22–20	
December 22	Copenhagen Masters: Host: Copenhagen, Denmark; Level: Invitation; Format: 6MS/4WS/6MD (round robin)	(Denmark) Peter Gade	(Denmark) Kenneth Jonassen
December 22	Copenhagen Masters: Host: Copenhagen, Denmark; Level: Invitation; Format: 6MS/4WS/6MD (round robin)	Score: 21–14, 21–15	
December 22	Copenhagen Masters: Host: Copenhagen, Denmark; Level: Invitation; Format: 6MS/4WS/6MD (round robin)	(Denmark) Tine Rasmussen	(Germany) Xu Huaiwen
December 22	Copenhagen Masters: Host: Copenhagen, Denmark; Level: Invitation; Format: 6MS/4WS/6MD (round robin)	Score: 21–18, 21–17	
December 22	Copenhagen Masters: Host: Copenhagen, Denmark; Level: Invitation; Format: 6MS/4WS/6MD (round robin)	(Denmark) Lars Paaske (Denmark) Jonas Rasmussen	(Denmark) Mathias Boe (Denmark) Carsten Mogensen
December 22	Copenhagen Masters: Host: Copenhagen, Denmark; Level: Invitation; Format: 6MS/4WS/6MD (round robin)	Score: 14–21, 21–13, 21–19	
