= Danish Badminton League =

Badminton competition in Denmark

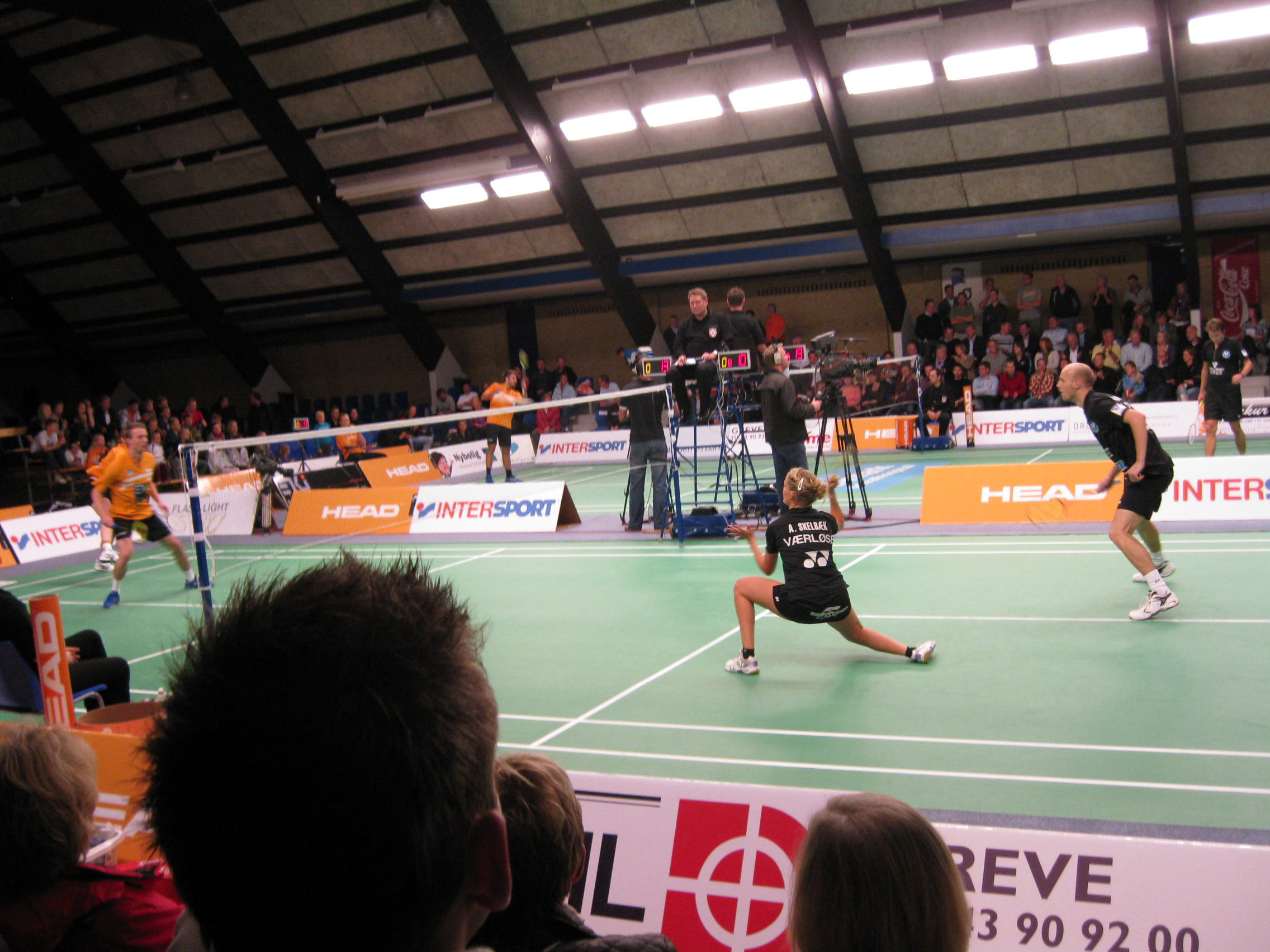
Greve Strands BK against Værløse

The Danish Badminton League, or Badmintonligaen, is the highest-level national team tournament for badminton clubs in Denmark. It is run by Badminton Denmark, with the regular season lasting from September to February. Københavns Badminton Klub is the most successful club in the competition, with 18 title wins, while Gentofte BK has won the title 16 times, the second-most in the league.

== Competition format ==
The league consists of 10 teams, each of which plays against the 9 other teams throughout the season. Each event consists of 9 matches: 2 mixed doubles, 2 men’s singles, 2 ladies singles, 2 men’s doubles, and 1 ladies doubles. The top four teams will then qualify for a final four tournament and the winning club then qualifies for the Europe Cup.

=== Relegation ===
The last place team will be relegated to the 1st division. The 8th and 9th place teams play a match to decide who remains in the league, with the losing team facing the 2nd place team from 1st division to decide if the team remains or is relegated.

=== Notable players ===
Many top Danish players such as Rasmus Gemke, Mia Blichfeldt, Line Christophersen, and Anders Skaarup Rasmussen participate in the league; however, foreign players such as Brian Yang, Carolina Marin, Loh Kean Yew, Iris Wang (USA), the Stoeva sisters, Marc Caljouw, Kalle Koljonen, Beiwen Zhang, Ygor Coelho, and Ruben Jill also have competed for various clubs in recent years. Team Slagelse-Skælskør and Vendsyssel Badminton in particular are known for rosters dominated by foreign players.

== Season Results ==
=== 2024-2025 Season ===
| # | Team | Fights | Won | Score | Set | Points |
|---|---|---|---|---|---|---|
| 1 | Højbjerg/Via Biler (M) | 9 | 9 | 55-26 | 118-62 | 78 |
| 2 | Vendsyssel | 9 | 6 | 57-24 | 124-62 | 78 |
| 3 | Skovshoved | 9 | 7 | 51-30 | 110-75 | 71 |
| 4 | Solrød Strand | 9 | 5 | 45-36 | 98-84 | 62 |
| 5 | Hvidovre | 9 | 5 | 45-36 | 105-85 | 61 |
| 6 | RSL ODENSE OBK | 9 | 4 | 41-40 | 94-94 | 53 |
| 7 | Team Skælskør-Slagelse | 9 | 4 | 37-44 | 86-98 | 45 |
| 8 | Værløse | 9 | 3 | 34-47 | 78-107 | 42 |
| 9 | Gentofte | 9 | 2 | 34-47 | 86-108 | 41 |
| 10 | Aalborg Triton (O) | 9 | 0 | 6-75 | 28-152 | 6 |

=== 2023-2024 Season ===
| # | Team | Fights | Won | Score | Set | Points |
|---|---|---|---|---|---|---|
| 1 | Højbjerg/Via Biler | 9 | 8 | 59-22 | 127-59 | 83 |
| 2 | Skovshoved | 9 | 8 | 55-26 | 123-70 | 77 |
| 3 | Vendsyssel (M) | 9 | 6 | 51-30 | 118-75 | 70 |
| 4 | Team Skælskør-Slagelse | 9 | 5 | 45-36 | 96-84 | 61 |
| 5 | RSL ODENSE OBK | 9 | 5 | 40-41 | 94-99 | 53 |
| 6 | Hvidovre (O) | 9 | 4 | 37-44 | 89-101 | 48 |
| 7 | Solrød Strand | 9 | 2 | 36-45 | 92-100 | 43 |
| 8 | Værløse | 9 | 4 | 32-49 | 79-110 | 42 |
| 9 | Gentofte | 9 | 2 | 31-50 | 77-112 | 39 |
| 10 | Aarhus AB | 9 | 1 | 19-62 | 47-132 | 22 |

=== 2022-2023 Season ===
| # | Team | Fights | Won | Score | Set | Points |
|---|---|---|---|---|---|---|
| 1 | Højbjerg/Via Biler | 9 | 8 | 53-28 | 118-74 | 76 |
| 2 | Vendsyssel (M) | 9 | 7 | 55-26 | 122-62 | 76 |
| 3 | Skovshoved | 9 | 7 | 54-27 | 118-62 | 75 |
| 4 | Team Skælskør-Slagelse | 9 | 7 | 46-35 | 101-78 | 64 |
| 5 | Solrød Strand | 9 | 5 | 46-35 | 107-87 | 62 |
| 6 | RSL ODENSE OBK | 9 | 4 | 33-48 | 82-101 | 44 |
| 7 | Gentofte | 9 | 2 | 35-46 | 76-105 | 43 |
| 8 | Værløse | 9 | 3 | 32-49 | 70-108 | 41 |
| 9 | Aarhus AB | 9 | 2 | 33-48 | 75-104 | 41 |
| 10 | KMB2010 (O) | 9 | 0 | 18-63 | 46-134 | 18 |

== Winners ==
| Season | Winner |
|---|---|
| 1949-50 | Gentofte BK |
| 1950-51 | Gentofte BK |
| 1951-52 | Gentofte BK |
| 1952-53 | Københavns Badminton Klub |
| 1953-54 | Københavns Badminton Klub |
| 1954-55 | Københavns Badminton Klub |
| 1955-56 | Københavns Badminton Klub |
| 1956-57 | Amager Badminton Club |
| 1957-58 | Københavns Badminton Klub |
| 1958-59 | Københavns Badminton Klub |
| 1959-60 | Københavns Badminton Klub |
| 1960-61 | Københavns Badminton Klub |
| 1961-62 | Københavns Badminton Klub |
| 1962-63 | Københavns Badminton Klub |
| 1963-64 | Københavns Badminton Klub |
| 1964-65 | Skovshoved Idrætsforening |
| 1965-66 | Københavns Badminton Klub |
| 1966-67 | Skovshoved Idrætsforening |
| 1967-68 | Københavns Badminton Klub |
| 1968-69 | Skovshoved Idrætsforening |
| 1969-70 | Københavns Badminton Klub |
| 1970-71 | Københavns Badminton Klub |
| 1971-72 | Københavns Badminton Klub |
| 1972-73 | Københavns Badminton Klub |
| 1973-74 | Københavns Badminton Klub |
| 1974-75 | Gentofte BK |
| 1975-76 | Gentofte BK |
| 1976-77 | Gentofte BK |
| 1977-78 | Gentofte BK |
| 1978-79 | Gentofte BK |
| 1979-80 | Hvidovre BK |
| 1980-81 | Badmintonklubben Triton Aalborg |
| 1981-82 | Højbjerg Badminton Klub |
| 1982-83 | Gentofte BK |
| 1983-84 | Gentofte BK |
| 1984-85 | Badmintonklubben Triton Aalborg |
| 1985-86 | Gentofte BK |
| 1986-87 | Højbjerg Badminton Klub |
| 1987-88 | Badmintonkubben Triton Aalborg |
| 1988-89 | Gentofte BK |
| 1989-90 | Gentofte BK |
| 1990-91 | Gentofte BK |
| 1991-92 | Gentofte BK |
| 1992-93 | Lillerød BK |
| 1993-94 | Lillerød BK |
| 1994-95 | Lillerød BK |
| 1995-96 | Lillerød BK |
| 1996-97 | Gentofte BK |
| 1997-98 | Kastrup-Magleby Badminton Klub |
| 1998-99 | Kastrup-Magleby Badminton Klub |
| 1999-00 | Kastrup-Magleby Badminton Klub |
| 2000-01 | Hvidovre Badminton Club |
| 2001-02 | Kastrup-Magleby Badminton Klub |
| 2002-23 | Kastrup-Magleby Badminton Klub |
| 2003-04 | Kastrup-Magleby Badminton Klub |
| 2004-05 | Kastrup-Magleby Badminton Klub |
| 2005-06 | Hvidovre Badminton Club |
| 2006-07 | Kastrup-Magleby Badminton Klub |
| 2007-08 | Greve Strands BK |
| 2008-09 | Team Skælskør-Slagelse |
| 2009-10 | Greve Strands BK |
| 2010-11 | Greve Strands BK |
| 2011-12 | Team Skælskør-Slagelse |
| 2012-13 | Team Skælskør-Slagelse |
| 2013-14 | Team Skælskør-Slagelse |
| 2014-15 | Greve Strands BK |
| 2015-16 | Team Skælskør-Slagelse & Skovshoved Idrætsforening (no final was played) |
| 2016-17 | Skovshoved Idrætsforening |
| 2017-18 | Skovshoved Idrætsforening |
| 2018-19 | Team Skælskør-Slagelse |
| 2019-20 | Skovshoved Idrætsforening |
| 2020-21 | Skovshoved Idrætsforening |
| 2021-22 | Vendsyssel |
| 2022-23 | Vendsyssel |
| 2023-24 | Højbjerg Badminton Klub |
| 2024-25 | Vendsyssel |

== See also ==
- Danish National Badminton Championships
