= Danish National Badminton Championships =

The Danish National Badminton Championships is a tournament organized to crown the best badminton players in Denmark since the season 1930/1931.

== Winners ==
Season	Men's singles	Women's singles	Men's doubles	Women's doubles	Mixed doubles
1931	Kaj Andersen, Københavns BK	Ruth Frederiksen, Skovshoved IF	Sejlidt Raaskou; Sven Strømann, Skovshoved IF	Gerda Frederiksen; Ruth Frederiksen, Skovshoved IF	Aksel Hansen; Bodil Clausen, Skovshoved IF
1932	Sven Strømann, Skovshoved IF	Ruth Frederiksen, Skovshoved IF	Sejlidt Raaskou; Sven Strømann, Skovshoved IF	Gerda Frederiksen; Ruth Frederiksen, Skovshoved IF	Sejlidt Raaskou; Gerda Frederiksen, Skovshoved IF
1933	Kaj Andersen, Københavns BK	Ruth Frederiksen, Skovshoved IF	Sejlidt Raaskou; Sven Strømann, Skovshoved IF	Gerda Frederiksen; Ruth Frederiksen, Skovshoved IF	Sven Strømann; Ruth Frederiksen, Skovshoved IF
1934	Sven Strømann, Skovshoved IF	Ruth Frederiksen, Skovshoved IF	Aksel Hansen; Sven Strømann, Skovshoved IF	Gerda Frederiksen; Ruth Frederiksen, Skovshoved IF	Sven Strømann; Ruth Frederiksen, Skovshoved IF
1935	Poul Vagn Nielsen, Gentofte BK	Ruth Frederiksen, Skovshoved IF	Aksel Hansen; Sven Strømann, Skovshoved IF	Gerda Frederiksen; Ruth Frederiksen, Skovshoved IF	Sven Strømann; Ruth Frederiksen, Skovshoved IF
1936	Poul Vagn Nielsen, Gentofte BK	Ruth Frederiksen, Skovshoved IF	Eric Kirchoff; Poul Vagn Nielsen, Gentofte BK	Bodil Strømann, Skovshoved IF; Tonny Olsen, Gentofte BK	Poul Vagn Nielsen; Tonny Olsen, Gentofte BK
1937	Eric Kirchoff, Gentofte BK	Ruth Dalsgaard, Skovshoved IF	Tage Madsen; Carl Frøhlke, Skovshoved IF	Gerda Frederiksen; Ruth Dalsgaard, Skovshoved IF	Aksel Hansen; Ruth Dalsgaard, Skovshoved IF
1938	Tage Madsen, Skovshoved IF	Tonny Olsen, Gentofte BK	Tage Madsen; Carl Frøhlke, Skovshoved IF	Bodil Rise; Tonny Olsen, Gentofte BK	Tage Madsen; Bodil Strømann, Skovshoved IF
1939	Conny Jepsen, Skovshoved IF	Tonny Olsen, Gentofte BK	Gunnar Holm; Niels Kjems, Skovshoved IF	Bodil Rise; Tonny Olsen, Gentofte BK	Tage Madsen; Ruth Dalsgaard, Skovshoved IF
1940	Tage Madsen, Skovshoved IF	Tonny Olsen, Gentofte BK	Tage Madsen; Carl Frøhlke, Skovshoved IF	Bodil Duus; Tonny Olsen, Gentofte BK	Tage Madsen; Ruth Dalsgaard, Skovshoved IF
1941	Conny Jepsen, Skovshoved IF	Agnete Friis, Odense BK	Tage Madsen; Carl Frøhlke, Skovshoved IF	Agnete Friis, Odense BK; Jytte Thayssen, Skovshoved IF	Jan Schmidt; Jytte Thayssen, Skovshoved IF
1942	Tage Madsen, Skovshoved IF	Tonny Olsen, Gentofte BK	Tage Madsen; Carl Frøhlke, Skovshoved IF	Ruth Dalsgaard; Jytte Thayssen, Skovshoved IF	Tage Madsen; Ruth Dalsgaard, Skovshoved IF
1943	Tage Madsen, Skovshoved IF	Tonny Olsen, Gentofte BK	Jesper Bie, Københavns BK; Børge Frederiksen, Skovshoved IF	Agnete Friis, Odense BK; Tonny Olsen, Gentofte BK	Jan Schmidt; Jytte Thayssen, Skovshoved IF
1944	Tage Madsen, Skovshoved IF	Agnete Friis, Amager BC	Tage Madsen; Carl Frøhlke, Skovshoved IF	Marie Ussing; Jytte Thayssen, Skovshoved IF	Jan Schmidt; Jytte Thayssen, Skovshoved IF
1945	Tage Madsen, Skovshoved IF	Tonny Olsen, Gentofte BK	Tage Madsen; Carl Frøhlke, Skovshoved IF	Marie Ussing; Jytte Thayssen, Skovshoved IF	Jan Schmidt; Jytte Thayssen, Skovshoved IF
1946	Tage Madsen, Skovshoved IF	Tonny Olsen, Gentofte BK	Jørn Skaarup; Preben Dabelsteen, Nykøbing F.	Agnete Friis; Tonny Olsen, Gentofte BK	Tage Madsen, Skovshoved IF; Kirsten Thorndahl, Amager BC
1947	Jørn Skaarup, Nykøbing F.	Kirsten Thorndahl, Amager BC	Jørn Skaarup, Nykøbing F. Preben Dabelsteen, Frederiksberg BK	Agnete Friis; Tonny Ahm, Gentofte BK	Poul Holm; Aase Schiøtt Jacobsen, Gentofte BK
1948	Jørn Skaarup, Frederiksberg BK	Tonny Ahm, Gentofte BK	Jørn Skaarup, Frederiksberg BK; Preben Dabelsteen, Københavns BK	Agnete Friis; Tonny Ahm, Gentofte BK	Jørn Skaarup, Frederiksberg BK; Tonny Ahm, Gentofte BK
1949	Poul Holm, Gentofte BK	Tonny Ahm, Gentofte BK	Tage Madsen; Børge Frederiksen, Skovshoved IF	Kirsten Thorndahl, Amager BC; Aase Svendsen, Københavns BK	Tage Madsen, Frederiksberg BK; Kirsten Thorndahl, Amager BC
1950	Jørn Skaarup, Københavns BK	Tonny Ahm, Gentofte BK	Ib Olesen, Københavns BK; John Nygaard, Amager BC	Agnete Friis; Birgit Rostgaard Frøhne, Gentofte BK	Poul Holm; Tonny Ahm, Gentofte BK
1951	Poul Holm, Gentofte BK	Kirsten Thorndahl, Amager BC	Jørn Skaarup; Preben Dabelsteen, Københavns BK	Aase Schiøtt Jacobsen; Tonny Ahm, Gentofte BK	Arve Lossmann; Kirsten Thorndahl, Amager BC
1952	Poul Holm, Gentofte BK	Tonny Ahm, Gentofte BK	Poul Holm; Ole Jensen, Gentofte BK	Jytte Kjems; Marie Ussing, Skovshoved IF	Poul Holm; Tonny Ahm, Gentofte BK
1953	Poul Holm, Gentofte BK	Aase Schiøtt Jacobsen, Gentofte BK	Poul Holm; Ole Jensen, Gentofte BK	Agnete Friis; Birgit Schultz-Pedersen, Gentofte BK	Jørgen Hammergaard Hansen; Anni Jørgensen, Københavns BK
1954	Jørn Skaarup, Københavns BK	Aase Schiøtt Jacobsen, Gentofte BK	Poul Holm; Ole Jensen, Gentofte BK	Agnete Friis; Birgit Schultz-Pedersen, Gentofte BK	Finn Kobberø; Inge Birgit Anker Hansen, Københavns BK
1955	Finn Kobberø, Københavns BK	Inger Kjærgaard, Odense BK	Finn Kobberø; Jørgen Hammergaard Hansen, Københavns BK	Aase Winther; Anni Jørgensen, Københavns BK	Poul-Erik Nielsen, Skovshoved IF; Kirsten Thorndahl, Amager BC
1956	Palle Granlund, Amager BC	Tonny Petersen, Amager BC	Jørn Skaarup; Preben Dabelsteen, Københavns BK	Aase Winther; Inge Birgit Anker Hansen, Københavns BK	Jørn Skaarup; Anni Jørgensen, Københavns BK
1957	Finn Kobberø, Københavns BK	Tonny Ahm, Gentofte BK	Finn Kobberø; Jørgen Hammergaard Hansen, Københavns BK	Kirsten Thorndahl, Amager BC; Anni Hammergaard Hansen, Københavns BK	Finn Kobberø; Lis Hagen Olsen, Københavns BK
1958	Finn Kobberø, Københavns BK	Hanne Jensen, Københavns BK	Finn Kobberø; Jørgen Hammergaard Hansen, Københavns BK	Agnete Friis; Birte Kristiansen, Gentofte BK	Finn Kobberø; Lis Hagen Olsen, Københavns BK
1959	Knud Aage Nielsen, Nykøbing F.	Inger Kjærgaard, Odense BK	Finn Kobberø; Bent Albertsen, Københavns BK	Kirsten Thorndahl, Amager BC; Hanne Jensen, Københavns BK	Poul-Erik Nielsen, Skovshoved IF; Inge Birgit Anker Hansen, Københavns BK
1960	Finn Kobberø, Københavns BK	Tonny Holst-Christensen, Amager BC	Finn Kobberø; Bent Albertsen, Københavns BK	Aase Winther; Inge Birgit Anker Hansen, Københavns BK	Finn Kobberø, Københavns BK; Kirsten Thorndahl, Amager BC
1961	Erland Kops, Københavns BK	Hanne Jensen, Københavns BK	Erland Kops, Københavns BK; Poul-Erik Nielsen, Skovshoved IF	Kirsten Thorndahl, Amager BC; Hanne Jensen, Københavns BK	Poul-Erik Nielsen, Skovshoved IF; Inge Birgit Anker Hansen, Københavns BK
1962	Erland Kops, Københavns BK	Karin Jørgensen, Københavns BK	Finn Kobberø; Jørgen Hammergaard Hansen, Københavns BK	Karin Jørgensen; Ulla Rasmussen, Københavns BK	Finn Kobberø, Københavns BK; Kirsten Thorndahl, Valby BC
1963	Henning Borch, Amager BC	Ulla Rasmussen, Københavns BK	Finn Kobberø; Jørgen Hammergaard Hansen, Københavns BK	Karin Jørgensen; Ulla Rasmussen, Københavns BK	Finn Kobberø; Anne Flindt, Københavns BK
1964	Erland Kops, Københavns BK	Pernille Mølgaard Hansen, Gentofte BK	Finn Kobberø; Jørgen Hammergaard Hansen, Københavns BK	Karin Jørgensen; Ulla Rasmussen, Københavns BK	Finn Kobberø; Ulla Rasmussen, Københavns BK
1965	Erland Kops, Københavns BK	Ulla Rasmussen, Københavns BK	Erland Kops, Københavns BK; Carsten Morild, Triton Aalborg	Karin Jørgensen; Ulla Rasmussen, Københavns BK	Finn Kobberø; Ulla Rasmussen, Københavns BK
1966	Svend Pri, Amager BC	Lizbeth von Barnekow, Charlottenlund BK	Finn Kobberø; Jørgen Hammergaard Hansen, Københavns BK	Karin Jørgensen; Ulla Strand, Københavns BK	Finn Kobberø; Ulla Strand, Københavns BK
1967	Erland Kops, Københavns BK	Lonny Funch, Skovshoved IF	Henning Borch; Jørgen Mortensen, Amager BC	Marianne Svensson; Ulla Strand, Københavns BK	Per Walsøe; Pernille Mølgaard Hansen, Gentofte BK
1968	Svend Pri, Amager BC	Ulla Strand, Københavns BK	Erland Kops, Københavns BK; Henning Borch, Amager BC	Anne Flindt; Bente Flindt Sørensen, Gentofte BK	Svend Pri, Amager BC; Ulla Strand, Københavns BK
1969	Svend Pri, Amager BC	Imre Rietveld Nielsen, Skovshoved IF	Erland Kops, Københavns BK; Henning Borch, Amager BC	Karin Jørgensen, Københavns BK; Lizbeth von Barnekow, Charlottenlund BK	Per Walsøe; Pernille Mølgaard Hansen, Gentofte BK
1970	Svend Pri, Amager BC	Imre Rietveld Nielsen, Nykøbing F.	Svend Pri, Amager BC; Per Walsøe, Gentofte BK	Karin Jørgensen; Ulla Strand, Københavns BK	Per Walsøe; Pernille Mølgaard Hansen, Gentofte BK
1971	Jørgen Mortensen, Amager BC	Lizbeth von Barnekow, Charlottenlund BK	Svend Pri, Amager BC; Per Walsøe, Gentofte BK	Karin Jørgensen; Ulla Strand, Københavns BK	Svend Pri, Amager BC; Ulla Strand, Københavns BK
1972	Svend Pri, Amager BC	Lene Køppen, Valby BC	Poul Petersen, Østerbro BK; Per Walsøe, Gentofte BK	Pernille Kaagaard; Anne Flindt, Gentofte BK	Svend Pri, Amager BC; Ulla Strand, Københavns BK
1973	Svend Pri, Amager BC	Lene Køppen, Valby BC	Svend Pri, Amager BC; Poul Petersen, Østerbro BK	Ulla Strand, Københavns BK; Lene Køppen, Valby BC	Svend Pri, Amager BC; Ulla Strand, Københavns BK
1974	Svend Pri, Søllerød-Nærum IK	Lene Køppen, Valby BC	Svend Pri, Søllerød-Nærum IK; Poul Petersen, Østerbro BK	Pernille Kaagaard, Gentofte BK; Ulla Strand, Københavns BK	Elo Hansen; Ulla Strand, Københavns BK
1975	Svend Pri, Søllerød-Nærum IK	Lene Køppen, Gentofte BK	Elo Hansen; Flemming Delfs, Københavns BK	Lene Køppen, Gentofte BK; Inge Borgstrøm, Ringsted	Steen Skovgaard; Pernille Kaagaard, Gentofte BK
1976	Flemming Delfs, Værløse	Lene Køppen, Gentofte BK	Elo Hansen, Hvidovre BC; Flemming Delfs, Værløse	Lene Køppen, Gentofte BK; Inge Borgstrøm, Ringsted	Steen Skovgaard; Pernille Kaagaard, Gentofte BK
1977	Flemming Delfs, Værløse	Lene Køppen, Gentofte BK	Steen Skovgaard, Gentofte BK; Svend Pri, Søllerød-Nærum IK	Lene Køppen, Gentofte BK; Lonny Bostofte, Nykøbing F.	Steen Skovgaard; Lene Køppen, Gentofte BK
1978	Morten Frost, Gentofte BK	Lene Køppen, Gentofte BK	Steen Skovgaard, Gentofte BK; Flemming Delfs, Værløse	Pia Nielsen; Inge Borgstrøm, Køge BK	Steen Skovgaard; Lene Køppen, Gentofte BK
1979	Morten Frost, Gentofte BK	Lene Køppen, Gentofte BK	Mogens Neergaard; Kenneth Larsen, Triton Aalborg	Lene Køppen; Susanne Berg, Gentofte BK	Steen Skovgaard; Lene Køppen, Gentofte BK
1980	Morten Frost, Gentofte BK	Lene Køppen, Gentofte BK	Steen Fladberg, Køge BK; Morten Frost, Gentofte BK	Lene Køppen; Anne Skovgaard, Gentofte BK	Steen Skovgaard; Lene Køppen, Gentofte BK
1981	Flemming Delfs, Greve Strands BK	Lene Køppen, Gentofte BK	Steen Skovgaard, Gentofte BK; Flemming Delfs, Greve Strands BK	Lene Køppen; Anne Skovgaard, Gentofte BK	Steen Skovgaard; Anne Skovgaard, Gentofte BK
1982	Morten Frost, Gentofte BK	Lene Køppen, Gentofte BK	Steen Fladberg, Køge BK; Morten Frost, Gentofte BK	Lene Køppen; Anne Skovgaard, Gentofte BK	Steen Skovgaard; Anne Skovgaard, Gentofte BK
1983	Morten Frost, Gentofte BK	Lene Køppen, Gentofte BK	Steen Skovgaard; Jens Peter Nierhoff, Gentofte BK	Nettie Nielsen, Hvidovre BC; Dorte Kjær, Greve Strands BK	Steen Skovgaard; Anne Skovgaard, Gentofte BK
1984	Morten Frost, Gentofte BK	Kirsten Larsen, Gentofte BK	Jens Peter Nierhoff; Morten Frost, Gentofte BK	Hanne Adsbøl, Lyngby BK; Kirsten Larsen, Gentofte BK	Morten Frost; Ulla-Britt Frost, Gentofte BK
1985	Torben Carlsen, Triton Aalborg	Lisbet Stuer-Lauridsen, Gentofte BK	Michael Kjeldsen, Gentofte BK; Mark Christiansen, Triton Aalborg	Nettie Nielsen, Hvidovre BC; Dorte Kjær, Greve Strands BK	Steen Fladberg, Køge BK; Gitte Paulsen, Triton Aalborg
1986	Ib Frederiksen, Gentofte BK	Kirsten Larsen, Gentofte BK	Michael Kjeldsen, Gentofte BK; Mark Christiansen, Triton Aalborg	Nettie Nielsen, Hvidovre BC; Dorte Kjær, Greve Strands BK	Steen Fladberg, Køge BK; Gitte Paulsen, Triton Aalborg
1987	Morten Frost, Gentofte BK	Kirsten Larsen, Gentofte BK	Jan Paulsen, Triton Aalborg; Steen Fladberg, Køge BK	Nettie Nielsen, Hvidovre BC; Dorte Kjær, Greve Strands BK	Steen Fladberg, Køge BK; Gitte Paulsen, Triton Aalborg
1988	Michael Kjeldsen, Triton Aalborg	Kirsten Larsen, Køge BK	Michael Kjeldsen, Triton Aalborg; Jens Peter Nierhoff, Hvidovre BC	Dorte Kjær, Greve Strands BK; Nettie Nielsen, Hvidovre BC	Mark Christiansen; Marian Christiansen, Triton Aalborg
1989	Poul-Erik Høyer Larsen, Gentofte BK	Kirsten Larsen, Køge BK	Michael Kjeldsen, Skovshoved IF; Mark Christiansen, Triton Aalborg	Anne Mette Bille, Skovshoved IF; Lotte Olsen, Kastrup-Magleby BK	Henrik Svarrer, Hvidovre BC; Dorte Kjær, Greve Strands BK
1990	Morten Frost, Nykøbing S	Charlotte Hattens, Gentofte BK	Jens Peter Nierhoff, Hvidovre BC; Jon Holst-Christensen, Lillerød	Nettie Nielsen, Hvidovre BC; Dorte Kjær, Greve Strands BK	Thomas Lund, Kastrup-Magleby BK; Pernille Dupont, Gentofte BK
1991	Morten Frost, Nykøbing S	Camilla Martin, Højbjerg BK	Jon Holst-Christensen, Lillerød; Thomas Lund, Kastrup-Magleby BK	Dorte Kjær, Greve Strands BK; Lotte Olsen, Kastrup-Magleby BK	Jon Holst-Christensen, Lillerød; Grete Mogensen, Herning BK
1992	Thomas Stuer-Lauridsen, Gentofte BK	Camilla Martin, Højbjerg BK	Jon Holst-Christensen, Lillerød; Thomas Lund, Kastrup-Magleby BK	Pernille Dupont, Gentofte BK; Grete Mogensen, Herning	Thomas Lund, Kastrup-Magleby BK; Pernille Dupont, Gentofte BK
1993	Thomas Stuer-Lauridsen, Gentofte BK	Camilla Martin, Højbjerg BK	Jon Holst-Christensen, Lillerød; Thomas Lund, Kastrup-Magleby BK	Grete Mogensen, Herning; Lisbet Stuer-Lauridsen, Lillerød	Thomas Lund, Kastrup-Magleby BK; Marlene Thomsen, Skovshoved IF
1994	Thomas Stuer-Lauridsen, Gentofte BK	Camilla Martin, Højbjerg BK	Jon Holst-Christensen, Lillerød; Michael Søgaard, Kastrup-Magleby BK	Lisbet Stuer-Lauridsen, Lillerød; Lotte Olsen, Kastrup-Magleby BK	Jon Holst-Christensen, Lillerød; Rikke Olsen, Kastrup-Magleby BK
1995	Poul-Erik Høyer Larsen, Lillerød	Camilla Martin, Højbjerg BK	Jon Holst-Christensen, Lillerød; Thomas Lund, Kastrup-Magleby BK	Helene Kirkegaard, Lillerød; Rikke Olsen, Kastrup-Magleby BK	Jon Holst-Christensen, Lillerød; Rikke Olsen, Kastrup-Magleby BK
1996	Poul-Erik Høyer Larsen, Lillerød	Camilla Martin, Højbjerg BK	Jon Holst-Christensen, Lillerød; Thomas Lund, Kastrup-Magleby BK	Lisbet Stuer-Lauridsen, Gentofte BK; Marlene Thomsen, Skovshoved IF	Thomas Stavngaard; Ann Jørgensen, Lillerød
1997	Peter Rasmussen, Hillerød	Camilla Martin, Gentofte BK	Jon Holst-Christensen, Lillerød; Michael Søgaard, Kastrup-Magleby BK	Lisbet Stuer-Lauridsen, Gentofte BK; Marlene Thomsen, Skovshoved IF	Thomas Stavngaard; Ann Jørgensen, Lillerød
1998	Poul-Erik Høyer Larsen, Lillerød	Camilla Martin, Gentofte BK	Jon Holst-Christensen, Lillerød; Michael Søgaard, Kastrup-Magleby BK	Rikke Olsen, Kastrup-Magleby BK; Marlene Thomsen, Skovshoved IF	Michael Søgaard; Rikke Olsen, Kastrup-Magleby BK
1999	Peter Rasmussen, Hillerød	Camilla Martin, Gentofte BK	Jens Eriksen; Jesper Larsen, Hvidovre BC	Mette Schjoldager, Hvidovre BC; Ann-Lou Jørgensen, Kastrup-Magleby BK	Michael Søgaard; Rikke Olsen, Kastrup-Magleby BK
2000	Peter Gade, Gentofte BK	Camilla Martin, Gentofte BK	Jim Laugesen, Gentofte BK; Michael Søgaard, Kastrup-Magleby BK	Helene Kirkegaard, Lillerød; Rikke Olsen, Kastrup-Magleby BK	Michael Søgaard; Rikke Olsen, Kastrup-Magleby BK
2001	Peter Gade, Gentofte BK	Camilla Martin, Gentofte BK	Jens Eriksen; Jesper Larsen, Hvidovre BC	Helene Kirkegaard, Lillerød; Rikke Olsen, Kastrup-Magleby BK	Michael Søgaard; Rikke Olsen, Kastrup-Magleby BK
2002	Peter Gade, Gentofte BK	Camilla Martin, Gentofte BK	Jens Eriksen, Hvidovre BC; Martin Lundgaard, Værløse	Jane F. Bramsen; Ann-Lou Jørgensen, Kastrup-Magleby BK	Michael Søgaard; Rikke Olsen, Kastrup-Magleby BK
2003	Peter Gade, Gentofte BK	Camilla Martin, Værløse	Jim Laugesen, Gentofte BK; Michael Søgaard, Kastrup-Magleby BK	Rikke Olsen; Ann-Lou Jørgensen, Kastrup-Magleby BK	Jens Eriksen; Mette Schjoldager, Hvidovre BC
2004	Kenneth Jonassen, Greve Strands BK	Tine Rasmussen, Kastrup-Magleby BK	Lars Paaske, Københavns BK; Jonas Rasmussen, Kastrup-Magleby BK	Rikke Olsen; Ann-Lou Jørgensen, Kastrup-Magleby BK	Jens Eriksen; Mette Schjoldager, Hvidovre BC
2005	Peter Gade, Gentofte BK	Tine Rasmussen, Kastrup-Magleby BK	Jens Eriksen, Hvidovre BC; Martin Lundgaard, Værløse	Rikke Olsen, Kastrup-Magleby BK; Mette Schjoldager, Hvidovre BC	Thomas Laybourn; Kamilla Rytter Juhl, Værløse
2006	Peter Gade, Højbjerg BK	Tine Rasmussen, Kastrup-Magleby BK	Jens Eriksen, Hvidovre BC; Martin Lundgaard, Værløse	Britta Andersen; Mette Schjoldager, Hvidovre BC	Britta Andersen; Mette Schjoldager, Hvidovre BC
2007	Peter Gade, Højbjerg BK	Tine Rasmussen, Kastrup-Magleby BK	Lars Paaske, Greve Strands BK; Jonas Rasmussen, Kastrup-Magleby BK	Christinna Pedersen, Frederikshavn; Mie Schjøtt-Kristensen, Hillerød	Jens Eriksen, Hvidovre BC; Helle Nielsen, Kastrup-Magleby BK
2008	Kenneth Jonassen, Greve Strands BK	Tine Rasmussen, Værløse	Carsten Mogensen, Kastrup-Magleby BK; Mathias Boe, Skælskør	Mette van Dalm, Frederikshavn; Helene Kirkegaard, Skælskør	Joachim Fischer; Ann-Lou Jørgensen, Kastrup-Magleby BK
2009	Peter Gade, Højbjerg BK	Tine Rasmussen, Værløse	Carsten Mogensen, Kastrup-Magleby BK; Mathias Boe, Skælskør	Kamilla Rytter Juhl; Lena Frier Kristiansen, Værløse	Thomas Laybourn; Kamilla Rytter Juhl, Værløse
2010	Peter Høeg Gade, Skælskør	Tine Rasmussen, Værløse	Carsten Mogensen, Greve Strands BK; Mathias Boe, Skælskør	Marie Røpke; Helle Nielsen, Gentofte BK, Kastrup-Magleby BK	Mikkel Delbo Larsen; Mette Schjoldager, Gentofte BK, Skovshoved IF
2011	Peter Høeg Gade, Skælskør	Tine Baun, Værløse	Mads Conrad-Petersen, Aarhus AB; Jonas Rasmussen, Frederikshavn	Marie Røpke, Gentofte BK; Line Kruse, Viby J.	Mads Pieler Kolding, Skovshoved IF; Maria Helsbøl, Værløse
2012	Jan Ø. Jørgensen, Skovshoved IF	Tine Baun, Værløse	Mads Conrad-Petersen, Aarhus AB; Jonas Rasmussen, Frederikshavn	Marie Røpke, Gentofte BK; Line Kruse, Viby J.	Anders Skaarup Rasmussen, Højbjerg BK; Sara Thygesen, Odense BK
2013	Jan Ø. Jørgensen, Skovshoved IF	Tine Baun, Værløse	Rasmus Bonde, Aarhus AB; Mads Conrad-Petersen, Skovshoved IF	Kamilla Rytter Juhl; Christinna Pedersen, Greve Strands BK	Rasmus Bonde, Aarhus AB; Christinna Pedersen, Greve Strands BK
2014	Viktor Axelsen, Odense BK	Mia Blichfeldt, Solrød Strand	Mads Conrad-Petersen; Mads Pieler Kolding, Skovshoved IF	Line Kruse; Marie Røpke, Gentofte BK	Mads Conrad-Petersen; Julie Houmann, Skovshoved IF
2015	Jan Ø. Jørgensen, Skovshoved IF	Line Kjærsfeldt, Værløse	Mathias Boe, Odense BK; Carsten Mogensen, Skovshoved IF	Kamilla Rytter Juhl; Christinna Pedersen, Greve Strands BK	Mads Pieler Kolding, Skælskør; Kamilla Rytter Juhl, Greve Strands BK
2016	Rasmus Fladberg, Solrød Strand	Line Kjærsfeldt, Værløse	Mathias Boe, Odense BK; Carsten Mogensen, Skovshoved IF	Christinna Pedersen; Kamilla Rytter Juhl, Skovshoved IF	Joachim Fischer Nielsen, Skovshoved IF; Christinna Pedersen
2017	Anders Antonsen, Aarhus AB	Mette Poulsen, Skælskør	Rasmus Fladberg, Solrød Strand; Frederik Colberg, Gentofte BK	Sara Thygesen; Maiken Fruergaard, Odense BK	Mathias Christiansen, Greve Strands BK; Sara Thygesen, Odense BK
2018	Anders Antonsen, Aarhus AB	Mette Poulsen, Skovshoved IF	Anders Skaarup Rasmussen, Højbjerg; Kim Astrup, Skælskør	Sara Thygesen, Skovshoved IF; Maiken Fruergaard, Solrød Strand	Niclas Nøhr, Solrød Strand; Sara Thygesen, Skovshoved IF
2019	Anders Antonsen, Aarhus AB	Line Kjærsfeldt, Skælskør	Mathias Bay-Smidt, Højbjerg; Lasse Mølhede, Solrød Strand	Julie Finne-Ipsen, Værløse; Claudia Paredes, Skovshoved	Mathias Bay-Smidt, Højbjerg; Rikke S. Hansen, Greve
2020	Viktor Axelsen, Skovshoved IF	Line Christophersen, Gentofte BK	Kim Astrup, Skælskør; Anders Skaarup Rasmussen, Højbjerg	Sara Thygesen, Odense BK; Maiken Fruergaard, Solrød Strand	Niclas Nøhr, Greve; Sara Thygesen, Odense BK
2021	Victor Svendsen, Vendsyssel	Line Christophersen, Gentofte BK	Kim Astrup, Skælskør; Anders Skaarup Rasmussen, ViaBiler	Sara Thygesen; Maiken Fruergaard, Odense BK	Niclas Nøhr, Greve; Amalie Magelund, Skælskør
2022	Anders Antonsen, Aarhus AB	Line Christophersen, Gentofte BK	Kim Astrup, ViaBiler; Anders Skaarup Rasmussen, Højbjerg BK	Amalie Magelund, Team Skælskør-Slagelse; Freja Ravn, Team Skælskør-Slagelse	Mathias Thyrri, Værløse; Amalie Magelund, Team Skælskør-Slagelse
2023	Hans-Kristian Vittinghus	Line Christophersen	Rasmus Kjær; Frederik Søgaard	Maiken Fruergaard; Sara Thygesen	Mathias Christiansen; Sara Thygesen
2024	Rasmus Gemke	Line Christophersen	Andreas Søndergaard; Jesper Toft	Maiken Fruergaard; Sara Thygesen	Jesper Toft; Clara Graversen
2025	Rasmus Gemke, Skovshoved IF	Line Christophersen, Skovshoved IF	Rasmus Kjær, Gentofte BK; Frederik Søgaard, Solrød Strand	Natasja Anthonisen, Team Skælskør-Slagelse; Maiken Fruergaard, Odense BK	Jesper Toft, Højbjerg BK; Amalie Magelund, Højbjerg BK
