= 2008 Europe Cup (badminton) =

The 2008 Europe Cup in badminton was the 31st edition of the Europe Cup. It was held between June 11 and June 15, 2008, in the Borisoglebsky Sports Centre, in Ramenskoye, Russia.

== Results ==
Quarter-finals
(Russia) Prymorye
Bye
(Ukraine) SHVSM Kharkov | 4
(Portugal) U. D. de Santana | 0
(Finland) Ostersundom IF | 1
(Russia) Favorit-Ramenskoe | 4
Bye
(Spain) Soderin Rinconada

Semi-finals
(Russia) Prymorye | 4
(Ukraine) SHVSM Kharkov | 0
(Russia) Favorit-Ramenskoe | 4
(Spain) Soderin Rinconada | 3

Final
(Russia) Prymorye | 4
(Russia) Favorit-Ramenskoe | 1
Third place
(Ukraine) SHVSM Kharkov | 2
(Spain) Soderin Rinconada | 4
