= 2007 Europe Cup (badminton) =

The 2007 Europe Cup in badminton was the 30th edition of the Europe Cup. It was held between June 27 and July 1, 2007, in the Juliana van Stolberghal, in Amersfoort, Netherlands. It was organized by Badminton Combination Amersfoort in cooperation with Badminton Europe and the Dutch Badminton Association.

== Results ==
Quarter-finals
(Netherlands) BC Amersfoort
Bye
(Spain) CB Rinconada Sevilla | 4
(France) Issy Les Moulineaux BC | 1
(Ukraine) SHVSM - Kharkov | 3
(Russia) New League | 4
Bye
(Denmark) Kastrup-Magleby BK

Semi-finals
(Netherlands) BC Amersfoort | 4
(Spain) CB Rinconada Sevilla | 2
(Russia) New League | 4
(Denmark) Kastrup-Magleby BK | 1

Final
(Netherlands) BC Amersfoort | 2
(Russia) New League | 4
Third place
(Spain) CB Rinconada Sevilla | 3
(Denmark) Kastrup-Magleby BK | 4

== Final ==
| Category | New League Primorye | BC Amersfoort | 4–2 |
|---|---|---|---|
| Mixed doubles | (Russia) Evgenij Dremin & Valeria Sorokina | (Netherlands) Eric Pang & Lotte Bruil-Jonathans | 21–12, 22–20 |
| Women's singles (1) | (Russia) Evgenia Dimova | (Netherlands) Yao Jie | 7–21, 11–21 |
| Women's singles (2) | (Russia) Nina Vislova | (Ukraine) Larisa Griga | 21–17, 21–12 |
| Men's singles (1) | (Russia) Stanislav Pukhov | (Netherlands) Dicky Palyama | 21–13, 21–18 |
| Men's singles (2) | (Russia) Sergey Lunev | (Netherlands) Eric Pang | 14–21, 14–21 |
| Women's doubles | (Russia) Nina Vislova & Valeria Sorokina | (Netherlands) Yao Jie & Lotte Bruil-Jonathans | 21–16, 21–10 |
| Men's doubles | (Russia) Alexey Vasiliev & Evgenij Dremin | (Netherlands) Dicky Palyama & Joéli Residay | cancelled |
