= Gentofte BK =

Danish badminton club

GBK
- Full name: Gentofte Badminton Klub
- Nicknames: GBK
- Sport: Badminton
- Founded: 10 February 1931
- League: Danish Badminton League
- Based in: Gentofte, Denmark

Gentofte Badminton Klub (Gentofte Badminton Klub), also known as GBK, is a badminton club in Gentofte, Gentofte Municipality, Copenhagen, Denmark. It is based in Gentofte Sportsby. The club has won more than 100 titles. It experienced its most successful period in the late 1970s and 1980 when it won Europe Cup seven times. Former players include some of Denmark's most successful badminton players, including, Morten Frost, Lene Køppen, Poul-Erik Høyer, Peter Gade and Camilla Martin.

== History ==
Gentofte Badminton Klub (Gentofte Badminton or GBK) was founded on 10 February 1931. The club initially played in rented premises on Maltegårdsvej in Charlottenlund until inaugurating its current badminton hall in 1936.

== Location ==
The club is based in GBK Hallen in Gentofte Sportsby. The venue contains 10 badminton courts.

== Former players ==
- Poul Holm
- Aase Schiøtt Jacobsen
- Ole Jensen
- Tonny Ahm
- Per Walsøe
- Anne Flint
- Marko Daraboš
- Ib Frederiksen
- Bente Flint
- Steen Skovgaard
- Kirsten Larsen
- Flemming Delfs
- Lene Køppen
- Poul-Erik Høyer
- Pernille Dupont
- Morten Frost
- Grete Mogensen
- Peter Gade
- Camilla Martin

== Achievements ==
=== Europe Cup ===
- Champions: 1978, 1979, 1981, 1982, 1983, 1985, 1986
- Runner-Up: 1984

=== Danish Badminton League ===
- Champion:1949/1950, 1950/1951, 1951/1952, 1974/1975, 1975/1976, 1976/1977, 1977/1978, 1978/1979, 1982/1983, 1983/1984, 1985/1986, 1988/1989, 1989/1990, 1990/1991,1991/1992,1996/1997

=== Danish National Badminton Championships ===
Season	Player(s)	Discipline	Place
1934/1935	Poul Vagn Nielsen, Gentofte BK	Men's singles	1
1935/1936	Poul Vagn Nielsen, Gentofte BK	Men's singles	1
1935/1936	Poul Vagn Nielsen / Tonny Olsen, Gentofte BK	Mixed	1
1935/1936	Eric Kirchoff / Poul V. Nielsen, Gentofte BK	Men's doubles	1
1935/1936	Bodil Strømann, Skovshoved IF / Tonny Olsen, Gentofte BK	Women's doubles	1
1936/1937	Eric Kirchoff, Gentofte BK	Men's singles	1
1937/1938	Bodil Rise / Tonny Olsen, Gentofte BK	Women's doubles	1
1937/1938	Tonny Olsen, Gentofte BK	Women's singles	1
1938/1939	Tonny Olsen, GentofteBK	Women's singles	1
1938/1939	Bodil Rise / Tonny Olsen, Gentofte BK	Women's doubles	1
1939/1940	Tonny Olsen, Gentofte BK	Women's singles	1
1939/1940	Bodil Duus / Tonny Olsen, Gentofte BK	Women's doubles	1
1941/1942	Tonny Olsen, Gentofte BK	Women's singles	1
1942/1943	Agnete Friis, Odense BK / Tonny Olsen, Gentofte BK	Women's doubles	1
1942/1943	Tonny Olsen, Gentofte BK	Women's singles	1
1944/1945	Tonny Olsen, Gentofte BK	Women's singles	1
1945/1946	Tonny Olsen, Gentofte BK	Women's singles	1
1945/1946	Agnete Friis / Tonny Olsen, Gentofte BK	Women's doubles	1
1946/1947	Agnete Friis / Tonny Ahm, Gentofte BK	Women's doubles	1
1946/1947	Poul Holm / Aase Schiøtt Jacobsen, Gentofte BK	Mixed	1
1947/1948	Tonny Ahm, Gentofte BK	Women's singles	1
1947/1948	Agnete Friis / Tonny Ahm, Gentofte BK	Women's doubles	1
1947/1948	Jørn Skaarup, Københavns BK / Tonny Ahm, Gentofte BK	Mixed	1
1948/1949	Poul Holm, Gentofte BK	Men's singles	1
1948/1949	Tonny Ahm, Gentofte BK	Women's singles	1
1949/1950	Gentofte Badminton Klub	Team	1
1949/1950	Poul Holm / Tonny Ahm, Gentofte BK	Mixed	1
1949/1950	Tonny Ahm, Gentofte BK	Women's singles	1
1949/1950	Agnete Friis / Birgit Rostgaard Frøhne, Gentofte BK	Women's doubles	1
1950/1951	Gentofte Badminton Klub	Team	1
1950/1951	Poul Holm, Gentofte BK	Men's singles	1
1950/1951	Aase Schiøtt Jacobsen / Tonny Ahm, Gentofte BK	Women's doubles	1
1951/1952	Tonny Ahm, Gentofte BK	Women's singles	1
1951/1952	Poul Holm / Tonny Ahm, Gentofte BK	Mixed	1
1951/1952	Poul Holm / Ole Jensen, Gentofte BK	Men's double	1
1951/1952	Annelise Petersen, Gentofte	Women's singles	1
1951/1952	Poul Holm, Gentofte BK	Men's singles	1
1951/1952	Gentofte Badminton Klub	Team	1
1952/1953	Poul Holm, Gentofte BK	Men's singles	1
1952/1953	Poul Holm / Ole Jensen, Gentofte BK	Men's singles	1
1952/1953	Agnete Friis / Birgit Schultz-Pedersen, Gentofte BK	Women's doubles	1
1953/1954	Agnete Friis / Gitte Schultz-Pedersen, Gentofte BK	Women's doubles	1
1953/1954	Poul Holm / Ole Jensen, Gentofte BK	Men's doubles	1
1956/1957	Tonny Ahm, Gentofte BK	Women's singles	1
1957/1958	Agnete Friis / Birte Kristiansen, Gentofte BK	Women's doubles	1
1963/1964	Pernille Mølgaard Hansen, GentofteBK	Women's singles	1
1966/1967	Per Walsøe / Pernille Mølgaard Hansen, Gentofte BK	Mixed	1
1967/1968	Anne Flindt / Bente Flindt Sørensen, Gentofte BK	Women's doubles	1
1968/1969	Per Walsøe / Pernille Mølgaard Hansen, Gentofte BK	Mixed	1
1969/1970	Per Walsøe / Pernille Mølgaard Hansen, Gentofte BK	Mixed	1
1969/1970	Svend Pri, Amager BC / Per Walsøe, Gentofte BK	Men's double	1
1970/1971	Svend Pri, Amager BC / Per Walsøe, Gentofte BK	Men's double	1
1971/1972	Poul Petersen, Østerbro BK / Per Walsøe, Gentofte BK	Men's double	1
1971/1972	Pernille Kaagaard / Anne Flindt, Gentofte BK	Women's doubles	1
1973/1974	Pernille Kaagaard, Gentofte BK / Ulla Strand, Københavns BK	Women's doubles	1
1974/1975	Lene Køppen, Gentofte BK / Inge Borgstrøm, Ringsted	Women's doubles	1
1974/1975	Lene Køppen, Gentofte BK	Women's single	1
1974/1975	Steen Skovgaard / Pernille Kaagaard, Gentofte BK	Mixed	1
1975/1976	Lene Køppen, Gentofte BK / Inge Borgstrøm, Ringsted	Women's doubles	1
1975/1976	Steen Skovgaard / Pernille Kaagaard, Gentofte BK	Mixed	1
1975/1976	Lene Køppen, Gentofte BK	Women's single	1
1976/1977	Lene Køppen, Gentofte BK	Women's single	1
1976/1977	Steen Skovgaard / Lene Køppen, Gentofte BK	Mixed	1
1976/1977	Steen Skovgaard, Gentofte BK / Svend Pri, Søllerød-Nærum IK	Men's double	1
1976/1977	Lene Køppen, Gentofte BK / Lonny Bostofte, Nykøbing F	Women's doubles	1
1977/1978	Morten Frost, Gentofte BK	Men's singles	1
1977/1978	Steen Skovgaard, Gentofte BK / Flemming Delfs, Værløse	Men's double	1
1977/1978	Lene Køppen, Gentofte BK	Women's single	1
1977/1978	Steen Skovgaard / Lene Køppen, Gentofte BK	Mixed	1
1978/1979	Steen Skovgaard / Lene Køppen, Gentofte BK	Mixed	1
1978/1979	Morten Frost, Gentofte BK	Men's singles	1
1978/1979	Lene Køppen, Gentofte BK	Women's single	1
1978/1979	Lene Køppen / Susanne Berg, Gentofte BK	Women's doubles	1
1979/1980	Morten Frost, Gentofte BK	Men's singles	1
1979/1980	Steen Fladberg / Lene Køppen, Gentofte BK	Mixed	1
1979/1980	Steen Fladberg, Køge / Morten Frost, Gentofte BK	Men's double	1
1979/1980	Lene Køppen, Gentofte BK	Women's single	1
1979/1980	Lene Køppen / Anne Skovgaard, Gentofte BK	Women's doubles	1
1980/1981	Steen Skovgaard / Anne Skovgaard, Gentofte BK	Mixed	1
1980/1981	Steen Skovgaard, Gentofte BK / Flemming Delfs, Greve Strand	Men's double	1
1980/1981	Lene Køppen / Anne Skovgaard, Gentofte BK	Women's doubles	1
1980/1981	Lene Køppen, Gentofte BK	Women's single	1
1981/1982	Kirsten Larsen, Gentofte BK	Women's single	1
1981/1982	Lene Køppen / Anne Skovgaard, Gentofte BK	Women's doubles	1
1981/1982	Lene Køppen, Gentofte BK	Women's single	1
1981/1982	Steen Fladberg, Køge / Morten Frost, Gentofte BK	Men's double	1
1981/1982	Morten Frost, Gentofte BK	Men's singles	1
1981/1982	Steen Skovgaard / Anne Skovgaard, Gentofte BK	Mixed	1
1982/1983	Morten Frost, Gentofte BK	Men's singles	1
1982/1983	Lene Køppen, Gentofte BK	Women's single	1
1982/1983	Steen Skovgaard / Jens Peter Nierhoff Gentofte BK	Men's double	1
1982/1983	Kirsten Larsen, Gentofte BK	Women's single	1
1982/1983	Steen Skovgaard / Anne Skovgaard, Gentofte BK	Mixed	1
1982/1983	Jens Peter Nierhoff, Gentofte BK / Jesper Helledie, Hvidovre BC	Men's double	1
1982/1983	Steen Skovgaard / Anne Skovgaard, Gentofte BK	Mixed	1
1983/1984	Kirsten Larsen, Gentofte BK	Women's single	1
1983/1984	Hanne Adsbøl, Lyngby / Kirsten Larsen, Gentofte BK	Women's doubles	1
1983/1984	Michael Kjeldsen, Gentofte BK / Mark Christiansen, Triton, Aalborg	Men's double	1
1983/1984	Morten Frost / Ulla-Britt Frost, Gentofte BK	Mixed	1
1983/1984	Jens Peter Nierhoff / Morten Frost, Gentofte BK	Men's double	1
1983/1984	Morten Frost, Gentofte BK	Men's singles	1
1984/1985	Charlotte Hattens, Gentofte BK	Women's single	1
1984/1985	Lisbet Stuer-Lauridsen, Gentofte BK	Women's single	1
1984/1985	Michael Kjeldsen, Gentofte BK / Mark Christiansen, Triton, Aalborg	Men's double	1
1985/1986	Kirsten Larsen, Gentofte BK	Women's doubles	1
1985/1986	Peter Buch, Lillerød / Hanne Adsbøl, Gentofte BK	Mixed	1
1985/1986	Charlotte Hattens, Gentofte BK	Women's single	1
1985/1986	Michael Kjeldsen, Gentofte BK / Mark Christiansen, Triton, Aalborg	Men's double	1
1985/1986	Ib Frederiksen, Gentofte BK	Men's singles	1
1985/1986	Poul -Erik Høyer Larsen, Gentofte BK	Men's single	1
1986/1987	Morten Frost, Gentofte BK	Men's singles	1
1986/1987	Kirsten Larsen, Gentofte BK	Women's singæe	1
1986/1987	Pernille Nedergaard, Gentofte BK	Women's single	1
1986/1987	Claus Thomsen, Gentofte BK	Men's singles	1
1988/1989	Poul-Erik Høyer Larsen, Gentofte BK	Men's singles	1
1989/1990	Thomas Lund, Kastrup-Magleby / Pernille Dupont, Gentofte BK	Mixed	1
1989/1990	Charlotte Hattens, Gentofte BK	Women's single	1
1990/1991	Janek Roos, Ringsted / Jim Laugesen, Gentofte	Men's double	1
1990/1991	Jim Laugesen, Gentofte	Men's singles	1
1991/1992	Peter Rasmussen, Gentofte	Men's singles	1
1991/1992	Jim Laugesen, Gentofte / Janek Roos, Ringsted	Men's double	1
1991/1992	Thomas Stuer-Lauridsen, Gentofte BK	Men's singles	1
1991/1992	Pernille Dupont, Gentofte BK / Grete Mogensen, Herning	Women's single	1
1991/1992	Thomas Lund, Kastrup-Magleby / Pernille Dupont, Gentofte BK	Mixed	1
1992/1993	Thomas Stuer-Lauridsen, Gentofte BK	Men's singles	1
1993/1994	Thomas Stuer-Lauridsen, Gentofte BK	Herreneinzel	1
1994/1995	Henrik Stumpe, Gentofte	Men's singles	1
1995/1996	Lisbet Stuer-Lauridsen, Gentofte / Marlene Thomsen, Skovshoved IF	Women's doubles	1
1996/1997	Camilla Martin, Gentofte	Women's single	1
1996/1997	Lisbet Stuer-Lauridsen, Gentofte / Marlene Thomsen, Skovshoved IF	Women's doubles	1
1997/1998	Camilla Martin, Gentofte	Women's single	1
1998/1999	Camilla Martin, Gentofte	Women's single	1
1999/2000	Peter Gade, Gentofte	Men's singles	1
1999/2000	Jim Laugesen, Gentofte / Michael Søgaard, Kastrup Magleby	Men's double	1
1999/2000	Camilla Martin, Gentofte	Women's single	1
2000/2001	Camilla Martin, Gentofte	Women's single	1
2000/2001	Peter Gade, Gentofte	Men's single	1
2001/2002	Michala Wolff Petersen, SB50 Ishøj / Maria Røpke, Gentofte	Women's doubles	1
2001/2002	Maria Røpke, Gentofte	Women's single	1
2001/2002	Camilla Martin, Gentofte	Women's single	1
2001/2002	Peter Gade, Gentofte	Men's singles	1
2001/2002	Stefan K. Andersen, Skovshoved / Maria Røpke, Gentofte	Mixed	1
2002/2003	Peter Gade, Gentofte	Men's single	1
2002/2003	Jim Laugesen, Gentofte / Michael Søgaard, KMB	Men's double	1
2003/2004	Marie Røpke, Gentofte / Mia Sejr Nielsen, Erritsø	Women's doubles	1
2003/2004	Nina Mortensen / Hanne Pærregaard, Gentofte	Women's doubles	1
2004/2005	Peter Gade, Gentofte	Men's single	1
2009/2010	Marie Røpke / Helle Nielsen, Gentofte, Kastrup KMB	Women's doubles	1
2009/2010	Mikkel Delbo Larsen / Mette Schjoldager, Gentofte, Skovshoved	Mixed	1
