= Greve Strands BK =

Danish badminton club

- Full name: Greve Strands BK
- Sport: badminton
- Founded: 11 October 1937
- Based in: Greve Strand, Denmark
- Website: http://www.hbc-badminton.dk/

Greve Strands Badmintonklub (Greve Strands BK or GSB) is a badminton club in Greve Strand outside Copenhagen, Denmark. It has won the Danish Badminton League four times and Europe Cup once.

== History ==
The club was founded on 11 October 1937.

== Notable players ==
- Dorte Kjær
- Flemming Delfs
- Carsten Mogensen
- Lars Paaske

== Achievements ==
=== Europe Cup ===
- Champion: 2004

=== Danish Badminton League ===
Champion: 2007–08, 2009–10, 2010–2011, 2014-15
