= Lillerød BK =

Danish badminton club

Lillerød BK (Lillerød Badmintonklub) is a badminton club based in Lillerød in the northern part of the Greater Copenhagen area. The club was founded on 7 November 1940. It has won the Danish Badminton League four times and Europe League three times.

== Achievements ==
=== Europe Cup ===
Champion: 1993, 1994, 1995

=== Danish Badminton League ===
Champion: 1992–93, 1993–94, 1994–95, 1995-96
