= Københavns Badminton Klub =

Danish badminton club

KBK
- Full name: Københavns Badminton Klub
- Sport: badminton
- Founded: 1928
- Based in: Copenhagen, Denmark
- Website: http://kbknet.dk/

Københavns Badminton Klub (KBK) is a badminton club in Copenhagen, Denmark. It is one of the oldest and largest badminton clubs in the country and has won the Danish Badminton League 18 times.

== History ==
Københavns Badminton Klub was founded in 1928. The club dominated the Danish team tournament which was introduced in 1950 until the mid-1970s. The club was for many years based at Randersgade 21 (Rothesgade 12) but moved to new premises in Krausesvej after a fire in December 1991.

== Today ==
The club has around 700 members. Its badminton hall is located at Krausesvej 12 in Østerbro.

== Achievements ==
=== Danish Badminton League ===
Champion: 1952–53, 1953–54, 1954–1955, 1955–56, 1957–58, 1958–1959, 1959–60, 1960–61, 1961–1962, 1962–63, 1963–64, 1965–66, 1967–68, 1969–70,1970–71, 1971–72, 1972–73, 1973-74

== Notable players ==
- Erland Kops
