= Larisa Griga =

Ukrainian badminton player (born 1984)

Larisa Griga Larysa Hryha
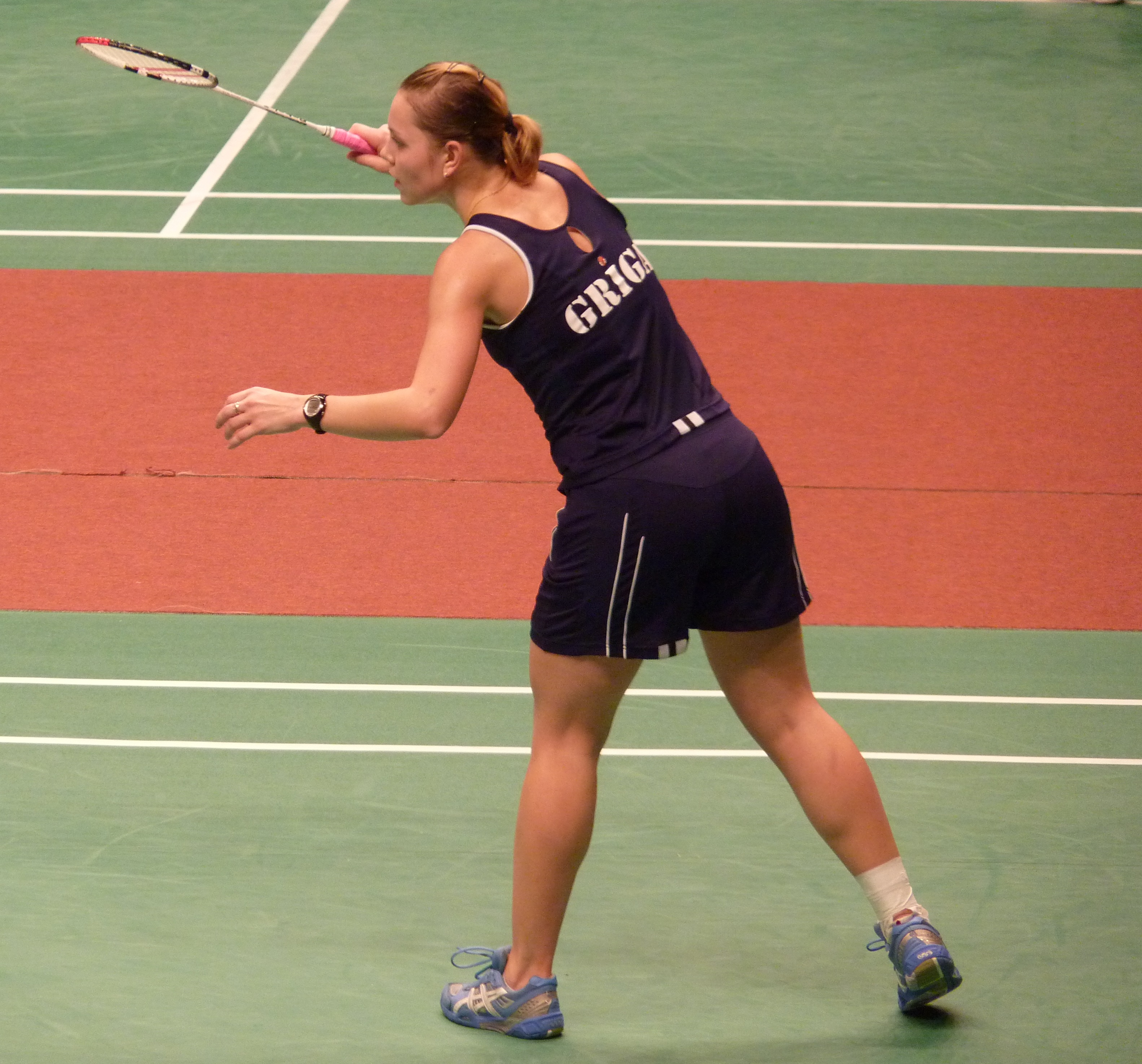

Personal information
- Born: Larisa Valeriïvna Griga; 31 May 1984 (age 42) Dnipropetrovsk, Ukrainian SSR, Soviet Union
- Height: 1.70 m (5 ft 7 in)
- Weight: 65 kg (143 lb)

Sport
- Country: Ukraine
- Sport: Badminton
- Handedness: Right
- Coached by: Semenuta V PG Jonsson; Makhnovskiy Gennadiy

Women's singles & doubles
- Highest ranking: 29 (WS 11 August 2011); 330 (WD 14 March 2013)
- BWF profile
Medal record
Women's badminton
Representing Ukraine
European Junior Championships
Gold medal – first place	2003 Esbjerg	Girls' singles

Larisa Valeriïvna Griga (Ukrainian: Лариса Валеріївна Грига, Larysa Valeriivna Hryha; born 31 May 1984) is a badminton player from Ukraine. She was the gold medalist at the 2003 European Junior Championships in the girls' singles event. She competed at the 2008 and 2012 Olympic Games.

== Career ==
She played at the 2005 IBF World Championships in Anaheim and reached the second round (lost to 2nd seed Xie Xingfang of China).

As a part of the BC Amersfoort team, Griga reached the final of the European Cup 2007 held in Amersfoort. Together with Lotte Bruil-Jonathans, Yao Jie, Dicky Palyama and Eric Pang the final was lost against the team of NL Primorje. In the semi-finals they were too strong for CB Rinconada. Since the autumn of 2008, Griga is playing for the club Fyrisfjädern in Uppsala, Sweden.

== Achievements ==
=== European Junior Championships ===
Girls' singles
Year	Venue	Opponent	Score	Result
2003	Esbjerg Badminton Center; Esbjerg, Denmark	(Denmark) Nanna Brosolat Jensen	11–9, 11–9	Gold

=== BWF Grand Prix ===
The BWF Grand Prix had two levels, the Grand Prix and Grand Prix Gold. It was a series of badminton tournaments sanctioned by the Badminton World Federation (BWF) and played between 2007 and 2017.

Women's singles
Year	Tournament	Opponent	Score	Result
2008	Russian Open	(Russia) Ella Diehl	10–21, 21–17, 12–21	(silver) Runner-up

BWF Grand Prix Gold tournament
BWF Grand Prix tournament

=== BWF International Challenge/Series ===
Women's singles
Year	Tournament	Opponent	Score	Result
2007	Dutch International	(Estonia) Kati Tolmoff	21–12, 15–21, 20–22	(silver) Runner-up
2007	Victorian International	(Iceland) Ragna Ingólfsdóttir	21–11, 21–10	(gold) Winner
2007	North Shore City International	(Vietnam) Lê Ngọc Nguyên Nhung	21–19, 21–14	(gold) Winner
2007	Belgian International	(England) Elizabeth Cann	21–15, 16–21, 21–18	(gold) Winner
2007	Norwegian International	(Germany) Juliane Schenk	12–21, 17–21	(silver) Runner-up
2008	Dutch International	(Japan) Yu Wakita	21–19, 21–19	(gold) Winner
2008	Norwegian International	(China) Zhang Xi	18–21, 15–21	(silver) Runner-up
2008	Italian International	(Germany) Juliane Schenk	21–15, 13–21, 17–21	(silver) Runner-up
2010	Kharkiv International	(Ukraine) Marija Ulitina	21–14, 17–21, 21–13	(gold) Winner
2010	Norwegian International	(Germany) Olga Konon	17–21, 7–21	(silver) Runner-up
2011	Polish Open	(Japan) Yuka Kusunose	21–15, 21–16	(gold) Winner
2011	Belgian International	(Germany) Olga Konon	12–21, 13–21	(silver) Runner-up

Women's doubles
Year	Tournament	Partner	Opponent	Score	Result
2003	Le Volant d'Or de Toulouse	(Ukraine) Elena Nozdran	(Poland) Kamila Augustyn (Poland) Nadieżda Kostiuczyk	10–15, 2–15	(silver) Runner-up

BWF International Challenge tournament
BWF International Series tournament
