= Hvidovre Badminton Club =

Danish badminton club

HBC
- Full name: Hvidovre Badminton Club
- Sport: badminton
- Founded: 22 April 1948
- Based in: Hvidovre, Denmark
- Website: http://www.hbc-badminton.dk/

Hvidovre Badminton Club (HBC), also known as Hvidovre BK (Hvidovre Badmintonklub), is a badminton club in Hvidovre in the western suburbs of Copenhagen, Denmark. It has won the Danish Badminton League three times and Europe Cup twice.

== History ==
The Hvidovre Badmintonklub was founded as Holmegårdens Badminton Club on 22 April 1948. It was then part of Holmegårdens Gymnastikforening and used the gymnastics hall at Holmegårdskolen in the northern part of Hvidovre. The number of members grew steadily and the club changed its name to Hvidovre Badmintonklub (Hvidovre BK) on 4 March 1960. The club won the Danish Badminton League for the first time in 1980.

== Notable players ==
- Jesper Helledie
- Morten Bokelund Two times champion in men's double at Hvidovre - SEN A 2018-2019

== Location ==
The club is based in HBC Hallen on Bibliotekvej 62 in Hvidovre.

== Achievements ==
=== Europe Cup ===
- Champion: 1997, 2001
- Runner-Up: 1980

=== Danish Badminton League ===
Champion: 1979–80, 2000–01, 2005-2006
