= Amager Badminton Club =

Danish badminton club

Amager BC
- Full name: Amager Badminton Club
- Sport: badminton
- Founded: 15 March 1935
- Based in: Amager, Copenhagen, Denmark
- Website: http://amagerbadmintonclub.dk/

Amager Badminton Club (Amager BC or ABC) was a badminton club in Amager in Copenhagen, Denmark. It won the Danish Badminton League in 1957. The club had to close down in 2018 due to financial difficulties. Most players moved to the nearby club Amager BC37.

== History ==
The club was founded on 15 March 1935.

== Notable players ==
- Kirsten Thorndahl
- Tage Madsen
- Svend Pri
- Henning Borch

== Achievements ==
=== Danish Badminton League ===
Champion: 1956-57
