= Europe Cup (badminton) =

International badminton club championships

The Europe Cup (also known as European Badminton Club Championships) is a badminton team championships played by clubs from all around Europe, comparable to the UEFA Champions League in football. It was established in 1978 by the members of Badminton Europe.

== Championships ==
Year	Number	Host City	Host Country	Events
1978	1	Bochum	West Germany	1
1979	2	Haarlem	Netherlands	1
1980	3	Mülheim	Germany	1
1981	4	Copenhagen	Denmark	1
1982	5	Antwerp	Belgium	1
1983	6	Paris	France	1
1984	7	Malmö	Sweden	1
1985	8	Mülheim	West Germany	1
1986	9	Haarlem	Netherlands	1
1987	10	Villach	Austria	1
1988	11	Moscow	Soviet Union	1
1989	12	San Javier	Spain	1
1990	13	Budapest	Hungary	1
1991	14	Antwerp	Belgium	1
1992	15	Sofia	Bulgaria	1
1993	16	Kristiansand	Norway	1
1994	17	Most	Czech Republic	1
1995	18	Kristiansand	Norway	1
1996	19	Haarlem	Netherlands	1
1997	20	Lisburn	United Kingdom	1
1998	21	Most	Czech Republic	1
1999	22	Dornbirn	Austria	1
2000	23	Eindhoven	Netherlands	1
2001	24	Uppsala	Sweden	1
2002	25	Berlin	Germany	1
2003	26	Uppsala	Sweden	1
2004	27	Haarlem	Netherlands	1
2005	28	Issy-les-Moulineaux	France	1
2006	29	La Rinconada, Seville	Spain	1
2007	30	Amersfoort	Netherlands	1

Year	Number	Host City	Host Country	Events
2008	31	Moscow	Russia	1
2009	32	Sofia	Bulgaria	1
2010	33	Zwolle	Netherlands	1
2011	34	Zwolle	Netherlands	1
2012	35	Pécs	Hungary	1
2013	36	Beauvais	France	1
2014	37	Amiens	France	1
2015	38	Tours	France	1
2016	39	Tours	France	1
2017	40	Milan	Italy	1
2018	41	Lubin	Poland	1
2019	42	Junglinster	Luxembourg	1
2020	43	Białystok	Poland	1
2022	44	Białystok	Poland	1
2023	45	Oviedo	Spain	1

== Finalists ==
Year	Winner	Runner up	Score
1978	(Denmark) Gentofte BK	(West Germany) 1. BV Mülheim	5–2
1979	(Denmark) Gentofte BK	(Netherlands) BC Duinwijck	6–1
1980	(England) Wimbledon SBC	(Denmark) Hvidovre BK	4–3
1981	(Denmark) Gentofte BK	(Sweden) BMK Aura Malmö	7–0
1982	(Denmark) Gentofte BK	(Netherlands) BC Duinwijck	6–1
1983	(Denmark) Gentofte BK	(Sweden) BMK Aura Malmö	7–0
1984	(Sweden) BMK Aura Malmö	(Denmark) Gentofte BK	7–0
1985	(Denmark) Gentofte BK	(Sweden) BMK Aura Malmö	7–0
1986	(Denmark) Gentofte BK	(Sweden) BMK Aura Malmö	6–1
1987	(Denmark) Triton BK Aalborg	(Sweden) BMK Aura Malmö	4–3
1988	(Soviet Union) SAC Omsk	(Denmark) Triton BK Aalborg	4–3
1989	(England) Headingley BC	(Sweden) Göteborgs BK	4–3
1990	(Sweden) Göteborgs BK	(Netherlands) Velo BC van Zundert	5–2
1991	(Sweden) Stockholm Sparvagars GoIF	(England) Headingley BC	5–2
1992	(Austria) BC Feibra Linz	(Iceland) TBC Reykjavík	6–1
1993	(Denmark) Lillerød BK	(Sweden) Göteborgs BK	4–3
1994	(Denmark) Lillerød BK	(Sweden) Göteborgs BK	5–2
1995	(Denmark) Lillerød BK	(Sweden) Göteborgs BK	5–2
1996	(Denmark) Kastrup Magleby BK	(Russia) Technokhim Moscow	4–1
1997	(Denmark) Hvidovre BK	(Russia) Technokhim Moscow	4–3
1998	(Denmark) Kastrup Magleby BK	(Russia) Technokhim Moscow	4–1
1999	(Germany) BC Eintracht Südring	(Netherlands) Sportschool van Zijderveld	5–1
2000	(Denmark) Kastrup Magleby BK	(Sweden) Fyrisfjädern Uppsala	5–2

Year	Winner	Runner up	Score
2001	(Denmark) Hvidovre BK	(Sweden) Fyrisfjädern Uppsala	4–3
2002	(Russia) Lokomotiv Rekord Moscow	(Sweden) Fyrisfjädern Uppsala	4–3
2003	(Russia) Lokomotiv Rekord Moscow	(Sweden) Fyrisfjädern Uppsala	4–1
2004	(Denmark) Greve Strands BK	(Germany) FC Langenfeld	4–1
2005	(Denmark) Kastrup Magleby BK	(Germany) 1. BC Beuel	4–1
2006^{1}	(France) Issy Les Moulineaux BC 92	(Ukraine) SC Meteor Dnipropetrovsk (Portugal) Uniao Desportiva de Santana	
2007	(Russia) Primorye Vladivostok	(Netherlands) BC Amersfoort	4–2
2008	(Russia) Primorye Vladivostok	(Russia) Favorit-Ramenskoe	4–1
2009	(Russia) Favorit Ramenskoe	(France) Issy Les Moulineaux	4–2
2010	(Germany) 1. BC Saarbrücken	(Russia) Favorit-Ramenskoe	4–2
2011	(Netherlands) BC Duinwijck	(Netherlands) Van Zundert Velo	4–2
2012	(Russia) Primorye Vladivostok	(Denmark) Team Skælskør-Slagelse	4–2
2013	(Russia) Primorye Vladivostok	(Denmark) Team Skælskør-Slagelse	4–1
2014	(Russia) Primorye Vladivostok	(France) BC Chambly Oise	4–1
2015	(Russia) Primorye Vladivostok	(France) Aix Universite CB	3–1
2016	(France) Issy Les Moulineaux BC 92	(France) BC Chambly Oise	3–2
2017	(France) Issy Les Moulineaux BC 92	(France) BC Chambly Oise	3–1
2018	(Russia) Primorye Vladivostok	(France) BC Chambly Oise	3–1
2019	(Russia) Primorye Vladivostok	(France) BC Chambly Oise	3–0
2022	(Poland) UKS Hubal Bialystok	(France) BC Chambly Oise	3–1
2023	(Italy) Matex MaraBadminton	(Spain) Recreativo IES La Orden	3–1

^1 In 2006 the CB Rinconada team for the final included a player who was not qualified to play for them. The title was subsequently awarded to the runners-up, IMBC 92 (Issy Les Moulineaux BC 92). The losers of the two semifinals were promoted to joint second place. Thus for the first time in history, two teams emerged as silver medalists.

== Championships by clubs ==
Club	Winner	Runner up
(Russia) Primorye Vladivostok	8	0
(Denmark) Gentofte	7	1
(Denmark) Kastrup Magleby BK	4	0
(Denmark) Lillerød	3	0
(Denmark) Hvidovre	2	1
(France) Issy Les Moulineaux	2	1
(Russia) Lokomotiv Rekord Moscow	2	1
(Sweden) BMK Aura Malmö	1	5
(Sweden) Göteborgs BK	1	4
(Netherlands) BC Duinwijck	1	2
(Russia) Favorit-Ramenskoe	1	2
(Denmark) Triton BK Aalborg	1	1
(England) Headingley BC	1	1
(Germany) BC Eintracht Südring	1	0
(Austria) BC Feibra Linz	1	0
(Germany) 1. BC Saarbrücken	1	0
(Denmark) Greve Strands	1	0
(Italy) Matex MaraBadminton	1	0
(Sweden) Stockholm Sparvagars GoIF	1	0
(Soviet Union) SAC Omsk	1	0
(England) Wimbledon SBC	1	0
(Poland) UKS Hubal Bialystok	1	0
